= Millencolin discography =

- Studio albums: 9
- EPs: 4
- Soundtrack albums: 1
- Compilation albums: 2
- Singles: 20
- Video albums: 3
- Music videos: 17
- Demos: 2
- Split: 1

This is a comprehensive discography of Millencolin, a Swedish punk rock band. The band rose to popularity in 2000 with their album Pennybridge Pioneers. They have released nine studio albums, two compilation albums, four EPs, and numerous singles.

== Notes ==
- The first album was called "Tiny Tunes", but they had to change the cover and title due to legal trouble with Warner Bros in 1996. They decided to call it Same old tunes, since it contains the same old songs. The Walt Disney Company also initiated legal action against the band over the title of the song "Disney Time", which was subsequently re-titled "Diznee Time".
- Pennybridge Pioneers was the first gold album. Over 35000 copies sold in Australia.
- The "Yellow Bird" appears in all albums and compilations, except for Home from Home.
- Life on a Plate reached gold-status in Sweden April 2002 seven years after the release. Over 50 000 copies sold in Sweden.
- Many people think that Sense & Sensibility of the True Brew is a single but according to Erik in an interview to Music Feed from Australia: "it's not actually a single but it reached a good rotation here and the radio in Sweden as well it's actually a launch track of the album. It's a launch track of the album and epitaph our record label told us like can you guys do like a stationary YouTube clip for this or maybe like a lyric clip but since I'm doing a lot of video editing and stuff like let's do a complete no budget video for this using GoPro".
- Nowadays there are 6 songs that have not been released in any Millencolin's compilation or single. Check below:

Song	Appeared on	Year	Notes
"Disney Time"	Hardcore for the Masses Vol. II - A Viritual Hardcore Reality	1994	Due to lack of information it is not possible to confirm if it is an early version or a new version.
"Da Strike"	G. - Rock Around the Clock	1994	Due to lack of information it is not possible to confirm if it is an early version or a new version.
"Understand"	Salmons of Hort	1995	Originally performed by Superdong
"AB Böna Och" (feat. Mieszko Talarczyk)	Heartattack Compilation Vol. 1	2004	Originally performed by Asta Kask
"Man or Mouse" (live)	Music 4 Cancer: The Cause	2010	
"Every Night"	Ukraine Benefit Compilation	2022	Previously Unreleased

== Albums ==
=== Studio albums ===
Title	Details	Peak chart positions										Certifications
Title	Details	SWE	AUS	AUT	FRA	GER	NZ	NOR	UK	US Heat	US Indie	Certifications
Tiny Tunes	Released: 28 October 1994; Re-released: 22 September 1998 (as Same Old Tunes); Label: Burning Heart, Epitaph; Formats: CD, DL	22	—	—	—	—	—	—	—	—	—	
Life on a Plate	Released: 11 October 1995; Label: Burning Heart, Epitaph; Formats: CD, DL	4	—	—	—	—	—	—	—	—	—	IFPI: Gold
For Monkeys	Released: 20 April 1997; Label: Burning Heart, Epitaph; Formats: CD, DL	17	—	—	—	72	—	36	—	—	—	
Pennybridge Pioneers	Released: 22 February 2000; Label: Burning Heart, Epitaph; Formats: CD, DL	33	13	—	—	32	36	—	—	34	23	ARIA: Platinum
Home from Home	Released: 12 March 2002; Label: Burning Heart, Epitaph; Formats: CD, DL	6	3	25	91	29	29	36	90	22	9	IFPI: Silver
Kingwood	Released: 30 March 2005; Label: Burning Heart, Epitaph; Formats: CD, DL	2	12	41	135	46	—	33	—	22	21	
Machine 15	Released: 7 April 2008; Label: Burning Heart, Epitaph; Formats: CD, DL	9	11	63	—	34	—	—	—	33	—	
True Brew	Released: 22 April 2015; Label: Burning Heart, Epitaph; Formats: CD, DL	15	16	21	—	28	—	—	—	9	33	
SOS	Released: 15 February 2019; Label: Epitaph; Formats: CD, DL	15	32	22	—	19	—	—	—	4	15	
"—" denotes a recording that did not chart or was not released in that territory.

=== Compilation albums ===
Title	Album details	Peak chart positions
Title	Album details	AUS
The Melancholy Collection	Released: 29 July 1999; Label: Burning Heart / Epitaph	72
The Melancholy Connection	Released: 29 May 2012; Label: Epitaph	—

=== Video albums ===
Year	Album details
1999	Millencolin and the Hi-8 Adventures: Released: 1999; Label: Burning Heart / Epitaph
2008	Machine 15 Limited edition DVD: Released: 7 April 2008; Label: Burning Heart / Epitaph
2012	A Pennybridge Production: Released: 29 May 2012; Label: Epitaph

=== Soundtrack albums ===
Year	Album details
1998	Millencolin... and the Hi-8 Adventures: Released: 1998; Label: Burning Heart Records

=== Split albums ===
Year	Album details
2001	Millencolin / Midtown: Released: 28 May 2001; Label: Golf Records

== Extended plays ==
Year	EP details
1993	Use Your Nose: Released: 4 December 1993; Label: Burning Heart
1994	Skauch: Released: 23 July 1994; Label: Burning Heart
2001	No Cigar: Released: 8 May 2001; Label: Burning Heart / Epitaph
2016	True Brew: Released: 26 February 2016; Label: De Nihil Records

== Demotapes ==
Year	Album details
1993	Goofy: Released: 1993; Label: Self-released
1993	Melack: Released: 1993; Label: Self-released

== Singles ==
Title	Year	Peak chart positions			Album
Title	Year	SWE	AUS	UK Rock	Album
"Da Strike"	1994	19	—	—	Tiny Tunes
"The Story of My Life"	1995	10	—	—	Life on a Plate
"Move Your Car"	1996	9	—	—	Life on a Plate
"Lozin' Must"	1997	29	—	—	For Monkeys
"Twenty Two"	1997	—	—	—	For Monkeys
"Penguins & Polarbears"	2000	54	—	8	Pennybridge Pioneers
"Fox"	2000	—	—	—	Pennybridge Pioneers
"Kemp"	2002	60	69	—	Home from Home
"Man or Mouse"	2002	—	—	28	Home from Home
"Battery Check/E20 Norr"	2003	36	—		Home from Home
"Ray"	2005	21	—	—	Kingwood
"Shut You Out"	2005	21	—	—	Kingwood
"Detox"	2008	—	—	—	Machine 15
"Broken World"	2008	—	—	—	Machine 15
"Örebro"	2009	—	—	—	Non-album single
"Carry You"	2012	—	—	—	The Melancholy Connection
"Bring Me Home"	2015	—	—	—	True Brew
"True Brew" / "Inte Vara Ägd"	2015	—	—	—	True Brew
"SOS"	2019	—	—	—	SOS
"Sour Days"	2019	—	—	—	SOS

== Music videos ==
Year	Song	Album
1994	"Da Strike"	Tiny Tunes
1995	"The Story of My Life"	Life on a Plate
1996	"Move Your Car"	Life on a Plate
1997	"Lozin' Must"	For Monkeys
2000	"Penguins & Polarbears"	Pennybridge Pioneers
2000	"Fox"	Pennybridge Pioneers
2002	"Kemp"	Home from Home
2002	"Man or Mouse"	Home from Home
2003	"Battery Check" / "E20 Norr"	Home from Home
2005	"Ray"	Kingwood
2005	"Shut You Out"	Kingwood
2008	"Detox"	Machine 15
2015	"Sense & Sensibility"	True Brew
2015	"Bring Me Home"	True Brew
2016	"True Brew" / "Inte Vara Ägd"	True Brew
2019	"SOS"	SOS
2019	"Sour Days"	SOS
