= Millencolin and the Hi-8 Adventures =

Video by Millencolin
- Released: 23 November 1999
- Recorded: 1995–1998
- Genre: Punk rock
- Length: 74:00
- Label: Burning Heart

Millencolin and the Hi-8 Adventures is a video by Swedish punk rock band Millencolin, released on 23 November 1999 in VHS format by Burning Heart Records. The 74-minute home video was created by guitarist Erik Ohlsson during the course of the band's international tours.

It includes footage of the band on tour, both performing and amusing themselves on the road via activities such as skateboarding, bowling, visiting a zoo, and driving go-karts. It also includes a history of the band told by the members covering their career from 1992 to 1995, a number of live performances, and the music videos for the singles "Da Strike", "The Story of My Life", "Move Your Car", and "Lozin' Must". A soundtrack album to the film was also released in a limited run of 3,000 copies: 1,000 in Europe, 1,000 in the United States, and 1,000 in Australia. Millencolin and the Hi-8 Adventures was re-released in DVD format in 2003. The DVD added the music video for "Kemp" as well as a trailer for an upcoming sequel to the film.

== Live performances ==
The video features a number of the band's songs performed live at various locations during their international tours:

Song	Date	Location
"Leona"	October 1995	Turku, Finland
"Mr. Clean"	March 1996	Tokyo, Japan
"Dance Craze"	October 1996	Albuquerque, New Mexico, United States
"Olympic"	July 1997	Los Angeles, California, United States and Montreal, Quebec, Canada
"Twenty Two"	April 1998	Bordeaux, France
"Killercrush"	April 1998	Bordeaux, France
"Bullion"	October 1997	Sydney, Australia
"Monkey Boogie"	April 1998	Amsterdam, Netherlands and Strasbourg, France
"Random I Am"	August 1998	Rio de Janeiro, Curitiba and Porto Alegre, Brazil
"Airhead"	January 1998	San Diego, California, United States

== Soundtrack album ==
Millencolin and the Hi-8 Adventures Original Motion Picture Soundtrack

Soundtrack album by Millencolin
- Released: 1999
- Genre: Punk rock
- Label: Burning heart (Sweden), Epitaph (US), Shock (Australia)

Millencolin chronology
For Monkeys (1997)	Millencolin and the Hi-8 Adventures Original Motion Picture Soundtrack (1999)	The Melancholy Collection (1999)

The soundtrack to the film was released as an EP in limited quantities. Burning Heart Records produced 1,000 copies for the European market, while Epitaph Records released 1,000 copies in the United States and Shock Records released another 1,000 in Australia. The soundtrack includes the extended version of "Buzzer" which appeared in the film, as well as audio tracks of several of the film's live performances.

=== Track listing ===
1. "Buzzer" (extended version)
2. "Random I Am" (live)
3. "Puzzle" (live)
4. "Dance Craze" (live)
5. "Move Your Car" (live)
6. "Killercrush" (live)
7. "Bullion" (live)
8. "Twenty Two" (live)

=== Personnel ===
==== Millencolin ====
- Nikola Šarčević - lead vocals, bass
- Erik Ohlsson - guitar
- Mathias Färm - guitar
- Fredrik Larzon - drums
