= The Melancholy Connection =

Compilation album by Millencolin
- Released: 29 May 2012
- Recorded: 2000–2012
- Genre: Punk rock
- Label: Burning Heart, Epitaph
- Producer: Millencolin

Millencolin chronology
Machine 15 (2008)	The Melancholy Connection (2012)	True Brew (2015)

Singles from The Melancholy Connection
- 1. "Carry You" Released: 8 June 2012

The Melancholy Connection is a compilation album with a bonus DVD by Swedish punk rock band Millencolin, released in 2012. It follows up The Melancholy Collection which also contained rare and unreleased tracks. The DVD features a documentary that looks inside the making of Pennybridge Pioneers, with archival footage of the band and Bad Religion/Epitaph founder Brett Gurewitz who produced Pennybridge Pioneers and played acoustic guitar on "The Ballad".

The compilation contains the two newly recorded tracks "Carry You" and "Out from Nowhere".

Punk News began streaming the album in its entirety on 23 May 2012.

== Track listing ==
Track	Song	Recorded	Appeared on
01	"Carry You"	2012	New song
02	"Out from Nowhere"	2012	New song
03	"Absolute Zero"	2002	Kemp (single)
04	"Mind the Mice"	2008	Machine 15 (iTunes bonus track)
05	"The Downhill Walk"	2002	Kemp (single)
06	"E20 Norr"	2003	E20 Norr (single)
07	"Bull by the Horns"	2002	Man or Mouse (single)
08	"Junkie for Success"	2008	Detox (single)
09	"Dinner Dog"	2000	Penguins & Polarbears (single)
10	"Ratboys Masterplan"	2005	Shut You Out (single)
11	"Phony Tony"	2005	Ray (single)
12	"Queens Gambit"	2000	Penguins & Polarbears (single)
13	"Bowmore"	2003	Battery Check (single)
14	"Into the Maze"	2002	Man or Mouse (single)

== A Pennybridge Production ==
The CD is paired with a 90-minute DVD that takes fans inside the making of Pennybridge Pioneers with never before seen archival footage, interviews with the band, and live performance in Cologne, Germany.

=== Track listing ===
1. Intro
2. Hollywood
3. Material Boy (Live)
4. Duck Pond (Live)
5. Recording
6. Hellman (Live)
7. Drums
8. Highway Donkey (Live)
9. Stop to Think (Live)
10. Guitars
11. Right About Now (Live)
12. Working Titles
13. A-Ten (Live)
14. Vocals
15. Devil's Me (Live)
16. Penguin Vocals
17. Penguins Video Shoot
18. Penguins and Polarbears Video
19. Backups
20. The Mayfly (Live)
21. Checkmate
22. Pepper (Live)
23. Fox Video Shoot
24. Fox Video
25. One More
26. The Ballad (Live)

=== Bonus ===
1. No Cigar (Live)
2. Fox (Live)
3. Penguins and Polarbears (Live)
