= No Cigar =

EP by Millencolin
- Released: 8 May 2001
- Genre: Punk rock; skate punk
- Length: 21:02 (North American version)
- Label: Burning Heart (Sweden); Epitaph (North America); Shock (Australia)

Millencolin chronology
Pennybridge Pioneers (2000)	No Cigar (2001)	Millencolin / Midtown (2001)

No Cigar is an EP by Swedish punk rock band Millencolin, released on 8 May 2001 by Burning Heart Records in Sweden, Epitaph Records in North America, and Shock Records in Australia. It appears as the opening track from their fourth album Pennybridge Pioneers (2000), where the track originated, and the EP itself is an extended single release. The North American release includes "No Cigar" as well as the tracks from the album's other two singles, "Penguins & Polarbears" and "Fox". In Australia, "No Cigar" was released as an enhanced CD single including the band's songs from their split EP with Midtown as well as four videos. "No Cigar" was also featured on the soundtrack to the video game Tony Hawk's Pro Skater 2 as well as the game's re-releases Tony Hawk's Pro Skater HD and Tony Hawk's Pro Skater 1 + 2. It is the third track on Epitaph Records' compilation Punk-O-Rama #5, released in 2000.

In September 2021 Nikola Šarčević, Tony Hawk, and Steve Caballero teamed up with Mikey And His Uke to do a cover of the song with lead vocals by Tony. The song also features Mikey Hawdon from Fairmounts on guitar and Darrin Pfeiffer from Goldfinger on drums. The music video was made by MICHAELxCrusty at Crusty Media and the song was mixed and mastered by Steve Rizun at Drive Studios.

Punknews.org rated it three stars, calling it "too expensive EP for only 3 unreleased songs."

== Track listing ==
North American version
No.	Title	Length
1.	"No Cigar"	2:43
2.	"Penguins & Polarbears"	2:53
3.	"Queen's Gambit"	2:39
4.	"Dinner Dog"	1:45
5.	"Fox"	2:02
6.	"Kemp"	3:14
7.	"Penguins & Polarbears" (live)	3:08
8.	"No Cigar" (live)	2:38
Total length:		21:02

Australian version
No.	Title	Length
1.	"No Cigar"
2.	"Black Eye" (early version)
3.	"Buzzer" (extended version)

The Australian release includes enhanced CD content with the music videos for "Fox" and "Penguins & Polarbears", and live performances of "Pepper" and "Olympic" filmed at the Independiente Festival in Bologna, Italy.

== Personnel ==
=== Millencolin ===
- Nikola Šarčević - lead vocals, bass
- Erik Ohlsson - guitar
- Mathias Färm - guitar
- Fredrik Larzon - drums
