= Machine 15 =

Studio album by Millencolin
- Released: 22 March 2008
- Recorded: October–December 2007
- Genre: Pop punk, punk rock, alternative rock
- Length: 45:53
- Label: Burning Heart (Europe); Epitaph (North America)

Millencolin chronology
Kingwood (2005)	Machine 15 (2008)	The Melancholy Connection (2012)

Singles from Machine 15
- 1. "Detox" Released: 28 March 2008; 2. "Broken World" Released: 23 July 2008

Professional ratings
Review scores
Source	Rating
AllMusic	3.5/5 stars
Europunk.net	2.5/5 stars
musicOMH	1/5 stars
Rocklouder	4/5 stars
ThePunkSite.com	4/5 stars

Machine 15 is the seventh studio album by Swedish punk rock band Millencolin.

== Release ==
Machine 15 was made available for streaming on 1 May through the band's Myspace profile. It was released in 2008 on various dates in different regions: 22 March in Australia, 7 April in Europe, 6 May in North America, and 21 May in Japan. Millencolin recorded parts of the album with the Swedish Chamber Orchestra from Örebro. A limited-edition version included a DVD of a live performance in Stockholm in 2003. In March 2009, the band went on a tour of North America.

== Track listing ==
All songs written by Nikola Šarčević, except where noted.

1. "Machine 15" - 2:29
2. "Done is Done" - 3:50
3. "Detox" - 3:37
4. "Vicious Circle" - 4:11
5. "Broken World" (Mathias Färm) - 3:08
6. "Come On" - 3:38
7. "Centerpiece" - 0:10
8. "Who's Laughing Now" (Färm, Šarčević) - 3:07
9. "Brand New Game" (Färm, Šarčević) - 3:28
10. "Ducks & Drakes" - 3:18
11. "Turnkey Paradise" (Färm, Šarčević) - 3:15
12. "Route One" - 3:30
13. "Danger for Stranger" - 2:59
14. "Saved by Hell" - 3:38
15. "End Piece" - 1:32

=== Bonus tracks ===
1. "Machine 15" (acoustic) (Japanese release)
2. "Farewell My Hell" (acoustic) (Japanese release)
3. "Mind the Mice" - 3:32 (iTunes bonus track)

=== Limited edition DVD track listing ===
All songs performed live in Stockholm in 2003.

1. "No Cigar" - 3:45
2. "Bullion" - 1:57
3. "Man or Mouse" - 2:58
4. "Material Boy" - 2:14
5. "Duckpond" - 2:47
6. "Kemp" - 4:14

== Charts ==
Chart performance for Machine 15
Chart (2008)	Peak position
Australian Albums (ARIA)	11
Austrian Albums (Ö3 Austria)	63
German Albums (Offizielle Top 100)	34
Swedish Albums (Sverigetopplistan)	9
Swiss Albums (Schweizer Hitparade)	84
UK Independent Albums (OCC)	29

== Personnel ==
=== Millencolin ===
- Nikola Šarčević – lead vocals, bass, percussion, keyboards
- Erik Ohlsson – guitar, keyboards, album artwork
- Mathias Färm – guitar, percussion, keyboards, assistant engineer, editing
- Fredrik Larzon – drums, percussion

=== Additional musicians ===
- Roger Olsson – violin
- Hans Elvkull – violin
- Linn Elvkull – viola
- Hanna Thorell – cello

=== Production ===
- Lou Giordano – producer and engineer, percussion, keyboards
- Michael Libert – mixing at Hansa Mixroom
- Jim Brumby – assistant engineer, editing
- Thomas Maringer – assistant engineer
- George Marino – mastering at Sterlin Sound
- Dino Medanhodzic – editing
