= Move Your Car =

Single by Millencolin

from the album Life on a Plate
- B-side: "Entrance at Rudebrook"; "An Elf and His Zippo"
- Released: March 1996
- Recorded: January 1996 at Unisound in Örebro, Sweden
- Genre: Ska punk, melodic hardcore
- Length: 6:17
- Label: Burning Heart
- Songwriter(s): Mathias Färm, Fredrik Larzon, Erik Ohlsson, Nikola Šarčević

Millencolin singles chronology
"The Story of My Life" (1995)	"Move Your Car" (1996)	"Lozin' Must" (1997)

"Move Your Car" is a song by Swedish punk rock band Millencolin from the album Life on a Plate. It was released as a single on 26 October 1996 by Burning Heart Records, including two B-sides from the album's recording sessions, "Entrance at Rudebrook" and "An Elf and His Zippo". These two tracks were re-released, the former in 1997 on the band's next recording For Monkeys, the latter in 1999 on the compilation album The Melancholy Collection. An accompanying music video for "Move Your Car" was filmed and included in Millencolin and the Hi-8 Adventures. A Creature from the Black Lagoon pinball game inspired the song's title and the cover art.

== Track listing ==
1. "Move Your Car"
2. "Entrance at Rudebrook"
3. "An Elf and His Zippo"

== Personnel ==
=== Millencolin ===
- Nikola Šarčević - lead vocals, bass
- Erik Ohlsson - guitar
- Mathias Färm - guitar
- Fredrik Larzon - drums
