= Lozin' Must =

Single by Millencolin

from the album For Monkeys
- B-side: "Israelites"; "The Story of My Life" (remix); "Vixen"
- Released: 6 April 1997
- Recorded: Unisound in Örebro and Studio Punk Palace
- Genre: Pop punk
- Label: Burning Heart (Sweden); Epitaph (US)
- Songwriter(s): Mathias Färm, Fredrik Larzon, Erik Ohlsson, Nikola Šarčević

Millencolin singles chronology
"Move Your Car" (1996)	"Lozin' Must" (1997)	"Twenty Two" (1997)

"Lozin' Must" is a song by Swedish punk rock band Millencolin from the album For Monkeys. It was released as a single on 6 April 1997 by Burning Heart Records and Epitaph Records, including two B-sides from the album's recording sessions, "Israelites" and "Vixen". These two tracks were re-released in 1999 on the compilation album The Melancholy Collection. The U.S. version of "Lozin' Must" released by Epitaph also includes a remix of "The Story of My Life", a song from the album Life on a Plate which had previously been released as a single. An accompanying music video for "Lozin' Must" was also filmed and released.

In Australia the song "Twenty Two" was released in place of "Lozin' Must" at the insistence of Shock Records, over concerns that "Lozin' Must" contained profanity.

== Track listing ==
CD single (Europe)

1. "Lozin' Must"
2. "Israelites" (originally performed by Desmond Dekker)
3. "Vixen"

CD single (US)

1. "Lozin' Must"
2. "Israelites"
3. "The Story of My Life" (remix)
4. "Vixen"

7" vinyl

- Side A:
1. "Lozin' Must"
2. "Israelites"
- Side A:
1. "The Story of My Life" (remix)
2. "Vixen"

== Personnel ==
=== Millencolin ===
- Nikola Šarčević - lead vocals, bass guitar
- Erik Ohlsson - guitar
- Mathias Färm - guitar
- Fredrik Larzon - drums
