= Shut You Out =

Single by Millencolin

from the album Kingwood
- B-side: "Ratboy's Masterplan"
- Released: 24 October 2005
- Genre: Punk rock
- Length: 5:53
- Label: Burning Heart
- Songwriters: Mathias Färm, Fredrik Larzon, Erik Ohlsson, Nikola Šarčević,

Millencolin singles chronology
"Ray" (2005)	"Shut You Out" (2005)	"Detox" (2008)

"Shut You Out" is a song by the Swedish punk rock band Millencolin from the album Kingwood. It was released as a single on 24 October 2005, by Burning Heart Records, including the B-side song "Ratboy's Masterplan" from the album's recording sessions. An accompanying music video for "Shut You Out" was also filmed and released, with visual styles based upon the 2005 film Sin City.

== Track listing ==
1. "Shut You Out"
2. "Ratboy's Masterplan"

== Personnel ==
=== Millencolin ===
- Nikola Šarčević - lead vocals, bass
- Erik Ohlsson - guitar
- Mathias Färm - guitar
- Fredrik Larzon - drums

== Chart performance ==
Chart (2005)	Peak position
Sweden (Sverigetopplistan)	21
