= Home from Home (album) =

Studio album by Millencolin
- Released: 12 March 2002
- Recorded: September–October 2001
- Studio: Little Big Room, Haninge, Sweden
- Genre: Pop punk; punk rock; alternative rock
- Length: 36:53
- Label: Burning Heart, Epitaph
- Producer: Lou Giordano

Millencolin chronology
Pennybridge Pioneers (2000)	Home from Home (2002)	Kingwood (2005)

Singles from Home from Home
- 1. "Kemp" Released: 18 February 2002; 2. "Man or Mouse" Released: 30 September 2002; 3. "Battery Check" Released: 3 July 2003

Professional ratings
Review scores
Source	Rating
AllMusic	4/5 stars
Ox-Fanzine	Favorable

Home from Home is the fifth album by Swedish punk band Millencolin, released on 12 March 2002 by Epitaph Records. The songs "Kemp", "Man or Mouse", and "Battery Check" were each released as singles with accompanying music videos.

== Production ==
In April 2001, Millencolin were reportedly writing and rehearsing new material in their hometown Örebro, Sweden, in anticipation of recording their next album with Mark Trombino. Home from Home was instead recorded with producer Lou Giordano at Little Big Room Studios in Haninge, Sweden between 15 September and 17 October 2001. Giordano also acted as engineer, with assistance from Mats Lindfors, Fredrik Andersson, and Ernie. Giordano mixed the recordings over the course of two weeks, before they were mastered by Peter In de Betou at Cutting Room.

== Release ==
On 5 December 2001, Home from Home was announced for released in early 2002. Six days later, the album's track listing was revealed. "Man or Mouse" was posted on the band's website on 4 January 2002. "Kemp" was released as a single on 23 January 2001. On 2 February 2001, "Fingers Crossed" was made available for download after playing a game on the band's website. In February and March 2002, the band toured across Australia and New Zealand. On 7 March 2002, the music video for "Kemp" was posted online; it was animated by Kalle Haglund, the former vocalist of Voice of a Generation. Home from Home was released on 11 March 2002 in Europe through Burning Heart, and the following day in the US through Epitaph. While on tour in the US, drummer Fredrik Larzon injured his elbow, which required him to fly back to Sweden for surgery; he was temporarily replaced by Thomas Falk of Bombshell Rocks.

In April and May 2002, the band toured across Europe with the Donots and Anti-Flag. Their substitute drummer Kjell Ramstedt of No Fun at All became ill, resulting in the cancellation a show; the show prior to that, Ramstedt had fainted, which caused the band's set to be shorted. Larzon's injury had healed, with him returning to the band in time for an appearance at Ozzfest. Millencolin was due tour the UK in December, with Brand New; however, the tour was cancelled. In April and May 2003, the group embarked on a west coast and then east coast treks of the US. The former was supported by Rufio and River City High (who left partway through the tour and were replaced by Ten Foot Pole), while the latter was planned to be supported by American Hi-Fi and the Unseen. Prior to the start of the east coast leg, the tour was cancelled due to family issues. It was revealed shortly afterwards that the cancellation was a result of frontman Nikola Šarčević's brother having gone missing. The band subsequently rescheduled the east coast shows to November 2003, which were supported by Senses Fail; Wakefield was also due to support, but because of recording conflicts they were replaced by Matchbook Romance.

== Track listing ==
All music and lyrics by Nikola Šarčević, except where noted.

1. "Man or Mouse" – 3:04
2. "Fingers Crossed" – 2:47
3. "Black Eye" (music: Sarcevic/Mathias Färm) – 3:13
4. "Montego" – 3:00
5. "Punk Rock Rebel" – 3:06
6. "Kemp" (music: Sarcevic/Färm) – 3:26
7. "Botanic Mistress" – 2:11
8. "Happiness for Dogs" (music: Sarcevic/Färm) – 3:25
9. "Battery Check" (music: Sarcevic/Färm) – 3:20
10. "Fuel to the Flame" – 1:54
11. "Afghan" (music: Sarcevic/Färm) – 2:42
12. "Greener Grass" (music: Sarcevic/Färm) – 2:50
13. "Home from Home" (lyrics: Sarcevic/Marten Cedergran) – 2:13
14. "Absolute Zero" – 2:42 (Japanese and Brazilian release only)
15. "The Downhill Walk" – 2:25 (Japanese and Brazilian release only)

== Personnel ==
Personnel per sleeve and booklet.

Millencolin

- Nikola Šarčević – lead vocals, bass
- Erik Ohlsson – guitar
- Mathias Färm – guitar
- Fredrik Larzon – drums

Additional musicians

- Marten Cedergran – vocals (track 13)
- Mats Lindfors – piano (track 9)

Production and design

- Lou Giordano – producer, engineer, mixing
- Mats Lindfors – assistant engineer
- Fredrik Andersson – assistant engineer
- Ernie – assistant engineer
- Peter In de Betou – mastering
- Erik Ohlsson – cover artwork

== Year-end charts ==
Chart (2002)	Position
Australian Albums (ARIA)	3
Austrian Albums (Ö3 Austria)	25
Canadian Alternative Albums (Nielsen SoundScan)	120
French Albums (SNEP)	91
German Albums (Offizielle Top 100)	29
New Zealand Albums (RMNZ)	29
Norwegian Albums (VG-lista)	36
Swedish Albums (Sverigetopplistan)	6
Swiss Albums (Schweizer Hitparade)	31
UK Albums (OCC)	90
UK Independent Albums (OCC)	18
UK Rock & Metal Albums (OCC)	12
