= Da Strike =

Single by Millencolin

from the album Tiny Tunes/Same Old Tunes
- B-side: "Softworld"; "Shake Me" (live); "Niap"
- Released: 16 December 1994
- Recorded: 1994
- Genre: Ska punk, punk rock
- Label: Burning Heart
- Songwriter(s): Mathias Färm, Fredrik Larzon, Erik Ohlsson, Nikola Šarčević

Millencolin singles chronology
"Da Strike" (1994)	"The Story of My Life" (1995)

"Da Strike" is a song by Swedish punk rock band Millencolin from the album Tiny Tunes (later re-released as Same Old Tunes). It was released as a single on 16 December 1994 by Burning Heart Records, including two B-sides from the album's recording sessions, "Softworld" and "Niap", along with a live recording of "Shake Me". "Niap" is a re-recording of the song "Pain" from the band's first EP Use Your Nose. "Softworld" reappeared on the band's next album Life on a Plate, while "Niap" and the live version of "Shake Me" were re-released in 1999 on the compilation album The Melancholy Collection. An accompanying music video for "Da Strike" was also filmed and released. "Da Strike" also appeared in the game ESPN X Games Pro Boarder for the PS1.

== Track listing ==
CD single

1. "Da Strike"
2. "Softworld"
3. "Shake Me" (live)
4. "Niap"

7" vinyl

- Side A:
1. "Da Strike"
2. "Softworld"
- Side B:
1. "Shake Me" (live)
2. "Niap"

== Personnel ==
=== Millencolin ===
- Nikola Šarčević - lead vocals, bass
- Erik Ohlsson - guitar
- Mathias Färm - guitar
- Fredrik Larzon - drums

=== Additional musicians ===
Fredrik Folcke - saxophone
