= Kingwood (album) =

Studio album by Millencolin
- Released: 30 March 2005
- Recorded: August–October 2004
- Studio: Fascination Street, Örebro, Sweden; Music-A-Matic, Gothenburg, Sweden; Soundlab, Örebro, Sweden
- Genre: Punk rock; skate punk; pop punk; alternative rock
- Length: 34:07
- Label: Burning Heart (Sweden), Epitaph (US)
- Producer: Chips Kiesbye

Millencolin chronology
Home from Home (2002)	Kingwood (2005)	Machine 15 (2008)

Singles from Kingwood
- 1. "Ray" Released: 14 March 2005; 2. "Shut You Out" Released: 24 October 2005

Professional ratings
Review scores
Source	Rating
AllMusic	3.5/5 stars
IGN	4.9/10
PopMatters	7/10 stars
Punknews.org	4/5 stars
Sputnikmusic	3/5 stars
Star Pulse	3/5 stars

Kingwood is the sixth album by Swedish punk rock band Millencolin, released on 30 March 2005 in Sweden and 12 April 2005 in North America and the UK. The song "Farewell My Hell" originated as an idea for singer Nikola Šarčević's first solo album, but was used for Kingwood instead. "Farewell My Hell" was played prominently in the Swedish vampire comedy horror film Frostbite.

== Release ==
On 26 January 2005, Kingwood was announced for release in two months' time. On 1 March 2005, "Biftek Supernova" was posted online for free download. The music video for "Ray" was posted online on 8 March 2005; the track was released as the album's lead single eight days later. Kingwood was released in Europe on 28 March 2005, and in the United States on 14 April 2005. They went a tour of Europe with Street Dogs and the Lawrence Arms in April 2005, which was followed by on a West Coast US tour the following month with Boys Night Out and Roses Are Red. Between mid June and mid August, the group went on the 2005 edition of Warped Tour. Two singles from the album were released: "Ray" and "Shut You Out".

== Track listing ==
All songs written by Nikola Šarčević and Mathias Färm, except where noted.

1. "Farewell My Hell" (Sarcevic) - 2:52
2. "Birdie" - 2:32
3. "Cash or Clash" (Sarcevic) - 2:40
4. "Shut You Out" - 3:39
5. "Biftek Supernova" (Sarcevic) - 2:18
6. "My Name is Golden" - 3:08
7. "Ray" - 2:52
8. "Novo" - 2:58
9. "Simple Twist of Hate" - 1:29
10. "Stalemate" - 3:18
11. "Mooseman's Jukebox" - 2:12
12. "Hard Times" (Sarcevic) - 4:09
13. "Phony Tony" (Japanese release only) - 2:59

== Personnel ==
=== Millencolin ===
- Nikola Šarčević - lead vocals, bass
- Erik Ohlsson - guitar
- Mathias Färm - guitar
- Fredrik Larzon - drums

== Charts ==
Chart performance for Kingwood
Chart (2005)	Peak position
Australian Albums (ARIA)	12
Austrian Albums (Ö3 Austria)	41
French Albums (SNEP)	135
German Albums (Offizielle Top 100)	46
Italian Albums (FIMI)	79
Norwegian Albums (VG-lista)	33
Swedish Albums (Sverigetopplistan)	2
Swiss Albums (Schweizer Hitparade)	59
UK Independent Albums (OCC)	25
UK Rock & Metal Albums (OCC)	19
