= True Brew (EP) =

EP by Millencolin
- Released: 26 February 2016
- Genre: Punk rock, skate punk
- Length: 12:27
- Label: De Nihil Records (vinyl); Epitaph (digitally)
- Producer: Mathias Färm, Nikola Šarčević

Millencolin chronology
True Brew (2015)	True Brew (2016)

True Brew is an EP by Swedish punk rock band Millencolin, released on 26 February 2016 by De Nihil Records on 12" vinyl, as well as digitally by Epitaph Records. The song "True Brew" was originally featured on Millencolin's eighth studio album, True Brew, which was released in April 2015 via Epitaph. "True Brew is one of our absolute favorite tracks off the album and if you haven't heard the album yet this is a great way to get what the album's about", explained drummer Fredrik Larzon. "This song also sums up exactly what our band is about in the lyrics and to spice it up even more we decided to also do the alternative version in Swedish which turned out great."

== Track listing ==
12" vinyl

- Side A:
1. "True Brew"
2. "Balanced Boy"
- Side B:
1. "Inte Vara Ägd"
2. "Heart vs Mind"

== Video clip ==
A new video clip it was filmed during the South American tour in 2015. They release two videos, "True Brew" and "Inte Vara Ägd" (swedish version). The external scenes were recorded in Fortaleza, Brazil. Shot and directed by Adam Holmkvist.
