= Twenty Two (Millencolin song) =

Single by Millencolin

from the album For Monkeys
- B-side: "Israelites"; "Vixen"
- Released: 6 April 1997
- Recorded: Unisound in Örebro and Studio Punk Palace
- Genre: Punk rock, melodic hardcore
- Label: Shock

Millencolin singles chronology
"Lozin' Must" (1997)	"Twenty Two" (1997)	"Penguins & Polarbears" (2000)

"Twenty Two" is a song by the Swedish punk rock band Millencolin from the album For Monkeys. It was released as a single on 6 April 1997 by Shock Records, including two B-sides from the album's recording sessions, "Israelites" and "Vixen". These two tracks were re-released in 1999 on the compilation album The Melancholy Collection. "Twenty Two" was released only in Australia, in place of "Lozin' Must" which was released as the album's single in Europe and the United States, because "Lozin' Must" contained profanity.

== Track listing ==
1. "Twenty Two"
2. "Israelites" (originally performed by Desmond Dekker)
3. "Vixen"

== Personnel ==
=== Millencolin ===
- Nikola Šarčević - lead vocals, bass
- Erik Ohlsson - guitar
- Mathias Färm - guitar
- Fredrik Larzon - drums
