= Ray (song) =

Single by Millencolin

from the album Kingwood
- B-side: "Phony Tony"; "Bullion" (live)
- Released: 14 March 2005
- Genre: Skate punk
- Label: Burning Heart
- Songwriter(s): Mathias Färm, Fredrik Larzon, Erik Ohlsson, Nikola Šarčević

Millencolin singles chronology
| "Battery Check" (2003) | "Ray" (2005) | "Shut You Out" (2005) |

"Ray" is a song by the Swedish punk rock band Millencolin from the album Kingwood. It was released as a single on 14 March 2005 by Burning Heart Records, including the B-side song "Phony Tony" from the album's recording sessions and a live recording of "Bullion". An accompanying music video for "Ray" was also filmed and released.

== Track listing ==
1. "Ray"
2. "Phony Tony"
3. "Bullion" (live)

== Personnel ==
=== Millencolin ===
- Nikola Šarčević - lead vocals, bass
- Erik Ohlsson - guitar
- Mathias Färm - guitar
- Fredrik Larzon - drums
