= Urma Sellinger =

Swedish band

- Origin: Stockholm, Sweden
- Genres: Metalcore, post-hardcore
- Years active: 2010
- Members: Olle Johansson (vocals); Alex Borg (vocals); Eric Lindqvist (guitar); Andree Borg (guitar); Anton Lindqvist (bass guitar); John Eriksson (drums)
- Past members: Axel Vålvik (bass guitar)
- Website: http://www.myspace.com/urmasellinger

Urma Sellinger is a post-hardcore band based in Stockholm, Sweden.

== History ==
Urma Sellinger was founded in Stockholm in 2010 as In Flames inspired death metal band. After a gig with Adept, the musicians got interested in post-hardcore and changed their musical style. A few months later, Urma Sellinger started working on their debut EP entitled Live Laugh Love after they contacted British producer Matt Hyde, who worked together with Bullet for My Valentine, Gallows, Funeral for a Friend and Architects.

In summer 2010, they flew to London to start recording the EP in Hyde's Bro Studio. The EP was released digital, download (iTunes, Spotify). One week after release of Live Laugh Love became the most listened EP on MySpace.

The band was voted as "People's Choice" to the Moshpit Open Air due to the success of the EP. At 2010's Moshpit Open Air, Urma Sellinger played alongside acts Enter Shikari, The Ghost Inside, Yashin, We Are the Ocean, Shadows Chasing Ghosts, Tek-one and Bionic Ghost Kids at Folkets Park, Nykvarn, Stockholm. With their song “Far from Sandra” Urma Sellinger entered Check In Music a voting contest where the winner artist got signed to Universal Records for producing a Single record. Urma Sellinger ranked on place 7. On 20 May 2010 Urma Sellinger played at Emergenza where the band ranked on fourth place at the national final.

In February 2011 Urma Sellinger announced that they will be working together with Matt Hyde again on their debutalbum. The band worked at Lunatic Studios in Gävle on the album. Some workings on the album were recorded at Bro Studios in London. On 16 April 2011 Urma Sellinger was support act for Swedish metal band All Ends who played in Västeras at “Healing Through Music”. At the end of May the band and bassist Axel Vålvik parted ways for personal reasons. In November the band announced that Eric's brother Anton Lindqvist will be their new bass player. Urma Sellinger played at Monsterstage in Gothenburg on 30 June. On 5 August 2011 the band shared stage with Embrace Elijah and Hollows in Jönköping. Urma Sellinger published “Plastic Smile” on MySpace and Facebook. Urma Sellinger played at Pepp Fest at Haninge Kulturhus in Stockholm together with Intohimo, You Ate My Dog and Promise Divine.

On 8 December 2011 Urma Sellinger released “For Those We've Lost” as a download single via Amazon, iTunes and Spotify. “For Those We've Lost” aired first time at Bandit Rock on 22 November 2011. Some songs are aired at Australian online radio podcast The Pit FM. The debut album entitled Urma Sellinger was released on 26 January 2012.

On 25 February 2012 Urma Sellinger played as main support for Adept at Klubben in Stockholm. Urma Sellinger entered “Ringrocker band contest”, where the winning band get a slot as Newcomer at 2012's Rock am Ring festival. Urma Sellinger signed a contract with 2012-founded management Madison Music Group. They were going on tour with Walking with Strangers on their “Hardships Tour”, which was cancelled before the first show. Urma Sellinger played at Sweden's biggest festival, Peace & Love (festival), on 27 June 2012 and will tour the United Kingdom in August. The band was featured on the Panic & Action label sampler We Curse the Day You Were Fucking Born with their song Crown the Liar. It was released digitally on 15 October 2012.

In March 2013 the band was set to absolve their first tour throughout mainland Europe tour with Shadows Chasing Ghosts and Turn the Tables from Norway but the tour got cancelled due to a broken van of Shadows Chasing Ghosts. Only the UK gigs were played. On 16 April 2013 the band released the 4-track-EP A Thousand Days digitally only. Alongside with Now, Voyager from Belgium Urma Sellinger was support band for Bury Tomorrow during their Scandinavia tour which lead the bands throughout Sweden, Norway and Denmark in May. Due to a vocal illness the band and their vocalist Alex Borg announced that they are looking for a new member. Guitarist Eric Lindqvist became the new vocalist of the band.

== Musical style ==
Urma Sellinger plays Post hardcore which is influenced by Silverstein. Band members named bands like Slipknot and Bullet for My Valentine as their influences. The lyrics deals with personal experiences and emotions of the musicians. Some songs shows how the band see the world. The musicians describes Urma Sellinger as an unpolitical band. Some lyrics deals with themes like love and hate on a personal view.

== Discography ==
=== EPs ===
- 2010: Live Laugh Love

=== Albums ===
- 2012: Urma Sellinger
