= Skauch =

EP by Millencolin
- Released: 23 July 1994
- Recorded: May 1994 at Unisound Studios in Finspång, Sweden
- Genre: Punk rock
- Length: 13:55
- Label: Burning Heart
- Producer: Millencolin, Dan Swanö

Millencolin chronology
Use Your Nose (1993)	Skauch (1994)	Same Old Tunes (1994)

Skauch is an EP by Swedish punk rock band Millencolin, released on 23 July 1994 by Burning Heart Records. It was originally intended to be a single for the song "The Einstein Crew" from the album Tiny Tunes, but the band decided to record additional cover songs and extend the single into an EP. All of the songs from the EP, with the exception of "The Einstein Crew", were re-released on the 1999 compilation album The Melancholy Collection.

The cover of the EP shows a yellow bird that has also appeared on several of the band's other releases. The circular "Millencolin Skauch" logo in the upper right corner imitates the logo of the Foundation skateboarding company.

== Track listing ==
1. "The Einstein Crew" – 3:07
2. "Yellow Dog" – 2:58
3. "Knowledge" (originally performed by Operation Ivy) – 1:31
4. "A Whole Lot Less" (originally performed by Sub Society) – 1:55
5. "Coolidge" (originally performed by the Descendents) – 2:24
6. "That's Up to Me" (originally performed by Scumback) – 2:00

== Personnel ==
=== Millencolin ===
- Nikola Šarčević - lead vocals, bass
- Erik Ohlsson - guitar
- Mathias Färm - guitar
- Fredrik Larzon - drums
