= Lock-Sport-Krock =

Studio album by Nikola Šarčević
- Released: 13 July 2004
- Recorded: July 2003
- Genre: Folk rock
- Length: 35:13
- Label: Burning Heart Records

Nikola Šarčević chronology
| Lock-Sport-Krock (2004) | Roll Roll and Flee (2006) |

Professional ratings
Review scores
| Source | Rating |
|---|---|
| AllMusic | link |

Lock-Sport-Krock is Nikola Šarčević's debut solo album. This folk rock album is a marked departure from Šarčević's work with his punk rock band Millencolin. The album produced one single, "Lovetrap".

== Track listing ==
1. "Lovetrap" (MP3) - 3:15
2. "Viola" - 3:21
3. "Nobody Without You" - 3:33
4. "Lock-Sport-Krock" - 3:05
5. "Glue Girl" - 2:55
6. "You Make My World Go Around" - 2:17
7. "New Fool" - 3:18
8. "Goodbye, I Die" - 3:40
9. "Mirror Man" - 2:34
10. "My Aim Is You" - 3:16
11. "Vila Rada" - 3:22
