= True Brew (album) =

Studio album by Millencolin
- Released: 22 April 2015
- Genres: Punk rock; alternative rock; skate punk
- Length: 34:42
- Label: Epitaph

Millencolin chronology
The Melancholy Connection (2012)	True Brew (2015)	SOS (2019)

Singles from True Brew
- 1. "Bring Me Home" Released: 30 April 2015

True Brew is the eighth studio album by Swedish punk rock band Millencolin. It was first released on 22 April 2015. Stylistically, True Brew returns to the faster punk rock sound of Millencolin's '90s releases and marks a departure from the more alternative rock-driven sound that dominated their albums since Pennybridge Pioneers. Unlike past releases, the album is more political in tone, evident in songs such as "Sense & Sensibility", which condemns the rise of right-wing populist parties in many countries of Europe.

== Track listing ==
1. "Egocentric Man" – 2:34
2. "Chameleon" – 2:58
3. "Autopilot Mode" – 2:00
4. "Bring Me Home" – 2:27
5. "Sense & Sensibility" – 2:37
6. "True Brew" – 3:22
7. "Perfection Is Boring" – 2:59
8. "Wall of Doubt" – 2:45
9. "Something I Would Die For" – 2:51
10. "Silent Suicide" – 1:20
11. "Man of 1000 Tics" – 2:52
12. "Mr. Fake Believe" – 2:36
13. "Believe in John" – 3:21

== Personnel ==
- Nikola Šarčević – lead vocals, bass
- Erik Ohlsson – guitar, keyboards, album artwork
- Mathias Färm – guitar, percussion, keyboards, assistant engineer, editing
- Fredrik Larzon – drums, percussion

== Charts ==
Chart performance for True Brew
Chart (2015)	Peak position
Australian Albums (ARIA)	16
Austrian Albums (Ö3 Austria)	21
Belgian Albums (Ultratop Flanders)	165
German Albums (Offizielle Top 100)	28
Swiss Albums (Schweizer Hitparade)	27
Swedish Albums (Sverigetopplistan)	22
