= Same Old Tunes =

Tiny Tunes / Same Old Tunes

Studio album by Millencolin
- Released: SWD – 28 October 1994; NA - 22 September 1998
- Recorded: August 1994 at Unisound Studios in Örebro, Sweden
- Genre: Ska punk, punk rock, melodic hardcore, Skate punk
- Length: 31:16
- Label: Burning Heart, Epitaph
- Producer: Millencolin

Millencolin chronology
Skauch (1993)	Tiny Tunes / Same Old Tunes (1994)	Life on a Plate (1995)

Singles from Tiny Tunes / Same Old Tunes
- 1. "Da Strike" Released: 16 December 1994

Alternative cover
- Cover of the re-release titled Same Old Tunes

Professional ratings
Review scores
Source	Rating
AllMusic	4/5 stars

Same Old Tunes is the debut album by Swedish punk rock band Millencolin, released on 28 October 1994 in Sweden by Burning Heart Records under the original title Tiny Tunes.

The song "Da Strike" was released as the album's single, with an accompanying music video.

== Controversy ==
The album's title and cover art mimicked the cartoon television show Tiny Toon Adventures, leading to a number of copyright infringement lawsuits against the band when the album was re-released in the United States on 22 September 1998 through Epitaph Records. Warner Bros, the owner of Tiny Toon Adventures, sued the record label and caused the band to change the title and cover art. They chose the title Same Old Tunes to reflect the fact that the album's track list had not changed.

The band also printed T-shirts for the song "Chiquita Chaser" that imitated the logo of Chiquita Brands International, who threatened them with a lawsuit causing them to cease production of the shirts.

== Track listing ==
All songs written by Nikola Šarčević except where noted.

No.	Title	Length
1.	"Mr. Clean"	2:41
2.	"Chiquita Chaser"	2:40
3.	"Diznee Time"	3:41
4.	"Domestic Subway"	1:38
5.	"Fazil's Friend"	1:52
6.	"Leona"	2:21
7.	"House of Blend"	2:56
8.	"Da Strike"	3:01
9.	"Mystic Reptile" (Mathias Färm)	2:45
10.	"Dance Craze"	2:01
11.	"The Einstein Crew"	2:58
12.	"Take It or Leave It"	2:43

== Personnel ==
=== Millencolin ===
- Nikola Šarčević – lead vocals, bass guitar
- Erik Ohlsson – guitar
- Mathias Färm – guitar
- Fredrik Larzon – drums

=== Additional musicians ===
- Fredrik Folcke – saxophone on "Da Strike"
