= Detoxification (disambiguation) =

Detoxification is the physiological or medicinal removal of toxic substances from a living organism, including the human body.

Detoxification, detoxication or detox may also refer to:

== Medicine and science ==
- Alcohol detoxification, medical treatment for alcohol dependence through the abrupt cessation
- Drug detoxification, any of various treatments for drug abuse or overdose
- Heavy metal detoxification, removal of toxic heavy metals from the body
  - Chelation therapy, a form of heavy metal detoxification involving the administration of chelating agents
- Drug metabolism, the process of metabolising and excreting a toxic substance into frp, a biological organism
- Environmental remediation, removal of pollutants from the environment
- Detoxification (alternative medicine), unscientific treatments purported to remove unspecified "toxins" from the body

== Technology ==
- Digital detox is a period of time when an individual refrains from using electronic connecting devices such as smartphones and computers.

== Popular culture ==
- Detox (Treble Charger album), 2002
- Detox (Natalie Pérez album), 2020
- Detox (One Ok Rock album), 2025
- "Detox" (song), a 2022 song by American rapper Lil Baby
- Detox, an unreleased album by Dr. Dre
- "Detox", a 2008 song by Millencolin
- "Detox", a 1997 song by Strapping Young Lad
- "Detox" (House), a 2005 episode of the medical drama House
- Detox Icunt, an American drag queen

== See also ==
- D-Tox, a 2002 American psychological thriller horror film directed by Jim Gillespie and starring Sylvester Stallone.
