= E20 Norr =

E20 Norr may refer to:

- the northern part of European route E20
- "E20 Norr", Swedish version of the 2003 single "Battery Check" by Millencolin
