= Fox (song) =

2000 single by Millencolin

Single by Millencolin

from the album Pennybridge Pioneers
- Released: 5 June 2000
- Genre: Skate punk, pop punk
- Label: Burning Heart
- Composers: Sarcevic; Mathias Färm

Millencolin singles chronology
"Penguins & Polarbears" (2000)	"Fox" (2000)	"Kemp" (2002)

"Fox" is a song by the Swedish punk rock band Millencolin from the album Pennybridge Pioneers. It was released as a single on 5 June 2000 by Burning Heart Records, including an early version of Kemp with different lyrics and two live songs recorded at the Hi-Fi bar in Melbourne, Australia, on 15 February 2000.

== Track listing ==
CD single

1. "Fox"
2. "Kemp" early version
3. "Penguins & Polarbears" (Live)
4. "No Cigar" (Live)

7" vinyl

- Side A:
1. "Fox"
2. "Kemp" early version
- Side B:
1. "Penguins & Polarbears" (Live)
2. "No Cigar" (Live)
