= State of Flow =

State Of Flow

Studio album by No Fun at All
- Released: 25 April 2000 (Sweden)
- Recorded: November 1999
- Studios: Underground in Västerås, Sweden. Mixed January 2000. Mastered at Cutting Room.
- Genre: Punk
- Length: European 47:25; Japanese 51:36
- Label: Burning Heart Records
- Producers: Produced & Mixed by: PO Saether and No Fun At All. Mastered at: Cutting Room, Solna by Peter In de Betou.

No Fun at All chronology
The Big Knockover (1997)	State Of Flow (2000)	Low Rider (2008)

Professional ratings
Review scores
Source	Rating
Kerrang!	2/5 stars

State Of Flow is the Swedish punk group No Fun at All's fourth album, released on 25 April 2000.

Music by Mikael Danielsson, Krister Johansson, Kjell Ramstedt and Stefan Neuman. Lyrics by Ingemar Jansson.

== Track listing ==
1. "Celestial Q&A"
2. "Waste Of Time"
3. "Second Best"
4. "Stumble And Fall"
5. "Not In The Mood"
6. "My Extraordinary Mind"
7. "FM Vanity"
8. "Joe Delord"
9. "Perfect Sense"
10. "Lessons Never Learned"
11. "The Slanderous Clientele"
12. "ESDS"
13. "Time Machine" (Bonus track on Japanese version, Sadistic Mika Band cover)
