= Battery Check =

Single by Millencolin

from the album Home from Home
- B-side: "E20 Norr"; "Bowmore"
- Released: 3 July 2003
- Genre: Punk rock
- Label: Burning Heart
- Songwriters: Mathias Färm, Fredrik Larzon, Erik Ohlsson, Nikola Šarčević,

Millencolin singles chronology
"Man or Mouse" (2002)	"Battery Check" (2003)	"Ray" (2005)

"Battery Check" is a song by the Swedish punk rock band Millencolin from the album Home from Home. It was released as a single on 3 July 2003 by Burning Heart Records in two versions: One with the album version of "Battery Check", sung in English, as the lead track, and the other with a Swedish language version entitled "E20 Norr" as the lead track. This version was named after E20 Norr, a northern part of the European route E20 which runs through the band's home town in Sweden. Both versions of the single include the alternate language version as the second track, and both also include the B-side song "Bowmore" from the album's recording sessions. An accompanying music video was also filmed and released in both languages, with the English version titled "Battery Check" and the Swedish version titled "E20 Norr". Both versions of the song and the music video are identical except for the language used.

== Track listing ==
1. "Battery Check"
2. "E20 Norr"
3. "Bowmore"
- "Battery Check" and "E20 Norr" are reversed on the "E20 Norr" version of the single.

== Personnel ==
=== Millencolin ===
- Nikola Šarčević - lead vocals, bass
- Erik Ohlsson - guitar
- Mathias Färm - guitar
- Fredrik Larzon - drums
