= Section 8 =

Section 8 or Section Eight may refer to:

== Arts and entertainment ==
- Section 8 (album), by MC Eiht, 1999
- Section 8 (comics), a fictional team of superheroes
- Section 8 (video game), 2009
  - Section 8: Prejudice, a 2011 sequel
- Section Eight (Artemis Fowl), a fictional element in Artemis Fowl and the Lost Colony
- Section 8 (record producer), record producer and songwriter
- Section Eight (film), a 2022 American action film starring Ryan Kwanten
- "Section 8", a song by Whitechapel from the album Whitechapel
- Section 8 (hardcore punk band), a Swedish hardcore punk band active at the end of the 20th century.

== Businesses and organisations ==
- Section 8 (NYSPHSAA), governing body for high school sports in Nassau County, New York, U.S.
- Section 8 Chicago, the independent supporter's association for the Chicago Fire Soccer Club
- Section 8 (music venue), a live music bar in Melbourne, Australia
- Section Eight Productions, a film production company

== Other uses ==
- Section 8 (housing), a U.S. government housing program
- Section 8 (military), a U.S. military form of discharge
- Section 8 notice, part of the U.K.'s Housing Act 1988
- Section 8 of the Canadian Charter of Rights and Freedoms
- Section 8 of the Constitution Act, 1867
- Section 8 of the Immigration Act 1969, in Trinidad and Tobago
- Section 8 of the Indian Penal Code, describing the usage of gender pronouns in the code

== See also ==
- Section.80, an album by Kendrick Lamar, 2011
