= No Straight Angles =

Studio album by No Fun at All
- Released: 1994
- Genre: Punk rock
- Label: Burning Heart

No Fun at All chronology
Vision (1993)	No Straight Angles (1994)	Out of Bounds (1995)

No Straight Angles is the first full-length album by punk rock band No Fun at All, released in 1994.

The album was rated 4 out of 5 stars by Punknews.org.

== Track listing ==
1. Believers
2. Wow and I Say Wow
3. Strong and Smart
4. Growing Old, Growing Cold
5. I Can't Believe It's True
6. It Won't Be Long
7. I Am Wrong and I Am Right
8. Wisdom?
9. So It Sadly Goes
10. Beachparty
11. Evil Worms
12. Days in the Sun
13. So Many Times
14. Nothing I Wouldn't Do
15. Happy for the First Time
16. Alcohol †
17. Don't Be a Pansy †

"Happy for the First Time" contains a hidden track a new version of their song "What You Say", which originally appeared on the 1993 EP Vision.

"Strong and Smart" was later covered by the Swedish metal band In Flames as a bonus track to their album Clayman.

"Alcohol" is originally a song composed by the hardcore band Gang Green.

† = Exclusive to the 1995 Theologian Records American release. "Don't Be a Pansy" was originally released on a 1994 G-Spot Records compilation CD named "Rock Around The Clock" and on the No Straight Angles Maxi single.
