= Broken World =

Broken World may refer to:

- "Broken World" (Millennium), an episode of the television series Millennium
- "Broken World" (song), a song by Millencolin
- Dungeon Siege II: Broken World, an expansion pack for the video game Dungeon Siege II
- The Broken World, a 2019 storyline in the horror comic Witch Creek Road season 2 storyline by Garth Matthams and Kenan Halilović
