= SOS (Millencolin album) =

Studio album by Millencolin
- Released: 15 February 2019
- Studio: Soundlab Studios; Fascination Street Studios
- Length: 35:08
- Label: Epitaph

Millencolin chronology
True Brew (2015)	SOS (2019)

Professional ratings
Review scores
Source	Rating
AllMusic	3.5/5 stars
The Skinny	3/5 stars

SOS is the ninth studio album by Swedish punk rock band Millencolin. It was released on 15 February 2019 by Epitaph Records.

== Background ==
The album was recorded at Millencolin's Soundlab Studios in Örebro, Sweden, and mixed by Jens Bogren at Fascination Street Studios.

== Track listing ==
SOS track listing
No.	Title	Length
1.	"SOS"	3:19
2.	"For Yesterday"	2:46
3.	"Nothing"	2:58
4.	"Sour Days"	3:07
5.	"Yanny & Laurel"	2:48
6.	"Reach You"	3:01
7.	"Do You Want War"	2:33
8.	"Trumpets & Poutine"	2:44
9.	"Let It Be"	2:34
10.	"Dramatic Planet"	3:19
11.	"Caveman's Land"	3:01
12.	"Carry On"	2:58

== Charts ==
Chart performance for SOS
Chart (2019)	Peak position
Australian Albums (ARIA)	32
Austrian Albums (Ö3 Austria)	22
Belgian Albums (Ultratop Flanders)	181
German Albums (Offizielle Top 100)	19
Swedish Albums (Sverigetopplistan)	15
Swiss Albums (Schweizer Hitparade)	21
UK Rock & Metal Albums (OCC)	26
