= Carry You =

Carry You may refer to:

- "Carry You" (Union J song), 2013
- "Carry You" (Missy Higgins song), 2020
- "Carry You", a song by the Fire Theft from their 2003 self-titled album
- "Carry You", a song by David Cook from Digital Vein
- "Carry You", a song by Millencolin from The Melancholy Connection
