= Kid Down =

- Origin: Åmål, Dalsland, Sweden
- Genres: Pop-punk; Emo pop
- Years active: 2002—2012
- Labels: Dead Frog Records (2003); Atenzia Records (2005); Burning Heart Records (2006–2008); Epitaph Records (2008); Panic & Action (2008-2012)
- Members: Eric Höjdén; Jens Anundson; Kristoffer Ljung; David Bergström

Kid Down is a Swedish pop punk band formed in Åmål in 2002. While the band hasn't officially announced that they've split up, they haven't been active since 2012.

== Biography ==
Kid Down was signed to Burning Heart Records and released their two first albums called The Noble Art Of Irony (2007), I Want My Girlfriend Rich (2008). In 2010 an album called Murphy's Law was released online by the band.

In 2007 the band won the Rockbjörnen Music Award (MySpace-Award).

The band toured through Europe with Fall Out Boy to promote their second album. The band won at the Swedish Metal Awards in Category Best Punk/Hardcore album.

In April 2009 Kid Down toured through Europe and played on Groezrock with Rise Against and Bullet for My Valentine. The band shared stage with Emery, MxPx.

The band currently exist out of Eric Höjdén (Vocals, Guitar), Jens Anundson (Guitar, Vocals), Kristoffer Ljung (Bass guitar, Vocals) and David Bergström (Drums). Höjdén is record producer at Dead End Studios and also co-founded Panic & Action, an indie record label and management together with Peter Ahlqvist. Höjden produced albums by Adept and Her Bright Skies.

Bergström went on to play drums with ior together with David Fridlund from David & The Citizens.

== Discography ==
=== Albums ===
- 2007: The Noble Art Of Irony (Burning Heart Records)
- 2008: I Want My Girlfriend Rich (Burning Heart Records)
- 2010: Murphy's Law (Self-released)

=== EPs ===
- 2003: We'll Make It Away (Dead Frog Records)
- 2005: Deadkidsongs (Atenzia Records)
- 2008: Red Lights (Download-EP; Epitaph Records)

=== Singles ===
- 2008: Red Lights (Burning Heart Records)
- 2008: I'll Do It (For You) (Burning Heart Records)
- 2012: Oh! You Are Such A Rebel! (Self-released)
