= The Big Knockover =

Studio album by No Fun at All
- Released: Europe: 13 July 1997 (Sweden); US: 17 February 1998
- Recorded: May 1997 at Underground in Västerås Västerås, Sweden
- Genre: Punk
- Length: 31:17
- Label: European Burning Heart Records; US Theologian Records
- Producer: Produced by Pelle Saether & NFAA. Co-produced by Lars Lindén MIXED BY: Pelle Saether & NFAA July 28–30, 1997 Masterd at the Cutting Room, Solna by Peter In De Betou.

No Fun at All chronology
Out of Bounds (1995)	The Big Knockover (1997)	State of Flow (2000)

Professional ratings
Review scores
Source	Rating
Kerrang!	1/5 stars

The Big Knockover is the Swedish punk group No Fun at All's third album, released on 13 July 1997.

All music by Mikael Danielsson except track 1, which was co-written by Jimmie Olsson. All lyrics by Ingemar Jansson. Published by Misty Music.

== Track listing ==
1. "Catch Me Running Round"
2. "Suicide Machine"
3. "Should Have Known"
4. "Lose Another Friend"
5. "When the Time Comes"
6. "Sorry Lad"
7. "Everything Inside"
8. "The Other Side"
9. "Away from the Circle"
10. "Nobody's Perfect"
11. "Your Feeble Mind"
12. "Ultramar"
13. "Break My Back"

The title, "The Big Knockover," is taken from a short story by Dashiell Hammett. This short story was also a source of inspiration for the film "The Usual Suspects."
