= Penguins & Polarbears =

2000 single by Millencolin

Single by Millencolin

from the album Pennybridge Pioneers
- B-side: "Queen's Gambit"; "Dinner Dog"
- Released: 24 January 2000
- Genre: Skate punk, pop punk
- Label: Burning Heart
- Songwriter(s): Mathias Färm, Fredrik Larzon, Erik Ohlsson, Nikola Šarčević

Millencolin singles chronology
"Twenty Two" (1997)	"Penguins & Polarbears" (2000)	"Fox" (2000)

"Penguins & Polarbears" is a song by the Swedish punk rock band Millencolin from the album Pennybridge Pioneers. It was released as a single on 24 January 2000 by Burning Heart Records, including two B-sides from the album's recording sessions, "Queen's Gambit" and "Dinner Dog". An accompanying music video for "Penguins & Polarbears" was also filmed and released on disc 2 for the CD release. In Triple J's Hottest 100 for 2000 the song was number 41.

== Track listing ==
CD single

1. "Penguins & Polarbears"
2. "Queens Gambit"
3. "Dinner Dog"

7" vinyl

- Side A:
1. "Penguins & Polarbears"
2. "Queens Gambit"
- Side B:
1. "Dinner Dog"
2. "An Elf and His Zippo"
