= Varicella (disambiguation) =

Varicella is another name for chickenpox, a disease caused by infection with varicella zoster.

Varicella may also refer to:

- Varicella vaccine, a vaccine that protects against chickenpox and shingles
- Varicella zoster virus, a virus that causes chickenpox and shingles
- Varicella (video game), a 1999 video game
- Varicella, a snail genus in the family Oleacinidae

== See also ==
- Chickenpox (disambiguation)
- Simian varicella virus
