= Vision (EP) =

EP by No Fun at All
- Released: 7 July 1993
- Recorded: Musikstugan FALUN.
- Genre: Punk rock
- Length: 17:06
- Label: Burning Heart Records
- Producer: No Fun At All

No Fun at All chronology
Touchdown (1992)	Vision (1993)	No Straight Angles (1994)

Vision is the first EP by Swedish melodic punk rock band No Fun at All, released on 7 July 1993. The EP's style is more hardcore than its follow-up No Straight Angles and other releases.

Originally, Vision was meant to be a 'hope-we-can-sell-all-of-them' release with an initial pressing of a thousand copies. The EP has since gone on to sell over 25,000 copies.

Ingemar Jansson, who would later join the band as vocalist, is credited with taking the photo of the band in the EP's booklet.

== Track listing ==
- All music & lyrics by Micke Danielsson except when noted otherwise.
1. "Where's the Truth?" – 2:11
2. "Vision" – 1:55
3. "It's All Up to You" – 2:00
4. "I Won't Believe in You" – 2:05
5. "Funny?" – 1:38
6. "Suffer Inside" – 2:07
7. "Sidewalk" – 2:09 (J.Olsson)
8. "I Won't Come Back" – 1:42
9. "What You Say" – 1:19

A slow rock rendition of the last track, "What You Say", appears as a hidden track on No Straight Angles.

== Personnel ==
- Jimmie 'Jimpa' Olsson - vocals, drums
- Mikael 'Micke' Danielsson - guitar, backing vocals
- Henrik 'Henka' Sunvisson - bass, backing vocals
