= The Story of My Life (Millencolin song) =

1995 Swedish single

Single by Millencolin

from the album Life on a Plate
- B-side: "9 to 5"; "Dragster"
- Released: 20 September 1995
- Genre: Ska punk, punk rock
- Label: Burning Heart

Millencolin singles chronology
"Da Strike" (1994)	"The Story of My Life" (1995)	"Move Your Car" (1996)

"The Story of My Life" is a song by Swedish punk rock band Millencolin from their second album, Life on a Plate, released as a single on 20 September 1995 by Burning Heart Records. The CD single also includes "9 to 5" and "Dragster", which are B-sides from the album's recording sessions. These two songs were re-released on the 1999 compilation album The Melancholy Collection. An accompanying music video for "The Story of My Life" was also filmed and released.

== Track listing ==
1. "The Story of My Life" - 2:32
2. "9 to 5" (originally performed by Dolly Parton) - 3:05
3. "Dragster" - 2:03

== Personnel ==
=== Millencolin ===
- Nikola Šarčević - lead vocals, bass
- Erik Ohlsson - guitar
- Mathias Färm - guitar
- Fredrik Larzon - drums

== Charts ==
=== Weekly charts ===
Chart (1995)	Peak position
Sweden (Sverigetopplistan)	10

=== Year-end charts ===
Chart (1995)	Position
Sweden (Sverigetopplistan)	98
