= Shake Me =

Shake Me may refer to:

- Shake Me!, album by Scottish band The Kaisers
- "Shake Me", song by Cinderella from Night Songs 1987
- "Shake Me", song by Millencolin from Da Strike EP
- "Shake Me", song by Bluesmobile 1989
- "Shake Me", song by Gitte Hænning 1977
- "Shake Me", song by Killer (Swiss band) 1981
- "Shake Me", song by Sheila and B. Devotion 1978
- "Shake Me", song by the Happy Fits from Lovesick (2025)
