= Roll Roll and Flee =

Studio album by Nikola Šarčević
- Released: 23 October 2006
- Label: Burning Heart Records

Nikola Šarčević chronology
Lock-Sport-Krock (2004)	Roll Roll and Flee (2006)	Nikola & Fattiglapparna (2010)

Professional ratings
Review scores
Source	Rating
Punknews.org	3.5/5 stars

Roll Roll and Flee is Nikola Šarčević's second solo album.

== Track listing ==
1. "From Where I´m Standing"
2. "Soul For Sale"
3. "Let Me In"
4. "Love Is Trouble"
5. "Tybble Skyline"
6. "Roll Roll And Flee"
7. "The Law Of John T."
8. "Horse Bay Blues"
9. "Thin Air"
10. "Married"
11. "Don't Kill The Flame"

== Lineup ==
- Nikola Šarčević: Lead and Backing Vocals, Acoustic and Electric guitar, Piano, Harmonica, Percussion
- Henrik Wind: Electric and Acoustic guitars, Bass, Pianos and Organs, Mandolin, Banjo, Percussion and Backing Vocals
- Fredrik Sandsten: Drums
- Kristofer Åström: Backing Vocals
- Branko Sarcevic: Acoustic guitar
- Kalle Gustafsson Jerneholm: Percussion, Accordion, Harp
- Mattias Hellberg: Harmonica
- Stefan Sporsén: Trumpet
- Håkan Svensson: Pedal Steel
- John Rönneklev: Percussion
