= Use Your Nose =

EP by Millencolin
- Released: 4 December 1993
- Recorded: 1–4 November 1993, Unisound Studios, Finspång, Sweden
- Genre: Punk rock
- Length: 14:57
- Label: Burning Heart
- Producer: Millencolin

Millencolin chronology
Melack (1993)	Use Your Nose (1993)	Skauch (1994)

Use Your Nose is an EP by Swedish punk rock band Millencolin, released on 4 December 1993 by Burning Heart Records. All of the songs from the EP were re-released on the 1999 compilation album The Melancholy Collection. The phrase "use your nose" refers to a skateboarding trick in which the rider slides with the nose, or front part, of the skateboard. A skateboarder using his nose to slide on a rail is illustrated on the cover of the album. The track "Use Your Nose" is a hidden track following "Nosepicker".

== Track listing ==
1. "In a Room" – 3:00
2. "Pain" – 2:24
3. "Shake Me" – 2:20
4. "Melack" – 2:16
5. "Nosepicker" – 3:38
6. "Use Your Nose" (hidden track) – 1:36

== Personnel ==
=== Millencolin ===
- Nikola Šarčević - lead vocals, bass
- Erik Ohlsson - guitar
- Mathias Färm - guitar
- Fredrik Larzon - drums
