= Out of Bounds (No Fun at All album) =

Studio album by No Fun at All
- Released: 10 October 1995
- Recorded: July 1995 at Studio Underground in Västerås, Sweden
- Genre: Punk rock
- Length: 36:19
- Label: Burning Heart Records
- Producer: Pelle Saether and NFAA

No Fun at All chronology
No Straight Angles (1994)	Out of Bounds (1995)	The Big Knockover (1997)

Out of Bounds is the second full-length album by Swedish melodic punk rock band No Fun at All, released on 10 October 1995.

This LP brought more of the skate punk style No Fun At All helped pioneer. It was well received by fans, but the band felt the album lacked an edge.

== Track listing ==
All music written by Mikael Danielsson. All lyrics written by Ingemar Jansson & Mikael Danielsson. Arrangements by No Fun At All.

1. "Beat 'em Down" – 2:28
2. "Master Celebrator" – 2:52
3. "Perfection" – 2:27
4. "In a Rhyme" - 2:16 †
5. "Pleasure is to be Insane" – 2:44 †
6. "Nothing Personal" – 2:22
7. "Don't Pass Me By" – 2:07 †
8. "I Have Seen" – 3:30
9. "Out of Bounds" – 2:38
10. "Talking to Remind Me" – 4:13
11. "In a Moment" – 2:07
12. "Trapped Inside" – 2:14
13. "Invitation" – 1:59
14. "Stranded" – 2:22

† = Backing vocals provided by departed and founding member of NFAA Jimmie Olsson.

== Lineup ==
- Kjell Ramstedt - drums
- Mikael Danielsson - rhythm guitar
- Ingemar Jansson - vocals
- Krister Johansson - lead guitar
- Henrik Sunvisson - bass
