= Nikola & Fattiglapparna =

Studio album by Nikola Šarčević
- Released: 2010
- Recorded: March 3, 2010
- Genre: Rock, folk rock, pop
- Label: Stalemate Music

Nikola Šarčević chronology
Roll Roll and Flee (2006)	Nikola & Fattiglapparna (2010)	Freedom to Roam

Nikola & Fattiglapparna is Nikola Šarčević's third solo album. Released in early 2010, it was recorded entirely in the Swedish language, and was his first on his Stalemate Music label. The album peaked at No. 34 on the Swedish Charts.

Many of the songs on the album are about Sarcevic's former home town, Örebro. It draws on a variety of genres including country pop, in contrast to Šarčević's work with punk rock band Millencolin.

== Track listing ==
1. Bocka Av
2. Mitt Örebro
3. Tro
4. Sämre Lögnare
5. Tappa Tempo
6. På Väg
7. Kommunicera
8. Det mesta talar nog för att vi kommer skiljas
9. Hemstad
10. Upp på Tybble Torg
11. Utan Dig

== Lineup ==
- Nikola Šarčević: Vocals, Guitars and Harmonica
- Henrik Wind: Electric and Acoustic guitars, Lapsteel, Bass, Banjo, Pianos, Organs, Cembalo, Vibraphone, Harmonica and Backing Vocals
- Richard Harrysson: Drums and Percussion
- Fredrik Landh: Backing Vocals
- Clas Olofsson: Acoustic guitars and Lapsteel
- Peter Nygren: Piano
- Martin Landh: Accordion and Flugelhorn
- Niklas Bäcklund: Flute
