= Shadows Chasing Ghosts =

British post-hardcore band

Shadows chasing Ghosts
- Origin: Essex, England
- Genres: Post-Hardcore, Metalcore
- Years active: 2007-2013
- Label: Small Town Records
- Past members: Trey Tremain; Matt Jones; Danny Coy; Danny Green; Chris Broadhurst; Damian Cummins; Jack Mackrill
- Website: shadowschasingghosts.co.uk

Shadows chasing Ghosts was a British post-hardcore band from Essex, England.

The band was formed in 2007 with Trey Tremain, Matt Jones, Danny Coy, Danny Green, and other guitarists to follow. Shadows chasing Ghosts got signed to Small Town Records, where they produced two albums and four singles.

Shadows chasing Ghosts played some shows in Germany together with While she sleeps at Matrix Bochum and Jugendhaus in Stuttgart. They played at Moshpit Open Air in Sweden with Enter Shikari, Young Guns, Yashin, and Deaf Havana, and at Butserfest with Fei Comodo, Bury Tomorrow, and We are the Ocean. and again in 2012 with Feed the Rhino, Heart in Hand, former 'Resistour' tour-support Polar and The Elijah.

In February and March 2012, they played as support for Eyes set to Kill through the United Kingdom. Together with German trancecore band We butter the Bread with Butter, Shadows chasing Ghosts toured as support on the We created a Monster tour from Yashin which lead through the whole UK.

The debut-album The golden Ratio was released on 2 August 2010 and their following album called Lessons was distributed on 2 July 2012. On 17 March 2013, ScG embarked on the 'Shout out loud Tour' heading all the UK (a European leg was planned but was canceled) together with Urma Sellinger and Hildamay as support.

On 9 May 2013, ScG called it quits and announced a farewell tour on 17 May with Palm Reader and Now, Voyager as support.

== Members ==
=== Final lineup ===
- Trey Tremain – vocals (2007–2013)
- Danny Green – bass (2007–2013)
- Chris Broadhurst – guitar (2012–2013)
- Matt Jones – guitar (2007–2013)
- Danny Coy – drums (2007–2013)

=== Former members ===
- Damian Cummins – guitar (2007–2011)
- Jack "Mackie" Mackrill (2011–2012)

== Discography ==
=== Albums ===
- 2010: The Golden Ratio
- 2012: Lessons
- 2019: The Singles

=== EPs ===
- 2008: Never Get a Wolf's Attention by Pulling its Tail

=== Singles ===
- 2009: "Searchlights"
- 2010: "Home"
- 2010: "Sunlight"
- 2011: "Resist"
- 2012: "Lose the Attitude"
- 2012: "The Hunter"
- 2013: "Splinter"
