= For Monkeys =

Studio album by Millencolin
- Released: ^{SWD} - 20 April 1997^{NA} - 20 May 1997
- Recorded: January 1997 at Unisound in Örebro, Sweden
- Genre: Ska punk, punk rock, melodic hardcore, Skate punk
- Length: 30:26
- Label: Burning Heart, Epitaph
- Producer: Millencolin

Millencolin chronology
Life on a Plate (1996)	For Monkeys (1997)	The Melancholy Collection (1999)

Singles from For Monkeys
- 1. "Lozin' Must" Released: April 1997; 2. "Twenty Two" Released: April 1997

Professional ratings
Review scores
Source	Rating
AllMusic	3/5 stars

For Monkeys is the third studio album by Swedish punk rock band Millencolin, released in April 1997 in Sweden by Burning Heart Records and in May 1997 in the United States by Epitaph Records. "Lozin' Must" was released as the album's single, with an accompanying music video. The recordings for the album were engineered by Dan Swanö, who is more well known for his involvement with bands belonging to the Death and Black Metal genres.

== Track listing ==
All songs written by Nikola Šarčević, except where noted.

No.	Title	Length
1.	"Puzzle"	2:38
2.	"Lozin' Must"	2:12
3.	"Random I Am"	2:40
4.	"Boring Planet"	2:06
5.	"Monkey Boogie"	2:26
6.	"Twenty Two"	2:55
7.	"Black Gold"	2:30
8.	"Trendy Winds" (Mathias Färm)	2:45
9.	"Otis"	2:51
10.	"Light's Out" (Färm)	2:30
11.	"Entrance at Rudebrook"	2:14
12.	"Lowlife" (Färm)	2:39

=== Japanese edition bonus tracks ===
1. "An Elf and His Zippo"
2. "Israelites"
3. "Vixen"

=== Brazilian edition bonus tracks ===
1. "Puzzle" (live)

== Personnel ==
=== Millencolin ===
- Nikola Šarčević - lead vocals, bass
- Erik Ohlsson - guitar
- Mathias Färm - guitar
- Fredrik Larzon - drums
