= Life on a Plate =

Studio album by Millencolin
- Released: ^{SWD} - 11 October 1995^{NA} - 26 March 1996
- Recorded: August 1995 at Unisound in Örebro, Sweden
- Genre: Pop punk
- Length: 32:06
- Label: Burning Heart, Epitaph
- Producer: Millencolin

Millencolin chronology
| Same Old Tunes (1994) | Life on a Plate (1995) | For Monkeys (1997) |

Singles from Life on a Plate
- 1. "The Story of My Life" Released: 20 September 1995; 2. "Move Your Car" Released: 26 October 1996

Life on a Plate is the second album by the Swedish punk rock band Millencolin, released on 11 October 1995 by Burning Heart Records. It reached No. 4 on the Swedish music charts upon its release and was certified gold in sales in 2002 after selling over 50,000 copies in Sweden. Swedish magazine Slitz also named its cover art, created by band member Erik Ohlsson, as the "Album Cover of the Year" for 1995. Life on a Plate was re-released in the United States the following year by Epitaph Records on 26 March 1996.

== Reception ==
Professional ratings
Review scores
| Source | Rating |
|---|---|
| AllMusic | 4/5 stars |

NME listed the album as one of "20 Pop Punk Albums Which Will Make You Nostalgic".

== Track listing ==
All songs written by Nikola Šarčević except where noted.

| No. | Title | Length |
|---|---|---|
| 1. | "Bullion" | 1:59 |
| 2. | "Olympic" (Kristofer Åström) | 2:56 |
| 3. | "Move Your Car" (Mathias Färm) | 2:06 |
| 4. | "Killercrush" | 2:27 |
| 5. | "Friends 'Til the End" | 2:31 |
| 6. | "The Story of My Life" | 2:32 |
| 7. | "Jellygoose" | 2:34 |
| 8. | "Replay" | 2:16 |
| 9. | "Vulcan Ears" | 2:05 |
| 10. | "Dr. Jackal & Mr. Hide" | 2:24 |
| 11. | "Softworld" | 2:56 |
| 12. | "Buzzer" (Mathias Färm) | 2:21 |
| 13. | "Ace Frehley" | 0:05 |
| 14. | "Airhead" (Mathias Färm) | 2:54 |

== Personnel ==
=== Millencolin ===
- Nikola Šarčević - lead vocals, bass
- Erik Ohlsson - guitar
- Mathias Färm - guitar
- Fredrik Larzon - drums

=== Others ===
- Fredrik Folcke - saxophone
- Markus Lowegren - trombone
