= Live Laugh Love (EP) =

EP by Urma Sellinger
- Released: 2010
- Recorded: Lunatic Music, Bro Studios
- Genre: Post-hardcore; metalcore
- Length: 12:53
- Label: Auto-Production
- Producer: Urma Sellinger; Matt Hyde

Urma Sellinger chronology
Live Laugh Love (2010)	Urma Sellinger (2012)

Live Laugh Love is the debut EP released by Stockholm-based post-hardcore band Urma Sellinger in 2010. The EP was recorded in 2010 together with Matt Hyde at Bro Studio in London, England and Lunatic Music in Gävle, Sweden.

Live Laugh Love features three tracks titled "Good Times", "Far from Sandra" and "Rise to the Challenges That Life Presents You". The last two songs are also included on the band's self-titled debut album Urma Sellinger, which was released on January 26, 2012.

== Track listing ==
All lyrics are written by Urma Sellinger

No.	Title	Length
1.	"Far from Sandra"	3:55
2.	"Good Times"	4:19
3.	"Rise to the Challenges that Life Presents You"	4:39
Total length:		12:53

== Credits ==
Urma Sellinger

- Olle Johansson – vocals
- Alex Borg – vocals
- Eric Lindqvist – guitar
- Andree Borg – guitar
- John Eriksson – drums
- Axel Vålvik – bass guitar

Production

- Matt Hyde – producing, mixing, engineering
