= The Accidents =

Swedish band

- Origin: Örebro, Sweden
- Genres: Punk, Rockabilly, Hardcore,
- Years active: 2002–present
- Labels: Burning Heart, Epitaph, Bootleg Booze Records
- Members: Rickard Alriksson; Fred Tank; Dan Wall
- Website: Homepage

The Accidents is a Swedish Punk-band, that formed in 2002. The band has released 3 fullength albums, several eps and singles on different labels, one of them is Burning Heart Records. The band has toured around Sweden, Europe and USA

== Members ==
- Rickard Alriksson
- Fred Tank
- Dan Wall

=== Past members ===
- Kim Belly
- Jallo Lehto
- Omega

== Discography ==
=== Album ===
- 2004 - All Time High (CD/LP, Bootleg Booze Records/Rock Alliance)
- 2005 - Poison Chalice (CD/LP, Bootleg Booze Records/Burning Heart Records)
- 2007 - Summer Dreams (CD, Burning Heart Records)

=== EP ===
- 2002 - Debut EP (7", Devils Shitburner Records)
- 2002 - The Accidents (EP)|The Accidents (10", Diapazam Records)
- 2009 - Stigamata Rock'n'Rolli (10", Bootleg Booze Records)
- 2009 - The Beechcraft Bonanza + Frutti Di Bosco (CD, Nicotine Records)

=== Single ===
- 2004 - Dead Guys (7", Bootleg Booze Records)
- 2004 - Performing Three Spectacular Hits (7", Idle Hands Records)
- 2004 - Dannelly Field Airport (7", Incognito Records)
- 2004 - Cisse (7", Bridge of Compassion Records)
- 2005 - Let's Go Out Tonight (7", Broken Hope Records)
- 2007 - Hot Hot City (7", Zorch Productions)
- 2009 - Frutti Di Bosco (7", Tornado Ride Records)
