= Urma Sellinger (album) =

Studio album by Urma Sellinger
- Released: January 26, 2012
- Recorded: Lunatic Music, Bro Studios
- Genres: Post-hardcore, metalcore
- Length: 42:36
- Label: Auto-Production
- Producers: Urma Sellinger, Matt Hyde

Urma Sellinger chronology
Live Laugh Love (2010)	Urma Sellinger (2012)

Singles from Urma Sellinger
- 1. "For Those We've Lost" Released: December 8, 2011

Professional ratings
Review scores
Source	Rating
Rocknytt	link (Swedish)

Urma Sellinger is the debut full-length album of Swedish Post-hardcore band Urma Sellinger. The album was produced by British recording producer Matt Hyde at Lunatic Music in Gävle, Sweden and at Bro Studios in London, United Kingdom. Urma Sellinger announced in February 2011 that Hyde will be working with the band again after working on the EP "Live Laugh Love."

== History ==
While in production, bass player Axel Vålvik departed from the band for personal reasons.

In August 2011 Urma Sellinger published "Plastic Smile", a song from the album, at Facebook and MySpace. On December 8, 2011, the band released the single "For Those We've Lost" as a digital download on iTunes, Spotify and Amazon. The song aired at Bandit Rock as a pre-listen song on November 22, 2011. Some songs are aired on Australian online radio podcast The Pit FM.

Urma Sellinger was finally released on January 26, 2012, as physical copy and as a download. The album's track list consists of 11 tracks including "Far from Sandra" and "Rise to the Challenges" from the high-acclaimed EP "Live Laugh Love". The cover artwork was designed by Joensuu based Century Designs.

== Track list ==
All lyrics are written by Urma Sellinger.

No.	Title	Length
1.	"Overhang"	3:58
2.	"For Those We've Lost"	4:12
3.	"Plastic Smile"	3:23
4.	"Hide & Seek"	3:31
5.	"Far from Sandra"	3:52
6.	"Nothing But a Lie"	4:06
7.	"Have You Seen Yourself Lately?"	3:23
8.	"No Escape"	3:28
9.	"Every Second, Every Day"	3:34
10.	"Rise to the Challenges"	4:25
11.	"Divided We Stand"	4:44
Total length:		42:36

== Credits ==
Urma Sellinger

- Olle Johansson – vocalist
- Alex Borg – vocalist
- Eric Lindqvist – guitarist
- Andree Borg – GUITARist
- John Eriksson – drummer
- Axel Vålvik – bassist (till the end of May 2011)

Production

- Matt Hyde (producing, mixing, engineering)
- Cover Artwork by Century Designs
