= No Fun at All =

Swedish band

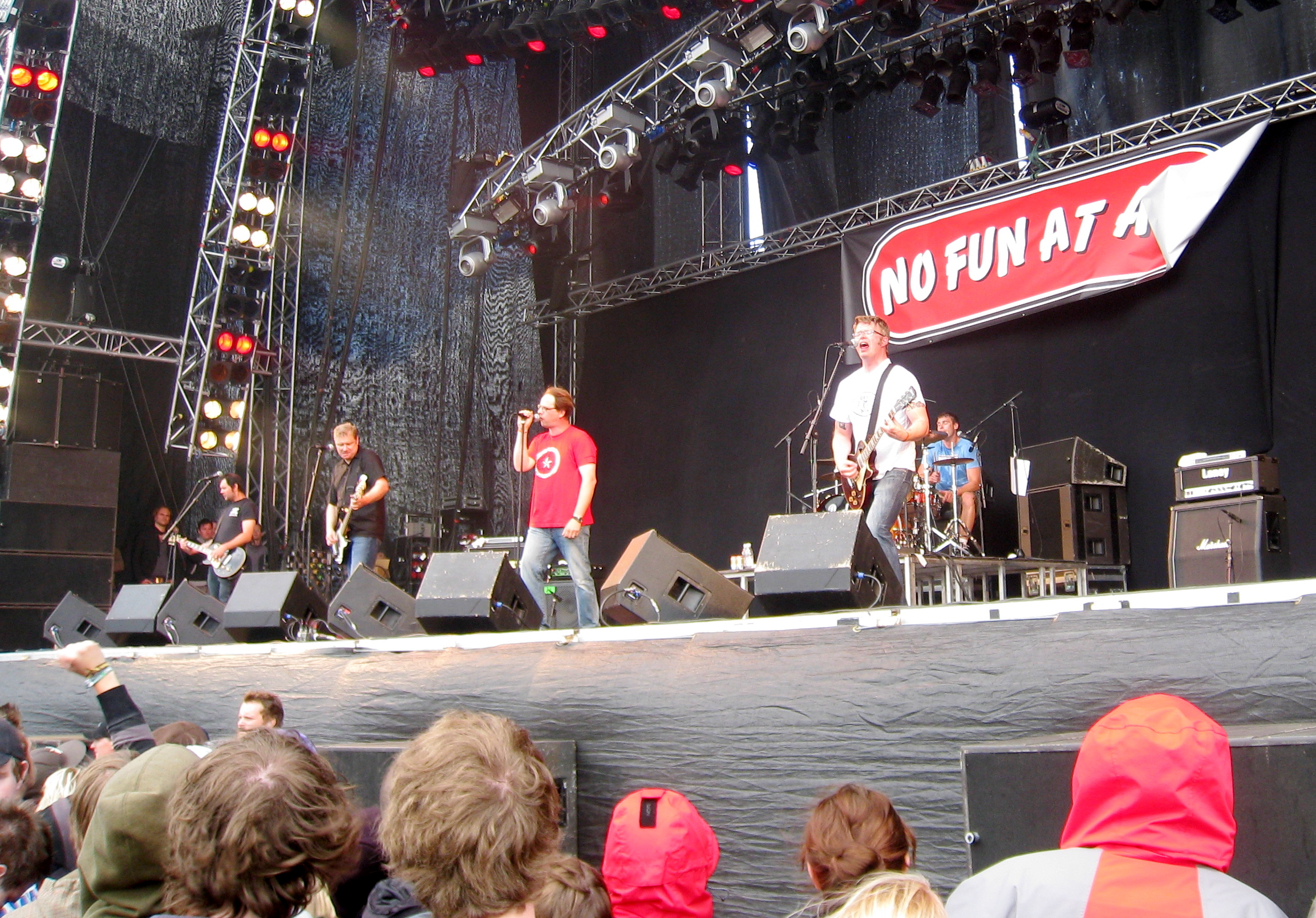

Background information
- Also known as: NFAA
- Origin: Skinnskatteberg, Sweden
- Genres: Punk rock, melodic hardcore
- Years active: 1991–2001; 2004–2012; 2013-present
- Labels: Beat 'Em Down; Burning Heart; Epitaph; Theologian; Revelation
- Members: Ingemar Jansson; Fredrik Eriksson; Stefan Bratt; Kjell Ramstedt; Christer Mähl
- Past members: Mikael Danielsson; Jimmie Olsson; Henrik Sunvisson; Stefan Neuman; Max Hudden

No Fun at All (often abbreviated to just NFAA) is a Swedish punk rock band.

== History ==
The band formed in the summer of 1991 in Skinnskatteberg. The group initially consisted of Mikael Danielsson (guitar), Jimmie Olsson (vocals, drums) and Henrik Sunvisson (bass guitar). The name was inspired by a tongue-in-cheek version of The Stooges' song "No Fun" as covered by the Sex Pistols, and the name of the band Sick of It All. The group released their albums on the Swedish label Burning Heart Records outside the United States. Within the U.S., No Fun at All's albums were released by Theologian Records with the exception of Out Of Bounds which was released by Revelation Records. Epitaph Records released a compilation album known as Master Celebrations in the US in 2002, making it their only release directly on Epitaph despite Burning Heart's close association with them.

In 1993, Jimmie Olsson left the band to concentrate on his other band Sober. He has contributed on all subsequent albums (except Out of Bounds) providing backup vocals. No Fun at All then recruited three new members: Ingemar Jansson (vocals), Krister Johansson (guitar) and Kjell Ramstedt (drums). In 1999, Sunvisson quit, Danielsson switched from guitar to bass guitar and Stefan Neuman, from Tribulation, took up the vacant guitar slot. On January 11, 2001, No Fun at All broke up, and played their farewell show later in month.

Since 2004, the band has reunited for several reunion shows. Preceded by a stream of "Never Ending Stream" in October 2008 and the single "Reckless (I Don't Wanna)" on November 1, 2008, they released Low Rider that same month through their own label Beat 'Em Down Records. On April 19, 2012 the Millencolin Festival announced that No Fun At All canceled their show at the festival due to their disbandment . As of May 2013, however, the band became active again and toured Australia in November of that year with Boysetsfire, Off with Their Heads and Jughead's Revenge. They have since toured Australia multiple times, including 2020 (with Pennywise and Strung Out), and October/November 2022 in support of their latest album, "Seventh Wave". After a Latin America Tour in 2023, founding guitar player Danielsson quit, he was replaced by Max Hudden. In 2025 Hudden was replaced by returning long time member Christer Mähl.

== Band members ==
Timeline

== Discography ==
=== Studio albums ===
- No Straight Angles (1994)
- Out of Bounds (1995)
- The Big Knockover (1997)
- State of Flow (2000)
- Low Rider (2008)
- Grit (2018)
- Seventh Wave (2022)

=== EP's ===
- Vision (1993) EP
- In a Rhyme (1994) EP
- There is a Reason to Believe in Miracles (1995) Split EP
- Stranded (1995) EP
- And Now for Something Completely Different (1997) EP
- Live in Tokyo (1999) Live EP

=== Other releases ===
- Touchdown (1992) Demo
- Throw It In (1997) Compilation (Released only in Australia)
- EP's Going Steady (1998) Compilation
- NFAA (2000) Promo
- Master Celebrations (2002) Compilation

=== Singles ===
- Beachparty
- In a Rhyme
- Stranded
- Master Celebrator
- Should Have Known
- Second Best
- Reckless (I Don't Wanna)
