= Matt Hyde (British producer) =

British record producer

- Born: Matthew Paul Hyde
- Genres: Heavy metal, rock, punk
- Occupations: Record producer, mixing engineer
- Years active: 2000–present
- Website: matthyde.co.uk

Matthew Paul Hyde is a British record producer and mixing engineer. His studio is based in London. Hyde has worked with Gallows, Funeral for a Friend, Bullet for My Valentine, Trivium, Machine Head, As I Lay Dying, Chimaira, Ash, Razorlight, and Dååth. In 2008, he provided mix engineering with Colin Richardson on Slipknot's Grammy Award-nominated albums All Hope Is Gone and 9.0: Live. His work on Urma Sellinger's debut album was released on 26 January 2012.

== Discography ==
Artist	Albums	Productions	Record label
As I Lay Dying	An Ocean Between Us	Mixing, engineer	Metal Blade Records
Gallows	Abandon Ship	Mixing	Warner Music
Bullet for My Valentine	Scream Aim Fire	Recording, mixing	Sony Music
Machine Head	The Blackening	Mixing, engineer	Roadrunner Records
Dååth	The Hinderers	Engineer, mixing	Roadrunner Records
Trivium	The Crusade	Engineer, mixing	Roadrunner Records
Bullet for My Valentine	Tears Don't Fall (single)	Engineer	Sony BMG
Slipknot	9.0: Live	Mixing, engineer, co-producer	Roadrunner Records
Slipknot	All Hope Is Gone	Co-producer	Roadrunner Records
Chimaira	Chimaira	Engineer, mixing	Roadrunner Records
Ash	Meltdown Live	Engineer, mixing	Mushroom Records
Funeral for a Friend	Casually Dressed & Deep in Conversation	Engineer	East West Records
Urma Sellinger	Live Laugh Love	Producer, engineer, mixing	Lunatic Music, Auto-production
Urma Sellinger	Urma Sellinger	Producer, engineer, mixing	Auto-production
The Glitterati	Are You One of Us?	Producer, recording, mixing	DR2
Rodrigo y Gabriela	11:11	Mixing	Ruby Works
Kreator	Hordes of Chaos	Mixing	SPV
Trivium	Shogun	Mixing	Roadrunner
Brutai	Born	Mixing, producer	Transcend
STR8	The Sun (single)	Engineer, mixing	Revalve Records
STR8	Wrong (single)	Engineer, mixing	Revalve Records
STR8	Last Goodbye (single)	Engineer, mixing	Revalve Records / Believe
