= Liberator (band) =

Swedish ska band

Liberator is a ska band originating from the city of Malmö in the Scania region in the south of Sweden. They started in 1994 and released their most recent album in 2009. Currently they are signed to Burning Heart Records.

== Discography ==
=== Albums ===
- This Is Liberator (1996, Burning Heart)
- Worldwide Delivery (1998, Burning Heart; 2000 Epitaph (US release))
- Too Much of Everything (2000, Burning Heart)
- Soundchecks 95-00 (2001, Burning Heart)
- Are You Liberated? (2003)
- Stand and Deliver (2009)

=== Singles and EPs ===
- Freedom Fighters EP (1996, Burning Heart)
- "Tell Me Tell Me" (1996, Burning Heart)
- Carefully Blended EP (1997, Burning Heart)
- "Kick the Bucket" (1998, Burning Heart; 1998 Heartcore (US release))
- "Christina" (1998, Burning Heart)
- "Everybody Wants It All" (2000, Burning Heart)
- "Ring the Alarm" (2008, Bale Records Inc.)

=== Lineup ===
Robert Ylipää Johan Holmberg Rodrigo López Per Hedberg Erik Wesser Daniel Mattisson Peter Andersson Andreas Sjögren

== Sources ==
- Liberator at AllMusic
- Band bio @ Burning Heart
