= Freedom to Roam =

Studio album by Nikola Šarčević
- Released: March 20, 2013
- Genre: Rock, folk rock, pop
- Label: Stalemate Music

Nikola Šarčević chronology
Nikola & Fattiglapparna (2010)	Freedom to Roam (2013)

Freedom to Roam is Nikola Šarčević's fourth solo album, released in March 2013. The album was recorded entirely in English, as opposed to his previous solo album Nikola & Fattiglapparna, which was made up of all-Swedish lyrics.

On March 17, 2013, the first single and video clip for "Ophelia" was released.

The album is also set to be released on limited edition red or black vinyl. The release has since been delayed.

== Track listing ==
1. Ophelia
2. Drunk no more
3. Loved you before
4. Into the arms of a stranger
5. In love with a fool
6. Here and now
7. Free man
8. Still loving you
9. Which way to go
10. The Final Chapter
