= Kemp (song) =

Single by Millencolin

from the album Home from Home
- B-side: "The Downhill Walk"; "Absolute Zero"
- Released: 18 February 2002
- Genre: Punk rock
- Label: Burning Heart
- Songwriters: Mathias Färm, Fredrik Larzon, Erik Ohlsson, Nikola Šarčević

Millencolin singles chronology
"Fox" (2000)	"Kemp" (2002)	"Man or Mouse" (2002)

"Kemp" is a song by the Swedish punk rock band Millencolin from the album Home from Home. It was released as a single on 18 February 2002, by Burning Heart Records, including two B-sides from the album's recording sessions, "The Downhill Walk" and "Absolute Zero". An accompanying music video for "Kemp" was also filmed and released.

"Kemp" originated as a B-side from the band's previous album Pennybridge Pioneers. This version had been released on their previous single "Fox" in 2000, and the song was rewritten with new lyrics for Home from Home.

== Track listing ==
CD single

1. "Kemp"
2. "The Downhill Walk"
3. "Absolute Zero"

7" vinyl

- Side A:
1. "Kemp"
- Side B:
1. "The Downhill Walk"
2. "Absolute Zero"

== Personnel ==
=== Millencolin ===
- Nikola Šarčević – lead vocals, bass
- Erik Ohlsson – guitar
- Mathias Färm – guitar
- Fredrik Larzon – drums

== Charts ==
Chart performance for "Kemp"
Chart (2002)	Peak position
Australia (ARIA)	69
Sweden (Sverigetopplistan)	60
