= Her Bright Skies =

Swedish band

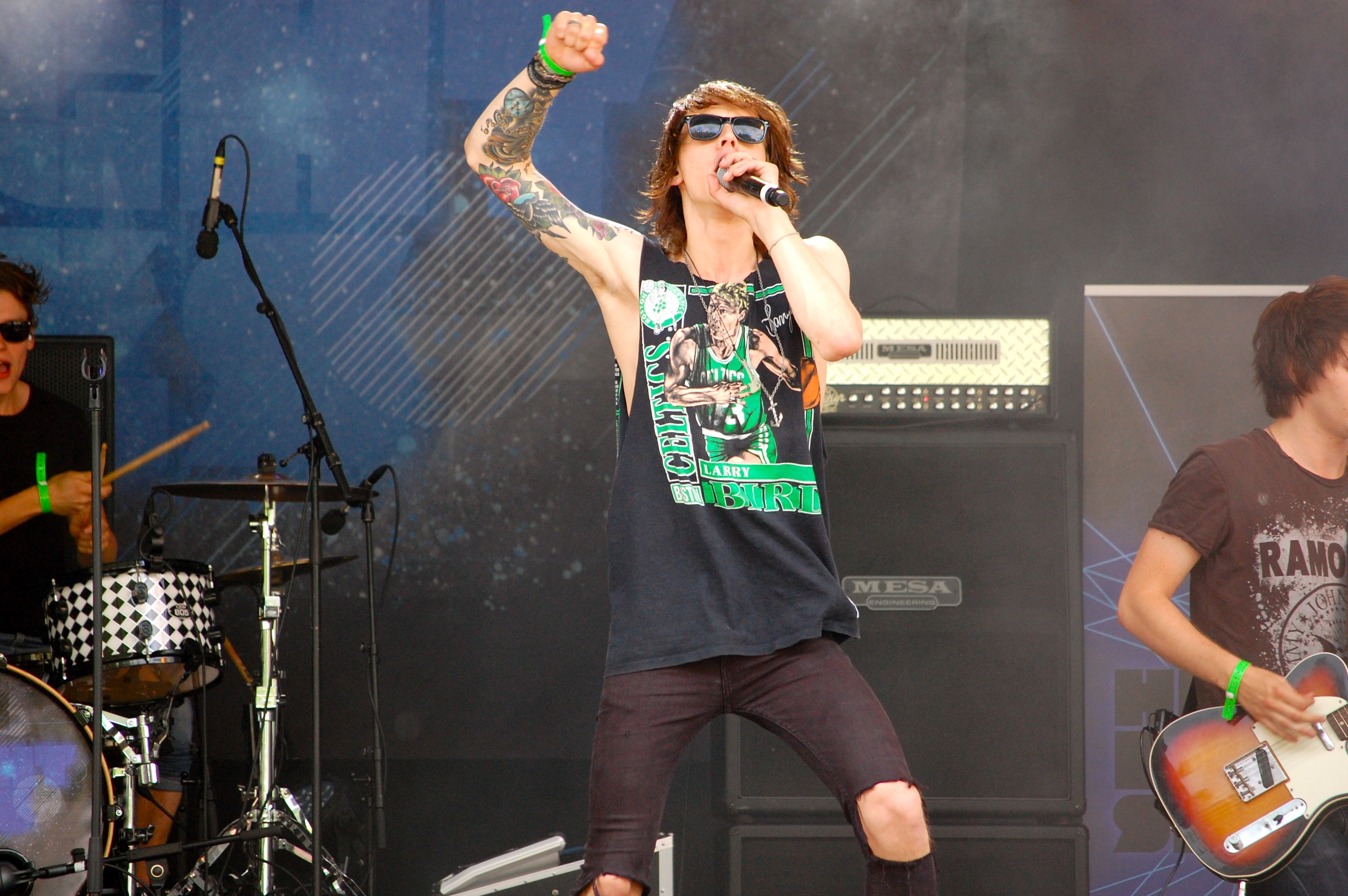

Background information
- Origin: Jönköping, Sweden
- Genres: Pop punk, post-hardcore (early)
- Years active: 2005–2016, 2020–present
- Labels: Burning Heart
- Members: Niclas Sjöstedt; Petter Nilsson
- Past members: Albin Blomqvist; Jonas Gudmundsson; Joakim Karlsson
- Website: www.herbrightskies.com

Her Bright Skies is a Swedish pop punk band based in Jönköping.

== History ==
HBS consists of Johan "Jaybee" Brolin (vocals), Niclas "Nikki" Sjostedt (guitar), Petter "Pete" Nilsson (guitar, vocals), Jonas Guddmunson (drums), and Joakim "Jolly" Karlsson (bass guitar, vocals). The first CD was released in 2007 and is called Beside Quiet Waters. The EP was produced on their own.

Just one year later their debut full-length album called A Sacrament; Ill City followed. The album was produced at District 19 Records. Their second full-length CD is called Causing a Scene and was produced at Swedish Independent record label Panic & Action. Causing a Scene was released in 2010. The same year HBS played at Pier Pressure Festival together with Thirty Seconds to Mars, HIM, Pendulum and Paramore. The Used cancelled their gig at Pier Pressure. The band shared stage with Swedish Metalcore band and label mates Adept through Germany and with Bring Me the Horizon through Scandinavia.

HBS co-headlined Panic & Action Tour with Kid Down through Sweden. The band played concerts in Germany, Norway, Austria and the Netherlands.

In June 2011 HBS shared stage at Siesta Festivalen together with Asking Alexandria, ...And You Will Know Us by the Trail of Dead, August Burns Red, Adept, Bullet and many other bands.

They finished their second tour in the United States, and released their third album Rivals.

The band broke up in 2016 and played their last concert on March 26. However, they returned four years later as a quartet and with a new single, "Bored", released on March 20, 2020.

== Discography ==
=== EPs ===
- 2006: Her Bright Skies
- 2007: Beside Quiet Waters
- 2012: DJ Got Us Falling in Love (Panic & Action, half acoustic EP)
- 2015: Prodigal Son

=== Albums ===
- 2008: A Sacrament; Ill City (District 19)
- 2010: Causing A Scene (Panic & Action)
- 2012: Rivals (Panic & Action)

=== Singles ===
- 2010: "Little Miss Obvious" (Panic & Action)
- 2011: "Ghosts Of the Attic" (Panic & Action)
- 2012: "Lovekills" (Panic & Action)
- 2014: "Bonnie & Clyde" (Panic & Action)
- 2020: "Bored"

=== Music videos ===
- 2006: Synapse Year
- 2008: Burn All the Small Towns
- 2010: Sing It!
- 2010: Little Miss Obvious
- 2011: Ghosts of the Attic
- 2012: DJ Got Us Fallin' In Love (Usher Cover)
- 2012: Lovekills
- 2013: Rivals
- 2014: Bonnie & Clyde (The Revolution)
- 2014: Hurt (NIN cover)
- 2020: Bored
