= Master Celebrations =

Compilation album by No Fun at All
- Released: 11 November 2002
- Genre: Punk

Master Celebrations is the "best of" compilation album from No Fun at All, released on 11 November 2002.

It was rated 4.5 stars by AllMusic.

== Track listing ==
1. "Master Celebrator"
2. "Suicide Machine"
3. "Strong and Smart"
4. "Out of Bounds"
5. "I Won't Believe in You"
6. "Wow and I Say Wow"
7. "Celestial Q&A"
8. "In a Rhyme"
9. "Stranded"
10. "Beachparty"
11. "Should Have Known"
12. "Lose Another Friend"
13. "Where's the Truth?"
14. "Believers"
15. "My Extraordinary Mind"
16. "Beat 'Em Down"
17. "Vision"
18. "Talking to Remind Me"
19. "Catch Me Running Round"
20. "Growing Old, Growing Cold"
21. "Second Best"
22. "Aftermath"
23. "Lovely Ordeal"
24. "Alcohol"
