= Chickenpox (disambiguation) =

Chickenpox is a highly contagious illness caused by primary infection with varicella zoster virus.

Chickenpox may also refer to:

- "Chickenpox" (South Park), an episode of the American television series South Park
- Chickenpox (band), a Swedish ska band
- "Chicken Pox", a song from the album Melting Pot by Booker T. & the MGs
- "Chicken Pox", a song from the album Let Me Introduce My Friends by the band I'm From Barcelona
