= Section 8 (hardcore punk band) =

Section 8 was a Swedish hardcore band, formed in the summer of 1995 in Skänninge. After a month of rehearsals, the band went on to do their first live show.

The band was influenced by groups such as Minor Threat, Gorilla Biscuits, Chain of Strength, Battery or Youth of Today. On at least one occasion, the band played an entire show of only Minor Threat covers.

The band only released two EPs and a single album, Make Ends Meet, on Burning Heart Records in 2000

They disbanded in 2001 or so.

== Discography ==
=== Album ===
- 2000 - Make Ends Meet

=== EP ===
- 1998 - Throw a Spanner Into the Works
- 1999 - Section 8
