= Panic & Action =

Swedish record label

- Founded: 2008
- Defunct: 2014
- Genre: Metalcore, punk rock, deathcore, post-hardcore, emo
- Country of origin: Sweden
- Location: Åmål (Headquarter), Örebro
- Official website: www.panicandaction.com

Panic & Action was a Swedish record label based in Åmål and Örebro, being active between 2008-2014, the label focused mainly on different subgenres of rock and heavy music.

== History ==
Panic & Action was founded in 2008 by Kid Down vocalist Eric Höjdén and Peter Ahlqvist (founder of Burning Heart Records). Most famous bands who were signed to the label was Her Bright Skies, Adept and Chemical Vocation. Other musicians who was signed to Panic & Action was Social Siberia (solo-project of Chemical Vocation guitarist Joakim Jensen), Walking with Strangers (Deathcore) and The Shiloh.

Panic & Action recordings was distributed worldwide. They organized a Sampler called Burn All the Small Towns featuring all signed bands and Kid Down and the Panic & Action Tour.

On October 30, 2014, the label announced its closure. Instead, Burning Heart Records was reactivated and the label's artists was transferred to the new label.

== Bands ==
=== Previously signed ===
- Her Bright Skies (post-hardcore)
- Walking With Strangers (Progressive metalcore)
- Chemical Vocation (Punk rock)
- The Shiloh (Punk rock)
- Joakim Jensen (Social Siberia) (Acoustic rock)
- Aim For The Sunrise (Metalcore)
- Adept (Metalcore, post-hardcore)
