= The Melancholy Collection =

Compilation album by Millencolin
- Released: ^{SWD} - 29 July 1999^{NA} - 23 October 2001
- Genre: Ska punk, punk rock, melodic hardcore
- Length: 50:46
- Label: Burning Heart, Epitaph
- Producer: Millencolin

Millencolin chronology
For Monkeys (1997)	The Melancholy Collection (1999)	Pennybridge Pioneers (2000)

The Melancholy Collection is a compilation album by Swedish punk rock band Millencolin, released on 29 July 1999 by Burning Heart Records. The album combines the band's first two EPs, B-sides from their singles, and other rare and unreleased tracks. The Melancholy Collection was re-released in the United States by Epitaph Records on 23 October 2001.

== Track listing ==
Track	Song	Recorded	Appeared on	Notes
01	"In a Room"	1993	Use Your Nose (EP)	-
02	"Pain"	1993	Use Your Nose (EP)	-
03	"Shake Me"	1993	Use Your Nose (EP)	-
04	"Melack"	1993	Use Your Nose (EP)	-
05	"Nosepicker"	1993	Use Your Nose (EP)	-
06	"Use Your Nose"	1993	Use Your Nose (EP)	-
07	"Flippin' Beans"	1994	Teaching You No Fear (compilation)	-
08	"Yellow Dog"	1994	Skauch (EP)	-
09	"Knowledge"	1994	Skauch (EP)	Originally performed by Operation Ivy
10	"A Whole Lot Less"	1994	Skauch (EP)	Originally performed by Sub Society
11	"Coolidge"	1994	Skauch (EP)	Originally performed by Descendents
12	"That's Up to Me"	1994	Skauch (EP)	Originally performed by Scumback
13	"A Bit of Muslin"	1994	Epitone (compilation)	-
14	"Melancholy Protection"	1994	Epitone (compilation)	-
15	"Shake Me (live)"	1994	Da Strike (single)	-
16	"Niap"	1994	Da Strike (single)	-
17	"Every Breath You Take"	1995	Cheap Shots (compilation)	Originally performed by The Police
18	"9 to 5"	1995	The Story of My Life (single)	Originally performed by Dolly Parton
19	"Dragster"	1995	The Story of My Life (single)	-
20	"An Elf and His Zippo"	1996	Move Your Car (single)	-
21	"Israelites"	1995	Lozin' Must (single)	Originally performed by Desmond Dekker
22	"Vixen"	1995	Lozin' Must (single)	-
23	"Softworld"	1994	Da Strike (single)	Japanese release only
24	"Entrance at Rudebrook"	1996	Move Your Car (single)	Japanese release only

== Personnel ==
Millencolin

- Nikola Šarčević – lead vocals, bass
- Erik Ohlsson – guitar
- Mathias Färm – guitar
- Fredrik Larzon – drums

== Charts ==
Chart performance for The Melancholy Collection
Chart (1999)	Peak position
Australian Albums (ARIA)	72
