= Chickenpox (band) =

Swedish ska band from 1994–2002

Chickenpox was a Swedish ska band signed to Burning Heart Records. They existed from 1994 until they broke up in 2002.

== Discography ==
=== Albums ===
- At Mickey Cohen's Thursdaynight Pokergame (1996, Burning Heart)
- Stay Away from the Windows (1998, Burning Heart)
- Approved by the Chickenpox (2001, Burning Heart)

=== Singles & EPs ===
- Dinnerdance and Latenightmusic EP (1994, Burning Heart)
- "Anything You Say" (1996, Burning Heart)
- "Truth of Our Time" (1998, Burning Heart)

== Sources ==
- Chickenpox at AllMusic
- Band bio @ Burning Heart
