= Pennybridge Pioneers =

Studio album by Millencolin
- Released: 22 February 2000
- Recorded: July–September 1999
- Studio: Westbeach Recorders, Hollywood, California
- Genre: Pop punk; punk rock; skate punk; alternative rock
- Length: 37:22
- Label: Burning Heart, Epitaph
- Producer: Brett Gurewitz

Millencolin chronology
The Melancholy Collection (1999)	Pennybridge Pioneers (2000)	Home from Home (2002)

Singles from Pennybridge Pioneers
- 1. "Penguins & Polarbears" Released: 24 January 2000; 2. "Fox" Released: 5 June 2000; 3. "No Cigar" Released: 8 May 2001

Pennybridge Pioneers is the fourth album by Swedish punk rock band Millencolin, released on 22 February 2000 by Epitaph Records. The album was their first album to move away from their ska punk elements in favor of a more alternative rock sound. It was also the band's first album recorded outside their native country of Sweden, and their first to be certified gold in sales after selling over 35,000 copies in Australia.

Its title is derived from the band's home town of Örebro, which jocularly translates to "Pennybridge" in English. "Fox" and "Penguins & Polarbears" were released as singles with accompanying music videos. "No Cigar" was also released as a single and EP and appeared in the soundtracks of the video games Tony Hawk's Pro Skater 2, Jeremy McGrath Supercross World, Tony Hawk's Pro Skater HD and Tony Hawk's Pro Skater 1 + 2. "Pepper" was also included in the soundtrack album Music from and Inspired by Tony Hawk's Pro Skater 3, though it was not included in the game itself.

== Production ==
Pennybridge Pioneers was recorded at Westbeach Recorders in Hollywood, California, with producer Brett Gurewitz. Sessions lasted from 28 July to 6 September 1999. Gurewitz and Donell acted as engineers; they were assisted by Jay Gordon. Eddie Schreyer mastered the album at Oasis Mastering.

== Release ==
On 3 November 1999, Pennybridge Pioneers was announced for release in February 2000. "Material Boy" was posted online on 10 November 1999. Pennybridge Pioneers was eventually released on 22 February 2000. Following this, the band appeared on Warped Tour, and the Epitaph Punkorama Tour. The band supported the Offspring on their west coast US tour in July and August 2001. While the band was initially scheduled to appear at Edgefest II in Canada, they instead played two shows with Blink-182.

To coincide with the 10th anniversary of the album, the band initially performed it in its entirety for a Canadian tour in September 2010, and then a South America tour in November 2010.

== Reception ==
Professional ratings
Review scores
Source	Rating
AllMusic	4/5 stars
CMJ New Music Report	Favorable
Exclaim!	Favorable
Ink 19	Unfavorable
Kerrang!	4/5 stars
Orlando Weekly	Favorable
Ox-Fanzine	Favorable
Rock Hard	8/10
Rolling Stone	3/5 stars

Pennybridge Pioneers was met with generally favorable reviews from music critics. It was certified platinum in Australia in May 2001.

== Track listing ==
All songs by Nikola Šarčević, except where noted. All lyrics by Sarcevic.

No.	Title	Writer(s)	Length
1.	"No Cigar"	Sarcevic; Mathias Färm	2:43
2.	"Fox"		2:03
3.	"Material Boy"	Sarcevic; Färm	2:23
4.	"Duckpond"		2:50
5.	"Right About Now"		1:48
6.	"Penguins & Polarbears"	Sarcevic; Färm	2:54
7.	"Hellman"	Sarcevic; Färm	2:41
8.	"Devil Me"		2:41
9.	"Stop to Think"		2:13
10.	"The Mayfly"		3:05
11.	"Highway Donkey"	Sarcevic; Färm	2:29
12.	"A-Ten"	Sarcevic; Färm	3:01
13.	"Pepper"		1:48
14.	"The Ballad"		4:51

== Personnel ==
Personnel per booklet.

Millencolin

- Erik Ohlsson – guitar, backing vocals
- Mathias Färm – guitar, backing vocals
- Fredrik Larzon – drums, backing vocals
- Nikola Šarčević – lead vocals, bass guitar, backing vocals, acoustic guitar (track 14)

Additional musicians

- Brett Gurewitz – backing vocals, guitar solo (track 11), piano (track 14), guitar (track 14)

Production and design

- Brett Gurewitz – producer, engineer
- Donell Cameron – engineer
- Eddie Schreyer – mastering
- Jay Gordon – assistant engineer
- Erik Ohlsson – oil painting, art, layout, single photo
- Magnus Sundholm – band photo
- Greg Truex – single photo
- Tive – single photo
- Petter Koubeck – single photo

== Charts ==
Chart performance for Pennybridge Pioneers
Chart (2000)	Peak position
Australian Albums (ARIA)	13
German Albums (Offizielle Top 100)	32
New Zealand Albums (RMNZ)	36
Swedish Albums (Sverigetopplistan)	33
Swiss Albums (Schweizer Hitparade)	67
