= Adept (band) =

Swedish metal band

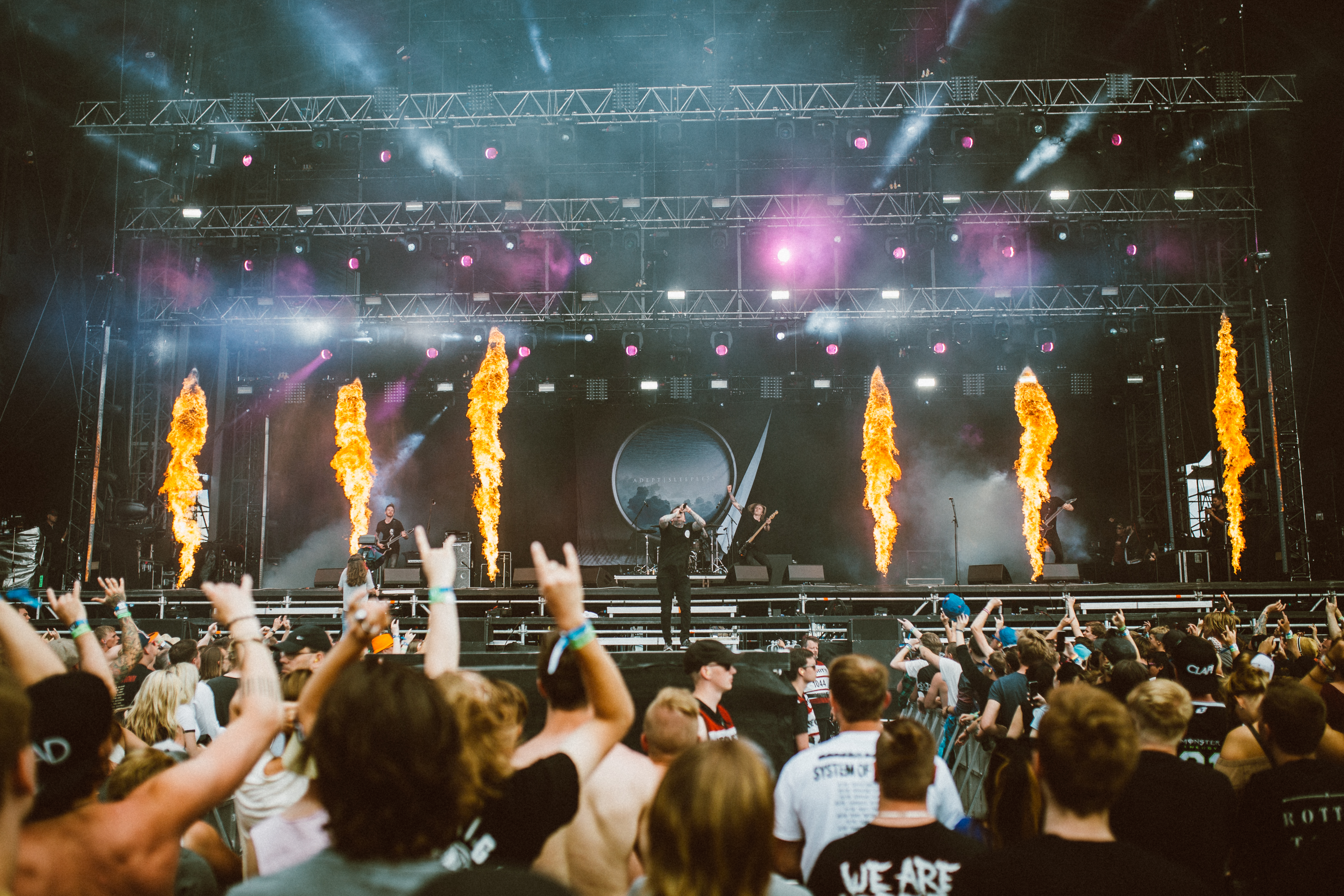
- Adept performing in 2017

Background information
- Origin: Trosa, Sweden
- Genres: Metalcore; post-hardcore
- Years active: 2004–present
- Labels: Napalm; Panic & Action
- Members: Robert Ljung; Gustav Lithammer; Kasper Larcombe-Tronstad; Filip Brandelius; Gabriel Hellmark
- Past members: Jacob Papinniemi; Andrew Brierly Chramer; Tobias Ottoson; Andreas Carlsson; Jerry Repo; Mikael Norén

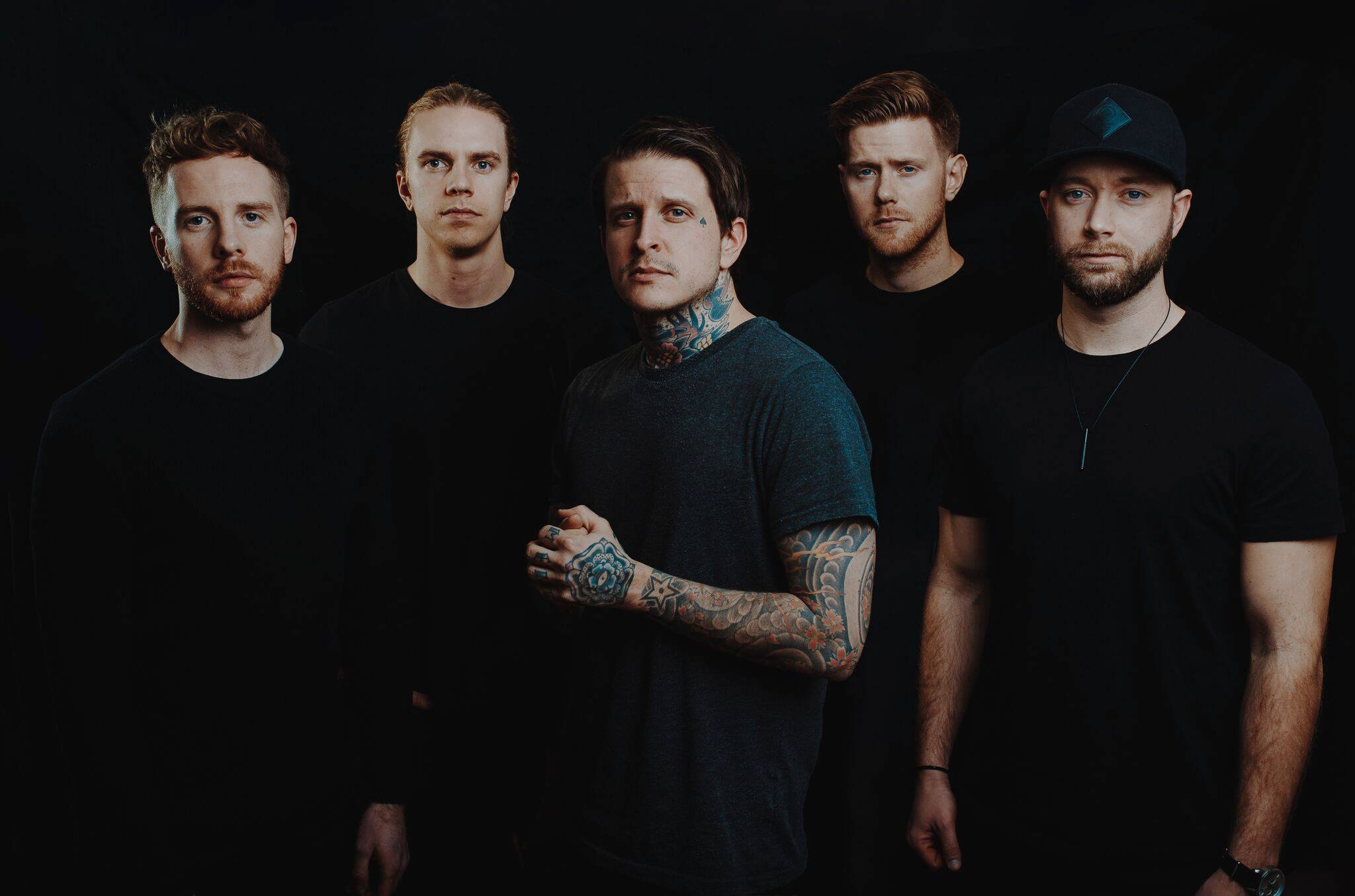
Adept 2019

Adept is a Swedish metalcore band from Trosa. Formed in 2004, the band currently consists of vocalist Robert Ljung, guitarists Gustav Lithammer and Kasper Larcombe-Tronstad, bassist Filip Brandelius and drummer Gabriel Hellmark. Adept have released three EPs and four studio albums to date, including Another Year of Disaster in 2009, Death Dealers in 2011, Silence the World in 2013, and Sleepless in 2016. After pausing band activities at the onset of the COVID-19 pandemic, Adept returned to the stage in November 2024 for a 20th anniversary show at Corefest in Stuttgart, Germany. In 2025, Adept released their fifth studio album, Blood Covenant.

== History ==
Adept was founded and self-released their first demo, Hopeless Illusions, in 2004. This was followed a year later by a second self-released demo, When the Sun Gave Up the Sky, and in 2006 by their first EP, The Rose Will Decay, released via Pretty Dirty Promotions. After a number of member changes, Adept gained prominence and was signed to Panic & Action. On February 4, 2009, they released their first full-length album, Another Year of Disaster. In 2010, Adept toured in Germany with Her Bright Skies (also signed to Panic & Action), playing six venues: Hamburg, Berlin, Osnabrück, Munich, Stuttgart and Cologne. In August 2010, Adept began working on a follow-up to Another Year of Disaster. They worked with Fredrik Nordström, a music producer who had previously worked with well-known acts such as In Flames, Bring Me the Horizon and At the Gates. That same year, Gustav Lithammer left his other post-hardcore band Saving Joshua to join Adept.

On March 11, 2011, Adept released their second album, Death Dealers, which saw their sound shifting from post-hardcore towards metalcore. They toured Europe for the first time in support of the album, starting in Sweden and moving on through France, Russia, Finland, Norway, Finland, the Czech Republic, Denmark, Hungary and Italy. In May they played some shows in Germany as support for As Blood Runs Black, Caliban and For Today, and also planned to play some shows in Austria and appeared as an opening act for August Burns Red. Adept released their third album Silence the World in late 2013, and supported it by once again setting out on a European tour.

On November 14, 2014, Adept announced via their Facebook page that their next album Sleepless would be released in 2015, while also confirming their appearance at that year's Impericon Festival, which toured Europe in April and May. However, they were forced to re-record the whole album due to contractual issues and ultimately ended up signing a new deal with Napalm Records in November 2015. Sleepless was finally released on February 19, 2016.

In October 2016, after playing various shows across Asia, the band announced the departure of guitarist Jerry Repo and drummer Gabriel Hellmark. The gaps in the band were filled by Kasper Larcombe-Tronstad of Saving Joshua on guitar and Mikael Norén, who is also playing for Walking With Strangers, on drums. Hellmark re-joined the band two years later. Adept performed a number of live shows in the subsequent years, and 2019 saw the 10th anniversary re-release of the band's debut album Another Year of Disaster. However, Adept ceased live activities with the onset of the COVID-19 pandemic in early 2020 and only posted a handful of studio updates to their social media pages in subsequent years.

This changed in November 2024, when Adept made their return to the stage with a show in Germany, celebrating their 20th anniversary as a band. In April 2025, Adept updated the band photo on their social media accounts and uploaded teaser videos for what turned out to be a new single. Titled "Heaven", the single marks the band's first new output in nine years and was released on May 12, accompanied by a music video. A second new song, titled "You" was released a month later, again with a music video. Their third new song, titled "Ignore the Sun", was released on July 15 along with an announcement of the band's first studio album in nine years. Titled Blood Covenant, the album is planned for release on October 24, followed by a 20th anniversary tour through the EU and UK in November and December, 2025. "Parting Ways" was released as the album's fourth single on August 12.

== Discography ==
Studio albums

Date	Title	Label
4 February 2009	Another Year of Disaster	Panic & Action
4 March 2011	Death Dealers	Panic & Action
22 March 2013	Silence the World	Panic & Action
19 February 2016	Sleepless	Napalm
1 February 2019	Another Year of Disaster (10 Year Anniversary Edition)	Self-released
24 October 2025	Blood Covenant	Napalm

EPs and demos

Date	Title	Label
2004	Hopeless Illusions (Demo)	Self-released
2005	When the Sun Gave Up the Sky (Demo)	Self-released
2006	The Rose Will Decay (EP)	Pretty Dirty Promotions

Music videos

- "At Least Give Me My Dreams Back, You Negligent Whore!"
- "Sound the Alarm"
- "Shark! Shark! Shark!"
- "The Ivory Tower"
- "Secrets"
- "The Toughest Kids"
- "Dark Clouds"
- "Carry the Weight"
- "Heaven"
- "You"
- "Blood Covenant"
