= Detox (song) =

2022 single by Lil Baby

Single by Lil Baby
- Released: September 2, 2022
- Length: 2:41
- Label: Quality Control Music; Motown; Universal Music Group
- Songwriter: Dominique Jones
- Producers: Cubeatz; Eza; KJ; Papamitrou; London Jae

Lil Baby singles chronology
"Come Up" (2022)	"Detox" (2022)	"Heyy" (2022)

"Detox" is a song by American rapper Lil Baby, released through album through Quality Control Music, Motown, Universal Music Group on September 2, 2022, as a single. In the United States, the song entered at number 25 on the Billboard Hot 100. The song was intended as the lead single for his then-untitled third studio album, eventually released as It's Only Me in October 2022.

== Charts ==
Chart performance for "Detox"
Chart (2022)	Peak position
Canada Hot 100 (Billboard)	48
Global 200 (Billboard)	59
UK Singles (Official Charts)	95
US Billboard Hot 100	25
US Hot R&B/Hip-Hop Songs (Billboard)	8
