= Millencolin =

Swedish punk rock band

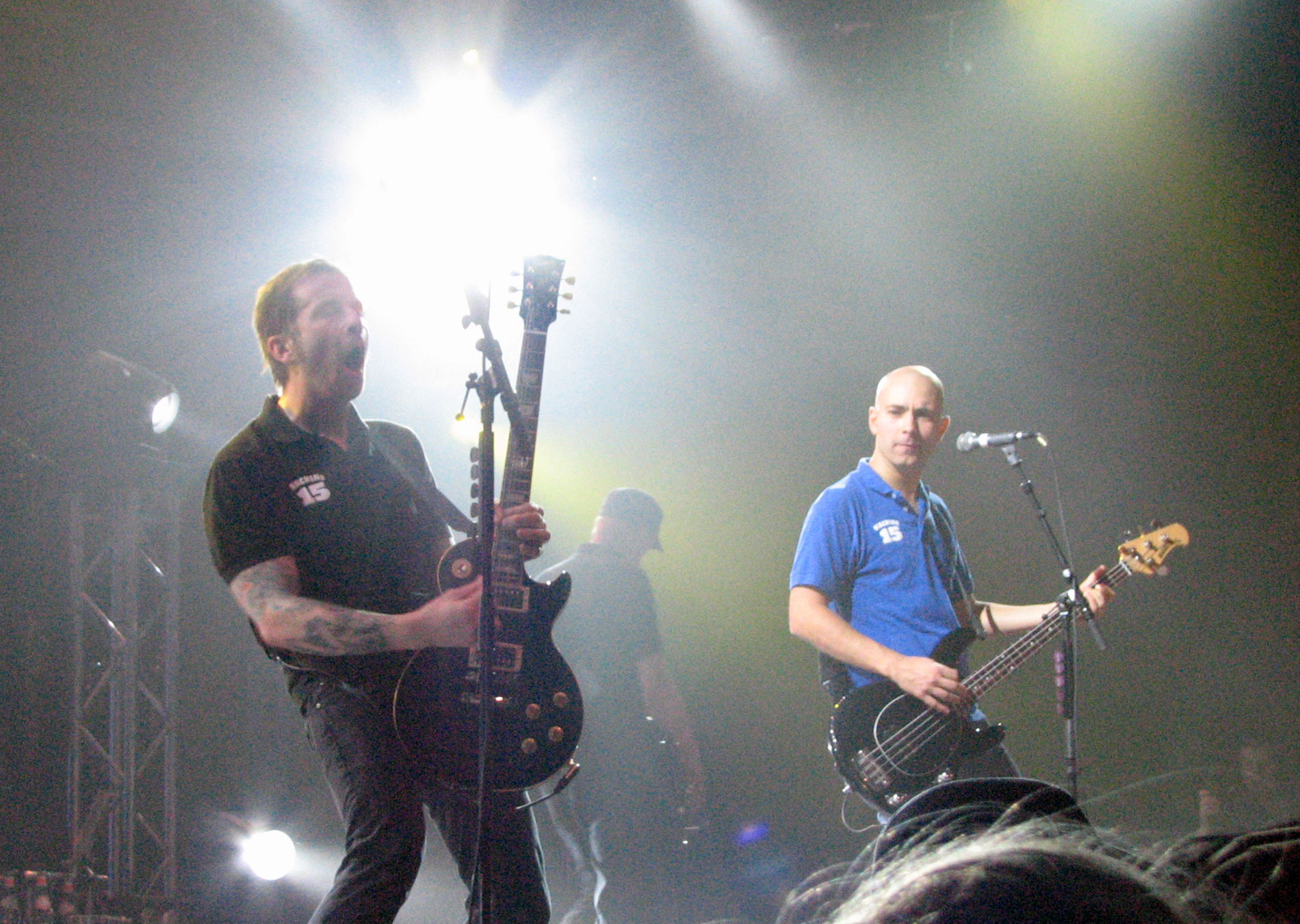
- Millencolin in 2008

Background information
- Origin: Örebro, Sweden
- Genres: Punk rock; skate punk; pop-punk; ska punk (early)
- Works: Discography
- Years active: 1992–present
- Labels: Burning Heart; Epitaph
- Members: Nikola Šarčević; Mathias Färm; Erik Ohlsson; Fredrik Larzon
- Website: millencolin.com

Millencolin is a Swedish punk rock band that was formed on 12 October 1992 by Nikola Šarčević, Mathias Färm, and Erik Ohlsson in Örebro, Sweden. In early 1993, drummer Fredrik Larzon joined the band. The name Millencolin is derived from the skateboard trick "melancholy".

== History ==
The original lineup, consisting of Šarčević (vocals and bass), Ohlsson (guitar), and Färm (drums), released their first demo tape, Goofy, in early 1993. Soon afterwards, Larzon joined the band to play drums, allowing Färm to perform as the second guitarist. In the summer of 1993, they recorded a second demo tape, Melack. The band sent the tape to Burning Heart Records, a new record label formed earlier that year. They signed Millencolin to do a CD single, which culminated in the release of Use Your Nose in November 1993. Success of the single prompted Burning Heart to sign the band to release a full album. In July 1994, the band released Skauch, initially planned to be a single for their new album. However, the band decided to record four cover songs as well and released it as an EP instead. They put out their first major release, Tiny Tunes, in 1994. The recording and mixing of the album took two weeks. Legal trouble with Warner Brothers over the title and cover artwork of the album led the band to re-release it in 1998 under the name Same Old Tunes.

Millencolin continued to tour and in 1995 brought out their second full-length album, Life on a Plate. This coincided with Millencolin beginning to tour outside of Scandinavia. At the end of 1995, the US record company Epitaph wanted to release Life on a Plate in the US, and the band agreed. They then toured further afield, touring Japan, Australia, Brazil and Canada, and played as part of the 1997 Warped Tour.

=== Pennybridge Pioneers and mainstream success ===
Further albums For Monkeys and compilation The Melancholy Collection followed, but the band's popularity increased in 2000 with the release of Pennybridge Pioneers, an album with more of a rock influence than the band's previous skate punk/ska punk sound. The recording took six weeks, following which they began their first major worldwide tour with initial dates in Wellington, New Zealand and Australia. This led to an early release of the album in Australia and New Zealand. Whilst on tour, Millencolin wrote and released Home from Home in 2002. In 2003, the band received the Best Swedish Rock award from the Swedish Hit Awards.

Kingwood, released in March 2005, marked the band's return to a faster and more traditional punk rock sound, collaborating it with their recently founded rock sound, and completed a world tour in follow-up of the album. The album debuted at No. 2 in the Swedish chart.

On 22 October 2007, the band entered the studio and started writing and recording songs for their seventh album Machine 15.

The band has hosted a skateboard contest at their own skatepark in Örebro, Sweden, named the Millencolin Open. They say they started this annual contest because skateboarding is what brought them together and now they have the chance to make something good of their town and of skateboarding.

Šarčević released his second solo album entitled Roll Roll and Flee, whilst Färm promoted his side project Franky Lee.

They wrote and released a single dedicated to their hometown football club Örebro SK titled "Örebro" in 2009. It was played in the club's stadium, Eyravallen for the first time on 11 May 2009 in the home game against Hammarby Fotboll.

Throughout 2010, they toured in Canada and South America, where they played Pennybridge Pioneers in its entirety. They also played the 2011 Soundwave Festival in Australia.

=== Millencolin 20 Year Festival ===
In 2012, Millencolin held their own festival to celebrate 20 years as a band. The "Millencolin 20 Year Festival" was a two-day open-air festival at Brunnsparken, Örebro, Sweden on the 8 and 9 June 2012. Millencolin closed both nights by doing two exclusive sets from the band's entire 20-year long career with different songs each night. In addition to Millencolin, several other international and national bands also played on stage. A temporary festival site was built, including a huge catering tent with food and drinks. In addition, WESC presented a skate contest, which also featured several pro skaters. There was also a camp for festival-goers, five minutes away from the festival and complete with its own waterpark.

The band had announced on Facebook earlier that a limited edition "yellow bird" toy would be available at the festival, but due to a delay in production the sale of these items was only possible on future tours. A limited edition (500 copies only) vinyl release of "Carry You" single, from the compilation album The Melancholy Connection, was available for sale at the festival.

== Members ==
- Nikola Šarčević – lead vocals, bass guitar, acoustic guitar (1992–present)
- Mathias Färm – guitar (1993–present), backing vocals (1999–present), drums (1992–1993)
- Erik Ohlsson – guitar (1992–present), backing vocals (1999–present)
- Fredrik Larzon – drums (1993–present), backing vocals (1999–2000)

== Discography ==
=== Studio albums ===
- Tiny Tunes (1994)
- Life on a Plate (1995)
- For Monkeys (1997)
- Pennybridge Pioneers (2000)
- Home from Home (2002)
- Kingwood (2005)
- Machine 15 (2008)
- True Brew (2015)
- SOS (2019)
