= Nikola Šarčević =

Swedish musician of Serbian origin (born 1974)

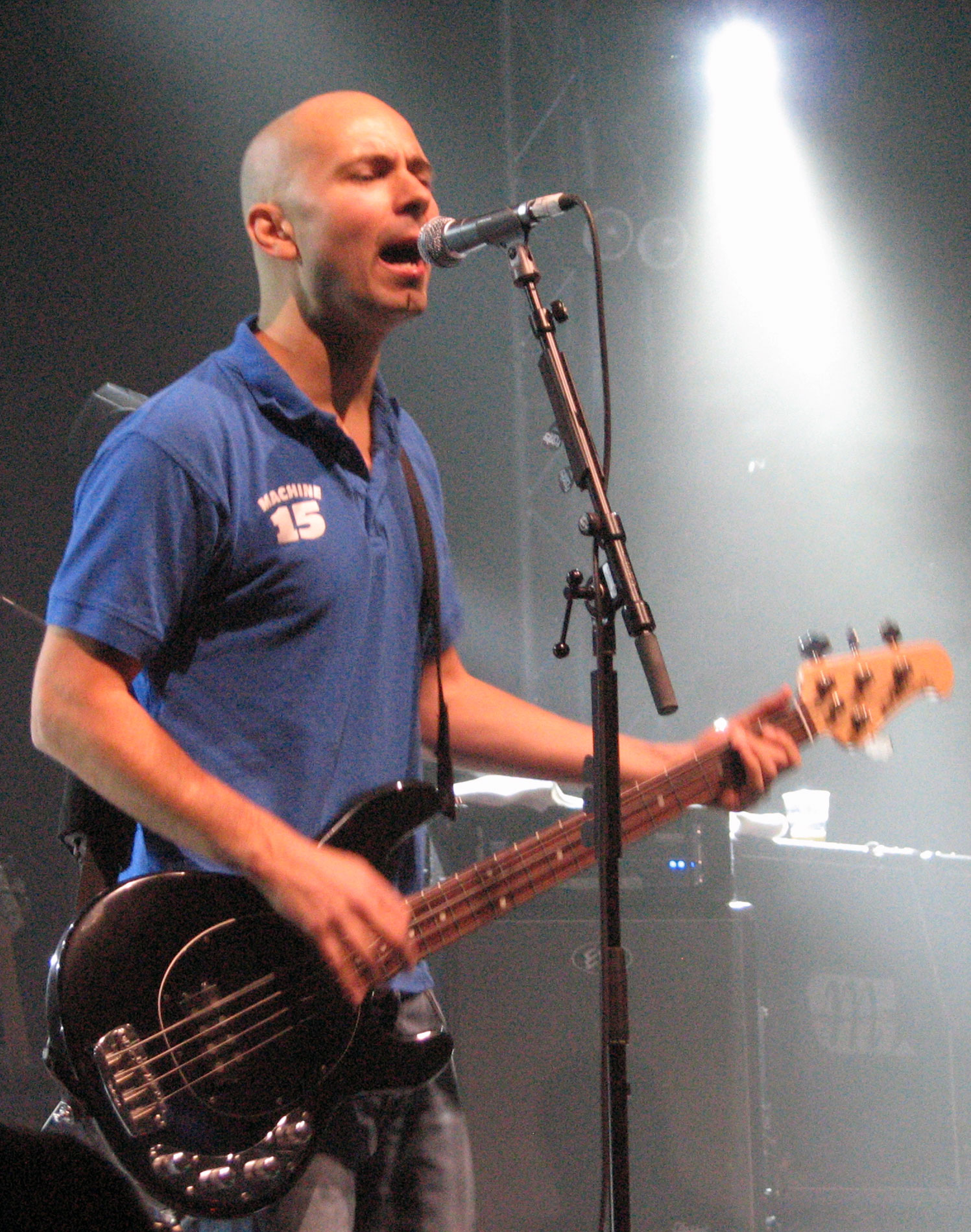
- Nikola Šarčević at Conventum, Örebro, Sweden, 12 April 2008.

Background information
- Born: Nikola Šarčević; 9 July 1974 (age 52); Örebro, Sweden
- Genres: Punk rock; pop-punk; alternative rock; folk rock; folk; pop
- Occupations: Musician; songwriter; singer
- Instruments: Vocals; bass; guitar; piano; keyboards; harmonica; percussion
- Labels: Burning Heart; Epitaph; Stalemate
- Member of: Millencolin
- Website: www.millencolin.com nikolasarcevic.com

Nikola Šarčević (Serbian Cyrillic: Никола Шарчевић; born 9 July 1974, Örebro) is a Swedish musician of Serbian origin. He is the bassist, vocalist, and primary songwriter for the Swedish punk rock band Millencolin and also has a solo career with four studio albums. He also runs the Swedish brewery Duckpond Brewing.

== Biography ==
His first band was Seigmenn. Lock-Sport-Krock was Šarčević's first solo album. The title comes from the name of an imaginary football team that he and his brother pretended to play in when they were young. His solo work is mostly composed of folk rock and country music. On 20 April 2003, the band cancelled their US Tour after Nikola reported the disappearance of his brother, Miodrag Šarčević. Miodrag was found, deceased, four years later. It is believed a few Millencolin songs such as “Happiness For Dogs” and “Farewell My Hell” were written about him.

Nikola was listed as one of the "World's Sexiest Vegetarians" in 2008 and 2009, despite the fact that Nikola claims he is not a vegetarian. Šarčević's second solo album, Roll Roll and Flee, was released on 23 October 2006.

On 2 December 2009, Šarčević announced on his official Facebook page that he would release his third solo record "Nikola & Fattiglapparna" in 2010. The 11-song album was his first release to be recorded entirely in Swedish. In 2010 it was released through his own label Stalemate Music.

He lives in Gothenburg with his wife Lisa, and three daughters.

== Discography ==
=== Seigmenn ===
==== Records ====
Year	Record	Album
1992	"Hårda Tider"	Demotape
1992	"En Sommar Dag"	Demotape
1992	"Omen"	Single

=== Millencolin ===
For his recordings with Millencolin, see Millencolin Discography

=== Solo career ===
==== Studio albums ====
Year	Album details
2004	Lock-Sport-Krock: Released: 24 March 2004; Label: Burning Heart / Epitaph
2006	Roll Roll and Flee: Released: 23 October 2006; Label: Burning Heart / Stalemate Music
2010	Nikola & Fattiglapparna: Released: 3 March 2010; Label: Stalemate Music
2013	Freedom to Roam: Released: 20 March 2013; Label: Stalemate Music

==== Singles ====
Year	Song	Album
2004	"Lovetrap"	Lock-Sport-Krock
2006	"Soul For Sale"	Roll Roll and Flee
2010	"Tro"	Nikola & Fattiglapparna
2013	"Ophelia"	Freedom To Roam
