= Mathias Färm =

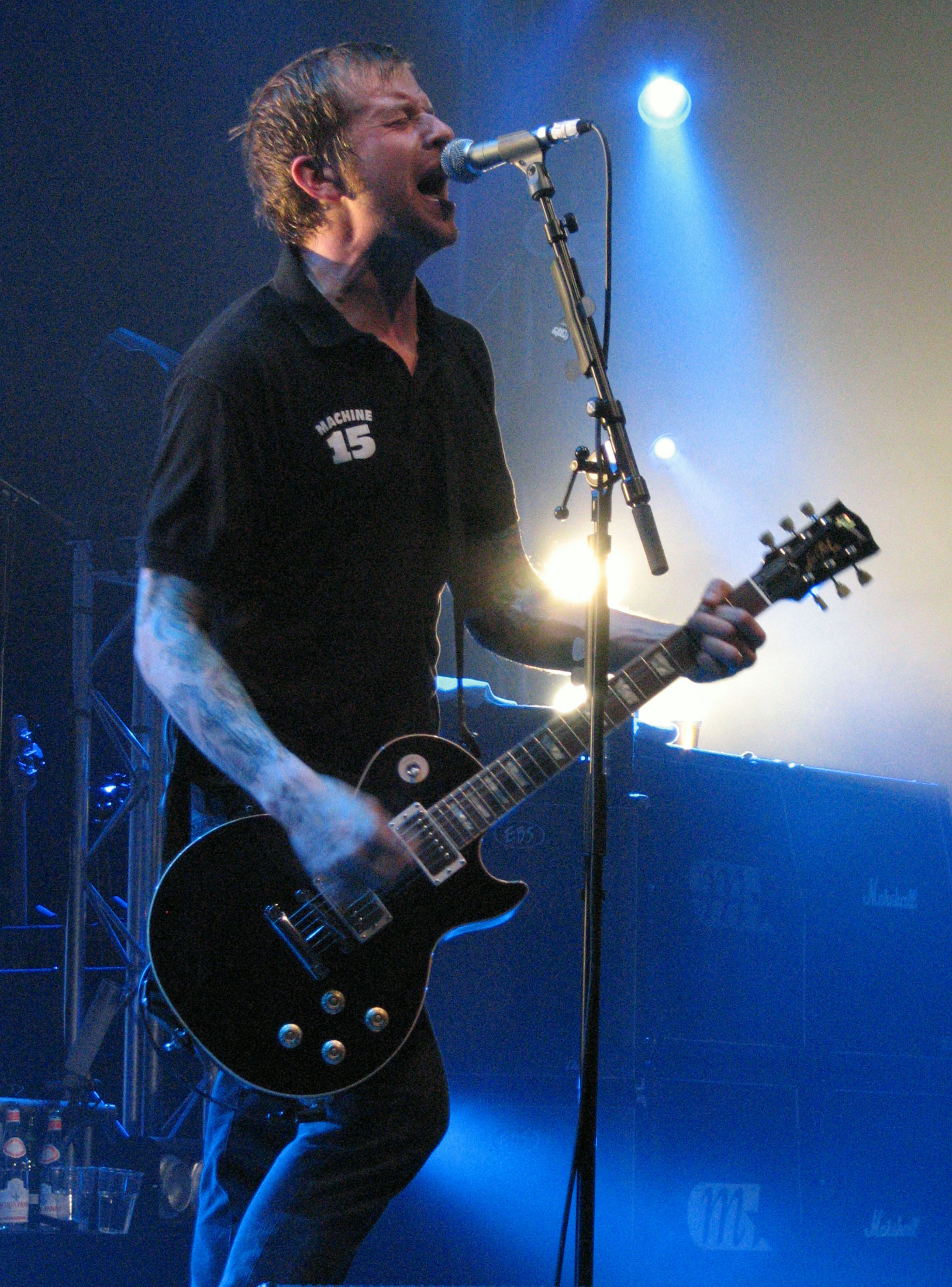
- Mathias Färm at Conventum, Örebro, Sweden April 12, 2008.

Background information
- Born: Lars Åke Mathias Färm; September 9, 1974 (age 52); Örebro, Sweden
- Genres: Punk rock; pop-punk
- Occupations: Guitarist; vocalist
- Instruments: Guitar; drums; vocals
- Years active: 1992–present
- Labels: Burning Heart; Epitaph
- Website: www.millencolin.com

Mathias Färm (born September 9, 1974, in Örebro, Sweden) is a guitar player, best known as a member of the Swedish punk rock band Millencolin. He is also the frontman of a punk band named Franky Lee, a side-project of Millencolin.

He started skating in 1987 and started listening to Operation Ivy, Mc Rad, the Descendents and Odd Man Out because of the skate videos. Early in 1992 he and Nikola Šarčević were members of a band named Seigmen, which was a punk rock band singing in Swedish. Färm runs a studio named Soundlab Studios, which he started with the help of Mieszko Talarczyk the former lead singer of Swedish grindcore band Nasum.

He was the inaugural drummer for Millencolin but soon switched to guitar when Millencolin's current drummer Fredrik Larzon joined the band in 1993. This change was made because most of Millencolin's songs required two guitars on stage to duplicate the studio recorded sounds. Färm was also a more proficient guitarist than drummer. Currently, he lives in Örebro, Sweden. He's a vegetarian. Mathias plays most rhythm guitars on the first three Millencolin albums, but in the more recent albums, he performs most of the lead guitars, notably octave-style riffs and some solos.
