= Burning Heart Records =

Independent record label from Sweden

- Founded: 1993
- Founder: Peter Ahlqvist
- Distributor: Epitaph Records
- Genre: Punk rock; hardcore punk
- Country of origin: Sweden
- Location: Örebro

Burning Heart Records is an independent record label formed in 1993 in Fagersta, Sweden, and currently based in Örebro. It has a close affiliation with Californian label Epitaph Records, who own the rights to distribute Burning Heart's output in North America. It also started a German office in Berlin in the end of 2003.

Burning Heart folded in 2010 and Peter Ahlqvist kept working at Panic & Action, which he founded together with Kid Down vocalist Eric Höjdén. In 2014 Peter succeeded to come with an agreement with Epitaph over the rights to the name and logo of Burning Heart and reactivated the label. Panic & Action also announced its closure and all signed artists was transferred over to Burning Heart.

Burning Heart has proven very successful in launching European (especially Swedish) bands to a global audience. Their successes have included The Hives, Turbonegro, The (International) Noise Conspiracy, Millencolin, No Fun at All and Refused. The label focuses on punk music, but has also released rock, ska, noise and hip hop records.

== Released bands ==
These are some of the bands with albums released by Burning Heart Records.

- 59 Times the Pain
- Asta Kask
- The Accidents
- Bodyjar
- Bombshell Rocks
- Boysetsfire
- Booze & Glory
- Breach
- Chickenpox
- Division of Laura Lee
- Donots
- Flogging Molly
- Franky Lee
- Give Up the Ghost
- Her Bright Skies
- Hell Is for Heroes
- The Hives
- Home Grown
- The (International) Noise Conspiracy
- Liberator
- Looptroop Rockers
- The Lost Patrol Band
- Kid Down
- Midtown
- Millencolin
- Moneybrother
- Monster
- Nasum
- Nine
- No Fun at All
- Parkway Drive
- Promoe
- Raised Fist
- Randy
- Refused
- Samiam
- Satanic Surfers
- Section 8
- Sounds Like Violence
- Turbonegro
- The Weakerthans

== See also ==
- List of record labels
