= Refused discography =

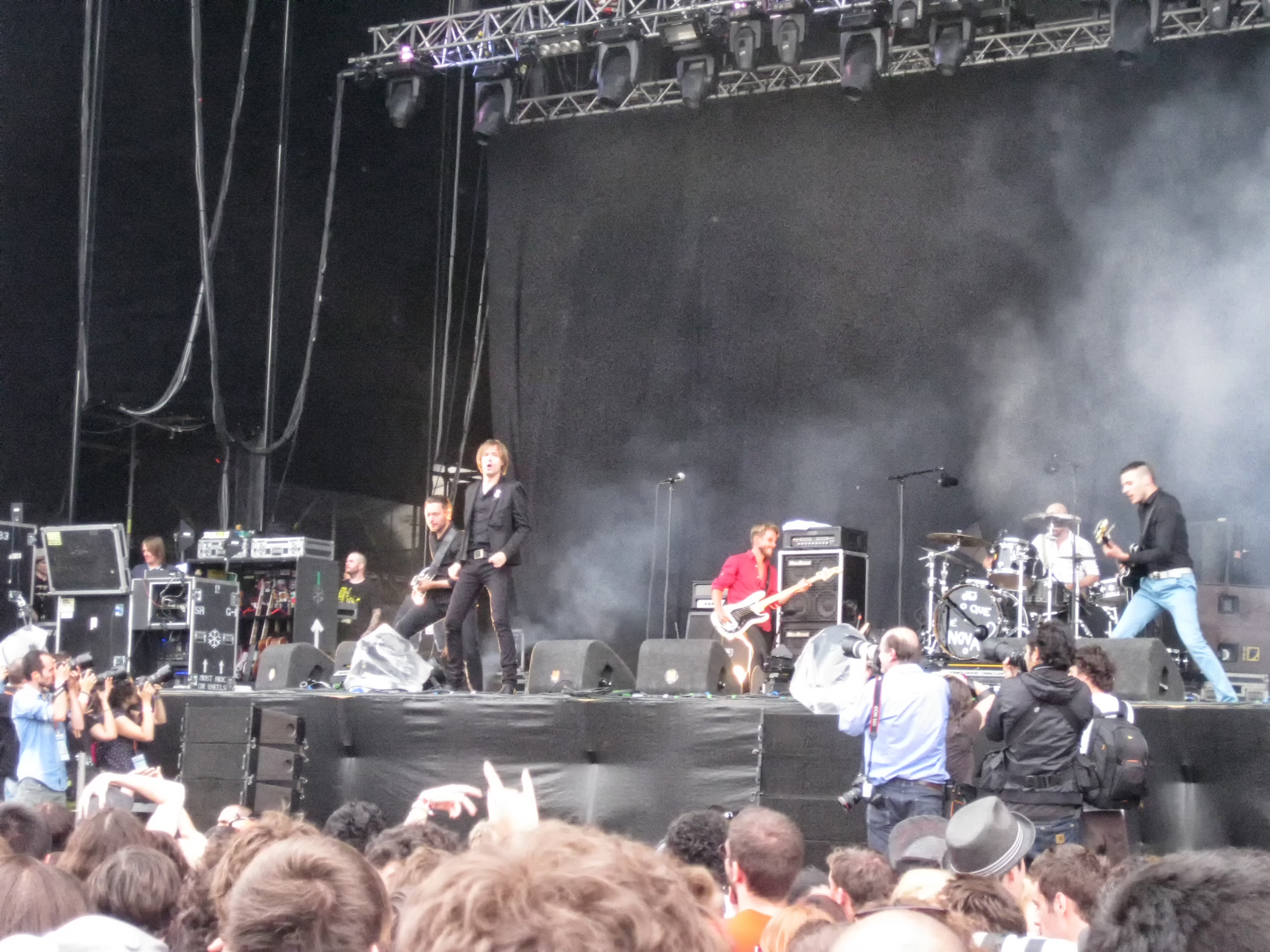
Refused performing in 2012

Swedish hardcore punk band Refused had a brief but prolific seven-year run before originally disbanding in 1998. They once again disbanded in 2025.

== Studio albums ==
=== Studio albums ===
Year	Title	Album details	Peak chart positions						
Year	Title	Album details	SWE	AUS	AUT	FIN	GER	US	US Rock
1994	This Just Might Be... the Truth	Released: 1 October 1994; Re-released: 1 January 1997; Label: Startrec, We Bite, Burning Heart; Format: CD, cassette, LP	—	—	—	—	—	—	—
1996	Songs to Fan the Flames of Discontent	Released: 15 September 1996; Re-released: 24 May 2004; Label: Startrec, We Bite, Victory, Burning Heart; Format: CD, cassette, LP	30	—	—	—	—	—	—
1998	The Shape of Punk to Come: A Chimerical Bombination in 12 Bursts	Released: 27 October 1998; Re-released: 21 April 2002; Label: Startracks, Burning Heart, Epitaph; Format: CD, LP, DVD-Audio	30	—	—	—	—	—	—
2015	Freedom	Releases: 30 June 2015; Label: Epitaph; Format: CD, LP	2	10	54	35	37	161	23
2019	War Music	Releases: 18 October 2019; Label: Search and Destroy Records; Format: CD, LP	26	—	—	—	40	—	—
"—" denotes a recording that did not chart or was not released in that territory.

== Compilation albums ==
Year	Album details
1997	The E.P. Compilation: Released: 15 September 1997; Re-released: 2002; Label: Startrec / We Bite Records / Burning Heart Records; Format: CD, cassette, LP
1997	The Demo Compilation: Released: 15 September 1997; Label: Burning Heart Records / Startrec; Format: CD

== EPs/MCDs ==
- Refused (1992, self-released) CS
- Second Demo: Operation Headfirst (1992, Umeå Hardcore Records) CS
- This Is the New Deal (1993, Burning Heart Records) CD/CS
- Pump the Brakes (1994, Startrec Records) CD/CS
- Everlasting (1994, Startrec Records, We Bite, Org Music, Equal Vision Records) CD, CS, 12"
- Refused Loves Randy (1995, Startrec Records) CD
- Rather Be Dead E.P. (1996, Startrec Records, Burning Heart Records, Epitaph) CD/12"
- The New Noise Theology E.P. (1998, Burning Heart Records, Honey Bear Records) CD/12"
- Three Songs from the Shape of Punk to Come (1998, Burning Heart, Epitaph Records) CD
- New Noise (2010, Epitaph Records) CD
- Servants of Death (2018)
- Not Fit For Broadcast (Live at the BBC) (2020, Spinefarm Records, Search and Destroy Records) 12"
- The Malignant Fire (2020, Spinefarm Records, Search and Destroy Records) 12"

== DVDs ==
- Refused Are Fucking Dead (2006)

== Compilations ==
- Really Fast Vol.8 (1993) - LP (Really Fast)
  - I Wish (Taken from This Is The New Deal)
- Northcore: The Polar Scene Compilation (1994) - CD (Burning Heart)
  - The New Deal (Previously Unreleased Version)
  - Guilty (Previously Unreleased)
- Hardcore For The Masses Vol.2 (1994) - CD (Burning Heart)
  - The Real (Previously Unreleased Version)
- Cheap Shots - CD (1994) (Burning Heart)
  - Hate Breeds Hate (Taken from This Is The New Deal)
- Adrenalin (1994) - CD (Luger)
  - Pump The Brakes (Taken from This Just Might Be...The Truth)
  - Strength (Taken from This Just Might Be...The Truth)
- Straight Edge As Fuck (1994) - MCD (Desperate Fight Records)
  - Everlasting (Previously Unreleased Version)
- Straight Edge As Fuck Vol.2 (1995) - CD (Desperate Fight Records)
  - Cheap... (Previously Unreleased)
- Purple Pain (1995) - CD (Dolores)
  - Let's Go Crazy (Previously unreleased / Written by Prince)
- Best Alternative (1996) - CD (Arcade)
  - Return To The Closet (Taken from Songs To Fan The Flames Of Discontent)
- Kittenish Vol.4 (1996) - CD (Border)
  - Coup D'état (Taken from Songs To Fan The Flames Of Discontent)
- Still from the Heart 199? - CD (We Bite)
  - Rather Be Dead (Taken from Songs To Fan The Flames Of Discontent)
- Equal Vision Records Sampler 199? - CD (Equal Vision)
  - Sunflower Princess (Taken from Everlasting)
- Defenders Of The Oppressed Breed 199? - CD (Veggie Music)
  - Jag Äter Inte Mina Vänner (Taken from Rather Be Dead E.P)
- Victory Promo 02 (1996) - CD (Victory)
  - Coup D'état (Taken from Songs To Fan The Flames Of Discontent)
- Children In Heat (1996) - CD (Hellbound Heart)
  - Bullet (Previously Unreleased / Written by The Misfits)
- Victory Style Vol.2 (1997) - CD (Victory)
  - It's Not O.K... (Taken from Songs To Fan The Flames Of Discontent)
- Popstad Umeå (1997) - CD (Nons)
  - Rather Be Dead (Taken from Songs To Fan The Flames Of Discontent)
- Straight Edge As Fuck Vol.3 (1997) - CD (Desperate Fight Records)
  - New Noise (Previously Unreleased Version)
- 100% Adrenalin (1997) - CD (MRN)
  - Coup d'etad (Unreleased live-version)
- Cheap Shots Vol.3 (1998) - CD (Burning Heart)
  - Rather Be Dead (Taken from Songs To Fan The Flames Of Discontent)
  - The Shape Of Punk To Come (Taken from The Shape Of Punk To Come)
- Sweden Deluxe (1998) - CD (Moondog)
  - New Noise (Taken from The Shape Of Punk To Come)
- Still Screaming (1998) - CD/LP (Burning Heart)
  - The Deadly Rhythm (taken from The Shape Of Punk To Come)
  - Peek-A-Boo (Previously Unreleased)
- Better Living Through Reckless Experimentation 199? - CD (Barcode)
  - The Deadly Rhythm (taken from The Shape Of Punk To Come)
- Punk mob 199? - CD (???)
  - New Noise (Taken from The Shape Of Punk To Come)
- Punk-O-Rama Vol.4 (1999) - CD (Epitaph)
  - Summerholidays Vs. Punkroutine (Taken from The Shape Of Punk To Come)
- Can't Stop This Train (1999) - CD (Join The Team Player)
  - Nothing New Again (Previously Unreleased)
- Rock 'N' Snow 199?/200? - CD (???)
  - New Noise (Taken from The Shape Of Punk To Come)
- Metroschifter: Encapsulated (Tribute) (2001) - CD (Doghouse)
  - L-182 (Previously Unreleased / Written by Metroschifter)
- Cheap Shots Vol.4 (2000) - CD (Burning Heart)
  - New Noise (Taken from The Shape Of Punk To Come)
- Burning Heart Records: Smash It Up! (2000) - CD (Burning Heart)
  - Summerholiday vs. Punkroutine (Taken from The Shape Of Punk To Come)
- For Those Who Stand (2001) - CD (Tear It Down)
  - The Deadly Rhythm (taken from The Shape Of Punk To Come)
- Cheap Shots Vol.5 (2001) - CD (Burning Heart)
  - Rather Be Dead (Taken from Songs To Fan The Flames Of Discontent)
- Punk-O-Rama Vol.5 (2001) - CD (Epitaph)
  - Refused Are Fucking Dead - Remix (Taken from The New Noise Theology E.P)
- Punk-O-Rama Vol.8 (2003) - 2xCD (Epitaph)
  - Coup D'état (Taken from Songs To Fan The Flames Of Discontent)
- Startracks (2003) - CD (Startracks)
  - Pump The Brakes (Taken from This Just Might Be...The Truth)
- Punk-O-Rama Vol.9 (2004) - CD+DVD (Epitaph)
  - Liberation Frequency (Taken from The Shape Of Punk To Come)
- Victory Video Sampler 199? - VHS (Victory)
  - Rather Be Dead (Taken from Songs To Fan The Flames Of Discontent)
- Flame Still Burns (1999) - VHS (Burning Heart)
  - New Noise (Taken from The Shape Of Punk To Come)
  - Rather Be Dead (Taken from Songs To Fan The Flames Of Discontent)
- Hang the VJ (2001) - DVD (Burning Heart)
  - New Noise (Taken from The Shape Of Punk To Come)
  - Rather Be Dead (Taken from Songs To Fan The Flames Of Discontent)
  - Pump The Brakes (Taken from This Just Might Be The Truth)
  - Hate Breeds Hate (Taken from This Is The New Deal)
- Punk-O-Rama Vol.1 (2003) - DVD (Epitaph)
  - New Noise (Taken from The Shape Of Punk To Come)

== Singles and music videos ==
- "Hate Breeds Hate" (1993)
- "Pump The Brakes" (1994)
- "Rather Be Dead" (1996)
- "New Noise" (1997)
- "Elektra" (2015)
- "Dawkins Christ" (2015)
- "Servants of Death" (2015)
- "Blood Red" (2019)
- "REV001" (2019)
- "Economy of Death" (2019)
- "Born On The Outs" (2020)
- "Malfire" (2020)
- "The Deadly Rhythm" (2024)

== Bootlegs ==
- Split with Abhinanda
  - Year: 1997
  - Format: 7"
  1. Guilty
  2. Let's go crazy
  3. Spiritual game
  4. Revolution
- Their last concert in Europe
  - Recorded: 1998
  - Release Year:199?-200?
  - Format: CD-R
  1. The shape of punk to come
  2. The Refused party program
  3. Circle pit
  4. Hook, line and sinker
  5. Refused are fuckin dead
  6. Rather be dead
  7. Burn it
  8. The deadly rhythm
  9. Pretty face
  10. New noise
  11. Tannhäuser
  12. Derivé
