= The E.P. Compilation =

Compilation album by Refused
- Released: January 1997; 1 July 2002 (re-release)
- Recorded: 1995–1998
- Genre: Hardcore punk, post-hardcore
- Length: 64:48 (1997 version); 57:09 (2002 version)
- Label: Burning Heart; Epitaph
- Producer: Pelle Gunnerfeldt

Refused chronology
Songs to Fan the Flames of Discontent (1996)	The E.P. Compilation (1997)	The Demo Compilation (1997)

Professional ratings
Review scores
Source	Rating
AllMusic	4.5/5 stars

The E.P. Compilation is a compilation album by Swedish band Refused, originally released in 1997. The album, which consists of songs from Refused's EPs, was reissued in 1999 as This Album Contains Old Songs & Old Pictures, Vol. 1. A different edition was released in 2002 and reissued in 2004.

== Overview ==
The 2002 and 1997 versions are very different. Although they both contain most of Refused's singles, the 1997 version contains many rarities, such as the Misfits cover "Bullet," to which Epitaph was unable to secure the rights for 2002 re-release.

== Track listing ==
All tracks are written by Refused, except where noted.

1997 version
No.	Title	Writer(s)	Length
1.	"Circle Pit"		2:15
2.	"Lick It Clean"		3:01
3.	"Jag Äter Inte Mina Vänner" (featuring Thomas Di Leva)	Refused, Di Leva	4:42
4.	"Voodoo People" (The Prodigy cover)	Liam Howlett, Gylan Kain	3:00
5.	"Bullet" (The Misfits cover)	Glenn Danzig	1:16
6.	"Cheap"		1:57
7.	"Burn It"		3:13
8.	"Symbols"		3:41
9.	"Sunflower Princess"		2:00
10.	"I Am Not Me"		2:30
11.	"Everlasting"		3:08
12.	"The Real"		2:34
13.	"Pretty Face"		2:14
14.	"Half Mast" (Born Against cover)	Sam McPheeters	2:17
15.	"Perception"		2:24
16.	"Who Died?"		1:37
17.	"The New Deal"		2:50
18.	"Guilty"		3:20
19.	"Hate Breeds Hate"		3:04
20.	"Break"		1:58
21.	"Where's Equality?"		2:12
22.	"Soft"		2:45
23.	"I Wish" / "D.R.S.S." (Afro Jetz cover)	Dennis Lyxzén	6:48

Tracks 1–4 taken from the Rather Be Dead E.P. (1996), track 5 taken from the Children in Heat compilation (1996), track 6 taken from the Straight Edge As Fuck Compilation II (1995), tracks 7–14 taken from the Everlasting E.P. (1995), tracks 15–16 taken from Pump the Brakes (1994), tracks 17–18 taken from the Northcore: The Polar Scene Compilation (1994), tracks 19–23 taken from This Is the New Deal (1993)

2002 version
No.	Title	Writer(s)	Length
1.	"New Noise"		5:11
2.	"Blind Date"		3:13
3.	"Poetry Written in Gasoline"		7:15
4.	"Refused Are Fucking Dead" (Bomba Je Remix, Long Version)		5:45
5.	"Rather Be Dead"		3:23
6.	"Jag Äter Inte Mina Vänner" (featuring Thomas Di Leva)	Refused, Di Leva	4:42
7.	"Circle Pit"		2:16
8.	"Lick It Clean"		3:00
9.	"Voodoo People" (The Prodigy cover)	Howlett, Kain	3:00
10.	"Burn It"		3:13
11.	"Symbols"		3:41
12.	"Sunflower Princess"		2:00
13.	"I Am Not Me"		2:30
14.	"Everlasting"		3:08
15.	"The Real"		2:34
16.	"Pretty Face"		2:14

Tracks 1–4 taken from The New Noise Theology E.P. (1998), tracks 5–9 taken from the Rather Be Dead E.P. (1996), tracks 10–16 taken from the Everlasting E.P. (1995)

== Personnel ==
Refused

- Dennis Lyxzén – lead vocals
- Kristofer Steen – guitar, bass
- Jon Brännström – guitar, backing vocals, synthesizer
- Magnus Björklund – bass
- David Sandström – drums

Additional

- Thomas Di Leva – additional vocals on "Jag Äter Inte Mina Vänner"
- Pelle Gunnerfeldt – producer, engineer
- Pelle Henricsson – engineer, mastering
- Fred Estby – engineer
- Eskil Lövström – engineer
- Tomas Skogsberg – engineer
