= The New Noise Theology E.P. =

EP by Refused
- Released: 17 November 1998
- Recorded: 1997
- Genre: Hardcore punk, post-hardcore, art punk, electronic
- Length: 22:35
- Label: Burning Heart, Epitaph, Honey Bear
- Producer: Eskil Lövström, Andreas Nilsson, Pelle Henricsson, Refused

Refused chronology
The Shape of Punk to Come (1998)	The New Noise Theology E.P. (1998)	Refused Are Fucking Dead (2006)

Professional ratings
Review scores
Source	Rating
AllMusic	3.5/5 stars

The New Noise Theology E.P. is a release by Swedish hardcore punk band Refused, which features their flagship song "New Noise", already on the album The Shape of Punk to Come, and the previously unreleased songs "Blind Date" and "Poetry Written in Gasoline". A remix of "Refused Are Fucking Dead", a song also found on The Shape of Punk to Come, also features on the release. These songs later appeared, in the same order, on the 2004 re-issue of The E.P. Compilation.

Quite unusually, it appears that the cover art on the CD has been switched over, so that the graphics made for the back of the CD appear on the front, and vice versa. The music video for "New Noise" was available on the CD (enhanced CD) version of the album.

== Track listing ==
1. "New Noise" – 5:12
2. "Blind-Date" – 3:15
3. "Poetry Written In Gasoline" – 7:17
4. "Refused Are Fuckin' Dead" (Bomba Je Remix, Long Version) – 5:47

== Personnel ==
- Dennis Lyxzén – vocals
- Kristofer Steen – guitar
- Jon Brännström – guitar, sampling, programming, synthesizer
- Magnus Björklund – bass
- David Sandström – drums
