= Refused Reunion Tour =

2012 concert tour by Refused

- Tour by Refused
- Location: North America; Europe; Asia; Australia
- Start date: 29 February 2012
- End date: 15 December 2012
- Legs: 11
- No. of shows: 46 in Europe; 30 in North America; 1 in Asia; 6 in Australia; 82 in total

Refused concert chronology
- The Shape of Punk to Come Tour (1998); Refused Reunion Tour (2012); Freedom Tour (2015)

The Reunion Tour is a concert tour by Swedish post-hardcore band Refused, celebrating the band's reunion, after breaking-up in 1998. The tour began with a secret warm-up shows in the band's hometown of Umeå on 29 February 2012, as well as another small show in Stockholm, on 30 March, after which the band headed to start the official tour, in the United States.

The tour was not intended to be a full reunion and the band announced their show at the Exel Arena in Umeå, Sweden on 15 December would be their final show for three years.

== Background ==
BBC Radio 1's "Punk Show" announced on 2 January 2012, that Refused would be reuniting this year for a series of show. This was confirmed on frontman Dennis Lyxzén's Facebook page on 9 January 2012, as well as announcing the band's first reunion show, at the Coachella Valley Music and Arts Festival. Later, some European festival appearances were announced, such as Way Out West Festival in Sweden, and Groezrock in Belgium. The band was set to perform at the Sonisphere Festival, being their only exclusive UK appearance on the tour, though after the festival was cancelled, the band was instead booked to appear on the Download Festival.

=== Final shows ===
The band announced five final shows, one in Norway and four in Sweden; with the band's final show taking place in their hometown of Umeå, Sweden.

Following the band's show at the Exel Arena in Umeå on 15 December, the band played four songs at an afterparty show the same night with the bands Final Exit and Abhinanda playing reunion shows.

=== Return ===
On 25 November 2014, Refused announced that they will perform their first shows in three years at the Reading and Leeds Festivals, Groezrock and Amnesia Rockfest in the summer of 2015. They also headlined Punk Rock Bowling in Las Vegas in May 2015. The concerts were accompanied by the release of a new album called Freedom.

== Set list ==
Warm-up shows
- "The Shape of Punk to Come"
- "The Refused Party Program"
- "Refused Are Fuckin' Dead"
- "Rather Be Dead"
- "Coup d'état"
- "Summerholidays vs. Punkroutine"
- "The Deadly Rhythm"
- "Hook, Line and Sinker"
- "Circle Pit"
- "Liberation Frequency"
- "Life Support Addiction"
- "Worms of the Senses / Faculties of the Skull"

Encore

- "Everlasting"
- "New Noise"
North America / 12 April 2012
- "The Shape of Punk to Come"
- "The Refused Party Program"
- "Liberation Frequency"
- "Rather Be Dead"
- "Coup d'état"
- "Summerholidays vs. Punkroutine"
- "The Deadly Rhythm"
- "Hook, Line and Sinker"
- "Circle Pit"
- "Refused Are Fuckin' Dead"
- "Life Support Addiction"
- "Worms of the Senses / Faculties of the Skull"

Encore

- "New Noise"
- "Tannhäuser / Derivè"
North America / 18 April 2012
- "Worms of the Senses / Faculties of the Skull"
- "The Refused Party Program"
- "Liberation Frequency"
- "Rather Be Dead"
- "Coup d'état"
- "Summerholidays vs. Punkroutine"
- "The Deadly Rhythm"
- "Hook, Line and Sinker"
- "Everlasting"
- "Refused Are Fuckin' Dead"
- "The Slayer"
- "The Shape of Punk to Come"

Encore

- "New Noise"
- "Tannhäuser / Derivè"
North America / 22–23 April 2012
- "Worms of the Senses / Faculties of the Skull"
- "The Refused Party Program"
- "Liberation Frequency"
- "Rather Be Dead"
- "Coup d'état"
- "Summerholidays vs. Punkroutine"
- "The Deadly Rhythm"
- "Hook, Line and Sinker"
- "Refused Are Fuckin' Dead"
- "The Slayer" / "Life Support Addiction" (Varied between shows)
- "It's Clobberin' Time" (Sick of It All cover) (w/ Lou Koller)
- "Injustice System" (Sick of It All cover) (w/ Lou Koller)
- "The Shape of Punk to Come"

Encore

- "New Noise"
- "Tannhäuser / Derivè"
Europe, Leg #1
- "Worms of the Senses / Faculties of the Skull"
- "The Refused Party Program"
- "Liberation Frequency"
- "Rather Be Dead"
- "Coup d'état"
- "Summerholidays vs. Punkroutine"
- "The Deadly Rhythm"
- "Hook, Line and Sinker"
- "Everlasting" (Played on only two dates)
- "Refused Are Fuckin' Dead"
- "Life Support Addiction"

Encore

- "The Shape of Punk to Come"
- "New Noise"
- "Tannhäuser / Derivè"
Asia
- "Worms of the Senses / Faculties of the Skull"
- "The Refused Party Program"
- "Liberation Frequency"
- "Rather Be Dead"
- "Coup d'état"
- "Summerholidays vs. Punkroutine"
- "The Deadly Rhythm"
- "Hook, Line and Sinker"
- "Refused Are Fuckin' Dead"
- "The Shape of Punk to Come"
- "New Noise"
- "Tannhäuser / Derivè"
North America, Leg #2
- "Worms of the Senses / Faculties of the Skull"
- "The Refused Party Program"
- "Liberation Frequency"
- "Rather Be Dead"
- "Coup d'état"
- "Summerholidays vs. Punkroutine"
- "The Deadly Rhythm"
- "Hook, Line and Sinker"
- "Everlasting" / "The Slayer" (Varied between shows)
- "Refused Are Fuckin' Dead"
- "Circle Pit"
- "Life Support Addiction" / "Last Minute Prayer" (Varied between shows)
- "The Shape of Punk to Come"

Encore

- "New Noise"
- "Tannhäuser / Derivè"
North America, Leg #3
- "Worms of the Senses / Faculties of the Skull"
- "The Refused Party Program"
- "Liberation Frequency"
- "Rather Be Dead"
- "Coup d'état"
- "Summerholidays vs. Punkroutine"
- "The Deadly Rhythm"
- "Hook, Line and Sinker"
- "Life Support Addiction"
- "Refused Are Fuckin' Dead"
- "The Shape of Punk to Come"

Encore

- "New Noise"
- "Tannhäuser / Derivè"
Europe, Leg #3
- "The Shape of Punk to Come"
- "The Refused Party Program"
- "Liberation Frequency"
- "Rather Be Dead"
- "Coup d'état"
- "Summerholidays vs. Punkroutine"
- "The Deadly Rhythm"
- "Hook, Line and Sinker"
- "Circle Pit"
- "Protest Song '68"
- "Refused Are Fucking Dead"
- "Life Support Addiction"
- "Worms of the Senses / Faculties of the Skull"

Encore

- "New Noise"
- "Tannhäuser / Derivè"
Exel Arena / Final main show / 15 December 2012
- "The Shape of Punk to Come"
- "The Refused Party Program"
- "Liberation Frequency"
- "Rather Be Dead"
- "Coup d'état"
- "Summerholidays vs. Punkroutine"
- "The Deadly Rhythm"
- "Hook, Line and Sinker"
- "Everlasting"
- "Pump the Brakes"
- "Refused Are Fucking Dead"
- "Life Support Addiction"
- "Worms of the Senses / Faculties of the Skull"

Encore

- "New Noise"
- "Tannhäuser / Derivè"
Fabriken / Afterparty show / 15 December 2012
- "Burning Fight (Inside Out cover)"
- "New Direction (Gorilla Biscuits cover)"
- "Re-Fused"
- "Circle Pit"

== Tour dates ==
Date	City	Country	Venue
Warm-up date
29 February 2012	Umeå	Sweden	Scharinska
30 March 2012	Stockholm	Sweden	Debaser Medis
North America, Leg #1
12 April 2012	Pomona	United States	The Glass House
13 April 2012	Indio	United States	Coachella Valley Music and Arts Festival
18 April 2012	San Francisco	United States	The Warfield
20 April 2012	Indio	United States	Coachella Valley Music and Arts Festival
22 April 2012	New York City	United States	Terminal 5
23 April 2012	New York City	United States	Terminal 5
23 April 2012	New York City	United States	The Acheron
Europe, Leg #1
27 April 2012	Berlin	Germany	Monster Bash
28 April 2012	Duisburg	Germany	Telekom Punk Rock Special
29 April 2012	Meerhout	Belgium	Groezrock
31 May 2012	Barcelona	Spain	San Miguel Primavera Sound
1 June 2012	Nuremberg	Germany	Rock im Park
2 June 2012	Nürburg	Germany	Rock am Ring
4 June 2012	Milan	Italy	Fiera Open Air Arena
8 June 2012	Nickelsdorf	Austria	Nova Rock Festival
9 June 2012	Münster	Germany	Vainstream Rockfest
10 June 2012	Donington	England	Download Festival
15 June 2012	Interlaken	Switzerland	Greenfield Festival
16 June 2012	Clisson	France	Hellfest Open Air
1 July 2012	Belfort	France	Eurockéennes de Belfort
5 July 2012	Hradec Králové	Czech Republic	Rock for People
6 July 2012	Turku	Finland	Ruisrock
8 July 2012	Roskilde	Denmark	Roskilde Festival
13 July 2012	Lisbon	Portugal	Optimus Alive!
North America, Leg #2; Support act: Off!
15 July 2012	Atlanta	United States	The Masquerade
16 July 2012	Silver Spring	United States	The Fillmore Silver Spring
18 July 2012	New York City	United States	Williamsburg Park
19 July 2012	Philadelphia	United States	Riot Fest East
20 July 2012	Boston	United States	House of Blues
21 July 2012	Montreal	Canada	Métropolis
22 July 2012	Toronto	Canada	Sound Academy
23 July 2012	Toronto	Canada	Sound Academy
25 July 2012	Royal Oak	United States	Royal Oak Music Theatre
26 July 2012	Chicago	United States	Congress Theater
Asia
29 July 2012	Niigata	Japan	Fuji Rock Festival
Europe, Leg #2
9 August 2012	Gothenburg	Sweden	Way Out West Festival
10 August 2012	Oslo	Norway	Øyafestivalen
12 August 2012	London	England	HMV Forum
13 August 2012	London	England	HMV Forum
14 August 2012	Manchester	England	Manchester Academy
17 August 2012	Biddinghuizen	Netherlands	Lowlands Festival
18 August 2012	Hasselt	Belgium	Pukkelpop
19 August 2012	Leipzig	Germany	Highfield Festival
North America, Leg #3
22 August 2012	Denver	United States	Ogden Theatre
24 August 2012	Calgary	Canada	MacEwan Hall
25 August 2012	Edmonton	Canada	Edmonton Events Centre
26 August 2012	Vancouver	Canada	Vogue Theatre
27 August 2012	Vancouver	Canada	Vogue Theatre
28 August 2012	Seattle	United States	Showbox SoDo
29 August 2012	Portland	United States	Roseland Theater
31 August 2012	Oakland	United States	Fox Oakland Theatre
1 September 2012	Los Angeles	United States	FYF Fest
Europe, Leg #3
29 September 2012	Cologne	Germany	Live Music Hall
30 September 2012	Prague	Czech Republic	Lucerna Music Hall
1 October 2012	Vienna	Austria	Arena
2 October 2012	Munich	Germany	Kesselhaus
4 October 2012	Barcelona	Spain	Razzmatazz
5 October 2012	Madrid	Spain	Riveria
7 October 2012	Bologna	Italy	Estragon
8 October 2012	Zürich	Switzerland	Komplex
9 October 2012	Paris	France	Bataclan
10 October 2012	Esch-sur-Alzette	Luxembourg	Rockhal
11 October 2012	Tilburg	Netherlands	013
North America, Leg #4
2 November 2012	Austin	United States	Auditorium Shores
5 November 2012	Los Angeles	United States	Fonda Theatre
Australia, Leg #1
9 November 2012	Fremantle	Australia	Metropolis Fremantle
11 November 2012	Brisbane	Australia	Eatons Hill Hotel
13 November 2012	Sydney	Australia	Enmore Theatre
15 November 2012	Melbourne	Australia	Palace Theatre
16 November 2012	Melbourne	Australia	Palace Theatre
17 November 2012	Torrensville	Australia	Thebarton Theatre
Europe, Leg #4
6 December 2012	Malmö	Sweden	Kulturbolaget
7 December 2012	Gothenburg	Sweden	Pustervik
8 December 2012	Stockholm	Sweden	Globens Annex
9 December 2012	Oslo	Norway	Sentrum Scene
15 December 2012	Umeå	Sweden	Exel Arena
15 December 2012	Umeå	Sweden	Fabriken

== Support acts ==
- Cerebral Ballzy (22 April 2012)
- Ceremony (23 April 2012)
- Death Grips (12 April 2012)
- Hårda Tider (29 February 2012)
- Les Big Byrd (30 March 2012)
- Off! ( 15–26 July 2012)
- Pettybone ( 12–13 August)
- Sleigh Bells ( 27–31 August 2012)
- The Afghan Whigs (4 June 2012)
- The Bots ( 13–14 August)
- The Bronx (18 April 2012; 22 August 2012; 25 August 2012)
- The Gaslight Anthem (4 June 2012)
- The Hives (18 April 2012)
- U.X. Vileheads (29 February 2012)
- BLKOUT! (9 November 2012)
- Nuclear Summer (11 November 2012)
- Endless Heights (13 November 2012)
- Outright ( 15–16 November 2012)
- Hightime (17 November 2012)

== As a support act ==
- Soundgarden (4 June 2012)

== Personnel ==
- Dennis Lyxzén – lead vocals
- Kristofer Steen – lead guitar, percussion
- Jon Brännström – vocals, rhythm guitar
- Magnus Flagge – bass guitar, cello
- David Sandström – drums, percussion
