= David Sandström (disambiguation) =

David Sandström is a drummer.

David Sandström may also refer to:

- David Sandström (ReGenesis character)

== See also ==
- Sven-David Sandström, Swedish composer
