= Final Exit (band) =

Swedish hardcore band

Background information
- Origin: Umeå, Sweden
- Genre: Hardcore punk
- Years active: 1994–1997, 2007, 2012, 2025
- Labels: Desperate Fight, Monument
- Spinoffs: AC4
- Spinoff of: Step Forward, Refused, Abhinanda
- Past members: David Sandström; Dennis Lyxzén; Kristofer Steen; Pär Hansson; Anders Johansson; Jens Noren

Final Exit was a Swedish straight edge hardcore band from Umeå, formed in 1994. It was a side project made up by members of Refused and Abhinanda and was active from 1994 to 1997.

== History ==
Final Exit formed in 1994 by Dennis Lyxzén (D-Rp), David Sandström (Dave Exit), Pär Hansson (SXE Guile) and Kristoffer Steen (Kid Stone). Unlike most of the band in Umeå at the time Final Exit played a more old-school hardcore influenced by band such as Sick of it All, Youth of Today and Agnostic Front instead of the more metal influenced hardcore sound of the nineties. Final Exit quickly gained a reputation as the members of the band worked on creating a myth about themselves and the Umeå hardcore scene with acts such as naming their first album "Teg" which portrayed the upperclass suburb of Teg as a rough ghetto. The members famous from their other bands took on fake aliases that they used on their records and in interviews where they often bad mouthed their real bands and even themselves. After the release of their second album "Umeå" the band embarked on a last tour in 1997 before splitting up. By then Kristoffer Steen had left the band and been replaced by Anders Johansson a.k.a. "Anders And".

=== Reunion ===
In 2007, Final Exit reunited for one gig at the Umeå open festival to celebrate the 10 year anniversary of the band's break-up. Jens Nordén AKA "Jens Rens" who had played some shows with the band in its last days returned as the drummer. The same year also saw the release of Det Egentliga Västerbotten – Complete Discography 94-97 on CD and, in 2009, the vinyl release included a DVD which contained the last show and some older liveshows caught on tape. The supergroup performed once again in 2012, during the afterparty for Refused's last show, along with Abhinanda.

== Members ==
- David Exit (David Sandström) – vocals (1994–1997, 2007, 2012, 2025)
- D-Rp (Dennis Lyxzén) – bass, backing vocals (1994–1997, 2007, 2012, 2025)
- Anders And – guitar (1997, 2007, 2012)
- Jens Rens – drums (2007, 2012)
- Kid Stone (Kristofer Steen) – guitar (1994–1997)
- SXE Guile (Pär Hansson) – drums (1994–1997, 2025)

== Discography ==
=== Albums ===
- Teg (1995)
- Umeå (1997)

=== Compilations ===
- Too Late for Apologies 7" (1997)
- Det Engentliga Västerbotten – Complete Discography 94–97 (2007, re-released 2009)

=== Appearances on other compilations ===
- Straight Edge as Fuck#1 (1994) – "Mutilated Scumbag"
- Straight Edge as Fuck#2 (1995) – "Sing Along"
- Straight Edge as Fuck#3 (1997) – "Spänningen Släpper"
- In Our Time (1997) – "Fuck You Cowboy"
