= Freedom (Refused album) =

Studio album by Refused
- Released: 29 June 2015
- Recorded: October 2014 – February 2015
- Studio: Seedy Underbelly, Los Angeles; Decibel Studios/mxm Studios, Stockholm
- Genre: Post-hardcore; punk rock; alternative rock
- Length: 43:04
- Label: Epitaph
- Producer: Nick Launay, Shellback, Michael Ilbert

Refused chronology
| The Shape of Punk to Come (1998) | Freedom (2015) | War Music (2019) |

Singles from Freedom
- 1. "Elektra" Released: 27 April 2015; 2. "Françafrique" Released: 26 May 2015; 3. "Dawkins Christ" Released: 11 June 2015

Freedom is the fourth studio album by Swedish hardcore punk band Refused, released via Epitaph Records on 29 June 2015. It is the first album released by the band since 1998's The Shape of Punk to Come, as well as the first album to feature bassist Magnus Flagge as a full-time member since Songs to Fan the Flames of Discontent (1996) and first to not feature guitarist Jon F. Brännström since This Just Might Be... the Truth (1994).

== Background ==
After the band's successful 2012 reunion tour, Refused entered a hiatus for the next two years. However, rumours of a return to touring resurfaced after Jon Brännström posted on the group's Facebook page that he was fired some time in 2013. The band announced later in November 2014 that they would perform in a string of festival dates and tour dates in North America supporting Faith No More. Already two weeks before rumours began to surface of a new album, after ...And You Will Know Us By The Trail Of Dead's Autrey Fulbright II posted a photo on Instagram claiming that Lyxzén had been in the studio recording vocals for the album. The post in question was quickly deleted, however in April 2015 the group announced that they would be releasing a new album in June. The album was produced by Nick Launay, who was known for his work with bands such as Public Image Ltd, Killing Joke and Nick Cave and the Bad Seeds, with two tracks co-written and produced by former Blinded Colony frontman and prolific pop producer Shellback, including lead single "Elektra". Other co-writing credits include "Old Friends / New War" with lyrics inspired by Osip Mandelstam and "Destroy the Man" co-written with Anders Lind.

The band released the track "Elektra" on a "pay what you want" offer, along with pre-orders of the album for donations of over $25, in conjunction with charity Save the Children after the April 2015 Nepal earthquake and subsequent aftershocks. This was followed by the release of "Françafrique" on 26 May, and "Dawkins Christ" by BBC Radio One as the "Hottest Record in the World" on 11 June 2015.

== Reception ==
Professional ratings
Review scores
| Source | Rating |
|---|---|
| AllMusic | 4/5 stars |

The album was included at number 33 on Rock Sound's top 50 releases of 2015 list.

== Track listing ==
All tracks are written by Refused except where noted.

| No. | Title | Lyrics | Music | Length |
|---|---|---|---|---|
| 1. | "Elektra" | | Refused, Shellback | 3:11 |
| 2. | "Old Friends / New War" | Refused, Osip Mandelstam | | 4:26 |
| 3. | "Dawkins Christ" | | | 4:03 |
| 4. | "Françafrique" | | | 4:38 |
| 5. | "Thought Is Blood" | | | 4:17 |
| 6. | "War on the Palaces" | | | 3:34 |
| 7. | "Destroy the Man" | | Refused, Anders Lind | 3:23 |
| 8. | "366" | | Refused, Shellback | 5:19 |
| 9. | "Servants of Death" | | | 3:42 |
| 10. | "Useless Europeans" | | | 6:31 |

== Personnel ==
Refused

- Dennis Lyxzén – lead vocals
- David Sandström – drums
- Kristofer Steen – guitars
- Magnus Flagge – bass guitar

The Françafrique Children's Choir

- Rosie Ford
- Grace Darces-Mannings
- Elisa-Jane Pasfield
- Jack Holman-Brown
- Bianca Fonti
- Hugo Roles

Additional musicians

- Church – additional vocals (tracks 3, 4, 6, 7 and 9)
- Jennifer Goodridge – additional vocals (tracks 3 and 10)
- Brian Grover – additional vocals (tracks 3 and 10)
- Adam "Atom" Greenspan – keyboards, programming (tracks 2 and 9)
- Robert Columbus – percussion (tracks 3 and 4)
- Rasmus Lindelöw – keyboards (tracks 5 and 6)
- Dan Regan – horns (tracks 4 and 6)
- John Christianson – horns (tracks 4 and 6)
- Matt Appleton – horns (tracks 4 and 6)
- Per Nordmark – tambourine (track 7)

Production

- Nick Launay – production, mixing
- Adam "Atom" Greenspan – assistant producer, engineering
- Bernie Grundman – mastering
- Shellback – production (tracks 1 and 8)
- Michael Ilbert – production, engineering, mixing (tracks 1 and 8)
- Nanni Johansson – assistant engineering (tracks 1 and 8)
- Tom Coyne – mastering (tracks 1 and 8)
- Gustav Lindelöw – additional recording
- Jonathon Baker – assistant engineer (The Françafrique Children's Choir)
- Christoffer Berg – additional sound design (tracks 3 and 5)
- Fredrik Söderberg – paintings
- Daniel Andersson – art design

== Charts ==
| Chart (2015) | Peak position |
|---|---|
| Australian Albums (ARIA) | 10 |
| Finnish Albums (Suomen virallinen lista) | 35 |
| German Albums (Offizielle Top 100) | 37 |
| Swedish Albums (Sverigetopplistan) | 2 |
| UK Independent Albums (OCC) | 16 |
| UK Rock & Metal Albums (OCC) | 5 |
| US Billboard 200 | 161 |
| US Top Alternative Albums (Billboard) | 18 |
| US Independent Albums (Billboard) | 10 |
| US Top Rock Albums (Billboard) | 23 |
| US Top Tastemaker Albums (Billboard) | 7 |
