= Reunion Tour =

A reunion tour is a concert tour following the reunion of a band or group.

Reunion Tour may also refer to:

- Bruce Springsteen and the E Street Band Reunion Tour, 1999-2000
- Reunion Tour (Black Sabbath), 2012–2014
- Reunion Tour (Phoebe Bridgers), 2021–2023
- Reunion Tour (The Police), 2007–2008
- The Return of the Spice Girls Tour 2007–2008
- Reunion Tour (Refused), 2012
- Reunion Tour (The Stone Roses), 2012–2013
- Reunion Tour (album), 2007 album by The Weakerthans
- My Chemical Romance Reunion Tour, 2019–2023
- Live '25 Tour, 2025 by Oasis
