= TEXT =

Swedish experimental band

- Origin: Umeå, Sweden
- Genres: Experimental rock; art punk
- Years active: 1998–present
- Labels: Desperate Fight; Demon Box; Buddyhead; Gabel
- Spinoff of: Refused
- Members: Jon F Brännström; Fredrik Bäckström
- Past members: David Sandström; Kristofer Steen

TEXT is a Swedish band founded by Kristofer Steen, David Sandström, Fredrik Bäckström and Jon F Brännström. All, except Bäckström, were ex-members of hardcore band Refused. Stylistically, they have little in common with Refused. Their debut album, Text, is a mix of spoken word, music of various styles, and ambient sound effects, often producing an ethereal, avant-garde sound. Apart from the three "Tableau" tracks (which are one piece, split up across the album), each track could be described as fitting into a different genre. In 2008, a second album, Vital Signs, was released. Yet again the style of music is far from Refused and the first Text album. Only Fredrik Bäckström and Jon F Brännström appear on this album.

The record came out on Demonbox Recordings in Sweden and on Buddyhead in America and the rest of the world. Text was Buddyhead #4 and considered a building block in what is now a very successfully diverse indie-boutique-label run by music journalist Travis Keller. Text announced a US tour the year after the record was released on Buddyhead, but due to conflicts with International Noise Conspiracy tours, it was cancelled.

== Discography ==
- TEXT (2000)
- Sound Is Compressed; Words Rebel and Hiss single (2000)
- Vital Signs (2008)
