= War Music (Refused album) =

Studio album by Refused
- Released: 18 October 2019
- Studios: Sandkvie Studio, Studio Kobra, Patrik's House, Muffin Manor
- Genre: Hardcore punk
- Length: 34:17
- Labels: Spinefarm; Search and Destroy
- Producers: David Sandström, Kristofer Steen

Refused chronology
Freedom (2015)	War Music (2019)

Singles from War Music
- 1. "Blood Red" Released: 2 August 2019; 2. "Rev 001" Released: 13 September 2019; 3. "Economy of Death" Released: 11 October 2019

War Music is the fifth and final studio album by Swedish hardcore punk band Refused. It was released on 18 October 2019 via Spinefarm Records/Search and Destroy Records.

== Background ==
On 26 March 2019, Dennis Lyxzén announced that the band was working on "the record that people wanted us to do last time."

In an interview with BBC 1's Daniel P. Carter, he added, "it’s been one of those, in typical Refused fashion, it’s just been going on for a long time and no one’s enjoying the process of making the record and it’s been kind of grueling. But we’re almost at the finishing line, which feels great. It feels like it’s gonna be a really fantastic record."

The recordings were split in two parts: at first they captured the drum tracks at a studio on Gotland, a small island in the Baltic Sea, before finishing the album at Cobra in Stockholm with producer Martin Ehrencrona (who worked with Tribulation and Viagra Boys).

Drummer David Sandström revealed the details behind the title: "It tells you what to expect going in – this is confrontational, uncompromising, unrelenting music. The drums are at war with the guitars, the guitars are at war with the amps, the songs are at war with time and the lyrics are at war with the times. (...) The title is stolen from a poem from Portsmouth, so there’s that as well."

War Music talks about capitalism and politics, with the band defining it a violent and radical record. Lyxzén explained: "We felt that, now, more than ever, was a time for us to show people our roots and let them know what we think about the world we live in today." The main theme is the idea of starting a revolution against those making money from the suffering of the masses, and to overthrow capitalism.

He added: "We wanted it to be an uncompromising record both thematically in the lyrics, but also in the music and the artwork and everything. Because I think it’s what the world needs. Creatively, it’s also very much a reaction to the Freedom record and how we approached that."

The song "Malfire" is about refugees and linked to the rise of fascism and Nazism across Europe, while "Death In Vännäs" is the most personal track on the record, bringing back memories of the outsider life as young punks in Sweden.

== Release and promotion ==
In May 2019, Refused announced that the album was almost completed and they revealed that they would embark on a European tour with Thrice in October and November. On 2 August 2019, the band released the first single of the album, titled "Blood Red", along with a music video directed by Daniel Gray. The song is "a straight forward declaration of the band’s unwavering political and musical philosophy".

On 13 September 2019, they premiered the single "Rev 001", with a theatrical video where "Lyxzén dances his way towards revolution, battling neo-fascists in a bright cabaret of clarity and full of panache". On 23 September 2019, Refused announced a North American tour, along with METZ and Youth Code, in February and March 2020. On 11 October 2019, the third single "Economy of Death" was revealed, with an exclusive premiere on Spin.

== Critical reception ==
Professional ratings
Aggregate scores
Source	Rating
Metacritic	88/100
Review scores
Source	Rating
AllMusic	4/5 stars
Consequence of Sound	A
DIY	4/5 stars
Hysteria Mag	9/10
Kerrang!	4/5 stars
Kill Your Stereo	75/100
MetalSucks	4/5 stars
NME	5/5 stars

Brian Roesler of Treble liked that the band returned to their hardcore origins, with "brutal and violent passages of raw guitar, neck-breaking percussion, and stop/start trickery between each bridge". However, he pondered whether "that return can be easily heard as a regression" and "While the album takes listeners through myriad well-structured and bombastic pieces—each one layered with a profound confrontational energy backed by a hearty production—the album lacks a fundamental maturity that demarcates what should be expected growth"

Anna Rose of Hysteria Magazine found the album to have "a blurred line between punk and metal (bordering on sludge)" and "a kind of parallel exists between the band’s sketchy history and that of mankind, themes of unity and resistance coursing through traditionally volatile riffs and the occasional ambient reverence leaving a moment for contemplation." Rose wrote that they "pull out every trick from their 28-year arsenal to produce a punk album worthy of our time".

Max Heilman of RIFF Magazine described the album as "like 10 irate letters to everyone that pisses off the band". He wrote that "the album is the sound of punk as we know it, but the fiery radicalism Refused displays is undeniable" and that it was "a hell of a listen for those saddened by the docile nature of modern punk rock." Alex Sievers of Kill Your Stereo wrote that War Music "isn't some perfect new classic" but that it was "at its most basic form, just a solid, politically-charged rock album with some metal undertones and off-kilter riffs coming out the wazoo. And you know what? That’s all it needed to be in order to be good."

Loudwire named it one of the 50 best rock albums of 2019.

== Track listing ==
No.	Title	Length
1.	"Rev 001"	3:10
2.	"Violent Reaction"	4:03
3.	"I Wanna Watch the World Burn"	3:30
4.	"Blood Red"	3:39
5.	"Malfire"	3:01
6.	"Turn the Cross"	3:38
7.	"Damaged III"	3:08
8.	"Death in Vännäs"	3:03
9.	"The Infamous Left"	3:05
10.	"Economy of Death"	4:01
Total length:		34:17

== Personnel ==
War Music personnel as listed in the album liner notes.

Refused

- Dennis Lyxzén – lead vocals
- David Sandström – drums
- Kristofer Steen – guitars
- Magnus Flagge – bass guitar
- Mattias Bärjed – guitars

Additional musicians

- Howlin' Pelle Almqvist – backing vocals (track 6)
- Johan "Shellback" Schuster – backing vocals (track 5)
- Par Nordmark – percussion (tracks 2, 5, 6, 7)
- Martin "Konie" Ehrencrona – synthesizer (tracks 1, 5, 8)
- Pontus Mutka – talkbox (tracks 2, 4)
- Mariam Wallentin – vocals (track 1)

Production

- David Sandström – production, vocal recording (tracks 3, 8)
- Kristofer Steen – production, editing
- Oskar Sandlund – edition, post-production
- Alexander Härnlöv – sound engineer
- Magnus Lindberg – mastering
- Hugo Sundkvist – art direction, design
- Sara Almgren – photography
- Martin "Konie" Ehrencrona – mixing, editing, guitar and bass recording
- Don Alsterberg – rbass and drums recording
- Daniel Ledinsky – vocal recording (tracks 3, 8)
- Patrik Berger – vocal production and recording

== Charts ==
Chart (2019)	Peak position
German Albums (Offizielle Top 100)	40
Swedish Albums (Sverigetopplistan)	26
