= Refused Are Fucking Dead =

2006 documentary film

- Directed by: Kristofer Steen
- Starring: Dennis Lyxzén; Kristofer Steen; Jon Brännström; David Sandström
- Cinematography: Adam Nilsson
- Edited by: Kristofer Steen
- Distributed by: Epitaph Records (worldwide)
- Release dates: 15 April 2006 (Australia); 19 April 2006 (Scandinavia)
- Running time: 38 minutes
- Language: Swedish

Refused Are Fucking Dead is a 2006 documentary about the Swedish hardcore punk band Refused and the then-last year of their career. The film was directed by the band's guitarist, Kristofer Steen. It includes live performances of "Life Support Addiction", "Circlepit", "New Noise", and "Rather Be Dead."

The DVD includes two of Refused's music videos ("Rather Be Dead" and "New Noise") as well as live performances of all the songs on The Shape of Punk to Come (save for "The Apollo Programme Was a Hoax" and "Protest Song '68") as bonus features.

The film shares its name with one of the band's songs on The Shape of Punk to Come and is a reference to a song titled "Born Against Are Fucking Dead" by the New York hardcore band Born Against.
