= Everlasting (EP) =

EP by Refused
- Released: November 1994
- Recorded: July 1994
- Studio: Sunlight Studios, Stockholm
- Genre: Hardcore punk • metallic hardcore
- Length: 22:35
- Label: Startrec (Sweden), We Bite (Germany), Equal Vision (US)
- Producer: Tomas Skogsberg, Fred Estby, Refused

Refused chronology
This Just Might Be... the Truth (1994)	Everlasting (1994)	Songs to Fan the Flames of Discontent (1996)

Professional ratings
Review scores
Source	Rating
Allmusic	3/5 stars

Everlasting is an EP by Swedish hardcore punk band Refused, released in 1994 on Startrec records in Sweden and Equal Vision Records in the United States. The music features a metalcore style. "The Real" was covered by Nasum on its untitled EP.

== Track listing ==
1. "Burn It" – 3:13
2. "Symbols" – 3:41
3. "Sunflower Princess" – 2:00
4. "Everlasting" – 2:29
5. "I Am Not Me" – 3:08
6. "The Real" – 2:34
7. "Pretty Face" – 5:30

== Personnel ==
Band

- Dennis Lyxzén – lead vocals
- Pär Hansson – guitar
- Kristofer Steen – guitar
- Magnus Flagge – bass guitar
- David Sandström – drums, percussion

Production

- Refused – production
- Thomas Skogsberg – production, mixing
- Fred Estby – production, engineer, mixing
- Olé Christiansen – photography
- Ian Richter – design
