= Songs to Fan the Flames of Discontent =

Studio album by Refused
- Released: 7 June 1996
- Recorded: December 1995
- Genre: Hardcore punk
- Length: 30:30
- Labels: Victory (US), Startrec (Sweden), We Bite (Germany)
- Producer: Pelle Gunnerfeldt

Refused chronology
Everlasting (1994)	Songs to Fan the Flames of Discontent (1996)	The E.P. Compilation (1997)

Professional ratings
Review scores
Source	Rating
Allmusic	4/5 stars
Punk News	4.5/5 stars

Songs to Fan the Flames of Discontent is the second full-length album by Swedish hardcore punk band Refused. It was released in 1996 through Victory Records, Startrec and We Bite on CD, tape and 12" vinyl; and reissued by Burning Heart Records and Victory in 1997. A remastered version of the album was released in 2004.

The album is the band's first where Dennis Lyxzén uses screamed vocals as opposed to the shouting vocals he used on the debut This Just Might Be... the Truth and features several metal influences. The techniques, motives and musical ideas found on this album in their rudimentary form developed into what was heard on their next album, The Shape of Punk to Come. The name of the album is taken from an early edition of the Little Red Songbook published by a committee of Spokane, Washington locals of the Industrial Workers of the World in 1909, which included songs by Sweden-born IWW activist Joe Hill.

== Track listing ==
No.	Title	Length
1.	"Rather Be Dead"	3:14
2.	"Coup D'Etat"	2:40
3.	"Hook, Line and Sinker"	2:44
4.	"Return to the Closet"	3:49
5.	"Life Support Addiction"	2:27
6.	"It's Not O.K..."	1:02
7.	"Crusader of Hopelessness"	2:50
8.	"Worthless is the Freedom Bought..."	1:32
9.	"This Trust Will Kill Again"	2:22
10.	"Beauty"	2:30
11.	"Last Minute Pointer"	2:55
12.	"The Slayer"	2:16
Total length:		30:30

== Personnel ==
Refused

- Dennis Lyxzén – vocals
- Kristofer Steen – guitar, bass guitar
- Jon Brännström – guitar
- David Sandström – drums
- Magnus Björklund – bass guitar

Production

- Eskil Lövström – recording, intro on "Rather Be Dead"
- Pelle Henricsson – recording
- Pelle Gunnerfeldt – production
- D. Erixon – Cover Graphics
- Eilert Andersson – Band photo
- Published by Startrec Music/Songs and Stories Publishing
