= Step Forward =

Swedish rock band

- Origin: Umeå, Sweden
- Genres: Hardcore punk
- Years active: 1989–1991, 1993
- Labels: Desperate Fight Records, Umeå Hardcore Records
- Spinoffs: Final Exit, Refused
- Spinoff of: Afro Jetz
- Past members: Dennis Lyxzén; Henrik Jansson; Jens Nordén; Toft Stade; Jonas Söderman; David Sandström

Step Forward was a Swedish hardcore punk band founded in 1989 in Umeå, Sweden by Dennis Lyxzén and Jens Nordén (after Afro Jetz breakup) with his skater friends, Toft Stade and Jonas Söderman. Step Forward was one of the first hardcore punk bands in Sweden that held on to the American straight edge lifestyle.

They soon released their first demo "I Am Me" and in October 1990, their second demo, "Does It Make a Difference". During their existence they played a handful of gigs, mostly in the north of Sweden where they are from.

Differences of opinion on the kind of songs they wanted to play finally reached a point of no return and Step Forward was dissolved. They played their last gig in December 1991.

In 1996, a Step Forward CD entitled It Did Make a Difference was released on the hardcore label Desperate Fight Records. It included the demo-recordings mentioned above as well as two of their live-sets. Although the band no longer exists, Dennis Lyxzén created a new band, Refused, in 1992, which has revolutionized hardcore punk in Sweden and around the world. Jens Nordén has since played in somewhat notable bands as well, such as Regulations, The Vectors, E.T.A. - and along with Lyxzén, the last lineup of Refused side project Final Exit. In 2008 Nordén and Lyxzén teamed up with Karl Backman, The Vectors, and David Sandström, ex-Refused, to form a new hardcore band called AC4.

== Members ==
- Dennis Lyxzén – vocals (1989–1991, 1993)
- Jonas Söderman – guitar (1989–1990)
- Henrik Jansson – guitar (1990–1991, 1993)
- Toft Stade – bass guitar (1989–1991)
- Jens Nordén – drums (1989–1991)
- David Sandström – drums (1991, 1993)

== Discography ==
- I Am Me tape (1990, Umeå Hardcore Records)
- Does It Make A Difference tape (1990, Umeå Hardcore Records)
- Does It Make A Difference + I Am Me tape compilation (1990, Umeå Hardcore Records)
- It Did Make a Difference CD compilation (1996, Desperate Fight Records)
- Demos 1989-1990 12" (2020, Refuse Records)
