= AC4 (band) =

Swedish hardcore punk band

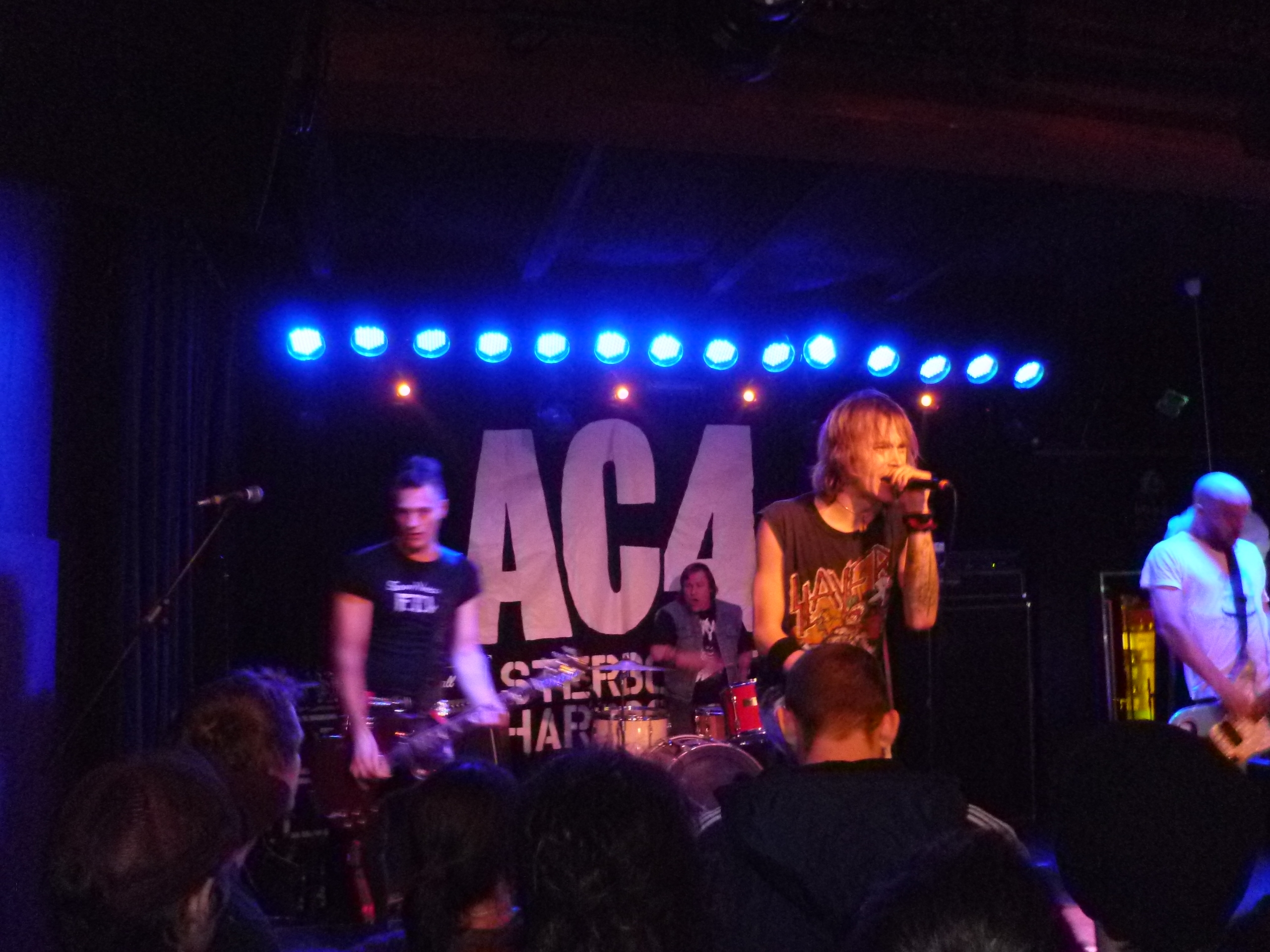
- AC4 live in Saarbrücken

Background information
- Origin: Umeå, Sweden
- Genre: Hardcore punk
- Years active: 2008–2013
- Labels: Ny Våg, Deathwish Inc., Shock
- Spinoff of: Step Forward, Refused, Final Exit
- Past members: Dennis Lyxzén; Karl Backman; Christoffer Röstlund Jonsson; Fredrik Lyxzén; David Sandström; Jens Nordén
- Website: Official AC4 Facebook

AC4 was a Swedish hardcore punk band from Umeå. Refused members Dennis Lyxzén and David Sandström had been talking about starting a new band for a long time. In the spring of 2008 Karl Backman had written songs for the new band and they started to rehearse. Jens Nordén had played with Lyxzén in pre-Refused straight edge hardcore band Step Forward (1987–1991) and since 1990 with Backman in punk band The Vectors. The "AC" in the name is the regional code for the Västerbotten province where Umeå is located.

The first show was at a squat on Parkgatan in Umeå on 5 May 2008.

In May 2008 someone posted a live song on YouTube. It got on Kerrang's playlist and had over 14,000 hits the first week.

They performed at Storsjöyran and Umeå Punkfest in 2008.

In 2009 they performed at Way Out West Festival and released the self-titled debut album on Lyxzén's label Ny Våg.

In 2010 their European tour took them around their native Sweden, as well as Norway, Denmark, Germany, Belgium, Austria, France, Italy, England and Wales. They also released the Umeå Hardcore 7-inch EP in Europe, a special 7-inch for Australia only and the debut album came out in America.

AC4 initially refused to do interviews with mainstream media and would only answer questions from fanzine writers who were under the age of 18. To promote their Australian tour in April 2011, Dennis conducted a number of interviews with the local press, including Melbourne radio show Bullying The Jukebox.

While on tour in Australia a short documentary film about the band entitled "A few minutes with AC4" was filmed, along with a promotional video for the song "Won't Bow Down" from their debut album.

In May 2012 the band announced that Sandström had been replaced by Christoffer Röstlund Jonsson (DS-13) and that the recording of a second album had begun. The album Burn The World was released in March 2013 on Ny Våg records and Deathwish Inc.

The band is also performing at some upcoming festivals including Groezrock on a spring 2013 tour. A week before the tour the band announced that Nordén had suddenly left AC4, but is being replaced by their producer Fredrik Lyxzén.

AC4 disbanded 2013.

== Members ==
- Dennis Lyxzén – lead vocals (2008–2013)
- Karl Backman – guitars, backing vocals (2008–2013)
- David Sandström – bass, backing vocals (2008–2012)
- Christoffer Röstlund Jonsson – bass, backing vocals (2012–2013)
- Jens Nordén – drums (2008–2013)
- Fredrik Lyxzén – drums (2013)
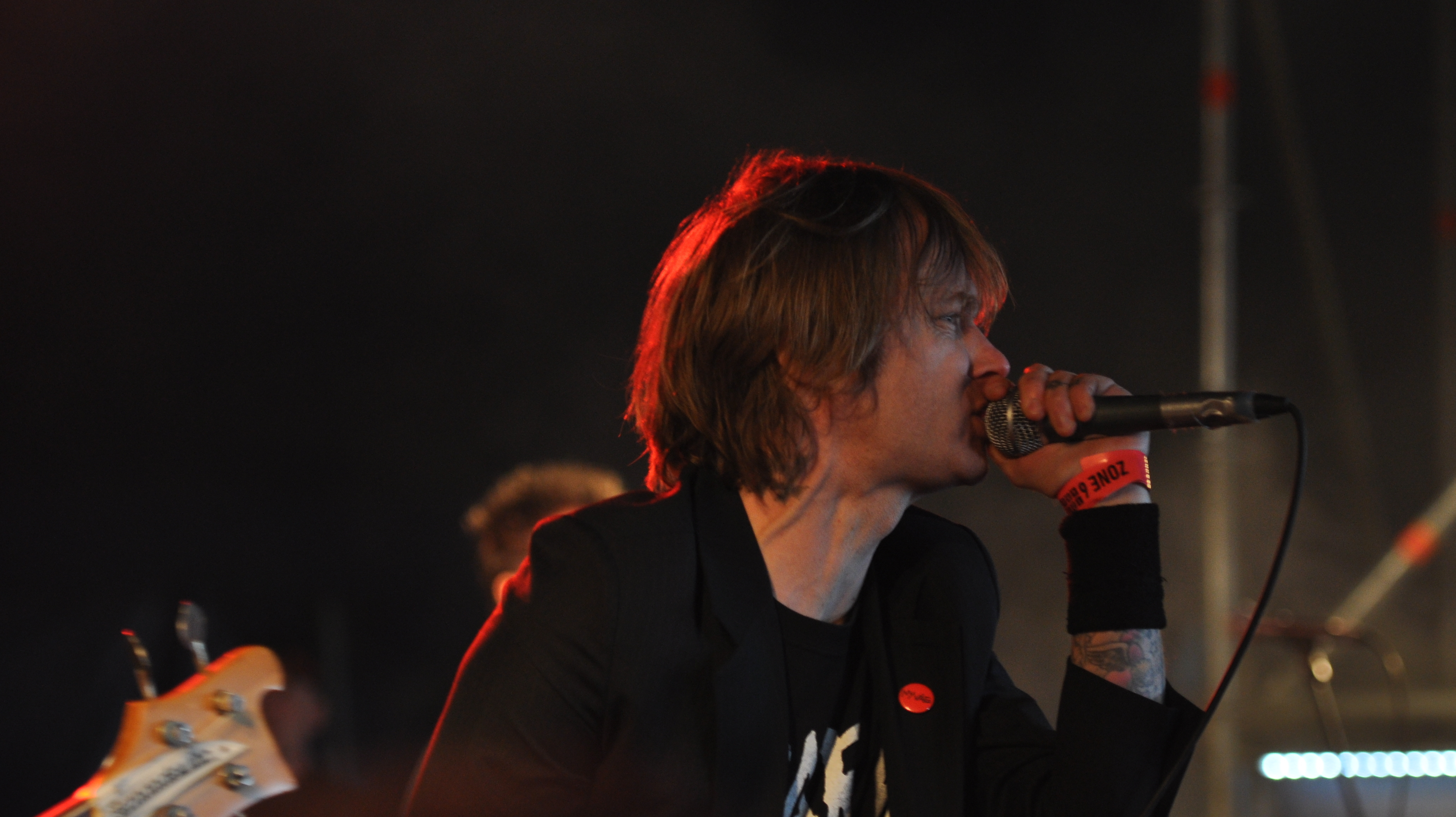
Dennis Lyxzén

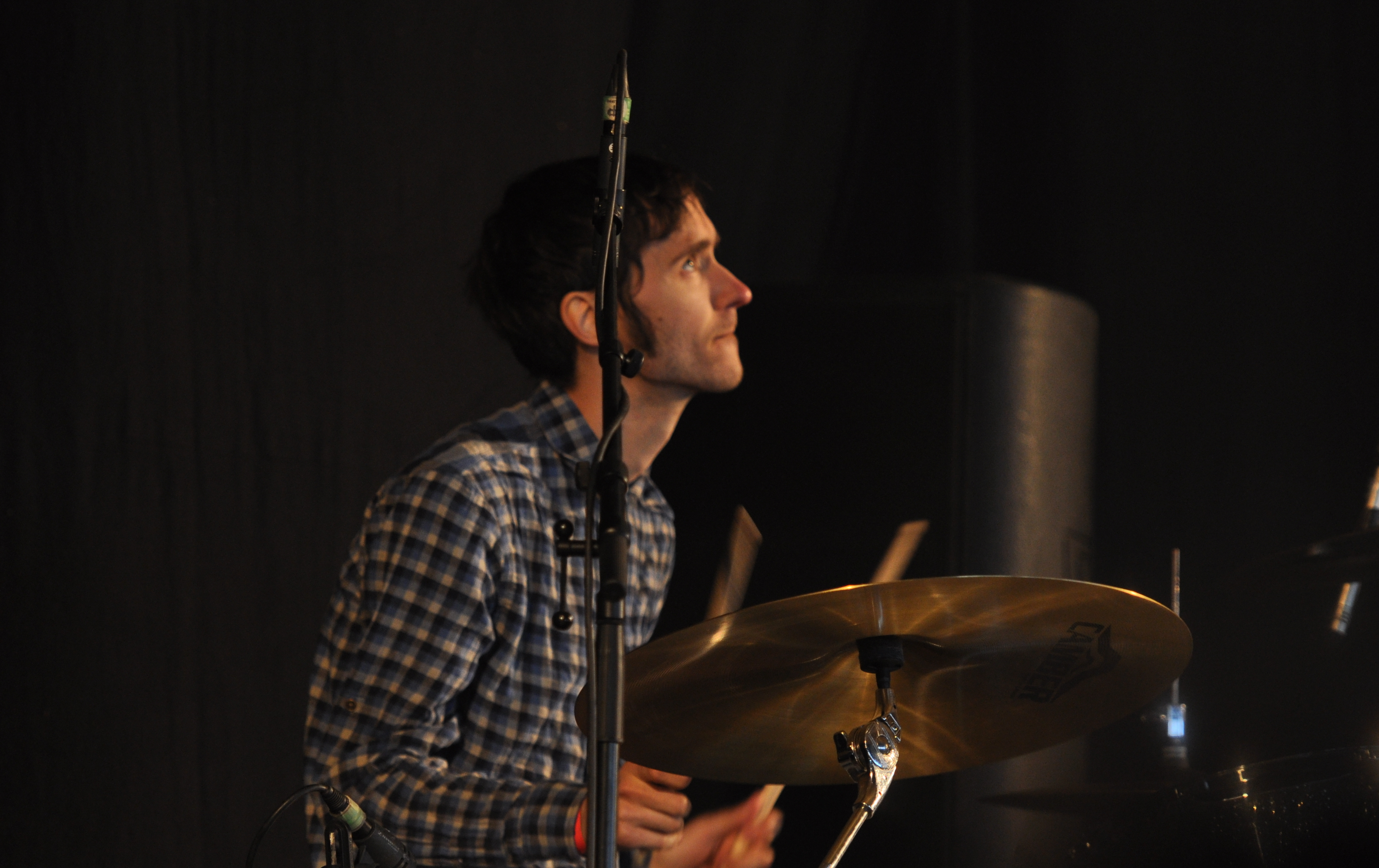
Fredrik Lyxzén

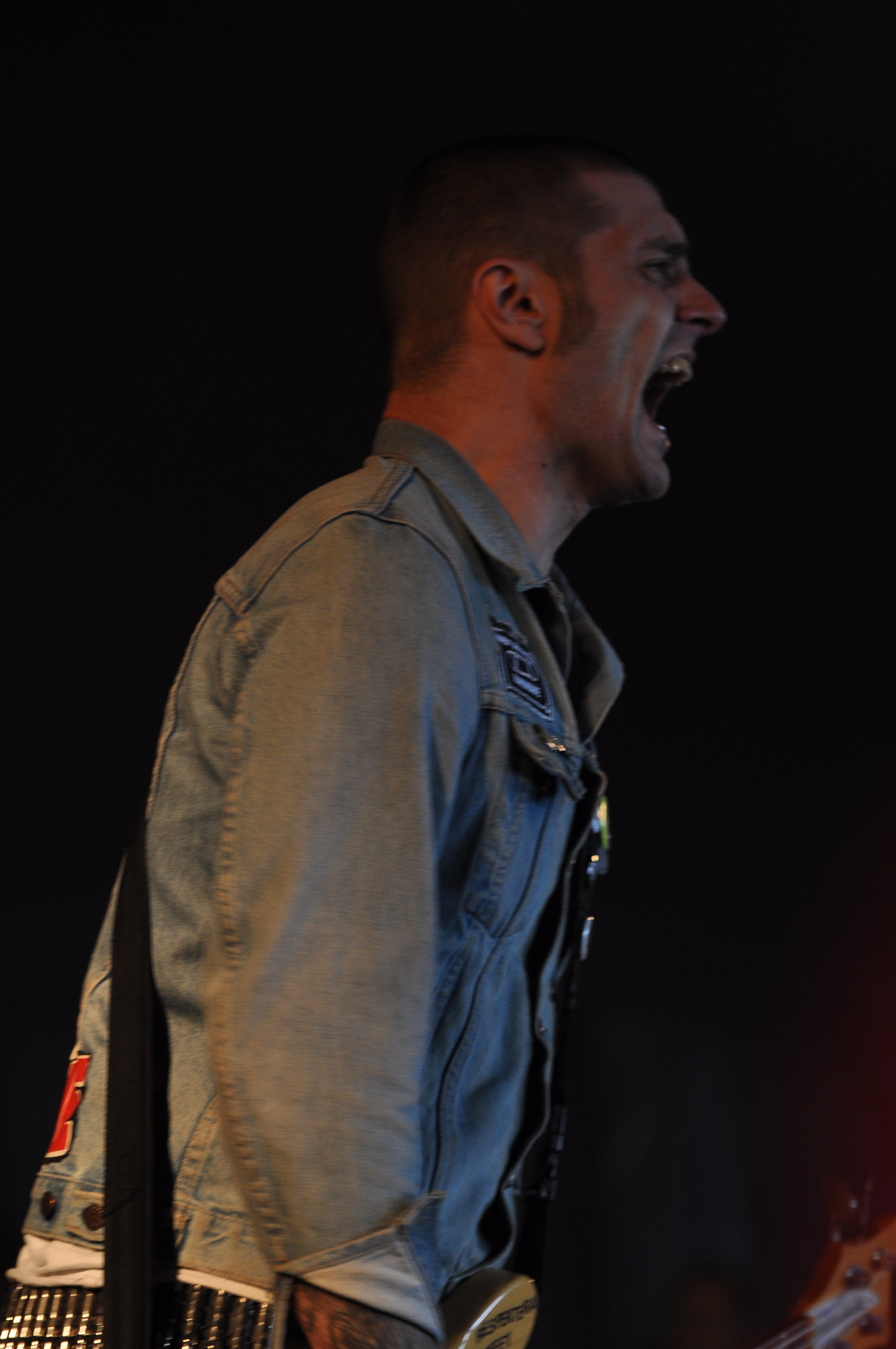
Christoffer Röstlund Jonsson

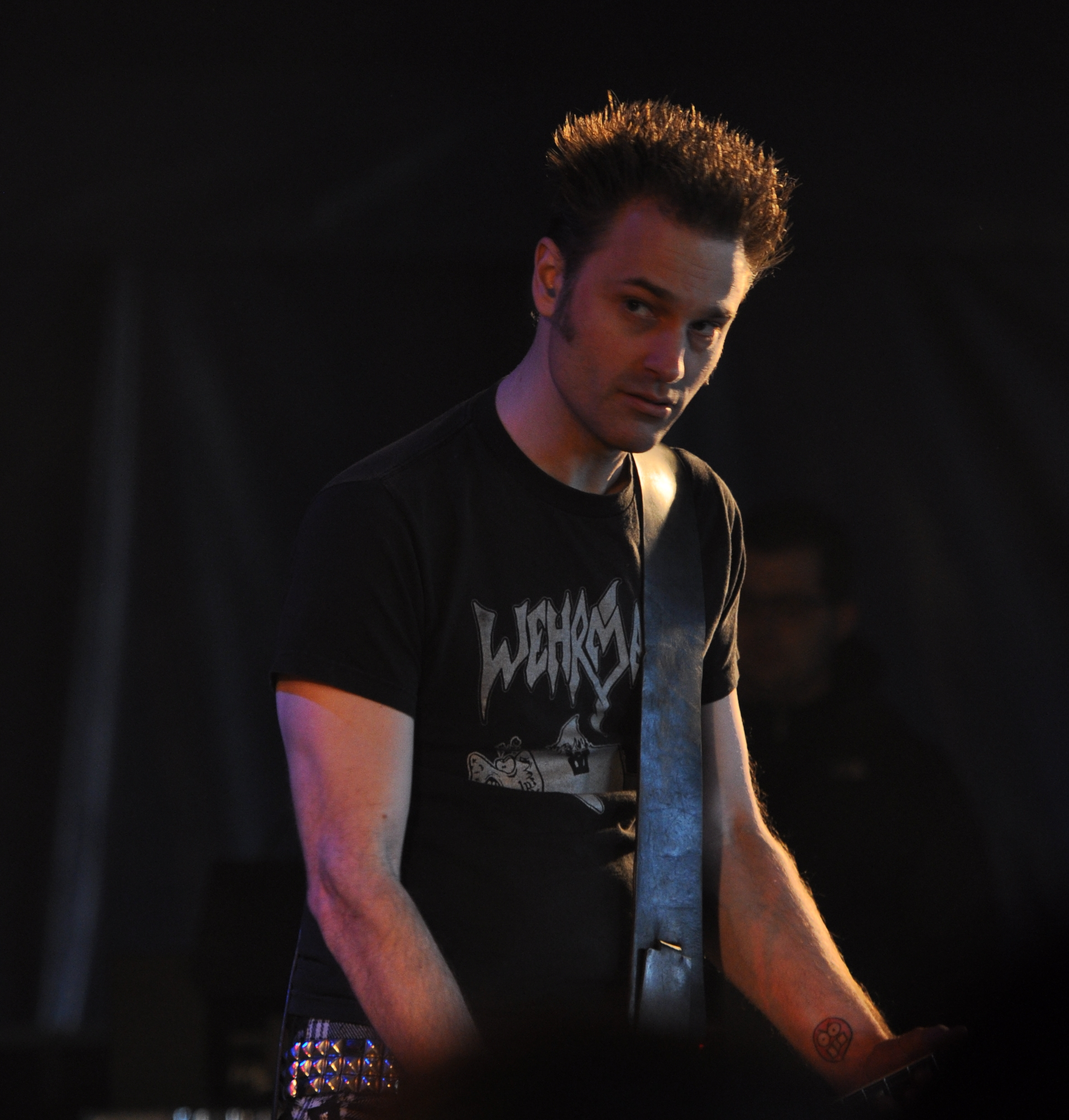
Karl Backman

== Discography ==
=== Albums ===
- AC4
  - CD/LP Ny Våg (Ny Våg No. 123), Sweden 2009
  - LP Deranged Records (DY#161), Canada 2010
  - CD Shock Entertainment (CTX611CD), Australia 2011
- Burn the World
  - CD/LP Ny Våg records (Ny Våg No. 133), Sweden 2013
  - LP Deathwish Inc. (DW145), USA 2013
- Red Horse
  - Streaming single (Ny Våg records), 2026

=== EPs ===
- split 7-inch w/ Surprise Sex Attack
  - 7" Aniseed records (Aniseed 001) 2010
- Umeå Hardcore
  - 7" P-Trash records (p.trash62) 2010

=== Compilations ===
- Umeå Vråljazz Giganter
  - CD/LP Ny Våg records (Ny Våg No. 120) 2010

=== Music videos ===
- "Curva del Diablo" (2013)
- "Burn the World" (2013)
