= The Shape of Punk to Come =

Studio album by Refused
- Released: 27 October 1998
- Recorded: Late 1997
- Studio: Tonteknik Bomba Je Studios
- Genres: Hardcore punk; post-hardcore
- Length: 55:11
- Label: Burning Heart
- Producers: Eskil Lövström; Andreas Nilsson; Pelle Henricsson; Refused

Refused chronology
The Demo Compilation (1997)	The Shape of Punk to Come (1998)	Freedom (2015)

Singles from The Shape of Punk to Come
- 1. "New Noise" Released: 1998

The Shape of Punk to Come: A Chimerical Bombination in 12 Bursts, often shortened to The Shape of Punk to Come, is the third album by Swedish hardcore punk band Refused, released on 27 October 1998 through Burning Heart Records. The album continues the band's evolution from strictly punk to more experimental influences, begun on their previous album, Songs to Fan the Flames of Discontent.

The album received mixed reviews from critics and fans alike upon release, and the band would break up only a few months after the album's release. However, since then, The Shape of Punk to Come has found an audience for the band and largely contributed to their posthumous fame, as well as inspiring many later artists in a wide range of genres. Kerrang! magazine listed The Shape of Punk to Come at No. 13 on their 50 Most Influential Albums of All Time list in 2003.

== Recording ==
In 2006, producer Pelle Henricsson said of the recording:

We did not use Pro Tools at all. The Shape was recorded on 24 track 2 inch tape and occasional Adats in sync when the 24 tracks wasn't enough. The drums were recorded as grooves and then edited in Soundscape without any grid reference. The whole thing was then bounced back to 2 inch where all guitars and basses were recorded. Same thing with vocals but not "every word" moved around. More like keeping phrases that were within the groove. The Soundscape system we used back then held 12 tracks and was used as a stand alone editing unit. Overall the whole recording had groove as THE key word, maybe that's why it's still a cool record!?

The album's production has inspired other artists to work with Pelle Henricsson and Eskil Lövström, including Poison the Well, and Hell is for Heroes.

== Musical style ==
The album has been described musically as post-hardcore, and hardcore punk, with elements of jazz, punk rock, electronica, post-rock, ambient, and heavy metal. The album marked a sharp and conscious departure from Refused's earlier work. The philosophy of the album, expounded in the ample liner notes and encapsulated in the song "New Noise", was that punk and hardcore music could not be anti-establishment by continuing to package revolutionary lyrics in sounds which had been increasingly co-opted into the mainstream. The sound of the record challenged existing punk sensibilities; it can be seen as "punk" at a fundamental level and includes experimental combinations of post-hardcore, post-punk, techno, and jazz sounds.

The album also includes "political interludes" between some songs. The use of more technological sounds or drum and bass music, particularly on The New Noise Theology E.P. which followed the album, is a tactic that various members of Refused have credited to the influence of Philadelphia punk band Ink & Dagger.

== Reception ==
Professional ratings
Review scores
Source	Rating
AllMusic	4.5/5 stars
The A.V. Club	A
Consequence of Sound	5/5 stars
Drowned in Sound	10/10
Mojo	4/5 stars
The New Zealand Herald	5/5 stars
Pitchfork	8.7/10 (1998); 9.4/10 (2010)
Q	4/5 stars
Rock Sound	10/10
The Village Voice	(dud)

Initially, the album was both a commercial and critical failure, with little media coverage and mixed reception from fans and critics alike; some even refused to rate it because of its stylistic divergence. The band went on tour to support the album, a tour described by the band as, " "emotionally devastating" and "an awful experience", which would result in their breakup after only eight shows.

Since then, the album has come to be seen as a landmark post-hardcore album, and received critical acclaim. In 2003, Kerrang! magazine listed The Shape of Punk to Come at No. 13 on their 50 Most Influential Albums of All Time list. In 2005, The Shape of Punk to Come was ranked number 428 in Rock Hard magazine's book The 500 Greatest Rock & Metal Albums of All Time. In 2013, LA Weekly named it the twelfth best punk album in history. In 2015, the Phoenix New Times named it the fifth best political punk album ever.

The album has sold 179,000 copies in the United States as of June 2015.

In 2026 Rolling Stone placed it at 96 on their list of The 100 Greatest Punk Albums of All Time.

== In other media and legacy ==
"New Noise" has been featured in movies such as Crank, Jalla! Jalla!, The Hitman's Bodyguard, Boot Camp, Triangle of Sadness, and Friday Night Lights; in the television programs 24, Rage, The Bear, Criminal Minds, Nitro Circus, The Following, and Wayne; in the video game Tony Hawk's Underground; and in the trailers for the movie Witching and Bitching and the video game Doom. It was also the entrance music for major league pitcher John Axford when he closed games for the Milwaukee Brewers.

The Used, Anthrax, Snot, and Crazy Town have covered "New Noise" on numerous occasions live.

The British magazine Rock Sound gave the album The Shape of Punk to Come the number one spot in the magazine's list of the 100 albums that most influenced the music that Rock Sound covers.

Paramore's song "Born For This" from their 2007 record Riot! features a direct reference to the song "Liberation Frequency" by quoting the lyric "We want the airwaves back." and overlaying it with a modulation of the song's leading melody.

== 2004 reissue ==
In 2004, a DVD-Audio version of the album was released, remixed in 5.1-channel Surround Sound. Many of the songs were compositionally altered, some significantly. "Bruitist Pome #5," for example, was thoroughly reworked, while a seven-minute version of "Refused Are Fuckin Dead" transitions into a new second half, which incorporates elements of the Bomba Je Remix of the song. Other songs received new intros or outros.

== Samples and references ==
- The cover artwork imitates the cover of Teen-Age Dance Session (1994) by Rye Coalition, which is of itself a reference to the cover of Teen-Age Dance Session (1954) by Dan Terry.
- The song title "Worms of the Senses / Faculties of the Skull" is an allusion to a line from Allen Ginsberg's long poem "Howl".
- The transition from "Liberation Frequency" to "The Deadly Rhythm" features a spoken word part taken from an introduction by Bob Garrity for the song "A Night in Tunisia" performed by Charlie Parker, Dizzy Gillespie and Candido Camero on 14 November 1952.
- The opening of “The Deadly Rhythm” also features layered samples of the opening drums, and closing saxophone riff, from a live performance of the same song by Art Blakey and the Jazz Messengers.
- "The Deadly Rhythm" features a musical quotation of Bo Diddley's 1959 R&B song "I'm a Man", or - perhaps more arguably - from the saxophone riff in the Art Blakey version of "Night in Tunisia".
- The break in "New Noise" samples Colonel Kurtz's famous monologue from the 1979 Vietnam war film Apocalypse Now.
- The spoken text at the start of '"Protest Song '68" comes from the opening of the Henry Miller novel Tropic of Cancer.
- The title of the song "Refused are Fucking Dead" is a reference to the Born Against song "Born Against are Fucking Dead".
- The album's title The Shape of Punk to Come and the song of the same name are a reference to Ornette Coleman's 1959 avant-garde jazz album The Shape of Jazz to Come.
- "Tannhäuser / Derivè" includes a reference to the theme "The Augurs of Spring: Dances of the Young Girls" from Igor Stravinsky's The Rite of Spring.

== Track listing ==
No.	Title	Length
1.	"Worms of the Senses/Faculties of the Skull"	7:05
2.	"Liberation Frequency"	4:08
3.	"The Deadly Rhythm"	3:34
4.	"Summerholidays vs. Punkroutine"	4:01
5.	"Bruitist Pome #5"	1:25
6.	"New Noise"	5:08
7.	"The Refused Party Program"	2:38
8.	"Protest Song '68"	4:32
9.	"Refused Are Fuckin' Dead"	5:08
10.	"The Shape of Punk to Come"	5:06
11.	"Tannhäuser/Derivè"	8:07
12.	"The Apollo Program was a Hoax"	4:13

=== 2010 reissue ===
In addition to the 12 tracks of the original release, the 2010 reissue, released as a deluxe edition, also included previously unreleased live recordings from a 1998 concert and a DVD of the documentary on the band, Refused Are Fucking Dead.

=== Disc 2: Live at Umeå Open festival (3 April 1998) ===
1. "The Shape of Punk to Come" – 4:38
2. "The Refused Party Program" – 1:28
3. "Circle Pit" – 2:48
4. "Worms of the Senses / Faculties of the Skull" – 5:31
5. "Hook, Line and Sinker" – 2:51
6. "Summerholidays vs. Punkroutine" – 3:54
7. "Rather Be Dead" – 3:42
8. "Burn It" – 2:33
9. "The Deadly Rhythm" – 4:05
10. "Coup d'Ètat" – 5:10
11. "New Noise" – 4:48
12. "Tannhäuser" – 7:30

== Personnel ==
The Shape of Punk to Come personnel as listed in the album liner notes.

=== Refused ===
- Dennis Lyxzén – vocals, recording, production, mixing, mastering, art direction, layout
- Kristofer Steen – guitars, bass, drums, recording, production, mixing, mastering
- Jon Brännström – samples, programming, synthesizers, guitars, recording, production, mixing, mastering
- David Sandström – drums, melodica, guitars, recording, production, mixing, mastering, photo collage
- Magnus Björklund – bass guitar, cello, recording, production, mixing, mastering

=== Additional contributors ===
- Eskil Lövström – recording, production, mixing, mastering
- Pelle Henricsson – recording, production, mixing, mastering, tambourine
- Andreas Nilsson – sound technician, recording, production, mixing, mastering
- Torbjörn Näsbom – violin
- Jakob Munck – upright bass
- José Saxlund – layout
- Ulf Nybérg – Refused photos
- Axel Stattin – back cover photo
