= Disconvenience =

Swedish band

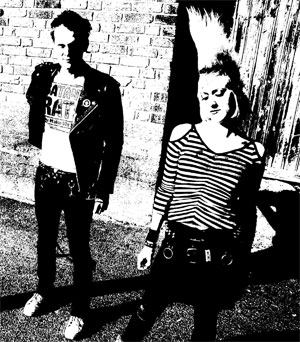

Background information
- Origin: Umeå, Sweden
- Genres: Punk, Rock
- Years active: 2003–2007
- Labels: Limdimma records, CMF, Dirty Faces, Wasted Sounds
- Members: Viktor, Rickard, Emma

Disconvenience was a punk band from Umeå in northern Sweden.

They were scheduled to tour Asia in late 2007.

In 2007, after the breakup of Disconvenience, Rickard and Emma formed the new band Epidemics with Erik Gunnarsson and Patrik Lindmark from the hardcore band The Rats.

== Members ==
- Emma Swanström (bass guitar + vocals)
- Viktor Hariz (drums)
- Rickard Lundberg (guitar)

Former members:

- Nina Lundberg: (drums + backing vocals)

== Discography ==
- War on Wankers EP 2005
- Umeå Punk City LP/CD 2006
