= Abhinanda =

Swedish hardcore punk band

Background information
- Origin: Umeå, Sweden
- Genres: Hardcore punk, post-hardcore
- Years active: 1992–1999, 2004, 2009–2010, 2012, 2022–present
- Labels: Desperate Fight Records, Genet
- Members: José Saxlund; Pär Hansson; Mattias Abrahamsson; Jejo Perković
- Past members: Kristofer Steen; Jonas Lyxzén; Adam Nilsson; Jakob Nyström; Nicklas Rudolfsson; Daniel Berglund

Abhinanda is a Swedish hardcore punk band that was active from 1992 until 1999 (with brief reunions in 2004 and from 2009 to 2010), releasing three albums. The band was part of the Umeå hardcore scene and had close ties to influential hardcore band Refused, which members formed the supergroup Final Exit, which released two albums. All members of the group were straight edge and either vegan or vegetarian.

== History ==
=== Formation, Darkness of Ignorance and early lineup changes ===
The band was formed in 1992 by a group of school friends (José Saxlund, Adam Nilsson, Jonas Lyxzén and Mattias Abrahamson), and began playing local shows and recording demos, taking its name from a lyric in Shelter's debut album. After around a year the group recorded its debut EP, Darkness of Ignorance, released on Saxlund's own record label (run by him and Dennis Lyxzén), Desperate Fight Records. Shortly after the release of this EP, Kristofer Steen joined as a second guitarist, expanding the group to 5 members. In 1993 the band embarked on their first tour, with Refused in Norway. On the way to their last show in Kristiansund, the entourage crashed their two vehicles (a van and a car) and had to finish the journey by taxi.

=== Senseless, Neverending Well of Bliss and Abhinanda ===
In 1994, the group released their debut album, Senseless, via Belgian record label, Genet Records, accompanied by a full European tour with bands such as Refused and Earth Crisis. It is the first (and only) release to feature Steen in the band, as around the same time he had begun performing with Refused, leading to his eventual departure with Pär Hansson joining Abhinanda from Refused, who had left his old band due to "musical differences". Shortly after Hansson's arrival the band released their second EP, Neverending Well of Bliss.

In 1996, Abhinanda release their sophomore self-titled album, also on Genet Records. The album did not feature drummer Jonas Lyxzén (although he did contribute some songwriting), who had left the band to focus on his own project, Separation. Daniel Berglund contributed drums instead. Shortly afterwards, Nilsson left the band too, to be replaced by Nicklas Rudolfsson who performed on the split 7-inch single with Unbroken. A 1998 tour with Randy saw the introduction of keyboardist James Nystrom.

=== The Rumble, breakup and reunions ===
A third and final album, The Rumble, was released that year and featured a more alternative rock sound. After a number of tours across Europe in 1998 and 1999 the group decided to call it a day and focus on other projects, however in 2004 a brief reunion took place. In 2009 the group reformed again and released a new song on their compilation Kizuna as well as touring extensively in Asia, although after touring ended, the band called it quits once more. Saxlund is now involved in the hardcore band Out of Vogue with other musicians of the Umeå hardcore scene, releasing a free EP in 2011 and a full album in 2012. Abhinanda performed once again for the afterparty of Refused's final reunion show, in December 2012, along with Final Exit.

== Members ==
Final lineup

- José Saxlund – vocals (1992–1999, 2004, 2009–2010, 2012, 2022–present)
- Mattias Abrahamson – bass (1992–1999, 2004, 2009–2010, 2012, 2022–present)
- Pär Hansson – guitars (1995–1999, 2004, 2009–2010, 2012, 2022–present)
- Jejo Perković – drums (2022–present)

Former members

- Adam Nilsson – guitars (1992–1997)
- Kristofer Steen – guitars (1993–1994)
- Jonas Lyxzén – drums (1992–1995)
- Jakob Nystrom – keyboards (1998–1999)
- Daniel Berglund – drums (1996–1999, 2004, 2009–2010, 2012)
- Nicklas Rudolfsson – guitars (1997–1999, 2004, 2009–2010, 2012)

== Discography ==
Studio albums

- Senseless (1994)
- Abhinanda (1996)
- The Rumble (1999)

EPs

- Darkness of Ignorance (1993)
- Neverending Well of Bliss (1995)

Splits

- Unbroken / Abhinanda (1998)

Demos

- Ever Increasing Bliss (1992)

Singles

- Junior (1999)
- Tsunami / De Música Ligera (2023)

Compilations

- Kizuna (2009)
