= This Just Might Be... the Truth =

1994 album by Refused

Studio album by Refused
- Released: 1 October 1994
- Recorded: October 1993 at Sunlight Studios, Stockholm
- Genre: Hardcore punk
- Length: 31:12
- Labels: Startrec (Sweden), We Bite (Germany), We Bite America (US)
- Producers: Thomas Skogsberg, Refused

Refused chronology
This Just Might Be... the Truth (1994)	Everlasting (1994)

Professional ratings
Review scores
Source	Rating
Allmusic	4/5 stars

This Just Might Be... the Truth is the first full-length album released by Swedish hardcore punk band Refused.

The album was first released in 1994 through Startrec Records (on tape, CD and 12" vinyl) was reissued by Burning Heart Records (Sweden) and Epitaph Records (US) in 1997. In 2017 and 2018, Startrec reissued a limited edition of the album, both on orange and black vinyl.

== Track listing ==
No.	Title	Length
1.	"Intro"	1:31
2.	"Pump the Brakes"	2:54
3.	"Trickbag"	2:17
4.	"5th Freedom"	3:16
5.	"Untitled"	2:08
6.	"Strength"	3:29
7.	"Our Silence"	2:59
8.	"Dust"	2:48
9.	"Inclination"	2:38
10.	"Mark"	2:50
11.	"Tide"	2:07
12.	"Bottom"	2:15

2025 Startracks edition

Unreleased demo tracks, recorded 10–6–1993.

No.	Title	Length
1.	"Intro + Pump the Brakes"	4:05
2.	"Trickbag"	2:15
3.	"5th Freedom"	3:17
4.	"Strength"	3:16
5.	"Our Silence"	2:58
6.	"Dust"	2:59
7.	"Mark"	2:44
8.	"Bottom"	2:30
9.	"Perception"	2:54
10.	"Ratpack (Sick Of It All cover)"	0:54
11.	"Redemption (Inside Out cover)"	2:08
12.	"Gratitude (Beastie Boys cover)"	2:40
13.	"Live Wire (Mötley Crüe cover)"	3:02

== Personnel ==
- Dennis Lyxzén – lead vocals
- Pär Hansson – guitar
- Henrik Jansson – guitar
- Magnus Flagge – bass guitar
- David Sandström – drums, percussion
- Abhinanda, Shelter, Drift Apart – backing vocals
- Refused – production, backing vocals, layout
- Thomas Skogsberg – production, mixing
- Fred Estby – engineer
