= Desperate Fight Records =

Swedish independent record label

- Founded: 1993
- Founder: Dennis Lyxzén; Jose Saxlund
- Distributor(s): Victory Records; Birdnest Records
- Genre: Straight edge Hardcore punk
- Country of origin: Sweden

Desperate Fight Records was an independent record label in existence between 1993 and 2000 in Umeå, Sweden, owned and operated by Dennis Lyxzén and Jose Saxlund. It released records by most of the bands in the huge local Straight edge hardcore scene, known collectively as Umeå Hardcore.

== Label discography ==
DFR#1: Abhinanda - Darkness of Ignorance
DFR#2: Various artists - Straight Edge as Fuck I
DFR#3: Doughnuts - Equalize Nature
DFR#4: Abhinanda - Senseless
DFR#5: Shield - Build Me Up... Melt Me Down...
DFR#6: Final Exit - Teg
DFR#7: Purusam - Outbound
DFR#8: Abhinanda - Neverending Well of Bliss
DFR#9: Various artists - Straight Edge as Fuck II
DFR#10: Shield - Vampiresongs
DFR#11: Separation - 5th Song
DFR#12: Saidiwas - Saidiwas
DFR#13: Purusam - The Way of the Dying Race
DFR#14: Step Forward - It Did Make a Difference
DFR#15: Final Exit - Umeå
DFR#16: Abhinanda - Abhinanda
DFR#17: Saidiwas - All Punk Cons
DFR#18: Various artists - Straight Edge as Fuck III
DFR#19: Separation - Separationn
DFR#20: Plastic Pride - Daredevil I Lost
DFR#21: Purusam - Daybreak Chronicles
DFR#22: Plastic Pride - No Hot Ashes
DFR#23: Abhinanda - The Rumble
