= Refused =

Swedish punk band

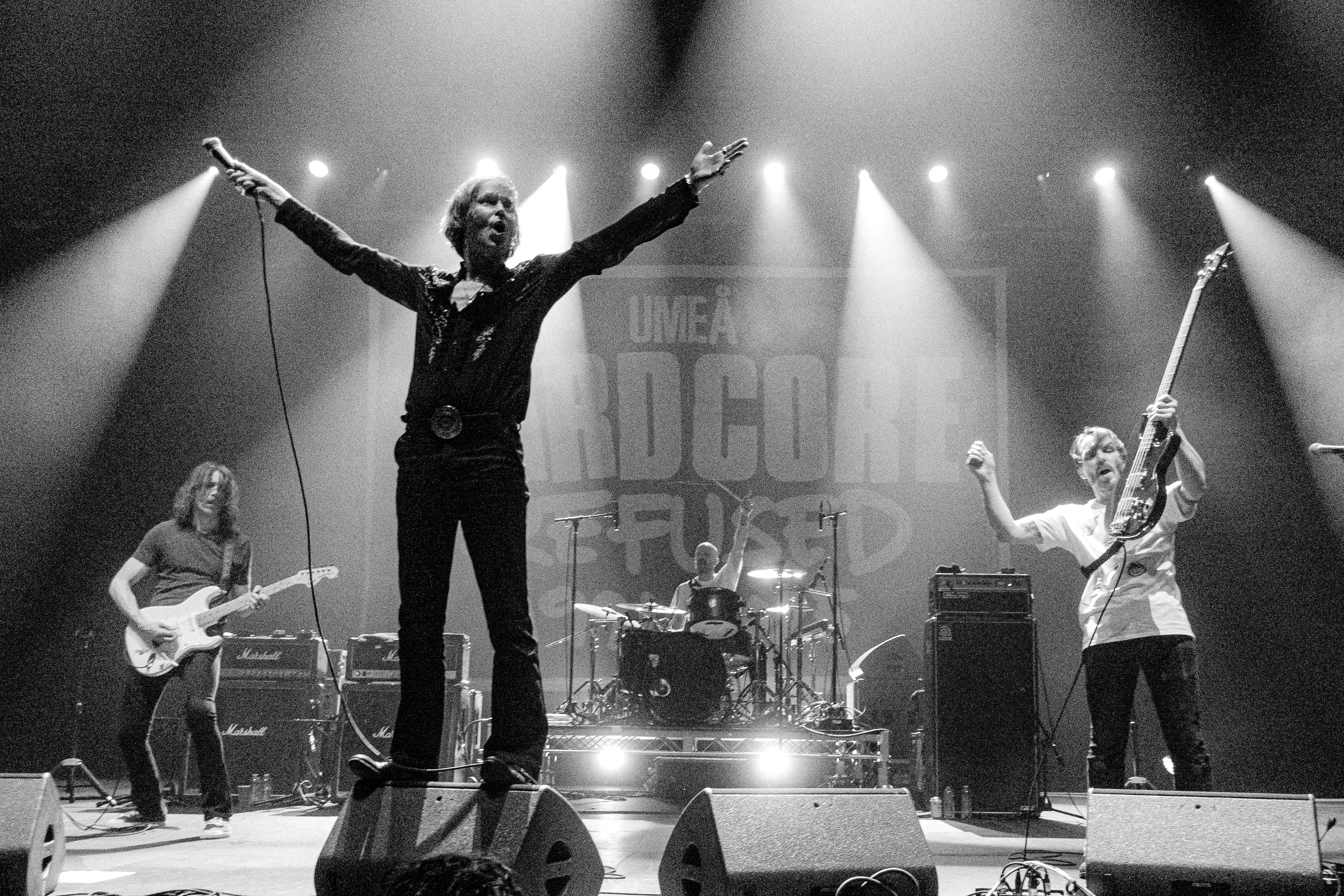
- Refused performing at Shrine Auditorium and Expo Hall in 2025

Background information
- Also known as: The Refused; Samurai (2020)
- Origin: Umeå, Sweden
- Genres: Hardcore punk; post-hardcore; alternative rock
- Years active: 1991–1998; 2012–2025
- Labels: Spinefarm; Search and Destroy; Burning Heart; Epitaph; Victory; Equal Vision; We Bite; Startrec; Umeå Hardcore
- Spinoffs: Final Exit, The (International) Noise Conspiracy, TEXT, INVSN, AC4, Backengrillen
- Spinoff of: Step Forward
- Past members: Dennis Lyxzén; David Sandström; Magnus Flagge; Mattias Bärjed; Jonas Lidgren; Pär Hansson; Henrik Jansson; Jon Brännström; Magnus Höggren; Ulf Nybérg; Kristofer Steen
- Website: officialrefused.com

Refused (also known as the Refused) was a Swedish hardcore punk band originating from Umeå and formed in 1991. Refused's final lineup was composed of vocalist Dennis Lyxzén, guitarist Kristofer Steen, drummer David Sandström, and bassist Magnus Flagge. Guitarist Jon Brännström was a member from 1994, through reunions, until he was fired in 2013. Their lyrics are often of a non-conformist and politically far-left nature and were for a time associated with the straight edge subculture.

The band released their debut album This Just Might Be... the Truth in 1994. They followed this up with Songs to Fan the Flames of Discontent (1996) and five EPs. In 1998, the band released The Shape of Punk to Come, which expanded their sound with jazz and electronic influences, but was initially poorly received commercially and critically. The group disbanded shortly after, during their subsequent tour. Despite limited contemporary success, Refused were influential on the development of rock music in subsequent decades.

In 2012, the band reformed and commenced a reunion tour, and later released further albums Freedom (2015) and War Music (2019). Refused embarked on a farewell tour of North America and Europe in 2025, having played their final show on 21 December 2025 in Umeå.

== History ==
=== Early years (1991–1997) ===
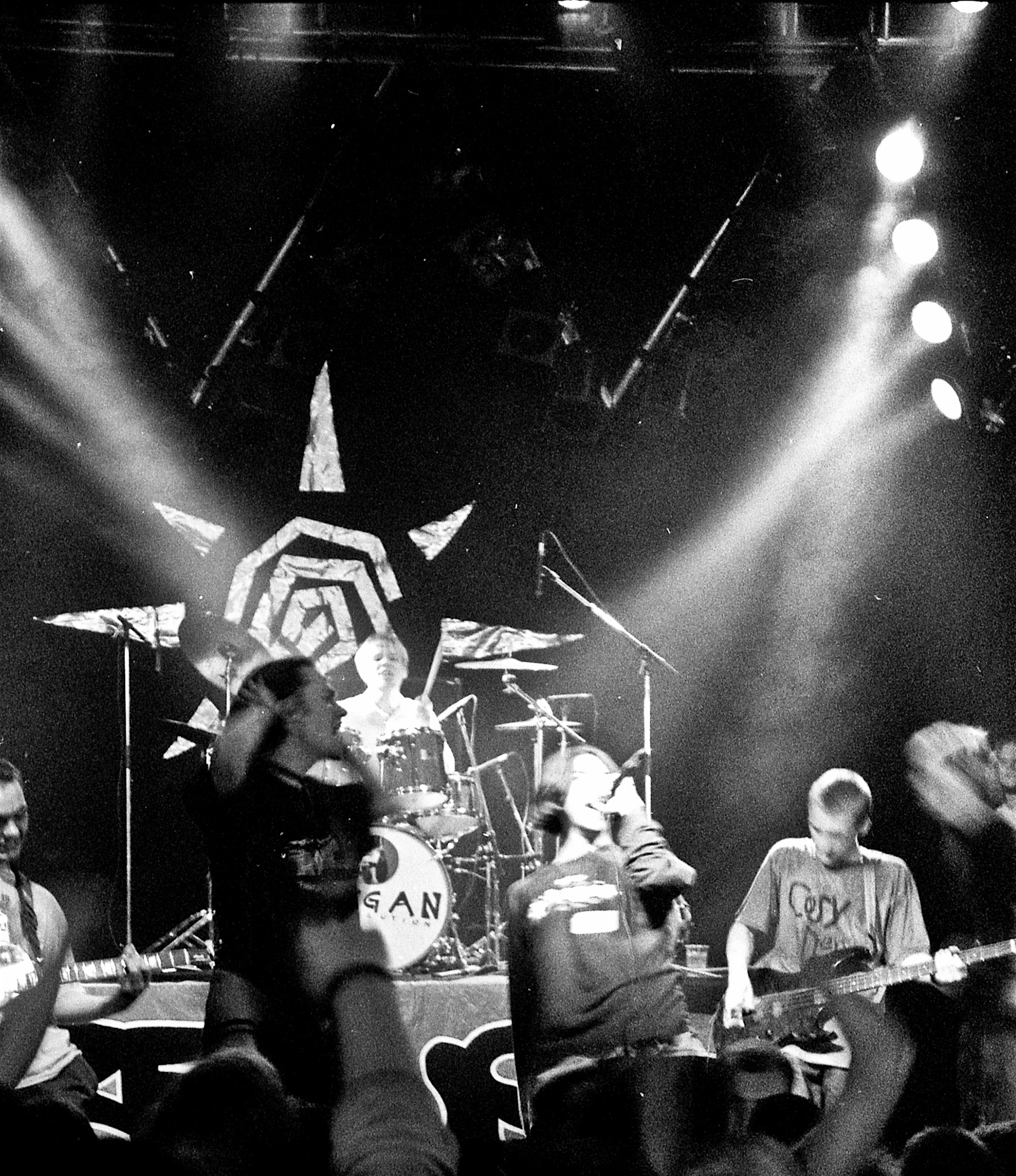
Refused in 1994 at the Hultsfred Festival

Refused formed in early 1991 with Dennis Lyxzén (former frontman of the straight edge band Step Forward) on vocals, David Sandström on drums, Pär Hansson on guitar, and Jonas Lindgren on bass. They formed with the aim of playing outside of their hometown and releasing a 7" record (the latter which never happened). They released their first demo, Refused, the same year. With an already altered lineup (including Kristofer Steen joining from local band Abhinanda with Pär Hansson going the other way) the band released their first studio album, This Just Might Be... the Truth, in 1994. A month later, they released the Everlasting EP.

Refused's final line-up consisted of Dennis Lyxzén, David Sandström, Kristofer Steen, and Jon Brännström, but the band never found a permanent bass player, switching up to 12 bassists until their original break-up. In June 1996, they released Songs to Fan the Flames of Discontent through Victory Records. The album had a style that steered towards the metallic hardcore genre and included a fanzine explaining their political ideas. For this record, they toured with Snapcase. Later on, they did it in support of Millencolin in the United States and with Mindjive in Europe.

=== The Shape of Punk to Come and disbandment (1998) ===
Their third album, 1998's The Shape of Punk to Come, incorporated diverse sounds outside of the strict hardcore realm, such as electronica, jazz, and ambient. Initially, the album was both a commercial and critical failure, with little media coverage and mixed reception from fans and critics alike; some even refused to rate it because of its stylistic divergence.

The United States tour to support the album was cancelled halfway. They were joined by Washington, D.C.'s Frodus and only completed eight shows in half-empty basements and coffeehouses, finishing in a chaotic performance in a basement of Harrisonburg, Virginia that, after four songs, was shut down by police. They described these concerts as "emotionally devastating" and "an awful experience", which finally led to their break-up after a rough internal fight in Atlanta, Georgia. Other factors to their disbandment were a depletion of creative energy and band members wanting different things. There was also conflict between Dennis and the rest of the band.

Refused announced their demise through a strongly worded open letter titled "Refused Are Fucking Dead" on their label Burning Heart's website.

=== After breakup (1999–2009) ===
The story of Refused's last show soon became popular, as well as The Shape of Punk to Come. A year after its release, the album shot up from 1,400 to 21,000 units sold in the United States. In 2000, it went up to 28,000. From then on, many notable artists started to praise the band and newcomers cited them as an influence.

Lead singer Dennis Lyxzén went on to form The (International) Noise Conspiracy soon thereafter, while the other members, as well as venturing into their own projects, formed the group TEXT.

In 2007 Lyxzén and Sandström briefly reformed their Refused side project, Final Exit, which existed in the mid-late 1990s and originally consisted of members of Refused and Abhinanda, with each member taking a different role to that which they had in their main bands (e.g., David on vocals and Dennis on bass guitar).

As of May 2008, Dennis Lyxzén and David Sandström formed a new straightforward hardcore band under the name AC4.

Kristofer Steen moved to Orange County, California and attended film school there. He made a documentary on the band's last year in existence called Refused Are Fucking Dead, which was released in 2006. Then, he began working on operas in Sweden.

=== Rumours (2010–2011) ===
In March 2010, Epitaph Records put up the old Refused website online with the words "Coming Soon." Rumours spread across the Internet about what the new website could indicate, including speculation of a reunion. Citing an anonymous source "close to the situation," Punknews.org unofficially announced that the band would perform at European music festivals in 2010. Dennis Lyxzén denied claims of a Refused reformation as he and David Sandström were busy with AC4. The new band website was later announced to be a promotional site for a reissue of Refused's final album, The Shape of Punk to Come. The reissue, released on 8 June 2010, is a three-disc set with an unreleased live album recorded in 1998 and the Refused Are Fucking Dead DVD documentary in addition to the full original album.

In November 2011, multiple posters said to be for the upcoming 2012 Coachella Festival appeared on several Internet sites, and the line-ups included Refused. This started new rumours of a long-awaited reunion.

=== Reunion, Brännström's firing and Freedom (2012–2017) ===
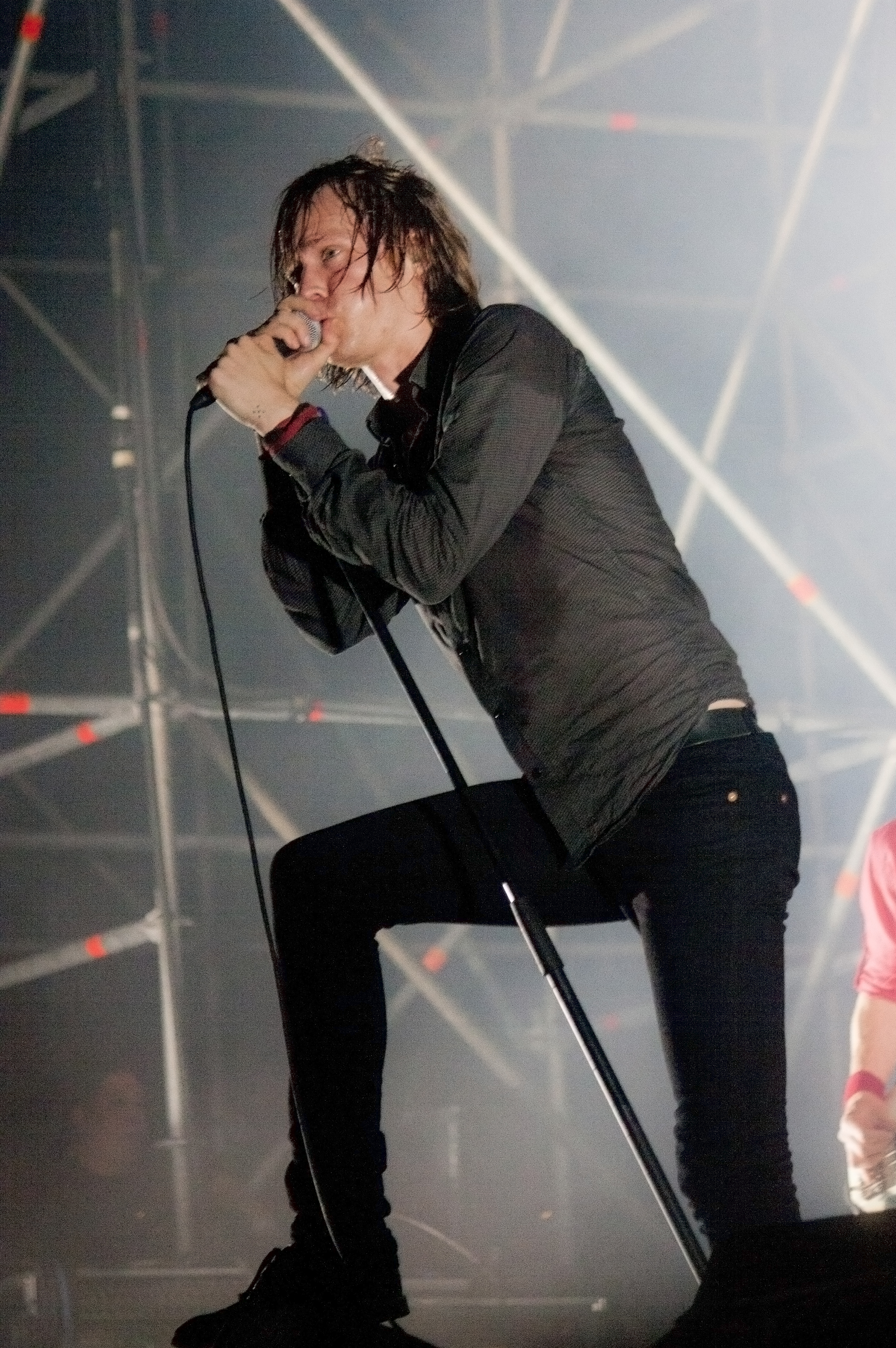
Dennis Lyxzén with Refused in 2012

During BBC Radio 1's "Punk Show" on 2 January 2012, Mike Davies stated that Refused, along with At the Drive-In would be reforming in 2012. On 9 January 2012, Refused announced a reunion to perform at the 2012 Coachella Festival. This was controversial because of the band's original explicit declaration to never reunite.

On 29 February, Refused played a secret show in Umeå, their first live performance since 1998. Refused played numerous European festivals on the Reunion Tour, including Way Out West in Gothenburg, Primavera Sound in Barcelona and Download Festival in England. They appeared for the first time on TV in America on Late Night with Jimmy Fallon on 18 July 2012 and toured Australia for the first time in November. Refused ended the tour on 15 December 2012 with a hometown show in Umeå. Sandström would later say about this tour, "We kept things ambigiuous in our final statement: 'The hatchet is buried … we’re going home', for plausible deniability, because we weren’t sure our attempt at a permanent reunion would fly," also confirming that Refused had only broken up officially once, in 1998.

On 22 February 2013, Refused were awarded the "Special Prize for Music Exports" by the Swedish Minister of Trade. Lyxzén and Sandström chose to criticize Sweden's current government at the ceremony, instead thanking the efforts of popular education, in particular Workers' Educational Association (ABF) and youth centers (in Sweden associated with social democracy) while Jon Brännström chose to not accept the prize on his behalf later stating he wished they "[...] had said no to the prize and instead held a press conference about why we had turned it down".

On 31 October 2014, Jon Brännström wrote on Refused's Facebook page that he was fired from the band and no longer considered them friends. The band responded by stating that they fired him in 2013 "because he did not share our passion for the band."

On 25 November 2014, the band announced their first shows in three years at the Reading and Leeds Festivals, Groezrock and Amnesia Rockfest for summer 2015. They also headlined Punk Rock Bowling in Las Vegas in May 2015. Around the same time, rumours of a new Refused album in 2015 surfaced after ...And You Will Know Us By the Trail of Dead's Autrey Fulbright II posted a photo on Instagram claiming that Lyxzén had been in the studio recording vocals for it.

On 27 April 2015, Refused announced their fourth studio album, Freedom, released on 29 June via Epitaph Records. The album was produced primarily by Nick Launay and featured two songs produced by Shellback. The opening track "Elektra" was released as the lead single.

On 20 November 2017, members of Refused revealed on social media that the band has been in the studio working on their fifth album.

=== Cyberpunk 2077 and War Music (2018–2024) ===
In May 2018, the band released the Servants of Death EP which contained a new song, a b-side and four live songs. It was originally released on vinyl in 2016 as part of Record Store Day.

On 2 July 2019, Polish video game developer CD Projekt Red announced that it would partner with Refused to record new original music for their video game Cyberpunk 2077. Refused's music is performed in the game by the fictional punk rock band Samurai, whose frontman Johnny Silverhand is portrayed by Keanu Reeves. Lyxzén's vocals are used for both Johnny and his bandmate Kerry Eurodyne.

Later that month, Refused announced their fifth album War Music, released on 18 October and supported by the lead single "Blood Red". Alongside the song, the band released a statement stating: "It's been clear for some time: the sun is setting on our beliefs. But we still believe that capitalism is cancer and we still believe it can be cured. We still believe that the patriarchy is cancer and we still believe it too can be cured. We still believe in the power of art to transform and expand the mind. And last but by no means least: We still believe in the total violent obliteration of the one percent."

Refused released The Malignant Fire EP on 20 November 2020, which featured four new songs.

=== Final tour and disbandment (2024–2025) ===
In March 2024, Refused announced their first show in four years, at the Rosendal Garden Party in Stockholm, which was advertised as their "last festival performance in Sweden. Ever". However, it was cancelled the day before because frontman Dennis Lyxzén suffered a cardiac arrest. On 10 September 2024, the band announced a 2025 North American farewell tour alongside a 25th anniversary reissue of The Shape of Punk to Come. This leg of the tour began on 20 March in Washington, D.C. and ended on 8 April in Portland, Oregon.

In May 2025, the band defended their decision to perform at festivals owned by Superstruct Entertainment, following many artists cancelling their festival appearances due to the company being owned by the investment firm KKR. The band explained in a written statement that they went ahead with their performance in order to "be a thorn in the side of Zionists, fascists [and] venture capitalists, and to fan the flames of discontent". The European leg of the band's farewell tour began on 15 June in Berlin and ran until 11 October in Leipzig. In September 2025, Refused announced that their final show would take place on 21 December at the Kulturväven in Umeå. They also simultaneously announced that Lyxzén, Flagge and Sandström would form a new band, Backengrillen, alongside saxophonist Mats Gustafsson. Their self-titled debut album was released in January 2026.

The band performed in Australia that December as part of their farewell, playing at the Good Things music festival alongside Tool, Weezer and Garbage, as well as playing their final headlining show outside of Sweden at Melbourne's Northcote Theatre with Delivery and Baby Mullet. The band then returned to Sweden for their final run of shows. During the band's final Stockholm shows at Fållan, they were joined on stage by Nicke Andersson from The Hellacopters during the first night and Howlin' Pelle Almqvist from The Hives for night two. Each special guest joined the band to perform two songs: A cover of a punk rock song, and a cover of a song originally by the singer's main band. Anderrson's two songs were "Nervous Breakdown" by Black Flag and "(Gotta Get Some Action) Now!" by The Hellacopters, respectively, while Almqvist's two songs were "Where Eagles Dare" by the Misfits and "Hate to Say I Told You So" by The Hives. The band played a 95-minute set at their final-ever show in Umeå, closing on "New Noise".

== Musical style, lyrics, and influences ==
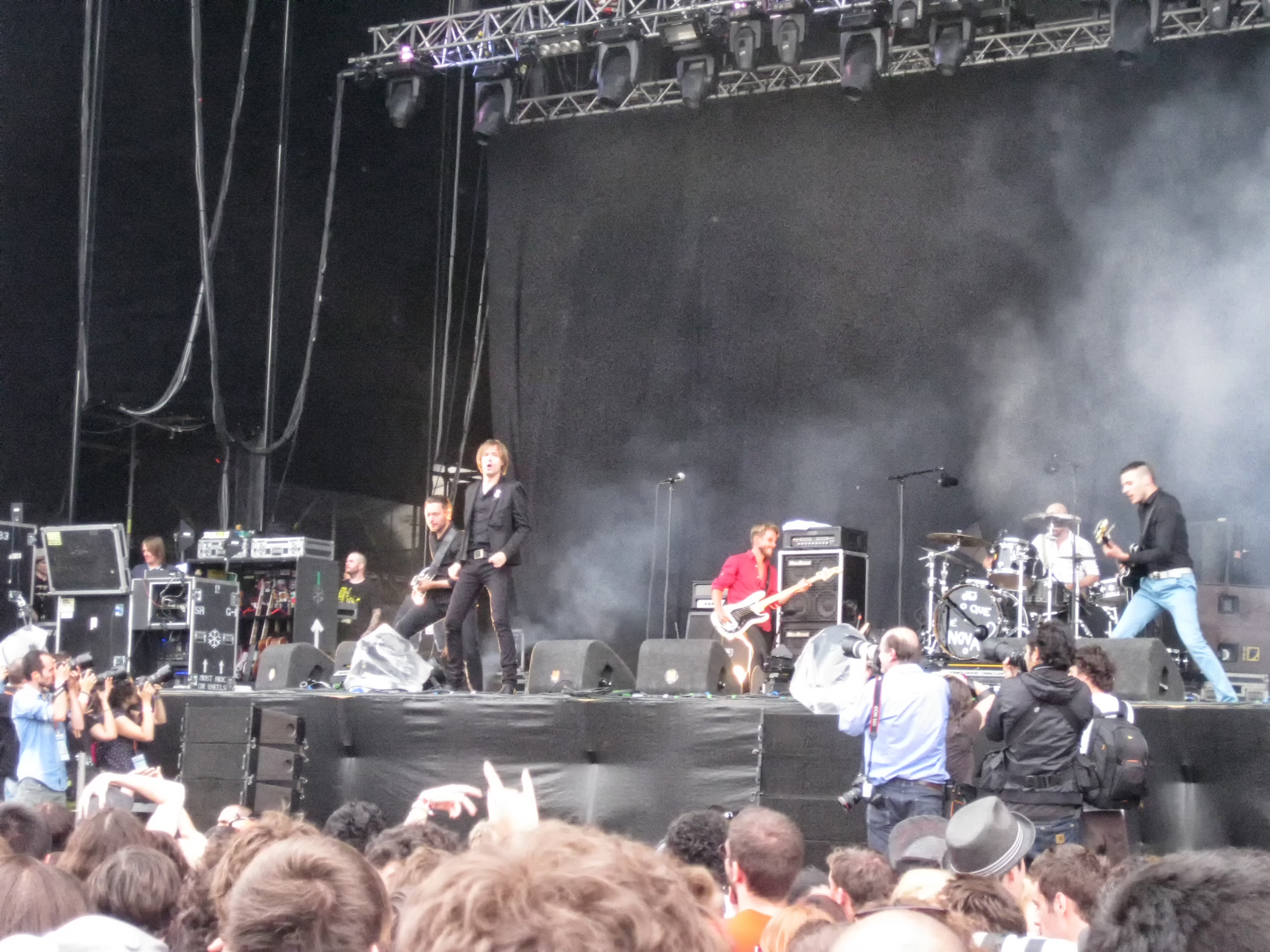
Refused performing in 2012

Refused started as a "fresh-faced positive hardcore band" and their music became increasingly progressive and radical, as did their lyrics. The record This Just Might Be... the Truth was characterized for its "massive hardcore sound", mostly influenced by various bands from the New York hardcore scene (such as Earth Crisis). On their follow-up, Songs to Fan the Flames of Discontent, the band had a heavier, more intricate style, which is generally attributed to their Slayer inspiration, and Lyxzén adopted screaming vocals rather than shouting. With the third album, The Shape of Punk to Come, "came the leap into the unknown" as the band mixed their previous style with unorthodox chord progressions, sampling, "ambient textures, jazz breakdowns", electronica and monologues, and other deviations from the hardcore punk music.

Refused's lyrics focus on far-left politics, drawing on anarchism, socialism, among other ideologies. By the time of their first album, the band already had a strong anti-establishment profile. The group's members were all vegan straight edge until their last show in 1998 and a couple of their songs dealt with these topics. Today, some of them no longer follow these lifestyles. In their live performances, vocalist Lyxzén usually delivers political speeches between songs. Before the Umeå hardcore phenomenon went into full bloom, the band was seen as part of the scene centered around youth-oriented venue Galaxen, along with the punk-rock scene as well as metal bands such as Meshuggah.

Refused have cited bands and artists as influences, including Inside Out, Fugazi, Slayer, Born Against, and ManLiftingBanner. Lyxzén has also cited Ian Svenonius's projects (The Make-Up, The Nation of Ulysses and Cupid Car Club) as personal influences, while Sandström has drawn from Snapcase.

== Legacy ==
Refused profoundly affected the development of rock music at the turn of the twenty-first century, despite the fact that very few people supported them when they were active. According to Vice, they "stood at the nexus of modern punk, incorporating all of its subgenres into one scattered but neat package", putting "the risk back into punk and hardcore by making it unexpected again." David Anthony of The A.V. Club described The Shape of Punk to Come as "an undisputed classic that served as a rallying cry for bands longing to incorporate sounds from outside the walls of aggressive music." Author Gabriel Kuhn states that Refused "became the flagship of a remarkably strong vegan straight edge movement that engulfed Sweden throughout the 1990s" with "witty manifestos" and "performances" that "challenged many of the scene's standards".

Among the artists who cite Refused as an influence are Gallows, Linkin Park, Duff McKagan of Velvet Revolver and Guns N' Roses, Sum 41, Tom DeLonge and Mark Hoppus of Blink-182, AFI, Papa Roach, Tim McIlrath of Rise Against, Underoath, Enter Shikari, the Used, Every Time I Die, Norma Jean, Showbread, La Dispute, Nick Hipa of As I Lay Dying, Derek E. Miller of Poison the Well and Sleigh Bells, Geoff Rickly of Thursday, United Nations and No Devotion, Marcos Curiel of P.O.D. and Daylight Division, Jeremy Bolm of Hesitation Wounds and Touché Amoré, Zachary Garren of Dance Gavin Dance and Strawberry Girls, Chris Teti of the World Is a Beautiful Place & I Am No Longer Afraid to Die, the New Transit Direction, the Bloody Beetroots, Justin Beck of Glassjaw and Sons of Abraham, Robin Staps of the Ocean, the Bled, Thomas Williams of Stray from the Path, Brandon Kellum of American Standards, and Jonathan Boulet. The song "H. Ledger" from letlive.'s album Fake History is a "homage" to Refused because the band felt that they "didn't receive proper recognition until they were no longer active." British musician Frank Turner stated that The Shape of Punk to Come "shaped my musical path as a musician for a long time" and his group, Million Dead, took their name from a line in the Refused's song "The Apollo Programme was a Hoax". Pop punk band Paramore were inspired by the song "Liberation Frequency" and quoted a line of it on their 2007 song "Born for This".

Other artists have been quoted expressing admiration for their work are Anthrax, Steve Aoki, and Ben Weinman of the Dillinger Escape Plan.

== Band members ==
Final line-up

- Dennis Lyxzén — lead vocals (1991–1998, 2012, 2014–2025)
- David Sandström — drums (1991–1998, 2012, 2014–2025); guitar, melodica (1997, in studio)
- Magnus Flagge (formerly Björklund) — bass (1992–1995, 1997, 2012, 2014–2025); cello (1997, in studio)
- Mattias Bärjed — guitar (2019–2025; touring musician 2015–2019)

Former members

- Jonas Lidgren — bass (1991–1992)
- Pär Hansson — guitar (1991–1994)
- Henrik Jansson — guitar (1992–1995)
- Jon Brännström — guitar, backing vocals (1995–1998, 2013); samples, synthesizers, programming (1997, in studio)
- Magnus Höggren — bass (1995–1997; died 2023)
- Ulf Nybérg — bass (1997–1998)
- Kristofer Steen — guitar (1994–1998, 2012, 2014–2020); bass (1994–1997, in studio); drums (1997, in studio)

Former session and touring musicians

- Jesper Sundberg – bass (1994)
- Anders Johansson – bass (1994–1995)
- Jonas "Babyface" Eriksson – bass (1996–1997)
- Håkan-Håkan Strandhag – bass (1997)
- Inge Johansson – bass (1997)
- Andreas Nilsson – bass (1997)
- Don Devore – bass (1998)

== Discography ==
=== Studio albums ===
- This Just Might Be... the Truth (1994)
- Songs to Fan the Flames of Discontent (1996)
- The Shape of Punk to Come (1998)
- Freedom (2015)
- War Music (2019)

== See also ==
- Animal rights and punk subculture

== Bibliography ==
- Kuhn, Gabriel (2010). Sober Living for the Revolution: Hardcore Punk, Straight Edge, and Radical Politics. Oakland: PM Press. ISBN 978-1-60486-051-1.
