= Kristofer Steen =

Swedish musician (born 1974)

- Also known as: Kid Stone
- Born: 26 June 1974 (age 52); Umeå, Sweden
- Genres: Punk rock, indie rock, hardcore punk, post-hardcore
- Occupations: Musician, film director
- Instruments: Guitar, bass, drums
- Years active: 1991–present
- Labels: Burning Heart, Epitaph

Kristofer Steen (born 26 June 1974) is a Swedish musician who was the guitarist for hardcore punk band Refused. He directed Refused Are Fucking Dead, a 2006 documentary charting the demise of Refused in 1998.

After Refused's demise, Steen formed a band called TEXT with fellow Refused guitarist Jon Brännström and Refused drummer David Sandström, as well as embarking upon his own projects. Steen was also involved in the bands Brain Squashed Puppies, Abhinanda and Final Exit. Refused reunited to perform at Coachella 2012.

== Discography ==
=== With Abhinanda ===
- Senseless (1994)

=== With Refused ===
- Everlasting (EP) (1995)
- Songs to Fan the Flames of Discontent (1996)
- The Shape of Punk to Come (1998)
- Freedom (2015)
- War Music (2019)

=== With Final Exit ===
- Teg (1995)
- Umeå (1997)

=== With TEXT ===
- TEXT (1999)
- Vital Signs (2008)
