= Dennis Lyxzén =

Swedish singer (born 1972)

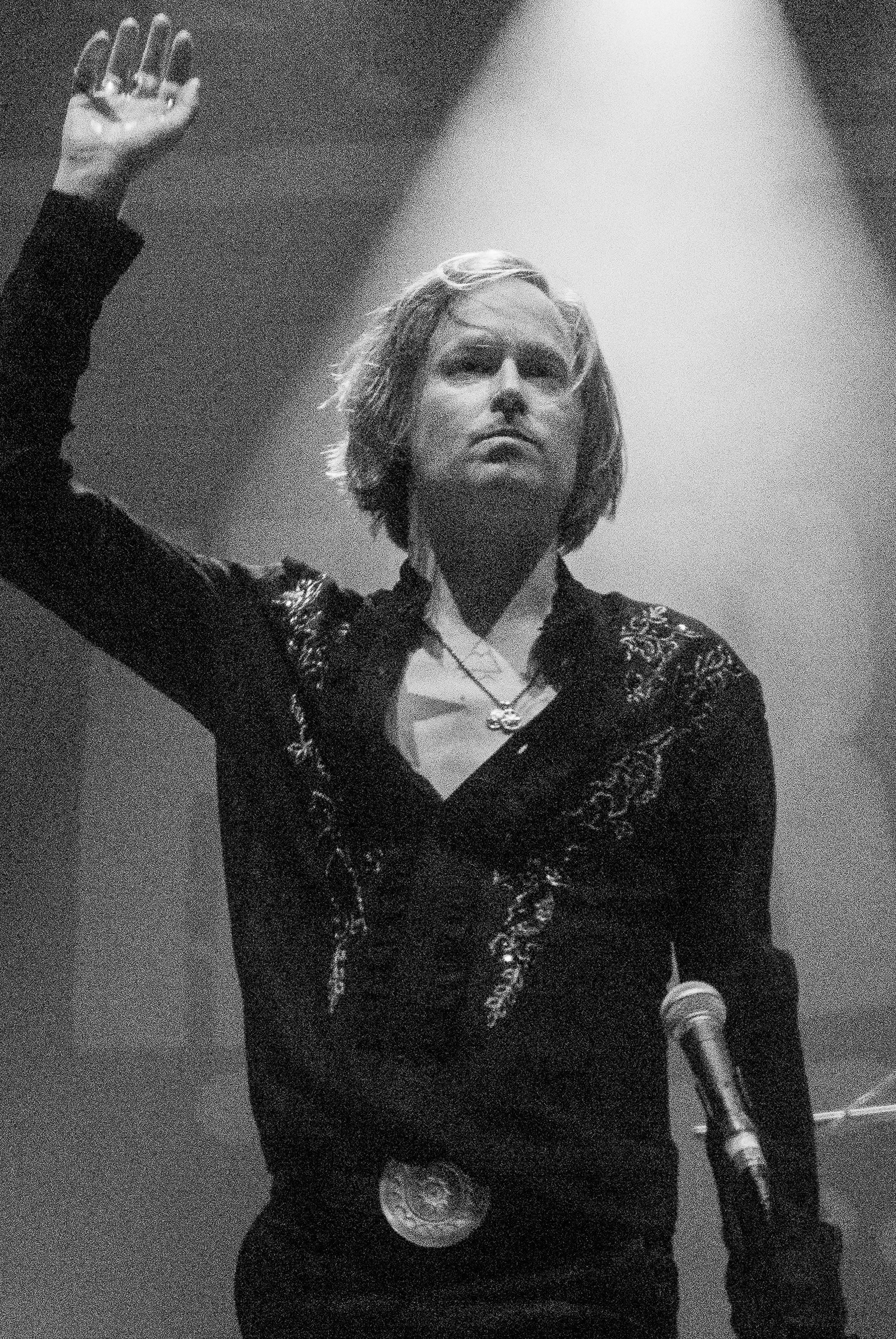
- Lyxzén performing at Shrine Auditorium and Expo Hall in 2025

Background information
- Also known as: D-Rp
- Born: Sven Olov Dennis Lyxzén; 19 June 1972 (age 54); Umeå, Sweden
- Genres: Punk rock; garage rock; indie rock; hardcore punk
- Occupations: Singer; songwriter
- Years active: 1987–present
- Member of: INVSN; Fake Names; Backengrillen; Vännäs Kasino
- Formerly of: Refused; The (International) Noise Conspiracy; AC4; Step Forward; Final Exit; Afro Jetz; Garbage Pailkids; Instängd; 93 Million Miles from the Sun; By No Means

Sven Olov Dennis Lyxzén (born 19 June 1972) is a Swedish singer, best known as the lead vocalist for the influential hardcore punk band Refused, as well as the bands Backengrillen, INVSN and Fake Names. He is also a former member of bands including AC4, Step Forward, Final Exit, and The (International) Noise Conspiracy, and co-founded the record labels Ny Våg and Desperate Fight Records.

== Career ==
=== Refused ===
Following a stint in the short-lived hardcore band Step Forward, Lyxzén formed Refused in 1991 with drummer David Sandström, guitarist Pär Hansson, and bassist Jonas Lindgren. They released three studio albums, This Just Might Be... the Truth (1994), Songs to Fan the Flames of Discontent (1996), and The Shape of Punk to Come (1998), the latter of which was heavily influential on later bands but a commercial and critical failure upon release, and the group disbanded that same year.

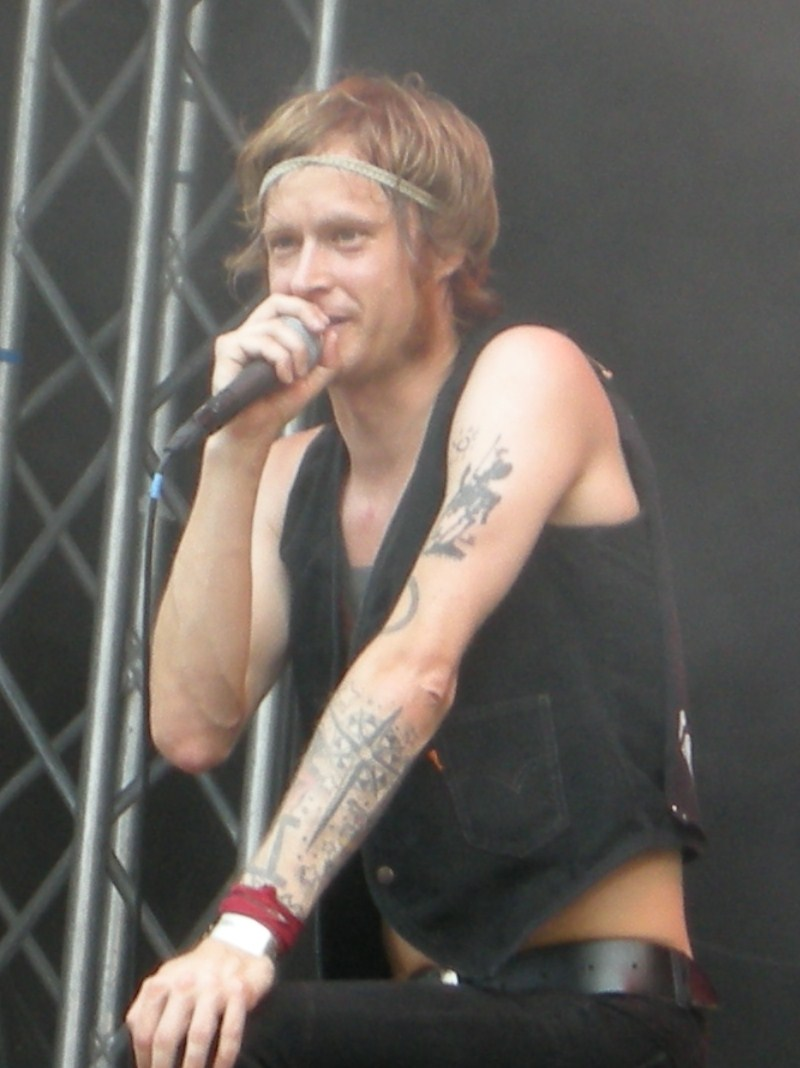
Lyxzén performing in 2009

In March 2010, there were rumours that Refused would be reuniting after a 12 years hiatus, although Lyxzén dismissed the notion as he and Sandström were busy with the band AC4. However, Refused unexpectedly reunited in 2012 for the Refused Reunion Tour, including appearances at Coachella, the Way Out West Festival, the Fun Fun Fun Fest, and Groezrock in Meerhout, Belgium. While the reunion was intended to be temporary, in 2015 the band released a fourth studio album, Freedom, via Epitaph Records. Speaking on the band's future in 2017, Lyxzén said, "We're not breaking up or anything, we're taking a break to write a new record... But the Australian tour will be the last tour for a while... We'll take some time off, and then we'll start writing some songs but we're not breaking up, no."

On 13 June 2024, Lyxzén suffered a heart attack, leading to cancellation of Refused shows in the following weeks.

=== Other work ===
Outside of Refused, Lyxzén has been involved in a number of bands, most notably The (International) Noise Conspiracy, INVSN (previously called The Lost Patrol Band), and Fake Names, the latter a supergroup formed with guitarists Brian Baker (Minor Threat, Bad Religion) and Michael Hampton (Embrace), drummer Matt Schulz (Enon), and bassist Johnny Temple (Girls Against Boys). He also revealed in December 2021 that he had formed a new punk band with INVSN bandmate Sara Almgren, with him on rhythm guitar and Almgren on bass and vocals.

Lyxzén also runs Ny Våg, an independent punk record label he co-founded with former Refused bassist Inge Johansson, and produced the 2005 self-titled album by label signee Regulations. He also co-founded the now-defunct labels Desperate Fight Records and Umeå Hardcore Records.

In 2011, Lyxzén joined Italian electronic act The Bloody Beetroots for their "Church of Noise" tour as a guest vocalist, and was featured on the act's single of the same name.

Lyxzén provided the singing vocals for the character Johnny Silverhand (with Refused portraying the character's band Samurai) in the 2020 video game Cyberpunk 2077. He also provided vocals for the track "Silent No More" from the 2022 game Metal: Hellsinger.

== Public image and personal life ==
As a punk rock frontman, Lyxzén's songs are often of a counterculture nature, in line with his socialist politics, although he has explored a variety of topics in his music.

Lyxzén was voted "Sexiest Man in Sweden" in 2004 by Elle Magazine. He is a vegan, having discovered animal rights around 1989 and adopted the lifestyle in the early 1990s.

== Associated bands ==
=== Current bands ===
- INVSN – lead vocals, guitar (1999–present)
- Fake Names – lead vocals (2018–present)
- Vännäs Kasino – guitar, backing vocals
- Backengrillen – vocals, electronics

=== Former bands ===
- Refused – lead vocals (1991–1998, 2012–2025)
- AC4 – lead vocals (2008–2013)
- Instängd – drums, percussion (2008–2011)
- The (International) Noise Conspiracy – lead vocals (1998–2009)
- 93 Million Miles From the Sun – lead vocals, guitar (1997–1998)
- Final Exit (credited in the band as D-Rp) – bass (1994–1997)
- By No Means – guitar (1992)
- Step Forward – lead vocals (1989–1991)
- Garbage Pailkids – bass (1989–1991)
- Afro Jetz – lead vocals, bass (1987–1989)
- Yonderboy

== Selected discography ==
=== Refused ===
- This Just Might Be... the Truth (1994)
- Songs to Fan the Flames of Discontent (1996)
- The Shape of Punk to Come (1998)
- Freedom (2015)
- War Music (2019)

=== INVSN ===
As The Lost Patrol:

- Songs in the Key of Resistance (1999)
- Songs About Running Away (2003)

As The Lost Patrol Band:

- The Lost Patrol Band (2005)
- Automatic (2006)

As Invasionen:

- Hela Världen Brinner (2010)
- Saker Som Jag Sagt Till Natten (2011)

As INVSN:

- INVSN (2013)
- The Beautiful Stories (2017)
- Let The Night Love You (2022)

=== AC4 ===
- AC4 (2009)
- Burn the World (2013)

=== The (International) Noise Conspiracy ===
- The First Conspiracy (1999)
- Survival Sickness (2000)
- A New Morning, Changing Weather (2001)
- Armed Love (2004)
- The Cross of My Calling (2008)

=== Final Exit ===
- Teg (1995)
- Umeå (1997)

=== Step Forward ===
- I Am Me (1990)
- Does It Make A Difference (1990)
- It Did Make a Difference (1996)

=== Fake Names ===
- Fake Names (2020)
- Fake Names EP (2021)
- Expendables (2023)

=== Instängd ===
- Mitt Svar På Ingenting EP (2007)
- Konkret Och Brutal EP (2008)
- Drag Utan Drog EP (2011)

=== 93 Million Miles ===
- 93 Million Miles (2003)

=== By No Means ===
- Straight (1992)

=== Garbage Pailkids ===
- Garbage Pailkids (1990)
- Pailkids on the Block (1991)

=== Other credits ===
Year	Artist	Album	Role
1991	Skümback	Vi Är Nöjda.....	Backing vocals on "Do"
1995	Stoned	Music for the Morons	Vocals on "The Trooper"
2005	Regulations	Regulations	Co-producer with Regulations
2006	Disconvenience	Umeå Punk City	Backing vocals, tambourine
2007	Paramore	Riot!	Writing credit on "Born For This", which quotes Refused's "Liberation Frequency"
2008	P.K. 14	City Weather Sailing	Backing vocals
2009	The Crystal Caravan	The Crystal Caravan	Producer, backing vocals
2011	The Bloody Beetroots	"Church of Noise"	Guest vocals
2016	Sick of It All	When the Smoke Clears	Liner notes
2017	Demon System 13	Last Mosh For Charlie: Live In Umeå Hard Core	Guest artist on "(I'm Not Your) Steppin' Stone"
2017	The Moth Gatherer	The Comfortable Low	Guest artist on "This Providence of Bones"
2017	Ecca Vandal	Ecca Vandal	Guest vocals on "Price of Living", alongside Jason Aalon Butler
2018	Terror	Total Retaliation	Guest vocals on "One More Enemy"
2021	The Picturebooks & The Major Minor Collective	"Here's To Magic"	Guest artist
2021	Tom Morello	The Atlas Underground Fire	Guest artist on "Save Our Souls"

== See also ==
- Ny Våg
