= David Sandström =

Swedish drummer

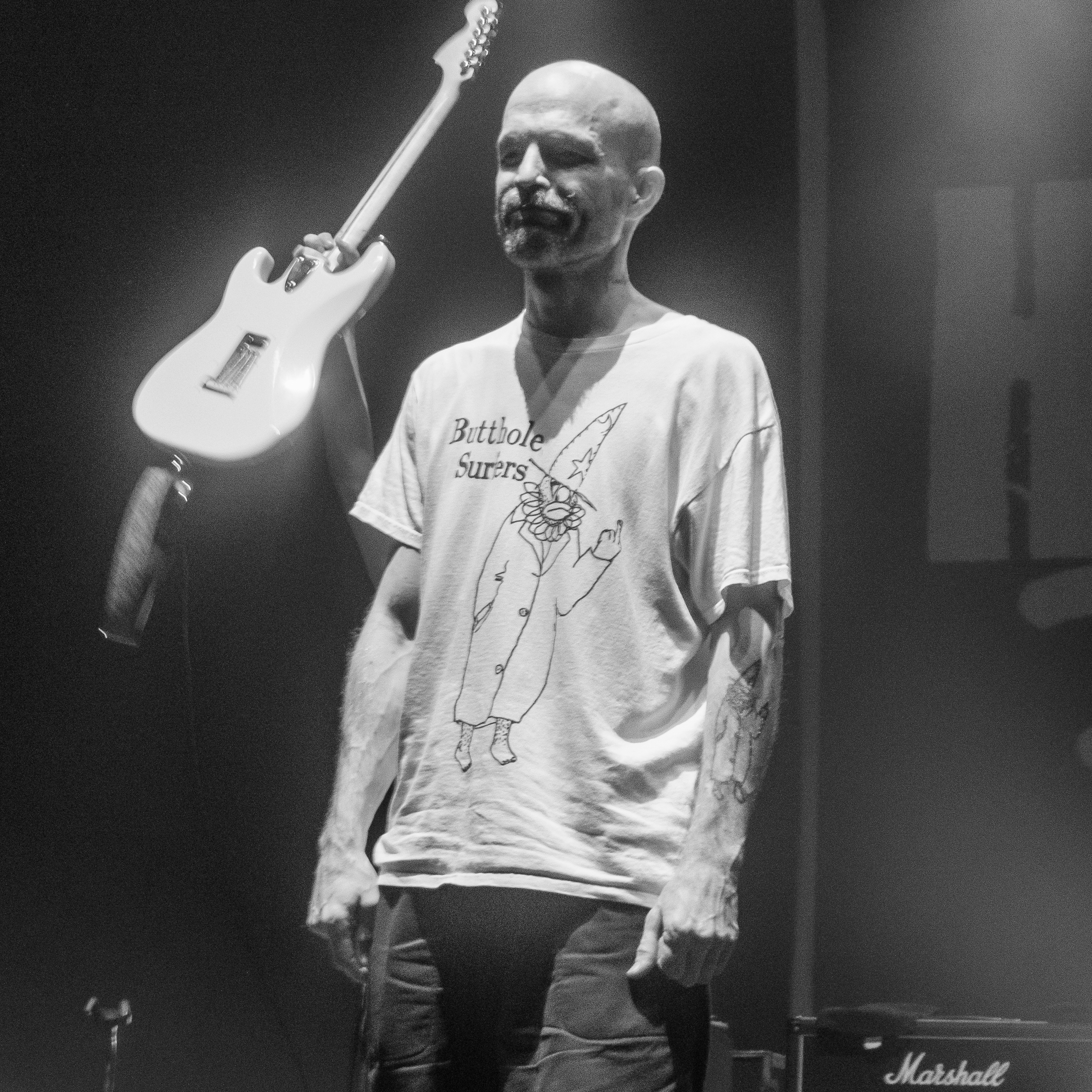
- Sandström at the Shrine Auditorium and Expo Hall in 2025

Background information
- Also known as: Dave Exit
- Born: 2 January 1975 (age 50); Umeå, Sweden
- Genres: Punk rock, indie rock, hardcore punk, post-hardcore
- Occupation: Musician
- Instrument(s): Drums, vocals, bass guitar
- Years active: 1991–present
- Member of: Refused, David Sandström Overdrive
- Formerly of: Final Exit, TEXT, AC4

David Sandström (born 2 January 1975) is a Swedish musician best known as the drummer for the hardcore punk group Refused. After Refused first broke up in 1998, he and the other members worked on a project entitled TEXT and released one album. Later, he went on to do solo work. In 2008, he formed the hardcore band AC4 with Refused frontman Dennis Lyxzén, playing bass guitar.

Sandström said that, before Refused formed, he was a "glue-sniffing death metal kid" but eventually a fan of Step Forward, the embryo of Refused. As Step Forward called it quits and the friendship between Sandström and Dennis Lyxzén grew stronger, Lyxzén took him home and made him listen to Youth of Today's We're Not in This Alone album over and over again in a room alone.

== David Sandström Overdrive ==
David Sandström Overdrive
- Origin: Sweden
- Genres: Indie
- Years active: 1998–present
- Labels: Mofab Teg Recordings, Razzia Records
- Members: David Sandström; Lars Eriksson; Frida Selander; Erik Nyhlin; Oskar Sandlund; Nippe Dahlskog

After Refused's demise, Sandström formed his own band, David Sandström Overdrive. His first release under his own name was called Om det inte händer nåt innan imorgon så kommer jag.. (If nothing happens before tomorrow, I am going to...). Om det is about David's grandfather, and was sung in Swedish. The second album, The Dominant Need of Needy Soul Is to Be Needed was released in 2004. His third album is Go Down! and was released in May 2005 under the name David Sandström Overdrive. In October 2008 the fourth album was released, titled Pigs Lose on Razzia Records.

=== Albums ===
==== The Faint Sounds of Shovelled Earth ====
Under the alias The Faint Sounds of Shovelled Earth
1998, Simba recordings

==== Text – ST ====
as Member
2000, Demon Box Recording
2000, Desperate Fight Records
2001, Buddyhead

==== Om det inte händer nåt innan imorgon så kommer jag ====
2000, Demonbox Recordings

==== The Dominant Need of the Needy Soul Is to Be Needed ====
2004, Mofab Teg Recordings

==== Go Down! ====
With David Sandström Overdrive. 2005, Mofab Teg Recordings

==== Pigs Lose ====
With David Sandström Overdrive. 2008, Razzia Records

==== You're The Lotion On Darkness Knuckles As It Punches Light in the Face ====
A Heavy Feather 2011, Razzia Records

=== Singles ===
- Here's For Summer (2:14), 2005 Mofab Teg Recordings
- Not a Good Boy (2:27), 2008 Mofab Teg Recordings
- Lisa, Lisa (4:04), 2008 Razzia Records
