= Randy the Band =

2005 album by Swedish punk rock band Randy

Studio album by Randy
- Released: October 10, 2005
- Recorded: May – June 2005
- Studio: Decibel Studios
- Genres: Punk rock; pop punk; new wave
- Length: 31:47
- Labels: Burning Heart Records; Epitaph Records; Ny Våg Records
- Producers: Pelle Gunnerfeldt; Randy

Randy chronology
Welfare Problems (2003)	Randy the Band (2005)

Randy the Band is an album by Swedish punk rock band Randy, released in October 2005 by Ny Våg Records and Epitaph Records/Burning Heart Records. As of July 2020, it is Randy's latest album.

The album produced one single, "Razorblade," for which the band recorded a music video.

== Background ==
In an interview in July 2006, the band's guitarist, Johan Brändström, stated that the band's sound at the time the album was recorded was influenced by several music styles: "everything from the hardest punk and metal to the softest country and other sweet-sounding stuff."

== Critical reception ==
Professional ratings
Review scores
Source	Rating
PunkNews	8/10 stars

In their review of the album, AllMusic called Randy "one of [Sweden]'s most highly touted punk bands" and positively likened the band to Green Day in saying that both groups are "ferociously energetic." The review also complimented Randy for "maintaining a knife-edge balance between youthful energy and tightly played rock & roll." While AllMusic did not give the album a formal rating or distinguish any tracks as highlights or standouts, the review itself individually praised the tracks "Punk Rock High," "Rich Boy," "Teenage Tiger," "I Raise My Fist," and "Losing My Mind."

PunkNews reviewer William David gave the album 8 out of 10 stars, remarking in his review, "Anyone who has followed the career of this band knows they have consistently delivered hit album after hit album, and [this album] is no exception." He complimented the band's style of "catchy-as-can-be rock n' roll" and noted that the band had "honed in on their melodic side this time around," differing from previous heavier and less melodic albums like Welfare Problems. David also compared the band's style in the album to The Clash, also complimenting the band for their guitar work, attention to melody, and socialist lyrical themes. David distinguished "Razorblade," "Evil," "The Pretender," and "Going Out With the Dead" as standout tracks.

Like AllMusic, Peter Gaston of Spin did not reward Randy the Band with a formal rating; however, in his review of the album, he praised the band's music for being "taut and loaded with punchy, fist-pumping choruses." He favorably compared the second track on the album, "Razorblade," to Social Distortion; he also favorably compared "Better than Art" to Andrew W.K. Lollipop Magazine reviewer Tim Den also gave the album a positive review with no formal rating, positively comparing the band's style to those of The Clash and New Bomb Turks. Den complimented the band's "return to the more bombastic/hooks-oriented nature of You Can't Keep a Good Band Down" while they maintained "ridiculous catchiness," remarking that "[e]very song is an anthem, every song is undeniable," and called Randy the Band "the band's best album in years," "the perfect punk rock album," and "the best of punk has to offer" [sic].

Like AllMusic and Spin, Sam Sutherland with Exclaim! did not award Randy the Band with a formal rating. However, he complimented the evolution in sound evident in the album, as well as the band's influence from predecessors in the punk rock and rock n' roll scenes: "While the band aren't the type to boldly explore any new sonic territory, they still manage to spice up such tracks as 'Going Out with the Dead' with the full-on cheese factor of dueling guitar solos. 'Teenage Tiger' pays homage to Little Richard with its nonsensical lyrical styling, and 'Losing My Mind' calls up the filthy guitar solos of Greg Ginn and Dez Cadena." Sutherland complimented lead vocalist Stefan Granberg's performance on the album in particular. He noted that the politics in Randy the Band were more subdued than those in previous albums but still called the album "a solid release from a generally consistent band."

In 2023, Ian Winwood from Louder called Randy the Band "damn-near-peerless" and "impossibly brilliant," stating that on the album, Randy "delivered as many apparently effortless back-to-back bangers as is possible to cram on two sides of black vinyl".

== Track listing ==
All music is composed by Randy (Johan Brändström, Fredrik Granberg, Stefan Granberg, Johan Gustafsson).

Track listing for Randy the Band
No.	Title	Length
1.	"Punk Rock High"	2:42
2.	"Razorblade"	2:19
3.	"Better than Art"	2:24
4.	"Evil"	2:03
5.	"Bahnhof Zoo"	3:15
6.	"Nothing on Me"	1:49
7.	"I Raise My Fist"	2:30
8.	"Red Banner Rockers"	2:30
9.	"The Pretender"	1:49
10.	"Going Out with the Dead"	2:51
11.	"Teenage Tiger"	2:04
12.	"Rich Boy"	2:20
13.	"Losing My Mind"	2:08
14.	"Promise"	3:12
15.	"The World Is Getting Bored"	2:53
Total length:		36:45

== Information ==
- Recorded at Decibel Studios
- Recorded by Estudiomac
- Mixed at Sjöbjörn Studio
- Mastered at Cutting Room Studios
- Mixed and engineered by Pelle Gunnerfeldt
- All tracks produced by Randy
- Artwork by Robert Pettersson
- Design (Cover/Laser/Back/Label), Layout by Hugo Sundkvist
- Published by Warner/Chappell and Picnic Music
- Released by Burning Heart on October 10, 2005
- Distributed by Epitaph Records/Epitaph Europe
- Performed by Randy

== Credits ==
- Fredrik Granberg - drums
- Johan Gustafsson - bass, background vocals
- Stefan Granberg - lead vocals, guitar
- Johan Brändström - guitar, background and lead vocals
- Randy - Primary Artist, Producer
