= Sleepyhead (disambiguation) =

"Sleepyhead" is a 2008 song by Passion Pit.

Sleepyhead or Sleepy Head may also refer to:

== Film and television ==
- "Sleepy Head" (Adventures of Pow Wow), an episode of Adventures of Pow Wow
- "Sleepyhead" (Thorne), a story arc in the TV series Thorne
- Sleepy Head, a 1920 film featuring Dagmar Dahlgren
- Sleepyhead, a kind of Munchkin in the film The Wizard of Oz

== Music ==
- Sleepyhead (band), a 1990s American rock band
- Sleepy-Head, a 1915 piano composition by Arnold Bax

=== Albums ===
- Sleepyhead (album), a 2013 album by Sibille Attar
- Sleepyheads, a 2003 album by Mr. Lif
- Sleepyhead, a 2002 album by The Brothers Creeggan
- Sleepyhead, a 2020 album by Cavetown
- Sleepyhead, a 2003 EP by Blueline Medic
- Sleepyhead, a 2016 EP by Galen Crew

=== Songs ===
- "Sleepyhead", a song by 78 Saab from The Bells Line
- "Sleepyhead", a song by Alkaline Trio from Maybe I'll Catch Fire
- "Sleepyhead", a song by As Tall as Lions from You Can't Take It with You
- "Sleepy Head", a song by Beat Happening from You Turn Me On
- "Sleepyheads", a song by the Black Crowes from Soul Singing
- "Sleepyhead", a song by Bomb the Bass from Clear
- "Sleepyhead", a song by Deconstruction from Deconstruction
- "Sleepy Head", a song by D:Ream from In Memory Of...
- "Sleepyhead", a song by Fun Lovin' Criminals, a B-side of the single "Korean Bodega"
- "Sleepyhead", a song by Gob from The World According to Gob
- "Sleepyhead", a song by Ed Harcourt from Elephant's Graveyard
- "Sleepy Head", a song by Ben E. King from I Have Songs in My Pocket
- "Sleepyhead", a song by Earl Klugh from The Spice of Life
- "Sleepy Head (Serene Machine)", a song by Ed Kuepper from Serene Machine
- "Sleepy Head", a song by the Pillows, music for the anime series FLCL
- "Sleepyhead", a song by the Reason from Things Couldn't Be Better
- "Sleepyheads", a song by XTC from Coat of Many Cupboards
- "Sleepy Head", a song composed by Billy Hill

== Other uses ==
- Sleepyhead, a 1953 Royal Doulton figurine
- Sleepyhead, a 2001 novel by Mark Billingham and basis for the Thorne episodes

== See also ==
- National Sleepy Head Day, an annual celebration in Finland
