= Your Choice Live Series 025 =

Live album by The (International) Noise Conspiracy
- Released: 2002
- Recorded: March 16, 2002
- Genre: Rock, Punk rock, Rock 'n Roll
- Label: Your Choice Records
- Producer: Tobby Holzinger

The (International) Noise Conspiracy chronology
A New Morning, Changing Weather (2001)	Your Choice Live Series 025 (2002)	Armed Love (2004)

Your Choice Live Series 025 is an album by The (International) Noise Conspiracy. It was recorded live at "Schlachthof" in Bremen the 16th of March 2002 and is the first full-length live album by The (International) Noise Conspiracy, produced by Tobby Holzinger. It has been released as a limited edition of 1000 LPs and 3000 CDs through Your Choice Records and was distributed through Cargo Records Germany.

== Track listing ==
All tracks are written by The (International) Noise Conspiracy.

No.	Title	Length
1.	"A Northwest Passage"	5:42
2.	"Bigger Cages, Longer Chains"	3:58
3.	"Up for Sale"	3:31
4.	"Smash It Up! / TV Eye"	6:30
5.	"Born into a Mess"	4:29
6.	"Capitalism Stole My Virginity"	5:39
7.	"Will It Ever Be Quiet?"	5:00
8.	"A New Morning Changing Weather"	7:00

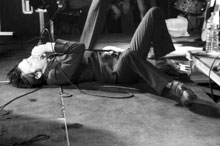

Dennis Lyxzén - The (International) Noise Conspiracy
