= I Know Your Name =

"I Know Your Name" may refer to:

- "I Know Your Name", demo instrumental from the 1980 Laughter (Ian Dury & The Blockheads album)
- "I Know Your Name", track from the 1998 album Live the Life by Michael W. Smith
- "I Know Your Name", song by the band Bee and Flower
- "I Know Your Name", track from the 2009 album This Is Gravity by the band The Strange Familiar
- "I Know Your Name", track from the 2012 album Breaking Away from The Sick-Leaves project of Eksteen Jacobsz
- "I Know Your Name", 2022 Mandarin Chinese song by Galen Crew
