= Haunting, Haunted, Haunts =

Single by Against Me!

from the album Shape Shift with Me
- Released: August 10, 2016
- Genre: Punk rock; Cowpunk
- Length: 2:25
- Label: Williams Street Records
- Songwriters: Laura Jane Grace, James Bowman, Atom Willard, Inge Johansson
- Producer: Against Me!

Against Me! singles chronology
"333" (2016)	"Haunting, Haunted, Haunts" (2016)	"Stabitha Christie / First High of the Morning" (2017)

"Haunting, Haunted, Haunts" is a song by the punk rock band Against Me!. It was the second single unveiled before the release of their seventh album Shape Shift With Me on August 10, 2016.

The song was released as part of the 2016 installment of the Adult Swim Singles Program.

== Personnel ==
- Laura Jane Grace – guitar, vocals
- James Bowman – guitar, backing vocals
- Inge Johansson – bass guitar, backing vocals
- Atom Willard – drums, percussion
