= The First Conspiracy =

Studio album by the (International) Noise Conspiracy
- Released: May 1, 1999
- Genre: Garage rock, punk
- Length: 27:19
- Label: G7 Welcoming Committee

The (International) Noise Conspiracy chronology
The First Conspiracy (1999)	Survival Sickness (2000)

Professional ratings
Review scores
Source	Rating
AllMusic	2.5/5 stars

The First Conspiracy is an album by the (International) Noise Conspiracy. It is a compilation of four 7" records that were released in Europe earlier that year. It was first released on International Workers' Day in 1999 on the record label G7 Welcoming Committee. In 2002, it was re-released with new cover art on Burning Heart Records. The record serves as a compilation of the first recordings by the band and acts as a framework for the ideas and musical themes that would become more fully formed on their debut album the following year, Survival Sickness.

== Track listing ==
All tracks are written by the (International) Noise Conspiracy.

No.	Title	Length
1.	"The First Conspiracy"	1:14
2.	"Abolish Work"	2:40
3.	"A New Language"	2:32
4.	"Do U Know My Name?"	2:11
5.	"T.I.M.E.B.O.M.B."	3:37
6.	"The Sin Crusade"	2:02
7.	"The Blast-Off"	1:40
8.	"Young Pretenders Army"	2:12
9.	"I Swear If U Do"	2:20
10.	"Airports"	1:57
11.	"Introduction To The..."	2:31
12.	"Black Mask"	2:24

Although it shares a title, "Black Mask" is not the same composition as what was featured on Armed Love
