= The Most (band) =

Swedish beat band

- Origin: Umeå, Sweden
- Genre: Beat music • mod • garage rock • psychedelic pop
- Years active: 2000–present
- Labels: The Most Recordings, CopaseDisques, Ny Våg Records
- Members: Frans Perris; Mats Westin; Martin Claesson
- Past members: Inge Johansson; Marcus Holmberg; Magnus Kollberg

The Most is a beat band from Umeå, Sweden. Original members are Frans Perris (guitars and vocals), Magnus Kollberg (guitars and vocals), Mats Westin (drums) and Marcus Holmberg (bass and organ). Vinyl EPs and albums being released on their own label TMR (The Most Recordings) and on the label Ny Våg and later on CopaseDisques. Drawing inspiration from old blues, jazz, bluegrass, 1950s-1960s soul, 1950s-1960s R&B but also from bands like The Zombies, The Kinks, and The Who, their music has been described as re-inventing 1960s music.

== History ==
The Most was formed by Frans Perris and Magnus Kollberg in early 2000 after different working projects, one being named Loving Nature featuring Michael Ludvigsson on drums. The Most first line up was established with the addition of bass player Marcus Holmberg from the band Komeda. In 2007, Marcus Holmberg was replaced by Inge Johansson (formerly with the band The (International) Noise Conspiracy). In 2013, Johansson was replaced by bass player Martin Claesson. The Most were spurred on to write Beat music by British Invasion creator Shel Talmy, who liked the song Bad Girl, and Chris Dreja from the Yardbirds.

The first EP Face the Future was released in 2008.

Andy Bell (Ride, Hurricane No. 1, Oasis, Beady Eye) has worked with The Most on various recordings and contributed guitars and vocals on the song Now I Feel from the second EP Moderation in Moderation (a title suggested by Andy Bell). A video for Now I Feel was made by Mattias Pettersson.

In 2009, The Most opened for The Sonics at the venue Debaser Medis in Stockholm, Sweden.

The band's third EP Resistance is Useless was released in 2010. Again Andy Bell contributed with guitar on one song, Easy When You're Down. In early 2011 a video for Little Girl was released.

Two new videos was released by The Most in early 2012. Firstly, The Action from the Face the Future EP. A few months later the band released Bad Girl from the Moderation in Moderation EP.

The Most first full-length album Auto-Destructive Art was released on May 17, 2013. A pre-release took place in Liverpool, UK with three live gigs at the famous Cavern Club for the International Pop Overthrow music festival. The first video from the album was for a song titled Spiderman. The second video from the album became the track So Wrong. It was released in August that same year.

The song She's Nuts was released in March 2014.

At Christmas 2014 the band released the Tages (band) song Fuzzy Patterns in a psychedelic video on YouTube.

The end of 2014 also saw the light of new single Picking Up Speed. Featuring two new original songs and cover art by Ian Barrett.

A video for the song I'm Not Your Man from the Auto-Destructive Art CD is released on YouTube in March 2015.

October 2015 saw the release of a second full-length album. This time on 12” black vinyl with an accompanying CD with the 15 album tracks. Recently back from an American tour the band used the tongue-in-check title Invasion Completed for the album. Liner notes were provided by John Twink Alder, formerly with The Pretty Things.

== Members ==
Current members

- Frans Perris – lead vocals, guitars, percussion (2000–present)
- Mats Westin – drums, percussion, organ, backing vocals (2000–present)
- Martin Claesson – bass, backing vocals (2013–present)

Touring and session members

- Rikard Form – keyboards, piano (2012–present)

Formed members

- Magnus Kollberg – guitars, backing vocals (2000–2023)
- Marcus Holmberg – bass, organ, percussion, backing vocals (2000–2007, 2013)
- Inge Johansson – bass, backing vocals (2007–2013)

== Discography ==
- Face the Future – 4 track 7" vinyl EP, Ny Våg 012, 2008
- Moderation in Moderation – 4 track 7" vinyl EP, Ny Våg 017/TMR 0002, 2008
- Resistance is Useless – 4 track 7" vinyl EP, TMR 0003, 2010
- Auto-Destructive Art – Full-length album CD, TMR 004, CopaseDisques Cat no CD013, 2013
- Picking Up Speed – 2 track 7" vinyl single, TMR 005, CopaseDisques Cat no SI-026, 2014
- Invasion Completed – Full-length album LP + free CD, TMR 006, CopaseDisques Cat no LP-015, 2015
- This Is My Town – 4 track 7" vinyl EP, TMR 007, CopaseDisques Cat no EP-035, 2017
- Beat Beat Boom!!! – Full-length album LP + free CD, TMR 008, CopaseDisques Cat no LP-020, 2018
- Howl / Pretty Baby - 2 track 7" vinyl single, TMR 009, CopaseDisques Cat no SI-039, 2020

Compilations

- Garageland Records 20th Anniversary CD – Back in the Garage (featuring the track Sweet Magic Monday) GRCD 030, 2004
- Ny Våg - Umeå Vråljazz Giganter (featuring the track Du är Punk) LP & CD, Ny Våg I20, 2009
- International Pop Overthrow - volume 18 (featuring the track Turn Away) CD, PGH-37, 2015
- Ghostroads – Music from the Soundtrack of the Motion Picture (featuring the track Gatecrashers) CD, Majestic Sound Records, 2017
- Out Of The Garage Volume Four (featuring the track Special Girl) CD, Bongo Boy Records, 2018
- Fuzzy Patterns - A Tribute To Tages (featuring the track Fuzzy Patterns) LP & CD, SEGAT Records, 2020
- Albert's Home For Discerning Modernists Vol 1 (featuring the track She's Nuts) CD, Detour Records, 2020
