= Penny Century =

Penny Century may refer to:

- Penny Century, a character in (and book title of) the comics Love and Rockets
- Penny Century, a 1988 EP by The Cassandra Complex
- Penny Century (The Clouds album), 1991
- Penny Century (The Bear Quartet album), 1992
