= Randy (band) =

Swedish punk rock band

- Origin: Hortlax, Sweden
- Genres: Punk rock; garage punk; ska punk; skate punk (early)
- Years active: 1992–present
- Labels: Fat Wreck Chords; Ny Våg; Burning Heart; Ampersand Records; Dolores Records
- Members: Stefan Granberg; Fredrik Granberg; Johan Brändström; Johan Gustafsson
- Past members: Patrik Trydvall
- Website: randytheband.com

Randy is a Swedish punk rock band from Hortlax, formed in 1992. While never achieving mainstream success, Randy have developed a cult following in the punk community over the years and were particularly successful in their homeland. They were particularly well-known for writing catchy songs with politically conscious messages, often broaching topics like income inequality, socialism, working-class revolutions throughout European history, and Karl Marx and Marxism.

Randy were signed by Burning Heart Records, a sub-label of Epitaph Records, in the early 2000s. They have released six studio albums. The latest album, Randy the Band, was released in 2005 on Burning Heart and Fat Wreck Chords.

== History ==
Randy began in 1992 in northern Sweden. Their guitarist, Johan Brändström, stated in an interview that he and the other band members were all close friends before forming Randy and that they formed the band out of their desire to "find a way to get away from dark winters and unemployment. Randy was our way out."

The band has been noted for shifting their style of punk rock several times throughout their career. Brändström stated that the band changed styles so frequently because "we have to explore new things; otherwise, we get bored. Probably a bad thing for business, but who cares." In their early years, including up to the release of The Rest Is Silence in 1996, they were inspired by skate punk bands like NOFX and Propagandhi. However, after the release of The Rest Is Silence and the departure of their original bass player, Patrik Trydvall, they radically changed their musical style and adopted a more classic punk rock sound reminiscent of older rock and punk bands like The Clash, Thin Lizzy, The Misfits, and Ramones. They also leaned heavily on a fusion of garage punk and pop to form their new sound, which they branded "[their] Randy sound." Their first album they released after their transition in style, You Can't Keep a Good Band Down, earned praise from MaximumRockNRoll, which called it "the best melodic punk CD since Bad Religion's No Control."

After his departure in 1997, Trydvall went on to contribute lead vocals in his now-disbanded punk rock group, Diefenbaker.

The albums The Human Atom Bombs and Welfare Problems, from 2001 and 2003 respectively, were also both released after the band's transition to garage-influenced punk; they are especially well regarded by punk rock fans and music critics. As their musical style evolved, Randy's lyrics gradually became less overtly political. Brändström stated, "The lyrics on the early records are pretty hard, radical political lyrics without knowing exactly what we were talking about," although he still thought fondly of "that naïve, angry style."

The band initially released their music on G7 Welcoming Committee Records due to their personal politics aligning with the label's left-wing political slant. They were also signed to Burning Heart Records to release their music in Europe, but after Burning Heart made a deal with Epitaph Records for the latter label to sell Burning Heart's catalog in the United States, and while citing negative experiences with Epitaph's executives, Randy decided to release their latest album, Randy the Band, in late 2005 through both Burning Heart and Fat Wreck Chords, citing their good experiences touring with other bands on Fat Wreck Chords and their positive interactions with Fat Wreck Chords' owners.

During their most active years, Randy rarely toured in North America, citing inhibitive costs; they had three tours in Canada and were scheduled to have two in the United States, although they ultimately only toured the U.S. once because their first tour was cancelled as a result of the September 11 attacks.

== Style ==
During the early to mid-2000s, music journalists often compared Randy to similar garage punk and garage rock bands, including fellow Swedish bands The Hives (which bassist Johan Gustafsson would join in 2013) and The (International) Noise Conspiracy.

== Recognition, accolades, and legacy ==
In a review of Randy's fifth album Welfare Problems, Chris O'Toole of the Bedlam Society identified Randy as "being the forefront of popularising the recent garage influenced Rock N' Roll revival." O'Toole also called Randy "one of the overshadowed acts" of that movement considering the relatively higher popularity of their peers. In his discussion of Randy's announcement of a comeback album in 2023, Louder's Ian Winwood called Randy "the greatest rock 'n' roll group you've never heard" and praised each of their then-latest three albums – The Human Atom Bombs, Welfare Problems, and Randy the Band – for their style and their political lyrics.

In 2002, Randy were invited to perform at Club Debaser in Stockholm to honor the memory of the recently deceased Joe Strummer from The Clash. Other noteworthy bands and artists that performed at the event included Infinite Mass, Weeping Willows, and Dregen and Nicke Borg from Backyard Babies.

In Sweden, Randy were nominated for the prestigious Golden Microphone award in 2004 for Best Live Act; they were nominated for the same by the independent Manifest Awards. They were also nominated for a Swedish Grammy for Best Rock Performance. In addition, their song "X-Ray Eyes," from Welfare Problems, received moderate airplay in Sweden.

In July 2020, the band's song "The Exorcist," featured on You Can't Keep a Good Band Down, was featured on the BBC's flagship film podcast, Kermode & Mayo's Film Review.

== Members ==
- Stefan Granberg – vocals, guitar (1992–present)
- Fredrik Granberg – drums (1992–present)
- Johan Brändström – guitar, background vocals (1992–present), some lead vocals (1997–present)
- Johan Gustafsson – bass, background vocals (1997–present)

=== Former members ===
- Patrik Trydvall – vocals, bass (1992–1997)

== Discography ==
=== Full-length albums ===
- There's No Way We're Gonna Fit In (Dolores Records 1994)
- The Rest Is Silence (Dolores Records 1996)
- You Can't Keep a Good Band Down (Ampersand Records 1998)
- The Human Atom Bombs (Burning Heart 2001)
- Welfare Problems (Burning Heart 2003)
- Randy the Band (Ny Våg/Burning Heart/Fat Wreck Chords 2005)

=== EPs, singles and compilations ===
- "En Riktig Man?" (1992)
- No Carrots for the Rehabilitated EP (1993 Dolores Records)
- Ska EP (1994 Dolores Records)
- "Education for unemployment" (1995 Dolores Records)
- Refused Loves Randy EP (1995 Startrec, with Refused)
- "At Any Cost" (1996 Dolores Records)
- Out of Nothing comes nothing 7" (1998 Ampersand Records)
- Return of the Read Menace (1999, G7 Welcoming Committee Records)
- "I Don't Need Love" (2001 Burning Heart)
- Cheater EP (2001 Busted Heads Records / G7 Welcoming Committee)
- "The Heebie Jeebies" (2001 Burning Heart)
- "Fat Club" (2001)
- Dropping Food on Their Heads Is Not Enough: Benefit for RAWA (2002 Geykido Comet Records)
- "X-Ray Eyes" (2003 Burning Heart)
- "Beware (If You Don't Want Your Babies To Grow Up To Be Punk Rockers)" (2004 Fat Wreck Chords, with Fat Mike)
- Chemical X DVD Music Video Compilation (2008 Geykido Comet Records)
