= Karl Backman =

Swedish artist and musician

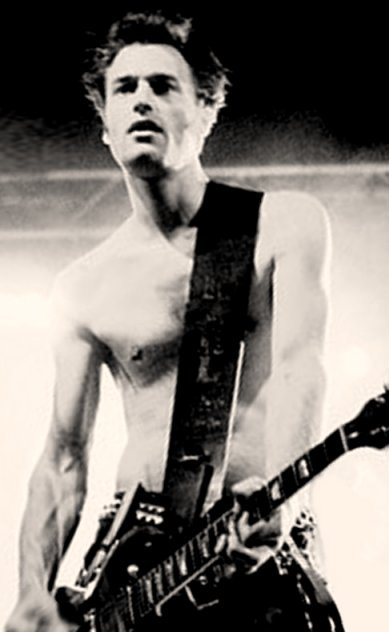
- Backman in 2009

Background information
- Born: 27 October 1970 (age 55); Umeå, Sweden
- Genres: Punk rock, hardcore punk
- Occupations: Artist, musician, songwriter, writer
- Instruments: Guitar, Vocals,
- Years active: 1982–present
- Labels: Deathwish Inc. Ny Våg; Busted Heads Records; Shock Entertainment
- Member of: Acid Blood
- Formerly of: AC4; The Vectors; The T-55's
- Website: http://karlbackman.com

Karl Backman (born 27 October 1970, Umeå) is a Swedish artist and musician.

== Music ==
Backman became involved in Punk rock in 1980 and started his first punk band the Boredom Brothers in 1982 when he was squatting in Umeå.

He formed the punk band The Vectors in 1990, with whom he was the lead guitarist and part vocalist throughout their career. The Vectors split up in 2008.

Backman was also the lead guitarist and the main songwriter in AC4, a hardcore punk band he started in 2008 with ex-Refused members Dennis Lyxzén and David Sandström.

Sometime in the late summer of 2013 Backman formed a band called The T-55's, as AC4 was on a break, and in late 2016 he started his current band Acid Blood.

He is interviewed about his views on artistic expression in the Australian documentary film A few minutes with AC4.

== Art ==
Backman's paintings are often colourful and large in scale, covering political, religious and sexual themes and is inspired by the Punk aesthetic. He has designed covers for many records and is also a prolific member of the international art project Artmoney.

Backman has worked internationally with many pornographic actresses including Satine Phoenix, Ashley Blue, Layla Rivera, Summer Luv, Drew Allen, Barbii Bucxxx and May Ling Su for noted exhibitions at The Museum of Porn in Art in Zurich, 2011 and 2012.

Backman and his girlfriend visited the Chernobyl nuclear disaster site in 2010 with a documentary news team from AFP. As of 2013, he was working on an exhibition of paintings based on the photographs he took there.

== Discography ==
Acid Blood

- 2017: Dagger Eyes (JanML Records, Germany)
- 2019: Acid Blood (JanML Records, Germany)

The T-55's

- 2014: Power Up (JanML Records, Germany)
- 2014: Split with Mary's Kids (Strange Magic Records/AM Records, USA)

AC4

- 2009: AC4 (Ny Våg, Scandinavia / Deranged, USA 2010 / Shock Entertainment, Australia 2011)
- 2010: AC4 / SSA (Aniseed, Australia)
- 2010: Umeå Hardcore (P.Trash)
- 2013: Burn The World (Ny Våg, Scandinavia / Deathwish Inc., USA)

The Vectors

- 1996: Fuck MTV (New Lifeshark)
- 1998: The Vectors (New Lifeshark)
- 2000: Rape the Pope (Rabid Alligator)
- 2003: Still Ill (Busted Heads Records)
- 2011: Pigs and Parasites (SIK Records)
