= What Are You Waiting For? =

What Are You Waiting For? may refer to:

== Albums ==
- What Are You Waiting For? (FM Static album), 2003
- What Are You Waiting For? (Krezip album), 2005
- What Are You Waiting For, a 2012 album by Jiro Wang

== Songs ==
- "What Are You Waiting For" (Linsday Lohan song), 2004
- "What Are You Waiting For?" (The Saturdays song), 2014
- "What Are You Waiting For?" (Nickelback song), 2014
- "What Are You Waiting For?" (D4vd song), 2025
- "What Are You Waiting For?", a single by Dane Rumble from the 2010 album The Experiment
- "What Are You Waiting For", a song written by Gary Lightbody
- "What Are You Waiting For", a 1997 single by Phajja
- "What Are You Waiting For?", a single by The Tides from the 2007 album One for the Man Over There
- "What Are You Waitin' For", song by Montrose (written by Dan Hartman) from Jump on It
- "What Are You Waiting For?", a single by Lauri Ylönen from New World
- "What Are You Waiting For", a song by Tantric from Mind Control
- "What Are You Waiting For", a single by Nailpin
- "What Are You Waiting For?", a song by Hunters & Collectors from album What's a Few Men?
- "What Are You Waiting For?", a song by Karine Polwart from Faultlines
- "What Are You Waiting For?", a song by The Sick-Leaves
- "What Are You Waiting For?", a song by Brigade from Come Morning We Fight
- "What Are You Waiting For?", a song by Kathleen Edwards from Back to Me
- "What Are You Waiting For?", a song by Miranda Cosgrove from Sparks Fly
- "What Are You Waiting For", a song by The Saints from Everybody Knows the Monkey
- "What Are You Waiting For", a song by Emmelie from Only Teardrops
- "What Are You Waiting For", a song by Mai Kuraki from Perfect Crime
- "What Are You Waiting For?", a song by Sherwood from QU
- "What Are You Waiting For", a song by ATB from Contact
- "What Are You Waiting For", a song by Evelyn King from I'm in Love
- "What Are You Waiting For", a song by Phantom Planet from Raise the Dead
- "What Are You Waiting For?", a song by No Secrets from No Secrets
- "What Are You Waiting For?", a song by Fair Ground
- "What Are You Waiting For?", a song by Tupelo Honey
- "Ti perimenis?" ("What Are You Waiting For"), a Greek song by Antonis Remos from the 2005 album San Anemos
- "What Are You Waiting For?", a song by Disturbed from the 2015 album Immortalized

== See also ==
- "Mistanie Eiy" (song) ("What Are You Waiting For"), an Arabic song by Amal Hijazi
- What You Waiting For? (disambiguation)
