= Stabitha Christie / First High of the Morning =

"Stabitha Christie" / "First High of the Morning"

Single by Against Me!
- Released: April 22, 2017 (physical); May 26, 2017 (digital)
- Recorded: 2016
- Studio: Rancho Recordo
- Genre: Punk rock
- Length: 5:23
- Label: Total Treble Music
- Composer: Against Me!
- Lyricist: Laura Jane Grace
- Producer: Against Me!

Against Me! singles chronology
| "Haunting, Haunted, Haunts" (2016) | "Stabitha Christie" / "First High of the Morning" (2017) |

Alternate cover
- Physical version

"Stabitha Christie" / "First High of the Morning" is a single from Against Me!, released on 7" vinyl on April 22, 2017, on Total Treble Music, as a limited edition for Record Store Day 2017. Unlike previous Record Store Day releases by Against Me!, the single was released digitally on May 26, 2017.

The songs are both b-sides from the Shape Shift with Me recording sessions.

== Track listing ==
All tracks are written by Laura Jane Grace.

| No. | Title | Length |
|---|---|---|
| 1. | "Stabitha Christie" | 2:31 |
| 2. | "First High of the Morning" | 2:52 |
| Total length: | | 5:23 |

== Personnel ==
- Laura Jane Grace – lead vocals, guitar
- James Bowman – guitar, backing vocals
- Inge Johansson – bass, backing vocals
- Atom Willard – drums, percussion
- TBC – violin (2)
- Steak Mtn. – design, typography, and illustration
