= Ruff Stuff =

Ruff Stuff may refer to:

- "RuffStuff Specialties", a 4x4 and metal fabrication company based in Loomis, CA.
- "Ruff Stuff", a song by AC/DC from their 1988 album Blow Up Your Video
- "Ruff Stuff", a song by Gomez from their 2002 album In Our Gun
- "Ruff Stuff", a song by Randy from their 2003 album Welfare Problems
