= The Bear Quartet =

Swedish indie rock band

- Pictured from left to right: Jejo Perkovic, Mattias Alkberg, Jari Haapalainen, Peter Nuottaniemi, Calle Olsson

Background information
- Origin: Luleå, Sweden
- Genres: Alternative rock; indie rock; prog rock; post-punk
- Years active: 1989–2010
- Labels: A West Side Fabrication; Adrian Recordings; Sticky Records
- Past members: Mattias Alkberg; Jari Haapalainen; Peter Nuottaniemi; Jejo Perkovic; Calle Olsson; See band members section for others
- Website: thebearquartet.com

The Bear Quartet was a cult indie rock band from Luleå in northern Sweden. They were formed in the summer of 1989 with the original roster of Mattias Alkberg on guitar and vocals, Jari Haapalainen and Johan Forsling on guitar, Peter Nuottaniemi on bass, and Magnus Olsson on drums. However, the band's lineup changed significantly before eventually settling on Mattias Alkberg on vocals and guitar, Jari Haapalainen on guitar, Peter Nuottaniemi on bass, Jejo Perkovic on drums, and Calle Olsson on keyboards. Their name is a reference to the novel Gentlemen by Klas Östergren. Although they were formed in 1989, they didn't garner the attention of a record label until 1992. They made records at a steady rate from 1992, with their debut album, Penny Century, to 2010 with their final album Monty Python. Their albums were often received favorably, but they never resulted in large sales, usually only selling between 1,000 and 10,000 units per disc. The band is very obscure across the world, although they are much better known in Sweden.

== Music ==
The lyrics of their music were written by Alkberg and Nuottaniemi, and the music was written by Alkberg, Haapalainen, and Calle Olsson. The band was very unusual compared to other bands in a variety of ways, such as their unwillingness to play old songs at live performances. They have also had several guests on their music such as Sibille Attar on Monty Python, Karin Dreijer on Personality Crisis, Alexandra Dahlström on Ny Våg, and Mats Levén on Eternity Now. At the beginning of their career, The Bear Quartet made much louder, fast-paced rock music which would often be very reliant on electric guitars, although later songs by the band would have a slower tempo and be more reliant on acoustic guitars, and others would have a much more varied instrumentation. They would later attempt many other different styles, such as the much more experimental style of Ny våg, Saturday Night, and Eternity Now. After Eternity Now came 89 in 2009. 89 was a completely new kind of album for the band, although this style would be retired shortly after it was introduced, as their final album, Monty Python, had a much different sound than 89, and the band had stopped releasing music after two albums under Adrian.

All albums by The Bear Quartet (with the exception of their two final albums, 89 and Monty Python, which were released under Adrian Recordings) were released on Skellefteå-based independent record label A West Side Fabrication, although they also released "Blizzard" as a single under Sticky Records, with "Headacher" as the B-side.

The band's albums follow a very unusual naming scheme. Every title consists of two words, with the first always ending in a "y", although it is unknown why they chose this naming scheme. However, singles and EPs by the band do not follow this naming scheme. The only full-length album they've released that doesn't follow this naming scheme is their penultimate album, 89. Although, the word "eighty-nine" consists of two words (eighty and nine), and eighty ends in a "y".

== Career ==
=== A West Side Fabrication era ===
The Bear Quartet was formed in 1989 and they were signed to A West Side Fabrication in the spring of 1992. After they were signed to A West Side Fabrication, they released their debut album, Penny Century, on 20 October 1992. Following the release of Penny Century, drummer Magnus Olsson left the band and was replaced by Urban Nordh. The band released Cosy Den, Family Affair, and "Blizzard/Headacher" in 1993 followed by Revisited in 1994.

Following the release of Cosy Den on 5 June 1993, The Bear Quartet recorded a session for John Peel, a British disc jockey, radio presenter, and record producer. In 1993, when the session was recorded, the band did not have a permit to work in England, so the session was recorded in Studio KN in Skellefteå. Peel also conducted a phone interview with Haapalainen. This session was collected on the band's compilation album, Early Years. The songs recorded for this session include "Spoon", "High Noon", "Hrrn Hrrn", "Gone Gone", and "Sandi Morning and Lude".

In the spring of 1995, Haapalainen and Nordh moved to Stockholm and Forsling left the band. This forced the band to stop releasing music temporarily. However, they were able to continue making music afterward, and they released It Only Takes a Flashlight to Create a Monster, Everybody Else, Flux Detail, Holy Holy, and Tibet later that year. Following their most prolific year in 1995, 1996 was the first year of their career in which The Bear Quartet did not release any music due to Nordh's departure from the band in the summer of that year. However, eventually he was succeeded by Perkovic.

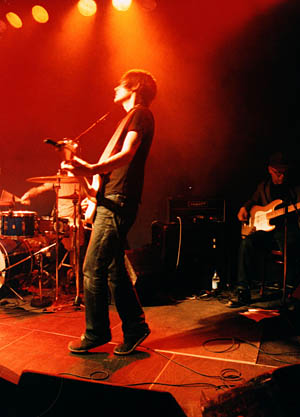
Haapalainen performing with the Bear Quartet at the Accelerator festival in 2003

After It Only Takes a Flashlight to Create a Monster, Everybody Else, Flux Detail, Holy Holy, and Tibet came Moby Dick in 1997, which featured many guest musicians, and which released to critical acclaim. It released alongside the EPs Before the Trenches and His Spine. During the spring of 1998, the Bear Quartet recorded Personality Crisis, their seventh album, which released in August of that year. The band collaborated with Calle and Björn Olsson on the album, the former of whom would later become a regular member of the band. By the end of 1998, the band had released Human Enough, Personality Crisis, and Mom and Dad. The band did not release any music in 1999. Instead, they spent the year working on their next two albums (My War and Gay Icon) and touring in Germany. In 2000, the band released My War, alongside the EPs I Don't Wanna and Old Friends. After My War came Gay Icon, Load It, and Fuck Your Slow Songs in 2001. Gay Icon was much more experimental than The Bear Quartet's previous albums, especially the much more minimalistic My War, which had come before it. In 2002, The Bear Quartet released Ny våg, in collaboration with Alexandra Dahlström. It took on an even more experimental style than its predecessor, Gay Icon, oscillating between punk rock and avant garde. The album released alongside the EP Number. In 2003 came All Your Life, followed by Angry Brigade, which was influenced by the far-left militant group of the same name. Ask Me Don't Axe Me followed the release of Angry Brigade followed by Saturday Night and I Have an Itch in 2005. Nuottaniemi left the band in 2006, but the Bear Quartet still released Eternity Now in that same year, alongside the promotional single "Repairing of the Red Sea", would later rejoin the band.

=== Adrian Recordings era ===
Following the release of Eternity Now, the band stopped releasing music to consider what their next album should be like. However, in 2009 they were approached by Adrian Recordings to release a new album, to which they agreed. The resulting album was 89, the first of two albums to be released by the Bear Quartet under Adrian Recordings. It was released alongside the singles "Millions" and "Carry Your Weight". Following the release of 89, the Bear Quartet were nominated for a Grammis award, which they declined, saying they wanted nothing to do with it. Alkberg had previously rejected a nomination for a Grammis, saying, "Vi avböjer den här nomineringen. Ni kan behålla er skit för er själva." which translates to, "We reject this nomination. You can keep your shit to yourself." Alkberg said in a letter on the behalf of the Bear Quartet, "Tack men nej tack. Vi avsäger oss nomineringen, vi vill inte ha med Er att göra. Hoppas Ni respekterar detta. Vi tycker att en ursäkt vore på sin plats. Säg förlåt. Vänligen, the Bear Quartet," which translates to, "Thanks but no thanks. We renounce the nomination, we do not want to have anything to do with you. Hope you respect this. We think an apology would be in order. Say sorry. Regards, the Bear Quartet.”

Alkberg later elaborated in an interview that, "Jag visste inget om att Adrian hade anmält oss till Grammisskiten förrän vi hade bestämt oss för att vi inte ville vara med....jag VILL sälja skivor. Jag VILL INTE ha med Grammisgalan att göra. Man behöver INTE ta det onda med det goda," which translates to:

"I did not know that Adrian had signed up for the Grammis shit until we had decided that we did not want to join....I WANT to sell records. I do NOT WANT to deal with the Grammis Awards. You do NOT have to take the bad with the good." When asked in a separate interview why he did not want the Bear Quartet to be associated with the Grammis Awards, Alkberg replied, "I do not like to compete in music in general, and the Grammis Gala in particular. I do not want the Bear Quartet to be associated with the music industry in that way. To pat each other on the back and give praise for being so good has so little to do with us and it just feels wrong. If others want to do it, they are welcome to do so, but we do not want to join."

Following the release of 89 in 2009, the Bear Quartet released Monty Python in the autumn of 2010, in collaboration with Sibille Attar. Alkberg stated in an interview that it was one of their most difficult albums to make. It was released alongside the single "Fist or Hand".

Most of The Bear Quartet's albums received acclaim from Swedish music critics.

== Side projects ==
The Bear Quartet has spawned several side-projects. Alkberg used to be in the pop group Mattias Alkberg BD. Haapalainen used to be in the Jari Haapalainen Trio (also known as JH3), as well as the pop duo Heikki with Maria Eriksson. He has also worked as a producer for several artists such as the Concretes, Nicolai Dunger, Camera Obscura, and Laakso. Olsson used to be in Paddington Distortion Combo, (otherwise known as Paddington D.C.), Perkovic worked with hip-hop group Infinite Mass and noise rock band Brick, and Nuottaniemi worked with the band Container of Love.

== Disbanding ==
On 30 July 2010 the band played their final live performance at the Storsjöyran music festival in Östersund, and on 12 September 2010 the Bear Quartet released their final album, Monty Python. In an interview, when asked what he would like to do after Monty Python, Alkberg said, "I don’t know if we’ll ever come back to anything....I don’t want to think about it anymore than I have to. This record has really, really taken its toll on us." In another interview, when asked about the break-up of the Bear Quartet, Alkberg elaborated on their disbanding: "Some of us could not stand some others....It had been dysfunctional since day one. Several had children, some had a hard time combining it with BQ. Some had trouble keeping others from having children. And then we drank a little too hard. It was such a misery with BQ."

== Band members ==
=== Final line-up ===
- Mattias Alkberg – lead vocals, rhythm guitar (1989-2010)
- Jari Haapalainen – lead guitar (1989-2010
- Peter Nuottaniemi – bass (1989-2006, 2009-2010)
- Jejo Perkovic – drums, backing vocals (1997-2010)
- Calle Olsson – keyboards (1998-2010)

=== Former members ===
- Magnus Olsson – drums (1989-1992)
- Urban Nordh – drums (1992-1996)
- Johan Forsling – lead guitar (1989-1995)

== Discography ==
=== Studio albums ===
- 1992 Penny Century
- 1993 Cosy Den
- 1993 Family Affair
- 1995 Everybody Else
- 1995 Holy Holy
- 1997 Moby Dick
- 1998 Personality Crisis
- 2000 My War
- 2001 Gay Icon
- 2002 Ny våg (Swedish for "New Wave")
- 2003 Angry Brigade
- 2005 Saturday Night
- 2006 Eternity Now
- 2009 89
- 2010 Monty Python

=== Compilation albums ===
- 2003 Early Years (2 CD compilation of EP tracks, demos and radio sessions)

=== EPs ===
- 1994 Revisited
- 1995 It Only Takes a Flashlight to Create a Monster
- 1995 Flux Detail
- 1995 Tibet
- 1997 Before the Trenches
- 1997 His Spine
- 1998 Human Enough
- 1998 Mom and Dad
- 2000 Old Friends
- 2000 I Don't Wanna
- 2001 Load It
- 2001 Fuck Your Slow Songs
- 2002 Number
- 2003 All Your Life
- 2003 Ask Me Don't Axe Me
- 2005 I Have an Itch

=== Singles ===
- 1993 "Blizzard/Headacher"
- 2006 "Repairing of the Red Sea" (Promotional disc)
- 2009 "Carry Your Weight"
- 2009 "Millions"
- 2010 "Fist or Hand"
