= The Human Atom Bombs =

2001 album by Swedish punk rock band Randy

Studio album by Randy
- Released: August 7, 2001
- Studio: Pelle Gunnerfeldt Studios
- Genre: Punk rock
- Length: 40:28
- Label: Burning Heart
- Producer: Pelle Gunnerfeldt

Randy chronology
You Can't Keep a Good Band Down (1998)	The Human Atom Bombs (2001)	Welfare Problems (2003)

Professional ratings
Review scores
Source	Rating
Allmusic	4.5/5 stars
PunkNews	4/5 stars

The Human Atom Bombs is the fourth album by the punk rock band, Randy, released in August 2001 by Epitaph Records/Burning Heart Records. It is the band's first release on Epitaph Records.

== Critical reception ==
The Human Atom Bombs received critical acclaim. Most reviews praised the band for crafting their own original sound that borrowed from the founders of rock n' roll and punk rock, while also praising the band for shifting and maturing their sound from previous albums that were more in line with melodic hardcore and skate punk.

In her review of the album, AllMusic's Jo-Ann Greene awarded the album a score of 4.5 out of 5 stars, praising the band's ability to be "smart and witty, well-read but not pretentious, equally adroit at addressing everyday concerns and larger societal issues," while still "[boasting] strong melodies and storming performances. Plus, their music is anthemic but still kicks butt." Greene favorably compared the band's efforts in their previous 1998 album, You Can't Keep a Good Band Down, with their efforts in The Human Atom Bombs, complimenting the band's maturity into "a more diverse and evolved sound to support their militant message." Greene also pointed out the band's homage to previous bands in their style, including The Stooges, The Clash, and several founders of rock n' roll like Little Richard and Eddie Cochran. In concluding the review, Greene called the album "a wild ride across past and present."

In his review of the album for PunkNews, Chris Moran, who awarded the album 4 out of 5 stars, pointed out that the track "Addicts of Communication" gave him "a Clash flashback" and compliments the album for offering "not your normal Swede-Pop-Punk" in the midst of other Swedish punk rock bands like No Fun at All, Millencolin, and Bombshell Rocks. Moran praised the band for their "powerful politically charged lyrics" and for "[delivering] their feelings of anarchy in a swagger that has not been heard for some time." Moran cited "Karl Marx and History," "Proletarian Hop," "Freedom Song," "Summer of Bros," "Shape Up," and "Rockin' Pneumonia and the Punk Rock Flu" as stand-out tracks.

While not awarding the album with a star rating, Exclaim! reviewer Rob Ferraz called the album "an excellent collection of catchy anthems with a message worth hearing" and complimented the band for "[branching] out compared to their G7 release in 1999." He continued in the review to say, "One of the coolest things about this is the '50s rock n' roll influence," pointing out the evident influences from Little Richard, Eddie Cochran, and Amos Milburn throughout the album: "instead of a bunch of former straightedge 20-somethings who slick their hair back in pompadours and sport Buddy Holly glasses, these guys actually know their music history." He concluded the review by saying, "If Randy were the Clash, this would be their London Calling."

In their review of the album, Ox Fanzine (a subsidiary of Germany's music-focused Fuze Magazine) praised the album, calling The Human Atom Bombs "incredible" and positively juxtaposing the record with Randy's previous "not bad, but also rather unoriginal" output. They praised the album for its musical diversity and said that while Randy reminded them of The Clash, the comparison was "unfair" because the band had crafted a unique and original style blending "garage, pop, rock n' roll, and hardcore." The review does not name any standout tracks or award the album with a formal rating.

== Influence and legacy ==
In December 2023, Fat Mike of NOFX cited The Human Atom Bombs as a personal songwriting influence in a list of his personal favorites compiled for Spin, commending the album for "[its] production, [its] lyrics, [its] harmonies, and the total lack of professionalism."

== Track listing ==
All music is composed by Randy (Johan Brändström, Fredrik Granberg, Stefan Granberg, Johan Gustafsson).

Track listing for The Human Atom Bombs
No.	Title	Length
1.	"Chicken Shack"	1:39
2.	"Addicts of Communication"	2:03
3.	"Punk Rock City"	2:34
4.	"Keeping Us Out of Money"	1:22
5.	"Karl Marx and History"	2:56
6.	"Summer of Bros"	3:23
7.	"I Don't Need Love"	2:47
8.	"If We Unite"	2:26
9.	"Proletarian Hop"	3:02
10.	"Shape Up"	1:36
11.	"Rockin' Pneumonia and the Punk Rock Flu"	1:36
12.	"Freedom Song"	3:26
13.	"Whose Side Are You On?"	0:44
14.	"Win or Lose"	1:58
15.	"The Human Atom Bomb"	2:40
16.	"I Believe in the Company"	1:50
17.	"The Heebie Jeebies (Dial 9-1-1)"	2:11
Total length:		40:28

== Information ==
- Recorded and mixed at Pelle Gunnerfeldt Studio (Pelle's Place)
- Produced by Pelle Gunnerfeldt
- Mastered at Polar Studios by Henrik Jonsson
- Artwork by Henrik Walse and Torbjörn Persson

== Credits ==
- Fredrik Granberg - drums
- Johan Gustafsson - bass, background vocals
- Stefan Granberg - lead vocals, guitar
- Johan Brändström - guitar, background and lead vocals
- Randy - primary artist, producer
