= My War (The Bear Quartet album) =

Studio album by the Bear Quartet
- Released: 2000
- Genre: Indie
- Label: A West Side Fabrication

The Bear Quartet chronology
Personality Crisis (1998)	My War (2000)	Gay Icon (2001)

Professional ratings
Review scores
Source	Rating
AllMusic	4/5 stars

My War is a record album by the Bear Quartet released in 2000 on the record label A West Side Fabrication. At the time of the release it received generally good reviews. The album has more acoustic guitars than its predecessors, accompanied by electronic sounds.

== Track listing ==
1. "What I Hate"
2. "Old Friends"
3. "Helpless"
4. "Everybody Gets to Play"
5. "Needs Vs. Facts"
6. "Walking Out"
7. "Eastbound"
8. "I Had a Job"
9. "I Don't Wanna"
10. "I Can Wait"
