= Bigger Cages, Longer Chains =

EP by The (International) Noise Conspiracy
- Released: November 25, 2002
- Recorded: May 2001 and September 2002
- Genre: Garage punk
- Labels: Burning Heart (Europe/USA); Epitaph (USA); Shock (Australia); Cargo (Germany)
- Producers: Jari Haapalainen, Don Alstherberg

The (International) Noise Conspiracy chronology
| Up For Sale EP (2002) | Bigger Cages, Longer Chains (2002) | Black Mask EP (2004) |

Professional ratings
Review scores
| Source | Rating |
|---|---|
| AllMusic | 4/5 stars |

Bigger Cages, Longer Chains is an EP by The (International) Noise Conspiracy.

== Track listing ==
1. "Bigger Cages, Longer Chains"
2. "Beautiful So Alone"
3. "Baby Doll" (N.E.R.D cover)
4. "Waiting For Salvation"
5. "A Textbook Example"
6. "When Words Are Not Working"

== Personnel ==
Band

- Sara Almgren – guitars, organ
- Ludwig Dahlberg – drums, percussion
- Inge Johansson – bass
- Dennis Lyxzén – lead vocals
- Lars Strömberg – guitars

Production and additional musicians

- Jari Haapalainen – percussion, production, mixing, mastering
- Don Alstherberg – production, engineering, mixing
- Henrik Jonsson – mastering
- Hugo Sundkvist – layout, artwork
- Pelle Gunnerfeld – sound engineer, mixing
- Johan Gustafsson – sound engineering, mixing
- Björn Yttling – horn arrangements
- Jonas Kullhammar – saxophone
- Markus Olsson – saxophone
- Sven-Eric Dahlberg – rhodes piano
- Bittersweet – backing vocals
