= Shape Shift with Me =

Studio album by Against Me!
- Released: September 16, 2016
- Recorded: October 2015 to April 2016
- Studio: Rancho Recordo
- Genres: Punk rock; new wave; post-punk; alt-punk
- Length: 38:26
- Labels: Total Treble (international); Xtra Mile (Europe)
- Producers: Laura Jane Grace; Marc Hudson

Against Me! chronology
| 23 Live Sex Acts (2015) | Shape Shift with Me (2016) |

Professional ratings
Aggregate scores
| Source | Rating |
|---|---|
| Metacritic | 79/100 |
Review scores
| Source | Rating |
| Pitchfork | 7.4/10 |
| AllMusic | 4/5 stars |

Shape Shift with Me is the seventh and currently final studio album by American punk rock band Against Me! before entering an indefinite hiatus. It was released on September 16, 2016 on Total Treble Music and Xtra Mile. The title is a lyric from the song "Norse Truth", which appears as track 10. Shape Shift with Me features a shift in vocal style on many of its songs, with Grace hailed for a more spoken word-like structure in her singing on songs such as "12:03", "333" and "Norse Truth".

No non-promotional singles were released from the album. However, both of the B-sides recorded for the album, as identified from the band's publishing catalogue, "Stabitha Christie" and "First High of the Morning", were released on a 7" single to mark Record Store Day 2017. It is the group's only studio album recorded with bass player Inge Johansson.

== Accolades ==
| Publication | Accolade | Year | Rank | Ref. |
|---|---|---|---|---|
| American Songwriter | Top 50 Albums of 2016 | 2016 | 30 | |

== Track listing ==
All lyrics are written by Laura Jane Grace; all music is composed by Grace, James Bowman, Inge Johansson, and Atom Willard, except tracks 1 and 4 (Grace), 3 (Grace, Cody Votolato, Marc Hudson), 10 (Grace, Votolato), and 11 (Grace, Willard).

| No. | Title | Length |
|---|---|---|
| 1. | "ProVision L-3" | 1:55 |
| 2. | "12:03" | 2:56 |
| 3. | "Boyfriend" | 3:55 |
| 4. | "Crash" | 2:35 |
| 5. | "Delicate, Petite & Other Things I'll Never Be" | 4:17 |
| 6. | "333" | 3:17 |
| 7. | "Haunting, Haunted, Haunts" | 2:25 |
| 8. | "Dead Rats" | 4:08 |
| 9. | "Rebecca" | 2:38 |
| 10. | "Norse Truth" | 3:07 |
| 11. | "Suicide Bomber" | 3:37 |
| 12. | "All This (And More)" | 3:36 |
| Total length: | | 38:26 |

== Personnel ==
Credits are adapted from the album's liner notes.

Against Me!

- Laura Jane Grace – lead vocals, guitar, art direction
- James Bowman – guitar, backing vocals
- Inge Johansson – bass on all tracks except "Boyfriend" and "Suicide Bomber"
- Atom Willard – drums

Additional musicians

- Marc Hudson – bass on "Boyfriend" and "Suicide Bomber"
- Masukaitenero – Japanese backing vocals on "ProVision-L3"
- Béatrice Martin – backing vocals (uncredited) on "Suicide Bomber" and "All This (And More)"

Production

- Marc Hudson – producer, mix engineer, recording engineer
- Stephen Marcussen – mastering
- Stewart Whitmore – mastering

Design

- Christopher Norris – art direction
- Steak Mtn – design, typography, and illustration

== Charts ==
| Chart (2016) | Peak position |
|---|---|
| Australian Albums (ARIA) | 61 |
| Canadian Albums (Billboard) | 72 |
| Scottish Albums (Official Charts) | 74 |
| US Billboard 200 | 80 |
| US Independent Albums (Billboard) | 5 |

== See also ==
- Against Me! discography
