= Existensminimum =

Board game

Existensminimum is a Swedish board game produced in 2003 that simulates how to survive living at or below the poverty line.

== Description ==
Existensminimum (Swedish for "Minimum Subsistence", the minimum income considered necessary for a reasonable standard of living) is a game where players take on the role of economically disadvantaged people trying to survive.

The game was designed by Ann-Sofie Persson, a single mother of five, and two friends, Anna and David Lindmark. Persson found that many board games where players accumulate wealth were unrealistic, saying "I wanted to buy a fun game, but they were all about becoming a millionaire. They had nothing to do with my life." She decided to create a game closer to her own experiences.

Existensminimum simulates the struggles of those who live close to the poverty line. The object of the game is not to accumulate extreme wealth but rather to "survive" and perhaps save enough to gain a car, an education and other basic needs. Rather than buying and selling thousands of shares, players earn minimal income from social welfare, unemployment insurance, blueberry picking and temporary employment in nursing homes.

At the Nolia Trade Fair in 2003, the game was nominated for Best Innovation, but when Persson approached large game companies about publishing it, none expressed interest due to the game's downbeat theme. Instead, Persson and the Lindblats self-published 530 copies, and ordered a second print run when the first sold out.

In 2020, Västerbottens Mellanbygd called the game an "anonymous cult classic" that had seen a resurgence of interest due to economic hardships brought on by the COVID pandemic.
