= Burn the World =

Studio album by AC4
- Released: March 22, 2013
- Recorded: 2012
- Genre: Hardcore punk Punk
- Label: Ny Våg; Deathwish Inc.

AC4 chronology
| AC4 (2009) | Burn the World (2013) |

Burn the World is the second album by the Swedish hardcore punk band AC4, released on Ny Våg (Ny Våg #133) in Sweden and Deathwish Inc. (DW145) in the United States, in March 2013.

The title track was written after guitarist Karl Backman's visit to the Chernobyl Nuclear Power Plant.

== Track listing ==
All songs written by AC4.

1. "Curva del Diablo"
2. "Who's the Enemy"
3. "All Talked Out"
4. "Die Like a Dog"
5. "Morality Match"
6. "Bullet for Your Head"
7. "Don't Belong"
8. "Diplomacy Is Dead"
9. "Burn the World"
10. "Eye for an Eye"
11. "I Won't Play Along"
12. "Breakout"
13. "Extraordinary Rendition"
14. "I Don't Want It - I Don't Need It"
15. "Off the Hook"
16. "Left You Behind"

== Credits ==
- Dennis Lyxzén – vocals
- Karl Backman – guitar
- Christoffer Röstlund Jonsson – bass
- Jens Nordén – drums
- Fredrik Lyxzén - recording at Parasit Studios
- Robert Hurula - artwork

== Video ==
The official video for the track "Curva del Diablo" was filmed at a show at Verket in Umeå. It was directed by Robin Westman. A second video, for the title track "Burn the World," was released in May 2013. It was directed and animated by Jonathan Lindley.
