= What You Waiting For? (disambiguation) =

"What You Waiting For?" is a Gwen Stefani song.

What You Waiting For? may also refer to:

- "What You Waiting For" (Jeon Somi song), 2020
- What You Waiting For, the debut album of Mizz Nina
- "What You Waiting For?", a song by Sigala from Brighter Days
- "What You Waiting For?", a song by Lily Allen from No Shame
- "What You Waiting For", a song by Robert Palmer from Pride
- "What You Waiting For", a song by a South Korean artist Anda

== See also ==
- What Are You Waiting For? (disambiguation)
