= The Cross of My Calling =

Studio album by the (International) Noise Conspiracy
- Released: November 14, 2008
- Studios: Sunset Sound and Akademie Mathematique of Philosophical Sound Research, Los Angeles, California
- Genres: Arena rock, emo, anarcho-punk.
- Length: 49:03
- Labels: Burning Heart, American (Europe/Australia); Vagrant (United States/Canada); Shock (Australia)
- Producer: Rick Rubin

The (International) Noise Conspiracy chronology
Armed Love (2004)	The Cross of My Calling (2008)

Professional ratings
Aggregate scores
Source	Rating
Metacritic	63/100
Review scores
Source	Rating
AllMusic	0/5
Beyond Race Magazine	
AllMusic	0/5

The Cross of My Calling is the fourth and final studio album by the (International) Noise Conspiracy. It was recorded at Sunset Sound in Hollywood and is the band's second full-length album with producer Rick Rubin. It was released through Vagrant/American Recordings on November 25, 2008, in the US and through Burning Heart on November 14, 2008, in Europe.

AllMusic described the album as moving away from the band's usual retro garage rock to push toward arena rock, probably as a result of Rubin's direction and the clean production. Paste magazine gave the album a zero rating, sharply criticizing the clichéd political messages interlaced with emo and anarcho-punk music.

== Track listing ==
All tracks are written by the (International) Noise Conspiracy.

No.	Title	Length
1.	"Intro"	2:09
2.	"The Assassination of Myself"	3:28
3.	"Dustbins of History"	2:31
4.	"Arm Yourself"	3:22
5.	"Hiroshima Mon Amour"	3:31
6.	"Boredom of Safety"	2:58
7.	"Child of God"	4:58
8.	"Interlude"	1:41
9.	"I Am The Dynamite"	3:38
10.	"Washington Bullets"	2:27
11.	"Satan Made the Deal"	3:07
12.	"Storm the Gates of Beverly Hills"	3:35
13.	"Black September"	3:07
14.	"The Cross of My Calling"	8:39

== Personnel ==
Band

- Ludwig Dahlberg – drums, percussion
- Inge Johansson – bass
- Dennis Lyxzén – lead vocals, harmonica
- Lars Strömberg – guitars, backing vocals

Additional musicians

- Lisa Kekaula – backing vocals
- Sam Velde – backing vocals
- Kalle Jacobson – keyboards
- Lenny Castro – percussion

Production and design

- Hugo Sundkvist (Hitsville Graphics) – artwork, design
- Robert Pettersson – artwork (illustrations and drawings)
- Chris Holmes – sound engineer assistant
- Clifton Allen – sound engineer assistant
- Phillip Broussard Jr. – sound engineer assistant
- Sara Lynn Killion – sound engineer assistant
- Morgan Johansson (Moondog Entertainment) – management
- Trevor Silmser (Marathon Management) – co-management (for North America)
- Vlado Meller – mastering
- Mark Santangelo – mastering assistant
- Andrew Scheps – mixing
- Elin Berge – photography (band photo)
- Fredrik Lyxzén – pre-production assistant
- Mats Hammarström – pre-production assistant
- Måns Lundberg – pre-production assistant
- Rick Rubin – production
- Greg Fidelman – recording
- Jason Lader – additional recording
