= Sibille Attar =

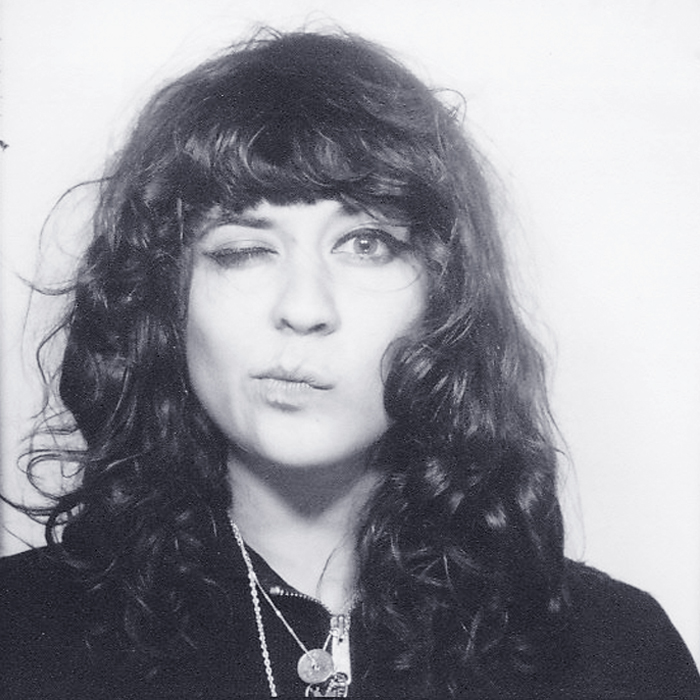

Background information
- Also known as: Little Red Corvette
- Born: 27 November 1981 (age 44); Örebro, Sweden
- Origin: Swedish artist of French origin
- Genres: Indie pop
- Occupations: Singer, songwriter
- Years active: 2001 – present
- Label: Pnkslm Recordings
- Website: www.sibilleattar.com

Sibille Attar (born 27 November 1981 in Örebro, Sweden) is a Swedish singer and songwriter and producer of French origin. She released her self produced EP The Flower's Bed on the Stranded record label in 2012, which earned her a Grammy nomination for "Best Newcomer" that year. It was followed by her self-produced debut album Sleepyhead in 2013, also on Stranded. In 2018, she released the six-track EP Paloma's Hand on indie label Pnkslm Recordings.

Attar was born in Örebro and moved to Stockholm at the age of 15. She was a member of various musical bands including Stockholm-based band The Tourettes from 2001 to 2008, and Norrköping-founded band Speedmarket Avenue from 2005 to 2009. In 2010, she became a member of the band [ingenting]. She is also active under the name Little Red Corvette. Attar has collaborated with a number of other artists such as Camera Obscura, David Lindh, Jonathan Johansson, Shadow Shadow and The Bear Quartet.

== Discography ==
=== Albums ===
- 2013: Sleepyhead
- 2021: A History of Silence
- 2023: Sårad Ängel
- 2024: BRUTAL

Album	Peak positions	Notes
Album	SWE	Notes
The Flower's Bed (EP): Release date: 2012; Record label: Stranded Rekords; Format: CD/vinyl		
Sleepyhead: Release date: 20 February 2013; Record label: Stranded; Format: CD/vinyl	7	
Paloma's Hand (EP): Release date: 27 April 2018; Record label: PNKSLM Recordings; Format: Vinyl		
A History of Silence: Release date: 26 February 2021; Record label: PNKSLM Recordings; Format: Vinyl		
Sårad Ängel: Release date: 20 October 2023; Record label: Selfreleased; Format: Vinyl		
BRUTAL: Release date: 26 April 2024; Record label: Selfreleased; Format: Vinyl		

=== EPs ===
- 2012: The Flower's Bed
- 2018: Paloma's Hand
- 2022: Lost Tracks 2012-2022
