= Saturday Night (The Bear Quartet album) =

Studio album by The Bear Quartet
- Released: September 21, 2005
- Genre: Indie rock
- Length: 45:32

The Bear Quartet chronology
| Angry Brigade (2003) | Saturday Night (2005) | Eternity Now (2006) |

Saturday Night is an album by the Bear Quartet, released in 2005.

== Track listing ==
1. "I Know My Owner" – 4:19
2. "Birds Are Singing Deep Within the Greenery" – 3:43
3. "Loneliness Abandons the Lonely" – 1:50
4. "I Have an Itch" – 2:26
5. "I Speak Much English" – 3:44
6. "Little Ghost" – 4:45
7. "Weakling Keep Blinking" – 6:06
8. "The Supremes" – 2:17
9. "Today I Will Dress Up" – 2:56
10. "Your Name Here" – 5:53
11. "Class Trip" – 3:07
12. "Death to The Bear Quartet" – 4:26
