= A New Morning, Changing Weather =

Studio album by the (International) Noise Conspiracy
- Released: October 23, 2001
- Recorded: May 2001 – June 2001 at Gröndahl Studio, Stockholm, Sweden
- Genres: Indie rock; punk rock; garage rock
- Length: 41:42
- Label: Epitaph
- Producer: Jari Haapalainen

The (International) Noise Conspiracy chronology
Survival Sickness (2000)	A New Morning, Changing Weather (2001)	Armed Love (2004)

Professional ratings
Review scores
Source	Rating
AllMusic	4/5 stars
Rock Sound	3/5 stars

A New Morning, Changing Weather is the third studio album by the (International) Noise Conspiracy.

== Track listing ==
All tracks are written by The (International) Noise Conspiracy.

No.	Title	Length
1.	"A Northwest Passage"	3:55
2.	"Up for Sale"	3:27
3.	"Bigger Cages, Longer Chains"	4:21
4.	"Breakout 2001"	3:43
5.	"A Body Treatise"	3:24
6.	"Born Into a Mess"	5:21
7.	"New Empire Blues"	3:19
8.	"Capitalism Stole My Virginity"	3:38
9.	"Last Century Promise"	6:10
10.	"Dead Language of Love"	4:24
11.	"A New Morning, Changing Weather"	4:27

== Personnel ==
The (International) Noise Conspiracy

- Ludwig Dahlberg – drums
- Inge Johansson – bass guitar, backing vocals
- Lars Strömberg – guitar, backing vocals
- Dennis Lyxzén – vocals, tambourine
- Sara Almgren – organ, guitar

=== Additional personnel ===
- Jari Haapalainen – producer, engineer, mastering, extra percussion, additional guitar on track 10
- Pelle Gunnerfeldt – Engineer, Mastering
- Johan Gustavsson – Engineer, Backing Vocals on Track 4 and Track 7
- Sven-Eric Dahlberg – Piano on Track 6, Rhodes Piano on Track 3
- Karl Olsson – Additional Synth on Track 11
- Björn Yttling – Horn arrangements, Piano on Track 7
- Jonas Kullhammar – Saxophone on Track 3, Saxophone solo on Track 7
- Markus Olsson – Saxophone on Track 3
- Jonas Lidström – Backing Vocals on Track 3, Track 9 Track 11, Track 4 and Track 1
- Mattias Lidström – Backing Vocals on Track 3, Track 9, Track 11, Track 4 and Track 1
- Peder Stenberg – Backing Vocals on Track 3, Track 9, Track 11, Track 4 and Track 1
- Liv-Marit Bergman – Backing Vocals on Track 4
- Maria Andersson – Backing Vocals on Track 4
- Hugo Sundkvist – Layout, Artwork
