= Family Affair (The Bear Quartet album) =

Studio album by The Bear Quartet
- Released: 1993
- Length: 26:21

The Bear Quartet chronology
Cosy Den (1993)	Family Affair (1993)	Everybody Else (1995)

Professional ratings
Review scores
Source	Rating
Allmusic	link

Family Affair is an alternative indie-rock album released in 1993 by Norwegian band the Bear Quartet.

== Track listing ==
1. "Carsick" – 3:35
2. "Big Stretch" – 2:42
3. "Revisited" – 3:37
4. "Slope Goings" – 1:30
5. "Who's Knocking" – 2:32
6. "Left on the Bank of the River" – 3:29
7. "Smallest" – 2:16
8. "Boss Dawn" – 1:26
9. "Cross Yawn" – 0:52
10. "Twinreceiver" – 4:22
