= Mattias Alkberg =

Swedish poet, songwriter and musician (born 1969)

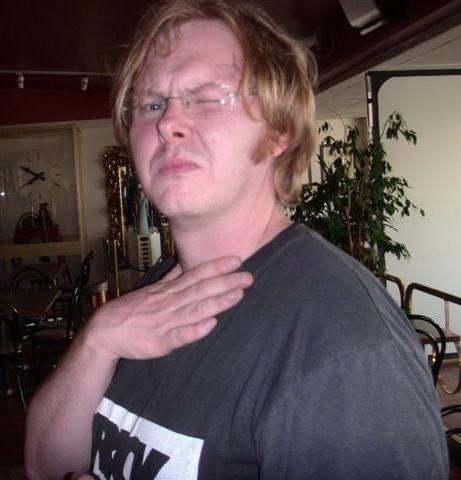
- Mattias "Matti" Alkberg, at the Accelerator festival in Stockholm 2005-07-07

Background information
- Birth name: Mattias Hans Alkberg
- Born: January 8, 1969 (age 56); Luleå, Sweden
- Genres: Punk rock, Rock music
- Occupation(s): Musician, Songwriter, Writer
- Instrument(s): Vocals, Guitar,
- Years active: 1989–present
- Labels: A West Side Fabrication; Ny Våg
- Member of: Mattias Alkberg BD
- Formerly of: The Bear Quartet

Mattias Alkberg (born January 8, 1969), sometimes known as Matti Alkberg, is a Swedish poet, songwriter and musician. He has released four poetry books and more than a dozen records with his two bands The Bear Quartet and Mattias Alkberg BD.

== Books ==
- 1992: Separerade Ägg (Wahlström & Widstrand)
- 1997: Röda Stjärna (Wahlström & Widstrand)
- 2000: Jag var en av er (Wahlström & Widstrand)
- 2004: Göta Kanal (Wahlström & Widstrand)
- 2011: Era Svin (Wahlström & Widstrand)

== Discography ==
Solo

- 2009: Nerverna (Ny Våg)
- 2011: Allt det här (Split album with Pascal)
- 2011: Anarkist (Ny Våg)
- 2013: Mattias Alkbergs begravning
- 2014: Södra Sverige
- 2015: Personer
- 2017: Åtminstone artificiell intelligens
- 2020: Bodensia
- 2021: Häxor
- 2024: DRAKE

Mattias Alkberg BD

- 2004: Tunaskolan
- 2005: Jag ska bli en bättre vän (A West Side Fabrication)
- 2006: Ditt hjärta är en stjärna (A West Side Fabrication)

The Bear Quartet

- 1992: Penny Century (A West Side Fabrication)
- 1993: Cosy Den (A West Side Fabrication)
- 1993: Family Affair (A West Side Fabrication)
- 1995: Everybody Else (A West Side Fabrication)
- 1995: Holy Holy (A West Side Fabrication)
- 1997: Moby Dick (A West Side Fabrication)
- 1998: Personality Crisis (A West Side Fabrication)
- 2000: My War (A West Side Fabrication)
- 2001: Gay Icon (A West Side Fabrication)
- 2002: Ny våg (A West Side Fabrication)
- 2003: Early Years (A West Side Fabrication)
- 2003: Angry Brigade (A West Side Fabrication)
- 2005: Saturday Night (A West Side Fabrication)
- 2006: Eternity Now (A West Side Fabrication)
- 2009: 89 (A West Side Fabrication)
- 2010: Monty Python (A West Side Fabrication)
