= Knugen Faller =

Swedish punk rock band

Knugen Faller, is a Swedish punk band from Skellefteå. Formed in 2003. Their style has been compared with Doktor Kosmos, but more punk.

Knugen Faller roughly translates into The King Falls. The deliberately misspelled Kungen, Swedish for king, is a common moniker for the king of Sweden, Karl XVI Gustav, referencing the fact that he is dyslexic.

== History ==
The band formed in late spring 2003 at Umeå's Food Not Bombs, a place where many local punks meet. Three of the members were living together in the same apartment at the time, and some of the members were already playing together in other bands. Since all the band members had been playing in various bands before, the idea was to start a band where every member had to start from scratch by playing an instrument they never played before.

Some of the members also play in Totalt Jävla Mörker. Inge "Inge Ansvar" Johansson also plays in The (International) noise conspiracy.

=== Members ===
- Anna "Silvia Sate" Philipsson - Vocals/Tambourine
- Robert "Garderobert" Tenevall - bass guitar
- Inge "Fejk-Inge Ansvar" Johansson - Guitar and vocals
- Fredrik "Fredda Frekvent" Lindkvist - drums

== Discography ==
- Skellefte stadshotell EP (2004) 7-inch EP
- Inte som ni (2005) 7-inch EP
- Lugna favoriter (2007) LP
