= Welfare Problems =

2003 album by Swedish punk rock band Randy

- Standard cover art for Welfare Problems

Studio album by Randy
- Released: May 6, 2003
- Genres: Punk rock; garage punk; garage rock
- Length: 31:47
- Label: Burning Heart Records
- Producers: Pelle Gunnerfeldt; Jocke Åhlund; Randy

Randy chronology
The Human Atom Bombs (2001)	Welfare Problems (2003)	Randy the Band (2005)

Welfare Problems is an album by Randy, released in 2003 by Burning Heart Records. It contains twelve tracks, including the single "X-Ray Eyes," which, alongside the closing track "Dirty and Cheap," also appears on the soundtrack of the Swedish black comedy Smala Sussie.

== Critical reception ==
Professional ratings
Review scores
Source	Rating
AllMusic	4/5 stars
Alternative Press	5/5

Welfare Problems has received critical acclaim. Johnny Loftus of AllMusic granted Welfare Problems 4 out of 5 stars, stating that the album "finds Randy's ideology undiluted by the addition of buzzing guitar hooks and shoutable choruses to its punk rock roots." In the review, Loftus positively likens Randy to punk rock bands like Ramones and garage rock bands like The Modern Lovers, complementing Randy's "staunchly socialist stumping" in their lyrics and citing the band's clear draws from Eddie Cochran and Roger Daltrey as lyrical and stylistic influences. Loftus also compliments the album's lead producer, Pelle Gunnerfeldt, for producing a sound "with touches of fuzz and a perfect mix of lead and supporting vocals." The review concludes with Loftus stating, "Randy may want the kids to rise up, but the band knows that shouting and dancing come first." Loftus cites "A Man in Uniform," "X-Ray Eyes," "Welfare Problems," and "Dirty and Cheap" as the standout tracks.

In his review of the album, Chris O'Toole of The Bedlam Society rewarded the album 8.5 out of 10 stars, favorably comparing Randy to other bands that were part of "the recent garage influenced Rock N' Roll revival," including fellow Swedish bands The Hives, Refused, and The (International) Noise Conspiracy. O'Toole praises Randy's growth over their career since their 1994 debut album There's No Way We're Gonna Fit In, and he compliments Randy's "maniacally energetic" style. While pointing out that several of the songs on the album have more "reflective" and "personal" subject matter than others, he says, "one of the most endearing qualities of this Swedish quartet is that they are not afraid to showcase their quirky and fun side along with the harsh reality of their [sociopolitical] concerns." O'Toole cites "Cheap Thrills" and "X-Ray Eyes" as stand-out tracks, calling the latter "[a rival] and [...] certainly on par with "Hey Ya!" by Outkast for best song of the year."

== Track listing ==
All music is composed by Randy (Johan Brändström, Fredrik Granberg, Stefan Granberg, Johan Gustafsson).

Track listing for Welfare Problems
No.	Title	Producer(s)	Length
1.	"Dirty Tricks"	Pelle Gunnerfeldt	2:11
2.	"A Man in Uniform"	Pelle Gunnerfeldt	3:12
3.	"Bad, Bad, Bad"	Pelle Gunnerfeldt	2:49
4.	"We're All Fucked Up, More or Less"	Pelle Gunnerfeldt	2:14
5.	"Cheap Thrills"	Jocke Åhlund	3:41
6.	"X-Ray Eyes"	Pelle Gunnerfeldt	3:26
7.	"Welfare Problems"	Pelle Gunnerfeldt	1:55
8.	"Cheater"	Pelle Gunnerfeldt	2:12
9.	"Ruff Stuff"	Pelle Gunnerfeldt	2:17
10.	"My Heart, My Enemy"	Pelle Gunnerfeldt	2:30
11.	"Devilish"	Pelle Gunnerfeldt	2:36
12.	"Dirty and Cheap"	Pelle Gunnerfeldt	3:09
Total length:			32:06

== Information ==
- recorded at Studio Gröndahl
- all tracks except for "Cheap Thrills" produced by Pelle Gunnerfeldt
- "Cheap Thrills" produced by Jocke Åhlund
- Mixed and engineered by Pelle Gunnerfeldt
- artwork by Henrik Walse
- released by Burning Heart on May 6, 2003
- performed by Randy

== Credits ==
- Fredrik Granberg - drums
- Johan Gustafsson - bass, background vocals
- Stefan Granberg - lead vocals, guitar
- Johan Brändström - guitar, background and lead vocals
- Jennie Asplund - background vocals
- Johanna Asplund - background vocals
- Calle Olsson - background vocals
- Randy - Composer, Engineer, Primary Artist, Producer
