= Survival Sickness =

Studio album by the (International) Noise Conspiracy
- Released: May 9, 2000
- Genres: Punk rock, rock and roll, garage rock
- Length: 35:23
- Labels: Epitaph, Burning Heart
- Producer: Jari Haapalainen

The (International) Noise Conspiracy chronology
The First Conspiracy (1999)	Survival Sickness (2000)	A New Morning, Changing Weather (2001)

Survival Sickness is the first studio album by the (International) Noise Conspiracy, released in 2000.

== Critical reception ==
Professional ratings
Review scores
Source	Rating
AllMusic	4/5 stars
The Encyclopedia of Popular Music	3/5 stars
Kerrang!	5/5 stars
Metal Hammer	9/10
Pitchfork	4.2/10
The Province	3/4 stars
Punknews.org	4/5 stars

The Washington Post wrote that "even the Conspiracy's most energetic broadsides seem more well-meaning than incendiary." CMJ New Music Report called the album "astounding," and noted the "nearly flawless thematic progression as a call-to-arms." The Chicago Tribune called it "a truly volatile Molotov cocktail of '60s garage-rock and Stooges-style punk."

== Track listing ==
All tracks are written by the (International) Noise Conspiracy.

No.	Title	Length
1.	"I Wanna Know About U"	2:30
2.	"The Subversive Sound"	2:38
3.	"Smash it Up"	3:15
4.	"(I've Got) Survival Sickness"	4:09
5.	"The Reproduction of Death"	3:48
6.	"Impostor Costume"	2:57
7.	"Intermission"	2:24
8.	"Only Lovers Left Alive"	2:42
9.	"Do I Have to Spell It Out?"	4:00
10.	"Will It Ever Be Quiet?"	3:46
11.	"Enslavement Blues"	3:19
12.	"Ready Steady Go!"	4:15
