= INVSN =

Swedish punk band

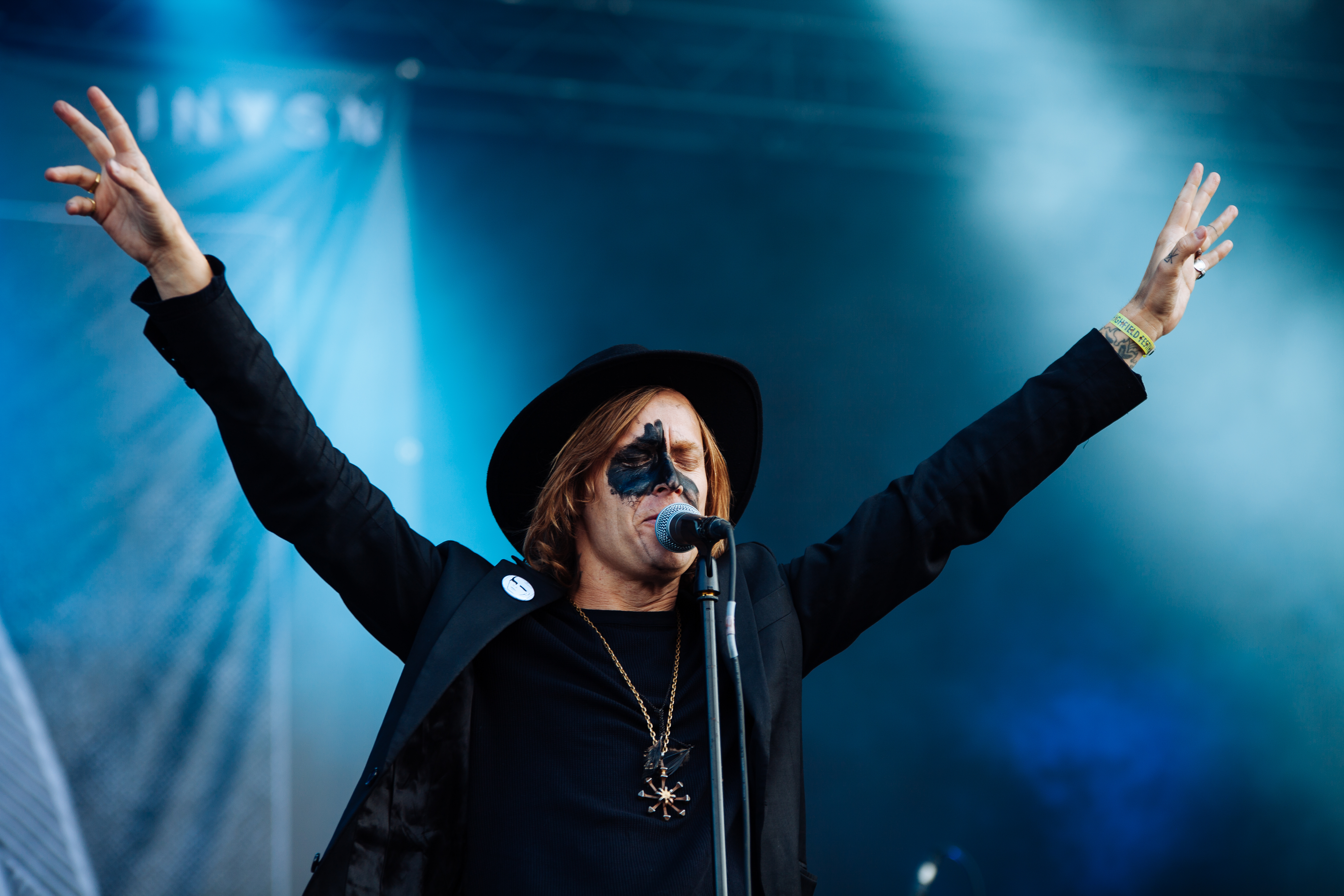
- INVSN at Highfield Festival, Germany in 2014

Background information
- Also known as: The Lost Patrol (1998–2004); The Lost Patrol Band (2004–2008); Invasionen (2008–2013)
- Origin: Umeå, Sweden
- Genres: Post punk; industrial rock; new wave; punk rock; power pop; folk
- Years active: 1998–2026 (hiatus)
- Labels: Clouds Hill, Razor & Tie, Ny Våg, Dine Alone, Sonic, Columbia, Burning Heart, Whoa Dad!, April77, Startracks
- Spinoffs: AC4, Backengrillen, Vännäs Kasino
- Spinoff of: Refused, Saidiwas, DS13, Regulators, Deportees, Masshysteri
- Members: Dennis Lyxzén; Sara Almgren; André Sandström; Christina Karlsson; Anders Stenberg
- Past members: Robert Pettersson; Richard Österman; Kajsa Bergsten; Stefan Granberg; Daniel Berglund; Jonas Lidström
- Website: invsnmusic.com

INVSN (pronounced "Invasion") is a Swedish post-punk band from Umeå. Originally formed as The Lost Patrol as a solo project for Dennis Lyxzén, already known for the punk bands Refused and The (International) Noise Conspiracy, the project's early music was notably more folkish and softer than his prior music endeavors.

The members have all played in influential punk and rock bands from Sweden. Sara Almgren used to be in the first Swedish all-female straight-edge band The Doughnuts. She later played keyboard and guitar in The (International) Noise Conspiracy, played in bands like The Vicious and Masshysteri, and toured with Marit Bergman and Sahara Hotnights. Dennis Lyxzen is most known for being the lead vocalist in Refused but has also played in bands like The (International) Noise Conspiracy, AC4 and many more. He has also been a touring member of The Bloody Beetroots. Anders Stenberg is a member of acclaimed Swedish band the Deportees and also a touring member of Lykke Li's band. Christina Karlsson, besides playing in INVSN, also plays with bands and artist such as Frida Selander, Tiger Forest Cat and Honungsvägen. Andre Sandström hails from Swedish hardcore thrashers DS-13 and has also played with The Vicious and Ux Vileheads.

== History ==
=== Origins ===
The band had previously chosen the Lost Patrol Band moniker; however, they were forced to change this to Invasionen as the American group, The Lost Patrol has the North American trademark of the name. While the name changed, so did the music, and the band started to write in Swedish.

In 1999, Lyxzén put together a release titled Songs in the Key of Resistance which was written in the political vein. The album received mixed reactions with the critics lamenting the album for straying from its creator's punk roots. Others were impressed by Lyxzén's ability to diversify his musical output. The Lost Patrol returned in 2003 with Songs About Running Away. According to Lyxzén, the album had been supposed to be just as subversive and political as his previous album, yet due to relationship problems, it ended up being an emotional outburst. Guests such as David Sandström (Refused), Stefan Granberg (Randy) and Lisa Miskovsky helped to make this album one of Lyxzén's most experimental.

In 2005, Burning Heart Records reported that The Lost Patrol has grown from Lyxzén's solo project into a full-fledged band. This is reflected in the title of the 2005 album The Lost Patrol Band. The album also represents a further change in style, this time encompassing the upbeat sounds of 1970s/80s punk and power pop. In 2013 the group signed to Razor & Tie and changed their name to INVSN.

In 2010 Invasionen released their debut album Hela Världen Brinner on Sony Music in Sweden. A vinyl version of the record was released on Dennis' own label Ny Våg Records. Shortly after the record was released, Robert Pettersson left the band to focus on his band Masshysteri. Richard Österman replaced him on bass. Since the album was only released in Sweden and the lyrics were in Swedish they mainly just touring Sweden but also did some shows in Spain. The first album Hela Världen Brinner could be described as a tribute to early Swedish punk rock.

In the fall of 2011 the sophomore album Saker Som jag Sagt Till Natten was released once again on Sony Music. The album was well received in Sweden, and shortly after Sara Almgren from Masshysteri had joined the band on bass, while Österman had moved to guitar due to Anders Stenberg's touring duties with Lykke Li. The album had a darker and more serious tone then the previous album. In the fall of 2011 they also did a tour of China before touring Scandinavia.

In 2012 the band was largely on a break due to Dennis Lyxzén's commitment to the Refused reunion. They still managed to play over 20 shows and write the material that would end up on their next record.

=== INVSN ===
In 2013 the group recorded their third album and signed to Razor & Tie and changed their name to INVSN (Pronounced "Invasion"). The record, also titled INVSN, was recorded in both English for an international Release and Swedish for a domestic release in Sweden. It received a rating score of eight from PopMatters.

The English version of the album was released on 24 September and the band set out on a tour in North America supporting Minus the Bear. Before the tour, Richard Österman stepped down from touring duties and Christina Karlsson and Kajsa Bergsten joined. During 2013 and 2014, the band did over 110 shows all over the world, including two tours of North America, a trip to Cuba, and several European tours, one with Against Me!. The album in Europe but not much happened in America due to a lack of interest on the labels part. They ended 2014 with releasing a limited vinyl 7-inch on Sony Music with the song "Hjärtat" and a split 7-inch with Sister Mystery from Los Angeles. In November, they did a short tour of the UK with Echo and The Bunnymen.

2015 was a quiet year for INVSN due to a new Refused record. In the fall of 2015 they however did a short Scandinavian tour together with The Soft Moon.

In 2016 INVSN announced their return with new music. They got signed to new Swedish label Woah Dad! in Scandinavia and released their first single from the upcoming album The Beautiful Stories, "Immer Zu", on 21 October in the Nordic countries. They also announced that they are free from the Razor and Tie contract and working on getting the music released in the rest of the world.

The band eventually changed to a new record label, Clouds Hill Music. On June 3, 2022, the band released their 3rd studio album under the INVSN moniker, Let The Night Love You, with two digital bonus tracks offered to those who purchased the album directly through the record label.

== Members ==
Current members

- Dennis Lyxzén – lead vocals, guitars (1999–present)
- Anders Stenberg – guitars, keyboards, backing vocals (2004–present)
- André Sandström – drums, percussion, backing vocals (2004–present)
- Sara Almgren – bass, backing vocals (2011–present)
- Christina Karlsson – keyboards, synthesizers, backing vocals (2013–present)

Former members

- Daniel Berglund – percussion (2004–2005)
- Jonas Lidström – keyboards, organ, backing vocals (2004–2005)
- Stefan Granberg – bass, guitars, backing vocals (2004–2005)
- Robert Pettersson – bass, backing vocals (2004–2010)
- Richard Österman – bass, guitar backing vocals (2010–2013)
- Kajsa Bergsten – guitars, backing vocals (2013–2015)

== Discography ==
=== Albums ===
As The Lost Patrol

- Songs In The Key Of Resistance (1999)
- Songs About Running Away (2003)

As The Lost Patrol Band

- The Lost Patrol Band (2005)
- Automatic (2006)

As Invasionen:

- Hela Världen Brinner (2010) Ny Våg
- Saker Som Jag Sagt Till Natten (2011)

As INVSN:

- INVSN (2013) Razor & Tie
- The Beautiful Stories (2017) Woah Dad!
- Let The Night Love You (2022) Clouds Hill Music

=== Singles ===
As Invasionen:

- St (2009) April77 (Originally intended to be a Lost Patrol Band 7-inch)
- Får Aldrig Tro (2009) Sony Music
- Arvegods (2011) Ny Våg Records Scharinska Vinyl 12-inch
- Sanningsenligt (2011) Sony Music Digital

As INVSN:

- Ner I Mörkret – Daniel Lissvik Remix (2013) Sony Music Digital
- Down In The Shadows (2013) Razor and Tie
- Hjärtat (2014) Sony Music Limited vinyl 7-inch
- Split 7-inch with Sister Mystery (2014) Beyond Ideas Limited Vinyl 7-inch
- Immer Zu (2016) Noah Dad Limited vinyl 7-inch

== See also ==
- Ny Våg
- Step Forward
- Refused
- AC4
- The (International) Noise Conspiracy
- Razor & Tie
- Burning Heart Records
- Epitaph Records
