= Masshysteri =

Swedish punk band formed in 2007

- Origin: Umeå, Sweden
- Genres: Punk rock • post-punk
- Years active: 2007–2010
- Labels: Ny Våg
- Spinoffs: INVSN, Cross
- Spinoff of: The Vicious
- Past members: Robert "Hurula" Pettersson; Sara Almgren; Kajsa Bergsten; Erik Viklund
- Website: myspace.com/masshysteri}

Masshysteri (English: Mass hysteria) was a swedish punk band, formed in Umeå in 2007. The group consisted of Robert Pettersson (rhythm guitar, vocals), Sara Almgren (bass guitar, vocals), Kajsa Bergsten (lead guitar) and Erik Viklund (drums)

== History ==
Robert Pettersson, Erik Viklund and Sara Almgren previously played in the punk band The Vicious. The lyrics were English and they toured in the U.S. When The Vicious drummer André Sandström left the band, they had to find a stand-in. At the same point, they decided to write lyrics in Swedish. Erik took over the drums and Kajsa Bergsten joined the group on guitar. They released two 7"s and two full-length albums before they decided to disband. According to Dennis Lyxzén (their record company manager), internal problems between band members lead to the group breaking up.

== Members ==
- Robert (Hurula) Pettersson - rhythm guitar, vocals
- Sara Almgren - bass guitar, vocals
- Kajsa Bergsten - lead guitar
- Erik Viklund - drums

== Discography ==
- Vår del av stan (2008)
  - Ny Våg (Sweden) – CD/LP
  - Feral Ward (US) – CD/LP
  - Nada Nada Discos (Brazil) – LP
- Masshysteri (2010)
  - Ny Våg (Sweden) – CD/LP
  - Feral Ward (US) – CD/LP
  - Nada Nada Discos (Brazil) – LP
  - Angry Youth (Indonesia) – tape

=== Singles ===
- "Paranoid" 7" (2008, Hell, Yes! Records)
- "Monoton Tid" 7" (2008, Hjernespind/Feral Ward)
- "Dom Kan Inte Höra Musiken" CDr (2010, self-released)

=== Compilations ===
- Masshysteri (2013, Crysis)
  - Both recordings were re-released on one tape; Vår del av stan at A side, and self-titled album at B side.
