= You Can't Keep a Good Band Down =

1998 album by Swedish punk rock band Randy

Studio album by Randy
- Released: 1998
- Recorded: May 1998
- Studio: Das Boot Rec & Play, Stockholm, Sweden
- Genre: Punk rock, pop punk
- Length: 34:44
- Label: G7 Welcoming Committee Records; Ampersand Records
- Producer: Pelle Gunnerfeldt

Randy chronology
The Rest Is Silence (1996)	You Can't Keep a Good Band Down (1998)	The Human Atom Bombs (2001)

You Can't Keep a Good Band Down is an album by Randy, released in 1998 on Ampersand Records.

== Critical reception ==
Professional ratings
Review scores
Source	Rating
AllMusic	4.5/5 stars
PunkNews	4.5/5 stars

You Can't Keep a Good Band Down received critical acclaim upon its release. AllMusic reviewer Kurt Morris, who awarded the album 4.5 out of 5 stars, credited the band for "creatively displaying a mix of infectious grooves, '50s influence, anti-establishment energy, and much more," stating that the band's harmonies and melodies are "remarkable for a punk act." Lyrically, Morris compliments the band for "[expressing] their anarchist views […] in a way that is honest and open," as well as for including "silly stories" in songs such as "The Exorcist," "Me and the Boys," and "Randy, I Don't Need You." Morris concludes his review by stating, "Randy seems to have made a very successful album that will most likely be overlooked by many, but it's their loss, as all the pieces truly are in place." Morris distinguishes "Holy Shit," "The Exorcist," and "They Fear Us" as standout tracks.

In a retrospective review for PunkNews published four years after the album's release, Dubar also awards the album with 4.5 out of 5 stars. He points out the band's drastic "reinvention" compared to their previous style, which was more in line with skate punk outfits like Satanic Surfers. On the contrary, Dubar points out that You Can't Keep a Good Band Down is "noticeably less aggressive, much more catchy, and that's not a bad thing at all." He positively likens the band's reinvention to Bad Religion, "but with less big words, and they seem to be having a LOT more fun." He compliments Randy's "straightforward" lyrical style and avoidance of metaphors and poetry in favor of "tackling realistic ideas and offering real-world solutions." Dubar distinguishes "The Exorcist," "Superstar," "Randy, I Don't Need You," "They Fear Us," and "Working Class Radio" as stand-out tracks.

== Track listing ==
All music is composed by Randy (Johan Brändström, Fredrik Granberg, Stefan Granberg, Johan Gustafsson)

Track listing for Randy the Band
No.	Title	Length
1.	"Holy Shit"	0:56
2.	"Little Toulouse"	3:10
3.	"The Exorcist"	2:25
4.	"Me and the Boys"	3:16
5.	"Epidemic Ignorance"	3:18
6.	"Superstar"	2:18
7.	"Step Out Side"	1:45
8.	"Randy, I Don't Need You"	3:25
9.	"They Fear Us"	2:40
10.	"You Are What You Fight For"	2:45
11.	"Powergame"	2:32
12.	"Now and Forever"	2:51
13.	"Working Class Radio"	3:28
Total length:		34:44

Deluxe edition bonus tracks
No.	Title	Length
14.	"Out of Nothing Comes Nothing"	3:38
15.	"Fucked Up World"	1:38
Total length:		40:00

== Information ==
- Recorded at Das Boot Rec & Play by Pelle Gunnerfeldt (of Fireside)
- Produced by Randy, Jejo Perkovic, Pelle Gunnerfeldt
- Mixed by Pelle Gunnerfeldt
- Mastered by Pelle Henricsson
- Released by Ampersand Records in 1998
- Re-released by Burning Heart Records in 2002 with inclusion of both deluxe edition tracks
- Cover designed by Jonas Berglund and Stefan Granberg

== Credits ==
- Fredrik Granberg - drums
- Johan Gustafsson - bass, background vocals
- Stefan Granberg - lead vocals, guitar
- Johan Brändström - guitar, background and lead vocals
- Per Nordmark (of Fireside) - maracas on "Randy, I Don't Need You"
- Jejo Perkovic - tambourine and drums on "Randy, I Don't Need You", producer
- Randy - composer, engineer, primary artist, producer
