= Inge Johansson =

Swedish musician (born 1977)

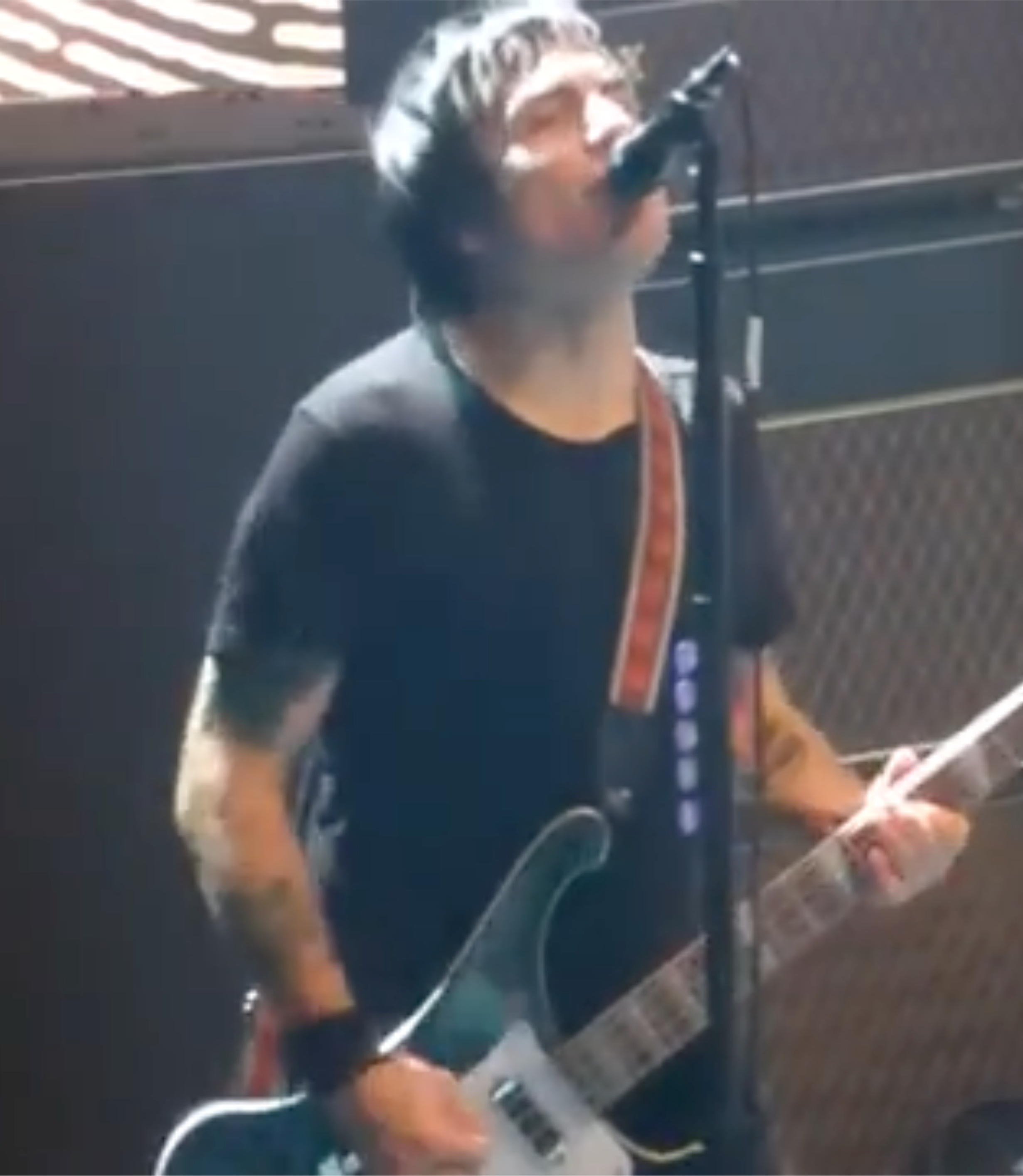
- Johansson performing with Against Me! in 2017

Background information
- Born: Inge Rolf Johansson; 10 May 1977 (age 49); Skellefteå, Sweden
- Genres: Punk rock, rock, hardcore punk
- Instruments: Bass guitar, vocals, guitar
- Years active: 1997–present
- Labels: Ny Våg; American Recordings; Epitaph

Inge Rolf Johansson (/ˈɪŋɡeɪ/) (born 10 May 1977) is a Swedish musician. He is best known for his time playing bass in bands such as Against Me! and The (International) Noise Conspiracy, of which he was a founding member. Before forming The (International) Noise Conspiracy, Johansson was one of the many bass players that played in hardcore band Refused.

== History ==
Johansson was the singer of the hardcore band Totalt Jävla Mörker (a band heavily influenced by Discharge, Norwegian Black Metal and industrial music), which he formed in his hometown Skellefteå in 1997. Johansson recorded and toured as an active member with both Totalt Jävla Mörker and The (International) Noise Conspiracy until 2005, when he left Totalt Jävla Mörker due to lack of time and internal disagreement about the band's future musical direction. In 2003, he formed Knugen Faller, a punk band where he played guitar and worked as the main songwriter. Knugen Faller split up in 2005 after two EPs, one LP and several tours around Scandinavia.

Johansson was a stand-in and studio bass player for various others, including The Lost Patrol Band and Imperial State Electric, and has also worked as a record producer. In 2005, Johansson started the label Ny Våg together with Dennis Lyxzén, and toured as a DJ on a regular basis. Between 2009 and 2010, he played in Swedish soul/rock/hiphop-artist Adiam Dymott's backing band with Thomas Rusiak, among various others.

The (International) Noise Conspiracy recorded and played more than 700 shows worldwide as an active band between 1998 and 2009, and recorded two of their albums with producer Rick Rubin for Rubin's label American Recordings.

In 2011, Johansson teamed up with ex-Hellacopters-frontman Nicke Andersson to form a band called Alonzo & Fas 3. During the same year Johansson started to work as a touring member of Brazilian electro outfit CSS. Johansson played bass for CSS until the end of 2012.

In 2012, Johansson played bass in English/German power pop band "Cryssis", featuring Vom Ritchie (drummer of Die Toten Hosen) and the same year, he was also in a Swedish street punk band called "Stilett".

On 29 August 2013 Johansson was announced as the new bass player for Against Me!. He would go on to play over 500 shows with the band, touring globally and playing on the band's 2016 album Shape Shift with Me. On 21 June 2018 Johansson was replaced in Against Me! by Andrew Seward, his predecessor. Announcing the split on his Instagram page, Johannson noted he "was a fan of the band before [he] joined, and [he] will always support them."

== Band chronology ==
- 1997–2005: Totalt Jävla Mörker
- 1998–2009: The (International) Noise Conspiracy
- 2003–2005: Knugen Faller
- 2007–2013: The Most
- 2011: Alonzo & Fas 3
- 2011–2012: CSS
- 2012: Cryssis, Stilett
- 2013–2018: Against Me!
- 2024: Attentat
- 2025: Vägsjäl
