= Hortlax =

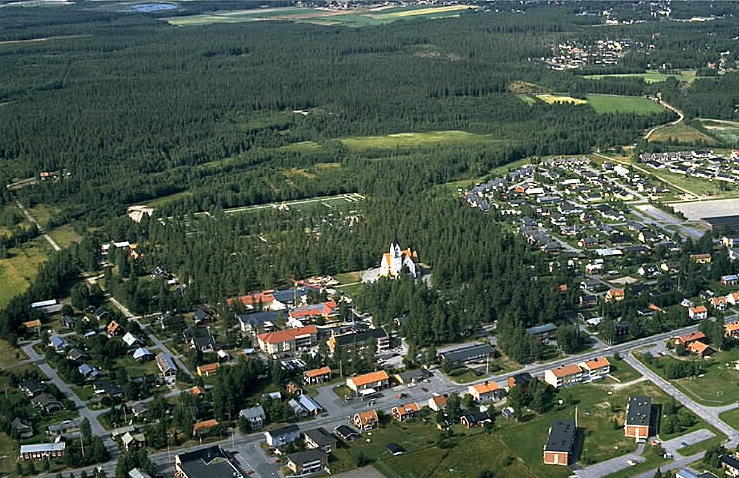

- Location within Norrbotten Location within Sweden
- Coordinates: 65°17′N 21°23′E
- Country: Sweden
- Province: Norrbotten
- County: Norrbotten County
- Municipality: Piteå Municipality

Area
  - Total: 1.49 km^{2} (0.58 sq mi)

Population (31 December 2010)
  - Total: 1,248
  - Density: 838/km^{2} (2,170/sq mi)
- Time zone: UTC+1 (CET)
  - Summer (DST): UTC+2 (CEST)

Hortlax (Swedish pronunciation: [ˈhʊ̌ʈːlaks]) is a locality situated in Piteå Municipality, Norrbotten County, Sweden with 1,248 inhabitants in 2010.
