= Sleepyhead (album) =

Studio album by Sibille Attar
- Released: 20 February 2013
- Recorded: 2012–2013
- Label: Stranded

Sleepyhead is the debut studio album by Swedish singer Sibille Attar. It was released in 2013 through Stranded label.

== Track listing ==
1. "Go On" (3:19)
2. "Alcoholics" (3:07)
3. "Julian! I Want To Be a Dancer!" (2:35)
4. "The Day" (6:03)
5. "Some Home" (4:04)
6. "To Turn Half Blue" (4:30)
7. "Come Night" (3:29)
8. "Hotel Room" (3:42)
9. "The Rules" (6:08)
10. "For Evelina" (4:09)

== Charts ==
Chart (2013)	Peak position
Swedish Albums (Sverigetopplistan)	7
