= Penny Century (The Bear Quartet album) =

Studio album by the Bear Quartet
- Released: October 20, 1992
- Genre: Rock
- Length: 50:02
- Label: A West Side Fabrication

The Bear Quartet chronology
Penny Century (1992)	Cosy Den (1993)

Penny Century is the debut album of Swedish indie rock group the Bear Quartet. It was released in 1992 on the record label A West Side Fabrication.

== Track listing ==
1. "The Juiceman"
2. "Headacher"
3. "20"
4. "Hrnn Hrnn"
5. "Spoon"
6. "Bob"
7. "Private Sue"
8. "Dead Speedy"
9. "Tenderversion"
10. "Elvis Beach"
11. "I Got the Door"
12. "Sandi Morning"
13. "Broke"

== Sources ==
- Penny Century – The Bear Quartet Fan Pages
