= The (International) Noise Conspiracy =

Swedish rock band

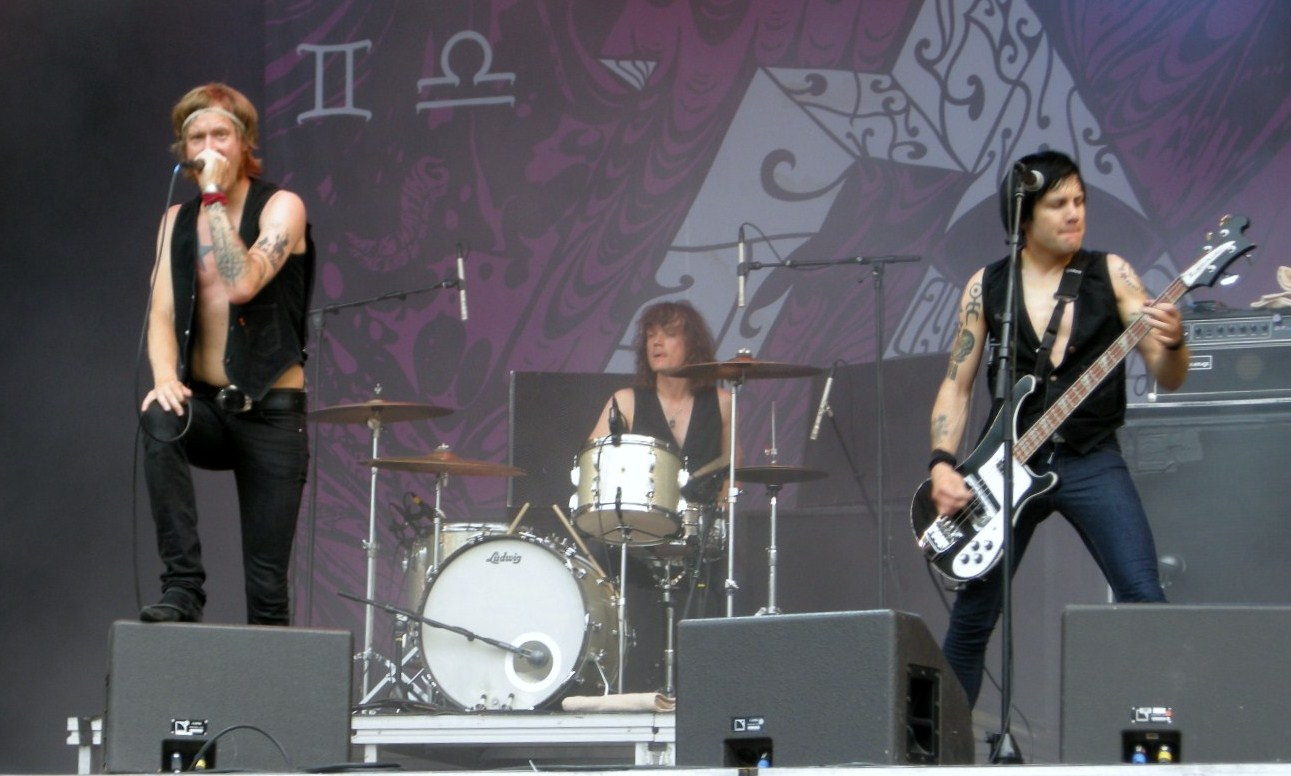
- The (International) Noise Conspiracy in 2009

Background information
- Origin: Umeå, Sweden
- Genres: Garage rock; garage punk; post-punk revival; indie rock; power pop
- Years active: 1998–2009
- Labels: G7 Welcoming Committee; Burning Heart; Your Choice; American Recordings
- Spinoffs: INVSN, Masshysteri, Vännäs Kasino
- Spinoff of: Refused, Doughnuts, Saidiwas
- Past members: Dennis Lyxzén; Inge Johansson; Lars Strömberg; Ludwig Dahlberg; Sara Almgren

The (International) Noise Conspiracy (abbreviated T(I)NC) was a Swedish rock band formed in late 1998. The lineup consisted of Dennis Lyxzén (vocals), Inge Johansson (bass), Lars Strömberg (guitar), and Ludwig Dahlberg (drums). The band was known for its punk and garage rock influences, along with its passionate left-wing political stance. Until 2004, guitarist/organist/keyboardist Sara Almgren was also part of the group. Dennis Lyxzén formed The (I)NC shortly after the breakup of his previous band, Refused. The (I)NC drew on the musical roots of at least four other bands, including Totalt Jävla Mörker (Johansson), Separation (Strömberg), Saidiwas (Dahlberg and Almgren), and Doughnuts (Almgren). In 2007, Inge Johansson also played with the band The Most.

Influenced by a quote from 1960s folk singer Phil Ochs, lead singer Lyxzén stated that the band aimed to blend music and politics into "a cross between Elvis Presley and Che Guevara." Additionally, according to the liner notes of their debut album, The First Conspiracy, the band sought to challenge music's role as a Spectacle—a concept derived from Guy Debord's work, The Society of the Spectacle.

== History ==
=== First recordings ===
In 1999, the band recorded their debut album, The First Conspiracy, with G7 Welcoming Committee Records. While not a commercial success, the album gained the band recognition from the punk label Burning Heart Records, which had previously released records by some of the members' earlier bands. In 2000, they released Survival Sickness. Widely regarded as one of the finest examples of situationist-influenced punk rock, Survival Sickness showcased the band's revolutionary ideology with biting lyrics and infectious rhythms. Many of the lyrics were drawn directly from the writings of the Situationist International, particularly Raoul Vaneigem's The Revolution of Everyday Life.

By 2001, the band returned to Burning Heart's studio to record their next album, A New Morning, Changing Weather. With the addition of Almgren's organ playing, The (International) Noise Conspiracy created a sound that extended beyond the boundaries of typical punk music. Incorporating organs, horns, and keys, the band began to develop a reputation for eclectic instrumentation, a characteristic they would continue to refine.

=== Touring ===
On tour in Heidelberg, Germany

The band's first tour outside their homeland of Sweden took them to China, where they performed in illegal and hidden rock clubs while Chinese police reportedly waited outside armed with guns and nightsticks. They also toured the United States with My Chemical Romance. The band's lead singer described their music as similar to The Hives but with a political edge, as The (International) Noise Conspiracy incorporates a strong Situationist agenda into some of their work, exemplified by songs like "Capitalism Stole My Virginity."

=== Later recordings ===
Between 2002 and 2003, the Up for Sale EP (Sympathy for the Record Industry) and Bigger Cages, Longer Chains EP (2003, Burning Heart/Epitaph Records) were recorded. The band's 16 March 2002 performance in Bremen, Germany was recorded and released by Tobby Holzinger (Your Choice Records) as Your Choice Live Series Vol. 25.

In 2004, The (International) Noise Conspiracy collaborated with producer Rick Rubin for their next album. Swedish jazz saxophonist Jonas Kullhammar temporarily joined the band on saxophone and keyboards, co-writing some of the songs. Organists Billy Preston and Benmont Tench also joined the lineup temporarily, as Sara Almgren left to join the Swedish punk band The Vicious (later Masshysteri). Rick Rubin signed the band to his label, American Recordings. The result was the release of Armed Love in 2004. The album's inlay paid tribute to the slogan "¡O Bailan todos, o no baila nadie!" written by the Tupamaros, which translates to "Either Everyone Dances, or No One Dances!" According to the band, this phrase reflects their philosophy and music.

In 2006, The (International) Noise Conspiracy contributed a cover of "Shut Up" to The Monks tribute album Silver Monk Time: A Tribute to The Monks, which was released in October.

By 2007, the band had completed recording a new album. In an interview for Rockstar.tv on 28 August, they announced plans to name the album The Cross of My Calling, stating it would feature "mystical" lyrics and a more soulful sound. The album was released on 17 November 2008 in Europe and 25 November in America. The fourteen-track album was produced by Rick Rubin and released through Burning Heart, American, and Vagrant Records.

== Members ==
- Sara Almgren – rhythm guitar, keyboards, organ (1998–2004)
- Ludwig Dahlberg – drums, percussion (1998–2009)
- Inge Johansson – bass, backing vocals (1998–2009)
- Dennis Lyxzén – lead vocals, tambourine, harmonica (1998–2009)
- Lars Strömberg – guitars, backing vocals (1998–2009)

== Discography ==
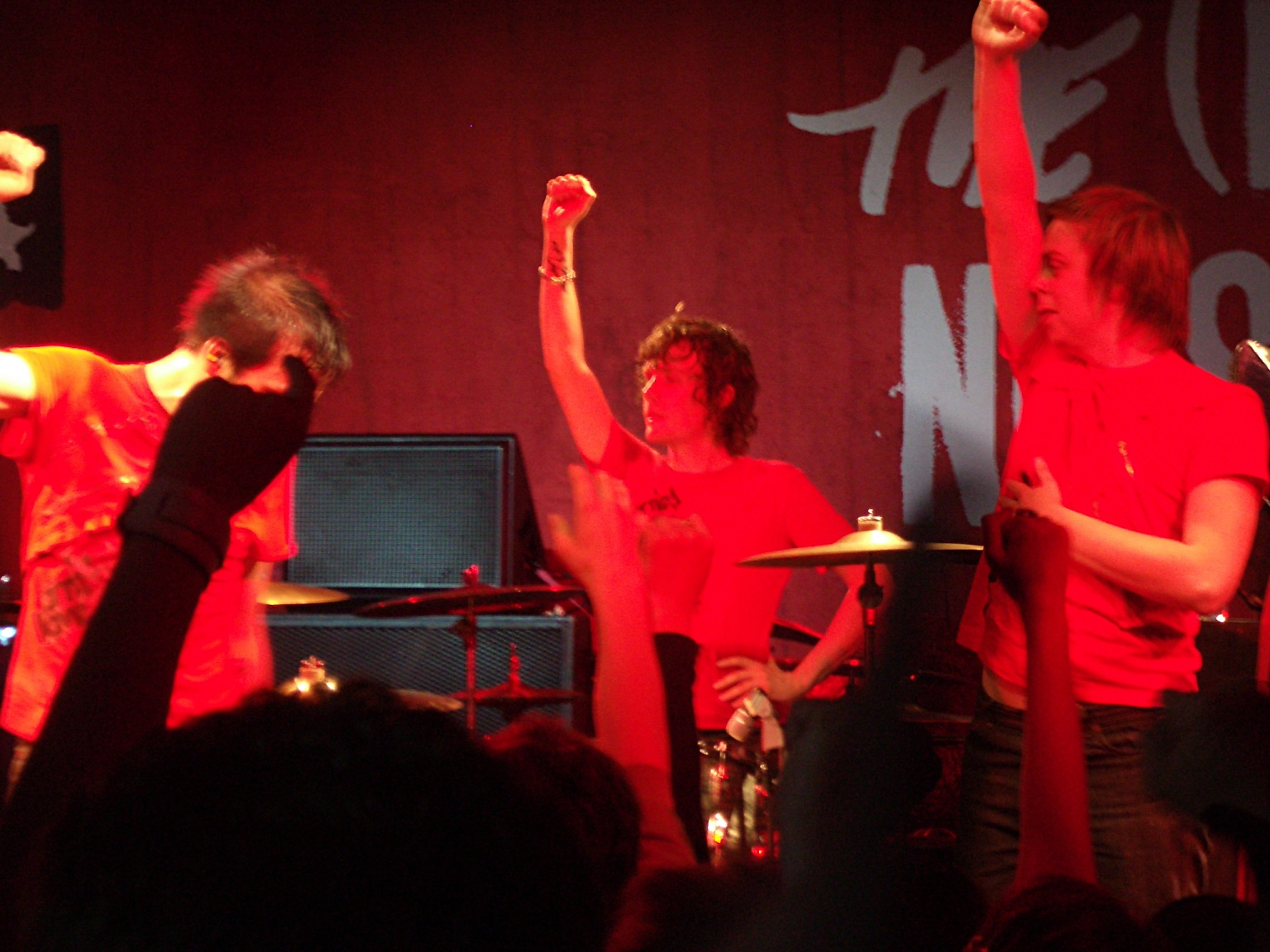
t(i)nc in Vancouver, 2005

=== Studio albums ===
- The First Conspiracy (1999, G7 Welcoming Committee Records)
- Survival Sickness (2000, Burning Heart/Epitaph)
- A New Morning, Changing Weather (2001, Burning Heart/Epitaph)
- Armed Love (2004, Burning Heart/American Recordings)
- The Cross of My Calling (2008, Burning Heart/Vagrant/American Recordings)

=== Live albums ===
- Your Choice Live Series 025 (2002, Your Choice Records)
- Live at Oslo Jazz Festival (2003, Moserobie Music Production)
- (Live EP) (2005, American Recordings)

=== EPs and singles ===
- The First Conspiracy 7" (1999, Premonition Records)
- Abolish Work 7" (1999, The Black Mask Collective)
- T.I.M.E.B.O.M.B. 7" (1999, Carcrash Records)
- The Subversive Sound of the Conspiracy 7" (1999, Trans Solar Records)
- Smash It Up EP (2000, Big Wheel Recreation)
- The Reproduction of Death EP (2001, Sub Pop Records)
- Capitalism Stole My Virginity EP (2001, G7 Welcoming Committee Records)
- Up For Sale EP (2002, Sympathy for the Record Industry)
- Bigger Cages, Longer Chains EP (2003, Burning Heart Records/Epitaph Records)
- Black Mask EP (2004, Burning Heart Records) (#92 UK)
- A Small Demand EP (2004, Burning Heart Records)

=== Compilations and other appearances ===
- The First Conspiracy (1999, G7 Welcoming Committee)
- Separation / T(I)NC (1999 split with Separation, The Black Mask Collective, Busted Heads Records)
- Take Penacilin Now (2005 compilation, G7 Welcoming Committee Records)
- Rock Against Bush Vol. 2 (2004 compilation, Fat Wreck Chords)
- Silver Monk Time: A Tribute to the Monks (2006 compilation, Play Loud!)
- Punk-o-Rama (vol. 7) (2001)

== Videography ==
- "Smash It Up"
- "The Reproduction of Death"
- "Capitalism Stole My Virginity"
- "Up For Sale"
- "Black Mask"
- "A Small Demand"

== See also ==
- Invasionen, Dennis Lyxzén's solo project
- Refused, Dennis Lyxzén's former band
