= The Sick-Leaves =

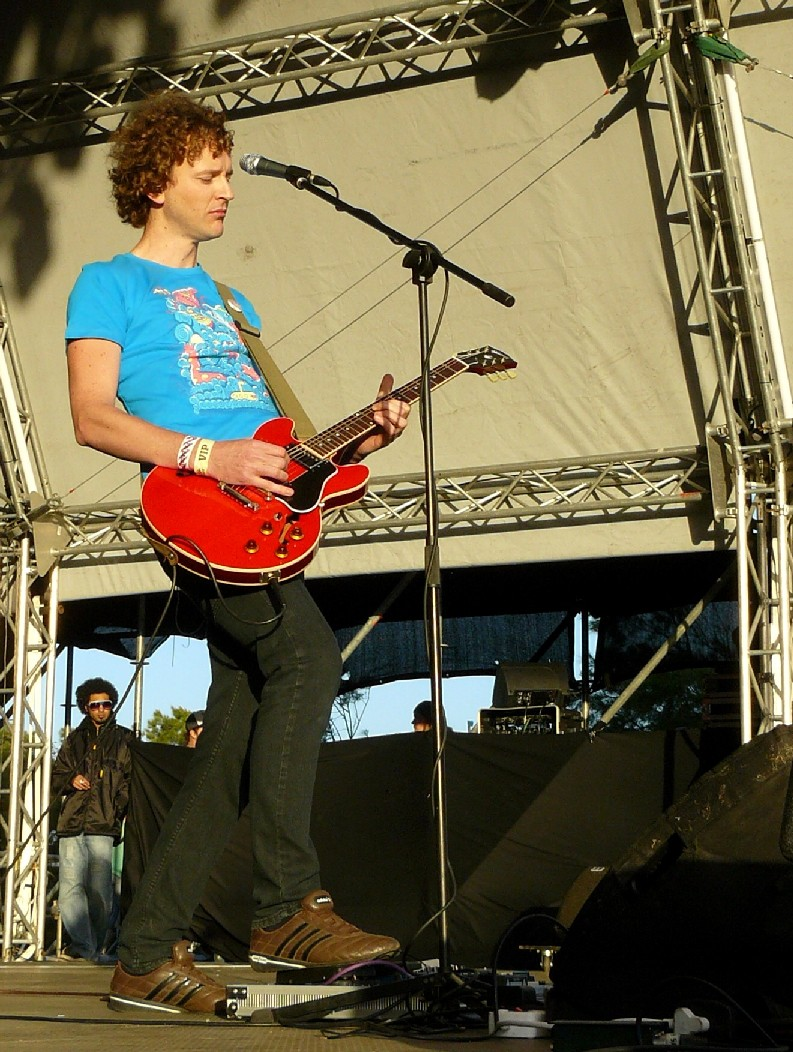
- The Sick-Leaves performing live at Rocking the Daisies festival, Darling, Western Cape, South Africa. 9 October 2009.

Background information
- Born: Eksteen Jacobsz; 15 January 1979 (age 47); Ermelo, Mpumalanga, South Africa
- Genres: Rock, Alternative rock, indie rock
- Occupations: Singer-Songwriter, Guitarist
- Instruments: Vocals, Guitar, Bass
- Years active: 2004–present
- Label: Independent
- Website: Myspace.com/thesickleaves

The Sick-Leaves is the solo project of Eksteen Jacobsz, an alternative rock artist from South Africa. Jacobsz is the songwriter, guitarist, vocalist and bassist for the act.

== Early life ==
Jacobsz grew up in Ermelo, Mpumalanga, South Africa. He started taking piano lessons when he was 11, but stopped after a year. He started playing guitar at boarding school aged 17, initially taught by his roommate, who had a guitar. Today Jacobsz plays guitar right-handed although he is left-handed.

In 2002, after receiving a degree in Investment Management, Jacobsz moved to London. He came into contact with his fellow band members through music ads on Denmark Street, forming a band called The Infidels. The band toured around London for two years with Jacobsz as the vocalist, before his visa ran out and he decided to return to South Africa and start his own project with more control over the songwriting. Jacobsz formed The Sick-Leaves in 2005 after his return from the UK.

== Career ==
Jacobsz's debut album, Tunnel Vision, was recorded in 2005, produced by South African producer Matthew Fink, and released by Sheer Music. In 2007 the album was nominated for a South African Music Award for Best Alternative Album of 2007.

Two singles from Tunnel Vision were play-listed on 5FM: "All these foolish things (I’ve said)" and "Such a Waster", which reached no.11 on the 5FM Top 40. Four singles were submitted to campus radio and all four reached the South African Top 10 chart on Tuks FM and the UJFM Top 20. "All These Foolish Things (I've said)" and "Such a Waster" reached no.1 on the TUKS FM South African Top 10. Tunnel Vision was also nominated for Best Album by the South African skate boarding magazine Blunt at their 2006 Awards.

In June 2008, Jacobsz released his second album Stone the Crow independently, utilising high pitched vocals and layered instrument approach. Singles taken from the album reached top 10 positions in the campus charts, with some making it to no.1. A music video was produced for "The Black Disciples".

In September 2008, The Sick-Leaves recorded a cover of "Missing" by Everything but the Girl, accompanied by a black and white music video, the band's first, which was released in December 2008, and put on rotation on MK, MTV BASE, SABC 1 & 2. The single reached no.1 on regional radio stations Highveld, and KFM's local top ten chart, 'The Homebrew top ten' which is voted by listeners.

In November 2009, The Sick-Leaves commenced recording of the third album, The Last Dance of The Sugar Plum Fairy, at SABC RDF M5 with producer Darryl Torr. Last Dance of The Sugar Plum Fairy consists of eleven original songs, with all instrumentation except for drums tracked by Jacobsz. Drums were performed by Wayne Kennith Pictor. The album was released on 8 March 2010.

The Sick-Leaves performed on 5FM's hour-long live performance show (Live)5 on 30 January, and held a media launch of the album in association with Jose Cuervo on Wednesday 24 November at a venue called Narina Trogon in Johannesburg, which included interviews for MK, youth TV channel Vuzu, and ETV's Showbiz Report amongst other radio and print media.

In January 2011, The Sick-Leaves commenced recording of the fourth album, Breaking Away, at SABC RDF M5 with producer Darryl Torr. Breaking Away consists of eight original songs with all instrumentation except for drums again tracked by Jacobsz. Pictor again provided the drum track. Overdubbing of guitars were tracked with Matthew Fink, who also acted as producer. The album was released on 23 January 2012. Muse Online magazine described the album as the band's "best to date".

The Sick-Leaves commenced writing and recording for the fifth album, Travels with Charlie, in March 2013. The album consists of 11 original songs with all instrumentation except for drums tracked by Jacobsz, who also produced the album himself for the first time, and Pictor returning as drummer. The album was recorded in various bedrooms, basements and sheds. The drums were recorded at Openroom Studios, Johannesburg. The album was mixed in Chicago, United States by Matt Dougherty and mastered in Johannesburg by Rogan Kelsey. The album was released on 27 June 2017. Skyways Magazine said that the album "requires repeated listens", and the Captain, my Captain music blog named the album as Jacobsz's best.

== Style ==
According to bizcommunity.com, "Jacobsz has a distinctive guitar style which is heard on all four released albums with The Sick-Leaves sound being described as classic guitar driven rock & roll with high pitched vocals and strong bass lines"

== Awards and recognition ==
Both Tunnel Vision and Stone The Crow were nominated for SA Music Awards in the category of "Best Alternative Album: English", in the years 2007 and 2009 respectively. The music video for "All These Foolish Things (I've said)" was nominated in 2010 for a MK Award in the category of Best Animated Music video SFX.

Blunt magazine nominated The Sick-Leaves for a Blunt Award for Best Rock Album in 2007.

== Discography ==
- Tunnel Vision (2006)
  - track listing:
  1. Coffee Break
  2. Kiss and Tell
  3. Tunnel Vision
  4. All these foolish things (I’ve said)
  5. Across the line
  6. Short Skirts
  7. Such a Waster
  8. The Usual Favours
  9. To Below and Above
  10. Tell you all
  11. Par Avion
  12. Overkill
  13. Do
  14. Articles from the Archives
- Stone the Crow (2008)
  - track listing:
  1. I'll Follow You
  2. Valley of the Dolls
  3. Kaizen
  4. Phantom Pain
  5. Foggy
  6. The Familiar Departed
  7. The Black Disciples
  8. Coppice Fire
  9. Lock 'n Load
  10. Scotoma (Seein' Ain’t Believin')
  11. Hustle Honey
  12. Uncovered
  13. Torpedoed Lifeboat
- Last Dance of the Sugar Plum Fairy (2010)
  - track listing
  1. All you want
  2. What are you waiting for?
  3. Coz you like it
  4. Run away
  5. Move faster than this
  6. Heartland
  7. K2
  8. Tell it like it is
  9. The Geisha Puppets
  10. Come & Go
  11. From where you came
- Breaking Away (2012)
  - track listing
  1. The Other Way
  2. I Know Your Name
  3. Fanning The Flames
  4. Breaking Away
  5. Catfights in Bushes
  6. No Doubt About It
  7. Not Unlike You
  8. They Died With Their Boots On
- Travels with Charlie (2017)
  - track listing
  1. Shoot the messenger
  2. Six inch valley (a.k.a. Cancer)
  3. (I've got) All the time in the world
  4. Underneath it all
  5. Sins of the city
  6. Adrift
  7. A silver lining
  8. She ain't here
  9. Jacqualine
  10. What a life
  11. I'll wait for you

=== Covers ===
- "Missing" by Everything But The Girl (released September 2008)
- "Crying" by Roy Orbison (released April 2011)
