= Galen Crew =

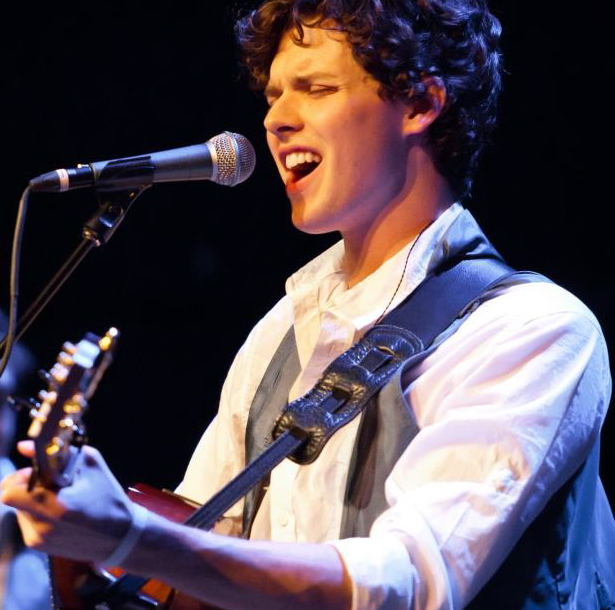

Background information
- Born: July 11, 1990 (age 36)
- Genres: Pop; folk; singer-songwriter
- Occupations: Artist; music producer; singer-songwriter
- Instruments: Acoustic guitar; electric guitar; ukulele; piano; bass guitar
- Years active: 2009–present
- Website: galencrew.com

Galen Michael Crew (born July 11, 1990) is an American singer-songwriter, musician, and music producer. In 2015, his songs went viral throughout China and they since have been streamed hundreds of millions of times on Chinese music platforms including NetEase and Xiami. In response to his following in China, Crew has often toured the country beginning in 2016 including a January 2024 trip. His music video for the single "Fragrance" was filmed in Shanghai, China and has footage from concerts in other cities in the country. The single "Princess" from his solo album Better than a Fairy Tale has been featured on ABC's Good Morning America. In 2020, Crew made a guest appearance in the music video for the Newsboys single "Love One Another." He has written and toured with Phil Joel, Roger Cook, Kelsea Ballerini and other Nashville artists. Crew's latest, fourth studio LP, Troubadour, was released November 22, 2023.

== Early life ==
Crew was in a rock band while in high school, Seraph, which was composed of Crew on electric guitar, Josh Caste on lead vocals, Nicky Hackett on bass, and Jordan Thompson on drums. Crew was part of the rock-pop group Vinyl Relay while attending college. He became a solo artist in 2011 and began writing songs with Roger Cook at the same time.

== Touring ==
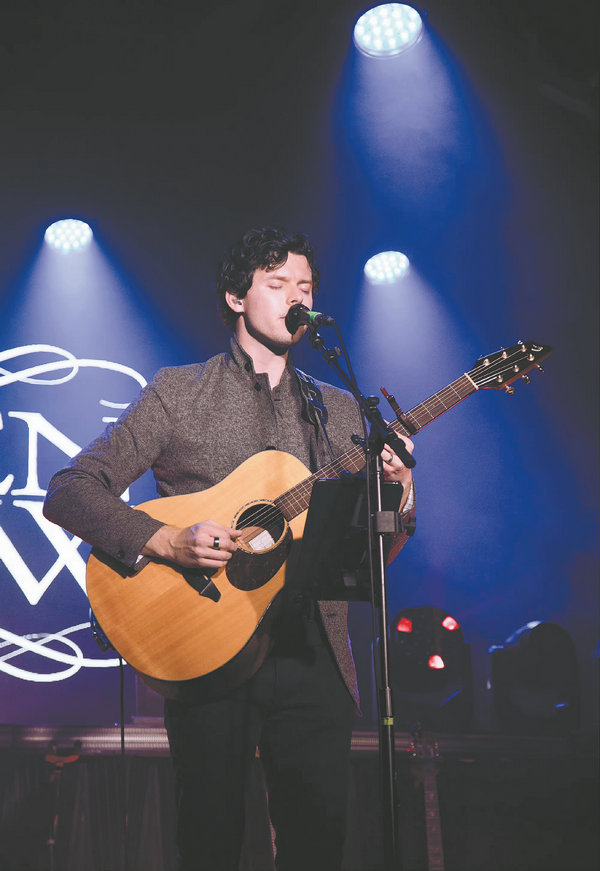
Galen Crew on tour in China, July 2024

In 2013, Crew toured with Cook in the United Kingdom. In 2014, he toured with Phil Joel in the U.S. As of 2024, Crew's songs have reached the hundreds of millions on Chinese sites like NetEase Cloud Music.

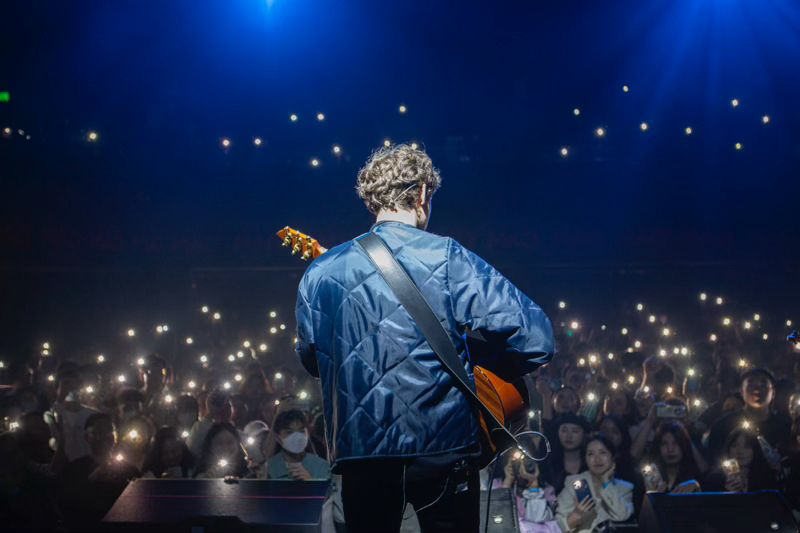
Crew on tour in Beijing, July 2024

Crew was sponsored by the Chinese company XiaoKang and toured China for the first time in May 2016. He since went to Shanghai, Guangzhou, Beijing, and Hong Kong. Crew returned to China for a second tour in the fall of 2016, touring 13 cities including Zibo. In 2019, performed in seven cities including Guangzhou, Hangzhou, Chongqing, and Chengdu. He toured China a fourth time in early 2024.

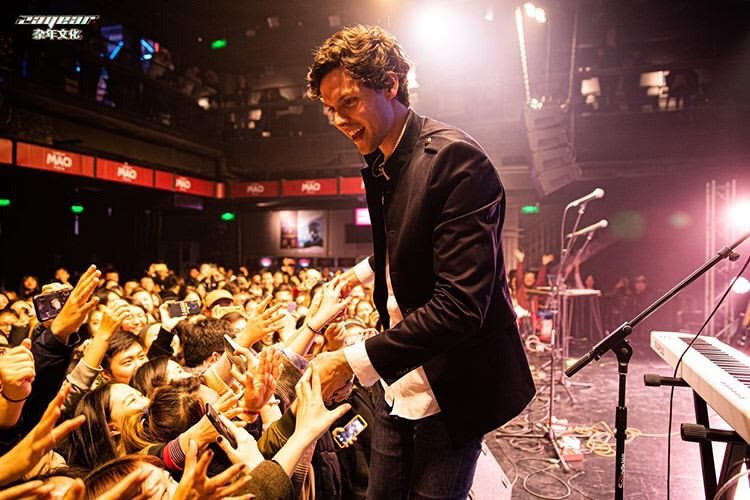
Crew greeting fans onstage in Beijing, 2019

== Music and influences ==
Most of Crew's catalogue is co-written with legendary British songwriter Roger Cook. Crew's music often features whimsical themes and otherworldly elements drawn from fairy tales and fantasy to form modern parables in the form of song. He draws inspiration from the troubadours of medieval Europe who were often both knights and poets. His style is said to be "a blend of pop and alternative with some electronic and folky elements." Crew's musical influences include "the Beatles, Coldplay and John Mayer," and songwriting inspiration is taken from mythical works in addition to J.R.R. Tolkien, C.S. Lewis, Hermann Hesse, and other fantasy authors. As a tribute to his success in China, Crew prominently featured the erhu, a traditional Chinese stringed instrument, in the single "Fragrance." The music video for the single contains shots of scenery in Shanghai and everyday life in China. In 2022, he released a song written in Mandarin Chinese entitled I Know Your Name.

== Discography ==
Crew has released several singles, eight EPs, and four LPs:

- Better Than a Fairy Tale (2012)
- Acoustic Daydreams (2012)
- Like Fire EP (2013)
- Christmas Spirit EP (2013)
- Let Them Sing (2014)
- Sleepyhead EP (2016)
- Apologue, Vol. 1 EP (2018)
- Apologue, Vol. 2 EP (2018)
- Apologue, Vol. 3 EP (2018)
- Apologue, Vol. 4 EP (2019)
- Tunnels, EP (2021)
