= Armed Love =

Studio album by the (International) Noise Conspiracy
- Released: July 12, 2004
- Genres: Garage rock, punk
- Length: 39:27
- Label: Burning Heart
- Producer: Rick Rubin

The (International) Noise Conspiracy chronology
A New Morning, Changing Weather (2001)	Armed Love (2004)	The Cross of My Calling (2008)

Professional ratings
Aggregate scores
Source	Rating
Metacritic	62/100
Review scores
Source	Rating
AllMusic	4/5 stars
Pitchfork	7/10

Armed Love is a studio album by the (International) Noise Conspiracy. Released on July 12, 2004, it is the first of two recording collaborations with producer Rick Rubin.

== Track listing ==
All tracks are written by the (International) Noise Conspiracy.

No.	Title	Length
1.	"A Small Demand"	3:45
2.	"The Way I Feel About You"	4:50
3.	"Let's Make History"	4:06
4.	"The Dream is Over"	3:27
5.	"All in All"	3:50
6.	"Black Mask"	3:35
7.	"Communist Moon"	3:44
8.	"This Side of Heaven"	3:13
9.	"Like a Landslide"	4:10
10.	"Armed Love"	4:49
