= Ny Våg =

Swedish record label

- Founded: 2005
- Founder: Dennis Lyxzén, Inge Johansson
- Distributors: Cargo Records, Sound Pollution
- Genre: Hardcore punk, Punk
- Country of origin: Sweden
- Official website: nyvag.com

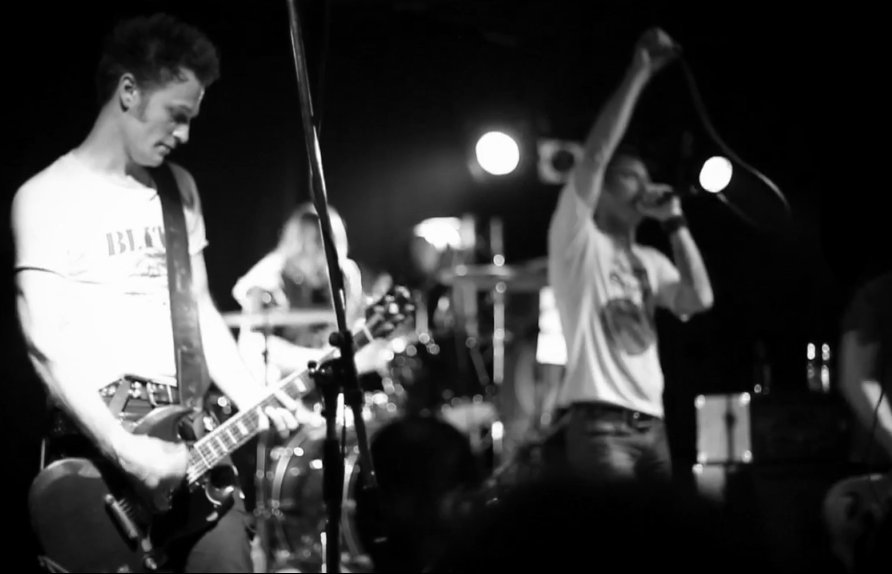
AC4

Ny Våg is an independent record label founded by Dennis Lyxzén and Inge Johansson in 2005. It focuses on releases by bands associated with the large punk and hardcore scene in Umeå, Sweden, where the label is based. The web site is currently up for sale.

== Label discography ==
- (Nyvåg #001) REGULATIONS - Regulations LP/CD
- (Nyvåg #002) KNUGEN FALLER - Inte som ni 7" (with Cage Match Federation)
- (Nyvåg #003) THE LOST PATROL BAND - The Lost Patrol Band LP
- (Nyvåg #004) RANDY - Randy The Band LP (with Cage Match Federation)
- (Nyvåg #005) THE VICIOUS - The Vicious 12" (with Cage Match Federation)
- (Nyvåg #006) REGULATIONS - Electric Guitar LP/CD (with Cage Match Federation)
- (Nyvåg #007) THE LOST PATROL BAND - Automatic Kids 7"
- (Nyvåg #008) THE VICIOUS - Alienated LP/CD (with Cage Match Federation)
- (Nyvåg #009) THE LOST PATROL BAND - Automatic LP/CD
- (Nyvåg #010) KNUGEN FALLER - Lugna Favoriter LP/CD (with Cage Match Federation)
- (Nyvåg #011) STEFAN & THE PROBLEMATIX 7" (with P.Trash Records)
- (Nyvåg #012) THE MOST - Face the Future 7"
- (Nyvåg #013) BOMBETTES - What's Cooking Good Looking 7"
- (Nyvåg #014) (INSURGENT KID - Bad DNA 7" remains unreleased)
- (Nyvåg #015) REGULATIONS - Different Needs 7" (with P.Trash Records)
- (Nyvåg #016) KOMMUNEN - Den Svenska Modellen 7" (with Twice The Speed Records, Wasted Sounds and Hardware Records)
- (Nyvåg #017) THE MOST - Moderation In Moderation 7"
- (Nyvåg #018) TRISTESS - Hög & Låg Blues LP/CD
- (Nyvåg #019) EPIDEMICS - Waking Up The Dead LP (with Thrashbastard Records)
- (Nyvåg #020) V/A - Umeå Vråljazz Giganter LP/CD
- (Nyvåg #121) MASSHYSTERI - Vår Del Av Stan LP/CD

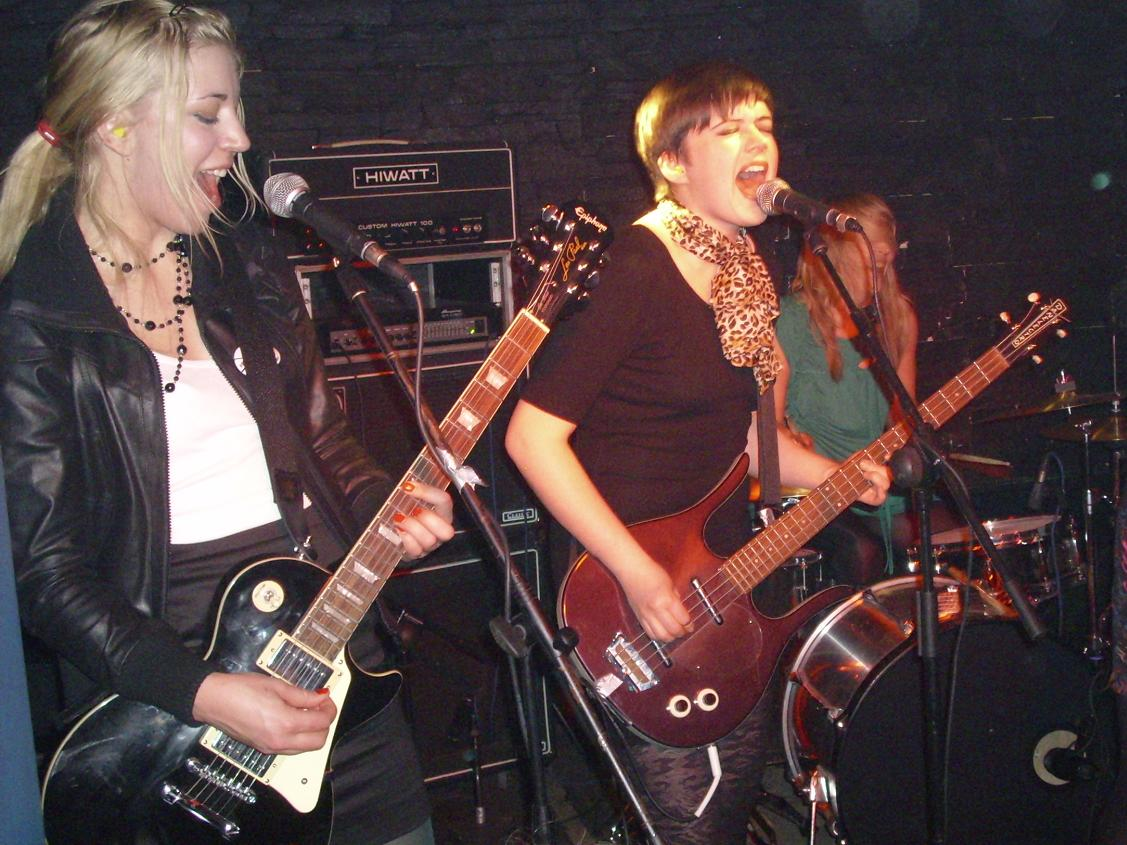
The Bombettes in 2009

- (Nyvåg #122) BOMBETTES - You Have No Chance, Lance! 7"
- (Nyvåg #123) AC4 - AC4 LP/CD
- (Nyvåg #124) MATTIAS ALKBERG - Nerverna LP
- (Nyvåg #125) REGULATIONS - To Be Me LP/CD (with P.Trash Records)
- (Nyvåg #126) INVASIONEN - Hela Världen Brinner LP
- (Nyvåg #127) MASSHYSTERI - Masshysteri LP/CD
- (Nyvåg #128) BOMBETTES - Get out of my trailer, Sailor! LP/CD
- (Nyvåg #129) INVASIONEN - Arvegods 12"
- (Nyvåg #130) UX VILEHEADS - Hardcore XI LP
- (Nyvåg #131) MATTIAS ALKBERG - Anarkist LP
- (Nyvåg #132) ALONZO & FAS 3 - Dansa Som En Fjäril 7"
- (Nyvåg #133) AC4 - Burn The World LP/CD (with Deathwish Inc.)
- (Nyvåg #134) FUKUSHIMA - Invisible Hand LP
- (Nyvåg #135) BAD NERVE - Bad Nerve 7"
- (Nyvåg #136) HOLY - Stabs LP (with PNKLSM)
