= Groezrock =

Annual music festival in Belgium

Coordinates: 51.109773°N 5.104576°E

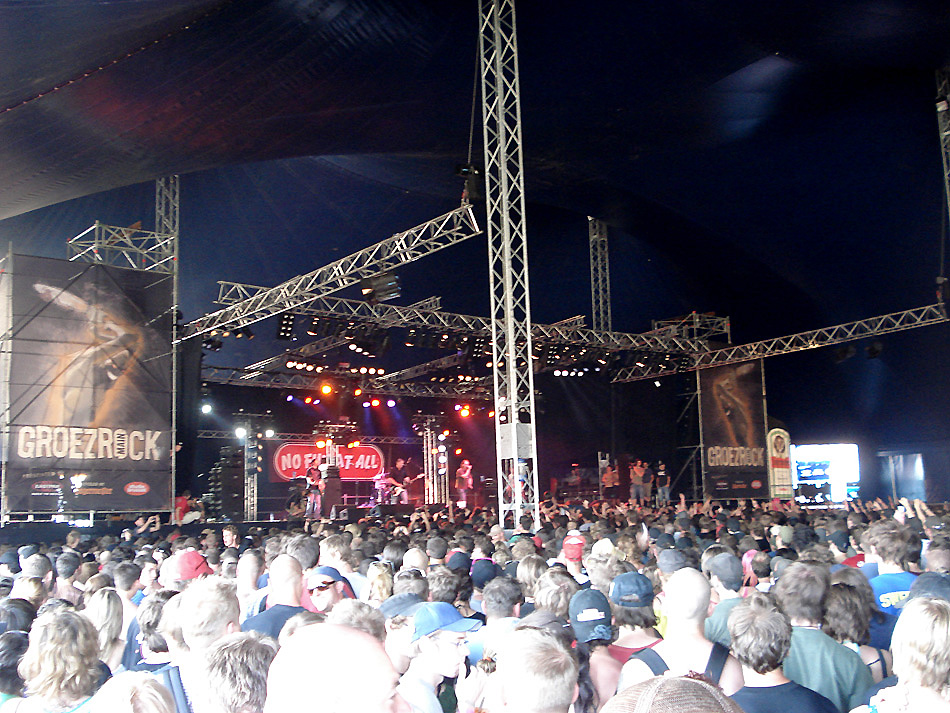
- Genre: Punk rock, hardcore punk, alternative rock, metalcore
- Locations: Meerhout, Belgium
- Years active: 25 April 1992 – present
- Website: groezrock.be

Groezrock is an annual music festival that took place in Meerhout, Belgium. It started as a small rock and pop festival with one stage and a few hundred people attending, but evolved into a large punk rock/hardcore punk festival, with attendances exceeding 30,000.

The festival had one stage until 2003, when it added a second stage called Back-to-Basics, which was reserved for more hardcore-oriented bands. Since 2006 the festival has taken place over multiple days, and grew to three stages in 2009 and four stages in 2012.

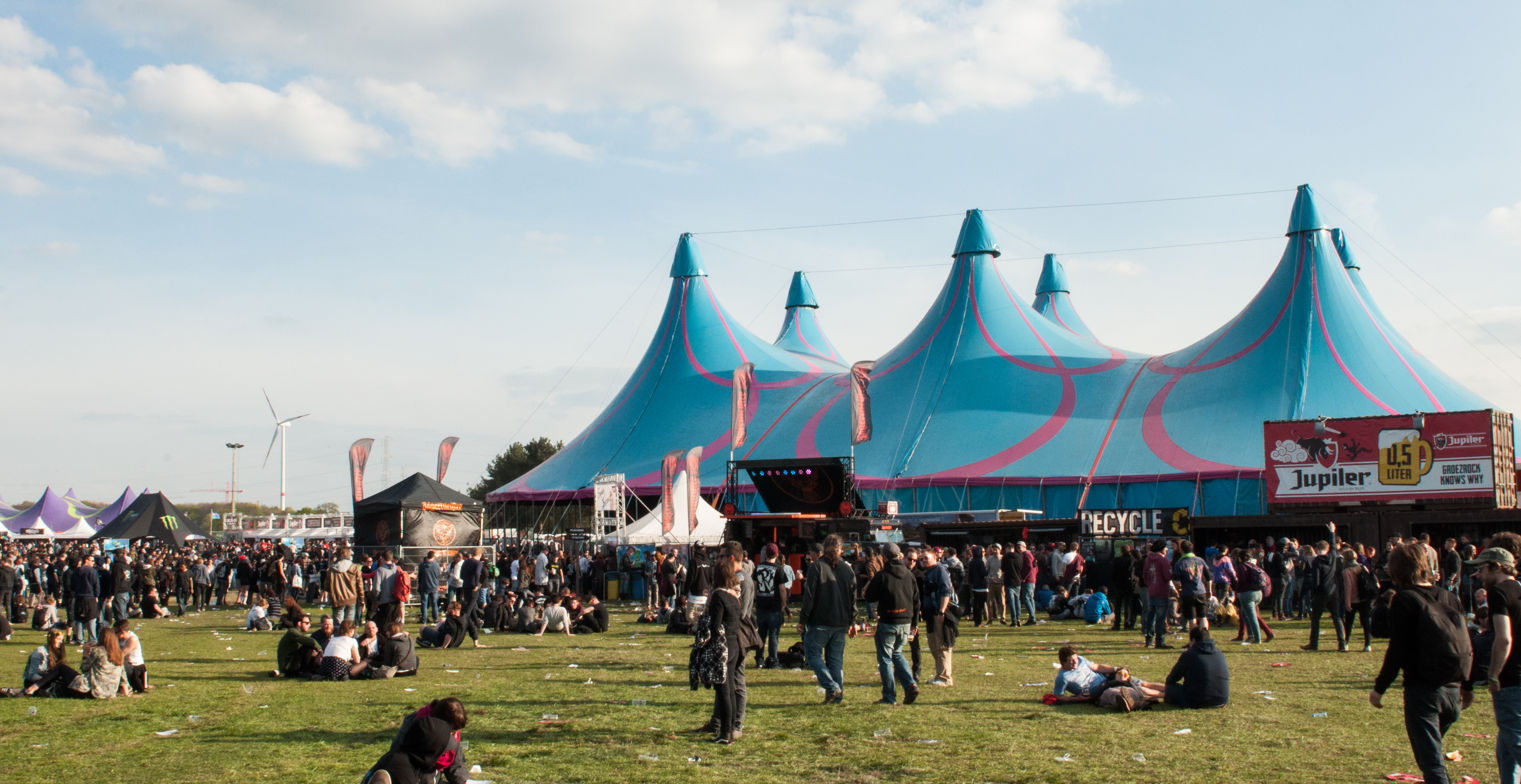
Groezrock festival in 2015

It was announced in October 2017 that the 2018 edition of Groezrock would not be taking place in the Spring, and would instead be an indoor festival in the autumn. The festival have stated that they will be "back in full force" with the usual format in 2019.

== 1992 ==
1992: Grandma's Toy, Buckle Juice, Dinky Toys, Pitti Polak

== 1993 ==
1993: Give Buzze, The Establishment, Ashbury Faith, The Scabs

== 1994 ==
1994: One Hes, Inna Nip, Rusk, Groggy's Crawl, Thermos, Burma Shave, Metal Molly, Jack of Hearts, Soapstone, B.J. Scott

== 1995 ==
1995: Oxid, Cesspool, Quip, Dildo Warheads, Mutilated, Deeper, Brotherhood Foundation, L.A. Doors

== 1996 ==
1996: Small Yellow Fish, Protest, Underdog!?, Cooper, Def Real, The Romans, Brotherhood Foundation, Deviate

== 1997 ==
1997 (26 April): Ryker's, Heideroosjes, Brotherhood Foundation, Gwyllions, Instructions For Use, Igor's Record Shop, Cornflames, Flee Bag

== 1998 ==
1998 (25 April): Millencolin, Good Riddance, |Intensity, AFI, Hard Resistance, Undeclinable Ambuscade, Pancake, Instructions For Use, Sixpack Joe, Cooperate, Plan 9

== 1999 ==
1999 (24 April): No Fun at All, Ten Foot Pole, 59 Times The Pain, Good Riddance, 88 Fingers Louie, Buck Wild, Bombshell Rocks, Void Section, Janez Detd., 2 Late, Access Denied, Nevergreen, PN

== 2000 ==
2000 (29 April): No Fun at All, Heideroosjes, Down By Law, Liberator, Bouncing Souls, Within Reach, Facedown, Vision, 5 Days Off, I Against I, Skin Of Tears, Apeshit, Delate, Figure It Out

== 2001 ==
2001 (28 April): Square One, Buckle Up, Powerhouse, Deviates, Venerea, Burning Heads, Adhesive, Stoned, Randy, Undeclinable, 59 Times the Pain, Snuff, SNFU, Ignite, Voodoo Glow Skulls

== 2002 ==
2002 (27 April): Bad Religion, Sick of It All, Guttermouth, Down By Law, Satanic Surfers, Rise Against, Undeclinable Ambuscade (surprise act), Circle, .Calibre, Kill Your Idols, Horace Pinker, Flatcat

== 2003 ==
2003 (26 April):

Main: Dropkick Murphys, Biohazard, Glassjaw, Ten Foot Pole, Hot Water Music, dredg, Flogging Molly, Gameface, Randy, The Shandon, Face Tomorrow, Skool's Out

B2B: Severance, Between The Lines, Support, Terror, Caliban, Give Up the Ghost, Stairland, Poison the Well

== 2004 ==
2004 (24 April):

Main: Millencolin, Sick of It All, Heideroosjes, Mad Caddies, Madball, Pulley, Strung Out, Ten Foot Pole, Midtown, The Almighty Trigger Happy, Travoltas, Belvedere, Beatsteaks

B2B: E.Town Concrete, Stretch Arm Strong, Liar, The Bronx, The Promise, Cornflames, Rise and Fall, Champion

== 2005 ==
2005 (Saturday 30 April)

Main Stage	Back To Basics Stage
Lagwagon; Hatebreed; Mad Caddies; Flogging Molly; 7 Seconds; Boysetsfire; Rise Against; Tsunami Bomb; Strike Anywhere; Only Crime; Capdown; Smoke or Fire; SFP	Coheed and Cambria; Ringworm; Hopesfall; Street Dogs; Alexisonfire; From Autumn to Ashes; Modern Life Is War; Maroon; The Setup; Malkovich

== 2006 ==
2006 (28 and 29 April)

=== Friday 28 April ===
Main Stage

Taking Back Sunday
Thrice
Goldfinger
Underoath
Silverstein
Aiden
Say Anything

=== Saturday 29 April ===
Main Stage	Back To Basics Stage
Bad Religion; Dropkick Murphys; Me First and the Gimme Gimmes; Sick of It All; Less Than Jake; No Use for a Name; Anti-Flag; Death by Stereo; The Lawrence Arms; Peter Pan Speedrock; A Wilhelm Scream; Latterman	Path of Resistance; All Out War; Born from Pain; Comeback Kid; Raised Fist; Himsa; Bold; The Maple Room; Officer Jones and HPCP; The Spirit That Guides Us; The Banner

== 2007 ==
( 27 and 28 April)

=== Friday 27 April ===
We Rock Stage (Main Stage)	EASTPAK Core Stage
New Found Glory; The All-American Rejects; Motion City Soundtrack; Big D and the Kids Table; Saosin; Enter Shikari	Death by Stereo; Caliban; No Turning Back; Stretch Arm Strong; Senses Fail; Gallows

=== Saturday 28 April ===
We Rock Stage (Main Stage)	EASTPAK Core Stage
Lostprophets; Jimmy Eat World; Lagwagon; Strung Out; Rise Against; Tiger Army; Mad Caddies; MxPx; The Ataris; Street Dogs; Hit the Lights; Death Before Disco	Hatebreed; Ignite; Terror; Converge; Sparta; Aiden; The Bronx; Deadline; Full Blown Chaos; Cancer Bats mewithoutYou

== 2008 ==
( 9 and 10 May)

=== Friday 9 May ===
Main Stage	EASTPAK Core Stage
Billy Talent; Anti-Flag; Alkaline Trio; Heaven Shall Burn; All Time Low; Mayday Parade; Set Your Goals	Hot Water Music; Finch; Silverstein; The Audition; Strike Anywhere; The Blackout

=== Saturday 10 May ===
Main Stage	EASTPAK Core Stage
Bad Religion; Thursday; Face to Face; The Planet Smashers; 59 Times the Pain; No Fun at All; The Toasters; A Wilhelm Scream; The Loved Ones; El Guapo Stuntteam; The Bones; The Flatliners	Story of the Year; Sick of It All; Agnostic Front; Parkway Drive; The Bouncing Souls; The Setup; HORSE The Band; Do Or Die; This Is Hell; Cursed; Suicide Silence; Bury Your Dead

== 2009 ==
( 17 and 18 April)

=== Friday 17 April ===
Main Stage	EASTPAK Core Stage	ETNIES Back To Basics Stage
Bullet For My Valentine; Taking Back Sunday; Underoath; MxPx; Catch 22; You Me At Six; Kid Down	Thursday; Bring Me the Horizon; Poison The Well; Senses Fail; United Nations; Escape the Fate	Amenra; P.O.Box; VersaEmerge; Innerpartysystem; Sounds Like Violence; Campus

=== Saturday 18 April ===
Main Stage	EASTPAK Core Stage	ETNIES Back To Basics Stage
NOFX; Rise Against; The Get Up Kids; No Fun at All; The Living End; The Vandals; The Academy Is... The Aquabats; Street Dogs; The Unseen; The Flatliners; Gino's Eyeball	Walls Of Jericho; Bleeding Through; Comeback Kid; Mad Sin; Darkest Hour; First Blood; The Ghost Of A Thousand; Architects; Emery; Misery Signals; Bane; Outbreak	Backfire! Nations Afire; Death Before Dishonor; The Sedan Vault; Billy The Kill; Mid Air Collision; True Colors; This Is a Standoff; Beneath the Massacre; Tenement Kids; Nuns Go Riot; Tackleberry

== 2010 ==
( 23 and 24 April):

=== Friday 23 April ===
Main Stage	EASTPAK Core Stage	ETNIES Back To Basics Stage
The Mighty Mighty Bosstones; Face To Face; Glassjaw; Millencolin; Caliban; The Real McKenzies; The Swellers	Funeral For A Friend; Agnostic Front; Alesana; Haste the Day; A Skylit Drive; Holding Onto Hope	The Friday Night Boys; Banner Pilot; Adept; This Is Hell; Young Guns; Grey Like Masquerade

=== Saturday 24 April ===
Main Stage	EASTPAK Core Stage	ETNIES Back To Basics Stage
Bad Religion; Pennywise; AFI; Sum 41; Lit; The Bouncing Souls; 88 Fingers Louie; Strike Anywhere; Zebrahead; MC Lars; Pour Habit; Mute	Story Of The Year; Parkway Drive; The Bronx; Mustard Plug; The Aggrolites; Despised Icon; A Wilhelm Scream; Dance Gavin Dance; The Ghost of a Thousand; Winds of Plague; The Warriors; 50 Lions	H_{2}O; Good Clean Fun; Born from Pain; Rise and Fall; Stick to Your Guns; Steak Number Eight; Mariachi El Bronx; Defeater; Static Radio; In Fear and Faith; Asking Alexandria

== 2011 ==
22 and 23 April

=== Friday 22 April ===
Main Stage	EASTPAK Core Stage	ETNIES Back To Basics Stage
Flogging Molly; Hatebreed; Further Seems Forever; Millencolin; Danko Jones; Sick of It All; The Black Pacific; Cute Is What We Aim For; Rufio; Craig's Brother; Army of Freshmen	Underoath; August Burns Red; Every Time I Die; Circa Survive; Thursday; The Blackout; Whitechapel; Twin Atlantic; We Came As Romans; Bleed from Within	Morning Again; Devils Brigade; Shai Hulud; Cancer Bats; No Friends; Grey Area; Veara; Blade; The Acacia Strain; Miss May I Impending Doom

=== Saturday 23 April ===
Main Stage	EASTPAK Core Stage	ETNIES Back To Basics Stage
NOFX; Dropkick Murphys; Descendents; Boy Sets Fire; Dashboard Confessional; Thursday; Goldfinger; Sugarcult; Piebald; Streetlight Manifesto; Teenage Bottlerocket; Dead to Me	The Used; Saves the Day; Blood for Blood; Madball; Snapcase; Comeback Kid; Street Dogs; Homer; Asking Alexandria; Old Man Markley; Blacklist Royals	H_{2}O; CIV; Brotherhood Foundation; No Trigger; The Ghost Inside; Of Mice & Men; Hoods; Dear Landlord; Grave Maker; Cruel Hand; Social Suicide

== 2012 ==
28 and 29 April

=== Saturday 28 April ===
Main Stage	Impericon Stage	ETNIES Back To Basics Stage	Acoustic Stage
Rancid; Lagwagon; Face To Face; Yellowcard; Heideroosjes; The Bouncing Souls; Reel Big Fish; Belvedere; None More Black; The Menzingers; Authority Zero; Chixdiggit	Parkway Drive; Heaven Shall Burn; The Dillinger Escape Plan; Evergreen Terrace; The Ghost Inside; Miss May I For Today; Royal Republic; We Are the In Crowd; The Copyrights; Paceshifters	Gallows; Hazen Street; Lifetime; Verse; Set Your Goals; The Wonder Years; Off With Their Heads; Hostage Calm; Confession; B.E.A.R; Counterpunch; Banquets	Garret Klahn; Face Tomorrow; Dustin Kensrue; Vienna; Yellowcard; The Bouncing Souls; Mikey Erg

=== Sunday 29 April ===
Main Stage	Impericon Stage	ETNIES Back To Basics Stage	Acoustic Stage
Refused; Simple Plan; Thrice; Good Riddance; Alkaline Trio; Hot Water Music; Motion City Soundtrack; MxPx; Zebrahead; Billy The Kill; Versus The World	Unearth; Terror; Anti-Flag; The Bronx; Architects; Your Demise; The Old Firm Casuals; The Dangerous Summer; Make Do and Mend; Wolves Like Us	Gorilla Biscuits; 7 Seconds; Slapshot; DYS; Such Gold; Cobra Skulls; Trigger Effect; Sunpower; Red City Radio; Junius	Chuck Ragan; Laura Jane Grace; Dave Hause; Mike Herrera; Jonah Matranga; Anti-Flag; Kevin Seconds

== 2013 ==
27 and 28 April

=== Saturday 27 April ===
Monster Stage (Main Stage)	Impericon Stage	ETNIES Stage	Acoustic Stage
Rise Against; Rocket From The Crypt; Pennywise; Hatebreed; Frank Turner and the Sleeping Souls; The Aquabats; Pulley; A Wilhelm Scream; Streetlight Manifesto; The Riverboat Gamblers; Far From Finished; The Rocket	Turbonegro; Texas Is The Reason...And You Will Know Us by the Trail of Dead; Grade; Emmure; The Kids; Samiam; Joey Cape's Bad Loud; Chelsea Grin; Crossfaith; Crushing Caspars	Comeback Kid; Kid Dynamite; Title Fight; Implants; Trapped Under Ice; The Story So Far; AC4; Obey The Brave; John Coffey; Six Ft Ditch; Attila; Buried In Verona	Dave Hause; Jonny Two Bags; Walter Schreifels; Scorpios; Kristopher Roe; Russ Rankin; Miracles; Minx

=== Sunday 28 April ===
Monster Stage (Main Stage)	Impericon Stage	ETNIES Stage	Acoustic Stage
Bad Religion; Billy Talent; The Used; The Starting Line; Less Than Jake; Strung Out; The Ataris; The Flatliners; Smoke or Fire; The Dopamines; Nothington	Killswitch Engage; Bring Me the Horizon; August Burns Red; Sparta; Attack Attack! Narrows; Adept; Stick to Your Guns; While She Sleeps; Bastions	Flag; Into Another; Strife; Polar Bear Club; First Blood; Old Man Markley; Pure Love; Iron Chic; Midnight Souls; Masked Intruder; The Front Bottoms	Geoff Rickly; Vinnie Caruana; Rocky Votolato; Tim Vantol; Rob Lynch; Into It. Over It. PJ Bond; Arizona & Grey Like Masquerade

== 2014 ==
2 and 3 May

=== Friday 2 May ===
Monster Stage (Main Stage)	Impericon Stage	ETNIES Stage	Macbeth Stage
NOFX; Brand New; Descendents; Alkaline Trio boysetsfire The Lawrence Arms; The Menzingers; Bodyjar; Gameface; Atlas Losing Grip; Astpai	Quicksand; Taking Back Sunday; Ignite; Madball; Terror; Saves The Day; The Wonder Years; Bayside; Wisdom in Chains; Devil in Me	H_{2}O; Paint It Black; La Dispute; Iron Chic; I Am The Avalanche; Deez Nuts; Red City Radio; PUP; Restorations	Everlast; Larry And His Flask; Tim Barry; INVSN; Chunk! No, Captain Chunk! Kids Insane; My Extraordinary; Fathoms; Still Bust; The Tramps

=== Saturday 3 May ===
Monster Stage (Main Stage)	Impericon Stage	ETNIES Stage	Macbeth Stage
The Offspring; The Hives; New Found Glory; Screeching Weasel; All; Snuff; Funeral Dress; The Casualties; The Smith Street Band; Elway; Get Dead	Falling In Reverse; Caliban; The Devil Wears Prada; The Ghost Inside; Norma Jean; Doomriders; I Killed The Prom Queen; Apologies, I Have None; Drug Church; The Charm The Fury	Judge; Modern Life Is War; Cro-Mags; Touché Amoré; Liferuiner; The Setup; Done Dying; Fabulous Disaster; The Priceduifkes	The Toasters; Crazy Arm; Bim Skala Bim; Bury Tomorrow; Blitz Kids; Edward In Venice; Shell Beach; River Jumpers; Moments; The Ignored

== 2015 ==
1 and 2 May

=== Friday 1 May ===
Monster Stage (Main Stage)	Impericon Stage	Back to Basics Stage	The Revenge Stage	Macbeth Stage
Social Distortion; Pennywise; Lagwagon; Broilers; Atreyu; Motion City Soundtrack; Against Me! The Dwarves; Masked Intruder; The Swellers; Joyce Manor	Unearth; The Ghost Inside; Suicide Silence; The Acacia Strain; Stick to Your Guns; While She Sleeps; Whitechapel; Carnifex; Set Things Right	Defeater; Trash Talk; Ceremony; Iron Reagan; Cancer Bats; Cold World; Set It Off; Toxic Shock; Brutus	Title Fight; Mineral; Knapsack; Transit; The Smith Street Band; Frnkiero and the Cellabration; The Hotelier; Gnarwolves; Beach Slang	Obey the Brave; Feed the Rhino; The Hell; Under the Influence; You May Kiss the Bride; Not on Tour; Black Sheep; Wolves Scream; Jarhead

=== Saturday 2 May ===
Monster Stage (Main Stage)	Impericon Stage	Back to Basics Stage	The Revenge Stage	Macbeth Stage
Refused; Millencolin; The Mighty Mighty Bosstones; Satanic Surfers; Good Riddance; The Loved Ones; Frenzal Rhomb; Teenage Bottlerocket; Off with Their Heads; The Real McKenzies; Love Zombies	Agnostic Front; Comeback Kid; Throwdown; Raised Fist; Psycho 44; Turbowolf; No Turning Back; Nasty; The Interrupters	American Nightmare; As Friends Rust; Off! Such Gold; Banner Pilot; Counterpunch; Turnstile; Your Highness; F.O.D.	Make Do and Mend; Basement; Bane; Obliterations; Reign Supreme; The Early November; Direct Hit! Timeshares; The Holy Mess	You Blew It! Forus; The Deaf; Call it Off; Ducking Punches; Tiger Bell; Kill the President; Bad Ideas; Shinebox

== 2016 ==
29 and 30 April

=== Friday 29 April ===
Monster Stage (Main Stage)	Impericon Stage	Back To Basics Stage	Watch Out Stage
Rancid; Hatebreed; Frank Turner & The Sleeping Souls; Less Than Jake; Four Year Strong; The Aggrolites	No Fun At All; Saosin; Walls Of Jericho; Despised Icon; Blessthefall; Hellions	Youth of Today; Terror; Siberian Meat Grinder; Muncie Girls; The Dirty Nil	Double Veterans; We'rewolves; Tangled Horns; Off The Cross; Coma Commander

=== Saturday 30 April ===
Monster Stage (Main Stage)	Impericon Stage	Back To Basics Stage	Watch Out Stage
Sum 41; No Use For A Name; Face To Face; Me First & The Gimme Gimmes; Mad Caddies; Juliette & The Licks; The Movielife; Flatcat; Venerea; Not On Tour	Sick of It All; Caliban; Emmure; Letlive; Bury Your Dead; Burn; Frank Carter & The Rattlesnakes; Northlane; Broken Teeth	Dag Nasty; Dillinger Four; Iron Chic; SNFU; The Falcon; Modern Baseball; Knockout Kid; Pears; Rozwell Kid	Moose Blood; PUP; Much the Same; Night Birds; Clowns; Bad Cop / Bad Cop; The Bennies; Teen Agers

== 2017 ==
29 and 30 April

=== Saturday 29 April ===
Monster Stage (Main Stage)	Back To Basics Stage	Watch Out Stage
Deftones; Thrice; Underoath; The Bouncing Souls; Strike Anywhere; The Menzingers; MewithoutYou; Swingin' Utters; The Flatliners; Red City Radio	Anti-Flag; Stick To Your Guns; Deafheaven; Cro-Mags; Brutality Will Prevail; Oathbreaker; Clowns; Skyharbor; Moments	In Hearts Wake; AJJ; Wolf Down; 99Plajo; He Is Legend; Tim Vantol; Petrol Girls; Trade Wind; Cocaine Piss toyGuitar

=== Sunday 30 April ===
Monster Stage (Main Stage)	Back To Basics Stage	Watch Out Stage
Parkway Drive; Pennywise; Cock Sparrer; Ignite; Choking Victim; Zebrahead; Belvedere; Skinny Lister; F.O.D.	Gorilla Biscuits; H_{2}O; Undeclinable Ambuscade; Counterfeit; No Turning Back; Brutus; Nothington; Arcane Roots	Blood Youth; Jeff Rosenstock; Incendiary; Boston Manor; Call It Off; Mobina Galore; Bent Life; Young Hearts
