= List of people from Glen Ellyn, Illinois =

== Arts and culture ==
Name	Image	Birth	Death	Known for	Association	Reference
Laurie Anderson		Jun 5, 1947		Performance artist and musician	Born in Glen Ellyn, graduated from Glenbard West	
Elek Bacsik		May 22, 1926	Feb 14, 1993	Hungarian-born American Gypsy jazz guitarist and violinist, also played on viola, violectra, violoncello, double bass and bouzouki	Lived and died in Glen Ellyn	
Jeffery Deaver		May 6, 1950		Best-selling mystery novelist (The Bone Collector, James Bond novel Carte Blanche)	Graduate of Glenbard West (1968)	
Katherine Dunham		Jun 22, 1909	May 21, 2006	Dancer	Grew up in Glen Ellyn	
Jacob Fuerst		Oct 27, 1992		Guitarist for Knockout Kid	Grew up in Glen Ellyn	
Jennifer Koh				Violinist	Born in Glen Ellyn	
Mark Daniel Rose				Front-man of rock band Spitalfield	From Glen Ellyn	
Larry Shue		Jul 23, 1946	Sep 23, 1985	Playwright (The Foreigner, The Nerd)		
Brian St. Clair		May 24, 1968		Drummer of rock band Local H	From Glen Ellyn	
Steven Suptic		Feb 5, 1993		Singer (SUGR?), YouTuber, actor (mlgHwnT, SourceFed, Sugar Pine 7), and Twitch streamer	From Glen Ellyn	
Molly Worthen		1981		Author and journalist	Raised in Glen Ellyn	

== Media ==
Name	Image	Birth	Death	Known for	Association	Reference
Amy Carlson		Jul 7, 1968		Actress (Another World, Third Watch, Blue Bloods)	Attended Glenbard West High School	
John Drury		Jan 4, 1927	Nov 25, 2007	Local 10:00 pm news anchor (WTMJ, WBBM, WGN, WLS)	Lived in Glen Ellyn	
Sean Hayes		Jun 26, 1970		Actor (Jack McFarland on Will & Grace)	Attended Glenbard West High School	
Michael Herbick				Sound engineer (The Fugitive, The Shawshank Redemption); Academy Award nominee, Emmy Award winner (Lonesome Dove)	Grew up in Glen Ellyn	
Ryan Kelley		Aug 31, 1986		Actor (Mean Creek, Prayers for Bobby, Ben 10: Alien Swarm)	Born in Glen Ellyn	
Frank Main		Sep 8, 1964		Journalist; Pulitzer Prize winner (2011)	Lived in Glen Ellyn	
Ryan McPartlin		Jul 3, 1975		Actor (Clutch Powers on Lego: The Adventures of Clutch Powers)	Raised in Glen Ellyn	
Greg Miller		Apr 27, 1983		Internet personality (IGN, The GameOverGreggy Show, Kinda Funny)	Born and raised in Glen Ellyn	
Patricia Tallman		Sep 4, 1957		Actress (Babylon 5, Army of Darkness, Night of the Living Dead, 1990)	Graduated Glenbard West High School (1975)	
Nancy Utley				Former co-chairman of Searchlight Pictures and former member of the Board of Governors of the Academy of Motion Picture Arts and Sciences	Grew up in Glen Ellyn; Graduate of Glenbard West High School (1973)	
Ted Wass		Oct 27, 1952		Actor and director (Blossom, Soap, Oh, God! You Devil)	Graduate of Glenbard West High School (1970)	

== Military ==
Name	Image	Birth	Death	Known for	Association	Reference
Marcellus Jones		Jun 5, 1830	Oct 9, 1900	Thought to have fired the first shot at the Battle of Gettysburg (1863)	Lived in Danby, Illinois (now called Glen Ellyn)	
David V. Miller		Jan, 2016	U.S. Air Force Major General	Born in Glen Ellyn, graduated from Glenbard High School		

== Politics and activism ==
Name	Image	Birth	Death	Known for	Association	Reference
Bill Ayers		Dec 26, 1944		Co-founder of the radical Weatherman organization (1969)	Born in Glen Ellyn	
Eboo Patel				Author and member of President Obama's Advisory Council on Faith-Based Neighborhood Partnerships	Born and raised in Glen Ellyn	
Peter Roskam		Sep 13, 1961		Former US congressman	Grew up in Glen Ellyn; graduated from Glenbard West High School (1979)	
Betty Wagner Spandikow		Sep 27, 1923	Oct 26, 2008	Author and breastfeeding advocate; co-founder of the La Leche League International		

== Sports ==
Name	Image	Birth	Death	Known for	Association	Reference
Matt Bowen		Nov 12, 1976		Strong safety for the Buffalo Bills, St. Louis Rams, Green Bay Packers, and Washington Redskins	Born and raised in Glen Ellyn	
Carolena Carstens		Jan 18, 1996		Martial artist (taekwondo); 2012 Summer Olympian	Lives in Glen Ellyn	
Ray Demmitt		Feb 2, 1884	Feb 19, 1956	Outfielder for the New York Highlanders, St. Louis Browns, Chicago White Sox and Detroit Tigers	Lived and died in Glen Ellyn	
Mike Hall		Feb 1, 1982		Winner of ESPN Dream Job; anchor with the Big Ten Network	Born in Glen Ellyn	
Bob MacLeod		Oct 15, 1917	Jan 13, 2002	Halfback for the Chicago Bears, inductee of the College Football Hall of Fame	Born in Glen Ellyn	
Alec Pierce		May 2, 2000		Wide receiver for the Indianapolis Colts (2022–present)	Born and raised in Glen Ellyn	
Tom Pukstys		May 28, 1968		Javelin thrower; silver medalist at the Goodwill Games (1998)	Born in Glen Ellyn	
Bobby Rahal		Jan 10, 1953		Indycar driver; winner of the Indianapolis 500	Graduate of Glenbard West (1971)	
John Shurna		Apr 30, 1990		All-American forward for the Northwestern Wildcats men's basketball team	Born in Glen Ellyn	
Revie Sorey		Sep 10, 1953		Guard for the Chicago Bears	Lived in Glen Ellyn	
Nikos Tselios		Jan 20, 1979		Defenseman for the Carolina Hurricanes, Chicago Hounds, KalPa (Finland) and Färjestad BK (Sweden)	Born and raised in Glen Ellyn	
Billy Williams		Jun 15, 1938		Hall of Fame left fielder for the Chicago Cubs and Oakland Athletics	Lived in Glen Ellyn	
