= F.O.D. (band) =

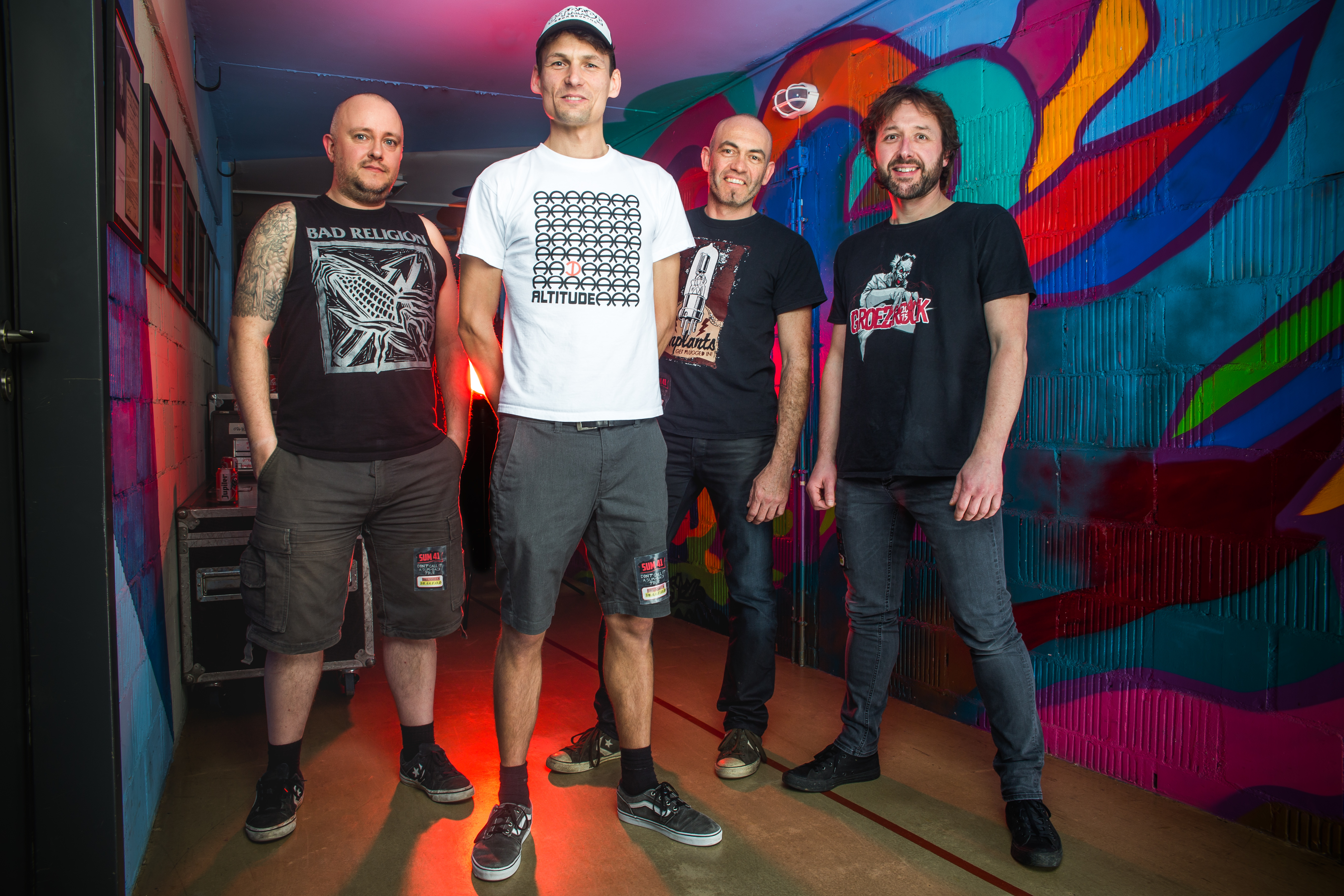
- F.O.D. in 2017

Background information
- Origin: Antwerp, Belgium
- Genres: Punk rock; pop-punk; skate punk
- Years active: 2008–present
- Labels: Effervescence Records, Bird Attack Radio Records, Bells On Records, Funtime Records, Thanks But No Thanks Records
- Members: Hans Roofthooft; Stijn de Waele; Pierre Janssens; Lode de Feyter
- Website: www.fodmusic.be

F.O.D. is a Belgian punk rock band known for its catchy melodies. A reviewer on Disagreement.net, an established music e-zine from Luxembourg, writes that while F.O.D. doesn't reinvent punk rock, the band "distinguishes itself from the competition because of the incredible vocal harmonies". Dutch independent record label Suburban Records refers to the band as a "household name in the Belgian punk rock scene", with a "great live reputation".

== Influences ==
The sound of F.O.D. is heavily influenced by the Fat Wreck Chords and Epitaph Records punk rock from the mid nineties (as portrayed in the documentary One Nine Nine Four), a musical genre sometimes referred to as skate punk. The Spanish alternative magazine Big Bombo describes F.O.D. as a band whose sound "reminds the listener of early Green Day" and "which is also clearly influenced by melodic punk rock bands like Lagwagon, Bad Religion and The Offspring".

== Publicity ==
F.O.D. was featured on the cover of RMP Magazine (Groezrock 2013 Edition, 2.000 copies printed, retail price €2,00). Belgian newspaper Het Nieuwsblad wrote an article about F.O.D., detailing how the band's debut album enabled their lifelong dream of playing shows in the province of Ontario (Canada) to come true.

F.O.D. has a bio on (and has been frequently mentioned on) the popular punk website Dying Scene. Punk website Bearded Punk did a 15-minute video feature about the band. Their albums have been reviewed by many magazines, webzines and online newspapers in various countries and multiple languages (Dutch, French, Spanish, and English). F.O.D. was featured in Episode 2 of a recent web TV series, called LARGE LIVE, by the popular mailorder and merchandising store Large Popmerchandising (the Dutch version of Hot Topic).

== Shows ==
F.O.D. has toured Canada (2013), Spain (2015), Japan (2017) an had various tours over countries in Europe.

F.O.D. has played main stages on numerous major festivals such as Groezrock (BE: 2013, 2015, 2017), Jera On Air (NL: 2017), Punk Rock Holiday (SLO: 2015, 2021), Brakrock (BE: 2014, 2015, 2017, 2021, 2022) ... as well as local festivals such as 'Lochtfest' or 'Razernij'.

F.O.D. has supported or shared the stage with many well known international punk rock bands: SUM 41, Lagwagon, No Fun At All, Satanic Surfers, Masked Intruder, Ten Foot Pole, Antillectual, Useless ID, The Decline (band), and many others.

== History ==
=== Origins ===
F.O.D. started in 2008 as a Green Day cover band. The Belgian music website Musiczine describes how the Antwerp based formation started out "with the goal of playing the album Dookie in its entirety". Their name is a reference to a song on the 1994 album Dookie, called F.O.D. (short for 'Fuck Off and Die...').

=== Dance To This (2011), Ontario (2013) ===
After 3 years of playing Green Day songs to various crowds in Belgium and Europe, F.O.D. started writing their own material. This resulted in the 2011 EP release Dance To This, followed by a 2013 album release Ontario. Both were released by record label Thanks But No Thanks Records. Belgian newspaper Gazet van Antwerpen reports that 1.000 copies of Ontario were pressed. Ontario was also available on 12" vinyl. This version included two bonus tracks: "Water Falls" and "Everything".

=== Tricks Of The Trade (2014) ===
On 23 September 2014, F.O.D. released their second album, called Tricks Of The Trade. It was released worldwide, on four different record labels: Thanks But No Thanks Records / Funtime Records (Belgium), Effervescence Records (Europe), Bird Attack Records (North America) and Bells On Records (Japan). To celebrate the release of the new album, F.O.D. fest was held on 11 October 2014, featuring numerous national and international punk-rock bands.

=== Harvest (2017) ===
On 7 February 2017, F.O.D. released their third album Harvest. As before it was released worldwide, on same 4 record labels: Funtime Records (Belgium), Effervescence Records (Europe), Bird Attack Records (North America) and Bells On Records (Japan). Harvest, a darker album, written in the slipstream of a divorce. The melodies are still there, more soaring than ever, but the overall mood is a bit less happy, the music a bit more aggressive. Again the band releases the album at their own festival.

=== Punkrock 4 Life (2017) ===
On November 8, 2017, F.O.D. released a new single for charity: "Hope For A Moment" by F.O.D. & Friends. The song was released in the context of "Music For Life", a yearly action for charity by Belgian national radio station Studio Brussel and in favor of 'Wereld-Delen', which tries to improve the well-being of disadvantaged people. They recorded this one with people from Belgian Punk rock and metal scene like Dieter (Flatcat), Roos Van Acker, Tim Van Doorn, Hanne (For I Am), Jeroen (Fleddy Melculy) and Steven (Off The Cross). Extra track: 'Bakske Vol Met Stro' by Urbanus.

=== Sleepville (2020) ===
In March 2020, F.O.D. released their widely anticipated fourth album Sleepville. It is a more experimental album exploring the boundaries of punk rock, even using classical instruments in the arrangements. The lyrics tell the story of Annie, a fictional character. The album consists of 2 discs and comes with a book that tells the full story of Annie - with accompanying linocut artwork by Jelle Meys. Due to bad timing (release 1 week before the global pandemic and lockdowns), the album did not get the promotion and tours it deserved and got a bit 'forgotten'.

=== The Once A Virgin Club (2024) ===
On April 5, 2024, F.O.D. released their album The Once A Virgin Club. It had been announced as a return to their roots, being less experimental and more straight forward than Sleepville. The record consists of 12 tracks with a total playing time of 27:08 minutes. Despite the simpler overall direction, the album shows a further development of the harmonies and vocal arrangements. The release was accompanied by a switch to the labels SBÄM and Double Helix Records. Stefan Beham, owner of SBÄM, also developed the cover artwork. The cover and title refer to growing older and reflecting on one's own youth, while the lyrics do not follow an overarching concept this time, but deal with various topics. The album was celebrated with a release party in Duffel, Belgium, and followed by a tour through Germany, Czech Republic, Austria and Slovenia.

== Band members ==
F.O.D. consists of four members:

- Hans Roofthooft (guitar, lead vocals)
- Stijn de Waele (backing vocals)
- Pierre Janssens (bass)
- Lode de Feyter (drums)

== Discography ==
F.O.D. has released five full albums, an EP, and a 7":

- Dance To This (EP, released on 2 December 2011)
- Ontario (Album, released on 11 February 2013)
- Something More (7", released on 6 February 2014)
- Tricks Of The Trade (Album, released on 23 September 2014)
- Harvest (Album, released on 7 February 2017)
- Punkrock 4 Life (Single/EP, released on 8 November 2017)
- Sleepville (Album, released on 12 March 2020)
- Sleepville II (Album, released on 27 November 2020)

== Videography ==
F.O.D. has produced various official videos for the songs on their albums:

- Carry On (published on 12 April 2012)
- Ontario (published on 26 May 2013)
- Something More (published on 6 February 2014)
- Dear Grace (published on 29 July 2014)
- Soundtrack of My Life (published on 25 September 2014)
- Crew You (published on 3 November 2016)
- Act of Consecration (published on 28 December 2016)
- Last (published on 23 January 2017)
- Hope For A Moment (published on 8 November 2017)
- Feeling Gay (published on 14 February 2020)
- Annie (published on 12 March 2020)
- Letter To Laura (published on 23 October 2020)
- Perfect Match (published on 4 September 2020)
