= Call It Off =

Call It Off may refer to:

- Call It Off (band), Dutch pop punk band
- "Call It Off", a single from Ratchet by Shamir
- "Call It Off", a song from The Con by Tegan and Sara
