= Hardcore for Syria =

Compilation album by various artists
- Released: 2012
- Genres: Punk rock, hardcore punk
- Length: 82:38
- Producer: Hardcore4Syria

Hardcore for Syria is a punk and hardcore punk compilation album put together with 30 bands from around the world. It was released as a free download by Hardcore4Syria, an online media awareness project established to support the victims of the humanitarian crisis in Syria.

== Track listing ==
Hardcore for Syria, Vol. 1 :

1. "Borrow and Bomb" — Off! — 0:44 — United States
2. "Tahrir Square Dance" — The Kominas — 1:39 — USA
3. "The Ranks of the Masses Rising" — Anti-Flag — 2:28 — USA
4. "We Will Stop You" — ZSK — 3:17 — Germany
5. "Different Hearts, Different Minds" — Atlas Losing Grip — 3:06 — Sweden
6. "Can't Have Me" — Agent Attitude — 1:34 — Sweden
7. "Never Negotiate" — Raised Fist — 2:55 — Sweden
8. "Big Slice" — Unhold — 4:37 — Switzerland
9. "Wounded Tiger Bites Harder" — Onesta — 2:14 — France
10. "Guilty" — Animal Instinct — 1:06 — Switzerland
11. "Skindeep" — This is History — 1:37 — Netherlands
12. "Wild World" — Word Up! — 1:05 — Australia
13. "Saving Private Honesty" — Waterdown — 3:07 — Germany
14. "Not What You Think" — Crank — 2:58 — Australia
15. "The New Age" — The Go Set — 3:42 — Australia
16. "City Lights" — Parties Break Hearts — 3:59 — Switzerland
17. "Stand Your Ground" — Ticking Bombs — 2:12 — Sweden
18. "Bastards Way" — The Strapones — 2:21 — Switzerland
19. "Together We're Stronger" — 59 Times the Pain — 1:18 — Sweden
20. "Time 2 Fight" — Topnovil — 1:49 — Australia
21. "Vi Har Fått Nog" ("We've Had Enough") — Kvoteringen — 2:48 — Sweden
22. "Bullets and Tear Gas" — Zinc — 3:51 — Syria
23. "Bitte Was?!" ("Say What?") — Entwaffnung — 1:44 — Switzerland
24. "Gravity on Hold" — Anti-Everything — 2:53 — Trinidad And Tobago
25. "Think Global, Act Local" — Play to Destroy — 2:30 — Switzerland
26. "Child Curse" — Bearfoot — 2:40 — USA
27. "Suicidal Pathway" — Unveil — 2:45 — Switzerland
28. "Born To Ruin" — Swarm — 4:58 — Sweden
29. "Demokrati?" ("Democracy?") — Desperat — 1:31 — Sweden
30. "Psalm of the Sniper" — Al Thawra — 9:10 — USA

== See also ==
- Syrian civil war
