= Flatcat =

Flatcat may refer to

- Flat cat, a fictional Martian species
- Flatcat (band)
- Flat-headed cat, a small wild cat of the Thai-Malay Peninsula, Borneo and Sumatra
