= Meerhout =

- Municipality
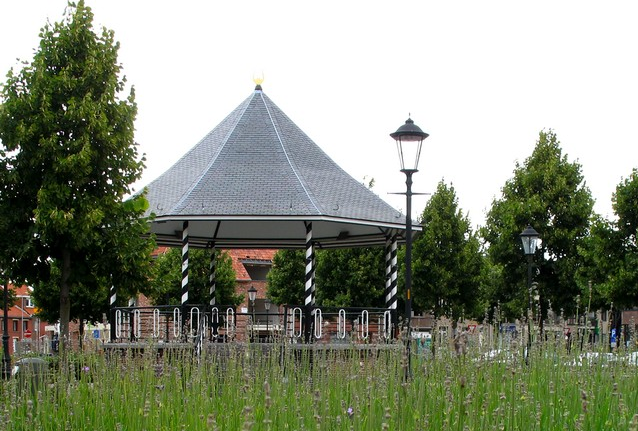

- Flag Coat of arms

- Location of Meerhout in the province of Antwerp
- Interactive map of Meerhout
- Location in Belgium
- Coordinates: 51°08′N 05°05′E
- Country: Belgium
- Community: Flemish Community
- Region: Flemish Region
- Province: Antwerp
- Arrondissement: Turnhout

Government
  - Mayor: Nele Geudens (CD&V)
  - Governing party: CD (CD&V)

Area
  - Total: 36.54 km^{2} (14.11 sq mi)

Population (2020-01-01)
  - Total: 10,324
  - Density: 282.5/km^{2} (731.8/sq mi)
- Postal codes: 2450
- NIS code: 13021
- Area codes: 014
- Website: www.meerhout.be

Meerhout (Dutch pronunciation: [ˈmeːrɦʌut]) is a municipality located in the Belgian province of Antwerp. The municipality only comprises the town of Meerhout proper. In 2021, Meerhout had a total population of 10,279. The total area is 36.29 km^{2} which gives a population density of 264 inhabitants per km^{2}. In Meerhout some famous people have lived, like Kate Ryan (well known in France and Belgium, The UK, Turkey, Spain and the rest of western Europe).

Meerhout is a part of the Economic Network of the Albertkanaal (Albert Canal, named after King Albert 1).

== Demographics ==
As of 1 January 2008, there are 9578 people living in Meerhout. 50.4% of them are men, 49.6% are women. Most people are older than 40.

19th century
Year	1806	1816	1830	1846	1856	1866	1876	1880	1890
Population	2534	2845	3237	3633	3659	3664	3871	4043	4363
Note: results as of 31/12

20th century until reform
Year	1900	1910	1920	1930	1947	1961	1970	1976
Population	4531	5362	5871	6197	7189	7945	8567	8521
Note: results as of 31/12

After reform
Year	1977	1980	1985	1990	1995	2000	2005	2006	2007	2008
Population	8521	8644	8790	9070	9190	9192	9317	9361	9463	9578
Note: results as of 01/01 - Source: National Institute of Statistics Belgium (NIS)

== Tourism ==
There is quite a lot of tourism in Meerhout. Tourist routes include the "drieprovincieënroute" (three provinces route), which is a cycling route going through the provinces of Antwerp, Flemish Brabant and Limburg. There are also some B&Bs available, and most shopkeepers understand English. Meerhout is popular among people from the Netherlands, Germany and Ireland. Some (older) English people visit Meerhout too because of "The Wing" and other memorial icons of WW2. Every year, around the last week-end of April, around 30,000 people travel to Meerhout to go to Groezrock, one of the world's largest punk rock festivals.

== Education ==
There are only 5 schools in Meerhout, these schools are both Pre- and Primary schools for children between the age of 3 and 12 years old.

There are secondary schools in the neighbourhood which are easily reachable by public transport or car/bicycle, in Geel, Mol, Diest and Tessenderlo.

== Sports ==
A cyclo-cross competition is held in October.

== Media ==
Meerhout had its own radio station, "MeerGoud" (MeerHout=>Meergoud, Goud means "Gold"), but it ceased broadcasting in 2006.

== Notable Inhabitant ==
- Kate Ryan (Female artist, won several awards, also well known in France, and getting more famous in other countries all over Europe)
