= Anti-Everything =

Punk band from Trinidad and Tobago

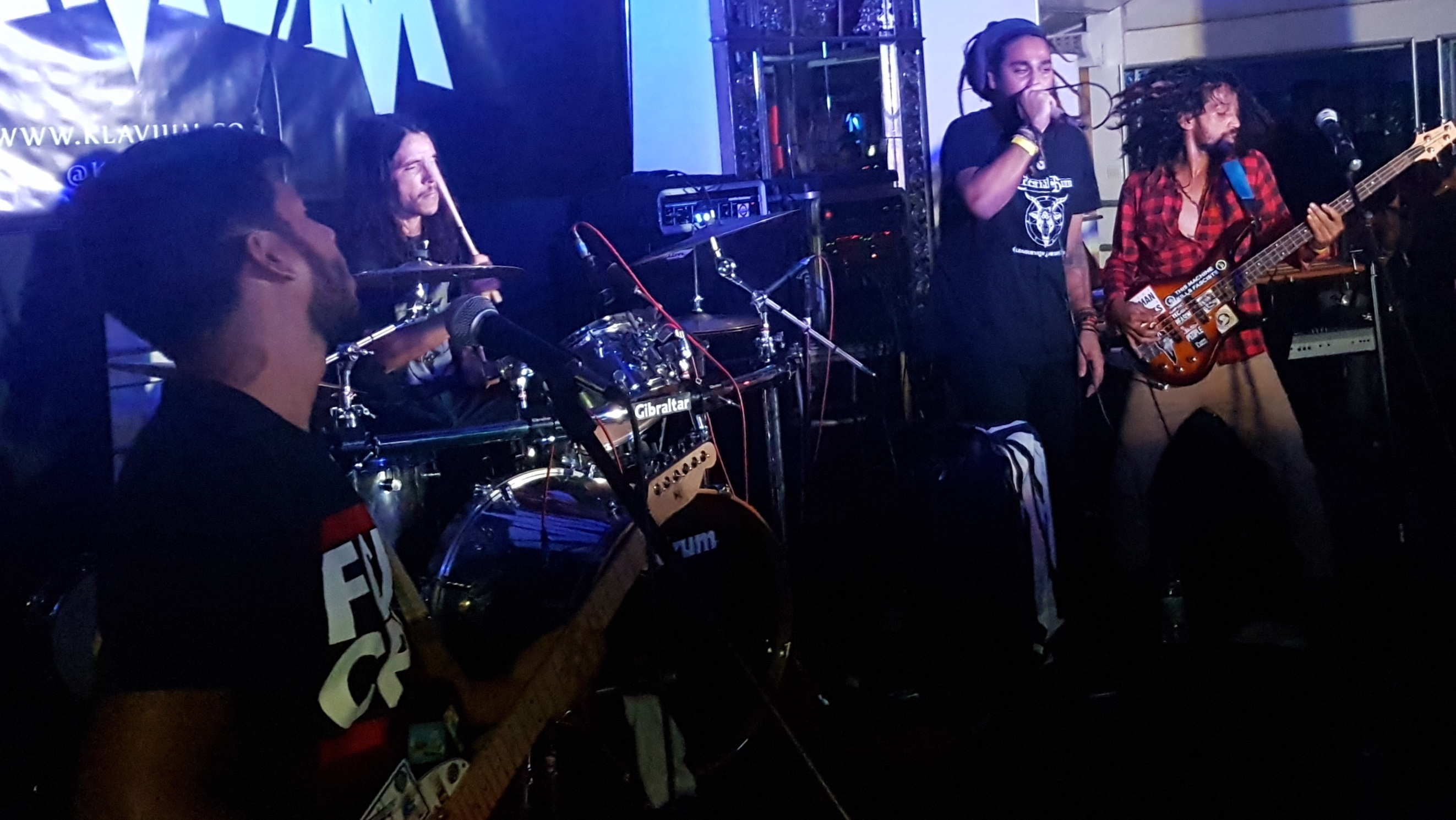
- Riaz Ali, Jon Otway, Bryan Khan, Allan Bachan 2019

Background information
- Origin: Trinidad and Tobago
- Genres: Punk rock
- Years active: 2000–present
- Label: Boatshrimp Records
- Members: Bryan "Blinky" Khan (vocals); Riaz Amir Ali (guitar); Allan "Alloz" Bachan (bass); Jon "Otto" Otway (drums); Randy Ali (guitar, trombone, steel pan)
- Past members: Adam Arneaud († 2003) (bass), Syam Nath (2010-2015, guitar)
- Website: www.antieverything.tt

Anti-Everything is a punk band from Trinidad and Tobago. They are the only punk band in said country.

== History ==
Anti-Everything was founded in 2000 in St. Joseph, about 11 km east of the capital Port of Spain. At its founding, all of the members were teenagers, and the band name was chosen to express a general attitude of denial.

In the early 2010s, singer Bryan Khan and guitarist Randy Ali moved to Europe. Since then, the band has primarily developed their songs through online cooperation and recorded during the temporary periods when all of the members are in Trinidad.

In 2019, Anti-Everything was the first Trinidadian rock band to complete a European tour (through Belgium, France, Germany, the Netherlands and Spain). In 2022, the band completed another European tour through ten countries.

== Style ==
Anti-Everything plays punk rock music with elements of alternative rock. The band names several punk bands as influential, including both old school (Black Flag, Minor Threat, Bad Brains) and new school (Strike Anywhere) artists. In addition, the band cites calypso interpreters as influences as, in the past, they were not afraid to broach controversial issues that were taboo in public at that time. Their music commonly uses steelpan and includes references to reggae, dub, and ska. The lyrics of Anti-Everything's songs mainly address political and social conflicts, often touching their home country Trinidad and Tobago. At times, their lyrics also deal with personal topics such as the search for an identity or take on a pure fun character.

== Discography ==
=== Albums ===
- 2009: The International Conspiracy to Push You Down (Boatshrimp Records)
- 2011: Children of a Globalised World (Boatshrimp Records)

=== EPs ===
- 2010: Decision 2010 (Boatshrimp Records)
- 2010: Please Do Your Job (Properly) (Boatshrimp Records)
- 2015: A Folly of Its Own (Boatshrimp Records)
- 2017: Harbour Ties (Boatshrimp Records)
- 2018: Congestión (Boatshrimp Records)
- 2020: Fowl Fete (Boatshrimp Records)
- 2021: COAGX (Boatshrimp Records)
- 2023: Generational Trauma (Boatshrimp Records)
- 2024: Green (Split w/ Luguber) (Boatshrimp Records/Beerput Records)

=== Sampler contributions ===
- 2007: Boatshrimp Records Sampler Volume 1 (Boatshrimp Records, track "Way Too Long")
- 2007: Boatshrimp Records Sampler Volume 2 (Boatshrimp Records, tracks "Jimmy" and "Crowded")
- 2007: Greenlight Network Vol. 1 (Greenlight Network, track "The Way We Choose to Live Our Lives")
- 2011: Punktology Vol. 1 (Punk Outlaw Records, tracks "New Generation" and "Ratchet Design")
- 2012: Hardcore 4 Syria (Hardcore 4 Syria, track "Gravity On Hold")
