= Because No One Stopped Us =

Studio album by Belvedere
- Released: 1998
- Genre: Skate punk

Belvedere chronology
Because No One Stopped Us (1998)	Angels Live in My Town (2000)

Because No One Stopped Us is the debut album from Belvedere, released in 1998.

== Track listing ==
1. "The Bottom Line" – 2:36
2. "Danky" – 1:27
3. "Talk Show" – 2:04
4. "Bad Day" – 2:13
5. "High School Heroics" – 2:18
6. "Pass The Joe" – 0:24
7. "Market Share" – 2:03
8. "Spark" –
9. "Lemmings" – 2:47
10. "Subversive" – 2:22
11. "Circus" – 2:32
12. "My Girlfriend Only Likes Me When She's Drunk" – 0:57
13. "Concept" – 2:51
14. "High Priced" – 2:11
15. "Class A Jackass" – 2:30
