= The Revenge of the Fifth =

2016 skate punk album by Belvedere

Studio album by Belvedere
- Released: April 30, 2016
- Studio: Echo Base Studio in Calgary, Alberta, Canada
- Genre: Skate punk, melodic hardcore, punk rock, pop punk
- Length: 33:22
- Label: Bird Attack Records

Belvedere chronology
Fast Forward Eats the Tape (2004)	The Revenge of the Fifth (2016)

Professional ratings
Review scores
Source	Rating
Broken Arrow Magazine	7.5/10 stars
For the Love of Punk	No Rating
Original Rock	9/10 stars
Out of Step Fanzine	9/10 stars
The Punk Archive	No Rating
PunkNews	4.5/5 stars
Punktastic	No Rating
PureRawk.com	3/5 stars
RMP Magazine	7/10 stars
Vandala Magazine	3/5 stars

The Revenge of the Fifth is the fifth studio album by Canadian skate punk band Belvedere, released April 30, 2016. It is their first full-length release since 2004's Fast Forward Eats the Tape. The album was recorded by Casey Lewis at Echo Base Studio in Calgary, Alberta, Canada. It was mixed by Andrew Berlin and mastered by Jason Livermore at the Blasting Room in Fort Collins, Colorado. It is the first album to feature Casey Lewis on drums, replacing Graham Churchill.

== Background and promotion ==
Belvedere temporarily disbanded in 2005., during which lead singer Steve Rawles and drummer Graham Churchill recorded two albums with their new band, This Is a Standoff. Following a six-year hiatus, Belvedere reformed in 2011 for a reunion tour that took place the next year. During the reunion tour, the band performed several sold-out shows, including the band's first show in Tokyo, Japan, in a decade; sold-out shows alongside A Wilhelm Scream in Toronto and Montreal; and some shows in Brazil alongside Less Than Jake. The consistent and resounding success of the tour inspired the band to work on new music: "When things are going really good, you're playing these big shows, everyone is getting along [...] you're like... why the hell not? Why would we not keep doing this? After a couple years, we were ready for a new record, so we started piecing it together."

In November 2015, Belvedere announced they were working on recording a new album, this time with Casey Lewis replacing Graham Churchill on drums due to Churchill's conflicting commitments. Belvedere spent the prior year "slowly writing" and demoing the tracks before recording the new album in Casey Lewis's studio "casually [...] over all of 2015".

Rawles said in an interview before the album's release, "It's not gonna be the same record [as before]. There's a different drummer on there, it's been twelve years [...] We look at life a little bit differently. Though we have been a fast band our whole lives and still are, it's not just about 260 beats per minute for a minute and a half straight, you know. We like changing it up a little bit. We are able to put forth an aggressive song regardless of how fast it is." Rawles said the album would showcase "some of [Belvedere's] heavier stuff." After release, reviewers noted that the lyrical content on The Revenge of the Fifth was more mature than content from the band's previous albums, particularly on the closing tracks "Carpe Diem" and "Generation Debt." While promoting the album after release, Rawles stated that he hoped the album demonstrated that the band could stay in touch with their roots while still maturing in their style: "When I think of all of the records that we've made along the way, I feel like there's elements of those in this record, but I think there is some new stuff. When I talk about a progressing, you get back to that whole thing of, 'Oh, they're slowing down, they're getting old' – I don't feel we went that way. We pushed it in a new direction, but we kept the band that we were."

After releasing the album, Belvedere embarked on a short Canadian tour with a few festival dates in France, during which they opened for NOFX and performed alongside Pennywise and Zebrahead.

== Critical reception ==
The more positive reviews of The Revenge of the Fifth complimented the band for succeeding at their goals of introducing new and matured elements to their familiar sound. The relatively mixed reviews critiqued the band's adherence to their old sound, which the reviewers perceived as limiting Belvedere's ability to demonstrate maturation.

Of the positive reviews, PunkNews reviewer Maximillian Power rated the album 4.5 stars out of 5, complimenting the band for "[managing] to craft a new record that is still the same Belvedere [he] loved years ago, but with a well placed modern influence," also complimenting the "clean and updated production quality." Power also noted the band's ability to integrate elements of skate punk's speed, pop punk's melodic sensibilities and choruses, and metal's technicality in forming their sound. He singled out "Delicastressin" as a highlight of the album. Out of Step Fanzine gave the album the same rating and also complimented Belvedere's combination of "technical skate punk, melodical punk rock and catchy pop punk tunes." While not rating the album, For the Love of Punk writer Jay Caption complimented Casey Lewis as an effective addition to the band's sound due to "the depth that he brings to the sound of the album" and his ability to provide well-suited "backup vocals and harmonies."

Vandala Magazine reviewer Dustin Griffin rated the album 3 stars out of 5, as did PureRawk reviewer Tom Mimnagh. Griffin stated that the band's attempts to "recapture their core sound and tap into whatever was making them tick back in the day" also "[got] in the way of the songwriting[,] which is otherwise strong throughout," unfavorably comparing them to a recent comeback attempt by melodic hardcore band Good Riddance. Mimnagh complimented the band's proficient performances while calling the band's sound and subgenre "somewhat limited." Griffin singled out "Hairline," "Red Pawn's Race," and "The Architect" as album highlights, while Mimnagh stated that the song "Years" best demonstrated what the band aimed to accomplish with the album.

== Track listing ==
No.	Title	Length
1.	"Shipwreck"	2:43
2.	"Hairline"	2:49
3.	"Years"	1:53
4.	"Transmissions"	1:23
5.	"Delicastressin"	2:37
6.	"Revenge of the Fifth"	3:05
7.	"Red Pawn's Race"	4:07
8.	"Achilles"	3:03
9.	"The Architect"	3:11
10.	"As Above, So Below"	1:03
11.	"Carpe Per Diem"	2:54
12.	"Generation Debt"	4:27
Total length:		33:22

== Personnel ==
- Steve Rawles – lead vocals, rhythm guitar
- Scott Marshal – lead guitar
- Jason Sinclair – bass
- Casey Lewis – drums, backing vocals
