= Fast Forward Eats the Tape =

2004 album by Canadian punk band Belvedere

Studio album by Belvedere
- Released: May 18, 2004
- Recorded: Fall 2003
- Studio: Sundae Sound Studios, Canada
- Genre: Melodic hardcore; skate punk
- Length: 40:48
- Label: Union Label Group
- Producer: Blair Calibaba, Belvedere

Belvedere chronology
'Twas Hell Said Former Child (2003)	Fast Forward Eats the Tape (2004)	The Revenge of the Fifth (2016)

Singles from Fast Forward Eats the Tape
- 1. "Closed Doors"; 2. "Slaves to the Pavement"; 3. "Elementally Regarded"

Professional ratings
Review scores
Source	Rating
AllMusic	4.5/5 stars
Punknews.org	3.5/5 stars

Fast Forward Eats the Tape is the fourth studio album by Calgary melodic hardcore/skate punk band Belvedere, released on May 18, 2004. It would be their final full-length release before they went on hiatus, which ended in 2012; the band would not release another album until Revenge of the Fifth in June 2016. In 2016, a reviewer from Vandala Magazine covering Revenge of the Fifth would retrospectively refer to Fast Forward Eats the Tape as Belvedere's "best known album".

== Background ==
Lead singer and rhythm guitarist Steve Rawles stated that the album's title followed a trend within the rest of Belvedere's album titles, where every one featured five words and six syllables. The band also chose the title for Fast Forward Eats the Tape based on the fact that it was their fourth album, and their subsequent albums, Revenge of the Fifth from 2016 and Hindsight Is the Sixth Sense from 2021, would continue the same theme with their titles: "So we had this template and also our last couple of albums were going in a numerical direction. Fast Forward Eats the Tape, The Revenge of the Fifth, Hindsight [is] – well you get the point."

Blair Calibaba, a producer who has mixed albums for Sum 41, also produced Fast Forward Eats the Tape. The album was recorded in autumn 2003 at Sundae Sound Studios in Calgary.

Following the release of the album, Belvedere embarked on a tour called the Grind Tour throughout Canada, alongside Bigwig, Death by Stereo, Tsunami Bomb, and Misconduct.

In 2012, Belvedere released Fast Forward Eats the Tape on vinyl in a collaboration with Jump Start Records.

The album contains one re-recorded song from their previous album, 'Twas Hell Said Former Child ("Two Minutes for Looking So Good"), and one re-recorded song from their split release with fellow Canadian band Downway ("Brandy Wine").

== Track listing ==
All tracks are written by Jason Sinclair, unless otherwise noted.

No.	Title	Writer(s)	Length
1.	"Subhuman Nature"		2:18
2.	"Three's a Crowd"		2:46
3.	"Closed Doors"	Rawles	3:20
4.	"Unplugged"		2:27
5.	"Quicksand"		2:30
6.	"Two Minutes for Looking So Good"	Rawles	2:43
7.	"All About Perspectives"		3:02
8.	"Elementally Regarded"		1:21
9.	"Brandy Wine"	Sinclair, Rawles	2:52
10.	"Stain"		3:16
11.	"Slaves to the Pavement"		2:59
12.	"Early Retirement"	Rawles	1:24
13.	"Popular Inquiries into Everyday Disasters"		3:12
14.	"Bad Decisions"		2:30
15.	"Anesthetic"		4:08
Total length:			40:48

== Critical reception and legacy ==
AllMusic reviewer Stewart Mason granted the album 4.5 stars out of 5, stating that the album "trumps [Belvedere's] earlier efforts [...] by upping their incipient melodic skills [while] also adding just a hint of metal to their sound," complimenting the album's "mix of poppy choruses, big guitar riffs and inescapable velocity," while also praising the band's display of their full potential.

PunkNews reviewer Adam White granted the album 3.5 stars out of 5. In his review, he also pointed out Belvedere's penchant for "big metallic riffs" while complimenting the album's integration of those riffs compared to Belvedere's previous efforts. However, White criticized the album's production for making the music feel "thin" and lessening each song's potential impact. White distinguished "Closed Doors," "Quicksand," "All About Perspectives," "Slaves to the Pavement," and the band's remake of "Brandy Wine" as standout tracks.

A reviewer for The Nerve complimented the album's "tight melodic punk" and favorably compared the band to Millencolin. In 2008, a reviewer for Revista NOIZE magazine, Gustavo Corréa, recommended the album by including it in a list of "indispensable albums" within the melodic hardcore subgenre; the list also recommended Belvedere's previous album 'Twas Hell Said Former Child, as well as Siren Song of the Counter Culture by Rise Against.

In February 2024, a staff member and editor from Dying Scene declared Fast Forward Eats the Tape the 4th greatest punk album of all time, calling it "a criminally underrated record by an equally underappreciated band" and "an essential skate punk record," as well as calling it Belvedere's best album.

== Personnel ==
- Steve Rawles – vocals, rhythm guitar
- Scott Marshall – lead guitar
- Jason Sinclair – bass
- Graham Churchill – drums
