= 59 Times the Pain =

Swedish hardcore punk band

- Origin: Fagersta, Sweden
- Genres: Hardcore punk, punk rock
- Years active: 1992–2001, 2008
- Labels: Burning Heart Records, Epitaph, Genet
- Members: Magnus Larnhed; Niklas Lundgren; Toni Virtanen; Michael Conradsson
- Past members: Kai Kalliomäki

59 Times the Pain was a Swedish hardcore punk band. They were active from 1992 until 2001.

The band was formed in Fagersta, Sweden in 1992 by Magnus Larnhed (Vocals / guitar), Michael Conradsson (bass), Toni Virtanen (drums) and Kai Kalliomäki (guitar). Their band name is taken from a Hüsker Dü song. Kalliomäki soon left the band to be replaced by Niklas Lundgren, who left hardcore band "Dislars" later to become the more known Burst. Their first demo "Feeling Down" got some attention from Burning Heart Records, and in 1993, the band signed to the label. The following year the band recorded their debut album Blind Anger & Hate.

In March 1995, 59 Times the Pain started recording their second full-length album, More Out of Today at Unisound. The underground success of More Out of Today and the debut single "Blind Anger & Hate" allowed 59 Times the Pain to establish themselves as a successful band. They did this through extensive touring, with their shows gaining excellent reviews.

Their fourth album, End of the Millennium, was released in March 1999 with their fifth (and final) album, Calling The Public, released in 2001. The band also had songs included on several compilations, including 1999's Short Music for Short People and Punk-O-Rama Vol. 4. The band split in 2001. On January 30, 2008 they announced that they were reforming to play Groezrock festival.

== Band members ==
- Magnus Larnhed – vocals, guitar
- Niklas Lundgren – guitar
- Toni Virtanen – drums
- Michael Conradsson – bass

=== Past members ===
- Kai Kalliomäki – guitar

== Discography ==
=== Full-length albums ===
- Blind Anger & Hate - 1994
- More Out of Today - 1995
- Twenty Percent of My Hand - (1997, Genet)
- End of the Millennium - 1999
- Calling the Public - 2001

=== EPs ===
- Even More Out Of Today - 1995
- Music For Hardcorepunx - 1998
- Turn At 25th - 1999
- 59 Times the Pain / Subterranean Kids (1999, split, Tralla Records)

=== Music Videos ===
- More Out of Today (1995)
- Can't Change Me (1997)
- Turn at 25th (1999)

=== Compilations ===
- Punk+ - 1995
- Cheap Shots vol.1 - 1995
- Cheap Shots vol.2 - 1996
- Cheap Shots vol.3 - 1997
- Punk-O-Rama Vol. 4 - 1999
- Short Music for Short People - 1999
- Cheap Shots vol.4 - 2000
- Cheap Shots vol.5 - 2001
- Hang The VJ (video) - 2001
- Hardcore for Syria - 2012
