= Angels Live in My Town =

Studio album by Belvedere
- Released: 2000
- Genre: Punk

Belvedere chronology
Because No One Stopped Us (1998)	Angels Live in My Town (2000)	'Twas Hell Said Former Child (2002)

Angels Live in My Town is the second album from Belvedere, released in 2000.

Punknews.org rated the album four stars and stated, "this is a great album and I would recommend it to any punker."

== Track listing ==
Angels Live in My Town track listing
No.	Title	Length
1.	"2nd Column"	3:05
2.	"The People's Song"	2:30
3.	"Difference"	3:01
4.	"Malpractice"	2:34
5.	"Airplane"	1:53
6.	"669 – The Number of the Feast"	1:35
7.	"Mediator"	2:53
8.	"Weekend Warrior"	1:06
9.	"Todd"	1:59
10.	"Not My Problem"	2:19
11.	"Male Pattern Impotence"	1:48
12.	"Condiment King"	0:32
13.	"Sik Salvation"	5:57
Total length:		32:12
