= Calling the Public =

Studio album by 59 Times the Pain
- Released: April 9, 2001
- Recorded: Music a Matic, November 2000
- Genre: Punk rock
- Length: 36 minutes
- Label: Burning Heart Records
- Producer: Kent Norberg

59 Times The Pain chronology
End of the Millennium (1999)	Calling the Public (2001)

Professional ratings
Review scores
Source	Rating
AllMusic	4.5/5 stars
Big Cheese	4/5 stars
Drowned in Sound	6/10

Calling the Public is an album by 59 Times the Pain. It was released through the record label Burning Heart Records in 2001. It was received well by critics, who hailed the return of the old-school punks. Calling the Public was the band's last full-length album.

== Critical reception ==
AllMusic wrote: "Like Rancid, the band may show their influences, but still handle them with aplomb and always mix them up."

== Track listing ==
1. "Rock the City" – 1:52
2. "Welcome To The 21st Century" – 2:59
3. "Calling the Public" – 3:12
4. "Classaction" – 3:17
5. "Cash on Delivery" – 3:07
6. "Dead on a Day Like This" – 2:26
7. "Upgraded System" – 2:39
8. "Freedom Station" – 3:32
9. "Room with a View" – 1:52
10. "Addicted" – 2:23
11. "My Life My Choice My Call" – 3:36
12. "The Emergency" – 4:10
