= Atlas Losing Grip =

Swedish punk rock band

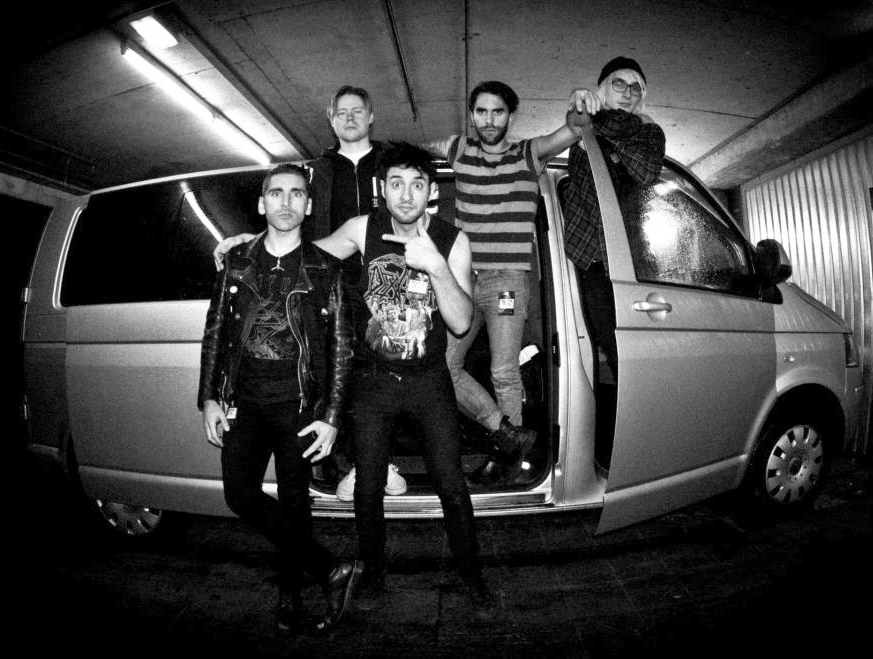
- Atlas Losing Grip, from left to right: Rodrigo Alfaro, Max Huddén, Stefan Bratt, Julian Guedj and Gustav Burn.

Background information
- Origin: Lund, Sweden
- Genres: Punk rock, melodic hardcore
- Years active: 2005–2016
- Labels: Black Star Foundation
- Members: Niklas Olsson; Stefan Bratt; Gustav Burn; Max Huddén; Julian Guedj
- Past members: Rodrigo Alfaro 2009-2014
- Website: atlaslosinggrip.com

Atlas Losing Grip was a Swedish punk rock band from Lund, Sweden, founded in 2005.

== History ==
=== 2005-2009 Founding and Shut The World Out ===
The band was founded in 2005 by Stefan Bratt (bass and vocals) and Gustav Burn (guitar). After some line-up changes and two demos in 2006 and 2007, the formation completed by Max Huddén (guitar) and Julian Guedj (drums) was steady, before they entered the studio to record their first album, Shut The World Out in October 2007, which was released in July, 2008. An excessive European tour followed in the next 18 months. When in 2009 the worldwide respected Swedish icon Rodrigo Alfaro, who had been in bands such as Satanic Surfers or Venerea, joined the band, Atlas Losing Grip became a five-piece.

=== 2009-2013 Watching The Horizon and State Of Unrest ===
In 2009 the band stopped its concert-activities for that year with a tour in Greece, before they wrote and recorded the 5-Song-EP, which was released in the same year on Black Star Foundation Records. In early 2010 they started a headliner tour, which led through countries such as Slovenia, Italy, Switzerland, Germany, France, Belgium, Netherlands before in Summer, they played a few festivals and a short Scandinavian tour with Bad Religion. In May the second album State Of Unrest was released, which was recorded by guitarist Gustav Burn and mastered at the Blasting Room by Jason Livermore. The record earned perfect scores in press all over the world, so it was an easy thing to start their by then most extensive and two-year lasting tour, that sent them for the first time also to other continents than Europe, such as South America. Tours with bands like Millencolin, NOFX, ZSK, No Fun At All, or Billy Talent were completed at that time, as well as the recording of a 7" single that includes acoustic songs, only.

=== 2013-2014: Departure of Rodrigo Alfaro and arrival of Niklas Olsson ===
In February 2013, the band entered a studio in Sweden to begin recording their 3rd album, but a few times they left to play festivals. A video-blog was released to summarize the work in the studio with interviews of the band members. On October 8, 2014, the band announced the release of their third album, Currents, four years after State Of Unrest in North America, Europe and Australia on January 16, 2015. On November 25, 2014, Atlas Losing Grip announced they had parted ways with Rodrigo and replaced him with Niklas Olsson. However, Rodrigo's vocals were still used on Currents. A few of the tracks were later re-released with Niklas's vocals, including the band's official music videos.

=== 2014-2016: Currents and disbanding ===
The album Currents was released on January 16, 2015.

After 11 years of making music, on April 13, 2016, the band announced that they were disbanding.

== Musical and lyrical reception ==
The band combines the lightness of Melodic Punk with the heaviness and the technical playfulness of Heavy metal and Speed metal. Each musician takes his personal role in this. Julian Guedj includes a lot of chosen Heavy Metal elements into his drumming and uses, uncommon for a Punk-drummer, four tom-toms. Stefan Bratt uses the whole scale of his bass guitar's neck and plays a lot of challenging and high bass runs, while Gustav Burn and Max Huddén constantly bring in technical double lead guitar harmony sounds (similar to Thin Lizzy, Iron Maiden, Def Leppard), both, in solo and rhythm parts. The vocals of Rodrigo Alfaro are strong but clean, most of the time. He sings Tenor and the majority of his lyrics deal with personal experiences, some of them are encoded.

== Band members ==
Final line-up:

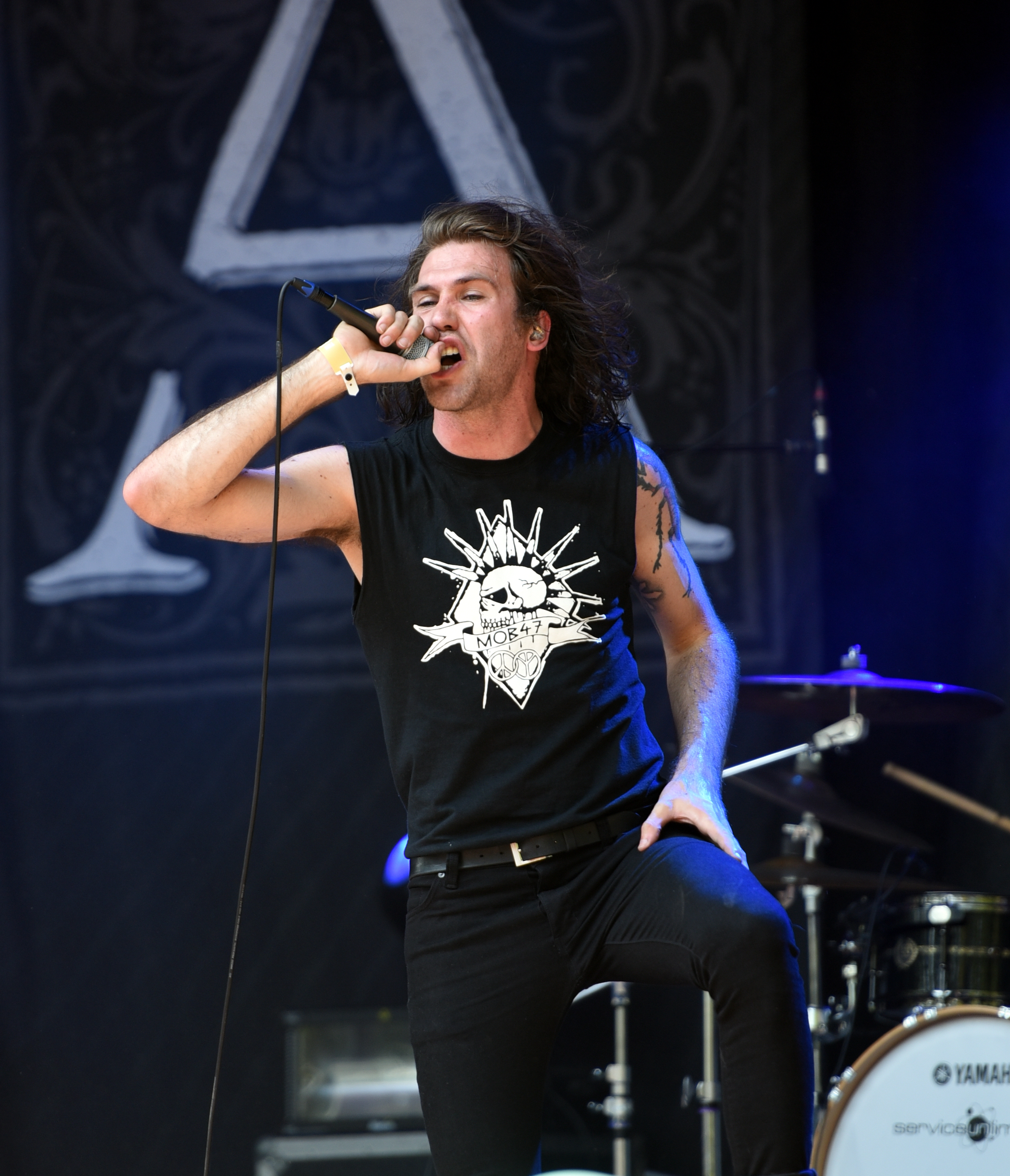
Niklas Olsson

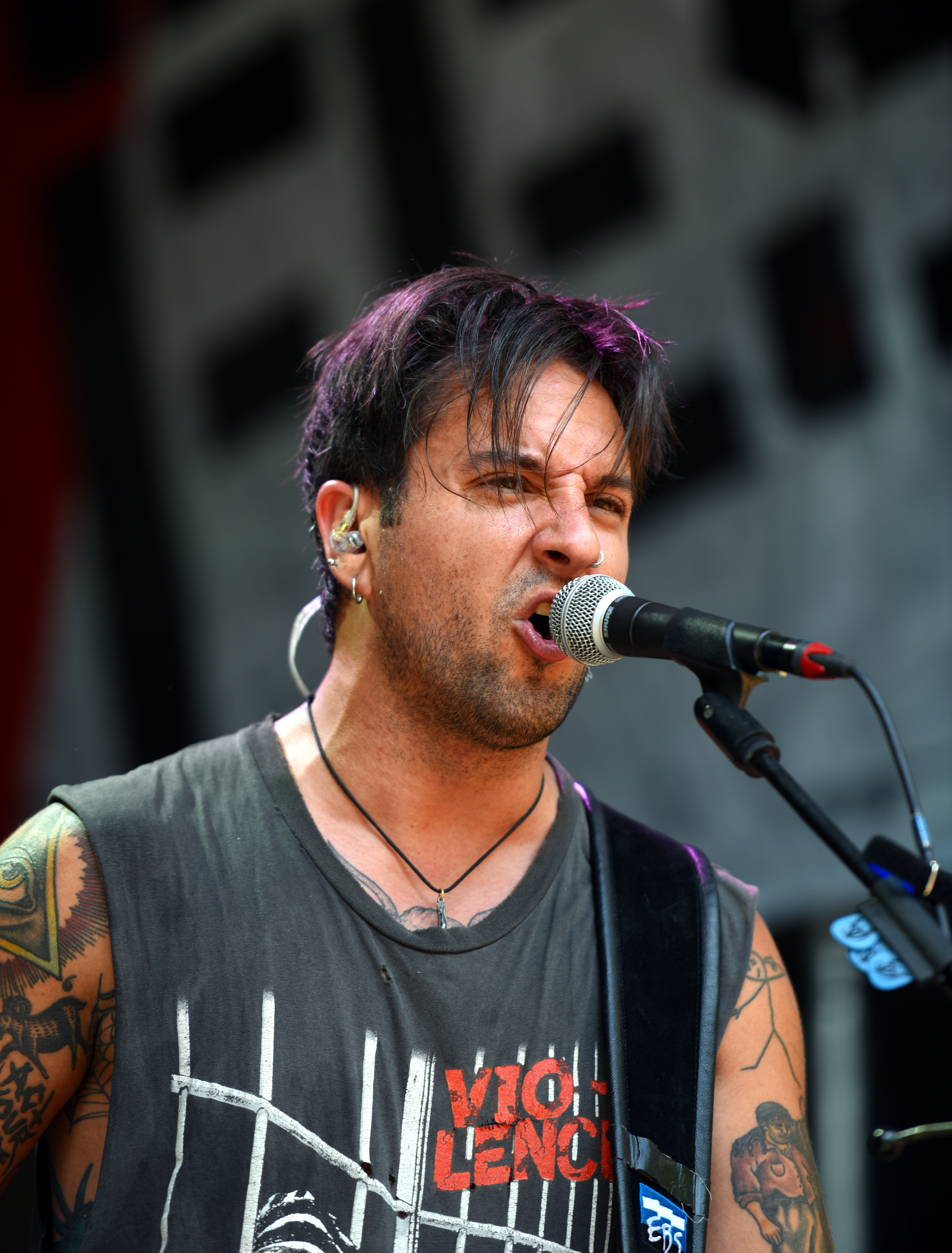
Stefan Bratt

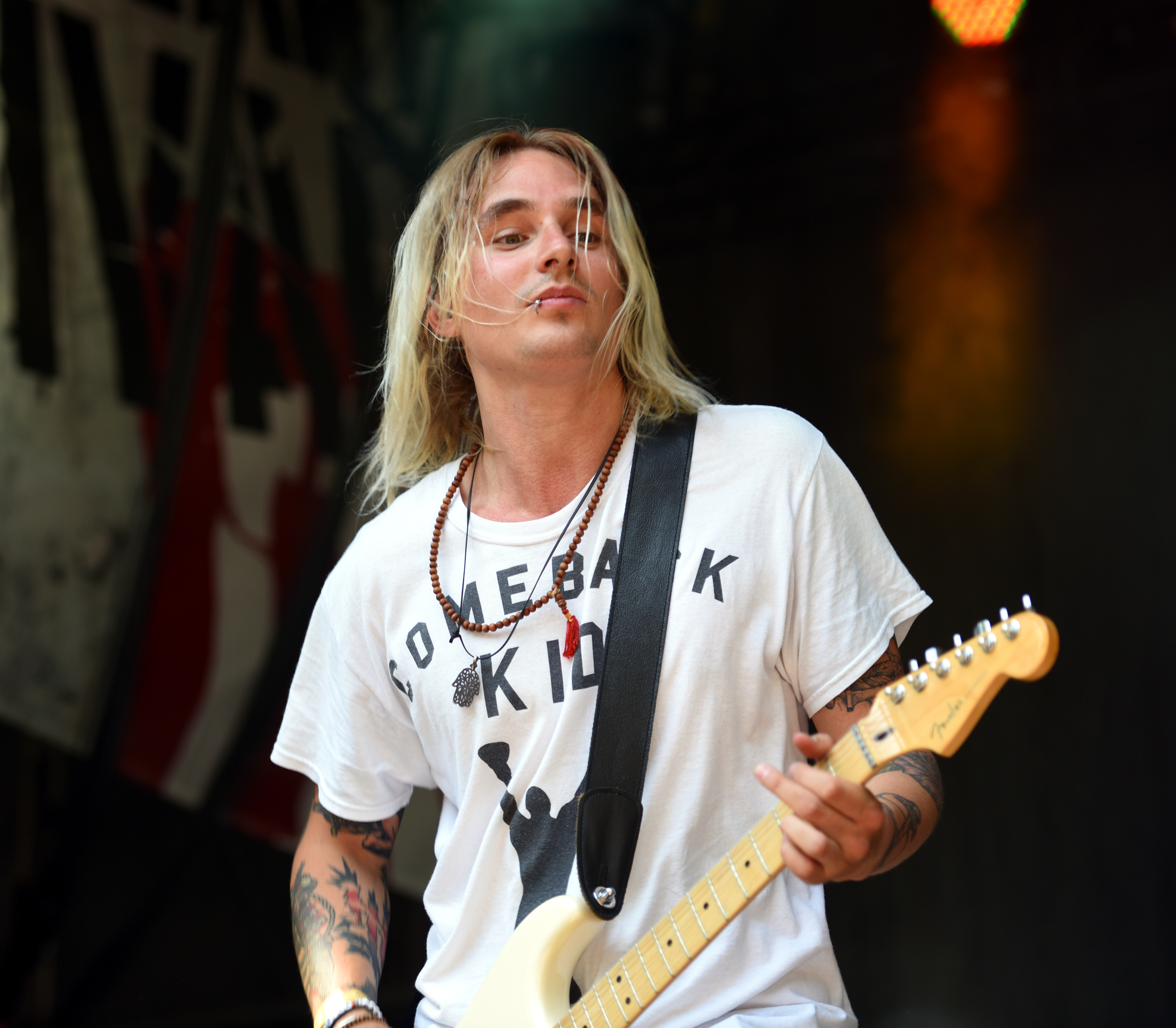
Gustav Burn

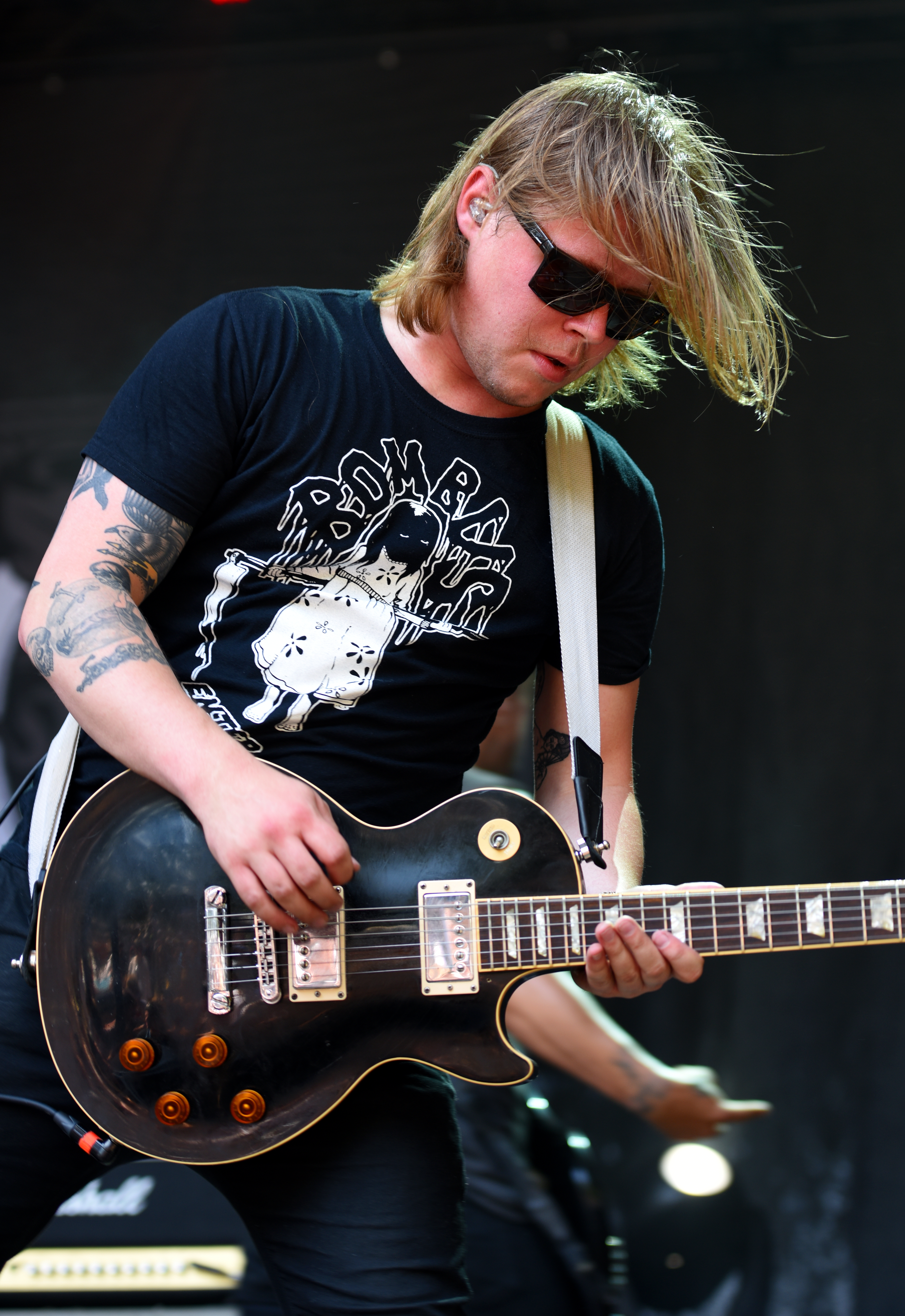
Max Huddén

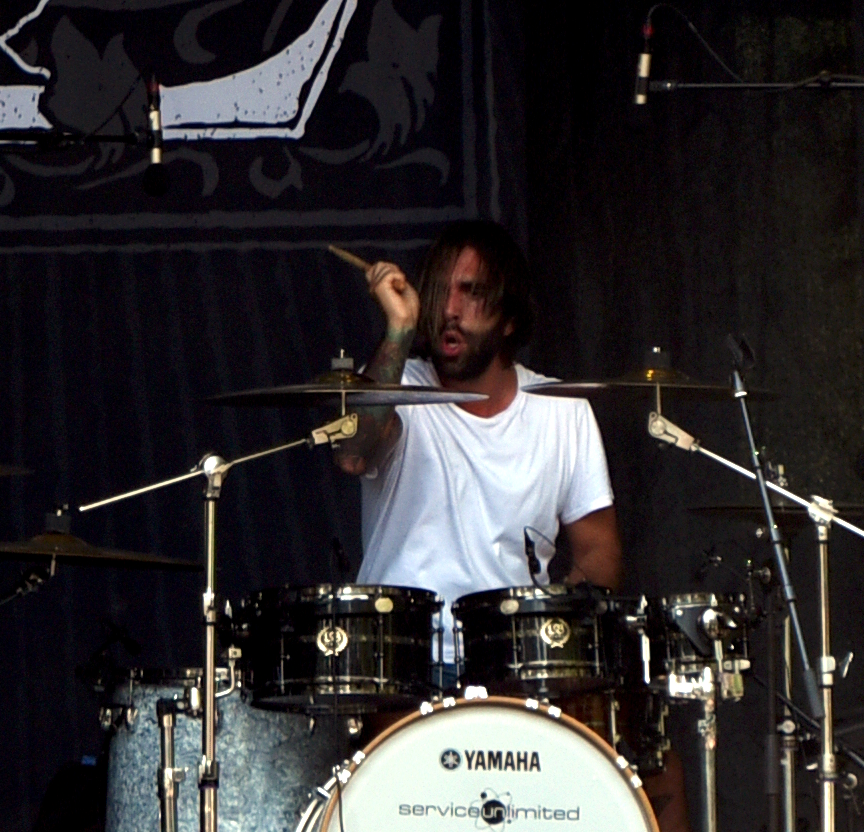
Julian Guedj

== Discography ==
- 2006 Demo
- 2007 Promo
- 2008 Shut the World Out
- 2009 Watching the Horizon
- 2011 State of Unrest
- 2015 Currents
