= Venerea =

Swedish band

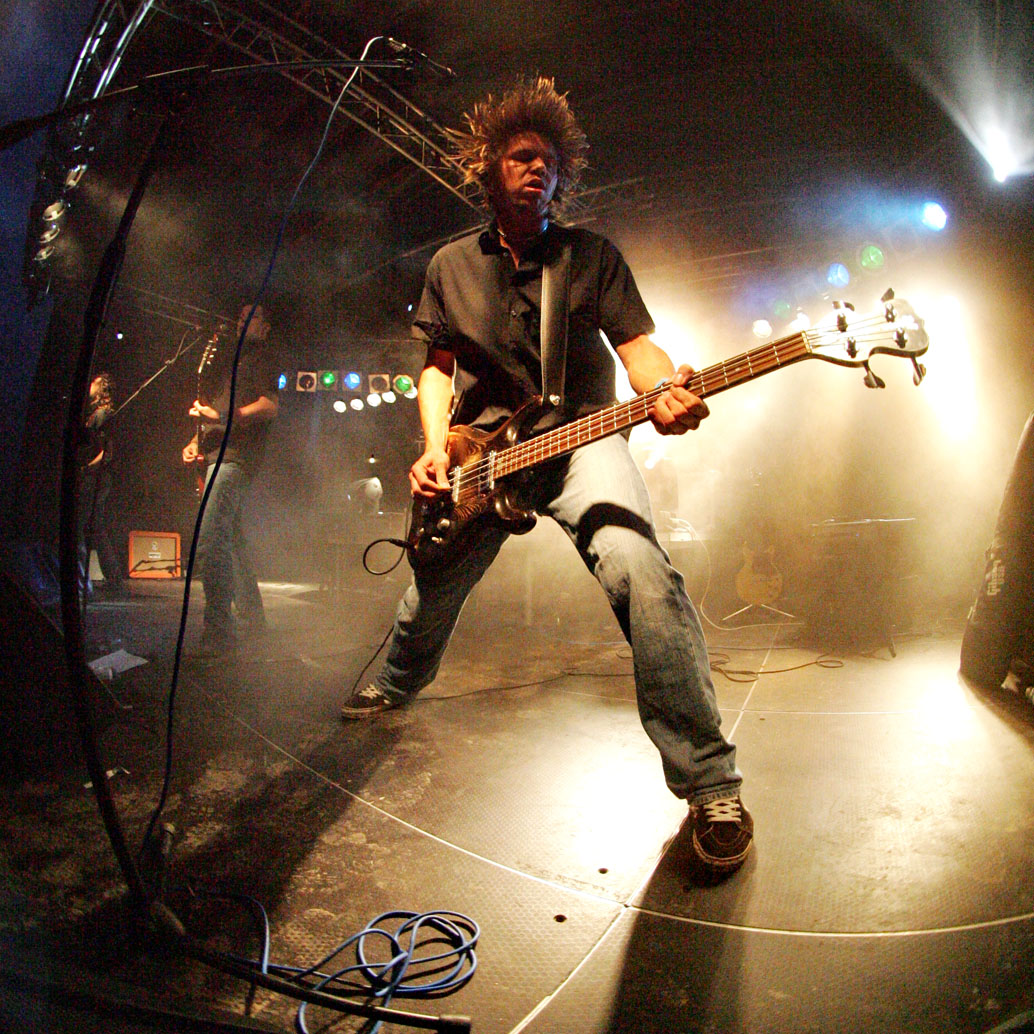
Venerea in 2007.

Venerea is a Swedish punk rock band. They have released eight albums.

The band was founded in Falkenberg in 1991.

== Discography ==
- Hullabaloo (EP, 1994)
- Shake Your Booty (EP, 1995)
- Swollen (EP, 1996)
- Both Ends Burning (1997)
- Losing Weight, Gaining Ground (2000)
- Out in the Red (2003)
- One Louder (2005)
- Black Beach Recordings (EP, 2010)
- Lean Back in Anger (2010)
- Last Call For Adderall (2016)
- The Shit Hits the Fans (2021)
- Euro Trash (2022)

== External link ==
- Discogs
