= Knockout Kid =

- Origin: Chicago, Illinois
- Genres: Pop punk, easycore
- Years active: 2010–present
- Labels: Bullet Tooth, THC Music, Ingrooves Fontana
- Members: Wade Hunt; Brompton Jackson; Bryan Nunez; John Jacobs
- Past members: Evan Franklin; Nick Collis; Justin Reinholtz; Karl Nickolov; Mike Benyoussef; Jacob Fuerst
- Website: knockoutkid.bandcamp.com

Knockout Kid is an American pop punk band from Chicago, Illinois.

== History ==
Knockout Kid formed in 2010. They signed to THC music in 2011 and released their debut EP, Your Name All Over It, the same year. In 2013, the band released their second EP, The Callback, via THC music and Ingrooves Fontana. The band released their debut full-length album, It Comes With The Job Description, the same year. In late 2013, Knockout Kid was featured on a four-way split with Traditions, No Tide, and Fourth and Goal.

In September 2015, Knockout Kid signed to Bullet Tooth Records. Their debut album on the label, Manic, was released on February 26, 2016.

In July 2020, Knockout Kid premiered the music video for Hero Insomniac, the title track off their latest album, which was self-released on July 31, 2020.

== Band members ==
Current Members

- Wade Hunt – Vocals
- Brompton Jackson – Guitar
- Bryan Nunez - Bass
- John Jacobs – Drums

Former Members

- Karl Nickolov — Guitar/vocals*
- Evan Franklin – Vocals
- Nick Collis – Bass
- Jacob Fuerst - Guitar / Vocals

Touring Members

- Alex Ceja – Bass (2016–2018)

== Discography ==
Studio albums

- Your Name All Over It (Full Length, 2010)
- It Comes with the Job Description (2013, THC Music)
- Manic (2016, Bullet Tooth)
- Hero Insomniac (2020, self-released)

EPs

- Your Name All Over It (EP, 2011, THC Music)
- The Callback (2013, THC Music and Ingrooves Fontana)

Splits

- Fourth and Goal, Traditions, No Tide, Knockout Kid - 4-way split
