= Belvedere (band) =

Canadian punk rock band

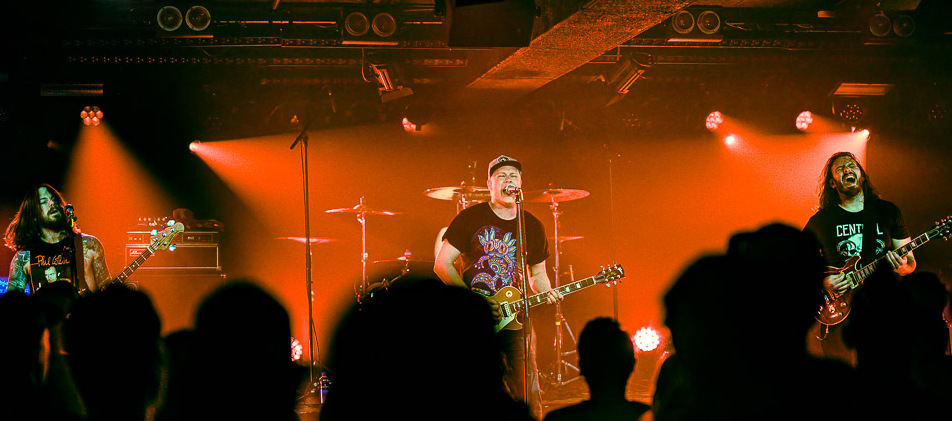
- Belvedere performing in 2025

Background information
- Origin: Calgary and Edmonton, Canada
- Genres: Skate punk, melodic hardcore, punk rock, pop punk
- Years active: 1995–2005, 2011-present
- Labels: Hourglass, 206, Jump Start, Union Label Group, Household Name, Thousand Islands, Lockjaw
- Members: Steve Rawles; Dan Wollach; Ryan Mumby; Casey Lewis
- Past members: Jason Sinclair; Scott Marshall; Jay Hollywood; Chris Foster; Brock; Graham Churchill

Belvedere is a Canadian punk rock band from Calgary and Edmonton, Canada, formed in 1995.

== History ==
=== First stint (1995–2005) ===
Belvedere's name was inspired by the American sitcom Mr. Belvedere, which ran from 1985 to 1990. The band formed in 1995 in Calgary, Alberta, Canada, starting with lead vocalist and guitarist Steve Rawles, bassist Brock, and drummer Dan Hrynuik. They eventually hired Scott Marshall as a second guitarist, Jay Hollywood as a drummer to replace Hrynuik, and Jason Sinclair as a bassist to replace Brock, soon after which they released their debut album, Because No One Stopped Us. The album came out in 1998 on Hourglass and 206 Records. In 1999, Belvedere toured with fellow melodic punk bands Bad Religion and Strung Out. In early 2000, Belvedere released their second album, Angels Live in My Town, on Jump Start Records.

Belvedere released their third album, 'Twas Hell Said Former Child, on Jump Start Records and Union 2112, Jump Start's Montreal-based imprint. At the same time, they embarked on a European tour. Shortly thereafter, they released a split with the band Downway called Hometown Advantage. The next year, 2004, they released their fourth album, Fast Forward Eats the Tape, with the aid of producer Blair Calibaba, who was also known for working with Sum 41. During the spring season of the same year, they toured with Death by Stereo, Tsunami Bomb and Misconduct.

In late 2005, Belvedere broke up. Their lineup at the time of their breakup consisted of Rawles, Marshall, Sinclair, and a new drummer Graham Churchill.

=== Reunion (2011–present) ===
During the band's temporary breakup, Rawles and Churchill formed the melodic hardcore band This Is a Standoff alongside members of fellow Canadian skate punk bands One Shot Left and Forty Cent Fix. This Is a Standoff released their second album in 2009, still during Belvedere's hiatus.

After seven years apart, Belvedere reunited for a 2012 reunion tour. These shows took place in Canada, South America, and Europe.

In November 2015, Belvedere announced that they were working on recording a new album; they also confirmed a lineup change, with Casey Lewis replacing Graham Churchill on drums due to Churchill's conflicting commitments. The band spent a year demoing the tracks before recording the new album in Casey Lewis's studio "casually [...] over all of 2015". On April 30, 2016, the band released The Revenge of the Fifth, their fifth studio album and the first since their reunion.

Sometime before 2020, Jason Sinclair and Scott Marshall departed from Belvedere; they later formed the pop punk band The Fizzgigs.

In 2021, Belvedere released their sixth studio album, Hindsight Is the Sixth Sense, with Dan Wollach and Ryan Mumby taking over guitar and bass duties, respectively.

== Musical style ==
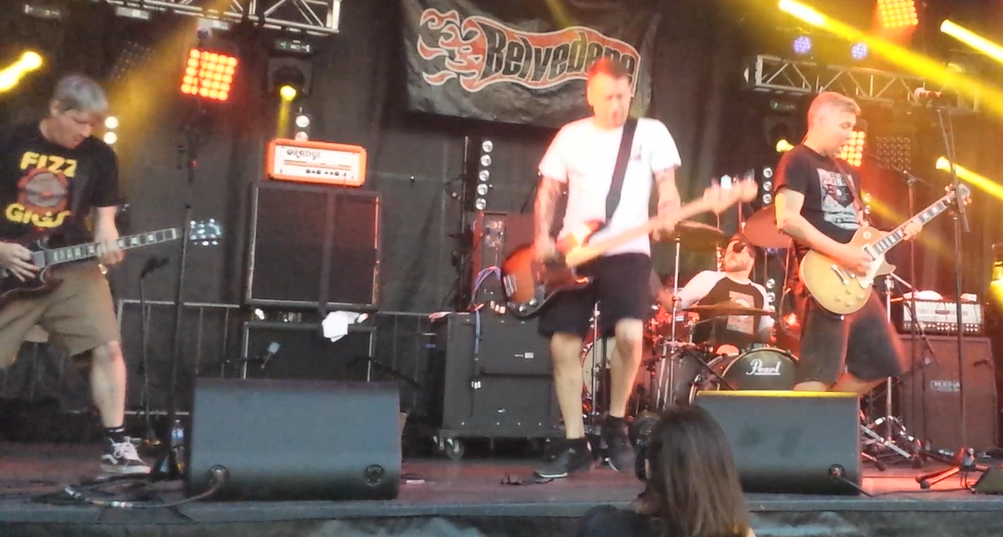
Belvedere performing in 2018

Early in Belvedere's career, AllMusic biographer Mike DaRonco categorized their music as "melodic pop-punk". Later reviewers, including Adam White from PunkNews, AllMusic's Stewart Mason, and Mark McConville from Tuned Up, categorized Belvedere's fourth album Fast Forward Eats the Tape and sixth album Hindsight Is the Sixth Sense as primarily melodic hardcore and skate punk music that integrates metallic influences and intricate guitar work uncharacteristic of punk rock's three-chord simplicity. White specifically classed Belvedere's style as "riffy, full-throttle skate punk" and acknowledged that while the band "always (much like present-day Propagandhi and Thrice) mixed their punk rock with a love of big metallic riffs," their fourth album was "the first time that aspect's seemed so well integrated and purposeful." Mason acknowledged the band's pop-punk roots in their earlier music, unfavorably comparing early Belvedere's music to Sum 41, while calling their later music "high-velocity, low-impact punk'n'roll" and stating that, by their fourth album, they had added "just a hint more metal to their sound." Mason favorably compared Belvedere's later music to "'70s pop metal" with "poppy choruses, big guitar riffs, and inescapable velocity," such as Sloan, The Sweet, and Candy.

Lyrically, Belvedere's music has addressed personal and political themes, including anti-capitalism, workers' rights, and broken relationships.

== Band members ==
Current

- Steve Rawles – vocals, guitar (1995–2005, 2011–present)
- Casey Lewis – drums (2011–present)
- Dan Wollach – guitar (2019–present)
- Ryan Mumby – bass (2019–present)

Former

- Brock – bass (1995)
- Tim Harley – bass (1995–1998)
- Dan Hrynuik – drums (1995–1998)
- Scott Marshall – guitar (1998–2005, 2011–2019)
- Jay Hollywood – drums (1998–2003)
- Jason Sinclair – bass (1998–2005, 2011–2019)
- Graham Churchill – drums (2003–2005)

== Discography ==
Studio albums

- Because No One Stopped Us (1998) Hourglass and 206 Records
- Angels Live in My Town (2000) Jump Start Records
- 'Twas Hell Said Former Child (2001) Jump Start Records and the Montreal imprint Union 2112
- Fast Forward Eats the Tape (2004)
- The Revenge of the Fifth (2016)
- Hindsight Is the Sixth Sense (2021)
- Seven Years of Bad Luck (2026)

Splits and demos

- Hometown Advantage (2003) with Downway
- All of It (2013)

== Music videos ==
- High School Heroics (1998)
- Closed Doors (2004)
- Slaves to the Pavement (2004)
- Two Minutes for Looking So Good (2004)
- Brandy Wine (2004)
- Elementally Regarded (2004)
- Hairline (2016)
