= Flatcat (band) =

Belgian DIY punk rock band

- Origin: Belgium
- Genres: Punk rock Pop punk Skate punk Alternative rock
- Years active: 1993–present

Flatcat is a Belgian DIY punk rock band. Founded by the Luyckx brothers in 1993 they have played numerous countries since then, including two Brazilian headlining tours.

== Lineup ==
- Dieter 'minx' Meyns: guitar, vocals
- Wim Luyckx: drums
- Dirk Luyckx: guitar
- Alexander Jonckheere: bass, backing vocals

== Accomplishments ==
- Did two Brazilian tours in 2001 and 2002
- Videoclip "Beautiful in Venice" aired on MTV Brazil in 2002
- Flatcat is the first band ever to sell out the Magdalenazaal (1200 p.) in Bruges, their hometown
- "Hear Tonight" Number 9 spot in "De Afrekening", Belgium's most respected alternative radio hitlist in 2004. Also included on the "De Afrekening vol. 33" chart compilation (Universal)
- Videoclip "Wait and see" gets A-rotation on TMF (MTV Belgium) in 2004
- Flatcat was on the lineup of French Alternative Festival "BetiZFest"
- Flatcat sells a performance together with Nailpin for Tsunami 1212 on JIM TV and TMF in 2005
- "Rockstar Fantasy (Break It)" in De Afrekening for no less than 13 weeks in 2005. Also included on the "De Afrekening vol. 38" chart compilation (Universal).

== Discography ==
=== Demos ===
- Demo Tape (1996, sold out)
- Punkrock RIP Promo Tape (1999)

=== Albums ===
- Four Lessons To Drive (2001, split release with Belvedere, Reset and Predial, released on Highlight Sounds, Brazil only).
- Better Luck Next Time (2002, released on Eye Spy Records in Europe and Highlight Sounds in South America).
- Flatcat/Five Days Off (2004, split release with Five Days Off, released on Eye Spy Records and Funtime Records).
- So This Is When We Grow Up (2006, released on Eye Spy Records).

=== Singles ===
- Better Luck Next Time (2002)
- Hear Tonight (2004)
- Wait And See (2004)
- Rockstar Fantasy (Break It) (2005)
- So This is When We Grow Up (2006)
- My Heart is Bulletproof (2007)
- The Great Escape (2011)
- All Anchors are Lost (ft. Sean Dhondt) (2011)

=== 7’’ ===
- Beautiful in Venice (2002)

=== Contributions ===
- 1996 Best of Belgium I (Green Leaf Records)
- 1999 Elements (Funtime Records)
- 1999 Best of Belgium II (Green Leaf Records)
- 2000 "Mr. Popular Guy" on Summer's Gone (Janez Detd single)
- 2001 Club Zed (Headcore Records – France)
- 2001 Funtime Records Sampler + Magazine
- 2001 100% Skate (Century Media – Brazil)
- 2001 Caddy of the Year (Below Par Records)
- 2002 Skateboard movie Soundtrack (Tribo Magazine Brazil – with Bob Burnquist)
- 2003 LDG Records
- 2004 De Afrekening 33
- 2004 Essentieel Belgisch (TMF Vlaanderen)
- 2005 DMAC compilation (DMAC)
- 2005 De Afrekening 38
- 2005 Airboard Movie Soundtrack (Switzerland)
