= Call It Off (band) =

Dutch pop punk band

- Origin: Eindhoven, North Brabant, Netherlands
- Genres: Pop punk
- Years active: 2013–2022, 2023–present
- Labels: White Russian Records; Sony Music
- Members: Maurice Bolier; Sergei Christian; Gio Sliwa; Timmy Steenstra Toussaint
- Past members: Adrian DeLange; Lesley Klaverdijk
- Website: www.callitoff.nl

Call It Off is a Dutch pop punk band formed in Eindhoven, Netherlands, in 2013. The band was founded by guitarist and vocalist Maurice Bolier, guitarist and vocalist Adrian DeLange, bassist Lesley Klaverdijk, and drummer Sergei Christian. Today, Bolier and Christian still play with the band, while DeLange and Klaverdijk have departed. The band has released three EPs, two albums, and eight singles.

== History ==
=== Formation, EPs, and Lovers & Liars (2013-2015) ===
Call It Off formed in Eindhoven, Netherlands in 2013. Adrian DeLange was about to go on tour with another band, but their guitarist was unable go. Having been friends with Maurice Bolier for a long time, DeLange asked Bolier to go on the tour as a stand-in. While on the tour, the two befriended the tour manager, Lesley Klaverdijk, and after hanging out many time, the three discussed the idea of starting a band. After the tour ended, they went ahead with the plan and named their band Call It Off. The group took the name from a song by American punk band, Broadway Calls. As for a drummer, Bolier was going to school at the time with Sergei Christian and asked him to be their drummer, to which he said yes.

On September 20, 2013 Call It Off released their EP, Lovers, while signed to White Russian Records. A second EP would follow on March 12, 2014 titled Liars. About a year later, the band combined the two EPs into their debut album, Lovers & Liars, and also added two new songs. The final release by the band under White Russian Records was the single, "Anesthesia", which was released on October 12, 2015.

=== Abandoned and breakup (2016-2022) ===
In March 2016, Call It Off had planned to make another release, but they held back on the release, due to signing with Sony Music for their next album. The band announced that they made this deal on April 21, 2016. The previously cancelled single, "Abandoned", was then released on August 26, 2016. On December 2, 2016 the band announced their second album, Abandoned, alongside the new single, "Death or Glory". Before the release of the new album, the band also released the single, "Scream Your Heart Out", on January 6, 2017. The album released on January 20, 2017, followed by a tour later that year that went from November 2, 2017 to December 23, 2017.

Following Abandoned, Call It Off released 3 singles, "Young" (2018), "Maybe I Don't Wanna Know" (2019), and "Every Little Thing" (2019).

On February 5, 2020, the band announced that they would be breaking up after one final show on May 8 that year. This show was eventually postponed to May 13, 2022 due to the COVID-19 pandemic. During that time, the band chose to return to White Russian Records to write and record their final EP, Fare Well, which released the day before this show. Three singles were released from the EP; "Go Home", "Bury The Dead", and "I Don't Wanna Miss You".

=== Reformation, lineup change, and Not Another Sad Album (2023-present) ===
On February 22, 2023, it was announced that Bolier and Christian had reformed Call It Off. The band posted a statement on their Instagram stating that DeLange and Klaverdijk had both lost their passion for the band, but had given their blessing to Bolier and Christian to continue on without them. In the place of their former bandmates, the two recruited their former touring keyboardist Gio Sliwa as a second guitarist and longtime friend Timmy Steenstra Toussaint as their new bassist. Speaking on the band's reunion Christian said that he never wanted the band to end, "but you can't do much on your own." He also said that "there's a lot of new music coming up. I've never written as much as in the last six months. And if it's up to me, we never stop!" Alongside this announcement, the band released a new single "letting go" on March 9, 2023.

Over the next two years, the band would consistently release new standalone singles, while also combining the songs into EPs when they released a new song. In February 2025, Call It Off announced their third album, Not Another Sad Album, with a release date of February 21, 2025. This was accompanied by a new song, "Generation Y," and that the band would be embarking on a supporting tour.

== Band members ==
Current members

- Maurice Bolier – guitar, vocals (2013–present)
- Sergei Christian – drums, percussion, backing vocals (2013–present)
- Gio Sliwa – guitar, backing vocals (2023–present)
- Timmy Steenstra Toussaint – bass guitar, backing vocals (2023–present)

Former members

- Adrian DeLange – guitar, vocals (2013–2022)
- Lesley Klaverdijk – bass guitar, backing vocals (2013–2022)

Timeline

== Discography ==
Year	Title	Type
2013	Lovers	EP
2014	Liars	EP
2015	Lovers & Liars	Album
2017	Abandoned	Album
2018	Young	Single
2019	Maybe I Don't Wanna Know	Single
2019	Every Little Thing	Single
2022	Fare Well	EP
2023	letting go	Single
2023	i'm done (feat. Broadway Calls)	Single
2025	Not Another Sad Album	Album
