= Funeral for a Friend discography =

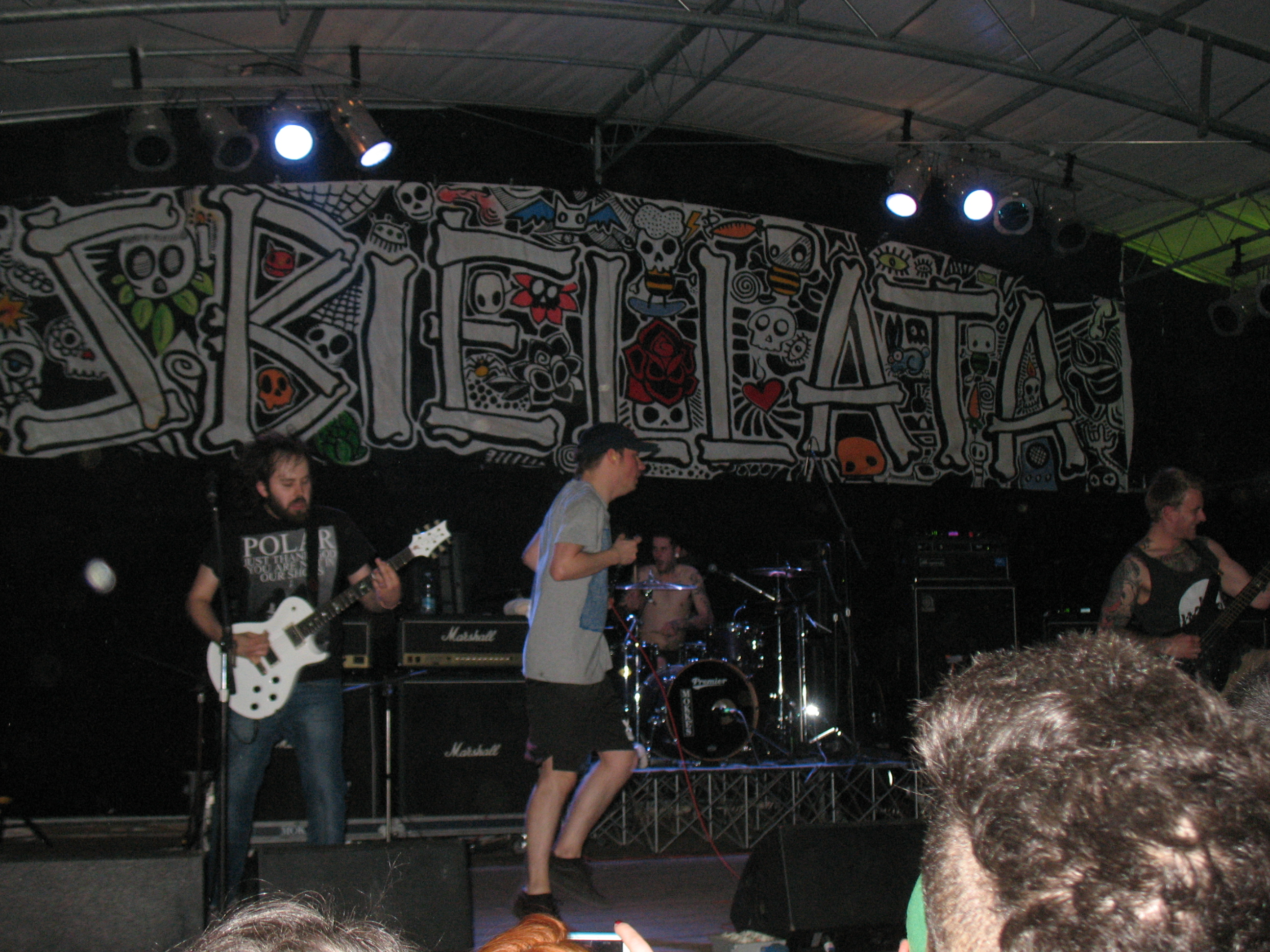
- Funeral for a Friend performing in 2013
- Studio albums: 7
- Extended plays: 7
- Live albums: 2
- Compilation albums: 2
- Singles: 18
- B-sides: 9
- Video albums: 2
- Music videos: 30

The discography of Funeral for a Friend consists of seven albums, seven EPs, eighteen singles, two DVDs and numerous compilation appearances.

== Albums ==
=== Studio albums ===
List of albums, with selected chart positions
Title	Album details	Peak chart positions									Sales	Certifications
Title	Album details	UK	UK Rock	UK Indie	AUS	IRL	SCO	US	US Heat	US Indie	Sales	Certifications
Casually Dressed & Deep in Conversation	Released: 13 October 2003; Label: Atlantic; Format: CD, LP, digital download	12	2	—	—	—	12	—	34	26	UK: 100,000	BPI: Gold
Hours	Released: 14 June 2005; Label: Atlantic; Format: CD, LP, digital download	12	4	—	85	23	82	139	2	—	UK: 100,000	BPI: Gold
Tales Don't Tell Themselves	Released: 14 May 2007; Label: Atlantic; Format: CD, digital download	3	2	—	43	27	4	135	6	—	UK: 60,000	BPI: Silver
Memory and Humanity	Released: 13 October 2008; Label: Victory; Format: CD, LP, digital download	17	1	2	68	71	20	—	6	44		
Welcome Home Armageddon	Released: 14 March 2011; Label: Distiller; Format: CD, LP, digital download	33	2	6	98	—	37	—	39	—		
Conduit	Released: 28 January 2013; Label: Distiller; Format: CD, LP, digital download	34	2	3	—	—	50	—	—	—		
Chapter and Verse	Released: 19 January 2015; Label: Distiller; Format: CD, LP, digital download	46	5	11	—	—	57	—	—	—		
"—" denotes a title that did not chart.

=== Live albums ===
Title	Album details	Comments
Final Hours at Hammersmith	Released: 4 June 2006; Label: Atlantic Records; Format: CD, LP	Live Recording of the Hammersmith Palais Show.
Live At Shepherds Bush Empire	Released:23 July 2010; Label: Abbey Road Live Here Now; Format: CD	Live Recording of the Shepards Bush Empire Show
Hours/Live At Islington Academy	Released:12 June 2015; Label: End Hit Records; Format: CD, LP	Live Recording of the Islington Academy Show.

=== Compilation albums ===
List of albums, with selected chart positions
Title	Album details	Peak chart positions				
Title	Album details	UK	UK Down.	UK Phys.	UK Rock	SCO
Your History Is Mine: 2002-2009	Released: 14 September 2009; Label:Join Us / Atlantic Records; Format: CD, digital download	86	97	88	12	97
"—" denotes a title that did not chart.

== Extended plays ==
Title	EP details	Peak chart positions			
Title	EP details	UK	UK Indie	UK Phys.	UK Rock
Between Order and Model	Released: 12 August 2002; Label: Mighty Atom Records; Format: CD, LP	—	—	—	—
Four Ways to Scream Your Name	Released: 21 April 2003; Label: Mighty Atom Records; Format: CD, LP	—	16	—	17
Seven Ways to Scream Your Name	Released: 21 October 2003; Label: Ferret Music; Format: CD	—	—	—	—
The Great Wide Open	Released: 15 October 2007; Label: Atlantic Records; Format: CD	102	—	92	2
The Young and Defenceless	Released: 6 September 2010; Label: Pledge Music; Format: CD, 7"	—	—	—	—
See You All In Hell	Released: 7 November 2011; Label: Distiller Records; Format: CD, 7"	—	—	—	—
"—" denotes a title that did not chart.

== Singles ==
=== As lead artist ===
List of singles, with selected chart positions, showing year released and album name
Single	Year	Peak chart positions					Album
Single	Year	UK	UK Rock	UK Indie	IRL	SCO	Album
"Juneau"	2003	19	2	—	—	24	Casually Dressed & Deep in Conversation
"She Drove Me to Daytime Television"/"Bullet Theory"	2003	20	2	—	—	25	Casually Dressed & Deep in Conversation
"Escape Artists Never Die"	2004	19	5	—	—	19	Casually Dressed & Deep in Conversation
"Streetcar"	2005	15	2	—	48	—	Hours
"Monsters"	2005	36	2	—	—	36	Hours
"History"	2005	21	3	—	—	24	Hours
"Roses for the Dead"	2006	39	2	—	—	35	Hours
"Into Oblivion (Reunion)"	2007	16	2	—	—	9	Tales Don't Tell Themselves
"Walk Away"	2007	40	1	—	—	16	Tales Don't Tell Themselves
"Waterfront Dance Club"/"Beneath the Burning Tree"	2008	—	—	—	—	—	Memory and Humanity
"Kicking and Screaming"	2008	116	—	2	—	19	Memory and Humanity
"Rules and Games"	2009	—	—	—	—	—	Memory and Humanity
"Wrench"	2009	—	—	—	—	—	Your History Is Mine: 2002-2009
"Front Row Seats to the End of the World"	2011	—	—	—	—	—	Welcome Home Armageddon
"Sixteen"	2011	—	—	—	—	—	Welcome Home Armageddon
"Best Friends and Hospital Beds"	2012	—	—	—	—	—	Conduit
"The Distance"	2013	—	—	—	—	—	Conduit
"Nails"	2013	—	—	—	—	—	Conduit
"You've Got a Bad Case of the Religions"	2014	—	—	—	—	—	Chapter and Verse
"1%"	2014	—	—	—	—	—	Chapter and Verse
"Pencil Pusher"	2015	—	—	—	—	—	Chapter and Verse
"—" denotes a title that did not chart, or was not released in that territory.

=== Split singles ===
List of split singles, showing year released, track titles, other artist and notes
Title	Year	Tracks	Other artist(s)	Notes
Funeral for a Friend / Moments in Grace	2004	"Bullet Theory" / "My Dying Day"	Moments in Grace	Label: Atlantic, Salad Days Records; 7" Clear vinyl
Funeral for a Friend / BoySetsFire	2014	"10:45 Amsterdam Conversations" / "Rookie"	BoySetsFire	Label: End Hits Records; 7" various coloured vinyl

=== Promotional singles ===
List of promotional singles, showing year released and album name
Title	Year	Album
"The Art of American Football"	2002	Non-album single
"Bullet Theory"	2003	Casually Dressed & Deep in Conversation
"You Want Romance?"	2005	Non-album singles
"A Manor of Sleep"	2007	Non-album singles
"Broken Foundation"	2011	Welcome Home Armageddon
"High Castles"	2011	See You All In Hell
"—" denotes a recording that did not chart or was not released in that territory.

== B-sides ==
B-Side	Single/Ep/Album
"Getaway Plan"	Juneau Pt.1 Single
"Kiss & Make Up (All Bets Are Off)"	Juneau Pt.1 Single
"You Want Romance?"	Escape Artists Never Die Single
"10 Scene Points To The Winner"	Escape Artists Never Die Single
"Bullet Theory (Clean Version)"	She Drove Me To Daytime Television/Bullet Theory Pt.1 Single
"The System [Zane Lowe Radio One Session]"	She Drove Me To Daytime Television/Bullet Theory Pt.1 Single
"Lazarus (In the Wilderness)"	Streetcar Pt.1 Single
"I Am the Arsonist"	Streetcar Pt.2 Single
"This Letter"	Streetcar Single [7" Vinyl]
"Babylon's Burning"	Monsters Pt.1 Single
"Sunday Bloody Sunday"	Monsters Pt.1 Single
"The Boys Are Back in Town"	Monsters Pt.2 Single
"Monsters (Jagz Kooner Remix)"	Monsters Pt.2 Single
"Pirate Song"	History Single
"History (Video Mix)"	History Pt.1 Single [7" Vinyl]
"Drive (Tiscali Session Version)"	History Pt.1 Single [7" Vinyl]
"The Art Of American Football (Tiscali Session Version)	History Pt.2 Single [7" Vinyl]
"Rise and Fall"	Into Oblivion (Reunion) Single
"Out Of Reach (Demo)"	Into Oblivion (Reunion) Single [7" Vinyl]
"Crash and Burn (Demo)"	Into Oblivion (Reunion) Single [7" Picture Disc]
"In A Manner Of Sleep (Home Demo)"	Walk Away Single
"Into Oblivion (Reunion) (Haunts Remix)"	Walk Away Single [7" Vinyl]
"Africa (Home Demo)"	Walk Away Single [7" Picture Disc]
"Faster"	Kicking and Screaming Single
"Join Us"	Kicking and Screaming Single
"Kicking and Screaming (Demo)"	Kicking and Screaming Single
"Kicking and Screaming (Ghostlines Remix)"	Kicking and Screaming Single
"Kicking and Screaming (Unplugged)"	Kicking and Screaming Single
"Kicking and Screaming Live"	Rules and Games Single
"Rules and Games (Demo)"	Rules and Games Single
"Sixteen (Dave Bascombe Mix)"	Sixteen Promo
"Owls (Are Watching) Demo"	Sixteen Promo
"Miracle Of Christmas"	The Ice Harvest (Soundtrack); Taste Of Christmas
"Green to Me" (Hum cover)	Songs of Farewell and Departure: A Tribute To HUM
"I Can Climb Mountains" (Hell Is For Heroes cover)	Rock Sound: Worship And Tributes

== Videography ==
=== DVDs ===
Release date	Title	Label
20 September 2004	Spilling Blood in 8 mm	Mighty Atom Records
10 April 2012	Casually Dressed and Deep in Conversation: Live and in Full at Shepherds Bush Empire	

While not all of these songs were released as singles, promotional videos were filmed for them and shown in the UK.

=== Music videos ===
- "The Art of American Football"
- "10.45 Amsterdam Conversations"
- "This Year's Most Open Heartbreak"
- "Juneau"
- "She Drove Me to Daytime Television"
- "Bullet Theory"
- "Escape Artists Never Die"
- "You Want Romance?"
- "Juneau (Acoustic)"
- "Streetcar"
- "Monsters"
- "History"
- "Roses for the Dead"
- "Into Oblivion (Reunion)"
- "Walk Away"
- "The Great Wide Open"
- "Waterfront Dance Club"
- "Beneath the Burning Tree"
- "Kicking and Screaming"
- "Rules and Games"
- "Wrench"
- "Serpents In Solitude"
- "Front Row Seats to the End of the World"
- "Sixteen"
- "Broken Foundation"
- "Spinning Over the Island"
- "Best Friends & Hospital Beds"
- "The Distance"
- "Nails"
- "1%"
- "Pencil Pusher"
- "Streetcar (Hours / Live At Islington Academy DVD)"
