= Your History Is Mine: 2002–2009 =

Compilation album by Funeral for a Friend
- Released: 28 September 2009
- Recorded: 2002–2009 (see below)
- Genre: Post-hardcore, alternative rock, emo, screamo, melodic hardcore
- Length: 133:32
- Label: Atlantic
- Producer: Various

Funeral for a Friend chronology
Memory and Humanity (2008)	Your History Is Mine: 2002–2009 (2009)	The Young & Defenceless (2010)

Singles from Your History Is Mine
- 1. "Wrench" Released: 14 September 2009

Professional ratings
Review scores
Source	Rating
In the News	(8/10)
Classic Rock	6/10 stars
Kerrang!	4/5 stars
NME	(7/10)
Rock Sound	(8/10)

Your History is Mine: 2002–2009 is a double-disc compilation album by Welsh rock band Funeral for a Friend, released on 28 September 2009 on Atlantic Records.

The collection includes tracks from the band's two EPs and four studio albums, as well as covers, B-sides and four newly recorded tracks. It reached #86 in the UK chart. It is the band's first full-length CD to not be released in the United States.

The Limited 3CD Digital Release (which is now out of print) included a large amount of demos from the band's archives, including the previously unreleased song "Colossus", the electric demo of "This Letter", and "Summer's Dead And Buried" (one of the band's earliest songs that was rewritten to become "Waking Up").

== Track listing ==
All lyrics written by Matthew Davies-Kreye; music composed by Funeral for a Friend, except where noted.

Disc One
No.	Title	Length
1.	"10:45 Amsterdam Conversations"	3:41
2.	"This Year's Most Open Heartbreak"	2:43
3.	"Juneau"	3:36
4.	"She Drove Me to Daytime Television"	3:35
5.	"Escape Artists Never Die"	5:18
6.	"Red Is the New Black"	5:14
7.	"Streetcar"	3:39
8.	"Roses for the Dead"	4:06
9.	"History"	4:08
10.	"Into Oblivion (Reunion)"	4:23
11.	"Walk Away"	3:48
12.	"Kicking and Screaming"	3:23
13.	"No Honour Among Thieves"	2:45
14.	"Built to Last"	4:20
15.	"Wrench"	2:30
16.	"Captains of Industry"	3:43

Track 1 from the Between Order and Model EP. Track 2 from the Four Ways to Scream Your Name EP. Track 3–6 from Casually Dressed & Deep in Conversation. Tracks 7–9 from Hours. Tracks 10–11 from Tales Don't Tell Themselves. Track 12 from Memory and Humanity. Tracks 13–16 previously unreleased.

iTunes bonus tracks
No.	Title	Length
17.	"The End of Nothing" (Demo)	3:11
18.	"Roses for the Dead" (Demo)	4:03
19.	"She Drove Me to Daytime Television" (Demo)	3:34
20.	"Walk Away" (Demo)	3:46

Free download through FFAF's MySpace page
No.	Title	Length
17.	"All the Rage" (Demo)	3:34

Disc Two
No.	Title	Length
1.	"Getaway Plan"	4:14
2.	"The System" (Jonah Matranga, Shaun Lopez)	2:06
3.	"You Want Romance?"	2:51
4.	"10 Scene Points to the Winner"	2:39
5.	"Lazarus (In the Wilderness)"	2:50
6.	"I Am the Arsonist"	4:50
7.	"This Letter"	3:17
8.	"Babylon's Burning" (Paul Fox, Gary Barnacle)	2:32
9.	"Sunday Bloody Sunday" (Bono, The Edge, Adam Clayton, Larry Mullen Jr.)	4:25
10.	"The Boys Are Back in Town" (Phil Lynott)	4:20
11.	"Pirate Song" (Gameface Cover)	3:45
12.	"Rise and Fall"	3:28
13.	"Crash and Burn"	3:53
14.	"In a Manner of Sleep"	4:29
15.	"Africa"	3:30
16.	"Faster"	3:54
17.	"Join Us"	3:47
18.	"Drive" (Tiscali acoustic session)	4:32
19.	"The Art of American Football" (Tiscali acoustic session)	3:06
20.	"Into Oblivion (Reunion)" (Haunts remix)	4:55

Disc Three (Digital Only)
No.	Title	Length
1.	"Streetcar" (Demo)	3:25
2.	"Hospitality" (Demo)	5:15
3.	"Roses for the Dead" (Demo)	4:03
4.	"All the Rage" (Demo)	3:34
5.	"This Letter" (Demo)	4:35
6.	"The End of Nothing" (Demo)	3:11
7.	"Summers Dead & Buried" (Demo)	3:50
8.	"She Drove Me to Daytime Television" (Demo)	3:34
9.	"Storytelling" (Demo)	3:28
10.	"Alvarez" (Demo)	4:19
11.	"Moment Forever Faded" (Demo)	4:13
12.	"Bend Your Arms to Look Like Wings" (Demo)	4:06
13.	"Walk Away" (Demo)	3:46
14.	"The Rise and Fall" (Demo)	3:38
15.	"Bird on a Wire" (Demo)	3:37
16.	"Colossus" (Demo)	3:20
17.	"The Reunion" (Demo)	4:53

== Personnel ==
The following personnel contributed to Your History Is Mine: 2002-2009:

=== Funeral for a Friend ===
- Matthew Davies-Kreye – lead vocals (all tracks)
- Kris Coombs-Roberts – guitar (all tracks)
- Darran Smith – guitar (all tracks)
- Gavin Burrough – bass guitar, vocals (disc one, tracks 13–16)
- Ryan Richards – drums, unclean vocals (all except disc one, track 1), keyboards (disc one, track 12)
- Gareth Ellis-Davies – bass guitar, vocals (all except disc one, tracks 1 and 13–16)
- Matthew Evans – screamed vocals (disc one, track 1)
- Andi Morris – bass guitar (disc one, track 1)
- Johnny Phillips – drums (disc one, track 1)

=== Additional musicians ===
- Alwyn Davies – additional backing vocals (disc one, track 1)
- Kate Hamiltion – phone voice (disc one, track 7)
- Storme, Lisa, Joel De'ath – additional vocals (disc one, track 7)
- Brian Valentino, Josh Evans – additional vocals (disc one, track 9)
- Luis Jardim – tambourine and shaker (disc one, tracks 10–11)
- Audrey Riley – orchestra and choir arrangements, conductor (disc one, track 10)
- Robert Salter (leader), Boguslav Kostecki, Claire Thompson, Joan Atherton, Liz Partridge, Emma Welton – violin 1 (disc one, track 10)
- Laura Melhuish, Kathy Shave, Jayne Harris, Fenella Barton, Juliet Snell, Ann Morfee – violin 2 (disc one, track 10)
- Sue Dench, Peter Lale, Jane Atkins, Peter Collyer – viola (disc one, track 10)
- Ann Lines, Andrew Fuller, Nick Cooper, Harry Napier – cello (disc one, track 10)
- Corin Long, Elizabeth Bradley – double bass (disc one, track 10)
- Michael Haslam (leader), Helen Rathbone, Amanda Morrison, Jacqueline Barron, Clare Henry, Heather Cairncross, Andrew Butler, Gerard O'Beirne – synergy vocals (disc one, track 10)

=== Production ===
- Produced by Joe Gibb (disc one, track 1), Colin Richardson (disc one, tracks 2–6), Terry Date (disc one, tracks 7–9), Gil Norton (disc one, tracks 10–11) and Romesh Dodangoda (disc one, track 12) with Funeral for a Friend
- Mixed by the above, except disc one tracks 10–11, mixed by Dave Bascombe
- Engineered by Roger Hopkins, Alwyn Davies (disc one, track 1), Colin Richardson, Will Bartle (disc one, tracks 2–6), Matt Hyde, Richard Woodcraft (disc one, tracks 3–6), Terry Date, Sam Hofstedt, Floyd Reitsma, Brian Valentino, paul william mercer guitars (disc one, tracks 7–9), Adrian Bushby, Helen Atkinson, John Dunne, Steve Price, Matt Bartran (disc one, tracks 10–11), Romesh Dodangoda and Rob Thomas (disc one, track 12)
- Mastered by Tom Baker (disc one, track 2), Howie Weinberg (disc one, tracks 3–6), Ted Jensen (disc one, tracks 7–9 and 12) and Dick Beetham (disc one, tracks 10–11)
- Recorded at Mighty Atom Studios, Swansea (disc one, track 1), Chapel Studios, Lincolnshire (disc one, tracks 2–6), RAK Studios and Miloco Studios (disc one, tracks 3–6), Studio X and Studio Litho, Seattle (disc one, tracks 7–9), Outhouse Studios, Reading (phone voice, disc one track 7) and Long Wave Studio, Cardiff (disc one, track 12)
