= Escape Artists Never Die =

Single by Funeral for a Friend

from the album Casually Dressed & Deep in Conversation
- Released: 2 February 2004
- Recorded: 2003
- Genre: Emo, post-hardcore
- Length: 3:40 (Edited) 5:17 (Album Version)
- Label: Mighty Atom
- Songwriter(s): Kris Coombs, Gareth Ellis-Davies, Matthew Davies-Kreye, Ryan Richards, Darran Smith
- Producer(s): Colin Richardson and Funeral for a Friend

Funeral for a Friend singles chronology
| "She Drove Me to Daytime Television" (2003) | "Escape Artists Never Die" (2004) | "Streetcar" (2005) |

"Escape Artists Never Die" is the third and last single from Funeral for a Friend's Casually Dressed & Deep in Conversation album. This single marked the first use of the DVD format for the band's singles; second being for the very-sought-after "Monsters" DVD single. It charted at the 19th position on the UK Singles Chart, just like their previous release, "Juneau". The song was originally included on the band's second EP, Four Ways to Scream Your Name and was remixed for the album before being released as a single.

The two B-Sides "You Want Romance?" and "10 Scene Points To The Winner" were brand new recordings at the time, and are noted for being some of the heaviest songs the band ever recorded.

== Release ==
The single's B-side "You Want Romance" was first released as a download-only single on 15 January 2004, along with its music video. The single's cover art was originally used on the download single and refers to "You Want Romance's" opening lines of "The water's colder at the edge".

The "Escape Artists Never Die" single was released on 2 February 2004, on CD, DVD and 7" Vinyl.

== Music video ==
The music video shows two dancers dancing in front of the band performing in a big room. The male dancer is Craig Scott, a dancer and Musical Theatre performer, currently in the West End production of Joseph and the Amazing Technicolour Dreamcoat.

== Track listing ==
=== Digital release ===
1. You Want Romance?
2. You Want Romance? (Music Video)

=== CD ===
1. Escape Artists Never Die (Short Version)
2. You Want Romance?
3. 10 Scene Points To The Winner
4. You Want Romance? (Music Video)
5. Escape Artists Never Die (Music Video)

=== DVD ===
1. Escape Artists Never Die
2. Escape Artists Never Die (Music Video)
3. Moments Forever Faded (Live Video)
4. Rookie Of The Year (Live Video Clip)

=== 7" Vinyl ===
1. Escape Artists Never Die
2. You Want Romance?
