= Liberty 37 =

Welsh brand

- Liberty 37 performing at the Reading & Leeds festival in 1999

Background information
- Origin: Swansea, Wales, UK
- Genres: Indie rock Hard rock
- Years active: 1998–2002
- Labels: Beggars Banquet Records; Mighty Atom Records; Organ
- Members: Ishmael Lewis; Andrew "Twink" Watkins; Cliff Harris; Tim Batcup
- Past members: Simeon Betteridge; Rhodri Thomas

Liberty 37 were a four-piece band, hailing from Swansea, Wales. The band started out with the name Travis, but were forced to change it when another band with the same name became successful. After changing names from Travis Inc. and Applecore (this came too close to the Beatles' Apple Corp organisation) the band settled on Liberty 37.

Travis Inc made enough of an impression during their brief incarnation to feature as "ones to watch" in Kerrang!'s Class Of 1998 feature, where they were described as "Soaring, uplifting, but still bruising - Radiohead gone hardcore." That snap assessment was a neat encapsulation of Liberty 37's strength - an ability to pile up intense layers of guitars without sacrificing melody or obliterating delicate shades of feeling. The band first demonstrated the trick on vinyl for Org Records release on their debut single - "No Beauty", a record which won them more friends and clinched their deal with Beggars Banquet. Their debut record for Beggars was the Stuffed EP, released in May 1998, which saw them "sending waves of emotion crashing against solid, abrasive guitars" (Kerrang !). A UK tour with Bullyrag saw Liberty 37 spread the word around the country for the first time.

Liberty 37 were included in Rock Sound's critic's poll of the top 50 albums of 1999 for The Greatest Gift and again in 2001 for God Machine.

== History ==
1999 proved to be most eventful for the band. They released "Revolution" in January and then the action came thick and fast. Liberty 37 joined Pulkas and One Minute Silence on a 22 date tour of the UK in February. They finished recording their debut album. They lost one drummer, borrowed another, and finally found a third one to join them full-time. And in May of that year, they released "Oh River", which was playlisted by MTV in the UK, following it up with another jaunt round the UK in the company of A (band) on an 18 date UK tour. The band finished up playing at the Reading / Leeds festival in August.

In contrast to 1999, the year 2000 proved to be a most frustrating year. Following the release of the Revolution CD single in February and a mini tour of the UK in March and April the band started writing material for the follow-up album to The Greatest Gift during the summer of 2000. However, the band hit a number of setbacks during the remainder of the year. First drummer Cliff broke his arm playing 5-a-side football, only to be emulated by guitarist Tim also playing football. Finally, the band were set to go into the studio at the end of the year to record demos for the album.

The demos were completed in early February and mixed in March, and duly sent to Beggars Banquet. Due in part to the long lay-off since the last release, and a change in direction by Beggars, the label decided not to proceed with the album.

Many bands could have given up at this point, but not Liberty 37. With Beggars out of the picture Mighty Atom were quick to step in and offer the band a new deal kicking off with the new album, now with a working title God Machine. The band signed up and the album moved onto mixing. The label drafted in Joe Gibb (Funeral For A Friend, Million Dead) who took the demo mixes to a new level as well as recording two new tracks. When finally completed all were agreed that the album surpassed the impressive debut The Greatest Gift.

God Machine was released on 29 October 2001 to much critical acclaim including Album of the Month in Rocksound and 4K in Kerrang!

"enough power, passion and pride exhibited here to last Puddle Of Mudd their entire career" - Kerrang!

"Liberty 37 piss over so many mediocre acts of the same ilk currently selling millions of albums, and they're for real. Take your time to discover, and enjoy for years to come!" - Rocksound

"It's a testament to the quality of the material that none of the songs stand out - all are worth hearing." - Metal Hammer

The band embarked on a heavy touring schedule to support the album including a headline tour with stable mates Goatboy. In the end the heavy touring schedule and differences in the band all took their toll and the band decided to call it a day as they were starting pre-production on their third album.

=== Other projects ===
Ishmael has contributed vocals to the Standing Dead Centre side project, with Owen Packward, Richie Mills and Dave Anderson of earthtone9

== Discography ==
=== Albums ===
- The Greatest Gift - 1999 - Beggars Banquet Records
- God Machine - 2001 - Mighty Atom Records

=== EPs ===
- Stuffed EP - 1998 - Beggars Banquet Records
- Oh River EP - 1999 - Beggars Banquet Records

=== Singles ===
- "No Beauty" - 1998 - Organ (magazine) Records
- "Oh River" - 1999 - Beggars Banquet Records
- "Revolution" - 1999 - Beggars Banquet Records
- "When We Say" - 1999 - Beggars Banquet Records

=== Appearances on compilations ===
Information
Abuse Fanzine - Abuse Your Friends vol. 1
- Released: 1997
- Featured song: "Stuffed" (as Applecore)

Abuse Fanzine

Organ Radio 1 - organ025
- Released: 1997
- Featured songs: "No Beauty", "Take It Like A Man", "Need It" (as Travic Inc)

Organ Records

Organ Radio 2 - organ031
- Released: 1997
- Featured song: "1969" (As Applecore)

Organ Records

The Circle EP / Organ Radio 3 - Sharks In The Ugly Pool Suzie Get Out
- Released: November 1998
- Featured song: "Letter From Ten Years Ago"

Organ Records

Hammered Vol 6
- Released: 1999
- Featured song: "Oh River"

Free with Metal Hammer magazine

Music With Attitude Volume 6
- Released: 1999
- Featured song: "Seize The Day"

Free with Metal Hammer magazine

New Voices Vol. 31
- Released: 1999
- Featured song: "Revolution"

Rolling Stone (Germany)

Rock Sound vol.35
- Released: 1999
- Featured song: "Oh River"

Free with Rock Sound magazine

Spirit Of Independence
- Released: 1999
- Featured song: "Stuffed"

Free with Kerrang! magazine

Metal Hammer - Noise Inc. Volume 3
- Released: 2000
- Featured song: "Pig"

Free with Metal Hammer magazine

Music With Attitude - Volume 31
- Released: 2001
- Featured song: "Stanislaw"

Free with Rock Sound magazine

== Band name ==
The band took their name from the film China 9, Liberty 37, wherein at the start of the film, the protagonist passes a signpost with these directions on.
