= Chapter and Verse (Funeral for a Friend album) =

Studio album by Funeral for a Friend
- Released: 19 January 2015
- Genre: Post-hardcore, melodic hardcore
- Length: 38:35
- Label: Distiller Records
- Producer: Lewis Johns

Funeral for a Friend chronology
Conduit (2013)	Chapter and Verse (2015)	Hours – Live at Islington Academy (2015)

Singles from Chapter and Verse
- 1. "You've Got a Bad Case of the Religions" Released: 28 September 2014; 2. "1%"; 3. "Pencil Pusher"

Chapter and Verse is the seventh full-length album by British post-hardcore band Funeral for a Friend, released on 19 January 2015. This is the first album released by Funeral for a Friend since 2007's Tales Don't Tell Themselves not to be produced by Romesh Dodangoda, who had produced the band's last three albums starting with 2008's Memory and Humanity.

== Release and promotion ==
On their 2014 tour, Funeral for a Friend incorporated the song "1%" into their set list. The band then debuted the first single from the album, "You've Got a Bad Case of the Religions", on the Rock Show on BBC Radio 1 on 28 September 2014. They announced the title of the album, as well as its release date and a 2015 tour in support of the album the next day.

Chapter and Verse would become the band's final album during their initial run as a band, as they confirmed on 14 September 2015 that they would be breaking up following a final tour in 2016. However, following a string of reunion shows between 2019 and 2023, it was announced that the band would be writing new music, albeit without vocalist Matthew Davies-Kreye who decided to part ways with the band.

== Track listing ==
No.	Title	Length
1.	"Stand by Me for the Millionth Time"	3:54
2.	"You've Got a Bad Case of the Religions"	2:39
3.	"Pencil Pusher"	3:00
4.	"You Should Be Ashamed of Yourself"	3:48
5.	"1%"	3:44
6.	"After All These Years…Like a Lightbulb Going Off in my Head"	3:33
7.	"Modern Excuse of a Man"	1:48
8.	"Inequality"	2:54
9.	"Brother"	1:52
10.	"Donny"	2:43
11.	"The Jade Tree Years Were My Best"	8:40
Total length:		38:35

ITunes bonus tracks
No.	Title	Length
12.	"Hidden Track"	3:06
13.	"1% (Acoustic)"	3:44
14.	"Inequality (Acoustic)"	2:52
15.	"You've Got a Bad Case of the Religions (Acoustic)"	2:52
Total length:		51:09

Japanese bonus tracks
No.	Title	Length
12.	"Rookie (boysetsfire cover)"

== Recording personnel ==
Funeral for a Friend

- Matthew Davies – lead vocals
- Kris Coombs-Roberts – guitar, backing vocals
- Gavin Burrough – guitar, backing vocals
- Pat Lundy – drums, percussion
- Richard Boucher – bass guitar

Lewis Johns – Producer
