= She Drove Me to Daytime Television/Bullet Theory =

"She Drove Me to Daytime Television/ Bullet Theory"

Single by Funeral for a Friend

from the album Casually Dressed & Deep in Conversation
- Released: 15 September 2003 (Digital Release) / 6 October 2003 (Physical Release)
- Genre: Post-hardcore, screamo
- Length: 3:34
- Label: Mighty Atom
- Songwriter(s): Funeral for a Friend
- Producer(s): Colin Richardson and Funeral for a Friend

Funeral for a Friend singles chronology
"Juneau" (2003)	"She Drove Me to Daytime Television" / "Bullet Theory" (2003)	"Escape Artists Never Die" (2004)

"She Drove Me to Daytime Television" is a song by Welsh post-hardcore band Funeral for a Friend. It was originally released on the band's EP Four Ways to Scream Your Name. The song also appeared on FFAF's debut LP, Casually Dressed & Deep in Conversation.

"She Drove Me to Daytime TV" was then released as a "double A-side" on the 6 October 2003; its sister release was "Bullet Theory". It reached #20 in the UK Singles Chart.

The promotional video showed the band playing normally with frequent X-ray-like views of the band members as the camera "flies" through them. Whereas the promotional video for “Bullet Theory”, whose lyrics are about the assassination of John F. Kennedy, introduced the faceless characters who are digging in the sand on a beach looking for a chest with a mask/face in it.

== Track listing ==
=== Bullet Theory Digital Download ===
1. "Bullet Theory"
2. "Interview (Video)"
3. "Bullet Theory (Video)"

=== She Drove Me To Daytime Television Pt.1 ===
1. "She Drove Me To Daytime Television"
2. "Bullet Theory (Clean version)"
3. "The System (Far cover) [Live at Radio One Station]"
4. "She Drove Me To Daytime Television (Video)"

=== Bullet Theory Pt.2 ===
1. "Bullet Theory
2. "She Drove Me To Daytime Television [BBC Wales Session]"
3. "Juneau [BBC Wales Session]"
4. "Bullet Theory (Video)"

=== She Drove Me To Daytime Television/Bullet Theory 7" Vinyl ===
1. "She Drove Me To Daytime Television"
2. "Bullet Theory"

== Covers ==
English band Fightstar covered the song "She Drove Me to Daytime Television", including it as a B-Side on their Hazy Eyes single
