= Kicking and Screaming =

Kicking and Screaming may refer to:

== Film and television ==
- Kicking and Screaming (1995 film), by Noah Baumbach, starring Josh Hamilton
- Kicking & Screaming (2005 film), starring Will Ferrell
- Kicking & Screaming (TV series), a 2017 reality series from Fox

== Music ==
=== Albums ===
- Kicking & Screaming (Sebastian Bach album), (2011)
- Kickin' and Screamin', an album by rapper Krizz Kaliko

=== Songs ===
- "Kicking and Screaming" (song), a 2008 single by Funeral For A Friend
- "Kickin' and Screamin'", a song by Garth Brooks on the album In Pieces
- "Kickin' and Screamin'", a song by Marques Houston on the album Mattress Music
- Kicking & Screaming, a song by All Time Low on the album Future Hearts
- "Kicking and Screaming", a song by Ashlee Simpson on the album I Am Me, covered by Miley Cyrus for her EP The Time of Our Lives
- "Kicking and Screaming", a song by The Presets on the album Apocalypso
