= See You All in Hell =

See You All In Hell

EP by Funeral for a Friend
- Released: 7 November 2011
- Genre: Post-hardcore, melodic hardcore
- Label: Distiller Records

Funeral for a Friend chronology
Welcome Home Armageddon (2011)	See You All In Hell (2011)	Conduit (2013)

See You All In Hell is the sixth extended play by the post-hardcore band Funeral for a Friend. It was released on 7 November 2011 by Distiller Records in the United Kingdom. The first track, "High Castles", was released as a digital single on 13 October 2011. By 15 November 2011, the album had received mixed to positive reception with Kerrang! giving the album a "Good" three out of five rating.

== Release and promotion ==
The release was timed as a tie-in for the release of Welcome Home Armageddon, which was being released on vinyl. The EP was announced on 28 September 2011, Funeral for a Friend saying that it would have only one brand new track while the remainder of the tracks were acoustic renditions, live session recordings and remixes of tracks from Welcome Home Armageddon as well as a coverversion of the hardcore punk band Strife. The release of the EP was accompanied by a UK tour by the band in October 2011 as well as a digital single of "High Castles" on 13 October 2011.

== Reception ==
Professional ratings
Review scores
Source	Rating
Kerrang!	3/5 stars
Virgin Music	(6/10)
Contact Music	(Favourable)
Ourzone	(6/10)
Punknews	3.5/5 stars

The EP received positive responses from critics. Kerrang!'s writer, Alistair Lawrence, gave the album a three 'K' out of five, indicating a "Good" rating, and praised the combination of acoustic songs, a remix and a cover to prove they were still "brimming with enthusiasm and the seeds of new ideas". Chris Jefferies in an otherwise positive review of the record for Virgin Music criticised Matt Davies' vocals on the final two acoustic songs writing, "There's no question that the frontman still has the range to pull off these songs, but without the full band backing, his vocals sound strained and completely lacking of the warmth that made earlier Funeral For A Friend records so touching."

== Track listing ==
All tracks are written by Matthew Davies-Kreye, Kris Coombs-Roberts, Gavin Burrough, Richard Boucher and Ryan Richards

No.	Title	Length
1.	"High Castles"
2.	"Will to Die" (Strife cover)
3.	"Medicated" (LoveGadgetsHateGizmos remix)
4.	"Sixteen" (live at XFM)
5.	"Broken Foundation" (live at XFM)
6.	"Man Alive" (live at XFM)
7.	"Front Row Seats to the End of the World" (live at XFM)
8.	"Old Hymns" (acoustic)
9.	"Welcome Home Armageddon" (acoustic)

== Personnel ==
- Matthew Davies-Kreye – lead vocals
- Kris Coombs-Roberts – guitar
- Gavin Burrough – guitar, backing vocals
- Richard Boucher – bass guitar
- Ryan Richards – drums, unclean vocals
- Romesh Dodangoda - producer
