= Andrew Baldwin (disambiguation) =

Andrew Baldwin (born 1977) is an American naval officer and reality TV personality.

Andrew Baldwin may also refer to:

- Andrew Baldwin (baseball) (born 1982), baseball pitcher
- Andrew Baldwin, character in The 13th Man
- Andrew Baldwin, musician in Goatboy
- Andrew Baldwin, writer; see Bastille Day (2016 film)
