= Juneau (song) =

Single by Funeral for a Friend

from the album Casually Dressed and Deep in Conversation
- Released: 2003
- Recorded: 2003
- Genre: Emo
- Length: 3:37
- Label: Mighty Atom
- Songwriter: Funeral for a Friend
- Producers: Colin Richardson and Funeral for a Friend

Funeral for a Friend singles chronology
"Juneau" (2003)	"She Drove Me to Daytime Television" (2003)

"Juneau" (formerly titled "Juno") is a song by Welsh post-hardcore band Funeral for a Friend. As one of the most popular and well known of the band's songs, it was a hit single being the joint third (after "Streetcar" & "Into Oblivion (Reunion)") highest charting single to date. The song was released in two different forms on two albums; as "Juno" on the band's debut EP, Between Order and Model EP; and in its final incarnation as "Juneau" on their debut LP, Casually Dressed & Deep in Conversation.

== Juno ==
The original version of "Juneau" was titled "Juno" and was released on the band's debut EP, Between Order And Model. This version features more screamed vocals; or, in the band's preferred terminology, "aggressive vocals". Juno was recorded by the old FFAF line-up consisting of current members Matt Davies and Kris Coombs-Roberts and ex-members Darran Smith, Matthew Evans (screamed vocals), Andi Morris (bass) and Johnny Phillips (Drums). However, on the re-issue of the EP, the current line-up is credited to the recording. Juno was also included on Fierce Panda Records "Squirrel EP" released in 2003.

== Juneau ==
For their debut album, Casually Dressed and Deep in Conversation, Funeral for a Friend re-recorded the song as "Juneau" (the correct spelling for the city "Juneau" in Alaska, USA; but see contrary uses such as Juno (film)) and featuring a reduced amount of aggressive vocals and a more melodic sound. This version was recorded by the 'final' line-up of Funeral for a Friend and was the version that would become one of their most famous tracks to date, being released in both single and video forms.

=== Single ===
Released on 28 July 2003, Juneau peaked at #19 in the UK singles chart. Only "Streetcar" (#15) and "Into Oblivion (Reunion)" (#16) have reached higher in the chart, with "Escape Artists Never Die" equaling it.

=== Video ===
The video appears to take place in a cheap-looking motel. It opens with a man, presumably the proprietor of said establishment, lounging at a reception-style desk and watching porn on TV. The band is then seen walking into a large central room and beginning to play. Throughout the video, the scene changes to show: a teenage girl in her room; a man in a suit in a room containing only a box, which he eventually destroys; a man in a bathtub, sitting despondently under a running shower; and an elderly couple who sequentially sit at a table, dance, and then engage in a pillow fight. During the softer bridge section, all the characters seem to be at a turning-point, considering what to do next.

After the bridge section, once the song returns to heavier instrumentation, the people return to action, taking on more serious behaviour: the girl trashing her room, the man destroying the box, the couple having a somewhat violent (albeit still well-intentioned) pillow-fight. Eventually, the girl and man seem to make peace with themselves and their recent actions (which were perhaps therapeutically cathartic), and the elderly couple remain as happy as they have been throughout; the only ambiguity appears to be the man in the shower, whose scenes are too short and unclear to draw much of a conclusion from. The video ends with the band exiting via the same route, and the man at the front desk paying cash to lead singer Matthew Davies-Kreye.

== Track listing ==
Juneau Pt. 1

1. "Juneau"
2. "Getaway Plan"
3. "Kiss and Make Up (All Bets Are Off)" (Radio 1 Rock Show)

Juneau Pt. 2

1. "Juneau"
2. "Art of American Football" (BBC Wales Session)
3. "This Year's Most Open Heartbreak" (Radio 1 Rock Show Session version)
4. "Juneau" (Video)

Juneau 7" Vinyl

1. "Juneau"
2. "Getaway Plan"
