= Conduit (Funeral for a Friend album) =

Studio album by Funeral for a Friend
- Released: 28 January 2013
- Genre: Post-hardcore, melodic hardcore
- Length: 29:20
- Label: Distiller Records (UK); The End Records (US)
- Producer: Romesh Dodangoda

Funeral for a Friend chronology
See You All in Hell (2011)	Conduit (2013)	Chapter and Verse (2015)

Singles from Conduit
- 1. "Best Friends And Hospital Beds" Released: 12 November 2012

Conduit is the sixth studio album by Welsh post-hardcore band Funeral for a Friend. It was released on 28 January 2013 in the UK and 5 February 2013 in the United States. This is the band's first release with former Rise to Remain drummer Pat Lundy, who replaced long-term drummer and vocalist Ryan Richards during the album's production. Throughout the recording of the album the band released several teaser videos that showed the recording of individual instruments.

== Style ==
Conduit is described as being more consistently heavy than their previous releases, as they have all varied in style. Conduit is seen as the band returning to their musical roots, this is reflected in how it is some of the band's heaviest material and that raw music featured on the album captures the energy of a younger band. Much like their previous work the album is considered as post-hardcore. The album features a combination of metalcore guitar riffs, metallic breakdowns, gang vocals, 'emotionally charged hooks' and melodic choruses. Matthew Davies has summarised the record neatly by saying "it's a post-hardcore record that is not afraid to drop into some hardcore for good measure." Saying elements of it are "extremely direct and gritty".

The band's new drummer Pat Lundy has summarised the style on the record as "lot heavier and a lot more current" describing Davies' vocals as "exploring more than ever now". Davis' screaming vocals are seen as bridging the gap between his normal melodic vocals and the screamed vocals of the band's previous drummer and vocalist Ryan Richards (however, Davies previously used more conventional screamed vocals of his own prominently in some early songs by the band and as occasional elements on later albums). Lyrical themes on the album range through several topics, "from the passage of time to the power of advertising to friends dying".

The song 'The Distance' is seen as continuing the album's theme as being "a driving rocker that speaks to making a connection" and has been claimed to feature one of the album's catchiest choruses and guitar licks. 'Best Friends and Hospital Beds' lyrically focuses on death and the "futility of life". Critics have used it as an example that is designed for live shows. Tracks 'Death Comes To Us All' and 'Grey' have been compared to the "apocalyptic anthems" of their previous album Welcome Home Armageddon.

== Title and packaging ==
Conduit has been described by the other band members as about the experiences of being in a band. For the album art the band recruited Wales-based artist Snowskull, who was revealed to be Matthew Evans, who was a founding vocalist in Funeral for a Friend. Matthew Davies, the band's current vocalist, decided to contact Evans as Davies felt the inclusion of a former member was very apt. Evans also performed backing vocals on track 1, "Spine".

== Release and promotion ==
The first single released from the album was "Best Friends And Hospital Beds". Despite the song being released as a single on 12 November 2012, its music video was released a month prior on 10 October. The music video was directed by Ryan Mackfall and is set in a "bleak and derelict landscape" and has been described as a "28 Days Later style viral infection video". A second music video for 'The Distance' was released on 3 January 2013 and a typography styled video was released for the song later in the month. The band unveiled the third track from the album 'Nails' through Kerrang! magazine and then released an album sampler.

Conduit was released through Distiller Records on 28 January 2013 in the United Kingdom and 5 February 2013 through The End Records in the United States. The release was supported by an intimate 23 date tour of the United Kingdom with support from Such Gold and Major league. Those who bought a ticket for the tour also received a coupon for a reduced pricing of the album. The End Records created an exclusive packaging of the album with a second, "Live From The Roundhouse" disc to come with the album which was given away for free with all pre orders of the album.

The band also released a 'deluxe box set', which featured the album on both CD and Cassette Tape, an exclusive T-shirt, a signed poster, and a booklet containing handwritten notes on the songs from all the band members.

Two days after its release in the United Kingdom, Conduit appeared on the UK Albums Chart at 16 and ended the week at 34.

== Reception ==
Professional ratings
Aggregate scores
Source	Rating
Metacritic	(66/100)
Review scores
Source	Rating
AllMusic	3.5/5 stars
Blabbermouth.net	(7.5/10)
BBC	(Favourable)
Drowned in Sound	(6/10)
Gig Wise	(Favourable)
The Guardian	3/5 stars
NME	(4/10)
Rock Sound	(9/10)
The Shields Gazette	(6/10)
The Skinny	4/5 stars
Sputnikmusic	(3.4/5)
Virgin Media	3/5 stars

Conduit received generally positive reviews from music critics. At Metacritic, which assigns a normalised rating out of 100 to reviews from mainstream critics, the album received an average score of 66, based on 11 reviews, which indicates "generally favorable reviews". Rock Sound writer Ben Patashnik gave the album a 9 out of 10 score praising the band's youthful energy and as being "one of our most treasured bands", summarising his review with "if they can't be the biggest band in the UK any more, this album screams, they might as well go back to being one of the best." The Shields Gazette gave the album a six out of ten commenting on the raw sound of the album: "Many of the melodic touches are gone, and this is a much rawer offering, as if they were just setting out. That works well on the likes of Nails and Sun-Less, but some tracks do sound a bit samey. Not a bad album then, but not their best". Ross Watson of the Scottish publication The Skinny praised the album's "short, lean entirely engaging" punk approach.

== Track listing ==
No.	Title	Length
1.	"Spine"	2:24
2.	"Conduit"	2:19
3.	"The Distance"	2:28
4.	"Best Friends and Hospital Beds"	2:47
5.	"Nails"	2:59
6.	"Death Comes to Us All"	3:17
7.	"Travelled"	2:11
8.	"Grey"	2:15
9.	"Sun-Less"	2:30
10.	"Elements"	2:47
11.	"High Castles"	3:37
Total length:		29:20

Japanese bonus tracks
No.	Title	Length
13.	"Energy Dome" (Snapcase cover)	2:37
14.	"Bullet in the Head" (Rage Against the Machine cover)	5:11

== Music videos ==
- Best Friends and Hospital Beds (2012)
- The Distance (2013)
- Nails (2013)
- Conduit (2014)

== Recording personnel ==
Funeral For a Friend

- Matthew Davies – lead vocals
- Kris Coombs-Roberts – guitar, backing vocals
- Gavin Burrough – guitar, backing vocals
- Pat Lundy – drums, percussion
- Richard Boucher – bass guitar

Additional personnel

- Ryan Richards – drums and backing vocals on "High Castles"
- Romesh Dodangoda – production, mixing
- Jens Bogren – mastering

== Chart performance ==
Chart (2013)	Peak position
UK Albums Chart	34
UK Rock Chart	2
UK Indie Chart	2
