= The Young and Defenceless =

EP by Funeral for a Friend
- Released: September 6, 2010
- Recorded: July–August 2010 at Monnow Valley Studios, Long Wave Recording Studio, Wales
- Genre: Post-hardcore, melodic hardcore
- Length: 13:08
- Producer: Romesh Dodangoda

Funeral for a Friend chronology
Your History Is Mine: 2002–2009 (2009)	The Young and Defenceless (2010)	Welcome Home Armageddon (2011)

Professional ratings
Review scores
Source	Rating
Punktastic	4.5/5 stars
Sputnik Music	4/5 stars

The Young and Defenceless is an EP by Welsh post-hardcore band Funeral for a Friend, released on September 6, 2010. The title of the EP is sourced from a lyric in the track "Sixteen". This is the first release by Funeral for a Friend that includes bassist Richard Boucher and is also the first release to feature former bassist Gavin Burrough on guitars. The CD is limited edition, available only to those who bought it at PledgeMusic. In several European countries (not the UK), it is available for download from 7digital. On this release, the cover has been slightly changed. On October 29, 2010, the band released a music video for the song "Serpents in Solitude".

Two songs from the EP: "Sixteen" and "Damned If You Do, Dead If You Don't" were also later featured in the band's fifth full-length studio album Welcome Home Armageddon in 2011. "Sixteen," shall be the second single for their fifth studio album.

The artwork is illustrated by Rianne Rowlands

== Track listing ==
No.	Title	Length
1.	"Serpents in Solitude"	3:23
2.	"Vultures"	3:39
3.	"Damned If You Do, Dead If You Don't"	3:26
4.	"Sixteen"	2:50
Total length:		13:08

Downloadable content
No.	Title	Length
1.	"Wrench" (Demo)	2:40

== Personnel ==
- Matthew Davies-Kreye – lead vocals
- Kris Coombs-Roberts – guitar
- Gavin Burrough – guitar, backing vocals
- Richard Boucher – bass guitar
- Ryan Richards – drums, aggressive vocals
- Romesh Dodangoda - producer
- Jamie Telford, Danny Bugler & Rhodri Jones - Gang vocals on "Damned If You Do, Dead If You Don't"
