= Witness a Rebirth =

2012 album by Strife

Studio album by Strife
- Released: November 6, 2012
- Studios: Blood Tracks Studios, Los Angeles, CA; Firewater Studios, Los Angeles, CA; Mix Nova Studios, Sao Paulo, Brazil; Sunset Lodge Studios, Los Angeles, CA
- Genres: Hardcore punk, metalcore
- Length: 28:24
- Labels: 6131 Records, Holy Roar Records
- Producer: Nick Jett

Strife chronology
Angermeans (2001)	Witness a Rebirth (2012)

Professional ratings
Review scores
Source	Rating
AllMusic	3.5/5 stars
Louder Sound	3.5/5 stars

Witness a Rebirth is the fourth full-length album by the Californian hardcore band Strife. It was released in 2012, marking their first album in over a decade, since their 2001 album Angermeans.

== Background ==
The band traveled to Brazil to record the album. Guitarist Andrew Kline commented the album would be "more along the lines of In This Defiance". It was also revealed that Igor Cavalera, formerly of Sepultura and Cavalera Conspiracy, would be handling all drum duties for the album. Also contributing to the album were members of fellow Californian hardcore band Terror.

== Track listing ==
All lyrics are written by Rick Rodney; all music is composed by Andrew Kline, except where noted.

No.	Title	Music	Length
1.	"Torn Apart"		1:55
2.	"Carry the Torch"		2:52
3.	"Show No Mercy"		2:33
4.	"No Apologies"	Andrew Kline, Todd Turnham	1:51
5.	"The Distance"		2:18
6.	"Never Look Back"		2:23
7.	"In the Defiance"		2:57
8.	"The Burden"	Andrew Kline, Rick Rooney	2:43
9.	"Look Away"	Andrew Kline, Scott Vogel	1:00
10.	"Face Your Failures"		1:49
11.	"End of Days"	Andrew Kline, Rick Rooney	3:00
12.	"Life of Death"		3:03
Total length:			28:24

== Personnel ==
=== Strife ===
- Rick Rodney – vocals
- Chad Peterson – bass
- Andrew Kline – guitar
- Todd Turnham – guitar
- Nick Jett – drums

=== Additional musicians ===
- Igor Cavalera – additional drums
- Marc Rizzo – additional guitar

=== Production ===
- Nick Jett – producing and engineering and mixing
- Chris Rakestraw – guitar engineering
- Mauricio Cersosimo – drum engineering
- Guilherme Cersosimo – drum technician
- Eyeone – art design, layout
