= Angermeans =

Studio album by Strife
- Released: 2001
- Studio: The Steakhouse, North Hollywood, CA.
- Genre: Hardcore punk
- Length: 38:58
- Label: Victory Records
- Producer: Sean O'Dwyer, John Nelson, Strife, Rpgello Lozano

Strife chronology
In This Defiance (1997)	Angermeans (2001)	Witness a Rebirth (2012)

Professional ratings
Review scores
Source	Rating
AllMusic	4/5 stars
The Encyclopedia of Popular Music	3/5 stars
Rock Hard	8.5/10

Angermeans is the third full-length album by the Californian hardcore band Strife. It was released in 2001 on Victory Records.

== Critical reception ==
The Daily Herald called the album "vicious," writing that it "has as much Slayer as Agnostic Front in its lineage." AllMusic wrote that it "is not just a comeback for the band, it's a long-overdue kick in the butt for a whole [hardcore] movement as well."

== Track listing ==
All lyrics are written by Rick Rodney; all music is composed by Andrew Kline, except where noted.

No.	Title	Music	Length
1.	"Rise Again"		3:55
2.	"Life Stained Red"		2:52
3.	"Spill No Blood"		3:51
4.	"Angel Wings"		4:23
5.	"Angermeans"		5:31
6.	"From These Graves"		4:22
7.	"Stareing at the Sky"		3:21
8.	"Mine Alone"		3:49
9.	"Everything Stripped Away"	Andrew Kline, Chad Peterson	4:43
10.	"Mon Bel Ami"	Andrew Kline and Tom Bail	2:11
Total length:			38:58

== Personnel ==
=== Strife ===
- Rick Rodney – vocals and photography
- Chad Peterson – bass
- Sidney Niesen – drums
- Andrew Kline – guitar

=== Additional musicians ===
- Tom Ball – additional guitar (on "Angermeans" and "From The Graves")
- Ellie Wyatt – additional violin (on "Angel Wings)
- Eric Bobo – percussion (on "From These Graves)
- Melody Rodney – piano (on "Angel Wings)

=== Production ===
- Sean O'Dwyer – producing and engineering and mixing
- John Nelson – producing and engineering
- Rpgello Lozano – producing
- John Delaney – engineering
- Justina Powell – assistant engineering
- Josh Lynch – drum programming
- Nate Scott – art direction and design, photography
