= Goatboy =

Welsh eclectic rock band

Goatboy was an eclectic rock band blending blues, hip-hop, drum n' bass and stoner rock. Formed in Swansea, South Wales in 1999 by Nik Jenkins, Rod Thomas and Ben Jones.

After a line-up change in 2000 they joined Swansea's Mighty Atom Records where they released their debut album Superlube in 2001. The new line-up saw the band introduce a turntablist Deck-Masha-Slicerman and a new bassist Andrew Baldwin.

Soon after the release of Superlube the band introduced a new bassist Neil Rowling and were commissioned to record a radio session for John Peel (which included a cover of a Kyuss song "100 Degrees"), as well as playing at the Glastonbury Festival 2002 and toured the UK with folk rockers The Levellers.

Their second (and last) release on Mighty Atom Records was the 7 track mini-album Dook of Oil E.P. that was produced and engineered by Greg Haver.

The band split up in December 2003.

== See also ==
- List of Peel sessions#G
