= The Great Wide Open =

EP by Funeral for a Friend
- Released: 15 October 2007
- Recorded: Barfly, London (tracks 2–9)
- Genre: Alternative rock, post-hardcore
- Label: Atlantic
- Producer: Gil Norton (track 1), Romesh Dodangoda (tracks 2–9)

Funeral for a Friend chronology
Tales Don't Tell Themselves (2007)	The Great Wide Open (2007)

The Great Wide Open is a "mini-album" by Funeral for a Friend, featuring the title track taken from their album Tales Don't Tell Themselves. Originally planned as the third single from the album, it was later deferred by two weeks and expanded to a mini-album in order to release the live tracks recorded in August.

== Music video ==
The song's music video shows the band playing in a little shack lost on a beach at night with waves resting on the shore. Around the middle of the video, some green, red and white lights flash throughout the house.

== Mini-album ==
Atlantic Records released the mini album on 15 October 2007. It includes the track of the same name from the 'Tales Don't Tell Themselves' album as well as the video, and also 8 classic live tracks - the 1st 2 EPs 'Between Order & Model' and 'Four Ways to Scream Your Name'.

== Track listing ==
No.	Title	Length
1.	"The Great Wide Open"	3:33
2.	"10.45 Amsterdam Conversations" (Live)	4:14
3.	"Juneau" (Live)	4:11
4.	"Red is the New Black" (Live)	6:00
5.	"The Art of American Football" (Live)	2:48
6.	"This Year's Most Open Heartbreak" (Live)	3:54
7.	"She Drove Me to Daytime Television" (Live)	4:52
8.	"Kiss and Makeup (All Bets Are Off)" (Live)	3:32
9.	"Escape Artists Never Die" (Live)	6:07
10.	"The Great Wide Open" (Video)	3:33

== Reception ==
Professional ratings
Review scores
Source	Rating
BBC Wales	5/5 stars
Sputnikmusic	4.0 / 5.0
Digital Spy	3/5 stars
Ox-Fanzine	8/10 stars

In his review for BBC Wales, James McLaren wrote that, "its complexity, its introspection, its sheer grandiosity and epic nature gets better with each listen; this EP shows Funeral's ability to interact and involve an audience, creating a celebratory atmosphere that is communicated very well here".

Sebastian Wahle of Ox-Fanzine said "this CD shows the development of the band very well, as well as their versatility, and the bottom line is that "The Great Wide Open" is certainly a nice Christmas present for your emo friend.

Alex Flecther wrote in Digital Spy that "while it may lack the sneering, viciousness of some of their earlier works, 'The Great Wide Open' can't be knocked for its aspirations; and although the Welsh post-hardcore screamers may not be quite big enough to fill up football grounds yet, if they have a couple more of these chest-beating anthems locked up in a cupboard somewhere they might not be too far off.

Trey Anastasio of Sputnikmusic gave it a 4.0 rating, stating; "whether this album was released for nostalgia or as kind of an apology to the fans, the end result is the same ... better sounding, heavier versions of the songs on their first two EPs that is well worth seeking out". He also noted that "the vibe is heavy and fun and it may be the last quality release that these guys ever put out".
