= Welcome Home Armageddon =

Album by Funeral for a Friend

Studio album by Funeral for a Friend
- Released: 14 March 2011
- Recorded: September–December 2010 at: Monnow Valley Studio, Rockfield, Monmouthshire, Wales; Long Wave Recording Studio, Cardiff, Wales
- Genre: Post-hardcore, melodic hardcore
- Length: 40:34
- Label: Distiller Records (U.K.); Good Fight Music (U.S.)
- Producer: Romesh Dodangoda

Funeral for a Friend chronology
| The Young and Defenceless (2010) | Welcome Home Armageddon (2011) | See You All in Hell (2011) |

Singles from Welcome Home Armageddon
- 1. "Front Row Seats to the End of the World" Released: 10 January 2011; 2. "Sixteen" Released: 14 March 2011; 3. "Broken Foundation" Released: 13 June 2011

Welcome Home Armageddon is the fifth studio album by Welsh post-hardcore band Funeral for a Friend released on 14 March 2011 in the UK and 15 March 2011 in the US. It was also the last full length Funeral for a Friend album released featuring drummer/screamer Ryan Richards, who had been in the band since the Four Ways to Scream Your Name EP.

Two songs on the album – "Sixteen" and "Damned If You Do, Dead If You Don't" – had previously appeared in the band's 2010 EP The Young & Defenceless.

On 10 January 2011, the band released the music video for the first single off the album, "Front Row Seats to the End of the World". The single was officially released on 24 January 2011. Furthermore, on 9 February 2011, Funeral For A Friend released a music video shot for the album's second single "Sixteen". A music video for the third single, "Broken Foundation" was released in the summer of 2011.

== Background ==
Explaining the album's title, vocalist Matt Davies-Kreye told Complete Music Update: "A friend of mine was mentioning how he felt that the best thing for the planet was for the human race to just drop dead and at times I can see and understand his way of thinking but a big part of me has this (probably) misguided faith in humanity to kind of steer the ship in the right direction for a change. So Welcome Home Armageddon is the idea of patiently waiting for the end to arrive at your doorstep and give you a nice big hug."

== Track listing ==
| No. | Title | Length |
|---|---|---|
| 1. | "This Side of Brightness" | 0:44 |
| 2. | "Old Hymns" | 2:32 |
| 3. | "Front Row Seats to the End of the World" | 3:30 |
| 4. | "Sixteen" | 2:50 |
| 5. | "Aftertaste" | 3:37 |
| 6. | "Spinning Over the Island" | 5:03 |
| 7. | "Man Alive" | 2:49 |
| 8. | "Owls (Are Watching)" | 3:32 |
| 9. | "Damned If You Do, Dead If You Don't" | 3:29 |
| 10. | "Medicated" | 3:36 |
| 11. | "Broken Foundation" | 3:29 |
| 12. | "Welcome Home Armageddon" | 5:25 |
| Total length: | | 40:34 |

=== Bonus tracks ===
Japanese bonus track
| No. | Title | Length |
|---|---|---|
| 13. | "Breakdown Avenue" | 2:44 |

HMV pre-order exclusive download
| No. | Title | Length |
|---|---|---|
| 13. | "Streetcar" (Acoustic) | 3:43 |

iTunes bonus track
| No. | Title | Length |
|---|---|---|
| 13. | "Breakdown Avenue" | 2:44 |
| 14. | "Symbolism in the Neighbourhood" | 3:12 |

Deluxe edition bonus DVD
| No. | Title | Length |
|---|---|---|
| 1. | "Symbolism in the Neighbourhood" | 3:10 |
| 2. | "Sixteen (Demo Version)" | 2:47 |
| 3. | "Sixteen (Acoustic Version)" | 3:01 |
| 4. | "Damned If You Do, Dead If You Don't (Demo Version)" | 3:28 |
| 5. | "Front Row Seats To The End of The World (Video)" | 3:43 |
| 6. | "Serpents In Solitude (Video)" | 3:37 |
| 7. | "Brazilian Tour Documentary" | 9:58 |

== Critical reception ==
Professional ratings
Aggregate scores
| Source | Rating |
|---|---|
| Metacritic | (77/100) |
Review scores
| Source | Rating |
| Rocksound | 9/10 stars |
| MusicOMH | 3/5 stars |
| Bring The Noise | 8/10 stars |
| Sputnikmusic | 4/5 stars |
| Kerrang! | 4/5 stars |
| Exclaim.ca | (Unfavourable) |
| Absolutepunk.net | 87% |
| BBC Music | (favourable) |
| Allmusic | 3.5/5 stars |

Welcome Home Armageddon received generally positive reviews from music critics. At Metacritic, which assigns a normalized rating out of 100 to reviews from mainstream critics, the album received an average score of 77, based on 10 reviews, which indicates "generally favorable reviews".

Rocksound"Welcome Home Armageddon is an extremely satisfying album, for fans old and new. Ferocious and beautiful - Funeral for a Friend sound more like themselves than they have done in years."

MusicOMH (3/5) "Armageddon is a sop to the disaffected fans of FFAF's pomp, and in seeking to recapture their ardour it tries too hard to pander to their needs. And from the few tracks that evidence what could have been, that's a shame."

Bring The Noise (8/10) "...although there are heavy elements on this, the Welsh favourites' fifth album, the real theme running throughout the record is that of a pop-punk masterpiece."

SputnikMusic (4/5) "Simply put, this is Funeral for a Friend's best album."

Absolutepunk.net (87%) "Top to bottom this album feels like a classic; a show stopper. No thrills, no cheap tricks and gimmicks. Where so many bands attempt to go back to their roots and fall short, Funeral for a Friend find themselves back in a comfort zone and pushing themselves to even better heights."

Allmusic.com (3.5/5) "Welcome Home Armageddon has something that's missing from all the cookie-cutter screamo albums that have flooded the market in the 21st century: an honest to God sense of pop/rock craftsmanship."

== Recording personnel ==
Funeral For a Friend

- Matthew Davies-Kreye – lead vocals
- Kris Coombs-Roberts – guitar, backing vocals
- Gavin Burrough – guitar, backing vocals
- Ryan Richards – drums, unclean vocals
- Richard Boucher – bass guitar

Additional personnel

- Romesh Dodangoda – production, mixing
- Shawn Joseph – mastering
- Rob Thomas – assistant engineer
- Rianne Rowlands - Album Artwork - Illustrations
- Ryan Waring – Logo Design
- Jamie Telford, Danny Bugler & Rhodri Jones Gang vocals on "Damned If You Do, Dead If You Don't"

== Release history ==
| Country | Date | Label | Format | Catalog number | Source |
|---|---|---|---|---|---|
| United Kingdom | 14 March 2011 | Distiller Records | CD | DTLBM006X | |
| United States | 15 March 2011 | Good Fight Music | CD | | |
| Australia | 18 March 2011 | Good Fight Music | CD | | |

== Chart performance ==
| Chart (2011) | Peak position |
|---|---|
| Australia Albums Chart | 98 |
| Scottish Albums Chart | 37 |
| UK Albums Chart | 33 |
| UK Rock Albums | 2 |
