= Hondo Maclean =

Welsh hardcore punk band

- Also known as: Mongrel
- Origin: Bridgend, Wales, UK
- Genres: Post-hardcore; metalcore
- Years active: 2001–2007, 2011, 2014
- Label: Mighty Atom Records
- Spinoffs: Funeral for a Friend, the Future
- Past members: Ben Woosnam; Gavin Burrough; Gavin Philips; Johnny Phillips; Rich Boucher; Ryan Richards; Grant Robinson; Jake Thomas; Andy Davies; Michael Davies; Rhys Jenkins

Hondo Maclean was a post-hardcore band from Bridgend, Wales. They released their debut EP Finding Joy in 2002, followed by Plans for A Better Day and Chasing Angels. Their debut full-length Unspoken Dialect was released in 2005. Sharing multiple members with Funeral for a Friend, the two bands were amongst the most prominent bands to popularised a heavier take on emo in Welsh. Hondo Maclean disbanded in 2007. They eventually reunited for one-night-only. They reuinted again in 2014, releasing their second album The Truth; The Fiction.

== History ==
The band formed under the name Mongrel. Following the departure of drummer Johnny Phillips, they changed their name. They took the name Hondo Maclean from a character in 1980s cartoon series M.A.S.K.. Hondo Maclean emerged from the South Wales hardcore scene to wider recognition, including touring with former Jackass star Steve-O and engaging in their own headline tour. Phillips went on to found Funeral for a Friend, and was replaced by Ryan Richards who soon also replaced Phillips in Funeral for a Friend.

Between 10 and 14 September 2003, they toured the UK with Matchbook Romance. Between 18 September and 7 October, they supported Johnny Truant on their UK headline tour. Between 7 and 16 October, they supported Funeral for a Friend on their headline tour.

Between 10 and 23 February 2004, they headlined a tour of the UK. Between 27 April and 1 May, they support Poison the Well on their UK headline tour. That year, they supported Lostprophets on their UK headline tour. In May, they supported My Chemical Romance on their UK headline Honda Civic tour. In May, they recorded their debut album and announced it would be released on 27 September. Between 5 and 9 July, they supported Alexisonfire on their UK headline tour.

Between 8 and 12 January 2005, they toured the UK as a part of the Mighty Atom Records Tour alongside Hollywood Ending, Hiding With Girls and Cry For Silence. They were originally set headlined a tour of the United Kingdom between 2 and 3 March, however the dates were changed to between 19 and 28 April 2005. Between 21 and 23 April, they supported Funeral for a Friend on their short run of live dates. They performed at Truck Festival 2005 alongside Jetplane Landing and Biffy Clyro. On 27 July, they supported Million Dead and Emanuel, alongside Jets vs Sharks and In Flight Program in Yeovil. On 13 August, they headlined Ghost Festival in Leeds. They performed at Collision Course festival 2006.

Hondo Maclean announced their disbandment on 16 February 2007. Gav Burrough joined Funeral for a Friend. Members additionally formed the Future, Ghostlines and Shadows into Light. Some members formed Korsakoffs.

In July 2011, a one-night-only reunion show by Hondo Maclean was announced. The show took place on 30 December 2011.

In November 2014, the band released 300 vinyl exclusive copies of The Truth; The Fiction; their second studio album. The album was recorded over six years previously while the band were going under the name of The Future. They performed a live date at London venue the Barfly on 12 December and Bridgend venue Hobos on 13 December.

== Musical style ==
Hondo Maclean's music has been categorised as post-hardcore and metalcore. They cited influenced including Drowningman, Poison the Well, Hopesfall, Slayer and Mogwai.

Alongside Funeral for a Friend, the Blackout and Kids in Glass Houses, Hondo Maclean was amongst a wave of Welsh bands that helped to popularised a heavier take on emo. At the time, the British music press called this style "extremo". They have been cited as an influence by Casey.

== Members ==
- Ben Woosnam – vocals (2001–2007, 2011, 2014)
- Gavin Burrough – guitar (2001–2007, 2011, 2014)
- Gavin Philips – guitar (2001–2007, 2011, 2014)
- Johnny Phillips – drums (2001)
- Rich Boucher – bass (2001–2007, 2011, 2014)
- Ryan Richards – drums (2001–2003), keyboards (2005)
- Grant Robinson – drums (2003–2004)
- Jake Thomas – drums (2004–2007, 2011, 2014)
- Andy Davies – keyboards (2014)
- Michael Davies – vocals
- Rhys Jenkins – guitar

== Discography ==
=== Albums ===
- Unspoken Dialect (2005) (Mighty Atom)
- The Truth; The Fiction (2014)

=== EPs ===
- Finding Joy (2002)
- Plans for A Better Day (2003) (Mighty Atom)
- Chasing Angels (2003) (Mighty Atom)
