= Seven Ways to Scream Your Name =

EP by Funeral for a Friend
- Released: 21 October 2003
- Recorded: Mighty Atom Studios (Swansea, South Wales); Chapel Studios (Lincolnshire, England) in January and February 2003
- Genre: Post-hardcore
- Length: 28:10
- Label: Ferret Music
- Producers: Joe Gibb; Colin Richardson; Funeral for a Friend

Funeral for a Friend chronology
Casually Dressed & Deep in Conversation (2003)	Seven Ways to Scream Your Name (2003)	Hours (2005)

Professional ratings
Review scores
Source	Rating
Allmusic	2.5/5 stars
Exclaim.ca	(Favourable)

Seven Ways to Scream Your Name is the third EP released by the Welsh post-hardcore band Funeral for a Friend. The EP was released on 21 October 2003 (see 2003 in music) through Ferret Music and was produced by Joe Gibb (selected tracks), Colin Richardson (selected tracks) and the band (selected tracks). The band did not include every track from the EPs to ensure the original EPs would be valuable.

Seven Ways to Scream Your Name was released in the United States to promote Funeral for a Friend and their first album, Casually Dressed & Deep in Conversation, released in the U.S. in 2004. The EP features songs from the band's earlier EPs, Between Order & Model and Four Ways to Scream Your Name, as well as "The Getaway Plan" from the "Juneau" single.

== Track listing ==
No.	Title	Length
1.	"10.45 Amsterdam Conversations"	3:46
2.	"Red Is the New Black"	5:14
3.	"The Art of American Football"	2:33
4.	"The Getaway Plan"	4:22
5.	"This Year's Most Open Heartbreak"	2:49
6.	"Kiss and Makeup"	3:59
7.	"Escape Artists Never Die"	5:27
Total length:		28:10

"Kiss and Makeup" is also known as "Kiss and Makeup (All Bets Are Off)" on other CDs.

10.45 Amsterdam Conversations is also known as 10:45 Amsterdam Conversations

== Personnel ==
- Kris Coombs-Roberts – guitar
- Gareth Davies – bass guitar, backing clean vocals
- Matt Davies – vocals
- Ryan Richards – drums, unclean vocals
- Darran Smith – guitar
- Written and performed by Funeral for a Friend
- Produced and mixed by Joe Gibb (tracks 1–4) with co-production by Funeral for a Friend (tracks 1–3)
- Produced and mixed by Colin Richardson (tracks 5–7) with co-production by Funeral for a Friend (tracks 5–7)
- Engineered by Roger Hopkins and Alwyn Davies (tracks 1–3)
- Engineered by Alwyn Davies and Joe Gibb (track 4)
- Engineered by Colin Richardson and Will Bartle (tracks 5–7)
- Recorded at Mighty Atom Studios (Swansea, South Wales) (tracks 1–3)
- Recorded at Chapel Studios (Lincolnshire, England) in January and February 2003 (tracks 4–7)
- Art direction and design by Asterik Studio (Seattle, Washington)
- Managed by Craig Jennings and Rod Smallwood for Sanctuary Artist Management
- Legal representation by Sarah Waddington for the Simkins Partnership
- Booked by Geoff Meall (United Kingdom) and Jeremy Holgerson (United States)
