= Major League (band) =

American rock band

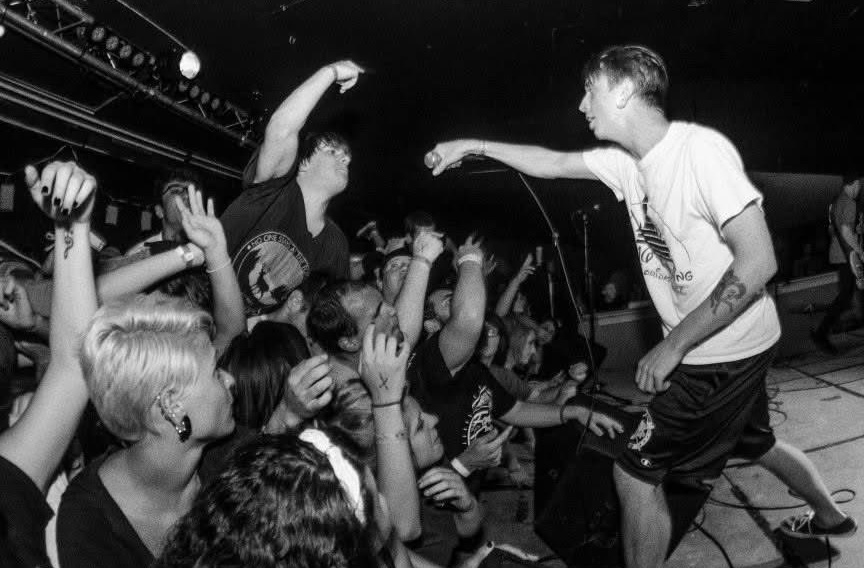
- Major League performing in 2013

Background information
- Origin: Mantua Township, New Jersey, U.S.
- Genres: Pop punk; soft grunge; easycore (early)
- Years active: 2009–2016; 2025–Present
- Label: No Sleep Records
- Members: Nick Trask; Brian Anthony Joyce; Matt Chila; Eric Bouda; Luke Smartnick
- Past members: Kyle Bell; Justin Unruh
- Website: majorleaguenj.com

Major League is an American rock band from Mantua Township, New Jersey, originally active from 2009 to 2016. Their music blends pop punk, easycore, emo, and soft grunge music. They released two studio albums on No Sleep Records: Hard Feelings (2012) and There's Nothing Wrong with Me (2014). In June of 2025 the band announced they were reuniting with their original lineup.

== History ==
=== Formation and Early Years (2009–2011) ===
Major League was formed in 2009 in Mantua Township, New Jersey, initiated by guitarist Brian Anthony Joyce, soon joined by vocalist Nick Trask, guitarist Matt Chila, bassist Eric Bouda, and drummer Justin Unruh. They self-released two EPs—The Truth Is... (2010) and Variables (2011)—which both included early tracks like “From States Away” and “Seasons.” These songs helped define the band's emotionally driven pop‑punk sound. In April 2011, drummer Justin Unruh left the band and was succeeded by Luke Smartnick. During this time, the band toured extensively through small clubs, DIY spaces, and house shows, developing a grassroots fan base and regional reputation.

=== Hard Feelings and Rise in Popularity (2012–2013) ===
In 2012, the band signed with No Sleep Records and released their debut full-length album, Hard Feelings, on November 13. The album combined introspective lyrics with driving, guitar‑centric energy, reflecting the emo‑revival and pop‑punk trends of the early 2010s. Critics generally responded positively: *Consequence of Sound* noted the album’s “raw honesty and melodic sensibility,” while *Stereofox* described it as “a punchy and passionate effort that balances emo revivalism with pop-punk urgency.”

To promote the album, Major League toured across North America, supporting acts such as Man Overboard, Senses Fail, and Turnover. Internationally, they performed in the UK and Europe with Funeral for a Friend and toured Japan with Chunk! No, Captain Chunk!. In 2013, they also appeared at the Skate and Surf Festival in New Jersey.

=== There's Nothing Wrong with Me and Lineup Change (2014–2015) ===
In early 2014, vocalist Nick Trask left the band, with guitarist Brian Joyce taking over lead vocals. The band entered Studio 4 in Conshohocken, Pennsylvania, to record their second full-length album with producer Will Yip.

Released in late 2014, There's Nothing Wrong with Me explored themes of personal reflection and emotional growth. According to Joyce, the record was “very honest and personal,” marking a shift toward a more introspective tone. The album's artwork, a mirrored inkblot design, reinforced its focus on mental health and identity.

The band supported the release with tours alongside PVRIS, Mayday Parade, Silverstein, Stray from the Path, and Beartooth. In 2015, they were part of the Vans Warped Tour lineup.

=== Farewell Tour and Disbandment (2016) ===
On January 15, 2016, Major League announced a farewell tour and confirmed they would disband following its completion. The tour featured support from Forever Came Calling and served as a retrospective on the band’s career.

=== Hiatus, 2025 Activity and Future (2017–Present) ===
After disbanding, members pursued individual projects. The band’s music continued to receive steady streaming activity. In 2025, the band's official Instagram account posted rehearsal footage and archival material featuring the original lineup, prompting speculation about a reunion.

On June 17, the band announced that they would be pressing The Truth Is... on vinyl for the first time for the EP's 15 year anniversary. The following day they confirmed they were reuniting with the with a mix of old and new member’s.

On August 19, Major League announced their first performance since their 2016 hiatus through an Instagram post. The band stated they would perform their 2010 EP The Truth Is... in full, along with additional material, at the Williams Center in Rutherford, New Jersey on November 21, 2025, with With The Punches and Forever Came Calling.

On January 26, 2026, the band announced a co-headline tour with Hit The Lights, their first tour since reuniting, marking their return to the scene.

== Band members ==
Current members

- Nick Trask - Lead Vocals (2009–2014, 2025–present)
- Brian Anthony Joyce – Guitar, Vocals (2009–2014, 2025–Present), Lead vocals (2014–2016)
- Matt Chila – Guitar (2009–2016, 2025–present)
- Eric Bouda - Bass (2009-2012, 2025–present)
- Luke Smartnick – Drums (2011-2016, 2025–present)

Former members

- Justin Unruh - Drums (2009-2011)
- Kyle Bell – Bass (2012-2016)

Timeline

== Discography ==
=== Albums ===
- Hard Feelings (2012)
- There's Nothing Wrong with Me (2014)

=== Compilation albums ===
- Mixtape (2011)

=== Extended plays ===
- The Truth Is... (2010)
- Variables (2011)

=== Split EPs ===
- Cities and States (with Giants At Large) (2012)
