= Casually Dressed & Deep in Conversation =

Studio album by Funeral for a Friend
- Released: 13 October 2003
- Recorded: Mid-2003
- Studios: Chapel (Lincolnshire); Miloco (London); RAK (London)
- Genres: Pop screamo; emo
- Length: 49:36
- Labels: Atlantic; Mighty Atom; Ferret
- Producers: Colin Richardson; Funeral for a Friend

Funeral for a Friend chronology
Four Ways to Scream Your Name (2003)	Casually Dressed & Deep in Conversation (2003)	Seven Ways to Scream Your Name (2003)

Singles from Casually Dressed & Deep in Conversation
- 1. "Juneau" Released: 17 August 2003; 2. "She Drove Me to Daytime Television" Released: 15 September 2003; 3. "Bullet Theory" Released: 18 October 2003; 4. "Escape Artists Never Die" Released: 2 February 2004

Casually Dressed & Deep in Conversation is the debut studio album by the Welsh rock band Funeral for a Friend. It was released on 13 October 2003 through Atlantic Records and was produced by Colin Richardson with co-production by the band themselves. The cover of the album as well as its subsequent singles is based on a small series of paintings by Belgian artist René Magritte titled: "The Lovers".

The album received positive reception from critics and was a commercial success. It was included on NME's album of the year list for 2003, and Rock Sound's 101 Modern Classics list. debuted at number 12 on the UK charts and achieved Gold certifications after a sales of 100,000 a year after its release on 29 October 2004.

== Background ==
The album featured newly recorded versions of "Red is the New Black" and "Juno" (renamed "Juneau") from the band's "Between Order And Model" EP.

It also features remastered versions of "She Drove Me To Daytime Television" and "Escape Artists Never Die" from Four Ways To Scream Your Name (the latter is slightly remixed).

"Waking Up" was a largely rewritten version of "Summer's Dead and Buried", which was one of the band's earliest songs. "Storytelling" had previously been recorded in studio after Between Order And Model came out. The band liked this demo, but this version hadn't been released at the time (it can be found on the "Between Order And Model" 10th anniversary edition, as well as the out of print Digital 3CD edition of Your History Is Mine). "Moments Forever Faded" was also previously demoed (featured on the 3CD Digital edition of 'Your History Is Mine).

"Rookie of the Year" was featured on the soundtracks of WWE WrestleMania 21 and Burnout 3: Takedown. "Red Is The New Black" was used in the Torchwood episode "They Keep Killing Suzie".

== Release ==
In 2012 the band released a live album titled Casually Dressed and Deep in Conversation: Live and in Full at Shepherds Bush Empire. The live album was recorded at the Shepherd's Bush Empire in London in July 2010. The live performance's setlist featured the debut album in its entirety, plus additional tracks from other albums in its encore. The album was announced in January 2011, with no tentative release date announced but a teaser trailer was posted. The live recording featured guitarist Darran Smith before he left the band in late 2010. He was replaced by Richard Boucher, who was a member of hardcore punk band Hondo Maclean. The album was released in early April 2012 and was made available through the band's online store to purchase. To celebrate the 10th anniversary of the album, it was repressed on double white 180g vinyl as a limited edition release for Record Store Day 2013.

== Reception ==
Professional ratings
Review scores
Source	Rating
AbsolutePunk	88%
AllMusic	2.5/5 stars
BBC Music	(Favourable)
Drowned in Sound	9/10 stars
Exclaim!	(Favourable)
MusicOMH	(Favourable)
NME	8/10 stars
Sputnikmusic	4/5

The album received very positive reviews from the British music press upon its release. With NME writer Dan Martin gave the album at 8 out of 10 and praised the album quite considerably calling it a "fearsome debut" and stating that: "It would be unfair on everyone else to call 'Casually Dressed and Deep in Conversation' the first great album to come out of all this. But what is true is that this fiery, dynamic hulk of a record will be the first to break properly out into daylight." It was also featured at number 17 in New Musical Express's albums of the year list for 2003.

In 2012, British publication Rock Sound added Casually Dressed & Deep in Conversation into their "101 Modern Classics", placed at number 33, between Lamb of God's As the Palaces Burn and Glassjaw's Worship and Tribute, stating that "‘Casually Dressed…’ evidences a remarkable young band who, on their debut full-length release, were already the finished article, establishing a sound that continues to define an entire generation."

== Track listing ==
All tracks are written by Funeral for a Friend.

Casually Dressed & Deep in Conversation track listing
No.	Title	Length
1.	"Rookie of the Year"	3:01
2.	"Bullet Theory"	3:53
3.	"Juneau"	3:38
4.	"Bend Your Arms to Look Like Wings"	4:21
5.	"Escape Artists Never Die"	5:18
6.	"Storytelling"	3:35
7.	"Moments Forever Faded"	4:25
8.	"She Drove Me to Daytime Television"	3:36
9.	"Red Is the New Black"	5:15
10.	"Your Revolution Is a Joke"	2:44
11.	"Waking Up"	3:59
12.	"Novella"	5:50
Total length:		49:36

Japanese bonus tracks
No.	Title	Length
13.	"This Year's Most Open Heartbreak"	2:43
14.	"Kiss and Makeup (All Bets Are Off)"	3:54
Total length:		56:14

== Personnel ==
Funeral for a Friend

- Gareth Davies – bass guitar, vocals
- Kris Roberts – lead guitar
- Matt Davies – vocals
- Ryan Richards – drums, vocals
- Darran Smith – lead guitar

Production credits

- Written and performed by Funeral for a Friend
- Produced and mixed by Colin Richardson
- Co-produced by Funeral for a Friend
- Recorded at Chapel Studios, Rak Studios and Miloco Studios (London)
- Engineered by Colin Richardson with Matt Hyde, Will Bartle and Richard Woodcraft
- Mastered by Howie Weinberg at Masterdisc
- Photography by Chris Dunlop
- Live photography by Anna Gudaniec and George Davison
- Art design by Barny Bewick for Indium Design, inspired by René Magritte

== Charts ==
=== Album ===
Chart performance for Casually Dressed & Deep in Conversation
Chart (2012)	Peak position
UK Albums Chart	12
US Top Heatseekers	34
US Independent Albums	26

=== Singles ===
Chart performance for singles from Casually Dressed & Deep in Conversation
Year	Title	Chart position
Year	Title	UK Singles
2003	"Juneau"	19
2003	"She Drove Me to Daytime Television"/"Bullet Theory"	20
2004	"Escape Artists Never Die"	19

== Certifications ==
Certifications for Casually Dressed & Deep in Conversation
Region	Certification	Certified units/sales
United Kingdom (BPI)	Gold	100,000^{^}
^{^} Shipments figures based on certification alone.
