= In This Defiance =

Studio album by Strife
- Released: April 22, 1997
- Genre: Hardcore punk
- Length: 44:39
- Label: Victory
- Producer: Strife

Strife chronology
One Truth (1994)	In This Defiance (1997)	Angermeans (2001)

Professional ratings
Review scores
Source	Rating
AllMusic	4.5/5 stars

In This Defiance is the second full-length album release by California hardcore band Strife.

== Legacy and reception ==
The album proved to be the bands' defining moment, as it continuously gained recognition over the years. It was ranked 7th among the Top 10 most Underrated Hardcore Albums by Metal Hammer magazine, and AllMusic stated that this album was when "Strife finally hit everything just right. Their sound is big and full, yet almost clinically tight; the tempos are brisk, sometimes headlong."

In 2017, the album was reissued on vinyl with a limited run of only 100 copies through guitarist Andrew Kline's own record label WAR Records. It was subsequently re-released on vinyl by Victory Records in 2020. In 2018, Strife performed the album in its entirety at a select run of concerts.

== Track listing ==
No.	Title	Length
1.	"Intro"	2:57
2.	"Waiting"	2:13
3.	"Force of Change"	1:53
4.	"Stand as One (Redemption)"	2:28
5.	"Grey"	3:07
6.	"Will to Die"	2:49
7.	"Blistered"	2:27
8.	"Forgotten One"	1:39
9.	"Wish I Knew"	4:22
10.	"To an End"	1:53
11.	"Overthrow"	2:44
12.	"Outtro"	4:50/16:07
Total length:		44:39

== Personnel ==
Strife

- Todd Turnham - guitar
- Andrew Kline - guitar
- Rick Rodney - vocals
- Sid Niesen - drums
- Chad Peterson - bass

Additional musicians

- Igor Cavalera - additional drums
- Chino Moreno - additional vocals (on "Will to Die")
- Dino Cazares - additional guitar and background vocals
- Tony Moore - background vocals
- Ryan Cox - background vocals
- Jesse Austin - background vocals
- Justin "Gordo" Dedda - background vocals
- John Turnham - background vocals
- Dom Brooklyn House - background vocals
- Dave STS - background vocals
- Mark Aiken - background vocals
- Darren Doane - background vocals
- Erin Smith - background vocals
- Jen Eisle - background vocals
- Vic Galindo - background vocals
- Ian Ghent - background vocals
- Bobby Canaday - background vocals
- David Couzens - background vocals
- Zack Cordner - background vocals
- Dan Rawe - background vocals
- Jeff Moore - background vocals
- Weddy Moore - background vocals
- Aaron Bruno - background vocals
- John Monroy - background vocals
- Ben Read - background vocals
- Dirty Ass Dan - background vocals
- Party Up - background vocals
- Stacie - background vocals
- Nick Johnson - background vocals

Production

- Dave Jagosz - recording
- Billy "the Kid" - engineering
- Bob Malrlette - mixing and mastering
- Ken Koroshetz - engineering
- Pat Sulivan - mastering
- Shuji Kobayashi - booklet photography
- OLECHR. Petterson - CD face and tray photography
- Ron Platzer - CD face and tray photography
