= Kicking and Screaming (song) =

Single by Funeral for a Friend

from the album Memory and Humanity
- Released: 28 September 2008
- Genre: Alternative rock
- Length: 3:25
- Label: Join Us (UK); Victory Records (Canada, U.S.); Roadrunner Records (Worldwide)
- Songwriter(s): Kris Coombs, Gareth Ellis-Davies, Matthew Davies-Kreye, Ryan Richards, Darran Smith

Funeral for a Friend singles chronology
| "Waterfront Dance Club / Beneath the Burning Tree" (2008) | "Kicking and Screaming" (2008) | "Rules and Games" (2009) |

"Kicking and Screaming" is a song by Welsh post-hardcore band Funeral for a Friend, the song was released as the second single from their fourth album, Memory and Humanity, released on 28 September 2008. A video for the single directed by Nicholas (Nick) Bartleet and cinematographed by Eric Maddison made its debut on 9 August 2008. The song is Funeral for a Friend's lowest ever charting single, debuting at #116 in the UK, when all other singles reached the top 40, although Rules and Games failed to even make the top 200 in 2009. Unlike most of the other songs on the album, Kicking and Screaming is leaned towards a much more alternative rock sound.

== Track listing ==
=== CD ===
1. "Kicking and Screaming" - 3:25
2. "Constant Illuminations" - 2:56
3. "Faster" - 3:54

=== Vinyl ===
1. "Kicking and Screaming"
2. "Join Us" - 3:48

=== Download bundle ===
1. "Kicking and Screaming"
2. "Faster"
3. "Join Us"
4. "Kicking and Screaming" (Demo) - 3:30
5. "Kicking and Screaming" (Ghostlines remix) - 3:49

== Charts ==
| Chart (2008) | Peak position |
|---|---|
| UK Singles Chart | 116 |
| UK Indie Chart | 4 |
