= Memory and Humanity =

Studio album by Funeral for a Friend
- Released: 13 October 2008
- Recorded: February–July 2008
- Genre: Post-hardcore, alternative rock
- Length: 44:21
- Label: Join Us (U.K.); Victory (Canada, U.S.); Roadrunner (Worldwide)
- Producer: Romesh Dodangoda

Funeral for a Friend chronology
Tales Don't Tell Themselves (2007)	Memory and Humanity (2008)	Your History Is Mine: 2002–2009 (2009)

Singles from Memory and Humanity
- 1. "Waterfront Dance Club / Beneath the Burning Tree" Released: 14 July 2008; 2. "Kicking and Screaming" Released: 28 September 2008; 3. "Rules and Games" Released: 23 March 2009

Professional ratings
Review scores
Source	Rating
Kerrang!	4/5 stars
NME	6/10 stars
Q	2/5 stars
Rock Sound	8/10 stars
Exclaim.ca	(Mixed)
Sputnikmusic	3.5/5 stars

Memory and Humanity is the fourth studio album by Welsh post-hardcore band Funeral for a Friend, released on 13 October 2008. The album was released through the band's own record label Join Us Records in the UK, Victory Records in the US and Canada, and Roadrunner Records in the rest of the world.

== Production ==
On 26 January 2008, drummer Ryan Richards made an announcement on the band's forum, stating that FFAF were to spend the first few months of the year recording, with a view to releasing a four or five track EP in March or April 2008. After writing more material than originally planned, the band decided to release a full-length album instead, expected out in September. Ryan also announced that the new album would contain harsh/screaming vocals, riffs and would be closer to Casually Dressed and Deep in Conversation than any of their other albums, although it would still be significantly different and more technical, saying that they want to move forward, and never back to any old style.

== Release ==
The first single from the album, "Waterfront Dance Club", was released on 14 July 2008, in the 7" format as a double A-side along with the track "Beneath the Burning Tree", whilst the song "Waterfront Dance Club" was released as a free download on the same day. The song made its debut on BBC Radio 1's Rock Show on 3 June 2008. It also marked Funeral for a Friend's first release on their own record label, "Join Us".

On 9 August 2008, the video for the second single from the album, "Kicking and Screaming", appeared on the band's MySpace page.

The album was released on 13 October 2008 and reached #17 in the UK album charts selling 10,000 copies.

== Track listing ==
No.	Title	Length
1.	"Rules and Games"	2:48
2.	"To Die Like Mouchette"	3:20
3.	"Kicking and Screaming"	3:23
4.	"Constant Illuminations"	2:56
5.	"Maybe I Am?"	3:36
6.	"You Can't See the Forest for the Wolves"	3:22
7.	"Building"	2:38
8.	"Beneath the Burning Tree"	3:34
9.	"Someday the Fire..."	3:13
10.	"Waterfront Dance Club"	4:22
11.	"Charlie Don't Surf"	3:44
12.	"Ghosts"	3:00
13.	"Constant Resurrections"	4:25
Total length:		44:21

Japanese bonus tracks
No.	Title	Length
14.	"Join Us"	3:48
15.	"Faster"	3:49

== Personnel ==
Funeral for a Friend:

- Kris Coombs-Roberts – guitar
- Gareth Ellis-Davies – bass guitar, backing vocals
- Matthew Davies-Kreye – vocals, guitar (tracks 11), keyboards (tracks 1, 3, 9 and 13)
- Ryan Richards – drums, unclean vocals, keyboards (tracks 12), guitar (tracks 13)
- Darran Smith – guitar
- Romesh Dodangoda - producer, engineer, mixing, backing vocals (tracks 1 and 9)
- Matthew Evans - backing vocals (track 1)
- Lee Gaze, Mike Lewis, Stuart Richardson and Ilan Rubin of Lostprophets - backing vocals (track 9)
- Rob Thomas - assistant engineer
- Ted Jensen - mastering
- Memory and Humanity was recorded at Long Wave Studios in Cardiff, Wales

== Charts ==
Chart performance for Memory and Humanity
Chart (2008)	Peak position
Australian Albums (ARIA)	68
Irish Albums (IRMA)	71
Scottish Albums (OCC)	20
UK Albums (OCC)	17
UK Independent Albums (OCC)	2
UK Rock & Metal Albums (OCC)	1
US Independent Albums (Billboard)	44
US Heatseekers Albums (Billboard)	6
