= Strife (band) =

American hardcore punk band

- Origin: Thousand Oaks, California, U.S.
- Genre: Hardcore punk • metalcore
- Years active: 1991–1999, 2001–present
- Labels: WAR, Caroline, Victory
- Members: Todd Turnham; Andrew Kline; Pepe Clarke; Chad J. Peterson; Rick Rodney
- Past members: Mike Hartsfield; Mike Machin; Sid Niesen

Strife is an American hardcore punk band from Thousand Oaks, California. They formed in 1991.

== Biography ==
Their first LP, One Truth, was released in 1994 via Victory Records.

Their second album, In This Defiance, was released in 1997 and includes guest appearances, with Chino Moreno of Deftones, Dino Cazares of Fear Factory and Igor Cavalera of Sepultura all taking turns on the album.

They broke up two years later citing creative differences and exhaustion. Victory Records released Truth Through Defiance, a compilation of live tracks and previously unreleased material.

They reunited in 2000, playing several benefit concerts. By the following year, they had re-formed and released Angermeans. No longer straight edge, this album was considered by the band to be a more mature and focused continuation of In This Defiance.

Since 2001, they have played several shows and tours all over the globe again, including a Japan tour with Floorpunch in 2011, a tour of South America, a European tour, and some dates in Mexico.

They traveled to Brazil to record Witness a Rebirth. Guitarist Andrew Kline commented the album would be "more along the lines of In This Defiance". It was also revealed that Igor Cavalera, formerly of Sepultura and Cavalera Conspiracy, would be handling all drum duties for the album.

== Members ==
Current

- Andrew Kline – guitar
- Chad J. Peterson – bass guitar
- Rick Rodney – vocals
- Todd Turnham – guitar
- Pepe Clarke – drums

Former

- Sid Niesen - drums
- Mike Hartsfield - guitar & bass
- Mike Machin – guitar
- Etienne Fauquet from French band Out – guitar on Angermeans, US Tour
- Aaron Rossi – drums
- Craig Anderson – drums

== Discography ==
=== Albums ===
- One Truth (1994, Caroline Records)
  - reissued in 1994 on CD/LP/CS by Victory Records 014
  - reissued in 2006 on CD by Victory Records
- In This Defiance CD/LP/CS (1997, Victory Records 054)
  - reissued in 2006 on CD by Victory Records
- Angermeans CD (2001, Victory Records 130)
  - reissued in 2006 on CD by Victory Records
- Witness a Rebirth CD/LP/Digital (2012, 6131 Records 048)
  - released in UK / Europe on CD/LP by Holy Roar Records
  - released in Australia on CD/LP by Dogfight Records
  - released in South America on CD by Caustic Recordings

=== Singles & EPs ===
- My Fire Burns On... (1992, New Age Records)
- Strife (1992)
- Grey 7" single (1995, Victory Records)
- Incision [EP] (2015)

=== Compilations ===
- Truth Through Defiance CD/LP/CS (1999, Victory Records 092)
  - compilation of rare, demo, live, and alternate recordings
    - reissued in 2006 on CD by Victory Records

=== Compilation appearances ===
- Only the Strong MCMXCIII CD/LP (1993, Victory Records VR10)
  - includes the song "What Will Remain?"
- Anti-Matter CD/LP/CS (1996, Another Planet Records 6006)
  - includes the song "Circuit"
- California Takeover Live CD/LP/CS (1996, Victory Records 042)
  - includes the songs "To an End", "Lift", and "Clam the Fire"
- Cinema Beer Nuts CD (1997, Hopeless Records 623)
  - includes the song "Blistered"
- God Money CD/CS (1997, V2 Records 27002)
  - includes the song "Untitled"
- It's for Life CD (1997, Victory Records)
  - includes the song "Am I the Only One?"
- Localism: A Compilation of Bands From the Oxnard Area (1996, It's Alive Records)
  - includes the song "Dedication"
- Victory Style II CD (1997, Victory Records 055)
  - includes the song "Force of Change"
- Area 51 CD (1998, Victory Records 067)
  - includes the song "Forgotten One"
- STV Sessions 1.0 CD (1998, 4:20 Records 4201)
  - includes the song "Circuit"
- Victory Singles, Vol. 2 CD (1998, Victory Records 079)
  - includes the songs "To an End" and "Grey"
    - reissued in 2006 on CD by Victory Records
- Victory Style III CD (1998, Victory Records 087)
  - includes the song "Waiting"
- Victory Style 4 CD (2000, Victory Records 115)
  - includes the song "Untitled"
- Decapitated CD (Oglio Records/Glue Factory Records 70004)
  - includes the song "Circuit"
- Expose Yourself CD (Go-Kart Records 300038)
  - includes the song "Blistered"

=== Videography ===
- One Truth Live VHS (1996, Victory Records 043)
  - reissued in 2001 in DVD by Victory Records

=== Music videos ===
- "Blistered" (1997)
- "Through and Through" (1999)
- "Untitled" (1999)
- "Torn Apart" (2012)
- "Carry the Torch" (2013)

== Related bands ==
- Against the Wall - Mike Hartsfield
- Amendment Eighteen - Mike Hartsfield
- Berthold City - Andrew Kline
- Cross My Heart Hope To Die - Andrew Kline
- DJ Sid Vicious - Sid Niesen
- Drift Again - Mike Hartsfield
- Endswell - Mike Hartsfield
- Eyelid - Mike Machin
- Flashpoint - Chad J. Peterson
- Freewill - Mike Hartsfield
- Nineironspitfire - Chad J. Peterson
- Outspoken - Mike Hartsfield
- Solitude - Mike Hartsfield
- The Suppression Swing - Mike Hartsfield
- Turnedown - Andrew Kline
- World Be Free - Andrew Kline
