= Tales Don't Tell Themselves =

Studio album by Funeral for a Friend
- Released: 14 May 2007
- Genre: Alternative rock, post-hardcore
- Length: 40:50
- Label: Atlantic
- Producer: Gil Norton

Funeral for a Friend chronology
Hours (2005)	Tales Don't Tell Themselves (2007)	Memory and Humanity (2008)

Singles from Tales Don't Tell Themselves
- 1. "Into Oblivion (Reunion)" Released: 7 May 2007; 2. "Walk Away" Released: 23 July 2007

Tales Don't Tell Themselves is the third album by Welsh post-hardcore band Funeral for a Friend. It charted at #3 in the UK selling 25,000 copies in its first week and later went silver.

== Production ==
During the recording of the album, Matt Davies used the same microphone he used to record the group's first album Casually Dressed and Deep in Conversation and Ryan Richards recorded his drum parts by recording cymbals separately from the rest of his drum parts and replacing the normal cymbals with electric ones whilst recording basic drums. Davies plays guitar on several of the songs; this is the first album in which he has done so.

== Composition ==
Davies has mentioned that it is a concept album:

David is a Fisherman who is captain of a boat that regularly trawls the deep waters, he comes from a small fishing town on the coast where his wife Eleanor and daughter Isabelle await his return, but a huge storm is quickly approaching it hits the town and then batters David's boat and leaves him shipwrecked in the middle of the ocean as the only survivor. He spends days adrift going crazy and delirious wondering if he will ever see his family again, meanwhile the towns people fear that the fishermen are all dead, the coast guards rescue attempts have failed to recover any survivors. David becomes so delirious his life flashes before his eyes (he guides his younger self through his life as a blackbird) he eventually hits land and snaps out of his delusion. He is scared of the waters and the colossal waves and power that killed his crew but he decides that doing nothing to get back to Eleanor and Isabelle is a cowardly way out so he decides to build a small raft and brave the elements once again, this time he is found by a lifeboat and reunited with his family. The End. Basically, Cast Away meets The Perfect Storm, it has a lot to do with my own personal fears of the ocean and coming to terms with that through the story.

== Release ==
The album was released on 14 May 2007. Before the release of the album, the band released several short studio update videos informing fans of their progress. The album was released in Japan with two bonus tracks: "Rise and Fall" and "Crash and Burn (Home Demo)"; which were also sold as bonus tracks on iTunes.

On 13 February 2007, the band released the track "Out of Reach" as a taster for fans. The lead single from the album, "Into Oblivion (Reunion)", was released on 7 May 2007. The song was first played on The Zane Lowe rock show on 19 March and the official music video was uploaded to the band's MySpace page shortly after. "Into Oblivion (Reunion)" reached number 16 in the UK charts in its first week. It was nominated for the Kerrang! Award for Best Single. The song was once featured on Coronation Street, with David Platt sat in his car listening to the song.

According to Davies, speaking at a performance at Manchester's Apollo Theatre, the second single from the album is to be "Walk Away". It was released on 23 July 2007 and reached number 40 in the UK Charts. It was accompanied by a music video featuring a fisherman who goes missing. It follows his wife and daughter both breaking down. The video ends with the mother realising she cannot go on like this and trying to continue with her life. There are also scenes of Davies singing on a couch. The video featured actress Amanda Ryan and was filmed on location in the town of Whitstable on the north Kent coast in April 2007. The interior scenes were shot in another house on the seafront, not the house shown on the external shot. The video was played on 8 June 2007 on Kerrang! TV. The video concerns the missing fisherman around whom the album is based. It follows his wife and daughter both breaking down. The video ends with the mother realising she cannot go on like this and trying to continue with her life. There are also scenes of Davies singing on a couch. The video was added to the Kerrang! playlist.

== Reception ==
Professional ratings
Aggregate scores
Source	Rating
Metacritic	(52/100)
Review scores
Source	Rating
AbsolutePunk	(80%)
Allmusic	3.5/5 stars
NME	6/10 stars
Spin	2/5 stars
Exclaim.ca	(Mixed)

Tales Don't Tell Themselves received mixed reception from music critics. At Metacritic, which assigns a normalized rating out of 100 to reviews from mainstream critics, the album received an average score of 52, based on 6 reviews, which indicates "Mixed or average reviews".

== Track listing ==
No.	Title	Length
1.	"Into Oblivion (Reunion)"	4:25
2.	"The Great Wide Open"	3:32
3.	"The Diary"	3:40
4.	"On a Wire"	3:59
5.	"All Hands on Deck: Part 1: Raise the Sail"	3:26
6.	"All Hands on Deck: Part 2: Open Water"	3:48
7.	"Out of Reach"	3:34
8.	"One for the Road"	4:10
9.	"Walk Away"	3:48
10.	"The Sweetest Wave"	6:25
Total length:		40:50

iTunes and Japanese bonus tracks
No.	Title	Length
11.	"Rise and Fall"	3:27
12.	"Crash and Burn" (Home Demo)	4:21

== Charts ==
Chart performance for Tales Don't Tell Themselves
Chart (2007)	Peak position
Australian Albums (ARIA)	43
German Albums (Offizielle Top 100)	96
Irish Albums (IRMA)	27
Scottish Albums (OCC)	4
UK Albums (OCC)	3
UK Rock & Metal Albums (OCC)	2
US Billboard 200	135

=== Singles ===
"Into Oblivion (Reunion)"
Chart (2007)	Peak position
UK Singles (OCC)	16
UK Rock & Metal (OCC)	2

"Walk Away"
Chart (2007)	Peak position
UK Singles (OCC)	40
UK Rock & Metal (OCC)	1
