= Four Ways to Scream Your Name =

EP by Funeral for a Friend
- Released: 21 April 2003
- Recorded: Chapel Studios (Lincolnshire, England) in January and February 2003
- Genres: Post-hardcore, emo, screamo
- Length: 15:50
- Label: Infectious Records

Funeral for a Friend chronology
Between Order and Model (2002)	Four Ways to Scream Your Name (2003)	Casually Dressed & Deep in Conversation (2003)

Four Ways to Scream Your Name is the second EP by the Welsh post-hardcore band Funeral for a Friend. It was released on 21 April 2003, through Mighty Atom Records in the United Kingdom. It is currently out of print and highly sought after by fans of the band. This EP was released on both CD and 7" vinyl. Each version was limited to 1,000 copies. The vinyl edition is thought by many fans to be more valued than the CD due to its aesthetic quality: it is a double red gatefold vinyl. All of the tracks, excluding "She Drove Me to Daytime Television", were included on the band's 2003 US EP Seven Ways to Scream Your Name.

"She Drove Me to Daytime Television" and "Escape Artists Never Die" were later featured on the band's first album Casually Dressed & Deep in Conversation. Additionally, "This Years Most Open Heartbreak" and "Kiss and Makeup (All Bets Are Off)" appeared as bonus tracks on the album's Japanese Edition. All four reissued tracks are the same recordings as the EP except that they are mastered louder.

A promotional video was made for "This Year's Most Open Heartbreak".

== Track listing ==
No.	Title	Length
1.	"This Year's Most Open Heartbreak"	2:51
2.	"She Drove Me to Daytime Television"	3:36
3.	"Kiss and Makeup (All Bets Are Off)"	4:02
4.	"Escape Artists Never Die"	5:18
Total length:		15:50
