= Hours (Funeral for a Friend album) =

Studio album by Funeral for a Friend
- Released: 13 June 2005
- Recorded: Studio X and Studio Litho (Seattle, WA) from 12 January to 8 March 2005
- Genre: Post-hardcore; emo
- Length: 43:15
- Label: Atlantic
- Producer: Terry Date; Funeral for a Friend

Funeral for a Friend chronology
Seven Ways to Scream Your Name (2003)	Hours (2005)	Tales Don't Tell Themselves (2007)

Singles from Hours
- 1. "All The Rage" Released: 17 May 2005; 2. "Streetcar" Released: 28 May 2005; 3. "Monsters" Released: 14 August 2005; 4. "History" Released: 8 November 2005; 5. "Roses for the Dead" Released: 14 February 2006

Alternative cover
- The cover for the special edition version of Hours.

Hours is the second album by Welsh post-hardcore band Funeral for a Friend. The album was released on 13 June 2005, through record labels Atlantic and Ferret.

Four singles were released from the album: "Streetcar", "Monsters", "History" and "Roses for the Dead".

== Production ==
Hours was produced, recorded and mixed by Terry Date, with co-production by the band. Production took place in Seattle, Washington, with some of the album being recorded in Pearl Jam’s Studio Litho facilities. Several unorthodox approaches were taken during vocal tracking, including Date recording Davies-Kreye singing on a public street ("History") and in a moving vehicle ("Drive").

== Release ==
Professional ratings
Review scores
Source	Rating
AbsolutePunk	89%
AllMusic	3/5 stars
Kerrang!	4/5 stars
Rolling Stone	3.5/5 stars
NME	7/10 stars
Exclaim.ca	favourable

Hours was released on 13 June 2005. The album reached number 12 in the UK Albums Chart and was their first album to appear on the US Billboard 200, reaching number 139.

The album produced four singles: "Streetcar", "Monsters", "History", and "Roses for the Dead", all of which charted within the UK top 50.

The album has been released in four versions: Standard edition; special edition, with a bonus DVD containing interviews with the band and fans before the band's gig at the Give it a Name festival, and different cover; Japanese edition, with two bonus tracks; and limited Japanese edition with six bonus tracks.

== Track listing ==
All songs written by Funeral for a Friend

No.	Title	Length
1.	"All the Rage"	3:37
2.	"Streetcar"	3:37
3.	"Roses for the Dead"	4:06
4.	"Hospitality"	4:44
5.	"Drive"	5:06
6.	"Monsters"	3:29
7.	"History"	4:08
8.	"Recovery"	3:31
9.	"The End of Nothing"	3:19
10.	"Alvarez"	4:16
11.	"Sonny"	3:15
Total length:		43:15

Japanese bonus tracks
No.	Title	Length
12.	"Lazarus (In the Wilderness)"	2:50
13.	"I am the Arsonist"	4:55

Limited edition Japanese bonus tracks
No.	Title	Length
14.	"Babylon's Burning" (The Ruts cover)	2:31
15.	"Sunday Bloody Sunday" (U2 cover)	4:23
16.	"The Boys Are Back in Town" (Thin Lizzy cover)	4:19
17.	"Pirate Song" (Gameface cover)	3:46

== Personnel ==
Funeral for a Friend

- Kris Coombs-Roberts - guitar, backing vocals
- Gareth Davies - bass guitar, backing vocals
- Matt Davies - lead vocals
- Ryan Richards - drums
- Darran Smith - guitar

Additional personnel

- Co-produced by Funeral for a Friend
- Manda Maskens - speech vocals on "Streetcar"
- Storme, Lisa and Joel - speech vocals on "Streetcar"
- Brian Valentino - additional vocals on "History"
- Josh Evans - addition vocals on "History"
- Terry Date - production, recording, mixing
- Sam Hofstedt - assisted engineering at Studio X
- Floyd Reitsma - assisted engineering at Studio Litho
- Junichi Murakawa - mixing at Bay 7, Los Angeles, California
- Ted Jensen - mastering at Sterling Sound, New York City
- John Mitchell - recording of phone vocals at Outhouse Studios, Reading, Berkshire

== Charts ==
=== Album ===
Chart performance for Hours
Chart (2005)	Peak position
Australian Albums (ARIA)	85
Irish Albums (IRMA)	23
Scottish Albums (OCC)	82
UK Albums (OCC)	12
UK Rock & Metal Albums (OCC)	4
US Billboard 200	139

=== Singles ===
Year	Song title	Chart positions
Year	Song title	UK Singles
2005	"Streetcar"	15
2005	"Monsters"	36
2005	"History"	21
2006	"Roses for the Dead"	39

== Certifications ==
Certifications for Hours
Region	Certification	Certified units/sales
United Kingdom (BPI)	Gold	100,000^{^}
^{^} Shipments figures based on certification alone.
