= Funeral for a Friend =

Welsh post-hardcore band

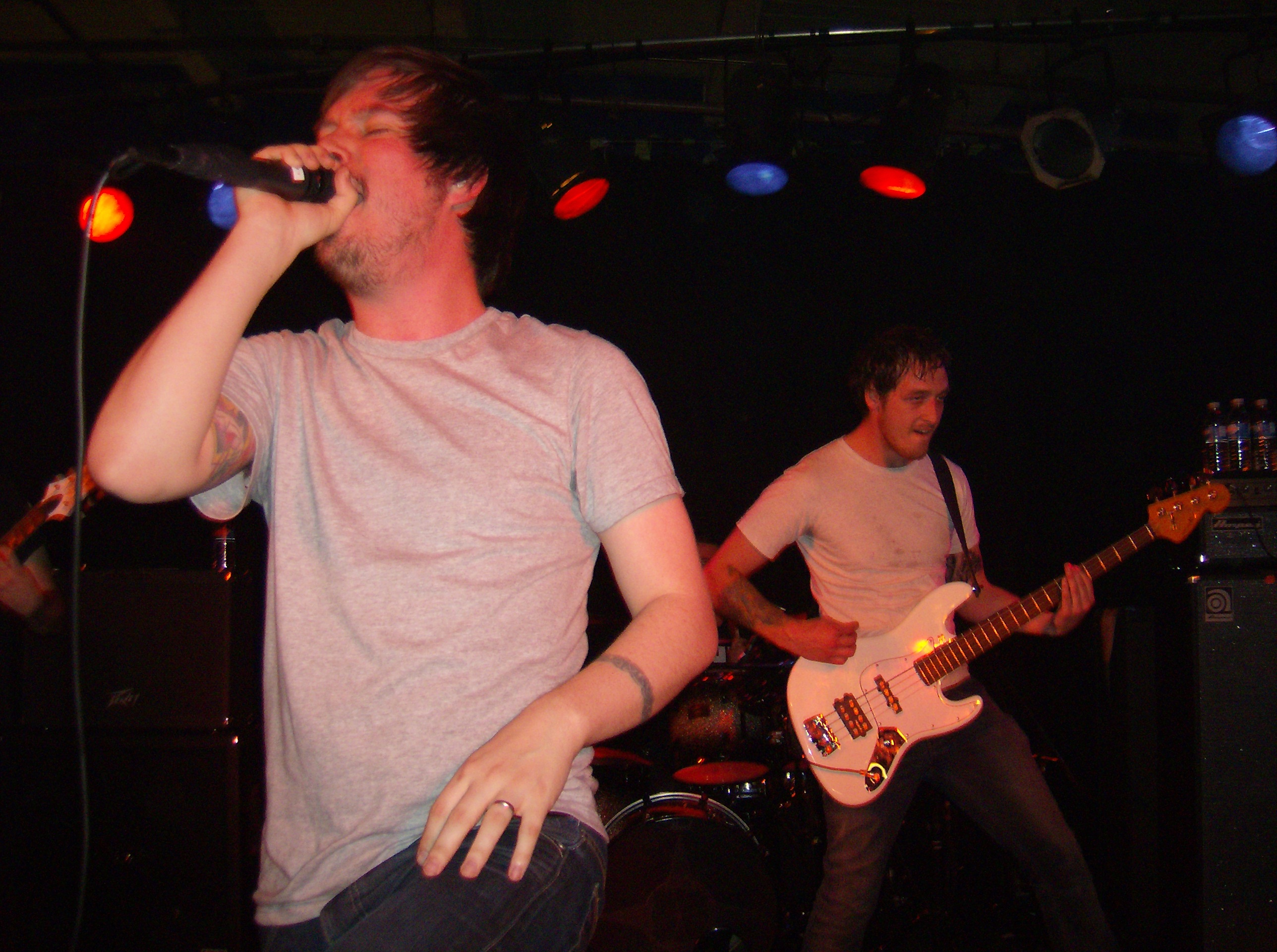
- Funeral for a Friend performing in Detroit in 2009. Pictured are Matthew Davies-Kreye and Gavin Burrough.

Background information
- Origin: Bridgend, Wales
- Genres: Post-hardcore; emo; melodic hardcore
- Years active: 2001–2016, 2019–present
- Labels: Distiller, No Sleep, End Hits, Good Fight, Mighty Atom, Infectious, Atlantic, Ferret, Join Us, Roadrunner
- Formerly of: Hondo Maclean, Desecration, Rise to Remain, The Secret Show, Ghostlines, Extreme Noise Terror, Goodtime Boys, Suns Of Thunder
- Members: Kris Roberts; Gavin Burrough; Darran Smith; Richard Boucher; Ryan Richards
- Past members: Matthew Davies-Kreye; Gareth Davies; Kerry Roberts; Matthew Evans; Andi Morris; Johnny Phillips; Pat Lundy
- Website: www.funeralforafriend.co.uk

Funeral for a Friend is a Welsh post-hardcore band from Bridgend, formed in 2001. The band's members are Kris Roberts (guitar, backing vocals), Gavin Burrough (guitar, vocals), Darran Smith (guitar), Richard Boucher (bass), and Ryan Richards (drums, vocals).

Funeral for a Friend's popularity rose in the United Kingdom with the release of their debut album, Casually Dressed & Deep in Conversation (2003). Achieving both a gold certification and three top-twenty singles in their home country, Casually Dressed & Deep in Conversation is often acclaimed as one of the landmark emo records of the 2000s. Hours (2005) featured a similar musical style to their debut, but also showcased more melodic sensibilities, and Tales Don't Tell Themselves (2007) showed an evolution in Funeral for a Friend's musical style from that which defined their debut, as the group began to diverge from their use of screaming vocals and post-hardcore-influenced guitars, favoring a more melodic rock influence. These albums achieved gold and silver sales certificates respectively in the UK.

Funeral for a Friend self-released their fourth album, Memory and Humanity (2008) through their short-lived record label Join Us, the album arguably being their most eclectic to date. Following this the band tied themselves to other independent labels for Welcome Home Armageddon (2011) Conduit (2013), and Chapter and Verse (2015), which showed the band returning to the heavier style of their earlier work. In September 2015, they announced their break-up and final tour in 2016. On 21 May 2016, they played their last performance to a sold-out Forum in London.

In October 2019, Funeral for a Friend reunited as a live band, initially for three benefit shows - two in Cardiff at the Cardiff University Student Union followed by one in London at Shepherd's Bush Empire. Following a planned performance at the canceled 2020 Download Festival, they announced a headline UK tour for April 2021 playing songs from their first three albums. In December 2023 the band announced they would be returning to recording music, but without founding vocalist Matthew Davies-Kreye.

== History ==
=== Formation and early years (2001–2003) ===
because when we started out we didn't think we'd reach the level we've reached. It was basically just something to call the band, as we figured we'd just play a couple of shows and then that would be it and even then it isn't that important. A band makes a name, a name doesn't make a band. So no, there's not really anything more to it than the song.

— drummer Ryan Richards in an interview in 2007

When Michael Davies, one of January Thirst's original vocalists, quit in December 2001, Matthew Evans (vocals) and Johnny Phillips (drums) invited Matt Davies (later Davies-Kreye) to try out for the vacated singer position. Soon afterward, the band reformed as Funeral for a Friend; the name is derived from a song by Planes Mistaken for Stars, one of Davies' favourite bands at the time.

During the start of the New Year they parted ways with second guitarist Kerry Roberts (Kris Roberts's brother) and found a suitable replacement in Darran Smith (ex-Tripcage). The band recorded four tracks at Mighty Atom Studios for a proposed self-financed EP with another Welsh band From This Moment On. Upon hearing the tracks, Mighty Atom Records approached the band and offered a two-album deal, resulting in their debut EP, Between Order and Model (2002). Before the EP's release, Andi Morris (bass) quit to join death metal band Amputated, with Phillips and Evans also leaving. The band then recruited Gareth Davies (later Ellis-Davies) on bass and Ryan Richards on drums. Matt Davies became the band's only primary vocalist, with Gareth Davies performing backing melodies and Richards taking over Evans' screaming role.

In 2003, Funeral for a Friend recorded their second EP, Four Ways to Scream Your Name, produced and mixed by Colin Richardson. In mid-2003, the band secured their first Kerrang! award, winning the award for "Best UK Newcomer", beating The Darkness, who won in all other nominated categories. Funeral for a Friend's win was largely attributed to their fervent fan base, as the awards winner was decided by public vote online at the official Kerrang! Web site. In August 2003, Funeral for a Friend opened the Concrete Jungle stage at the Reading and Leeds Festivals.

=== Major record label years and international success (2003–2009) ===
==== Casually Dressed & Deep in Conversation ====
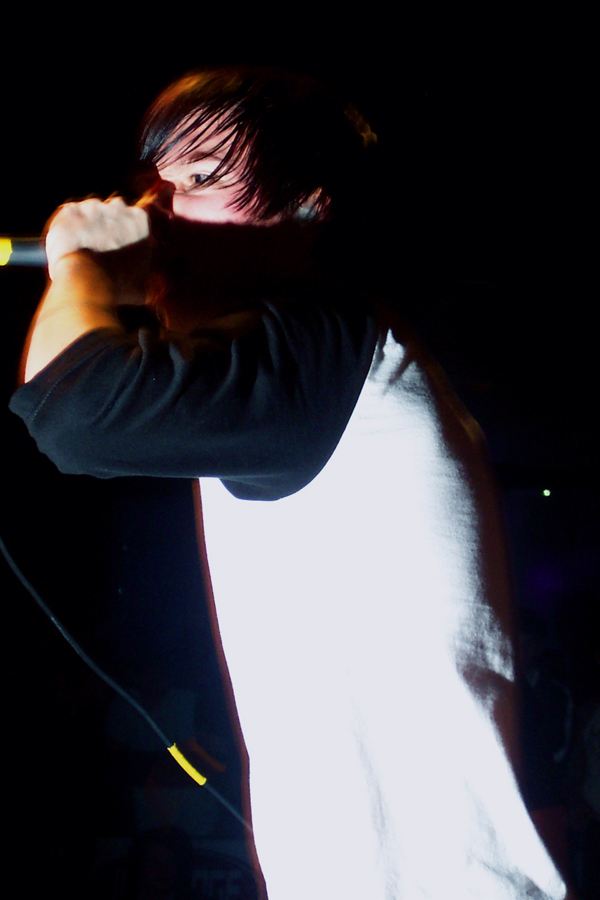
Matthew Davies performing with Funeral for a Friend in 2004.

On 21 August 2003, Funeral for a Friend were awarded a Kerrang! Award for "Best British Newcomer". On 20 October 2003, after recording for the duration of the summer, Funeral for a Friend's full-length debut album was released. Casually Dressed & Deep in Conversation, produced and mixed by Colin Richardson, was released to critical acclaim in the UK. The album did not see a concurrent release in the US (though it eventually released there on 13 July 2004); instead, a seven-track "mini-album", entitled Seven Ways to Scream Your Name, was released, and featured songs from the band's Between Order & Model and Four Ways to Scream Your Name EPs plus Juneau B Side "The Getaway Plan". In the United Kingdom the album received a Gold certification a year after its release on 29 October 2004, which was achieved with a sales figure of over 100,000.

Casually Dressed & Deep in Conversation saw three top-twenty singles including "Juneau" (#19), "She Drove Me to Daytime Television" (#20) and "Escape Artists Never Die" (#19). Funeral for a Friend toured extensively to promote Casually Dressed & Deep in Conversation, including a series of European dates in which they opened for Iron Maiden. This was met with a mixed reception, as their style and fan base bore little resemblance to the heavy metal background of Iron Maiden.

The band joined Avenged Sevenfold, My Chemical Romance and Moments in Grace for an American tour spanning 17-23 April 2004. Coinciding with their shows together, Funeral for a Friend and Moments in Grace teamed up for a split 7-inch vinyl, co-released through Atlantic Records, Salad Days Records, Mighty Atom Records and Infectious Records, on 20 April 2004. Funeral for a Friend contributed the song "Bullet Theory" (previously-released in the UK but then-unreleased in the US). In promotion of the split 7-inch vinyl, webzine Ultimate Guitar held a giveaway contest for five winners to receive a record and a signed poster. Also in 2004, Funeral for a Friend supported Linkin Park throughout America and headlined the second stage of the Reading and Leeds Festivals.

==== Hours ====
In May 2005, the first single from the upcoming second album "Streetcar" acted as the band's fourth consecutive top 20 single in the United Kingdom by debuting at number 15. On 14 June 2005, the band released their second album Hours through Atlantic Records. Produced by Terry Date, the album was recorded in two Seattle studios owned by the grunge band Pearl Jam and featured unusual methods of recording, for example Matt Davies' vocals were recorded whilst in a moving car and on a crowded Seattle street, for the song "Drive". Just two weeks after its release the album was certified a Silver over 60,000 sales and was awarded a Gold for over 100,000 sales on 23 December 2005. In August of the same year, the band won a Kerrang! Award for "Best British Band".

Funeral for a Friend performed several low-profile shows in Wales, including Bangor University and Bridgend Recreation Centre, prior to the release of Hours. In the United States, they played alongside bands such as Atreyu, Saosin, Hawthorne Heights and Thrice on the Maurice Stage of the 2005 Vans Warped Tour. The band headlined the British leg of Taste of Chaos across November with support from The Used, Killswitch Engage, Rise Against and Story of the Year. Funeral for a Friend released the third and last single from Hours, "History", which music video depicts the events of the miner strikes of the mid-1980s in South Wales.

Funeral For a Friend closed the promotional activity for Hours in the Summer of 2006, with a series of UK shows rescheduled from February. Most of the original dates had been cancelled because Matt Davies had suffered from a bout of laryngitis. Several other shows were scheduled in the UK to complement these rescheduled dates, and the tour culminated in a slot below headliners Guns N' Roses at the Download Festival at Donington Park. The rest of 2006 was spent writing and recording the band's third album.

==== Tales Don't Tell Themselves ====
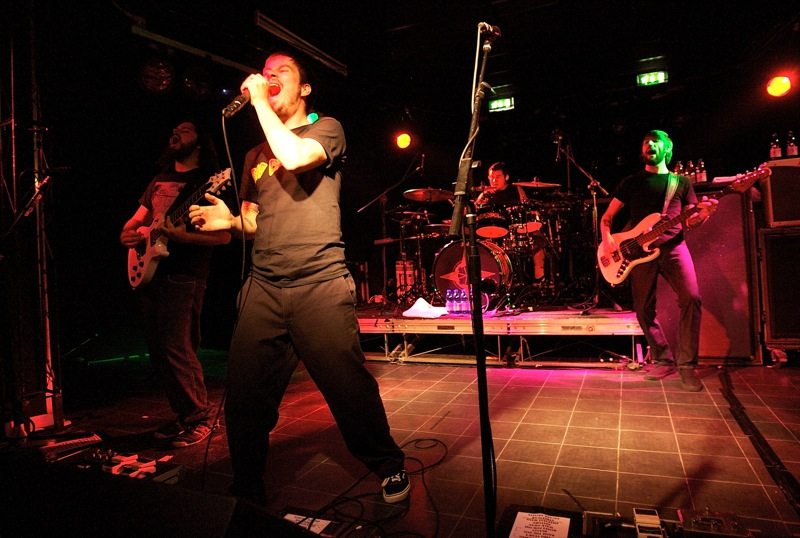
Guitarist Kris Roberts (left), former vocalist Matthew Davies-Kreye (front), drummer Ryan Richards (background) and former bassist Gareth Davies (right) performing in 2007

Funeral for a Friend mentioned the writing of this album during their UK shows in summer 2006 and they started writing and recording at the end of the tour. Tales Don't Tell Themselves was released on 14 May 2007 in the UK, having been leaked to the internet on 10 May 2007. The band released video diary updates of the recording on their MySpace page. On 19 March 2007, "Into Oblivion (Reunion)", the first single from the album, premiered on the Zane Lowe Show on Radio One. It was given a 7 May physical release, and the video can be seen and the song heard on their MySpace. It reached number 39 in its first week of release on downloads and reached number 16 in the Official UK chart on 13 May 2007.

A selection of intimate shows to promote the album were played on 12, 13 and 14 April 2007 in intimate coastal venues in the south of England. Only 200 tickets were available for each show and these had to be applied for via an e-mail sent to members of the FFAF mailing list. Names were then picked out of a hat and the selected people were offered the opportunity to buy a pair of tickets to the gig, exclusive T-shirts were given to anyone paying using PayPal mobile. On 8 May 2007 the band released Tales Don't Tell Themselves in its entirety for fans to preview via their MySpace page. This album is the first on which Matt plays guitar. On 10 May 2007 the band played another intimate gig for Kerrang! 105.2 at the Wolverhampton Civic Hall Bar, in which they played "Walk Away" for the very first time. This is one of the tracks which Matt plays guitar on live, alongside "Raise The Sail" and "The Sweetest Wave", which were debuted on the full tour in May 2007. The album was their highest charting yet, reaching Number 3 in the UK Album Charts.

On 16 July 2007, "Walk Away", was released as the second single from Tales Don't Tell Themselves and reached number 40 in the UK singles charts. It was announced in a newsletter that "The Great Wide Open" would be the next single and would be released as an EP. The EP, The Great Wide Open was released on 15 October 2007 through Atlantic Records, negating the release of the single itself.

==== Memory and Humanity and Your History Is Mine ====
On 26 January 2008, drummer Ryan Richards made an announcement on the band's forum, stating that FFAF were to spend the first few months of the year recording, with a view of releasing a four or five track EP in March or April 2008. After writing more material than originally planned, the band decided to scrap plans for the EP and released a full-length album instead. Ryan also announced that the new album would contain screaming vocals, riffs and would be closer to Casually Dressed & Deep in Conversation than any of their other albums, although would still be significantly different and more technical, citing that they want to move forward, and never back to any old style.

On 11 May 2008, it was announced via a MySpace bulletin that the band would be shooting a video for the first single from the album, "Waterfront Dance Club", on 17 May. "Waterfront Dance Club" was played exclusively for the first time on Radio 1's Rock Show on 2 June 2008, where it was also announced that the single would be released as a double A-side with the track "Beneath the Burning Tree". Both singles were also released as a limited edition 7-inch on the same date. The album's title was confirmed as Memory and Humanity by Rock Sound magazine on 30 June 2008, and that its release would take place in October 2008. On 2 July 2008, the band announced the UK tour of Memory and Humanity, commencing 14 October 2008.

9 August 2008 saw the debut of the video for the single "Kicking and Screaming" on MySpace. Later that month on the 27th, it was announced that the band had licensed their new record to Victory Records for the U.S. and Canadian releases. The album was released via the label on 28 October 2008. It was also released via Roadrunner Records in the rest of the world, apart from the UK, where it was released through the band's own label, Join Us. The release was followed by a tour in Britain, Ireland and northern Europe, supported by Canadian hardcore punk act Cancer Bats.

On 4 September 2008, it was announced via a MySpace blog post that Gareth Davies had left the band, to be replaced by Gavin Burrough (Hondo Maclean, Ghostlines, The Future). "As some of you may know, Gareth has been living in America for the past couple of years, and recently got married. Ultimately, the strain of travelling between continents has taken its toll and Gareth made the decision that it would be in the best interests of himself, his family and Funeral to leave the band. We totally respect and understand his choice, wish him all the best in his future and we thank him for being part of our lives for the past 6 years." The first interview to surface with Burrough in the band appeared on the Rocklouder webzine in the week of the Memory and Humanity release. In the 24 January 2009 issue of Kerrang! magazine, it was stated that the band were currently filming the video for the third single off the album, Rules and Games. The single was released on 23 March 2009. They will also be going on tour with We Are the Ocean supporting to coincide with its release.

It was initially revealed in Kerrang! magazine on 24 June 2009 that the band were to release a greatest hits album, entitled Your History Is Mine: 2002-2009 on 28 September 2009. The compilation album was released by Atlantic Records because the record deal between the band and the label allowed the Atlantic Records to release a compilation CD at any point in the band's career. The band then decided to record four brand new tracks in order to give the release value to fans. On 21 July 2009, "Wrench", one of the new songs, premiered on Radio One's Rock Show with Dan Carter. Zane Lowe credited them as "one of the best British bands of the last decade" upon the release of Your History Is Mine.

=== Independent years (2010–2016) ===
==== Break from Atlantic Records and Welcome Home Armageddon ====
On 23 April 2010, Funeral for a Friend announced on Facebook that guitarist Darran Smith would be leaving the band, but not before playing his final shows. He wrote a farewell message on the band's website. On 26 April 2010, Funeral for a Friend wrote on their forum about their line-up change, paying homage to the departure of their friend Darran Smith, but also announcing the new member. Gavin Burrough changed instrument from bass to guitar, taking over Darran's place as guitarist, Kris Roberts would take over his role as backing vocalist, and the new bassist of Funeral for a Friend will be Richard Boucher (Hondo Maclean, Hurricane-Joe, Ghostlines). The band noted: "He's SO good on bass that we let someone with blonde hair join our band. That ought to be an indication of how great he is." The band stated that they are excited for the new material being made and can't wait to show the fans what they have: "The creative well, is well and truly overflowing. Exciting times. Stay tuned, and be ready."

On 3 May 2010, the band announced that they will be releasing a special new EP to fans who "pledged" through website pledgemusic.com, the "pledge" options include the EP, a signed EP and even an acoustic performance by the band at a fan's residence. On 1 July 2010, the band revealed that the EP will titled The Young and Defenceless and also revealed the cover art. It was also announced via Kerrang! that the newly recorded EP would be released on 1 September 2010; however, in actuality, the downloadable version was released on 6 September 2010 with the physical copies being planned on being released sometime in the third week of October. On 9 November, Funeral For a Friend released a music video for the track "Serpents in Solitude". Towards the end of October 2010 they finished a session of recording for a new album for which a name and date were yet to be announced. On 2 November, they played two new songs, confirmed to be on this album (which was announced as due for release in March 2011), called "Man Alive" and "Front Row Seats to the End of the World". Another song title was confirmed as "Spinning Over the Island".

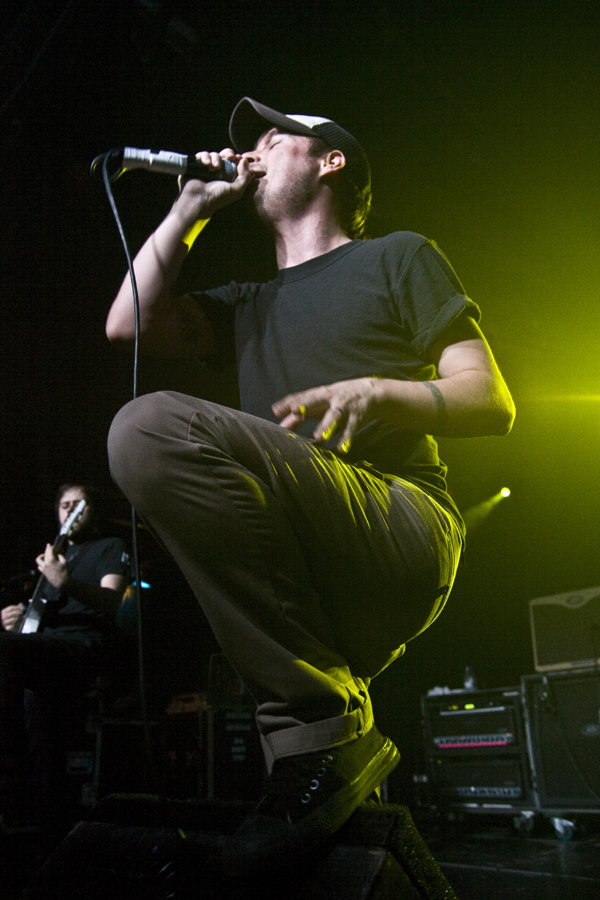
Davies-Kreye performing with the band in 2011

On 10 January 2011, the band released the official video for the album's leading single "Front Row Seats to the End of the World" and announced their fifth studio album would be called Welcome Home Armageddon. On 17 January, they released the album's artwork and track list On 24 January, it was announced that the album was to be released by Good Fight Music, a move that would reconnect the band with the original label team that released Seven Ways to Scream Your Name and Casually Dressed & Deep in Conversation. On 9 February, the band released the video for their newest single, "Sixteen". On 5 March 2011, the band played their first ever show in South Africa, at the RAMFest in Worcester, outside of Cape Town alongside Alkaline Trio and Die Antwoord. They concluded their South African tour by playing in Durban and Johannesburg on 9 and 12 March 2011 respectively.

Welcome Home Armageddon was released 14 March 2011 in Britain through Distiller Records and 15 March in the United States through Good Fight and later on distributed through Roadrunner to the rest of the world. It was announced as a nomination for an inaugural Welsh Music Prize however lost to Gruff Rhys' Hotel Shampoo.

On 28 September 2011, Funeral for a Friend announced the release of a new extended play to be released in November. The EP is titled See You All in Hell and it will feature only one brand new track while the remainder of the tracks are acoustic, live session recordings and remixes of tracks from Welcome Home Armageddon as well as a cover of a Strife song. The band has expressed an eagerness to return to the studio and write the follow-up to Welcome Home Armageddon and they describe "High Castles" as being a "good indication of where we'll be taking things on the next record." The release of the EP is accompanied by a UK tour by the band in October with support from Escape The Fate, The Amity Affliction, The Bunny The Bear and Straight Lines. On 13 October 2011, Funeral for a Friend released a new digital single from the EP titled "High Castles", the only original track from the EP. See You All in Hell was released on 7 November.

==== Conduit and departure of Ryan Richards ====
On 22 May 2012, Ryan Richards announced that he was leaving the band. He cited his family as the reason, saying: "I've always put music first in my life - but the time has come now for my family to take the top spot." Pat Lundy replaced Richards in the band full-time, after initial discussions over joining as a touring member. Lundy is the former drummer of London-based heavy metal band Rise to Remain, having left the band in January 2012. After being contacted by the band to come to audition in Cardiff for the role, Pat learned their whole setlist in seven days for the audition. Whilst the line up change occurred the band was recording and mixing their follow-up to their fifth studio album. Across the year the band made few live appearances as they were working on the album, performing at Wakestock in North Wales, both the northern and southern dates of Slam Dunk Festival 2012 and the UK Warped Tour festival at the Alexandra Palace in London on 10 November 2012.

Five people on a stage, a conduit for the message and the music, delivering that to people who want to listen in, be a part of whatever it is that we're doing and being involved. It's purely about delivering the message. After 10 years of being a band, we see how much what we've done has effected people who care about our stuff. Whether it's lyrics or whatever, these songs transcend us and become something more to a lot more people.

— Matthew Davies-Kreye in a press release for the sixth album in 2012.

Funeral for a Friend spent all of 2012, bar their brief festival appearances, writing and recording for their sixth studio album. Over the year they released several studio updates showing the band members tracking different instruments for the album. On 4 October of that year the band confirmed the title and release date of their sixth album Conduit for a 28 January 2013 release in the United Kingdom and on 5 February 2013 through The End Records In the United States. To support the release of the album, the band underwent a headlining tour with support acts such as Such Gold, Daytrader and I Divide throughout January and February. However, Daytrader had to pull out of the tour, so Major League took their place on the bill. The band continues to work with Welsh music producer, Romesh Dodangoda, on the album as they did with their previous album. Vocalist Matthew Davies-Kreye spoke of their working union, "To me, he gets our individual personalities and works his magic with each of us, making sure that we're all comfortable with what we have to do for the record." Davies-Kreye has described the reasoning behind the title Conduit as "the experiences of being in a band" and summarised the album's style as "a post-hardcore record that is not afraid to drop into some hardcore for good measure." The first single from the album, "Best Friends and Hospital Beds", would be released on 12 November with the music video being released prior on 10 October.

After its first week of release in the United Kingdom, Conduit debuted at number 34 on the official UK album charts. Funeral for a Friend completed a 10-date Australian tour in May, which will mark the band's most extensive yet in the country. Later in 2013, the band released a remastered edition of the Between Order and Model EP on End Hits Records, complete with some previously unreleased tracks and live versions of the EP tracks.

In April 2014, they toured the UK and Europe playing Hours in its entirety. During these shows, they also performed a new song titled "1%" from their forthcoming seventh album.

==== Chapter and Verse and breakup ====
On 28 September 2014, Funeral for a Friend debuted the lead single from their forthcoming album Chapter and Verse, titled "You've Got a Bad Case of the Religions" on the Rock Show on BBC Radio 1. The band then announced the album's release date of 19 January 2015 as well as a UK/European Tour in support of the album. Chapter and Verse was recorded in just under two weeks, at The Ranch, Southampton; the record was produced by Lewis Johns. They also announced that Pat Lundy had left the band to focus on his new band Modestep, and that Goodtime Boys drummer Casey McHale would be their live/touring drummer, but they weren't looking for a replacement full-time drummer. Prior to the album's release, music videos were released for both "1%" and "Pencil Pusher". In June, they released Hours - Live at Islington Academy, a live DVD of their show at O2 Academy Islington in April 2014 where they played Hours in full. The DVD also came with a CD or vinyl record of the show. Also around this time, they recorded a cover of "I Can Climb Mountains" by Hell Is For Heroes for Worship and Tributes, a compilation CD included with Rock Sound magazine's 200th issue, which ended up being the band's final recording. They were the only band who recorded a cover for the compilation who had one of their own songs covered on the same compilation, with Pop Punk band Neck Deep covering "Juneau".

On 14 September 2015, Funeral for a Friend announced their breakup and the 'Last Chance to Dance' final tour across Australia, Germany and the UK, which spanned from February to April 2016; they played two subsequent nights on each stop of the tour, performing Hours and Casually Dressed & Deep in Conversation in their entirety (alongside other songs) on the first and second night respectively. In October 2015, the band announced American metalcore band Shai Hulud would support them on their final tour, with Zoax being announced as the opening band in December. In late February, the band announced the London shows originally scheduled for 15 and 16 April at Shepherd's Bush Empire would instead take place on 20 and 21 May 2016 at the O2 Forum in Kentish Town due to structural issues at the original venue which caused many gigs to be cancelled/moved to other dates. Due to Shai Hulud being unable to make the rearranged dates, Raging Speedhorn and Creeper played as the main support bands on 20 and 21 May respectively. Their final performance was on 21 May.

=== Reunion (2019–present) ===
==== Live shows ====
In August 2019, Funeral for a Friend announced two special reunion concerts, with the proceedings going to the family of Stuart "Big Stu" Brothers -the terminally ill former webmaster of their official site. Two shows were set to be on 28 and 29 October at The Globe in Cardiff and O2 Shepherd's Bush Empire in London. As well as members Matt Davies-Kreye, Kris Roberts, Gav Burrough, and Richard Boucher, the band was joined by former guitarist Darran Smith and drummer/screamer Ryan Richards. After the initial two dates sold out quickly, the Cardiff show was upgraded from The Globe to the Cardiff Student Union, and a second Cardiff date was added for 27 October.

On 27 January 2020, Download festival announced their upcoming performance as part of the 2020 lineup. The festival would be cancelled in April, however, due to the COVID-19 pandemic in the United Kingdom. In September 2021, the band were a late addition to Slam Dunk festival. In July 2020, the band announced that they would be touring the UK in April 2021 playing songs from Casually-dressed & deep in Conversation, Hours, and Tales don't tell themselves, also due to COVID-19 the tour dates were postponed, taking place in early March 2022. After the initial dates sold out, the band added two additional dates in Cardiff and London and upgraded the venues for Manchester and Glasgow, which was then followed up with four additional dates in Leeds, Bristol, and Bournemouth alongside a third London date at Shepherd's Bush Empire. Due to illness, Richard Boucher was replaced on bass for the last 4 shows by the band's guitar-tech Steve Nash.

In March 2023, the band announced that they would tour the UK to celebrate the 20th anniversary of ‘casually dressed…’ with special guests Dashboard Confessional as the supporting act. Tickets went on sale in March 2023 with dates for the tour scheduled to kick off at the Manchester O2 on 7 October 2023 and finishing at London’s Roundhouse on 15 October 2023.

The tour would prove to be the last with Matt Davies-Kreye as lead vocalist leaving Kris Roberts as the only original member of the 2001 lineup.

==== Return to recording music and Davies-Kreye's departure ====
On 4 December 2023, Funeral for a Friend announced that they would be recording new music, but Matthew Davies-Kreye had decided not to commit to their future plans and had therefore left the band. Lucas Woodland, the vocalist for Holding Absence, performed with the band at Slam Dunk Festival 2024, Download Festival 2024, Rock the Castle on 19 July 2025 in Cardiff Castle, and 2000 Trees Festival on 10 July 2026.

== Musical style and influences ==
Funeral for a Friend's music has been described variously as post-hardcore, emo, melodic hardcore, screamo, and pop screamo. Guitarist Gavin Burrough describes the band's style as eclectic, based on each members individual influences and summarising Funeral for a Friend's style by pointing out "there's a definite melancholy feel to our tracks[...] We can punish you with our metallic, angular riffs, and also seduce you with our serene melodies." Their influences include Boysetsfire, Shai Hulud, Glassjaw, Poison the Well, Thursday, Manic Street Preachers, Far, Texas is the Reason, Onelinedrawing, Lifetime, Quicksand, the Movielife, Helmet, the Haunted, At the Gates, Vision of Disorder, Refused, Lostprophets, Pantera, Smashing Pumpkins, Stampin' Ground, Iron Maiden, Metallica, Sepultura, Pearl Jam, Earthtone9, Deadguy, Kiss It Goodbye, and Drowningman. Regarding the "emo" label, drummer Ryan Richards has said "I have no more problem with being called emo than with being called metal or hardcore, I just don't think any one term or label does justice to the music we do."

Their earlier EPs and their debut album Casually Dressed & Deep in Conversation were considered their heaviest work for some time, as their subsequent material used less aggressive vocals and instrumentation; however, recent years have seen a resurgence of such elements and a higher number of 'heavy' songs. "tour de force of audience-friendly post-hardcore". Their second album Hours is seen as being a part of the new wave of emo that occurred during the mid-2000s. Songs on Hours were seen as the band "transcending their genre limitations", including "History" which combines "melodic interplay and sincere lyricism".

While their next two albums followed a different musical direction. With Tales Don't Tell Themselves they use a more alternative rock and post-hardcore style with classic rock, alternative country and 1980s heartland rock influences. The album uses choral elements for tracks like "Into Oblivion (Reunion)". Their 4th album, Memory and Humanity returned to a more post-hardcore sound however adopted a more alternative rock influence, incorporating an emo influence with an anthemic rock uplift.

All subsequent material following the band's extended play, The Young & Defenceless saw them returning to a more aggressive elements of their post-hardcore style. Burrough saw it as a capturing of energy that their previous two albums lacked and so wanted to write music more "direct and in your face." In the band's opinion they had always wanted to return to their hardcore punk roots. However, it has also been noted that Welcome Home Armageddon incorporates more pop rock inspired hooks and melodies, the album's more melodic approach is credited in songs like "Old Hymns". The band and critics alike have said that because they released the two on indie labels they had more creative freedom from when they were signed to Atlantic Records. When Welcome Home Armageddon came out, critics were quick to compare and contrast it to Casually Dressed & Deep in Conversation.

Their final album Chapter and Verse was described by Drowned in Sound writer Gareth O'Malley as being "cut from similar cloth to its predecessor".

=== Lyrical themes ===
Funeral for a Friend's lyrical themes, primarily written by Davies-Kreye, center around personal and emotional experiences. The first album Casually Dressed and Deep in Conversation was focused on a disintegrating relationship, while the second album Hours was more "extroverted" in its direction, additionally discussing "war, fiscal abuse, alcohol abuse, people not giving a shit".

== Legacy and impact ==
Funeral for a Friend has been said to be a prominent influence on the British post-hardcore scene, primarily with their debut album Casually Dressed & Deep in Conversation, a release which is believed by some to have set a high standard for the band to rival in future releases. James Ding of AbsolutePunk stated that: "...the album still stands tall atop of many recent releases due to the quality of the music on offer, and even though FFAF may have strayed from the style that started their career, this is still a landmark album in modern British rock music". In April 2011, Rock Sound magazine inducted Casually Dressed & Deep in Conversation into Rock Sound's Hall of Fame, crediting the album as an influence on albums by bands such as Fightstar, The Blackout, Kids in Glass Houses, We Are the Ocean, Blood Youth, and Bring Me the Horizon have cited their work as an influence.

== Members ==
Current members

- Kris Roberts – lead guitar (2001–2016, 2019–present), rhythm guitar (2001–2010), backing vocals (2005–2016, 2019–present)
- Darran Smith – rhythm and lead guitar (2002–2010, 2019–present)
- Ryan Richards – drums, percussion, unclean vocals (2002–2012, 2019–present)
- Gavin Burrough – rhythm guitar (2010–2016, 2019–present), backing vocals (2008–2016, 2019–present), bass (2008–2010)
- Richard Boucher – bass (2010–2016, 2019–present)

Current live members

- Lucas Woodland – lead vocals (2024–present)

Past members

- Matthew Davies-Kreye – lead vocals (2001–2016, 2019–2023)
- Gareth Davies – bass, backing vocals (2002–2008)
- Kerry Roberts – rhythm and lead guitar (2001–2002)
- Matthew Evans – unclean vocals (2001–2002)
- Andi Morris – bass (2001–2002)
- Johnny Phillips – drums (2001–2002)
- Pat Lundy – drums, percussion (2012–2014)

Past touring members

- Casey McHale – drums (touring 2014–2016)

== Discography ==
Studio albums

- Casually Dressed & Deep in Conversation (2003)
- Hours (2005)
- Tales Don't Tell Themselves (2007)
- Memory and Humanity (2008)
- Welcome Home Armageddon (2011)
- Conduit (2013)
- Chapter and Verse (2015)
