= Mighty Atom Records =

Welsh-based record label

Mighty Atom Records is a Welsh-based record label. The company was formed in early 2000 by Dave Simpson and Roger Hopkins. It is known for having been one of a few independent record labels at the forefront of the UK emo scene in the early 2000s, due to its early involvement with Funeral for a Friend.

It operates out of the former BBC buildings in Swansea, Wales.

The label ran into financial difficulties as the years progressed and although still a functioning label, have not released any material since Brigade in 2006. The Mighty Atom recording facility 'Mighty Atom Studios' still operates out of Wales, and has recorded the majority of the bands and records released on the label.

== Roster ==
Notable bands on its past and present roster include:

- Funeral for a Friend
- 3 Colours Red
- Hondo Maclean
- Brigade
- Aconite Thrill
- The Lucky Nine
- Liberty 37
- Goatboy
- Days in December
- Electric Eel Shock

== See also ==
- List of record labels
