= These Days Will Fade =

2003 extended play by Moments in Grace

EP by Moments in Grace
- Released: December 12, 2003
- Recorded: June 2003 – November 2003
- Studios: Salad Days, Beltsville, Maryland; Soundtracks, New York, New York
- Genres: Alternative rock; post-hardcore
- Length: 14:23
- Labels: Atlantic; Salad Days
- Producer: Brian McTernan

Moments in Grace chronology
Postcard Audio (2002)	These Days Will Fade (2003)	Funeral for a Friend / Moments in Grace (2004)

These Days Will Fade is an extended play by American alternative rock / post-hardcore band Moments in Grace. It is the band's second release, following Postcard Audio's eponymous extended play released in 2002, but the first to be released after changing their name to Moments in Grace. The extended play was first released as a free download by American record label Salad Days Records on December 12, 2003. It was later re-issued digitally and on compact disc by Atlantic Records and Salad Days Records on March 23, 2004. The release includes the song "Stratus", which was later pushed as a single to radio stations in June 2004, and its music video was released to music television channels in August 2004.

The extended play was intended as a teaser for the band's forthcoming full-length album Moonlight Survived, its material having been written at the same time from mid-2002 to mid-2003, while the band was still named Postcard Audio. The band's line-up then included vocalist, guitarist, keyboardist and principal songwriter Jeremy Griffith, guitarist Justin Etheridge, bass guitarist Jake Brown and drummer Brandon Cook. Cook was replaced by Timothy Kirkpatrick in May 2003 and a month later the band was renamed Moments in Grace. The band recorded sixteen songs over the span of three months, split between June–August 2003 and November 2003, with producer Brian McTernan at Salad Days in Beltsville, Maryland; four of which appeared on These Days Will Fade (with the rest appearing on Moonlight Survived).

In promotion of the material released on These Days Will Fade and Moonlight Survived, Moments in Grace toured the United States and Canada several times between December 2003 and February 2005, accompanied by such bands My Chemical Romance, Avenged Sevenfold, Finger Eleven, Thrice, Silverstein, Funeral for a Friend, Alexisonfire, From First to Last, Smile Empty Soul, Bayside, Hot Water Music, Darkest Hour, Further Seems Forever, Poison the Well, A Thorn for Every Heart, Steriogram, Thornley, Strata, Brandtson, Planes Mistaken for Stars, The Jealous Sound, Beloved, Zolof The Rock & Roll Destroyer, Noise Ratchet, Rock 'n' Roll Soldiers, Vaux, Engine Down, Statistics, June, Madcap, The Kicks, Don't Look Down and Decahedron. The band also performed on Van's Warped Tour and at notable festivals like Skate and Surf Festival in Asbury Park, New Jersey, The Fest in Gainesville, Florida and the Millennium Music Conference in Harrisburg, Pennsylvania.

== Composition and recording ==
These Days Will Fade was written while the band was still named Postcard Audio, with vocalist, guitarist, keyboardist and principal songwriter Jeremy Griffith, guitarist Justin Etheridge, bass guitarist Jake Brown and drummer Brandon Cook. On July 2, 2002, shortly after releasing its eponymous debut extended play, Postcard Audio opened for The Liar's Academy and Brandtson at Barnstormer's in Montevallo, Alabama. A month later, in August 2002, The Liar's Academy spent a week recording its extended play, Trading My Life, with record producer Brian McTernan at his Salad Days recording studio in Beltsville, Maryland. While taking a break from tracking, The Liar's Academy guitarist Matt Smith was listening to Postcard Audio's extended play when the music caught McTernan's attention. Impressed by Griffith's voice, McTernan, who was then also an A&R representative and artist developer for major record label Atlantic Records, flew down to St. Augustine, Florida to meet with the band and attend one of its shows.

In early November 2002, Postcard Audio began working with McTernan and announced that it would take a hiatus from playing shows to focus on the extended writing of a full-length album, hoping to enter Salad Days recording studio in March 2003 (though this was ultimately delayed by several months). By April 2003, the band was nearly done writing its full-length album, having written over thirty songs in the process, and citing influences like Jeff Buckley, U2, Ours, Sunny Day Real Estate, Foo Fighters and Hum. The band had recorded demo material at Griffith's home studio, The Factory, in Fort Walton Beach, Florida during most of 2002 and the first half of 2003.

In May 2003, Cook was replaced by former As Friends Rust and Culture drummer Timothy Kirkpatrick. Kirkpatrick was recommended by McTernan, who had heard of the drummer through members of The Liar's Academy's other band, Strike Anywhere; Strike Anywhere had toured twice with As Friends Rust in 2000 and 2001. In late June 2003, Postcard Audio was renamed Moments in Grace; the new name was inspired by lyrics from the song "Drink Deep" by Rites of Spring. The band immediately began tracking thirteen songs for its full-length album, Moonlight Survived, over the span of two months at Salad Days with producer McTernan (though the total number of tracks recorded eventually increased to sixteen during production).

Unhappy with the way the full-length sounded, the band returned to Salad Days in November 2003 to re-record some of the material, record a couple of extra songs, and fully re-mix the release. Moonlight Survived was completed by the end of November 2003, and the band quickly signed with Atlantic Records and McTernan's new Atlantic Records imprint, Salad Days Records, created specifically to release the band's music. The album was originally scheduled for release in May 2004, but it would ultimately be delayed by three months.

== Release, packaging and promotion ==
On December 12, 2003, the band released These Days Will Fade through Salad Days Records. The release included the songs "Stratus" and "Broken Promises", which were also scheduled to appear on Moonlight Survived; and "Curtain Call" and "The Silencing Truth", which were b-sides from the recording session and exclusive to this release. The extended play was offered as a free download (an idea suggested by McTernan), exclusively through the band's website and through webzine AbsolutePunk. It also included an extensive digital booklet designed by Shelby Cinca and Gabriel Baldessin at Passkontrol. The band later stated in interviews that These Days Will Fade was intended as both an introduction to the band and a teaser of the forthcoming full-length album.

On March 23, 2004, Atlantic Records re-issued These Days Will Fade through all major digital retailers and also pressed a limited amount of promotional compact discs.

On June 15, 2004, Atlantic Records and Salad Days Records released "Stratus" as the extended play's first single, digitally and on compact disc; the release included an exclusive radio edit version of the song. On the same day, the two record labels also released a compact disc sampler, which included all three previously released songs from the band's forthcoming album: "Stratus", "Broken Promises" and "My Dying Day". The sampler managed to reach No. 2 on CMJ New Music Report's Loud College Rock Adds, No. 3 on Loud Rock Crucial Spins Add, and No. 14 on CMJ Top 200 Adds, on June 21, 2004.

On July 17, 2004, Moments in Grace filmed a music video for the lead single "Stratus", with director Laurent Briet in Los Angeles, California. The video premiered on August 12, 2004, five days before Moonlight Survived was released, and later aired on MTV and Fuse. On July 19, 2004, Moments in Grace was invited to MTV's Paramount Plaza studio for a photo shoot and video interview promoting These Days Will Fade and the forthcoming Moonlight Survived.

Moonlight Survived was released on August 17, 2004, through Atlantic Records and Salad Days Records. The double vinyl edition included the two songs from These Days Will Fade as bonus songs; "Curtain Call" and "The Silencing Truth". The song "Broken Promises" was also included in the Criterion Games / Electronic Arts racing video game, Burnout 3: Takedown, released on September 4, 2004.

== Touring ==
In promotion of These Days Will Fade, Moments in Grace began touring full-time, ultimately spending over a year on the road, starting right after the album's recording was completed (nine months before it was released), and lasting six months after its release. The band first toured across the Southern United States, from Florida to California, spanning December 10–17, 2003. The trip culminated with a benefit show at the House of Blues in West Hollywood, California in direct support of Thrice. Moments in Grace next played three shows as part of a Californian mini-tour, from January 2–4, 2004, accompanied by Avenged Sevenfold and Saosin.

A tour with Engine Down, Statistics and Decahedron, spanning from January 31 to February 19, 2004, took the bands through the East Coast, South and Midwest of the United States. This was immediately followed by a Southern and Midwest United States tour with Smile Empty Soul, from February 20 to March 1, 2004. From there, Moments in Grace met back up with Engine Down and The Jealous Sound for four dates in the Midwest and Northeast United States between March 2–7, 2004. The band next met up with Bayside and Madcap for a week's worth of shows on the East Coast of the United States from March 11–15, 2004.

Moments in Grace met up with Thrice and Poison the Well for a three-week tour of the East Coast, South and West Coast of the United States, spanning from March 17 to April 8, 2004. The first week of shows also included My Chemical Romance and Vaux, while the last two weeks included Darkest Hour. From there, the band met up with From First to Last and A Thorn for Every Heart for West Coast and Midwest United States dates spanning April 9–15, 2004, followed by a stop to play Asbury Park, New Jersey's Skate and Surf Festival on April 17, 2004.

The band rejoined Avenged Sevenfold for a lengthy six-week tour of the East Coast, South and West Coast of the United States and crossing into Western Canada, from April 16 to May 24, 2004. The tour also included My Chemical Romance from April 16 to May 14; Funeral for a Friend from April 17–23; Beloved from April 24 to May 4; and Noise Ratchet from May 5–24. Moments in Grace reunited with Smile Empty Soul for a three-week tour of the Midwest and Northeast United States, from June 2–20, 2004, accompanied by Steriogram. The tour included a cross-over show with Shinedown on June 13, 2004 at the Starland Ballroom in Sayreville, New Jersey.

The band was then invited to perform at the music showcase Millennium Music Conference, which took place at the Crowne Plaza hotel in Harrisburg, Pennsylvania on June 24, 2004. Moments in Grace next joined Van's Warped Tour for a series of performances across the Southern and West Coast United States, from June 25 to July 11, 2004. The band played on the Punkrocks.net stage and held a giveaway contest in cooperation with Alternative Press, of prizes including iTunes gift certificates, iPods, and an Apple 14-inch iBook G4 to fans who signed up to its mailing list. On July 18, 2004, the band flew to Washington D.C. for a one-off show with The Honorary Title at Black Cat, and from July 20 to August 12, 2004, toured the East Coast and Midwest United States with Finger Eleven, Thornley and Strata.

In celebration of Moonlight Survived's release, Moments in Grace played three album-release shows accompanied by Taken From You. The first was held at The Handlebar in Pensacola, Florida on August 15, 2004; the second at Common Grounds Coffee House in Gainesville, Florida on August 17, 2004; and the third at Cafe Eleven in St. Augustine, Florida on August 18, 2004.

Moments in Grace supported Seether for a one-off show at the UFC Arena in Orlando, Florida on August 28, 2004. A week later, the band was back on the road for two months-worth of shows. From September 3–13, 2004, the band played a mix of headlining and co-headlining dates in the South and West Coast of the United States. The co-headlining dates included shows with The Working Title and Mae in Charleston, South Carolina on September 3, 2004; Fear Before the March of Flames and A Thorn for Every Heart in Dallas, Texas on September 7, 2004; Colossal in Bakersfield, California on September 12, 2004; and The Kinison, Killradio and A Wilhelm Scream in Pomona, California on September 13, 2004.

The band next teamed up with Further Seems Forever, Brandtson and The Kicks for the "Hide Nothing Tour", which Moments in Grace joined from September 15 to October 4, 2004. The tour took the bands through the United States' West Coast (including a date in Western Canada), the Midwest and the East Coast. Another one-off show paired Moments in Grace with The Starting Line and Park in Tucson, Arizona on October 11, 2004, while the band travelled to meet up its next tour package.

For its final tour of the year, Moments in Grace teamed up with Hot Water Music for "The New What Next Tour", spanning six weeks from October 13 to November 21, 2004. The package tour also included Alexisonfire from October 13 to November 13; Don't Look Down from October 13–23; Planes Mistaken for Stars from October 23 to November 21; and Silverstein from November 15–21. Engine Down was initially to be on the tour but was replaced by Silverstein. The trip took the bands through the United States' West Coast, South and East Coast, followed by two dates in Canada, and finished in the American Midwest. It also included a stop to play The Fest 3 festival in Gainesville, Florida on October 31, 2004. A Various Artists sampler, including Moments in Grace's songs "Stratus" and "Broken Promises", as well as the music video for "Stratus" in an enhanced portion of the disc, was released simultaneously. The compact disc sampler also included songs and videos by Hot Water Music, Alexisonfire and Planes Mistaken for Stars.

On its way back home to Florida from the tour with Hot Water Music, Moments in Grace played two shows as part of clothing store Hollister Co.'s promotional event, "Club Cali Presents: The 12 Days of Rock". The clothing company held in-store concerts by thirteen bands over twelve days at various malls across the United States. Moments in Grace was the only band to perform two shows: the first at North Point Mall in Alpharetta, Georgia on November 29, 2004; and the second at The Mall at Millenia in Orlando, Florida on December 3, 2004.

Moments in Grace next embarked on an American West Coast tour with Rock 'n' Roll Soldiers, spanning from January 15–25, 2005. The trip included dates in California, Arizona and Nevada, at such venues as Soma in San Diego, Troubadour in West Hollywood, GameWorks in Las Vegas and Cafe Du Nord in San Francisco. A week-and-a-half later, Moments in Grace was back on the road for another American West Coast tour, this time with June and Zolof The Rock & Roll Destroyer, spanning from February 4–18, 2005. The tour was originally to include Halfwayhome, but due to changes in membership, the band had to pull out. Moments in Grace again played in California and Arizona on this tour, at such venues as GameWorks in Tucson, Knitting Factory in Hollywood, and Chain Reaction in Anaheim. The trip also included a one-off show with National Product and Take the Crown at Troubadour in West Hollywood on February 8, 2005.

Moments in Grace continued with several one-off headlining shows in late February and early March 2005, including the one-year anniversary party of webzine A Thousand Apologies in Tempe, Arizona on February 25, 2005. The band's next headlining show was on March 5, 2005 at Mr. Cue's Billiards in Lancaster, California with Saosin; it would be the band's final performance. At the time of Moments in Grace's break-up in early March 2005, the bands booking agency, Pinnacle Entertainment, was already in the midst of booking several more tours, including a headlining trek from March 25 to April 6, 2005, and dates on Van's Warped Tour in early August 2005.

== Track listing ==
All music written by Moments in Grace. Credits are adapted from the EP's liner notes.

No.	Title	Length
1.	"Stratus"	4:08
2.	"Broken Promises"	3:21
3.	"Curtain Call"	3:26
4.	"The Silencing Truth"	2:28
Total length:		14:23

== Personnel ==
Credits are adapted from the EP's liner notes.

Moments in Grace

- Jeremy Griffith – vocals, guitar, keyboards, organ, piano
- Justin Etheridge – guitar
- Jake Brown – bass guitar
- Timothy Kirkpatrick – drums

Guest musicians

- Teri Lazar – violin
- Kim Miller – violin
- Osman Kivrak – viola
- Lisa Ferebee – cello
- Greg Watkins – double bass

Production

- Brian McTernan – recording engineer, mixing engineer and producer at Salad Days
- Pedro Aida – assistant recording engineer at Salad Days
- Matt Squire – Pro Tools engineer at Salad Days
- Michael Barbiero – mixing engineer at Soundtracks
- George Marino – mastering engineer at Sterling Sound
- Charlie Barnett – string arranger
- Brian McTernan – A&R at Salad Days Records and Atlantic Records
- Larry Jacobson – management at Larry Jacobson Company
- Ryan Harlacher – booking at Pinnacle Entertainment
- David Conway – EP coordinator
- Shelby Cinca – artwork and art direction at Passkontrol
- Gabriel Baldessin – artwork and art direction at Passkontrol

== Release history ==
Release formats for These Days Will Fade
Region	Date	Label	Format	Catalog
United States	December 12, 2003	Salad Days Records	Digital	301443
United States	March 23, 2004	Atlantic Records	Digital	301443
United States	March 23, 2004	Atlantic Records / Salad Days Records	CD	PRCD 301443
