= Timothy Kirkpatrick =

American drummer

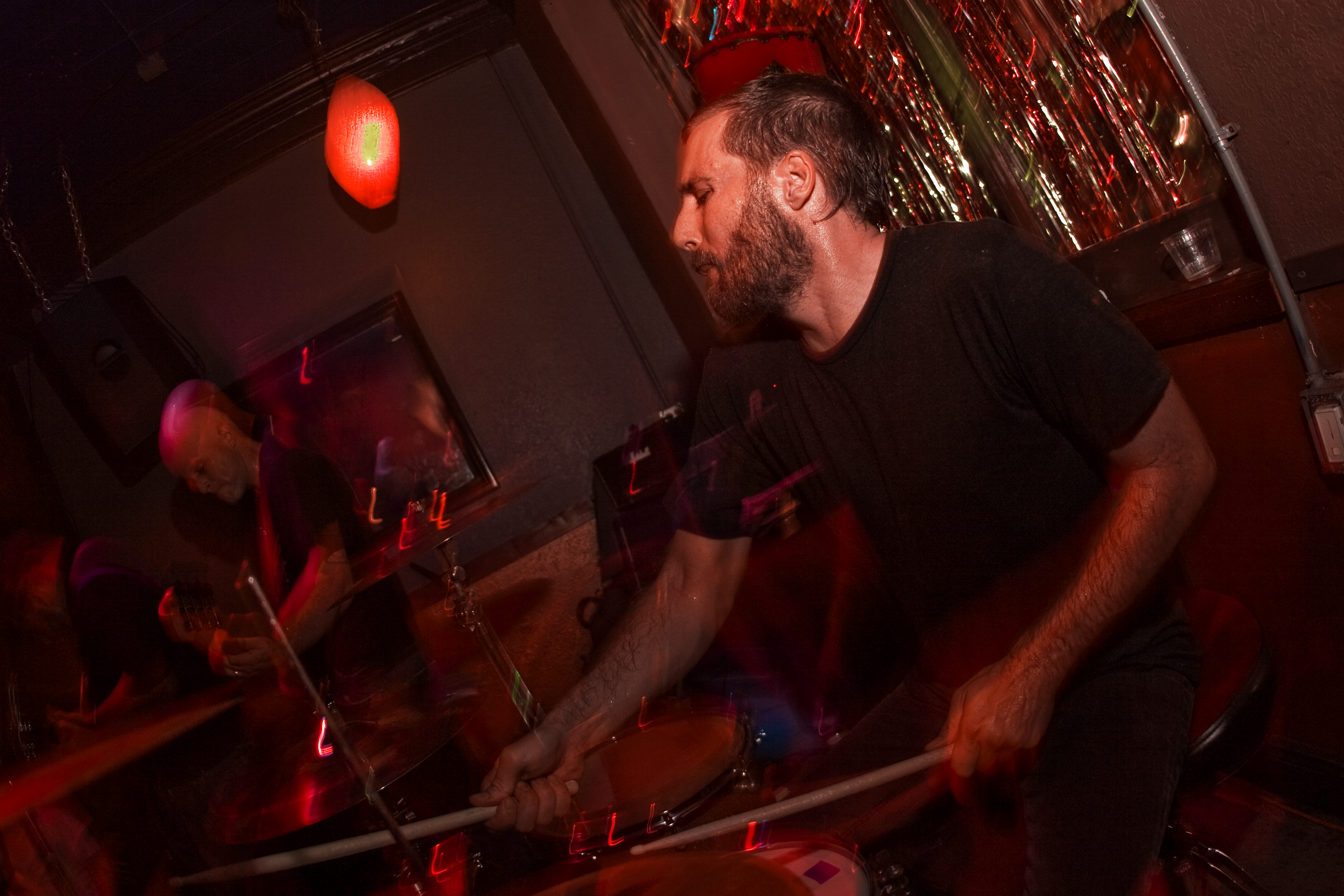
- Kirkpatrick performing with As Friends Rust at The Atlantic in Gainesville, Florida on August 15, 2008.

Background information
- Born: Timothy James Kirkpatrick; June 11, 1978 (age 48); Palm Beach Gardens, Florida
- Genres: Alternative rock; art rock; emotional hardcore; hardcore punk; indie rock; melodic hardcore; metallic hardcore; post-hardcore; post-rock
- Occupations: Drummer; musician; songwriter
- Instrument: Drums
- Years active: 1993–present
- Labels: Atlantic; Arkain; Boxcar; Cosmic Note; Demons Run Amok; Eulogy; Doghouse; Generic; Genet; Golf; Good Life; Howling Bull; Infectious; Initial; Intention; Mighty Atom; Salad Days; Shield; Toybox; Unity Worldwide; Uprising; Vagrant
- Member of: As Friends Rust
- Formerly of: Argentina; Bloodpact; Burgundy; Culture; Damien Done; Ithaca; Moments in Grace; Postcard Audio; Roosevelt; Shaft; Swayze; Tiger Mouth

Timothy James Kirkpatrick (born June 11, 1978) is an American drummer. Originally from Palm Beach Gardens, Florida, Kirkpatrick played in punk band Shaft and emotional hardcore bands Roosevelt and Burgundy in his teens. After a brief stay in Ann Arbor, Michigan, where he played in the hardcore band Bloodpact, Kirkpatrick moved to Gainesville, Florida in 1997, and joined metallic hardcore band Culture and melodic hardcore band As Friends Rust, both with vocalist Damien Moyal.

Kirkpatrick next played in acoustic/indie rock musician Keith Welsh's live backing band, Tiger Mouth, art rock band Argentina, post-rock band Ithaca, and indie/alt-country band Swayze, all also based in Gainesville. He moved to St. Augustine, Florida in 2003 to join alternative rock/post-hardcore band Postcard Audio, which quickly changed name to Moments in Grace a month after his arrival. Kirkpatrick rejoined As Friends Rust in 2008 when the band reformed, and collaborated with post-punk band Damien Done in 2016.

== Background ==
=== Shaft, Roosevelt, Burgundy and Bloodpact (1993–1997) ===
Kirkpatrick's first musical project was a punk band named Shaft in Palm Beach Gardens, Florida, which also included guitarist James Glayat. Following Shaft's dissolution, Kirkpatrick and Glayat together joined emotional hardcore band Roosevelt in October 1994. Roosevelt also included vocalist Timothy Shaner, guitarist Justin Shaner, and bass guitarist Christopher Irving; all three had previously played in the hardcore band Platform together.

Roosevelt recorded a six-song demo tape using a four-track recorder in Irving's apartment in late 1994, and began playing shows around Florida. The band caught the attention of Vero Beach, Florida-based record label Intention Records, which offered the band a spot on an upcoming Various Artists compilation, scheduled to feature such bands as Culture, Tension and Afterall. In April 1995, Roosevelt recorded four songs with producer Jeremy Staska at Studio 13 in Deerfield Beach, Florida. After sending one of the songs to Intention Records, the band found out that Culture was the only other band to send in material, so the Various Artists compilation was transformed into a split 7-inch vinyl, released in May 1995.

After playing many more shows throughout Florida, Roosevelt was signed to Melbourne, Florida-based record label Boxcar Records, which quickly made plans to release the three remaining songs from the April 1995 recording session as the band's eponymous 7-inch vinyl extended play. The band, however, parted ways in October 1995, months before its second release would arrive from the pressing plant, in January 1996.

After Roosevelt's breakup, Kirkpatrick continued playing with Justin Shaner and Timothy Shaner, recruiting David LeBleu for a new indie/emo band named Burgundy. The band recorded a demo tape using a four-track recorder and played a handful of shows in Florida but parted ways before the end of 1996. Afterwards, Kirkpatrick briefly relocated to Ann Arbor, Michigan where he joined the startup metalcore band Bloodpact, with members of Earthmover.

=== Culture and As Friends Rust (1997–2000) ===
In September 1997, Kirkpatrick moved to Gainesville, Florida and simultaneously joined established metallic hardcore band Culture and semi-reformed melodic hardcore band As Friends Rust. The two bands then shared several members, including vocalist Damien Moyal and guitarists Gordon Tarpley and Stephen Looker; Culture additionally included new bass guitarist Christopher "Floyd" Beckham. With its new line-up, Culture entered Goldentone Studios in Gainesville, Florida to record seven songs with producer Rob McGregor, intended for a release titled Reborn of You, or Mike Warden Can Suck It (a pun on Judge's Chung King Can Suck It). The release was stuck in limbo at Toybox Records and was never properly released until years later. In September 2012, Eulogy Recordings, Ghetto Josh Records and New Ethic Record Co-Op co-released the compilation of previously unreleased material, From the Vaults: Demos and Outtakes 1993–1998, which included the songs from Reborn of You.

In November–December 1997, Culture was booked for a month-long tour of Europe with American punk rock band Gang Green, but was kicked off when the latter objected to playing shows with a straight-edge band. Culture instead performed at the Chicago Hardcore Festival in Chicago, Illinois and Gainesvillefest in Gainesville, Florida in December 1997, and did a series of mini-tours up the East Coast and Midwest of the United States during January–February 1998.

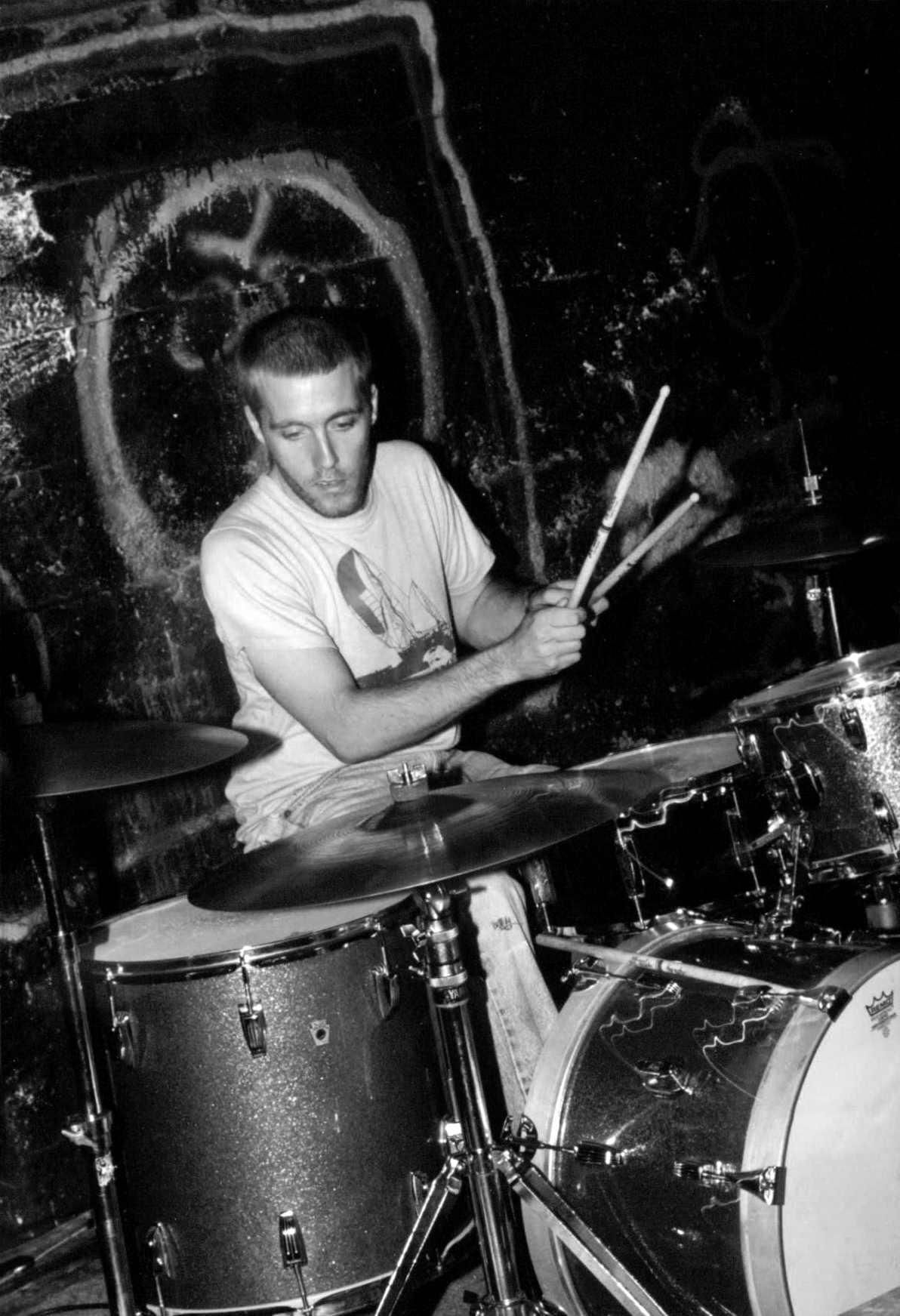
Kirkpatrick performing with As Friends Rust at 33 Tyler Street in Buffalo, New York on June 29, 2000.

In early 1998, Looker and Kirkpatrick wrote a handful of As Friends Rust songs together between Culture tours, but the band came to a halt when Looker quit both As Friends Rust and Culture to join Morning Again, moving to Coral Springs, Florida in March 1998. Moyal quickly asked ex-Morning Again and ex-Bird of Ill Omen guitarist Joseph Simmons to join both Culture and As Friends Rust, and recruited Hot Water Music's roadie Kaleb Stewart as bass guitarist and backing vocalist for As Friends Rust. With an intact line-up, As Friends Rust recorded the song "Home Is Where the Heart Aches" at Goldentone Studios in late March 1998 with McGregor. "Home Is Where the Heart Aches" was combined with four songs from the band's 1996 demo recording session to make up As Friends Rust's debut extended play, The Fists of Time, released by Good Life Recordings in July 1998.

From April–May 1998, Culture was booked for a two-month North American tour with Shutdown, but the band's van broke down on the way to the first show and Culture was unable to continue the tour. Frustrated by the event, Tarpley quit both As Friends Rust and Culture simultaneously in April 1998, leading Moyal to recruit ex-Morning Again bass guitarist and then-guitarist of Bird of Ill Omen (though the band was on hiatus) Peter Bartsocas as As Friends Rust's new guitarist and co-backing vocalist, and ex-Wounded Knee guitarist Kenneth Brian Sulak for Culture. As Friends Rust embarked on a five-week tour of the United States accompanied by Discount and Dillinger Four in June–July 1998. The tour included stops to play at such festivals as More Than Music in Columbus, Ohio, Tin Can Full of Dreams in Lawrence, Massachusetts and Wilkes-Barre Festival in Wilkes-Barre, Pennsylvania.

Culture then toured Europe in August–September 1998, which included a stop to play the Ieper Hardcore Festival in Ypres, Belgium. Upon returning home, Kirkpatrick quit Culture, but remained with As Friends Rust. Kirkpatrick recruited ex-Shaft and Roosevelt bandmate, guitarist James Glayat, to replace Bartsocas in As Friends Rust in October 1998, and the band returned to Goldentone Studios to record "The First Song on the Tape You Make Her" with McGregor. The song, which had been partly written with Bartsocas, would appear on a split CD and 7-inch vinyl with Discount, released by Good Life Recordings in December 1998. As Friends Rust returned to tour Europe and the United Kingdom from December 1998 to January 1999, accompanied by Discount and Purusam.

In late 1998, As Friends Rust signed a three-record deal with record label Doghouse Records, and in May 1999 returned to Goldentone Studios to record six songs with McGregor. As Friends Rust was released by Doghouse Records on September 17, 1999; the European version, released earlier in July 1999, was erroneously promoted under the titles God Hour and 6-Song CD by Good Life Recordings. As Friends Rust toured the United States in June–July 1999, accompanied by Keith Welsh. The tour included stops to play the Wilkes-Barre Summer Music Festival in Kingston, Pennsylvania and Syracuse Hell Fest in Syracuse, New York. The band quickly followed up with a five-week European and British tour in July–August 1999, playing at such festivals as Good Life Midsummer Hardcore Festival in Kuurne, Belgium, Festival Hardcore in Sant Feliu De Guíxols, Spain and Ieper Hardcore Festival in Ypres, Belgium.

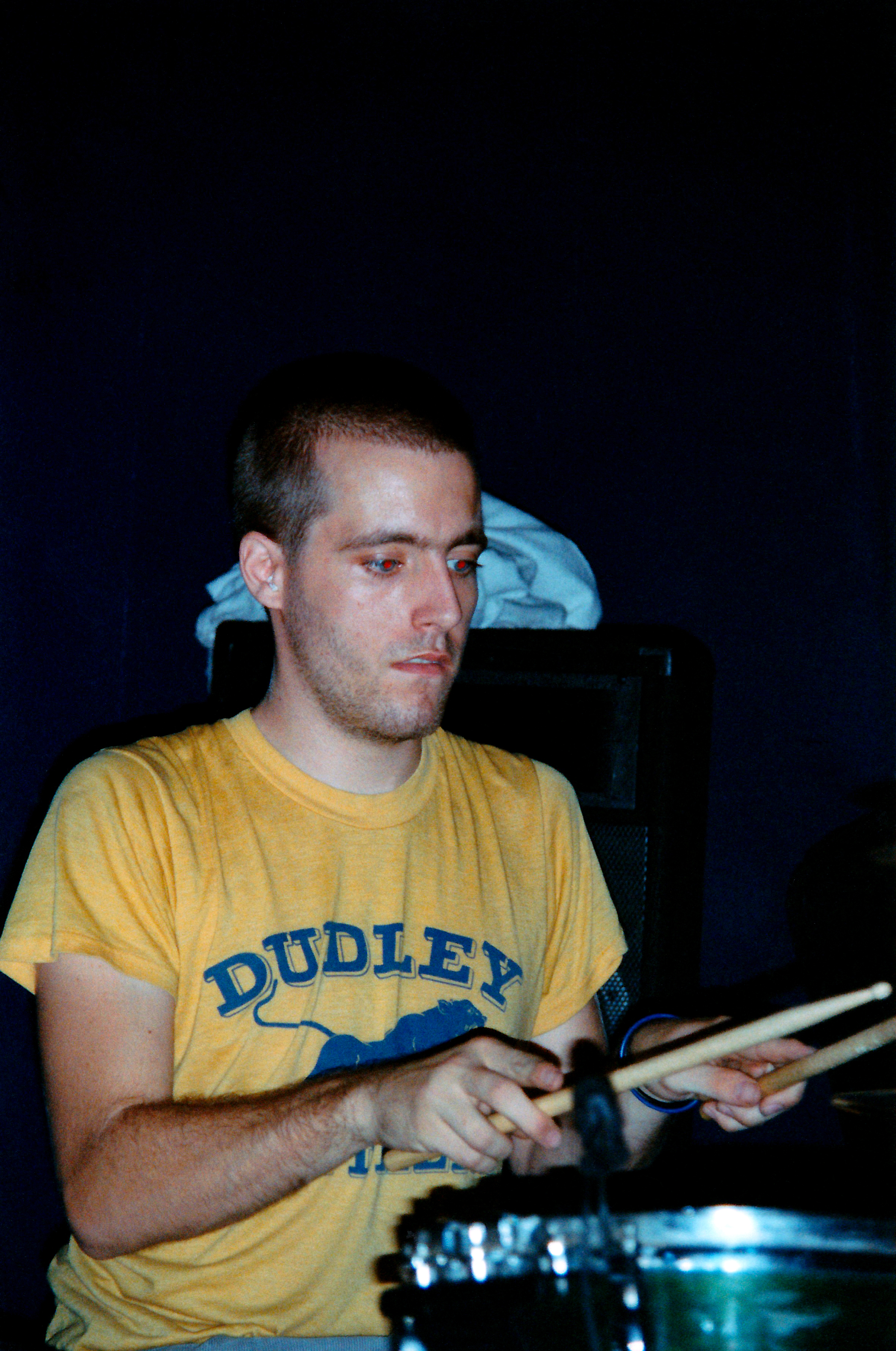
Kirkpatrick performing with As Friends Rust at The Star and Garter in Manchester, England on August 24, 2000.

On October 5, 1999, Japanese record label Howling Bull Entertainment released the compilation Eleven Songs, which included a selection of As Friends Rust material from 1996–1999. In December 1999, the band played Gainesvillefest in Gainesville, Florida. During the first half of 2000, As Friends Rust went on mini-tours with Fast Times and Good Clean Fun, and also played The Copper Sun Indie Records Winter Festival in Wilkes-Barre, Pennsylvania, Detroit Festival in Detroit, Michigan and Krazy Fest 3 in Louisville, Kentucky.

On June 22, 2000, Doghouse Records re-issued The Fists of Time. As Friends Rust immediately embarked on a tour with Strike Anywhere to promote the release, playing shows across the entire United States in June 2000. The tour included several cross-over shows with Glasseater, Mid Carson July and The Agency (the three of which were on a separate tour together), as well as stops to play such festivals as Mixed Messages in Minneapolis, Minnesota, Pheer Festival in College Park, Maryland and Hellfest 2K in Auburn, New York (the last of which As Friends Rust did not play due to a last-minute change in venue).

In July 2000, Good Life Recordings invited As Friends Rust back to Europe for a week's worth of shows in Belgium and the Netherlands, including a performance at Dour Festival in Dour, Belgium and another at Metropolis Festival in Rotterdam, Netherlands. A month later, the band returned to Europe and the United Kingdom for a full five-week tour, from August–September 2000, which included a handful of cross-over shows with Grade, Ensign and Garrison. This European and British tour also included stops at Ieper Hardcore Festival in Ypres, Belgium, TurboPunk Festival, in Poznań, Poland, Transmitter Festival in Hohenems, Austria and Complete MADness Festival in Potsdam, Germany.

Prior to leaving for Europe and the United Kingdom in August 2000, Kirkpatrick and Glayat had announced their desire to leave the band upon returning home. However, tensions during the tour ultimately caused a much bigger change in membership. On the way to Ieper Hardcore Festival, less than a week into the tour, the band was involved in a motor vehicle accident in Belgium, which badly damaged the touring van and resulted with Glayat suffering from torn ligaments in his leg. With Glayat wearing a splint, the band continued on to half a week's worth of shows in the United Kingdom, following which the injured guitarist opted to fly back home instead of crossing back into Europe. Ex-guitarist Bartsocas, who was visiting Europe at the same time and had been travelling with the band, filled the vacant guitarist position for the next four weeks of shows. Three weeks later, Moyal suffered from laryngitis and lost his voice, leading Stewart to switch from bass guitar to lead vocals, and Bartsocas temporarily filling in as bass guitarist. Moyal and Simmons called ex-Culture, ex-Morning Again and ex-Crucible bass guitarist Beckham (Glayat's at-the-time roommate) from Europe, asking him to join As Friends Rust as its new guitarist upon returning home, much to Stewart's dismay, leading the latter to quit the band.

=== Tiger Mouth, Argentina, Ithaca and Swayze (1998–2006) ===
In 1998, Kirkpatrick joined acoustic musician Keith Welsh's live backing band, which eventually took on the name Tiger Mouth. As Tiger Mouth, the band recorded the full-length album We Are All Surviving, released on February 16, 2006, by Tavernier, Florida-based record label Goodbye Blue Skies.

Kirkpatrick next joined established Gainesville, Florida-based art rock band Argentina in June 2001. The band also included vocalist and guitarist Alex Lopez, vocalist and bass guitarist Drew DeMaio, and keyboardist (and former drummer) Mario Lopez. The band had just released its second extended play, Diving Board, and recruited Kirkpatrick a couple of weeks before leaving on a tour in June 2001. In October–November 2001, Argentina toured the United States again, and released a split 7-inch vinyl with Ithaca through record label Generic Productions. Kirkpatrick later filled in as drummer for a single Ithaca show on February 28, 2002. Argentina played its last show on May 24, 2002, at the first The Fest in Gainesville, Florida.

Kirkpatrick also played in Gainesville-based indie/alternative/country band Swayze, sporadically from 2003 to 2004. The band also included vocalist and guitarist Jesse Zeigler, guitarist Andrew Kulick, guitarist and keyboardist Michael Maines, bass guitarist Wade McMullen. With Swayze, Kirkpatrick contributed to the band's sophomore album A Shame Play, released by Arkain Records on March 4, 2004.

=== Postcard Audio and Moments in Grace (2003–2005) ===
In May 2003, Kirkpatrick moved from Gainesville to St. Augustine to join alternative rock/post-hardcore band Postcard Audio, replacing the band's second drummer, Brandon Cook. Kirkpatrick had been recommended by record producer and Atlantic Records A&R representative and artist developer Brian McTernan, who was about to record with the band at his Salad Days recording studio in Beltsville, Maryland. Shortly after changing drummers, Postcard Audio announced that the band would be officially changing its name to Moments in Grace by the end of June 2003.

The band immediately began tracking thirteen songs for its full-length album, Moonlight Survived, over the span of two months at Salad Days with McTernan (though the total number of tracks recorded eventually increased to sixteen during production). The band then embarked on its second tour (the first with Kirkpatrick), accompanied by The Last Great Liar in August and September 2003. Unhappy with the way Moonlight Survived sounded, the band returned to Salad Days in November 2003 to re-record some of the material, track a couple of extra songs, and fully re-mix the release. Moonlight Survived was completed by the end of November 2003, and the band quickly signed with Atlantic Records and McTernan's new Atlantic Records imprint, Salad Days Records, created specifically to release the band's music. The album was originally scheduled for release in May 2004, but it would ultimately be delayed by three months.

On December 12, 2003, Moments in Grace released the extended play These Days Will Fade, through Salad Days Records. The extended play was later re-issued by Atlantic Records on March 23, 2004. In promotion of the release, the band hit the road in December 2003; the trip culminating with a show at the House of Blues in West Hollywood, California in direct support of Thrice. The band next played a Californian mini-tour in January 2004 accompanied by Avenged Sevenfold and Saosin.

Moments in Grace began touring full-time in support of its forthcoming Atlantic Records album, Moonlight Survived, remaining on the road for the next ten months. This included a tours with Engine Down, Statistics and Decahedron in January–February 2004, Smile Empty Soul in February–March 2004, Engine Down and The Jealous Sound in March 2004, Bayside and Madcap in March 2004, Thrice, Poison the Well, My Chemical Romance, Vaux and Darkest Hour in March–April 2004, From First to Last and A Thorn for Every Heart for in April 2004, Avenged Sevenfold, My Chemical Romance, Funeral for a Friend, Beloved and Noise Ratchet in April–May 2004, and Smile Empty Soul and Steriogram in June 2004.

Coinciding with their shows together, Moments in Grace and Funeral for a Friend teamed up for a split 7-inch vinyl, co-released through Atlantic Records, Salad Days Records, Mighty Atom Records and Infectious Records, on April 20, 2004. On June 15, 2004, Atlantic Records and Salad Days Records released "Stratus" as a single. The band was then invited to perform at the music showcase Millennium Music Conference in Harrisburg, Pennsylvania on June 24, 2004. Moments in Grace next joined Van's Warped Tour for a series of performances from June–July 2004.

Following Van's Warped Tour, Moments in Grace filmed a music video for "Stratus" with director Laurent Briet in Los Angeles, California. The video premiered on August 12, 2004, five days before Moonlight Survived was released. In July–August 2004, the band toured with Finger Eleven, Thornley and Strata. Moonlight Survived was finally released on August 17, 2004, through Atlantic Records and Salad Days Records. In celebration, the band played three album-release shows in Florida, accompanied by Taken From You.

A week later, the band was back on the road for two months-worth of shows. In September 2004, the band played a mix of headlining and co-headlining dates with The Working Title, Mae, Fear Before the March of Flames, A Thorn for Every Heart, The Kinison, Killradio and A Wilhelm Scream. In September–October 2004, the band toured with Further Seems Forever, Brandtson and The Kicks. In October–November 2004, the band was on the road with Hot Water Music, Alexisonfire, Planes Mistaken for Stars, Silverstein and Don't Look Down, including a stop to play The Fest 3 festival in Gainesville, Florida.

In late 2004, Kirkpatrick invited his former Shaft, Roosevelt and As Friends Rust bandmate James Glayat to replace Moments in Grace's guitarist Justin Etheridge. The band then relocated to Burbank, California and embarked on tours with Rock 'n' Roll Soldiers in January 2005, and with June and Zolof The Rock & Roll Destroyer in February 2005. The band's next headlining show would be Moments in Grace's final performance, on March 5, 2005, with Saosin. Following the band's split, Kirkpatrick remained in California for the next thirteen years, before moving back to Florida in 2018.

=== Argentina reunion, As Friends Rust reunion and Damien Done (2007–present) ===
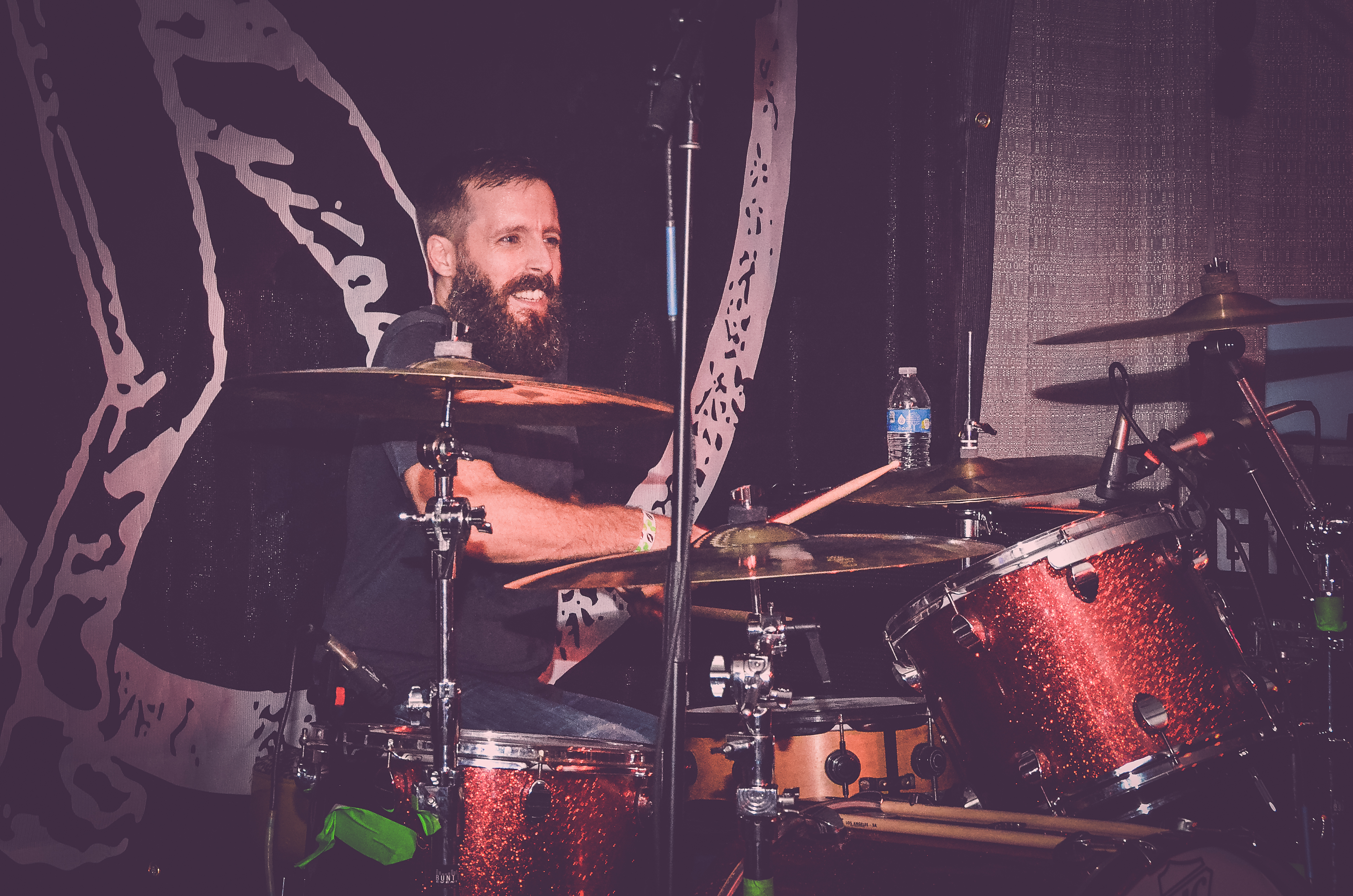
Kirkpatrick performing with As Friends Rust at The Fest 14 in Gainesville, Florida on October 31, 2015.

On October 27, 2007, Kirkpatrick rejoined Argentina for a one-off reunion show at The Atlantic for The Fest 6 festival in Gainesville, Florida. Kirkpatrick then rejoined As Friends Rust in March 2008, when vocalist Damien Moyal announced that the band would reunite for a series of European and British shows scheduled for August 2008. It was further revealed that the band would be performing with its 1998–2000 line-up (referred to as "The Porch Days" line-up), also including Joseph Simmons, Kaleb Stewart and James Glayat. The Back in Coffee Black Tour '08 kicked off with a single American show at The Atlantic in Gainesville, Florida, followed by six shows in Europe and Britain. As Friends Rust recorded demos of new songs in June 2011, but the band was not satisfied with the result and shelved the material.

In June 2014, As Friends Rust traveled to Asia for the Japan Tour 2014, supported by Japanese hardcore bands Endzweck, Noy and Nervous Light of Sunday, though Kirkpatrick was unable to attend and was temporarily replaced by former Culture drummer Joshua Williams. In promotion of the tour, Japanese record label Cosmic Note released the best-of compilation album Greatest Hits? on June 4, 2014, which included a selection of the band's recordings from 1996 to 2002. The compilation was re-issued by Indonesian record label D'Kolektif on December 27, 2014, and Dutch record label Shield Recordings on April 29, 2015.

On May 22, 2015, German record label Demons Run Amok Entertainment released The Porch Days: 1998 to 2000 on 12-inch vinyl. The release compiled all of the band's studio recordings from 1998 to 2000, as well as previously unreleased live recordings of two of the three songs composed-but-never-properly-recorded by the band with that line-up. To support the release, As Friends Rust played three shows in 2015: one at Saint Vitus in Brooklyn, New York, a second at Groezrock festival in Meerhout, Belgium, and a third The Wooly as part of The Fest 14 in Gainesville, Florida.

In 2016, Kirkpatrick joined As Friends Rust vocalist Damien Moyal's post-punk band Damien Done, contributing drums to the EP He Really Tried / And Now the Rain, released by Demons Run Amok Entertainment on July 8, 2016. The songs also featured bass guitarist Mike Hasty (formerly of Walls of Jericho), electric guitarist Juan Montoya (formerly of Floor, Cavity and Torche), in addition to Moyal on vocals and guitar. Hasty also engineered and produced the session.

Following Kirkpatrick's return to Florida in 2018, As Friends Rust announced that it was actively writing and demoing new songs for a planned second full-length album. The band revealed that it would be recording and releasing a two-song extended play in mid-2019 (though this was ultimately delayed by a year), as a precursor to the band's sophomore album. The band played three shows in 2019: one at The Kingsland in Brooklyn, New York, and two on the same day at Molotow in Hamburg, Germany as part of the Booze Cruise Festival. Upon returning from Booze Cruise, As Friends Rust parted ways with bass guitarist Stewart, though the band did not immediately look for a replacement bass guitarist.

As Friends Rust recorded two songs for its comeback extended play, Up from the Muck, in early March 2020. The recording sessions were tracked individually at various studios in Florida and New York, then mixed by James Paul Wisner at Wisner Productions in St. Cloud, Florida. Up from the Muck was released by Unity Worldwide Records on July 3, 2020. The band still working on its planned second full-length album.
