= Moments in Grace =

American alternative rock band

- Also known as: Postcard Audio
- Origin: St. Augustine, Florida
- Genres: Alternative rock; post-hardcore
- Works: Moments in Grace discography
- Years active: 2001-2005, 2025-present
- Labels: Atlantic; Computer Club; Infectious; Mighty Atom; Salad Days; Vagrant
- Past members: Jeremy Griffith; Jake Brown; Timothy Kirkpatrick; James Glayat; (see Members section for others)

Moments in Grace (formerly known as Postcard Audio) was an alternative rock/post-hardcore band from St. Augustine, Florida, active from December 2001 to March 2005. In its final days, the band relocated to Burbank, California and its line-up included principal songwriter, lead vocalist, guitarist and keyboardist Jeremy Griffith; bass guitarist, keyboardist and backing vocalist Jake Brown; drummer Timothy Kirkpatrick; and guitarist James Glayat. Earlier in its span, the band also included drummers Jason Frazier and Brandon Cook, guitarists Shane Gibson and TJ Stein, and guitarist, keyboardist and backing vocalist Justin Etheridge.

As Postcard Audio, the band released an eponymous EP in July 2002 through Brown's own record label, Computer Club Records. The band spent the next year writing its full-length album, Moonlight Survived, but changed name to Moments in Grace in June 2003, shortly before it was recorded. While still named Postcard Audio, the band attracted the attention of record producer and Atlantic Records A&R representative Brian McTernan, who formed his own Atlantic Records imprint, Salad Days Records, specifically to release the band's music. Moments in Grace was properly introduced with These Days Will Fade, a free digital EP released by Salad Days Records in December 2003, and followed up with a split vinyl single with Funeral for a Friend, co-released by Atlantic Records, Salad Days Records, Mighty Atom Records and Infectious Records in April 2004. The band's only full-length album, Moonlight Survived, which includes the single "Stratus" (issued earlier in June 2004), was released after considerable delay in August 2004 through Atlantic Records and Salad Days Records.

Moments in Grace toured North America extensively in promotion of its releases, accompanied by such bands as My Chemical Romance, Avenged Sevenfold, Finger Eleven, Thrice, Silverstein, Funeral for a Friend, Alexisonfire, From First to Last, Smile Empty Soul, Bayside, Hot Water Music, Darkest Hour, Further Seems Forever, Poison the Well, A Thorn for Every Heart, Steriogram, Thornley, Strata, Brandtson, Planes Mistaken for Stars, The Jealous Sound, Beloved, Zolof The Rock & Roll Destroyer, Noise Ratchet, Rock 'n' Roll Soldiers, Vaux, Engine Down, Statistics, June, Madcap, The Kicks, Don't Look Down, Decahedron and The Last Great Liar.

== History ==
=== Postcard Audio (December 2001 – June 2003) ===
Postcard Audio was formed in December 2001 by vocalist, guitarist, keyboardist and principal songwriter Jeremy Griffith. Griffith was already signed to St. Augustine, Florida-based record label Computer Club Records as a solo artist, and formed Postcard Audio after moving back to Florida (after living in Boston), in order to perform shows with a full band. The name "Postcard Audio" was originally to be used as the title of Griffith's then-new fourteen-song album, which had been scheduled for release through Computer Club Records in the fall of 2001. The album was shelved but the label instead released a compilation of older Griffith recordings titled The Purple Magnolia, in September 2001.

The new band was immediately signed to Computer Club Records and its founder, Jake Brown (formerly of Twothirtyeight), joined as its bass guitarist, keyboardist and backing vocalist. The band was completed by drummer Jason Frazier and guitarist Shane Gibson, who joined right before the first show in January 2002.

By February 2002, the band had relocated to Fort Walton Beach/Niceville, Florida, and Frazier had been replaced by Brandon Cook, while Gibson was replaced by Brown's high school friend, Justin Etheridge. The first song played by the new line-up was "No Angel", which would be recorded a number of times over the years. Postcard Audio began recording material at Griffith's home studio, The Factory, in Fort Walton Beach, Florida in the spring of 2002. Five songs, "No Angels", "Don't Be", "Eddie", "Clouds at Jestu" and "Steps", were released on the band's eponymous debut extended play in July 2002 through Computer Club Records. The band cited Jeff Buckley, U2, Ours and Sunny Day Real Estate as influential to its early material. Postcard Audio continued writing and recording new music, announcing that its first full-length album was planned for release in August 2002.

On July 2, 2002, Postcard Audio opened for The Liar's Academy and Brandtson at Barnstormer's in Montevallo, Alabama. A month later, in August 2002, The Liar's Academy spent a week recording its extended play, Trading My Life, with record producer Brian McTernan at his Salad Days recording studio in Beltsville, Maryland. While taking a break from tracking, The Liar's Academy guitarist Matt Smith was listening to Postcard Audio's extended play when the music caught McTernan's attention. Impressed by Griffith's voice, McTernan, who was then also an A&R representative and artist developer for major record label Atlantic Records, flew down to St. Augustine, Florida to meet with the band and attend one of its shows.

Postcard Audio planned to tour in promotion of its debut extended play in August 2002 but the road trip fell through. The band finally embarked on its first tour, spanning five days throughout Florida from October 26–30, 2002, with The Last Great Liar. In early November 2002, Postcard Audio began working with McTernan and announced that it would take a hiatus from playing shows to focus on the extended writing of its full-length album, hoping to enter Salad Days recording studio in March 2003 (though this was ultimately delayed by several months). As early as December 2002, Postcard Audio considered changing its name.

By April 2003, the band was nearly done writing its full-length album, having written over thirty songs in the process, and hoped that the release would be out in January 2004. Postcard Audio then moved back St. Augustine, Florida. In May 2003, Cook was replaced by former As Friends Rust and Culture drummer Timothy Kirkpatrick, who moved from Gainesville, Florida to St. Augustine to join the band. Kirkpatrick was recommended by McTernan, who had heard of the drummer through members of The Liar's Academy's other band, Strike Anywhere; Strike Anywhere had toured twice with As Friends Rust in 2000 and 2001. Postcard Audio then announced that the band would be officially changing name by the end of June 2003.

=== Moments in Grace (June 2003 – January 2004) ===
In late June 2003, Postcard Audio was renamed Moments in Grace; the new name was inspired by lyrics from the song "Drink Deep" by Rites of Spring. The band immediately began tracking thirteen songs for its full-length album, Moonlight Survived, over the span of two months at Salad Days with producer McTernan (though the total number of tracks recorded eventually increased to sixteen during production). By this time, the band's influences had grown to include Foo Fighters and Hum. A second tour paired with The Last Great Liar took the two bands up the East Coast of the United States, from Florida to New York and back, spanning August 26 to September 9, 2003.

In October 2003, Moments in Grace was signed by Santa Monica, California-based music manager Larry Jacobson Company. Jacobson, formerly Senior Vice-president of Capitol Records, was then managing metalcore band Avenged Sevenfold; he would soon add post-hardcore band Hot Water Music and music producer Andrew Murdock to his exclusive clients. The Larry Jacobson Company was eventually renamed World Audience in 2004.

Unhappy with the way the full-length sounded, the band returned to Salad Days in November 2003 to re-record some of the material, record a couple of extra songs, and fully re-mix the release. Moonlight Survived was completed by the end of November 2003, and the band quickly signed with Atlantic Records and McTernan's new Atlantic Records imprint, Salad Days Records, created specifically to release the band's music. The album was originally scheduled for release in May 2004, but it would ultimately be delayed by three months. In November 2003, Moments in Grace became clients of public relations firm Earshot Media and signed for exclusive representation with Ryan Harlacher's booking agency Pinnacle Entertainment.

On December 12, 2003, the band released its second extended play, These Days Will Fade, through Salad Days Records. The release included the songs "Stratus" and "Broken Promises", which were also scheduled to appear on the forthcoming full-length; and "Curtain Call" and "The Silencing Truth", which were exclusive to the release. The extended play was offered as a free download (an idea suggested by McTernan), exclusively through the band's website and through webzine AbsolutePunk. It also included an extensive digital booklet designed by Shelby Cinca.

In promotion of These Days Will Fade, Moments in Grace hit the road across the Southern United States, from Florida to California, spanning December 10–17, 2003. The trip culminated with a benefit show at the House of Blues in West Hollywood, California in direct support of Thrice. Moments in Grace next played three shows as part of a Californian mini-tour, from January 2–4, 2004, accompanied by Avenged Sevenfold and Saosin.

=== Full-time touring and "Stratus" (January 2004 – August 2004) ===
Moments in Grace began touring full-time in support of its forthcoming Atlantic Records album, remaining on the road for the next ten months. A tour with Engine Down, Statistics and Decahedron, spanning from January 31 to February 19, 2004, took the bands through the East Coast, South and Midwest of the United States. This was immediately followed by a Southern and Midwest United States tour with Smile Empty Soul, from February 20 to March 1, 2004. From there, Moments in Grace met back up with Engine Down and The Jealous Sound for four dates in the Midwest and Northeast United States between March 2–7, 2004. The band next met up with Bayside and Madcap for a week's worth of shows on the East Coast of the United States from March 11–15, 2004.

Moments in Grace met up with Thrice and Poison the Well for a three-week tour of the East Coast, South and West Coast of the United States, spanning from March 17 to April 8, 2004. The first week of shows also included My Chemical Romance and Vaux, while the last two weeks included Darkest Hour. From there, the band met up with From First to Last and A Thorn for Every Heart for West Coast and Midwest United States dates spanning April 9–15, 2004, followed by a stop to play Asbury Park, New Jersey's Skate and Surf Festival on April 17, 2004. On March 23, 2004, Atlantic Records re-issued These Days Will Fade through all major digital retailers and also pressed a limited amount of promotional compact discs.

The band rejoined Avenged Sevenfold for a lengthy six-week tour of the East Coast, South and West Coast of the United States and crossing into Western Canada, from April 16 to May 24, 2004. The tour also included My Chemical Romance from April 16 to May 14; Funeral for a Friend from April 17–23; Beloved from April 24 to May 4; and Noise Ratchet from May 5–24. Coinciding with their shows together, Moments in Grace and Funeral for a Friend teamed up for a split 7-inch vinyl, co-released through Atlantic Records, Salad Days Records, Mighty Atom Records and Infectious Records, on April 20, 2004. Moments in Grace contributed the previously unreleased song "My Dying Day", which had been recorded at Salad Days in 2003, and was scheduled to appear on the forthcoming album Moonlight Survived. In promotion of the split 7-inch vinyl, which also featured a cover art designed by Shelby Cinca, webzine Ultimate Guitar held a giveaway contest for five winners to receive a record and a signed poster.

Moments in Grace reunited with Smile Empty Soul for a three-week tour of the Midwest and Northeast United States, from June 2–20, 2004, accompanied by Steriogram. The tour included a cross-over show with Shinedown on June 13, 2004, at the Starland Ballroom in Sayreville, New Jersey.

On June 15, 2004, Atlantic Records and Salad Days Records released "Stratus" as a digital and compact disc single; the release included an exclusive radio edit version of the song. On the same day, the two record labels also released a compact disc sampler, which included all three previously released songs from the band's forthcoming album: "Stratus", "Broken Promises" and "My Dying Day". The sampler managed to reach No. 2 on CMJ New Music Report's Loud College Rock Adds, No. 3 on Loud Rock Crucial Spins Add, and No. 14 on CMJ Top 200 Adds, on June 21, 2004.

The band was then invited to perform at the music showcase Millennium Music Conference, which took place at the Crowne Plaza hotel in Harrisburg, Pennsylvania on June 24, 2004. That same day, Vagrant Records announced that it would release the double-disc Various Artists compilation In Honor: A Compilation to Beat Cancer, benefiting cancer treatment organizations. Moments in Grace contributed the song "Curtain Call", which had already been released on These Days Will Fade. In Honor: A Compilation to Beat Cancer was eventually released by on September 21, 2004. Moments in Grace next joined Van's Warped Tour for a series of performances across the Southern and West Coast United States, from June 25 to July 11, 2004. The band played on the Punkrocks.net stage and held a giveaway contest in cooperation with Alternative Press, of prizes including iTunes gift certificates, iPods, and an Apple 14-inch iBook G4 to fans who signed up to its mailing list.

Following Van's Warped Tour, the band took advantage of a few days off to film a music video for the lead single "Stratus". The music video was filmed on July 17, 2004, with director Laurent Briet in Los Angeles, California. It premiered on August 12, 2004, five days before Moonlight Survived was released, and later aired on MTV and Fuse. On July 18, 2004, the band flew to Washington D.C. for a one-off show with The Honorary Title at Black Cat. The following day, on July 19, 2004, Moments in Grace was invited to MTV's Paramount Plaza studio for a photo shoot and video interview. From July 20 to August 12, 2004, Moments in Grace toured the East Coast and Midwest United States with Finger Eleven, Thornley and Strata.

=== Moonlight Survived (August 2004 – September 2004) ===
Moments in Grace's full-length album, Moonlight Survived, was released on compact disc and double 12-inch vinyl, and available for download, simultaneously on August 17, 2004, through Atlantic Records and Salad Days Records. In addition to the previously released songs "Stratus", "Broken Promises" and "My Dying Day", the album also included "The Patient", "We Feel the Songs", "My Stunning Bride", "Monologue", "Distant and Longing Night", "The Blurring Lines of Loss", "Don't Leave" and "The Past", as well as a re-recording of "No Angels", a song which had appeared on Postcard Audio's eponymous extended play. The double vinyl edition also included three bonus songs: "Curtain Call" and "The Silencing Truth", both taken from the extended play These Days Will Fade, and "Freedom", which was unavailable elsewhere. As with all of the band's prior releases, Moonlight Survived's artwork was designed by Shelby Cinca. All pre-orders placed through online retailer Smartpunk received a free copy of the band's split 7-inch vinyl with Funeral for a Friend. The song "Broken Promises" was also included in the Criterion Games / Electronic Arts racing video game, Burnout 3: Takedown, released on September 4, 2004.

In celebration of Moonlight Survived's release, Moments in Grace played three album-release shows accompanied by Taken From You. The first was held at The Handlebar in Pensacola, Florida on August 15, 2004; the second at Common Grounds Coffee House in Gainesville, Florida on August 17, 2004; and the third at Cafe Eleven in St. Augustine, Florida on August 18, 2004. Moonlight Survived peaked to No. 13 on CMJ's Top 200 Adds chart on August 30, 2004, and spent six weeks on CMJ's Radio 200 chart, peaking to No. 109 on October 11, 2004. In early September 2004, the band posted the song "These Days Will Fade", the only remaining unreleased recording from Moonlight Survived's sixteen-song session, as an exclusive on its PureVolume page.

=== Back on the road (August 2004 – December 2004) ===
Moments in Grace supported Seether for a one-off show at the UFC Arena in Orlando, Florida on August 28, 2004. A week later, the band was back on the road for two months-worth of shows. From September 3–13, 2004, the band played a mix of headlining and co-headlining dates in the South and West Coast of the United States. The co-headlining dates included shows with The Working Title and Mae in Charleston, South Carolina on September 3, 2004; Fear Before the March of Flames and A Thorn for Every Heart in Dallas, Texas on September 7, 2004; Colossal in Bakersfield, California on September 12, 2004; and The Kinison, Killradio and A Wilhelm Scream in Pomona, California on September 13, 2004.

The band next teamed up with Further Seems Forever, Brandtson and The Kicks for the "Hide Nothing Tour", which Moments in Grace joined from September 15 to October 4, 2004. The tour took the bands through the United States' West Coast (including a date in Western Canada), the Midwest and the East Coast. Another one-off show paired Moments in Grace with The Starting Line and Park in Tucson, Arizona on October 11, 2004, while the band travelled to meet up its next tour package.

For its final tour of the year, Moments in Grace teamed up with Hot Water Music for "The New What Next Tour", spanning six weeks from October 13 to November 21, 2004. The package tour also included Alexisonfire from October 13 to November 13; Don't Look Down from October 13–23; Planes Mistaken for Stars from October 23 to November 21; and Silverstein from November 15–21. Engine Down was initially to be on the tour but was replaced by Silverstein. The trip took the bands through the United States' West Coast, South and East Coast, followed by two dates in Canada, and finished in the American Midwest. It also included a stop to play The Fest 3 festival in Gainesville, Florida on October 31, 2004. A Various Artists sampler, including Moments in Grace's songs "Stratus" and "Broken Promises", as well as the music video for "Stratus" in an enhanced portion of the disc, was released simultaneously. The compact disc sampler also included songs and videos by Hot Water Music, Alexisonfire and Planes Mistaken for Stars.

On its way back home to Florida from the tour with Hot Water Music, Moments in Grace played two shows as part of clothing store Hollister Co.'s promotional event, "Club Cali Presents: The 12 Days of Rock". The clothing company held in-store concerts by thirteen bands over twelve days at various malls across the United States. Moments in Grace was the only band to perform two shows: the first at North Point Mall in Alpharetta, Georgia on November 29, 2004; and the second at The Mall at Millenia in Orlando, Florida on December 3, 2004.

=== Change in membership and final tours (December 2004 – March 2005) ===
In late 2004, Etheridge was replaced by James Glayat. Glayat had previously played in several bands with Kirkpatrick, including Shaft, Roosevelt and As Friends Rust. Moments in Grace next embarked on an American West Coast tour with Rock 'n' Roll Soldiers, spanning from January 15–25, 2005. The trip included dates in California, Arizona and Nevada, at such venues as Soma in San Diego, Troubadour in West Hollywood, GameWorks in Las Vegas and Cafe Du Nord in San Francisco.

A week-and-a-half later, Moments in Grace was back on the road for another American West Coast tour, this time with June and Zolof The Rock & Roll Destroyer, spanning from February 4–18, 2005. The tour was originally to include Halfwayhome, but due to changes in membership, the band had to pull out. Moments in Grace again played in California and Arizona on this tour, at such venues as GameWorks in Tucson, Knitting Factory in Hollywood, and Chain Reaction in Anaheim. The trip also included a one-off show with National Product and Take the Crown at Troubadour in West Hollywood on February 8, 2005.

Moments in Grace continued with several one-off headlining shows in late February and early March 2005, including the one-year anniversary party of webzine A Thousand Apologies in Tempe, Arizona on February 25, 2005. The band's next headlining show was on March 5, 2005, at Mr. Cue's Billiards in Lancaster, California with Saosin; it would be the band's final performance. At the time of Moments in Grace's break-up in early March 2005, the bands booking agency, Pinnacle Entertainment, was already in the midst of booking several more tours, including a headlining trek from March 25 to April 6, 2005, and dates on Van's Warped Tour in early August 2005.

== Discography ==
Studio albums

- Moonlight Survived (2004)

EPs

- Postcard Audio (2002)
- These Days Will Fade (2003)

== Members ==
Final lineup

- Jeremy Griffith – lead vocals, guitar, keyboards (2001–2005)
- Jake Brown – bass guitar, keyboards, backing vocals (2001–2005)
- Timothy Kirkpatrick – drums (2003–2005)
- James Glayat – guitar (2005)

Former members

- Jason Frazier – drums (2001–2002)
- Shane Gibson – guitar (2002)
- Brandon Cook – drums (2002–2003)
- Justin Etheridge – guitar, keyboards, backing vocals (2002–2004)
- TJ Stein – guitar (2004–2005)

=== Timeline ===
- ^{Note that the Studio album and EP bars represent the release dates, not the recording dates; membership sometimes changed between the two events.}
