= Moments in Grace discography =

Band discography

- Studio albums: 1
- EPs: 2
- Singles: 2
- Music videos: 1

The discography of Moments in Grace, an American alternative rock/post-hardcore band, includes one studio album, two extended plays, two singles and one music video. Under its original name, Postcard Audio, the band released an eponymous EP on compact disc in July 2002 through Computer Club Records. The band spent the next year writing its full-length album, Moonlight Survived, but changed name to Moments in Grace in June 2003, shortly before it was recorded.

While still named Postcard Audio, the band attracted the attention of record producer and Atlantic Records A&R representative Brian McTernan, who formed his own Atlantic Records imprint, Salad Days Records, specifically to release the band's music. Moments in Grace was properly introduced with These Days Will Fade, a free digital EP released by Salad Days Records on December 12, 2003, and later re-issued on compact disc by Atlantic Records on March 23, 2004. This was followed by a split 7-inch vinyl single with Funeral for a Friend, co-released by Atlantic Records, Salad Days Records, Mighty Atom Records and Infectious Records on April 20, 2004.

On June 15, 2004, Atlantic Records and Salad Days Records released "Stratus" as a digital and compact disc single. The band filmed a music video for the song two days later, which premiered on August 12, 2004, five days before Moonlight Survived was released. The band's only full-length album, Moonlight Survived, was released after considerable delay on August 17, 2004, on compact disc, double 12-inch vinyl and digitally through Atlantic Records and Salad Days Records.

== Albums ==
=== Studio albums ===
Title	Album details
Moonlight Survived	Released: August 17, 2004; Label: Atlantic / Salad Days

== Extended plays ==
Title	Album details
Postcard Audio	Released: July 2002; Label: Computer Club
These Days Will Fade	Released: December 12, 2003; Label: Atlantic / Salad Days

== Singles ==
Title	Album details
Funeral for a Friend / Moments in Grace (with Funeral for a Friend)	Released: April 20, 2004; Label: Atlantic / Salad Days / Mighty Atom / Infectious
"Stratus"	Released: June 15, 2004; Label: Atlantic / Salad Days

== Music videos ==
Title	Date	Director	Album
"Stratus"	August 12, 2004	Laurent Briet	Moonlight Survived

== Other appearances ==
Song	Year	Album	Label
"Don't Leave"	2004	Music With Attitude	Rock Sound
"Curtain Call"	2004	In Honor: A Compilation to Beat Cancer	Vagrant
"Broken Promises"	2004	Black Sampler	Atlantic
"Stratus" / "Broken Promises"	2004	Hot Water Music 2004 Tour Sampler	Atlantic
"Stratus"	2004	Flo Multizine	Flo
"Stratus"	2004	Get What You Want	WEA
