= Chemical Therapy =

American grunge band

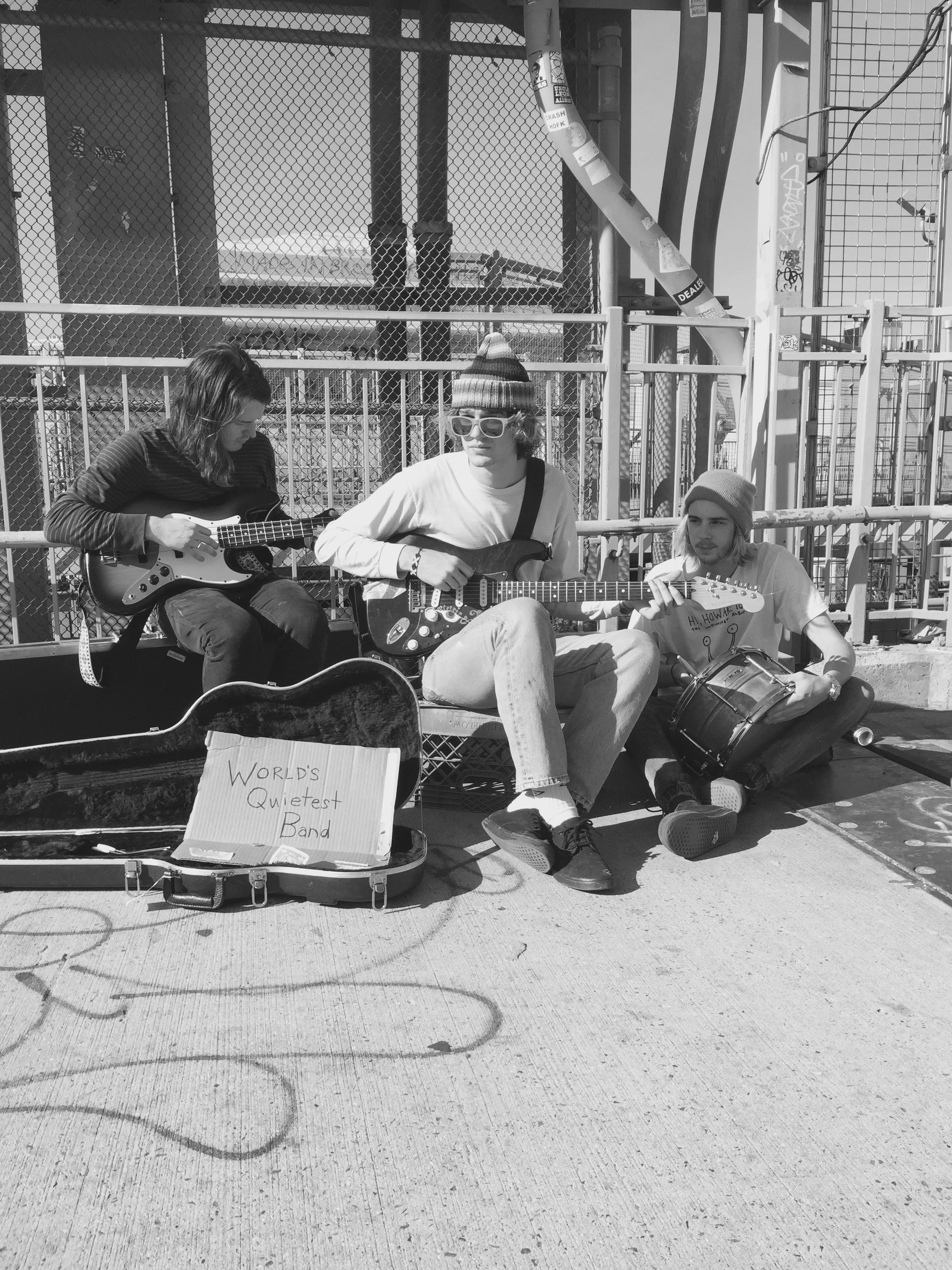

Background information
- Also known as: Heyrocco (2009-2023)
- Origin: Charleston, South Carolina, United States
- Genres: Pop rock, grunge, disney grunge, garage rock, alternative hiphop
- Years active: 2009–2024
- Labels: Old Flame Records (US); Vital Music Group (UK); Dine Alone Records (CA/NZ/AUS)
- Members: Nathan Merli; Christopher Cool; Tanner Cooper; Pat Mertens

Chemical Therapy is an American indie rock band from Charleston, South Carolina, United States, formed in 2009 under the name Heyrocco by guitarist/vocalist Nathan Merli, bassist Christopher Cool, and drummer Tanner Cooper. Heyrocco released their debut album, Teenage Movie Soundtrack, in June 2015 via Old Flame Records (US) and Vital Music Group (UK/Europe). In 2015, the band toured the UK/Europe behind their single release "Elsewhere" supporting UK artist The Xcerts along with a string of festival and headlining dates. The band has also toured with acts such as Grouplove, Surfer Blood, Mutemath, and Miniature Tigers. The band is currently being managed by Bedlam Music Management.

== History ==
Nathan Merli and Tanner Cooper met while attending the same middle school in Charleston. Christopher Cool became friends with the two in Jazz Band later on in high school. In an interview with punktastic.com the band stated, "We formed in Chris Cool's garage circa summer 2009 and from there we wrote and sucked, and wrote and sucked, and eventually started to suck a little less." The band name Heyrocco originated after Cool walked into his bedroom and found his pet turtle Rocco on his bed. Cool recalls saying, ""Heyyy, Rocco. Come on."

Heyrocco's first recording was a collection of demos that the band had recorded themselves titled Comfort released in April 2012. The LP was made with the help of a successful Kickstarter campaign in which the band raised over $4,000 from fans. Soon after Comfort was released the band recorded an EP titled Dark Summer which was never officially released, and recorded at Hello Telescope studios in Charleston by the record producer Josh Kaler. After roughly three years of touring all over the United States, Heyrocco played their first show overseas in October 2014 at the Cavern in Exeter, England.

On July 31, 2014, Heyrocco's single "Melt" was featured in Huw Stephens' BBC Radio 1 show. Their first EP, "Mom Jeans", was released in October 2014, featuring tracks culled from their debut full-length record. In November 2014 Heyrocco was chosen to appear for John Kennedy on a XFM X-posure session. The band saw further success in the UK when their single "Elsewhere" was selected by Zane Lowe as his February 2015 #FUTURER1 also on BBC Radio 1.

On June 2, 2015, the band released their debut album titled Teenage Movie Soundtrack following a successful winter UK tour which included a Sold-Out Headline slot at KOKO in London. The band has also, since then, played shows in both Germany and the Netherlands.

The band has cited Peter Silberman, Joel T. Hamilton, The Temper Trap, The Working Title, Steve Jordan, Tallest Man on Earth, The Cure, Radiohead, The Strokes, and Built to Spill as influences.

In 2017, the band moved to Los Angeles, California. In 2024, the band adopted the name Chemical Therapy after adding guitarist Pat Mertens.

== Discography ==
- Comfort (2012)
- Mom Jeans EP (2014)
- Teenage Movie Soundtrack (2015)
- Waiting On Cool EP (2016)
- Mexican Ashtray EP (2019)
