= Are You with Me (disambiguation) =

"Are You with Me" is a song originally recorded by Easton Corbin and later remixed by Lost Frequencies.

Are You with Me may also refer to:

- "Are You with Me" (The Potbelleez song)
- Are You with Me? (album), a 1996 album by Cowboy Mouth
- "Are You with Me", a song by Mickie James
- "Are You with Me", a song by Sixx:A.M. from This Is Gonna Hurt
- "Are You with Me", a song by Vaux from Beyond Virtue, Beyond Vice
- Are You with Me?, a book by Kouri Richens
