= There Must Be Some Way to Stop Them =

There Must be Some Way to Stop Them

Studio album by Vaux
- Released: April 1, 2003
- Genre: Post hardcore
- Length: 38:21
- Label: Volcom Entertainment

Vaux chronology
On Life; Living (2002)	There Must be Some Way to Stop Them (2003)	Plague Music (2004)

Professional ratings
Review scores
Source	Rating
AllMusic	3/5 stars
Drowned in Sound	7/10
Punknews.org	3.5/5 stars

There Must be Some Way to Stop Them is the first full-length album by the rock band Vaux. On the promo version of the album, the track "Ride Out Bitch" is called "Ride Out", and "On Love & Cars" is called "On Love And Cars".

== Track listing ==
1. "Set It to Blow" – 3:42
2. "On Love and Cars" – 2:54
3. "Fame" – 3:04
4. "Switched On" – 3:57
5. "At Your Will" – 3:38
6. "Ride Out Bitch" – 3:05
7. "Broke the Brakes" – 3:21
8. "Paint It Red" – 2:41
9. "Four Cornered Lives" – 4:03
10. "Do It for Sixty" – 2:13
11. "Shot in the Back" – 5:41
