= On Life; Living =

EP by Vaux
- Released: September 10, 2002
- Recorded: Unknown
- Genre: Post hardcore
- Length: 19:57
- Label: Volcom Entertainment

Vaux chronology
Audiblenarcotic (2000)	On Life; Living (2002)	There Must Be Some Way to Stop Them (2003)

Professional ratings
Review scores
Source	Rating
AllMusic	4/5 stars
Punknews.org	2.5/5 stars

On Life; Living is the first EP by the rock band Vaux. The first pressing of this EP was under their former name Eiffel.

== Track listing ==
1. "Everyday" – 5:59
2. "We Speed" – 5:07
3. "On" – 5:08
4. "To the End" – 3:43
