= Plague Music =

EP by Vaux
- Released: September 21, 2004
- Recorded: Unknown
- Genre: Post hardcore
- Length: 16:30
- Label: Equal Vision Records

Vaux chronology
There Must Be Some Way to Stop Them (2003)	Plague Music (2004)	Beyond Virtue, Beyond Vice (2006)

Professional ratings
Review scores
Source	Rating
Drowned in Sound	8/10
NeuFutur Magazine	7/10
Punknews.org	4/5 stars

Plague Music is the second EP by the rock band Vaux.

== Track listing ==
1. "Celibate Good Times" – 2:55
2. "RAID!" – 3:07
3. "Dearest Darkest" – 3:15
4. "Sex Will Happen Tonight" – 2:33
5. "Plague Music" – 4:40
