= Funeral for a Friend / Moments in Grace =

2004 split single by Funeral for a Friend and Moments in Grace

- Funeral for a Friend cover art.

Single by Funeral for a Friend and Moments in Grace
- Released: April 20, 2004
- Recorded: June 2003 – November 2003
- Studio: Chapel Studios, London; Miloco Studios, London; Rak Studios, London; Salad Days, Beltsville, Maryland; Soundtracks, New York City
- Genre: Alternative rock; emo; post-hardcore
- Length: 6:39
- Label: Atlantic; Infectious; Mighty Atom; Salad Days
- Producer(s): Colin Richardson; Brian McTernan

Funeral for a Friend singles chronology
"Seven Ways to Scream Your Name" (2003)	"Funeral for a Friend / Moments in Grace" (2004)	"Hours" (2005)

Moments in Grace singles chronology
"These Days Will Fade" (2003)	"Funeral for a Friend / Moments in Grace" (2004)	"Moonlight Survived" (2004)

Cover art
- Moments in Grace cover art.

Funeral for a Friend / Moments in Grace is a split single by Bridgend, Wales, post-hardcore band Funeral for a Friend and St. Augustine, Florida, alternative rock / post-hardcore band Moments in Grace. It was co-released as a clear-colored 7-inch vinyl by Atlantic Records, Salad Days Records, Mighty Atom Records and Infectious Records on April 20, 2004.

The split was released in promotion of an American tour that the two bands shared in April 2004, accompanied by Avenged Sevenfold and My Chemical Romance. Funeral for a Friend's song, "Bullet Theory", was previously released on the band's debut full-length album Casually Dressed & Deep in Conversation, while Moments in Grace's song, "My Dying Day", was scheduled to appear on the band's forthcoming debut full-length album Moonlight Survived. At the time of the split's release, neither song had been officially released in the United States.

== Composition and recording ==
Moments in Grace's contribution, "My Dying Day", was one of sixteen songs that the band recorded for its full-length album, Moonlight Survived. The album was recorded over the span of two months, from June to August 2003, with producer Brian McTernan at his Salad Days studio in Beltsville, Maryland. Unhappy with the way Moonlight Survived sounded, the band returned to Salad Days in November 2003 to re-record some of the material, record a couple of extra songs, and fully re-mix the release.

== Release and packaging ==
Funeral for a Friend's "Bullet Theory" had already been released on the band's debut album Casually Dressed & Deep in Conversation through Mighty Atom Records in the United Kingdom, but had yet to be officially released in the United States.

On the other hand, Moments in Grace's "My Dying Day" had not been released, though it was scheduled to appear on the band's forthcoming debut album Moonlight Survived, originally planned for release in May 2004, but ultimately delayed until August 17, 2004.

The split 7-inch vinyl was co-released through Atlantic Records, Salad Days Records, Mighty Atom Records and Infectious Records, on April 20, 2004. In promotion of the release, webzine Ultimate Guitar held a giveaway contest for five winners to receive a record and a signed poster.

When Moonlight Survived was eventually released, all pre-orders placed through online retailer Smartpunk received a free copy of the split 7-inch vinyl.

== Touring ==
The split 7-inch vinyl was released in promotion of an American tour shared by Funeral for a Friend and Moments in Grace. At the time, Moments in Grace was on a lengthy six-week tour of the East Coast, South and West Coast of the United States with Avenged Sevenfold, from April 16 to May 24, 2004. The tour also included My Chemical Romance from April 16 to May 14. Funeral for a Friend joined in from April 17–23, following several weeks of shows with Coheed and Cambria.

== Track listing ==
Credits are adapted from the single's liner notes.

Side A: Funeral for a Friend
No.	Title	Length
1.	"Bullet Theory"	3:53

Side B: Moments in Grace
No.	Title	Length
1.	"My Dying Day"	2:46
Total length:		6:39

== Personnel ==
Credits are adapted from the single's liner notes.

=== Funeral for a Friend ===
Funeral for a Friend

- Matt Davies – lead vocals
- Gareth Davies – bass guitar, backing vocals
- Kris Roberts – guitars
- Darran Smith – guitars
- Ryan Richards – drums, screamed vocals

Production

- Colin Richardson – recording engineer, mixing engineer and producer at Chapel Studios, Rak Studios and Miloco Studios
- Matt Hyde – recording engineer
- Will Bartle – recording engineer
- Richard Woodcraft – recording engineer
- Funeral for a Friend – co-producer
- Howie Weinberg – mastering engineer at Masterdisk

=== Moments in Grace ===
Moments in Grace

- Jeremy Griffith – vocals, guitar, keyboards, organ, piano
- Justin Etheridge – guitar
- Jake Brown – bass guitar
- Timothy Kirkpatrick – drums

Production

- Brian McTernan – recording engineer, mixing engineer and producer at Salad Days
- Pedro Aida – assistant recording engineer at Salad Days
- Matt Squire – Pro Tools engineer at Salad Days
- Michael Barbiero – mixing engineer at Soundtracks
- George Marino – mastering engineer at Sterling Sound
- Shelby Cinca – artwork
