= Raised on Whipped Cream =

Raised On Whipped Cream

Studio album by Killradio
- Released: September 7, 2004
- Recorded: 2003 in California
- Genre: Punk rock
- Length: 42:42
- Label: Columbia
- Producer: Rick Parker

Killradio chronology
Raised On Whipped Cream (2004)	Good Americans (2008)

Professional ratings
Review scores
Source	Rating
AllMusic	2.5/5 stars

Raised on Whipped Cream is the debut studio album by American punk rock band Killradio, released on September 7, 2004 by Columbia Records. It featured the single "Do You Know (Knife in Your Back)". The music revolves around a broad range of social commentary (i.e., from criticism of the Iraq war to modern radio programming).

== Track listing ==
All songs written by Killradio

1. "A.M.E.R.I.K.A."
2. "Scavenger"
3. "Do You Know (Knife in Your Back)"
4. "Pull Out"
5. "Entertained"
6. "Penis Envy"
7. "Freedom?"
8. "Where Go We"
9. "Burning the Water Brown"
10. "Ad Jam"
11. "Classroom Blues"
12. "Raised On Whipped Cream"
13. "Feeding the Rich (Bonus Track)"

== Credits and personnel ==
- Brandon Jordan - Vocals, guitar
- Jasten King - Guitar, backing vocals
- Dirty - Bass
- Duke - Drums, backing vocals
