= Be Well =

American hardcore punk band

- Origin: Baltimore, Maryland, U.S.
- Genres: Hardcore punk, melodic hardcore, post-hardcore
- Years active: 2019–present
- Labels: Equal Vision
- Members: Brian McTernan; Aaron Dalbec; Shane Johnson; Mike Schleibaum; Peter Tsouras

Be Well is an American hardcore punk band, formed in 2019 in Baltimore, Maryland. The group included members from Bane, Only Crime, Darkest Hour, Fairweather, Ashes, Battery, Olympia, Beasts of No Nation, and Converge. The group signed to Equal Vision Records in December 2019 and released an album, The Weight and the Cost, in August 2020.

== Band members ==
- Brian McTernan – lead vocals (2019–present)
- Aaron Dalbec – bass (2019–present)
- Shane Johnson – drums (2019–present)
- Mike Schleibaum – guitar (2019–present)
- Peter Tsouras – guitar (2019–present)

== Studio albums ==
| Title | Album details | Peak chart positions |
|---|---|---|
| The Weight and the Cost | Released: August 21, 2020; Label: Equal Vision Records End Hits Records; Format: CD, CS, DL, LP | — |

== Extended plays ==
| Title | Album details | Peak chart positions |
|---|---|---|
| Be Well | Released: December 4, 2019; Label: Equal Vision Records; Format: DL, LP | — |
