= Stratus (song) =

2004 single by Moments in Grace

Single by Moments in Grace

from the album Moonlight Survived
- A-side: "Stratus (Radio Edit)"
- B-side: "Stratus (Album Version)"
- Released: June 15, 2004
- Recorded: June 2003 – November 2003
- Studio: Salad Days, Beltsville, Maryland; Soundtracks, New York City
- Genre: Alternative rock; post-hardcore
- Length: 3:39 (Radio Edit); 4:13 (Album Version); 4:08 (EP Version)
- Label: Atlantic; Salad Days
- Songwriter: Moments in Grace
- Producer: Brian McTernan

Music video
- Video on YouTube

"Stratus" is a song by American alternative rock / post-hardcore band Moments in Grace, released on June 15, 2004. It was produced by Brian McTernan and distributed in the United States by Atlantic Records and Salad Days Records. The song was the first and only single from the band's debut full-length album, Moonlight Survived. On June 21, 2004, the song reached No. 2 on CMJ New Music Report's Loud College Rock, No. 3 on Loud Rock Crucial Spins, and No. 14 on CMJ Top 200. The single helped Moonlight Survived peak to No. 13 on CMJ's Top 200 chart on August 30, 2004, and the album spent six weeks on CMJ's Radio 200 chart, peaking to No. 109 on October 11, 2004.

On July 17, 2004, Moments in Grace filmed a music video for the song with director Laurent Briet in Los Angeles, California. The video premiered on August 12, 2004, five days before Moonlight Survived was released, and later aired on MTV and Fuse. Two days after the video's filming, on July 19, 2004, Moments in Grace was invited to MTV's Paramount Plaza studio for a photo shoot and video interview promoting the single. The track was regularly performed on the band's 2003–2005 promotional tour.

== Track listing ==
No.	Title	Length
1.	"Stratus (Radio Edit)"	3:39
2.	"Stratus (Album Version)"	4:13
Total length:		7:52

== Personnel ==
Credits are adapted from the single's liner notes.

Moments in Grace

- Jeremy Griffith – vocals, guitar, keyboards, organ, piano
- Justin Etheridge – guitar
- Jake Brown – bass guitar
- Timothy Kirkpatrick – drums

Guest musicians

- Teri Lazar – violin
- Kim Miller – violin
- Osman Kivrak – viola
- Lisa Ferebee – cello
- Greg Watkins – double bass

Production

- Brian McTernan – recording engineer, mixing engineer and producer at Salad Days
- Pedro Aida – assistant recording engineer at Salad Days
- Matt Squire – Pro Tools engineer at Salad Days
- Michael Barbiero – mixing engineer at Soundtracks
- George Marino – mastering engineer at Sterling Sound
- Charlie Barnett – string arranger
- Shelby Cinca – artwork and art direction at Passkontrol
- Gabriel Baldessin – artwork and art direction at Passkontrol

== Charts ==
Chart (2004)	Peak position
US CMJ Top 200 (CMJ New Music Report)	14
US Loud College Rock (CMJ New Music Report)	2
US Loud Rock Crucial Spins (CMJ New Music Report)	3
