= In Honor: A Compilation to Beat Cancer =

Compilation album by Various artists
- Released: September 21, 2004
- Genre: Alternative / punk
- Length: Vagrant

Professional ratings
Review scores
| Source | Rating |
|---|---|
| Allmusic | link |

In Honor: A Compilation to Beat Cancer is a double-disc Various Artists compilation album released by Vagrant Records on September 21, 2004. The release was first announced on June 24, 2004, and was promoted as a benefit album for cancer treatment organizations the Syrentha Savio Endowment and the Sean McGrath Fund. The release features a great deal of previously unreleased material.

== Track listing ==
Disc One
| No. | Title | Artist | Length |
|---|---|---|---|
| 1. | "Intro" | Dicky Barrett |
| 2. | "One More Day" | The Descendents |
| 3. | "Coming Out of Nowhere" | Face to Face |
| 4. | "Kiss the Bottle" (Live) | Jawbreaker |
| 5. | "Mass as Shadows" (Rare) | Thursday |
| 6. | "Mix Tapes/Cell Mates" | Rocky Votolato |
| 7. | "Don't Go Outside" | Saves the Day |
| 8. | "True Believers" (Live) | The Bouncing Souls |
| 9. | "They Got Milkshakes" | None More Black |
| 10. | "Naked Raygun" | Avoid One Thing |
| 11. | "The Hey Man" | Emanuel |
| 12. | "Headfirst for Halos" (Live) | My Chemical Romance |
| 13. | "Not in My Name" | Majority Rule |
| 14. | "In the Corner" | Seconds to Go |
| 15. | "Paper, Rock, Scissors" (Acoustic) | JamisonParker |
| 16. | "Every Great Western" | The A.K.A.s |
| 17. | "Existentialism on Prom Night" | Straylight Run |
| 18. | "The War" (Piano Version) | Mêlée |
| 19. | "You Can't Make New Old Friends" | Dolour |
| 20. | "Open Books" | Somerset |
| 21. | "Vila Rada" | Nikola Šarčević |

Disc Two
| No. | Title | Artist | Length |
|---|---|---|---|
| 1. | "Stare at the Sun" (Acoustic) | Thrice |
| 2. | "I Hate This Stupid Bike" | The Foreign Exchange (w/ Sean McGrath of Saves The Day) |
| 3. | "Waste Your Time" | Piebald |
| 4. | "You're So Last Summer" (Acoustic) | Taking Back Sunday |
| 5. | "Don't Ask Don't Tell" | Recover |
| 6. | "Your Good Years" | Down to Earth Approach |
| 7. | "Drive Drive Drive" | Name Taken |
| 8. | "My Favorite Accident" (Acoustic) | Motion City Soundtrack |
| 9. | "The Rundown" | Gatsby's American Dream |
| 10. | "Burning House" | Despistado |
| 11. | "Red Is the New Black" (Live) | Funeral for a Friend |
| 12. | "Hands of Failure" | Only Crime |
| 13. | "Should Have Stayed in the Shallows" | Fear Before the March of Flames |
| 14. | "Curtain Call" | Moments in Grace |
| 15. | "On the Air" | The Casket Lottery |
| 16. | "Jane" | The Loved Ones |
| 17. | "Rioux" | Kicked in the Head |
| 18. | "Fresh Kill" (Live) | Paint It Black |
| 19. | "The Desert Is On Fire" | Murder By Death |
| 20. | "Houston, We Have Uh Oh" | Minus the Bear |
| 21. | "Moment Without an End" | Big D and the Kids Table |
