= Beyond Virtue, Beyond Vice =

Studio album by Vaux
- Released: August 1, 2006
- Genre: Rock
- Length: 46:31
- Label: Vx
- Producer: Jacknife Lee

Vaux chronology
Plague Music (2004)	Beyond Virtue, Beyond Vice (2006)

Professional ratings
Review scores
Source	Rating
Allmusic	4/5 stars
Punknews.org	3.5/5 stars
V13 Media	6.5/10

Beyond Virtue, Beyond Vice is the second and final full-length album by the American rock band Vaux. The album was supposed to be the band's major label debut and was due for release on November 8, 2005. However, Vaux severed ties with Atlantic. The band then released the album themselves which was available to purchase on their last headlining tour and is available on their webstore in limited quantities.

== Track listing ==
1. "Identity Theft" – 4:14
2. "Are You with Me?" – 3:28
3. "Cocaine James" – 3:20
4. "Need to Get By" – 3:48
5. "A Simple Man" – 3:33
6. "The Last Report From..." – 4:15
7. "Never Better" – 4:20
8. "The Rope, the Pistol, the Candlestick" – 4:34
9. "Don't Wait" – 3:53
10. "Burn the Bandwagon" – 3:29
11. "To the Nines" – 2:40
12. "Van Fong" – 4:57
