= National Product =

- Origin: Oahu, Hawaii, U.S.
- Genres: Rock; Post-hardcore; Pop-rock
- Years active: 1998-2007
- Members: Danny Casler - vocals Rob Caveney - drums Stan Moniz - guitar Jeff Feuerhaken - guitar Nathan Elliott - bass/vocals Previous members: Dan Niles - keyboard/guitars Zill C. DeVille - bass Joey Kaimana - bass Kevin Read - bass
- Website: myspace.com/nationalproduct

National Product is a little-known rock band from Oahu, Hawaii.

== History ==
National Product began playing local gigs while attending Kalaheo High School, and moved to California in 2000. Soon afterwards, most of the members left lead singer Danny Casler in California. In California, they reformed with same lineup and added lead guitarist Jeffrey Feuerhaken. 2003.

In 2005, they contributed a remake of the song "Disarm" to the obscure Smashing Pumpkins tribute album, Shot Full of Diamonds. They played the Warped Tour in 2005 as well as 2006.

In 2007, the group signed with R&M Artist Records, run by Mark Mazzetti (formerly of A&M Records) and Randy Delano, who signed the band as their "flagship group." National Product was the only group (alongside four solo artists) signed to R&M Records, which went under later that year.

National Product toured Canada with Saosin, Poison the Well, Panic Division, and Flight 409, during which tour they survived a fiery van crash.

Their album Luna was released on August 7, 2007, produced by James Paul Wisner (Underoath, Dashboard Confessional, Paramore). The lead single from the album was "Love Me." They produced a music video for their song "By All Means".

The album was a commercial and critical flop. Writing for Allmusic, music critic Stewart Mason noted lead singer Danny Casler's "anonymous voice" and "rote lyrics," calling the band "unimaginative," "inert" and "deathly boring." He concluded the 2.5/5 star review by calling the album "so terminally bland that it's not even possible to dislike it with enthusiasm."

== Departure of Dan Niles ==
"We the members of NP regret to inform you that Dan Niles "The Danimal" (keyboards/acoustic guitar/rad dude) has decided to part ways with the band. We are all very saddened by his departure, but he has built a great name for himself as a graphics designer and has chosen to continue down that path in his life. We all wish him the best of luck in his career and we'll all miss him greatly. Below you will find comments from each one of us on his departure. As always if you have any questions please don't hesitate to ask, but if you are just looking for dirt don't bother, there is none. National Product will continue full steam ahead and we've decided to remain a 5 piece for the time being. If you are a dedicated musician and think you have something to add to this project, please let us know and if we ever decide to explore having another member we may hit you up. Thank you all for your continued support" National Product was unsuccessful in each of its future projects, and went on permanent hiatus.

Casler once performed guest vocals for punk rock band Pennywise.

== Discography ==
- Luna (R&M Artist Records, August 7, 2007)
