= Vaux (band) =

American alternative rock band

- Also known as: Eiffel (1997–2002)
- Origin: Denver, Colorado, United States
- Genres: Alternative rock; Post-hardcore
- Years active: 1997–2007
- Labels: Undecided; Volcom; Music for Nations; Equal Vision; Lava; Atlantic; Vx; Outlook
- Members: Quentin Smith; Joe McChan; Adam Tymn; Chris Sorensen; Greg Daniels; Ryder Robison

Vaux was an American six-piece alternative rock band from Denver, Colorado, United States.

== History ==
Vaux was formed in 1997 in Denver, Colorado, under the original name Eiffel. They released a 7" single themselves, To Write A Symphony, in 1998. Indie label Undecided Records signed the band after they had toured the East Coast extensively for two years, and the band's debut album Audiblenarcotic was released in 2000. The album was a minor success on college radio, and the band earned a spot on the 2001 Warped Tour. In July 2002, for legal reasons, the band had to change its name, deciding on Vaux.

In 2002, Vaux moved to Orange County independent label Volcom Entertainment and released the EP On Life; Living, and the following year, second full-length There Must Be Some Way to Stop Them. The album received widespread critical acclaim, prompting Alternative Press magazine to include Vaux in their 100 Bands to Watch feature. During this time, the band embarked upon successful tours supporting Thrice, My Chemical Romance, Coheed and Cambria and The Used.

In January 2004 Vaux signed to major label Atlantic Records's then subsidiary imprint Lava Records. Shortly after, the band released a 5-song EP, Plague Music, on Equal Vision Records. The band's major label debut, Beyond Virtue, Beyond Vice was due for release on November 8, 2005. However, in October 2005, Lava Records head Jason Flom was fired and the band's management quit. At the end of the month, Vaux was dropped from Atlantic for unclear reasons. After six months, the band regained control of the album masters. The band then released the album themselves via Outlook Records, which was also available to purchase on their last headlining tour and was available on their webstore in limited quantities.

On Tuesday, 22 August 2006, the song Are You With Me was released as the Single of the Week in the iTunes Music Store. It also featured in the 2010 film From Paris With Love.

Citing "lost momentum" the band announced their split in 2007. Their final show was on July 28, 2007 at the Bluebird Theater in Denver, CO.

=== Status ===
- Beyond Virtue, Beyond Vice was released conjunctively through Outlook Music and the band's own Vx Records label on August 1, 2006.
- On July 28, 2007 the band played their last show together in Denver, Colorado at the Bluebird Theater. Former bassist Ryder re-joined them for the last concert which also featured the bands Casket Salesmen, The Epilogues and Moccasin. They have plans to release a 5-song EP in the near future, and have said that the album is around 30 minutes long.

== Members ==
- Quentin Smith - vocals
- Chris Sorensen - guitar
- Adam Tymn - guitar
- Greg Daniels - guitar/keyboards
- Ryder Robison - bass
- Joe McChan - drums

== Discography ==
=== Albums ===
- Audiblenarcotic (under the name Eiffel) (2000), Undecided
- There Must Be Some Way to Stop Them (2003), Volcom
- Beyond Virtue, Beyond Vice (2006), Vx Records, Outlook

=== EPs ===
- On Life; Living (2002), Volcom
- Plague Music (2004), Equal Vision

=== Singles ===
- "To Write A Symphony" 7" (under the name Eiffel) (1998) (self-released)
- "Are You With Me" (2006), Vx Records
- "Cocaine James" (2006), Vx Records
