= Artist development deal =

Musical recording artist development contract

An artist development deal (also known as a demo deal) is a recording artist contract with a record label or music publisher that promises to develop the skills and public profile of the artist. In exchange for development support, the recording label or publisher receives a right to future high royalties or other desirable rights. These types of deals are sometimes most helpful to the artist, but the label often takes control of the artist's management and publishing rights. Historically, such deals have been abused by both labels and managers.
