= Killradio =

Punk rock band from Los Angeles

- Origin: Northridge, Los Angeles, California, United States
- Genres: Punk rock
- Years active: 2001–2009, 2017-present
- Labels: Columbia
- Members: Brandon Jordan; Dirty; Duke; Jasten King
- Past members: Bird
- Website: facebook.com/killradioofficial

Killradio is an American punk rock band formed in 2001 in Northridge, Los Angeles, California, United States. They used a mix of music styles, including hardcore, post-punk, ska, funk, and hip-hop. The band officially disbanded in 2009, while the members have remained active in the Los Angeles music scene. In early 2017, Killradio announced that they were reforming with their classic lineup.

== Biography ==
Coming together from earlier projects, Brandon Jordan, Todd Bondy and 'The Duke' formed Killradio around 2000 in Southern California. The band name originated in the idea that radio programming, especially in the rock format, had lost touch with its original purpose: to give fans access to the musicians of their time. Becoming 'commercialized', radio programming increasingly curtailed artist creativity, opted for concisely packaged jingles, familiar themes / song structures, and tended to play a very small selection of songs from a small selection of bands. Killradio, in turn, envisioned their music as an act of 'ad jamming', art as not only an aesthetic but also a political act committed to undermining the corporatization / routinization of the rock / punk art movement.

The band played local shows in the Los Angeles and Ventura County area, and put out a few releases independently and on small labels before being picked up by a major and releasing 'Raised on Whipped Cream'. The album cover, a baby sucking on a bottle of whipped cream, was a frequent target of critical reviews, though the music itself was widely praised and led to Killradio touring with bands like Lostprophets, playing on the Warped Tour, and being a featured new artist on LA-based radio station KROQ's annual CD. The music is an eclectic mix of punk, rock, ska and funk. The band released a music video for the album track, Do You Know? (Knife in Your Back) which features Matt Pinfield. The band toured extensively throughout North America.

In 2006-2007, the band returned to the studio to record a second album. Due to personal issues, the album was never finished and KillRadio eventually dissolved after a final farewell tour on the West Coast. An EP of the recorded tracks for the second album was released in late 2008 under 9/12 Records.

The band has gone through a number of musicians. Originally, Brandon Jordan played in a rock outfit with Todd Bondy, John Haskell and Tommy Bavardos called 'A Cloud Nine Project'. After a long hiatus, Brandon and Todd came back together under 'Killradio' with 'The Duke' and Jasten (guitar), the music taking on the signature style and energy that Killradio became known for. Brandon Jordan wrote the majority of the songs, though Todd Bondy also was often involved in the song writing process. Since the dissolution of Killradio, most of the members have remained active to varying degrees in the music scene - in particular, 'The Duke' has played in a number of bands, including 'Nancy Fullforce' with Jasten, and 'French Exit.' Brandon Jordan currently plays solo shows in the greater Los Angeles area and has formed a new band, "Crime Rock".

Following the election of Donald Trump in 2016, the classic lineup of Killradio decided to reunite, and began posting live streams of their practices on Brandon Jordan's Facebook page. The new single Same Shit, Different Toilet was released somewhere in the summer of 2017, and their first live show in years was scheduled in Los Angeles for the end of June. The band released their new EP "This Land Is Our Land?" on 21 June 2019.

== Band members ==
=== Current ===
- Brandon Jordan – lead vocals, guitar
- Dirty – bass guitar, backing vocals
- Sergio "Duke" Reyes – drums
- Jasten King – guitar

=== Former ===
- Bird – guitar

== Discography ==
=== Studio albums ===
| Year | Title | Label | Format | Other information |
|---|---|---|---|---|
| 2003 | eMpTy-V Generation (EP) | | CD | Self-released EP. |
| 2004 | Off With His Head (EP) | | CD | Four track EP. |
| 2004 | Raised on Whipped Cream | Columbia | CD | First album. |
| 2008 | Good Americans (EP) | Nine 12 Records | CD, Digital Release (iTunes) | First studio release in four years. |
| 2019 | This Land Is Our Land? (EP) | KR Records | | |
| 2020 | Election Year | KR Records | | |

=== Singles ===
| Song | Album | Year |
|---|---|---|
| "Do You Know (Knife In Your Back)" | Raised On Whipped Cream | 2004 |
| "Scavenger" | Raised On Whipped Cream | 2004 |
| "Same Shit, Different Toilet" | Non-Album Release | 2017 |

=== Videos ===
- Do You Know (Knife In Your Back)
- Scavenger

=== Video game appearances ===
| Song | Game | Year |
|---|---|---|
| "Do You Know (Knife In Your Back)" | ATV Offroad Fury 3 | 2004 |
| "Scavenger" | Need for Speed: Underground 2 | 2004 |
| "Do You Know (Knife In Your Back)" | ATV Offroad Fury: Blazin' Trails | 2005 |

== Touring ==
Killradio toured extensively, most notably throughout the California and Ontario, Canada regions. They have shared the stage with bands such as Zebrahead, Mindless Self Indulgence, Jello Biafra, Moneen, Rise Against, Coheed and Cambria, Alexisonfire, and Billy Talent. In addition, they have been featured on the Warped Tour.
