= Rock 'n' Roll Soldiers =

American punk rock band

- Origin: Eugene, Oregon, US
- Genres: Garage rock; punk
- Years active: 1997– 2008
- Labels: Gearhead; East West
- Members: Marty Larson-Xu; Kevin Sciou; Evan Sernoffsky; Oliver Brown

Rock 'n' Roll Soldiers was an American punk rock band from Eugene, Oregon.

== History ==
In 1997, the band was formed in Eugene, Oregon by four friends who met there in middle school. They named their group—of frontman Marty Larson-Xu, guitarist Kevin Sciou, bassist Evan Sernoffsky, and drummer Oliver Brown—after a Radio Birdman concert tour of the same name. The band's early music tended to focus on the band's hometown and their dissatisfaction therewith; MTV described this work as punk (modeled after the Stooges and Radio Birdman) and garage rock (à la the Sonics)

Rock 'N' Roll Soldiers waded into professional performances with West-Coast openings for the Donnas and New Bomb Turks. After the band signed with Gearhead Records, for whom they produced two vinyl extended plays (EP), they signed to East West Records and rereleased those two EPs as a 37-minute punk album: The Two EPs. By 2005, the band was "touring constantly" and polishing their next album, So Many Musicians to Kill (expected spring 2006).

== Music ==
The band's first EP is The High School Sessions, and the second is Weak Blame the Strong.

When East West requested the band to change their name from Rock 'n' Roll Soldiers, the band recorded "Anthem" in protest; the 154-second lead single from The Two EPs proclaims six times in the chorus, "We're the motherfucking Rock 'n' Roll Soldiers". MTV's James Montgomery praised its punk music aesthetic, saying it "sounds like it was recorded on masking tape, dropped on the floor and then flushed down the toilet. The end result is skuzzy, sleazy punk tailored for drinking, fighting and tattooing". In 2005, Jeff Inman with Las Vegas CityLife concurred, claiming that only Larson-Xu's profanities kept "Anthem" from "selling iPods by the thousands."

=== Discography ===
The High School Sessions

- Format: Vinyl
- Label: Gearhead

Weak Blame the Strong

- Format: Vinyl
- Label: Gearhead

The Two EPs

- Label: East West
- Singles: "Anthem"
