= Noise Ratchet =

- Origin: San Diego, California, US
- Genres: Alternative rock, post-grunge, power pop, emo
- Years active: 1997–2004; 2024–present
- Label: The Militia Group
- Members: Joel Hosler; Brandon Young; Danny Lothspeich; Jon Jameson; Roger Molina
- Past members: Evan White; Rick Savercool

Noise Ratchet is an alternative rock band originating from Southern California.

Noise Ratchet began as a pop punk/ska band in February 1997 in San Diego, California. In 1998, they released their first independent album, Never Going Back, at Youth Wave 1998 while opening for P.O.D. The Supertones, Stavesacre. In 1999, the band's original drummer, Richard Savercool left the band and drummer Brandon Young filled this vacancy. At the same time, guitarist Roger Molina was also added to the lineup. In 2002 they released their album Till We Have Faces on The Militia Group label, which won San Diego’s 2002 award for Best Recording. In promotion of this album, Noise Ratchet toured with several acts, including Dashboard Confessional and Switchfoot.

In 2003, the band released a self-titled EP, an assemblage of five new songs and a revamped version of the acoustic "A Way to the Heart", which originally appeared on Till We Have Faces. In 2003 they signed with Rick Rubin's Major Label American Recordings. and in Dec 2003 they went in the studio to record their major-label debut with producer Nick Raskulinecz (Foo Fighters, Superdrag, Danzig, Queens of the Stone Age, Paramore). They finished the record in March 2004, but in the midst of recording their label broke contract with Island Def Jam and funding for the album was cut off. With no money to mix and master the album, it was shelved. Touring the rest of 2004 with no tour support, the members parted ways in November 2004. Hosler, Jameson and Young started a side project called The Life, which never released an album and soon after Jameson and Young went on to form Delta Spirit. Molina is a professional hair stylist in SoCal, and Hosler owns Seven C Music in St. Petersburg, Florida.

In 2024, Noise Ratchet announced their reunion for Furnace Fest in Birmingham, Alabama. In June the following year, the band self-released an EP titled Who We Are, followed by the full-length album Freedom in October.

== Original members ==
- Danny Lothspeich - guitar, vocals
- Joel Hosler - bass, vocals
- Richard Savercool - drums, vocals

== Later members ==
- Roger Molina - guitar
- Danny Lothspeich - guitar
- Joel Hosler - vocals
- Jon Jameson - bass
- Brandon Young - drums
- Evan White - guitar

== Discography ==
- Why We Cry (Akita Records, 2000)
- Till We Have Faces (The Militia Group, 2002)
- Noise Ratchet (The Militia Group, 2003)
- Who We Are (Noise Ratchet Records, 2025)
- Freedom (Noise Ratchet Records, 2025)
