= A Thorn for Every Heart =

American post-hardcore band

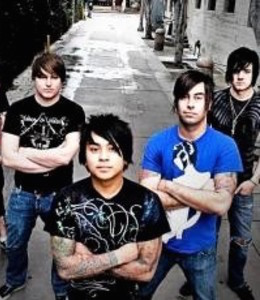
- A Thorn for Every Heart c. 2007. From left to right: Justin Powell, Phil Nguyen, Kelvin Cruz, Casey Hill

Background information
- Origin: Chino Hills, California, U.S.
- Genres: Post-hardcore, emo, alternative rock
- Years active: 2003-2009, 2013–present
- Label: Kickball / Interscope / Universal Music Group
- Members: Kelvin Cruz; Jeff Harber; Phil Nguyen; Justin Powell; James Forsberg
- Past members: Aaron Peck; Joy Welling; Matt Mallouk; Tyler Mahurin; Casey Hill; Ryan Warrell; Matt Thorsen; Joel Holt

A Thorn for Every Heart (often abbreviated to ATFEH) is an American post-hardcore band from Chino Hills, California.

== History ==
A Thorn for Every Heart was started in early 2003 by Joel Ryan Holt (guitar) and Aaron Peck (drums). The original lineup of Holt, Peck, Kelvin Cruz (lead vocals), Jeff Harber (guitar, keys, backing vocals), Justin Powell (bass), and Joy Welling (violin) independently released their debut EP, Silence Is Golden, in late 2003. The EP gained them internet exposure and created an underground following, leading to talks of a record deal with Interscope. Due to musical differences, Holt (guitar/band co-founder) and ATFEH parted ways, and long-time friend Phil Nguyen joined the band in Holt's place. In support of the EP, ATFEH embarked on their first nationwide tour in 2004, during which Welling (violin) parted ways with the band due to personal differences. The band never replaced the violinist or added any other full-time instruments to the group's sound. ATFEH recorded their first full-length album, Things Aren't So Beautiful Now, with producer Shawn Sullivan (Bleeding Through, Reel Big Fish) in the summer of 2004. The album, featuring five reworked songs from the EP and five new songs, was released on October 19, 2004, through Interscope's subsidiary, Kickball Records. After recording the album, Peck (drums/band co-founder) also parted ways with the band, leaving the permanent drummer position open for a year afterward.

Over the next few years, ATFEH toured around the United States as both supporting band and headlining band, such as on their headlining tour in March 2006 sponsored by Purevolume. Openers have included From First to Last, Hit the Lights, and Boys Like Girls. ATFEH also toured with such bands as Fall Out Boy, Jimmy Eat World, Head Automatica, Taking Back Sunday, Emery, Boys Night Out, My American Heart, The Receiving End of Sirens, A Static Lullaby, and more. They played many festivals, such as Surf & Skate (2004), The Bamboozle (2005, 2006, Bamboozle Left 2006), and two years of The Vans Warped Tour (2004, 2005). In 2005, they self-recorded (via their bassist and notable producer Justin Powell) two cover songs for major compilation releases: Oingo Boingo's "Dead Man's Party" for the Punk Goes 80s compilation, and "Jellybelly" for The Killer in You: A Tribute to Smashing Pumpkins. Tyler Mahurin (A Static Lullaby, Hollywood Undead) was added as official drummer in 2005. ATFEH also appeared on Fuse's "Steven's Untitled Rock Show" on May 29, 2006.

Impressed with the debut album's success, Interscope spent the next couple years grooming the band for a main label release. The resulting second full-length album, It's Hard to Move You, was ultimately set to be released on July 31, 2007. It was mostly recorded with producer Matt Squire (Panic! At the Disco); some tracks were recorded with Mark Hoppus of Blink-182. After years of writing/recording and numerous delays, It's Hard to Move You leaked online in its entirety on June 1, 2007. Soon after, Interscope closed its Kickball Records subsidiary, leaving talks of a main label move indefinitely in limbo and the album shelved ever since. ATFEH is currently trying to gain the rights to the record; a petition regarding the matter began circulating the Internet in 2015.

Mounting issues for the band took a toll on Harber (guitar, keys, vocals), who parted ways with the band in 2007. Mahurin (drums) also left the band in 2007 to join A Static Lullaby. The two were replaced by Casey Hill and Matt Thorsen, respectively.

With the band's label status in disrepair and the lineup drastically changed, ATFEH took some time to regroup, and reemerged with their second self-released EP, aptly titled Pick Up the Pieces, which was released on July 1, 2008.

In early 2009, Powell (bass) announced that he, too, would be leaving the band, and Ryan Warrell served as the bassist during the band's final months. Cruz (lead vocals), the last member to be added to the original lineup, was the only original member left at the band's end. On March 20, 2009, the band posted a blog on their MySpace saying that they are going on an indefinite hiatus. Hi-Fighter, a long-running side-project including Powell, Cruz, and Holt, also came to an end several months later.

Cruz and Powell went on to start the electro/pop/rock group "Come On, Come On!"

In 2013, marking the band's tenth birthday, frontman Kelvin Cruz made speculation of a band reunion including most of the original members. In April 2014, this came to fruition, as Holt, Harber, Powell, Cruz, and Nguyen came together to play a small festival in Southern California, the band's first show in over five years.

On June 17, 2016, A Thorn for Every Heart played a second reunion show with fellow resurrected band and long-time friends A Static Lullaby at the Roxy Theatre in West Hollywood. This incarnation featured Holt, Powell, Cruz, Nguyen, and Hill.

Original lineup member Joy Welling, violinist, died in March 2018 from a fall while rock climbing.

On December 14, 2018, the band came together for a third reunion at Emo Night Brooklyn's 2018 West Coast Holiday Fest at the Observatory in Santa Ana, California. The event featured DJ sets by Jordan Pundik of New Found Glory, Alex Varkatzas of Atreyu, and Nate Barcalow of Finch, as well as an acoustic set by Barcalow. A Thorn for Every Heart, consisting of Holt, Harber, Powell, Cruz, and Nguyen, provided the only full-band performance.

In 2019, Cruz and Powell started their second electronic duo, Nightmares and Neon, within the synthwave genre.

On December 14, 2019, A Thorn for Every Heart announced on their Facebook page that they would be recording "one last time" in January 2020. The announcement included a graphic showing the faces of (left to right) Powell, Nguyen, Holt, Cruz, Harber, and former drummer Matt Thorsen.

In December 2024, the band put out previously unreleased singles to streaming platforms in anticipation of their fourth reunion show in Santa Ana, CA, on February 8, 2025, along with Taken, The Juliana Theory, and A Static Lullaby. They plan to release some surprises along with another record in 2025.

== Legacy ==
In 2013, the staff of OC Weekly ranked A Thorn for Every Heart sixth on its list of the "Top 10 Worst Emo Bands Of All Time". They wrote: "The name of the band really speaks to what this band is, terrible melodramatic wussy boy music sold to pre-teen girls."

== Band members ==
- Jeff Harber – guitar, vocals
- Justin Powell – bass
- Kelvin Cruz – lead vocals
- Phil Nguyen – guitar
- James Forsberg – drums

== Discography ==
Title	Release date	Label
Silence Is Golden (EP)	2003	[self-released]
Things Aren't So Beautiful Now	2004	Kickball Records/Interscope Records
It's Hard to Move You †	2007	Kickball Records/Interscope Records
Pick Up the Pieces (EP)	2008	[self-released]

† never officially released

== Other works ==
ATFEH has been featured on compilations. Compilation tracks include:

- A cover of Oingo Boingo's "Dead Man's Party" on Punk Goes 80s
- A cover of "Jelly Belly" on The Killer in You: A Tribute to Smashing Pumpkins
- An acoustic version of their song "February" on Punk The Clock Volume 2
