= The Working Title =

American indie rock band

- Origin: Charleston, South Carolina, United States
- Genres: Rock, Indie
- Years active: 2001–2009
- Label: None
- Members: Joel Hamilton; Marcus Russell Price
- Past members: Adam Pavao; Chris Gingrich; Ross Taylor; Chris Ginn; Damian Joseph; Matt Podesla; Eric Sirianni; Adam Kirsch

The Working Title was an alternative pop/rock band formed in 2001 in Charleston, South Carolina. Their notable recordings include the independently produced EP Everyone Here Is Wrong (2003), as well as About Face (2006), their debut album with Universal imprint Cause for Alarm. Following the departure of other band members, singer/songwriter/multi-instrumentalist Joel Hamilton released the album Bone Island in 2009.

== History ==
They released their first E.P. Everyone Here Is Wrong in 2003. The EP was rated 5 out of 5 in Alternative Press Magazine, which also labeled The Working Title "A Band To Watch".

The band's next LP, About Face, was released July 18, 2006. On October 6, 2005, The Working Title began "The Music Is Much Too Loud Tour" with Circa Survive, Mae, and Mutemath as an opening act. The band has also been on tour with bands such as mewithoutYou, Copeland, Vedera, As Tall as Lions, Counting Crows, Our Lady Peace and the Goo Goo Dolls.

They have had their music featured on MTV's Laguna Beach and in the film American Wedding.

In 2003 Damian Joseph, the band's guitarist and a founding member, parted ways with the group. He can be heard on the band's self-produced Sincerely album (2002) and half of Everyone Here is Wrong (2003).

In late 2006 Chris Ginn, the band's bassist and a founding member, announced that he would be leaving the group to pursue a career in Structural Geology. The Working Title replaced him with Chris Gingrich.

May 9, 2009 saw the release of The Working Title's third album, Bone Island. Leading up to the creation of Bone Island, all of the members of the Working Title except for primary singer/songwriter Joel Hamilton left the band. In a review by AbsolutePunk, Bone Island was described as "a welcome, breath of fresh air".

Since the dissolution of the band, Hamilton has released an EP and an LP under his given name, an LP with Owen Beverly under the name Inlaws, an EP with Stephanie Underhill (who sings on Bone Island) under the name BABYLiPS, and most recently an LP under the name Mechanical River.

== Reception ==
In a review of About Face published on AllMusic, Corey Apar described the music as "essentially craft guitar-driven modern rock akin to a secular Switchfoot or a much less grandiose U2", with an approach that was "much more understated and comforting" with "an extremely light and welcoming aura".

The Post and Courier review of the independently produced Bone Island said, "losing the corporate suits just might be the best thing that ever happened to the band...Bone Island marks the musical maturing of a band already seasoned in the art of writing and performing". The review highlighted several songs, calling out "some amazing vocals from Hamilton on 'Followed'".

== Members ==
- Joel Hamilton – vocals, guitar, piano

== Former members ==
- Adam Pavao – guitar
- Chris Gingrich – bass
- Ross Taylor – drums
- Chris Ginn – bass
- Jason Maurer – bass
- Damian Joseph – guitar
- Matt Podesla – guitar
- Marcus Russell Price – bass
- Eric Sirianni – drums

== Discography ==
=== Albums ===
- Sincerely · 2002
- About-Face · 2006
- Bone Island · 2009

=== EPs ===
- Everyone Here Is Wrong · 2003
- Heart · 2008
- Bone Island Bonus EP · 2009
