= Brian McTernan =

American record producer

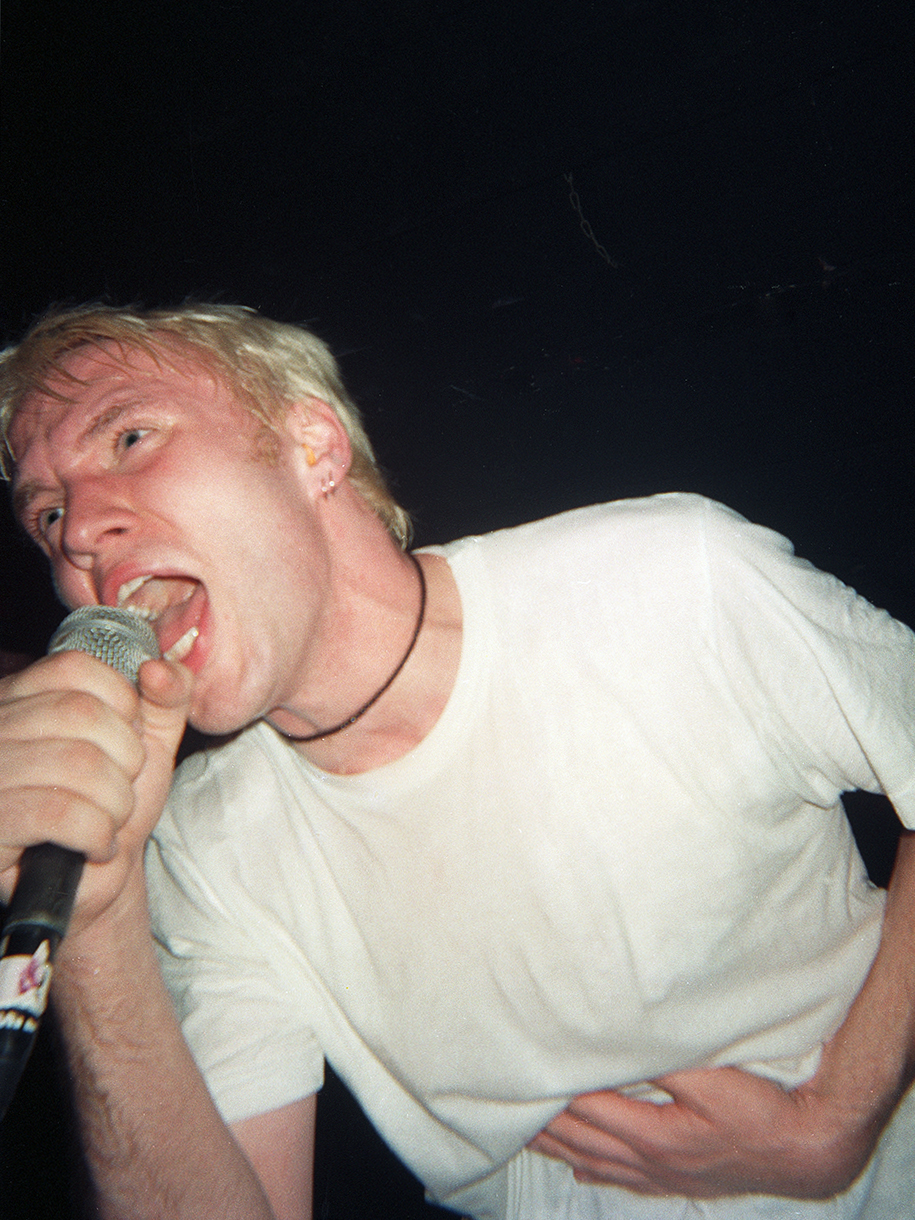
- McTernan performing with Battery in 1998

Background information
- Origin: Baltimore, Maryland, United States
- Genres: Hardcore punk; youth crew; straight edge
- Occupations: Musician, producer
- Instrument: guitar
- Years active: 1990–present

Brian McTernan is an American musician and record producer from Baltimore, Maryland. McTernan was the lead vocalist in the hardcore punk band Battery, the guitarist in Ashes, and is the singer in Be Well. In 2009, he was named one of "the 50 most influential people in Maryland" by the editors of The Daily Record.

McTernan operates the recording studio Salad Days from his home in Beltsville, Maryland. His studio is named after the Minor Threat song of the same name. In 2003, he formed Salad Days Records, a record label affiliated with Atlantic Records, through which he signed and released music by Moments in Grace.

== Early life ==
McTernan was born in Bethesda, Maryland. He had a troubled youth, which he addressed on Battery's 2017 song "My Last Breath". He dropped out of high-school at the age of 17 to tour with Battery.

== Musician ==
McTernan joined Ken Olden, Matt Squire, Toshi Yano and Zac Eller to form Battery in 1990. Originally called "Fury", the band released its first record in 1991 on Deadlock Records. In 2017, the band reunited releasing a compilation, For The Rejected By The Rejected, and toured Europe.

== Producer ==
In 1994, McTernan moved to Boston to be near his future wife who studied at Harvard University. He started his recording studio "Salad Days", when he was 18 years old, naming it after a song by Minor Threat from their 1985 Salad Days EP, in the basement of the house he shared with six roommates.
