= Hamacher =

Hamacher is a surname. Notable people with the surname include:

- Jason Hamacher, American musician
- Thomas Hamacher (born 1964), German physicist and professor
- Werner Hamacher (1948–2017), German literary critic

== See also ==
- Amacher
