= Jason Hamacher =

American musician and photographer

- Also known as: Ponan
- Origin: Satellite, Florida, United States
- Genres: Post-hardcore; Mathcore; Noisecore
- Occupation: Musician
- Instruments: Drums, Vocals
- Years active: 1993-present

Jason Hamacher is an American musician and photographer. He was the drummer for the band Frodus.

Aside from music, Hamacher is an accomplished photographer and documentarian and runs Lost Origin Productions LLC. He is currently working in Syria with the ancient Aramaic speaking Syriac Orthodox Church. In March 2008, Hamacher starred in the documentary short, Old Soul which won the 2008 International Documentary Challenge. Lost Origin Productions will release Hamacher's field recordings of the earliest known Christian chant, publish a book of his Syrian photography entitled Aleppo, Syria: Witness to an Ancient Legacy, and launch an international series of limited edition cross cultural images. In between 2006 and 2010, Hamacher recorded ancient Syria chants on his journeys.

In 2014, the Gallery at Convergence in Alexandria hosted an exhibit of his photographs, Syria: Sacred Spaces, Ancient Prayers. Hamacher has also worked with Smithsonian Folkways on a recording of Urfan chants recorded in Syria.

Hamacher has written about the state of Syria and his experiences documenting the communities there for "The Washington Post''.

Although he has remained quieter in the music scene than former bandmate Shelby Cinca, Hamacher has performed in Regents with Drew Ringo and David NeSmith formerly of Sleepytime Trio and Maximillian Colby, and former The Exploder bassist Dan Evans. Previously, Hamacher and Ringo had played as a keytar and drumo duo called Regions.

== Bands ==
Current

- Zealot R.I.P - drums (2006–present)
- Regents - drums (2007–present)

Former

- Frodus - drums (1993-1999, 2008-2010)
- Decahedron - drums (2003-2006)
- Mancake - vocals (1999)
- Battery - drums (1996-1998)
- Combatwoundedveteran - drums (2000-2003)

Touring

- Good Clean Fun - drums (2001)

== Discography ==
Frodus

Studio albums

- Molotov Cocktail Party (1994, Gnome / 2006, Carcrash Records iTunes)
- Fireflies (1995, Level / 2006 Carcrash Records iTunes)
- F-Letter (1996, Double Deuce / 2003, Magic Bullet Records)
- Conglomerate International (1998, Tooth and Nail / 2009 Lovitt Records)
- And We Washed Our Weapons in the Sea (2001, Fueled by Ramen)

Live Albums

- 22-D10 (live at WMUC Radio + Formula 7" Sessions) (1997, No Looking Back)
- Radio-Activity (live radio recordings at WMUC, WHFS, KXLU) (2002, Magic Bullet Records)
- Live at Black Cat 1999 iTunes-only (2005, Lovitt Records)
- Left for Dead in Halmstad! (live in Sweden, April 14, 1998) iTunes-only (2006, Carcrash Records)

Singles and EPs

- Babe (1993, Gnome)
- Tzo Boy (1993, Gnome)
- Treasure Chest (1994, Gnome / Level)
- Formula (1996, Lovitt / Shute)
- Split with Trans-Megetti (1996, Art Monk Construction)
- Explosions (1997, Day After Records)
- Split with Roadside Monument (1997, Tooth and Nail)
- Muddle Magazine Promo Flexi (1997, Tooth and Nail / Muddle)
- Split with Atomic Fireball (1999, Lovitt / Japan: Flatree Records)
- "Suspicion Breeds Confidence (Jason Vocals)" b/w "G. Gordon Liddy Show Call" (2006, Carcrash Records iTunes Only)
- Soundlab 1 (2010, Lovitt Records)

Mancake

- We Will Destroy You (1999, Art Monk Construction)

Regents

- Regents (2011, Lovitt Records)
- Antietam After Party (2012, Lovitt Records)

Battery

- Whatever It Takes (1998, Revelation Records)

Decahedron

- Disconnection_Imminent (2004, Lovitt Records)
- 2005 (2005, Lovitt Records)

Combatwoundedveteran

- Electric Youth Crew (2002, Schematics Records; Split w/ Reversal of Man)
- Duck Down For The Torso (2002, No Idea Records)
