= Amaker =

Amaker is a surname. Notable people with the surname include:

- Brent Amaker, American singer
- Marcus Amaker (born 1976), American poet
- Tommy Amaker (born 1965), American basketball player and coach
- Braheem Amaker - Sutton (born 2006), American

== See also ==
- Amacher
