= This Is Medicine =

Studio album by Reversal Of Man
- Released: August 9, 1999
- Studios: Morrisound Recording (Temple Terrace, Florida); The House Of Doom
- Genres: Hardcore punk, Screamo, emoviolence
- Length: 20:01
- Label: Ebullition
- Producer: Steve Heritage

Reversal Of Man chronology
Revolution Summer (1998)	This Is Medicine (1999)	Discography (2001)

Professional ratings
Review scores
Source	Rating
Allmusic	3/5 stars
Collective Zine	(generally favorable)

This Is Medicine is the only studio album by American hardcore band Reversal Of Man, released on August 9, 1999 through Ebullition Records. Jeremy Bolm of Touché Amoré named the album as one of his favorites.

== Background ==
Reversal Of Man first formed in 1995 in Tampa, Florida and spent most of their time as a band touring and releasing music before breaking up in 2000. In July 1996, their split 12" vinyl with Canadian band Holocron was released through Intention Records, which caught the attention of Ebullition Records owner Kent McClard, who eventually agreed to release This Is Medicine (after plans fell through to release the album through Intention Records). To support the album, the band toured across Europe during the spring of 1999, and they subsequently toured the United States during the summer of that same year with Combatwoundedveteran.

The album was recorded at Morrisound Recording and at The House Of Doom, with production and recording duties being done by Steve Heritage of Assück.

== Track listing ==
No.	Title	Length
1.	"January Twenty Second"	1:22
2.	"Enoch Ardon"	0:56
3.	"Fashion Cowboys"	0:22
4.	"The Hougon"	1:16
5.	"Butterflies"	1:28
6.	"Mittins And Muzzles"	1:59
7.	"Bless The Printing Press"	1:43
8.	"The Lottery"	1:33
9.	"Dying On Cue"	0:42
10.	"Conjecture"	0:51
11.	"Hills Have Eyes"	1:40
12.	"Transfer Zounds"	0:37
13.	"Hand Me Complaints Please"	1:36
14.	"Rubberneck Telepathy"	1:08
15.	"Idle Adolescents"	1:01
16.	"Twenty Second Example Of Repetitive Nature"	0:27
Total length:		20:01

== Personnel ==
- Matt Coplon – vocals
- Dan Radde – guitar, vocals
- Chris Norris – guitar
- Jeff Howe – bass, vocals
- John Willey – drums
- Steve Heritage – production, recording
