= And We Washed Our Weapons in the Sea =

Studio album by Frodus
- Released: February 21, 2001
- Recorded: August – October, 1999 at Salad Days Studios, Washington DC
- Genre: Post-hardcore; art rock; math rock
- Length: 45:58
- Label: Fueled by Ramen
- Producer: Brian McTernan

Frodus chronology
Conglomerate International (1998)	And We Washed Our Weapons in the Sea (2001)	Radio-Activity (2002)

Professional ratings
Review scores
Source	Rating
Allmusic	4.5/5 stars

And We Washed Our Weapons in the Sea is the fifth and final studio album by American post-hardcore band Frodus, which was released posthumously in 2001. The album received very positive feedback from critics and fans alike, and is considered as the band's best effort.

== Background ==
The album was completed in 1999, and was recorded in a few months at Salad Days Studio. In the studio, bassist Nathan Burke played a G&L bass through an Ampeg amp, while frontman Shelby Cinca played Fender Jazzmaster and Epiphone Coronet guitars and primarily employed Marshall JCM800 and Vox AC30 amps. The album saw Cinca employ more traditional melodic singing in addition to his usual screamed vocals, partly because the band was "a little tired from screaming all the time," and partly because singing suited the songs better.

According to Cinca, "The Awesome Machine" deals with "the progress of humanity and technology," though Frodus adopted lyrics such as "The machines never died" as their motto, signifying that their music may live on long after the end of the band. The band began writing the instrumental "Belgian Congo" while on a tour of Sweden with Refused.

The band disbanded around that time and decided to make the record their last. However, due to struggles finding a proper label to release the record, its release-date was held back. During 2000, tracks from the album would leak onto file-sharing networks, such as Napster. The disc was intended to be released through MIA-Records, but the label shut down due to lawsuits the owner was dealing with at the time. It was not until Tony Weinbender, a long-time-friend of the band, signed them to Fueled by Ramen, that helped them release the record in early 2001.

The album is dedicated to Alanna Alindogan.

== Track listing ==
All tracks are written by Frodus.

No.	Title	Length
1.	"Red Bull of Juarez"	2:18
2.	"The Earth Isn't Humming"	4:40
3.	"There Will Be No More Scum"	4:46
4.	"Out-circuit the Ending"	5:48
5.	"Chiriacho Summit"	1:54
6.	"Belgian Congo"	5:55
7.	"The Awesome Machine"	4:20
8.	"6/99"	4:43
9.	"Hull Crush Depth"	3:34
10.	"Year of the Hex"	4:57
11.	"And We Washed Our Weapons in the Sea"	3:05

== Personnel ==
=== Performers ===
- Shelby Cinca - Vocals, guitar, electronics
- Jason Hamacher - Drums, percussion
- Nathan Burke - Bass, vocals, keyboards

=== Production ===
- Prof. Yaya - Layout
- Nathan Burke - Photography
- Shigeo Kikuchi - Photography
- Anthony Childs - Photography
- Brian McTernan - Production
