= Trucido =

Trucido is an American grindcore band from Dallas, Texas. Decibel stated that "every song [by the band] is a chromatic roller coaster to Hell, collapsing in on itself as it rampages through your earholes." Invisible Oranges said the band's sound "largely eschews technicality for sheer brutality." Their debut album is called A Collection of Self Destruction, released in 2022. Their second album is called Epiphanic Delusions of a Spiritual Warfare, released in 2026. Drummer Bryan Fajardo also performs in Cognizant and Flesh Parade, according to Dallas Observer.
