= Good Clean Fun (band) =

American hardcore punk band

- Origin: Washington, D.C., United States
- Genres: Hardcore punk; melodic hardcore
- Years active: 1997–present
- Labels: Reflections Records; Equal Vision Records

Good Clean Fun is a hardcore punk band from Washington, D.C. who took their band name from the Descendents song of the same name. The band gained a particular internet following after they released "The MySpace Song", a spoof ballad about a girl who leaves her boyfriend for a person she met on Myspace.

== History ==
Formed in 1997, the band used self-irony when spreading their message of veganism, straight edge, feminism and optimism. Their main influence is New York straight edge group Gorilla Biscuits. Other influences include 7 Seconds, Minor Threat, and Youth of Today.

The band recorded three records before pretending to part ways in 2002, saying "their mission had been accomplished and they had reached their goals." At the same time, also as predicted in their song "I Can't Wait", they released a compilation album from their entire career, Positively Positive 1997–2002, on Equal Vision. The band continued the running gag, doing a 'reunion' tour in 2004. GCF released a new record in January 2006 entitled Between Christian Rock And A Hard Place again on Equal Vision. In Europe their material is released by Reflections Records. The new album was supported by a full European and US tours. This included their third performance at Fluff Fest in the Czech Republic for which they received €300. In December 2006 the band announced they would be releasing a rarities compilation entitled Crouching Tiger, Moshing Panda and would include compilation tracks, out of print 7"'s, and some songs that are not available on any albums.

In late summer of 2009 the band completed a full-length feature film titled Good Clean Fun: The Movie, based on a script written by Diao. Shooting began in November 2007.

== Touring ==
In 2000, Good Clean Fun played a world tour, including dates in more than 30 countries in North America, South America, Europe, and Australia/NZ.

The band also toured in Iceland (2004), Israel (2001), Mexico (2005), and Russia (2010)

== Band members ==
Good Clean Fun is known for its ever-changing line up. Current, past, and touring members include:

- Mr. Issa
- Aaron Mason
- Alex G.ª Rivera
- John Robinson (of Fighting Dogs and RAMBO)
- Justin DuClos (of The Lapse and The Holy Childhood, derivations of Native Nod)
- Anita Storm van Leeuwan
- Ryan Smith
- Eddie Smith
- Danny McClure
- Mike Mowery
- Justin Ingstrup
- Austin Hedges
- Kelly Green
- Mike Phyte
- John Delve
- Casey Watson (of Yaphet Kotto and Look Back and Laugh)
- Andrew Black (of The Explosion and Georgie James)
- John Committed
- Jeff Grant (of Stop It! and Pink Razors)
- Scott Andrews (of The Scare)
- Rapha (of Undressed Army)
- Pete D.C.
- Seth Friedlander
- Thom Lambert (formerly of Unteachers)
- Javier Casas (of Nueva Ética and Sudarshana)
- Sean Petteway
- Jason Hamacher (formerly of Frodus)

== Discography ==
- Shopping for a Crew 7" – 1997 on Underestimated/Reflections
- Who Shares Wins 7" – 1998 on Phyte
- Shopping for a Crew CD – 1999 on Phyte/Dead Serious
- Let's Go Crazy 7" Picture Disk – 2000 on Phyte
- On the Streets Saving the Scene from the Forces of Evil – 2000 on Phyte/Reflections
- Live In Springfield 12" LP – 2000 on Phyte
- Shawn King can Suck It 10" LP – 2001 on Phyte
- Straight Outta Hardcore – 2001 on Phyte/Reflections/Defiance
- Good Clean Fun/Throwdown X-mas Split 7" -2001 on Prime Directive
- Positively Positive 1997-2002 – 2002 on Equal Vision (compilation album)
- Today the Scene, Tomorrow the World Live CD – 2004
- Thumbs Up! 7" – 2006 on Cat 'n' Cakey Records (split with Dead After School)
- Between Christian Rock and a Hard Place – 2006 on Equal Vision
- Crouching Tiger, Moshing PandaCD – 2007 Self Released
- Today The Scene, Tomorrow The World Live Enhanced CD – 2007 Self Released
- V/A-Fight The World Not Each Other comp. – 1999 on Reflections Records
- V/A-The Rebirth Of Hardcore: 1999 comp. – 1999 on SuperSoul Records
- V/A-For The Kids Together comp. – 2000 on Together Records
