= Jonathan Kreinik =

American record producer

Jonathan Kreinik is an American record producer, who has produced numerous records from his Boombox Magnetica Studio(s), as well as in different studio locations around the globe. He has worked with the bands !!!, Trans Am, The Make-Up, and Frodus, among others. On occasion he is a traveling live-sound engineer for such bands as The Rapture, Elefant, Le Tigre, and Rocket From The Crypt.

Kreinik is originally from Washington, D.C.

== Discography ==
- AKA JK "Someone Out There..." EP written, recorded and mixed by JK, performed and produced by JK and Vito Roccoforte, Throne Of Blood
- Jonathan Kreinik "Drone Tape" Single written, performed and recorded, on Swedish Columbia
- Jonathan Kreinik Return To Precinct 13 EP written, performed, programmed and produced Boombox Magnetica on Swedish Columbia
- Las Palabras mixed 2 songs for 7" at Boombox Magnetica, on Fox Hollow Recordings
- Jonathan Kreinik (JNTHN) "Darklight" EP written, performed, programmed and produced Boombox Magnetica on Swedish Columbia
- Make Up recorded and mixed bonus material for "In Film/On Video DVD. Recorded BMBX/Mixed Upstairs, on Dischord
- Wizardry - "s/t", 2009
- The MFA - Remix, Border Community, 2009
- Extra Golden - Mixed "Thank You Very Quickly" on Thrill Jockey, 2009
- The Cassettes - Recorded and Mixed "Countach", 2008
- Extra Golden - Mixed "Hera Ma Nono" Full Length on Thrill Jockey, 2007
- Supersystem - Recorded and mixed "A Million Microphones" full-length on Touch & Go, 2006
- The Cassettes - 'Neath the Pale Moon / Boombox Magnetica Mobile @ Upstairs Studio, 2005
- Le Tigre - Live recordings all around the world / Boombox Magnetica Mobile
- El Vez - Live recording for upcomping comp @ Boombox Magnetica Mobile
- The Cassettes - Recorded and mixed song for compilation on Desoto Records @ Upstairs, Boombox Magnetica Mobile
- Hot Snakes - Recorded some vocals, organ (played/recorded) and guitar for the track "Audit In Progress" on Swami records @ Drag Racist
- Out Hud - Recorded and sound designed drums/synths @ National Recording Studio, DC (NRS)
- The Apes - Recorded Baba's Mountain for Birdman Recordings @ NRS
- Certainly, Sir - Songs for LP on Rallye @ NRS
- Supersystem - Mixed/processed 2 songs for 12"/Full Length on Touch and Go @ NRS
- Measles Mumps Rubella - Recorded and Mixed Fantastic Success LP @ NRS, Boombox Magnetica, Popcorn, Revitte's
- !!! - Single Mix for "Pardon My Freedom" and some tracking for LP on Warp/Touch and Go @ NRS
- Measles Mumps Rubella - Recorded and mixed Fountain of Youth 12" on Troubleman @ NRS
- Black Taj - Recorded for full-length on Amish Records @ NRS
- Aim of Conrad - 5 songs for EP on Iodine @ NRS
- The Oranges Band - Recorded "My Street" for LP on Lookout!! @ NRS
- Mount Simms - Remix w/Memoryboy, "How We Do" @ Boombox Magnetica w/ John Selway on Emperor Norton under the name Memoryboy vs. Limousine Unlimited
- !!! - "Me And Giuliani" 12" for Warp/Touch and Go 12" @ NRS and Boombox Magnetica
- The American - 11 song CD @ NRS
- 302 Acid - Tracked @ NRS
- Aim Of Conrad - 4 songs recording @ NRS
- Early Humans - 4 song recording @ NRS
- Scientology - 7 song 8-track Boombox Mobile recording, mixed at Pirate House
- Trans Am - "TA" for Thrill Jockey @ NRS
- TanLine - Boombox Macintoshica 1999-2000 CD
- Hot Cross - Produced 24 track recording at Recording Arts w/Nikhil Ranade
- EBSK - Boombox Macintoshica recording for Mobstar Records
- Maestro Echoplex - 16 track recording @ NRS
- Calibos - A portion of the 16 track recording and mixing for Handhled Records
- Pines of Nowhere - 7" 16 track NRS/ Boombox Pro Tools recording for Level Plane w/Nikhil Ranade
- Trans Am - A portion of the album "Red Line", 16 track NRS recording
- Pines of Nowhere - 16 track s/t on Slowdime w/Nikhil Ranade @ NRS recording
- Calibos - 16 track NRS rec. for Arlingtone Records
- The Movies - 16 track recording @ NRS for BCORE Spain/Gern Blandsten Records
- Calibos - 8 track recording @ Boombox
- Frodus - "Disco" split single w/Atomic Fireball 8-track NRS recording for Lovitt Records
- Trans Am - Futureworld 24 track LP for thrill jockey @ WGNS
- Nate Burke - solo 8 track demos featuring Nathan from Out_Circuit and Ludde from INC @ Boombox Magnetica
- The Impossible 5 - 8 track recording unreleased, Boombox Magnetica
- The Make-Up - Re-recorded vocals for "I Want Some" from a beach zombie movie @ Boombox Magnetica
- The Make-Up - 8-track "Little Black Book" 7" for K @ Boombox Magnetica
- Low Numbers - 24 track, 3 song demo @ WGNS
- EngineDown - 6 songs for Lovitt Records, 2 released as "Castalia" 7"/8 track
- Knodel - 16 songs with Phil Manley/8 track on Spongebath* @ the Bridge
- Frodus Conglomerate International - Produced, Engineered by Bruce Kane. 13 song, 24trk, Album for Tooth and Nail Records @ Sterling Productions in Sterling, Virginia
- Treiops Treyfid Experience - 1 song, 8trk, for web release* @ Boombox Mobile
- Trans Am - Futureworld demos / live to 2 track
- Les Trois Malheures 8 or 9 songs, done and redone/8 track*
- The Impossible 5 "Rally Race" single for Lovitt Records/8 track*
- Frodus - 2 songs for Day After Records (Czech Republic)/8 track
- Frodus - 2 songs for split with Roadside Monument/Tooth and Nail/16 track @ WGNS
- Frodus - 2 songs for a flexi, Tooth & Nail+Muddle Fanzine/ 8 track
- The Travellers of Tyme - Song for Sub Culture Sucks Back comp, one for The Shadows tribute CD/LP (MuSick Recordings)/8 track
- The Jerks - Song for Sub Culture Sucks Back comp/8 track*
- Spore - Live to 2 track *
- Run for Tin
- Karate side project, 3 song demo/24 track
- Juniper - A few singles worth, for Orange, Turntable Friend and Fantastic/8 track*
- Guided By Voices - Mixes w/G.Turner for "GvsB vs. GBV," Radiopaque/16 track
- Victory At Sea - 16 track demo 1996
- Pork Trimmer - 6 song tape 1993
- Les Trois Malheures - 6 song tape 1997
- Rosa Chancewell - 2 song Samuel side project for Art Monk Construction Records 1996
- Sick Sick Six - 8 track 1996
- Swordplay - 24 track 1995
- Ambush at Junction Rock - 24 track* 1995
