= Reversal of Man =

American hardcore punk band

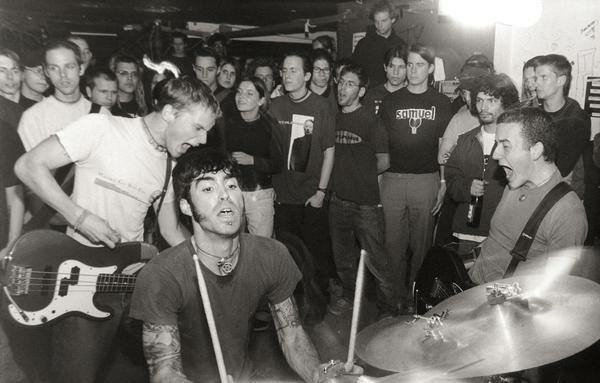
- Reversal of Man performing in Vienna, Austria c. 1999

Background information
- Origin: Tampa, Florida, U.S.
- Genres: Hardcore punk; screamo; powerviolence; grindcore
- Years active: 1995–2000; 2025–present
- Labels: Ebullition; Schematics; Independence Day; Intention
- Past members: Matt Coplon; Dan Radde; Chris Norris; Jeff Howe; John Willey; Jeremy Gewertz; Jason Crittenden; Jasen Weitekamp; Chris Hitchcock; Joe Camacho; Jason Rubacky
- Website: archivistrecords.bandcamp.com

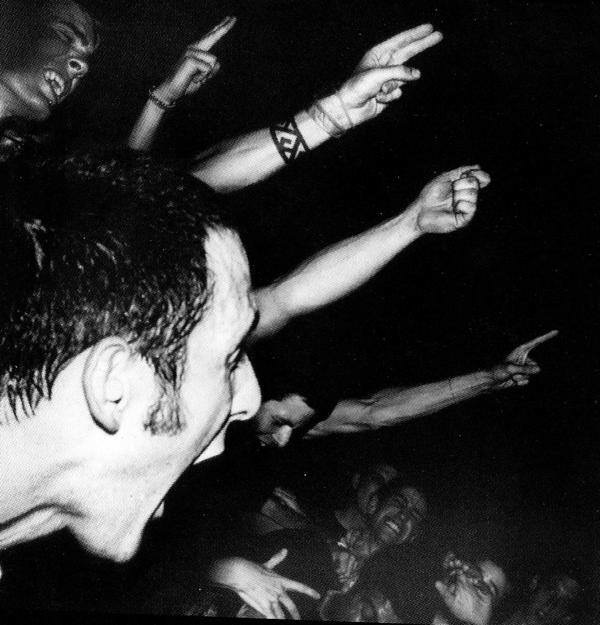
Gainesville Fest 1997

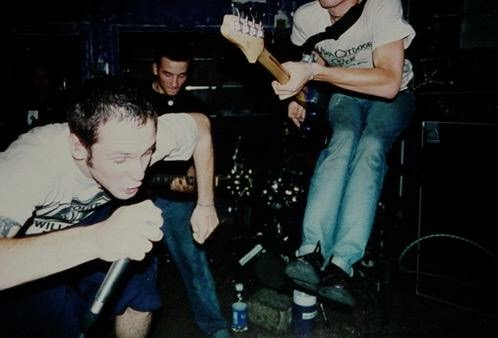
PCH Club 1998

Reversal of Man is an American hardcore punk band from Tampa, Florida, formed in 1995. The band is associated with the late 1990s screamo movement and noted for bordering on powerviolence and grindcore. Their lyrical content was often political, and the group initially formed as a reaction to the then-growing underground nazi punk scene in Florida.

During their existence, the band toured frequently across the United States as well as parts of Europe. Vocalist Matt Coplon was known for taping his microphone to his hand in order to not lose it during spastic performances. The band were signed onto Ebullition Records for the release of their sole full-length album, This Is Medicine, in 1999 after label operator Kent McClard found out about them through their demo, which was positively reviewed in HeartattaCk Fanzine Volume 6. Jeremy Bolm of Touché Amoré has cited This Is Medicine as one of his favorite albums.

The group would eventually break up in 2000, with members going on to play in bands such as CombatWoundedVeteran, Fathers, Horsewhip, Guiltmaker and Light Yourself on Fire.

== Members ==
Final line-up

- Matt Coplon – vocals (1995–2000)
- Chris Norris – guitar (1999–2000)
- Jeff Howe – bass, vocals (1996–2000)
- Dan Radde – guitar, vocals (1998–2000)
- John Willey – drums (1995–2000)

Past members

- Jason Crittenden – guitar (1997–1999)
- Jasen Weitekamp – guitar (1996–1998)
- Joe Camacho – guitar (1995–1996)
- Jason Rubacky – bass (1995–1996)
- Chris Hitchcock – guitar (1995–1996)

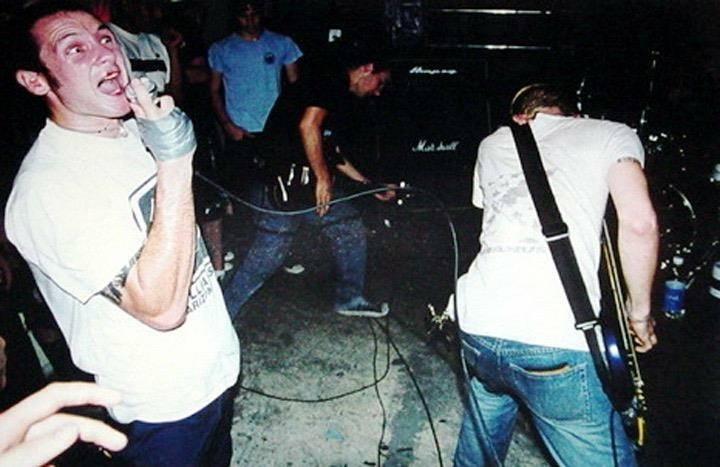
PCH Club 1998

Touring musicians

- Jeremy Gewertz – drums

Timeline

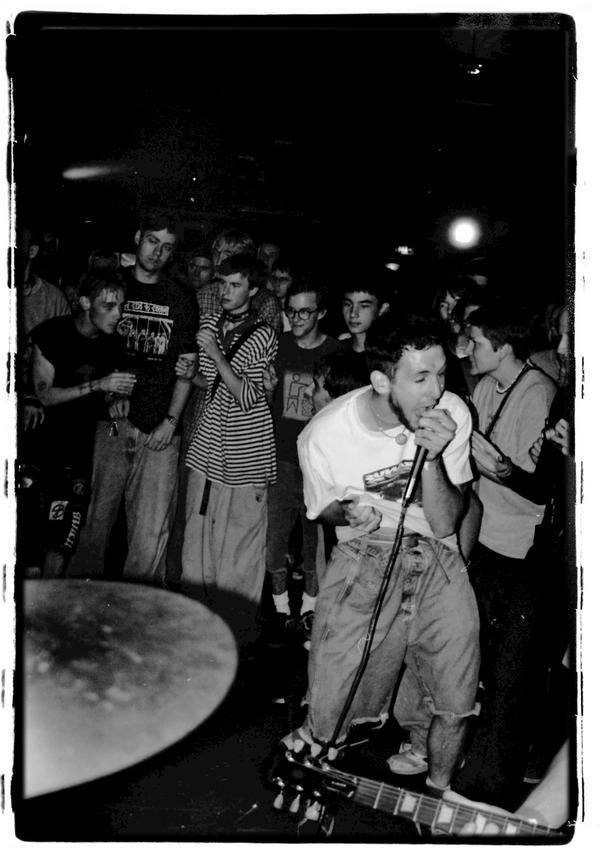
Indianapolis Fest 1996

== Discography ==
=== Studio albums ===
- This Is Medicine (1999, Ebullition)

=== EPs ===
- Reversal of Man (1996, Valrico)
- Revolution Summer (1998, Independence Day)

=== Demos ===
- Reversal of Man (1995, Self-released)

=== Split albums ===
- Reversal of Man / Cease (1995, Blacksmith/Plead)
- Reversal of Man / Puritan (1995, King Of The Monsters)
- Reversal of Man / Holocron (1996, Intention)
- Reversal of Man / Enemy Soil (1998, Fist Held High)
- Reversal of Man / Los Crudos (2001, Ebullition)
- Electric Youth Crew - split w/ CombatWoundedVeteran (2002, Schematics)

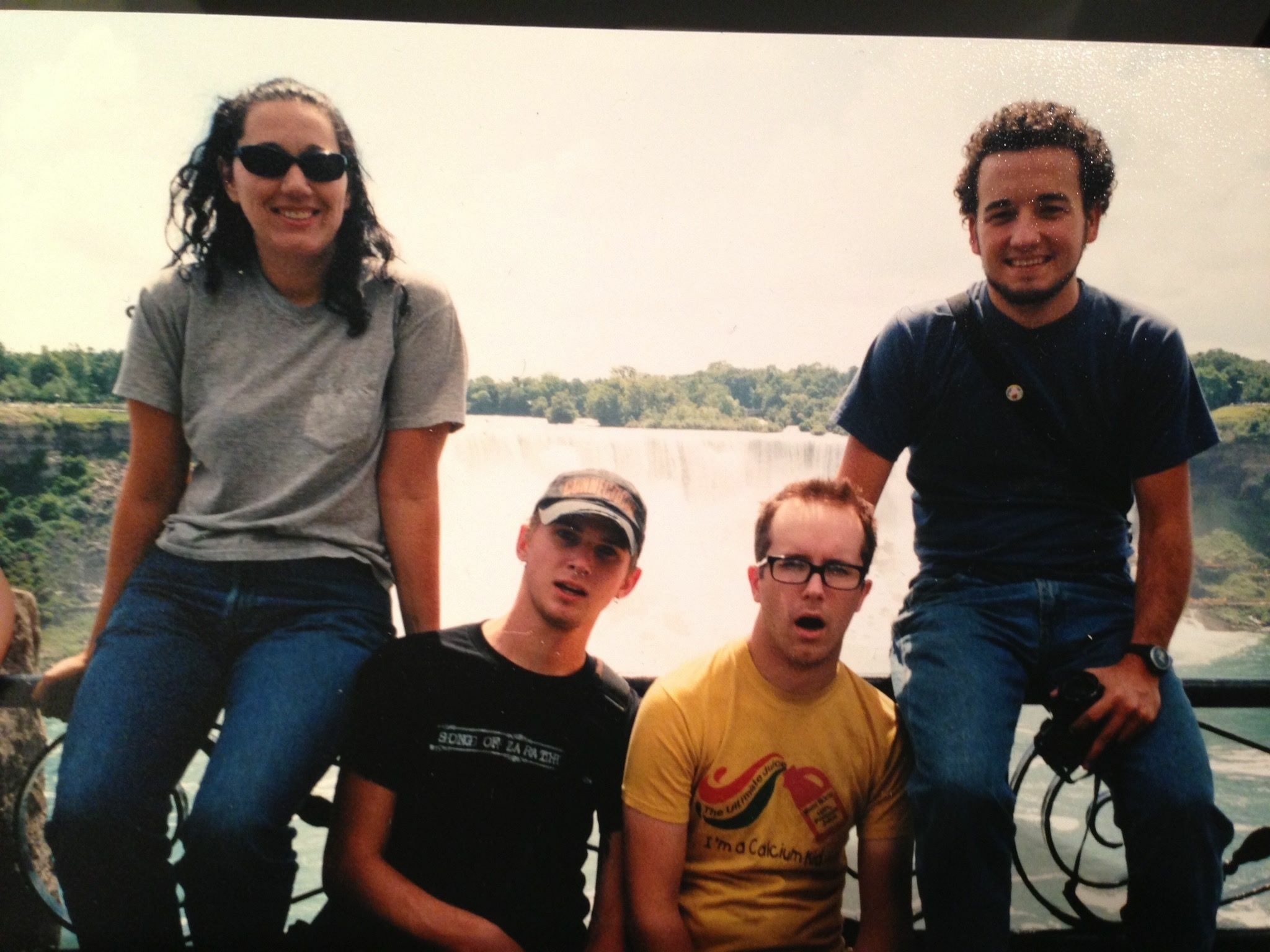
Niagara Falls 1999 - Nice, Jeff, Chris and Dan

=== Compilation albums ===
- Discography (2001, Schematics)

=== Compilation appearances ===
- Placebo (1995, Concurrent) - "Assembly"
- Follow N' Believe: A Food Not Bombs Benefit Compilation (1996, Element) - "A Child's Dream"
- Israfel (1997, Ape) - "Untitled"
- The Caligula Effect (1997, Catechism) - "Silver Pieces Of Eight"
- Between A Rock And A Hard Place (1998, Witching Hour) - "I'm A New York City Detective That Strays From Cheap Suits And Short Sleeve Shirts And Ties"
- The Great Enlightenment? (1998, A-Team/Hit The Ground Running) - "Theory Of La Masastra"
- 403 Comp (Florida Fucking Hardcore) (1998, Schematics) - "These Hills Have Eyes"
- The Brave Do Not Fear The Grave (1999, Alveran/Grave Romance) - "Mercy"
- Back To Donut! (1999, No Idea) - "The Set Up"
- Che Fest 1999 (1999, Slowdance) - "Quantis"
- Can't Stop This Train (1999, Join The Team Player) - "These Hills Have Eyes"
