= Between Christian Rock and a Hard Place =

Studio album by Good Clean Fun
- Released: January 24, 2006
- Genre: Hardcore punk
- Length: 28:42
- Label: Equal Vision

Good Clean Fun chronology
Today the Scene, Tomorrow the World (2004)	Between Christian Rock and a Hard Place (2006)	Crouching Tiger, Moshing Panda (2007)

Professional ratings
Review scores
Source	Rating
PunkNews	4/5 stars

Between Christian Rock and a Hard Place is the fourth studio album released by Washington, D.C. hardcore punk band Good Clean Fun. It was released in 2006 on Equal Vision Records.

== Track list ==
No.	Title	Length
1.	"A Little Bit of Emo, A Little Bit of Hardcore"	2:39
2.	"Positive Hardcore"	1:53
3.	"Between Christian Rock and a Hard Place"	1:54
4.	"Drop the Knife"	1:56
5.	"Punk Rock Love"	1:42
6.	"Drug War"	1:45
7.	"Ex-Straightedge-Ex"	1:02
8.	"It's Fun to be a Vampire..."	1:56
9.	"...Except for All the Goths"	1:41
10.	"A Healthy Dose of Reality Television"	2:16
11.	"What Corporate Rock Can't Say"	2:32
12.	"The Myspace Song"	7:22
13.	"[untitled track]"	0:04

== Personnel ==
- Mr. Issa – vocals
- Aaron Mason – guitar
- Kelly Green – guitar
- Justin Ingstrup – bass guitar
- Danny McClure – drums
