= Anson Street African Burial Ground =

18th-century cemetery in South Carolina

Coordinates: 32.7863°N 79.9315°W

Anson Street African Burial Ground is a historic African American cemetery and archeological site in Charleston, South Carolina, United States. Children, women and men of African descent were buried at this location between the 1760s and 1790s. The graves were uncovered during the 2013 excavation of a trench for the construction of the Gaillard Center.

== History ==
Anson Street African Burial Ground was rediscovered historic cemetery where thirty-six people of African descent were buried in 18th-century Charleston, South Carolina. The burial ground was in use from approximately 1760 to 1790.

Archaeological investigations conducted by Dr. Eric Poplin, with Brockington and Associates, LLC. indicated that the bodies had been buried in four closely aligned rows, oriented east to west, all lying near the corner of Anson Street and George Street. Grave goods included two British copper halfpenny coins, one of which was found in the eye socket of one child, later named Welela. The coin dated to 1773. The ancestors were given honorary names that reflected their African and Gullah Geechee ancestries, on April 27, 2019. . The remains of a wooden coffin and buttons from what was possibly a boy's coat were also unearthed.

On December 14, a memorial "fountain ringed with bronze hands, all modeled from Black residents of similar ages to the 36 people found" was dedicated. The memorial fountain was designed by Stephen L. Hayes, Jr..

Efforts to identify the origins of the buried people include DNA research, to identify genetic background, as well as isotope mapping, to pinpoint geographic locations for the birthplaces of persons from this and some other sites, as part of an ambitious project to get more insight into the trans-Atlantic slave trade.
