= Fireflies (Frodus album) =

Studio album by Frodus
- Released: May 5, 1995
- Recorded: at Inner Ear Studios & SNP
- Genre: Post-hardcore
- Label: Level Records, Carcrash Records

Frodus chronology
| Molotov Cocktail Party (1994) | Fireflies (1995) | F-Letter (1996) |

Fireflies is the second studio album by American post-hardcore band Frodus, released in 1995 through Level Records. The album was initially going to be a glow-in-the-dark 7" single until the band decided to instead release a full-length album because it was "just as cheap". The album was initially released on CD format, limited to 1100 copies. The album was reissued digitally in 2006, remastered and with new artwork and an alternative track-listing. The band's bandcamp page also hosts another reissue of the record, also including unique cover-art and track-listing.

== Track listing ==
Original 1995 Release
| No. | Title | Length |
|---|---|---|
| 1. | "Rocketry Is My Plan" | 3:26 |
| 2. | "Fireflies" | 5:06 |
| 3. | "Yoncopin" | 4:20 |
| 4. | "Computers (Love)" | 1:27 |
| 5. | "Something Must Break" | 4:57 |
| 6. | "Malcontent" | 2:17 |
| 7. | "Honest Praise The Great Motivator" | 3:24 |
| 8. | "Creedo" | 1:28 |
| 9. | "Purvis Dawson In "The Sucatash Room"" | 17:48 |
| Total length: | | 44:13 |

2006 Reissue
| No. | Title | Length |
|---|---|---|
| 1. | "Rocketry Is My Plan" | 3:26 |
| 2. | "Fireflies" | 5:06 |
| 3. | "Yoncopin" | 4:20 |
| 4. | "Malcontent" | 2:17 |
| 5. | "Honest Praise The Great Motivator" | 3:24 |
| 6. | "Something Must (Break)" | 4:58 |
| 7. | "Purvis Dawson" | 2:27 |
| 8. | "Yanni" | 0:42 |
| 9. | "Malcontent (Alternative Mix)" | 2:15 |
| Total length: | | 28:55 |

2010 Reissue
| No. | Title | Length |
|---|---|---|
| 1. | "Honest Praise The Great Motivator" | 3:24 |
| 2. | "Yoncopin" | 4:20 |
| 3. | "Fireflies" | 5:06 |
| 4. | "Rocketry Is My Plan" | 3:14 |
| 5. | "Malcontent" | 2:15 |
| 6. | "Something Must (Break)" | 4:58 |
| 7. | "Purvis Dawson" | 2:27 |
| 8. | "Yanni" | 0:40 |
| 9. | "Malcontent (Alternative Mix)" | 2:15 |
| Total length: | | 28:39 |

== Personnel ==
- Shelby Cinca - Vocals, guitar
- Jason Hamacher - Drums, backing vocals
- Andy Duncan - Bass
- Jim Cooper - Bass
- Don Zientara - Engineering
- Mike Davis - Engineering
- Ken Olden - Engineering
