= Molotov Cocktail Party =

Studio album by Frodus
- Released: 1994
- Recorded: December 1993 – January 1994 at Inner Ear Studios, Arlington, VA
- Genre: Post-hardcore
- Length: 19:51
- Label: Gnome Records
- Producer: Don Zientara, Frodus

Frodus chronology
Molotov Cocktail Party (1994)	Fireflies (1995)

Molotov Cocktail Party is the debut studio album by post-hardcore band Frodus, released in 1994 through Gnome Records, initially released exclusively on cassette format, limited to 1,000 blue copies. The album was reissued on digital formats in 2006.

== Track listing ==
All tracks are written by Frodus.

Side One
No.	Title	Length
1.	"Sasquatch"	3:15
2.	"Bousel Room"	1:52
3.	"Space Monkey"	3:26
4.	"Business Creep"	2:26

Side Two
No.	Title	Length
5.	"Aliens Think You're Special"	2:06
6.	"Pencil"	3:17
7.	"Yoyodyne"	1:16
8.	"Buckaroo Bonzai"	2:13

2006 Reissue Bonus Track
No.	Title	Length
9.	"Dokken"	1:13
Total length:		21:04

== Personnel ==
- Shelby Cinca - Vocals, guitar, artwork
- Jason Hamacher - Drums
- Jim Cooper - Bass, Vocals
- Charles Bennington - Saxophone
- Steve Kille - Artwork
- Don Zientara - Production, recording, mixing
- Frodus - Music, mixing
