= Cognizant (band) =

Cognizant is an American grindcore band. The band's drummer Bryan Fajardo also plays in the bands Gridlink, Phobia and Kill The Client.

== History ==
The band participated in the Global Grindcore Alliance during the COVID-19 pandemic in December 2020.

== Musical style ==
Decibel described them as a "technical grindcore band". The site also said the band's guitar work incorporates "sci-fi riffs/chords". Invisible Oranges compared the band's sound to Canadian death metal band Gorguts and American technical death metal band Pyrrhon. On their split EP with Cryptic Void, they incorporated elements of space music.

== Reception ==
Decibel said the band's 2021 split with Cryptic Void "features one of the most memorable melodies to come out of grindcore th[at] year." Invisible Oranges referred to the band's second album Inexorable Nature of Adversity as "a convoluted head-spinner that’s as thrilling as it is disorientating." The site said the album represented the best of what the genre had to offer from the second half of 2023.
