= Bryan Fajardo =

Bryan Fajardo is an American extreme metal drummer based in Dallas. He performs with grindcore bands Gridlink, Cognizant, Trucido, as well as Flesh Parade according to Dallas Observer. The same publication stated the opinion that he was among the greater grindcore drummers: "In a genre categorized by its reliance on a rigid, rapid-fire drumbeat called a blastbeat, Fajardo has managed to be one of only a handful of drummers to put his stamp on the genre, infusing fluidity and grace into the jackhammer-like rhythms."

Fajardo has also played in bands Baren Path, Triage, Takafumi Matsubara, Fermented Mess, as well as Sulfuric Cauterty. Additionally, he had played in bands Noisear and Kill the Client. Known for his speed and innovative drum patterns and fills, Metal Injection referred to him as "insane".

== Musical career ==
=== Flesh Parade ===
Flesh Parade is an American grindcore band from New Orleans, formed in 1992. They released two demos. They signed to Relapse Records in 1998, through which they released the album Kill Whitey. In 2017, they played a benefit concert to help fellow New Orleans musician Mike IX Williams of Eyehategod raise money to pay for his medical bills following a liver transplant. They were scheduled to play Maryland Deathfest in 2020, according to BrooklynVegan. Flesh Parade released a video for their song "Repurcussions" on May 27, 2025. Their debut album was also remastered and rereleased in 2026. It was announced that the band's bassist Jorge Caicedo died at age 54 on January 19, 2026. His cause of death was not stated. He had previously performed with American thrash/groove metal band Exhorder as a live musician on a temporary capacity. The band played Milwaukee Metal Fest later that year in June 2026.

Critical reactions to Flesh Parade's music have been mixed. AllMusic gave the band's debut album a lukewarm review, saying it "is over almost before it begins; the impression it leaves behind is one of by-the-numbers grindcore, adding little of value to the genre as a whole." By contrast, Decibel called the band "legendary".
