= Marcus Amaker =

American poet (born 1976)

- Born: October 29, 1976 (age 50); Las Vegas, Nevada, U.S.
- Education: University of South Carolina
- Occupation: Poet
- Website: Official website

Marcus Amaker (born October 29, 1976, in Las Vegas, Nevada) is the first poet laureate of Charleston, South Carolina. He has twelve published books and, in 2021, was named an Academy of American Poets Fellow. His poetry has been recognized by PBS NewsHour, NPR, TEDx, Huffington Post, The Washington Post, Wildsam, Charleston Magazine, The Post and Courier, Charleston City Paper, Charleston Art Mag, and Charleston Regional Business Journal.

== Early life and education ==
Marcus was born in Las Vegas, Nevada to Betty and Willie Amaker, who were stationed there because of the Air Force. The family moved to England, Maryland, Japan and Texas before moving to South Carolina. Marcus' family is from Orangeburg, South Carolina.

Amaker graduated from the University of South Carolina in 1999. He graduated with a bachelor's degree in Journalism. After graduation, he worked at the Anderson Independent-Mail. He later moved to Charleston in 2003 to work as a graphic designer at The Post and Courier. While at The Post and Courier, he became editor of Preview and Charleston Scene, the paper's entertainment sections.

== Career ==
=== Poetry ===
Marcus Amaker and Marjory Heath Wentworth read at Mayor John Tecklenburg's inauguration, in 2016. Shortly thereafter, Tecklenburg named Amaker Charleston, South Carolina's first poet laureate. Amaker frequently visits schools to lead poetry workshops with students. Amaker was asked to compose a poem for the removal of the John C. Calhoun statue in June, 2020.

He was also named the artist-in-residence of the Gaillard Center in 2019 and an Academy of American Poets Fellow in 2021. In 2024, he was inducted into the South Carolina Literary Hall of Fame.

=== Other work ===
In addition to poetry, Amaker is an opera librettist. His original opera, The Weight of Light, debuted at the Chicago Opera Theater in 2024.

Amaker also wrote the libretto for What the Earth Remembers, a 40-minute choral work with music by Grammy-nominated composer Shawn Okpebholo, commissioned by the Handel Choir of Baltimore in collaboration with the Baltimore Chamber Orchestra. The work, a reflection on the Earth's resilience and humanity's relationship with the natural world, is set to premiere on March 14, 2027, at Kraushaar Auditorium on the campus of Goucher College, with additional performances in Chicago, Ann Arbor, and Seattle.

He penned the lyrics for Unknown, a song cycle commissioned by UrbanArias, a DC-based opera company. It was covered by PBS Newshour and The Washington Post. Marcus' lyrics for "The Rain," a song by opera singer Will Liverman, was named one of NPR's top songs of 2021. The album received a Grammy nomination. In 2025, Rhiannon Giddens, a MacArthur Fellow, Grammy winner, and Pulitzer Prize winner, sang Amaker's words on the Grammy-nominated album Songs in Flight by Shawn Okpebholo.

He's also a graphic designer, web designer, videographer and musician. He was the lead graphic designer for the national music journal No Depression for eight years. As a musician, he has released more than 45 albums under the alias tape loop. He's also released three albums with Grammy-winning drummer/producer Quentin E. Baxter of Ranky Tanky.

His re-written version of "My Country, 'Tis of Thee" was performed by the Washington National Opera for President Biden's inauguration in 2021.

== Awards and honors ==
- Charleston, South Carolina poet laureate (2016–2022)
- Inducted into the South Carolina Literary Hall of Fame (2024)
- Fresh Voice in the Humanities arts award from South Carolina Humanities
- 2023 Emanuel Nine Humanitarian Award Honoree
- Named Best Local Poet by Charleston City Paper readers in 2024 and 2026
- Rhiannon Giddens, a MacArthur Fellow ("Genius Grant" recipient), Grammy winner, and Pulitzer Prize winner, sang Amaker's words on the Grammy-nominated album Songs in Flight by Shawn Okpebholo (2025)
- South Carolina Press Association, 2007: First Place in page design (daily division, over 80,000)
- South Carolina Press Association, 2008: First Place in feature page design (daily division, over 80,000); First Place in entertainment section (all daily division)

== Poetry books ==
- We Deserve a World Without War. 2025. Free Verse Press. ISBN 979-8987163276
- The Color of Carina's Dreams. 2025. Free Verse Press. ISBN 979-8993436111
- Hold What Makes You Whole. 2023. Free Verse Press. ISBN 978-1734673722
- Black Music Is. 2021. Free Verse Press. ISBN 978-1-7374696-0-5
- The Birth of All Things. 2020. Free Verse Press. ISBN 978-1-7346737-0-8
- Empath. 2018. Createspace. ISBN 978-1976520006
- Mantra: an interactive poetry book (second edition). 2016. Createspace ISBN 978-1530297511
- the spoken word: selected poems: 2003-2013. 2013. Createspace. ISBN 978-1490586755
- the present presence. 2012. Createspace. ISBN 978-1477414606
- The Soft Paper Cut: poetry and art by marcus amaker. 2007. Organic Process, LLC. ISBN 978-0979651014
- poems for augustine. 2005. Createspace. ISBN 978-1419609138
- listening to static: poetry and graphic art. 2005. Booksurge. ISBN 978-1419603860

== Music ==
Amaker began writing and recording music at age 10. He started recording under the alias tape loop in 2005, incorporating synthesizers, samples, and field recordings. tape loop's 2023 album, a machine and its threads, was released by Sufrimento Records. All other releases are self-released.

=== Discography ===
- Big Butt (1986)
- Gimme Some (1987)
- Play It (1988)
- Say No! (1988)
- Daydreamin' (1988)
- All Uv the Time (1989)
- Minimalism (2005)
- Dealate (2005)
- Escapism (2006)
- 1945 (2008)
- Lady Phoenix (2009)
- Digital Detox (2010)
- The Cassette Demos (2011)
- Sunday Rain (2011)
- Animation (2012)
- The New Foundation (with Quentin E. Baxter) (2014)
- The Drum Machine, Part 1 (2015)
- Analogue // 1 – 6 (2016–17)
- Telemaque. (2017)
- Empath (with Quentin E. Baxter) (2018)
- Open EP (2018)
- Empath (Variations) (2018)
- Creating Empty Space (2019)
- The Birth of All Things (2019)
- The Weight That Holds the Animal (2019)
- Rei (2019)
- Contagion (2020)
- Rhythm Vaccine (2020)
- subversive (2020)
- Muscle Memory (with Quentin E. Baxter) (2021)
- TEXTURE // 1 (with Concept RXCH) (2021)
- ELECTROPOEMS (2022)
- kept & let go of (2022)
- flushed & in bloom EP (2022)
- humid tombstones (2023)
- a machine and its threads (2023) (Sufrimento Records)
- tape loop live: tua lingua, march 16, 2024 (2024)
- tape loop live: local 616, march 23, 2024 (2024)
- earth poems (2024)
- 9 letters to artificial intelligence EP (2024)
- threshold 1–3 (2024)
- TEXTURE // 2 (with Concept RXCH) (2025)
- dust, kick, and snare (2025)
- you hold the sound of the future in yr hands (as maya-zen) (2025)
- melt. (2026)
