= Assück =

American grindcore band

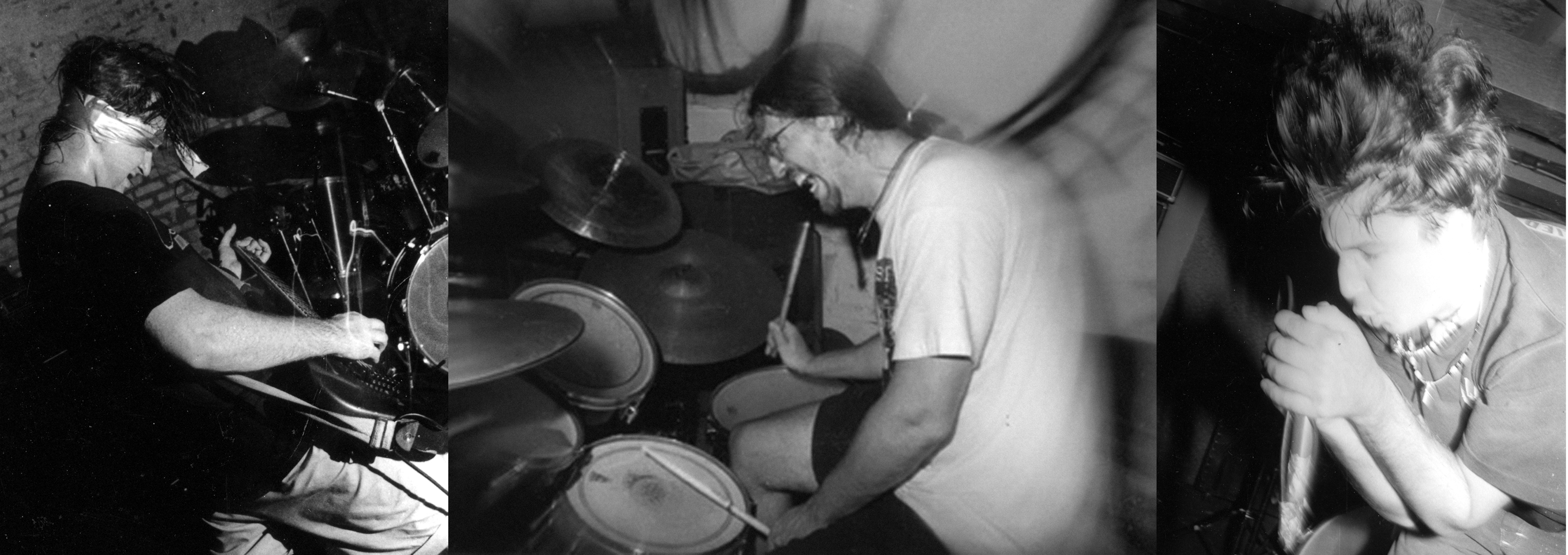
- Assück in 1992. L-R: Steve Heritage, Rob Proctor, Paul Pavlovich

Background information
- Origin: St. Petersburg, Florida, U.S.
- Genres: Grindcore; anarcho-punk; deathgrind
- Years active: 1988–1998
- Labels: Allied; Ax/ction; Common Cause; Forfeit; Goatsucker; Join the Team Player; La Caliya Project; Liquefied Tapes; Mordam; No Idea; No System; Open; Rigid; Ripping Headaches; Schematics; Slap-a-Ham; Smell of Silence; SOA; Sound Pollution; Troubleman Unlimited
- Past members: Steve Heritage; Jason Crittendon; Rob Proctor; Steve Kosiba; Daryl Kahan; Pete Jay; Dave Malinksky; Paul Pavlovich

Assück was an American grindcore band from St. Petersburg, Florida, active from 1988 to 1998. During their existence, they released two studio albums, numerous EPs, and various tracks on compilation albums. The band has been described as a touchstone for grindcore, with their second and final album, Misery Index, cited as one of the best and most essential records within the genre.

== History ==
Drummer Rob Proctor, vocalist Paul Pavlovich, and guitarist Steve Heritage founded Assück. The band went through several line-up changes, changing vocalists four times. Despite these changes, Assück maintained its heavy and fast sound and anarchist sensibilities from its first release to its last.

=== Origins and earliest recordings ===
In the middle to late 1980s, Proctor, Pavlovich, and Heritage attended Boca Ciega High School in St. Petersburg, Florida. In 1987, Pavlovich (bass), Heritage (vocals), and two other friends formed a band called Toilet Birth. The band was intended to be fast hardcore punk with a crude name that was a blatant variant on Septic Death, a foundational influence for Assück. The band members were 16 and 17 years old at the time. Toilet Birth was short-lived, recorded no material, and played only a small number of shows and house parties.

Sometime in mid-to-late 1988, Proctor, Pavlovich, and Heritage played together for the first time. The trio rehearsed at Proctor’s parents' house, which was a few blocks from their high school. The name Assück, a contraction of the words ass and suck, was meant to be offensive and was a runner-up option from the Toilet Birth era. They stylized the name with an umlaut to emulate bands like The Accüsed, Beowülf, Motörhead, and Spın̈al Tap and in doing so conceived it as trolling the gratuitous use of metal umlauts in band names. Assück’s earliest songs include "Acidic Death", "Conform", and "Wall of Shame". At the outset, Assück’s intent was to be absurdist and play at chaotic speeds with unintelligible vocals.

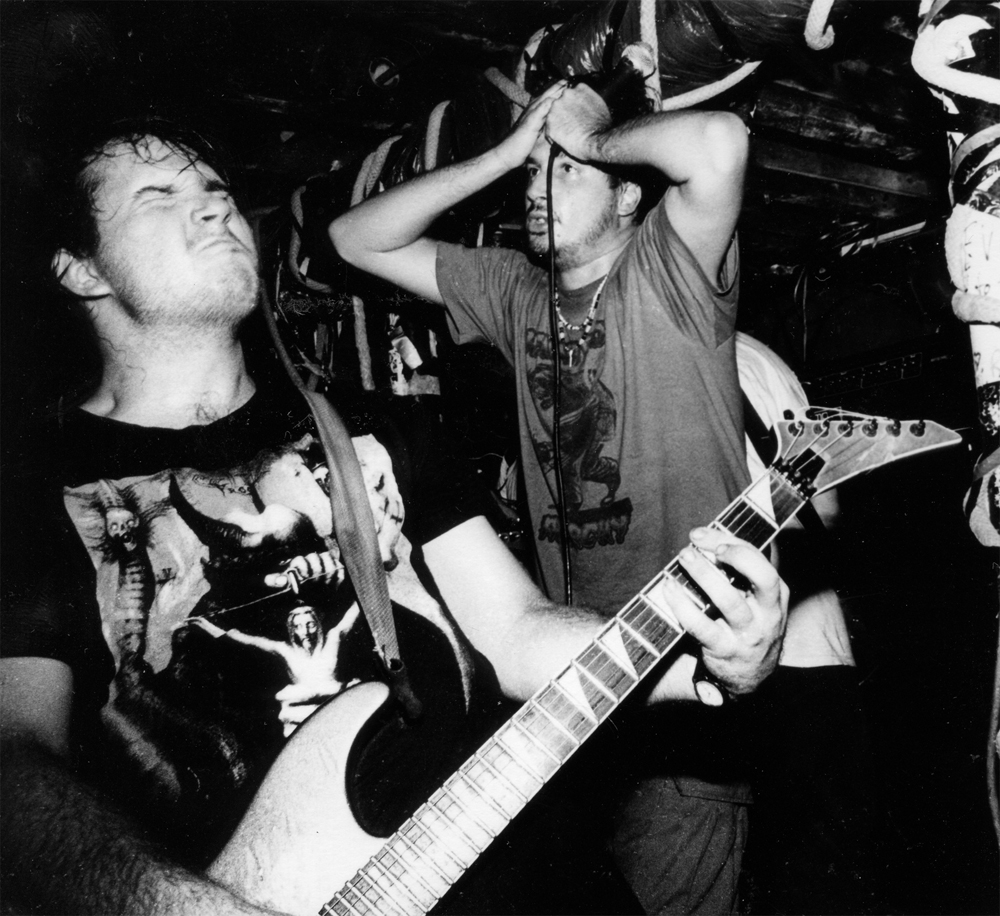
Assück performing at ABC No Rio

After a few months of rehearsals and small shows, Assück recorded a 17-song demo cassette, Born Backwards, in early April 1989 at a small garage studio in Pinellas County, Florida. The cassette's cover art was drawn by Pavlovich and was photocopied at the Main St. Petersburg Public Library. The band dubbed copies of the cassette themselves and first sold them on April 8, 1989 at a concert billed as “Slamfest 89”, held at Jannus Landing in St. Petersburg. At that show, Assück opened for Tampa Bay area hardcore bands Slap of Reality, Awake, No Fraud, and Pagan Faith.

Assück recorded their debut EP, Necrosalvation, with engineer Scott Burns at Morrisound Recording Studio on November 13, 1989. The session included five new tracks and six re-recorded tracks from the Born Backwards demo. That date also marks the release of Terrorizer's World Downfall album on Earache Records — recorded with the same engineer, at the same studio, and in the same room as Assück's Necrosalvation.

== Legacy and reception ==
The band was influential, with their album Anticapital voted number 4 in the Terrorizer list of their top 20 US grindcore albums. Terrorizer described the record as a "low-calibre battery of brooding, malicious, doom-ridden grind pitched somewhere between early Napalm Death and even earlier Bolt Thrower."

According to journalist Greg Pratt, "Assück were an incredible band with probably metal's best drummer, Rob Proctor, although no one ever mentions his name. They combined well-written poetic and political lyrics with catchy songs, insane musicianship and a short-fast-loud brutality that no one has topped since." In a retrospective article for Decibel Magazine, Pratt stated that despite the short runtime of Anticapital, the album has "changed extreme music history." He explained that the record shows the failings of society though inspires change through its poetically despairing lyrics and charging bass drum leads.

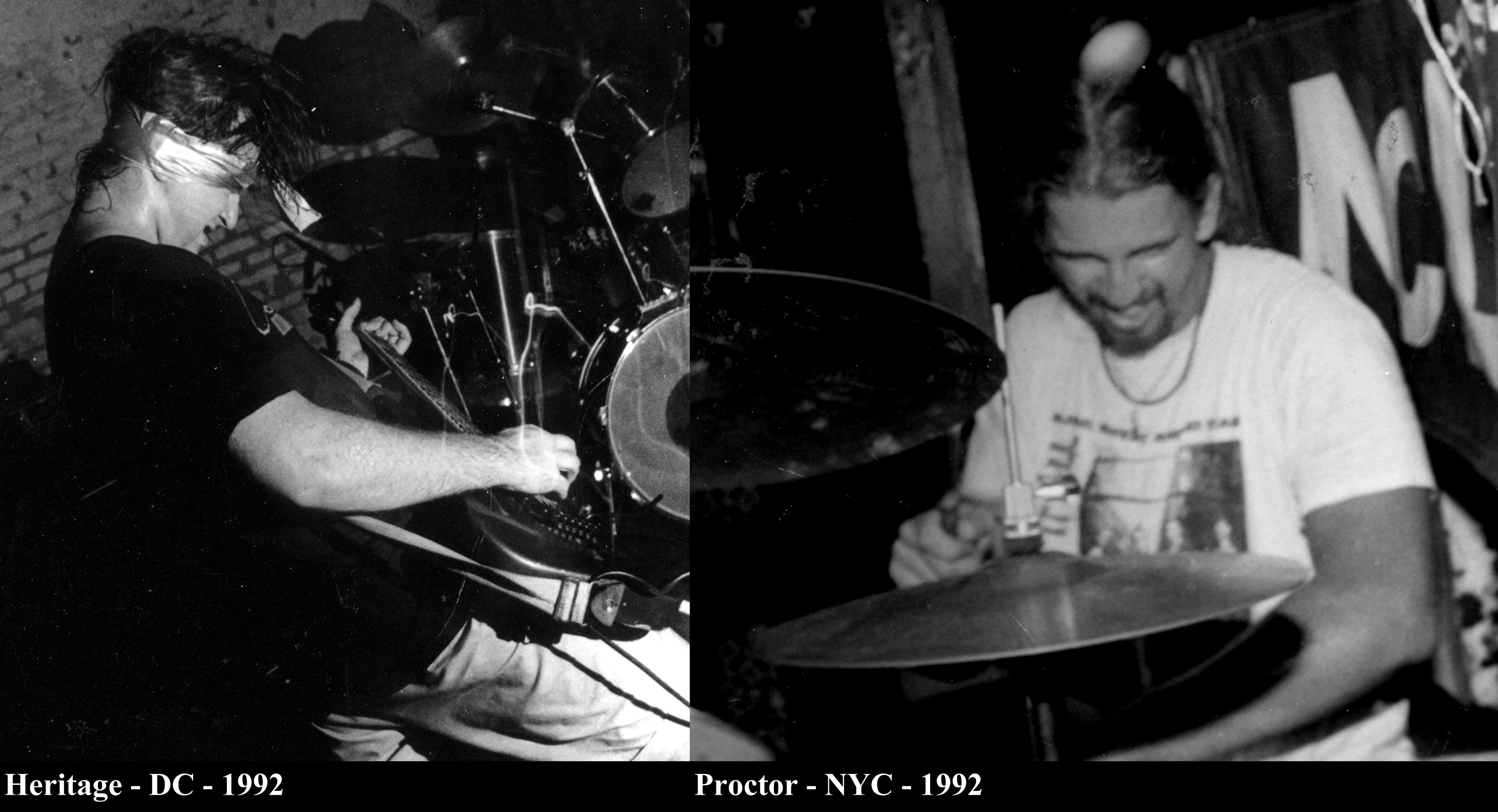
Assück performing in 1992

Jeff Terich of Treblezine listed their second and final album, Misery Index, as one of the most essential grindcore records, stating that the album "stands as a document of grindcore at its gimmick-free best" and describing the instrumental abilities displayed throughout it as "inhuman witchery".

Damien Beard of Reverb.com described Steve Heritage as an iconic and defining guitarist of '90s hardcore punk, noting the metal influence and complexity of his riffing as Assück's best work. He deemed the band a "behemoth of combination of crust-punk anger and heavy metal musicianship", emphasizing their sound as short bursts of fury accompanied by tempo shifts and breakdowns. Additionally, Beard characterized Rob Proctor as a "inhuman beast of a drummer" for his timed stops.

Writing for Maximumrocknroll, Felix Von Havoc described the political punk and metal roots of the band, stating "Assück managed to combine the anger, fury and social commentary of a punk band with the musicianship and production quality of a death metal band."

== Members ==
Final line-up

- Rob Proctor - drums (1988–1998)
- Steve Heritage - vocals, guitar (1988–1998)
- Jason Crittendon - bass (1998)

Former members

- Paul Pavlovich - vocals (1988–1993)
- Daryl Kahan - vocals (1993–1994)
- Dave "Spinach" Malinksky - vocals (1994–1995)
- Pete Jay - bass (1991–1992)
- Steve Kosiba - bass (1992–1998)

Timeline

== Paul Pavlovich ==
Paul Pavlovich (born March 3, 1970) is an American artist, graphic designer, and musician. Currently living in St. Petersburg, Florida, he is best known as the first vocalist for Assück, which he co-founded in 1988. In October 2008, IGN Entertainment named Pavlovich one of the '10 Best Death Metal Singers' stating "In terms of the guys doing the deeper or what some fans call "guttural" vocal style, Pavlovich is in an elite class".

Since his departure from the band in 1992, Pavlovich shifted his attention to visual art and design. After graduating from the Ringling School of Art and Design in 1994, Pavlovich spent a period of time in New York City developing his unique system of painting and image making. During his short residence in the Park Slope neighborhood of Brooklyn, New York, Pavlovich spent several months rehearsing with the band Cattle Press.

Pavlovich returned to the Tampa Bay area with a developed body of artwork which he began showing in group shows. In 2002 Pavlovich was selected to show several works at the Tampa Museum of Art. In 2004 Pavlovich was approached by curator Timothy Warner of the Covivant Gallery in Tampa who was interested in organizing Pavlovich's first solo exhibit of work entitled "Temporary Past Life" which received praise from national and local media. Pavlovich continues his visual work which has been widely seen in both print and web-media.

In late 2004, Pavlovich was asked by longtime friend and guitarist Sam Williams to contribute vocals to a recording project called Track the Curse. In 2006, the album The New Land was released by the Tennessee label Spins Good Records, and They've Taken Everything in 2007.

Pavlovich appeared as a guest vocalist on the 2014 album, Longhena, by technical grindcore band Gridlink, contributing on the track "Chalk Maple".

In 2018, Pavlovich founded his own label called Roman Numeral Records, and also formed a new grindcore band called Alphanumeric, whose debut EP was released in 2019 through Roman Numeral.

== Discography ==
Studio albums

- Anticapital (1991, Sound Pollution)
- Misery Index (1997, Sound Pollution)

Extended plays

- Born Backwards demo tape (1989, Liquified Tapes)
- Necrosalvation 7-inch (1990, Rigid Records)
- Split 7-inch with Old Lady Drivers (1990, No System)
- Blindspot 7-inch (1992, Open Records)
- State To State 7-inch (1992, SOA)

Compilation albums

- Anticapital / Blindspot / +3 (1994, Sound Pollution)
- Discography 1989-1998 (2017, Blastasfuk Grindcore)
