= F-Letter =

Studio album by Frodus
- Released: July 23, 1996
- Recorded: January 1996 at Salad Days Studios in Boston, MA
- Genre: Post-hardcore
- Length: 42:17
- Labels: Double Deuce NYC, Magic Bullet, Fan The Flames

Frodus chronology
Fireflies (1995)	F-Letter (1996)	Conglomerate International (1998)

Alternate cover
- Magic Bullet reissue (2003)

F-Letter is the third studio album by post-hardcore band Frodus, originally released in 1996 through Double Duece NYC. To fund the recording for the album, Shelby Cinca sold a virtual reality helmet at a Doom tournament held by a now-defunct computer store. The album has been reissued many times on both CD and vinyl formats through a variety of record labels.

== Reception ==
The Washington Post's Mark Jenkins described the album as "urgent but often one-dimensional" and opined that "the howls of the band's two singers, bassist Howard Pyle and guitarist Shelby Cinca, offer little contrast to the bristling instruments."

== Track listing ==
All tracks are written by Frodus.

No.	Title	Length
1.	"The Feelgood Song of the Year"	2:34
2.	"Wardialer"	5:12
3.	"Formula"	3:22
4.	"Factory 6"	3:37
5.	"Cha-Chi"	1:48
6.	"Anthem"	3:37
7.	"Dumb Terminal"	3:48
8.	"Swingset"	3:53
9.	"f-letter"	2:55
10.	"22-d10"	2:41
11.	"Buick Commission"	8:50

2003 Reissue Bonus Tracks
No.	Title	Length
12.	"Reign of Emperor Norton 1st"	1:39
13.	"Cha-Chi (English version)"	2:02
14.	"Hit Liquor C."	0:13
15.	"Theme from Loveboat"	0:33
Total length:		46:44

== Personnel ==
=== Performers ===
- Shelby Cinca - Vocals, guitar, percussion on "Factory Six"
- Jason Hamacher - Drums, percussion on "Factory Six"
- Howard Pyle - Bass, vocals
- Brian McTernan - Screams and cymbals on "Buick Commission", percussion on "Factory Six"

=== Artwork ===
- Will Weems - Artwork, photography, layout (original 1996 version)
- Chapplle Conant - Photography (original 1996 version)
- Prof. Yaya - Design, art direction (2003 version)
- David S. Holloway - Photography (2003 version)
- Shelby Cinca - Layout (2013 version)

=== Production ===
- Brian McTernan - Recording
- Howard Pyle - Mixing (original 1996 version)
- Chad Clark - Mixing (2003 reissue)

== Release history ==
Region	Date	Label	Format	Catalog	Notes
United States	July 23, 1996	Double Deuce NYC	CD	DDR10	Original version
United States	August 8, 1996	Art Monk Construction/Lovitt Records	LP	AMC 15.5, LOV004	First vinyl press
United States	October 23, 2003	Magic Bullet Records	CD	MBL037	First reissue, includes bonus tracks and alternative artwork
United States	December 17, 2013	Fan The Flames Records	LP	FtF002	First vinyl reissue, limited to 500 copies on translucent red vinyl, comes in a hand pressed sleeve with silk-screened art
