= No Fraud =

American band

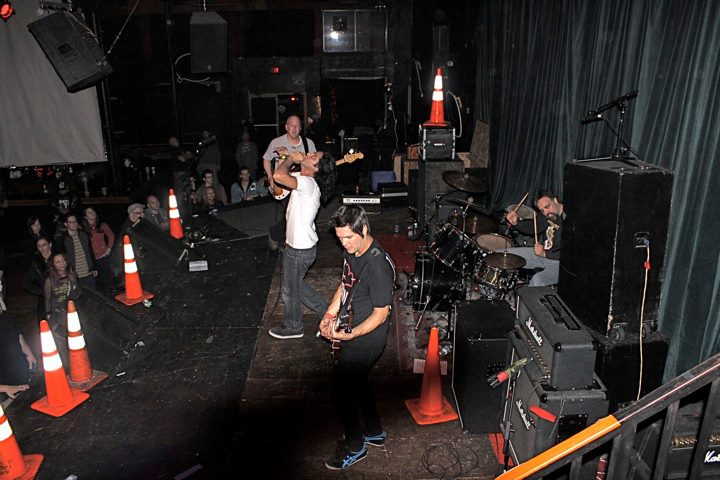
- No Fraud in concert. We Can't Help It If We're From Tampa tour. December, 2012.

Background information
- Origin: Venice, Florida, U.S.
- Genres: Hardcore punk, punk rock, thrashcore, anarcho-punk, thrash metal
- Years active: 1983–present
- Labels: ¡No Clubs! Records, Truth Records, Nuclear Blast records, Goddam Church Records, Mind Control Records, Stiff Pole Records, New Wave Records, Six Weeks Records
- Members: Dan Destructo Walter Rossmann; Joe Kiser Gregg Moore
- Past members: Buzz Cockrill Mike Shenkin; Dave Mahoney; Terry Huber; Pete Jay; Scott Pacer; Rob Rampy; Dean Tsoupeis; James Steele; Doug Burns Rob Proctor

No Fraud is an American hardcore punk/thrash metal band from Venice, Florida, United States, that formed with members Dan Destructo on guitar and vocals, Buzz Cockrill on bass and Mike Shenkin on drums. The band has added different members since its origin. No Fraud is known for their fast music and wild, energized live shows.

Since 1984, No Fraud has released several albums, EPs, singles, and compilations. They have played with bands such as Agnostic Front, Suicidal Tendencies, Fang, Circle Jerks, Bad Brains, M.D.C., Scream, and the U.K. Subs and continue to tour and record.

== History ==
=== Origins ===
Soon after No Fraud formed in 1983, they were playing shows outside of their hometown of Venice, Florida, and added guitarist Dave Mahoney to their line-up. In 1984, they began recording their demo tapes and guitarist Terry Huber joined the band.

No Fraud released Demo Tape #1 in 1985 to rave reviews. Maximum RocknRoll (MMR) lauded Demo Tape #1 writing that it was a necessary addition to music collections. Likewise, Suburban Voice called Demo Tape #1 a "roaring blitzkrieg of tight, spirited aggression."

After Demo Tape #1 was released, No Fraud received offers from many national and international record companies including Caroline Records, Poshboy Records and Rotten Records. The band released their first 7-inch EP, titled The E.P. on ¡No Clubs! Records in 1986. No Fraud formed their own label and a second pressing of The E.P. was released on Truth Records in 1986. The E.P. received many favorable reviews. Maximum RocknRoll called The E.P. passionate, high-velocity thrash and Suburban Voice noted that The E.P. was "pure aggression."

After touring the east coast and Canada, No Fraud recorded their 12-inch album, Hard To The Core in 1987 with guitarist Pete Jay and drummer Scott Pacer joining the band. Hard To The Core was released on Nuclear Blast records of West Germany in 1988.

In 1991, No Fraud released the 7-inch EP titled Elected on Stiff Pole Records. The band covered Alice Cooper's 1972 single "Elected" and Ron Miller of the Florida punk rock band Belching Penguin (B.P.) plays drums on this track. During this period, No Fraud toured extensively throughout the United States and was joined by new members Rob Rampy on drums and Dean Tsoupeis on bass.

In 1991, No Fraud released the album Love & Massmurder on Mind Control Records. The album features a demo No Fraud recorded in 1989 titled Cheezier Than Thou. Love & Massmurder also contains the out-of-print 1986 E.P. and Hard To The Core. Three more tracks from the Hard To The Core sessions are also included on the album: "L.I.F.E." from the compilation Revenge of the Kamikaze From Outer Space, "Changes" from the compilation The North Atlantic Noise Attack and "Aggression" from the Attack Is Now Suicide compilation.

In 1993, the band released the eponymously titled 7-inch EP No Fraud on French label New Wave Records. Rob Proctor of the band Assück played drums on the band's track "I Don't Know You Do I?" on No Fraud.

Soon after the No Fraud EP was released, the band reformed again and the line-up was Doug Burns on bass guitar, Walter Rossmann on drums and Dan Destructo on guitar and vocals. There is a limited demo from this era called Paradise Lost, however, the first official release from this time are six songs on a 1995 Stiff Pole Records compilation titled Six Pack To Go. James Steele joined the band on guitar at this time.

In 1996, No Fraud released the 7-inch EP Babewatch. The title track off Babewatch is a parody of the popular television show Baywatch. Gregg Moore joined the band by this time and plays bass on these recordings.

=== Current activity and projects ===
In December 2012, No Fraud was featured in a documentary film titled We Can't Help It If We're From Tampa, written and produced by writer Tony Patino. The film featured interviews and concert clips of popular bands that toured and played from and/or in the Tampa Bay, Florida area. A tour throughout Florida in support of the release of We Can't Help It If We're From Tampa took place in December 2012 and featured No Fraud and other bands in the documentary, including Fang.

No Fraud has released a new album and CD on Six Weeks Records "Revolt! 1984 Demos" containing recordings which pre-date any previous release. They are scheduled to record a new E.P. over the summer of 2013. The 2014 tour is booking for October on the West Coast of the United States.

== Discography ==
=== 12-Inch LPs ===
Album	Release date	Label
Demo Tape No.1	1985	NA
Hard To The Core	1988	Nuclear Blast records
Love And Massmurder	1991	Mind Control Records
Revolt! 1984 Demos	2014	Six Weeks Records

=== Singles and EPs ===
Album	Release date	Label
The E.P.	1986	¡No Clubs! Records
Elected	1993	Stiff Pole records
No Fraud	1991	New Wave records
Babewatch	1996	Truth Music

=== Compilations ===
Album	Release date	Label
People Of The Pit	1986	Goddam Church Records (Italy)
Six Pack To Go Releases	1995	Stiff Pole Records

=== Videos ===
Title	Release date	Writer/Producer
We Can't Help It If We're From Tampa	December 2012	Tony Patino

== Members ==
=== Current members ===
- Dan Destructo
- Walter Rossmann
- Joe Kiser
- Gregg Moore

=== Past members ===
- Buzz Cockrill
- Mike Shenkin
- Dave Mahoney
- Terry Huber
- Sean McCord
- Pete Jay
- Scott Pacer
- Rob Rampy
- Dean Tsoupeis
- James Steele
- Doug Burns
- Rob Proctor
