= Toshi Yano =

American bass guitarist

Toshi Yano is an American rock musician who plays bass and keyboard. He was a founding member of the Washington, D.C., hardcore band Battery, the New York hardcore band Violent Bullshit, and Kapow!, a Brooklyn-based band. Yano also worked as a recording and mixing engineer.

Kapow! was an eight-piece band, fronted by Yano, which included Tris McCall on keyboards and The Negatones frontmen Jay and Justin Braun. In 2005, the New York Times wrote that Kapow! was "old-fashioned, but frequently irresistible," featuring the "vocal harmonies and garage-rock riffs" characteristic of late-1960s pop music. They released a three-song demo recording, which included "In regard to the Children," "Girl," and "Make You Mine." Kapow! remained active into 2008.

Yano was a touring member of The Fiery Furnaces from 2003 to 2005, playing bass and keyboards on world tours with the band. During that period, Yano temporarily joined Franz Ferdinand on tour when bassist Bob Hardy was hospitalized.

Yano is currently Director of Horticulture at Wethersfield Estate and Gardens.
