= Longhena (album) =

Studio album by Gridlink
- Released: February 19, 2014
- Recorded: Inoue Recording
- Genre: Grindcore
- Length: 21:22
- Labels: Selfmadegod Records; Handshake Inc.
- Producers: Kevin Antreassian, James Plotkin

Gridlink chronology
Orphan (2011)	Longhena (2014)	Coronet Juniper (2023)

Longhena is the third full-length studio album by technical grindcore band Gridlink, released in 2014. It was the band's final release before entering hiatus later that year.

== Track listing ==
No.	Title	Length
1.	"Constant Autumn"	2:01
2.	"The Last Raven"	1:37
3.	"Thirst Watcher"	2:16
4.	"Stay Without Me"	0:49
5.	"Taibas"	1:19
6.	"Retract Perdition"	0:41
7.	"The Dodonpachi"	1:54
8.	"Black Prairie"	1:08
9.	"Island Sun"	2:28
10.	"Chalk Maple"	1:04
11.	"Wartime Exception Law 205"	0:29
12.	"Ketsui"	1:00
13.	"Longhena"	1:25
14.	"Look to Windward"	3:11

== Personnel ==
=== Gridlink ===
- Matsubara - guitar
- Patterson - bass guitar
- Fajardo - drums
- Chang - vocals

=== Session musicians ===
- Joey Molinaro - violin
- Paul Pavlovich (Alphanumeric, ex-Assück, ex-Track the Curse)- vocals on "Chalk Maple"

=== Production staff ===
- James Plotkin - vinyl mastering
- Kevin Antreassian - digital mastering, recording, mixing
- Jon Chang - layout, art direction, photography
- Stephen Ciucolli - photography
- Nea Dune - model
