= Conglomerate International =

Studio album by Frodus
- Released: March 10, 1998
- Recorded: December 12–22, 1997
- Genre: Post-hardcore
- Length: 43:50
- Label: Tooth & Nail Records
- Producer: Jonathan Kreinik

Frodus chronology
F-Letter (1996)	Conglomerate International (1998)	And We Washed Our Weapons in the Sea (2001)

Professional ratings
Review scores
Source	Rating
Allmusic	2.5/5 stars

Conglomerate International is the fourth studio album by American post-hardcore band Frodus, released in 1998 through Tooth & Nail Records.

== Themes ==
The album focuses largely on the theme of corporatism. Singer-guitarist Shelby Cinca has stated that the album "was a reflection on the 1990s, when people were buying a lot of SUVs, and people were excited about franchise opportunities and corporate entities such as Starbucks. The homogenization of culture."

== Track listing ==
All tracks are written by Frodus, except for 'Explosions", written by Devo.

No.	Title	Length
1.	"Intention: Removal"	3:22
2.	"The Misaligned Men of Flomaton"	2:34
3.	"Invisible Time-Lines"	2:59
4.	"Deviant Recovery Network"	1:39
5.	"Chrome Corridors"	2:37
6.	"Down with Flames"	3:46
7.	"Transmissions Of An Unknown Origin"	5:17
8.	"Explosions"	3:28
9.	"Last View"	2:25
10.	"Drone Academy Fight Song"	3:16
11.	"Conditioned"	3:11
12.	"The Day Buildings Mysteriously Vanished"	3:37
13.	"Psaurcacneosisa (Success in Paranoia)"	5:39

== Personnel ==
=== Performers ===
- Nathan Burke - Bass, vocals
- Jason Hamacher - Drums, backing vocals
- Shelby Cinca - Guitar, vocals
- Jonathan Kreinik - Guitar (on "Last View"), keyboards (on "Transmissions Of An Unknown Origin" and "Explosions")

=== Production ===
- Prof. Yaya - Layout, photography (credited as "Eye")
- Tim Owen - Photography (Back cover and band photographs)
- Uniphoto - Photography (Front cover)
- Jonathan Kreinik - Production
- Kurt Ballou - Production on pre-production demos
- Bruce Kane - Recording, mixing
