= Thomas Hamacher =

German physicist (born 1964)

Thomas Hamacher (born 12 April 1964 in Eschweiler) is a German physicist and professor in energy system research at the Technical University of Munich.

== Biography ==
Thomas Hamacher studied physics at Bonn University, at RWTH Aachen and at Columbia University, New York. He received his Doctorate in Natural Sciences (Dr. rer. nat.) from the University of Hamburg in 1994 for his work on baryonic beta decay. He worked between 1996 and 2010 at the Max Planck Institute of Plasma Physics in Garching bei München and was head of the Energy and System Studies Group. Since 2010, he has been a professor at the Department of Electrical Engineering and Computer Science at the Technical University of Munich. In 2013, he was appointed Full Professor for the Chair of Renewable and Sustainable Energy Systems.

Thomas Hamacher takes part frequently in public debates about the German Energy transition in Germany, nuclear power and fusion power as an expert. His main research focus lies on the modeling, analysis, and design of energy systems in the context of disruptive technologies such as nuclear fusion, renewable energy, smart cities, or electromobility.
