= Gaillard Center =

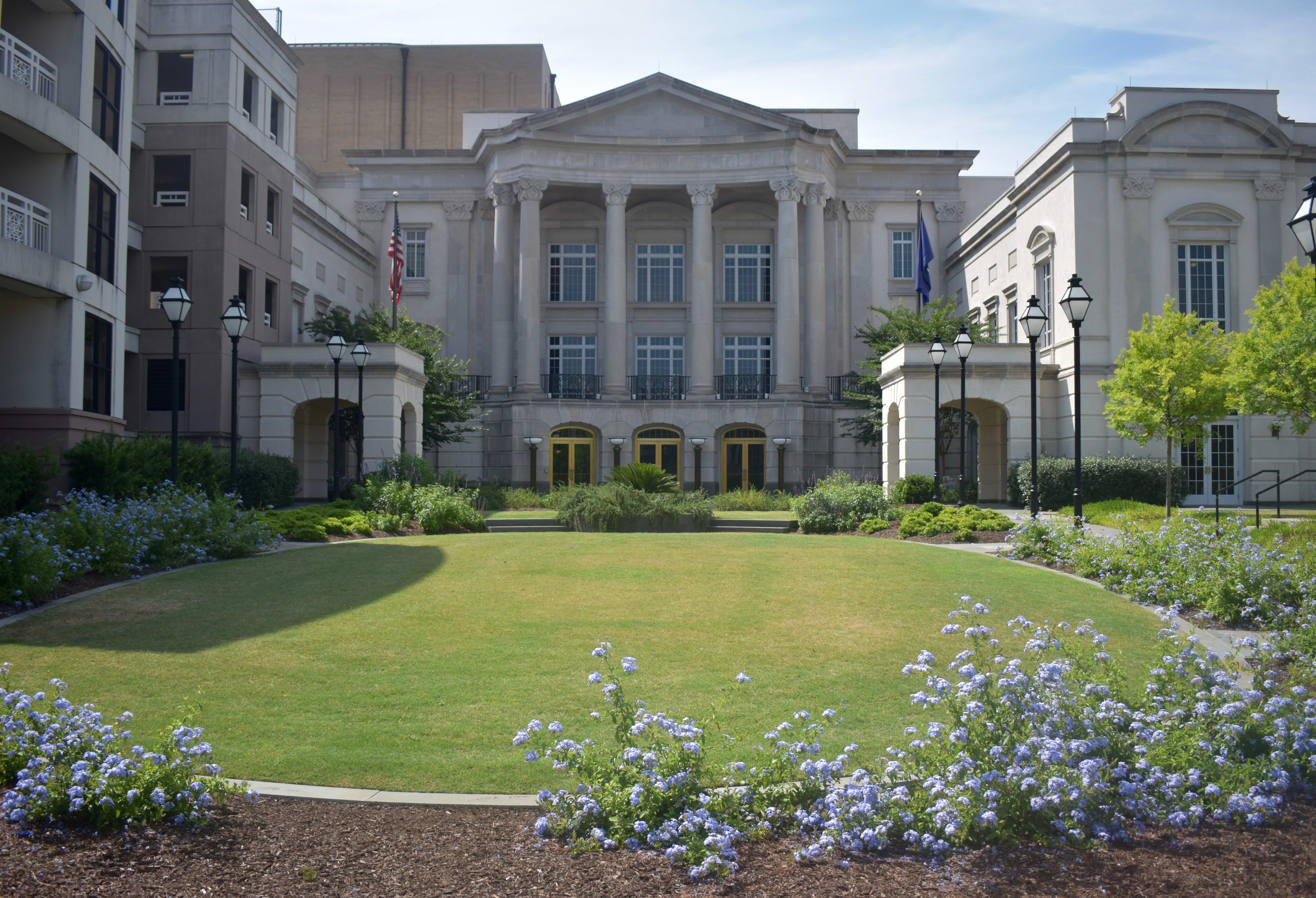
- The Gaillard Center, 2019

General information
- Status: Completed
- Type: Mixed Use
- Architectural style: Renaissance Revival
- Location: 95 Calhoun Street, Charleston, South Carolina, United States
- Coordinates: 32°47′12.81″N 79°55′50.14″W
- Year built: October 2015
- Construction started: August 2012
- Cost: US$10,000
- Owner: Charleston Gaillard Management Corporation

Dimensions
- Other dimensions: 74 m^{2} (800 sq ft) across x 178 m^{2} (1,920 sq ft) deep

Technical details
- Floor count: 3
- Floor area: 15,000 m^{2} (160,000 sq ft)

Design and construction
- Architect: David M. Schwarz Architects
- Main contractor: Skanska-Trident

Other information
- Seating capacity: 1,800 (Rivers Performance Hall)

Website
- gaillardcenter.org

The Gaillard Center is a concert hall and performance venue in Charleston, South Carolina. It opened in 2015 and replaced the Gaillard Municipal Auditorium. Both buildings were named after John Palmer Gaillard Jr., mayor of Charleston from 1959 to 1975.

== First facility ==
An effort to fund a convention center failed by a vote of 4627 to 3112 in 1958. In his second inaugural address in December 1963, Mayor Gaillard proposed building a civic auditorium. Prior to the construction of the first facility, African Americans primarily lived in the area it was to be located.

Mayor Gaillard appointed a special committee to investigate the possibility of building a convention center in Charleston on December 30, 1963 made of members of City Council and the public. City Council again began taking steps for a November 1964 bond referendnum in April 1964. Mayor Gaillard asked Charleston County Council to contribute $1 million toward the project, an amount which would reduce the bond issuance. A design by Frank E. Lucas and Sidney W. Stubbs, Jr. was chosen following a competition.

A special committee with three City Council members and four citizens studied several issues including the ideal location for the new auditorium. In May 1964, the committee proposed as the site for the auditorium the 6.75-acre tract bounded by Calhoun St. (north), Alexander St. (east), George St. (to be extended to East Bay St. from Anson St. along the south), and Anson St. (west). In the final report, the committee rejected the idea of placing the new complex east of the Old Citadel because there would be inadequate space. Instead, the committee recommended the area bounded by Anson Street (west), Calhoun Street (north), and Alexander Street (east). The committee also recommended extending George Street from its terminus at Anson Street by running it eastward to East Bay Street. The committee had prioritized keeping the center near the intersection of Calhoun and King Sts. (the site of the Francis Marion Hotel) so convention guests could walk to the center from hotels and motels. The committee also noted the location would result in the removal of much substandard housing without also damaging historic buildings: "This area contains one or possibly two small buildings of minor historic value, and both of them are in a terrible state of disrepair."

The original structure, the Gaillard Municipal Auditorium and Exhibition Hall, opened in July 1968.

== Current facility ==
Constructing the new facility was a central priority of mayor Joe Riley's administration. The opening, planned for early 2015 in time for the city's Spoleto Festival, was delayed by six months due to budgetary overages. Yo-Yo Ma performed at the opening of the center.

For over 40 years, Charleston's star venue held thousands of performances and civic events.

With its 1,800-seat Rivers Performance Hall and a large multipurpose exhibition facility, the Gaillard became Charleston's largest performing arts venue. The Gaillard became home to the Charleston Symphony Orchestra in the early 1980s, and with the founding of Spoleto Festival USA in 1977, it helped propel Charleston onto the world stage.

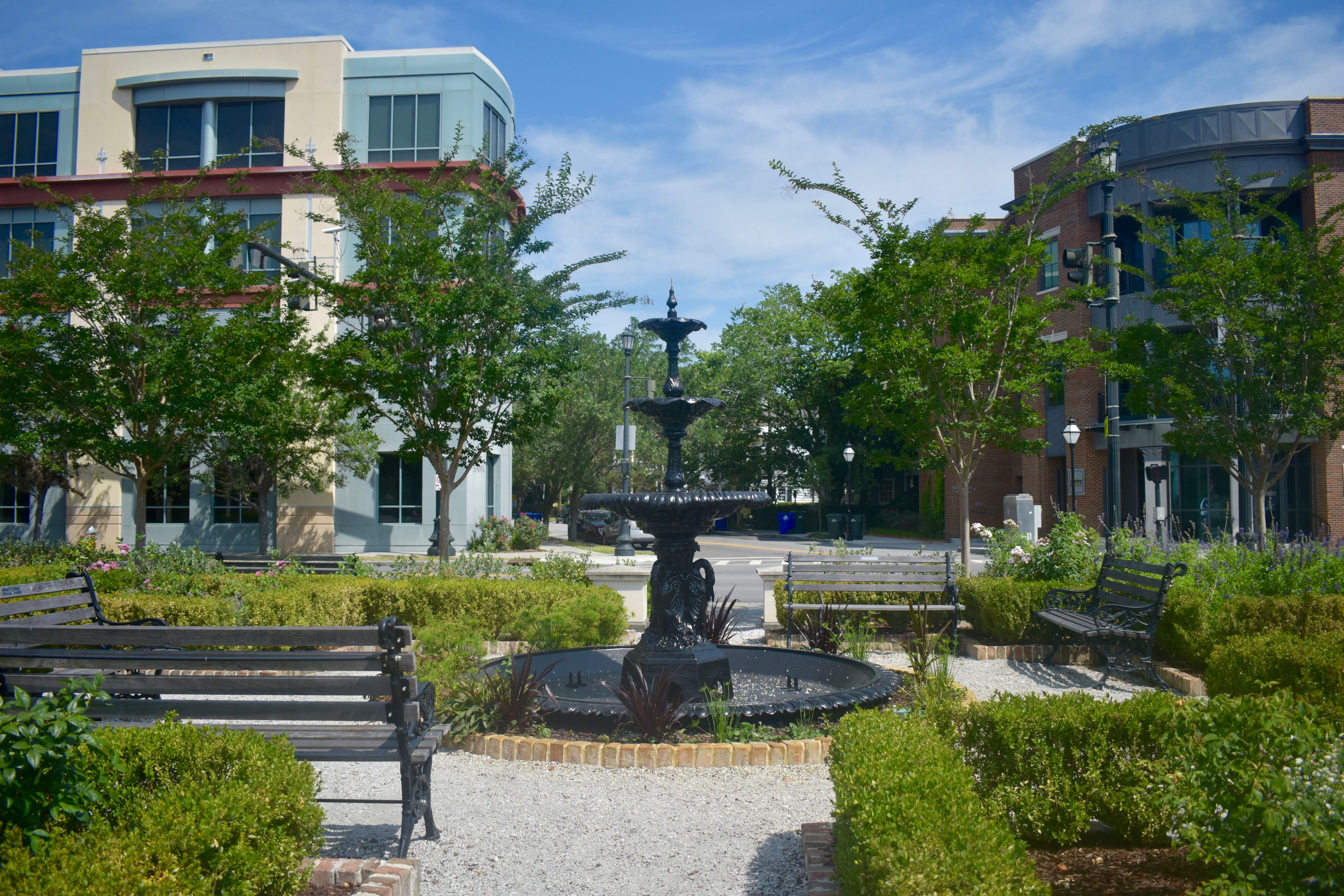
Noisette Garden at Gaillard Center

== Gallery ==
The Historic Charleston Foundation relocated a few of the houses to save them from demolition. The double tenement at 85 Calhoun St. was left in place and restored by the Historic Charleston Foundation. The house at 116 Anson St. was moved to an unknown location on Laurens St. in 1966.

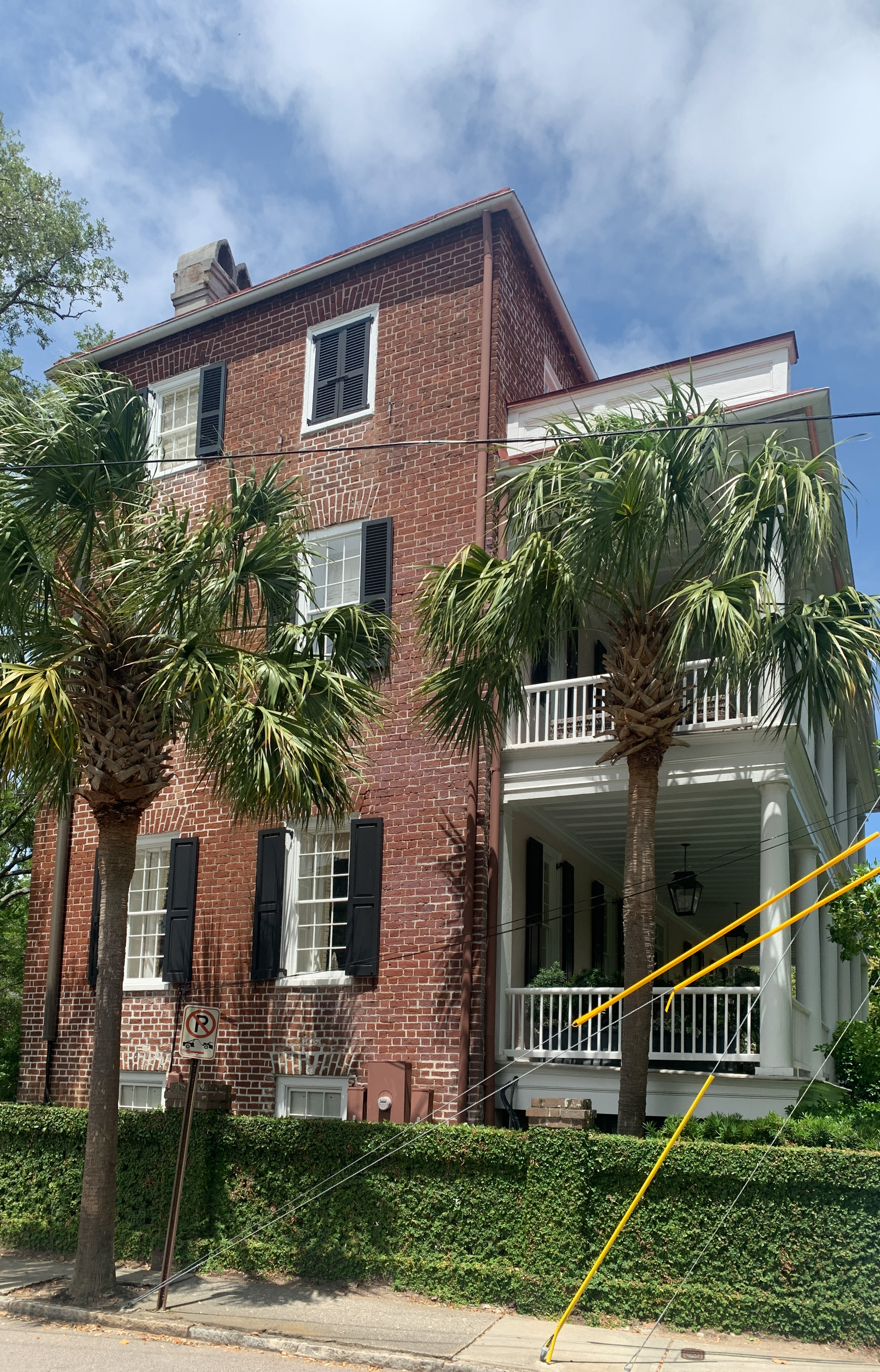
82 Anson St. was moved from 86 Anson St.

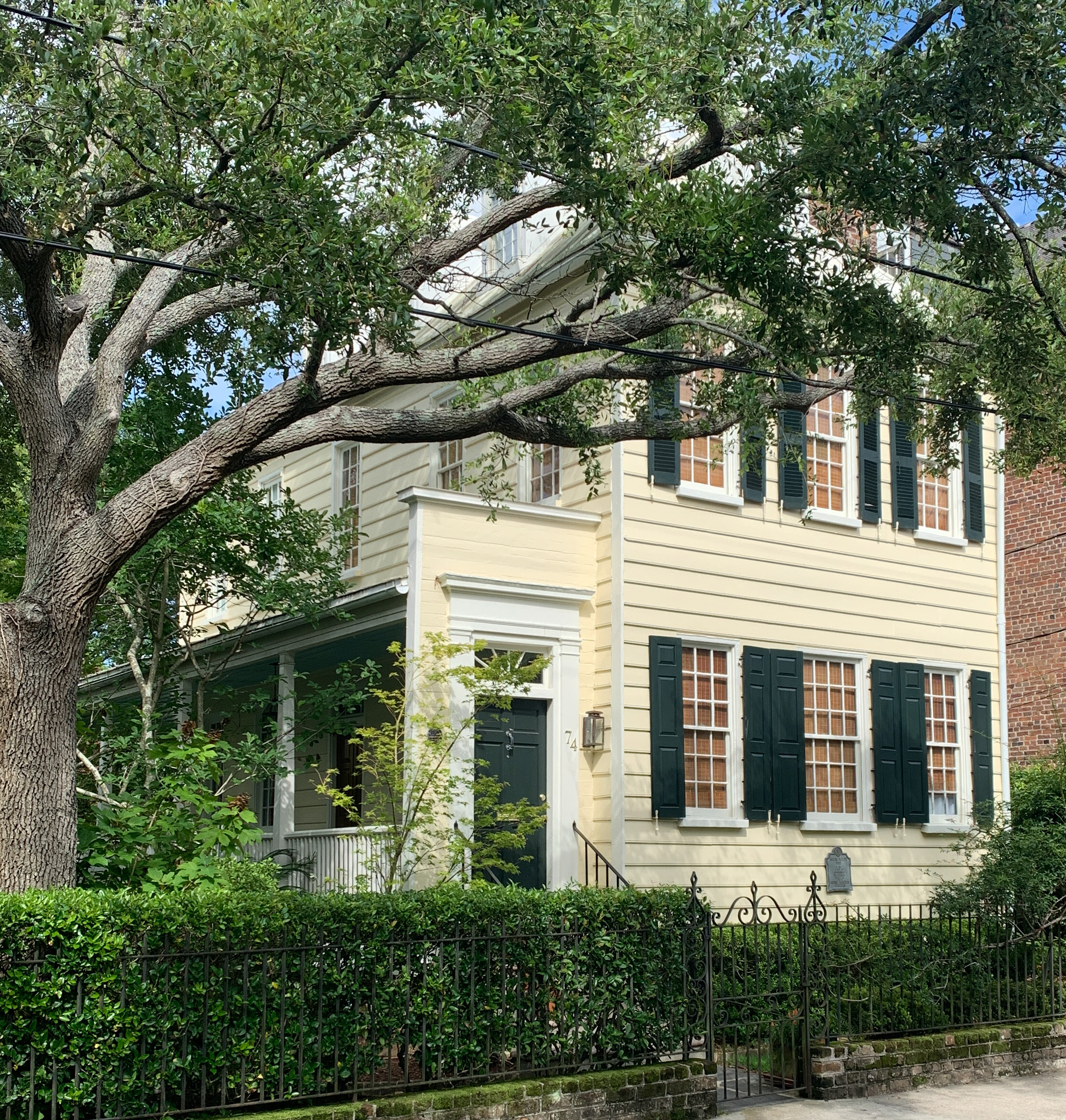
74 Anson St. was moved from 15 Wall St.

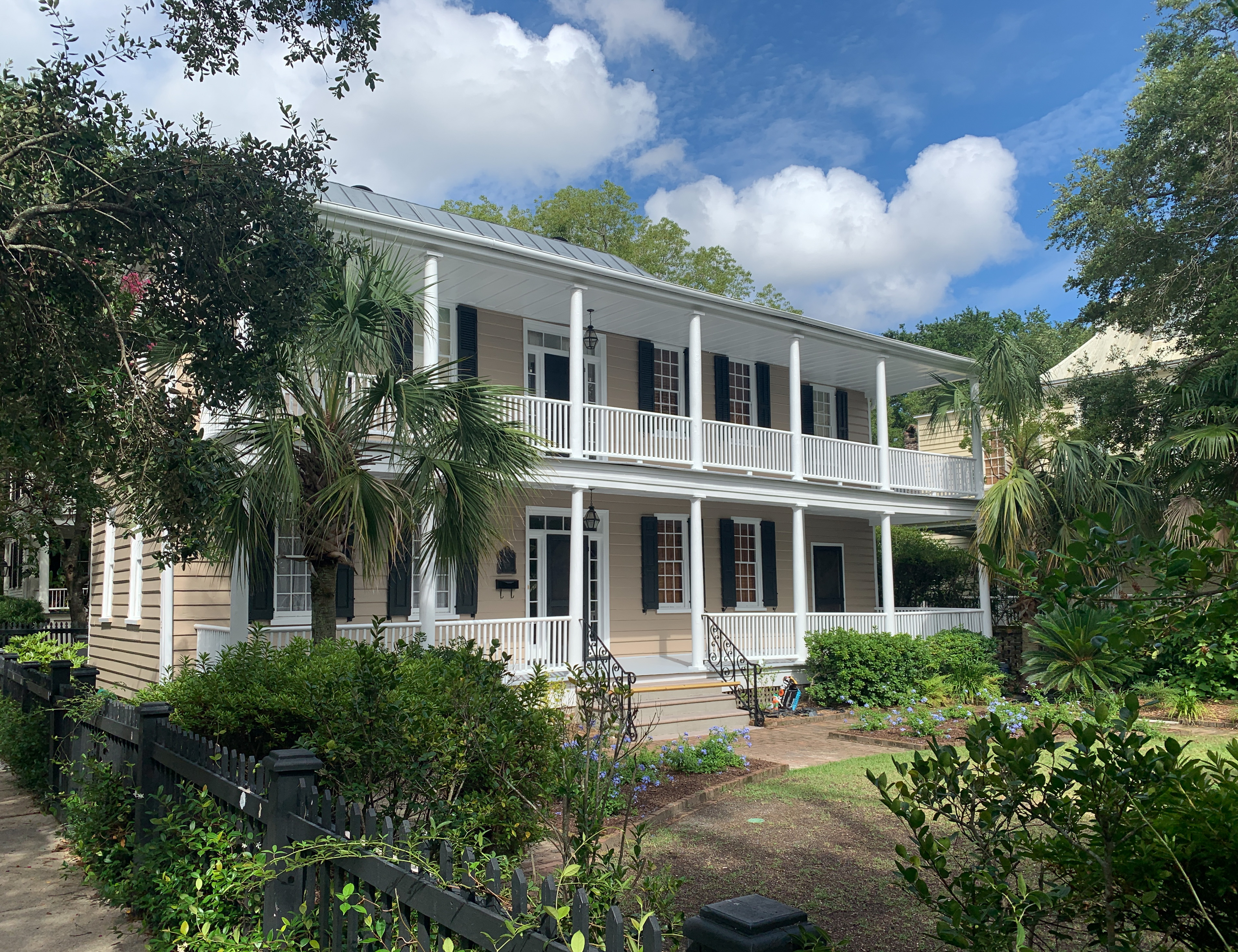
61 Laurens St. was moved from 114 Anson St.

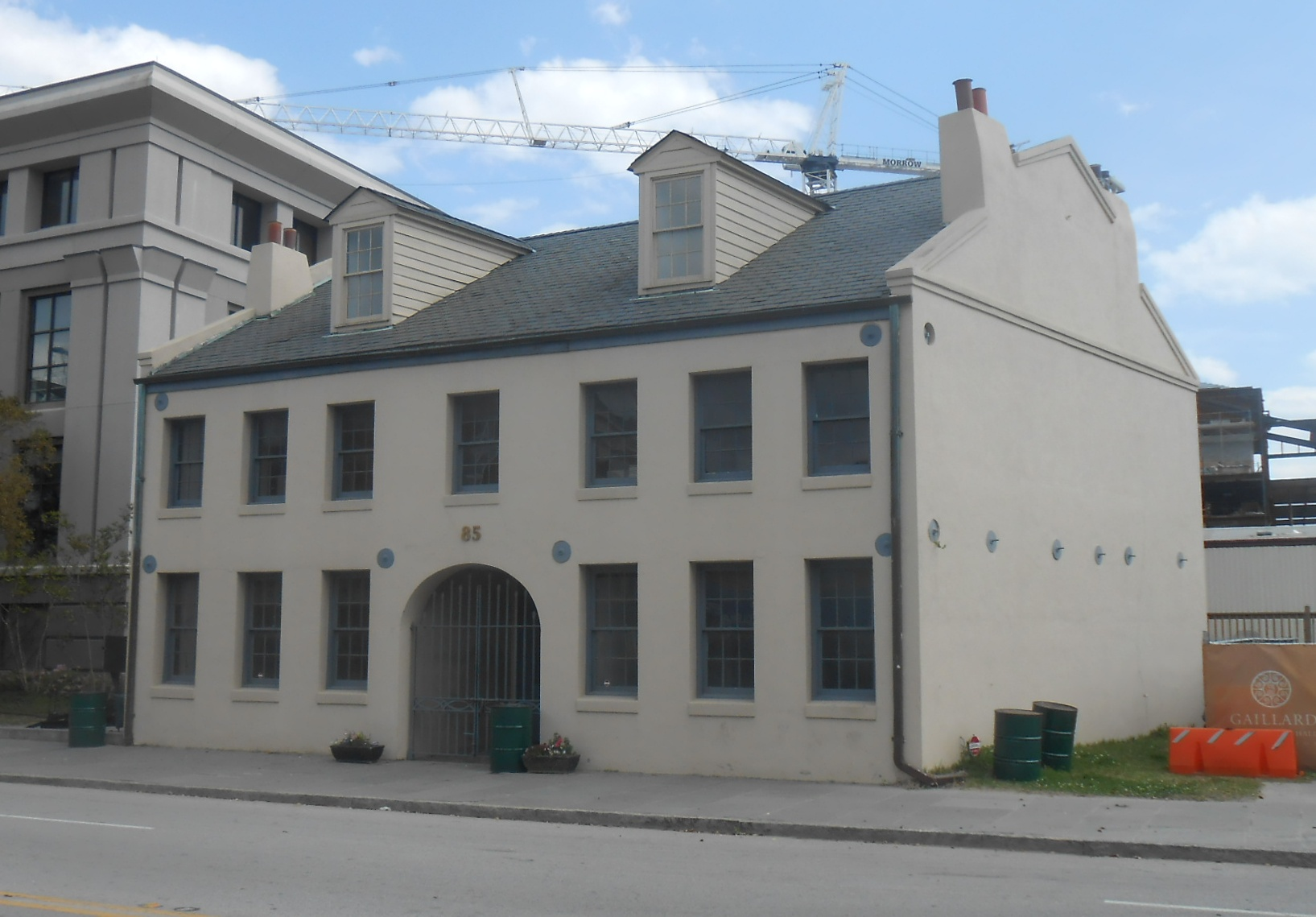
85 Calhoun] St. was restored in place.

== See also ==
- Anson Street African Burial Ground
