= Gridlink =

American band

- Origin: Hoboken, New Jersey, U.S.
- Genre: Grindcore
- Years active: 2004–2014; 2022–2023
- Label: Hydra Head Records
- Past members: Jon Chang; Takafumi Matsubara; Bryan Fajardo; Mauro Cordoba; Rory Kobzina; Keisuke Okada; Takiya Terada; Dorian Rainwater; Ted Patterson; Steve Procopio
- Website: studio-grey.com/gridlink

Gridlink was an American grindcore band, founded in 2004 in Hoboken, New Jersey.

The band's song "Orphan", from their album also titled Orphan, was played sporadically as an interrogation technique during the questioning of a terror suspect in the episode "Blind Spot", of the Showtime television series Homeland.

== Members ==
Current Members

- Jon Chang – vocals (Discordance Axis, Hayaino Daisuki, No One Knows What the Dead Think)
- Takafumi Matsubara – guitar (Mortalized, Hayaino Daisuki)
- Bryan Fajardo – drums
- Mauro Cordoba – bass
- Rory Kobzina – guitar

== Discography ==
- Amber Grey (2008), Hydra Head Records
- Orphan (2011), Hydra Head Records
- Longhena (2014), Handshake, Inc.
- Coronet Juniper (2023), Willowtip Records
