= Frodus =

American post-hardcore band

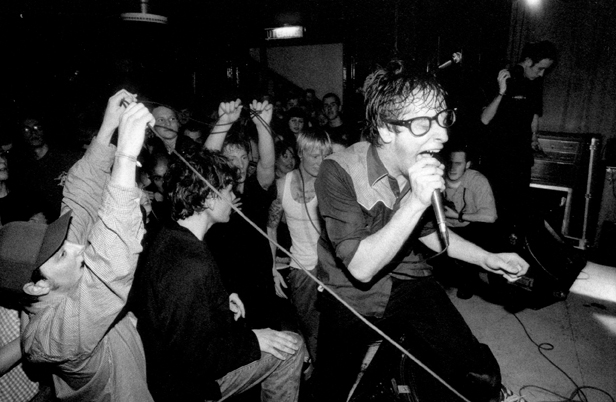
- Frodus performing in Sweden on tour with Refused in 1998

Background information
- Origin: Washington, D.C., US
- Genres: Post-hardcore; post-punk; art rock; math rock
- Years active: 1993–1999, 2009
- Labels: Fueled by Ramen, Tooth & Nail, Double Deuce NYC, Level Records, Gnome Records, Lovitt Records
- Past members: Shelby Cinca; Jason Hamacher; Jake Brown; Nathan Burke; Liam Wilson; Russ Mason; Jim Cooper; Kyle Bacon; Ted Magsig; Dana Wachs; Andy Duncan; Howard Pyle; Saadat Awan
- Website: www.frodus.com

Frodus (a.k.a. Frodus Conglomerate International, Frodus Sound Laboratories, FCI, Frodus Escape Plan, Frodus Deposit Insurance Corporation) was an American post-hardcore band formed in 1993 in Washington, D.C. by vocalist/guitarist Shelby Cinca and drummer Jason Hamacher. The band went through numerous bassists over the course of their career. Their mixture of math rock and hardcore punk plus their lyrical themes, frequently dark and dissonant and seen as esoteric for the time, led them to be described by critics as one of the most influential post-hardcore bands of the 1990s.

== Biography ==
=== Existence (1993–1999) ===
Frodus' first releases were self-distributed cassettes and 7'', such as Babe, Tzo-Boy, and Molotov Cocktail Party. Two other releases (Fireflies and F-Letter), on since-defunct indie labels, followed. The name "Frodus" came from the last episode of TV series The Monkees called "Mijacogeo" (a.k.a. "The Frodis Caper").

Frodus described their sound as "spazz-core", as a joke on Cinca's part, and have also described themselves as a "spastic rock band." Frodus later signed with Tooth & Nail Records, an independent label out of Seattle, with whom they released Conglomerate International in 1998. The band broke up on December of 1999.

Most of Frodus' recognition was due to their final release, And We Washed Our Weapons in the Sea, recorded in 1999 and released in 2001 on Fueled by Ramen, considered by band members to be their best recorded work.

=== Post-breakup (2000–2008) ===
After Frodus broke up in 1999, it took two years to find a label to release their final album. The first label, MIA Records, shut down due to the owner (also a Texas oil-tycoon) having to settle a long-standing lawsuit. Afterwards, long-time Frodus friend Tony Weinbender (then of Fueled by Ramen Records) offered to release Frodus' final album.

Shelby Cinca briefly joined the band Bluebird as a second guitarist following the breakup of Frodus, but left before recording any material with them. In 2000, Nathan went on to form The Out Circuit and Night Is Invisible (both of which released records on Lujo Records), and Hamacher went on to drum for Combatwoundedveteran. In 2003, the founding members Shelby Cinca and Jason Hamacher along with bassist Joe Lally of Fugazi joined to form The Black Sea. They later changed their name to Decahedron. Lally left shortly after the completion of their debut album and was replaced by Jonathan Ford (Unwed Sailor, Roadside Monument). Continually plagued by bassist fluctuation anomalies, Ford quit in 2004 and was later replaced by Jake Brown (formerly of Moments in Grace and Twothirtyeight). In 2005, they suspended operations after the release of their EP entitled 2005. Shelby Cinca then focused on his Swedish project Frantic Mantis with Håkan Johansson and Per Stålberg of Division of Laura Lee, and completed the third album by The Cassettes (Buddyhead Records, 2006). In 2006, Jason Hamacher started a project with Mike Schliebaum of Darkest Hour called Zealot. Cinca began releasing IDM, made on a Game Boy (Game Boy music) with the Nanoloop software, under his own name.

2006 also saw the relaunch of the Frodus web-presence and consolidation of its MySpace entities. The site was an attempt to archive all known interviews, previous website designs, press clippings, and digital transfers for media content. Shelby Cinca also began remastering out-of-print releases and adding them to the iTunes library and other digital music services through his partnership with Carcrash Records.

=== Reunion (2009–2010) ===
Cinca and Hamacher reunited for an impromptu performance at a Division of Laura Lee show at the Swedish embassy in Washington, D.C. in 2008, joined by the Cassettes' Saadat Awan. 2009 saw Frodus reunite as the Frodus Escape Plan/Frodus Conglomerate International/FDIC (Frodus Despotic (or Deposit) Insurance Corporation) with Liam Wilson from The Dillinger Escape Plan on bass, and Jake Brown also on bass for select appearances. The reunion was organized in commemoration of the re-release of the Conglomerate International double-vinyl LP on Gilead Media, and as a statement in response to the bank-bailouts and the uncovering of corporate corruption in the financial sector.

In 2010, Frodus released a new 7″ of material, Soundlab 1, recorded in 2009 with Liam Wilson on bass, released exclusively as a digital download on Bandcamp and as a limited edition 7″ vinyl on Lovitt Records. According to Cinca, the Soundlab series was meant as a series of collaborations with different musicians, which could potentially be its own project outside of Frodus. A statement from the band announced that future collaborations could feature members of such bands as Refused, Darkest Hour, Engine Down, Norma Jean and Converge.

A reissue of the band's final album, And We Washed Our Weapons In the Sea, was released on Lovitt Records in 2015.

== Members ==
Last lineup

- Shelby Cinca – guitar, vocals, electronics, percussion (1993–1998, 2008–2010)
- Jason Hamacher – drums, percussion, backing vocals (1993–1998, 2008–2010)
- Liam Wilson – bass (2008–2010)
- Jake Brown – bass, vocals (2008–2010)

Former members

- Jim Cooper – bass, vocals (1993–1995)
- Kyle Bacon – bass (1993–1994)
- Ted Magsig – bass (1994; four shows)
- Dana Wachs – bass, vocals (1994; four shows)
- Andy Duncan – bass, vocals (1995)
- Howard Pyle – bass, vocals (1995–1997)
- Mason – bass, vocals (1997)
- Nathan Burke – bass, keyboards, vocals (1997–1999)
- Saadat Awan – bass (2008; one show)

Timeline

== Discography ==
Studio Albums

- Molotov Cocktail Party (1994, Gnome / 2006, Carcrash Records iTunes)
- Fireflies (1995, Level / 2006 Carcrash Records iTunes)
- F-Letter (1996, Double Deuce / 2003, Magic Bullet Records)
- Conglomerate International (1998, Tooth and Nail / 2009 Lovitt Records)
- And We Washed Our Weapons in the Sea (2001, Fueled by Ramen)

Live Albums

- 22-D10 (live at WMUC Radio + Formula 7″ Sessions) (1997, No Looking Back)
- Radio-Activity (live radio recordings at WMUC, WHFS, KXLU) (2002, Magic Bullet Records)
- Live at Black Cat 1999 iTunes-only (2005, Lovitt Records)
- Left for Dead in Halmstad! (live in Sweden, April 14, 1998) iTunes-only (2006, Carcrash Records)

Singles and EPs

- Babe (1993, Gnome)
- Tzo Boy (1993, Gnome)
- Treasure Chest (1994, Gnome / Level)
- Formula (1996, Lovitt / Shute)
- Split with Trans-Megetti (1996, Art Monk Construction)
- Explosions (1997, Day After Records)
- Split with Roadside Monument (1997, Tooth and Nail)
- Muddle Magazine Promo Flexi (1997, Tooth and Nail / Muddle)
- Split with Atomic Fireball (1999, Lovitt / Japan: Flatree Records)
- "Suspicion Breeds Confidence (Jason Vocals)" b/w "G. Gordon Liddy Show Call" (2006, Carcrash Records iTunes Only)
- Soundlab 1 (2010, Lovitt Records)

Compilation Appearances

- Squirrel (1995, Level) – "22-d10"
- The Art of Rocketry (1995, Supernova) – "Malcontent" (alt. mix)
- It Goes Without Saying (1999, Sign Language) – "Dec. 21, 2012"
- Give Me the Cure (1995, Radiopaque) – "Killing an Arab"
- The Lovitt Empire (1996, Lovitt) – "Cha-Chi" (English version)
- The Tie That Binds (1996, Nevermore) – "Factory 6" (Formula 7″ Sessions Take)
- Tooth and Nail 4th Anniversary Box Set (1997, Tooth and Nail) – "Lights On for Safety"
- Songs from the Penalty Box 2 (1998, Tooth and Nail) – "Conditioned"
- Songs from the Penalty Box 3 (1999, Tooth and Nail) – "There Will Be No More Scum" (demo)
- Can't Stop This Train (1999, Team Player) – "Extinguished"
- Absolut... (1999, B-Core) – "There Will Be No More Scum" (demo)
- Torch Benefit (2001, Under Radar) – "Suspicion Breeds Confidence (Jason Vocal Take)"
