= Amacher =

Amacher is a surname of German origin. Notable people with the surname include:

- Maryanne Amacher (1938–2009), American composer and installation artist
- Ryan C. Amacher (1945–2016), American economics professor, dean, and university president
