= Combatwoundedveteran =

American Emoviolence band

- Also known as: CWV
- Origin: Ithaca, New York/Tampa, Florida
- Genres: Screamo; powerviolence; grindcore
- Years active: 1996–2003
- Labels: Prank Records, No Idea Records, Burrito Records
- Past members: Dan Ponch; Jason Hamacher; Jeff Howe; Chris Norris; Dan Radde; Billy Frank
- Website: CWV on Facebook

Combatwoundedveteran (also written as Combat Wounded Veteran) was a grindcore/screamo band with members split between Ithaca, New York and Tampa, Florida. In their 7 years of existence they managed to put out several splits, including one with heavily influential screamo band Orchid, a 10" EP, one full-length album and a posthumous release that compiles nearly all their splits and early EPs. Though the band did not tour very often or put out many records their footprint is still visible in the screamo and powerviolence underground. The band was signed to famous Florida record label No Idea Records late in their career. Guitarist Chris Norris currently does graphic design under the name Steak Mtn. and has contributed artwork for releases by groups such as Atom And His Package, Orchid and Against Me!.

The group's music was heavily influenced by the early grindcore sound, screamo and powerviolence.

== Members ==
- Dan Ponch – vocals, bass (1996-2002)
- Jason Hamacher – drums (2000-2002)
- Jeff Howe – bass (1996-2002)
- Chris Norris – guitar, vocals (1996-2002)
- Dan Radde – guitar, vocals (1999-2002)
- Mark Muenchinger - drums (1996-2000)
- Billy Frank – guitar (1999-2000)

== Discography ==
=== Studio albums ===
- I Know a Girl Who Develops Crime Scene Photos (1999, No Idea)

=== EPs ===
- 11 Song 7" (1997, Suppose I Break Your Neck Records)
- What Flavor Is Your Death Squad Leader? (1998, Schematics Records)
- Split 6" (1999, Clean Plate Records; Split w/ Orchid)
- Combatwoundedveteran/Scrotum Grinder (1999, Burrito Records; Split w/ Scrotum Grinder)
- Electric Youth Crew (2002, Schematics Records; Split w/ Reversal of Man)
- Duck Down for the Torso (2002, No Idea Records)
- Demo (2024, Dark Operative Records)

=== Compilation albums ===
- This Is Not an Erect, All-Red Neon Body (2004, No Idea)
