= The Cassettes =

American band

- Origin: Washington, D.C.
- Genres: Steampunk, Indie rock
- Years active: 1999–present
- Labels: Buddyhead Records, Rogue Records (Australia), Chapeau Records
- Members: Shelby Cinca; Saadat Awan; Stephen Guidry; Arthur Harrison

The Cassettes (also known as The Cassettes Musical Explorers Society) are a Washington, D.C.–based "Mystic Country"/Steampunk band formed in 1999.

== History ==
The Cassettes were originally formed as an outgrowth of front-man Shelby Cinca’s four-track recordings: odd pop nuggets that diverged from the teeth-gritting angst of his previous project, Frodus. The son of Romanian refugees who fled from the Iron Curtain in search of the America of Jazz Era music and films, Cinca was indelibly influenced by both his pianist father, who played in clubs off the coast of the Black Sea in the 1960s, and his mother, an author, film critic and Elvis fan. The songs of the Cassettes undoubtedly reflect this heritage and themselves had served as a sort of sonic refuge from the hectic touring schedule of the punk rock lifestyle. The band members have described the band's sound as "steampunk", and also as "synth-infused country stomp".

As originally formed, the troupe consisted of members of Dead Meadow (Steve Killie, Stephen McCarty) and Weird War, and remained together long enough to produce two albums which pulled from classic rock n' roll influences of such bands as Badfinger, Wings, Big Star, and T. Rex. The albums were released both in the United States and abroad. However, this initial group of collaborators members were unexpectedly called onto other travels and they parted ways with good wishes upon the eve of their debut album's release. In the months after the release of the eponymous first album and just before the release of the already completed second album, The Cassettes' line-up began to evolve.

In late 2002, Shelby contacted D.C.-area musician Saadat Awan, who had years before pledged his percussion skills to the band, should he ever be needed. Having spent periods of his childhood with his parents in Pakistan, Awan had begun delving into the art of tabla, a percussion instrument used for centuries in the music of the South Asian subcontinent. He was quickly put to work learning the drum lines from the earlier music and before long had augmented the band's sound with his own vocals and tabla playing. At this time Shelby made a decision to steer the future of the band's sound towards a more experimental sound influenced by The Beatles' White Album. In an attempt to approach things differently he switched to playing a Resonator Guitar and focused on fingerpicking to compensate for lack of bass guitar and to augment Saadat's unique rhythmic stylings. The band's 2006 album was described by Allmusic writer Margaret Reges as "a rollicking air-balloon ride over a landscape dotted with greasy resonator guitars, screaming accordions, and trippy theremins".

Having moved to Washington D.C. from the depths of Louisiana sometime in 1998, close friend and kindred soul Stephen Guidry was recruited to record on some demo songs being produced in the Norwegian Cabin (a studio locale in Arlington, Virginia). His journey away from the swampy flatlands had originally been for the sake of university scholarship, but it was the music that kept him in the District (though his mind often wandered back to his family farm at Pointe Blue). Within a few months, he had joined the band as an official member on analogue synthesizer and Cajun-style accordion. The trio toured in Europe in support of O'er the Mountain in 2003.

In the meantime, however, even before their trip to Europe, at their second show in the states as a trio, there had been a moment of prescience as an indirect result of Stephen having forgotten his power supply somewhere in Virginia. Arthur Harrison (who also played with Stephen in the DC based cabaret troupe, The Parlor Scouts) was in the vicinity of the show and happened to have one of his theremins in his car, was recruited on the spot to fill in for Stephen's missing keyboard sounds. Although his exact history is shrouded in mystery, Harrison had been making electronic music in the DC area since at least the 1980s and had spent years perfecting his oscillators and theremins. He was performing with just these instruments at a planetarium when he was met by Stephen and later, Shelby. As proved by his impromptu performance, the affinity between the group was unmistakable and Arthur would end up officially joining the band at the end of 2003.

The Cassettes continued to hone their sound, diligently recording new material, refining previously recorded works, and consistently playing on the eastern seaboard of the United States. In 2006 they signed to Buddyhead Records after completion of their 3-years in making the album entitled "'Neath The Pale Moon" which brought long-time Frodus producer Jonathan Kreinik (Conglomerate International) back into the fold to refine The Cassettes' synth-infused country stomp.

In 2008, after earlier albums had been released only on CD, the band released their first cassette, Countach, packaged with a toy car and horse. Cinca said of the release: "The artwork and even the music I would say is inspired by connecting to our 'inner children' to kind of make the album we would have wanted to make when we were 12."

2010 saw the release of a rarities album entitled "Writing Analog Letters" on the band's own label Chapeau Records as well as the purchase of their "'Neath The Pale Moon" from their previous label Buddyhead. An updated re-release of said album appeared on the band's Bandcamp page and the band began playing again in 2011 as well as announced plans to record a new album at Guidry's family farm in November 2011. In April 2011, the band released a 7-inch EP and digital download entitled "I've Been Gone Far Too Long..." on Flannel Gurl Records.

== Members ==
Photo illustrating band instrumentation

- Shelby Cinca – electric guitar, resonator guitar, vocals, bass, keyboard
- Saadat Awan – drums, tabla, vocals
- Stephen Guidry – Moog synthesizer, piano, accordion, Jew's harp, vocals
- Nick Kraly – bass guitar, vocals

Previous members:

- Arthur Harrison – theremin, vocals
- Jason Hutto – guitar, vocals
- Steve Kille – bass, vocals
- Stephen McCarty – drums, vocals
- Jennifer Potter – guitar, vocals
- Thomas Bernath – bass

== Discography ==
=== Full Lengths ===
- "Neath The Pale Moon" CD/Compact Cassette/MP3 (2006 Buddyhead Records, 2008 Rogue Records, 2010, 2011 Chapeau)
- "Writing Analog Letters (A Collection)" MP3 (2010 Chapeau) Self-released
- "Countach" Compact Cassette/MP3 (2008, 2011 Chapeau) Self-released
- "Neath The Pale Moon" Double Pack (2008 Rogue Records) Australian Release (EAN 9332727012105)
- "O'er The Mountain" CD (2003 Alice Records, Italy / 2006 iTunes release Buddyhead Records)
- "s/t" CD/LP (2002 Lovitt Records)

=== Singles/EPs ===
- "I've Been Gone Far Too Long..." 7-inch vinyl single/Digital EP (2011 Flannel Gurl Records)
- "Snö" digital-single (2010 Chapeau Records)
- "Countach: The Remixes" digital-EP (2008 Swedish Columbia)
- The Cassettes/Disco Drive split 7-inch vinyl (2003 Bachelor Records, Germany)
- "Lights" 7-inch vinyl single (2000 Carcrash Records, Sweden)
- "Alright With The Days" 7-inch vinyl single (2000 Jetglue Records)

=== Compilations ===
- "Play" Children's Music Compilation (2007 Desoto Records) - Track: "Truck On (Truck)"
- "Wedding Compilation" (2006 Lujo Records) - Track: "Pioneer Love Song"
- "Love And Loathing" (2006 Lujo Records) - Track: "Hey Good Lookin" (originally by Hank Williams Sr.)
- "All I Want For Christmas" (2004 Lujo Records) - Track: "Christmas Wolf"
