= Polar Bear Club discography =

- Studio albums: 4
- Extended plays: 4
- Live albums: 1
- Music videos: 5
- Demos: 1

The following article features the complete discography of the upstate New York based post-hardcore/indie rock band Polar Bear Club.

== Studio albums ==
Year	Information
2008	Sometimes Things Just Disappear: Released: March 11, 2008 (CD), April 7, 2009 (vinyl); Labels: Red Leader Records (CD), Bridge Nine Records (vinyl); Formats: CD, 12" vinyl
2009	Chasing Hamburg: Released: September 8, 2009; Label: Bridge Nine Records; Formats: CD, 12" vinyl
2011	Clash Battle Guilt Pride: Released: September 13, 2011; Label: Bridge Nine Records; Formats: CD, 12" vinyl
2013	Death Chorus: Released: November 19, 2013; Label: Rise Records; Formats: CD, 12" vinyl

== Live albums ==
Year	Information
2012	Live at the Montage: Released: July 31, 2012 (CD); Labels: Bridge Nine Records (CD)

== Extended plays ==
Year	Information
2006	The Redder, the Better: Released: May 21, 2006 (CD), August 25, 2009 (vinyl); Label: Triple Attack Records/Luchador Records (CD), Bridge Nine Records (vinyl); Formats: CD, 12" vinyl
2009	The Summer of George: Released: August 28, 2009; Label: Bridge Nine Records; Formats: 7" vinyl
2010	Drifting Thing (Team Goldie Remix): Released: November 2010; Label: Bridge Nine Records; Formats: 7" vinyl
2011	The View, The Life: Released: August 2011; Label: Bridge Nine Records; Formats: 7" vinyl

== Music videos ==
Year	Song
2009	"Light of Local Eyes"
2010	"Living Saints"
2011	"My Best Days"
2012	"Killin' It"
2012	"Screams in Caves"
2013	"WLWYCD"

== Demos ==
Year	Information
2005	Demo: Released: Summer 2005; Label: None (self released); Formats: CD-R
