= To Live in Discontent =

Compilation album by Strike Anywhere
- Released: January 25, 2005
- Recorded: 2000–2005
- Genre: Punk rock, melodic hardcore, post-hardcore
- Length: 37:31
- Label: Jade Tree

Strike Anywhere chronology
Exit English (2003)	To Live in Discontent (2005)	Dead FM (2006)

Professional ratings
Review scores
Source	Rating
Allmusic	4/5 stars

To Live in Discontent is a compilation album released by Strike Anywhere. It collects various rare, live and unreleased tracks by the band including the entirety of their out of print EP, Chorus of One.

== Track listing ==
No.	Title	Track origins	Length
1.	"Asleep"	Bread or Revolution 7-inch EP on Fat Wreck Chords	2:34
2.	"Antidote"	Bread or Revolution 7-inch EP on Fat Wreck Chords	3:45
3.	"Chorus of One"	Chorus of One EP	2:23
4.	"Question the Answer"	Chorus of One EP	3:42
5.	"Incendiary"	Chorus of One EP	2:25
6.	"Earthbound"	Chorus of One EP	1:09
7.	"Notes On Pulling the Sky Down"	Chorus of One EP	3:49
8.	"Cassandratic Equation"	Chorus of One EP	3:15
9.	"Two Fuses"	Outtake from Exit English sessions	3:18
10.	"Sunspotting"	1999 Demo	2:51
11.	"Two Sides" (live)	Gorilla Biscuits cover performed with New Mexican Disaster Squad in 2004	2:11
12.	"Values Here"	Dag Nasty cover, recorded during Change is a Sound sessions	2:49
13.	"Where Are They Now?"	Cock Sparrer cover, recorded in 2003 for this compilation	3:21
