= I Don't Mind =

I Don't Mind or Don't Mind may refer to:

- "I Don't Mind" (Buzzcocks song)
- "I Don't Mind" (James Brown song)
- "I Don't Mind" (Lindsey Buckingham song)
- "I Don't Mind" (Usher song)
- "Don't Mind" (Kent Jones song)
- "Don't Mind" (Mary J. Blige song)
- "I Don't Mind", by A. J. Croce from Fit to Serve
- "I Don't Mind", by American Steel from Jagged Thoughts
- "I Don't Mind", by Ashanti from Chapter II
- "I Don't Mind", by Ayiesha Woods from Introducing Ayiesha Woods
- "I Don't Mind", by Badfinger from No Dice
- "I Don't Mind", by David Lyttle from Interlude
- "I Don't Mind", by The Decemberists from 5 Songs
- "I Don't Mind", by Detroit Grand Pubahs from Madd Circus
- "I Don't Mind", by Dr. Feelgood from Down by the Jetty
- "I Don't Mind", by Duke Ellington from The Blanton–Webster Band
- "I Don't Mind", by Ethan Johns from Silver Liner
- "I Don't Mind", by Fat Mattress from their self-titled debut album
- "I Don't Mind", by Girl's Day from Expectation
- "I Don't Mind", by Gotthard from Need to Believe
- "I Don't Mind", by Gun from 0141 632 6326
- "I Don't Mind", by Hoodoo Gurus from Kinky
- "I Don't Mind", by Imagine Dragons from Hell and Silence EP
- "I Don't Mind", by Immature & Mix
- "I Don't Mind", by Jason Falkner from I'm OK, You're OK
- "I Don't Mind", by Jimmy Harnen from Can't Fight the Midnight
- "I Don't Mind", by K-Ci and JoJo from Emotional
- "I Don't Mind", by Ken Block from Drift
- "I Don't Mind", by The Kooks from the single "Ooh La"
- "I Don't Mind", by Kubb from Mother
- "I Don't Mind", by Lloyd from Street Love
- "I Don't Mind", by Meg Baird from Don't Weigh Down the Light
- "I Don't Mind", by The Pierces from Light of the Moon
- "I Don't Mind", by Rabbit, also covered by Eric Burdon from Soul of a Man
- "I Don't Mind", by Royal Bliss from Life In-Between
- "I Don't Mind", by Sista from 4 All the Sistas Around da World
- "I Don't Mind", by Slade from Slayed?
- "I Don't Mind", by Stephanie Nakasian from I Love You
- "I Don't Mind", by Terry Ellis from Southern Gal
- "I Don't Mind", by Timothy B. Schmit from Expando
- "I Don't Mind", by Tom Goss featuring Max Emerson
- "I Don't Mind", by Ty Tabor from Safety
- "I Don't Mind", by Waylon Jennings from Folk-Country
- ”I Don’t Mind”, by Zayn from Icarus Falls
- "Don't Mind", a song by Romanian singer Inna from her fifth studio album Nirvana (2017).
