= Fat Club =

Series of limited edition 7-inch singles

The Fat Club is a series of twelve 7-inch singles released monthly by Fat Wreck Chords from March 2001 to February 2002. 1,300 of each single were pressed; They were not available for sale individually, but were distributed by postal service to those who purchased a subscription to the series.

The series featured bands who had not previously been associated with the label: Of the 12 bands who participated, only three—NOFX, Swingin' Utters, and Strung Out—were already part of the Fat Wreck Chords roster. Three of the participating bands had other one-off releases with Fat following their participation in the Fat Club: MxPx's The Renaissance EP (2001), Randy's Randy the Band (2005), and Strike Anywhere's Dead FM (2006). Three of the bands—The Lawrence Arms, The Real McKenzies, and American Steel—became long-term additions to Fat Wreck Chords' roster, releasing multiple albums through the label in the years following. Only The Vandals, Enemy You, and One Man Army have had no further releases through Fat Wreck Chords.

Though the singles were limited, several of the bands re-released their tracks on compilation albums in the years following, including NOFX's 45 or 46 Songs That Weren't Good Enough to Go on Our Other Records (2002), Strike Anywhere's To Live in Discontent (2005), The Lawrence Arms' Cocktails & Dreams (2005), Swingin' Utters' Hatest Grits: B-Sides and Bullshit (2008), and Strung Out's Prototypes and Painkillers (2009). All of the tracks from the series were re-released as part of the Fat Wreck Chords twentieth anniversary compilation Wrecktrospective in 2009.

== Summary of releases ==
Catalog	Band	Release date
FAT205	The Vandals	April 2001
FAT202	American Steel	April 2001
FAT201	The Real McKenzies	May 2001
FAT208	MxPx	June 2001
FAT203	Strike Anywhere	July 2001
FAT204	Randy	August 2001
FAT209	NOFX	September 2001
FAT207	Swingin' Utters	October 2001
FAT210	Strung Out	November 2001
FAT206	Enemy You	December 2001
FAT211	The Lawrence Arms	January 2002
FAT212	One Man Army	February 2002

== Track listings and personnel ==
=== The Vandals ===
Side A
No.	Title	Writer(s)	Length
1.	"Underground"	Dave Quackenbush	3:39

Side B
No.	Title	Writer(s)	Length
1.	"Why Are You Alive?"	Warren Fitzgerald	2:34
Total length:			6:13

- Joe Escalante – bass guitar, backing vocals
- Warren Fitzgerald – guitar, backing vocals
- Josh Freese – drums
- Dave Quackenbush – lead vocals

=== American Steel ===
All tracks are written by Scott Healy, Rory Henderson, Ryan Massey, and John Peck.

Side A
No.	Title	Length
1.	"Middle of the Night"	4:00

Side B
No.	Title	Length
1.	"New Religion Everyday"	3:17
Total length:		7:17

- Scott Healy – drums
- Rory Henderson – lead vocals, guitar
- Ryan Massey – guitar, backing vocals
- John Peck – bass guitar, backing vocals

=== The Real McKenzies ===
Side A
No.	Title	Writer(s)	Length
1.	"Another Round"	Mark Boland, Gwomper, Paul McKenzie, Kurt Robertson, Sean Sellers, and Gord Taylor	2:39

Side B
No.	Title	Writer(s)	Length
1.	"Loch Lomond"	traditional	3:20
Total length:			5:59

- Mark Boland – guitar, backing vocals
- Gwomper – bass guitar
- Paul McKenzie – lead vocals
- Kurt Robertson – guitar, backing vocals
- Sean Sellers – drums
- Gord Taylor – Great Highland Bagpipe

=== MxPx ===
All tracks are written by Mike Herrera.

Side A
No.	Title	Length
1.	"The Road Less Traveled"	3:01

Side B
No.	Title	Length
1.	"You Hold the Key"	2:49
Total length:		5:50

- Mike Herrera – lead vocals, bass guitar
- Yuri Ruley – drums
- Tom Wisniewski – guitar
- Stephen Egerton – backing vocals on "You Hold the Key"
- Jerry Finn – producer, recording engineer, mix engineer

=== Strike Anywhere ===
All tracks are written by Thomas Barnett, Eric Kane, Garth Petrie, Matt Sherwood, and Matt Smith.

Side A
No.	Title	Length
1.	"Antidote"	3:45

Side B
No.	Title	Length
1.	"Asleep"	2:33
Total length:		6:18

- Thomas Barnett – lead vocals
- Eric Kane – drums
- Garth Petrie – bass guitar
- Matt Sherwood – guitar, backing vocals
- Matt Smith – guitar, backing vocals

=== Randy ===
All tracks are written by Johan Brändström, Fredrik Granberg, Stefan Granberg, and Johan Gustafsson.

Side A
No.	Title	Length
1.	"I'm Stepping Out"	3:07

Side B
No.	Title	Length
1.	"Unite"	2:26
2.	"Freedom Song"	3:15
Total length:		8:48

- Johan Brändström – guitar, backing vocals
- Fredrik Granberg – drums
- Stefan Granberg – lead vocals, guitar
- Johan Gustafsson – bass guitar, backing vocals

=== NOFX ===
Side A
No.	Title	Writer(s)	Length
1.	"Zyclone B Bath House"	Fat Mike	1:40

Side B
No.	Title	Writer(s)	Length
1.	"Spaghetti Motel"	Fat Mike, Bill Bartell	1:58
Total length:			3:38

- El Hefe – lead guitar, backing vocals
- Fat Mike – lead vocals, bass guitar
- Eric Melvin – rhythm guitar, backing vocals
- Erik Sandin – drums

=== Swingin' Utters ===
All tracks are written by Darius Koski.

Side A
No.	Title	Length
1.	"Black Mountain Rain"	1:44

Side B
No.	Title	Length
1.	"Outside Life"	2:00
Total length:		3:44

=== Strung Out ===
All tracks are written by Chris Aiken, Jordan Burns, Jason Cruz, Jake Kiley, and Rob Ramos.

Side A
No.	Title	Length
1.	"Dig"	2:54

Side B
No.	Title	Length
1.	"Lost Motel"	3:59
Total length:		6:53

- Chris Aiken – bass guitar
- Jordan Burns – drums
- Jason Cruz – lead vocals
- Jake Kiley – guitar
- Rob Ramos – guitar

=== Enemy You ===
All tracks are written by David Jones.

Side A
No.	Title	Length
1.	"The Promise Breakers"	1:07

Side B
No.	Title	Length
1.	"Kind Hearts"	2:28
2.	"Emma"	2:38
Total length:		6:13

- David Jones – lead vocals, guitar
- Chris Matulich – bass guitar
- Joe Yamazaki – drums
- Ken Yamazaki – guitar

=== The Lawrence Arms ===
All tracks are written by Brendan Kelly, Neil Hennessy, and Chris McCaughan.

Side A
No.	Title	Length
1.	"Porno and Snuff Films"	2:34

Side B
No.	Title	Length
1.	"A Toast"	2:33
2.	"Overheated"	4:18
Total length:		9:25

- Neil Hennessy – drums
- Brendan Kelly – bass guitar, lead and backing vocals
- Chris McCaughan – guitar, lead and backing vocals

=== One Man Army ===
All tracks are written by One Man Army.

Side A
No.	Title	Length
1.	"Victoria"	2:32

Side B
No.	Title	Length
1.	"She Wants Me Dead"	2:04
Total length:		4:36
