= Iron Front (album) =

Studio album by Strike Anywhere
- Released: October 6, 2009
- Recorded: May–June 2009
- Genre: Melodic hardcore, hardcore punk
- Length: 31:35
- Label: Bridge 9

Strike Anywhere chronology
Dead FM (2006)	Iron Front (2009)

Professional ratings
Review scores
Source	Rating
AllMusic	3/5 stars
Punknews	4.5/5 stars

Iron Front is the fourth studio album by American punk rock band Strike Anywhere. The album was released worldwide on October 6, 2009.

== Background ==
On May 20, 2009, Punknews.org reported that the band had signed to Bridge 9 Records. Founder Chris Wrenn had been a long-term fan of the band since their debut EP. Barnett said the label had a "cool combination of hardcore roots and culture, a love for the life and message", which was what caught their attention of the label. The following week, the band started recorded their next album at Salad Days Studios with producer Brian McTernan. The process wrapped up in June 2009.

== Release ==
In June 2009, the band toured Canada and the US Midwest with Propagandhi. On July 3, 2009, Iron Front was announced for release in three months' time. Alongside this, "Hand of Glory" was posted on the band's Myspace profile. On July 29, 2009, the album's artwork and track listing were posted online. They later appeared at the Resurrection Festival in Spain in August 2009. On September 21, 2009, "I'm Your Opposite Number" was posted on Myspace. Following this, they went on a US tour in October and November 2009, with Crime in Stereo, Polar Bear Club and Ruiner. During this, they performed at The Fest. They closed out the year with a UK tour with Propagandhi and a European tour alongside Dead to Me. In January and February 2010, the band supported Four Year Strong on their headlining US tour and then appeared at Harvest of Hope Fest. During this trek, a music video was released for "I'm Your Opposite Number"; it was directed by Justin Staggs and was filmed several months earlier in Minneapolis, Minnesota. They performed the song for a BBC Radio 1 session shortly afterwards. In April 2010, the band appeared at the Groezrock festival in Belgium and then embarked on a European tour with Pennywise and A Wilhelm Scream. Following a few West Coast and Midwest US shows with Lowtalker, the band went on a Canadian tour with Bane, Touché Amoré and Lowtalker throughout June 2010. In July 2010, they toured Australia and New Zealand with Paper Arms, and then performed at the Reading and Leeds Festivals in the UK.

== Track listing ==
1. "Invisible Colony" – 1:22
2. "I'm Your Opposite Number" – 2:20
3. "South Central Beach Party" – 2:28
4. "Failed State" – 2:31
5. "Hand of Glory" – 1:43
6. "The Crossing" – 2:54
7. "Spectacular" – 1:50
8. "Blackbirds Roar" – 2:19
9. "Omega Footprint" – 2:12
10. "Summerpunks" – 2:09
11. "First Will and Testament" – 2:53
12. "Western Scale" – 3:18
13. "Postcards From Home" – 2:58

== Personnel ==
=== Band ===
- Thomas Barnett - Vocals
- Matt Smith - Guitar, Vocals
- Garth Petrie - Bass
- Eric Kane - Drums
- Mark Miller - Guitar, Vocals
