= Funk All Y'all =

Studio album by Detroit Grand Pubahs
- Released: August 7, 2001
- Genre: Electro, hip hop, Detroit techno, electroclash
- Label: Intuit-Solar

Detroit Grand Pubahs chronology
Funk All Y'all (2001)	Galactic Ass Creatures From Uranus (2004)

Singles from Funk All Y'all
- 1. "Sandwiches" Released: June 1, 2000

Funk All Y'all is the debut album by American electro band Detroit Grand Pubahs, released in August 2001 by record label Intuit-Solar and featuring the successful single "Sandwiches".

== Release ==
"Sandwiches" was released as a single on June 1, 2000, prior to the album's release. The song became a Top 40 hit in the United Kingdom, peaking at number 29 on the UK Singles Chart. The song became a moderate dance hit, peaking at number 29 on the US Billboard Hot Dance Club Songs.

Funk All Y'all was released on August 7, 2001, by record label Intuit-Solar.

== Reception ==
Professional ratings
Review scores
Source	Rating
AllMusic	3/5 stars
Chart	4.5/5 stars
Village Voice	mixed

John Bush of AllMusic wrote: "Andy Toth and Paris the Black Fu proved themselves masters of the production game long ago, and though the music is often relegated to second-division status amidst all the role-playing, Funk All Y'all is great fun for all those bored by the scads of 'intelligent' techno out there." Kori Golding of Chart wrote: "Funk and techno come together in a lubricated orgy that will make you want to get nekkid and slap some fat ass thighs and floss with a thong". Village Voice's Hobey Echlin was less favourable, writing: "in the words of Spinal Tap, there's a fine line between clever and stupid, and before long, the Pubahs' imagination starts to outpace their minimal techno palette. [...] By the time the Pubahs' pun-happy song titles get better than the actual songs [...] and the vocals gum up otherwise slamming electro throwdowns [...] the Pubahs commit the greatest sin of all: forgetting this is, if not dance music, then at least party music, not a comedy album with a Groovebox."

== Track listing ==
No.	Title	Writer(s)	Length
1.	"Intro – Lost Files of Funk"	Mack Goudy Jr., Andy Toth	0:32
2.	"Funk All Y'all"	Mack Goudy Jr.	6:36
3.	"One Hump or Two"	Mack Goudy Jr., Andy Toth	3:43
4.	"Sandwiches"	Mack Goudy Jr., Andy Toth	3:02
5.	"After School Special" (featuring Miss Kittin)	Mack Goudy Jr., Caroline Hervé, Andy Toth	4:59
6.	"Real Life (Evil D Skit)"	Mack Goudy Jr., Andy Toth	1:07
7.	"Ride"	Mack Goudy Jr., Andy Toth, John Williams	3:11
8.	"Plasticine Gene"	Mack Goudy Jr., Andy Toth, John Williams	5:13
9.	"Involvement Fluid"	Mack Goudy Jr., Andy Toth	6:31
10.	"Off Beat Killer"	Mack Goudy Jr.	3:53
11.	"Artificial Intelligence"	Mack Goudy Jr., Andy Toth	3:14
12.	"Schizophrenic Investigator"	Mack Goudy Jr.	3:02
13.	"The Suture the Future"	Mack Goudy Jr.	4:34
14.	"Dr. Bootygrabber"	Mack Goudy Jr., Andy Toth	6:56
15.	"Rain"	Mack Goudy Jr., Andy Toth	7:08
