= Sometimes Things Just Disappear =

Studio album by Polar Bear Club
- Released: March 11, 2008
- Recorded: July 2007
- Studio: Nada Studios
- Genres: Post-hardcore, indie rock, pop punk, melodic hardcore, emo
- Length: 39:29
- Label: Red Leader
- Producer: John Naclerio

Polar Bear Club chronology
| The Redder, the Better (2006) | Sometimes Things Just Disappear (2008) | The Summer of George (2009) |

Sometimes Things Just Disappear is the debut studio album by American rock band Polar Bear Club. It is the follow-up to their critically acclaimed EP, The Redder, the Better, and received mostly favorable reviews.

== Production ==
Sometimes Things Just Disappear was recorded at Nada Studios in July 2007, with producer John Naclerio, who also served as engineer, and mastered the album.

== Release ==
In July 2007, Polar Bear Club signed to Red Leader Records. On August 2, 2007, "Our Ballads" was made available for streaming through the band's Myspace profile, followed by "Burned Out in a Jar" later that month. On December 14, 2007, Sometimes Things Just Disappear was announced for release in three months' time; alongside this, "Another Night in the Rock" was posted on Myspace. Sometimes Things Just Disappear was released on March 11, 2008 through Red Leader Records. In August and September, the band went on tour with the Gaslight Anthem and American Steel. In between dates on this tour, the band performed shows in Canada with the Swellers. In October 2008, the band went on a tour of the US with Crime in Stereo and Broadway Calls. They then appeared at The Fest in Florida. In December, the band went on a brief tour with Fireworks, Forfeit and the Swellers in the US, followed by a few shows in Canada with Cancer Bats and the Holly Springs Disaster. In February and March 2009, the band went on a tour of Europe alongside the Gaslight Anthem. Also in March, the band went a headlining UK tour, followed by a brief tour with Have Heart and Trapped Under Ice.

== Reception ==
Professional ratings
Review scores
| Source | Rating |
|---|---|
| Alternative Press | 4.5/5 stars |
| Rock Sound | (7/10) |
| Sputnikmusic | (4/5) |

Punknews.org ranked the album at number six on their list of the year's 20 best releases.

== Track listing ==
All songs by Polar Bear Club, all lyrics by Jimmy Stadt, except some in "As 'Twere the Mirror" adapted from quote by Vinnie Paul.

| No. | Title | Length |
|---|---|---|
| 1. | "Eat Dinner, Bury the Dog, and Run" | 4:22 |
| 2. | "Hollow Place" | 4:12 |
| 3. | "Bug Parade" | 4:01 |
| 4. | "Another Night in the Rock" | 3:48 |
| 5. | "Burned Out in a Jar" | 3:17 |
| 6. | "As 'Twere the Mirror" | 3:59 |
| 7. | "Tried" | 3:20 |
| 8. | "Our Ballads" | 3:32 |
| 9. | "Heart Attack at Thirty" | 3:27 |
| 10. | "Convinced I'm Wrong" | 5:31 |
| Total length: | | 39:29 |

== Release history ==
| Region | Date | Label | Format | Catalog # |
|---|---|---|---|---|
| United States; Canada | March 11, 2008 | Red Leader Records | CD | RLR15 |
| United States; Canada | April 7, 2009 | Bridge Nine Records | LP | 202101 |

== Personnel ==
Personnel per booklet.

Polar Bear Club

- Jimmy Stadt – vocals
- Chris Browne – guitars
- Greg Odom – bass
- Nate Morris – guitars
- Emmett Menke – drums

Additional musicians

- Jasmyn Belcher – cello (track 10)

Production

- John Naclerio – producer, engineer, mastering
- Richard Minino – illustrations
