= Gustave Brickner =

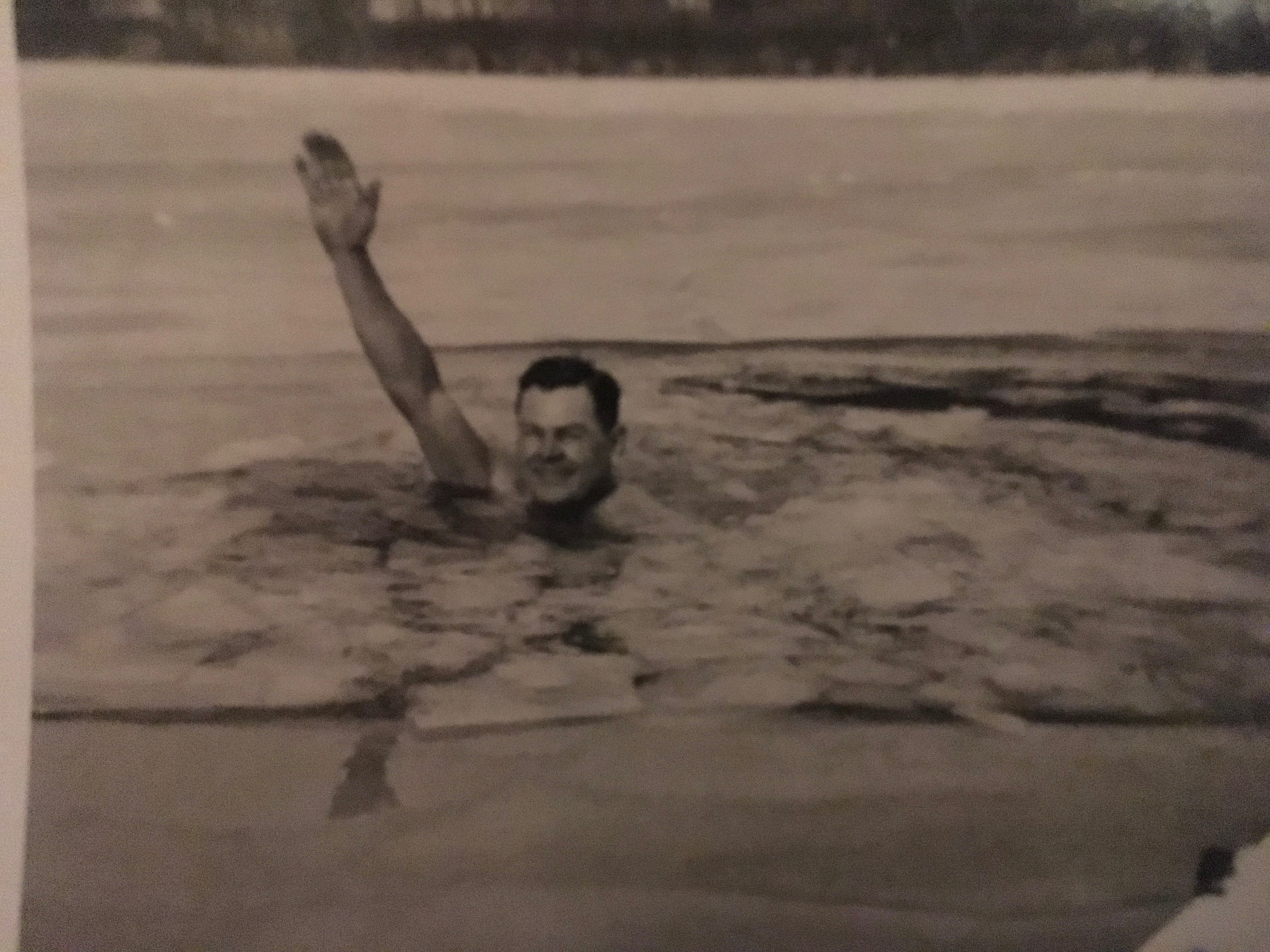
Gus Brickner grateful to boat breaking ice for his swim

Gustave Adolph "Gus" Brickner was a famous swimmer hailing from Charleroi, Pennsylvania in the United States. Born Feb. 10, 1912 to Gustave Adolph Brickner Sr. (1889–1918) and Philamena "Minnie" Buchrop (1885–1968). One of Five siblings, Gus's father died at age 29 when Gus was 6 years old. Minnie later married Samuel French.

Gus married Mary Louise Gallagher (1917–2007). They had three children. Gus died December 5, 1991.

He was famous for extreme swimming feats. Living in an era before the internet and instant worldwide media, his name was well known in swimming circles. Many non-competitive swimmers also knew him by his well-earned nickname, "The Human Polar Bear".

== Swimming the English Channel ==
Brickner attempted to swim the English Channel twice. In his era, this was the swimmers' version of Charles Lindbergh's flight to Paris. This had previously been accomplished, but was (and still is) a feat with a low percentage chance of success. The cold water, the tides and currents, the wave size and the sheer time required to complete the swim (often over 24 hours), are monumental. Muscular fatigue, lack of sleep, and hypothermia are among the more serious challenges.

On his first attempt, Brickner almost succeeded. He was 400 yards from the shore when severe cramps required him to be pulled from the water. During this attempt, he was 45 minutes ahead of the world record pace for the swim. On his second failed attempt, he was somewhat further from shore (a few miles) when he had to be retrieved from the water after he passed out and did not immediately revive. Brickner had been in the water well over 24 hours by that point. He was about to attempt a third time after several months of training, but the authorities governing the channel called the event off because of inclement conditions.

== World records ==
Gus Brickner's fame was not merely for his repeated attempts to swim the English Channel; he holds 2 world records for extreme swimming in the Guinness Book of World Records. Both may never be duplicated, but one in particular will definitely not. His official logged swimming distance is truly superhuman: 38,500 miles total (It is perhaps worth noting that the circumference of the entire Earth at the equator is "only" 24,901.55 miles, for comparison purposes). He also holds the world's record for time and low temperature submersion in icy waters: 6 minutes and 22 seconds at a recorded temperature of -18 degrees Fahrenheit. The ice water submersion record was officially pulled and attempts are no longer allowed, as multiple people have died trying to beat his record.

== Other feats ==
Brickner earned his nickname, "The Human Polar Bear," when local residents often saw him swimming in the Monongahela River behind ice-breaking ships in the middle of a cold winter snap the area was known for. The river is well used by commercial barge traffic, and long thick freezes of the river required ice-breakers to be brought in.

Brickner always celebrated the New Year by jumping into the Monongahela River and going for a brief swim. He did this for decades. Eventually, other residents started joining him for a short dip in the icy waters, thereby starting the "Polar Bear Club", a tradition that continues annually to this day. This event is covered by local newspapers and TV stations.

Brickner's normal training regimen involved swimming the Monongahela River daily, year round, taking only Christmas Day off. His daily swims in the river (and other locations, both local and worldwide) varied in length from a few miles to over 20 miles, depending on the day's schedule. He was still doing this well into his 70s.
