= Dear Heart (disambiguation) =

Dear Heart is a 1964 American movie.

Dear Heart may also refer to:

- "Dear Heart" (song), the theme from the movie, sung by Andy Williams
- Andy Williams' Dear Heart, a 1965 album containing the song
- Dear Heart, a 1981 Filipino movie directed by Danny Zialcita starring Gabby Concepcion and Sharon Cuneta
- Dear Heart, a 1980s UK television show with performers including Leni Harper and Toyah Willcox and writers including Victoria Pile

== See also ==
- "Dearheart", a track from the soundtrack of 2011 movie All God's Creatures
- Adora Belle Dearheart, a character in Terry Pratchett's Discworld series
- "Dear Heart! What a Terrible Life I Am Led", a song performed in 1769 by Lewis Hallam Jr.
- "Dear Hearts and Gentle People", a 1949 song
- Dear Friends and Gentle Hearts, a 2009 American Steel album
- Dear Lonely Hearts, a 1962 Nat King Cole album
- Dark Dear Heart, a 1997 Holly Cole album and its title track
- "Good Night, Dear Heart", a Quantum Leap episode
- Rejoice, Dear Hearts!, a 1959 comedy album by Brother Dave Gardner
- So Dear to My Heart, a 1948 Disney film
