= Dead FM =

Studio album by Strike Anywhere
- Released: September 5, 2006
- Recorded: 2006
- Genre: Hardcore punk, melodic hardcore
- Length: 31:10
- Label: Fat Wreck Chords
- Producer: Brian McTernan

Strike Anywhere chronology
To Live in Discontent (2005)	Dead FM (2006)	Iron Front (2009)

Dead FM is the third studio album by Strike Anywhere.

== Background ==
In February and March 2006, the band went on a brief East Coast tour with A Global Threat, With Honor, and Subhumans.

It was recorded April 2006 at Salad Days Studios by Brian McTernan. They finished writing the final song intended for inclusion early in the recording process. It was recorded on a series of weekends over a span of nine months as the band took time off touring to return to home life and move away from a hectic timetable to write and record an album. They held a one-off show partway through recording, where they debuted several new songs.

== Composition ==
It contains songs that focus on the band's leftist political views, as well as branching out to discuss issues such as singer Thomas Barnett's grandfather's work on the Manhattan Project on the opening track 'Sedition'.

== Release ==
On May 4, 2006, Dead FM was announced for release in four months' time. Three days later, Strike Anywhere appeared at The Bamboozle festival. On June 14, 2006, the track listing for the album, as well as "The Promise", was posted online. On July 27, 2006, "Prisoner Echoes" was also posted online, followed by "Instinct" on August 22, 2006. Dead FM was made available for streaming via Alternative Press' website on August 29, 2006, before it was released on September 5, 2006. In between this, a music video for "Instinct" was released; it was filmed in Richmond, Virginia a few months earlier. The album was promoted with a two month-long trek across the US; for the first month, they were supported by Ignite, A Global Threat, and Modern Life Is War, while for the second month, Bane and This Is Hell replaced Ignite and Modern Life Is War, respectively. They closed out the year with an appearance at the CMJ Music Marathon, and a month-long Europe tour with the Loved Ones.

On January 25, 2007, the band appeared on Fuel TV, performing "Hollywood Cemetery" and "Prisoner Echoes" acoustically. In January and February 2007, they supported NOFX on their tour of California; in-between these dates, the band played shows with Dead to Me and Love Equals Death. On March 22, 2007, guitarist Matt Sherwood announced his departure from the band. Strike Anywhere then embarked on a tour of Japan with No Trigger, performed at 228 Festival in Taiwan, and a stint of their own in Australia. Following this, they supported the Bouncing Souls on their headlining Canadian tour in April and May 2007. They then went on a two-week tour with the Loved Ones, and a two-month stint in Europe, some shows of which were with Red Lights Flash.

Strike Anywhere played a few headlining shows with Cloak/Dagger, prior to a US tour with From Autumn to Ashes and Silverstein, and performed at Saints & Sinners Festival. Around this time, drummer Eric Kane spent sometime performing with Four Star Alarm. In March 2008, they went on an East Coast tour with Paint It Black and the Riverboat Gamblers. Following a performance in Brazil, they performed at the Groezrock and Give it a Name festivals. In June 2008, the band embarked on a Canadian tour with the Flatliners, Hostage Life, This Is a Standoff, and Carpenter. Preceded by one show in Portugal, the band went on a tour of the UK, followed by a short tour in Japan. In October 2008, they performed a handful of shows with the Bouncing Souls, the Casting One and Gimme Drugs, leading up to an appearance at The Fest.

== Reception ==
Professional ratings
Review scores
Source	Rating
Allmusic	4/5 stars
Aversion	4/5 stars

Punknews.org ranked the album at number four on their list of the year's 20 best releases.

== Track listing ==
All tracks by Strike Anywhere.

1. "Sedition" - 2:00
2. "How to Pray" - 2:25
3. "Prisoner Echoes" - 2:37
4. "Instinct" - 2:42
5. "The Promise" - 2:06
6. "Speak to Our Empty Pockets" - 2:28
7. "Two Thousand Voices" - 1:55
8. "Hollywood Cemetery" - 1:41
9. "Allies" - 1:45
10. "Gunpowder" - 1:59
11. "Dead Hours" - 2:27
12. "Iron Trees" - 2:05
13. "House Arrest" - 1:55
14. "Ballad of Bloody Run" - 3:00

== Personnel ==
=== Band ===
- Thomas Barnett - Vocals
- Matt Smith - Guitar, Vocals
- Garth Petrie - Bass
- Eric Kane - Drums
- Matt sherwood - Guitar, Vocals

=== Production ===
- Mark Beemer – Photography
- Jana B. Crawford – Photography
- Paul Leavitt – Digital Editing
- George Marino – Mastering
- Brian McTernan – Producer, Engineer, Mixing
- Richard Minino – Artwork, Layout Design
- Shawn Scallen – Photography
- Strike Anywhere – Producer
