= Chorus of One =

EP by Strike Anywhere
- Released: June 30, 2000
- Genre: hardcore punk
- Length: 17 minutes
- Labels: No Idea (vinyl), Red Leader (CD)

Strike Anywhere chronology
Chorus of One (2000)	Change Is a Sound (2001)

Chorus of One is an EP by the punk rock band Strike Anywhere, released in 2000. The entirety of its content has since been made available as part of Strike Anywhere's To Live in Discontent rarities compilation album. The EP's artwork was designed by As Friends Rust vocalist Damien Moyal. The band had toured the United States with As Friends Rust from May 29 to June 30, 2000.

"Question the Answer" is featured on the soundtrack to the skateboarding video game Tony Hawk's American Wasteland.

== Track listing ==
1. "Chorus of One"
2. "Question the Answer"
3. "Incendiary"
4. "Earthbound"
5. "Notes on Pulling the Sky Down"
6. "Cassandratic Equation"

== Limited edition vinyl ==
Limited edition colored vinyl pressings of the EP were released on No Idea Records. Record pressing quantities, colors, and dates are as follows:

1. 1st Pressing: 550 Grey, 550 Dark Red (July 2000)
2. 2nd Pressing: 1,020 Opaque Purple (December 2000)
3. 3rd Pressing: 1,100 Black (February 2003)
