= Chasing Hamburg =

Studio album by Polar Bear Club
- Released: September 8, 2009
- Recorded: April 2009
- Genres: Post-hardcore, indie rock, pop punk, melodic hardcore
- Length: 31:56
- Label: Bridge Nine
- Producer: Matt Bayles

Polar Bear Club chronology
The Summer of George (2008)	Chasing Hamburg (2009)	Clash Battle Guilt Pride (2011)

Professional ratings
Review scores
Source	Rating
AbsolutePunk	84%
AllMusic	3.5/5 stars
Punknews.org	4/5 stars
Rock Sound	8/10

Chasing Hamburg, is the second studio album and fourth official release from the upstate New York-based post-hardcore/indie rock band Polar Bear Club. It is the follow-up to their teaser EP, The Summer of George, and received mostly favourable reviews.

== Background and recording ==
On January 8, 2009, the band announced they had signed to independent label Bridge Nine Records. Drummer Emmett Menke said the group had been in discussions with labels for a while, "and as cliche as it sounds, there isn't a better match out there for us." He said that the band were long-time fans of the label, in addition to "the bands they've worked with. It's rare these days to be a part of a label that doesn't feel the need to rest on its laurels and is not afraid to push the envelope." He mentioned that the band had been writing a new album for two weeks up to that point. Their next album was expected to be released some time in the fall. In mid-January, it was mentioned that the band would be recording in three months' time. In March 2009, they went on a short East Coast tour with Have Heart. On April 6, the band began recording with producer Matt Bayles. Bayles engineered and mixed the album, with assistance from Derek Moree. Ed Brooks mastered the album at RFI.

== Release ==
In early May, the band went on a brief west coast tour with Living with Lions. In late May and early June, the band toured the UK with Ruiner and Defeater. On May 28, 2009, Chasing Hamburg was announced for release in three months' time. Following this, they supported Every Time I Die on a few North American shows. On June 18, 2009, the album's artwork and track listing were posted online. The Summer of George EP was released on July 28, 2009, featuring two songs from the album, "Living Saints" and "Boxes", alongside the exclusive song "Dead Man". In August 2009, the band supported Set Your Goals and Four Year Strong on their co-headlining US tour, which was followed by an appearance at the Reading and Leeds Festivals in the UK. Shortly after this, "One Hit Back" was posted online. It released on September 8, 2009 through Bridge Nine Records. To promote the album, the band played a handful of New York shows and then supported Face to Face on their US East Coast tour. Following this, they went on a US tour in October and November 2009, with Strike Anywhere, Crime in Stereo and Ruiner. The trek included a performance at The Fest.

Following this, Polar Bear Club supported Thrice on their headlining US tour until the end of the year. On November 10, 2009, a music video was released for "Light of Local Eyes". Following an Australian tour in January 2010 with Break Even and the Gifthorse, Polar Bear Club went on a European tour with Shook Ones and Title Fight in February and March 2010. In March and April 2010, the band went on a US tour alongside Four Year Strong, Every Time I Die and Trapped Under Ice, and then appeared at Skatefest and Bled Fest. During this trek, a music video was released for "Living Saints", directed by Thomas Colella. It is a "conceptual piece" akin to the video for "Sledgehammer" (1986) by Peter Gabriel. Following a headlining tour with support from Moving Mountains, Lemuria and Living with Lions, Polar Bear Club performed on Warped Tour through to July 2010.

== Track listing ==
All songs written by Polar Bear Club.

No.	Title	Length
1.	"See the Wind"	2:21
2.	"Living Saints"	2:33
3.	"Boxes"	3:35
4.	"Take Me to the Town"	3:34
5.	"Drifting Thing"	2:28
6.	"Light of Local Eyes"	3:19
7.	"Song to Persona"	3:17
8.	"The Old Fisher Burial Ground"	3:45
9.	"One Hit Back"	2:52
10.	"Chasing Hamburg"	4:12
Total length:		31:56

== Release history ==
Region	Date	Label	Format	Catalog #
United States; Canada	September 8, 2009	Bridge Nine Records	CD	202232
United States; Canada	September 8, 2009	Bridge Nine Records	LP	202231

== Personnel ==
Personnel per booklet.

Polar Bear Club

- Jimmy Stadt – vocals
- Chris Browne – guitar
- Nate Morris – guitar
- Emmett Menke – drums
- Erik Henning – bass

Additional musicians

- Matt Bayles – keyboard (tracks 3, 7 and 10)
- Pat Flynn – yelling (track 1)
- Aaron Scott – vocals (track 7)
- Ty Vaughn – gang vocals (tracks 2, 9 and 10)

Production

- Matt Bayles – producer, engineer, mixing
- Derek Moree – assistant engineer
- Ed Brooks – mastering
- The Black Axe – layout, design
