= The Summer of George (EP) =

EP by Polar Bear Club
- Released: July 28, 2009
- Recorded: April 6–May 4, 2009 at Red Room Recording in Seattle, Washington
- Genre: Post-hardcore, indie rock, pop punk, melodic hardcore
- Length: 8:56
- Label: Bridge Nine
- Producer: Matt Bayles

Polar Bear Club chronology
Sometimes Things Just Disappear (2008)	The Summer of George (2009)	Chasing Hamburg (2009)

The Summer of George, released on July 28, 2009, through Bridge Nine Records, is a teaser EP for the second full-length studio album Chasing Hamburg and third official release from the upstate New York-based post-hardcore/indie rock band Polar Bear Club. It is the follow-up to their debut full-length studio album, Sometimes Things Just Disappear, and received few, but mostly favourable, reviews. The title of the EP is a reference to the 156th episode of the sitcom Seinfeld, "The Summer of George".

== Track listing ==
No.	Title	Length
1.	"Living Saints"	2:33
2.	"Dead Man" (EP exclusive)	2:48
3.	"Boxes"	3:35
Total length:		8:56

== Release history ==
Region	Date	Label	Format	Catalog #
United States	July 28, 2009	Bridge Nine Records	7" vinyl	B9R118
Canada	July 28, 2009	Bridge Nine Records	7" vinyl	B9R118

== Personnel ==
Polar Bear Club

- Jimmy Stadt - vocals
- Chris Browne - guitar, backing vocals
- Nate Morris - guitar
- Erik Michael "Goose" Henning - bass
- Emmett Menke - drums

Studio personnel

- Matt Bayles - production and engineering

== Details ==
- Studio: Red Room Recording in Seattle, Washington
- Distributor: Caroline Distribution
- Recording type: studio
- Recording mode: stereo
- SPARS code: n/a
