= Inquisition (punk band) =

1990s American punk rock band

- Origin: Richmond, Virginia, US
- Genres: Punk rock; post-hardcore; hardcore punk; emo
- Years active: 1991–1996; 2007; 2010
- Labels: Pop A Wheelie; A-F; No Idea
- Members: Thomas Barnett; Mark Avery; Russ Jones; Rob Huddleston; Leer Baker

Inquisition was an American punk rock band from Richmond, Virginia, United States. They influenced the local scene, and several members went on to form other bands such as Strike Anywhere, River City High, and Ann Beretta.

The band was formed in 1991 when some of the band members were still in high school. In 1992 the original bass player, Leer Baker, left the band and was replaced by Rob Huddleston. They recorded their first full-length album, Broken Songs, and appeared on several 7 inch records and compilations. Their most well-known recording, Revolution, I Think It's Called Inspiration, was released in early 1996 on Pop A Wheelie Records and was re-released in October 2005 on A-F Records. Sam Sutherland of Exclaim! noted about the project, "A striking unit unto themselves, Inquisition prove their worthy of new attention in light of this fine reissue."

Their final show was on September 8, 1996, at the Biograph Theatre in Richmond, Virginia with AFI and The Pee Tanks. However, the band came back to Richmond for two reunion shows on May 18 and May 19, 2007. A live CD/DVD featuring the band's reunion performances was released on March 18, 2008, via No Idea Records. Thomas and other members have been known to play acoustic Inquisition sets to small audiences since the reunion, most recently in Richmond on September 21, 2010, with Kevin Seconds.

== Members ==
- Thomas Barnett (vocals)
- Mark Avery (guitar)
- Rob Huddleston (bass, vocals, 1992–1996)
- Russ Jones (drums)
- Leer Baker (bass, 1991–1992)

== Discography ==
- Touch the Sun EP (Catheter/Assembly Records - Cassette Only, 1992)
- To Free Them From Fear
- Broken Songs (Homeless Records - Limited release of only 500 Cassettes & 1000 CD's, 1993)
- Ideas Are Bulletproof 7" (Sound Hole Records, 1995)
- We Got A Bomb 7" - Split with Kilara (Pop A Wheelie Records, 1995)
- Revolution, I Think It's Called Inspiration (CD) (Pop A Wheelie Records, 1996)
- Revolution, I Think It's Called Inspiration (LP) (Seven Lucky Records, 2001)
- Revolution, I Think It's Called Inspiration (CD Reissue) (A-F Records, 2005)
- Uproar: Live And Loud (CD/DVD) (No Idea Records, 2008)
