= Where No One Knows My Name =

Enemy You

Studio album by Enemy You
- Released: 1999
- Recorded: 1998 at Westbeach Recorders
- Genres: Punk rock, melodic hardcore
- Length: 25:29
- Label: Panic Button/Lookout

Enemy You chronology
Enemy You (1999)	Stories Never Told (2004)

Professional ratings
Review scores
Source	Rating
Allmusic	3/5 stars

Where No One Knows My Name was the first full-length release from the San Francisco, California, punk rock band Enemy You. It was released in 1999 through Panic Button Records and Lookout! Records.

== Track listing ==
1. "Automaton" – 1:47
2. "Youth Anthems" – 1:47
3. "City of Lost Children" – 3:01
4. "Moral Absolutes" – 1:34
5. "By Design" – 1:26
6. "Awake" – 1:49
7. "All Good Things..." – 1:46
8. "Break Away" – 1:02
9. "Where No One Knows My Name" – 3:01
10. "Lock-Out" – 1:57
11. "(We Want) Someone To Blame" – 1:28
12. "Lord of The Flies" – 0:54
13. "Younger Days" – 2:15
14. "Hopes And Dreams" – 1:43
