= Death Chorus =

Studio album by Polar Bear Club
- Released: November 19, 2013
- Studio: Studio 4, Conshohocken, Pennsylvania
- Genre: Post-hardcore, alternative rock, punk rock, emo
- Length: 33:29
- Label: Rise
- Producer: Will Yip

Polar Bear Club chronology
Clash Battle Guilt Pride (2011)	Death Chorus (2013)

Singles from Death Chorus
- 1. "Blood Balloon" Released: September 5, 2013; 2. "Upstate Mosquito" Released: October 18, 2013

Professional ratings
Review scores
Source	Rating
AbsolutePunk	(85%)
Alternative Press	3.5/5 stars
Punknews.org	3.5/5 stars

Death Chorus is the fourth and final full-length studio album from upstate New York-based post-hardcore/punk rock band Polar Bear Club, released in 2013 through Rise Records. "Blood Balloon" and "Upstate Mosquito" were released as singles. In October and November, the band supported Taking Back Sunday on their headlining US tour. In November and December, the band went on tour with Citizen, Diamond Youth and Sainthood Reps.

== Background ==
Death Chorus was recorded at Studio 4 in Conshohocken, Pennsylvania with producer Will Yip, who also served as engineer. Ryan Smith mastered the album at Sterling Sound in New York City.

== Track listing ==
Track listing per booklet.

No.	Title	Length
1.	"Blood Balloon"	3:11
2.	"Graph Paper Glory Days"	2:48
3.	"So I Buy"	2:48
4.	"For Show"	4:08
5.	"Siouxsie Jeanne"	2:22
6.	"WLWYCD"	3:15
7.	"Chicago Spring"	3:26
8.	"When We Were College Kids"	2:39
9.	"Twang (Blister to Burn)"	3:13
10.	"Upstate Mosquito"	5:39
11.	"Saw Blade"	2:51
Total length:		36:24

== Personnel ==
Personnel per booklet.

Polar Bear Club

- Chris Browne – guitar
- Tyler Smith – bass
- Jimmy Stadt – vocals
- Steve Port – drums
- Pat Benson – guitar

Production and design

- Will Yip – producer, engineer
- Ryan Smith – mastering
- Richard Minino – illustrations, design
