= Detroit Grand Pubahs =

American hip hop group

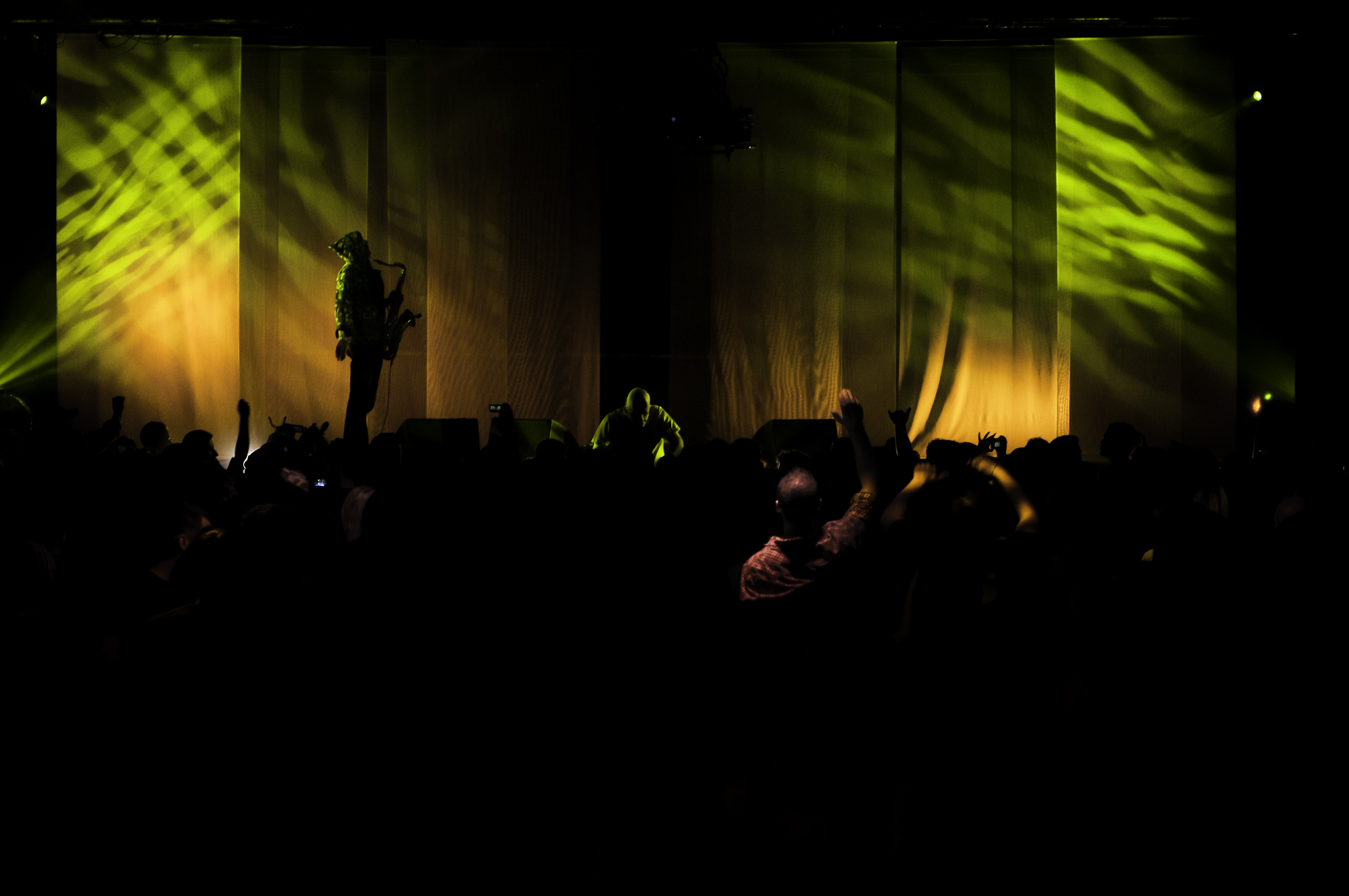
- Detroit Grand Pubahs performing live

Background information
- Origin: Detroit, Michigan, United States
- Genres: Detroit techno, electronic dance music
- Years active: 1998–present
- Labels: Throw, Jive Electro, Poker Flat, Detelefunk
- Members: Mack Goudy, Jr. Oliver Way; Dominique Gerin (saxophone); Mo T (guitar); Mitch Marcus (keyboards and saxophone)
- Past members: Andy Toth

The Detroit Grand Pubahs are an American musical group from Detroit, Michigan, comprising Paris the Black Fu (real name Mack Goudy Jr.) and The Mysterious Mr O. (real name Oliver Way). One of the founding members, Dr. Toefinger (real name Andy Toth), left in 2004. They are best known for their 2000 single "Sandwiches", which reached #29 on the Dance Club Songs chart.

The group was nominated for "Outstanding Funk Artist / Group" at the Detroit Music Awards in 2002. Rolling Stone called them "a group to watch..... this dynamic duo never ceases to amaze with creative use of found sound, foreboding vocals, and bizarre costumes". The group runs its own record label, Detelefunk, on which they release the group's own music and that of other artists.

== Biography ==
Both of the Pubahs started in music at an early age, with Toth starting to play drums in various local bands at age 16. Vocalist Goudy began DJing at a similar age, having been influenced by Jeff Mills' radio mix shows. After leaving school, Toth took a job as a sound engineer at a local recording studio, while Goudy continued to DJ and sing as one half of Heckle and Jeckle, with Jon Billebob Williams.

While both were active on the Detroit scene, they did not meet until they both happened to be working in the same restaurant. They got together and started producing music; their first release was "Sandwiches" – released in 2000 on Throw Records – and as its popularity spread, it was picked up by New York-based Jive Electro.

In 2001, they continued to tour their live act and released their debut studio album, Funk All Y'all, on Intuit-Solar. More singles, 2003's "The Clapper" and 2004's "Big Onion", followed on Poker Flat Recordings. The Pubahs' second album, Galactic Ass Creatures from Uranus, was released in 2004. At the same time, Toth left for other adventures and was replaced by The Mysterious Mr O.

After that, they continued to tour. In 2006, they hired Domguè as saxophone player and Mo T as guitarist for their live shows. For some live shows, a new drummer, Emeric Di Paolo, plays with them.

The third album, Nuttin' Butt Funk, was released in 2008 on their own label, Detelefunk.

== Discography ==
=== Studio albums ===
- Funk All Y'all (2001)
- Galactic Ass Creatures from Uranus (2004)
- Nuttin' Butt Funk (2008)
- Madd Circus (2010)

=== Remix albums ===
- BUttFUnkula and the Remixes from Earth (2009)

=== Compilation albums ===
- Detelefunk Vol. 1 (2011)

=== EPs ===
- The Mad Circus E.P. (1999)
- The Galactic Ass Creatures from Uranus (Remixes) (2004)
- Ride (Remixes) (2006)
- BUttFUnkula and the Remixes from Earth Vol. 1 (2009)
- BUttFUnkula and the Remixes from Earth Vol. 2 (2009)

=== Singles ===
- "Sandwiches" (2000)
- "Ride" (2001) (promo)
- "The Clapper" (2003)
- "Big Onion" (2004)
- "Assistance from an Unknown Source/Plasticene Gene" (2005)
- "Surrender" (2005)
- "Black Matters" (2006)
- "Blind Date" (2006)
- "Riot 66" (2006)
- "Birth in Zero Gravity" (2007)
- "Skydive from Venus" (2007)
- "Thanks for Coming" (2008)
- "Rollin' Papers & Bush" (2008)
- "Numb Deaf & Dumb" (2010)
