= Clash Battle Guilt Pride =

Studio album by Polar Bear Club
- Released: September 13, 2011
- Recorded: April 6 – May 4, 2011 at Salad Days Studio in Baltimore, Maryland
- Genre: Post-hardcore, punk rock, emo
- Length: 40:11
- Label: Bridge Nine
- Producer: Brian McTernan

Polar Bear Club chronology
Chasing Hamburg (2009)	Clash Battle Guilt Pride (2011)	Death Chorus (2013)

Professional ratings
Review scores
Source	Rating
Allmusic	4/5 stars
Rock Sound	(9/10)
AbsolutePunk.net	(85%)
Punknews.org	4.5/5 stars

Clash Battle Guilt Pride is the third studio album and second official release on Bridge 9 Records from American rock band Polar Bear Club.

== Release ==
In April and May, the band participated in the Take Action Tour. In July and August, the group went on a tour of Europe with support from Man Overboard. It was released on September 13, 2011 through Bridge 9 Records. In March and April 2012, the band supported The Wonder Years on the Glamour Kills Spring 2012 tour in the US. To promote the tour, a compilation album was released that featured the bands covering one of the other bands' songs. Polar Bear Club's contribution was a cover of the Transit track "Skipping Stone".

== Track listing ==
No.	Title	Length
1.	"Pawner"	2:57
2.	"Killin It"	3:09
3.	"Screams in Caves"	3:46
4.	"Kneel on Nails"	3:37
5.	"My Best Days"	4:11
6.	"Life Between the Lines"	3:52
7.	"I'll Never Leave New York"	2:50
8.	"Bottled Wind"	3:52
9.	"Slow Roam"	4:17
10.	"Religion on the Radio"	3:03
11.	"3/4 Tango"	4:40
Total length:		40:10

== Personnel ==
Polar Bear Club

- Jimmy Stadt – vocals
- Chris Browne – guitar, backing vocals
- Nate Morris – guitar
- Erik Henning – bass
- Emmett Menke – drums

Studio personnel

- Brian McTernan – production, engineering

Additional personnel

- Richard Minino – artwork and illustrations

== Details ==
- Studio: Salad Days Studio in Baltimore, Maryland
- Recording type: studio
- Recording mode: stereo
- SPARS code: n/a
