= Enemy You =

American punk band

- Origin: San Francisco, California, United States
- Genres: Punk rock, pop punk, melodic hardcore
- Years active: 1997–2007
- Labels: Panic Button Records, Red Scare Industries, Geykido Comet Records, Nitro Records
- Past members: David Jones (deceased); Ken Yamazaki; Joe Yamazaki; Mark Tamo; Tyson "Chicken" Annicharico; Chris Matulich

Enemy You was an American punk rock band from San Francisco, California that formed in 1997.

== Biography ==
Prior to Enemy You's formation, David Jones, the band's main songwriter, recorded several releases with his pop punk band After School Special on Mutant Pop Records. The group never toured or played a show, but still had a small dedicated following. Jones met Ken Yamazaki in 1994, and the two bonded over their love for Bad Religion, a band that became a major inspiration for Enemy You.

Following the disbandment of After School Special in 1997, David Jones, Ken and his brother Joe Yamazaki, and Mark Tamo (employee at Fat Wreck Chords recruited to the band by Jones) formed Enemy You. Through Fat Wreck Chords, the band received interest from Ben Weasel of Screeching Weasel, who was starting a sub-label under Lookout Records called Panic Button Records. This led to Enemy You's debut appearance on the Panic Button compilation album Four On The Floor alongside Screeching Weasel, Moral Crux, and Teen Idols in January of 1999.

In October of 1999, Enemy You released their debut album, Where No One Knows My Name. Due to the album's success, the band was asked to open for a number of notable punk bands including Bouncing Souls, Lagwagon, Bad Religion, T.S.O.L., Mad Caddies, and NOFX. Following the release of Where no one Knows my Name, bassist Mark Tamo left the band and was replaced by Tyson "Chicken" Annicharico. Enemy You later released a 7-inch on the Fat Club series on Fat Wreck Chords in 2001. They followed that with a 1980s-themed seven inch EP that came out on Geykido Comet Records, titled Video to Radio in 2003. The EP was re-released in 2017, with all the proceeds going to suicide prevention.

Following the initial release of Video to Radio, Chicken was replaced by Chris Matulich, who stayed as Enemy You's bassist up until the band's disbandment in 2015. In November 2004, Enemy You released their second album, Stories Never Told on Red Scare Industries. David was close friends with label owner, Toby Jeg, and the label re-released Where No One Knows My Name in 2005. The band then signed with Nitro Records, and recorded their third studio album, Fade Away. The album was not released until a few years later in December 2008, when it came out as an iTunes Store exclusive unbeknownst to the band. By this time, Nitro Records had gone under Bicycle Music Company, and the band was not able to buy back the rights to Fade Away. Vocalist David Jones committed suicide in March 2015, causing the disbandment of Enemy You.

== Members ==
- David Jones - lead vocals, guitar
- Ken Yamazaki - guitar
- Joe Yamazaki - drums
- Mark Tamo - bass guitar
- Tyson "Chicken" Annicharico - bass guitar
- Chris Matulich - bass guitar

== Discography ==
=== Albums ===
- 1999: Where No One Knows My Name - Panic Button/Lookout
- 2004: Stories Never Told - Red Scare
- 2008: Fade Away (iTunes Exclusive) - Nitro Records

=== EPs ===
- 2001: Fat Club 7-inch - Fat Wreck Chords
- 2002: Video To Radio 7-inch - Geykido Comet Records

=== Compilation appearances ===
- 1999: Four on the Floor - Panic Button/Lookout
- 1999: Short Music for Short People - Fat Wreck Chords
- 2002: Thrasher Video "Scorchin' Summer" Thrasher magazine
- 2003: 8 Ball Zine Compilation (Spain)
- 2004: Every Dog Will Have Its Day - Adeline Records
- 2004: Radio Disaster Vol. 8 V/A - Basement Records
- 2005: This Just In... Benefit For Indy Media - Geykido Comet Records
- 2005: AMP Presents Vol. 4 Pop Punk - American Music Press (AMP)
- 2009: Wrecktrospective - Fat Wreck Chords
