= Change Is a Sound =

Studio album by Strike Anywhere
- Released: August 14, 2001
- Recorded: April 2001 at Salad Days Studios, Baltimore, MD
- Genre: Punk rock, melodic hardcore, post-hardcore
- Length: 29:29
- Label: Jade Tree
- Producer: Brian McTernan

Strike Anywhere chronology
Chorus of One (2001)	Change Is a Sound (2001)	Exit English (2003)

Professional ratings
Review scores
Source	Rating
AllMusic	4.5/5 stars
Kerrang!	3/5 stars
Metal Hammer	5/10

Change Is a Sound is the debut album by the punk rock band Strike Anywhere, released in 2001. The album's lyrics explore such themes as women's rights ("Chalkline"), and police brutality ("Sunset on 32nd Street"). The song "Refusal" was also featured on the soundtrack to the skateboarding video game Tony Hawk's Underground. The band signed to Jade Tree in February 2001, and recorded their debut album in April 2001.

== Additional information ==
The picture for the cover of this album was taken on their first European Tour. The head seen in the side of the image is that of Tony Pence, lead singer of the punk band Deep Sleep and former Reptillian Records employee.

Barnett described album as being "built on a lot of local experiences, like local stories". The title of track 8, "S.S.T.", is an abbreviation of the Latin phrase Sic semper tyrannis.

== Release ==
Change Is a Sound was released in August 2001. In September, the band appeared on the last few dates on the Plea for Peace/Take Action Tour. Between October and December 2001, the band toured across Europe with As Friends Rust and Planes Mistaken for Stars. In January and February 2002, the band supported the Mighty Mighty Bosstones on their headlining east coast US tour. Following this, the band toured with Anti-Flag until April as part of their Mobilie for Peace tour. In June and July 2002, the band supported Good Riddance on their headlining US tour. Barnett said they were offered a supporting slot for Soul Brains, "but we had been out for like 9 weeks already and we had to get home and get back to work.

== Track listing ==
All tracks are written by Strike Anywhere.

No.	Title	Length
1.	"You're Fired"	2:04
2.	"Timebomb Generation"	2:18
3.	"Refusal"	2:41
4.	"Laughter in a Police State"	2:07
5.	"Sunset on 32nd Street"	4:19
6.	"Detonation"	3:01
7.	"Riot of Words"	2:29
8.	"S.S.T."	2:32
9.	"Chalkline"	2:39
10.	"Three on a Match"	1:48
11.	"My Design"	3:07
Total length:		29:29

== Personnel ==
- Jeremy Dean – Layout Design
- Alan Douches – Mastering
- Brian McTernan – Producer, Engineer, Mixing
- Tim Owen – Photography, Portrait Photography
- Garth Petrie – Band
- Matt Sherwood – Band
- Matthew Jordan Smith – Photography, Cover Art Concept
- Strike Anywhere – Producer
