= Team Goldie =

American rapper

- Origin: Philadelphia, Pennsylvania, USA
- Genres: Pop; rock; hip hop
- Years active: 2004-2015, 2022-Present
- Labels: Unsigned / SWT CHN MSC
- Members: Matt DiStefano
- Website: www.teamgoldie.com

Team Goldie is the solo project of Pennsylvania-based singer, rapper and multi-instrumentalist Matt DiStefano. Started as a strictly studio project in the Summer of 2004, DiStefano combines elements of hip-hop, punk and indie-rock into his own genre-bending style of pop music. It has been described as "a buffet of Daft Punk, Beastie Boys, Panic! at the Disco and N.E.R.D., studied under Atom and His Package and Girl Talk but from the brain of a Weezer fan."

He began performing live in the Fall of 2004 and over the following years went on to open for the likes of Gym Class Heroes, MC Lars, Girl Talk, Plain White Ts, Ted Leo, Boys Like Girls and many more as well as perform at the Broadcast Music Incorporated (BMI) Showcase and Angels & Kings as a part of the CMJ Music Marathon.

He has 8 releases, most recently releasing the album Trailblazer, and has done official remixes for artists including Ra Ra Riot ("Each Year," "Boy") and Polar Bear Club ("Drifting Thing"). The remix of Polar Bear Club's "Drifting Thing" was released by Bridge 9 Records as a 7 inch record (limited to a pressing of 500) during their 2010 Mystery Box Sale.

In 2012, he formed a full band for live performances made up of Clark Vincent (drums), Joe Robinson (bass), Erich Bigas (guitar), and Mike Yaeger (guitar) until they ceased performing in late 2013.

Team Goldie returned to play one final solo show on October 2, 2015 in Philadelphia, PA.

On October 6, 2022, Team Goldie announced his return and released the first new music for the project in 10 years. On July 26, 2024 Team Goldie released the full-length album Trailblazer.

== Discography ==
- Demo (2005)
- Anniversary (2005)
- Anniversaremix: Borrowed and Blue (2006)
- Team Goldie (2008)
- Diversions Vol. 1 (2010)
- Polar Bear Club - Drifting Thing (Team Goldie Remix) 7" (2010)
- New Year's Eve (2010)
- Going Out Living (2012)
- Trailblazer (2024)

== Singles ==
- "I'm Back" (2022)
- "Big Riff" (2022)
- "Roses" (2022)
- "Stockton 2 Malone" (2023)
- "Trailblazer" (2024)
