= The Redder, the Better =

EP by Polar Bear Club
- Released: May 21, 2006
- Recorded: January 2 – 7, 2006 at Nada Recording Studio in New Windsor, New York
- Genre: Post-hardcore, indie rock, emo, hardcore, pop punk
- Length: 17:42
- Label: Triple Attack/Luchador
- Producer: John Naclerio

Polar Bear Club chronology
Demo (2005)	The Redder, the Better (2006)	Sometimes Things Just Disappear (2008)

Alternative covers
- Work in progress version of the original cover artwork, never printed.

Alternative cover
- Vinyl cover artwork, printed with spot varnish and embossed logo and title.

Professional ratings
Review scores
Source	Rating
Punknews.org	4.5/5 stars

The Redder, the Better, released on May 21, 2006 through Triple Attack Records in conjunction with Luchador Records, is the debut EP and first official release from the upstate New York-based post-hardcore/indie rock band Polar Bear Club. It gained the band an unexpected growth of fanbase and received mostly very favorable reviews.

== Track listing ==
No.	Title	Length
1.	"Election Day"	2:53
2.	"Resent and Resistance"	3:15
3.	"His Devotee"	3:49
4.	"Parked in the Parking Lot of Your Heart"	3:57
5.	"Most Miserable Life"	3:48
Total length:		17:42

== Release history ==
Region	Date	Label	Format	Catalog #
United States	May 21, 2006	Triple Attack Records	CD	TAR005
United States	May 21, 2006	Luchador Records	CD	LDR004
United States; Canada	August 25, 2009	Bridge Nine Records	12" vinyl	B9R127

== Personnel ==
Polar Bear Club

- Jimmy Stadt - vocals
- Chris Browne - guitar, backing vocals
- Greg Odom - bass
- Bob O'Neil - drums

Studio personnel

- John Naclerio - production and engineering

Additional personnel

- Rob Antonucci - artwork and illustration
- Jenna Carrington - artwork and illustration

== Details ==
- Recording type: studio
- Recording mode: stereo
- SPARS code: n/a
