= Jagged Thoughts =

Studio album by American Steel
- Released: June 19, 2001
- Recorded: February 2001 at Sharkbite Studios, Oakland, CA
- Genre: Punk
- Length: 43:42
- Label: Lookout Records

American Steel chronology
Rogue's March (1999)	Jagged Thoughts (2001)	Destroy Their Future (2007)

Professional ratings
Review scores
Source	Rating
Allmusic	link
Kerrang!	4/5 stars

Jagged Thoughts is the third album by Oakland punk band American Steel. It was released in 2001 by Lookout Records. The album is a departure from their earlier releases, focusing less on aggressive ska-punk and showing a larger Clash influence.

== Track listing ==
1. "Shrapnel" – 4:28
2. "New Religion Every Day" – 3:23
3. "Rainy Day" – 4:11
4. "There's a New Life" – 1:32
5. "Lonely All the Time" – 4:42
6. "Maria" – 4:52
7. "Time Gone By" – 1:54
8. "Turn It Out" – 2:29
9. "Two Crooks" – 2:40
10. "Wake Up Alone" – 2:44
11. "I Don't Mind" – 5:13
12. "Day To Night (Like a Hint)" – 5:34
