= Dear Friends and Gentle Hearts =

Studio album by American Steel
- Released: July 21, 2009
- Recorded: Sharkbite Studios, Oakland, California
- Genre: Punk rock
- Label: Fat Wreck Chords

American Steel chronology
Destroy Their Future (2007)	Dear Friends and Gentle Hearts (2009)

Professional ratings
Review scores
Source	Rating
AllMusic	3.5/5 stars
Alternative Press	3.5/5

Dear Friends and Gentle Hearts is the fifth studio album by Oakland punk band American Steel, released on Fat Wreck Chords on July 21, 2009. The title references a phrase found written on a scrap of paper found in Stephen Foster's pocket after his death.

The tracks, "Emergency House Party" and "Safe and Sound", were released as free downloads on the Fat Wreck Chords website. The album is released on CD and vinyl and comes with a download card insert.

== Track listing ==
1. "Emergency House Party"
2. "Tear the Place Apart"
3. "Safe and Sound"
4. "Your Ass Ain't Laughing Now"
5. "The Blood Gets Everywhere"
6. "From Here to Hell"
7. "Dear Friends and Gentle Hearts"
8. "Lights Out"
9. "Bergamot"
10. "Where You Want to Be"
11. "Finally Alone"
12. "Meals & Entertainment"
