= Sandwiches (song) =

2000 single by Detroit Grand Pubahs

Single by Detroit Grand Pubahs

from the album Mad Circus EP
- Released: 2000
- Genre: Electroclash
- Length: 22:58 (12" version), 46:58 (CD version 1)
- Label: Jive
- Songwriters: Mack Goudy, Jr., Andy Toth

Detroit Grand Pubahs singles chronology
"Sandwiches" (2000)	"Funk All Y'all" (2001)

"Sandwiches" is a song by American electronic band Detroit Grand Pubahs. It reached number 29 on the Hot Dance Club Songs chart.

== Track listing ==
12" vinyl version
No.	Title	Length
1.	"Sandwiches (Original)"	3:04
2.	"Sandwiches (F.A.F. Bite Size Edit)"	3:40
3.	"Sandwiches (Krafty Kuts Toasted Mix)"	5:17
4.	"Sandwiches (Original Mix)"	5:55
5.	"Sandwiches (F.A.F. Butties Mix)"	5:42

CD version 1
No.	Title	Length
1.	"Radio Edit"	3:06
2.	"Krafty Kuts Edit"	3:37
3.	"Original 12" Version"	5:56
4.	"Bloated "Quarter Pounder" Mix"	7:05
5.	"Bloated "Evil Bread" Mix"	9:33
6.	"Krafty Kuts Mix"	5:18
7.	"Pu Bah Funk"	6:56
8.	"Responsible Space Playboys Mix"	6:00
9.	"Acapella"	0:47

== Charts ==
Chart (2000)	Peak position
Australia (ARIA Charts)	73
