= Strike Anywhere =

American punk rock band

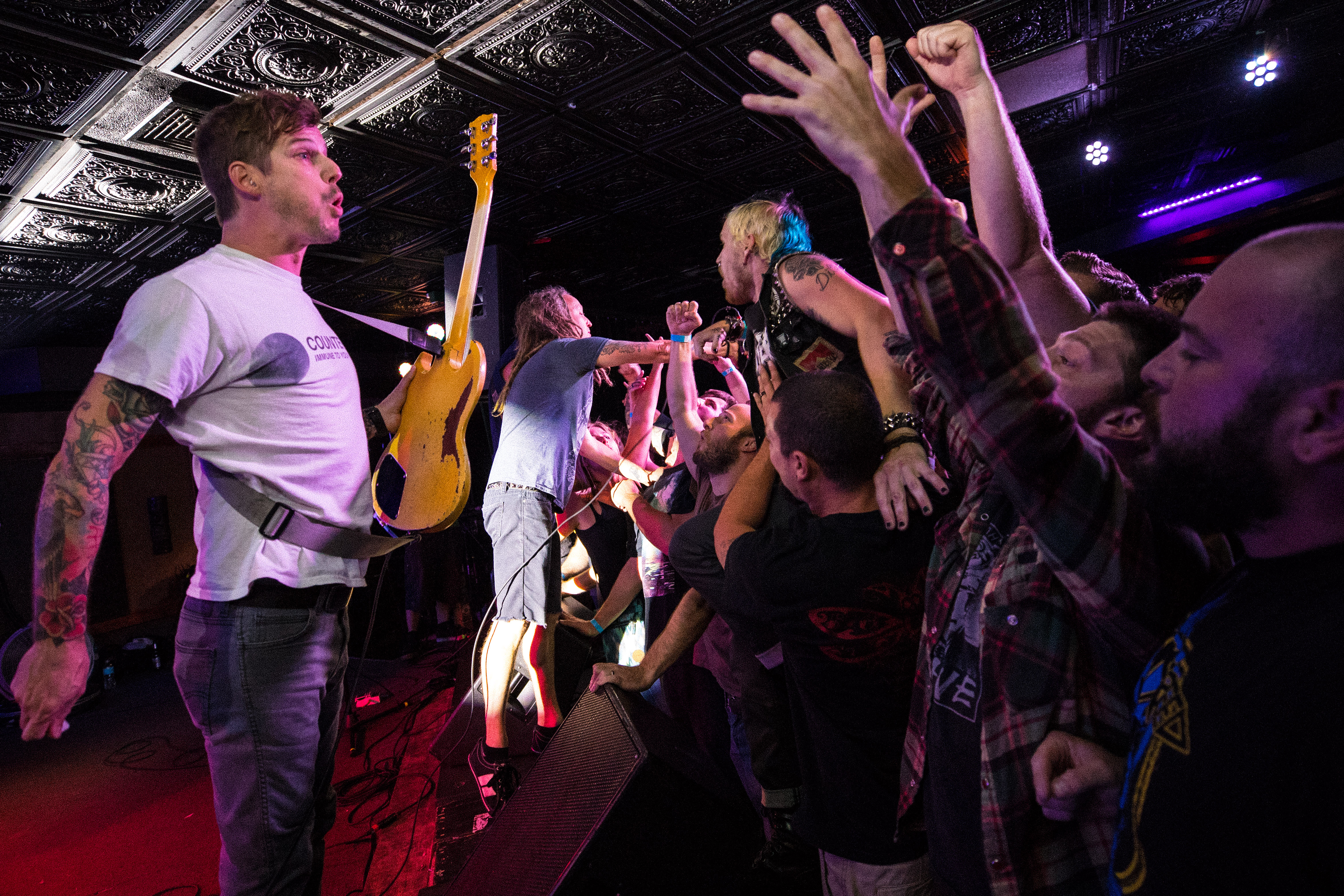
- Strike Anywhere performing in Virginia Beach on October 7, 2016.

Background information
- Origin: Richmond, Virginia, United States
- Genres: Melodic hardcore, anarcho-punk, punk rock
- Years active: 1999–present
- Labels: Pure Noise, Jade Tree, Fat Wreck Chords, Bridge Nine, No Idea, Chunksaah, Red Leader, Scene Police
- Spinoff of: Inquisition
- Members: Thomas Barnett; Matt Smith; Garth Petrie; Eric Kane; Mark Miller
- Past members: Matt Sherwood
- Website: www.strikeanywherepunx.com

Strike Anywhere is an American punk rock band from Richmond, Virginia. Formed in 1999 after the demise of frontman Thomas Barnett's previous band, Inquisition, they took their name from the Inquisition song "Strike Anywhere". Their music is characterized by fast tempos, catchy melodies, and emotionally charged vocals delivered via shouting and singing.

The band received an increased amount of attention after their music appeared in three Tony Hawk video games: Tony Hawk's Underground in 2003 ("Refusal"), Tony Hawk's American Wasteland in 2005 ("Question the Answer"), and Tony Hawk's Downhill Jam in 2006 ("The Promise"). They were also featured in the documentary, Wake Up Screaming, about the 2005 Vans Warped Tour.

== History ==
The band's logo

The band embarked on their first tour, spanning four weeks from May 29 to June 30, 2000, across the entire United States with Florida melodic hardcore band As Friends Rust. The tour included several cross-over shows with Glasseater, Mid Carson July and The Agency (the three of which were on tour together), as well as stops to play such festivals as Mixed Messages in Minneapolis, Minnesota and Pheer Festival in College Park, Maryland. Strike Anywhere again teamed up with As Friends Rust for their first European and British tour, which spanned five weeks from October 29 to December 5, 2001. A highlight performance at London, England's Camden Underworld from midway through the tour, on November 16, 2001, was filmed and later released on video and DVD by British home video company Punkervision in December 2002.

The band played their last show with guitarist Matt Sherwood in Auckland, New Zealand on March 17, 2007, with Mark Miller replacing Sherwood. Since then, the band has continued its regimen of international touring, including the group's first South American tour, where they played Brazil and Colombia. In an interview in December 2016, Barnett confirmed that the band is currently working on a fifth studio album. On July 17, 2020 the band released an EP titled Nightmares of the West via Pure Noise Records. The EP contained seven newly recorded songs that were the result of ideas that had been exchanged between bandmates over the course of the 2010s decade.

== Political stance ==
Strike Anywhere lyrics touch on such issues as police brutality, anti-capitalism, women's rights, animal rights, and globalization. They have also contributed tracks to political benefit albums, such as a live version of "Sunset on 32nd" for 1157 Wheeler Avenue: A Memorial for Amadou Diallo and "To the World" for the Rock Against Bush, Vol. 1 album. According to the liner notes for their album Change is a Sound, they support "the vegetarian lifestyle, the living wage movement and the fight against corporate globalization". With its 2006 release Dead FM, the band expanded their political slogans to address "more sociological ideas about why these (events) happen".

Their logo is similar to the Three Arrows symbol and the Antifascist Circle, and includes the logo of the former social democracy/antifascist German Iron Front, a paramilitary organization which existed in the last years of the Weimar Republic.

Strike Anywhere generally allows audience members to record their live performances for personal, non-commercial use, and has gone so far as to authorize the Internet Archive to create a section where fans can upload and share their recordings.

== Musical style and influence ==
Critics have categorized Strike Anywhere's music as melodic hardcore, anarcho-punk, and punk rock.

They have cited influences including Turning Point, Judge, Subhumans, Flipper, D.I., Four Walls Falling, Teen Idles, Deadline, State of Alert, Fugazi, Gorilla Biscuits, Dag Nasty, Crass, Conflict, Kid Dynamite, Lifetime, Refused, Bad Brains, Cro-Mags and oi!.

== Members ==
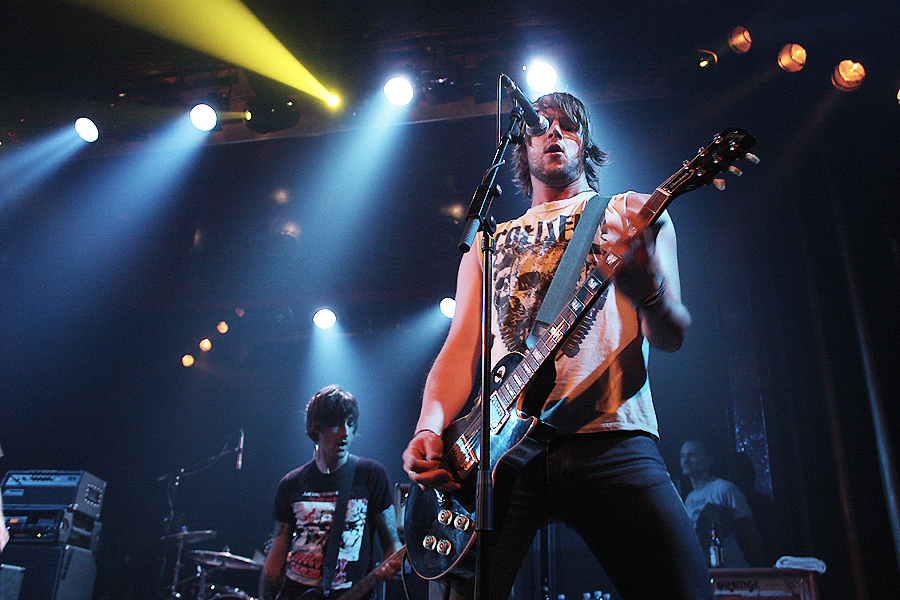
Strike Anywhere in Barcelona in 2010.

=== Current ===
- Thomas Barnett - vocals (1999–present)
- Matt Smith - guitar, vocals (1999–present)
- Garth Petrie - bass (1999–present)
- Eric Kane - drums (1999–present)
- Mark Miller - guitar, vocals (2007–present)

=== Former ===
- Matt Sherwood - guitar, vocals (1999–2007)

== Discography ==
=== Studio albums ===
- Change is a Sound (Jade Tree Records, 2001)
- Exit English (Jade Tree Records, 2003)
- Dead FM (Fat Wreck Chords, 2006)
- Iron Front (Bridge Nine Records, 2009)

=== EPs ===
- Chorus of One (Red Leader Records (CD)/No Idea Records (LP), 2000)
- Fat Club (Fat Wreck Chords, 2001)
- Underground Europe 2001: Genoa Benefit EP (The 1999 Demos) (Scene Police, 2001)
- Iron Front EP (Bridge Nine Records 2009) - Digital EP
- Live at the Montage Music Hall (Bridge Nine Records, 2012)
- Nightmares of the West (Pure Noise Records, 2020)

=== Compilation albums ===
- To Live in Discontent (Jade Tree Records (CD)/Chunksaah Records (LP), 2005)

=== Live albums ===
- Live at Camden Underworld (2001, Split live album with As Friends Rust)
- In Defiance of Empty Times (Bridge Nine Records (CD/LP), 2012, Acoustic live album)

=== Compilation appearances ===
- 1157 Wheeler Avenue: A Memorial for Amadou Diallo (Failed Experiment, 2002)
  - Includes the exclusive "Sunset on 32nd [Live]"
- Punk Goes Acoustic (Fearless Records, 2003)
  - Includes the exclusive "Chalk Line"
- Prisoners Of War: A Benefit For Peter Young (The Saturday Team, 2007)
  - Includes "You Are Not Collateral Damage", later included on Keep Singing! A Benefit Compilation for Compassion Over Killing (2008)
- Wrecktrospective (Fat Wreck, 2009)
  - Includes both tracks from the Fat Club 7"

== Related bands ==
- Inquisition - Thomas Barnett
- Great Collapse - Thomas Barnett
- MAäSK - Thomas Barnett
- Liars Academy - Matt Smith
- Senses Fail - Matt Smith
- Evening Shadows-Matt Smith
- The Exploder - Eric Kane, Matt Smith
- Pygmy Lush - Eric Kane
- Widows - Eric Kane, Mark Miller
- Sports Bar - Mark Miller
- Count Me Out - Garth Petrie
- Park Sparrows - Garth Petrie
