= Madd Circus =

Studio album by Detroit Grand Pubahs
- Released: 2010
- Genre: Electronic dance music
- Length: 60:48
- Label: DetEleFunk

Detroit Grand Pubahs chronology
Nuttin' Butt Funk (2008)	Madd Circus (2010)

Professional ratings
Review scores
Source	Rating
BBC Music	(favorable)
PopMatters	6/10 stars
URB	3/5 stars

Madd Circus is the fifth studio album by American electronic band Detroit Grand Pubahs.

== Track listing ==
No.	Title	Writer(s)	Length
1.	"Clown Mogile/Logged Inn"	Goudy	0:47
2.	"Autotragik"	Di Paolo, Goudy	4:20
3.	"I Didn't Want to Party"	Goudy	4:39
4.	"White Pigeon"	Goudy, Jenefsky	3:29
5.	"No Hoes in My Studio (Skit)"	Goudy	1:03
6.	"Zombies Playing Dead"	Goudy	3:12
7.	"Much Better"	Goudy	7:11
8.	"Mysterious Sights"	Way	4:36
9.	"Numb, Deaf & Dumb"	Di Paolo, Goudy	4:24
10.	"Jealous of a Dead Man (Skit)"		1:03
11.	"Breakfast in Bed"	Goudy, Jenefsky	3:36
12.	"Mashed Potatoes"	Guerini, Marcus, Way	4:15
13.	"I Don't Mind"	Di Paolo, Goudy	1:56
14.	"Maybe I Do"	Goudy	2:43
15.	"Madd Circus"	Goudy	3:46
16.	"Clone Mobile/I Gets in 9 GetOut"	Goudy	3:38
17.	"White Pigeon (Acapella)"	Goudy	2:36
18.	"Numb, Deaf & Dumb (Acapella)"	Goudy	3:34
