= Thomas Barnett (musician) =

American singer-songwriter (born 1973)

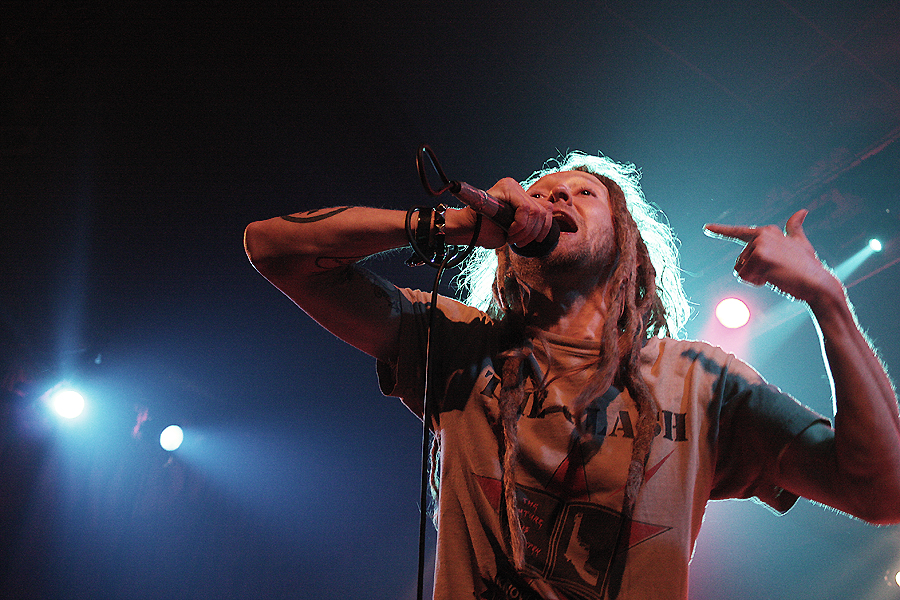

Background information
- Born: March 3, 1973 (age 53)
- Origin: Richmond, Virginia, US
- Genres: Melodic hardcore; hardcore punk; post-punk
- Occupations: Musician; songwriter
- Instrument: Vocals
- Years active: 1991–present
- Labels: Jade Tree; Fat Wreck Chords; Bridge Nine; End Hits; Pure Noise
- Formerly of: Strike Anywhere; Inquisition; Great Collapse; MAäSK

Thomas Barnett (born March 3, 1973) is an American singer-songwriter born in Richmond, Virginia. He is best known for being the singer for the melodic hardcore band Strike Anywhere. Barnett has been the vocalist and lyricist for the band since its formation in 1999. He was also the vocalist and primary lyricist for the band Inquisition until its disbanding in 1996. Inquisition reformed for a three show reunion event in May 2007. Strike Anywhere plays about twenty five shows a year between Europe and the United States-special events, benefit shows and festivals mostly-and remains an active band despite slowing down its recording and touring schedule. Thomas also formed a melodic hardcore project based on the West Coast called Great Collapse with ex-members of Rise Against and Set Your Goals among others. They tour occasionally and have released two LPs ( Holy War and Neither Washington Nor Moscow...Again!, both on End Hits Records) and two EPs. While living in Ventura, California, Thomas joined with members of Catholic Spit, The Return, The Missing 23rd and Stalag 13 to form MAäSK, a death rock and post punk experiment that yielded a self released EP titled Eclipse of Man, and around a dozen southern and central California shows that involved a fog machine, a Siouxsie and the Banshees cover, and a Discharge cover.

Thomas is a strong supporter for animal rights and is vegan.
