= American Steel =

American punk rock band

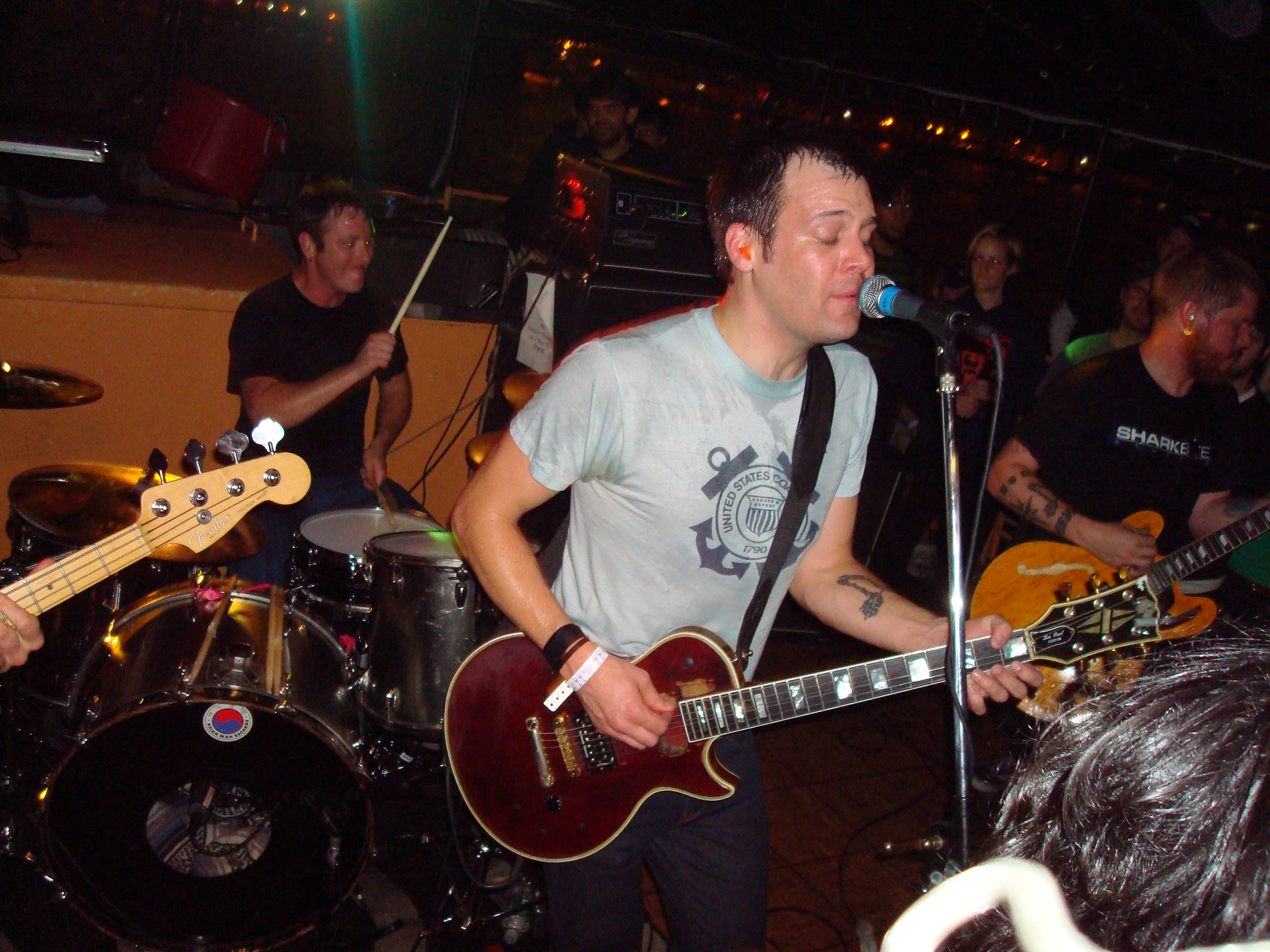

Background information
- Origin: Oakland, California, USA
- Genres: Punk rock
- Years active: 1995–present
- Labels: Fat Wreck Chords, Lookout! Records
- Spinoff of: Communiqué
- Members: Rory Henderson; Ryan Massey; John Peck; Scott Healy
- Past members: Jamie Kissinger; John Cheatham; Jeff Clark

American Steel is an American punk rock band formed in 1995 in Oakland, California. When offered their first show, the group took their name from the block-long sign on the warehouse across the street. After playing at parties and smaller venues around the Bay Area for over a year, and undergoing several lineup changes, the band bought a van and embarked on their first tour of the US, lasting 32 days and covering 12,000 miles.

After returning from tour, American Steel recorded their eponymous first album for San Francisco's New Disorder Records.

In the spring of 1999, American Steel signed to Lookout! and released Rogue's March in October 1999. The recording process was intermittent, due to guitarist Ryan's initial diagnosis and early battle with leukemia. 2000 saw the band tour in both the U.S. and Canada, including appearances at South by Southwest and CMJ. Their third full-length, Jagged Thoughts followed in 2001.

Following this, American Steel changed their name and sound in 2002, becoming Communiqué.

The band reunited in 2007, and signed to Fat Wreck Chords. They released a new album entitled Destroy Their Future on October 2, 2007. They toured with Alkaline Trio in the summer of 2008 and with Donots in the fall of 2008 in Europe. In March 2009 they announced recording had begun on a second album for Fat Wreck Chords, Dear Friends and Gentle Hearts, which was released July 21, 2009.

== Members ==
- Rory Henderson- Vocals, Guitar
- Ryan Massey- Guitar, Vocals
- John Peck- Bass, Vocals
- Scott Healy- Drums

== Discography ==
=== Albums ===
- American Steel (New Disorder, 1998, re-released on Red Scare, 2026)
- Rogue's March (Lookout!, 1999)
- Jagged Thoughts (Lookout, 2001)
- Destroy Their Future (Fat Wreck, 2007)
- Dear Friends and Gentle Hearts (Fat Wreck, 2009)

=== 7-inch singles and EPs ===
- Hope Wanted (1996)
- Every New Morning (Cheetah Records, 1998)
- "Fat Club" 7" (Fat Wreck Chords, 2000)
- "State of Grace" 7" (Fat Wreck Chords, 2019)
- Rotting (Red Scare, 2026)

=== Compilation appearances ===
- "One Of These Days (demo)" from Worse Than Alternative: Its Another Punk Comp 1997
- "Latchkey Kid" (alternate), "Whos Counting?" from Ramencore 1997 [both exclusive]
- "Close Enough Away" from Live at KZSU 1998 [live]
- "Loaded Gun (demo)" from This Ain't Rocket Science 1999
- "Got A Backbeat" [taken from Rogue's March], from Lookout! Freakout (Lookout!, 2000)
- "Turn It Out" [taken from Jagged Thoughts] and "Shrapnel (demo version)" [exclusive track], from Lookout! Freakout episode 2 (Lookout!, 2001)
- "More Like A Dream", from Lookout! Freakout episode 3 (Lookout!, 2003) [exclusive track]
- "Maria" from Kitestringing: The Prison Literature Project [album version]
- "Trust" from A Little Something For Everyone (New Disorder) [album version]
- "Mean Streak" from Hanuk-Comp: From The Dreidel To The Grave (Fat Wreck Chords, 2008) [album version]
- "Dead And Broken" from Let Them Know: The Story Of Youth Brigade And BYO Records (BYO Records, 2009) [Alkaline Trio cover, exclusive]
- "Tear the Place Apart" from Harder, Fatter, Louder (Fat Wreck Chords, 2010)
- "Dark Corner" from The Songs of Tony Sly: A Tribute (Fat Wreck Chords, 2013) [Tony Sly cover]

=== Soundtrack/movie appearances ===
- "New Religion Every Day" from The New Guy 2002 (Courtesy of Lookout! Records) *Not included on feature soundtrack
