= Polar Bear Club =

American post-hardcore band

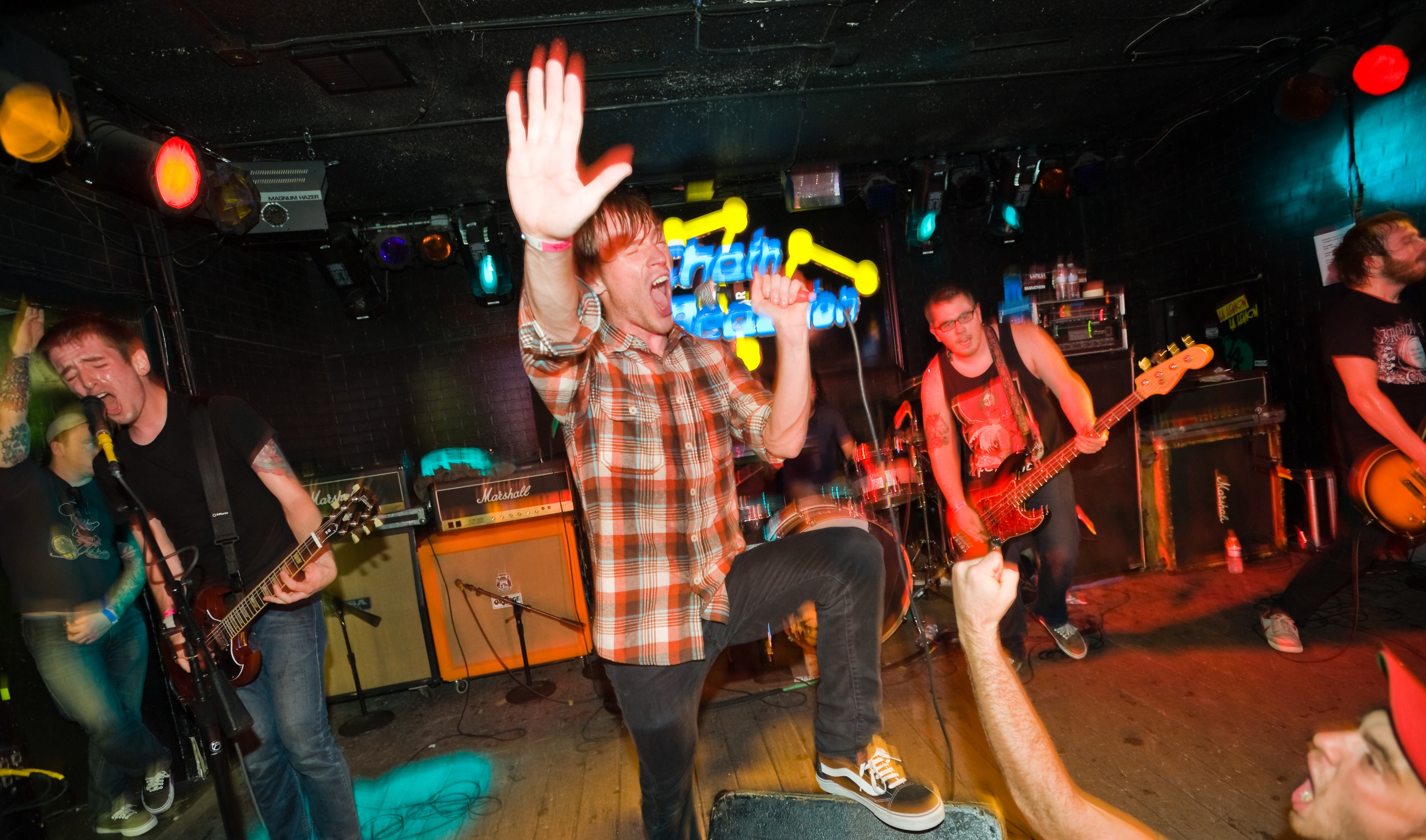
- Polar Bear Club in 2009

Background information
- Origin: Rochester and Syracuse, New York, US
- Genres: Post-hardcore, punk rock, alternative rock, emo, melodic hardcore, pop punk
- Years active: 2005–2014
- Labels: Bridge Nine, Red Leader, Triple Attack, Luchador, Rise Records
- Spinoff of: Marathon
- Past members: Jimmy Stadt; Chris Browne; Patrick Benson; Tyler Smith; Steve Port; Kevin Mahoney; Greg Odom; Josh Dillon; Bob O'Neil; Emmett Menke; Tyler Mahurin; Erik Henning; Nate Morris

Polar Bear Club was an American post-hardcore band from Rochester and Syracuse in upstate New York. Formed in 2005, the band underwent multiple line-up changes, with vocalist Jimmy Stadt and lead guitarist Chris Browne as the only consistent members. The band released four studio albums and toured internationally before announcing an indefinite hiatus in 2015.

== History ==
=== Early history (2005–2007) ===
Polar Bear Club formed in summer 2005 with its members coming from a variety of upstate New York-based hardcore punk and indie rock bands. They started as a spinoff of New York band Marathon. Their influences were said to include Small Brown Bike, Third Eye Blind, Hot Water Music, Jimmy Eat World, The Weakerthans, Lifetime, and Silent Majority, whose song "Polar Bear Club" the band was named after.

Shortly after the release of their debut five-song demo CD-R, they were noticed by Triple Attack Records, who released their first EP, The Redder, the Better, in May 2006 in conjunction with Luchador Records. The EP received rave reviews by webzines and made a number of year-end "best of" lists, topping the list on Australian radio Triple R's Bullying The Jukebox program. The success also garnered the band enough notice for Red Leader Records to sign them in July 2007. This EP is now out of print on CD, but has since been made available for digital download and on 12" vinyl.

=== Debut album and Bridge Nine (2008–2009) ===
The band's debut album, Sometimes Things Just Disappear, was released in March 2008, also receiving glowing reviews from an even wider number of webzines and great reception from their rapidly growing fanbase. More appearances in "best of" lists followed, as well as tours with The Gaslight Anthem, American Steel, Crime in Stereo, A Wilhelm Scream and Cancer Bats, leading to the band's signing to Bridge Nine Records, officially announced on January 8, 2009. Label owner Chris Wrenn said the following in regards to the bands signing:

We couldn't be more excited to add Polar Bear Club to the family. This was one of the best and easiest decisions we've made and it's a great way to start off 2009. Not only are they an incredible band, but they know who they are and what they want to be—and they fit in perfect perfectly with the way B9 is growing.

The label at the same time announced they would issue Sometimes Things Just Disappear on vinyl sometime during spring. On March 19 the vinyl was made available for pre-order, with a shipping start date set for March 24, even though its official release date was April 7.

=== Chasing Hamburg and Clash Battle Guilt Pride (2009–2012) ===
In February/March 2009, the band toured the UK and Europe with The Gaslight Anthem and Frank Turner, with a small string of UK headlining dates subsequent to the tour. During the European visit, they announced plans to return for a US tour with labelmates Have Heart. They also announced that they were to start work on their sophomore album, to be produced by Matt Bayles. The album, Chasing Hamburg, was released on September 8, 2009 by Bridge Nine Records on both 12" vinyl and CD.

On June 21, 2010 the Chasing Hamburg b-side "Drifting Thing (Team Goldie Remix)" was posted for exclusive streaming at AbsolutePunk.net and was released by Bridge 9 Records as a 7 inch record (limited to a pressing of 500) during their Fall 2010 Mystery Box Sale. On August 8, 2010, they played at the Hevy Music Festival held near Folkestone, Kent, England. On one of the early tour dates for The AP Fall Ball 2010, Polar Bear Club announced they would be taking the next six months after the tour's end to write and record a new album. They replaced Alesana on the 2011 Australian festival Soundwave. Whilst in Australia, the group also performed some select sideshows along acts such as Terror, Fucked Up, and H_{2}O.

The band's third album, Clash Battle Guilt Pride, was recorded with Brian McTernan at Salad Days Studio in Baltimore and released in September 2011. They embarked on a headline tour that fall with support from Fireworks, Balance and Composure, and Make Do and Mend. In March and April 2012, the band embarked on the Glamour Kills tour as direct support for The Wonder Years, alongside opening acts Transit, The Story So Far, A Loss For Words and Into It. Over It., before embarking on the entirety of the 2012 Vans Warped Tour. That year they also played the Lock Up stage at the Reading and Leeds Festivals. On July 31, 2012 they released their first live album, Live at the Montage. During their set opening for The Gaslight Anthem in Boston on November 26, 2012, the band announced that it was Nate Morris' last show with the band.

=== Death Chorus and hiatus (2013–2015) ===
On April 17, 2013, the band announced that their bassist Erik "Goose" Henning had decided to part ways with the band. In late February and early March, Polar Bear Club headed over to Australia as part of the Soundwave Festival, playing all five dates of the festival as well as club shows with All Time Low and Chunk! No, Captain Chunk!

In May and June 2013, the band toured the UK, playing Slam Dunk Festival as well as more intimate shows. At the last date of the tour at Camden Underworld in London, Jimmy Stadt outlined that the band would be in the studio recording the new album shortly after returning home from tour. On November 18, the band's fourth album, Death Chorus, was released on Rise Records, produced by Will Yip. Following the album's release, the band toured with Citizen, Sainthood Reps, and Diamond Youth in November and December 2013.

In May 2015, lead singer Jimmy Stadt confirmed via social media that the band is currently on hiatus.

== Other projects ==
Following his departure from Polar Bear Club, original guitarist Kevin Mahoney joined Hit the Lights. Since the breakup of Polar Bear Club, Jimmy Stadt and Nate Morris released formed Wax Bottles alongside Jasmyn Morris and Benny Horowitz, releasing a self-titled EP in 2017. Stadt has also played in Shy Tooth, who released the 3 Songs EP in 2019. Steve Port opened a School of Rock franchise in Fayetteville, New York in 2024.

== Band members ==
Final line-up

- Jimmy Stadt – lead vocals (2005–2015)
- Chris Browne – guitar, backing vocals (2005–2015)
- Steve Port – drums (2012–2015)
- Patrick Benson – guitar (2012–2015)
- Tyler Smith – bass (2013–2015)

Former members

- Kevin Mahoney – guitar (2005–2006)
- Nate Morris – guitar (2006–2012)
- Josh Dillon – bass (2005)
- Greg Odom – bass (2005–2008)
- Erik Michael "Goose" Henning – bass (2008–2013)
- Bob O'Neil – drums (2005–2006)
- Emmett Menke – drums (2006–2011)
- Tyler Mahurin – drums (2011–2012)

== Discography ==
- Sometimes Things Just Disappear (2008)
- Chasing Hamburg (2009)
- Clash Battle Guilt Pride (2011)
- Death Chorus (2013)
