= New Mexican Disaster Squad =

American hardcore punk band

- Origin: Orlando, Florida, United States
- Genres: Hardcore punk
- Years active: 1999–2008
- Labels: A-F Records, Breaker Breaker Records, No Idea, Jade Tree Records
- Members: Brian Wayne Etherington; Sam Johnson; Richard Minino; Alex Goldfarb
- Website: MySpace page

New Mexican Disaster Squad was an American hardcore punk band. It was formed in Orlando, Florida in 1999. Their last show was at the Fest 7 on November 1, 2008, though the band did reunite to play Radfest in North Carolina, May 2010.

The band's MySpace page describes their sound as "harken[ing] back to the glory days of American hardcore with equal influences from the east and west coasts".

They released four full-length albums, the last, Don't Believe (2006), on Jade Tree Records.

On December 28, 2008, a posting on the band's MySpace page announced that Goldfarb, Minino, and Johnson had joined with Tony Foresta, the vocalist from Municipal Waste, to form a band called No Friends.

Eight years later, Goldfarb, along with Chris Pfister, Chris Kretzer, and Zach Anderson formed a new Orlando punk-pop band, Debt Neglector. In August 2018, they released their first album on SmartPunk Records, Atomicland.

== Members ==
- Brian Wayne Etherington – Guitar, hat
- Sam Johnson – Vocals, guitar
- Richard Minino – Drums
- Alex Goldfarb – Bass guitar, vocals
- Matt Whitman - Bass guitar

== Discography ==
- "Weapons and Equipment of Counter Terrorism" 7" (1999)
- New Mexican Disaster Squad/Destination: Daybreak Split CD (2000) (Breaker Breaker Records)
- Abrasive Repulsive Disorder CD (2002) (Breaker Breaker Records)
- New Mexican Disaster Squad CD (2003) (A-F Records)
- New Mexican Disaster Squad / Western Addiction Split LP/CD (2004) (No Idea Records)
- Don't Believe CD (2006) (Jade Tree Records)
- Don't Believe LP (2006) (No Idea Records)
- Peace With Nothing EP Digital Download (2007) (Jade Tree Records)
- Peace With Nothing EP 7" USA (2007) (Kiss Of Death Records)
- Peace With Nothing EP 7" Europe (2007) (Rat Patrol Records)

== Other appearances ==
- "You're Incorrect" Take Action! Vol 4 (2004)
