= Against Me! discography =

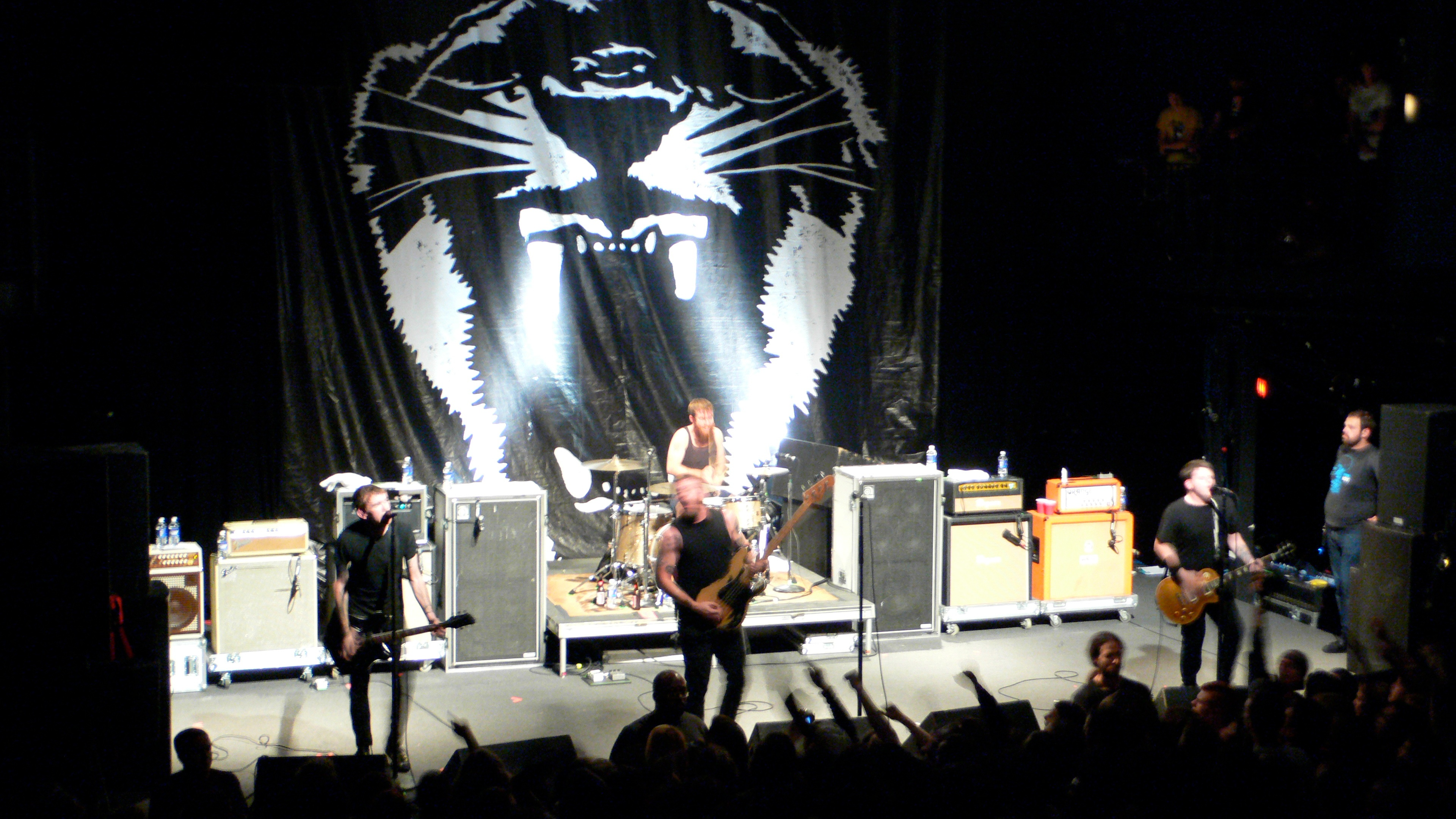
- Against Me! on tour in 2007 in support of New Wave.
- Studio albums: 7
- Live albums: 2
- Singles: 16
- Video albums: 2
- Music videos: 19
- Demo albums: 5
- Other appearances: 11

The discography of Gainesville, Florida-based punk rock band Against Me! consists of seven studio albums, four EPs, two live albums, two DVDs, fifteen singles, five demos, and sixteen music videos.

Against Me! was formed in 1997 as a solo act by singer/guitarist Laura Jane Grace (credited as Tom Gabel until 2012), occasionally performing with backing musicians. After releasing several demos and EPs the band released their debut studio album, Against Me! Is Reinventing Axl Rose, through No Idea Records. Their second album, 2003's Against Me! as the Eternal Cowboy, was released by Fat Wreck Chords. They followed this up with their third album Searching for a Former Clarity in 2005, which became their first album to chart on the Billboard 200. In 2007, Against Me! signed to Sire Records and released their fourth studio album New Wave, which debuted at no. 57 on the Billboard 200 and featured their first charting single, "Thrash Unreal". They released their fifth album White Crosses in 2010.

In 2011 the band launched their own record label, Total Treble Music. Their first full-length album under the label, Transgender Dysphoria Blues, was released in 2014, followed by Shape Shift with Me in 2016.

== Albums ==
=== Studio albums ===
List of studio albums, with selected information
| Title | Details | Peak chart positions | | | | | |
| Title | Details | US | US Alt | US Indie | US Rock | AUS | CAN |
|---|---|---|---|---|---|---|---|
| Against Me! Is Reinventing Axl Rose | Released: March 5, 2002; Label: No Idea (129); Format: CD, LP, cassette, digital download, streaming | — | — | — | — | — | — |
| Against Me! as the Eternal Cowboy | Released: November 4, 2003; Label: Fat Wreck Chords (FAT 667); Format: CD, LP, digital download, streaming | — | — | 36 | — | — | — |
| Searching for a Former Clarity | Released: September 6, 2005; Label: Fat Wreck Chords (FAT 684); Format: CD, LP, digital download, streaming | 114 | — | 9 | — | — | — |
| New Wave | Released: July 10, 2007; Label: Sire (SIRE 101304); Format: CD, LP, digital download, streaming | 57 | 20 | — | 21 | — | — |
| White Crosses | Released: June 8, 2010; Label: Sire; Format: CD, LP, digital download, streaming | 34 | 7 | — | 9 | — | 48 |
| Transgender Dysphoria Blues | Released: January 21, 2014; Label: Total Treble Music; Format: CD, LP, (Note: The original pressing of the Transgender Dysphoria Blues vinyl LP is 12" 33⅓ RPM. The 10th anniversary pressing is 12" 45 RPM.) digital download, streaming | 23 | 5 | 2 | 6 | 89 | — |
| Shape Shift with Me | Released: September 16, 2016; Label: Total Treble Music; Format: CD, LP, digital download, streaming | 80 | 6 | 5 | 10 | 61 | 72 |
"—" denotes albums that were released but did not chart.

=== Live albums ===
List of live albums, with selected information
| Title | Details | Peak chart positions | | |
| Title | Details | US Heat | US Indie | US Rock |
|---|---|---|---|---|
| Americans Abroad! Against Me! Live in London! | Released: August 22, 2006; Label: Fat Wreck Chords (FAT 716); Format: LP, CD, digital download, streaming | 38 | 41 | 48 |
| 23 Live Sex Acts | Released: September 4, 2015; Label: Total Treble Music; Format: LP, CD, digital download, streaming | — | 27 | — |

=== Video albums ===
List of video albums, with selected information
| Title | Details |
|---|---|
| We're Never Going Home | Released: November 2, 2004; Label: Fat Wreck Chords (FAT 679); Formats: DVD |
| Live at the Key Club | Released: 2007; Label: Sire; Formats: DVD |

=== Demo albums ===
List of demo albums, with selected information
| Title | Details |
|---|---|
| Against Me! | Released: 1997; Label: self-released; Format: cassette |
| Vivida Vis! | Released: 1998; Label: Misanthrope; Format: Cassette |
| The Original Cowboy | Released: July 7, 2009; Label: Fat Wreck Chords (FAT 743); Format: LP, CD, digital download, streaming |
| Total Clarity | Released: May 24, 2011; Label: Fat Wreck Chords; Format: LP, CD, digital download, streaming |
| Black Crosses | Released: July 26, 2011; Label: Total Treble Music; Format: LP, CD, digital download, streaming |

== Extended plays ==
List of extended plays, with selected information
| Title | Details |
|---|---|
| Against Me! | Released: May 2000; Label: Crasshole; Format: Vinyl |
| Crime as Forgiven by Against Me! | Released: March 1, 2001; Label: Sabot Productions (001) / Plan-It-X; Format: Vinyl, CD |
| Against Me! | Released: November 2001; Label: Sabot Productions (002); Format: Vinyl, CD |
| New Wave B-Sides | Released: July 29, 2008; Label: Sire; Format: Digital download, streaming |

== Singles ==
List of singles, with selected information
| Title | Year | Peak chart positions | | | | | | Album |
| Title | Year | US Sales | US Rock | CAN | CAN Rock | CZ Rock | MEX Air. | Album |
|---|---|---|---|---|---|---|---|---|
| "The Disco Before the Breakdown" | 2002 | — | — | — | — | — | — | Non-album single |
| "Cavalier Eternal" | 2004 | — | — | — | — | — | — | Against Me! as the Eternal Cowboy |
| "Sink, Florida, Sink" | 2005 | — | — | — | — | — | — | Against Me! as the Eternal Cowboy |
| "Don't Lose Touch" | 2005 | — | — | — | — | — | — | Searching for a Former Clarity |
| "From Her Lips to God's Ears (The Energizer)" | 2006 | — | — | — | — | — | — | Searching for a Former Clarity |
| "White People for Peace" | 2007 | — | — | — | — | — | — | New Wave |
| "Thrash Unreal" | 2007 | — | — (Note: "Trash Unreal" did not enter the Hot Rock & Alternative Songs chart but peaked at number 11 on the Alternative Airplay chart.) | 51 | 3 | — | — | New Wave |
| "Stop!" | 2008 | — | — (Note: "Stop!" did not enter the Hot Rock & Alternative Songs chart but peaked at number 27 on the Alternative Airplay chart.) | 78 | 8 | — | — | New Wave |
| "New Wave" | 2008 | — | — | — | — | — | — | New Wave |
| "I Was a Teenage Anarchist" | 2010 | 22 | 31 | 66 | 1 | 5 | 48 | White Crosses |
| "High Pressure Low" | 2010 | — | — | — | — | — | — | White Crosses |
| "Russian Spies / Occult Enemies" | 2011 | — | — | — | — | — | — | Non-album single |
| "True Trans" | 2013 | — | — | — | — | — | — | Transgender Dysphoria Blues |
| "Unconditional Love" | 2014 | 5 | — | — | — | — | — | Transgender Dysphoria Blues |
| "Osama bin Laden as the Crucified Christ" | 2015 | — | — | — | — | — | — | Transgender Dysphoria Blues |
| "Stabitha Christie / First High of the Morning" | 2017 | — | — | — | — | — | — | Non-album single |
"—" denotes singles that were released but did not chart.

== Other charted songs ==
| Title | Year | Peak chart positions | Album |
| Title | Year | CAN Rock | Album |
|---|---|---|---|
| "Black Me Out" | 2014 | 18 | Transgender Dysphoria Blues |

== Music videos ==
| Year | Title | Director | Album |
|---|---|---|---|
| 2003 | "Turn Those Clapping Hands Into Angry Balled Fists" | | As the Eternal Cowboy |
| 2005 | "Don't Lose Touch" | Philip Andelman | Searching for a Former Clarity |
| 2006 | "From Her Lips to God's Ears (The Energizer)" | AAB | Searching for a Former Clarity |
| 2006 | "Problems" | Blair Young | Searching for a Former Clarity |
| 2007 | "White People for Peace" | Adam Egypt Mortimer | New Wave |
| 2007 | "Thrash Unreal" | Adam Egypt Mortimer | New Wave |
| 2008 | "Stop!" | Marc Klasfeld (Marc Klasfeld version) / Justin Staggs | New Wave |
| 2008 | "New Wave" | Justin Staggs | New Wave |
| 2008 | "Borne on the FM Waves of the Heart" | | New Wave |
| 2010 | "Rapid Decompression" | Vern Moen | White Crosses |
| 2010 | "I Was a Teenage Anarchist" | Marc Klasfield | White Crosses |
| 2011 | "Spanish Moss" | Andrew Seward | White Crosses |
| 2011 | "Because of the Shame" | Jason Thrasher | White Crosses |
| 2014 | "FUCKMYLIFE666" | Joshua Mikel | Transgender Dysphoria Blues |
| 2014 | "Black Me Out" | Joshua Mikel | Transgender Dysphoria Blues |
| 2014 | "Drinking with the Jocks" | Steak Mtn | Transgender Dysphoria Blues |
| 2015 | "True Trans Soul Rebel" | Steak Mtn | Transgender Dysphoria Blues |
| 2015 | "Cliché Guevara" (live version) | Steak Mtn | 23 Live Sex Acts |
| 2016 | "Crash" | Laura Jane Grace, Jason Thrasher | Shape Shift with Me |
| 2016 | "333" | Ione Skye | Shape Shift with Me |
| 2017 | "Haunting, Haunted, Haunts" | Margherita Ballarin | Shape Shift with Me |

== Other appearances ==
The following Against Me! songs were released on compilation albums, soundtracks, and other releases. This is not an exhaustive list; songs that were first released on the band's albums, EPs, or singles are not included.

| Year | Release details | Track(s) |
|---|---|---|
| 1998 | We're Here to Ruin Your Fun: Released: 1998; Label: Crasshole; Format: CS | "National Myth"; "Burning Bridges" |
| 2004 | Rock Against Bush, Vol. 1: Released: April 20, 2004; Label: Fat Wreck Chords (FAT 675); Format: CD | "Sink, Florida, Sink" (electric) |
| 2004 | Take Action! Volume 04: Released: October 5, 2004; Label: Sub City (SC 028); Format: CD | "You Look Like I Need a Drink" (acoustic) |
| 2005 | Protect: A Benefit for the National Association to Protect Children: Released: October 18, 2005; Label: Fat Wreck Chords (FAT 697); Format: CD | "Wagon Wheel" (originally performed by the Old Crow Medicine Show) |
| 2006 | We'll Inherit the Earth: A Tribute to The Replacements: Released: October 3, 2006; Label: 1234 Go!; Format: CD | "Bastards of Young" (originally performed by The Replacements) |
| 2006 | Shine Some Light: A Benefit for Dan Lang-Gunn: Released: July 28, 2006; Label: Asbestos; Format: CD | "Don't Lose Touch" (live on WCSU) |
| 2006 | Remember Your Roots: Released: 2006; Label: Twelve Stepper; Format: CD | "Take Aim"; "Clap Clap" |
| 2006 | Fat X-Mas Bonus: Released: 2006; Label: Fat Wreck Chords; Format: digital download | "Don't Lose Touch" (acoustic) |
| 2009 | Covered, A Revolution in Sound: Released: March 10, 2009; Label: Warner Bros. (512896); Format: CD | "Here Comes a Regular" (originally performed by The Replacements) |
| 2017 | Hugs for Chelsea: Released: May 17, 2017; Compiled by Evan Greer; Format: Digital | "ProVision L-3" (#Resist version) |
| 2018 | Songs That Saved My Life: Released: November 9, 2018; Label: Hopeless Records; Format: CD, Vinyl, Digital | "People Who Died" (originally performed by The Jim Carroll Band) |
