= 23 Live Sex Acts =

Live album by Against Me!
- Released: September 4, 2015
- Recorded: February 29, 2014 (fictional)
- Venue: The Gritty Clit, Kiev, Indiana (fictional)
- Genre: Punk rock
- Length: 86:11
- Label: Total Treble Music

Against Me! chronology
| Transgender Dysphoria Blues (2014) | 23 Live Sex Acts (2015) | Shape Shift with Me (2016) |

Professional ratings
Review scores
| Source | Rating |
|---|---|
| Consequence of Sound | B |
| PunkNews.org | 4.5/5 stars |
| Rolling Stone | 3/5 stars |

23 Live Sex Acts (also referred to as Against Me! and the 23 Live Sex Acts) is the second live album by Against Me! It was recorded on the 2014 tour for their sixth studio album, Transgender Dysphoria Blues and released in 2015.

== Track listing ==
All lyrics are written by Laura Jane Grace; all music is composed by Laura Jane Grace, except where noted.

| No. | Title | Length |
|---|---|---|
| 1. | "FUCKMYLIFE666" | 3:50 |
| 2. | "Pints of Guinness Make You Strong" | 2:59 |
| 3. | "Cliché Guevara" (music by Laura Jane Grace, James Bowman, Warren Oakes, Andrew Seward) | 2:24 |
| 4. | "True Trans Soul Rebel" | 3:51 |
| 5. | "I Was a Teenage Anarchist" | 3:54 |
| 6. | "New Wave" | 2:46 |
| 7. | "Walking Is Still Honest" | 2:32 |
| 8. | "Turn Those Clapping Hands into Angry Balled Fists" | 5:51 |
| 9. | "Transgender Dysphoria Blues" | 3:26 |
| 10. | "Pretty Girls (The Mover)" | 3:13 |
| 11. | "I Still Love You Julie" | 3:06 |
| 12. | "High Pressure Low" | 4:07 |
| 13. | "Don't Lose Touch" (music by Grace, Bowman, Oakes, Seward) | 3:19 |
| 14. | "Miami" | 4:12 |
| 15. | "White Crosses" | 4:05 |
| 16. | "Osama bin Laden as the Crucified Christ" | 3:16 |
| 17. | "How Low" | 4:02 |
| 18. | "Black Me Out" | 3:07 |
| 19. | "Thrash Unreal" | 4:31 |
| 20. | "Unconditional Love" | 2:50 |
| 21. | "The Ocean" | 8:35 |
| 22. | "Sink, Florida, Sink" | 2:24 |
| 23. | "We Laugh at Danger and Break All the Rules" (music by Grace, Bowman, Oakes) | 3:51 |
| Total length: | | 86:11 |

== Personnel ==
- Laura Jane Grace – guitar, lead vocals
- James Bowman – guitar, backing vocals
- Inge Johansson – bass guitar, backing vocals
- Atom Willard – drums
