= Against Me! (disambiguation) =

Against Me! is an American punk rock band.

Against Me! may also refer to their albums:

- Against Me! (demo), 1997
- Against Me! (2000 EP)
- Against Me! (2001 EP)
