= Osama bin Laden as the Crucified Christ =

Single by Against Me!

from the album Transgender Dysphoria Blues
- Released: April 18, 2015
- Recorded: On location, 2014 ("Side A"); Total Treble Studios, Elkton, Florida in 2013 & Rancho Record, Michigan in 2014 ("Side B")
- Genre: Punk rock
- Length: 5:54
- Label: Total Treble Music
- Songwriter: Laura Jane Grace
- Producer: Against Me!

Against Me! singles chronology
"Unconditional Love" (2014)	"Osama bin Laden as the Crucified Christ" (2015)	"333" (2017)

"Osama bin Laden as the Crucified Christ" is a single from Against Me!, released on 7" coloured vinyl on April 18, 2015, on Total Treble Music, as a limited edition for Record Store Day 2015. The track, which originally appeared on the 2014 album Transgender Dysphoria Blues, appears in two versions: a live version, from 23 Live Sex Acts, and an exclusive alternate version referred to as the "extra dysphoric version" performed solely by frontwoman Laura Jane Grace.

== Background ==
The single was released as a limited-edition 7" single for Record Store Day. The song, before its album was released in 2014, was first played in January 2012 at Slamdance Film Festival. As the title suggests, the song refers to the crucifixion of Jesus Christ and the death of Osama bin Laden in 2011. The lyrics also refer to executions of Benito Mussolini and his mistress Claretta "Clara" Petacci, as well as the public display of their corpses in Piazzale Loreto, in 1945.

== Track listing ==
All tracks are written by Laura Jane Grace.

No.	Title	Length
1.	"Osama bin Laden as the Crucified Christ" (live version)	2:57
2.	"Osama bin Laden as the Crucified Christ" ("extra dysphoric" version)	2:57
Total length:		5:54

== Personnel ==
=== Band ===
- Laura Jane Grace – lead vocals, guitar, art direction, producer, recording engineer
- James Bowman – guitar, backing vocals (track 1)
- Inge Johansson – bass, backing vocals (track 1)
- Atom Willard – drums, percussion (track 1)

=== Production ===
- Pete Matthews – recording engineer (track 2)
- Marc Hudson – mixing engineer, recording engineer (track 2)
- Mike Zirkel – mastering

=== Art and design ===
- Christopher Norris – art direction
- Steak Mtn – design, typography, and illustration

== See also ==
- Against Me! discography
