= Unconditional Love (Against Me! song) =

Single by Against Me!

from the album Transgender Dysphoria Blues
- Released: May 26, 2014
- Recorded: Various studios, 2012/13 ("Unconditional Love"); Michigan, March 2014 ("500 Years")
- Genre: Punk rock
- Length: 6:26
- Label: Total Treble Music
- Songwriter: Laura Jane Grace
- Producer: Against Me!

Against Me! singles chronology
"True Trans" (2013)	"Unconditional Love" (2014)	"Osama bin Laden as the Crucified Christ" (2015)

"Unconditional Love" is a single from Against Me!, released on a 7" picture disc on May 26, 2014, on Total Treble Music, with a digital release on June 9.

== Background ==
The title track appears as the third track on Against Me!'s sixth studio album, Transgender Dysphoria Blues, while the b-side is a newly recorded song, "500 Years", which was played live (albeit in acoustic form) by Laura Jane Grace in 2012.

== Track listing ==
All lyrics are written by Laura Jane Grace; all music is composed by Against Me!.

Digital Single
No.	Title	Length
1.	"Unconditional Love"	2:52
2.	"500 Years"	3:35

== Personnel ==
=== Band ===
- Laura Jane Grace – lead vocals, guitar, bass (track 2), producer
- James Bowman – guitar, backing vocals
- Atom Willard – drums, percussion

=== Additional musicians ===
- Fat Mike – bass (track 1)

== See also ==
- Against Me! discography
