= Russian Spies / Occult Enemies =

"Russian Spies" / "Occult Enemies"

Single by Against Me!
- Released: June 14, 2011
- Recorded: February 14–21, 2011
- Studio: Smart Studios, Madison, Wisconsin
- Genre: Punk rock
- Length: 5:14
- Label: Sabot Productions
- Songwriter: Laura Jane Grace
- Producers: Against Me!, Mike Zirkel

Against Me! singles chronology
"High Pressure Low" (2010)	"Russian Spies" / "Occult Enemies" (2011)	"True Trans" (2013)

"Russian Spies" / "Occult Enemies" is a single from Against Me!, released as a 7" vinyl single on June 14, 2011 on Sabot Productions. This is the last Against Me! release to feature Laura Jane Grace before her transition. "Occult Enemies" is featured on the soundtrack of NHL 12.

== Background ==
After Against Me!'s break in late 2010, the band returned with a new drummer, Jay Weinberg. Laura Jane Grace said in early 2011 in many interviews that the band intended to release an EP or 7" before summer 2011, after "kicking around" a few songs that did not necessarily feel like tracks for a sixth studio album. Prior to their March 2011 tour with Dropkick Murphys, the band spent time off tour in Madison, Wisconsin recording at a studio owned by Butch Vig.

== Track listing ==
All lyrics are written by Laura Jane Grace; all music is composed by Against Me!.

7" Vinyl Single
No.	Title	Length
1.	"Russian Spies"	2:37
2.	"Occult Enemies"	2:37

== Personnel ==
=== Band ===
- Laura Jane Grace – guitar, lead vocals
- James Bowman – guitar, backing vocals
- Andrew Seward – bass guitar, backing vocals
- Jay Weinberg – drums

=== Production ===
- Mike Zirkel – recording engineer and mixing
- Rob Halstead – assistant engineer
- Emily Lazar and Joe LaPorta – mastering

=== Art and design ===
- Steak Mtn. – art direction, design, typography, and illustration
- Ryan Russell – band photography

== See also ==
- Against Me! discography
