= The Disco Before the Breakdown =

Single by Against Me!
- A-side: "The Disco Before the Breakdown"
- B-side: "Tonight We're Gonna Give It 35%"; "Beginning in an Ending"
- Released: November 2002
- Recorded: July 28 and 31, 2002
- Studio: The Rec Room in Gainesville, Florida
- Genre: Punk rock, Ska punk
- Length: 8:57
- Label: No Idea (137)
- Songwriter: Laura Jane Grace
- Producers: Derron Nuhfter and Against Me!

Against Me! singles chronology
"The Disco Before the Breakdown" (2002)	"Cavalier Eternal" (2004)

"The Disco Before the Breakdown" is the first single by the Gainesville, Florida-based punk rock band Against Me!, released in November 2002 by No Idea Records. It was the band's first release with bassist Andrew Seward, replacing original bassist Dustin Fridkin who had left the group several months prior. The lineup of Seward, Laura Jane Grace, James Bowman, and Warren Oakes would remain in place until 2009. The single was released as both a vinyl 7" and a compact disc. It is a maxi single containing three songs.

== Critical reception ==
Reviewing "The Disco Before the Breakdown", Corey Apar of Allmusic gave it two out of five stars, calling it "A tolerable set of songs with personal lyrics, but with the exception of the relatively upbeat and horn-friendly title track, this EP is missing some of the group's standard energetic and reckless vigor; instead, listeners are left with a slight feeling of boredom."

== Track listing ==
All tracks are written by Laura Jane Grace.

No.	Title	Length
1.	"The Disco Before the Breakdown"	3:06
2.	"Tonight We're Gonna Give It 35%"	3:25
3.	"Beginning in an Ending"	2:47
Total length:		8:57

== Personnel ==
Against Me!

- Laura Jane Grace – guitar, lead vocals, art concepts and layout
- James Bowman – guitar, backing vocals
- Andrew Seward – bass guitar, backing vocals
- Warren Oakes – drums

Additional musicians

- Brian Pettit – backing vocals and horns on "The Disco Before the Breakdown"
- Patrick and Ryan Quinney, Samantha Jones, Todd Weissfeld, and Var Thelin – backing vocals on "The Disco Before the Breakdown"
- Jessica Mills – horns on "The Disco Before the Breakdown"
- Derron Nuhfter – producer, horns on "The Disco Before the Breakdown"

== See also ==
- Against Me! discography
