= 333 (song) =

2016 song performed by Against Me!

Single by Against Me!

from the album Shape Shift with Me
- Released: July 18, 2016
- Recorded: 2015
- Genre: Punk rock
- Length: 3:17
- Label: Total Treble Music
- Songwriters: Laura Jane Grace, James Bowman, Atom Willard, Inge Johansson
- Producer: Against Me!

Against Me! singles chronology
"Osama bin Laden as the Crucified Christ" (2015)	"333" (2016)	"Haunting, Haunted, Haunts" (2016)

"333" is a song by the punk rock band Against Me!. It was released in July 2016 as the first of three pre-release singles from the band's seventh album Shape Shift with Me.

The song was written on the band's European tour in 2015, after a visit to The Guggenheim art museum in Bilbao, Spain. Lyrics in the song make reference to various artworks there in 2015, including One Hundred and Fifty Multicolored Marilyns, The Renowned Orders of the Night and Tarot Garden.

== Music video ==
A music video for the song was released on September 2, 2016. It was directed by Ione Skye (wife of friend of the band Ben Lee) and stars actors Natasha Lyonne and Andrew Howard.

== Personnel ==
- Laura Jane Grace – guitar, vocals
- James Bowman – guitar, backing vocals
- Inge Johansson – bass guitar, backing vocals
- Atom Willard – drums, percussion
