= We're Never Going Home =

Video by Against Me!
- Released: November 2, 2004
- Recorded: April–May 2004
- Genre: Punk rock
- Length: 60:00
- Label: Fat Wreck Chords (FAT 679)
- Director: Jake Burghart

Against Me! chronology
Against Me! as the Eternal Cowboy (2003)	We're Never Going Home (2004)	Searching for a Former Clarity (2005)

We're Never Going Home is the first DVD release of the Gainesville, Florida folk punk band Against Me!, produced by Jake Burghart and presented by Fat Wreck Chords. The feature presentation of the DVD follows the band on their United States tour that spanned from April 1 to May 2 of 2004 and also featured the hardcore punk band Planes Mistaken for Stars and the punk band No Choice.

Jake Burghart focuses on the relentless pressure on the band coming from major record companies that had been looking to produce the band's then-upcoming album as the band struggled to decide what steps to take. With the release of the widely successful As the Eternal Cowboy (2003) on Fat Wreck Chords the prior year, various record companies (named in the film, among them Warner Bros. Records) took notice of the commercial potential of the band and, as illustrated in the DVD, took to wining and dining with "Against Me!". Oppositely, the film features brief interviews from those who oppose the band's signing to larger labels on DIY and anarchist principles, including a pair of interviews from DIY folk punk band Ghost Mice. The interviews from both sides offer insight into what pressures faced the band and shed light on the moral dilemma that confused and frustrated the band.

During an interview with Fat Mike from Fat Wreck Chords in this documentary, he explained that his label offered the band a certain amount of money with their deal, which they accepted. Despite the pitches from major labels and the ensuing deliberation, the band was already obligated with that deal to release their next album with Fat Wreck. This album was Searching for a Former Clarity (2005). They then signed to Sire Records three months after the release of Searching for a Former Clarity.

The film illustrates the classic life of a rock band on tour, with the band and friends pulling pranks and spending the month drunk. However, as Laura Jane Grace indicates in a statement on the back of the DVD case, "this isn't meant to be a representation of who we are as people. Just who we were right then."

Musically, the DVD contains live performances from the tour, with songs spanning their musical career. The extra features include many performances that were not a part of the feature presentation, including some older footage.

The black and white photo on the cover of the DVD captures lead singer, Laura Jane Grace, and bassist, Andrew Seward, in the middle of a "high-five" while playing live at the 9:30 Club, in Washington D.C., on January 20, 2004. The photograph was captured by photographer and band tour manager, Bryan K. Wynacht.

== Track listing ==
All tracks are written by Laura Jane Grace.

No.	Title	Length
1.	"Cliché Guevara"
2.	"Walking Is Still Honest"
3.	"Problems"
4.	"Reinventing Axl Rose"	2:13
5.	"Rice and Bread"	2:15
6.	"Sink, Florida, Sink"	2:07
7.	"Turn Those Clapping Hands Into Angry Balled Fists"	5:00
8.	"Those Anarcho Punks Are Mysterious"	2:08
9.	"You Look Like I Need A Drink"	2:12
10.	"Baby, I'm An Anarchist!"	2:23
11.	"We Laugh at Danger and Break All the Rules"	3:47
12.	"Joy"	1:14

Extras
No.	Title	Length
13.	"Pints of Guinness Make You Strong"
14.	"Shit Stroll (Nah Nah Nah)"	2:32
15.	"Impact"	1:31
16.	"TSR"	2:29
17.	""New Song" (at the time untitled; appears on Total Clarity as "Exhaustion and Disgust")"	2:34
18.	"I Still Love You Julie"	3:09

== Personnel ==
Editing / Graphics by Jake Burghart Cover Photography and Photo Gallery by Bryan Wynacht Music by Against Me!, Lucero, No Choice, Planes Mistaken for Stars, None More Black.

Starring: Bryan Wynacht, Andrew Seward, James Bowman, Warren Oakes, Laura Jane Grace, Jon Gerhardt, Jordan Kleeman,
