= High Pressure Low =

Single by Against Me!

from the album White Crosses
- Released: December 21, 2010
- Recorded: February 2010
- Studio: Crescendo Sound Studios, Gainesville, Florida
- Genre: Folk punk
- Length: 6:56
- Label: Sabot Productions
- Songwriter: Laura Jane Grace
- Producer: Against Me!

Against Me! singles chronology
"White Crosses" (2010)	"High Pressure Low" (2010)	"Russian Spies / Occult Enemies" (2011)

"High Pressure Low" is the third single from Against Me!'s fifth studio album White Crosses, released as a 7" vinyl single on December 21, 2010 on Sabot Productions.

== Background ==
Following the recording of their fifth studio album, White Crosses, Against Me! recorded acoustic versions of songs written for the album in February 2010. An acoustic version of "High Pressure Low" was known to be recorded following lead singer Laura Jane Grace's video posts regarding the acoustic sessions. Grace performed the B-side, "Strip Mall Parking Lots" as early as her 2008 solo tour, then thought to be called "Southwest Florida Sunset".

== Track listing ==
All lyrics are written by Laura Jane Grace; all music is composed by Against Me!.

7" Vinyl Single
No.	Title	Length
1.	"High Pressure Low" (acoustic)	4:23
2.	"Strip Mall Parking Lots" (acoustic)	2:34

== Personnel ==
=== Band ===
- Laura Jane Grace – guitar, lead vocals, backing vocals
- James Bowman – guitar, backing vocals
- Andrew Seward – bass guitar, backing vocals
- George Rebelo – drums, backing vocals, backing instruments

=== Production ===
- Produced and mixed by Against Me!
- Recorded by Derron Nuhfer

== See also ==
- Against Me! discography
