= Heart Burns =

EP by Laura Jane Grace
- Released: October 28, 2008
- Recorded: 2008
- Genres: Folk rock; punk rock
- Length: 21:16
- Label: Sire Records
- Producers: Laura Jane Grace; Billy Bush; Butch Vig

Laura Jane Grace chronology
Heart Burns (2008)	Bought to Rot (2018)

Professional ratings
Review scores
Source	Rating
AbsolutePunk.net	(86%) link
Aversion.com	link
ChartAttack	link
The Milk Carton	(A−) link
Punknews.org	link
Spin	link
Stereokill	link
Punkdisasters.com	link

Heart Burns is the debut solo extended play by American singer-songwriter Laura Jane Grace, released under her birth name. It was released October 28, 2008 on Sire Records.

== Track listing ==
All tracks are written by Laura Jane Grace.

No.	Title	Length
1.	"Random Hearts"	3:23
2.	"Conceptual Paths"	3:18
3.	"Cowards Sing at Night"	2:06
4.	"Amputations"	2:04
5.	"Anna Is a Stool Pigeon"	4:27
6.	"Harsh Realms"	2:41
7.	"100 Years of War"	3:21
Total length:		21:16

iTunes edition bonus tracks
No.	Title	Length
8.	"Random Hearts" (acoustic)	3:16
9.	"I Can't See You, But I Know You're There"	3:12
Total length:		27:44

== Personnel ==
- Laura Jane Grace – lead and backing vocals, lead and rhythm guitar, bass guitar, drums
- Chuck Ragan – background vocals and harmonica on "Anna Is a Stool Pigeon"
- Matt Skiba – background vocals on "Amputations"
- Butch Vig – drums on "Anna Is a Stool Pigeon"
