= Adventure Club (album) =

Studio album by Laura Jane Grace in the Trauma Tropes
- Released: July 18, 2025
- Genre: Punk rock
- Length: 28:47
- Label: Polyvinyl
- Producers: Laura Jane Grace; Jacopo Fokas

Laura Jane Grace chronology
Give an Inch (2024)	Adventure Club (2025)

Adventure Club is the fourth studio album by American singer-songwriter Laura Jane Grace, released on July 18, 2025, through Polyvinyl Record Co..

== Critical reception ==
Professional ratings
Review scores
Source	Rating
Pitchfork	6.8/10

Pitchfork gave Adventure Club a 6.8/10 rating.

== Controversy ==
Her performance of the song "Your God (God's Dick)", which was released on Adventure Club, created controversy, as right-wing commentators and news outlets described the song as "anti-Christian". In response, Grace defended herself and the song's message, stating, "That song is the most relevant song I have right now to everything that's going on." The song was performed in protest to "president Donald Trump and Republican lawmakers’ proposed plans to cut federal programs like Medicare and Medicaid that low-income families rely on."

== Track listing ==
All tracks are written by Laura Jane Grace, except 2 and 3 (L. Grace, Paris Campbell Grace), 9 (L. Grace, Orestis Lagadinos), 10 (L. Grace, Jacopo Fokas), and 12 (lyrics by Constantine P. Cavafy; music and additional lyrics by L. Grace).

No.	Title	Length
1.	"WWIII Revisited"	1:24
2.	"Wearing Black"	3:00
3.	"I Love to Get High"	2:39
4.	"Active Trauma"	1:49
5.	"New Years Day"	2:35
6.	"Mine Me Mine"	1:37
7.	"Your God (God's Dick)"	2:07
8.	"Fuck You Harry Potter"	2:46
9.	"Poison in Me"	2:57
10.	"Espresso Freddie"	2:08
11.	"Free Cigarettes"	2:20
12.	"Walls"	3:25
Total length:		28:47

- "Walls" features an adaptation and lyrical expansion by Laura Jane Grace of the poem "Walls" by Constantine P. Cavafy.

== Personnel ==
Credits are adapted from the album's liner notes.

Musicians

- Laura Jane Grace – vocals, guitar, baglamas (uncredited) on "Your God (God's Dick)," production
- Paris Campbell Grace – backing vocals
- Jacopo "Jack" Fokas – bass, backing vocals, production, engineering, mixing
- Orestis Lagadinos – drums, backing vocals
- Christina Blioumpa – backing vocals
- Georgia Kollyra – backing vocals

Technical

- Marios Adamopoulos – additional engineering
- Konstantinos Ragiadakos – additional engineering
- Jason Livermore – mastering
- Christos Sarris – executive producer
