= True Trans =

Single by Against Me!

from the album Transgender Dysphoria Blues
- Released: July 12, 2013
- Genre: Folk punk
- Length: 6:08
- Label: Total Treble Music
- Songwriter: Laura Jane Grace
- Producer: Against Me!

Against Me! singles chronology
"Russian Spies / Occult Enemies" (2011)	"True Trans" (2013)	"Unconditional Love" (2014)

True Trans is an acoustic EP by American punk rock band Against Me!. The band released it as a digital single on July 12, 2013 through their label, Total Treble Music. The two songs on the EP were made available via an email download link to those who preordered tickets for Laura Jane Grace's August 2013 tour of the U.S. East Coast. It was later distributed as a 7".

The EP was released for free, for a limited time, on Against Me!'s website on July 15, 2013.

== Background ==
The EP features acoustic versions of two songs from the band's sixth studio album, Transgender Dysphoria Blues, which was released in early 2014. The song "True Trans Soul Rebel" has been played at live shows since May 30, 2012.

The album cover depicts Jame "Buffalo Bill" Gumb (Ted Levine) from the 1991 film The Silence of the Lambs, who is a male serial killer often wrongly described as transgender.

== Track listing ==
All lyrics are written by Laura Jane Grace; all music is composed by Against Me!.

EP
No.	Title	Length
1.	"FUCKMYLIFE666" (acoustic version)	2:53
2.	"True Trans Soul Rebel" (acoustic version)	3:15

== Personnel ==
- Laura Jane Grace – guitar, vocals

=== Art and design ===
- Steak Mtn. – art direction, design, typography, and illustration

== See also ==
- Against Me! discography
