= Transgender Dysphoria Blues =

Studio album by Against Me!
- Released: January 21, 2014
- Recorded: Total Treble Studios, Elkton, Florida; Studio 606, Los Angeles, California; Earthsound Recording, Valdosta, Georgia; Motor Studios, San Francisco, California
- Genres: Punk rock; punk metal; melodic punk; arena rock; rock n roll; glam punk
- Length: 28:43
- Labels: Total Treble (international); Xtra Mile (Europe)
- Producer: Laura Jane Grace

Against Me! chronology
Black Crosses (2011)	Transgender Dysphoria Blues (2014)	23 Live Sex Acts (2015)

Singles from Transgender Dysphoria Blues
- 1. "True Trans" Released: July 12, 2013; 2. "Unconditional Love" Released: May 26, 2014; 3. "Osama bin Laden as the Crucified Christ" Released: April 18, 2015

Hype sticker cover
- Censored version on the hype sticker

Transgender Dysphoria Blues is the sixth studio album by American punk rock band Against Me!, released on January 21, 2014, by Total Treble Music and Xtra Mile Recordings. The album deals with gender dysphoria, following Laura Jane Grace's gender transition and coming out.

== Recording and production ==
The band Against Me! first announced work on a new album in November 2011. The first sessions for the album were a false start, where the band started recording some basic tracks and then went on tour, and decided to scrap and start over when they got back from tour. Then, the record was completely recorded except for vocals when drummer Jay Weinberg quit the band. The band first tried to have fill-in drummer Atom Willard record drum tracks to match the previously recorded tracks, but it wasn't working. Starting from scratch, the band began recording the album a final time at Studio 606 in February 2013. In May 2013, long-time bassist Andrew Seward also left the band. A month later, Fat Mike of NOFX joined the band in the studio, playing on three songs, two of which appear on the album. That same month, tracking for the album was completed.

== Commercial performance ==
The album debuted on the Billboard 200 at No. 23, their highest debut yet on the chart. It also debuted at No. 6 on the Top Rock Albums chart, with 10,000 copies sold in its first week. It has sold 45,000 copies in the United States as of August 2016.

== Critical reception ==
Professional ratings
Aggregate scores
Source	Rating
AnyDecentMusic?	7.8/10
Metacritic	82/100
Review scores
Source	Rating
AllMusic	4.5/5 stars
The A.V. Club	B+
Chicago Tribune	3.5/4 stars
Entertainment Weekly	B
The Guardian	4/5 stars
NME	7/10
Pitchfork	7.5/10
Q	4/5 stars
Rolling Stone	3.5/5 stars
Spin	8/10

According to the review aggregator Metacritic, Transgender Dysphoria Blues received "universal acclaim" based on a weighted average score of 82 out of 100 from 28 critic scores. In his review for Now Magazine, Joshua Kloke described the record as having "career-defining clarity" and "increased confidence," writing that lead singer Laura Jane Grace "looks inward and employs conviction unheard since their 2002 debut, Reinventing Axl Rose." Will Hermes of Rolling Stone rated the album three-and-a-half stars out of five, and called it "A series of bracing songs about a self-destructive girl in a boy's body, it's a thematic offspring of Lou Reed (see Berlin, etc.)", and noted how "it takes balls to come out this way, in this genre" wishing Grace "God-speed, sister." Also, Hermes said that the album musically "sticks to the band's established brand of warrior-cry punk metal", and this "limits the range of what might be an ever braver new world, one glimpsed on the softer acoustic 'Two Coffins.'" Dan Weiss of Spin called the album "one of the most fascinating records of the year," rating it eight out of ten.

In 2019, Loudwire ranked the album 23 in their "66 best rock albums of the decade."

=== Accolades ===
Year-end rankings

Publication	Rank	List
American Songwriter	20	Top 50 Albums of 2014
Consequence of Sound	6	Top 50 Albums of 2014
Noisey	2	Top 25 Albums of 2014
PopMatters	6	The 80 Best Albums of 2014
Rolling Stone	15	50 Best Albums of 2014
Spin	14	50 Best Albums of 2014
Stereogum	14	The 50 Best Albums of 2014
TIME	7	Top 10 Best Albums of 2014
The Village Voice	10	Pazz+Jop Albums of 2014

Decade-end rankings

Publication	Rank	List
Billboard	90	100 Best Albums of the 2010s
BrooklynVegan	11	100 Best Punk & Emo Albums of the 2010s
BrooklynVegan	29	141 Best Albums of the 2010s
Cleveland.com	76	100 Greatest Albums of the 2010s
Consequence of Sound	22	The 100 Top Albums of the 2010s
Kerrang!	5	The 75 Best Albums Of The 2010s
Loudwire	23	The 66 Best Rock Albums of the 2010s
Paste	4	The 40 Best Punk Albums of the 2010s

== Track listing ==
All tracks are written by Laura Jane Grace.

No.	Title	Length
1.	"Transgender Dysphoria Blues"	3:16
2.	"True Trans Soul Rebel"	3:12
3.	"Unconditional Love"	2:51
4.	"Drinking with the Jocks"	1:48
5.	"Osama bin Laden as the Crucified Christ"	2:57
6.	"FUCKMYLIFE666"	2:56
7.	"Dead Friend"	3:02
8.	"Two Coffins"	2:20
9.	"Paralytic States"	3:12
10.	"Black Me Out"	3:09
Total length:		28:43

== Personnel ==
Credits are adapted from the album's liner notes.

Against Me!

- Laura Jane Grace – lead vocals, guitar, bass (all tracks except 3, 6), art direction, producer
- James Bowman – guitar, backing vocals
- Atom Willard – drums, percussion

Additional musicians

- Fat Mike – bass (3, 6)

Production and design

- Billy Bush – recording engineer
- Steak Mtn. – design, typography, and illustration

== Charts ==
Chart (2014)	Peak position
Australian Albums (ARIA)	89
US Billboard 200	23
US Independent Albums (Billboard)	2
US Top Rock Albums (Billboard)	6
US Indie Store Album Sales (Billboard)	2
