= Searching for a Former Clarity =

2005 album by Against Me!

Studio album by Against Me!
- Released: September 6, 2005
- Recorded: April 18 – May 16, 2005
- Studio: The Magpie Cage in Baltimore
- Genres: Punk rock; folk punk
- Length: 47:00
- Label: Fat Wreck Chords
- Producer: J. Robbins

Against Me! chronology
We're Never Going Home (2004)	Searching for a Former Clarity (2005)	Americans Abroad!!! Against Me!!! Live in London!!! (2006)

Singles from Searching for a Former Clarity
- 1. "Don't Lose Touch" Released: September 6, 2005; 2. "From Her Lips to God's Ears (The Energizer)" Released: April 4, 2006

Searching for a Former Clarity is the third studio album by the American punk rock band Against Me!, produced by J. Robbins and released on September 6, 2005, by Fat Wreck Chords. Supported by singles and music videos for the songs "Don't Lose Touch" and "From Her Lips to God's Ears (The Energizer)", it was their first album to chart on the Billboard 200, reaching No. 114. It also reached No. 9 on Billboard's Top Independent Albums chart. Frontwoman Laura Jane Grace has described Searching for a Former Clarity as a concept album.

Label reaction

Fat Mike, on the other hand, thought the album was shit. He told me that he hated J.'s production style, didn't like the mix or the track listing, and that the cover art (a black and white photo of a Florida palm tree) was terrible. "Make the band name bigger!" This took the wind out of our sails a bit and started making me consider our next move. The reason we had stayed indie, signed no contract, and taken less money was for artistic freedom. But now we found ourselves with no contract, in a punk rock handshake deal, but still compromising and fighting with our label over things like artwork and songs.

— Laura Jane Grace with Dan Ozzi, Tranny: Confessions of Punk Rock's Most Infamous Anarchist Sellout

== Composition ==
Searching for a Former Clarity is a punk rock and folk punk album, that incorporates elements of dance-punk, post-punk, dub, oi-punk, and country.

== Commercial performance ==
Searching For a Former Clarity reached #114 on the Billboard 200. As of 2007, the album has sold 52,000 copies.

== Critical reception ==
Professional ratings
Review scores
Source	Rating
AllMusic	4.5/5 stars
Punknews.org	4/5 stars
Rolling Stone	3/5 stars

Reaction to Searching for a Former Clarity was generally positive, with critics praising Grace's lyrics and the band's effective combination of different musical elements. Corey Apar of Allmusic gave the album four and a half stars out of five, calling it the band's "most introspective album to date. In both subject matter and song composition, they expand upon elements of previous releases without being afraid to veer away from expectations". Though describing the tone of the album as "more sober and resentful" in comparison to their previous efforts, he remarked that "the passion, energy, and urgency Against Me! is known for is no less present. Instead, Searching for a Former Clarity is a more developed effort that is not only one of the best punk releases of 2005, but further establishes the band's growing importance within the punk scene."

Aubin Paul of Punknews.org also praised the album, giving it four out of five stars and stating that "Unlike the simple shout-along melodies that adorned previous albums, ...Clarity demands repeated listens far more than any previous album." He praised the band's ability to effectively combine punk rock, country, and folk music, noting that "with Clarity it seems the band has finally managed to fuse these elements seamlessly in a single track." He noted that the lyrics were more personal and "painfully confessional" than on the band's previous efforts, and that the political motifs were more individualistic, focusing on "the effects of politics on real people." He summarized the album as "ambitious, fully realized and truly special. It's also a conflicted record; it's filled with internal ruminations, raw emotions and a distancing wall of sound, but it is nevertheless their most thoughtful and accomplished piece of songwriting and a record that grows more rewarding with each listen."

One criticism which Apar and Paul shared was that both found the chorus of "Unprotected Sex with Multiple Partners" to be "somewhat annoying", though Paul noted that the song had "a great opening and confessional lyrics". Christian Hoard of Rolling Stone was more critical of the album, giving it three out of five stars and describing it as "a bizarro combination of Who's Next, an angry oi-punk record and some dude's blog." He complimented Grace's lyrics as "both wordier and funnier than most rant-based punk" but also said that "over fourteen cuts, [her] Roger Daltrey bellow can grow wearisome". He did, however, praise "Holy Shit!" as "a detailed critique of a stagnating rock scene" and said that "How Low", a slower song in which Grace describes attempts to give up drugs, "prov[es] that you can't get this deep into other people's shit without getting a little on yourself."

== Track listing ==
All lyrics are written by Laura Jane Grace; all music is composed by Grace, James Bowman, Andrew Seward, and Warren Oakes.

No.	Title	Length
1.	"Miami"	4:00
2.	"Mediocrity Gets You Pears (The Shaker)"	2:38
3.	"Justin"	3:57
4.	"Unprotected Sex with Multiple Partners"	4:08
5.	"From Her Lips to God's Ears (The Energizer)"	2:35
6.	"Violence"	5:34
7.	"Pretty Girls (The Mover)"	2:45
8.	"How Low"	4:27
9.	"Joy"	2:12
10.	"Holy Shit!"	2:53
11.	"Even at Our Worst We're Still Better Than Most (The Roller)"	2:53
12.	"Problems"	2:40
13.	"Don't Lose Touch"	2:55
14.	"Searching for a Former Clarity"	3:25
Total length:		47:00

== Total Clarity ==
Total Clarity

Demo album by Against Me!
- Released: May 24, 2011
- Recorded: 2004–2005, Goldentone Studios, Gainesville, Florida
- Genre: Punk rock
- Label: Fat Wreck Chords
- Producer: J. Robbins

Against Me! chronology
White Crosses (2010)	Total Clarity (2011)	Black Crosses (2011)

Professional ratings
Review scores
Source	Rating
AllMusic	2.5/5 stars
Consequence of Sound	B
Punknews.org	4/5 stars

Against Me! released Total Clarity, a collection of demos and unreleased songs from the Searching for a Former Clarity recording sessions, through Fat Wreck Chords on May 24, 2011. Fat Wreck Chords previously released The Original Cowboy, an album of demos from the band's 2003 album Against Me! as the Eternal Cowboy, in 2009.

=== Track listing ===
All lyrics are written by Laura Jane Grace except where noted; all music is composed by Grace, James Bowman, Andrew Seward, and Warren Oakes; except "Money Changes Everything" (music and lyrics by Tom Gray).

No.	Title	Length
1.	"Miami"	3:37
2.	"The Shaker"	3:05
3.	"Justin"	3:15
4.	"Exhaustion and Disgust"	2:49
5.	"Unprotected Sex with Multiple Partners"	4:01
6.	"The Energizer"	2:14
7.	"Violence"	4:48
8.	"The Mover"	2:35
9.	"How Low"	3:16
10.	"Joy"	1:39
11.	"Holy Shit"	2:11
12.	"Lost and Searching in America"	2:38
13.	"Problems"	2:28
14.	"Money Changes Everything" (The Brains cover)	3:48
15.	"Total Clarity"	3:25
Total length:		45:44

== Charts ==
Chart (2013)	Peak position
US Billboard 200	114

== Personnel ==
Adapted from the album liner notes.

=== Band ===
- Laura Jane Grace – guitar, lead vocals
- James Bowman – guitar, backing vocals
- Andrew Seward – bass guitar, backing vocals
- Warren Oakes – drums

=== Additional musicians ===
- Chris Pumphrey – alto saxophone on "Miami"
- Rose Hammer – baritone saxophone on "Miami"
- Geof Manthonre – trumpet on "Miami"
- J. Robbins – tambourine on "Unprotected Sex with Multiple Partners" and "Don't Lose Touch"
- Dave Chamberland, Jon Herroon, Mathieu Guilbault, and Olivier Maguire – backing vocals on "Unprotected Sex with Multiple Partners"
- Genevieve Tremblay – backing vocals on "Unprotected Sex with Multiple Partners" and "How Low"

=== Production ===
- J. Robbins – producer, engineer, mixing engineer
- Alan Douches – mastering
- Json Munn – design
- Paul Schiek – photography

== Chart performance ==
Chart	Peak position
Billboard 200	114
Top Independent Albums	9
