= White Crosses (album) =

2010 studio album by Against Me!

Studio album by Against Me!
- Released: June 8, 2010
- Recorded: August–October 2009
- Studios: Eldorado Recording, Burbank, California
- Genres: Punk rock; power pop; arena rock
- Length: 36:06
- Labels: Sire, Total Treble (Reissue)
- Producers: Butch Vig, Alan Moulder (mixer)

Against Me! chronology
The Original Cowboy (2009)	White Crosses (2010)	Total Clarity (2011)

Singles from White Crosses
- 1. "I Was a Teenage Anarchist" Released: April 6, 2010; 2. "White Crosses" Released: August 31, 2010; 3. "High Pressure Low" Released: December 21, 2010

White Crosses is the fifth studio album by American punk rock band Against Me!, and their second to be released on Sire Records. As with its predecessor, 2007's New Wave, the album was produced by Butch Vig. It is also the only Against Me! album to feature George Rebelo, drummer of Hot Water Music, following the departure of previous drummer Warren Oakes.

Recording began in August 2009, finishing two months later. The mixing and mastering of the album finished in February 2010, and it was released June 8. The initial pressing of the record included four bonus tracks. This is also the last album prior to Laura Jane Grace's transition.

On March 17, 2010, their first video from the album, "Rapid Decompression", was released online via AOL Spinner. A four-track digital EP for "I Was a Teenage Anarchist" was released as the first single from the album, on April 7, 2010.

The two outtakes from the White Crosses sessions are "David Johansen's Soul", of which an acoustic version was released on Black Crosses, and "Dead Generations", which remains unreleased in any form.

== Reception ==
Professional ratings
Aggregate scores
Source	Rating
Metacritic	77/100
Review scores
Source	Rating
AbsolutePunk	83%
AllMusic	3.5/5 stars
The A.V. Club	B+
Entertainment Weekly	B+
LAS Magazine	9.4/10
PopMatters	7/10
Punknews.org	2.5/5 stars
Slant Magazine	4/5 stars
Spin	7/10

White Crosses received generally favorable critical reception, despite being leaked three months before its retail release date. The album was mainly praised for its success in merging Against Me!'s long-time punk rock style with, according to critics, a newfound ethos of "arena-" or "radio rock", through its melody and "big" sound.

== Track listing ==
All tracks are written by Laura Jane Grace.

No.	Title	Length
1.	"White Crosses"	3:36
2.	"I Was a Teenage Anarchist"	3:15
3.	"Because of the Shame"	4:21
4.	"Suffocation"	3:56
5.	"We're Breaking Up"	3:57
6.	"High Pressure Low"	4:13
7.	"Ache with Me"	3:38
8.	"Spanish Moss"	3:51
9.	"Rapid Decompression"	1:46
10.	"Bamboo Bones"	3:35
Total length:		36:06

=== Bonus tracks ===
Limited edition
No.	Title	Length
11.	"One by One"	3:34
12.	"Bob Dylan Dream"	2:59
13.	"Lehigh Acres"	3:33
14.	"Bitter Divisions"	4:02
Total length:		50:10

Re-issue
No.	Title	Length
11.	"Lehigh Acres"	3:33
12.	"Bob Dylan Dream"	2:59
13.	"One by One"	3:34
14.	"Bitter Divisions"	4:02
Total length:		50:10

iTunes Deluxe edition
No.	Title	Length
15.	"I Was a Teenage Anarchist" (acoustic)	3:38
Total length:		53:48

== Black Crosses ==
Black Crosses

Demo album by Against Me!
- Released: July 26, 2011
- Recorded: 2009, Goldentone Studios, Gainesville, Florida; February 2010, Crescendo Studios
- Genres: Punk rock, alternative rock
- Length: 43:07
- Labels: Total Treble, Xtra Mile Recordings
- Producer: Against Me!

Against Me! chronology
Total Clarity (2011)	Black Crosses (2011)	Transgender Dysphoria Blues (2014)

In 2011 Against Me! launched their own record label, Total Treble Music, reissuing White Crosses with an added disc titled Black Crosses consisting of demos from 2009 (referred to as the Goldentone Studio versions) and acoustic sessions from 2010. The reissue features original artwork by Steak Mtn and a 32-page booklet with lyrics and additional artwork, and was released July 26, 2011, on compact disc and as a music download, and August 9 as a triple LP; it became available in the UK and Europe in November from the band's UK label Xtra Mile Recordings.

=== Track listing ===
All tracks are written by Laura Jane Grace.

Black Crosses
No.	Title	Length
1.	"White Crosses" (Goldentone)	3:14
2.	"I Was a Teenage Anarchist" (acoustic)	3:39
3.	"Because of the Shame" (acoustic)	4:28
4.	""The Western World"" (Goldentone; Demo version of "Suffocation")	3:55
5.	"Strip Mall Parking Lots" (Goldentone)	2:21
6.	"High Pressure Low" (acoustic)	4:18
7.	""Hot Shots"" (Goldentone; officially untitled)	1:49
8.	"Spanish Moss" (Goldentone)	2:22
9.	"Rapid Decompression" (Goldentone)	1:45
10.	"Soul Surrender" (Goldentone)	2:06
11.	"Lehigh Acres" (Goldentone)	3:36
12.	"David Johansen's Soul" (acoustic)	2:49
13.	"One by One" (acoustic)	3:35
14.	"Bitter Divisions" (Goldentone)	3:10
Total length:		43:07

== Charts ==
Chart (2010)	Peak position
German Albums (Offizielle Top 100)	87
Greek Albums (IFPI)	23
US Billboard 200	34
US Top Rock Albums (Billboard)	9
US Top Tastemaker Albums (Billboard)	11

== Personnel ==
=== Band ===
- Laura Jane Grace – lead vocals, guitar
- James Bowman – guitar, backing vocals
- Andrew Seward – bass guitar, backing vocals
- George Rebelo – drums, backing vocals
- Warren Oakes – drums, backing vocals on Black Crosses (tracks 1, 4–5, 7–11, 14)

=== Additional musicians ===
- Zac Rae – additional keyboards on White Crosses (tracks 3, 5)
- Jon Gaunt – fiddle on White Crosses (track 12), Black Crosses (track 7)
- Ron McGregor – mouth harp on White Crosses (track 12)

=== Production ===
- Butch Vig – producer
- Billy Bush – recording engineer
- Chris Steffen – assistant engineer
- Alan Moulder – mix engineer
- Darren Lawson – mix assistant
- Emily Lazar and Joe LaPorta – mastering

=== Art and design ===
- Christopher Norris and Laura Jane Grace – art direction
- Steak Mtn – design, typography, and illustration
- Autumn deWilde – band photography
