= Against Me! (2001 EP) =

EP by Against Me!
- Released: November 2001 (7" Vinyl); February 2003 (CD)
- Recorded: July 23 and August 1, 2001
- Studio: Goldentone Studios
- Genre: Folk punk, punk rock
- Length: 16:56
- Language: English
- Label: Sabot Productions
- Producer: Against Me!

Against Me! chronology
Crime as Forgiven by Against Me! (2001)	Against Me! (2001)	Against Me! Is Reinventing Axl Rose (2002)

Professional ratings
Review scores
Source	Rating
Allmusic	4/5 stars

Against Me!, also known as The Acoustic EP, is the second widely distributed release by the punk band Against Me!. No tracks on the album contain any electric instruments or drums, only acoustic guitars and an acoustic bass. The original vinyl version, released November 2001, had four tracks, and two extra songs were included on the CD version released in February 2003. Electric versions of several songs appeared on the band's debut full-length Against Me! Is Reinventing Axl Rose.

This EP was never officially titled. The words "Acoustic EP" do not appear anywhere on the album or in the liner notes. In a manner similar to that of the Beatles's White Album, it is technically self-titled, but is nearly always referred to as The Acoustic EP, including on the band's official website.

== Track listing ==
All tracks are written by Laura Jane Grace.

7"
No.	Title	Length
1.	"Jordan's First Choice"	2:09
2.	"Those Anarcho Punks Are Mysterious..."	2:40
3.	"Reinventing Axl Rose"	2:12
4.	"We Did It All for Don"	3:10
Total length:		10:09

CD
No.	Title	Length
5.	"Pints of Guinness Make You Strong"	3:11
6.	"Armageddon" (hidden track)	3:36
Total length:		16:56

== Personnel ==
- Laura Jane Grace – guitar, vocals, artwork
- Dustin Fridkin – bass, vocals, artwork
- Adam Volk – backing vocals
- Jordan Kleeman – backing vocals, artwork
- Rob McGregor – recording, mastering
- James Bowman – artwork
- Var Thelin – artwork
