= At War with the Silverfish =

EP by Laura Jane Grace
- Released: September 22, 2021
- Recorded: 2021
- Studio: TinyQuietStudio in Chicago and at Electric Eel in St. Louis
- Genre: Folk punk; folk rock
- Length: 14:26
- Label: Polyvinyl

Laura Jane Grace chronology
Stay Alive (2020)	At War with the Silverfish (2021)	Hole in My Head (2024)

At War with the Silverfish is the second solo extended play by American singer-songwriter Laura Jane Grace. It was surprise released on September 22, 2021 by Polyvinyl Record Co.

== Background ==
The EP primarily features acoustic folk punk and folk rock songs, with a hint of power pop. While Grace clarified that it is not a "pandemic album", the uncertainty brought on by the pandemic influenced the EP's surprise release. Speaking about her writing process, she shared "I've just been trying to stay sane over the past year and a half or so. I've been in this mindset of 'Just keep working. Just keep writing songs. Share them while you're excited about them so they feel relevant to you.'" In a press release, Grace described the collection as "songs of late-night madness and loneliness, orphan songs that came wandering in, looking to feed like insects".

== Critical reception ==
Professional ratings
Review scores
Source	Rating
NME	4/5 stars

In a review for NME, Justin McMahon commended Grace for revisiting her folk punk roots, noting that "Yesterday Part II" could easily fit into an Against Me! album. Skyler Graham of Mxdwn remarked "Laura Jane Grace has a remarkable talent for conveying deeply personal yet relatable stories, and At War With The Silverfish finds the balance between experiences that are both heartbreaking and universal."

== Track listing ==
All tracks are written by Laura Jane Grace.

No.	Title	Length
1.	"Three of Hearts"	1:39
2.	"Lolo 13"	2:41
3.	"Long Dark Night"	1:58
4.	"Electro-Static Sweep"	3:26
5.	"Day Old Coffee"	1:13
6.	"Smug FuckFace"	1:28
7.	"Yesterday Pt. II"	1:47
Total length:		14:26
