= I Was a Teenage Anarchist =

Single by Against Me!

from the album White Crosses
- Released: April 6, 2010
- Recorded: 2009
- Genre: Punk rock; emo
- Label: Sire
- Composer(s): Against Me!
- Lyricist(s): Laura Jane Grace
- Producer(s): Butch Vig

Against Me! singles chronology
| "Stop!" (2008) | "I Was a Teenage Anarchist" (2010) | "White Crosses" (2010) |

Music video
- "I Was A Teenage Anarchist" on YouTube

"I Was a Teenage Anarchist" is a song by the Gainesville, Florida-based punk rock band Against Me!, released as the first single from their 2010 album White Crosses. The single was released as a four-track digital download through various online music stores on April 6, 2010, including the additional album track "Rapid Decompression" and two B-sides from the album's sessions, "One by One" and "Bitter Divisions". A 7" single was released on April 17 in conjunction with Record Store Day, with an acoustic version of "I Was a Teenage Anarchist" featuring as the B-side.

== Music video ==
The music video for the song features Laura Jane Grace in traditional punk clothing running through a park being chased by a police officer, who tackles and then starts beating her. After a while members of a crowd that had formed attack the officer, freeing Grace. However, these members are accosted by other officers. Grace begins to run away, only to be stopped by more police officers. At the end of the video Grace is shown being shoved into a police car, smiling after a few moments. The video is shot in a single long take, entirely in slow motion.

== Track listing ==
All lyrics written by Laura Jane Grace, all music composed by Against Me!

=== Download version ===
| No. | Title | Length |
|---|---|---|
| 1. | "I Was a Teenage Anarchist" | 3:13 |
| 2. | "Rapid Decompression" | 1:43 |
| 3. | "One by One" | 3:32 |
| 4. | "Bitter Divisions" | 4:01 |
| Total length: | | 12:29 |

=== 7" version ===
Side A
| No. | Title | Length |
|---|---|---|
| 1. | "I Was a Teenage Anarchist" | 3:13 |

Side B
| No. | Title | Length |
|---|---|---|
| 1. | "I Was a Teenage Anarchist" (acoustic) | 3:36 |

== Controversy and feud with Rise Against ==
Laura Jane Grace's response to Rise Against's "Architects"

I think that the song was misinterpreted by both Tim and a lot of people. I’m not asking myself the question “Do you remember when you were young and you wanted to set the world on fire?” I’m asking the listener that question. I’m not saying that I’ve forgotten that feeling in any way. I guess I don’t really understand Rise Against’s politics or I don’t understand the statement that ‘The revolution was a lie’, seems to, for a lot of people, put them really up in arms. I always feel like asking the question ‘Well how the fuck wasn’t it?” Where’s the revolution man? What’s Rise Against’s revolution? What’s the revolution? Is there a revolution that, a bunch of people are gonna start coming out to their shows and make them really rich and a really big band? Because that’s been done a million fucking times before. Is the revolution that they’re gonna be poster boys for PETA while wearing Nike shoes? ‘Cause I don’t fucking buy into it, man. I think PETA’s full of shit. I think a lot of their politics are kinda opportunistic and self-serving, personally.

Lyrics from the song's hook, "Do you remember when you were young and you wanted to set the world on fire?", drew controversy when fellow American punk rock band Rise Against released their song "Architects" in 2011, containing the lyrics "Don't you remember when you were young and you wanted to set the world on fire? Somewhere deep down, I know you do. Don't you remember when you were young and you wanted to set the world on fire? Well I still am, and I still do!" The lyrics were interpreted as specifically responding to and calling out Against Me!'s song.

In an interview, Rise Against lead singer Tim McIlrath explained his reasoning behind the lyrical choice. "I felt like the Against Me! song was really dismissive of the fire in my belly, and fire in many of our fans' bellies. It was asking for, and deserved, a response... that line seemed to trivialize what many of us still hold on to unapologetically." In 2022, McIlrath said that he "certainly didn’t write that to create any kind of beef," but also compared media coverage of the band's feud to "just a tree that fell in the forest that no one heard. I expected a little more."

Grace responded to Rise Against's song in an interview, criticizing the band's politics and the ease at which the lyric "The revolution was a lie" angered McIlrath. In 2016, Grace stated that, despite being close with Rise Against and having toured with them in the past, "At the time it just seemed like posturing, you know? Like, 'Okay, whatever, sure. You’re more revolutionary than me. You can have it.'" Grace recalled an incident soon after the song came out where McIlrath gave her a stare while the two were together backstage during a festival.

== Personnel ==
=== Band ===
- Laura Jane Grace – guitar, lead vocals
- James Bowman – guitar, backing vocals
- Andrew Seward – bass guitar, backing vocals
- George Rebelo – drums

=== Production ===
- Butch Vig – producer

== Charts ==
=== Weekly charts ===
| Chart (2010) | Peak position |
|---|---|
| Canada (Canadian Hot 100) | 66 |
| US Alternative Airplay (Billboard) | 16 |
| US Hot Rock & Alternative Songs (Billboard) | 31 |

=== Year-end charts ===
| Chart (2010) | Peak position |
|---|---|
| US Alternative Airplay (Billboard) | 50 |
