= Against Me! (demo) =

Demo album by Against Me!
- Released: June 1997
- Recorded: December 25, 1996
- Genre: Folk punk, lo-fi
- Length: 19:04
- Label: none, self released
- Producer: Laura Jane Grace

Against Me! chronology
Against Me! (1997)	Against Me! (2000 EP) (2000)

Against Me!, more commonly known as Tom's Demo Tape, or simply the First Demo, is a demo album and the first release by Laura Jane Grace under the name Against Me! in June 1997. It was recorded on December 25, 1996, by Laura Jane Grace at her mother's house in Naples, FL. Physical copies of the tape are extremely rare; (likely non- existent at this point), however, all 6 tracks can easily be found circulating on YouTube.

== Track listing ==
All tracks are written by Laura Jane Grace.

No.	Title	Length
1.	"The Price Of Freedom"	2:54
2.	"Does It Make A Difference?"	3:01
3.	"Same Old Song"	2:38
4.	"In The Name Of What?"	4:02
5.	"Disgust"	3:04
6.	"24 Hours A Day"	3:30
Total length:		19:09

== Personnel ==
Laura Jane Grace - Vocals, guitar, artwork

== See also ==
- Against Me! discography
