= Against Me! as the Eternal Cowboy =

Album by Against Me!

Studio album by Against Me!
- Released: November 3, 2003
- Recorded: July 15, 2003 and August 2003
- Studios: Goldentone, Gainesville, Florida, Ardent, Memphis, Tennessee
- Genres: Punk rock; folk punk; country folk; anti-folk; Americana
- Length: 25:07
- Label: Fat Wreck Chords
- Producer: Rob McGregor

Against Me! chronology
Against Me! Is Reinventing Axl Rose (2002)	Against Me! as the Eternal Cowboy (2003)	We're Never Going Home (2004)

Singles from Against Me! as the Eternal Cowboy
- 1. "Cavalier Eternal" Released: May 4, 2004; 2. "Sink, Florida, Sink" Released: April 8, 2005

Against Me! as the Eternal Cowboy (sometimes referred to as just The Eternal Cowboy) is the second studio album by the American punk rock band Against Me!, released on November 3, 2003, by Fat Wreck Chords. It was the group's first release for the label and their first album with bassist Andrew Seward, who had replaced original bassist Dustin Fridkin the previous year. The album was produced by Rob McGregor, who had also produced their first album Against Me! Is Reinventing Axl Rose (2002). Two singles were released in support of the album, "Cavalier Eternal" and "Sink, Florida, Sink", though each features different versions of the songs than those found on the album. As the Eternal Cowboy was Against Me!'s first album to reach the Billboard charts, reaching No. 36 on Top Independent Albums.

In 2009 Fat Wreck Chords released The Original Cowboy, a demo recording that the band had done in preparation for recording the album.

== Background ==
While on tour for Reinventing Axl Rose in 2002, Against Me! asked their label, No Idea Records, for $3,000 of financial support to help repair their tour van, which was broken and had no air conditioning. When the label refused, the band left No Idea and decided to sign to another label. The band then met Fat Wreck Chords employee Toby Jeg at a show in the Mission District of San Francisco, California. When Jeg offered the band the opportunity to record a 7" single, Grace asked if they could record a full-length instead; Jeg told Grace he would call the label head, Fat Mike, to discuss the idea. Fat Wreck Chords had previously considered offering the band a contract, but had voted it down as they thought they would be "stealing" the band from No Idea. A few months later in late 2002, Fat Mike called Grace, and the band was offered a $25,000 advance, significantly higher than the $800 budget Reinventing Axl Rose was recorded with; Grace agreed to this, and bluffed their way onto the label by claiming they had already written songs for their next record; this led to the band having to rush and quickly write new songs before recording.

== Recording ==
Against Me! announced plans to record the album in July 2003, stating that they would work with producer Rob McGregor, who had recorded their first album and two previous EPs, and that the album would be released November 4. The band planned to record at Ardent Studios in Memphis, Tennessee, where they could make an all-analog recording with very few overdubs. Laura chose to record in Memphis as it was where The Replacements, who she was very into at the time, had recorded their albums. In order to ensure that McGregor would be familiar with the new songs by the time they went to Memphis, the band recorded demos for the entire album at his Goldentone Studios in their hometown of Gainesville, Florida on July 15 in the span of a few hours. The rest of the album was recorded that August at Ardent. The version of "Cavalier Eternal" from the July 15 Goldentone session was used on the album, as Fat Wreck Chords head Fat Mike preferred it to the version recorded at Ardent. The entire Goldentone demo session was released in 2009 by Fat Wreck Chords as The Original Cowboy.

Against Me! as the Eternal Cowboy was mixed and engineered by Pete Matthews and assistant engineer Adam Hill, and was mastered by Brad Blackwood at Euphonic Masters. Singer/guitarist Laura Jane Grace designed the album's artwork and layout, using photographs taken by Bryan K. Wynacht.

== Composition ==
Grace described the record in 2003 as a concept album "that explores love and war", explaining an ambiguity with regards to the album's title's reference to its songs: an Eternal Cowboy can be "symbolic of the power structure" or of "someone forever wandering, lost and alone".

Clocking in at 25 minutes, As The Eternal Cowboy is the band's shortest album, and borders on being classed as an EP. Laura Jane Grace explained the album's speed was due to the band's collective anxiety on making records after bluffing their way onto the label; "All these songs are too fucking fast. We were just nervous when we went in and were tracking, and we recorded them all too fast. At that point, we had never messed around with listening to a click or remembering the tempo we were in. It was just whatever the mood was." The album was originally 24 minutes long, resulting in the band having to re-record parts of the songs to make them longer. Fat Wreck Chords did not care about the album's short length, something which Laura Jane Grace attributed to the label's focus on their new signing, None More Black, instead of the band.

== Release ==
The album's title and track listing were announced in September 2003, followed by news that the band's previous label No Idea Records would release the singles for "Cavalier Eternal" and "Sink, Florida, Sink", using alternate versions of the songs from the recording sessions, including the version of "Cavalier Eternal" recorded at Ardent.

== Critical reception ==
Professional ratings
Review scores
Source	Rating
AllMusic	4/5 stars

Critic Charles Spano of AllMusic remarked that "the Gainesville, FL, outfit may have embraced a slightly slicker production than with its fan favorite, Reinventing Axl Rose, but no matter how you stack it, As the Eternal Cowboy is an accomplished record of country-folk-punk that would only qualify as over-polished by the most hard-lined, anti-bar code punk kids' criteria." He also called it "one of the few early-2000s punk albums that transcends its genre and has the rock & roll clout to storm the mainstream."

== Track listing ==
All lyrics are written by Laura Jane Grace; all music is composed by Grace, James Bowman, Andrew Seward, and Warren Oakes.

No.	Title	Length
1.	"T.S.R. (This Shit Rules)"	1:35
2.	"Cliché Guevara"	2:09
3.	"Mutiny on the Electronic Bay"	1:12
4.	"Sink, Florida, Sink"	2:40
5.	"Slurring the Rhythms"	2:42
6.	"Rice and Bread"	1:42
7.	"A Brief Yet Triumphant Intermission"	1:29
8.	"Unsubstantiated Rumors Are Good Enough for Me to Base My Life Upon"	1:40
9.	"You Look Like I Need a Drink"	2:14
10.	"Turn Those Clapping Hands into Angry Balled Fists"	4:46
11.	"Cavalier Eternal"	2:53
Total length:		25:07

== Personnel ==
Band

- Laura Jane Grace – guitar, lead vocals, art concepts and layout
- James Bowman – guitar, backing vocals
- Andrew Seward – bass guitar, backing vocals
- Warren Oakes – drums

Production

- Rob McGregor – producer
- Pete Matthews – mixing engineer, engineer
- Adam Hill – assistant engineer
- Brad Blackwood – mastering
- Bryan K. Wynacht – photography

== Chart performance ==
Chart	Peak position
Top Independent Albums	36

== The Original Cowboy ==
The Original Cowboy

Demo album by Against Me!
- Released: July 7, 2009
- Recorded: July 15, 2003
- Studios: Goldentone, Gainesville, Florida
- Genre: Punk rock
- Length: 22:11
- Label: Fat Wreck Chords
- Producer: Rob McGregor

Against Me! chronology
New Wave (2007)	The Original Cowboy (2009)	White Crosses (2010)

Professional ratings
Review scores
Source	Rating
AllMusic	2.5/5 stars

On July 7, 2009 Fat Wreck Chords released the entire July 15, 2003 demo session for Against Me! as the Eternal Cowboy under the title The Original Cowboy. The recordings were mastered in 2009 by Emily Lazar and Joe LaPorta at The Lodge. Reflecting on the session, Grace remarked that "The Original Cowboy was only meant to be a trial run, but, listening to it today, there's a part of me that feels foolish for ever recording these songs a second time." The label posted an MP3 of the demo version of "Unsubstantiated Rumors (Are Good Enough for Me to Base My Life On)" for free download prior to the album's release.

=== Critical reception ===
Corey Apar of AllMusic called it "one of those records that forces an important question – why was this released?", noting that the songs "basically sound the same" as on the original album, whereas "usually when demos surface, they're noticeably different than the finished songs – stripped down melodies on acoustic guitar, choruses missing harmonies, some of the lyrics might even be different. Yet 'Unsubstantiated Rumors' is the only song here with significant changes". He also criticized the lack of any extra material such as B-sides or live tracks.

=== Track listing ===
All lyrics are written by Laura Jane Grace; all music is composed by Grace, James Bowman, Andrew Seward, and Warren Oakes.

No.	Title	Length
1.	"A Brief Yet Triumphant Introduction / Cliché Guevara"	3:40
2.	"Mutiny on the Electronic Bay"	1:13
3.	"T.S.R."	1:39
4.	"Rice and Bread"	1:39
5.	"Cavalier Eternal"	2:52
6.	"Unsubstantiated Rumors (Are Good Enough for Me to Base My Life Upon)"	1:29
7.	"Slurring the Rhythms"	2:41
8.	"You Look Like I Need a Drink / Turn Those Clapping Hands into Angry Balled Fists"	7:02
Total length:		22:11
