= Against Me! (2000 EP) =

EP by Against Me!
- Released: 1st pressing: 1999 2nd pressing: May 2000
- Recorded: 1999
- Genre: Folk Punk
- Length: 19:00
- Label: Crasshole Records, Sabot Productions
- Producer: 1st pressing: none, 2nd pressing: Jordan Kleeman

Against Me! chronology
Against Me! (1997 demo) (1997)	Against Me! (1999)	Crime as Forgiven by Against Me! (2001)

Against Me!, the self-titled 12" EP by punk band Against Me! was their first EP release. It was released twice as an EP. There were originally 500 copies printed. However, due to a mastering defect or "recording error" on the vinyl, only 145 copies were originally released to the public, 50 of which were sold at the record release party. Thus, actual copies of the record are extremely rare, though the tracks are widely circulated on the internet. The remaining 355 copies were eventually released through personal sales by the band.

== Track listing ==
All lyrics are written by Laura Jane Grace; all music is composed by Laura Jane Grace and Kevin Mahon.

No.	Title	Length
1.	"Haste Killed Creativity"	5:04
2.	"I Am Citizen"	2:56
3.	"Walking Is Still Honest"	3:28
4.	"Rock 'N' Roll Bullshit"	3:24
5.	"All Or Nothing"	4:02
Total length:		18:54

== Personnel ==
- Laura Jane Grace – guitar, vocals, harmonica on "I Am Citizen"
- Kevin Mahon – drums, percussion
