= Against Me! =

American punk rock band

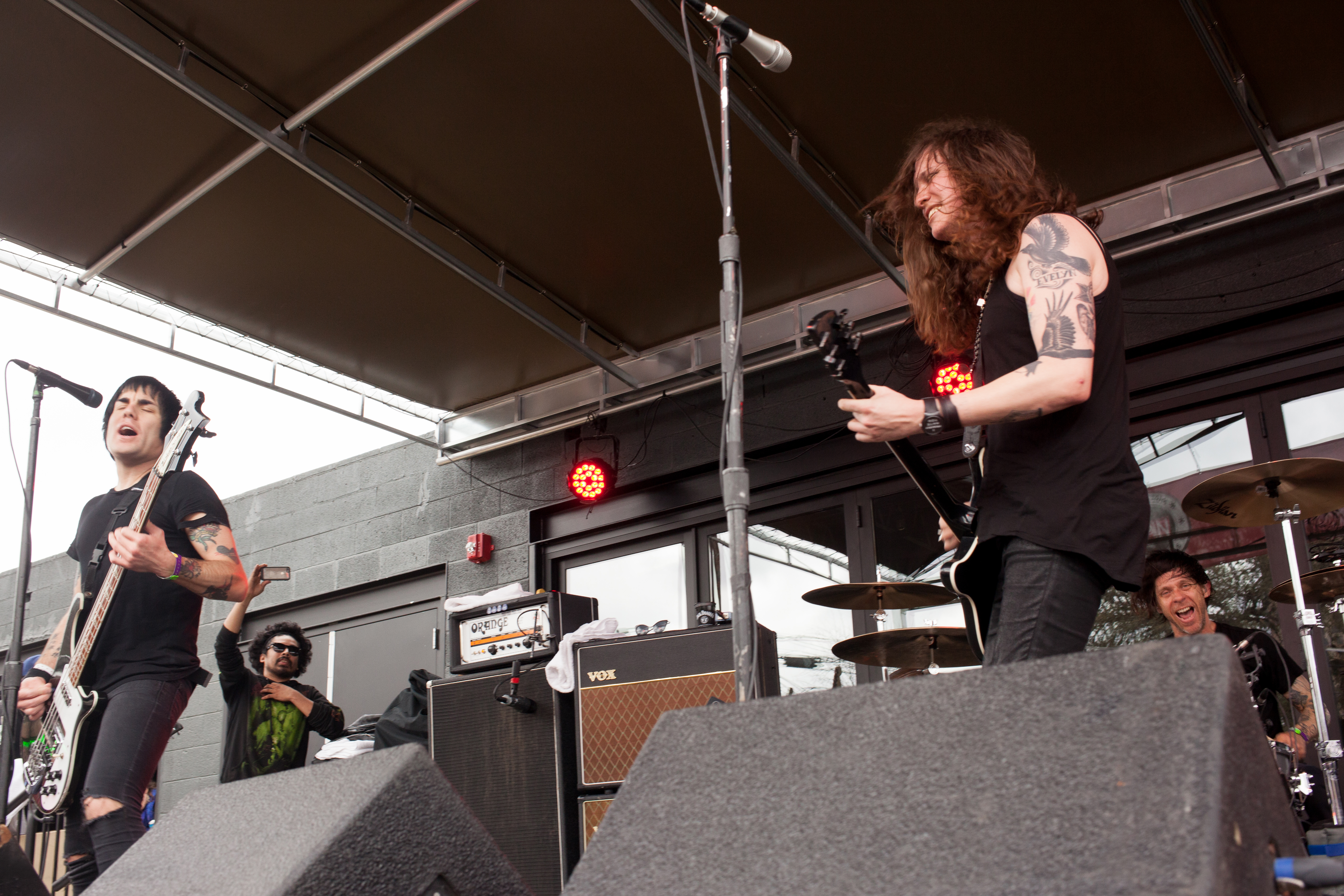
- Against Me! performing at South by Southwest in 2014

Background information
- Origin: Naples, Florida, US
- Genres: Punk rock; folk punk; alternative rock; anarcho-punk
- Works: Against Me! discography
- Years active: 1997–2020 (Note: Indefinite hiatus.)
- Labels: Misanthrope; Crasshole; Plan-It-X; No Idea; Sabot; Fat Wreck Chords; Sire; Total Treble; Xtra Mile
- Past members: Laura Jane Grace; Kevin Mahon; James Bowman; Dustin Fridkin; Warren Oakes; Andrew Seward; George Rebelo; Jay Weinberg; Atom Willard; Inge Johansson
- Website: againstme.net

Against Me! is an American punk rock band, formed in 1997 in Naples, Florida, by singer and guitarist Laura Jane Grace. That same year, Grace moved to Gainesville, Florida, which is considered the band's hometown. Since 2001, the band's lineup has also included guitarist James Bowman, who has played on all of their studio albums. After releasing three studio albums through independent record labels, Against Me! moved to Sire Records for 2007's New Wave, which reached no. 57 on the Billboard 200. In 2011, the band launched the record label Total Treble.

In 2012, Grace publicly came out as a trans woman. After a long period of line-up changes and uncertainty surrounding the band's future, their sixth studio album, Transgender Dysphoria Blues, was released independently in January 2014 to critical and commercial acclaim. The band's seventh full-length, Shape Shift with Me, was released September 16, 2016.

Following the release of Shape Shift with Me, longtime bassist Andrew Seward rejoined the group in 2018. Though the group intended to record a new album, plans were derailed by the COVID-19 pandemic. The band entered an indefinite hiatus and Grace launched a solo career.

== History ==
=== 1997–2002: The early years and Reinventing Axl Rose ===
Against Me! was formed in 1997 by singer/guitarist Laura Jane Grace as a solo act, amidst the breakup of her previous band(s). The first Against Me! release was an eponymously titled demo tape in 1997. It was self-released in very limited numbers. With the addition of drummer Kevin Mahon, a second demo, Vivida Vis! (1998), was released in limited numbers by Misanthrope Records. The band started their first tour in March 1999, a month-long tour of the East coast, during which they met Jordan Kleeman in Baltimore, Maryland. The band's first EP, Against Me!, was released twice through Crasshole Records (once in 1999 and 2000). Grace's longtime friend James Bowman joined the band for a west coast tour in support of the EP, traveling in Grace's 1976 Buick LeSabre, the engine of which exploded at the end of the tour. Their first widely distributed release was the EP Crime as Forgiven by Against Me! (2001), released by Plan-It-X Records and Sabot Productions (run by longtime Against Me! tour manager Jordan Kleeman). While neither Bowman or Fridkin had part in the recording of Crime as Forgiven by Against Me!, they both joined the band on tour to support it. On April 23, 2001, while heading south on I-75, returning home from their first tour as a four-piece band, their van was struck by a semi truck. They landed upside-down in a ditch. No one was harmed, but the van and equipment were destroyed, after which Bowman and Mahon left the band. The band broke up for a few months that year. A third EP, a self-titled acoustic recording by Grace and bassist Dustin Fridkin, was released in November 2001.

Mahon was eventually replaced by Warren Oakes, and guitarist James Bowman returned in December 2001 during the recording of the band's first album, Against Me! Is Reinventing Axl Rose, released in March 2002 by No Idea Records. Fridkin left during the summer of 2002 to return to college and was replaced by Andrew Seward of the Tennessee band kill devil hills, and this new lineup released the single "The Disco Before the Breakdown" (2002). This lineup remained intact until 2009.

=== 2003–2006: As the Eternal Cowboy and Searching for a Former Clarity ===
Against Me! signed to Fat Wreck Chords and released their second album, 2003's Against Me! as the Eternal Cowboy. It reached no. 36 on Billboard's Top Independent Albums chart and was supported by singles for "Cavalier Eternal" and "Sink, Florida, Sink". The DVD We're Never Going Home followed, documenting their Spring 2004 tour. 2005's Searching for a Former Clarity was their first album to chart on the Billboard 200, reaching no. 114. Against Me! supported the album with a tour of all 50 U.S. states. It spawned singles for "Don't Lose Touch" and "From Her Lips to God's Ears (The Energizer)", which also became the band's first music videos. The live album Americans Abroad!!! Against Me!!! Live in London!!! followed in 2006.

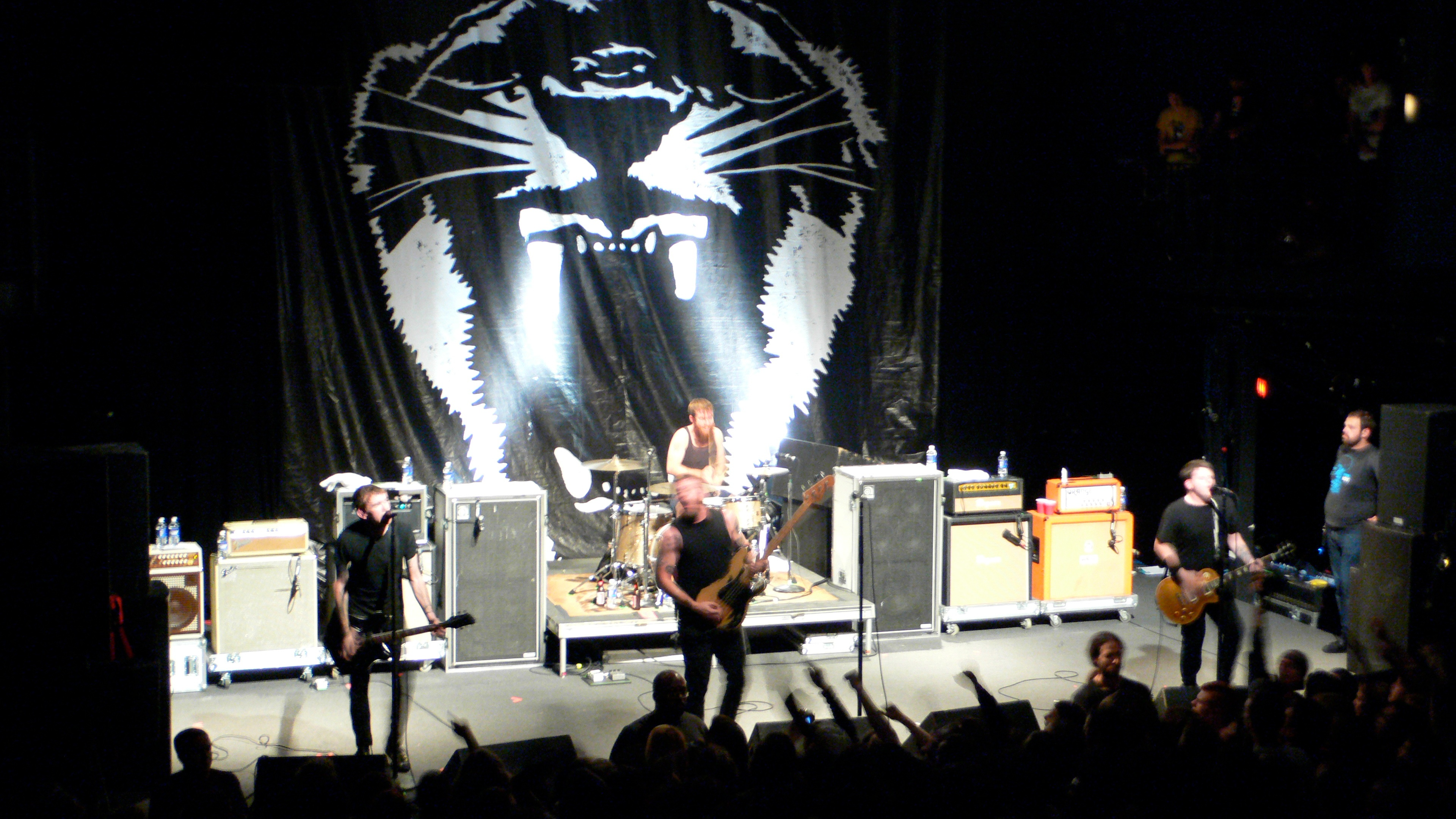
Against Me! on tour in support of New Wave

=== 2007–2010: New Wave and White Crosses ===
Against Me! moved to Sire Records for 2007's New Wave, produced by Butch Vig. It debuted at no. 57 on the Billboard 200 and featured their first charting single, "Thrash Unreal", which reached no. 11 on Billboard's Modern Rock Tracks chart. "White People for Peace", "Stop!", and "New Wave" were also released as singles, and New Wave was named as Spin's album of the year. The DVD Live at the Key Club followed later that year. In 2008, Against Me! supported Foo Fighters on a North American tour, and Sire released the digital EP New Wave B-Sides. In October 2008, while traveling west on I-80, en route to Salt Lake City, their tour bus hit a patch of ice; causing it to spin and land on its side in a ditch. No one was harmed.

For the 2008 presidential election, Against Me! partnered with Rock the Vote.

Oakes left the band in June 2009, in part to focus on running his Mexican food restaurant. In an interview with MTV Oakes wanted it to be known that he wasn't fired, but rather, his leaving the band "was really a mutual decision ... it was really amicable." He said he still considers the band members to be "more than friends -- they're family," and added that Boca is already carrying Against Me! guitarist James Bowman's homemade hot sauce on the menu.

Oakes was replaced by Hot Water Music drummer George Rebelo. The following month Fat Wreck Chords released The Original Cowboy, an album of demo recordings from the Against Me! as the Eternal Cowboy sessions.

Against Me! released White Crosses, their second album with Sire, on June 8, 2010 (although it was leaked about 3 months earlier). It was supported by singles for "I Was a Teenage Anarchist", "White Crosses", and "High Pressure Low" and was their highest-charting album to date, reaching no. 34 on the Billboard 200. On the eve of a scheduled tour of Australia and New Zealand that September, the band suddenly cancelled all touring plans due to "a culmination of circumstances", expressing the need to "take some time off from touring to go home and sort things out."

Against Me! departed from Sire Records on November 29, 2010. Following a two-month hiatus from touring, the band spoke for the first time since their tour cancellation, talking of their upcoming December 2010 shows, which saw Jay Weinberg cover for George Rebelo on drums, as he toured with Hot Water Music.

Throughout December 2010, Grace spoke of George Rebelo's intentions to record an album with his primary band Hot Water Music. In January 2011, Weinberg was officially confirmed as Against Me!'s new drummer. Total Clarity, an album of demos and unreleased songs from the Searching for a Former Clarity sessions, was released on May 24, 2011, through Fat Wreck Chords.

=== 2011–2017: Transgender Dysphoria Blues and Shape Shift with Me ===
In 2010 Grace had expressed the desire to release at least one album per year for the next decade.

On June 3, 2011, the band announced that they started their own record label, Total Treble. In July 2011, the band released "Black Crosses" which were demos and alternate versions of songs from "White Crosses". In September 2011, Grace built a recording studio in Elkton, Florida, for future Against Me! projects. The studio has since been named Total Treble Studio. The first band to record an album in the studio were Cheap Girls from Lansing, Michigan, with their album Giant Orange.

In May 2012 Grace publicly came out as transgender, having dealt with gender dysphoria since childhood, and began her transition. "I felt like I drop-kicked them in the face," she said of informing the other members of Against Me! "We had the most awkward hug ever, and then they left. And the second I shut the door, I was like, 'What the fuck did I just do?'" Gender dysphoria is the theme of the band's sixth studio album, an autobiographical account of Laura Jane Grace's experience as a trans woman and of social and body dysphoria. They began recording in February 2012 at Total Treble Studio, working without Butch Vig, who produced New Wave and White Crosses. Instead, Grace was acting as both recording engineer and record producer for the album. Weinberg departed the group that December. Drummer Atom Willard filled in with the band for their 2013 Australian tour dates, and was confirmed as the band's new drummer on July 31, 2013. In March 2013, the band canceled their US tour with Bad Religion. In May 2013, bassist Andrew Seward also announced his departure from the band. Grace expressed that she felt the band wouldn't have continued under the name Against Me! were it not for the then-upcoming record having a message she wanted to spread. On June 24, 2013, Grace announced that recording for Transgender Dysphoria Blues was finished. Grace went on a solo tour in August in a handful of east coast US cities in support of the record.

On July 15, 2013, Against Me! released the "True Trans" single for free, featuring the new acoustic song "FUCKMYLIFE666" and the namesake "True Trans Soul Rebel". On August 29, 2013, Inge Johansson, formerly of the (International) Noise Conspiracy and Refused, was confirmed as the new bass player.

On January 21, 2014, Against Me! released Transgender Dysphoria Blues, their sixth full-length studio album. The album was praised for its raw quality, reminiscent of Against Me!'s earlier music. It is their highest-charting album to date, reaching no. 23 on the Billboard 200.

A new live album, 23 Live Sex Acts was recorded on the subsequent tour by the band in 2014, and was released on September 4, 2015.

In July 2016, the band announced their seventh studio album Shape Shift with Me would be released on September 16. The band also immediately released a song from the album, "333". On August 10, 2016, a second song, "Haunting, Haunted, Haunts" was released via the Adult Swim Singles Program 2016. On September 8, the entire album was available for streaming. Shape Shift with Me, was released September 16, 2016.

In October 2017, Against Me! played a special show with former bassist Dustin Fridkin for the first time since his departure from the band in 2002. The show was part of FEST 16. Grace revealed in August 2018 that she strongly considered disbanding Against Me! once this show had occurred.

=== 2018–2020: Seward's return and 2 Nights / 4 Records / 48 Songs tour ===
Against Me! played their final show with bassist Inge Johansson in May 2018. The following month, the band played an unannounced show at Trumbullplex in Detroit, MI. The show was notable for being the first show with Andrew Seward playing bass since 2013, although no songs were played from Shape Shift with Me. Grace officially announced in July 2018 via Instagram that after performing these shows, Seward had rejoined the band.

In October 2018, the band played two shows on the eve of their South American tour: one with As the Eternal Cowboy played front to back, and the other with New Wave.

Laura Jane Grace announced in July 2018 that the band she had performed previous solo tours with since 2016, the Devouring Mothers, had recently completed a record together. Bought to Rot was released on Bloodshot Records on November 9, 2018. The band's members since its inception have been Grace and Willard from Against Me!, as well as long-time producer and collaborator Marc Hudson. The album is said to be heavily influenced by the works of Rowland S. Howard and Tom Petty, and includes collaborations with other artists.

Grace later confirmed that Against Me! was still continuing as a band, with a "clean slate", and that an eighth Against Me! record was still planned for eventual release. However, she also noted that it could be either shelved or re-recorded, following Seward's replacement of Johansson as bassist.

The band recorded a cover of The Jim Carroll Band's "People Who Died" for a 2018 compilation album (Songs That Saved My Life) in aid of mental health charities. The track was the first recording with Seward back as bassist since their 2011 single "Russian Spies / Occult Enemies", and Grace used the announcement to further confirm that the band intend to record an eighth studio album together. The band began work on their eighth studio album in February 2019.

In May 2019, the band announced their "2 Nights / 4 Records / 48 Songs" tour. On this North American run, the band performed two shows in each city: The first dedicated to Searching for a Former Clarity and New Wave, the second dedicated to White Crosses and Transgender Dysphoria Blues. Support for the shows came from Chuck Ragan, Toy Guitar, Dilly Dally, Chris Cresswell, and Cursive. The band played its final show to date on March 12, 2020, at the Port City Music Hall – in turn, becoming the final band to ever perform there, due to the venue's closure later that year on account of the COVID-19 pandemic.

=== 2020–present: Hiatus ===
Grace released a solo album entitled Stay Alive in 2020, as well as an EP entitled At War with the Silverfish in 2021. Bowman began working as a guitar tech on tour with My Chemical Romance, while Seward formed the duo Nighttime Flyers and released a self-titled album independently in April 2022. Seward also joined As Friends Rust, initially as a touring and session musician, but ultimately becoming an official member and performing on their 2023 album Any Joy and their 2024 EP Lightless. Willard formed a new band, Plosivs, with members of Drive Like Jehu and Pinback. They released their debut self-titled album in March 2022. He also served as a touring drummer for both The Bronx and Worriers throughout 2022, and was announced as the new permanent drummer of Alkaline Trio in 2023 – a role he would hold until 2026.

In February 2024, while promoting her second solo album, Hole in My Head, Grace confirmed that Against Me! was still on hiatus as a result of the COVID-19 pandemic: "We never broke up, but the pandemic fucked us up. It killed our momentum. It made apparent that there was a point of burnout. So that's where we've been – everyone stepped away. People started doing other things and it got weird. I'm one person in the equation, and because I'm still out here playing the songs and putting out records and doing interviews, I'm always put to task to answer for it all. All I'm ever trying to do is demonstrate that I still want to do it. I go out every night and I still feel attached to the music and I still love playing music. I can't speak for the other people, I can only speak for myself."

Grace, however, remained optimistic that the band would reunite in the future after she and her bandmates had reconnected at her wedding the year before: "I don't want to jinx anything. We'll just have to see. But we didn't break up, it just got weird. We'll play again, I have faith in that. I just don't know when that'll be."

== Band members ==
=== Last known lineup ===
- Laura Jane Grace – lead vocals, rhythm guitar (1997–2020), bass (1997–2000, 2002, 2013), lead guitar (1997–2001)
- James Bowman – lead guitar, backing vocals (2000, 2000–2001, 2001–2020)
- Andrew Seward – bass, backing vocals (2002–2013, 2018–2020)
- Atom Willard – drums, percussion (2013–2020)

=== Former ===
- Kevin Mahon – drums, percussion, backing vocals (1998–2001)
- Dustin Fridkin – bass, backing vocals (1998, 2000–2002)
- Warren Oakes – drums, percussion, backing vocals (2001–2009)
- George Rebelo – drums, percussion, backing vocals (2009–2010)
- Jay Weinberg – drums, percussion (2010–2012)
- Inge Johansson – bass, backing vocals (2013–2018)

=== Touring ===
- Franz Nicolay – piano, keyboards, accordion, backing vocals (2010)
- Tyson Yerex – piano, keyboards, guitar (2009–2010)
- Adam Trachsel – bass (2010)
- Dustin Fridkin – bass, backing vocals (2017)

== Accolades ==
Year	Association	Category	Nominated work	Result	Ref
2015	GLAAD Media Awards	Outstanding Music Artist	Transgender Dysphoria Blues	Won	
2016	Libera Awards	Best Live Act	Themselves	Nominated	
2017	GLAAD Media Award	Outstanding Music Artist	Shape Shift with Me	Nominated	

== Discography ==
Studio albums

- Against Me! Is Reinventing Axl Rose (2002)
- Against Me! as the Eternal Cowboy (2003)
- Searching for a Former Clarity (2005)
- New Wave (2007)
- White Crosses (2010)
- Transgender Dysphoria Blues (2014)
- Shape Shift with Me (2016)
