= Warren Oakes =

American drummer (born 1981)

- Born: William Warren Oakes; January 23, 1981 (age 44); Gainesville, Florida, U.S.
- Origin: Sarasota, Florida, U.S.
- Genres: Folk punk, punk rock
- Occupations: Restaurateur, musician, drummer
- Instruments: drums, percussion
- Years active: 2001- present
- Labels: No Idea, Fat Wreck Chords, Sire

William Warren Oakes (born January 23, 1981) is an American drummer best known for his eight years spent as the drummer for the punk rock band Against Me!.

On June 8, 2009, Oakes announced that he was leaving the band to pursue a career as a restaurateur. He is now a part owner of Boca Fiesta, a restaurant located in Gainesville, Florida that focuses on the fusion of southern and Mexican cuisine, as well as a venue space, The Backyard, that houses music shows, dance nights, and many more events.

Oakes is also well known for popularizing the freeganism movement, with the publication of his zine, Why Freegan?

Oakes formed the band Sunshine State along with Troy Perlman, Mike Magarelli and Kyle Flick in 2013. With the release of their first album Pour in 2014, Oakes gave an interview with Punk News where he spoke about the changes to a new career, new band, and their upcoming performances.

On March 5, 2022 SPIN magazine wrote an article to commemorate the 20th anniversary of the Against Me! album Reinventing Axl Rose saying: "It’s the transformative folk-punk album’s 20th birthday."

Oakes responded to the magazine's publication by saying: "Had a nice little trip down memory lane doing an interview for, and reading, this incredibly in-depth oral history of a very fun time in my life. Happy 20th Axl, I’ll buy you your very first pint of Guinness for your 21st next year!"

== Discography ==
Year of Release	Title	Label	Charts
2002	Reinventing Axl Rose	No Idea Records	
2003	As the Eternal Cowboy	Fat Wreck Chords	#36 Independent Albums
2005	Searching for a Former Clarity	Fat Wreck Chords	#114 US #1 Heatseeker #9 Independent Albums
2007	New Wave	Sire Records	#57 US
2008	STOP - Rock the vote version	Sire Records	-
