= James Bowman (musician) =

American musician (born 1980)

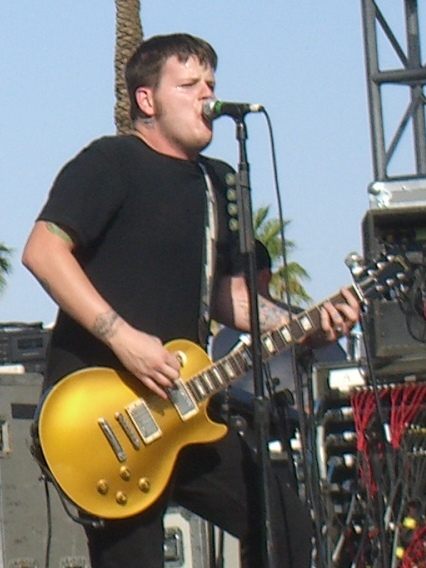
- Bowman performing with Against Me! in 2007

Background information
- Born: James Robert Bowman; May 14, 1980 (age 46); St. Petersburg, FL
- Origin: Gainesville, Florida, United States
- Genres: Punk rock, folk punk
- Occupations: Musician, songwriter, singer, guitarist
- Instruments: Vocals, Guitar
- Years active: 1990s–present
- Labels: No Idea, Sabot, Fat Wreck Chords, Sire, Total Treble
- Formerly of: Against Me!
- Website: www.againstme.net

James Robert Bowman (born May 14, 1980) is an American musician best known as the lead guitarist and backing vocalist of the punk rock band Against Me!. Starting as a solo act in 1997, Against Me! eventually expanded into a quartet, having currently released seven studio albums.

== Biography ==
=== Early life ===
Bowman moved around frequently during his childhood, living briefly in Louisiana and Virginia. As a teenager, he lived in St. Petersburg, Florida, where he played in his first band, the $cam$. Although the $cam$ didn't get very much recognition outside of St. Petersburg, they did release a self-titled record, which can be found on the internet. Bowman is fairly shy and rarely talks about his childhood. He is the youngest (older sister Bonnie) child to a single mother, and has very little memory of his father, who died when James was aged two. Bowman attended Naples High School where he met Laura Jane Grace on the first day of freshman year in 1994. They soon dropped out of high school to play in punk bands. The two of them have remained close friends to this day.

=== 2000–2004: Against Me!'s early years ===
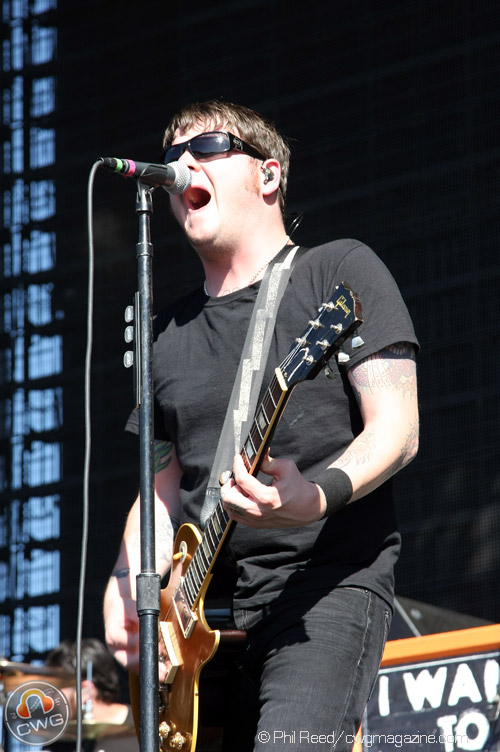
Bowman in 2010

In 2000, Grace convinced Bowman to move to Gainesville and began teaching him how to play Against Me! songs on guitar. They made a deal; Bowman could come on tour if he'd buy the guitar strings; which he agreed. Bowman first went on tour with Against Me! in 2000 shortly after the release of their self titled EP. It was a month and a half long tour which ended with car trouble. It was at this point Bowman left the band, though he returned several months later just after the recording of Crime as Forgiven by Against Me!. On April 23, 2001; while traveling south on I-75, heading home from their first tour as a 4-piece band, their van was hit by a semi truck. They landed upside down in a ditch. No one was harmed but the van and equipment were destroyed. Bowman and [Kevin] Mahon, (drummer at the time) left the band. The band actually broke up for several months that year. Grace and [Dustin] Fridkin played as a duo for a brief time. Eventually Warren Oakes joined the band, and Bowman returned in December 2001 during the recording of Reinventing Axl Rose. In 2002, Bowman starred in a short film entitled, Boredom, with a few other friends. It was shot on location in Gainesville, FL. In 2003, As the Eternal Cowboy was released, followed by a tour documentary in 2004.

=== 2005–2010: Searching.., New Wave, and White Crosses ===
In September 2005, Searching for a Former Clarity was released. 3 months later, the band was signed to Sire Records. New Wave was released in 2007. In the summer of 2009, Warren Oakes left the band to open a restaurant. He was replaced by George Rebelo.White Crosses was released in June 2010. In September 2010, the band suddenly cancelled tour dates and eventually left Sire." Jay Weinberg joined the band in December, and they went on tour again.

=== 2011 – present ===
On June 3, 2011, Against Me! announced that they started their own record label, Total Treble Music. In November 2011, the band started working on "new material" for the next album. It turned out to be a false start, they scrapped it and went on tour. They started recording the album again in February 2012 at Total Treble Studio, with Grace taking complete creative control, acting as both recording engineer and record producer for the album. In May 2012, Grace publicly came out as transgender. Bowman recalled that "he wasn't really surprised" when Grace came out, because when he thought about it, "the signs had always been there, especially if you listen to the lyrics". In June 2012, Bowman threw the first pitch at a Ray's baseball game. Weinberg left the band in December 2012. He was eventually replaced by Atom Willard. Andrew Seward left the band in 2013, he was replaced by Inge Johansson, though Seward would return in 2018.

== Personal life ==
Bowman has been married to Vanessa Burt since November 2007. They have one child, Hollis, born April 10, 2012.

== Discography ==
=== With Against Me! ===
Studio albums

- Against Me! Is Reinventing Axl Rose (2002)
- Against Me! as the Eternal Cowboy (2003)
- Searching for a Former Clarity (2005)
- New Wave (2007)
- White Crosses (2010)
- Transgender Dysphoria Blues (2014)
- Shape Shift with Me (2016)

Live albums

- 23 Live Sex Acts (2015)

Demo albums

- The Original Cowboy (2009)
- Total Clarity (2011)
- Black Crosses (2011)

Singles

- "The Disco Before The Breakdown" (2002)

=== The $cam$ ===
- Self titled CD

All lyrics are written by The $cam$; all music is composed by The $cam$.

The $cam$ self titled
No.	Title	Length
1.	"Burn Down the White House"	1:55
2.	"Just Like Family"
3.	"Barred Windows"
4.	"Prejudices Burn"
5.	""Real" Man"
6.	"Kill For Control"
7.	"Placebo"
8.	"Open Your Eyes"
9.	"Poison Ivy"
10.	"I'm Drunk " Oi! Oi!""
11.	"So What? (Anti nowhere league)"
Total length:		21:46
