= No Idea Records =

Record label

- Founded: 1985
- Genre: Punk rock
- Country of origin: U.S.
- Location: Gainesville, Florida
- Official website: www.noidearecords.com

No Idea Records is an American independent record label based in Gainesville, Florida which focuses on punk rock and its related sub-genres. The label produces both vinyl records and compact discs.

No Idea Records started not as a record label, but as a zine in 1985, published independently by Var Thelin and Ken Coffelt and some friends of theirs from high school. By the seventh issue in 1989, Var was running the zine with Sarah Dyer and other contributors and collaborators. Starting with the sixth edition, the No Idea zine included 7-inch records with each issue. The first featured a local Gainesville band called Doldrums, and the second was a split 7-inch, one side of which belonged to later Bay Area legends Crimpshrine, a major influence on the musical style which dominates No Idea to the present.

Since its beginnings, No Idea has remained a foundation of the Gainesville punk scene and is considered by many to have spawned its very own style of punk, sometimes half-jokingly referred to as "beard punk" or "beardcore" due to the large proportion of members in bands having beards, or more commonly as variations of emo, post-hardcore and pop punk. The label has also worked with grindcore and metalcore bands like Left for Dead, Acrid, Bombs of Death, Crucible and The Swarm aka Knee Deep in the Dead.

== Artists ==
- Against Me!
- Alkaline Trio
- Ampere
- Assholeparade
- Atom & His Package
- Bridge and Tunnel
- Cheap Girls
- Chuck Ragan
- Coalesce
- Combatwoundedveteran
- Dead Bars
- Defiance, Ohio
- Dillinger Four
- The Draft
- The Ergs!
- Fifth Hour Hero
- Floor
- Good Luck
- Hot Water Music
- I Hate Myself
- J Church
- Jawbreaker
- Jud Jud
- Latterman
- Leatherface
- Lemuria
- Less Than Jake
- Me First and the Gimme Gimmes
- Moonraker
- Mustard Plug
- New Mexican Disaster Squad
- No Friends
- Off With Their Heads
- Paul Baribeau
- Planes Mistaken for Stars
- Radon
- Rehasher
- Riverboat Gamblers
- Rumbleseat
- Samiam
- Seaweed
- Shores
- Small Brown Bike
- Strike Anywhere
- Sunshine State
- This Bike Is a Pipe Bomb
- Tomorrow
- Twelve Hour Turn
- Western Addiction
- A Wilhelm Scream
- Worn in Red

== Compilations ==
- V/A – Back to Donut!
- V/A – Bread: The Edible Napkin
- V/A – Down in Front
- V/A – Read Army Faction
- V/A – No Idea 100: Redefiling Music
- V/A – Tour Diary
- V/A – Sight and Sound: The History of the Future
- V/A – The Shape of Flakes to Come

== See also ==
- List of record labels
