= Laura Jane Grace =

American punk rock singer (born 1980)

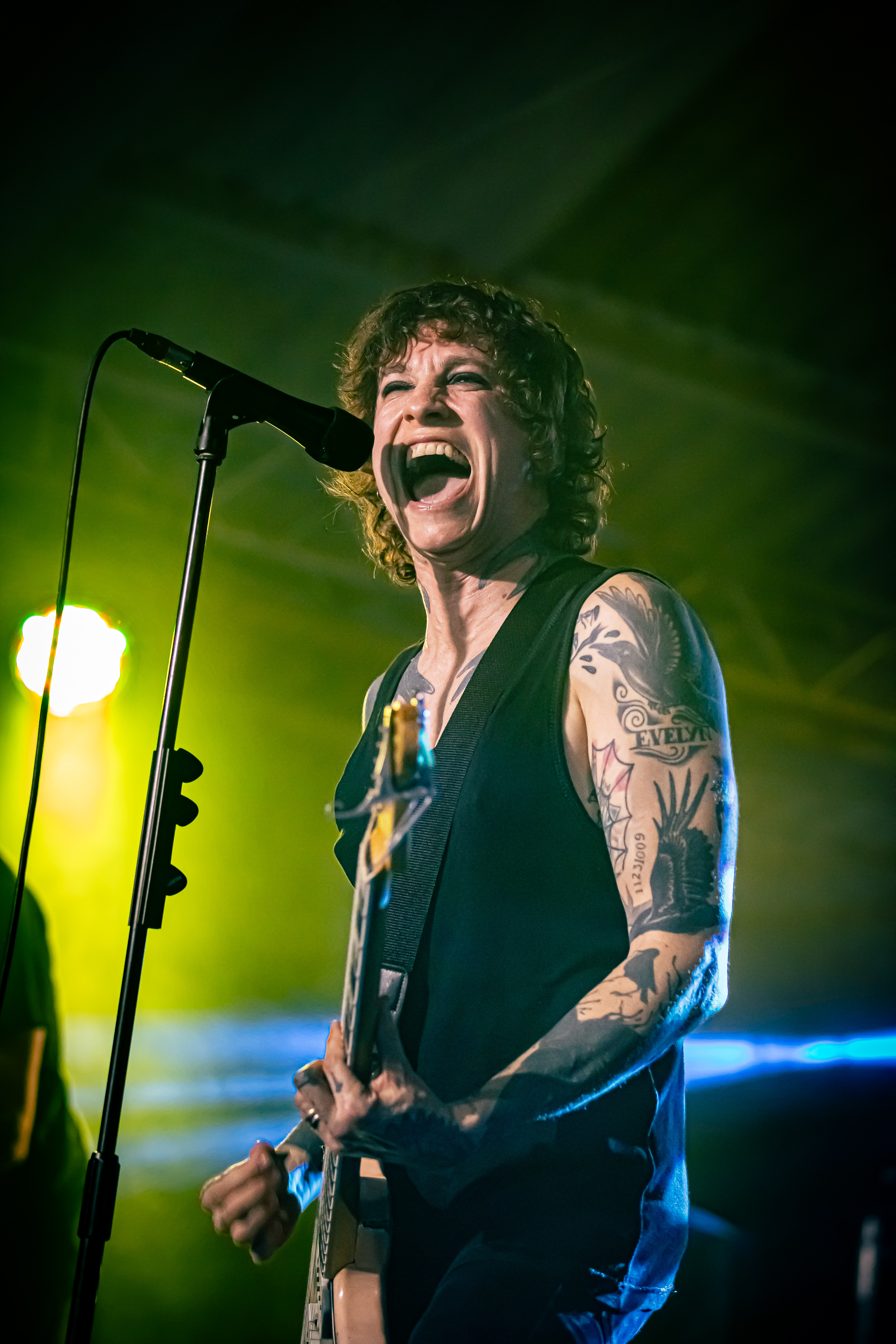
- Grace performing in 2024
- Born: Thomas James Gabel; November 8, 1980 (age 46); Fort Benning, Georgia, U.S.
- Spouses: Tiffany Danielle Kay (m. 2000; div. 2004); Heather Hannoura (m. 2007; div. 2013); Paris Campbell (m. 2023; sep. 2025)
- Children: 1
- Musical career
- Origin: Gainesville, Florida, U.S.
- Genre: Punk rock
- Occupations: Singer; songwriter; guitarist
- Instruments: Vocals; guitar; bass; drums; synthesizer; harmonica
- Years active: 1990s–present
- Labels: Misanthrope; Crasshole; Plan-It-X; No Idea; Sabot; Fat Wreck Chords; Sire; Total Treble; Bloodshot; Red Scare Industries; Polyvinyl Record Co.
- Member of: Laura Jane Grace in the Trauma Tropes
- Formerly of: Against Me!; Laura Jane Grace & the Devouring Mothers, The Adversaries, Common Affliction
- Website: laurajanegrace.com

Laura Jane Grace (born Thomas James Gabel; November 8, 1980) is an American musician, singer, and songwriter, best known as the founder, lead singer, songwriter, and rhythm guitarist of the punk rock band Against Me!. In addition to Against Me!, Grace fronts the band Laura Jane Grace & the Devouring Mothers, a solo project she started in 2016. Grace is notable for being one of the first highly visible punk rock musicians to publicly come out as transgender, which she did in May 2012. She released her first solo studio album since transitioning, Stay Alive, in 2020, followed by Hole in My Head in 2024.

== Early life ==
Grace was born in Fort Benning, Georgia, the eldest child of United States Army Major Thomas Gabel and Bonnie Gabel (née Grace). Grace has a brother named Mark, who is six years younger. The family moved frequently between military bases due to their father's military career, living briefly in Fort Hood, Texas; Pennsylvania; Ohio; Germany; and at a NATO post in Naples, Italy, during the Gulf War. When she was 8 years old while living in Italy, Grace bought her first guitar from Sears mail order with money saved from mowing lawns. Grace initially took guitar lessons from an army officer's wife, but ended up teaching herself how to play.

When she was 12 years old, Grace's parents had an acrimonious divorce, which led to Grace and her brother moving with their mom from Naples, Italy – where their father remained – to Naples, Florida, to live with their maternal grandmother. In contrast to her time in Italy, Grace has said that moving to Florida was a difficult adjustment. Constantly bullied at school, Grace was drinking alcohol and taking drugs by age 13, substances which included pot, LSD, and cocaine. Grace was arrested for possession of marijuana at 14 and went on to struggle with addiction for years. Grace also regularly skipped school, eventually dropping out of high school.

Grace has suffered from depression, attributing her "first memorable bout" to feelings of gender dysphoria after her first sexual relationship. She also noted that depression occurs in both sides of her family, with her grandmother (also called Grace) being admitted to hospital regularly.

While in junior high school Grace became a fan of punk rock, attracted to the nihilistic and anarchistic ideals of the genre. At age 13, she played bass in her first band, known as both the Black Shadows and the Leather Dice as they had never agreed on a name. The band was formed with members of her youth group at church. Their first gigs were at church talent shows playing Nirvana and Pearl Jam covers.

An arrest at age 14 crystallized her aversion to authority: having gone to the beach on Independence Day 1995 to watch fireworks, "I walked up on the boardwalk, and a cop was like 'Hey, get off the boardwalk; you're blocking the flow of traffic'. So I turned around and got off, and he came up to me again and was like, 'Get off the boardwalk.' And I was like 'I'm off the boardwalk.'" Grace said she was then slammed into a police car, thrown face-first to the pavement, jumped on, hogtied, put in a holding cell, and not allowed to call her mother. She was charged with resisting arrest and battery, placed under house arrest for the summer, and required to do 180 hours of community service. Grace said her arrest and charges were all because "I was a dirty, grubby little punk kid with black spiky hair who hadn't washed his pants in a year." Grace's mother, who could ill afford to hire an attorney, hired one who took the case to court and lost. Grace was charged as an adult and ultimately convicted of both felonies. Grace later said the experience "changed my life. [It] politicized me." "I have an inherent distrust of mankind. I think authority and government base their power on violence. I refuse to recognize anyone's power over me."

After that incident, Grace came to identify with British anarcho-punk band Crass, calling them "to me, the best band to ever blend music and politics": "I felt like Crass' music legitimately made a change. They really backed up what they were doing. I saw that writing a song against something was just as valid as standing on a street corner holding a sign."

Grace befriended James Bowman when they met on their first day of freshman year at Naples High School; the two have been close ever since. "We were both punk rock kids with spiky hair and more belts than necessary", recalls Bowman. "We just hung out and smoked pot and did normal kid things." Grace's first tattoo—a Crass logo on the right ankle—was done by Bowman, though she later covered it up with a tattoo of the Rebel Alliance symbol because Bowman had been drunk and inked it sloppily.

At age 16, Grace published a zine called "Misanthrope", which dealt mostly with political issues of the time. The "highlight of her career" was interviewing Bobby Seale.

Grace played bass in a band called the Adversaries with Dustin Fridkin and a "revolving cast" of drummers from 1994 to 1996. The lineups were not stable, and the band had various names, including the Snot Rockets, Upper Crust, and eventually the Adversaries. The Adversaries released one (obscure) demo. Their "crowning achievement as a band" (according to Grace) was playing at "The Hardback" in Gainesville, Florida. The breakup of the Adversaries led to Grace briefly playing in a band called Common Affliction in 1996. The ending of Common Affliction led to Grace recording the first Against Me! demo tape in December 1996.

== Career ==
In 1997, at age 17, Grace dropped out of high school and began writing songs, naming the musical project Against Me!. Moving to Gainesville, Florida, at 18, she began performing as Against Me!, either alone on an acoustic guitar or with friend Kevin Mahon accompanying by drumming on pickle buckets. Her songs drew influence from early acoustic protest music, covering topics such as class struggle. Early Against Me! shows were played at dive bars, laundromats, and anywhere else that would allow Grace to perform, to audiences of a few or even zero. Making ends meet by working odd jobs, dumpster diving, selling blood plasma, and living in a low-rent house with twelve roommates across the street from an experimental waste dump, Grace also volunteered with nonprofit socialist groups such as Food Not Bombs. She was arrested again at 18 for obstruction of justice and resisting arrest without violence: "I was picking up [Mahon]. He was like, 'Pop the trunk—I want to throw some stuff in there.' I was waiting in the car and I saw two cop cars come up behind me. I got out and they had my friend on the ground. I went up to the first officer I saw and said, 'Excuse me, officer, what's going on?' He's like, 'Down on the ground—you're going to jail.' I started to ask another question and he grabbed me, slammed me into the cop car, and arrested me."

In 2000, Grace convinced Bowman to move to Gainesville and began teaching him how to play Against Me! songs on guitar. After some early EP releases, Against Me! developed into a full band consisting of Grace, Bowman, bassist Dustin Fridkin, and drummer Warren Oakes. Their debut album, Against Me! Is Reinventing Axl Rose, was released in 2002 through local independent record label No Idea Records. With Fridkin replaced by Andrew Seward, the band signed to DIY indie record label Fat Wreck Chords for 2003's Against Me! as the Eternal Cowboy and 2005's Searching for a Former Clarity. The name As the Eternal Cowboy was symbolic of the old fashioned concept of the Western cowboy, always wandering the plains lost and lonely. It was envisioned by Grace as a concept record about love and war. Searching sold over 65,000 copies and was their first album to chart on the Billboard 200, reaching 114. Against Me! supported it with a tour of all 50 U.S. states.

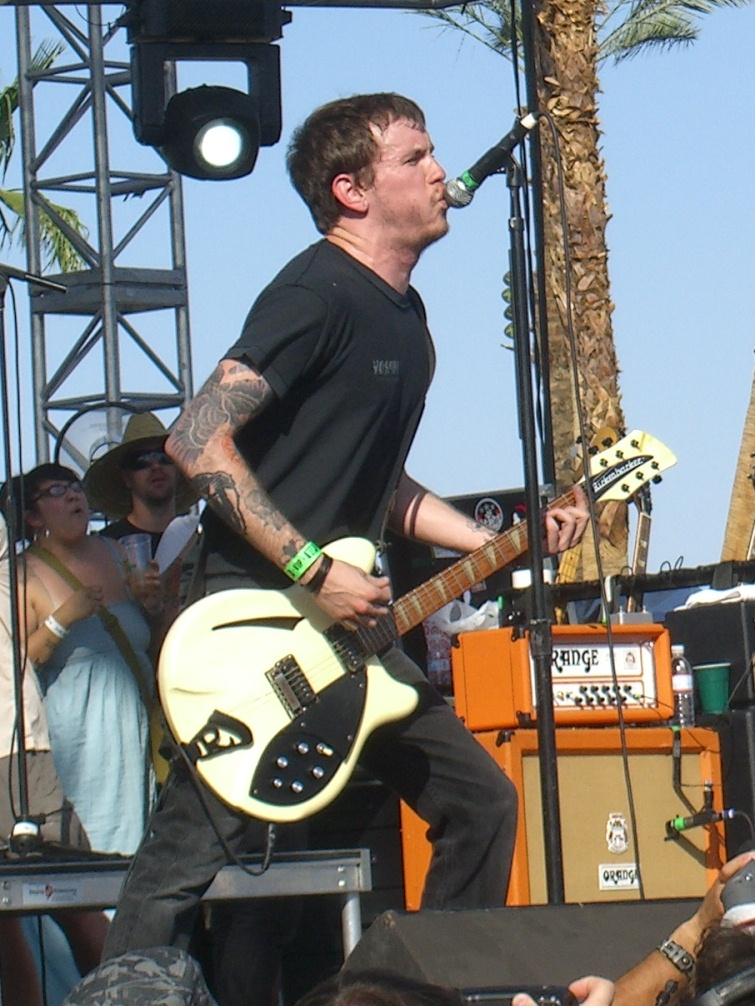
Against Me! at the 2007 Coachella Valley Music and Arts Festival

As Against Me!'s popularity increased, Grace felt alienated from the male-centric punk scene: "With the band especially, I felt more and more like I was putting on an act – like I was being shoved into this role of 'angry white man in a punk band.'" The stresses of the band's tour schedule, coupled with going through a divorce at age 24, contributed to her addiction: "I was just getting fucked up all the time: drinking, drugs, whatever. I felt unhealthy and depressed about so many things". Throughout this time Grace made oblique references to gender dysphoria in song lyrics, including "The Disco Before the Breakdown" ("I know they're going to laugh at us / when they see us out together 'holding hands' like this"), "Violence" ("You've been keeping secrets ... Nothing but shame and paranoia"), and "Searching for a Former Clarity" ("In the journal you kept by the side of your bed ... confessing childhood secrets of dressing up in women's clothes / Compulsions you never knew the reasons to"). To help escape the stress and depression, Grace spent 18 months living in hotels on the outskirts of Gainesville while writing the next Against Me! album.

=== 2006–2011 ===
In December 2005, Against Me! signed to Sire Records, a subsidiary of the Warner Music Group. With increased mainstream exposure, Grace swore off cross-dressing and other expressions of femininity: "You go through periods of binging and purging. I was 25, we were about to go on a long period of touring, and I was like, 'That's it. I'm getting rid of all this. I'm male, and that's it.'"

Against Me!'s first major-label album, 2007's New Wave, brought the band mainstream success: It debuted at no. 57 on the Billboard 200; featured their first charting single, "Thrash Unreal", which reached no. 11 on Billboard's Modern Rock Tracks chart; and was named as Spin's album of the year. The song "The Ocean" directly referenced Grace's gender dysphoria, with the lyrics "If I could have chosen, I would have been born a woman / My mother once told me she would have named me Laura / I would grow up to be strong and beautiful like her / One day I'd find an honest man to make my husband". Though Grace anticipated "completely outing myself" with the song, no one involved with the band seemed to pick up on the lyrics' literal meaning. She also wanted to cross-dress in the music video for "Thrash Unreal", but the label's A&R representative vetoed the idea.

In August 2007, Grace was arrested in Tallahassee, Florida, on charges of battery, following a confrontation with a coffee shop patron after Grace tore down an article about Against Me! that had been hung up and defaced to mock the band. Grace allegedly knocked a cup out of the man's hand, then forced his head into the wooden counter. She admitted to intentionally knocking over the cup but denied hitting the man, and was released on bail the following morning. "We were playing at this place The Beta Bar," she said, "and this coffee shop next door was having a protest show against ours. I mean... go protest the fucking war!"

Grace's solo EP, Heart Burns, was released in October 2008. Timed to coincide with that year's United States presidential election, the EP's songs addressed the country's political and economic climate, criticizing presidential candidate John McCain and the trial of environmental activist Eric McDavid. "I wanted to do something that was the complete opposite of New Wave in the sense of approach", she said. "I didn't want to really think about it. I didn't want to obsess about anything. I just wanted to go in and play songs. I wanted to record because it'll be fun, and that's what this is supposed to be about." Grace supported the EP by performing on The Revival Tour with Chuck Ragan of Hot Water Music, Tim Barry of Avail, and Ben Nichols of Lucero.

Against Me!'s fifth studio album, White Crosses, was released in 2010 and became their most successful, reaching no. 34 on the Billboard 200. By that September, however, Grace began taking week-long writing trips alone, checking into hotels dressed as a woman and writing a concept album titled Transgender Dysphoria Blues, about a transsexual prostitute. The record was positively received.

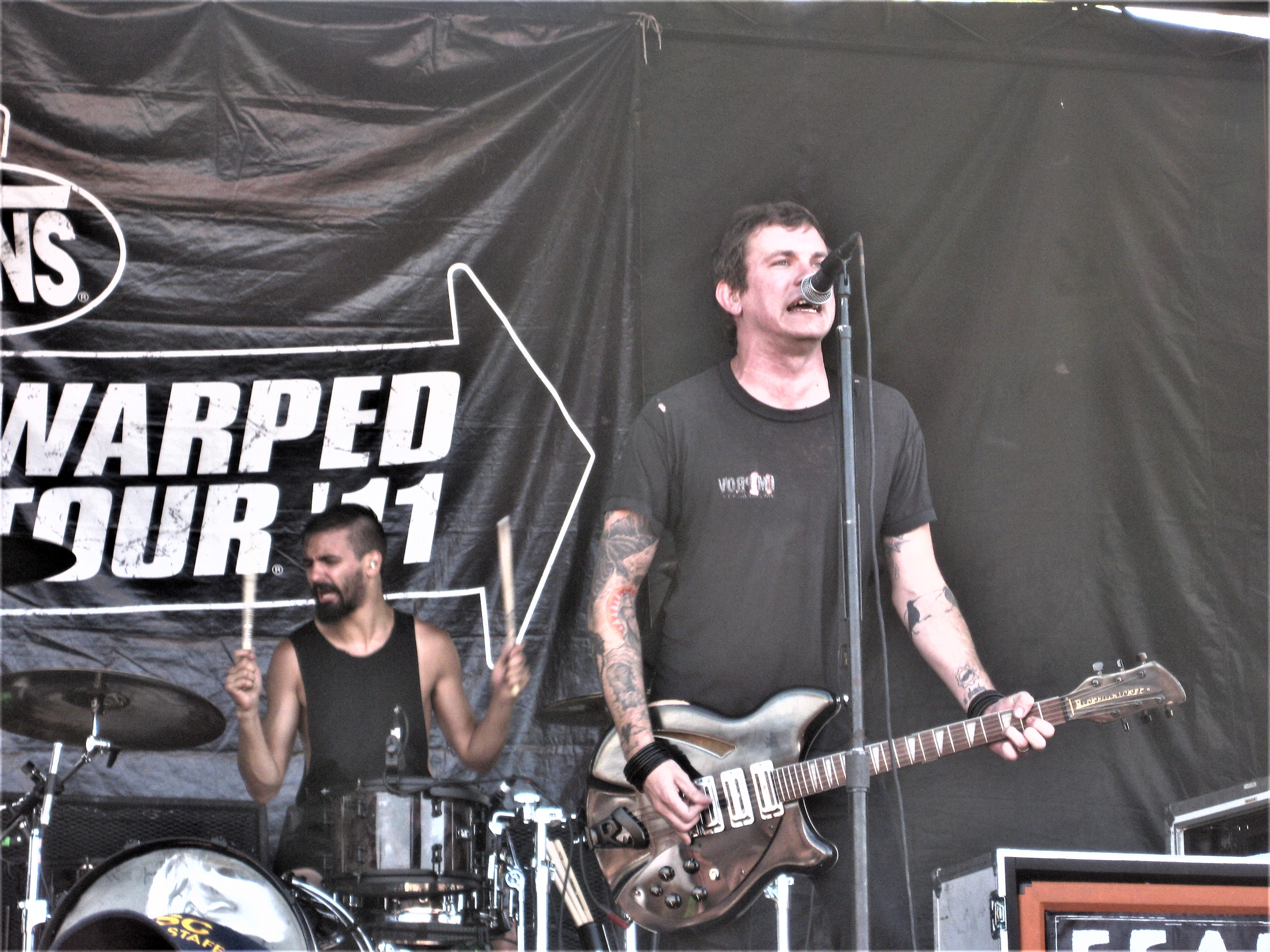
Against Me! performing on the 2011 Warped Tour in Chula Vista, California

Against Me! cancelled a series of tour dates in October and November 2010 due to "a culmination of circumstances engulfing us", and left Sire/Warner.

In 2011, Grace purchased an abandoned post office in Elkton, Florida, converted it into a recording studio called Total Treble and launched an accompanying record label for future Against Me! releases, Total Treble Music. The first album recorded at the studio was Cheap Girls' Giant Orange (2012), which also marked Grace's first experience as a record producer. Total Treble Studio closed in 2013 after being destroyed in a storm.

=== 2012–present ===
In spring 2012, Grace performed on the Revival Tour with Chuck Ragan and Cory Branan.

In July 2018, it was announced that Grace would release an album in the fall of 2018 under the name "Laura Jane Grace & the Devouring Mothers" on Chicago-based Bloodshot Records. The record, Bought to Rot, was made with bassist Marc Jacob Hudson and drummer Atom Willard (Against Me!, Angels & Airwaves, The Offspring). The release included a tour with a three night weekly residency in Chicago.

Grace released Stay Alive in 2020, her debut solo studio album. The album was written and recorded during the COVID-19 pandemic, when Grace was left without the ability to record with her band Against Me!, and thus made a solo album instead. The album was recorded over three days in Steve Albini's studio in Chicago. Stay Alive was released as a surprise album with no promotion. While touring, Grace wrote her second solo album, Hole In My Head. The eponymous lead single was released in October 2023, with the b-side Dysphoria Hoodie. The album was released in February 2024.

Towards the end of 2023, Grace recorded six songs with Matt Patton, Mikey Erg, and her wife Paris Campbell Grace. These songs were released as the EP Give an Inch by "Laura Jane Grace & The Mississippi Medicals".

== Writing ==
In 2015, Grace wrote a column called "Mandatory Happiness" for the Vice Media publication Noisey.

On November 15, 2016, Grace's memoir Tranny: Confessions Of Punk Rock's Most Infamous Anarchist Sellout, co-written with Noisey editor Dan Ozzi, was published. Much of the book is based on Grace's journals, which she had kept since third grade. The book was known under a working title of Kill Me Loudly or Killing Me Loudly in 2015, when Grace was working with a different publisher.

== Other work ==
Grace participated in a ten-part documentary called True Trans where she interviewed "gender variant people from all walks of life" to allow them to tell their stories, in addition to telling hers. In 2015, the show was nominated for an Emmy for New Approaches: Arts, Lifestyle, Culture.

== Personal life ==
In a 2007 interview with SPIN, Grace said that she had married Tiffany Kay in 2000, when Grace was 19 years old. The marriage ended in divorce four years later in 2004. In March 2006, while touring as an opening act for Alkaline Trio, Grace met visual artist Heather Hannoura, who designed merchandise for Alkaline Trio and other bands. The two spent the summer together on the Warped Tour, began living together, and got tattoos of each other's names. They married in December 2007, after a year-long engagement. Grace and Hannoura have a daughter, Evelyn, born in 2009. Grace's feelings of dysphoria "started coming back really strong" about the time Hannoura became pregnant that February, but she refrained from acting on them for a year. The family moved to St. Augustine, Florida, in 2010, when Evelyn was about a year old. The couple separated and then divorced in 2013, shortly after Grace came out as transgender.

Grace married comedian and content creator Paris Campbell in December 2023, after having met the month before. The couple separated in July 2025, following allegations of emotional abuse from both parties.

In 2006, Grace became a vegan.

Grace has lived in Chicago since 2013. She released a song titled "I Hate Chicago" in 2018, that satirised and criticised many aspects of the city.

=== Political views and activism ===
Grace has said that she is an anarchist. After leaving Naples, Italy, and moving to Naples, Florida, Grace said that she discovered punk rock music around the age of 13. Around the age of 15 or 16 years old, Grace said that she also discovered the anarcho-punk and activist punk rock movements, which she found appealing for its feminist and anti-hate stance against racism, homophobia, and its embrace of body liberation. Grace said she has been influenced by these concepts as core values since learning about them. A band that Grace cites frequently as an example of politics and music is Crass, an English art collective and punk rock band formed in 1977. However, as Against Me! became more successful, the constraints of the punk rock scene, which often had rigid sets of rules, were difficult to embrace, especially during the times when Grace was struggling with gender dysphoria.

The Against Me! song "Stop!" was part of the Rock the Vote campaign to encourage voting in the 2008 US presidential election.

At a May 2016 Against Me! show in Durham, North Carolina, Grace set her birth certificate on fire in protest of the North Carolina bathroom bill. Grace said "Goodbye gender" during this act of protest.

In 2020, Grace played at a fundraiser for Bernie Sanders's campaign for the 2020 Democratic Party presidential primaries. She additionally performed at Sanders's "Fighting Oligarchy: Where We Go From Here" tour on March 7, 2025. Her performance of the song "Your God (God's Dick)" created controversy, as right-wing commentators and news outlets described the song as "anti-Christian". In response, Grace defended herself and the song's message, stating, "That song is the most relevant song I have right now to everything that's going on." The song was performed in protest to "president Donald Trump and Republican lawmakers’ proposed plans to cut federal programs like Medicare and Medicaid that low-income families rely on."

=== Transition ===
The cliché is that you're a woman trapped in a man's body, but it's not that simple. It's a feeling of detachment from your body and from yourself. And it's shitty, man. It's really fucking shitty.

— Grace, describing gender dysphoria in 2012

I would describe it as a feeling of misalignment. Where the gender you feel (internally) doesn't match up with your assigned gender at birth. When you're too young to know what it is, it turns into shame.

— Grace, describing gender dysphoria in 2014

Grace experienced feelings of gender dysphoria from a young age, citing them as her "earliest memories". Grace publicly came out as a transgender woman in May 2012 in an article to Rolling Stone. Grace announced plans to begin transitioning. Having been inspired to come out after meeting a transgender Against Me! fan, Grace had informed the rest of the band that February. In 2012, she began publicly using the name Laura Jane Grace. "Laura" is the name her mother would have chosen had she been assigned female at birth, "Jane" was selected simply because she thinks it is pretty, and "Grace" is her mother's maiden name. On continuing to perform in Against Me!, Grace said, "However fierce our band was in the past, imagine me, six-foot-two, in heels, fucking screaming into someone's face."

In her 2012 interview with Rolling Stone, Grace revealed plans to take hormones and undergo electrolysis. She said she was also considering surgery. She expressed apprehension about chondrolaryngoplasty and bottom surgery, saying, "I don't give a fuck if I lose my penis. It's just fucking scary because of the surgery. I've needed to have my wisdom teeth removed for five years, and I still haven't." She said that she would live as a woman and undergo psychotherapy for a year before considering gender-affirming surgery: "Right now, I'm in this awkward transition period. I look like a dude, and feel like a dude, and it sucks. But eventually I'll flip, and I'll present as female." In 2015, Grace stated, "I think it's perfectly valid [for a trans person] to never undergo bottom surgery".

In response to Grace's announcement, a number of figures in the punk community voiced their support, including musicians Brian Fallon, Brendan Kelly, Franz Nicolay, and Mike Shinoda; cartoonist Mitch Clem; and professional wrestler CM Punk. Herndon Graddick, President of GLAAD, hoped that Grace's public profile would increase public awareness and acceptance of trans people: "[Laura] is displaying extraordinary courage by coming out as transgender after already establishing herself as a rock star. For many of the band's fans, this may be the first time they're actually thinking about transgender people and the bravery it sometimes takes in order to be true to yourself."

Grace confirmed in January 2019 that she underwent facial feminization surgery in December 2018 as part of her transition.

== Discography ==
=== Studio albums ===
Title	Details	Peak chart positions	
Title	Details	US Sales	US Indie
Bought to Rot (as Laura Jane Grace and the Devouring Mothers)	Released: November 9, 2018; Label: Bloodshot; Format: 12" 33⅓ RPM LP, CD, digital download, streaming	90	16
Stay Alive	Released: October 1, 2020; Label: Polyvinyl; Format: 12" 33⅓ RPM LP, CD, cassette, digital download, streaming	—	—
Hole in My Head	Released: February 16, 2024; Label: Polyvinyl; Format: 12" 45 RPM LP, CD, cassette, digital download, streaming	—	—
Adventure Club (as Laura Jane Grace in the Trauma Tropes)	Released: July 18, 2025; Label: Polyvinyl; Format: 12" 45 RPM LP, CD, cassette, digital download, streaming	—	—

=== Extended plays ===
Title	Details	Peak chart positions
Title	Details	US
Heart Burns	Released: November 9, 2008; Label: Sire; Format: 12" 33⅓ RPM vinyl LP, CD, digital download, streaming	185
At War with the Silverfish	Released: September 22, 2021; Label: Polyvinyl; Format: 10" 45 RPM vinyl EP, digital download, streaming	—
Give an Inch	Released: September 6, 2024; Label: Diabl Back Sound; Format: 12" 45 RPM vinyl EP, CD, digital download, streaming	—

=== Singles ===
==== As lead artist ====
Title	Year	Album
"Anna Is a Stool Pigeon"	2008	Heart Burns
"The Best Ever Death Metal Band in Denton"	2017	I Only Listen to the Mountain Goats
"This Land is Your Land" (as Laura Jane Grace & the Devouring Mothers)	2019	This Caffeine Kills Fascists
"Dysphoria Hoodie"	2023	Hole in My Head
"Hole in My Head"	2023	Hole in My Head
"Cuffing Season"	2023	Hole in My Head

==== As featured artist ====
Title	Year	Album
"Take My Shoulder" (Venus de Mars featuring Laura Jane Grace)	2015	Flesh and Wire
"Walking Backwards" (Amends featuring Laura Jane Grace)	2021	Tales of Love, Loss & Outlaws
"I Like You" (Bloods featuring Laura Jane Grace)	2022	Together, Baby!
"Forever of the Living Dead" (Tim Kasher featuring Laura Jane Grace and Jeff Rosenstock)	2022	Middling Age

=== with Against Me! ===
- Against Me! Is Reinventing Axl Rose (2002)
- Against Me! as the Eternal Cowboy (2003)
- Searching for a Former Clarity (2005)
- New Wave (2007)
- White Crosses (2010)
- Transgender Dysphoria Blues (2014)
- Shape Shift with Me (2016)

== Filmography ==
- 2014: True Trans with Laura Jane Grace (TV Series documentary) on AOL Studios – 10 episodes

== Awards ==
- 2014: The Advocate, 40 under 40
- 2014: OUT, OUT 100
- 2015: Emmy Award, News & Documentary Emmy Award, New Approaches: Arts, Lifestyle, Culture (nominee) for True Trans
- 2017: Alternative Press Music Awards, Icon Award

== Selected works and publications ==
=== Mandatory Happiness column ===
- Grace, Laura Jane (February 19, 2015). "Laura Jane Grace on How to Be a Parent When You're Transitioning Genders". Noisey. Vice Media.
- Grace, Laura Jane (March 6, 2015). "Tattooing Away the Pain by Laura Jane Grace". Noisey. Vice Media.
- Grace, Laura Jane (March 30, 2015). "Laura Jane Grace on the Problem with Pronouns". Noisey. Vice Media.
- Grace, Laura Jane (June 12, 2015). "Laura Jane Grace Talks with Fan About Transphobic Assault in the Punk Community". Noisey. Vice Media.
- Grace, Laura Jane (March 28, 2016). "About That Title: Against Me!'s Laura Jane Grace explains why she decided to title her memoir 'TRANNY.'". Noisey. Vice Media.

=== Book ===
- Grace, Laura Jane; Ozzi, Dan (2016). Tranny: Confessions of Punk Rock's Most Infamous Anarchist Sellout. New York: Hachette Books. ISBN 978-0-316-26438-9. OCLC 962854902.
