= List of female bass guitarists =

This is a list of notable female bass guitarists.

== A ==
Stephanie Ashworth

- Gaye Advert (from the Adverts)
- Kianna Alarid (from Tilly and the Wall)
- Chloe Alper (from Pure Reason Revolution)
- Stephanie Ashworth (from Something for Kate)
- Talena Atfield (formerly of Kittie)
- Melissa Auf der Maur (formerly of Hole and the Smashing Pumpkins)
- Carla Azar (from autolux)

== B ==
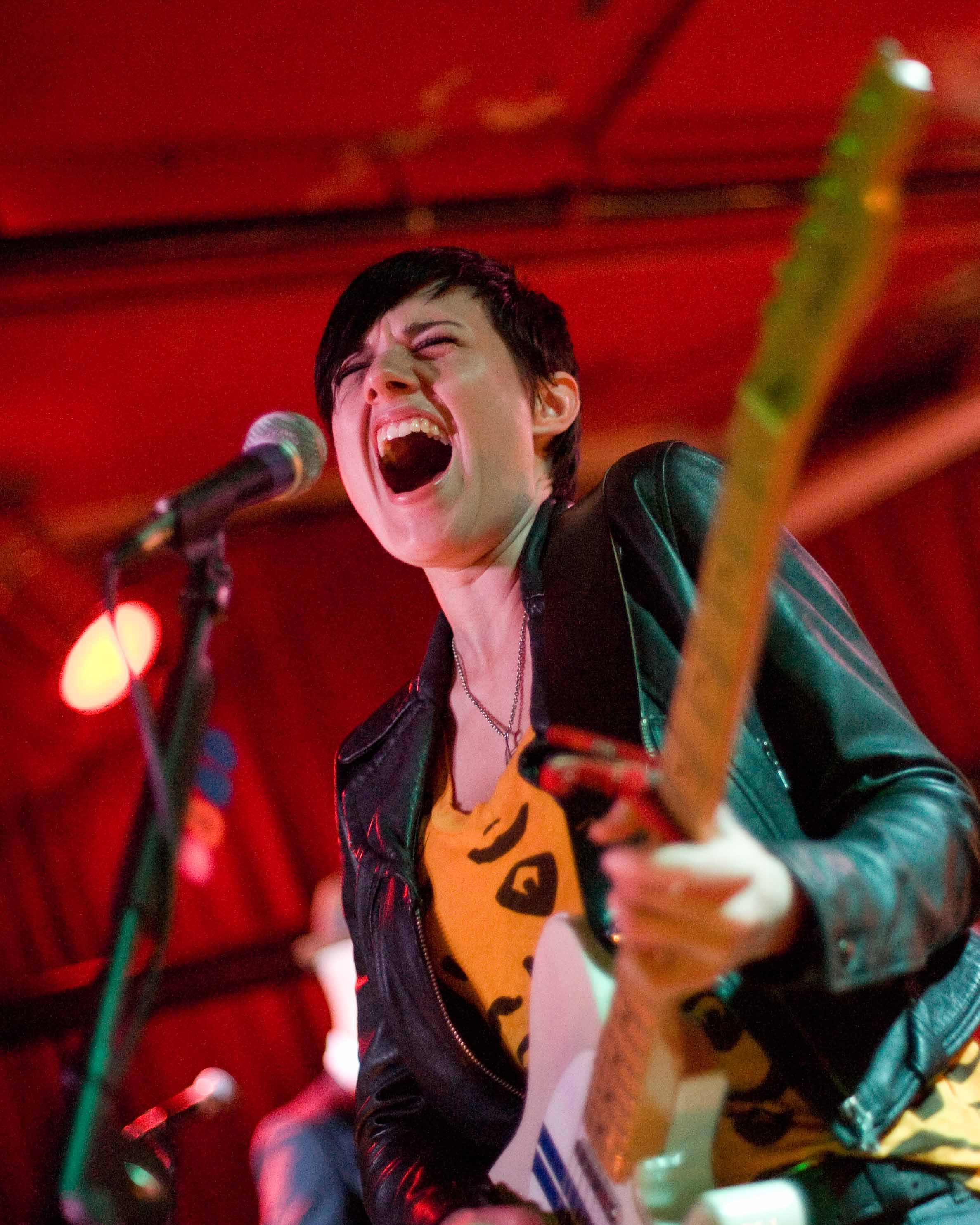
Butterfly Boucher, 2009

- Laura Ballance (from Superchunk)
- Jo Bench (from Bolt Thrower)
- Christina Billotte (formerly of Autoclave)
- Gina Birch (from the Raincoats)
- Lori Black (from Melvins)
- Vicki Blue (formerly of the Runaways)
- Joanna Bolme (from Stephen Malkmus and the Jicks)
- Butterfly Boucher
- Fallon Bowman (formerly of Kittie)
- Shanne Bradley (founding member of the Nips and the Men They Couldn't Hang)
- Beverly Breckenridge (from Fifth Column and Phono-Comb)
- Rosemary Butler (formerly of the Daisy Chain and Birtha)

== C ==
- Yolanda Charles
- Tish Ciravolo (sASSafrASS, Rag Dolls, the Velvets, They Eat Their Own, Shiksa and the Sluts, Lypstik). Founder of Daisy Rock Girl Guitars, who supply guitars made for females
- Sheryl Crow played bass on her second album, Sheryl Crow, and frequently plays bass during her live performances

== D ==
- Kimberley Dahme (from Boston)
- Victoria De Angelis (bassist of Italian rock band Måneskin, winner of Sanremo 2021 and Eurovision 2021)
- Kim Deal (formerly of Pixies, also lead singer/guitarist of the Breeders)
- Blu DeTiger
- Mohini Dey
- Jane Dodd (formerly of the Chills, Verlaines and Able Tasmans)
- Gail Ann Dorsey (session bassist for David Bowie and many other musicians, and toured with Lenny Kravitz)
- Donna Dresch (bassist and guitarist from Team Dresch)
- Stefanie Drootin (bass for the Good Life, also lead singer/guitarist for Consafos)

== E ==
- Islam Elbeiti

== F ==
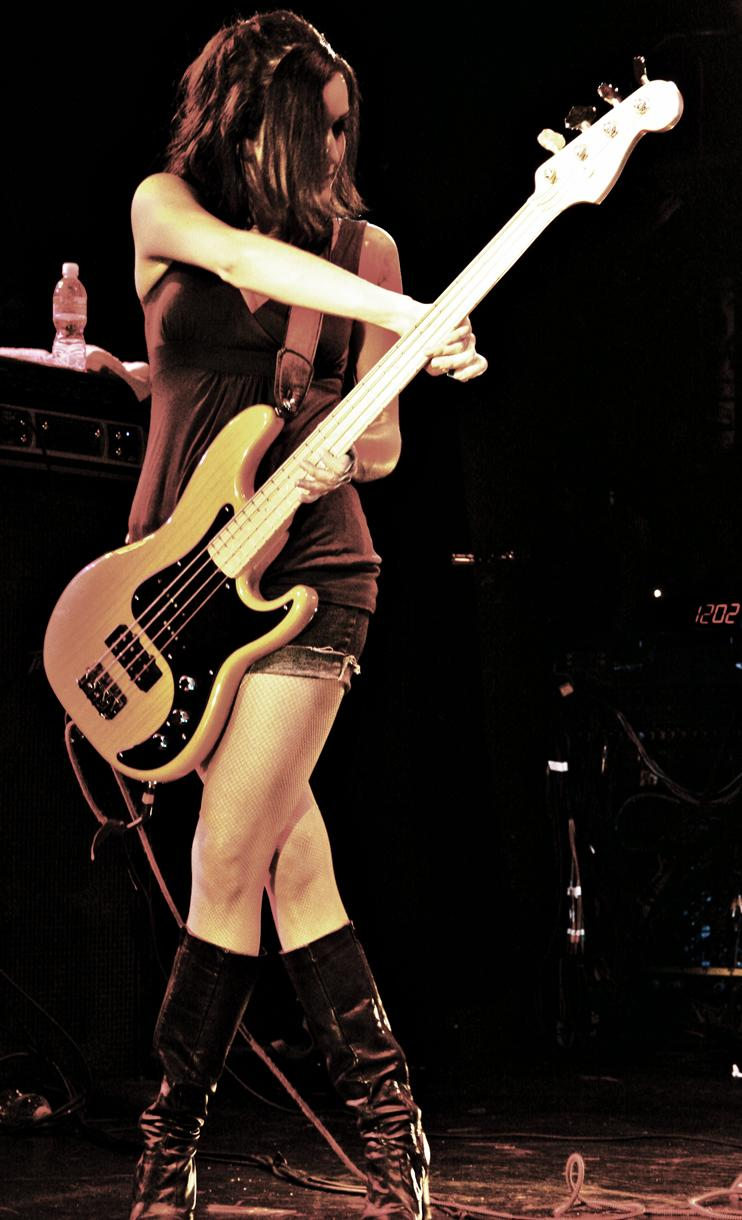
Nicole Fiorentino, 2007

- Alla Fedynitch
- Jennifer Finch (from L7)
- Nicole Fiorentino (from the Smashing Pumpkins, Veruca Salt, Spinnerette)
- Theresa Flaminio
- Sharin Foo (from the Raveonettes)
- Maya Ford a.k.a. "Donna F" (from the Donnas)
- Kathy Foster (from the Thermals)
- Jackie Fox (from the Runaways)
- Misia Furtak (from Très.b)
- Miki Furukawa (from Supercar)

== G ==
- Manou Gallo (Côte d'Ivoire, formerly of Zap Mama)
- Eva Gardner (formerly of the Mars Volta, now with Lyra and toured with Pink)
- Inara George (from the Bird and the Bee)
- Debbie Googe (from My Bloody Valentine)
- Kim Gordon (from Sonic Youth)
- Ellie Goulding
- Gail Greenwood (from Belly and formerly of L7)
- Camila Grey (Uh Huh Her)

== H ==
- Rachel Haden (from the Rentals; formerly of That Dog)
- Janine Hall (formerly of the Saints; later Weddings Parties Anything and Young Charlatans)
- Bianca "Butthole" Halstead (from Betty Blowtorch; formerly of Butt Trumpet)
- Leslie Hardy (formerly of Hole)
- Juliana Hatfield (formerly of Blake Babies, played bass on the Lemonheads' It's a Shame about Ray; currently singer/guitarist)
- Maureen Herman (from Babes in Toyland)
- Annie Holland (formerly of Elastica)

== I ==
- Joyce Irby (from Klymaxx)

== J ==
- Joan Jett (from Joan Jett & the Blackhearts; normally plays rhythm guitar, but played bass for the Runaways in 1977)

== K ==
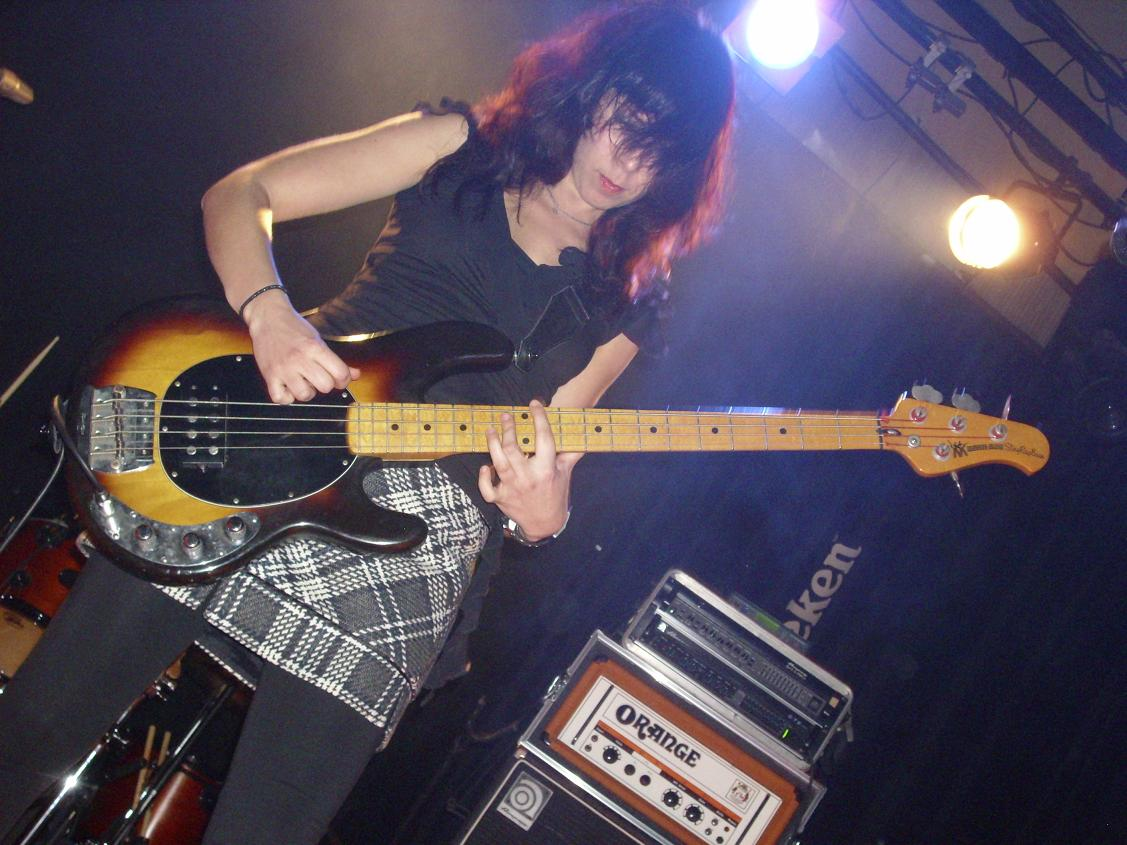
Marjolein Kooijman, 2010

- Carol Kaye (one of the most recorded bass players in history)
- Charlotte Kemp Muhl (from the Ghost of a Saber Tooth Tiger)
- Kerri Kenney-Silver (formerly of Cake Like)
- Debra Killings
- Holly Knight (formerly of Device; handled the bass parts on the band's lone album 22B3)

== L ==
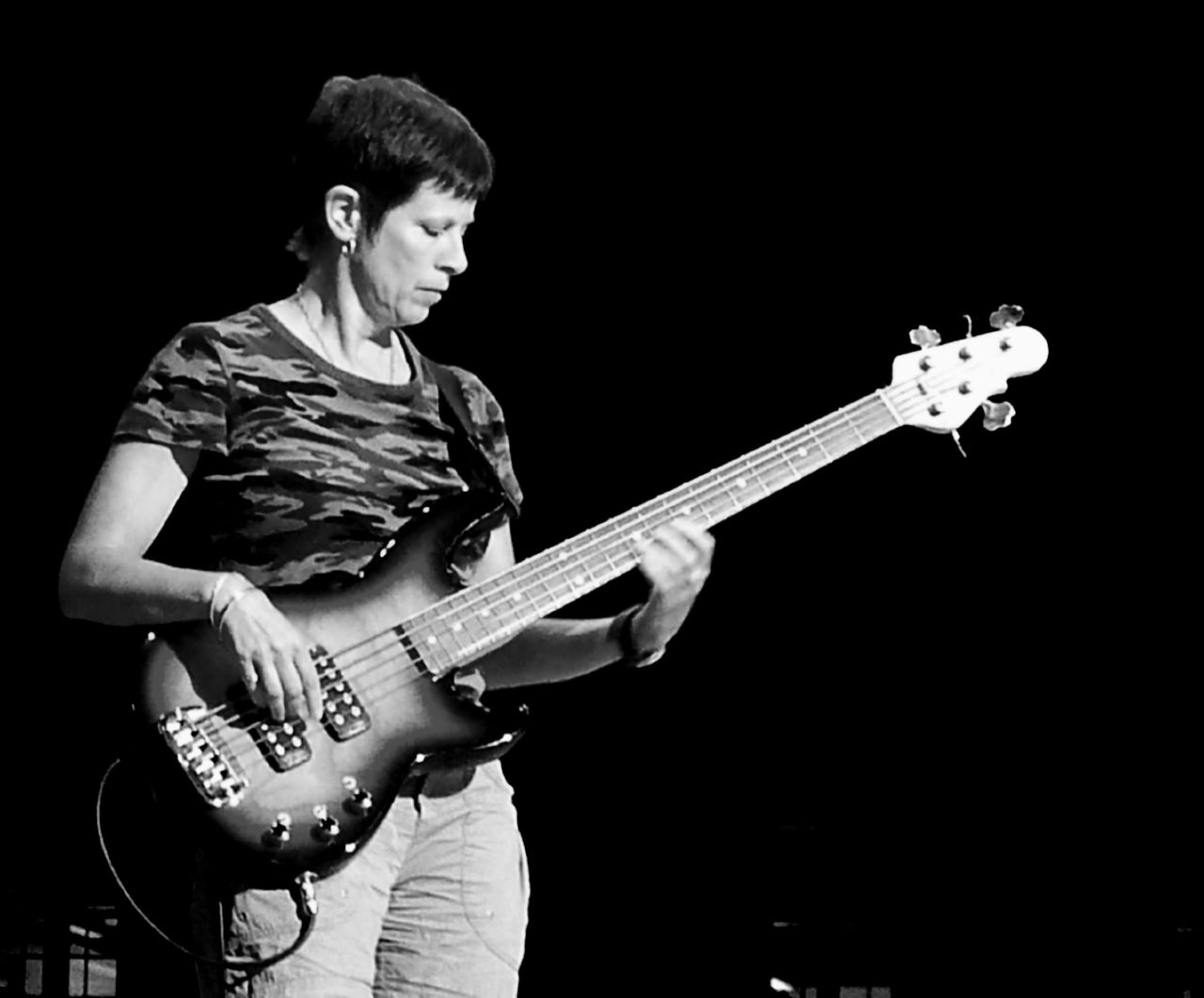
Sara Lee, 2007

- Mai Leisz
- Laura Lee (from Khruangbin)
- Sara Lee (from Gang of Four, the B-52's, Robert Fripp's League of Gentlemen) and Indigo Girls
- Paz Lenchantin (formerly of Pixies, the Entrance Band, A Perfect Circle and Zwan; she has also contributed to songs for Queens of the Stone Age)
- Jenny Lewis (from Rilo Kiley)
- Jenny Lee Lindberg (from Warpaint)

== M ==
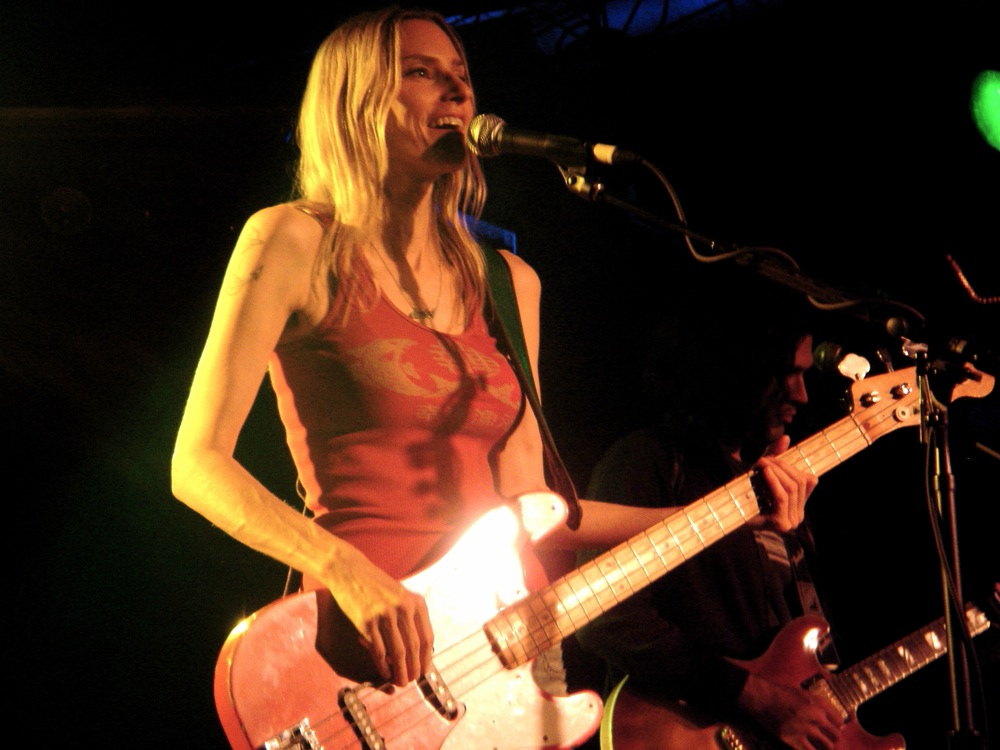
Aimee Mann, 2005

- Michelle Mae (from Weird War and formerly of the Make-Up)
- Leslie Mah (from Tribe 8 and formerly of Anti-Scrunti Faction)
- Natalie Maines (from the Dixie Chicks; periodically plays bass during their live shows)
- Aimee Mann (founding member of 'Til Tuesday)
- Zia McCabe (from the Dandy Warhols)
- Molly McGuire
- Mitski
- Patricia Morrison (the Sisters of Mercy, the Gun Club, the Damned)
- Robin Moulder (from TCR and Jack Off Jill)

== N ==
- Michie Nakatani (formerly of Shonen Knife)
- Johnette Napolitano (from Concrete Blonde)
- Kate Nash
- Meshell Ndegeocello (Grammy-winning bassist and singer)
- Danielle Nicole (Trampled Under Foot)
- Ida Nielsen (of Zap Mama, Michael Learns to Rock, 3rdeyegirl and the New Power Generation)
- Kim Nielsen (from Phantom Blue)

== O ==
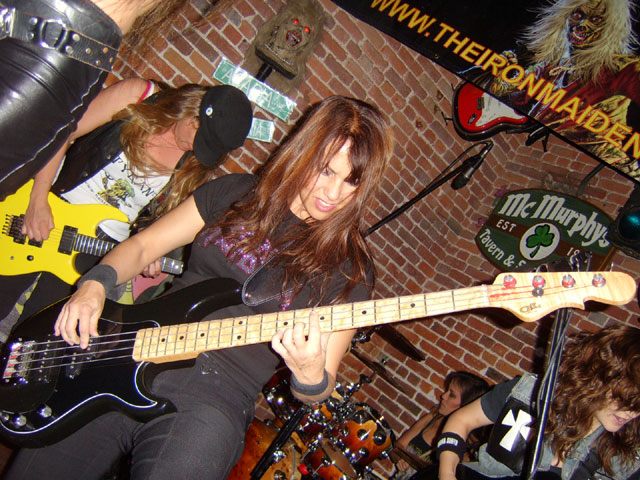
Wanda Ortiz, 2008

- Tomomi Ogawa (from Scandal)
- Cait O'Riordan (the Pogues)
- Wanda Ortiz (from the Iron Maidens)
- Yuko Oshima (from AKB48)
- Catherine Owen

== P ==
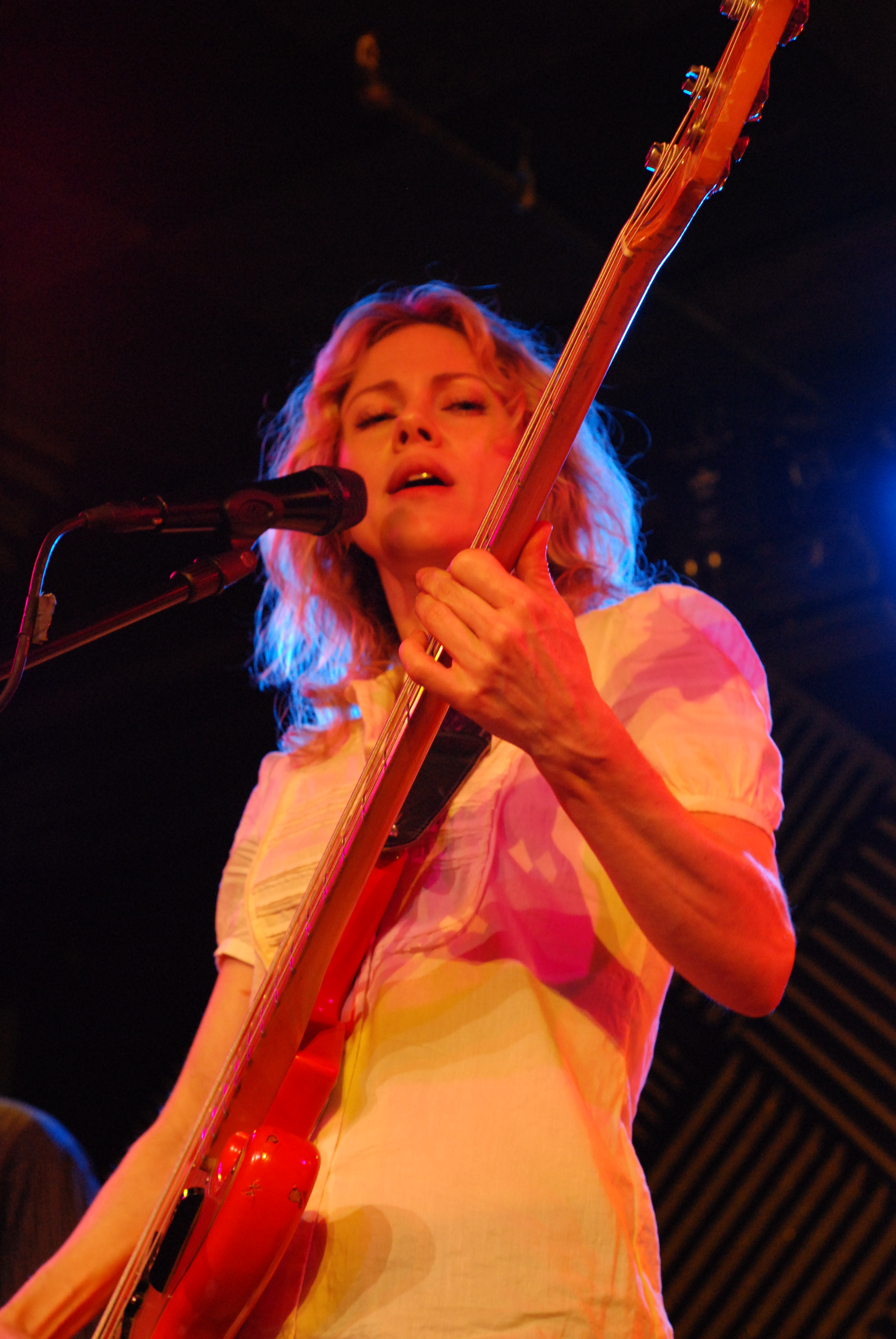
Britta Phillips, 2007

- Lucy Patané
- Kristen Pfaff (formerly of Hole and Janitor Joe)
- Britta Phillips (from Luna and Dean and Britta)
- Tessa Pollitt (from the Slits)
- Ginger Pooley (formerly of the Smashing Pumpkins, Halo Friendlies)
- Catherine Popper (formerly of Ryan Adams & the Cardinals and Grace Potter and the Nocturnals)

== Q ==
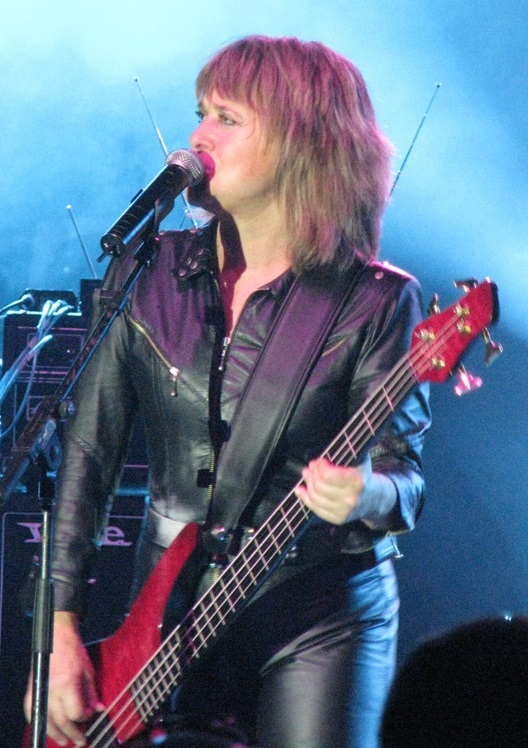
Suzi Quatro, 2007

- Suzi Quatro (leads an unnamed backing band; formerly of Cradle, the Pleasure Seekers, and the Art Quatro Trio)

== R ==
- Leah Randi
- Julianne Regan (formerly of Gene Loves Jezebel)
- Regina Zernay Roberts (from Scarlet Fever, formerly of Cowboy Mouth and Méchant)
- Kira Roessler (from Dos and formerly of Black Flag)
- Share Ross (from Vixen, formerly of Contraband, Havana 3 A.M. and the Dogs D'Amour)
- Nicole Row (from Incubus and formerly of Panic! at the Disco)
- Divinity Roxx (toured with Beyoncé, Victor Wooten, 2NE1)

== S ==
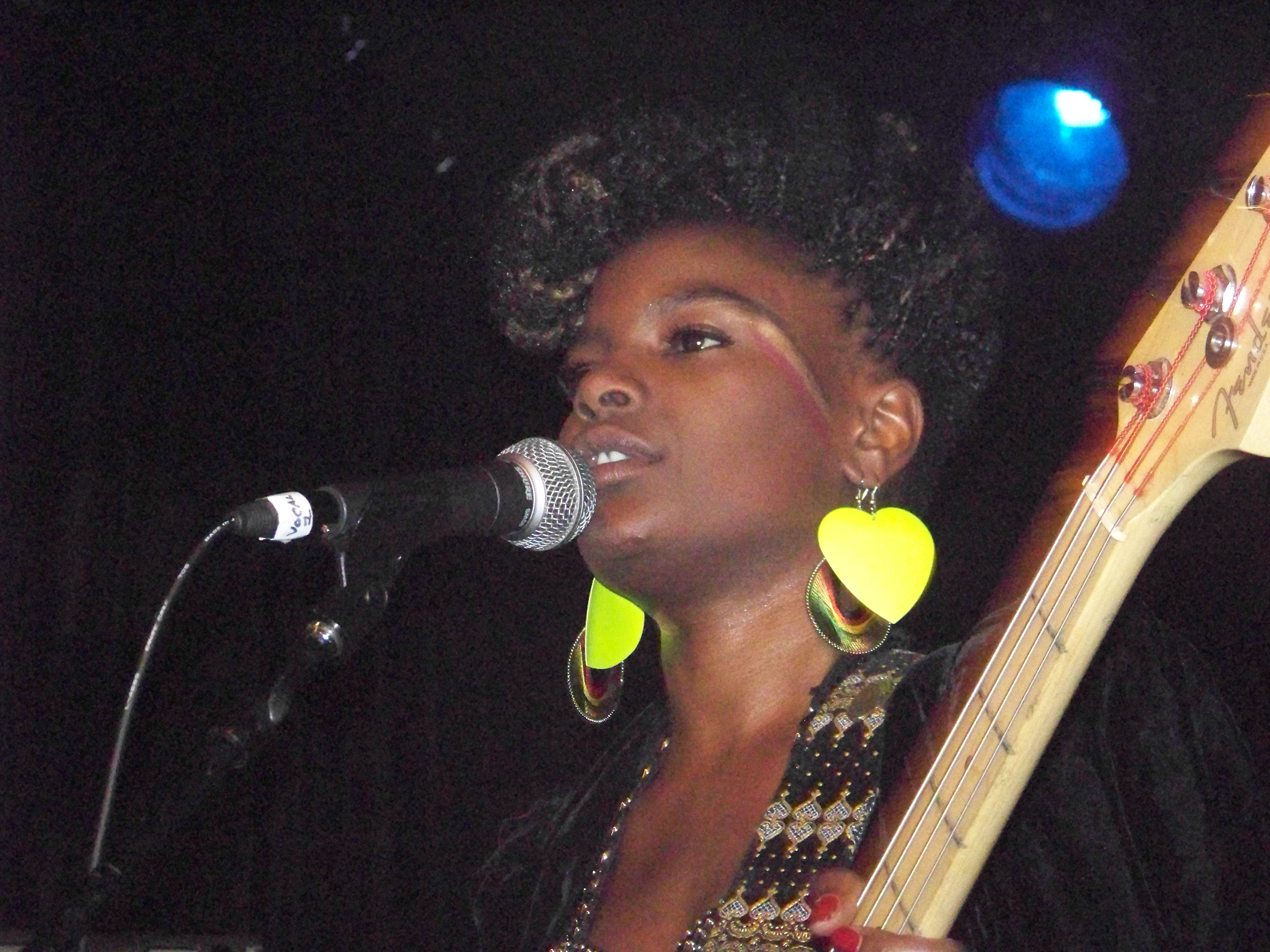
Shingai Shoniwa, 2007

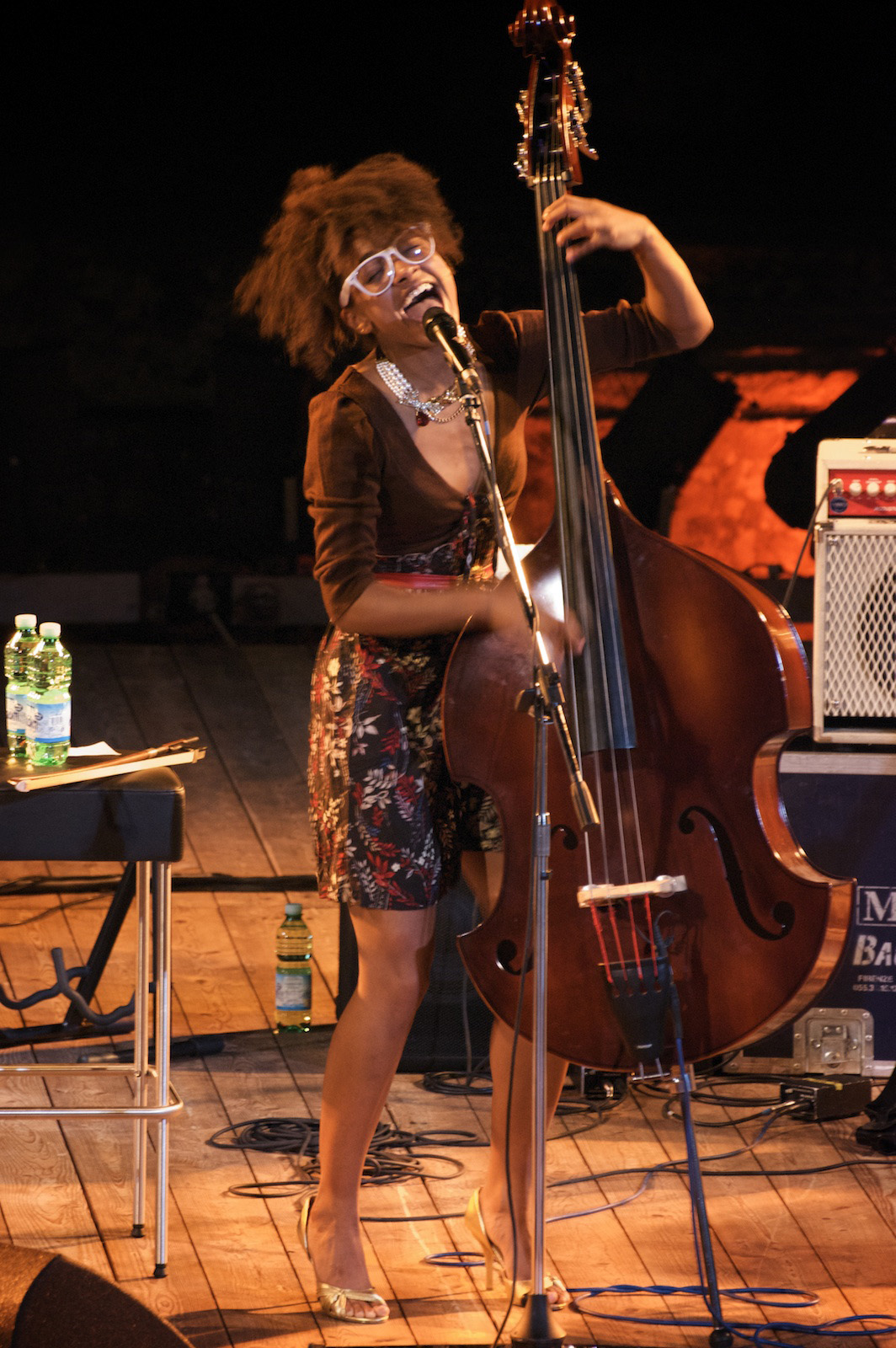
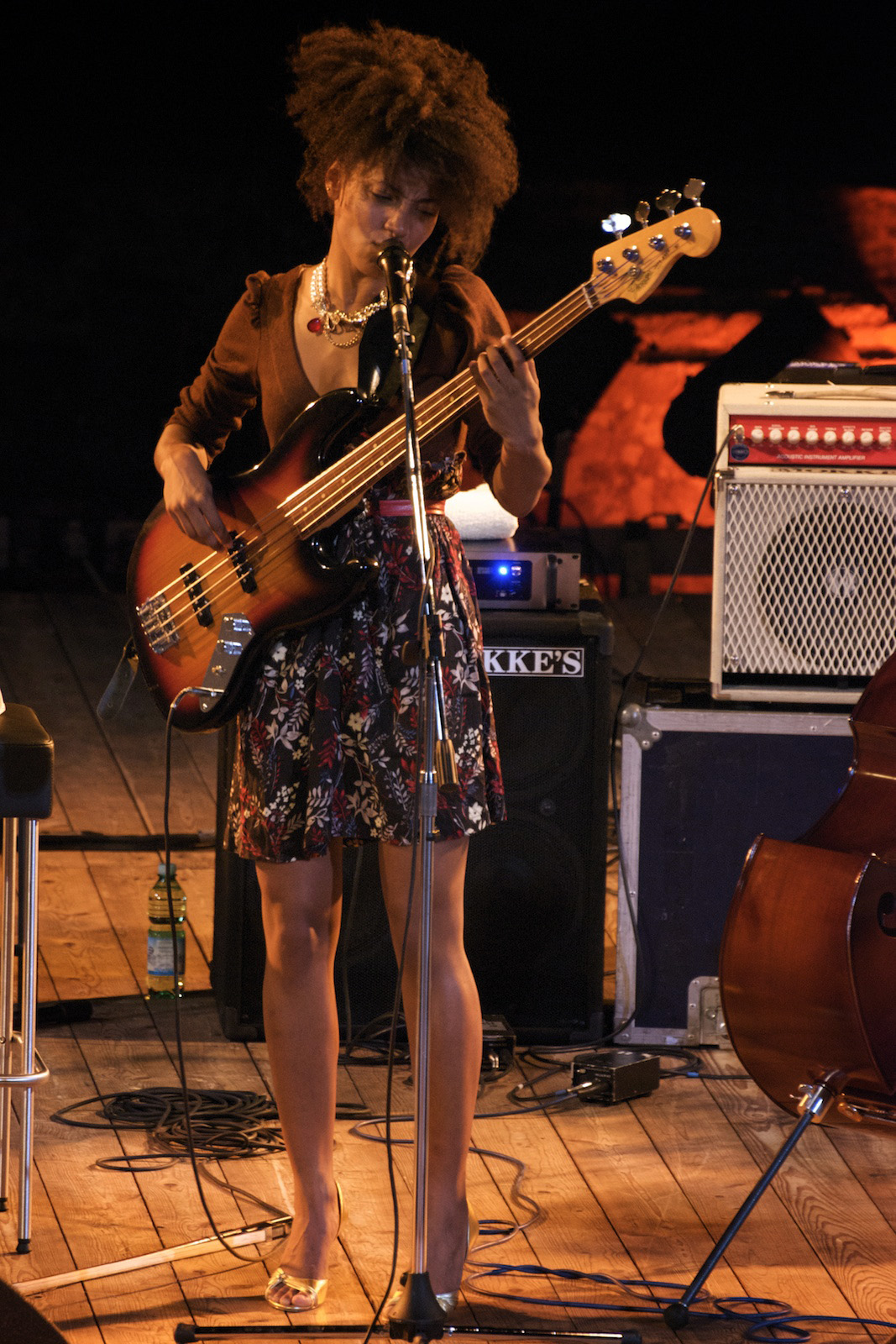
Esperanza Spalding alternates between double bass and bass guitar in her performances.
- Jeanne Sagan (from the Acacia Strain, All That Remains)
- Anna Sentina
- Kim Shattuck (formerly of the Pandoras, later singer/guitarist for the Muffs; filled in as touring bassist for Pixies)
- Shingai Shoniwa (from Noisettes)
- Melanie Sisneros (from Crescent Shield, Whole Lotta Rosies, Hangar 18, Mz Led formerly of the Iron Maidens, Sinergy, New Eden)
- Grace Slick (formerly of Jefferson Starship, Starship, Jefferson Airplane, the Great Society; primarily a singer, but sometimes played bass for the Great Society)
- Debbie Smith (from Echobelly)
- Rhonda Smith
- Esperanza Spalding
- Donita Sparks (from Donita Sparks and the Stellar Moments and L7)
- Malka Spigel (from Githead and Minimal Compact)
- Micki Steele (from the Bangles, formerly of the Runaways)
- Eliot Sumner
- Sunmi (primarily a singer but previously played for the Wonder Girls)

== T ==
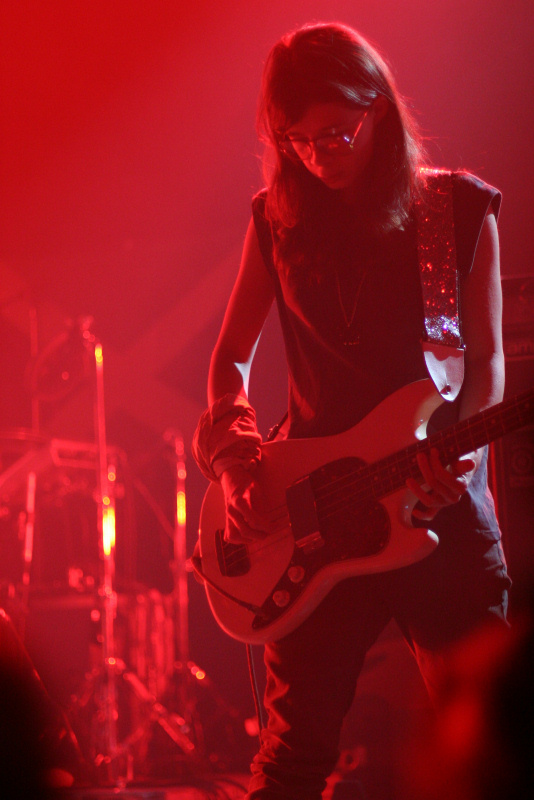
Iracema Trevisan, 2007

- Ritsuko Taneda (from Shonen Knife)
- Rachel Trachtenburg (from Trachtenburg Family Slideshow Players)
- Abby Travis
- Iracema Trevisan (from Cansei de Ser Sexy)
- Shonna Tucker (Previously of Drive-by Tuckers)

== V ==
- Kathy Valentine (from the Go-Go's, also lead singer/guitarist for the BlueBonnets and the Delphines)
- Ivana "Ivy" Vujic (formerly with Kittie)

== W ==
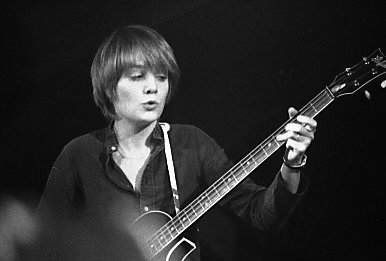
Tina Weymouth, 1978

- Kim Warnick (co-founder of Fastbacks; formerly of Visqueen)
- Milkie Way (bass and vocals for Wargasm)
- Tina Weymouth (founding member of Talking Heads and Tom Tom Club)
- Josephine Wiggs (from the Breeders)
- Kathi Wilcox (from Bikini Kill)
- Tal Wilkenfeld (formerly toured with Jeff Beck, solo)
- Anka Wolbert (formerly of Clan of Xymox a/k/a Xymox)
- Tracy Wormworth (the Waitresses, the B-52's, Sting)
- D'arcy Wretzky (formerly of the Smashing Pumpkins)

== Y ==
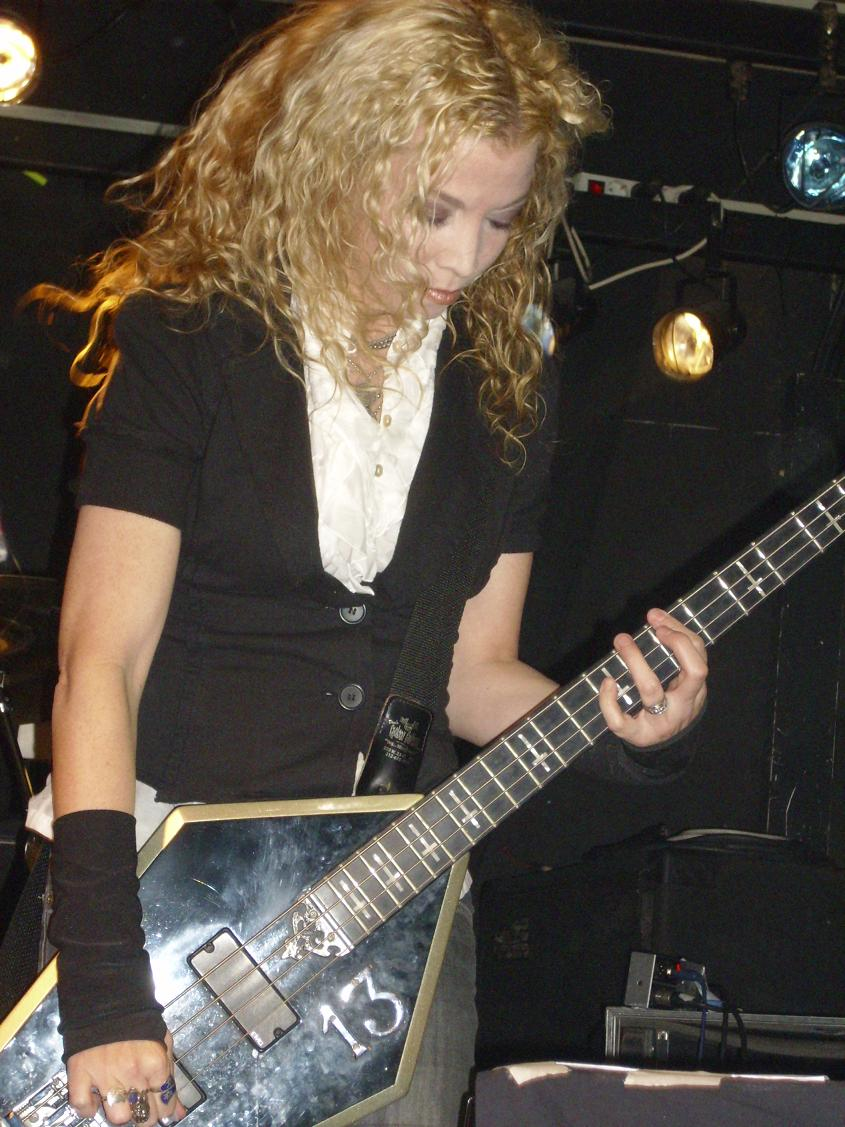
Sean Yseult, 2010

- Atsuko Yamano (from Shonen Knife)
- Naomi Yang (from Galaxie 500, Magic Hour, and Damon & Naomi)
- Toko Yasuda (from Enon)
- Jennifer York (formerly of Rachel Rachel)
- Sean Yseult (formerly of White Zombie)
