= Christy Darlington =

American singer-songwriter (born 1972)

Christy Brigitte Darlington
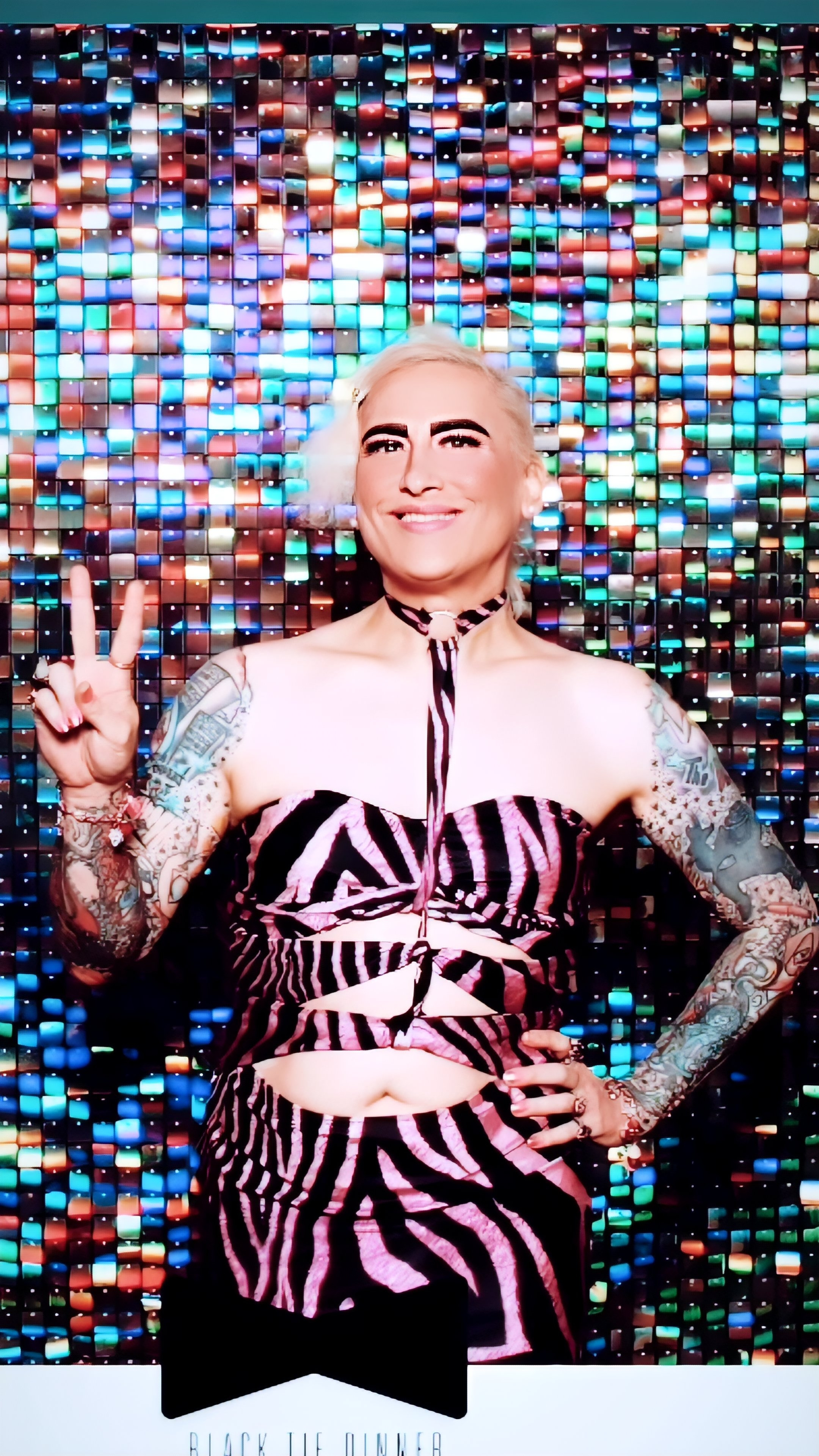
- Darlington flashing peace sign at a live event.(2023)

Background information
- Born: December 1, 1972 (age 53); Dallas Texas
- Genres: Punk, pop punk, rock
- Instruments: Vocals, guitar, bass
- Years active: 1991–present
- Label: Broadway Recording Company

Christy Brigitte Darlington, commonly known by her stage name of Darlington, is an American singer-songwriter, guitarist, published author and visual artist. She has performed multiple American and European concert tours, and has had music played on hundreds of radio stations across North America and Europe, as well as featured in television shows on MTV.

Darlington was endorsed by Daisy Rock Guitars in 2003.

In 2021, Christy Brigitte Darlington came out publicly as being a transgender woman, and as of 2023 she lives publicly as a transgender woman.

== Early life ==
Christy Brigitte Darlington was born Chris Edward Zoys, on December 1, 1972, in Dallas, Texas. She attended private Christian schools such as Heritage Christian Academy, Trinity Christian Academy, and Episcopal School of Dallas,

Darlington eventually graduated from Thomas Jefferson High School in 1991.

== Musical career ==
From 1991 to 1993 Darlington was singing and writing songs for a punk rock band called "T.B.A.," which performed a few shows and made a live recording and two studio recordings. In 1994 she joined a punk rock band called the Voyeurs (which opened up for the Offspring), but Darlington quit the band six months later.

=== Mess ===
In 1995, Christy Darlington formed a punk rock band called "Mess" with drummer Steven Visneau and bassist Ron Malippa. Christy was responsible for writing and arranging almost all the songs for the band as well as maintaining a role as the lead singer and guitarist. The band's first single "Sugar Fix" was featured on a compilation released by Clear Channel Communications Rock FM radio station KDGE entitled Tales from the Edge Volume 11., followed by another single, "Butt-in-ski", on the Dallas Observer compilation CD Scene, Heard Vol. 2. The band featured four-second guitarists, most notably Phil Karnats of Tripping Daisy fame and Dylan Silvers who went on to other bands, including the Polyphonic Spree. On Mess releases, Darlington was listed as "Cris Mess", a stage name. She did not use that as a legal name at the time and was still using her original birth name.

The band achieved local notoriety resulting in being featured with the Mullens on a split vinyl EP released by Direct Hit Records and the band subsequently signed to Dallas indie label Last Beat Records and released their first and only full-length album Pretty Ugly in 1997 as well as a vinyl EP with Los Angeles band 22 Jacks. Two songs on the album were named after Jim beam and Goldschlager. Mess also recorded a cover version of the Mötley Crüe song "Red Hot" for a compilation, and the song "Brain Dead" was featured on pro skateboarder Duane Peters' Disaster Records compilation Old Skars and upstarts. Many of the "mess-era" recordings would later be reissued under the Darlington name. In late 1997, the band was notified a Chicago-area band called the Mess had the name copyrighted and was threatening legal action if the name was not changed. Starting in late 1996 thru late 1997, Mess played its first out of town concert opening for the band Fastball and performed multiple U.S. tours between January and September 1997, including opening slots for major label bands NY Loose, the Reverend Horton Heat, Keanu Reeves' group Dogstar, Radish, Funland, Hagfish, Tripping Daisy, Fluffy, 22 Jacks, the Queers, Swingin Utters, Agent Orange, At the Drive-in, Showcase Showdown, Furious George and the U.S. Bombs. Mess also performed at the Texas State Mental Hospital in Terrell, Texas to a crowd of around 100 patients, eclipsing the Cramps who had previously been the only rock and roll band known to have performed in a mental hospital. although no video was allowed, a photo of the band sitting on the entrance sign was featured on a split vinyl EP they shared with 22 Jacks. The band also recorded a live concert at the famed CBGB rock venue in New York City, although this would only be released later under the Darlington name.

=== Darlington ===
Darlington has released 19 full length vinyl, CD, and digital albums, 8 vinyl and digital EPs, contributed to approximately 22 compilations, and roughly 5 split EPs, with several other acts since 1998. All of the releases were on independent record labels in the U.S., Germany, The Netherlands, Italy, and Russia, including Louder than Morrissey and Moron-a-thon on Dutch indie label Stardumb Records, All the wrong moves on New York label Whoa Oh Records, a single release of "X-Mas" on an Idol Records Christmas compilation, the Bowling Betty vinyl EP and Live Dallas 1999 album on Mutant Pop Records and 2 tracks on Go-Kart Records MP300 Raceway CD. Darlington's 1998 full-length album Girltroversy released by Last Beat Records was the first under the Darlington name and considered by most critics, press and fans to be her most influential album.

In 2000, Darlington was included on Split, a split CD release on New York record label Melted Records with the Huntingtons, after which Darlington's most extensive U.S. tour followed the release featuring Darlington opening up for the Huntingtons. In 2004, professional skateboarder Duane Peters signed Darlington to his record label Disaster Records and designed the sleeve art for the only album Darlington recorded for Disaster, entitled Euthanize me. In 2007, Darlington Recorded a live album entitled Live Dallas 2007 which was produced and mixed by Todd and Toby Pipes of the band Deep Blue Something and limited to 1000 hand-numbered CD copies. In 2008, Darlington released a limited-to-1000 hand-numbered CD copies mini-anthology entitled indoor-outdoor Luxury BBQ, of which the title was inspired by an episode of the British television program Keeping Up Appearances.

Aside from a few compilations and limited vinyl releases, Darlington's only full-length recordings between 2009 and 2011 were all available digitally only.

In 1998, she performed a second concert at the Texas State Mental hospital in Terrell, Texas. This time the show was attended by 100+ patients and documented in the Dallas Observer by a local reporter. Darlington also performed on a benefit concert for Booker T. Washington High School for the Performing and Visual Arts. From 1998 to 2011 Darlington opened for Lagwagon, Bowling for soup, DGeneration, Centro-matic, the Click Five, the Apers, Teen Idols, the Lillingtons, the Huntingtons, Bratmobile, the Queers, the Unlovables, Good Riddance, the Eyeliners, SR-71 (band), the Prozacs, Red Lightning and appeared on the Vans Warped tour twice.

During the 1998 U.S. Tours, Christy was asked by Joe Queer of the Queers to collaborate on a recording with Green Day but for reasons unknown it never happened.

In 2012, Hollywood-based independent record label, Broadway Recording Company, signed Darlington to a contract. Darlington repackaged previously released solo material under the band name Sunglasses&Sugar, and released it on an album entitled Vuvuzuelas. After putting together a lineup and performing live, "Sunglasses&Sugar" recorded a three-song Maxi-Single entitled "Tinsel Tree" that was produced and mixed by Salim Nourallah. These songs were rerecorded versions of Darlington songs. After eight live shows, which included opening up for singer Lezlie Deane's band Scary cherry and the bang bangs, the Dollyrots, and Jaret Reddick's band People on Vacation, Darlington disbanded the project to work with Broadway Recording Company on compiling out-of-print releases for reissue and writing new material.

Darlington's radio show, "The Moron-a-thon" became syndicated weekly on Deep Ellum Radio in February 2014, lasting for 46 episodes until August 2014.

In 2015, Darlington resumed touring across the U.S. performing without a full band live, completely solo playing only an electric guitar. She also released new limited-run cassette and vinyl releases on California-based Jerkoff Records and Wiener Records (a subsidiary of Burger Records). Broadway Recording Company also revamped Darlington's digital releases to coincide with new recordings and touring. Darlington's Moron-a-thon radio show episodes were moved to the Podbean website where more episodes were posted, includes ones with guest co-host such as Erik Chandler of Bowling for soup and Mike Graff of Course of Empire. Darlington also performed live on bass guitar for a few shows with Austin band the Sweethearts. From 2015 to the present, Darlington has been performing regularly all over the U.S. completely solo with no band and only an electric guitar as accompaniment.

== Songwriting ==
Although she has written and recorded a wide variety of songs, Christy Darlington is most well known for writing songs about, inspired by, or poking fun at famous people. This includes supermodels Karen Elson and Gisele Bündchen, and Olympic athletes Lolo Jones and Picabo Street,

In turn, the band Johnie 3 recorded a sarcastic ode to Darlington entitled Christy Brigitte Darlington. There is a brick in the courtyard of the Latino cultural center in Dallas with Christy Brigitte Darlington inscribed on it that Darlington paid for with a donation.

She has also gained attention for personalizing song lyrics by using real life places and products such as Disneyland, Vogue Magazine, and the Toyota Corolla, as well as a song entitled "NASA" in which the lyrics claim Darlington participated in a medical research study for NASA.

Some of Darlington's offensive songs have drawn criticism for their sexually explicit lyrical nature including "ATM" and "Boobs, Boobs, Boobs", while others such as "Ashley's a prostitute" feature lyrics that portray Darlington as friends with a real-life prostitute. Publicity and advertising for the Sex album was also criticized for the promotional website and Orthotricyclen inspired CD packaging. Darlington's is known for obnoxious banter with the audience as evidenced on the three live albums he has recorded. Generally, Christy Darlington has been known for songs with obnoxious, sarcastic and often sexually suggestive or explicit lyrics, some with a left-leaning political bent.

Darlington has been known for re-arranging cover songs in a rock/punk format and performing them live.

== Other work ==
While most famous for her extensive musical career but has worked in other fields between touring and recording. In the 90's she was an intern for Harpers Bazaar fashion magazine in New York, and worked for several fashion retail companies including Old Navy, Gap, Contempo Casuals, Claire's, Urban Outfitters, Abercrombie & Fitch, Pacific Sunwear, Steve Madden and Hot Topic.

In 2009, Darlington maintained a blog she titled Sunglasses&Sugar in which she conducted interviews with many famous and semi-famous people from various walks of life which included Mark Pirro of Tripping Daisy and the Polyphonic Spree, Cliffy Huntington of the Huntingtons, Joe Queer of the Queers, Zach Blair of Rise Against and Hagfish band, Phanie Diaz of Girl in a coma, Tish Ciravolo of Daisy Rock Guitars, Boz Boorer of Morrissey's band, singer Alice Bag, Brendan B. Brown of Wheatus, singer Brijitte West of the band NY Loose, Darley Newman, host of Equitrekking, and Julie Schablitsky of Time Team America. In late 2009, the blog was discontinued and deleted, but the interviews were all archived online by Times Beach magazine.

In 2012, she became a published author with her first novel, entitled "Babycakes". The 600 plus page fictional account of a female protagonist named "Babycakes" was published through Amazon on paperback and as an e-book.

Darlington has also produced paintings and art pieces as well as created concert poster art for herself as well as Sunglasses&Sugar.

== Controversy ==
Christy publicly disputed sales and royalty figures with several record labels, as well as publicly took issue with publications she felt cast her in an unfavorable light.

There are many stories of Darlington doing outrageous, controversial, or wacky things, likely as publicity stunts. These include sending a bouquet of roses with a CD and concert invite to supermodel Amber valletta during an appearance at Neiman Marcus, Darlington appearing onstage in drag, and regular appearances on KTCK radio station on a former night time talk radio show called the Wild Ass Circus.

=== Sex offense ===
After a three-year legal battle over a charge of sexual assault stemming from a 2006 encounter with a 16-year-old girl, Darlington accepted a plea bargain in 2009 for five years deferred adjudication probation as well as mandatory counseling. She was also required to register as a sex offender. Texas state law prohibited Darlington from presenting mitigating evidence that the female had misrepresented her age to her in court as a defense. Darlington appealed the case on that basis, but the appeal was denied. Darlington completed probation and counseling in November 2014. In 2016 the state of Texas approved application for Darlington to be removed from the sex offender registry, but the judge would not sign off on the removal unless the Dallas district attorney's office also signed off on the removal. The DA office refused.

== Discography ==
- 2 song split 7-inch EP with the Mullens on Direct Hit Records (as Mess) (Dallas) (1995)
- "Sugar Fix" single on Tales from the edge vol 11 The Edge KDGE FM radio station compilation CD (as Mess) (1995)
- "Butt-in-ski" single on Dallas Observer scene heard vol 2 compilation CD (as Mess) (1995)
- "Playmate" single release on Texas Style compilation CD (1995)
- Pretty Ugly full-length CD on Last Beat Records (as Mess) (Dallas) (1997)
- 2 song split 7-inch vinyl EP with 22 Jacks on Last Beat Records (as Mess) (Dallas) (1997)
- "Red Hot" Mötley Crüe cover song on Come on feel the metal compilation CD (Mess) (1997)
- "Brain Dead" single on old skars and upstarts compilation CD release on Disaster Records (Los Angeles) (as Mess) (1997)
- Girltroversy full-length CD on Last Beat Records (Darlington) (Dallas) (1998)
- "Time Warp" on Absolute pleasure, a tribute album to The Rocky Horror Picture Show (1998)
- "Infection" single on Old skars and upstarts vol. 3 compilation CD release on Disaster Records (Los Angeles) (1998)
- "Judy Jetson" single release on Dos Sensenseos compilation CD (Clandestine Project) (1998)
- Mess You up full-length CD on Melted Records (New York) (1999)
- "Six" single release on My so-called punk rock life compilation CD on Melted Records (1999)
- "Superspazz" single release on Garage nights Lazertrax compilation CD (1999)
- Texas punk rock sweethearts 4 song 7-inch vinyl EP on She's Gone Records (Denton) (2000)
- Split (2000) full-length CD and 12-inch vinyl release with the Huntingtons, the CD distributed through Melted Records (New York) and the vinyl distributed through Stardumb Records (Netherlands)
- Bowling Betty 3 song 7-inch vinyl EP on Mutant Pop Records (Oregon) (2000)
- Live Dallas 1999 full-length CD on Mutant Pop Records (Oregon) (2000)
- "X-mas" single release on Electric ornaments Idol Records Christmas compilation CD (2000)
- "Mustang ranch" single release on Transylvania style punk rock compilation on Worn out Records (2000)
- "NASA" single release on United punks vol. 1 compilation R.U.T. Records (2000)
- "Superspazz" single release on Lollipop magazine issue No. 61 MP3 comp CD (2000)
- Louder than Morrissey 12-inch vinyl/CD full-length album on Stardumb Records (Netherlands) (2001)
- "Picabo Street/Chrysanthemum" 2 song 7-inch vinyl 45 single on X Records (Los Angeles) (2001)
- "Swing Shift" single release on R.A.F.R. Vol. 3 compilation CD (2001)
- Lust-n-Love 4 song 7-inch vinyl Ep on Three Kings Records (Germany) (feat. the songs "infection", "sniff you out', "Love", and "Shiloh") (2002)
- Louder than Morrissey full-length CD release on End Records (Austin TX) (2002)
- 2 song 7-inch vinyl EP with the High School Dropouts on Daytime Dilemma Records (Italy) (2002)
- All the wrong moves full-length CD album on Whoa Oh Records (New York) (2003)
- "Lucky Girl" single on AMP pop punk compilation CD (2003)
- 2 songs on MP300 Raceway compilation CD by Go-Kart Records (New York) (2003)
- "El Choppo" 2 song 7-inch vinyl Ep with Johnie 3 on Wide Stance Records (Ohio) (2003)
- Moron-a-thon full-length CD album on Stardumb Records (Netherlands) (2003)
- Live at CBGB full length download only album on Endsounds (Austin) (2003)
- "Dorkin’ Around" single release on compilation Punk vs Emo on Fastmusic (2003)
- "Perfect" single release on Yuppiefest Compilation CD (2003)
- Euthanize Me full-length CD album on Disaster Records (Los Angeles) (2004)
- "Shut up and skate" on Assassination City Roller Derby Watch your head Vol 2 compilation CD (2004)
- "Shut up and skate" single release on Lollipop magazine issue No. 67 mp3 compilation (2004)
- "Skate or split" single on Punk rock high school int. CD compilation on FM Molchit records (Moscow, Russia) (2004)
- "X-mas" single release on Countdown to Christmas compilation CD/12-inch vinyl on Three Kings Records (Germany) (2004)
- "Ocelots" single release on A peek from the unknown compilation on Oldhouse Records (2005)
- "No Dress Code" single release on Punk Rock Mix Tape compilation on Fastmusic (2006)
- Sex full-length CD album release on Fastmusic (Connecticut) (2006)
- Live Dallas 2007 full-length CD album release (indie, Dallas) (2007)
- "January" single release on Barfights and brokenhearts compilation (punkrockreview.org release) (2007)
- indoor-outdoor luxury BBQ mini-anthology CD release (indie, Dallas) (2008)
- "Lucky girl" (Live Dallas 2007 version) single release on Where the fun never sets vol. 2 compilation on Cabana One Records (2008)
- 2 song 7-inch vinyl EP w/ Teenage Bubblegums on Knowhere records (Michigan) & Making Believe Records, Voodoo Doll Records & Tornado Ride Records (all Italy) (2009)
- Rock-n-Roll mini-anthology digital release (indie, Dallas) (2009)
- Pop singles mini-anthology digital release (indie, Dallas) (2009)
- "SUV" ("Sex" version) single release on Open 24 hours compilation on Diner Junkie Records (2009)
- Hot 100 full length digital release (indie, Dallas) (2010)
- "You little charmer" 3-song maxi-single digital release (indie, Dallas) (2010)
- Heartache full length digital release (indie, Dallas) (2011)
- Sunglasses&Sugar full length digital album release (indie, Dallas) (2011)
- "Deep Ellum Horror Story" single release on Wish you were here…love, Deep Ellum compilation (Dallas) (2011)
- Vuvuzuelas full-length CD/Digital release (as Sunglasses&Sugar) on Broadway Recording Co. (Los Angeles) (2012)
- "Tinsel Tree" 3-song maxi-single CD/Digital (as Sunglasses&Sugar) on Broadway Recording Co. (Los Angeles) (2012)
- Classics digital anthology release on Broadway Recording Company (2013)
- Classics 2 digital anthology release on Broadway Recording Company (2013)
- Classics 3 digital anthology release on Broadway Recording Company (2014)
- "Steffi Baby" single release on Tales from the pop punk world vol. 2 on RTTB Records (2014)
- "Parlor Tricks" digital and CD release with Broadway Recording Company (2015)
- "LeopardLife" digital and double CD anthology release with Broadway Recording Company
- Crosstown Rivals split cassette with the Vatican Press on Wiener Records (2015)
- Split cassette with Easy Out on Jerkoff Records (2015)
- 2 song Split vinyl 7-inch EP with the Prozacs on Jerkoff Records (2015)
- "Tale of the tape" split cassette with the Sweethearts on Jerkoff Records & Ratgirl Records (2016)
- "No Dress Code" single release on MoosterMania 5 compilation on Mooster Records (2016)
- "furbabies" full-length CD / digital with Broadway Recording Company (2016)
- 2 song split 7-inch vinyl EP with the 99ers released by Ratgirl records, Jerkoff records and Man Della Records (2017)
- "Euthanise Me" single released on The quest for maple syrup part two compilation release on Captain Crook Records (2017)
- "One fine day" (Chiffons cover) single released on Pop punk jukebox 2 compilation released on RTTB Records (2017)
- "Caturday Nights" full-length album release thru Broadway Recording Company (2017)
- "The Summer EP" EP & full-length release thru Broadway Recording Company (2018)
- "Caturday Nights forever" EP & full-length release thru Broadway Recording Company (2018)
