= Mikey Erg =

American musician (born 1980)

Mikey Erg (real name Mike Yannich, born February 7, 1980) is a punk rock drummer, guitarist, and vocalist, from New Jersey. He has played in numerous bands, most famously The Ergs!, but also Star Fucking Hipsters, The Dopamines, The Unlovables, Dirtbike Annie, Parasites, and The LLC (the house band on The Chris Gethard Show). In 2016, he released his first solo album, Tentative Decisions.

Raised as Mike Yannich in Old Bridge Township, New Jersey, he attended Old Bridge High School together with band mates Joey and Jeffrey Erg.

In 2013, a change.org petition was started to have Erg fill the vacant drummer slot in Against Me!. Although Atom Willard was eventually given the position, the petition caught the attention of the band's front-woman Laura Jane Grace, who then recorded a four song demo with Mikey for a project unrelated to Against Me!

== Discography ==
Artist	Title	Credit(s)	Label	Year
Dirt Bike Annie	It Ain't Easy Bein' Single (appears on 8 tracks)	Drums/backing vocals	Dirtnap Records	2002
Dirt Bike Annie	Show Us Your Demons	Drums/backing vocals	Dirtnap Records	2003
The Ergs!	dorkrockcorkrod	Lead vocals/drums	Whoa Oh Records	2003
Brook Pridemore	First Name/Last Name	Drums	Crafty Records	2004
The Unlovables	Crush, Boyfriend, Heartbreak	Drums	Whoa Oh Records	2005
Brook Pridemore	The Reflecting Skin	Drums	Crafty Records	2006
For Science	Way Out Of Control	Drums/backing vocals	Don Giovanni Records	2006
The Ergs!	Upstairs/Downstairs	Lead vocals/drums	Dirtnap Records	2007
The Measure (SA)	Songs About People...and Fruit N' Shit	Drums	Don Giovanni Records	2008
The Radio Faces	Party at the Bushwick Hotel	Bass/vocals	Art of the Underground	2008
Used Kids	Yeah No	Drums	Salinas Records	2009
Psyched To Die	Year One	Lead vocals/guitars	Dirtnap Records	2009
House Boat	The Delaware Octopus	Drums/backing vocals	It's Alive Records	2009
House Boat	Processing Complaints	Drums/backing vocals	Traffic Street Records	2010
The Measure (SA)	Notes	Drums	No Idea Records	2010
Star Fucking Hipsters	From the Dumpster to the Grave	Drums/backing vocals	Fat Wreck Chords	2011
The Slow Death	Turnstile Comix #1	Drums	Silver Sprocket Bicycle Club	2011
Mikey Erg	Valentine's Day	Lead vocals, guitar, bass, drums	Paper + Plastick	2011
The Slow Death	Born Ugly, Got Worse	Drums	Kiss of Death Records	2011
Mikey Erg	Fucifier	Lead vocals, guitar, bass, drums	Bloated Kat Records	2012
House Boat	The Thorns of Life	Drums/backing vocals	Traffic Street Records	2012
Alexander Kerns / Mikey Erg	Untitled Kerns / Erg split 7-inch	All instruments and vocals on B-side	Asian Man Records	2012
Mikey Erg / Barrakuda McMurder	Untitled split floppy disk	All instruments and vocals on A-side	Bloated Kat Records	2013
Pale Angels	Primal Play	Drums	Kiss of Death Records	2013
Worriers	Cruel Optimist	Drums	Don Giovanni Records	2013
Worriers	Sinead O'Rebellion	Drums	Yo-Yo Records	2013
Mikey Erg / Warren Franklin & The Founding Fathers	Untitled split EP	All instruments and vocals on A-side	Count Your Lucky Stars	2014
Worriers	Imaginary Life	Drums	Don Giovanni Records	2015
Connor Ratliff & Mikey Erg	The Spirit of Ratliff	Guitar and backing vocals	State Champion Records	2015
Mikey Erg	Tentative Decisions	Lead vocals, guitar, bass, drums	Don Giovanni Records	2016
Worriers	Survival Pop	Drums	Don Giovanni Records	2017
Mikey Erg	Waxbuilt Castles	Lead vocals, guitar, bass, drums	Don Giovanni Records	2019
Worriers	You or Someone You Know	Drums	6131 Records	2020
