= Dorkrockcorkrod =

Studio album by The Ergs!
- Released: June 15, 2004 (CD); September 9, 2005 (Vinyl)
- Recorded: 2003–2004
- Genre: Pop punk, punk rock
- Length: 35:22
- Label: Whoa Oh Records; Don Giovanni
- Producer: Christopher Pierce and The Ergs!

The Ergs! chronology
Dorkrockcorkrod (2004)	Upstairs/Downstairs (2007)

Dorkrockcorkrod is the debut full-length album by The Ergs!. Originally released in 2004, in 2017 Rolling Stone listed it as #34 on their "50 Greatest Pop-Punk Albums" list. The album was released on CD on Whoa Oh Records. Its vinyl pressing on Don Giovanni Records would be that label's first full-length release.

== Track listing ==
All songs written by Mike Yannich except where noted.

1. "First Song, Side One" – 0:21
2. "A Very Pretty Song for a Very Special Young Lady Part 2" – 1:46
3. "Extra Medium" (Joe Keller) – 2:05
4. "Fishbulb" (Jeff Schroek) – 2:14
5. "Most Violent Rap Group" – 1:24
6. "Pray for Rain" – 2:21
7. "Saturday Nite Crap-O-Rama" – 2:13
8. "Running, Jumping, Standing Still" – 2:23
9. "It's Never Going To Be the Same Again" (Joe Keller) – 2:30
10. "August 19th" – 2:22
11. "Maybe I'm the New Messiah" (Rick Mayall, Jeff Schroek) – 0:26
12. "Rod Argent" – 2:18
13. "Everything Falls Apart... And More" – 3:02
14. "Vampire Party" (Paul Roessler) – 2:31
15. "I Feel Better Tonight" (Jeff Schroek) – 1:54
16. "180° Emotional Ollie" – 5:32

== Personnel ==
The Ergs

- Mike Yannich – lead vocals, drums, percussion, rhythm guitar
- Jeff Schroek – lead and rhythm guitars, lead vocals on tracks 4 and 15
- Joe Keller – bass, Rik Mayall imitation on track 11

Additional personnel

- Christopher Pierce– backing vocals on track 2, production, mixing
- Tim Naumann– hardcore credibility on track 11
- Alan Douches– mastering
