= Worriers (band) =

American melodic punk band (2011–2025)

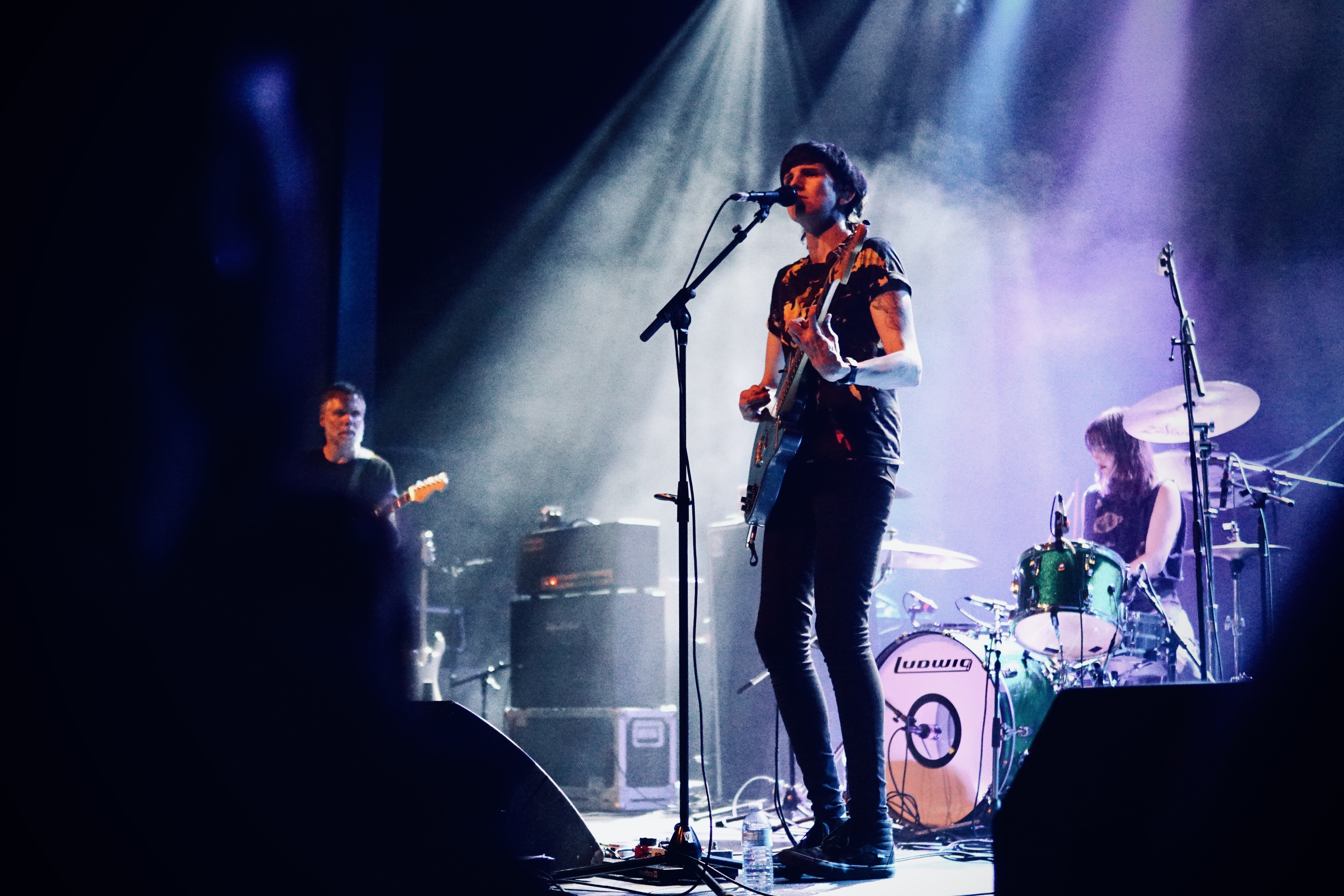
- Worriers in 2024

Background information
- Origin: Brooklyn, New York, United States
- Genres: Punk rock
- Years active: 2011–2025
- Labels: Don Giovanni; SideOneDummy Records; Ernest Jenning
- Spinoff of: The Measure (SA)
- Past members: Lauren Denitzio; Mike Huguenor; John Rockwell; Jenny Merullo; Justin Sullivan; Mike Catalano; Mikey Erg; John McLean; Rachel Rubino; Lou Hanman; Audrey Zee Whitesides; Nick Psillas; JP Flexner; Atom Willard; Frank Piegaro; Allegra Anka

Worriers were an American rock band from Brooklyn, New York. The band's music is centered on the songwriting of Lauren Denitzio, the former vocalist/guitarist of The Measure (SA). Primarily a solo project, Worriers also featured a rotating line-up of both touring musicians and in-studio contributors. The final live iteration of Worriers included lead guitarist Mike Huguenor, bassist John Rockwell and drummer Jenny Merullo. Alumni of the group as a touring and recording unit included members of bands such as Alkaline Trio, Speedy Ortiz, Beach Slang, Cayetana, The Ergs!, Caves, and Bridge and Tunnel, amongst others. They released records on Don Giovanni, No Idea, SideOneDummy, 6131 Records, Yo-Yo Records, and Ernest Jenning

In 2015, Worriers enlisted Laura Jane Grace of Against Me! to produce their debut album Imaginary Life. The band signed with SideOneDummy Records in June 2017, and released their second album Survival Pop in September of that year. Their final record, Trust Your Gut, was released on Ernest Jenning in September 2023.

== History ==
Worriers was formed by singer, guitarist, and songwriter Lauren Denitzio in 2011, following the end of The Measure (SA). Denitzio, at the time, had also found work as a visual artist, graphic designer and author – which is work that they continue to this day. The band released their first single "Past Lives" on No Idea Records in May 2011. It served as the title track to a three-track 7-inch EP released that September, which featured the digital bonus track "Made to Mend". Denitzio was joined on this recording by lead guitarist Mike Hunchback, bassist Dan Oestreich and drummer Jonathan Johansen.

2013 saw the release of two EPs from the project: Cruel Optimist via Don Giovanni Records in October, and Sinead O'Rebellion via Yo-Yo Records in November. For these recordings, Denitzio was joined by guitarist Rachel Rubino, bassist Tim Burke and drummer Mike Yannich (Mikey Erg). In 2015, Worriers released their debut studio album Imaginary Life. All songs were written solely by Denitzio, and produced by Laura Jane Grace of Against Me! For this record, the Worriers lineup included Denitzio, Rubino, Yannich, guitarist John McLean and bassist Audrey Zee Whitesides, with Lou Hanman of UK punk band Caves guesting on backing vocals.

The band signed with SideOneDummy Records in June 2017, and released their second album Survival Pop in September of that year. For this record, Denitzio was backed by Hanman on guitar, Nick Psillas on bass, and Mikey Erg on drums. With the scaling back of SideOneDummy's operations in early 2018, the band re-released the album with 6131 Records with the addition of two new songs.

On December 12, 2019, Worriers announced they would be releasing a third album titled You or Someone You Know, again with 6131 Records, on March 6, 2020. The lineup again included Psillas and Erg, with the addition of Frank Piegaro (ex-Ensign) on guitar. The record was produced by John Agnello. On May 21, 2021, it was announced that the band had contributed a cover of the Rancid song "Old Friend" to Lavasock Records' tribute to Rancid's album ...And Out Come the Wolves titled ...And Out Come the Lawsuits.

On January 19, 2023, Worriers announced a new full-length album, Warm Blanket, would be released by Ernest Jenning Record Co. on April 7. It was entirely recorded and mixed by Denitzio at home – other than drums contributed remotely by Atom Willard, formerly of bands such as Against Me! and Social Distortion. Along with the announcement was the release of lead single "Pollen In The Air", co-written with David Combs of Bad Moves and The Max Levine Ensemble.

On June 26, 2023, roughly six months after the announcement of Warm Blanket, Denitzio revealed that a second Worriers album would be released that year on September 15 entitled Trust Your Gut. In contrast to Warm Blanket's solo homemade recording process, Trust Your Gut was recorded in a studio with the current touring band line-up, in addition to The Hold Steady keyboardist Franz Nicolay. The title track of the album was released to coincide with the album announcement, with a music video inspired by the film Empire Records.

In April 2025, Denitzio announced that they would be folding the Worriers project following a series of final shows in the US. They cited burnout, and "not having fun anymore", as the key reasons the band was ending. "I've always said that being in a band is the most fun job in the world, but I've reached a point where too many expectations associated with that don’t align with my values anymore," they wrote in their newsletter Get It Together. "At a certain point, that overrides the fun parts."

== Discography ==
=== Albums ===
Year	Title	Label
2015	Imaginary Life	Don Giovanni Records
2017	Survival Pop	SideOneDummy Records / 6131 Records
2020	You or Someone You Know	6131 Records
2023	Warm Blanket	Ernest Jenning
2023	Trust Your Gut	Ernest Jenning

=== EPs ===
Year	Title	Label	Format
2011	Past Lives	No Idea Records	7" vinyl
2013	Sinead O'Rebellion	Yo-Yo Records	7" vinyl
2013	Cruel Optimist	Don Giovanni Records	12" vinyl, Digital
2021	The Old Friends EP	Bruiser Worldwide	Digital
