= The Besties =

American indie pop band

- Origin: Brooklyn; New York; United States
- Genres: Indie pop, punk, pop-punk, power-pop, oi!
- Years active: 2005–2009, 2014, 2017
- Labels: Skipping Stones Records; Hugpatch Records; Art of the Underground
- Members: Kelly Waldrop; Marisa Bergquist; Richard Francis Walsh IV; Frank Korn; Clayton Rychlik

The Besties were an American indie pop band from Brooklyn, New York. Their sound can best be described indie pop or "twee", although at shows they were known to introduce themselves as a punk band. TimeOut Chicago describes the band as sounding like "the Go-Go's on Epitaph Records", and Allmusic compares them to Cub and the All Girl Summer Fun Band.

== History ==
The Besties were formed when members Marisa Bergquist, Kelly Waldrop, and Rikky Walsh met while attending college in Tallahassee, Florida. Their first album, Singer, was released by Skipping Stones Records in 2006. Drum machines were used in the recording of this record because the band did not yet have a drummer. To fill this need, Frank E. Korn joined the band prior to the recording of their second album, Home Free, which was released in February 2009 on the Hugpatch label.

== Breakup ==
The Besties announced their breakup on October 12, 2009. They played their final shows December 4, 2009 at Asbury Lanes in Asbury Park, NJ and December 6, 2009 at Bruar Falls in Brooklyn, NY. The Asbury Lanes show also featured The Measure SA, Black Wine, Psyched to Die, and Night Birds. The Bruar Falls show also featured The Specific Heats and Bunnygrunt. The Besties' final release was a 7" single on Art of the Underground Records, "Terrible & True" b/w "Take 'Em All." The b-side was a cover of a song originally performed by UK punk band Cock Sparrer.

== Post-breakup activity ==
Following the band's split, members of the Besties have gone on to form numerous groups.

Marisa Bergquist has launched several musical projects. She formed a short-lived band called Old Books and performed in a duo called Ergquist (with Mikey Erg), before she co-founded the power-pop project Chandeli'ers, which recorded a self-titled 12" EP in 2013 on 1-2-3-4 Go Records/Tender Buttons and an LP in 2016 called Breaker on Dead Broke Rekerds/Dirt Cult Records. The band played their final shows in 2016. Subsequently, Marisa has formed a punk rock band called Headlines, which began in 2017. Additionally, she has been a frequent collaborator with New Jersey punk rock band Nervous Triggers, with whom she has played keys both on recordings and live.

Rikky Wlash formed a new alternative/indie rock band called Glyph City in 2014. He sings and plays guitar for the band. They have released new material in 2016 and 2017, and continue to record and play live.

== 2014 Reunion ==
The band reunited for a one-off reunion weekend, playing the Cake Shop in Manhattan during NYC Popfest on Thursday, May 29, 2014, as well as Asbury Lanes in Asbury Park, NJ on Saturday, May 31, 2014. The Cake Shop show also featured Dressy Bessy, Martha, Tape Waves, and Franny and Zooey. The Asbury Lanes show also featured Full of Fancy (who were also reuniting for the show), Mikey Erg, and brick mower. These reunion shows also functioned as the record release shows for the band's LP Home Free, which was being released on vinyl for the first time (having been originally available only on CD).

== 2017 Reunion ==
On Saturday, July 22, 2017, The Besties played a show at Sunnyvale in Brooklyn, NY for the 40th birthday party of longtime friend of the band, Fid. The show was a benefit for Planned Parenthood, and also featured The Ergs (also reuniting for the show, although playing secretly, having been advertised under the pseudonym "Fidnight Oil"), Shellshag, Weird Skin, and Nervous Triggers.
