= Hugpatch Records =

American record label

- Founded: 2006
- Founder: Maxwell Williams
- Status: Inactive
- Genre: Punk rock, Indie rock, Indie pop
- Country of origin: United States
- Location: Brooklyn, New York

Hugpatch Records is a record label based out of Brooklyn, New York. It was founded in 2006 by Maxwell Williams. It was originally a 7" single only record label, which gives it the reputation as "the world's tiniest record label." Its releases are limited to 500 copies of each record. Releases include singles by Brooklyn-based indie-pop band The Besties (HP01), Gijón-based pop group Nosoträsh (HP02) and Austin, Texas-based minimal pop trio Yellow Fever (HP03). In 2007, Hugpatch was one of the organizers of the pop music festival, NYC Popfest. Later on, the label began releasing full-length albums, beginning with The Besties' Home Free (HP08), originally released on CD, and later as a vinyl LP. The label also produces an internet radio show for the American Apparel radio station, Viva-Radio.com.

== See also ==
- List of record labels
