= Mitch Anderson =

Mitchell or Mitch Anderson may refer to:

- Mitch Anderson (24 character), fictional character from TV series 24
- Mitchell Anderson (born 1961), American character actor
- J. J. Anderson (Mitchell Anderson, born 1960), American basketball player
- Mitch Anderson/Outburst, leader of the Supermen of America
