= Super-Chief =

DC Comics character

- Jon Standing Bear, the third Super-Chief. Art by Phil Jimenez.

Publication information
- Publisher: DC Comics
- First appearance: (Flying Stag) All-Star Western #117 (March 1961) (Saganowahna of Dry Wells) The Adventures of Superman Annual #9 (1997) (Jon Standing Bear) 52 Week 22 (October 2006) (Saganowahna of Wisconsin) Superman #709 (May 2011)
- Created by: (Flying Stag) Gardner Fox (writer); Carmine Infantino (artist) (Saganowahna of Dry Wells) Mike W. Barr (writer); Dale Eaglesham (artist) (Jon Standing Bear) Geoff Johns (writer); Greg Rucka (writer); Grant Morrison (writer); Mark Waid (writer); Eddy Barrows (artist) (Saganowahna of Wisconsin) Chris Roberson (writer); Eddy Barrows (artist)

In-story information
- Alter ego: Flying Stag; Saganowahna of Dry Wells; Jon Standing Bear; Saganowahna of Wisconsin
- Team affiliations: Justice League; Black Lantern Corps; Supermen of America; Justice Riders
- Notable aliases: Saganowahna
- Abilities: Super-strength, super-speed, and extended lifespan

Super-Chief is the name of several fictional characters, including three superheroes and one supervillain, in the DC Comics universe. Created by Gardner Fox and Carmine Infantino, the first Super-Chief debuted in All-Star Western #117 (March 1961).

The second (villainous) Super-Chief debuted in The Adventures of Superman Annual #9 (1997) in a story by Mike W. Barr (writer) and Dale Eaglesham (artist). The third Super-Chief debuted in 52 Week 22 (October 2006), which was written by the writers' consortium of Geoff Johns, Greg Rucka, Grant Morrison and Mark Waid, and artist Eddy Barrows. The fourth debuted in Superman #709 (May 2011) and was created by writer Chris Roberson and artist Eddy Barrows.

== Fictional character biography ==
=== Flying Stag ===
Flying Stag was a member of the Wolf Clan in the 15th century. He was by far their best warrior and knew he would be able to win the contest to become Royaneh, or Supreme Chief, of the Iroquois. Out of jealousy, Flying Stag's rivals trapped him in a pit, where he prayed to the Great Spirit Manitou for help. A meteorite fell from the sky, which he fashioned into an amulet that gave him superhuman abilities. He honored Manitou and called himself Saganowahna, or Super-Chief. He became a hero and married White Fawn. The powers of the mystical meteorite caused him to outlive everyone he knew.

During Crisis on Infinite Earths, Super-Chief is temporarily transported to the 20th century. After returning to his time, he eventually dies in the late 19th century, as revealed in Swamp Thing (vol. 2).

In Weird Western Tales #71, a tie-in to Blackest Night, Super-Chief returns as a Black Lantern.

=== Villainous Saganowahna of Dry Wells ===
In Adventures of Superman Annual #9 (1997), a young Native American is revealed to be in possession of the meteorite amulet and has agreed to use the powers of Saganowahna to clear out the town of Dry Wells to make way for a gambling resort. He is defeated by Superman.

=== Jon Standing Bear ===
A new Super-Chief, Jon Standing Bear, is introduced in 52 #22. He is a young Native American veteran and ex-con who is chosen to succeed his grandfather as Super-Chief. Jon's father and grandfather are both upset with him, claiming he has neglected his heritage and his obligations. Saying Jon is the last of the line, Jon's grandfather charges him with becoming Super-Chief. Per his request, Jon kills his grandfather by suffocating him and takes the meteorite fragment.

Super-Chief joins a new version of the Justice League founded by Firestorm. However, he is killed by Booster Gold's robot Skeets, who Mister Mind has possessed and used as a cocoon. Jon ends up in an otherworldly location, where an elder named Flying Stag, apparently the original Super-Chief, reclaims his amulet. Flying Stag admonishes Jon's ignorance of the price that must be paid for magic. Railing about his failures, Jon disappears into a vortex of clouds.

In Blackest Night, Super-Chief returns as a Black Lantern. 52 writer Grant Morrison planned to have Super-Chief permanently resurrected, but was unable to fit it into the story.

The Super-Chief of Wisconsin agrees to join the Supermen of America. Art by Jamal Igle from Superman #714 (October 2011).

=== Saganowahna of Wisconsin ===
At the beginning of Superman #709, a new young Super-Chief is seen thanking Superman for an assist on capturing runaway supervillains in the Colorado desert. Superman refers to him as "Saganowahna" and the young man claims that he gains his powers from a "manitou stone" he wears around his wrist; he claims that some believe the stone to be Kryptonian in origin, though Superman is skeptical of the idea. The stone is later revealed to be a fragment of a Kryptonian sunstone that Superman scattered through time. Super-Chief accepts membership in Superman's new team, the Supermen of America.

== Powers and abilities ==
All versions of Super-Chief possess superhuman strength and durability, flight, and an extended lifespan.
