= Tentative Decisions =

Studio album by Mikey Erg
- Released: June 24, 2016
- Genre: Punk rock
- Length: 29:52
- Label: Don Giovanni
- Producer: Jeff Rosenstock

Professional ratings
Review scores
Source	Rating
AllMusic	3.5/5 stars
Noisey	favorable
New Noise Magazine	4/5 stars

Tentative Decisions is the debut solo album by Mikey Erg, released on Don Giovanni Records in 2016.

== Track listing ==
No.	Title	Length
1.	"Faulty Metaphor"	2:20
2.	"Boys & Girls & Tentative Decisions"	2:15
3.	"Comme Si About Me"	2:30
4.	"An Abundance of Julies"	2:16
5.	"Scenic Turnout"	2:21
6.	"Waiting Out The Winter"	3:25
7.	"(This Is Not) The First Time"	2:05
8.	"Song for New Britain"	2:51
9.	"Apart Time"	2:22
10.	"1001 Smashed Motel Rooms"	3:05
11.	"NyQuil and Sudafed"	4:22
Total length:		29:52
