= Primitive Enema =

Studio album by Butt Trumpet
- Released: 1994
- Recorded: July–August, 1993
- Genre: Punk rock
- Length: 30:54
- Label: Chrysalis
- Producer: Geza X

Butt Trumpet chronology
Primitive Enema (7-inch) (1994)	Primitive Enema (1994)	Show & Tell: A Stormy Remembrance of TV Theme Songs (1997)

Primitive Enema is the debut album by the Los Angeles punk band Butt Trumpet. It was produced by Geza X and released in 1994 by Chrysalis Records, with the recording sessions allegedly costing less than a thousand dollars. The album was the subject of a censorship campaign in Leominster, Massachusetts, after a mother campaigned against the sale of Parental Advisory-stickered records to minors. The band supported the album by touring with Fear. At timestamp 13:15, on track 18, there is a hidden song titled "Do It in the Butt." The album had sold more than 60,000 copies by the end of 2000.

== Reception ==
Professional ratings
Review scores
Source	Rating
AllMusic	2/5 stars
Robert Christgau	(dud)

Trouser Press wrote: "The double-bassist Los Angeles quintet ... is strictly out to offend on Primitive Enema, wielding a two-pronged fork of blaring punk aggression and tastelessly crude lyrics that make outrageous jokes of the three S's: scatology, sex and stoopidity." AllMusic's Stephen Thomas Erlewine called the group "crude and amateurish-and fiercely proud of it, by the way", and said the disc "made more sense on a smaller label". He also criticized Geza X's production, calling it "slightly too clean to make Primitive Enema sound dangerous."

== Track listing ==
- All songs written by Butt Trumpet.
1. "Clusterfuck" 1:51
2. "Funeral Crashing Tonight" 2:02
3. "I've Been So Mad Lately" 2:16
4. "Dicktatorship" 3:24
5. "Classic Asshole" 2:27
6. "Decapitated" 0:40
7. "Dead Dogs" 1:08
8. "I Left My Flannel in Seattle" 1:32
9. "I'm Ugly and I Don't Know Why" 3:10
10. "The Grindcore Song" 0:49
11. "Primitive Enema" 2:01
12. "I Left My Gun in San Francisco" 1:14
13. "Shut Up" 1:58
14. "Ten Seconds of Heaven" 1:22
15. "Yesterday" 2:33
16. "Ode to Dickhead" 0:52
17. "Pink Gun" 1:35
18. "Blind" 5:18
19. (Hidden track) "Do It In The Butt" 5:02

== Personnel ==
Butt Trumpet

- Bianca Butthole: vocals, bass
- Sharon Needles: vocals, bass
- Thom Bone: bass, occasional vocal backing, ego
- Blare N. Bitch: guitars, vocal backing
- Jerry Geronimo: drums, percussion, cymbals, vocal backing

Additional personnel

- Geza X., Jamie Schene, Andrea Beltramo (a.k.a. "The Butt Trumpettes"): vocal backing

Production

- Arranged By Butt Trumpet
- Produced By Thom Bone, with additional production by Geza X (deliberate error in liner notes is an inside joke)
- Recorded & Mixed By Geza X & Thom Bone, July 31-August 2 (per liner notes "real cheap")
- CD and cassette tape mastered By Dave Collins, Patricia Sullivan & Thom Bone; vinyl mastered By Bill Lightner & Thom Bone at A&M Studios and K-Disc in Hollywood, CA
- All Songs Published By Buttwrenching Music.
