= The Impulse International =

Rock and roll band from New Jersey

The Impulse International is a rock 'n' roll band formed in Jersey City, New Jersey in 2003.

== History ==
The band consists of three members: Julius A. Buck (guitar, vocals), J.D. Romeo (bass, vocals) and Rob C. Sterling (aka Ricardo Baron, aka Rob Farren, drums). Buck (a.k.a. Adam Rabuck) and Romeo formed the Impulse International after the dissolution of Buck's former band Dirt Bike Annie.

Originally called The Impulse, a man claiming to own the trademark for "Impulse" relating to music performance threatened to sue them. "The name of your band is in direct conflict with a Trademark that I own. Please find another name for your band and remove all references from the web including the name IMPULSE," he said. "This could get very expensive for you as I have owned the name Impulse under class 041 Entertainment services in the nature of band performances, since 1983. Please respond, as this is getting ready to be turned over to attorneys." They opted to add "International" to their name.

Dirt Bike Annie's drummer Tommy Vinton (also from Too Much Joy) joined the Impulse International briefly before Sterling took his place in 2005. The band often played shows in the greater New York City area before Buck relocated to Tampa, Florida in 2007. In August 2009, the band toured the U.S. South to support the release of the full-length album Point of Action. Point of Action was released simultaneously on LP by Deranged Records and on CD by Dirtnap Records. The band continues to write and record music.

== Discography ==
"Get Ready to Go" split single with Boy/Girl - 7" (self-release, 2007)
"Arm the Girls" b/w "Run and Hide" - 7" (Deranged Records, 2008)
"Saturday Suzie" b/w "One Girl, Eight Wheels" + "Something's Happening Here" - 7" (Mutant Pop)
"The Real Kid" b/w "The World Hates Me" - 7" (Deranged Records)
"Hollywood Underground" b/w "Gotta Run Home" - 7" (Killer Records, 2008)
Point of Action - full-length CD (Dirtnap Records, 2009)
Point of Action - full-length LP (Deranged Records, 2009)
10" mini-album (Puta Records, 2010)
