= The Ergs! =

American punk band

- Origin: South Amboy, New Jersey
- Genres: Punk rock, pop punk
- Years active: 2000–2008; 2010; 2016; 2017–present
- Labels: Dirtnap, Don Giovanni, Whoa Oh
- Past members: Mikey Erg; Jeff Erg; Joey Erg
- Website: dorkrockcorkrod.com

The Ergs! are an American punk rock band formed in 2000 in South Amboy, New Jersey, by three high school friends: drummer/lead vocalist Mikey Erg (Mike Yannich), guitarist/vocalist Jeff Erg (Jeff Schroeck), and bassist Joey Erg (Joe Keller). The band developed in the New Brunswick, New Jersey music scene. Through touring and recording the Ergs! became recognized on a national and international level, touring and playing with such noted acts as The Descendents, The Bouncing Souls, Lifetime, Less Than Jake, The Loved Ones, The Gaslight Anthem, Dillinger Four, None More Black, The Explosion, Municipal Waste, Lemuria, and more. They have appeared at a number of festivals including Riot Fest, Insubordination Fest, and The Fest, the latter of which the band played four consecutive years, including as a headlining act in 2008, and making a fifth appearance as a headlining reunion act in 2016.

== History ==
=== Early history ===
The Ergs! was formed in 2000 by Old Bridge High School students whose previous band the Flatliners (unrelated to other bands with this moniker) had broken up. The band members shared a common passion for all forms of music and culture with no desire to be pigeonholed. In a 2008 interview with Steve Bove of the Asbury Park Press, Joey Erg cited John Coltrane's seminal jazz record Giant Steps with instilling in the band aspirations "to maybe making music that was more than just punk." Even early songs poked fun at generic songwriting, such as "Xerox Your Genitals, Not the Ramones," which encourage punk bands to strive for their own sound, because there would only ever be one Ramones.

The band quickly recorded a pair of CD-Rs, f'n and Digital Endpoints, selling them at live shows throughout New Jersey. The band went on its first tour outside New Jersey as the support of Dirt Bike Annie, a noted pop-punk band for whom Mikey Erg also played drums.

New York's Whoa Oh Records took an early interest in the band and issued their first 7-inch, entitled 3 Guys, 12 Eyes, which was soon followed by a self-released CD-EP, "The Ben Kweller EP," whose artwork (and lyrics) only referred to indie darling Kweller, but not satirically as has been sometimes perceived. The Ergs set out on a brief tour in the spring/early summer of 2003 in support of The Ben Kweller EP with their friends and Whoa Oh labelmates, Charlie Brown Gets A Valentine (touring to promote their album "Dismissed"), called the "Who Grabbed My Ass? Tour". It began at the now closed Uncle Joe's in Jersey City, NJ, looped out west as far as Columbia, MO and ended with a show in an apartment in Philadelphia that featured Dirt Bike Annie.

=== dorkrockcorkrod ===
After a few tours around the United States, the band entered Technical Ecstasy Studios with Chris Pierce to record their first full length. dorkrockcorkrod was originally released on CD by Whoa Oh on June 15, 2004 and on vinyl on September 9, 2005 by Don Giovanni Records. While playing more and more shows at home to increasingly large and rabid audiences, the band began to draw attention on a national level, including that of hip-hop artist and Adult Swim contributor mc chris. This led to the band writing an original song, "All Kids Out Of the Pool" to be used in an Adult Swim promo spot. In the summer of 2005, mc chris chose The Ergs! and North Carolina's SNMNMNM as the openers for his 2 and a half month Revenge of the Nerd Tour.

With fans now awaiting the follow-up to dorkrockcorkrod, the band returned to Technical Ecstasy with Chris Pierce and emerged with the 7-track album Jersey's Best Prancers. The title and artwork parodied that of Lifetime. BuzzFeed included the album at number 24 on their "36 Pop Punk Albums You Need To Hear Before You F——ing Die" list.

=== Upstairs/Downstairs ===
On the strength of dorkrockcorkrod, Jersey's Best Prancers, and various singles, the Ergs! took their New Brunswick cohorts, Hunchback, on their Discover America Tour in the summer of 2006.

At the midpoint of the tour in Seattle, WA, the band, with Hunchback in tow, entered the studio of Conrad Uno, a seasoned record producer whose past credits include the Grammy-nominated debut of The Presidents of the United States of America, as well as Mudhoney and The Young Fresh Fellows.

Taking its title from an infamous nervous breakdown suffered by Can vocalist Malcolm Mooney, the resulting LP Upstairs/Downstairs was released by Portland, Oregon's Dirtnap Records. Styles which had previously been alluded to were introduced full-bore on the record.

The album's closing title track was an almost 20 minute expression of romantic remorse and mental instability that erupts into an abrasive noise collage.

Reception of the record among fans of the band's earliest pop punk work was at first confused, but the record found an audience quickly. Janelle Jones of Alternative Press reviewed the record, hailing it as "the punk album to beat this year." Stewart Mason of Allmusic rated it three and a half stars out of five, calling it "notably less willfully silly than what has come before." Mason praised one of the tracks "Books About Miles Davis" as "a particular gem." As the band embarked on another full-US tour, this time with Buffalo indie rock trio Lemuria.

During this tour, the band was contacted by New Brunswick punk rock veterans The Bouncing Souls who wanted the Ergs! to be a part of a tour with the Souls and Lifetime celebrating the generations of punk rock in New Brunswick and New Jersey at large.

More recording followed, with the band releasing numerous 7-inch vinyl EPs and singles, as well as more touring, both on their own and supporting larger acts such as Philadelphia's The Loved Ones and fellow NJ residents The Gaslight Anthem.

=== Hindsight Is 20/20 ===
Following the success of Upstairs/Downstairs, Dirtnap Records offered to issue a compilation record of the Ergs' now sizable catalog of singles, b-sides, and compilation appearances. The CD, entitled Hindsight Is 20/20 My Friend (after a line spoken by Chevy Chase in the movie Dirty Work) was released in the summer of 2008, just as the Ergs! and Hunchback took to the road again for the Jackalry Across America Tour. Despite the tour's success, by its end Hunchback had chosen to break up, and the Ergs! would follow suit in a matter of weeks, announcing that they would complete their remaining tour plans and play a final show in November at the Asbury Lanes.

In October 2008, the Ergs began their final bout of touring with dates supporting Less Than Jake alongside Landmines and Bomb the Music Industry!, followed by a Canadian and American tour which included 2 shows at Chicago's Riot Fest. This tour closed with a spot supporting Dillinger Four at the Brooklyn, NY record release show for D4's long-awaited 4th LP, Civil War.

The Ergs! bid farewell to their largest collection of fans from around the US and the globe at No Idea Records' The Fest 7 in Gainesville, Florida, where they were the only band on the headlining stage at the Fest to play two consecutive sets. During the first set, the band played songs from throughout their career, and during the second, played dorkrockcorkrod in its entirety.

On November 13, 2008, the Ergs! played an unannounced set at a Lemuria show at the Parlor, a New Brunswick basement. On Friday, November 14 they played Upstairs at the Khyber in Philadelphia. On Saturday, November 15, 2008, The Ergs! played 2 shows at the Asbury Lanes in Asbury Park, NJ. The band played long, retrospective sets at each show, and at the late show closed with an extended version Upstairs/Downstairs that eventually incorporated all the night's band members and much of the audience demolishing instruments.

=== Post-breakup activity ===
After the final Ergs! performance, several 7-inch records and compilation appearances were released posthumously. Though each release was planned prior to the breakup, some recording sessions and in some cases writing for these records took place after the final show. The band also honored a commitment to a friend of the band to play a set of their own songs as well as requested covers at his wedding, which took place after the final show, but was not open to the public. After their split, the members of The Ergs! went on to form numerous groups. Many of these bands have been collaborations with members of Hunchback. Major post-Ergs! projects include:

Mikey Erg has continued touring and recording with numerous bands, including The Unlovables, The Dopamines, The Slow Death, and Worriers, usually playing guitar or drums. Projects for which he was the primary songwriter included the hardcore band Psyched To Die and the duo Ergquist, before he began touring and recording as a solo musician. Although Mikey would play guitar and sing with no accompaniment in his early solo shows, his studio recordings would typically feature full-band arrangements, on which he played all the instruments. In 2016, however, Mikey formed a studio band to record the LP Tentative Decisions, produced by Jeff Rosenstock and released by Don Giovanni Records. Subsequent to this release, Mikey has favored playing live with a full backing band. Both Psyched To Die and Mikey's live band have featured former Hunchback member J Nixon on bass. Additionally, Mikey is the drummer for the LLC, the house band for the television show The Chris Gethard Show.

Joey Erg formed the surf-influenced hardcore punk band Night Birds with vocalist Brian Gorsegner, a multi-instrumentalist and veteran of numerous New Jersey bands. The original lineup of Night Birds featured Hunchback member Mike Hunchback on guitar. Hunchback departed after the band's second LP, and was replaced by guitarist PJ Russo. Subsequently, the band was signed to Fat Wreck Chords, and continues to tour and record.

Jeff Erg briefly joined Hunchback, playing in both bands on the final Ergs!/Hunchback tour. After briefly playing as a solo artist following the split of both bands, Jeff regrouped with the Hunchback rhythm section of J Nixon (bass) and Miranda Taylor (drums) to form the post-punk band Black Wine. Black Wine toured the US extensively and released 4 LPs, all released by Don Giovanni Records, before going on hiatus in 2015. In 2017, the band played sporadic shows before playing an official final performance. Although the band has not ruled out collaborating in the future, as of 2017, there are no plans for further live shows or new recordings.

=== 2010 Reunion ===
On December 5, 2010, The Ergs! and Hunchback played a pair of one-off reunion shows at Asbury Lanes. The motivation for the bands' decision to reunite was to raise money to offset medical bills for Hunchback bassist J Hunchback's mother, Jackie Nixon. The reunion shows coincided with many other fundraising efforts that weekend, including raffles, limited edition poster sales, auctions, and donated door money from other shows, including a show in Jersey City at which Mikey Erg performed solo, and Mikey Erg & (Ergs! roadie) Jay Insult's birthday party (also at Asbury Lanes), which featured a performance by The Hamiltons, a Canadian punk rock band with whom The Ergs! normally share an intense rivalry. On the day of the reunion shows, each band played an afternoon and an evening set, which were largely identical, although the Ergs! made the spontaneous decision to play the early song "Pool Pass" at the evening show. No new material was written or played, however the Ergs! performed a cover of "Tommy Gun" by The Clash, a song they had never played in full before, but had constantly referenced by teasing the opening drumroll and guitar riff to punctuate their live sets for years.

=== 2011 Karaoke Performance ===
On December 31, 2011, The Ergs! performed a set of live band punk rock karaoke at the Asbury Lanes New Year's Eve party. Between 9 pm and midnight, the band played as the backing band for audience members who signed up to sing from a repertoire of over 100 songs, mostly of the punk/hardcore/new wave idiom. While the band were billed by name, as per assurances in advance of the performance, no original Ergs! songs were performed, and at no point did any of the three band members perform lead vocals. The band had previously performed as the Asbury Lanes' house karaoke band during their active tenure.

=== 2016 Reunion, Goddamn Death Dedication, and Hindsight is 20/20, Volume 2 ===
In April 2016 it was announced that The Ergs! would be reuniting at The Fest's 15th anniversary. On May 6, 2016 Chris Gethard announced via Twitter that The Ergs! would reunite prior to Fest on The Chris Gethard Show at the May 12, 2016, taping. The band played a full set for the studio audience and viewers watching the live taping online, only a portion of which was broadcast on the episode. The full live performance was archived on the show's YouTube channel shortly thereafter.

The Ergs! played two sets at The Fest 15. On Friday, October 28, 2016, they played on the headlining stage at Bo Diddley Plaza in Gainesville. On Saturday, October 29, 2016, they played a surprise second set at a smaller Gainesville club called the High Dive, which was announced that same day.

Amidst practicing for these reunion shows, the band found time to return to the studio to record a new 4-song 7-inch EP, entitled Goddamn Death Dedication (a reference to a famous epithet used by radio DJ Casey Kasem), which saw release on Whoa-Oh Records. The record included one new song written by each band member, as well as "No Sharona," a no-wave-inspired cover of "My Sharona" by The Knack. Additionally, the band self-released the long-delayed second collection record, titled Hindsight is 20/20, My Friend Vol. 2: OK, Enough Reminiscing. The collection record featured recordings released subsequent to those on Vol. 1. The Goddamn Death Dedication material was not included on the collection.

=== 2017 Reunion ===
In July 2017, The Ergs!, under the pseudonym "Fidnight Oil", played a show in Brooklyn to benefit for Planned Parenthood; supporting acts included The Besties (also reuniting for the show), Shellshag, Weird Skin, and Nervous Triggers. In December of the same year, the Ergs! opened for the Descendents at the New Jersey stop on their 2017 tour and headlined a show the following day at the House of Independents in Asbury Park.

=== Subsequent Activity ===
In January 2022, The Ergs! released their first new recordings in 6 years, included on the EP Time is the Season on Dirtnap Records. In March 2024, the band announced a 20th anniversary tour and re-release of dorkrockcorkrod.

== Discography ==
=== Demos ===
Year	Title	Label	Format	Other information
2000	f'n	Frilly Pink Records	CD-R	
2000	Digital Endpoints	Frilly Pink Records	CD-R	Recorded in the style of a science fiction radio drama

=== EPs and singles ===
Year	Title	Label	Format	Other information
2001	3 Guys, 12 Eyes	Whoa Oh Records	7-inch vinyl	
2002	The Ben Kweller EP	Fongul Records	CD	2009 re-release on 12-inch vinyl on Freedom School Records
2003	Cotton Pickin' Minute	Prison Jazz Records	7-inch vinyl	features original country songs
2004	All the Hits!	Grateful Records (later repressed by Salinas Records)	7-inch vinyl	split with Milwaukee, WI's Modern Machines; features a cover of "Not a Second Time" by The Beatles.
2006	Jazz Is Like The New Coke	Art of the Underground	7-inch vinyl single	Part of the Art of the Underground single series.
2007	Lemuria Split	Whoa Oh Records/Art of the Underground/Yo-Yo Records	7-inch vinyl	split with Buffalo, NY's Lemuria.; features a cover of "Hey Jealousy" by The Gin Blossoms.
2007	Blue	Toxic Pop/Wallride Records	7-inch vinyl	b-side features a cover of "Blew" by Nirvana.
2007	Books About Miles Davis	Whoa Oh Records	7-inch vinyl	a-side is alternate mix of an album track from the Upstairs/Downstairs LP.; b-side features a cover of "Only Babies Cry" by Paul Baribeau.
2007	Grabass Charlestons Split	No Idea Records	7-inch vinyl	split with Gainesville, FL's Grabass Charlestons.
2008	Teenage Bottlerocket Split	Suburban Home Records	7-inch vinyl	split with Laramie, WY's Teenage Bottlerocket.; Volume 4 of the Suburban Home Under The Influence series.; The Ergs! cover "Blockhead" by Devo (Teenage Bottlerocket cover Green Day's "Having a Blast" on the flipside.; cover art by Mitch Clem, creator of Nothing Nice To Say.; cover art is double-sided, and parodies that of Duty Now For the Future by Devo on the Ergs! side (Dookie by Green Day on Teenage Bottlerocket's side).
2008	That's It...Bye	Don Giovanni Records	12-inch vinyl	cover art by Mitch Clem, creator of Nothing Nice To Say.
2009	The Measure SA Split ("A/B" version)	No Idea Records	7-inch vinyl	split with New Brunswick, NJ's The Measure SA.; Each band performs two original songs on their side of the split. However, the first song on each side was written by the other band for the opposite band to arrange and perform. Hence, The Ergs! first song is an Ergs! arrangement of a Measure composition, and vice versa.; The Ergs! song "I'll Thrash You When You Think of Me" is a faster and louder arrangement of their own song "I'll Call You When You Think of Me," previously released on The Ben Kweller EP.; cover art by Lauren Measure.; cover art is double-sided, and follows the "cover star" format used for all of The Measure's 7-inchs. Norm Macdonald is the "cover star" on The Ergs! side (Chevy Chase on The Measure side).
2009	The Measure SA Split ("C/D" version)	No Idea Records	7-inch vinyl	split with New Brunswick, NJ's The Measure SA, and an initially unannounced companion to the above split.; reversing the formula of the "A/B" version, here the first song on each side is The Ergs! and The Measure each performing their own arrangement of the songs they composed for the opposite band on the "A/B" version.; the second song by each band is a completely different original song than was included on the "A/B" version.; cover art by Lauren Measure is identical to that of the "A/B" version, with one distinction: here the Chevy Chase portrait appears on The Ergs! side (and the Norm Macdonald portrait appears on The Measure side).; sides of this record are listed as side C and side D, to further emphasize the companionship to the "A/B" version.
2010	Thrash Compactor	Grave Mistake Records/Firestarter Records	7-inch vinyl	features original thrash/hardcore songs recorded in 2003 and 2007; "Johnny Rzeznik Needs His Ass Kicked" references the lead singer and guitarist of The Goo Goo Dolls.; "I Shot the Devil's Son" references "I Shot the Devil" by Suicidal Tendencies in title, content, and introduction.; 7-inch is one-sided (no music appears on side B).
2016	Goddamn Death Dedication	Whoa Oh Records	7-inch vinyl	features one new composition apiece by each songwriter in The Ergs! This is the first all-new material the band wrote and recorded since the sessions for That's It...Bye and the split with The Measure [SA]; final song is a no wave-style cover of "My Sharona" by The Knack
2022	Time and the Season	Dirtnap Records	7-inch vinyl	features two new songs and two covers of '60s classics by The Zombies and The Remains.

=== Studio albums ===
Year	Title	Label	Format	Other information
2004	dorkrockcorkrod	Whoa Oh Records (CD) / Don Giovanni Records (vinyl)	CD, 12-inch vinyl LP	
2005	Jersey's Best Prancers	Don Giovanni Records	CD, 12-inch vinyl	Title and artwork parody Lifetime's Jersey's Best Dancers.; Released into CD in April 2006 and vinyl in January 2007.
2007	Upstairs/Downstairs	Dirtnap Records	CD, 12-inch vinyl LP	Features a collaboration with Hunchback on the title track

=== Compilation albums ===
Year	Title	Label	Format	Other information
2008	Hindsight is 20/20, My Friend	Dirtnap Records	CD, 12-inch vinyl 2×LP	Collection of previously released material from singles, 7-inchs, and compilation appearances; Contains "hidden" bonus tracks: "Pranksters," a cover of a theme song to a fictitious television show from a Saturday Night Live skit, and "All Kids Out of the Pool," a song the Ergs! recorded as a promo for the Cartoon Network's Adult Swim programming block.
2016	Hindsight is 20/20, My Friend Vol. 2: Okay, Enough Reminiscing	Self-Released	Digital Release	Collection of material from singles, 7-inchs, and compilation appearances released subsequent to first collection
