= Nosoträsh =

Spanish pop music band

- Origin: Gijón, Spain
- Genres: Indie rock
- Years active: 1996—present
- Label: Elefant Records
- Members: Bea, Cova, Malela, Montse, Natalia
- Website: ,

Nosoträsh is a Spanish pop music band formed in Gijón in 1994. Along with releasing records on the influential Elefant Records in Spain, Nosoträsh released a single in January 2007 in the United States with Hugpatch Records.

The group is made up of five women: Bea, Cova, Malela, Montse, and Natalia. Also Eugenia was a member of the group, but she left. The setup of the band is as follows: Natalia sings; Bea plays the guitar; Malela plays the guitar and sings; Montse plays the bass and sings; and Cova plays the drums. Eugenia played the bass.

== History ==
One 1994 night in a bar of Gijón, the five music-lover friends are cheerfully talking, when the possibility of making up a new music group arises. That very night, the group has chosen a name and the roles have been assigned. So they start to practise, and they compose some songs.

In May 1995, they record their first demo, surrounded by dogs, cows, goats, and a mouse.

In March 1996, they walked into a recording studio for the first time, to record some themes.

In July 1996, they opened their official website.

In March 1998, the first album of Nosoträsh, Nadie hablará de nosotras (nobody will talk about us), is finally released to the public. It is made up of thirteen songs.

The group wishes to introduce its album along with a tour, since the album is already in the market. However, their record company, RCA, prefers not to organize concerts until the sales of the album have risen above certain income. Nosoträsh insists on the tour as the best promotion for the album. When the summer ends, a tour, called Gira pendiente (pending tour) is organized.

The contract signed by RCA and Nosoträsh considered the possibility of an extension. The company considers that it has not obtained the expected benefits and finalizes the contract. These changes do not mean that the group is dissolved. They find a new independent company, Elefant, which supports the group when they leave the multinational. In this record company, Nosoträsh has total creative and artistic freedom.

In April 2000, the second album of Nosoträsh, Mi vida en un fin de semana (my life in a weekend) is released for sale. It is made up of twelve themes, composed by them.

In 2002, the third album of Nosoträsh, entitled Popemas ("popemas"), is finally released. The album is made up of short-duration themes, written by them, with a minimal instrumentation.

In 2005, their fourth album, Cierra la puerta al salir (close the door when leaving), was released.

They do not live in the same city; some of them live in Gijón and some others in Madrid.

== Discography ==
- Nadie hablará de... Nosoträsh (nobody will talk about us) (1998)
- Mi vida en un fin de semana (my life in a weekend) (2000)
- Popemas ("popemas") (2002)
- Cierra la puerta al salir (close the door when leaving) (2005)
