= Whoa Oh Records =

- Founded: 1998
- Genre: Punk, pop punk
- Country of origin: U.S.
- Location: Astoria, New York
- Official website: www.whoaohrecords.com

Whoa Oh Records is an independent record label based in Astoria, New York.

== History ==
Whoa Oh Records Records was founded in 1998 and is based in Astoria, New York. The label releases Lookout! Records styled pop punk bands, the most notable artists on their roster being Darlington (singer), The Ergs!, The Unlovables, and MC Chris. Other artists they have worked with include Kung Fu Monkeys, Zatopeks, The 20 Belows and Dirt Bike Annie. Their releases have been reviewed by numerous publications.

== Roster ==
- The Ergs!
- Kung Fu Monkeys
- Zatopeks
- The 20 Belows
- Dirt Bike Annie
- The Unlovables
- Darlington

== See also ==
- List of record labels
