= Butt Trumpet =

American punk band

- Origin: Los Angeles, California, U.S.
- Genres: Punk rock
- Years active: 1991–1994
- Labels: Chrysalis, Hell Yeah Records, Signal Sound Records
- Past members: Thom Bone; Bianca Butthole; Floor-Tom Morgan; Ian Outt; Zebra Feedback; Sharon Needles; Jerry Geronimo; Johnny Hostage; Christian Satan; Jenny Crabb; Janna Pirahna; Toni Tuna; Joan Jahs; Marcus Erectus; Fortune Nookie; Slade Bellum; Klark Kunt; Casey Anus; Skinnee Asscrack; Kerri Diseases; Blare N. Bitch; Athena Lee
- Website: buttwrenching.com

Butt Trumpet was an American, Los Angeles based punk band, that was known more for its crass lyrics and deliberately offensive style, rather than its music. The group featured two bassists among its members.

In 1994, their Chrysalis Records debut, Primitive Enema, was nearly banned from sale in a Massachusetts town after a mother heard her 12-year-old daughter playing it; she referred to the record as "audio porn." The group broke up soon after Primitive Enema was released, but three of the members regrouped in 1998 as Betty Blowtorch.

== Discography ==
- (1992): Butt Trumpet Jr. 5-song EP (Self-released, cassette only)
- (1992): "DICKtatorship" 7-inch (Hell Yeah Records)
- (1993): "The Grindcore Song" 7-inch (Signal Sound Records)
- (1993): "I Left My Flannel In Seattle" b/w "Pink Gun" 7-inch (Hell Yeah Records)
- (1994): Primitive Enema Album (Chrysalis Records)
- (1994): "Primitive Enema" b/w "Yesterday II, The Sequel 7-inch (Chrysalis Records)
- (1996): Quadruple Headache compilation (Last Resort Records)
- (1996): Board Stiff Album (INTERNET ONLY release)
- (1997): Show & Tell: A Stormy Remembrance of TV Theme Songs compilation (Gammon Records)
- (2000): Wrestling Slams and Jams compilation (EMI Records)
- (2005): Butt Trumpet/Dive Bar Junkies Split EP 10-inch (Felony Records)
- (2006): Butt Trumpet/Potbelly split 7-inch (PB Records)
- (2009): Censurado Trompeto Anal 8-song EP (Rumble Records) Spain
- (2010): Punk Rock Repo compilation Germany
- (2011): Cheap Ass Music Volume One compilation (Cheap Ass Records)
- (2013): Butt Trumpet/Youth Gone Mad Split LP
