= Bianca Halstead =

American musician (1965–2001)

- Also known as: Bianca Butthole
- Born: Bianca Halstead; May 5, 1965; The Bronx, New York, U.S.
- Died: December 15, 2001 (aged 36) New Orleans, Louisiana, U.S.
- Occupation: Musician
- Instruments: Vocals, bass
- Years active: 1990–2001

Bianca Halstead (May 5, 1965 – December 15, 2001), also known as Bianca Butthole, was an American rock musician, born in The Bronx, New York. She was the bassist and lead singer of the bands Betty Blowtorch and Butt Trumpet.

Halstead was killed when she accepted a ride from a drunk driver on December 15, 2001, in New Orleans. She was 36. Halstead is interred at Hollywood Forever Cemetery, Hollywood, California.

A substance abuse center, called "The Bianca Center for Substance Abuse," which opened in November 2008, is named in her honor.
