= Tish Ciravolo =

- Born: United States
- Genres: Rock
- Occupations: Bassist, guitarist, guitar designer
- Instrument: Bass guitar

Tish Ciravolo is a Los Angeles–based bass guitar player and guitar designer, and the president and founder of Daisy Rock Girl Guitars.

== Early years ==
Ciravolo grew up in Merced, California, where her best friend Barbara taught her to play guitar while they were in high school. Ciravolo—whose first exposure to a female playing rock bass guitar was Suzi Quatro as Leather Tuscadero on Happy Days—was a quick learner and by age 16 was on tour with a band called Plateau.

When Plateau played in Kansas City, she decided to stay there and enrolled in Penn Valley Community College as a journalism and business major. After receiving her degree, she moved to Los Angeles, where she balanced a series of day jobs (including waitress at Duke's Coffee Shop and assistant to Jay Leno and his former manager, the late Helen Kushnick) with amateur night performances at The Improv and Comedy Store.

Intent on being a rock star during the middle 1980s, she gravitated towards what became her primary instrument, the bass guitar. Like her influences Simon Gallup and Tim Butler, she played with a pick. "They kicked me out of the Dick Grove Music School after five minutes," she recalled, "because I didn't want to play with my fingers."

== Bands ==
Ciravolo played in several bands, including Rag Dolls, The Velvets (a female Psychedelic Furs-type outfit), They Eat Their Own (new wave pop) and, eventually, her own group, Shiksa and the Sluts. Then she entered her "big hair metal phase", as the bass guitar player for Lypstik from 1988 to 1992. "We had a billboard on the side of the Roxy and everything," she said. "We did the windmill head shaking routine when we played, which was big at the time. We were also house band at the Whisky for a time, and played in the Battle of the Bitches at FM Station." Finding other creative outlets, Ciravolo also made two independent films (The Wake and Birds & The Bees) and wrote a sitcom with her partner Karen Peterson.

In her early 30s, Ciravolo stopped performing for a while to have a family.

"Through all those years of playing music, of great success and crushing disappointment, I always had so much fun," Ciravolo said. "It's physical, it's artistic, and it's who I am at heart. These days, I'm in this punk band called sASSafrASS, and we do covers like "Cherry Bomb" by The Runaways plus original material. I'm kind of over the whole 'getting the record deal thing', and it's more fun than I ever had before. If I got a record deal now, it would probably interfere with everything I'm doing with Daisy Rock".

== Daisy Rock ==
In 2001 Ciravolo started Daisy Rock Girl Guitars. The name came after she watched her daughter draw a daisy, which looked like a guitar to Ciravolo. Daisy Rock increased in size, with 2006 sales reaching $2.4 million and Daisy Rock guitars and bass guitars available in more than 25 countries worldwide. The catalog includes acoustic and acoustic-electric guitars, electric guitars and electric bass guitars in a vibrant selection of colors. The company offers a range of models from popular lines such as the Butterfly, Daisy, Heartbreaker, Star, Pixie, Wildwood, Stardust Elite, Stardust Retro-H, Tom Boy and Rock Candy series. In 2007, it launched the Stardust Retro-H De-Luxe Series, the Rebel Rockit Series and the new Rock Candy Custom Special Bass, and released the very special Rock Candy Pink Label guitar that was hand crafted in the US by John Carruthers.

== Publications ==
- Girl's guitar method 1: Everything a girl needs to know about playing guitar! Book and CD (Van Nuys, California: Alfred Music Publishing, 2002; ISBN 978-0-7390-2906-0)
- Girl's guitar method 2: Everything a girl needs to know about playing guitar! Book and CD by Ciravolo with Daisy Rock Guitars (Van Nuys, California: Alfred Music Publishing, 2003; ISBN 978-0-7390-3175-9)
- Girl's bass method : everything a girl needs to know about playing bass! Book and CD (Van Nuys, California: Alfred Music Publishing, 2005; ISBN 978-0-7390-3675-4)
- Girl's guitar method complete: everything a girl needs to know about playing guitar! Book and CD (Van Nuys, California: Alfred Music Publishing, 2006; ISBN 978-0-7390-4556-5/Book only (2007),ISBN 978-0-7390-4168-0)
- Girl's guitar method complete: everything a girl needs to know about playing guitar! DVD by Janet Robin with Ciravolo. (Van Nuys, California: Alfred Music Publishing, 2006; ISBN 978-0-7390-4306-6)

== See also ==
- Alfred Music Publishing
- List of female bass guitarists
