= Imaginary Life =

Studio album by Worriers
- Released: August 7, 2015
- Genre: Indie rock, punk
- Length: 28:04
- Label: Don Giovanni Records
- Producer: Laura Jane Grace

Worriers chronology
Cruel Optimist (2013)	Imaginary Life (2015)	Survival Pop (2017)

Professional ratings
Review scores
Source	Rating
AllMusic	3.5/5 stars
Consequence Of Sound	B−
NPR	(favorable)
Punknews	4.5/5 stars

Imaginary Life is the debut full-length studio album by Worriers. The album was produced by Laura Jane Grace.

== Track listing ==
All songs written by Lauren Denitzio

No.	Title	Length
1.	"Jinx"	1:04
2.	"Parts"	1:53
3.	"Glutton For Distance"	3:07
4.	"Plans"	2:18
5.	"Unwritten"	2:58
6.	"Life During Peacetime"	2:55
7.	"Good Luck"	2:01
8.	"Yes All Cops"	1:46
9.	"They /Them / Theirs"	2:19
10.	"Advance Notice"	2:59
11.	"Most Space"	2:00
12.	"Chasing"	2:55
Total length:		28:11

== Personnel ==
- Lauren Denitzio – vocals, guitar
- John McLean - guitar
- Rachel Rubino - guitar
- Audrey Zee Whitesides - bass
- Mike Yannich - drums, backing vocals
- Lou Hanman - backing vocals
