= Maximum (character) =

- Maximum from Supermen of America #1, art by Doug Braithwaite.

Publication information
- Publisher: DC Comics
- First appearance: Supermen of America vol. 2, #1 (March 2000)
- Created by: Fabian Nicieza (writer); Doug Braithwaite (artist)

In-story information
- Alter ego: Maxwell Williams
- Team affiliations: Supermen of America
- Abilities: Can possess superhuman strength, speed, or senses at will, but only individually.

Maximum (Maxwell Williams) is a fictional superhero published by DC Comics. He first appeared in Supermen of America vol. 2 #1 (March 2000), and was created by Fabian Nicieza and Doug Braithwaite.

== Fictional character biography ==
Maxwell Williams is a young African-American high school athlete who is rendered quadriplegic after being injured while attempting to stop a racially motivated beating. LexCorp provides Maxwell with spinal implants that restore his mobility and give him superhuman abilities. Maxwell uses his powers to fight crime in Metropolis under the name of Maximum. Unlike the rest of the Supermen, Maximum's identity is public knowledge.

A disgruntled LexCorp employee discovers that S.T.A.R. Labs hid a capsule inside a special chamber called Lockdown 6 in the waters near Metropolis. Darkseid also wants the contents of Lockdown 6 and sends the Deep Six to retrieve it. In the Vega system, the Warlords of Okaara sense the danger presented by the capsule and attack Earth. While White Lotus negotiates with the Okaarans to save Earth, the chamber is opened and the Unimaginable, a powerful energy being, is released. The Unimaginable possesses Maximum, giving him godlike powers. Max's parents convince him to relinquish the power, which he disperses safely.

== Powers and abilities ==
Maximum's powers come directly from his LexCorp implants. He can use the implants to channel all his body's energies to maximize his strength, speed, reflexes, or senses to superhuman levels. However, he can only maximize one ability at a time.
