= Betty Blowtorch =

American hard rock band

Betty Blowtorch is an American all-female hard rock band from Southern California.

== Biography ==
Betty Blowtorch was formed in 1998 by Bianca Butthole, Sharon Needles, and Blare N. Bitch, three members of the punk band Butt Trumpet. The band recorded their 1999 debut EP, Get Off, with producer Duff McKagan (of Guns N' Roses). The EP was released on Foil Records. After releasing the 2001 album, Are You Man Enough?, the group toured with Nashville Pussy. During the tour, drummer Judy Molish and guitarist Sharon Needles left the group; Jennifer Finch from L7 joined in their stead.

On December 15, 2001, lead singer and bassist Bianca Butthole was killed in a car crash while on tour in New Orleans. The remaining group members disbanded.

In 2011, Betty Blowtorch began performing again with Mia X Rock NRolla on bass and vocals.

== Members ==
Current members

- Mia X Rock NRolla – bass, vocals
- Sharon Needles – rhythm guitar, vocals
- Blare N. Bitch – lead guitar
- Judy Molish – drums

Past member

- Bianca Butthole (deceased) – bass, vocals
- Jennifer Finch - bass

== Discography ==
- Get Off (Foil Records, 1999)
- Are You Man Enough? (Foodchain Records, 2001)
- Last Call (Foodchain Records, 2003)
- Betty Blowtorch - Live at the Masquerade, Atlanta GA (2020)
- Betty Blowtorch Live at Maxwells in N.J. 2001 (2020)
- Drum Solo (2021)
- TP Whoreder (2022)
- Stronger Then Fear (2022)
- Touch Too Much (with GayC/DC) (2024)
