= The Unlovables =

American pop punk band

- Origin: New York City, United States
- Genre: Pop punk
- Years active: 2003 – current
- Labels: Whoa Oh Records; Crafty Records; Knock Knock Records; Art Of The Underground Records
- Members: Hallie Bulleit (bass/vocals); Frank Leone (guitar); Mike Yannich (drums); Fid (lead guitar)
- Past members: Chelsea Lacatena (vocals); Christian Stefos (lead guitar); Mat Ranauro (lead guitar)

The Unlovables were a New York City based pop punk band. The band formed after bassist/singer Hallie Bulleit recorded a handful of songs for a present with Adam Rabuck (of Dirt Bike Annie) who encouraged her to continue playing music. The band recorded and released two full-length records on Whoa Oh Records as well as EPs and other compilation appearances. The band gained more popularity after Adult Swim used the song "What You Want/What You Got" in a 30-second Bleach Promo. The Unlovables were a perennial crowd favorite during the early 2000's underground pop punk boom, known primarily for their catchy sing-along songs and pleasing vocals. The band's last release was 2015's Reunion Show split with Dirt Bike Annie and their last live performance was at Fest 15 in 2016. While no official breakup announcement was ever put out, the band has not been active in 10 years and no announcements regarding new material or shows have been forthcoming.

== Discography ==
=== Full lengths ===
- Crush, Boyfriend, Heartbreak (2004) CD - Whoa Oh Records
- Heartsickle (2007) CD - Whoa Oh Records LP - Crafty Records

=== Splits ===
- "Reunion Show" (2015; split LP w/ Dirt Bike Annie) - Whoa Oh Records

=== EPs ===
- "Singles Club" 7 Volume 15" - Art Of The Underground Records
- "Punk Rock Club" CDEP - Knock Knock Records

=== Compilations ===
- NY vs NJ Punk Rock Battle Royal" CD - Crafty Records
- Nut Boppin' Whoppers - Squirrel Records
- God Save The Queers - Asian Man Records

=== Video/DVD ===
- Chemical X DVD Music Video Compilation - Geykido Comet Records
- Weekend At Bernies (The Queers) - Doheny Records
