= Supermen of America =

DC Comics superhero team

- Supermen of America #1, artist Dave Gibbons

Publication information
- Publisher: DC Comics
- First appearance: (Original); Supermen of America #1 (March 1999) (Second); Superman #714 (October 2011)
- Created by: (Original); Stuart Immonen writer (Second) Chris Roberson (writer), Jamal Igle (artist)

In-story information
- Base(s): (Original); Outreach 1 (Second); Mobile
- Member(s): (Original); Brahma; Loser; Maximum; Outburst; Pyrogen; Psilencer; White Lotus (Second); Superman; Superboy; Supergirl; Steel; Livewire; Iron Munro; Super-Chief

The Supermen of America is the name of two superhero teams published by DC Comics. The original group first appeared in a special written by Stuart Immonen published in 1999, and a later mini-series written by Fabian Nicieza, which was published in 2000. The second group debuted in Superman #714 in 2011.

The Supermen of America appear in the second season of the television series Superman & Lois.

== Historical Supermen ==
SOA membership card, 1940

The original Supermen of America was an official Superman fan club from the 1940s. Comic readers could send away for and receive special membership cards that also doubled as decoders. Members also received buttons and special certificates.

== Fictional history ==
=== Original team ===
The members of the first Supermen of America are young metahumans gathered by Outburst after the shooting death of singer Junior K-D from the boy band Crossfire. Outburst and his family had been saved from death at Doomsday's hands by Superman. The young naive meta is willing to accept Lex Luthor's funding for a team of superheroes to protect the city in Superman's absence. Although Luthor volunteered money, Outburst is tasked with recruiting the members.

Outburst first recruits his girlfriend White Lotus, a young meta trained by the Warlords of Okaara, then he gathers Brahma, Loser, Pyrogen, and Psilencer. They were salaried heroes but they were determined to protect the city from villains emboldened by news of Superman's apparent death.

They refurbish buildings across Metropolis and turn them into community centers. The main building Outreach 1 serves as the team's headquarters. After Psilencer's untimely death by a gang member, Outburst and his inexperienced teammates are deeply shaken and reconsider their vocation. The team meets and recruits Maximum, the angry young protector of Suicide Slum, a chronically poor section of Metropolis. A former athlete, Maximum would have remained quadriplegic without special implants provided by Lexcorp.

A disgruntled Lexcorp employee discovers that S.T.A.R. Labs had hidden a capsule inside a special holding chamber called Lockdown 6 in the waters near Metropolis. Luthor successfully deploys Pyrogen to retrieve the capsule from Lockdown 6, but he encounters the villainous group Deep Six and is rebuffed. Darkseid, lord of Apokolips, also wanted the contents of Lockdown 6 and had sent the Deep Six to retrieve them. In the Vega system, the Warlords of Okaara sense the danger presented by the capsule, and take preventative measures.

The Okaarans overpower Earth's defensive forces and White Lotus hurries to negotiate a peace settlement before they "cleanse' the planet. To save Earth from worse attacks, while White Lotus is negotiating with the Okaarans, the chamber is opened and the Unimaginable is unleashed. The Unimaginable's energy form possesses Maximum and he temporarily gains immense power. Maximum's parents convince him to relinquish the power, which he disperses safely.

In exchange for the Supermen's silence about his involvement with the Unimaginable fiasco, Lexcorp cuts its ties with the Supermen of America charities. Lex Luthor signs all property deeds over to the organization, including Outreach 1.

Slaughter of the SOA, from Omac Project No. 6 (2006)

==== Current status ====
Several members of the group are seen during the 2006 Infinite Crisis event in the pages of The OMAC Project No. 6. The team is confronting several OMACs, technologically advanced warriors controlled by a central intelligence that wishes to corral superhuman activities, even if it means using murder. The OMACs analysis states the team is "67.89% neutralized". The final fate of the SoA remains unrevealed.

=== Second team ===
Superman founds the new SoA; art by Jamal Igle from Superman #714 (2011).

After a months-long walk across the US during the "Superman: Grounded" storyline, Superman recruits several allies into a new group named after the former SoA. Superman family members Superboy, Supergirl, and Steel joined the team, along with Livewire and Iron Munro.

== Membership ==
=== Original team members ===
- Outburst (Mitch Anderson) – Outburst is the team leader and has magnetism manipulation.
- White Lotus (Nona Lin-Baker) – White Lotus has a malleable Auric forcefield and was trained in martial arts by the Warlords of Okaara. She was the offspring of African-American and Asian parents.
- Brahma (Cal Usjak) – Brahma originally possessed superhuman strength and durability. In the mini-series he discovered the ability to change his size as well, but the larger he grew the more petrified and stonelike his body became.
- Pyrogen (Claudio Tielli) – Pyrogen is a powerful fire manipulator and a hothead.
- Loser (Theo Storm) – Loser possesses a powerful dermal force field capable of withstanding antimatter.
- Psilencer (Tim Thomas Townsend) – Psilencer is a prescient telepath and team tactician, killed by a gang member.

==== Later additions ====
- Maximum (Max Williams) – Maximum is an African-American teenager created by Fabian Nicieza for the mini-series. He can channel energy to increase his strength, speed, and senses to superhuman levels, but only one at a time.

=== Second team members ===
- Superman (Kal-El / Clark Kent)
- Superboy (Kon-El / Conner Kent)
- Supergirl (Kara Zor-El / Linda Lang)
- Steel (John Henry Irons)
- Livewire (Leslie Willis)
- Arnold "Iron" Munro
- Super-Chief (Saganowhana)

== In other media ==
Mitch Anderson (portrayed by Ian Bohen) and a variation of the Supermen of America appear in Superman & Lois. The group consists of Tag Harris (portrayed by Wern Lee), Jesse Vance (portrayed by Evelyn Gonda), and an unnamed boy (portrayed by Dominique Termansen), who all possess Kryptonian abilities.
