= Survival Pop =

Studio album by Worriers
- Released: September 29, 2017
- Studio: Rancho Recordo
- Genre: Indie rock, punk
- Length: 34:04
- Label: SideOneDummy Records, 6131 Records
- Producer: Marc Jacob Hudson

Worriers chronology
| Imaginary Life (2015) | Survival Pop (2017) | You or Someone You Know (2020) |

Professional ratings
Review scores
| Source | Rating |
|---|---|
| The A.V. Club | A |
| Punknews | 4.5/5 stars |

Survival Pop is the second full-length album by Worriers. It has an accompanying zine. Originally released by SideOneDummy Records in 2017, the album was reissued with two extra songs by 6131 Records upon their signing the band in late 2018.

== Track listing ==
All songs written by Lauren Denitzio and Worriers.

1. My 85th Rodeo – 02:43
2. Not Your Type – 03:08
3. The Possibility – 03:06
4. Gaslighter – 02:08
5. No More Bad News - 03:46†
6. What We're Up Against – 03:19
7. Future Me – 03:08
8. The Saddest Little Waffle House in Eastern Pennsylvania - 02:54†
9. Self Esteemed – 02:42
10. No Thanks – 02:19
11. Glutton (Reprise) – 02:52
12. WTF Is Sleep? – 02:50
13. Best Fear / Worst Fantasy – 02:35
14. Open Heart – 03:15

† Only on the 6131 Records 2018 reissue.

== Personnel ==
- Lauren Denitzio – guitar, vocals
- Lou Hanman – guitar, vocals
- Mikey Erg – drums, vocals
- Nick Psillas – bass
- John McLean – guitar
