= Daisy Rock Girl Guitars =

Guitar company

- Type: Subsidiary
- Industry: Musical Instruments
- Founded: 2000; 26 years ago
- Founder: Tish Ciravolo
- Headquarters: Van Nuys, California, United States
- Area served: Worldwide
- Products: Electric and acoustic guitars, basses, ukuleles
- Parent: KMC Music
- Website: daisyrock.com

Daisy Rock Girl Guitars is an American guitar company founded in 2000 by Tish Ciravolo.

== History ==
Tish Ciravolo credits her oldest daughter Nicole for inspiring her to create Daisy Rock Girl Guitars. When Nicole was one-and-a-half years old, she drew a picture of a daisy while coloring with her mother. Tish was inspired to draw a guitar neck and headstock on the picture. She developed the design and took it to her husband, Michael Ciravolo, the President of Schecter Guitar Research.

The resulting first model, the "Daisy" guitar, debuted in November 2000 at Seattle's ROCKRGRL music conference. During the conference, musician Courtney Love saw the guitar and liked it so much she autographed it. In 2006, the Courtney Love signed Daisy Rock Guitar was inducted into the NAMM Museum of Making Music, along with the original drawings by Nicole Ciravolo.

Daisy Rock Guitars entered into a partnership and under this agreement, Alfred Publishing became the co-owner and distributor of Daisy Rock Girl Guitars. Sales in 2003 grew surpassed $1 million. In 2004, sales surpassed $2 million.

Daisy Rock Guitars and Alfred Publishing terminated their partnership in 2016. That same year, Daisy Rock Girl signed an agreement with KMC Music, a company belonging to corporate group Jam Industries. KMC distributes Daisy Rock products worldwide.
