= Dirt Bike Annie =

American pop punk group

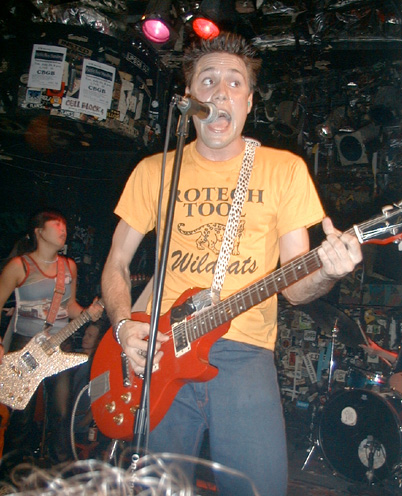
- Jeanie Lee and Adam Rabuck of Dirt Bike Annie

Background information
- Also known as: DBA, The Lee Majors
- Origin: Jersey City, New Jersey, United States
- Genres: Pop punk, Power pop
- Years active: 1993–2005, 2010
- Labels: Mutant Pop, Dirtnap, Whoa Oh, Stardumb, Richie
- Past members: Adam Rabuck (guitar, vocals); Jeanie Lee (guitar, vocals); Dan Paquin (bass, vocals); Mike Yannich (drums); Heth Weinstein aka Dirt Bike Deano (drums); Tommy Vinton (drums); Dennis Donaghy (drums)

Dirt Bike Annie was a rock band formed in New York City that played pop punk and power pop music.

== Band history ==
Dirt Bike Annie was formed in 1993 by Adam Rabuck while he was a student at New York University. The band's two other consistent members throughout the years were bassist/vocalist Dan Paquin and guitarist/vocalist Jeanie Lee. Drummers in the band included Mike Yannich, Heth Weinstein (who during his tenure with the band was called "Dirt Bike Deano"), Tommy Vinton from Too Much Joy, and Dennis Donaghy.

At the top of 1996, Dirt Bike Annie released their first 7" on their own label called Richie Records.

During the early phase of the career of rapper MC Chris, Dirt Bike Annie regularly performed as his backing band under their stage name, The Lee Majors.

In 2003, the band contributed two songs to the Project Gotham Racing 2 soundtrack.

After a decade of touring and releasing records, the group disbanded in 2005 when Lee and Paquin left the band. One of their last shows together was on May 3 of that year, opening for MC Chris at the Continental in New York City. Lee left the band first, and Paquin decided to leave shortly thereafter. At that point, the remaining members decided it best to break up the band for good.

== After disbanding ==
Founder, guitarist and lead singer Adam Rabuck has gone on to form The Impulse International and Rock University at Pennridge High School. Yannich (a.k.a. "Mikey Erg") has been a prolific performer in the punk scene as a songwriter, solo performer, and drummer for The Ergs! and several other bands.

In 2010, Rabuck, Paquin and Mike Yannich played a 90-minute reunion set at the Insubordination Fest in Baltimore.

On June 10, 2023, Rabuck, Lee, Paquin and Yannich reunited to perform at Bloated Kat Records' Bloated Fest at TV Eye in Queens, NY. It was their first performance with this lineup in nearly 20 years.

The four also contributed to the Whimsyland album, written by Chadd Derkins and released on Bloated Kat Records.

== Discography ==
=== CDs ===
- Hit The Rock — Mutant Pop Records, 1999
- Live Jersey City 2000: Sweatin' to the Oldies — Mutant Pop Records, 2000
- It Ain't Easy Bein' Single (Vinyl EPs and Rarities) — Dirt Nap Records, 2001
- The Ellis Island Rendezvous — Stardumb Records, 2002 Split with The Popsters.
- Show Us Your Demons — Dirt Nap Records, 2003

=== Vinyl ===
- It Ain't Easy Bein' Stupid EP — Richie Records, 1996
- Choco-Berri Sugar Pops EP — Mutant Pop Records
- Night of the Living Rock and Roll Creation EP — Knock Knock Records
- The Wedding EP — Whoa Oh Records Split double EP with the Kung Fu Monkeys.
