= Upstairs/Downstairs =

Studio album by The Ergs!
- Released: May 15, 2007
- Genre: Pop punk, punk rock
- Length: 45:17
- Label: Dirtnap Records
- Producer: Conrad Uno

The Ergs! chronology
Jersey's Best Prancers (2006)	Upstairs/Downstairs (2007)

Upstairs/Downstairs is the second and final full-length album by The Ergs!.

== Artwork ==
One version of the cover had a slash upstairs / downstairs on the artwork with words inside two arrows on the stairs, but other versions remove the slash and are simply upstairs downstairs inside the two arrows.

== Track listing ==
1. "Your Cheated Heart" – 0:55
2. "2nd Foundation" – 2:09
3. "Boston, Mass." – 0:48
4. "The Clocks, The Clocks" – 1:03
5. "It'll Be OK" – 2:39
6. "Bike Shoppe" – 2:14
7. "Fluorescent Stars" – 1:25
8. "See Him Again" – 3:08
9. "Things I Could Never Find A Way To Say" – 0:32
10. "Hysterical Fiction" – 2:02
11. "Stinking Of Whiskey Blues" – 3:38
12. "Trouble In River City" – 1:33
13. "Girls Of The Market Square" – 2:30
14. "Books About Miles Davis" – 2:32
15. "Upstairs/Downstairs" – 18:09

== Personnel ==
The Ergs

- Mike Yannich – Drums/Vocals
- Jeff Schroek – Guitar/Vocals
- Joe Keller – Bass Guitar

Additional personnel

- Mike Catalano – Guitar
- Craig Mileski – Keyboards
- Jason Nixon – Bass
- Miranda Taylor – Drums

== Reception ==
Professional ratings
Review scores
Source	Rating
Allmusic	link

Brian Schultz of Punknews.org rated the album three out of five stars. Stuart Mason of Allmusic rated it three and a half out of five.
