= Dolly Fox =

American actress and producer

Y. Dolly Fox
- Born: Yolande Dolly Fox
- Occupations: actress, producer, philanthropist
- Spouse: John Campbell (1991–1993; his death)
- Children: Paris Campbell Grace
- Parent(s): Matthew M. Fox (father); Yolande Betbeze (mother)
- Relatives: Cherif Guellal (stepfather)

Yolande Dolly Fox Campbell, known professionally as Dolly Fox, is an American actress, producer, and philanthropist.

== Early life and family ==
Fox is the daughter of Matthew M. Fox, the former vice president of Universal Pictures, and Yolande Betbeze Fox, a singer and activist who was crowned Miss America 1951. Her father died of a heart attack in 1964.

Her mother purchased the Newton D. Baker House in Georgetown, Washington, D.C. from Michael Whitney Straight and Nina Gore Auchincloss and Fox spent the remainder of her childhood here, and in Paris and Los Angeles. The mansion had previously been the residence of Jacqueline Kennedy after the assassination of John F. Kennedy in 1963.

As a child, Fox visited her maternal grandmother, Ethel Betbeze, in Point Clear, Alabama.

== Career ==
Fox acted and sang in many stage productions at the Red Mountain Theater Company, located in Birmingham, Alabama. In addition to many musical comedies she starred on tv soap opera for years. She also was a Zoli model. and was an editor for Andy Warhol's magazine Interview. She was on the ABC soap opera " All MY Children" and NBC's "Another World".

She is the founder and CEO of Y.D. Fox Entertainment, a company that produces films, television shows, and stage productions. She produced the play "Women Behind Bars in 2020. a movie " Theshold " She was on the board of the PATH fund (Performers that Help), as well as the Executive producer of their yearly fundraiser "Rockers on Broadway" for many years, mentoring youth pursuing the theater. Fox serves as an advisory board member for the Felix Organization, a non-profit organization benefiting foster children in New York. In 2024, she launched the first star studded live musical review to fund the summer camp program started only 3 years ago; Felix Camp Pride. This is the only existing LGBTQIA sleep away camp for foster children in the entire USA (of this writing 9/24 ) Fox is a member of the Actors' Equity Association, American Federation of Television and Radio Artists, and the Screen Actors Guild.

Fox produced a musical showcase fundraiser at The Cutting Room in New York City featuring performances by N'Kenge, Jahzara Martin, Darryl McDaniels, Sammy Rae and the friends and Alexa Ray Joel.

In 2019, Fox served as a judge for the Miss Alabama pageant in Birmingham.

In June 2024, she joined the producing team for the Broadway play Dorothy Dandridge! The Musical.

== Personal life ==
Fox married the American blues musician John Campbell in 1991, who died in 1993. From her marriage to Campbell, she has one daughter, Yolande Paris Campbell Grace.

Fox lives in New York City.
