= Paris Campbell Grace =

American TikToker, comedian, and singer

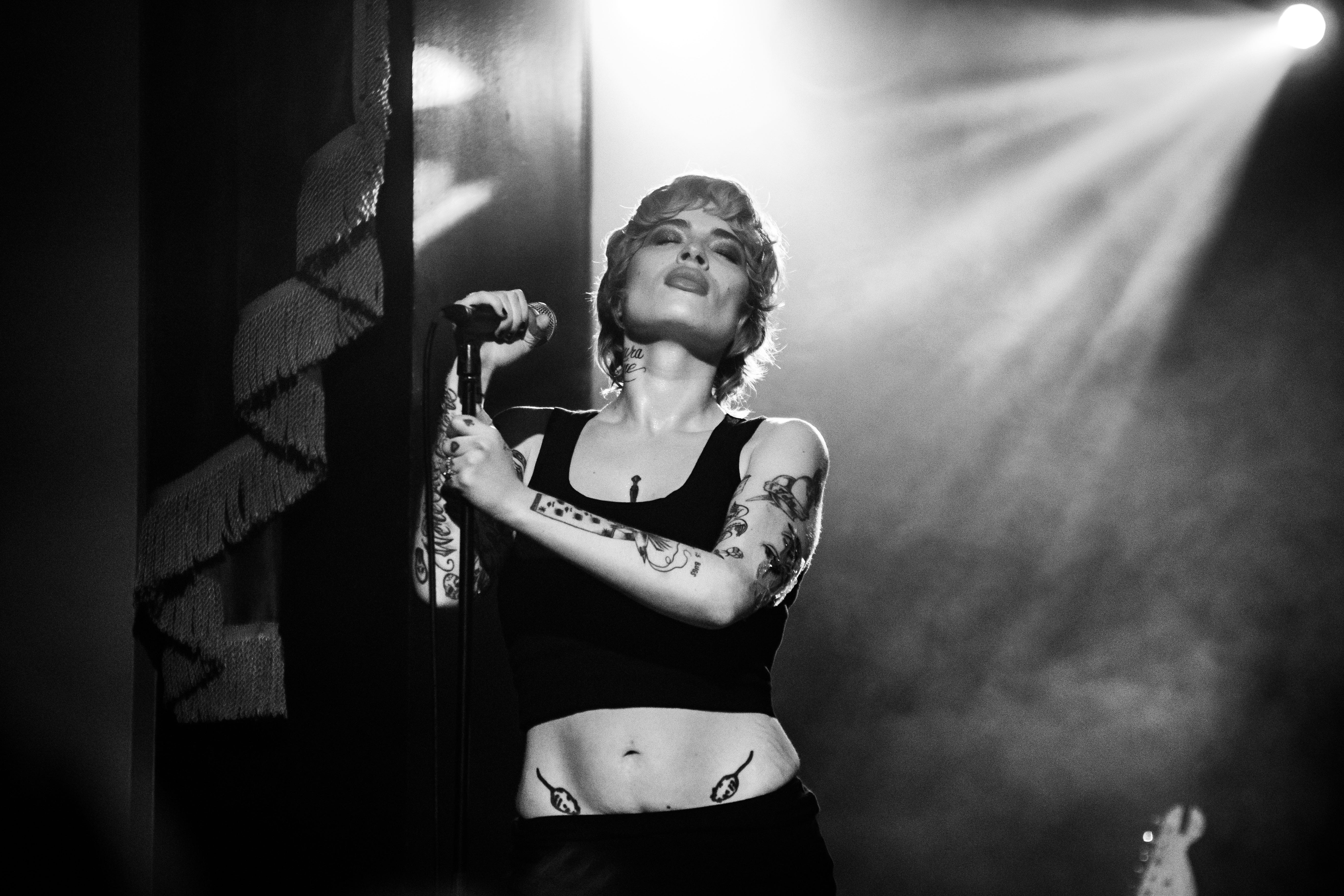
- Campbell in 2024
- Born: Yolande Paris Campbell; December 23, 1992 (age 33); New York, New York
- Education: Virginia Commonwealth University
- Occupations: Internet celebrity Comedian; Singer-songwriter
- Height: 5 ft 10 in (178 cm)
- Spouse: Laura Jane Grace (m. 2023; sep. 2025)
- Parent(s): Yolande Dolly Fox (mother); John Campbell (father)
- Relatives: Yolande Betbeze Fox (grandmother); Matthew M. Fox (grandfather); Cherif Guellal (step-grandfather)

TikTok information
- Page: grlchld
- Followers: 593.9 K
- Last updated: April 13, 2026
- Website: www.grlchld.com

Paris Campbell Grace is an American TikToker, comedian, and singer-songwriter. She began her career in comedy in 2012 and has performed at various clubs in New York City. Campbell started working on musical projects with her then wife, punk rock musician Laura Jane Grace, in 2023. Together with Grace, she joined musicians Matt Paton of Drive-By Truckers and Mikey Erg of The Ergs! to form the punk rock band the Mississippi Medicals. She was also a member of the band Laura Jane Grace and the Trauma Tropes.

== Early life and family ==
Campbell was born to Yolande "Dolly" Fox Campbell, an actress and philanthropist, and John Campbell, a musician. Her father died when she was an infant. Campbell's maternal grandparents were Matthew M. Fox, the former vice president of Universal Pictures, and Yolande Betbeze Fox, an opera singer and feminist activist who was crowned Miss America 1951. Campbell spent part of her childhood at her grandmother's mansion, the Newton D. Baker House, in Georgetown, Washington, D.C., where she was raised by her grandmother and her grandmother's partner, Cherif Guellal, who was the Algerian Ambassador to the United States.

Campbell was educated at the Southern France Youth Institute in Villesèque-des-Corbières and at The Grier School, an all-girls boarding school in Tyrone, Pennsylvania.

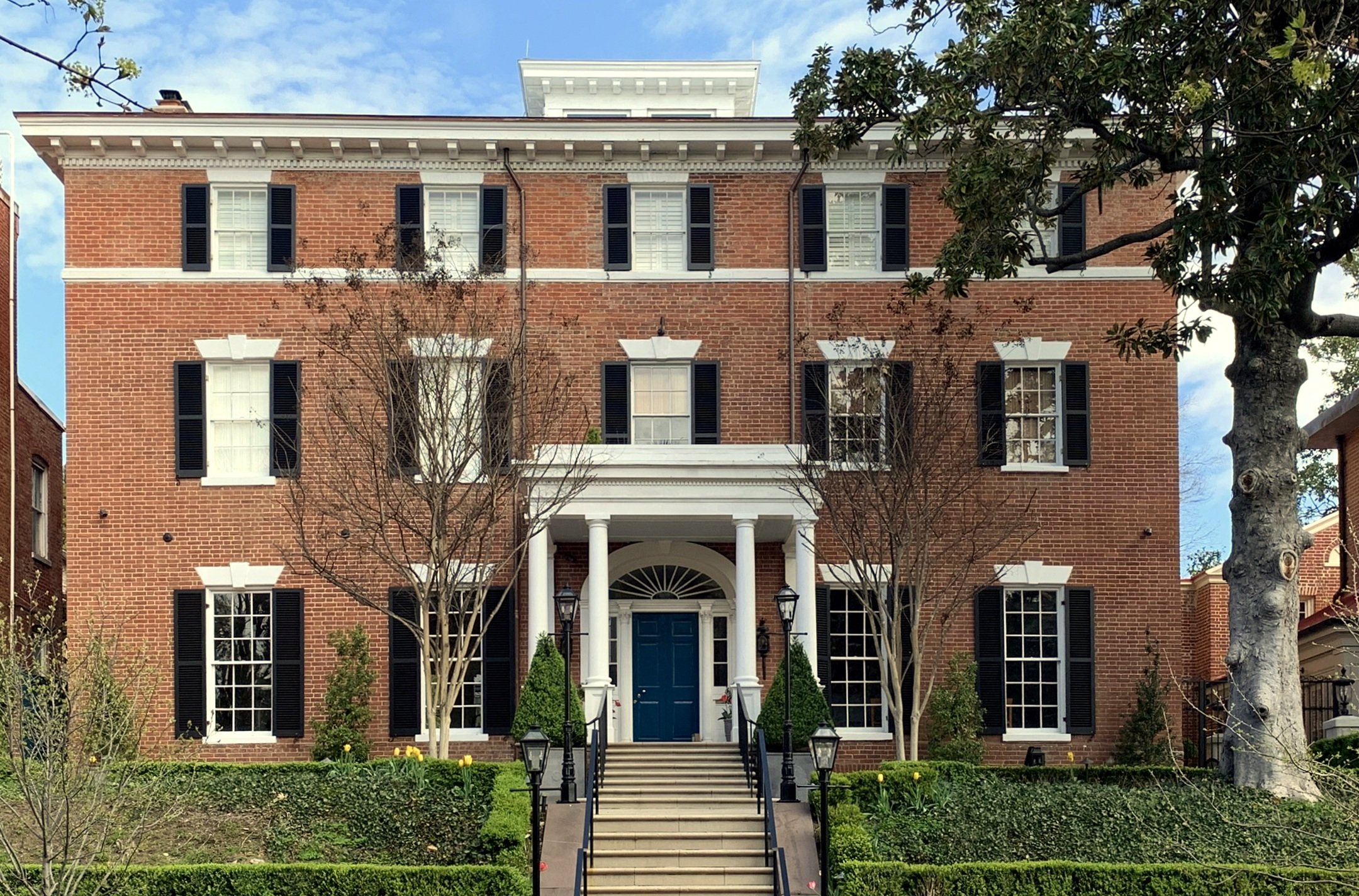
Campbell's childhood home in Washington, D.C.

== Career ==
Campbell began her career performing stand-up comedy after graduating from high school. She has appeared on shows at The Stand, Jimmy Kimmel's Comedy Club, New York Comedy Club, and Broadway Comedy Club.

Campbell is a TikToker and previously was employed by Apple Inc. as a hardware engineer. A TikTok video she made about how to deal with a stolen iPhone went viral, receiving over five million views within a twenty-four-hour period. Campbell claimed Apple threatened to fire her after she made the video. She was later fired from Apple over an issue regarding medical leave during the COVID-19 pandemic.

She was featured in The New York Times, New York Post, Fortune, and Unilad.

Campbell was a member of the band the Mississippi Medicals, along with Laura Jane Grace, Matt Patton, and Mikey Erg. They released their first two singles, "All Fucked Out" and "Karma's Coming Close", in June and July 2024, respectively. On July 30, 2024, they announced their upcoming six-track EP titled "Give an Inch", which was released on September 6, 2024. She was also a member of the band Laura Jane Grace in the Trauma Tropes. She was a co-writer on the band's album Adventure Club.

In late-2024, Campbell founded her publication and website, GRLCHLD, and began self-publishing zines and personal essays through this. Around this time, Campbell also began printing and distributing physical copies of GRLCHLD.

In 2025, after parting ways from her previous musical projects, Campbell announced a solo musical project, under which she goes by "GIRLCHILD," and has shared she is releasing music December 2026.

== Personal life ==
Campbell married American rock musician Laura Jane Grace in Las Vegas on December 18, 2023, after having met the month before. On July 17, 2025, following allegations of emotional and verbal abuse shared by Campbell on social media expressing that she felt "unsafe," Grace moved out of their shared Chicago home.
