= Matthew M. Fox =

American film executive

- Born: February 4, 1911; Racine, Wisconsin, U.S.
- Died: June 2, 1964 (aged 53); New York City, New York, U.S.
- Resting place: Racine, Wisconsin, U.S.
- Occupation: Businessman
- Spouse: Yolande Betbeze (1954–1964; his death)
- Children: Yolande Dolly Fox
- Relatives: Paris Campbell Grace (granddaughter)

Matthew M. Fox (February 4, 1911 – June 2, 1964) was an American film and television executive.

== Early life ==
Fox was born on February 4, 1911, in Racine, Wisconsin. In his youth, he worked as an usher and doorman at the Rialto Theater in Racine.

== Career ==
Fox began working at the age of 8 for the Rialto Theater in Racine, WI. While attending Lincoln High School in Milwaukee, at the age of 15, he was a booking agent for Tiffany Stahl and later became head usher and assistant manager of the Riverside Theater.

In 1932 he moved to Long Island, NY, where he managed a movie house. He was eventually hired by movie mogul George Skouras as an assistant.

In 1938, after his brother-in-law Nate Blumberg became head of Universal Pictures, Fox relocated to Hollywood, California and was appointed the executive vice president of Universal Pictures, and board chairman of its subsidiary United World Films. In 1942, following the attack on Pearl Harbor, he left his role as vice president of Universal Pictures to serve the United States government. Fox joined the War Production Planning Commission and took charge of collecting scrap metal, old tires, and other discarded materials needed by defense industries. Fox later enlisted in the United States Army as a private and, by the end of World War II, was promoted to the rank of major.

Fox returned to Universal in his former capacities. In 1948, Fox formed the international trade organization American-Indonesian Corporation. His company was terminated by the Indonesian government the following year, after Dutch rule ended, and he received a settlement of $550,000. Because of his role in Indonesian trade, he was nicknamed the "economic godfather of Indonesia", but the increasing pressure of his Indonesian activities forced him to resign from both Universal and United World in December 1950.

== Entrepreneur ==
By this time Matty Fox had cultivated a reputation as a brilliant, trail-blazing executive, noted for swinging many big-business deals. He pioneered syndicating films to television; his Motion Pictures for Television (MPTV) company was very successful, bringing hundreds of 1930s/1940s features to local TV stations. In 1955 Fox sold his MPTV interests to Reub Kaufman's Guild Films, another prominent syndicator, in preparation of Fox's greatest coup.

In December 1955, in a bold move that stunned the entertainment industry, Matty Fox negotiated the purchase of the entire film backlog of RKO Radio Pictures, comprising 740 feature films and more than 1,000 short subjects. As president of C & C Television Corp., Fox made the RKO library available to local TV stations, selling 16mm film prints to the stations and granting them the right to broadcast the films in perpetuity. Some stations continue to show C & C prints today. The "C & C" stood for Cantrell and Cochrane, soft-drink manufacturers intent on advertising its C & C Cola during broadcasts of the C & C films.

Fox also introduced pay television in the United States, via his Skiatron of America company. Fox's plan was to make major-league baseball games available to home viewers on a subscription basis. In 1959 the federal Securities and Exchange Commission suspended Skiatron's stock-trading privileges, after concluding that its operations were muddled and confused. Undaunted, Fox revived his plans for pay-TV baseball in 1963 with a new firm, Subscription Television, Inc. Film Bulletin commented at the time, "Matty Fox is a hard man to keep down. [His] dream of harnessing the airwaves has not been suppressed, and he is back again with a new pay-TV plan [with two baseball teams] to have 20,000 paying customers in each city by July 1, 1964." Fox would not live to see his latest enterprise come to fruition.

== Personal life ==
In 1954, Fox married Yolande Betbeze, an opera singer and Miss America 1951. They had one daughter, Yolande "Dolly" Fox.

On June 2, 1964, Fox died from a heart attack at his Park Avenue home. A funeral service was held on June 3, 1964, at Riverside Memorial Chapel on the Upper West Side. A graveside service conducted by Rabbi Hyman Cohen of Beth-Israel Sinai Temple was held on June 4, 1964, in Racine.
