= Iran hostage crisis negotiations =

Algeria-mediated Iran–United States talks (1980–1981)

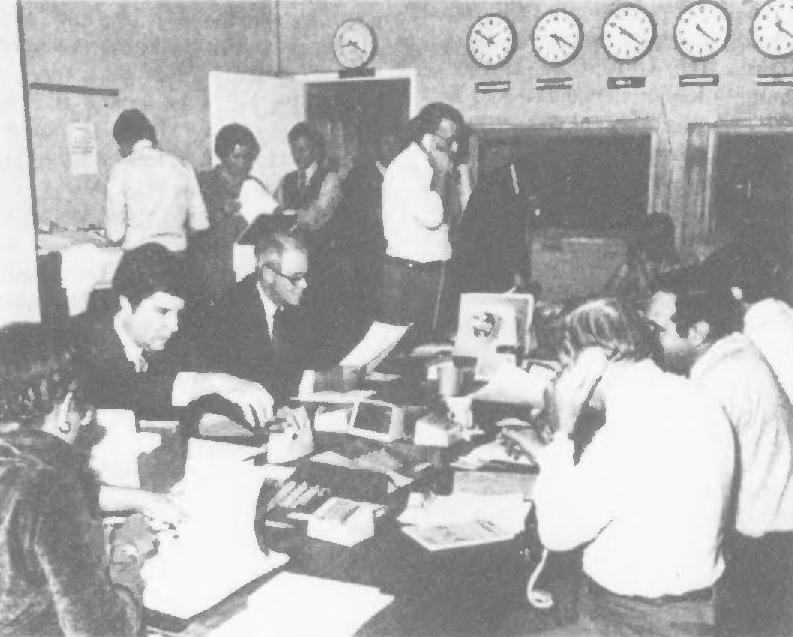
Secretary of State Cyrus Vance working to free hostages in the State Department Operations Center, 1979

Throughout 1980, Iran and the United States engaged in negotiations to end the Iran hostage crisis, which began in November 1979. Iranian demands most notably included the United States' extradition of Iran's former king Mohammad Reza Pahlavi, who had been overthrown by the Iranian Revolution before being granted asylum by the Carter administration for cancer treatment, though he would later succumb to his illness in Egypt; Pahlavi's asylum in the United States was cited as the reason for the siege of the country's embassy in Tehran, where 66 Americans were taken hostage, with 52 of them being held for the duration of the crisis. Algeria took on the role of mediating between Iran and the United States during these negotiations, initially dispatching ambassadors to simply relay each side's messages to the other, but eventually becoming more actively involved in resolution efforts. In January 1981, both countries' acceptance of proposals by the Algerian mediation team resulted in the signing of the Algiers Accords, by which Iran released all of the hostages. A detailed account of the hostage crisis and the Algiers Accords is found in American Hostages In Iran: The Conduct of a Crisis [Yale 1985], put together by the American think tank Council on Foreign Relations.

== Negotiations ==
=== First attempts ===
The first attempt to negotiate a release of the hostages involved Hector Villalon and Christian Bourget, representing Iranian Foreign Minister Sadegh Ghotbzadeh. They "delivered a formal request to Panama for the extradition of the Shah", which was "a pretext to cover secret negotiations to free the American hostages". This happened as the Soviets invaded Iran's neighbor Afghanistan, an event America hoped would "illustrate the threat" of its superpower neighbor and need for better relations with the Soviet's enemy, America. Ghotbzadeh himself was eager to end the hostage-taking before the January election cycle in Iran, as "moderates" were being eliminated from the Iranian government one by one after being exposed by the student hostage-takers as "traitors" and "spies" for having met at some time with an American official.

Specifically, both Ghotzbaeh and the Ayatollah were worried about the potential political ramifications of the hostage crisis on the upcoming United Nations Security Council vote on the imposition of sanctions on the new regime, which could have posed a threat to the legitimacy of the Islamic Republic (as predicted by Ghotzbadeh, ten of the fifteen Security Council members voted for the sanctions; although the measure was vetoed by the Soviet Union, the United States ended up imposing sanctions of its own). Ghotzbadeh advocated the use of the "New Panamanian Channel" through which a process of legal negotiations and the initiation of the extradition of the Shah from Panama back to Iran would facilitate the release of the hostages. Both he and the Ayatollah adhered to the "principle of extradition" which entailed the right of Iran to seek the legal extradition of the Shah. The Panamanian Government, for its part, largely believed the Hostage Crisis to be an "American Plot" designed to engineer presidential candidate Ronald Reagan's victory.

Carter aide Hamilton Jordan flew to Paris "wearing a disguise—a wig, false mustache and glasses" to meet with Ghotbzadeh. After "weeks of negotiation with...emissaries,...a complex multi-stepped plan" was "hammered out" that included the establishment of an international commission to study America's role in Iran. Rumours of a release leaked to the American public and on February 19, 1980, the American Vice President Walter Mondale told an interviewer that "the crisis was nearing an end." The plan fell apart however after Ayatollah Khomeini gave a speech praising the embassy occupation as "a crushing blow to the world-devouring USA" and announced the fate of the hostages would be decided by the Iranian parliament, the Majlis, which had yet to be seated or even elected. When the six-man international UN commission came to Iran they were not allowed to see the hostages, and President Abolhassan Banisadr retreated from his criticism of the hostage-takers, praising them as "young patriots".

The next unsuccessful attempt occurred in April, which entailed the imposition of sanctions and the deployment of US military forces in Iran as a rescue operation. The failure of three helicopters meant the mission was aborted, resulting in the death of eight servicemen during the attempted escape (the bodies would be recovered by the Iranian government, displayed in Tehran, and ultimately returned to the United States). The failure of the mission resulted in the resignation of Cyrus Vance and president being forced to publicly promise not to "impose additional sanctions" on Iran. In exchange, custody of the hostages would be transferred to the government of Iran, who would be released after a short period—the Iranian president and foreign minister both opposing the continued holding of the hostages. To the American's surprise and disappointment, after Carter made his promise, President Banisadr added additional demands: official American approval of the resolution of the hostage question by Iran's parliament (which would leave the hostages in Tehran for another month or two), and a promise by Carter to refrain from making "hostile statements". Carter also agreed to these demands, but again Khomeini vetoed the plan. At this point, President Banisadr announced he was "washing his hands of the hostage mess". The next day President Carter broke relations with the Islamic Republic, expelled Iranian diplomats and looked towards the military option.

=== July ===
In early July, the Iranians released hostage Richard Queen, who had developed multiple sclerosis. In the States, constant media coverage—yellow ribbons, footage of chanting Iranian mobs, even a whole new television news program, ABC's Nightline—provided a dispiriting backdrop to the presidential election season. As Carter advisor and biographer, Peter Bourne put it, "Because people felt that Carter had not been tough enough in foreign policy, this kind of symbolized for them that some bunch of students could seize American diplomatic officials and hold them prisoner and thumb their nose at the United States." The death of the Shah on July 27 and the invasion of Iran by Iraq in September 1980 may have made Iran more receptive to the idea of resolving the hostage crisis. There was little more advantage to be gained from further anti-American, anti-Shah propaganda, and the ongoing sanctions were making it harder to straighten out an already chaotic economy.

Talks that ultimately succeeded in bringing a release began secretly in September 1980 and were initiated by Sadegh Tabatabai, a brother-in-law of Khomeini's son Ahmad and "a mid-level official" in the former-provisional revolutionary government. On September 12, 1980, Khomeini announced four conditions for release of the hostages: one, return of the Shah's wealth to Iran; two, cancellation of US claims against Iran; three, unfreezing Iran's assets in the United States; four, US guarantees of non-interference in Iran's internal affairs. The Majlis approved these conditions on November 2, 1980––two days before the US presidential election. On November 3, the US received a diplomatic note from Algeria confirming that Iran was ready to negotiate on the basis of the four points through the good offices of the Algerian government. The hostage negotiations proceeded to conclusion via mediation by Algeria. There were no direct contacts between Washington and Tehran.

=== November ===
Ronald Reagan defeated Jimmy Carter in the November 1980 presidential election with pressure being added to the negotiations by the President-Elect's talk of not paying "ransom for people who have been kidnapped by barbarians", and a New Year's Day threat from Radio Tehran that if the United States did not accept Iran's demands the hostages would be tried as spies and executed if found guilty. In the final stages of the negotiations in Algiers, the chief Algerian mediator was the Foreign Affairs Minister Mohammed Benyahia who interacted primarily with Deputy Secretary of State Warren Christopher from the US side. Former Algerian ambassador to the US Abdulkarim Ghuraib also participated in the negotiations. Much of the money involved was being held in overseas branches of twelve American banks, so Carter, his cabinet, and staff were constantly on the phone to London, Istanbul, Bonn, and other world capitals to work out the financial details.

The negotiations resulted in the "Algiers Accords" of January 19, 1981. The package included two declarations issued by the government of the Democratic and Popular Republic of Algeria to the government of the Islamic Republic of Iran and the government of the United States of America and three supporting technical arrangements. The Accords were initialed by Warren Christopher in Algiers, formally accepted by President Carter and entered into force as an international agreement between Iran and the United States all on the same day, January 19, 1981. The Algiers Accords called for Iran's immediate freeing of the hostages, the unfreezing of $7.9 billion of Iranian assets, termination of lawsuits Iran faced in America, and a pledge by the United States that "it is and from now on will be the policy of the United States not to intervene, directly or indirectly, politically or militarily, in Iran's internal affairs". The Accords also created the Iran–United States Claims Tribunal, and Iran deposited $1 billion in an escrow account to satisfy claims adjudicated by the tribunal in favor of American claimants. The Tribunal received approximately 4,700 private US claims. The tribunal has ordered payments by Iran to US nationals totaling over $2.5 billion. Almost all private claims have now been resolved, but several intergovernmental claims are still before the tribunal.

== Release ==
A series of crises slowed down the process. Lloyd Cutler, White House counsel, told the president there was a delay in the transfer of assets; the Federal Reserve Bank of New York did not have its part of the money, so funds were shifted among the reserve banks. Then, the telex codes required to transfer Iranian assets needed to trigger release of the hostages were not properly transmitted. Billions were involved and banks, including the NY Federal Reserve Bank, hesitated to proceed without proper documentation. President Carter's personal intervention was required to move the funds.

Another difficulty concerned the time difference between Washington and Tehran. Because of the war with Iraq, the Iranian officials had blackouts of airport lights. This meant that once it got dark in Iran (about 9:30 a.m. Washington time), even if the deal had been sealed, the Algerian pilots would not take off until dawn. Thus, if the departure time passed, everyone understood that it would be another eight to ten hours before anything could happen. In the small hours of January 19, 1981, word came to Carter that the planes were on the runway in Tehran, and the hostages had been taken to the vicinity of the airport. At 4:44 a.m. Carter went to the press briefing room to announce that with the help of Algeria the United States and Iran had reached an agreement, but was halted because the Algerian negotiator sent word that the Iranian bank officials did not agree with the terms of accountability in the banking agreements. The staff soon understood that Carter's trip to Germany to greet hostages would not occur until after the inauguration.

The hostages were released on January 20, 1981, the day President Carter's term ended. While Carter had an "obsession" with finishing the matter before stepping down, the hostage-takers are thought to have wanted the release delayed as punishment for his perceived support for the Shah. Iranians insisted on payment in gold rather than US dollars so the US government transferred 50 tonnes of gold to Iran while simultaneously taking ownership of an equivalent quantity of Iranian gold that had been frozen at the New York Federal Reserve Bank. At 6:35 a.m., Deputy Secretary of State Warren Christopher informed Carter that, "All escrows were signed at 6:18. The Bank of England has certified that they hold $7.98 billion, the correct amount". At 8:04 a.m., Algeria confirmed that the bank certification was complete, and the Algerians were notifying Iran. At 9:45 a.m., Christopher told Carter take-off would be by noon, but, as a security measure, the Iranian officials did not want the word released until the hostages were out of Iranian airspace. President Carter said the United States would comply.

== See also ==
- 1980 October Surprise theory
- The role of Algeria in the resolution of the American hostages crisis
- Iran hostage crisis
