= Zonder Kennedy =

American singer-songwriter

- Born: Alexander Kennedy; September 2, 1955 (age 70); Princeton, New Jersey, U.S.
- Genres: Blues, rock
- Occupations: Guitarist, singer, songwriter
- Instrument: Electric guitar
- Years active: 1970s–present
- Labels: Arista; Geffen; Elektra; Warner Bros. Soul Station

Zonder Kennedy (born Alexander Kennedy, September 2, 1955, Princeton, New Jersey) is an American blues and rock guitarist, singer and songwriter.

== Early career ==
Kennedy's musical career began during his teenage years in Princeton, New Jersey. The first record he bought with his own money was Buddy Guy’s A Man And The Blues. He left home and school at age 16 and wound up in the San Francisco Bay Area. He moved to Boston in the late 1970s, and then to western Massachusetts. There he formed a band called Reliable Music with Mark Grandfield, and his childhood friend Tommy Myers. After that band folded, Kennedy and Myers joined John Clark's Bailey Brothers Blues Band. They spent the next few years constantly touring the boogie band circuit from Washington, D.C. to Canada, often sleeping in Kennedy's car.

The Bailey Brothers Blues Band evolved into a band called Cash with additional members Jerry Ellis and drummer William "Benji" Benjamin, veteran of the band Fat. In 1979, the band and their manager Pat Irwin were in an elevator on their way to meet with Arista Records to discuss a contract. Irwin noticed in Billboard that there was already a band named Cash, so the band hastily agreed to rename themselves The Elevators. Their sound was often compared to The Cars, as both bands had songs with many hooks, prominent keyboards, and other New Wave/Power Pop elements. Gigs in New York and elsewhere followed, but just as the band was getting a degree of national attention, Kennedy was seriously injured in a car accident. After a few months of recuperation, he re-joined the band, and shortly after the band was signed to Arista Records.

In late 1979, they recorded their only album Frontline at Sound City in Van Nuys California, with Earle Mankey producing. Despite strong songs like "Stickball Kids" and "Girlfriend’s Girlfriend", the album did not take off, and they were subsequently dropped by Arista. On December 31, 1979, Kennedy moved to New York City, and continued gigging with various bands at CBGB and other New York clubs.

== Collaboration with John Campbell ==
Kennedy met blues guitarist and singer John Campbell while both were living in Manhattan in the late 1980s. They met at Matt Umanov Guitars in Greenwich Village. They soon discovered a mutual respect for the blues, and a friendship was formed. Kennedy joined Campbell and his Austin–based rhythm section, Jimmy Pettit and Davis McLarty. They subsequently toured the world for three years, playing as many as 250 dates annually and sharing stages with a host of blues and roots musicians including Buddy Guy, Eric Clapton, Bob Dylan, The Allman Brothers, The Black Crowes, and Dr. John. Kennedy co-wrote six songs with Campbell, three of which were recorded on the album Howlin’ Mercy (1993).

Campbell suffered heart failure and died at his home in Manhattan on June 13, 1993. He was 41 years old. After Campbell's death Kennedy moved to Austin, where he joined Doyle Bramhall’s group. They toured with Jimmie Vaughan and Robert Cray among others. In 2001, he co-founded The Weeds, with Lata Chettri, Bruce Martin, Neil Thomas, Mike Levesque and Andy Heermans.

In 2002, he joined up with Loup Garou, and played on their album Dobbs Ferry.

In 2005 Kennedy was gigging and recording with a blues-rock band named Midnight Eleven, with fellow members Mark Grandfield, Danny Korchmar, and Joe Bonadio.

== The Scoville Junkies ==
Kennedy's current band, The Scoville Junkies, includes bassist Mike Dunn and drummer Bruce Martin. Both have played extensively with various bands, including the Levon Helm Band, and The Tom Tom Club. Their eponymous record, (released in 2011) included the song “Dr. Midnight” which is a tribute to the late John Campbell.

“I had a dream where John came to me and told me he was not dead, but was hiding out somewhere,” Kennedy has explained. “Hence the lines, ‘Hey man, I never really left/ I’m just holding down the graveyard shift’ in the first verse. The weird thing about it is, Jimmy Pettit, who played bass with me in John's band, had the same dream.”
