= John Allen Campbell (disambiguation) =

John Allen Campbell may refer to:

- John Allen Campbell, a political figure and army general
- John Campbell (blues guitarist), a guitarist and musician
