= Georgetown Female Seminary =

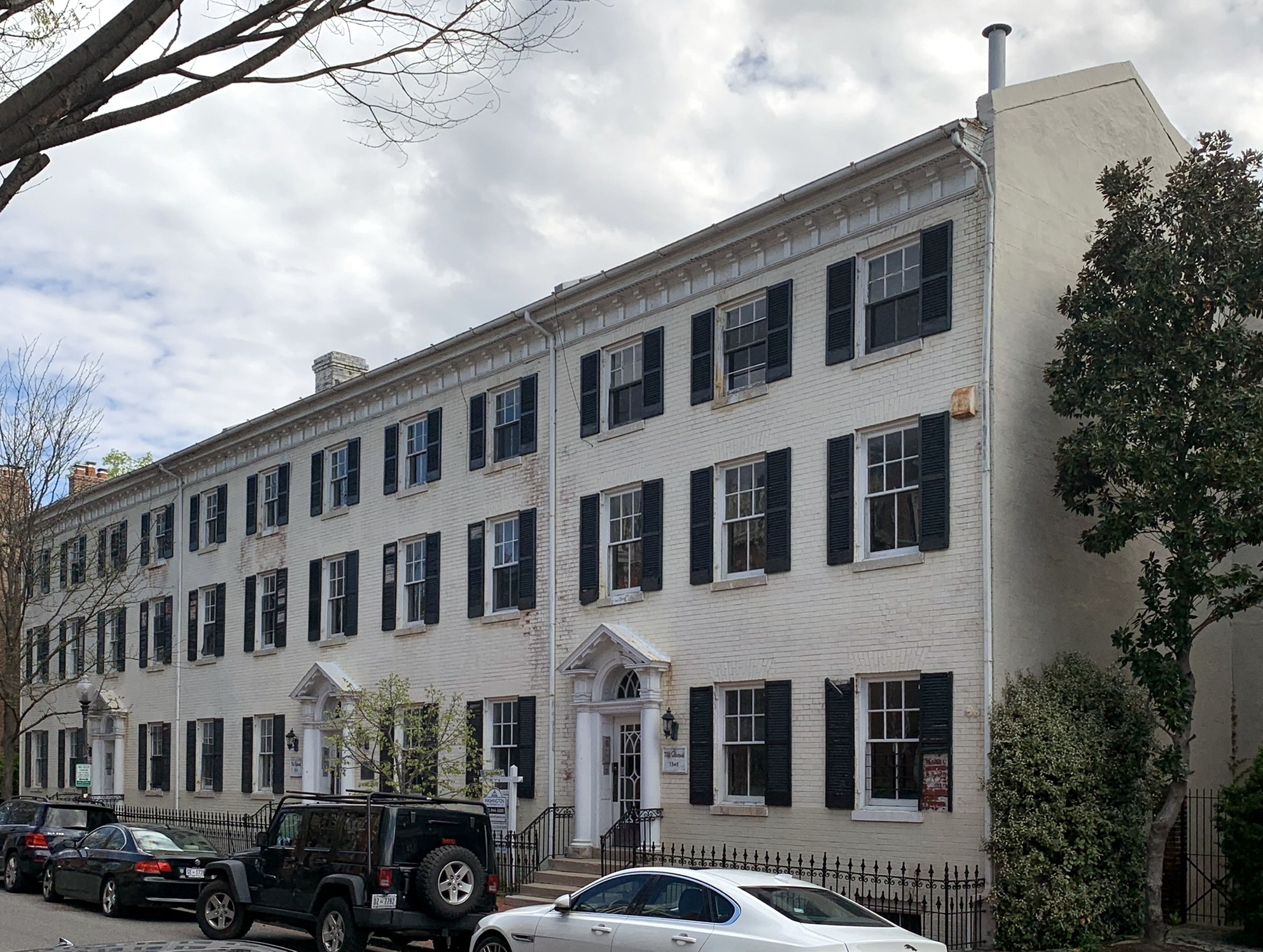
Miss English's Seminary for Young Ladies was located in this building from 1820 to 1861.

Georgetown Female Seminary (later, Waverley Seminary) was an American school for young women located in Georgetown, Washington, D.C.

== Miss English's Female Seminary ==
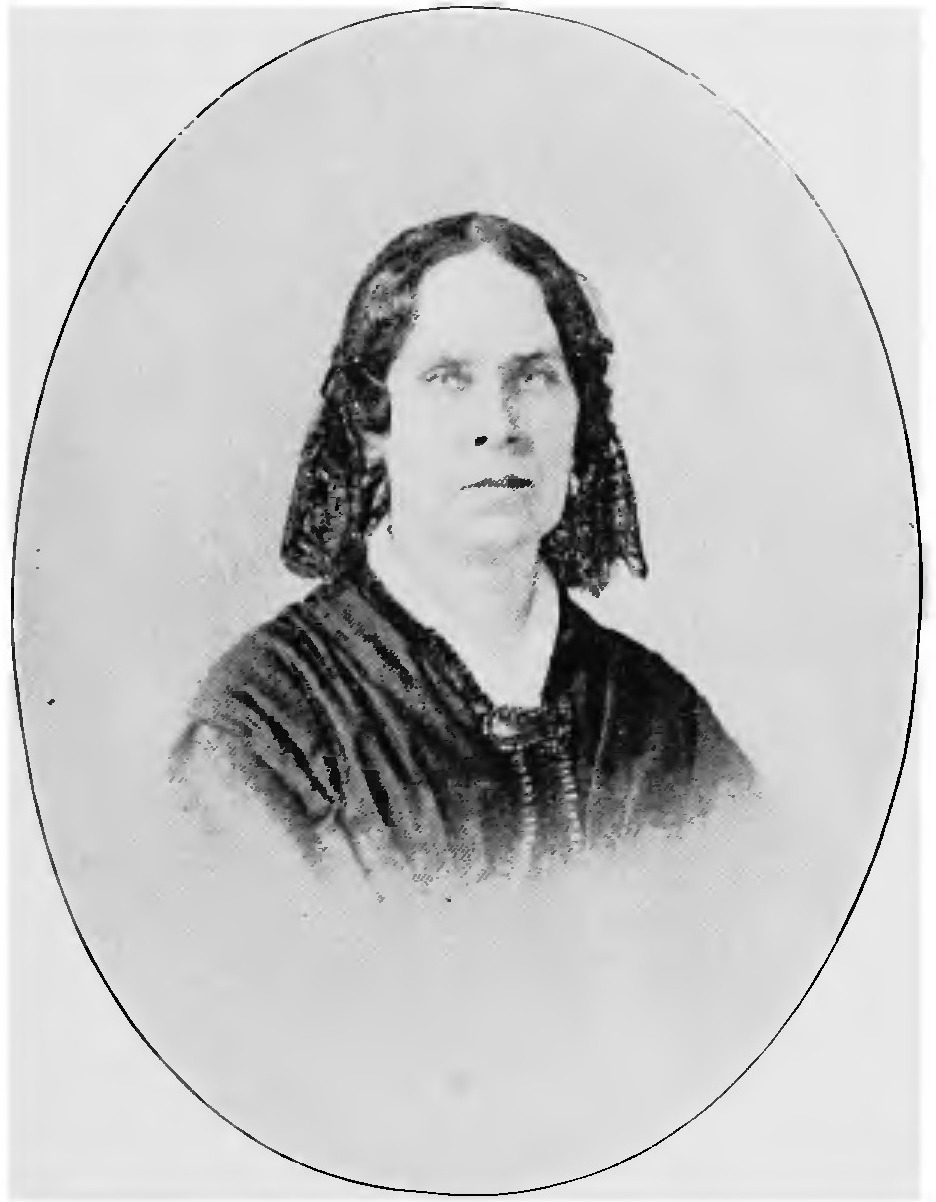
Lydia S. English

Lydia S. English founded the school in 1826 when she was only sixteen years old. English's father had recently remarried and she founded the school as a way to live apart from her new stepmother. English received no support from her family for her new endeavor. The first class included just three students: Jane Wann, Eliza Henderson, and Miss Perry.

The school quickly expanded to serve the daughters of Washington politicians. In 1835, the school had 130 pupils. Under English, the curriculum included botany. Noted writer Caroline Healey Dall taught at the school in the Fall and Winter of 1842.

According to the papers of Andrew Johnson, it cost $33.81 for Martha Johnson Patterson to attend Miss English's Female Seminary between December 2, 1844 and February 12, 1845. Lodging and laundry service brought the total to $39.99.

The seminary was three floors high and contained 19 bedrooms, a library, several parlors, and porches on the wings. It even had running hot water. The Union Army confiscated the seminary in 1861 during the Civil War and turned it into a hospital for officers. It is believed that Mary Edwards Walker, the first woman to win the Medal of Honor, served here.

English was a secessionist. Enslaved people helped run the school under English. While the school was being used as a hospital, English moved out of sight around the corner to 2812 N Street.

Lydia S. English died on February 24, 1866. She is buried at Oak Hill Cemetery in Washington, D.C.

== Georgetown Female Seminary ==
On September 12, 1868, Mary E. Bibb and Miss S. A. Lipscomb organized the Georgetown Female Seminary. Bib and Lipscomb were sisters from a family of teachers. Their brother, Andrew Adgate Lipscomb, was chancellor of the University of Georgia for fifteen years. Both women were graduates of Lydia S. English's school.

The school increased in thrived under the new management and continued to educate the daughters of prominent families. After three years, Bibb retired. Lipscomb ran the school after 1871.

In The Yearbook of Education for 1879 the Georgetown Female Seminary is described as "A Select Boarding and Day School for Young Ladies and Children." The school began with a kindergarten department and ended with a collegiate department. Courses offered included modern languages, music, drawing and bookkeeping. The principals were Mrs, Zelia D. Butcher and Miss Mary C. Douglas. The school was located at 1023 12th St NW, Washington DC.

== Waverly Seminary ==
After 10 years, Lipscomb renamed the school as Waverley Seminary and relocated to a more central area of Washington DC. Dolly Blount Lamar attended around 1878 and she described it as a "combination preparatory and finishing school for young ladies from the South."

According to The Yearbook of Education for 1879, French conversation was a specialty of the school. At this point, Waverly Seminary was located at 1412 H St NW, Washington DC.

== Alumni ==
- Jessie Benton Frémont (writer and political activist, daughter of Senator Thomas Hart Benton)
- Martha Johnson Patterson (daughter of President Andrew Johnson)

== See also ==
- Newton D. Baker House
