= Yolande Fox =

American singer, model, activist (1928–2016)

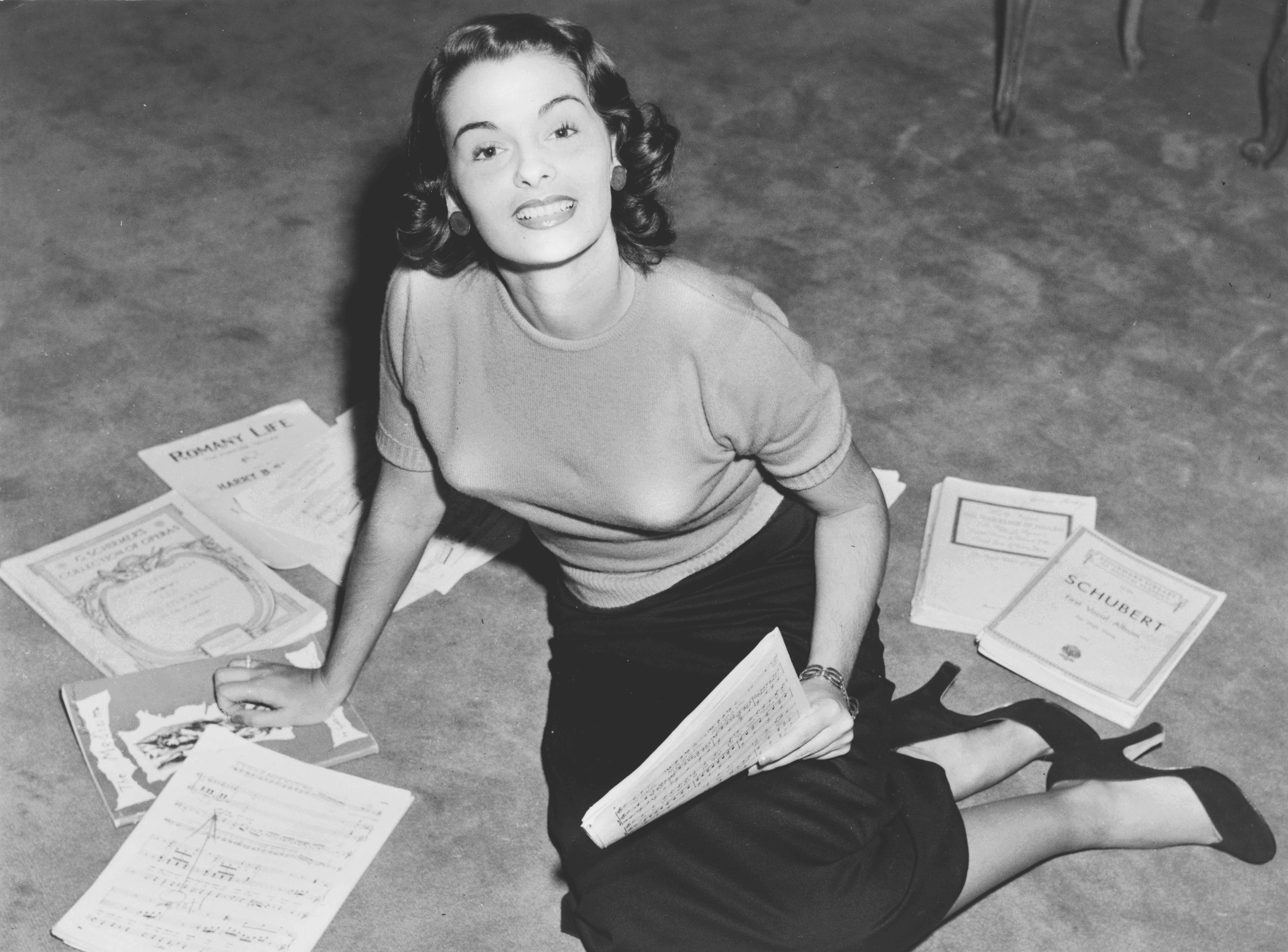
- Betbeze in 1950
- Born: Yolande Margaret Betbeze; November 28, 1928; Mobile, Alabama, U.S.
- Died: February 22, 2016 (aged 87); Washington, D.C., U.S.
- Education: New School for Social Research
- Occupations: Opera singer, activist
- Title: Miss America 1951
- Predecessor: Jacque Mercer
- Successor: Colleen Kay Hutchins
- Spouse: Matthew M. Fox (m. 1954; died 1964)
- Partner: Cherif Guellal
- Children: Yolande Fox Campbell
- Relatives: Paris Campbell Grace (granddaughter)

Yolande Margaret Betbeze Fox (November 28, 1928 – February 22, 2016) was an American singer, feminist activist, and beauty pageant titleholder who was crowned Miss America 1951.

== Early life ==
Betbeze was born on November 28, 1928, in Mobile, Alabama, to William, a butcher, and Ethel Betbeze. Betbeze was raised in a Catholic family of French Basque descent, and she attended convent schools.

== Career ==
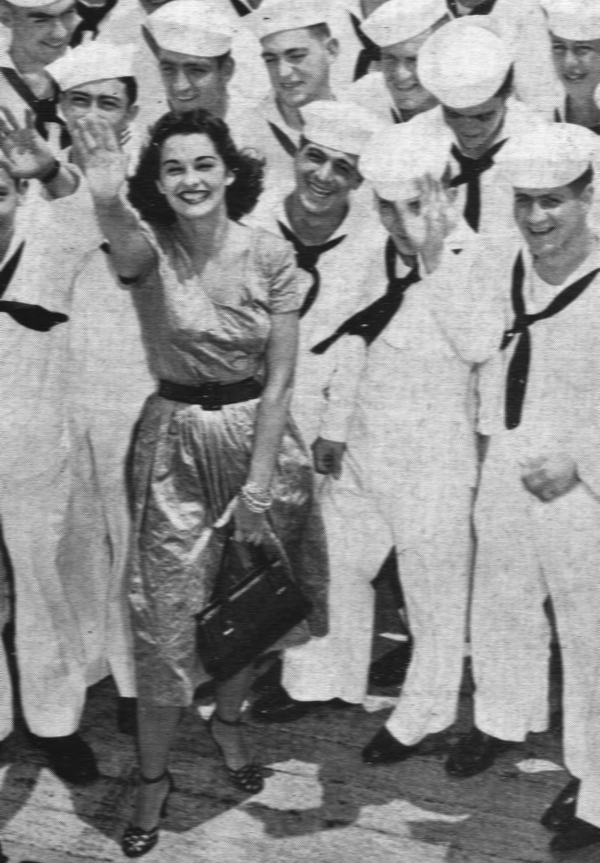
Aboard the USS Monterey in 1951

She captured her first crown in 1949 when she won Mobile's "Miss Torch" pageant. In 1950, Fox (then Betbeze) entered Miss Alabama for the scholarship opportunities the pageant presented. As Miss Alabama, she traveled to Atlantic City, New Jersey, to compete in the Miss America 1951 pageant. Having been educated in a convent school, she was reluctant to pose in a swimsuit and refused to do so after she won Miss America. That led the swimsuit company, Catalina, to withdraw their sponsorship of Miss America and eventually brought about the creation of the rival Miss USA pageant.

Fox's Miss America title, although won in 1950, was for 1951 and is the first Miss America title to be "postdated" in this manner. Due to the change, there was no Miss America 1950. The Miss America Organization has claimed that Fox's (then Betbeze's) actions were pivotal in directing pageant progress towards recognizing intellect, values, and leadership abilities, rather than focusing on beauty alone. From then on, the pageant concentrated more on scholarship than beauty.

Fox was active in the feminist movement. After her one-year reign as Miss America, she was active in the NAACP, CORE (Congress of Racial Equality), and SANE (The Committee for a SANE Nuclear Policy); and studied philosophy at the New School for Social Research in New York City.

Fox was an opera singer and did gain a reputation in that area. She continued to sing, appearing with the Mobile Opera Guild (now the Mobile Opera), and helped found an off-Broadway theater.

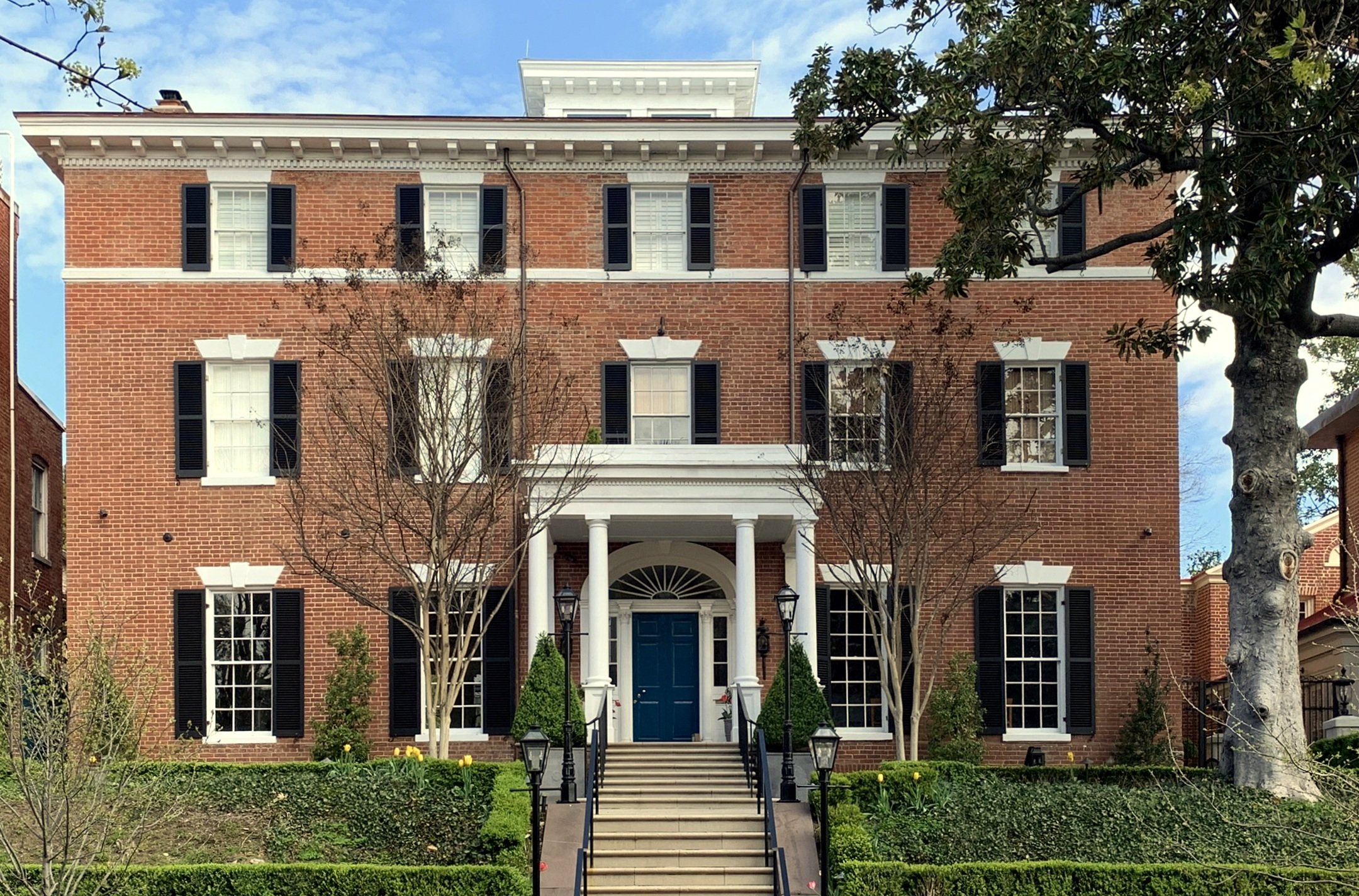
Fox's home in Washington, D.C.

== Personal life ==
She married movie magnate Matthew M. Fox, the former vice president of Universal Pictures, in 1954. They had one daughter, Yolande "Dolly" Fox Campbell. Her husband died of a heart attack in 1964, after 10 years of marriage.

After her husband's death, she moved to Georgetown, Washington, D.C., purchasing the Newton D. Baker House from Michael Whitney Straight and his then wife Nina Gore Auchincloss. The home had previously been the residence of Jacqueline Kennedy after the assassination of John F. Kennedy in 1963.

Fox had a relationship with Cherif Guellal, with whom she raised her grandchild, Yolande Paris Campbell, until Guellal's death in 2009.

In the early 1990s, Yolande Fox was contacted by the writer Philip Roth, who was researching the Miss America beauty pageant for his novel American Pastoral. Roth studied Fox's scrapbooks and interviewed her about the culture surrounding the pageant in the late 1940s; he later said: "She was very smart, very funny....She just opened up whole ideas for me that I couldn't have had on my own."

Fox died on February 22, 2016, in Washington, D.C. of lung cancer.

Fox's granddaughter Paris Campbell Grace revealed in a video that Yolande sent them to a facility that was "a torture center for children" when they were a teen. They stated they were abused by staff members multiple times while they were there and that they couldn't contact their mother or grandmother. It's implied that Paris was sent away due to being a lesbian.

Awards and achievements
| Preceded by Jacque Mercer | Miss America; 1951 | Succeeded by Colleen Kay Hutchins |
| Preceded by Freida Roser | Miss Alabama; 1950 | Succeeded by Jeanne Moody |
