= Newton D. Baker House =

Historic house in Washington, D.C., United States

- U.S. National Register of Historic Places
- U.S. National Historic Landmark
- D.C. Inventory of Historic Sites
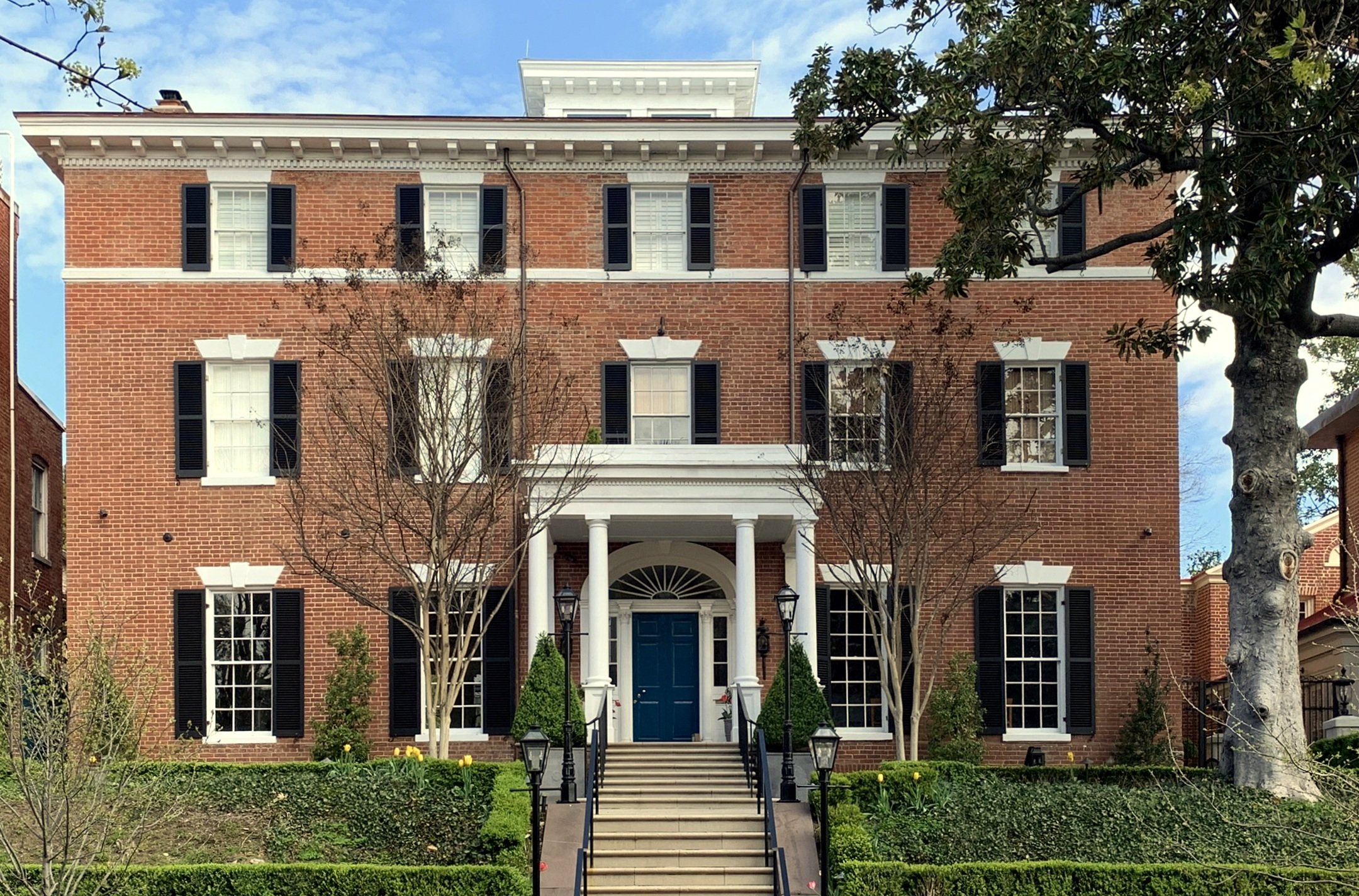
- Newton D. Baker House in 2022

- Location within Washington, D.C.
- Location: 3017 N St., NW, Washington, D.C.
- Coordinates: 38°54′25″N 77°3′37″W
- Built: 1794
- Architect: Thomas Beall
- NRHP reference No.: 76002126

Significant dates
- Added to NRHP: December 8, 1976
- Designated NHL: December 8, 1976
- Designated DCIHS: November 8, 1964

Newton D. Baker House, also known as Jacqueline Kennedy House, is a historic house at 3017 N Street NW in Washington, D.C. Built in 1794, it was home of Newton D. Baker, who was Secretary of War, during 1916–1920, while "he presided over America's mass mobilization of men and material in World War I. After the assassination of President John F. Kennedy in 1963, Jacqueline Kennedy purchased the house and lived here for about a year.

It was declared a National Historic Landmark in 1976.

== History ==
The house was built in 1794 by Thomas Beall. During its early years, the house was situated on a large plot of land and was said to have had a servants wing attached to the east side. At that time N Street was known as Gay Street and was situated higher than today.

In 1796, John Laird, a wealthy merchant, lived in the house, and later Maj. George Peter, a War of 1812 commander and Maryland Congressman, purchased the house who lived there until 1827, when the same Laird bought the house for his son. In 1834, William Redin, the first auditor of the Circuit Court for the District of Columbia, purchased it.

In 1868, Redin's unmarried daughter inherited and sold the dwelling, which became the Georgetown Female Seminary. The Seminary had a student body of boarders and day students totaling 105. In approximately 1890, John H. Smoot bought the building and converted it back to a private residence again.

In 1915, Col. William E. Pattison French purchased the house, and began renting it to Newton D. Baker in 1916. When Baker returned to Cleveland in 1920, French either leased or lived in the house himself for more than two decades. During the World War II, the British military attache occupied the house and rented rooms to British officers.

After World War II, Vice Admiral Alan Kirk, later Ambassador to Belgium and to the Soviet Union, purchased the property. Three years later, Dr. E. H. Gushing bought the home along with his wife. They sold the attached servants' wing as a separate residence to Mr. and Mrs. Stanley Woodward who built a new front entrance and lived in the home. The Gushings updated the main house's electrical wiring and plumbing and removed some of the interior walls therefore enlarging the living room.

In 1954, James McMillan Gibson bought the dwelling, added a small rear wing, and installed an elevator and lived there with his wife.

Jacqueline Kennedy purchased the house and lived in it shortly after the assassination of her husband, President John F. Kennedy, in 1963. The Kennedy family lived here for about a year.

In 1965, Michael Whitney Straight purchased the home for $200,000 (equivalent to $2,076,000 in 2025), from Kennedy when she moved to New York City. While living in the home, Straight married his second wife, Nina G. Auchincloss Steers in 1974. Nina was the daughter of Nina Gore and Hugh D. Auchincloss. She was the half-sister of writer Gore Vidal and coincidentally, a stepsister of Jacqueline Kennedy Onassis. Straight and his wife spent $125,000 (equivalent to $816,000 in 2025) renovating the home and decided to move to Bethesda, Maryland in 1976 when he was vice chairman of the National Endowment for the Arts. Straight and his wife lived in the home until 1976.

In 1976, Yolande Betbeze Fox, the former Miss America 1951, bought the home from Straight. Fox lived in the home with her granddaughter, Paris Campbell, until her death in February 2016.

== Architectural details ==
The home is considered more representative of New England architecture than other contemporary Georgetown homes. The house has many architectural details including "a wide limestone stairway", "pink-painted lintels with keystones", "brick voussoirs", "Doric pilasters", and a "semi-elliptical fanlight".

== Resident timeline ==
- 1794-1796 - Thomas Beall
- 1796-? - John Laird
- ?-1827 - George Peter
- ?-1834 - John Laird's son
- 1834-1868 - William Redin
- 1868-1890 - Georgetown Female Seminary
- 1890-1915 - John H. Smoot
- 1915-1916 - Col. William E. Pattison French
- 1916-1920 - Newton D. Baker
- 1920-1941 - Col. William E. Pattison French
- 1941-1945 - British military attache
- 1945-1948 - Vice Admiral Alan Kirk
- 1948-1954 - Dr. E. H. Gushing (who sold the old servant's wing to Stanley Woodward)
- 1954-1964 - James McMillan Gibson
- 1964-1965 - Jacqueline Kennedy, Caroline Kennedy, John F. Kennedy Jr.
- 1965-1976 - Michael Whitney Straight and Nina G. Auchincloss Steers
- 1974-2016 - Yolande Bebeze Fox
- 2017–2021 - David W. Hudgens performed extensive renovations
- 2021-2022 - The Al Nahyans, UAE’s Royal Family
- 2023-Present - David W. Hudgens

== See also ==
- List of National Historic Landmarks in Washington, D.C.
