= Cherif Guellal =

Algerian diplomat

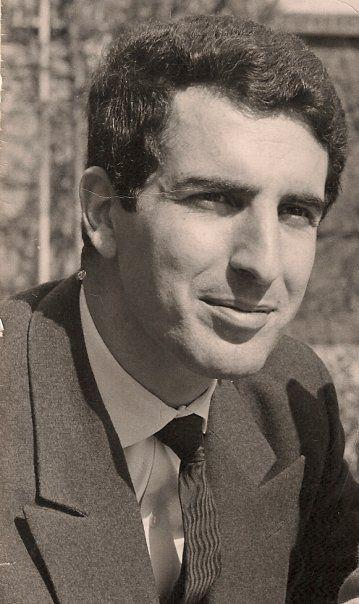
- Guellal in 1970

Algerian Ambassador to the United States
- In office 1963 – 1967
- Preceded by: Created
- Succeeded by: Abolished

Algerian Ambassador to Canada
- In office 1964 – 1967
- Preceded by: Created
- Succeeded by: Abolished

Personal details
- Born: August 19, 1932 Constantine, Algeria
- Died: April 7, 2009 (aged 76) Algiers, Algeria
- Domestic partner: Yolande Fox
- Education: Aix-en-Provence
- Occupation: Diplomat

Cherif Guellal (19 August 1932 – 7 April 2009) was an Algerian businessman and diplomat, who fought in the Algerian independence movement. He served as the Algerian Ambassador to the United States and the Algerian Ambassador to Canada.

== Biography ==
Cherif Guellal attended the university at Aix-en-Provence in southern France, and graduated in 1956. Taking the lead from his mother, who was a leader in the Algerian anti-French resistance movement, he joined the government in exile. He worked to build support for the movement, mainly from India.

He served as a key aide to the resistance leader Ahmed Ben Bella, who became the first president of post-colonial Algeria. He was sent to Washington, D.C., as the new country's first Ambassador to the United States. His primary role was to protect the Algerian oil interests and handle the independence of Algeria in the cold-war era. The US-Algeria relations were also tensed by the establishment of the Vietcongs' first mission outside of Vietnam, in Algeria. Cherif Guellal also had to handle Algeria's official ties with Cuba and the tension it generated within the US diplomatic corps. In a 1964 speech, he stated, "We wish to be masters in our own house and not junior partners of the great powers".

In May 1964, after Lyndon B. Johnson was named to the White House, his 12-room French chateau-style house (The Elms) was sold to the Algerian government and became the residence of Cherif Guellal. According to the writer Barbara Howar in her 1973 memoir Laughing All The Way, Guellal and Johnson both originated from oil-rich states (Texas for Johnson) and shared a similar mentality towards politics.

He outlasted his mentor, remaining in his post following the military coup that removed Ben Bella from power and installed Houari Boumedienne, the former National Liberation Front military chief, in his place.

In Washington, he successfully lobbied for the repeal of racially restrictive covenants on his ambassadorial residence, one impetus for the later, widespread repeal of such covenants.

When the 1967 Arab-Israeli war broke, Cherif Guellal's term ended. He remained a representative of Algeria's national oil company Sonatrach.

Ambassador Guellal died of leukemia in Algeria on April 7, 2009. He was buried at the El Alia Cemetery.

== Personal life ==
Guellal had a long-term relationship with Yolande Fox, who was Miss America 1951. Guellal and Fox led an active social life, frequenting academic meetings and circulating among Washington's social and intellectual elite. His social secretary was Sally Quinn. Until his death, he and Fox raised Fox's granddaughter, Yolande Paris Campbell, together.
