= The Grier School =

Grier School

Location
- 2522 Grier School Road; Tyrone, Pennsylvania 16686; United States; 40.6460°N 78.1939°W

Information
- Type: Independent college-preparatory boarding school
- Motto: Latin: Sana Mens in Corpore Sana (A Sound Mind in a Sound Body)
- Religious affiliation: Nonsectarian
- Established: 1853; 173 years ago
- Trust: Grier Foundation
- CEEB code: 394905
- NCES School ID: 01196715
- Director: Geoffrey Grier
- Head of school: Kara Lawler
- Faculty: 51.3 (on an FTE basis)
- Grades: 7-12
- Gender: All female
- Enrollment: 205 (2024–2025)
  - Grade 7: 9
  - Grade 8: 30
  - Grade 9: 42
  - Grade 10: 60
  - Grade 11: 51
  - Grade 12: 31
- Average class size: 9
- Student to teacher ratio: 5.8:1
- Language: English
- Hours in school day: 10
- Campus size: 320 acres (130 ha)
- Campus type: Town
- Colors: Green and Gold
- Accreditations: MSA, NAIS, NCGS, TABS
- Annual tuition: $64,500
- Revenue: $13.94 million
- Website: grier.org
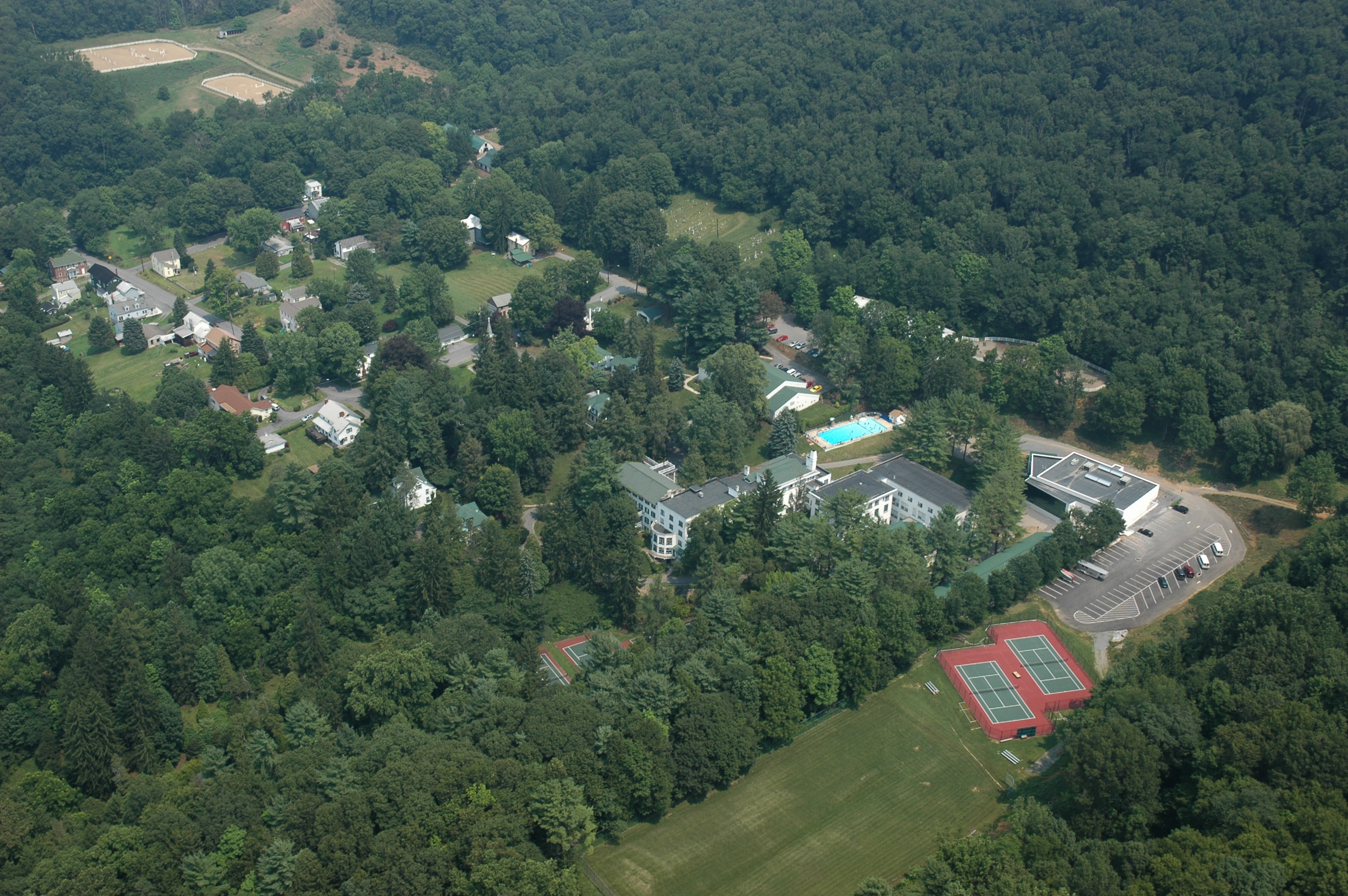

Grier School (also known as The Grier School for Girls) is an independent all-girls college-preparatory boarding school in Tyrone, Pennsylvania in the United States. The school is located near the Pennsylvania State University, in the heart of the Appalachian Mountains and currently enrolls 296 students in grades 5 to 12.

== Admissions ==
Grier School hosts international students from more than 30 different countries each year. Grier offers ESL support classes during the school year. Before starting school, many international students must participate in the eight-week Summer TOEFL/SAT Program as preparation.

== Curriculum ==
Grier offers 21 AP classes in core disciplines.

== Extracurricular activities ==
=== Athletics ===
Grier requires students to participate in seasonal sports and offers a wide variety each term. Grier has an equestrian team as well as volleyball, basketball, Rock Climbing, soccer, dance, fencing and tennis teams. Grier has a dance program housed in a Performing Arts Center. Grier's Pre-Professional Dancers performed at Steps on Broadway in New York City and the Koresh Showcase in Philadelphia. Non-varsity sports include alpine skiing, yoga, body sculpting, archery, fencing, pickleball, and table tennis. Grier's equestrian program hosts over 40 horses in facilities that include two indoor rings and two outdoor rings. Grier offers riding lessons at all levels of ability. Each student must participate in a sport for at least 1 hour a day, 4 days a week.

=== Activities ===
Grier girls and Kiski boys enjoy a dance together at an annual prom. On the weekends, there are many activities offered, both on campus and off. Trips off-campus include visits to New York City to see Broadway shows, visits to museums in Pittsburgh and Washington, D.C., outing club activities, community service, horseback riding, skiing, shopping trips, bowling, trips to the movies, dinner outings, fly fishing, golfing, and other activities.

== Campus ==
Grier students live in dormitories housed in the main complex of buildings and in dormitories called "Cottages." Two girls share one bedroom and a bathroom with the two students down the hall. A pair of housemothers supervises each dorm, taking care of the girls there. Grier kitchen staff provide breakfast, lunch, and dinner each day. School and college counselors help students adjust to life at school and prepare for college. There is a Health Center on campus, staffed by registered nurses.

Grier School also hosts summer camps during the summer months, including a "sleep away" camp and day-camper programs. The summer camps attract students who enjoy horseback riding, dance, creative arts, and theater. At Grier summer camps, ages 7 to 18 may attend.

== Notable alumnae ==
- Paris Campbell Grace, American singer, TikToker, and comedian
- Camila Sodi, Mexican singer, actress, and model
