= Nate Blumberg =

American film executive

Nate J. Blumberg
- Born: February 4, 1894; Racine, Wisconsin, U.S.
- Died: July 24, 1960 (aged 66); Los Angeles, California, U.S.
- Resting place: Mount Sinai Memorial Park
- Occupation: Businessman
- Spouse: Vera Fox Blumberg
- Children: Lewis Fox Blumberg, Doris “Dodo” Meyer
- Relatives: Matthew M. Fox (brother-in-law)

Nathanial J. “Nate” Blumberg (February 4, 1894 – July 24, 1960) was a motion picture executive.

== Early life and education ==
Nate Blumberg was born in Racine, WI in 1894 to Jacob and Libbie (nee: Codner) Blumberg, a Jewish couple who had emigrated from Odesa, Russia. He had 3 older sisters and a 2 younger brothers. When he was 6 months old, his family moved to Milwaukee, WI. He attended the Cherry Street School as a youth. At the age of 12, he quit school to work at the Alhambra theater as an assistant property boy.

== Career ==
Working at the Alhambra theater, Blumberg worked his way up from usher to assistant treasurer before joining the circus as an advance man and ticket seller. In 1911, he started his career in film, working for the General Films Exchange as a salesman, under Harold Fitzgerald and alongside fellow salesman A.J. Balaban. In 1912, Blumberg worked for Charles E. Dubuque as property manager of the Majestic Theater (Milwaukee), and then became an associate for the Famous Players as a salesman for “Queen Elizabeth,” which starred Sarah Bernhardt. In 1914, he moved to New York to work with Hobart Bosworth selling the movie “Hypocrites,” directed by Lois Weber. On a sales call in 1915, Blumberg found himself back in Milwaukee to talk to Oscar Brachman, the owner of the Downer Theater. Mr. Brachman offered Mr. Blumberg the opportunity to become his business partner and manager of the Downer, which he accepted. After managing it for a year, the Downer failed to make a profit, and Blumberg, having spent all of his savings to keep it open, left broke. He returned to Racine in 1916 to manage the Palace and the (newly built) Rialto theaters. He eventually took over management of the Venetian and obtained a franchise on the Orpheum, which gave him control of all Racine theaters. He eventually purchased the Palace and Rialto theaters.

Universal and RKO Pictures:

In 1926, the Universal Theatrical Chain Enterprise took ownership of the Palace and Rialto theaters, and at founder Carl Laemmle’s request, Mr. Blumberg was kept on and promoted to state supervisor of their theaters. He oversaw Universal's theaters throughout Wisconsin, working from their offices inside the Carpenter Building in Milwaukee. In 1929, Laemmle threw Blumberg an elaborate testimonial dinner, and then unexpectedly fired him at the end of the ceremonies.

In April 1930, Blumberg was hired as assistant vice president under Joseph Plunkett, general manager for RKO theaters in Chicago, and given the responsibility of managing all theaters from Detroit to the west coast and from Minneapolis to New Orleans. In September 1934, RKO was reorganized and Blumberg was elected to RKO's parent company, (Keith-Albee-Orpheum Corp.), board of directors and assumed the role of vice president in charge of theater operations. The new role meant Blumberg would oversee all of KAO's holdings, which included; RKO procotor corp., Stadium theaters corp., RKO midwest corp., and all other RKO groups.

In November 1937, it was announced that on January 1, 1938, Blumberg would become the next president and general manager of the Universal Film Company, after the resignation of Robert H. Cochran. He served as Universal Pictures president from 1938 until 1952, when Universal was acquired by Decca Records and Milton Rackmil was named the new president. Blumberg was elected to chairman of the board of the merged companies, a position he held until his death in 1960.

== Personal life ==
In 1920, Blumberg married Vera Fox, the sister of Matthew M. Fox, in Racine, WI. Together, they had a daughter, Doris “Dodo” Meyer, and a son, Lewis Fox Blumberg. Blumberg and his wife donated 2 acres of land in North Hollywood so that the David Familian Chapel of Temple Adat Ariel could be built. He was named “1952’s Motion Picture Pioneer” by the Will Rogers Motion Picture Pioneers Foundation. He died on July 24, 1960, at his home in Van Nuys, CA.
