= List of ambassadors of Algeria to the United States =

Coordinates: 38.918056°N 77.048611°W

Ambassador of Algeria to United States
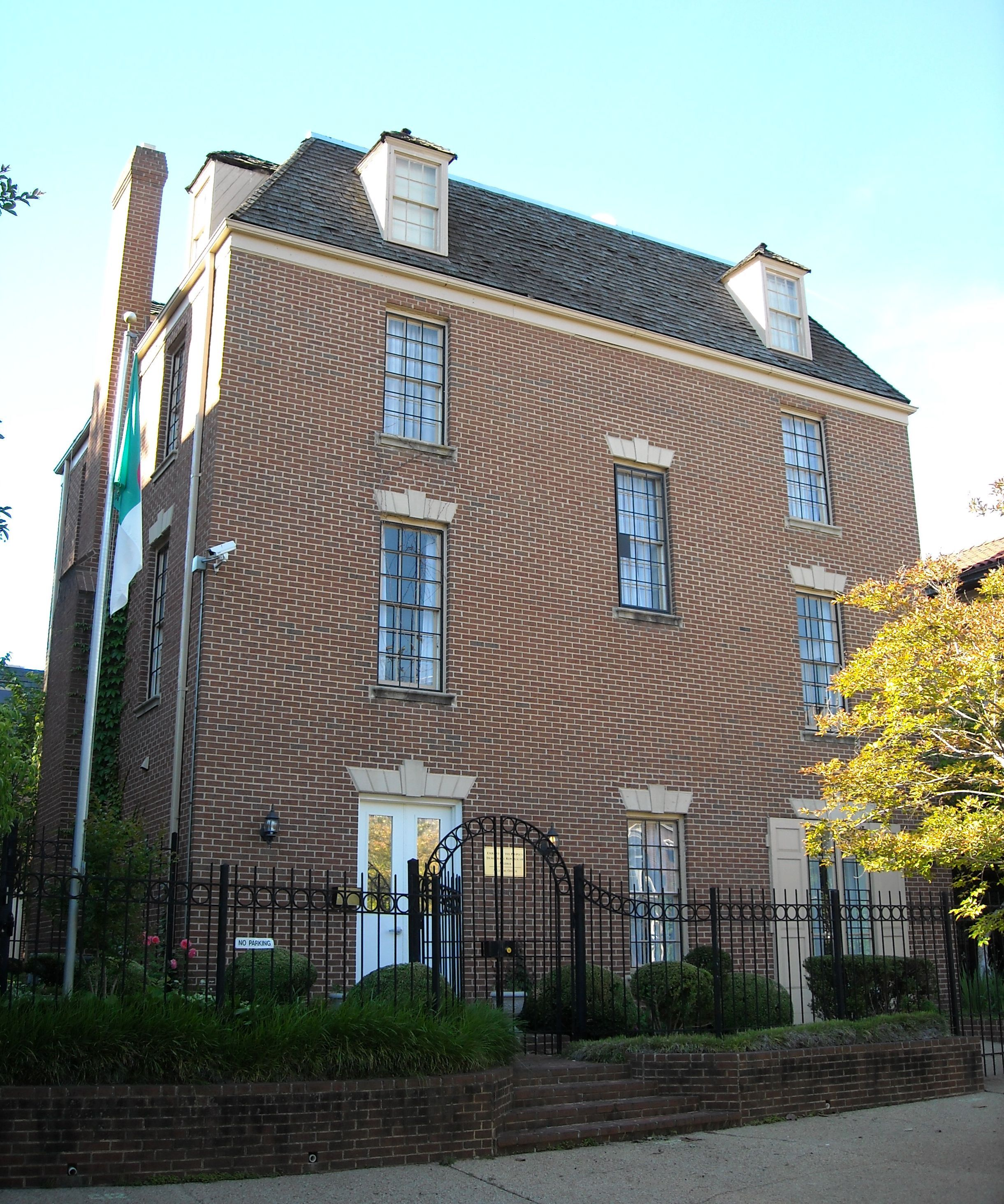
- Incumbent; Vacant
- Inaugural holder: Cherif Guellal
- Formation: July 24, 1963

The Algerian ambassador in Washington, D. C. is the official representative of the Government in Algiers to the Government of the United States.

== List of representatives ==
Diplomatic agrément	Diplomatic accreditation	Ambassador	Observations	List of heads of state of Algeria	List of presidents of the United States	Term end
June 19, 1963	July 24, 1963	Cherif Guellal		Ahmed Ben Bella	Lyndon B. Johnson	
October 10, 1966		Mohamed Seddik Benyahia	Agrément denied	Houari Boumedienne	Lyndon B. Johnson	
June 6, 1967			Six-Day War Protecting power Guinea	Houari Boumedienne	Lyndon B. Johnson	November 12, 1974
November 12, 1974		Abdelkader Maadini	Acting Head of Algerian Interests Section	Houari Boumedienne	Gerald Ford	
June 10, 1977	June 24, 1977	fr:Abdelaziz Maoui		Houari Boumedienne	Jimmy Carter	
October 16, 1979	November 28, 1979	Redha Malek		Chadli Bendjedid	Jimmy Carter	
August 20, 1982		Slim Tahar Debagha	Chargé d'affaires, 1965: Ambassador in Tokyo	Chadli Bendjedid	Ronald Reagan	
August 27, 1982		Boumediene M. Kebir	Chargé d'affaires, Algerian diplomat in charge of the interest section	Chadli Bendjedid	Ronald Reagan	
September 14, 1982	September 24, 1982	Layachi Yaker	1975: foreignminister	Chadli Bendjedid	Ronald Reagan	
September 20, 1984	November 26, 1984	Mohamed Sahnoun		Chadli Bendjedid	Ronald Reagan	
March 29, 1989	May 11, 1989	Abderrahane Bensid		Chadli Bendjedid	George H. W. Bush	
February 3, 1992	March 11, 1992	Noureddine Yazid Zerhouni		Muhammad Boudiaf	George H. W. Bush	
February 15, 1995	March 20, 1995	Hadj Osmane Bencherif	(WH credentials)	Liamine Zéroual	Bill Clinton	
June 11, 1996	July 29, 1996	Ramtane Lamamra		Liamine Zéroual	Bill Clinton	
January 5, 2000	February 3, 2000	Idri Jazairy		Abdelaziz Bouteflika	Bill Clinton	
May 10, 2005	May 26, 2005	Amine Kherbi		Abdelaziz Bouteflika	George W. Bush	
November 5, 2008	December 3, 2008	Abdallah Baali		Abdelaziz Bouteflika	George W. Bush	
February 11, 2015	February 23, 2015	Madjid Bouguerra		Abdelaziz Bouteflika	Barack Obama	October 31, 2021
November 29, 2021		Ahmed Boutache		Abdelmadjid Tebboune	Joe Biden	September 20, 2022
October 2022		Mohammed Haneche		Abdelmadjid Tebboune	Joe Biden	2023
2023		Sabri Boukadoum		Abdelmadjid Tebboune	Joe Biden	

- Algeria–United States relations
