= Algeria–United States relations =

- Algeria: United States

Diplomatic mission
- Algerian Embassy, Washington, D.C.: United States Embassy, Algiers

Envoy
- Algerian Ambassador to the United States Sabri Boukadoum: United States Ambassador to Algeria Mark A. Schapiro

In July 2001, President Abdelaziz Bouteflika became the first Algerian President to visit the White House since 1985. This visit, followed by a second meeting in November 2001, and President Bouteflika's participation at the June 2004 G8 Sea Island Summit, is indicative of the growing relationship between the United States and Algeria. Since the September 11 attacks in the United States, contacts in key areas of mutual concern, including law enforcement and counter-terrorism cooperation, have intensified. Algeria publicly condemned the terrorist attacks on the United States and has been strongly supportive of the Global War on Terrorism. The United States and Algeria consult closely on key international and regional issues. The pace and scope of senior-level visits has accelerated.

== History ==
=== Precolonial Period ===
The European maritime powers paid the tribute demanded by the rulers of the pirate states of North Africa (Algiers, Tunis, Tripoli) to prevent attacks on their cargo by privateers. No longer covered by English tribute payments after the American Revolution, US merchant ships were seized and sailors enslaved in the years following independence. In 1794, the US Congress allocated funds for the construction of warships to counter the threat of piracy in the Mediterranean. Despite the naval preparations, the United States concluded a treaty with the dey of Algiers in 1797, guaranteeing the payment of tribute amounting to US$10 million over a period of twelve years in exchange for a promise that Algerian privateers would not disturb the US fleets. Ransom and tribute payments to pirate states amounted to 20 per cent of the US government's annual revenues in 1804.

On 5 September 1795, when the two countries signed the Treaty of Peace and Friendship between the United States and the Regency of Algiers, a few years after the Regency's official recognition of the independence of the young American republic (1783), Algeria was among the first countries to recognise the independence of the United States.

Being desirous of establishing and cultivating Peace and Harmony between our Nation and the Dey, Regency, and People of Algiers, I have appointed David Humphreys, one of our distinguished Citizens, a Commissioner Plenipotentiary, giving him full Power to negotiate and conclude a Treaty of Amity and Commerce with you. And I pray you to give full credit to whatever shall be delivered to you on the part of the United States, by him, and particularly when he shall assure you of our sincere desire to be in Peace and Friendship with you, and your People. And I pray God to give you Health and Happiness. Done at Philadelphia this Twenty first day of March 1793, and in the seventeenth Year of the Independence of these United States.
— George Washington, Philadelphia, 21 March 1793

=== Colonial period ===
The Napoleonic Wars of the early 19th century diverted the attention of the maritime powers from suppressing what they considered piracy. But when peace was restored to Europe in 1815, Algiers found itself at war with Spain, the Netherlands, Prussia, Denmark, Russia, and Naples. In March of that year, in what became the Second Barbary War, the United States Congress authorized naval action against the Barbary States, the Turkish Muslim states Algiers, Tunis, and Tripoli. Commodore Stephen Decatur was dispatched with a squadron of ten warships to ensure the safety of United States shipping in the Mediterranean and to force an end to the payment of tribute. After capturing several corsairs and their crews, Decatur sailed into the harbor of Algiers, threatened the city with his guns, and concluded a favorable treaty in which the dey agreed to discontinue demands for tribute, pay reparations for damage to United States property, release United States prisoners without ransom, and prohibit further interference with United States trade by Algerian corsairs. No sooner had Decatur set off for Tunis to enforce a similar agreement than the dey repudiated the treaty. The next year, an Anglo-Dutch fleet, commanded by British admiral Viscount Exmouth, delivered a nine-hour bombardment of Algiers. The attack immobilized many of the dey's corsairs and obtained from him a second treaty that reaffirmed the conditions imposed by Decatur. In addition, the dey agreed to end the practice of enslaving Christians.

The Eisenhower administration gave military equipment to France during the Algerian War of Independence. However, France did not trust U.S. intentions in the Maghreb area, especially since the U.S. had friendly relations with Morocco and Tunisia after the two countries had won their independence. The United States tried to balance the situation with Algeria without alienating France. The FLN tried to appeal to America to support its independence.

=== Algerian mediation in the Iran hostage crisis ===
Algeria played a key role in the Iran hostage crisis by serving as a neutral mediator between Iran and the United States. The country's initial efforts simply saw Algerian intermediaries pass on communications between the Iranian and American governments, but as bilateral talks reached a deadlock, it took on a more active role to solve the crisis. Both countries eventually accepted Algeria's proposals, culminating in the signing of the Algiers Accords on 19 January 1981, after which Iran released all of the remaining American hostages that it had held at the Embassy of the United States in Tehran since 4 November 1979. Further, because the incident resulted in the severance of Iran–United States diplomatic relations, Algeria briefly served as Iran's protecting power in the United States before the role was passed on to Pakistan, while Switzerland has served as the United States' protecting power in Iran.

The first American ambassador in Algiers was William J. Porter, who was the head of the North African Desk at the State Department when John F. Kennedy showed support to the Algerian independence.

The United States asked for the help of Algerian government on multiple occasions. Ambassador at Large Averell Harriman visited Algiers in December 1966 to ask the Algerian government to intercede with North Vietnamese authorities in favor of American prisoners and to explore the possibility for Algeria to help finding a solution to the Vietnam War.

In 1969, prominent members of the Black Panthers had settled in Algiers and established the International Section of the Black Panthers Party. In 1972, Willie Roger Holder a Vietnam war veteran and Catherine Marie Kerkow hijacked Western airlines flight 701 from Los Angeles to Seattle and flew to Algeria with a $500.000 ransom to be donated to the Black Panthers. They were granted political asylum but the Algerian authorities seized the ransom money and returned it to the United States.

On November 1, 1979 Deputy Secretary of the State Department Zbigniew Brzezinski attended the celebration of the 25th anniversary of the beginning of the revolution for the independence of Algeria. The next day he met briefly with the new prime minister of Iran Mehdi Bazargan. Three days later, on November 5, the U.S. ambassador in Algiers received an instruction from the State Department requesting him to contact the Ministry of Foreign Affairs secretly as revealed by "Public library of US diplomacy". The State Department wanted to see if Algerian authorities could be of any help after the U.S. Embassy in Tehran had been invaded and U.S. citizens detained. The Algerian president immediately sent his ambassador back to his post in Tehran, with no result. In December 1979, the Revolutionary Council invited 3 American clergymen and Algerian archbishop Cardinal Duval, the Roman Catholic Archbishop of Algiers, to celebrate Christmas with the hostages.

President Jimmy Carter wanted to obtain the release of the hostages before leaving office. He asked a second time for the help of Algeria, the American diplomats knowing that the Algerian government had kept good relations with Tehran. But they were very doubtful about the ability of the Algerian staff to find a solution to this crisis after all the other previous intermediaries such as former prime minister of Sweden Olof Palme and United Nations General Secretary Kurt Waldheim had failed. Waldheim brought a team of legal experts around him (including Louis-Edmond Pettiti, president of the Paris bar association, Andres Aguilar, former Venezuelan minister of justice, Adib Daoudi, adviser to Syrian president, Hector Jayewardene, a lawyer from Sri Lanka and Mohamed Bejaoui, Algerian representative at the UN) to meet with Iranian representatives in Geneva. This UN delegation turned out to be totally unable to make any progress on the case. Therefore the idea was to use the Algerian mediation for communicating indirectly with the Iranians only. This approach was consistent with Algeria’s role as diplomatic agent (protecting power) for Iran in the United States (while the Swiss embassy was the protecting power for United States interests in Iran).

In October 1980, the Iranian minister of foreign affairs Mohamad-Ali Rajai went to New York to attend the United Nations General Assembly to present his country’s case against Iraq. Warren Christopher then Deputy Secretary of State seized the opportunity of a meeting between Rajai and the Algerian ambassador to the United Nations to have a contact with the Iranian minister. But he refused to meet any American official. Nevertheless, at this point Algeria started to get involved in the hostages matter and when Mr Rajai made a stop in Algiers on his way back to Tehran the Algerian diplomats offered their help to find a solution to the hostages crisis by facilitating the communication between the two countries.

Two days before the presidential elections in the United States, the Iranian parliament (Majlis) voted on November 2, 1980 the release of the American citizens detained in Iran in the case the United States accept to meet 4 conditions:

1. First and foremost to unfreeze Iranian assets in U.S. banks,
2. To return the wealth collected by the late Shah during his reign,
3. To withdraw all lawsuits against Iran in the United States
4. To pledge non-intervention in Iranian affairs.

The message was immediately delivered by the Algerian foreign minister Benyahia to the State Department with a letter confirming that the Algerian government was officially considered an intermediary by Iran. The Iranian ministry of foreign affairs stressed that the United States government was requested to "announce its response as soon as possible" and "to inform the world" of the American answer to the hostage release condition.

The Algerian foreign minister sent the ambassadors to Tehran to receive from the Iranians their detailed proposal for the release of the hostages. They started a diplomatic shuttle between Tehran and Washington DC. Their role was strictly limited to transporting messages between the negotiators of the two country but were not themselves contributing to these negotiations. The Algerian diplomats were then referred in the press as "the mailmen".

The only Iranian condition that was political, concerning the pledge of non-intervention of the United States in Iranian affairs did not present any difficulty and did not necessitate any negotiation. The American diplomats in Algiers made a declaration that was later transmitted to the Iranians and included in the Algiers Accords : "It is and from now on will be the policy of the United States not to intervene, directly or indirectly, politically or militarily, in Iran's internal affairs".

But the main condition imposed by Iran for the release of the American hostages required a very complex financial negotiation concerning frozen assets under the form of cash, gold bullion and securities mainly U.S. Treasury Bonds, kept in various American banks, branches of American banks abroad and international banks based in the United States and controlled by the U.S. Department of Treasury and the Federal Reserve Bank. President Carter and the State Department were worried that the magnitude and complexity of the legal and financial matter would delay considerably the release of the hostages, considering that the Iranians would not be confident enough to release them after receiving only a fraction of their assets with no guarantee for future transfers. On November 11, the American team comprising experts from the State Department and the Treasury Department led by Warren Christopher was in Algiers. They presented the first U.S. proposal to be transmitted to the Iranians who later rejected it.

==== Third contact: Algerian intervention ====
The Algerian minister and the ambassadors had passed messages and delivered letters, but they were not qualified to initiate the negotiations on extremely complex financial matters between two countries with totally antagonistic views. The American authorities being themselves unable to progress in the negotiation were very skeptical about the ability of the Algerians to be of any help to solve such complex legal and financial problems and to gain trust from both sides to reach a final agreement.

The complexity of the financial negotiation was due to multiple factors :

- The Iranian claim amount : USD 24 billion, under the form of cash, but also gold and securities with fluctuating values.
- American companies' claims for payments of goods and services exported to Iran
- Iranian claims for goods and services that had been paid but not received from U.S. firms, e.g. before the revolution the Iranian government was in the middle of important acquisitions if airplanes and military equipment from the U.S.

==== Global settlement designed by the Algerian governor ====
The new Algerian negotiator presented his proposal for a global settlement of the financial and legal disputes with a plan to organize the release of the hostages with no delay due to the transfer of the Iranian funds from the United states to Iran through his institution the central bank in Algiers. On January 7, 1981, Mr Nabavi, member of the government as minister of Executive Affairs and head of the Iranian negotiation team held a press conference to announce that he was studying the "Algerian proposal" and would give an answer rapidly.

The negotiated deal that was targeted by the Algerian negotiator was:

- First phase : to arrange the release of a portion of the Iranian frozen assets that would be significant enough for the Iranians to proceed with the release of the hostages which Algeria view as an urgent humanitarian gesture
- Second phase : to set up an arbitration tribunal to deal with all the pending financial litigation which later became the IRAN-US Claims Tribunal based in The Hague.

==== U.S. releases frozen Iranian government funds ====
Iran received $2.9 billion of the $8 billion transferred to the Central Bank of Algeria from the escrow account in the Bank of England.

The arbitration tribunal included in the Algerian Proposal played an important role until recent years.

=== Present day ===
==== Post-independence ====
Algeria and the United States have a complicated relationship that has improved politically and economically. When John F. Kennedy was still a senator, he spoke in support of Algerian independence to The New York Times on July 2, 1957. During his presidency, Kennedy congratulated Algeria after it had won its independence from the French in 1962. Prime Minister Ben Bella visited President Kennedy on October 15, 1962, one day before the Cuban Missile Crisis started. However, Algeria cut off diplomacy in 1967 because of the Arab-Israeli War, since it supported the Arab countries while the United States was on the Israeli side. In 1971 Natural Gas Corporation from El Paso and Algerian Sonatrach signed an 25 years long agreement on export of 15 billion cubic meters of natural gas starting from 1974. President Nixon was able to reestablish relations and President Boumédiène visited the United States on April 11, 1974.

During the Iranian hostage crisis, Algeria mediated negotiation between the United States and Iran. The Algiers Declarations was signed on January 19, 1981. Iran released 52 American hostages on January 20, 1981.

==== 9/11 ====
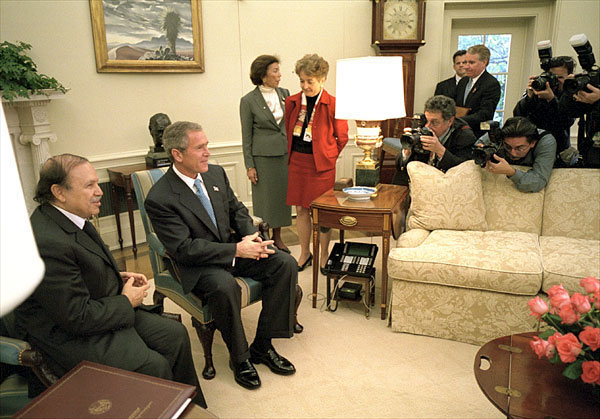
George W. Bush and Abdelaziz Bouteflika in the Oval Office on November 5, 2001

After the September 11 attacks on the World Trade Center and the Pentagon, Algeria was one of the first countries to offer its support to the US and continued to play a key role in the struggle against terrorism. It has been working since then closely with the United States to eliminate transnational terrorism. The United States made Algeria a "pivotal state" in the war on terror. One of the major agreements between the two countries allowed the U.S. to use an airfield in Southern Algeria to deploy surveillance aircraft. After this, the U.S. has been more neutral on Algerian government political and civil rights violations. Algeria persists in leading the battle against terrorism in Africa.

==== Mid-2000s–present ====
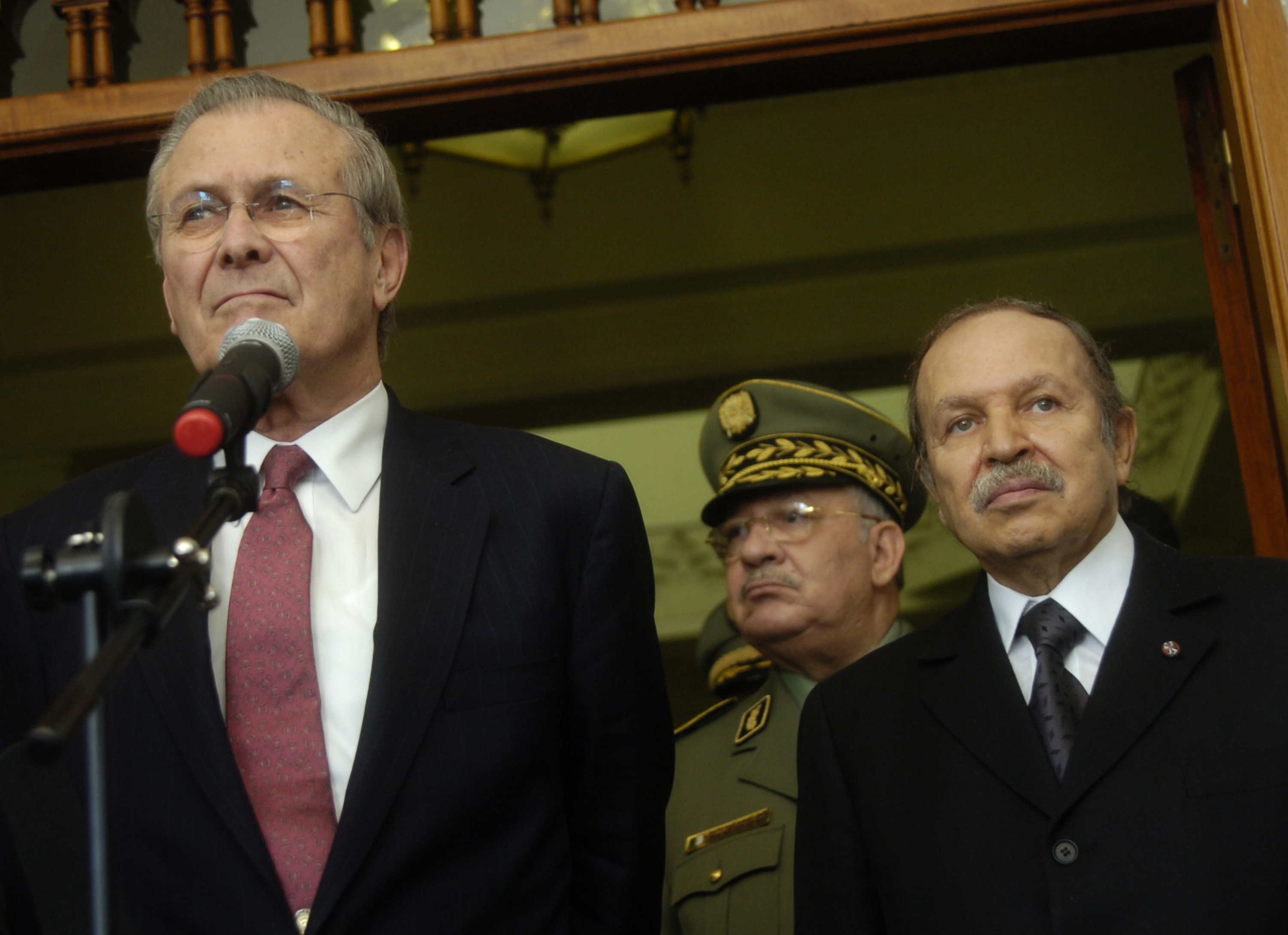
Donald H. Rumsfeld and Bouteflika listen to a reporter's question during a press availability on the steps of the Presidential Palace in Algiers, on Feb. 12, 2006.

In August 2005, then-Chairman of the United States Senate Committee on Foreign Relations, Senator Richard G. Lugar, led a delegation to oversee the release of the remaining 404 Moroccan prisoners of war held by the Polisario Front in Algeria. Their release removed a longstanding bilateral obstacle between Algeria and Morocco.

In April 2006, then-Foreign Minister Mohammed Bedjaoui met with U.S. Secretary of State Condoleezza Rice.

As of 2007, the official U.S. presence was Algeria is expanding following over a decade of limited staffing, reflecting the general improvement in the security environment. Between 2004 and 2007, the U.S. Embassy moved toward more normal operations and as of 2007 provided most embassy services to the American and Algerian communities.

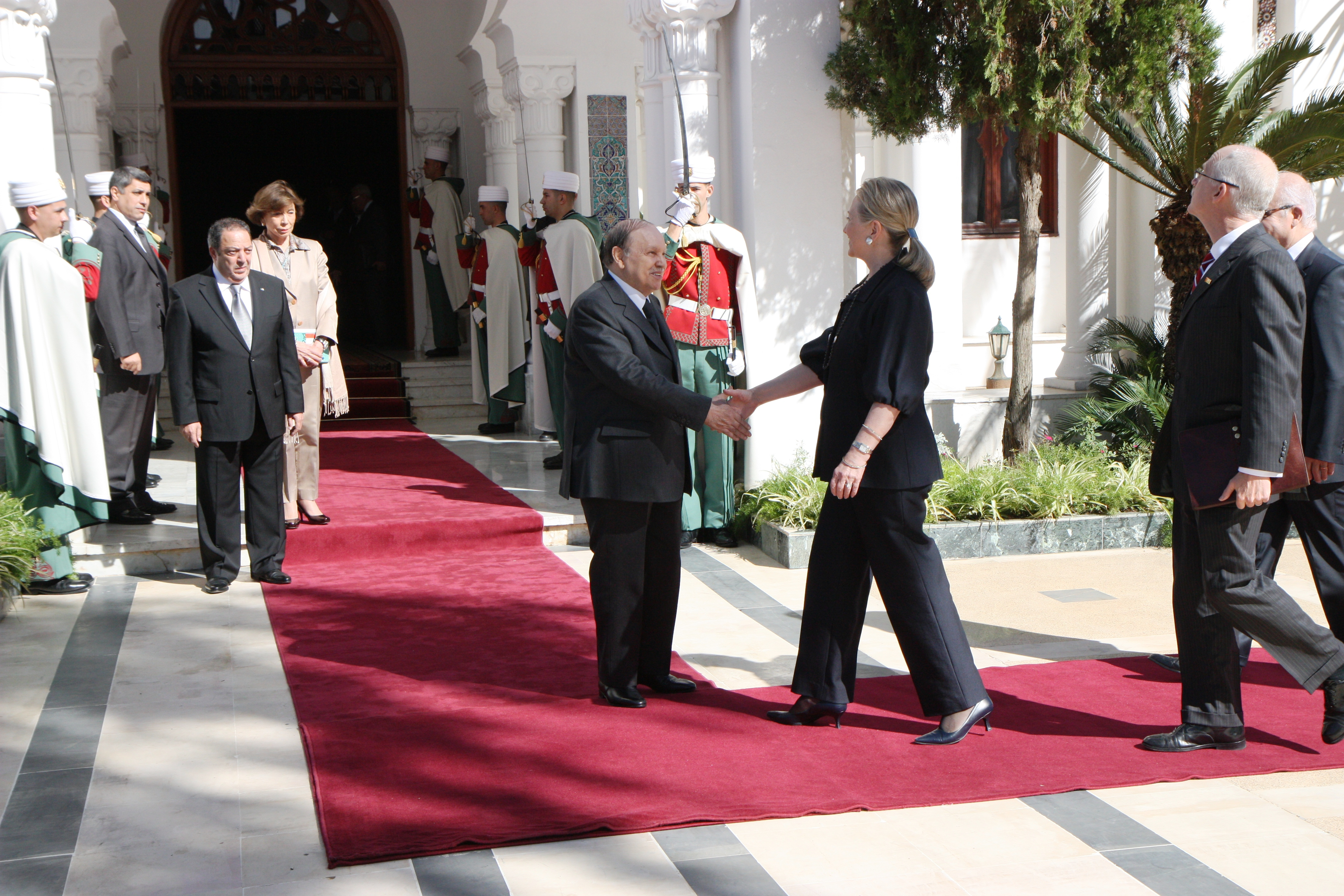
Hillary Clinton shakes hands with President Abdelaziz Bouteflika in Algiers, October 2012.

President Bouteflika welcomed President Barack Obama's election and said he would be glad to work with him to further cooperation between the two countries. The intensity of the cooperation between Algeria and the United States is illustrated by the number and frequency of senior-level visits made by civilian and military officials of both countries. Relations between Algeria and the United States have entered a new, dynamic phase. While characterized by close collaboration on regional and international issues of mutual interest, ties between both countries are also defined by the significance and level of their cooperation in the economic area. The number of US corporations already active or exploring business ventures in Algeria has increased significantly over the past few years, reflecting growing confidence in the Algerian market and institutions. Senior officers of the Algerian Army, including its chief of staff and the secretary general of the Ministry of National Defense, have made official visits in the United States. Algeria has hosted US Navy and Coast Guard visits and took part with the United States in NATO joint naval exercises. The increasing level of cooperation and exchanges between Algeria and the United States has generated bilateral agreements in numerous areas, including the Agreement on Science and Technology Cooperation, signed in January 2006. An agreement was concluded recently between the Government of Algeria and the Government of the United States, entering into force on November 1, 2009, pursuant to which the maximum validity for several categories of visas granted to Algerian citizens coming to the United States was extended to 24 months. A mutual legal assistance treaty and a Customs Cooperation Agreement will also be signed soon.

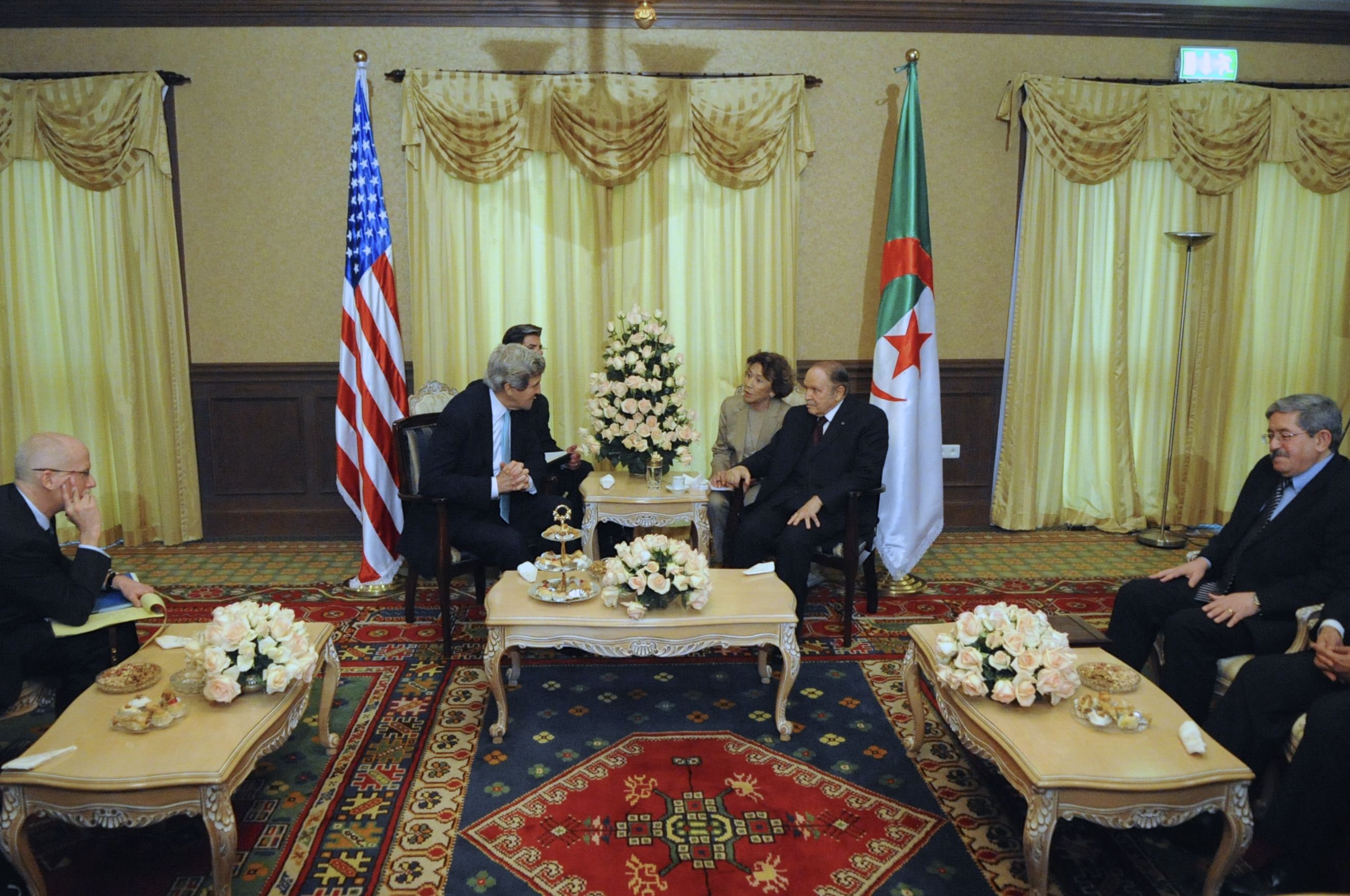
Bouteflika with U.S. Secretary of State John Kerry, Algiers, in 2014

On 20 January 2013, the United States Department of State issued a travel warning to United States citizens for the country of Algeria in response to the In Aménas hostage crisis.

Algeria has stated that it is dedicated to sustaining its good relations with the U.S. in July 2016.

In 2020, the United States recognized Moroccan sovereignty over the disputed territory of Western Sahara in exchange for Moroccan normalization of relations with Israel. Algeria said the U.S. decision to recognize Moroccan sovereignty over Western Sahara "has no legal effect because it contradicts U.N. resolutions, especially U.N. Security Council resolutions on Western Sahara".

In February 2024, President Joe Biden appointed Joshua Harris, the U.S. Under Secretary of State for North African Affairs, as the new U.S. Ambassador to Algeria, replacing Ambassador Elizabeth Moore Aubin, who had held the position since February 9, 2022, according to a press release issued on the official White House website.

== Algerian leaders' visits to the United States ==
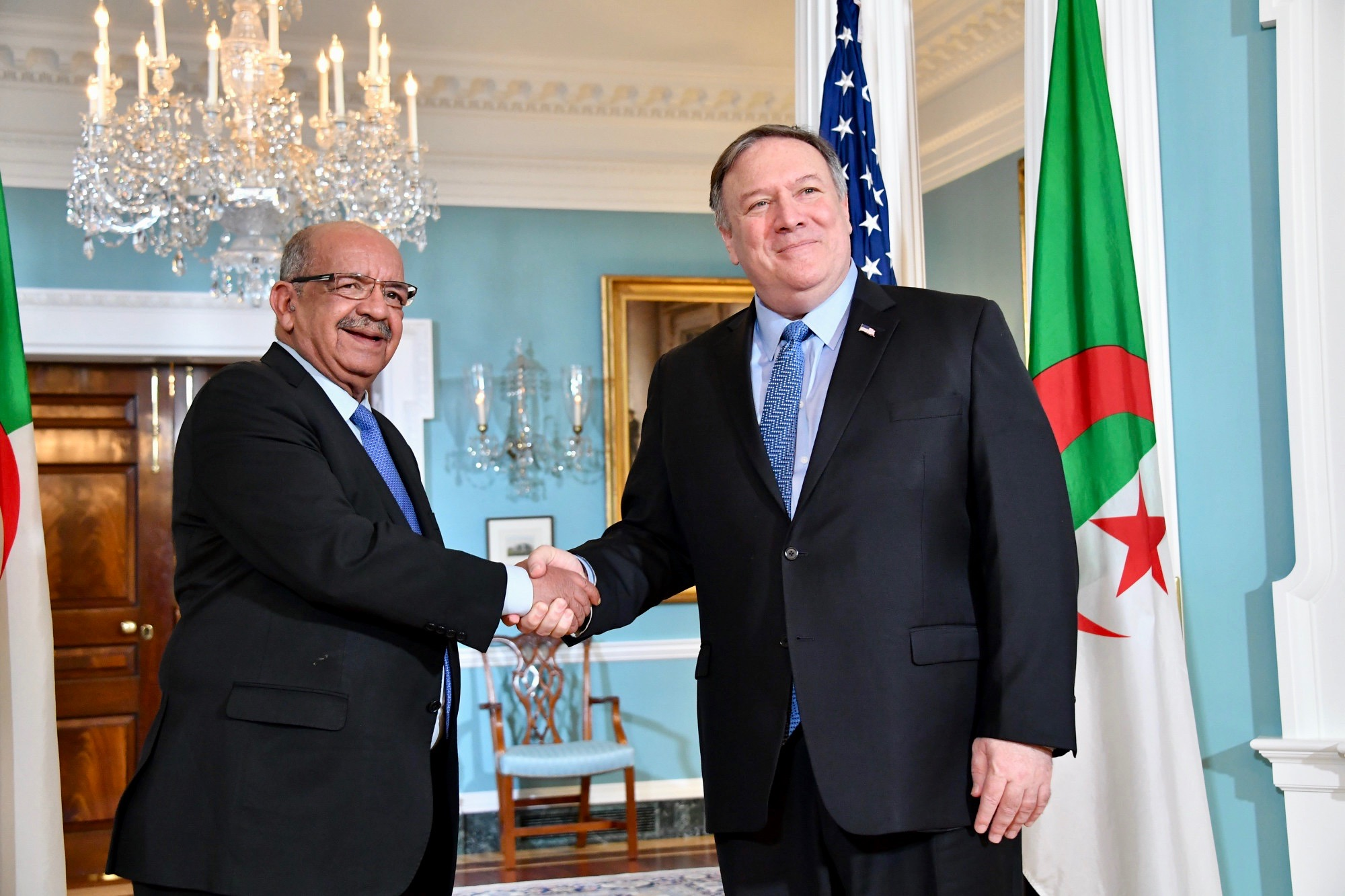
Secretary of State Mike Pompeo with Algerian Foreign Minister Abdelkader Messahel in January 2019

Algerian leaders have visited the United States a total of seven times. The first visit took place on October 14–15, 1962 when Prime Minister Ben Bella stopped by Washington D.C. President Boumediene privately visited Washington and met with Nixon on April 11, 1974. President Chedli Bendjedid came for a State Visit from April 16–22, 1985. President Abdelaziz Bouteflika visited July 11–14, 2001, November 5, 2001, and June 9–10, 2004. Prime Minister Abdelmalek Sellal attended the U.S.-Africa Leaders Summit on August 5–6, 2016. In December 2022, former Prime Minister Aymen Benabderrahmane attended the 2022 U.S - Africa summit.

== Trade ==
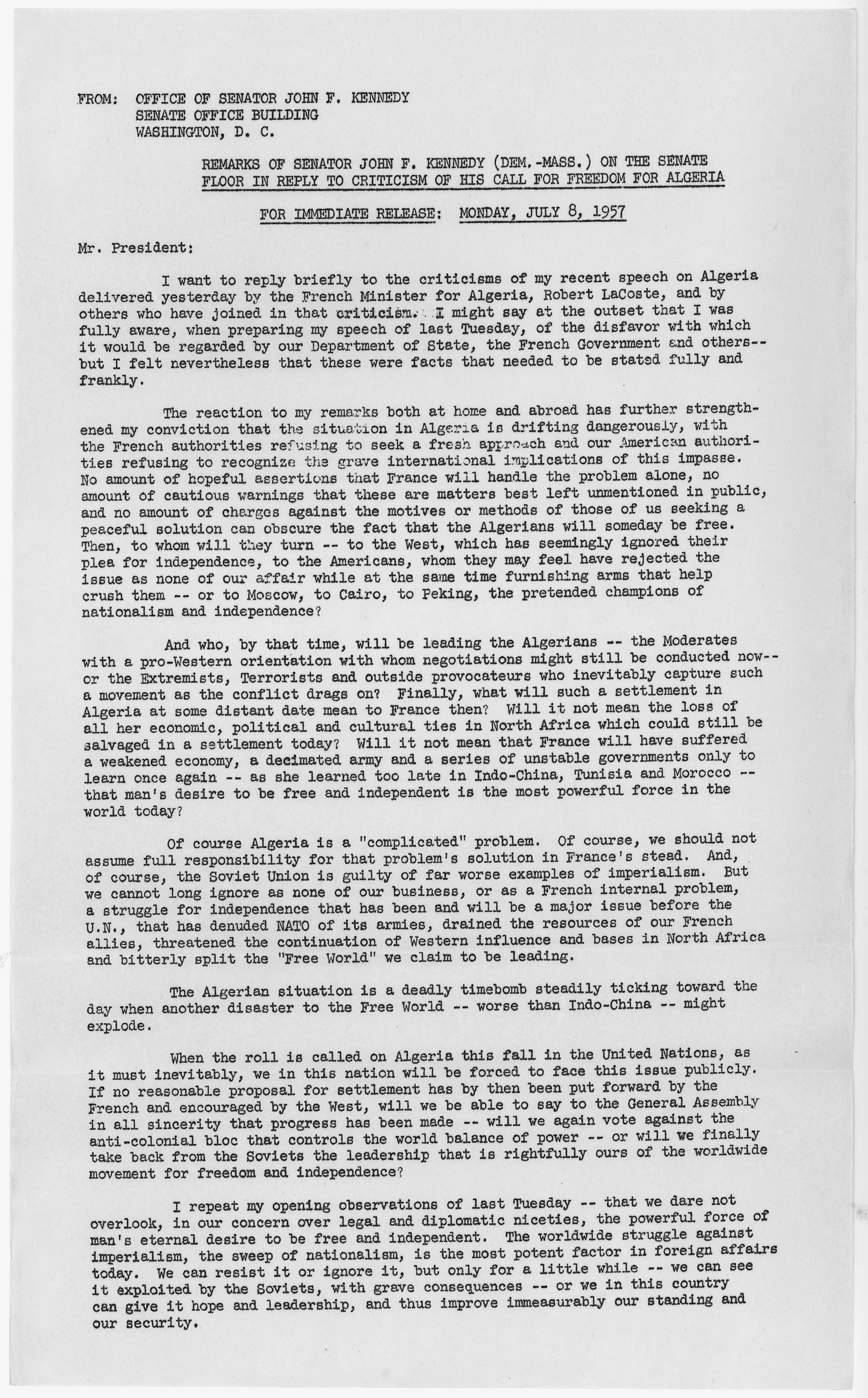
Remarks of Senator John F. Kennedy on the Senate Floor in Reply to Criticism on his Call for Freedom for Algeria

In 2006, U.S. direct investment in Algeria totaled $5.3 billion, mostly in the petroleum sector, which U.S. companies dominate. American companies are active in the banking and finance sectors, as well as in services, pharmaceuticals, medical facilities, telecommunications, aviation, seawater desalination, energy production, and information technology. Algeria is the United States' 3rd-largest market in the Middle East/North African region. U.S. exports to Algeria totaled $1.2 billion in 2005, an increase of more than 50% since 2003. U.S. imports from Algeria grew from $4.7 billion in 2002 to $10.8 billion in 2005, primarily in oil and liquefied natural gas. In March 2004, President Bush designated Algeria a beneficiary country for duty-free treatment under the Generalized System of Preferences.

In July 2001, the United States and Algeria signed a Trade and Investment Framework Agreement, which established common principles on which the economic relationship is founded and forms a platform for negotiating a bilateral investment treaty and a free-trade agreement. The two governments meet on a regular basis in order to discuss trade and investment policies and opportunities, as well as to enhance their economic relationship. Within the framework of the U.S.-North African Economic Partnership, the United States provided about $1 million in technical assistance to Algeria in 2003. This program supported and encouraged Algeria's economic reform program and included support for World Trade Organization accession negotiations, debt management, and improving the investment climate. In 2003, the U.S.-North African Economic Partnership programs were rolled over into Middle East Partnership Initiative activities, which provide funding for political and economic development programs in Algeria.

== Military ==
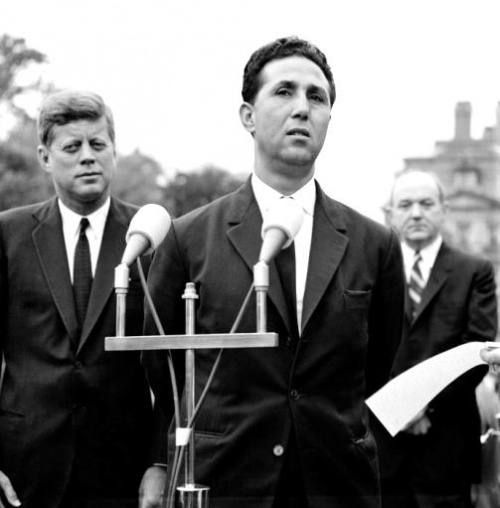
Ahmed Ben Bella's visit to the White House on 15 October 1962

As of 2007, cooperation between the Algerian and U.S. militaries continued to grow. Exchanges between both sides are frequent, and Algeria has hosted senior U.S. military officials. In May 2005, the United States and Algeria conducted their first formal joint military dialogue in Washington, DC; the second joint military dialogue took place in Algiers in November 2006. The NATO Supreme Allied Commander, Europe and Commander, U.S. European Command, General James L. Jones visited Algeria in June and August 2005, and then-Secretary of Defense Donald Rumsfeld visited Algeria in February 2006. The United States and Algeria have also conducted bilateral naval and Special Forces exercises, and Algeria has hosted U.S. Navy and Coast Guard ship visits. The United States has a modest International Military Education and Training Program ($824,000 in FY 2006) for training Algerian military personnel in the United States, and Algeria participates in the Trans-Sahara Counter-Terrorism Partnership.

The Secretary of State hosted a Strategic Dialogue with the Algerian Foreign Minister in April 2015. Additionally, the Deputy Secretary of State paid a visit to Algeria in July 2016.

On January 22, 2025, U.S. Marine Corps Gen Michael Langley, Commander of U.S. Africa Command, signed a Military Cooperation Memorandum of Understanding (MOU) with the Algerian Minister Delegate to the Minister of National Defense and Chief of Staff to the National People’s Army, General Saïd Chanegriha.

== Education and culture ==
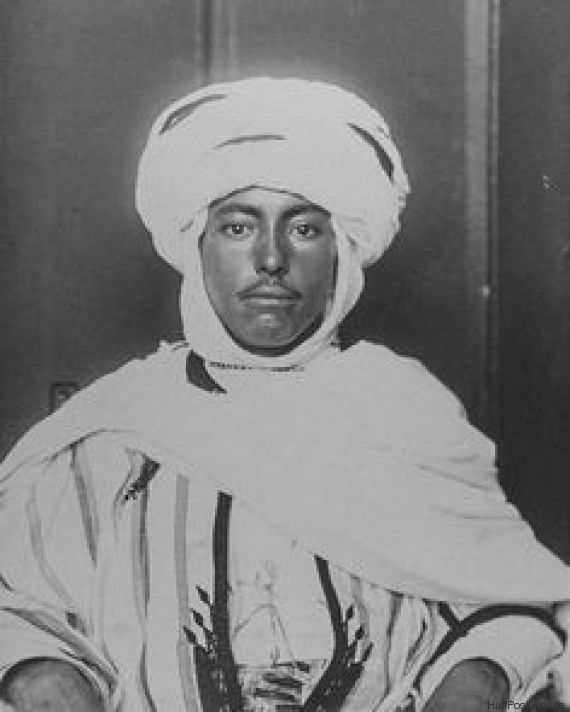
A picture showing an Algerian immigrant at Ellis Island, ca. 1909

The first U.S.A and Algerian collaboration in the education field started in 1959 when the Institute of International Education cooperated with the National Student Association in 1959 to bring Algerian students to study in our universities. After the independence, it established the Institute of Electrical Engineering and Electronics, the only institute in North Africa that follows an American model way of teaching. The United States has implemented modest university linkages programs and has placed two English-Language Fellows, the first since 1993, with the Ministry of Education to assist in the development of English as a second language courses at the Ben Aknoune Training Center. In 2006, Algeria was again the recipient of a grant under the Ambassadors Fund for Cultural Preservation, which provided $106,110 to restore the El Pacha Mosque in Oran. Algeria also received an $80,000 grant to fund microscholarships to design and implement an American English-language program for Algerian high school students in four major cities.

Initial funding through the Middle East Partnership Initiative has been allocated to support the work of Algeria's developing civil society through programming that provides training to journalists, businesspersons, legislators, Internet regulators, and the heads of leading nongovernmental organizations. Additional funding through the U.S. Department of State's Human Rights and Democracy Fund will assist civil society groups focusing on the issues of the disappeared, and Islam and democracy.

== Resident diplomatic missions ==
- Algeria has an embassy in Washington, D.C. and has consulates-general in New York City and in San Francisco.
- United States has an embassy in Algiers.
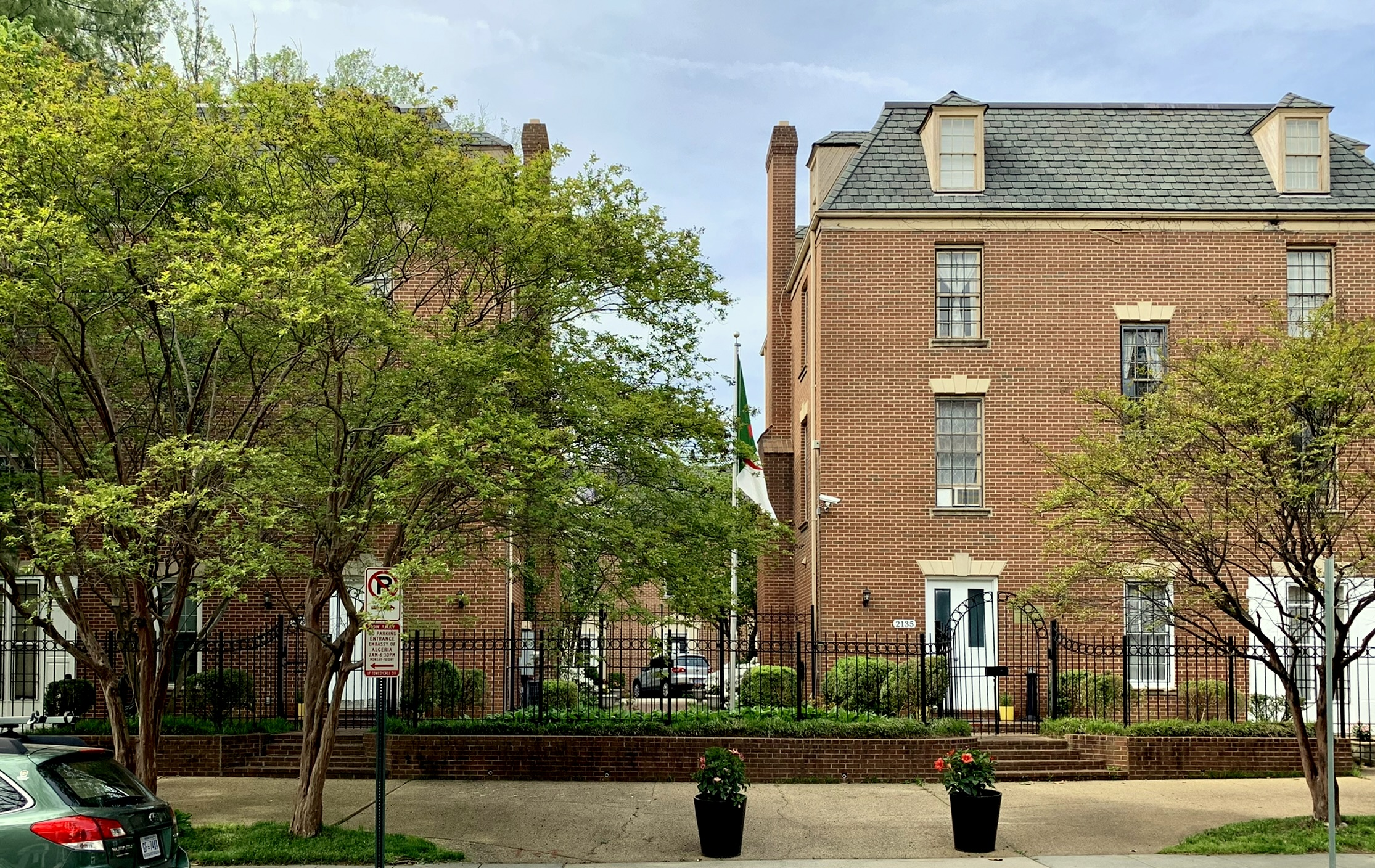
Embassy of Algeria in Washington, D.C.

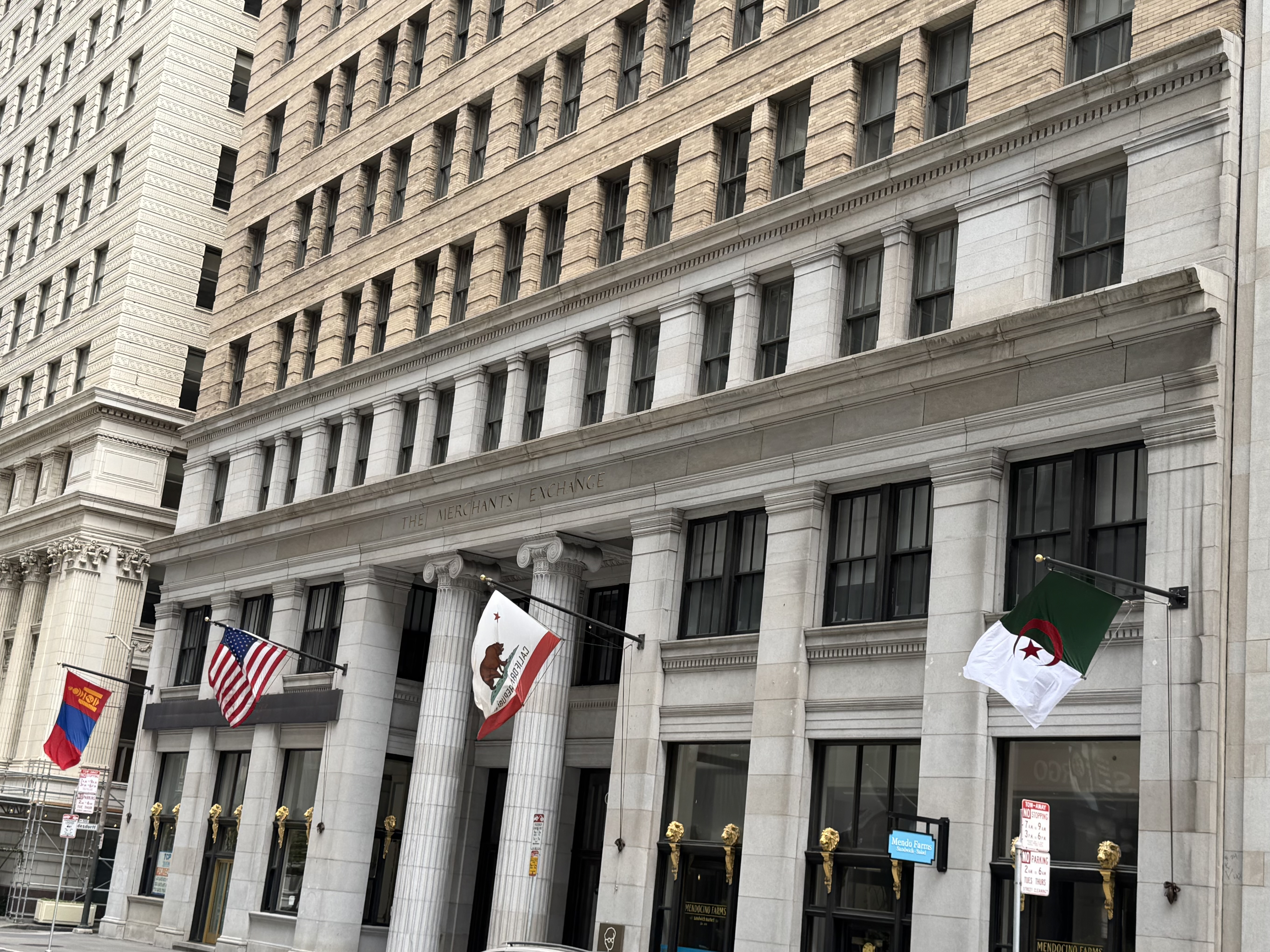
Consulate-General of Algeria in San Francisco

== See also ==
- Foreign relations of Algeria
- Foreign relations of the United States
