= John Campbell (blues guitarist) =

American songwriter

- Also known as: Johnny "Slim" Campbell
- Born: John Allen Campbell; January 20, 1952; Shreveport, Louisiana, U.S.
- Died: June 13, 1993 (aged 41) New York City, New York City
- Genres: Blues, Delta blues, electric blues
- Occupations: Guitarist, singer, songwriter
- Instruments: Guitar, vocals
- Labels: Elektra, Sync, Cross Cut, Blue Rock'it, Sphere Sound
- Spouse: Yolande Dolly Fox

John Allen Campbell (January 20, 1952 – June 13, 1993) was an American blues guitarist, singer, and songwriter.

== Biography ==
Campbell was born and grew up in Shreveport, Louisiana, United States.

His first group was the Texas-based electric power trio, Junction. Formed in 1973 in Corpus Christi, Texas, the band consisted of John on guitar and vocals, Tim Delaney on bass and vocals, and Jack "Satch" Haupt on drums and vocals. The trio disbanded two years later. Campbell cut his first album titled Street Suite around this same time.

At the eve of the 1980s, he spent a time at the Robin Hood Studios in Tyler, Texas, and taped a demo with his acoustic versions of blues standards. In 2000, these twelve tracks were issued as the compilation album, Tyler, Texas Session.

As a solo artist, Campbell continued to play in clubs of East Texas and he also appeared in New Orleans, Louisiana. In 1985, he moved to New York City, New York, and joined the local blues scene.

His album, A Man And His Blues, featured Ronnie Earl as producer and guest guitarist, was recorded during two days in April 1988, and was released on a small German record label. Its follow-up releases were on Elektra, One Believer (1991) and Howlin Mercy (1993). His "When the Levee Breaks," was a cover of the country blues song written and first recorded by Kansas Joe McCoy and Memphis Minnie in 1929 and covered also by Led Zeppelin.

Campbell had a "distinctive rhythm and slide-heavy style". His favored instruments were a 1952 Gibson Southern Jumbo acoustic, a 1934 National Steel and a 1940s National resophonic guitar.

=== Death ===
Campbell married the actress Yolande Dolly Fox in 1990 with whom he had one daughter, Paris Campbell.

On June 13, 1993, Campbell died from a heart attack at his home in Manhattan.

== Album discography ==
- 1975: Street Suite (Sync)
- 1988: A Man And His Blues (Cross Cut)
- 1991: One Believer (Elektra)
- 1993: Howlin Mercy (Elektra)
- 2000: Tyler, Texas Session (Sphere Sound)

== See also ==
- Delta blues
