= Miss America 1951 =

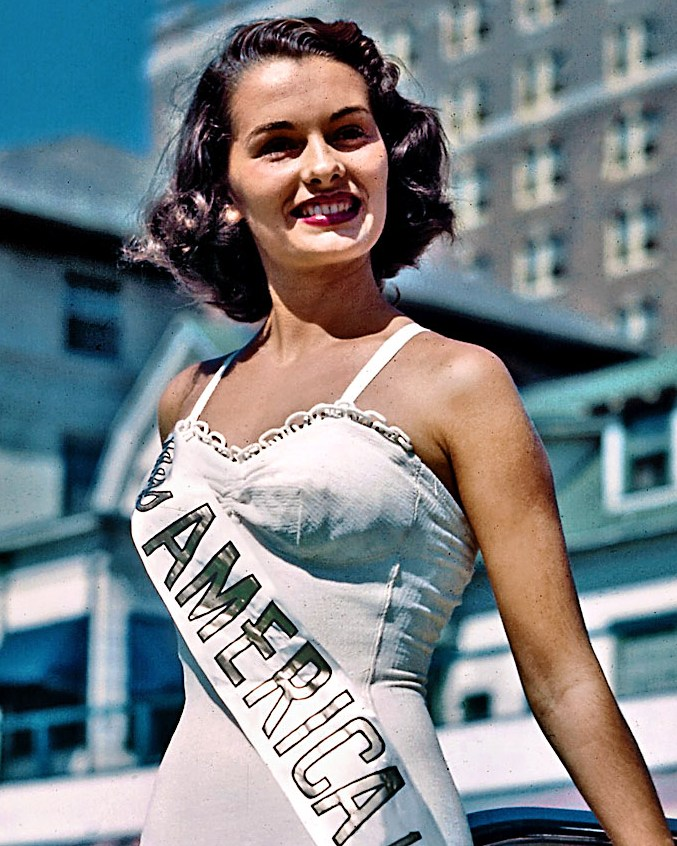
- Yolande Betbeze, Miss America 1951
- Date: September 9, 1950
- Presenters: Bob Russell
- Venue: Boardwalk Hall, Atlantic City, New Jersey
- Entrants: 54
- Placements: 16
- Winner: Yolande Betbeze; Alabama

Miss America 1951, the 24th Miss America pageant, was held at Boardwalk Hall in Atlantic City, New Jersey on September 9, 1950. Traditionally, since a majority of Miss America's reign occurred during the year following her coronation, the pageant referred to her title with the upcoming year. Thus, Yolande Betbeze, who was crowned in September 1950, was called Miss America 1951. This practice continued until 2006, when pageant activities moved from September to January. From that point, the title year aligned with the year in which the titleholder won. This change also occurred recently in 2024, and it marked the transition from Atlantic City, the pageant's long-time base, to its new home in Las Vegas, Nevada.

== Results ==
=== Placements ===
Placement	Contestant
Miss America 1951	Alabama – Yolande Betbeze
1st Runner-Up	South Dakota – Irene O’Connor
2nd Runner-Up	Florida – Jane Ruth Crockett
3rd Runner-Up	Arkansas – Mary Jennings
4th Runner-Up	Oklahoma – Louise O’Brien
Top 16	California – Joanne Durant; Chicago – Marjorie H. Adams; Connecticut – Renee Dianne Roy; District of Columbia – Sandra Joanne Stahl; Greater Philadelphia – Katherine Kennedy; Nevada – Tosca Carolyn Masini; New Jersey – June Elizabeth Stephens; New York City – Phyllis Anita Battleson; North Carolina – Carolyn Edwards; Texas – Margaret Sue Sommers; Washington – Karlyne LaRae Abele

=== Awards ===
==== Preliminary awards ====
Awards	Contestant
Lifestyle and Fitness	Alabama - Yolande Betbeze; Arkansas - Mary Jennings; California – Joanne Durant
Talent	South Dakota - Irene O'Conner; Connecticut - Renee Dianne Roy; District of Columbia - Sandra Joanne Stahl

==== Other awards ====
Awards	Contestant
Miss Congeniality	Hawaii - Dell'finn Kalaupaona Poaha

== Contestants ==
Title	Name	Hometown	Age	Talent	Placement	Awards	Notes
Alabama	Yolande Betbeze	Mobile	21	Classical Vocal, "Caro Nome" from Rigoletto	Winner	Preliminary Lifestyle and Fitness Award	Betbeze's refusal to pose in a swimsuit after her win lead to the pull-out of swimsuit sponsor Catalina & ultimately the creation of the Miss USA pageant
Alaska	Maxine Cothern	Fairbanks		Speech, "Alaska"			
Arizona	Kathryn Lunsford	Phoenix		Modern Dance			
Arkansas	Mary Jennings	Hot Springs		Classical Vocal, "Un Bel Dì" from Madama Butterfly	3rd Runner-up	Preliminary Lifestyle and Fitness Award	Was a featured soprano with the New York City Opera Judged the Miss America 1989 and Miss America 1991 pageants
California	Joanne Durant	San Diego		Vocal/Poetry Recitation, "Alice Blue Gown"	Top 16	Preliminary Lifestyle and Fitness Award	
Canada	Margaret Eleanore Bradford	Windsor					
Chicago	Marjorie Adams	Chicago		Monologue, "To the Lovely Margaret"	Top 16		
Colorado	Barbara Norrish	Longmont		Violin			
Connecticut	Renee Roy	Hartford		Comedy Sketch of a Cosmetic Demonstration and Vocal/Dance, "Charley, My Boy"	Top 16	Preliminary Talent Award	Later Miss New York City USA 1954
Delaware	Lorna Edwardson	Dover		Classical Vocal, "Un Bel Dì" from Madama Butterfly			
(Washington, D.C.) District of Columbia	Sandra Stahl		21	Classical Vocal, "The Bell Song" from Lakmé	Top 16	Preliminary Talent Award	
Florida	Janet Ruth Crockett	St. Petersburg		Vocal & Pantomime from The Perils of Pauline	2nd Runner-up		
(Georgia (U.S. state)) Georgia	Louise Thomas	Fitzgerald					
Greater Philadelphia	Katherine Kennedy	Philadelphia		Classical Vocal, '''O Don Fatale" from Don Carlos	Top 16		
Hawaii	Dell'Finn Kala'upaona Po'aha	Honolulu				Miss Congeniality	
Idaho	Barbara Norton	Burley		Vocal, "A Heart That's Free" from Two Weeks with Love			
Illinois	Catherine Kleinschmidt	Granite City		Vocal, "Come to the Fair"			
Indiana	Pat Berry	Indianapolis		Vocal, "I'm Falling in Love with Someone" from Naughty Marietta			
Iowa	Mary Virginia Lines	Clarinda	18	Piano/Marimba, "Stardust"			
Kansas	Anabel Baker	Wichita		Dramatic Monologue from Macbeth			
Kentucky	Mary Louise Osborne	Wheelwright		Drama			
Louisiana	Rowena Taliaferro	Winnsboro					
Maine	Jane Harragan	Millinocket		Dramatic Monologue, "The Corn is Green"			
Maryland	Ann Uri	Baltimore		Vocal/Piano			
Massachusetts	Britta Berg	Boston					
Michigan	Bette Lou Pittman	Owosso		Monologue, "I Like Americans"			
Minnesota	Jeanne Traun	Minneapolis		Vocal			
Mississippi	Annie Roberts	Hattiesburg					
Missouri	Beverly Rotroff	Kansas City		Vocal/Piano			
Montana	Donna Marie Buls	Missoula					
Nebraska	Jinx Burrus	Crete		Baton Twirling			
Nevada	Tosca Masini	Sparks		Comedy Characterization	Top 16		
New Hampshire	Betty Laurie	Concord					
New Jersey	June Stephens	Ship Bottom		Comic Sketch, "The Older Set"	Top 16		
New Mexico	Martha Rose Wilson	Santa Fe					
(New York (state)) New York	Marilyn Reynolds	Syracuse		Vocal, "I'll Take Romance"			
New York City	Phyllis Battleson	New York City		Classical Vocal, "Mon cœur s'ouvre à ta voix"	Top 16		
North Carolina	Carolyn Edwards	Leaksville		Monologue, "Rumba" by Dorothy Parker	Top 16		
North Dakota	Joan Teets	Minot		Comedy Monologue, "Touch of Norway"		Non-finalist Talent Award	
Ohio	Irene Farren	Grand River		Fashion Design			
Oklahoma	Louise O'Brien	Tulsa		Vocal, "'Twas Only an Irishman's Dream"	4th Runner-up		
Oregon	Elizabeth Ann Baker	Monmouth		Classical Piano, Clair de Lune			
Pennsylvania	Emilie Longacre	Phoenixville		Vocal, "You're My Everything"			
Puerto Rico	Evangelina Moragón						
South Carolina	Carolyn Fowler	Lyman	17	Vocal, "Why Don't You Fall in Love with Me"			
South Dakota	Irene O'Connor	Burbank		Dramatic Monologue, "Dedication of the White Armor" from Saint Joan	1st Runner-up	Preliminary Talent Award	
Tennessee	Greta Graham	Memphis		Organ, "Tico-Tico no Fubá"			
Texas	Margaret Sommers	Dallas		Classical Vocal, "Jealousy"	Top 16		
Utah	Joanne Hinard	Provo		East Indian Dance			
Vermont	Eleanor Kangas	Springfield					
Virginia	Gloria Fenderson	Petersburg					
(Washington (state)) Washington	Karlyne Abele	Des Moines		Dramatic Reading, "The Flag"	Top 16		
Wisconsin	Gloria Lange	Milwaukee	20	Operatic Vocal, "Donkey Serenade" from The Firefly			
Wyoming	Lenore Hoffman	Cheyenne					
