= Americans Abroad!!! Against Me!!! Live in London!!! =

Live album by Against Me!
- Released: August 22, 2006
- Recorded: March 21, 2006
- Venue: Mean Fiddler, London
- Genre: Punk rock
- Length: 52:29
- Label: Fat Wreck Chords

Against Me! chronology
Searching for a Former Clarity (2005)	Americans Abroad!!! Against Me!!! Live in London!!! (2006)	New Wave (2007)

Professional ratings
Review scores
Source	Rating
Allmusic	4.5/5 stars

Americans Abroad!!! Against Me!!! Live in London!!! is Against Me!'s first live album, released on Fat Wreck Chords even though the band was signed to Sire Records at the time. It was recorded on March 21, 2006, at the Mean Fiddler venue in London, England. The band played songs stretching as far back as their 2001 The Acoustic EP, all the way to their 2005 album Searching for a Former Clarity. The album also features the previously unreleased track, Americans Abroad, which would go on to be recorded for their 2007 album New Wave. The disc also features a music video for the song 'Problems' as a multi-media track. It is Against Me!'s final release on Fat Wreck Chords before their major label debut on Sire Records.

Laura Jane Grace isn't a fan of this release, stating in 2015 "To be honest, to get into it with the old live record, it always bummed me out, You put that record on and the first song on it, 'The Energizer,' it's so drag-ass slow. It made me so sad every time I heard it. Warren, who played drums with us then, had real tempo issues, and Atom, is a better drummer. I'm not judging them morally as people, just saying musicianship-wise..."

== Track listing ==
All lyrics are written by Laura Jane Grace; all music is composed by Grace, James Bowman, Andrew Seward, and Warren Oakes, except where noted.

No.	Title	Music	Length
1.	"A Brief Yet Triumphant Introduction"		1:41
2.	"From Her Lips to God's Ears (The Energizer)"		2:38
3.	"Rice and Bread"		2:18
4.	"Reinventing Axl Rose" (music by Grace)		2:20
5.	"Americans Abroad"		2:36
6.	"Those Anarcho Punks Are Mysterious..." (music by Grace)		2:39
7.	"Miami"		3:42
8.	"Don't Lose Touch"		3:12
9.	"Unprotected Sex with Multiple Partners"		4:25
10.	"Sink, Florida, Sink"	Grace, Bowman, Seward, Oakes	2:28
11.	"You Look Like I Need a Drink"		2:37
12.	"Turn Those Clapping Hands Into Angry Balled Fists"		5:48
13.	"T.S.R."		2:23
14.	"Problems"		2:33
15.	"Pints of Guinness Make You Strong" (music by Grace)		3:56
16.	"Cliché Guevara"		3:14
17.	"We Laugh at Danger (And Break All the Rules)" (music by Grace)		3:57

== Personnel ==
Band

- Laura Jane Grace – guitar, lead vocals
- James Bowman – guitar, backing vocals
- Andrew Seward – bass guitar, backing vocals
- Warren Oakes – drums

Production

- Will Shapland – recording engineer
- J. Robbins – assistant engineer, mixing
- Chris Goddard – assistant engineer
- Joe Clark – assistant engineer
- Alan Douches – mastering
- Jason Munn – design
- Pat Graham – photography
