= Kids in America (disambiguation) =

"Kids in America" is a 1981 song by Kim Wilde.

Kids in America may also refer to:

- Children and adolescents in the United States
- Kids in America (album), a 2003 album by American Juniors participants
- Kids in America (film), a 2005 independent film
- Kids in America, a pre-release name for the 2011 film Take Me Home Tonight
