= Road Between =

Studio album by Lucy Hale
- Released: June 3, 2014
- Recorded: 2012–2013
- Genre: Country pop
- Length: 39:35
- Labels: Hollywood; DMG Nashville
- Producers: Mike Daly; Mark Bright

Singles from Road Between
- 1. "You Sound Good to Me" Released: January 7, 2014; 2. "Lie a Little Better" Released: July 21, 2014

Road Between is the only studio album by American singer Lucy Hale. The album was released on June 3, 2014, by Hollywood Records and DMG Nashville.

== Background ==
On June 12, 2012, Hale announced she had signed a record deal with Hollywood Records (co-partnership with DMG Nashville). The album is a country album, which was recorded through late 2012 and mid 2013, during Hale's schedule filming her television series Pretty Little Liars. On March 31, 2014, Road Between was unveiled due to a fan contest to reveal the album's cover art. A web series titled The Road Between with Lucy Hale, which consisted of four episodes, released from July 25 to August 6, 2014, on the CMT website. It follows the journey of Hale, visiting her hometown of Memphis, Tennessee and on set with the filming of the music video for the song "Lie a Little Better". In 2016, New Zealand singer-songwriter Kaylee Bell released a cover of album track "That's What I Call Crazy" as a standalone single.

== Singles ==
The lead single "You Sound Good to Me" was released on January 7, 2014. A music video was directed by Philip Andelman, is about Hale going on a road trip with her friends and arriving at a late-night bonfire.

The second and final single, "Lie a Little Better" was released on July 21, 2014. Hale explained the song is about her love crush with actor Drew Van Acker. It debuted at No. 60 on the Billboard Country Airplay chart for the week ending on July 30, 2014.

== Cancelled tour ==
In December 2014, Hale was originally set to embark on The Road Between Tour in spring 2015, to promote the album. However, she later announced the tour was cancelled shortly before it was slated to begin citing vocal issues as the reason.

== Critical reception ==
Professional ratings
Review scores
Source	Rating
AllMusic	3.5/5 stars
Country Weekly	C+
Billboard	83/100
Roughstock	3.5/5 stars

Road Between was met with mostly positive reception from music critics. At AllMusic, Stephen Thomas Erlewine rated the album three-and-a-half stars out of five, remarking how the music on the release "is irrepressibly charming commercial pop" that "is better when it's lighter", and the music sounds like "pristine pop, thanks in large part to Hale's crisp, chipper delivery." Mike Ayers of Billboard rated the album an 83 out of 100, indicating how the release "is filled with powerful, catchy choruses and moments that display Hale's voice in many different ways." At Roughstock, Matt Bjorke rated the album three-and-a-half stars out of five, writing how the music on the release is not going to be everyone's cup-of-tea, yet it evidences her potential in country music because according to him that is "where she's always wanted to be." Bob Paxman of Country Weekly graded the album a C+, noting how some songs don't work out well for her voice and "Like most contemporary records, the production sounds overly busy and much too polished, stripping away all semblance of real emotion." Yet, Paxman says "for the target audience, namely young females, Lucy and her material should resonate and find its target", but eventually "she may be able to reach a broader base, because the potential is definitely there."

== Track listing ==
No.	Title	Writer(s)	Producer(s)	Length
1.	"You Sound Good to Me"	Ashley Gorley; Luke Laird; Hillary Lindsey	Mike Daly	3:12
2.	"From the Backseat"	Daly; Jimmy Robbins; Nicolle Galyon	Daly	3:08
3.	"Nervous Girls"	Lindsey; Tom Douglas; James Slater	Daly	4:04
4.	"Red Dress" (duet with Joe Nichols)	Todd Sherman Clark; Jessica Lee Mitchell	Mark Bright	4:39
5.	"Goodbye Gone"	J. T. Harding; Melissa Peirce; Andy Dodd	Bright	2:57
6.	"Kiss Me"	Daly; Gorley; Chris DeStefano; Lindy Robbins	Bright	3:13
7.	"Road Between"	Daly; Peirce	Daly	3:33
8.	"Lie a Little Better"	Daly; DeStefano; Peirce	Bright	3:43
9.	"That's What I Call Crazy"	DeStefano; Gorley; Kacey Musgraves	Bright	3:26
10.	"Love Tonight"	Lucie Silvas; Jeremy Spillman; Jonathan Ian Green	Bright	3:15
11.	"Just Another Song"	Daly; Lucy Hale; Catt Gravitt	Bright	4:25
Total length:				39:35

Road Between – Walmart edition (bonus track)
No.	Title	Writer(s)	Producer(s)	Length
12.	"Come On"	Kurt Allison; Vicky McGehee; Brian Davis	Bright	3:16
Total length:				42:51

Road Between – Deluxe edition (bonus tracks)
No.	Title	Writer(s)	Producer(s)	Length
12.	"My Little Black Wedding Dress"	Daly; Trey Bruce	Daly	3:25
13.	"Feels Like Home"	Hale; Daly; Kristian Bush	Bright	4:05
14.	"Loved"	Hale; Brett James; Caitlyn Smith	Bright	3:42
15.	"Kiss Me" (Live Acoustic)	Daly; Gorley; DeStefano; Robbins	Daly	3:13
16.	"Road Between" (Live Acoustic)	Daly; Peirce	Daly	3:39
Total length:				57:39

Road Between – United States limited digital deluxe edition (bonus track)
No.	Title	Writer(s)	Producer(s)	Length
17.	"Runaway Circus"	Jenn Schott; Jason Saenz	Bright	3:09
Total length:				60:48

Road Between – Target exclusive deluxe edition (bonus track)
No.	Title	Writer(s)	Producer(s)	Length
18.	"Those Three Words"	Lindsay Ell; Jon Nite; Robbins	Bright	3:09
Total length:				63:57

== Personnel ==
- Lucy Hale – vocals
- Charlie Judge – Hammond B3 organ (1, 12), programming (1–3, 7), keyboards (2–11, 13, 14, 17, 18), strings (11), string arrangements and composing (11)
- Jimmy Nichols – Wurlitzer electric piano (1), acoustic piano (2–8, 10–14, 17, 18), Hammond B3 organ (3), celesta (3), strings (7)
- F. Reid Shippen – programming (4–6, 8–11, 13, 14, 17, 18), percussion (4–6, 8–11, 13, 14, 17, 18)
- Jerry McPherson – electric guitars (1–14, 17, 18), slide guitar (1)
- Ilya Toshinsky –ukulele (1, 7), acoustic guitars (2–6, 8–14, 17, 18), mandolin (7, 9, 12, 14)
- Tom Bukovac – electric guitars (4, 11, 13, 14)
- Paul Franklin – steel guitar (2, 3, 7, 12)
- Mike Johnson – steel guitar (9, 18)
- Kristian Bush – bouzouki (13), backing vocals (13)
- Jimmie Lee Sloas – bass (1–14, 17, 18)
- Shannon Forrest – drums (1–5, 7, 11–14)
- Chris McHugh – drums (6, 8–10, 17, 18)
- Eric Darken – percussion (1–14, 17, 18)
- Jonathan Yudkin – fiddle (1), mandolin (2), cello (7, 12)
- Aubrey Haynie – fiddle (6)
- Bob Bailey – backing vocals (1)
- Mike Daly – backing vocals (1)
- Jake "Fancy" Hagood – backing vocals (1)
- Vicki Hampton – backing vocals (1)
- Rachel Reinert – backing vocals (1, 3)
- Kim Keyes – backing vocals (2, 4, 7, 12)
- Gene Miller – backing vocals (2)
- Joe Nichols – vocals (4)
- Wes Hightower – backing vocals (4, 11, 13)
- Jenifer Wrinkle – backing vocals (4–6, 8, 9, 11, 13, 18)
- Perry Coleman – backing vocals (5, 6, 8–10, 17, 18)
- Sarah Buxton – backing vocals (10)
- Lucie Silvas – backing vocals (10)
- Brett James – backing vocals (14)
- Caitlyn Smith – backing vocals (14)
- Jennifer Schott – backing vocals (17)

Acoustic Live (Tracks 15 & 16)

- Lucy Hale – lead vocals
- Scotty Alexander – guitar, backing vocals
- Lance Konnerth – guitar, backing vocals
- Craig Macintyre – percussion

== Production ==
- Mike Daly – A&R
- Kirsten Wines – A&R (for Mark Bright)
- Ed Reyes – A&R coordinator
- Mike "Frog" Griffith – production coordinator
- Dave Snow – creative director
- Enny Joo – art direction, design
- Sasha Eisenman – photography
- Elissa Leeds for Reel Talent Management, Inc. – management

Technical

- Adam Ayan – mastering at Gateway Mastering (Portland, Maine)
- Steve Marcantonio – recording (1–3, 7, 12, 15, 16)
- Derek Bason – recording (4–6, 8–11, 13, 14, 17, 18), digital editing (4–6, 8–11, 13, 14, 17, 18)
- Ben Fowler – recording (4–6, 8–11, 13, 14, 17, 18), mixing (4)
- Todd Tidwell – recording (4–6, 8–11, 13, 14, 17, 18)
- Serban Ghenea – mixing (1)
- Justin Niebank – mixing (2, 3, 7, 12)
- F. Reid Shippen – mixing (5, 6, 8–11, 13, 14, 17, 18)
- Brian Malouf – mixing (15, 16)
- John Hanes – mix engineer (15, 16)
- Seth Morton – recording assistant (1–3, 7, 12)
- Chris Ashburn – recording assistant (4–6, 8–11, 13, 14, 17, 18)
- Chris Small – recording assistant (4–6, 8–11, 13, 14, 17, 18)
- Ernesto Olvera – recording assistant (15, 16)
- Drew Bollman – mix assistant (2, 3, 7, 12)
- Paul "Paco" Cossette – mix assistant (4–6, 8–11, 13, 14, 17, 18)
- David Huff – digital editing (1–3, 7, 12, 15, 16)
- Sean Neff – digital editing
- Tony Castle – digital editing (4–6, 8–11, 13, 14, 17, 18)

== Charts ==
The album debuted on the Billboard 200 at No. 14 and No. 4 on the Top Country Albums chart with 18,000 copies sold in the US during its first week. The album has sold 44,000 copies in the US as of August 2014.

Chart (2014)	Peak position
Australian Albums (ARIA)	57
Canadian Albums (Billboard)	13
US Billboard 200	14
US Top Country Albums (Billboard)	4

== Release history ==
Region	Date	Label	Ref.
United States	June 3, 2014	Hollywood; DMG Nashville	
New Zealand	June 6, 2014	Hollywood; DMG Nashville	
