= Ian Harding =

American actor (born 1986)

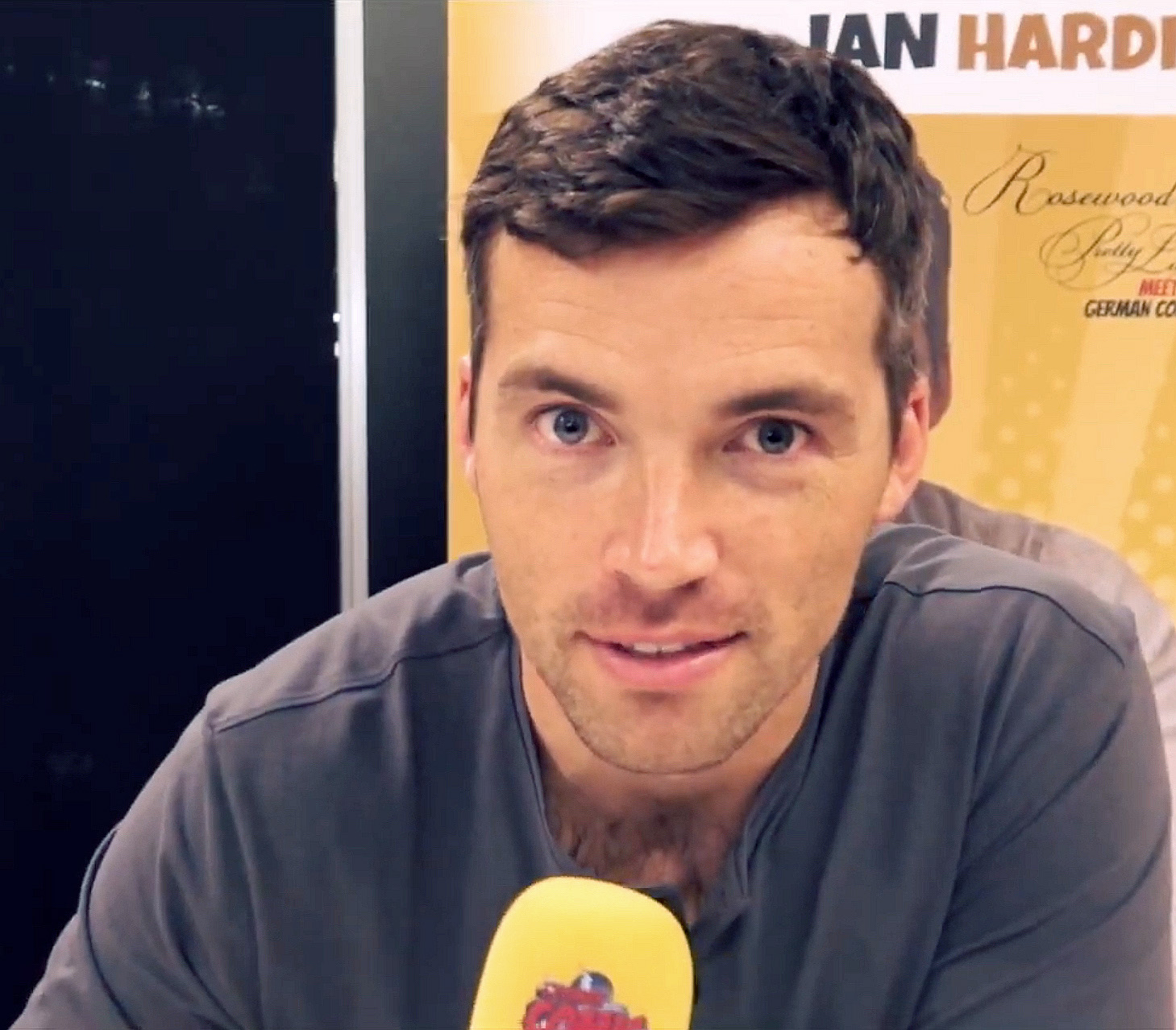
- Harding in 2019
- Born: Ian Michael Harding; September 16, 1986 (age 40); Heidelberg, West Germany
- Education: Carnegie Mellon University (BFA)
- Occupation: Actor
- Years active: 2009–present
- Spouse: Sophie Hart (m. 2019)
- Children: 1

Ian Michael Harding is an American actor. He is best known for his role as Ezra Fitz in the Freeform mystery drama series Pretty Little Liars (2010–2017).

== Early life and career ==
Ian Michael Harding was born on September 16, 1986, in Heidelberg, West Germany, to an American military family. His family moved to Virginia a few years later, where he joined the drama club at his high school, Georgetown Preparatory School in North Bethesda, Maryland. He later graduated with a Bachelor of Fine Arts from Carnegie Mellon University.

Harding was cast as Ezra Fitz, the love interest of Aria Montgomery (Lucy Hale) on the Freeform mystery drama Pretty Little Liars, based on Sara Shepard's book series of the same name. The series ran from June 8, 2010, to June 27, 2017. Harding won seven Teen Choice Awards for his role.

== Personal life ==
Harding married Sophie Hart in 2019. Their first child, a son, was born in September 2022.

Harding has been working with the Lupus Foundation of America to raise funds and awareness for lupus research and education to support his mother, who has been living with lupus for more than 20 years.

== Filmography ==
=== Film ===
Year	Title	Role	Notes
2009	Adventureland	Wealthy Prepster	
2010	Love & Other Drugs	Pfizer Trainee #1	Uncredited
2011	Deadtime Stories: Volume 2	Ryan	
2015	Addiction: A 60s Love Story	Max Bornstein	Also known as Dynamite: A Cautionary Tale
2016	Super Novas	Alex	
2017	People You May Know	Phillip	
2018	Office Uprising	Nicholas Frohm	
2019	Ford v Ferrari	Ford Executive Ian	
2022	The Hater	Brent	
2024	Our Little Secret	Logan	
2026	The 12 Dates of Christmas	Peter Grant	

=== Television ===
Year	Title	Role	Notes
2010	NCIS: Los Angeles	Curtis Lacross	Episode: "The Bank Job"
2010–2017	Pretty Little Liars	Ezra Fitz	Main role
2012	Punk'd	Himself	Episode: "Lucy Hale"
2012	I'm Not a DJ	Matt	Television film
2016	Break: The Musical	Rockstar	Episode: "Break (I've Been Waiting For)"
2017	Flip the Script	The Producer	Miniseries
2017	Thin Ice	Andrew	Unaired television series
2019	Chicago Med	Phillip Davis	Recurring role, 11 episodes
2020	Kipo and the Age of Wonderbeasts	Harris	Voice only, 3 episodes
2021	Magnum P.I.	Aiden Walker	Episode: "Til Death"
2022	Long Slow Exhale	Eddie Hagan	12 episodes
2022	Ghosts of Christmas Always	Peter Baron	Television film
2024	The Magic of Lemon Drops	Rory	Television film
2025	Ripple	Nate	Main role; 8 episodes
2026	Lost in Paradise	Max	TV film

=== Web ===
Year	Title	Role	Notes
2010	Hollywood is Like High School with Money	Jamie Hunter	Recurring role; 5 episodes

=== Music videos ===
Year	Title	Artist	Role	Ref.
2016	"Where's the Love?"	Black Eyed Peas featuring The World	Himself	

== Awards and nominations ==
Year	Award	Category	Work	Result	Refs.
2010	Teen Choice Awards	Choice Summer TV Star – Male	Pretty Little Liars	Won	
2011	Teen Choice Awards	Choice Summer TV Star – Male	Pretty Little Liars	Won	
2011	Youth Rock Awards	Rockin' Actor – TV	Pretty Little Liars	Won	
2012	Teen Choice Awards	Choice TV Actor: Drama	Pretty Little Liars	Won	
2013	Teen Choice Awards	Choice TV Actor: Drama	Pretty Little Liars	Won	
2014	Teen Choice Awards	Choice TV Actor: Drama	Pretty Little Liars	Won	
2015	Teen Choice Awards	Choice TV Actor: Drama	Pretty Little Liars	Won	
2016	Teen Choice Awards	Choice TV Actor: Drama	Pretty Little Liars	Won	
2017	Teen Choice Awards	Choice TV Actor: Drama	Pretty Little Liars	Nominated	
