= You Sound Good to Me =

Single by Lucy Hale

from the album Road Between
- Released: January 7, 2014
- Genre: Country
- Length: 3:12
- Label: Hollywood; DMG Nashville
- Songwriters: Ashley Gorley; Luke Laird; Hillary Lindsey
- Producer: Mike Daly

Lucy Hale singles chronology
"Bless Myself" (2011)	"You Sound Good to Me" (2014)	"Lie a Little Better" (2014)

Music video
- "You Sound Good to Me" on YouTube

"You Sound Good to Me" is a song recorded by American country singer Lucy Hale. It was written by Ashley Gorley, Luke Laird, and Hillary Lindsey and was produced by Mike Daly. The song was released to digital retailers on January 7, 2014 by Hollywood Records and DMG Nashville, as the lead single from Hale's debut studio album Road Between (2014).

The song was generally well received by critics, praising its unique country pop sound, particularly in contrast to the teen pop of contemporary actresses-turned-singers on the Hollywood Records label. "You Sound Good to Me" peaked at numbers 21 and 47 on both the Billboard Hot Country Songs and Country Airplay charts respectively. It also charted at number 88 on the Hot 100. It achieved similar chart success in Canada, peaking at number 57 on the Canadian Hot 100.

An accompanying music video for the song directed by Philip Andelman and features Hale hanging out with her friends on a road trip.

== Critical reception ==
Upon its release, "You Sound Good to Me" was met with mostly positive reviews. Markos Papadatos of Digital Journal suggested the song made Hale's future in country music look "promising", awarding the song a 4.5-star (out of 5) rating. Sam Lansky of Idolator similarly complimented the song as a strong debut that "bodes very well" for the associated album, and proposed that it could be a hit at country radio, owing to its "attitude" and "big singalong chorus". Matt Bjorke of Roughstock gave a glowing review, describing "You Sound Good to Me" as well written and strongly performed, while also highlighting Hale's "powerful" voice. "She's not another confection of some machine, Bjorke concludes, "She’s [sic] genuinely talented and “You Sound Good To Me” proves it." The blog, too, rated the song 4.5 stars out of 5. Selecting it as a "Critic's Pick", Taste of Country contributor Billy Dukes called the song "too much fun to brush aside", and noted that Hale "[shines] as a vocalist" on the track in spite of an arrangement not designed to showcase vocals.

== Music video ==
The music video premiered on January 7, 2014 on ABC Family, during the television series Pretty Little Liars (also stars Hale). Directed by Philip Andelman, the video features Hale going on a road trip with her friends and arriving at a late-night bonfire. It ends with her giving a kiss to one of her male friends.

== Live performances ==
Lucy Hale performed this song on Good Morning America on January 10, 2014 and later on Live with Kelly and Michael on January 14. The same month, Hale also performed the song's acoustic version on the Vevo Lift Live Sessions.

== Charts ==
Chart performance for "You Sound Good to Me"
Chart (2014)	Peak position
Canada Hot 100 (Billboard)	57
US Billboard Hot 100	88
US Country Airplay (Billboard)	47
US Hot Country Songs (Billboard)	21
