= The Hater (2022 film) =

2022 American film by Joey Ally

- Theatrical release poster
- Directed by: Joey Ally
- Written by: Joey Ally
- Story by: Joey Ally; TJ Williams, Jr.
- Produced by: Thomas Benski; Tory Lenosky; Adrienne Childress; Daniel Crown; Angeline J. Sanfilippo
- Starring: Joey Ally; Bruce Dern; Meredith Hagner; D'Angelo Lacy; Ali Larter; Ian Harding; Nora Dunn
- Cinematography: TJ Williams, Jr.
- Edited by: Josie Azzam
- Music by: Benjamin Jaffe
- Production companies: Red Crown Productions; Monarch Pictures; Pulse Films
- Distributed by: Vertical Entertainment
- Release date: March 18, 2022
- Running time: 108 minutes
- Country: United States
- Language: English

The Hater is a 2022 American political satire film written and directed by Joey Ally in her feature debut. Ally stars alongside Bruce Dern, Meredith Hagner, D'Angelo Lacy, Ali Larter, Ian Harding, and Nora Dunn. The plot follows a liberal speechwriter who goes undercover as a Republican to defeat her conservative childhood nemesis and to lose him the Texas primary nomination. The film was released in the United States on March 18, 2022, by Vertical Entertainment. It received generally positive reviews from critics.

== Plot ==
As a child, Dorothy Goodwin loses the class presidency year after year to jokester Brent Hart, the son of a Senator.

As an adult, Dorothy is a liberal environmentalist. She is arrested and bailed out of jail after unintentionally burning the U.S. flag. As a result, she loses her job as a speechwriter on a U.S. Senate campaign. Dorothy returns to her conservative Texas hometown of Alabaster to live with her grandfather, Frank. After learning Brent is running for the state legislature against Democrat Sally Jensen, who has already lost three times before, Dorothy creates an elaborate scheme to make him lose. Based on real American law, she plans to go undercover as his opponent on the Republican ticket, win the primary nomination, and drop out before the midterms to force a victory for Sally.

While talking with her best friend Glenn over the phone, Dorothy accidentally disarms a thief robbing a convenience station. She is called a hero on the news. Her high school friend Greta, who opposes Brent because he plans to tear down the community center where she works and build a Ford dealership, serves as Dorothy's campaign manager and arranges a press tour using her connections in Alabaster. To win, Dorothy has to dodge questions, but promises herself she will never "lie," about Republican policies she dislikes, such as the right to bear arms. The town matriarch, Genie, sponsors her campaign. Glenn visits Dorothy from Washington and gives her a make-over.

Dorothy grows closer to her grandfather, who starts to promote her campaign. Dorothy is criticized on the news when she takes a pregnant Greta to a Planned Parenthood health clinic. Greta publicly declares she is pro-choice, which damages the campaign. Privately, Brent tells Dorothy that he once drove his college girlfriend to have an abortion. He also apologizes for his actions as a child. Dorothy encourages him to do the right thing now, moving forward, assuming he has bested her and will win the ticket.

The next day, Brent - moved by Dorothy's vulnerability, and integrity, and convinced she really would make a better State Senator than he - announces the withdrawal of his candidacy. At the Alabaster Community Center, Sally tells Dorothy that she leaked the news of Greta's abortion because she is, in fact, anti-abortion. Sally details her plan to release the video of Dorothy's arrest after she accepts the Republican nomination. Shocked, Dorothy takes Greta outside and tells her the truth about her run for office. Greta is initially critical but understanding. Dorothy decides to help Greta run against her as an independent. In September 2020, two months before the election, Greta is ahead in the polls.

== Cast ==
- Joey Ally as Dorothy, a liberal running as a Republican in Texas
  - Elizabeth Kankiewicz as young Dorothy
- Bruce Dern as Frank, a veteran and Dorothy's grandfather
- Meredith Hagner as Greta, Dorothy's high school friend and campaign manager
- D'Angelo Lacy as Glenn, Dorothy's best friend from Washington
- Ali Larter as Victoria, a news reporter and Greta's friend
- Ian Harding as Brent, a Republican running for the state legislature in Texas
  - Wesley Kimmel as young Brent
- Nora Dunn as Genie, the chair of the Women's Chamber of Commerce
- Melora Walters as Sally Jensen, a Democrat running for the state legislature in Texas

== Release ==
On February 18, 2022, Vertical Entertainment acquired the film's distribution rights. The film was released in the United States on March 18, 2022.

== Reception ==
On Rotten Tomatoes, the film holds an approval rating of 86% based on 7 reviews, with an average rating of 6.50/10.

Critics praised The Hater for its performances, comedy, and deft handling of complex themes of contemporary America. Tim Cogshell of KPCC's "FilmWeek with Larry Mantle" said, "This movie manages to do correctly what a film like Don't Look Up did so badly, which is to have a political point of view and believe in it while knowing that not everyone on your side of the camp is great while not everyone on the other side is evil." The Hater was also recommended on KPCC's FilmWeek Marquee.

Benjamin Franz of Film Threat wrote, "Generally, I found The Hater charming and lovable. If you're looking for a Capra-esque satire to take your mind off the crazy clown world demonstrated by national politics, seek this out. It will be a wonderful investment of your time."

Nine female journalists from The Alliance of Women Film Journalists listed it as their "Movie of the Week". For the AWFJ, Loren King wrote, "A political comedy that’s smart, empathetic, funny and aces the Bechdel test and then some? Welcome to The Hater." Liz Whittemore said, "Through moral ambiguity and a whole lot of laughs, I loved every minute of this film." Jennifer Merin wrote, "If we need an UP at the moment, Joey Ally’s charming first feature fits the bill."

Sandie Angula Chen said The Hater "highlights Ally's expressive performance, comic timing, and observational humor. Looking forward to her next project." Movie Nation's Roger Moore said the "cleverest thing about The Hater is the way it upends expectations just enough to keep things interesting and make you wonder 'How will Ally write her way out of this?' And then Ally manages just that."

In a negative review, Peter Sobczynski wrote for RogerEbert.com, "Aside from a couple of good moments from Hagner and the always reliable Dern, The Hater is a mess that's bereft of laughs, ideologically suspect, and tedious from start to finish."
