= Jackson Harris =

American pop singer

- Born: New York City, United States
- Genres: Pop, teen pop
- Occupations: Singer-songwriter, musician
- Instruments: Vocals, guitar
- Years active: 2010–present
- Label: 77 East Records (2010–present)

Jackson Harris is an American pop singer. He is known for his single, "Life Through a Lens", which peaked at number 20 in Billboard Twitter Emerging Artists chart.

== Early life ==
Harris was born in New York City, United States, and attended Riverdale Country School. He began singing as a child and performed at many school plays.

== Career ==
=== 2010: Career beginnings and Long Story Short ===
Harris recorded a cover version of Jay-Z and Alicia Keys's hit "Empire State of Mind". A video was added to YouTube on March 24, 2010, and has received over 200,000 views. Harris then recorded his debut EP "Long Story Short". The video for "Long Story Short" was uploaded on YouTube and stars Judah Friedlander.

=== 2011: Go Crazy ===
On August 16, 2011, he released a new single called "Go Crazy" a pop/dance song, on by 77 East Records. A video was created in Los Angeles with Shay Carl and "ShayTard" family. The video has received over half a million views on his YouTube channel.

=== 2012: Come Back Down to Earth ===
On June 12, 2012, a new single was released on iTunes titled "Come Back Down to Earth". A subsequent video was released starring Pretty Little Liars star Lucy Hale.

=== 2013: Gone in a Heartbeat ===
Harris released his next single, "Gone In a Heartbeat" on July 16, 2013. He often performs the song live while on tour.

=== 2014: Miss Me, Sharks and Vampires and Life Through a Lens ===
Harris's single "Miss Me" was released on January 14, 2014, and is featured on his EP "Sharks And Vampires" which features 8 songs. A video was created in Los Angeles and premiered on OK Magazine. He made a song for friend, Shay Carl's birthday titled "Life Through a Lens". The song peaked at No. 1 on Billboard's Twitter Chart and No. 20 on the Top 100 Chart and a video is featured on the ShayTards YouTube channel with nearly 1 million views.

== Tours ==
Harris has toured the United States extensively with Fifth Harmony and opening for Cher Lloyd. He also performed throughout Europe opening for Cody Simpson on his Acoustic Sessions Tour during the Summer of 2014.

== Discography ==
EPs

- "Long Story Short", 2010
- "Sharks and Vampires", 2014

Singles

- "Life Through a Lens", 2014
- "Miss Me", 2014
- "Gone In a Heartbeat", 2013
- "Come Back Down to Earth", 2012
- "Go Crazy", 2011
- "Long Story Short", 2010

Cover Songs

- "Chocolate", 2014
- "She Looks So Perfect", 2014
- "Anything Could Happen", 2014
- "Stay With Me", 2014
- "Bright Lights", 2014
- "The Man", 2014
- "Demons", 2014
- "Christmas Without You", 2013
- "Kiss Me", 2013
- "Just Keep Breathing", 2013
- "When I Was Your Man", 2013
- "It's Time", 2013
- "All I Want for Christmas", 2012
- "Brofriend" (with Shay Carl), 2012
- "Last Christmas", 2011
- "Empire State of Mind", 2010
