= The 12 Dates of Christmas =

2026 film by David Lipper

- Release poster
- Directed by: David Lipper
- Screenplay by: David Lipper; Seth Howard
- Produced by: David Lipper; Ryan Winterstern; Richard Alan Reid; Michael Philip; Robert A. Daly Jr.; Carter Jenkins
- Starring: Lucy Hale; Ian Harding; Carter Jenkins
- Production companies: Latigo Films; BuzzFeed Studios; Applewood Studios; CaliWood Pictures; Fortitude International
- Distributed by: Hulu
- Release date: November 6, 2026
- Running time: 96 minutes
- Country: United States
- Language: English

The 12 Dates of Christmas is a 2026 American Christmas romantic comedy film directed by David Lipper and starring Lucy Hale and Ian Harding as well as Carter Jenkins.

It premiered on November 6, 2026 on Hulu.

== Premise ==
A career woman who has prioritized her work life over her personal life is persuaded to go on 12 dates in 12 weeks prior to Christmas.

== Cast ==
- Lucy Hale as Christina Walker
- Ian Harding as Peter Grant
- Penelope Ann Miller
- Paul Ben-Victor
- Greer Grammer as Bridget
- Kahyun Kim as Molly
- Kennedy Strickland as Lily
- Chelsea Kater as Lily's Mom

== Production ==
=== Development ===
The film is directed by David Lipper and written by Lipper with Seth Howard. It is produced by Latigo Films, BuzzFeed Studios, Applewood Studios, CaliWood Pictures and Fortitude International. Producer’s on the film include Lipper, Ryan Winterstern, Richard Alan Reid, Michael Philip and Robert A. Daly Jr.

=== Casting ===
The cast is led by Lucy Hale and Ian Harding who joined the film in December 2025, having previously worked together on television series Pretty Little Liars. Penelope Ann Miller, Paul Ben-Victor, Greer Grammer and Kahyun Kim joined the cast in February 2026.

=== Filming ===
Principal photography took place in Clinton, Mississippi with filming locations including the Olde Towne District. The film marks the fourth Lipper made in Clinton, and the seventh in Mississippi since 2022.

== Release ==
The 12 Dates of Christmas premiered on November 6, 2026 on Hulu.
