= White People for Peace =

Single by Against Me!

from the album New Wave
- Released: May 1, 2007
- Recorded: 2006
- Genre: Punk rock
- Length: 6:38
- Label: Sire
- Songwriter(s): Laura Jane Grace
- Producer(s): Butch Vig

Against Me! singles chronology
"From Her Lips to God's Ears (The Energizer)" (2006)	"White People for Peace" (2007)	"Thrash Unreal" (2007)

"White People for Peace" is a protest song by punk band Against Me! released in 2007, containing two new songs: the title track, and "Full Sesh". In the United States, it was pressed on both black and red vinyl, with a reported 4,500 and 500 copies pressed respectively. There was also a UK pressing of the record that was pressed onto white vinyl, limited to 1,000.

The record is available at live shows, on iTunes, or on the band's Myspace page through SNOCAP. "White People For Peace" also appears on Against Me!'s 2007 full-length, New Wave.

In September 2007, a 12" version of the single was available. It features the album version on the A-side and a remix by Butch Vig on the B-side. This song was #65 on Rolling Stone's list of the 100 Best Songs of 2007.

== Track listing ==
1. "White People For Peace" – 3:32
2. "Full Sesh" – 3:06

== Music video ==
The music video features war as a sport involving two teams of soldiers fighting on a football field. Cheerleaders celebrate the violence as the fat cat politician screams for more violence. A lone protester, whose sickly appearance reflects his weak voice in society, is in the same stadium screaming at the events taking place.

The video was directed by Adam Egypt Mortimer and performed by the No Mercy Video Stunt Team.

== See also ==
- List of anti-war songs
