= New Wave (Against Me! album) =

Studio album by Against Me!
- Released: July 10, 2007
- Recorded: October 1 – December 23, 2006
- Studios: Paramount Studios, Hollywood
- Genres: Punk rock; emo
- Length: 33:33
- Label: Sire
- Producer: Butch Vig

Against Me! chronology
Americans Abroad!!! Against Me!!! Live in London!!! (2006)	New Wave (2007)	The Original Cowboy (2009)

Singles from New Wave
- 1. "White People for Peace" Released: May 1, 2007; 2. "Thrash Unreal" Released: October 10, 2007; 3. "Stop!" Released: April 10, 2008; 4. "New Wave" Released: August 5, 2008

Professional ratings
Aggregate scores
Source	Rating
Metacritic	74/100
Review scores
Source	Rating
AbsolutePunk.net	(81%)
AllMusic	4/5 stars
Blender	4/5 stars
IGN Music	(7.8)
Kerrang!	4/5 stars
Okayplayer	3.5/5 stars
Pitchfork	(5.5/10)
Rolling Stone	4/5 stars
Spin	4.5/5 stars

New Wave is the fourth studio album by American punk rock band Against Me! and their debut album on Sire Records. Produced by Butch Vig of Nevermind fame, it was released on July 10, 2007. The album's first single, "White People for Peace", was released in May 2007, prior to the album's release. A second single, "Thrash Unreal", followed in July 2007.

The album was #1 on Spin Magazine's Album of the Year and #9 on Rolling Stone's list of the Top 50 Albums of 2007.

== Production ==
New Wave is the band's first album with major label Sire Records. Some fans responded negatively to the decision, calling them "sell-outs". Singer/guitarist Laura Jane Grace commented on this, saying "It's just kind of a self-defeating, shoot yourself in the foot-like attitude to have. I find it completely frustrating and off-putting and it turns me off of the punk scene really because people are very closed minded."

The album was originally scheduled for release in the spring of 2007, but was delayed due to mixing issues. Mixing was due to start on February 1, 2007 but it was pushed back to February 9. The band had to start touring on the February 20, so they ended up mixing for ten days before they had to leave. While on tour, producer Butch Vig and mixer Rich Costey would email the band a song which they would then listen to and comment back on.

Tegan Quin's collaboration on "Borne on the FM Waves of the Heart" came about on the 2006 Warped Tour when Quin and a friend were interviewing bands for Canadian music television channel MuchMusic. When her friend said he was going to interview Against Me!, Quin, being a fan of the band, requested to do it instead. During the interview, the band mentioned that they were making a new album to which Quin jokingly said something along the lines of "you should have me sing on the record." Grace was a big fan of Tegan and Sara and liked Quin's voice. Grace had an idea for a duet with Quin and she wrote "Borne on the FM Waves of the Heart" with her voice in mind.

In its January 2008 issue, Spin Magazine named New Wave the best album of 2007.

On June 17, 2008 a deluxe edition of New Wave was released in France on Fargo Records with 5 bonus tracks.

In August 2007, Australian singer-songwriter Ben Lee covered the entire album and released it as a free MP3 download on his blog. Explaining why he decided to cover the album, Lee said "I fell in love with the album. Really. Like, couldn't stop listening to it. As heavy and gnarly as it sounds at times, it is unmistakably a pop masterpiece." Lee's wife, Ione Skye, would later direct the music video for the band's song "333" in 2016.

Chicago musician Mike Kinsella covered the song "Borne On The FM Waves" on his album "Other People's Songs" released under his Owen moniker.

The song "Stop!" appeared in season 6, episode 8 of "One Tree Hill". The song also appeared in the 2008 movie "The Sisterhood of the Traveling Pants 2"

The title track appeared in the 2009 movie I Love You, Beth Cooper.

== Commercial performance ==
The album debuted at #57 on the Billboard 200 on the week of its release. As of 2010, the album has sold 127,000 copies in the US.

== Track listing ==
All tracks are written by Laura Jane Grace.

No.	Title	Length
1.	"New Wave"	3:29
2.	"Up the Cuts"	2:53
3.	"Thrash Unreal"	4:14
4.	"White People for Peace"	3:33
5.	"Stop!"	2:34
6.	"Borne on the FM Waves of the Heart" (Featuring Tegan Quin of Tegan and Sara)	4:10
7.	"Piss and Vinegar"	2:27
8.	"Americans Abroad"	2:17
9.	"Animal"	3:21
10.	"The Ocean"	4:39

Deluxe edition bonus tracks
No.	Title	Length
11.	"Gypsy Panther"	3:26
12.	"So Much More"	3:46
13.	"Full Sesh"	3:05
14.	"Untitled"	2:26
15.	"You Must Be Willing"	4:26

Special edition bonus DVD 'Live at the Key Club'
No.	Title	Length
1.	"Cliché Guevara"	2:52
2.	"From Her Lips to God's Ears (The Energizer)"	2:55
3.	"Rice and Bread"	1:43
4.	"Americans Abroad"	3:17
5.	"White People for Peace"	3:39
6.	"Don't Lose Touch"	3:25
7.	"Up the Cuts"	2:52
8.	"New Wave"	3:38
9.	"Sink, Florida, Sink"	2:27
10.	"The Ocean"	4:40
11.	"Problems"	2:55
12.	"Pints of Guinness Make You Strong"	3:20
13.	"Bastards of Young (The Replacements cover)"	5:13
14.	"Walking Is Still Honest"	2:46
15.	"We Laugh at Danger (And Break All the Rules)"	4:39

=== B-sides ===
B-sides digital release cover art.

A digital release titled New Wave B-Sides compiled several of the available B-sides in one EP. It was made available on Amazon's MP3 download service on July 29, 2008.

No.	Title	Length
1.	""Gypsy Panther" (also on Stop 7")"	3:26
2.	""So Much More" (also on New Wave 7" and New Wave Deluxe Edition)"	3:46
3.	""Full Sesh" (also on White People for Peace 7")"	3:05
4.	""Untitled" (also on New Wave Deluxe Edition)- Later posted on Laura Jane Grace's MySpace under the name "Graceful Concession" by Elephant Ears"	2:26
5.	""You Must Be Willing" (also on Thrash Unreal 7")"	4:26

The digital release is missing the following released b-sides

- "White People for Peace" (Butch Vig remix) which was previously available on the "White People for Peace" 12" single and iTunes digital download
- "Animal" (acoustic) which was previously available on the "Thrash Unreal" iTunes EP
- "New Wave" (acoustic) which was previously available on the UK "Thrash Unreal" CD single
- "Stop!" (Funky Face vs. The DBL Stops Mix) which was previously available on UK versions of the "Stop!" single

== Personnel ==
- Laura Jane Grace – vocals, guitar, "Panther" cover
- James Bowman – guitar, backup vocals
- Andrew Seward – bass, vocals
- Warren Oakes – drums, vocals
- Tegan Quin – additional vocals on "Borne on the FM Waves of the Heart"
- Butch Vig – producer, mixer on "White People for Peace"
- Rich Costey – mixer
- Paul Schiek – photos
- The Small Stakes – layout

== Charts ==
Chart (2007)	Peak position
US Billboard 200	57
