= Astoria 2 =

Former nightclub in London, England

Coordinates: 51.515867°N 0.130825°W

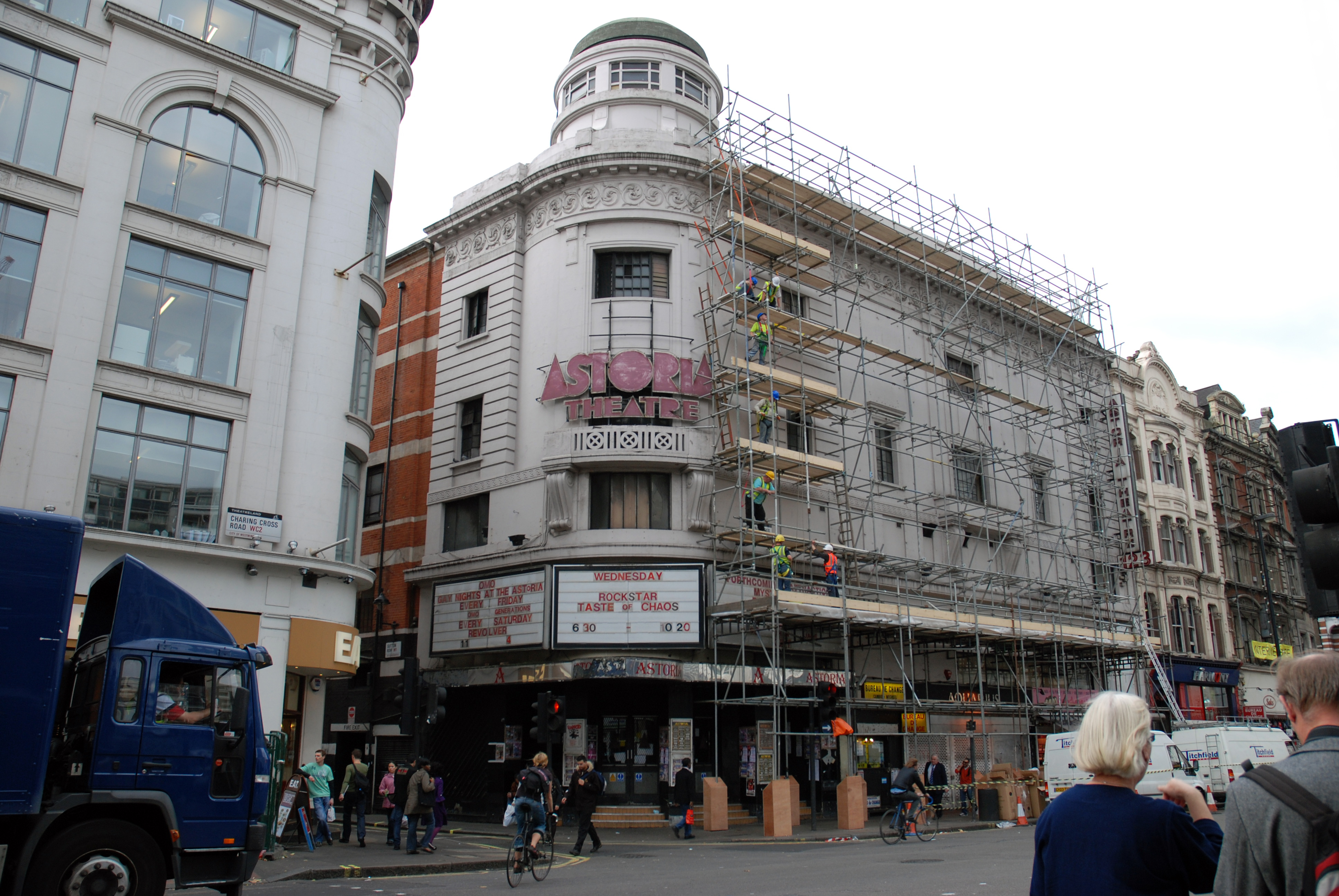
- Workmen preparing to demolish the Astoria in October 2008. The entrance to Astoria 2 is on the right of the building under scaffolding.
- Interactive map of Astoria 2
- Location: Soho, London, England
- Owner: Festival Republic
- Capacity: 1,000

Website
- meanfiddler.com

The Astoria 2, subsequently known as the LA2 and later the Mean Fiddler, was a nightclub at 165 Charing Cross Road in London, England.

== History ==
The venue was originally a ballroom in the basement of the London Astoria theatre and connected by stairways, so that the two venues could function as a single venue when needed. Like the Astoria, the venue was used for live music as well as nightclub promotions. At one point the venue was called Bang and was a gay nightclub.

A venue also called Mean Fiddler was previously set up in Harlesden, north-west London, in 1982.

In June 2006, the Mean Fiddler was sold – together with the London Astoria – to property group Derwent Valley Central, who planned to convert the site into a combination of shops and offices.

In January 2009, the property was compulsorily purchased for Crossrail. Astoria 2 had a closing party, headlined by rock band Open The Skies, with support from Outcry Fire, F.A.T.E and Orakai. The final club night PUSH was held the following day on 15 January 2009, with Cajun Dance Party and Good Shoes being the last acts to play at Astoria 2. The entire venue was demolished in the late 2000s.

== Recordings ==
- Against Me! recorded their live album Americans Abroad!!! Against Me!!! Live in London!!! at the venue on 21 March 2006.
- Enter Shikari recorded their three shows at the venue on 2, 3 and 4 November 2008. The DVD was released with a special edition of their second album Common Dreads.
- Gaslight Anthem played at Astoria 2 on 5 December 2008, and a bootleg was made by fans.
- Razorlight recorded six tracks at the FROG club night in 2004, which was released as a bonus DVD to their debut album Up All Night.
- Metallica played a secret gig in 1995 at Astoria 2.
- A fan-made bootleg recording of a gig by The Fall on 12 August 1998 was released on CD by Cog Sinister in 2018.
- Swans played their final show for 13 years in 1997 at Astoria 2, this was later bootlegged.

== See also ==
- Vince Power, founder of Mean Fiddler
