= Lucy Hale =

American actress and singer (born 1989)

- Hale in 2026
- Born: Karen Lucille Hale; June 14, 1989 (age 37); Memphis, Tennessee, U.S.
- Occupations: Actress; singer
- Years active: 2003–present
- Musical career
- Genres: Pop; country
- Labels: Jive; Hollywood; DMG Nashville

Karen Lucille Hale (born June 14, 1989) is an American actress and singer. Her breakthrough role as Aria Montgomery in the television series Pretty Little Liars (2010–2017) won her seven Teen Choice Awards, the most for any actress in a single series. She has also won accolades at the Gracie Awards and the People's Choice Awards.

Hale first became known in 2003, as one of five winners of the reality show American Juniors. She appeared in the film The Sisterhood of the Traveling Pants 2 (2008) before landing her role on Pretty Little Liars. While starring on the show, she appeared in the films A Cinderella Story: Once Upon a Song and Scream 4 (both 2011), released her debut album Road Between (2014), and began hosting Dick Clark's New Year's Rockin' Eve (2016–2021).

Hale's television roles following Pretty Little Liars include Life Sentence (2018), Katy Keene (2020) as the titular character, and Ragdoll (2021). Her continued film appearances include Truth or Dare, Dude (both 2018), Fantasy Island (2020), The Hating Game (2021) and Which Brings Me to You (2024).

== Early life ==
Karen Lucille Hale was born on June 14, 1989, in Memphis, Tennessee, to Julie Knight and Preston Hale. She was named after one of her great-grandmothers. Her mother is a registered nurse. She has an older sister, Maggie, a step-sister, Kirby, and three stepsisters through her father. Hale was homeschooled as a child. During her childhood, she took acting and singing lessons.

== Career ==
=== 2003–2009: Early roles and recognition ===
In 2003, Hale first appeared on television as a contestant in the Fox reality show American Juniors. On July 30, 2003, Hale finished in fourth place and became part of a group of the same name formed of the top 5 finishers (Chauncey Matthews, Danielle White and Tori & Taylor Thompson). The group disbanded in 2005, after their self-titled studio album's lackluster sales.

Hale moved to Los Angeles at age 15 in the hopes of getting a record deal. Shortly after, she started auditioning for acting roles and received a minor role on Drake & Josh and guest roles on shows such as Ned's Declassified School Survival Guide, The O.C., and How I Met Your Mother. She appeared as Miranda Hampson in two episodes of the Disney Channel show Wizards of Waverly Place.

In 2007, Hale appeared in NBC's short-lived series Bionic Woman. Hale plays Becca Sommers, the younger sister of the title character Jaime Sommers (played by Michelle Ryan). The character was originally portrayed by Mae Whitman in the unaired pilot episode, after which Whitman departed the series.

In August 2008, Hale made her film debut in The Sisterhood of the Traveling Pants 2 portraying Effie Kaligaris, the younger sister of Lena Kaligaris (played by Alexis Bledel). Hale then appeared in The CW series Privileged as Rose Baker, with co-stars Ashley Newbrough and JoAnna Garcia. She starred in the Lifetime television film Sorority Wars.

=== 2010–2017: Pretty Little Liars and mainstream breakthrough ===
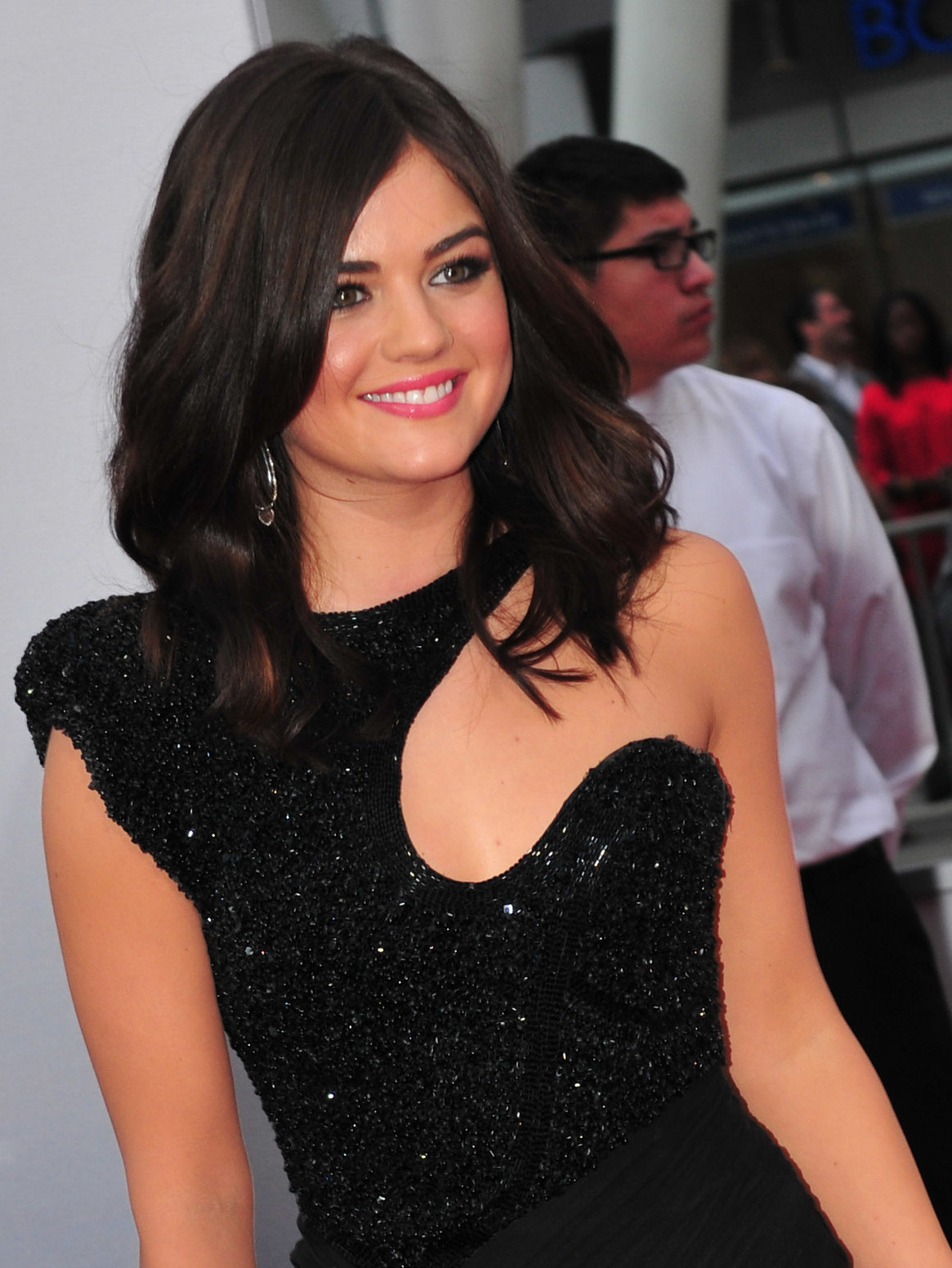
Hale at the 38th People's Choice Awards in 2012

In October 2009, Hale was cast as Aria Montgomery in Pretty Little Liars, based on the book series of the same name by Sara Shepard. The television series lasted seven seasons from 2010 to 2017, with Hale's performance being praised by critics. She also received a number of awards and nominations for her performance, including seven Teen Choice Awards, a Gracie Allen Award, a People's Choice Award and a Young Hollywood Award.

In January 2010, Hale appeared as the singer Phoebe Nichols and her identical body double Vanessa Patton in the CSI: Miami episode "Show Stopper". In 2011, Hale had a cameo role as Sherrie in the slasher film Scream 4. Later, she was cast as the aspiring singer Katie Gibbs in A Cinderella Story: Once Upon a Song, the third installment of A Cinderella Story series, which was released on direct-to-video in September 2011. She also recorded songs for the film's soundtrack.

Hale has made appearances of music videos, such as Foy Vance's "She Burns", Chase Jordan's "Lose Control (Take a Sip)" and Jackson Harris' "Come Back Down to Earth".

Hale hosted an episode of MTV's Punk'd which aired on April 26, 2012. The episode also featured Hale's Pretty Litte Liars co-star Ian Harding, Vanessa Hudgens and Josh Hutcherson. The same year, Hale voiced Periwinkle, the twin sister of Tinker Bell (voiced by Mae Whitman) in the Disney animated film Secret of the Wings. In June 2012, Hale announced that she had signed a record deal with Hollywood Records (in co-partnership with DMG Nashville).

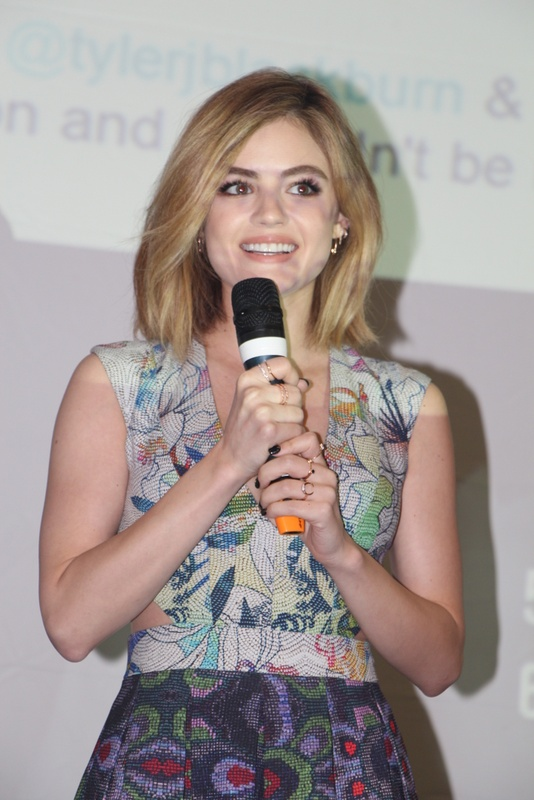
Hale in 2016

On June 11, 2013, Hale announced her role as Ambassador of the beauty brand Mark Girl. Hale co-hosted the Teen Choice Awards with Darren Criss in 2013 and David Dobrik in 2019 and the 2014 MTV Video Music Awards Pre-Show with Sway Calloway. Hale's debut studio album Road Between was released on June 3, 2014.

In 2015, Hale collaborated with Rascal Flatts on a cover of "Let It Go" from the Disney animated film Frozen for the compilation album We Love Disney. Hale served as a correspondent in New Orleans and co-hosted with Ryan Seacrest in Times Square for Dick Clark's New Year's Rockin' Eve (2016–2021), making her the first millennial actress to co-host the Times Square segments.

Hale has recorded two stand-alone Christmas songs, the original song "Mistletoe" and a cover of Francesca Battistelli's "You're Here", released in 2014 and 2017, respectively.

=== 2018–present: Continued film and television work ===
In 2018, Hale was cast in The CW comedy-drama series Life Sentence as Stella Abbott, a woman who finds out that her terminal cancer is cured. The show was canceled after one season. The same year, Hale starred in three films, Truth or Dare, Dude and The Unicorn. On March 11, 2019, Hale was cast as the lead role in Katy Keene, based on the Archie Comics character of the same name.

In 2020, Hale starred as Melanie Cole in the supernatural horror film Fantasy Island. In 2021, Hale starred as the lead role in the romantic comedy film The Hating Game. The same year, Hale became a brand ambassador and model for lingerie company Hunkemöller. She was set to star in Scarlett Holmes in 2027.

== Artistry ==
Hale described music as her "first love". Her early musical influences were Christina Aguilera, Shania Twain and Faith Hill, but her interest in pursuing music was prompted by Britney Spears' "...Baby One More Time". Kristian Bush of country band Sugarland said: "She sounds like Carrie Underwood—strong with a blues side and a pop side to it. And a lot like Faith Hill."

== Personal life ==
Hale has struggled with anxiety, depression, and eating disorders, discussing the latter in August 2012. She also struggled with addiction, having started drinking at 14 and attempting to quit alcohol on several occasions. In an episode of The Diary of a CEO podcast, Hale said: "I just held on to that belief that the real Lucy came out when she was drinking. It also quieted my mind... my brain just doesn't shut off and it's exhausting. I was a textbook binge drinker, blackout, wouldn't remember what I did or what I said, which is scary." In January 2024, Hale announced that she was two years sober from alcohol.

In her free time, Hale enjoys hiking, yoga, and Pilates.

=== Activism ===
On September 14, 2024, Hale received the Humanitarian Award at the 34th Annual Friendly House Awards Luncheon in Los Angeles. Friendly House is a women's addiction recovery center. She told People magazine: "When I got sober, my intention was never to be the poster child of sobriety. But when I began speaking about it, it came from a place of needing to heal and take my power back."

== Filmography ==
=== Film ===
Year	Title	Role	Notes
2008	The Sisterhood of the Traveling Pants 2	Effie Kaligaris	As Lucy Kate Hale
2009	Fear Island	Megan / Jenna Campbell	
2011	Scream 4	Sherrie	Cameo
2011	A Cinderella Story: Once Upon a Song	Katie Gibbs	Direct to video
2012	Secret of the Wings	Periwinkle	Voice role
2016	Waiting on Roxie	Roxie Hart	Short; also producer
2018	Truth or Dare	Olivia Barron	
2018	Dude	Lily	
2018	The Unicorn	Jesse	
2019	Trouble	Zoe Bell	Voice role
2020	Fantasy Island	Melanie Cole	
2020	A Nice Girl Like You	Lucy Neal	Also co-producer
2020	Son of the South	Carol Anne	
2021	The Hating Game	Lucy Hutton	Also executive producer
2022	The Storied Life of A.J. Fikry	Amelia "Amy" Loman	Also executive producer
2022	Borrego	Elly	Also executive producer
2022	Big Gold Brick	Lily Deveraux	
2023	Inside Man	Gina	
2023	Puppy Love	Nicole	
2024	Which Brings Me to You	Jane	Also producer
2024	Running On Empty	Kate	
2025	F*** Marry Kill	Eva Vaughn	Also co-executive producer
2026	The 12 Dates of Christmas	Christina Walker	
TBA	White Mars	Sammie	Post-production
TBA	Princess	TBA	Post-production

=== Television ===
Year	Title	Role	Notes
2003	American Juniors	Herself / Contestant	Finished in fourth place
2003	An American Idol Christmas	Herself	Television special
2005	Ned's Declassified School Survival Guide	Amy Cassidy	Episode: "Upperclassmen" & "Gross Biology Dissection"
2006	Drake & Josh	Hazel	Episode: "Theater Thug"
2006	Secrets of a Small Town	Tisha Steele	Episode: "Pilot"
2006	The O.C.	Hadley Hawthorne	Episode: "The Man of the Year"
2007, 2014	How I Met Your Mother	Katie Scherbatsky	Episodes: "First Time in New York" & "Vesuvius"
2007	Bionic Woman	Becca Sommers	Main role (as Lucy Kate Hale)
2007	American Family	Brittany Jane	Television film
2007–2008	Wizards of Waverly Place	Miranda Hampson	Episodes: "First Kiss" & "Pop Me and We Both Go Down"
2008	The Apostles	Rachel Rydell	Television Film
2008–2009	Privileged	Rose Baker	Main role (as Lucy Kate Hale)
2009	Ruby & the Rockits	Kristen	Episode: "Smells Like Teen Drama"
2009	Sorority Wars	Katie Parker	Television film
2009	Private Practice	Danielle Palmer	Episode: "Pushing the Limits" (as Lucy Kate Hale)
2010	CSI: Miami	Phoebe Nichols / Vanessa Patton	Episode: "Show Stopper"
2010–2017	Pretty Little Liars	Aria Montgomery	Main role
2012	Punk'd	Herself	Episode: "Lucy Hale"
2013 & 2019	Teen Choice Awards	Herself, co-host	
2014	2014 MTV Video Music Awards	Herself, co-host	
2014	Baby Daddy	Piper Stockdale	Episode: "Bonnie's Unreal Estate"
2015	Baring It All: Inside New York Fashion Week	Herself	Documentary
2016–2021	Dick Clark's New Year's Rockin' Eve	Herself	New Orleans correspondent (2016–2019), Co-Host (2019–2021)
2018	Life Sentence	Stella Abbott	Main role
2018	Hollywood Medium with Tyler Henry	Herself	Episode: "April 4, 2018"
2019	Ryan Hansen Solves Crimes on Television	Herself	Episode: "The Ry Chromosome"
2020	Katy Keene	Katy Keene	Main role
2020–2021	Riverdale	Katy Keene	Episodes: "Chapter Sixty-Nine: Men of Honor" & "Chapter Eighty-Four: Lock & Key" (voice role)
2021	Ragdoll	DC Lake Edmunds	Miniseries
2027	Scarlett Holmes	Scarlett Holmes	Miniseries; also executive producer

=== Podcasts ===
Year	Title	Role	Notes	Ref.
2020	Day by Day	Maya	Voice role; episode: "Big Nights In"	
2023	Broad Ideas with Rachel Bilson	Herself	Voice role; episode: "Lucy Hale on Panty-Droppers, Mental Health, and Chakras"	

=== Web ===
Year	Title	Role	Notes	Ref.
2014	The Road Between with Lucy Hale	Herself	4 episodes	
2017	Lex & Los	Herself	Episode: "Human vs. White Shark"	

== Discography ==
Lucy Hale discography
- Studio albums: 1
- Soundtrack albums: 3
- Singles: 4
- Music videos: 4
- Promotional singles: 7

=== Studio albums ===
Title	Album details	Peak chart positions				Sales
Title	Album details	US Country	US	CAN	AUS	Sales
Road Between	Release date: June 3, 2014; Formats: CD, Digital Download; Label: Hollywood, DMG Nashville	4	14	13	57	US: 44,000+

=== Soundtrack albums ===
Title	Details
A Cinderella Story: Once Upon a Song	Released: September 6, 2011; Formats: CD, digital download; Label: WaterTower Music
Katy Keene: Special Episode – Kiss of the Spider Woman: The Musical	Released: March 20, 2020; Formats: CD, digital download; Label: WaterTower Music
Katy Keene: Season 1 (Original Television Soundtrack)	Released: May 15, 2020; Formats: CD, digital download; Label: WaterTower Music

=== Singles ===
Title	Year	Peak chart positions				Album
Title	Year	US Hot Country	Country Airplay	US	CAN	Album
"Run This Town"	2011	—	—	—	—	A Cinderella Story: Once Upon a Song
"Bless Myself"	2011	—	—	—	—	A Cinderella Story: Once Upon a Song
"You Sound Good to Me"	2014	21	47	88	57	Road Between
"Lie a Little Better"	2014	—	54	—	—	Road Between

=== Other and promotional singles ===
Title	Year	Peak position		Album
Title	Year	Country Digital	Holiday Digital	Album
"Mistletoe"	2014	—	40	Non-album single
"Let It Go" (with Rascal Flatts)	2015	—	—	We Love Disney
"You're Here"	2017	—	—	Non-album single

=== Other appearances ===
Year	Title	Other artist(s)	Album	Ref.
2003	"One Step Closer"	The Top 10 of American Juniors	Kids in America	
2003	"I'm Gonna Make You Love Me"	None	Kids in America	
2003	"Kids in America"	The Top 10 of American Juniors	Kids in America	
2004	"ABC"	Artists of American Juniors	American Juniors	
2004	"No Matta What (Party All Night)"	Artists of American Juniors	American Juniors	
2004	"True Colors"	Artists of American Juniors	American Juniors	
2004	"Unstoppable"	Artists of American Juniors	American Juniors	
2004	"One Step Closer"	Artists of American Juniors	American Juniors	
2004	"Have You Ever"	Artists of American Juniors	American Juniors	
2004	"Reach Out I'll Be There"	Artists of American Juniors	American Juniors	
2004	"Emotional"	Artists of American Juniors	American Juniors	
2004	"Sundown"	Artists of American Juniors	American Juniors	
2004	"Bring the House Down"	Artists of American Juniors	American Juniors	
2004	"Love Ain't Gonna Wait for You"	Artists of American Juniors	American Juniors	
2011	"Make You Believe"	None	A Cinderella Story: Once Upon a Song	
2011	"Extra Ordinary"	None	A Cinderella Story: Once Upon a Song	
2015	"It's a Small World"	We Love Disney artists	We Love Disney	
2019	"Back to Earth"	None	Trouble	
2019	"Back to Earth" (Pop Version)	Snoop Dogg	Trouble	
2019	"Made for Two"	Jason Mraz	Trouble	
2020	"Dirrty"	Cast of Katy Keene	Katy Keene: Season 1	
2020	"My Strongest Suit"	Cast of Katy Keene	Katy Keene: Season 1	
2020	"She Used to Be Mine"	None	Katy Keene: Season 1	
2020	"Prologue (Reprise)"	None	Katy Keene: Special Episode – Kiss of the Spider Woman: The Musical	
2020	"Dressing Them Up"	Jonny Beauchamp and Nathan Lee Graham	Katy Keene: Special Episode – Kiss of the Spider Woman: The Musical	
2024	"It Had to Be You"	Spencer Hutchings, Nat Wolff and Britne Oldford	Which Brings Me to You	

=== Music videos ===
==== As lead artist ====
Year	Title	Director	Ref.
2011	"Bless Myself"	None	
2011	"Run This Town"	None	
2014	"You Sound Good to Me"	Philip Andelman	
2014	"Lie a Little Better"	Philip Andelman	

==== Guest appearances ====
Year	Title	Artist(s)	Director	Ref.
2011	"Lose Control (Take a Sip)"	Chase Jordan	Jeff Moriarty	
2012	"Come Back Down to Earth"	Jackson Harris	Jordan Bloch	
2016	"She Burns"	Foy Vance	Gus Black	
2017	"Angels Among Us"	Artists for United in Voice	None	
2020	"On My Way"	Joel Crouse	Robbie Norris	
2021	"State of the Heart"	Patrick Droney	Gus Black	
2023	"We Don't Fight Anymore"	Carly Pearce; Chris Stapleton	Alexa Campbell	

=== Songwriting credits ===
Title	Year	Artist(s)	Album	Credits	Written with
"Come a Little Closer"	2013	Sylvie Vartan	Sylvie in Nashville	Co-writer	Mike Daly and Kristian Bush
"Just Another Song"	2014	Lucy Hale	Road Between	Co-writer	Mike Daly and Catt Gravitt
"Feels Like Home"	2014	Lucy Hale	Road Between	Co-writer	Mike Daly and Kristian Bush
"Loved"	2014	Lucy Hale	Road Between	Co-writer	Brett James and Caitlyn Smith
"The Call"	2015	Ashliegh Lisset	Non-album single	Co-writer	Zac Maloy and Michael Daley

== Awards and nominations ==
Year	Association	Category	Work	Result	Ref.
2010	Teen Choice Awards	Choice Summer TV Star: Female	Pretty Little Liars	Won	
2011	Young Hollywood Awards	Cast to Watch (with Troian Bellisario, Ashley Benson & Shay Mitchell)	Pretty Little Liars	Won	
2011	Teen Choice Awards	Choice Summer TV Star: Female	Pretty Little Liars	Won	
2012	Teen Choice Awards	Choice TV Actress: Drama	Pretty Little Liars	Won	
2013	Gracie Allen Awards	Outstanding Performance by a Female Rising Star	Pretty Little Liars	Won	
2013	Teen Choice Awards	Choice Summer TV Star: Female	Pretty Little Liars	Won	
2013	Young Hollywood Awards	Crossover of the Year	Herself	Won	
2014	People's Choice Awards	Favorite Cable TV Actress	Pretty Little Liars	Won	
2014	Teen Choice Awards	Choice TV Actress: Drama	Pretty Little Liars	Won	
2014	MTV Europe Music Awards	Artist On the Rise	Herself	Nominated	
2015	People's Choice Awards	Favorite Cable TV Actress	Pretty Little Liars	Nominated	
2015	People's Choice Awards	Favorite Country Female Artist	Herself	Nominated	
2015	Teen Choice Awards	Choice TV Actress: Drama	Pretty Little Liars	Won	
2016	People's Choice Awards	Favorite Cable TV Actress	Pretty Little Liars	Nominated	
2016	Teen Choice Awards	Choice Summer TV Star: Female	Pretty Little Liars	Nominated	
2017	People's Choice Awards	Favorite Cable TV Actress	Pretty Little Liars	Nominated	
2017	Teen Choice Awards	Choice TV Actress: Drama	Pretty Little Liars	Won	
2018	Teen Choice Awards	Choice Movie Actress: Drama	Truth or Dare	Nominated	
2018	Teen Choice Awards	Choice Instagrammer	Herself	Nominated	
2021	Golden Raspberry Awards	Worst Supporting Actress	Fantasy Island	Nominated	
2024	Friendly House	Humanitarian Award	Herself	Won	
