= Cavalier Eternal =

Single by Against Me!

from the album Against Me! as the Eternal Cowboy
- A-side: "Cavalier Eternal"
- B-side: "You Look Like I Need a Drink"
- Released: May 4, 2004
- Recorded: August 2003
- Studio: Ardent Studios in Memphis, Tennessee
- Genre: Punk rock, folk punk
- Length: 5:38
- Label: No Idea (151)
- Songwriter: Laura Jane Grace
- Producer: Rob McGregor

Against Me! singles chronology
| "The Disco Before the Breakdown" (2002) | "Cavalier Eternal" (2004) | "Sink, Florida, Sink" (2005) |

"Cavalier Eternal" is a song by the Gainesville, Florida-based punk rock band Against Me!, released as the first single from their 2003 album Against Me! as the Eternal Cowboy. While the album was released by Fat Wreck Chords, the 7-inch singles for "Cavalier Eternal" and "Sink, Florida, Sink" were released by the band's previous label No Idea Records, using alternate versions of the songs that differ from the versions on the album.

== Background ==
For the recording of their second album, Against Me! as the Eternal Cowboy, Against Me! chose to work with producer Rob McGregor, who had recorded their first album and two previous EPs. The band planned to record at Ardent Studios in Memphis, Tennessee, where they could make an all-analog recording with very few overdubs. In order to ensure that McGregor would be familiar with the new songs by the time they went to Memphis, the band recorded demos for the entire album at his Goldentone Studios in their hometown of Gainesville, Florida on July 15 in the span of a few hours. The rest of the album was recorded that August at Ardent. The version of "Cavalier Eternal" from the July 15 Goldentone session was used on the album, as Fat Wreck Chords head Fat Mike preferred it to the version recorded at Ardent. The band elected to release the Ardent version as a single through their previous label No Idea Records, along with a single for "Sink, Florida, Sink", both singles using alternate versions of songs from the album's recording sessions. The B-side of "Cavalier Eternal" is an acoustic recording of "You Look Like I Need a Drink", while the album version was recorded with a full band and electric instrumentation.

== Track listing ==
All lyrics are written by Laura Jane Grace; all music is composed by Against Me!.

Side A
| No. | Title | Length |
|---|---|---|
| 1. | "Cavalier Eternal" (alternate version) | 2:52 |

Side B
| No. | Title | Length |
|---|---|---|
| 1. | "You Look Like I Need a Drink" (acoustic) | 2:46 |
| Total length: | | 5:38 |

== Personnel ==
=== Band ===
- Laura Jane Grace – guitar, lead vocals, art concepts and layout
- James Bowman – guitar, backing vocals
- Andrew Seward – bass guitar, backing vocals

=== Production ===
- Rob McGregor – producer
- Pete Matthews – mixing engineer, engineer
- Adam Hill – assistant engineer
- Brad Blackwoon – mastering
- Bryan K. Wynacht – photography

== See also ==
- Against Me! discography
