= Thrash Unreal =

Single by Against Me!

from the album New Wave
- Released: October 10, 2007
- Recorded: 2006
- Genre: Punk rock
- Length: 4:14
- Label: Sire
- Songwriter: Laura Jane Grace
- Producer: Butch Vig

Against Me! singles chronology
"White People For Peace" (2007)	"Thrash Unreal" (2007)	"Stop!" (2008)

"Thrash Unreal" is a song by American punk rock band Against Me!. It was released on October 10, 2007 as the second single from their fourth studio album New Wave and became their first single to chart in the United States, hitting No. 11 on Billboard's Alternative Songs chart, which was their highest charting song.

The title of the song was coined by the album's producer, Butch Vig. It was also released as a downloadable track for the Rock Band video game series on March 17, 2009.

== Background ==
In a 2011 interview, Grace said she wrote "Thrash Unreal" after producer Butch Vig encouraged her to make a song similar to Lou Reed's "Walk on the Wild Side". According to Grace, the lyrics are fictional and "the 'she' in the song is just a composite of people I’ve met over the years, no one in particular."

A friend of Grace felt hurt and embarrassed after mistakenly believing that "Thrash Unreal" was written about her. When she died in 2009, Grace spoke with her mother at her funeral and Grace promised to write a new song about her, which became "Because of the Shame" on 2010's White Crosses.

The lyric "She can still hear that rebel yell just as loud as it was in 1983" references Billy Idol's 1983 song "Rebel Yell".

== Reception ==
Alternative Press named it the third-best Against Me! song. Spin placed it at No. 20 on a list of The 21 Best Pop-Punk Choruses of the 21st Century.

== Vinyl single ==
The single was made for sale on 7" single on July 10, 2007 as a limited edition bonus for preordering New Wave. It was distributed through Interpunk, Smartpunk and No Idea Records. It was pressed on black and red vinyl with 6,500 and 500 copies printed for each color, respectively.

=== Track listing ===
1. "Thrash Unreal" - 4:14
2. "You Must Be Willing" - 4:25

== CD single ==
The CD version of the "Thrash Unreal" single was released in October, 2007, on Sire Records and contains a different track 2 from the vinyl release.

=== Track listing ===
1. "Thrash Unreal" - 4:14
2. "New Wave" (acoustic) - 3:23

== Music video ==
The original concept for the music video featured Grace, who publicly identified as male at the time, dressed as a woman in an attempt to explore themes of gender dysphoria. However, the label's A&R department refused to greenlight it. Instead, she settled on a new concept which Grace called "this shitty video where I’m shirtless and lying."

The video portrays a girl who seems distressed during a party while the band is found playing in the basement under the room the party is taking place in. When she drops her glass of wine after a man starts touching her, the wine seeps through a small drain in the floor upstairs and spills onto the band downstairs. The girl then isolates herself from the party and releases her anger by stomping on the floor, breaking some plaster that falls on the band as well. Around the same time, a few of the partygoers (New Wave producer Butch Vig being one of them) dump a huge vat of wine over the floor, showering the band in both plaster and wine. The atmosphere of the party also intensifies shortly afterward. Eventually, the girl hits the floor hard enough to break through it and she falls into the basement. She lands on her feet where the band is playing, seemingly elated to be away from the chaos upstairs. The video ends with a final scene that simply shows the empty, wine-drenched basement with only the band's equipment displayed.

== Charts ==
Chart (2007)	Peak position
Canada Hot 100 (Billboard)	51
US Alternative Airplay (Billboard)	11
