= Lie a Little Better =

Single by Lucy Hale

from the album Road Between
- Released: July 21, 2014
- Genre: Country rock
- Length: 3:46 (album version); 3:35 (radio edit)
- Label: Hollywood; DMG Nashville
- Songwriters: Mike Daly; Chris DeStefano; Melissa Peirce
- Producer: Mike Daly

Lucy Hale singles chronology
"You Sound Good to Me" (2014)	"Lie a Little Better" (2014)

Music video
- "Lie a Little Better" on YouTube

"Lie a Little Better" is a song recorded by American country singer Lucy Hale. The song was written by Mike Daly, Chris DeStefano and Melissa Peirce and was produced by Daly. It was released on July 21, 2014, by Hollywood Records and DMG Nashville, as the second and final single from Hale's debut studio album Road Between (2014).

In March 2018, Hale revealed the song is about her love crush with actor Drew Van Acker.

== Music video ==
The music video premiered on CMT and GAC on July 29 and was released on Vevo on July 30, 2014. It was filmed inside the Grand Ole Opry House in Nashville, Tennessee on June 23, which came right after Hale's debut on the Grand Ole Opry radio show a day earlier, on June 22.

The video was directed by Philip Andelman.

== Chart performance ==
"Lie a Little Better" debuted at number 60 on the Billboard Country Airplay chart for the week ending August 30, 2014.

== Charts ==
Chart performance for "Lie a Little Better"
Chart (2014)	Peak position
US Country Airplay (Billboard)	54
