= Stop! (Against Me! song) =

Single by Against Me!

from the album New Wave
- Released: April 10, 2008
- Recorded: 2005
- Genre: Punk rock; disco-punk
- Length: 2:34
- Label: Sire
- Songwriter(s): Laura Jane Grace
- Producer(s): Butch Vig

Against Me! singles chronology
"Thrash Unreal" (2007)	"Stop!" (2008)	"I Was A Teenage Anarchist" (2010)

"Stop!" is a single by punk group Against Me!. It is the third single from their album New Wave. The video game Rock Band features this song as downloadable content.

The single was released on CD and as a limited edition 7" vinyl single, 4500 on black vinyl and 500 on yellow vinyl.

== Music video ==
Two music videos were produced for this song.

The first music video was made by Justin Staggs and featured the band smashing up an old TV (which actually shows the band performing the song on a program similar to a late night talk show) as if telling it to stop.

A second music video was created and directed by Marc Klasfeld. Unlike the previous video, which was partially comical, this video is more stern, bringing up political and social issues in America. In the video, the band is performing the song in a closed room in front of a voting booth. The video also shows other events occurring in the room, albeit with the absence of the band, such as two gay men being wedded, a homeless woman looking for food, a woman and a man arguing over abortion (the woman believes it should be legal while the man doesn't), and a man being arrested by a police officer, with the voting booth playing a vital role throughout all of the events (this video was created and broadcast near the 2008 election). The video ends with the voting booth bursting into flames.

== Track listing ==
1. "Stop!" – 2:34
2. "Gypsy Panther" – 4:25

== Personnel ==
- Laura Jane Grace – vocals, guitar, "Panther" cover
- James Bowman – guitar, backup vocals
- Andrew Seward – bass, vocals
- Warren Oakes – drums, vocals
- Butch Vig – producer
- Rich Costey – mixer

== Charts ==
Chart (2008)	Peak position
Canada (Canadian Hot 100)	78
US Alternative Airplay (Billboard)	27
