= From Her Lips to God's Ears (The Energizer) =

Single by Against Me!

from the album Searching for a Former Clarity
- A-side: "From Her Lips to God's Ears (The Energizer)" (Energize-O-Tron remix)
- B-side: "From Her Lips to God's Ears (The Energizer)"
- Released: April 4, 2006
- Recorded: April 18–May 16, 2005 at The Magpie Cage in Baltimore
- Genre: Punk rock, Oi!
- Length: 5:08
- Label: Fat Wreck Chords (FAT 714)
- Songwriters: Laura Jane Grace, James Bowman, Warren Oakes, Andrew Seward
- Producer: J. Robbins

Against Me! singles chronology
"Don't Lose Touch" (2005)	"From Her Lips to God's Ears (The Energizer)" (2006)	"White People for Peace" (2007)

"From Her Lips to God's Ears (The Energizer)" is a song by the Gainesville, Florida-based punk rock band Against Me!, released as the second single from their 2005 album Searching for a Former Clarity. Like the first single "Don't Lose Touch", it was released exclusively on twelve-inch vinyl with a remixed version of the song as the A-side and the album version as the B-side. The A-side version was remixed by Ad-Rock of the Beastie Boys. The single was limited to 3,185 copies. The lyrics of the song address then-United States Secretary of State Condoleezza Rice on the subject of the Iraq War, with lines such as "After all this death and destruction, do you really think your actions advocate freedom?" and "Condoleezza, what are we gonna do now?"

The music video for "From Her Lips to God's Ears (The Energizer)" depicts a fantasy world analogous to that of The Wizard of Oz. A young girl with the head of a rabbit, after watching news footage of Condoleezza Rice defending the United States' police actions in the Iraq War, sets out along a yellow brick road in search of Rice. Along the way she is joined by two men, one with the head of a pig and the other with the head of a chicken, both of whom are also seeking Rice. The trio arrive at a palace in which they find an animatronic puppet with Rice's televised face, to which they pose the question "What are we gonna do now?" The question confounds and overloads the puppet, and the trio escape as it and the building collapse and explode.

== Track listing ==
All lyrics are written by Laura Jane Grace; all music is composed by Against Me!.

Side A
No.	Title	Length
1.	"From Her Lips to God's Ears (The Energizer)" (Energize-O-Tron remix)	2:34

Side B
No.	Title	Length
1.	"From Her Lips to God's Ears (The Energizer)"	2:34
Total length:		5:08

== Personnel ==
=== Band ===
- Laura Jane Grace – guitar, lead vocals
- James Bowman – guitar, backing vocals
- Andrew Seward – bass guitar, backing vocals
- Warren Oakes – drums

=== Production ===
- J. Robbins – producer, engineer, mixing engineer
- Alan Douches – mastering

== See also ==
- Against Me! discography
