= Philip Andelman =

American music video director and photographer

- Education: New York University
- Occupations: Music video director Photographer
- Years active: 2004–present
- Website: philipandelman.com

Philip Andelman is an American music video director and photographer. Andelman has directed music videos for many notable artists, see below. He has received nominations for his works from the MVPA, VMAs, and CMT awards including MVPA Director of the Year. His commercial work has won a Bronze Clio Award.

== Early life ==
He grew up in Kenya, Paris, and New York City. Andelman attended Phillips Exeter Academy. Andelman was involved in filming since age 10. During his junior year in high school, he started interning with photographer Annie Leibovitz. He received a film degree from New York University. His photographic works have been exhibited at Milk Gallery. He is married and has at least one child.

== Career ==
While at NYU, Andelman directed a 15-minute short film entitled "Looking for Actionman". The film won a grant from director Martin Scorsese. Interning with Annie Leibovitz lead Andelman to become the official photographer for The Grateful Dead. In 2011, Andelman released his first book with the Beastie Boys. Andelman left New York after graduating from NYU to shop a script in Los Angeles. He characterized it as "the worst script ever written" and said "he couldn't even get a meeting". Andelman worked as a 2nd unit director and cinematographer under director Joseph Kahn.

Working with Kahn was a fortuitous experience, as he went from working as a production assistant to 2nd unit director in the course of a single month. During that time as a 2nd unit director, beginning in the summer of 2000, he worked on over 20 music videos including ones for "Elevation", "South Side", and "Hero" Andelman followed Lenny Kravitz during 2002, shooting a documentary/concert film with colleague Mark Seliger. Andelman went on to direct music videos for Kravitz's album Baptism. He also directed Kravitz's campaign for Kohl's. His other commercial works have included videos for Warby Parker, Target, and Verizon.

== Music videos ==
Song	Year	Artist(s)	Ref.
"Where Are We Runnin'?"	2004	Lenny Kravitz	
"California"	2004	Lenny Kravitz	
"Burning in the Sun"	2004	Blue Merle	
"Breathe"	2004	Melissa Etheridge	
"Good Hearted Man"	2004	Tift Merritt	
"Narrow Daylight"	2004	Diana Krall	
"Marvelous Things"	2004	Eisley	
"Calling All Angels"	2005	Lenny Kravitz	
"Lady"	2005	Lenny Kravitz	
"Bug Eyes"	2005	Dredg	
"Hillbillies"	2005	Hot Apple Pie	
"Get Back (Remix)"	2005	Ludacris featuring Sum 41	
"When We Make Love"	2005	Ginuwine	
"Greatest You Can Find"	2005	Keren Ann	
"Don't Lose Touch"	2005	Against Me!	
"Waiting on the World to Change"	2006	John Mayer	
"Love You Lately"	2006	Daniel Powter	
"You Give Me Something"	2006	James Morrison	
"Lolita"	2006	Elefant	
"Where'd You Go"	2006	Fort Minor featuring Holly Brook and Jonah Matranga	
"Well Thought Out Twinkles"	2007	Silversun Pickups	
"Slap"	2007	Ludacris	
"Comeback"	2007	Kelly Rowland	
"I Know"	2007	Jay-Z	
"I'll Be Waiting"	2008	Lenny Kravitz	
"Love Love Love"	2008	Lenny Kravitz	
"Realize"	2008	Colbie Caillat	
"Fly On the Wall"	2008	Miley Cyrus	
"Get Back"	2008	Demi Lovato	
"Lovebug"	2008	Jonas Brothers	
"Reach Out"	2008	Hilary Duff	
"Halo"	2008	Beyoncé	
"Pretty Wings"	2009	Maxwell	
"Three Days in Bed"	2009	Holly Williams	
"Alone"	2009	Holly Williams	
"Battlefield"	2009	Jordin Sparks	
"Water and a Flame"	2009	Daniel Merriweather featuring Adele	
"What About Now"	2009	Westlife	
"Fire with Fire"	2010	Scissor Sisters	
"Already Taken"	2010	Trey Songz	
"Fistful Of Tears"	2010	Maxwell	
"Beauty and the Beast"	2010	Jordin Sparks	
"Round & Round"	2010	Selena Gomez & the Scene	
"Dilly"	2010	Band of Horses	
"Pop Goes the World"	2010	Gossip	
"What's My Name?"	2010	Rihanna	
"Beautiful"	2011	Katharine McPhee	
"Haunting at 1300 McKinley"	2011	The Black Angels	
"Lighthouse"	2011	Westlife	
"Lucky Now"	2011	Ryan Adams	
"Hit the Lights" (Version 1)	2011	Selena Gomez & the Scene	
"Hit the Lights" (Version 2)	2012	Selena Gomez & the Scene	
"Safe & Sound"	2012	Taylor Swift featuring The Civil Wars	
"Shadow Days"	2012	John Mayer	
"Lemme See"	2012	Usher featuring Rick Ross	
"Out of the Game"	2012	Rufus Wainwright	
"Live and Die"	2012	The Avett Brothers	
"Stars"	2012	Grace Potter and the Nocturnals	
"Chains Of Love"	2012	Ryan Adams	
"Miriam"	2012	Norah Jones	
"Ready or Not"	2012	Bridgit Mendler	
"Begin Again"	2012	Taylor Swift	
"Holler If You're With Me"	2013	Tate Stevens	
"Everything Has Changed"	2013	Taylor Swift featuring Ed Sheeran	
"It's You"	2013	Duck Sauce	
"Slow Down"	2013	Selena Gomez	
"A Little Party Never Killed Nobody (All We Got)"	2013	Fergie	
"That Girl"	2013	Jennifer Nettles	
"You Sound Good to Me"	2014	Lucy Hale	
"Lie a Little Better"	2014	Lucy Hale	
"Throw It Down"	2014	Dominique Young Unique	
"Yarmouth Road"	2014	Mike Gordon	
"Sweet Amarillo"	2014	Old Crow Medicine Show	
"Scarecrow"	2014	Alex & Sierra	
"She Came to Give It to You"	2014	Usher featuring Nicki Minaj	
"Lips Are Movin"	2014	Meghan Trainor	
"Lifted Up (1985)"	2015	Passion Pit	
"Better When I'm Dancin'"	2015	Meghan Trainor	
"Destruction"	2016	Joywave	
"Left Hand Kisses"	2016	Andrew Bird and Fiona Apple	
"Siempre brillarás" (as Phil Andelman)	2016	Martina Stoessel	
"Born to Shine" (as Phil Andelman)	2016	Martina Stoessel	
"Light Your Heart" (as Phil Andelman)	2016	Jorge Blanco	
"Yo te amo a ti" (as Phil Andelman)	2016	Martina Stoessel and Jorge Blanco	
"Losing the Love" (as Phil Andelman)	2016	Martina Stoessel	
"Great Escape" (as Phil Andelman)	2016	Martina Stoessel	
"Lake by the Ocean"	2016	Maxwell	
"1990x"	2016	Maxwell	
"Gods"	2017	Maxwell	
"Know No Better"	2017	Major Lazer, Camila Cabello, Travis Scott, and Quavo	
"Pink Lemonade"	2018	James Bay	
"A Whole New World"	2019	ZAYN and Zhavia Ward	
"Texas Sun"	2020	Khruangbin and Leon Bridges	
"Chew on My Heart"	2020	James Bay	
"Forget Me Too"	2020	Machine Gun Kelly featuring Halsey	
"Follow Me (Zoey 101)"	2020	Jamie Lynn Spears and Chantel Jeffries	
"Let Me Reintroduce Myself"	2021	Gwen Stefani	
"OFF"	2021	Maxwell	
"B-Side"	2021	Khruangbin and Leon Bridges	
"The Kids Are All Dying"	2022	Finneas	
"Make Up Sex"	2022	Machine Gun Kelly featuring Blackbear	
"Hold That Heat"	2022	Southside and Future featuring Travis Scott	
"Dirty Secrets"	2023	d4vd	
"Single Soon"	2023	Selena Gomez	
