= Sink, Florida, Sink =

Single by Against Me!

from the album Against Me! as the Eternal Cowboy
- B-side: "Unsubstantiated Rumors Are Good Enough for Me to Base My Life Upon"
- Released: April 8, 2005
- Recorded: August 2003
- Studio: Ardent Studios in Memphis, Tennessee
- Genre: Folk punk, punk rock
- Length: 3:36
- Label: No Idea (152)
- Songwriter(s): Laura Jane Grace
- Producer(s): Rob McGregor

Against Me! singles chronology
"Cavalier Eternal" (2004)	"Sink, Florida, Sink" (2005)	"Don't Lose Touch" (2005)

"Sink, Florida, Sink" is a song by the Gainesville, Florida-based punk rock band Against Me!, released as the second single from their 2003 album Against Me! as the Eternal Cowboy. While the album was released by Fat Wreck Chords, the 7-inch singles for "Sink, Florida, Sink" and "Cavalier Eternal" were released by the band's previous label No Idea Records, using alternate versions of the songs that differ from the versions on the album.

== Background ==
For the recording of their second album, Against Me! as the Eternal Cowboy, Against Me! chose work with producer Rob McGregor, who had recorded their first album and two previous EPs. The bulk of the album was recorded at Ardent Studios in Memphis, Tennessee, where the band could make an all-analog recording with very few overdubs. During the sessions they recorded both acoustic and electric versions of several songs, and decided to release some of the alternate versions as 7" singles through their previous label No Idea Records. Acoustic renditions of "Sink, Florida, Sink" and "Unsubstantiated Rumors Are Good Enough for Me to Base My Life Upon" were used on the album, which was released November 3, 2003. The electric version of "Sink, Florida, Sink" was first released on the Fat Wreck Chords compilation album Rock Against Bush, Vol. 1 in April 2004. The single was released the following year, including the electric versions of "Sink, Florida, Sink" and "Unsubstantiated Rumors Are Good Enough for Me to Base My Life Upon". The single's die-cut, fold-out cover was designed by artist Chris Norris.

== Track listing ==
All songwriting by Laura Jane Grace.

Side A
No.	Title	Length
1.	"Sink, Florida, Sink" (electric)	2:08

Side B
No.	Title	Length
1.	"Unsubstantiated Rumors Are Good Enough for Me to Base My Life Upon" (electric)	1:28
Total length:		3:36

== Personnel ==
=== Band ===
- Laura Jane Grace – guitar, lead vocals
- James Bowman – guitar, backing vocals
- Andrew Seward – bass guitar, backing vocals
- Warren Oakes – drums

=== Production ===
- Rob McGregor – producer
- Pete Matthews – mixing engineer, engineer
- Adam Hill – assistant engineer
- Brad Blackwoon – mastering
- Chris Norris – artwork

== See also ==
- Against Me! discography
