= Don't Lose Touch =

Single by Against Me!

from the album Searching for a Former Clarity
- A-side: "Don't Lose Touch" (Mouse on Mars remix)
- B-side: "Don't Lose Touch"
- Released: September 6, 2005
- Recorded: April 18–May 16, 2005
- Studio: The Magpie Cage in Baltimore
- Genre: Punk rock
- Length: 7:31
- Label: Fat Wreck Chords (FAT 701)
- Songwriter(s): Laura Jane Grace, James Bowman, Warren Oakes, Andrew Seward
- Producer(s): J. Robbins

Against Me! singles chronology
"Sink, Florida, Sink" (2005)	"Don't Lose Touch" (2005)	"From Her Lips to God's Ears (The Energizer)" (2006)

"Don't Lose Touch" is a song by the Gainesville, Florida-based punk rock band Against Me!, released as the first single from their 2005 album Searching for a Former Clarity. Like the second single "From Her Lips to God's Ears (The Energizer)", it was released exclusively on twelve-inch vinyl with a remixed version of the song as the A-side and the album version as the B-side. The A-side version was remixed by German electronic music duo Mouse on Mars. The single was limited to 3,050 copies.

The music video for "Don't Lose Touch" was directed by Philip Andelman. It depicts the band performing the song in a rehearsal and storage space, with parts shown in reverse.

== Track listing ==
All lyrics are written by Laura Jane Grace; all music is composed by Against Me!

Side A
No.	Title	Length
1.	"Don't Lose Touch" (Mouse on Mars remix)	4:33

Side B
No.	Title	Length
1.	"Don't Lose Touch"	2:55
Total length:		7:31

== Personnel ==
- Laura Jane Grace – guitar, lead vocals
- James Bowman – guitar, backing vocals
- Andrew Seward – bass guitar, backing vocals
- Warren Oakes – drums
- J. Robbins – tambourine, producer, engineer, mixing engineer
- Alan Douches – mastering
