= Kids in America (album) =

Compilation album by American Juniors
- Released: September 9, 2003
- Recorded: 2003
- Genre: Pop
- Length: 35:12
- Label: Jive

American Juniors chronology
Kids in America (2003)	American Juniors (2004)

Singles from Kids in America
- 1. "One Step Closer" Released: August 12, 2003

Professional ratings
Review scores
Source	Rating
AllMusic	3/5 stars

Kids in America is the compilation album derived from the short-lived American reality television series American Juniors and released by Jive Records on September 9, 2003. It was performed by the 10 finalists on the show, not just the five who made it in.

== Track listing ==
No.	Title	Artist	Length
1.	"One Step Closer" (S Club Juniors cover)	The Top 10 of American Juniors	3:06
2.	"I'm Gonna Make You Love Me" (Diana Ross & the Supremes and The Temptations cover)	Lucy Hale	2:55
3.	"Build Me Up Buttercup" (The Foundations cover)	Morgan Burke	3:00
4.	"Let 'Er Rip" (Dixie Chicks cover)	Tori Thompson	2:50
5.	"A Whole New World" (Peabo Bryson and Regina Belle cover)	Chauncey Matthews	2:38
6.	"I'll Never Fall in Love Again" (Dionne Warwick cover)	Katelyn Tarver	2:55
7.	"Open Arms" (Journey cover)	Chantel Kohl	3:10
8.	"Proud Mary" (Creedence Clearwater Revival cover)	Taylor Thompson	2:35
9.	"More Today Than Yesterday" (Spiral Starecase cover)	Jordan McCoy	2:50
10.	"I'll Be There" (The Jackson 5 cover)	A.J. Melendez	3:21
11.	"Colors of the Wind" (Vanessa Williams cover)	Danielle White	4:15
12.	"Kids in America" (Kim Wilde cover)	The Top 10 of American Juniors	3:33
Total length:			35:12
