= Grey Heavens =

Studio album by Omnium Gatherum
- Released: 17 February 2016
- Recorded: 2015
- Genre: Melodic death metal
- Length: 56:12
- Label: Lifeforce
- Producer: Markus Vanhala, Teemu Aalto

Omnium Gatherum chronology
Beyond (2013)	Grey Heavens (2016)	The Burning Cold (2018)

Singles from Grey Heavens
- 1. "Skyline" Released: 11 August 2015; 2. "Frontiers" Released: 26 January 2016; 3. "The Pit" Released: 12 February 2016

Professional ratings
Review scores
Source	Rating
Louder Sound	3.5/5 stars
Metal Storm	8.3/10
The Moshville Times	10/10
Sputnikmusic	2.5/5

Grey Heavens is the seventh studio album by Finnish melodic death metal band Omnium Gatherum. It was released on 17 February 2016 in Japan via Avalon Marquee, 19 February in Finland, and 26 February in the rest of Europe via Lifeforce. It received mixed-to-positive reviews from critics.

== Production ==
It is the band's last album with Lifeforce, as they would later sign a deal with Century Media Records (which released Grey Heavens in America) for subsequent releases, as well as their last with longtime drummer Jarmo Pikka, who initially left temporarily for a paternity leave, with Tuomo Latvala filling in, but eventually, Pikka's departure was made permanent and Latvala was promoted to being a full-time member.

== Reception ==
Grey Heavens received mixed-to-positive reviews from critics. However, Andy Synn of No Clean Singing criticised the album, saying that while "it positively crackles with the band's patented musical magic, driven by the same passion and energy that made The Redshift, New World Shadows, and Beyond such thrilling, electrifying albums, ably accented by characteristic tinges of proggy melancholy and shamelessly extravagant fretboard theatrics", the album "limps rather than gallops along, with a much more uneven gait, hamstrung and prevented from reaching its full potential by a nagging feeling of over-familiarity and a sense of "been there, done that" which lingers like a vaguely unpleasant odour."

== Track listing ==
No.	Title	Length
1.	"The Pit"	4:34
2.	"Skyline"	4:30
3.	"Frontiers"	5:09
4.	"Majesty and Silence"	8:36
5.	"Rejuvenate!"	5:28
6.	"Foundation"	5:49
7.	"The Great Liberation"	5:15
8.	"Ophidian Sunrise"	6:13
9.	"These Grey Heavens"	4:25
10.	"Storm Front"	6:13

== Personnel ==
- Jukka Pelkonen – lead vocals
- Markus Vanhala – lead guitar
- Joonas "Jope" Koto – rhythm guitar, clean vocals
- Aapo Koivisto – keyboards
- Erkki Silvennoinen – bass
- Jarmo Pikka – drums

Production

- Produced by Markus Vanhala and Teemu Aalto
- Mixed and mastered by Dan Swanö
- Artwork by Olli Lappalainen
