= Beyond (Omnium Gatherum album) =

Studio album by Omnium Gatherum
- Released: 22 February 2013
- Genre: Melodic death metal
- Length: 57:10
- Label: Lifeforce
- Producer: Markus Vanhala, Teemu Aalto

Omnium Gatherum chronology
| New World Shadows (2011) | Beyond (2013) | Grey Heavens (2016) |

Beyond is the sixth studio album by Finnish melodic death metal band Omnium Gatherum and their second record released on Lifeforce Records. It was released digitally worldwide on 22 February 2013 and physical CD was released in Finland, Germany, Switzerland and Australia on 22 February, in the rest of Europe on 25 February, and in North America on 5 March. the album was produced by Teemu Aalto and Sami Koivisto and recorded at Teemu Aalto Music Productions studio (except for drums, which was recorded at Nordic Audio Labs by Sami Koivisto). It was mixed and mastered by Dan Swanö at Unisound Studio. The album's artwork was created by Olli Lappalainen.

Beyond is one of the most anticipated releases by the band since they made their breakthrough with their previous album New World Shadows. As stated by guitarist Markus Vanhala on the band's official website "The album follows the good known path of New World Shadows and The Redshift but adds a lot of new flavours and spices to the good ol' melting pot to lift the band to a new heights." Markus also stated that Beyond is their most melodic and versatile album so far but still holds the brutal side in terms of Jukka Pelkonen's vocals. The basic theme of the album is about the culmination point of one's existence. It is a coming home story where the mysteries of duality are melted into oneness but without losing one single point of individuality along the arrival.

On 9 January 2013, the band released the teaser track "New Dynamic" on YouTube via Facebook page. The official music video for "The Unknowing" was released on 6 February 2013.

== Track listing ==
All lyrics are written by Jukka Pelkonen.

| No. | Title | Music | Length |
|---|---|---|---|
| 1. | "Luoto" | Markus Vanhala | 3:32 |
| 2. | "New Dynamic" | Vanhala | 4:56 |
| 3. | "In the Rim" | Vanhala | 4:52 |
| 4. | "Nightwalkers" | Vanhala | 8:15 |
| 5. | "Formidable" | Vanhala | 4:53 |
| 6. | "The Sonic Sign" | Vanhala, Joonas Koto | 4:35 |
| 7. | "Who Could Say" | Vanhala | 4:44 |
| 8. | "The Unknowing" | Vanhala | 5:57 |
| 9. | "Living in Me" | Vanhala | 4:40 |
| 10. | "White Palace" | Vanhala | 10:40 |
| Total length: | | | 57:10 |

Limited edition
| No. | Title | Writer(s) | Length |
|---|---|---|---|
| 11. | "Subdivisions" (Rush cover) | Geddy Lee, Alex Lifeson, Neil Peart | 5:33 |
| Total length: | | | 62:43 |

== Personnel ==
- Jukka Pelkonen – lead vocals
- Markus Vanhala – lead guitar
- Joonas "Jope" Koto – rhythm guitar, clean vocals
- Aapo Koivisto – keyboards
- Eerik Purdon – bass
- Erkki Silvennoinen – bass (credited, but did not play)
- Jarmo Pikka – drums

Production

- Produced by Markus Vanhala and Teemu Aalto
- Recorded by Dan Swanö, with drums recorded by Sami Koivisto
- Mixed and mastered by Dan Swanö
- Artwork by Olli Lappalainen
