= Jason Russo =

Jason Russo may refer to:

- Jason John Russo, former vocalist with the heavy metal band Herod
- Jason Sebastian Russo (born 1973), singer and guitarist with the psychedelic rock band Hopewell
