= Earth.Revolt =

Studio album by Deadlock
- Released: 27 June 2005
- Genres: Melodic black metal, melodic death metal
- Length: 54:11
- Language: English
- Label: Lifeforce Records
- Producers: D. Richter and Sebastian Reichl

Deadlock chronology
The Arrival (2002)	Earth.Revolt (2005)	Wolves (2007)

Professional ratings
Review scores
Source	Rating
AllMusic	3.5/5 stars
Metal.de	8/10
Punknews.org	3/5 stars

Earth.Revolt is the second full-length album by German heavy metal band Deadlock, released on 27 June 2005 through German record label Lifeforce Records. It is a concept album centering on the theme of Earth being exploited by mankind.

== Reception ==
AllMusic wrote: "The mammoth 'May Angels Come' is 11 minutes of classic metal riffs in the vein of Judas Priest and Iron Maiden before hitting a fine yet tame head-banging groove from the onset. Almost symphonic in its approach and meticulousness, the song is extremely soothing for a metal tune." PopMatters panned Earth.Revolt's production, while also calling the album "innocuously pleasant melodic death metal." Exclaim! wrote that the band "leech typical riffing and throw in a few metalcore breakdowns to confound the air of dull predictability."

== Track listing ==
1. "Demonic (Tonus Dibolus)" (intro) - 0:31
2. "10,000 Generations In Blood" - 8:04
3. "The Year Of The Crow" - 4:11
4. "Everlasting Pain" - 6:45
5. "Earth.Revolt" - 4:35
6. "More Tragedies To Come" - 6:03
7. "Awakened By Sirens" - 5:25
8. "Kingdom Of The Dead" - 5:36
9. "May Angles Come" - 11:12
10. "Harmonic" - 1:49

== Personnel ==
- Johannes Prem - Male/harsh vocals
- Sabine Scherer (Weniger) - Female/clean vocals
- Sebastian Reichl - Guitar
- Gert Rymen - Guitar
- Thomas Huschka - Bass
- Tobias Graf - Drums
