= Harbinger =

A harbinger is a forerunner or forewarning, but may also refer to:

== Companies ==
- Harbinger (company), an American automotive manufacturing company
- Harbinger Corp., an Internet-oriented business
- Harbinger Capital, a hedge fund
- Harbinger Knowledge Products, an eLearning products and content services company

== Fiction ==
=== Characters ===
- Harbinger (DC Comics), a character in Crisis on Infinite Earths
- Harbingers (Valiant Comics), fictional characters in Valiant Comics
- Harbinger, Earl a character in the Monster Hunter series by Larry Correia

=== Books and comics ===
- Harbinger (comic book), a comic book published by Valiant Comics
- Harbinger (novel), a 2005 novel in the Star Trek: Vanguard series by David Mack
- The Harbinger (novel), a 2011 novel by Jonathan Cahn
- Harbingers (novel), a 2006 novel by F. Paul Wilson

=== Film and television ===
- Harbinger (film), a 2016 American eco-thriller film
- "Harbinger" (Star Trek: Enterprise), a 2004 third-season episode of Star Trek: Enterprise
- "The Harbinger" (Star Wars: The Bad Batch)

== Games ==
- Harbinger (video game)
- Star Trek: Deep Space Nine: Harbinger, computer game
- Harbinger, product in the Dungeons & Dragons Miniatures Game series
- Harbinger, a starship in the game Star Wars: Knights of the Old Republic 2
- Harbinger, a playable character in the game Bloodline Champions
- Harbinger, a sentient starship in the Mass Effect series
- Harbinger, a soul of the mage class in the game Rift (video game)
- Harbinger, an allied support bomber aeroplan in the game Red Alert 3: Uprising
- Project Harbinger, a top-secret research program in the game series F.E.A.R.
- The Harbingers, an Australian video board game
- The Eleven Fatui Harbingers, the executive heads of the Fatui in the game Genshin Impact

== Music ==
- Harbinger (band), 1997 musical group formed in Berkeley, California
- Harbinger (album), a 2019 album by Arrival Of Autumn
- The Harbinger (album), a 2009 album by Molotov Solution
- Harbinger (Paula Cole album)
- Harbinger (Dan Seals album)
- "Harbinger", a track on the album Lowborn by Anberlin
- "Harbinger", a track on the album Nocturne by The Human Abstract
- "Harbinger", a track on the album Music of the Spheres by Mike Oldfield
- "Harbinger", a track on the album Armamentarium by Neaera
- "Harbinger", a track on the album Fatalism by Polaris
- "Harbinger", a track on the album Pacific Myth by Protest the Hero

== Periodicals ==
- Harbinger (zine), a philosophical publication
- The Harbinger, the Algonquin Regional High School newspaper
- The Harbinger, a 19th-century activist journal also known as The Phalanx

== Places ==
- Montes Harbinger, a cluster of mountains on the Moon
- Harbinger, North Carolina, an unincorporated community
- Harbinger, a former commune, now Harbin Hot Springs, a non-profit hot spring retreat and workshop center in Northern California

== Other uses ==
- Harbinger, original name of Norfolk, a ship involved in early colonial Australia (1801-1802)
- Harbinger (horse), thoroughbred racehorse
- Czerwiński-Shenstone Harbinger, a British sailplane, of which two were built
