= Cipher System / By Night =

EP by Cipher System and By Night
- Released: June 18, 2004
- Genre: Melodic death metal
- Length: 21:35
- Label: Lifeforce

By Night chronology
Cipher System / By Night (2004)	Burn the Flags (2005)

Cipher System chronology
Cipher System / By Night (2004)	Central Tunnel Eight (2004)

Cipher System / By Night is an EP by the Swedish metal bands Cipher System and By Night. It was released in 2004. According to Cipher System member Henric, its recording was rushed and they were not happy with the result.

== Track listing ==
1. "What If" - 3:30
2. "Receive, Retrieve and Escalate" - 3:50
3. "Sufferstream" - 3:19
4. "Lamentation" - 4:33
5. "Unseen Oppression" - 3:26
6. "Obsessed to Hate" - 2:57

Tracks one to three are by Cipher System. Tracks four to six are from By Night.

== Musicians ==
Cipher System:

- Daniel - vocals
- Johan - Lead Guitar
- Magnus - Rhythm Guitar
- Henric - Bass
- Pontus - drums
- Peter - Electronics

By Night:

- Adrian Westin - vocals
- André Gonzales - Lead and rhythm guitar
- Simon Wien - Rhythm and lead guitar
- Henrik Persson - Bass
- Per Qvarnström - drums
