= Wolves (Deadlock album) =

Studio album by Deadlock
- Released: 29 May 2007
- Recorded: September-November 2006
- Genres: Melodic death metal, thrash metal
- Length: 46:36
- Label: Lifeforce Records
- Producer: Sebastian Reichl

Deadlock chronology
Earth.Revolt (2005)	Wolves (2007)	Manifesto (2008)

Professional ratings
Review scores
Source	Rating
AllMusic	3/5
Blabbermouth.net	8.5/10
Metal Covenant	8.5/10
Metal Injection	7/10
Metal Reviews	70/100
Metal Storm	8.4/10
Metal Temple	3/10
Metal.de	8/10

Wolves is the third full-length album by melodic death metal band Deadlock. It was released in 2007, and features techno beats and symphonic black metal elements added to their sound.

== Track listing ==
All music by Sebastian Reichl, Tobias Graf and Sabine Weniger
All lyrics by Johannes Prem

1. "World Domination" (intro) - 0:47
2. "We Shall All Bleed" - 6:03
3. "Code of Honor" - 4:26
4. "Losers' Ballet" - 6:38
5. "Dark Cell" - 4:23
6. "Crown of Creation" - 4:50
7. "End Begins" - 4:34
8. "As Words to Bullets" - 3:43
9. "Praeludium II" (instrumental) - 1:32
10. "Bloodpact" - 5:51
11. "To Where the Skies Are Blue" - 3:49
12. "Code of Honor" (Clubremixxx) (limited edition bonus track) - 4:28

== Personnel ==
- Johannes Prem - male/harsh vocals
- Sabine Weniger - female/clean vocals
- Sebastian Reichl - guitar
- Gert Rymen - guitar
- Thomas Huschka - bass
- Tobias Graf - drums
