= By Night =

Swedish metal band

- Origin: Falkenberg, Sweden
- Genres: Metalcore, melodic death metal
- Years active: 1999–present
- Label: Lifeforce
- Members: Christoffer Andersson; André Gonzales; Henrik Persson; Per Qvarnström; Martin Karlsson
- Past members: Adrian Westin; Simon Wien; Markus Wesslén
- Website: bynightonline.com

By Night is a Swedish metalcore band from Falkenberg, formed by André Gonzales (guitar), Simon Wien (guitar), and Per Qvarnström (drums) in 1999. After several line-up changes, bassist Henrik Persson joined and stayed, later on singer Christoffer Andersson as well. Two demos were recorded, By Night (2000) and Derelict (2001).

In 2002, Christoffer Andersson left and was replaced by Adrian Westin, singer of the band Aggressive Serpent (now called Trendkill). The band recorded the demo Lamentation, and was voted as the best unsigned band by Monster Magazine and Close-Up. In 2004, they signed with Lifeforce Records and released a split EP with Cipher System, Cipher System / By Night.

Since then they have released two albums, Burn the Flags in 2005 and A New Shape of Desperation in 2006. In 2005, they toured Europe in the We Are the Enemy Tour (with Destiny and Deadsoil) and the Monster Mosh Down Tour (with Ektomorf, Disbelief, and Betzefer). Shortly after the release of Burn the Flags, Simon Wien quit. Henrik Persson took his place as a guitarist and bassist Markus Wesslén (from Trendkill) joined. After the release of their second album they went on a third tour through Europe with fellow Lifeforce band Fall of Serenity.

In 2007, they played at the With Full Force festival along with bands Slayer, Children of Bodom, Korn and Amon Amarth. A third album was to be released in 2008.

== Band members ==
=== current ===
- Christoffer Andersson - lead vocals (1999-2002, 2012-present)
- André Gonzales - guitar, backing vocals (1999-present)
- Henrik Persson - guitar (2006-present), bass (1999-2006)
- Per Qvarnström - drums (1999-present)
- Martin Karlsson - bass (2012-present)

=== past ===
- Adrian Westin - lead vocals (2002-2012)
- Simon Wien - guitar (1999-2006)
- Markus Wesslén - bass (2006-2012)

== Discography ==
- Cipher System / By Night (2004)
- Burn the Flags (2005)
- A New Shape of Desperation (2006)
- Sympathy for Tomorrow (2012)
