= State of Decay (disambiguation) =

State of Decay is a series of third-person survival horror video games.

State of Decay may also refer to:

- State of Decay (video game), the first game in the State of Decay series
- State of Decay (Doctor Who), a 1980 Doctor Who serial
- State of Decay (album), an album by Society Burning
- State of Decay (Parralox album), an album by Parralox
- "State of Decay", a song on the Deadlock album Bizarro World
