= A New Shape of Desperation =

Studio album by By Night
- Released: September 25, 2006
- Recorded: May and June, 2006
- Genres: Metalcore, extreme metal
- Length: 36:36
- Label: Lifeforce

By Night chronology
Burn the Flags (2005)	A New Shape of Desperation (2006)

A New Shape of Desperation the second full album by the extreme metal band By Night.

== Tracks ==
1. "(It Starts Within)" – 0:32
2. "The Truth Is Sold" – 3:32
3. "People Like You" – 4:41
4. "Through Ashes We Crawl" – 3:33
5. "Same Old Story" – 4:06
6. "Dead Eyes See No Future" – 2:31
7. "Walls of Insecure" – 4:12
8. "Idiot" – 0:55
9. "Forsaken Love" – 4:46
10. "Cursed by the Thought" – 4:23
11. "Time Is Running Out" – 3:25

== Personnel ==
- Adrian Westin – vocals
- André Gonzales – Lead and rhythm guitar
- Henrik Persson – Rhythm and lead guitar
- Markus Wesslén – Bass
- Per Qvarnström – drums
