= Transmetropolitan (album) =

2007 studio album by War from a Harlots Mouth

Studio album by War from a Harlots Mouth
- Released: 18 September 2007 (Germany); 21 November 2008 (worldwide)
- Recorded: 2007
- Genre: Deathcore, mathcore
- Length: 39:56
- Label: Lifeforce

War from a Harlots Mouth chronology
Falling Upstairs (2006)	Transmetropolitan (2007)	In Shoals (2009)

Professional ratings
Review scores
Source	Rating
Allmusic	3.5/5 stars
Visions	5/12
Zero	5/10 stars

Transmetropolitan is the debut album by German metal band War from a Harlots Mouth. It was released in Germany on September 18, 2007, and released worldwide on November 21, 2008, through Lifeforce Records. It is the last release with vocalist Steffan Winopal.

== Track listing ==
No.	Title	Length
1.	"How to Disconnect from Your Social Surroundings in Half an Hour"	1:59
2.	"Heeey...Let's Start a Band"	3:11
3.	"The District Attorneys are Selling Your Blood"	2:46
4.	"Trife Life"	1:24
5.	"Fighting Wars with Keyboards"	1:51
6.	"Mulder"	7:05
7.	"Thousand Complaints, One Answer"	3:28
8.	"If You Want to Blame Us for Something Wrong, Please Abuse this Song"	1:22
9.	"Riding Dead Horses Is a Fucking Curse"	3:11
10.	"Transmetropolitan"	3:36
11.	"And in the Right to Make Mistakes, We May Lose Everything and Start Again" (Ends at 2:40, followed by 7:20 of silence, and a 6-second hidden track at 10:00.)	10:06

== Personnel ==
- Daniel Oberländer - guitars
- Simon Hawemann - guitars
- Filip Hantusch - bass
- Paul Seidel - drums
- Steffen Winopal - vocals
