= Burn the Flags =

Studio album by By Night
- Released: February 22, 2005
- Recorded: July 2004
- Genres: Metalcore, extreme metal
- Length: 35:42
- Label: Lifeforce

By Night chronology
Split (2004)	Burn the Flags (2005)	A New Shape of Desperation (2006)

Burn the Flags the first full album by the extreme metal band By Night.

== Tracks ==
1. Between The Lines - 4:30
2. Part of Perfection - 3:07
3. One and the Same - 3:45
4. Raise Your Voice - 3:59
5. Completed - 5:35
6. Behind in Silence - 4:28
7. Unseen Oppression - 3:23
8. At the End of the Day - 3:26
9. Dead or Confused - 3:29

== Musicians ==
- Adrian Westin - vocals
- André Gonzales - lead and rhythm guitar
- Simon Wien - rhythm and lead guitar
- Henrik Persson - bass
- Per Qvarnström - drums
