= Manifesto (Deadlock album) =

Studio album by Deadlock
- Released: 17 November 2008 (Germany, Austria, Switzerland, Japan); 20 January 2009 (United States)
- Genres: Melodic death metal, experimental metal
- Length: 52:48
- Language: English
- Label: Lifeforce Records
- Producer: Sebastian Reichl

Deadlock chronology
Wolves (2007)	Manifesto (2008)	Bizarro World (2011)

Professional ratings
Review scores
Source	Rating
AllMusic	3/5 stars
Exclaim!	(generally terrible)
Metal Hammer	6/7
Metal.de	9/10 stars
MetalSucks	3.5/5 stars

Manifesto is the fourth full-length studio album by German melodic death metal band Deadlock. It was released by Lifeforce Records on 17 November 2008 in Germany, Austria, Switzerland, and Japan, and on 20 January 2009 in the United States. A box set limited to 1000 copies with two bonus tracks and several items was released as well.

Manifesto is a concept album about animal rights and veganism. Musically, the album marked a change to a more experimental style by the band, incorporating sections of techno, rap, saxophone and orchestral arrangements into its melodic death metal style.

The track, "The Brave/Agony Applause", is the first single off the album and has a music video. Manifesto was promoted by playing one new song off the album each day on their MySpace until its European release. It is Deadlock's last release to feature longtime band member Thomas Huschka on bass.

== Critical reception ==
Manifesto received polarized reviews from music critics. While some had unfavorably critiqued its highly experimental approach, others praised its departure from the melodic death metal style which was prominent during the mid-2000s. Thorsten Zahn of Metal Hammer stood out the band's "uncompromising work" and went on to say that "Manifesto is undoubtedly the best melodic death metal album by a German band." Eduardo Rivadavia of AllMusic was not as enthusiastic however, stating that despite its "oftentimes brave and unquestionably well-intentioned efforts", the diverse influences "feel too forced and scattered [...] to shake up those tired metalcore formulas".

== Track listing ==
No.	Title	Lyrics	Music	Length
1.	"The Moribund Choir vs. The Trumpets Of Armageddon (Intro)"		Reichl/Graf	1:10
2.	"Martyr To Science"	Prem	Reichl/Graf	5:13
3.	"Slaughter’s Palace"	Prem	Reichl/Graf	4:22
4.	"The Brave / Agony Applause"	Prem	Reichl/Graf/Scherer	4:03
5.	"Deathrace"	Prem	Reichl/Graf	6:46
6.	"Fire At Will"	Prem	Reichl/Graf	4:53
7.	"Seal Slayer"	Prem	Reichl/Graf	5:39
8.	"Manifesto (Instrumental)"		Reichl/Graf	2:24
9.	"Dying Breed"	Prem	Reichl/Graf	5:38
10.	"Altruism"	Reichl	Reichl/Scherer	3:03
11.	"Temple Of Love (The Sisters of Mercy Cover)"	Eldritch	Eldritch	3:06
12.	"The Brave / Agony Applause (Acoustic Live) (bonus track)"	Prem	Reichl/Graf/Scherer	3:35
13.	"Martyr to Spam (Planetakis vs. Deadlock) (bonus track)"	Prem	Reichl/Graf	2:36
Total length:				52:48

== Personnel ==
Band members

- Johannes Prem - harsh male vocals
- Sabine Weniger - clean female vocals
- Sebastian Reichl - lead and rhythm guitars
- Gert Ryman - rhythm guitar
- Thomas Huschka - bass guitar
- Tobias Graf - drums

Guest/session musician

- "Warpath" - 1st rap verse on "Deathrace"
- "Sick Since" from Lost Children of Babylon - 2nd rap verse on "Deathrace"
- Michael Bernhard Gerber - saxophone solo on "Fire at Will"
- Christian Älvestam (Scar Symmetry) - guest clean male vocals on "Dying Breed"
- Morten Loewe - drums on "Altrusim", drum co-producer
- DJ Morgoth - remix of "Martyr to Science" (Planetakis vs. Deadlock)

Crew

- Sebastian Reichl - recording, producing, engineering, mixing and mastering on "The Brave / Agony Applause (Live Acoustic Version)", mastering on "Martyr to Spam"
- Jacob Hansen - mixing, mastering
- Michael Popp - additional programming on "The Moribund Choir Vs. The Trumpets of Armageddon"
- "The Hitfarmers" - production, scratches, mixing on "Deathrace"
- Adam Wentworth - art direction, design, illustration
- Jason Pereira - art direction
