= Harbinger (comics) =

Harbinger, in comics, may refer to:

- Harbinger (DC Comics), a character in Crisis on Infinite Earths as well as in the Arrow TV series
- Harbinger of Apocalypse, a fictional character in Cable from Marvel Comics
- Harbinger, a name used in Valiant Comics:
  - Harbinger (comic book), a comic book published by Valiant Comics
  - Harbingers (Valiant Comics), fictional characters in Valiant Comics
  - Harbinger Resistance, a fictional organisation in titles from Valiant Comics

== See also ==
- Harbinger (disambiguation)
