= Stuck Here on Snakes Way =

Studio album by Omnium Gatherum
- Released: 2 April 2007
- Recorded: November 2006
- Studio: Southeast Studios in Karhula, Finland
- Genre: Melodic death metal
- Length: 56:46
- Label: Candlelight
- Producer: Teemu Aalto

Omnium Gatherum chronology
Years in Waste (2004)	Stuck Here on Snakes Way (2007)	The Redshift (2008)

Professional ratings
Review scores
Source	Rating
AllMusic	3/5 stars

Stuck Here on Snakes Way is the third studio album by Finnish melodic death metal band Omnium Gatherum, released in 2007. It is the band's first release on Candlelight Records and the first to feature Jukka Pelkonen on vocals and Aapo Koivisto on keyboards.

== Track listing ==
All lyrics written by Jukka Pelkonen.

No.	Title	Length
1.	"The Snake and the Way"	0:45
2.	"Into Sea"	3:36
3.	"Dysnomia"	3:10
4.	"A-Part of God"	3:45
5.	"Undertaker"	4:57
6.	"Bastard-O"	2:47
7.	"The Third Flame"	3:54
8.	"Just Signs"	3:30
9.	"Truth"	2:58
10.	"Drudgery"	4:46
11.	"In Sane World"	4:12
12.	"Spiritual"	6:08

Digital release (available on iTunes, Spotify, Rdio, Sony Music, etc.)
No.	Title	Length
1.	"A-Part of God" (Mislabeled as "The Snake and the Way")	3:45
2.	"Bastard-O" (Mislabeled as "Into Sea")	2:47
3.	"Drudgery" (Mislabeled as "Dysnomia")	4:46
4.	"Dysnomia" (Mislabeled as "A-Part of God")	3:10
5.	"In Sane World" (Mislabeled as "Undertaker")	4:12
6.	"Into Sea" (Mislabeled as "Bastard-O")	3:36
7.	"Just Signs" (Mislabeled as "The Third Flame")	3:30
8.	"Spiritual" (Mislabeled as "Just Signs")	6:08
9.	"The Snake and the Way" (Mislabeled as "Truth")	0:45
10.	"The Third Flame" (Mislabeled as "Drudgery")	3:54
11.	"Truth" (Mislabeled as "In Sane World")	2:58
12.	"Undertaker" (Mislabeled as "Spiritual)	4:57

== Credits ==
- Jukka Pelkonen – vocals
- Markus Vanhala – guitar
- Harri Pikka – guitar
- Janne Markkanen – bass
- Aapo Koivisto – keyboards
- Jarmo Pikka – drums
