= Origin (Omnium Gatherum album) =

Studio album by Omnium Gatherum
- Released: 5 November 2021
- Recorded: 2021
- Genre: Melodic death metal
- Length: 49:42
- Label: Century Media
- Producer: Markus Vanhala

Omnium Gatherum chronology
| The Burning Cold (2018) | Origin (2021) | May the Bridges We Burn Light the Way (2025) |

Singles from Origin
- 1. "Paragon" Released: 27 August 2021; 2. "Reckoning" Released: 22 September 2021; 3. "Fortitude" Released: 14 October 2021; 4. "Unity" Released: 5 November 2021

Professional ratings
Review scores
| Source | Rating |
|---|---|
| Metal Injection | 7.5/10 |
| Sonic Perspectives | 9.3/10 |
| Tuonela Magazine | 8/10 |

Origin is the ninth studio album by Finnish melodic death metal band Omnium Gatherum. It was released on 5 November 2021 via Century Media Records. The band toured for the album in February and March 2022 in North America, supported by Allegaeon and Black Crown Initiate, and from September to November 2022 in Europe, as special guests in the Veleno Across Europe Tour by Fleshgod Apocalypse.

== Track listing ==
Origin track listing
| No. | Title | Length |
|---|---|---|
| 1. | "Emergence" | 2:35 |
| 2. | "Prime" | 5:23 |
| 3. | "Paragon" | 4:14 |
| 4. | "Reckoning" | 5:15 |
| 5. | "Fortitude" | 6:21 |
| 6. | "Friction" | 4:49 |
| 7. | "Tempest" | 5:57 |
| 8. | "Unity" | 6:19 |
| 9. | "Solemn" | 8:49 |
| Total length: | | 49:42 |

Bonus track
| No. | Title | Length |
|---|---|---|
| 10. | "In Front of Me" | 4:46 |
| Total length: | | 54:28 |

== Personnel ==
Omnium Gatherum

- Jukka Pelkonen – vocals
- Markus Vanhala – guitars
- Aapo Koivisto – keyboards
- Mikko Kivistö – bass
- Atte Pesonen – drums

Production

- Produced by Markus Vanhala
- Mixed by Jens Bogren
- Mastered by Tony Lindgren
- Artwork by Olli Lappalainen

== Charts ==
Chart performance for Origin
| Chart (2021) | Peak position |
|---|---|
| Finnish Albums (Suomen virallinen lista) | 5 |
| German Albums (Offizielle Top 100) | 92 |
| Swiss Albums (Schweizer Hitparade) | 56 |
