= Bizarro World (album) =

Studio album by Deadlock
- Released: February 28, 2011
- Recorded: August–December 2010
- Studio: Slaughter's Palace Studio
- Genres: Melodic death metal, melodic metalcore
- Length: 40:16
- Label: Lifeforce
- Producer: Sebastian Reichl

Deadlock chronology
Manifesto (2008)	Bizarro World (2011)	The Arsonist (2013)

Professional ratings
Review scores
Source	Rating
Blabbermouth.net	2.5/10
Dead Rhetoric	8/10
Eternal Terror	3.5/6
Femme Metal	85/100
Metal.de	10/10
Metalzone	70%
PopMatters	6/10
SputnikMusic	3.5/5

Bizarro World is the fifth full-length studio album by Deadlock. It was released on February 28, 2011 and was the last album to feature Johannes Prem as harsh vocalist and Gert Rymen as rhythm guitarist who had left in 2011 and 2013 respectively, also it was the only album to feature John Gahlert on bass til he switched to harsh vocals to replace Johannes Prem. A music video was released for the song "Virus Jones".

== Track listing ==
All lyrics are written by Johannes Prem.

No.	Title	Music	Length
1.	"Virus Jones"	Sebastian Reichl	4:59
2.	"State Of Decay"	Sebastian Reichl	3:43
3.	"Falling Skywards"	Sebastian Reichl	4:21
4.	"Earthlings"	Sebastian Reichl	3:41
5.	"You Left Me Dead"	Sebastian Reichl	4:11
6.	"Brutal Romance"	Sebastian Reichl	4:08
7.	"Alienation"	Sebastian Reichl	1:42
8.	"Renegade"	Sebastian Reichl	3:25
9.	"htrae"	Sebastian Reichl	4:48
10.	"Bizarro World"	Sebastian Reichl	2:11
11.	"Paranoia Extravaganza"	Hubert Zaindl; Sabine Scherer	3:07
Total length:			40:16

Digipak Bonus Tracks
No.	Title	Length
12.	"State Of Decay" (S.U.N. Project Remix)	4:21
13.	"Virus Jones" (Trickpop Remix)	4:12
Total length:		48:49

== Credits ==
Deadlock

- Harsh vocals – Johannes Prem
- Vocals – Sabine Scherer
- Guitar, Keyboard, Programming – Sebastian Reichl
- Guitar – Gert Rymen
- Bass – John Gahlert
- Drums – Tobias Graf

Production

- Recording – Sebastian Reichl
- Mixing – Flo Nowak
- Mastering – Alex Kloss
- Artwork – Sons of Nero

Guest musicians

- Piano, Programming – Hubert Zaindl on "Paranoia Extravaganza"
