= Light Pupil Dilate =

American rock trio

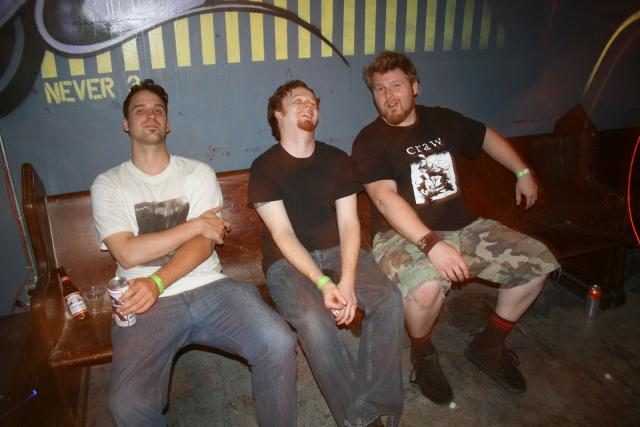

Background information
- Origin: Atlanta, Georgia, United States
- Genres: Post-punk, punk rock, surf rock, experimental rock, heavy metal
- Years active: 2001–present
- Label: www.organismrecords.net
- Members: Eric Searle; Mike Chvasta; Michael Green
- Website: www.lightpupildilate.com

Light Pupil Dilate was an American rock trio from Atlanta, Georgia that formed in 2001. They often went by the acronym LPD. Their sound was made by mixing post-punk, hardcore punk, metal, and space rock. They played their final show on July 30, 2010, at The Drunken Unicorn in Atlanta, Ga.

== Members ==
- Eric Searle - guitar, vocals
- Mike Chvasta - bass, vocals
- Michael Green - drums

== Touring and shows ==
The band went on tours of the eastern US in 2004, 2005, and 2007 playing with Harlots, Taming the Shrew, Engineer, Nov.5,1955, and many others. They have shared stages with Dead and Gone, Submission Hold, Totimoshi, Kylesa, Meatjack, Today is the Day, Mixel Pixel, Sleepytime Gorilla Museum, Skeleton Key, Withered, Mastodon, All that Remains, Burnt by the Sun, Cream Abdul Babar, Cutthroats 9, American Heritage and Teeth of the Hydra.

== Publications ==
LPD has been in many publications throughout the years garnering high praise from critics and fans alike. They have been critically acclaimed in publications such as Metal Maniacs, Creative Loafing, Southeastern Performer, Rock Sound Magazine, Decibel Magazine, Outburn Magazine, and Revolver.

== MetroTrack Station Mastering//Recording/Production ==
Eric Searle operates MetroTrack Station sound studio Artists/Clients:

Mourdella, Mastodon, Get Damned, Dead Register, Boondak Syndicate, Palaces, Red Rocket Deluxe, Light Pupil Dilate, Magnificent Bastard, Loud Packets, Iron Whip, Night Time.

== Discography ==
- Cascades (Vert Records, 2003)
- Snake Wine (Lifeforce Records, 2007)
