= Deadlock (band) =

German metal band

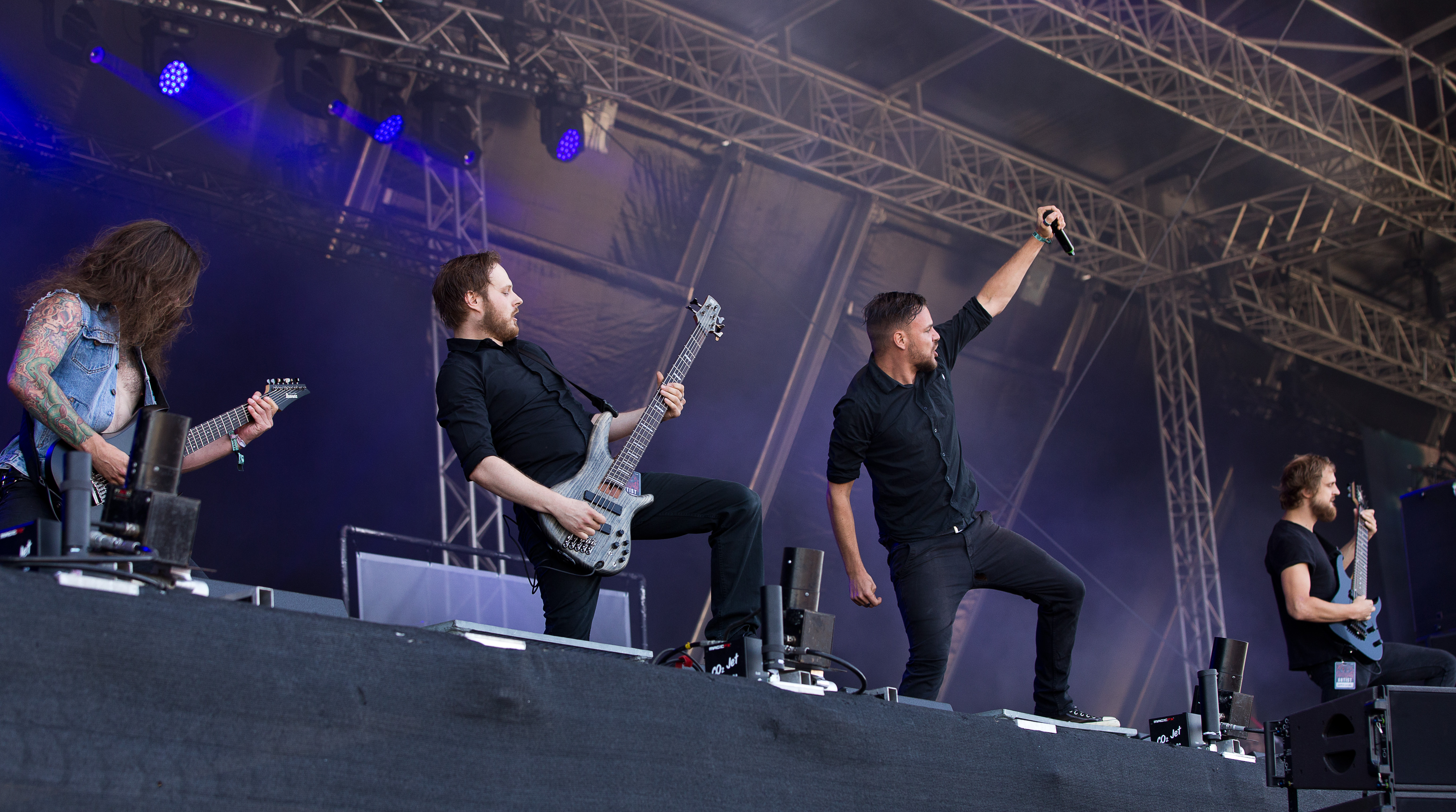
- Deadlock performing at Rockharz Open Air in 2016

Background information
- Origin: Schwarzenfeld, Bavaria, Germany
- Genres: Melodic death metal, metalcore
- Years active: 1997–present
- Labels: Winter, Lifeforce, Napalm
- Members: Sebastian Reichl; Sabine Scherer; Stephan Fimmers; Alexander Finzl; Maximilian Tofelde; Dave Grunewald
- Past members: "Mike"; Hans-Georg Bartmann; Thomas Gschwendner; Thomas Huschka; Johannes Prem; Gert Rymen; Tobias Graf; John Gahlert; Ferdinand Rewicki; Werner Riedl; Christian Simmerl; Margie Gerlitz
- Website: deadlock-official.com

Deadlock is a German heavy metal band from Schwarzenfeld, Bavaria. The band consists of founding member Sebastian Reichl and singer Sabine Scherer.

== History ==
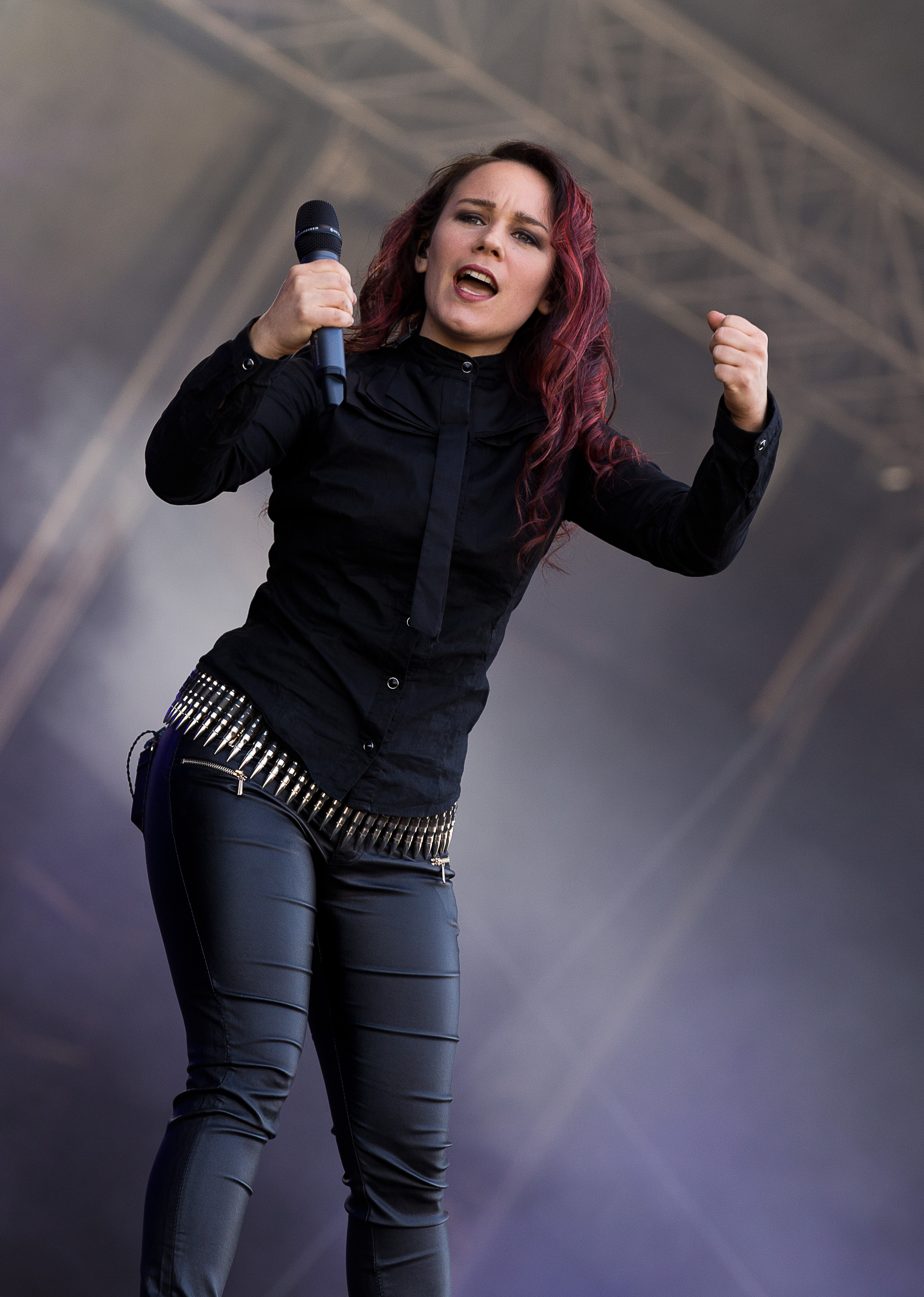
Margie Gerlitz at the Rockharz 2016

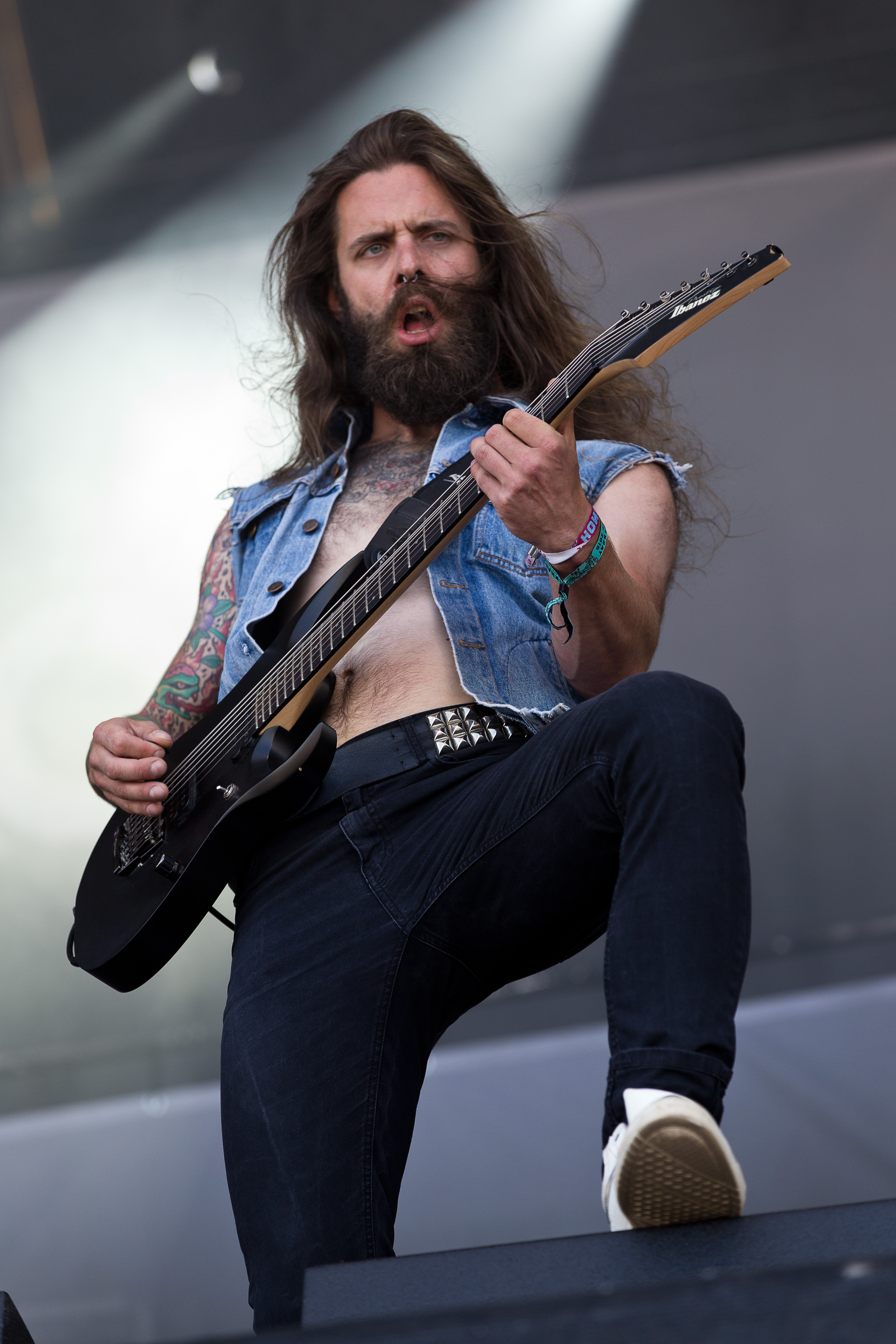
Ferdinand Rewicki at the Rockharz 2016

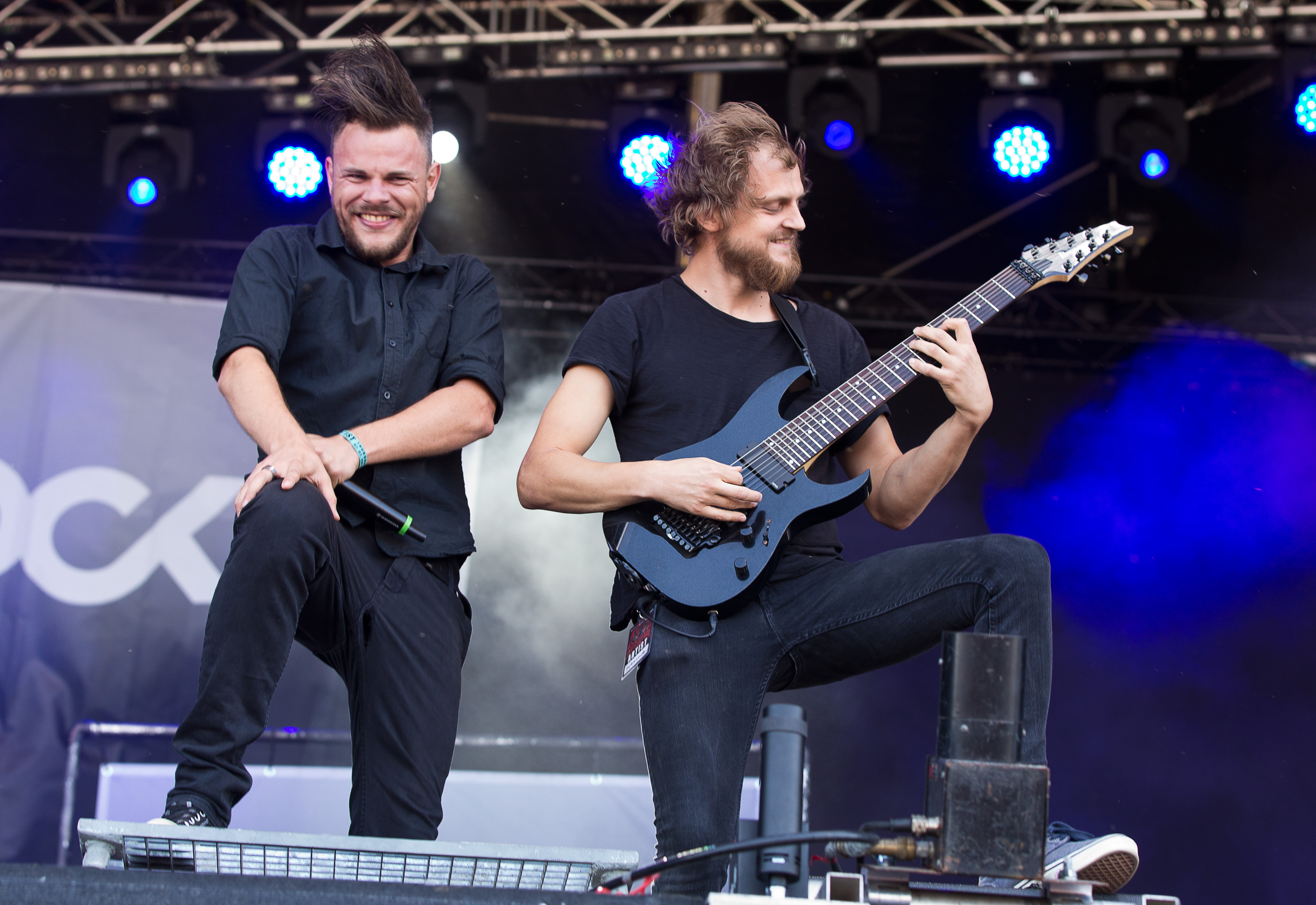
John Gahlert and guitarist Sebastian Reichl at the Rockharz 2016

=== Early days (1997–2001) ===
Vocalist Johannes Prem, guitarist Sebastian Reichl, and drummer Tobias Graf formed Deadlock in 1997 as a hardcore band. They released the 7" vinyl Deadlock in 1999. They released the EP I'll Wake You, When Spring Awakes in 2000.

=== The Arrival and Earth. Revolt (2002–2006) ===
In 2002, they released their first album, The Arrival. The album featured keyboards, orchestral elements and guest clean vocals from Sabine Scherer.

Their second album, Earth. Revolt, was released in 2005. The band had expanded to a six-piece with guitarist Gert Rymen and clean vocalist Sabine Scherer now a full-time member. The album featured a cleaner, more technical style and employed clean vocals by Scherer.

=== Wolves and Manifesto (2007–2009) ===
Their third album, Wolves, was released in 2007, and featured prominently electronic and trance influences. They shot their first video, for the track "Code of Honor". They toured Europe in support of Wolves alongside Neaera and Maintain.

Their fourth album, Manifesto, was released in November 2008. (January 2009 in North America) The song "Deathrace" features rapping, while the song "Dying Breed" features clean vocals from former Scar Symmetry vocalist Christian Älvestam, and the song "Fire At Will" has a saxophone solo. It includes a cover of The Sisters of Mercy's "Temple of Love". The track "The Brave/Agony Applause" was the album's first single and had a music video. They promoted Manifesto by playing one new song of the album each day on their MySpace until its European release.

Deadlock announced on a MySpace bulletin on December 12, 2008, that they had parted ways with bassist Thomas Huschka, citing "musical and personal differences". On May 7, 2009, they announced John Gahlert as their new bassist.

=== Bizarro World (2010–2011) ===
Deadlock released their fifth album, Bizarro World, in February 2011.

On 2010, Scherer was guest vocalist and Sebastian Reichl was guest guitarist in the album Invictus by the German band Heaven Shall Burn in the song "Given in Death".

=== Line up changes and The Arsonist (2011–2013) ===
On October 26, 2011, it was announced that founding vocalist/lyricist Joe Prem had left the band after 14 years. On the 21st November 2011, Deadlock announced via their Facebook page that bassist John Gahlert would be the new harsh vocalist, having performed on occasion when Prem was unable to play. Bass duties would be handled by Ferdinand Rewicki, who had toured with the band as driver, tour manager, and "merch guy".

On 8 February 2013, it was announced that guitarist Gert Rymen had left the band, reducing the lineup to a five-piece. On March 21 of the same year, the band signed to Napalm Records through whom they announced they would release their next album. It would be the first release with Gahlert on "harsh" vocals and Rewicki on bass and rhythm guitar.

The band released its sixth full-length album, The Arsonist, on July 26, 2013.

=== The Re-Arrival, and Hybris ===
April 28, 2014, it was announced via the band's Facebook page that Tobias Graf had departed the band, leaving Sebastian Reichl as the only remaining original member. On September 4, it was revealed that Graf had died at the age of 35.

Deadlock released The Re-Arrival in August 2014, an album of remakes of songs from earlier albums. In September, it was announced that Scherer was beginning her maternity leave, and the band was temporarily replacing her with Margie Gerlitz. On April 28, 2016, it was announced that she was departing the band permanently to spend more time with her family, while announcing that Gerlitz would become the new clean vocalist.

In May 2016, the band announced their new album, Hybris, along with the lead single "Berserk". The album was released on July 8, 2016.

=== Return of Scherer and "Blackest Black" (2024–present) ===
On September 28, 2024, the band released the single "Blackest Black", their first release in eight years. It marked the return of former clean vocalist Sabine Scherer, and the confirmed exit of Gerlitz. The release indicated that Scherer and Reichl are the only active members of the band.

== Musical style ==
Deadlock incorporate melodic death metal as well as some metalcore aspects. What makes Deadlock different is the combination of death growls and female clean vocals. Also included in their sound are techno sections, often used as intros but sometimes used as a whole breakdown section, where a complete genre change takes place. The band used C tuning on 6-string guitars, until the release of The Arsonist in 2013 when they began using drop F tuning on 7-string guitars, strongly influenced from the popular djent movement.

Deadlock started as a vegan straight edge band and, while all its members are still vegan (as of 2019), they began to include non-straight edge people since John Gahlert joined. Many of their lyrics (particularly the songs on Manifesto) are about animal rights.

== Band members ==
=== Current ===
- Sebastian Reichl – lead guitar, keyboards and backing vocals (1997–present)
- Sabine Scherer – clean vocals and keyboards (2002–2016, 2025–present)
- Stephan Kronzucker - bass (2026-present)
- Alexander Finzl - drums (2026-present)
- Maximilian Tofelde - rhythm guitar (2026-present)
- Dave Grunewald - vocals (2026-present)

=== Former ===
- "Mike" – bass (1997–1999)
- Hans-Georg Bartmann – bass (1999–2002)
- Thomas Gschwendner – rhythm guitar (2002–2004)
- Thomas Huschka – bass (2002–2008)
- Johannes Prem – harsh vocals, lyrics (1997–2011)
- Gert Rymen – rhythm guitar (2004–2013)
- Tobias Graf – drums (1997–April 2014, died September 2014)
- Margie Gerlitz – clean vocals (2016–2024)
- John Gahlert – harsh vocals (2011–2021), bass (2009–2011)
- Ferdinand Rewicki – rhythm guitar and backing vocals (2013–2024), bass (2011–2015)
- Werner Riedl – drums (2014–2024)
- Christian Simmerl – bass (2015–2024)

== Discography ==
Deadlock discography
- Studio albums: 8
- Extended plays: 1
- Singles: 2
- Music videos: 5
- Split albums: 1

=== Studio albums ===
List of studio albums, with selected chart positions
Title	Details	Peak
Title	Details	GER
The Arrival	Released: December 27, 2002; Label: Winter; Formats: CD	—
Earth.Revolt	Released: June 27, 2005; Label: Lifeforce, Deadbutcher; Formats: CD, LP, digital download	—
Wolves	Released: May 29, 2007; Label: Lifeforce; Formats: CD, digital download	—
Manifesto	Released: November 17, 2008; Label: Lifeforce; Formats: CD, digital download	—
Bizarro World	Released: February 25, 2011; Label: Lifeforce; Formats: CD, digital download	61
The Arsonist	Released: July 26, 2013; Label: Napalm; Formats: CD, LP, digital download	82
The Re-Arrival	Released: August 15, 2014; Label: Lifeforce; Formats: CD, digital download	—
Hybris	Released: July 8, 2016; Label: Napalm; Formats: CD, digital download	—
"—" denotes a recording that did not chart or was not released in that territory.

=== Demos ===
Title	Details
Deadlock	Released: 1999; Label: independent; Formats: 7"

=== EPs ===
Title	Details
I'll Wake You, When Spring Awakes	Released: 2000; Label: Winter; Formats: CD
Buried Alive	Released: 2025; Label: Independent; Formats: Digital

=== Singles ===
Title	Details
State of Decay	Released: February 4, 2011; Label: Lifeforce; Formats: digital download
Blackest Black	Released: 2024; Label: Slaughter's Palace; Formats: digital download
Acedia ~ The Downfall's Symphony	Released: 2024; Label: Independent; Formats: digital download

=== Splits ===
Title	Album details
Deadlock / Six Reasons to Kill with Six Reasons to Kill	Released: 2003; Label: Winter; Formats: CD

=== Music videos ===
Title	From the album
"Code of Honor"	Wolves
"The Brave / Agony Applause"	Manifesto
"Virus Jones"	Bizarro World
"I'm Gone"	The Arsonist
"The Great Pretender"	The Arsonist
"Renegade"	The Re-Arrival
"Awakened By Sirens"	The Re-Arrival
"Berserk"	Hybris
"Backstory Wound"	Hybris
