= Omnium Gatherum =

Finnish melodic death metal band

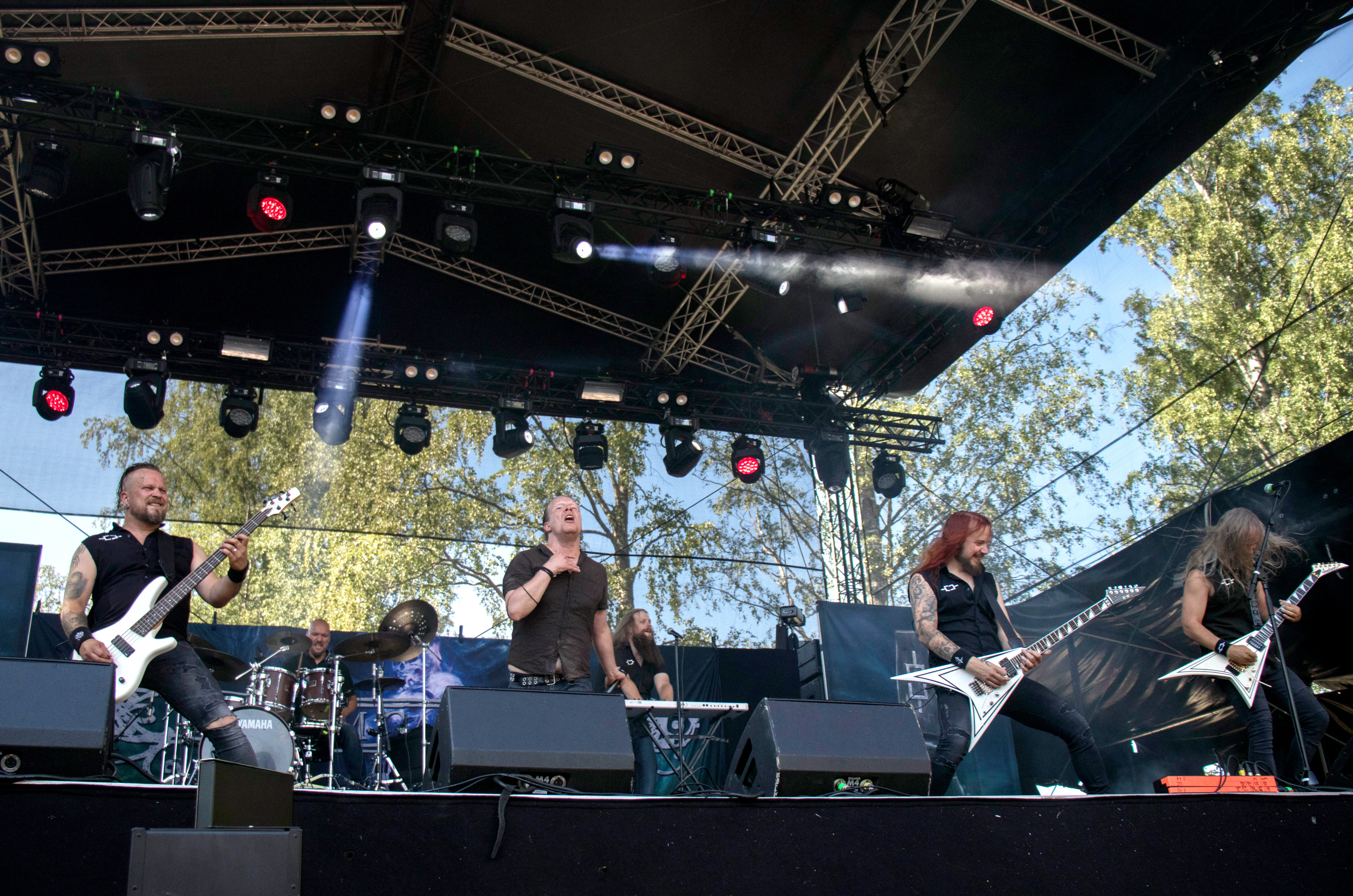
- Omnium Gatherum in 2019

Background information
- Origin: Karhula, Finland
- Genre: Melodic death metal
- Years active: 1996–present
- Labels: Nuclear Blast, Candlelight, Lifeforce, Century Media
- Members: Markus Vanhala; Aapo Koivisto; Jukka Pelkonen; Mikko Kivistö; Atte Pesonen; Joonas "Jope" Koto
- Past members: Jarmo Pikka; Erkki Silvennoinen; Tuomo Latvala; Nick Cordle
- Website: omniumgatherum.org

Omnium Gatherum is a Finnish melodic death metal band from Karhula, founded in the autumn of 1996. Although the band mainly plays melodic death metal, much of their work shows progressive metal influences, especially in later albums. Their music is influenced by Gothenburg-style bands such as At the Gates, In Flames, Dissection, and Dark Tranquillity, but also Iron Maiden, Death, Anathema, and Megadeth among others.

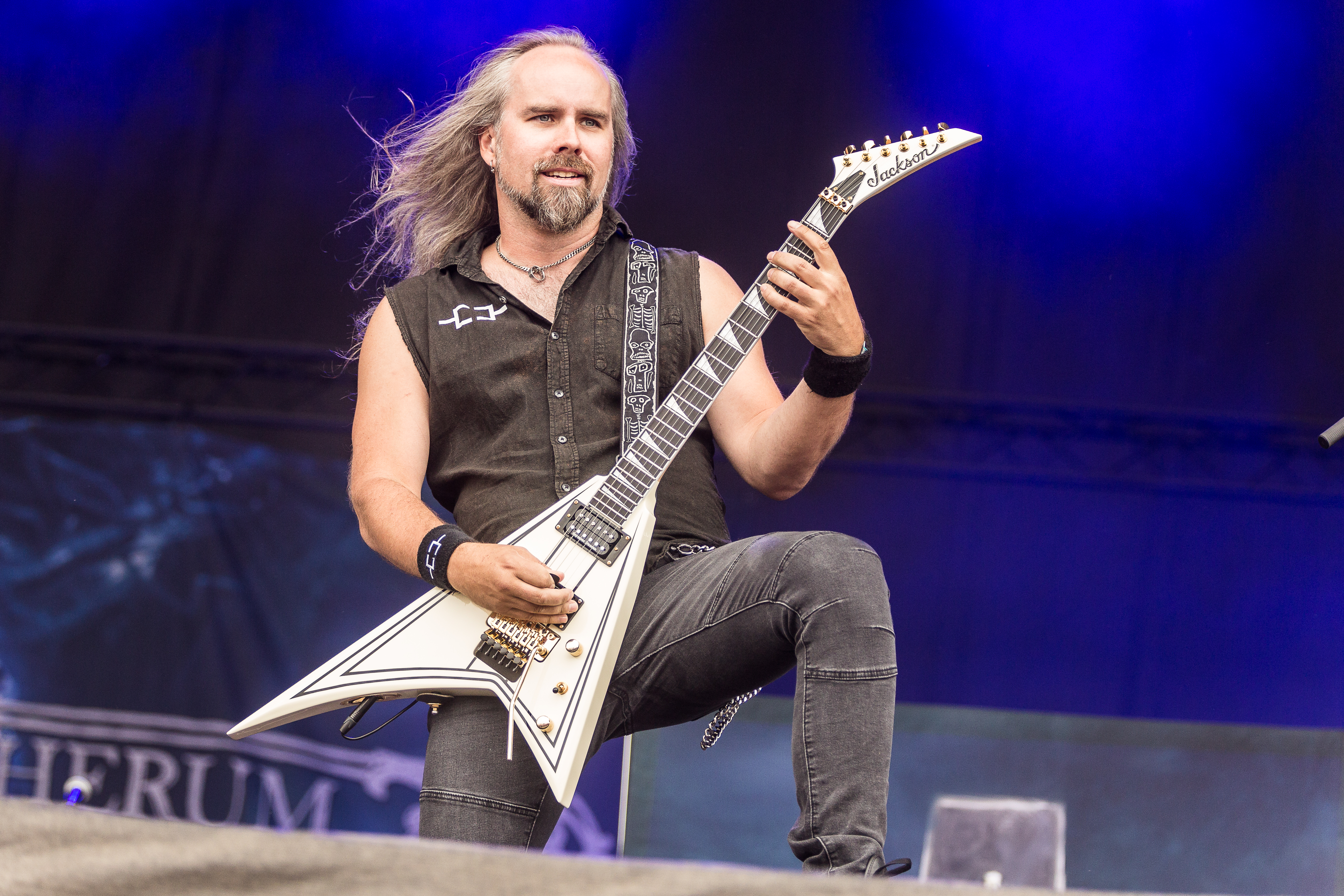
Lead guitarist Markus Vanhala at Rockharz 2019

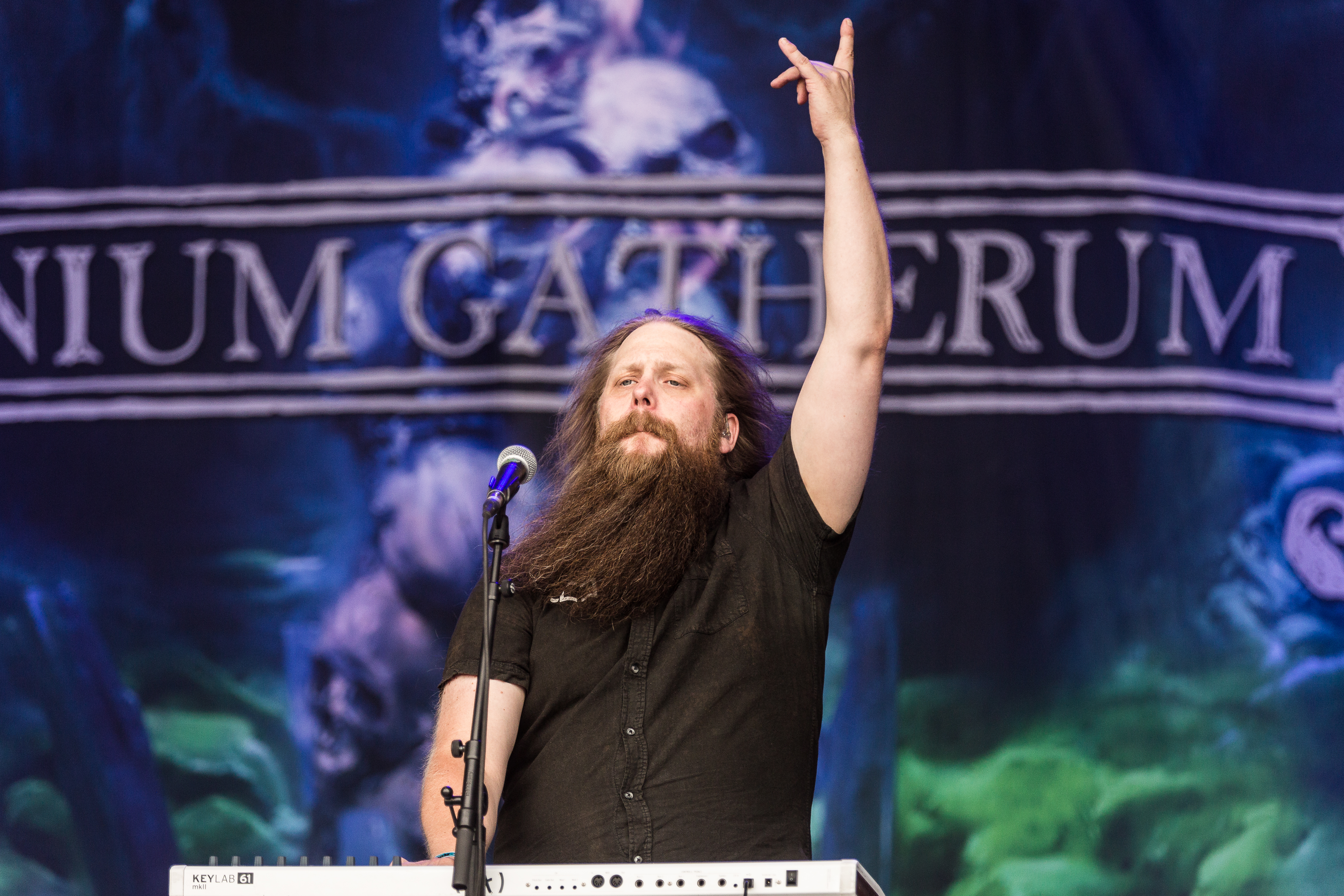
Keyboardist Aapo Koivisto at Rockharz 2019

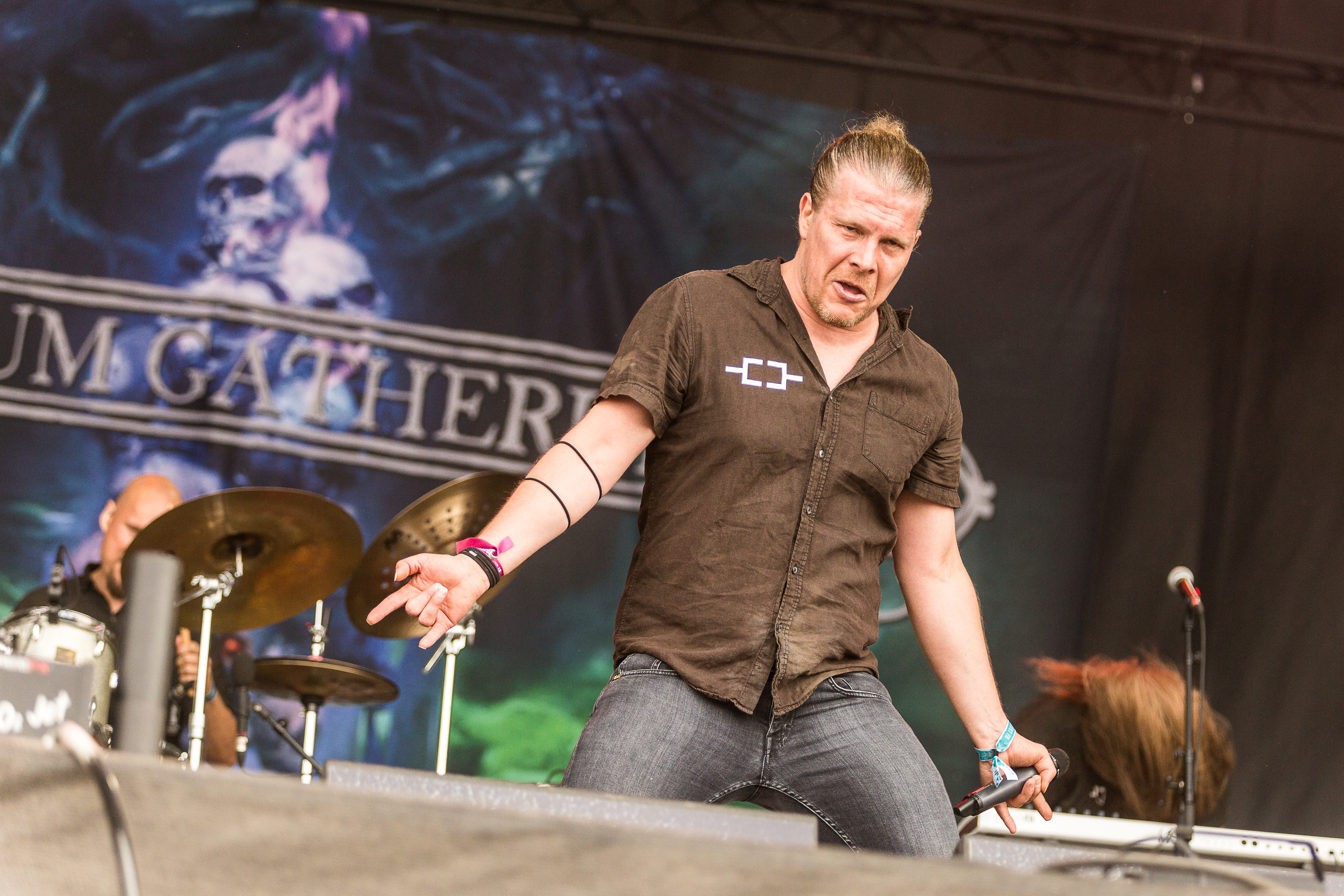
Vocalist Jukka Pelkonen at Rockharz 2019

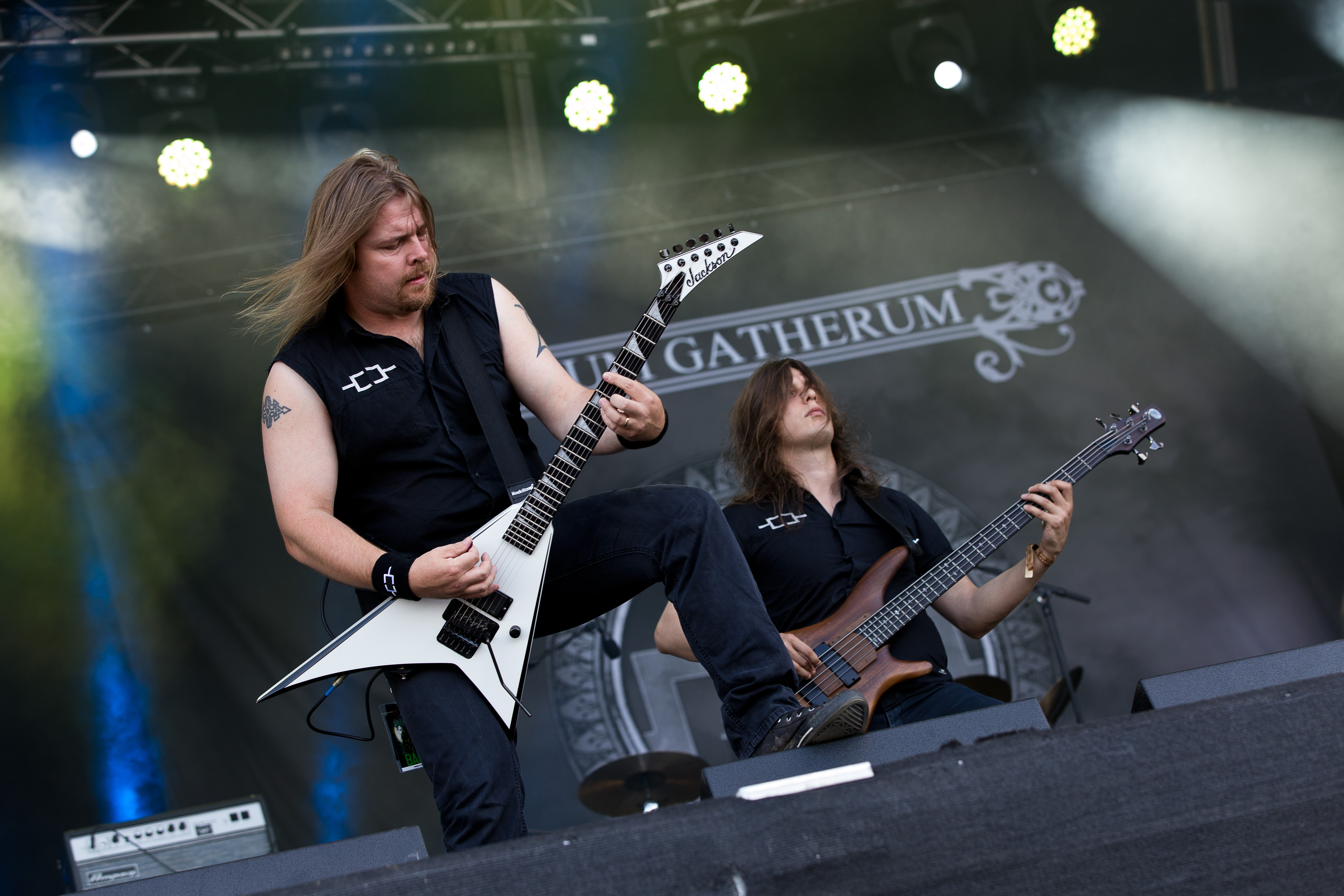
Rhythm guitarist Joonas Koto and bassist Erkki Silvennoinen at Rockharz 2016

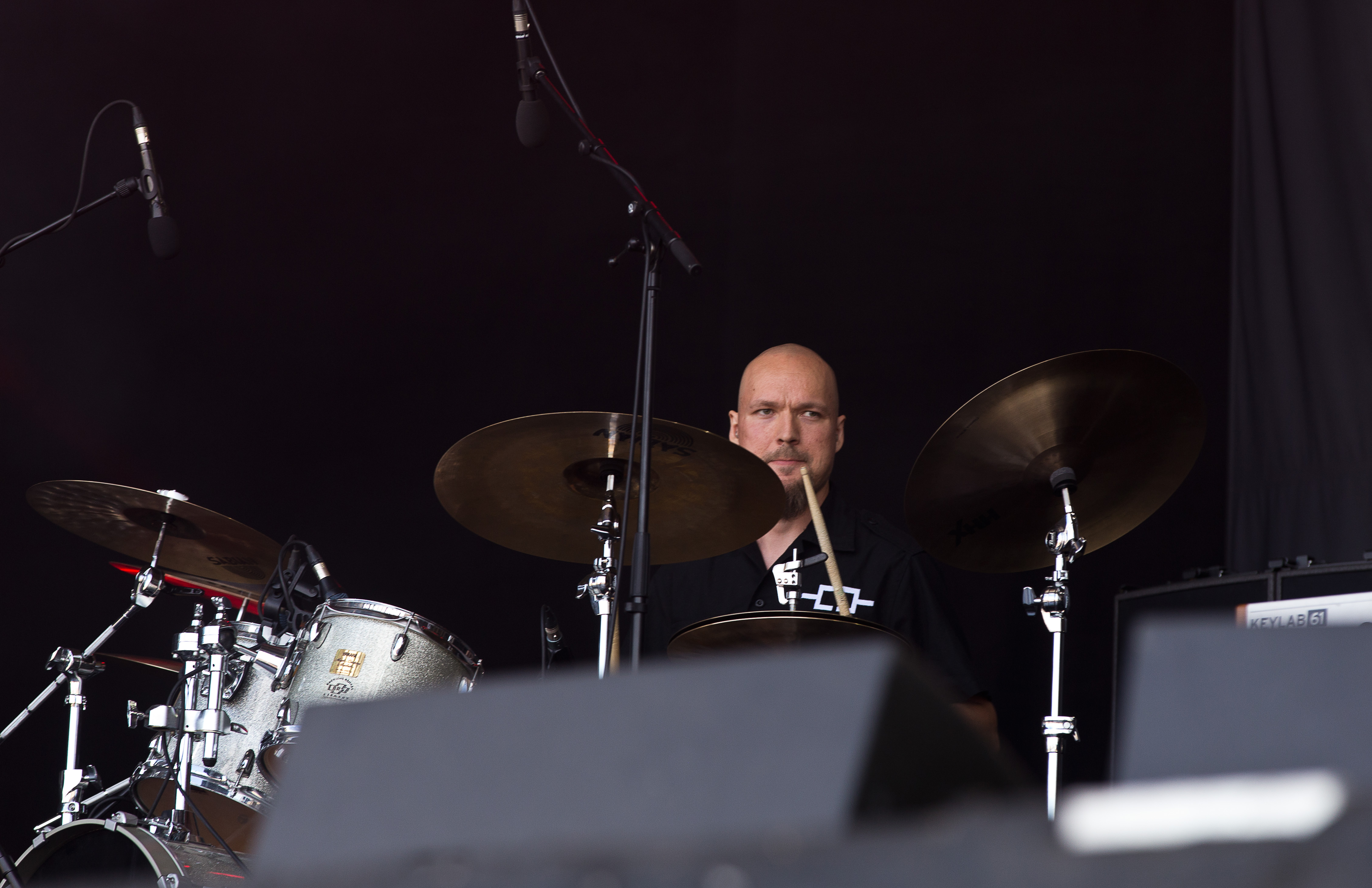
Drummer Tuomo Latvala at Rockharz 2016

== History ==
After four demos and an EP and signing with Rage of Achilles, Omnium Gatherum released their debut full-length album, Spirits and August Light, in April 2003, which attracted some attention in the underground metal community and the press.

The band signed to Nuclear Blast in the autumn of 2004 to release their second album, Years in Waste. This album was more technical and progressive than earlier releases.

In the spring of 2006, singer Antti Filppu was replaced with Jukka Pelkonen, aka "J", from the band Elenium. Stuck Here on Snakes Way was their first album with Pelkonen on vocals, released in April 2007 after a UK tour and signing to Candlelight Records. They followed the album with tours alongside Dark Tranquillity, Caliban and Entombed, as well as numerous Finnish headlining shows, and reaching the No. 31 position in the Finnish national album chart.

Omnium Gatherum's fourth album, The Redshift, was recorded at Sound Supreme and SouthEastSounds Studios during the spring of 2008, and was mixed and mastered at Unisound Studio in Sweden by Dan Swanö, who stated of the album, "I hate bands like Omnium Gatherum, they are so good it pisses me off!!! Their fine blend of melody and aggression is so good I thought about stealing the record and releasing it as my own. :) You won't find a better album in years." The Redshift received generally positive reviews, led to European tours with Nile/Grave in 2008 and Swallow the Sun/Insomnium in 2009, and charted on the Finnish official album chart at No. 24.

In the summer of 2008, bassist Eerik Purdon announced that he was leaving Omnium Gatherum, and in 2009 Toni Mäki officially joined the band as their new bassist.

In August 2010, Omnium Gatherum announced that they had signed with Lifeforce Records for their next release, and that rhythm guitarist Harri Pikka had left the band. Their official statement read, "We're really sorry to announce also that Harri Pikka has silently decided to flee the OG crew after 13 years of solid service. We don't know his exact reasons for this but maybe someday mr. Mystery Man tells us… :) At the moment we've decided to finish the new album as a 5-piece unit, but we have the best possible live guitar unit called Joonas Koto (Malpractice / Ex-To/Die/For / Ex-Hateframe) filling the second guitar live duties at the moment and it rocks!" Omnium Gatherum recorded their fifth studio album for an early 2011 release. Markus Vanhala played all guitar parts for the recording. Swanö mixed and mastered the album.

Their fifth album, New World Shadows, was released in Germany, Austria and Switzerland on 4 February 2011, in Finland, Sweden and Hungary on 9 February, the rest of Europe on 7 February, and North America on 1 March. It topped the Finnish album charts and was on the fifth position on the official national album chart, as well as placing first on the Finnish Rumba indie chart. The album was recorded during the period of August–October 2010. After its release, Omnium Gatherum toured Europe with Rotting Christ in April/May 2011.

On 17 June 2011, it was announced that Joonas "Jope" Koto had joined Omnium Gatherum as full-time second guitarist, replacing Harri Pikka.

On 10 July 2015, the band announced that they had almost finished recording a new album. The album, Grey Heavens, was released in 2016.

In 2021, Omnium Gatherum released their ninth studio album, Origin, and announced a North American tour supported by Allegaeon and Black Crown Initiate.

== Band members ==
=== Current ===
- Markus Vanhala – lead guitar & clean vocals (1996–present)
- Aapo Koivisto – keyboards (2005–present)
- Jukka Pelkonen – lead vocals (2006–present)
- Mikko Kivistö – bass (2020–present)
- Atte Pesonen – drums (2021–present)
- Joonas "Jope" Koto – rhythm guitar, clean vocals (2010–2020, 2025–present)

=== Former ===
- Olli Lappalainen – lead vocals (1996–2000), rhythm guitar (1996–1997)
- Ville Salonen – drums (1996–1999)
- Mikko Nykänen – keyboards (1996–1999)
- Olli Mikkonen – bass (1996–1997)
- Harri Pikka – rhythm guitar (1997–2010)
- Janne Markkanen – bass (1998–2007)
- Jarmo Pikka – drums (1999–2016)
- Tomi Pekkola – keyboards (1999–2001)
- Antti Filppu – lead vocals (2000–2006)
- Mikko Pennanen – keyboards (2001–2003)
- Jukka Perälä – keyboards (2003–2005)
- Eerik Purdon – bass (2007-2009, 2012)
- Toni "Tsygä" Mäki – bass (2009–2012)
- Erkki Silvennoinen – bass (2012–2019)
- Tuomo Latvala – drums (2016–2021)
- Nick Cordle – rhythm guitar (2022–2025)

=== Touring Session members ===
• Pyry Hanski – bass (2016 - 2020)

- Jani Liimatainen - rhythm guitar (2019-2021)
- Henry Hämäläinen - vocals (2026)

== Discography ==
Studio albums

- Spirits and August Light (2003)
- Years in Waste (2004)
- Stuck Here on Snakes Way (2007)
- The Redshift (2008)
- New World Shadows (2011)
- Beyond (2013)
- Grey Heavens (2016)
- The Burning Cold (2018)
- Origin (2021)
- May the Bridges We Burn Light the Way (2025)

Demos

- Forbidden Decay (1997)
- Omnium Gatherum (1998)
- Gardens, Temples... This Hell (1999)
- Wastrel (2001)

EPs

- Steal the Light (2002)
- Slasher (2023)
