= Molotov Solution =

American deathcore band

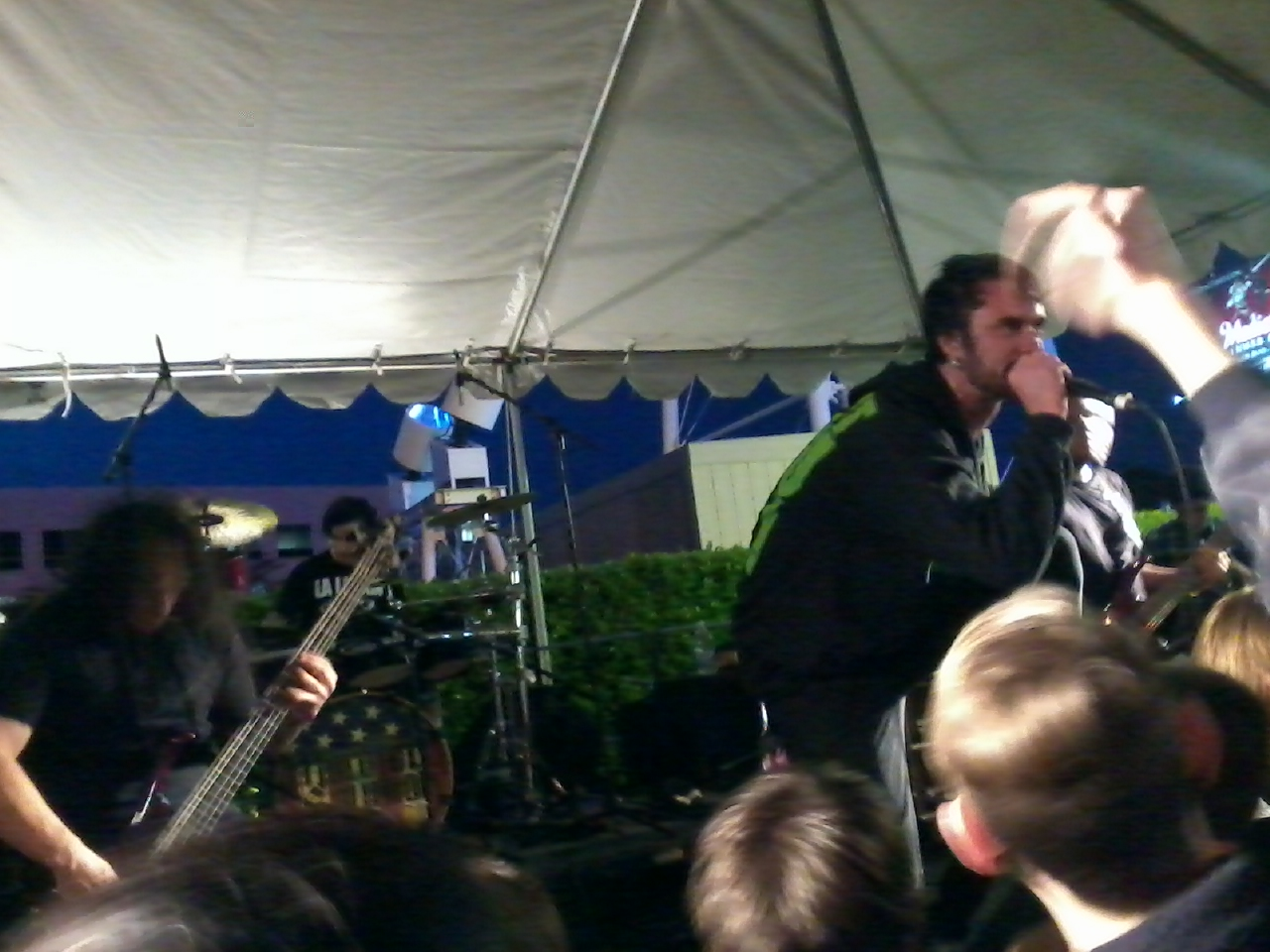
- Molotov Solution performing at California Metal fest in Anaheim, California in 2011

Background information
- Origin: Las Vegas, Nevada, U.S.
- Genre: Deathcore
- Years active: 2004–2012; 2013–present
- Labels: BlkHeart; Metal Blade; Twelve Gauge
- Members: Nick Arthur; Robbie Pina; Jacob Durrett
- Past members: Justin Fornof; Mike Degilormo; Cassidy Sprague; Matt Manchuso; Kyle Davis; Sims Housten-Collison; Jeremy Johnson; Kevin Oakley; Shane Slade; Richie Gomez
- Website: molotovsolution.com

Molotov Solution is an American deathcore band from Las Vegas, Nevada. They are notable for their politically-charged lyrics, which include themes of government conspiracies and world issues. The band announced their hiatus in June 2012, but reformed in 2013 and have been active since.

== History ==
Molotov Solution was founded in 2004. The group released a demo, followed by the EP The Path to Extinction, which was released in 2005 and again in 2006 the band provided one half of a split release album with War from a Harlots Mouth.

In 2008, the group released a self-titled full-length album with a "much more groove oriented approach". As guitarist Robbie Pina stated in Jason Bracelin's "Sounding Off" column,

"I was kind of tired of writing riff after riff after riff, not really repeating anything, I wanted to make very solid songs and make things distinguishable on the album."

—

The split album with War from a Harlots Mouth and the self-titled album were released on Twelve Gauge Records in 2006. Later in 2008, the line-up except for guitarist Robbie Pina and bassist Kevin Oakley left the band for unstated reasons. This resulted in a change in musical direction and a different vocal style by new vocalist Nick Arthur.

On December 10, 2008, Molotov Solution signed to Metal Blade and a full-length album, The Harbinger, recorded by Kelly Cairns, Daniel Castleman, and Tim Lambesis in his personal studio, was released on June 9, 2009.

By Spring 2010, Colisen, Oakley, and Johnson had left the band for personal reasons but on good terms. Molotov Solution toured through 2010. Arthur and Pina found a few fill-in members for a summer headlining tour and on the No Time to Bleed tour in October, headlined by Suicide Silence.

On December 8, 2010, it was announced that Molotov Solution signed with BlkHeart Group. The band announced a few lineup changes. The band released their third full-length album, Insurrection, on October 25.

On January 5, 2012, it was announced that founding member/guitarist Robbie Pina had left the band and Cody Jarvis would be his temporary replacement. Jarvis had filled in for Pina while he was on a "personal" break from the band on the Age of Hell Tour co-headlined by Chimaira and Unearth. On June 13, 2012, vocalist Nick Arthur revealed that the band would take an indefinite hiatus. The band reformed in July 2013.

In December 2015, it was announced that Nick Arthur would tour with Australian band Thy Art Is Murder following vocalist CJ McMahon's departure.

On November 25, 2021, the band announced that the album Insurrection had been remastered, including the track "The Infernal Machine", a song that was never released digitally.

On November 1, 2024, the band released the single "Devour The Children", their first new song in 13 years. The band released three more singles. "Mortis Imperium" was released on November 22, 2024. "The Golden Tower" was released on December 13, 2024. "Necessary Evil" was released on February 28, 2025. These four singles later appeared on the band's EP Void, produced by Fit for an Autopsy guitarist Will Putney and released on March 21, 2025.

== Members ==
Current members

- Robbie Pina – guitar (2004–2012, 2013–present)
- Nick Arthur – lead vocals (2008–2012, 2013–present)
- Jacob Durrett – drums (2010–2012, 2020–present)

Past members

- Justin Fornof – bass (2005–2006, currently in Wristmeetrazor)
- Mike Degilormo – bass (2006)
- Cassidy Sprague – guitar (2004–2007)
- Matt Manchuso – drums (2004–2008)
- Kyle Davis – lead vocals (2004–2008)
- Sims Housten-Collison – guitar (2008–2010, 2013–2015)
- Jeremy Johnson – drums (2008–2010, 2013–2015)
- Kevin Oakley – bass (2006–2010, 2013–2015)
- Shane Slade – bass (2010–2012, currently in Winds of Plague & Immortal Disfigurement)
- Richie Gomez – guitar (2010–2012)

Timeline

== Discography ==
Released	Title	Label
2004	Demo 2004	Self-released
2005	The Path to Extinction (EP)	Self-released
2006	Split – (Split album with War from a Harlots Mouth)	Twelve Gauge Records
2008	Molotov Solution	Twelve Gauge Records
2009	The Harbinger	Metal Blade Records
2011	Insurrection	BlkHeart
2025	Void (EP)	Self-released

== Videography ==
Year	Title	Director
2010	"Awakening"	Roger Sieber
2011	"The Blood of Tyrants"	Josh Knoff
2024	"Devour The Children"	Dylan Hryciuk
2024	"Mortis Imperium"	Dylan Hryciuk
2024	"The Golden Tower"	Dylan Hryciuk
