= Spirits and August Light =

Studio album by Omnium Gatherum
- Released: 23 February 2003
- Genre: Melodic death metal
- Length: 42:01
- Label: Rage of Achilles

Omnium Gatherum chronology
Steal the Light (EP) (2003)	Spirits and August Light (2003)	Years in Waste (2004)

Professional ratings
Review scores
Source	Rating
AllMusic	3/5 stars

Spirits and August Light is the debut studio album by Finnish melodic death metal band Omnium Gatherum, released in 2003.

== Track listing ==
No.	Title	Length
1.	"Writhen"	3:40
2.	"Deathwhite"	4:58
3.	"The Perfumed Garden"	4:55
4.	"Amor Tonight"	4:21
5.	"Cure a Wound"	4:07
6.	"The Emptiness of Spirit"	4:08
7.	"Wastrel"	4:41
8.	"Son's Thoughts"	5:20
9.	"It Shines"	5:51
Total length:		42:01

Japanese edition bonus tracks (Steal the Light EP)
No.	Title	Length
10.	"Wastrel"	4:39
11.	"Son's Thoughts"	5:45
12.	"Candles for Giordano Bruno"	3:20
13.	"Ammo"	6:14
14.	"Lost and Found"	5:41
Total length:		67:40

2008 reissue bonus tracks (Woodbine Garden Sessions)
No.	Title	Length
15.	"Suicide Machine" (Death cover)	4:32
16.	"Hangar 18" (Megadeth cover)	4:12
Total length:		76:24

== Credits ==
Omnium Gatherum

- Antti Filppu – vocals
- Markus Vanhala – guitar
- Harri Pikka – guitar
- Janne Markkanen – bass
- Mikko Pennanen – keyboards
- Jarmo Pikka – drums

Additional performers

- Jukka Pelkonen – vocals on "Deathwhite" and "Son's Thoughts"
- Kasperi Heikkinen – guitar solo on "The Perfumed Garden"

Production

- Nino Laurenne – recording, mixing
- Mika Jussila – mastering
- Olli Lappalainen – art direction, design, photography
