= Herod (band) =

American heavy metal band

- Origin: United States
- Genres: Heavy metal; thrash metal
- Years active: 2000–present
- Label: Lifeforce Records
- Members: Jesse Benker; Andy Huefner; Mike Jeffers
- Past members: Nate Seibel; Bryce March; Jason Russo; Jeremy Partlow; Judah Nero; Tom Broucksou

Herod is an American heavy metal band. The band was formed in 2000 in Buffalo, New York, United States, by Jesse Benker and Mike Jeffers, formerly of the band Dead to the World. Their first release was Sinner's in the Eyes of an Angry God in 2001, followed by Execution Protocol in early 2002, through Too Damn Hype Records. In 2003, the band was signed by Lifeforce Records. Since being signed, the band has released two albums with Lifeforce, the first being For Whom the Gods Would Destroy in 2004. Jason Russo replaced vocalist Judah Nero in 2005. Shortly afterward the band went into the studio to record their second album with Lifeforce Records, Rich Man's War, Poor Man's Fight, with producer Doug White. The record was released in March 2006. In late 2008, Herod joined Dark Harvest Records and began recording their label debut, Curse of the King, and follow up Self Titled EP. Herod toured Europe during the fall of 2015 supporting Carcass and Napalm Death, along with Obituary and Voivod.

== Band members ==
=== Current ===
- Jesse Benker – vocals and lead guitar
- Andy Huefner – bass
- Mike "Union" Jeffers – drums

=== Former ===
- Jason Russo – vocals
- Nate Seibel – vocals
- Bryce March – guitar
- Chuck Palisano – guitar
- Jeremy Partlow – bass
- Judah Nero – vocals
- Tom Broucksou – bass
- Greg DiPasquale – guitar
- Matt Backlass – bass

== Discography ==
- Sinners in the Eyes of an Angry God (2001)
- Execution Protocol (2002)
- For Whom the Gods Would Destroy (2004)
- Rich Man's War, Poor Man's Fight (2006)
- Curse of the King (2009)
- Self Titled (EP) (2013)
- Split 7" (2014)
