= Jason John Russo =

American heavy metal vocalist

Jason Russo
- Born: November 20, 1973 (age 51); Jacksonville, North Carolina
- Origin: United States
- Genres: Heavy metal
- Years active: 2004–present
- Labels: Lifeforce Records, Schnozz Records
- Website: http://jasonrusso.name/

Jason John Russo (born November 20, 1973) is an American heavy metal singer, songwriter and session recording vocalist, best known for having fronted Buffalo, New York heavy metal band Herod (signed by Lifeforce Records). Jason is classically and operatically trained with a powerful 3½ octave vocal range.

== Discography ==
- Metal Force Metal Rebirth - 2010
- Worwyk Malignant - 2009
- Darkling Metal Reborn - 2007
- Herod Rich Man's War, Poor Man's Fight - 2006
- Darkling Sinking - 2004

== Other interests ==
- In July 2010, Russo fronted Icarus Witch for the first 3 shows on their tour with Y&T.
- In March 2010, Russo did a video and musical remake of A-ha’s song "Take On Me".
- Russo had an acting role in Killer Wolf Films "Fist of the Vampire" (imdb.com)
