= Years in Waste =

Studio album by Omnium Gatherum
- Released: 9 November 2004
- Genre: Melodic death metal
- Length: 43:49
- Label: Nuclear Blast

Omnium Gatherum chronology
Spirits and August Light (2003)	Years in Waste (2004)	Stuck Here on Snakes Way (2007)

Professional ratings
Review scores
Source	Rating
AllMusic	2.5/5 stars

Years in Waste is the second studio album by Finnish melodic death metal band Omnium Gatherum. Released in 2004, it was their only release on Nuclear Blast and the last album to feature Antti Filppu on vocals and Jukka Perälä on synthesizer.

== Track listing ==
No.	Title	Length
1.	"The Fall Went Right Through Here"	4:21
2.	"Waste of Bereavement"	5:07
3.	"Misanthropic (Let the Crown Fall)"	3:41
4.	"Black Seas Cry"	6:01
5.	"It's a Long Night"	3:32
6.	"No Moon & No Queen"	4:25
7.	"Gravesilence"	3:46
8.	"The Nolan's Fati"	4:21
9.	"More Withering"	4:45
10.	"Auguries Gone"	3:46

2008 reissue bonus tracks (Woodbine Garden Sessions)
No.	Title	Length
11.	"Moneytalks"
12.	"Theme from Helsinki, Helsinki"
13.	"City Red Light (With High Spirits and Barclay)"
14.	"Remember the Frozen"
15.	"Das Wegrecht"
16.	"My Hands Were Tied"

== Credits ==
- Antti Filppu – vocals
- Markus Vanhala – guitar
- Harri Pikka – guitar
- Janne Markkanen – bass
- Jukka Perälä – synthesizer
- Jarmo Pikka – drums
