= The Burning Cold =

Studio album by Omnium Gatherum
- Released: 31 August 2018
- Recorded: 2018
- Genre: Melodic death metal
- Length: 51:17
- Label: Century Media
- Producer: Markus Vanhala, Teemu Aalto

Omnium Gatherum chronology
Grey Heavens (2016)	The Burning Cold (2018)	Origin (2021)

Singles from The Burning Cold
- 1. "Gods Go First" Released: 6 July 2018; 2. "Refining Fire" Released: 10 August 2018; 3. "Over the Battlefield" Released: 7 September 2018

Professional ratings
Review scores
Source	Rating
BraveWords	8/10
Metal Injection	8/10
Sonic Perspectives	8.8/10

The Burning Cold is the eighth studio album by Finnish melodic death metal band Omnium Gatherum. It was released on 31 August 2018 via Century Media Records. It is the band's first album Century Media, which released their previous albums in America, as their main label, as well as their last first without longtime drummer Jarmo Pikka, who initially left temporarily for a paternity leave, but eventually, Pikka's departure was made permanent and fill-in drummer Tuomo Latvala was promoted to being a full-time member, though just for this album.

Vocalist Jukka Pelkonen explained in an interview about the writing process for the album, "It was kind of like a similar thing that has happened before with the previous albums. I think it's always like that when you write a new album, then we go on tour, then we have this feeling to record something new and then we start to think about the new riffs and stuff. Like, it was one and-a-half years ago, we started to have these ideas about 'The Burning Cold' and from that, it just went naturally, basically, with these paths, maybe in one-half and two years we have these new songs to record that would define OG in a new way, so we did it." The band went on a European tour in November for the album, supported by Wolfheart and Nothgard.

== Track listing ==
No.	Title	Length
1.	"The Burning"	2:06
2.	"Gods Go First"	4:30
3.	"Refining Fire"	5:14
4.	"Rest in Your Heart"	4:52
5.	"Over the Battlefield"	4:21
6.	"The Fearless Entity"	4:43
7.	"Be the Sky"	4:49
8.	"Driven by Conflict"	3:57
9.	"The Frontline"	5:13
10.	"Planet Scale"	5:43
11.	"Cold"	5:49

== Personnel ==
- Jukka Pelkonen – lead vocals
- Markus Vanhala – lead guitar
- Joonas "Jope" Koto – rhythm guitar, clean vocals
- Erkki Silvennoinen – bass
- Aapo Koivisto – keyboards
- Tuomo Latvala – drums

Production

- Produced by Markus Vanhala and Teemu Aalto
- Mixed and mastered by Dan Swanö
- Artwork by Olli Lappalainen
