= This or the Apocalypse =

American metalcore band

HAWK
- Origin: Lancaster, Pennsylvania, U.S.
- Genres: Metalcore
- Years active: 2005–present
- Labels: Lifeforce; eOne; Good Fight Entertainment
- Members: Ricky Armellino; Adam Reed; Mike Monto; Cody Nierstedt; Drew Hansen
- Past members: Jack Esbenshade; Bernard Stabley; Grant McFarland; Sean Hennessey; Robert Rivera Jr. Toby Pool; Aaron Ovecka; Matthew Marcellus; Zack Jones; Cody Cavanaugh; Rodney Phillips; Aaron Maloney; Brent Caltagirone; Jacob Belcher; Kevin Bakey

HAWK (formerly This or The Apocalypse) is an American metalcore band from Lancaster, Pennsylvania that formed in 2005.

== History ==
=== Monuments (2005–2009) ===
In 2008 the band signed to European metal label Lifeforce Records, and released the album Monuments later that year. The band went on several tours throughout 2008 and 2009 with acts such as Kingston Falls, For Today, August Burns Red, A Skylit Drive, Sky Eats Airplane, and Greeley Estates across North America and Canada to promote Monuments.

=== Haunt What's Left (2009–2011) ===
The band was featured on season 1 episode 4 of the MTV show Silent Library, which aired January 2010 with members Rick, Rodney, Jack, Sean and Grant. On June 22, 2010, This or the Apocalypse announced their second studio album Haunt Whats's Left which was released on Good Fight/Road Runner Records. The album was recorded by Josh Wilbur and produced by Chris Adler of Lamb of God at Spin Studios in New York. Following the release of the album bassist Sean and drummer Grant both left the band for other projects. Sean left to focus on his band Bells with former August Burns Red vocalist Jon Hershey. Grant embarked on a career in music production and mastering, and joined the band Century which also features This or the Apocalypse vocalist Ricky on bass. This or the Apocalypse toured throughout 2010 to support Haunt What's Left with bands such as Impending Doom, and MyChildren MyBride, and headlined a tour with Affiance, Last Chance to Reason and Deception of a Ghost.

=== Dead Years (2011–2018) ===
In June 2012, the band signed with eOne and released Dead Years on September 25, 2012. In 2013, the band released a new single titled "Damaged Good".

=== Name change to HAWK and upcoming album (2018-present) ===
In 2018 the band was renamed to HAWK and on March 22, 2019, released a new song titled "Mileage". Since then they have also self-released 2 more videos, "Counter-Ops" and "Alibi".

On December 4, 2020, HAWK released their first LP titled "Tolerance's Paradox" which included the previous 3 singles and 3 yet unreleased tracks.

On September 30, 2024, HAWK announced their comeback and welcomed Drew Hansen, Mike Monto and Cody Nierstedt into the band, stating that Jack Esbenshade and Bernard Stabley would be pursuing their own life and endeavors moving forward. Their first new single "Justify" was released on October 10, 2024. Another new single called "Break Bread" was released in cooperation with Neural DSP on November 24, 2024.

On December 9, 2024, the band announced a tour supporting the German band Ghostkid on their East Coast tour in early 2025. Another tour for September and October 2025, supporting the German band Future Palace has recently been announced.

== Musical style ==
This or the Apocalypse fall into the metalcore genre. Their music is characterized primarily by a heavy emphasis on melody and technical ability. The band's music features frequent use of technical or odd time signatures, complex polyrhythms, and some songs have been described as having a prog-rock structure.

== Members ==
Current

- Ricky Armellino − lead vocals (2005–present)
- Adam Reed − drums (2018−present)
- Mike Monto − rhythm guitar (2024−present)
- Cody Nierstedt − lead guitar (2024−present)
- Drew Hansen − bass (2024−present)

Former

- Robert Rivera Jr. – bass (2005–2006)
- Toby Pool – drums (2005–2006)
- Jacob Belcher – rhythm guitar (2005–2007)
- Kevin Bakey – bass (2006–2007)
- Sean Hennessey − bass (2007–2010)
- Grant McFarland − drums (2006–2010)
- Brent Caltagirone – drums (2010–2011)
- Matthew Marcellus − bass, backing vocals (2010–2013)
- Aaron Ovecka − drums (2011–2013)
- Aaron Maloney − drums (2013–2014)
- Rodney Phillips − rhythm guitar, backing vocals (2007–2014)
- Jack Esbenshade − lead guitar (2005–2024)
- Bernie Stabley – bass, backing vocals (2018−2024)

Timeline

== Discography ==
as This or the Apocalypse:

Studio albums

- Sentinels (Red Sea Records, 2006)
- Monuments (Lifeforce Records, 2008)
- Haunt What's Left (Good Fight Entertainment, 2010)
- Dead Years (eOne, 2012)

Extended plays

- Drunken Billionaire Burns Down Home (Self-released, 2006)

as HAWK:

Extended plays

- Tolerance's Paradox (Self-released, 2020)
