= May the Bridges We Burn Light the Way =

Studio album by Omnium Gatherum
- Released: 7 November 2025
- Recorded: 2024–2025
- Genre: Melodic death metal
- Length: 40:16
- Label: Century Media
- Producer: Markus Vanhala, Björn Strid, Jens Bogren

Omnium Gatherum chronology
Origin (2021)	May the Bridges We Burn Light the Way (2025)

Singles from May the Bridges We Burn Light the Way
- 1. "The Last Hero" Released: 17 June 2025; 2. "My Pain" Released: 8 August 2025; 3. "Walking Ghost Phase" Released: 24 September 2025; 4. "The Darkest City" Released: 7 November 2025

Professional ratings
Review scores
Source	Rating
Angry Metal Guy	3/5
Blabbermouth.net	8.5/10
Metal Temple	10/10

May the Bridges We Burn Light the Way is the tenth studio album by Finnish melodic death metal band Omnium Gatherum. It was released on 7 November 2025 via Century Media Records. Singles and music videos were released for the songs "The Last Hero", "My Pain", "Walking Ghost Phase", and "The Darkest City". The album has received mostly positive feedback from critics. The band embarked on a North American tour from November to December 2025, with support from Æther Realm and Hinayana.

== Track listing ==
May the Bridges We Burn Light the Way track listing
No.	Title	Length
1.	"May the Bridges We Burn Light the Way"	1:35
2.	"My Pain"	4:53
3.	"The Last Hero"	4:00
4.	"The Darkest City"	6:55
5.	"Walking Ghost Phase"	3:53
6.	"Ignite the Flame"	5:19
7.	"Streets of Rage"	3:57
8.	"Barricades"	5:43
9.	"Road Closed Ahead"	4:01
Total length:		40:16

== Personnel ==
Omnium Gatherum

- Jukka Pelkonen – vocals
- Markus Vanhala – guitars
- Aapo Koivisto – keyboards
- Mikko Kivistö – bass
- Atte Pesonen – drums

Production

- Produced by Markus Vanhala, Björn "Speed" Strid, and Jens Bogren
- Mixed by Jens Bogren
- Mastered by Tony Lindgren
