= The Arsonist (Deadlock album) =

Studio album by Deadlock
- Released: 26 July 2013
- Genres: Melodic death metal, metalcore, djent
- Length: 53:58
- Label: Napalm

Deadlock chronology
Bizarro World (2011)	The Arsonist (2013)	The Re-Arrival (2014)

Professional ratings
Review scores
Source	Rating
Dead Rhetoric	7.5/10
Eternal Terror	2/6
Metal.de	6/10
Sputnikmusic	3.5/5

The Arsonist is the sixth full-length studio album by Deadlock. It was released on 26 July 2013, and is the first to have John Gahlert (previously the band's bass guitarist) on harsh vocals, following the departure of Johannes Prem and the first to feature Ferdinand Rewicki on guitar, replacing Gert Rymen who left on February 8, 2013. It is also the last album to feature Tobias Graf on drums. Graf left the band on April 28, 2014, and died that same year on September 4 at the age of 35. Samples of all the songs of the album were unveiled on 4 July 2013, three weeks before the album's release. A music video was released for the song "I'm Gone".

== Track listing ==
No.	Title	Length
1.	"The Great Pretender"	03:58
2.	"I'm Gone"	03:28
3.	"Dead City Sleepers"	03:55
4.	"The Arsonist"	03:31
5.	"Darkness Divine"	03:51
6.	"As We Come Undone"	03:54
7.	"Hurt"	05:34
8.	"The Final Storm"	03:55
9.	"Smalltown Boy" (Bronski Beat cover)	04:10
10.	"My Pain"	03:34
11.	"Dead City Sleepers" (Erode-Remix)	06:20
12.	"As We Come Undone" (Philip Abbas Remix)	07:48
Total length:		53:58

Japanese Edition Bonus Track
No.	Title	Length
13.	"Dead City Sleepers" (Acoustic Version)	02:37
Total length:		56:35

== Personnel ==
- Sabine Scherer – clean vocals
- John Gahlert – harsh vocals
- Sebastian Reichl – guitar, keyboard, programming
- Ferdinand Rewicki – guitar, bass guitar
- Tobias Graf – drums

== Chart performance ==
Chart (2013)	Peak position
GER	82
