= War from a Harlots Mouth =

German metalcore band

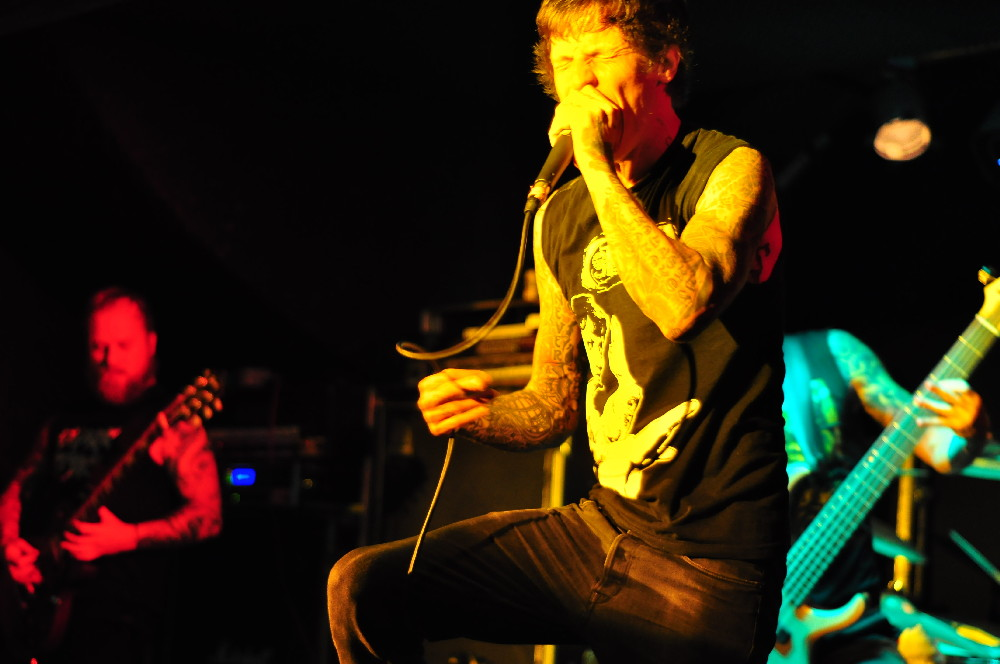
- Performing in September of 2009

Background information
- Also known as: WFAHM
- Origin: Berlin, Germany
- Genres: Metalcore; mathcore; deathcore (early)
- Years active: 2005–2013
- Labels: Lifeforce; Season of Mist
- Members: Nico Webers; Simon Hawemann; Daniel Oberländer; Filip Hantusch; Paul Seidel
- Past members: Steffen Winopal
- Website: wfahm.com

War from a Harlots Mouth was a German metalcore band from Berlin, formed in 2005. Consisting of vocalist Nico Webers, guitarists Simon Hawemann and Daniel Oberländer, bassist Filip Hantusch, and drummer Paul Seidel, the band is noted for a distinct musical style consisting of infusing many different genres into their songs, such as math metal, death metal, and jazz.

The band's first release, an EP titled Falling Upstairs, was released in 2005 exclusively on cassette. Following this, WFAHM released four full-lengths; Transmetropolitan (2007), In Shoals (2009) and MMX (2010). The group's final album Voyeur (2012) was launched just one year before the band's "indefinite hiatus". Their final show took place on 30 December 2013, in Berlin.

== History ==
War from a Harlots Mouth was founded during 2005. The band was formed only as a side-project originally and consisted of three members only, including their vocalist, drummer and one guitarist. The name of the group was inspired by/represents a "lying person"; " the war from the mouth is the lie itself, while the harlot stands for the liar." The band deliberately didn't include an apostrophe within the word "harlots" because they "didn't like the look".

War from a Harlots Mouth recorded and produced their first EP titled Falling Upstairs in cassette format during June 2006 with only 50 physical copies of it released through the independent Berlin-based cassette tape label Yehonala Tapes. The lineup of the EP consisted of Simon Hawemann on guitar and bass, Paule Seidel on drums and Steffen Winopal on vocals. Later on that same year, they released a CD/10" Split with deathcore act Molotov Solution on Twelve Gauge Records. After finding a second guitarist and a bassist in the end of 2006, WFAHM joined the War of Attrition Tour in 2007, promoting the album of the same name by Dying Fetus, accompanying bands Skinless and Cattle Decapitation, also joining the stage for Never Say Die! Fest with bands Ion Dissonance, Dead to Fall, and Through the Eyes of the Dead. Also in 2007, the band joined Lifeforce Records and released their album Transmetropolitan in September.

In September, the band joined the European tour of bands The Ocean and Intronaut. Vocalist Winopal left the band shortly after these tours, having Nico Webers, formerly of The Ocean replacing him.

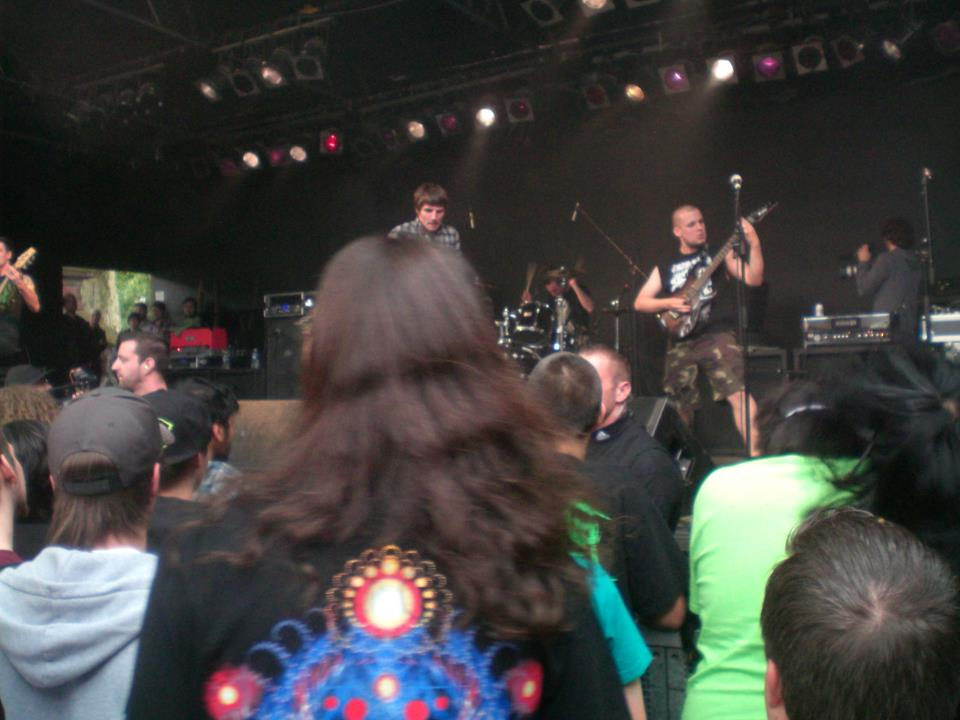
Performing at 2010's Summerblast

With Webers as a new vocalist, they went on their first headlining tour promoting Transmetropolitan with fellow labelmates Burning Skies. In 2008, they joined the Grinding into Catacylism Tour, with bands Psyopus, Left to Vanish, and Fuck the Facts, and later on released a 5" Split-CD on Sharkmen Records with the band Dead Flesh Fashion.

On January 28, 2009, the band announced release dates for In Shoals prior to its release, during WFAHM's inclusion in the Thrash and Burn European Tour 2009. In Shoals is where the band started to show a change in musical direction and is also the first album with the band's vocalist Nico Webers. The album showed a departure from their deathcore sound and more into mathcore and metalcore territory reminiscent of bands such as Converge and Gaza. After this album, the band remained in this style for the rest of their career.

The group released their third full-length album, MMX on October 29, 2010. Given a high amount of acclaim the record was made available for streaming online prior to its physical and iTunes release.

On September 17, 2012, the band released a "lyrical video" for the first single- "Scopophobia", from their newest album Voyeur, which was released October 19 in Europe, and November 6 in the U.S.

=== Final show and controversy with Attila ===
The band announced that they would be going on a "indefinite hiatus" on August 16, 2013, followed by releasing an announcement of a farewell tour. The tour ended in their home city (Berlin) where their final show was played on December 30, 2013, and was filmed in its entirety.

During November 2016, War from a Harlots Mouth made a post accusing the American band Attila of plagiarism for stealing an idea from one of their songs. In the open letter, WFAHM referred to Attila as "undoubtedly most mentally challenged band on planet earth" and claimed that their song "Obsession" stole the idea of sampling the sounds of a machine gun during a breakdown from their song "If You Want to Blame Us for Something Wrong, Please Abuse This Song", which was released 9 years earlier.

== Band members ==
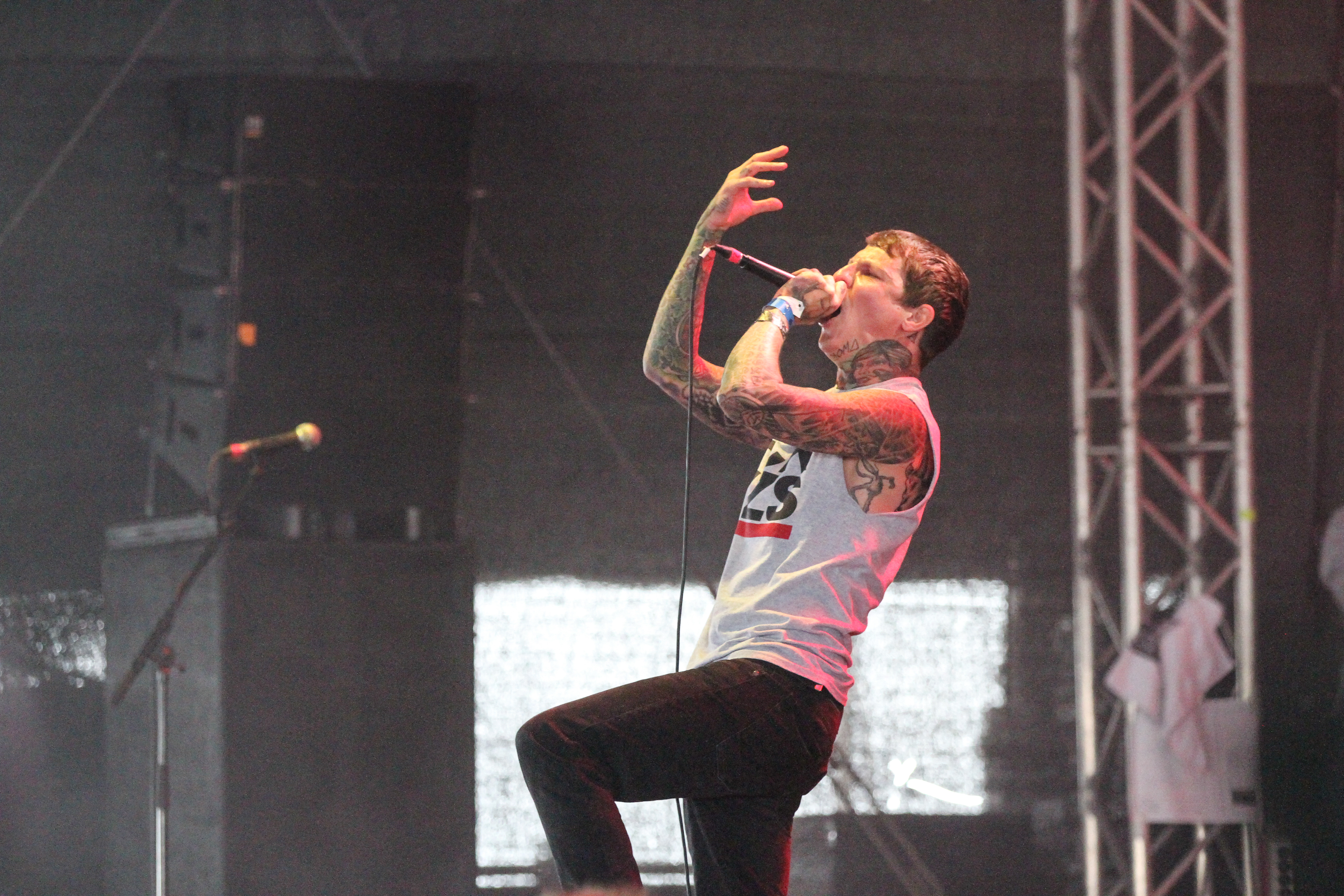
Vocalist Nico Webbers in 2013

Final lineup

- Paul Seidel – drums (2005–2013)
- Simon Hawemann – guitar (2005-2006, 2008–2013), bass (2005-2006)
- Daniel Oberländer – guitar (2006–2013)
- Filip Hantusch – bass (2006–2013)
- Nico Webers – vocals (2007–2013)

Previous members

- Steffen Winopal (ex-With Abandon, Vijeriah) – vocals (2005–2007)

Timeline

== Discography ==
Studio albums

- Transmetropolitan (2007, Lifeforce)
- In Shoals (2009, Lifeforce)
- MMX (2010, Lifeforce)
- Voyeur (2012, Season of Mist)

EPs

- Falling Upstairs (2006, Yehonala)

Splits

- Molotov Solution / War from a Harlots Mouth CD/10" (2006, Twelve Gauge Records)
- Season 1: The Anti-Doctrine/Closed Casket Funeral/Starring Janet Leigh/War from a Harlots Mouth 10" (2007, 4 Seasons)
- Dead Flesh Fashion / War from a Harlots Mouth (2008, Sharkmen)
- Pentagon. 3 The Acacia Strain / WFAHM (2009)
- War from a Harlots Mouth / Burning Skies (2010, Lifeforce)
