= New World Shadows =

Studio album by Omnium Gatherum
- Released: 4 February 2011
- Recorded: August–October 2010
- Genre: Melodic death metal
- Length: 51:56
- Label: Lifeforce
- Producer: Dan Swanö

Omnium Gatherum chronology
The Redshift (2008)	New World Shadows (2011)	Beyond (2013)

Professional ratings
Review scores
Source	Rating
Alistair Martin Music	10/10 stars
Metal Review	(8.7/10)
The Newreview	5/5 stars

New World Shadows is the fifth studio album by Finnish melodic death metal band Omnium Gatherum. It was released in Germany, Austria and Switzerland on 4 February 2011, Finland, Sweden and Hungary on 9 February, the rest of Europe on 7 February, and North America on 1 March.

It is the band's first to be released via Lifeforce Records.

== Track listing ==
All songs written by Jukka Pelkonen and Markus Vanhala.

No.	Title	Length
1.	"Everfields"	9:17
2.	"Ego"	4:07
3.	"New World Shadows"	6:00
4.	"Soul Journeys"	4:54
5.	"Nova Flame"	4:10
6.	"An Infinite Mind"	5:43
7.	"Watcher of the Skies"	4:17
8.	"The Distance"	3:59
9.	"Deep Cold"	9:29

== Personnel ==
- Jukka Pelkonen – lead vocals
- Markus Vanhala – guitars, additional keyboards, backing vocals on track 2
- Toni Mäki – bass
- Aapo Koivisto – keyboards, backing vocals on track 2
- Jarmo Pikka – drums
