= Cipher System =

Swedish melodic death metal band

- Also known as: Eternal Grief (1995–2001)
- Origin: Tjörn, Sweden
- Genres: Melodic death metal
- Years active: 1995–present
- Labels: Lifeforce, Nuclear Blast
- Members: Johan Eskilsson; Henric Liljesand; Christian Älvestam
- Past members: Andreas Johansson; Magnus Öhlander; Daniel Schöldström; Jimmie Strimell; Andreas Solveström; Pontus Andersson; Pontus Hjelm

Cipher System is a Swedish melodic death metal band from Tjörn. The band formed under the name Eternal Grief in 1995. They changed their name in 2001 to Cipher System.

The band released their first album, Central Tunnel Eight, through Lifeforce Records on 2 November 2004. After some years of silence, the band spent several months between 2010 and 2011 to record a new album. The album was mixed at Studio Fredman and was entitled Communicate the Storms. Shortly after the album was finished, it was announced that the band signed with Nuclear Blast, and the album was released by the label on 9 September 2011.

On 31 July 2026, the band released a new EP, Torn Between Realities.

== Members ==
=== Current members ===
- Johan Eskilsson – guitars, clean vocals (1995–present)
- Henric Liljesand – bass (1995–present)
- Christian Älvestam – lead vocals (2020–present)

=== Session members ===
- Janne Jaloma – drums (2020–present)

=== Former members ===
- Pontus Andersson – drums (1995–2008)
- Andreas Johansson – guitars (1995–1999)
- Daniel Schöldström – lead vocals (1997–1999, 2001–2005)
- Peter Engström – keyboards (2001–2020)
- Magnus Öhlander – guitars (2002–2007)
- Jimmie Strimell – lead vocals (2005–2008)
- Andreas Allenmark – guitars (2008–2020)
- Andreas Solveström – lead vocals (2008–2009)
- Pontus Hjelm – guitars, clean vocals (2008–2009)
- Emil Frisk – drums (2009–2020)
- Karl Obbel – lead vocals (2010–2020)

== Discography ==
=== Studio albums ===
- Central Tunnel Eight (2004)
- Communicate the Storms (2011)

=== EPs ===
- Torn Between Realities (2026)

=== Demos ===
as Eternal Grief

- Path of Delight (1998)
- Raped by Chaos (1999)
- Awakening of Shadows (2000)

as Cipher System

- Eyecon (2002)
- Promo 2003 (2003)
- Promo 2006 (2006)
- Promo 2009 (2009)

=== Split albums ===
- Cipher System / By Night (2004)
