= Harbinger (company) =

Automobile parts manufacturer

Harbinger Motors Inc.
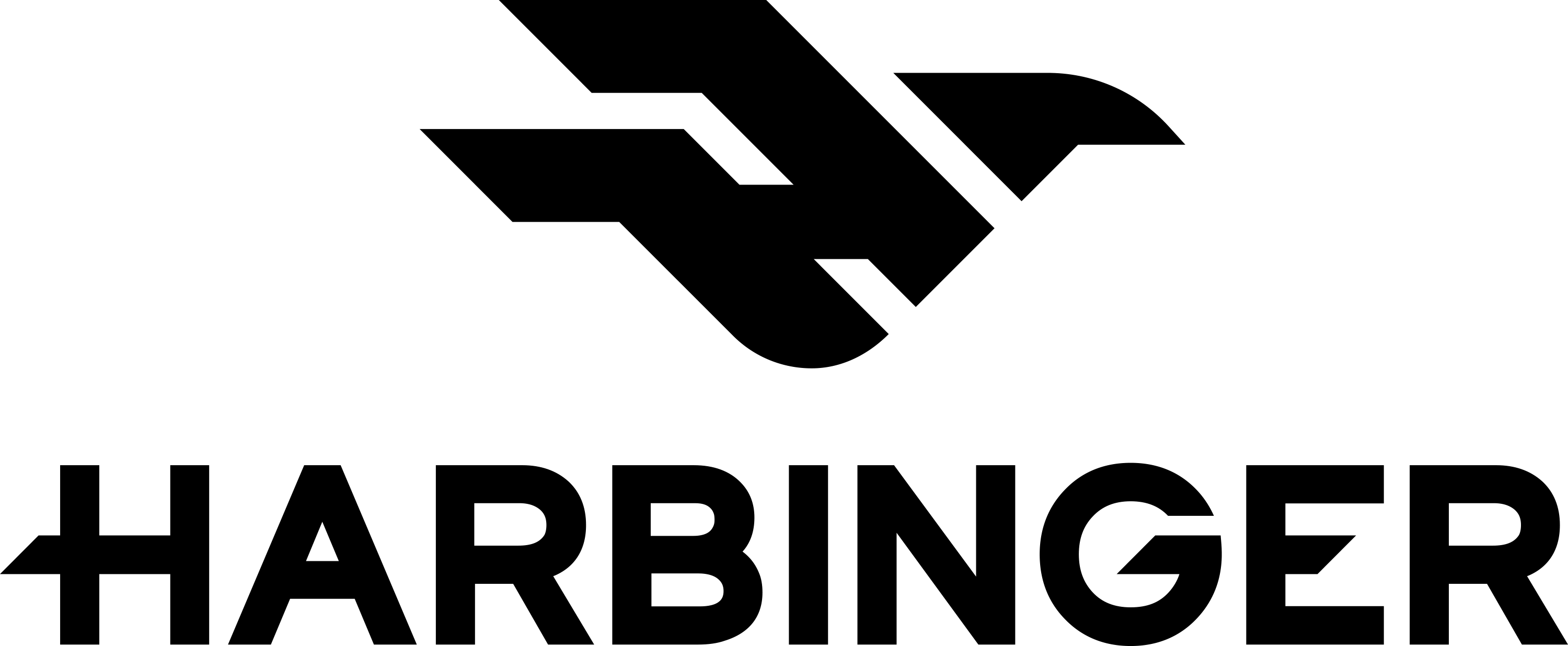
- Harbinger Motors
- Type: Private
- Founders: John Harris, Phillip Weicker, and Will Eberts
- Headquarters: Garden Grove, CA
- Key people: John Harris, CEO, Phillip Weicker, CTO
- Products: Medium-duty electric and hybrid vehicles
- Website: harbingermotors.com

Harbinger is a private company headquartered in Garden Grove, California. It produces chassis for medium-duty electric and hybrid vehicles. The company was founded in July 2021.

== History ==
Harbinger was founded by John Harris, Phillip Weicker, and Will Eberts in July 2021. It spent a year in research and development, before publicly announcing the business prior to the Detroit Auto Show in 2022 with an early alpha product. Then, it started a beta phase. The company raised $100 million in angel and series A funding, followed by another $100 million in series B funding announced in January 2025. In October 2024, Harbinger demonstrated a prototype hybrid RV co-developed with Thor Industries. By early 2025, it had built 100 chassis for commercial and recreational vehicles.

At ACT Expo 2024, Harbinger showcased its medium-duty electric vehicle platform for Class 4-7 trucks, including a chassis for last mile delivery fleets. The vertically integrated electric powertrain and modular 35 kWh battery was engineered for a 20-year service life and approximately 450,000 miles of operation.

== Operations ==
Harbinger designs, manufactures, and markets chassis for medium-duty trucks using a hybrid or electric motor. Harbinger designs and manufactures the chassis, which contain the engine, drivetrain, steering, brakes, and base structure of the vehicle. Then, body manufacturer of the vehicle that carries passengers and cargo. The motor, gearbox, and inverter are combined into a single unit. Harbinger operates a manufacturing facility in Garden Grove, California.
