= The Harbinger (album) =

Studio album by Molotov Solution
- Released: June 8, 2009
- Genre: Deathcore
- Length: 41:38
- Label: Metal Blade Records

Molotov Solution chronology
| Molotov Solution (2008) | The Harbinger (2009) | Insurrection (2011) |

Professional ratings
Review scores
| Source | Rating |
|---|---|
| AllMusic | 3.5/5 stars |
| Rock Sound | 3/10 stars |

The Harbinger is the second album by American deathcore band Molotov Solution.

In January 2009, Molotov Solution signed a deal with Metal Blade and began crafting their debut album for the label. Tim Lambesis of As I Lay Dying and Daniel Castleman were brought on board to mix, and tracking was handled by Kelly Cairns at Lambesis Studios in San Diego, CA (Sworn Enemy, Impending Doom, War of Ages).

The band can be noted for having lyrics about politics, government conspiracies, and world issues, which is uncommon for the genre.

A harbinger is a sign of things to come. Throughout history and literature, harbingers and omens figure prominently, and are responsible for major decisions which have altered the course of both.

== Track listing ==
| No. | Title | Length |
|---|---|---|
| 1. | "Warlords" | 3:26 |
| 2. | "Rule by Secrecy" | 3:54 |
| 3. | "Only the Dead" | 3:09 |
| 4. | "Atrum Inritus" | 2:20 |
| 5. | "Corpus Imperium" | 4:20 |
| 6. | "Monolithic Apparatus" | 3:16 |
| 7. | "The Harbinger" | 3:20 |
| 8. | "Enslaved" | 4:08 |
| 9. | "Awakening" | 3:42 |
| 10. | "Living Proof" | 3:16 |
| 11. | "The Dawn of Ascendency" | 6:52 |
| Total length: | | 41:38 |

== Band members ==
- Robbie Pina – guitar
- Sims Collison – guitar
- Jeremy Johnson – drums
- Nick Arthur – vocals
- Kevin Oakley – bass
