= The Redshift =

Studio album by Omnium Gatherum
- Released: 22 September 2008
- Genre: Melodic death metal
- Length: 47:52
- Label: Candlelight
- Producer: Dan Swanö

Omnium Gatherum chronology
Stuck Here on Snakes Way (2007)	The Redshift (2008)	New World Shadows (2011)

Professional ratings
Review scores
Source	Rating
AllMusic	3.5/5 stars

The Redshift is the fourth studio album by Finnish melodic death metal band Omnium Gatherum. It is the band's second release for the Candlelight Records label. The album features a number of creative aspects not yet attempted by the band.

A music video for the single "Nail" was released in Autumn 2008.

The album placed 24th in the Finnish heavy metal charts during 2008.

== Track listing ==
All lyrics written by Jukka Pelkonen.

No.	Title	Length
1.	"Nail"	3:44
2.	"A Shadowkey"	4:29
3.	"Chameleon Skin"	4:56
4.	"No Breaking Point"	3:47
5.	"The Return"	5:28
6.	"Shapes on Shades"	4:51
7.	"The Red Shifter"	3:41
8.	"Greeneyes"	4:39
9.	"The Second Flame"	4:24
10.	"Song for December"	2:19
11.	"Distant Light Highway"	5:34
