= Lifeforce Records =

German heavy metal record label

- Founded: 1995
- Genre: Metalcore, death metal, metal
- Country of origin: Germany
- Official website: lifeforcerecords.com

Lifeforce Records is a German heavy metal independent record label that specializes in metalcore and death metal. Their roster contains bands such as Confession, This or the Apocalypse, Omnium Gatherum and Last Leaf Down, and they have helped to launch the careers of bands who went on to larger labels, such as Heaven Shall Burn, Between the Buried and Me, Caliban and Trivium.

While Lifeforce has signed and continues to sign both European and American artists, they announced in October 2002 that they were going to shift focus away from the latter market following the breakup of Endthisday and Beyond the Sixth Seal, as well as Between the Buried and Me's (who were at the time one of their most successful bands) move from the label to Victory Records.

== Bands ==
- Abnormal Thought Patterns
- Anatagonist A.D
- At the Soundawn
- Between the Buried and Me
- Beyond the Sixth Seal
- Burning Skies
- By Night
- Caliban
- Cataract
- Cipher System
- Confession
- Constraint
- Darwin
- Deadlock
- Deadsoil
- Death Before Disco
- Destinity
- Destiny
- Devilish Impressions
- Dioramic
- Doyle Airence
- Dragbody
- Eden Circus
- End This Day
- Endstand
- Enforsaken
- Fake Idols
- Fall of Serenity
- Fear My Thoughts
- Grand Exit
- Hackneyed
- Hand to Hand
- Hanging Garden
- Heaven Shall Burn
- Hell Within
- Herod
- Intronaut
- Last Leaf Down
- Last Winter
- Lay Siege
- Left to Vanish
- Liar
- Lifeforms
- Light Pupil Dilate
- Man Must Die
- Mindfield
- Miseration
- Nahemah
- Nervecell
- Nightrage
- Omnium Gatherum
- One Without
- Pigeon Toe
- Promethee
- Raintime
- Raunchy
- Ready, Set, Fall!
- Red Eleven
- Seneca
- Shear
- Sons of Aeon
- Sunrise
- The Blackout Argument
- The Chant
- The Last Felony
- The Psyke Project
- The Underwater
- The Year of Our Lord
- This or the Apocalypse
- Thränenkind
- Trivium
- Veil
- War From a Harlots Mouth
- We Are the Damned
- Winterus
- Withered

== See also ==
- List of record labels
