= Heaven Shall Burn discography =

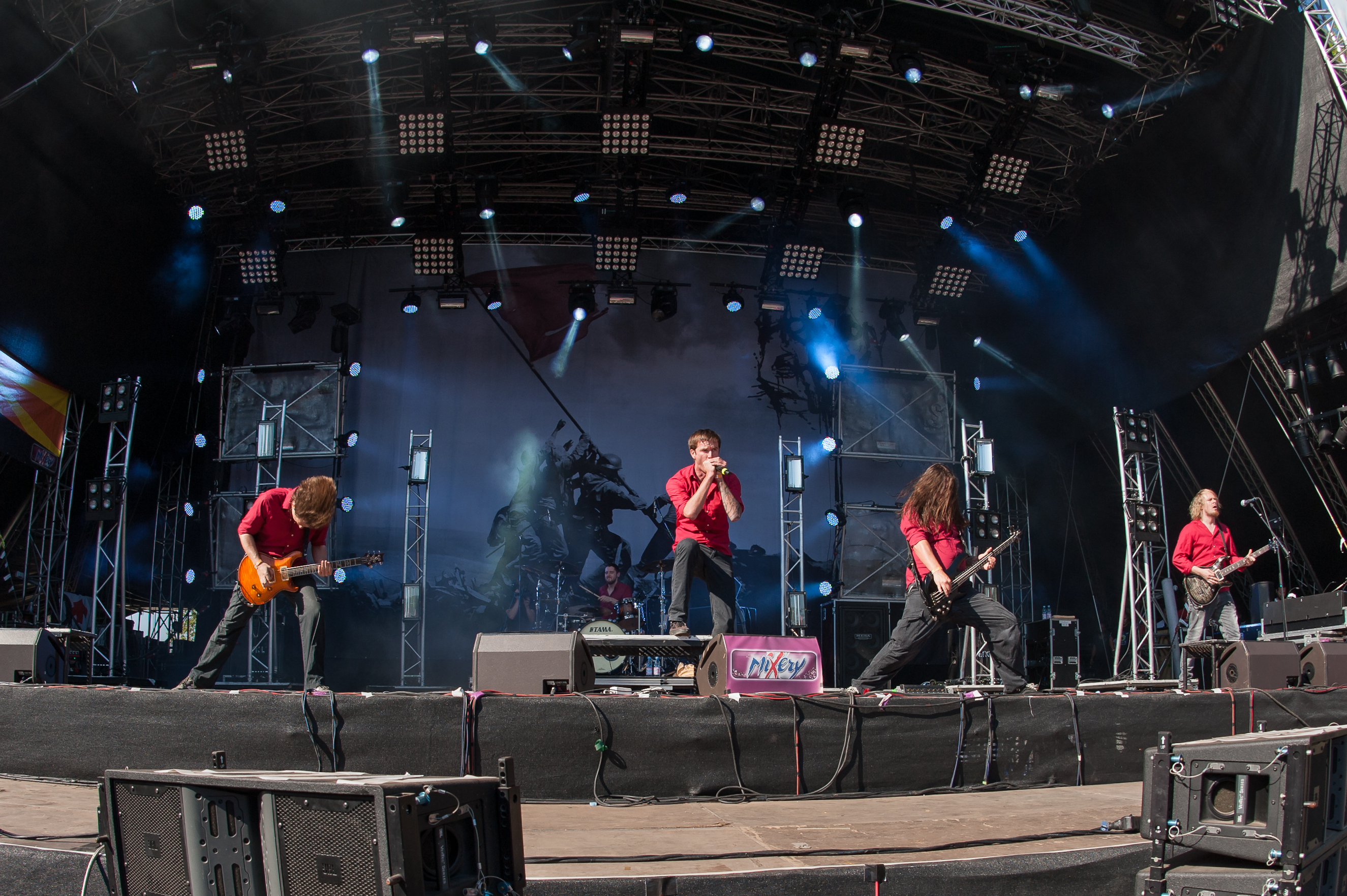
- Heaven Shall Burn performing 2012's Rocco del Schlacko
- Studio albums: 10
- EPs: 1
- Compilation albums: 1
- Video albums: 1
- Music videos: 14
- Split releases: 6

The discography of German melodic death metal band Heaven Shall Burn consists of nine studio albums, one compilation, one EP, one video album and 13 music videos. They were also featured on six split releases, two of which are collaborations with metalcore band Caliban.

== Studio albums ==
List of studio albums, with selected chart positions
Year	Album details	Peak chart positions						
Year	Album details	GER	AUT	SWI	GRE	BEL (FL)	BEL (WA)	US Heat.
2000	Asunder: Released: April 8, 2000; Label: Lifeforce	—	—	—	—	—	—	—
2002	Whatever It May Take: Released: December 10, 2001; Label: Lifeforce	—	—	—	—	—	—	—
2004	Antigone: Released: April 26, 2004; Label: Century Media	—	—	—	—	—	—	—
2006	Deaf to Our Prayers: Released: August 28, 2006; Label: Century Media	22	—	—	—	—	—	—
2008	Iconoclast: Released: January 28, 2008; Label: Century Media	21	65	97	—	—	—	30
2010	Invictus (Iconoclast III): Released: May 21, 2010; Label: Century Media	9	17	38	14	—	—	48
2013	Veto: Released: April 19, 2013; Label: Century Media	2	20	71	—	153	194	14
2016	Wanderer: Released: September 16, 2016; Label: Century Media	3	9	15	—	57	97	—
2020	Of Truth and Sacrifice: Released: March 20, 2020; Label: Century Media	1	4	6	—	157	—	—
2025	Heimat: Released: June 27, 2025; Label: Century Media	2	4	15	—	153	132	—
"—" denotes a recording that did not chart or was not released in that territory.

== Compilation albums ==
List of compilation albums
Year	Album details
2002	In Battle...: Released: August 22, 2002 May 25, 2004 (reissue); Label: Circulation Lifeforce (reissue); Formats: CD
2020	Maximum Sacrifice: Released: March 11, 2020; Label: Century Media; Formats: CD

== Video albums ==
List of video albums, with selected chart positions
Year	Album details	Peak chart position
Year	Album details	GER
2009	Iconoclast II -Bildersturm (The Visual Resistance)-: Released: May 22, 2009; Label: Century Media; Formats: DVD, CD	54

== EPs ==
List of EPs
Year	EP details
1998	In Battle... There Is No Law: Released: 1998 December 18, 2020 (reissue); Label: Deeds of Revolution; Formats: CD vinyl (reissue)
2025	Keinen Schritt Zurück Heimat bonus EP: Released: June 27, 2025; Label: Century Media; Formats: CD

== Split releases ==
List of split albums
Year	Album details
1999	The Heaven Shall Burn / Fall of Serenity Split with Fall of Serenity: Released: December 3, 1999; Label: Deeds of Revolution; Formats: vinyl
2000	The Split Program with Caliban: Released: August 18, 2000; Label: Lifeforce; Formats: CD, vinyl, digital download
2005	Tsunami Benefit with Napalm Death and The Haunted: Released: January 22, 2005; Label: Century Media; Formats: CD
2005	The Split Program II with Caliban: Released: July 26, 2005; Label: Lifeforce; Formats: CD, vinyl, digital download
2015	The Mission Creep with Napalm Death: Released: December 11, 2015; Label: Century Media; Formats: vinyl
2022	European Tour 2023 with Trivium: Released: December 23, 2022; Label: none; Formats: vinyl

== Music videos ==
List of music videos, showing year released and director
Title	Year	Director(s)
"The Weapon They Fear"	2004	—N/a
"Counterweight"	2006	Manuel Schmitt
"Endzeit"	2008	—N/a
"Black Tears"	2009	—N/a
"Combat"	2010	Animaatiokopla
"Hunters Will Be Hunted"	2013	Philipp Hirsch
"Auge Um Auge"	2013	—N/a
"Downshifter"	2016	—N/a
"Passage of the Crane"	2016	Michael Winkler
"Corium"	2017	—N/a
"Protector/Weakness Leaving My Heart"	2020	Philipp Hirsch
"My Heart and the Ocean"	2020	—N/a
"Eradicate"	2020	Isaac Nabwana
"Übermacht"	2020	Philipp Hirsch
"Keinen Schritt Zurück"	2024	Philipp Hirsch & Alexander Dietz
"Schweineherbst"	2025	Alexander Dietz
"My Revocation of Compliance"	2025	Thomas Liebchen
"Confounder"	2025	Janne Hansberg
"Empowerment"	2025	Giacomo "xjoshx" Giorgi
"War Is the Father of All"	2025	Mirko Witzki

== Covered songs ==
Most of Heaven Shall Burn's studio albums include a cover song. A list of songs the band has covered follows:

Original Artist	Song	Album	Notes
Abhinanda	"Competition in Hatred"	In Battle...	
Blind Guardian	"Valhalla"	Veto	featuring Hansi Kürsch of Blind Guardian
Bolt Thrower	"The Fourth Crusade"	Asunder	
Caliban	"One More Lie"	The Split Program	
Day of Suffering	"The Eternal Jihad"	In Battle...	titled "Eternal"
Die Skeptiker	"Straßenkampf"	Antigone	Korean bonus track, later released on the Tsunami Benefit split CD; second guitarist Patrick Schleitzer on lead vocals
Disembodied	"Dislocation"	Antigone	limited edition bonus track
Dritte Wahl	"Auge um Auge"	Dritte Wahl: 25 Jahre - 25 Bands	tribute album; featuring "Mille" Petrozza of Kreator
Edge of Sanity	"Black Tears"	Iconoclast	music video was made for this song
Endstand	"Destroy Fascism"	The Split Program II	also released on the Heimat bonus EP Keinen Schritt Zurück in 2025
Fall of Serenity	"Contrition"	The Heaven Shall Burn / Fall of Serenity Split	
Hate Squad	"Not My God"	Antigone	limited edition bonus track
Killing Joke	"European Super State"	Veto	iTunes bonus track; lead vocals by Katharina Radig
Liar	"Battlecries"	Asunder	
Killswitch Engage	"Numbered Days"	Heimat	featuring Killswitch Engage vocalist Jesse Leach
Life of Agony	"River Runs Red"	Veto	iTunes bonus track
Merauder	"Downfall of Christ"	The Split Program II	
My Dying Bride	"The Cry of Mankind"	Wanderer	deluxe edition bonus track; featuring Adalbjörn Tryggvason of Sólstafir
Nuclear Assault	"Critical Mass"	Of Truth and Sacrifice	featuring Matthias Tarnath of Belgian hardcore band Nasty on guest vocals and a guitar solo by Ralf Klein of German metal band Macbeth
Paradise Lost	"True Belief"	Deaf to Our Prayers	Japanese bonus track
Point of No Return	"Casa de Caboclo"	Whatever It May Take	featuring Andre Moraweck of Maroon and Johannes Formella of the dESTINY program
Powerwolf	"Night of the Werevolves"	The Sacrament of Sin	on the bonus disc Communio Luporum, featuring covers of Powerwolf songs by different bands
Schweisser	"Eisenkopf"	Maximum Sacrifice	also released on the Heimat bonus EP Keinen Schritt Zurück in 2025
Slime	"Schweineherbst"	Keinen Schritt Zurück	together with Dÿse as B-side of the Keinen Schritt Zurück vinyl (feat. Donots); featuring Slime guitarist Michael "Elf" Mayer
Sodom	"Agent Orange"	Wanderer	deluxe edition bonus track; featuring Frank Blackfire of Sodom
Therapy?	"Nowhere"	Invictus	limited edition bonus track
Tiamat	"Whatever That Hurts"	Covering 20 Years of Extremes	compilation album by Century Media
Trivium	"Pillars of Serpents"	European Tour 2023	
