= Tsunami Benefit =

EP by Napalm Death, The Haunted and Heaven Shall Burn
- Released: 22 January 2005
- Genres: Deathgrind, thrash metal, metalcore, deathcore
- Length: 9:24
- Languages: English, German
- Label: Century Media

Napalm Death chronology
Leaders Not Followers: Part 2 (2004)	Tsunami Benefit (2005)	The Code Is Red...Long Live the Code (2005)

The Haunted chronology
Revolver (2004)	Tsunami Benefit (2005)	The Dead Eye (2006)

Heaven Shall Burn chronology
Antigone (2004)	Tsunami Benefit (2005)	The Split Program II (2005)

The Tsunami Benefit split CD single was released in 2005 on Century Media, featuring Napalm Death, The Haunted, and Heaven Shall Burn, with one song from each. It is limited to 1000 copies. "Strassenkampf" is a Die Skeptiker cover.

== Track listing ==
Napalm Death
No.	Title	Length
1.	"The Great and the Good" (feat. Jello Biafra - Vocals)	4:12

The Haunted
No.	Title	Length
2.	"Smut King"	3:09

Heaven Shall Burn
No.	Title	Length
3.	"Strassenkampf"	2:03

== Personnel ==
Napalm Death

- Barney Greenway – lead vocals
- Mitch Harris – guitars, backing vocals
- Shane Embury – bass
- Danny Herrera – drums

The Haunted

- Peter Dolving – vocals
- Anders Björler – lead guitar
- Patrik Jensen – rhythm guitar
- Jonas Björler – bass
- Per Möller Jensen – drums

Heaven Shall Burn

- Marcus Bischoff – vocals
- Maik Weichert – guitars
- Patrick Schleitzer – guitars, lead vocals
- Eric Bischoff – bass
- Matthias Voigt – drums
