= Re:member =

Re:member may refer to:

- Re:member (album), a 2018 album by Ólafur Arnalds
- "Re:member" (Flow song), ninth single of the Japanese band Flow

== See also ==
- Remember (disambiguation)
