= The Split Program II =

Studio album (Split album) by Caliban vs. Heaven Shall Burn
- Released: 26 July 2005
- Recorded: Part I: Spring 2005; Part II: March 2005
- Genres: Metalcore, melodic death metal
- Length: 37:41
- Label: Lifeforce

Caliban vs. Heaven Shall Burn chronology
The Split Program (2000)	The Split Program II (2005)

Caliban chronology
The Opposite From Within (2004)	The Split Program II (2005)	The Undying Darkness (2006)

Heaven Shall Burn chronology
Antigone (2004)	The Split Program II (2005)	Deaf to Our Prayers (2006)

Professional ratings
Review scores
Source	Rating
AllMusic	3.5/5 stars
Blabbermouth.net	7.5/10

The Split Program II is the second split album by German metalcore band Caliban and melodic death metal band Heaven Shall Burn. It was released through Lifeforce Records on 26 July 2005.

== Track listing ==
Part I. Heaven Shall Burn
No.	Title	Original release	Length
1.	"Unleash Enlightment"		5:04
2.	"No One Will Shed a Tear"		4:41
3.	"Nyfædd Von" (Instrumental)		2:49
4.	"If This Is a Man"	The Heaven Shall Burn / Fall Of Serenity Split	2:39
5.	"Downfall of Christ" (Merauder cover)		3:10
6.	"Destroy Fascism" (Endstand cover)		2:00

Part II. Caliban
No.	Title	Original release	Length
7.	"The Revenge"		3:20
8.	"Arena of Concealment"	A Small Boy and a Grey Heaven	3:18
9.	"One Day"	Caliban	2:22
10.	"A Summer Dream"	The Split Program	4:41
11.	"One More Lie"	Caliban	3:36
Total length:			37:41

== Credits ==
Performance and production credits are adapted from the album liner notes.

=== Part I. Heaven Shall Burn ===
==== Personnel ====
Heaven Shall Burn

- Marcus Bischoff – vocals
- Patrick Schleitzer – guitar
- Maik Weichert – guitar
- Eric Bischoff – bass
- Matthias Voigt – drums

Additional musicians

- Ralf Müller – samples, keyboards
- Greta Salóme Stefánsdóttir – violin on "Nyfædd Von"
- Thordur Gudmundur Hermannson – cello on "Nyfædd Von"
- Ólafur Arnalds – piano on "Nyfædd Von"

Production

- Patrick W. Engel – production
- Maik Weichert – co-production
- Alexander Dietz – co-production, engineering
- Ralf Müller – engineering
- Tue Madsen – mixing, mastering
- Ólafur Arnalds – production, mixing of "Nyfædd Von"

==== Studios ====
- The Rape of Harmonies Studio, Germany – recording
- Studio Oloniti, Iceland – production, mixing of "Nyfædd Von"
- The Antfarm, Denmark – mixing, mastering

=== Part II. Caliban ===
==== Personnel ====
Caliban

- Andreas Dörner – vocals
- Marc Görtz – guitar
- Denis Schmidt – guitar, vocals
- Marco Schaller – bass
- Patrick Grün – drums

Production

- Tue Madsen – mixing, mastering

==== Studios ====
- Principal Studios, Senden, Germany – recording
- The Antfarm, Denmark – mixing, mastering
