= Heimat (disambiguation) =

Heimat is a German word with no English equivalent that denotes the relationship of a human being towards a certain spatial social unit.

Heimat may also refer to:

- Heimat (play), an 1893 play by Hermann Sudermann
  - Heimat (1938 film), by Carl Froelich, based on the play
- Heimat (film series), by Edgar Reitz
  - Heimat (1984 film), the first film in the series
- Heimat (album), a 2025 album by Heaven Shall Burn
- Heimat (schooner)
- The Homeland, Neo-Nazi political party in Germany
- BR Heimat, a German radio station

== See also ==
- Heimatfilm, a genre of German-language cinema
- Urheimat, a linguistic homeland, typically for a proto-language
