= Wanderer (Heaven Shall Burn album) =

Studio album by Heaven Shall Burn
- Released: 16 September 2016
- Recorded: 2015–2016
- Studios: Chemical Burn Studios, Germany (recording), Antfarm Studio, Denmark (mixing)
- Genres: Melodic metalcore, melodic death metal, thrash metal
- Length: 58:44
- Languages: English, German
- Label: Century Media
- Producers: Alexander Dietz, Maik Weichert

Heaven Shall Burn chronology
Veto (2013)	Wanderer (2016)	Of Truth and Sacrifice (2020)

Wanderer is the eighth studio album by German melodic death metal band Heaven Shall Burn, released on 16 September 2016 through Century Media Records. The album was released with 12 tracks; a deluxe version was also released with a cover of Sodom's song "Agent Orange" as a bonus track, plus a bonus disc which is a compilation of covers that the band recorded since its inception and also included in previous releases.

The tracks "Bring the War Home" and "Downshifter" were released as promotional singles, including a lyric video for "Bring the War Home."

== Track listing ==
All tracks are written by Heaven Shall Burn.

No.	Title	Length
1.	"The Loss of Fury"	2:21
2.	"Bring the War Home"	4:20
3.	"Passage of the Crane"	3:57
4.	"They Shall Not Pass"	5:33
5.	"Downshifter"	5:59
6.	"Prey to God" (feat. George Fisher of Cannibal Corpse)	3:08
7.	"Agent Orange" (Sodom cover; bonus track on deluxe edition)	6:08
8.	"My Heart Is My Compass"	1:10
9.	"Save Me"	4:57
10.	"Corium"	5:28
11.	"Extermination Order"	3:20
12.	"A River of Crimson"	4:28
13.	"The Cry of Mankind" (My Dying Bride cover)	7:35
14.	"Battle of Attrition" (bonus track on Ltd. deluxe edition)	3:48
Total length:		58:44

Too Good to Steal From
No.	Title	Original artist (date)	Length
1.	"Whatever That Hurts"	Tiamat (1994)	6:02
2.	"Valhalla" (feat. Hansi Kürsch from Blind Guardian)	Blind Guardian (1989)	5:30
3.	"Black Tears"	Edge of Sanity (1994)	3:06
4.	"European Super State" (feat. Katharina Radig)	Killing Joke (2010)	4:32
5.	"Straßenkampf" (German for "Street Fight")	Die Skeptiker (1991)	2:02
6.	"Nowhere"	Therapy? (1994)	2:27
7.	"True Belief"	Paradise Lost (1993)	4:31
8.	"Not My God"	Hate Squad (1995)	3:55
9.	"Destroy Fascism"	Endstand (1998)	1:55
10.	"Dislocation"	Disembodied (1998)	3:35
11.	"Auge um Auge" (German for "An eye for an eye"; feat. Mille Petrozza from Kreator)	Dritte Wahl (1994)	2:52
12.	"Downfall of Christ"	Merauder (1996)	3:11
13.	"River Runs Red"	Life of Agony (1993)	1:51
Total length:			45:30

== Personnel ==
Heaven Shall Burn

- Marcus Bischoff – vocals
- Alexander Dietz – guitars, production, engineer
- Maik Weichert – guitars, co-production
- Eric Bischoff – bass
- Christian Bass – drums

Additional musicians

- René Liedtke - lead guitars, additional vocals
- George Corpsegrinder Fisher - vocals (track 6)
- Aðalbjörn Tryggvason - vocals (track 13)
- Nick Hipa - guitar (track 9)
- Frank Blackfire - guitar (track 7)

== Charts ==
Chart (2016)	Peak position
Austrian Albums (Ö3 Austria)	9
Belgian Albums (Ultratop Flanders)	57
Belgian Albums (Ultratop Wallonia)	97
German Albums (Offizielle Top 100)	3
Japanese Albums (Oricon)	200
Swiss Albums (Schweizer Hitparade)	15
