= Asunder =

Asunder may refer to:

- Asunder (software), a CD-ripping program for Linux and BSD
- Asunder (album), a 2000 album by Heaven Shall Burn, released in 2000
- Asunder (Terriers), an episode of the TV series Terriers
