= Remember =

Remember may refer to:

== Film and television ==
=== Film ===
- Remember (1926 film), an American silent drama film
- Remember? (1939 film), an American romantic comedy
- Remember (2015 film), a Canadian film by Atom Egoyan
- Remember? (2018 film), an Italian-French romance film
- Remember (2022 film), a South Korean action film
- Remember (2026 film), a Philippine drama film by Mae Cruz-Alviar

=== Television ===
- Remember (TV series), a 2015–2016 South Korean thriller series
- "Remember" (The Amazing Digital Circus), a 2026 episode
- "Remember" (Desperate Housewives), a 2006 two-part episode
- "Remember" (Star Trek: Voyager), a 1996 episode
- "Remember" (The Walking Dead), a 2015 episode
- "Remember", an episode of Kamen Rider ZEZTZ

== Literature ==
- Remember, a 1921 fantasy novella by Mateiu Caragiale
- "Remember", a poem by Christina Rossetti
- Remember (novel), a 1991 romance novel by Barbara Taylor Bradford

== Music ==
=== Albums ===
- Remember (BigBang album), 2008
- Remember (The Fiery Furnaces album), 2008
- Remember (Hiroyuki Sawano album) or the title song, 2019
- Remember (Rusted Root album), 1996
- Remember (S.E.S. album) or the title song, 2017
- Remember (Winner album) or the title song, 2020
- Remember..., by Janis Ian, 1978
- Re:member (album), by Ólafur Arnalds, or the title song, 2018
- Remember (The Great Adventure), by Michael Rother, or the title song, 2004
- Remember: A Tribute to Wes Montgomery, by Pat Martino, 2006
- Remember: Michael Feinstein Sings Irving Berlin, 1987
- Remember, by Crystal Lewis, 1991
- Remember, by John Lennon, 2006
- Remember, by Mikuni Shimokawa, 2006
- Remember, by Peaches & Herb, 1983
- Remember (EP), by T-ara, 2016

=== Songs ===
- "Remember" (Becky Hill and David Guetta song), 2021
- "Remember" (Disturbed song), 2002
- "Remember" (Fayray song), 2002
- "Re:member" (Flow song), 2006
- "Remember" (Gryffin and Zohara song), 2018
- "Remember" (High and Mighty Color song), 2008
- "Remember" (Irving Berlin song), 1925
- "Remember" (John Lennon song), 1970
- "Remember" (Pink Lady song), 1980
- "Remember" (Steve Angello song), 2015
- "Remember (Sha-La-La-La)", by Bay City Rollers, 1974
- "Remember (The First Time)", by Eric Gable, 1989
- "Remember (Walking in the Sand)", by the Shangri-Las, 1964; covered by Aerosmith, 1979
- "Remember", by Air from Moon Safari, 1998
- "Remember", by Apink from Pink Memory, 2015
- "Remember", by Ariana Grande, unreleased (2019)
- "Remember", by Asake from Work of Art, 2023
- "Remember", by Burden of a Day from OneOneThousand, 2009
- "Remember", by Bryan Adams from Bryan Adams, 1980
- "Remember", by BT from ESCM, 1996
- "Remember", by the Corrs from Talk on Corners, 1997
- "Remember", by Earshot, 2014
- "Remember", by Free from Fire and Water, 1970
- "Remember", by Gino Soccio, 1982
- "Remember", by Groove Coverage from 7 Years and 50 Days, 2004
- "Remember", by the Jimi Hendrix Experience from Are You Experienced, 1967
- "Remember", by Keke Wyatt from Ke'Ke', 2014
- "Remember", by Lauren Daigle from Look Up Child, 2018
- "Remember", by Liam Payne from LP1, 2019
- "Remember", by the Linda Lindas from Growing Up, 2022
- "Remember", by Nigo from I Know Nigo!, 2022
- "Remember", by Saves the Day from Saves the Day, 2013
- "Remember", by Seinabo Sey from I'm a Dream, 2018
- "Remember", by Seven Lions, Au5, and Crystal Skies, 2020
- "Remember", by Sneaky Sound System from From Here to Anywhere, 2011
- "Remember", by Ten Mile Tide
- "Remember", by the Underdog Project, 2004

== People ==
- Remember Baker (1737–1775), American company captain of the Green Mountain Boys
- Remember L. H. Lord (1864–1938), American businessman and politician

== See also ==
- Recall (disambiguation)
- Remembrance (disambiguation)
