= The Split Program =

2000 split album by Caliban and Heaven Shall Burn

Studio album (split album) by Caliban vs. Heaven Shall Burn
- Released: 18 August 2000
- Recorded: 1999
- Genres: Metalcore, melodic death metal
- Length: 31:56
- Label: Lifeforce
- Producer: Jamie King

Caliban chronology
A Small Boy And A Grey Heaven (1999)	The Split Program (2000)	Vent (2001)

Heaven Shall Burn chronology
Asunder (2000)	The Split Program (2000)	Whatever It May Take (2001)

The Split Program is the first split album by German metalcore band Caliban and melodic death metal band Heaven Shall Burn, released on 18 August 2000. "Partisan" is performed by Caliban on the album, but is originally a Heaven Shall Burn composition, while "One More Lie" was composed by Caliban and is covered by Heaven Shall Burn. The intro is a piece of a composition by Wojciech Kilar that is also use in the soundtrack for Bram Stoker's Dracula. Track 6 is an audio clip taken from the 1994 Quentin Tarantino film Pulp Fiction. Caliban have since redone "A Summerdream" (written as "A Summer Dream") and "One More Lie" on 2005's The Split Program II.

== Track listing ==
Part I. Caliban
No.	Title	Length
1.	"Intro"	0:32
2.	"Assassin of Love"	3:22
3.	"A Summerdream"	3:56
4.	"Sunday's Words"	3:32
5.	"Partisan" (Heaven Shall Burn cover)	3:18
6.	"Outro"	0:51

Part II. Heaven Shall Burn
No.	Title	Length
7.	"Suffocated In The Exhaust of Our Machines"	4:58
8.	"No Single Inch"	2:41
9.	"The Seventh Cross"	3:42
10.	"One More Lie" (Caliban cover)	5:04

== Personnel ==
Caliban

- Andreas Dörner – vocals
- Marc Görtz – guitars
- Thomas Sielemann – guitars
- Engin Güres – bass
- Rober Krämer – drums

Heaven Shall Burn

- Marcus Bischoff – vocals
- Maik Weichert – guitars
- Patrick Schleitzer – guitars
- Eric Bischoff – bass
- Matthias Voigt – drums
