= Talos (musician) =

Irish musician (1987–2024)

- Born: Eoin French; 2 October 1987; Ireland
- Origin: Cork, Ireland
- Died: 11 August 2024 (aged 36) Cork, Ireland
- Genres: Indie electronic
- Occupation: Musician
- Years active: 2013–2024
- Labels: Feel Good Lost Records, BMG
- Formerly of: Hush War Cry
- Website: thisistalos.com

Eoin French (2 October 1987 – 11 August 2024), known professionally as Talos, was an Irish indie electronic musician from Cork.

== Personal life ==
Eoin French grew up on the north side of Cork. He trained as an architect and lectured in architecture at University College Cork. He later studied at Cork School of Music.

French divided his time between Clonakilty, Ireland, and Reykjavík, Iceland.

He died following a short illness in Cork, on 11 August 2024, at the age of 36.

== Career ==
In his early 20s, French was a member of the band Hush War Cry. He started performing as Talos in 2013. This stage name was a reference to the mythical Talos, a giant automaton made of bronze that protected Crete.

Talos' first album, Wild Alee, was nominated for the Choice Music Prize, and The Irish Times awarded it four stars, calling it "a spectacularly assured debut deserving of a wide audience". His second album, Far Out Dust, was released in 2019. His third album, Dear Chaos, came out on 7 October 2022. His last EP, Sun Divider, a collaboration with Icelandic composer Atli Örvarsson, was released posthumously, on 6 December 2024. In 2025, another posthumous album, this one a collaboration with Icelandic musician Ólafur Arnalds, titled A Dawning, was published.

== Legacy ==
In a televised tribute to Talos, a group featuring friends and fellow musicians including Dermot Kennedy, Ólafur Arnalds, and Ye Vagabonds performed a song co-written by him on The Tommy Tiernan Show in January 2025.

== Discography ==
=== Studio albums ===
- Wild Alee (2017)
- Far Out Dust (2019)
- Dear Chaos (2022)
- A Dawning (Ólafur Arnalds & Talos) (2025)

=== EPs ===
- Tethered Bones (2014)
- O Sanctum (2016)
- Live at St. Luke's (2018)
- Sun Divider with Atli Örvarsson (2024)
