= Invictus (Iconoclast III) =

Studio album by Heaven Shall Burn
- Released: May 21, 2010
- Genres: Melodic death metal; metalcore
- Length: 45:08
- Languages: English, German
- Label: Century Media
- Producers: Alexander Dietz, Maik Weichert

Heaven Shall Burn chronology
Iconoclast (2008)	Invictus (Iconoclast III) (2010)	Veto (2013)

Professional ratings
Review scores
Source	Rating
About.com	2.5/5 stars
AllMusic	2/5 stars
PopMatters	9/10
Rock Hard	9.0/10
Sputnikmusic	2.5/5

Invictus (Iconoclast III) is the sixth studio album by German melodic death metal band Heaven Shall Burn and is the last part of the Iconoclast trilogy, following their previous studio album Iconoclast released in 2008 and the live CD/DVD Iconoclast II -Bildersturm (The Visual Resistance)- released in 2009. The band uploaded the songs "Combat" and "The Omen" on their Myspace profile as a preview. It was released on May 21, 2010 in Germany, Austria and Switzerland. On June 8, 2010 it was released in the United States. The album entered the German Media Control Charts at No. 9. Selling 900 copies in the first week Invictus entered the US Top Heatseekers at No. 48

== Track listing ==
No.	Title	Writer(s)	Length
1.	"Intro"		1:10
2.	"The Omen"		3:38
3.	"Combat"		3:48
4.	"I Was I Am I Shall Be"		3:56
5.	"Buried in Forgotten Grounds"		5:33
6.	"Sevastopol"		4:04
7.	"The Lie You Bleed for"		4:41
8.	"Return to Sanity"		3:20
9.	"Against Bridge Burners"		3:29
10.	"Of Forsaken Poets"		4:32
11.	"Nowhere" (Therapy? cover, Limited Edition bonus track)	Andy Cairns	2:25
12.	"Given in Death"		5:12
13.	"Outro"		1:46
Total length:			47:34

Bonus DVD: "Defending Sparta" (Live in Vienna, February 21, 2010)
No.	Title	Writer(s)	Length
1.	"Forlorn Skies"
2.	"Counterweight"
3.	"Voice of the Voiceless"
4.	"Endzeit"
5.	"Buried in Forgotten Grounds"
6.	"The Disease"
7.	"Architects of the Apocalypse"
8.	"The Omen"
9.	"Unleash Enlightment"
10.	"Of no Avail"
11.	"Black Tears" (Edge of Sanity cover)	Dan Swanö
12.	"Behind a Wall of Silence"

The limited edition includes, a wristband, a sticker and a bonus DVD containing a special live performance in Vienna with the theme "Defending Sparta". Inspired by the movie 300, the band chose 300 fans, gave them special T-shirts and let them have a battle on the band's music.

== Credits ==
Production and performance credits are adapted from the album liner notes.

Heaven Shall Burn

- Marcus Bischoff – vocals
- Alexander Dietz – guitars, producer, engineer
- Maik Weichert – guitars, producer
- Eric Bischoff – bass
- Matthias Voigt – drums

Production

- Tue Madsen – mixing, mastering
- Patrick W. Engel – engineering, additional guitars and bass
- Ralf Müller – engineering
- Red Design – box design
- Joshua Andrew Belanger – digipak design
- Stefan Wibbeke – additional design

Additional musicians

- Sabine Weniger (Deadlock) – additional vocals on "Given in Death"
- Sebastian Reichl (Deadlock) – additional guitar on "Given in Death"
- Patrick Schleitzer – additional vocals
- Ólafur Arnalds – "Intro" and "Outro"

Production ("Defending Sparta")

- Alexander Dietz – recording, mixing
- Patrick W. Engel – mixing, mastering
- Werner Stockinger – show production
- Benjamin Mahnert – show production
- Maik Weichert – show production
- Steffen "Slayer" Jochmann – FoH sound
- Martin Kames – light design

== Release history ==
Region	Date
Germany, Austria, Switzerland	May 21, 2010
United Kingdom, Belgium, Netherlands, Luxembourg, France, Greece, Denmark, Norway, Portugal, Europe	May 24, 2010
Spain, Italy	May 25, 2010
Sweden, Finland, Hungary	May 26, 2010
North America	June 8, 2010

== Chart performance ==
Chart (2010)	Peak position
Austrian Albums (Ö3 Austria)	17
German Albums (Offizielle Top 100)	9
Greek Albums (IFPI)	14
Japanese Albums (Oricon)	258
Swiss Albums (Schweizer Hitparade)	38
US Top Heatseekers Albums (Billboard)	48
