= Eulogy for Evolution =

Studio album by Ólafur Arnalds
- Released: 1 October 2007
- Genres: Post-rock, ambient, minimalism, Neoclassical
- Length: 39:29
- Label: Erased Tapes
- Producer: Ólafur Arnalds

Ólafur Arnalds chronology
| Eulogy for Evolution (2007) | Variations of Static (2008) |

Professional ratings
Review scores
| Source | Rating |
|---|---|
| AllMusic | 3.5/5 stars |
| Exclaim! | 9/10 |
| Irish Times | 4/5 stars |
| PopMatters | 10/10 stars |

Eulogy for Evolution is Icelandic producer Ólafur Arnalds' first studio album, released on 1 October 2007 by Erased Tapes Records. With the album, Arnalds set out to document the journey of life, from birth to death.

The album was reissued and remastered for its tenth anniversary on 25 August 2017. The reissue, entitled Eulogy for Evolution 2017, was remastered by Nils Frahm and features new cover artwork and an expanded booklet featuring new photography.

== Track listing ==
All tracks are written by Ólafur Arnalds.

Eulogy for Evolution track listing
| No. | Title | Length |
|---|---|---|
| 1. | "0040" | 4:28 |
| 2. | "0048/0729" | 5:24 |
| 3. | "0952" | 3:04 |
| 4. | "1440" | 6:57 |
| 5. | "1953" | 8:06 |
| 6. | "3055" | 5:26 |
| 7. | "3326" | 3:38 |
| 8. | "3704/3837" | 2:35 |
| Total length: | | 39:29 |

== Charts ==
Chart performance for Eulogy for Evolution 2017
| Chart (2017) | Peak position |
|---|---|
| UK Album Downloads (Official Charts) | 98 |
| UK Independent Albums (Official Charts) | 39 |
