= Of Truth and Sacrifice =

Studio album by Heaven Shall Burn
- Released: 20 March 2020
- Genres: Melodic death metal, metalcore
- Length: 97:33
- Languages: English; German
- Label: Century Media
- Producers: Alexander Dietz; Maik Weichert

Heaven Shall Burn chronology
Wanderer (2016)	Of Truth and Sacrifice (2020)	Heimat (2025)

Singles from Of Truth and Sacrifice
- 1. "Weakness Leaving My Heart" Released: 10 January 2020; 2. "Protector" Released: 10 January 2020; 3. "My Heart and the Ocean" Released: 7 February 2020

Professional ratings
Review scores
Source	Rating
Kerrang!	2/5
Metal.de	8/10
Metal Hammer	6.5/7
Sputnikmusic	4.0/5

Of Truth and Sacrifice is the ninth studio album by German melodic death metal band Heaven Shall Burn, released on 20 March 2020 through Century Media Records. The album consists of two parts; volume one titled "Of Truth" with ten tracks and volume two called "Of Sacrifice" with nine tracks. Both parts include all but one original song; on volume two the band covered Nuclear Assault's 1989 song "Critical Mass". At 97 minutes runtime, the band released their longest album to date.

The album was supported by the singles "Weakness Leaving My Heart", "Protector" and "My Heart and the Ocean" released in January and February 2020, respectively. The music video for "Eradicate" was made by famed Ugandan ultra-low budget studio Wakaliwood.

Commercially, the album debuted at number one in Germany, becoming the band's first album to do so.

== Track listing ==
All tracks are written by Heaven Shall Burn, except where noted.

Of Truth
No.	Title	Length
1.	"March of Retribution"	1:21
2.	"Thoughts and Prayers"	4:58
3.	"Eradicate" (featuring Ralf Klein)	4:32
4.	"Protector"	5:26
5.	"Übermacht"	5:25
6.	"My Heart and the Ocean"	5:51
7.	"Expatriate"	8:53
8.	"What War Means"	5:31
9.	"Terminate the Unconcern" (featuring Andy Dörner)	4:42
10.	"The Ashes of My Enemies"	2:02
Total length:		48:41

Of Sacrifice
No.	Title	Writer(s)	Length
1.	"Children of a Lesser God"		6:35
2.	"La Résistance"		5:06
3.	"The Sorrows of Victory" (featuring Chris Harms)		8:25
4.	"Stateless"		3:49
5.	"Tirpitz"		5:54
6.	"Truther"		2:41
7.	"Critical Mass" (Nuclear Assault cover, featuring Matthias Tarnath)	Anthony Bramante; Daniel Lilker; Glenn Evans; John Connelly	3:35
8.	"Eagles Among Vultures"		5:06
9.	"Weakness Leaving My Heart"		7:31
Total length:			48:42

== Charts ==
Sales chart performance for Of Truth and Sacrifice
Chart (2020)	Peak position
Austrian Albums (Ö3 Austria)	4
Belgian Albums (Ultratop Flanders)	157
German Albums (Offizielle Top 100)	1
Japanese Albums (Oricon)	180
Spanish Albums (PROMUSICAE)	25
Swiss Albums (Schweizer Hitparade)	6

=== Year-end charts ===
Chart (2020)	Position
German Albums (Offizielle Top 100)	96
