= Veto (album) =

Studio album by Heaven Shall Burn
- Released: April 19, 2013
- Recorded: 2012
- Studios: Chemical Burn Studios, Germany (recording), Antfarm Studio, Denmark (mixing)
- Genres: Melodic death metal, metalcore
- Length: 49:22
- Languages: English, German
- Label: Century Media
- Producers: Alexander Dietz, Maik Weichert

Heaven Shall Burn chronology
Invictus (Iconoclast III) (2010)	Veto (2013)	Wanderer (2016)

Professional ratings
Review scores
Source	Rating
Exclaim!	6/10
Metal Hammer	6/10
Rock Hard	9.0/10
Sputnikmusic	3.9/5

Veto is the seventh studio album by German melodic death metal band Heaven Shall Burn, released on 19 April 2013 through Century Media Records. The album entered the US Top Heatseekers albums at No. 14 selling 1,175 copies in the first week.

== Track listing ==
All tracks are written by Heaven Shall Burn, except where noted.

Standard Edition CD
No.	Title	Lyrics	Music	Length
1.	"Godiva"			4:20
2.	"Land of the Upright Ones"			4:09
3.	"Die Stürme rufen Dich" (German: "The storms call out for you")			4:00
4.	"Fallen"			4:30
5.	"Hunters Will Be Hunted"			6:00
6.	"You Will Be Godless"			3:11
7.	"Valhalla" (Blind Guardian cover)	Hansi Kürsch	Hansi Kürsch, André Olbrich, Marcus Siepen, Thomas Stauch	5:30
8.	"Antagonized"			3:34
9.	"Like Gods Among Mortals"			4:21
10.	"53 Nations"			4:07
11.	"Beyond Redemption"			5:47
Total length:				49:02

Special Edition bonus tracks
No.	Title	Writer(s)	Length
12.	"European Super State" (Killing Joke cover)	Killing Joke	4:31
Total length:			53:53

Korean Edition bonus tracks
No.	Title	Writer(s)	Length
12.	"Nowhere" (Therapy? cover)	Andy Cairns	2:25
Total length:			51:47

iTunes deluxe version bonus tracks
No.	Title	Writer(s)	Length
12.	"European Super State" (Killing Joke cover)	Jaz Coleman, Martin Glover, Geordie Walker, Paul Ferguson	4:31
13.	"River Runs Red" (Life of Agony cover)		1:51
14.	"Whatever It May Take 2013"		3:44
Total length:			59:28

Bonus CD: 500.Live (Live in Saalfeld, 21. December 2012)
No.	Title	Writer(s)	Length
1.	"Counterweight"		4:38
2.	"Profane Believers"		3:35
3.	"The Only Truth"		4:23
4.	"The Omen"		3:54
5.	"Voice of the Voiceless"		4:14
6.	"Behind a Wall of Silence"		3:52
7.	"Combat"		3:43
8.	"Forlorn Skies"		4:17
9.	"Whatever It May Take"		3:49
10.	"The Disease"		3:02
11.	"Trespassing the Shores of Your World"		5:30
12.	"Endzeit"		5:29
13.	"Black Tears" (Edge of Sanity cover)	Dan Swanö	3:12
14.	"To Inherit the Guilt"		3:28
15.	"The Weapon They Fear"		4:15
Total length:			1:01:11

Blizzard Over England Mix
No.	Title	Writer(s)	Length
1.	"Godiva"		4:23
2.	"Land of the Upright Ones"		4:07
3.	"Die Stürme rufen Dich"		4:19
4.	"Fallen"		4:36
5.	"Hunters Will Be Hunted"		5:59
6.	"You Will Be Godless"		3:10
7.	"Valhalla" (Blind Guardian cover)	Blind Guardian	5:30
8.	"Antagonized"		3:33
9.	"Like Gods Among Mortals"		3:32
10.	"53 Nations"		4:17
11.	"Beyond Redemption"		5:43
Total length:			49:04

== Personnel ==
Production and performance credits are adapted from the album liner notes.

Heaven Shall Burn

- Marcus Bischoff – vocals
- Alexander Dietz – guitars, producer, engineer
- Maik Weichert – guitars, co-producer
- Eric Bischoff – bass
- Matthias Voigt – drums

Additional musicians

- René Liedtke – additional lead and solo guitars on "Valhalla" and "Beyond Redemption", choir on "Valhalla"
- Alexander Klopp – solo guitars on "Land of the Upright Ones", choir on "Valhalla"
- Ralf Klein – solo guitars on "Land of the Upright Ones", choir on "Valhalla"
- Rob Franssen (Born from Pain) – chorus vocals, backing vocals on "Die Stürme rufen Dich"
- Dominik Stammen (Born from Pain) – chorus vocals, backing vocals on "Die Stürme rufen Dich"
- Hansi Kürsch (Blind Guardian) – guest vocals on "Valhalla", choir on "Valhalla"
- Dan Wilding (Carcass) – additional percussion and drums
- Katharina Radig – vocals on "European Super State", choir on "Valhalla"
- Benjamin Mahnert – choir on "Valhalla"
- Elsterglanz – choir on "Valhalla"
- Patrick W. Engel – choir on "Valhalla"

Production

- Tue Madsen – mixing, mastering
- Patrick Wittstock – design, layout
- John Collier – front cover (Lady Godiva)

Production (500.Live)

- Lars Dietrich – live recording
- Sebastian "Seeb" Levermann – live recording
- Alexander Dietz – mixing, mastering
- Christian Thiele – photography

Production (Blizzard Over England Mix)

- Colin Richardson – mixing, mastering
- Carl Bown – mixing engineer

== Release history ==
Region	Date
Germany, Austria, Switzerland, Norway	April 19, 2013
Europe	April 22, 2013
Australia, New Zealand, Finland	April 26, 2013
US, Canada	April 30, 2013

== Chart performance ==
Chart (2014)	Peak position
Austrian Albums (Ö3 Austria)	20
Belgian Albums (Ultratop Flanders)	153
Belgian Albums (Ultratop Wallonia)	194
German Albums (Offizielle Top 100)	2
Swiss Albums (Schweizer Hitparade)	71
US Heatseekers Albums (Billboard)	14
