= Antigone (Heaven Shall Burn album) =

Studio album by Heaven Shall Burn
- Released: 26 April 2004
- Studios: Rape of Harmonies Studios, Germany
- Genres: Melodic death metal; metalcore; deathcore
- Length: 48:43
- Label: Century Media
- Producer: Patrick W. Engel

Heaven Shall Burn chronology
Whatever It May Take (2001)	Antigone (2004)	Deaf to Our Prayers (2006)

Antigone (/ænˈtɪɡəni/ ann-TIG-ə-nee) is the third studio album by German melodic death metal band Heaven Shall Burn. It was released on 26 April 2004 through Century Media Records and is the last album with guitarist Patrick Schleitzer, who left the band in 2005 and was replaced by current guitarist Alexander Dietz.

== Background ==
The title was inspired by the female character of the play Antigone by Sophocles. The play is about a passionate young woman, that does what she knows is right, even though it is against the law. She makes sure that all of the town's people know what she did and she is punished by the king.

The intro and the two outros were composed and recorded by Icelandic composer Ólafur Arnalds. A video was made for "The Weapon They Fear", a song that commemorates Víctor Jara. "Tree of Freedom" deals with the life of Nelson Mandela. "Voice of the Voiceless" refers to the band's strong vegan stance. "Bleeding to Death" deals with the economic and social problems in the former East Germany, from where the band originates.

The song "The Dream is Dead" was featured in an episode of Viva la Bam, entitled "Viva La Europe Pt. 2".

== Reception ==
Professional ratings
Review scores
Source	Rating
AllMusic	4/5 stars
Exclaim!	Not favorable
Rock Hard	9.0/10
Sputnikmusic	4.5/5
Sputnikmusic	4/5

In 2005, Antigone was ranked number 474 in Rock Hard magazine's book The 500 Greatest Rock & Metal Albums of All Time.

== Track listing ==
All lyrics are written by Maik Weichert.

No.	Title	Music	Length
1.	"Echoes (Intro)"	Arnalds	1:29
2.	"The Weapon They Fear"		4:38
3.	"The Only Truth"		4:30
4.	"Architects of the Apocalypse"		4:01
5.	"Voice of the Voiceless"		4:53
6.	"Numbing the Pain"		5:36
7.	"To Harvest the Storm"		4:45
8.	"Rìsandi Von (Outro)"	Arnalds	1:32
9.	"Bleeding to Death"		4:15
10.	"Tree of Freedom"		4:50
11.	"The Dream Is Dead"		4:41
12.	"Deyjandi Von (Outro)"	Arnalds	3:38
Total length:			48:43

European Special Packing
No.	Title	Writer(s)	Length
13.	"Dislocation" (Disembodied cover)	Disembodied	3:35
14.	"Not My God" (Hate Squad cover)	Hate Squad	3:56
Total length:			56:13

Korean Edition
No.	Title	Length
13.	"Straßenkampf" (Die Skeptiker cover)	2:03

Notes

- Track 8's title is Icelandic and means "Rising Hope", but it contains a spelling mistake, as rísa is written with an í, not an ì. This error is present on all releases of the album.
- Track 12's title is Icelandic and means "Dying Hope".

== Credits ==
Production and performance credits are adapted from the album liner notes.

Heaven Shall Burn

- Marcus Bischoff – vocals
- Maik Weichert – guitars
- Patrick Schleitzer – guitars
- Eric Bischoff – bass
- Matthias Voigt – drums

Additional musicians

- Alexander Dietz – clean vocals on "To Harvest the Storm", "The Dream Is Dead"
- Ólafur Arnalds – piano, samples, keyboard on "Echoes", "Rìsandi Von", "Deyjandi Von"
- Greta Salome Stefansdottir – violin on "Echoes", "Rìsandi Von", "Deyjandi Von"
- Thordur Gudmundur Herrmannson – cello on "Echoes", "Rìsandi Von", "Deyjandi Von"

Production

- Patrick W. Engel – production
- Ralf Müller – engineering
- Kai Tenneberg – assisting engineering
- Tue Madsen – mixing, mastering
- Ólafur Arnalds – production, engineering on "Echoes", "Rìsandi Von", "Deyjandi Von"

Artwork and design

- Spiros Antoniou (Set<'H>dEsign) – artwork
- Stefan Luedicke – layout
- Stefan Wibbeke – layout
- Simon Büttner – band photo

== Release history ==
Region	Date	Label	Format	Catalog #
Europe	26 April 2004	Century Media Records	Compact Disc	—N/a
USA	15 June 2004	Century Media Records	CD, digital download	—N/a
—N/a	2004	Lifeforce Records	Vinyl	—N/a
Japan	20 April 2005	Howling Bull	CD	HWCY-1189
Russia	18 December 2007	Mazzar Records	CD	MYST CD 264
South Korea	16 April 2004	Dope Entertainment	CD	—N/a
South America	30 May 2004	Liberation Records	CD	LIB030
