= Heaven Shall Burn =

German extreme metal band

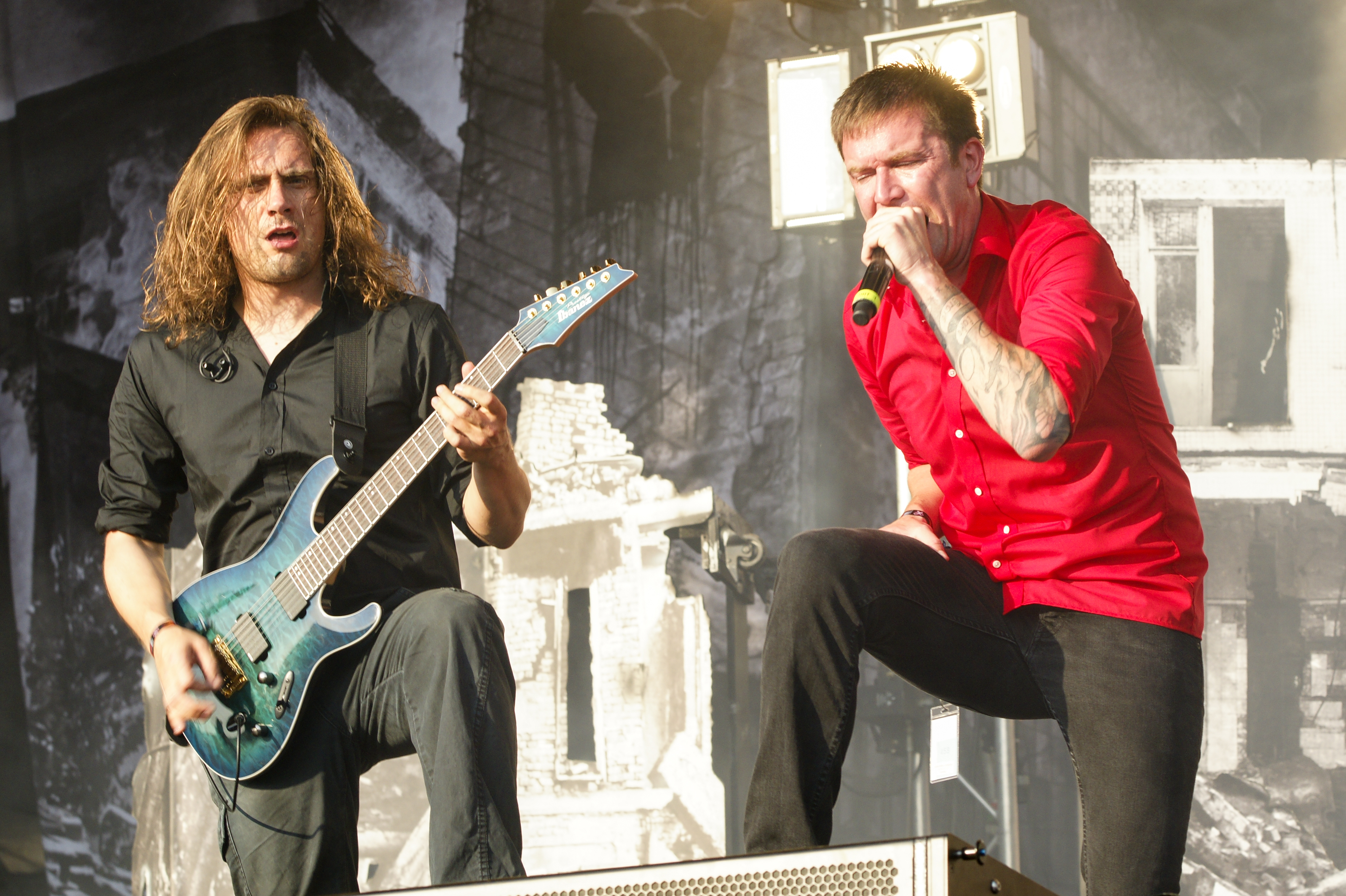
- Guitarist Maik Weichert and vocalist Marcus Bischoff performing at Deichbrand 2014

Background information
- Also known as: B4 the Fall (1995–1997); Consense (1997–1998)
- Origin: Saalfeld, Germany
- Genres: Melodic death metal; metalcore; deathcore
- Years active: 1995–present
- Labels: Lifeforce; Century Media
- Members: Maik Weichert; Marcus Bischoff; Eric Bischoff; Alexander Dietz; Christian Bass
- Past members: Michael Hartmann; Patrick Schleitzer; Matthias Voigt
- Website: heavenshallburn.com

Heaven Shall Burn is a German extreme metal band from Saalfeld, formed in 1995. The band consists of vocalist Marcus Bischoff, guitarists Maik Weichert and Alexander Dietz, bassist Eric Bischoff and drummer Christian Bass. They are currently signed to Century Media. They have released ten studio albums and a number of other records. Their albums Veto entered the German album charts at number 2 in 2013, with their latest, Of Truth and Sacrifice, reaching number 1.

== History ==
=== Formation and In Battle... There Is No Law (1995–1999) ===
Guitarist Maik Weichert and drummer Matthias Voigt formed Heaven Shall Burn in May 1995 as B4 the Fall, with vocalist Müller, second guitarist Michael Hartmann, and bassist Slabon. They debuted live on December 27, 1995, at the Fucking Christmas event in Kranichfeld, and performed shows throughout 1996, including the first Party.San Metal Open Air, then known as "Tiefengruben Open Air" in Bad Berka. At the same festival, cousins Marcus and Eric Bischoff performed with their band Das kranke Hirn. By April 1997, B4 the Fall renamed to Consense and in July, they performed once at the Tiefengruben Open Air with Das kranke Hirn. In winter 1997, Consense recorded their first demo, The Eve of the Storm, and in early 1998, the Bischoff cousins joined the band as vocalist and bassist, respectively. Consense recorded a second demo, titled Demo Jan. 1998, which led to a contract with Deeds of Revolution Records. The band began recording their debut EP In Battle... There Is No Law in summer 1998, but renamed for a second time to Heaven Shall Burn before the EP's release. The EP was released through Deeds of Revolution Records in late 1998, and a split album with label mates Fall of Serenity was released in 1999. Around this time, third guitarist Patrick Schleitzer joined Heaven Shall Burn and they played as a sextet on the Seed of the Next Season compilation. Before entering the Rape of Harmony studios to record their debut album, Hartmann left the band.

=== Asunder, The Split Program and Whatever It May Take (2000–2003) ===
After their shared release with Fall of Serenity, they signed to Lifeforce Records. Lifeforce released Heaven Shall Burn's debut album, Asunder, and a collaboration with Caliban, The Split Program, in 2000. Heaven Shall Burn toured Europe and South America. In 2001, Heaven Shall Burn released their second album, Whatever It May Take, and re-issued the In Battle... EP in 2002. To support the album, the band toured numerous countries, including Greece, Iceland and the UK. They played German festivals such as Party.San, With Full Force and Wacken Open Air.

=== Antigone, The Split Program II and Deaf to Our Prayers (2004–2006) ===
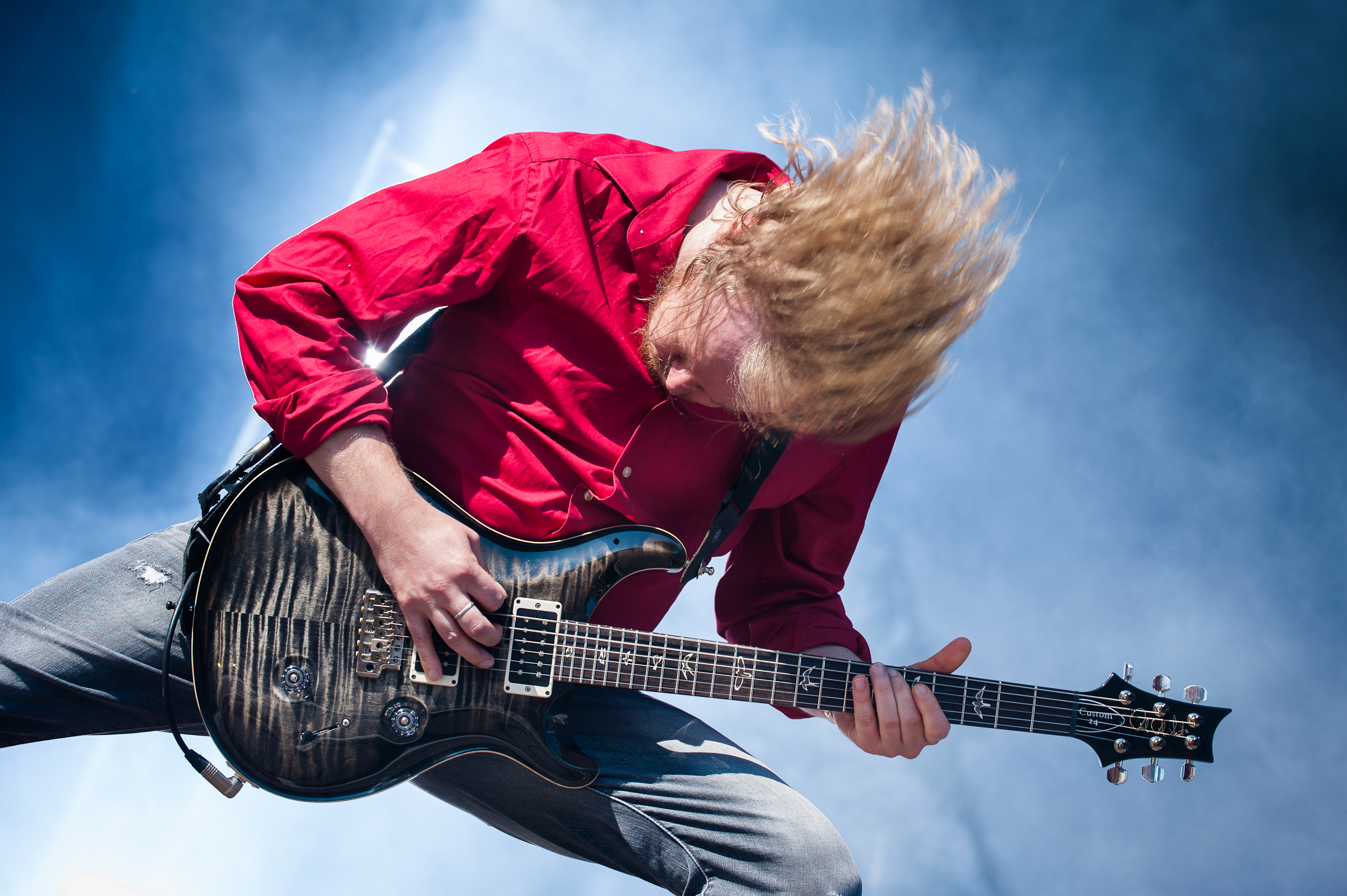
Guitarist Alexander Dietz joined the band in 2005, replacing guitarist Patrick Schleitzer.

After signing to Century Media in January 2004, Heaven Shall Burn's label debut, Antigone, was released on 26 April. The LP version was released through Lifeforce. Shortly after the release of Antigone, Heaven Shall Burn filmed a music video for the song "The Weapon They Fear". Antigone was further promoted during a headlining tour through Europe, supported by Maroon. On this tour, they appeared at the hardcore punk festival Fluff Fest for the third and final time.

After the 2004 Indian Ocean tsunami, Heaven Shall Burn teamed up with Napalm Death and the Haunted and released the split single Tsunami Benefit to raise money for charity. The single was limited to 1,000 hand-numbered copies and sold on two exclusive Napalm Death shows.

In March 2005, Heaven Shall Burn appeared at the Independence D Festival in Japan. In summer 2005, Heaven Shall Burn and Caliban's second split album, The Split Program II, was released through Lifeforce Records. Shortly after the Hell on Earth Tour 2005, Heaven Shall Burn announced that guitarist Patrick Schleitzer was leaving the band and Alexander Dietz, who played the guitar during the Hell on Earth Tour, would be the new guitarist. Heaven Shall Burn played a farewell show with Schleitzer in Saalfeld.

Following a quiet period, Heaven Shall Burn announced they had recorded the album Deaf to Our Prayers, released on 28 August 2006. After the release of "Counterweight", as the first track of the new album, Deaf to Our Prayers entered the German album charts at #65, the first Heaven Shall Burn album to enter record sales charts. During Summer 2006, Heaven Shall Burn played shows at Summer Breeze Open Air and other festivals. Live footage, recorded at Summer Breeze was later used in the "Counterweight" music video. In September and October, they headlined the Hell on Earth Tour 2006 on the European mainland; also part of the tour were Cataract, Maroon, and God Forbid. At the end of the year, they co-headlined a tour with Caliban through Germany and Belgium.

=== Iconoclast trilogy (2007–2012) ===
A re-mixed version of Whatever It May Take was released in 2007, featuring a different song order and acoustic track "io". For the summer shows, they hired live drummer Christian Bass. In August, Heaven Shall Burn announced they had begun recording a new album. In October, the album Iconoclast was announced, with release dates in early 2008. Heaven Shall Burn finished 2007 participating in the Darkness Over X-Mas Tour, co-headlining with Caliban, with support of Sonic Syndicate, Misery Speaks and the Sorrow. "Endzeit", the first song released of Iconoclast, was premiered live on that tour.

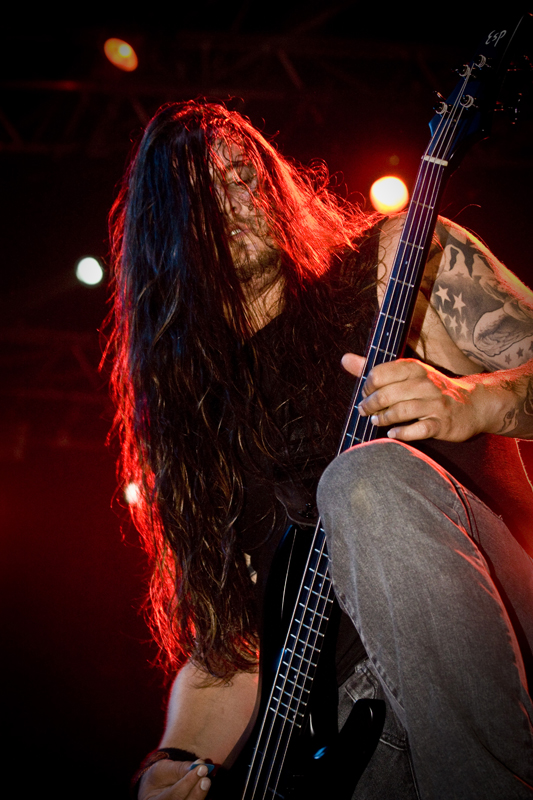
Bassist Eric Bischoff performing at Resurrection Fest 2010

After its release, Iconoclast entered the German album charts at #21, Heaven Shall Burn's best charting position to that date. A music video was released for "Endzeit". Shortly after a couple release shows in Germany and Greece, Heaven Shall Burn toured in support of Iconoclast. Aborted and Misery Speaks joined the first European leg of the tour. The second leg was Heaven Shall Burn's first North American tour with support of Embrace the End and the Ghost Inside. The North American leg was a brief tour across the US and Canada winding up at the New England Metal and Hardcore Festival. Following their North American tour, Heaven Shall Burn played several summer festival across Europe. In Vienna, Heaven Shall Burn played a 10th-anniversary show. The show was recorded for a future DVD.

The recording of the Vienna show was released as part of Iconoclast II -Bildersturm (The Visual Resistance)- in 2009. With its release, a music video for Heaven Shall Burn's Edge of Sanity cover of "Black Tears" came along. In May, Heaven Shall Burn supported Trivium on their Australian tour. Again in summer, Heaven Shall Burn appeared on festivals across Europe including Wacken Open Air. In early December, Heaven Shall Burn were special guests on the Taste of Chaos 2009 tour dates in Germany, headlined by In Flames and Killswitch Engage. Later in December, Heaven Shall Burn embarked the Darkness Over X-Mas Tour with support of Dark Tranquillity, Swashbuckle, and Deadlock.

The third part of the Iconoclast trilogy, Invictus (Iconoclast III), was released in May 2010 and became the band's and Century Media's first release to enter the top ten of the German Album Charts, at #9. To promote Invictus, Heaven Shall Burn co-headlined a European tour with As I Lay Dying in November 2010, with support of Suicide Silence and Dew-Scented. In May 2011, Heaven Shall Burn toured South America with As I Lay Dying.

In early 2012, Heaven Shall Burn were part of the Australian Soundwave Festival and played shows in South-East Asia. After that, they were part of the Impericon Progression Tour. The tour line-up included Unearth, Neaera and Suffokate on the European mainland and Rise to Remain, Malefice and Adept in the UK. After numerous festival shows, including a headlining show at With Full Force, Heaven Shall Burn and Caliban celebrated both band's 15th anniversary. Heaven Shall Burn celebrated their 15th anniversary playing their 500th show on 21 December 2012 in the sold out Klubhaus in their Saalfeld hometown.

=== Veto (2013–2015) ===
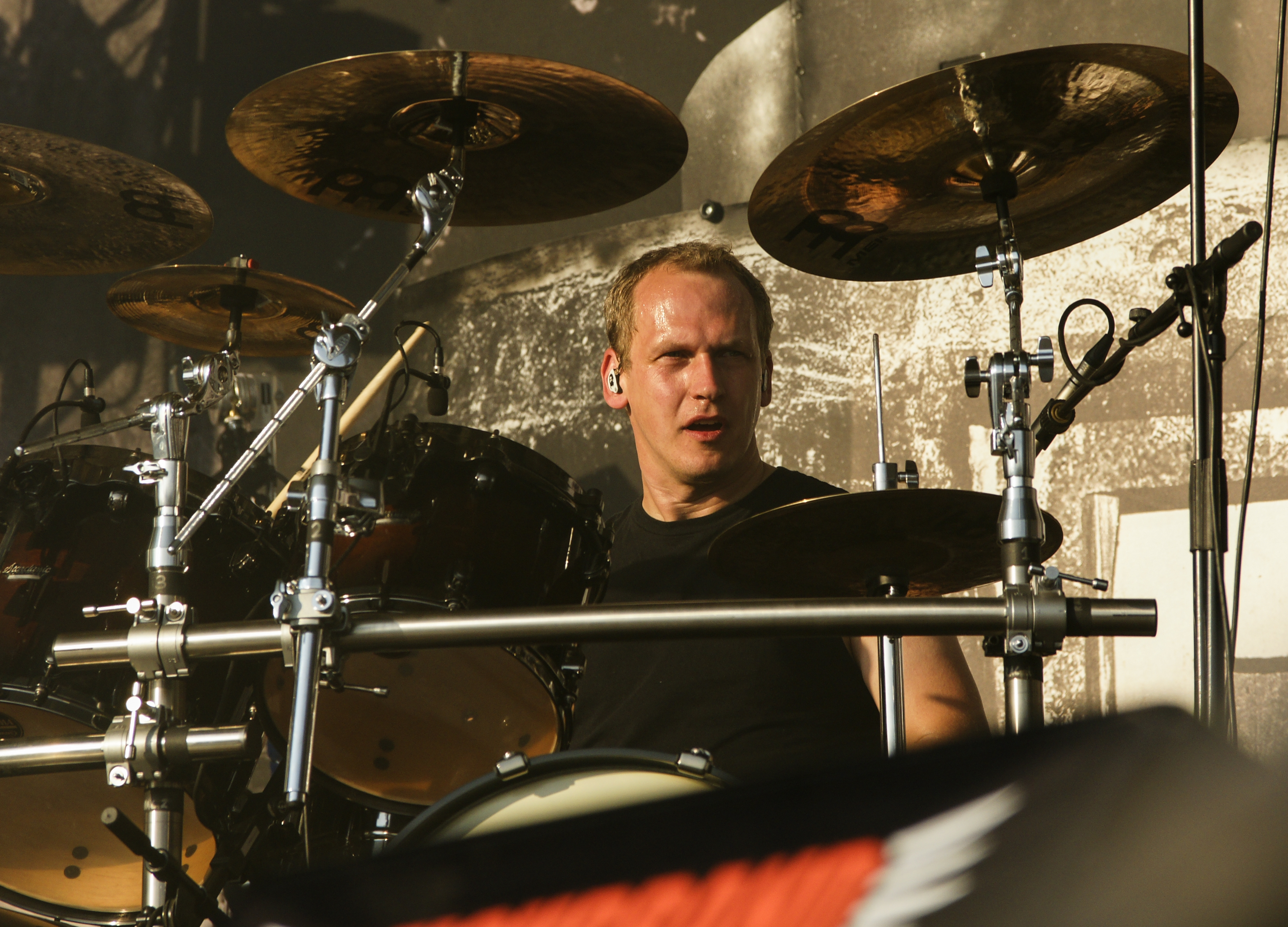
Drummer Christian Bass replaced Matthias Voigt in 2013.

In January 2013, Heaven Shall Burn announced they had finished writing their next album and were about to start recording it. On 20 February, they revealed the album Veto, released 19 April, in Germany and 30 April, in North America. To promote the album's release, a music video was shot for "Hunters Will Be Hunted" and a lyric video was made for "Godiva". They celebrated the release of the album with shows at the Impericon Festivals in Leipzig and Vienna and the Loudfest in Zurich. Veto entered the official German Album Charts at #2. Heaven Shall Burn appeared on some European Summer Festivals in 2013, among them were Graspop Metal Meeting and the first edition of Rock'n'Heim at the Hockenheimring. In support of Veto, Heaven Shall Burn headlined a European tour in November and December 2013; supporting acts were Hypocrisy, Dying Fetus and Bleed from Within. Before the tour, drummer Matthias Voigt announced that he was stepping down. Christian Bass replaced him.

In February 2014, Heaven Shall Burn toured South America with Parkway Drive. Heaven Shall Burn played several festivals across Europe in the Summer of 2014, including Rock am Ring and Rock im Park, Wacken Open Air, Deichbrand and Summer Breeze Open Air. Later the same year Heaven Shall Burn were special guests on Parkway Drive's European Tour 2014, along with Carnifex and Northlane. Parkway Drive co-headlined with Heaven Shall Burn in Germany, Austria and Switzerland.

On 30 April 2015, Heaven Shall Burn became the sponsor for the tricots of football team FC Carl Zeiss Jena. It is part of their campaign "Support Your Local Team" to encourage people to support local clubs. On 3 May, Jena first played in their new tricots.

Heaven Shall Burn appeared on various European festivals during summer 2015, including Greenfield Festival, With Full Force, Resurrection Fest and Brutal Assault.

=== Wanderer, Of Truth and Sacrifice and Heimat (2016–present) ===
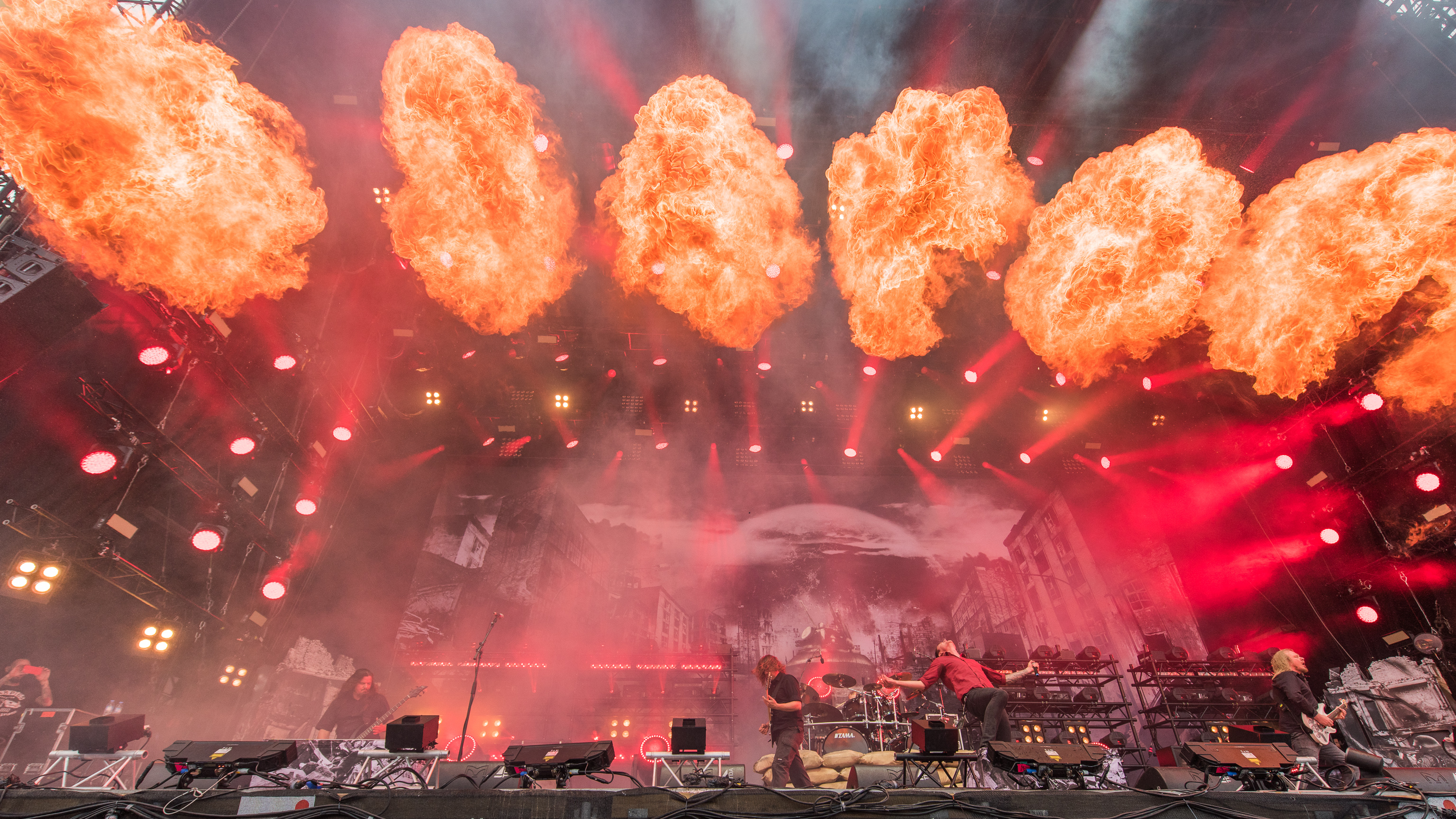
Heaven Shall Burn performing at Rock im Park 2016

On 16 September 2016, the band released their eighth studio album, Wanderer, available in a standard 12-track edition as well as a deluxe edition with a bonus track and a bonus disc (which contains covers included on previous albums). The first single released from the album was "Downshifter", followed by "Bring the War Home", which was released as a lyric video.

On 20 March 2020, the band released their ninth studio album, Of Truth and Sacrifice. It was released as a double album, available in the standard 2-CD as well as a deluxe edition with a bonus DVD, which contains the movie "Mein grünes Herz in dunklen Zeiten" (My green heart in dark times). The first single released from the album was the double release of "Protector" and "Weakness leaving my heart", which was released as a music video. It was followed by "My Heart and the Ocean", which was also released with a music video made in cooperation with Sea Shepherd. After touring in support of the album, the band went into the studio to record their tenth album. Titled Heimat, it is planned for release on 27 June 2025, followed by a short club tour to celebrate the release.

== Musical style ==
Heaven Shall Burn's musical style has been described as metalcore, melodic death metal and deathcore. Their lyrics often express heavy support for anti-racism and anti-fascism. They also have lyrics about resistance, oppression and animal rights. All members are vegans or vegetarians and most follow or followed a straight edge lifestyle.

== Band name ==
Heaven Shall Burn's name was inspired by an album by the black metal band Marduk, which is entitled Heaven Shall Burn... When We Are Gathered.

It's not that we're huge Marduk fans, but we liked the name. It sounds a bit provoking and so people ask us again and again for the meaning behind our name. [..] We use the term "heaven" as a metaphor for some kind of a fake paradise that people create in their heads. Some people close their eyes and don't see the truth surrounding them. So this kind of fake heaven should burn. Some people might think that our name is an anti-religious statement, but it isn't.

— Original drummer, Matthias Voigt

== Band members ==
Current

- Maik Weichert – guitars (1995–present)
- Marcus Bischoff – vocals (1998–present)
- Eric Bischoff – bass (1998–present)
- Alexander Dietz – guitars (2005–present)
- Christian Bass – drums (2013–present; touring 2006, 2007, 2010, 2011, 2012, 2013)

Former

- Michael Hartmann – guitars (1995–1999)
- Patrick Schleitzer – guitars (1998–2005)
- Matthias Voigt – drums (1995–2013)

Session

- Daniel Wilding – drums (Veto session)

== Discography ==
Studio albums

- Asunder (2000)
- Whatever It May Take (2002)
- Antigone (2004)
- Deaf to Our Prayers (2006)
- Iconoclast (2008)
- Invictus (Iconoclast III) (2010)
- Veto (2013)
- Wanderer (2016)
- Of Truth and Sacrifice (2020)
- Heimat (2025)
