= Ólafur Arnalds =

Icelandic musician and composer (born 1986)

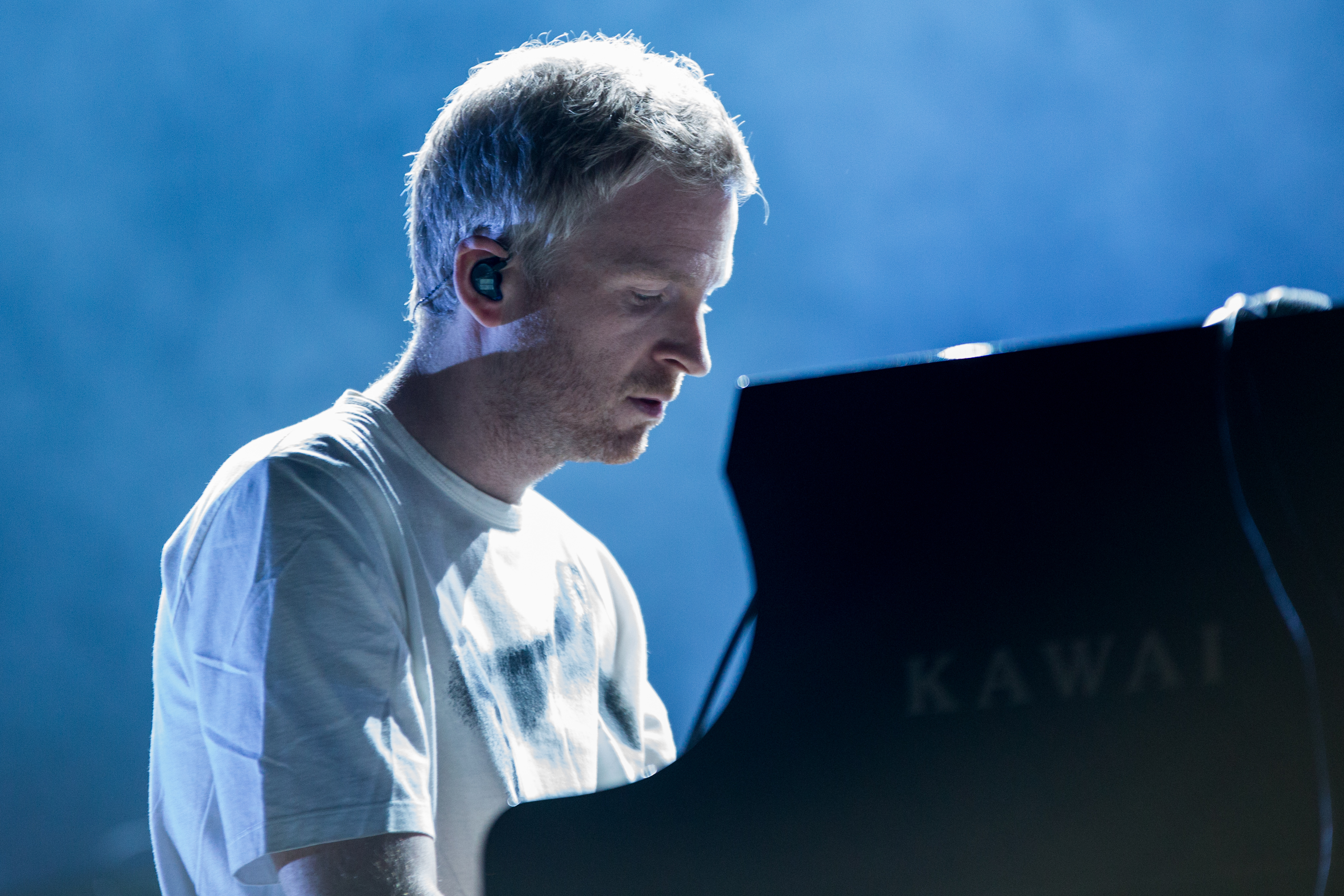
- Ólafur Arnalds in 2019

Background information
- Born: 3 December 1986 (age 39); Mosfellsbær, Iceland
- Genres: Film score; classical; experimental; electronica; ambient; hardcore punk (early); heavy metal (early)
- Occupations: Musician; composer; record producer
- Instruments: Piano; drums; guitar; banjo
- Years active: Early 2000s–present
- Labels: Erased Tapes; Mercury KX/Decca/Universal Classics
- Member of: Kiasmos
- Website: olafurarnalds.com

Ólafur Arnalds (Icelandic pronunciation: [ˈouːlavʏr ˈartnalts]; born 3 November 1986) is an Icelandic multi-instrumentalist and producer from Mosfellsbær, Iceland. He mixes strings and piano with loops and beats, a sound ranging from ambient/electronic to atmospheric pop. He is also the former drummer for hardcore punk and metal bands Fighting Shit, Celestine, and others.

In 2009, Ólafur also formed an experimental techno project, entitled Kiasmos, with Janus Rasmussen from the Icelandic electro-pop band Bloodgroup, announcing his electronic debut album in 2014.

In 2013, Ólafur composed the score for the 2013 ITV series Broadchurch, for which he won the 2014 BAFTA TV Craft Award for Best Original Music.

In 2020, Ólafur was nominated for a Primetime Emmy Award for Outstanding Original Main Title Theme Music, for his title theme to Apple TV+ series Defending Jacob.

In 2021, he was nominated in two categories at the 64th Annual Grammy Awards. "Loom (feat. Bonobo)" was nominated in the Best Dance/Electronic Recording category and "The Bottom Line" was nominated in the Best Arrangement, Instrumental and Vocals category. Both songs appear on his fifth studio album Some Kind of Peace (2020).

Since late 2025, Ólafur has hosted a radio programme on the digital-only UK station BBC Radio 3 Unwind at least once a week titled Ultimate Calm, which is normally broadcast between 21 and 22 o'clock.

== History ==
=== 1986–2007: Early life and career beginnings ===
Ólafur's grandmother introduced him to the music of Frédéric Chopin from an early age.

In 2004, Ólafur composed and recorded the intro and two outros for tracks on the album Antigone by German metal band Heaven Shall Burn. On his Facebook page, he described how he got to know them: "I was playing drums in a hardcore band and we were supporting the German metal band Heaven Shall Burn on their Icelandic tour. Being a huge fan, I gave them a demo with some very overly dramatic prog-rock songs I had been making at home – it was not so classic like this but had some badly computerized strings and piano in it. A few months later they contacted me asked if I would write some intros and outros for their new album, but only with the piano/strings elements – So I wrote my first classical pieces. Their album was a big success in Europe and a few months later I got a phone call from a label asking 'would you be interested in making a full album with compositions like this?' I hadn't really considered continuing writing music like this, but said yes."

=== 2007–2008: Eulogy for Evolution and Variations of Static ===
On 12 October 2007, Ólafur's first solo album Eulogy for Evolution was released. It was followed by the EP Variations of Static in 2008. In the same year, Ólafur toured with Sigur Rós and his second collaboration with Heaven Shall Burn, the album Iconoclast (Part 1: The Final Resistance), was released. He is also reported to have sold out The Barbican Hall in London.

=== 2009: Found Songs and Dyad 1909 ===
In April 2009, Ólafur composed and released a track daily for seven days, instantly making each track available within 24 hours from foundsongs.erasedtapes.com. The collection of tracks was entitled Found Songs. The first track was released on 13 April.

In October 2009, the ballet Dyad 1909 premiered with a score composed by Ólafur which was also released as an EP.

Also in 2009, Ólafur formed an experimental techno project, Kiasmos, with Janus Rasmussen from the Icelandic electro-pop band Bloodgroup. They released a joint EP with Ryan Lee West of the EDM project Rival Consoles entitled 65/Milo.

=== 2010–2011: Second studio album and Living Room Songs ===
In April 2010, Ólafur released a new album entitled ...And They Have Escaped The Weight of Darkness. During 2010 Ólafur also went on a well-received Asian Tour organised by China-based promoter Split Works.

On 3 October 2011, Ólafur started another seven-day composition project similar to Found Songs, this one entitled Living Room Songs. Inspired one day by only having a laptop computer available to record the musical ideas he explored using only the video recording feature. Taken by the intimate feeling of the recording, he expanded on the approach for the Living Room Songs project.

Calling on string musician friends, they rehearsed and recorded one song each day for a week in his Reykjavik apartment, releasing the next day for free as streamed videos and mp3 downloads. The project was released as an album on 23 December 2011 and a corresponding short film, offered a rare glimpse into Ólafur's creative process and the close-knit musical community he is a part of.

2011 also saw the release of Ólafur's remix of Mr Fogg's track "Keep Your Teeth Sharp" on the EP of the same name.

=== 2012: Another Happy Day, Two Songs For Dance... ===
In 2012, Ólafur announced a new partnership with the Universal Music label Mercury Classics.

2012 saw four releases from Ólafur; his score for Sam Levinson's film Another Happy Day; an EP entitled Two Songs For Dance; the second EP from his experimental techno project Kiasmos and another EP entitled Stare with German pianist Nils Frahm.

Also in 2012, his song "Allt varð hljótt" was used in the score and the soundtrack for the film The Hunger Games.

"Til enda" was used in a trailer for the 2012 film Looper.

=== 2013–2014: For Now I Am Winter and further scores ===
Ólafur released his third studio album entitled For Now I Am Winter in February 2013. Four tracks featured vocals from Arnór Dan of the Icelandic band Agent Fresco. This was the first time Ólafur incorporated vocals into any of his released work.

More recently, he composed the score and end-credits track for the 2013 ITV series Broadchurch (again featuring the vocals of Arnór Dan), for which he won the 2014 BAFTA TV Craft Award for Best Original Music.

Ólafur also composed the score for Ron Krauss' film Gimme Shelter.

For Now I Am Winter was used in the pilot of the 2013 US TV show Masters of Sex.

Ólafur Arnalds has been involved with various other projects and his music appears in many films, television shows and advertisements. His songs have been featured on So You Think You Can Dance in multiple seasons. He also spoke at length on the subject of fan-submitted art in the 2011 documentary film Press Pause Play.

In 2014 Ólafur announced his electronic debut album in collaboration with Janus Rasmussen under his project Kiasmos.

=== 2015: The Chopin Project and further projects ===
In 2015 Ólafur collaborated with German-Japanese pianist Alice Sara Ott on The Chopin Project, which was a release to introduce an exciting new take on the music of Frédéric Chopin. Arnalds chose a program of Chopin works to create an emotional arc throughout the album and then composed linking sections for string quintet, piano, and synthesizer based on the atmosphere and motifs of those pieces.

The Chopin Project began as a dedication to Ólafur's grandmother, in some respects. Out of respect for her, a younger, metal-loving Ólafur would sit with her to listen to Chopin's work whenever they had visited one another. At her deathbed, Ólafur said “she was just lying there, old and sick, but very happy and proud. And I sat with her and we listened to a Chopin sonata. Then I kissed her goodbye and left. She passed away a few hours later.”

In 2015, Ólafur's collaborations with Nils Frahm, Life Story Love and Glory (a completely improvised recording) and Loon, were collected on a double CD entitled Collaborative Works along with 2012's Stare and a live improvisational film entitled Trance Frendz - An evening with Ólafur Arnalds and Nils Frahm. 2015 also saw the full release of his work on Broadchurch.

=== 2016: Island Songs ===
In June 2016 Ólafur announced his Island Songs project, which would involve him working with director Baldvin Z and travelling to seven different locations in Iceland over seven weeks, collaborating with seven different artists. Each week the audio and video for each track would be released, culminating in the final track, "Doria", being released on 8 August 2016.

List of tracks with collaborators:

1. "Árbakkinn" (ft. Einar Georg)
2. "1995" (ft. Dagný Arnalds)
3. "Raddir" (ft. South Iceland Chamber Choir)
4. "Öldurót" (ft. Atli Örvarsson & SinfoniaNord)
5. "Dalur" (ft. Brasstríó Mosfellsdals)
6. "Particles" (ft. Nanna Bryndís from Of Monsters and Men)
7. "Doria"

"Particles" ft. Nanna Bryndís from Of Monsters and Men was premiered on Zane Lowe's Beats 1 show on 1 August 2016, making it the first classical track featured on that station.

In 2016, Ólafur and Quarashi frontman Sölvi Blöndal founded the record label Alda Music, which was acquired by INgrooves in January 2022. Alda owned the rights to nearly 80 percent of all music released in Iceland.

=== 2018: Re:member ===
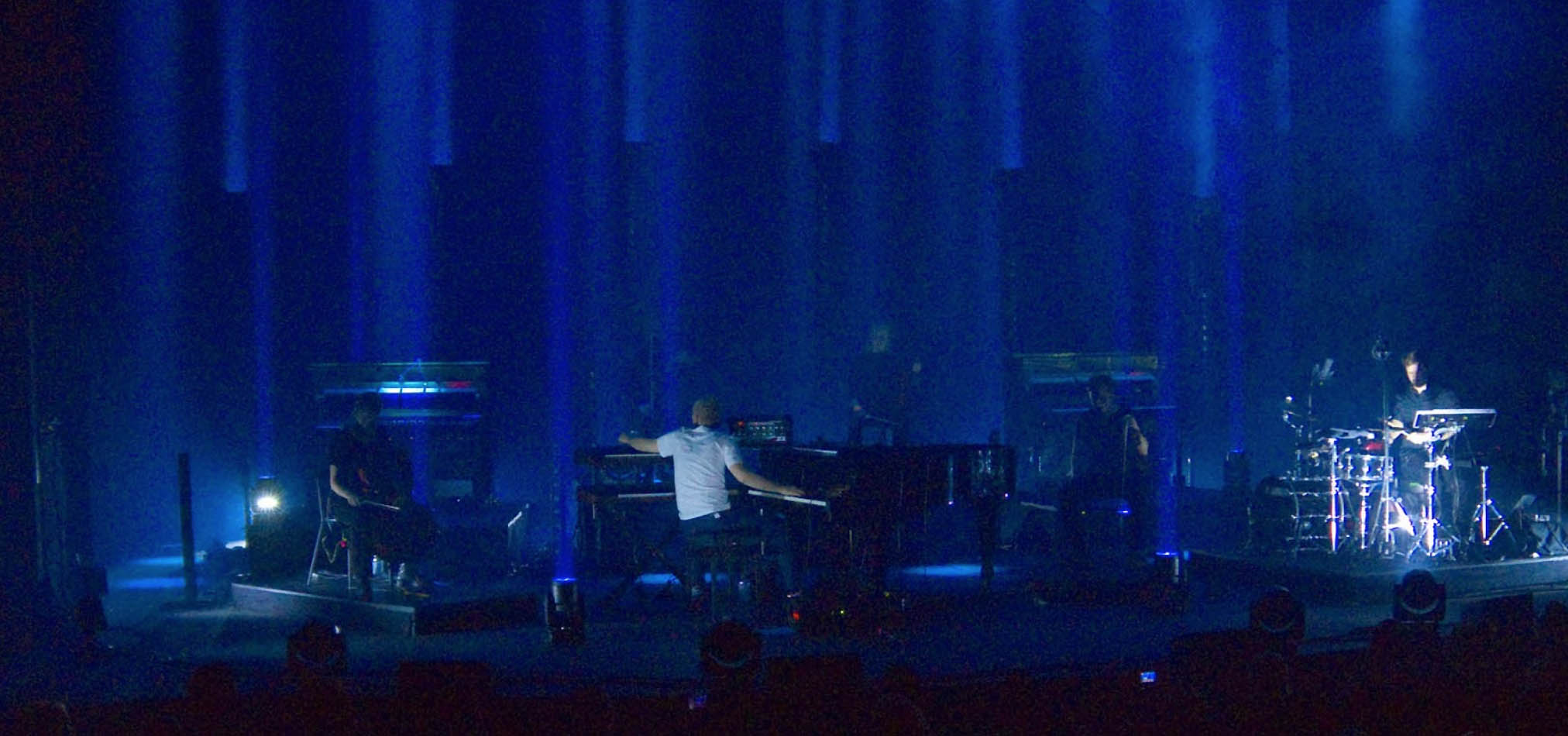
With Stratus Pianos at Iceland Airwaves, 2018

Ólafur's fourth official solo album, Re:member was released in August 2018. The album featured his new musical system called Stratus. The Stratus Pianos are two self-playing, semi-generative player pianos which are triggered by a central piano played by Arnalds. The custom-built software was born out of two years of work by the composer and audio developer, Halldór Eldjárn. As Arnalds plays a note on the piano, two different notes are generated by Stratus, creating unexpected harmonies and surprising melodic sequences.

The algorithms generated from Stratus were also used to create the album artwork. In an interview with Sound of Boston, Arnalds explains that the artist, Torsten Posselt from FELD studios, used the Stratus software as a starting point and made his own software that translated the same MIDI signals used for the music. Each dot corresponds to a piano note in the title track: 88 fields correspond to 88 notes; the thicker the dot, the higher the frequency of that note being played.

He composed the main theme for the Apple TV+ mini series Defending Jacob (miniseries).

=== 2020: Some Kind of Peace ===
His fifth studio album, Some Kind of Peace, was released on 6 November 2020. The album features guest appearances from Bonobo, Josin, and JFDR. "Loom" (feat. Bonobo) and "The Bottom Line" were nominated for Grammy Awards.

=== 2023: OPIA Community ===
In October 2023, Ólafur officially launched the OPIA Community project, which is described as a "travelling festival series, a record label and a community hub made up of creators, thinkers, art lovers and everything in-between." The project had been in preparation since 2019, however was delayed by the COVID-19 pandemic.

On 18 October 2023, Ólafur hosted the official OPIA Community launch event titled 'OPIA Night' at Silent Green in Berlin, Germany. The event featured several artists who Ólafur met online during the pandemic and have since been signed to the OPIA Community record label, including JFDR and Sofi Paez.

== Personal life ==
Ólafur's cousin Ólöf Arnalds is also a well-known singer-songwriter.

Ólafur is a vegetarian.

Ólafur's favourite classical composers are Frédéric Chopin, David Lang, Shostakovich and Arvo Pärt.

Ólafur lives in Iceland but also has a home in Indonesia.

Ólafur married his partner, singer and musician Sandrayati, in Bali in December 2022. On 5 September 2025, he announced she is 37 weeks pregnant with their first child.

== Notable awards and nominations ==
=== Awards ===
- BAFTA awards (2014), Best Original Music, for Broadchurch
- Televisual Bulldog Awards (2014), Best Music, for Broadchurch
- The Edda Icelandic Film Awards (2015), Best music, for Vonarstræti
- Icelandic Music Awards (2021), Best Film and TV Score, for Defending Jacob

=== Notable nominations ===
- Emmy Awards (2020), Outstanding Original Main Title Theme Music, for Defending Jacob
- Grammy Awards (2022), Best Arrangement, Instruments and Vocals, for "The Bottom Line"
- Grammy Awards (2022), Best Dance/Electronic Recording, for "Loom (feat. Bonobo)"

== Discography ==
=== Albums ===
- Eulogy for Evolution (2007)
- ...And They Have Escaped the Weight of Darkness (2010)
- For Now I Am Winter (2013)
- Re:member (2018)
- Some Kind of Peace (2020)
- A Dawning (2025)

=== Extended plays ===
- Variations of Static - EP (2008)
- The Invisible EP - EP (2021)

=== Singles ===
- "Two Songs for Dance" (2012)
- "Kinesthesia I" (2016)
- "RGB" (2016)
- "Zeit" (2021) (rework for Rammstein)
- "Saudade" (2021)
- "Improvisation" (2024)

=== Collections ===
- Found Songs (2009)
- Living Room Songs (2011)
- Island Songs (2016)
- like gravity (2026)

=== Soundtracks ===
- Dyad 1909 (2009)
- Blinky TM (2010)
- Jitters (2010)
- Another Happy Day (2012)
- Gimme Shelter (2013)
- Vonarstræti/Life in a Fishbowl (2014)
- The Invisible Front (2014)
- Broadchurch (2015)
- Philip K. Dick's Electric Dreams - Episode 1 (2017)
- Defending Jacob (2020)
- Surface (2022)
- Moonhaven (2022)
- Deep rising (2023)

=== Collaborations ===
- A Hundred Reasons - Single (2010) with Haukur Heiðar Hauksson (lead singer of Dikta)
- Stare - EP (2012) with Nils Frahm
- The Chopin Project - LP (2015) with Alice Sara Ott
- Life Story / Love and Glory - Single (2015) with Nils Frahm
- Loon - EP (2015) with Nils Frahm
- Trance Frendz - LP (2016) with Nils Frahm
- Say My Name - Single (2016) with Arnór Dan
- Patience - Single (2019) with Rhye
- Oceans - Single (2020) with RY X
- Colorblind - Single (2022) with RY X
- Light of Day - Single (2022) with Odesza
- Forever Held - Single (2024) with Jon Hopkins
- SAGES - EP (2025) with Loreen as SAGES
- A Dawning - LP (2025) with Talos

=== Mixtapes ===
- Late Night Tales: Ólafur Arnalds (2016)

=== Charting Albums ===
Year	Title	Swedish Classical Albums	Irish Albums Chart	UK Albums Chart
2018	"The Chopin Project"	5	-	-
2018	"Re:Member"	1	-	48
2018	"Island Songs"	2	-	-
2020	"Some Kind of Peace"	1	-	53
2024	"Some Kind of Peace - Piano Reworks"	7	-	-
2025	"A Dawning"	1	15	-

== See also ==
- List of ambient music artists
