= Iconoclast (Heaven Shall Burn album) =

Studio album by Heaven Shall Burn
- Released: January 28, 2008
- Studios: Rape of Harmonies Studios, Germany
- Genres: Metalcore, melodic death metal
- Length: 58:09
- Label: Century Media
- Producers: Alexander Dietz, Maik Weichert

Heaven Shall Burn chronology
Deaf to Our Prayers (2006)	Iconoclast (2008)	Invictus (Iconoclast III) (2010)

Professional ratings
Review scores
Source	Rating
About.com	3.5/5 stars
AllMusic	3/5 stars
Rock Hard	9.0/10
Sputnikmusic	4.0/5

Iconoclast is the fifth studio album by German melodic death metal band Heaven Shall Burn. The album was released in Europe on 28 January 2008, followed by an American release on 5 February 2008; both dates through Century Media Records. A concept album, it represents the first part of the iconoclast trilogy, followed by the live CD/DVD Iconoclast II -Bildersturm (The Visual Resistance)- in 2009 and the studio album Invictus (Iconoclast III) in 2010.

The album entered the German Media Control chart at No. 21. The 2nd track, "Endzeit" means "final days" or "end time" in German.

== Track listing ==
No.	Title	Writer(s)	Length
1.	"Awoken (Intro)"	Ólafur Arnalds	1:29
2.	"Endzeit"		4:18
3.	"Like a Thousand Suns"		3:46
4.	"Murderers of all Murderers"		3:55
5.	"Forlorn Skies"		4:51
6.	"A Dying Ember"		6:57
7.	"Joel"		5:03
8.	"A Quest for Resistance"		4:51
9.	"Black Tears" (Edge of Sanity cover)	Dan Swanö	3:06
10.	"The Bombs of My Saviours"		4:22
11.	"Against All Lies"		5:08
12.	"The Disease"		2:46
13.	"Equinox"	Arnalds	3:10
14.	"Atonement" (Instrumental)		4:35
Total length:			58:09

Japanese Bonus Tracks
No.	Title	Length
15.	"No One Will Shed a Tear"	4:41
16.	"Downfall of Christ" (Merauder cover)	3:10
Total length:		66:00

Live at: Wacken Open Air 2007
No.	Title	Length
1.	"Echoes" (Intro)	1:26
2.	"The Weapon They Fear"	3:50
3.	"The Only Truth"	4:27
4.	"Counterweight"	4:52
5.	"Profane Believers"	4:38
6.	"The Seventh Cross"	5:22
7.	"Voice of the Voiceless"	6:08
8.	"Behind a Wall of Silence"	5:20
9.	"mybestfriends.com"	5:05
10.	"No One Will Shed a Tear"	5:06
11.	"Counterweight" (musicvideo)	4:30
Total length:		50:44

== Personnel ==
Production and performance credits are adapted from the album liner notes.

Heaven Shall Burn

- Marcus Bischoff – vocals
- Alexander Dietz – guitars, synthesizer, piano, producer
- Maik Weichert – guitars, producer
- Eric Bischoff – bass
- Matthias Voigt – drums

Production

- Tue Madsen – mixing, mastering
- Patrick W. Engel – co-producer
- Ralf Müller – co-producer
- Bastian "BastiBasti" Sobtzick (Callejon) – artwork, layout
- Ólafur Arnalds – arrangement, recording, producer, mixing on "Awoken" and "Equinox"

Additional musicians

- Patrick W. Engel – additional vocals on "Endzeit", additional guitar, bass
- Ólafur Arnalds – piano on "Awoken" and "Equinox"
- Margrét Soffia Einarsdóttir – violin on "Awoken" and "Equinox"
- Una Pétursdóffir – violin on "Awoken" and "Equinox"
- Arndis Hulda Audunsdóffir – viola on "Awoken" and "Equinox"
- Thordur Gudmundur Herrmannson – cello on "Awoken" and "Equinox"

== Chart performance ==
Chart (2008)	Peak position
Austrian Albums (Ö3 Austria)	65
German Albums (Offizielle Top 100)	21
Swiss Albums (Schweizer Hitparade)	97
US Heatseekers Albums (Billboard)	30
