= Whatever It May Take =

Studio album by Heaven Shall Burn
- Released: 10 December 2001
- Recorded: October 2001
- Studios: Rape of Harmonies Studios, Germany
- Genres: Melodic death metal; death metal; metalcore
- Length: 48:24
- Label: Lifeforce
- Producer: Patrick W. Engel

Heaven Shall Burn chronology
Asunder (2000)	Whatever It May Take (2001)	Antigone (2004)

Alternative cover
- Cover of the 2007 Re-Release

Professional ratings
Review scores
Source	Rating
AllMusic	4.5/5 stars
Rock Hard	8.0/10
Sputnikmusic	5/5

Whatever It May Take is the second studio album by German melodic death metal band Heaven Shall Burn, released via Lifeforce Records in 2001. Initially planned for a December 3 release, the digipacks were destroyed in an accident on the way to the pressing plant, postponing the release date to December 10, 2001. A limited vinyl variant was released in February 2002, but due to a mistake by the pressing plant, the label only received 870 of 1000 copies, 200 of them on coloured vinyl. The album also received a South American release via Liberation Records, with an additional intro and the bonus track "Pass Away".

== Track listing ==
All lyrics are written by Maik Weichert.

No.	Title	Length
1.	"Behind a Wall of Silence"	3:42
2.	"The Worlds in Me"	4:22
3.	"The Martyrs' Blood"	4:16
4.	"It Burns Within"	4:29
5.	"Implore the Darken Sky"	5:08
6.	"The Few Upright"	2:16
7.	"Whatever It May Take"	3:44
8.	"Ecowar"	3:22
9.	"Naked Among Wolves"	4:16
10.	"The Fire"	4:12
11.	"Casa de Caboclo" (Point of No Return cover)	2:46
12.	"Implore the Darken Sky" (Classic version)	5:08
Total length:		47:35

South American Version
No.	Title	Length
1.	"Intro"	0:49
14.	"Pass Away"

2007 Re-Release
No.	Title	Length
1.	"The Few Upright"	2:17
2.	"Behind a Wall of Silence"	3:41
3.	"The Fire"	4:11
4.	"Naked Among Wolves"	4:17
5.	"The Martyr's Blood"	4:15
6.	"The Worlds in Me"	4:20
7.	"Implore the Darken Sky"	5:07
8.	"Ecowar"	2:59
9.	"It Burns Within"	4:28
10.	"Whatever It May Take"	3:44
11.	"io"	2:01
12.	"Casa de Caboclo" (Point of No Return cover)	2:47
13.	"Implore the Darken Sky" (Classic version)	5:07
Total length:		49:14

Notes

- On the South American version, "Intro" and "Pass Away" are added as bonus tracks 1 and 14, respectively. Additionally, "Casa da Caboclo" is moved to track 3.
- "Intro" is also present on the vinyl variant and on some of the CD's repressings.
- On the re-release, "The Martyrs' Blood" is written as "The Martyr's Blood".

== Personnel ==
Production and performance credits are adapted from the album liner notes.

Heaven Shall Burn

- Marcus Bischoff – lead vocals
- Patrick Schleitzer – guitars
- Maik Weichert – guitars
- Eric Bischoff – bass
- Matthias Voigt – drums

Production

- Patrick W. Engel – recording, mixing, mastering, bass
- alv3n.com – layout

Additional musicians

- Johannes Formella (The Destiny Program) – additional vocals on "Casa de Caboclo"
- André Moraweck (Maroon) – additional vocals on "Casa de Caboclo"
