= Heimat (album) =

Studio album by Heaven Shall Burn
- Released: 27 June 2025
- Studio: The Dude Ranch; Pilgrim Church (Rannstedt); Synchron Stage (Vienna)
- Genre: Melodic death metal; metalcore
- Length: 51:12
- Label: Century Media
- Producer: Alexander Dietz

Heaven Shall Burn chronology
| Of Truth and Sacrifice (2020) | Heimat (2025) |

Singles from Heimat
- 1. "My Revocation of Compliance" Released: 10 April 2025; 2. "Confounder" Released: 30 April 2025; 3. "Empowerment" Released: 20 May 2025; 4. "Numbered Days" Released: 11 June 2025; 5. "War Is the Father of All" Released: 26 June 2025

Heimat (German for "home") is the tenth studio album by German extreme metal band Heaven Shall Burn. It was released on 27 June 2025 through Century Media Records. The album marks the band's first release in five years since Of Truth and Sacrifice (2020).

== Background and themes ==
Heimat was announced on 9 April 2025, revealing the album's title, release date, and cover art. The album was recorded at the band's own studio, The Dude Ranch, operated by guitarist Alexander Dietz. Mixing and mastering were handled by Danish producer Tue Madsen. Heaven Shall Burn enlisted artist Eliran Kantor to design the artwork, which depicts a triptych featuring a rebelling deer.

Guitarist Maik Weichert explained the album title, stating that it is not meant to be understood in a "bigoted way" but rather as a "gateway for observations and perspectives". The album explores a broader understanding of "home", encompassing both the origins of different people and the idea of a "spiritual home". "A Whisper From Above" is dedicated to Irene Gut Opdyke in the album's booklet. "Ten Days in May" is about the Coup d'état of May Seventeenth, 1980 in South Korea and the citizen's uprising against the military dictatorship in the following nine days.

== Singles ==
The lead single, "My Revocation of Compliance", was released on 10 April 2025, having been previously teased through a poem by German writer Theodor Storm. "Confounder", the second single, was released on 30 April and serves as a plea for solidarity and mutual support.

== Track listing ==
All tracks are written by Heaven Shall Burn, except "Numbered Days" (written by Mike D'Antonio, Joel Stroetzel, Adam Dutkiewicz, and Jesse Leach).

Heimat track listing
| No. | Title | Length |
|---|---|---|
| 1. | "Ad Arma" | 1:54 |
| 2. | "War Is the Father of All" | 6:42 |
| 3. | "My Revocation of Compliance" | 3:33 |
| 4. | "Confounder" | 4:21 |
| 5. | "Empowerment" | 4:45 |
| 6. | "A Whisper from Above" | 4:27 |
| 7. | "Imminence" | 1:04 |
| 8. | "Those Left Behind" | 3:24 |
| 9. | "Ten Days in May" | 4:37 |
| 10. | "Numbered Days" (Killswitch Engage cover; featuring Jesse Leach) | 3:39 |
| 11. | "Dora" | 4:12 |
| 12. | "A Silent Guard" | 5:00 |
| 13. | "Inter Arma" | 3:24 |
| Total length: | | 51:12 |

Keinen Schritt zurück
| No. | Title | Length |
|---|---|---|
| 14. | "Keinen Schritt zurück" | 4:36 |
| 15. | "Schweineherbst" | 3:16 |
| 16. | "Eisenkopf" | 3:50 |
| 17. | "Destroy Fascism" | 1:58 |
| Total length: | | 13:40 |

=== Note ===
- "Numbered Days" is a cover of the Killswitch Engage song from Alive or Just Breathing (2002).

== Personnel ==
Credits adapted from the album's liner notes.

=== Heaven Shall Burn ===
- Marcus Bischoff – vocals
- Alexander Dietz – guitar, production, engineering, recording, strings recording
- Maik Weichert – guitar, co-production
- Eric Bischoff – bass
- Christian Bass – drums

=== Additional contributors ===
- Tue Madsen – mixing, mastering
- Eliran Kantor – artwork painting
- Candy Welz – band photos
- Christian Thiele – nature photography
- Patrick Wittstock – layout, design
- Jesse Leach – guest vocals on "Numbered Days"
- Ken Susi – solo guitar on "Ten Days in May"
- Sven Helbig – string and choir arrangements, artistic direction
- Mondëna Quartet – strings
  - Shir-Ran Yinon – vioiln
  - Sofia Beno – violin
  - Marie Schutrak – viola
  - Franziska Ludwig – cello
- Sophia Chamber Choir – choral singing
  - Olena Grytsiuk – soprano
  - Yuliia Dunaieve – soprano
  - Ananstasiia Palii – soprano
  - Katerina Antonova – soprano
  - Olena Horiainova – alto
  - Sophia Turta – alto
  - Iryna Razin-Kravchenko – alto
  - Oleksii Shamrytskyi – alto
  - Vitalii Koval – tenor
  - Serhii Panasiuk – tenor
  - Makoto Fujimoto – tenor
  - Seungmo Jeong – tenor
  - Zacharis Galavic – bass
  - Oleksandr Kryvorotenko – bass
  - Oleksandr Boriiko – bass
  - Maksym Kozchenko – bass
- Wilhelm Keitel – choral conductor
- Lukas Lützow – score engineering
- Christoph Aigelsreiter – Pro Tools operation
- Cameron Masters – technical management, stage monitor mixing
- Astrid Höger – project coordination

== Charts ==
Chart performance for Heimat
| Chart (2025) | Peak position |
|---|---|
| Austrian Albums (Ö3 Austria) | 4 |
| Belgian Albums (Ultratop Flanders) | 153 |
| Belgian Albums (Ultratop Wallonia) | 132 |
| French Rock & Metal Albums (SNEP) | 37 |
| German Albums (Offizielle Top 100) | 2 |
| German Rock & Metal Albums | 2 |
| Swiss Albums (Schweizer Hitparade) | 15 |
