= Deaf to Our Prayers =

Studio album by Heaven Shall Burn
- Released: 28 August 2006
- Studio: Rape of Harmonies Studios, Germany
- Genre: Melodic death metal; metalcore
- Length: 47:47
- Label: Century Media
- Producer: Alexander Dietz, Maik Weichert

Heaven Shall Burn chronology
The Split Program II (2005)	Deaf to Our Prayers (2006)	Iconoclast (Part 1: The Final Resistance) (2008)

Professional ratings
Review scores
Source	Rating
About.com	3/5 stars
AllMusic	3.5/5 stars
Exclaim!	Favorable
Rock Hard	9.0/10

Deaf to Our Prayers is the fourth studio album by German melodic death metal band Heaven Shall Burn. The title was inspired by the famous poem "The Silesian Weavers" by German poet Heinrich Heine. The first video released for this album was of the song "Counterweight".

== Track listing ==
No.	Title	Length
1.	"Counterweight"	4:20
2.	"Trespassing the Shores of Your World"	5:18
3.	"Profane Believers"	3:36
4.	"Stay the Course"	3:56
5.	"The Final March"	4:06
6.	"Of No Avail"	4:57
7.	"Armia"	5:50
8.	"MyBestFriends.com"	4:52
9.	"Biogenesis (Undo Creation)"	3:54
10.	"Dying in Silence"	4:20
11.	"The Greatest Gift of God"	2:42
Total length:		47:47

Japanese Bonus Track
No.	Title	Length
12.	"True Belief" (Paradise Lost cover)	4:34
Total length:		52:21

Bonus DVD
No.	Title	Length
1.	"The Weapon They Fear" (Music Video)
2.	"The Weapon They Fear" (live)
3.	"Behind a Wall of Silence" (live)
4.	"The Only Truth" (live)
5.	"No One Will Shed a Tear" (live)
6.	"Voice of the Voiceless" (live)
7.	"The Seventh Cross" (live)
8.	"Bleeding to Death" (live)
9.	"To Harvest the Storm" (live)
10.	"Unleash Enlightment" (live)

== Personnel ==
Production and performance credits are adapted from the album liner notes.

Heaven Shall Burn

- Marcus Bischoff – vocals
- Maik Weichert – guitars
- Alexander Dietz – guitars
- Eric Bischoff – bass
- Matthias Voigt – drums

Production

- Maik Weichert – production
- Alexander Dietz – production
- Jacob Hansen – mixing, mastering
- Patrick W. Engel – co-producer, additional guitar and bass
- theterje.net – artwork, layout
- Axel Jusseit – band photo

Additional musicians

- Ralf Müller – synths, piano
- Revenge Falls – backing vocals on "The Greatest Gift of God"

== Charts ==
Chart performance for Deaf to Our Prayers
Chart (2022)	Peak position
German Albums (Offizielle Top 100)	22
