= Re:member (album) =

Studio album by Ólafur Arnalds
- Released: August 2018
- Genre: Classical; Downtempo; Electro; Experimental
- Label: Mercury KX/Decca/Universal Classcs

Ólafur Arnalds chronology
For Now I Am Winter (2013)	Re:member (2018)	Some Kind of Peace (2020)

Re:member is the fourth official solo album by Ólafur Arnalds released in August 2018. The album contains twelve tracks.

== Track listing ==
No.	Title	Length
1.	"Re:member"	6:09
2.	"Unfold"	3:58
3.	"Saman"	2:12
4.	"Brot"	2:54
5.	"Inconsist"	4:32
6.	"They Sink"	2:36
7.	"Ypsilon"	3:55
8.	"Partial"	3:16
9.	"Momentary"	2:05
10.	"Undir"	6:31
11.	"Ekki Hugsa"	4:42
12.	"Nyepi"	4:14
