= Point of No Return (band) =

Brazilian metalcore band

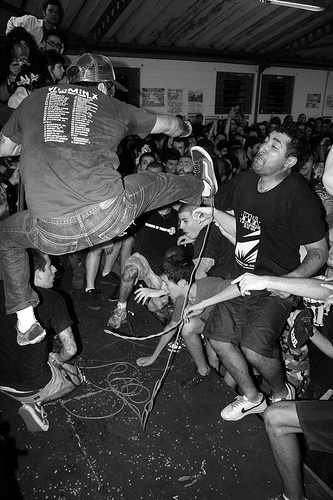

Background information
- Origin: São Paulo, Brazil
- Genre: Metalcore • heavy hardcore • hardcore punk
- Years active: 1996–2006, 2024–present
- Labels: Liberation, Catalyst, Scorched Earth Police, Refuse, Indecision
- Members: Alexandre Fanuchi; Frederico Freitas; Paulo Sangiorgio Jr.; Leonardo Cantinfras; Luciano Juliatto; Ruy Fernando
- Past members: Marcos Suarez; Tarcísio Leite; Jefferson Queiróz; Gilberto Gomes; Juninho do Brás; Luciano Valéiro

Point of No Return is a vegan, straight edge metalcore band from São Paulo, Brazil.

== History ==
Point Of No Return assembled in 1996, initially as a side project of the band Self-Conviction. Point Of No Return's lyrics primarily focused on "Third World struggles" and animal liberation issues. Their sound was described as a mix of Earth Crisis metal mosh with death metal elements. The band had three singers, like their North American counterpart, Path of Resistance.

Point Of No Return's first full-length album, Centelha ("Sparks"), was released on CD by Liberation Records in Brazil and Catalyst Records in the United States. The band toured internationally, first to Europe in 2000 and then to Argentina in 2001. After a seven-month hiatus and an alleged "last show" in Argentina, the band came back with a second album in 2002, Liberdade Imposta, Liberdade Conquistada ("Imposed Freedom, Conquered Freedom") and returned to tour Europe a second time. The songs on this second album—this time with lyrics completely in Portuguese—dealt with sociopolitical issues and were more deeply melancholic, but also carried a strong influence from bands like Cro-Mags, Judge, and Napalm Death.

Point of No Return played their final show in 2006. In 2024, the band returned with a new record, A Linguagem da Recusa ("The Language of Refusal") with songs written between 2002 and 2024.

== Members ==
Current members

- Alexandre "Kalota" Fanuchi – vocals (1996–2006, 2024–present)
- Frederico "Fred" Freitas – vocals (1996–2006, 2024–present)
- Ruy "RF" Fernando – vocals (2024–present)
- Paulo "Juninho" Sangiorgio Jr. – guitar (1999–2006, 2024–present); bass (studio only)
- Leonardo Cantinfras – bass (2024–present)
- Luciano "Lobihno" Juliato – drums (1996–2006, 2024–present)

Former members

- Juninho do Brás – vocals (1996)
- Marcos Suarez – vocals (1996–2005)
- Luciano Valéiro – guitars (1996)
- Tarcísio Leite – guitars (1996–2006)
- Gilberto "China" Gomes – bass (1996–1999)
- Jefferson "Tigrilo" Queiroz – bass (1999–2006); guitars (1996–1999); drums (1996)

== Discography ==
Studio albums

Year	Album	Label	Re-editions
2000	Centelha	Liberation Records (BR) – CD/LP	Dirección Positiva Records (COL) – tape, 2000; Catalyst Records (US) – CD, 2001 (as Sparks)
2002	Liberdade Imposta... Liberdade Conquistada	Liberation Records (BR) – CD	Scorched Earth Policy (GER) – LP, 2002 (as Imposed Freedom... Conquered Freedom); Catalyst Records (US) – CD, 2002 (Portuguese and English titles)
2024	The Language Of Refusal	Indecision Records (US) / Refuse Records (EUR) – streaming/LP	Self-released (BR) – CD, July 2024 (as A Linguagem da Recusa) includes 100 copies with slipcase.; All Music Matters (BR) – CD, fall 2024 (as A Linguagem da Recusa); Big Mess Records (ARG) – tape, fall 2024; Diorama Records (IDN) – tape, fall 2024

Demos and EPs

Year	Album	Label	Re-editions
1998	Point Of No Return (EP)	Catalyst Records (US) – 7" vinyl	Catalyst Records (US) – 7", 1999 (as What Was Done)
1999	Um Convite à Luta (demo)	Self-released (BR) – tape	Firme & Alerta Discos (ARG) – tape, 2000 (as Point Of No Return); Self-released on streaming with new cover, May 2020.

Singles

Title	Details
Guile	Released: July 1, 2024; Label: Indecision, Refuse; Formats: Digital download

Compilation appearances

Year	Song	Album	Label	Format
1997	"Intro / What Was Done" "Bloodless Life" "The End" "Seduction"	Voices – A Portrait Of Sao Paulo Hardcore	Liberation Records	CD
1999	"Tools"	Justice For The Enslaved Vol #1	Sure Hand Records	CD
2000	"Tools"	Firme & Alerta Sampler #1	Firme & Alerta Discos	CD
2002	"The End"	Ya Basta! – A Benefit For Food For Chiapas	Powderkeg Records	CD
2003	"Casa de Cabaclo"	Inside Front #13	CrimethInc	CD
2004	"Tela"	Embrace Zine Compilation Tape	Embrace Zine & Tapes	tape
2005	"Casa De Coboclo"	Sampler Winter 05/06	Catalyst Records	CD
	"Letargia (Live)"	Dor E Sofrimento	Sub Recordings	CD
