= Endstand =

Finnish hardcore punk band

Endstand was a hardcore punk band from Finland. Since they formed in 1996 they have released six full-length albums, a couple EPs and many splits. They performed at numerous hardcore events, including Fluff Fest in the Czech Republic in 2001, 2004, and 2006. Endstand announced their dissolution on January 30, 2008.

== Members ==
=== Final line-up ===
- Janne Tamminen: Vocals
- Joel Sipilä: Bass
- Mika Kaukonen: Guitar
- Pekka Hänninen: Drums

=== Former members ===
- Jani Asp: Guitar (2002–2003)
- Jani: Drums (1996–2000)
- Juho Angervuori: Guitar (2003–2006)
- Henrik "Henkka" Furu: Drums (2000–2005)
- Tapio Vartiainen: Guitar (2006–2007)

== Discography ==
=== Albums ===
- Endstand, MCD (Impression Recordings, 1998)
- Endstand / Aurinkokerho split, MCD (Halla, 1999)
- To Whom It May Concern..., CD (Impression Recordings, 1999)
- Fire Inside, CD/10" (Combat Rock Industry, 2001)
- Endstand / Bora split, cassette (Battery Cage / Fire Inside, 2002)
- Endstand / Kafka split, MCD (No! Records / Fuxony, 2002)
- Never Fall Into Silence, LP/CD (Day After, 2002)
- Hit And Run, MCD/12" (Combat Rock Industry, 2003)
- Burning Bridges, LP/CD (Day After, 2004)
- The Time Is Now, LP/CD (Lifeforce Records/Combat Rock Industry, 2006)
- Spark, LP/CD (Combat Rock Industry, 2007)

=== 7"Inch ===
- Tolerance, 7" (Rising Justice Records, 1997)
- Endstand / Outlast split, 7" (Grey Days/Bridge records, 1997)
- Picture Disc, 7" (Combat Rock Industry, 2000)
