= Die Skeptiker =

German punk rock band

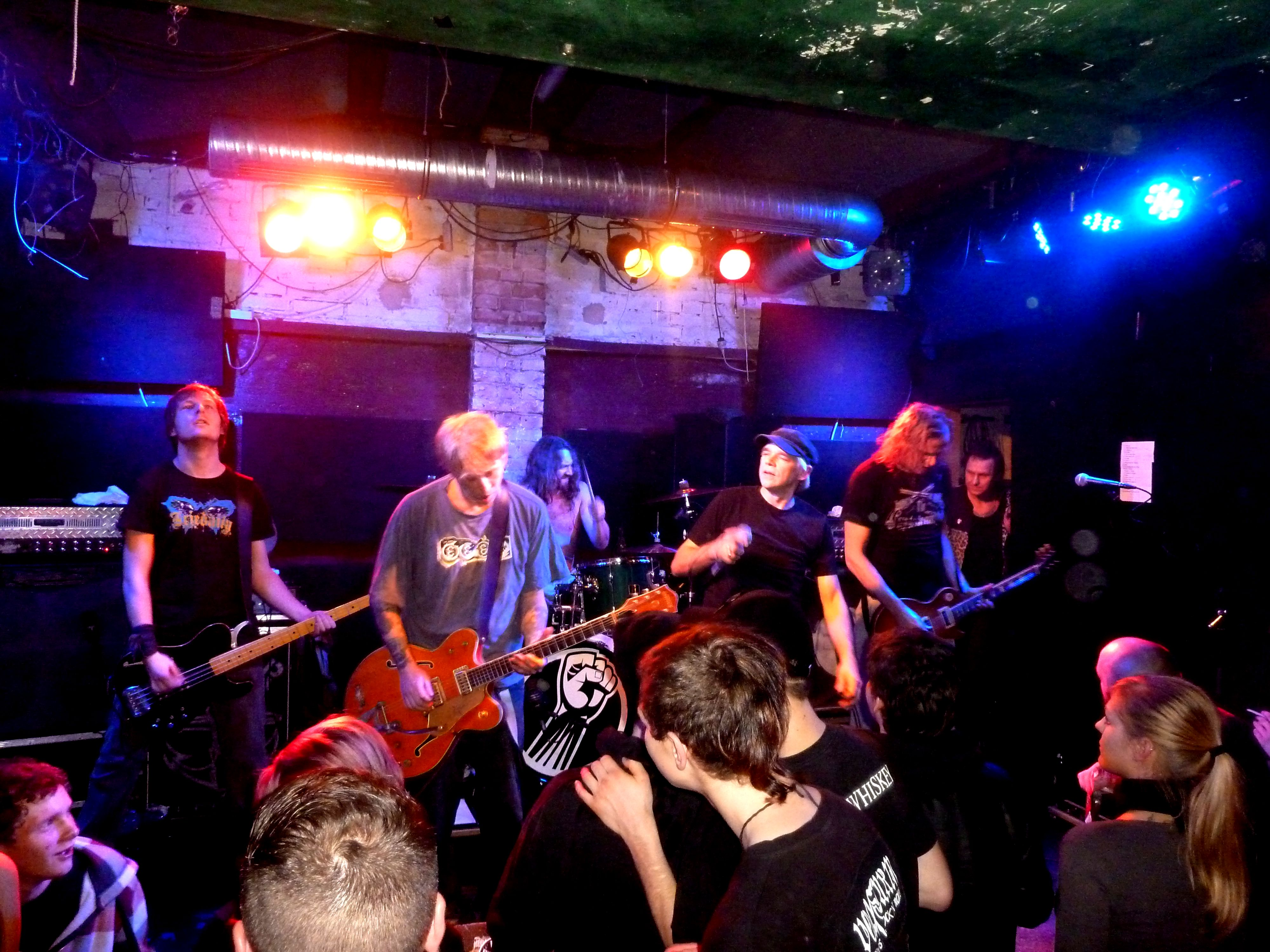
- Die Skeptiker performing in 2012

Background information
- Origin: East Berlin, Germany
- Years active: 1986–2000, 2006–present
- Members: Eugen Balanskat (vocals, since 1986), Dominik Glöckner (guitar, since 2017), Matthias Stephan (guitar, since 2022), Jacob Thauer (bass, since 2018), Wieland Wehr (drums, since 2011)
- Past members: Christoph Buntrock, Andreas Kupsch, Jan Fretwurst, Andreas Welfle, Mathias Kahle, Christoph Zimmermann, Henning Menke, Marcel Hofer, Günther Spalda, Ulli Kusch, Nicolaj Gogow, Lars Thomas, Andy Laaf, Lars Rudel, Kiki Kabel, Tom Schwoll
- Website: www.dieskeptiker.com

Die Skeptiker (English: The Skeptics) is a German punk band founded in 1986 in East Berlin. The band is one of the most significant punk bands in East Germany, and belongs to the group of punk bands known as die anderen Bands, or "KONTA-WAVE" bands along with Sandow, Die Art, Feeling B, Tausend Tonnen Obst, and Die Firma. Although they performed songs critical of the Wall, they were able to gain an official license to perform live shows (Spielerlaubnis) by the East German state by writing intelligent lyrics with criticism between the lines. They were also able to establish themselves in the broader German music scene after German reunification.

== History ==
In 1986, Die Skeptiker was founded by drummer Marcel Hofer, guitarist Christoph BuntRock, guitarist Andreas Kupsch, bass player Andreas Welfle, and singer Eugen Balanskat. The group met when Balanskat was searching for a band; a colleague at the publishing house where he worked provided a contact. During their first meeting in a practice room in the outskirts of Berlin, they wrote the beginnings of the song "JaJaJa“. While working to define a unique sound, the band identified bands they liked as IDEAL, PVC, the Dead Kennedys, and Nina Hagen. The lyrics for die Skeptiker's songs are generally written by Balanskat. One of the original motivations for forming the band was to expand the limitations of what was artistically possible in East Germany at the time. The band's name arose because they could not decide on a name after months of discussion.

Die Skeptiker's music was heavily influenced by the realities of communism in East Germany, and it was long impossible for such underground bands to release records with the official record label Amiga. For this reason, their first two albums, O.T. (Ohne Titel) (English translation: "No Title") in 1988 and Schreie in 1989, were self-released on cassette tape. Because of the band's growing popularity—they drew thousands of fans to open-air concerts, including a crowd of 5,000 people at the 1988 "Insel der Jugend" of the Berliner Rocksommer—the band was offered a FDJ-Fördervertrag (promotional contract from the Free German Youth). Amiga records included them on the anthology Rock-Bilanz '89 and a compilation of new music called Parocktikum in 1989. Amiga also produced and release their 1989 EP Die Anderen Bands and then their LP Harte Zeiten in 1990. Both Schreie and Harte Zeiten include the song "Deadmanstown" that tells the story of a lonely individual; this song includes the line "Schreie hallen durch die Nacht. Zeichen unserer Seelenqual, keiner darf, was er möchte, aber ihr, ihr könnt uns mal." (English translation: "Screams echo in the night. Showing our soul pain, no one is allowed to do what they want, but you, you can (rude expression)." ) Appearing already on O.T., as well as their second and third albums, is the pro-gay song "Alright my Boys", which the band continues to play live today. The album Harte Zeiten also included the song Strahlende Zukunft (English translation: Radiating/Radioactive Future) that comment on the dangers of nuclear power from a point of view of environmental activism.

On April 4, 1990, BuntRock left the band, although he was later active with other bands like Iron Henning and Mamacry.L. On April 5, 1990, Andreas Kupsch (later active with Pink Parsons, Rebentisch, Unglaublicher Vorfall and Die Zusamm-Rottung), Marcel Hofer (later active with Pink Parsons, Halmakenreuther and Sub Dub Micromachine), and Andreas Welfle also left the band. Balanskat looked for other collaborations and continued to produce music as a solo artist.

In 1991 Die Skeptiker released the LP Sauerei with the label Rough Trade/Our Choice. The line-up for this album was Balanskat, Mathias Kahle, Lars Rudel (of Cultus Ferox, Blind Passengers), Jan Fretwurst, and Günther Spalda (of Rosa Extra, Hard Pop, B.R.O.N.X.).

In 1993 they released the album Schwarze Boten; on this release Uli Kusch (known from bands like Ride the Sky, Shockmachine, Axe la Chapelle, Holy Moses, Roland Grapow, Gamma Ray, Beautiful Sin, Mekong Delta, Sinner, Masterplan, and Helloween) replaced Spalda on drums. One year later a live album was released. Then in 1995 Die Skeptiker released Stahlvogelkrieger as a regular LP. Both of these releases included Andy Laaf (of The Cassandra Complex, Blind Passengers, Mad Sin) on the drums and Christoph Zimmermann (of Blind Passengers, Hard Pop, Feeling B, Fat Sheik) on bass.

In 1998 they released Wehr dich!. On this album the long-time band members Balanskat and Rudel were joined by Tom Schwoll (of Kumpelbasis, Sin City Circus Ladies, Jingo de Lunch, Extrabreit), Henning Menke (of Skew Siskin, Jingo de Lunch) and Nicki Gogow (of Knorkator, Deadly Toys, Aschenbach, BOON, Schwarz).

In 2000 Die Skeptiker broke up for a short time. Balanskat founded Rotorfon and then renamed the band Roter Mohn; this new band was dedicated to producing punk rock versions of Schlager music hits from the 1920s, 30s, and 40s.

In 2006 the band celebrated its 20-year anniversary with a reunion tour that played, among other places, in Dresden, Cottbus, and Rostock. In the summer of 2007 they appeared at festivals, including Force Attack. After the end of their contract with Rough Trade, the band's earlier albums were no longer available. Because of this, they re-recorded older songs and assembled them in a "Best-of" album named Dada in Berlin, released in November 2007. The final album includes two new songs. To support this release, they toured in November and Dezember, 2007. In October 2009, the band released a new album Fressen und Moral. In addition they toured in the fall of 2008 and 2009.

At the end of 2012, Die Skeptiker gave two exclusive concerts in Berlin and Dresden; the line-up for these concerts was Balanskat, Rudel, Schwoll, Kiki Kabel (in reality Christopher Zabel, previously with Strom) and Wieland Wehr (previously with Skinny and Rockass). The first song from the new album Aufsteh’n that appeared in September 2013 was played for the first time at these concerts. The release of the new album was supported by a tour in fall 2013.

On January 6, 2018, the album Kein Weg zu weit was released by Destiny Records. This album was in part inspired by the 100th anniversary of the end of the first World War. In March and April 2018 the band launched the first part of the tour of the same name. In the fall of 2018 the second part of this tour followed. At the end of 2019 several additional live shows took place as the 60th birthday celebration of Balanskat, who was born on February 15, 1959. In the same year, Balanskat self-released the song Hinter den Mauern der Stadt with the band Rome as a vinyl 7". In 2020, Balanskat also released an audio book of poetry, titled Innenfrost. At the end of the year, Balanskat released the video single Rohes Fest! with Gassenhoward.

In 2021 continuing collaboration between Balanskat and Rome resulted in a recording of the song Der Rufer in der Wüste schweigt. In 2021 Die Skeptiker self-released the live album Geburtstagsalbum Live Festsaal Kreuzberg 2019. This album was accompanied by singles Komm tanzen and Deutschland halt's Maul, Unmut, and 1918.

On January 25, 2022, the band released a statement that Tom Schwoll was leaving the band. In June a new guitarist, Matthias Stephan, was introduced. On April 22, 2023, die Skeptiker performed at the Mind the Gap Fest in Hamburg.

== Discography ==
=== Studio albums ===
- O.T. (self-released cassette, 1988)
- Schreie (self-released cassette, 1989)
- Harte Zeiten (Amiga records, 1990)
- Sauerei (Rough Trade/Our Choice, 1991)
- Schwarze Boten (Rough Trade/Our Choice, 1993)
- Stahlvogelkrieger (Rough Trade/Our Choice, 1995)
- Wehr Dich! (Rausch Records, 1998)
- DaDa in Berlin - Tondokumente 2007 (Rozbomb Records, 2007)
- Fressen und Moral (Rozbomb Records, 2009)
- Aufsteh'n (Destiny Records, 2013)
- Kein Weg Zu Weit (Destiny Records, 2018)

=== Live Albums ===
- Live (Rough Trade/Our Choice, 1994)
- Geburtstagsalbum Live Festsaal Kreuzberg 2019 (Destiny Records, 2021)

=== Compilation Albums ===
- Die Skeptiker (Amiga Quartet, e.g. 7" with four tracks, 1989)
- Frühe Werke -- compilation album with old tracks from the 1980s (Rebel Records, 1996)

=== Singles ===
- Kein Weg zu weit / Der König rief (7", Wannsee Records, 2016)
- Komm tanzen (Live) (Download-Single, Destiny Records, 2021)
- Deutschland halt's Maul (Live) (Download-Single, Destiny Records, 2021)

=== Contributions to Compilations ===
- "Egal" on "Parocktikum" (LP Compilation, Amiga 856409, 1989)
- "Dada in Berlin" on "Das Album - Rockbilanz 89" (DLP Compilation, Amiga 856474/75, 1989)
- "Jajaja" on "Like an Explosion" (Tape Compilation, Schafstalltapes, 1989)
- "DaDa in Berlin" / "JaJaJa" on "VEB Sampler Teil 1" (Tape Compilation, "AMIGA" 62480, 1989)
- "Besinnung" on "NDR Hörfest / Ruhr-Rock '89" (CD Compilation, EBS 8905, 1989)
- "Egal" on "D.D.R.-Flüchtlinge / KRAKATIT" (Tape Compilation, Kreiskulturhaus "Erich Franz", 1989)
- "Dada in Berlin" on "Grenzfälle" (LP/CD Compilation, Zong 27/2170 025, 1990)
- "Strahlende Zukunft" on "Systemausfall" (LP Compilation, Peking Records / SPV, 1990)
- "Komm tanzen" on "Neues Deutschland" (LP/CD Compilation, A.M. Records SNAKE 21/22, 1990)
- "Allein" / "1933" / "Du stehst vor mir" / "Jajaja" / "Holiday in Cambodia" on "3 x Berlin 88" (Tape Compilation, Aggressive Punk Tapes, 1991)
- "Sauerei" on "Gegen Nazis" (LP/CD Compilation, Rough Trade Deutschland, 1992)
- "Straßenkampf" on "Schlachtrufe BRD II" (LP/CD Compilation, A.M. Records SNAKE 38/39, 1992)
- "Der Rufer in der Wüste schweigt" on "Hallo 13" (CD Compilation, Vielklang, 1992)
- "Komm tanzen, auf" on "Partisanen" (LP/CD Compilation, Day-Glo 21 / Rough Trade, 1992)
- "Einheizfestival" (live Wuhlheide 2.10.1992) (Tape, 1992)
- "Berlin" on "Aus deutschen Kellern I" (Tape Compilation, Müll Tapes No.02, 1994)
- "Total TV" / "Immer wenn du denkst" / "Höllenleben" / "Verrat" / "Schieß doch" (12"EP, Our Choice / RTD 195.3068.0, 1995)
- "Besinnung" on "Aus deutschen Kellern III" (Tape Compilation, Müll Tapes No.10, 1996)
- "Da Da in Berlin" on "Kunst & Beton - Musik aus Berlin" (Tape Compilation, Heimat Kassetten HK 22, 199?)
- "Wehr dich!" on "Die Punk Un-Correctness EP" (7"EP/MCD, Amöbenklang AKEP 22, 1998)
- "Wehr dich!" on "Vorwärts und nicht vergessen! 2" (CD Compilation, Day-Glo 70, 1999)
- "Deutschland halt's Maul" on "Pop 2000 - 50 Jahre Popmusik & Jugendkultur in Deutschland" (8-CD-Box Compilation, Grönland, 1999)
- "JaJaJa" / "DaDa in Berlin" on "Auferstanden aus Ruinen - Der Soundtrack zur Wiedervereinigung" (CD Compilation, Nasty Vinyl NV 97 CD, 1999)
- "Wehr dich!" on "Der Hanfsampler Vol.1" (CD Compilation, African Dance Records ADR 008–2, 199?)
- "Dada in Berlin" on "Wie Feuer und Flamme (Soundtrack)" (CD, Sing Sing / BMG Berlin Musik GmbH, 2001)
- "Dada in Berlin" on "Führer Ex (Original Soundtrack)" (CD Compilation, Subway Records, 2002)
- "Glaub an dich" on "Skandal und Krawall" (CD Compilation, KFZ Records 004, 2007)
- "Wochenendgewalt" on "Aggropunk Vol.1" (CD Compilation, Aggressive Punk Produktionen AGP 001, 2010)
