= Ieperfest =

Belgian hardcore music festival

- Genre: Hardcore; metalcore; post-hardcore; punk rock
- Dates: January, February, March, July, August, September
- Locations: Ypres, Belgium
- Years active: 1992, 1994–present
- Founders: Edward Verhaeghe
- Organiser: ATC Vort'n Vis; ART Vort'n Vis; Republik Vort'n Vis; Genet Records; Pyrrhus Records
- Website: https://www.ieperfest.com/

Ieperfest is a Belgian hardcore music festival held in Ypres (Dutch: Ieper). The summer edition of the festival was first held in September 1992, then annually each August from 1994 to 2018 (no summer event was held in 1993). Since 2019, the summer edition has been held annually each July. In February 2008, a winter edition was introduced, which was held annually in either February or March, until 2015 (no winter event was held in 2009). The winter edition has since been held sporadically, namely in 2018 and 2022. In 2012, during its 20th anniversary, Ieperfest became the longest-running hardcore festival in the world.

From 1992 to 1998, the festival was held inside De Vort'n Vis concert venue in Ypres; but starting with the 1999 edition, outdoor locations have been used to accommodate a growing audience. The 1999 and 2000 editions were held in the open courtyard of the Stedelijke Academie voor Muziek en Woord music school. From 2001 to 2007, the festival was held at the Jeugdstadion Camping Site parking lot (with the exception of 2002 when it was held on the grounds of the CID Lines company). In 2008, Ieperfest moved to its current open air location on Poperingseweg.

The festival was first organized by Edward Verhaeghe, owner of the record label Warehouse Records (now Good Life Recordings), in September 1992. Verhaeghe has had little involvement in the booking of the festival following its first year. Hans Verbeke, owner of Sober Mind Records and an employee at De Vort'n Vis, took over for the 1994 and 1995 editions, until Bruno Vandevyvere, owner of Genet Records and Pyrrhus Records and an owner of De Vort'n Vis, became the main organizer in 1996; a position he continues to hold.

Though Ieperfest has historically focused on metalcore bands, a wide variety of hardcore and metal groups have also performed throughout its span, including emotional hardcore, post-hardcore, punk rock, grindcore, death metal, thrash metal, sludge metal, doom metal and stoner rock. The festival has been singled out as influential to Michal Kočan, who cited it as his motivator to start his own Czech music festival, Fluff Fest.

== History ==
Ieperfest was first conceived in 1992 by Belgian vocalist Edward Verhaeghe, a hardcore musician who had played in such bands as The Midnight Men, Rise Above and Nations on Fire, and was then operating the record label Warehouse Records. Verhaeghe would later establish the noted Belgian hardcore record label Good Life Recordings.

Although Verhaeghe resided in Kortrijk, Belgium, he booked his new festival at De Vort'n Vis, a popular concert venue for hardcore bands located 30 minutes away in Ypres, Belgium. The festival was not booked again in 1993.

In 1994, another noted Kortrijk, Belgium-based musician, Hans Verbeke, took over the booking of the festival. Verbeke worked at De Vort'n Vis, and had played in such bands as Rise Above, Shortsight, Blindfold, Spirit of Youth, Wheel of Progress (and later Liar) and was also operating the hardcore record label Sober Mind Records. Verbeke also booked the 1995 edition.

In 1996, the festival was taken over by Ghent, Belgium-based Bruno Vandevyvere, owner of the record label Genet Records and the record store Pyrrhus Records. Vandevyvere was one of the founders of De Vort'n Vis and had therefore been involved in the first three editions' bookings to some extent. In 1999, Genet Records released the compact disc Various Artists compilation Vort'n Vis Hardcore Festival 1998, which documented most of the bands that had performed at the 1998 edition of the festival.

By 1999, the festival had outgrown the audience capacity of De Vort'n Vis, and for the next two years, it was held in the courtyard of Stedelijke Academie voor Muziek en Woord. In December 2000, Good Life Recordings released the VHS Good Life Recordings Presents: Good Life T.V. Video Sampler #1, which includes live footage of bands performing at the 1999 and 2000 editions of the festival.

In 2001, the festival was moved to the parking lot of the Jeugdstadion campsite, where previous years' attendees setup living accommodations. In 2002, the parking lot was unavailable due to a mountainbicycle event, so local business CID Lines offered their land to host the festival.

In February 2008, a one-day winter edition of the festival was introduced, which was held annually in February or March until 2015 (no winter event was held in 2009). A winter edition was originally planned for February 21, 2009, but was cancelled when the bookers were unable to find headlining acts. The winter edition has since been held sporadically, namely in 2018 and 2022.

In August 2008, Ieperfest moved to a new location, where it continues to be held each year, on a farmland at Poperingseweg 153–161. That year also introduced two stages for bands to perform.

== Ieperfest lineups by year ==
=== September 5–6, 1992: Hardcore '92 Festival ===
Location: De Vort'n Vis, Kiekenmarkt 7, 8900, Ypres, Belgium.

==== Saturday, September 5 ====
- Blindfold
- Feeding the Fire
- Ironside (headliners)
- No More
- Shortsight
- Spirit of Youth
- Strong Event

==== Sunday, September 6 ====
- Abolition
- Nations on Fire (headliners)
- Strengthen the Will

=== August 19–21, 1994: Hardcore Festival '94 ===
Location: De Vort'n Vis, Kiekenmarkt 7, 8900, Ypres, Belgium.

==== Friday, August 19 ====
- Congress
- Kosjer D
- Spawn (headliners)

==== Saturday, August 20 ====
- Abhinanda
- Acme
- Backdraft
- Blindfold
- Fabric (headliners)
- Nothing Left to Grasp
- Refused
- Shortsight

==== Sunday, August 21 ====
- Feeding the Fire
- Iconoclast (headliners)
- Hopeman Path
- Neckbrace
- Undone

Notes: The following bands were also booked but did not play: Nations on Fire, Neuthrone, Scraps, Strength of the Will, State of Grace, Stormwatch and Voorhees.

=== August 18–20, 1995: Hardcore-Festival '95 ===
Location: De Vort'n Vis, Kiekenmarkt 7, 8900, Ypres, Belgium.

==== Friday, August 18 ====
- Burning Defeat (headliners)
- Solid
- The Jedi

==== Saturday, August 19 ====
- Abhinanda (headliners)
- Blindfold
- Comrades
- Concrete
- Congress
- Doughnuts
- Kosjer D
- Mainstrike
- Rancor
- Veil

==== Sunday, August 20 ====
- By All Means
- Chokehold (headliners)
- Churn
- End in Sight
- Fungus
- Liar
- Timebomb

Notes: The following bands were also booked but did not play: Regression and Steadfast.

=== August 16–18, 1996: Hardcore, The Next Generation ===
Location: De Vort'n Vis, Kiekenmarkt 7, 8900, Ypres, Belgium.

==== Friday, August 16 ====
- Down for the Count
- Facedown
- Firestone
- Liar
- Outrage
- Spawn
- Unborn (headliners)
- Victims of Society
- Vitality

==== Saturday, August 17 ====
- Burning Defeat
- Congress
- Despair (headliners)
- Kindred
- Racial Abuse
- Regression
- Said I Was
- Sektor
- Timebomb
- Voices at the Front

==== Sunday, August 18 ====
- Approach to Concrete
- Bruma
- Resist the Pain
- Separation
- Spineless
- Stampin' Ground
- Swing Kids (headliners)
- Vanilla
- With Love

Notes: The following bands were also booked but did not play: Azure, Blindfold, Contention and Refused.

=== August 15–17, 1997: Hardcore: The Next Generation ===
Location: De Vort'n Vis, Kiekenmarkt 7, 8900, Ypres, Belgium.

==== Friday, August 15 ====
- Abhinanda
- Clouded
- Endstand
- Facedown
- Instinct
- Purification
- Reiziger
- Spineless
- Veil (headliners)

==== Saturday, August 16 ====
- Blindfold
- Culture (headliners)
- Intensity
- Kindred
- Liar
- Metroshifter
- ODK-Crew
- Sektor
- Serene
- Spirit of Youth
- Thumbsdown

==== Sunday, August 17 ====
- Acheborn
- Congress
- Deformity
- Lifecycle
- Mainstrike
- Morning Again (headliners)
- Rubbish Heap
- Starmarket
- Vitality

=== August 14–16, 1998: Hardcore: The Next Generation Festival ===
Location: De Vort'n Vis, Kiekenmarkt 7, 8900, Ypres, Belgium.

==== Friday, August 14 ====
- Building
- Contrition
- Culture (headliners)
- Driven
- Liar
- One Fine Day
- One More
- Stack
- Timebomb

==== Saturday, August 15 ====
- Clouded
- Earthmover (headliners)
- Facedown
- Highscore
- Opposite Force
- Pray Silent
- Sad Origin
- Seein' Red
- Spineless
- Thumbsdown

==== Sunday, August 16 ====
- Arkangel
- Ashlar
- Caliban
- Congress (headliners)
- D.S.A.
- Eyeball
- Firestone
- Inflexible
- Lifecycle
- Reply
- Reiziger

Notes: Most of the bands that played were documented on the Genet Records Various Artists compilation Vort'n Vis Hardcore Festival 1998, released on compact disc in 1999.

=== August 20–22, 1999: Ieper Hardcore Festival ===
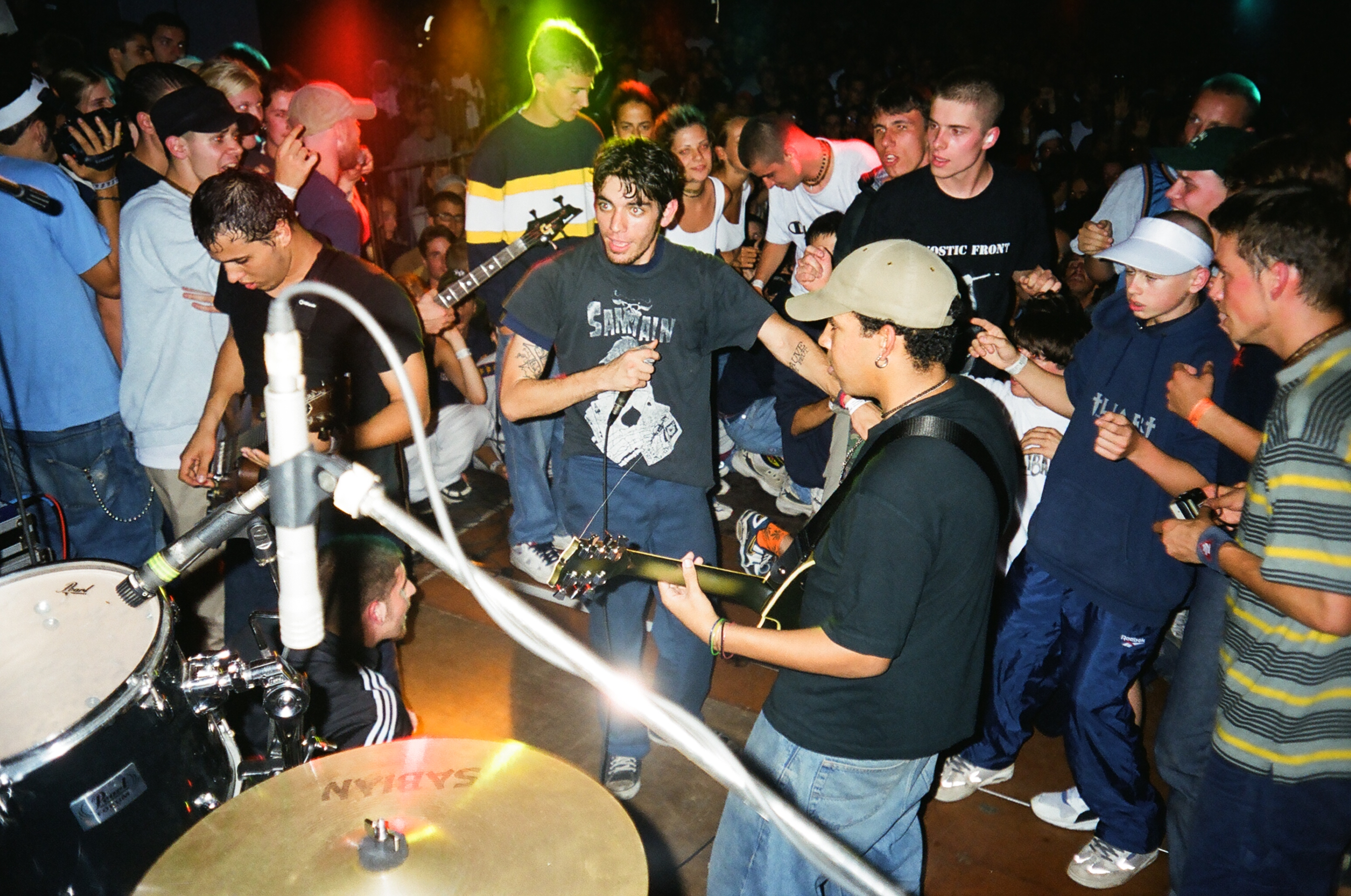
American melodic hardcore band As Friends Rust performing at Ieper Hardcore Festival on August 20, 1999.

Location: Stedelijke Academie voor Muziek en Woord, D'hondtstraat 59, 8900, Ypres, Belgium.

==== Friday, August 20 ====
- 100 Years Of Forgetting
- As Friends Rust (headliners)
- Discount
- Heaven Shall Burn
- Hebriana
- Hot Water Music
- JR Ewing
- Once...Never Again
- Mainstrike
- Sad Origin
- Surface
- Tumult

==== Saturday, August 21 ====
- Ananda
- Bloodpact
- Ensign (headliners)
- H-Street
- Ochtenddauw
- Pray Silent
- Product
- Redemption
- Reveal
- Sabeth
- Spineless
- Stroke of Grace
- Thumbs Down

==== Sunday, August 22 ====
- Facedown
- Instinct
- Jane
- John Holmes
- Leiah
- Point of View
- Reaching Forward
- Sunrise
- The Get Up Kids (headliners)
- True Blue
- Vitality

Notes: Good Life Recordings released the VHS Good Life Recordings Presents: Good Life T.V. Video Sampler #1 in December 2000 which includes live footage of bands performing at the 1999 and 2000 editions of the festival.

=== August 18–20, 2000: Vort'n Vis Hardcore Festival 2000 ===
Location: Stedelijke Academie voor Muziek en Woord, D'hondtstraat 59, 8900, Ypres, Belgium.

==== Thursday, August 17 ====
- Killed in Action
- Retalliate
- Search of Fury
- Striker

Notes: This was a free pre-festival concert held at De Vort'n Vis.

==== Friday, August 18 ====
- Amenra
- Ariel Kill Him
- Building
- Cast in Fire
- Cataract
- Ensign (headliners)
- January Star
- Lumen
- Reiziger
- Serene
- Voorhees
- With Love

==== Saturday, August 19 ====
- 5 Day Get Away
- Born from Pain
- Circle
- Dawncore
- Evanesce
- Firestone
- Good Clean Fun
- Grade (headliners)
- Knut
- Leiah
- Negate
- Point of No Return
- Possession
- Sad Origin

==== Sunday, August 20 ====
- As Friends Rust (headliners)
- Bobby Peru
- Children of Fall
- Course of Action
- Inane
- Length of Time
- Oil
- One Fine Day
- Purification
- Reveal
- Severance
- Standing Tall
- Stigmata

Notes: The following bands were also booked but did not play: Chispa, Convinced, Garrison, Out for Blood, Piebald, Shai Hulud and Walls of Jericho. As Friends Rust's set was cut short after only three songs. Good Life Recordings released the VHS Good Life Recordings Presents: Good Life T.V. Video Sampler #1 in December 2000 which includes live footage of bands performing at the 1999 and 2000 editions of the festival.

=== August 17–19, 2001: 2001: A Hardcore Odyssey ===
Location: Jeugdstadion Camping Site Parking Lot, Leopold III - Laan 16, Ypres, Belgium.

==== Thursday, August 16 ====
- DJ Schelpe

Notes: This was a free pre-festival party held at De Vort'n Vis.

==== Friday, August 17 ====
- Caliban
- Children of Fall
- Course of Action
- Deadbolt
- The Deal
- E-150
- Endstand
- From the Dying Sky
- Good Clean Fun (headliners)
- Retaliate
- Severance
- Unconquered

==== Saturday, August 18 ====
- Catharsis
- Circle
- Comrades
- Juliette
- Liar
- Man VS Humanity
- New End Original
- Possession
- Reproach
- Stack
- The Locust (headliners)
- The Oath
- Venerea

==== Sunday, August 19 ====
- Burden
- Concrete
- Die...My Demon
- Facedown
- Kingpin
- Leiah
- Manifesto Jukebox
- Maximum Penalty (headliners)
- Newborn
- PN
- Reliance

Notes: After-parties were held on Friday, Saturday and Sunday nights at De Vort'n Vis with DJ Jaak. Reveal was booked to play but did not.

=== August 16–18, 2002: Ieperfest 2002 ===
Location: CID Lines Festival Ground, Waterpoortstraat 2, 8900, Ypres, Belgium.

==== Thursday, August 15 ====
===== De Vort'n Vis =====
- Kombat
- Retaliate (headliners)
- Straight to the Bar
- Zero Tolerance

Notes: This was a free pre-festival concert held at De Vort'n Vis.

===== Jeugdstadion =====
- Amenra
- S.F.P.
- The Diamond Sea (headliners)
- The Eliot Ness
- The Hors D'Oeuvres
- Wilson

Notes: This was a free pre-festival concert held at the Jeugdstadion campground.

==== Friday, August 16 ====
- Absence
- Born from Pain
- Chimaera
- Congress (headliners)
- Die...My Demon
- I Adapt
- JR Ewing
- Max Rebo Kids
- Morda
- Newborn
- Pretty Girls Make Graves
- Smut Peddlers
- Reply
- Risen

==== Saturday, August 17 ====
- Burn Hollywood Burn
- Cast-Down
- Darkest Hour
- Dead Stop
- Degradation
- Heaven Shall Burn (headliners)
- Length of Time
- Nothing Gold Can Stay
- Severance
- Square One
- Strike Anywhere
- Sunrise
- The Deal
- Trial by Fire

==== Sunday, August 18 ====
- Absone
- Amulet
- As Friends Rust (headliners)
- Between the Lines
- Circle
- Deformity
- Fear My Thoughts
- Flatcat
- Let it Burn
- Point of No Return
- Pointing Finger
- Sworn In
- The Zaccharia

Notes: After-parties were held on Friday, Saturday and Sunday nights at De Vort'n Vis with DJ Jaak.

=== August 15–17, 2003: Ieper Hardcore Festival ===
Location: Jeugdstadion Camping Site Parking Lot, Leopold III - Laan 16, Ypres, Belgium.

==== Thursday, August 14 ====
- 1 Outta 6
- Die...My Demon
- Forced Hate
- I Adapt
- Strength Approach

Notes: This was a free pre-festival concert held at the Jeugdstadion campground.

==== Friday, August 15 ====
- .Calibre (headliners)
- Career Suicide
- Death Before Disco
- Es La Guerilla
- I Shot Cyrus
- Liar
- Miracle of 86
- Nothing Gold Can Stay
- One Fine Cast
- Pointing Finger
- Severance
- Solid
- The Horror
- White Circle Crime Club

==== Saturday, August 16 ====
- Agathocles
- All Out War (headliners)
- Cataract
- Discarga
- Empathy
- Fear of God
- Himsa
- Integrity
- Morda
- Narziss
- No Denial
- Nueva Ética
- Senseless
- The Miles Apart

==== Sunday, August 17 ====
- Afterlife
- Born from Pain
- Caliban (headliners)
- Confronto
- Cornflames
- Dead Stop
- Engrave
- Face Tomorrow
- Kingpin
- Length of Time
- Strychnine
- The Set Up
- Vuur

Notes: The following bands were also booked but did not play: Last Days of April, The Furious and The Locust.

=== August 27–29, 2004: Ieper Hardcore Fest 2004 ===
Location: Jeugdstadion Camping Site Parking Lot, Leopold III - Laan 16, Ypres, Belgium.

==== Thursday, August 26 ====
- 37 Stabwoundz
- Minus 45 Degrees
- One Fine Cast (headliners)
- Self Reflection

Notes: This was a free pre-festival concert held at the Jeugdstadion campground.

==== Friday, August 27 ====
- Bathtub Shitter
- Between the Lines
- Bridge to Solace
- Children of Gaia
- Dead Stop (headliners)
- Horse the Band
- Integrity
- Last Hope
- No Turning Back
- Ratos de Porão
- Shredder
- Some Girls
- The Oath
- Vitamin X
- With Love

==== Saturday, August 28 ====
- 25 ta Life
- Amenra
- Caliban (headliners)
- Chimaera
- Colligere
- Die...My Demon
- In Arm's Reach
- Mental
- Mörser
- Nine
- Purification
- Retaliate
- Satanic Surfers
- Vanilla
- Year Future

==== Sunday, August 29 ====
- Ariel Kill Him
- Congress
- Destiny
- Fabulous Disaster
- Facedowninshit
- Hitch
- Morda
- Most Precious Blood (headliners)
- Nothing Gold Can Stay
- One Outta Six
- Pretty Girls Make Graves
- Rise and Fall
- Seven Feet Four
- Switchblade

Notes: The following bands were also booked but did not play: Death by Stereo, Disfear, Over My Dead Body and Rag Men.

=== August 26–28, 2005: Ieper Hardcore Fest ===
Location: Jeugdstadion Camping Site Parking Lot, Leopold III - Laan 16, Ypres, Belgium.

==== Friday, August 26 ====
- Another Breath
- Born from Pain
- Children of Fall
- Confronto
- Leng Tch'e
- Liar
- Maudlin
- Misery Index (headliners)
- Requiem
- The Death of Anna Karina
- The Maple Room
- The Setup
- The Spectacle
- Values Intact
- Verse

==== Saturday, August 27 ====
- Amanda Woodward
- Amenra
- Beecher
- Born/Dead
- Core of Anger
- Darkest Hour (headliners)
- Deadlock
- Deadsoil
- Do or Die
- Ikaros
- Minus45Degrees
- Reflux
- Rejuvenate
- Starkweather
- The Je Ne Sais Quoi
- Trust

==== Sunday, August 28 ====
- Aborted
- Awoken
- Chimaera
- Das Oath (headliners)
- Die...My Demon
- For the Glory
- Fucked Up
- Hoods
- Justice
- Knuckledust
- Mental
- Officer Jones and His Patrol Car Problems
- Panthers
- Seein' Red
- The Rites

Notes: The following bands were also booked but did not play: Donnybrook, Kill Your Idols, Full Circle Broken, Morning Again and Neshamah. Morning Again was supposed to perform a headlining reunion show on August 27, 2005, but cancelled their trip to Europe.

=== August 25–27, 2006: Ieper Hardcore Festival ===
Location: Jeugdstadion Camping Site Parking Lot, Leopold III - Laan 16, Ypres, Belgium.

==== Friday, August 25 ====
- Amenra
- Angel Crew
- Caliban (headliners)
- Congress
- Neaera
- New Mexican Disaster Squad
- Paint It Black
- Psalm
- Rafflesia
- Restless Youth
- Strike First
- Switchblade
- Taint
- Textures
- The Chariot
- True Colors

==== Saturday, August 26 ====
- 100 Demons
- Black Friday 29
- Blood Redemption
- JR Ewing
- Liar
- MDC
- Officer Jones and His Patrol Car Problems
- PN
- Rumble in Rhodos
- Settle the Score
- Sunpower
- Sworn Enemy (headliners)
- The Boss
- The Ocean
- The Sedan Vault
- Zero Mentality

==== Sunday, August 27 ====
- Ashema
- Clobberin Time
- Die!
- First Alliance
- Maroon (headliners)
- Minus45Degrees
- Parkway Drive
- Remembering Never
- Reproach
- Rise and Fall
- Shai Hulud
- Six Foot Ditch
- Skinless
- Strength Approach

Notes: The following bands were also booked but did not play: A Perfect Murder, Alove for Enemies, Cephalic Carnage, Circle One, Death Before Disco, Inked in Blood, Killing Time, Lords, Monochrome, Nodes of Ranvier, Subzero and Trapdoor Fucking Exit.

=== August 24–26, 2007: Ieper Hardcore Fest ===
Location: Jeugdstadion Camping Site Parking Lot, Leopold III - Laan 16, Ypres, Belgium.

==== Thursday, August 23 ====
- All My Sins
- Collapsed
- Demon Squad (headliners)
- Mans Ruin
- The Boss

Notes: This was a free pre-festival concert held at the J.O.C. in Ieper.

==== Friday, August 24 ====
- As We Fight
- B.U.S.H.
- Deadsoil
- Eye of Judgment
- Fear My Thoughts
- Losing Streak
- Madball (headliners)
- No Recess
- No Trigger
- No Turning Back
- Rise and Fall
- Set Your Goals
- Six Foot Ditch
- The Setup
- True Colors
- World Collapse

==== Saturday, August 25 ====
- Aborted
- Black Haven
- Blacklisted
- Blood Redemption
- Cold as Life
- Fall of Serenity
- H8INC
- Human Demise
- Justice
- Knuckledust
- Murphy's Law
- Nothing Done
- Rafflesia
- The Black Dahlia Murder (headliners)
- The Ocean
- Victims

==== Sunday, August 26 ====
- Bane (headliners)
- Born from Pain
- Cataract
- Ceremony
- Deadlock
- Dying Fetus
- Fatal Recoil
- Have Heart
- Kaospilot
- Red Dons
- Shredder
- The Maple Room
- To Kill
- The Revisions

Notes: The following bands were also booked but did not play: Age of Ruin, Cephalic Carnage, Cult of Luna, Maroon, Lost Patrol Band, Nueva Ética Ruiner, Showbread and Wisdom in Chains.

=== February 9, 2008: Ieper Hardcore Fest Winter Edition ===
Location: Zaal Fenix, Leopold III - Laan 16, Ypres, Belgium.

==== Saturday, February 9 ====
- Blessed by a Broken Heart
- Blood Stands Still
- For the Glory
- Furious Styles
- Municipal Waste (headliners)
- Psalm
- Rhythm to the Madness
- Shattered Realm
- The Setup
- Toxic Holocaust
- Trenchfoot
- Your Demise

=== August 22–24, 2008, Ieper Hardcore Festival 2008 ===
Location: Poperingseweg 153–161, 8908, Ypres, Belgium.

==== Thursday, August 21 ====
- Crossed the Line
- Link
- Omerta (headliners)
- Saviour
- The Brave Do Not Fear the Grave

Notes: This was a free pre-festival concert held on the Marquee Stage at Ieperfest.

==== Friday, August 22 ====
===== Main Stage =====
- All Shall Perish
- As Friends Rust
- Backfire!
- Blood Spencer
- Bridge to Solace
- Counting the Days
- Do or Die
- Lionheart
- Pulling Teeth
- Skarhead
- Sworn Enemy (headliners)
- Wisdom in Chains

===== Marquee Stage =====
- After All
- Cancer Bats
- Danny Diablo
- Die...My Demon
- Fallen
- Fucked Up (headliners)
- Kingdom
- Maudlin
- Ruiner
- The Berzerker
- The Bones

==== Saturday, August 23 ====
===== Main Stage =====
- All My Sins
- Betrayed
- Bloodclot
- Common Cause
- Heartbreak Kid
- Homer
- Length of Time
- Maintain
- Nothing Gold Can Stay
- Parkway Drive (headliners)
- Pushed Too Far

===== Marquee Stage =====
- Active Minds
- Amenra (headliners)
- Discarga
- Jerusalem the Black
- John Joseph
- Mans Ruin
- Mörser
- See You Next Tuesday
- Trigger the Bloodshed
- Zann

==== Sunday, August 24 ====
===== Main Stage =====
- Folsom
- H_{2}O
- Have Heart
- Rhythm to the Madness
- Rise and Fall
- Shipwreck
- Sunpower
- Surge of Fury
- The Locust (headliners)
- Verse
- Vogue

===== Marquee Stage =====
- A Wilhelm Scream (headliners)
- Cephalic Carnage
- Despised Icon
- Do Androids Dream of Electric Sheep?
- Endzweck
- Hello Bastards
- Fear My Thoughts
- Psalm
- Trentchfoot
- Vicious Circle

Notes: The following bands were also booked but did not play: Balzac, Hour of the Wolf, Outbreak, Pound for Pound, Red Tape Parade, Ringworm, Rotten Sound, Shook Ones, Sinking Ships, Soul Control, Sparkle of Hope, SS Decontrol and Warbringer.

=== August 28–30, 2009: Ieper Hardcore Festival 2009 ===
Location: Poperingseweg 153–161, 8908, Ypres, Belgium.

==== Thursday, August 27 ====
- Fundamental (headliners)
- Golden Bullet
- Open Sesame
- Sensual Noise
- The Ignored

Notes: This was a free pre-festival concert held on the Marquee Stage at Ieperfest.

==== Friday, August 28 ====
===== Main Stage =====
- Alcatraz
- Bane
- Down to Nothing
- First Blood
- Mina Caputo
- Kingdom
- Outrage
- Rhinoceros
- Teenage Lust
- Terror (headliners)
- Wait in Vain

===== Marquee Stage =====
- Architects (headliners)
- Bandanos
- Crimson Falls
- Die Young
- Misery Signals
- Spoil Engine
- Stigma
- The Number Twelve Looks Like You
- True Colors
- Your Demise

==== Saturday, August 29 ====
===== Main Stage =====
- 108
- Balance
- Blood Redemption
- Darkest Hour (headliners)
- Deal with It
- Hoods
- Knuckledust
- Lewd Acts
- Oatbreaker
- The Boss
- The Effort

===== Marquee Stage =====
- Gold Kids
- Julith Krishun
- Liar
- Nasty
- ON
- Raein
- Rise and Fall (headliners)
- Skare Tactic
- Soul Control
- Suckinim Baenaim
- Trash Talk

==== Sunday, August 30 ====
===== Main Stage =====
- Black Haven
- Bold (headliners)
- Bringin' It Down
- Days of Betrayal
- Disembodied
- Morda
- Polar Bear Club
- Ritual
- Set Your Goals
- The Setup

===== Marquee Stage =====
- A Wilhelm Scream (headliners)
- Aborted
- Annotations of an Autopsy
- Burning Skies
- Chuck Ragan
- Diablo Boulevard
- Nueva Ética
- Reagan Youth
- Trigger the Bloodshed
- Viatrophy

Notes: The following bands were also booked but did not play: An Emerald City, As We Fight, Blood Stands Still, For the Fallen Dreams, Impending Doom, Joe Coffee, Lower Class Brats, Misery Index, Psyopus, Rafflesia and Thick as Blood.

=== February 6, 2010: Ieper Hardcore Fest 2010 Winter Edition ===
Location: Zaal Fenix, Leopold III - Laan 16, Ypres, Belgium.

==== Saturday, February 6 ====
- A Plea for Purging
- Arsonists Get All the Girls
- Brutality Will Prevail
- For the Glory
- Headshot
- Link
- Rafflesia
- Rise and Fall (headliners)
- Salt the Wound
- Trapped Under Ice
- Victims
- War from a Harlots Mouth

=== August 13–15, 2010: Ieper Hardcore Fest ===
Location: Poperingseweg 153–161, 8908, Ypres, Belgium.

==== Friday, August 13, Saturday, August 14 and Sunday, August 15 ====
===== Main Stage and Marquee Stage =====
- 50 Lions
- 7 Seconds
- Agnostic Front (headliners)
- Alarma Man
- All Out War
- Amenra
- An Emerald City
- Annotations of an Autopsy
- Antagonist A.D.
- As We Fight
- Atlas Losing Grip
- Aussitot Mort
- Barn Burner
- Bitter End
- Bleed from Within
- Bleed Into One
- Bloody Phoenix
- Born from Pain
- Born to Lose
- Breakdown
- Brutality Will Prevail
- Carpathian
- Cataract
- Cerebral Ballzy
- Cold Existence
- Confronto
- Converge (headliners)
- Crossed the Line
- Cruel Hand
- Despised Icon
- Dying Fetus
- For the Glory
- Forensics
- Gaza
- Gravemaker
- Hang the Bastard
- In Blood We Trust
- Kingdom
- Knut
- Kvelertak
- Kylsea
- Madball (headliners)
- Miles Away
- Next Step Up
- New Morality
- No Turning Back
- Origin
- Paura
- Purification
- Rafflesia
- Raised Fist
- Reproach
- Ruiner
- SSS
- Strength Approach
- Strength for a Reason
- The Black Dahlia Murder
- The Black Heart Rebellion
- The End of All Reason
- This Is a Standoff
- Trash Talk
- Ufomammut
- Vitamin X
- Voivod

Notes: An accurate schedule of the performance dates and stages has not been located in archival material, therefore all of the bands from the summer 2010 edition are currently listed together. Should a schedule be found, the sections will be updated. The following bands were also booked but did not play: Campus, City of Ships, Dead Swans, Lewd Acts, Maximum Penalty, Rat City Riot, Slapshot, The Carrier, The Now Denial and The Freeze.

=== February 26, 2011: Ieper Hardcore Fest Winter Edition ===
Location: Zaal Fenix, Leopold III - Laan 16, Ypres, Belgium.

==== Saturday, February 26 ====
- Anti-Icon
- Armagathas
- Carpathian
- Crimson Falls
- Defeater (headliners)
- Hive Destruction
- Knuckledust
- Last Hope
- Length of Time
- Musth
- Shaped by Fate
- The Setup

Notes: The following bands were also booked but did not play: Let Me Run, Möse, Soul Control and The Gohards.

=== August 12–14, 2011: Ieper Hardcore Fest 2011 ===
Location: Poperingseweg 153–161, 8908, Ypres, Belgium.

==== Thursday, August 11 ====
- Get Wise
- Grizzlyncher
- Hessian (headliners)
- One Step Beyond

Notes: This was a charged pre-festival concert held at the JOC 't Perron.

==== Friday, August 12 ====
===== Main Stage =====
- Anchor
- CDC
- Comeback Kid (headliners)
- Crawlspace
- Death Is Not Glamorous
- Headshot
- Ritual
- Sheer Terror
- Six Foot Ditch
- Soul Control
- Strife

===== Marquee Stage =====
- And So I Watch You from Afar (headliners)
- Black Kites
- Cheap Girls
- Ghostlimb
- Horse the Band
- La Dispute
- Lemuria
- The Ignored
- The Stupids
- Touché Amoré
- Victims

==== Saturday, August 13 ====
===== Main Stage =====
- Against Your Society
- All Teeth
- Angel Crew
- Exodus
- First Blood
- Golden Bullet
- Meshuggah (headliners)
- Stick to Your Guns
- Strike Anywhere
- Sworn Enemy
- The Carrier

===== Marquee Stage =====
- Agathocles
- City of Ships
- Drop Dead (headliners)
- Jonah Matranga
- Mondo Gecko
- Oathbreaker
- Polikarpa Y Sus Viciosas
- Red Tape Parade
- Reiziger
- Shadows Chasing Ghosts
- Xibalba

==== Sunday, August 14 ====
===== Main Stage =====
- Betrayal
- Black Haven
- Blood for Blood
- Bury Your Dead
- Death Before Dishonor
- Fatal Recoil
- For the Fallen Dreams
- Ignite
- Kvelertak
- The Dillinger Escape Plan (headliners)

===== Marquee Stage =====
- A Wilhelm Scream
- Decapitated (headliners)
- Drums Are for Parades
- EF
- Exhumed
- Musth
- Swashbuckle
- The Mahones
- The Secret
- Tombs

Notes: The following bands were also booked but did not play: Broken Teeth, Cro-Mags, Decortica, Harm's Way, Merauder, Pound for Pound, SFA, Wisdom in Chains and Withdrawal.

=== February 18, 2012: Ieper Hardcore Fest Winter Edition ===
Location: JOC 't Perron, Fochlaan 1, 8900, Ypres, Belgium.

==== Saturday, February 18 ====
- Deafheaven
- Doom
- Hierophant
- Integrity
- Kingdom
- No Turning Back
- Rot in Hell
- Vanna
- Vicious
- Wrong Answer

Notes: The following bands were also booked but did not play: Goodtime Boys and Pianos Become the Teeth.

=== August 10–12, 2012: Ieper Hardcore Fest ===
Location: Poperingseweg 153–161, 8908, Ypres, Belgium.

==== Thursday, August 9 ====
- 6 Days of Justice
- Countdown
- DRS (headliners)
- The Gohards

Notes: This was a charged pre-festival concert held at the Marquee Stage at Ieperfer.

==== Friday, August 10 ====
===== Main Stage =====
- Agnostic Front (headliners)
- Corrosion of Conformity
- Crown of Thornz
- Death by Stereo
- Funeral for a Friend
- Knuckledust
- Kylesa
- Midnight Souls
- Norma Jean
- Take Offense
- The Mongoloids

===== Marquee Stage =====
- Aborted
- Coke Bust
- Congress (headliners)
- Dukatalon
- For the Glory
- Homer
- Mucky Pup
- Skarhead
- The Chariot

==== Saturday, August 11 ====
===== Main Stage =====
- Cornered
- Ignite
- Reign Supreme
- Sick of It All (headliners)
- Still Strong
- The Black Dahlia Murder
- Trapped Under Ice
- TRC
- Truth and Its Burden
- Unearth
- Your Demise

===== Marquee Stage =====
- Eyehategod
- Grand Magus
- Hellbastard
- MxPx Allstars
- Nasum
- No Second Thought
- Pianos Become the Teeth
- Pig Destroyer (headliners)
- Scraps
- Vaccine
- Whatever It Takes

==== Sunday, August 12 ====
===== Main Stage =====
- 7 Seconds
- Bolt Thrower (headliners)
- Brutality Will Prevail
- Converge
- Crowbar
- Cruel Hands
- Deez Nuts
- Naysayer
- Terror
- The Cold Harbour

===== Marquee Stage =====
- A Strength Within
- Cattle Decapitation
- Darkest Hour (headliners)
- Deformity
- Incantation
- Nemea
- Rise and Fall
- Set Your Goals
- The Death of Anna Karina
- Toxic Holocaust

Notes: The following bands were also booked but did not play: Balance and Composure, Dean Dirg, D.O.A., Here Comes the Kraken, Man VS Humanity, Omega Massif, Shai Hulud, Sydney Ducks, This Is Hell, Wisdom in Chains and Withdrawal.
