= Uxfest =

Charity festival in England

- Genre: Heavy metal
- Dates: August
- Locations: Fountains Mill, Uxbridge, England; Islington Academy, London, England
- Years active: 1997–2006
- Website: uxfest.org* *no longer operational

Uxfest was a charity festival held in Uxbridge, England from 1997 to 2004 and then in Islington, London, England in 2006. It was organised and run by the local youth centre, Fountain's Mill. Bands received no payment for performing although they did receive a contribution towards petrol costs. Notable bands who played at the Uxfest include Lostprophets, Raging Speedhorn, Stampin' Ground and Knuckledust.

== History ==
The first Uxfest took place in 1997 following in the Fountain's Mill Youth Club tradition of yearly festivals supported by the council and run by the Youth Club. The central idea was to have a scheme run "By young people, for young people". Organised and run by a team of Fountains Mill members together with youth workers, the Mill manager and a small council budget, historically the festivals provided work experience, opportunities and entertainment for everyone, and were always a good laugh, Uxfest followed with the same idea.

Uxfest was born in 1997 at Fountain's Mill by a team of heavy metal fans - Paul, Rob, Steve, Sarah and Russell and Mill manager Dick Sable. They were all enthusiastic and willing to work and they created the blueprint for what the Uxfest became. In 1997 all proceeds from the event went to the Hillingdon Aids Response Trust.

Festivals run from Fountain's Mill were always charity events, as a condition of the entertainment license. The budget being so small, they never really had money to pay bands, and although in the first year The Blood Divine were paid some whacking great amount like £600, no band was ever paid thereafter, apart from a contribution to travel expenses. The rule of No Payment and £50 maximum expenses was instated in 1998 by Sarah Jackson and Talita Jenman who thereafter took over the running and organisation of Uxfest together with Dick Sable. Otherwise, as was found in 1997 very little money was made for charity (£490).

As government policy changed, funding changed and so did funding categories. Uxfest was funded as a festival, then as a Summer project, then, when the council money fell through, as a training scheme funded by the Big Lottery.

In 2005 the festival was postponed due to Hillingdon council renovation work at the Fountain's Mill site. As the festival was unable to take place but the young people were still keen, Talita and Dick Sable took a large number of young people to work at FuryFest in Le Mans, France instead. The volunteers learnt French for six months and were then given various roles across the French festival (that later turned into Hellfest). The plan was always to return to run the festival again from 2006 back at a new renovated Fountain's Mill. However the obstacles in running Uxfest from Fountains Mill grew insurmountable with the local council and so the decision was taken to move the festival into central London as a final goodbye. At this point Talita, Kirsty Moore and Sara Allen, the festival organisers, saw the costs of running the festival mount up. Previously they had enjoyed their own venue, so insurance, meetings, lightbulbs, maintenance, etc. was always covered. Now these were additional costs to factor into running the festival from a new location. The Islington Academy was chosen as the venue with a limited set of 21 bands over two stages. The spirit of the festival was kept alive with several key principles, two stages, young people volunteers, bands playing for free, making money for charity.

The 2006 event was a success at the new venue although it made a lot less money for charity than the previous Uxfest it was still profitable for the chosen charities. The plan was to continue at the new venue for 2007 however in the wake of the success of more commercially orientated festivals, like Download and the dwindling funding from local government and other sources the decision was made not to stage the event in 2007.

At present it is unclear if the festival will ever return. Especially in the format it originated in.

== Festival Line Ups ==
=== 1997 ===
The Blood Divine, Medulla Nocte, Scarabaeus, Hatred, Sanctum, Epitome, Shrike, Singuia, T.B.A.C., Gromoxin 100, Suffering, Baby Eater, Roadkill, Godzilla.

=== 1998 ===
Knuckledust, King Prawn, Stampin' Ground, Cynical Smile, Dog Toffee, Speedurchin, Jnr. Loaded, Deadbolt, Lozt Prophetz, Medulla Nocte, Epitome, Snub, T.B.A.C, Sick on the Bus, Evil Knevil, Touchdown, 3rd Stone, Diatribe, Spin Pit, Singuia, Suffering, Fatal Reality, Cachorro, Method of Murder, Dust to Dust, Needlebliss, Animated Sand Castles, H Breed.

note: this was an early appearance by the band Lostprophets before they changed the spelling of their name to how they are known today.

=== 1999 ===
Assert, Imbalace, Capdown, Entwined, In Dying Grace, Labrat, 17 Stitches, The Enchanted, Miocene, Otherwise, Loztprophetz, Vanilla Pod, Set Against, T.B.A.C., Special Move, Brutal Deluxe, Doku Dango, Cowpunche, Sloth, Frowser, Singuia, 7 Air, Samkdaddi, Inimenter, Ligature, Morose, Bloodstream.

note: the band Lostprophets had changed their name since their appearance at the festival the previous year, but still not changed the spelling of their name to how they are known today.

=== 2000 ===
King Prawn, Raging Speedhorn, Medulla Nocte, Capdown, Miocene, Brutal Deluxe, Sanctum, Vacant Stare, Kane, BDF, PDHM, Latch, Anal Beard, Redhed, Lowlife, Vicious Rumours, Lightyear, Captain Everything, 7 Air, Sikth, Dash-k, A-Ko, Ja Crew, Cowpuncher, Inner Rage, Descent, Systemised, Razor Wire, Solace Denied.

Note: Lostprophets (now spelling their name as they are known today) were booked for the festival but did not make it after their van broke down on the way.

=== 2001 ===
Lostprophets, Brutal Deluxe, Onedice, PDHM, Lightyear, Jesse James, Sanctum, Evil Knievel, Autonomy, BDF, MTA, Silent Season, Anal Beard, Glueball, Sikth, MTN, Inner Rage, Descent, Shellshock, Whizzwood, Torna-k, A-Ko, Thirty Seconds Til Armageddon, Fruit Tree, Kaowin, Razorwire, Pensilnek, Miss:spelt Yoof, Pan-k

=== 2002 ===
Vacant Stare, Sikth, Sanctum, Torna-K, Number One Son, PDHM, Labrat, Stoopi, Palehorse, Tribute to Nothing, Area 54, thisGIRL, -16-, A-ko, Fony, 50 Caliber, Subvert, Whitmore, Shellshock, Twofold, Twoday Rule, Anal Beard, K-Line, <209>, Zero Cipher, Rejects, Supertrix, Something in the Water, Left Side Brain, Fog Donkey, Blind To The Fact, Gorilla Monsoon.

=== 2003 ===
Sikth, PDHM, Electric Eel Shock, Aconite Thrill, Johnny Truant, JOR, The Blueprint, Hiding With Girls, Frowser, Twoday Rule, 17 Stitches, Ako, Kenisia, Project Abner, SiZE, Beecher, Lamb Quartet, Dopamine, Joski, coMA Kai, Needleye, Blind Eye Policy, Fog Donkey, Fourway Kill, My Pet Junkie, The Mirrormen, Severed State, Planet of Women, One Man Down, Lost for Words.

=== 2004 ===
The 2004 festival took place at Fountain's Mill on 4 August 2004.

Outdoor Stage	Indoor Stage
Stampin' Ground; My Deaf Audio; Aconite Thrill; Hiding Place <209> HFM; Hitechjet; Left Side Brain; Mumrah coMa Kai; Blind Eye Policy; Unsing Hero; Hacksaw	Knuckledust; Eden Maine; Decimate; JOR; Burning Skies; Head On; Zero Cipher; Days of Grace; No Warning Shot; Sada; Exhibit A Enemy Within; Without Cause; Cry Debris

=== 2005 ===
Canceled due to venue refurbishment.

=== 2006 ===
The 2006 festival took place at Islington Academy on 6 August 2006.

Mill Stage	Main Stage
Murder One; Fireapple Red; B Movie Heroe; Architects; The Blackout; Mumrah; Inner rage OutCryFire; Sylosis; No Warning Shot	Skindred; Biomechanical; King Size Blues; Exit Ten; Engel; Head On; PDHM; Forever Never; Eths; Shellshock; Profane

Notes: Captain Everything were originally booked to play, but replaced on the bill by The Blackout.
