= Javier Casas =

Javier Casas may refer to:

- Javier Casas (footballer, born 1982), Spanish retired footballer
- Javier Casas (musician), record producer and member of the Argentine bank Nueva Ética
- Javier Casas (soccer, born 2003), American professional soccer player
