= Bei Ru =

Armenian-American music producer and composer

- Born: Baruir Panossian; Los Angeles, California
- Occupations: Musician, Vocalist, Producer, Composer
- Website: http://www.beirumusic.com

Baruir Panossian, known professionally as Bei Ru, is an American record producer, singer, songwriter, and multi-instrumentalist. Bei Ru's sound is marked by a melding of airy, syrupy electronic, soul, psych, house & funk influences.

In addition to his solo work, he scored music for the 2014 film A Girl Walks Home Alone At Night, an Iranian vampire western produced by Elijah Wood and distributed by Vice Films, as well as 2015's I Smile Back starring Sarah Silverman and others.

== Early life ==
Baruir Panossian was born in Los Angeles to Armenian parents who immigrated from Lebanon.

== Career ==
2010: L.A. (Little Armenia)

Bei Ru first made waves with his 2010 debut Little Armenia (L.A.). Composed with samples culled from vintage Armenian music and influenced by Los Angeles’ underground hip-hop scene, it was a love letter to both his heritage and his hometown. The album gained cult popularity.

2014: Saturday Night At The Magic Lamp

Bei Ru's second album Saturday Night At The Magic Lamp was released in November 2014. It took Bei Ru three years to complete his sophomore album. Indeed, "Saturday Night at the Magic Lamp" was an ambitious project for the San Fernando Valley-raised producer. Bei Ru estimates that he had about 100 songs that could potentially land on an album, but he didn't have a concept. In the end, Bei Ru found his concept. "Saturday Night at the Magic Lamp" is inspired by a record from an Armenian bandleader that included banter bits that welcomed guests to "the Magic Lamp." On Bei Ru's album, the Magic Lamp became a venue whose place is hard to pinpoint. "You don't know if it's from the future or the past," he says. "It really made sense to me because the music itself seemed like it was otherworldly, from some other dimension, like there were futuristic influences and vintage influences and it seemed like it would be a really cool way to present it as a night at some club from somewhere that doesn't exist."

2016: LA ZOOO

LA ZOOO, Bei Ru's 3rd album, was released on October 7, 2016, via the record label Fat Beats. Exploring new sounds, Bei Ru places his beats over psychedelic jazz samples and funky harmonic melodies. It's an ode to some of his favorite artists, genres and styles of music fused with his experiences growing up and living in Los Angeles, driven by electronic/Moog records from the '60s-'70s.

2020: Pomegranate Juice

In March 2020, Pomegranate Juice was released as an instrumental precursor to his upcoming vocal-infused album Custom Made Life.

2020: Custom Made Life

Custom Made Life was released on October 16, 2020. In addition to producing, mixing, and almost entirely self- recording the album, Bei Ru also sang on the album and collaborated with vocalists such as Roc Marciano, Seven Davis Jr., Peyton, Jimetta Rose, Blu, Old Man Saxon, and Sebu of Capital Cities. Stylistically, it combined elements of funk, melodic house, hazy, filtered lo-fi electronic, grainy hip hop, and more.
