= Saved by Fear =

Saved By Fear

Studio album by Dukatalon
- Released: November 16, 2010
- Recorded: June 2008 at Roco Studios, Indianapolis, IN, U.S.
- Genres: Sludge metal, doom metal
- Length: 46:11
- Label: Relapse
- Producers: Zafrir Tzori, Yariv Shilo

Saved By Fear is the first full-length studio album by Israeli doom/sludge metal trio Dukatalon, released on November 16, 2010, and on iTunes on December 14, 2010. The album was originally released in Israel in a small print in 2009.

The album was recorded by the band as a two-piece, with Zafrir Tzori handling all vocals, guitars and bass duties, and Yariv Shilo on drums and percussion.

Many compared the album's music to that of Eyehategod and Gojira.

== Critical reception ==
JJ Koczan of The Aquarian described the album as "emotionally-driven and viscerally heavy."

== Track listing ==
No.	Title	Length
1.	"Peis"	6:24
2.	"Run"	5:09
3.	"Zx"	6:23
4.	"Vagabond"	5:41
5.	"Saved By Fear"	3:26
6.	"Electric Site"	9:09
7.	"Gate of Mind"	6:08
8.	"Mekonenet"	4:31

== Personnel ==
- Zafrir Tzori - lead vocals, guitar, bass
- Yariv Shilo - drums, percussion

Production

- Billy Anderson - audio mixing
- Ilan Hilel - engineering
