= A Girl Walks Home Alone at Night =

2014 film by Ana Lily Amirpour

- Theatrical release poster
- Persian: دختری در شب تنها به خانه می‌رود
- Directed by: Ana Lily Amirpour
- Written by: Ana Lily Amirpour
- Produced by: Sina Sayya; Justin Begnaud; Ana Lily Amirpour
- Starring: Sheila Vand; Arash Marandi; Mozhan Marnò; Dominic Rains; Milad Eghbali; Rome Shadanloo; Marshall Manesh
- Cinematography: Lyle Vincent
- Edited by: Alex O'Flinn
- Music by: Bei Ru
- Production companies: SpectreVision; Logan Pictures; Black Light District; Say Ahh Productions
- Distributed by: Kino Lorber; Vice Films
- Release dates: January 20, 2014 (Sundance); November 21, 2014 (United States)
- Running time: 101 minutes
- Country: United States
- Language: Persian
- Box office: $628,000

A Girl Walks Home Alone at Night (Persian: دختری در شب تنها به خانه می‌رود Dokhtari dar šab tanhâ be xâne miravad) is a 2014 Persian-language horror Western film written and directed by Ana Lily Amirpour and produced in the United States. Promoted as "The first Iranian vampire Western", it stars Sheila Vand, Arash Marandi, Mozhan Marnò, Marshall Manesh, and Dominic Rains. It was financed in part by a crowdfunding campaign on Indiegogo.

A Girl Walks Home Alone at Night takes place in "the Iranian ghost-town Bad City" and depicts the doings of "a lonesome vampire". It was filmed in Taft, California, in black-and-white. It was chosen to show in the "Next" program of the 2014 Sundance Film Festival.

== Plot ==
A hard-working young Iranian man named Arash lives with and takes care of his heroin-addicted father, Hossein. They are harassed by a ruthless, drug-dealing pimp named Saeed, who seizes the young man's prized car in exchange for money the father owes him. In a crime of opportunity, Arash steals a pair of diamond earrings from the wealthy young woman he works for, Shaydah.

Saeed comes across a strange young woman in a chador at night. She persuades Saeed to take her back to his apartment. While there, she grows long fangs and first bites off his finger, then goes for his neck, killing him. As she leaves, she passes by Arash, who has come to offer the earrings for his car. He finds Saeed dead, and takes back his car keys along with a suitcase of drugs and cash. Arash decides to sell the drugs, allowing him to quit his job working for Shaydah. Later, he goes to a costume party at a nightclub dressed up as Dracula, where he is persuaded by Shaydah into taking one of the ecstasy pills he is selling. Under the influence, he becomes disoriented, and ends up lost at night on the street.

The woman with the chador spends her time listening to music alone in her apartment, skateboarding, or bedeviling pedestrians at night, until she comes across the lost Arash. He shows vulnerability and compassion, and she takes him to her home, where they listen to music, and she resists his exposed neck. They meet the next night, and she says that he does not know the terrible things she has done. He is unfazed, gives her the earrings and, at her request, pierces her ears with a safety pin, but she eventually leaves.

Atti, a prostitute who worked for Saeed, is followed at night by the woman, and they retreat to the prostitute's apartment. The woman gives Atti the payment Saeed owed her. They have a conversation during which the woman realizes that Atti no longer remembers what it is to desire. She leaves.

Suffering from heroin withdrawal, Hossein has an episode where he believes that Arash's cat is his dead wife. Infuriated by his father, Arash gives him drugs and money and throws him out, telling him to take the cat with him. Hossein goes to Atti and forces her to take heroin with him. They are found by the woman, who kills Hossein. After Atti helps her dispose of Hossein's body, she tells the woman to take the cat and leave.

The following morning, Arash discovers Hossein's body. Distressed, he runs to the woman's apartment and begs her to run away with him. As she is gathering up her things, the cat appears and Arash realizes that she had something to do with his father's death. Arash and the woman drive off together, but he pulls off to the side of the road, unsure about what to do. He eventually gets back in the car and the two continue their trip onwards.

== Cast ==
- Sheila Vand as The Girl
- Arash Marandi as Arash
- Mozhan Marnò as Atti
- Marshall Manesh as Hossein
- Dominic Rains as Saeed
- Milad Eghbali as the street urchin
- Rome Shadanloo as Shaydah
- Masuka as the cat

== Themes ==
Director Ana Lily Amirpour, regarding the mythology of the vampire, has stated that: "A vampire is so many things: serial killer, a romantic, a historian, a drug addict – they're sort of all these things in one." The film examines these facets of a vampire as described by Amirpour in a variety of ways.

The film's protagonist, The Girl, can be seen as an antihero vigilante with a taste for bad men. As a vampire, she is able to roam the streets at night without being concerned for her safety, subverting the implications of the film's title. She is the perpetrator and possesses agency and power atypical of a young woman, especially in a crime-ridden urban setting such as Bad City. In this sense, the film has feminist leanings.

Rockabilly, a gender-bending, minor background character who exists on the fringe of Bad City throughout the duration of the movie, acts as a silent observer to the events around them. Director Amirpour states, "If there's one political thing [in the film], it's not the chador, it's Rockabilly, because it's not okay to be gay in Iran."

== Production ==
An early short film with the same title from Amirpour screened at festivals and won Best Short Film at the Noor Iranian Film Festival.

An Indiegogo campaign was launched in July 2012 to fund the feature-length version of the film. On August 27, 2012, the campaign's goal of $55,000 was surpassed. The project ended up with a total sum of $56,903 raised by 290 backers.

A Girl Walks Home Alone at Night was shot over the course of twenty-four days, in the town of Taft in Kern County in Southern California. This allowed Amirpour to not be constrained by the restrictions of filming in Iran, which include having to obtain a filming permit and facing content censorship, such as the prohibition of almost all depictions of physical romantic love.

The film premiered at the Sundance Film Festival on January 20, 2014.

In an interview with MovieMaker, Amirpour spoke regarding her relationship with filmmaking:

People ask me, "Why did you make A Girl Walks Home Alone at Night?" My answer is that I was lonely—that's why. But taking that a step further, the truth is that I make films to make friends and find real intimacy; a connection with others based on something that's meaningful to me. The people who make these films with you, your cast and crew—it's like they're on a vision quest with you. That is an incomparable experience. And then when the film is done and out there, the people who are attracted to your film—the audiences, festivals that embrace it, other filmmakers, artists, the critics who like what you do—those are my friends. And I don't expect to be friends with everyone.

Amirpour is a lifelong skater, and was a stand-in for the skateboarding sequences present in the film.

== Style ==
The film is directed and imagined by Amirpour with cinematography by Lyle Vincent. Its style is clearly inspired by Spaghetti Westerns like those of Sergio Leone, featuring a mysterious, lone, antihero with a vigilante streak. However, the genre is reimagined with a female lead, and is a hybrid spaghetti Western-vampire film. As a vampire film it serves as an homage to its legacy of predecessors especially the 1922 German Expressionist film Nosferatu. Echoes of the film are seen in the choice of shooting in black-and-white, the use of shadows, and the minimal dialogue. The film's dialogue is entirely in Persian, and the film blends elements of Iranian culture with the spaghetti Western-vampire imagery described above.

The film was shot digitally with anamorphic lenses, which Amirpour and Vincent selected in an effort to emphasize the bleak, otherworldly atmosphere of the film.

Amirpour has stated that graphic novels are a major source of inspiration for her. The visual language of the film is not unlike that of a comic book, with its "high-contrast monochrome aesthetic". Additionally, Bad City, the fictional location in which the film is set, may perhaps be a nod to Frank Miller's Sin City.

Amirpour has said that she had her actors watch Nosferatu and many spaghetti Westerns in preparation for their roles.

She has also said that "every piece of the story, every character, every costume, every bit of music" is something that she "love[s] to the point of obsession."

== Soundtrack ==
No.	Title	Artist	Length
1.	"Charkhesh e Pooch"	Kiosk	2:23
2.	"Gelaye"	Radio Tehran	3:43
3.	"Sarcophagus"	Federale	8:34
4.	"Dancing girls"	Farah	5:35
5.	"Bashy"	Free Electric Band	5:14
6.	"Black Sunday"	Federale	3:58
7.	"Hishe Ayn Ore (Remember That Day?)"	Bei Ru	2:52
8.	"Bread Thief"	Bei Ru	3:00
9.	"Death (album version)"	White Lies	5:00
10.	"Sisyphus"	Federale	4:14
11.	"Khabnama"	Radio Tehran	6:33
12.	"Thirsty's Return"	Federale	3:26
13.	"Cheshme Man"	Dariush	4:54
14.	"Tatilat"	Radio Tehran	5:40
15.	"Yarom Bia"	Kiosk	4:31
16.	"The Veil"	Bei Ru	3:52
17.	"Tribe"	Federale	4:25

A limited-edition vinyl pressing of the soundtrack, and accompanying album art, was released by Death Waltz Records in January 2014.

== Reception ==
The film received positive reviews from critics. On the review aggregator website Rotten Tomatoes, the film holds an approval rating of 96% based on 134 reviews, with an average rating of 8/10. The website's critics consensus reads, "A Girl Walks Home Alone at Night blends conventional elements into something brilliantly original – and serves as a striking calling card for writer-director Ana Lily Amirpour." Metacritic, which uses a weighted average, assigned the film a score of 81 out of 100, based on 28 critics, indicating "universal acclaim".

Guy Lodge of Variety said in his review that "Ana Lily Amirpour's auspicious debut feature is a sly, slinky vampire romance set in an imaginary Iranian underworld". Andrew O'Hehir of Salon called the film "the year's biggest discovery" and praised its feminist themes. Boyd van Hoeij, in his review for The Hollywood Reporter, praised the film, saying "this moody and gorgeous film is finally more about atmosphere and emotions than narrative – and none the worse for it". Drew Taylor of IndieWire graded the film A− and said that it gives "the impression that you're witnessing something iconic and important unfold before you".

== Adaptations ==
The film was adapted into a six-part graphic novel series published by Radco in 2014. The series explores The Girl's backstory with art from Michael DeWeese.

Belgian band the Black Heart Rebellion created an alternative soundtrack for the film, played it live several times with the film screening in the background and released it as an album in 2018.
