= With Triumph Comes Loss =

Studio album by Cataract
- Released: September 7, 2004
- Recorded: March 2004 at Antfarm Studios, Denmark
- Genre: Metalcore
- Length: 38:54
- Label: Metal Blade
- Producer: Tue Madsen and Cataract

Cataract chronology
| Great Days of Vengeance (2003) | With Triumph Comes Loss (2004) | Kingdom (2006) |

Professional ratings
Review scores
| Source | Rating |
|---|---|
| AllMusic | 3.5/5 stars |
| KNAC | 4/5 stars |

With Triumph Comes Loss is the third full-length release from the Swiss metalcore band Cataract, and also their first album signed to Metal Blade Records.

== Track listing ==
1. "Killing Tool"
2. "Nothing's Left"
3. "Vanished in the Dark"
4. "Skies Grow Black"
5. "As We Speak"
6. "Godevil"
7. "Fuel"
8. "Reborn From Fire"
9. "Saving Shelter"
10. "Hallow Horns"
11. "With Triumph Comes Loss"

== Personnel ==
- Federico Carminitana - vocals
- Simon Füllemann - guitar
- Greg Mäder - guitar
- Michael Henggeler - bass
- Ricky Dürst - drums
