= Newborn (band) =

Hungarian hardcore punk band

- Origin: Budapest, Hungary
- Genres: Hardcore punk, metallic hardcore
- Years active: 1998–2002
- Labels: Erdkampf Records (Austria); CrimethInc. (United States); Scorched Earth Policy (Germany); Join The Team Player (Germany); Turnstile
- Past members: Zoltán Jakab; Ádám Fellegi; Tibor Szalkai; Máté Ács; Gábor Nagy; Szabolcs Németh
- Website: On MySpace

Newborn was a Hungarian hardcore punk band with progressive metal influences, formed in Budapest, Hungary. The band was active from 1998 to 2002.

== History ==
Newborn was formed from Hungarian bands Other Side and Burning Inside. They were one of the most hardworking D.I.Y. bands from the Hungarian hardcore scene in Europe. Two band members simultaneously played in the band called Dawncore. The vocalist Zoltán Jakab worked as a concert organizer, to bring the most respected hardcore bands in Hungary, as he does currently. In Europe The German Scorched Earth Policy, in the US the CrimethInc. has released they last mini split album the Ready to Leave, Ready to Live contributing with the American band Catharsis from North Carolina, where four Newborn songs have taken place and Catharsis has had the song "Arsonist's Prayer". In 2002 the group disbanded. Zoltán Jakab left to the Bridge To Solace, the rest of the members created a new band called The Idoru.
The farewell gig was held in the Trafó Klub Gödöllő on 18 October 2002.

On 25 October 2008 they did a charity concert to help they ill friend in the club Dürer Kert in Budapest with the groups: Burning Inside, The Taktika, Fallen Into Ashes, Hold X True, Penalty Kick, Zero Tolerance and the Spadeful of Dust.

== Band members ==
- Zoltán Jakab – vocals
- Ádám Fellegi – drums
- Tibor Szalkai – guitar
- Máté Ács – bass
- Szabolcs Németh – guitar (1999–2000)
- Gábor Nagy – guitar (2000–2002)

== Discography ==
The band hasn't released a full-length studio album yet. The Mini CDs and EPs was distributed by independent labels in various countries and/or fans were spreading them.

- Darkened Room (EP, 1999)
- In These Desperate Days...We Still Strive for Freedom (MCD, 1999)
- In These Desperate Days...We Still Strive for Freedom (MCD, re-release + 1 bonus 2000)
- Newborn & Catharsis – Ready to Leave, Ready to Live (split, 2001)
