= Amenra =

Belgian metal band

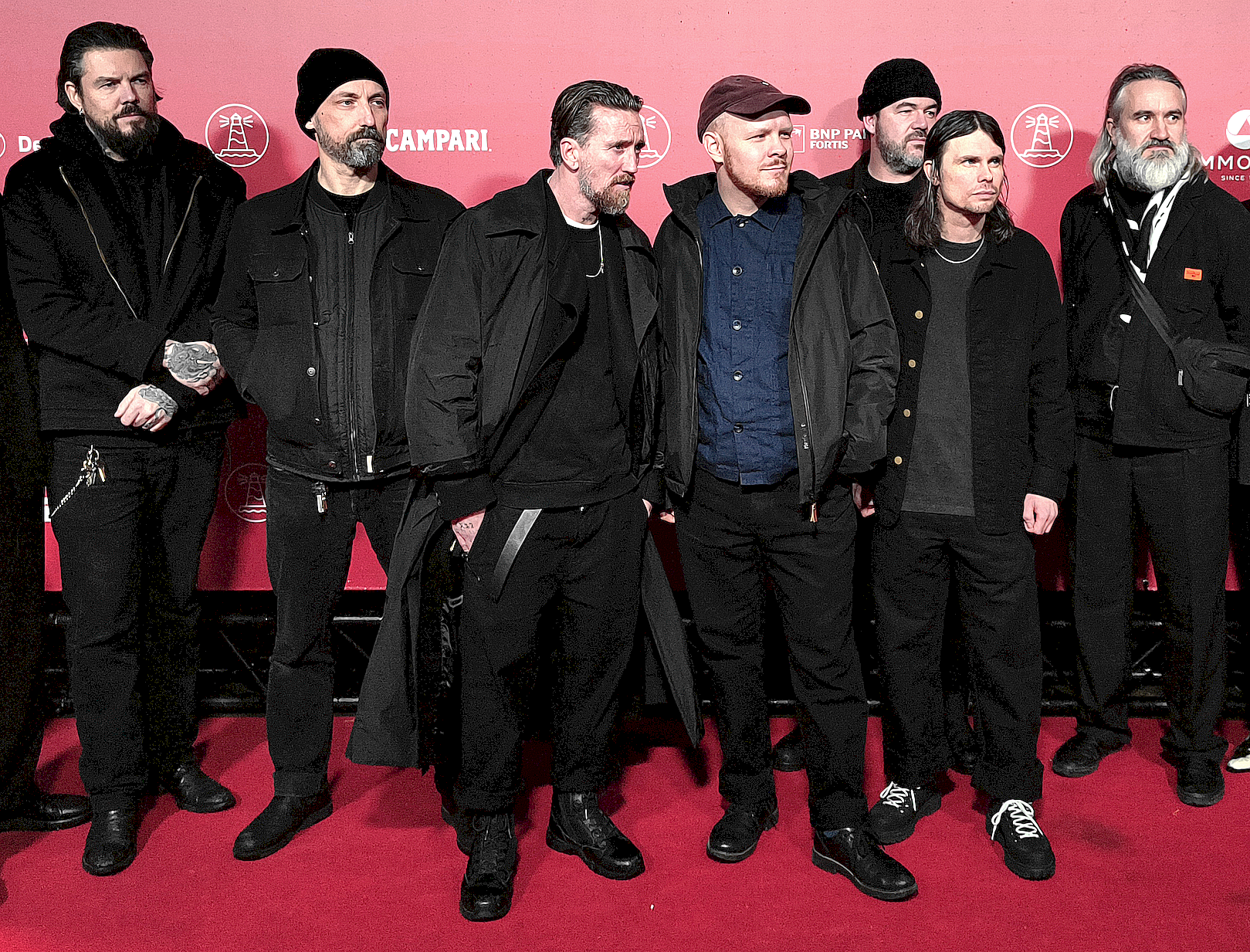
- Amenra in 2026

Background information
- Origin: Kortrijk, West Flanders, Belgium
- Genre: Post-metal
- Years active: 1999–present
- Labels: Relapse; Neurot; Consouling Sounds; Hypertension
- Spinoffs: Church of Ra, Sembler Deah, Harlowe, Caan, Darak, Absent in Body, Eyes of Another, Oathbreaker
- Spinoff of: Spineless
- Members: Colin H. van Eeckhout; Mathieu Vandekerckhove; Bjorn Lebon; Lennart Bossu; Amy Tung Barrysmith
- Past members: Kristof Mondy; Maarten Kinet; Vincent Tetaert; Levy Seynaeve; Caro Tanghe; Tim De Gieter
- Website: churchofra.com; ritualofra.com

Amenra is a Belgian post-metal band from Kortrijk. It was formed in 1999 by vocalist Colin H. van Eeckhout and guitarist Mathieu Vandekerckhove, who now perform alongside drummer Bjorn Lebon, guitarist Lennart Bossu and bassist Amy Tung Barrysmith. Among a number of other works, they have released six studio albums in the Mass series, the latest of them through Neurot Recordings. The band's sixth album De Doorn debuted at No. 3 in Belgium.

The band's unique musical style, characterised by brooding atmospheres and spiritual intensity, is rooted in doom metal, hardcore punk and post-rock. Their live performances, accompanied by visual art, have been described as "entrancing communions". In 2005, Amenra formed Church of Ra, a collective of collaborating artists which now includes Oathbreaker and the Black Heart Rebellion.

== History ==
Amenra was formed in 1999 in the West Flanders city of Kortrijk. It was founded by vocalist Colin H. van Eeckhout, lead guitarist Mathieu Vandekerckhove and bassist Kristof Mondy. The three had been in the hardcore punk band Spineless that split up in 1999 and wanted to create music with more "heart and soul".

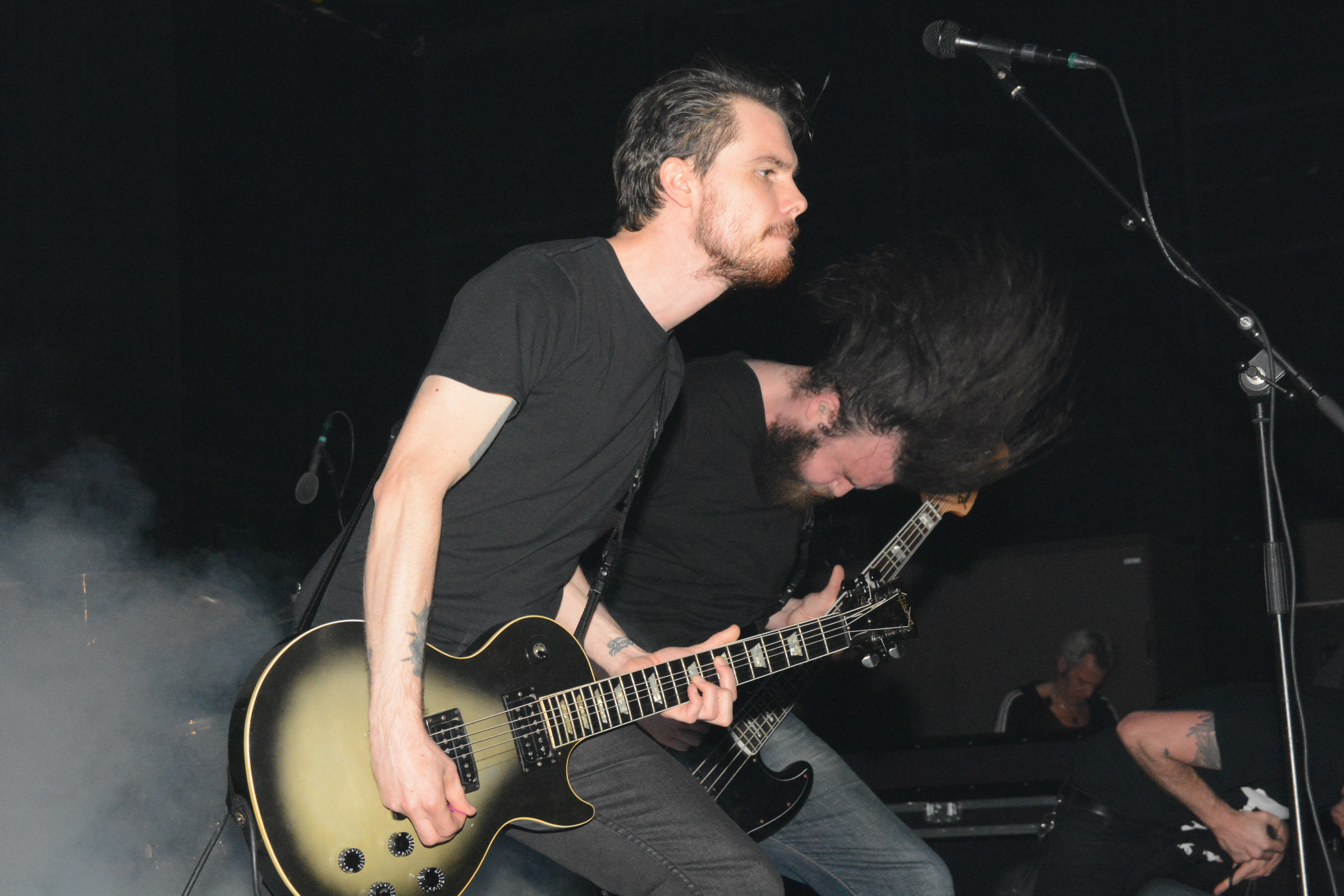
Amenra live in November 2013

The group released their debut studio album Mass I in 2003. Van Eeckhout suggested in 2017 that each Mass is created out of necessity to reflect on a certain experience or phase in the band members' lives and thus they never know which album will be their last. He also described 2005's Mass III as a "keystone moment of [Amenra's] existence" at which they "found direction". The band's next "turning point" came when they joined Neurot Records to release Mass V. The label was founded by Neurosis; a band that has been influential in Amenra's style and career. Produced by Billy Anderson, Mass V has received moderately positive reviews from critics.

Amenra's fourth album Mass VI was released in 2017 and became the band's first to enter the Belgian Album Chart, at No. 19.

For the band's fifth album De Doorn, released in 2021, Oathbreaker lead singer Caro Tanghe contributed as an additional vocalist. De Doorn entered the Belgian Album Chart at number three, behind only Camille Dhont and Olivia Rodrigo. It also charted at No. 68 in Germany. It was the band's first album on the American label Relapse Records. It was also the band's first album to feature lyrics sung entirely in Dutch, specifically the Flemish dialect.

In August 2021, professional wrestler Malakai Black began using Amenra's song "Ogentroost" as his entrance theme in All Elite Wrestling.

On 28 March 2025, Amenra released two EPs, De Toorn and Of Fang and Claw, on Relapse Records. From 26 to 30 March 2025, Amenra played five consecutive sold-out shows at the 2,000-capacity Ancienne Belgique in Brussels.

== Style ==
Remfry Dedman of The Independent wrote that the band's "avant-garde post-metal" music "push[es] the boundaries of extreme music by being heavy in practically every conceivable way; sonically, emotionally and spiritually." Metal Hammer's Matt Mills said the band performed "their post-metal hymns" in London in 2023. Amenra's live shows are known for their intensity and heavy themes. It has been said that "An Amenra concert has an emotional charge that is just as heavy as a funeral." During performances, van Eeckhout has pierced his skin with meat hooks and hung stones from them, leaving scars on his body and blood visible to the audience.

Though calling himself agnostic, Colin H. van Eeckhout acknowledges the presence of spirituality and religion in the band's work. Shortly before the release of Mass VI, he wrote for The Independent:

We have one story to tell and it is always the same. I always write about life's pain. I always use personal experiences as a reference to relate as truthfully and as honestly possible, from the heart. I try to bend the darkness into the light. ... From the beginning, our intention with the Mass albums was to devise a platform for self-reflection, to set a base for introspection; that moment when you're on your knees and you ask questions that don't have answers.

Van Eeckhout's nipples were surgically removed. They were encased in transparent resin and ornamental silver with the intent of giving one each to both of his two sons.

Amenra often collaborate with visual artists and choreographers, including Willy Vanderperre and Berlinde De Bruyckere.

== Church of Ra ==
Around the release of Mass III in 2005, Amenra founded a collective of like-minded artists named Church of Ra. It includes friends who share a DIY ethic, collaborating on various artistic projects. In a 2014 interview, van Eeckhout traced the development of the collective:

We started working together in different projects with Amenra and sideprojects Kingdom [including van Eeckhout and Vandekerckhove], Syndrome [Vandekerckhove's solo project], etc. When Lennart Bossu [of the band Firestone] (guitars) and Levy Seynaeve [of the band Black Haven] (bass) joined Amenra, Oathbreaker [including Bossu] and Hessian [Seynaeve] got formed. We worked together with Tomas Lootens and Valentijn Goethals from Webecameaware for layouts artwork etc, they are also in The Black Heart Rebellion. Treha Sektori from Paris also works with us a lot. I started talking to him in 2009, and soon thereafter we formed Sembler Deah [van Eeckhout, Vandekerckhove]. New projects CHVE [van Eeckhout's solo project], Harlowe [van Eeckhout, Bossu], Caan [van Eeckhout, Vandekerckhove], Darak [van Eeckhout, Vandekerckhove], Wiegedood [Oathbreaker members] are being formed. Through the years photographers like Stefaan Temmerman, Jeroen Mylle, Thomas Sweertvaegher worked with us as well, dancer choreographer Thomas Steyaert, visual artist/graphic designer Tine Guns and so much more.

One recurring musician in the collective is Tim Bryon, the drummer of Kingdom, Hessian, and the Black Heart Rebellion. In 2015, Vandekerckhove formed Absent in Body with Scott Kelly of Neurosis, joined in 2016 by van Eeckhout; they released one single, "The Abyss Stares Back – Vol. V", in 2017. In 2020, van Eeckhout and Bossu released the single "A Faint Young Sun" with techno DJ Gianmarco Cellini, as Eyes of Another. In 2021, Caro Tanghe of Oathbreaker joined Amenra and contributed vocals to the album De Doorn.

== Members ==
=== Current members ===
- Colin H. van Eeckhout – lead vocals (1999–present)
- Mathieu J. Vandekerckhove – lead guitar (1999–present)
- Bjorn J. Lebon – drums (1999–present)
- Lennart Bossu – rhythm guitar (2008–present)
- Amy Tung Barrysmith – bass (2025–present; touring musician 2024)

=== Former members ===
- Kristof J. Mondy – bass (1999–2006; touring musician 2009)
- Vincent F. Tetaert – rhythm guitar (2003–2008)
- Maarten Kinet – bass (2006–2012; touring musician 2014, 2024)
- Levy Seynaeve – bass (2012–2020)
- Tim De Gieter – bass, backing vocals (2020–2024; touring musician 2017–2020)
- Caro Tanghe – vocals (2021; touring musician 2009, 2012)

=== Former touring musicians ===
- Kristof J. Mondy – bass (2009)
- Gilles Demolder – rhythm guitar (2009)
- Thomas Vandingenen – percussion (2009)
- Maarten Kinet – bass (2014, 2024)
- Femke de Beleyr – violin (2014, 2024)
- Sofie Verdoodt – backing vocals (2014)
- Tim De Gieter – bass (2017–2020)
- Amy Tung Barrysmith – bass (2024)

== Discography ==
=== Studio albums ===
- Mass III (2005)
- Mass IIII (2008)
- Mass V (2012)
- Mass VI (2017)
- De Doorn (2021)
- Skunk (Original Motion Picture Soundtrack) (2024)

=== EPs ===
- Mass I: Prayer I-VI (2003)
- Prayers 9+10 (2004)
- Mass II: Sermons (2005)
- Afterlife (2009)
- Het Dorp / De Zotte Morgen (2020)
- De Toorn (2025)
- With Fang and Claw (2025)

=== Live albums ===
- Live (2012)
- Live II (2014)
- Alive (2016)
- Mass VI Live (2020)
- Acoustic Live (Vivid) (2020)
- Live at Dunk!2021 (2022)

=== Remixed albums ===
- De Doorn (Version 2) (2022)

=== Splits ===
- Vuur / Amenra 7" (2004)
- Vuur / Amenra / Gameness / Gantz CD (2004)
- Amenra / Hitch 7" (2007)
- Amenra / Hive Destruction 10" (2011)
- Amenra / The Black Heart Rebellion 12" (2011)
- Amenra / Oathbreaker 7" (2011)
- Amenra / Hessian 7" (2012)
- Amenra / Madensuyu 10" (2014)
- Amenra / VVOVNDS 12" (2014)
- Amenra / Eleanora 10" (2014)
- Amenra / Treha Sektori 10" (2014)
- Amenra / Sofie Verdoodt 7" (2015)
- Amenra / Raketkanon 7" (2017)
- Songs of Townes Van Zandt Vol. III" (Amenra, Marissa Nadler & Cave In) (2022)

=== Compilations ===
- The Cradle: Demos (2019)
- A Flood of Light: Soundtrack (2020)

=== DVDs ===
- Mass III (Hypertension Records pre-order special) (2005)
- Church of Ra (2009)
- 23.10 (2009)
- 01.06 (Fortarock 2013) (2013)
- 22.12 (Ancienne Belgique 2012) (2013)

=== Singles and music videos ===
- "Nowena 9|10" (2012)
- "Boden" (2012)
- "Amonâme" (2014)
- "Charon" (2016)
- "Children of the Eye" (2017)
- "A Solitary Reign" (2017)
- "Trahn" (2020)
- "The Summoning" (with Kreng) (2020)
- "Song to the Siren" (Tim Buckley cover) (2021)
- "De Evenmens" (2021)
- "Voor Immer" (2021)
- "Day is Done" (2021) (Nick Drake cover) (2021)
- "Roads" (2022) (Portishead cover) (2022)
- "Forlorn" (2025)
- "Heden" (2025)
- "De Toorn (Talisman)" (2025)
- "Salve Mater" (2025)

== Books ==
- Church of Ra (2008)
