= Dukatalon =

Israeli Metal Band

Dukalaton
- Origin: Tel Aviv, Israel
- Genres: Sludge metal, doom metal
- Years active: 2007–present
- Labels: Relapse
- Members: Zafrir Tzori; Yariv Shilo; Roy Ben Samuel
- Past members: Lior Mayer; Cavan; Eliya Gwetta
- Website: http://dukatalon.tumblr.com/

Dukatalon is an Israeli doom/sludge metal trio, formed in Tel Aviv, Israel in 2007. The band recorded and self-released their debut album Saved By Fear in 2009, which was re-released in 2010, once the band was signed to Relapse Records.

== History ==
=== Formation and beginning (2007–2008) ===
The band was formed as a sludge metal trio in 2007, by vocalist and guitarist Zafrir Tzori, drummer Yariv Shilo and bassist Cavan, all coming from very different musical backgrounds, playing in bands that varied from chillout/ambient, country and blues to post-punk and heavy metal.

Dukatalon started writing original material and performing around Israel right away, releasing a self-titled demo EP in 2007, and performing mostly within the hardcore punk and grindcore scene of Tel Aviv.

On June 14, 2008, the band performed alongside UK mathcore/grindcore band Trencher, in the Maximum Pain Festival, that took place at the Patiphone club in Tel Aviv, and featured many of Israel's punk, hardcore, grindcore and mathcore bands. Following the show, the band flew to the US to record their debut album at Roco Studios in Indianapolis, Indiana.

=== Saved By Fear (2008–present) ===
In May 2009, the band went on their first tour to Europe, after which they released their debut album Saved By Fear, which was self-released and distributed worldwide through the American label Sleeping Village Records, but printed in a very small volume. After the album was released, Cavan left the band and was replaced by Eliya Gwetta, who was later replaced by Lior Mayer.

In 2010, the band was signed by Relapse Records, and though the band remained inactive for most of the year, their album Saved By Fear was re-released on November 16, 2010, by Relapse Records, and on December 14, 2010 it appeared on iTunes.

In 2011, Dukatalon performed all over Israel, playing mostly small venues alongside bands such as Prey for Nothing (melodic death metal), Chains of Past Decisions (post-hardcore), Shreadhead (groove metal), Dirk Diggler (grindcore) and more. On November 24, 2011, the band opened for stoner rock trio Karma to Burn at the Levotin 7 club in Tel Aviv, Israel, and accompanied the American group on their Israeli Tour.

On September 5, 2011, it was announced that the band will be entering the studio to record another cover of the song "Mainline", originally by sludge metal veterans Buzzov*en, for a project entitled "Hell Comes Home". An earlier made cover recording of this song was originally included on a tribute compilation back in 2007.

On September 27, 2011, bassist Lior Mayer decided to leave the band to pursue musical education abroad, and the band's final show with this line up took place on October 12, 2011, at the Levontin 7 club.

In January 2012, a new bassist was introduced by the band - Roy Ben Samuel. Roy's first show with the band took place on January 20, 2012, at Zimmer in Tel Aviv.

2013 saw Dukatalon writing new material and giving live performances in Tel Aviv, Jerusalem and Haifa.

In 2014, the band started working on a new album. A very high standard was set for the recordings and progress was slow. Meticulous work was divided between three studios - the classical music orientated, state owned "Jerusalem Music Center" and the small, progressive and hardcore Tel Aviv based "Heavy Studios" and "Bardo". The work continued throughout 2015. Occasional live shows were also played in Tel Aviv, Jerusalem and Kiryat Malakhi.

2016 saw Dukatalon in the final stages of the album recordings, and on tour in Europe once again, this time in the UK.

== Band members ==
- Zafrir Tzori - lead vocals, guitar (2007–present)
- Yariv Shilo - drums, percussion (2007–present)
- Roy Ben Samuel - bass (2012–present)

Former members

- Lior Mayer - bass (2009–2011)
- Cavan - bass (2007–2009)
- Eliya Gwetta - bass (2009)

== Discography ==
- Saved By Fear (2010)
