= Rafflesia (band) =

Belgian metalcore band

- Origin: Zeebrugge, Belgium
- Genres: Metalcore, death metal, hardcore punk
- Years active: 2005–present
- Labels: Genet Records
- Members: Bart Teetaert - Vocals; Lazar Zec - Guitar; Christian Charles Borny - Guitar; Nick Vyvey - Bass; Nick Dapper - Drums
- Past members: Maxime Aneca - Guitar; Jeremy De Schrijver - Bass; Koen De Croo - Bass
- Website: www.rafflesiametalcore.com

Rafflesia is a Belgian metalcore band from Zeebrugge, Belgium, formed in 2005 as part of the H8000 scene. Their style has also been described as death metal and hardcore punk.

== History ==
In 2005, Bart Teetaert, Lazer Zec, Maxime Aneca, Nick Dapper and Jeremy de Schrijver formed the band. A few months later they performed at their first concert and quickly racked up a number of fans. Genet Records noticed this and signed them a record deal.

In May 2006, Rafflesia released their self-titled mini-cd containing five songs. Short after the mini-cd got released, Maxime Aneca got replaced by Christian Charles Borny (a.k.a. CCB). This change in the line-up caused more melody in their songs. In February 2007 Rafflesia travelled to Germany to record their first full cd named The Rape of Harmonies Studio with Ralf Müller and Alexander Dietz; respectively producer and guitar player from Heaven Shall Burn.

In May 2007 they released their album named Embrace the final day. The band subsequently played with such bands as Heaven Shall Burn, Maroon, Caliban, Sepultura, Aborted, Cro-Mags, Bleeding Through and Parkway Drive. During their tour the bassist Jeremy de Schrijver split from the band. He got temporarily replaced by Koen de Croo from Suburbia in Ruins, but he was soon replaced permanently by Nick Vyvey, who featured before in Omerta.

In June 2010, Rafflesia released their newest album titled In the Face of Suffering.

== Discography ==
=== Rafflesia (2006) ===
1. Driven By Fire
2. Suffocation Of The World
3. Abstract Divinity
4. 13 Hours
5. Last Words

=== Embrace the Final Day (2007) ===
1. Annihilation
2. A Time Of Deceit
3. Perfidy
4. The Beauty Of Silence
5. Preludium
6. Into Bloodshed
7. This Beast We Created
8. Box Nr. 8
9. Sinner's Cross
10. These Two Rivals

=== In the Face of Suffering (2010) ===
1. The Dead Tell No Tale
2. Bow Down
3. Autopsy Of A Blackened Soul
4. Axiom
5. Earth Stands Still
6. The Tide Of Death
7. New Dawn Rising
8. Misery And Pain
9. Divine Retribution
10. Unvanquished
