= Left Side Brain =

British rock band

- Origin: Bristol, England
- Genres: Alternative rock Hard rock Heavy metal
- Years active: 2000-2014
- Label: Sugar Shack Records
- Members: Gareth Jones; Oli Duerden; Rich Sadler; Ryan Brooks

Left Side Brain are an English-Welsh rock band from Bristol, England, who have released three albums on Bristol-based independent label Sugar Shack Records. Kerrang! described the band as "one of the brightest lights in British rock".

== Discography ==
=== Albums ===
- Equal and Opposite (2004)
- Action Potential (2006)
- Collider (2009)
- Rifftrospective: Ten Years of Left Side Brain (2010)

=== EPs ===
- Surface Tension EP (2004)

=== Compilation appearances ===
- Kerrang! New Breed (2006) "Well Well Well"
- Pledge: A Tribute to Kerbdog (2010) "Severed"
- The Razor Vol.1 - Music From The Cutting Edge (2004) "Figures"
