= The Black Heart Rebellion =

Belgian band

- Origin: Ghent, East Flanders, Belgium
- Genres: Neofolk; post-rock; post-hardcore
- Years active: 2004–2021
- Labels: Smoke & Dust; 9000; Adagio 830; Consouling Sounds; Tokyo Jupiter
- Members: Pieter Uyttenhove; Alex Maekelberg; Emeriek Verhoye; Valentijn Goethals; Tim Bryon
- Website: theblackheartrebellion.com

The Black Heart Rebellion were a Belgian experimental band from Ghent, formed in 2004 by vocalist Pieter Uyttenhove, guitarists Alex Maekelberg and Valentijn Goethals, bassist Emeriek Verhoye, and drummer Tim Bryon. Their initial style was rooted in hardcore punk, as manifest on their debut album Monologue (2008). Soon after its release, the band scored a stage play, which sparked a process of artistic reinvention culminating in the release of Har Nevo in 2012. They experimented with atmosphere, introducing unconventional percussion patterns and new instruments such as the Indian harmonium and the bouzouki. On their third album People, When You See the Smoke, Do Not Think It Is Fields They're Burning (2015), the Black Heart Rebellion went further in this direction. Their latest project was a 2018 alternative soundtrack to the film A Girl Walks Home Alone at Night. They split in 2021, with Pieter, Alex, and Emeriek starting a new group, TAKH.

During their transformative period, the band joined Church of Ra, a collaborative artist collective started by Amenra. They emphasize the integration of multiple forms, including music, performance, visual art, and ritual. Since 2008, Goethals, Bryon, and Tomas Lootens run their own record label Smoke & Dust, which has also spawned the 019 music venue/arts centre in Ghent.

== History ==
The band formed within the hardcore scene in 2004, when the members were around 17–18 years old. Drummer Tim Bryon had just dropped out of music academy, feeling "the urge to play heavier music". The Black Heart Rebellion toured throughout Europe and as far as Malaysia and Japan, where their debut album Monologue was released in 2009. Around this time, they collaborated with Belgian-German theatre company In Vitro, creating a live soundtrack to the play Medea. The project led them to question their creative direction, marking the start of a "difficult" period of personal and stylistic transformation that spanned four years and almost saw the band break up. They came through with a new approach and joined Amenra's Church of Ra collective. In March 2012, they entered the studio of Koen Gisen, recording their second album Har Nevo. Gisen had previously worked on indie rock and singer-songwriter records and this was his "heaviest" project yet, which "drove both parties out of their comfort zones". After Har Nevo's release, the band received some emails from disappointed fans of their older work, to which Bryon generally responded: "Give [the album] some time. Leave it and then listen to it again."

The Black Heart Rebellion began performing live again, appearing at the Belgian festivals Dour, Pukkelpop, and Boomtown in August 2013. For the production of their third album, they returned to Gisen's studio. People, When You See the Smoke, Do Not Think It Is Fields They're Burning was released through 9000 Records on 23 October 2015. The title is taken from a death poem by the Zen monk Baika, who on his deathbed "was picturing how passersby could misinterpret the signs (smoke) of his cremation." In 2018, the band created an alternative soundtrack to the 2014 vampire film A Girl Walks Home Alone at Night, performing it live with the film screening in the background. The soundtrack was released in April 2018 through their own label Smoke & Dust. While the film is in Persian, Uyttenhove's vocals on the record use a non-existent language.

The band announced their end in November 2021 due to "shifting focus to careers, children and other (musical) experiences"; Pieter, Alex, and Emeriek together with Annelies Van Dinter (who previously appeared as a vocalist on People, when you see the smoke…) began to record under the new name TAKH.

== Style and influences ==
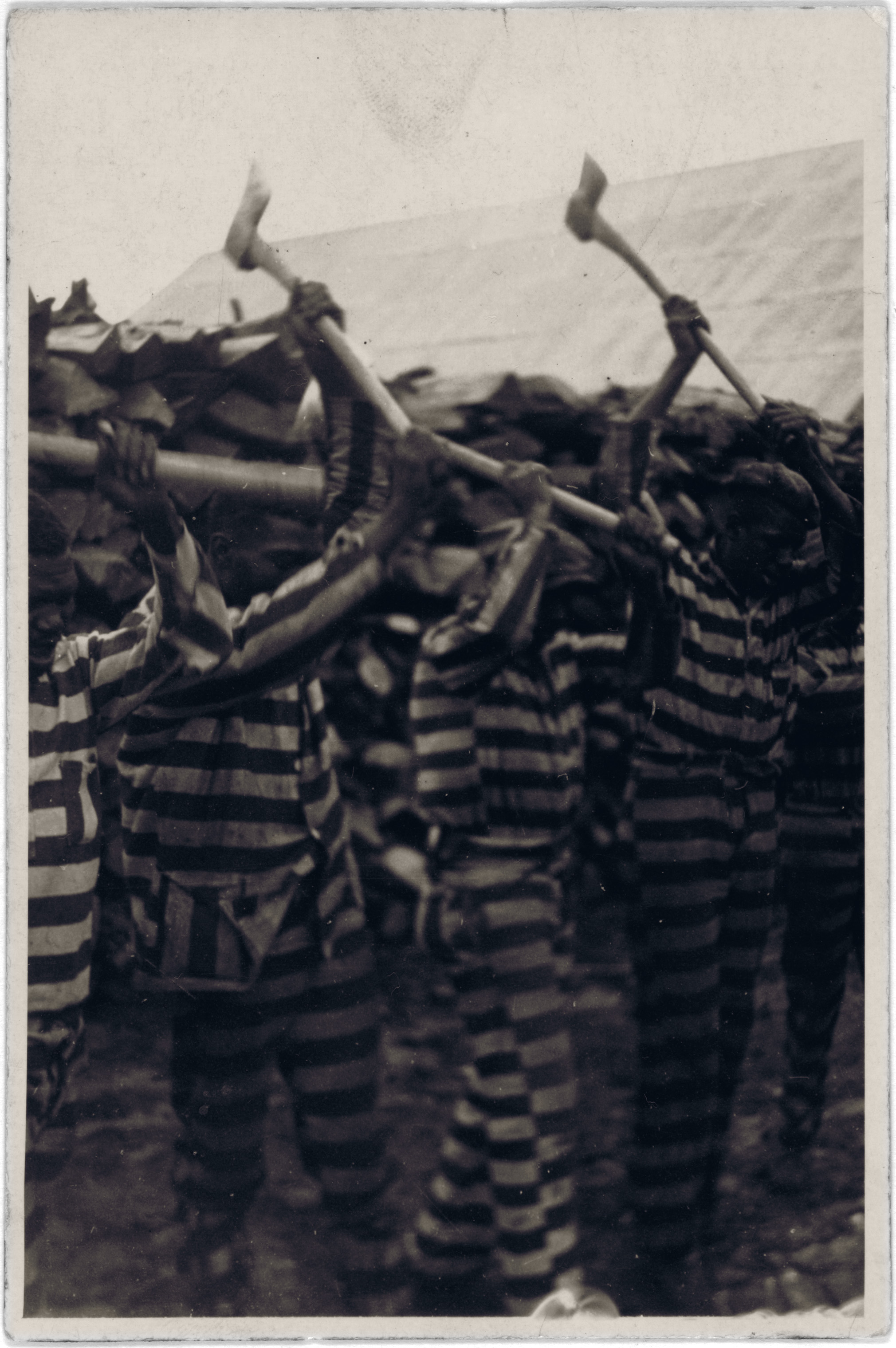
Alan Lomax's 1941 recording Midnight Special and Other Southern Prison Songs influenced the band's use of percussion.

The band's initial style around the release of Monologue was described as screamo or post-metal, weaving desolate melodies into violent crescendos. Afterwards, the Black Heart Rebellion revised their direction radically. In 2015, Benjamin Bland of Drowned in Sound wrote that Har Nevo was "the sound of a band apparently stuck between two occasionally contradictory paths. There were attempts to capture the intensity of visceral hardcore, combined with leanings towards ritualistic post-punk. On new album People, when you see the smoke, do not think it is the fields they are burning the latter tendency has very much won out. ...even at the record's most up-tempo, the vocals of Pieter Uyttenhove remain clean". He described the album as "slow-burning music that looks to envelop and intoxicate its listeners through a diet of drones, pulsating riffs and unusual percussion sounds ... [with] shades of neofolk and a vaguely black metal-esque atmosphere." Around the same time, Noisey wrote that the band "treads the dusty ground between doom, post-rock, tribal beats, ritual percussion, and ambient", while Nic Smith of SLUG summarized them as a marriage of Amenra and Swans. In 2016, Bryon dismissed the labels "neofolk" and "dark post-rock", saying that people should not be "breaking their heads over ... finding the right tag for TBHR."

In 2013, Bryon and Uyttenhove agreed that although they have largely abandoned punk rock musically, they still identify with its independent ethos. Their aim is to create a unique atmosphere manifest in all aspects of the band's music as well as live performance (including stage lighting) and visual art. When asked about the impact of theatre on their style in 2015, Uyttenhove stated: "For me a good song exists out of two parts: the main part is, always, a story that's being told, or a feeling or emotion that's being evoked. The other part is the way in which story, feeling or emotion is brought, I mean with what instruments, melodies, rhythms etc. [Our work with In Vitro taught] us a lot about that and made us question how that 'storytelling' can take place, which factors can help delivering the story in the best way possible."

Speaking about the evolution of his approach, Bryon said in 2016: "I took a step back from the conventional drum patterns in underground heavy music and searched for inspiration where percussion really created an atmosphere, rather than just decibels... There may be little traces of it in what I actually play, but bands like Dawanggang, Karantamba and several of the recordings of Alan Lomax (like the prison songs and the album Saraca: [Funerary Music of Carriacou]) really fascinate me. Blending these influences with heavier guitars and vocals brought us to [our current] zone." He also expressed admiration for the work of Nick Cave, Tom Waits, and Hugues C. Pernath as well as Neurosis and Six Organs of Admittance. In 2018, Koen Lauwers of HUMO compared aspects of the band's live performance to Sonic Youth, Sunn O))), Pan Sonic, and the Velvet Underground.

== Members ==
- Pieter Uyttenhove – vocals, Indian harmonium
- Alex Maekelberg – guitar, bouzouki, percussion
- Emeriek Verhoye – bass
- Valentijn Goethals – guitar, visual art
- Tim Bryon – drums, percussion

== Discography ==
Studio albums

- Monologue (2008)
- Har Nevo (2012)
- People, When You See the Smoke, Do Not Think It Is Fields They're Burning (2015)

Splits

- Autumn Delay / The Black Heart Rebellion (2006)
- The Black Heart Rebellion & Adorno (2011)
- Brethren Bound by Blood 1/3 with Amenra (2011)
- T.B.H.R. & K.T.A.O.A.B.C. with Kiss the Anus of a Black Cat (2016)

Others

- The Black Heart Rebellion (compilation, 2008)
- The Black Heart Rebellion Plays A Girl Walks Home Alone at Night (An Alternative Soundtrack to the Motion Picture) (2018)
