= Cataract (band) =

Swiss metalcore band

- Origin: Switzerland
- Genres: Metalcore, thrash metal
- Years active: 1998–2013
- Labels: Metal Blade
- Members: Nico Schläpfer; Greg Mäder; Federico Carminitana; Ricky Dürst; Tom Kuzmic
- Past members: Christian Ebert; Michael Henggeler; Kay Brem; Simon Füllemann
- Website: cataract.cc

Cataract was a Swiss metalcore band signed to Metal Blade Records. The band formed in 1998 and disbanded in 2013.

== Biography ==
Cataract was formed in 1998 by guitarist Simon Füllemann, guitarist Greg Mäder and drummer Ricky Dürst and about a month later the lineup was complete with the Addition of Michael Henggeler on bass. Their first self-titled demo was recorded in six hours and mixed in another four hours in the bedroom of vocalist Christian 'Mosh' Ebert. This hardcore/metal demo CD sold over 2,000 copies.

Cataract recorded their first album, Golem, with producer Alessandro Azzali in April 2000; the Ferret Music label released Golem in December that year.

In early 2001, Cataract's first lineup change took place. Fedi replaced previous singer Mosh, allowing the band to rehearse more often and regularly. Shortly after, Cataract recorded five songs for the Martyr's Melodies EP, which was released on 7" and as a MCD. The band played at Hellfest and various shows with Poison the Well, Bane, Unearth, NORA, 18 Visions and Most Precious Blood on Cataract's first US tour.

Most of 2002 was dedicated to working on the second full-length album, Great Days of Vengeance, which was released through Lifeforce Records in March 2003. The new album was more metal oriented than Golem.

Cataract caught the attention of Metal Blade Records and was ultimately signed to their roster in 2004. In March they entered the Antfarm Studios and worked on their next release with producer Tue Madsen. With Triumph Comes Loss was welcomed warmly thanks to the aggressive sound and the groovy songs. The release was followed by a multitude of festivals and weekend trips to promote the album.

In May 2006, Cataract released Kingdom, the band's fourth full-length album and later on this year original bass Player Michael Henggeler left the band and shortly later teamed up with Swiss Hardcore heavyweights Valo Tudo which prompted Cataract to get Kay Brem to Join them but that did not last long. In January 2007 founding member Simon left the band and was replaced with guitarist Tom Kuzmic (formerly of Swiss death metal band Disparaged). Kay Brem was then also replaced by Nico Schläpfer. With this new lineup, the band recorded its fifth and self-titled album in November, which was released in March 2008.

In 2010, the band released the album Killing the Eternal.

The band broke up on 23 May 2013.

== Members ==
=== Current members ===
- Federico 'Fedi' Carminitana – vocals (2001–2013)
- Greg Mäder – guitars (1998–2013)
- Ricky Dürst – drums (1998–2013)
- Nico Schläpfer – bass (2007–2013)
- Tom Kuzmic – guitars (2007–2013)

=== Former members ===
- Christian 'Mosh' Ebert – vocals (1998–2001)
- Simon Füllemann – guitars (1998–2007)
- Michael Henggeler – bass (1998–2006)
- Kay Brem – bass (2006–2007)

== Discography ==
- Cataract (demo) – 1998/99
- War Anthems (3-song single) – 1999
- Golem – 2000
- Martyr's Melodies EP – 2001/2002
- Great Days of Vengeance – 2003
- With Triumph Comes Loss – 2004
- Kingdom – 2006
- Cataract – 2008
- Killing the Eternal – 2010
