= JR Ewing (band) =

Norwegian band

JR Ewing was a hardcore punk/screamo band from Norway. It was formed in 1998 in Oslo and broke up after its final tour across Europe in 2005.

Musician Laurent Barnard of Gallows has named JR Ewing as an influence, calling them the "epitome of cool" and characterising their sound as "sophisticated yet raw". Barnard writes, "JR Ewing produced this misshaped aggressive noise and fashioned it into a glorious, hammering wall of sound."

== Band members ==
=== Final line up ===
- Andreas Tylden – vocals
- Erlend Mokkelbost – guitar, background vocals
- Håkon Mella – guitar
- Kenneth Lamond – drums
- Petter Snekkestad – bass guitar, background vocals

=== Former members ===
- Aaron Rudra – original bass guitarist
- Nils Strand – bass guitar
- Jonas Thire – drums
- Morten Billeskalns – drums
- Martin Faksvaag Molden – guitar

== Discography ==
Full albums:

- 2000 – Calling in Dead
- 2003 – Ride Paranoia
- 2005 – Maelstrom

EPs, singles:

- 2000 – The Singles Collected
- 2002 – The Perfect Drama
- 2003 – Laughing with Daggers
- 2005 – Fucking & Champagne
