= Nueva Ética =

Argentine metalcore band

- Also known as: South American Mosh Machine
- Origin: Buenos Aires, Argentina
- Genres: Metalcore; heavy hardcore
- Years active: 1998–present
- Labels: 78 Life; Reality; Inmune; Vegan; New Eden; Caboose
- Members: Gerardo Villalobos; Betoxxx; Javier Suárez; Pablo Nuñez; Javier Casas; Lisandro Guerra

Nueva Ética (New Ethic) is an Argentine metalcore band formed in Buenos Aires in 1998. They follow the vegan straight edge philosophy and are one of the first Latin American hardcore punk bands to tour the world. Nueva Ética's music has been described as a mix of Hatebreed and Terror.

== History ==
=== Formation and Momento de la Verdad (1998–2001) ===
Nueva Ética was formed in 1998 by members of other hardcore bands from Buenos Aires, including Vieja escuela, Autocontrol and Sudarshana. They began with three singers in the tradition of Path of Resistance and Point of No Return. A year later, they released their first work entitled Momento de la Verdad, which gained a good reputation in the Brazilian hardcore scene. In 1999 they toured Argentina, Brazil, Chile and Uruguay.

=== La Venganza de los Justos (2002–2005) ===
In 2002, the band released their second work La Venganza de los Justos. For this album, Nueva Ética replaced one of their vocalists with a new member, but shortly after recording it they returned to the original line-up. La Venganza de los Justos was issued in Latin America, the United States, Japan and Europe. In 2003, the band toured Europe for the first time, including performances at Ieperfest (Belgium) and Fluff Fest (Czech Republic).

=== Inquebrantable (2006–2008) ===
Nueva Ética released Inquebrantable in 2006 after five months of recording in the MCP Studio of Martín Carrizo (drummer of the band A.N.I.M.A.L.), who was in charge of its recording and sound, as well as participating as a guest musician. The production, mixing and mastering was done at Tue Madsen's AntFarm Studios in Denmark. Inquebrantable was distributed in Brazil by Liberación Records, in Argentina by Vegan Records, in the United States by New Eden Records and in Europe by Alveran. The online magazine Laut.de compared it with Hatebreed and Terror. The band embarked on a world tour to promote the album, starting in South America (Chile and Brazil) and then playing 58 tour dates in Europe, featuring appearances at Fluff Fest and Pressure Festival in Germany.

In 2007, the band returned to Buenos Aires, playing with Caliban, Terror and again Heaven Shall Burn. Later they toured through Hispanic America.

=== 3L1T3 and Esto es Sudamérica (2008–2012) ===
In 2008, Nueva Ética celebrated its 10th anniversary with a sold-out show at El Teatro Colegiales in Buenos Aires. That year, they released their fourth album 3L1T3, produced by Tue Madsen and featuring Martín Carrizo on drums and a guest appearance by Scott Vogel of Terror. They released a music video for "El Tiempo es Ahora" (The Time is Now) from the album, which highlights alarming statistics of the growing use of drugs and alcohol in Argentina. In 2014, "El Tiempo es Ahora" had reached over 200,000 views on YouTube. By 2009, Nueva Ética became the most listened heavy metal and hard rock band from Argentina on MySpace, surpassing artists such as Rata Blanca and Carajo.

In May 2012, Nueva Ética released the DVD This is South America via Seven Eight Life Recordings, recorded in 2010 in São Paulo, Brazil and including videos of other international performances.

=== Hiatus and reunion (2013–present) ===
Nueva Ética entered a hiatus around 2013 in which the band members took different musical and personal paths.

On 15 March 2015, Nueva Ética did one show in Buenos Aires, Argentina.

In 2019, Momento de la Verdad, La Venganza de los Justos and Inquebrantable were re-issued on vinyl through Vegan Records, Argentina. In April, vocalist Gerardo Villalobos joined Locked Inside, a group based in New York with members of Mouthpiece and Youth of Today. In July 2019, Nueva Ética announced the upcoming EP La Conquista, which will include appearances by members of Earth Crisis, Heaven Shall Burn, Merauder and Year of the Knife.

== Members ==
Current members

- Gerardo Villalobos – vocals
- Alberto "Betoxxx" Vicente – vocals
- Javier Casas – guitars
- Lisandro "Pitbull" Guerra – guitars
- Javier Suárez – bass, backing vocals
- Emilio "Coki" Ponti – drums

Former members

- Mariano "Punga" Safe – vocals
- Manolo Jofré – vocals
- Ezequiel "Eke" Asco – vocals
- Diego Sartor – guitars
- Patricio "Pato Most Wanted" – bass
- Javier "Mojarra" Santa Cruz – bass
- Bruno "Melón" Bordón – drums
- Pablo Nuñez – drums

== Discografía ==
Studio albums

- Momento de la Verdad (1999)
- La Venganza de los Justos (2002)
- Inquebrantable (2006)
- 3L1T3 (2008)

EPs

- La Conquista (2019)

Video albums

- Esto es Sudamérica (2012)
