= Stampin' Ground =

British metalcore band

- Origin: Cheltenham, England
- Genres: Groove metal; metalcore; hardcore punk
- Years active: 1995–2006, 2014, 2025-present
- Labels: We Bite; Kingfisher; Century Media
- Past members: Adam Frakes-Sime; Scott Atkins; Antony "Mobs" Mowbray; Ben Frost; Neil Hutton; Ian Glasper; Ade Stokes; Heath Crosby; Paul Catten
- Website: Stampin' Ground on Facebook

Stampin' Ground is an English metalcore band from Cheltenham, initially active from 1995 to 2006, a short stint in 2014 then active again since 2024. The band has toured with the likes of Anthrax, Chimaira, The Haunted, Agnostic Front, Sick of It All, Soulfly, Arch Enemy, and played the main stage at Download Festival 2003.

On 24 February 2014, they were announced to be playing the 2014 UK leg of the Sonisphere festival. They went on to play a string of dates in that year, which would be their last dates for the time being, finishing at Damnation Festival in November 2014. On 2 December 2024, it was announced that they will be playing at Damnation Festival 2025 celebrating 20 years of Damnation Festival and main stage at Revolution Calling Festival along with the 25th anniversary of their LP Carved From Empty Words.

2026 sees them playing live again including Bloodstock Festival 2026 and Download Festival 2026

== Members ==
- Adam Frakes-Sime – vocals (1998–2006, 2014, 2025–Present)
- Ian Glasper – bass (1995–2003, 2025–Present)
- Ade Stokes – drums (1995–2002, 2025–Present)
- Jim Saunders- guitar (2025–Present)
- Paul Fletcher - guitar (2014, 2024–present)
- Scott Atkins – guitar (1995–2006, 2014)
- Antony "Mobs" Mowbray – guitar
- Ben Frost – bass (2003–2006, 2014)
- Neil Hutton – drums (2002–2006)
- Heath Crosby – vocals (1995–1997)
- Paul Catten – vocals (demos only)

== Discography ==
- "Dawn of Night" 7 single (1996)
- "Starved" 7" single (1996)
- Stampin' Ground mini-CD (1996)
- Demons Run Amok (1997)
- An Expression of Repressed Violence (1998)
- The Darkside Versus the Eastside (split mini-CD with Knuckledust) (1999)
- Carved from Empty Words (2000)
- Allied Forces (split EP with North Side Kings) (2002)
- Trapped in the Teeth of Demons live 10" (limited edition picture disc) (2003)
- A New Darkness Upon Us (2003)
- "For Those Who Fear Allegiance" limited edition 7" single (2025)
