= Knuckledust =

British hardcore band

- Origin: London, England
- Genre: Heavy hardcore
- Years active: 1996–present
- Labels: GSR Music & Rucktion Records

Knuckledust are a British heavy hardcore band from London. The band was formed in 1996 when Nic, Ray and Wema contacted Pelbu to start a band. The band went on to release many albums, tour the world extensively and continue to do so today, without any changes in personnel. They have cited influences including 25 Ta Life, Warzone, Agnostic Front and Sheer Terror.

== Members ==
- Nic – bass (also in Ninebar, formerly in Deadline and the Business)
- Pelbu – vocals (also in Bun Dem Out, Bortsal, formerly in Beatdown Fury and Maldito)
- Ray – drums (also in Argy Bargy, formerly in Deadline, Deny Everything and the Business)
- Wema – guitar (also in Ironed Out)

== Discography ==
=== Studio albums ===
- Time Won't Heal This (2000, Blackfish/Rucktion/Thorp Records)
- Universal Struggle (2003, GSR Music)
- Unbreakable (2005, GSR Music)
- Promises Comfort Fools (2007, GSR Music)
- Bluffs, Lies & Alibis (2012, GSR Music)
- Songs of Sacrifice (2016, GSR Music)

=== EPs ===
- Demo (1996, self-released)
- London Hardcore (1997, Days of Fury)
- In Yer Boat (1998, Household Name)
- ...In Plain Sight (2021, Time Won’t Heal This/Bloodblast)

=== Splits ===
- With Area Effect (1997, Black-Up)
- Smash Tradition with Indecision (1998, Household Name)
- The Darkside Versus the Eastside with Stampin' Ground (1999, Blackfish)
- Together We Stand, Divided We Brawl with Unite (2001, Blackfish)

=== Compilations ===
- Dustography (2006, Rucktion)

=== Compilation appearances ===
- Fuck Off Household Name (1998, Household Name)
- Time for Some Rucktion (2004, Rucktion)
- Kirisaki Compilation (2009, Kirisaki Records)

=== Music videos ===
- "25 Years Dead" (2003)
- "Bluffs, Lies & Alibis" (2012)
- "Foundations" (2014)
- "Life Struggle" (2016)
- "Humanities Nightmare" (2016)
- "Kings And Toys" (2021)
