= Ghost Empire =

Studio album by Caliban
- Released: 24 January 2014
- Genre: Metalcore
- Length: 48:04
- Languages: English, German
- Label: Century Media
- Producers: Benny Richter, Marc Görtz

Caliban chronology
I Am Nemesis (2012)	Ghost Empire (2014)	Gravity (2016)

Professional ratings
Review scores
Source	Rating
About.com	4/5 stars
Rock Sound	6/10

Ghost Empire is the ninth studio album by German metalcore band Caliban, released on 24 January 2014 through Century Media Records. The album entered the German Media Control Charts at number 7, becoming Caliban's first top 10 album.

== Track listing ==
All lyrics are written by Dörner, additional lyrics written by Richter and Görtz; all music is composed by Görtz.

No.	Title	Additional lyrics	Length
1.	"King"		4:02
2.	"Chaos – Creation"		3:30
3.	"Wolves and Rats"		3:59
4.	"nebeL"	Sobtzick	3:11
5.	"I Am Ghost"		3:46
6.	"Devil's Night"		4:23
7.	"yOUR Song"		4:26
8.	"Cries and Whispers"		3:55
9.	"Good Man"		5:07
10.	"I Am Rebellion"		4:21
11.	"Who We Are"		4:09
12.	"My Vertigo"		3:15
Total length:			48:04

Limited Edition bonus track
No.	Title	Additional lyrics	Length
13.	"Falling Downwards"	Heafy	3:47
Total length:			51:54

iTunes bonus tracks
No.	Title	Additional lyrics	Length
13.	"Falling Downwards"	Live Track (Available with "Album Only" Purchase)	3:47
14.	"We Are The Many (Live in Bochum 2012)"	Live Track (Available with "Album Only" Purchase)	4:33
15.	"Davy Jones (Live in Bochum 2012)"	Live Track	4:26
16.	"The Bogeyman (Live in Bochum 2012)"	Live Track	4:33
Total length:			65:28

== Credits ==
Writing, performance and production credits are adapted from the album liner notes.

=== Personnel ===
Caliban

- Andreas Dörner – lead vocals
- Marc Görtz – lead guitar
- Denis Schmidt – rhythm guitar, clean vocals
- Marco Schaller – bass, backing vocals
- Patrick Grün – drums

Guest musicians

- Bastian Sobtzick (Callejon) – vocals on "nebeL"
- Christoph Koterzina (Callejon) – vocals on "Good Man"
- Matt Heafy – vocals on "Falling Downwards"

Additional musicians

- Benny Richter – keyboards, additional vocals
- Marcel Neumann (We Butter the Bread with Butter) – additional keyboards
- Christoph Koterzina (Callejon) – backing vocals
- Neberu – group shouts

Production

- Benny Richter – production, recording (at B.B.Serious Studios only)
- Marc Görtz – production, recording (at Nemesis Studios only)
- Marcel Neumann (We Butter the Bread with Butter) – co-production of "Chaos – Creation", "Wolves and Rats", "Cries and Whispers", "Who We Are", "My Vertigo"
- Dominic Paraskevopoulos – recording (drums only)
- Klaus Scheuermann – mixing
- Olman Viper – mastering

Artwork and design

- Christopher Lovell – artwork
- Thomas Böcker – graphic design
- Sandra Muequin – photography

=== Studios ===
- B.B.Serious Studios – recording
- Nemesis Studios – recording
- LEVEL3ENTERTAINMENT – recording (drums only)
- Hertwerk/nullzweistudios – mastering

== Release history ==
Region	Date
Germany, Austria, Switzerland, Australia, New Zealand	24 January 2014
Europe	27 January 2014
USA, Canada	4 February 2014

== Charts ==
Chart (2014)	Peak position
Austrian Albums (Ö3 Austria)	32
Belgian Albums (Ultratop Wallonia)	184
German Albums (Offizielle Top 100)	7
Swiss Albums (Schweizer Hitparade)	51
