= Gravity (Caliban album) =

Studio album by Caliban
- Released: 25 March 2016
- Genre: Metalcore
- Length: 45:46
- Languages: English, German
- Label: Century Media
- Producers: Benny Richter, Marc Görtz, Marcel Neumann

Caliban chronology
Ghost Empire (2014)	Gravity (2016)	Elements (2018)

Professional ratings
Review scores
Source	Rating
Louder Sound	3.5/5 stars
Metal Injection	8/10
New Noise Magazine	2.5/5

Gravity is the tenth studio album by German metalcore band Caliban, released on 25 March 2016 through Century Media Records. Guitarist Marc Görtz described the album as "as more rough, more heavy then previous albums. I wanted to capture the heaviness of the albums I Am Nemesis and Shadow Hearts for example and still have the big melody from Ghost Empire". A music video was released for the track "Paralyzed".

== Track listing ==
All lyrics are written by Andreas Dörner; all music is composed by Marc Görtz.

No.	Title	Length
1.	"Paralyzed"	4:33
2.	"Mein schwarzes Herz"	3:02
3.	"Who I Am"	4:12
4.	"Left for Dead"	3:24
5.	"Crystal Skies"	3:32
6.	"Walk Alone"	4:10
7.	"The Ocean's Heart"	3:54
8.	"Broken"	4:07
9.	"For We Are Forever"	3:39
10.	"Inferno"	3:39
11.	"No Dream Without a Sacrifice"	3:53
12.	"Hurricane"	3:41
Total length:		45:46

== Credits ==
=== Personnel ===
Caliban

- Andreas Dörner – lead vocals
- Marc Görtz – lead guitar
- Denis Schmidt – rhythm guitar, clean vocals
- Marco Schaller – bass guitar
- Patrick Grün – drums

Guest musicians

- Benny Richter – keyboards, backing vocals
- Marcel Neumann (We Butter the Bread with Butter) – keyboards on "Left for Dead"
- Jamie Graham (Viscera, ex-Sylosis) – vocals on "Crystal Skies"
- Alissa White-Gluz – vocals on "The Ocean's Heart"
- Katha Grischkowski – vocals on "Mein schwarzes Herz" and "No Dream Without a Sacrifice"
- Marcel Gadacz (Dream On Dreamer) – vocals on "Inferno"
- Zachary Britt (Dream On Dreamer) – vocals on "Inferno"

Production

- Benny Richter – production
- Marc Görtz – production, mixing
- Marcel Neumann (We Butter the Bread with Butter) – production
- Klaus Scheuermann – mixing
- Olman Viper – mastering

Artwork and design

- Marcel Gadacz – artwork, graphic design
- Moritz Maibaum – photography

=== Studios ===
- Nemesis Studios – recording, mixing
- 4ohm Music – mixing
- Hertwerk – mastering

== Charts ==
Chart (2016)	Peak position
Austrian Albums (Ö3 Austria)	26
Belgian Albums (Ultratop Wallonia)	123
German Albums (Offizielle Top 100)	15
Swiss Albums (Schweizer Hitparade)	27
