= Chronos (EP) =

EP by Callejon
- Released: 7 February 2005
- Genre: Metalcore
- Label: My Favourite Toy

Callejon chronology
| Demo 2003 (2003) | Chronos (2005) | Willkommen im Beerdigungscafé (2006) |

Chronos is an EP by German metalcore band Callejon.

It was rated a 6 out of 10 by Thomas Eberhardt of Ox-Fanzine.

== Track listing ==
| No. | Title | Length |
|---|---|---|
| 1. | "Intro" | 0:18 |
| 2. | "Egosozial ("Self Social")" | 3:01 |
| 3. | "Astronaut" | 2:22 |
| 4. | "Sackgasse ("Deadlock")" | 2:36 |
| 5. | "Instrumental" | 2:44 |
| 6. | "Chronos" | 4:02 |
| 7. | "Lent" | 3:50 |
| 8. | "Sarggeflüster ("Grave Whispering")" | 3:22 |
| Total length: | | 22:15 |
