= The Awakening (Caliban album) =

Studio album by Caliban
- Released: 25 May 2007 (Germany)
- Recorded: January–February 2007 at Cemetery Studios
- Genre: Metalcore
- Length: 43:38
- Label: Roadrunner, Century Media
- Producer: Benny Richter

Caliban chronology
The Undying Darkness (2006)	The Awakening (2007)	Say Hello to Tragedy (2009)

Professional ratings
Review scores
Source	Rating
Terrorizer Magazine	(6.5/10)
Metal Hammer	(7/10)
Metal Storm	(4/10)
Sputnikmusic	2/5 stars
AllMusic	2.5/5 stars

The Awakening is the sixth studio album by German metalcore band Caliban, released in Germany on 25 May 2007 and in the UK on 28 May. The album peaked at number 36 on the German album charts. A limited digipak edition was released, which also came with a bonus patch. The album was released in the United States on 23 October 2007. This delay was because of the band's American label, Abacus Recordings, merging with Century Media.

== Track listing ==
All lyrics written by Andreas Dörner and all music written by Marc Görtz.

No.	Title	Length
1.	"I Will Never Let You Down"	3:33
2.	"Let Go"	3:58
3.	"Another Cold Day"	4:34
4.	"My Time Has Come"	3:41
5.	"Life Is Too Short"	3:42
6.	"Give Me a Reason"	3:55
7.	"Stop Running"	3:18
8.	"The Awakening"	3:53
9.	"I Believe..."	3:20
10.	"Rise and Fight"	3:37
11.	"Nowhere to Run, No Place to Hide"	3:38
12.	"I'll Show No Fear"	3:29
Total length:		43:38

Japanese Edition Bonus Track
No.	Title	Length
13.	"I See the Falling Sky" (feat. Anders Fridén of In Flames))	5:07
Total length:		48:45

== Personnel ==
- Andreas Dörner – lead vocals
- Denis Schmidt – rhythm guitar, clean vocals
- Marc Goertz – lead guitar
- Marco Schaller – bass, backing vocals
- Patrick Grün – drums
- Anders Fridén – lead vocals on "I See the Falling Sky"

Credits

- Produced by Benny Richter
- Co-produced by Marc Goertz
- Mixed by Adam Dutkiewicz
- Music by Marc Goertz
- Music arranged by Caliban
- Lyrics by Andreas Dörner
- Keyboards and samples by Benny Richter
- Additional bass guitar by Bony Fertigmensch

== Charts ==
Chart (2007)	Peak position
Austrian Albums (Ö3 Austria)	74
German Albums (Offizielle Top 100)	36
