= Elements (Caliban album) =

Studio album by Caliban
- Released: 6 April 2018
- Genre: Metalcore
- Length: 50:14
- Languages: English, German
- Label: Century Media
- Producers: Benny Richter, Marc Görtz, Callan Orr, Andy Posdziech

Caliban chronology
Gravity (2016)	Elements (2018)	Zeitgeister (2021)

Professional ratings
Review scores
Source	Rating
Heavymetal.dk	8/10
Rock Hard	8.5/10
Soundi.fi	5/5 stars
Visions	7/12

Elements is the eleventh studio album by German metalcore band Caliban, released on 6 April 2018 through Century Media Records.

== Track listing ==
All lyrics are written by Andreas Dörner; all music is composed by Marc Görtz.

No.	Title	Length
1.	"This Is War"	3:01
2.	"Intoxicated"	4:02
3.	"Ich blute für dich"	3:57
4.	"Before Later Becomes Never"	4:12
5.	"Set Me Free"	4:35
6.	"My Madness"	3:49
7.	"I Am Fear"	4:31
8.	"Delusion"	3:54
9.	"Carry On"	3:20
10.	"Masquerade"	4:15
11.	"Incomplete"	3:20
12.	"The Great Unknown"	3:37
13.	"Sleepers Awake"	3:41
Total length:		50:14

== Credits ==
=== Personnel ===
Caliban

- Andreas Dörner – lead vocals
- Marc Görtz – lead guitar
- Denis Schmidt – rhythm guitar, clean vocals
- Marco Schaller – bass guitar
- Patrick Grün – drums

Guest musicians

- Matthi Nasty – vocals on "Ich blute für dich"
- Sebastian Biesler (ex-Electric Callboy) – vocals on "Ich blute für dich"
- CJ McMahon (Thy Art Is Murder) – vocals on "Before Later Becomes Never"
- Brian Welch – vocals on "Masquerade"

Production

- Benny Richter – production, recording
- Marc Görtz – production, mixing
- Callan Orr – production
- Andy Posdziech – production
- Olman Viper – mastering
- Marcel Gadacz – artwork, graphic design

=== Studios ===
- B.B. Serious – recording
- Nemesis Studios – recording, mixing
- Hertwerk – mastering

== Charts ==
Chart (2018)	Peak position
Austrian Albums (Ö3 Austria)	26
Belgian Albums (Ultratop Wallonia)	166
German Albums (Offizielle Top 100)	6
Swiss Albums (Schweizer Hitparade)	38
