= Man spricht Deutsch =

Studio album by Callejon
- Released: 11 January 2013
- Genre: Metalcore
- Length: 39:01
- Label: Four Music

Callejon chronology
Blitzkreuz (2012)	Man spricht Deutsch (2013)	Wir sind Angst (2015)

Man spricht Deutsch is the fifth album by German metalcore band Callejon.

It features exclusively cover versions of famous German songs. The album entered the German Media Control Charts at number 7.

== Track listing ==
No.	Title	Original artist	Length
1.	"Schrei nach Liebe"	Die Ärzte	3:33
2.	"Schwule Mädchen"	Fettes Brot	3:25
3.	"Alles neu"	Peter Fox	4:11
4.	"Ich find' dich scheiße"	Tic Tac Toe	2:51
5.	"Durch den Monsun"	Tokio Hotel	3:16
6.	"Mein Block"	Sido	3:54
7.	"Ein Kompliment"	Sportfreunde Stiller	3:13
8.	"Hier kommt Alex"	Die Toten Hosen	3:22
9.	"Major Tom"	Peter Schilling	4:29
10.	"MfG"	Die Fantastischen Vier	3:30
11.	"Alles nur geklaut"	Die Prinzen	3:22
Total length:			39:01

Premium edition bonus tracks
No.	Title	Original artist	Length
12.	"Chicago"	Clueso	3:33
13.	"Boomerang"	Blümchen	3:53
Total length:			46:27

== Credits ==
Guest musicians

- Bela B. on "Schrei nach Liebe"
- K.I.Z on "Ich find' dich scheiße"

== Charts ==
Chart	Peak position
Austrian Albums (Ö3 Austria)	61
German Albums (Offizielle Top 100)	7
