= Dystopia (Caliban album) =

Studio album by Caliban
- Released: 22 April 2022
- Genre: Metalcore
- Length: 47:47
- Label: Century Media Records

Caliban chronology
Zeitgeister (2021)	Dystopia (2022)	Back from Hell (2025)

Professional ratings
Review scores
Source	Rating
Heavymetal.dk	8/10
Metal Injection	8/10
Metal.de	7/10
Powermetal.de	7.5/10
Rock Hard	7/10
Visions	8/12

Dystopia is the thirteenth studio album by the German metalcore band Caliban, released on 22 April 2022 by Century Media Records. The album has received positive feedback from reviewers.

It is their last album with bassist Marco Schaller. The band embarked on a European tour in December 2022, though the tour was shortened "due to a combination of organizational, general, and economic obstacles".

== Track listing ==
1. "Dystopia" (featuring Christoph Wieczorek (Annisokay) – 4:24
2. "Ascent of the Blessed" – 4:05
3. "Virus" (featuring Marcus Bischoff (Heaven Shall Burn) – 3:55
4. "Phantom Pain" – 4:02
5. "Alien" – 3:34
6. "Swords" – 3:50
7. "Darkness I Became" – 4:00
8. "Dragon" (featuring Jonny Davy (Job for a Cowboy) – 3:25
9. "Hibernate" – 4:18
10. "Mother" – 4:06
11. "The World Breaks Everyone" – 4:02
12. "Divided" – 4:06
