= Callejon (band) =

German metalcore band

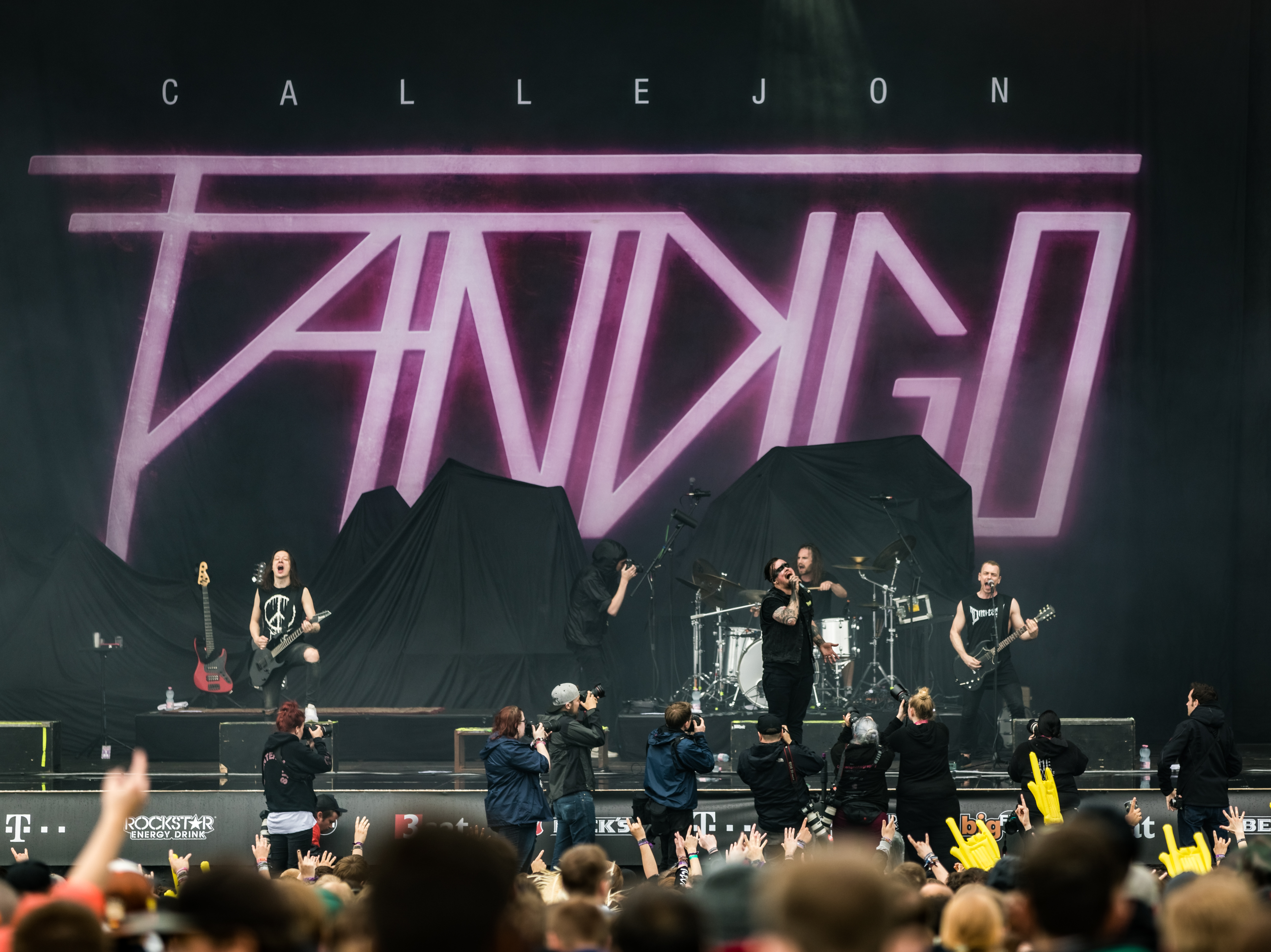
- Callejon at Rock am Ring 2018

Background information
- Origin: Düsseldorf, Germany
- Genre: Metalcore
- Years active: 2002–present
- Labels: My Favourite Toy, Nuclear Blast, Four Music
- Members: Bastian Sobtzick; Thorsten Becker; Alan Kassab; Denis Milenkovic; Daniel Pampuch
- Past members: Frank Walther; Simon Vohberger; Stefan Vohberger; Sebastian Gallinat; Sven Wasel; Thomas Buschhausen; Bernhard Horn; Christoph Koterzina; Max Kotzmann
- Website: callejon.de

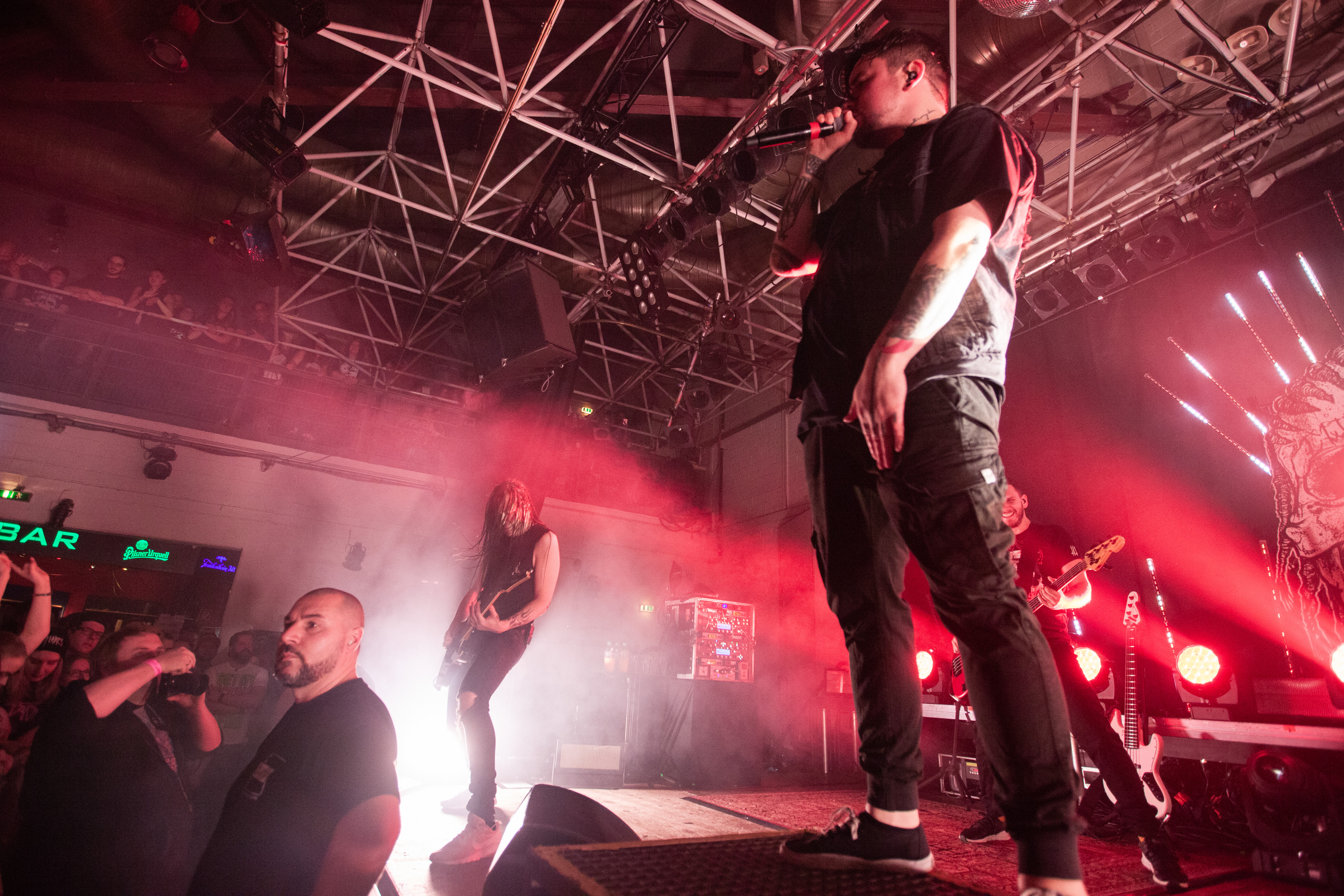
Singer Bastian "BastiBasti" Sobtzick

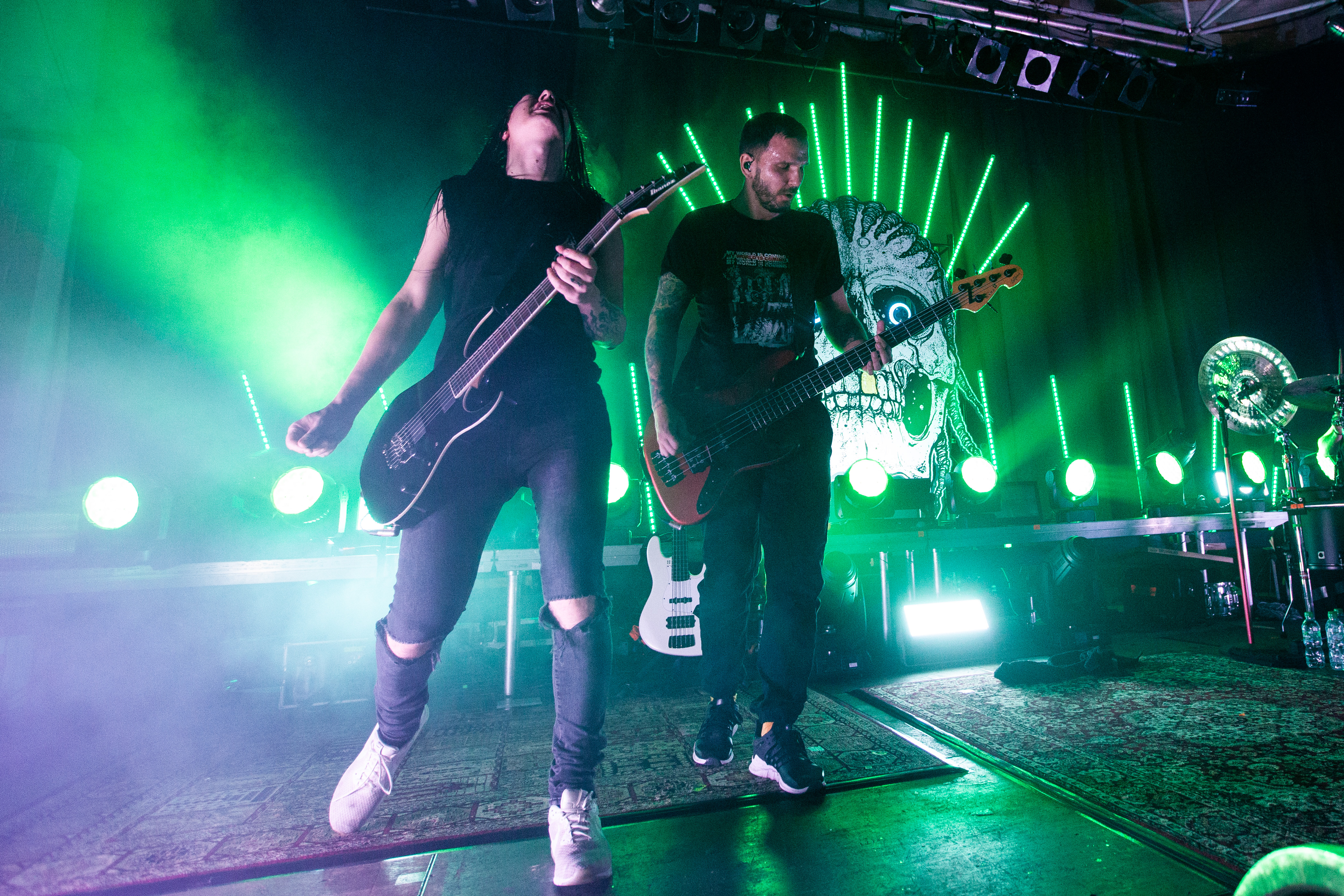
Former guitarist Bernhard Horn and bassist Thorsten Becker

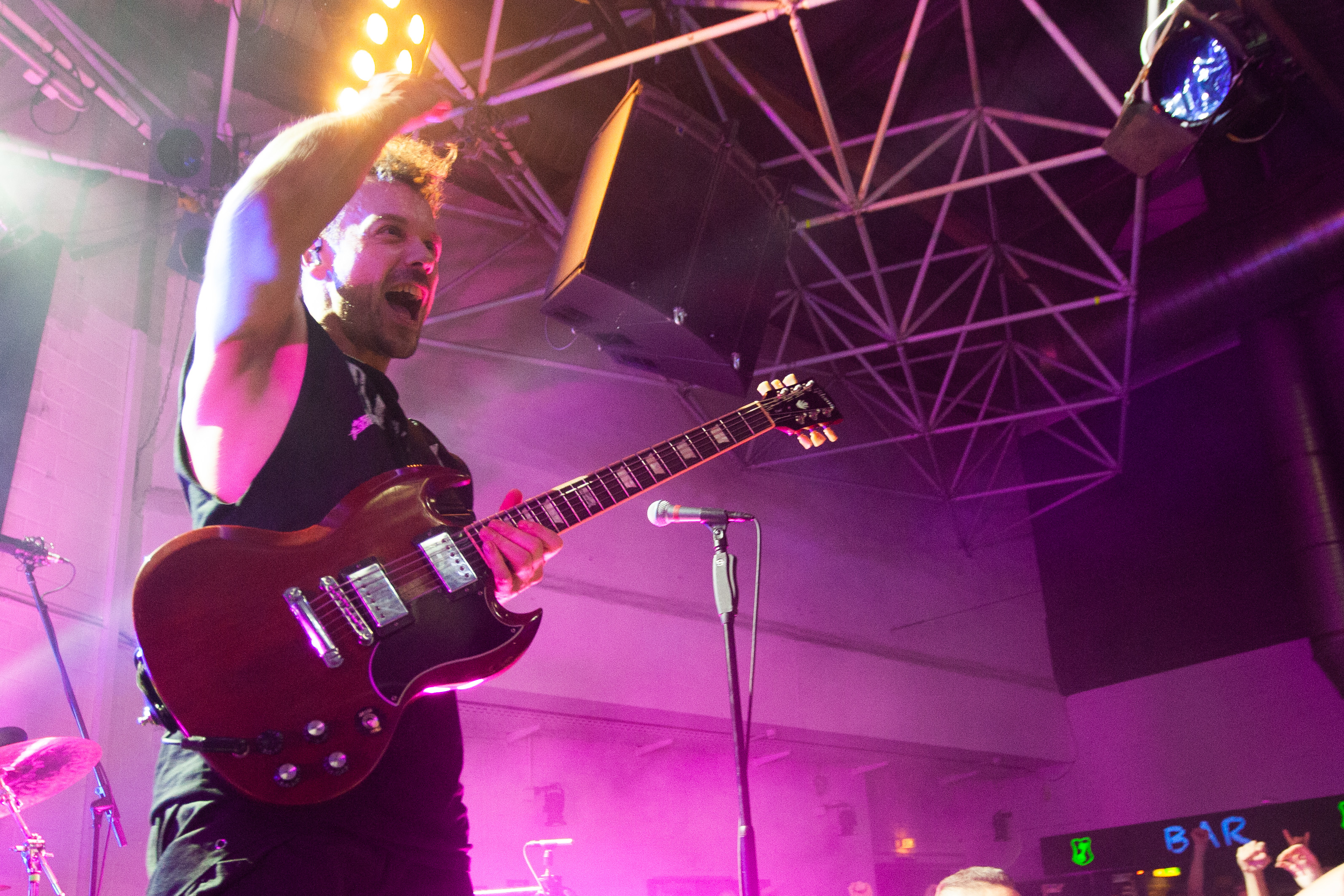
Former guitarist Christoph "Kotsche" Koterzina

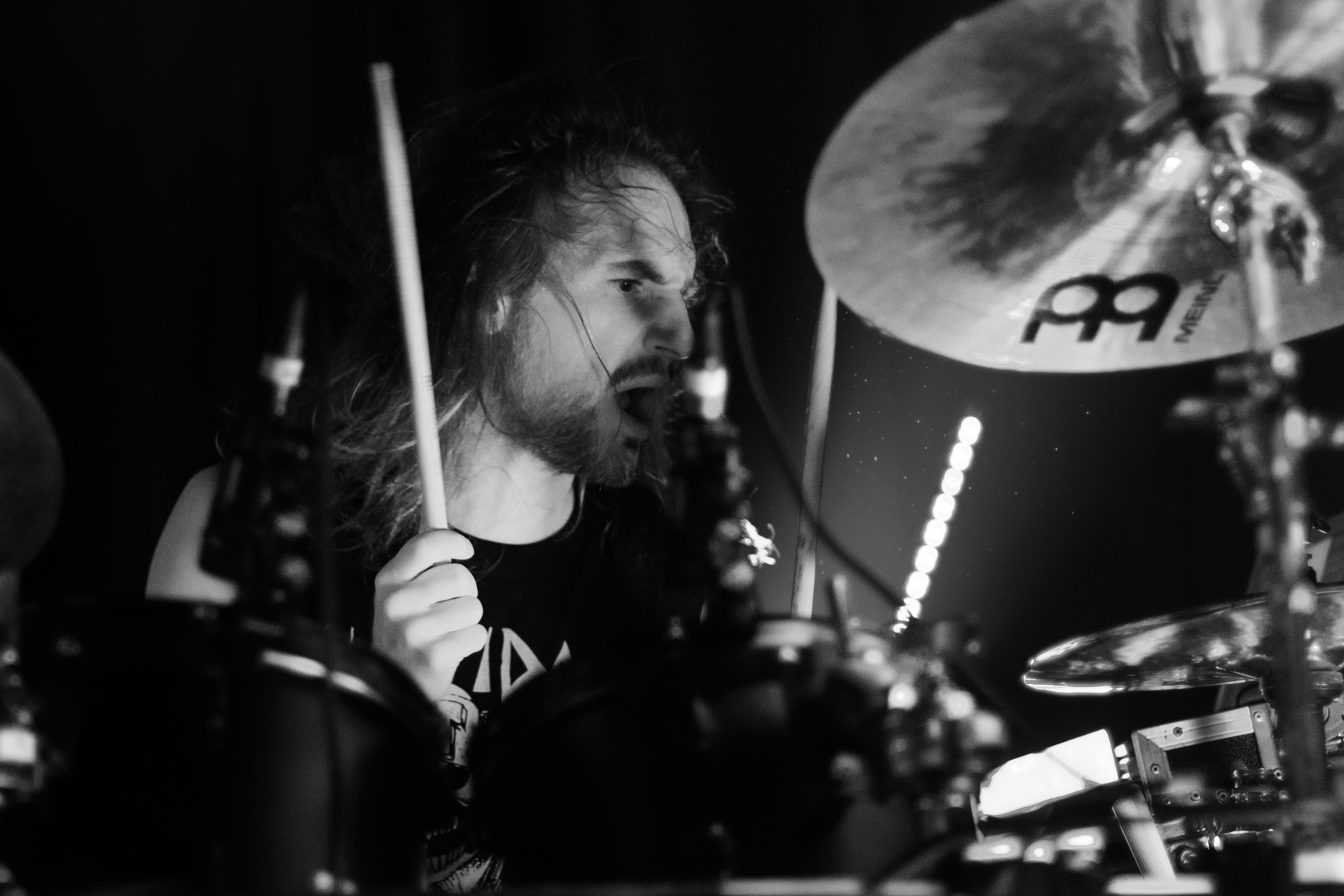
Former drummer Maximilian "Kotze" Kotzmann

Callejon (Spanish callejón "alley", [ka.ʎeˈxon]) is a German metalcore band founded in Düsseldorf in 2002. The band writes and sings the majority of their lyrics in German.

== History ==
Callejon was founded in 2002. Their first release was a self-titled demo released in 2003. On 7 May 2005, the band released their EP Chronos. Their debut album, Willkommen im Beerdigungscafé, was released on 7 July 2006. Both albums were released through their label My Favorite Toy Records, which is based in Mainz.

In February 2003, the band went on a three-weeks promotional tour for their album Willkommen im Beerdigungscafé.

In September 2007, they signed a contract with Edition TAKK, a publishing company associated with Sony/ATV Music Publishing Germany. With a tour in winter 2007 the EP Fauler Zauber Dunkelherz was promoted. After that drummer Sven Wasel was replaced by Bodo Stricker.

In May 2008, the band signed a contract with Nuclear Blast. Their label debut Zombieactionhauptquartier contained 13 songs. It was produced by Eike Freese in Hamburg and was published on 28 November 2008. The album features a song "Porn from Spain" with K.I.Z rapping as guest singers.

In March 2010, the band uploaded their third album Videodrom to their Myspace page. It was released on 3 April 2010 and entered the German Media Control Charts at No. 31. The album is inspired by David Cronenberg's film Videodrome.

Their album Blitzkreuz, produced by Colin Richardson, was released in June 2012. A video for the first single "Blitzkreuz" has been released on 12 April. The album contains "Porn from Spain 2", this time additionally to K.I.Z with Mille from Kreator and Sebastian Madsen from Madsen.

With their album Man spricht Deutsch they released an album consisting only of cover versions in January 2013.

In 2015, a new album called Wir sind Angst, this time exclusively with own songs, was released. It contains a song named Dunkelherz, which points back to the 2007 tour.

It was followed by Fandigo, which introduced a change of style. The newer songs contain more synthesized and melodic parts than older ones, the songs became slightly softer whilst maintaining hard riffs.

In succession to Man spricht Deutsch, Callejon released Hartgeld im Club in 2019. It mainly consists of covers of German rap music, although some own songs and features are included. It also contains a third "Porn from Spain"-Song featuring Ice-T and K.I.Z.

In May 2020, the band announced a new album entitled "Metropolis", which was released on 28 August 2020. The album was stated to be inspired by Fritz Lang's film of the same name. The first song of the album, also of the same name, was released three months prior on 29 May 2020. Singer BastiBasti directed the accompanying music video. On 31 July, a second single was released titled "Gottficker" with accompanying music video also directed by BastiBasti.

== Artwork ==
Singer Bastian "BastiBasti" Sobtzick creates all cover artwork of the band himself. He has also designed artwork for releases by other bands such as Iconoclast by Heaven Shall Burn, Say Hello to Tragedy by Caliban and others.

== Personnel ==
Current members

- Bastian "BastiBasti" Sobtzick – vocals (2002–present)
- Thorsten Becker – bass (2006–present)
- Alan Kassab – guitar (2024–present)
- Denis Milenkovic – guitar (2024–present)
- Daniel Pampuch – drums (2024–present)

Former members

- Bernhard Horn – guitar (2002–2024)
- Sebastian Gallinat (2002–2004, died 2010) – bass
- Stefan Vohberger – guitar (2002–2006)
- Sven Wasel – drums (2002–2007)
- Frank Walther – bass (2004–2006)
- Simon Vohberger – bass (2006)
- Thomas Buschhausen – guitar (2007–2011)
- Christoph "Kotsche" Koterzina– guitar (2011–2024)
- Max "Kotze" Kotzmann – drums (2010–2024)

== Discography ==
Callejon discography
- Studio albums: 8
- Extended plays: 2
- Live albums: 1
- Singles: 12
- Demo albums: 1

Studio albums

List of studio albums, with selected chart positions
Year	Album details	Peak chart positions	
Year	Album details	GER	AUT
2006	Willkommen im Beerdigungscafé: Released: July 6, 2006; Label: My Favourite Toy; Format: CD, digital download	—	—
2008	Zombieactionhauptquartier: Released: November 21, 2008; Label: Nuclear Blast; Format: CD, digital download	—	—
2010	Videodrom: Released: April 3, 2010; Label: Nuclear Blast; Format: CD, digital download	31	—
2012	Blitzkreuz: Released: June 16, 2012; Label: Four Music, Blacksome Music; Format: CD, digital download	9	32
2013	Man spricht Deutsch: Released: January 11, 2013; Label: Four Music; Format: CD, digital download	7	61
2015	Wir sind Angst: Released: January 9, 2015; Label: Four Music; Format: CD, digital download	5	24
2017	Fandigo: Released: July 28, 2017; Label: People Like You Records; Format: CD, digital download	9	27
2019	Hartgeld im Club: Released: January 4, 2019; Label: People Like You Records; Format: CD, digital download	5	63
2020	Metropolis: Released: August 28, 2020; Label: Warner Music Germany; Format: CD, digital download	7	25
2022	Eternia: Released: October 28, 2022; Label: Warner Music Germany; Format: CD, digital download	9	—
"—" denotes a recording that did not chart or was not released in that territory.

EPs

List of EPs
Year	EP details
2005	Chronos: Released: February 7, 2005; Label: My Favourite Toy; Format: CD, digital download
2007	Fauler Zauber Dunkelherz: Released: December 1, 2007; Label: independent; Format: CD, digital download

Singles

- 2008: Zombiefied / Porn from Spain
- 2009: Phantomschmerz
- 2010: Sommer, Liebe, Kokain
- 2011: Wherever I May Roam
- 2012: Feindliche Übernahme
- 2012: Porn from Spain 2
- 2012: Kind im Nebel
- 2014: Dunkelherz
- 2017: Utopia
- 2017: Monroe
- 2017: Noch einmal
- 2017: Hölle Stufe 4
- 2018: Urlaub fürs Gehirn
- 2018: Palmen aus Plastik
- 2018: Von Party zu Party
- 2018: Was du Liebe nennst
- 2018: Porn from Spain 3
- 2020: Metropolis
- 2020: Gottficker

Demo albums

- 2003: Demo 2003

Live albums

- 2015: Live in Köln
