= The Undying Darkness =

Studio album by Caliban
- Released: 4 April 2006
- Recorded: September–October 2005
- Studio: Principal Studios, Senden, Germany
- Genre: Metalcore
- Length: 46:12
- Label: Abacus
- Producer: Anders Fridén

Caliban chronology
The Split Program II (2005)	The Undying Darkness (2006)	The Awakening (2007)

Professional ratings
Review scores
Source	Rating
AllMusic	3/5 stars
Blabbermouth.net	6/10
Punknews.org	2/5 stars
Sputnikmusic	3.0/5

The Undying Darkness is the fifth studio album by German metalcore band Caliban. It was released on 4 April 2006 by German record label Abacus Recordings.

== Track listing ==
All lyrics are written by Dörner; all music is composed by Görtz.

No.	Title	Writer(s)	Length
1.	"Intro"		1:05
2.	"I Rape Myself"		3:25
3.	"Song About Killing"		3:21
4.	"It's Our Burden to Bleed"		3:50
5.	"Nothing Is Forever"		3:56
6.	"Together Alone"		3:12
7.	"My Fiction Beauty"		4:42
8.	"No More 2nd Chances"		4:06
9.	"I Refuse to Keep On Living..."		5:06
10.	"Sick of Running Away"		3:47
11.	"Moment of Clarity"		2:41
12.	"Army of Me" (Björk cover)	Björk, Massey	3:33
13.	"Room of Nowhere"		3:44
Total length:			46:12

== Credits ==
Writing, performance and production credits are adapted from the album's liner notes.

=== Personnel ===
==== Caliban ====
- Andy Dörner – vocals
- Marc Görtz – lead guitar
- Denis Schmidt – rhythm guitar, clean vocals
- Marco Schaller – bass, backing vocals
- Patrick Grün – drums

==== Additional musicians ====
- Benjamin Richter – keyboard, sampling
- Bony Fertigmensch – additional bass
- "Mille" Petrozza – additional vocals on "Moment of Clarity"
- Tanja Keilen – additional vocals on "Army of Me"
- Sky Hoff (Machinemade God) – additional guitar on "Nothing Is Forever" and "Army of Me"
- Ben Fink – background vocals on "It's Our Burden to Bleed" and "No More 2nd Chances"
- Marcel Hilgenstock – background vocals on "It's Our Burden to Bleed" and "No More 2nd Chances"
- Björn Esser – background vocals on "It's Our Burden to Bleed" and "No More 2nd Chances"
- Flo Velten (ex-Machinemade God) – background vocals on "It's Our Burden to Bleed" and "No More 2nd Chances"
- Pete – background vocals on "It's Our Burden to Bleed" and "No More 2nd Chances"

==== Production ====
- Anders Fridén – production, recording
- Andy Sneap (Sabbat) – mixing, mastering

==== Artwork and design ====
- Mike D'Antonio – artwork, layout

=== Studios ===
- Principal Studios, Senden, Germany – production, recording
- Backstage Production, Ripley, England – mixing, mastering

== Charts ==
Chart	Peak position
German Albums (Offizielle Top 100)	73
UK Rock & Metal Albums (OCC)	12
