= Say Hello to Tragedy =

Studio album by Caliban
- Released: 25 August 2009
- Recorded: 2009
- Genre: Metalcore
- Length: 50:01
- Label: Century Media
- Producer: Benny Richter

Caliban chronology
| The Awakening (2007) | Say Hello to Tragedy (2009) | I Am Nemesis (2012) |

Say Hello to Tragedy is the seventh studio album by Caliban. The album was released on 25 August 2009 (US), with Century Media Records.

"24 Years", the lead single from Say Hello to Tragedy was released on 17 July on the band's Myspace. A second song, "Caliban's Revenge" was released on their Myspace page on 24 July. A full album stream was put up on 13 August. A video was also made for "24 Years" and "Caliban's Revenge".

The album entered the German Media Control chart at No. 36.

The concept of Say Hello to Tragedy comes from questioning why tragedies happen nowadays that could have been prevented.

Guitarist Marc Goertz commented, "If people would just open their eyes and at least care a bit about their neighbours, relatives and the world in general, a lot of this adversity could be avoided. Some of our new songs are entirely fictional, whereas other ones refer to real life dramas like the Fritzl case."

== Track listing ==
All music written by Marc Görtz. All lyrics written by Andreas Dörner except where noted.

| No. | Title | Lyrics | Length |
|---|---|---|---|
| 1. | "24 Years" | | 3:49 |
| 2. | "Love Song" | | 3:28 |
| 3. | "Caliban's Revenge" | | 4:00 |
| 4. | "End This Sickness" | | 4:18 |
| 5. | "Walk Like the Dead" | Andreas Dörner, Marc Görtz | 4:18 |
| 6. | "No One is Safe" | | 3:43 |
| 7. | "Liar" | | 4:40 |
| 8. | "The Denegation of Humanity" | | 4:08 |
| 9. | "Unleash Your Voice" | | 3:37 |
| 10. | "All I Gave" | Marc Görtz | 5:26 |
| 11. | "In the Name of Progression" (Unbroken cover) | | 4:48 |
| 12. | "Coma" | | 3:49 |
| Total length: | | | 50:01 |

- Track 8 is mistakenly written as "The Degenation Of Humanity".

Limited Digipak Edition
| No. | Title | Length |
|---|---|---|
| 13. | "Forsaken Horizon" (Live at With Full Force 4th of July 2008) | 3:17 |
| 14. | "Between the Worlds" (Live at With Full Force 4th of July 2008) | 4:08 |
| Total length: | | 57:24 |

== Credits ==
Caliban

- Andreas Dörner – Lead vocals
- Marc Görtz – Lead Guitar
- Denis Schmidt – Rhythm Guitar; Clean Vocals
- Marco Schaller Bass; Backing Vocals
- Patrick Grun – Drums

Guest musicians

- Vocals – Dennis Diehl (The Mercury Arc) on "Liar"
- Vocals – Florian Velten (ex-Machinemade God) on "Love Song"
- Guitar – Sky Hoff guitar solo on "The Degenation of Humanity"

Additional

- Co-Production – Marc Görtz
- Recording – Benny Richter; Sky Hoff; Toni Meloni
- Mixing – Adam D.
- Mastering – Vince
- Artwork – Bastian Sobtzick (Callejon)

== Charts ==
| Chart (2009) | Peak position |
|---|---|
| Austrian Albums (Ö3 Austria) | 64 |
| German Albums (Offizielle Top 100) | 36 |
| Swiss Albums (Schweizer Hitparade) | 87 |
