= Zombieactionhauptquartier =

Studio album by Callejon
- Released: 21 November 2008
- Genre: Metalcore
- Length: 57:58
- Label: Nuclear Blast

Callejon chronology
Fauler Zauber Dunkelherz (2007)	Zombieactionhauptquartier (2008)	Videodrom (2010)

Professional ratings
Review scores
Source	Rating
Kerrang!	3/5 stars

Zombieactionhauptquartier ("Zombie Action Headquarters") is the second studio album by German metalcore band Callejon.

== Track listing ==
No.	Title	Length
1.	"ZAHQ"	1:03
2.	"Zombiefied"	3:27
3.	"Spiel mir das Lied vom Sterben" ("Play the Song of Death for Me"; wordplay on the German title for Once Upon a Time in the West)	4:34
4.	"Und wenn der Schnee" ("And When the Snow...")	3:23
5.	"Mein Puls = 0" ("My Pulse = 0")	3:27
6.	"Tanz der Teufel" ("Dance of the Devil" or German title for the film Evil Dead)	3:35
7.	"Phantomschmerz" ("Phantom Pain")	4:56
8.	"Quarantäne" ("Quarantine")	1:47
9.	"Infiziert" ("Infected")	4:04
10.	"Der Tag, an dem die Schwärze blieb" ("The Day the Darkness Stayed")	5:06
11.	"Fremdkörper" ("Foreign Object")	4:09
12.	"Das Ende von John Wayne" ("The End of John Wayne")	4:00
13.	"Porn from Spain" (feat. K.I.Z) (includes hidden song "In dunklen Wassern" ("In Dark Waters"), which starts at 10:10)	14:27
Total length:		57:58
