= Zeitgeister =

Studio album by Caliban
- Released: 14 May 2021
- Genre: Metalcore
- Length: 32:05
- Language: German
- Label: Century Media
- Producers: Benny Richter, Marc Görtz

Caliban chronology
Elements (2018)	Zeitgeister (2021)	Dystopia (2022)

Professional ratings
Review scores
Source	Rating
Heavymetal.dk	3/10
Metal.de	7/10
MMH-Radio	3.5/5 stars

Zeitgeister is the twelfth studio album by German metalcore band Caliban, released on 14 May 2021 through Century Media Records. The album consists of re-recorded versions of songs from their earlier albums, with new song titles and lyrics, all in German. It also contains two new tracks; the title intro and the previously unreleased song, "nICHts".

Music videos were released for some tracks including "Nichts ist für immer". The album has received positive feedback from reviewers.

== Track listing ==
All lyrics are written by Andreas Dörner; all music is composed by Marc Görtz.

No.	Title	Original song	Length
1.	"Zeitgeister"		1:18
2.	"Trauma"	Arena of Concealment	3:19
3.	"Herz"	I Will Never Let You Down	3:29
4.	"Ausbruch nach Innen"	Tyranny of Small Misery	4:12
5.	"Feuer, zieh' mit mir"	Between the Worlds	3:44
6.	"Nichts ist für immer"	All I Gave	3:49
7.	"Intoleranz"	Intolerance (Ignorance II)	3:42
8.	"Mein Inferno"	My Little Secret	3:40
9.	"nICHts"		4:06
Total length:			32:08

== Personnel ==
Caliban

- Andreas Dörner – lead vocals
- Marc Görtz – lead guitar
- Denis Schmidt – rhythm guitar, clean vocals
- Marco Schaller – bass guitar
- Patrick Grün – drums

Guest musicians

- Matthi Nasty – vocals on "Trauma"

Production

- Benny Richter – production
- Marc Görtz – production, recording, mixing
- Olman Viper – mastering
- Bastian Gerlach – cover artwork
- Matthias Löwenstein – art direction, graphic design

== Charts ==
Chart (2021)	Peak position
German Albums (Offizielle Top 100)	15
