= Blitzkreuz =

Studio album by Callejon
- Released: 15 June 2012
- Genre: Metalcore, post-hardcore
- Label: Blacksome Music, Four Music

Callejon chronology
Videodrom (2010)	Blitzkreuz (2012)	Man spricht Deutsch (2013)

Blitzkreuz is the fourth studio album by German metalcore band Callejon. It entered the German Media Control Charts at number 9.

== Track listing ==
All tracks are written by Callejon.

No.	Title	Length
1.	"Blitzkreuz" (Lightning Cross)	3:54
2.	"Kojote U.G.L.Y." (Coyote U.G.L.Y.)	3:24
3.	"Meine Liebe" (My Love)	3:37
4.	"Atlantis"	5:11
5.	"Vergissmeinnicht" (Forget-Me-Not)	3:43
6.	"Porn from Spain II" (featuring Nico, Mille Petrozza & Sebastian Madsen)	3:43
7.	"Bevor du gehst" (Before You Leave)	3:57
8.	"Polar"	4:12
9.	"Was bleibt seid ihr" (What Remains Are (All of) You)	3:42
10.	"Bring mich fort" (Take Me Away)	3:37
11.	"Kind im Nebel" (Child in the Mist)	4:27
12.	"Klangfarbe schwarz" (Timbre Black; hidden track)	7:13

== Credits ==
Guest musicians

- K.I.Z on "Porn from Spain 2"
- "Mille" Petrozza (Kreator) on "Porn from Spain 2"
- Sebastian Madsen (Madsen) on "Porn from Spain 2"

== Charts ==
Chart	Peak position
Austrian Albums (Ö3 Austria)	32
German Albums (Offizielle Top 100)	9
