= Back from Hell (Caliban album) =

Studio album by Caliban
- Released: 25 April 2025
- Genre: Metalcore
- Length: 41:29
- Label: Century Media

Caliban chronology
Dystopia (2022)	Back from Hell (2025)

Professional ratings
Review scores
Source	Rating
Chaoszine	4/5
Dead Rhetoric	7/10
Heavymetal.dk	3/10
Metal Hammer Germany	4.5/7
Metal.de	8/10
Powermetal.de	8.5/10
Rock Hard	8/10
Soundi	2/5
Twilight-Magazin	14/15
Vampster	Favourable
Visions	7/12

Back from Hell is the fourteenth studio album by the German metalcore band Caliban, released in 2025 by Century Media Records.

The album featured three guest vocalists, Lukas Nicolai (Mental Cruelty), Jonny McBee (The Browning) and Joe Bad (Fit For An Autopsy).

== Track listing ==
1. "Resurgence (Intro)" – 1:43
2. "Guilt Trip" (featuring Lukas Nicolai) – 3:05
3. "I Was a Happy Kid Once" – 3:24
4. "Back from Hell" (featuring Jonny McBee) – 3:21
5. "Insomnia" – 3:34
6. "Dear Suffering" (featuring Joe Bad) – 2:50
7. "Alte Seele" – 3:47
8. "Overdrive" – 2:37
9. "Infection" – 3:08
10. "Glass Cage" – 3:45
11. "Solace in Suffer" – 3:45
12. "Till Death Do Us Part" – 3:06
13. "Echoes" – 3:24
