= Willkommen im Beerdigungscafé =

Studio album by Callejon
- Released: 7 July 2006
- Genre: Metalcore
- Label: My Favourite Toy
- Producer: Andreas Vieten

Callejon chronology
Chronos (EP) (2005)	Willkommen im Beerdigungscafé (2006)	Fauler Zauber Dunkelherz (2007)

Willkommen im Beerdigungscafé (German for "welcome to the funeral café") is the first studio album by German metalcore band Callejon. It was released on 7 July 2006 through record label My Favourite toy. The CD version was issued in a standard jewel case package with white CD tray and a sixteen-page booklet.

== Track listing ==
No.	Title	Length
1.	"Eingang ("Entrance")"	0:20
2.	"Es regnet ("It Rains")"	2:57
3.	"Erkenntnis ("Insight")"	2:46
4.	"Bitter macht lustig ("Bitter Makes (You) Funny")"	2:49
5.	"1000 Winter fauler Tau (1000 Winter Rotten Thaw")"	3:26
6.	"Love sucks"	3:30
7.	"Snake Mountain"	1:51
8.	"Astronaut"	2:11
9.	"Mirage"	3:17
10.	"...Und die Sterne sagen: Es werde Licht ("...And the Stars Say: Let There Be Light")"	2:47
11.	"22 Teile ("22 Parts")"	2:42
Total length:		28:44
