= Videodrom =

Studio album by Callejon
- Released: 3 April 2010
- Genre: Metalcore
- Length: 50:02
- Label: Nuclear Blast

Callejon chronology
Zombieactionhauptquartier (2008)	Videodrom (2010)	Blitzkreuz (2012)

Professional ratings
Review scores
Source	Rating
Hallowed	3/7
Powermetal.de	7.5/10
Stormbringer	5/5

Videodrom is the third studio album by the German metalcore band Callejon. It entered the German Media Control Charts at number 31.

== Track listing ==
No.	Title	Length
1.	"VI"	1:54
2.	"Videodrom"	3:35
3.	"Kinder der Nacht ("Children of the Night")"	3:25
4.	"Lass mich gehen ("Let Me Go")"	3:51
5.	"DE"	0:52
6.	"Immergrün ("Evergreen")"	3:14
7.	"Dein Leben schläft ("Your Life Is Sleeping")"	4:03
8.	"O"	0:41
9.	"Mondfinsternis ("Lunar Eclipse")"	4:34
10.	"Dieses Lied macht betroffen ("You Will Be Affected By This Song")"	3:01
11.	"Sexmachine"	4:05
12.	"DROM"	1:10
13.	"Mein Stein ("My Stone")"	3:16
14.	"Sommer, Liebe, Kokain ("Summer, Love, Cocaine")"	4:22
15.	"Gott ist tot ("God Is Dead")"	7:54
Total length:		50:02

== Charts ==
Chart (2010)	Peak position
German Albums (Offizielle Top 100)	31
