= I Am Nemesis =

Studio album by Caliban
- Released: 3 February 2012
- Recorded: 2011
- Studio: Level 3 Entertainment Studios
- Genre: Metalcore
- Length: 45:23
- Label: Century Media
- Producer: Benny Richter, Marc Görtz

Caliban chronology
Say Hello to Tragedy (2009)	I Am Nemesis (2012)	Ghost Empire (2014)

Professional ratings
Review scores
Source	Rating
About.com	3/5 stars
AllMusic	(positive)
Metal Temple	8/10

I Am Nemesis is the eighth full-length album by the German metalcore band Caliban, which was released on 3 February 2012 on Century Media.

== Background ==
Lyrically, I Am Nemesis is a continuation of the band's last record, Say Hello to Tragedy, and focuses on controversial and often overlooked world issues. The guitarist Marc Görtz told: "The album breaks new soil without forgetting our roots. There are new influences such as shimmering guitar melodies and technical grooves with Meshuggah-like heaviness. It was important to us to have an elaborate album without any fillers. Additionally, the sound of the album is the best we've ever had by far: it is heavy and brutal without being chaotic." Marcus Bischoff of Heaven Shall Burn and Mitch Lucker of Suicide Silence are confirmed as guest vocals.

== Release and promotion ==
The first track off the album "Memorial" premiered on 19 December, as a music video on the website Metal Hammer Germany., and the second single "Dein R3.ich" was released on 6 January 2012. The album entered the German Media Control chart at No. 21. Caliban promoted the album through their "Get Infected" Tour 2012 with support of Winds Of Plague, We Butter the Bread with Butter, Eyes Set To Kill and Attila which started off on 2 February in Karlsruhe, Germany. Due to personal reasons All Shall Perish had to cancel the tour, they were replaced by Winds of Plague.

== Track list ==
All songs written by Marc Görtz. All lyrics written by Andreas Dörner except where noted.

No.	Title	Lyrics	Length
1.	"We Are the Many"		4:01
2.	"The Bogeyman"		3:08
3.	"Memorial"		4:19
4.	"No Tomorrow"		3:26
5.	"Edge of Black"	Benny Richter	4:58
6.	"Davy Jones"	Marc Görtz	4:06
7.	"Deadly Dream"		4:02
8.	"Open Letter"		3:38
9.	"Dein R3.ich"		3:30
10.	"Broadcast to Damnation"		3:32
11.	"This Oath"		3:29
12.	"Modern Warfare"		3:22
13.	"Pulse" (The Mad Capsule Markets cover) (Japanese edition bonus track)		3:07
Total length:			45:23

Special/Limited Deluxe Box Set Edition Bonus CD – Coverfield Pt. II
No.	Title	Length
1.	"Shout at the Devil" (Mötley Crüe cover)	3:36
2.	"Sonne" (Rammstein cover)	3:47
3.	"Feasting on the Blood of the Insane" (Six Feet Under cover)	4:32
4.	"Die, Die My Darling" (Misfits cover)	3:45
5.	"Blinded by Fear" (At The Gates cover)	2:34
6.	"High Hopes" (Pink Floyd cover)	6:36
7.	"Among the Living" (Anthrax cover)	5:48
8.	"Edge of Black" (Remix)	3:31
Total length:		34:08

== Credits ==
Caliban

- Andreas Dörner – lead vocals
- Denis Schmidt – rhythm guitar, clean vocals
- Marc Görtz – lead guitar
- Marco Schaller – bass, backing vocals
- Patrick Grün – drums

Guest musicians

- Marcus Bischoff (Heaven Shall Burn) – guest vocals on "We Are the Many"
- Mitch Lucker (Suicide Silence) – guest vocals on "We Are the Many"
- Benny Richter (The Mercury Arc) – guest vocals on "We Are the Many", keyboards on "Dein R3.ich" and "The Bogeyman", production
- Christoph Koterzina – clean vocals on "Modern Warfare", backing vocals on "Open Letter"
- As Blood Runs Black – gang vocals

Production

- Marc Görtz – producer
- Klaus Scheuermann – mixing
- J. Oliver Wiebe – mastering
- Marcel Neumann – co-producer on "Dein R3.ich", "The Bogeyman" and "Deadly Dream"
- Mark K. Kraemer for Twenty-Dirt – artwork

== Release history ==
Region	Date
Austria	3 February 2012
Germany	3 February 2012
Norway	3 February 2012
Switzerland	3 February 2012
Belgium	6 February 2012
Denmark	6 February 2012
France	6 February 2012
Greece	6 February 2012
Luxembourg	6 February 2012
Netherlands	6 February 2012
Portugal	6 February 2012
United Kingdom	6 February 2012
Italy	7 February 2012
Spain	7 February 2012
Finland	8 February 2012
Hungary	8 February 2012
Sweden	8 February 2012
Australia	10 February 2012
New Zealand	10 February 2012
United States	28 February 2012

== Charts ==
Chart (2012)	Peak position
Austrian Albums (Ö3 Austria)	47
German Albums (Offizielle Top 100)	21
Swiss Albums (Schweizer Hitparade)	61
