= Caliban (band) =

German metalcore band

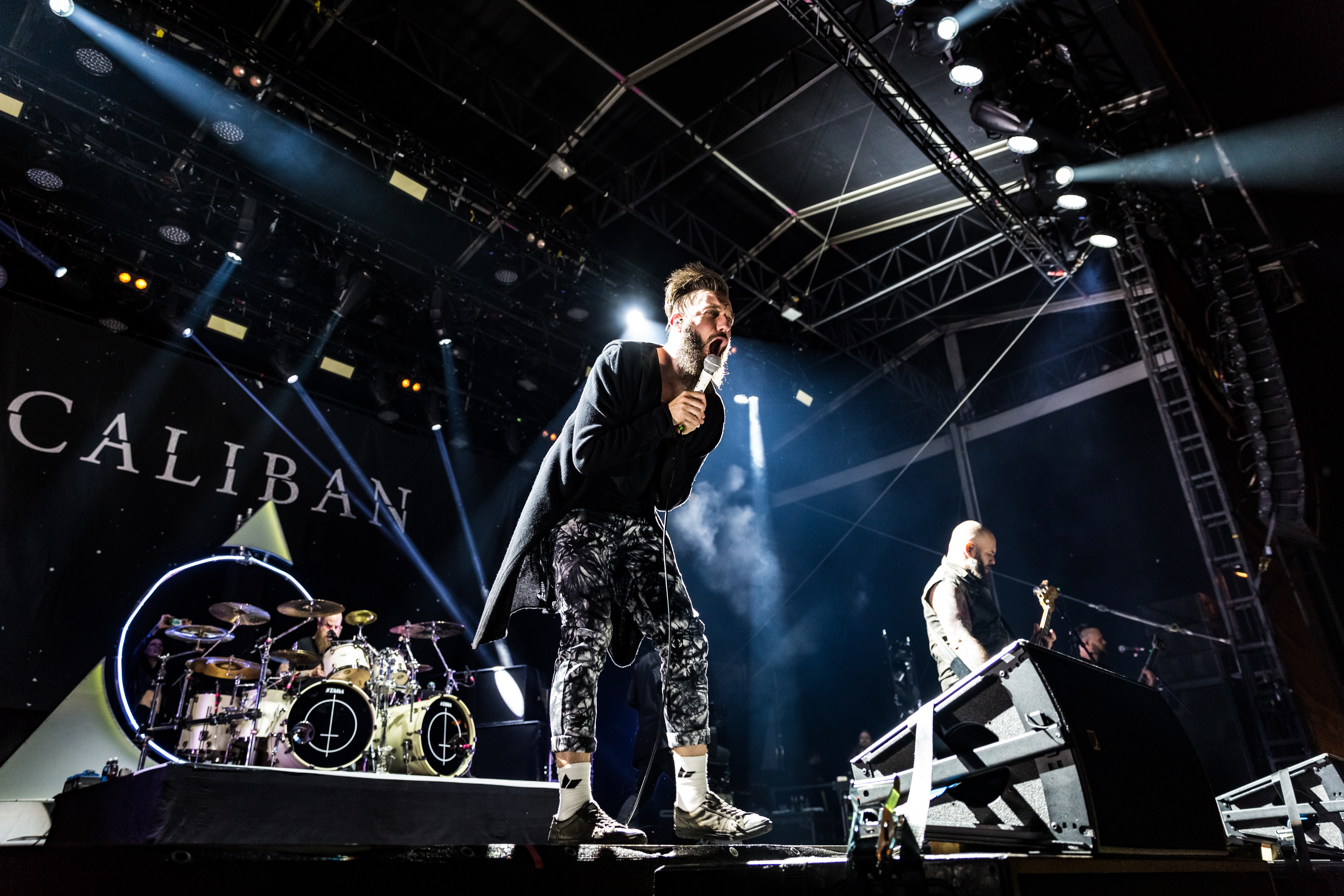
- Caliban at Rock am Ring 2018

Background information
- Also known as: Never Again (1997–1998)
- Origin: Hattingen, Germany
- Genre: Metalcore
- Years active: 1997–present
- Labels: Lifeforce, Roadrunner, Abacus, Century Media
- Members: Andreas Dörner; Denis Schmidt; Marc Görtz; Patrick Grün; Kenneth Iain Duncan
- Past members: Marc Ulfig; Björn Kaiser; Kai Kogelheide; Claus Wilgenbusch; Thomas Sielemann; Andreas Nikolaou; Engin Güres; Robert Krämer; Boris Pracht; Marco Schaller
- Website: calibanmetal.com

Caliban are a German metalcore band from Essen. To date, they have released thirteen studio albums and two EPs, along with two split albums with Heaven Shall Burn.

== History ==
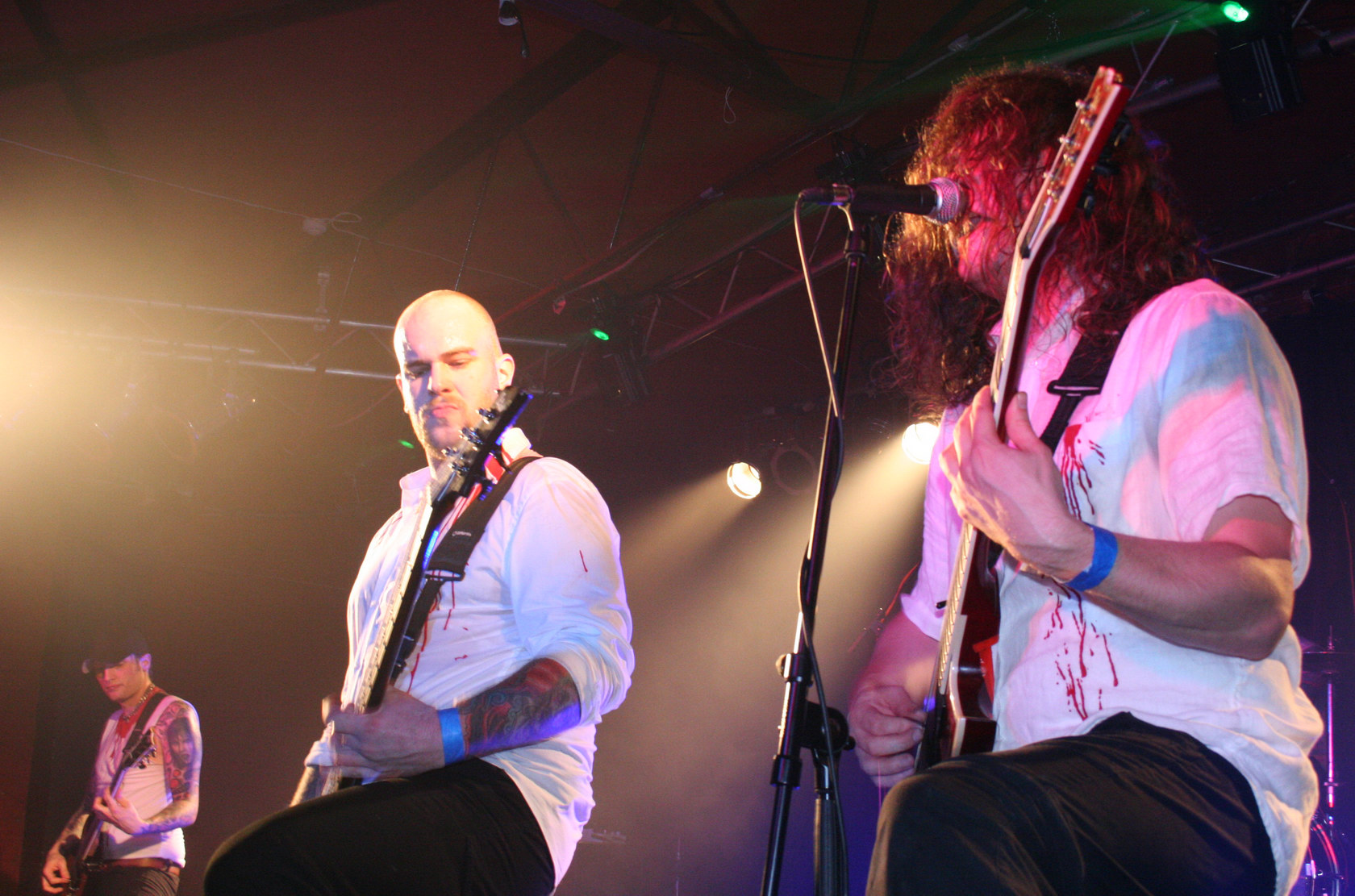
Caliban in 2007

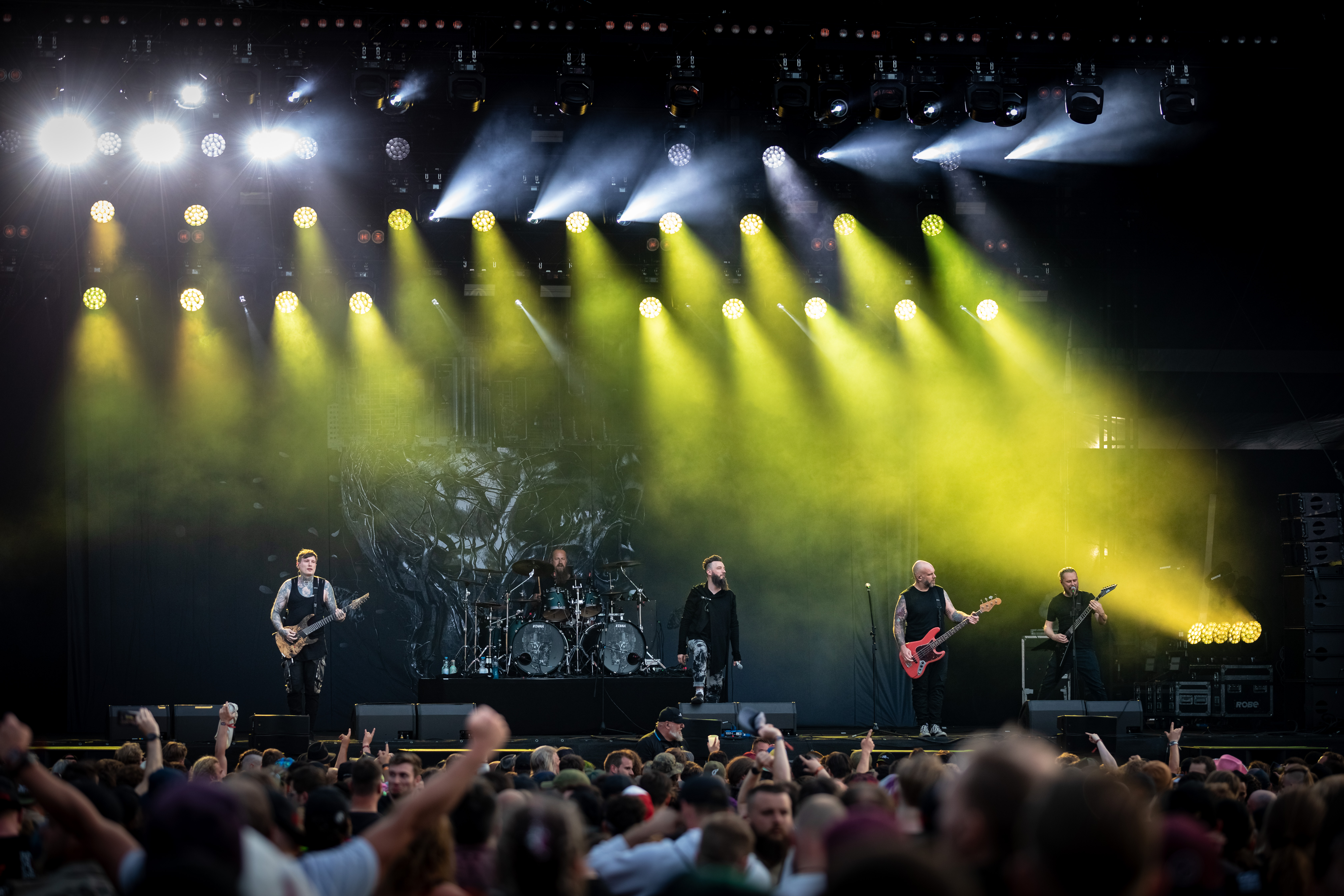
Caliban live bei Rock am Ring 2022

Caliban was formed in Hattingen, Germany in 1997 as Never Again, performing at local school events and recording a self-titled four-track demo tape. They also briefly performed as Menace to Society, playing at the 1997 Open Air am Berg in Eichstätt. In the beginning, the band consisted of vocalists Andreas Dörner and Marc Ulfig, guitarists Björn Kaiser and Marc Görtz, bassist Engin Güres and drummer Kai Kogelheide. After six months of playing together and several member changes – Ulfig, Kaiser and Kogelheide left, the latter were replaced by Claus Wilgenbusch and Robert Krämer – the band recorded two songs for a demo, which was never released. The songs were sent to several record labels, and Lifeforce Records was the first to offer the band – by then called Caliban – a record deal. Caliban's first self-titled EP came out in the summer of 1998. To promote it, the band played many shows all over Europe and a few support shows for bands including Morning Again, Earth Crisis and Cro-Mags.

After their European tour in 1999, Caliban entered the studio to record their first full-length entitled A Small Boy and a Grey Heaven. The CD received favorable reviews in many big magazines and many smaller hardcore and metal zines. They also released the first part of a split-CD with Heaven Shall Burn, named The Split Program.

Vent came out in April 2001. Vent was released by Imperium Records and by Howling-Bull Records in Japan. Shortly after the release, Caliban was offered the opportunity to tour Japan to play the Beast-Feast 2001 in the Yokohama Arena, sharing stage with bands including Slayer, Pantera, Machine Head, Biohazard and Morbid Angel. The Japan trip was followed by a U.S. tour with Bloodjinn, which was interrupted by the September 11 attacks.

In August 2002, Caliban recorded their third official release Shadow Hearts. This record was more melodic and harmonic than its predecessors. In 2004 the band got a record deal with Roadrunner Records in Europe (Abacus Recordings in the US) and started to record their fourth album, The Opposite from Within, alongside producer Anders Fridén, who is known for fronting In Flames.

In July 2005, the band released the second part of their split-CD with their friends from Heaven Shall Burn, called The Split Program II. The band released their fifth album called The Undying Darkness in February 2006 and toured with All Shall Perish, Bleeding Through and I Killed the Prom Queen for the "Darkness over Europe" tour.

In 2007, Caliban recorded their album The Awakening with producer Benny Richter and it was released in Germany on 25 May. The album reached 36 in the German charts.

In 2009, the band toured with German band Kreator on the "Chaos Over Europe Tour". They also signed a worldwide contract with Century Media Records. They released their new album, Say Hello to Tragedy, on 25 August 2009. This album - just like The Awakening - reached 36th place on the German media charts. In October and November they toured Europe on the "Beastfest European Tour 2009" with Suicide Silence, German friend-band Maroon and American acts Emmure and After the Burial.

Caliban entered the studio in February and recorded a cover EP titled Coverfield, released in May 2011. The album consists of 4 songs, although more songs were recorded and may be released later. In mid August, the band entered the studio to finish writing and recording a new full-length album to be released in early 2012. At the beginning of September the band posted a message on their official site, saying that the songwriting is complete and that 12 songs were made. The new album titled I Am Nemesis was released on 3 February.

Stormbringer Magazin of Germany Caliban is writing and recording a new full-length album for January 2014. The band released Ghost Empire on 24 January 2014 via Century Media Records. In February 2014, Caliban entered the German Media Control Charts at #7 for this album. In the beginning of 2015 they toured with Bury Tomorrow, Dream On, Dreamer and Any Given Day.

Caliban then released the album, Gravity, in the spring of 2016, and via social media teased an upcoming project in 2017. On 6 April 2018, Caliban released their eleventh album, Elements. Three years after their previous album, Caliban release a new album titled Zeitgeister on May 14, 2021. This release reunites some old tracks now sung and re-recorded in German language. Additionally, Zeitgeister includes one previously unreleased song, "nICHts". The next year on April 22, the band released their 13th full-length album, titled Dystopia.

== Band members ==
Caliban live at Rockharz Open Air 2019

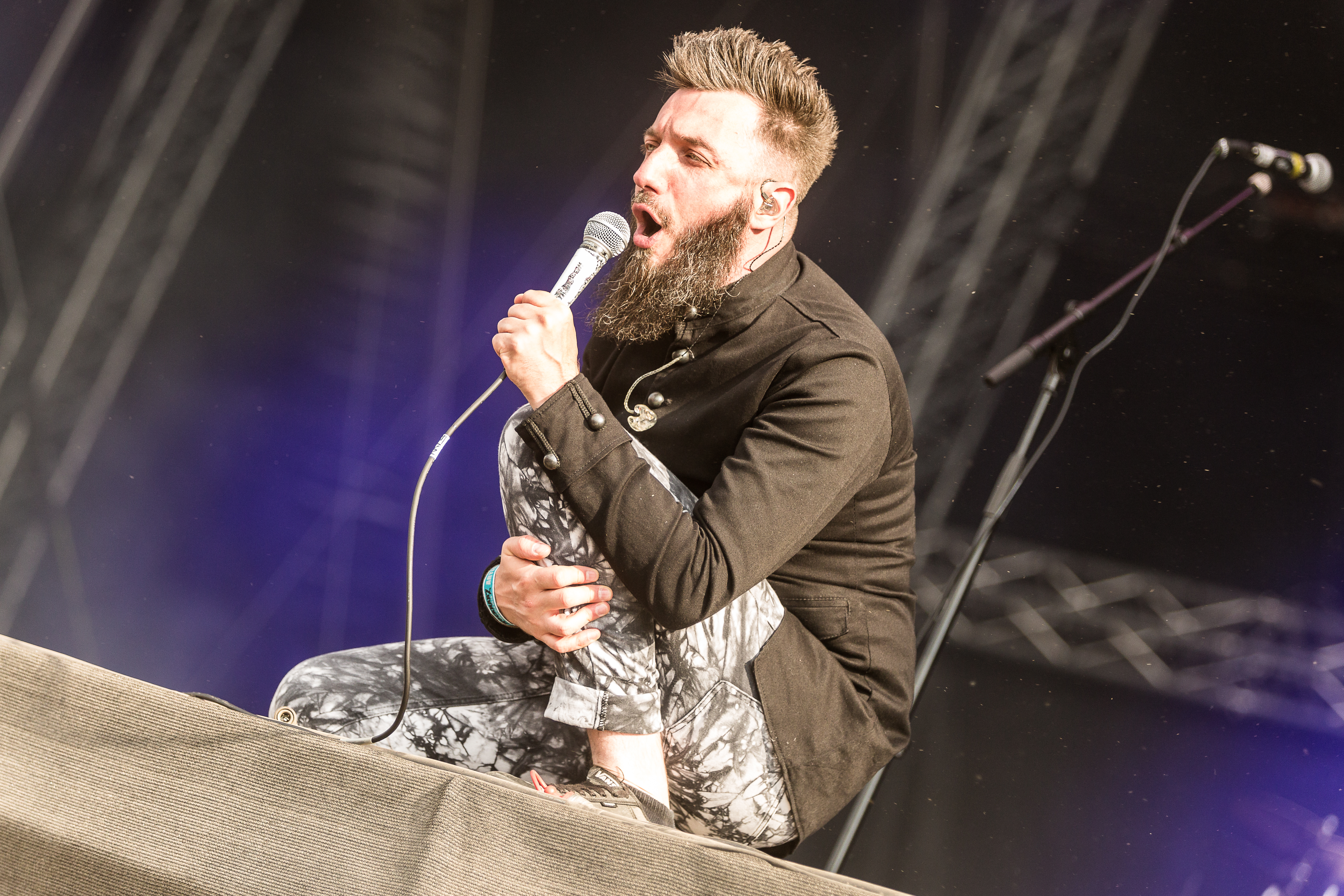
Andreas Dörner

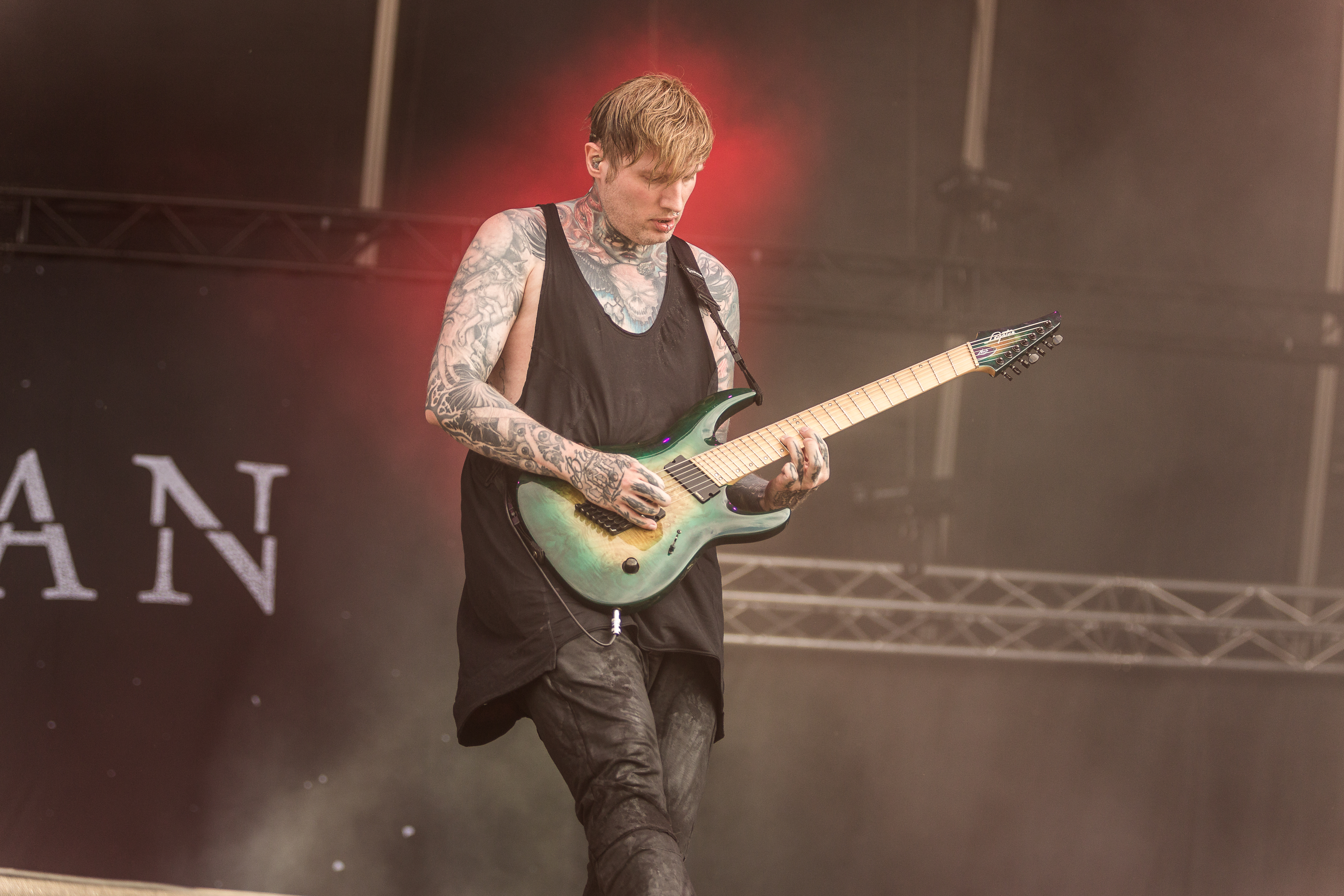
Marc Görtz

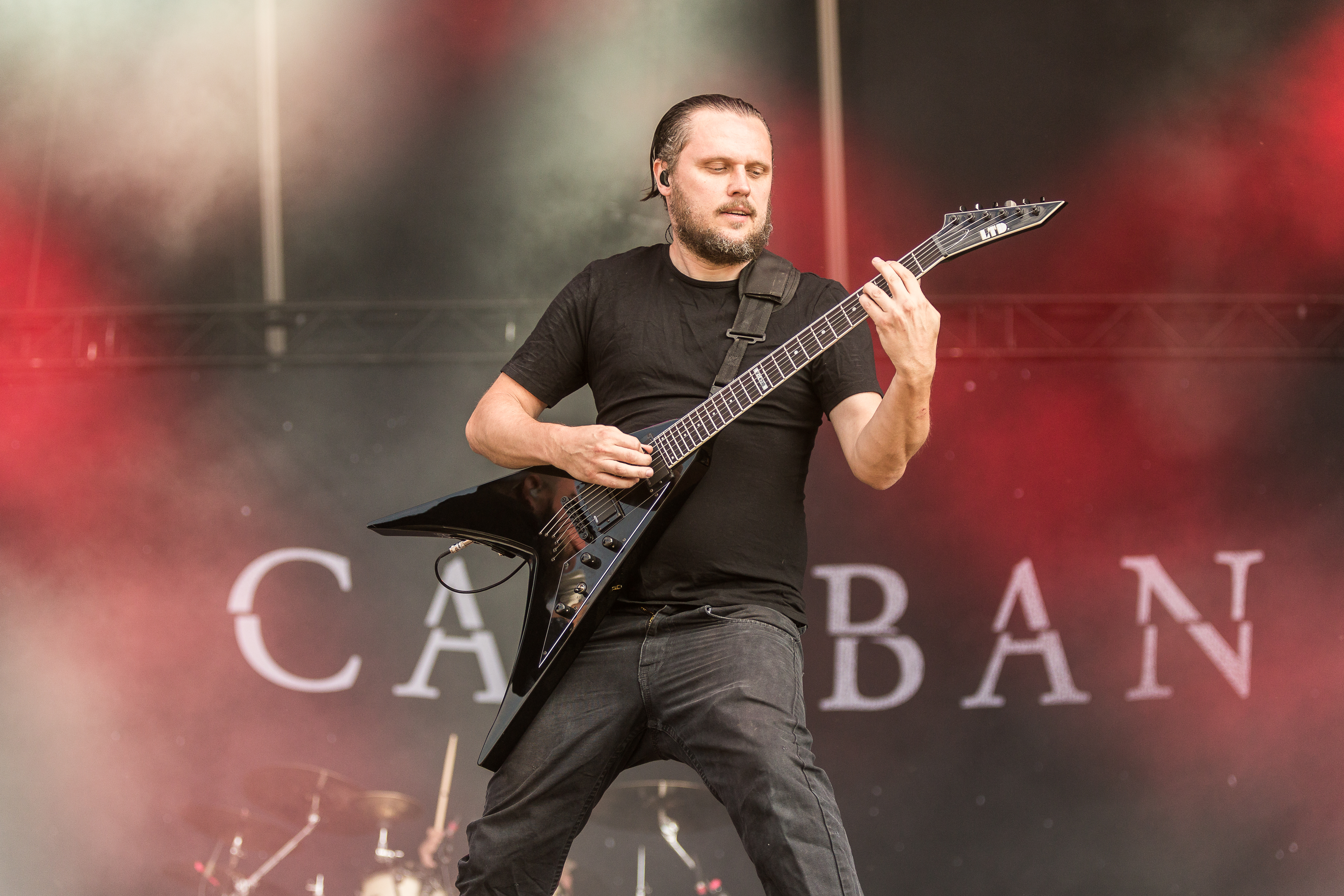
Denis Schmidt

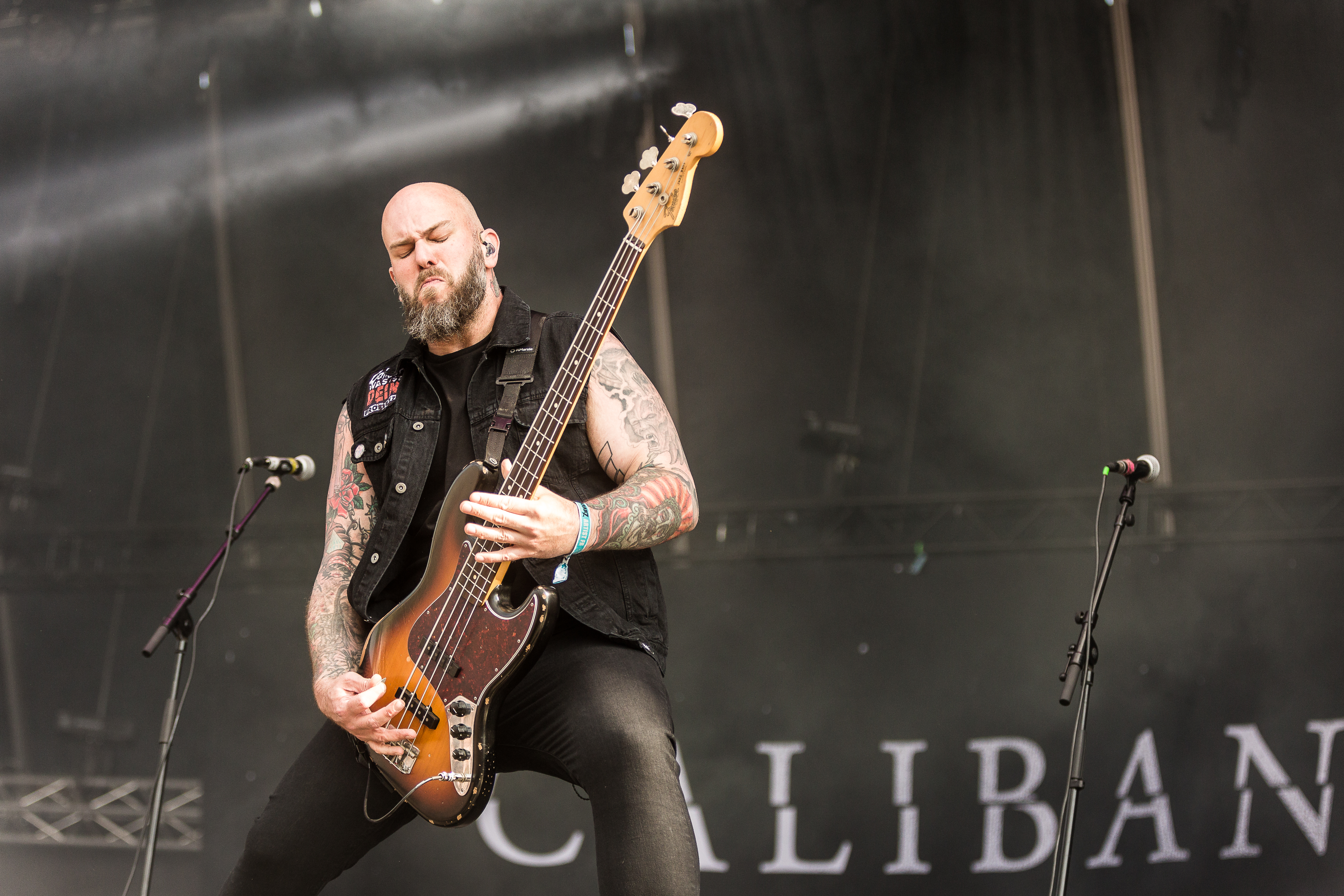
Marco Schaller

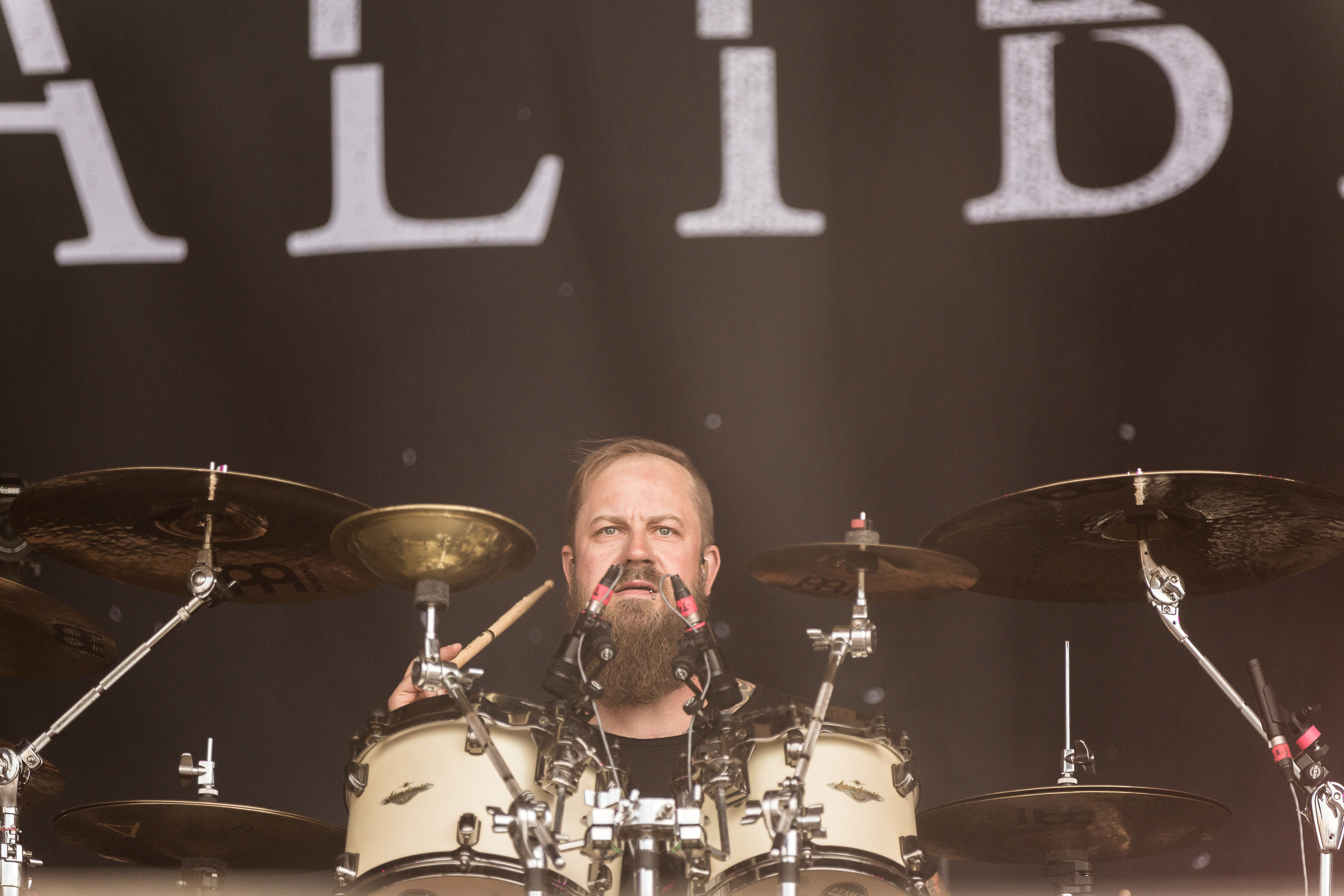
Patrick Grün

Current members

- Andreas Dörner – lead vocals (1997–present)
- Marc Görtz – lead guitar (1997–present)
- Denis Schmidt – rhythm guitar (2001–present), clean vocals (2004–2024; live-only 2024–present)
- Patrick Grün – drums (2003–present)
- Kenneth Iain Duncan – bass, clean vocals (2024–present)

Former members

- Marc Ulfig – vocals (1997)
- Björn Kaiser – rhythm guitar (1997)
- Kai Kogelheide – drums (1997)
- Engin Güres – bass (1997–2003)
- Claus Wilgenbusch – rhythm guitar (1998–1999)
- Robert Krämer – drums (1997–2003)
- Thomas Sielemann – rhythm guitar (1999–2000)
- Andreas Nikolaou – rhythm guitar (2000)
- Boris Pracht – bass (2004)
- Marco Schaller – bass, backing vocals (2004–2022)

Touring members

- Daniil Svetlov – drums (2015)

Timeline

== Discography ==
Caliban discography
- Studio albums: 13
- Extended plays: 2
- Music videos: 23
- Split albums: 2

=== Studio albums ===
List of studio albums, with selected chart positions
Year	Album details	Peak chart positions			
Year	Album details	GER	AUT	SWI	BEL (WA)
1999	A Small Boy and a Grey Heaven: Released: 14 December 1999; Label: Lifeforce	—	—	—	—
2001	Vent: Released: 27 January 2001; Label: Lifeforce	—	—	—	—
2003	Shadow Hearts: Released: 31 January 2003; Label: Lifeforce	—	—	—	—
2004	The Opposite from Within: Released: 5 October 2004; Label: Roadrunner	—	—	—	—
2006	The Undying Darkness: Released: 4 April 2006; Label: Abacus	73	—	—	—
2007	The Awakening: Released: 23 October 2007; Label: Century Media	36	74	—	—
2009	Say Hello to Tragedy: Released: 25 August 2009; Label: Century Media	36	64	87	—
2012	I Am Nemesis: Released: 3 February 2012; Label: Century Media	21	47	61	—
2014	Ghost Empire: Released: 24 January 2014; Label: Century Media	7	32	51	184
2016	Gravity: Released: 25 March 2016; Label: Century Media	15	26	27	123
2018	Elements: Released: 6 April 2018; Label: Century Media	6	26	38	—
2021	Zeitgeister: Released: 14 May 2021; Label: Century Media	15	—	—	—
2022	Dystopia: Released: 22 April 2022; Label: Century Media	6	—	—	—
2025	Back from Hell: Released: 25 April 2025; Label: Century Media	33	—	93	—
"—" denotes a recording that did not chart or was not released in that territory.

=== EPs ===
List of EPs
Title	Album details
Caliban	Released: 10 March 1998; Label: Lifeforce; Formats: CD
Coverfield	Released: 6 May 2011; Label: Century Media; Formats: CD, digital download

=== Split albums ===
List of Split albums
Title	Album details
The Split Program with Heaven Shall Burn	Released: 18 August 2000; Label: Lifeforce; Formats: CD, digital download
The Split Program II with Heaven Shall Burn	Released: 26 July 2005; Label: Lifeforce; Formats: CD, digital download

=== Music videos ===
List of music videos, showing year released and director
Title	Year	Director(s)
"Forsaken Horizon"	2003	—N/a
"The Beloved and the Hatred"	2004	—N/a
"It's Our Burden to Bleed"	2006	—N/a
"Nothing Is Forever"	2006	—N/a
"I Will Never Let You Down"	2007	—N/a
"24 Years"	2009	—N/a
"Caliban's Revenge"	2009	—N/a
"Walk Like the Dead"	2011	—N/a
"Memorial"	2011	—N/a
"We Are the Many"	2013	—N/a
"This Oath"	2013	Julian Topehlen
"Devil's Night"	2014	Lars Reinert
"Paralyzed"	2016	Moritz Maibaum
"brOKen"	2017	Mirko Witzki
"Intoxicated"	2018	Michael Winkler
"Before Later Becomes Never"	2018	Michael Winkler
"Ich Blute Für Dich"	2018	Sebastian Biesler & Mirko Witzki
"Intoleranz"	2021	Der Pakt
"nICHts"	2021	Der Pakt
"Nichts ist für immer"	2021	—N/a
"Ascent of the Blessed"	2022	Daniel Priess
"Dystopia"	2022	Mirko Witzki
"Alien"	2022	Mirko Witzki
"The Shadow"	2022	—N/a
"I Was a Happy Kid Once"	2024	Der Pakt
