= Thrice discography =

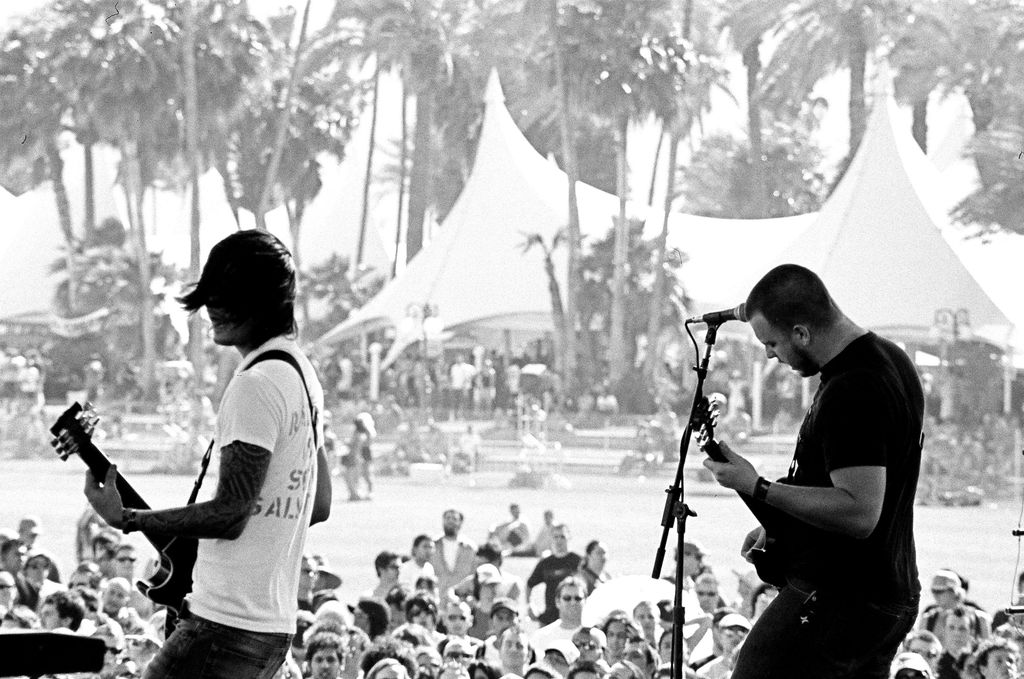
- Teppei Teranishi and Dustin Kensrue of Thrice performing at the 2005 Coachella Valley Music and Arts Festival
- Studio albums: 12
- Extended plays: 7
- Live albums: 2
- Compilation albums: 2
- Singles: 14
- Music videos: 18

The discography of Thrice consists of twelve studio albums, two live albums, two compilation albums, seven EPs, fourteen singles, and eighteen music videos.

Thrice formed in 1998 in Irvine, California. They released Identity Crisis in 2000 and The Illusion of Safety in 2002 through the independent label Sub City Records—an imprint of Hopeless Records. Shortly thereafter, Thrice signed to the major label Island Records and released their most commercially successful album The Artist in the Ambulance in 2003. The album spawned the two radio singles "All That's Left" and "Stare at the Sun" in addition to the promotional single "Under a Killing Moon". In 2005, Thrice released Vheissu again through Island.

In 2007, Thrice signed to Vagrant Records to release their multi-EP project The Alchemy Index. The first two EPs were released as The Alchemy Index Vols. I & II in 2007, and the final two EPs were released as The Alchemy Index Vols. III & IV in 2008. This project was followed by 2009's Beggars. Thrice released their eighth studio album Major/Minor in September 2011.

== Studio albums ==
Title	Album details	Peak chart positions									
Title	Album details	US	US Indie	AUS	AUT	BEL (FL)	CAN	GER	SCO	SWI	UK
Identity Crisis	Released: June 6, 2000; Label: Greenflag	—	—	—	—	—	—	—	—	—	—
The Illusion of Safety	Released: February 5, 2002; Label: Sub City	—	14	—	—	—	—	—	—	—	—
The Artist in the Ambulance	Released: July 22, 2003; Label: Island	16	—	—	—	—	42	—	—	—	109
Vheissu	Released: October 18, 2005; Label: Island	15	—	76	—	—	17	—	—	—	119
The Alchemy Index Vols. I & II	Released: October 16, 2007; Label: Vagrant	24	1	93	—	—	20	—	—	—	114
The Alchemy Index Vols. III & IV	Released: April 15, 2008; Label: Vagrant	17	1	—	—	—	13	—	—	—	140
Beggars	Released: September 15, 2009; Label: Vagrant	47	4	—	—	—	35	—	—	—	—
Major/Minor	Released: September 20, 2011; Label: Vagrant	18	2	82	—	—	19	—	—	—	107
To Be Everywhere Is to Be Nowhere	Released: May 27, 2016; Label: Vagrant	15	1	57	33	148	20	35	62	35	62
Palms	Released: September 14, 2018; Label: Epitaph	27	1	95	27	118	93	38	66	45	—
Horizons/East	Released: October 8, 2021; Label: Epitaph	—	—	—	57	—	—	15	—	47	—
Horizons/West	Released: October 3, 2025; Label: Epitaph	—	—	—	60	—	—	48	—	—	—
"—" denotes a release that did not chart.

== Live albums ==
Title	Album details	Peak chart positions
Title	Album details	US
Live at the House of Blues	Released: December 9, 2008; Label: Vagrant	—
Anthology	Released: October 2012; Label: Staple / Workhorse Music Group	104

== Compilation albums ==
Title	Album details	Certifications
If We Could Only See Us Now^{[A]}	Released: March 29, 2005; Label: Island	RIAA: Gold
The Alchemy Index^{[B]}	Released: March 30, 2009; Label: Vagrant	

== EPs ==
Year	EP details
First Impressions	Released: 1999; Label: Self-released
Live from the Apple Store	Released: November 11, 2003; Label: Island
Thrice	Released: 2004; Label: Island
Red Sky	Released: April 11, 2006; Label: Island
The Myspace Transmissions	Released: July 22, 2008; Label: Vagrant
Daytrotter Sessions	Released: January 4, 2010; Label: Vagrant
Sea Change	Released: April 22, 2017; Label: Vagrant
Deeper Wells	Released: April 13, 2019; Label: Epitaph

== Singles ==
Title	Year	Peak chart positions					Album
Title	Year	US Alt	US Main	US Rock	NZ Hot	UK	Album
"All That's Left"	2003	24	36	—	—	69	The Artist in the Ambulance
"Under a Killing Moon"^{[C]}	2003	—	—	—	—	83	The Artist in the Ambulance
"Stare at the Sun"	2003	39	—	—	—	—	The Artist in the Ambulance
"Image of the Invisible"	2005	—	24	—	—	—	Vheissu
"Come All You Weary"	2008	—	—	—	—	—	The Alchemy Index Vols. III & IV
"Black Honey"	2016	—	11	37	—	—	To Be Everywhere Is to Be Nowhere
"Hurricane"	2017	—	24	—	—	—	To Be Everywhere Is to Be Nowhere
"The Grey"	2018	—	14	—	—	—	Palms
"Only Us"	2018	—	—	—	—	—	Palms
"Hold Up a Light"	2019	—	16	—	—	—	Palms
"Scavengers"	2021	—	21	—	—	—	Horizons / East
"Summer Set Fire to the Rain"	2021	—	—	—	36	—	Horizons / East
"Open Your Eyes & Dream"	2022	—	—	—	—	—	Non-album single
"Gnash"	2025	—	—	—	—	—	Horizon / West
"Albatross"	2025	—	—	—	—	—	Horizon / West
"Holding On"	2025	—	—	—	—	—	Horizon / West
"The Dark Glow"	2025	—	—	—	—	—	Horizon / West
"—" denotes a release that did not chart.

== Other appearances ==
The following Thrice songs were released on compilation albums, soundtracks, and other releases. This is not an exhaustive list; songs that were first released on the band's albums, EPs, and singles are not included.

Title	Year	Label	Album
"Send Me an Angel" (originally by Real Life)	2002	Fearless	Punk Goes Pop
"Eleanor Rigby" (originally by The Beatles)	2002	Glue Factory Records	Because We Care
"That Hideous Strength"	2002	Hopeless	Hopelessly Devoted to You, Vol. 4
"Trust" (acoustic)	2003	Fearless	Punk Goes Acoustic
"Happy Xmas (War Is Over)" (originally by John Lennon/Yoko Ono)	2003	KROQ	The Year They Recalled Santa Claus
"Seeing Red/Screaming at a Wall" (originally by Minor Threat)	2005	Vagrant	Tony Hawk's American Wasteland
"Lullaby"	2005	Electronic Arts	Burnout Revenge
"Lullaby"	2006	Sub City	Hopelessly Devoted to You, Vol. 6
"Broken Lungs" (Legion of Doom remix)	2009	Lakeshore	Underworld: Rise of the Lycans
"Wood and Wire" (Sonic Session)	2011	Machine Shop/Warner Bros.	Download to Donate for Haiti V2.0
"I Want You (She’s So Heavy)" (originally by The Beatles)	2013	Favorite Gentlemen	Split with Manchester Orchestra

== Music videos ==
Title	Year	Director	Album
"Deadbolt"	2002	Mike Piscitelli	The Illusion of Safety
"Betrayal Is a Symptom"	2002		The Illusion of Safety
"All That's Left"	2003		The Artist in the Ambulance
"Stare at the Sun"	2004	Brett Simon	The Artist in the Ambulance
"Image of the Invisible"	2005	Jay Martin	Vheissu
"Red Sky"	2006	Tim Hope	Vheissu
"Digital Sea"	2007	Andrew Gura	The Alchemy Index Vols. I & II
"Come All You Weary"	2008	Zach Merck	The Alchemy Index Vols. III & IV
"In Exile"	2009	Josh Stern	Beggars
"Promises"	2011	Odin Wadleigh	Major/Minor
"Black Honey"	2016	Y2K	To Be Everywhere Is to Be Nowhere
"Hurricane"	2017	Y2K	To Be Everywhere Is to Be Nowhere
"The Grey"	2018	Daniel Carberry	Palms
"Only Us"	2018	Dan Huiting	Palms
"Hold Up A Light"	2019	Dan Monick	Palms
"Scavengers"	2021	Djay Brawner	Horizons/East
"Robot Soft Exorcism"	2021	Jason Link	Horizons/East
"Summer Set Fire to the Rain"	2021	Rob Fidel	Horizons/East
