= Songs That Saved My Life =

Compilation album by Hopeless Records
- Released: November 9, 2018
- Recorded: 2018
- Genres: Alternative rock; post-hardcore; pop punk; melodic hardcore
- Length: 49:18
- Labels: Hopeless; Sub City
- Producer: Mike Green

Singles from Songs That Saved My Life
- 1. "Torn" Released: September 10, 2018

Songs That Saved My Life is a compilation album by American record label Hopeless Records, in partnership with Sub City Records, released on November 9, 2018. The album contains various studio covers from post-hardcore, pop punk, and alternative rock bands in honor of suicide prevention.

The compilation album's lead single, a cover of "Torn" by Welsh rock band Neck Deep, was released on World Suicide Prevention Day, September 10, 2018.

== Background ==
Songs That Saved My Life was first unveiled by Hopeless Records and Sub City on Monday, September 10, 2018. In support of the announcement, the label released the compilation album's lead single, a cover of "Torn" by Welsh rock band Neck Deep, accompanied with its music video.

== Promotion ==
On September 10, 2018, Welsh rock band Neck Deep released their studio cover of Natalie Imbruglia's version of "Torn" by Ednaswap, along with its music video.

== Track listing ==
Songs That Saved My Life
No.	Title	Artist	Length
1.	"Torn" (originally by Ednaswap)	Neck Deep	4:04
2.	"Losing My Religion" (originally by R.E.M.)	Movements	4:29
3.	"Your Graduation" (originally by Modern Baseball)	Stand Atlantic	2:40
4.	"Semi-Charmed Life" (originally by Third Eye Blind)	Dance Gavin Dance	3:44
5.	"People Who Died" (originally by James Dennis Carroll)	Against Me!	4:56
6.	"Bullet with Butterfly Wings" (originally by The Smashing Pumpkins)	Taking Back Sunday	4:32
7.	"Crawling" (originally by Linkin Park)	Dream State	3:32
8.	"Such Great Heights" (originally by The Postal Service)	As It Is	3:23
9.	"Shape of My Heart" (originally by Sting)	Oceans Ate Alaska	5:37
10.	"Let It Be" (originally by The Beatles)	Too Close to Touch	3:52
11.	"Broom People" (originally by The Mountain Goats)	Dan Campbell & Ace Enders	2:29
12.	"Transatlanticism" (originally by Death Cab for Cutie)	The Maine	8:00

== Songs That Saved My Life Volume 2 ==
Following the success of the first Songs That Saved My Life, Hopeless Records and Sub City, who released the album, announced a second volume was in the works and confirmed its release later that year. The album was released on November 8, 2019, approximately one year after the first volume. Like its predecessor, the album features bands covering songs that helped them through a difficult time in their lives, in the hopes that these versions would help those who also struggle find a voice and speak out. A portion of the proceeds went to many charities that focus around suicide prevention and mental health. In support of the album, a single was released with State Champs covering "Real World", by Matchbox Twenty.

Songs That Saved My Life Volume 2
No.	Title	Artist	Length
1.	"Real World" (originally by Matchbox Twenty)	State Champs	3:49
2.	"Disarm" (originally by The Smashing Pumpkins)	Silverstein	3:19
3.	"Drops of Jupiter" (originally by Train)	With Confidence	4:04
4.	"Wicked Game" (originally by Chris Isaak)	This Wild Life	4:48
5.	"Shake It Out" (originally by Florence and the Machine)	Doll Skin	4:06
6.	"Tiny Cities Made of Ashes" (originally by Modest Mouse)	The Frights	3:42
7.	"New Year's Project" (originally by Further Seems Forever)	Mayday Parade	3:55
8.	"Trust" (originally by Thrice)	The Red Jumpsuit Apparatus	2:47
9.	"Die For the Government" (originally by Anti-Flag)	Sharptooth	3:27
10.	"Given Up" (originally by Linkin Park)	Trash Boat	3:23

== Additional songs ==
Additional standalone singles were released as part of the STSML brand in the years following the release of Volume 2:

- Weathers - "Lucky" (originally by Britney Spears)
- AJJ - "Candy Jail" (originally by Silver Jews)
- Said the Sky, Olivver the Kid, Levi the Poet - "Worth Living For" (a new song billed as a "Songs That Saved My Life Original")
- NOAHFINNCE (feat. Sydney Dolezal and Meghan Herring of Doll Skin) - "Parents" (originally by Yungblud)
- Aaron West and the Roaring Twenties - "Thunder Road" (originally by Bruce Springsteen)
- We the Kings - "Fix You" (originally by Coldplay)
- Mind's Eye - "Don't Change" (originally by INXS)
- Senses - "Perfect" (originally by Simple Plan)
- Arankai - "Meant to Live" (originally by Switchfoot)
- Melrose Avenue - "Drown" (originally by Bring Me the Horizon)
