= Live at the House of Blues (Thrice album) =

Live album by Thrice
- Released: December 9, 2008
- Recorded: May 28, 2008
- Venue: House of Blues; Anaheim, California
- Genre: Post-hardcore; melodic hardcore; alternative rock; experimental rock; art rock
- Label: Vagrant

Thrice chronology
The Alchemy Index Vols. III & IV (2008)	Live at the House of Blues (2008)	Beggars (2009)

Professional ratings
Review scores
Source	Rating
AbsolutePunk.net	83%
Allmusic	3/5 stars
Melodic	3/5 stars
Sputnikmusic	4/5 stars

Live at the House of Blues is a live album from the band Thrice released by Vagrant Records on December 9, 2008. The album spans two CDs and includes a DVD featuring live footage and an exclusive interview in which the band answers fan-submitted questions. The track listing consists of songs from 2002's The Illusion of Safety through 2008's The Alchemy Index Vols. III & IV. The live footage was filmed at the House of Blues in Anaheim, California.

== Track listing ==
The DVD listing is the same as the CDs.

Disc 1
No.	Title	Original album	Length
1.	"The Lion and the Wolf"	The Alchemy Index Vols. III & IV	1:14
2.	"Firebreather"	The Alchemy Index Vols. I & II	4:03
3.	"The Messenger"	The Alchemy Index Vols. I & II	2:24
4.	"Of Dust and Nations"	Vheissu	4:51
5.	"Digital Sea"	The Alchemy Index Vols. I & II	4:02
6.	"Flags of Dawn"	Red Sky (EP)	4:02
7.	"Burn the Fleet"	The Alchemy Index Vols. I & II	4:41
8.	"Open Water"	The Alchemy Index Vols. I & II	4:29
9.	"The Earth Isn't Humming"	The Alchemy Index Vols. III & IV	5:49
10.	"The Artist in the Ambulance"	The Artist in the Ambulance	3:31
11.	"Trust"	The Illusion of Safety	3:40
12.	"Cold Cash and Colder Hearts"	The Artist in the Ambulance	2:49

Disc 2
No.	Title	Original album	Length
1.	"Broken Lungs"	The Alchemy Index Vols. III & IV	4:39
2.	"The Whaler"	The Alchemy Index Vols. I & II	4:02
3.	"All That's Left"	The Artist in the Ambulance	3:17
4.	"Silhouette"	The Artist in the Ambulance	4:07
5.	"Come All You Weary"	The Alchemy Index Vols. III & IV	5:20
6.	"Stare at the Sun"	The Artist in the Ambulance	4:12
7.	"Daedalus"	The Alchemy Index Vols. III & IV	6:02
8.	"Don't Tell and We Won't Ask"	The Artist in the Ambulance	4:18
9.	"Hold Fast Hope"	Vheissu	4:09
10.	"For Miles"	Vheissu	6:38
11.	"Red Sky"	Vheissu	5:13
12.	"Deadbolt"	The Illusion of Safety	3:44
13.	"The Earth Will Shake"	Vheissu	5:29

== Personnel ==
- Dustin Kensrue – lead vocals, electric and acoustic guitar, synthesizer ("Digital Sea"), maracas ("The Earth Isn't Humming")
- Teppei Teranishi – electric guitar, keyboards, backing vocals, glockenspiel ("Broken Lungs")
- Ed Breckenridge – bass, keyboards, backing vocals, electric guitar ("Open Water" and "The Earth Isn't Humming")
- Riley Breckenridge – drums, sampling
