= Beggars (album) =

Studio album by Thrice
- Released: August 9, 2009
- Recorded: March–June 2009
- Studio: New Grass
- Genre: Alternative rock; post-hardcore; experimental rock; art rock
- Length: 43:44
- Label: Vagrant
- Producer: Thrice, Teppei Teranishi

Thrice chronology
Live at the House of Blues (2008)	Beggars (2009)	Major/Minor (2011)

Singles from Beggars
- 1. "The Weight" Released: October 13, 2009

Beggars is the seventh studio album by American rock band Thrice. It was released digitally through Vagrant Records in the UK on August 9, 2009, and in the US on August 11, 2009. A physical release containing bonus material was released on September 15, 2009.

== Background and production ==
Between September 2006 and June 2007, Thrice recorded a project revolving around the elements fire, water, air and earth. Dubbed The Alchemy Index, it was released as two double-discs sets: Vols. I & II: Fire & Water in October 2007, and Vols. III & IV: Air & Earth in April 2008. Writing for Beggars began in January 2009, with the band aiming to make the record "a little more upbeat and energetic" following their two previous projects, Vheissu and The Alchemy Index, which they felt had a "sleepy feeling" to them. Though Kensrue took a break from the writing process to go on a brief US tour later in the month. The Alchemy Index saw the group write to theme-specific elements, and record in a split manner: two of the members would be work on an acoustic song, while drummer Riley Breckenridge was focused on programming for the Water element, or bassist Eddie Breckenridge would be writing bass parts for the Fire element.

It resulted in the band spending less time together to work on ideas. With Beggars, it became a collaboration between the members where they jammed on material and crafted songs as a unit. Recording took place at New Grass Studios, which was built by the band themselves in guitarist Teppei Teranishi's garage. It was done with the aims of saving money and allowing the band members to spend more time with their families. The band as a whole and Teranishi separately received joint producer credit; Teranishi also served as the engineer. They typically recorded around four takes of any given track, which they'd stitch together to make a version they felt was interesting. Sessions began in March, and after 13 tracks had been recorded, they concluded in June; Dave Schiffman mixed the recordings, before they were mastered by Howie Weinberg at Masterdisk.

== Composition ==
=== Overview ===
It incorporated elements of their Vheissu (2005) and The Alchemy Index releases, namely from the Water and Air discs. Beggars saw Teranishi and Kensrue take influence from blues music, while Eddie and Riley Breckenridge centered their attention on grooves. It drew comparison to Radiohead and Muse. The band wanted a dry drum tone for "Circles", which they were unable to get in their garage studio. They decided to put blankets on Riley Breckenridge's kit, which they ended up using for several of the songs.

All of the music was written by the band, while Kensrue wrote almost all of the lyrics, bar "We Move Like Swing Sets" (which was written by Eddie Breckenridge). Kensrue said writing lyrics were a slow process for him due to being a perfectionistic and thinking of every aspect of a song, such as its mood and metre. He spent two consecutive weeks working on lyrics, before going to see the Star Trek (2009) film, which spurred him to write the words to "The Weight" and "Wood and Wire".

He covered the lyrical themes of commitment to marriage, relationships breaking down and salvation. The release is a concept album about "love, loss, and the inequality of man". On the subject of the record's title, Kensrue also commented: "I think we are at most times deluded in thinking that we are totally responsible for our circumstances, but in the end almost everything is beyond our control to a high degree and we can't even be sure we will wake up tomorrow. […] everything in life is a gift at its core; we are beggars all."

=== Tracks ===
The lyrics of opening track "All the World Is Mad" depict an apocalyptic-type world with an entity who wants the goodness of humanity. Its music recalled Godspeed You! Black Emperor and Muse, incorporating the use of polyrhythms. "The Weight" shifts from a minimalistic arrangement to loud guitars with syncopated rhythms in the vein of Verra Cruz; it discusses the theme of marriage. "Circles" evolved out of a demo, which consisted of electronic instrumentation, that Riley Breckenridge had written. They tried to emulate the electronic drums with added percussion during the chorus sections. The final version is a piano-driven track, led by Teranishi's electric piano; Kensrue's voice recalled Radiohead frontman Thom Yorke with his whispering-styled vocals. It builds with looped guitar parts and drums, leading to a breakdown near the track's end. "Doublespeak" features walls of feedback against piano chord progressions. It talks about people that purposely live in ignorance to remain in a place of privilege despite the expense of others.

Southern rock track "In Exile" talks about being exiled in perpetuity and going on an immeasurable pilgrimage. "At the Last" sees Kensrue rallying against consumerism; the guitar work recalled the sound of grunge. The psychedelic track "Wood and Wire" utilises distortion and dubbing effects, while its feedback-enhanced verses were reminiscent of the intro to "Of Dust and Nations", a track from the group's Vheissu album. It is sung from the viewpoint of a man, who has been in prison for 14 years for an offense he didn't commit, as he walks to his execution. The chorus section features lyrics adapted from the works of St. Paul. "Talking Through Glass" ends with an acoustic coda. Kensrue said "The Great Exchange" is a metaphor for the gospel, which he tried to present as an emotional story. It discusses the failed rebellion of a ship's crew, and one individual who drifted to sea. The backing vocals on it recalled those heard in "Nude" by Radiohead. The title-track begins with a jazz-esque drum beat and builds to a crescendo with screaming. It sees Kensrue ask questions in the vein of the Book of Job about businessmen, scientists and politicians, among others.

== Release ==
In June 2009, Beggars was announced for release in October. Following this, the band performed on the Warped Tour between late June and late August. The first single, "All the World Is Mad," was released as a downloadable song in Guitar Hero: World Tour on July 23. Due to security flaws with a web player that Vagrant Records had been using for the past three years, a version of the album was leaked to the internet in July. The label subsequently issued a statement claiming that someone hacked into their system, and proceeded to crack the log in details. Kensrue later clarified that it was someone who had access to Vagrant's FTP server; Riley Breckenridge added that it was an unmastered promotional copy with voiceovers on each track that had leaked. The band themselves responded to the leak, stating they were "disappointed" but "moving forward".

Kensrue said they had two choices: continue with the planned October release date, or release it as legally as was possible and offer bonus tracks on the CD edition. The original release date of October 13 was changed to an initially digital-only release on August 9 (UK) and August 11 (US), with a physical release following on September 15. The physical release contains a card with a code to download five bonus tracks, including two outtakes, "Answered," and "Red Telephone" from the Beggars sessions, a cover of the Beatles' "Helter Skelter," as well as remixes of "All the World Is Mad" and "Circles." Due to the change of release date, the original cover art (which featured people eating) was changed, with the band being unable to "wait on the clearances" for the photo that was to be used for it, and having to switch to a different image that they had "proper clearance on." The original iTunes artwork was the Thrice logo; the final artwork consisted of people fishing, which was taken by Stanley Tretick.

For the band's previous albums, a portion of each copy sold went a specific charity, chosen by the band. However, for Beggars the group found difficulty in working out all the legal paperwork with various labels and publishing companies. As a result, they gave the Invisible Children, Inc. organization a booth on dates of their tours where fans could get involved. The band went on a three-week US tour supporting Brand New in October and November 2009. on their way back to their home state of California, the band went on a headlining tour with support from the Dear Hunter and Polar Bear Club, running through to December 2009. A music video was released for "In Exile", which premiered through the group's Myspace profile on November 26. It was shot in black-and-white, and consisted of touring footage both on-and-off stage interspersed with clips of industrial America. On January 4, 2010, a Daytrotter session was posted online with the band performing versions of "All the World Is Mad", "Circles" and "Beggars". Following this, the band went on a tour of the UK. In April 2010, the band went on a co-headlining US tour with Manchester Orchestra, and were supported by O'Brother. The trek was intended to last into May 2010; on April 26, 2010, the rest of the shows were cancelled due to a family emergency that saw Kensrue fly home. Following this, they went on a North American tour with support from Kevin Devine, Bad Veins and the Dig. An additional leg of shows was added, extending the trek into July 2010.

== Reception ==
Professional ratings
Review scores
Source	Rating
AllMusic	4/5 stars
Alternative Press	4.5/5 stars
BBC	Favorable
Chart Attack	Favorable
Cross Rhythms	9/10 stars
Melodic	3.5/5 stars
Ox-Fanzine	9/10 stars
Rock Hard	9/10
Sputnikmusic	3.5/5 stars
Ultimate Guitar	7/10

=== Critical response ===
Critical reaction to Beggars has been extremely positive. Writing for Alternative Press, Scott Heisel called the album a "textbook example of the term 'creative milestone,'" and concluded that the band "have achieved that rare feat of actually progressing and maturing," rating the album as 4.5 out of 5. Nick Greer's review for Sputnikmusic claimed that "softer songs" on the album, "namely 'Circles,' 'Wood & Wire,' and 'The Great Exchange,' are haunting and sad in a way Thrice has never captured before," and stated that "instrumentally, the band has never been better." Despite this he went on to call the album "at once familiar and alienating," and claimed that the band had fallen "into a complacent territory that doesn't truly push their music to new heights." He gave the album 3.5 out of 5, concluding by calling Beggars the sound of a band "settling into a sweet spot that neither attempts to leap past the achievements of previous albums nor away from what has made them so great for so long."

=== Commercial performance and accolades ===
In the first week of Beggars' physical release, it sold 11,686 copies. It charted at number 47 on the Billboard 200; it charted on three other component charts: number 4 on Independent Albums, number 7 on Alternative Albums, and number 14 on Top Rock Albums.

Blare included the album at second place on their top 50 albums of 2009 list.

== Track listing ==
All music by Thrice and all lyrics by Dustin Kensrue, except "We Move Like Swing Sets" by Eddie Breckenridge.

No.	Title	Length
1.	"All the World is Mad"	3:59
2.	"The Weight"	5:00
3.	"Circles"	4:19
4.	"Doublespeak"	4:51
5.	"In Exile"	3:53
6.	"At the Last"	4:05
7.	"Wood and Wire"	4:10
8.	"Talking Through Glass/We Move Like Swing-Sets"	4:30
9.	"The Great Exchange"	3:33
10.	"Beggars"	5:24
Total length:		43:44

CD edition bonus-tracks
No.	Title	Length
11.	"All the World is Mad" (Free the Robots remix)	3:58
12.	"Answered"	3:44
13.	"Circles" (Textual remix)	4:10
14.	"Helter Skelter" (The Beatles cover)	3:18
15.	"Red Telephone"	2:35

== Personnel ==
Personnel per booklet.

Thrice

- Dustin Kensrue – lead-vocals, rhythm-guitar
- Teppei Teranishi – lead-guitar, keyboards
- Eddie Breckenridge – bass
- Riley Breckenridge – drums

Production

- Thrice – producer
- Teppei Teranishi – producer, engineer
- Dave Schiffman – mixing
- Howie Weinberg – mastering
- Nathan Warketin – art design, interior booklet photos
- Stanley Tretick – cover photo
- Matt Wignall – interior booklet photos

== Charts ==
Chart performance
Chart (2009)	Peak position
Canadian Albums (Nielsen SoundScan)	35
UK Independent Albums (OCC)	34
UK Rock & Metal Albums (OCC)	26
US Billboard 200	47
US Independent Albums (Billboard)	4
US Indie Store Album Sales (Billboard)	10
US Top Alternative Albums (Billboard)	7
US Top Rock Albums (Billboard)	14
