= The Alchemy Index =

The Alchemy Index is a four-volume concept album by American rock band Thrice:

- The Alchemy Index Vols. I & II (2007)
- The Alchemy Index Vols. III & IV (2008)
