= Thrice =

American rock band

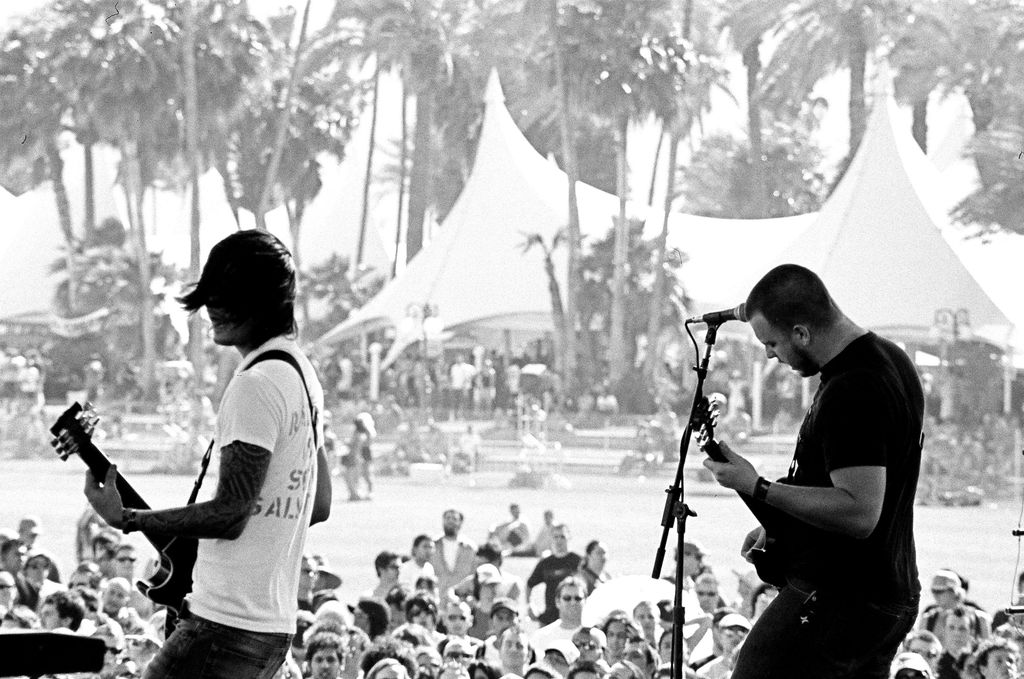
- Teppei Teranishi (left) and Dustin Kensrue (right)

Background information
- Origin: Irvine, California, U.S.
- Genres: Post-hardcore; pop-punk; experimental rock; emo; alternative rock; art rock; melodic hardcore
- Works: Thrice discography
- Years active: 1998–2012; 2015–present
- Labels: Sub City; Hopeless; Island; Vagrant; Epitaph
- Members: Eddie Breckenridge; Riley Breckenridge; Dustin Kensrue; Teppei Teranishi
- Website: thrice.net

Thrice is an American rock band from Irvine, California, formed in 1998. The group was founded by guitarist/vocalist Dustin Kensrue and lead guitarist Teppei Teranishi while they were in high school.

Early in their career, the band was known for melodic hardcore punk music based in heavily distorted guitars, prominent lead guitar lines, and frequent changes in complex time signatures. This style is exemplified on their second album, The Illusion of Safety (2002) and their third album The Artist in the Ambulance (2003). Their fourth album Vheissu (2005) made significant changes by incorporating electronic beats, keyboards, and a more experimental sound. In 2007 and 2008, Thrice released The Alchemy Index, consisting of two studio albums that together make a four-part, 24-song cycle. Each of the four six-song EPs of the Alchemy Index features significantly different styles, based on different aspects of the band's musical esthetic which reflect the elemental themes of fire, water, air and earth, both lyrically and musically. The band's seventh album, Beggars, was released on August 11, 2009, and their eighth, Major/Minor on September 20, 2011. The most recent albums feature a refined combination of the band's different experiments and explorations. In 2011, Thrice announced a final tour and an imminent hiatus.

Kensrue and Teranishi decided to reform the band in 2015 after attending a Brand New concert. In 2016, Thrice released their first post-reunion album, To Be Everywhere Is to Be Nowhere. The band's tenth album, Palms, was released in 2018. Their eleventh studio album Horizons/East was released in September 2021. Each album released by Thrice has had a portion of its sales proceeds donated to a new charitable organization.

== History ==
=== First Impressions and Identity Crisis (1998–2001) ===
Dustin Kensrue and Teppei Teranishi knew each other from school and had played in a band called Chapter 11. Teppei recruited his skate park friend Eddie Breckenridge to play bass, who then brought his brother Riley on as a drummer. In 1998, before their first show, they realized they needed a name. Hard-pressed for time, they decided to go with the name 'Thrice' out of desperation. Thrice was initially an inside joke between the band members, and they were going to use it only temporarily for their first show. However, they began to gain fans with the name, and people started to associate them with it, so they were forced to keep it.

In 1999, the band self-released an EP, First Impressions, which was the product of a two-day session at A-Room Studios with Brian Tochilin. Only 1,000 copies were made and the band members sold them out of their cars. Working with Death by Stereo's Paul Miner, the quartet recorded twelve tracks, and by April 2000, the group had released Identity Crisis on Greenflag Records. A portion of the album's proceeds were donated to a local charity called Crittenton Services for Children and Families. More support gigs and local buzz followed, and Thrice sparked the interest of Hopeless/Sub City's Louis Posen. In 2001, Posen signed with the band, reissued Identity Crisis, and sent the group out on tour with Samiam. Tours with Midtown and Hot Rod Circuit followed.

=== The Illusion of Safety (2002) ===
"Deadbolt"
from The Illusion of Safety - "Deadbolt" shows Thrice's early main style of fast-riff music.

Thrice re-entered the studio with producer Brian McTernan to record its Hopeless/Sub City debut, The Illusion of Safety. The album was released in February 2002. The band toured extensively to support it, opening for Further Seems Forever and Face to Face before embarking on its first headlining tour later that year. The band again donated a portion of the album's proceeds, this time choosing a non-profit youth shelter in South Central Los Angeles, A Place Called Home. The band's donations were matched by their label.

The album received generally positive reviews and garnered the attention of several major labels. The band eventually signed with Island Records, who had agreed to match Thrice's charitable donations in the same manner that Hopeless/Sub City had. That fall, the band toured with Hot Water Music and Coheed and Cambria before returning to the studio.

=== The Artist in the Ambulance (2003–2004) ===
The band re-entered the studio in March and April 2003. On July 22, 2003, the band released its Island Records debut, The Artist in the Ambulance. The album was again produced by Brian McTernan. The album's title is in reference to Burn Collector by Al Burian and is meant to reflect the band's desire to do more than make music and contribute to society through their charitable donations. A portion of the album's proceeds were this time donated to the Syrentha Savio Endowment, a financial aid organization for breast cancer patients. First pressings of the album were packaged in a digipak-style case with postcards containing lyrics and notes from the band.

The album spawned three singles: "All That's Left", "Under a Killing Moon", and "Stare at the Sun." "All That's Left" received significant airplay, and Thrice found themselves playing at larger venues as the year progressed. In addition to returning to the Warped Tour for its 2003 iteration around the time of album's release, a co-headlining fall tour with labelmates Thursday and opener Coheed and Cambria sold out across the United States, as well as a stint on the Honda Civic Tour with Dashboard Confessional, The Get Up Kids, and Hot Water Music.

Throughout 2004, the band continued to tour in support of The Artist in the Ambulance. Island Records issued a promotional disc (that features an alternate version of "The Artist in the Ambulance") in early 2004 that would become the basis for If We Could Only See Us Now, a CD/DVD package outlining the group's career. Named after a lyric from "So Strange I Remember You," the CD portion contained live tracks from a performance at the Apple Store and various B-sides. A slot to promote the CD/DVD came on the 2004 Warped Tour, their third time playing the tour.

=== Vheissu (2005–2006) ===
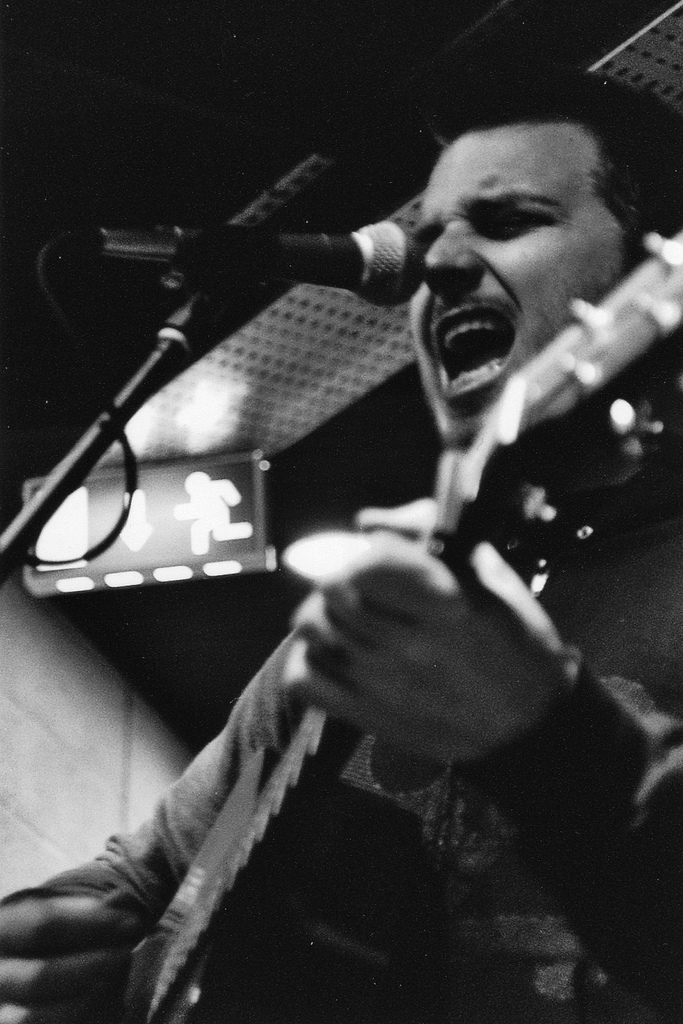
Dustin Kensrue performing at a Fopp instore signing in Southampton, UK.

Thrice spent much of the first half of 2005 working with producer Steve Osborne on the follow-up to The Artist in the Ambulance. Thrice released Vheissu on October 18, 2005, with "Image of the Invisible" as the first single. The album's title was taken from the Thomas Pynchon novel V., and featured a wider variety of instrumentation than used in the band's previous albums, including the use of strings, electronics, and a Rhodes Piano. Many of the album's lyrics also feature biblical, spiritual, and abstract themes.

For the band's donations related to this album's sales proceeds, Thrice chose novelist Dave Eggers's charity 826 Valencia, a tutorial program for underprivileged children, which promotes literacy and aids teens in developing creative writing skills. In return, Eggers created the cover art for Vheissu.

The band toured extensively in support of the album, including headlining the 2006 Taste of Chaos tour and performing "Image of the Invisible" on Jimmy Kimmel Live!. In April 2006, the band released "Red Sky" as the second single from the album. The accompanying video was directed by Tim Hope, who had previously directed videos for Coldplay and Jimmy Eat World. Instead of releasing just a single, Thrice opted to release the Red Sky EP in support of the single, which included two previously unreleased tracks and four live tracks.

=== The Alchemy Index (2006–2008) ===
"Digital Sea"
from The Alchemy Index - "Digital Sea" shows Thrice's incorporation of new instruments, such as synthesizers, and the vast difference in their sound compared to their earlier albums.

In September 2006, the band announced plans for a new album (later titled The Alchemy Index) on their official website. The album was conceived as a series of 4 EPs, each of which represents an element of nature: fire, water, air, and earth. The band maintained a studio blog "Alchemy Index" throughout the recording process.

During the recording process, the band announced that they were leaving Island Records, citing a difference of opinion on the band's future direction as the reason for the split. The band joined Vagrant Records on August 9, 2007.

On October 12, 2007, Thrice released the first two songs from the Alchemy Index in their entirety through the band's MySpace page. The Alchemy Index Vols. I & II was released on October 16, 2007, and sold 28,000 copies in its first week. It debuted at number 24 on the Billboard 200 chart, and it topped at number five on the iTunes top-selling albums. To promote the new album, Thrice toured with the bands MewithoutYou and Brand New, and followed with a series of Canadian shows with bands Say Anything and Attack in Black. The second half of the project, The Alchemy Index Vols. III & IV - Earth & Air, was released on April 15, 2008.

The final song on each disc is written in the form of a sonnet, depicting the relationship of man with each of the particular elements. Each of these songs is in iambic pentameter, with a concluding rhyming couplet. These final couplets also contain the same vocal melody and chord progression as each other, although they are in different keys.

Thrice toured with Circa Survive and Pelican in spring 2008 to support The Alchemy Index, which had now been released in full. The third-to-last show of this tour—the May 28, 2008, show at the House of Blues in Anaheim—was filmed for a live CD/DVD Live at the House of Blues. The live album spans 2 CDs and a DVD with live footage and an exclusive interview in which the band answers fan-submitted questions. In fall 2008, they embarked on a tour supporting Rise Against, along with Alkaline Trio and The Gaslight Anthem.

=== Beggars (2009–2010) ===
On January 4, 2009, the band announced on its website that writing had begun for the follow-up to The Alchemy Index, with the title announced as Beggars on June 15, 2009. A July update to the band's website revealed the release date to be October 13, 2009. However, after the album was leaked several months in advance, the band announced on their website on July 23, 2009, that the album would be released exclusively to iTunes on August 11. The physical CD was released on September 15, 2009. Bonus content included two b-sides from the Beggars sessions, two remixes, and a studio rendition of their cover of The Beatles' "Helter Skelter".

Feeling that the band's previous two projects (The Alchemy Index and Vheissu) had a "sleepy feeling" to them, Thrice wanted to make a record that was "a little more upbeat and energetic." Thrice's members also hoped to save money and spend more time with their families by building a recording studio in guitarist Teppei Teranishi's home. Originally, the band expressed interest in tracking the record live (i.e. recording the full band all at once, instead of each instrument individually and mixing together at a later time) in the home studio; however Thrice later abandoned the idea of recording this way. Instead, the band recorded songs with "similar vibe[s] musically, and tonally" in the same session. Several wooden devices were constructed by the band for the home studio to make the recordings "sound better." The self-produced album was released through Vagrant Records.

Thrice played The Bamboozle Left festival in April, and played selected dates on the summer's Warped Tour. Throughout the Warped Tour shows, Thrice played "All the World is Mad," "At the Last" and "The Weight."

The song "All the World is Mad" is featured in the Vagrant Song Pack for Guitar Hero, which was released on July 23, 2009. "Deadbolt" appears on Guitar Hero 5.

In 2009, it was announced that the band would serve as openers for Brand New for their Fall North American tour. Multiple shows were sold out, and the band notably performed a cover of The Beatles's "Helter Skelter". After this leg of the tour, Thrice began a tour with The Dear Hunter, but they had to play without guitarist Teppei Teranishi who left due to a family emergency.

In 2009, while on the Vans Warped Tour in Houston, Texas, the band autographed a Gibson Guitar for the non-profit Music Saves Lives and assisted in their goal of raising the nation's blood supply.

Thrice posted a poll for fans to vote for which song from Beggars to use for a music video. "All the World is Mad", "The Weight", "Circles" and "In Exile" were the choices for the poll, with "In Exile" narrowly beating "The Weight" even after some voters hacked into the system to try to choose the winner. The live-themed, black and white music video premiered on MySpace Music on Thanksgiving Day, November 26, 2009, their first live video since 2002's "Deadbolt."

Thrice's spring (2010) tour with Manchester Orchestra was cut short on April 23 when Kensrue had to leave because of an illness in the family.

=== Major/Minor and hiatus (2011–2015) ===
In an interview with Blare Magazine on June 16, 2010, Kensrue revealed that each member had been writing music for a new Thrice album individually, and that "pretty soon" the band would enter the studio to write and record the album collectively.

On April 20, 2011, Thrice announced on their website that their next album was ready to go and studio-bound. The album was recorded in May 2011 at Red Bull Studios, with most of the parts being recorded there and the band adding overdubs and "tweaking" a few things in Teppei's home recording studio (New Grass Studios) in the days after recording at Red Bull Studios.

The new album, Major/Minor, was released on September 20, 2011, through Vagrant Records.

Following Thrice's spring 2012 tour, the band went on hiatus. In the group's public statement, Kensrue stated that "Thrice is not breaking up," but that the band would be "taking a break from being a full-time band."

Thrice, accompanied by Animals as Leaders and O'Brother, began their farewell tour on May 4, 2012, in San Diego and ended it with a 33-song solo show on June 19, 2012, in Santa Ana. The tour's setlist song pool was determined by a fan vote on their entire song catalog (excluding First Impressions). Thrice's second live album, Anthology, was released on October 30, 2012, on two CDs and as a quadruple 180 gram LP box set limited to 3000 copies, and features 24 songs recorded at select shows along the tour.

Thrice's last interview aired on June 18, 2012, just one day after the band wrapped up their farewell tour. JC from theFIVE10 Radio spoke with Eddie and Teppei.

==== Hiatus activities ====
Riley Breckenridge plays drums in a grindcore side project called Puig Destroyer with Ian Miller (KWC), Jon Howell (KWC, Tigon), and Mike Minnick (Curl Up and Die). Their self-titled demo is composed of six songs clocking in at about six minutes, which is a reference to the jersey number of Yasiel Puig (66), formerly of the Los Angeles Dodgers, whom the six song demo is inspired by. The name is a reference to both Puig and grindcore band Pig Destroyer. The demo was released on a 7" 45 rpm vinyl by The Ghost Is Clear Records.

Eddie Breckenridge joined the alternative rock band Angels & Airwaves in June 2014, which also features current/former members of Blink-182, Nine Inch Nails and Hazen Street. He is also in the supergroup Less Art with his brother Riley.

=== Reunion and To Be Everywhere Is to Be Nowhere (2015–2017) ===
On December 22, 2014, the band posted an image on its website showing the view from behind the mixing desk, facing the band performing, overlaid with the text "Thrice 2015." Kensrue and Teranishi were attending a Brand New concert when they decided to reunite the band. Two months later, Thrice began announcing their inclusion in several 2015 music festivals, including New Jersey's Skate and Surf Fest in May; Montebello, Quebec's Amnesia Rockfest in June; Folkestone, UK's Hevy Music Festival in August; and three sites for Riot Fest, Denver in August as well as Chicago and Toronto in September. On October 3, Thrice performed at Taste of Chaos in San Bernardino, CA.

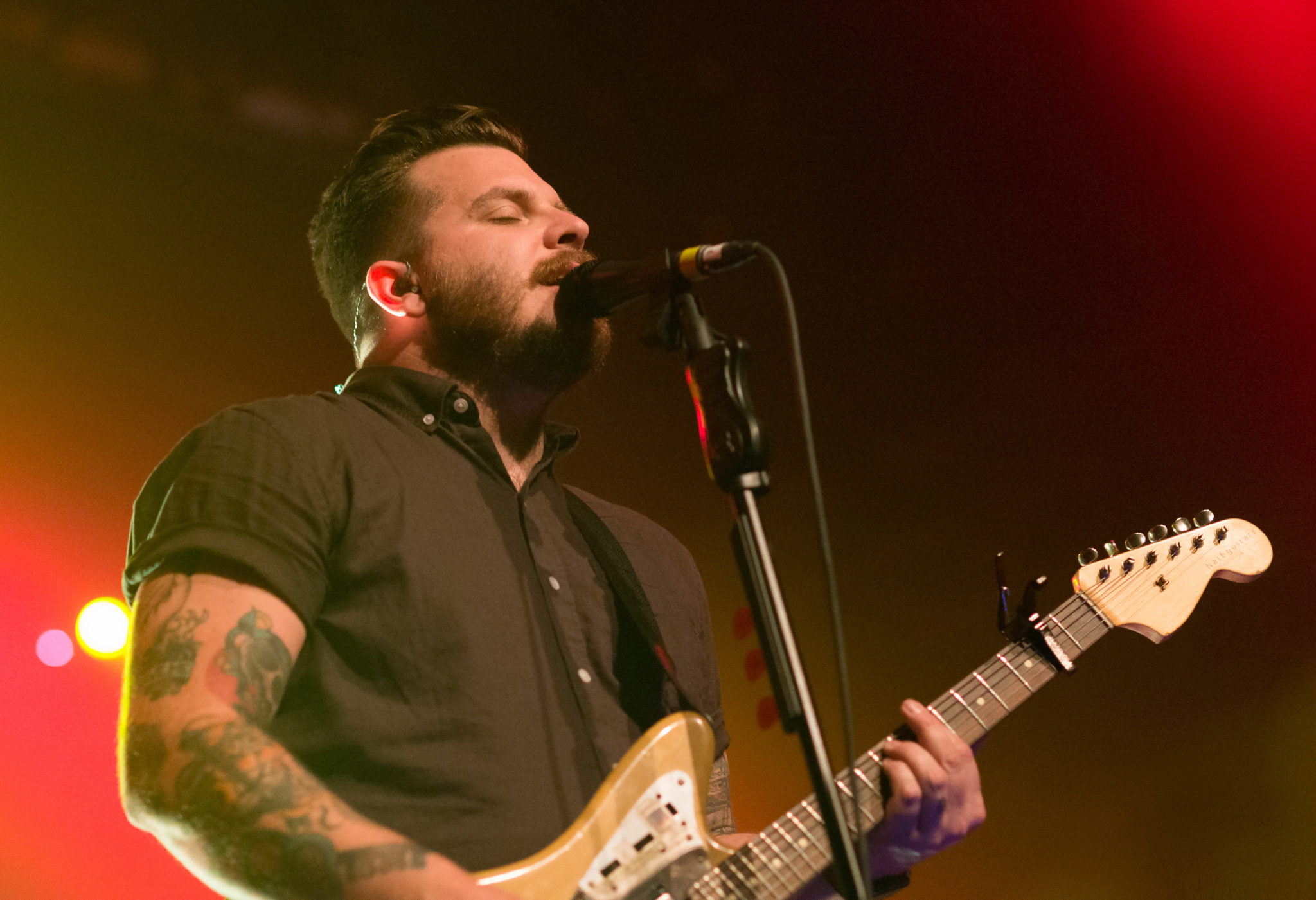
Dustin Kensrue of Thrice at PlayStation Theater, NYC 2016

On November 23, 2015, Thrice announced that they would be releasing a new album in 2016. On March 22, 2016, its title was announced as To Be Everywhere Is to Be Nowhere, with a release date of May 27, 2016. A pre-release track, "Blood on the Sand", was released a few days later. In April 2016, Thrice released the lead single from To Be Everywhere Is to Be Nowhere, "Black Honey", and announced several summer tour dates throughout the US and Europe. On May 17, ten days before the release of the album, Thrice released the official music video for their song "Black Honey." It features all of the members of the band, and was directed and edited by Y2K and produced by Jason Lester. On May 23, five days before the album was released, Thrice premiered "Death from Above" on BBC Radio 1. Another single, "Hurricane", was released April 6. The song was the highest viewed new video in its debut week in April on Loudwire's Top 10 Video Countdown.

Through a Facebook post on March 27, 2017, Thrice announced a new EP; Sea Change. It consists of a new track from the To Be Everywhere Is to Be Nowhere sessions, as well as a live acoustic version of Black Honey. It was released on 7-inch vinyl for Record Store Day on April 22, 2017.

=== Epitaph Records and Palms (2018–2019) ===
In June 2018, the band confirmed that they had signed to Epitaph Records. On June 5, 2018, they released their first song under Epitaph Records called "The Grey." The band also announced a headlining tour with The Bronx and Teenage Wrist. It was later announced "The Grey" was the lead single from their tenth studio album, Palms. It was slated for release on September 14, 2018. On July 10, 2018, the band released a music video for "The Grey." On August 14, 2018, the band released "Only Us", their second single from Palms.

"['The Grey'] is about attempting to see what's actually unfolding around you instead of seeing what you have decided is there," said Kensrue.

Riley Breckenridge gave an in-depth interview regarding the album in September 2018. Talking about 'Only Us' Breckenridge stated: "It’s a song about inclusion and compassion and togetherness — realizing that we’re all connected and should be able to rally around that to make the world a better place.".

Palms was produced by Eric Palmquist, whom the band had worked with in the past. Breckenridge also spoke about working with Palmquist on this record saying: "He's great to work with. We communicate really well. He pushes me hard, but he's also a really patient and encouraging person, which is invaluable in a studio setting."

Through an Instagram post on March 1, 2019, Thrice announced a new EP; Deeper Wells. It consists of four new tracks recorded during the Palms sessions. The EP was released on 12" vinyl for Record Store Day on April 13, 2019.

=== Horizons/East & Horizons/West (2021–present) ===
On July 20, 2021, Thrice released a single, "Scavengers". On the same day, they also announced their new album Horizons/East via Epitaph Records to be released digitally on September 17, 2021, with a physical release on October 8, 2021. In an Interview on the new record the band announced that they had actually written 20 songs, of which only 10 were included on the record. The rest was announced to be released on a companion record called Horizons/West.

On May 17, 2022, Thrice released a single, "Dead Wake", recorded during the Horizons/East sessions but never made the album. They released another B-side on September 20, 2022, called "Open Your Eyes and Dream".

In honor of the 20th anniversary of The Artist in the Ambulance, the band released a rerecorded version of the album on February 1, 2023, with new instrumentation and vocals, as well as guest spots from Andy Hull of Manchester Orchestra, Sam Carter of Architects, Ryan Osterman of Holy Fawn, Chuck Ragan of Hot Water Music, Mike Minnick of Curl Up and Die and Brian McTernan, who had produced the original album. "We know that playing the revisionist is a dangerous game," said Dustin Kensrue, "so we were always a little uneasy about trying to go back and mess with something that people loved, people who had none of the hangups about the record that we did. But, since we decided to do this anyway, we tried to let that wariness guide us in how we approached the record, and in the end we decided to make very minimal structural changes."

On July 22, 2025, a single, "Gnash", was released, along with the official announcement of Horizons/West after four years, which was released on October 3, 2025. A fall tour was also announced, which will start in San Diego, California on October 17th, 2025, and conclude in Anaheim, California on November 25th.

In February 2026, the band was announced as part of the lineup for the Louder Than Life music festival in Louisville, scheduled to take place in September, as well as all five stops of the 2026 Vans Warped Tour: Washington, D.C. (June 13-14), Long Beach, CA (July 25-26), Montreal, QC (Aug. 21-22), Mexico City, MX (Sept. 12-13), and Orlando, FL (Nov. 14-15). At Warped Tour in Washington D.C. the band spoke to Valentino Petrarca from The Aquarian and hinted at an anniversary show for To Be Everywhere Is To Be Nowhere. On October 20th the band announced their the anniversary show for December 3rd, 2026 at The Observatory.

Vocalist Dustin confirmed with Valentino on October 23rd that new Thrice music was in the works for a 2027 release.

== Solo activities ==
Dustin Kensrue released his first solo album on Equal Vision Records on January 23, 2007, Please Come Home. The album opened at 142 on the Billboard 200. The follow-up was released in 2008, and was called This Good Night Is Still Everywhere. This album featured two original Christmas songs and various covers of Christmas carols.

Dustin Kensrue revived his solo career by gathering Lee Neujahr (drums), Phil Neujahr (bass), and Jonny Sandu (synth) in order to form The Modern Post. The Modern Post released their first EP in 2012 called The Water & the Blood. Next, Kensrue released a worship album under his own name, The Water & the Blood, on September 30, 2013. On November 24, 2014, Kensrue's band The Modern Post released a Christmas EP, Lowborn King, that featured various Christmas songs and an alternate version of Kensrue's song, "This Is War". Kensrue's next release was on April 21, 2015, called Carry the Fire. Lastly, on March 18, 2016, Kensrue released an album of live covers of popular songs, Thoughts That Float on a Different Blood.

When asked about his next work, Dustin Kensrue said he will be working on a project with his brother that will be very different from both Thrice and his solo work.

Teppei Teranishi is in a side project with Chris Jones called Black Unicorn. Chris Jones also played drums and electric guitar on Dustin's solo album.

Dustin Kensrue provided guest vocals and Teppei Teranishi played guitar/provided production on The Out Circuit's album Pierce The Empire With a Sound.

== Musical style, influences and legacy ==
While mostly considered a post-hardcore band, Thrice has also been described as alternative rock, pop punk, experimental rock, art rock, hard rock, melodic hardcore, emo, screamo, thrash metal, indie rock, hardcore punk, heavy metal, and punk rock. While describing Thrice as post-hardcore, AllMusic's Johnny Loftus also described their sound as a mix of punk, screamo, and pop with progressive tendencies.

Thrice's first two albums, Identity Crisis and The Illusion of Safety have been described as metal and punk influenced post-hardcore. Thrice's earlier music was known for being melodic, yet fast and based in heavily distorted guitars, prominent lead guitar lines, and frequent changes in complex time signatures. This style was mainly demonstrated on their second album, The Illusion of Safety, and their third album The Artist in the Ambulance. Their first three albums have considered to have elements of thrash metal, screamo, and pop punk. On their fourth album, Vheissu, the band incorporated electronic beats, keyboards, and more experimental and nuanced songwriting. Their fifth and sixth albums, The Alchemy Index Vols. I & II and The Alchemy Index Vols. III & IV, both included two discs, six tracks each. All discs represented one of the four classical elements: Fire, Water, Earth, and Air. The albums were described as a turn to progressive rock. Each of the four parts experiment with different sounds: Fire (heavy rock), Water (trip hop), Air (atmospheric rock), and Earth (folk rock). Their seventh album, Beggars, and their eighth album, Major/Minor, included post-rock and indie influences. When describing their ninth studio album, To Be Everywhere Is to Be Nowhere, Riley Breckenridge said, "I think there is a different sound but I also think that there is a healthy nod to some of our back catalog in a lot of the music. There's stuff on this record that wouldn't necessarily feel out of place on The Artist in the Ambulance, or Vheissu or wouldn't have felt out of place if it was part of The Alchemy Index or Beggars, or Major/Minor. But at the same time it's also pushing that kind of stuff forward." Similarly, Kensrue said, "I don't know that this new record sounds like a huge jump. It's very different from Major/Minor or Beggars, but I feel like it's not this giant move." When talking about Palms, Dustin stated that "It's definitely a bit more diverse musically than the last few records. As far as the approach, it's probably most similar to Vheissu in that we were trying to pull from a very wide variety of influences" Guitar World called Thrice the "Radiohead of post-hardcore".

According to Kensrue, Thrice's initial sound was a mix of "punk rock and little bits of metal guitar tied together with a hardcore sensibility", drawing from a number of bands including Minor Threat and Iron Maiden. Over time, the band incorporated a variety of other influences, including Orchid, Saves the Day, Refused, the Dillinger Escape Plan, Metallica, Cave In, Botch, Unwound, Cloudkicker, Kowloon Walled City, Pearl Jam, Bad Religion, Stevie Wonder, Beastie Boys, Jawbreaker, Sunny Day Real Estate, Fugazi, La Dispute, Mewithoutyou, Miles Davis, Isis, Hot Snakes, No Knife, Pixies, Jimmy Smith, Thelonious Monk, and Radiohead.

Thrice have been named as a major influence to many hardcore punk, post hardcore, melodic hardcore, and metalcore bands. Architect's lead vocalist Sam Carter cited Thrice's Vheissu as an influence on their early sound, and mentions Thrice being one of his favorite bands. They have also been cited as an influence by My Chemical Romance, the Red Jumpsuit Apparatus, Underoath, Fightstar, Scary Kids Scaring Kids, Trivium and Holding Absence.

== Band members ==
- Dustin Kensrue – lead vocals, rhythm guitar, percussion
- Teppei Teranishi – lead guitar, keyboards, backing vocals
- Eddie Breckenridge – bass guitar, synthesizer, backing vocals, occasional guitars
- Riley Breckenridge – drums, percussion

== Discography ==
- Identity Crisis (2000)
- The Illusion of Safety (2002)
- The Artist in the Ambulance (2003)
- Vheissu (2005)
- The Alchemy Index Vols. I & II (2007)
- The Alchemy Index Vols. III & IV (2008)
- Beggars (2009)
- Major/Minor (2011)
- To Be Everywhere Is to Be Nowhere (2016)
- Palms (2018)
- Horizons/East (2021)
- Horizons/West (2025)

== Awards and nominations ==
=== OC Music Awards ===
Year	Nominee / work	Award	Result
2012	Major/Minor	Best Album	Nominated
2012	Promises	Best Song	Nominated
2012	Thrice	Best Rock band	Nominated
