= Louis Posen =

American music producer (born 1971)

- Born: 1971; Los Angeles, California, U.S.
- Education: California State University, Northridge (film studies, not completed)
- Occupation: Music producer · Record label executive · Philanthropist
- Years active: 1993–present
- Organizations: Hopeless Records; Sub City Records; Foundation Fighting Blindness (trustee)
- Known for: Founder of Hopeless Records; founder of nonprofit Sub City Records; pioneering ethical independent label in punk/alt rock
- Notable work: Launched Hopeless Records in 1993; created the Sub City label in 1999 and the Songs That Saved My Life series; producer of Take Action Tour
- Children: One

Louis Posen (born 1971) is an American, Los Angeles–based record producer and the founder of both Hopeless Records and Sub City Records. Posen is known as the “Paul Newman of punk rock” for his philanthropic efforts.

== Early life ==
Born in 1971, Louis Posen grew up in Los Angeles, California, United States. At age 15 he developed a passion for punk rock music after attending a concert by X at the Reseda Country Club. As a child and teenager, he also had a love for film, and he enrolled at California State University, Northridge as a film studies major, hoping to eventually become a filmmaker. However, his career plans were derailed by a diagnosis of retinitis pigmentosa at age 19, and he gravitated toward a music career.

== Career ==
Posen founded Hopeless Records in 1993 in Van Nuys in the San Fernando Valley region of Los Angeles after filming a music video with the punk rock band Guttermouth. He used $1,000 in savings and a self-help book on starting a record label to begin the business, which later signed bands such as The Wonder Years, Yellowcard, Avenged Sevenfold, Thrice, The Used, Taking Back Sunday, and All Time Low.

In 1999 Posen started Sub City Records, which has raised over $2.5 million for non-profit organizations, including groups that support blindness research, mental health, and suicide prevention. As part of his quest to create awareness for suicide prevention, Posen founded the Take Action Tour. Both Hopeless Records and Sub City Records give at least 5% of their profits to charity.

== Personal life ==
In 1994, a botched operation on his eye left Posen legally blind. He is married with one child.
