= Horizons/East =

Eleventh album by Thrice released in 2021

Studio album by Thrice
- Released: September 17, 2021
- Genres: Post-hardcore; alternative rock; ambient
- Length: 42:38
- Label: Epitaph
- Producer: Thrice

Thrice chronology
Palms (2018)	Horizons/East (2021)	Horizons/West (2025)

Singles from Horizons/East
- 1. "Scavengers" Released: July 20, 2021; 2. "Robot Soft Exorcism" Released: August 11, 2021; 3. "Summer Set Fire to the Rain" Released: September 9, 2021

Professional ratings
Aggregate scores
Source	Rating
Metacritic	73/100
Review scores
Source	Rating
Kerrang!	4/5 stars
Hysteria Mag	8/10 stars
New Noise Magazine	4.5/5 stars
Sputnikmusic	3.2/5
Distorted Sound	8/10 stars
Beats Per Minute	55%

Horizons/East is the eleventh studio album by American rock band Thrice. The album was released on September 17, 2021.

On May 17, 2022, Thrice released a single, "Dead Wake", recorded during the Horizons/East sessions but never made the album. They released another B-side on September 20, 2022, called "Open Your Eyes and Dream".

== Track listing ==
All lyrics are written by Dustin Kensrue; all music is composed by Eddie Breckenridge, Riley Breckenridge, Dustin Kensrue, and Teppei Teranishi.

No.	Title	Length
1.	"The Color of the Sky"	4:53
2.	"Scavengers"	4:52
3.	"Buried in the Sun"	3:01
4.	"Northern Lights"	3:46
5.	"Summer Set Fire to the Rain"	4:22
6.	"Still Life"	5:14
7.	"The Dreamer"	3:56
8.	"Robot Soft Exorcism"	4:24
9.	"Dandelion Wine"	4:34
10.	"Unitive/East"	3:36
Total length:		42:38

== Personnel ==
- Dustin Kensrue – vocals, guitar
- Teppei Teranishi – guitar
- Eddie Breckenridge – bass
- Riley Breckenridge – drums
- Scott Evans – mixing
- Alan Douches – mastering
