= Verra Cruz =

English rock band

Verra Curz
- Origin: St Albans, Hertfordshire, England
- Genres: Blues rock, grunge rock, hard rock
- Years active: 2003–present
- Members: Marc James; Jimmy Cooke; Henry Cross
- Past members: Nick Bright
- Website: verracruz.com

Verra Cruz, are an English rock band trio originally from St Albans, England. They formed in 2003, and have since released two studio albums and one extended play.

== Background ==
They were formed by vocalist, guitarist, and lap steel player, Marc James and drummer, Jimmy Cooke, in St Albans, England, during 2003. They would add Nick Bright as their bassist in September 2000, after his departure they filled the position with Josh Jones, while now it is occupied by Henry Cross.

== Music history ==
The band started as a music entity, under their first moniker Dust, in 1996. They released one studio album, All or Nothing, in 1996, while they would release three extended plays, See Red in 1998, Spirit in 1999, and Invisible in 2001. Their moniker would change to Verra Cruz, with their 2003 extended play release, Soul Collides, and the trio would release two studio albums, Emancipation Day in 2006, and Innocence in 2008.

They had two songs reviewed, "Corner of My Mind", and "Soul Collides".

== Discography ==
Albums

- Emancipation Day (2006, as Verra Cruz)
- Innocence (2008, as Verra Cruz)

EPs

- Soul Collides (2003, as Verra Cruz)
- Violent Sun (2016, as Verra Cruz)
