= Horizons/West =

Studio album by Thrice
- Released: October 3, 2025
- Length: 43:21
- Label: Epitaph
- Producer: Thrice

Thrice chronology
Horizons/East (2021)	Horizons/West (2025)

Singles from Horizons/West
- 1. "Gnash" Released: July 22, 2025

Horizons/West is the twelfth studio album by American rock band Thrice. It was released on October 3, 2025, via Epitaph in LP, CD and digital formats.

== Background and composition ==
Preceded by the band's 2021 full-length release, Horizons/East, the band produced the album at their New Grass studio. Vocalist/guitarist Dustin Kensrue stated about Horizons/West, "A lot of this record is about parsing reality. We're constantly being influenced by algorithms, by fear, by our own social echo chambers." "Gnash" was released as a single on July 22, 2025.

== Reception ==
Professional ratings
Review scores
Source	Rating
Kerrang!	3/5
Metal Hammer	4/5 stars
Sputnikmusic	4.0/5

In a four-star review for Metal Hammer, Matt Mills remarked, "The reliable soul and poetry, however, persist through these 11 tracks" and the album "arrives with an identity that's all its own."

The album received a rating of four-out-of-five from Kerrang!, whose reviewer Mischa Pearlman described it as "a powerful end to an ambitious, thoughtfully-crafted record, even if, overall, it doesn't quite reach the heights of which Thrice have, over the decades, shown themselves to be capable." Sputnikmusic's Sowing assigned it a rating of 4.0, noting that "Horizons/West sees Thrice perfecting their post-hiatus formula, beefing up the intensity at times, and most importantly just writing incredibly strong, moving, and memorable music."

== Track listing ==
All lyrics are written by Dustin Kensrue; all music is composed by Eddie Breckenridge, Riley Breckenridge, Dustin Kensrue, and Teppei Teranishi.

Horizons/West track listing
No.	Title	Length
1.	"Blackout"	3:08
2.	"Gnash"	2:42
3.	"Albatross"	4:29
4.	"Undertow"	4:09
5.	"Holding On"	3:35
6.	"Dusk"	1:24
7.	"The Dark Glow"	4:56
8.	"Crooked Shadows"	2:39
9.	"Distant Suns"	3:52
10.	"Vesper Light"	5:45
11.	"Unitive/West"	6:42
Total length:		43:21

== Personnel ==
Credits adapted from Tidal.

=== Thrice ===
- Eddie Breckenridge – bass, production
- Riley Breckenridge – drums, production
- Dustin Kensrue – vocals, guitar, production
- Teppei Teranishi – guitar, production, engineering

=== Technical ===
- Scott Evans – mixing, production assistance
- Matthew Barnhart – mastering

== Charts ==
Chart performance for Horizons/West
Chart (2025)	Peak position
Austrian Albums (Ö3 Austria)	60
German Albums (Offizielle Top 100)	48
German Rock & Metal Albums (Offizielle Top 100)	12
UK Album Downloads (OCC)	31
UK Independent Albums (OCC)	36
UK Rock & Metal Albums (OCC)	12
US Top Album Sales (Billboard)	34
