= The Alchemy Index Vols. III & IV =

The Alchemy Index Vols. III & IV: Air & Earth

Studio album by Thrice
- Released: April 15, 2008
- Recorded: September 2006 – June 2007
- Studio: Teppei Teranishi's home, Orange County, California
- Genre: Air: Atmospheric rock Earth: Americana, folk, roots rock
- Length: Air: 24:14; Earth: 20:54; Total: 45:08
- Label: Vagrant
- Producer: Thrice, Teppei Teranishi

Thrice chronology
The Alchemy Index Vols. I & II (2007)	The Alchemy Index Vols. III & IV: Air & Earth (2008)	Live at the House of Blues (2008)

Singles from The Alchemy Index Vols. III & IV
- 1. "Come All You Weary" Released: March 4, 2008

The Alchemy Index Vols. III & IV: Air & Earth is the sixth studio album by American rock band Thrice. It consists of the final two volumes of The Alchemy Index, a four-disc concept album that was split between two releases, the first in October 2007 and the second in April 2008. The band originally planned to release four discs at once, each disc with six tracks representing one of the four elements: Fire, Water, Earth, and Air. A blog titled The Alchemy Index chronicled the album's progress for fans. The artwork for the album was designed by Dustin Kensrue.

== Composition ==
Both discs utilized acoustic guitars, synthesizers, piano and vocal harmonies. Many of the songs across both discs are anchored by Kensrue's voice, as little additions are heard from drummer Riley Breckenridge or bassist Eddie Breckenridge; percussion is heard on five of the 12 tracks. Briefs instances of distorted guitar parts are featured, however, they are predominantly replaced by clean guitar sounds.

=== Vol. III: Air ===
Vol. III: Air is a guitar-focused atmospheric rock release, alongside acoustic and up-tempo rock tracks. The disc's overall atmosphere recalled the Appleseed Cast and The Devil and God Are Raging Inside Me (2006)-era Brand New, utilizing reverb and delay frequently. Kensrue said the disc was a summary of the other three discs; it featured some stripped-down material, electronic tracks, and full-band songs. Eddie Breckenridge cited artists he was listening to at the time as inspiration for the disc, namely Sufjan Stevens, Sigur Rós, and the Mercury Program. "Broken Lungs" is a mid-tempo track with delayed guitar parts, alongside bell chimes and a glockenspiel. Riley Breckenridge uses different drum tones and electronic drums. The bridge section sees Kensrue switching from screaming to a falsetto within a few seconds.

"The Sky Is Falling" is a pop rock song, which talks about the fallout of the September 11 attacks. It employs a number of effects, such as feedback, hammer-ons and echo-filled guitar work. "A Song for Milly Michaelson" is a minimalistic track with a repetitive guitar part and gentle vocals from Kensrue, which recalled Pedro the Lion frontman David Bazan. Gusts of wind are heard and build, alongside a reverb-hampered piano line. "Daedalus" discusses the Greek figure of the same name and his son Icarus, which the band previously talked about with "The Melting Point of Wax" from their third studio album The Artist in the Ambulance (2003). It has several bending guitar parts, and showcases Kensrue's aggressive vocal ability. It is a post-hardcore track, and was reminiscent of A Types (2004) and Magnetic North (2007)-era Hopesfall. "As the Crow Flies" sees Kensrue whispering throughout it, repeating the line "Fly over me"; it is followed by "Silver Wings", which incorporates the use of a breakbeat alongside organic drums.

=== Vol. IV: Earth ===
Vol. IV: Earth is an Americana, folk and roots rock release, inspired by soul music. It featured stripped-down, acoustic instrumentation, such as banjos, tambourines, piano, acoustic guitars, horns and upright bass. It channelled a mix of Bob Dylan, the National, Led Zeppelin and Murder by Death. The disc drew comparisons to Kensrue's debut solo album Please Come Home (2007); one track he planned to include on his solo album made its way onto the earth disc. "Moving Mountains" sees Kensrue rehash 1 Corinthians 13, which talks negatively of any act that lacks love. The blues-indebted guitar work utilizes hammer-ons and pull-offs, backed by arpeggios. The song almost ended up on Please Come Home; it was based on a guitar riff that Eddie Breckenridge came up with, which the band re-wrote and expanded on. "Digging My Own Grave" sees the earth as being the figure of death for a man living a chaotic life. It encapsulates the man's fear of his lifestyle being his own demise. Donia Lee contributes additional vocals to the track, which also features woodwind instrumentation and finger snapping. Kensrue's vocals sit atop a jazz-esque piano progression.

Thrice covered the Frodus song "The Earth Isn't Humming", which they turned into a slow-tempo country-esque track, complete with banjos. All of the members were big fans of Frodus and had wanted to cover one of their songs for sometime. Teranishi decided to create a demo of the track in the style of the earth disc, which the rest of the band liked. "The Lion and the Wolf" consists of solely a piano and Kensrue's vocals. "Come All You Weary" uses the earth as a metaphor to unite the human race, and sets up unanimity among one another. It features an organ, against a repetitive acoustic guitar chord progression. For "Child of Dust", the group put a microphone in a coffin and buried it in full-funeral style. The track becomes muffled over time, eventually closes with the sound of shovels clinking into dirt and rocks. It features backing vocals from Aushua, Nick Bogardus, Brent Kredel and Brett Williams, alongside trumpets and a repetitive piano line.

== Release ==
The first half, The Alchemy Index Vols. I & II: Fire & Water, was released on October 16, 2007. On January 23, 2008, The Alchemy Index Vols. III & IV: Air & Earth was announced for release in three months' time. On February 5, 2008, the album's track listing was posted online. Throughout the month, the group went on a headlining Canadian tour with support from Say Anything and Attack in Black. "Come All You Weary" was made available for streaming through the group's Myspace profile on February 29, before being released as a single on March 4. It featured an acoustic version of "The Whaler", a remix of "Digital Sea", and the music video for said track. Later that month, "Broken Lung" was posted on their Myspace on March 28, 2008.

The Alchemy Index Vols. III & IV: Air & Earth was made available for streaming on April 11, before being released four days later. To promote its release, the group went on a US tour with Circa Survive and Pelican. In May 2008, the band performed at The Bamboozle festival; shortly afterwards, they appeared on Late Night with Conan O'Brien. A music video was released for "Come All You Weary" on May 27, 2008, which was followed by a UK and European tour in August. The band then appeared at the Edgefest festival in Canada. In October and November, the band supported Rise Against on their headlining tour of the US. A live album, recorded in May, titled Live at the House of Blues was released in December. A Legion of Doom remix of "Broken Lung" appeared on the Underworld: Rise of the Lycans soundtrack in January 2009.

== Reception ==
Professional ratings
Aggregate scores
Source	Rating
Metacritic	76/100
Review scores
Source	Rating
AllMusic	3.5/5 stars
Alternative Press	3.5/5
Melodic	4.5/5 stars
Metal.de	7/10
Ox-Fanzine	8/10
PopMatters	7/10
Punknews.org	3.5/5 stars
Rock Hard	10/10
Sputnikmusic	4/5
Ultimate Guitar	9.7/10

The Alchemy Index Vols. III & IV: Air & Earth was met with generally favourable reviews from music critics. At Metacritic, which assigns a normalized rating out of 100 to reviews from mainstream publications, the album received an average score of 76, based on five reviews.

AllMusic reviewer Anthony Tognazzini wore that the "tight, technically complex instrumental prowess of the band is still on display, but the mood is much more atmospheric" than the Fire and Water discs. Lauri Wessel of Ox-Fanzine said the album showed the band "moving further and further away from the former sound" of their past work. PopMatters contributor Dan MacIntosh felt that "no matter the style, all of these songs hold together well". He added that even though Thrice has been tagged as an "emo band, this widely varying recorded work proves the band easily transcends such limiting categorization". Rock Hard's Volkmar Weber, meanwhile, wore that album "can take on his mighty twin brother at any time. They fight on different fronts, but for the same cause". The staff at Ultimate Guitar said "once again the band have absolutely nailed the sonic theme for each element", though added that these discs paled in comparison to Fire and Water, something that Tim Karan of Alternative Press agreed with.

Billboard writer Christa L. Titus felt that the band "almost completely tosses the striking, guitar-heavy sound for which it's known" as the songs are "lofty to represent" the Air disc, "but surprisingly sparse" for the Earth disc. Punknews.org staff member Brian Shultz thought the Air and Earth discs "aren't quite as effective or accomplished" as the Fire and Water discs. Sputnikmusic staff writer Nick Greer said that Air was the "most problematic of the collection, and the disc suffers from the discontinuity of the sound throughout", while Earth was more of a "cool-down lap after the more developmental and progressive preceding discs". Melodic staff writer Tom Spinelli said Air displays the band's skill at composing "these emotive, passionate, heartfelt songs, breaking them away from their post hardcore past". Earth "starts us off with a more laid back feel whilst maintaining that melodic energy of The Alchemy Index [project] as a whole".

The Alchemy Index Vols. III & IV: Air & Earth debuted at number 17 on the Billboard 200, selling 21,400 copies in its first week. It charted on three other component charts: number 1 on Independent Albums, number 4 on Alternative Albums and Top Rock Albums. Outside of the US, it reached number 13 in Canada, and number 140 in the UK. Rock Sound ranked it at number 62 on their list of the year's best albums.

== Track listing ==
All music by Thrice, all lyrics by Dustin Kensrue.

Vol III: Air
No.	Title	Length
1.	"Broken Lungs"	4:14
2.	"The Sky Is Falling"	4:21
3.	"A Song for Milly Michaelson"	5:07
4.	"Daedalus"	6:00
5.	"As the Crow Flies"	2:22
6.	"Silver Wings"	2:10
Total length:		24:14

Vol IV: Earth
No.	Title	Length
1.	"Moving Mountains"	2:55
2.	"Digging My Own Grave"	3:04
3.	"The Earth Isn't Humming" (Frodus cover)	4:58
4.	"The Lion and the Wolf"	2:42
5.	"Come All You Weary"	4:08
6.	"Child of Dust"	3:09
Total length:		20:54

== Personnel ==
Personnel per booklet.

Thrice

- Dustin Kensrue – lead vocals, rhythm guitar
- Teppei Teranishi – lead guitar, keyboards
- Eddie Breckenridge – bass
- Riley Breckenridge – drums

Additional musicians

- Donia Lee – additional vocals ("Digging My Own Grave")
- Aushua – backing vocals ("Child of Dust")
- Nick Bogardus – backing vocals ("Child of Dust")
- Brent Kredel – backing vocals ("Child of Dust")
- Brett Williams – backing vocals ("Child of Dust")

Production

- Thrice – producer
- Teppei Teranishi – producer, engineer, mixing
- Howie Weinberg – mastering
- Dustin Kensrue – art design

== Charts ==
Chart performance for The Alchemy Index Vols. III & IV: Air & Earth
Chart (2008)	Peak position
Canadian Albums (Billboard)	13
UK Albums Chart	140
US Billboard 200	17
US Top Alternative Albums (Billboard)	4
US Independent Albums (Billboard)	1
US Top Rock Albums (Billboard)	4
