= Senses (band) =

American pop rock band

- Origin: Los Angeles, California, United States
- Genre: Pop rock
- Years active: 2019–present
- Label: Hopeless Records
- Members: Madison Taylor; Nick Sampson
- Website: www.sensestheband.com

Senses (stylized in lowercase) is an American Pop rock band formed in Los Angeles, California in 2019. The band was founded by Madison Taylor (vocals, guitar) and Nick Sampson (drums). The group initially released music independently before signing with Hopeless Records. They have released two extended plays, Take Me Out of Here (2023) and I’m Still Breathing (2025), and have toured in North America.

== History ==
=== Formation and early development ===
Senses was formed in 2019 after Taylor and Sampson met through an online advertisement seeking musical collaborators. Taylor was raised in Sacramento and Green Bay and performed in bands during high school, while Sampson was raised in Fresno and played in music ensembles before moving to Los Angeles.

The band began releasing music independently and continued writing and recording music during the COVID-19 pandemic.

=== EP releases and touring ===
In 2023, Senses released their first extended play, Take Me Out of Here. The band performed as a supporting act for other artists on North American tours.

By 2024, the band had signed with Hopeless Records. In 2025, they released the EP I’m Still Breathing and undertook their first headlining tour.

=== Musical style ===
Senses has been described as incorporating elements of pop-punk and pop rock, with lyrics focused on personal and emotional themes. The band's official website describes their sound as "emo-friendly" and "punk-curious," though independent critical analysis of their musical style remains limited.

== Band members ==
=== Current members ===
- Madison Taylor – vocals, guitar
- Nick Sampson – drums

== Discography ==
=== Extended plays ===
- Take Me Out of Here (2023)
- I’m Still Breathing (2025)

=== Selected singles ===
- "sleepwalking" (2022)
- "gonna make sure" (2023)
- "better than this" (2023)
- "every little thing" (2024)
- "tiptoeing" (2025)
- "Perfect" (originally by Simple Plan) (2026)
