= The Artist in the Ambulance =

Studio album by Thrice
- Released: July 22, 2003
- Recorded: March–April 2003
- Studios: Bearsville, Bearsville, New York; Salad Days, Beltsville, Maryland; Phase, College Park, Maryland
- Genres: Post-hardcore; melodic hardcore; emo; pop screamo
- Length: 39:34
- Label: Island
- Producer: Brian McTernan

Thrice chronology
The Illusion of Safety (2002)	The Artist in the Ambulance (2003)	If We Could Only See Us Now (2005)

Singles from The Artist in the Ambulance
- 1. "All That's Left" Released: June 17, 2003; 2. "Under a Killing Moon" Released: July 1, 2003; 3. "Silhouette" Released: October 24, 2003; 4. "Don't Tell and We Won't Ask" Released: November 18, 2003; 5. "Stare at the Sun" Released: April 4, 2004

Cover for 2023 re-recording

The Artist in the Ambulance is the third studio album by American rock band Thrice. It was released on July 22, 2003 through Island Records, becoming their first release on a major label. The band released their second studio album The Illusion of Safety in February 2002; by July of that year, they were writing material for their next album. Recording sessions were held with producer Brian McTernan at Bearsville Studios in Bearsville, New York; Salad Days Studios in Beltsville, Maryland; and Phase Studios in College Park, Maryland.

Following tours of the United States and Europe—the latter as part of the Deconstruction Tour—"All That's Left" was released as the lead single from The Artist in the Ambulance. Thrice briefly appeared on Warped Tour before the track "Under a Killing Moon" was released on a split seven-inch vinyl single with a track by Thursday. Thrice appeared at the Reading and Leeds Festivals in the United Kingdom before embarking on a European tour supporting co-headliners Rancid and Alkaline Trio. Thrice closed 2003 with another UK tour, and a US tour with Thursday and Coheed and Cambria. Thrice also toured Japan, Australia and Europe in 2004, leading into US tours; one with Poison the Well and Darkest Hour, and one supporting Dashboard Confessional on the Honda Civic Tour.

The Artist in the Ambulance received generally positive reviews from music critics, many of whom highlighted Thrice's musicianship and the quality of the songwriting. The album peaked at number 16 on the Billboard 200 chart, becoming Thrice's first entry on that chart. It topped the Top Internet Albums chart, and peaked at number 109 on the main UK Albums Chart and at number nine on the UK Rock Albums Charts. "All That's Left" appeared on three Billboard component charts; its highest peak was number 24 on the Alternative Airplay chart, on which "Stare at the Sun" reached number 39. A re-recorded version, featuring various guest vocalists, appeared in 2023.

== Background ==
In June 2000, Thrice released their debut album Identity Crisis through independent label Greenflag Records. Sometime afterwards, Louis Posen of Sub City Records took an interest in Thrice and re-issued the album. The band's second album, the Brian McTernan-produced The Illusion of Safety, followed in February 2002. Prior to this, Island Records' A&R member Robert Stevenson became interested in Thrice and saw them perform at Chain Reaction, a venue in California. The members of Thrice liked Stevenson's appreciation of the punk rock scene; he had grown up listening to New York hardcore bands and had previously signed Rival Schools. Thrice came to the attention of major labels such as Capitol, Columbia and MCA Records. Thrice toured with Anti-Flag; before or after every show on the tour, Thrice had a meeting with a representative of one of those labels. Around this time, the band was also being courted by music producer Rick Rubin.

Thrice's manager Nick Bogardus spent time at Time Bomb Recordings, which helped him make contact with Epic Records A&R member Pete Giberga. Giberga, who also enjoyed New York hardcore, said while Epic had no interest in signing Thrice, he advised Bogardus and the band which A&R people were worth talking to. In June 2002, Thrice signed to Island Records and formally announced the signing the following month. Their recording contract was for up to three albums; vocalist and guitarist Dustin Kensrue said they "felt it was the right move" for the band and would allow them to "make better music and be on the road more". Bassist Eddie Breckenridge said the label had bought the rights for the band's next album from Sub City. The same month, Thrice spent time at home writing material for their next album. The band then performed on the main stage at Warped Tour before playing club shows in October and November 2002.

== Recording ==
Thrice were adamant about working with McTernan again, whom they had enjoyed working with on The Illusion of Safety. The Artist in the Ambulance marked the first time McTernan worked on a major label release, which Eddie Breckenridge said made it "really stressful" for him. Drummer Riley Breckenridge said the band did not have much time to write new material after The Illusion of Safety because they were constantly on tour. They were under pressure to write new songs, having only brief ideas by this point, and were given two months to write material for their upcoming major-label debut. McTernan visited the band at lock-outs in southern California for pre-production work on material. Thrice wanted to expand their musical palette but were unable to experiment due to the rushed nature of the process, since they were on tour constantly and did not have enough time to write. For two weeks, drums were recorded at Bearsville Studios in Bearsville, New York, with engineer Michael Barbiero and Pro Tools operator Matt Squire; Bill Synan assisted the pair.

Thrice then went to Salad Days Studios in Beltsville, Maryland, for six weeks across March and April 2003 to record the rest of the instruments. Breckenridge felt they were not prepared upon entering the studio, saying that he would often be writing his bass parts as he was recording them, which increased the pressure for McTernan. Kensrue had a few disagreements over lyrics with McTernan, who felt "really maxed out" while in the studio because he wrote most of them there. Having no time to rest, whenever Kensrue came up with a lyric, McTernan "would know that it wasn't the best I could do, and he would tell me". Guitarist Teppei Teranishi said they used to "just throw songs together", but for this album they spent more time on arranging the songs. Thrice struggled to record guitars for "Under a Killing Moon" because of problems with tuning, resulting in them re-recording the guitars.

According to McTernan, Thrice added a megaphone to the second verse of "All That's Left" "literally 10 minutes before we had to fed-ex the song to be mixed". The strings on "Cold Cash and Colder Hearts" and "The Melting Point of Wax" were recorded at Phase Studios in College Park, Maryland. Charlie Barnett arranged and conducted the session, which involved musicians Marcio Bothello (cello), Osman Kivrak (viola), Teri Lazar (violin), Chris Shieh (violin) and Greg Watkins (double bass). Andy Wallace mixed the recordings at Soundtrack studios in New York City with assistance from Steve Sisco and Pro Tools operator Josh Wilbur. Howie Weinberg mastered the recordings at Masterdisk in New York City. The songs "Motion Isn't Meaning" and "Eclipse" were recorded during the sessions but were left off the finished album.

== Composition and lyrics ==
[It] is basically about him describing his job as an artist, a musician and a writer and his brother's job which was an EMT for a New York ambulance and how the 2 jobs are very different but the thing that binds them together is that they both need to work harder and try harder in life.

— Riley Breckenridge on the short story that gave the album its title

The Artist in the Ambulance has been classified as melodic hardcore, post-hardcore, emo, and pop screamo. It drew comparisons to the work of Blindside. Jon Wiederhorn of MTV said the album blends "thrash metal, hardcore, emo and pop punk often within a single song". Fuse called the album a "post-hardcore landmark, one that coasted into the lanes of math-metal and, yes, even pop-punk just enough to appeal to a rainbow of fans". Teranishi called The Illusion of Safety the "anti-verse-chorus-verse record"; for The Artist in the Ambulance, they "realized that if something's good, it might be worth bringing back a second time".

Breckenridge said they felt pressured by their fans to keep the same sound as their previous album, as they were worried about alienating their listeners, which stopped them from expanding their sound. He mentioned that the biggest chance they made was writing songs around vocal melodies, instead of amalgamating various guitar parts and adding vocals over the top, which allowed them to switch between the mellow and heavy sections much easier. The album's title was taken from a short story in an issue of Burn Collector by Al Burian of Milemarker; Kensrue said it "basically [asks] the question, 'Do we, as artists, have the responsibility to do something more than ... entertain?' " Riley Breckenridge said they were reading McTernan's copy of it during their spare time in the midst of The Illusion of Safety sessions.

=== Tracks ===
The Artist in the Ambulance opens with "Cold Cash and Colder Hearts", an aggressive track that showcases Teranishi's guitarwork and Kensrue's vocals. It is the result of blending two songs together; Teranishi said the "spooky" section, which refers to the part with strings and palm-muted guitars, was initially played on a guitar that was enhanced with an auto-volume delay pedal. They switched it to a heavier version that was reminiscent of the work of Isis, before settling on the final version. McTernan said Barnett's string section "really took it over the top" with the instruments doubling the sound of the palm mutes. Eddie Breckenridge originally wrote the track's 5/4 section as part of an aborted 10-minute track. Thrice unsuccessfully attempted to put the section in every track before leaving it in "Cold Cash and Colder Hearts".

"Under a Killing Moon" switches between older forms of metal and hard rock. The band wanted another heavy track; Teranishi wrote the verses' guitar riff during a practice session. The song's ending guitar riff is slower in tempo because it had been played to a slow beat from Riley Breckenridge, and was later sped up and incorporated into the track. Both riffs were influenced by the sound of Killswitch Engage, to whose work Teranishi was listening on the days he wrote the parts. The lyrics initially worked well with melodic chord progressions but did not work when the band worked on the song during a practice session. Kensrue then decided to scream the words, which he felt worked better with the final song. "All That's Left" is the result of the band's desire to experiment with more-traditional song structures with The Artist in the Ambulance; its chorus section bordered on space-esque progressive rock before being reworked. Kensrue rewrote the song's lyrics around eight times and said the final version talks about the "strength we have in our youth and the things we trade for that".

"Silhouette" includes a section Kensrue wrote in 7/8 time, which Eddie Breckenridge attempted to emulate. His part was in 13/8 and had to be re-edited to keep it in time with Kensrue's part, facilitating the addition of extra notes. Its lyrics originate from the band's first tour; Kensrue sent them to his girlfriend on the back of a postcard. He wrote them on a painting he made for her, and later reworked them into "Silhouette". The bassline of "Stare at the Sun" was initially written in a mathy, chaotic metal style that Teranishi tried to merge with "The Abolition of Man" before spinning it off into a new track. The drums were originally played in 4/4 time at 5:7 intervals before being simplified to allow Kensrue to sing over them. As a result of this, the bridge section had to be scrapped and a new one written. The beginning of "Paper Tigers" came from jamming sessions that occurred between Eddie and Riley Breckenridge following practice sessions. In its original form, the song was a metal and hardcore punk track, which was then merged with another part that became its final-chorus section. Kensrue wrote the lyrics for a piano song that was later scrapped, and added them to "Paper Tigers" towards the end of recording. "Hoods on Peregrine" is a combination of a guitar riff Kensrue wrote during practice, a 1970s-like bass part from Eddie Breckenridge, and a guitar riff Kensrue wrote during one of the coldest nights he had experienced in Omaha, Nebraska. Discussing the lyrics, Kensrue said when writing The Artist in the Ambulance, the "media was out of control. Don't take anything at face value cause everyone's got an agenda."

"The Melting Point of Wax" is the first song the band wrote after the release of The Illusion of Safety; Riley Breckenridge wrote the chorus section using an acoustic guitar. He did not like the way the track sounded with added distortion and felt Barnett's strings helped fill it out in places where he though "there were voices missing". The song went through 12 variations, which included verses in 5/4 time, before the band settled on the final version. According to Kensrue, the song is a response to people "bitching at us for decisions" they made the previous year. It is a re-telling of the Icarus mythology, which was one of his favorite myths. Kensrue said the band glorified Icarus' flight, which contrasted the "traditional interpretations [that] include shunning vanity, respecting elders, playing it safe, etc." "Blood Clots and Black Holes" is an amalgamation of riffs from Teranishi and Breckenridge, and is the second song written following The Illusion of Safety. The album's title track "The Artist in the Ambulance" was influenced by Burn Collector, which Kensrue would read while at a Starbucks coffee house. He said he discussed comparing "The Artist" and "The Ambulance" as concepts, and the "different roles they play and what contribution they make in life". "The Abolition of Man" is one of the heaviest tracks on The Artist in the Ambulance; it incorporated multiple time signatures and Arabian-style guitar riffs. It was named after C.S. Lewis's book of the same name and initially had the working title "Hot Water Metal" due to its anthemic first verse. Teranishi said his guitar parts were influenced by the early releases of Converge. "Don't Tell and We Don't Ask", the album's closing track, resulted from ideas scrapped from other songs on the album. The drums in the chorus were adapted from those in the intro to "Paper Tigers".

== Release ==
Punknews.org reported that Thrice would tour with the Used in April and May 2003. During this tour, which included a performance at Skate and Surf Fest, the band were aiming to perform new material. On April 5, 2003, The Artist in the Ambulance was announced for release in three months' time. During the next two months, the band expected to participate in the Deconstruction Tour, which visited several European countries. "Under a Killing Moon" was posted on the band's website on May 10, 2003, and the album's track listing was posted three days later. "All That's Left" was released to alternative radio on June 17 and two days later, the album's artwork was posted online.

Thrice was announced as part of on the Warped Tour line-up, which ran between June and August 2003. During one performance, Breckenridge tried removing his clothing-filled suitcase from the tour bus, which had become stuck in the cargo area. In a 2005 interview, he recalled that as soon as he freed the suitcase, "my back just went... It was like somebody stabbed me in my lower back". It exacerbated a previous injury he had sustained from skateboarding. Despite increasing pain, Breckenridge continued performing shows; he eventually stopped performing while the rest of the band continued, playing the final few Warped shows acoustically. "Under a Killing Moon" was released on a split seven-inch vinyl single with "For the Workforce, Drowning" by Thursday on July 1, 2003. A music video for "All That's Left", which was directed by the Workshop, premiered on MTV a week later.

The Artist in the Ambulance was initially planned for release on July 15, 2003, through Island Records, but was delayed until July 22 of that year. A limited edition of the album featuring special artwork, lyrics and details about each track was also released. Eddie Breckenridge explained that they took inspiration from jazz albums, which was a style that the members of the band were big fans of. Discussing the accompanying artwork, he "always want[ed] to know how bands got to a certain part, or how they exactly feel. If someone doesn't really like a song or finds something weird about a certain part of a song, it would be cool to hear why they did that". An extract from Burian's short story was included in the liner notes, alongside a link to purchase it. Five percent of the sales from the album was donated to Syrentha J. Savio Endowment, an organization that provides chemotherapy and other medication for those who cannot afford it. Thrice had previously donated money to charities while on Sub City; when they were negotiating with major labels, they made it clear they wished to continue donating money to charities. The president of Island Records had founded a charity and was supportive of the band's endeavors.

Around the time of release, the band signed autographs at in-store events. On August 21, 2003, Thrice appeared on The Late Late Show. For the rest of July 2003, Thrice were expected to perform at the Reading and Leeds Festivals in the UK before embarking on a European tour supporting Rancid and Alkaline Trio. Thrice were expected to perform on Jimmy Kimmel Live in September 2003. In October 2003, Thrice announced a UK tour, anticipating a North American tour with Thursday and Coheed and Cambria, which was planned to run into November 2003. Two weeks of this tour was headlined by the Deftones. The music video for "Stare at the Sun" was released on November 12, 2003; it was directed by Brett Simon, and depicts use of a photocopier, which Simon said "illustrate[d] a search for meaning and knowledge".

"Stare at the Sun" was released to US alternative radio on November 18, 2003. The band wanted to release "The Artist in the Ambulance" as the album's second single but Island Records wanted to release "Stare at the Sun"; the label asked program directors of radio stations for input, all of whom chose "Stare at the Sun". In December 2003, the band was announced to perform at the KROQ Almost Acoustic Christmas festival. In February 2004, Thrice planned to tour Japan before embarking on an Australian tour with Alkaline Trio and Hot Water Music. Following this, Punknews.org reported that the band would tour Europe with Coheed and Cambria, and Vaux. In March and April 2004, the band planned to tour the US with Poison the Well, Darkest Hour and Moments in Grace. In May and June 2004, the band were expected to support Dashboard Confessional on the Honda Civic Tour. Thrice then appeared on Warped Tour for a third time.

== Critical reception ==
Professional ratings
Review scores
Source	Rating
AllMusic	4/5 stars
Blender	3/5 stars
The Encyclopedia of Popular Music	4/5 stars
The Essential Rock Discography	7/10
IGN	9/10
laut.de	4/5 stars
Melodic	3.5/5 stars
Rolling Stone	2/5 stars
Sputnikmusic	4/5

The Artist in the Ambulance received generally positive reviews from music critics. AllMusic reviewer Johnny Loftus complimented McTernan for "tighten[ing] the seams that hold together Thrice's patchwork print of post-hardcore bellow, emotional bluster, and unabashed metal wankery"; he called it the band's strongest work to date. Nick Madsen of IGN said the band's tendency to "lean more towards the melodic" gave them "much more focused songs". He considered The Artist in the Ambulance the "perfect evolution of Thrice's past material" because the "direction of the music and the delivery of the actual songs have improved three-fold". Sputnikmusic writer Damrod was surprised "anew by the nice basslines" as well as the use of "octaves, [unconventional] patterns, [and] excellent fills". He summarised it by saying the band's "musicianship is on a high level, the instrumental use as well as the lyrics". Melodic webmaster Johan Wippsson wrote the band provided "a bunch of great songs that just smashes you in the face with power and raw energy".

Jasamine White-Gluz of Exclaim! similarly said Thrice "sounds better than ever", managing to "hang on to their signature melody-based songwriting". PopMatters contributor Christine Klunk found it to be "more than just three chords, lots of guttural screaming, and heavy-handed drumming" because it offers "12 surprisingly varied tracks". Jens Brüggemann writing for laut.de stated the tempo shifts in the "individual tracks ensure liveliness" with melodies that showcase the album's complex nature. CMJ New Music Report's Amy Sciarretto wrote the band sound like a mix of Face to Face, Metallica and Thursday "somehow manag[ing] to pull the feat off—without resulting in an unlistenable mess of music". Billboard reviewer Bram Teitelman expressed a similar opinion, saying the album "at times sounds like Iron Maiden, Bad Religion and Rush jamming (which sounds a lot better on disc than it looks on paper)". Belfast Telegraph writer Neil McKay remarked that the band "ticks all the right boxes for energy and noise, [but] it's too generic to be memorable". John Wiederhorn of Blender wrote; "[s]omehow, all these stylistic variations don't disrupt the music's flow, which rocks as hard as it aches". Rolling Stone writer Marie Elsie St. Leger said while the rest of the band "ably create a close facsimile of existential rage", Kensrue's words, which are "sharp, sometime political ... and even allegorical", typically get "lost in the screams".

== Commercial performance and legacy ==
Prior to release, 100,000 copies of The Artist in the Ambulance had been shipped to stores; it sold 47,500 copies in its first week of release. By July 2006, it had sold 391,000 copies in the US. The album peaked at number 16 on the Billboard 200 chart, making it their first album to do so. It topped the Top Internet Albums chart. The album reached number nine on the UK Rock Albums Chart. "All That's Left" peaked at number 24 on Alternative Airplay, number 36 on Mainstream Rock Airplay and number 37 on Active Rock. "Stare at the Sun" peaked at number 39 on Alternative Airplay. In 2019, Teranishi said the album was "undoubtedly the highest point of [Thrice's] career as far as profile and popularity are concerned."

In a 2007 interview, Riley Breckenridge said the label pushed to make Thrice and Thursday "the next grunge [movement] or whatever we were supposed to become. It just did not work". Orange County Register ranked The Artist in the Ambulance at number five on their list of the "10 best albums of the ’00s". NME included the album on their list of the "20 Emo Albums That Have Resolutely Stood The Test Of Time". Rock Sound ranked it at number 25 on their list of "modern classics", stating that it was "their first classic, introducing themselves to the world at large with a brand of unique post-hardcore that is still to be bettered". In 2019, the magazine ranked the album at number 82 on their list of the 250 greatest albums released since the publication's debut in 1999. The Color Morale covered "Stare at the Sun" for their EP Artist Inspiration Series (2017).

=== 2023 re-recording ===
On February 1, 2023, Thrice released The Artist in the Ambulance - Revisited, a re-recording of the original tracklist, to celebrate the 20th anniversary of the album and promote its anniversary tour. When discussing the recording with Spin Magazine, Kensrue said the band felt the original was "stiff" and wanted the re-recording to include the energy present in live performances. For a time, the band considered releasing a remixes album, but ultimately decided against it as they did not wish to change the music too drastically. Instead, their goal was to be "subtle" and find a middle ground between changing very little, and making it effectively unrecognisable. Kensrue said it was unlikely that the band would produce another re-recording after this, saying the material in The Artist in the Ambulance has "specific things going on with it that make sense for this project".

The album features guest vocals from Ryan Osterman of Holy Fawn, Chuck Ragan of Hot Water Music, Sam Carter of Architects, Mike Minnick of Curl Up and Die, Brian McTernan of Be Well, and Andy Hull of Manchester Orchestra.

== Track listing ==
All music by Thrice. Lyrics by Dustin Kensrue. All recordings produced by Brian McTernan.

No.	Title	Length
1.	"Cold Cash and Colder Hearts"	2:52
2.	"Under a Killing Moon"	2:41
3.	"All That's Left"	3:20
4.	"Silhouette"	3:06
5.	"Stare at the Sun"	3:23
6.	"Paper Tigers"	3:59
7.	"Hoods on Peregrine"	3:31
8.	"The Melting Point of Wax"	3:29
9.	"Blood Clots and Black Holes"	2:49
10.	"The Artist in the Ambulance"	3:39
11.	"The Abolition of Man"	2:46
12.	"Don't Tell and We Won't Ask"	3:59
Total length:		39:34

Japanese edition bonus tracks
No.	Title	Length
13.	"Eclipse"	3:23
14.	"Motion Isn't Meaning"	1:52
Total length:		44:49

=== 2023 re-recording track listing ===
No.	Title	Length
1.	"Cold Cash and Colder Hearts"	3:09
2.	"Under a Killing Moon (featuring Sam Carter)"	2:43
3.	"All That's Left"	3:19
4.	"Silhouette"	3:16
5.	"Stare at the Sun (featuring Andy Hull)"	3:24
6.	"Paper Tigers (featuring Ryan Osterman)"	4:18
7.	"Hoods on Peregrine (featuring Brian McTernan)"	3:41
8.	"The Melting Point of Wax"	3:47
9.	"Blood Clots and Black Holes (featuring Chuck Ragan)"	2:52
10.	"The Artist in the Ambulance"	3:40
11.	"The Abolition of Man (featuring Mike Minnick)"	2:53
12.	"Don't Tell and We Won't Ask"	4:10

== Personnel ==
Credits adapted from the booklet of The Artist in the Ambulance.

Thrice

- Dustin Kensrue – vocals, rhythm guitar
- Eddie Breckenridge – bass
- Teppei Teranishi – lead guitar
- Riley Breckenridge – drums

Additional musicians

- Charlie Barnett – arranger, conductor (tracks 1 and 8)
- Marcio Bothello – cello (tracks 1 and 8)
- Osman Kivrak – viola (tracks 1 and 8)
- Teri Lazar – violin (tracks 1 and 8)
- Chris Shieh – violin (tracks 1 and 8)
- Greg Watkins – double bass (tracks 1 and 8)

Production and design

- Brian McTernan – producer, engineer
- Andy Wallace – mixing
- Michael Barbiero – drum engineer
- Matt Squire – Pro Tools
- Bill Synan – engineering assistant
- Steve Sisco – mixing assistant
- Josh Wibur – Pro Tools
- Howie Weinberg – mastering
- Cold War Kids – artwork, photography

== Charts ==
2003 chart performance for The Artist in the Ambulance
Chart (2003)	Peak position
Canadian Albums (Nielsen SoundScan)	42
UK Albums (OCC)	109
UK Rock & Metal Albums (Official Charts)	9
US Billboard 200	16
US Top Internet Albums (Billboard)	1

2023 chart performance for The Artist in the Ambulance
Chart (2023)	Peak position
Scottish Albums (Official Charts)	79
UK Independent Albums (Official Charts)	13
