= Identity Crisis (Thrice album) =

Studio album by Thrice
- Released: June 6, 2000
- Recorded: December 1999, March 2000
- Studios: For the Record, Orange, California
- Genres: Hardcore punk; melodic hardcore
- Length: 35:42
- Label: Greenflag
- Producers: Paul Miner, Thrice

Thrice chronology
First Impressions (1999)	Identity Crisis (2000)	The Illusion of Safety (2002)

Identity Crisis is the debut studio album by American rock band Thrice, released on Greenflag Records on June 6, 2000. Following the release of their debut EP First Impressions and a brief break in touring, frontman Dustin Kensrue became an employee at Greene Records. Owner Andy Greene was interested in funding the band's debut album; sessions were held at For the Record in Orange, California with the band and Paul Miner as producers.

Identity Crisis received generally positive reviews from music critics, some of whom praised the album's mix of styles. After the album's release, the band gained manager Nick Bogardus and was put in contact with Louis Posen of Hopeless Records. He signed them to the Hopeless imprint Sub City Records. The label re-issued the album on March 6, 2001, when it was promoted with tours with Samiam and Midtown.

== Background and recording ==
Vocalist Dustin Kensrue met guitarist Teppei Teranishi at school through mutual friends; they quickly formed a band with bassist Eddie Breckenridge, who Teranishi was friends with. After a period of not having a drummer, Breckenridge suggested his brother Riley. Thrice recorded their debut EP First Impressions at a warehouse; the songs that featured on had been written over three months. Eddie Breckenridge was critical of its production, not aided by their producer opting to play video games instead of working. Kensrue's father funded the CD pressing of it via a loan; copies were sold at early shows and to classmates. The band took a four-month-long break before they decided to play shows again, supporting the likes of BoySetsFire, Death by Stereo, and the Ataris.

Kensrue regularly visited the Tustin, California-based record store Greene Records, which was run by Andy Greene and Ron Martinez. Martinez later learned that Kensrue was in a band that played a venue that Martinez would book shows at. Kensrue eventually got a job at the store. The band gave Greene a copy of First Impressions, he was dismissive of the release but the pair thought they had potential. He said if the band could find someone to help make a better-sounding, full-length album, he would be willing to release it. Identity Crisis was recorded and mixed at For the Record in Orange, California in December 1999 and March 2000. Death by Stereo bassist Paul Miner and the band acted as producers, with Miner also serving as the engineer; Charley Watts mastered the album at Mondophonix.

== Composition and lyrics ==
Musically, the sound of Identity Crisis has been described as hardcore punk and melodic hardcore, compared to acts such as Good Riddance and Lagwagon. Punk Planet's Kyle Ryan said it recalled the work of the Movielife "in that it jumps back and forth between hardcore and melodic punk that's poppy". The staff at Impact Press said it was "heavy on harmonies and melody blended together perfectly to balance the hardcore aggression of the music". Brian Manning of Punk Planet said it combined "Cali-style skate punk and screaming hardcore, with just a bit of metal edge thrown in". In a retrospective piece for BrooklynVegan, writer Andrew Sacher said on Identity Crisis the band were creating a form of post-hardcore that took inspiration from "SoCal skate punk and Bay Area thrash". In a 2004 interview, Eddie Breckenridge dismissed the album, saying that he "can't listen to that album and be excited about it" anymore, noting that Kensrue's "voice was a lot higher pitched". Kensrue is credited with writing all of the lyrics bar "In Your Hands" (which was written by Riley Breckenridge) and "Under Par" (which was co-written with their friend Ian Stift). In an interview, Kensrue said "As the Ruin Falls" was a piece by C. S. Lewis that they added music to. "A Torch to End All Torches" and "Under Par" deal with depression in youth.

== Release ==
Martinez said Nick Bogardus would often call the store, which he thought was a good opportunity to promote the upcoming Thrice album. Bogardus took a copy to his office and heard it over the course of a few days, and eventually visited the store to meet Kensrue. Bogardus told him that Greene and Martinez would be in Europe around the album's planned release, and told him that he would be willing to help the band. Identity Crisis was released on Greenflag Records on June 6, 2000, with distribution being handled by No Idea, Revelation Records and Sound of California. The label was purposely made for the band; it evolved out of Greene Records. The album was limited to 1,000–2,000 copies. During one show at the Chain Reaction club in California, it dawned on the band that Bogardus was taking on a managerial role, so they decided to formally ask him to be their manager.

Through the local fanzine Skratch Magazine, the band were put in contact with Louis Posen from Hopeless Records, who was interested in licensing the album. Thrice had a sense of familiarity with the label, as it was based an hour-and-a-half away from where the band was located. The members of Thrice grew up listening to several acts on Hopeless Records, such as 88 Fingers Louie and Against All Authority. Identity Crisis was subsequently re-released on March 6, 2001 by Sub City Records, a branch of Hopeless Records. Sub City's policy of donating a portion of each sale was one of the reasons the band signed with them. A portion of the proceeds went to the charity Crittenton Services for Children and Families; they selected this one as it was local. That same month, the band embarked on their first full US tour with Samiam, and then a few shows with Midtown. Identity Crisis was pressed on vinyl for the first time by Animal Style Records in 2010 with a slightly different cover.

== Reception ==
Professional ratings
Review scores
Source	Rating
AllMusic	1.5/5 stars

Identity Crisis was met with generally favorable reviews from music critics. The staff at Impact Press saw it as "really amazing stuff" as the "[r]apid-fire delivery, sing-a-long parts, swirling guitar work, chunky riffs, amazing tempo changes and infectious grooves push this album near the top of my current playlist". Manning said there was a handful of "great vocal harmonies (when they're not screaming), which I'd like to hear more often". Modern Fix writer Brian Greenaway said that Thrice "may be the only band I have ever heard of (save the Beatles, of course) where all four members lend their voices to the tracks, allowing for soaring melodies and anthem choruses that will keep this one spinning for a long, long time".

Scott Hefflon of Lollipop Magazine complimented the band for sticking to the album's title as they " flip-flops amidst hardcore roar (West Coast Revelation-style, not East Coast metalcore-style), melodic punkpop (though a little harder and with more, er, metal riffery), and, well, just plain fuckin’ metal". Ox-Fanzine's Elmar Salmutter thought that despite the "diverse influences, there is no reason to sink into an identity crisis, on the contrary" as the "end result is extremely explosive and innovative". Sacher echoed a similar sentiment, stating that while he could "spend all day picking apart the various ingredients of Thrice's sound, [...] they showed off the ability to fuse them all into something that was wholly unique". AllMusic reviewer Erik Hage said the blending was "not entirely convincing", especially as the "ordeal is anchored by oddly verbose, emo lyrics".

== Track listing ==
All lyrics written by Dustin Kensrue, except for "In Your Hands" (Riley Breckenridge) and "Under Par" (Ian Stift/Kensrue); all music composed by Thrice.

No.	Title	Length
1.	"Identity Crisis"	2:58
2.	"Phoenix Ignition"	3:31
3.	"In Your Hands"	2:47
4.	"To What End"	3:04
5.	"Ultra Blue"	3:02
6.	"As the Ruin Falls"	2:04
7.	"The Next Day"	0:57
8.	"A Torch to End All Torches"	4:10
9.	"Unquestioned Answers"	4:23
10.	"Under Par"	4:46
11.	"T & C"	4:00

=== Notes ===
- Track 10 called "Madman" was included on the original 2000 Gleenflag print, pushing "Under Par" and "T & C" to 11 and 12 respectively, but was excluded from every subsequent release of the album.

== Personnel ==
Personnel per booklet.

Thrice

- Eddie Breckenridge – bass
- Riley Breckenridge – drums
- Dustin Kensrue – lead vocals, rhythm guitar
- Teppei Teranishi – lead guitar

Production and design

- Paul Miner – producer, engineer, mixing
- Thrice – producer
- Charley Watts – mastering
- Dustin Kensrue – layout
- Ian Stift – photos
