= The Illusion of Safety (Thrice album) =

Studio album by Thrice
- Released: February 5, 2002
- Recorded: July 2001
- Studio: Salad Days, Beltsville, Maryland
- Genre: Post-hardcore; pop screamo; melodic hardcore; emo
- Length: 38:33
- Label: Sub City
- Producer: Brian McTernan

Thrice chronology
Identity Crisis (2000)	The Illusion of Safety (2002)	The Artist in the Ambulance (2003)

The Illusion of Safety is the second studio album by American rock band Thrice. It was released on February 5, 2002 through Sub City Records, who the band had previously reissued their debut studio album Identity Crisis (2000) through. They wrote new songs at a rate of two per month, prior to recording in July 2001. Sessions were held at Salad Days Studios with producer Brian McTernan. The Illusion of Safety is a melodic hardcore and post-hardcore album, with a reoccurring topic of death and religious references.

The Illusion of Safety received universal acclaim from music critics, some of whom praised the album's mix of styles. It sold 4,202 copies during its first week of release, reaching the top 20 on the Billboard Independent and Heatseekers Album charts. Thrice promoted the album with a tour with Anti-Flag and Against All Authority, before playing a few shows with Further Seems Forever. A music video was filmed for "Betrayal is a Symptom", prior to the band supporting Face to Face, and embarking on a headlining tour of the United States. A music video for "Deadbolt" was posted online, leading to a co-headlining US tour with Hot Water Music.

== Background and recording ==
Thrice released their debut studio album Identity Crisis in June 2000 through local label Greenflag Records. By September 2000, they were in the process of writing new material for its follow-up. They received rejection letters from labels that were confused by the variety in the band's sound. The band were put in contact with Louis Posen of Hopeless Records, who was interested in licensing Identity Crisis. It was subsequently re-released on March 6, 2001 by Hopeless imprint Sub City Records. To promote it, they went on tour with Samiam, and played some shows with Midtown. The band were able to write new songs at a rate of two per month in preparation for their next album. In June 2001, Thrice performed a few shows on the Warped Tour. They were in the process of seeking a producer for the new album, finding that Brian McTernan's name was mentioned on a number of albums the band was listening to. He had heard Identity Crisis and was interested, asking the band to provide him with some demos. Thrice set up a dictaphone recorder in the middle of a rehearsal space; as the band's PA system was lacking in quality, Kensrue had to yell into it for his vocals to be picked up on the recording.

McTernan thought the songs were heavy-sounding, but he was unsure if he was going to take on another project like that. He initially emailed their manager Nick Bogardus, suggesting they find someone else to work with. Bogardus responded by telling him he would be a perfect match, adding that he would supply additional demos. The following month, they recorded The Illusion of Safety with McTernan over the course of three weeks. The band had missed their flight as the airport had changed the times without informing them, prompting the band to drive from Washington, D.C. Sessions were held at Salad Days Studios, where McTernan also aided as engineer. As the band were arriving late at night, he told them to let themselves in, as beds could be found in the basement. McTernan had no familiarity with the members on a personal level, leaving him unsure if the sessions would be beneficial. It took him awhile to understand the band's direction, and for them to work out his strengths. Alan Douches mastered the recordings at West West Side.

== Composition and lyrics ==
Musically, the sound of The Illusion of Safety has been described as emo, melodic hardcore, pop screamo and post-hardcore. Lollipop Magazine writer Tim Den said its "[s]omber melodic hardcore" had "Master of Puppets fingerprints all over it". Athom of Sputnikmusic said it "perfectly blends harsh screams and blistering guitar work with clean vocals and addicting, hook filled melodies". In a retrospective piece for BrooklynVegan, writer Andrew Sacher said saw the band "more strongly embracing their hardcore, metalcore, and thrash influences while toning down the skate punk vibes" of Identity Crisis. Bassist Eddie Breckenridge said the other members began expanding their music tastes, citing that he liked jazz, Kensrue listened to Michael Jackson, and guitarist Teppei Teranishi explored pop music. Breckenridge said working with McTernan helped the band to focus on the overall atmosphere of the track, instead of simply shredding a guitar. When one interviewer asked about the reoccurring theme of death on the album, Kensrue said the "dark themes are used because you can sometimes convey something to someone’s heart when you might not be able to convey it to their brain". In another interview, the host asked about the death references in the song titles, to which Breckenridge said, "we actually changed them. They were way way more metal sounding. I think 'Stabbing Angels' was the name of one". Athom said that Kensrue's lyrics featured "literary references and religious allusions" as he "struggles with faith, dogma, and friendships".

The opening track to The Illusion of Safety is "Kill Me Quickly", which starts with metal guitar chords, switches to emo during the verse section, before returning to metal. Discussing the track, Kensrue said him and his fiancé had been through a rough patch where they were frequently arguing, and "it came to a point where we wanted it to end [... and be] able to work through it". "A Subtle Dagger" explores similar territory, with its guitar parts evoking Megadeth, which is followed by "See You in the Shallows", which recalled the material on Identity Crisis. "Betrayal Is a Symptom" deals with being disappointed in one's self as Kensrue explains: "If you're screwing something up, there's probably a reason why; the thing you're doing wrong is a symptom of something deeper". "Deadbolt" evokes 1990s hardcore and screamo, and shuns the verse–chorus–verse form of songwriting. Throughout it, Teppei's guitar parts counter Kensrue's vocals in a call-and-response manner, shifting between post-hardcore and pop-punk. "In Years to Come" opens with a speed metal guitar part, while "The Red Death" recalled the sound of Incubus. The latter is influenced by "The Masque of the Red Death" (1842) by Edgar Allan Poe, with Kensrue stating that it discusses a "point where the red death, which is a plague, has manifests itself physically, as a person". "Trust" is a power ballad; Dkelsen of OC Weekly said "To Awake and Avenge the Dead" showcased the band at their "most breakneck and raw", as its first two and a half minutes are an "all out assault". The Illusion of Safety concludes with two emocore songs, "So Strange I Remember You" and "The Beltsville Crucible", echoing the work of No Motiv. The former starts with a guitar riff in the vein of Jimi Hendrix, before switching to something similar to the work of Metallica.

== Release ==
Following recording, the band performed on the Plea for Peace and Take Action Tour alongside Alkaline Trio, Hot Water Music, and Cave In across August and September. On November 6, 2001, "Betrayal is a Symptom" was posted as a free download through the band's website. In November and December, the band supported Converge and American Nightmare on their co-headlining tour of the United States. Following this, the band toured with Piebald for two weeks in December. The Illusion of Safety was released on February 5, 2002 through Sub City Records. In the booklet, a "thank you" credit is given to police in Texas for "pulling us over three times in twenty four hours". Riley Breckenridge explained that had been pulled over when they toured Texas for the first time for not having the correct registration. A quote from "The Masque of the Red Death" is included in the booklet, which Kensrue felt went well with the album's theme. A portion of the proceeds from the release of the album were donated to A Place Called Home, a non-profit youth center in South Central Los Angeles. A release show was held at the Virgin Megastore in Costa Mesa, California; over 500 people showed up for the performance.

In February and March 2002, the group went on tour with Anti-Flag and Against All Authority. In late March, the group performed a few shows with Further Seems Forever, Hot Rod Circuit and Recover. In between tours, a music video was filmed for "Betrayal is a Symptom". In April and May 2002, the group supported Face to Face on their headlining US tour; the trek included an appearance at Skate and Surf Fest. In June, the band went on a headlining US tour with Recover and Brand New. Later in the month, the band played a handful of shows on Warped Tour. In August, the band played a one-off show, which served as a music video shoot for "Deadbolt"; it was posted online on October 3. In October and November 2002, the band went on a co-headlining US tour with Hot Water Music; they were supported by Coheed and Cambria. In May 2004, A Place Called Home established the Sub City/Thrice Scholarship, offering six students the chance to take a year's worth of performance lessons and learn professional music theory. By June 2007, The Illusion of Safety had raised over $100,000 for A Place Called Home. Coinciding with the band's farewell tour, the album was re-pressed on vinyl in June 2012. They performed it in its entirety at the 2022 Furnace Fest, and for a series of shows at the House of Blues in Anaheim, California, to celebrate the album's 20th anniversary.

== Reception and legacy ==
Professional ratings
Review scores
Source	Rating
AllMusic	4.5/5 stars
The Boston Phoenix	3.5/5 stars
Pitchfork	6.0/10
Punknews.org	4.5/5 stars
Sputnikmusic	5/5

The Illusion of Safety was met with universal acclaim from music critics. AllMusic reviewer Jason Anderson highlighted its mixes of styles: "Atypically dynamic for its genre, Thrice stabs at punk-pop with grandiose guitar harmonies, hardcore vocal wails, and a Metallic (note the big "M") chunk that transforms its emo turnarounds into progressive hardcore theater". Punknews.org staff member Chris Moran echoed a similar statement, listing off various forms on the first four tracks, before stating that "every track is incredible". Pitchfork contributor Brad Haywood said despite the "stylistic gumbo", the band "deserves some props", especially as in "terms of their hardcore/metal riffing capabilities, Thrice has the skills to get the job done".

Ox-Fanzine writer Joachim Hiller found it to be the "best of all possible worlds between nasty biting new school hardcore, highly melodic Californian style punk rock and emo/screamo elements," highlighting the band's strength of the "clever combination of all these elements in sometimes even just one song". Brian Greenaway of Modern Fix said the "myriad acts out there attempting to meld melodic harmonies with heavy, relentless guitars would do well to take a page out of Thrice's playbook". In a retrospective piece, Athom reiterated this, saying that "thousands of bands that popped up after its release, trying in vain to capture the power and majesty hidden within its thirty-eight minutes".

The staff at Impact Press said Kensrue's singing "nicely offsets the force of the screaming, and more importantly doesn¹t sound wimpy". Den added to this, saying that his "gut-wrenching-yet-tuneful delivery will have you pumped with drama". Greenaway was surprised by Kensrue's "ability to actually sing", easily separating them from their emo peers, while Sean Richardson of The Boston Phoenix wrote that Kensrue "purges his emo demons without ever turning into a cry-baby". Sacher said that while a listener was able to point out singers Kensrue was channelling on Identity Crisis, he would "become one of the most distinct vocalists of the emo/post-hardcore boom" on The Illusion of Safety.

The Illusion of Safety sold 4,202 copies in its first week of release. It peaked at number 14 on the Billboard Independent Albums chart, and number 20 on Heatseekers Albums chart. By July 2006, it had sold 167,000 copies in the US. Sacher said it "would go on to help define the early 2000s post-hardcore boom"; Jack Rogers of Rock Sound similarly called it a blueprint for the emo genre. Wolves at the Gate covered "Deadbolt" for their Back to School (2013) EP, while the Red Jumpsuit Apparatus covered "Trust" for the compilation Songs That Saved My Life Volume 2 (2019).

== Track listing ==
All music by Thrice, all lyrics by Dustin Kensrue.

No.	Title	Length
1.	"Kill Me Quickly"	2:46
2.	"A Subtle Dagger"	1:48
3.	"See You in the Shallows"	2:35
4.	"Betrayal Is a Symptom"	2:49
5.	"Deadbolt"	3:00
6.	"In Years to Come"	2:16
7.	"The Red Death"	2:14
8.	"A Living Dance Upon Dead Minds"	3:32
9.	"Where Idols Once Stood"	3:08
10.	"Trust"	2:54
11.	"To Awake and Avenge the Dead"	3:06
12.	"So Strange I Remember You"	3:42
13.	"The Beltsville Crucible"	4:37

== Personnel ==
Personnel per booklet.

Thrice

- Dustin Kensrue – lead vocals, guitar
- Teppei Teranishi – guitar
- Eddie Breckenridge – bass guitar
- Riley Breckenridge – drums

Production and artwork

- Brian McTernan – producer, engineer
- Alan Douches – mastering
- Cold War Kids - design, photo

== Charts ==
Chart performance for The Illusion of Safety
Chart (2002)	Peak position
US Independent Albums (Billboard)	14
US Heatseekers Albums (Billboard)	20
