= The Alchemy Index Vols. I & II =

The Alchemy Index Vols. I & II: Fire & Water

Studio album by Thrice
- Released: October 16, 2007
- Recorded: September 2006 – June 2007
- Studio: Teppei Teranishi's home, Orange County, California
- Genre: Fire: Post-hardcore; Water: Ambient electronic, trip hop
- Length: Fire: 22:09; Water: 27:05; Total: 49:14
- Label: Vagrant
- Producer: Thrice, Teppei Teranishi

Thrice chronology
Vheissu (2005)	The Alchemy Index Vols. I & II: Fire & Water (2007)	The Alchemy Index Vols. III & IV (2008)

The Alchemy Index Vols. I & II: Fire & Water is the fifth studio album by American rock band Thrice. It consists of the first two volumes of The Alchemy Index, a four-disc concept album about the four elements: Fire, Water, Earth, and Air. The band had issues with Island Records, who tried to change their sound with their fourth studio album Vheissu (2005). By July 2006, they were working on its follow-up, which would become The Alchemy Index project; recording sessions were held between September 2006 and June 2007 at guitarist Teppei Teranishi's house in Orange County, California. The Fire disc revolved around the band's post-hardcore sound that was prevalent on their older releases, while the Water disc focused on the Ambient electronic and trip hop genres.

The Alchemy Index Vols. I & II: Fire & Water received generally favourable reviews from music critics, some praising Thrice's decision to experiment with their sound, while others felt the band followed the themes too directly. It peaked number 24 on the US Billboard 200, as well as charting in Canada and the United Kingdom. Island Records was dismayed by the lack of a radio-friendly song; the band left the label and signed with Vagrant Records. They supported the album with appearances at the Reading and Leeds Festivals in the UK, prior to a US tour alongside Brand New and MewithoutYou; a music video was later released for "Digital Sea".

== Background ==
Thrice released their fourth album Vheissu through major label Island Records in October 2005, peaking at number 15 on the United States Billboard 200 chart. The album saw the band experiment with a variety of styles, channelling them through their own sound. The band supported it with tours of the US, Europe, Japan and Australia. Upon delivering the album to the label, they were unsure what to do with it as they thought it had no single-sounding songs. The band had a meeting with Island Records' president L.A. Reid, during which they showed him the second single from Vheissu, "Red Sky". Drummer Riley Breckenridge said it was an uncomfortable event, as they noticed Reid was only pretending to like the track. They soon realised that Island Records was no long a good fit for them; while they appreciated A&R member Robert Stevenson, they knew his superiors did not understand the band.

Breckenridge thought that Thrice were not ticking the "boxes that people needed to hear"; they were tired of fighting against the label, who were trying to change them into a "rock band". In early July 2006, the band announced they were working on a follow-up to Vheissu. Later that month, the group revealed their plan for a four-disc concept album, that could potentially contain upwards of 25 songs. Frontman Dustin Kensrue took a break from the process to go on a solo tour in July and August. In September, the band gave further details of the project, saying that it would be based on the elements. Breckenridge said Kensrue had proposed the concept during one occasion when they were touring the US East Coast. He had woken up in the middle of the night with the idea; though he dismissed it as a late night thought, he continued to tell the rest of the band about it. Kensrue had considered making it a solo project instead of a Thrice album. He had previously considered making a concept EP revolving around the Icarus mythology. That same month, the group embarked on a short US tour alongside These Arms Are Snakes and Planes Mistaken for Stars.

== Production ==
Recording sessions began in September 2006, with recording taking place at their own studio in guitarist Teppei Teranishi's home, located in Orange Country, California. It was done in contrast to the previous albums, which were made on the East Coast. They followed a schedule of 9-5; it enabled the members to have a better working relationship and allowed for family matters, such as Teranishi and Kensrue becoming fathers. Teranishi acted as engineer, and him and the band received separate producer credits; Teranishi had previously produced Kensrue's debut solo album. The band planned to record four EPs of material at the same time. To track the writing and recording progress of the project, the band had an online studio journal at Alchemyindex.com.

In the first entry from late October 2006, Kensrue revealed the group's plan for recording, which was to do 3/4s of each element and subsequently return later on "and re-evaluate, start mixing, and tie up any loose ends." At this early stage, they had completed a significant portion of the air disc and had just begun working on the earth disc. For this later element, they set themselves to have it done in a week, since they wanted it to "have a pretty stripped down vibe and we don't want to have time to over-think it." It was recorded inside a room with wooden floorboards. The earth disc was completed by early November, as work on the water disc began. Towards the end of the month, they shifted to jamming on material for the fire disc, while working on material for the water disc alongside this.

Recording for the fire disc began at the start of December and continued until the middle of the month, when the group took a break for the Christmas period. Teranishi found this disc to be the hardest to record for because there were "SO many [instruments] fighting for the same sonic space". When they returned to the studio in early January 2007, they spent a few days reassessing some of the material they recorded up to that point. Kensrue spent a week in New York City to promote his solo work, leaving the band to continue with his absence. The band took a break from recording in February and March to go on an Australian tour with Deftones, and after they returned, they started tying up the loose ends.

Another break occurred when they embarked on an east coast US tour in April and May 2007 with Norma and the Receiving End of Sirens; recording concluded in June 2007. They utilized early takes and demo recordings; Kensrue said they cared more about "capturing the moment" instead of "the perfect take". Teranishi played several single-coiled guitars, used a Vox AC30 amplifier frequently, and a Marshall JCM800 head for the heavier-sounding guitar parts. He employed the use of delay pedals; the band used phaser/chorus effects for the water disc since those effects had the tonality of water. The air disc utilized reverb and delay effects. Teranishi finished the final recordings in June, before they were mastered the following month by Howie Weinberg at Masterdisk.

== Composition ==
=== Overview ===
Discussing the project's name, Kensrue said he received a copy of the book Alchemy and Mysticism: The Hermetic Museum; it contained drawings and theories on how the elements interact with one another. Teranishi said the band liked it as it appealed to the core belief as a unit: "an amalgamation of a bunch of different things for all of us personally." The overall idea for The Alchemy Index came to Kensrue one night while in the group's touring van. The further he mulled over the idea, the more he felt it would work perfectly as the group's future direction. Teranishi said the group were hesitant towards his idea, unsure if they would be able to make it work. They planned out what they thought each element would sound like, coming up with a rough draft. Breckenridge said instead of trying to make the songs fit into their existing sound, as they had on Vheissu, "it was like, no, let's write an electronic and key-based song ... We don't need to chop everything up".

The members wrote bits of material that they felt would fit within said element. From this, they began fleshing out the songs. Kensrue said there was some difficulty in making the project work as a whole without it coming across as a single song. The concept is split into four separate elements (fire, water, air and earth), with each one consisting of six songs and lasting under half-an-hour in length. The closing tracks of each volume are sonnets, laid out in traditional English form; Kensrue often struggled with writing lyrics since it revolved around how the words would sound, as opposed to the words themselves. He decided on sonnets since he felt they read better than being sung. He wrote them from the viewpoint of each "spirit" of the element; at the time, he was reading The Lord of the Rings by J. R. R. Tolkien and Velvet Elvis: Repainting the Christian Faith by Rob Bell.

=== Vol. I: Fire ===
Vol. I: Fire is centered around the group's older melodic post-hardcore sound of their early releases, channelling the influence of Deftones, Isis and Pelican. It features riff-based guitar work, screaming, different tunings and time signatures, while continuing the stylistic evolution of the Vheissu tracks "Hold Fast Hope", "The Earth Will Shake" and "Like Moths to Flame". The lyrics incorporate metaphors for fire, alongside detailing rebellion through the contexts of history and religion, and the urge to break free from people oppressing the listener; this style of lyrical content recalled the band's The Artist in the Ambulance (2003) track "Paper Tigers" and the Vheissu track "Between the End and Where We Lie". "Firebreather" opens with a heavy guitar riff, which is then repeated in the verses on bass guitar, and ends with the inclusion of choral singing, which consisted of Aushua, their manager Nick Bogardus, Brent Kredel and Brett Williams.

"The Messenger" features the use of the harmonic minor scale, earning a comparison to As Cities Burn, while the programmed drum parts were compared to the Prodigy. During the track, Kensrue quotes Isaiah, the Israelite prophet. "The Messenger" and "Backdraft" incorporate chromaticisms and elements of electronic music, drawing comparison to the Prodigy in their tonality. "Backdraft" builds upon its initial sound of droning, drum beats and an acoustic guitar. The guitar riff of "The Arsonist" recalled "Blood Clots and Black Holes" from The Artist in the Ambulance. The bridge section used distortion and chorus pedals, in the vein of The Shape of Punk to Come (1998)-era Refused. The track was reminiscent of Coheed and Cambria, and was followed by the fuzz pedal-laden track "Burn the Fleet" which showcases Kensrue's vocal ability, and guitar parts that resembled OK Computer (1997)-era Radiohead. "The Flame Deluge" incorporated synthesizers, and was compared to Vangelis and Isis. It was built off a string section that Teranishi had created on the Reason software; its lyrics reference World War II.

=== Vol. II: Water ===
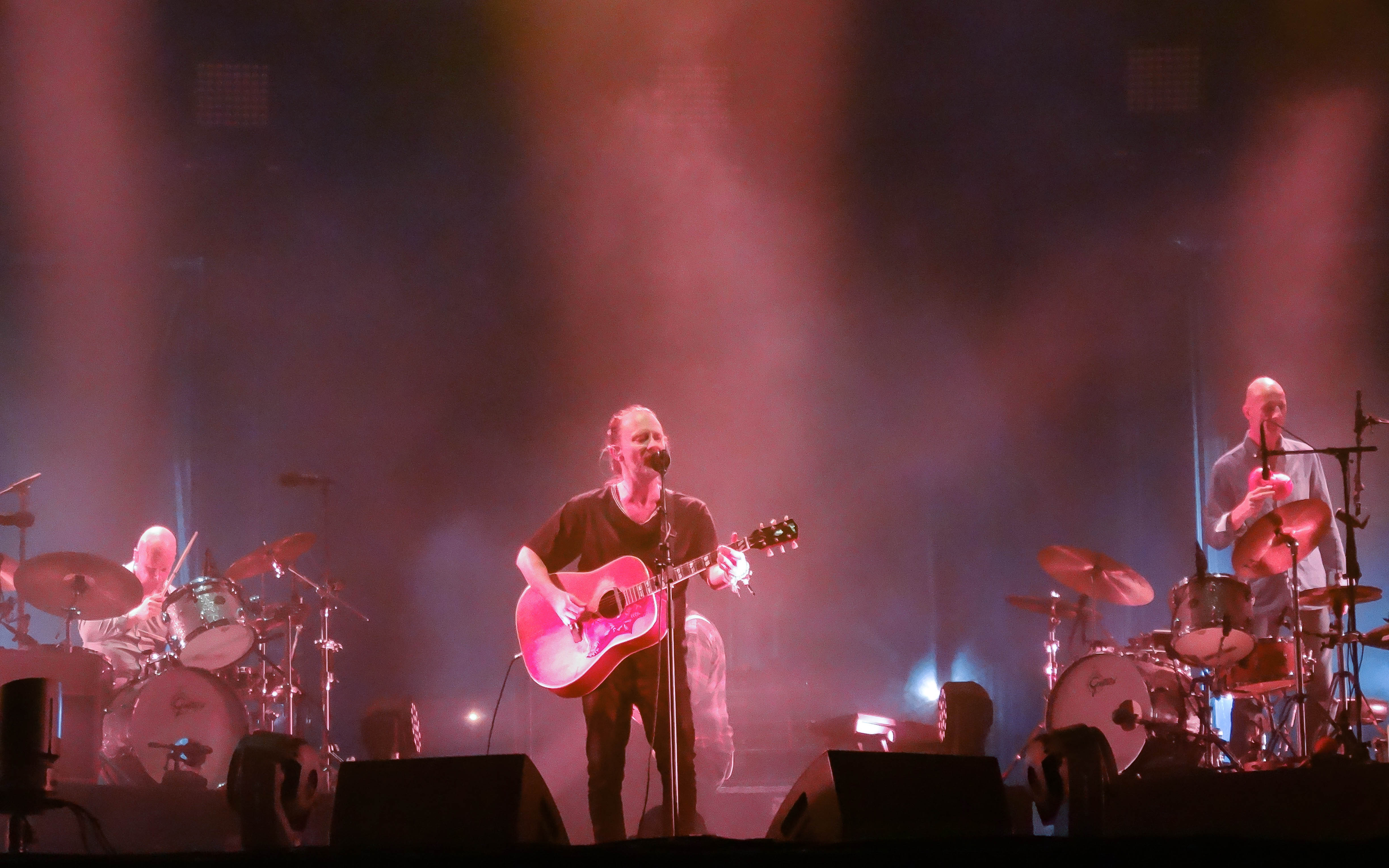
The Water volume drew multiple comparisons to Kid A (2000)-era Radiohead.

Vol. II: Water consists of ambient electronic and trip hop music, interspersed with metaphors for the ocean. Water imagery, and the music that would lay the foundation for this disc, was previously employed in a few songs from Vheissu, namely "Between the End and Where We Lie", "Atlantic" and "Red Sky". It drew comparison to Kid A (2000)-era Radiohead, Coldplay (Kensrue was equally compared to their frontman Chris Martin), and Dredg, channelling the influences of Sigur Rós, Team Sleep and Pop Will Eat Itself member Clint Mansell. It featured harmonies in the vein of the Beach Boys, programmed beats, synthesizers, piano, and Kensrue's vocals being washed in echo and reverb. "Digital Sea" bordered on electronica, and was reminiscent of Team Sleep. "Open Water" starts with a reverb-enhanced organ, before shifting into Coldplay-like alternative rock. The R&B-indebted "Lost Continent" featured piano in the vein of Radiohead and sees Kensrue show off his vocal range. Its orchestral score recalled the aforementioned "Atlantic", and "Unintended" by Muse.

The instrumental track "Night Diving" has a post-rock structure, based on a riff and building to a crescendo. It incorporates a synthesizer, chimes and a glockenspiel, alongside the group's typical distorted guitar and bass instrumentation. The track originally existed as a storyline about a guy diving at night time, and detailed the things he saw. They mapped it out and correlated it to the instrumentation of the song. The opening resembles the guy on a boat, and when the drums begin, the guy jumps into the ocean in scuba gear. He gradually sinks as the track continues, observing a sperm whale fighting against a giant squid. A vocoder part is heard, as the man encounters sirens, eventually emerging from the water. "The Whaler" is sung from the perspective of a daughter wishing her father would return home from a voyage. It integrates double-tracked vocals, mixed in with a synthesizer, giving it an artificial sound and echo. It was referred to as a cross between Depeche Mode and the Beach Boys. The closing song "Kings Upon the Main" evokes the electronica sound of Dntel.

== Release ==
Breckenridge said that while it was not talked about, the project would serve as a way for Thrice to get out of their contract with Island Records. They anticipated the label's reaction to be dismissive, which ultimately happened. Stevenson hoped that in the batch of 24 songs there would be at least one single-ready song. The band had one unused demo that they did not like, which Stevenson was adamant about including it, to which the band repeatedly told him it would not be featured. Stevenson had been fighting in support of the band for sometime, but had reached the point where he thought it was no longer worth the effort. In January 2007, Kensrue said he was unsure how they were going to release the project, suggesting two individual double-disc releases with a gap of a few months between them. He compared it to Radiohead recording Kid A and Amnesiac (2001) during the same sessions and releasing them separately. That same month, Melodic reported the band would be releasing two-EP sets in a few months' time. While compiling the finished release, Island Records was dismayed at the lack of a radio-friendly single, and suggested parting ways. Around this time, focus from the band was shifting as Kensrue and Teranishi were starting families, and were tired of the tour–record–tour cycle.

By June 2007, the band announced their departure from the label, citing a difference in vision for their direction. They had to go through some legal battles to acquire the rights to the project. Subsequently, the band were shopping for a new label to release the project; on August 9, the band announced they had signed to Vagrant Records. Vagrant founder Rich Egan, who the group were friends with, had wanted to sign the band since their time on Sub City Records. The Alchemy Index Vols. I & II: Fire & Water was planned for release in two months' time, while the last two instalments were set for release sometime next year. The band felt this was the best way to approach releasing the project, as they felt releasing 24 tracks together would be too much for people to consume. Between the announcement and the release date, the group ten teaser videos. The track listing for the first two volumes was revealed on August 22, 2007. Following this, the band performed at the Reading and Leeds Festivals in the UK.

"Firebreather" and "Digital Sea" premiered through Spinner.com on September 17, 2007, before being uploaded on the band's Myspace account the following day. The Alchemy Index Vols. I & II: Fire & Water was made available for streaming through the group's Myspace profile on October 12, 2007, before being released four days later. The artwork was planned to be created by Dave Eggers, however due to time constraints, Kensrue handled it instead; the CD booklet features medieval drawings which relate to the Fire and Water elements. A portion of the sales went to the Blood: Water Mission charity, which promotes clean water efforts in Africa. Between October and December, the group embarked on a US tour with Brand New and MewithoutYou. A music video was released for "Digital Sea" on January 16, 2008, via Myspace. In 2009, the four elements were released together as a box set, with each element being pressed on 10" vinyl. The set was later re-pressed in 2017. That same year, the band incorporated a suite of songs from The Alchemy Index into their November–December US tour.

== Reception ==
Professional ratings
Aggregate scores
Source	Rating
Metacritic	65/100
Review scores
Source	Rating
AllMusic	3/5 stars
The A.V. Club	B−
Blender	2/5 stars
Cross Rhythms	10/10 stars
Melodic	3/5 stars
NME	6/10
Now	4/5
Rolling Stone	3/5 stars
Sputnikmusic	4.5/5

The Alchemy Index Vols. I & II: Fire & Water was met with generally favourable reviews from music critics. At Metacritic, which assigns a normalized rating out of 100 to reviews from mainstream publications, the album received an average score of 65, based on 12 reviews.

Andrew Earles of The A.V. Club wrote that Fire "showcases the still-maturing, melodic, sometimes very heavy post-hardcore that Thrice is forging a career out of". Alternative Press writer Tim Karan praised the discs for being "often experimental and occasionally brilliant". He acknowledged that Fire did not stray too far from the band's roots, though Water "would be almost unrecognizable as Thrice" if not for Kensrue's vocals. He went on to say that if an "unknown band were to release [Water], it’d probably be hailed as earth-shakingly original". The staff at Now said that the two discs were "extremely well-produced, compact mini-albums full of the straightforward heaviness of earlier releases, and significantly progressive in scope and dynamic". Sputnikmusic staff writer Nick Greer said that apart from some "questionable aspects to both discs, but in general the cons are vastly outweighed by the pros", feeling that the band have "produced another stunner". Cross Rhythms writer Ben Martin said the two discs "only edify their presence as eminent songwriters and musicians".

AllMusic reviewer Andrew Leahey wrote that his issue with the discs was not "necessarily the music, since the 'Fire' disc is very similar to Thrice's previous work. Rather, the group simply handles these discs too literally". He added that the project "lacks, then, is integration. There's no crossover between the two elements/styles, and the whole effort seems stilted as a result". Daniel Martin of NME said the two discs "ambient soundscapes doubling up to cancel each other out. Ridiculous, yes, but to Thrice's credit, wanting to be Deftones [...] is a noble endeavour. But the results are still clunky". Billboard's Katie Hasty said "this smart and fascinating album could use some subtlety, rather than bashing the concepts into the earth". Blender writer Alex Benenson saw the album as a disappointment as he felt Fire was "all caustic blasts, with sledgehammer guitars", while Water was a "meditation on isolation and infinity, suffused in lakes of reverb and wan sonar blips". In a review for Rolling Stone, journalist David Fricke said the band "define fire and water music too literally", adding that splitting the project into "awkward chunks of opera violates a fundamental rule of prog rock: Go all the way out, or don't go at all".

The Alchemy Index Vols. I & II: Fire & Water debuted at number 24 on the US Billboard 200, selling 28,000 copies in its first week. It charted on three other component charts: number 1 on Independent Albums, number 7 on Alternative Albums, and number 10 on Top Rock Albums. Outside of the US, it reached number 20 in Canada, and number 114 in the UK.

== Track listing ==
All music by Thrice, all lyrics by Dustin Kensrue.

Vol. I: Fire
No.	Title	Length
1.	"Firebreather"	4:24
2.	"The Messenger"	2:09
3.	"Backdraft"	4:08
4.	"The Arsonist"	4:13
5.	"Burn the Fleet"	3:46
6.	"The Flame Deluge"	3:27
Total length:		22:09

Vol. II: Water
No.	Title	Length
1.	"Digital Sea"	3:44
2.	"Open Water"	3:46
3.	"Lost Continent"	4:30
4.	"Night Diving"	6:02
5.	"The Whaler"	4:09
6.	"Kings Upon the Main"	4:56
Total length:		27:05

== Personnel ==
Personnel per booklet.

Thrice

- Dustin Kensrue – lead vocals, rhythm guitar
- Teppei Teranishi – lead guitar, keyboards
- Eddie Breckenridge – bass
- Riley Breckenridge – drums

Additional musicians

- Aushua – group vocals ("Firebreather")
- Nick Bogardus – group vocals ("Firebreather")
- Brent Kredel – group vocals ("Firebreather")
- Brett Williams – group vocals ("Firebreather")

Production

- Thrice – producer
- Teppei Teranishi – producer, engineer, mixing
- Howie Weinberg – mastering
- Dustin Kensrue – art direction

== Charts ==
Chart performance for The Alchemy Index Vols. I & II: Fire & Water
Chart (2007)	Peak position
Australian Albums (ARIA)	93
Canadian Albums (Billboard)	20
UK Albums Chart	114
US Billboard 200	24
US Top Alternative Albums (Billboard)	7
US Independent Albums (Billboard)	1
US Top Rock Albums (Billboard)	10
