= Please Come Home =

Studio album by Dustin Kensrue
- Released: January 23, 2007
- Recorded: 2006
- Genre: Alternative country, country blues, country folk
- Length: 29:41
- Label: Equal Vision
- Producer: Teppei Teranishi

Dustin Kensrue chronology
Please Come Home (2007)	This Good Night Is Still Everywhere (2008)

Professional ratings
Review scores
Source	Rating
Allmusic	3.5/5 stars
Spin	4/10

Please Come Home is the first studio album by Dustin Kensrue, released in 2007.

== Songs ==
The album contains eight songs, which Kensrue has emphasized was a reflection of the albums/EPs he used to buy as a kid.

== Recording ==
The album was recorded in the studio of Thrice lead guitarist Teppei Teranishi, who also played piano and organ on the album. Electric guitars and drums were recorded by long-time friend and Thrice guitar technician, Chris Jones.

== Release ==
The album was planned for release in October 2006, but was delayed to 2007 due to issues recording and acquiring a label to distribute it.

On October 10, 2006, it was announced that Kensrue had signed with Equal Vision Records, and that the label would release his debut solo album. On November 7, "I Knew You Before" was made available for streaming via Kensrue's Myspace account. Please Come Home was released on January 23, 2007 through Equal Vision. In June, Kensrue went on a tour of the U.S. alongside Tom Morello of Rage Against the Machine.

== Tracks ==
1. "I Knew You Before" - 3:55
2. "Pistol" – 3:44
3. "I Believe" – 2:46
4. "Please Come Home" – 3:41
5. "Blood & Wine" – 1:59
6. "Consider the Ravens" – 4:15
7. "Weary Saints" – 4:08
8. "Blanket of Ghosts" – 5:13

=== iTunes bonus tracks ===
1. "Please Come Home for Christmas" – 2:44
2. "Go Tell It On The Mountain" – 3:15
3. "Silent Night" – 3:50
