= Burn Collector =

Burn Collector is a perzine written and published by Berlin-based writer and musician Al Burian. The zine, currently at issue 16 as of May 2012, contains stories from his childhood, his life after college, and his countless misadventures traveling across the country and abroad. Al Burian began distributing the zine in the mid-nineties in the DIY punk scene. The first 9 issues were collectively republished as a book (also titled Burn Collector) in March 2000, and later republished by PM Press in 2011. Issues 10-13 were compiled in a book titled Natural Disasters. Issue 14 was published as a small paperback book, whereas issue 15 returned to a simpler, self-photocopied look; both issues were published by Microcosm Publishing.
