= All That's Left =

Single by Thrice

from the album The Artist in the Ambulance
- B-side: "Stare at the Sun (Acoustic), Eclipse, Motion Without Meaning"
- Released: June 17, 2003
- Recorded: February 2003
- Genre: Post-hardcore; alternative rock
- Label: Island
- Songwriter: Thrice
- Producer: Brian McTernan

Thrice singles chronology
"All That's Left" (2003)	"Under a Killing Moon" (2003)

"All That's Left" is a single by Thrice from the album The Artist in the Ambulance. "All That's Left" was released to radio on June 17, 2003 as the lead single. Both a single and enhanced CD version were released for the song in 2003. The song is featured on the soundtrack for Madden NFL 04.

== Background ==
Island Records asked the band to finish recording "All That's Left" before the rest of the album so that it could be released as the lead single. Frontman Dustin Kensrue said that the process was "stressful" and that it was the only time that the band had done something like that. In 2024, he noted how the label might not have made the best decision because the title track ended up becoming the most-listened to song from the album 20 years later.

Kensrue said that the band wanted the title track to be the second single from the album, but that a "certain program director at a certain radio station" promised Thrice that if they released "Stare at the Sun" as the second single instead, the station would "play the hell out of it", a promise which was broken.

== Track listing ==
All That's Left Single

1. "All That's Left [Radio Edit]" - 3:10

All That's Left Enhanced CD

1. "All That's Left [Radio Edit]" - 3:12
2. "Stare at the Sun [Acoustic]" - 3:42
3. "Motion Without Meaning" - 1:54
4. "All That's Left [CD-ROM Video]" - 3:09

Note: "Motion Without Meaning" was later renamed "Motion Isn't Meaning".

== Charts ==
Chart (2003)	Peak position
UK Singles (Official Charts)	69
UK Rock & Metal (Official Charts)	12
US Alternative Airplay (Billboard)	24
US Mainstream Rock (Billboard)	36
