= Sub City Records =

Record label

Sub City Records is a record label which was created by Louis Posen and Hopeless Records to raise funding and awareness for non-profit organizations. Sub City has been active since 1999, and has now over 30 releases.

The label has donated over $2 million to more than 50 nonprofit organizations. Proceeds are generated by Sub City's releases and the label's annual Take Action Tour.

== Artists ==
- Against All Authority
- Kaddisfly
- Mike Park

== Former Artists ==
- Fifteen/Jeff Ott
- Funeral Oration
- Mêlée (Moved to Warner Bros. Records)
- Scared of Chaka
- Thrice
- The Weakerthans

== See also ==
- List of record labels
