= To Be Everywhere Is to Be Nowhere =

Studio album by Thrice
- Released: May 27, 2016
- Studios: Palmquist Studios (Los Angeles, California)
- Genres: Post-hardcore; hard rock; grunge
- Length: 41:36
- Label: Vagrant
- Producer: Eric Palmquist

Thrice chronology
| Anthology (2012) | To Be Everywhere Is to Be Nowhere (2016) | Palms (2018) |

Singles from To Be Everywhere Is to Be Nowhere
- 1. "Black Honey" Released: April 27, 2016; 2. "Hurricane" Released: April 25, 2017

To Be Everywhere Is to Be Nowhere is the ninth studio album by American rock band Thrice. The album was released on May 27, 2016, through Vagrant Records. To Be Everywhere Is to Be Nowhere is Thrice's first release after a four-year hiatus that lasted from mid-2012 to mid-2015, and the band's first album of original material in five years since 2011's Major/Minor. During the hiatus, most of the band members continued performing music and pursued other interests, which included moving to other cities or states with their new families.

After reuniting and performing sporadic festival dates in 2015, Thrice announced the band's intention to release a new album the following year. Because of the distance between the members' new homes, the demos for To Be Everywhere Is to Be Nowhere were written, recorded, shared and worked on digitally using software programs that were not as prevalent before they went on hiatus. Produced by Eric Palmquist, the resulting recording was a hard rock, post-hardcore and grunge album that features songs with more explicitly politically and socially charged lyrics than those on previous Thrice albums.

Thrice formally announced the release of To Be Everywhere Is to Be Nowhere in March 2016 and released two singles in support of the album; "Black Honey" in May 2016 and "Hurricane" in April 2017. The album managed to reach number 15 on the Billboard 200, and received mostly positive reviews from critics; some were moved by the lyrical aspects, while many others praised the album's sonic diversity, especially the heavier parts. Because most members of Thrice settled down and started families during their hiatus, the band decided to be more selective about its touring schedules after reforming so the members could spend more time at home.

== Background ==
Thrice decided to go on an indefinite hiatus in 2012 following the supporting tours of their 2011 eighth studio album, Major/Minor. In the announcement of the band's split, the members cited several reasons for the break including an intense 13-year touring and writing schedule, the members' evolving music tastes and the inability to spend enough time with their families. Several band members experienced the death of a family member surrounding the production and release of Major/Minor. Vocalist and guitarist Dustin Kensrue assured fans Thrice would return one day. He said: "Thrice is not breaking up. If nothing has broken us up by now, I doubt anything ever could. However, we will be taking a break from being a full-time band, and the upcoming tour in the Spring will be the last one for the foreseeable future." Released months after the hiatus officially began in 2012, the 24-song live album Anthology captured Thrice's final tour.

It was really hard being away from the family and touring as much as we were. We just decided, 'Let's just take a break for a bit, let life happen and we'll come back to it when we feel ready.'

— Teppei Teranishi in 2016 on the band's hiatus

During their hiatus, most members of Thrice still performed music through various projects. Kensrue carried on as a worship director at Mars Hill Church until 2014, when he left amid controversies surrounding evangelical Christian Mark Driscoll. He continued his solo music career and released studio albums The Water & the Blood (2013) and Carry the Fire (2015) in his own name. Kensrue also formed a new band called The Modern Post that performed worship music and released the EPs Grace Alone (2012) and Lowborn King (2014) through Mars Hill Church's label, Mars Hill Music. Drummer Riley Breckenridge formed a grindcore and baseball-themed band called Puig Destroyer, an amalgamation of the names of grindcore band Pig Destroyer and baseball player Yasiel Puig. Puig Destroyer released two EPs—Puig Destroyer (2013) and Wait for Spring (2013)—and a full-length studio album Puig Destroyer (2014). He also served as a touring drum technician for Jimmy Eat World and Weezer. Bassist Eddie Breckenridge was briefly a member of Tom DeLonge's Angels & Airwaves in 2014 and also worked as a touring member of 90s emo band Knapsack during its 2013–2015 reunion shows. Teppei Teranishi became interested in leather crafting and moved from California to Vashon, Washington, where he later opened his own store, Teranishi Studio, to sell his products over the course of five years. He said he only picked up his guitar to play "Itsy Bitsy Spider" for his children during the hiatus.

In December 2014, Thrice announced it would reform the following year. Kensrue was at a performance by Brand New in Seattle with guitarist Teppei Teranishi when he realized he wanted to get Thrice back together. He texted his former bandmates and said (roughly): "I miss you, I miss making music with you and I hope that we can do it again". Riley Breckenridge said the text message quickly "snowballed" into conversations about performing shows and writing new music. Kensrue said the hiatus was important because the band members needed time off and to form a new appreciation for Thrice. He said: "The break was a good thing, a really good thing ... I think it was healthy, as much as I think it was hard for everyone in the band in different ways at the time we took the break, but coming back, I also think we're all grateful for it." The band has said that with their reunion, Thrice would take a more structured approach to writing and touring so they would not be away from their families and other responsibilities for extended periods of time. In December 2015, after performing festival dates throughout most of the year, Thrice formally announced it would release a new album in 2016.

== Writing and recording ==
The writing process for To Be Everywhere Is to Be Nowhere lasted about six months, though most Thrice members continued songwriting for the band during the hiatus. For the majority of Thrice's career, all of the band members lived within close proximity of each other in California but during the hiatus, several members moved out of state or to other cities. To Be Everywhere Is to Be Nowhere is the first album written primarily through file sharing ideas and demo recordings shared over the Internet. Though the band made an effort to write material while they were together at festival dates in 2015, most of the album was created virtually. They used programs such as Logic Studio for building songs, Dropbox for sharing files and Asana for facilitating and logging communication. The members of Thrice had varying opinions of the effectiveness of this new method. Riley Breckenridge, who previously composed music virtually with Puig Destroyer, said he found the situation to be challenging and would have preferred to jam together in person as a band. He said, "I think it was difficult to not have a lot of time to jam stuff out but I think it also forced us to be more creative in the studio once we all got together and actually started recording the songs. It was an exciting way to write a record because it was a new way to write, but it was also daunting because it was unfamiliar." Kensrue said he felt the extra time and distance allowed each member to act more creatively and ultimately greatly benefited the finished album. The members of Thrice also had to write around their families schedules—at the time of recording, Kensrue and Teranishi both had three children and Riley Breckenridge's first child had just been born.

During the writing process, Thrice scrapped a few ideas for the album. Kensrue originally wanted to write "a more stringent concept album" but abandoned the idea because the album was coming together in favor of looser sociopolitical themes throughout. Eddie Breckenridge hoped the comeback album would be significantly heavier, feature more energy and "smash people's faces" musically. While the album did not turn out that way, Eddie said Thrice took a lot of the "more somber" sounding demos and "brought them up a level for the album", citing the transformation of "Black Honey" from a laid-back acoustic song to a "big rock song" as one example.

To Be Everywhere Is to Be Nowhere was produced by Eric Palmquist (Mutemath, Dot Hacker, Eyes Set to Kill). Contrasting the more intense production schedules of previous albums when the band would spend "eight hours a day, every day, in the studio", Thrice recorded music in sessions on alternate days to prevent burnout and keep the engineering process fun. In addition to the flexible recording schedule, the demos Thrice took into the studio were described as being "a lot more open-ended" than the demos for Beggars and Major/Minor. This allowed the band members to experiment with working versions of the songs before officially recording them. Riley Breckenridge described the process, stating: "It was a lot more like a conversation and a creative experience than it was just capturing better versions of the final demos we had".

== Music and lyrics ==
The members of Thrice have stated that while elements or parts of To Be Everywhere Is to Be Nowhere might resemble other albums in their discography, the new album has a unique sound. Riley Breckenridge said:

I think there is a different sound but I also think that there is a healthy nod to some of our back catalog in a lot of the music. There's stuff on this record that wouldn't necessarily feel out of place on The Artist in the Ambulance, or Vheissu or wouldn't have felt out of place if it was part of The Alchemy Index or Beggars, or Major/Minor. But at the same time it's also pushing that kind of stuff forward.

Kensrue said, "I don't know that this new record sounds like a huge jump. It's very different from Major/Minor or Beggars, but I feel like it's not this giant move." Lars Gotrich of NPR noted that the promotional track "Black Honey" musically resembles "late-period Cave In" and compared Kensrue's vocals to the "soulful rasp of Soundgarden's Chris Cornell". The track "Blood On the Sand" was inspired by the work of Nirvana. To Be Everywhere Is to Be Nowhere was noted for sounding heavier than Thrice's previous few albums. Riley Breckenridge said he appreciated instances in which more aggressive sounds were incorporated in an emotionally impacting and dynamic way, drawing inspiration from bands he felt achieved this, including Cave In, Torche, Cult of Luna and O'Brother. Thrice also made an effort to make a "seamless record from track to track", which they achieved by having "an outro [that] will bleed into an intro for another song or there's a segue". Critics have described the album's genre as hard rock, post-hardcore and grunge.

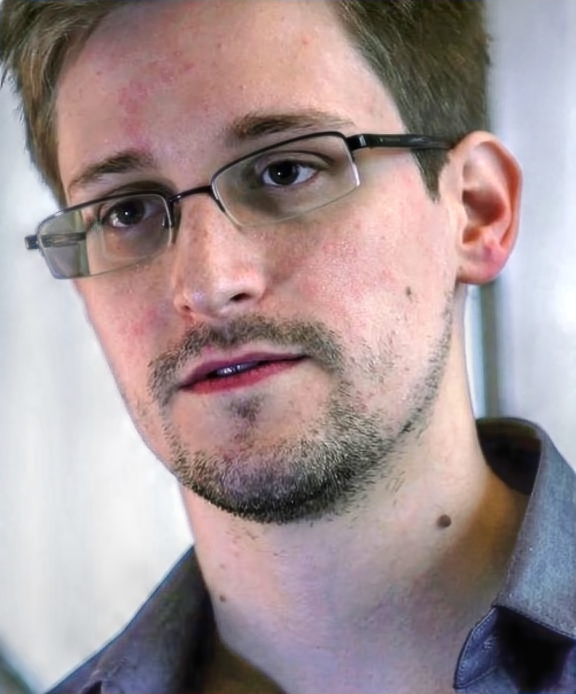
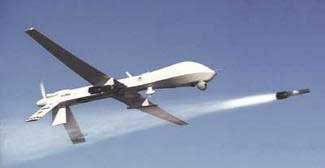
The album is noted for its politically and socially themed lyrics, including "Whistleblower" and "Death from Above," which are about Edward Snowden (top) and drone strikes (Predator shown on the bottom), respectively.

Whereas the lyrics of previous Thrice albums have focused on literary, biblical and occasionally science-fiction themes, most of the songs on To Be Everywhere Is to Be Nowhere touch on political, cultural and social themes. Speaking about the album's lyrics, Kensrue said, "I would definitely say that we've drawn a lot of our influence from the current state of politics, but I also like to personalize things when I write, and I've always written that way". "Blood On the Sand", whose the opening line is "We wave our flags, we swallow fear like medicine / We kiss the hands of profiteers and their congressmen", was described as having "much more hard-hitting political dialogue". Kensrue said in another interview, "I've usually tried to stay out of being explicitly political in the sense of being partisan, at least in my art. I really hate the party system and think it's a huge part of a lot of the problems we have ... I try not to go to the party lines but to just talk about actual social issues that have political ramifications." "Black Honey" includes imagery of a man swatting at bees to collect their honey while becoming confused when they sting him, which Kensrue said "seemed a fitting metaphor for much of U.S. foreign policy". "Whistleblower" is about Edward Snowden, who leaked NSA documents proving that the government was spying on American citizens without warrant. "Death from Above" was written from the perspective of an unmanned combat aerial vehicle (drone) pilot. Kensrue said about half the tracks on To Be Everywhere Is to Be Nowhere follow this explicitly political theme while the rest were described as more broadly focused and touching on social or cultural concepts.

The album's title of the album is derived from a quotation from Epistulae morales ad Lucilium (Letters from a Stoic) by the Roman philosopher and statesman Seneca the Younger (4 BC – AD 65). Thrice also named the interlude track "Seneca" after the philosopher. Though it was written thousands of years ago, Thrice found meaning in the quotation in a contemporary setting; Kensrue stated, "it seems like it was written for our time right now". He added; "We have so many more distractions and things at our fingertips. Ways for us to disengage from the world around us. [To Be Everywhere Is to Be Nowhere] became the background noise we were breathing as we were writing the album." Riley Breckenridge said that in today's society with smartphones, Google, the Internet and easy access to a massive wealth of knowledge, it is hard to focus on the present. To him, the Seneca quotation means "focusing more on the importance of being present in the moment that you're in instead of being everywhere all at once". In the text from which the album's title was quoted, Seneca gives advice to Lucilius Junior and suggests it is better for one to sharpen one's focus on what is important than to divide one's attention between many things.

== Marketing and promotion ==
Prior to the release of To Be Everywhere Is to Be Nowhere, Thrice promoted the album by streaming two tracks on the Internet. The first, "Blood on the Sand," became available online on March 24, 2016. Kensrue said choosing the debut track to promote an album is always difficult because of the guesswork involved. He ultimately selected this track because; "It has an immediacy to it, the pacing—I really like the song in general, it's pretty strong melodically, energetically". The release of "Blood on the Sand" was followed by that of "Black Honey" a month later on April 27; it was one of the first tracks Thrice wrote after reuniting. The week of the album's release, Thrice posted "Death from Above" online for streaming. A music video for "Black Honey" directed by Y2K was released on May 17. The video depicts a boy with glowing eyes being driven through countryside by various figures, including members of Thrice. The car pulls over by an orchard and a flash of light emanates from the boy, leaving the trees covered in a dark, liquid-like substance. The album itself was released on May 27.

With the announcement of the end of the band's hiatus, the members of Thrice said their tour in support of future albums starting with To Be Everywhere Is to Be Nowhere would be significantly reduced from their more rigorously scheduled earlier tours to allow them to spend more time with their families and working on other projects. Riley Breckenridge said, "when we were in The Artist in the Ambulance [2003] or Vheissu [2005] days we'd be on tour for about 8 to 10 months out of the year [but for upcoming tours] I think we're going to scale it back, and I believe the longest that we'll be out for is three weeks to a month. Then we're going to make sure that we have a decent gap where we can be at home and take care of stuff on the homefront." Thrice's first tour for To Be Everywhere Is to Be Nowhere took place in June 2016 in North America with support from La Dispute and Gates, which was followed by an August 2016 European tour.

== Reception ==
Professional ratings
Aggregate scores
| Source | Rating |
|---|---|
| Metacritic | 78/100 |
Review scores
| Source | Rating |
| Allmusic | 3.5/5 stars |
| Alternative Press | 4/5 stars |
| Chorus.fm | (positive) |
| Consequence of Sound | C− |
| DIY | 4/5 stars |
| Kerrang! | 4/5 stars |
| Punknews.org | 4.5/5 stars |
| Rock Sound | 8/10 |
| Sputnikmusic | 4.9/5 |

To Be Everywhere Is to Be Nowhere charted in numerous countries around the world. It performed best in North America, peaking at number 15 on the American Billboard 200 and at number 20 on its Canadian component. The record received generally positive reviews from critics. At Metacritic, which assigns a normalized rating out of 100 to reviews from mainstream publications, the album received an average score of 78 based on eight reviews, indicating a generally favorable reception.

Allmusic's Neil Z. Yeung praised the album's mature rock sound, likening the album to Thrice's previous albums Vheissu (2005), Beggars (2009) and Major/Minor (2011). He wrote in his summary; "For a band that has consistently switched up their direction with each successive album, the biggest surprise is not that To Be Everywhere Is to Be Nowhere once again manages to add fresh ideas to the Thrice catalog, but that a band 17 years into their career still has new directions to travel". Alternative Press' Jonah Bayer said the music is "heavy enough to mosh to yet cerebral enough to reveal more of itself through each subsequent listen", highlighting the sequence between the heavy tenth track "Whistleblower" and the softer eleventh track "Salt and Shadow" as a prime example of stylistic contrast on the record. He described the album as "a small triumph not just in its existence but also in its execution" in reference to the band's reunion.

Chorus.fm reviewer Aaron Mook complimented the fluidity in stylistic shifts throughout the album, concluding, "Simply put, To Be Everywhere is To Be Nowhere is one of the best 'rock' records of 2016 and an ambitious entry into Thrice’s already stunning catalog". Dan Caffrey of Consequence of Sound was less enthused with the album. Complaining that the album lacked energy, he wrote, "Vheissu may not have had the snarl or speed-freak time signatures of The Illusion of Safety, but it more than made up for that with its epic scope and genre experimentation. But [Thrice's] ninth album, To Be Everywhere Is To Be Nowhere, has neither the charge nor the depth of anything that came before it." He did, however, praise the first releases from the album, "Blood on the Sand" and "Black Honey". Although DIY's Ali Shutler called the album "weird and slanted", she also noted "a ridiculous wonder to the whole thing", citing "Black Honey" as an example. A track-by-track review of the album by Kerrang! concluded that "while [it is] not Thrice's best, [it] still soars above the competition".

Punknews.org praised the album's instrumentation, likening the sounds of "Hurricane" to "a heavier Kings of Leon" and "The Window" to the work of Radiohead, while making lyrical comparisons to Rage Against the Machine on "Wake Up" and "Black Honey". They summarized the record as "Raw but polished. Dramatic but with purpose." Tomas Doyle at Rock Sound praised the depth and production of the album's songs, especially those of "Stay With Me" and "Black Honey". Doyle also appreciated the heaviness of "Whistleblower", which he described as "hammering instrumental brilliance with Dustin Kensrue’s glass-on-asphalt voice to mesmeric effect". Ben K. of Sputnikmusic gave the album a near-perfect score of 4.9/5. While he was particularly impressed by the lyrical themes throughout the album, he also commented, "Everybody sounds great here, with a particularly forceful energy from Riley Breckenridge’s drums every bit as critical to the dynamic ups and downs as Kensrue’s vocal delivery". The website listed To Be Everywhere Is to Be Nowhere as the second best album of 2016, trailing behind David Bowie's Blackstar.

== Track listing ==
All lyrics are written by Dustin Kensrue; all music is composed by Eddie Breckenridge, Riley Breckenridge, Dustin Kensrue, and Teppei Teranishi.

| No. | Title | Length |
|---|---|---|
| 1. | "Hurricane" | 4:44 |
| 2. | "Blood on the Sand" | 2:50 |
| 3. | "The Window" | 3:34 |
| 4. | "Wake Up" | 4:07 |
| 5. | "The Long Defeat" | 4:11 |
| 6. | "Seneca" | 1:00 |
| 7. | "Black Honey" | 3:59 |
| 8. | "Stay with Me" | 4:00 |
| 9. | "Death from Above" | 3:37 |
| 10. | "Whistleblower" | 3:26 |
| 11. | "Salt and Shadow" | 6:08 |

== Personnel ==
To Be Everywhere Is to Be Nowhere adapted from CD liner notes.

=== Thrice ===
- Eddie Breckenridge
- Riley Breckenridge
- Dustin Kensrue
- Teppei Teranishi

=== Production ===
- Steven Aguilar – engineering
- Ted Jensen – mastering at Sterling Sound, NYC
- Ian MacGregor – engineering
- Mike Orr – guitar tech
- Eric Palmquist – production, engineering and mixing at Palmquist Studios
- Colin "Gravy" Strahm – drum tech

=== Artwork ===
- Christopher Royal King (This Will Destroy You) – art direction, design and artwork

== Charts ==
| Chart (2016) | Peak position |
|---|---|
| Australian Albums (ARIA) | 57 |
| Austrian Albums (Ö3 Austria) | 33 |
| Belgian Albums (Ultratop Flanders) | 148 |
| Canadian Albums (Billboard) | 20 |
| German Albums (Offizielle Top 100) | 35 |
| Swiss Albums (Schweizer Hitparade) | 35 |
| UK Albums (Official Charts) | 62 |
| US Billboard 200 | 15 |
| US Vinyl Albums (Billboard) | 1 |
