= Black Honey (song) =

Single by Thrice

from the album To Be Everywhere Is to Be Nowhere
- Released: April 27, 2016
- Recorded: 2015
- Studio: Palmquist Studios
- Genre: Post-hardcore; alternative rock
- Length: 3:49
- Label: Vagrant
- Songwriter(s): Eddie Breckenridge; Riley Breckenridge; Dustin Kensrue; Teppei Teranishi
- Producer(s): Eric Palmquist

Thrice singles chronology
"Blood on the Sand" (2016)	"Black Honey" (2016)	"Hurricane" (2017)

"Black Honey" is a song by American rock band Thrice. The song was released on April 27, 2016 as the second single from their ninth studio album, To Be Everywhere Is to Be Nowhere. It was the first single the band released following their hiatus in 2012 and subsequent reunion in 2015. The political track uses the imagery of a man swatting at a beehive in search of honey as a metaphor for the creation of the Islamic State of Iraq and the Levant as a consequence of United States involvement in the Middle East, using the titular "black honey" as a euphemism for oil. The song was a large comeback hit for the band, charting at No. 11 on the Billboard Mainstream Rock chart, their highest-charting single to date and their first charting single since "Image of the Invisible" in 2005.

== Background and composition ==
The American post-hardcore band Thrice went on hiatus in 2012, following a spring tour to support their 2011 album Major/Minor. During their break, drummer Riley Breckenridge performed with grindcore act Puig Destroyer, while bassist Eddie Breckenridge joined the alternative rock band Angels & Airwaves. Reunion rumors began during a March 2014 Reddit AMA session, when lead vocalist Dustin Kensrue said that future touring was "very, very likely," and was optimistic that Thrice would record more music. That December, the band announced their reunion by uploading an image reading "Thrice 2015" to their official website. Lead guitarist Teppei Teranishi later revealed that he and Kensrue were inspired to reunite the band after attending a Brand New concert in Seattle together, and an "I miss you" text quickly "snowballed" into conversations about performing and writing new music.

"Black Honey" was one of the first songs the band wrote upon reuniting. Teranishi originally wrote the main riff on an acoustic guitar during the band's hiatus, before turning it into a "big rock song." The lyrics were inspired by an image that "popped into" Kensrue's head, depicting "someone continually swatting at a swarm of bees to get their honey, but somehow not understanding why they would sting back in return," adding that the image "seemed a fitting metaphor for much of U.S. foreign policy." Kensrue later expanded on the metaphor, "We've built problem on problem on problem, and now we find ourselves with ISIS and people are like—maybe we’ll do more of the same! It hasn’t worked yet: so maybe we need more of holistic approach to what we’re doing."

== Release and promotion ==
"Black Honey" was the second single from Thrice's return album, To Be Everywhere Is to Be Nowhere. The first, "Blood on the Sand," was released on March 24, 2016. "Black Honey" premiered via NPR Music a month later, on April 27, and was subsequently released to alternative rock and active rock radio formats on May 17. It had a strong showing on rock radio upon its release, spending 32 weeks on the Billboard Mainstream Rock chart, and peaking at #11 on November 5. The song also spent 19 weeks on the Hot Rock & Alternative Songs chart, peaking at #37 on January 7, 2017; and 20 weeks on the Rock & Alternative Airplay chart, peaking at #31 on November 19, 2016. Black Honey was the first Thrice song to chart since "Image of the Invisible" in 2005.

"Black Honey" was featured as a song to promote the "Money in the Bank" (MITB) Pay-Per-View event for World Wrestling Entertainment on June 19, 2016.

=== Live performances ===
As part of a promotion for their new album, Thrice released a session video for "Black Honey" on September 19, 2016. Kensrue and Teranishi followed this with a December 2016 acoustic rendition of the song, played for Alternative Press's APTV sessions. In June 2017, South African hard rock band Seether performed a live cover of the song for SiriusXM.

== Reception ==
"Black Honey" debuted to a largely positive critical reception, with NPR's Lars Gotrich labeling it "a gloomy and propulsive piece of heavy drama," comparing it to Cave In, and Kensrue's voice to that of Soundgarden's Chris Cornell. Chris Coplan of VultureHound referred to the song as a "grand, swelling rock ballad," while Emily Maxwell American Songwriter described it as "an eerie, raw track about trying to do the things you love in the face of negativity." The political message of the song has drawn reference to previous Thrice releases, such as "The Sky is Falling" from The Alchemy Index Vols. III & IV (2007), and "Death From Above" and "Blood on the Sand" from To Be Everywhere Is to Be Nowhere.

Many album reviews of To Be Everywhere Is to Be Nowhere singled out "Black Honey" as particularly worthy of praise. In an overall negative review of To Be Everywhere Is to Be Nowhere, Dan Caffrey of Consequence of Sound referred to "Black Honey" "the sole song where Kensrue manages to be unconventional in his metaphor." Jonah Bayer of Alternative Press referred to the track as the album's strongest, and drew comparisons to a "more technical version" of Alice In Chains. Ali Shutler of DIY Mag praised the track's "hypnotic lure," while Tomas Doyle of Rock Sound called the production "gorgeous."

== Music video ==
The music video for "Black Honey" was released on May 17, 2016. Directed by Y2K, a media group consisting of Jason Lester and Severiano Ramirez, and produced by Lester, the video depicts a boy (played by Jesse James Baldwin) sitting in the passenger seat of a car on a road trip. Various people are seen driving the car, including the members of Thrice and the boy's mother (played by Jennifer Lee Laks). The boy steps out of the car and into a field, where he is possessed by the sun and evaporates. Black honey is seen dripping from the leaves and fruits. With over 51 million views, it is Thrice's most viewed music video.

== Charts ==
Chart (2017)	Peak position
US Mainstream Rock (Billboard)	11
US Hot Rock & Alternative Songs (Billboard)	37
US Rock & Alternative Airplay (Billboard)	31
