= List of people from Irvine, California =

This is a list of notable past and present residents of the U.S. city of Irvine, California, and its surrounding metropolitan area. For people whose only connection with the city is attending the University of California, Irvine, see: List of University of California, Irvine people.

== Athletics ==
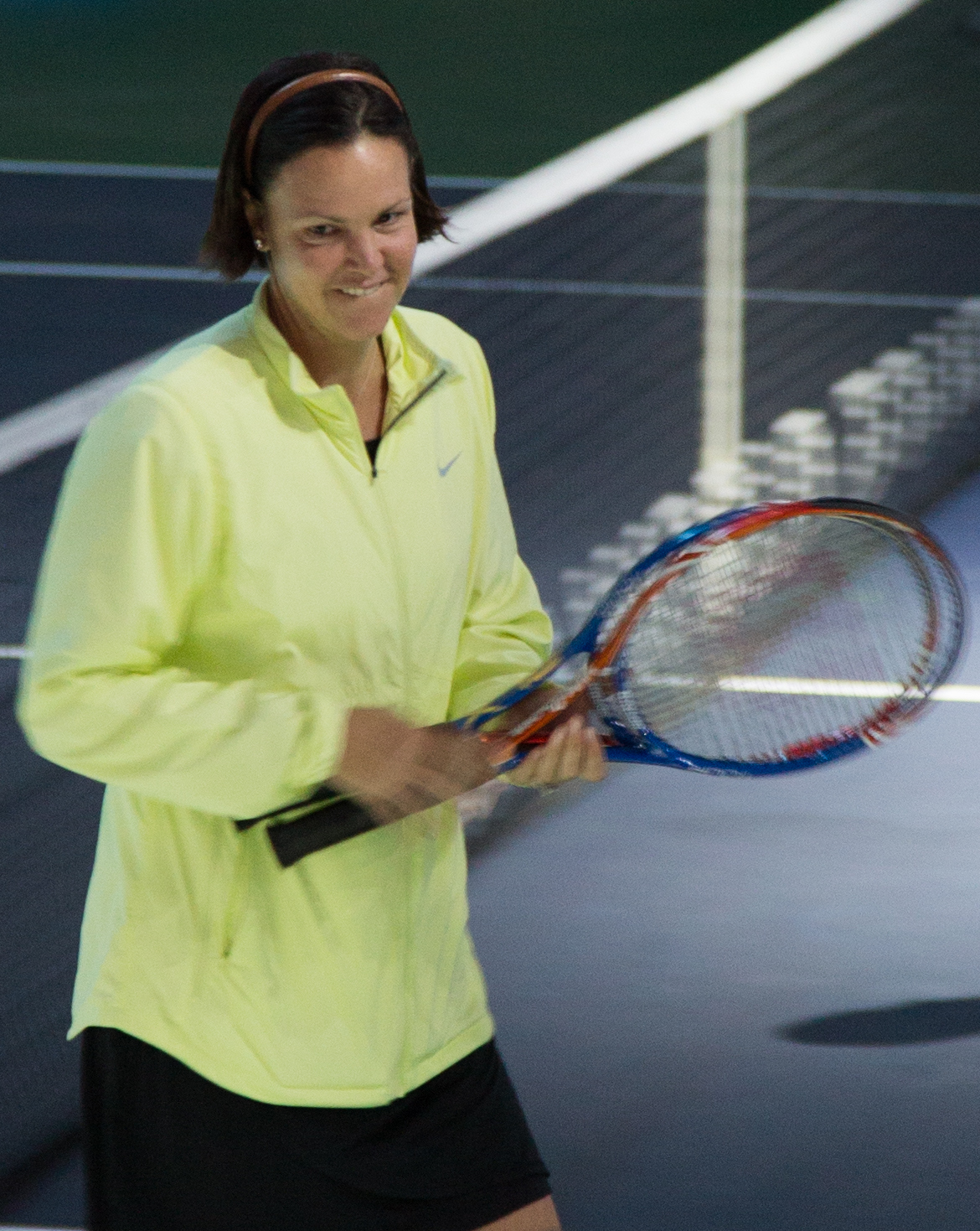
Lindsay Davenport

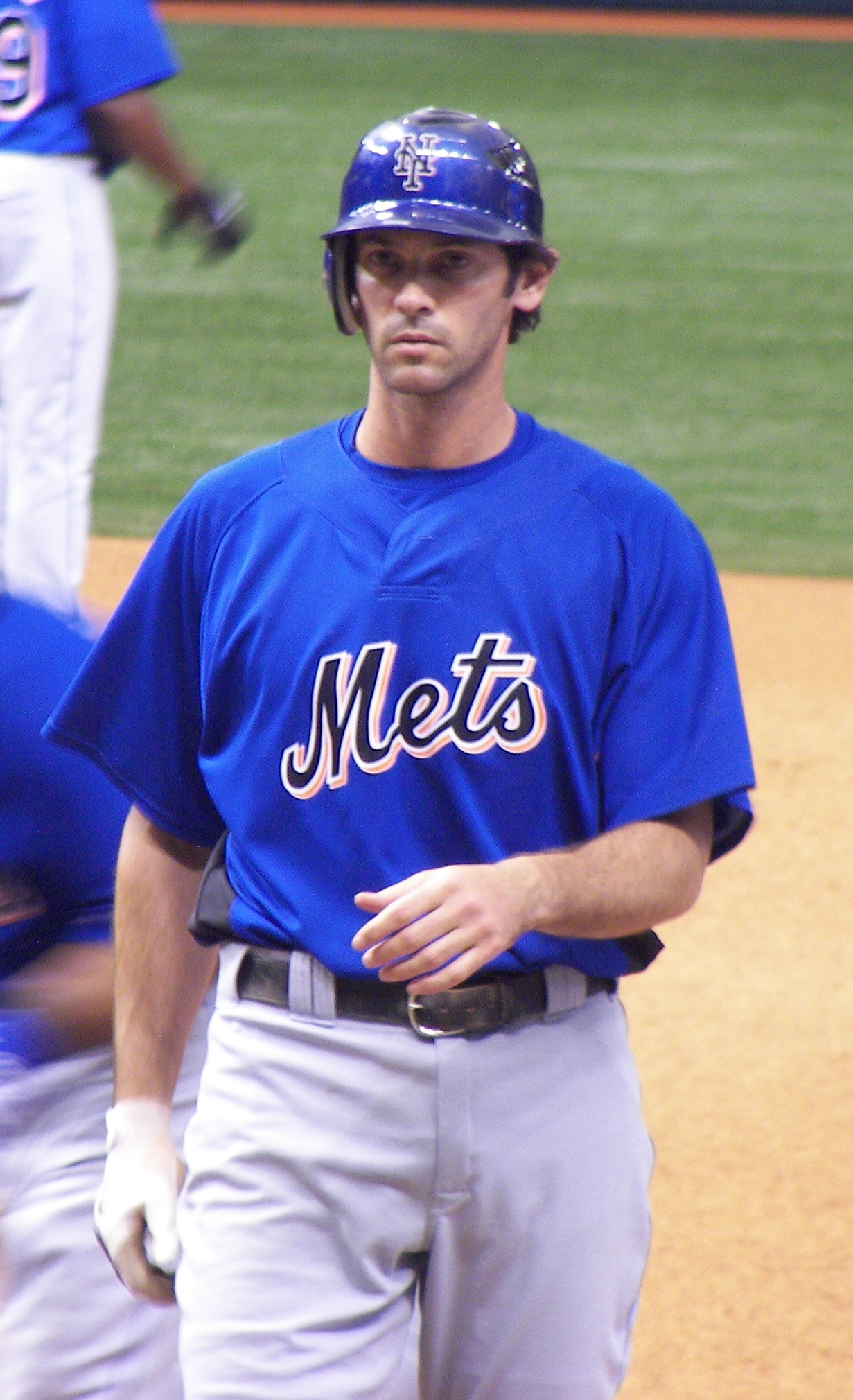
Shawn Green

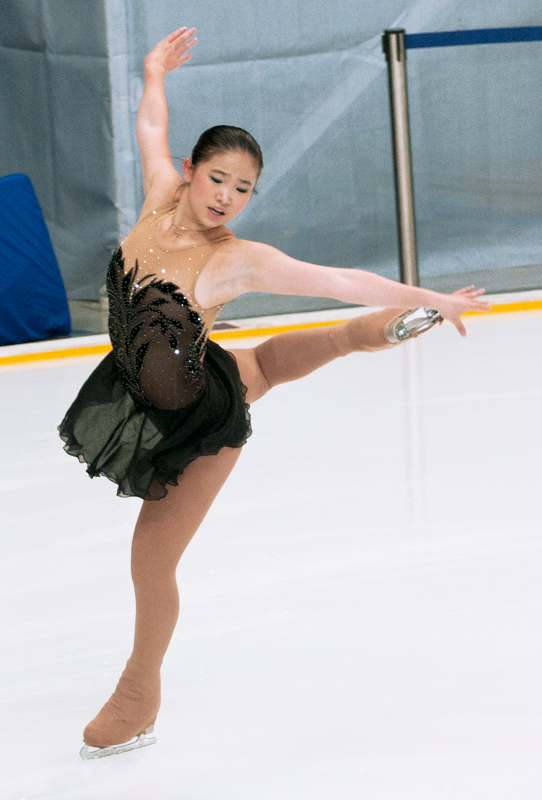
Caroline Zhang

- Garret Anderson – Major League Baseball player
- Garrett Atkins – Major League Baseball player
- C. David Baker – commissioner of the Arena Football League and former Irvine Council member
- Dotsie Bausch – Olympic cyclist
- Amanda Beard – Olympic swimmer
- Steve Birnbaum (born 1991) – soccer player
- Travis Brody – professional football player
- T. J. Casner (born 1994) – soccer player
- JT Daniels – quarterback for the West Virginia Mountaineers
- Lindsay Davenport – professional tennis player
- Anthony Davis – former National Football League player
- Austin Daye – National Basketball Association player
- Darren Daye – former National Basketball Association player
- Annaliese Dragan – Romanian/American rhythmic gymnast and 2024 Olympian
- Eric Ebert – professional football (soccer) player
- Jim Edmonds – Major League Baseball player
- Julie Ertel – Olympic triathlete (2008 Summer Olympics) and water polo player (2000 Summer Olympics)
- Benny Feilhaber – professional soccer player
- Vince Ferragamo – former NFL/CFL quarterback, led Los Angeles Rams to Super Bowl appearance, 1980
- Kevin Friedland (born 1981) – soccer player
- Shawn Green – former Major League Baseball player; 2-time All-Star
- Bob Hamelin – former Major League Baseball player
- Dan Haren – Major League Baseball pitcher
- Aiden Hezarkhani (born 2008) – soccer player
- Nick Hornsby (born 1995) – basketball player for Hapoel Be'er Sheva in the Israeli Basketball Premier League
- Rampage Jackson – professional mixed martial arts fighter and UFC former light-heavyweight champion
- Adam Keefe – former National Basketball Association player
- Carnell Lake – five-time NFL Pro Bowl player and UCLA Bruins assistant football coach
- Mark Langston – former Major League Baseball player
- Chris Lewis – former professional tennis player
- Jason Lezak – Olympic swimmer, four-time gold medal winner
- Chris Mandeville – former National Football League defensive back
- Michael McClune – professional tennis player
- Mark McGwire – former Major League Baseball player
- Beverly Oden – Olympic volleyball player
- Elaina Oden – Olympic volleyball player
- Kim Oden – Olympic volleyball player
- Aaron Peirsol – Olympic swimmer
- Shar Pourdanesh – former National Football League player, first Iranian-born player in NFL, starting tackle for Washington Redskins and Pittsburgh Steelers
- Chris Pronger – National Hockey League player
- Jimmy Raye – former National Football League player and offensive coordinator for the San Francisco 49ers
- Dave Romney – soccer player
- Joe Sambito – retired Major League pitcher
- Monte Scheinblum – 1992 U.S. National and world long-driving champion
- Scott Spiezio – former Major League Baseball player
- Eliot Teltscher – Top-10 tennis player
- Learner Tien – tennis player; in 2025 was the second-youngest American man to reach the fourth round at the Australian Open in the Open Era and the youngest player to do so since Rafael Nadal in 2005. In 2026 was the youngest player to reach the quarterfinals at the Australian Open since 2015, and the youngest American to reach a Grand Slam quarterfinal since 2002.
- Natasha Watley – Olympic softball player
- Zack Weiss (born 1992) – Major League Baseball player
- Caroline Zhang – figure skater

== Literature and journalism ==
- Elvira Bary – Russian-American historical fiction author, YouTube blogger
- Kevin Drum – political blogger for the Mother Jones magazine website
- Ezra Klein – Washington Post columnist, MSNBC contributor, blogger
- Tahereh Mafi – bestselling young adult fiction author
- Annalee Newitz – science and technology journalist
- Kira Peikoff – novelist, journalist, and daughter of Leonard Peikoff

== Movies, television, and other media ==
- Omid Abtahi – actor
- Eric Anderson – actor
- Jeanne Carmen – model, pin-up girl, and actress
- Justin Chon – actor
- Jack DeSena – sketch comedy actor on Nickelodeon's All That
- Will Ferrell – actor and comedian
- Jeff Garcia – actor and comedian
- Georgia Hardstark – actress, podcast, My Favorite Murder
- Hugh Hewitt – author, radio talk show host, blogger
- Ben Maller – sports radio personality
- Annie Mumolo – screenwriter actor
- Nicole Parker – comedian and actress
- Nasim Pedrad – Saturday Night Live cast member
- Jason Peoples – winner of the reality television show Average Joe (Season 1)
- Gene Polito – cinematographer and professor at USC School of Cinematic Arts
- Jim Rome – sports radio personality
- Irv Weinstein – retired television news anchor (WKBW-TV) and father of mayor Beth Krom

== Music ==
- Rebecca Black – singer/YouTuber
- Eddie Breckenridge – bassist for the post-hardcore band Thrice
- Riley Breckenridge – drummer for the post-hardcore band Thrice
- Cashis – Shady Records rapper
- Tim Commerford – Rage Against the Machine
- Zack de la Rocha – lead singer for rap metal band Rage Against the Machine
- Tom Dumont – guitarist for rock band No Doubt
- East West – Christian rapcore band
- Dustin Kensrue – vocalist and rhythm guitarist of post-hardcore band Thrice
- Martin Leung – known as the Video Game Pianist
- Geneva Lewis – violinist
- Kevin Kwan Loucks – concert pianist and arts entrepreneur
- Aubrey O'Day – singer
- Teppei Teranishi – lead guitarist of post-hardcore band Thrice
- Thrice – post-hardcore band active from 1998–Present
- Amy Yao – bassist for Riot grrrl band Emily's Sassy Lime
- Yeat – rapper
- Young the Giant – band

== Politics ==
- Dick Ackerman – politician and former California state senator
- Larry Agran – politician and Irvine Council member
- John B. T. Campbell III – politician and former U.S. congressman
- Steven Choi – politician and former Irvine mayor
- Chuck DeVore – politician and California State Assemblyman and candidate for U.S. Senate in 2010
- Ross Johnson – politician and former California State Legislator
- Sukhee Kang – former mayor of Irvine and former Irvine Council member
- Farrah N. Khan – former mayor of Irvine and former Irvine Council member
- Tammy Kim – former Irvine Council member
- Dave Min – U.S. congressman and former California state senator
- Katie Porter – former U.S. congresswoman

== Miscellaneous ==
- William E. Barber – Medal of Honor United States Marine Corps officer
- Larry C. Ford – gynecologist found to have stored deadly biological toxins (including the agents of anthrax, botulism, cholera, and typhoid) in his home and office, and C4 and machine guns in his back yard
- Steve Gibson – software engineer and security journalist
- Nam Le – professional poker player
- Leonard Peikoff – Objectivist philosopher and intellectual heir to novelist-philosopher Ayn Rand
- Daniel Shemtob
- Sudhir Alladi Venkatesh – sociologist and urban ethnographer
- Dita Von Teese – burlesque performer
