= Hurricane (Thrice song) =

Single by Thrice

from the album To Be Everywhere Is to Be Nowhere
- Released: April 25, 2017
- Recorded: 2015
- Studio: Palmquist Studios
- Genre: Post-hardcore; hard rock
- Length: 4:44
- Label: Vagrant
- Songwriter(s): Dustin Kensrue; Teppei Teranishi; Eddie Breckenridge; Riley Breckenridge
- Producer(s): Eric Palmquist

Thrice singles chronology
"Black Honey" (2016)	"Hurricane" (2017)	"The Grey" (2018)

"Hurricane" is a single by American rock band Thrice, off of their studio album To Be Everywhere Is to Be Nowhere. It peaked at number 24 on the Billboard Mainstream Rock Songs chart in August 2017.

== Background ==
A music video for the song was teased on April 3, 2017, and released on April 6. The song was the highest viewed new video in its debut week in April on Loudwire's Top 10 Video Countdown.

== Themes and composition ==
The song has been described as very ominous and doom-laden. The song opens with gentle, melodic and melancholic clean guitar notes, followed by vocals by Kensrue. The verses show a calm, soothing conversation of two lovers speaking, about how to avoid an upcoming hurricane, while the chorus erupts with large, distorted guitars and intense vocals, representing the coming of the storm. Frontman Dustin Kensrue outlined the ideas and concepts explored in the song:

Thrice being a heavier kind of band and me being a bit drawn to the bigger issues of life in general, all that gravitates a lot of times towards writing pretty weighty, heavy lyrics. [To Be Everywhere Is to Be Nowhere] was no exception – I'm listening to it with everything going on and there's just this weight and heaviness to it. 'Hurricane' is a good example of my trying to find something that fits there – the beauty and calm of the verses slamming into this huge thing, and I'm trying to find something that works with that and I end up writing something where I end up questioning why all these beautiful moments in time are always shattered by something – because that's what the music feels likes its doing."

Despite Teppei Teranishi typically being the band's lead guitarist, Kensrue both wrote and played the song's lead guitar part in the song, something attributed to the fact that he wrote the part, and because he felt it sounds better coming from his particular guitar rig and guitar pedal setup, specifically the Electro-Harmonix POG 2.

== Reception ==
Loudwire named it the ninth best hard rock song of 2017.

== Personnel ==
- Dustin Kensrue – lead vocals, rhythm guitar
- Teppei Teranishi – lead guitar, backing vocals
- Eddie Breckenridge – bass, backing vocals
- Riley Breckenridge – drums

== Charts ==
Chart (2017)	Peak position
US Mainstream Rock	24
