= Deadbolt (Thrice song) =

Song by Thrice

from the album The Illusion of Safety
- Released: February 5, 2002
- Recorded: July 2001
- Studio: Salad Days (Beltsville, Maryland)
- Genre: Post-hardcore; pop-punk
- Length: 2:24; 3:00 (with interlude)
- Label: Sub City
- Composer: Thrice
- Lyricist: Dustin Kensrue
- Producer: Brian McTernan

Music video
- "Deadbolt" on YouTube

"Deadbolt" is a song by the American rock band Thrice, featured as the fifth track on the band's 2002 studio album The Illusion of Safety. One of the band's best-known songs, "Deadbolt" is a merger of post-hardcore and pop-punk.

Upon The Illusion of Safety's release, "Deadbolt" was positively reviewed by critics, who commented on its hooks, high energy and technical riffs. It also became a "word-of-mouth hit" for the band and is a heavily requested fan favourite at the band's live performances; while a music video was produced, it was never released as a single. Despite the song's popularity, the members of Thrice generally disliked the song during their initial existence, and resisted playing it live due to the incessant demand for the song at their shows. Over time, the band warmed up to the song's popularity and since Thrice's reunion in 2015 the song has been played more often; the band have even sold t-shirts joking about the popularity of "Deadbolt" as official merchandise.

== Composition and lyrics ==
"Deadbolt" has generally been described as a post-hardcore and pop-punk song, and is written in the key of F♯ major with a common time tempo of 135 beats per minute. The song's guitars are dropped to E♭/ Drop D♭ tuning. The song, which lacks a verse–chorus–verse structure, was described by the BrooklynVegan to have call-and-response mannerisms, with Teppei Teranishi's guitar parts countering Dustin Kensrue's vocals and shifting between post-hardcore and pop-punk.

Lyrically, "Deadbolt" is metaphor-heavy and centred around betrayal, temptation and adultery, as well as references to death. The song's chorus ("And she calls from the doorway/Stolen water is sweet/So let's drink it in the darkness/If you know what I mean") contains multiple references to Proverbs 9 (below); which is meant to represent how those who don't understand the consequences of their actions will fall to temptation and suffer for it.

"Folly is an unruly woman; she is simple and knows nothing. She sits at the door of her house, on a seat at the highest point of the city, calling out to those who pass by, who go straight on their way, “Let all who are simple come to my house!” To those who have no sense she says, “Stolen water is sweet; food eaten in secret is delicious!” But little do they know that the dead are there, that her guests are deep in the realm of the dead."

After the song ends at 2:24, a piano interlude plays, leading into the album's next song, "In Years To Come".

== Music video ==
A music video for "Deadbolt" was released via the band's website on October 3, 2002. It shows the band performing the song at Chain Reaction, Anaheim, Orange County, on August 30, 2002. The band notified fans on their website ten days prior to the video shooting of the location of the venue so they could participate. The video received regular airplay on JBTV throughout late 2002.

The video was uploaded to YouTube by Hopeless Records in July 2007. As of April 2025, the video has 1.2 million views.

== Critical reception ==
In contemporary reviews of The Illusion of Safety that covered the song, "Deadbolt" was positively received by critics, with praise being directed at the hooks, technicality and energy of the song. The song was singled out as a highlight of the album by some critics; Ross of Punktastic described the song "in particular [as] possibly one of the greatest songs [they'd] heard in many years, never mind a contender for album track of 2002." AllMusic also selected the song as an album pick. However, not all reviews that covered the song were positive, such as Pitchfork, who cited the song as an example of the album's "incongruous lyrical and melodic direction".

=== Retrospective reception ===
In the years following its release, "Deadbolt" has been seen as one of Thrice's best songs and one of the greatest songs of the post-hardcore genre. Rockfreaks highlighted the song's impact on the popularity of The Illusion of Safety; "You only have to listen to "Deadbolt", which became, and remains, one of the most recognisable 'scene' songs of the decade, to be sold on the excellent guitar work, all-round tighter musicianship and the energy of Dustin's vocals." In a 20 year retrospective of the album in 2022, the BrooklynVegan called "Deadbolt" the album's "signature song", that had held up over the years since its release; "Even with all the exciting paths that Thrice would explore after this album, "Deadbolt" still holds up as one of their most remarkable songs", as well as calling the song "Crazy Train" [for emo kids]".

=== Accolades ===
Publication	Country	Accolade	Year	Rank
OC Weekly	United States	The 10 Best Thrice Songs	2016	4

== Live performances ==
"I don't think we have a negative opinion of the song itself. I mean, I still like playing it; it just became this song that people would yell out in the middle of a mellower song we were playing. (Laughs) It might be a bridge in the song that gets quiet and it's pretty intense and delicate and then you hear somebody yell, "Deadbolt!" (Laughs) So you build a resentment, but it's not the song. No, we still like that song, but it just ended up becoming a character of itself."

— Ed Breckenridge on why "Deadbolt" was omitted from the band's setlists.

"Deadbolt" became a "word-of-mouth hit" for the band and quickly became a fan favourite, with many requests for the song being shouted at the band's live performances. As a result of this, however, the bandmembers of Thrice began to expressed dislike at the song and its popularity, and at times refused to play the song live, before ultimately dropping the song (as well as the band's older material) from their setlist for a period of time, as the bandmembers got sick of hearing requests to play the song. Bassist Ed Breckenridge stated that Thrice preferred playing new songs than repeatedly playing older songs/popular songs. “It’s fun for us to play stuff that’s current to what we enjoy. Sometimes we have to dig deep to remember where we were when we wrote ‘Deadbolt’ because we’ve played it eight million times now.” He also said that while he liked "parts of the song", he did not think it was a good idea to "mix pop punk and metal" and that "Deadbolt" offered him little in terms of musical dynamics. However, performances of the song made their way onto the band's live albums Live at the House of Blues and Anthology, and the song was played during the band's final show before their hiatus in 2012.

Eventually, the band warmed up to the song and its popularity, and following the band's reunion in 2015, it began being played more often along with the band's older material. "The further you get from a song, the easier it is to let go of any weirdness of feeling like you are playing a song from another lifetime," Dustin Kensrue explained. "We used to really be bothered with people wanting us to play songs like "Deadbolt", etc. These days though we are able to take it less seriously and just have fun playing it and making people happy." "Deadbolt" was also played at one of Dustin Kensrue's solo shows in 2015.

The band and Dustin Kensrue have also sold t-shirts with the messages "Play Deadbolt" and "I've Seen Thrice Play "Deadbolt" 4000 times" as official merchandise, as a testament/joke to the song's popularity; Kensrue described the t-shirts as "our attempt to embrace the weird thing that is the perception and the requesting of that song."

According to setlist.fm, "Deadbolt" has been played 328 times by Thrice.
