= Major/Minor =

Studio album by Thrice
- Released: September 6, 2011
- Recorded: May 2011 at Red Bull Studios in Los Angeles, California and additional recording at New Grass Studios
- Genre: Alternative rock; post-hardcore; experimental rock
- Length: 49:32
- Label: Vagrant (VR685)
- Producer: Dave Schiffman

Thrice chronology
Beggars (2009)	Major/Minor (2011)	Anthology (2012)

Singles from Major/Minor
- 1. "Promises" Released: October 4, 2011

Major/Minor is the eighth studio album by American rock band Thrice. The album was released on September 6, 2011, through Vagrant Records.

== Recording and production ==
Thrice entered Red Bull Studios in early May 2011 with producer Dave Schiffman. The group had previously worked with Schiffman on 2005's Vheissu as an audio engineer, and on 2009's Beggars as a mixer. Thrice also previously used Red Bull Studios to record their acoustic live EP The MySpace Transmissions in 2007. When Thrice presented Schiffman with the demos they had been working on, his initial reaction was that the group was trying to make a grunge album. According to vocalist Dustin Kensrue, this was not their intention, and the finished product after production sounded "kind of bigger and meaner than the demos." Both musically and production-wise, the group's previous album Beggars was a "stripped-down" record, and Thrice wanted Major/Minor to sound "bigger and in-your-face" without sounding "smashed and oversaturated." Kensrue also noted that Schiffman joined the album process later than a producer normally would to help record an album, and that his input was minimal. He said:

We had him come down to our practice space when all the songs were kind of being played and [he] just kind of listened through and talked about them and made a couple changes based on little things said here or there, but it was really minimal in that regard. He was mostly just bringing his experience as an engineer and mixer, just knowing how to get the sounds nailed down. We're really comfortable with him.

— Dustin Kensrue, interview with Alternative Press

After the recording for Major/Minor had been completed, Thrice returned to their home studio to record "two or three" additional tracks to be used as B-sides. The home studio was also used to record Thrice's 2007/2008 albums The Alchemy Index Vols. I & II and The Alchemy Index Vols. III & IV, and Beggars. The album cover art resembles the Shroud of Turin depicting Jesus Christ's profile.

== Release and promotion ==
Major/Minor was initially released in a double LP vinyl record format on September 6, 2011, through Vagrant Records. The gatefold vinyl edition came with additional liner notes from the band members and the first pressing was limited to 4,000 copies. Two weeks later, on September 20 in the US and September 19 in the UK, Major/Minor was released in CD and digital download formats. Pre-orders for the album received an instant download of an acoustic version of "Anthology". The iTunes version of Major/Minor comes with an acoustic version of "Yellow Belly," and pre-orders through the store placed before the official release date exclusively received an acoustic version of "Promises."

In July 2011, Thrice offered a free download of the opening track "Yellow Belly" through the website ChinaShop. The rush of traffic to the website caused the site to crash, and the song was subsequently uploaded to SoundCloud. "Yellow Belly" was previously debuted live at The Bamboozle festival in April 2011. In August 2011, an acoustic version of "Anthology," and a lyric video for "Promises" were posted online. Beginning on September 7 and lasting until the day of the digital/CD release, Thrice posted one new song from Major/Minor each weekday for online streaming. "Promises" impacted radio on October 4, 2011.

=== Supporting tours ===
Thrice's first headlining tour in support of Major/Minor ran from September 30 to November 11, 2011, and featured openers La Dispute, Moving Mountains and O'Brother. Kylesa was originally intended to be an opener for this tour, but announced they would not be able to perform due to an illness in the family several months before the tour began.

== Reception ==
=== Critical response ===
Professional ratings
Aggregate scores
Source	Rating
Metacritic	82/100
Review scores
Source	Rating
AbsolutePunk	(95%)
Alternative Press	5/5 stars
BBC Music	(favorable)
Big Cheese	4/5 stars
Blare	4.5/5 stars
IGN	9/10 stars
PopMatters	(6/10)
Punknews	4/5 stars
Rock Sound	(9/10)
Sputnikmusic	4.5/5 stars

Upon its release, Major/Minor was met with critical acclaim, earning an average score of 82 based on 10 reviews from Metacritic. In a positive review, Raziq Rauf of BBC Music praised the production of the album, stating that "there’s a simplicity to the music and songs that allows the listener to enjoy them at a very elemental level." With a four out of five rating, Punknews praised the grunge influence of the album, comparing their sound to "an authentic 1990s Pearl Jam/Soundgarden creation." IGN labeled the album as "one of the strongest rock efforts of the year," with reviewer Chris Grischow praising Kensrue's vocals on "Yellow Belly", "Blinded", "Promises", "Cataract" and "Anthology". Alex Djaferis of AbsolutePunk praised the lyrics of the album, stating it was "sheer poetry and in this day and age, such a brave and welcome change."

== Track listing ==
All music written by Eddie Breckenridge, Riley Breckenridge, Dustin Kensrue and Teppei Teranishi; all lyrics written by Kensrue.

No.	Title	Length
1.	"Yellow Belly"	3:58
2.	"Promises"	4:09
3.	"Blinded"	4:24
4.	"Cataracts"	4:03
5.	"Call It in the Air"	4:37
6.	"Treading Paper"	4:41
7.	"Blur"	3:14
8.	"Words in the Water"	6:26
9.	"Listen Through Me"	4:37
10.	"Anthology"	4:35
11.	"Disarmed"	4:49

== Personnel ==
Major/Minor album personnel adapted from vinyl liner notes.

Thrice

- Eddie Breckenridge – bass
- Riley Breckenridge – drums
- Dustin Kensrue – vocals, rhythm guitar
- Teppei Teranishi – lead guitar

Production, recording and artwork

- Jordan Butcher – art direction, design, artwork
- James Musshorn – assistant engineering
- Dave Shiffman – production, recording, mixing
- Eric Stenman – assistant engineering
- Teppei Teranishi – additional recording at New Grass Studios
- Howie Weinberg – mastering
