= Only Us =

"Only Us" is the name of several songs.

- "Only Us" (Dear Evan Hansen song), a song from the musical Dear Evan Hansen
- "Only Us", a song from the album Palms by the hard rock band Thrice
- "Only Us", a song from the album Golden Hour by house DJ Kygo
