= Anthology (Thrice album) =

Live album by Thrice
- Released: October 30, 2012
- Recorded: May–June 2012
- Genre: Post-hardcore; alternative rock; experimental rock; art rock
- Length: 103:05
- Label: Staple Records / Workhorse Music Group

Thrice chronology
Major/Minor (2011)	Anthology (2012)	To Be Everywhere Is to Be Nowhere (2016)

Anthology is the second live album by Thrice, recorded during the band's farewell tour in May and June 2012. The album was released on October 30, 2012 on two CDs, and as a quadruple 180 gram LP box set limited to 3000 copies. The album consists of 24 of the 25 most-played songs on the tour, and features tracks from 2001's Identity Crisis through 2011's Major/Minor.

The cover art for the album is an old map of the highways and major streets from the band's home region of Orange County, CA including parts of Irvine, North Tustin, Orange, Santa Ana, and Tustin.

== Track listing ==
No.	Title	Original album	Length
1.	"Yellow Belly"	Major/Minor	4:38
2.	"Image of the Invisible"	Vheissu	4:06
3.	"The Artist in the Ambulance"	The Artist in the Ambulance	3:31
4.	"Kill Me Quickly"	The Illusion of Safety	2:58
5.	"Under a Killing Moon"	The Artist in the Ambulance	2:44
6.	"Silhouette"	The Artist in the Ambulance	4:21
7.	"In Exile"	Beggars	3:44
8.	"The Weight"	Beggars	5:16
9.	"Promises"	Major/Minor	4:53
10.	"Daedalus"	The Alchemy Index Vols. III & IV	6:15
11.	"Words in the Water"	Major/Minor	5:25
12.	"Of Dust and Nations"	Vheissu	4:38
13.	"Red Sky"	Vheissu	4:25
14.	"The Earth Will Shake"	Vheissu	5:15
15.	"The Messenger"	The Alchemy Index Vols. I & II	2:17
16.	"Digital Sea"	The Alchemy Index Vols. I & II	3:40
17.	"Stare at the Sun"	The Artist in the Ambulance	3:37
18.	"Deadbolt"	The Illusion of Safety	3:22
19.	"To Awake and Avenge the Dead"	The Illusion of Safety	4:07
20.	"Beggars"	Beggars	5:47
21.	"Come All You Weary"	The Alchemy Index Vols. III & IV	4:14
22.	"Phoenix Ignition"	Identity Crisis	3:46
23.	"T & C"	Identity Crisis	4:35
24.	"Anthology"	Major/Minor	5:31
