= Thoughts That Float on a Different Blood =

Studio album by Dustin Kensrue
- Released: March 18, 2016
- Genre: Contemporary folk music; alternative rock; indie folk; indie rock; folk rock
- Length: 39:57
- Label: Vagrant

Dustin Kensrue chronology
Carry the Fire (2015)	Thoughts That Float on a Different Blood (2016)

Thoughts That Float on a Different Blood is a cover album by Dustin Kensrue. It is the fifth album released by Kensrue, as well as his first live album. Vagrant Records released the album on March 18, 2016. The album was recorded over two shows at the Constellation Room in Santa Ana, California in December 2015. A related EP, More Thoughts That Float on a Different Blood, was released on November 25, 2016, for Record Store Day. It consists of two additional cover songs.

== Critical reception ==
Professional ratings
Review scores
Source	Rating
AbsolutePunk	8.8/10
Exclaim!	8/10

Indicating in an eight out of ten review from Exclaim!, Adam Feibel states, "Thoughts That Float on a Different Blood is a hauntingly beautiful record that's much more than the sum of its parts." Craig Ismaili, signaling in an 8.8 review at AbsolutePunk, writes, "Dustin Kensrue certainly hits a home run here, releasing not just one of the best live albums of the past year, but one of the best albums of the year, period."

== Track listing ==
No.	Title	Length
1.	"Intro"	0:29
2.	"Hospital Beds" (Cold War Kids)	3:22
3.	"Buzzcut Season" (Lorde)	4:35
4.	"Jesus Christ" (Brand New)	3:37
5.	"Creep" (Radiohead)	4:22
6.	"Wrecking Ball" (Miley Cyrus)	3:43
7.	"Cold as It Gets" (Patty Griffin)	2:52
8.	"Round Here" (Counting Crows)	5:31
9.	"State Trooper" (Bruce Springsteen)	3:08
10.	"Dance Me to the End of Love" (Leonard Cohen)	3:00
11.	"Down There by the Train" (Tom Waits)	5:18
Total length:		39:57

== Charts ==
Chart (2016)	Peak position
US Americana/Folk Albums (Billboard)	9
US Independent Albums (Billboard)	25
US Top Rock Albums (Billboard)	30
