= Palms (Thrice album) =

Studio album by Thrice
- Released: September 14, 2018
- Genre: Post-hardcore; alternative rock; hard rock
- Length: 40:23
- Label: Epitaph
- Producer: Thrice; Eric Palmquist

Thrice chronology
To Be Everywhere Is to Be Nowhere (2016)	Palms (2018)	Horizons/East (2021)

Singles from Palms
- 1. "The Grey" Released: July 10, 2018; 2. "Only Us" Released: August 14, 2018; 3. "Hold Up a Light" Released: January 22, 2019

Professional ratings
Review scores
Source	Rating
AllMusic	3/5 stars
Dead Press!	9/10 stars
Punknews	3.5/5 stars
Sputnikmusic	3.4/5

Palms is the tenth studio album by American rock band Thrice. The album was released on September 14, 2018, through Epitaph Records, making it the band's first release through the label.

On July 10, the band released a single titled "The Grey" accompanied by a music video directed by Daniel Carberry. A second single from the album, "Only Us", was released August 14. The album was co-produced by the band and Eric Palmquist, and mixed by John Congleton, and is said to encompass everything from "viscerally-charged post-hardcore to piano-driven balladry".

On March 1, 2019, the band announced the Deeper Wells EP, consisting of four new tracks recorded during the Palms sessions. It was released on 12" vinyl on April 13, 2019, for Record Store Day.

== Track listing ==
All lyrics are written by Dustin Kensrue; all music is composed by Eddie Breckenridge, Riley Breckenridge, Dustin Kensrue, and Teppei Teranishi.

No.	Title	Length
1.	"Only Us"	3:44
2.	"The Grey"	4:06
3.	"The Dark"	3:49
4.	"Just Breathe"	3:57
5.	"Everything Belongs"	3:53
6.	"My Soul"	3:24
7.	"A Branch in the River"	3:49
8.	"Hold Up a Light"	3:29
9.	"Blood on Blood"	4:36
10.	"Beyond the Pines"	5:36

== Personnel ==
- Dustin Kensrue - lead vocals, rhythm guitar, synthesizers, percussion
- Teppei Teranishi - lead guitar, synthesizer, backing vocals, piano, glockenspiel
- Eddie Breckenridge - bass guitar, synthesizer, backing vocals, occasional guitars
- Riley Breckenridge - drums, programming
- Emma Ruth Rundle - backing vocals (track 4)

== Charts ==
Chart (2018)	Peak position
Australian Albums (ARIA)	95
Austrian Albums (Ö3 Austria)	27
Belgian Albums (Ultratop Flanders)	118
Canadian Albums (Billboard)	93
German Albums (Offizielle Top 100)	38
Scottish Albums (OCC)	66
Swiss Albums (Schweizer Hitparade)	45
US Billboard 200	27
US Independent Albums (Billboard)	1
US Top Hard Rock Albums (Billboard)	1
US Top Rock Albums (Billboard)	2
