= If We Could Only See Us Now =

Compilation album & DVD by Thrice
- Released: March 29, 2005
- Genre: Post-hardcore
- Length: 29:51
- Label: Island

Thrice chronology
The Artist in the Ambulance (2003)	If We Could Only See Us Now (2005)	Vheissu (2005)

Professional ratings
Review scores
Source	Rating
AllMusic	3.5/5 stars
Kerrang!	4/5 stars

If We Could Only See Us Now is a dual disc release by American rock band Thrice, and has been certified Gold by the RIAA in the "music video longform" category with sales in excess of 50,000. The first disc is a CD of rarities including unreleased songs. The second disc is a documentary of the band on DVD which covers their career from their founding up through the release of their album The Artist In The Ambulance.

== Track listing ==
No.	Title	Notes	Length
1.	"Eclipse"	The Artist in the Ambulance outtake, appeared on Japanese release	3:21
2.	"Motion Isn't Meaning"	The Artist in the Ambulance outtake, appeared on Japanese release	1:53
3.	"Stare at the Sun" (Acoustic)	The Artist in the Ambulance outtake	3:41
4.	"Cold Cash, Colder Hearts"	Recorded live at the Apple Store, 2003	3:03
5.	"The Artist in the Ambulance"	Recorded live at the Apple Store, 2003	3:47
6.	"Eleanor Rigby" (Beatles cover)	Originally from For the Kids: A Benefit for Children's Hospital of Orange County	3:51
7.	"Send Me An Angel" (Real Life cover)	Originally from Punk Goes Pop	3:27
8.	"That Hideous Strength"	The Illusion of Safety outtake	2:30
9.	"So Strange I Remember You"	Recorded live at PNC Bank Arts Center, 2004	4:18
Total length:			29:51

== Personnel ==
- Dave Gorum & Nick Bogardus – direction
- Brandon Clarke – executive producer
- Robert Stevenson – A&R
- Andy Wallace – mixing
- Brian McTernan – producer, engineer
- Matt Squire – assistant engineer
- Bill Synan – assistant engineer
- Richard Locke – lighting
- Thrice – re-arranged
- Dave Gorum – graphic design
- Teppei Teranishi – producer, mixing, engineer
- Blake Beynon – drawing
- Kelly Butler – engineer
- Michael Barbiero – producer
- Charlie Barnett – arranger, conductor
- David Berman – photography
- Jade Kuei – video footage
