= Carry the Fire (Dustin Kensrue album) =

Studio album by Dustin Kensrue
- Released: April 21, 2015
- Genres: rock, indie rock
- Length: 35:24
- Labels: Vagrant, Staple

Dustin Kensrue chronology
The Water & the Blood (2013)	Carry the Fire (2015)	Thoughts That Float on a Different Blood (2016)

Carry the Fire is the fourth studio album by Dustin Kensrue. Vagrant Records alongside Staple Records released the album on April 21, 2015.

== Critical reception ==
Professional ratings
Review scores
Source	Rating
Alternative Press	4/5 stars
Christian Review Magazine	5/5 stars
Indie Vision Music	4/5 stars
Jesus Freak Hideout	4.5/5 stars
Sputnikmusic	4/5

Signaling in a four star review by Alternative Press, Brian Shultz realizes, "It’s a robust and decidedly enjoyable affair with crystaline [sic] production... similarly rollicking pacing, memorable melodies, stylistically variant characteristics and lots of loving odes to his wife." Dan H., indicating in a four out of five review from Sputnikmusic, recognizes, "If you find pleasure in dissecting an artist’s lyrics then you’re going to find little to satiate your thirst, but if you’re content to roll along with the upbeat rhythms instead, then Carry the Fire will reward you." Specifying in a five star review at Christian Review Magazine, Leah St. John writes, "truly ... a superb release, both musically and lyrically." Scott Fryberger, awarding the album four and a half stars from Jesus Freak Hideout, states, "A worthy follow-up". Writing a four star review for Indie Vision Music, Ian Zandi says, "It may not be a perfect record but it is wholly satisfying."

== Track listing ==
No.	Title	Length
1.	"Ruby"	3:02
2.	"Back to Back"	3:36
3.	"Gallows"	3:13
4.	"There's Something Dark Inside of Me"	3:14
5.	"Death or Glory"	3:39
6.	"In the Darkness"	2:59
7.	"Of Crows and Crowns"	3:29
8.	"Juggernaut"	3:03
9.	"What Beautiful Things"	4:38
10.	"Carry the Fire"	4:32

== Charts ==
Chart (2015)	Peak position
US Billboard 200	110
US Independent Albums (Billboard)	10
US Top Rock Albums (Billboard)	18
US Indie Store Album Sales (Billboard)	22
