= The Water & the Blood =

Studio album by Dustin Kensrue
- Released: September 30, 2013
- Genre: Christian rock, indie rock, Southern rock
- Length: 41:41
- Label: BEC/Mars Hill
- Producer: Brian Eichelberger

Dustin Kensrue chronology
This Good Night Is Still Everywhere (2008)	The Water & the Blood (2013)	Carry the Fire (2015)

The Water & the Blood is the third studio album from Christian indie musician Dustin Kensrue, which was released on September 30, 2013 by BEC Recordings and Mars Hill Music, and the album was produced by Brian Eichelberger. The album has seen commercial and critical success.

== Music and lyrics ==
At Melodic.net, Tom Spinelli said that "Dustin Kensrue has found his own sound on this album, combing past elements of his previous work while experimenting with future instrumentation and delivery. If you are a fan of any of his previous work, then you will enjoy this fantastic album." In addition, Spinelli noted that the album does not contain much "filler", and compared the album to a work-out. At Alternative Press, Tim Karan compared them to the "likes of Christian stalwarts like Newsboys or Casting Crowns and from that angle, Kensrue has created an album that deserves right beside them." Furthermore, Jesus Freak Hideout's Michael Weaver wrote that the album contains "a mix of styles", which has "Some sounds may be comparable to songs on Thrice's Major/Minor, others are folksier, and some carry an alternative/southern rock sound that may bring Kings of Leon or Needtobreathe to mind. Kensrue's first worship album is an effort that is likely to bring pleasure to many ears." Also, Weaver stated that "Musically, it may be unmatched in recent years and lyrically it won't leave you bored, but instead will fuel your desire to worship God through song even when you're not at church."

Ryan Barbee of Jesus Freak Hideout told that the album was "balanced with singable melodies and attractive music that can capture the attention of Christians and non-Christians alike." Also, Barbee felt that "Not only will this album appeal to fans of Thrice, but to anyone looking for a more assertive worship sound that isn't filled with fluffy and cliché-ridden lyrics; as one person put it, 'Dustin's lyrics are like bringing a bear to a fist fight.' He most definitely did that and no doubt can call this album a TKO." At The Christian Manifesto, Lydia Akinola stated that "There's no argument about it; The Water and the Blood puts aside conventional notions of corporate worship in favour for a more singular approach to both song-writing and composition." According to Akinola, this meant that Kensrue "crafted one of the year’s most convincing, and convicting, worship projects. While we’re feasting on the music, he must be eating his words." Matt Conner of CCM Magazine said Kensrue "has crafted a moving set of rock 'n' roll songs that speak of the greatness of God and the gift of Jesus."

At HM Magazine, Rob Houston said that "Kensrue takes on his new role as a worship leader and turns the musical style he previously wrote in Thrice into a contemporary worship record." Jason Whitehorn at Worship Leader stated that "The music throughout the album is bold and without the common stabs that most artists are attempting to replicating these days." Also, Whitehorn told that "with deep lyrics that give the listener something more than a series of clichés to grasp at" with regards to this album's songs. At New Release Tuesday, Mary Nikkel wrote that "Although musically this album does not set itself too far apart from other recent indie-leaning worship projects, the thoughtful lyrics and joyful spirit make this an album well worth an attentive listen." Jonathan Kemp at The Christian Music Review Blog told that release "features possibly the most theologically sound and theologically deep lyrics" that he has listened to in quite sometime.

== Critical reception ==
Professional ratings
Review scores
Source	Rating
Alternative Press	3.5/5 stars
CCM Magazine	4/5 stars
The Christian Manifesto	5/5 stars
The Christian Music Review Blog	4.5/5 stars
Christian Music Zine	4.5/5 stars
HM Magazine	3.5/5 stars
Jesus Freak Hideout	4.5/5 stars
Kill Your Stereo	80/100
Melodic.net	3.5/5 stars
New Release Tuesday	3.5/5 stars
Worship Leader	3.5/5 stars

The Water & the Blood garnered critical acclaim from music critics to critique the album. Matt Conner of CCM Magazine called this "impressive" and it was "especially powerful for its portrayal of the work of Christ." At Alternative Press, Tim Karan noted that "This album was made for people who share Kensrue's views, not for those looking to denigrate them." Because of that, Karan wrote that "With all of that aside, The Water & The Blood is the closest thing to new Thrice any of us will be graced with for the foreseeable future, and if this is what church sounds like these days, Kensrue could beckon a whole new audience to his services—and that’s entirely why the album came to be." Melodic.net's Tom Spinelli affirmed that the release "hold up on its own", which this "does exactly that and more."

At Kill Your Stereo, Lukec felt that because this album came out of a new age church that it "makes things a little tricky as these tracks, by nature, are a very specific style, with fairly obvious subject matter, and that style is, without being too negative, kind of lame. But, on the other hand, Dustin and any kind of music results in all good things. A conundrum indeed." At HM Magazine, Rob Houston evoked that the album "has some great, uplifting tracks, but as a full record, it is a bit of a letdown." Jason Whitehorn of Worship Leader called the release "cover to cover an intense personal worship album."

At Jesus Freak Hideout, Michael Weaver felt that the album was "a definite must-have for someone longing for a deeper, more personal worship experience." Also, Jesus Freak Hideout's Ryan Barbee highlighted that "The Water and the Blood really shows excellent examples of, as Kensrue put it, satisfaction and grace." In addition, Barbee stated that "The collision of hard-hitting alternative rock with worship songs of the church, make The Water and the Blood, more than just another album but an incredible experience." Mary Nikkel of New Release Tuesday affirmed that "the content is much more concrete" than his previous work with Thrice because it has "an outpouring of theologically rich declarations."

At The Christian Manifesto, Lydia Akinola proclaimed that the result was "a resounding success, so whether you’ve been waiting years or stumbled across the album yesterday, this needs to be your next purchase. Go on – what are you waiting for?!" Anthony Peronto of Christian Music Zine told that Kensrue made "a passionate worship album that doesn't stifle the creativity of the artist. This album is Kensrue's The Water & The Blood." At The Christian Music Review Blog, Jonathan Kemp stated that "The Water & The Blood is a fantastic release from an artist who never ceases to innovate."

== Commercial performance ==
For the Billboard charting week of October 19, 2013, The Water & the Blood was the No. 52 most sold album in the entirety of the United States via the Billboard 200, and it was the No. 4 most sold Top Christian Albums and the No. 8 most sold on the Independent Albums chart. In addition, the album was the No. 17 most sold album on the Top Rock Albums chart the same week, with 7,000 copies sold. The album has sold 19,000 copies in the US as of April 2015.

== Track listing ==
No.	Title	Writer(s)	Length
1.	"Rejoice"	Dustin Kensrue, Stuart Townend	3:04
2.	"Rock of Ages"	Kensrue, Augustus Toplady	4:38
3.	"Suffering Servant"	Kensrue	4:30
4.	"My One Comfort"	Kensrue	2:42
5.	"God Is Good"	Kensrue	4:28
6.	"Grace Alone"	Kensrue	3:34
7.	"The Voice of the Lord"	Kensrue	3:48
8.	"It's Not Enough"	Brian Eichelberger, Kensrue	4:27
9.	"Come Lord Jesus"	Kensrue	3:54
10.	"O God"	Zach Bolen	4:04
11.	"It Is Finished"	Eichelberger, Kensrue	2:32
Total length:			41:41

== Charts ==
Chart	Peak position
US Billboard 200	52
US Top Christian Albums (Billboard)	4
US Independent Albums (Billboard)	8
US Top Rock Albums (Billboard)	17
