= Elvira Bary =

Russian-American author (born 1975)

- Эльвира Валерьевна Барякина
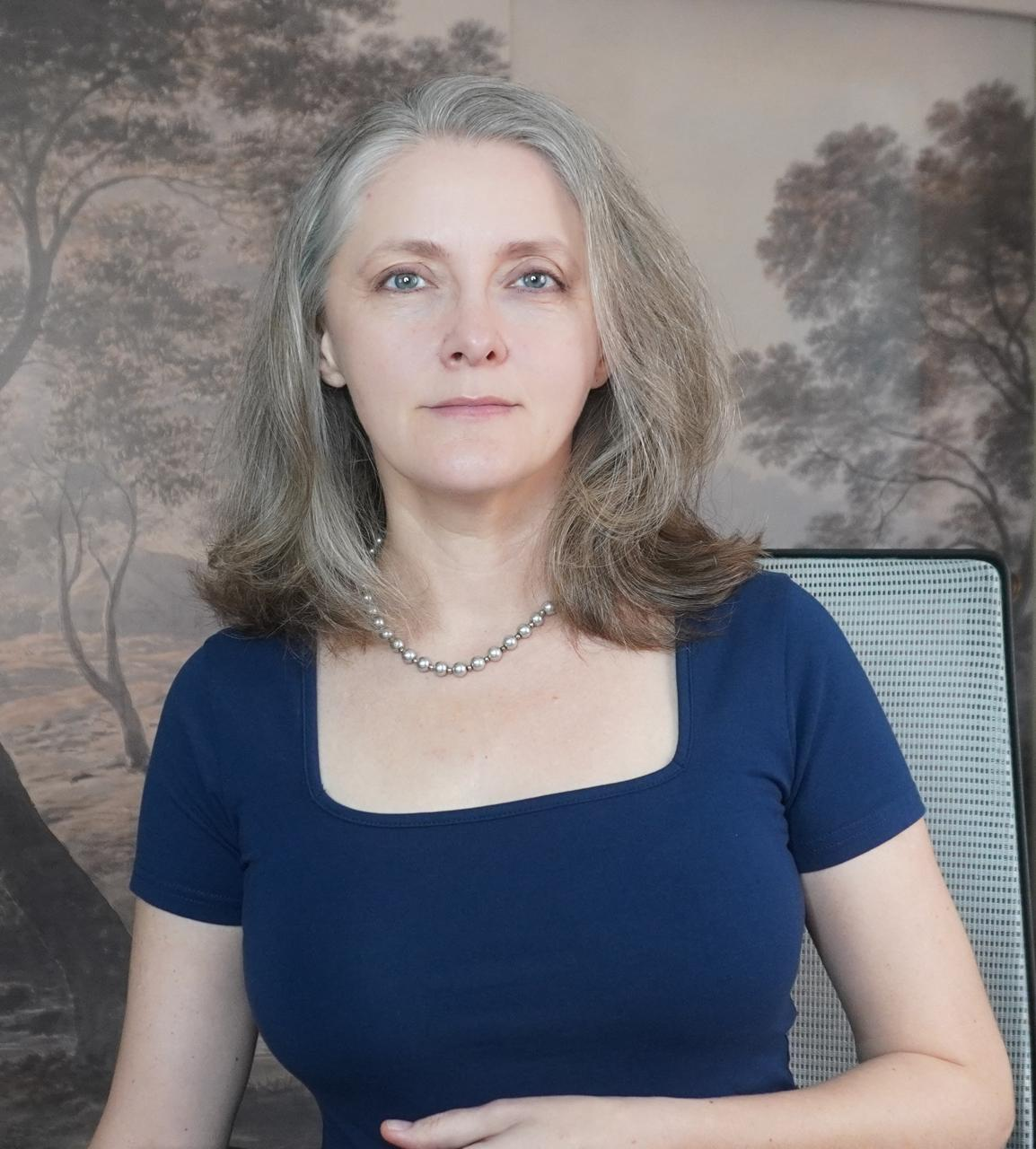
- Elvira Bary in 2026
- Born: November 9, 1975 (age 50); Nizhny Novgorod, Russia
- Citizenship: USA
- Education: Nizhny Novgorod State University
- Occupation: Novelist
- Writing career
- Period: 2001–present
- Genres: Historical fiction, Fantasy
- Notable work: The Russian Treasures trilogy
- Website: elvirabary.com

Elvira Valerievna Baryakina, (Russian: Эльвира Валерьевна Барякина; born November 9, 1975) known as Elvira Bary is a Russian-American author and YouTube creator. She is best known for her historical fiction, including The Russian Treasures series—Russian Treasures, The White Ghosts’ Empire, and The Prince of the Soviets. She also produces video essays on Russian history, politics, and culture.

Her work has been translated into English and Polish.

== Early life and education ==
Bary was born in Gorky (now Nizhny Novgorod), then part of the Soviet Union, to a family of engineers employed at GAZ (the Gorky Automobile Plant). Her first publication appeared in a local newspaper when she was 15.

She studied at Nizhny Novgorod State University and graduated with a degree in law in 1997. Before publishing her first novel, she worked as a paralegal at the Nizhny Novgorod Bar and later as a corporate lawyer, while contributing freelance articles to local newspapers.

== Career ==
Bary’s first novels were published in Moscow by Eksmo in 2001. In 2002, Bary moved to California, where she currently resides. In 2006, Bary launched an educational portal for Russian-speaking writers, Spravochnik Pisatelya (The Writer’s Guide), which became one of the largest Russian-language resources of its kind. She has taught creative writing through online and in-person lectures and workshops and has authored instructional books on writing fiction and nonfiction.

She continued publishing in Russian until 2022 when Russia’s full-scale invasion of Ukraine and her anti-war stance made publication in Russia impracticable. She subsequently shifted to writing in English. In 2025, Bary started a YouTube channel focused on Russian politics, culture, history, and the war in Ukraine. Within a year, the channel surpassed 100,000 subscribers.

== Personal life ==
Bary lives in Irvine, California, with her husband and son. Her interests include restoring antique furniture, painting, and creating AI-generated short films.

== Bibliography in English ==
=== The Russian Treasures series ===
- Russian Treasures (2017) — historical novel about the Bolshevik Revolution and the Russian Civil War
- The White Ghosts’ Empire (2020) — historical novel about rival colonial powers in China in the 1920s
- The Prince of the Soviets (2023) — historical novel about foreign journalists in Stalin-era Moscow

=== Fantasy ===
- The Girl from the Labyrinth (2021)
