= Vheissu =

Studio album by Thrice
- Released: October 18, 2005
- Recorded: April–June 2005
- Studio: Bearsville (Bearsville, New York)
- Genres: Post-hardcore; experimental
- Length: 49:20
- Label: Island
- Producer: Steve Osborne

Thrice chronology
If We Could Only See Us Now (2005)	Vheissu (2005)	The Alchemy Index Vols. I & II (2007)

Singles from Vheissu
- 1. "Image of the Invisible" Released: September 20, 2005; 2. "Red Sky" Released: February 9, 2006; 3. "Of Dust And Nations" Released: April 4, 2006

Vheissu (pronounced "vee-sue") is the fourth studio album by American rock band Thrice. Released on October 18, 2005, through Island Records, the album spawned one charting single, "Image of the Invisible", which peaked at No. 24 on Billboard's Mainstream Rock chart. Vheissu has received favorable reviews from music critics. It was the band's second release on a major label, following The Artist in the Ambulance (2003).

== Background ==
Following the release of The Illusion of Safety in 2002, the group were the subject of a major-label bidding war. They eventually signed to Island Records, who released The Artist in the Ambulance in 2003, which peaked at number 16 on the United States Billboard 200 chart. Two of its singles, "All That's Left" and "Stare at the Sun", appeared on the Alternative Songs radio chart. The band promoted the album's release with performances at the Reading and Leeds Festivals in the United Kingdom and a supporting slot for Rancid and Alkaline Trio on their mainland European tour. Thrice toured the UK and went on a North American tour with Thursday and Coheed and Cambria.

Vocalist and guitarist Dustin Kensrue said the band were aiming to move away from their roots musically with their next release, stating that guitarist Teppei Teranishi was learning how to play piano. In January 2004, the majority of staff at Island Records shifted to working at Warner Bros. Records. Despite this, A&R member Robert Stevenson continued working with the band, who liked the new people at Island. Bassist Eddie Breckenridge said by March 2004 that they had a number of ideas, but did not have a fully completed song. The group became exhausted from all the touring engagements, and took a month-long break in July 2004. Thrice had supported Dashboard Confessional on the Honda Civic Tour two months prior; it was during this time, they started discussing what to do for their next album.

== Writing ==
During the break, the members used this time to write material and experiment with music. Drummer Riley Breckenridge said Brian McTernan, who had produced The Artist in the Ambulance, told the band to start writing as soon as they had finished recording that album. The band told the label that they felt rushed making it, and needed more time to write for its follow-up. Following the break, the group spent eight-to-nine months in a home studio that they had built at Teranishi's house. A lot of the demos they had recorded were melodic, piano-focused songs, a change from their earlier hardcore punk/metal-influenced material. The band were aware they were coming up with slower-tempo material, but were oblivious as to how slow until the label and their management told them to re-think what they were doing.

By December 2004, they had stockpiled 25 songs, which would later be whittled down to 20. At the start of 2005, the band were coming towards the end of their writing process. By February 2005, the group were looking for a producer. They purposely did not want to work with McTernan again, nor did they want a popular producer either. Eddie Breckenridge said that after working on the band's previous two albums, as well as with Strike Anywhere on their releases, McTernan had an idea of how the band should sound. Kensrue said they wanted someone who lacked a formula when producing heavier rock music. In addition, eight of the 20 songs had been incorporated into the group's live shows. Stop-gap release If We Could Only See Us Now, which featured outtakes and live recordings, appeared in March 2005. Breckenridge was unsure about the project, but the label and Kensrue were positive about it.

== Recording ==
Thrice was put in contact with Howard Benson, known for his work with Hoobastank and My Chemical Romance, and had a meeting with him. Riley Breckenridge said it was an uncomfortable situation; the band were trying to tell him what they wanted to experiment with in a studio, and Benson's response was to tell them about his success with rock ballads. Eddie Breckenridge proposed toying with microphone placements, to which Benson was dismissive. The band went back to the label to have a meeting in New York City, which Riley Breckenridge felt was "disconnected", and having to justify their place on the label roster. Pre-production was done over a few days in mid-March 2005 with producer Steve Osborne. Breckenridge said they chose him because of his work with Doves and Placebo. The band wanted a new perspective on the song writing process from Osborne, whose past credits include many British rock and electronic hits. Osborne had not heard of the group or had any interest in the group's music scene prior to the sessions.

Osborne returned to the UK; the band, meanwhile, went to New York City to promote If We Could Only See Us Now. In April 2005, Osborne went back to the US for more pre-production with the band. Recording took place with Osborne at Bearsville Studios in Bearsville, New York, between April 18 and June 20, 2005. Breckenridge said that the studio was "so secluded and so cut off from everything ... and it was really cool" to have a break from the distractions of their home lives. Breckenridge said the recording process was about "getting a collective feel" of the group and retaining their "live energy". According to Kensrue, the group hoped Osborne's "strength with mellower stuff" would aid them "explore that side of our music a little more." The band had ideas for the atmospheric sound they wanted, which Osborne helped achieve. He knew how to get this sound using vintage pedals and tape delay machines. Breckenridge said Osborne's approach was focused on rhythm and subdued grooves. The group took a brief break from the studio in late April 2005 to play The Bamboozle and Coachella festivals. Dave Schiffman was the main engineer for the sessions with assistance from Chris Laidlow and Jeff Gehlert. The recordings were mixed by Sean Beavan at The Pass Studios in Los Angeles, California with assistant engineer Zephyrus Sowers in August 2005. The band members attended the mixing in person, traveling two-to-three hours to the city. The songs were then mastered by Brian Gardner at Bernie Grundman Mastering in Los Angeles.

== Composition and lyrics ==
=== Themes and music ===
Vheissu is a song cycle revolving around the themes of optimism and hope, despite continuous darkness. During early discussions for the album, the members were talking about potential concepts, eventually arriving on the subject of the ocean. Eddie Breckenridge thought it was appropriate as the material they were writing leaned "a lot more towards dreamy and atmospheric", while Kensrue wished to have the lyrics in that vein. Though in the end, the majority of the songs on the final album did not involve the ocean directly, "but [...] a lot of that kind of ended up seeping into what we did". Almost half of the record features direct quotations from the Bible, which Breckenridge attributed to Kensrue reading the works of C. S. Lewis, who also used heavy amounts of religious imagery in his writing. It was a shift away from the mythological imagery employed on The Artist in the Ambulance. Some direct comparisons were made to Lewis' The Chronicles of Narnia (1950) and Mere Christianity (1952), as well as the Book of Revelation.

The main influences on the album include Danny Elfman, Miles Davis, Isis, Hot Snakes, No Knife, Pixies, Jimmy Smith, and Thelonious Monk. The record is characterized as being a rather experimental deviation from Thrice's post-hardcore roots, with the implementation of elements such as piano melodies ("For Miles") and electronica ("Red Sky"). Parts of it recalled the post-hardcore stylings of At the Drive-In and Fugazi, with Radiohead-esque atmospheric transitions, and guitarwork in the vein of Denali. Breckenridge said the "dreamy feels and the atmospheric qualities" of the album were inspired by Talk Talk, specifically their albums Spirit of Eden (1988) and Laughing Stock (1991) Some of the tracks have mid-tempo arrangements with the loud/quiet dynamic of Thursday and Deftones, and brooding mood of the Cure. They spent eight to nine months in total writing for the album, with many of the songs being done on the European tour in support of The Artist in the Ambulance. Thrice used the program Reason to come up with new ideas. Upon returning home, they expanded upon these snippets. They ultimately re-made many of the parts they came up with, with the exception of one, which became the drum intro to "Stand and Feel Your Worth".

Kensrue made a conscious effort to scream less during the tracks, doing so only when he felt singing wouldn't convey the feeling as intended. Riley Breckenridge said they incorporated the use of various keyboard and synthesizer instrumentation. He added that they were "work[ing] on the dynamic between a really mellow part and a really heavy part." For some of the programmed sections, the band had Breckenridge re-work and edit them into loops, which Kensure said would make them "not as stale" sounding. Despite the album's heavy sound, the members no longer listened to music in that vein. They dove deeply into the final two albums from Talk Talk, and a substantial amount of Radiohead. Over the previous years, the members had been expanding their musical tastes: Riley Breckenridge with electronic artists such as Squarepusher and Aphex Twin, Teranishi and Eddie Breckenridge getting into jazz, Eddie Breckenridge exploring "less straight hardcore" acts like Botch and Isis as well as ambient music, and Kensrue listening to Tom Waits. As all of the members contribute music, the parts are influenced by different forms of music. Riley Breckenridge said it was a "really cool challenge" trying to make these separate parts into cohesive pieces of music.

=== Tracks ===
"Image of the Invisible" features Morse code, which spells out the album's title, done by Kensrue. Breckenridge said the song was written before they had the idea of adding Morse code. After looking into incorporating it with programming, they found out it had "a really cool syncopation with the beat" in the song. The track is led by gang vocal, in the style of Comeback Kid, which are heard throughout it. Though the track continued to the sound of The Artist in the Ambulance, it was compared to an Ian MacKaye-fronted Linkin Park. "Between the End and Where We Lie" sees Kensrue toy with programming, Teranishi with a Rhodes piano and Eddie Breckenridge with a synthesizer. The song grew out of keyboard parts that Kensrue wrote on a Casio, which he had since he was two years old, giving it the working title "Casio". For the track, Riley Breckenridge said he employed a method that Dave Grohl had done with his bands Foo Fighters and Queens of the Stone Age where he would play the drum kit without hitting the cymbals. Breckenridge would strictly play the kick and snare, while cymbals were then latter overdubbed; this was done to minimize the bleed between the kit pieces. The chorus chord progression was taken from an untitled piano outtake from The Artist in the Ambulance sessions.

"The Earth Will Shake" starts off as an acoustic blues track, complete with a Hammond organ played by Teranishi, before shifting into loud guitars, with Kensrue's vocals breaking into screams. The song's breakdown features an a cappella chain gang chant. The group used the upstairs living area of the recording studio, by stomping on the floor and yelling, to recreate the chants. They based it off field recordings of chain gang chants from the 1930s; for the band's chant, they did it twice and layered it, removing the high and low frequencies to give it an old sound. The track sees the group playing with different time signatures, reminiscent to a darker iteration of Oceansize and tonality of "Big Riff" by Cave In. It tackles the theme of prison inmates yearning for a jailbreak; it drew influence from poetry by C.S. Lewis and the field recordings of musicologist Alan Lomax. "Atlantic" begins with the sound of a Rhodes piano, played by Kensrue and Teranishi, with Kensrue crooning over a soft electronic beat, which is done by Teranishi and Breckenridge (the former on a synthesizer; the latter on a bass synthesizer). The chorus incorporates acoustic guitar, synthesizers and a glockenspiel. The track is the only one on the release not to feature Teranishi playing any guitar.

"For Miles" starts with a piano part played by Teranishi and Kensrue singing, which drew influence from Miles Davis. Programming by Teranishi is heard as it transitions into a post-hardcore number with progressive elements. A portion of "Hold Fast Hope" makes reference to the Bible story of Jonah; it includes a Moog synthesizer part played by Osbourne. While on tour in Japan, Teranishi bought a music box. He subsequently wrote the song "Music Box" based on musical notes made by the box, which can be heard throughout it. He added a Rhodes piano, Hammond organ and synthesizer alongside it. "Like Moths to Flame" opens with a piano intro played by Teranishi, before shifting into a heavy track in the vein of Isis. It featured synthesizer parts from both Eddie and Riley Breckenridge. Teranishi also incorporated the music box in "Of Dust and Nations", which also saw him add synthesizer, alongside Eddie Breckenridge's bass synthesizer. On "Stand and Feel Your Worth", Kensrue's vocal was compared to Further Seems Forever frontman Jason Gleason. It saw Teranishi incorporate Rhodes organ, a synthesizer, and programming, which was also done by Riley Breckenridge. Kensrue said "Red Sky" was about how people deal with issues, "but in the end things are redeemed and there's a resolution". It is driven by piano, which is played by Teranishi, and drums during the verses, with delayed guitar parts and programming by Osborne.

== Title and packaging ==
I think a key to who we see ourselves as is names; both given and those we give ourselves, both domestic and other worldly. The ways in which we define ourselves and ultimately live are, I think, heavily influenced by the names we receive, and the names we give to others.

— Dustin Kensrue in 2005 on the album's title

On June 15, 2005, the album's title was announced as Vheissu (pronounced "vee-sue"). Kensrue found the phrase Vheissu in the book V. by Thomas Pynchon, which he was reading in early 2002. Kensrue posted a detailed analysis of the name, explaining that as it had no concrete meaning, hoping people would attribute the word specifically to the album and its accompanying songs. Breckenridge explained that Kensrue "thought it was a really pretty sounding word ... It's just kind of thrown out there". Though in one interview Breckenridge said it was not a real word, in another interview he said it was also the name of a "gateway at the bottom of Mount Vesuvius to a bunch of tunnels into the underworld".

The cover artwork for Vheissu was posted online on July 14, 2005; it was created by author Dave Eggers and artist Brian McMullen. The artwork, which echoed a 1930s ouija board, features depictions of mystical creatures and questions spread around it. Although Eggers had not done any freelance work in years by that point, he was interested in working with the band. After meeting with them and reading the album's lyrics, he was keen to help them. McMullen created the final cover after Eggers and the band had chosen a basic concept. Breckenridge said the band's idea came from looking at the cover of the eleventh issue of Timothy McSweeney's Quarterly Concern, a literary journal founded by Eggers. In late 2004, Kensrue had been reading Eggers' book How We Are Hungry (2004); less than a month after this, the band began working with him. Kensrue said "references to Vheissu in [Pynchon's] book (and in critiques of the book) which could serve to inform aspects of the artwork". The German phrase "Wie heisst du?" and English phrases are included on the cover; Eddie Breckenridge said they combined phrases from different languages so they could be read as "one possible meaning of the word 'Vheissu'". Kensrue thought the phrases were "appropriate since one of the themes developing in my lyrics for the record is the ways in which we define ourselves", explaining that "Wie heisst du?" translated to "What is your name?"

A special edition, limited to 75,000 copies, was also released containing a booklet detailing the creation process of each track, and a gold-colored cover. Riley Breckenridge explained how they were fans of jazz albums, which would have liner notes describing the writing and recording of them, and wanted to emulate that for the special version. They intentionally limited this edition because of budgetary reasons, and as they were aware of how many of their fans would be buying it in the first week of release. A portion of each sale was donated to the 826 Valencia project, which was set up by Eggers to aid kids with their writing abilities.

== Release and promotion ==
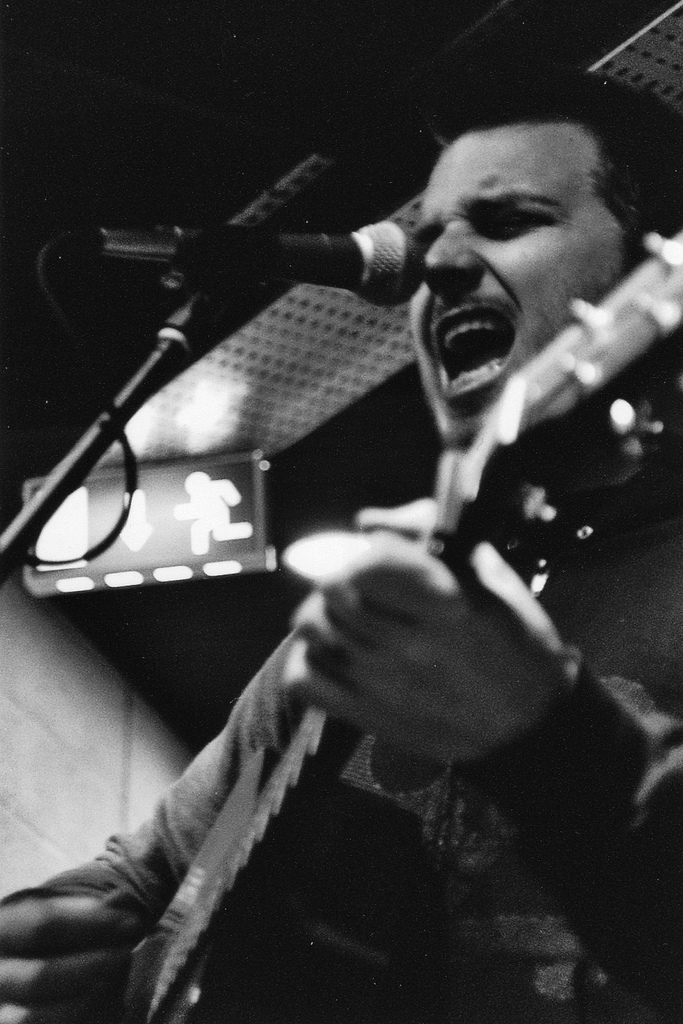
Vocalist/guitarist Dustin Kensrue performing in the UK.

Upon delivering Vheissu to Island Records, the label was unsure what to do with it as they thought it had no single-sounding songs. Over the next three months, the group performed on the Warped Tour; they did not appear on the first ten dates of the trek in order to finish recording. On July 14, 2005, Vheissu was announced for release in two months' time. "Image of the Invisible" was posted online on September 7, 2005, followed by "The Earth Will Shake" the next week. The band started a podcast to preview the forthcoming material, as well as give information on the recording process as a whole; Riley Breckenridge said the podcast was "kind of ruined" as the album leaked online three weeks ahead of its release. On September 17, 2005, the album's track listing was posted online. Three days later, "Image of the Invisible" was released as a single. On September 26, 2005, "Between the End and Where We Lie" was posted on Alternative Press' website. Between now and early October 2005, the band released four podcasts with samples of songs as well as interviews on the album.

A music video was released for "Image of the Invisible" on October 13, 2005. It was directed by Jay Martin and filmed in early September 2005. The video's treatment was the result of collaboration between Kensrue and My Chemical Romance frontman Gerard Way. Kensrue said he wanted the video to match the song's energy and dynamic, taking influence from The City of Lost Children (1995). During filming, they came across The Invisible Children Movement charity, who was raising awareness of childing in Uganda, which they promptly began supporting and encouraging their fans to help donate to. On the same day as the video, Vheissu was made available for streaming on their Myspace profile. In October and November 2005, the group went on headlining North American with support from Underoath, the Bled and Veda.

Originally planned for release on September 27, 2005, Vheissu was eventually released on October 18, 2005, through Island Records. The delay was due to the band being unable to mix the recordings while on tour, resulting in them finishing their Warped Tour dates and entering a studio to finish the process. To promote the release, the group held a competition where fans posted remixes or covers of "Image of the Invisible". The fan that won received home recording equipment worth $4,000. The group then went on tours of Japan and Australia. They ended the year with an appearance at KROQ Almost Acoustic Christmas. In January and February 2006, the group toured Europe; they were intended to co-headline the mainland with Coheed and Cambria, who cancelled because of their frontman sustaining a hand injury. Coheed and Cambria did, however, appear on the UK dates of the tour.

On February 9, 2006, "Red Sky" was released as the album's second single. From February to April 2006, the band went on the Taste of Chaos tour, which they co-headlined. On March 16, 2006, a music video for "Red Sky" premiered through AOL. On April 11, 2006, a Red Sky EP was released. It features two outtakes from the sessions ("Flags of Dawn" and "The Weight of Glory") and live versions of other tracks. Following this, the band appeared at the Groezrock and Give it a Name festivals, before embarking a tour of Europe in May 2006 with the Valley Arena. During this, a live video of the band performing "The Earth Will Shake" was posted online.

== Critical reception ==
Professional ratings
Review scores
Source	Rating
AbsolutePunk	99%
AllMusic	3/5 stars
Alternative Press	4/5 stars
Blender	3/5 stars
Entertainment Weekly	B+
God Is in the TV	2/5 stars
IGN	6.5/10
Melodic	4/5 stars
Punknews.org	4/5 stars
Sputnikmusic	4.5/5 stars

Vheissu was met with generally favourable reviews from music critics. It has been referred to as Thrice's best album due to its complexity and experimentation.

Blender writer Tom Beaujour said the band "push beyond volume and velocity into a world of sprawling, mid-tempo arrangements and esoteric influences". Patrick Slevin of The Aquarian Weekly said the album's "almost unthinkable transitions [between songs] are so well-calculated and dynamically fruitful without sounding hokey, that it seems the band has finally reconciled their tribulations with varied tones". Alternative Press editor Scott Heisel referred to it as Thrice's "most challenging effort yet, with them showing they can 'be aggressive without being empty-headed ('Image Of The Invisible'), deep without relying on cliches ('Hold Fast Hope') and heartfelt without being 'emo' ('Atlantic')". Punknews.org staff writer Jordan Rogowski offered a similar sentiment, calling it their "most ambitious" release, as the band "pushed themselves that extra mile down the path to create something special, something people will remember, and this record perfectly illustrates that". AbsolutePunk founder Jason Tate said it was "so big, so monstrous, and so gigantic – that it makes my words and my descriptions or feelings so dwarfed by comparison", sharing resemblance to Clarity (1999) by Jimmy Eat World and Deja Entendu (2003) by Brand New. Sputnikmusic staff writer Tyler Fisher said its "complexity and denseness all prove that Thrice has the most potential of any band in the world right now, a band that can change the landscape of everything known about modern rock music".

Noisey referred to it as "the sound of a post-punk band, once preferred by SoCal mall rats, attempting to thwart expectations and break free by incorporating piano melodies, atmospherics, chain gang chants, Japanese folk, and high-concept Pynchon-inspired artwork from Dave Eggers." AllMusic reviewer Johnny Loftus said the album's "real earnestness" was its music: "Insular and meticulously layered, it switches restlessly between gauzy piano figures and righteous, full-bore post-hardcore". Though added that the band's "ambition borders on self-indulgence. In Vheissu's most opaque moments you wonder, is this for everyone, or just the converted, those kids standing next to their stereos in salute?" Jason Adams of Entertainment Weekly similarly felt the band took "themselves a bit too seriously [...] but their high-minded rock has plenty for even the goofiest of us to appreciate". The A.V. Club's Kyle Ryan said it continued the "pummeling, guitar-drenched punk aggression, and melodic poppiness" of their previous two albums, "[c]onsidering the current musical climate, it'd make sense for Thrice to continue on that path". Spencer D. of IGN said the album's artwork gave him the false impression that the listener is "about to embark on a mellow, quasi-psychedelic journey when in fact it's a little more of the same old Thrice". God Is in the TV writer Mike Mantin complimented the "talented musicianship on display here", "[b]ut even with a couple of good parts, it comes together to form a faceless whole, the loud bits sounding like every other band in most genres that ends in 'core'".

== Commercial performances and legacy ==
Vheissu debuted at number 15 on the Billboard 200 chart, selling 46,000 copies in its first week. It also charted at number 17 on the Digital Albums chart. Outside of the US, it charted at number 119 in the UK. By July 2006, it had sold 197,000 copies in the US. "Image of the Invisible" charted at number 24 on the Mainstream Rock chart.

Sputnikmusic listed it at number 28 on their list of the Top 100 Albums of the 2000s. It was listed at number 20 on Paste's list of the 25 Best Punk Albums of the 2000s. Kerrang! placed it at number 10 on their Top 20 Albums of 2005.

Architects released a cover of "Of Dust and Nations" in 2013. In early 2020, Thrice embarked on a tour for Vheissu's 15th anniversary, with support from Holy Fawn, Drug Church, and mewithoutYou. Thrice were due to perform the album at the Two Thousand Trees Festival in the UK later in 2020; however, this was pushed back to 2021 and eventually 2022 due to the COVID-19 pandemic.

== Track listing ==
All lyrics are written by Dustin Kensrue; all music is composed by Thrice.

No.	Title	Length
1.	"Image of the Invisible"	4:14
2.	"Between the End and Where We Lie"	3:56
3.	"The Earth Will Shake"	4:29
4.	"Atlantic"	4:02
5.	"For Miles"	4:27
6.	"Hold Fast Hope"	4:01
7.	"Music Box"	4:46
8.	"Like Moths to Flame"	4:26
9.	"Of Dust and Nations"	4:50
10.	"Stand and Feel Your Worth"	5:52
11.	"Red Sky"	4:17
Total length:		49:20

Japanese edition bonus tracks
No.	Title	Length
12.	"Weight of Glory"	4:24
13.	"Flags of Dawn"	3:37

== Personnel ==
Personnel per booklet.

Thrice

- Dustin Kensrue – lead vocals, guitars, morse code (track 1), programming (track 2), Rhodes (track 4), percussion (track 4), glockenspiel (track 4)
- Teppei Teranishi – guitars (all tracks except track 4), backing vocals (tracks 1, 3, 4 and 9), Rhodes (tracks 2, 4, 7 and 10), Hammond (tracks 3 and 7), synthesizer (tracks 4, 7 and 9–10), piano (tracks 5, 8 and 11), programming (tracks 5 and 10), music box (tracks 7 and 9)
- Eddie Breckenridge – bass, backing vocals (tracks 1 and 3), synthesizer (tracks 2 and 8), bass synthesizer (tracks 4 and 9)
- Riley Breckenridge – drums, backing vocals (tracks 1 and 3), synthesizer (track 8), programming (track 10)

Additional musicians

- Steve Osborne – backing vocals (track 1), percussion (track 2), Moog (track 6), programming (track 11)

Production and design

- Steve Osborne – producer
- Dave Schiffman – engineer
- Chris Laidlow – assistant engineer
- Jeff Gehlert – assistant engineer
- Sean Beavan – mixing
- Zepyrus Sowers – assistant mixing engineer
- Brian Gardner – mastering
- Mark Beemer – studio photographs
- Eddie Breckenridge – studio photographs
- Dave Eggers – artwork
- Brian McMullen – cover design

== Charts ==
Chart performance for Vheissu
Chart (2005)	Peak position
Australian Albums (ARIA)	76
Canadian Albums (Nielsen SoundScan)	17
UK Albums (OCC)	119
UK Rock & Metal Albums (Official Charts)	8
US Billboard 200	15
