= Riley Breckenridge =

American drummer

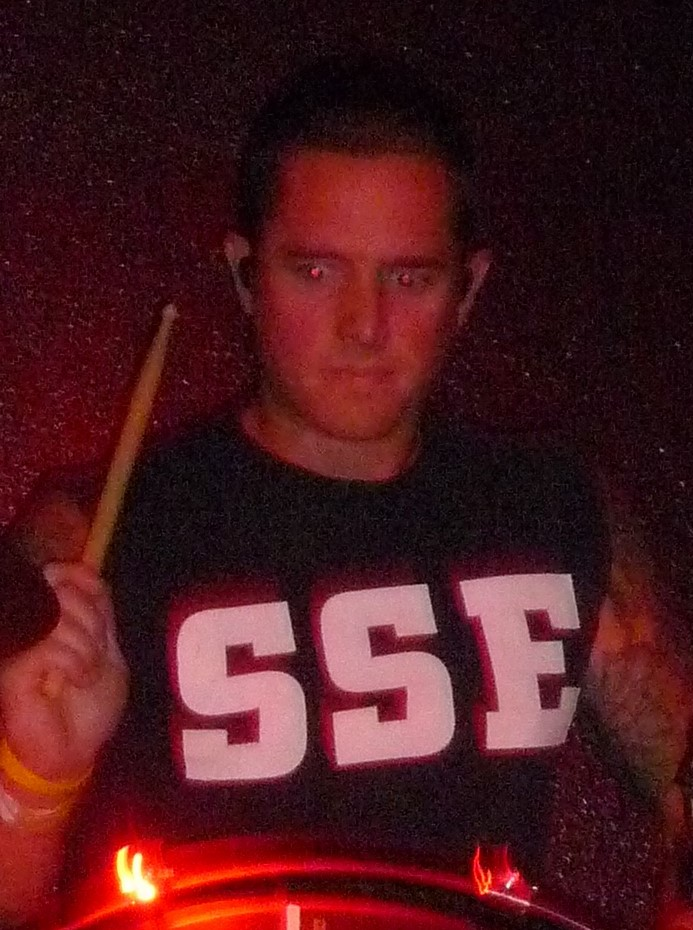
- Breckenridge performing in 2009

Background information
- Born: January 5, 1975 (age 51)
- Origin: Orange County, California, U.S.
- Genres: Post-hardcore; emo; alternative rock; melodic hardcore; experimental rock
- Instruments: Drums; percussion
- Years active: 1998–present
- Website: hermitology.com

James Riley Breckenridge (born January 5, 1975) is the drummer for the band Thrice. He plays Ludwig Drums, and uses Vic Firth drumsticks, Zildjian cymbals, Remo drumheads, with Drum Workshop hardware and pedals.

== Music career ==
Breckenridge began playing the drums in high school after tearing multiple ligaments in his legs while playing football. Being unable to play sports for several months, which had been his "only focus" previously, he bought a drum kit and taught himself to play.

The older brother of Thrice bassist Eddie Breckenridge, Riley joined Thrice during the early days of the band on the recommendation of Eddie.

Breckenridge and Ian Miller released grindcore music as "Puig Destroyer," a play on Yasiel Puig and Pig Destroyer.

=== Equipment ===
During the 2011 Major/Minor Fall Headline Tour, Brecker used a drum kit by Q Drums, with Zildjian cymbals, Remo heads, DW hardware, and Vic Firth sticks. He plays electronic sounds on a Roland SPD-SX sampling pad.

== Personal life ==
It kind of dawned on me that being 5-foot-9 and having a surgically repaired knee and not being out-of-this-world talented, the cards were stacked against me...I was better off getting a degree and focusing my time on music.

— Breckenridge, in 2008, on his experience as a baseball player.

Breckenridge, along with Morningwood lead singer Chantal Claret, wrote a monthly advice column called "Battle of the Sexes" in Alternative Press magazine for nearly 3 years; which was discontinued in the Winter of 2007. He also wrote a weekly column called "3hree Things" for OC Weekly.

Breckenridge originally had aspirations of becoming a professional baseball player. He chose to play college baseball for Pepperdine based in part on their victory in the 1992 College World Series. A middle infielder, he redshirted as a freshman and only saw limited action as a sophomore. After a coaching change at Pepperdine, he transferred to a junior college where he played for a year before giving up baseball to focus on music. He is also co-host of the baseball and music podcast, The PRODcast. In 2012, he contributed a guest article for Baseball Prospectus. Between 2012 and 2013, he wrote for SB Nation about a variety of sports.

On August 18, 2015, Jennifer Shaw, wife of Breckenridge, gave birth to their first child, Jacob Miles Breckenridge.
