= Dustin Kensrue =

American musician

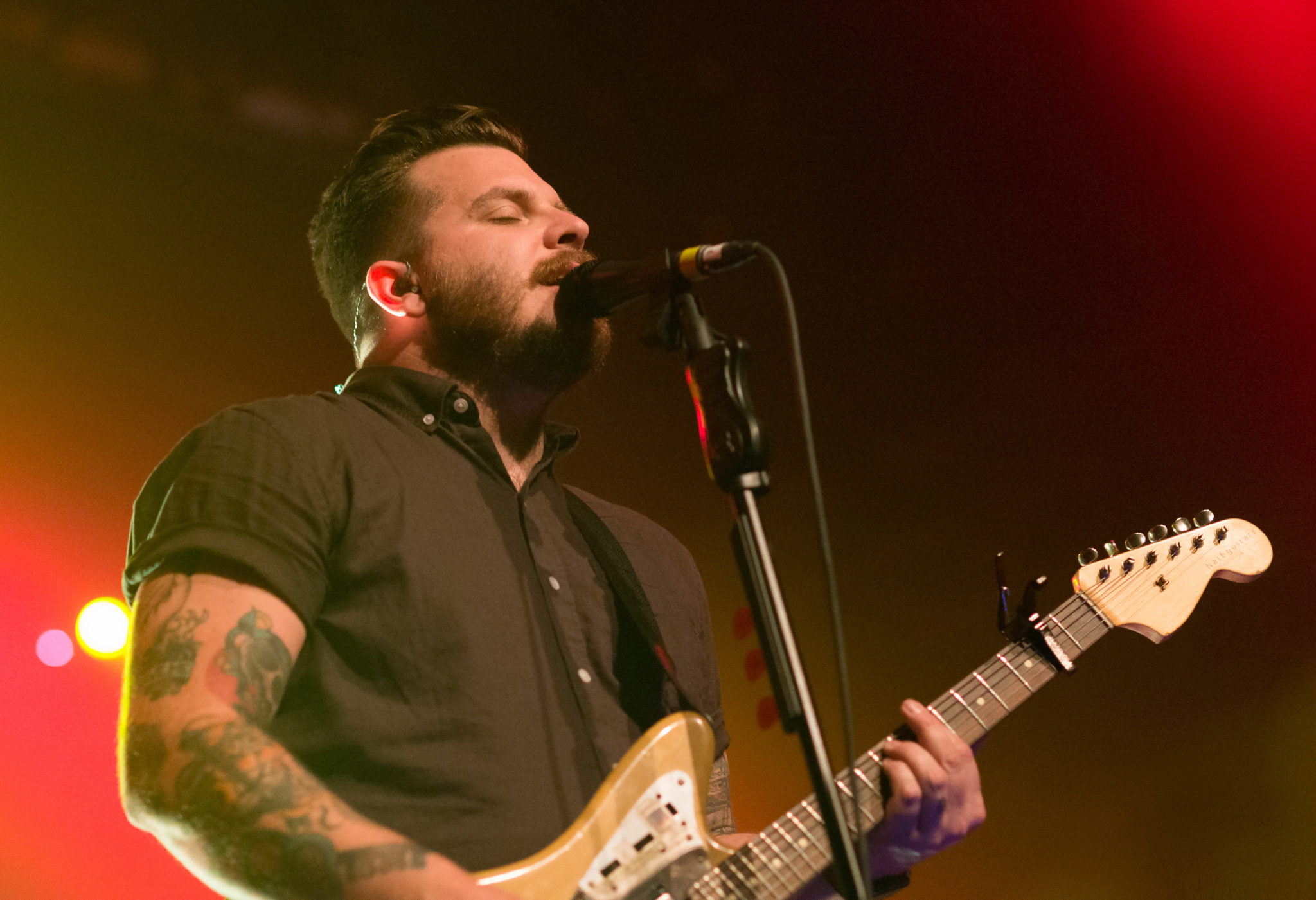
- Dustin Kensrue performing in New York in 2016

Background information
- Born: November 18, 1980 (age 45)
- Origin: Orange County, California, U.S.
- Genres: Post-hardcore; emo; alternative rock; CCM; experimental rock; folk
- Occupations: Musician; singer; songwriter
- Instruments: Vocals; guitar; harmonica
- Years active: 1998–present
- Labels: Equal Vision; Vagrant; BEC
- Website: dustinkensrue.com

Dustin Michael Kensrue (/ˈkɛnzruː/ KEHNZ-roo; born November 18, 1980) is an American musician. He is the lead vocalist and rhythm guitarist in the rock band Thrice, as well as a solo artist.

== Career ==
=== 2007: Please Come Home ===
On October 10, 2006, it was announced that Kensrue had signed with Equal Vision Records, and that the label would release Kensrue's debut solo album. On January 23, 2007, Kensrue released a solo album titled Please Come Home on Equal Vision Records. He wrapped up the recording and mixing of the album at the home of fellow Thrice member Teppei Teranishi. The album opened at 142 on the Billboard 200 with 5,800 copies sold the first week. He supported the album with a solo tour including stops on the Late Show with David Letterman, The Tonight Show with Jay Leno and The Fuse Network. Please Come Home met with mostly favorable reviews from critics, who have compared Kensrue musically to singer/songwriter Ryan Adams and Johnny Cash.

Kensrue intended to donate 5% of the proceeds from Please Come Home to a non-profit organization called To Write Love on Her Arms. In the press release, Kensrue explained the choice:

"To Write Love on Her Arms is a nonprofit movement dedicated to presenting hope and finding help for those struggling with clinical depression, addiction, self-injury and suicide. To Write Love on Her Arms began in March 2006 as a written story and an attempt to raise money for one girl's treatment. T-shirts were printed and a MySpace page was created to serve as home base for the story. Excitement spread quickly throughout MySpace and the independent music community. For 2007, TWLOHA is aiming to raise $100k for treatment and recovery. This comes in addition to online counseling and continued efforts to creatively present hope and raise awareness.

TWLOHA is a fitting choice for Please Come Home. The album lyrically exudes redemption, personal worth, love, acceptance, and hope. “I try to be an artist who aspires to find hope even in dark places: If I’m down, I don’t want to bring people down to that place with me. I’m looking for a way out," says Kensrue.

=== 2008: This Good Night Is Still Everywhere ===
On October 14, 2008, Kensrue said this on the official Thrice website - "I just finished my Christmas record. I haven’t really mentioned it because (a). I’ve been spending all my time working on it, and (b). I wasn’t totally sure I would finish it in time to come out this year. But, last night I finished it up and Teppei is finishing the mixes tonight. It’s going to be an online release only and will hopefully be out in mid-November sometime. The title is “This Good Night Is Still Everywhere” and it contains 8 covers and 2 Christmas originals. I love Christmas music so it was a lot of fun to do this and I’m glad I get to share it with you guys." "Christmas (Baby Please Come Home)" was posted on Kensrue's website on November 15. This Good Night Is Still Everywhere was released digitally through Vagrant Records on November 18.

Kensrue also added vocals in the song "The Contender" on the album "Pierce the Empire With a Sound" by experimental act The Out Circuit released on February 12, 2008. A music video for "This Is War" was released in December 2009.

=== 2013: The Water & the Blood ===
On October 1, 2013, Kensrue released his third studio album The Water & the Blood, which includes the song "It's Not Enough" and "Grace Alone". The project is a collection of mostly original corporate worship songs written while he was the Worship Pastor of Mars Hill Church Bellevue and intended to be sung at church. According to Kensrue, "all the lyrics of the record are very, very rooted in Scripture", and added: "There is power in the Word of God. As much as you stick close to that, there is power in the lyrics as well." The album debuted at No. 4 on the Billboard Christian chart and No. 52 on Billboard 200, selling 7,000 copies in its first week.

=== 2015: Carry the Fire ===
On April 21, 2015, Kensrue released his fourth solo project, Carry the Fire, which includes the song "Back to Back". The album debuted at No. 110 on Billboard 200, and No. 18 on the Top Rock Albums chart.

=== 2016: Thoughts That Float on a Different Blood ===
His fifth album, a live album of cover songs, Thoughts That Float on a Different Blood, was released on March 18, 2016, with Vagrant Records, and this album charted on three Billboard magazine charts. He also released an EP, More Thoughts That Float on a Different Blood, on November 25, 2016, on 7-inch vinyl for Record Store Day.

== Religious views and leadership ==
Kensrue has talked with many publications about his Christian faith, and holds a monergistic view of Christianity. He has a tattoo of Proverbs 9:10a ("The fear of the LORD is the beginning of wisdom") written in Hebrew on his left forearm.

In 2011, Kensrue became a deacon of the Mars Hill Church plant in Orange County, and in 2012 Mars Hill announced that Kensrue would become the worship leader for the campus located in Bellevue, Washington, and be involved in coordinating worship music across their churches. In October 2014, Kensrue resigned amid controversy surrounding pastor Mark Driscoll, returning to California with his family.

== The Modern Post ==
In 2012, Kensrue formed the band The Modern Post at the Mars Hill Church in Orange County, California. The band members include brothers Phil and Lee Neujahr on bass and drums, and Jonny Sandu on keyboard. They released the EP Grace Alone in 2012. The band also re-recorded the songs from Kensrue's solo project The Water & the Blood in a live setting, and released as The Water & the Blood (Acoustic Sessions).

In July 2014, Kensrue announced that he was working on a follow-up to This Good Night with a five-track Christmas EP including a re-working of "This Is War". The EP, titled Lowborn King was released from The Modern Post on November 24, 2014.

== Personal life ==
Kensrue and Shadlie Ruby Smith married in 2002 and went on to have three daughters together.

His younger brother, Chase Kensrue, played guitar and piano for the band Eye Alaska.

== Discography ==
=== Albums ===
Title	Album details	Chart positions				Sales
Title	Album details	US	US Christ	US Indie	US Rock	Sales
Please Come Home	Released: January 23, 2007; Label: Equal Vision; Format: CD, DL, LP	144	—	—	—	
The Water & the Blood	Released: October 1, 2013; Label: BEC Recordings/Mars Hill; Format: CD, DL, LP	52	4	8	17	US: 19,000
Carry the Fire	Released: April 21, 2015; Label: Vagrant; Format: CD, DL, LP	110	—	10	18	
Thoughts That Float on a Different Blood	Released: March 18, 2016; Label: Vagrant; Format: DL, LP	—	—	25	30	
Desert Dreaming	Released: April 5, 2024; Label: Vagrant; Format: DL, LP	—	—	—	—	
"—" denotes a recording that did not chart or was not released in that territory.

=== Christmas albums ===
Title	Album details	Chart positions
Title	Album details	US Heat
This Good Night Is Still Everywhere	Released: November 18, 2008; Label: Vagrant Records; Format: DL, LP	31

=== Extended plays ===
- 2012: Grace Alone EP (The Modern Post)
- 2014: Lowborn King EP (The Modern Post)
- 2016: More Thoughts That Float On A Different Blood (Dustin Kensrue)
