= List of Long Islanders =

This is a list of notable people either born in, from or connected to Long Island.

== List ==
Born on Long Island
Name	Date of birth	Place of birth	Date of death	Place of death	Occupation
A+	29 August 1981	Hempstead, New York	—	—	rapper
Criss Angel	19 December 1967	Hempstead, New York	—	—	illusionist
Richard Angelo	20 August 1962	West Islip, New York	—	—	serial killer
Judd Apatow	6 December 1967	Flushing, New York	—	—	movie producer
Chris Armas	27 August 1972	The Bronx, New York	—	—	soccer player
Ashanti	13 October 1980	Glen Cove, New York	—	—	entertainer
Alec Baldwin	3 April 1953	Massapequa, New York	—	—	actor
Daniel Baldwin	5 October 1960	Massapequa, New York	—	—	actor
Stephen Baldwin	12 May 1966	Massapequa, New York	—	—	actor
William Baldwin	21 February 1963	Massapequa, New York	—	—	actor
Jon Bellion	26 December 1990	Lake Grove, New York	—	—	singer, songwriter, record producer, rapper
Matt Bennett	13 November 1991	Massapequa, New York	—	—	actor, singer, screenwriter
Craig Biggio	14 December 1965	Smithtown, New York	—	—	baseball player
Sue Bird	16 October 1980	Syosset, New York	—	—	basketball player
Brendan B. Brown	11 October 1973	Northport, New York	—	—	singer, songwriter
Dan Budnik	20 May 1933	Mineola, New York	—	—	photographer
Mariah Carey	27 March 1969	Huntington, New York	—	—	singer, songwriter
Marie Colvin	12 January 1956	Oyster Bay, New York	22 February 2012	Homs, Syria	journalist
Anthony Cumia	26 April 1961	Elwood, New York	—	—	radio personality
Taylor Dayne	7 March 1962	Baldwin, New York	—	—	actress, singer
Adam Fox	17 February 1998	Jericho, New York	—	—	ice hockey player
Chris Jericho	9 November 1970	Manhasset, New York	—	—	actor, musician, wrestler
Kalomira	31 January 1985	West Hempstead, New York	—	—	singer and musician
Jesse Lacey	10 July 1978	Levittown, New York	—	—	musician
Lindsay Lohan	2 July 1986	The Bronx, New York	—	—	actress, singer
Meredith O'Connor	12 July 1996	Huntington, New York	—	—	musician
Howard Stern	12 January 1954	Jackson Heights, Queens, New York	—	—	radio personality
Joanne Tomblin		Long Island, New York	—	—	former first lady of West Virginia
Meg Whitman	4 August 1956	Cold Spring Harbor, New York	—	—	business executive
Bruce Wolosoff	27 March 1955	Manhattan, New York	—	—	composer
Raised on Long Island (but not born on Long Island)
Name	Date of birth	Place of birth	Date of death	Place of death	Occupation
Derrick Adkins	2 July 1970	Brooklyn, New York	—	—	track athlete
Mick Foley	7 June 1965	Bloomington, Indiana	—	—	wrestler
Susan Foster	—	Queens, New York	—	—	jewelry designer
Bill Freiberger	17 January 1962	Brooklyn, New York	—	—	television writer
Moira Kelly	6 March 1968	Queens, New York	—	—	actress
Ron Kovic	4 July 1946	Ladysmith, Wisconsin	—	—	activist
pH-1 (Harry Park)	23 July 1989	South Korea	—	—	rapper
Jerry Seinfeld	29 April 1954	Brooklyn, New York	—	—	comedian
Moved to Long Island as an adult (neither born nor raised on Long Island)
Name	Date of birth	Place of birth	Date of death	Place of death	Occupation
Lloyd Banks	30 April 1982	New Carrollton, Maryland	—	—	rapper
Raoul Barré	29 January 1874	Montréal, Québec, Canada	21 May 1932	Montréal, Québec, Canada	animator, artist, cartoonist
Theodore Roosevelt	27 October 1858	Flatiron District, New York	6 January 1919	Oyster Bay, New York	26th president of the United States
John Serry Sr	29 January 1915	Brooklyn, New York	14 September 2003	Valley Stream, New York	musician, composer
William Patrick Stuart-Houston	12 March 1911	Liverpool, United Kingdom	14 July 1987	Patchogue, New York	nephew of Adolf Hitler
Tazz	11 October 1967	Red Hook, Brooklyn, New York	—	—	wrestler
Princess Xenia Georgievna of Russia	22 August 1903	Mikhailovskoe, Russian Empire	17 September 1965	Glen Cove, New York	princess of Russia

== Born on Long Island ==
- 50 Cent (rapper, actor), South Jamaica, Queens
- 6ix9ine (rapper), Bushwick, Brooklyn
- Hoodie Allen (rapper), Plainview, New York
- Donatella Arpaia (restaurateur and television personality), Woodmere, New York
- Ashanti (singer), Glen Cove, New York
- Alec Baldwin (actor), Amityville, New York
- Daniel Baldwin (actor), Massapequa, New York
- Stephen Baldwin (actor), Massapequa, New York
- William Baldwin (actor), Massapequa, New York
- Madison Beer (singer, model), Jericho, New York
- Jon Bellion (singer/songwriter), Lake Grove, New York
- Pat Benatar (singer), Lindenhurst, New York
- Tony Bennett (singer), Long Island City, New York
- Nikki Blonsky (actress), Great Neck, New York
- Brian Bloom (actor), Merrick, New York
- Nicholas Braun (actor), Bethpage, New York
- Michael "Mikey" Brenley (wrestler), Patchogue, New York
- Jim Breuer (comedian), Valley Stream, New York
- Brian Burns (actor), Gibson, New York
- Edward Burns (actor, screenwriter), Woodside, New York
- Ken Burns (filmmaker), Brooklyn
- Steve Buscemi (actor), Brooklyn
- Jennifer Capriati (tennis player), New York City
- Mariah Carey (singer), Huntington, New York
- Ryan Cassata (musician), Stony Brook, New York
- Tricia Cast (actress), Medford, New York
- Frank Catalanotto (baseball player), Smithtown, New York
- Chuck D (rapper), Roosevelt, New York
- Speedy Claxton (basketball player), Hempstead, New York
- Kevin Connolly (actor), Patchogue, New York
- Kevin Conroy (actor), Westbury, New York
- Bob Costas (sportscaster), Queens
- Kevin Covais (singer, American Idol), Levittown, New York
- Billy Crystal (actor), Upper East Side, New York
- Anthony Cumia (podcaster, radio host), Flushing, New York
- Rodney Dangerfield (comedian), Deer Park, New York
- Lama Surya Das (Buddhist teacher), Valley Stream, New York
- Gary "Baba Booey" Dell'Abate (radio personality), Brooklyn, New York
- Buck Dharma (guitarist, real name Donald Roeser), Queens
- Dave Dictor (musician), Glen Cove, New York
- James Dolan (CEO), Massapequa, New York
- Billy Donovan (basketball coach), Rockville Centre, New York
- Fran Drescher (actress), Queens
- Meredith Eaton-Gilden (actress), Five Towns, New York
- Jumbo Elliot (football player), Lake Ronkonkoma, New York
- Julius Erving (basketball player), Roosevelt, New York
- Boomer Esiason (NFL quarterback), East Islip, New York
- Everlast (singer), Hempstead, New York
- Edie Falco (actress), Brooklyn
- Andrew Barth Feldman (actor), Manhasset, New York
- Jack Feldman (lyricist), Garden City, New York
- D'Brickashaw Ferguson (NFL player), Freeport, New York
- Jay Fiedler (football player), Oceanside, New York
- Amy Fisher (former convicted attempted murderer), Merrick, New York
- Flavor Flav (rapper, real name William Drayton), Roosevelt, New York
- William Floyd (signer, Declaration of Independence), Brookhaven, New York
- Melvin Fowler (former football player), Brooklyn, New York
- Adam Fox (NHL player), Jericho, New York
- Mike Francesa (sports radio commentator), Long Beach, New York
- Art Garfunkel (singer), Forest Hills, New York
- Don Genalo (former PBA Bowler), Merrick, New York
- Louis Gerstner, Jr. (businessman, former chairman and executive officer of IBM), Mineola, New York
- Debbie Gibson (singer), Merrick, New York
- Ilana Glazer (comedian, writer, actress), St. James, New York
- Tony Graffanino (MLB player), Amityville, New York
- Stanley Green (historian and writer), Brooklyn, New York
- Bob Griffin (basketball player, English literature professor), Port Washington, New York
- Leroy Grumman (engineer, co-founder of Northrop Grumman), Huntington, New York
- Tom Gugliotta (former professional basketball player), Huntington Station, New York
- Aaron Hall (R&B singer of the group Guy), The Bronx, New York
- Damion Hall (R&B singer of the group Guy), The Bronx
- Jupiter Hammon (writer, poet), Lloyd Harbor, New York
- Melissa Joan Hart (actress), Smithtown, New York
- Mo Heart (drag queen), Uniondale, New York
- Joey Heatherton (actress, singer and dancer), Rockville Centre, New York
- Christopher Higgins (hockey player), Smithtown, New York
- Emily Hughes (former figure skater), Great Neck, New York
- Gregg "Opie" Hughes (radio host), Centerport, New York
- Sarah Hughes (figure skater), Great Neck, New York
- Joe Iconis (composer/songwriter), Garden City, New York
- Michael Isikoff (investigative journalist), Syosset, New York
- Kevin James (actor, comedian), Mineola, New York
- Christine Jorgensen (actress, singer, activist), Belmont, New York
- Bob Keeshan (producer, actor), Lynbrook, New York
- Jackie Kennedy Onassis (former First Lady), Southampton, New York
- Brian Kilmeade (Fox News personality), Massapequa, New York
- Mike Komisarek (former professional ice hockey defender), West Islip, New York
- Tony Kornheiser (sports personality), Lynbrook, New York
- Michael Kors (fashion designer), Merrick, New York
- Saul Kripke (analytic philosopher), Bay Shore, New York
- Jonathan Larson (composer), White Plains, New York
- Cyndi Lauper (singer), Ozone Park, New York
- Courtney M. Leonard (artist and filmmaker)
- LL Cool J (rapper), Bay Shore, New York
- Lori Loughlin (actress), Queens
- Charles Ludlam (playwright, theater producer), Floral Park, New York
- Patti LuPone (actress, singer), Northport, New York
- Ralph Macchio (actor), Huntington, New York
- Jackie Martling (former head writer for The Howard Stern Show), Mineola, New York
- Lisa Matassa (singer), Manhasset, New York
- Steven Matz (baseball player), Stony Brook, New York
- Charlie McAvoy (NHL defenseman), Long Beach, New York
- Kate McKinnon (comedian), Sea Cliff, New York
- "Stuttering" John Melendez (comedian), Massapequa, New York
- Idina Menzel (actress, singer), Manhattan
- Method Man (rapper), Hempstead, New York
- Harvey Milk (politician), Woodmere, New York
- Larry Miller (comedian, actor), Brooklyn, New York
- Eddie Money (musician), Manhattan
- Jane Monheit (jazz singer), Oakdale, New York
- Brandon Moore (linebacker/head coach), East Meadow, New York
- Kevin Moore (keyboard player/ex-Dream Theater, Chroma Key, O.S.I.), Kings Park, New York
- Rob Moore (football player), Hempstead, New York
- John Moschitta, Jr. (FedEx TV commercial personality), Uniondale, New York
- Charlie Murphy (actor, comedian), Brooklyn
- Eddie Murphy (actor, comedian, musician), Bushwick, New York
- Michael Patrick Murphy (former Navy SEAL), Smithtown, New York
- Anthony Nese (pro wrestler), Ridge, New York
- Dan Nigro (Record producer), Massapequa, New York
- Eric Nystrom (hockey player), Syosset, New York
- Soledad O'Brien (news anchor), St. James, New York
- Meredith O'Connor (singer), Cold Spring Harbor, New York
- Rosie O'Donnell (comedian), Commack, New York
- Bill O'Reilly (commentator), Washington Heights, New York
- Steve Park (race car driver), East Northport, New York
- Rosie Perez (actress), Bushwick, New York
- Mike Petke (soccer player), Bohemia, New York
- John Petrucci (guitarist, Dream Theater), Kings Park, New York
- Mike Portnoy (drummer, Dream Theater), Long Beach, New York
- Prodigy (rapper), Hempstead, New York
- Thomas Pynchon (author), Glen Cove, New York
- R.A. the Rugged Man (rapper), Suffolk County, New York
- Rakim (MC), Wyandanch, New York
- Lou Reed (singer), Brownsville, New York
- Rev. Run (rapper), Hollis, New York
- Kim Richards (actress), Mineola, New York
- Aesop Rock (rapper, producer), Northport, New York
- Ray Romano (comedian), Queens
- Susan Sarandon (actress), Jackson Heights, New York
- Joe Satriani (guitarist), Westbury, New York
- John Savage (actor), Old Bethpage, New York
- Telly Savalas (actor), Garden City, New York
- Anthony Scaramucci (White House communications director and investment manager), Port Washington, New York
- Chuck Schuldiner (musician), Glen Cove, New York
- Hagan Scotten (former assistant U.S. attorney for the Southern District of New York)
- Rob Scuderi (former professional ice hockey defender), Syosset, New York
- Cletus Seldin (boxer), East Yaphank, New York
- Eric Sermon (rapper), Bayshore, New York
- Matt Serra (martial artist), East Meadow, New York
- Brian Setzer (guitarist), Massapequa, New York
- Kevin Shinick (writer, actor, director), Merrick, New York
- Talia Shire (actress), Lake Success, New York
- Jamie-Lynn Sigler (actress), Jericho, New York
- David Silverman (writer, animator, and director on The Simpsons), Long Island, New York
- DJ Skribble (disc jockey), Elmont, New York
- Helen Slater (actress), Bethpage, New York
- Dee Snider (singer), Astoria, New York
- Eric Spoto (power lifter), Nesconset, New York
- Aljamain Sterling (martial artist), Uniondale, New York
- Marcus Stroman (baseball player), Medford, New York
- Sugar and Spice, West Babylon, New York
- Martin Tankleff (falsely convicted of murdering parents in 1988, served 17 years in prison), Belle Terre, New York
- John Tesh (TV and radio personality), Garden City, New York
- Vinny Testaverde (former NFL quarterback), Brooklyn
- Thorgy Thor (drag queen), Ronkonkoma, New York
- Laurence Traiger (composer), Bellmore, New York
- Thomas Truxtun, Hempstead, New York
- Michael Gerard Tyson (boxing heavyweight champion), Fort Greene, Brooklyn
- Steve Vai (guitarist), Carle Place, New York
- Frank Viola (former MLB player), East Meadow, New York
- Leslie West (guitarist), Forest Hills, New York
- Walt Whitman (poet), West Hills, New York
- John Williams (composer), Flushing, New York
- Carl Yastrzemski (baseball player), Southampton, New York
- Amos Zereoué (NFL player, retired), Hempstead, New York
- Zillakami (singer, rapper, songwriter), Islip, New York
- Richard Zimler (novelist), Roslyn Heights, New York

== Raised on Long Island (but not born on Long Island) ==
- AJR (Adam, Ryan, and Jack Metzger, pop trio and multi-instrumentalists), Bayside, New York
- Lyle Alzado (professional football player), Cedarhurst, New York
- Bruce Arena (soccer coach), Franklin Square, New York
- Kenia Arias (singer), Medford, New York
- Dave Attell (comedian), Rockville Centre, New York
- David Baltimore (biologist), Great Neck, New York
- Pat Benatar (singer), Lindenhurst, New York
- Ross Bleckner (artist), Hewlett, New York
- Edith Bouvier Beale (socialite), East Hampton, New York
- Edith Ewing Bouvier Beale (socialite), East Hampton, New York
- Paul Bowles (composer, author, and translator), Jamaica, New York
- Lorraine Bracco (actress), Hicksville, New York
- Peter Breggin (psychiatrist), Hewlett Bay Park, New York
- Jim Brown (former professional football player and actor), Manhasset, New York
- Edward Burns (actor), Valley Stream, New York
- Elaine Chao (businesswoman and politician, secretary of Labor 2001–2009 and secretary of Transportation 2017–2021), Syosset, New York
- Ben Cohen (businessman), Merrick, New York
- Kenneth Cole (clothing designer), Great Neck, New York
- Margaret Colin (actress), Baldwin, New York
- Francis Ford Coppola (movie director), Great Neck, New York
- Al D'Amato (politician), Island Park, New York
- Tony Danza (actor), Malverne, New York
- Robert Davi (actor, singer, writer, and director), Patchogue, New York
- Ted Demme (director, producer, and actor), Rockville Centre, New York
- Brian Dennehy (actor), Mineola, New York
- Howard Deutch (director), Hewlett Bay Park, New York
- Elliot Easton (guitarist, The Cars), Massapequa, New York
- EPMD (rap group), Brentwood, New York
- Edie Falco (actress), North Babylon, New York
- Martin Feldstein (economist), Rockville Centre, New York
- Reggie Fils-Aimé (businessman, former president of Nintendo of America), Brentwood, New York
- J. P. Foschi (former professional football player), Mineola, New York
- Susan Foster (jewelry designer), East Hampton, New York
- Bill Freiberger (television writer and producer), North Babylon, New York
- Kate French (actress and model), Quogue, New York
- Barbara Gaines (TV producer), Hewlett, New York
- Rande Gerber (entertainment industry businessman), Hewlett, New York
- Lisa "Lisa G" Glasberg (radio personality), Woodmere, New York
- Louise Glück (poet, essayist, and winner of the 2020 Nobel Prize in Literature), Hewlett Bay Park, New York
- Doris Kearns Goodwin (historian), Rockville Centre, New York
- Jerry Greenfield (businessman), Merrick, New York
- Morlon Greenwood (former professional football player), Freeport, New York
- Al Groh (American football analyst and former player and coach), Manhasset, New York
- Carolyn Gusoff (reporter), Hewlett Bay Park, New York
- Steve Guttenberg (actor), North Massapequa, New York
- LisaGay Hamilton (actress), Stony Brook, New York
- Sean Hannity (Fox News commentator), Franklin Square, New York
- Kemp Hannon (politician), Garden City, New York
- Kene Holliday (actor), Copiague, New York
- Glenn Hughes (singer), Mineola, New York
- Billy Idol (singer), Patchogue, New York
- David Israel (television producer, writer, former sportswriter, and columnist), Melville, New York
- Billy Joel (singer), Oyster Bay, New York
- Dean Kamen (engineer, inventor, and businessman), Rockville Centre, New York
- Donna Karan (fashion designer), Woodmere, New York
- Andy Kaufman (comedian), Great Neck, New York
- Brian Keith (actor), East Rockaway, New York
- Moira Kelly (actress), Ronkonkoma, New York
- George Kennedy (actor), Mineola, New York
- Gene Larkin (former professional baseball player), North Bellmore, New York
- Lil' Mo (singer, songwriter, rapper, television and radio personality; real name Cynthia Loving), Long Island, New York
- Lil Peep (rapper, real name Gustav Åhr), Long Beach, New York
- Lil Tecca (rapper, real name Tyler-Justin Sharpe), Cedarhurst, New York
- Peggy Lipton (actress), Lawrence, New York
- Denise Lor (singer and actress), Jackson Heights, New York
- Jeffrey MacDonald (convicted murderer), Medford, New York
- Craig Mack (rapper and record producer), Brentwood, New York
- John Mackey (former professional football player), Roosevelt, New York
- Steve Madden (designer), Lawrence, New York
- Ira Magaziner (political advisor), Long Island, New York
- Biz Markie (rapper), Brentwood, New York
- Melanie Martinez (singer), Baldwin, New York
- Ashley Massaro (professional wrestler, reality television contestant, television host, model, and radio personality), Babylon, New York
- Michael McKean (actor), Sea Cliff, New York
- Idina Menzel (actress, singer, and songwriter), Syosset, New York
- MF Doom (rapper), Long Beach, New York
- Bruce Murray (sportscaster), Hewlett Bay Park, New York
- Keith Murray (rapper), Central Islip, New York
- John Myung (bassist, Dream Theater), Kings Park, New York
- Dan Nelson (singer), Levittown, New York
- Shane Olivea (former professional football player), Long Beach, New York
- Adam Pascal (actor, singer, and musician), Woodbury, New York
- Rick Pasqualone (actor), Albertson, New York
- Chrisette Michele Payne (singer-songwriter), Patchogue, New York
- pH-1 (rapper, real name Harry Park), Long Island, New York
- Robert Phillips (classical guitarist), Deer Park, New York
- Natalie Portman (actress), Jericho, New York
- The Product G&B (R&B duo), Hempstead, New York
- Rakim (rapper, real name William Griffin Jr.), Wyandanch, New York
- C. J. Ramone (bassist, The Ramones), Deer Park, New York
- Jef Raskin (human–computer interface expert, conceived and started the Macintosh project at Apple), Stony Brook, New York
- Busta Rhymes (rapper, real name Trevor Smith Jr.), Uniondale, New York
- Don Rickles (comedian), Jackson Heights, New York
- Joel Rifkin (serial killer), East Meadow, New York
- Evan Roberts (radio personality), Cedarhurst, New York
- Ray Romano (comedian), Forest Hills, New York
- Seth Rudetsky (musician, actor, writer, and radio host), North Woodmere, New York
- Zack Ryder (wrestler), Merrick, New York
- Stephanie Saland (ballet dancer and teacher), Great Neck, New York
- Jack Scalia (actor), Brentwood, New York
- Laura Schlessinger (talk show host and author), Jericho, New York
- John Sebastian (singer), Greenwich Village, New York
- Jerry Seinfeld (comedian), Massapequa, New York
- Cindy Sherman (photographer, director), Huntington, New York
- Richard Shindell (singer), Port Washington, New York
- Jim Steinman (composer, lyricist, record producer, and playwright), Hewlett, New York
- Susan Sullivan (actress), Freeport, New York
- Wally Szczerbiak (former professional basketball player), Cold Spring Harbor, New York
- Laurence Traiger (composer), Bellmore, New York
- Fred Travalena (comedian), Long Island, New York
- Jenna Ushkowitz (actress), East Meadow, New York
- Stuart Weitzman (shoe designer), Hewlett Bay Park, New York
- John Wilson (filmmaker), Rocky Point, New York
- Alan Zweibel (producer), Wantagh, New York

== Moved to Long Island as an adult (neither born nor raised on Long Island) ==
- Marco Arment (developer, podcaster)
- Eric Booker (YouTuber, competitive eater)
- Harry Chapin (musician, composer)
- John Coltrane (saxophonist)
- Perry Como (musician)
- Manuel De Peppe (actor, singer, composer, arranger, music producer)
- Nelson DeMille
- F. Scott Fitzgerald (writer)
- John Ford (musician)
- Victoria Gotti (reality-show star)
- Sal Governale (comedian)
- Joseph Heller (author)
- Chang Kee Jung (physicist)
- Otto Hermann Kahn (investment banker, collector, philanthropist and patron of the arts)
- Roger Wolfe Kahn (bandleader, composer, nightclub owner, aviator and Otto Hermann Kahn's son)
- Jack Kerouac (writer)
- Willem de Kooning (painter)
- Guy Lombardo (band leader)
- Ashley Massaro (wrestler)
- Costantino Nivola (artist and sculptor)
- Jackson Pollock (painter)
- Mario Puzo (writer)
- Jean Ritchie (dulcimer player)
- Bret Saberhagen (baseball player)
- John Serry, Sr. (musician, composer)
- C. O. Simpkins, Sr. (dentist and civil rights activist)
- Robert Sobel (professor)
- John Philip Sousa (composer)
- P. G. Wodehouse (writer)

== Connected to Long Island ==
- Blue Öyster Cult (rock band)
- The Good Rats (rock band)
- Nikola Tesla (inventor, engineer, and futurist)
- Ultra High Frequency (rock band)
