= Sanford H. Calhoun High School =

- Logo of Calhoun High School's baseball team

Location
- 1786 State St; Merrick, New York 11566; United States; 40°40′26″N 73°33′54″W

Information
- Type: Public
- School district: Bellmore-Merrick Central High School District
- NCES School ID: 361902001721
- Principal: Michael Hughes(Acting)
- Teaching staff: 124.13 (on an FTE basis)
- Grades: 9-12
- Enrollment: 1,219 (2024-2025)
- Student to teacher ratio: 9.82
- Campus: Suburban: Large
- Colors: Blue and Gray
- Mascot: Colts
- Publication: Pegasus
- Newspaper: Hoofbeats
- Yearbook: Pacer
- Website: www.bellmore-merrick.k12.ny.us/sanford-h-calhoun-high-school-home

Sanford H. Calhoun High School is a public high school located in Merrick, New York. Established in 1958, Calhoun is one of three high schools in the Bellmore–Merrick Central High School District, and acts as a magnet school for several programs.

As of the 2018–19 school year, the school had an enrollment of 1,224 students and 110.6 classroom teachers (on an FTE basis), for a student–teacher ratio of 11.1:1. There were 146 students (11.9% of enrollment) eligible for free lunch and 16 (1.3% of students) eligible for reduced-cost lunch.

== Hoofbeats ==
Hoofbeats is the official student newspaper of Calhoun. The newspaper has won numerous awards, and five editions are produced each year.

== Athletics ==
Calhoun competes in Section VIII athletics, a compilation of public schools in Nassau County. The fall season hosts boys' and girls' cross country, football, boys' and girls' soccer, girls' tennis, boys' badminton, boys' volleyball, girls' volleyball, cheerleading, and girls' swimming. The winter season hosts wrestling, boys' and girls' basketball, cheerleading, and indoor track, with district teams—including athletes from the other two schools of the district, Mepham and Kennedy—for ice hockey, swimming, diving, rifle, and bowling. The final season, spring, is home to boys' and girls' lacrosse, track and field, baseball, softball, boys' tennis, and girls' badminton.

== Calhoun Choral Program ==
The Calhoun Choral Program (CCP) is composed of over 160 students, and consists of three groups. Many students belong to more than one group.

- Concert Choir is an auditioned 75-person class composed of tenth, eleventh, and twelfth graders. Each spring, over one-hundred students audition for the incoming group. The group performs a wide variety of three-, four-, six-, and eight-part music, primarily a cappella.
- Chorale, a 3-section class made of over 80 ninth–twelfth grade students, is a group that performs a wide variety of three-part a cappella and accompanied music.
- Crescendo, the most well known of the ensembles, is an auditioned show choir of 24 to 27 students that performs pop-rock literature with choreography.

== Calhoun Band Program ==
The Calhoun Band Program consists of three main ensembles: Wind Ensemble, Symphonic Band, and Concert Band, as well as the extracurricular Calhoun Rock Band. Each ensemble is under the direction of Mr. Edward Tumminelli.

- Wind Ensemble is the most advanced of Calhoun's ensembles, consisting of about 40 students (sophomores, juniors, and seniors) selected for the group via. audition. The group is known as Calhoun's Varsity Band (CCVB). Members perform in two concerts each year and take overnight trips to locations including Disney World, Virginia Beach, and Boston.
- Symphonic Band is also composed of sophomores, juniors, and seniors, and performs in two concerts each year. No audition is required for membership.
- Concert Band is Calhoun's freshman band. The group performs in concerts with Symphonic Band. No audition is required for membership.
- Rock Band is composed of vocalists from Calhoun's Choral Program, as well as students who play rock instruments. The group performs at Sweet Sixteens, Homecoming, and football games.

== Calhoun On Tour Company ==
Calhoun High School's award-winning theatre program, The On Tour Company was founded in 1973 by Mr. James Drake and Dr. Dale Parkinson. The program, located in Merrick, New York, is one of Bellmore/Merrick’s oldest co-curricular programs.

Currently, the company, under faculty direction and the student supervision of the International Thespian Society, produce over 10 performances a year. These include four major productions; one Shakespeare, one Musical, one contemporary play (comedy or drama), and one other which may be chosen from a variety of theatre style: e.g. Children’s Theatre, Commedia dell’Arte, Ancient Greek, etc. Also produced are several Evenings of Improv or Comedy Showcases, Senior Directed One-Act Plays, touring scenes, competitions, and dinner theatre interludes.

== Notable alumni ==
- David Architzel, U.S. Navy aviator and vice admiral
- Ben Cohen and Jerry Greenfield, of Ben & Jerry's,
- Debbie Gibson, singer and actress
- Steve Grilli, baseball player
- Lindsay Lohan, actress, singer and model
- Jeff Mattson, lead guitarist and singer of Dark Star Orchestra
- Dana Milbank, author, political analyst, and columnist for The Washington Post
- Robbie Rosen, American Idol contestant
- Zack Ryder, professional wrestler
- Kevin Shinick, actor, writer, director, and creator of the animated sketch comedy show MAD
- Lou Silver, American-Israeli basketball player
- Bruce Sussman, songwriter and librettist
- Jacob Derwin, Survivor contestant
- Peter Ragone, American public affairs expert
