= 8-4 =

Video game company

8-4, Ltd.
- Native name: 有限会社ハチノヨン
- Romanized name: Yūgen Gaisha Hachi no Yon
- Type: Private
- Industry: Video games
- Founded: October 5, 2005; 21 years ago
- Founder: Hiroko Minamoto; John Ricciardi
- Headquarters: Shibuya, Tokyo, Japan
- Key people: Hiroko Minamoto (CEO); John Ricciardi (COO)
- Services: Video game localization, Video game publisher
- Website: 8-4.jp

8-4, Ltd. (Japanese: 有限会社ハチノヨン, Hepburn: Yūgen Gaisha Hachi no Yon) is a Japanese video game localization company based in Shibuya, Tokyo. The company was founded in 2005 by Hiroko Minamoto and former Electronic Gaming Monthly (EGM) editor John Ricciardi. They were joined by Ricciardi's EGM colleague Mark MacDonald in 2008, who departed in 2016 to work as VP, Production of Business and Development at Enhance Games. It performs Japanese-to-English and English-to-Japanese translation and localization on a contract basis with credits including Monster Hunter, Nier, Dragon Quest, Fire Emblem, Tales, Undertale, and Deltarune, among others. The company is named after the final level of the original Super Mario Bros., where Mario defeats Bowser and rescues Princess Peach for the very first time.

== Translation ==
8-4 generally gets involved in the localization process midway through a game's development, gaining access to a build of the game and script. Occasionally, they are invited to participate throughout the development cycle, as with the case of Shadows of the Damned. As publishers increasingly push for simultaneous worldwide release, they have noted earlier and earlier involvement in projects. In the first step of the process, they familiarize themselves with the game and others in its series by playing through them multiple times and taking notes. To perform the actual translation, they use large Microsoft Excel spreadsheets containing the script in both Japanese and English. In addition to word translation, they suggest changes to make the game more accessible to Western audiences. For example, in Glory of Heracles, they recommended that the battle speed be tripled in order to make fighting more exciting.

The team cites Richard Honeywood, founder of Square's localization department, as an influence on their translation style. Beyond merely translating the words, 8-4 attempts to convey the same experience as that of the original language version through attention to tone, user interface, and cultural references. Because of their text-heavy nature, most of 8-4's contracts are for role-playing video games such as Eternal Sonata, Tales of Vesperia, and Star Ocean: The Last Hope, which are beyond the capabilities of in-house translation teams. In translating Dragon Quest VI: Realms of Revelation, they inherited Honeywood's Dragon Quest style guide to aid them in keeping consistency between games. Speaking of their favorite projects, they look to games like Baten Kaitos Origins where the developers allowed them to take over every aspect of localization including script, debugging, quality assurance, and voice production. In 2022, 8-4 provided the translation for Masahiro Sakurai's YouTube web series, "Masahiro Sakurai on Creating Games".

== Games ==
Year	Game	Client	Notes
2005	Mario Tennis: Power Tour	Nintendo	Japanese-to-English
2006	Warship Gunner 2	Koei	Japanese-to-English
2006	Xenosaga Episode III: Also sprach Zarathustra	Namco Bandai Games	Japanese-to-English
2006	Baten Kaitos Origins	Nintendo	Japanese-to-English
2006	Tales of the Abyss	Namco Bandai Games	Japanese-to-English
2006	Gunpey	Q Entertainment	Japanese-to-English
2006	Gunpey DS	Q Entertainment	Japanese-to-English
2006	Every Extend Extra	Q Entertainment	Japanese-to-English
2007	Rogue Galaxy	Sony Computer Entertainment	Japanese-to-English
2007	Lunar Knights	Kojima Productions	Japanese-to-English
2007	Tales of the World: Radiant Mythology	Namco Bandai Games	Japanese-to-English
2007	Brave Story: New Traveler	XSEED Games	Japanese-to-English
2007	Jeanne d'Arc	Sony Computer Entertainment	Japanese-to-English
2007	Wild ARMs 5	XSEED Games	Japanese-to-English
2007	Eternal Sonata (Xbox 360)	Namco Bandai Games	Japanese-to-English
2008	Ape Quest	Sony Computer Entertainment	Japanese-to-English
2008	Culdcept Saga	Namco Bandai Games	Japanese-to-English
2008	Wild ARMs XF	XSEED Games	Japanese-to-English
2008	Soulcalibur IV	Namco Bandai Games	Japanese-to-English
2008	Tales of Vesperia	Namco Bandai Games	Japanese-to-English
2008	Eternal Sonata (PS3)	Namco Bandai Games	Japanese-to-English
2008	Tales of Symphonia: Dawn of the New World	Namco Bandai Games	Japanese-to-English
2008	Castlevania Judgment	Konami	Japanese-to-English
2008	Imagine: Ballet Star	Ubisoft	Japanese-to-English
2009	Tenchu: Shadow Assassins (Wii)	Ubisoft	Japanese-to-English
2009	Fire Emblem: Shadow Dragon	Nintendo	Japanese-to-English
2009	Star Ocean: The Last Hope	Square Enix	Japanese-to-English
2009	Tenchu: Shadow Assassins (PSP)	Ubisoft	Japanese-to-English
2009	Imagine: Makeup Artist	Ubisoft	Japanese-to-English
2009	Soulcalibur: Broken Destiny	Namco Bandai Games	Japanese-to-English
2009	Katamari Forever	Namco Bandai Games	Japanese-to-English
2009	Undead Knights	Tecmo	Japanese-to-English
2009	Petz Hamsterz Bunch	Ubisoft	Japanese-to-English
2009	Tekken 6	Namco Bandai Games	Japanese-to-English
2010	Glory of Heracles	Nintendo	Japanese-to-English
2010	White Knight Chronicles International	Sony Computer Entertainment	Japanese-to-English
2010	Star Ocean: The Last Hope International	Square Enix	Japanese-to-English
2010	Super Monkey Ball: Step & Roll	Sega	Japanese-to-English
2010	The Eye of Judgment: Legends	Sony Computer Entertainment	Japanese-to-English
2010	Nier	Square Enix	Japanese-to-English
2010	Monster Hunter Tri	Capcom	Japanese-to-English
2010	Castlevania: Harmony of Despair	Konami	Japanese-to-English
2010	Adrenalin Misfits	Konami	Japanese-to-English
2010	Echochrome II	Sony Computer Entertainment	Japanese-to-English
2011	Dragon Quest VI: Realms of Revelation	Nintendo	Japanese-to-English
2011	Dead or Alive: Dimensions	Tecmo Koei	Japanese-to-English
2011	Shadows of the Damned	Grasshopper Manufacture	Japanese-to-English, English-to-Japanese
2011	Disney Epic Mickey	Disney Interactive Studios	English-to-Japanese
2011	Wind-up Knight	Robot Invader	English-to-Japanese
2011	Zoo Resort 3D	Ubisoft	Japanese-to-English
2011	Aquaria	Semi Secret Software	English-to-Japanese
2011	The Black Eyed Peas Experience	Ubisoft	English Writing
2011	Otomedius Excellent	Konami	Japanese-to-English
2011	Fossil Fighters: Champions	Nintendo	Japanese-to-English
2012	Tales of Graces f	Namco Bandai Games	Japanese-to-English
2012	Soulcalibur V	Namco Bandai Games	Japanese-to-English DLC translation
2012	Tales of the Abyss	Namco Bandai Games	Japanese-to-English
2012	Touch My Katamari	Namco Bandai Games	Japanese-to-English
2012	Skullgirls	Reverge Labs	Inter-Office Communication
2012	Dragon's Dogma	Capcom	Japanese-to-English
2012	Gravity Rush	Sony Computer Entertainment	English Editing
2012	Steel Battalion: Heavy Armor	Capcom	Japanese-to-English
2012	Superbrothers: Sword & Sworcery EP	Capybara Games	English-to-Japanese, promotion, marketing
2013	Rise of the Blobs	Robot Invader	English-to-Japanese
2013	Skulls of the Shogun	17-BIT	English Writing, English-to-FIGSPCJKR
2013	Fire Emblem Awakening	Nintendo	Japanese-to-English
2013	Metal Gear Rising: Revengeance	Konami	Japanese-to-English
2013	Monster Hunter 3 Ultimate	Capcom	Japanese-to-English
2013	Tales of Xillia	Namco Bandai Games	Japanese-to-English
2013	Hay Day	Supercell	English-to-Japanese, Consulting
2013	République	Camouflaj LLC	English-to-FGS
2014	Boom Beach	Supercell	English-to-Japanese
2014	Drakengard 3	Square Enix	Japanese-to-English
2014	Threes!	Sirvo	English-to-FGJ
2014	Wind-up Knight 2	Robot Invader	English-to-Japanese
2014	Azure Striker Gunvolt	Inti Creates	Japanese-to-English
2014	Tales of Hearts R	Namco Bandai Games	Japanese-to-English
2015	Rogue Legacy	Cellar Door Games	Japanese publisher
2015	Neko Atsume	Hit-Point	Japanese-to-English
2015	Xenoblade Chronicles X	Nintendo	Japanese-to-English
2016	Super Time Force Ultra	Capybara Games	English-to-Japanese
2016	Mighty No. 9	Comcept	Japanese-to-English, Consulting, community management, public relations
2016	Shovel Knight	Yacht Club Games	English-to-Japanese
2016	Mario & Sonic at the Rio 2016 Olympic Games	Sega	Japanese-to-English
2016	Gotta Protectors	Ancient	Japanese-to-English
2016	Azure Striker Gunvolt 2	Inti Creates	Japanese-to-English
2017	Nier: Automata	Square Enix	Japanese-to-English
2017	Fire Emblem Echoes: Shadows of Valentia	Nintendo	Japanese-to-English
2017	Undertale	Toby Fox	English-to-Japanese, console ports, console publishing
2017	Egglia: Legend of the Redcap	DMM.com	Japanese-to-English
2017	Style Savvy: Styling Star	Nintendo	Japanese-to-English
2018	Monster Hunter: World	Capcom	English translation support
2018	Firewatch	Campo Santo	English-to-Japanese
2018	Slime Rancher	Monomi Park	English-to-Japanese
2018	Dragalia Lost	Nintendo	Japanese-to-English
2018	Return of the Obra Dinn	3909 LLC	English-to-Japanese
2018	Deltarune: Chapter 1	Toby Fox	English-to-Japanese, console ports, console publishing
2019	Bloodstained: Ritual of the Night	ArtPlay	Japanese-to-English
2019	Celeste	Extremely OK Games	English-to-Japanese
2019	SaGa: Scarlet Grace - Ambitions	Square Enix	Japanese-to-English
2020	Space Channel 5 VR: Kinda Funky News Flash!	Grounding	Japanese-to-English
2020	Tales of Crestoria	Bandai Namco Entertainment	Japanese-to-English
2021	Little Nightmares II	Bandai Namco Entertainment	English-to-Japanese
2021	Nier Replicant ver.1.22474487139...	Square Enix	Japanese-to-English
2021	Hades	Supergiant Games	English-to-Japanese
2021	Nier Reincarnation	Square Enix	Japanese-to-English
2021	Spelunky	Mossmouth	English-to-Japanese
2021	Spelunky 2	Mossmouth	English-to-Japanese
2021	Deltarune: Chapter 2	Toby Fox	English-to-Japanese, console ports, console publishing
2021	Ikenfell	Happy Star Games	English-to-Japanese
2021	Jett: The Far Shore	Superbrothers	English-to-Japanese, English-to-German
2022	Disney Twisted-Wonderland	Aniplex of America	Japanese-to-English
2022	Gotta Protectors: Cart of Darkness	Ancient	Japanese-to-English, North American and European publishing
2022	Fire Emblem Warriors: Three Hopes	Nintendo	Japanese-to-English
2023	Out Zone	Bitwave Games	English-to-Japanese
2023	Truxton	Bitwave Games	English-to-Japanese
2023	Twin Cobra	Bitwave Games	English-to-Japanese
2023	Zero Wing	Bitwave Games	English-to-Japanese
2024	Unicorn Overlord	Sega	Japanese-to-English
2024	Bō: Path of the Teal Lotus	Squid Shock Studios	English-to-Japanese
2025	Earthion	Ancient	Japanese-to-English, English-to-Japanese
2025	Deltarune: Chapters 3 and 4	Toby Fox	English-to-Japanese, console ports, console publishing
2025	UFO 50	Mossmouth	English-to-Japanese
2026	Deltarune: Chapter 5	Toby Fox	English-to-Japanese, console ports, console publishing

== Podcast ==
8-4 hosts a bi-weekly podcast dedicated to "Japan, video games, and Japanese video games", known as 8-4 Play. The main hosts include Mark MacDonald, John Ricciardi, Tina Carter, and Gabriel Deleone. Former hosts include Sarah Podzorski (now of MinnMax) and Justin Epperson. Being located in Tokyo, 8-4 has the opportunity to attend and share news about many Japanese video game industry events such as Tokyo Game Show, Capcom's Captivate, and Grasshopper Manufacture's Hoppers. As 1UP.com and EGM alumni, they maintain many of their video game journalism connections including James Mielke (now of Q Entertainment), Shane Bettenhausen (Ignition Entertainment), and David Abrams (Cheap Ass Gamer), who make regular appearances as guests on the show. They also occasionally have prominent designers as guests such as Tetsuya Mizuguchi and Akira Yamaoka. Since 2012, episodes of the podcast have been hosted on Giant Bomb. Following the 2011 Tōhoku earthquake and tsunami, 8-4 was involved in both Grasshopper Manufacture's Grasstream 2 charity event and Play For Japan: The Album, headed by Akira Yamaoka.
