= John F. Kennedy High School (Bellmore, New York) =

High school in Bellmore, New York, United States

Bellmore JFK High School

Location
- 3000 Bellmore Ave; Bellmore, New York 11710; United States; 40°39′04″N 73°31′30″W

Information
- Type: Public
- School district: Bellmore–Merrick Central High School District
- NCES School ID: 361902001724
- Principal: Gerald Owenburg
- Teaching staff: 98.00 (on an FTE basis)
- Grades: 9-12
- Enrollment: 1,071 (2023-2024)
- Student to teacher ratio: 10.93
- Campus: Suburban: Large
- Colors: Dartmouth Green and White
- Mascot: Cougars
- Accreditation: Blue Ribbon: 2020
- Nobel laureates: Paul Krugman (2008)
- Website: www.bellmore-merrick.k12.ny.us/john-f-kennedy-high-school-home

John F. Kennedy High School is a public high school located in Bellmore, New York. It is one of three high schools in the Bellmore-Merrick Central High School District. The school is ranked 29th in Best Public High Schools in New York.

== Description ==
As of the 2021–22 school year, the school had an enrollment of 999 students and 78.5 classroom teachers (on an FTE basis), for a student–teacher ratio of 13.2:1. There were 98 students (9.4% of enrollment) eligible for free lunch and 5 (0.5% of students) eligible for reduced-cost lunch.

The school is open during normal school months. Its newspaper is the Cougar Crier. In local athletics, this school is referred to as Bellmore JFK to avoid confusion with the nearby Plainview JFK.

== District ==
There are four other schools in the Bellmore-Merrick Central High School District: Wellington C. Mepham High School, Sanford H. Calhoun High School, Merrick Avenue Middle School, and Grand Avenue Middle School.

About 6,050 students are enrolled at the school district, with approximately 1,200 students in each school.

== Notable alumni ==
- Tim Canova, politician and law professor
- Kenny Dichter, CEO of WheelsUp
- Doug Ellin, creator of Entourage
- Paul Feinman (1960–2021), New York State Court of Appeals judge
- Amy Fisher, convicted of the 1992 shooting of wife of her lover
- Bill Freiberger, Emmy-nominated writer and producer of The Simpsons, The PJs, and Drawn Together
- Stephanie Hammerman, the world's first CrossFit Level 2 trainer with cerebral palsy
- Artie Kempner, Director for NFL on Fox and NASCAR
- Michael Kors (born 1959), fashion designer
- Paul Krugman (born 1953), economist, Princeton University Professor, and columnist for The New York Times, Nobel Prize in economics
- Steve Levy (born 1965), host of ESPN SportsCenter
- Scott Lipsky (born 1981), tennis player
- Daryl Palumbo, vocalist of Glassjaw and vocalist for Head Automatica
- Jillian Rossi, musician
- Marc Rowan, (born 1962) Co-founder Apollo Capital Management, Billionaire Philanthropist
- Noah Rubin (born 1996), tennis player
- Adam Schefter, ESPN football analyst
- Marc Slutsky, musician
- Jason Smilovic, writer and producer
- Laurence Traiger (born 1956), composer and musicologist
- Scott Zakarin, film producer
