= Artie Kempner =

American director for ESPN

Artie Kempner is an American journalist and a television sports director of ESPN Monday Night Football.

== Background ==
Kempner attended John F. Kennedy High School in Bellmore, New York, and was inducted into the school's Hall of Fame in 2013. He graduated from the University of Florida in 1981 with a degree in Journalism and Communications and was a member of the university's football team. He currently resides in Wilmington, Delaware.

== Career ==
Kempner has won 12 Sports Emmy Awards, including one for "Best Sports Series," recognizing his role as director of Fox Sports' NASCAR coverage.

On March 17, 2025, it was announced that Kempner would move to a director role at ESPN Monday Night Football.

== Autism advocacy ==
Kempner is the founding president of Autism Delaware, a nonprofit organization focused on supporting individuals with autism. Established as an all-volunteer group, Autism Delaware has expanded to provide services throughout the lifespan, including adult programs. Its adult services division, POW&R (Productive Opportunities for Work and Recreation), serves over 145 individuals on the autism spectrum.

Kempner began advocating for autism awareness in 1998 after his son, Ethan, was diagnosed with the disorder. He helped to establish the Fox Supports program and the Autism Speaks 400, now known as the "AAA 400 Drive for Autism" at Dover International Speedway.

In February 2015, Kempner received the 2015 OM Foundation Award at The National Sports Forum in Cincinnati. The National Sports Forum has been described as a major sports sales and marketing conference in North America.
