= Hammerman (surname) =

Hammerman is a surname. Notable people with the surname include:

- Joanne H. Alter (1927–2008), née Hammerman, American activist and politician
- Robert I. H. Hammerman (1928–2004), American judge
- Stephanie Hammerman, world's first CrossFit Level 2 trainer with cerebral palsy

== See also ==
- Jeff Hemmerman (born 1955), English former footballer
