= Thomas J. Kelly (aerospace engineer) =

American aerospace engineer (1929–2002)

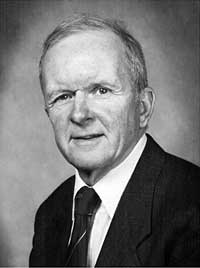
- Kelly at National Academy of Engineering
- Born: Thomas Joseph Kelly; June 14, 1929; New York City, U.S.
- Died: March 23, 2002 (aged 72); Cutchogue, New York, U.S.
- Burial place: Sacred Heart Cemetery, Cutchogue, New York, U.S.
- Education: Cornell University (BS); Columbia University (MS); Polytechnic Institute of Brooklyn (PhD)
- Occupation: Aerospace engineer
- Spouse: Joan Tantum Kelly (m. 1952)
- Children: 6

Thomas Joseph Kelly (June 14, 1929 – March 23, 2002) was an American aerospace engineer. Kelly primarily worked on the Apollo Lunar Module, which earned him the name of "Father of the Lunar Module" from NASA.

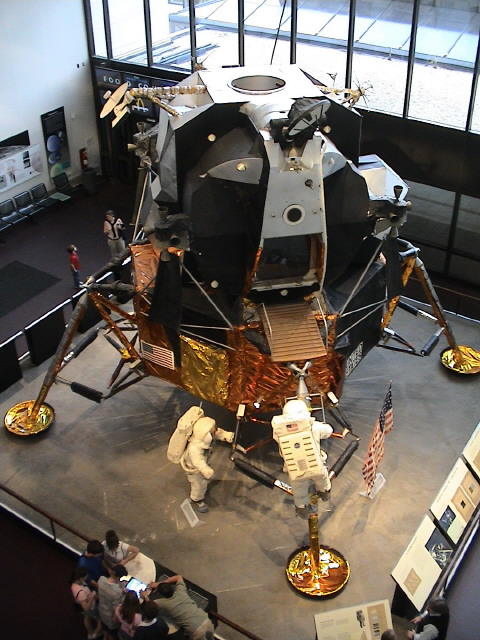
Kelly led the team at Grumman that designed and built the Lunar Module (LM2 shown)

Kelly graduated from Cornell University in 1951, where he was a member of the Quill and Dagger society. Afterwards, Kelly obtained his MS degree from Columbia University and Ph.D. from the Polytechnic Institute of Brooklyn.

Kelly was the project engineer, engineering manager and deputy program manager for Grumman Aircraft's Apollo Lunar Module (1962–1970). His 2001 book Moon Lander: How We Developed the Apollo Lunar Module documents the process of designing, building and flying the Lunar Module.

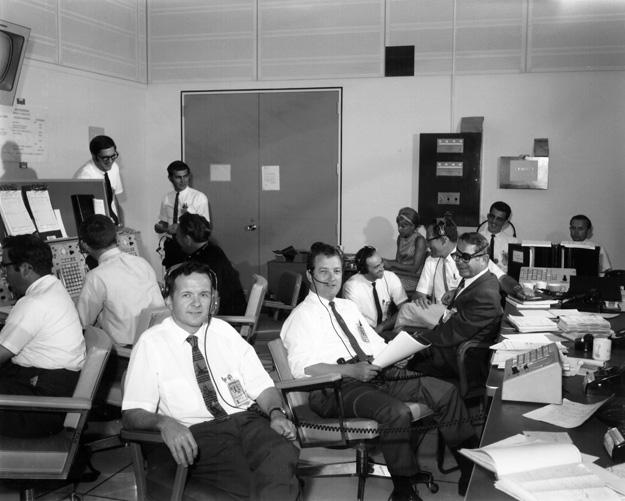
Tom Kelly and Owen Maynard (center) in the Spacecraft Analysis Room (SPAN) during the flight of Apollo 11

Kelly was portrayed by Matt Craven in the 1998 miniseries From the Earth to the Moon.

== Early life and education ==
Kelly was born on June 14, 1929, in Brooklyn, New York, and raised in Merrick, New York. He attended Wellington C. Mepham High School. While attending, Kelly was remembered by his genial nature, impish smile, playing the trumpet, and his ability to "ace" all his tests. In his local middle-class neighborhood parents would compare their children's performance to how well Tom Kelly performed. "Tom would never get a C, study harder." Even with all of his brilliance, he not once showed arrogance and was still a very likeable and popular child at what is now called Camp Avenue school in North Merrick. He eventually graduated Mepham with valedictorian.

In 1946, Kelly attended Cornell University under a Grumman scholarship. During this time he worked his summers at Grumman, eventually earning himself a bachelor's degree in mechanical engineering and a Reserve Officers' Training Corps commission in 1951. Kelly later earned a master's degree from Columbia University and a Ph.D. from the Polytechnic Institute of Brooklyn.

== Career ==
=== Grumman ===
Kelly started working at Grumman as a propulsion engineer working under the Rigel Missile Program from 1951 to 1953. After this project, he was moved to the F-11 Tiger program and later promoted to group leader.

=== Air Force ===
In 1956, Kelly was called into active duty and was stationed at the Wright-Patterson Air Force Base in Dayton, Ohio. During his duty, Kelly was a performance engineer on the B-58 Hustler, F-105 Thunderchief, and the AGM-28 Hound Dog. After two years of service, he was discharged in 1958.

=== Lockheed ===
For a short time, Kelly worked at Lockheed Corporation on their missile and space division. Kelly was the group leader of the rocket propulsion development engineering. He stayed here until 1959.

=== Return to Grumman ===
Kelly was drawn back to Grumman, in which he took up the position of assistant chief in propulsion from 1959 to 1960.

He was then moved to Grumman's Apollo and Lunar Module proposals. During this time Kelly helped develop the lunar orbit rendezvous concept.

In late 1962, Grumman won the $2-billion government contract from NASA. Kelly was promoted to lead the design team for the Lunar Excursion Module (LEM). He was in charge of more than 7,000 employees in design and building the Lunar Module. Kelly's group came up with the idea of a two-stage spacecraft (ascent & descent stage), that would take two astronauts to the Moon's surface while a third astronaut would stay in lunar orbit.

Kelly had just turned 40 when Neil Armstrong took his first historic step on the Moon July 20, 1969. During the landing, ice had formed in a fuel line, clogging it. If the heat from the engine defrosted the clog, the fuel could detonate. Luckily for Kelly and the Grumman crew, the problem corrected itself and the crew was able to relax and realize what they had accomplished. In an interview in 1998 Kelly stated, "It was the greatest thing in my career. And, in hindsight, it was even more significant than we thought at the time." However, the experience was not without strain and stress, manifested in a nervous tic he developed during the project.

In all, Grumman built fifteen lunar modules, but only six of them had the opportunity to land on the Moon's surface. Each one of these modules had significant upgrades compared to the last one. The Lunar Module is among the most significant accomplishments of Kelly's career, as it is still the only spacecraft that humans have used to land on another celestial body.

== Retirement ==
Kelly retired from Grumman in 1992 after spending 38 years with the company. Soon after his retirement, Grumman merged with Northrop to form Northrop Grumman Corporation and dispersed its operations from Long Island.

In the year 2000's Long Island: Our Past poll, Kelly was selected as the fourth favorite person from Long Island's history. He followed behind Robert Moses, Theodore Roosevelt and William Levitt.
