= David Architzel =

United States admiral

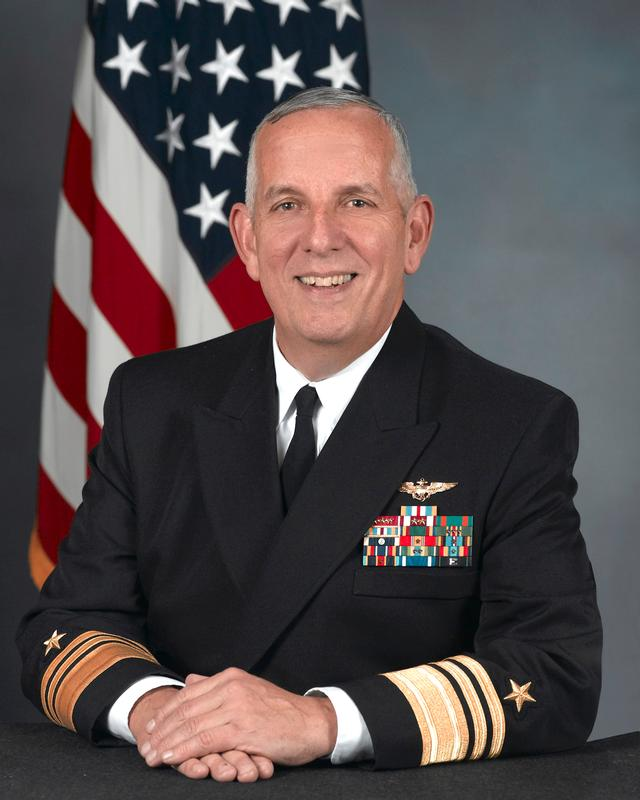
- Vice Admiral David Architzel (Ret.) (as Commander, Naval Air Systems Command)
- Born: 1951 (age 74–75); Ogdensburg, New York
- Military career
- Allegiance: United States of America
- Branch: United States Navy
- Service years: 1973–2012
- Rank: Vice Admiral
- Commands: Naval Air Systems Command; Operational Test and Evaluation Force; Navy Region Mid-Atlantic; Naval Safety Center; Iceland Defense Force; USS Theodore Roosevelt; USS Guam; VS-30
- Awards: Navy Distinguished Service Medal (2); Defense Superior Service Medal; Legion of Merit (4); Meritorious Service Medal (3); Navy and Marine Corps Achievement Medal

David Architzel (born 1951) is a retired Vice Admiral in the United States Navy. His last assignment was as Commander of Naval Air Systems Command (NAVAIR).

Vice Admiral Architzel was relieved by Vice Admiral David A. Dunaway and retired from nearly four decades of service on September 20, 2012.

== Biography ==
Architzel was born in Ogdensburg, New York. He grew up in Merrick, New York and has one brother, Ralph, and two sisters, Reba and Anne Fleming. Architzel graduated from Sanford H. Calhoun High School in 1969. Among his classmates were Bennett "Ben" Cohen, Jerry Greenfield and his twin sister Anne.

Architzel graduated from the U.S. Naval Academy in 1973 with a B.S. degree in mathematics. He later earned an M.S. degree in aeronautical systems from the University of West Florida.

Architzel served as the commanding officer of USS Guam from 1994 to 1996. He became the commanding officer of the USS Theodore Roosevelt on November 1, 1996. While serving as commanding officer of Guam and Theodore Roosevelt, his crew members were frequently treated to Ben & Jerry's ice cream by his high school classmates Ben Cohen and Jerry Greenfield.

On July 29, 2005, Architzel "assumed command as the fourth Program Executive Officer for Aircraft Carriers," according to the Navy's Web site.

Vice Adm. Architzel has accumulated over 5000 flight hours, 4300 in the S-3 Viking and the remainder in some 30 other aircraft types. His decorations include two Navy Distinguished Service Medals, the Defense Superior Service Medal, four Legions of Merit, three Meritorious Service Medals, the Navy Achievement Medal and various service related awards and campaign ribbons. He was also awarded the Spanish Naval Cross of Merit from His Majesty, King Juan Carlos of Spain, and the Navy League’s John Paul Jones Leadership Award for 1998. Architzel has been honored by Iceland by being made a Knight of the Order of the Falcon.
