= Stephanie Hammerman =

American crossfit trainer with cerebral palsy

Stephanie Hammerman-Roach is the world's first CrossFit Level 2 trainer with cerebral palsy. CrossFit has said she is the first woman with cerebral palsy to work for them as a trainer and Nike signed her as their first sponsored adaptive athlete from 2018 to 2022. She cites the death of one of her best friends in 2005 as her inspiration. She was diagnosed with Hodgkin's Lymphoma Stage 3B in 2016.

Hammerman grew up in Merrick, New York and graduated from Kennedy High School in 2008. She went on to study for a master's degree in college student affairs at Nova Southeastern University and an undergraduate degree from Lynn University in Boca Raton, Florida.

== Career ==
By the age of 30, Hammerman had been featured on Good Morning America, CNN, in Shape, People and on the YouTube channel CrossFit. Hammerman has been involved in fitness since 2012.
