= Bellmore–Merrick Central High School District =

School district in the U.S. state of New York

Location
- 1260 Meadowbrook Rd North Merrick, NY 11566-9998 Nassau County, New York United States
- Coordinates: 40.6878°N 73.5689°W

District information
- Type: Public
- Grades: 7-12
- Established: 1934
- Superintendent: Michael Harrington
- Asst. superintendent(s): Mikaela Coni Scott Bersin Eric Gomez
- Schools: 6
- Budget: $210,364,131(2026-2027
- NCES District ID: 3619020

Students and staff
- Students: 6006
- Teachers: 442.70
- Student–teacher ratio: 13.57

Other information
- Website: www.bellmore-merrick.k12.ny.us

Bellmore–Merrick Central High School District is the central high school district of the Long Island hamlets of Bellmore, North Bellmore, Merrick, and North Merrick, New York. More than 5000 students, grades 7–12, attend the Bellmore–Merrick secondary schools. There are three high schools (grades 9–12) and two (previously four) middle schools (grades 7–8) in the district.

== History ==
The district was officially established November 1, 1934 by the State Commissioner of Education. Bellmore–Merrick Central High School District was known as C.H.S.D. 3 until May, 1973 when it adopted the name reflecting its geographic location. This change was required of all districts by the state education department. 150 freshman students entering high school in September 1935, studied with five faculty members in a renovated six-room school house on Bedford Avenue. The principal was Sanford H. Calhoun. Wellington C. Mepham High School opened in 1937 with 741 students. Jerusalem Avenue Junior High School and Merrick Avenue Junior High School were opened in 1954. In 1958, the Sanford H. Calhoun High School and the Grand Avenue Junior High School were opened. In 1963, an addition was placed on the Mepham High School. Brookside Junior High School opened in September 1964. The John F. Kennedy High School opened in September 1966. By then, there were over 10,900 students in the district. Today, there are approximately 6,100 students in the district.

== List of schools ==
- High School (Grades 9–12):
  - John F. Kennedy High School (Bellmore, New York)
  - Sanford H. Calhoun High School (Merrick)
  - Wellington C. Mepham High School (Bellmore)
  - Meadowbrook alternative program (Merrick)
- Middle Schools (Grades 7–8):
  - Grand Avenue Middle School (Bellmore)
  - Merrick Avenue Middle School (Merrick)

=== Closed schools ===
The following junior high schools were closed in a consolidation effort in 1986:

- Brookside Junior High School (now used for the district offices and partially rented to other tenants). Brookside also houses the Meadowbrook Alternative Program the district's alternate learning program, for grades 10–12, one of the few in the United States.
- Jerusalem Avenue Junior High School (now a center for Nassau BOCES)

The rental of Jerusalem Avenue to Nassau BOCES, and the rental of space in Brookside that the district doesn't use generates additional income for the district. In addition, the schools' sports programs require the use of more than one gym for practice, as there are usually two sports requiring a gym in a given season. Therefore, students from Grand Avenue will sometimes practice at Jerusalem Avenue and students at Merrick Avenue will sometime practice at Brookside.

== Feeder districts ==
Students in the following elementary school districts attend schools in the Bellmore–Merrick Central High School District upon graduation:

- Bellmore Union Free School District
- North Bellmore Union Free School District
- Merrick Union Free School District
- North Merrick Union Free School District

== Curriculum ==
=== Sports & Athletics ===
Bellmore–Merrick Central High School District has many sports programs. High Schoolers can play Soccer, Volleyball, Football, Swimming, Tennis, Badminton, Cross-Country, Track, Cheerleading, Baseball/Softball, Lacrosse and, Golf. The Middle School sports program offers Cross-Country, Volleyball, Wrestling, Football, Cheerleading, Ping Pong, Tennis, Archery, Badminton, Baseball/softball, Lacrosse, and, Track. Grading for high and middle schoolers in sports is based on participation in activities and if they come/show up to class in time. District-wide ice hockey teams are available to both middle school and high school students as well.

== See also ==
- List of school districts in New York
