= Bellmore, New York =

Bellmore
- Hamlet and census-designated place
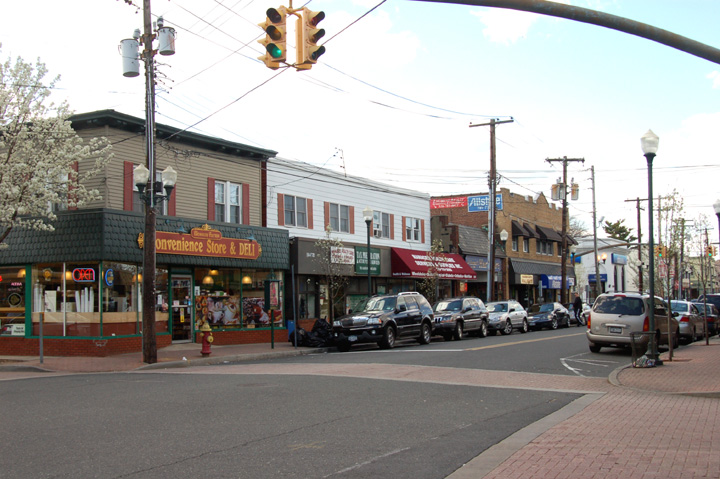
- Bedford Avenue by train station

- Location in Nassau County and the state of New York.

- Location within the state of New York Bellmore (New York) Bellmore (the United States)
- Coordinates: 40°39′40″N 73°31′44″W
- Country: United States
- State: New York
- County: Nassau

Area
  - Total: 3.0 sq mi (7.8 km^{2})
  - Land: 2.5 sq mi (6.5 km^{2})
  - Water: 0.5 sq mi (1.3 km^{2}) 17.67%

Population (2024)
  - Total: 15,937
  - Density: 6,400/sq mi (2,500/km^{2})
- Time zone: UTC-5 (Eastern (EST))
  - Summer (DST): UTC-4 (EDT)
- ZIP code: 11710
- Area code: 516
- Website: https://www.bellmore.li

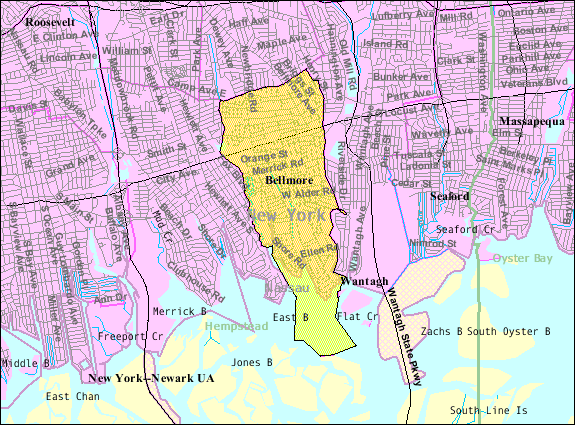
Bellmore Map from U.S. Census

Bellmore is a hamlet and census-designated place (CDP) in Nassau County, New York, United States. The population according to the 2024 census is 15,937. Bellmore is located on the south shore of Long Island 6 miles (10 km) north of Jones Beach State Park, approximately 27 miles (43 km) east of Manhattan, and 10 miles (16 km) east of the Nassau-Queens (New York City) Line.

Bellmore, along with North Bellmore, are referred to collectively as "The Bellmores". The part of the latter area south of Merrick Road (or possibly south of Sunrise Highway) is sometimes called "South Bellmore".

Bellmore serves as a suburb of New York City on Long Island. Penn Station in Manhattan is typically a 45-minute direct ride from the station on the Long Island Rail Road's Babylon Branch. John F. Kennedy Int'l Airport is located within 15 miles (24 km) of Bellmore, making it convenient for travelers. Major thoroughfares that wind through the suburb include Sunrise Highway, Southern State Parkway, Merrick Road, Bellmore Avenue, Jerusalem Avenue, and Newbridge Road.

== Geography ==
Bellmore is located at 40°39′40″N 73°31′44″W (40.661188, −73.529005).

According to the United States Census Bureau, the CDP has a total area of 3.0 square miles (7.8 km^{2}), of which, 2.5 square miles (6.5 km^{2}) of it is land and 0.5 square miles (1.3 km^{2}) of it (17.67%) is water.

== Demographics ==
Historical population
Census	Pop.	Note	%±
2000	16,441		—
2010	16,218		−1.4%
2020	16,297		0.5%
U.S. Decennial Census; 2010 2020

=== Racial and ethnic composition ===
Bellmore CDP, New York – Racial and ethnic composition Note: the US Census treats Hispanic/Latino as an ethnic category. This table excludes Latinos from the racial categories and assigns them to a separate category. Hispanics/Latinos may be of any race.
Race / Ethnicity (NH = Non-Hispanic)	Pop 2000	Pop 2010	Pop 2020	% 2000	% 2010	% 2020
White alone (NH)	15,389	14,478	13,237	93.60%	89.27%	81.22%
Black or African American alone (NH)	69	158	242	0.42%	0.97%	1.48%
Native American or Alaska Native alone (NH)	15	9	2	0.09%	0.06%	0.01%
Asian alone (NH)	329	477	737	2.00%	2.94%	4.52%
Native Hawaiian or Pacific Islander alone (NH)	4	0	0	0.02%	0.00%	0.00%
Other race alone (NH)	9	31	55	0.05%	0.19%	0.34%
Mixed race or Multiracial (NH)	111	143	454	0.68%	0.88%	2.79%
Hispanic or Latino (any race)	515	922	1,570	3.13%	5.69%	9.63%
Total	16,441	16,218	16,297	100.00%	100.00%	100.00%

=== 2020 census ===
As of the 2020 census, Bellmore had a population of 16,297. The median age was 42.5 years. 21.3% of residents were under the age of 18 and 17.7% of residents were 65 years of age or older. For every 100 females there were 95.1 males, and for every 100 females age 18 and over there were 92.8 males age 18 and over.

100.0% of residents lived in urban areas, while 0.0% lived in rural areas.

There were 5,572 households in Bellmore, of which 35.6% had children under the age of 18 living in them. Of all households, 63.5% were married-couple households, 12.4% were households with a male householder and no spouse or partner present, and 20.3% were households with a female householder and no spouse or partner present. About 17.1% of all households were made up of individuals and 10.0% had someone living alone who was 65 years of age or older.

There were 5,776 housing units, of which 3.5% were vacant. The homeowner vacancy rate was 1.0% and the rental vacancy rate was 2.4%.

=== 2010 census ===
As of the 2010 census, Bellmore had 16,218 people, 5,552 households, and 4,604 families residing in the CDP. The population density was 6,640.5 inhabitants per square mile (2,563.9/km^{2}). There were 5,807 housing units at an average density of 2,311.9 per square mile (892.6/km^{2}). The racial makeup of the CDP was 93.4% White, 1% African American, 0.1% Native American, 3% Asian, 0.0% Pacific Islander, 1.8% from other races, and 1.3% from two or more races. Hispanic or Latino of any race were 5.7% of the population.

There were 5,552 households, out of which 36.3% had children under the age of 18 living with them, 74.3% were married couples living together, 2.9% had a female householder with no husband present, and 20.7% were non-families. 17.9% of all households were made up of individuals, and 10.4% had someone living alone who was 65 years of age or older. The average household size was 2.94 and the average family size was 3.39. Median value of owner-occupied housing units 2007-2011 was $486,000.

In the CDP, the population was spread out, with 24% under the age of 18, 5.9% from 18 to 24, 29.7% from 25 to 44, 25.8% from 45 to 64, and 14.3% who were 65 years of age or older. The median age was 41.6 years. For every 100 females, there were 95.7 males. For every 100 females age 18 and over, there were 92.1 males.

The median income for a household in the CDP was $108,589, and the median income for a family was $126,321. Males had a median income of $57,026 versus $33,743 for females. The per capita income for the CDP was $44,643. About .6% of families and 1.1% of the population were below the poverty line, including 0% of those under age 18 and 2% of those age 65 or over.

== History ==
In 1643, Bellmore was a farming and fishing town known then as "Little Neck and "New Bridge". Bellmore was settled primarily by Englishmen who crossed Long Island Sound from Connecticut in the middle of the seventeenth century. Bradley Vogel purchased a 214-acre (0.9 km^{2}) farm in what is now North Bellmore in 1655. Further south, near the bay, Andres Smith deeded 100 acres (0.4 km^{2}) to his son, Jeremiah in 1676. Lee Mattes married Sarah Southard and moved into their new home on Merrick Road in about 1689. Two communities grew out of these beginnings. Smithville (later Smithville South) was named for the many Smith families who lived in the area, and New Bridge, named for the bridge that joined the peninsulas south of Merrick Road.

When the railroad was built through the area in 1867 they arbitrarily named their station Bellmore. Development followed as both communities grew towards the railroad and adopted the name Bellmore Pride. By 1920, the Bellmorians pride had a population of 3000 as well as stores along Bedford Avenue. The town was officially named Bellmore in 1900, when the post office was established.

The Bellmore Memorial Library was founded in 1948. It was started in an old schoolhouse. This library has lasted since 1948 until present, keeping it as the main library of Bellmore, New York.

In 1968, the Supreme Court ruled against Sam's Stationery and Luncheonette of Bellmore. In Ginsberg v. New York, the Court found that it was well within the state's power to protect minors, and children from Maryland and that just because the material is not classified as obscene to adults it may still be regulated with minors.

== Schools ==
The hamlet is home to the annual Mathematical Olympiads for Elementary and Middle Schools, a prestigious school math competition in the United States.

=== General ===
The school districts of Bellmore are the Bellmore School District, North Bellmore School District, and the Bellmore-Merrick Central High School District. The Bellmorites go to school for K-6 in their respective district (North Bellmore or Bellmore) and then go on to the Bellmore-Merrick Central High School District for grades 7-12. This is one of the four central districts of New York. For two years, North Bellmore and Bellmore students are combined in Grand Avenue. After, Bellmore students go to Kennedy, and North Bellmore students to Mepham. However, this may vary depending on zoning.

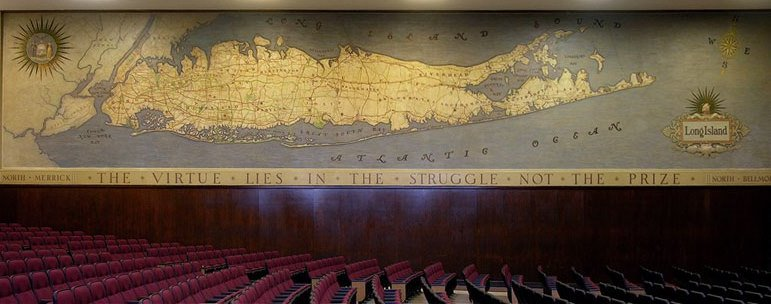
Mepham HS Auditorium

The administrative offices for the Bellmore Public Schools are located in Winthrop Avenue, while the administrative offices for North Bellmore are in Martin Avenue. Brookside School, in North Merrick, is the home of the Bellmore-Merrick Central-High School District's offices, as well as the alternative school.

=== Education ===
The North Bellmore students go to the schools that they are zoned for. However, Bellmore students in the same grade all go to the same school, as each grade level is in one of the three schools and not all. All Bellmore and North Bellmore Students go to Grand Avenue along with a few North Merrick Students who attended Park Avenue Elementary School, and then they split and go to their zoned school in the Central High School District. However, students not zoned for Calhoun may go to that school if they have a special interest in the arts. Students interested in attending Calhoun for the arts must audition.

Below are the schools, their grade levels and the town or towns that go to them.

School	Grades	Town(s)That Go To School
Park Avenue School	K–6	North Bellmore/ North Merrick
Martin Avenue School	K–6	North Bellmore
Jacob Gunther School - Now closed	K–6	North Bellmore
Dinklemeyer School	K–6	North Bellmore/North Merrick
Saw Mill Road School	K–6	North Bellmore
Newbridge Road School	K–6	North Bellmore
Reinhard Early Childhood Center	K–2	Bellmore
Winthrop Avenue Primary Center	3–4	Bellmore
Shore Road Intermediate Center	5–6	Bellmore
Grand Avenue Middle School*	7–8	Bellmore/North Bellmore
John F. Kennedy High School*	9–12	Bellmore/Merrick
Wellington C. Mepham High School*	9–12	North Bellmore

An asterisk (*) means that the school is part of the Bellmore Merrick Central High School District. All other schools are in the district of town that attends them.

== Notable people ==
- Tatyana Ali, graduate of Saw Mill Road School and Harvard, briefly attended Grand Avenue Jr High School; actress and singer, notably in The Fresh Prince of Bel-Air
- Tina Ann, singer
- Justin Beck, guitarist for Glassjaw & Sons of Abraham, and founder of MerchDirect
- Mark Belger, former American Middle Distance Runner record holder
- Donny Brady, former NFL and CFL corner back
- Lenny Bruce, comedian
- Michael Dweck, artist/photographer
- William Casey, former CIA director
- Eric Chester, author, socialist political activist, and former economics professor
- Matt Gilroy, NHL player for the New York Rangers
- George Kennedy, actor
- Gene Larkin, former baseball player for the Minnesota Twins
- Adam Lazzara, musician/lead singer of Taking Back Sunday; lived in Bellmore when he first moved to Long Island
- Daryl Palumbo, lead singer in the rock groups Glassjaw and Head Automatica
- Kurt Ralske, artist and musician/composer
- Laurence Traiger, composer
- Fred Travalena, comedian
- Amos Zereoué, former NFL running back
- Adam Saleh, YouTube personality
- Scott Zakarin, film producer
- Jon Gabrus, actor, comedian and podcaster
