= Owen Maynard =

Canadian aerospace engineer (1924–2000)

Owen E. Maynard
- Born: October 27, 1924; Sarnia, Ontario
- Died: July 15, 2000 (aged 75); Waterloo, Ontario
- Occupation: Spacecraft engineer
- Spouse: Helen Irene Richardson
- Children: Donald Ross Maynard (son), Merrill Helen Maynard Marshall (daughter), Elizabeth Anne Maynard Devlin (daughter), Annette Kathleen Maynard (daughter)
- Parent(s): Thomas George Maynard (father), Margaret Arnold (mother)

Owen Eugene Maynard (October 27, 1924 – July 15, 2000) was a Canadian engineer who contributed to the designs of the Canadian CF-105 Avro Arrow jet interceptor, and of NASA's Apollo Lunar Module (LM). Maynard was a member of the group of 32 Canadian and British engineers from Avro Canada who joined NASA when the Arrow was cancelled in 1959. Maynard worked on Project Mercury until 1960 and then moved to the Apollo program. Maynard won a U.S. patent (US3300162) in 1967 for a space station design.

== Early life ==
Owen Maynard was born in Sarnia, Ontario on October 27, 1924. He enlisted in the Royal Canadian Air Force in 1942, was trained as a Mosquito pilot, and served in England as a Flying Officer during World War II. He earned a B.A.Sc. in Aeronautical Engineering from the University of Toronto in 1951.

== Career ==
After the war, Maynard was employed by the A. V. Roe company, located at what is now Pearson International Airport in Toronto. He began there as a craftsman, and worked on the CF-100 fighter aircraft and the Avro Jetliner. After taking time off to obtain his engineering degree, he returned to A. V. Roe as a designer, eventually rising to the position of Senior Stress Engineer. He spent much of this period carrying out engineering design and analysis for the CF-105 aircraft, the Avro Arrow.

After the cancellation of the Arrow program in 1959, Maynard was one of the group of top Avro engineers who were "loaned" to the newly formed NASA's Space Task Group, in Langley, Virginia, to work on Project Mercury. (Later, after moving to Houston, this group formed the core of what became NASA's Manned Spacecraft Center, later renamed the Johnson Space Center.) Maynard was initially assigned to be Project Engineer for the first flight-test Mercury capsule. Among other activities in that role, he participated in the recovery of the Mercury-Atlas 1 capsule from the sea-floor following the failure of its launch vehicle. During the recovery operations, he performed a 30-foot free-dive to find one particular missing component of the capsule. He stated in an official interview that during the subsequent launch failure review process, his post-flight calculations showed the skin of the launch vehicle just below the spacecraft would have buckled, due to the combined drag and bending loads at the max-Q point exceeding the tensile stress in the skin due to internal pressure. Based on that finding, the NASA specified that future Mercury-Atlas launch vehicles add doublers to the skin structure in that area, and that future launch trajectories be shallowed to reduce pitch angle rate, to reduce the bending stress on the launch vehicle. This failure mode did not recur on those subsequent launches.

Not long after this, Maynard was transferred to a small team (the Advanced Vehicle Team, led by Robert O. Piland) tasked with developing concepts for possible post-Mercury NASA missions, where he made the initial sketches of a modular, 3-man spacecraft that became the basis for the Apollo spacecraft.

By 1963, Maynard became chief of the LEM engineering office in the Apollo Program Office in Houston, Texas.

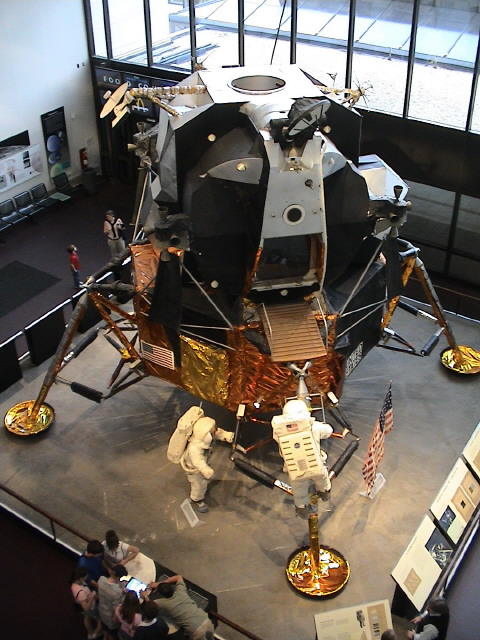
Maynard was heavily involved in the design of the Lunar Module (LM2 shown)

It was acknowledged at the time that Maynard was the person at NASA most responsible for the design of the Lunar Module, although most of detailed design work was done at Grumman Aircraft in New York under the direction of Thomas J. Kelly. In 1964, Maynard was promoted to the position of Chief of the Systems Engineering Division in the Apollo Spacecraft Program Office, which put him in charge of systems integration for the Apollo spacecraft. He held this position for most of the remainder of his career at NASA; for a time in 1966 and 1967, he was also Chief of the Mission Operations Division. While at mission operations, Maynard devised the “A” to “G” sequence for Apollo test flights leading to the first lunar landing on Apollo 11.

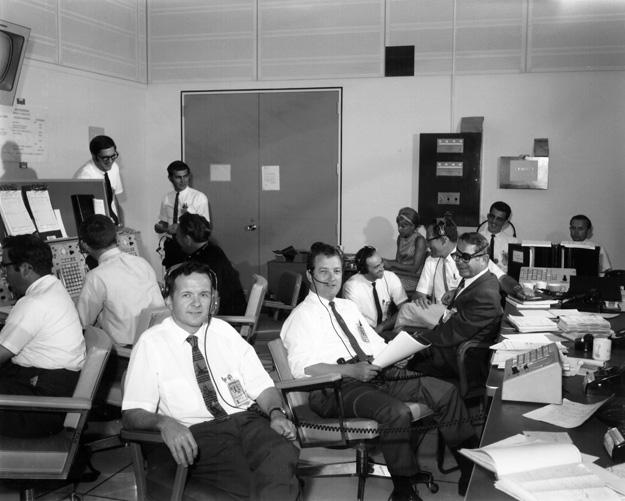
Maynard (center) and Tom Kelly in the Spacecraft Analysis Room (SPAN) during the flight of Apollo 11

Maynard chose to sleep through the landing itself, so that he could be well rested for the subsequent takeoff (which he felt would be more complex, and require greater concentration on his part).

Maynard left NASA in 1970, following the second lunar landing, and went on to Raytheon in the Boston area. There he worked on many aerospace programs. He also became an advocate for the use of solar power collected on earth for powering spacecraft, and of Solar Power Satellites to collect solar power for usage on Earth. In 1992, he retired from Raytheon, and he and his wife Helen returned to Canada, where they settled in Waterloo, Ontario, where he died on July 15, 2000.

== Awards, citations and honours ==
- NASA Exceptional Service Medal (twice)
- Doctorate of Engineering, honoris causa, University of Toronto (1996)
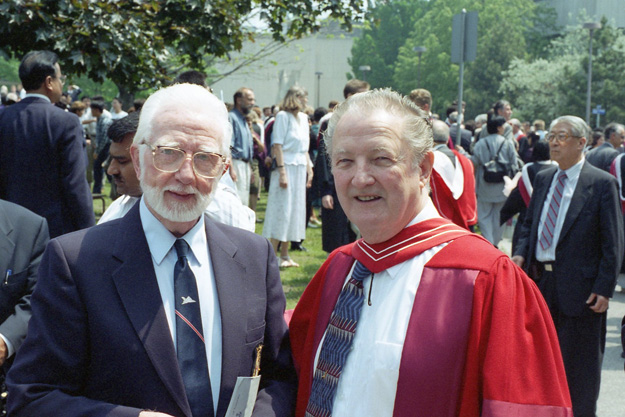
  Jim Floyd and Owen Maynard at the University of Toronto following Maynard's D.Eng. ceremony
- Asteroid 5132 Maynard (1990 ME) is named after Owen Maynard
