= Frank Bartkus =

American soccer player (1915–1986)

Personal information
- Full name: Francis Anthony Bartkus
- Date of birth: November 11, 1915
- Date of death: September 2, 1986 (aged 70)
- Place of death: Merrick, New York, U.S.
- Position: Goalkeeper

Senior career*
| Years | Team | Apps | (Gls) |
- Brooklyn German Sport Club

International career
| 1936 | United States | 1 | (0) |
- * Club domestic league appearances and goals

Francis Anthony Bartkus (November 11, 1915 – September 2, 1986) was a U.S. soccer goalkeeper who was a member of the U.S. soccer team at the 1936 Summer Olympics.

Bartkus was selected as a member of the U.S. soccer team at the 1936 Olympic Games. He played in the only U.S. game of the tournament, a 1–0 loss to Italy. At the time, he played for the Brooklyn German Sports Club of the German American Soccer League. German S.C. won the 1936 National Amateur Cup.
