= Mark Belger =

American middle-distance runner

Personal information
- Nationality: American
- Born: September 6, 1956 (age 69)

Sport
- Sport: Athletics
- Event: middle-distance

Mark Belger (born September 6, 1956) is a former American middle distance runner. In high school, he set the American record in the 880 yards. While attending Villanova University, Belger set the record of winning ten Penn Relays golden watches.

== Early life ==
Belger grew up in Bellmore, New York where he attended Wellington C. Mepham High School. He was born to a strict, middle-income family. After being unable to continue playing the sports of wrestling, soccer, and football due to various injuries, he turned his sights to running where he was met with great success.

== High school career ==
After being told by his father that he was required to participate in an after school activity, Belger joined the Mepham track team under coach Paul Limmer. During a President Kennedy fitness test, Belger won his first trophy in a 600-yard dash. Following this, Belger typically ran middle distance events, consisting of the 600 yard and 880-yard dashes, though he unwillingly stepped up to longer distance and cross-country events. During this time, Belger won various County and State title. Most notably, Belger received national fame by setting the then high school record in the 880-yard dash.

== Success in college ==
Belger attended Villanova where he continued to run during his four years. During his career he primarily ran the 800m dash, as well as different legs of relays, racing up to four or five races in a single weekend. While at Villanova, Belger set the world record for the most Penn Relay Golden Watches ever won. Belger was undefeated in his ten competitions.

Belger continued to run successfully for Villanova, placing fourth in the 1976 US Olympic Trials. Two years later, Belger was the NCAA champion in the 800m dash.

== Postgraduate running, and later life ==
In 1980, Belger was set to run for the United States in the Olympic Games, yet missed the opportunity due to the boycott of the games that took place. Afterwards, Belger began traveling to participate in major races around the country and the world.

After graduating, Belger worked as an economic analyst in Boston, predicting the price of raw materials for the auto industry and other developers. Belger now lives in Pacific Beach, CA with his wife Mimi. His two daughters, Erin and Sarah, also runners, received college scholarships, following in his footsteps. His son, Thomas, ran cross country and track for University City HS in San Diego.
