= Matthew Nuccio =

American toy designer

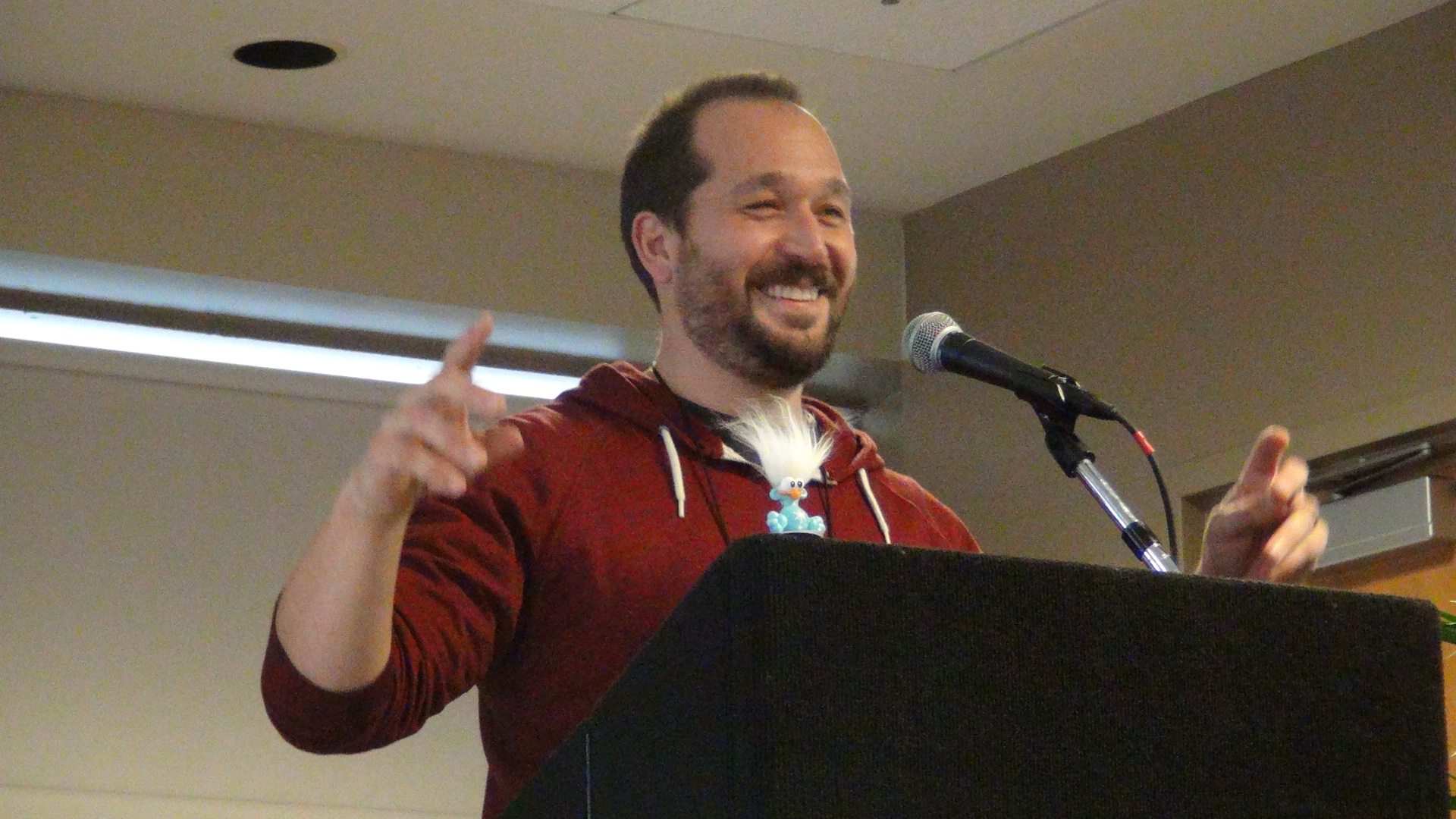
Matthew Nuccio in 2022.

Matthew (Matt) Nuccio (born March 20, 1974, in Merrick, New York) is a toy designer co-credited with designing Creepy Crawlers, Tickle Me Elmo, Nintendo Power Glove, P.O.G's, Laser Challenge and Barbie Sparkle Kingdom. Products he designed have been embraced by American society, and been nominated for, or won, many of the toys industry's most important awards, such as the TOTY (Toy of The Year), the TAGie (Toy and Game award) Games 100, Mensa Select, Origin, and Family Fun award.

== Career ==
Nuccio, the son of Mark and Linda Nuccio, was instrumental in helping create an international agency for toy inventing, design and manufacturing, with teams in New York, Hong Kong and Qingdao China. By the end of 2009, the company had grown from being a product design firm into a complete design, consulting and production resource for companies such as Mattel, Spin Master, Hasbro and Goliath. Many of the products he helped develop have since been nominated for, or won, many of the toys industry's top awards, such as TOTY (Toy of The Year), TAGIE (Toy and Games Innovators), Games 100, Origin, and Family Fun among others. .

== Peer Recognition ==
Nuccio also co-chaired the Toy Association (TA) associate panel representing designers and inventors in the toy industry. He currently sits on the Board of Directors of the United Inventors Association of America (UIA), People of Play (POP) advisory board and the education committee of the Toy Association (TA). He writes a column in Toy & Family Entertainment magazine focusing on the industry and he has lectured several times at New York Toy Fair, ASTRA, ChiTAG, Hong Kong Toy Fair and inventor organizations. In 2018, the National Security Agency (NSA) honored Nuccio as an American Innovator and in 2019 Matt was selected to represent the United States at the Emerging Innovation Summit in Melbourne, Australia. As of 2023, Nuccio has been recognized by MOJO NATION as one of the 100 Most Influential People working in the toy industry today for five years consecutively. In 2023, Matt was chosen by the United Nations to represent the US inventor community as an elected board member of the International Federation of Inventors' Associations (IFIA).
