= Susan Foster =

- Education: Columbia University, Gemological Institute of America
- Occupation: Jewelry Designer
- Website: susanfosterjewelry.com

Susan Foster is an American jewellery designer, philanthropist, and writer (supported by published work).

== Early life ==
Susan Foster was raised in East Hampton, New York. She grew up surrounded by artisans and with artistic relatives. Foster resided close to the homes of Jackson Pollock as well as Willem de Kooning, where she found creative inspiration. Foster's artistic surroundings framed her upbringing and were a big influence on her future career as a jewelry designer.

== Education ==
Foster studied in detail traditional jewelry design and creation with European goldsmiths. She further enhanced her knowledge by going to the esteemed Gemological Institute of America (GIA) and studied extensively diamonds, colored gemstones, synthetic gemstones, and pearl grading. Now she attends Columbia University.

== Career ==
Foster began her career as a jewelry designer in 1999 where her collection was soon featured on the covers of Mademoiselle, InStyle, Glamour, and Elle. At that time her collection was picked up by Neiman Marcus and Bergdorf Goodman. In 2008 Foster opened her exclusive, by-appointment-only boutique in Los Angeles, California.

In 2014, Foster relocated to New York City, opened her private Upper East side showroom, which was featured on the cover of New York Cottages & Gardens.[3] Her Fifth Avenue pied-a-terre, decorated in authentic and rare Art Deco furnishings, was her inspiration for her 2017 final collection [ https://cottagesgardens.com/tour-a-swanky-art-deco-pad-designed-by-interior-designer-nicole-fuller/ ]

New York's fashion elite celebrated Foster's 2014 arrival, and NY showroom, at The Carlyle Hotel, a party hosted by Indré Rockefeller and British Vogue's Fashion Features Director, Sarah Harris. The event was attended by Nell Diamond, model Jess Hart, Architectural Digest's Jane Keltner de Valle, Vogue’s Sarah Brown, and W Magazine’s Rickie De Sole, which was covered by W Magazine [ https://www.wmagazine.com/gallery/indre-rockefeller-sarah-harris-susan-foster-jewelry].

Susan Foster is currently a contributing writer for magazines I-M and Millionaire, with stories featured in The Purist, Cent, and Secret Trips. and Millionair Magazine. The Summer 2026 issue of I-M featured one of Foster’s most notable articles to date: From Shadow To Spotlight: Shawn Ryan And The Meaning Of Hero where she interviewed former CIA contractor and Navy Seal Shawn Ryan [ https://i-m-magazine.com/philanthropy/shawn-ryan-interview-heroism-child-safety/ ].

Foster's fine jewelry collection is available with select retailers worldwide including Just One Eye in Los Angeles, Fivestory in New York, as well as Harrods and Matches.com in the UK. Susan Foster's jewelry has been featured in top publications including Vogue, Harper's Bazaar, Tatler, Marie Claire, Elle and InStyle. Foster's designs have been worn by notable celebrities including Kate Bosworth, Kerry Washington, Mandy Moore, Sarah Harris, Kate Hudson, Zoe Saldaña and Mila Kunis. In 2016, Susan Foster's jewelry was auctioned off at Christie's for the private collection of President and Mrs. Ronald Reagan. In 2017, Foster was commissioned by Si Newhouse and the team at Conde Nast to custom create the retirement gift for long time powerhouse editor Alexandra Shulman. Ms. Shulman dedicated a page about Foster and her monogrammed retirement earrings in her best selling London Times autobiography, called “Clothes... and Other Things That Matter”.

In 2025, Foster collaborated with Celine Cousteau, the granddaughter of Jacques Cousteau, on a Cayman Island nature-inspired jewellery collection, Blu Lagartos [https://nationaltrust.org.ky/press-release-unique-cayman-nature-inspired-jewellery-collection-designed-by-celine-cousteau-and-susan-foster-released/ ]. The 12 piece limited edition collection pays homage to the islands’ endangered and protected flora and fauna, including the blue iguana [https://caymanindependent.com/new-jewellery-collection-celebrates-caymans-nature-and-heritage/ ]. All proceeds from the sales of the Blu Lagartos collection are donated to the National Trust for the Cayman Islands to support their environmental work [https://i-m-magazine.com/fashion/love-is-a-gem/ ].
