= Donny Brady =

American football player (born 1973)

No. 24
- Position: Cornerback

Personal information
- Born: November 24, 1973 (age 52); North Bellmore, New York, U.S.
- Listed height: 6 ft 2 in (1.88 m)
- Listed weight: 195 lb (88 kg)

Career information
- High school: Bellmore (NY) Mepham
- College: Wisconsin

Career history
- 1995: Saskatchewan Roughriders
- 1995: Cleveland Browns
- 1996–1998: Baltimore Ravens
- 2002–2006: Edmonton Eskimos

Awards and highlights
- 2× Grey Cup champion (2003, 2005); CFL All-Star (2003); 2× CFL West All-Star (2003, 2005)

Career CFL statistics
- Total tackles: 167
- Fumble recoveries: 1
- Pass deflections: 19
- Interceptions: 13
- Defensive touchdowns: 1
- Stats at CFL.ca (archived)
- Stats at Pro Football Reference

Donald Maynard Brady (born November 24, 1973) is an American former professional football player who was a cornerback in the National Football League (NFL) and Canadian Football League (CFL). He was signed by the Saskatchewan Roughriders as an undrafted free agent in 1995. He played college football for the Wisconsin Badgers. He also played high school football at Wellington C. Mepham High School.

Brady also played for the Cleveland Browns, Baltimore Ravens, and Edmonton Eskimos.
