= Wind-up Knight =

2011 video game

- Developer: Robot Invader
- Publisher: Robot Invader
- Platforms: iOS, Android
- Release: December 10, 2011

Wind-up Knight is an Android game developed by American studio Robot Invader and released on December 10, 2011. It was released on iOS later.

== Critical reception ==
The game has a Metacritic score of 86% based on 12 critic reviews.

The A.V. Club wrote "Wind-Up Knight is a beautiful, propulsive game whose difficulty only makes it that much more fulfilling." SlideToPlay said "Wind-Up Knight is a tough but rewarding running game with excellent production values." AppSpy wrote "While Android gamers have already had their fun with Wind-up Knight, iOS gamers finally get their chance to play around with the clockwork protagonist while proving their skill at overcoming numerous platforming hazards one-after-the-other." TouchArcade said "Though it can be extremely frustrating, it rewards the player who pushes through the painful parts. Each time you replay a level you'll learn more, memorize more, become better at the game. The rush you'll get when you finally reach the end of a challenging level is worth the trouble, every time." Multiplayer.it said "Wind-up Knight is an awesome action game, with an outstanding gameplay which is progressively enriched with new elements. A must buy." 148Apps said "Wind-Up Knight is a game I have no problem referring to as a "Must Play." It's perfect for short bursts or prolonged sessions. There's a surprising amount of customization. It can be accessible and brutally punishing, depending on what the player wants. This, my friends, is a perfect example of mobile gaming at its finest."

GameCritics wrote "This game is a perfect blend of well-rounded, bite-sized action that can be picked up and put down comfortably, yet was challenging enough to make me late for work while I had to try just one more level." Eurogamer Portugal said "Wind-up Knight is a game easily recommended for being something unique in the world of iOS and a great challenge." AppSmile wrote "Replay value is pretty good, as your results on each level take into account the number of coins you collected, whether or not you found the card, and a letter grade for your overall performance. " Pocket Gamer described the game as "A bafflingly overpraised auto-runner that looks good but soon becomes tiresome." Metrogamecenter said the game was "Punishingly hard for no good reason, turning what could have been a fun reaction-based platform game into a painful memory test."
