= Ultra High Frequency (band) =

US alternative rock group

Ultra High Frequency was a Long Island, New York based alternative rock band.

== History ==
Formed in 2001 by Frank Fussa (vocals / guitar), Jonny Brown (guitar / vocals), Chris Johanidesz (bass / vocals) and Dennis Joseph (drums / vocals), the band would go on to produce two LPs, two EPs and a number of singles.

In 2005 the band signed with White Elephant Recordings and their next full length Matter in Time (2006) was recorded at Laundry Room Studios in Seattle, Washington by producer/engineer Barrett Jones, known for his prior work with Nirvana and Foo Fighters. Upon its release the band toured the US, including notable dates with fellow Long Island bands Brand New and As Tall As Lions and would play one of the last shows at famed NYC club CBGB.

In 2007 the band relocated to Los Angeles to write for a new record and shift their focus to touring on the West Coast. While in California the band released the single 44 Mph, a slowed down version of their 2006 single 88 Mph and recorded a set of demos. After a Halloween show at the Viper Room the band announced it was their last show and they were breaking up. Frank and Chris have emerged with a new band called Morning Fuzz.

== Discography ==
Albums

- 2006 – Matter in Time
- 2004 – Sun Never Sets in Dramaville

Singles/EP

- 2007 – 44 Mph
- 2006 – 88 Mph - Need You Around - Takes Time
- 2003 – The Station Sound EP (limited release)

Compilation tracks

- Beer: The Movie 2 (2006) ("Back to Bacon" from 'Matter in Time')

Demos

- 2007 – California Garage Demos
- 2002 – Basement Tape II
- 2001 – Basement Tape
