= Laurence Traiger =

American composer (born 1956)

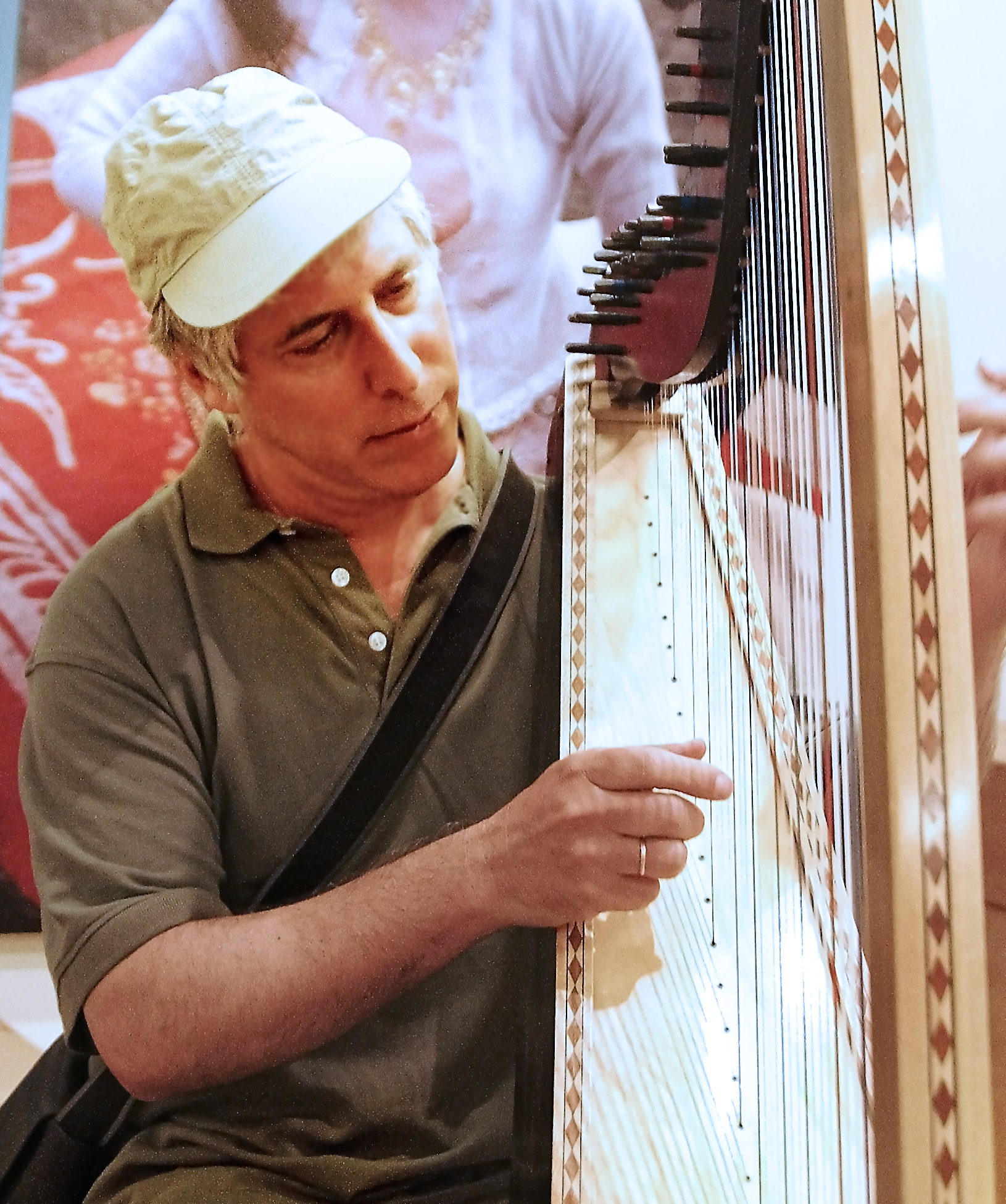
- Traiger playing the Peruvian harp in 2010
- Born: October 16, 1956
- Died: October 18, 2024 (aged 68)
- Occupation: Composer

Laurence Traiger (October 16, 1956 – October 18, 2024) was an American composer. Originally from Bellmore, Long Island, New York, he studied and worked in Europe since 1976.

== Life and career ==
At age 11 he composed duos for violin; at age 14 he took lessons in harmony, counterpoint and composition from his violin instructor, William Cosgriff, and at 16 had a work performed at the Hartt School of Music. In 1974 he graduated from John F. Kennedy High School (Bellmore, New York) where he studied under Barry A. Beeber and performed with the Long Island Youth Orchestra and the Long Island Holiday Festival Orchestra under Martin C. Dreiwitz. He received a scholarship from the University of Kansas, studying composition under Prof. John Pozdro. Leaving Kansas after his sophomore year, he moved to Europe. He first studied with Prof. Cesar Bresgen at the Mozarteum University of Salzburg, graduating in 1980. From 1980 to 1982 Traiger studied at the Conservatoire National in Paris with Ivo Malec. In 1982 he became a student in the master class of Wilhelm Killmayer at the Munich College of Music.

His list of works include chamber music, choral music, orchestral music, film music as well as compositions for educational works and historical instruments. Many of his works reflect an interest in Jewish mysticism. For didactic works he strives to provide something that the student could use as a vehicle for expression, attempting to capture the teenage disposition in a moody and thoughtful, yet energetic and optimistic tone. Traiger has received numerous commissions from renowned ensembles and radio choirs. Traiger has had many collaborations with the Mitteldeutscher Rundfunk Choir, including an invitation to compose a piece for Schumann-2010, honoring the 200th anniversary of Robert Schumann's birth. His work has appeared on MDR's CD "Das Hohelied Salomos." He has been described by Howard Arman as one of the few composers of music for Baroque instruments today.

Laurence Traiger taught at the Hochschule für Musik und Theater München and the Innsbruck branch of Mozarteum University of Salzburg. His areas of interest include music history, theory for music teachers, composition and arrangement, and vocal polyphony of the 16th Century. At the 2013 Internationale Sommerakademie Mozaertum, Traiger was featured in a Komponistenporträt (the presentation of a living composer in talk and music).

== Musical style ==
In 1986, Traiger "turned away from the 'avant-garde' and tried to find my own voice in tonality."

== Notable works ==
With Richard Voss, Traiger has written two tune book collections of Irish folk music, arranging the songs for piano solo in both. "Roving Through Ireland" is a collection of 38 traditional Irish ballads. "O'Carolan's Tunes for Piano" is a collection of 32 songs, originally for harp, by Turlough O'Carolan, 17th Century Irish harper. Voss and Traiger have three other tune book collaborations, including "Auf Den Spuren Der Inkas".

"According to Juliet" is a monodrama (in four scenes for soprano, flute and accordion) written by Traiger. Using excerpts from the original text of Arthur Brooke's Romeus and Juliet, written shortly before Shakespeare's birth, Traiger tells the beautiful but hopeless love story from Juliet's perspective. The work was premiered at the 2007 Black Forest Music Festival in Badenweiler; the Munich premiere of the libretto was 16 March 2010. Reviewer Bianca Flier reported that the interplay of the voice and instruments grips the audience until the dramatic finale, and that "the composer has created a moving and compelling, almost unearthly work."

"Aliyat" is a work for mezzo-soprano and orchestra. Based on mystical teachings of Judaism, the composition describes the journey of a disembodied soul through the various stages of life after death, as one imagines oneself in the mystical tradition of Kabbalah.

Laurence Traiger at premiere of his composition honoring Nelson Mandeta's 100th birthday in 2018

Traiger wrote the cantata, "Be Still," in memory of the 9/11/2001 tragedy. Commissioned by the Orpheus Choir of Munich, Joel Frederiksen was the narrator/bass soloist for the 30 June 2002 premiere, at the Europäischen Wochen, Passau. The OCM has long collaborated with Traiger, and premiered many of his works. Traiger and Frederiksen have other collaborations, most recently their work honoring Baroque architect Domenico Martinelli. For "Project Martinelli," Traiger was commissioned, and wrote a Baroque piece for arciliuto, theorbo and soprano based upon text by Frank Lloyd Wright.

"Prayer Without Words" has been widely played piece, with three concerts at the Scharzwald Festival in 2006, as well as at the International Festival of Sacred Choral Music in Rottenburg am Neckar 2008.

"Nach Im Schlaf" was written in 1998 for the Mitteldeutscher Rundfunk Chor; a 12-part composition, it is based on text from the Song of Songs. It was performed by the Norddeutscher Rundfunk Chor at the opening of its 2012–2013 season. His 2015 piece for the choir, "Till This Night," uses the famous monologue from Shakespeare's "Romeo and Juliet" in which Romeo says of his mistress: "Swear it, my eye; before this happy night not you know what beauty is."

In 2014, Traiger wrote the music for the award-winning documentary movie "Fukushima Nichts Ist Wie Es War."

On the 2018 occasion of Nelson Mandela's 100th birthday, Traiger created RheinMain Ode to Mandela, a work for speakers, two choirs, instrumental ensemble, percussion and organ commissioned by the Vocal Art Frankfurt Festival.
