= Peter Ragone =

American entrepreneur and investor

Personal details
- Born: Peter Ragone III
- Party: Democratic
- Education: University at Albany (BA)

Peter Ragone III is an American public affairs expert, entrepreneur and investor active in a range of political, corporate and civic efforts. Since 2007 (with a break during his tenure as Senior Advisor to the Mayor of New York City), Ragone has started, advised and invested in companies.

In 2011, Ragone founded Exiles, Inc., a company devoted to organizing online clubs for sports fans that live outside the home market of their favorite teams.

Ragone has served in advisory roles for a range of local, state and national political figures including United States Vice-president Al Gore, Andrew Cuomo, Governor of New York State and California Lieutenant Governor Gavin Newsom. From January 2013 to March 2014, Ragone served as Senior Adviser for Strategic Planning for New York Mayor de Blasio.

== Early life and career ==
Originally from Merrick, New York, Ragone had an early passion for politics. In high school, he subscribed to The New York Times and The Wall Street Journal and started the Political Awareness Club.

Ragone attended State University of New York at Albany where he studied political science, history and Italian. Just after college, Ragone served as president of the New York State Young Democrats. He got his start in Democratic politics by recruiting young voters on behalf of Jerry Jennings, alderman who was running for Mayor of Albany. Jennings continues to serve as Mayor.

When Ragone graduated in 1993, Jennings offered to put him on his campaign payroll, but Ragone resisted. In a 2000 interview with The New York Observer, Ragone said “I didn’t think that I should take money to do something that I believed in.” Later Ragone went to work for the New York State Democratic Party early in the tenure of state chairwoman Judith Hope.

== National and state politics ==
Though Ragone was unqualified, by his own account, to serve as a national campaign’s press officer, the Clinton-Gore coordinated campaign in 1996 selected him for the job. It was during the re-election campaign that Ragone met now New York Mayor-elect Bill de Blasio who called Ragone "energetic, idealistic, willing to do anything...He was extremely persistent." According to a profile in the San Francisco Chronicle, Ragone considers de Blasio one of his mentors.

The New York Observer wrote Ragone secured the position due to his “work-for-nothing gene.” Because the New York primary was uncontested, the campaign didn't want to spend significant money in the state. Thus the young Ragone was as a perfect fit for the role. After the campaign, Ragone briefly worked for public relations executive Ken Sunshine before signing on for the gubernatorial campaign of City Council Speaker Peter Vallone.

Within days of Vallone’s loss, Ragone was hired to work for HUD Secretary Andrew Cuomo, who described Ragone as "deeply committed to social justice." Cuomo also remarked, “sometimes pros in politics become part of a business and lose the advocation" and that "Peter is principle first.” In total, Ragone worked at HUD for nine months, before leaving to join Hillary Rodham Clinton’s campaign for New York Senate.

After his brief stint with the Clinton Senate campaign, Ragone began work with Al Gore’s campaign for president. In his role as press secretary, Ragone directed press strategy in New York and California. Whenever the Vice President visited New York during this primary against Bill Bradley, Ragone was one of the handful of people who briefed Gore daily. In 2002, Ragone returned to Cuomo’s side for his unsuccessful attempt at the New York State governorship. Ragone also served as chief spokesman for Andrew Cuomo in his 2002 run for New York governor. Cuomo chose Ragone for this role after he worked as Cuomo’s national press office director during his tenure as Housing and Urban Development (HUD) Secretary under the Clinton administration. Ragone also served on former Governor Mario Cuomo’s campaign for reelection in 1994. In 2003, Ragone served as Communications Director for the Governor of California before assuming the role of spokesman for California’s Against Costly Recall, Governor Gray Davis’ campaign attempt to defeat the recall election. Ragone also briefly served on Hillary Rodham Clinton’s first campaign for Senate and got his start in national politics during the Clinton-Gore coordinated presidential campaign in 1996.

In 2008, Ragone served in a volunteer communications role with Senator Hillary Clinton's campaign for President - working in California, Texas and North Carolina.

In 2014, Ragone was named Senior Adviser for Strategic Planning for New York Mayor de Blasio.

== San Francisco Mayor Gavin Newsom ==
Ragone played a crucial role in crafting then-San Francisco Mayor Gavin Newsom major policy issues on topics such as same-sex marriage, universal healthcare and homelessness. In Gavin Newsom's campaign for mayor in 2003, Ragone—who lives in San Francisco and had met Newsom before—began to volunteer on the campaign.

Starting in January 2004, Ragone served as Newsom's press secretary and his most influential aide and friend. Sam Singer, a public relations consultant, said of Ragone: "He was able to take a newly elected mayor and help position the mayor's administration in a Kennedy-like manner that created an image of a new Camelot. It's very hard to find a communications director of Ragone's ability who can create large-scale imagery."

Ragone played a major role in Newsom’s decision to marry same sex couples in City Hall. According to sources quoted by the San Francisco Chronicle, Ragone was one of a small group of government advisors that supported Newsom’s marriage decision. After Newsom announced his plans to issue marriage licenses to same-sex couples, hundreds flooded City Hall with requests to marry, earning the young mayor and his staff national media attention.

In 2007, Ragone sparked controversy after admitting he posted, under a pseudonym, positive messages online about Newsom while belittling the mayor's detractors. In 2008, Ragone assisted Newsom in his campaign for Lieutenant Governor of California. He currently serves as a senior advisor to Newsom.

== Committee & board memberships ==
Ragone is a member of the California Democratic Party’s finance committee and served on the party Executive Committee.

In 2010, Ragone was named Vice Chair of the Board of the San Francisco America’s Cup Organizing Committee, an organization focused on the 2013 America’s Cup sailing races being held on the San Francisco Bay. He serves along with Hollywood mogul Steve Bing, Tom Perkins, a Silicon Valley venture capitalist, and George Shultz.

Ragone was also a member of the Board of Directors of the Tahoe Winter Olympic Games Committee, an organization devoted to bringing the Winter Olympics to the Greater Tahoe area in 2022.

Ragone was also a member of the board of directors of ChinaSF, a business organization committed to the development of ties between private companies in San Francisco and China. In 2010, Ragone served on the steering committee for the effort that created the San Francisco Bay Citizen, a nonprofit news organization dedicated to quality journalism in the Bay Area.

Ragone, along with GOP consultant Matt Mackowiak and Darius Fisher, launched the UFO Political Action Committee, or UFOPac, in 2021. The committee claims that it is dedicated to persuading the U.S. government to “disclose, declassify, and demystify all information related to UFOs.”

== Personal ==
Ragone lives in San Francisco with his two children. He currently runs PWR LLC, a private sector public affairs consultancy and Exiles Inc, a tech start up that organizes online sports fan clubs dedicated to the out of market fan experience. He enjoys surfing in Pacifica and Santa Cruz and snowboarding at Lake Tahoe on the weekends.

== Exiles Inc. ==
Exiles Inc. is a company that creates social networking communities for out-of-market sports fans. Ragone currently serves as the co-founder and president of the company. The community has been categorized as a global diaspora social network as it allows expatriated individuals to connect with their homeland sports team. The first community the company created targets Yankees fans and is called Yanks In Exile. The company's investors and advisors include Typekit co-founder Bryan Mason, as well as Hugh Evans of 3D Systems.
