= CheapyD =

Editor and owner of Cheap Ass Gamer

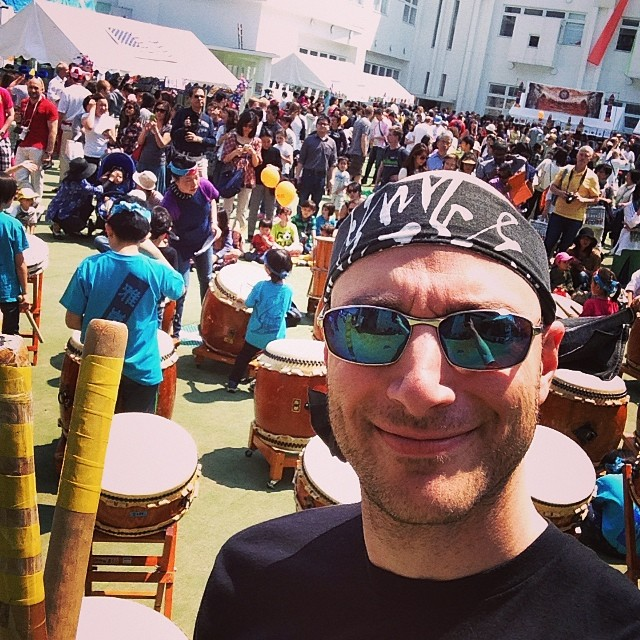
Cheapy at a taiko event, 2014

David Abrams, known as CheapyD, runs Cheap Ass Gamer. He is also known for his charity work through the website and for winning a charity auction to feature his likeness in the video game Saints Row: The Third.

== Cheap Ass Gamer ==
Cheapy is the editor and owner of Cheap Ass Gamer (CAG), a website initially based in Tokyo, Japan. The website brought him "a kind of cult fame in the gaming world" as he hosts a "popular podcast" and makes cameos at gaming trade shows. Nintendo used his face in one such trade show's Nintendo DS press conference presentation. Cheapy noted that his popularity draws from the website and not vice versa—that most CAG visitors come for the savings. He felt that living in Tokyo gave him a time advantage for posting United States-based video game deals. Cheapy runs the website full-time.

The website began to raise money from its members for the Child's Play charity, as Cheapy was impressed by its founders' efforts, supported their effort to help children and change the negative media portrayal of gamers, and wanted to join their initiative. The website raised over $75,000 for the charity in five years.

After downloading this DLC, you'll be able to call me up on your cell and have me shoot people in the face for you.

— Cheapy, quoted in Kotaku

In August 2010, Cheapy participated in a charity auction for a voice acting role in the then-upcoming video game Saints Row: The Third. The contest was held by Saints Row senior writer Steve Jaros, who wanted to help the family of a 23-year-old fire victim pay medical bills. Cheapy had a previous interest in gaming-related charities. His voice role includes about 200 in-game lines and various asides, such as "screaming like he's been shot". The developer, Volition, later decided to expand his role from a random non-playable character to a full computer-controlled support character ("homie"). Cheapy's in-game character downloadable content modeled on his likeness was made available for free. He felt honored to be included, even if he "bought [his] way in".

He lives in the United States, as of late 2014.
