= Cheap Ass Gamer =

Online bulletin board system community

- Website type: Bargain hunting website
- Owners: CAG Productions, LLC
- Creator: David Abrams
- Website: www.cheapassgamer.com
- Commercial: Yes
- Registration: Free
- Launched: May 2003

Cheap Ass Gamer is an online bulletin board system community which focuses on video game deals. The site was founded in May 2003 by David Abrams, who uses the pseudonym "CheapyD" on the forums.

Cheap Ass Gamer has over 700,000 visitors per month and serves over 10 million pages. Cheap Ass Gamer is heavily dependent on user-submitted deals.

== Podcasts ==
Cheap Ass Gamer has been host to two video game podcasts, the CAGcast, and CAG Foreplay, but the latter is on permanent hiatus. The CAGcast won the Podcast Awards Gaming category in 2007, was a finalist in the Gaming and People's Choice categories in 2008 and 2009, and was a finalist in MCV's Games Media Awards podcast category in 2007. The CAGcast is consistently listed in iTunes Top 25 Video Game Podcasts.

== Lawsuit ==
In July 2007, a user with the avatar "speedy1961" posted information from an upcoming Circuit City Sunday newspaper ad flyer revealing a $100 PlayStation 3 price drop. Weeks later, Circuit City subpoenaed CAG Productions, LLC in an effort to obtain speedy1961's identity. To fight Circuit City, Cheap Ass Gamer hired an attorney and filed an objection and motion to quash the subpoena. In February 2009, after declaring bankruptcy, Circuit City filed an order of nonsuit, ending the matter, keeping speedy1961's identity a secret.

== Charity ==
Cheap Ass Gamer runs community raffles which raise money for the Child's Play charity. In 2012, Cheap Ass Gamer raised $38,400, bringing the total amount raised since 2004 to $256,140. In 2009, Cheap Ass Gamer raised over $5,000 for the Extra Life Charity. In 2011, Cheap Ass Gamer raised over $24,000 for Japan tsunami/earthquake relief.

From November 2017 through January 2018, Cheap Ass Gamer raised over $19,000 for Puerto Rico storm relief.

== See also ==
- Jay Is Games
- Video Games Chronicle
