= Wellington C. Mepham High School =

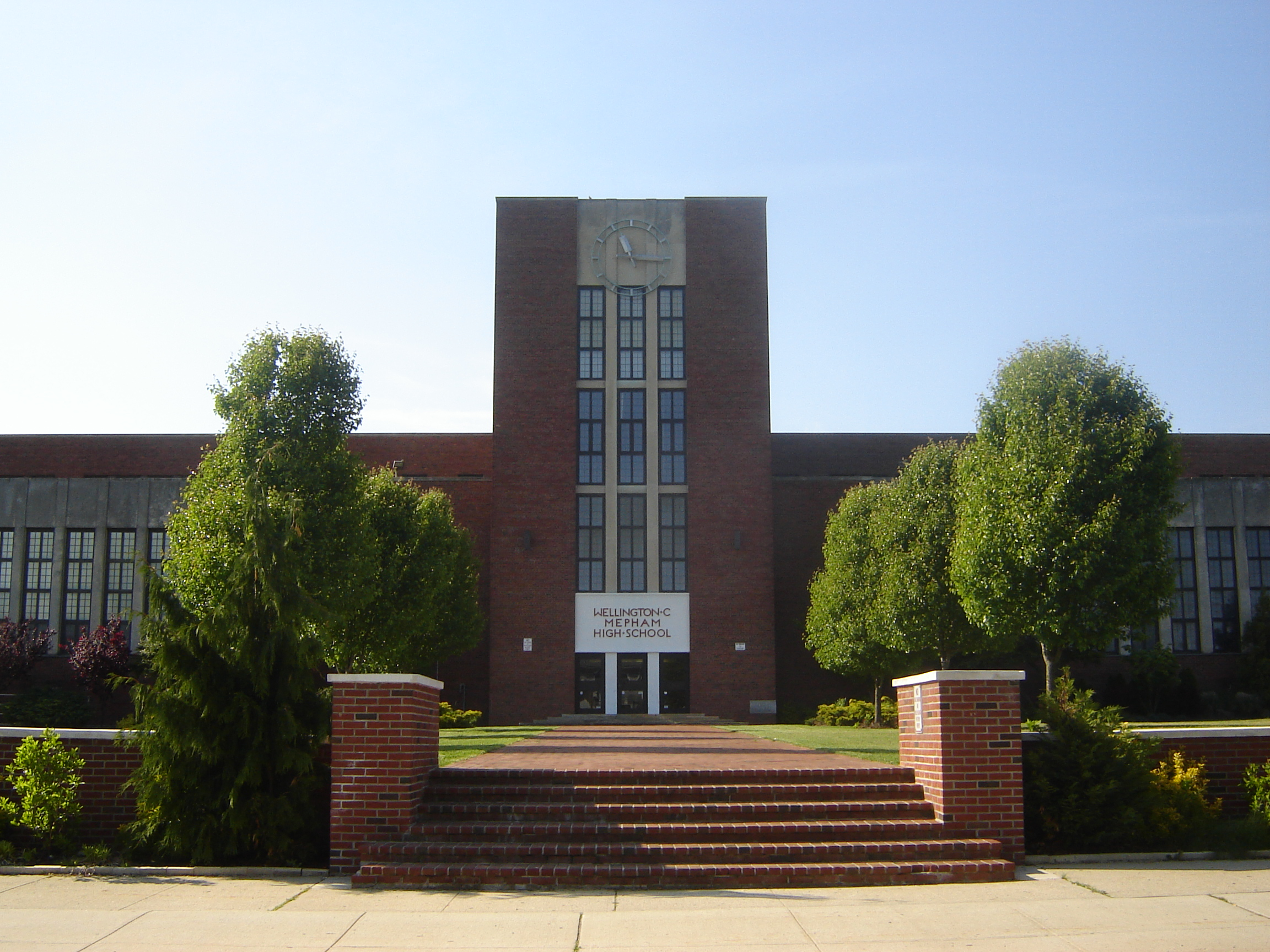

Location
- 2401 Camp Ave; Bellmore, New York 11710; United States; 40°40′34″N 73°32′36″W

Information
- Type: Public
- School district: Bellmore-Merrick Central High School District
- NCES School ID: 361902001725
- Principal: Anthony DeMartinis
- Teaching staff: 108.19 (on an FTE basis)
- Grades: 9-12
- Enrollment: 1,191 (2023-2024)
- Student to teacher ratio: 11.01
- Campus: Suburban: Large
- Colors: Garnet and Gray
- Mascot: Pirates
- Website: www.bellmore-merrick.k12.ny.us/wellington-c-mepham-high-school-hom

Wellington C. Mepham High School is a public high school located on a 21-acre (85,000 m^{2}) campus in North Bellmore, New York. It is the oldest of three high schools in the Bellmore–Merrick Central High School District. The school is known locally as "Mepham" (pronounced MEP-um), and was named in honor of the first school superintendent in the district.

As of the 2018–19 school year, the school had an enrollment of 1,241 students and 83.3 classroom teachers (on an FTE basis), for a student–teacher ratio of 14.9:1. There were 146 students (11.8% of enrollment) eligible for free lunch and 26 (2.1% of students) eligible for reduced-cost lunch.

== History ==
=== Founding and the building's design ===
The first iteration of the school began operations in 1935, being housed in a wooden, six-room building located on Bedford Avenue in Bellmore, New York. At this time, there were 150 students, six teachers, and the school's first principal, Sanford H. Calhoun. The school then moved to its current location on Camp Avenue, opening its doors on September 8, 1937 to 741 students.

The new building was designed by Valley Stream, New York-based architect Frederic P. Wiedersum of Frederic P. Wiedersum Associates. The school's design is notable partly because of its foyer, which features high ceilings and marble columns. The school was recognized as one of the first contemporary high schools in North America because of its design.

=== Long Island map mural ===
Mepham hosts what is believed to be the world's largest painted map of Long Island, New York in its auditorium. The map was created in 1937 and is an oil-paint mural which covers a 16 x 80 foot section of one of the room's walls. It is believed that the map was painted by the Rambusch Decorating Company for the Waldorf Astoria Hotel in New York City. The first iteration of the map highlighted the island's country clubs and golf courses, but it was repainted to instead showcase Long Island's towns and airfields when it was relocated to Mepham in 1937 or 1938. Written across the bottom of the map is the quote “The virtue lies in the struggle not the prize” of British poet Richard Monckton Milnes. The mural was restored by Jonathan Sherman of Sherman Art Conservation in 2007.

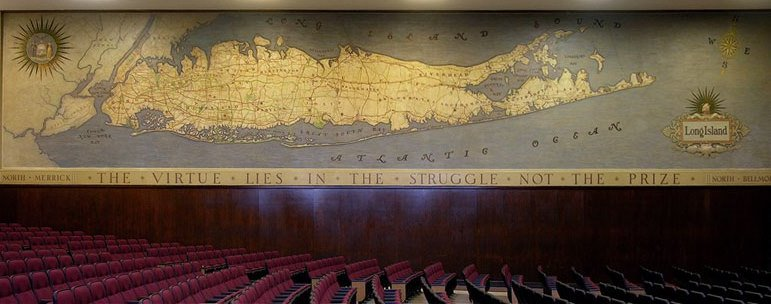
The Mepham High School Long Island Map Mural, as restored by Sherman Art Conservation

=== Sports ===
In 2021, school football player Sofia LaSpina became the first female varsity high school football player on Long Island to score a touchdown.

==== 2003 hazing sexual assault incident ====
In May 2003, it was reported that, while at a football training camp, at least three members of the Mepham football team were sexually assaulted by their teammates. Three members admitted to the acts, two of whom appeared in court. The sexual assault included anally penetrating the boys with foreign objects, including broom handles, pine cones, and golf balls. The team's season was canceled early, and two coaches were transferred to administrative positions.

On October 27, 2003, members of the Westboro Baptist Church from Topeka, Kansas staged an anti-gay rally outside the school. Led by the church‘s head spokesperson Shirley Phelps-Roper, the protestors blamed the hazing incident on the fact that parents and school administrators had allowed the formation of Mepham’s Gay-Straight Alliance (GSA) three years prior.

== Notable alumni ==
- Roone Arledge – American sports and news broadcasting executive (1931–2002)
- Mark Belger – American middle-distance runner
- Dean Blandino – sportscaster
- Donny Brady – American football player (born 1973)
- Lenny Bruce – American comedian and social critic (1925–1966)
- Tyler Davis – American football player (born 1997)
- Storm Field – American television meteorologist
- Jon Gabrus – American actor and comedian
- Thomas J. Kelly – American aerospace engineer (1929–2002)
- Amos Zereoué – Ivorian gridiron football player (born 1976)
- Eric Chester – Author, socialist political activist, and former economics professor
- Jason Foley – Professional baseball player
- Lester Prosper - Professional basketball player
- Carl Strommen - Music composer
- Yung Fazo - American rapper
