= Merrick, New York =

- Hamlet and census-designated place
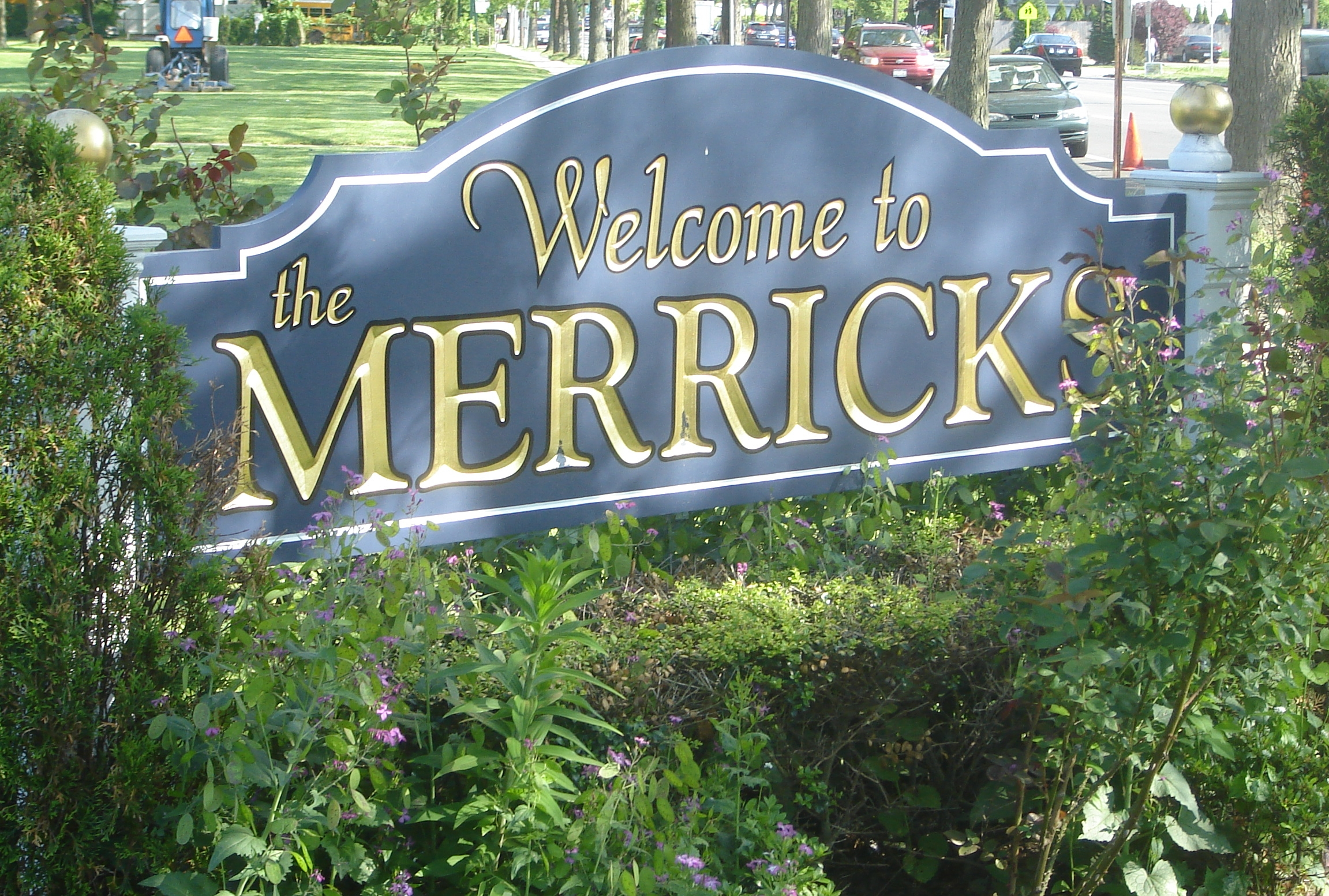

- Location in Nassau County and the state of New York.

- Location within the state of New York Merrick, New York (New York) Merrick, New York (the United States)
- Coordinates: 40°39′34″N 73°33′13″W
- Country: United States
- State: New York
- County: Nassau County, New York
- Town: Hempstead

Area
  - Total: 5.15 sq mi (13.34 km^{2})
  - Land: 3.98 sq mi (10.31 km^{2})
  - Water: 1.17 sq mi (3.03 km^{2})
- Elevation: 13 ft (4 m)

Population (2020)
  - Total: 22,040
  - Density: 5,535.9/sq mi (2,137.42/km^{2})
- Demonym: Merokian
- Time zone: UTC-5 (Eastern (EST))
  - Summer (DST): UTC-4 (EDT)
- ZIP code: 11566
- Area code: 516
- FIPS code: 36-46668
- GNIS feature ID: 0956989
- Website: merrickchamber.com

Merrick is a hamlet and census-designated place (CDP) in the Town of Hempstead in Nassau County, on the South Shore of Long Island, in New York, United States. As of the 2020 census, Merrick had a population of 22,040.

== Geography ==
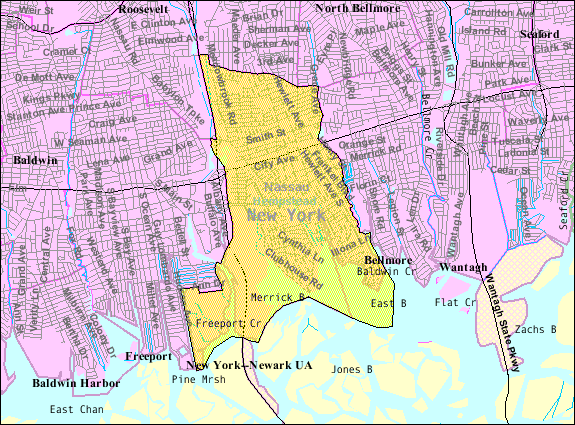
U.S. Census map of Merrick.

According to the United States Census Bureau, the CDP has a total area of 5.2 square miles (13 km^{2}), of which 4.2 square miles (11 km^{2}) is land and 1.0 square mile (2.6 km^{2}), or 19.27%, is water.

Merrick has a climate that is bordering upon hot-summer humid continental (Dfa) and humid subtropical (Cfa). The Cfa zone is found along Merrick's coast. The average monthly temperatures in the town centre range from 31.7 °F in January to 74.8 °F in July. The local hardiness zone is 7b.

== Demographics ==
Historical population
Census	Pop.	Note	%±
2020	22,040		—
U.S. Decennial Census

=== 2020 census ===
As of the 2020 census, Merrick had a population of 22,040. The median age was 43.7 years. 22.2% of residents were under the age of 18 and 18.8% of residents were 65 years of age or older. For every 100 females there were 93.7 males, and for every 100 females age 18 and over there were 91.0 males age 18 and over.

100.0% of residents lived in urban areas, while 0.0% lived in rural areas.

There were 7,436 households in Merrick, of which 36.4% had children under the age of 18 living in them. Of all households, 70.5% were married-couple households, 8.4% were households with a male householder and no spouse or partner present, and 18.1% were households with a female householder and no spouse or partner present. About 13.4% of all households were made up of individuals and 8.2% had someone living alone who was 65 years of age or older.

There were 7,672 housing units, of which 3.1% were vacant. The homeowner vacancy rate was 0.8% and the rental vacancy rate was 4.3%.

Racial composition as of the 2020 census
Race	Number	Percent
White	18,664	84.7%
Black or African American	362	1.6%
American Indian and Alaska Native	17	0.1%
Asian	939	4.3%
Native Hawaiian and Other Pacific Islander	1	0.0%
Some other race	688	3.1%
Two or more races	1,369	6.2%
Hispanic or Latino (of any race)	2,066	9.4%

=== 2000 census ===
As of the census of 2000, there were 22,764 people, 7,524 households, and 6,478 families residing in the CDP. The population density was 5,423.3 inhabitants per square mile (2,093.9/km^{2}). There were 7,602 housing units at an average density of 1,811.1 per square mile (699.3/km^{2}). The racial makeup of the CDP was 95.18% White, 0.56% African American, 0.10% Native American, 2.24% Asian, 0.01% Pacific Islander, 0.94% from other races, and 0.98% from two or more races.

There were 7,524 households, out of which 42.9% had children under the age of 18 living with them, 76.0% were married couples living together, 7.6% had a female householder with no husband present, and 13.9% were non-families. 11.6% of all households were made up of individuals, and 6.6% had someone living alone who was 65 years of age or older. The average household size was 3.02 and the average family size was 3.27.

In the CDP, the population was spread out, with 27.5% under the age of 18, 5.4% from 18 to 24, 27.7% from 25 to 44, 26.7% from 45 to 64, and 12.7% who were 65 years of age or older. The median age was 40 years. For every 100 females, there were 93.2 males. For every 100 females age 18 and over, there were 90.8 males.

The median income for a household in the CDP was $93,132, and the median income for a family was $99,589. (According to a 2007 estimate, these values had risen to $111,536 and $122,319 respectively.) Males had a median income of $79,607 versus $41,618 for females. The per capita income for the CDP was $26,334. About 2.0% of families and 2.8% of the population were below the poverty line, including 3.6% of those under age 18 and 2.2% of those age 65 or over.

== Education ==
=== School districts ===
Merrick is served by the Merrick and North Merrick Union Free School Districts for elementary education, and by the Bellmore–Merrick Central High School District for secondary education.

== Transportation ==
Merrick is served by the Merrick station on the Long Island Rail Road on the Babylon Branch.

== Notable people ==
Ed Begley Jr.

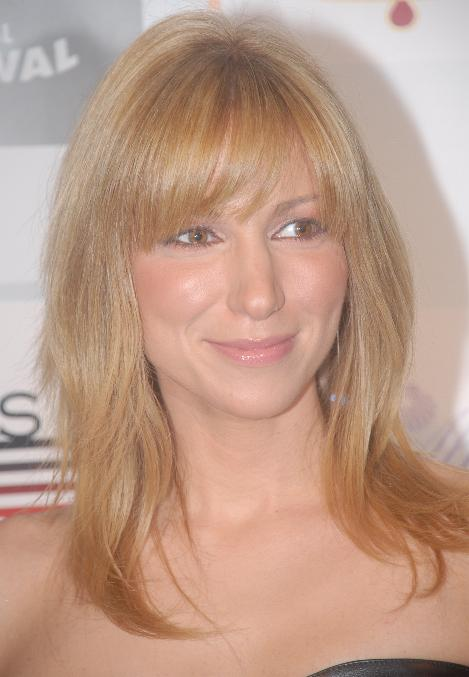
Debbie Gibson

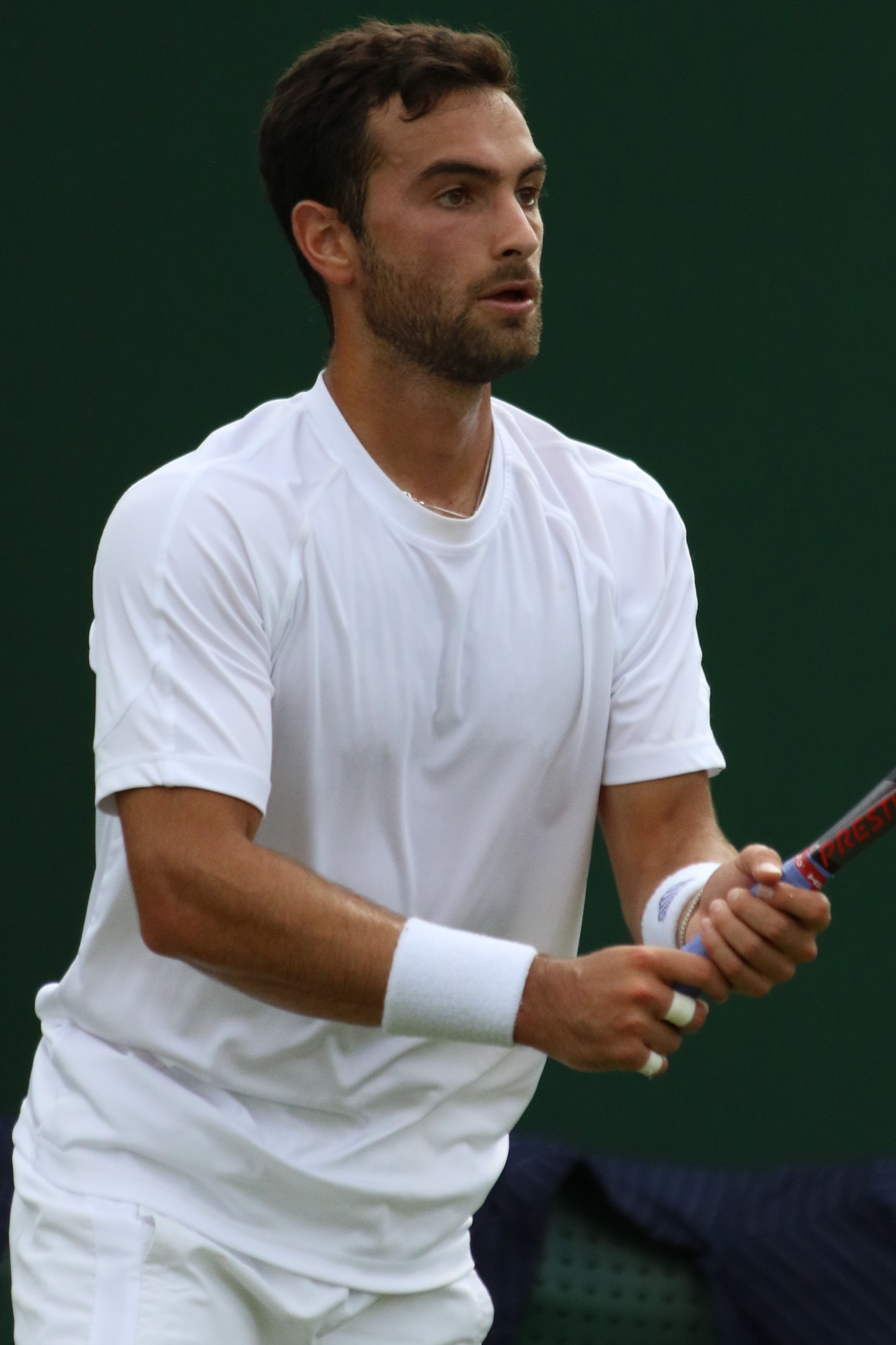
Noah Rubin

- Joshua Brown (writer) CEO Ritholtz Wealth Management, author, columnist, blogger, commentator on CNBC.
- Craig Allen, Fox News weatherman
- Roone Arledge, former president of ABC Sports/News
- Frank Bartkus, soccer player
- Justin Beck, guitarist in the band Glassjaw
- Melissa Howard Beck, cast member, The Real World New Orleans
- Ed Begley, actor
- Ed Begley Jr., actor
- Janet Billig, record executive, Broadway producer
- Brian Bloom, actor
- Schuyler V. Cammann, professor of Oriental Studies, University of Pennsylvania
- Matt Cardona, WWE professional wrestler, former WWE Intercontinental Champion and WWE United States Champion, WWE Tag Team Champion
- Vinnie Caruana, lead singer of I Am the Avalanche and The Movielife
- Leonard Chang, author
- CheapyD, owner of Cheap Ass Gamer
- Ben Cohen, co-founder of Ben and Jerry's ice cream
- Doreen Cronin, children's author
- Doug Ellin, writer/creator of Entourage
- Paul Feinman (1960–2021), associate judge of the New York Court of Appeals
- Amy Fisher, the "Long Island Lolita"
- Frank Frazetta, fantasy artist
- Bill Freiberger, Emmy-nominated writer/producer of The Simpsons, The PJs
- Debbie Gibson, singer
- Jerry Greenfield, co-founder of Ben and Jerry's ice cream
- Ryan Hunter, lead vocalist of the band Envy On The Coast
- Danny Kopec, international chess master
- Michael Kors, fashion designer
- Paul R. Krugman, 2008 Nobel Prize in Economics, New York Times columnist, professor and scholar
- Scott Lipsky (born 1981), tennis player
- The Lohan family, including Lindsay, Michael Jr., Ali, Dakota and Dina Lohan
- Elliot S. Maggin, writer
- Romeo Muller, screenplay writer of Santa Claus Is Coming to Town, Frosty the Snowman, Little Drummer Boy
- Matthew Nuccio, toy designer
- Constantinos Philippou, mixed martial artist
- Mario Puzo, author of the novel The Godfather (later adapted to film by Francis Ford Coppola)
- Peter Ragone, public affairs expert and entrepreneur
- Steve Rifkind, hip hop entrepreneur
- Robbie Rosen, singer, contestant on season 10 of American Idol
- Noah Rubin (born 1996), tennis player
- Sha Na Na (George and Rob Leonard), Woodstock festival, Grease album rock group
- Kevin Shinick, Emmy-winning writer, best-selling author, notably Robot Chicken and Star Wars Force Collector, in which he named a planet "Merokia" after his hometown. Was the host of the PBS game show Where in Time is Carmen Sandiego?
- James Siegel, author of Derailed, adapted to a film starring Jennifer Aniston and Clive Owen
- Lou Silver, American-Israeli basketball player
- Marc Slutsky, musician
- Bruce Sussman, songwriter

== In popular culture ==
=== Films ===
- 2002 – Blue Vinyl (dir. Daniel B. Gold and Judith Helfand)

=== Television ===
- 1996 - 2005 – Everybody Loves Raymond – The homes used for the exterior shots for Frank and Marie's residence and Raymond and Debra Barone's residence in the show are located within the hamlet, at 136 and 135 Margaret Boulevard, respectively.

== See also ==
- Norman Levy Park and Preserve
