= Our Color Green (The Singles) =

- Digital cover art

EP (compilation) by Glassjaw
- Released: January 1, 2011
- Recorded: 2005–2009
- Genre: Post-hardcore
- Length: 21:42
- Label: Self-released
- Producers: Glassjaw, Jonathan Florencio

Glassjaw chronology
El Mark (2005)	Our Color Green (The Singles) (2011)	Coloring Book (2011)

Our Color Green (The Singles) is the third extended play by the American post-hardcore band Glassjaw, self-released on January 1, 2011. The EP compiles five singles that were previously released throughout the later part of 2010. Our Color Green (The Singles) is the first release from Glassjaw since the 2005 B-sides EP El Mark, and first release of original material since the 2002 studio album Worship and Tribute. It is also the first release by the band as a four-piece, without Todd Weinstock.

== Background ==
Following the tours in support of their 2002 studio album Worship and Tribute, Glassjaw went on hiatus for a few years. The hiatus was brought about for several reasons including high stress derived from touring, personal differences among band members, and vocalist Daryl Palumbo's struggles with Crohn's disease. Palumbo was also beginning to write softer music that didn't fit Glassjaw's style, and started the dance-punk side project Head Automatica in 2004.

During this time it was believed that Glassjaw had quietly broken up due to an extended period of inactivity, however in 2005 the band reformed and started writing and playing a handful of concerts. Along with Palumbo, Glassjaw reformed with former members Justin Beck on guitars, Manuel Carrero on bass guitar and founding drummer Durijah Lang. Guitarist Todd Weinstock, bassist Dave Allen and drummer Larry Gorman, who were all a part of Glassjaw prior to the hiatus, had joined other projects and did not return. Weinstock started the electropop group Men, Women & Children, and Gorman had joined Head Automatica with Palumbo.

From 2005 to 2010, Glassjaw hinted and teased at the release of new material. Due to the long delay, the project was often compared to Chinese Democracy. This was a humorous reference to the Guns N' Roses album that also saw a significant delay in its release. In 2005, Glassjaw released the digital-only EP El Mark featuring previously unreleased songs from the Worship and Tribute sessions. In 2006, the band had a few songs written and planned on completing a new album for a 2007 release, but the album failed to materialize. A demo recording of "You Think You're (John Fucking Lennon)" was posted on their website in December 2008. In June 2009, Palumbo posted a Twitter update that he was currently listening to a new Glassjaw EP in his car with Justin Beck. After years of teasing the release of new material, the Twitter update was thought to be a joke. However, Palumbo later confirmed that a "five or six song EP" was completed, and there was a full-length Glassjaw album in the works as well.

== Writing and recording ==
Glassjaw started crafting new songs after reforming with a new lineup, and by July 2005 they had three songs written; the only one of which that had a title at this point was "Natural Born Farmer." By their 2006 tour with Deftones, the other two songs became titled "You Think You're (John Fucking Lennon)" and "Jesus Glue." Also written around this time was a new version of "Star Above My Bed (Call of the Tiger Woman)," originally released on the 1997 EP Kiss Kiss Bang Bang, titled "Stars." Primary songwriter Justin Beck admitted that he enjoyed writing new material with no working deadline and that he was selfishly writing new songs "with no one in mind." By the end of 2007, Glassjaw had two rough batches of songs recorded: one that was described as being "far more aggressive" than previous Glassjaw albums, and another grouping of instrumental songs that had a "Spanish and Latin" vibe to them. The more aggressive songs became the tracks for the Our Color Green (The Singles) EP, while the rest are expected to be released as an eventual full-length release. The EP was finished in June 2009.

Our Color Green (The Singles) is Glassjaw's first major release since 1997's Kiss Kiss Bang Bang that wasn't produced by Ross Robinson, who had recorded their previous two studio albums: Worship and Tribute and Everything You Ever Wanted to Know About Silence. Robinson was also producer for the songs on the El Mark EP. Instead, this new batch of songs was recorded by Glassjaw themselves and producer Jonathan Florencio.

== Release ==
In July 2010, Glassjaw mailed out blank cardboard postcards to the fans on their mailing list. The postcards contained no words or writing outside of the address and postage, only a cut-out of the group's "GJ" logo. The cutout logo was later discovered to be a uniquely shaped vinyl adapter. Typical vinyl records have a small hole that fits onto the spindle of the standard turntable. An unusually shaped hole in the center of a record requires a complementary shape in order to center the record on the spindle for the music to play correctly, and to prevent potentially damaging the equipment.

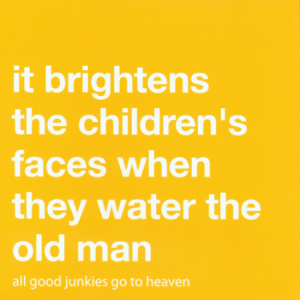
The cover art for the "All Good Junkies Go to Heaven" single. Each single in this series displays the song title and a lyric with a solid color background.

Shortly after the postcard was sent out, Glassjaw simultaneously performed a concert in the United Kingdom and also released a 7" vinyl single for the song "All Good Junkies Go to Heaven" on August 8, 2010. This single had a GJ shaped diecut hole and was given the catalog number 88, which continues with the band's interest in this value. Daryl Palumbo has had an obsession with the number eight since the formation of the band and has been a reoccurring theme in the band's merchandise.

Following the release of "All Good Junkies Go to Heaven," Glassjaw released one new 7" single per month that corresponded with a concert throughout the remainder of 2010 without announcement or promotion. Each song was released digitally in a low quality format for free in exchange for a Facebook or Twitter post promoting the band, or sold in a high quality format, on the day the following single was released. Each single was also released when the number for the month the year, and the number for the day of the month were the same value (i.e. 8/8/2010, 9/9/2010, etc.). The single for "Jesus Glue" was released on September 9, "Natural Born Farmer" was released on October 10, "Stars" was released on November 11, and "You Think You're (John Fucking Lennon)" was released on December 12.

The release for the "Stars" single was especially unique. Interested fans were required to visit Mario's Pizzeria in Seaford, New York at 1:11pm on 11/11/2010 and order "The Glassjaw" for $11.11. Inside a special box contained a personal-pizza and the "Stars" 7" vinyl, and the first 88 recipients were also given an invitation to a secret event at 11:11pm at an unknown address printed on the box. The location of the event turned out to be the headquarters for MerchDirect.com, a band merchandising company started by Justin Beck, and the event was for the music video filming of the unreleased song "Black Nurse."

On January 1, 2011 (1/1/11), all of the singles were compiled into an EP titled Our Color Green (The Singles), a possible allusion to the title of Glassjaw's first release, Our Color Green in 6/8 Time.

=== Release history ===
Release	Release date	Corresponding concert	Catalog
"All Good Junkies Go to Heaven"	August 8, 2010	Hevy Music Festival in Folkestone, United Kingdom	GJ88
"Jesus Glue"	September 9, 2010	Vibe Lounge in Long Island, New York	GJ89
"Natural Born Farmer"	October 10, 2010	Maxwell's in Hoboken, New Jersey	GJ90
"Stars"	November 11, 2010	MerchDirect in Bay Shore, New York	GJ91
"You Think You're (John Fucking Lennon)"	December 12, 2010	Knitting Factory in Brooklyn, New York	GJ92
Our Color Green (The Singles)	January 1, 2011	Best Buy Theater Times Square, New York	

== Promotion ==
To further support the release of each 7" vinyl, Glassjaw released a live, one-take DOGMA-Style video on their official website featuring another unreleased song from the EP (while it was still being speculated that all 7" singles released would be included on the aforementioned EP) with a link to their MerchDirect store. Usually these DOGMA videos would appear about 14–19 days after the 7" for that month was available on their merchandise website.

Release	Video Release date
"You Think You're (John Fucking Lennon)"	August 27, 2010
"Stars"	September 23, 2010
"Jesus Glue"	October 26, 2010
"All Good Junkies Go To Heaven"	November 25, 2010

In support of Our Color Green (The Singles), Glassjaw underwent their first full US headlining tour in four years running from February 13 through March 26, 2011. As part of a pre-order package deal for the tour, the band offered a limited edition silk-screened poster with the purchase of a ticket. During the tour, Glassjaw gave out the Coloring Book EP for free.

== Reception ==
Professional ratings
Review scores
Source	Rating
AbsolutePunk.net	(92%)
Alternative Press	4/5 stars
Rock Sound	(9/10)

Initial reception of the individual singles was generally positive. Chris Harris of Gun Shy Assassin, and also writer for MTV and Rolling Stone, praised Daryl Palumbo's vocals on "All Good Junkies Go to Heaven" and noted that the guitars sounded "vibrant, hypnotic, and ethereal — sometimes all at the same time." Harris also observed a slight electronic element, possibly influenced by Palumbo's side project Head Automatica. As the first single released, Chris Coplan of Consequence of Sound didn't feel that "All Good Junkies Go to Heaven" measured up to the five years of anticipation for new Glassjaw material, but noted, "it's got a pretty catchy, driving beat that's quick and technically sound and features some decent lyricism to boot."

Writing about the compilation Our Color Green (The Singles) Chris Harris wrote, "no sensible person would pay for this EP when they can just download it for free," however, he continued that he was a fan of the band and that he'd "like to see [Glassjaw] make some [money]."

== Track listing ==
No.	Title	Length
1.	"All Good Junkies Go to Heaven"	4:14
2.	"Jesus Glue"	5:07
3.	"Natural Born Farmer"	3:06
4.	"Stars"	3:59
5.	"You Think You're (John Fucking Lennon)"	5:16

== Personnel ==
Glassjaw

- Daryl Palumbo – lead vocals
- Justin Beck – guitars
- Durijah Lang – drums, percussion
- Manuel Carrero – bass
