= El Mark =

EP by Glassjaw
- Released: September 2, 2005
- Genre: Post-hardcore; alternative rock; experimental rock
- Label: Warner Bros.
- Producer: Ross Robinson

Glassjaw chronology
Worship and Tribute (2002)	El Mark (2005)	Our Color Green (The Singles) (2011)

El Mark is a B-side EP recording released by the band Glassjaw on September 2, 2005 exclusively on iTunes. It consists of two previously released UK B-Sides (from the "Cosmopolitan Bloodloss" single) and a new previously unreleased track, entitled "Oxycodone". The track "The Number No Good Things Come Of" features Daryl Palumbo as the only Glassjaw member, Ross Robinson plays piano and Shannon Larkin is on drums. It is also the last Glassjaw release to feature Todd Weinstock.

== Track listing ==
No.	Title	Length
1.	"El Mark"	3:38
2.	"The Number No Good Things Can Come Of"	5:04
3.	"Oxycodone"	5:44

== Writing credits ==
- All lyrics written by Daryl Palumbo
- All music written by Glassjaw
