= This Is Hell =

This Is Hell may refer to:

- This Is Hell (band), an American hardcore punk band
  - This Is Hell (This Is Hell EP), 2005
  - This Is Hell Demo, 2004
- This Is Hell (Dimension Zero album), 2004
- This Is Hell!, an American news radio show from Chicago
