= Men, Women & Children =

Men, Woman & Children may refer to:

- Men, Women & Children (album), debut album by the band with the same name (2006)
- Men, Women & Children (band), American electropop band (2004–2008)
- Men, Women & Children (film), American comedy-drama film directed by Jason Reitman (2014)
