= And Our Heart Beat in Our Fingertips, Without Reason =

And Our Heart Beat In Our Fingertips, Without Reason

Studio album by Anterrabae
- Released: June 20, 2006
- Recorded: 2006; George Fullen at General Studios, Douglaston, NY
- Genre: metalcore
- Length: 51:19
- Label: Triple Crown Records
- Producer: A Love Supreme Productions, Justin Beck, Jon Florencio, George Fullan

Anterrabae chronology
Shakedown Tonight (2004)	And Our Heart Beat In Our Fingertips, Without Reason (2006)

And Our Heart Beat in Our Fingertips, Without Reason is the second album from the metalcore band Anterrabae. It was released on June 20, 2006 on Triple Crown Records. The title is a line from Ayn Rand's Anthem.

== Track listing ==
1. Pink & Tender – 3:42
2. Stay Moist – 3:32
3. It Takes More Than Metal to Move a Bull – 3:15
4. An Albatross Around the Neck – 3:39
5. The Filthy Habits of Ex. Lovers – 3:40
6. Investigating the Phantom Signal – 3:42
7. Viper – 5:56
8. I Lifted Her Dress Over Her Head and Unscrewed Her Leg – 3:20
9. Sh*t Happens When You Party Naked – 5:50
10. A Shovel for Arch Stanton – 5:24
11. My Wrists are Rivers, My Fingers are Words – 4:30
12. The Hands of Christ Are Beautiful Hands – 4:49

Producers: George Fullan, Jonathan Florencio, & Justin Beck

Engineers: George Fullan, Jonathan Florencio

Recorded At: General Studio & Pool Room

Mixers: George Fullan, Jonathan Florencio, & Bryan Russell
