= Roadrunner Records =

Dutch record label

- Parent company: Warner Music Group
- Founded: 1980; 46 years ago
- Founder: Cees Wessels
- Distributors: Atlantic Music Group; (in the U.S.); Warner Music Group; (outside the U.S.)
- Genre: Various, with a focus on heavy metal and hard rock
- Country of origin: Netherlands
- Location: New York City
- Official website: elektramusicgroup.com/roadrunnerrecords (US site); roadrunnerrecords.co.uk (UK site)

Roadrunner Records is a Dutch record label focused on heavy metal and hard rock music. Founded in the Netherlands in 1980, it is now a division of Warner Music Group and is based in New York City. Formerly seen as one of the most powerful independent metal labels of the 1980s and 1990s, it would eventually become a massive host of metal acts, most seen in Roadrunner United and the following live concert. Since then, the label continued to put out major releases. However, by the 2020s, most major acts had left the label; it was also acquired by Warner, being relegated to something much smaller than before.

== History ==
The label was launched in 1980 in the Netherlands. Roadrunner's initial business was importing North American metal-band recordings into Europe. In 1986, Roadrunner opened its US headquarters in New York City and later opened offices in the United Kingdom, Germany, France, Japan, Australia, Denmark, Russia and Canada. Early successes included albums from King Diamond (the first Roadrunner artist to enter the Billboard Top 200 albums chart) and Annihilator. The label also handled early Metallica releases in the Scandinavian region. The end of the 1980s saw the release of two albums that are now considered classics of their respective genres: Obituary's Slowly We Rot and Sepultura's Beneath the Remains.

The 1990s saw the arrival of acts such as Cynic, Deicide, Life of Agony, Machine Head, Suffocation, Type O Negative, and underground grunge rockers Willard. As the 1990s wore on, several of Roadrunner's bands impacted the mainstream, most notably Sepultura and Type O Negative. Sepultura's 1993 album, Chaos A.D., became the first Roadrunner band to crack the Top 40 on the Billboard album chart. Type O Negative became the first Roadrunner band to receive a certification from the RIAA; this was a Gold award (and later Platinum award) for the 1993 album Bloody Kisses, which was certified in 1995. The band also became the first Roadrunner band to receive radio play. In 2000, Slipknot became the first Roadrunner band to go Platinum. Nickelback were also very successful on the label, although they were signed to another label in their native Canada. Derek Shulman ran the label in the late 1990s. In 2005, the label launched a new project called Roadrunner United to commemorate the label's 25th anniversary.

Roadrunner Records ran into financial trouble in 2001 after its distribution deal with RED Distribution through Edel Music was aborted after Edel ended up in US$400 million in debt. As Roadrunner had just taken out a US$15 million loan from Edel, Cees Wessels was forced to put 49% of the label's stock up for $30 million, attracting the interest of major labels such as RCA Records, Atlantic Records and Columbia Records. In July 2001, The Island Def Jam Music Group purchased a 50% stake in Roadrunner worth US$33 million, larger than the asking price. While there were fears of legal action from Edel, who owned 17% of Roadrunner's stock, negotiations allowed the label to switch "immediately" to Island Def Jam and its distributor, Universal Music & Video Distribution.

On December 18, 2006, Warner Music Group signed an agreement to purchase a majority in shares (73.5%) of Roadrunner Records' parent company, Roadrunner Music Group B.V. This deal became finalized on January 29, 2007, after receiving regulatory approval in Germany.

On June 11, 2008, Roadrunner Records was voted the "Best Metal Label" by Metal Hammer at their Golden Gods Awards, an award that it has won the past four years in a row. The award was accepted by Sharon den Adel and Ruud Jolie of Within Temptation, one of Roadrunner's biggest acts.

Roadrunner Records was significantly affected by Warner Music Group's legal dispute against YouTube, including having their account's YouTube partnership canceled. Most of the videos on their channel, however, are still viewable.

On November 11, 2010, Warner Music Group announced they had acquired the remainder of Roadrunner's stock, acquiring the company fully. However, WMG maintained that Roadrunner would continue to operate as a distinct brand. Cees Wessels, the label's founder, remained as CEO. Employees at Roadrunner nicknamed WMG's acquisition of the company "The Red Wedding", in reference to the Game of Thrones episode "The Rains of Castamere".

On April 26, 2012, it was announced that Warner Music Group would make substantial cutbacks throughout Roadrunner Records' worldwide operations. According to staff working at the company, the UK offices and the Canadian offices of Roadrunner Records were to be closed completely, with severe cutbacks occurring across the rest of the label worldwide. It was also announced that the Roadrunner office in the Netherlands was to close, and that the label's founder Cees Wessels was stepping down from his role of CEO. The following years saw several major Roadrunner acts dropped by the label, including DevilDriver, Cavalera Conspiracy and Alter Bridge (who both moved to Napalm Records, with Devildriver's catalogue being sold to The Echo Label), Opeth, Machine Head, Slipknot (after releasing The End, So Far in 2022) and Soulfly (all of whom followed former A&R of SVP Monte Conner to Nuclear Blast) and Dream Theater (who signed with InsideOut Music in 2017). In July 2017, British rock band Milk Teeth signed with Roadrunner Records.

In June 2018, Roadrunner became a sub-label of Warner's Elektra Music Group division. In June 2022, Elektra Music Group, and subsequently Roadrunner, was merged into the new umbrella label group 300 Elektra Entertainment.

== International labels ==
=== Roadrunner Records UK ===
Roadrunner Records UK operates out of the Warner Music London office. Their roster includes Alter Bridge, Down, Satyricon and Slash.

== Notable artists ==
=== Currently signed ===
- Blood for Blood
- Corey Taylor
- Deafheaven
- Dinosaur Pile-Up
- Gojira
- Grandson
- Guilt Trip
- Haywire 617
- Highly Suspect
- Landon Barker
- Motionless in White
- Rival Sons
- Sherane
- Teen Mortgage
- Theory of a Deadman
- Trivium
- Turnstile

=== Past Roadrunner Records artists ===
==== Active ====
- 3 Inches of Blood
- 8 Foot Sativa
- A Skylit Drive
- The Agony Scene
- Airbourne
- Alesana (including Fearless)
- Alexisonfire
- Alter Bridge
- Amanda Palmer
- The Amity Affliction
- Angel Du$t
- Annihilator
- Anthem
- Anyone
- Artillery
- Atreyu
- Atrocity
- Avenged Sevenfold
- Atrophy
- Believer
- Berri Txarrak
- Biffy Clyro
- Biohazard
- Black Flag
- Black Label Society
- Black Stone Cherry
- Behind Crimson Eyes
- Billy Talent
- Bleeker Ridge
- Boiler Room
- Brigade
- Brujeria
- Buzzoven
- Caliban
- Carnivore
- Cavalera Conspiracy
- Cerebral Fix
- Channel Zero
- Chimaira
- CKY
- Coal Chamber
- Code Orange
- Coheed and Cambria
- Collective Soul (via Loud & Proud)
- Corrosion of Conformity
- Cradle of Filth
- Crease (band)
- Creeper
- Crimson Glory
- The Cult
- Cynic
- Corey Taylor
- Dååth
- De La Tierra
- De Novo Dahl
- Defiance
- Deicide
- Delain
- Depeche Mode
- Détente
- DevilDriver
- The Devil Wears Prada
- Disincarnate
- Divine Heresy (excluding US)
- Dog Eat Dog
- Doug Stanhope
- Dommin
- Down
- DragonForce
- Dream Theater
- Dresden Dolls
- Drugstore
- Dry Kill Logic
- Earthshaker
- Electric Eel Shock
- Exhorder
- Fear Factory
- Fever 333
- Fiction Plane
- Front Line Assembly
- Funeral for a Friend
- Glassjaw
- Gorguts
- Grand Magus
- The Great Kat
- Guardian
- Hamlet
- Hatebreed
- Heartist
- Heathen
- Higher Power
- Hopesfall
- Horse the Band
- Ill Niño
- Immolation
- In This Moment
- Inglorious
- Jerry Cantrell
- Junkie XL
- Jupiter Coyote
- Kenny Wayne Shepherd (via Loud & Proud)
- Khoma
- Kids in Glass Houses
- Killswitch Engage
- King 810
- King Diamond
- Korn
- Krypteria
- Kvelertak
- Lamb of God
- Lenny Kravitz
- Life of Agony
- Loudness
- Lynyrd Skynyrd
- Machine Head
- Mad Max
- Madball
- Madina Lake
- Make Them Suffer
- Malevolent Creation
- Marmozets
- Mastodon
- Megadeth
- Mercyful Fate
- The Misfits
- Mutiny Within
- Nailbomb
- Nickelback
- Negative
- Nights Like These
- Nightwish
- Obituary
- Open Hand
- Opeth
- Outlaws
- Pain (Nordic Territories and Europe)
- Paradox
- The Parlor Mob
- Pestilence
- Periphery
- Porcupine Tree
- Possessed
- Queensrÿche (Loud & Proud)
- Ratos de Porao
- Rob Zombie
- Royal Republic
- Royseven
- Rush
- Sacrifice
- Salem
- Sammy Hagar (via Loud & Proud)
- Satan
- Satyricon
- Seven Shades
- The Sheila Divine
- Sinch
- Shelter
- Shinedown
- Slash
- Slipknot
- Soulfly
- Soziedad Alkoholika
- Sparks
- Spineshank
- Spoil Engine
- Staind
- Static Dress
- Steve Miller Band
- Still Remains
- The Stranglers
- Suffocation
- Taking Dawn
- Thor
- Thornley
- Throwdown
- Times of Grace
- Toxik
- Treponem Pal
- Unto Others
- VIMIC
- Vision of Disorder
- Vicious Rumors
- Wednesday 13
- We Are Harlot
- Whiplash
- The Winery Dogs
- Within Temptation
- The Wombats
- Xentrix
- Young the Giant

==== Disbanded ====
- 36 Crazyfists
- Amen
- Baby Fox
- Bad Seed Rising
- Baptized in Blood
- Betzefer
- Black Train Jack
- Death
- Delight
- DoubleDrive
- Downthesun
- Faktion
- Five Pointe O
- Gruntruck
- Hail the Villain
- Heaven and Hell
- Karma to Burn
- The Karelia
- Kiss
- Milk Teeth
- Murderdolls
- Non-Intentional Lifeform
- New York Dolls
- Optimum Wound Profile
- Pe'z
- Ratt
- The Red Shore
- Sanctity
- Scar the Martyr
- Sepultura
- Shihad
- Skin Chamber
- Stone Sour
- Storm Corrosion
- To My Surprise
- Type O Negative
- Willard
- Wild Throne

==== Retired ====
- Fish

==== Deceased ====
- Big Rude Jake
- Garrett Lewis

== Criticism ==
Since the 1990s, Roadrunner Records has been criticised by several of its alumni over its record contracts, business practices and management and promotion of its releases. Artists who have criticised Roadrunner include Megadeth, Slipknot, Obituary, Opeth, Chimaira, Keith Caputo, Vision of Disorder and Sepultura.

Glassjaw members Daryl Palumbo and Justin Beck continue to speak unfavourably of Roadrunner, years after the problems the band experienced with them. They openly advise people not to buy their first full-length so as not to give the label money, and have repeatedly told fans at shows to illegally download the record. Palumbo has said: "Roadrunner is a joke. Roadrunner's not even a real label. It has the power to be one of the superpowers in the heavy music industry. While labels like Victory Records, which is such a small hardcore label, is totally surpassing Roadrunner... It's like the scourge of the music industry. Beck has said: "Seriously, don't ever support anything from Roadrunner – they suck!" Palumbo has said that Roadrunner didn't put the band on enough tours: "We never toured half as much as we wanted to, I just wish we got to tour more in support of [Everything You Ever Wanted to Know About Silence]"; and, "They are a miserable fuckin' corporation that does not bend for their bands, does not give their bands anything and they're just terrible businessmen....They had 2 cash cows, Slipknot and Nickelback, and every other project they had rode backseat to those bands, and then the second that the new Slipknot record came out and didn't go quadruple Platinum in the first few hours it was released they fuckin' turned their backs on Slipknot. That label just wants instant gratification where it sells its units and that's a joke. You can't run a major corporation with that as your business strategy".

== See also ==
- List of record labels
- Earache Records
- Metal Blade Records

== Soundtracks ==
- Faust: Love of the Damned (2000–2001)
- Ginger Snaps (2000–2001)
- Resident Evil (2002)
- Spider-Man (2002)
- Freddy vs. Jason (2003)
- Resident Evil: Apocalypse (2004)
