= Material Control =

Studio album by Glassjaw
- Released: December 1, 2017
- Recorded: 2015–2016
- Studios: Rumah Gue; Soft Noise; Vu Du Studios
- Genre: Post-hardcore
- Length: 36:35
- Label: Century Media
- Producer: Glassjaw

Glassjaw chronology
Coloring Book (2011)	Material Control (2017)

Singles from Material Control
- 1. "Shira" Released: November 24, 2017; 2. "Golgotha" Released: June 28, 2018

Material Control is the third studio album by American post-hardcore band Glassjaw. It is their first full-length album in 15 years, following 2002's Worship & Tribute, and 6 years since their previous EP, 2011's Coloring Book. It was released on December 1, 2017. It is their first full length without guitarist Todd Weinstock.

== Background ==
Following a few years of relative inactivity, on December 1, 2015 Glassjaw released 'New White Extremity', the first new music from the band since 2011's Coloring Book, with the information that the song is from a forthcoming album. The Dillinger Escape Plan drummer Billy Rymer confirmed that he played on "about an album's worth of songs" for a potential new Glassjaw album. Aside from a few short tours in 2016, the band did not allude to a new album throughout the year until November 15, 2017 when Amazon prematurely posted the album title, release date and track listing on their website. The band's founders, vocalist Daryl Palumbo and guitarist Justin Beck, wrote the album entirely themselves with Justin Beck handling all of the instruments except drums, which were performed by Billy Rymer, additional percussion on 'Bastille Day' by former bassist Ariel Telford, and additional vocals by Mind Over Matter frontman George Reynolds on 'Pompeii'. While most of the songs were written just prior to the recording sessions, 'Citizen' – the third track on the album – was written by the band in 1998 and has appeared in setlists as far back as 2001 titled as 'Neo' or 'Neo Tokyon'. 'Bastille Day' was mostly recorded by former Glassjaw bassist Ariel Telford, aside from hand claps added by the band. Palumbo and Beck said that they wanted to make sure that the album had a "post-apocalyptic" and "urgent" feel to it. The lyric themes of the album generally fall under the same categories except for the fourth track – 'Golgotha'– which Palumbo has said is about becoming a family man.

== Release ==
The band released the album on CD and digitally on December 1, 2017 with a record release show held the same day at Brooklyn's Saint Vitus. Physical copies of the CD were only available through the band's MerchDirect store, Amazon and local Long Island record store Looney Tunes with December 22, 2017 as the date of a nationwide physical release. It sold 3,900 copies in its first week.

== Reception ==
Professional ratings
Aggregate scores
Source	Rating
Metacritic	76/100
Review scores
Source	Rating
Clash	6/10
Consequence of Sound	B−
Exclaim!	8/10
Pitchfork	6.6/10
Sputnikmusic	4.5/5 stars
ThePRP	4/5 stars

Material Control received positive reception and critical praise upon release. ThePRP gave the album a 4 out of 5, noting that the album is "almost guaranteed to be a blur your first time through." Brooklyn Vegan wrote " I don’t know if ALT 92.3 is gonna start playing Material Control, but the album is certainly good enough to be the new post-hardcore album that rock fans rally behind." Sputnikmusic gave the album a "Superb" rating of 4.5 out of 5, while Kill Your Stereo gave the band a 90 out of 100.

== Track listing ==
All lyrics written by Daryl Palumbo. All music written by Justin Beck.

No.	Title	Length
1.	"New White Extremity"	4:25
2.	"Shira"	3:57
3.	"Citizen"	2:21
4.	"Golgotha"	3:04
5.	"Strange Hours"	4:09
6.	"Bastille Day"	2:22
7.	"Pompeii"	3:49
8.	"Bibleland 6"	3:30
9.	"Closer"	2:38
10.	"My Conscience Weighs a Ton"	2:44
11.	"Material Control"	1:25
12.	"Cut and Run"	2:10

== Personnel ==
Personnel per booklet.

Band

- Daryl Palumbo – vocals, production, sound engineer, mixing
- Justin Beck – guitars, bass, percussion, production, sound engineer, mixing

Additional musicians

- Billy Rymer – drums (all, except on "Strange Hours")
- Chad Hasty – drums (on "Strange Hours")
- Akincana Krishna Dasa – percussion, harmonium
- George Reynolds – vocals (on "Pompeii")
- Ariel Telford – percussion (on "Bastille Day")

Production

- Geoffrey Nielsen – sound engineer
- TJ Penzone – sound engineer
- Joe LaPorta – mastering
- Mike Watts – sound engineer, mixing

== Charts ==
Chart (2017)	Peak position
US Top Alternative Albums (Billboard)	24
US Top Current Album Sales (Billboard)	65
US Top Hard Rock Albums (Billboard)	12
US Top Independent Albums (Billboard)	7
