= Color Film =

American post-punk/new wave band

Color Film is a post-punk/new wave band from New York formed in 2012 by Glassjaw/Head Automatica frontman Daryl Palumbo and former Men Women & Children bassist/current Head Automatica multi-instrumentalist Richard Penzone.

== History ==
Palumbo announced on his Twitter account that he and friend/ex-Men, Women & Children member Rick Penzone were entering the mixing stages of their first LP with a new project, called Color Film. The duo were featured on the track "It's A Sin" off of Nick Hook's Without You EP. On October 18, 2012, Color Film played their first show at Irving Plaza, New York. Along with the announcement of the show, the band's site went online, revealing their debut full-length details and a download of the track "52 Minds" in exchange for a scratch off ticket code. The album, titled Living Arrangements, was produced by the duo and mixed by Gareth Jones and is expected for a 2013 release. "Bad Saint", another track from the record, is available for streaming and download on Color Film SoundCloud page.

September 2013 saw the release of "It's A Sin" video by Nick Hook featuring Color Film.

Color Film released their debut EP "Until You Turn Blue" on October 22, 2013, on Calm + Collect. The band also released a live video for their track "Small Town".

On June 16, 2017, Color Film released their debut album Living Arrangements on Epitaph Records.
