= Coloring Book (disambiguation) =

A coloring book is a type of book containing line art.

Coloring Book or Colouring Book may also refer to:

- Coloring Book (mixtape), a 2016 mixtape by Chance the Rapper
- Coloring Book (Glassjaw EP), a 2011 EP by Glassjaw
- Coloring Book, a 2012 EP by Buck Owens
- Coloring Book (Oh My Girl EP), a 2017 EP by Oh My Girl
- "The Colouring Book", an episode of the TV series Pocoyo

== See also ==
- Color book, in diplomatic history, an officially sanctioned collection of diplomatic correspondence and other documents published by a government for educational or political reasons, or to promote the government position on current or past events
