= Coloring Book (Glassjaw EP) =

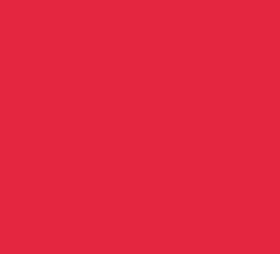

EP by Glassjaw
- Released: February 13, 2011
- Genre: Post-hardcore; experimental rock
- Length: 27:55
- Label: Self-released
- Producer: Ryan Seigel, Jonathan Florencio

Glassjaw chronology
Our Color Green (The Singles) (2011)	Coloring Book (2011)	Material Control (2017)

Professional ratings
Review scores
Source	Rating
AbsolutePunk	(88%)
Alternative Press	4/5 stars
Sputnikmusic	(4.5/5)
ThePRP	4.5/5 stars

Coloring Book is the fourth extended play by the American post-hardcore band Glassjaw, self-released on February 13, 2011. The release was initially exclusively given away for free during the group's February–March 2011 tour, and was said to serve as a preview for Glassjaw's upcoming third studio album. The EP was later made available on Glassjaw's webstore on September 15, 2012, packaged in a red gatefold sleeve along with a pink-colored DVD, Coloring Book: Live at the Forum.

A limited edition 12" vinyl pressing of the EP was released on August 13, 2013. Each disc is unique in that they were made up of three rings, each in different colors, thus meaning no two copies are the same. The 12" edition was limited to 120 pieces.

== Track listing ==
No.	Title	Length
1.	"Black Nurse"	3:52
2.	"Gold"	4:43
3.	"Vanilla Poltergeist Snake"	3:22
4.	"Miracles in Inches"	3:41
5.	"Stations of the New Cross"	6:55
6.	"Daytona White"	5:22

== Personnel ==
Glassjaw

- Daryl Palumbo – lead vocals
- Justin Beck – guitars, keys
- Durijah Lang – drums, percussion
- Manuel Carrero – bass

Production and recording

- Ryan Seigel – production
- Jonathan Florencio – production
- Samuel Vaughan Merrick IV – mixing

== Release history ==
Release history for Coloring Book
Region	Label	Format	Date	Ref.
United States	Self-released	CD	February 13, 2011	
Various	Self-released	CD+DVD	September 15, 2012	
Various	Self-released	LP	August 16, 2013	
Various	Self-released	LP; CD; DD; streaming	February 15, 2021	
