= Warbirds (EP) =

EP by This Is Hell
- Released: August 18, 2009
- Recorded: June 8–10, 2009
- Venue: The Outpost in Stoughton, Massachusetts
- Genre: Crossover thrash, hardcore punk
- Length: 11:24
- Label: Think Fast!
- Producer: Jim Siegel

This Is Hell chronology
Misfortunes (2008)	Warbirds (2009)	Weight of the World (2010)

Professional ratings
Review scores
Source	Rating
Alternative Press	3/5 stars

Warbirds is an extended play by American hardcore punk band This Is Hell. The album was released on August 18, 2009 through Think Fast! Records. Similar to This Is Hell's 2007 extended play, Cripplers, this release features unreleased new material in addition to cover songs. The album is available in 7" vinyl and digital download formats, and will not be available on CD after Think Fast's decision in January 2009 to only release music in digital and vinyl formats. Warbirds was This Is Hell's first release since their departure with Trustkill Records, as announced in April 2009. The first pressing was limited to 1,300 physical copies (300 in clear/blue vinyl, 700 in black vinyl and 300 in white/pink vinyl as a Hot Topic exclusive color).

The songs on the album feature more of a crossover thrash sound than the band's previous hardcore punk style. Guitarist Rick Jimenez stated in a press release that the songs were influenced by Metallica, Anthrax, Cro-Mags and Leeway.

== Track listing ==
1. "The Search" – 2:28
2. "Warbirds" – 1:09
3. "Worship Syndrome" – 2:40
4. "Crazy But Not Insane" (Warzone cover) – 2:11
5. "Never Tear Us Apart" (INXS cover) – 2:56

== Personnel ==
This Is Hell

- Travis Reilly – vocals
- Andrew Jones – bass
- Rick Jimenez – guitar, vocals
- Ben Mead – drums

Production

- Produced by Jim Siegel at The Outpost
- Mastered by Jason Livermore at The Blasting Room

Art

- Artwork and layout by Josh Shearon
- Logo by Glenn Catteeuw
