= This Is Hell (This Is Hell EP) =

EP by This Is Hell
- Released: May 16, 2005
- Recorded: March 2005 at Atomic Studios
- Genre: Hardcore punk
- Length: 13:34
- Label: State of Mind
- Producer: Dean Baltoulnis

This Is Hell chronology
This Is Hell Demo (2004)	This Is Hell (2005)	Sundowning (2006)

This Is Hell is the first EP from the band This Is Hell. After quickly forming the band and releasing a demo ep, This Is Hell returned to the studio to work on their next release. For an early release, This is Hell generated a lot of hype and received good reviews. Some critics still argue that this was the bands finest work to date.

The sound of the EP is a continuation and expansion of the sound on their previous release. This release has more professionally done mixing and recording. It shows an even more aggressive side of the band not previously seen. Also featured on this EP are the addition of Glassjaw's singer Daryl Palumbo on the final track. The final track is also a cover of hardcore punk band 108.

== Track listing ==
All songs written by This Is Hell, except for track 6 originally written and recorded by 108.

1. "Dead Salutes" – 2:50
2. "Heaven Sent, Hell Bound" – 1:23
3. "Diamond Lanterns" – 1:51
4. "Moving Targets" – 2:12
5. "AD Infinitum" – 2:25
6. "When Death Closes Your Eyes" (108 Cover) – 2:52

== Personnel ==
- Travis Reilly – vocals
- Rick Jimenez – guitar
- Jeff Tiu – bass and vocals
- Dan Bourke – drums
- Joe Osolin – guitar
- Daryl Palumbo – guest vocals
- Produced by Dean Baltoulnis
- Mastered by Tom Hutton
- Layout and art by Jeremy Wabiszczewicz
