= Sons of Abraham =

US musical group

- Origin: Long Island, New York, United States
- Genres: Metalcore • hardcore punk
- Years active: 1994–1998
- Label: Exit Records (an imprint of Wreck-Age)
- Spinoff of: Glassjaw
- Members: Neil Rubenstein; Justin Beck; Todd Weinstock; Mitch Skalka; Stefan Linde

Sons of Abraham were a five-piece Jewish straight edge metalcore band from Long Island, New York. They released one demo, a split EP with Indecision, and a CD/LP Termites In His Smile. They disbanded in 1998, as guitarists Justin Beck and Todd Weinstock decided to concentrate on their other band, Glassjaw with friend Daryl Palumbo.

The band's vocalist, Neil Rubenstein, became a tour manager for several bands including Motion City Soundtrack, and a stand-up comedian.

== Members ==
- Neil Rubenstein – lead vocals
- Justin Beck – guitars
- Todd Weinstock – guitars, backing vocals
- Mitch Skalka – bass
- Stefan Linde – drums

== Discography ==
=== Studio albums ===
- Termites In His Smile CD/LP (1997, Exit/Choke Inc)

=== EPs ===
- Sons Of Abraham / Indecision 7" split (1997, Exit)
