= Misfortunes (album) =

Studio album by This Is Hell
- Released: February 19, 2008
- Recorded: 2007 at Full Force Studio
- Genre: Hardcore punk
- Length: 40:51
- Label: Trustkill

This Is Hell chronology
Cripplers (2007)	Misfortunes (2008)	Warbirds (2009)

Professional ratings
Review scores
Source	Rating
AbsolutePunk.net	84%
AllMusic	3/5 stars
Alt Press	4.5/5 stars
Rockmidgets.com	5/5 stars
Unglued Reviews	(positive)

Misfortunes the second full-length album by hardcore punk band This Is Hell. It was released on February 19, 2008 through Trustkill Records. After extensive worldwide touring in 2007, the band managed to find time to write and record an album. An earlier version of "Infected" can also be found on the band's prior release Cripplers (EP). An additional track, "Cement Shoes", was found in the leak of the album and is also available on the UK version of the CD release.

== Track listing ==
1. "Reckless" - 1:59
2. "Infected" - 2:31
3. "Disciples" - 4:23
4. "In Shambles" - 4:26
5. "Realization: Remorse" - 1:46
6. "Without Closure" - 1:48
7. "Remnants" - 3:36
8. "Resuscitate" - 3:25
9. "Fearless Vampires" - 2:14
10. "You Are the Antithesis" - 3:20
11. "End of an Era" - 3:25
12. "Memoirs" - 3:43
13. "Last Days Campaign" - 4:15

=== Bonus tracks ===
14. "Show No Mercy" (Cro-Mags cover) (Vinyl version)
15. "Cement Shoes"

== Personnel ==
This Is Hell

- Travis Reilly - vocals
- Rick Jimenez - guitar and vocals
- John Moore - bass
- Dan Bourke - drums
- Chris Reynolds - guitar

Crew vocals

- Brian Audley
- Dan Terr
- Jeff Tiu
- Chris Mazella
- Brendan Garrone
- Andrew Dijorio
- Joe Cincotta
