= Worship and Tribute =

Studio album by Glassjaw
- Released: July 9, 2002
- Recorded: 2001–2002
- Genre: Post-hardcore
- Length: 45:45
- Labels: I Am; Warner Bros.
- Producer: Ross Robinson

Glassjaw chronology
Everything You Ever Wanted to Know About Silence (2000)	Worship and Tribute (2002)	El Mark (2005)

Singles from Worship and Tribute
- 1. "Cosmopolitan Bloodloss" Released: December 9, 2002; 2. "Ape Dos Mil" Released: April 22, 2003

Worship and Tribute is the second studio album by American post-hardcore band Glassjaw, released on July 9, 2002, through I Am and Warner Bros. Records. As with their first full-length album, Worship and Tribute was produced by Ross Robinson and mixed and engineered by Mike Fraser.

Worship and Tribute debuted at number 82 on the Billboard 200 and remained on the chart for three weeks. It is their only entry on the chart to date. It has since been recognized as one of the greatest post-hardcore albums and one of the greatest albums of the 2000s.

== Production and style ==
Vocalist Daryl Palumbo has stated that while Glassjaw's debut album was filled with negativity, Worship and Tribute is much more optimistic in tone. Regarding the album title, Palumbo expressed how the bands that influenced Glassjaw have shaped their musical identity and are therefore being honored through Glassjaw's music:

"You are only a sum of all of your influences and that's what we are. . . I think that we're original and I think that what we're doing is different and that's something I always knew we had on our side, but no matter how original you are you're still just a sum of your influences."

Guitarist Todd Weinstock has regarded continuity as the biggest difference between Glassjaw's debut album and Worship and Tribute, noting "EYEWTKAS was just kind a bunch of songs written over years and when we got signed we were like 'okay we got some songs we can throw together.' With Worship we went into it with the intentions of writing an album that made sense as a unit as opposed to a bunch of songs, some of which may have even been written four years earlier!" He also noted that, due to the fact that the album was written around the time of the September 11 attacks, its tone was affected by the tragedy.

Originally, Worship and Tribute was to have twelve songs with the last song entitled "Convectuoso." The band, however, had recorded the song with their previous label, Roadrunner Records, for the "Ry Ry's Song" single. Since Glassjaw abruptly ended their contract to sign with Warner Bros., Roadrunner retained the rights to that song and refused to let the newly rerecorded "Convectuoso" be released on the final album despite being on promotional copies. In 2022, after Roadrunner was absorbed into Warner Music Group, Glassjaw reached out to Warner Bros. to put "Convectuoso" as the final track on the vinyl release of Worship and Tribute featured in the band's 20+ Year Anniversary Collection, as was initially intended.

== Promotion and touring ==
Dave Allen joined Glassjaw as bassist following the recording of Worship and Tribute. The band then toured extensively, including festival tours such as Warped Tour, Ozzfest and SnoCore, and an appearance at Skate and Surf Fest. In April and May 2002, the band toured with Converge, Reach the Sky, and Stalemate. They embarked on a co-headlining US tour with Poison the Well in May 2002; both acts were supported by Vex Red and Recover. In June, the band went on a brief tour of the east coast with the Juliana Theory and Piebald. Following this, Glassjaw toured as part of Warped Tour and Ozzfest between July and September 2002. "Cosmopolitan Bloodloss" was released to Active rock radio on September 27, 2002.

Daryl Palumbo's Crohn's disease brought heavy burden onto Glassjaw's touring schedule in promotion of Worship and Tribute. On October 1, 2002, he was rushed to a Paris hospital and Glassjaw's European tour schedule was postponed for December. In October and November, the band went on a headlining US tour with American Nightmare, the Blood Brothers, and Open Hand. On December 5, as Glassjaw returned from a US flight, Palumbo relapsed and was again rushed to a London hospital and forced the cancellation of the rescheduled dates. Later in December, the band appeared at Gainesvillefest. In February and March, the band toured across the US with Hot Water Music and Sparta as part of the 2003 Sno-Core Tour. "Ape Dos Mil" was released to Modern rock radio on February 11, 2003; the song's music video was posted online five days later. The European dates were rescheduled for a second time in April 2003. From June to August, the group went on the 2003 edition of Warped Tour.

The band were due to perform the album in full at the Sonisphere Festival at Knebworth on the 10th anniversary of the album's release, but the event was cancelled.

== Packaging ==
The original 2002 CD release of the album did not include a front insert, but rather a clear film sheet that had a picture of a record player arm. The disc itself was designed to look like a vinyl record, and the inside tray included a picture of a record player. The overall product is supposed to look like a vinyl record being played on a record player. The album was reissued for the first time on vinyl format in 2011 for Record Store Day. The record was packaged in a clear plastic sleeve with a picture of a record player arm printed on the front of the sleeve. It also included a sheet with the picture of the record player printed on it. This first pressing is known for its PVC sleeve which caused a chemical reaction and damaged the record within it. The vinyl version was reissued again in 2014, with 1,000 copies pressed on clear vinyl.

== Critical reception ==
Professional ratings
Review scores
Source	Rating
Allmusic	3/5 stars
Collector's Guide to Heavy Metal	8/10
Exclaim!	(positive)
Kerrang!	5/5 stars
Metal Hammer	8/10
NME	8/10
Ox-Fanzine	8/10
PopMatters	(mixed)

Allmusic's William Ruhlmann gave Worship and Tribute a positive review, noting "Cosmopolitan Bloodloss" an AMG Track Pick. He described Glassjaw as "more interesting than their metal peers" and reflected "Glassjaw can pound it out like the best of them, but the fun comes in never knowing what variation the band will throw in next." Billboard called the album "innovative." Pitchfork referred to Worship and Tribute as a "genre-defining work."

NME declared Worship and Tribute to be "the greatest 'underground breakthrough' album since Deftones." The Long Island Press called it "the album that helped rethink, reshape, and expand the boundaries of the genre". Mehan Jayasuriya of PopMatters noted "Worship and Tribute addressed many of these lyrical flaws [of Glassjaw's debut album] and introduced a wider palette of sounds to the band's arsenal; in so doing, however, it lost sight of much of the momentum and focus that made the band notable in the first place." Adrien Begrand, also of PopMatters, gave an in-depth review where he acknowledged the band's talent in select songs but also stressed the poor quality of Worship and Tribute as a whole: "They've shown they're a smart band, both musically and lyrically, but on Worship and Tribute, listeners are stuck with 40 percent inspiration, 60 percent filler."

The January 2008 issue of Alternative Press (AP #234) included Worship and Tribute on its "10 Essential Albums We're Waiting For Follow Ups to." The issue also hyped the oncoming Head Automatica album. Alternative Press ranked "Ape Dos Mil" at number 60 on their list of the best 100 singles from the 2000s.

Accolades for Worship and Tribute
Publication	List	Year	Rank	Ref.
BrooklynVegan	15 albums that defined the 2000s post-hardcore boom	2020	N/A	
BrooklynVegan	35 Best Emo & Post-Hardcore Albums of 2002	2022	3	
Drowned in Sound	Top 41 Albums of 2002	2003	N/A	
Gigwise	The 11 most vicious post-hardcore albums ever	2015	N/A	
Hit Parader	The Top 100 CDs of the 21st Century	2008	81	
Kerrang!	Kerrang! Albums Of The Year 2002	2002	11	
Kerrang!	666 Albums You Must Hear Before You Die!	2011	N/A	
Kludge	The Best of 2002	2002	N/A	
Loudwire	The 10 Best Post-Hardcore Albums of the Early 2000s	2019	3	
Metal Hammer	Albums Of 2002	2002	13	
NME	20 Emo Albums That Have Resolutely Stood The Test Of Time	2015	10	
Paste	The 25 Greatest Punk Albums of the 2000s	2017	7	
Rock Sound	Critics' Poll 2002	2002	7	
Rock Sound	The 250 Greatest Albums of Our Lifetime	2019	24	
Sputnikmusic	Top 100 Albums of the Decade (2000s)	2010	15	

=== Awards ===
- Nominated for a Best Recording Package Grammy in 2003.
- In 2007, Kerrang! named Worship and Tribute an "album you must own."

== Track listing ==
All music written by Glassjaw; all lyrics written by Daryl Palumbo.

No.	Title	Length
1.	"Tip Your Bartender"	2:59
2.	"Mu Empire"	3:44
3.	"Cosmopolitan Bloodloss"	3:04
4.	"Ape Dos Mil"	5:03
5.	"Pink Roses"	2:56
6.	"Must've Run All Day"	4:53
7.	"Stuck Pig"	3:23
8.	"Radio Cambodia"	2:55
9.	"The Gillette Cavalcade of Sports"	5:56
10.	"Trailer Park Jesus"	4:30
11.	"Two Tabs of Mescaline"	8:18

- "Two Tabs of Mescaline" ends at 6:12. After 1 minute and 30 seconds of silence, at 7:42, an untitled hidden track begins. The hidden track is kept on track 11, even on the Japanese version where the bonus track, "El Mark", follows. However, on the advance CD, "Two Tabs of Mescaline" is only 6:12, while the hidden track is placed at the end of "Convectuoso" (5:45).

== B-Sides ==
There are 7 B-sides from Worship and Tribute:

No.	Title	Length
1.	"Convectuoso" (originally track #12, appears on promotional versions of album)	7:52
2.	"Oxycodone" (Released on the El Mark iTunes EP)	5:44
3.	"Midwestern Stylings"	3:17
4.	"Grasper"	4:04
5.	"Tewt"	5:05
6.	"El Mark" (Appears on the Cosmopolitan Bloodloss CD/7" single, later released on the El Mark iTunes EP)	3:39
7.	"The Number No Good Things Can Come Of" (Appears on the Cosmopolitan Bloodloss CD single, later released on the El Mark iTunes EP)	5:06

- "Convectuoso" ends at 5:45. The hidden track follows it, beginning at 7:15.
- The song "Neo Tokyon" was recorded for the album. The band played it live before the album came out and it hadn't been heard since. While the band did some 2016 touring, it made its way back into their setlist as "Neo" before finally being released under the name "Citizen" on their 2017 album Material Control.

== Personnel ==
Personnel per booklet.

Glassjaw

- Daryl Palumbo – vocals
- Justin Beck – guitar, bass
- Todd Weinstock – guitar
- Shannon Larkin – drums
- Larry Gorman – backing vocals

Production and design

- Ross Robinson – producer
- Mike Fraser – mixing (all except track 3)
- Chris Lord-Alge – mixing (track 3)

== Appearances ==
- The song "Cosmopolitan Bloodloss" was featured in the video game Legends of Wrestling II in 2002.

== Charts ==
Chart (2002)	Peak position
US Billboard 200	82

== Release history ==
Release history for Worship and Tribute
Region	Label	Format	Date	Ref.
United States	Warner Bros. Records	CD	July 9, 2002	
United Kingdom	Warner Bros. Records	CD	August 12, 2002	
Canada	Warner Bros. Records	CD	September 3, 2002	
Various	Warner Bros. Records	LP	April 16, 2011	
Various	Music on Vinyl	LP	June 9, 2014	
Various	AML	LP	July 9, 2022 (Note: As part of 20+ Anniversaries Vinyl Collection (2022))	
