= Cosmopolitan Bloodloss =

Single by Glassjaw

from the album Worship and Tribute
- Released: December 9, 2002
- Recorded: 2001
- Genre: Post-hardcore
- Length: 3:05
- Label: Warner Bros.
- Songwriters: Glassjaw (music); Daryl Palumbo (lyrics)
- Producer: Ross Robinson

Glassjaw singles chronology
"Ry Ry's Song" (2000)	"Cosmopolitan Bloodloss" (2002)	"Ape Dos Mil" (2003)

"Cosmopolitan Bloodloss" is the lead single from Glassjaw's 2002 studio album, Worship and Tribute. Two differing versions were released in the US and the UK.

As with many Glassjaw songs, "Cosmopolitan Bloodloss" is lyrically ambiguous and oddly phrased. It mentions a nervous female and someone at an airport "addressing most littlest." It is widely speculated that this song is written from the perspective of someone who is opposed to abortion, with Daryl Palumbo himself being pro-choice. Aiding the song's complexity are its many independent layers of guitar which help give it an aggressive and somewhat paranoid feel. The song was featured in the video games Legends of Wrestling II in 2002 and Project Gotham Racing 2 in 2003.

== Music video ==
Both versions of the single contain the "Cosmopolitan Bloodloss" music video which found marginal airplay on music TV networks. Directed by Patrick Hoelck, it features Vincent Gallo and has the band performing in an alley in New York City. Their loud music awakens Gallo who then begins physically confronting strangers as he walks the streets of New York. He eventually finds the alley the band is performing in, walks up to them, and unplugs their equipment just before the song is finished. He then gives them a long, angry stare as the video fades to black.

An alternate ending was shot for the video in which Gallo walks up to the band, produces a pistol, and shoots each member. It was deemed too violent for TV but can be found online.

== Track listing ==
=== US version ===
1. "Cosmopolitan Bloodloss" – 3:04
2. "Trailer Park Jesus" – 4:30
3. "El Mark" – 3:40

=== UK version ===
1. "Cosmopolitan Bloodloss" – 3:04
2. "El Mark" – 3:40
3. "The Number No Good Things Can Come of" – 5:05
