= Weight of the World (This Is Hell album) =

Studio album by This Is Hell
- Released: June 8, 2010
- Recorded: February 2010
- Genre: Hardcore punk, crossover thrash
- Length: 31:44
- Label: Rise

This Is Hell chronology
Warbirds (2009)	Weight of the World (2010)	Black Mass (2011)

Professional ratings
Review scores
Source	Rating
Rock Sound	9/10 stars

Weight of the World is the third studio album by American punk band This Is Hell and was released on June 8, 2010. The album is the band's first release through Rise Records since leaving Trustkill Records. Weight of the World was recorded in February 2010. The songs "Worship Syndrome" and "The Search" were previously released on This Is Hell's 2009 EP, Warbirds.

One of the themes of Weight of the World is living life to its fullest potential and avoiding pressures to become "ideal." The opening track "No One Leaves Unscathed," is about following one's true passion, and not taking a 9 to 5 job just because "society tells us we need to." Professional wrestler Terry Funk partially influenced Rick Jiminez's lyrics on the song. Jiminez praised Funk's ability to wrestle into his 60s, commenting, "He found his passion in life and inexplicably immersed himself in it from a very young age and stuck with it well into middle age. He paved his own way in his industry, constantly pushed the limit and surprisingly, never let it go to his head."

== Track listing ==
1. "No One Leaves Unscathed" – 3:12
2. "The Night the Line Was Crossed" – 2:43
3. "Out Come the Bastards" – 1:33
4. "Bloodlines" – 2:50
5. "Eagle of Justice" – 1:56
6. "Death of World Class" – 1:39
7. "The Search" – 2:30
8. "Forever Discontent" – 1:56
9. "Shadows" – 2:58
10. "Destroyer" – 1:36
11. "Worship Syndrome" – 2:40
12. "Fall and Rise" – 1:34
13. "Snake Eyes" – 4:47
