= Black Train Jack =

American melodic hardcore punk band

Black Train Jack was an American melodic hardcore and punk rock band from New York City, active during the early to mid-1990s. Formed in 1992 following the dissolution of the hardcore band Token Entry, Black Train Jack was notable within the New York hardcore (NYHC) scene for its melodic sound and positive lyrical themes. The band released two studio albums through Roadrunner Records before disbanding in 1995.

== History ==
Black Train Jack was formed in Astoria, Queens, in 1992 by guitarist Ernie Parada, who had previously been the drummer for the prominent New York hardcore band Token Entry. Parada switched to guitar and recruited former Token Entry roadie Rob Vitale as the lead vocalist. The lineup was completed with the addition of bassist Nick Forlano and drummer Brian Goldstein. The band derived its name from a line in the Henry Rollins band track "Wreckage", following an incident where the members' vehicle went off-road into a waste area.

The band signed with Roadrunner Records and released its debut studio album, No Reward, on July 13, 1993, co-produced by Anthony Countey. Musically, the album blended fast-paced hardcore tempos with melodic vocal hooks and positive lyrical messages. In support of the record, the band toured extensively, including regional dates alongside fellow New York hardcore group Sick of It All. The album received significant regional press attention and national underground radio tracking, establishing the band beyond their native New York market.

In 1994, Black Train Jack released its second and final studio album, You're Not Alone. The album continued the band's signature style of blending melodic rock hooks with aggressive underlying hardcore rhythms, achieving widespread rotation on college alternative radio and tracking on the national CMJ charts. To promote the album, the band produced a professional music video for the lead single "Handouts", which successfully entered television broadcast rotation on MTV's alternative music program 120 Minutes. The group officially disbanded in 1995.

Following the breakup, vocalist Rob Vitale and other members formed the band Nine Lives, which released three albums in the late 1990s and early 2000s. Guitarist Ernie Parada later participated in several punk rock projects, including Grey Area and the supergroup Higher Giant. The original members reunited periodically for one-off benefit performances, including a high-profile CBGB benefit show alongside Gorilla Biscuits in August 2005. On March 28, 2021, lead vocalist Rob Vitale died due to complications from COVID-19.

== Musical style and themes ==
While traditional New York hardcore bands of the era favored aggressive breakdowns and a darker sonic landscape, Black Train Jack was noted for integrating upbeat pop-punk sensibilities and classic rock influences into their song structures. Critics compared their sound to a cross between traditional street hardcore and the pop-inflected style of bands like the Descendents.

The band was regularly tracked, reviewed, and featured across mainstream subculture publications and foundational underground punk zines alike, including profiles in Thrasher Magazine and tracking slots on Maximumrocknroll Radio. Lyrically, the band rejected the typical "slacker" tropes of 1990s alternative rock, choosing instead to promote self-discipline, clear-headedness, and personal accountability.

== Discography ==
- No Reward (Roadrunner Records, 1993)
- You're Not Alone (Roadrunner Records, 1994)
