= Everything You Ever Wanted to Know About Silence =

Studio album by Glassjaw
- Released: May 9, 2000
- Recorded: 1999–2000
- Studio: Indigo Ranch Studios (Malibu, California)
- Genre: Post-hardcore; nu metal
- Length: 51:47
- Label: Roadrunner
- Producer: Ross Robinson

Glassjaw chronology
Kiss Kiss Bang Bang (1997)	Everything You Ever Wanted to Know About Silence (2000)	Worship and Tribute (2002)

Singles from Everything You Ever Wanted to Know About Silence
- 1. "Pretty Lush" Released: 2000; 2. "Ry Ry's Song" Released: November 27, 2000

Everything You Ever Wanted to Know About Silence is the debut album of American post-hardcore band Glassjaw, released on May 9, 2000, by Roadrunner Records. It was produced by Ross Robinson. The album received positive reviews from critics, and has since been cited as an influential album in the genre.

Glassjaw has been rumored to discourage the purchasing of this album due to their acrimonious split from Roadrunner Records. Instead, they encourage people to download their music via file sharing software, such as Limewire. Robinson claimed that the label showed no interest in the band until he pushed to have them signed and showed little interest after.

A remastered version of the album was released on March 24, 2009, with two bonus tracks: "Convectuoso" and a cover of Youth of Today's "Modern Love Story".

== Background and recording ==
Glassjaw originally formed in 1993 after vocalist Daryl Palumbo and guitarist Justin Beck met each other working for a summer camp. Throughout the next few years, the group issued various demo tapes and EPs and experienced many line up changes. Their line up would eventually stabilize by 1999, featuring bassist Manuel Carrero, guitarist Todd Weinstock, and drummer Sammy Siegler. With this line up, the group booked a recording session with local producer Don Fury, and the demo recording that resulted from it would eventually be heard by producer Ross Robinson. Robinson, impressed by the material, would then show up to a rehearsal, after which he offered them studio time at Indigo Ranch and convinced Roadrunner Records to sign the group.

Recording sessions for the album lasted for about two months total. While all material for the album was written by the band before production began, Robinson did influence arrangements of the tracks "Hurting and Shoving (She Should Have Let Me Sleep)" and the album's title track.

== Lyrics ==
Everything You Ever Wanted to Know About Silence has been noted for its overall angry and negative tone in terms of lyrics. The title track was written about Crohn's disease, an intestinal disorder that Palumbo was diagnosed with in 1996. Many songs on the record were written concerning bad relationships.

The album has been subject to criticism surrounding its misogynistic lyrical undertones, which have prompted various apologies from Daryl Palumbo. In a 2017 article by Pitchfork titled "Unraveling the Sexism of Emo's Third Wave", Jenn Pelly addressed Glassjaw and the song "Pretty Lush" and criticised the band's lyrics for being "embarrassingly spiteful to bluntly-stated violence against women". Following the article's publishing, Palumbo and the band made further statements condemning the lyrics, with Palumbo apologizing for the lyrics in an interview to The Guardian; "[the lyrics] deserve scrutiny. You don't talk to a woman like that. It took being that angry to write [the debut album's lyrics], to make it work for my instrument in the band. I was always like 'Argh, revenge!' Fall in love easily and then fall into hate easily. I didn't have to say it that way … It's stupid, you don't speak face-to-face to a woman like that. I was angry. It's offensive."

== Reception ==
Professional ratings
Review scores
Source	Rating
AbsolutePunk	89%
AllMusic	3.5/5 stars
Detroit Metro Times	3.5/5 stars
Kerrang!	5/5 stars
laut.de	4/5 stars
Metal Hammer	7/10
NME	8/10
Rock Hard	6.5/10

Everything You Ever Wanted to Know About Silence has received generally favorable reviews.

Absolute Punk reviewer Namel praised the songs "Pretty Lush" and "Piano", but said some of the album's songs have "cringe-worthy" lyrics and criticized the track "Babe". In a retrospective review of the album, MetalSucks reviewer Mike Gitter was highly positive of the album. Gitter stated "Glassjaw laid down the bitchslap in-extremis" and regarded the album as a landmark. NME compared the album to "Jeff Buckley doused in napalm, crawling through a room full of broken glass."

=== Legacy ===
Since the album's release, Everything You Ever Wanted To Know About Silence has been seen as an influential album in metal and post-hardcore. Keith Buckley of Every Time I Die has cited the album as an influence, stating on Twitter; "This album changed everything for me." Oli Sykes of Bring Me the Horizon also cited the album as an influence on him, and that it inspired him to become a singer. Journalists Leslie Simon and Trevor Kelley included the album in their list of the most essential emo releases in their book Everybody Hurts: An Essential Guide to Emo Culture (2007). Alternative Press ranked "Pretty Lush" at number 77 on their list of the best 100 singles from the 2000s.

In 2022, Glassjaw have performed the album in its entirety during their 20+ Anniversary Tour.

=== Accolades ===
Publisher	Country	Accolade	Year	Rank
Metal Hammer	United Kingdom	The 10 essential post-hardcore albums	2022	1

== Track listing ==
All lyrics are written by Daryl Palumbo; all music is composed by Glassjaw, except where noted.

No.	Title	Music	Length
1.	"Pretty Lush"		2:59
2.	"Siberian Kiss"		3:50
3.	"When One Eight Becomes Two Zeros"		4:33
4.	"Ry Ry's Song"		3:32
5.	"Lovebites and Razorlines"	Glassjaw; Ross Robinson	4:10
6.	"Hurting and Shoving (She Should Have Let Me Sleep)"	Glassjaw; Robinson	3:28
7.	"Majour"		4:00
8.	"Her Middle Name Was Boom"		4:16
9.	"Piano"		4:59
10.	"Babe"		1:43
11.	"Everything You Ever Wanted to Know About Silence"	Glassjaw; Robinson	5:36
12.	"Motel of the White Locust" "Losten" (hidden track)		8:41

2009 remaster bonus tracks
No.	Title	Music	Length
13.	"Modern Love Story" (Youth of Today cover)	Ray Cappo	1:04
14.	"Convectuoso" (Demo)		4:27

== Personnel ==
Glassjaw

- Daryl Palumbo – vocals
- Justin Beck – guitar
- Todd Weinstock – guitar
- Manuel Carrero – bass guitar
- Sammy Siegler – drums

Additional

- Ross Robinson – production, mixing
- Steve Evetts – mixing
- Chuck Johnson – engineering
- Ted Jensen – mastering
- Kaz Kiriya – band photography
- Paul Brown – image photography

== Use in media ==
- "Siberian Kiss" was featured in the soundtrack for Ginger Snaps (film).

== Charts ==
Chart (2000)	Peak position
UK Albums (OCC)	82
