= Sundowning (This Is Hell album) =

Studio album by This Is Hell
- Released: May 16, 2006
- Genres: Hardcore punk, melodic hardcore
- Labels: Trustkill; Deathwish (DWI53)

This Is Hell chronology
| This Is Hell (2005) | Sundowning (2006) | Cripplers (2007) |

Professional ratings
Review scores
| Source | Rating |
|---|---|
| Rockmidgets.com | 5/5 stars |

Sundowning is the debut full-length album by Long Island hardcore punk band This Is Hell. The success of the album landed This Is Hell in the "100 Bands You Need To Know for 2006" in popular music magazine Alternative Press. Daryl Palumbo lends his vocals to the track "Procession Commence" and it is the second time Palumbo has provided guest vocals for a This Is Hell release.

== Track listing ==
1. "Retrospect" - 1:01
2. "Prelude (Again)" - 2:30
3. "Here Come the Rains" - 2:26
4. "Permanence" - 4:05
5. "4/8/05" - 0:28
6. "The Polygraph Cheaters" - 2:29
7. "Deliver Me" - 1:03
8. "The Absentee Ballot" - 1:49
9. "Broken Teeth" - 3:21
10. "8/27/05" - 2:08
11. "Procession Commence" - 2:19
12. "Nobody Leaves Without Singing the Blues" - 1:55
13. "Epilogue" - 2:52

== Personnel ==
- Travis Reilly - vocals
- Rick Jimenez - guitar and vocals
- Jeff Tiu - bass
- Dan Bourke - drums
- Joe Osolin - guitar
