= Black Mass (album) =

Studio album by This Is Hell
- Released: October 11, 2011
- Recorded: Mid 2011 at Killingsworth Studio in Valley Village, California
- Genre: Crossover thrash
- Length: 34:43
- Label: Rise (RR145)
- Producer: Tomas Costanza

This Is Hell chronology
Weight of the World (2010)	Black Mass (2011)

Professional ratings
Review scores
Source	Rating
AbsolutePunk	(71%)
Big Cheese	(4/5)
Blabbermouth.net	(7.5)
Metal Blast	(4/5)

Black Mass is the fourth studio album by the American rock band This Is Hell. The album was released on October 11, 2011 through Rise Records.

== Marketing and promotion ==
In early August 2011, a viral marketing website titled allrisefortheblackmass.com was created. The website, described as a "mysterious teaser" site for an "unknown event" in a press release, featured nothing but a countdown timer set to go off on October 11, 2011. About three weeks later on August 28, the website was revealed to be a promotion for a new album by This Is Hell titled Black Mass. The album's title track was made available for streaming online on August 31, and "Salt the Earth" was available on September 15.

This Is Hell's first tour in support of Black Mass will be a late 2011 North American tour opening for Underoath, Comeback Kid and The Chariot.

== Track listing ==
All songs written by This is Hell.

1. "Acid Rain"
2. "Black History"
3. "Salt the Earth"
4. "Black Mass"
5. "The Wars: Part One"
6. "Mi Nombre"
7. "The Last Outlaw"
8. "Demons"
9. "The Reckoning"
10. "The Wars: Part Two"
