= Patrick Hoelck =

American filmmaker and photographer

Patrick Hoelck (born September 7, 1968) is an American filmmaker and photographer based in Los Angeles and New York City. He is known for his work in fine art, advertising photography, and music video direction.

== Career ==
Patrick Hoelck began directing music videos in his mid-teens in New York City amid the emerging hip-hop scene. By his late teens, he had already produced work with early hip-hop artists before relocating to Los Angeles to expand his commercial and narrative filmmaking engagements.

He transitioned into photography during the early 2000s. His self‑published book Tar (1999) blends autobiographical prose and candid portraiture capturing his experiences with addiction and recovery.

Hoelck also produced Paul Thomas Anderson's early short film Cigarettes & Coffee (1993), which received attention for its unconventional storytelling in independent film circles.

In 2009, he directed the independent feature Mercy, with screenplay and lead role by Scott Caan. The film premiered at the Gen Art Film Festival, and Hoelck was awarded Best Director at the Savannah Film Festival.

By 2011, Hoelck had released the analog photography project Polaroid Hotel, drawn from 17 years of Polaroid exposure at the Standard Hotel in New York. The work was later exhibited in Los Angeles and praised for presenting raw, intimate cultural narratives in everyday urban environments.

== Exhibitions ==
- 2010 – TAR, Dittrich & Schlechtriem (solo), Berlin, Germany.
- 2017 – Atop the Mountain Ignoring the View, New Image Art (solo), Los Angeles, CA, USA.

In 2011, Hoelck released a series of Polaroid photos entitled Polaroid Hotel. The photos were taken over the course of seventeen years, largely at the Standard Hotel in New York City. The series was first a book and later an exhibit, which had 700 visitors on its opening day. In Polaroid Hotel, Hoelck presents Polaroid photography as an art form, documenting his life and career. Gisela Getty said about the series, "Hoelck's images seem at first to be random, thrown together, an accidental assemblage, but they provide a narrative of our cultural landscape, a series on contemporary urban life." Art in America interviewed Hoelck about the series.

Hoelck and photographer Michael Muller started a program called Photo School together. Photo School is a series of online tutorial videos on topics such as camera phone photography and complex lighting techniques. Hoelck and Muller wanted to fill a void in traditional photography education and connect a community of photographers.

== Filmography ==
- Cigarettes & Coffee (1993) – Producer
- Mercy (2009) – Director

=== Music videos and commercials ===
- Alicia Keys – "Girlfriend"
- BB Jay – "Hot Ta' Def"
- Beenie Man – "Dancehall Queen"
- Ben Harper – "Please Bleed"
- Blindside – "All of Us"
- Bonnie McKee – "Sleepwalker"
- Calvin Richardson – "Not Like This"
- Cults – "Go Outside"
- Deftones – "Be Quiet and Drive (Far Away)"
- DJ Quik – "Pitch In on a Party"
- Esthero – "That Girl"
- Glassjaw – "Cosmopolitan Bloodloss"
- Linda Király – "Can't Let Go"
- Lisa Marie Presley – "Dirty Laundry"
- Lisa Marie Presley – "Idiot"
- Local H – "Pack Up the Cats"
- Oliver Peoples 2013 campaign video – Stage 9
- Raven-Symoné – "Double Dutch Bus"
- Skye Sweetnam – "Billy S."
- Yellowcard – "Way Away"
