= Anterrabae =

American metalcore/hardcore punk band from Long Island, NY

- Origin: Long Island, New York, U.S.
- Genres: metalcore hardcore punk
- Years active: 2000 - 2008
- Label: Triple Crown Records
- Members: Erik Boccio; Joseph Spagna; Anthony DiMaggio; Ryan Poelker
- Past members: Neal Carter; Matt Gorton; Chris Gleason; Dan Bianco; Gavin Donnelly; Eric Montalvo
- Website: Anterrabae.com (recently down)

Anterrabae was an American metalcore/hardcore punk band from Long Island, New York, United States. Their first album, Shakedown Tonight, was released in March 2004. Their second studio album, And Our Heart Beat in Our Fingertips, Without Reason came out in June 2006. In the beginning of 2008, they announced two shows with former singer Neal Carter on April 11, 2008, in Connecticut, and 13, in New Jersey. Anterrabae played their final show at Traxx in Long Island, New York on December 22, 2008, with original vocalist Neal Carter; until two reunion shows at the Amityville Music Hall on May 24 and 25, 2014.

Guitarist Joey Spagna has gone on to play with 2 Long Island bands, Shepherds and Heart of a Lion. Bassist Anthony Dimaggio has gone on to play with Long Island band Mt. Mourning. Chris Gleason is currently playing drums in Ice Age. Erik Boccio is currently playing alongside former members of bands Every Time I Die and Buried Alive in the band Kid Gorgeous.

== Discography ==
| Title | Year | Label |
|---|---|---|
| I'm Sorry is Never Enough | 2001 | Self-Released |
| 631: A Long Island Hardcore Compilation Vol. 1 | 2003 | Pride Recordz |
| Shakedown Tonight | 2004 | Triple Crown Records |
| And Our Heart Beat In Our Fingertips, Without Reason | 2006 | Triple Crown Records |
