= Cripplers (EP) =

EP by This Is Hell
- Released: November 14, 2007
- Recorded: Killingsworth Recording Co., Atomic Recording Co.
- Genre: Hardcore punk
- Length: 10:07
- Label: Trustkill

This Is Hell chronology
Sundowning (2006)	Cripplers (2007)	Misfortunes (2008)

Cripplers is a limited vinyl only 7-inch EP by the hardcore punk band This Is Hell. It features cover songs, unreleased songs, and one new song "Infected" later to be featured on their 2008 album Misfortunes. However, this track is an earlier recording and sounds slightly different from the track found on Misfortunes.

== Track listing ==
Side F

1. "Infected" (Early recording) – 2:44
2. "Do Something" (Originally by CIV) – 1:20
3. "Fight for Your Right" (Originally by Beastie Boys) – 3:04

Side U

1. "Another Facade" (Unreleased song) – 0:59
2. "Double Grave" (Unreleased song) – 1:25
3. "I Hope You Die Soon" (Originally by The Movielife) – 0:35

== Pressing details ==
Limited quantities were pressed in a variety of colors.

- Black/Clear Splatter (Hand Screened) x100
- Red/Orange Swirl x200
- Yellow x300
- Black/White Swirl x400
- Red/Yellow x500
- Clear/Black Splatter x500

== Personnel ==
- Travis Reilly - Vocals
- Rick Jimenez - Guitar & Backing Vocals
- Chris Reynolds - Guitar
- Johnny Moore - Bass
- Dan Bourke - Drums
- Tomas Costanza & Dean Baltulons - Recording
- Logo designed by Jeff Tiu
- Photography by Matt Miller
- Layout by Raging $kull
