= Men, Women & Children (album) =

Studio album by Men, Women & Children
- Released: March 21, 2006
- Genre: Electropop, dance-rock, nu-disco
- Length: 41:31
- Label: Reprise
- Producer: Men, Women & Children; Mike Mogis; Raine Maida; Jason Lader; Josh Abraham

Professional ratings
Review scores
Source	Rating
Allmusic	4.0/5 stars

Men, Women & Children is the debut and only studio album released by the Long Island-based dance-rock band Men, Women & Children. The opening track, "Dance in My Blood", was released as the album's only single and also featured a music video.

== Track listing ==
1. "Dance in My Blood" – 4:18
2. "Lightning Strikes Twice in New York" – 3:13
3. "Photosynthesis (We're Losing O²)" – 3:14
4. "Who Found Mister Fabulous?" – 3:48
5. "Messy" – 3:22
6. "At Night We Like to Fight" – 3:48
7. "Monkey Monkee Men" – 2:24
8. "Time for the Future (Bang Bang)" – 3:19
9. "The Name of the Train is the Hurricane" – 3:37
10. "¡Celebracion!" – 3:34
11. "Sell Your Money" – 3:30
12. "Vowels" – 3:24
- All music by Men, Women & Children
- Lyrics by TJ Penzone
- Additional lyrics by Todd Weinstock

== Personnel ==
- Nick Conceller - keyboards, programming, synthesizer, production
- David "Scully" Sullivan-Kaplan - drums, production
- Rick Penzone - bass guitar, guitar, keyboard, synthesizer, additional percussion, string composition, production
- TJ Penzone - vocals, production
- Todd Weinstock - guitars, production
- Nathaniel Walcott - string/horn arrangements
- Micky Petralia - additional programming
- Lenny Castro - percussion
- Chantal Kreviazuk - additional vocals on Monkey Monkee Men
- Danny Kalb - engineering
- Ryan Williams - engineering
- AJ Mogis - engineering
- Rudyard Lee Cullers - mix engineer
- Mike Sapone - pre-production, additional recording
- Sean McCabe - art direction, photography, design
- Dave Winchell - photography, insert design
- Josh Abraham - additional production on Dance In My Blood, Monkey Monkee Men
- Mike Mogis - additional production on Lighting Strikes Twice In New York, At Night We Like To Fight, Time For The Future (Bang Bang), The Name Of The Train Is The Hurricane, ¡Celebracion!, Sell Your Money
- Raine Maida - additional production on Photosynthesis (We're Losing O_{2}), Who Found Mister Fabulous?, Messy, Vowels
- Jason Lader - additional production on Photosynthesis (We're Losing O_{2}), Who Found Mister Fabulous?, Messy, Vowels
- Alan Moulder - mixing on Dance In My Blood
- Gareth Jones - mixing on tracks 2–12
