= This Is Hell Demo =

EP by This Is Hell
- Released: 2004
- Genre: Hardcore punk
- Length: 6:45
- Labels: Run for Cover, Broken Glasses

This Is Hell chronology
This Is Hell Demo (2004)	This Is Hell EP (2005)

This Is Hell Demo was the very first physical release of songs recorded by hardcore punk band This Is Hell. The album was untitled and released on both CD and 7" vinyl formats, also in Europe on Broken Glasses Records (distributed by NO PANIC! Records now). All formats are out of print and difficult to find. The song "Wreck Your Life" was later released on a label sampler cd from Trustkill, the label that This Is Hell later signed to and released their debut full length "Sundowning," but not before a stint on State On Mind Recordings who released their self-titled EP. On that same song, the opening line of the lyric includes the band's name, and was possibly the inspiration for the name. The lyric reads: "Brandon put it best when he told me 'this is hell,' wiser words have never been said."

It received positive reviews from at least one source, and they played over 200 shows in one year in support of this demo.

== Track listing ==
1. "Wreck Your Life" – 2:07
2. "Heaven Sent, Hell Bound" – 1:30
3. "Double Grave" – 1:22
4. "Dearest Midge" – 1:52

== Personnel ==
- Travis Reilly – vocals
- Rick Jimenez – guitar and vocals
- Jeff Tiu – bass
- Dan Bourke – drums
- Joe Osolin – guitar
