= Jonathan Florencio =

American musician (born 1976)

- Born: Jonathan Martinez Florencio; July 21, 1976 (age 49)
- Origin: Bellmore, Wantagh, Long Island, Queens, New York, U.S.
- Genres: Alternative rock, Electronic Music, post-hardcore, experimental rock, progressive rock, hardcore punk, power pop, pop rock, classical
- Occupations: Composer, Producer, Songwriter, Musician, Audio Engineer
- Instruments: Guitar, Bass guitar, Drums, Music Sequencer, Keyboard, Pro Tools
- Years active: 1996–present
- Label: Produkt Sound
- Website: www.produktsound.com, www.jonflorencio.com

Jonathan Martinez Florencio (Jon 'Flo' Florencio, born July 21, 1976) is an American composer, audio engineer and record producer. He is of Filipino descent and was raised in Bellmore, New York and attended Mepham High School. He has composed music for various commercials including Hummer, Nike, Scion, Calvin Klein, Mercedes, Rolex, Yves Saint Lauren, Pepsi and MTV. He has also worked with acts such as Ours, Glassjaw, Jimmy Gnecco, The Movielife, Dearly Departed, The Washdown, Anterrabae, and Woods. His production technique is notable for its width, innovative textures, and deconstructive approach to production.

In 2010 he worked on Jimmy Gnecco's debut solo-album The Heart (album). That same year, Florencio mixed three songs for The Narrative's self-titled album, as well as co-produced/engineered the Glassjaw EPs Our Color Green (The Singles) and Coloring Book.

== Awards ==
Florencio won the First Boards Awards 2004 for his first year's work as a composer. He also went on to win the 2004 London International Award for Best Original Music Scoring on a Calvin Klein commercial featuring Scarlett Johansson.

In 2008, Jonathan mixed select tracks for Ours, Mercy (Dancing for the Death of an Imaginary Enemy) album, produced by Rick Rubin. The album was credited for Grammy Awards 'Producer Of The Year-Rick Rubin 2008'.

Jonathan's music was featured during the 2016 Super Bowl 50 broadcast.
