= This Is Hell (band) =

American hardcore punk band

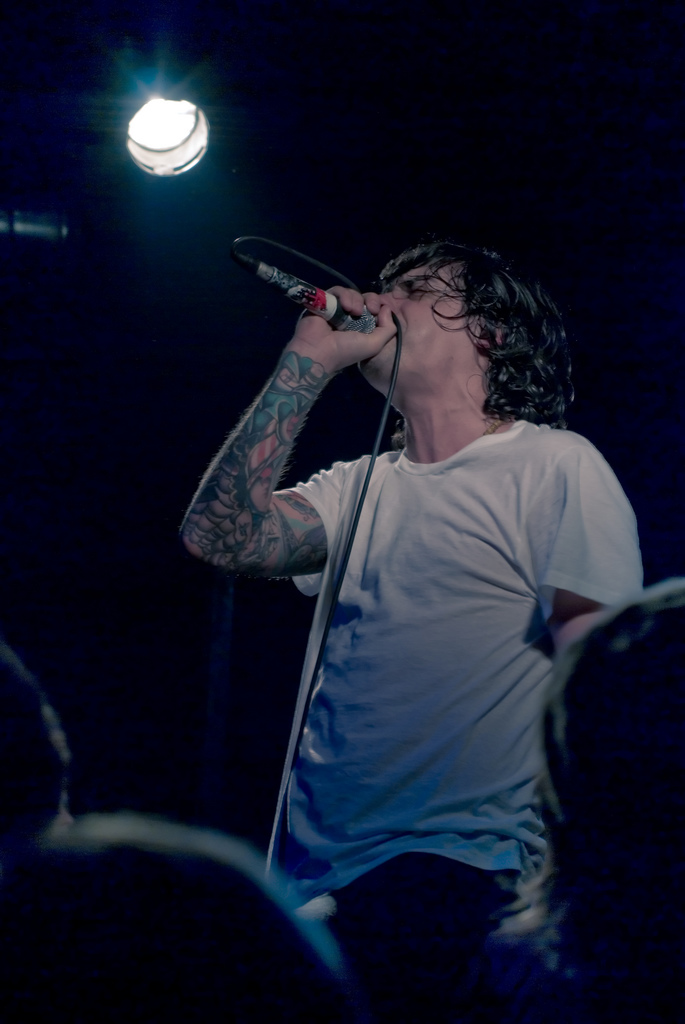
- Vocalist Travis Reilly performing live in Berlin, 2009

Background information
- Origin: Long Island, New York, U.S.
- Genres: Hardcore punk, crossover thrash, melodic hardcore
- Years active: 2004–present
- Labels: Rise, Trustkill, State of Mind
- Members: Travis Reilly; Rick Jimenez; Pieter Vandenberg; Mike Sciulara; Christian Beale
- Past members: Jeff Tiu; Joe Osolin; Chris Reynolds; Dan Bourke; Johnny Moore; Andrew Jones; Benny Meade

This Is Hell is an American hardcore punk band from Long Island, New York. The band is known for extensive touring and high energy concerts. They have released four studio albums and seven EPs.

== History ==
=== Early days and formation (2004) ===
This Is Hell formed in June 2004 when Long Island musicians and members of The Backup Plan, Scraps and Heart Attacks, and Subterfuge got together after their previous bands broke up. The name of the band was originally the title of an Elvis Costello song. The band quickly released a four-song self titled demo EP which was later pressed onto vinyl via Boston label Run for Cover Records and in Europe via Broken Glasses Records. Pressings of the EP sold out quickly and was very well received. The demo gained enough popularity to later be reissued. In support of this demo, the band played over 200 live shows in one year.

=== First EP and Sundowning (2005–2007) ===
After the release of their demo and in between touring, the band started working on their next release, a self titled EP. It was released on May 16, 2005, on State of Mind Records. Later that year, the band caught the attention of hardcore punk record label Trustkill Records. The president of Trustkill, Josh Grabelle, stated:

Originally, I liked their work ethic, they were out there working really hard, doing things that a lot bands wouldn't do without a bigger record deal, for example touring Europe and putting an EP out. When I went to see them, I got the amazing feeling that I used to get watching hardcore bands a really long time ago, something I haven't felt in years. Travis' stage presence was amazing, and I knew they had something. I approached them pretty much out of the blue and signed them.

— Josh Grabelle,

The band signed to Trustkill shortly after that, and began to work on their debut album Sundowning to be released on their new label. In May 2006 the album was released and received a very warm reception. Larger magazines including Alternative Press, Metal Hammer, and Rock Sound started featuring the small-time Long Island band, creating a rise in popularity. Their slow rise to fame was also due to their non-stop touring. In 2006 and 2007, This Is Hell participated in the Sounds of the Underground tour which rivaled Ozzfest. In this tour they played alongside As I Lay Dying, Trivium, In Flames, Gwar, Shadows Fall, Every Time I Die and others. In 2006, they were invited to play in the Taste of Chaos tour and the Saints & Sinners Festival. During this time This Is Hell also toured with Comeback Kid, Endwell, It Dies Today, Parkway Drive, Cancer Bats, Glassjaw, Lostprophets, Bayside, and several others.

In April 2006, This Is Hell members Rick Jimenez and Dan Bourke were interested in starting a side project. The two started recruiting local hardcore punk musicians from Long Island and soon formed Soldiers. The band went on to independently release The Tombstone EP, and a full-length album, The End of Days, through Trustkill Records. Soldiers has played live with This Is Hell on a few tours. For these shows, Jimenez and Bourke would play in both bands each night.

After the amicable departure of bassist/lyricist Jeff Tiu and the parting of ways with guitarist Joe Osolin, Johnny Moore (ex-Subterfuge, ex-Asternaut) took over on bass as well as becoming the main lyricist, and Chris Reynolds took over second guitar duties. Jeff Tiu went on to front LIHC band Ice Age with Chris Mazella (ex-Subterfuge, current Soldiers) on guitar.

Before the close of 2007, This Is Hell released two more EPs exclusively on 7" vinyl records. The first EP, titled Cripplers (EP) featured cover songs, unreleased songs, and one brand new song. The new song called "Infected" was later found on the band's second studio album, but was added to this EP to give fans a taste before the release of the new album. The second EP was a split record with Cancer Bats. This EP featured one new song from each band and one cover of the other band.

=== Misfortunes (2008–2009) ===
After several years of non stop touring with larger bands on festival tours, and smaller bands on underground tours, This Is Hell gathered much inspiration for their second studio album titled Misfortunes. With this album, the band created a new more aggressive and raw sound not found on previous efforts. Only a few days after the release the band embarked on their first headlining tour, which included a full US tour followed by a small European tour. After the Euro tour, Chris Reynolds left the band to pursue his project Kill the Frontman and returned to life in upstate New York. The band did a short US/Canadian tour, now as a four-piece, with Blacklisted, although Blacklisted did not make it across the border into Canada.

In October, a small "early press" of the This Is Hell/Nightmare of You split 7" was released. From the fall of 2008 to early winter of 2009, This Is Hell did more touring throughout the United States with bands of all genres: October/November with Four Year Strong, I Am the Avalanche and A Loss for Words; November with Gravemaker; December with Evergreen Terrace, Four Letter Lie and Casey Jones; January/February with Funeral for a Friend, the Sleeping and Emarosa. After the last mentioned tour, Dan Bourke left the band and joined fellow Long Island group Stray from the Path. Dennis Wilson took over on drums for a Europe headlining tour with Dead Swans and The Blackout Argument.

=== Weight of the World, Black Mass, Bastards Still Remain (2010–2024) ===
This Is Hell mutually split with their label, Trustkill Records, and signed with Rise Records. With new recruits Andrew Jones (bass) and Benny Mead (drums) they released an EP through Think Fast! Records in 2009 called Warbirds. The EP featured covers and new songs, some of which would later appear on their third studio album Weight of the World, which was released on June 8, 2010, through Rise Records.

October 11, 2011, saw the release of This Is Hell's fourth full-length studio album, Black Mass. The band released the album Bastards Still Remain in 2016.

=== Return to Trustkill Records (2025-present) ===
In early 2026, it was announced that This Is Hell would return to Trustkill Records, who will release their new EP Born Suspicious on May 15, 2026.

== Band members ==
=== Current members ===
- Travis Reilly – vocals (2004–present)
- Rick Jimenez – guitar (2004–present)
- Tom Wood – bass (2013–present)
- Mike Sciulara – drums (2011–present)

=== Former members ===
- Jeff Tiu – bass (2004–2006)
- Joe Osolin – guitar (2004–2006)
- Chris Reynolds – guitar (2006–2008) (joined Kill The Frontman)
- Dan Bourke – drums (2004–2009) (joined Stray from the Path)
- John Moore – bass (2006–2009)
- Andrew Jones – bass (2009–2010)
- Benny Mead – drums (2009–2010)
- Chris Mazella – guitar (2010–2011)
- Pieter van den Berg – bass (2010–2013)

=== Touring members ===
- Andrew Jones – drums (during winter 2004 tour)
- Travis Paduano – guitar (during winter 2004 tour)
- Dennis Wilson – drums (during spring 2009 European tour)

Timeline

== Discography ==
=== Studio albums ===
- 2006: Sundowning (Trustkill)
- 2008: Misfortunes (Trustkill)
- 2010: Weight of the World (Rise)
- 2011: Black Mass (Rise)

=== EPs ===
- 2004: This Is Hell Demo 7" (Run for Cover and Broken Glasses Records)
- 2005: This Is Hell (State of Mind)
- 2007: Cripplers 7" (Trustkill)
- 2009: Warbirds 7" (Think Fast!)
- 2013: The Enforcer
- 2016: Bastards Still Remain
- 2026: Born Suspicious

=== Splits ===
- 2007: This Is Hell / Cancer Bats 7" (Future Tense)
- 2008: This Is Hell / Nightmare of You 7" (Run for Cover)

=== Singles ===
- 2010: "Rat Race" (Rise)
- 2010: "Dawn Patrol", Megadeth cover recorded in 2008 by Rick Jimenez and Johny Moore; released as a bandcamp.com exclusive

=== Music videos ===
- "The Polygraph Cheaters" (2006)
- "Permanence" (live) (2006)
- "Reckless" (2008)
- "The Search" (2010)
- "Bloodlines" (2010)
- "Demons" (2012)
- "Acid Rain" (2012)
- "The Enforcer" (2013)

=== Compilation contributions ===
- 2006: Trustkill Takeover Vol. II (Trustkill)
  - Contributed song "Wreck Your Life"
- 2006: Smithtown & Friends Vol. II (Pride)
  - Contributed song "Double Grave"
- 2007: Sounds of the Underground 2007 Compilation (limited Hot Topic exclusive)
  - Contributed song "Permanence"
- 2009: Carry the Torch: A Tribute to Kid Dynamite (Black Numbers)
  - Contributed song "Troy's Bucket" (Kid Dynamite cover)
- 2009: "Dimebag", Darrell Abbott tribute album (Metal Hammer exclusive)
  - Contributed song "Rise" (Pantera cover)
