= Daryl Palumbo =

American musician (born 1979)

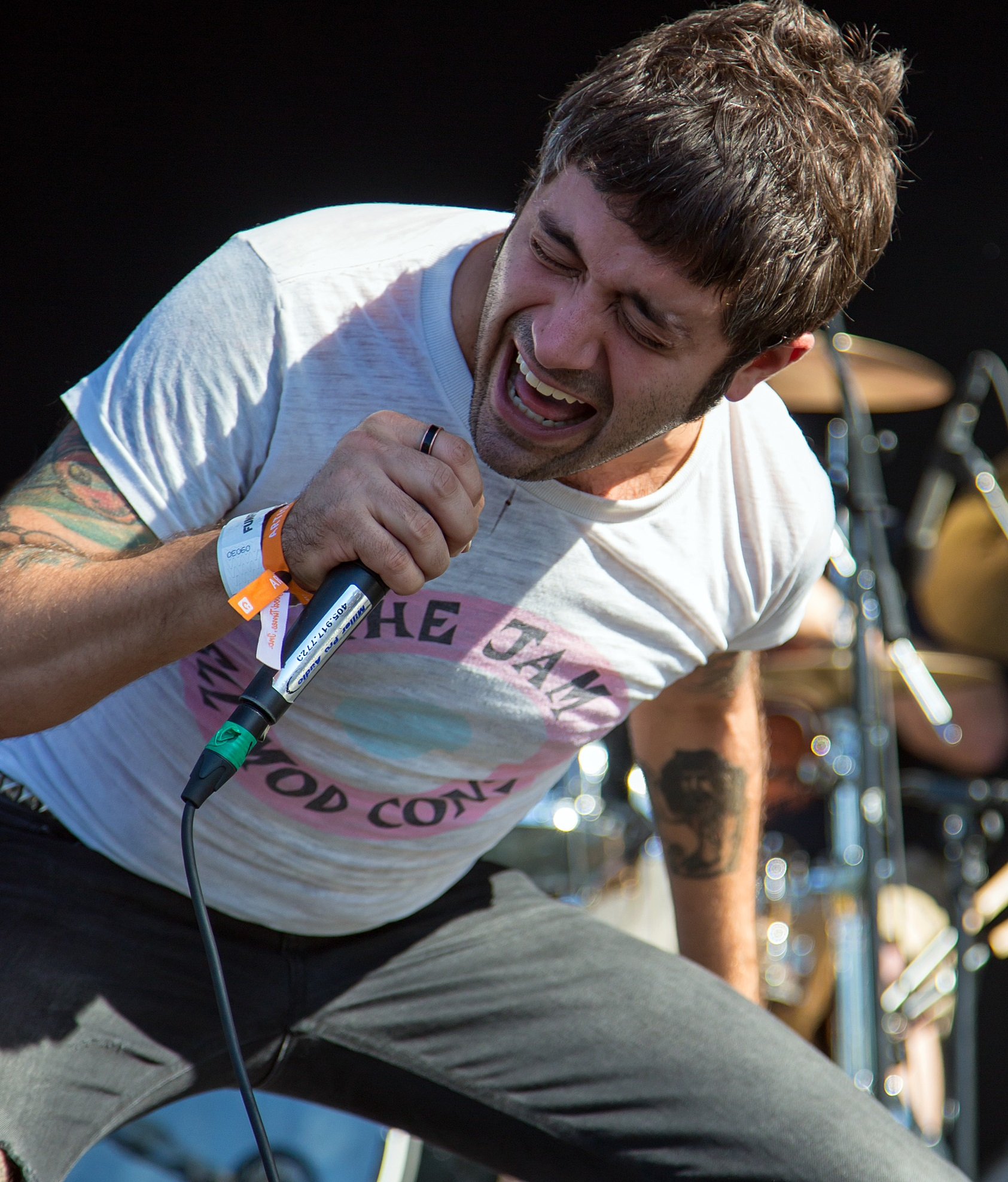
- Palumbo performing with Glassjaw in 2014

Background information
- Born: Daryl Palumbo; February 10, 1979 (age 47)
- Origin: Bellmore, New York, New York, United States
- Genres: Alternative rock; post-hardcore; experimental rock; hardcore punk; power pop; pop rock; nu metal (early)
- Occupations: Singer, songwriter, musician
- Instruments: Vocals, guitar, keyboard
- Years active: 1993–present
- Labels: I Am; Roadrunner; Warner Bros.; Epitaph; Century Media; AML
- Formerly of: Glassjaw; Head Automatica; Color Film; United Nations

Daryl Palumbo (born February 10, 1979) is an American musician, originally from Bellmore, New York. He is the frontman of the bands Glassjaw, Head Automatica and Color Film. As a youth he was a member of the Long Island straight edge band XbustedX. In 1993 he met guitarist Justin Beck, who would become his good friend. Together they formed Glassjaw.

Palumbo has Crohn's disease, which has acted as inspiration for much of his musical output, most notably in the lyrical content of Glassjaw's major label debut Everything You Ever Wanted to Know About Silence. His condition has affected his bands' ability to tour, including the cancellation of a tour with The Used in 2005.

== Collaborations ==
Palumbo has worked with many different artists including Alien Ant Farm (performing live with them on their cover of Bad Brains' "Gene Machine"), The Movielife (on the track, "Another Friend"), Ray Cappo (on Glassjaw's cover of the Youth of Today song, "Modern Love Story"), The Rondo Brothers (on the tracks "Hey Stewardess", "Whispering Reef", and "Take Me Back"), Silent Majority (on the track "Popular Opinion"), Every Time I Die (on the track "Champing at the Bit" from Gutter Phenomenon), Finch (on the tracks "Project Mayhem" and "Grey Matter" from What It Is to Burn), Cage Kennylz (on the track "Shoot Frank" from Hell's Winter) and Dan the Automator's Handsome Boy Modeling School. In interviews Palumbo has expressed an interest to work with British singer/songwriter and producer Nick Lowe. In 2004, Palumbo made a brief appearance in the Lostprophets music video for their track "Last Summer", alongside Head Automatica bassist Jarvis Holden. In October 2005, Palumbo appeared as a guest vocalist on the track, "No Way Out" on the album Roadrunner United: The All Star Sessions. The album was a collaboration between past and current bands signed to Roadrunner Records. This release was significant as it showed a new, positive attitude towards the label from Palumbo. Previously, he and Justin Beck had voiced negative statements regarding the label relating to their treatment by Roadrunner and subsequent move to Warner Bros.

Palumbo also provided guest vocals on the track "Procession Commence" on the 2006 album Sundowning by the Long Island hardcore punk band This Is Hell. He also provided backing vocals on their previous EP.

Palumbo was also a judge for the 8th annual Independent Music Awards, to support independent artists.

Palumbo contributed guitar, bass and synthesizer to, and also co-produced Cold Cave's second full-length album, Cherish the Light Years.

Palumbo announced on his Twitter account that he and friend/ex-Men, Women and Children member Rick Penzone were entering the mixing stages of their first LP with a new project, called Color Film. The duo were featured on the track "It's A Sin" off of Nick Hook's Without You EP. On October 18, 2012, Color Film played their first show at Irving Plaza, New York. Along with the announcement of the show, the band's site went online, revealing their debut full-length details and a download of the track "52 Minds" in exchange for a scratch off ticket code. The album, titled Living Arrangements, was produced by the duo and mixed by Gareth Jones and was expected for a 2013 release. "Bad Saint", another track from the record, is available for streaming and download on Color Film SoundCloud page.

In April 2013, Palumbo released an electro house track titled "Don't Leave Me".

September 2013 saw the release of "It's A Sin" video by Nick Hook featuring Color Film.

Color Film released their debut EP Until You Turn Blue on October 22, 2013, on Calm + Collect. The band also released a live video for their track "Small Town".

Color Film released their debut album Living Arrangements on June 16, 2017.

Glassjaw released their long-awaited follow up to 2002's Worship & Tribute on December 1, 2017, titled Material Control.

== Discography ==
The following is an incomplete discography:

with Glassjaw

- Kiss Kiss Bang Bang (1997)
- Everything You Ever Wanted to Know About Silence (2000)
- Worship and Tribute (2002)
- Our Color Green (The Singles) (2010)
- Coloring Book (Glassjaw EP) (2011)
- Material Control (2017)

with Head Automatica

- Decadence (2004)
- Popaganda (2006)
- Swan Damage (recorded in 2009, unreleased)

with Debracadabra

- XXX (2004)

with United Nations

- United Nations (2008)

with Color Film

- Until You Turn Blue EP (2013)
- Living Arrangements (2017)

== Other recording projects ==
- "City of Cardboard" by Proximity Minds (vocals)
- "Another Friend" by The Movielife (backing vocals)
- "Hey Stewardess", "Whispering Reef" and "Take Me Back" by The Rondo Brothers (vocals)
- "Popular Opinion" by Silent Majority (backing vocals)
- "Champing at the Bit" by Every Time I Die (vocals)
- "Project Mayhem" and "Grey Matter" by Finch (vocals/writing)
- "Shoot Frank" by Cage (vocals)
- "No Way Out" featuring Daryl Palumbo, Matt Baumbach, Junkie XL, and Joey Jordison. On the Roadrunner United: The All Star Sessions album (vocals)
- "Procession Commence" and "When Death Closes Your Eyes" (108 cover) by This Is Hell (backing vocals)
- "The Overly Dramatic Truth" by El-P (keys, backing vocals)
- "Still Don't Know Your Name" and "So Physical" by We Are the Fury
- "Leopard Prints and Studded Belts" by thisyearsmodel (backing vocals)
- "Cherish The Light Years" by Cold Cave (guitar, bass, synthesizer and production)
- "Dead Celebrities Are Amusing" and "More Saints Less Musicians" by Christiansen (backing vocals)
- "Fuck Me (Daryl Palumbo Remix)" by Camu Tao
- "Choose Your Adventure (Daryl Palumbo Remix)" by Rival Schools
- "Shoot Frank (Remix)" by Cage
- "The Bronze Jade" by Staircase Spirit (production, guitar, backing vocals)
- "Amen!" by Bring Me the Horizon featuring Lil Uzi Vert and Daryl Palumbo
- "Message Like A Bomb" by Koyo (vocals)
- Itchy To Move EP by EX PRESS (production, backing vocals on "Headrest" and "Big Figure")

== See also ==
- List of people diagnosed with Crohn's disease
