= Glassjaw =

American post-hardcore band

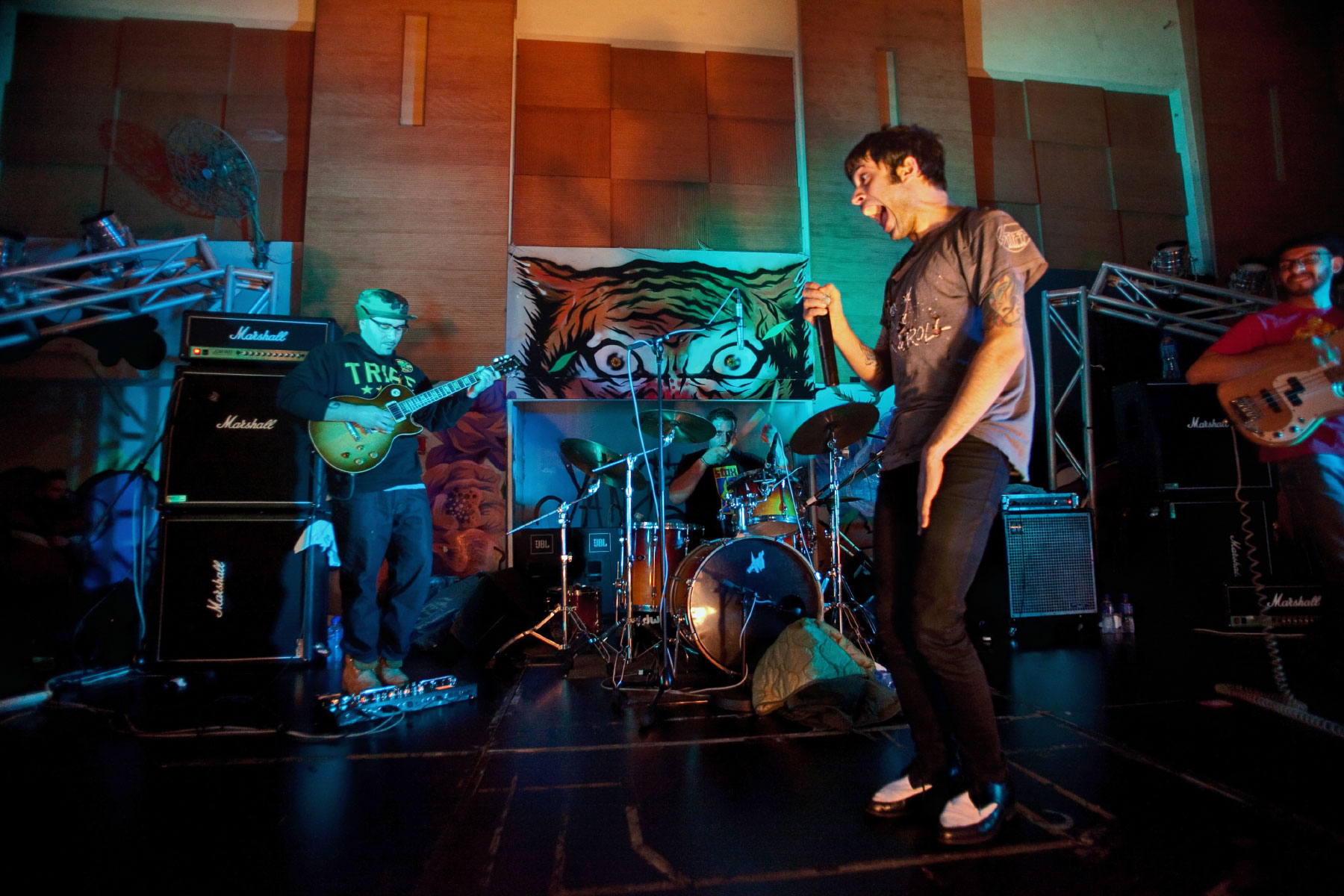
- Glassjaw performing in Hong Kong, 2010

Background information
- Also known as: Glass Jaw (1993–1997); The Glassjaw (1997–1998); Glass X Jaw; The Glass Jaw; xGlassjawx
- Origin: Hempstead, New York, U.S.
- Genres: Post-hardcore; alternative metal; nu metal (early)
- Years active: 1993–present
- Labels: I Am; Roadrunner; Warner Bros.; Century Media; AML
- Spinoffs: Sons of Abraham, Head Automatica
- Members: Daryl Palumbo; Justin Beck; Chad Hasty
- Past members: See Band members section
- Website: glassjaw.com

Glassjaw is an American post-hardcore band from Hempstead, New York. It was formed in 1993 by vocalist Daryl Palumbo and guitarist Justin Beck. The band is known for their intense live shows, as well as their frequent line-up changes. Despite their limited commercial success and small discography, they are considered to be one of the most influential bands in the progression of the underground music scene in the eastern United States and United Kingdom for the post-hardcore genre.

After recording a number of EPs and demos throughout the 1990s, Glassjaw came to the attention of producer Ross Robinson, who helped the band secure a deal with Roadrunner Records. Robinson went on to produce Glassjaw's debut album, Everything You Ever Wanted to Know About Silence (2000), which helped the band cement a following in the United Kingdom. After parting ways with Roadrunner following a feud, Glassjaw signed with Warner Bros. Records, who issued the group's second outing Worship and Tribute (2002). The album reached number 82 on the Billboard 200 chart and brought Glassjaw to mainstream attention, although its supporting tour was negatively affected by Palumbo's struggles with Crohn's disease around this time, leading to the cancellation of several dates. Although the group continued to tour semi-regularly, Glassjaw's studio activity was sporadic for the rest of the 2000s whilst Palumbo and Beck focused other projects.

After parting ways with Warner Bros., Glassjaw self-released a series of 7" singles throughout late 2010, which were later compiled into the EP Our Color Green (The Singles) in January 2011. One month afterwards, the group released another EP, Coloring Book. In 2017, Glassjaw released their first album in 15 years, Material Control, through Century Media Records. During 2022, the band performed a series of concerts commemorating the 20th anniversaries of the band's first two albums.

== History ==
=== Early years (1993–1998) ===
The band formed in the summer of 1993 after Palumbo and Beck met each other at camp. Of the band name, Beck has said: "We had a list of names, and we were just like, let's pick one of these band names which ones the coolest. At the time there were a bunch of bands coming out with two names in one like that, like Mouthpiece, Curbjaw, stuff like that. We were going down the list, and the first name that I liked was Swiftkick. I'm all like, that's a sick name. But for some reason Glassjaw stuck. There's really no reason behind it; it just sounded cool." Upon first founding, the band's name was xGlassjawx, and then The Glassjaw, before ultimately shortening it to Glassjaw.

The band played their first show in 1994 in Oceanside, New York. In the early days, Beck and Weinstock were also playing with Jewish straight edge metalcore band, Sons of Abraham, who were cited as influences on Glassjaw. Palumbo was in his own straight-edge band called XbustedX. The group's line-up changed constantly in their early years while they played in the local New York hardcore scene. Beck's primarily played drums at first, but switched to bass guitar after Ariel Telford left the band in 1998, and then switched to lead guitar when Kris Baldwin left and Manuel Carrero joined the band in 1999.

From 1994 to 1999 the band did several demo recordings of some songs that would eventually appear on their official releases, as well as several other compositions that would not see official release. The band recorded the five-song Kiss Kiss Bang Bang EP in 1997. The record was released independently on the label 2 Cents a Pop, and saw a re-release in 2001 without label affiliation. The line-up on this record was Daryl Palumbo, Justin Beck, Todd Weinstock, Kris Baldwin and Ariel Telford. "Star Above My Bed", from the EP, is still in the band's set lists to this day. A significant recording came in 1999 working with Don Fury (Quicksand, Snapcase, Orange 9mm, The Hearing Aides), showcasing songs that appeared on their debut LP Everything You Ever Wanted to Know About Silence.

=== Everything You Ever Wanted to Know About Silence (1999–2000) ===
In 1999, the band entered the studio at Indigo Ranch in Malibu, California, with producer Ross Robinson (At the Drive-In, Korn, Limp Bizkit, Slipknot, among others) to record their first full-length album titled Everything You Ever Wanted to Know About Silence, which saw release in 2000 through Roadrunner Records. On being signed, guitarist Justin Beck said: "Ross showed up at a practice, we start a song; 5-4-3-2-1. Ross stands up, waving his hands and he's like, 'It's over, it's done. I want to do this, you've got a deal!'" The line-up on this record was Palumbo, Beck, Todd Weinstock, Manuel Carrero and Sammy Siegler (who left the band prior to the subsequent tour). Robinson has said of it: "Our goal at the time of that record was to destroy Adidas rock", a self-deprecating reference to the Adidas-sponsored bands (Korn, Limp Bizkit) Robinson had produced and championed as part of the nu-metal movement.

Although Everything You Ever Wanted to Know About Silence is often cited as a milestone post-hardcore album, it saw little push from Roadrunner, making the band disillusioned with the label. Matters were somewhat worsened when Palumbo started to have bouts with his Crohn's disease on tour, as his aggressive performance style sometimes triggers a relapse, which has the potential to be fatal. It is alleged that Roadrunner would not allow Palumbo to leave the tour to rest.

Larry Gorman of Orange 9mm officially took over drumming duties partway through touring, which saw dates with Deftones and a six-week European tour with Soulfly. The line-up continued to rotate following the conclusion of the tour when Manuel Carrero was kicked out by Roadrunner for being the only member to have date conflicts with touring.

The album was reissued on vinyl in 2009, limited to 10,000 copies.

=== Worship and Tribute (2001–2003) ===
In 2001, the band entered the studio in secret with Ross Robinson and began recording their follow-up album Worship and Tribute, which would see release the following year. The album was engineered and mixed by Mike Fraser. They left Roadrunner in December 2001 and shopped the album to other labels before signing a deal with Warner Bros. Records. The line-up on this record was Palumbo, Beck (who also played bass), Weinstock, and Shannon Larkin of Amen and later Godsmack, who provided drumming duties due to recording time constraints, as he had worked well with producer Ross Robinson in the past, although Larry Gorman was composing parts and officially the drummer of the band. The album showcased a more melodic sound with jazz and ambient influences. Palumbo called it "a mélange of influences, a collage is what this band is all about."

Dave Allen joined the group as bassist following the recording of the album. The band then toured extensively throughout 2002 and 2003, playing all over the world, including festival tours such as Warped Tour, Ozzfest and Snocore. In October 2002, dates in Germany and the UK were cancelled when Palumbo was hospitalized in Paris after suffering a relapse of his Crohn's disease; he subsequently underwent intestinal surgery. The dates were rescheduled to December, but Palumbo suffered another relapse. In April of 2003, he was hospitalized again in Glasgow, Scotland which led to further cancellations, including the Kerrang! Weekender and a date at the London Astoria.

=== Hiatus and rebirth (2004–2008) ===
The band took a hiatus in 2004, while Palumbo was composing and performing with his new group Head Automatica—which included drummer Larry Gorman—and Beck worked on his band merchandise business. In late 2004, Todd Weinstock, Dave Allen, and Larry Gorman were all fired from the band, fueling rumors that they had split up. The band's website displayed the phrase "RIP Glassjaw" in the header for a time, though this may have been in jest. The band denied that they were splitting up and cited Palumbo's ongoing problems with Crohn's disease as one of the reasons for the hiatus.

After a two-year hiatus, the band played three shows in 2005; two at The Downtown in Farmingdale, New York, with proceeds going to charity, and a spot on The Used's tour at the Hammerstein Ballroom. They were initially meant to be main tour support for The Used, but Palumbo had further problems with his Crohn's, prompting Head Automatica to cancel all of their US shows. Manuel Carrero, who had been playing with the band The Jiant, replaced Allen as bassist after nearly five years away from the group. Durijah Lang, who was also a former band member from their early years, replaced Larry Gorman behind the kit. The band did not fill its vacant guitarist role and continued as a four-piece.

In October 2005 the band released a B-side EP of songs not used on Worship and Tribute, titled El Mark. Their official website became active once again in November 2006. The band would go on to tour in December of that year as a supporting act for Deftones, and a few headlining shows (which the band dubbed the Fucking Tour 2006). Palumbo said, "The best thing about the tour was just having it happen." On New Year's Eve of 2006, Glassjaw played at the two-day festival Stillborn Fest in Connecticut, alongside Hatebreed and others. Along with new material was the confirmation that a new album would be released in 2007, with the new songs introduced at the shows included.

Glassjaw's official site homepage showed "7.7.7." in large bold text, referring to a one-off show at the Carling Academy Brixton in England. It was then announced on a fan site that they would be playing a warm-up show at the Camden Barfly on June 7th. These shows were the first time in four years the band performed in the United Kingdom. At the end of 2007, Glassjaw headlined various venues in southern California for the first time such as the Avalon in Hollywood, the House of Blues in San Diego, and the Glasshouse in Pomona. This was dubbed the "100% Maybe" tour, a joke referring to the uncertain nature of their tours due to frequent cancellations. The band was one of the headlining acts of 2007's Saints & Sinners Festival at the Asbury Park Convention Hall in Asbury Park, New Jersey, along with Against Me!.

In 2008, Glassjaw returned to the UK, playing at the two-day festival Give It A Name in Sheffield on May 10, and in London on May 11. They also did shows in Cardiff, Wales, and Dublin, Ireland.

=== Our Color Green and Coloring Book (2008–2014) ===
In an interview with Palumbo in the July 2006 issue of Alternative Press, he stated that Glassjaw were in the process of writing and recording new material for the next album, which they hoped to release in 2007, hinting it could be a concept album.

In November 2007, Beck revealed the band had written "about eleven good songs -- seven [that] I love, and four to six half-baked ideas we need to finish." In an interview with Kerrang!, Palumbo stated that the new album would hopefully be released somewhere between late 2008 and early 2009. Details emerged from The Grixer in May 2008 that the album was "awaiting vocals" and "should be wrapped up and completed in the coming months". In June 2008, Beck commented that the album would be released later that year.

The album was not produced by Ross Robinson, as with previous releases; instead, Beck co-produced the album with his friend Jonathan Florencio, the latter of whom also engineered the album. By June 2008, drums, bass, and guitar parts of thirteen songs had been tracked, but vocal tracking was incomplete with some vocals having been recorded for "You Think You're (John Fucking Lennon)", "Jesus Glue", the reworked "Star Above My Bed", and "Natural Born Farmer," all of which had been played live and which were expected to be included on the album; however, tracks "Convectuoso" and "Midwestern Stylings" were not included on Worship and Tribute, despite media reports and announcements at live shows. A fifth, unnamed track had only freestyle vocals recorded, perhaps indicating that lyrics were yet to be written for the rest of the album at this point. It was rumored prior to the official announcement that the album would be self-titled, and Beck hinted, though speculatively, at a possible digital release. He also stated he would have wanted to release the record himself, but it is likely it will be released by Warner Bros., as with Worship and Tribute.

In the fall of 2009, Glassjaw supported Brand New on their headline tour. Around the same time, Glassjaw parted ways with Warner Bros. Records due to large corporate shakeups in the company, as well as Palumbo's creative differences with the label regarding Head Automatica's still-unreleased third album, Swan Damage. They were able to take the tracks they had already recorded with them.

In December 2009, it was announced that Manuel Carrero and Durijah Lang left Saves the Day in order to focus entirely on Glassjaw. This made it clear that both Carrero and Lang are not just hired touring musicians and are full-time members.

In January 2010, Glassjaw debuted a new song, entitled "All Good Junkies Go To Heaven" live on their UK tour. The song's title was announced by Daryl Palumbo via Twitter some months before. It was the first new song that Glassjaw has played in nearly four years ("Lennon" and "Jesus Glue" were debuted late 2006). In addition, the band also added "El Mark" and "Convectuoso" to their setlists, two fan-favorite B-sides that had been sparingly played live. On the last show of their 2010 tour at Emo's in Austin, TX, the band premiered a new song with the tentative title "Wolfegg".

In August 2010, Glassjaw returned to the UK to headline the Hevy Music Festival held at the Port Lympne Wild Animal Park near Folkestone. Temporary session bassist Sarosh Brohi stepped in for the tour.

To promote an EP consisting of 5 new songs, Glassjaw presented a unique marketing program where fans were offered a free digital release in conjunction with a special limited product or event. Any time a fan bought an item off their online store, included but not mentioned in the package, the fan would get a 2" die-cut plastic logo for free. Other fans received a random postcard in the mail. The postcard had no return label, no explanation and consisted of a perforated logo. On August 8, 2010 (8/8) the band released a 7" vinyl single for "All Good Junkies Go to Heaven" spray-painted green and pink on either side of the vinyl at the UK's Hevy Fest. This is the first official Glassjaw release since 2005's El Mark EP. On August 8, 2010 via MerchDirect, "All Good Junkies Go To Heaven" became available for purchase. Within hours of availability, the vinyl had sold out. Fans soon realized that in order to play the vinyl, they needed the die-cut logo. Shortly thereafter, in addition to the launch of the single, a "one-take" live video of their 2008 song "You Think You're John Fucking Lennon" was posted on the official Glassjaw website. Glassjaw then announced the release of another vinyl single for release on September 9, 2010 (9/9) for the song "Jesus Glue," as well as a digital download for "All Good Junkies Go To Heaven" in various formats.

On September 23, the band posted a video for the song, "Stars," a reworked version of "Star Above my Bed," a fan favorite. As they did with "Junkies" and "Jesus Glue," continuing the date patterns of 8/8, 9/9, on October 10, 2010 (10/10) the band released another vinyl, containing the track "Natural Born Farmer" and the digital release of "Jesus Glue."

On December 12, 2010 (12/12), Glassjaw released "You Think You're (John Fucking Lennon)" on vinyl which instantly sold out. On December 19, an Amazon.com page listing was opened for a Glassjaw EP titled, Our Color Green (The Singles) (an allusion to the band's first release) with a 1/1/11 release date, all but confirming the rumors of the vinyl tracks being on the aforementioned EP. On December 20, 2010, MerchDirect began selling ticket/poster bundles for Glassjaw shows across the U.S.

On New Years Day 2011, the Our Color Green (The Singles) EP was released digitally to online music retailers including iTunes, Amazon, and eMusic among others. The band also encored their 1/1/11 show at the Best Buy Theater in New York with five new songs that Daryl confirmed would be on the bands forthcoming album to be released early in the year.

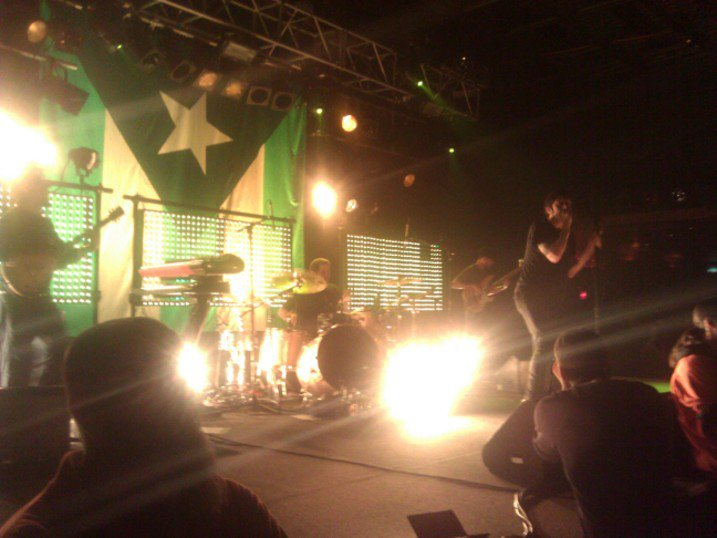
Glassjaw performing in March 2011 in Sayreville, New Jersey

At 11:11 am on January 11, glassjaw.com began streaming a studio recording of "Gold." The website's background was changed to a live band photo with the text "coloring book, the extended play. available exclusively at venue. gratis." After the first concert on their 2011 tour, February 13, 2011, the new EP Coloring Book was given away free to each fan that attended the concert. Glassjaw played two shows in the UK, at the London HMV Forum (March 30) and the Cardiff Solus (March 31), with support from Napalm Death and also headlined Soundfest (June 10), playing alongside other artists such as Brother Ali, Del the Funky Homosapien and If He Dies He Dies. The band also played the Radio 1 / NME Stage at Reading and Leeds Festival in August 2011.

Glassjaw played their first show of 2012 in support of Rise Against's Endgame Tour. It was the only show in which Glassjaw opened for them on the tour. A Day To Remember, The Menzingers, Architects, Touché Amoré, and Title Fight also supported on selected dates. Glassjaw were also added to the Sonisphere festival line-up around this time were to perform Worship & Tribute in its entirety during their set. However, it was announced on March 29, 2012 via Sonisphere's website that the festival was canceled due to issues in setting up the festival. As a result, the band scheduled a date at New York's Irving Plaza to play the album in its entirety. The band also played Hevy Fest in 2012, alongside acts such as Converge, Rolo Tomassi and Will Haven. It marked Glassjaw's second time playing at the festival, and the first since headlining it in 2010. On December 1, 2012 the band played the Unsilent Night Festival in Texas, where they performed a cover of the 108 song "Woman".

In 2013, the band embarked on a summer headlining tour in the United States. In the fall, the band played Riot Fest in Chicago, as well as an opening for Deftones at a Los Angeles show at the Greek Theater, and also played a headlining show in Santa Ana, California.

At the beginning of 2014, the band participated in the Soundwave Festival in Australia, as well as playing a few Australian club shows with The Dillinger Escape Plan. In the summer of 2014, Glassjaw once again briefly returned to performing, playing a brief set at the Amnesia Rockfest (in Montebello, QC). Later in the fall, the band played Riot Fest in both Denver and Toronto, Made In America Festival in Philadelphia, and Fun Fun Fun Fest in Austin, Texas, which would be the band's last performance with Carrero on bass and Lang on drums.

On the weekend of November 28, 2014, the band's merchandise website had a Black Friday sale where fans would get 19.93% off their order if they applied the promo code "weactuallyjuststartedwriting", hinting that a new album was in the works.

=== Line-up change and Material Control (2015–present) ===
In July 2015 it was confirmed by drummer Durijah Lang that he and bass player Manuel Carrero quit the band in January. When asked for an explanation, Lang reportedly said, "I just felt like I needed to. No axe to grind with those guys. I just ran out of good reasons not to call it a day." The two went on to join Burn.

Both Lang and Carrero were replaced by two former Glass Cloud members, bassist Travis Sykes and drummer Chad Hasty.

Glassjaw's first performance with the newly installed rhythm section was a surprise performance at Amityville Music Hall in Amityville, NY on August 7, 2015. Along with that performance, the band played a handful of performances including Wrecking Ball Festival, Heavy Montreal, Taste Of Chaos Festival, and Aftershock Festival, as well as a show opening for Coheed And Cambria in Asbury Park, New Jersey, and a headline show in San Francisco with Dance Gavin Dance.

On December 1, 2015, Glassjaw released a new song titled "New White Extremity" on the band's SoundCloud account. Music news website Pitchfork stated that the band would be releasing a new album, but did not give detail on when the album would be released. On January 31, 2016 Glassjaw debuted new material at The Old Blue Last in London. At this warm-up show, they performed "New White Extremity" as well as six other new songs, which they did not name at the time. The following night, February 1, 2016, Glassjaw played at the O2 Ritz in Manchester Theater, again playing more new material including another song called "Shira".

In February and March 2016, Glassjaw opened for Coheed and Cambria on their The Color Before the Sun tour in the United Kingdom and in the United States. During this tour, the band played "New White Extremity" and "Shira". Also during this tour, they played 7 small headlining shows in nearby cities. At these headlining shows, the band's set list contained mostly new songs that have yet to be released. Some of these news songs are speculated to be titled "Neo", "Metal", "Post Apocalyptic", and "Abigados". The band did not make any other announcements about their oft-rumored third album for nearly two years. However, on May 18, 2016 it was announced that the band would be playing both Denver and Chicago dates of Riot Fest.

In December 2016, The Dillinger Escape Plan drummer Billy Rymer confirmed that he'd tracked drums for "a whole album's worth of material" towards the band's third album.

On November 15, 2017, Amazon leaked a few details of a new Glassjaw album tentatively titled Material Control. It was listed with a December 1, 2017 release date containing 12 tracks. A flexi-disc format of the album containing 10 songs was sent to fans who previously had ordered Glassjaw merchandise through Justin Beck's MerchDirect company prior to an official announcement.

On November 24, 2017, Glassjaw released a new song titled "Shira" and confirmed a December 1, 2017 release date for Material Control. The album was released via Century Media Records to critical acclaim. The music video for "Shira" followed in April 2018.

In April 2018, the band announced a co-headlining summer tour with Quicksand. On June 28, 2018, the band released a music video for "Golgotha".

The band will make an appearance on the 2026 Vans Warped Tour.

== Musical style ==
The band's sound is rooted in the New York hardcore scene. Elements of the late 1980s youth crew style of hardcore are prominent in their earlier recordings, and Youth of Today have been cited as an important influence. Glassjaw have cited numerous bands as influences, including Bad Brains, Sick of It All, Orange 9mm, Faith No More, Anthrax, the Cure, Squeeze, and Fugazi. Beck has cited Faith No More's attitude towards making music as an influence, while Palumbo has specifically cited Mike Patton as a huge influence on him. Glassjaw has been described as post-hardcore, alternative metal and nu metal early in their career.

Apart from this, Palumbo's lyrics frequently quote other artists as a tribute, quoting acts such as Frank Zappa, Tori Amos, and Gravediggaz, among others.

RockSound named the band "The Biggest DIY Band In The World" because of the band's independence from major labels, insistence on maintaining creative control of both their sound and presentation and grassroots approach to distributing their music despite several hiatuses. On why the band still exists, Palumbo stated, "Glassjaw provides a real outlet for all our creativity. And allows us to sit around making dick and fart jokes all day." Beck stated, "Glassjaw would suck if this was how we paid our rent because then you'd make stupid decisions in order to pay the bills. Once money and popularity have a bearing on your art then it's gone, diluted. You lose it."

In a nod to how the band shuns the music industry standard of putting out an album, when asked why the long wait for new music, Palumbo stated "...we write a lot. When the band is at the forefront, that’s when the spark really seems to happen. If it was up to me and him, we’d get together every weekend and make an album almost every few months. But I think the most poignant and potent Glassjaw [comes from] us stockpiling the goodness until it’s time to do it. And when it’s time to do it, the universe very much lets us know.”

== Problems with Roadrunner Records ==
Both Palumbo and Beck have been openly vocal about their negative experiences with Roadrunner, and have continued to talk about them years after their departure from the label in December 2001. They openly advise people not to buy their first full-length so as not to give the label money, and have repeatedly told fans at shows to illegally download the record. Palumbo has said of them:

"Roadrunner is a joke. Roadrunner's not even a real label. It has the power to be one of the superpowers in the heavy music industry. While labels like Victory Records, which is such a small hardcore label, is totally surpassing Roadrunner. Roadrunner is a joke. It's like the scourge of the music industry."

Beck has said:

"Seriously, don't ever support anything from Roadrunner – they suck!"

Palumbo has said that Roadrunner didn't put the band on enough tours:

"We never toured half as much as we wanted to, I just wish we got to tour more in support of [Everything You Ever Wanted to Know About Silence]"
"We were on Roadrunner for a couple of years and Roadrunner was a joke, a fuckin' joke of a label. They are a miserable fuckin' corporation that does not bend for their bands, does not give their bands anything and they're just terrible businessmen. They are a giant joke of a label. They had 2 cash cows, Slipknot and Nickelback, and every other project they had rode backseat to those bands, and then the second that the new Slipknot record came out and didn't go quadruple Platinum in the first few hours it was released they fuckin' turned their backs on Slipknot. That label just wants instant gratification where it sells its units and that's a joke. You can't run a major corporation with that as your business strategy."

Regarding the re-release of the remastered version of Everything You Ever Wanted to Know About Silence in March 2009 by Roadrunner, Beck was quoted by Alter The Press! in saying:

"It's complete shit! We had nothing to do with it. DO NOT BUY IT! It's embarrassing."

== Musical influence and legacy ==
Glassjaw have been regarded as one of the most influential bands of the post-hardcore genre. Born of the Long Island hardcore scene, producer Ross Robinson declared in 2000 that Glassjaw "was on a mission to destroy the ‘Adidas Rock’ of nu-metal bands like Limp Bizkit." Their usage of dissonant melodies through their two guitarists, Justin Beck and Todd Weinstock, created a jazz-like sound that was unique and original for the genre. Nick Greer of Sputnikmusic stated that "part of what makes Glassjaw such a stand out band is a combination of structured genre blending and blissfully naive experimentation." Michael Ventimiglia of the Long Island Press said that their Worship and Tribute album "helped shape and define music for a new generation."

Modern post-hardcore bands such as Funeral for a Friend, Night Verses, The Movielife, The Color Morale and Letlive have named Glassjaw as a formidable influence. Funeral For a Friend lead singer Matt Davies-Kreye stated that "Glassjaw are such an experimental band and integrate a lot of different styles and influences in their music such as ambient rock, hardcore, post-rock and jazz. They always taught me to go against the grain, pay more attention to dynamics and think outside of the box when writing songs. I like to think that our new material is heavily GlassJaw-influenced." Mike Cunniff of Boston Manor said that "they definitely have a strong cult following not dissimilar to Brand New. Their music has stood the test of time because they have always been so fresh and original.”

== Band members ==
Current members

- Daryl Palumbo – lead vocals (1993–present), guitar (1995–1999)
- Justin Beck – guitar (1993–1998), keyboards (1993–present), bass (1998; in studio 2001–present), guitar (1998–present)
- Chad Hasty – drums (2015–present)

Current touring musicians

- Cody Hosza – bass (2022–present)

Former touring musicians

- Scottie Redix – drums (1999)
- Mat Brown – bass (2001)
- Mitchell Marlow – bass (2001)
- Travis Sykes – bass (2015–2018)
- Dan Ellis – bass (2018)
- Matt Rubano – bass (2019)
- Isaac Bolivar – bass (2019)

Former members

- Dave Buchta – bass (1993–1995)
- Nick Yulico – guitar (1993–1995)
- Ariel Telford – bass (1995–1998)
- Kris Baldwin – guitar (1995–1998)
- Todd Weinstock – guitar, backing vocals (1996–2004)
- Brian Meehan – guitar (1996–1997)
- Mike Caleo – guitar (1996–1997)
- Stefan Linde – drums (1998)
- Durijah Lang - drums (1998–1999, 2004–2015)
- Manuel Carrero – bass (1998–2000, 2004–2015)
- Sammy Siegler – drums (1999–2000)
- Larry Gorman – drums (2000–2004)
- Dave "Harbron" Allen – bass (2001–2004)

Former session musicians

- Shannon Larkin – drums (2001–2002)
- Billy Rymer – drums (2015–2016)

== Discography ==
=== Studio albums ===
Album title	Release details	US	US Ind.	US Rock	UK	Sales
Everything You Ever Wanted to Know About Silence	Released: May 9, 2000; Label: Roadrunner; Format: CD, 2xLP	—	—	—	82	US: 47,000+
Worship and Tribute	Released: July 9, 2002; Label: Warner Bros.; Formal CD, LP	82	—	—	—	US: 54,000+
Material Control	Released: December 1, 2017; Label: Century Media; Format: CD, LP	—	7	12	—	
"—" denotes a recording that did not chart or was not released in that territory.

=== EPs ===
- Kiss Kiss Bang Bang (1997)
- El Mark (2005)
- Our Color Green (The Singles) (2011)
- Coloring Book (2011)

=== Demos ===
- Something Lasts Forever (1994)
- Our Color Green in 6/8 Time (1996)
- The Impossible Shot (1996)
- Split with Motive (1996)
- Monster Zero (1998)
- The Don Fury Sessions (1999)

=== Singles ===
Title	Year	Peak chart positions		Album
Title	Year	UK	UK Rock	Album
"Pretty Lush"	2000	—	—	Everything You Ever Wanted to Know About Silence
"Ry Ry's Song"	2000	—	—	Everything You Ever Wanted to Know About Silence
"Cosmopolitan Bloodloss"	2002	76	—	Worship and Tribute
"Ape Dos Mil"	2003	87	7	Worship and Tribute
"All Good Junkies Go to Heaven"	2010	—	—	Our Color Green (The Singles)
"Jesus Glue"	2010	—	—	Our Color Green (The Singles)
"Natural Born Farmer"	2010	—	—	Our Color Green (The Singles)
"Stars"	2010	—	—	Our Color Green (The Singles)
"You Think You're (John Fucking Lennon)"	2010	—	—	Our Color Green (The Singles)
"New White Extremity"	2015	—	—	Material Control
"Shira"	2017	—	—	Material Control
"Golgotha"	2018	—	—	Material Control

=== Compilation contributions ===
Year	Song(s)	Album
1996	"Faust" and "Pravado"	516: A Long Island Hardcore Compilation
2000	"Midwestern Stylings" (remix)	The Best Comp In the World

== Music videos ==
Year	Song	Director
2000	"Siberian Kiss"	Steve Pedulla
2000	"Pretty Lush"	Steve Pedulla
2002	"Cosmopolitan Bloodloss"	Patrick Hoelck
2003	"Ape Dos Mil"	Cooper Johnson, Jason Moyer
2003	"Tip Your Bartender"	
2010	"You Think You're (John Fucking Lennon)"	
2018	"Shira"	
2018	"Golgotha"	
2018	"My Conscience Weighs a Ton"	
2021	"Gold"	

== See also ==
- Head Automatica
- United Nations
- Men, Women & Children
- Classic Case
- Saves the Day
- Sons of Abraham
- Roadrunner United
- Color Film
