= Men, Women & Children (band) =

American electropop band

- Also known as: Easy Tiger, Torpedo
- Genres: Electropop, dance-rock
- Years active: 2004–2008
- Label: Reprise
- Members: TJ Penzone; Rick Penzone
- Past members: Todd Weinstock; Nick Conceller; David Sullivan-Kaplan; Christopher Wrigley; Jason Giammule

Men, Women & Children (formerly known as Easy Tiger, Torpedo) was an electropop band formed in 2004 by ex-Glassjaw guitarist Todd Weinstock and TJ Penzone. They released their self-titled debut album in 2006. Penzone initially wanted the band to be named Easy Tiger, but had to rename the band after a band in Chicago by the same name refused to sell him the rights.

They have supported acts such as Metric, Gang of Four, Rx Bandits, De La Soul, Brand New, The Format, Snoop Dogg, Head Automatica and ¡Forward, Russia!. They also headlined their own shows with supporting acts like We Are The Fury.

On June 13, 2007, according to a blog posted on their Myspace page, the band separated itself from Warner/Reprise Records citing a lack of distribution of their first album as the major reason they wanted to leave.

On November 19, 2008, according to a blog posted by Todd and Nick on Myspace, three had left the band, including Todd, Nick, and David "Skully" Sullivan-Kaplan. The primary reason for the departures was a lack of communication caused by the distance between band members. Their last show with the band was on December 29, 2008, in New York City.

TJ Penzone has moved on to form "these People", and Rick Penzone is currently part of Color Film along with Glassjaw frontman Daryl Palumbo. Todd and Nick are now part of Cubic Zirconia. Skully has since married and lives in the UK and currently plays for Razorlight.

== Discography ==
- Men, Women & Children (2006)
- Winter 2006 Mix - A five track mix tape CD given out to the first 100 guests at select US tour stops in December 2006.
- Ultra Hot Volcano - A limited edition vinyl 7-inch single released through IAMSOUND Records (2008)

=== Singles ===
- "Dance In My Blood" (2006)

== Members ==
- TJ Penzone – vocals (2006–2008)
- Rick Penzone – bass (2006–2008)
- Todd Weinstock – guitar (2006–2008)
- Nick Conceller – keyboards (2006–2008)
- David "Skully" Sullivan-Kaplan – drums (2006–2008)
- Christopher Wrigley – (touring member) guitar, vocals (2007-2008)
