= Justin Beck =

American musician and businessman

- Born: Justin Beck; December 11, 1979 (age 46)
- Origin: Merrick, Long Island, New York, U.S.
- Genres: Hardcore punk, metalcore, post-hardcore, alternative metal
- Occupations: Musician, Songwriter, Guitarist
- Instruments: Guitar; bass; drums; keyboards
- Years active: 1993–present
- Label: Warner Music
- Website: www.Glassjaw.com

Justin Beck is an American musician and businessman. He is the guitarist and musical writer for Long Island, New York band Glassjaw. In 1999, Beck founded the merchandise company Merchdirect on the principle of artists owning the rights to merchandise. Beck successfully concluded the sale of Merchdirect and exited the company in 2023. In the 90s, he was a member of the Jewish straight edge hardcore band Sons of Abraham.

== Signature instruments ==
In January 2024, Schecter Guitar Research announced the release of a signature Justin Beck guitar and bass.

=== Production ===
Beck produced the Fever 333 song Ready Rock

== Personal life ==
He and wife, Melissa Howard, an alumna of The Real World: New Orleans, are the parents of Shalom Mazie, who was born March 20, 2009, and two other daughters: Maja and Shira.

Justin Beck is the only member of Glassjaw to remain straight edge.
