= Doug Hughes (activist) =

American former postal worker and political activist (born 1953)

- Hughes in 2020
- Born: September 7, 1953 (age 73)
- Occupations: Mail carrier; Political activist
- Known for: Gyrocopter landing on US Capitol lawn
- Spouse: Alena Hughes

Douglas Hughes is an American former postal worker and political activist, known for landing a one-man ultralight gyrocopter on the lawn of the United States Capitol on April 15, 2015. Hughes was carrying 535 letters, one to each member of Congress, protesting what he referred to as bipartisan corruption and dysfunctional government. He surrendered peacefully after landing to the Capitol Police.

Hughes was later charged with six crimes. Hughes pleaded guilty in November 2015 to one felony and was sentenced to 120 days plus one year of probation.

== Early life ==
Hughes was born in San Mateo County, California, and grew up in Santa Cruz. He graduated from Holy Cross High School in Santa Cruz and enlisted in the U.S. Navy, serving aboard the USS Enterprise as an electrician's mate third class. A U.S. Postal Service official said that Hughes had become a rural letter carrier in 2003.

== Gyrocopter flight ==
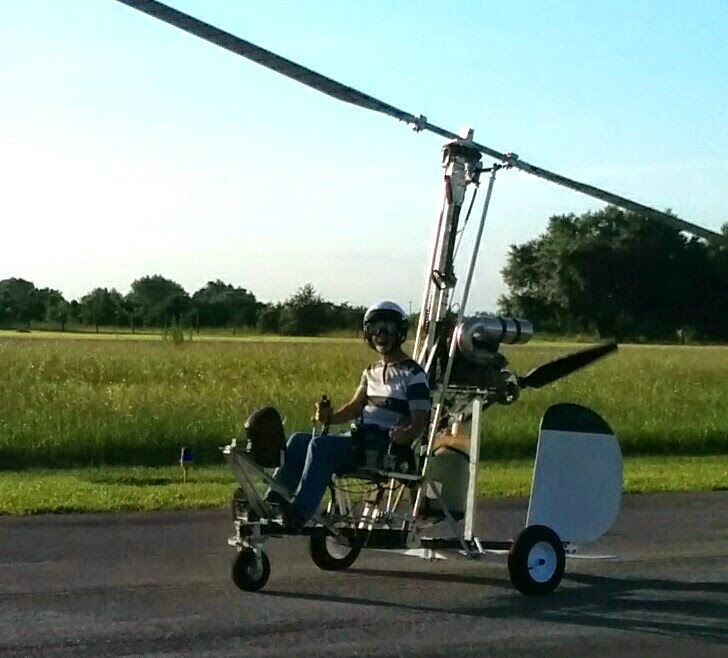
Doug Hughes July 2014

Hughes was deeply affected by the suicide of his son, John, in August 2012. Hughes told the Tampa Bay Times that his protest had been a response to this, suggesting that his son had, "paid far too high a price for an unimportant issue, but if you're willing to take a risk, the ultimate risk, to draw attention to something that does have significance, it's worth doing."

According to Hughes, his intent was to deliver a political message by "delivering the mail." Hughes carried 535 letters to Congress, individually stamped and addressed to each member of Congress. The flight was broadcast over the Internet to Hughes' web site "The Democracy Club". The flight from a small airport in Gettysburg, PA across Maryland finished on the west lawn of the US Capitol Building - a distance of about 70 miles and total flight time just under 90 minutes.

In 2014, Hughes contacted a writer with the Tampa Bay Times to explain his non-violent protest. Interviews and video, including flight video, were arranged in advance with the understanding the story would be posted online at the Times web site as soon as the flight began. The reporter was in Washington DC and saw the take-off on Hughes' web site. At the time Hughes began the flight, an E-mail to the government through barackobama.com was sent automatically which explained the intent of the flight and where it was going. Dozens of emails were sent to the media directing them to the Tampa Bay Times web site for the story and the Hughes web site for the background. A few weeks after the flight, the Chairman of the US House Oversight Committee in an official hearing on the gyrocopter flight said, "The guy in the gyrocopter was livefeeding a stream. I have heard a story from one of the major networks where they were watching it in New York, called down to the Capitol, and had staff reporters and producers go down on the grass to watch it happen."

Seventeen months before the flight, Hughes was interviewed by the US Secret Service. In October 2013, he admitted to the US Secret Service owning a gyrocopter and identified where it was located but did not admit to specific plans for the flight. Hughes claimed this encounter with the federal police validated his non-violent inclination. In the letter to the government sent at the time of take-off and to the media, Hughes declared the investigation by the US Secret Service and lack of action by the authorities was proof that his non-violent political intent had been established in advance of the flight.

Following his return to Florida, Hughes did a number of interviews from his home while under house arrest. These included interviews on "Good Morning America", "Hannity," and Democracy Now," among others. In the interviews Hughes argued for the need to reverse the Supreme Court decision, Citizens United v. FEC and reduce the influence of wealth on American politics. Hughes would later reflect that his biggest regret of the flight was not wearing a heavier sweater because of the cold weather.

Hughes flight triggered media discussion on the subject of money in politics. In an editorial for Huffingtonpost, John Ennis presented asked, "what other recourse did he have?" while Jon Stewart declared "Kudos to that guy!" after dubbing the incident "Wack Hawk Down". The co-founder of Ben & Jerry's Ice Cream, Ben Cohen, wrote an editorial supporting Hughes' flight as a legitimate act of civil disobedience. Other political personalities, including Ralph Nader and former representatives Connie Morella (R-MD) and Dan Glickman (D-KS) teamed up to write an editorial "We Are Gyrocopter," which decried "special interest" and "corrosive big money's" influence on American politics.

Hughes also faced strong criticism for the flight. Representative Jason Chaffetz (R-UT) said that Hughes was "lucky to be alive" and "should have been blown out of the air," while broadcaster Anderson Cooper expressed concern over the tax dollars that would be spent in law enforcement and prosecution for Hughes' 'stunt'. The US Postal Service was unhappy with Hughes' flight. His gyrocopter had carried the US Postal logo, and the Post Office determined that the use of two small corrugated trays to transport mail was misappropriation of government property. Hughes was suspended after the flight and fired in July 2015. He appealed the decision and retired in 2016.

=== Impact ===
The gyrocopter flight inspired art in a variety of venues. Soon after the flight, street art depicting the flight showed up in Los Angeles. Two different songs were written, "Ballad of Doug Hughes" by Paul Loether and "Superhero Autogyro" by Curtis Long. An award-winning video, "An American Mailman's Flight for Freedom" was produced by Joseph Huff-Hannon. In his last few weeks before retirement, David Letterman hosted President Obama and delivered the "Top 10 Questions Dumb Guys Ask the President". Number One, was the gyrocopter pilot purportedly asking the Chief Executive: "When will you return my gyrocopter?" Unknown pranksters announced the "Doug Hughes Commemorative Postal Stamp" to the press through a parody web site with a convincing photo of postal executives outside the US Postal Museum making the announcement.

Exactly a year after the Hughes flight, a march from Philadelphia to the US Capitol kicked off a week of peaceful civil disobedience. In the protest dubbed "Democracy Spring" over 1300 arrests were made at the Capitol Building in a protest of "Citizens United". Hughes had little direct influence in "Democracy Spring", organized by 99Rise, which Hughes could not attend by court order but his influence was present. Among the groups supporting "Democracy Spring" was "Code Pink", the women's peace group. Media Benjamin, co-founder of "Code Pink" said of the assembly of thousands: "I think it's fair to say that this is his [Doug Hughes] baby."

Exactly two years after the flight Doug Hughes mailed the letters to Congress, conventionally at the Post Office he previously worked at. The letters had been impounded as evidence - Hughes recovered them after he finished his prison term. Within the limits of his probation, which limits his travel, he is active with other leaders in the movement to get big money out of politics.

Federal authorities announced in October 2016 they would destroy the gyrocopter which Hughes was required to forfeit in the plea agreement.

== Later life ==
Hughes finished his prison term in October 2016, then remained under federal probation until October 2017. When probation finished he intended to return to national activism on the corrosive effect of big money in politics and the reform measures he believes are possible and effective. Retired from the US Postal Service, he currently gives speeches and has published a book "Flight Plan: A Mailman's Aerial Adventure and Special Delivery" in September 2021. He spoke at the 2018 Unrig the System summit where he was presented with an award for his actions.
