= Save Ben & Jerry's =

Save Ben & Jerry's was a grassroots stakeholder protest to keep Ben & Jerry's from being acquired by the multinational conglomerate, Unilever.

== Background ==
From its founding in 1978 by Ben Cohen and Jerry Greenfield through 1999, Ben & Jerry's Homemade Inc. was a model of Corporate Social Responsibility, an activist for social causes, and a significant supporter of environmental, community, and peace programs, giving 7.5 percent of their pre-tax profits to charity.

When Ben & Jerry's Homemade Inc. announced on December 2, 1999 that it had received and was considering acquisition indications of interest from a conglomerate multinational corporation, a 23-year-old Internet activist, Garret John LoPorto immediately launched a grass-roots protest campaign to “Save Ben & Jerry's” from being acquired by multinational corporate interests.

The protests were subsequently joined by thousands, including Vermont Governor Howard Dean, Congressional Representative Bernie Sanders, mayor of Burlington Vermont, Peter Clavelle, and Black Dog Cafe founder Judy Wicks, receiving substantial international press coverage.

== Protests ==
Upon hearing of the potential Ben & Jerry's takeover, Garret John LoPorto helped launch the issue into public awareness by putting Ben & Jerry's up for sale on eBay, with a record reserve price of $250 million; getting himself banned from eBay for life - but not before LoPorto got people's attention for the cause. The eBay listing went viral while pointing out, “Huge multinational corporations are trying to buy Ben & Jerry's so they can use its good name to push their soulless products.”

Don't sell out! began sounding from the Internet to demonstrations in front of Ben & Jerry's scoop shops worldwide, from the Vermont Statehouse to the streets of Burlington, Vermont where the company began in 1978.

The mayor of Burlington Vermont, Peter Clavelle, joined these protests, along with Congressional Representative Bernie Sanders and Vermont Governor Howard Dean.

Along with others, Garret viewed this protest as "a last stand by hippie idealism against capitalism."

This fight, Governor Howard Dean said, is about globalization, and the need to keep companies in the hands of Vermonters, Mayor Peter Clavelle adding, Folks on Church Street in Burlington should have as much or more control over our economy as those on Wall Street.

== Wall Street Protest ==
While grassroots demonstrations were growing, Garret John LoPorto, directed protesters to engage what he said was the source of the problem - Wall Street. He began a shareholder petition on the web site, www.savebenjerry.com, urging people to buy shares in Ben & Jerry's so they could use their shareholder status to vote against the Unilever acquisition.

LoPorto warned on the site that gigantic multinational companies are trying to take advantage of Ben & Jerry's undervalued stock price, and want to fool unsuspecting consumers into purchasing their soulless, profit-driven products.

LoPorto said in a phone interview with the New York Times, is a way for the board of directors to see that other people care. Ben and Jerry have been doing this for over 20 years now. They're tired. When you're a prizefighter, you need people to cheer you on to keep going.

“The hippy generation sold itself out as soon as money got in the way,” said Mr. LoPorto. “Ben and Jerry didn’t. They were my inspiration for starting my own business, the model of how you can stick to your ideals and still do well financially.”

== The Founders’ Reaction ==
Amid the controversy, Ben Cohen and Jerry Greenfield maintained an unusual silence. Even if Ben and Jerry opposed the sale, other major shareholders could insist on the acquisition of Ben & Jerry's, because they could launch significant legal attacks against the founders if they interfered with the sale.

When Ben Cohen was asked about the sale on New Hampshire Public Radio, he said, It's my strong personal belief that the only way that the company can actualize its progressive values is to remain independent, so within the bounds of my fiduciary duties as director, I am working hard to find a way to remain independent and return adequate value to the shareholders.

Unilever offered to pay significantly more than the company's stock value on Nasdaq. Industry analysts speculated that if the company's founders did not sell, they would have been open to legal attacks from major shareholders.

Bernie Sanders was disturbed by this. The directors of a company could actually be sued because they are responsive to their employees, to family farmers in our state and to the local economy, he said. That sounds to me to be quite unacceptable.

In the end, the founders were forced to accept the deal. The sale of Ben & Jerry's Homemade Inc, went through in August 2000. Ben Cohen later recounted with the Financial Times, “It was just about the worst day of my life.”

After the acquisition was pushed through, Jerry Greenfield revealed to the New York Times, “we tried very hard to prevent the sale.” Since the takeover, he said, protecting the brand “is a constant struggle, as they have a very different set of values.”

Ben Cohen, during and interview with BBC's Radio 4 channel in Britain, described the conflict between their socially responsible business values and those of the new multinational corporate Ben & Jerry's owners.

“We very carefully negotiated an acquisition agreement that was supposed to maintain the values of Ben & Jerry’s,” Ben Cohen said. “What we are learning is, if you are owned by a corporation that, despite whatever words they might say, does not share those values, it’s incredibly difficult to maintain those values.”
