= Erika Andiola =

Mexican immigration rights activist

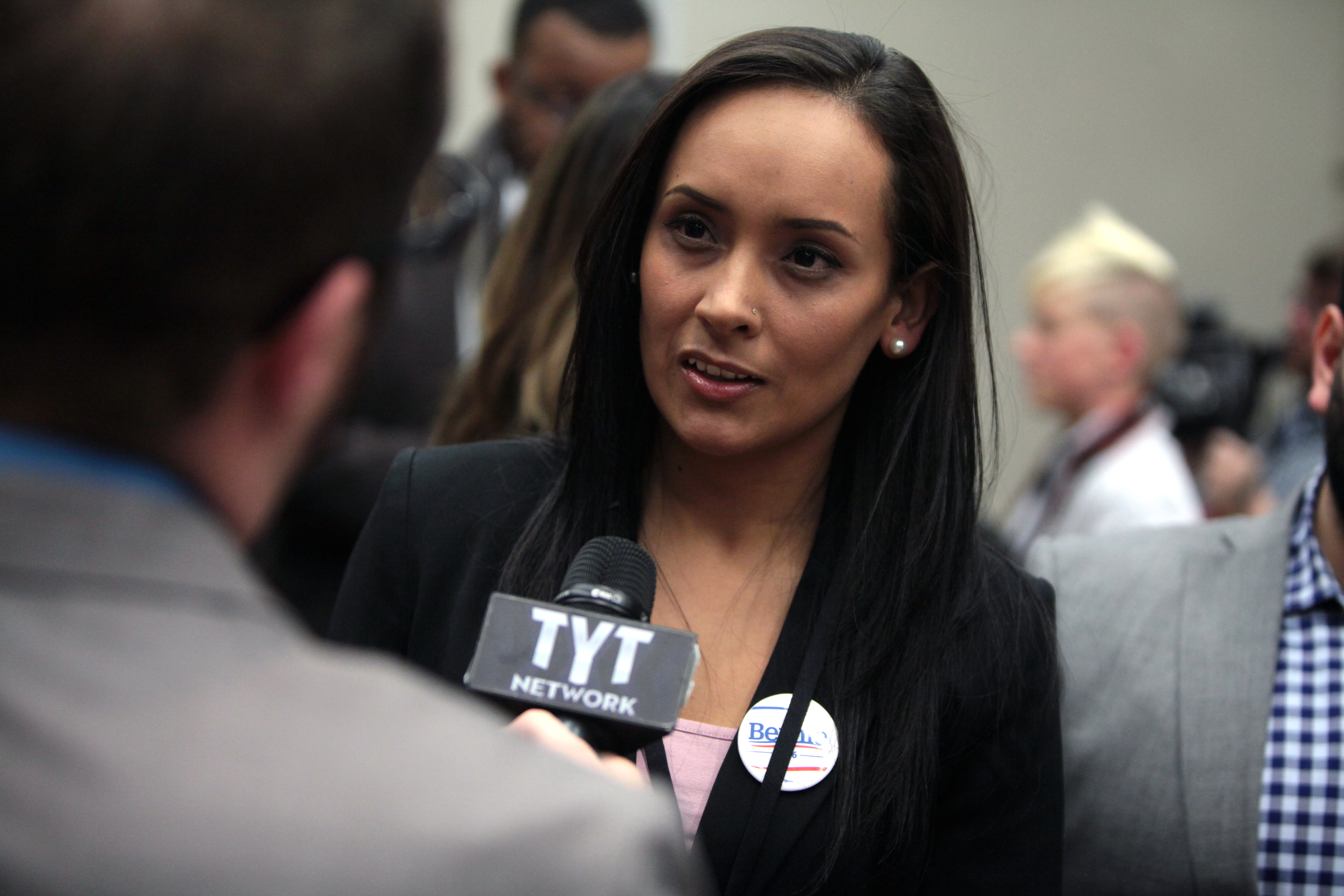
- Andiola in 2016
- Born: 1986–1987 (age 38–39); Mexico
- Occupation: Activist

Erika Andiola is a Mexican immigration rights activist located in Metropolitan Phoenix. She is the Chief Advocacy Officer for the organization RAICES. Her previous political roles include Political Director for the organization Our Revolution, Press Secretary for Latino Outreach in Bernie Sanders’ 2016 campaign, and Congressional staffer for then-Representative Kyrsten Sinema. Much of Andiola's work has been driven by her own journey as an undocumented Mexican female immigrant.

== Biography ==
Andiola's mother brought her, and her brother and sister, into the United States from Durango, Mexico, in 1998, when Andiola was 11 years old. They were fleeing domestic violence. Andiola graduated with a degree in psychology from Arizona State University (ASU) in 2009. During the time the US Senate was deliberating on the Development, Relief, and Education for Minors Act (Dream Act), Andiola came forward publicly as a Dreamer. In 2012 she was granted a deportation reprieve.

Andiola co-founded the Arizona Dream Act Coalition, which is "an immigrant, youth-led organization focusing on the fight for higher education and immigrant rights." In Arizona, she made a name for herself by confronting politicians who supported anti-immigration policies. She has also served in the National Coordinating Committee and the Board of Directors for the United We Dream Network.

In 2013 her mother and brother were detained and nearly deported after a raid at Erika Andiola's Arizona home. She posted a video about her family's detainment on YouTube and it went viral. It was through Andiola's close work with the immigration officers that her family was able to remain in the country. Also in 2013, Andiola played the role of one of the two mothers in the music video, "El Hielo," directed by Alex Rivera. In 2013, she became an outreach staffer for Representative Kyrsten Sinema (D-Phoenix). Later, she was moved to Sinema's Washington, D.C. office. She started working as a triage caseworker with the Guatemalan consulate in 2015. In 2016, she was hired to work for the Bernie Sanders campaign for president as a Latino outreach strategist for the Southwest United States.

In 2018, she was involved in a protest at the Texas State Capitol against rescinding DACA in Texas. Andiola was involved in the group Our Revolution's decision to part ways with Tezlyn Figaro, whose Fox News appearances and tweets criticized the Democratic Party’s focus on “illegal immigrants.”

In 2020, she and RAICES Communication Manager Lucia Allain interrupted Joe Biden's closing statement at the Nevada Democratic primary debate.

== Personal life ==
Andiola is married to Kai Newkirk, an activist and organizer. The two married in 2020.
