= La Santa Cecilia =

Mexican-American band based in Los Angeles

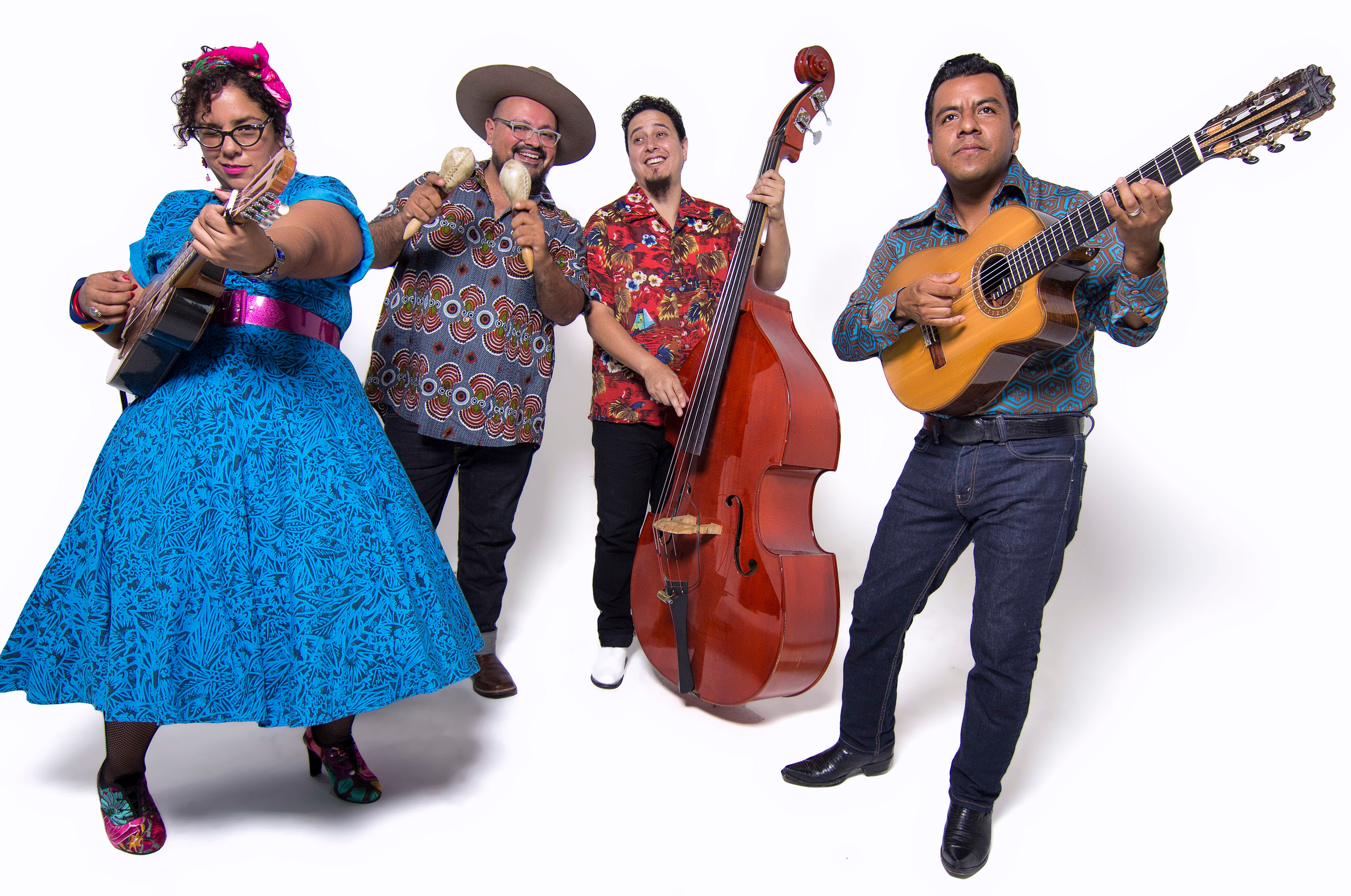

Background information
- Labels: Rebeleon, Inc./ Universal Music Latin Entertainment
- Members: Marisol "La Marisoul" Hernandez: Lead Singer: Jose "Pepe" Carlos: Accordionist and Requinto; Miguel "Oso" Ramirez: Percussionist; Alex Bendaña: Bassist
- Website: lasantacecilia.com

La Santa Cecilia is an American band based in Los Angeles, California that plays a blend of cumbia, bossa nova, and boleros, among other styles. The group is named after Santa Cecilia, who is the patron saint of musicians. The band seeks to represent a US bicultural identity, both immersed in modern music but still close to their Latin American influences and Mexican heritage.

For their full-length studio album, Treinta Días, the group won a Grammy Award for Best Latin Rock, Urban or Alternative Album in 2014. They were nominated in the same category for their album Buenaventura (Universal Music) in 2017 and for Y Vivir (Universal Music) in 2018. With 6 albums under their belt, La Santa Cecilia released their 7th album, self-titled La Santa Cecilia, on October 18, 2019.

La Santa Cecilia have performed at just about every type of venue from rock clubs to festivals in the US and Mexico, including Walt Disney Concert Hall and the Hollywood Bowl in LA.

== Influences ==
La Santa Cecilia's influence ranges from cumbia, Afro-Cuban, bossa nova, folk, mariachi, rock, blues, bolero, rancheras, norteño and jazz. Influential artists include Janis Joplin, Led Zeppelin, Miles Davis, Mercedes Sosa, and Ramon Ayala.

== Members ==
The members of the band include:

- Marisol "La Marisoul" Hernandez: Lead Singer
- Jose "Pepe" Carlos: Accordionist and Requinto
- Miguel "Oso" Ramirez: Percussionist
- Alex Bendaña: Bassist

Additional Members:

- Andres Torres: Drummer
- Marco Sandoval: Guitarist

== Discography ==
=== Studio albums ===
- Noche y Citas (2010)
- El Valor (2012)
- Treinta Días (2013)
- Someday New (2014)
- Buenaventura (2016)
- Amar y Vivir (2017)
- La Santa Cecilia (2019)
- Quiero Verte Feliz (2021)

== Videos and documentaries ==
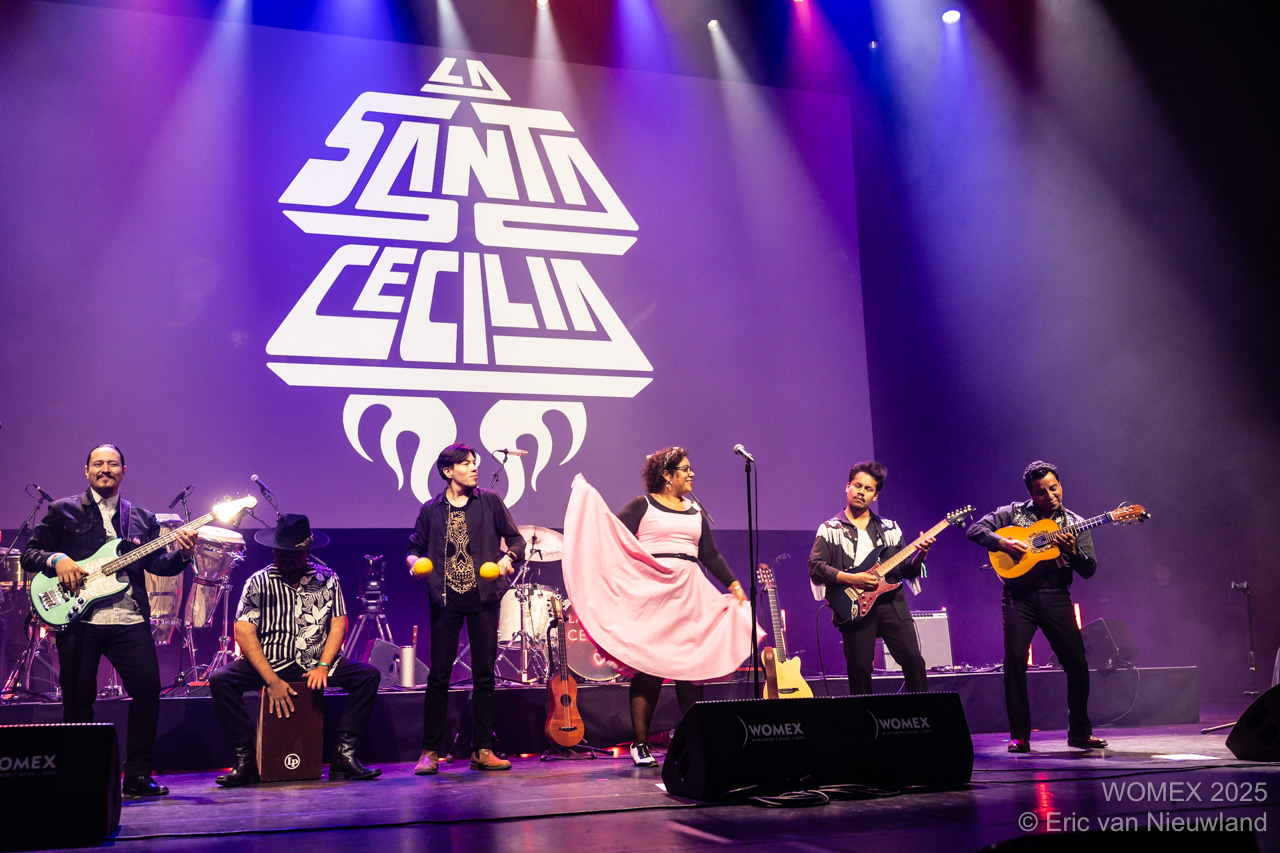
La Santa Cecilia at Womex 25 by Eric van Nieuwland

The group's first video was for "La Negra". The band released a video for "Ice El Hielo," in collaboration with filmmaker Alex Rivera and the National Day Laborer Organizing Network. It "portrays the problem of illegal immigration from the perspective of undocumented immigrants."

La Santa Cecilia, in collaboration with the Nature Conservancy, urge their fans to conserve water and other natural resources in a video that is part of the Conservancy's All Hands On Earth campaign.

== Television and film ==
Television and film producers have used their music, such as on Weeds and The Bridge (1-8). They recorded the song "Tu Vida Es Un Escenario" for the award-winning film Cantinflas and collaborated with two-time Grammy winner Gustavo Santaolalla on "The Apology Song" for the animated hit film The Book of Life, directed by the well-known and famous Mexican animator Jorge Gutierrez. They also have a covered the classic song "Un Mundo Raro" by José Alfredo Jiménez for the Disney Pixar Oscar Award winning film Coco (2017 animated film) soundtrack.
