= Franklin C. Spinney =

American military analyst and critic

- Born: May 2, 1946 (age 80); Wright-Patterson Air Force Base, Ohio, U.S.
- Military career
- Allegiance: United States
- Branch: United States Air Force

Franklin C. "Chuck" Spinney (born May 2, 1945) is an American former military analyst for the Pentagon who became famous in the early 1980s for what became known as the "Spinney Report", criticizing what he described as the reckless pursuit of costly complex weapon systems by the Pentagon, with disregard to budgetary consequences. Despite attempts by his superiors to bury the controversial report, it eventually was exposed during a United States Senate Budget Committee on Defense hearing, which though scheduled to go unnoticed, made the cover of Time magazine March 7, 1983.

== Life and career ==
=== Early life ===
Spinney was born at Wright-Patterson Air Force Base, Ohio. The son of an Air Force colonel, Spinney graduated from Lehigh University in 1967 as a mechanical engineer. He began working as a Second Lieutenant engineer in the flight dynamics lab at Wright-Patterson Air Force Base in Ohio. In 1975 he left military life and eventually re-joined the Pentagon in 1977 as a civilian analyst in the Pentagon's Office of Program Analysis and Evaluation (better-known by its former name, Systems Analysis, set up in 1961 to make independent evaluations of Pentagon Policy) under his mentor, the famous fighter pilot Colonel John R. Boyd.

=== Intelligence career ===
Dubbed a maverick by Time magazine, he and Boyd shared an open contempt for authority and their Emperor's-New-Clothes-like critique of the military establishment in its spending frenzy.

In 1980 he assembled a three-hour briefing titled "Defense Facts of Life: The Plans-Reality Mismatch", which sharply criticized defense budgeting, arguing that the defense bureaucracy used unrealistic assumptions to buy into unsustainable programs, and explaining how the pursuit of complex technology produced expensive, scarce and inefficient weapons. Spinney spent the rest of his career refining and expanding this analysis. The report was largely ignored despite a growing reform movement, whose goal was to reduce military budget increases from 7% to 5% after inflation. Two years later, he expounded on his first report, including an analysis on the miscalculation of the burden costs of a majority of the weapon systems and re-titled it "Defense facts of life: The Plans/Reality Mismatch", which later became simply known as the "Spinney Report".

News of the report and its content quickly spread around the Air Force offices of the Pentagon and eventually reached Congress. Senator Chuck Grassley (R-Iowa) asked to interview its author, but was met with opposition from the Secretary of Defense Caspar W. Weinberger, and David S. C. Chu, Spinney's immediate superior, who tried to downplay the report saying it was neither factual nor represented the current budget and programs.

With Senator Grassley threatening to subpoena Spinney to testify in front of the Senate Budget Committee on Defense, the Pentagon agreed to hold a hearing on a Friday afternoon in a remote room, without cameras and with David S. C. Chu at his side for a rebuttal, hoping it would get lost in the weekend print media and not be part of the television news cycle.

Senator Grassley, who later would call Spinney the "conscience of the Pentagon", had the hearing moved to the same room as that of the McCarthy hearings and allowed the cameras. The Pentagon still hoped that the story would go unnoticed, until a painting of Spinney was printed on the cover of Time magazine the following Monday.

The press the report generated breathed new life into the defense budget reform movement, which eventually led to the 1985 military budget freeze. Spinney was hailed as the Pentagon whistleblower, fighting waste, fraud and abuse inside the Pentagon in many articles in the National Journal, Baltimore Sun, The New York Times and many others.

Spinney produced several other reports with titles such as "Shape Up and Fly Right: How to Build a Better Air Force for Less Money" which outlined a reform strategy for the Air Force that would reduce operating costs, or "Teach the Pentagon to Think Before It Spends", in which he wrote: "The Pentagon's strategists produce budgets that simply cannot be executed because they assume a defense strategy depends only on goals and threats. Strategy, however, is about possibilities, not hopes and dreams. By ignoring costs, U.S. strategists abdicate their responsibility for hard decisions."

Many of the systems criticized by the Defense Reform Movement, particularly the F-15 Eagle and the M-1 Abrams tank, however, performed well enough in the Gulf War and other combat arenas. This had the effect of questioning the validity of some of the movement's underlying assumptions, leading Spinney to issue a series of 500 of what he termed "E-mail Blasters" on the Internet publishing his criticisms and attacking his critics. These he circulated in the last years of his career to a wide distribution of journalists, military officers, Congressional staff, academics, and others.

In September 2000, in a Defense Weekly commentary, he called the move to increase the military budget from 2.9% to 4% of the GDP as " tantamount to a declaration of total war on Social Security and Medicare in the following decade."

In 2002, Spinney testified before the Subcommittee on National Security, Veterans Affairs and International Relations, part of the House Committee on Government Reform on Pentagon accounting and the increasing defense budget before the September 11, 2001 attacks.

=== After retirement ===
He retired in 2003 and that year received the "Good Government Award" of the Project on Government Oversight ("POGO"), an oversight think tank and watchdog group founded by Dina Rasor.

Since his retirement, he has written several articles for the CounterPunch on various military issues and in 2005, he participated in the documentary Why We Fight, in which he was interviewed on his sloop somewhere in the Caribbean. Spinney also served on the Military Advisers Committee for the Business Leaders for Sensible Priorities, whose mission was to reduce the amount of the discretionary budget going to the military by 15% and reallocate that money for education, healthcare, renewable energies, humanitarian aid, and reducing the deficit issues.

Since his retirement Spinney and his wife have lived on their sailboat, first in the Bahamas and more recently in the Mediterranean.

== Quotes ==
- "At the core of the RMA is a radical hypothesis that would cause Sun Tzu, Clausewitz and George Patton to roll over in their graves. That is, that technology will transform the fog and friction of combat – the uncertainty, fear, chaos, imperfect information which is a natural product of a clash between opposing wills – into clear, friction-free, predictable, mechanistic interaction."
- "If you want to understand how the Pentagon operates, like everything else in Washington, you follow the money."
- "We got out of the Vietnam effectively when the lottery started and middle class kids were getting killed. First thing that happened was that they went to this all volunteer army. And that solved that draft inequality problem, because everybody is a volunteer. And that makes the military much easier to use because: you are fucking volunteers, screw you, you signed up for this. You know, the objections [against going to war] don't carry as much water."

== Published works ==
Defense Facts of Life: The Plans/Reality Mismatch, Westview Press; Hardcover April 1985 ISBN 0-86531-718-6; Paperback May 1985 ISBN 0-86531-719-4.

- Available online as a .pdf
