= Kai Newkirk =

American activist and organizer (born 1980)

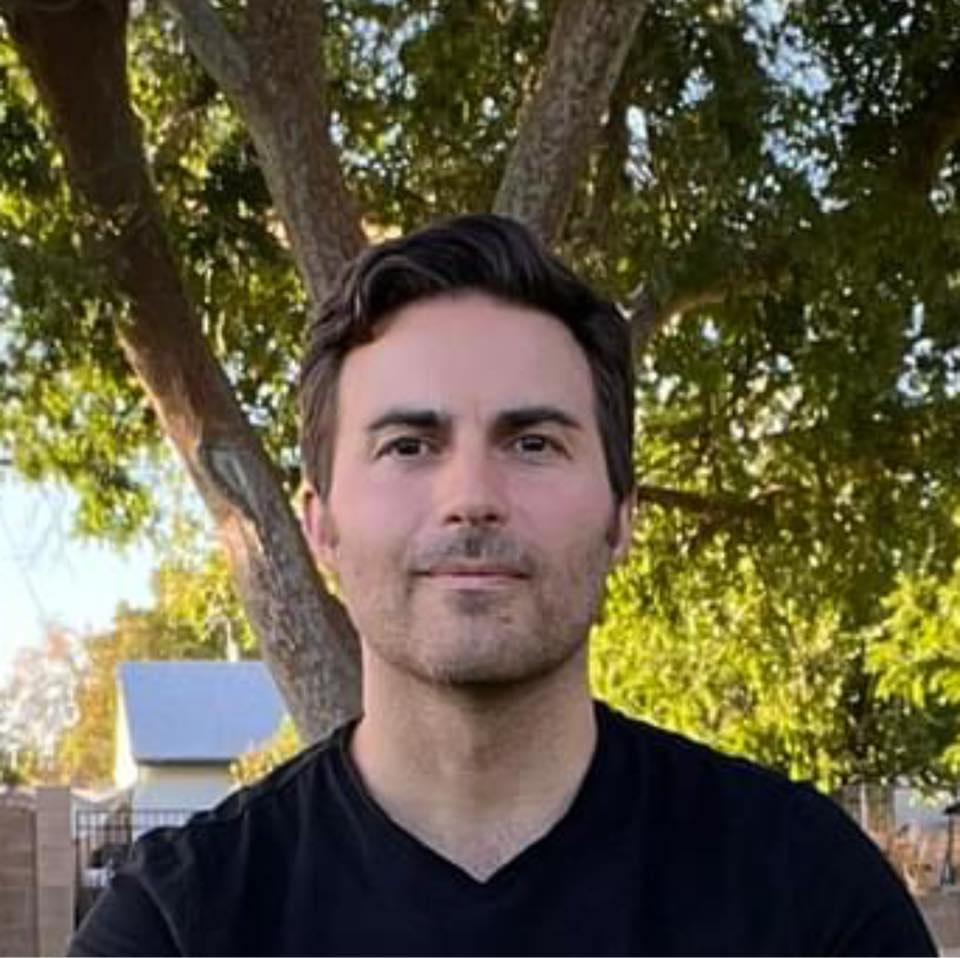
- Newkirk in 2024
- Born: Noah Kai Newkirk; August 26, 1980 (age 46); Hinton, West Virginia, U.S.
- Education: Hampshire College (BA)
- Known for: Co-founder of 99Rise; Lead organizer of Democracy Spring; Disrupting Citizens United v. FEC arguments at the U.S. Supreme Court
- Political party: Democratic
- Spouse: Erika Andiola (m. 2020)
- Website: Campaign website

Noah Kai Newkirk (born August 26, 1980) is an American organizer and activist. He co-founded the campaign-finance reform group 99Rise in 2012 and was the lead organizer of Democracy Spring, a 2016 sit-in at the United States Capitol in which more than 400 people were arrested in a single day demanding action on campaign-finance and voting-rights legislation.

Newkirk first drew national attention in February 2014, when he interrupted oral arguments at the Supreme Court of the United States in a protest against Citizens United v. FEC; the action was captured in what was widely reported as the first publicly released video recording from inside the Court's chamber. He has since organized protests directed at Donald Trump, Kyrsten Sinema, and Joe Biden.

Newkirk founded For All, a Tempe-based "center for nonviolent action and organizing," and has served as co-chair of the Arizona Democratic Party's Progressive Council, where he supported the party's "People's Primary" resolution barring corporate and billionaire contributions in primary races. In 2026, he unsuccessfully challenged U.S. Representative Greg Stanton in the Democratic primary for Arizona's 4th congressional district.

== Early life ==
Newkirk was born in Hinton, West Virginia. He has said his organizing work began with the 1999 World Trade Organization protests in Seattle.

== Activism ==
=== 99Rise and Supreme Court disruption (2014) ===
In 2012, Newkirk co-founded 99Rise, a Los Angeles-based group inspired by Occupy Wall Street that aimed to build sustained nonviolent civil disobedience against the influence of money in politics.

On February 26, 2014, Newkirk stood up during oral argument at the Supreme Court and called on the justices to overturn the Citizens United ruling. Other 99Rise activists secretly filmed the disruption, and the group later released the footage, which was widely reported as the first publicly released video from inside the Court's chamber. Newkirk was arrested at the protest and was later barred from Supreme Court premises following his conviction. Vice described him in a profile that year as a "longtime labor and environmental activist who cut his teeth in the global justice movement," and reported his goal of recruiting "a nonviolent army" of at least 10,000 people willing to commit civil disobedience to overturn Citizens United.

In 2014, Newkirk also led 99Rise's 480-mile, 37-day California "March for Democracy" from Los Angeles City Hall to the California State Capitol in Sacramento, followed by twelve days of sit-ins at the Capitol.

=== Republican presidential debate disruption (2015) ===
On December 15, 2015, Newkirk interrupted Donald Trump from the balcony during the CNN Republican presidential debate in Las Vegas, shouting that "the American people deserve free and fair elections, not billionaire auctions" before being removed from the venue. Bustle profiled him afterward as the "heckler" who had previously made headlines for secretly recording a Supreme Court proceeding.

=== Democracy Spring (2016) ===
Newkirk was the campaign director and lead organizer of Democracy Spring, a coalition that staged a ten-day march from Philadelphia to Washington, D.C. followed by sit-ins at the U.S. Capitol from April 11–18, 2016, demanding congressional action on campaign-finance and voting-rights legislation. Democracy Now! reported on April 12, 2016, that more than 400 people had been arrested on the first day of the Capitol sit-ins, with arrests continuing across the week. Actor Mark Ruffalo pledged to join the sit-in. Newkirk also addressed delegates outside the 2016 Democratic National Convention in Philadelphia in a C-SPAN segment carried during Washington Journal.

=== Sinema primary pledge (2021–2022) ===
After moving to Arizona, Newkirk founded the Arizona Coalition to End the Filibuster. In September 2021, the coalition launched a Crowdpac pledge campaign threatening to fund a Democratic primary challenger to U.S. Senator Kyrsten Sinema unless she voted to end or reform the Senate filibuster and to advance President Joe Biden's Build Back Better agenda. NBC News described the effort as one of several progressive operations attempting to lay the groundwork for a primary challenge to Sinema in 2024. The Daily Beast identified Newkirk as the leader of the Arizona-based effort and quoted him saying that "we're coming down to multiple inflection points of just tremendous significance for the country. We have to move her now. 2024 is too late."

=== For All ===
Newkirk is the founder and president of For All, a Tempe-based "center for nonviolent action and organizing" grounded in the nonviolent tradition of Martin Luther King Jr., Mohandas Gandhi, and Dolores Huerta. On September 28, 2023, he interrupted President Joe Biden during a speech at the Tempe Center for the Arts, shouting "Why have you yet to declare a climate emergency?" Biden offered to meet with him after the speech.

In November 2024, Newkirk was among nine people arrested at a White House sit-in calling for a U.S. arms embargo on Israel over the Gaza war.

=== Arizona Progressive Council (2024–present) ===
Newkirk has served as co-chair of the Arizona Democratic Party's Progressive Council and supported the "People's Primary" resolution, which would bar corporate and billionaire contributions in the party's primary races. He commissioned polling in support of the proposal and gathered the signatures needed to force a special party meeting on it, aiming to establish the practice ahead of the August 4, 2026 primary. Arizona Capitol Times reported in January 2026 that the resolution had divided state Democrats over outside spending.

== Political views ==
Newkirk has identified as a democratic socialist and has described his political framework as grounded in the nonviolent traditions of Martin Luther King Jr., Mohandas Gandhi, and Dolores Huerta. His activism has centered on campaign finance reform, voting rights, and climate action, pursued through nonviolent civil disobedience. In a 2014 interview with Vice, he framed campaign finance reform as foundational to his other political goals, saying that "if we don't take on corruption and get big money out of politics, then we're not going to be able to do anything else." In a separate 2014 interview, he said, "It should be the votes that matter, not the size of your wallet." At the 2015 Republican presidential debate, he characterized the role of money in politics as "billionaire auctions" rather than "free and fair elections."

In a 2021 essay in Waging Nonviolence co-authored with the Rev. Stephen A. Green, Newkirk advocated what he and Green called "Kingian democratic socialism," defining it as "the fusion of King's prophetic social vision, fully including his radical critiques not only of racism but also of capitalism and militarism, with his revolutionary methods of social change," and distinguishing it from other forms of socialism by what they described as an uncompromising commitment to political democracy and civil liberty. The essay was republished by Common Dreams, and Newkirk and Green discussed the framework on a December 2021 episode of Rev. Mark A. Thompson's podcast Make It Plain.

Newkirk has called on the U.S. government to declare a climate emergency and to enact an arms embargo on Israel during the Gaza war, framing the demand as one of upholding international humanitarian law.

== 2026 candidacy for U.S. House ==
On March 12, 2026, Newkirk announced a Democratic primary challenge to incumbent U.S. Representative Greg Stanton in Arizona's 4th congressional district, which covers Tempe and parts of the East Valley. His campaign platform calls for disbanding ICE, Medicare for All, an end to U.S. military aid to Israel, and tuition-free public college. Newkirk has stated that the campaign refuses contributions from corporate political action committees, AIPAC, and billionaire-funded super PACs, relying instead on small-dollar grassroots donations. Asked in 2026 whether he identified as a "democratic socialist," Newkirk said that he did.

In July 2026, the Young Democrats of Arizona withdrew its endorsement of Newkirk, citing unspecified "concerning patterns of behavior," and Tempe city councilmember Bobby Nichols also withdrew his endorsement. The withdrawals followed renewed circulation of a 2019 article on the website Popular Resistance that criticized Newkirk's organizing in West Virginia and alleged that he had "groomed" young women activists, some of whom he had consensual relationships with. The article was later removed, and one of its authors, Anne Meador, disavowed it as inaccurate and below basic journalistic standards. Newkirk called the article "defamatory" and "character assassination." In a rebuttal memo, he acknowledged taking part since 2016 in "a process of recovery in relation to patterns in intimate relationships," but stated that he "has never enacted or been accused by anyone of sexual assault, abuse, exploitation, or any criminal behavior." He called the withdrawal a "weaponization of … disavowed misinformation." Stanton won the primary on July 21, 2026.

== Personal life ==
Newkirk married progressive activist and immigrant-rights leader Erika Andiola in 2020. He teaches mindfulness meditation in Tempe and founded the Salt River Mindfulness Meditation Community.
