= Lawrence Korb =

American foreign policy analyst (1939–2026)

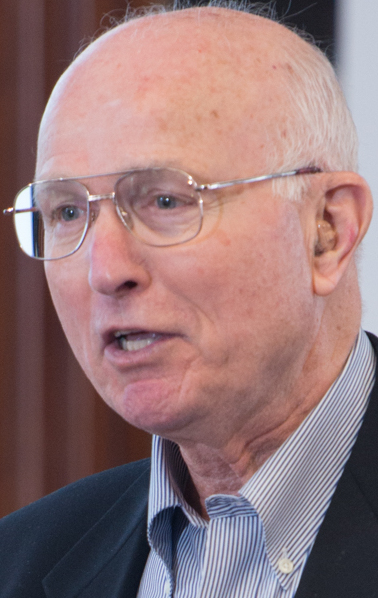
- Korb in 2018

Assistant Secretary of Defense for Logistics and Materiel Readiness
- In office May 4, 1981 – July 5, 1985
- President: Ronald Reagan
- Preceded by: Robert B. Pirie Jr.
- Succeeded by: James P. Wade

Personal details
- Born: Lawrence Joseph Korb Sr. July 9, 1939 New York City, U.S.
- Died: April 20, 2026 (aged 86)
- Occupation: Senior fellow at the Center for American Progress; Senior advisor to the Center for Defense Information

Lawrence Joseph Korb Sr. (July 9, 1939 – April 20, 2026) was an American Navy officer, academic, and political analyst who was a senior fellow at the Center for American Progress and a senior adviser to the Center for Defense Information. He was once director of national security studies at the Council on Foreign Relations in New York.

== Education and naval service ==
Korb attended the Athenaeum of Ohio, where he earned his bachelor of arts degree in 1961. Going on to St. John's University, he obtained his master's degree in 1962, before joining the U.S. Navy in 1962. Korb served on active duty for four years as a naval flight officer and was a crew member on a P-3 Orion surveillance plane in Vietnam. He later transferred to the Naval Reserve, and retired with the rank of Captain. On completing his active duty, Korb returned to graduate school, where he received his Ph.D. at the State University of New York Albany in 1969. Korb served as Associate Professor of Government at the U.S. Coast Guard Academy from 1971 to 1975 and later Professor of Management at the Naval War College from 1975 to 1980.

== Government career ==
Korb served as adviser to the Reagan–Bush election committee in 1980 and was then appointed Assistant Secretary of Defense (Manpower, Reserve Affairs, Installations and Logistics) from 1981 to 1985. In that position, he administered about 70 percent of the defense budget. For his service he was awarded the Department of Defense Medal for Distinguished Public Service.

== Career in academic administration, on boards, and in advisory work ==
In 1987, Korb was elected as a fellow of the National Academy of Public Administration. Korb was a Senior Fellow and Director of National Security Studies at the Council on Foreign Relations. From July 1998 to October 2002, he was Council Vice President, Director of Studies, and holder of the Maurice Greenberg Chair. Prior to joining the Council, Korb served as Director of the Center for Public Policy Education and Senior Fellow in the Foreign Policy Studies Program at the Brookings Institution, dean of the Graduate School of Public and International Affairs at the University of Pittsburgh, and Vice President of Corporate Operations at the Raytheon Company.

In 2005 Korb, Robert O. Boorstin, and the National Security Staff of the Center for American Progress published a position paper called "Integrated Power: A National Security Strategy for the 21st Century." In it they criticized President George W. Bush for the invasion of Iraq and for the perceived inadequacy of resources devoted to the fight against Islamic fundamentalism. The authors also detailed plans to increase the manpower of the United States Army, to prevent terrorists from acquiring weapons of mass destruction, to spread liberal democratic values throughout the Middle East, and to reduce American dependence on foreign oil.

Korb was also a member of the Honorary Board of the Servicemembers Legal Defense Network, an organization dedicated to ending discrimination against gay and lesbian servicemembers of the U.S. military, and to repealing the Don't ask, don't tell policy. Korb also served on the military adviser committee for Business Leaders for Sensible Priorities, whose aim was to redirect 15 percent of the military's budget to social programs like education, healthcare, job training, humanitarian relief, renewable energies, and deficit reduction. In 2008, Korb worked as an advisor on the first Hillary Clinton presidential campaign.

== Death ==
Korb died on April 20, 2026, at the age of 86.

== Published works ==
Korb's 20 books on national security issues include:

- The Joint Chiefs of Staff: The First Twenty-five Years (1976)
- The System for Educating Military Officers in the U.S. (1976)
- The Fall and Rise of the Pentagon (1979)
- American National Security: Policy and Process (1989)
- Future Visions for U.S. Defense Policy
- Reshaping America's Military
- A New National Security Strategy in an Age of Terrorists, Tyrants, and Weapons of Mass Destruction.

Korb's more than 100 articles appeared in such journals as Foreign Affairs, Public Administration Review, the New York Times Sunday Magazine, Naval Institute Proceedings, and International Security.

His more than 100 op-ed pieces appeared in such major newspapers as the Washington Post, New York Times, Wall Street Journal, Washington Times, Los Angeles Times, Boston Globe, Baltimore Sun, Philadelphia Inquirer, and the Christian Science Monitor.

== Television appearances ==
From the past decade, Korb made over a thousand appearances as a commentator on such shows as Countdown with Keith Olbermann, The Today Show, The Early Show, Good Morning America, Face the Nation, This Week With David Brinkley, the MacNeil/Lehrer News Hour, News Hour with Jim Lehrer, Nightline, 60 Minutes, Frontline, Larry King Live, the O'Reilly Factor, Crossfire and Al-Jazeera News Hour.
