= Business Leaders for Sensible Priorities =

American business organization advocating for reallocation of defense funding

Business Leaders for Sensible Priorities (BLSP) was a US non-profit organization composed of 700 business leaders. It was founded by Ben Cohen, co-founder of Ben and Jerry's. In late 2008, the organization became a project of the Center for American Progress (CAP) and was put under the direction of Krisila Benson. The campaign's goal was to shift taxpayer money away from military programs to social programs like education, healthcare, alternative energies and deficit reduction.

The Business Leaders for Sensible Priorities was supported by retired generals, admirals and defense planners from Republican and Democratic administrations who urged cuts in American defense spending to provide funding for social and economic programs. Membership includes business leaders and former military officers and advisors like Lawrence Korb, retired Vice Admiral Jack Shanahan, Ted Turner, Paul Newman, R. Warren Langley, Frank Spinney and Stansfield Turner.

Ben Cohen explains the discretionary budget using Oreo cookies and the U.S.’s nuclear stockpile using BBs.
