= Cristina Ibarra =

American documentary filmmaker

- Cristina Ibarra
- Education: University of Texas
- Notable work: Las Marthas; The Last Conquistado; Dirty Laundry
- Style: Mexican American History, Non-fiction and Fiction, Documentaries, Mexican Traditions
- Spouse: Alex Rivera
- Awards: Las Marthas: Best US Latino Film of the Year Dirty Laundry: A Homemade Telenovela: Best short fiction at CineFestival, San Antonio, TX; Jury Award; Latino Lens, WNET

Cristina Ibarra is an American documentary filmmaker who currently lives in Brooklyn, NY. She was a Rauschenberg Fellow, Rockefeller Fellow, a New York Foundation for the Arts Fellow, and a MacArthur Fellow.

== Early life and education ==
Cristina Ibarra was the first born kid of a middle class immigrant family from Mexico. She grew up in El Paso, Texas, and Ciudad Juarez, Mexico.

Ibarra was the first one in her family to go away to college at University of Texas in Austin. Ibarra first decided to study law because of her immigrant background. Later she found out herself interested in media courses and Chicana history courses so that she finally decided to study filmmaking, and graduated in 1997 with Bachelor of Art degree in Radio-Television-Film

During her college life, she was also in Chicano/Latino film Forum MEChA (Movimiento Estudiantil Chicanx de Aztlan (M.E.Ch.A.).

Ibarra is a Rockefeller Fellow, a New York Foundation for the Arts fellow, and a CPB/PBS Producers Academy Fellow. She is a member of the National Association of Latino Independent Producers, a founding member of fulana, a Latina multi-media collaborative and SubCine, the first Latino self-distribution collective.

== Filmography ==
Ibarra's filmography includes:

- Las Marthas
  - Director
  - Synopsis: Las Marthas story set in the south Texas border town of Laredo, telling a century-long tradition in which debutantes from both sides of the border, in order to commemorate George Washington's birthday. Two of the Society Daughters invited in this special ceremony, are the main character of this documentary film. One is Laurita, who is the thirteenth young woman in her family to debut. Another one is Rosario, who is the first in her family to debut. They grow up in different environment, have different opinions, represent two different sides' culture. This film unravels the origins of this celebration ceremony, and explores the reason why a town with deep Mexican root like Laredo can feel so much for the America's Founding Father.
  - Awards：The film is a recipient of the Tribeca Institute's Heineken VOCES Documentary Award, as well as funding from LPB, Jerome Foundation, and Humanities Texas.
    - 2014 Jury Award, CineFestival
    - Best US Latino Film of the Year, Cinema Tropical
    - 2012 Heineken Voces Documentary Award Recipient
  - Comments: From The New York Times: "It is a striking alternative portrait of border-town life", "was bucking stereotypes firmly entrenched in the cultural consciousness", "fascinating look as a world barely known outside of Texas..."
  - Her opinion/statement about this movie: Ibarra herself grew up along the border, that is why she is so interested in "telling stories that look at the border in a new way". Ten years ago, she visited her cousin in Laredo. That when the original idea of Las Marthas was born.
- The Infiltrators
- The Last Conquistador
  - About： Ibarra's first hour-long PBS documentary, created with John Valadez, and had a national broadcast on POV.
  - Synopsis: In this episode shows us a famous sculptor John Houser. His dream is to build the world's tallest bronze equestrian statue for the city of El Paso, Texas.
- Dirty Laundry: A Homemade Telenovela
  - About: A short comedy created and directed by Ibarra. It tells a story about an American girl's sexual coming-of-age in a Mexican American family.
  - Awards：Her award-winning directorial debut, Dirty Laundry: A Homemade Telenovela, was broadcast nationwide on the PBS series ColorVision.
- Grandma's Hip Hop
- Love and Monster Trucks (In Progress)
  - Synopsis:Love & Monster Trucks is a feature-length narrative film currently in development. 18-year-old Chicana artist, Impala Mata, can't wait to escape her 4x4 truck-obsessed, Texas bordertown family. But the summer before she's supposed to leave for college, she falls in love with a girl—a truck-racer, no less—and suddenly, Impala finds herself drawn back into her family's 4x4 world, in ways she never expected
  - About：Love & Monster Trucks is inspired by writer/director Cristina Ibarra's experiences growing up around her family’s trucks, modifying shops, junkyards, and car lots, on both sides of the U.S./Mexico border

== Other projects ==
Other projects by Ibarra include:

- 1999–2011 Member of NALIP
- 2000–2008 Member of fulana
- 2001–2008 The producer/director of The Last Conquistador
- 2005–2008 Grantee of Creative Capital
- 2000–2011 Filmmaker of NYILFF
- 2009–2011 Filmmaker of Undocumented Films
- 2014–present Independent Filmmaker of Pueblo Sight & Sound
- 2008–2008 Filmmaker of American Documentary POV

== Style and themes ==
Ibarra's primarily styles and themes are descendent from the Latino culture. First and foremost representing the Mexican culture/traditions. The representation of US/Mexico border is one of the main influences that can be seen across her films. Ibarra's film styles and themes include:

- Mexican American History
- Non-Fiction and Fiction
- Documentaries
- U.S.–Mexico Border
- Mexican Traditions
- Representation of Underrepresented Minorities in the country.

Throughout interviews and personal ideologies Ibarra has expressed the following as her main themes enclosed on her filmsExploration of Mexican-American Identity

- Expressing herself in ways that takes her back "Home" to where she grew up. Meaning to give a clear emphasis of her work.
- Exploration of cultural landscapes through perspectives never seen before.
- Her mission is to depict films in the way that Americans who do not know much about the Latino community, are able to understand that beyond the border not every Latino is an immigrant.
- The breakdown of Latino stereotypes to understand more about the culture, and what role Mexicans play among American public.
- To understand what is stronger within the Latino community. Whether is family bonds or national borders

Ibarra is focused also in representing and advocating for Women in the business of filmmaking. As director and producer she has had experienced as working with both men and women, while filming projects. She mentions that through her journey in the creative process that the only difference is that between men and women, that men are more focused on the ending results. Where women are more interested in the process and how the story is develop and explained. However; she highlights that both interests are equally important for the development of film.

== Awards, nomination, and honors ==
Ibarra was awarded a MacArthur Fellowship in 2021.

Film	Year	Award Title	Role
Las Marthas	2014	Jury Award, CineFestival	Producer, Director
	2014	Best US Latino Film of the Year, Cinema Tropical	
	2012	Heineken Voces Documentary Award Recipient	
The Last Conquistado	2008	National broadcast on POV	Producer, Director
Dirty Laundry: A Homemade Telenovela	2001	Best Short Fiction at CineFestival, San Antonio, TX	Producer, Director
	2001	IFP's Buzz Cuts	
	2001	Latino Lens, WNET	
	2001	Through the Lens, WYBE	
	2001	Jury Award, ImageNation, NYC	
	2001	Finalist, MOXIE! Film Festival in Santa Monica, CA	
	2001	Finalist, Arizona Film Festival	
Grandma's Hip Hop	2001	Award-winning satire	Producer
Lupe From the Block and Amnezac	2001	Award-winning satire	Producer
To Be Heard	2011	Nominated for the DOC U! Award in Amsterdam International Documentary Film Festival	Assistant Editor
	2010	Audience Award & Metropolis Grand Jury Prize, DOC NYC	
	2011	Audience Award, Nantucket Film Festival	
	2011	Audience Award – Honorable Mention, Philadelphia Film Festival	
	2011	Jury Award, San Diego Latino Film Festival	
	2011	Audience Award, Sarasota Film Festival	
	2011	Audience Award & Documentary Special Jury Award, Sarasota Film Festival	
	2012	Festival Prize, Victoria Film Festival, Canada	
