= Las Marthas =

- Directed by: Cristina Ibarra
- Produced by: Cristina Ibarra, Erin Ploss-Campoamor
- Starring: Laura Garza Hovel, Rosario Reyes
- Cinematography: Natalia Almada, Craig Marsden, Ray Santisteban
- Edited by: Carla Gutierrez, Sonia Gonzalez-Martinez
- Music by: David Majzlin
- Distributed by: Women Make Movies
- Release date: February 17, 2014
- Running time: 69 minutes
- Country: United States
- Languages: English, Spanish (English subtitles)

Las Marthas is a 2014 documentary film directed by Cristina Ibarra, which follows two young women on their journey to their debut in 19th-century-inspired gowns at an event hosted by the Society of Martha Washington.

== Synopsis ==
Las Marthas is a documentary film directed by Cristina Ibarra, who follows two young women, Laurita Garza Hovel—a prominent member of Laredo society—and Rosario Reyes—a newcomer from Mexico—while on their journey to make to their debut at an event hosted by the Society of Martha Washington.

The film displays an, "alternative image of the border-town life" thought documenting the debutante dance where young women wear Colonial style gowns in an effort to portray early American historical figures.

Through various interviews of historians, former "Marthas" and current debutantes, Ibarra tackles the question as to why these young women are embracing a tradition that is honoring a symbol of American conquest from Mexican territories.

== Interviews ==
- Linda Leyendecker Gutierrez, designer of debutantes' gowns
- Rosario Reyes, guest of Las Marthas
- Laura Garza- Hovel, Legacy daughter
- Dr. Norma Cantú, professor of English and U.S. Latina/o literature, University of Texas at San Antonio
- Dr. Josefina Saldaña-Portillo, director of undergraduate studies, department of social and cultural analysis, New York University

== Production ==
Las Marthas was by the Jerome Foundation, Latino Public Broadcasting, Independent Television Service, Diversity Development Fund and Texas Humanities, and was broadcast nationally on Independent Lens on February 17, 2014.

== Critical reception and reviews ==
The New York Times called Las Marthas "a striking alternative portrait of border-town life..." According to Charles Ramirez Berg, a professor of film studies at the University of Texas at Austin, Las Marthas "was bucking stereotypes firmly entrenched in the cultural consciousness". The Laredo Sun stated that the film was a "fascinating look as a world barely known outside of Texas..." and Colorlines applauded the film for its ability to "illustrate how an economically fluid reality, defined by new money sometimes from just over the border" is challenged by the "elite past" of Laredo.

== Awards ==
- 2014 Jury Award, CineFestival
- Best US Latino Film of the Year, Cinema Tropical
- 2012 Heineken Voces Documentary Award Recipient.

== Festivals and screenings ==
- Ambulante California
- San Diego Latino Film Festival
- CineFestival San Antonio
- Chicago Latino Film Festival

== Special collections ==
Latinas in America: Exploring the Latina Experience
