= El Hielo (ICE) =

2013 music video by La Santa Cecilia

The band La Santa Cecilia released the song El Hielo (ICE) from their album Treinta Días in early April 2013. El Hielo (ICE) provides an insightful perspective of the problems of illegal immigration to the United States through the lives of three characters. The video demonstrates the struggles of the undocumented trying to provide a secure life for themselves and their families. The music video was shot in Los Angeles, California in March and the cast included people from Los Angeles and Arizona. ICE El Hielo has been mentioned as being “something of an anthem for immigration reform.” In just nine days after the video's release, the official music video collected over 315,000 views on YouTube. The video gained notice by mainstream media for its conveyed messages on immigration and critiques of U.S. Immigration and Customs Enforcement (ICE).

== Context of the music video ==
=== Synopsis ===
The video begins with an image of an ICE officer's weapon, handcuffs, and vest. It then switches to the lives of three characters, Martha, Juan, and Jose. Martha was young when she came to the U.S. illegally and has hopes of obtaining an education. Jose is also an immigrant who was a taxi driver in his country, but that doesn't permit him to drive in the U.S. Jose and Martha are separately seen watching the news of people being deported from their jobs. Juan is a young man whose background is not mentioned as much as the other characters, but it is shown that he has a family. All three characters are seen going to work, and it is revealed that Jose and Martha work together in a restaurant. Juan is then seen working as an ICE officer where he and a couple of other ICE officers go to the restaurant where Jose and Martha work. Martha tries to escape but is surrounded, along with Jose, by ICE officers. Juan sadly looks at them before taking them into custody. The video switches to Martha's family as they tearfully look at the television where they see Martha being deported. The video ends with a statement that explains how most of the actors in the video are undocumented. It then states that two of the actors have been placed in deportation proceedings, and a parent of one of the actors is in the process of being deported.

=== Inspiration ===
The inspiration for the song came when the group had begun to work on their new album and wanted to share the experiences of their parents' illegal migration to the U.S. In an interview, the lead singer Marisol Hernandez discusses how the challenges her family have faced served as inspiration for ICE;El Hielo. She comments that her parents immigrated to the U.S. in the late 60s. Her mother cleaned houses and offices while also working as a babysitter. When Marisol's great-grandmother died, her mother was distraught and couldn't miss the funeral. Her mother went to Mexico but it caused her to be away from her family for a long time. Marisol also discusses the challenges her bandmate Pepe Carlos has endured for being undocumented. When the band receives gigs outside of California, the situation becomes complicated for the group because of Pepe's undocumented status. There are times where he will go with them and they have to take different routes to avoid checkpoints. However, when the band has been invited to play in Mexico, he has had to stay behind.

=== ICE ===
As mentioned above, this track does indeed take a subtle whack at ICE—otherwise known as U.S. Immigration and Customs Enforcement—and Uncle Sam's immigration policy in general. “ICE is the largest investigative agency in the United States Department of Homeland Security (DHS).”

=== Lyrical interpretation ===
The lyrics, “set to a bouncy bossa nova groove”, tell the stories of three hardworking undocumented characters who fear separation from their families because, “ICE is loose out on the streets”, as the chorus clearly states. The lyrics were inspired by three people close to the band. For example, the story of Eva, who is a housekeeper herself and represents the life and daily situations that many domestic workers face in regards to deportation. In the first half of the first verse, La Marisoul sings, “Eva using a rag to wipe clean the table/Cautiously making everything shine like a pearl/When the boss gets home, she hopes there’ll be no complaints/Accusing her of being illegal.” The chorus then addresses the stories of families that have been separated by deportations of the Immigrant and Customs Enforcement (ICE). One of the most moving visuals of the lyrics is found in the line about children crying at school, when they realize that their mom is not coming to pick them up. It states that ICE is on the loose and one never knows who the next unfortunate victim will be. “Some stay here, the other stays there/This is what happens when you go out to make a living”.

== The Band: Santa Cecilia ==
The band Santa Cecilia have been previously nominated for a Latin Grammy Award for their song “La Negra”. La Santa Cecilia began to gain national attention and recognition after exposure on hit TV shows Weeds and Entourage.

=== Contribution to Immigration Reform ===
On April 9, the band attended an immigration reform rally in Phoenix, Arizona. On April 10, they attended an immigration rally in Capital Hill in Washington, D.C. where they sang this song and marched to the ICE offices. The number of expectancy was 25,000 people, but instead 100,000 people came out in support.

== The Director: Alex Rivera ==
Alex Rivera is the director of the video for ICE;El Hielo and has been a filmmaker for fifteen years. One of his most recognized films, Sleep Dealer, a science-fiction feature set on the U.S./Mexico border, won many awards at the Sundance Film Festival and the Berlin International Film Festival.

== Main characters ==
These are some of the main characters from the video:

- Jose is a gardener who works tirelessly to make gardens as beautiful as Disneyland. Though he was a taxi driver in his home country, he is denied access to a drivers license which makes him vulnerable to deportation just for making a living. His character also represents people who have had better jobs back in their country of origin but their work experience is deemed invalid once in the U.S.
- Martha works at a restaurant as a waitress who immigrated to the U.S. at a young age. This character is based on a good friend of the band who is determined in pursuing a higher education, despite the many obstacles she faces. The character's story represents the many voices of Dreamers who continue to face many obstacles in pursuing their goals and dreams.
- Eva: La Santa Cecilia's vocalist, Marisoul Hernandez, says that one of the characters in the music video for El Hielo (ICE) is based on her mother, Eva, who makes ends meet cleaning homes.

== Actors ==
These are the actors who participated in the making of the music video:

- Isaac Barrera “is an undocumented immigrant and organizer with the Immigrant Youth Coalition in Los Angeles. Isaac spent two and a half weeks in detention after being purposefully arrested by border patrol in Alabama in order to expose the inhumane treatment of immigrants in detention. His case is still pending.”
- Maria Arreola (Eva) “(Erika’s mom) came to the United States to provide a better life for her children but was arrested by ICE agents Maria this past winter. After being detained, she was placed on a bus to be deported to Mexico only to have it turned around as a result of the national outcry organized by her daughter. She was given one year of deferred action but may face deportation orders again in 2014.”
- Erika Andiola (Martha) “is a graduate of Arizona State University, Erika Andiola moved from Mexico to Arizona when she was 11 years old and later became a co-founder of DRM Capitol Group and the Arizona Dream Act Coalition (ADAC). When ICE raided her home and took her mother and older brother, Erika’s case became nationally known when she mobilized hundreds of thousands to stop their deportations.”
- Juan Romero (Jose) “is a day laborer who looks for work outside a Los Angeles Home Depot where he meets contractors for temporary home construction jobs. He has been an actor in the community drama troupe, Teatro Jornalero, since 2010. He hasn’t seen his wife since he came to the US.”

== Organizations ==
The production of the video was sponsored by two organizations, the NDLON (National Day Laborer Organizing Network) and the abc* Foundations’ Healing Power of Music Initiative. In May 2010, NDLON organized a march against Arizona's SB1070 law that included a performance by the deceased singer Jenni Rivera. Alex Rivera and NDLON have previously partnered to produce music videos for artists like Manu Chao and Ana Tijoux, in order to raise awareness of the effects of the current immigration system.“The abc* Foundation’s Healing Power of Music project aims to unite people across the Americas through music, and to inspire a movement that embraces peace while celebrating cultural diversity.”. In 2012, the lead singer of La Santa Cecilia, Marisol Hernandez, collaborated with the abc* Foundation to produce a music video for Mexico Lindo y Querido.
