= Garret John LoPorto =

American political activist (born 1976)

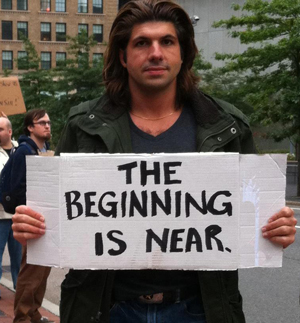
- "The beginning is near." ~ Garret John LoPorto
- Education: University of Massachusetts Amherst
- Writing career
- Language: English
- Genre: Non-fiction
- Subjects: Disruptive innovation, Neurodiversity, ADHD
- Website: garretjohn.com

Garret LoPorto (born in 1976) is an American activist, author, speaker, entrepreneur and inventor. In 2010 Garret recorded and released a speech (later becoming a viral YouTube video, reaching over 6 million views) where he called out to reform what he referred to as "the establishment."

He has authored books on the subjects of neurodiversity and the psychology behind disruptive innovation. He also founded and operates UPRISER.com. He has worked for Microsoft Research, United States presidential campaigns, and was a founder and chief executive officer (CEO) of a technology and media company.

== Career ==
Garret LoPorto graduated from the University of Massachusetts Amherst in 1999, where he majored in computer systems engineering, with a minor in computer science. LoPorto was a member of the United States Army ROTC and Theta Chi fraternity. He worked as a computer graphics specialist, systems administrator, and webmaster. LoPorto then went on to develop multi-player gaming at Microsoft Research.

LoPorto was a senior creative consultant on internet marketing for TrueMajority.org and the 2004 John Kerry presidential campaign. LoPorto is the founder of Quantum Light Marketing with for-profit and non-profit clients. In April 2004 LoPorto created a web video spoof of "The Apprentice" ads called "Trump Fires Bush", which was featured on CNN's Crossfire (TV series).

== Activism ==
In 1999 Garret LoPorto (23) started "Save Ben & Jerry's," a protest to stop Ben & Jerry's (a then independent model for socially responsible business) from being forcefully acquired by the multinational conglomerate, Unilever. LoPorto attracted international attention and press coverage for this protest. This included LoPorto putting Ben & Jerry's up for sale on eBay, with a record reserve price of $250 million.

In September 2011, LoPorto joined Occupy Wall Street in New York City, and on 96.9 FM Conservative Talk Radio was described as one of the organisers of Occupy Boston

== Published works ==
LoPorto has written on neurodiversity and the psychology behind disruptive innovation, and the diagnostic criteria for ADHD, although he lacks any formal qualification in Neuroscience, Medicine or Psychology respectively.

- His first book, The DaVinci Method, was published in 2005. In The DaVinci Method LoPorto argues that there is a genetically inherited trait, which accounts for much the atypical neurology found in great problem solvers, mystics, visionaries, innovators, pioneers and creative risk takers. He also argues that this same trait leads to ADHD, dyslexia, addiction and many other afflictions common to this group. He terms people with this trait DaVinci Types, and cites Renaissance artist and inventor Leonardo da Vinci as one of the people who had it. He then describes a variety of strategies that people who have this trait can use to achieve their potential. LoPorto cites psychoanalyst Otto Rank as a primary inspiration for this book.
- The Wayseers explores the neurological and genetic predisposition to disruptive innovation and "seeing around corners," that he claims virtually all great artists, visionaries and innovators share.
