= Society of Martha Washington =

The Society of Martha Washington was formed in 1939, in Laredo, Texas. The Society hosts the Colonial Ball, which is an annual debutante ball where young women make their debut into society. The Colonial Ball is held at the Laredo Civic Center and is a part of a citywide festival called the Washington's Birthday Celebration, which takes place in February every year. The Society of Martha Washington helps Laredo present an image of “racial and national harmony” by working in conjunction with the Princess Pocahontas Council, and the Abrazo Children.

== Membership ==
Membership of the Society is exclusive, yet there is no discrimination based on race or ethnicity. Unlike the debutante balls from the early 1900s up north, where racial and ethnic differences were implied as a definition of social class, Modern Laredo's elite consists of bicultural individuals. The Society was founded with bicultural roots. As a result, a good number of the girls who are presented are Latinas. Members who are chosen for the Society usually come from a small group of old families.

== The pageant ==
The society chooses two prominent members of Laredo's society to portray President George and Martha Dandridge Washington. The debutantes that are presented every year as well as their escorts, either have family in the Society or are invited as guests. The participants portray contemporaries based on the story line, which changes every year, that come out to honor the President and his First Lady.

== See also ==
- Las Marthas, a 2014 documentary film about two women taking part in the Society of Martha Washington ball
