= Jerry Greenfield =

American businessman, philanthropist, and activist (born 1951)

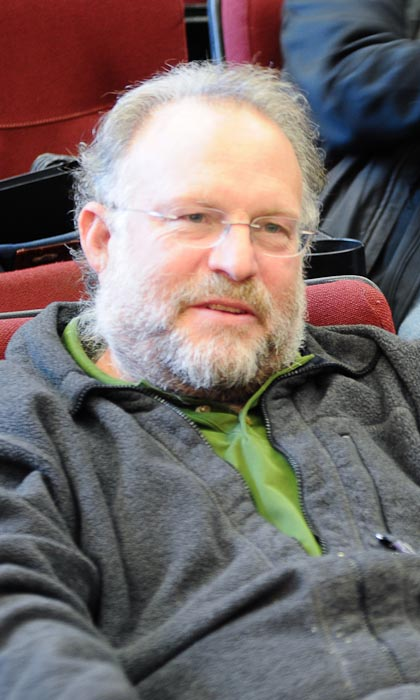
- Greenfield in 2010
- Born: March 14, 1951 (age 75); Brooklyn, New York, US
- Education: Oberlin College (1973)
- Occupation: Food company founder
- Known for: Co-founder of Ben & Jerry's with Ben Cohen
- Spouse: Elizabeth Skarie (m. 1987)
- Children: 1

Jerry Greenfield (born March 14, 1951) is an American businessman, philanthropist, and activist. He is a co-founder of Ben & Jerry's Homemade Holdings, Inc.

Greenfield grew up on Long Island. He attended Oberlin College, where he was a National Merit Scholar and followed a pre-med curriculum before graduating in 1973. He applied unsuccessfully for medical school before deciding to go into business with Ben Cohen, a childhood friend. After taking a course in ice-cream making from Penn State, Greenfield and Cohen opened their first ice cream store in downtown Burlington, Vermont. The company was sold to British-Dutch corporation Unilever in 2000. As of 2021 it had 573 stores and as of 2025 annual revenues of $1.28 billion.

== Early life ==
Jerry Greenfield grew up on Long Island, in a family of Jewish roots. He attended Merrick Avenue Junior High School, where he met Ben Cohen in 1963. Greenfield and Cohen both attended Calhoun High School and remained friends until they both graduated and left Long Island to attend college.

Greenfield chose to pursue a pre-med curriculum at Oberlin College, where he began working as an ice cream scooper in the school's cafeteria.

After graduating in 1973, Greenfield failed to get into medical school. At this point, Greenfield decided to move back to New York where he shared an apartment with Cohen and worked as a lab technician. In 1974, Greenfield was again rejected from medical school and decided to move to North Carolina with his future wife, Elizabeth Skarie, and continued to work as a lab technician.

Greenfield lived with Cohen in Saratoga Springs, New York during the summer of 1977. After initially considering opening a bagel shop, they chose to open an ice cream store. They took a five-dollar correspondence course in ice-cream making and opened their first store in a former gas station in Burlington, Vermont. Ben & Jerry's opened in the summer of 1978.

During the 1980s, Greenfield left the business to support Elizabeth in Arizona as she pursued a Ph.D. in psychology. The couple returned to Vermont in 1985, when Greenfield assumed the position of Director of Mobile Promotions.

== Ben & Jerry's ==
Greenfield and Cohen began looking for a proper location for their ice cream parlor in 1977. The criteria that they set down were that the location should be a college town, since they assumed college students ate a lot of ice cream, and that it should be warm. After comparing information from almanacs and a guide to American colleges, the pair realized that every warm college town already had an ice cream shop and settled on Burlington, Vermont in 1978, as the location for their shop.

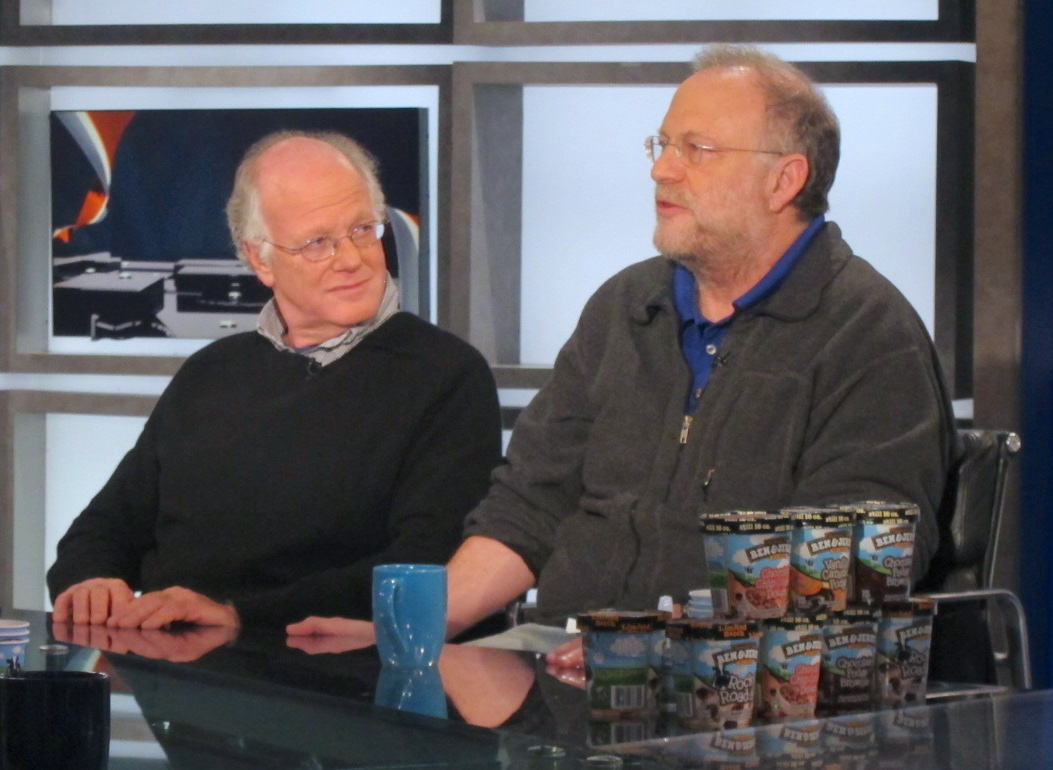
Greenfield (right) in 2012 with Ben Cohen

After choosing their town, the two businessmen needed to find a suitable building. They decided on an old gas station and began looking for financing. With a combined savings totaling around $8,000, Greenfield and Cohen began searching for a bank to lend them money. Repeatedly they found themselves rejected because the gas station could only be leased for one year at a time and it was judged unwise to invest large amounts of capital in such a venture. Finally they managed to receive a $4,000 loan and began renovating the station. On May 5, 1978, the parlor opened and throughout the summer experienced success, however, the pair struggled throughout the winter.

In 1980, after experiencing initial success in their attempts to distribute their ice cream to restaurants throughout Vermont, the company moved to a larger facility and began packaging ice cream in pint size containers. In 1984, Häagen-Dazs tried to limit distribution of Ben & Jerry's in Boston, prompting Ben & Jerry's to file suit against Häagen-Dazs' parent company, Pillsbury, in its now famous "What's the Doughboy Afraid Of?" campaign. In 1987 Häagen-Dazs again tried to enforce exclusive distribution, and Ben & Jerry's filed its second lawsuit against the Pillsbury Company.

In April 2000, Ben & Jerry's was bought by the multinational food giant Unilever. Greenfield and Cohen were involved in the company until September 16, 2025, when Ben Cohen posted a photo on his X account from Jerry stating he was stepping down from the company. Jerry stated that he "can no longer in good conscience, and after 47 years, remain an employee of Ben and Jerry's." This came after Greenfield's contention that Unilever was "silencing" the company's social mission, thus violating conditions of the merger agreement. The company replied, "We disagree with his perspective and have sought to engage both co-founders in a constructive conversation on how to strengthen Ben & Jerry's powerful values-based position in the world."

Cohen has not left the company.

== Political activism ==
On April 18, 2016, Greenfield and Cohen were arrested at a Democracy Awakening protest in Washington, D.C.

== Personal life ==
In 1987, Greenfield married Elizabeth Skarie and in 1988, they had a son, Tyrone. He resides in Williston, Vermont, a small town just outside Burlington.
