= Alex Rivera =

American film maker (born 1973)

- Born: 1973 (age 52–53); New York City, New York, US
- Occupation: Filmmaker
- Spouse: Cristina Ibarra

Alex Rivera (born 1973) is a Sundance award-winning American film maker and MacArthur Fellow, best known for his films about labor, immigration, and politics.

== Early life ==
Rivera was born in 1973 in New York City. His father is a Peruvian immigrant and his mother is an American citizen. Growing up as a bicultural youth in New York, he took an interest in the fields of film, digital media, and science fiction. He is well known for his film Sleep Dealer, which premiered in the 2008 Sundance Film Festival. He was awarded the Creative Capital Moving Image Award, Alfred P. Sloan Foundation Feature Film Prize and the Waldo Salt Screenwriting Award.

== Career ==
Rivera studied political science and media theory at Hampshire College, graduating in 1995. Due to his knowledge and background in cinematography, his work address concerns of the Latino community concentrating on political issues such as migration, race and gender. In addition, he uses language as a form of satire and humor to enhance the understanding Latinos contributions within various Anglo communities, much like the mockumentary A Day Without a Mexican. According to his website alexrivera.com, Rivera states that "over the past ten years he's been making work that illuminates two massive and parallel realities: the globalization of information through the internet, and the globalization of families, and communities, through mass migration."

Rivera, captures the process of migration and the social changes an immigrant faces in order to be considered a model United States citizen. The issues that are presented through his films impact the Latino communities because of the realism that is presented by characters in his films. They establish relationships with audiences, not only from the Latino community, but from all those who have experience dehumanization from their host countries. Rivera wants his viewers to understand that the "American Dream, is five minutes into the future, where the relationship between technology and a variety of political issues where it is precisely through a visualization of the dehumanization of migrants through technology that the film engages with their humanization."

Rivera has made films about labor, immigration, and politics since the 1990s. Some of his work has been viewed as mockumentaries and works that illustrate the transnational struggles of immigrants. Rivera's work reveals the transnational obstacles immigrants face in fighting for inclusion in the U.S. while providing for public development back in their hometowns. Rivera's films raise questions about "immigrant labor as a mobile commodity and the relationship of this commodity (and the bodies that perform it) to capital accumulation". Rivera's use of hometown associations in his films illustrates the use of transnational neighborhoods (also referred to as transnational barrios) as a source of organization. Rivera also illustrates how immigrants use the dollar from the U.S. to reverse U.S.’s exploitation of the immigrant's hometown. His films also critique how U.S. immigration policy dehumanizes immigrants for their labor, and critiques neoliberal economic globalization through futuristic examples. Rivera's most notable film for critiquing U.S. immigration policies through futuristic examples has been Sleep Dealer, which is described as a "sci-fi border saga." Rivera is said to use influences such as Star Wars and El Norte to express the struggles of immigrants. In an interview Rivera draws parallels to express the U.S. as the Galactic Empire and the victims of U.S.’s immigration and economic policies as the Rebel Forces.

== Awards and nominations ==
- 2021 MacArthur Fellowship

Sleep Dealer (2008)

- Sundance Film Festival - Waldo Salt Screenwriting Award & Alfred P. Sloan Award 2008
- Berlin International Film Festival - Amnesty International Award 2008
- Neuchatel International Fantasy Film Festival - Best of the Festival 2008
- Gotham Awards - Nominee Breakthrough Director 2008
- Independent Spirit Awards - Nominee Best First Feature 2008
- Creative Capital award 2000

The Sixth Section (2003)

- Guanajuato Film Festival - Best Documentary 2004
- UrbanWorld Film Festival - Best Documentary 2004

Why Cybraceros? (1997)

- Cine Festival - Best Experimental 1997

Papapá (1995)

- Chicago Intercom Competition - Silver Hugo 1995
- New York Expo of Short Film and Video - Silver Award 1995

== Filmography ==
=== Film ===
Year	Title	Director	Writer	Producer	Notes
1995	Papapapá	Yes	Yes	Yes	Short film
1997	Why Cybraceros?	Yes	Yes	Yes	Short film
2002	The Borders Trilogy	Yes	Yes	Yes	Short film
2003	The Sixth Section	Yes	Yes	Yes	Short film
2008	Sleep Dealer	Yes	Yes	No	Directorial Debut
2013	Aloe Blacc: Wake Me Up	Yes	No	No	Music Video
2013	El Hielo (ICE)	Yes	No	No	Music Video
2019	The Infiltrators	Yes	Yes	Yes	co-director: Cristina Ibarra
TBA	Zorro 2.0	Yes	Yes	No	Feature film
