= Democracy Spring =

US progressive social movement organization

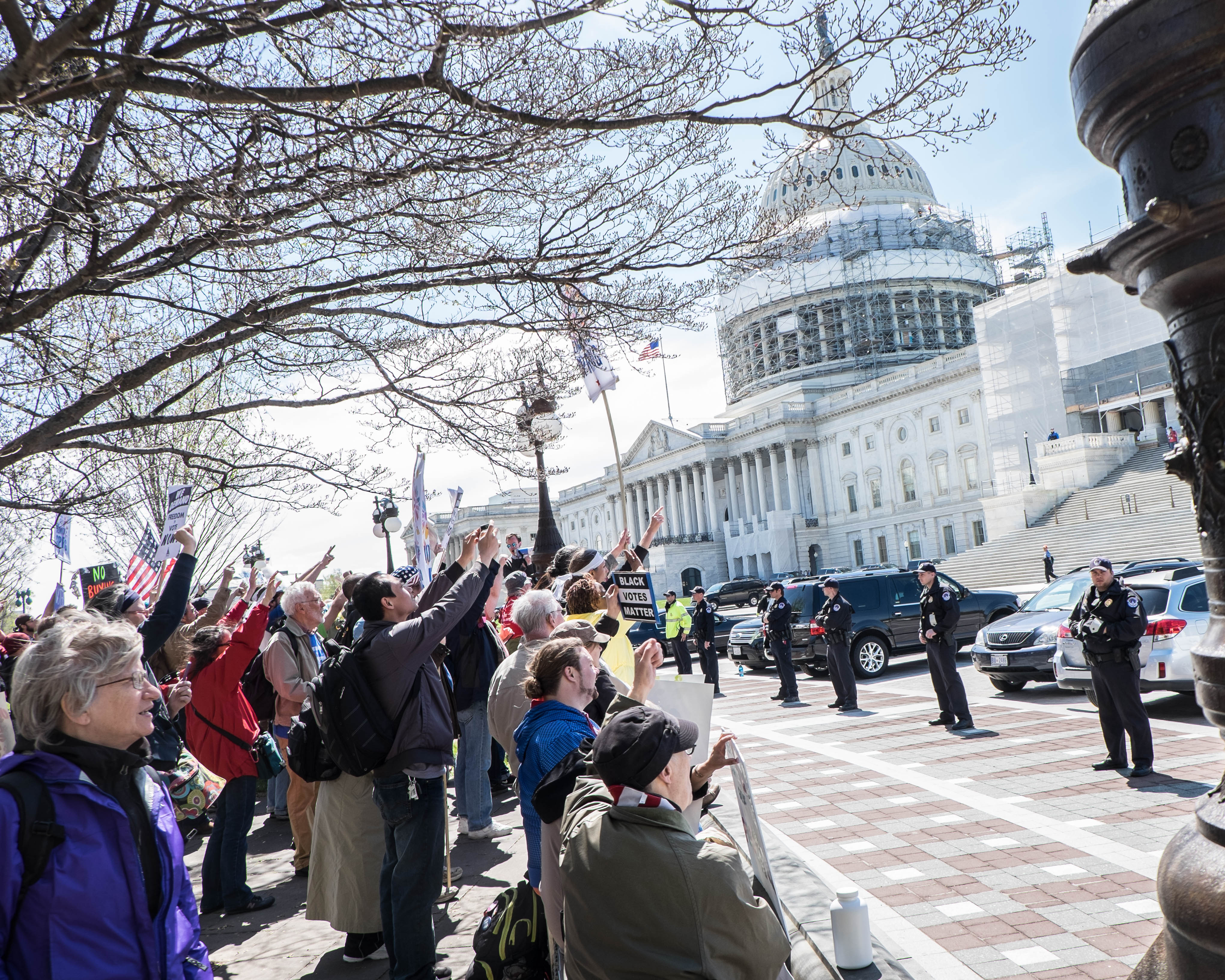
- Democracy Spring protesters at the United States Capitol building, April 2016
- Date: April 2016–Summer 2019
- Location: Washington, D.C.
- Goals: Electoral reform
- Methods: Civil resistance
- Status: Dissolved

Casualties
- Detained: 900–1,200

Democracy Spring was a progressive social movement organization based in the United States that used campaigns of escalating nonviolent civil disobedience to press for federal legislation reducing the influence of money in politics and expanding voting rights.

The organization began as a coalition of "more than 100 progressive groups" with a common interest in the enactment in the United States of federal legislation intended to reduce "the influence of money in politics" and "expand and protect voting rights." A ten-day non-violent protest march was held in April 2016 from Philadelphia to Washington, DC. Its demands included the passage of several bills such as those to improve voter rights and empowerment and require fair elections. During the course of the protest, 900 to 1,200 individuals were arrested.

The group disbanded in 2019.

== Leadership ==
The lead organizer was activist Kai Newkirk, who had previously co-founded the anti-Citizens United direct-action group 99Rise. The Democracy Spring coalition was announced in December 2015 via an open letter in The Nation.

== Actions ==
=== 140-mile march to U.S. Capitol and sit-ins ===
A group of Democracy Spring participants began a ten-day march from Philadelphia to Washington, DC on April 2, 2016. The initial events received widespread coverage on social media, and outlets like NPR and C-SPAN, while cable news networks devoted little time to the protests.

The protest began with a rally and participants included progressive political commentator Cenk Uygur, actress Rosario Dawson, educator and activist Lawrence Lessig, author Frances Moore Lappé, Chris Hedges, filmmaker Annabel Park, Ben & Jerry's founders, Ben Cohen and Jerry Greenfield, and "many attendees sporting Bernie Sanders clothing and signs." Demonstrators slept in local churches and at a tent set up near Union Station with a permit.

The first day of nonviolent protest during the April mobilization drew over 600 people to the United States Capitol building, where over 400 were peaceably arrested. The group demanded a "Congress of conscience" pass laws related to voter representation that would encourage small political contributions, constrain large and undisclosed political contributions, end gerrymandering, and reinstate mechanisms from the Voting Rights Act. The group also demanded a hearing for President Barack Obama's Merrick Garland Supreme Court nomination, which was postponed by the legislature. NPR found the event to be "cheery and peaceful" and a Capitol Police officer said that unless the protesters had outstanding warrants, they would "merely be processed, cited with a fine, and released."

Police arrested 85 activists on that second day, and organizers said it was the largest mass arrest at the Capitol building in history. The second protest held hundreds of participants, many of whom were elderly. More protests were planned daily throughout the week and over 3,500 people across 33 states pledged to participate. On the third day around 100 protesters were arrested. A dozen protesters were arrested inside the Capitol building's rotunda and 130 arrested outside on the fourth day. The dozen indoor protesters had zip tied themselves to scaffolding in an attempt to occupy the Capitol building. By Saturday, over 900 activists had been arrested in total over the week. The Independent Voter Project reported that by Monday over 1200 had been arrested in total.

Democracy Awakening, which is closely aligned with Democracy Spring, followed up Democracy Spring's April protest with a protest of their own in a similar fashion at the U.S. Capitol. Ben Cohen and Jerry Greenfield, Ben and Jerry's co founders, were among approximately 300 people arrested as part of the "Democracy Awakening" protests.

=== Democratic National Convention ===
In the lead up to the 2016 Democratic National Convention, the strategic leadership of Democracy Spring issued four demands to the Democratic National Committee. The demands were that the party commit, within the first 100 days of a new Congress and presidential administration, to reverse Citizens United v. FEC, ensure publicly funded elections, and restore the preclearance provisions Voting Rights Act, which were made effectively unenforceable by Shelby County v. Holder. The fourth demand, reflecting that the first three looked forward to January 2017, was that the Democratic Party immediately abolish the superdelegate system as a show of good faith. Democracy Spring promised civil disobedience outside the convention if the demands were not met.

Democracy Spring activists were barred from entry to the DNC's Rules Committee meeting where changes to the superdelegate system were being discussed. Activists claimed victory after the committee voted for a 2/3rds reduction in the role of superdelegates.

The first day of sit-ins outside the Democratic National Convention resulted in more than 50 arrests. On the third day of the convention, Democracy Spring staged another sit-in, this time inside the convention perimeter, by "diverting and distracting" police. This second action resulted in dozens more arrests.

== Demands ==
Democracy Spring's platform called for the passage of four pieces of federal legislation:

- Pass the Voting Rights Advancement Act (H. R. 2867, S. 1659)
- Pass the Voter Empowerment Act (H. R. 12)
- Pass the Democracy For All amendment (H. J. Res. 22, S. J. Res. 5)
- Pass the Government by the People & Fair Elections Now acts (H. R. 20 and S. 1538)

== Notable participants and endorsers ==
The following individuals attended at least part of the April 2016 mobilization:

- Rosario Dawson, actress
- Sam Waterston, actor
- Lawrence Lessig, educator and activist
- Gaby Hoffmann, actress
- Frances Moore Lappé, author
- Chris Hedges, author
- John Pudner, conservative political figure and founder of Take Back Our Republic
- Annabel Park, filmmaker
- Jodie Evans, political activist, author, and documentary film producer
- Umi Selah, co-founder and mission director of the Dream Defenders
- Ben Cohen, Ben & Jerry's co-founder
- Jerry Greenfield, Ben & Jerry's co-founder
- Cenk Uygur, political commentator
- Medea Benjamin, activist and author
- Joan Mandle, executive director of Democracy Matters
- Adam Eichen, author

The following individuals did not attend the April 2016 mobilization but offered an endorsement:

- Mark Ruffalo, actor
- Noam Chomsky, public intellectual
- Frances Fox Piven, public intellectual
- Zephyr Teachout, Law Professor and former candidate for Congress

== See also ==
- Progressivism in the United States
- Occupy Wall Street
- Civil resistance
- Nonviolent resistance
