= 99Rise =

American political organisation

99Rise is a progressive social movement organization founded in 2012, that aims to "reclaim our democracy from the domination of big money." According to their website, 99rise's 10 principles are: nonviolence, strategic unity, common message, decentralized structure, democratic cooperation, inclusion, pluralism, leadership as service, voluntarism, and open affiliation. 99rise is a decentralized organization with distributed leadership stretching across the United States. 99Rise puts activists and organizers through 2-day detailed DNA trainings, Online Basic Trainings, and monthly Online Orientations in order to equip each member with the tools needed to continue to spread their organization's message. Since the formation of the movement, 99rise members have garnered media attention by protesting during Supreme Court hearings and by interrupting Donald Trump at the 2016 GOP debate.

In 2017, 99Rise integrated with the group Democracy Spring.

== Strategy ==
99Rise plans on achieving their goal to reclaim democracy from the domination of big money through a five phase approach:

1. (By April 2016) Build the movement. 99Rise prepared each activist through encompassing trainings, team building exercises, and leadership meetings.
2. (April 2016 - September 2016) Participate in forms of civil disobedience to get the attention of political leadership during the 2016 election. For example, 99Rise disrupted the Supreme Court on April 1, 2015 and Donald Trump at the GOP debate.
3. (September 2016 - December 2016) Mobilize members to get out and elect representatives and a president who will be their champion for the causes they are fighting for.
4. (January 2017- December 2017) Hold Congress, the President, and state legislatures accountable when it comes to meeting their demands to reclaim democracy. If the governing bodies do not meet their demands for constitutional and legislative reform, then participate in forms of civil disobedience and/or mass noncooperation.
5. (January 2017 - November 2018) Monitor and enforce the reform agenda until it is enacted. Further escalation of civil disobedience if necessary.

== Leadership ==
Kai Newkirk is the co-founder of 99Rise. While Newkirk understood the difficulties of 99rise's mission, he stressed that there are important smaller victories that can be achieved to restore some integrity back into the political process. Newkirk wanted to push for the adoption of disclosure laws to address the problem of dark money and wants to create a democracy voucher system which would give a tax credit to voters to let every voter direct $50 or $100 to a candidate of their choosing. He believed that these two victories would be a step in the right direction towards achieving their ultimate goal of reclaiming democracy from the power of big money.

== Actions ==
=== Supreme Court Hearing Protests ===
==== Jan 21, 2015 ====
A group of seven 99rise activists protested during a Supreme Court Hearing. They chose this day to disrupt the court because they were condemning the ruling in the Citizens United case which happened five years ago from this day. In a report following the incident, 99Rise members also noted that a Princeton study concluded the average American had "near-zero, statistically non-significant impact upon public policy." They rationalized that there disturbance of the court was one way they could make an impact, or draw attention towards public policy that they find unjust. Immediately following the disruption, the activists were escorted out of the courtroom and were charged with making a harangue or oration. The individuals charged were Andrew Batcher, Irandira Gonzales, Margaret Johnson, Alexandra Flores-Quilty, Katherine Philipson, Curt Ries, and Mary Zeiser. The 8th member in the courtroom, Ryan Clayton, allegedly used a concealed camera to film the incident. It is still unclear as to what penalty Clayton will receive.

==== April 1, 2015 ====
A group of five 99rise activists protested during another Supreme Court hearing. The 99rise members stood up and said, "We rise to demand democracy. One person, one vote". Immediately after, they were tackled and arrested. They now face two charges: picketing with the intent of interfering with or obstructing the administration of justice and making a harangue or oration. The date that they protested, April 1, 2015, is also of significance because it is the one year anniversary of the McCutcheon vs FEC Supreme Court ruling. The ruling "struck down the aggregate limits on the amount an individual may contribute during a two-year period to all federal candidates, parties and political action committees combine." 99rise contends that this ruling gave the 1% even more power to control our democracy through political donations by getting rid of the previously held restriction of $123,400 that one may contribute to a candidate, PACs, or parties.

=== GOP debate interruption ===
During the 2016 GOP debate, Kai Newkirk, one of the cofounders of 99rise, stood up and interrupted Donald Trump. While there are conflicting reports as to what Newkirk said, sources claim he spoke out for fair elections rather than billionaire controlled ones. He was immediately removed from the venue following the disruption.

=== March for Democracy Across California ===
On May 17, 2014, members of 99rise began their 480-mile journey from LA City Hall to the State Capital in Sacramento, California. The march called for three tangible changes to legislation:

1. Pass an amendment that stops big money influence on the American political system.
2. Pass Senate Bill 1272 (SB1272) - Allow California voters the chance to collaborate and propose such an amendment as stated above, and the California legislature to ratify it by passing a Senate bill.
3. Pass the Disclose Act - Stop anonymous money in elections.
