= Ben Cohen (businessman) =

American businessman (born 1951)

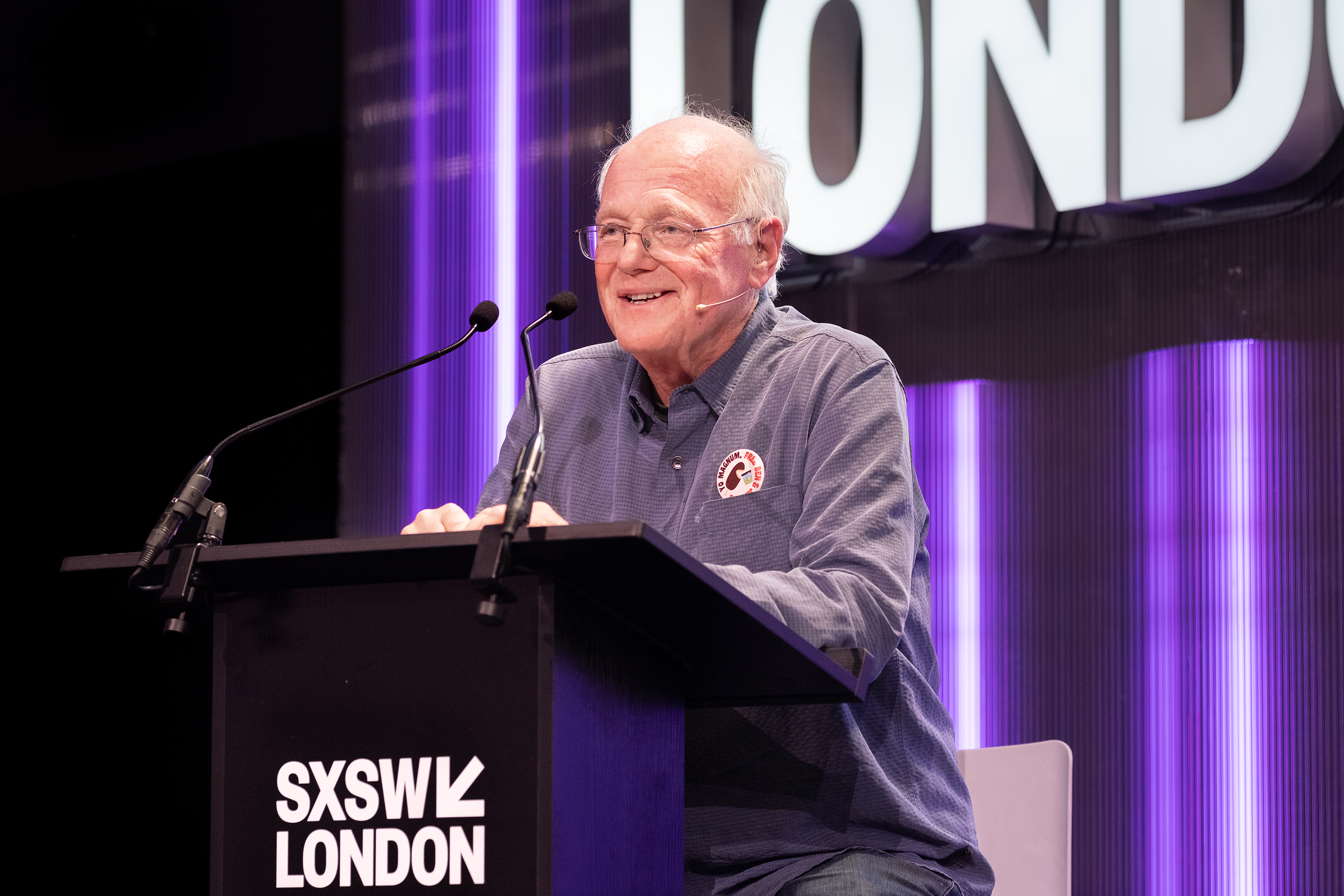
- Ben Cohen at SXSW London 2026
- Born: Bennett Cohen; March 18, 1951 (age 75); New York City, U.S.
- Occupation: Food company founder
- Known for: Co-founder with Jerry Greenfield of Ben & Jerry's, former company CEO

Bennett Cohen (born March 18, 1951) is an American entrepreneur, activist and philanthropist. He is a co-founder of the ice cream company Ben & Jerry's and a prominent supporter of progressive causes.

== Early life and education ==
Cohen was born in Brooklyn, New York, and raised in the town of Merrick, New York, on Long Island by Jewish parents Frances and Irving. He spent at least one summer at Buck's Rock Performing and Creative Arts Camp in New Milford, Connecticut. Cohen first met and befriended his future business partner Jerry Greenfield in a seventh grade gym class in 1963. They continued on to Sanford H. Calhoun High School. In his senior year, Cohen found work as an ice cream man before leaving for university studies.

He studied at Colgate University in Hamilton, New York; Skidmore College in Saratoga Springs, New York, where he mostly took pottery classes; New York University in New York, New York; and at the University Without Walls program of the University of Massachusetts in Amherst, Massachusetts. Over the next decade, Cohen pursued his interest in pottery and dropped out of college after his sophomore year.

== Career ==
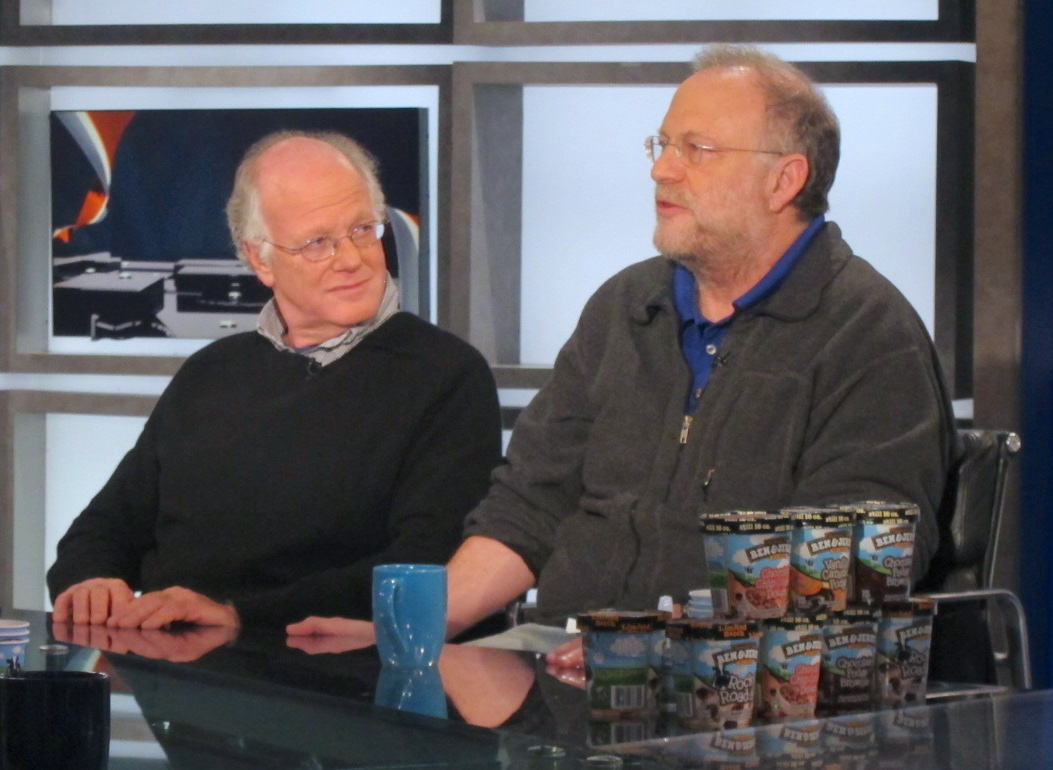
Cohen in 2012 with business partner Jerry Greenfield

=== Ben & Jerry's ===
In 1977, Cohen decided to go into business with his old friend Jerry Greenfield, and in May of the next year, the two men opened Ben & Jerry's Homemade Ice Cream Parlor in Burlington, Vermont. They initially intended to start a bagel business, but found the equipment costs prohibitive and switched to ice cream instead. They chose Burlington as a location because it was a prominent college town which, at the time, had no ice cream shop. Ben & Jerry's distinctive style of ice cream was developed to compensate for Cohen's anosmia, as he kept adding larger and larger chunks to the ice cream to satisfy his need for texture in food.

In 1996, Cohen resigned as chief executive of Ben & Jerry's. Cohen and Greenfield sold the company to Unilever in 2000.

In 2025, Unilever announced it would spin off Ben & Jerry's to a new entity, The Magnum Ice Cream Company (TMICC). After the spin-off, the new company announced board changes. Cohen and Greenfield pushed back on the new owners for manipulating board seats and fighting the company's long-held values. In January 2026, independent board members filed a lawsuit against Magnum. Cohen wants the company sold to socially responsible investors, which Magnum has refused.

=== Other business ventures ===
In March 2023, it was reported Cohen started Ben's Best Blnz, or B3, a non-profit firm that offered cannabis products like low-THC pre-rolls and full-spectrum vapes. The stated objective of this effort was to correct for the wrongs of the war on drugs and to narrow the racial wealth gap. Proceeds from sales would be split among three entities, with 10 per cent going to the Last Prisoner Project, 10 per cent going to the Vermont Racial Justice Alliance, and the remaining 80 per cent going to NuProject.

== Political activism ==
Cohen presenting handmade cookie display on US military expenditure at 2026 American Economic Association Meeting

As Ben & Jerry's gradually grew into a nationwide business and one of the largest ice cream companies in the U.S., Cohen turned his new-found wealth and prominence toward a variety of political causes, generally through the Ben & Jerry's Foundation. The Foundation receives 7.5 per cent of all Ben & Jerry's pre-tax profits and distributes funds to organizations such as the Anti Displacement Project. Cohen also oversaw TrueMajority and Business Leaders for Sensible Priorities.

He supported Dennis Kucinich in the 2004 Democratic Party presidential primaries. In 2008, he initially supported John Edwards followed by Barack Obama.

In 2012, he helped launch the Stamp Stampede campaign to stamp messages on the nation's currency in support of passing a constitutional amendment to help overturn Citizens United v. Federal Election Commission and reduce the influence of private corporations on politics.

Cohen speaking at Bernie Sanders' presidential rally at Navy Pier Illinois, March 2019

On April 18, 2016, Cohen was arrested, with Jerry Greenfield, while at a Democracy Awakening protest in Washington, D.C.

In July 2021, Ben & Jerry's independent board announced in 2021 it would stop selling its products in occupied Palestinian territory, citing social values. Unilever, the parent company, disagreed and faced pressure from the Israeli government and other groups. To avoid conflict and continue Ben & Jerry's sales in the region, Unilever sold the brand's Israel business to Avi Zinger, the local licensee who had previously challenged the boycott. The agreement allowed Zinger to continue selling Ben & Jerry's products under its Hebrew and Arabic names, while Unilever's other brands continue to operate in Israel. In an opinion piece in the New York Times Cohen and Greenfield wrote "it’s possible to support Israel and oppose some of its policies".

In 2022, Cohen funded the Pierre Sprey Award for journalism. The inaugural awardees included Sam Husseini, Aaron Maté, Benjamin Abelow, and Sudarsan Raghavan.

In 2023 Cohen faced criticism over his opposition to U.S. weapons deliveries to Ukraine in its war against Russia, with some calling for boycotts against Ben & Jerry's. Cohen said: “The U.S. could use its power to advocate for a negotiated settlement, but instead it’s using its power to prolong the war — prolong and prolong and increase the death and destruction”.

Cohen is a top donor to the People's Power Initiative and Eisenhower Media Network, organizations that have argued against U.S. military and financial assistance to Ukraine. Speakers for the Eisenhower Media Network have been accused by the Daily Beast of echoing Russian talking points on Ukraine, including blaming NATO expansion for the outbreak of the conflict. Cohen told the Daily Beast that "the U.S. should use its power to negotiate an end to the war, not prolong the death and destruction by supplying more weapons".

In 2022, Ben & Jerry's parent company, Unilever, criticized a tweet from Ben & Jerry's Twitter account blaming U.S. President Joe Biden for contributing to rising tensions with Russia and distanced itself from Ben & Jerry's position on Ukraine.

Cohen was arrested in July 2023 during a protest against the U.S. government's prosecution of WikiLeaks publisher Julian Assange.

In March 2024, Cohen was one of several signatories of "A Statement From Jewish Americans Opposing AIPAC", a letter denouncing AIPAC's lobbying efforts in the United States government.

Cohen reiterated his opposition to U.S. involvement in Ukraine and criticized the size of the Pentagon’s budget on Tucker Carlson's talk show in May 2025. He stated that the U.S. was the world’s largest arms exporter and had the largest military in the world, which "support[s] the slaughter of people in Gaza, [and] if somebody protests the slaughter of people in Gaza, we arrest them". He also promoted a website to back the Department of Government Efficiency, an initiative by the second Trump administration tasked with cutting federal spending.

In 2025 Cohen announced via his personal Instagram that he would be creating a watermelon sorbet themed flavor which resembled the Palestinian flag and promoted peace in the country. Unilever blocked this choice which led to Cohen selling it under his independent Ben's Best ice cream brand.

=== Bernie Sanders presidential campaigns ===
Cohen became a prominent supporter of and donor to Bernie Sanders during the 2016 Democratic Party presidential primaries.

Cohen debuted a special ice cream flavor called "Bernie's Yearning" on January 25, 2016 in support of Sanders. The flavor, released under the brand Ben's Best, consisted of plain mint ice cream covered by a solid layer of mint chocolate. According to Cohen, "The chocolate disk represents the huge majority of economic gains that have gone to the top 1 percent since the end of the recession. Beneath it, the rest of us." This was done in an effort to showcase the United States' current socioeconomic issues. The ice cream was made by hand in Cohen's kitchen with ingredients purchased by the Sanders campaign. Ben & Jerry's released a statement disavowing connection or support for the product, saying "This was created by Ben as a citizen. The company is not involved.”

On February 21, 2019, Cohen was named a national co-chair of Bernie Sanders' 2020 campaign. In August 2019, Cohen produced another Bernie Sanders flavor called "Bernie's Back." It was not for sale in stores, but was awarded as a prize to 40 contest winners.

=== Arrest during Senate hearing ===
In May 2025, Cohen was again arrested for interrupting a United States Senate hearing at which Robert F. Kennedy Jr. was giving testimony. Cohen was protesting against US support for Israel’s war in Gaza, yelling, "Congress kills poor kids in Gaza by buying bombs and pays for it by kicking kids off Medicaid in the U.S." as he was dragged out by police. He was charged with a misdemeanor.

== Awards ==
- Cohen was a US Small Business Person of the Year in 1988.
- Cohen was honored by the New York Open Center in 2000 for his "leadership in pioneering socially responsible business."
