= Decadence (album) =

Studio album by Head Automatica
- Released: August 17, 2004
- Recorded: September–October 2003
- Studio: The Glue Factory, San Francisco, California
- Genre: Dance-rock; garage rock; electronic rock
- Length: 37:45
- Label: Warner Bros.
- Producer: Dan the Automator; Howard Benson

Head Automatica chronology
Decadence (2004)	Popaganda (2006)

Singles from Decadence
- 1. "Beating Heart Baby" Released: January 31, 2005

Decadence is the debut studio album of American rock band Head Automatica that was released on August 17, 2004, through Warner Bros. Records. Vocalist Daryl Palumbo toured as a member of Glassjaw until early 2003, when he wrote material for a new band. Shortly afterwards, he formed Head Automatica with drummer Larry Gorman and producer Dan "Dan the Automator" Nakamura. Recording sessions for their debut were held in September and October 2003 at The Glue Factory in San Francisco, California, with Nakamura producing the majority of the songs and Howard Benson producing two of them. Decadence is a dance-rock, garage rock, and electronic rock album that was influenced by the works of Joe Jackson, Nick Lowe, and Primal Scream.

Decadence received mixed reviews from critics, some of whom complimented the songwriting while others said fewer than half of the songs were of good quality. The album peaked at number 125 on the UK Albums Chart. Before the album's release, Head Automatica toured the United States with Thursday, appeared on the Honda Civic Tour, and traveled with the Curiosa Festival. The band then promoted the album with a US West Coast tour and supported the Used on their US tour. Palumbo became ill with Crohn's disease, leading the cancellation of tours from late 2004 to mid-2005. "Beating Heart Baby" was released as the album's lead single in January 2005.

== Background and development ==
Since 1993, vocalist Daryl Palumbo has been a member of Glassjaw, who released two albums; Everything You Ever Wanted to Know About Silence (2000) and Worship and Tribute (2002). Promotion for Worship and Tribute continued into 2003, when Glassjaw embarked on the SnoCore Tour in February and March. Around this time, MTV reported Palumbo and the Movielife frontman Vinnie Caruana had written several songs together for a band referred to as H.A. Some live performances with Glassjaw were halted when Palumbo had a relapse of Crohn's disease in April 2003, resulting in the cancellation of a tour of the United Kingdom.

Palumbo formed Head Automatica with fellow Glassjaw drummer Larry Gorman, who was interested in Palumbo's desire to make different music. Palumbo met producer Dan "Dan the Automator" Nakamura through some friends, who then joined the band. The new act allowed Palumbo to work on material that was "dark and futuristic, with a blend of garage and dance", which did not fit the sound of Glassjaw. Dan the Automator had worked with Eels and Primal Scream, and had earlier been a member of Handsome Boy Modeling School. Between June and August 2003, Glassjaw appeared on the Warped Tour and played their final show prior to a hiatus. By this point, 19 songs had been recorded for Head Automatica.

== Recording ==
Recording sessions for Decadence occurred between September and October 2003; during this time, Dan the Automator had been working on second albums for Handsome Boy Modeling School and Gorillaz. Dan the Automator produced almost every track, except for "Beating Heart Baby" and "The Razor". The Automator-produced songs were recorded at The Glue Factory in San Francisco, California. Mike Plotnikoff acted as engineer for "Beating Heart Baby", "The Razor", and "Dance Party Plus"; Benson and Craig Aaronson did additional production on "Dance Party Plus". Palumbo had some heavy-sounding songs spare; he recorded "Beating Heart Baby" and "The Razor" with producer Howard Benson, who was known for his work with Cold and P.O.D., two months later.

Mixing was split between four people: Dave Sardy mixed "At the Speed of a Yellow Bullet", "Brooklyn Is Burning", "King Caesar", "Disco Hades II", "Solid Gold Telephone", and "I Shot William H. Macy"; Benson mixed "Beating Heart Baby", "The Razor", and "Dance Party Plus"; Rich Costey mixed "Please Please Please (Young Hollywood)"; and Automator mixed "Head Automatica Soundsystem". In a 2006 interview, Palumbo said Dan the Automator "didn't do too much" on the album, saying they bought some beats from him and he did some engineering across the release. Palumbo called Automator "limiting" and said; "I don't want to limit what I can do to what he's capable of ... I don't want to work with someone who doesn't understand me".

== Composition and lyrics ==
The sound of Decadence has been described as dance-rock, garage rock, and electronic rock. AllMusic reviewer Johnny Loftus wrote the album's sound blends elements of "furiously en vogue dance-punk, assemblist modern rock, and bits and pieces of the Def Jux crew's underground aesthetic". Drowned in Sound writer Michael Diver said the album's best comparison is to Diamonds and Pearls (1991) by Prince; according to Diver, "The low-slung funk and sleaze-pop that permeates this album would sit pretty with the Purple one". Palumbo cited the works of Joe Jackson, Nick Lowe, My Bloody Valentine, Primal Scream, and Squeeze as inspiration for the album. He said it has a "serious 1978 stamp on it" and that more than half of his music collection consisted of albums from the period 1978 to 1981. Dan the Automator said the band wanted to continue the sound Big Audio Dynamite might have made "if they were coming out today, or some of the Clash, but more, like, with the combination of the hard drums, hard guitars and the electronic elements".

Palumbo chose the album's title as a reference to self-indulgence and the glamor he had avoided up to that point in his career; he said, "A decadent lifestyle feels good" but it can take a "toll on you, but it's nice sometimes to have everything feel flashy and larger than life". Palumbo said he had written around 60% of the album beforehand but Dan the Automator is listed as a co-writer on the songs "At the Speed of a Yellow Bullet", "Brooklyn Is Burning", "Please Please Please (Young Hollywood)", "King Caesar", "Disco Hades II", and "Head Automatica Soundsystem". Palumbo said he had gotten "some beats and some production from Automator. I needed to have him fill in that gap by putting a lot of faith in his beats". Palumbo co-wrote "Beating Heart Baby" with guitarist Craig Bonich; and "Dance Party Plus" with Tim Armstrong from Rancid and Dave Rhodes. Palumbo solely wrote "The Razor", "Solid Gold Telephone", and "I Shot William H. Macy". Dan the Automator programmed for every track except "Beating Heart Baby" and "The Razor". Armstrong contributed additional vocals to "Dance Party Plus".

The album's opening song "At the Speed of a Yellow Bullet" includes a line from "Trouble Every Day" (1966) by the Mothers of Invention. Loftus said "Brooklyn Is Burning" "cuts bumpy dollar store disco" against a "crackling sample" in the vein of "Da Ya Think I'm Sexy?" (1978) by Rod Stewart. The Boston Phoenix writer Jeff Miller said "Beating Heart Baby" sounds like "At the Drive-In" "pumped through a postmodern-disco sound system". It starts akin to the sound of The Sweet before shifting into The Good Life territory. "Please Please Please (Young Hollywood)" recalls the work of Duran Duran and with its lyrics, which compare living in Hollywood to living a life of lust, Palumbo evokes Nine Inch Nails' frontman Trent Reznor. Both "King Caesar" and "Disco Hades II" take influences from 1990s dance music; Palumbo said the band were excessively listening to British music. "The Razor" is reminiscent of works of Glassjaw and Taking Back Sunday. "Dance Party Plus" starts with a hard-rock intro that switches to power chords over a reggae backdrop. "Head Automatica Soundsystem" is a rap rock song. The album's closing track "I Shot William H. Macy" sounds like a mixture of EMF and Gang of Four, and concludes with a telephone call from rapper Cage.

== Release ==
In July 2003, the existence of Head Automatica was made public and "At the Speed of a Yellow Bullet" was posted online. Warner Bros. Records, which had released Worship and Tribute, had first choice for the album. Palumbo was surprised by the label's enthusiasm for the music; he was expecting to release material through an independent label and was in discussion with two of them. In February 2004, Spin reported the album would be titled Tokyo Decadence and released the following month, by which time the band's lineup had expanded to seven members. In March 2004, Head Automatica went on a short tour with Thursday. "Dance Party Plus", "Please Please Please (Young Hollywood)", and "Beating Heart Baby" were made available for streaming on June 7, 2004. On June 24 that year, Decadence was announced for release in two months' time. Around this time, the band performed several dates on the Honda Civic Tour and supported The Cure as part of the Curiosa Festival in July and August 2004; between some of these performances, the band played headlining shows.

On August 6, 2004, a music video for "Beating Heart Baby" was posted online. It had been filmed during their performance at CBGB in New York earlier that month. Decadence was released on August 17, 2004; its UK release occurred a week later. For the artwork, Palumbo employed his friend Jane Marledge of Bantho Designs. The album was promoted with a West Coast US tour with Vaux, Hopesfall and Arkham the following month. In October and November 2004, the band supported the Used on their headlining tour of the US. Following this, the band were due to support Lostprophets on their UK tour and play a headlining show in London but these engagements were canceled due to Palumbo's Crohn's disease. At the end of the year, Palumbo had surgery related to Crohn's disease. The band also had to cancel their support slot on the Used's UK tour in early 2005 because Palumbo was again hospitalized with Crohn's disease shortly after landing. Another headlining performance was also canceled. Palumbo was initially treated in a London facility and continued his recovery in New York City.

"Beating Heart Baby" was released as the lead single from Decadence in the UK on January 31, 2005, alongside a reissue of the album. "Beating Heart Baby" was released to US radio on February 22, 2005. The band were due to support Sugarcult on the US Take Action Tour but due to Palumbo being hospitalized, they were replaced by Hopesfall. In May and June 2005, Head Automatica toured the US with Acceptance, Vendetta Red, and Nightmare of You. Following this, they went on a week-long tour with Caruana's other band I Am the Avalanche as support, and performed further dates through to the end of the month. During this period, the music video for "Please Please Please (Young Hollywood)" was posted online. Another video was made for "Beating Heart Baby"; it was posted online on July 19, 2005. Around this time, further shows with I Am the Avalanche were canceled because of Palumbo's Chron's disease, which left him hospitalized. They toured with theStart and then supported Finch until August 2005. On August 7, 2005, the band had to cancel the remainder of the dates with Finch due to Palumbo's Crohn's disease flaring up.

== Reception ==
Professional ratings
Review scores
Source	Rating
AllMusic	2.5/5 stars
The Boston Phoenix	2.5/5 stars
Drowned in Sound	4/5 stars
Melodic	2.5/5 stars
Ox-Fanzine	6/10
Rolling Stone	3/5 stars
Ultimate Guitar	10/10

Decadence was met with mixed reviews from music critics. Diver said the album provides "track after track of dancefloor delights that should have disco doyens and emo kids smiling gleefully in tandem" and that it "fully deserves its title, and is well worth your attention". According to Rolling Stone reviewer Kirk Miller, Palumbo's "violent frown" and "veiled threats come off more like an invitation than a warning" compared to his earlier work with Glassjaw. Miller praised the "retrofunky grooves" for being "slinky, sexy and very now. They also prove a point: Sometimes, angry white boys just gotta dance". Thea Cooke of mxdwn.com held a similar sentiment, stating Palumbo "replaced his angst-ridden vengeful sound with catchy, poppy hooks", showing he has "singing talent, even if it is just as a cock-rocker". She summarized the album is "fast, slightly furious, and in line with the whole 'retro to be contemporary' feel". The staff at Ultimate Guitar considered the album a "portion of fresh air" among the mainstream pop-punk scene, complimenting the band as they fused Dan the Automator's "dance beats and squiggles and Palumbo's inclination for angry rock sound". They said the lyrics are "interesting and unobtrusive and can easily make you think and laugh at the same time".

Jeff Vrabel of Billboard said the album has "a fuzzy, R&B-inflected club sound that really doesn't sound like anything else out there right now", though "other portions come off limp and awkward" because Palumbo appears as a "self-conscious aging popster". Melodic reviewer Kaj Roth wrote "the level of the songs goes up and down" but there is "something for everyone on it". Manuel Möglich of Ox-Fanzine said "even after repeated runs through the eleven tracks, the spark that Decadence is a really big album doesn't really want to jump over" and that only "half of all tracks are successful". According to Soundthesirens founder Billy Ho, Decadence is a "step in a new direction" but it "still doesn’t change the fact that Mr. Palumbo’s voice meanders from extremely irritating to mildly nauseating". He added the album is "just no fun at all. It's more like a sausage fest without the beer to inebriate the mood". Loftus said the mix of sounds on the album is not "100 percent consistent, and occasionally skates right past irony and straight into empty-headed pomposity. But in its best moments, Decadence is a dizzy paint shaker, as garish and morally bankrupt as you want your art sleaze to be." Jeff Miller wrote while the opening three tracks are "as close to perfect as anything that’s come out of the current dance-punk revival", the remainder "pales in comparison".

Decadence reached number 125 on the UK Albums Chart. Alternative Press ranked "Beating Heart Baby" at number 17 on their list of the best 100 singles of the 2000s. In 2019, Marianne Eloise of Kerrang! wrote following the album's release, "artists like Fall Out Boy and their protégés played with dance, rock and pop in a way that didn't sound like Head Automatica, but may have been made possible by it". According to Eloise, Sonny Moore of From First to Last "transitioned from screamo to EDM as Skrillex, and more recently Lil Peep rose to prominence releasing emo rap on SoundCloud". In 2022, Laura Marie Braun of Spin said "Beating Heart Baby" became an "instant crossover classic for scenesters and emo kids alike".

== Track listing ==
All songs written by Daryl Palumbo and Dan Nakamura, except where noted.

No.	Title	Writer(s)	Producer	Length
1.	"At the Speed of a Yellow Bullet"		Dan the Automator	2:14
2.	"Brooklyn Is Burning"		Dan the Automator	3:54
3.	"Beating Heart Baby"	Palumbo; Craig Bonich	Howard Benson	3:23
4.	"Please Please Please (Young Hollywood)"		Dan the Automator	4:08
5.	"King Caesar"		Dan the Automator	3:54
6.	"The Razor"	Palumbo	Benson	3:30
7.	"Dance Party Plus"	Palumbo; Tim Armstrong; Dave Rhodes	Dan the Automator; Benson (add.); Craig Aaronson (add.)	3:21
8.	"Disco Hades II"		Dan the Automator	3:57
9.	"Solid Gold Telephone"	Palumbo	Dan the Automator	2:23
10.	"Head Automatica Soundsystem"		Dan the Automator	3:35
11.	"I Shot William H. Macy"	Palumbo	Dan the Automator	3:17

== Personnel ==
Personnel per booklet.

Head Automatica

- Daryl Palumbo – vocals, guitar
- Larry Gorman – drums
- Brandon Arnovick – guitar
- Jim Greer – keyboards
- Jarvis Morgan Holden – bass
- Craig Bonich – guitar

Additional musicians

- Dan the Automator – programming (all except tracks 3 and 6)
- Tim Armstrong – additional vocals (track 7)
- Cage – phone call (track 11)

Production and design

- Dan the Automator – producer (all except tracks 3 and 6), mixing (track 10)
- Dave Sardy – mixing (tracks 1, 2, 5, 8, 9 and 11)
- Howard Benson – producer (tracks 3 and 6), mixing (tracks 3, 6 and 7), additional production (track 7)
- Mike Plotnikoff – engineer (tracks 3, 6 and 7)
- Rich Costey – mixing (track 4)
- Craig Aaronson – additional production (track 7)
- Jane Marledge – art direction, design
- Xevi Muntane – photography

== Charts ==
Chart performance for Decadence
Chart (2004)	Peak position
UK Albums Chart (OCC)	125
