= Nightmare of You (album) =

Studio album by Nightmare of You
- Released: September 13, 2005
- Recorded: January–March 2005
- Studio: The Fiction Factory, Koreatown, Los Angeles; Platinum Audio, Malibu, California; King Noise Recording, Malibu, California; One East Recording, New York City
- Genre: Indie pop, pop rock
- Length: 40:05
- Label: The Bevonshire Label
- Producer: Jason Lader

Nightmare of You chronology
Nightmare of You (2005)	Infomaniac (2009)

Singles from Nightmare of You
- 1. "My Name Is Trouble" Released: July 13, 2005; 2. "The Days Go by Oh So Slow" Released: March 6, 2006; 3. "My Name Is Trouble"/"Dear Scene, I Wish I Were Deaf" Released: February 19, 2007

Nightmare of You is the debut studio album by American rock band Nightmare of You.

== Background and production ==
The Movielife broke up in September 2003; guitarist Brandon Reilly formed Nightmare of You the following month, with the intention of making more pop-oriented music. As news was being spread that Reilly had started a new band, several demos (with Hot Rod Circuit drummer Mike Poorman) were posted online in January 2004. By this point, the band consisted of him and guitarist Joe McCaffery; they had written 15 songs. The following month, former Movielife bassist Phil Navetta had joined the band; drummer Sammy Siegler would be added sometime after. In June 2004, the band toured the east coast with My Chemical Romance, Boys Night Out, and Driveby. In January 2005, Navetta left the band, leaving them as a three-piece. Following this, the band flew to Los Angeles to begin work on their debut album. They accumulated 25 songs, which they cutdown to 16, and in preparation for recording, the band did 10 days of pre-production.

Nightmare of You was recorded at The Fiction Factory in Koreatown, Los Angeles, Platinum Audio and King Noise Recording Studios in Malibu, California, and One East Recording in New York City, with producer and engineer Jason Lader; Chris Avadon engineered "In the Bathroom Is Where I Want You" and "Heaven Runs on Oil". As the band had no bassist, Lader record bass for the album. Sessions lasted between January 25 and March 13, 2005; McCaffrey and Siegler returned home a week before Reilly did as he was finishing up vocals. Mixing sessions were spread across Skip Saylor in Larchmont, Henson in Hollywood, The Fiction Factory, and Pie Studio on Long Island. Lader mixed "Dear Scene, I Wish I Were Deaf", "Ode to Serotonin", "Marry Me", and "The Studded Cinctures". Greg Collins mixed "The Days Go by Oh So Slow", "Thumbelina", "My Name Is Trouble", "Why Am I Always Right?", and "I Want to Be Buried in Your Backyard"; Perry Margouleff mixed "In the Bathroom Is Where I Want You" and "Heaven Runs on Oil".

== Composition ==
Musically, the sound of Nightmare of You has been described as indie pop, and pop rock, with Reilly's vocals drawing comparisons to Alkaline Trio frontman Matt Skiba, and Billy Joel. Lader played bass on nearly every track, except for "Thumbelina" and "Heaven Runs on Oil", which were done by Joe Cairnes. Adam MacDougal adds keyboards and piano to every song, save for "My Name Is Trouble", "I Want to Be Buried in Your Backyard", and "In the Bathroom Is Where I Want You", and occasionally provided vocal harmonies. Lader contributed brass, mellotron, and keys on "Thumbelina" and "My Name Is Trouble". Stephanie Eital of Agent Sparks sun backup vocals on "The Days Go by Oh So Slow" and "Thumbelina".

The opening track "The Days Go by Oh So Slow" sets the tone of the album with its upbeat tempo and melodic nature showcasing Reilly's vocals. It comes across as a mix between Aztec Camera and the Smiths' frontman Morrissey. "Dear Scene, I Wish I Were Deaf" details acts that perform without having any meaningful topics to their songs. "Thumbelina" features lap steel guitar from Ben Peeler of the Mavericks, and details sexual deviance, and being young. "My Name Is Trouble" is dance song that blends Euro disco and millennial pop. "I Want to Be Buried in Your Backyard" is a mid-tempo song, and was previously named "Yuengling" after the drink of the same name. It features acoustic guitarwork from Joel Shearer of Pedestrian, and background vocals from Chantal Kreviazuk. Reilly said it was about being obsessed with a person and viewing them from a distance, while they did not harbor the same emotion. The outro horns, played by Dengue Fever member David Ralicke, in "Ode to Serotonin" recalled the work of the Decemberists. The country-indebted "Marry Me", which sees the addition of pedal steel guitar from Peeler, is followed by "In the Bathroom Is Where I Want You", which opens with an 1980s keyboard part.

== Release ==
On February 12, 2005, while in the midst of recording, demos of "Dear Scene, I Wish I Was Deaf", "Why Am I Always Right" and "I Want to Be Buried in Your Backyard" were posted on Nightmare of You's PureVolume account. On March 25, 2005, Ryan Heil joined the band on bass. Following this, the band embarked on an East Coast tour of the US, and appeared at The Bamboozle festival. On May 30, 2005, the band's debut album was announced for release in September. In June 2005, the band toured the US with Head Automatica. On June 24, the album's track listing was posted online, and a week later, the album's title was announced as Nightmare of You. At the start of July 2005, "Dear Scene, I Wish I Were Deaf" was posted online. On July 13, 2005, "My Name Is Trouble" was released as the lead single, with "You Don't Have to Tell Me I Was a Terrible Man" and "Dopesick Couples on the Lower East Side" as extra tracks. In August 2005, the band played a series of US shows with Men, Women & Children. Following this, the band toured with Vendetta Red and Bayside in August and September. On August 18, 2005, "The Days Go by Oh So Slow" was posted on the band's PureVolume account. A few days later, they filmed a music video for "I Want to Be Buried in Your Backyard" in Shelter Island, New York.

Nightmare of You was made available for streaming on September 10, before being released three days later. It was done through the band's own label, The Bevonshire Label, which was named after the hotel they stayed at while recording the album. They appeared at CMJ Music Marathon shortly afterwards. On September 16, the video for "I Want to Be Buried in Your Backyard" premiered on Fuse, and was posted online two months later. In October 2005, the band toured with the Honorary Title, and went on a UK tour in November 2005. Later in the month, the band went on a cross-country US tour with the (International) Noise Conspiracy. In December 2005, they filmed a music video for "The Days Go by Oh So Slow". In January 2006, the band played three east shows with Hard-Fi, which was followed by a UK tour with Fall Out Boy. In February 2006, they went on a five-date US tour with the Spill Canvas, before going on a UK tour with the Delays and Captain, which lasted until March 2006.

On March 6, 2006, "The Days Go by Oh So Slow" was released as the second single, with "You Don't Have to Tell Me I Was a Terrible Man" as an extra track. Following the UK tour, Nightmare of You toured the US with She Wants Revenge, Astra Heights, Electric Six, and Rock Kills Kid until April. On April 20, 2006, the video for "The Days Go by Oh So Slow" premiered on MTVU. In May 2006, Nightmare of You appeared at The Bamboozle festival, and toured alongside the Rocket Summer, Brandtson, and Paramore. In June and July, Nightmare of You toured alongside AFI and the Dillinger Escape Plan. In between some of the shows, the band played a few dates with Brand New. Following the tour, the band filmed a video for "My Name Is Trouble". In November, they went on a short west coast US tour. The band closed a year with a one-off holiday show in December. In January 2007, the band went on a tour of the UK. On February 19, 2007, "My Name Is Trouble" and "Dear Scene, I Wish I Were Deaf" were released as a double A-side single. In April 2007, the band and their label left East West Records, citing a lack of distribution for Nightmare of You.

== Reception ==
Professional ratings
Review scores
Source	Rating
AbsolutePunk	95%
AllMusic	3.5/5 stars
Blender	3/5 stars
Drowned in Sound	7/10
Gigwise	6/10 stars
The Guardian	3/5 stars
Punknews.org	4/5 stars
Stylus Magazine	D

Reviewers focused on the songwriting. The Guardian critic Leonie Cooper remarked that with their "glossy, ultra-modern rock, if you're looking for a band to fall in love with in 2007, Nightmare of You are currently looking like pretty fetching prospective partners". AbsolutePunk staff member Drew Beringer thought that the album was "full of personality and is a breath of fresh air in a scene that rehashes the same idea and trend over and over again". Punknews.org staff member Brian Shultz wrote that it can be difficult to maintain the "same abundant consistency to a full, proper record, but with Nightmare Of You's self-titled debut, they've nearly succeeded. It's an exceptional album and a bit hard to believe its status as a first official LP". Raziq Rauf of Drowned in Sound praised the band for side stepping their "hardcore roots for a new, more comfortable outlook where they are more concerned with the finer points of life". He added that "despite its instantaneous nature, this self-titled debut also appears to be a grower".

Blender writer Dennis Lim said with the band's "ingratiating puppy dog of a debut, this Long Island foursome homes in on a demographic that has come to be personified by Natalie Portman’s character in Garden State: girls who love the Shins". Stylus Magazine writer Ayo Jegede remarked that the band "mastered General Studies, digging into every little field and retrieving a little kernel of interest. But rather than plant those kernels in their own soil [...] they’d rather festoon their exterior with the influences hoping some wouldn’t be able to discern their center from the surface". Gigwise's Michelle Lowery wrote that the band's "name may suggest something that ultimately should sound heavier and the pink flowery album cover even hints at a slice of irony but it would be hard pressed to find anything other than made for radio bubbly pop rock with this offering".

== Track listing ==
All songs written by Brandon Reilly.

1. "The Days Go by Oh So Slow" – 3:46
2. "Dear Scene, I Wish I Were Deaf" – 3:20
3. "Thumbelina" – 4:04
4. "My Name Is Trouble" – 3:58
5. "Why Am I Always Right?" – 3:44
6. "I Want to Be Buried in Your Backyard" – 4:05
7. "Ode to Serotonin" – 2:15
8. "Marry Me" – 2:23
9. "In the Bathroom Is Where I Want You" – 3:35
10. "The Studded Cinctures" – 3:35
11. "Heaven Runs on Oil" – 5:00

== Personnel ==
Personnel per booklet.

Nightmare of You

- Joe McCaffrey – guitars
- Brandon Reilly – vocals, guitars
- Sammy Siegler – drums

Additional musicians

- Jason Lader – bass (all except tracks 3 and 11), mellotron (tracks 3 and 4), brass (tracks 3 and 4), keys (tracks 3 and 4)
- Joe Cairnes – bass (tracks 3 and 11)
- Adam MacDougal – keyboards (tracks 1–3, 5, 7, 8, 10 and 11), piano (tracks 1–3, 5, 7, 8, 10 and 11), vocal harmonies
- Stephanie Eitel – backup vocals (tracks 1 and 3)
- Ben Peeler – lap steel (track 3), pedal steel (track 8)
- Joel Shearer – acoustic guitar (track 6)
- Chantal Kreviazuk – background vocals (track 6)
- David Ralicke – horns (track 7)

Production and design

- Jason Lader – producer, engineer, mixing (tracks 2, 7, 8 and 10)
- Bob Boyd – mastering
- Greg Collins – mixing (tracks 1 and 3–6)
- Perry Margouleff – mixing (tracks 9 and 11)
- Chris Avadon – engineer (tracks 9 and 11)
- Crobin – art direction, design
