= I Am the Avalanche (album) =

Studio album by I Am the Avalanche
- Released: September 27, 2005
- Recorded: Avast 2 (Seattle, Washington), Electro Kitty (Seattle, Washington)
- Genre: Post hardcore, indie rock, emo, alternative rock
- Length: 46:37
- Label: Drive-Thru
- Producer: Barrett Jones

I Am the Avalanche chronology
| The Early November/I Am the Avalanche Split EP (2005) | I Am the Avalanche (2005) | Avalanche United (2011) |

Professional ratings
Review scores
| Source | Rating |
|---|---|
| AbsolutePunk.net | 71% |
| AllMusic | 2.5/5 stars |
| Ox-Fanzine | 7/10 |

I Am the Avalanche is the debut album by I Am the Avalanche and was released on September 27, 2005 on Drive-Thru Records. The release date marks the second anniversary of the break-up of singer Vinnie Caruana's previous band, The Movielife.

== Release ==
In June and July 2005, the band played a few headlining shows, before supporting Head Automatica and Gym Class Heroes on separate stints. Following this, they appeared on a week's worth of East Coast Warped Tour shows. The band released a split single with the Early November that featured an acoustic version of "I Took a Beating" and new song "New Disaster". They went on a two-week US tour in August 2005 with Silverstein, Scary Kids Scaring Kids and Evergreen Terrace. Following this, I Am the Avalanche went on a cross-country US tour with Bayside, June, and the Forecast, running into October 2005. I Am the Avalanche was made available for streaming on September 25, 2005 through Mammoth Press' website, before being released two days later through Drive-Thru Records. They played a handful of shows with the Audition and Rock Kills Kids in October 2005, prior to a West Coast tour supporting the Honorary Title the following month, and then supported Hot Rod Circuit on the East Coast.

In January 2006, I Am the Avalanche supported the Starting Line and MxPx on their co-headlining UK tour. Following this, the band toured the rest of the US with No Use for a Name and the Suicide Machines until March 2006. Following this, they supported the Receiving End of Sirens on their US tour in April and May 2006. The band appeared at The Bamboozle and MacRock festivals, and supported Bayside on their US tour. I Am the Avalanche then supported Rx Bandits, prior to an appearance on the Smartpunk stage at that year's Warped Tour. Following this, they embarked on a tour with This Is Hell and the Blackout Pact, which lead into a short stint with BoySetsFire. In September 2006, they went on a short tour of Japan with No Use for a Name; upon returning to the US, they went on a short US East Coast tour with Emanuel. Though the band were initially announced to support Saves the Day on a short tour, they taken off the dates as they were touring Japan at the time. I Am the Avalanche closed out the year supporting Senses Fail on their headline US tour.

In January 2007, I Am the Avalanche went on a US Northeastern headlining tour with support from the Forecast. In September 2007, they went on an East Coast tour with You, Me, and Everyone We Know and Daggermouth. The following month, the band performed at Waidestock festival. They closed out the year with another East Coast tour with Daggermouth. In May 2008, the band performed at The Bamboozle festival and played a handful of Midwest and West Coast shows with Set Your Goals, Hit the Lights, 2*Sweet, and the Years Gone By. Following this, they played some shows with Hit the Lights, Jet Lag Gemini, and the Armada until June 2008. In October 2008, the band supported Four Year Strong on their headlining West Coast and Midwestern tour. In February and March 2009, the band toured Australia as part of the Soundwave festival.

== Track listing ==
(all songs written by Vinnie Caruana)

1. "Dead and Gone" – 3:41
2. "New Disaster" – 3:46
3. "Murderous" – 3:57
4. "Green Eyes" – 4:40
5. "I Took a Beating" – 2:22
6. "Wasted" – 4:34
7. "Always" – 3:42
8. "This Is Dungeon Music" – 2:45
9. "Symphony" – 4:16
10. "Emergency" – 3:56
11. "Clean Up" – 3:47
12. "My Second Restraining Order" – 5:04

== Credits ==
- Vinnie Caruana – vocals, guitar
- Michael Ireland – guitar, piano
- Barrett Jones – piano
- Kellen Robson – bass
- Brett Romnes – drums, percussion
- Brandon Swanson – guitar
