= Popaganda =

Studio album by Head Automatica
- Released: June 6, 2006
- Recorded: October 2005 – January 2006
- Studios: Bay 7, Valley Village, California; Sparky Dark, Calabasas, California
- Genre: Power pop
- Length: 46:03
- Label: Warner Bros.
- Producer: Howard Benson

Head Automatica chronology
Decadence (2004)	Popaganda (2006)

Singles from Popaganda
- 1. "Graduation Day" Released: June 20, 2006; 2. "Lying Through Your Teeth" Released: October 17, 2006

Popaganda is the second studio album by American rock band Head Automatica, released on June 6, 2006, through Warner Bros. Records. While touring in support of their debut studio album Decadence (2004), frontman Daryl Palumbo's Crohn's disease saw the cancellation of some shows throughout 2004 and 2005. By the middle of 2005, they had accumulated 40 songs; between October 2005 and January 2006, the band recorded their next album with producer Howard Benson. Sessions were held at two studios in California: Bay 7 in Valley Village and Sparky Dark in Calabasas. Popaganda is a power pop album that Palumbo said was influenced by the work of the Beatles and Elvis Costello.

Popaganda received mixed reviews from critics, some of whom complimented the songwriting, while others criticized Palumbo's voice and the album's uninspired sound. Before the album was released, Head Automatica embarked on two tours of the United States, one with support from Morningwood and the other with support from My American Heart. The band then supported Avenged Sevenfold and Coheed and Cambria on their co-headlining US tour, and then appeared at the Coachella festival. "Graduation Day" was released to radio in June 2006, which coincided with a support slot for Taking Back Sunday and Angels & Airwaves. They then embarked on a US tour with Rock Kills Kid and Men, Women & Children, following which, "Lying Through Your Teeth" was released to radio in October 2006.

== Background and production ==
Head Automatica released their debut studio album Decadence in August 2004. The band promoted it with tours alongside Interpol, the Rapture and Thrice. As frontman Daryl Palumbo suffered from Crohn's disease, the band were forced to cancel a variety of shows throughout 2004 and 2005. By July 2005, the band had accumulated 40 songs, which they had been working on for the preceding seven months, with Palumbo theorising that their next album would arrive late in the year. Palumbo was due to support the Used on their headlining US tour for the next month with his other band Glassjaw but had to cancel because of Crohn's disease. In October 2005, Head Automatica started recorded with producer Howard Benson; sessions continued into January 2006.

Benson had previously worked on two songs for Decadence; as Palumbo was liked Benson's tendencies for song arrangements and vocals, he decided to enlist him as producer for the whole album. Recording was held at Bay 7 Studios, Valley Village, California and Sparky Dark Studio in Calabasas, California. In the midst of this, the band released to two covers, "Jackie Wilson Said" (1972) by Van Morrison and So It Goes" (1976) by Nick Lowe, to tide fans over until the album was finished. Mike Plotnikoff acted as engineer, and mixed "Laughing at You", "Nowhere Fast", "God", "Shot in the Back (The Platypus)", "She's Not It", "Egyptian Musk", "Cannibal Girl", and "K Horse" at Glenwood Place Studios in Burbank, California, with assistance from Ian Suddarth. Chris Lord-Alge mixed "Graduation Day", "Lying Through Your Teeth", "Scandalous", "Curious", and Million Dollar Decision", with assistant engineer Hatsukazu Inagaki.

== Composition ==
Musically, the sound of Popaganda has been described as power pop. Vocalist/guitarist Daryl Palumbo described the album as being "more musical" than anything he had done previously, calling it highly melodic. Taking influence from the Beatles, in addition to the Mod revival of the 1970s, he wanted "all the hooks to soar and all the songs to be as memorable and melodic as possible." Breaking down the album into sections, he described it as "one part the Knack, one part Cheap Trick, five parts Elvis Costello and the Attractions, one part Graham Parker, and tons of Nick Lowe melody lines" with "a modern take on those artists". It marked a shift away from the dance and electronic influences of their past work. Keyboardist Jessie Nelson said it was inspired by pop musicians such as Costello, Mike and the Mechanics and Steve Winwood, alongside duos Cassius and the Rondo Brothers.

AllMusic reviewer Corey Apar said the band retained the "post-punk dance attitude", though its "filtered this time through late-'70s pop influences" instead of "back-alley beats and electro-rock fuzz" that their previous collaborate Dan the Automator favored. Two of the tracks, namely, "Nowhere Fast" and "Egyptian Musk", recalled the sound of Decadence. The staff at Ultimate Guitar called the guitar work "gritty and sharp" though they followed "plain structures" with three chords. Discussing the title, Palumbo explained it referred to the "writing zone I was in for this whole period in my life". He had toyed with releasing a double album as the song count had risen to 50 tracks.

The album's opening track, "Graduation Day" starts with guitar and piano parts which build into a pop song, akin to the material on early Costello releases. The song includes Gerard Way of My Chemical Romance doing backing vocals, who had been friends with Palumbo for a few years. "Lying Through Your Teeth" is a hair metal song with glam rock-lite chorus sections. It sees the narrator finding out about their partner cheating on them. "Nowhere Fast" incorporates some of the abnormal melodies that Palumbo employed on Glassjaw's Worship and Tribute (2002). "Scandalous" is a neo-doo-wop song that Palumbo attributed to British Invasion acts covering doo-wop songs, and is followed by the straightforward power pop song "Curious". With "God", discussing having to deal with his Crohn's disease. The guitar-heavy "Million Dollar Decision" is a mid-tempo track. The electronic "Egyptian Musk" song evokes the sound of Death from Above, and has a 1980s club atmosphere. A Lord-Alge remix of "Beating Heart Baby", a song from their debut, was included as a bonus track; Palumbo explained that this was the "final mix" of the track which had been left unreleased.

== Release ==
After finishing up recording, the group went on a tour of the US from late January to late February 2006. They were supported by Morningwood. On January 23, 2006, the album's title of Popaganda was revealed. On March 3, 2006, "Graduation Day" was made available for streaming through their Myspace profile. The band appeared at the South by Southwest music conference later that same month, and embarked on a tour of the US, running into April 2006, with My American Heart. On March 28, "Laughing at You" was made available for streaming, and the album's track listing was revealed. On April 4, a digital-only EP was released, titled Pop Rocks, it features the previously released "Graduation Day" and "Laughing at You", as well as new songs "Nowhere Fast" and "God". In April, the band supported Avenged Sevenfold and Coheed and Cambria on their co-headlining tour of the US, but were unable to appear at some of the shows due to Palumbo's illness. On April 7, the album's artwork was revealed, and "Lying Through Your Teeth" was made available for streaming. "Nowhere Fast" was made available for streaming five days later. Following this, the band performed at Coachella. On May 3, a music video was released for "Graduation Day". It was based on 1980s John Hughes films and directed by Tony Petrossian. It was shot at the Loyola High School in Los Angeles, California. On May 24, "Scandalous" was posted on the band's Myspace profile.

Popaganda was made available for streaming through their Myspace on June 2, 2006, and released four days later through Warner Bros. Records. A Lord-Alge mix of "Beating Heart Baby", a song from Decadence, was included a bonus track. In June and July, the band went on tour with Taking Back Sunday and Angels & Airwaves. "Graduation Day" was released to radio on June 20, 2006. From August 2006, the group went on a US tour with Rock Kills Kid and Men, Women & Children, and appeared at the X96 Big Ass Show. Though the trek was intended to last until October 2006, the band cancelled the September and October dates. On August 25, a music video was released for "Lying Through Your Teeth" premiered through Alternative Press' website. "Lying Through Your Teeth" was released to radio on October 17, 2006. The following day, it was announced that drummer Larry Gorman was no longer in the band. Alternative Press reported that he had been kicked out, with Gorman explaining that it was mostly in part to "the fact that the relationship between Daryl and I has slowly been deteriorating over the last couple of years." In October and November, the band went on the MTV$2 Bill Tour alongside Thirty Seconds to Mars. During this trek, they appeared on Last Call with Carson Daly. In February 2007, the band supported Jack's Mannequin on their tour of the US.

== Reception ==
Professional ratings
Review scores
Source	Rating
AllMusic	3.5/5 stars
Melodic	3.5/5 stars
Punknews.org	3/5 stars
Ultimate Guitar	7.7/10

Popaganda was met with mixed reviews from music critics. AllMusic reviewer Corey Apar said the band's change of sound "never seems forced or contrived". He mentioned that during the middle portion "some songs don't initially hit that hard, but the rest of the record keeps things moving along for later listens". Jeff Vrabel of Billboard noted that the album wears its big aspirations on its sequined sleeve", stating that it "drags in its second half and [while] Palumbo’s voice is certainly an acquired taste, his hooks hit more than they miss". Melodic staff writer Kaj Roth considered it an improvement over Decadence, saying that fans of that album would "find lots of future fave songs" on Popaganda. The staff at Ultimate Guitar praised the album for is variety of musical styles, saying it "appeared sounding organic with perky tracks and infectious melodies".

Punknews.org founder Aubin Paul said Palumbo "owes even more to Costello than just his voice", highlight "Graduation Day" as an example. He went to say that Head Automatica " hasn't fully committed to their new sound or discovered what it is -- with far too many borrowed moments" from Costello and his new wave contemporaries. Alternative Press writer J. Bennett said the "most refreshing thing" about the album was that Head Automatica "aren’t a pop band pretending a punk band, [...] or even an emo band pretending to be grown men--but that they’ll do whatever it takes to get Summer naked on the Bait Shop floor". The staff at Chart Attack lambasted it, stating that "between Palumbo's annoyingly affected vocals and the album's scarcity of catchy hooks, most of Popaganda feels thin, flat and desperately fun-free".

Popaganda reached and peaked at number 69 on the Billboard 200, and number 87 on the UK Albums Chart. By September 2006, the album sold 50,000 copies.

== Track listing ==
All songs written by Daryl Palumbo.

1. "Graduation Day" – 3:42
2. "Laughing at You" – 2:45
3. "Lying Through Your Teeth" – 3:29
4. "Nowhere Fast" – 3:00
5. "Scandalous" – 4:10
6. "Curious" – 2:43
7. "God" – 3:01
8. "Shot in the Back (The Platypus)" – 3:43
9. "Million Dollar Decision" – 4:04
10. "She's Not It" – 3:29
11. "Egyptian Musk" – 3:53
12. "Cannibal Girl" – 3:10
13. "K Horse" – 4:48

Bonus track

14. "Beating Heart Baby" (Chris Lord-Alge mix) – 3:26

== Personnel ==
Personnel per booklet.

Head Automatica

- Daryl Palumbo – vocals, guitars, programming
- Jarvis Morgan Holden – bass
- Larry Gorman – drums, backing vocals
- Brandon Arnovick – guitar
- Craig Bonich – guitar
- Jessie Nelson – organ, piano, keys

Additional musicians

- Gerard Way – backing vocals (track 1)

Production and design

- Howard Benson – producer
- Mike Plotnikoff – engineer, mixing (tracks 2, 4, 7, 8 and 10–13)
- Ian Suddarth – assistant
- Chris Lord-Alge – mixing (tracks 1, 3, 5, 6 and 9)
- Hatsukazu Inagaki – assistant engineer
- Sean McCabe – photography, art, design

== Charts ==
Chart performance for Popaganda
Chart (2006)	Peak position
UK Albums Chart (OCC)	87
US Billboard 200	69
