= Wolverines (album) =

Studio album by I Am the Avalanche
- Released: March 18, 2014
- Genre: Punk rock, pop punk, heartland rock
- Length: 31:12
- Label: I Surrender
- Producer: Brett Romnes

I Am the Avalanche chronology
| Avalanche United (2011) | Wolverines (2014) | Dive (2020) |

Wolverines is a 2014 studio album by the Brooklyn-based band I Am the Avalanche.

Professional ratings
Aggregate scores
| Source | Rating |
|---|---|
| Metacritic | 90/100 |
Review scores
| Source | Rating |
| Blare | 6.5/10 |
| Ox-Fanzine | 4/5 stars |
| Rock Sound | 9/10 |
| Thrash Hits | 5/6 |

== Track listing ==
1. "Two Runaways" – 3:23
2. "177" – 2:35
3. "The Shape I'm In" – 3:29
4. "Young Kerouacs" – 3:17
5. "Wolverines" – 1:25
6. "Anna Lee" – 3:07
7. "Save Your Name" – 2:52
8. "Where Were You? " – 4:29
9. "My Lion Heart" – 2:42
10. "One Last Time" – 3:53

== Credits ==
- Vinnie Caruana – vocals
- Michael Ireland – guitar
- Kellen Robson – bass
- Brett "The Ratt" Romnes – drums
- Brandon Swanson – guitar
