= Avalanche United =

Studio album by I Am the Avalanche
- Released: October 11, 2011
- Recorded: February–July 2011
- Studio: Studio 159, Waldwick, New Jersey
- Genre: Melodic hardcore, punk rock
- Length: 35:38
- Label: I Surrender
- Producer: Brett Romnes

I Am the Avalanche chronology
I Am the Avalanche (2005)	Avalanche United (2011)	Wolverines (2014)

Singles from Avalanche United
- 1. "Holy Fuck" Released: August 23, 2011; 2. "Brooklyn Dodgers" Released: September 13, 2011

Avalanche United is the second studio album by American rock band, I Am the Avalanche, released by I Surrender Records on October 11, 2011. Following the release of their eponymous debut album in 2005, the band's activity slowed. Vocalist Vinnie Caruana went through a divorce and subsequently wrote an abundance of material. I Am the Avalanche recorded Avalanche United between February and July 2011 at Studio 159 in Waldwick, New Jersey. Described as a melodic hardcore and punk rock album, Avalanche United also features material written by guitarist Mike Ireland.

Avalanche United received generally positive reviews from music critics, some praising the musicianship. "Holy Fuck" and "Brooklyn Dodgers" were released as singles in August and September 2011, respectively, before the release of the album. To promote Avalanche United, I Am the Avalanche supported the bands Saves the Day and Bayside on their co-headlining US tour, and released a music video for "Brooklyn Dodgers". The band ended the year with a headlining UK tour. In the first half of 2012, the band toured the UK and the US again, and appeared on that year's Warped Tour.

== Background and recording ==
I Am the Avalanche released their eponymous debut album in late 2005, through Drive-Thru Records. Though the band was out of the public eye for some time, they frequently went on regional tours. Eventually, the band members settled into their home life and day jobs, performing shows infrequently. Vocalist Vinnie Caruana married an English woman whom he later divorced. This led to him writing a large amount of material. In contrast to their previous album, which was written in Seattle, the band wrote new material in New York City.

I Am the Avalanche recorded the album at Studio 159, in Waldwick, New Jersey, between February and July 2011. Drummer Brett Romnes was Avalanche United's producer, assisted by Brian Turner and Greg Altman. Brian McTernan performed additional drum production at Salad Days Studio in Baltimore, Maryland. American musician Machine mixed the recordings at The Machine Shop Recording Studios in Belleville, New Jersey. Alan Douches mastered the album at West West Side Music in New York City. In between recording sessions, Caruana reunited with his previous band the Movielife for a series of performances between May and August 2011.

== Composition and lyrics ==
Musically, the sound of the Avalanche United explores melodic hardcore and punk rock. Discussing the album title, Caruana said that it "stands for the band, family, friends and fans – one big gang." Caruana wrote the lyrics and guitarist Mike Ireland wrote the music for "Holy Fuck", "Amsterdam", "I'll Be Back Around" and "Gratitude"; Caruana wrote the music for the remaining songs. Anthony Raneri of Bayside arranged "I'll Be Back Around" and "Dead Friends". Caruana's voice emulated the vocal style he used on The Movielife's This Time Next Year (2000).

The opening track "Holy Fuck" is an aggressive pop punk song about Caruana's divorce. The next songs, "Brooklyn Dodgers" and "Amsterdam" come across as a mix between the Gaslight Anthem and the Ramones. "Brooklyn Dodgers" is dedicated to what Caruana dubbed the "real New York". Caruana wrote it in an apartment he shared with bassist Kellen Robson in Queens, New York. "Amsterdam" tells of the band's experiences in the Netherlands while being on drugs. "I'll Be Back Around" sees Caruana dealing with anxiety disorder. "Is This Really Happening?" is Caruana's first love song, and is followed by "This One's on Me", a drinking song. "Dead Friends" is about dying young and not living life to its fullest potential.

Caruana said "You've Got Spiders" was written about "little weasels who try to scratch their way into our lives". "The Grave Digger's Argument" is about a gravedigger coming to terms that the only way to be rid of his wife is to bury her in his backyard. It recalled the work of Lifetime, and features a vocal appearance from Raneri. "Casey's Song" is about Caruana's friend of the same name who commands large boats. With "The Place You Love is Gone", Caruana said: "We, as people, take everything for granted. ... Sometimes a life-changing thing will happen and wake you up." "Gratitude" is dedicated to the band's fans, family members and friends for their support. The song ends with a group chant of the album's title.

== Release ==
"Holy Fuck" was made available for streaming on August 22, 2011, and released as a single the following day. On September 7, the track listing for Avalanche United was posted online. "Brooklyn Dodgers" was made available for streaming on September 12 and released as a single the following day. The song was available for free download through the band's Facebook page. "Amsterdam" was made available for streaming on September 28. Avalanche United was made available for streaming on October 6, before being released in the US on October 11, through I Surrender Records. The album was released by different labels in other countries: 3Wise Records in Australia, Kick Rock Invasion in Japan and Xtra Mile Recordings in the UK. The Australian and Japanese versions included the bonus track "Summer's Back Again", while the iTunes edition included the bonus track "Conan O'Brien". The artwork was done by Timmy Brothers, with photography from Julian Gilbert.

In October and November, the band supported Saves the Day and Bayside on their co-headlining US tour. To coincide with the tour, the four groups each contributed one track to a four-way split single. I Am the Avalanche's contribution was "Holy Fuck". On November 15, the music video for "Brooklyn Dodgers" was released. The video sees the band traveling through their hometown of Brooklyn, New York. The following month, the band embarked on a headlining UK tour, with support from Hostage Calm and Apologies, I Have None. In January 2012, the band played a few east coast shows with support from Balance and Composure, before touring the UK with Brand New in the following month. In March, the band toured the US with Hostage Calm and Banquets. The band had planned to embark on a two-week European tour in April, however, it was canceled because of unforeseen circumstances. The band appeared on the 2012 Warped Tour, played a few headlining shows, and supported MxPx.

== Reception ==
Professional ratings
Aggregate scores
Source	Rating
Metacritic	85/100
Review scores
Source	Rating
AbsolutePunk	90%
Blare	3.5/5 stars
Dead Press!	10/10 stars
Ox-Fanzine	4/5 stars
Punknews.org	4/5 stars
Rock Sound	8/10

Avalanche United met with generally positive reviews from music critics. At Metacritic, the album received an average score of 85, based on four reviews.

Dead Press! reviewer Gary Cassidy felt that Avalanche United was a perfect title for the album: "this band seem tighter than ever, the backing vocals are immaculate, the drum beats set the rhythm perfectly, [and] the guitar riffs are just beautifully melodic and catchy". The album's tempo was "very controlled, but the energy and emotion can’t be questioned ... this is nostalgic and meaningful punk." AbsolutePunk staff member Drew Beringer wrote that the songs never take the "foot off the pedal", and the record contains "a heaviness that wasn't as prevalent" on their debut album.

Punknews.org's Rich Cocksedge liked Caruana's lyricism, calling it "insightful and interesting". He added that with a "sound that has got a strong basis in punk but with massive doses of melody," the album came across as "quite an impressive ... [and] really pleasing surprise to boot". Emily Kearns of Rock Sound wrote the band delivered "a fiery, honest and raw state of affairs as [Caruana] confronts his demons". Ox-Fanzine writer Thomas Eberhardt said the band "desperately belong in the pub and gutter vocabulary of the big city music lover". He added that the music is a "combination of street punk songs and hardcore attitude". Blare's Joshua Khan wrote that the band "power[ed] through melodic hardcore bursts with sweat, tears and emotion running down their face".

Blare ranked Avalanche United as the 42nd best album in their top 50 albums of the year list.

== Track listing ==
All lyrics by Vinnie Caruana. All recordings produced by Brett Romnes.

No.	Title	Writer(s)	Length
1.	"Holy Fuck"	Mike Ireland	2:58
2.	"Brooklyn Dodgers"	Vinnie Caruana	3:06
3.	"Amsterdam"	Ireland	2:59
4.	"I'll Be Back Around"	Ireland	2:34
5.	"Is This Really Happening?"	Caruana	3:08
6.	"This One's on Me"	Caruana	2:32
7.	"Dead Friends"	Caruana	3:49
8.	"You've Got Spiders"	Caruana	2:23
9.	"The Gravedigger's Argument" (feat. Anthony Raneri)	Caruana	2:05
10.	"Casey's Song"	Caruana	3:22
11.	"The Place You Love Is Gone"	Caruana	2:45
12.	"Gratitude"	Ireland	3:57
Total length:			35:38

== Personnel ==
Personnel per booklet.

I Am the Avalanche

- Vinnie Caruana – vocals
- Brett "The Ratt" Romnes – drums
- Brandon Swanson – guitar
- Mike Ireland – guitar
- Kellen Robson – bass

Additional musician

- Anthony Raneri – guest vocals (track 9)
- Brett "The Ratt" Romnes – producer, recording
- Brian Turner – assistant
- Greg Altman – assistant
- Brian McTernan – additional drum production
- Machine – mixing
- Alan Douches – mastering
- Timmy Brothers – layout, artwork
- Julian Gilbert – all photography
- Jeffrey Everett – Avalanche United logo
