= Ritual Decay =

Studio album by Lowheaven
- Released: August 29, 2025
- Length: 43:00
- Label: MNRK
- Producer: Brett Romnes

Singles from Ritual Decay
- 1. "Chemical Pattern" Released: May 13, 2025

Ritual Decay is the debut studio album by Canadian post-metal band Lowheaven. It was released on August 29, 2025, via MNRK Music Group in LP, CD and digital formats.

== Background ==
Ritual Decay was produced by the Movielife drummer Brett Romnes and mastered by Finnish composer Magnus Lindberg. "Chemical Pattern" was released as a single on May 13, 2025.

== Reception ==
Professional ratings
Review scores
Source	Rating
Distorted	7/10
Kerrang!	4/5
New Noise	3.5/5 stars

The album received a 3.5-star rating from New Noise, whose reviewer Federico Zoppetti stated, "It's quite hard to talk about a precise genre: the band roam between heavy hardcore moments and melodic yet very painfully emotional ones in a perfect and completely darkened harmony."

Rating the album seven for Distorted, Gavin Brown remarked, "Mixing screamo, post-hardcore, metal and intense soundscapes in a melting pot of ideas that is in turn beautiful, cathartic and above all else; cinematic." Kerrang!'s Sam Law noted it as "an album capable of pulling even the cheeriest listeners into its hypnotic tailspin – then hurling them out on a wave of catharsis, feeling all the more alive on the other side," rating it four.

== Track listing ==
All tracks are written by Lowheaven.

Ritual Decay track listing
No.	Title	Length
1.	"In Grievance"	4:02
2.	"Chemical Pattern"	3:19
3.	"Cancer Sleep"	3:06
4.	"Nothing Else Frail"	4:17
5.	"Amherst"	4:59
6.	"Mercy Death"	4:10
7.	"Fucking Hell"	3:48
8.	"Fighter Valley"	5:24
9.	"Violence"	5:07
10.	"Manic Grace"	4:48
Total length:		43:00

== Personnel ==
Credits adapted from Bandcamp.

=== Lowheaven ===
- Mikey Buchta – performance
- Pat Pajak – performance
- Alex Pley – performance
- Dan Thomson – performance

=== Additional contributors ===
- Brett Romnes – production, mixing, recording
- Rob Chiarappa – engineering assistance
- Hannah Wrocklage – additional editing
- Dante Fortino – drums
- Magnus Lindberg – mastering
