= Craig Bonich =

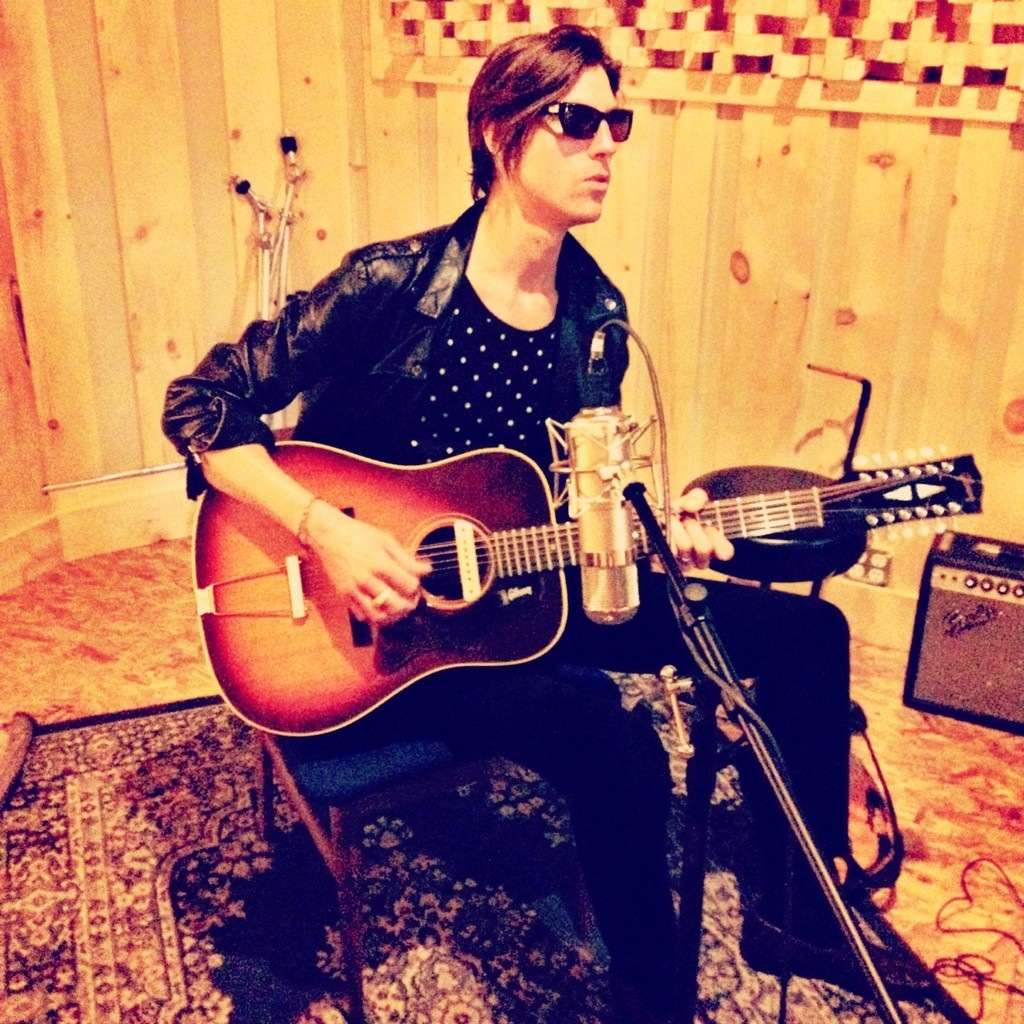

Background information
- Also known as: Bon
- Born: July 24, 1981 (age 44); Long Island, New York, U.S.
- Genres: Alternative rock
- Labels: Yeproc warner bros

Craig Bonich (born July 24, 1981), also known as Bon, is best known as the guitarist for alternative pop rock band Head Automatica. Bonich co-wrote the hit song from Head Automatica's 1st album Decadence, called "Beating Heart Baby".

Bonich recently joined Jeremy Lublin of We Are The Fury to create the Romans. The band's single "Let's Get It On" is featured in a Royal Caribbean TV commercial in the UK and Ireland. Past collaborations include Rick Penzone of Men Women and Children and Jon Safley formerly of Lemon Sun in Los Angeles based New Romans, toured with Seattle art punk band Jaguar Love as a bass guitarist, and played with the live incarnation of This Is Ivy League. Appeared in the video "Baby" by The Phenomenal Hand Clap Band. Guitarist in Jeremy and the harlequins (yep Roc records) Born July 24, 1981 - He grew up in Bellmore, Long Island and has a fraternal twin brother named Daniel. Bonich lives in the East Village of Manhattan.
