= We Are the Fury =

American rock band

- We Are The Fury playing Jillian's in Las Vegas on March 8, 2008

Background information
- Also known as: Hearsay (1999-2002); Hearsay TAO (2002-2005)
- Origin: Toledo, Ohio, United States of America
- Genres: Post-punk, Alternative rock, Indie rock
- Years active: 1999–present
- Members: Christopher Hatfield; Alan Hoffar; Jeremy Lublin; Stephan Lublin; Brady Leffler
- Past members: Todd Wehrle
- Website: www.wearethefury.net

We Are the Fury is an American rock band from Toledo, Ohio.

== History ==
The band was founded in Toledo, Ohio in 1999, as a nu metal band called Hearsay. The original lineup consisted of vocalist Jeremy Lublin, guitarist Chris Hatfield, bassist Alan Hoffar, and drummer Stephan Lublin. Shortly after this, the band changed their name to Hearsay TAO and started playing post-hardcore music. They added keyboardist Todd Wehrle and recorded their first album Where Vision Ends.

In 2002 they released the EP By Land, by Air, by Sleep, renamed themselves The Fury after one of their first songs "Pretty Boy Fury", and released a second self-titled EP in 2005. The name change was associated with another genre change, as the band adopted a post-punk sound. In mid-2005, they signed to One Big Spark Records (a Warner Bros. Records subsidiary) and had to change their name to We Are the Fury for legal reasons. The band re-released their EP as Infinite Jest through the label in 2006, and released their debut full-length album, Venus, May 22, 2007. They were named an "Artist to Watch" by Rolling Stone in 2007.

In June 2008, the band was released from their recording contract with One Big Spark due to the label going under. Stephan left the band that year to pursue culinary training and career in France. Chris Hatfield and Jeremy Lublin went on to start a band called New Romans with Craig Bonich of Head Automatica and formerly Jaguar Love, Rick Penzone of Men Women and Children, and Jon Safley formerly of Lemon Sun. Jeremy was the lead singer of New York-based glam rock band Romans in 2012. Stephan joined Jeremy in New York and formed Jeremy & the Harlequins in 2013 with some friends; one of their songs appears in the 2014 film Edge of Tomorrow. In 2015, Jeremy and Stephan formed Fury Bros., a candle, soap, and cologne store. The company holds the rights of We are the Fury's releases, such as those from 2018 to 2023.

== Reception ==
Reviews have described the sound of We Are the Fury as a mix of "late-80s cock rock bravado" that "bridges the gap between '70s glam rock and '00s pop punk with their debut full-length, Venus".

== Discography ==
As Hearsay TAO

- Where Vision Ends
- By Land, By Air, By Sleep EP (2002)
- By Land, By Air, By Sleep LP (2004)

As The Fury

- The Fury EP (2005)

As We Are the Fury

1. Infinite Jest (re-release of The Fury EP, 2006)
2. Venus (One Big Spark, 2007)
