= Venus (We Are the Fury album) =

Studio album by We Are the Fury
- Released: May 22, 2007
- Genre: Glam punk Pop punk
- Length: 46:22
- Label: East West Records; One Big Spark
- Producer: Tim Patalan, Daryl Palumbo

We Are the Fury chronology
Infinite Jest (2006)	Venus (2007)

Professional ratings
Review scores
Source	Rating
Emotional Punk	7/10 stars
Allmusic	3.0/5 stars

Venus is the first album by We Are the Fury. It was released on May 22, 2007.

== Track listing ==
No.	Title	Length
1.	"Venus"
2.	"Now You Know"
3.	"So Physical"
4.	"Close Your Eyes"
5.	"Camera Tricks"
6.	"Still Don't Know Your Name"
7.	"Hey Love"
8.	"Saturday Night"
9.	"You're My Halo (Prom Song)"
10.	"Blue Coat, Black Hair"
11.	"Don't Need A Thing"
12.	"Grand Divider"
13.	"Better Off This Way" (Bonus Track)
