= Infomaniac =

Studio album by Nightmare of You
- Released: August 4, 2009
- Recorded: 2009
- Studio: Magic Shop, New York City
- Genre: Indie rock
- Length: 41:31
- Label: The Bevonshire Label, Brookvale
- Producer: Nightmare of You

Nightmare of You chronology
Nightmare of You (2006)	Infomaniac (2009)

Infomaniac is the second studio album by American indie rock band Nightmare of You.

== Background ==
In October 2007, the band announced that they had begun working on their second album. Between April and June 2008, the band toured across the US; the April dates were supported by Edison Glass and Jukebox the Ghost, while the remainder were supported by the Graduate, Paper Rival, and Edison Glass. On July 22, 2008, a demo of a track titled "I Think I'm Getting Older" was posted on the band's Myspace profile. It was mentioned that the band had recently recorded 6 or 7 songs in guitarist Joe McCaffrey's bedroom. On July 29, another demo, titled "Someday But Not Today" was posted online. It was mentioned that the band were writing and demoing songs for their next album. In August 2008, third and fourth demos, "Hey Sweetheart" and "Long Island", were posted online. "Eustacia Vye" was made available on the group's Myspace on November 19.

== Release ==
In January 2009, the band played a few East Coast shows with Bottle Up and Go and U.S. Royalty. On April 27, 2009, Infomaniac was announced for release in three months' time; alongside this, "Infomaniac" was posted on the band's Myspace profile. The following week, the album's track listing was posted online. On May 20, 2009, "I Think I'm Getting Older" was posted online. After supporting Alkaline Trio and Saves the Day on their co-headlining US tour, Nightmare of You embarked on their own headlining US tour, between June and August 2009. They were supported by Plushgun, Brian Bonz and Aushua. The album was originally set to be released through their own record label, The Bevonshire Label, on July 21, but later delayed until August 4. On December 24, 2009, a music video was released for "Experimental Bed".

== Reception ==
Professional ratings
Review scores
Source	Rating
AbsolutePunk	68%
AllMusic	3.5/5 stars

AbsolutePunk awarded the album a score of 68%, saying "everything on Infomaniac feels muted and tame. The drums barely come alive, the guitars are far too airy and light, and even Reilly's vocals appear wayward and overly self-indulgent." Reviewer Gregory Robson also mentioned numerous times that it did not live up to their debut self-titled album.

== Track listing ==
1. "Good Morning, Waster" – 1:44
2. "Eustacia Vye" – 3:34
3. "I Think I'm Getting Older" – 2:45
4. "Someday But Not Today" – 4:11
5. "Hey Sweetheart" – 2:26
6. "Experimental Bed" – 3:37
7. "Amsterdam" – 4:38
8. "Gavi" – 3:50
9. "Tell Me When It's Over" – 3:40
10. "A Pair of Blue Eyes" – 3:54
11. "Please Don't Answer Me" – 4:13
12. "Goodnight, Devil" – 2:52
