= Infinite Jest (album) =

EP by We Are the Fury
- Released: 2006
- Recorded: 2005
- Genre: Indie rock
- Label: New Armada
- Producer: Tim Patalan

We Are the Fury chronology
The Fury (EP) (2005)	Infinite Jest (2006)	Venus (2007)

Professional ratings
Review scores
Source	Rating
AbsolutePunk.net	75% link
Answers.com	link
AllMusic	3.5/5 stars

Infinite Jest is an EP by the American indie rock band We Are the Fury. It was released in 2006 as a re-issue of their 2005 EP The Fury. Its name is taken from the David Foster Wallace novel entitled Infinite Jest, the title of which is in turn taken from a line in William Shakespeare's Hamlet.

It was the band's second EP and the only one to be released under the New Armada record label. Following the release of this EP, the band moved to One Big Spark and released their debut album, Venus.

The EP is available to listen to on the band's PureVolume page.

== Track listing ==
The album contains five tracks:

No.	Title	Length
1.	"Better Off This Way"	2:47
2.	"Anesthetic Parade"	2:46
3.	"Nation, Forgive Us"	3:28
4.	"Parody at the Masquerade"	3:20
5.	"Soap Opera"	5:06
