= I Am the Avalanche =

American punk rock band

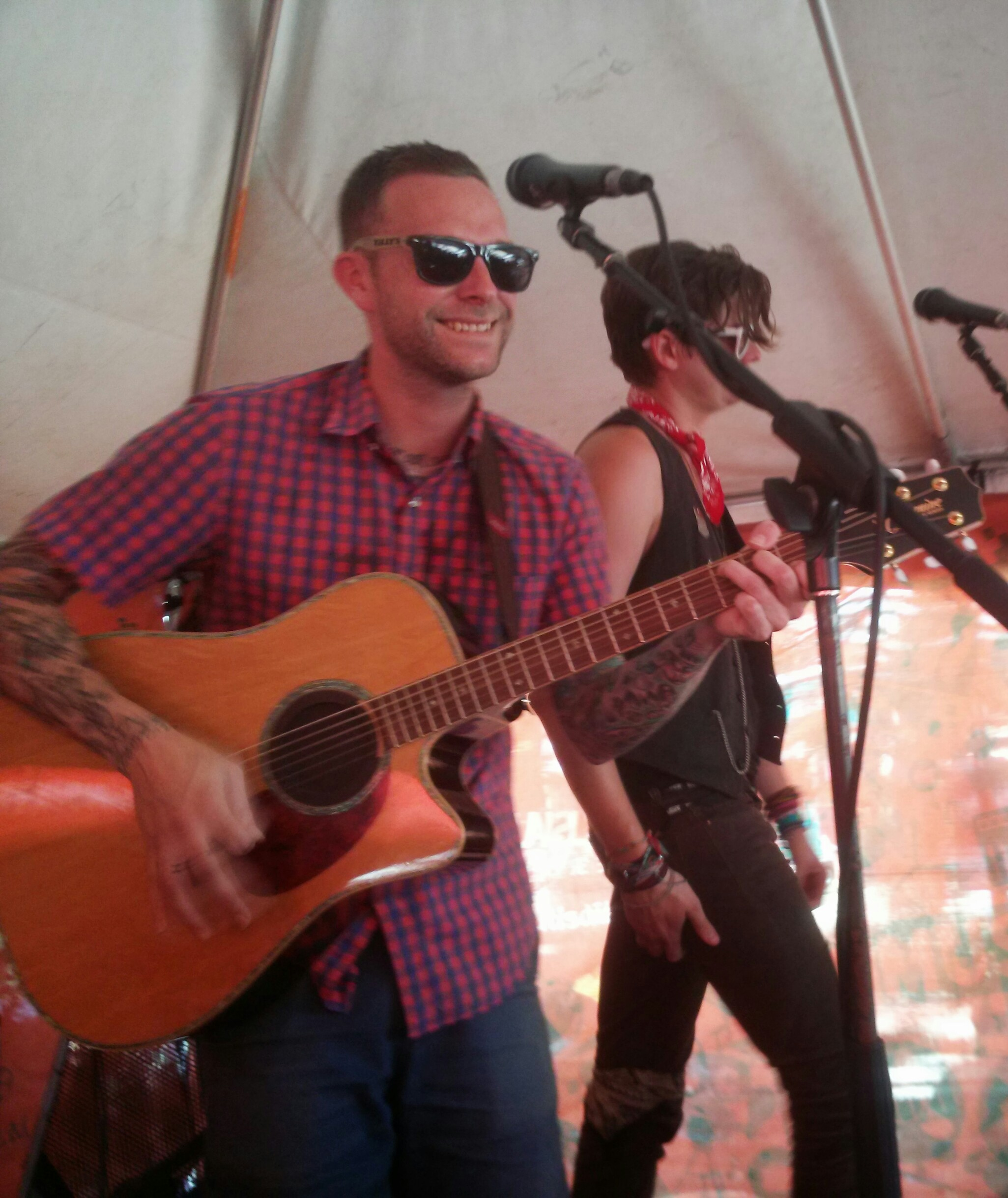

Background information
- Origin: Brooklyn, New York, United States
- Genres: Punk rock; indie rock; pop punk; melodic hardcore; post-hardcore; emo
- Years active: 2004–present
- Labels: Equal Vision Records, I Surrender, Drive-Thru Records, Big Scary Monsters
- Members: Vinnie Caruana; Brett "The Ratt" Romnes; Michael Ireland; Kellen Robson; Brandon Swanson

I Am the Avalanche is an American punk rock band from Brooklyn, New York. The group's name comes from a lyric written by Vinnie Caruana for a song which was later discarded. The phrase also appears in the poem "Oh, Immobility, Death's Vast Associate" by Stephen Dobyns; however, Caruana maintains that this is a coincidence, and that he was not aware of the poem until after naming the band.

== History ==
I Am the Avalanche was formed by vocalist Vinnie Caruana after the break-up of his previous band The Movielife, and followed his short stint playing in Head Automatica. The band also comprises drummer Brett "The Ratt" Romnes (who also produces the albums), and guitarist Brandon Swanson (former fill-in for Further Seems Forever), guitarist Michael Ireland and Kellen Robson, the former bassist of Long Island band Scraps and Heart Attacks are also members. Aside from handling vocal duties, Caruana sometimes plays guitar on certain songs such as "This Is Dungeon Music," giving the band a three-guitar attack. He has also been seen playing guitar on "My Second Restraining Order." These are in line with the band's heavier, slower sound compared to the members' previous efforts.

The band toured the United Kingdom before they played America, playing 2 shows over the Halloween weekend in October 2004. Soon after this, on September 27, 2005, they released their self-titled debut album, produced by drummer Barrett Jones on Drive-Thru Records. The album received significant press coverage and mostly good reviews.

I Am The Avalanche have played the Vans' Warped Tour, The Bamboozle Festival, and have also toured with Bleeding Through, Bayside, The Sleeping, No Use for a Name, Halifax, The Fully Down, Senses Fail, The Forecast, Bouncing Souls, The Loved Ones and, most recently, Saves the Day and Brand New, and in October 2008, they headed out on a month-long tour with Four Year Strong and This is Hell.

The band played shows all over Australia in February 2009 as part of the annual Soundwave Festival. During their set on the Sydney leg, they played three demo tracks – "Winter Summer", "Brooklyn Dodgers" and "You've Got Spiders" (the latter two of which appeared on their second album Avalanche United) – and Vinnie Caruana also gave word of new album being released in the near future.

In 2009, Set Your Goals released the title track off their second studio album titled This Will Be the Death of Us through Myspace, which featured Vinnie on vocals, furthering recent rumors that they were going to be doing a side-project together.

On March 6, 2011, I Am The Avalanche opened for Paramore during a concert in Puerto Rico, where they played several songs from their upcoming album. The album, Avalanche United, which was released on October 11, 2011 saw the band drifting away from their first release's "mid-tempo, heavy rock feel" of their debut, and incorporating melodic punk influences such as Descendents and Bad Religion.

Avalanche United was released on October 11, 2011, to incredibly positive reviews. In a review of the album, rock music magazine 'The 1st Five' acknowledged the long wait between the band's first and second records, and also the growth it had afforded them; "Yes, six years was a long time to wait for a new I Am The Avalanche record. But if they can make another leap like the one between their self-titled debut and Avalanche United I’ll wait as long as they like." I Am The Avalanche then played a stint on The Vans Warped Tour from June 16 – July 3, 2012, in support of the record, and also went on to play as part of that year's Soundwave Festival in Australia.

In September 2013, it was announced that I Am The Avalanche had entered The Barber Shop Studios to begin tracking their third full length, and shortly afterwards, guitarist Mike Ireland announced his departure from the group. On January 8, 2014, the band announced via their Facebook page that their third full-length album, titled Wolverines, would be released on March 17 of that year on I Surrender Records. They wrote, 'WOLVERINES is an album that’s been a serious labor of love for us and one that we’re incredibly proud of. The Ratt, our super-talented drummer, produced the record and the great Will Yip mixed it.'. At the same time, they streamed the first single from the album, 'The Shape I'm In', on Esquire Magazine's website.

On November 20, 2020, I Am The Avalanche released their fourth full-length album, DIVE, which saw Ireland return to the group. According to Caruana, this album draws from influences like Seaweed, Descendents, No Use for a Name, the Beatles, the Libertines, Jets to Brazil, Jawbreaker, Lagwagon,

Fifth album The Horror Show was released on April 10, 2026, with New Noise Magazine calling it "their most dynamic effort to date." The album deals with themes of grief experienced by lyricist Caruana after the death of a close friend, feelings which he characterizes as both unique and universal.

== Band members ==
- Vinnie Caruana – lead vocals
- Brett "The Rat" Romnes – drums
- Mike Ireland – guitars
- Kellen Robson – bass
- Brandon Swanson – guitars

== Discography ==
=== Studio albums ===
- I Am the Avalanche (September 27, 2005)
- Avalanche United (#9 on Heatseekers) (October 11, 2011)
- Wolverines (Billboard 200 #108) (March 17, 2014)
- Dive (November 20, 2020)
- The Horror Show (April 10th, 2026)

=== EPs ===
- The Early November/I Am the Avalanche (July 26, 2005)
- Bayside/I Am the Avalanche (Summer 2007)
- Bayside/Saves the Day/I Am the Avalanche/Transit (November 2011)

=== Music videos ===
- Brooklyn Dodgers (2011)
- The Shape I'm In (2014)
