= Astra Heights =

- Origin: Houston, Texas
- Genre: Alternative rock
- Years active: 2001–present
- Labels: Universal Records, Imperativa Records, Immediate Music
- Members: Mark Morales; James Morales; Timothy Morales; Lyle; Bernard Yin
- Past members: Michael Morales, Philip Morales, Joshua Morales.

Astra Heights is an alternative rock band originally from Houston, Texas. They now live and work in Los Angeles. In 2007 they released a full-length album, Good Problems, on iTunes through Universal Records.

== Discography ==
- Good Problems (2007)
- The Engineer's Library (2008)
- Ship of Theseus (2010)
- Danger for Beginners (2016)
