= Nightmare of You =

American indie rock band

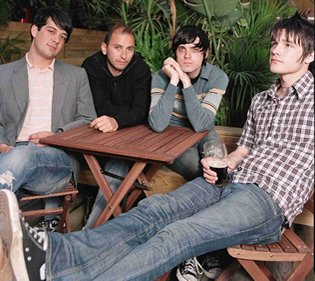

Background information
- Origin: Long Island, New York, USA
- Genres: Indie rock, indie emo, emo, alternative rock
- Years active: 2004–present
- Labels: East West (2004–2006); The Bevonshire Label
- Members: Brandon Reilly; Joseph McCaffrey; Michael Fleichmann
- Past members: Samuel Siegler; Ryan Heil; Phil Navetta; Brandon Meyer

Nightmare of You is an American indie rock band from New York City. Formed in 2004, the band currently consists of original founder vocalist Brandon Reilly, guitarist Joseph McCaffrey, and drummer Michael Fleischmann.

They have toured the US, and the UK both as a headline act and in support of other artists including AFI, Fall Out Boy, She Wants Revenge, Brand New, The (International) Noise Conspiracy, and Circa Survive. They have previously been nominated for mtvU Woodie awards for Best Tour and Most Downloaded. In April 2006, they were the winners of Yahoo! Music's "Who's Next?" competition; past winners include My Chemical Romance, Coheed and Cambria, and Hinder.

== History ==
Brandon Reilly was originally a member of the now defunct band The Rookie Lot, alongside current members of Brand New; Jesse Lacey, Garrett Tierney and Brian Lane. After the band parted ways, he became the guitarist of The Movielife and then eventually formed Nightmare of You.

The band originally self-released their debut album on their own label, The Bevonshire Label. They licensed it to East West Records in the US and Full Time Hobby in the UK. Three singles, with accompanying music videos, were released from the self-titled album. The singles included "My Name is Trouble", "The Days Go by Oh So Slow" and "I Want to Be Buried in Your Backyard". All three videos were featured on the Fuse TV shows Steven's Untitled Rock Show and Oven Fresh. Another song from the album, "Dear Scene, I Wish I Were Deaf", was also featured in the EA Sports video game, FIFA 07.

In the Spring of 2007 The Bevonshire Label split with East West Records. Nightmare of You then self-released a five-song EP, entitled Bang!, on September 11, 2007. They toured in support of the EP with a headlining tour of the US in May and June 2008. They were supported by the Graduate, Paper Rival, and Edison Glass.

In 2008, the band recruited drummer Michael Fleischmann (formerly of Permanent ME), and began writing for their next studio album. Longtime friend and Brooklyn-based musician Brandon Meyer joined the band on bass in December 2008, replacing original bassist Ryan Heil, playing his first show with the group on December 29, 2008, at the Crazy Donkey in Long Island, NY. The band then entered the studio in January 2009 to begin recording their sophomore full-length record.

The new album, Infomaniac, was recorded at the Magic Shop recording studio in the SOHO section of New York City in January 2009, co-produced by the band and Brian Thorn. The record was reportedly recorded and tracked in just a couple of weeks, with 16-hour sessions. Various video updates were posted on the band's MySpace page throughout the sessions, keeping fans in the loop. The new album was finished shortly thereafter, entitled Infomaniac and was released through The Bevonshire Label on August 4, 2009. On May 18, 2009 Spin magazine released a download on their website of a new song entitled "I Think I'm Getting Older", which is the lead track off of Infomaniac.

Nightmare of You started touring again in 2009, seeing the band first headline a UK tour in April (with support by Philadelphia-based band Jukebox the Ghost), followed directly by a support slot on the Alkaline Trio/Saves the Day tour in the United States. After a three-week break, the band then set out on its own 6-week US headlining tour in June/July of '09, seeing the band play more than 35 cities in anticipation of the new Infomaniac album release.

On December 10, 2009, at a gig at Binghamton University, Reilly announced that he would be departing for Italy thus placing the band on an indefinite hiatus.

On May 10, 2012, Nightmare of You released a new song entitled "Out Of My Mind" on their website. In July, Brandon Reilly released "Give Us A Kiss" on their website.

== Band members ==
- Brandon Reilly - vocals, guitars (2004–Present)
- Joseph McCaffrey - guitar (2004–Present)
- Michael Fleischmann - drums (2008–Present)

== Former members ==
- Phil Navetta - bass (2004)
- Samuel Siegler - drums (2004–2008) (Formerly of Rival Schools, CIV and Glassjaw)
- Ryan Heil - bass (2005–2008)
- Brandon Meyer - bass (2008–2009)

== Discography ==
=== Studio albums ===
- Nightmare of You (2005, The Bevonshire Label)
- Infomaniac (2009, The Bevonshire Label)

=== Extended plays ===
- Nightmare of You (2005, East West)
- Bang! EP (2007)
- Nightmare of You Double Disc Vinyl (2008, The Bevonshire Label)
- B-Sides and Demos [2004-2008] (2012)

=== Singles ===
- "My Name is Trouble" (2006)
- "I Want to Be Buried in Your Backyard" (2006)
- "The Days Go by Oh So Slow" (2006)
- "I Think I'm Getting Older" (2009)
- "Out of My Mind" (2012)
- "Give Us A Kiss" (2012)
