= This Is Ivy League =

- Origin: New York City, New York, U.S.
- Genres: Acoustic, pop, indie
- Years active: 2005–2014
- Label: TwentySeven Records
- Members: Ryland Blackinton; Alex Suarez

This Is Ivy League was an indie band formed in 2005 by friends Ryland Blackinton and Alex Suarez (of Cobra Starship).

== Formation ==
Alex and Ryland met in 1997 in high school. Both were avid guitar players and both played in local bands with varying degrees of accolade. This Is Ivy League formed in August 2005 when Ryland discovered that Alex was not only still playing music but living just ten minutes away from him in Brooklyn, New York and the two began a collaboration. Although they spent most of their time touring with Cobra Starship, Alex and Ryland continued to write songs for This Is Ivy League, vowing to record an album once Cobra settled down. The album was released on April 1, 2008, on TwentySeven Records. The album, like the London Bridges EP, was recorded entirely between the duo's Brooklyn apartments.

== Discography ==
- London Bridges EP
- This Is Ivy League
