= Brandon Reilly (musician) =

American musician (born 1981)

- Born: Brandon Reilly; May 18, 1981 (age 45)
- Origin: Levittown, Long Island, New York
- Genres: Indie rock
- Years active: 1998–present

Brandon Reilly (born May 18, 1981) is an American musician, best known as the lead singer and guitarist for the band Nightmare of You.

== Biography ==
Reilly first played with the Long Island hardcore band Confide, featuring Gregory Catanese of Forklift Driver. Reilly described the sound of Confide as "Tripface fighting One4One in an alley behind a laundromat while Snapcase tried to break it up." After Confide disbanded due to the music going in a more emotional style, Reilly joined up and helped form The Rookie Lot. The band played locally and released a demo tape, as well as a split 7-inch with fellow Long Islanders, Yearly. The Rookie Lot dissolved, seeing Reilly join The Movielife as the lead guitarist whilst other members formed the band Brand New. After The Movielife broke up he formed Nightmare of You, an indie pop act. He began writing his own songs while still in The Movielife. Before beginning Nightmare of You he had never done vocals; he was admittedly "a little scared" of singing and thought his voice was "not tempered to be a vocalist, especially not a lead vocalist."

== Personal life ==
Reilly's brother, Travis Reilly, is in the Long Island hardcore punk band This Is Hell.

In November 2009 Brandon married his wife Daniela Duff. Together they reside in Tarrytown, New York.

The band announced via their Facebook page that Brandon's wife gave birth to baby boy, Holden ArthurLee Reilly, on June 16, 2011, and another son, Somerset Odell Reilly was born on January 15, 2015.
