= Larry Gorman =

American drummer

Larry Gorman (born May 9, 1972, in Astoria, Queens) is a rock drummer.

Gorman has played in numerous hardcore punk, post-hardcore, and alternative rock bands, including Reach Out, voice, Direct, Fountainhead, Orange 9mm, A Day for Honey, Glassjaw, Head Automatica, Freshkills, and Beyond.

He was also the drummer for New York City dream pop band Asobi Seksu from 2009 until their end in 2013. Asobi Seksu played their final show opening for Slowdive on October 26, 2014.
