= Head Automatica =

American rock band

- Origin: Brooklyn, New York, U.S.
- Genres: Indie rock; alternative rock; pop rock; power pop; dance punk
- Years active: 2003–2012; 2023–present
- Label: Warner Bros.
- Spinoff of: Glassjaw
- Members: Daryl Palumbo; Craig Bonich; Rick Penzone; Chad Hasty
- Past members: Jessie Nelson; Steven Heet; Jim Greer; Vinnie Caruana; Brandon Arnovick; Dan the Automator; Larry Gorman; Brandon Reid; Sammy Siegler; Jarvis Holden; Craig Bonich; Guy Licata

Head Automatica is an American rock band from Brooklyn, New York fronted by Glassjaw frontman Daryl Palumbo.

== History ==
=== Formation, Decadance and Popaganda (2003–2006) ===
The beginnings of the band stemmed from singer Daryl Palumbo's interests in the hip hop and Britpop genres. Palumbo felt that the material that was inspired by these genres did not fit into Glassjaw's spectrum and so Head Automatica was created to showcase this.

The band's debut album, Decadence, was released August 17, 2004. Charting on the Billboard 200 and Top Heatseekers charts, the album was the brainchild of Palumbo, who was known better for his work in post-hardcore music, and Dan 'The Automator' Nakamura, famous for his production work with groups including Gorillaz and Handsome Boy Modeling School. The two allegedly met at a party and worked on what later became the album. Palumbo then recruited the other current members as a touring group, and toured the United States, playing with bands such as Interpol, The Rapture, The Used and The Cure.

The band released their second album, entitled Popaganda, on June 6, 2006. This album was produced by Howard Benson, who had already worked with Head Automatica on several tracks from Decadence. With the departure of Nakamura, the band took a more organic, classic power-pop approach citing Squeeze and Elvis Costello as influences.

In 2006, the band toured with Avenged Sevenfold and Coheed and Cambria, and joined Taking Back Sunday, Angels & Airwaves, and The Subways for a month of touring on June 22. In October 2006, drummer and founding member Larry Gorman was fired from the band for undisclosed reasons, with Brandon Reid being announced as his replacement. The band scheduled a headlining fall tour with Rock Kills Kid, but chose to cancel it after playing only a few dates. Instead, they supported Thirty Seconds to Mars on their Welcome to the Universe Tour along with The Receiving End of Sirens, Cobra Starship, and Rock Kills Kid. In early 2007, Head Automatica played direct support on The West Coast Winter Tour with Jack's Mannequin, We Are The Fury, and The Audition. The band visited the UK for the first time for a headlining tour that started at Southampton University on May 23, 2007, and performed at Rock Am Ring festival in Nürburg, Germany on June 1. August 2007 saw yet another change in the line up, with New York hardcore veteran Sammy Siegler taking over the drum kit.

=== Swan Damage and disbandment (2007–2012) ===
Head Automatica started pre-production on their third album in late September 2007, aiming for a "darker" sound and "grimy, dancefloor-friendly" songs. The band recorded half of the material with producer Jason Lader and the other with The Brothers (the production team of Josh Topolsky and Eric Emm). Sammy Siegler handled the drumming duties, and Albert Wing, Bruce Fowler and Gary Grant recorded the brass section. The band appeared in a Christmas-themed skit on The Tonight Show with Jay Leno on December 18, 2008 and went on a short North American tour with Radio 4 in January 2009. They appeared at the 2009 South by Southwest music conference. In May 2009, Palumbo confirmed that they had finished recording their next album, entitled Swan Damage. In an interview with Revolt online magazine Palumbo stated that the record "captures everything we ever intended Head Automatica to be. It covers the genre spectrum; there are powerful clubby tracks, garage-pop tracks, and body-rocking tracks. This album really reflects the full spectrum of music this band is capable of playing.” The band have been performing songs from Swan Damage live, working titles including "Can't Stand Amadeus", "End of Heat", "Too Ashamed", "Face Upon the Floor", "Spitzer", "Sega", "It's a Lie" and "Hard as Mud".

In July 2009 Head Automatica played a string of US dates with Cubic Zirconia. The same month, Warner Bros. shelved the album, and the band went missing from the public eye for more than a year, with no announcements regarding Swan Damage. The band re-emerged with a new rhythm section of drummer Guy Licata (Cold Cave, Hercules & Love Affair) and bassist Rick Penzone (Men, Women & Children) to perform at the Music Hall of Williamsburg in Brooklyn, New York on October 20, 2010. On October 21, 2010 Palumbo tweeted a link to the Cubic Zirconia remix of the still-to-be-released track "Can't Stand Amadeus".

In late 2009, Palumbo and Head Automatica parted ways with Warner Bros. Records due to creative differences, taking the album's master tapes with him. The album was effectively shelved after Palumbo left the label due to disputes with Warner Bros., but in 2012, he expressed hope that the album would be released "soon". However, in a 2020 interview with Alternative Press, Palumbo expressed disinterest in releasing Swan Damage, citing its unfinished/unmastered state. It has never been leaked.

In August 2012 Head Automatica toured the UK as a four-piece, performing material from Swan Damage and new versions of songs from their first two records. Later the same year, Palumbo and Rick Penzone began writing new music together, which both members felt was not appropriate for use with Head Automatica, leading to the formation of the band Color Film.

=== Reunion (2023) ===
In mid-December 2022, it was announced that Head Automatica would play the Furnace Fest in September 2023. A month later, it was revealed that Head Automatica would be playing at the Sad Summer Festival in July 2023.

On May 17, 2024, the band released a new single called "Bear The Cross", which marks the band's first release of new material since 2006.

== Band members ==
Current members

- Daryl Palumbo — lead vocals (2003–2012, 2023-present)
- Craig Bonich — guitars (2003–2010, 2023-present)
- Richard "Rick" Penzone — bass (2010–2012, 2023-present), guitars (2010–2012)
- Chad Hasty – drums (2023–present)

Former members

- Jessie Nelson — keyboards (2005–2012)
- Steven Heet — drums (2012)
- Vinnie Caruana — guitars (2003)
- Brandon Arnovick — guitars (2003–2004)
- Josh "Jarvis" Holden — bass (2003–2009)
- Larry Gorman — drums (2003–2006)
- Brandon Reid — drums (2006–2007)
- Sammy Siegler — drums (2007–2009)
- Guy Licata — drums (2010)
- Jim Greer — keyboards (2003–2004)
- Dan Nakamura — turntables, production (2003–2004)

Timeline

== Discography ==
=== Albums ===
Year	Album details	US	UK
2004	Decadence: Released: 17 August 2004; Label: Warner Bros.; Format: CD, LP	169	125
2006	Popaganda: Released: 6 June 2006; Label: Warner Bros.; Format: CD, LP	69	87

=== Unreleased ===
- The Vipen Sessions/Bang! Hon Out! Sessions (2005, Popaganda pre-production)
- Decadence (May 2004 Production Disc)
- Tokyo Decadence (February 2004 Production Disc)
- Westworld (Demo) (2003)
- Rough Demo (Demo) (2003)
- Swan Damage

=== EPs ===
- Beating Heart Baby EP (iTunes Download) (Import) – Warner Bros. Records – 2005
- Beating Heart Baby (remix CD/digital release) – Warner Bros. Records – 2005/2006
- Pop Rocks EP (iTunes Download) – Warner Bros. Records – 2006

=== Singles ===
- "Brooklyn Is Burning"
- "Beating Heart Baby" – UK No. 44
- "At the Speed of a Yellow Bullet"
- "Please Please Please (Young Hollywood)"
- "Graduation Day"
- "Lying Through Your Teeth"
- "Annulment"

=== Music videos ===
- "Brooklyn Is Burning" (2004)
- "Beating Heart Baby" (2005)
- "The Razor" (2005?) (unreleased, unfinished edit can be found on YouTube)
- "Beating Heart Baby" (Chris Lord-Alge mix) (2006)
- "Graduation Day" (2006)
- "Lying Through Your Teeth" (2006)
