= Vinnie Caruana =

American singer (born 1979)

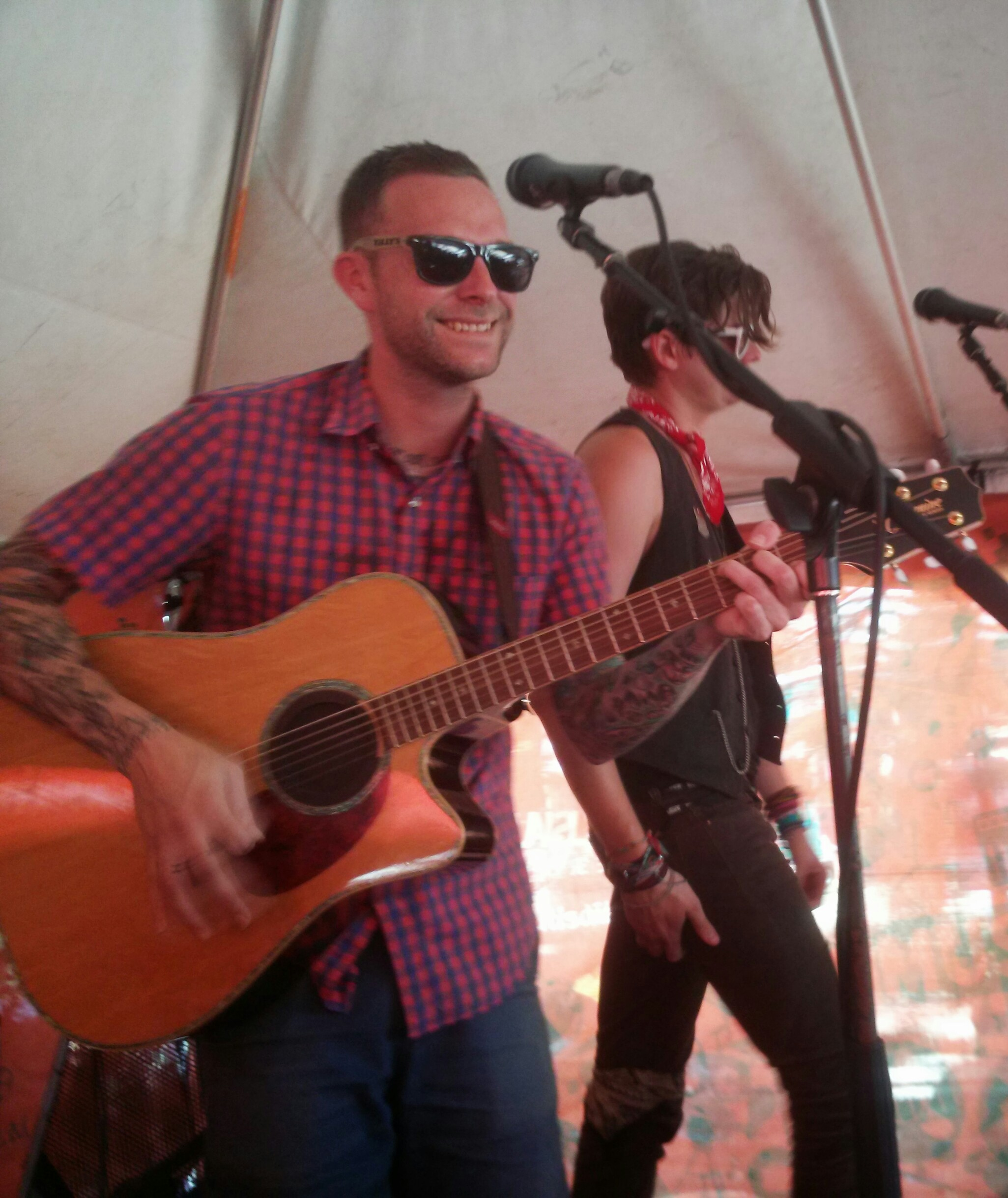
- Vinnie Caruana (with William Beckett of The Academy Is...) performing at the Vans Warped Tour's Acoustic Basement tent in Dallas, TX – August 1, 2013

Background information
- Born: September 25, 1979 (age 47)
- Genres: Punk rock, pop punk, melodic hardcore, indie rock, post-hardcore, emo
- Occupations: Singer, songwriter, musician
- Instruments: Vocals, guitars
- Label: Big Scary Monsters

Vinnie Caruana (born September 25, 1979) is an American singer. He is the vocalist for Long Island punk band The Movielife and lead singer/songwriter for the indie/punk rock band I Am the Avalanche.

== Music career ==
=== The Movielife ===
The Movielife is a Long Island melodic hardcore band, composed of vocalist Vinnie Caruana, bassist Phil Navetta, guitarist Brandon Reilly, drummer Evan Baken, and guitarist Alex Amiruddin, until 2001 when Alex Amiruddin left and was replaced by Dan Navetta. The band was active from 1997 to 2003 with brief reunion shows from 2010 to 2011. The Movielife released three EPs and two full-length albums before disbanding. At the 2008 Bamboozle, Caruana was joined by the members of Set Your Goals to perform a set of The Movielife songs.

In 2015, The Movielife played two reunion shows at Irving Plaza to start a reunion tour.

=== I Am The Avalanche ===
I Am the Avalanche is a Brooklyn-based Punk rock band which features Vinnie Caruana on vocals. I Am the Avalanche are a part of Cardboard City, a New York-based group of bands and artists led by Vin's best friend Daryl Palumbo (Glassjaw, Head Automatica, House of Blow) and DJ Krazyglue. I Am the Avalanche's first album was produced by Barett Jones (Foo Fighters, The Melvins).

=== Peace'd Out ===
Peace'd Out is a Los Angeles-based Hardcore band which features Vinnie Caruana on vocals, guitarist Steve Choi (RX Bandits), bassist Roger Camero (No Motiv), and drummer Casey Deitz (The Velvet Teen). Choi began writing for this project in 2007. The group released a five-song EP, Peace'd Out EP, in 2012. The song "Baadering Raam" is about the 1989 Hillsborough disaster.

=== Solo artist ===
Caruana routinely performs in New York City in a solo role having played numerous tours. Vinnie released his debut solo EP early 2013 through I Surrender / Run For Cover Records. Caruana will take part of the Acoustic Basement Tour which Thursday vocalist Geoff Rickly, A Loss For Words, and Koyo.

In 2014 Caruana provided the song "It's Been Way Too Long" to the soundtrack of the Jason Michael Brescia film Bridge and Tunnel.

On December 7, 2015, Caruana announced that he had signed to Equal Vision Records and had started recording his next full-length album, to be released in 2016. Caruana released his solo album Aging Frontman on October 4, 2019.

=== Constant Elevation ===
Caruana is the lead vocalist for the hardcore band, Constant Elevation, which includes longtime New York Hardcore drummer, Sammy Siegler.

== Guest appearances ==
Year	Album title	Band	Record label	Credits
2002	Living Well Is the Best Revenge	Midtown	Drive-Thru Records	Vocals on "Find Comfort in Yourself"
2007	The Walking Wounded	Bayside	Victory Records	Vocals on "The Walking Wounded"
2009	This Will Be the Death of Us	Set Your Goals	Epitaph Records	Vocals on "This Will Be the Death of Us"
2014	Die on Stage	Hostage Calm	Run For Cover Records	Vocals on "Raised"
2023	Not Through Blood	Pain of Truth	DAZE	Vocals on "Out Of Our Hands" as The Movielife
2023	Would You Miss It?	Koyo	Pure Noise Records	Vocals on "What's Left to Say"
2023	Serenity	Sharkswimmer	Really Rad Records	Vocals on "Smile Lines"
2023	Give Me Mercy	All Hallowed	Poptek Records	Vocals on "LUST"
