= The Movielife =

American punk rock band

Background information
- Origin: Long Island, New York; United States
- Genres: Melodic hardcore; punk rock; pop-punk; emo
- Years active: 1997–2003; 2010-2011; 2014–present
- Labels: Fadeaway; Revelation; Drive-Thru; MCA; Rise; One Day Savior
- Members: Vinnie Caruana; Brandon Reilly; Brett Romnes
- Past members: Eddie Reyes; Dave O'Connell; Nick Ghanbarian; Alex Amiruddin; Dan Navetta; Phil Navetta; Evan Baken
- Website: Official website

The Movielife is a Long Island punk rock band composed of vocalist Vinnie Caruana, guitarist Brandon Reilly, and drummer Brett Romnes. The band originally formed in 1997 and disbanded in 2003, but announced their official reunion in December 2014.

== History ==
=== Formation and first two albums (1997–2001) ===
The Movielife formed in 1997 in Long Island, New York with vocalist Vinnie Caruana, guitarists Alex Amiruddin and Eddie Reyes, bassist Nick Ghanbarian and drummer Evan Baken. The band recorded a tape titled Red Demo with Mike Sapone. Reyes left the group to form Runner Up and subsequently Taking Back Sunday. He was replaced by Dave O'Connell, who in turn would leave shortly afterwards to form the Quick Fix Kills, subsequently being replaced by Brandon Reilly. Reilly was the guitarist of the Levittown band the Rookie Lot, which featured three members of what would eventually become Brand New.

Ghanbarian then left the group and was replaced by Phil Navetta. Ghanbarian would later join Bayside. In 1998, the band recorded another demo tape, titled the White Demo. The demo caught the attention of Fadeway Records, with whom the band signed a one-album contract. The band recorded their debut album with Peng Chia at Tin Pan Alley Studios.

It's Go Time was released through Fadeaway Records in September 1999 and was supported by heavy touring. With the band's growing popularity, they almost signed with Equal Vision Records, however they instead signed with Revelation Records. The band recorded their second album with producer Brian McTernan at Salad Days Studio in Washington, DC. This Time Next Year was released through Revelation Records in October 2000. In February 2001, while touring with Reach the Sky and Bane, the Movielife were involved in a van accident, which resulted in them dropping off the tour. In April 2001, the group went on tour with Glassjaw, New Found Glory and Autopilot Off. In July and August, the band supported Reel Big Fish and Goldfinger on their co-headlining tour of the U.S.

=== Drive-Thru Records era and break-up (2001–2004) ===
Shortly afterwards, it was reported that the band had signed to Drive-Thru Records. A proposed September 2001 tour with Finch and the Starting Line was cancelled following the September 11 attacks. Instead, the Movielife supported Reel Big Fish and Goldfinger again for a handful of shows in September and October 2001. They released the EP Has a Gambling Problem EP in November 2001. The band ended the year supporting Good Charlotte and H_{2}O. In January and February 2002, the band supported the Mighty Mighty Bosstones on their headlining east coast US tour. On March 30, it was reported that Amiruddin left the band; he went on to start Keep Breathing. Amiruddin explained that he "grew disenchanted with the new direction of the music, and my friendships with the other guys in the band suffered for various reasons". He was replaced by Dan Navetta, Phil's younger brother. In April and May 2002, the group supported Face to Face on their headlining US tour; the trek included an appearance at Skate and Surf Fest. In May and June 2002, the band toured Europe as part of the Deconstruction Tour. Between late June and mid-August, the group went on Warped Tour. Between October and December, the group went on a US tour with Brand New, the Reunion Show, and Orange Island.

In 2003, Forty Hour Train Back to Penn was released, and reached number 164 on the Billboard 200. In February 2003, the band supported The Used on their headlining tour of the US East Coast. Following this, the group went on tour with Finch and Senses Fail until early March. In April, Baken got in a van accident, which resulted in the band drafting a friend in to temporarily fill his role in time for a UK tour. In May, the band filmed a video for "Jamestown" directed by Motion graphics company Digital Kitchen. The band went on The Made Tour, which ran from June to August; they played alongside Further Seems Forever, Autopilot Off, and Anberlin. The trek included an appearance at Hellfest. In September 2003, the band went on the 5 Dollar Tour, with Fairweather and the Honorary Title. On September 29, a note on the band's website revealed that the Movielife had decided to break up.

=== Reunions and other bands (2004–present) ===
Reilly and Caruana reunited for a one-off acoustic performance of Movielife songs in December 2004. Most of the members of the Movielife formed other bands; Caruana formed I Am the Avalanche, Reilly formed Nightmare of You, in which Phil Navetta also played briefly, but has since left and currently resides in Queens, NY. Dan Navetta founded Heavy Rescue and a media company, while Baken worked in business management. In 2011, Amiruddin joined Wiretap Crash. Other members went on to form South Shore United alongside members of Halfway to Hell Club.

In 2008, Caruana performed a set of the Movielife with Set Your Goals backing at The Bamboozle festival. On December 16, 2010, a video was posted on Caruana's YouTube account featuring himself and Reilly, announcing that the Movielife will be playing at The Bamboozle in New Jersey, marking their first performance in almost 8 years. They followed this up with a show in New York in August. Caruana remarked in 2015 the group had planned to continue, however, he "[didn't] think [he] was ready. I don't think Brandon was ready. The timing was wrong -- we were trying to force it, but our lives weren't there yet".

Caruana and Reilly re-connected as friends and shortly afterwards began talking about a potential the Movielife reunion. The band subsequently began rehearsing in December 2014, performing their first shows since 2011 in New York City at Irving Plaza in February 2015. Asked whether a new album would be released, Caruana said he would "never rule that out". The Movielife performed several additional shows in the US later in the year, including an appearance at Today's Mixtape Festival, as well as a tour of the UK in June. In March 2016, Caruana revealed that the band were in the process of writing new material. The following month, the band released "Future Feeling (Afraid of Drugs)" as a single. In 2017, the group performed at Slam Dunk Festival in the UK. All promotional materials posted to the band's Twitter after the 2016 Presidential election feature only Brett Romnes, Brandon and Vinnie, implying they are the only current members of the band. The band's fourth album, Cities in Search of a Heart was released in September 2017 through Rise Records. In May and June 2018, the band supported New Found Glory on their Sick Tour in the US.

In February 2022, when asked by the Podioslave Podcast about what's next for The Movielife, Caruana said, "I wouldn't be surprised if there was more Movielife music. Brandon's just got to write it. I don't think I should be writing it."

== Members ==
Current lineup

- Vinnie Caruana – lead vocals (1997–2003, 2011, 2014–present)
- Brandon Reilly – guitar (1997–2003, 2011, 2014–present)
- Brett Romnes – drums (2016–present)

Touring members

- Matt Fazzi – bass guitar, vocals (2017–present)
- Chris Regan – guitar, vocals (2017–present)

Past members

- Eddie Reyes – guitar (1997)
- Dave O'Connell – guitar (1997)
- Nick Ghanbarian – bass (1997)
- Alex Amiruddin – guitar (1997–2001)
- Phil Navetta – bass (1997–2003, 2011, 2014–2016)
- Dan Navetta – guitar (2001–2003, 2011, 2014–2016)
- Evan Baken – drums (1997–2003, 2011, 2014–2016)

== Discography ==
Studio albums

- It's Go Time (1999)
- This Time Next Year (2000)
- Forty Hour Train Back to Penn (2003)
- Cities in Search of a Heart (2017)
