= The Narrative discography =

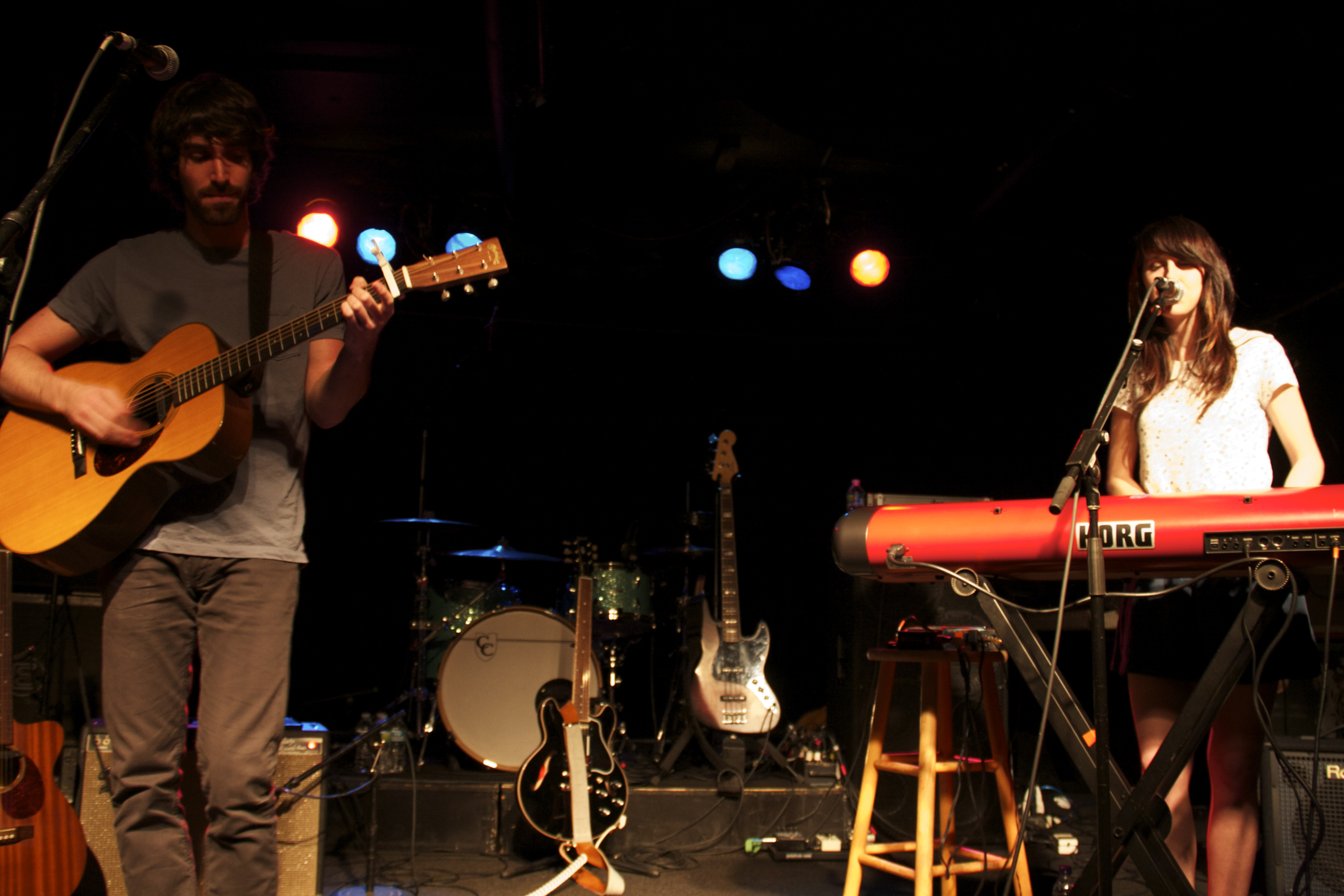
- Studio albums: 2
- EPs: 4
- Music videos: 1

The discography of the Narrative, an American indie pop band from Long Island, New York, that have recorded one studio album, three extended plays and one b-side album. The band first got together after Suzie Zeldin answered a Craigslist ad put up by Jesse Gabriel in 2006.

They soon found out that they were studying in the same school on Bellmore, Long Island, but never met. So after the answer of Suzie, they discovered they shared the same passion for music. The two collaborated on music, first forming the short-lived project January Window spending the next couple of years (2006–2007) in Suzie's cramped Upper West Side apartment crafting songs for their first EP. And officially formed the Narrative in 2008 releasing the debut EP Just Say Yes.

In 2010 they released the debut album The Narrative. Charles Seich joined the group in 2008 and in 2010 became a band member, until 2011 when he left. The band release their b-side album, B-Sides and Seasides in 2012 for promote the recording of a second full length. The Narrative's next album Golden Silence was released on December 2, 2016.

== Studio albums ==
Title	Album details
The Narrative	Released: July 26, 2010; Label: The Record Collective; Formats: CD, digital download, 12-inch vinyl
Golden Silence	Released: December 2, 2016; Formats: CD, digital download

== EPs ==
Title	Album details
Just Say Yes	Released: August 30, 2008; Self Release
Nothing Without You	Released: March 16 – 31; Self Released Tour EP
Kickstarter	Released: March 24, 2011; Self Released Tour EP
B-Sides and Seasides	Released: February 4, 2012; Compilation B-Side

== Music videos ==
Title	Year	Director
"Chasing a Feeling"	2014	Sean O'kane
