= List of songs recorded by the Narrative =

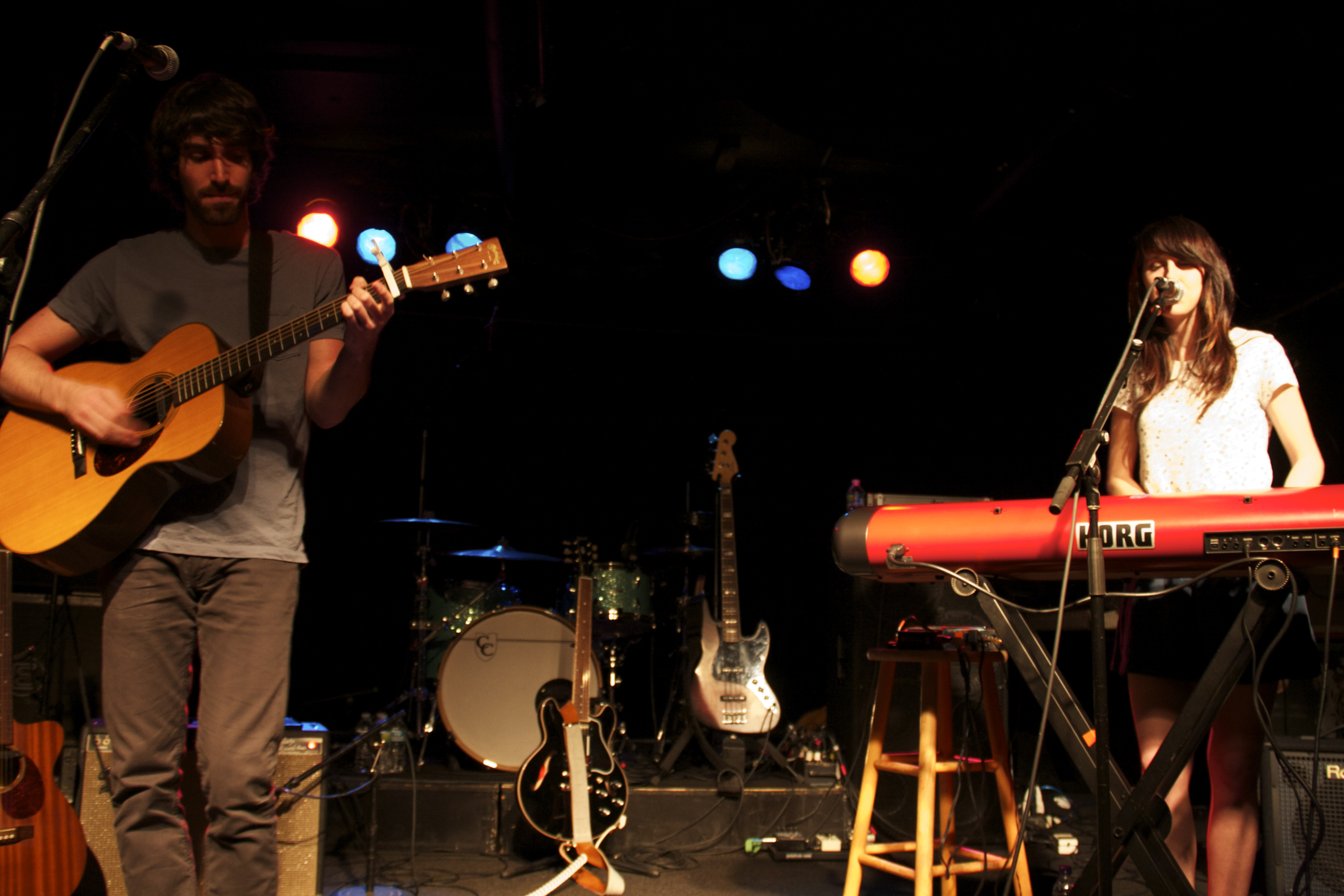
The Narrative in 2011

The following is a list of songs by the American indie pop band the Narrative that have recorded one studio album, three extended plays and one b-side album. The band first got together after Suzie Zeldin answered a Craigslist ad put up by Jesse Gabriel in 2006.

They soon found out that they were studying in the same school on Bellmore, Long Island, but never met. So after the answer of Suzie, they discovered they shared the same passion for music. The two collaborated on music, first forming the short-lived project January Window spending the next couple of years (2006–2007) in Suzie's cramped Upper West Side apartment crafting songs for their first EP. And officially formed The Narrative on 2008 releasing the debut EP Just Say Yes.

In 2010 they released the debut album The Narrative. Charles Seich joined the group on 2008 and in 2010 became a band member, until 2011 when he left. The band release their b-side album, B-Sides and Seasides in 2012 to promote the recording of a second full-length. On June 3, 2014, the band released their single "Chasing a Feeling". Their second studio album Golden Silence was released December 2, 2016.

== Songs ==
Key
†	Indicates single release
#	Indicates promotional single release

Song	Year	Release(s)	Length	Notes	Ref.
"Already Changed"	2016	Golden Silence	4:29		
"California Sun"	2016	Golden Silence	5:07		
"Castling"	2008	Just Say Yes	4:19	Released in acoustic version at B-Sides and Seasides Compilation	
"Chasing a Feeling" †	2014	Chasing a Feeling, Golden Silence	4:33	First single and music video release	
"Cherry Red"	2010	The Narrative	4:11		
"Don't Want to Fall"	2010	The Narrative	3:22		
"Empty Space"	2010	The Narrative	4:24		
"End All"	2010	The Narrative	4:12		
"Eyes Closed"	2008	Just Say Yes	4:30		
"Fade"	2011	The Narrative	3:31	Released in demo version at Nothing Without You EP; Alternate version at B-Sides and Seasides; Featured in the movie "The Chateau Merroux"	
"Hallelujah" #	2012	B-Sides and Seasides	4:23	Released in 2014 Compilation "Friends" of Fadeaway Records	
"Hard to Keep Your Cool"	2010	The Narrative	2:44		
"Heart of Gold"	2013	Songs for Justice	3:22	Neil Young Cover; Released in compilation "Songs For Justice" by Rock For Justice for charity.	
"Home"	2016	Golden Silence	4:12		
"I Can Make a Mess"	2016	Golden Silence	5:07		
"I've Been Thinking"	2010	The Narrative	4:44		
"Karma Police"	2012	B-Sides and Seasides	4:17	Radiohead Cover	
"Libra"	2008	Just Say Yes	5:25	Featured on MTV TV Show	
"Little Boys Break Hearts"	2022	Single	3:06		
"Make It Right"	2012	B-Sides and Seasides	3:48		
"Monoliths"	2021	Single	3:45		
"Moving Out" #	2016	Golden Silence	4:14		
"New Anxieties"	2023	Single	3:30		
"Oklahoma Air"	2016	Golden Silence	4:35		
"Reason to Leave"	2016	Golden Silence	3:22		
"Silence & Sirens"	2010	The Narrative	3:56	Released in acoustic version at B-Sides and Seasides	
"Suburbs"	2016	Golden Silence	6:07		
"Starving For Attention"	2010	The Narrative	4:39		
"Tautou"	2012	B-Sides and Seasides	4:19	Brand New Cover	
"Toe the Line" #	2016	Golden Silence	4:14	-	
"The Moment That It Stops"	2008	Just Say Yes	4:56	Featured in MTV TV Shows	
"The Photographer's Daughter"	2008	Just Say Yes	3:49		
"Trains"	2010	The Narrative	3:28		
"Turncoat"	2010	The Narrative	4:20		
"Waiting Room"	2008	Just Say Yes	4:18	Featured in MTV TV Show	
"Winter's Coming"	2010	The Narrative	5:00	Released in acoustic version at B-Sides and Seasides; Released in "Yuletides & Stage Dives", compilation by Keep A Breast.	
"You Will Be Mine"	2010	The Narrative	4:11	Released in acoustic version at B-Sides and Seasides	
