= Twin Forks =

Twin Forks may refer to:

- Twin Forks, New Mexico
- Twin Forks (band), an American folk rock band
  - Twin Forks (album)
  - Twin Forks (EP)
