= The Narrative =

American indie rock band

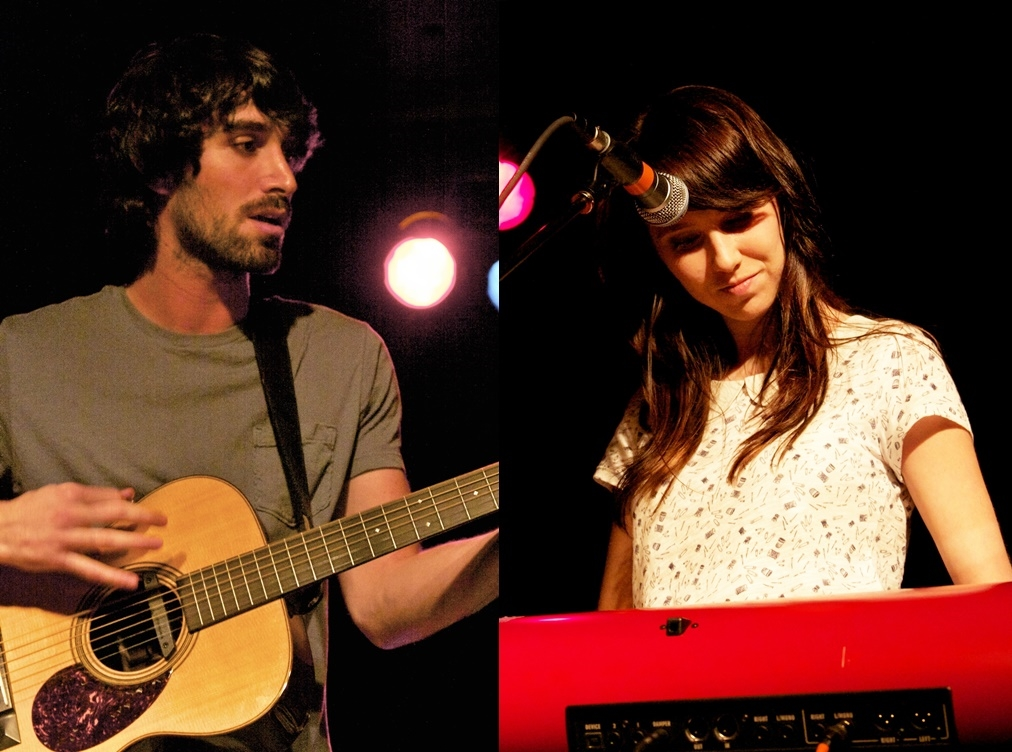
- The Narrative (Jesse Gabriel and Suzie Zeldin) in 2011

Background information
- Origin: Long Island, New York, U.S.
- Genres: Indie rock; indie pop; soft rock
- Years active: 2007–present
- Members: Jesse Gabriel; Suzie Zeldin
- Past members: Charlie Seich
- Website: www.thenarrativemusic.com

The Narrative (or Narrative) is an American independent indie rock band from Long Island, New York, formed in 2007. They are currently based in Nashville, Tennessee. Since 2011, the band has consisted of Suzie Zeldin (vocals, keyboards) and Jesse Gabriel (vocals, guitar). Previously, the group featured the drummer Charlie Seich. The group started its musical career with their debut EP Just Say Yes, released in 2008, where "Eyes Closed" stands out as the most popular song with more than four million views on YouTube. Its debut album The Narrative was released in 2010. As well the group release two supporting tour-EP, Nothing Without You in 2010 and Kickstarter EP in 2011. A follow-up EP b-side compilation album, B-Sides and Seasides was released online in 2012. The Narrative released its second studio album, Golden Silence, on December 2, 2016.

== History ==
=== 2006–08: Formation ===
In 2006, after graduating, Jesse Gabriel decided to find some musicians to begin a musical project. He wrote a three-page open advertisement and submitted it to Craigslist. After some answers, he looked saw Suzie Zeldin's response, who was also looking for musicians to form a band, and they decided to meet. They found that they had studied in the same school on Bellmore, Long Island, but never met. The two decided to collaborate in music, around October 2006, naming the band "January Window", before changing it to the Narrative. Zeldin spoke to U-T San Diego, explaining the following about the change of band name, "We came up with the name while we were recording the 'Just Say Yes' EP. At one point, we had put together a list of random band names, mostly from literary terms, poems, or song lyrics we liked and sent them around to our friends. For a short time, we settled on January Window which is from a Sylvia Plath poem. We ended up not liking it after a while and revisited the list and found The Narrative Paradigm which seemed a little wordy and pretentious so we shortened it to The Narrative. We decided it was a good name and have been happy with it."

The band's first song released was the demo version of "End All Arrival", under the name January Window on January 1, 2007, on MySpace, which was later used on their debut album. Jesse would not sing in the band initially, but Suzie asked him and he decided to sing "Slide" by the Goo Goo Dolls. Following this "audition", Suzie was pleased by his voice and Jesse was thus included in the lead vocals and the back vocals. Drummer Charles Seich was added to the band after being introduced to Jesse and Suzie for the purposes of recording their EP.

In 2007, Suzie participated in many band projects, singing in Russian on "I'm Breathing... Are You Breathing Too?" by Envy on the Coast, Fairmont's song "Melt Your Heart" from the album Transcendence, and The Minus Scale's song "No Matter What I Say You're Going To Do It". She also sang guest vocals on the Dashboard Confessional side of the New Found Glory split EP Swiss Army Bromance song "All About Her", as well as on at least one track on the newest edition of the released Dashboard Confessionals, Wire Tapes Vol 2. Before the Narrative she also released solo material, such as the Excuses EP, featuring four songs.

=== 2008: Just Say Yes ===
"Eyes Closed"
"Eyes Closed" taken from the band's EP Just Say Yes features the male-female vocals combination that brings attention to their music.

The Narrative spent the next couple years (2007–08) on Zeldin's cramped Upper West Side apartment writing songs to their first EP entitled Just Say Yes. The production of Just Say Yes was made without a big idea; Jesse explains, "we're really just excited about recording the songs we worked on." The EP was produced by Bryan Russell, who gave to the group a directional help on developing its sounds, influenced by bands as Death Cab for Cutie and Jimmy Eat World. Just Say Yes was released independently on August 30, 2008.

Since its release, the band received two large promotions, when Myspace Canada featured the full EP for streaming on the website's front page. Through the years and late 2011–2012, songs from Just Say Yes were featured on episodes of MTV's reality TV shows: Real World: Brooklyn and Real World: Cancun, Jersey Shore, Savage U, TV shows on MTV2, MTV's Canada Peak Season as well on VH-1, Nickelodeon's TeenNick series Gigantic, National Geographic and Starz. They also received an unsigned showcase on Absolutepunk.net, Friends or Enemies Unsigned VIP Band and named in the AbsolutePunk Top 100. On May 1, 2009, the band announced via Facebook that they would have a short tour with Destry to support the EP, in June staying within northeastern America. The East Coast tour started on June 18 to 28.

=== 2010–11: Debut album: The Narrative ===
In 2009, The Narrative began to record their debut album, entitled The Narrative. The band recorded the self-titled with the same producer of their debut EP, Bryan Russell on his studio Red Wire Audio in New York. Different from their first release, production of The Narrative took an original direction, "We're not looking to sound like anything or anyone else. We might say, "Hey, this part reminds me of this song. Maybe we can take it in that sort of a direction and it'd be cool, but we never start out trying to write a song like one that has already been written," explained Jesse. Without a bassist member, the group called their friend Ari Sadowitz to be the studio bassist for the album.

On July 23, the Narrative premiered the song "Silence and Sirens" in an acoustic version on the program of WOOD-TV West Vibe Eight West. The Narrative was officially released on July 27, 2010, through the project "The Record Collective". On July 29, the band premiered the album live on a show at Gramercy Theater with Relient K and the Gay Blades.

The album was featured on the front page of MySpace U.S and PureVolume.com who declared them one of the "Top Unsigned Bands of 2010", The American Creative Top 20 Albums as well featured in the national campaign, launched by Propellerhead Software and leading A&R consulting agency Room 64, "RM64 Artists Record". The band has been touring nationally with Eisley, Relient K, Mae, including CMJ playing in the Big Picture Media showcase and SXSW showcases during the year supporting the self-titled. In September 2010, they were a featured band in the Alternative Press article "Unsigned Bands, AP Wants You!", stylized as AP&R in the issue No. 267. On June 1, 2011, they appeared live on Fox 5 San Diego, while touring with Eisley, featuring a small interview and also performing the acoustic version of "You Will Be Mine".

The band parted ways with their drummer Charlie in early 2011, later explaining that he left the band due to the financial difficulties of the band's expenses on the Eisley tour and personal needs. The Narrative then brought out touring drummer and Long Island native Jay Scalchunes to help them complete a five-week stint of the Vans Warped Tour, playing on Kevin Says Stage from July 19 to August 14, 2011. On October 19, 2011, the Narrative made another showcase at the CMJ Marathon on Sullivan Hall. The Narrative's song "Fade" was featured in the soundtrack of the film produced by Bob Fugger, The Chateau Meroux, released in 2012.

=== 2012–2016: B-Sides and Seasides and Golden Silence ===
On March 26, 2012, it was announced that the band had started work on their second studio album titled Golden Silence. The album was produced by Bryan Russell and Justin Long and recorded in an English cathedral barn, built in 1900, in Upstate New York. Zeldin said that the band took a new direction with the album, "We do feel like the [...] songs we recorded are more mature than our previous releases" she explains "We feel much more confident in the kind of music we want to make". The band was helped by Jay Scalchunes to be the session drummer and Ari Sadowitz the bassist for the recordings of the album.

To support the album production, the Narrative released through digital download their b-side compilation album B-Sides and Seasides on April 4, 2012. The b-side features acoustic versions of the album The Narrative and Just Say Yes, and also two new songs "Hallelujah", and "Make It Right". It also features covers of Radiohead, "Karma Police" and from Brand New, "Tautou". These songs were produced for the tour EP Kickstarter, supporting the band's 2011 Spring Tour; the campaign on Kickstarter raised about $8,500. Some acoustic songs were also released on the support tour EP Nothing Without You.

On July 18, Jesse posted a note about the new album on Tumblr, where he talked about the desired release date in the same year and the difficulties from its releases. On November 25, Z100 started they annual contest "Z100 Hometown Hero". The Narrative was nominated with twenty-seven other musicians for one-month competition of "demands" through Eventful. The band stayed in the second step the contest with five, and won the 2º place.

In 2013, Suzie Zeldin joined the folk/Americana project Twin Forks created by Chris Carrabba when he was recording the solo album Covered in the Flood. The group first formation consisted in Chris Carrabba, Suzie Zeldin, Jonathan Clark and Ben Homola from Bad Books. The band debut happened on the SXSW 2013. While Suzie went on tour with Twin Forks, Jesse recorded in the beginning of 2014 a solo project with Bryan Russell titled Here, Sit, Stay, released on October 22, through digital download.

On January 27, 2014, the band re-issued the EP Just Say Yes through VIDA Records and (주)프로시마뮤직엔터테인먼트 (Prossima Music Entertainment Co., LTD) in South Korea.

On February 15, 2014, it was announced that the lead single from Golden Silence, titled "Chasing a Feeling", would be released online on June 3, 2014. The accompanying music video was premiered on July 28, 2014, on Idolator. On January 12, 2016, The Narrative released the promotional single titled "Moving Out" through digital download. Following, "Toe the Line" also as promotional single, was released on January 27, 2016. On October 28, 2016, The Narrative premiered its last single "California Sun", announcing the album release date. Golden Silence was released on December 2, 2016, independently by the band through digital download.

=== 2021–present: Folk singles and New Anxieties EP ===
On February 3, 2021, after five years on hiatus, the Narrative announced via Twitter the upcoming releases of new songs through the year. On May 20, the band announced their first song since the release of Golden Silence, titled "Monoliths". The song was released through digital download and stream on July 14, 2021. Gabriel stated about the song as being "a reflection on the state of humanity and our lack of respect for our planet and fragile existence." The process of writing the song started in around 2017, according to Gabriel, after moving to Nashville. The band finished the song in 2021, recording the song separated due to Covid-19, said Zeldin. The song was produced by Bryan Russell and recorded at Red Wire Records. With the production teased through social media over 2021, the band released on October 14, 2022, the song "Little Boys Break Hearts". The acoustic song was inspired by Zeldin's sister's past relationship story.

On August 25, 2023, the Narrative released their song "New Anxieties", part of a four-song EP with the same name, expected in 2024, on which the band started working shortly after the 2022 releases.

== Style and influences ==
The Narrative are most often described as indie pop and pop rock, featuring combined male-female vocals. The Narrative has expressed appreciation for Death Cab for Cutie, Brand New, the Academy Is..., Counting Crows, Destry as the indie/folk of Bon Iver. Suzie have influences of ska, punk and emo and Jesse, the sound of hip-hop and 1960s rock. On their first EP release, the band used samples from Death Cab for Cutie's "Company Calls" on their song "The Moment That It Stops". For their second album release, the band explored the synthpop and the contemporary pop music, utilizing mixing synthesizers, ambient elements, and orchestral instruments. The Narrative's last release explores the folk and world music.

== Social support ==
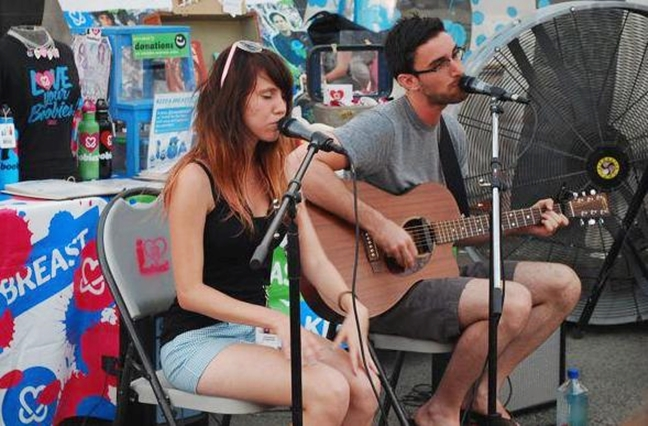
The Narrative performing on Keep A Breast Foundation's "Imagine If There Was No Cancer" Act at Vans Warped Tour in 2011

On December 5, 2012, the Narrative was featured in the Christmas compilation Yuletides & Stage Dives released by the Catalyst Publicity Group and Keep a Breast Foundation, with other 40 artists to fight against the breast cancer. Its sale was finished on December 28, 2012. They also supported the act "Imagine If There Was No Cancer" of Keep A Breast on Vans Warped Tour (celebrating 10 years of the association) in 2011, performing acoustics songs in the event.

On May 7, 2013, Rock for Justice, a non-profit organization, released the project Songs for Justice, a charity compilation that invokes the power of art and creativity to further positive social change, put out by Rock for Justice, a movement that sponsors collaboration between artists and social justice causes. The compilation have 12 cover-songs compose by indie, alternative bands. "They recruited a slew of insanely talented artists to cover other (insanely talented) artists". The Narrative released in the compilation a cover version of Neil Young, "Heart of Gold". The song was recorded earlier in 2012 to be released on it. The project began in 2012, supporting Invisible Children, Inc. which has also been chosen as one of the beneficiaries of the proceeds such as the Give a Damn? documentary project, and The Hunger Project.

On February 25, 2014, Fadeaway Records and Enjoy The Ride Records released a 35-song 3xLP compilation called Friends. After ten years on hiatus, the label came back with the compilation of friends Michael Dubin who runs the label alongside Neil Rubenstein. "I lost my father to Pancreatic cancer in 2002 and I wanted to put together an amazing compilation and donate all of the proceeds to cancer research charity in his memory," declared Michael Dubin about the project. The Narrative released in the compilation, the song "Hallelujah", featured in B-Sides and Seasides.

== Band members ==
Current members

- Jesse Gabriel – lead vocals, lead guitar (2007–present)

Born in October 27, 1984 (age 41), Jesse Gabriel grew up as a child who did not want to learn music as his parents wanted him to. Jesse says: "My parents liked to push instruments on me, but I wasn't really having it, I didn't have the motivation back then to do much of anything other than play video games, but I liked to write songs". After briefly attempting to pick up the piano, violin and tenor sax, Jesse finally learned guitar and fell in love with it. He married Cecilia Cámara, a pastry chef, on September 3, 2011.

- Suzie Zeldin – lead vocals, keyboards, piano (2007–present)

Born on February 26, 1983 (age 43), Susan Tania Zeldin Russell (Suzie Zeldin artistically) started to sing in her childhood. "My grandma would teach me to sing Russian folk songs and then record them on a tape player, but didn't really start focusing on it in any serious way until I got to college." She graduated from New York University with Bachelor's degrees in English literature and American literature. On April 27, 2014, she married the music producer Bryan Russell.

Former members

- Charles J. Seich – drums (2008–2011)

Touring musicians

- Jay Scalchunes – touring drummer (2011–present)
- Ari Sadowitz – studio/live bass (2010–present)

== Tours and live performances ==
- From June 18, to June 28, 2009, the Narrative toured shortly with Destry in the East Coast Tour.
- The Narrative performed at "The Iron Gate Lounge" at SXSW festival on March 19, 2010.
- The band played at CMJ Music Marathon in October 2010, in the Big Picture Media showcase supporting the self-titled album.
- On July 23, 2010, the Narrative performed at the WOOD-TV's "Taste of Grand Rapids".
- The Narrative opened for Relient K on July 29, 2010, at Gramercy Theater.
- On August 5, 2010, The Narrative was the opening act at the Manchester Community College's 2nd annual "Spring Bash".
- In the end of 2010, the Narrative toured with The Secret Handshake, A Cursive Memory, and Speak.
- In 2011, the Narrative toured with Eisley in their "Turning Tide Tour" started on April 26 until July 4, playing at stages such as Bamboozle Festival.
- On June 1, 2011, The Narrative performed on Fox 5 San Diego's Morning News.
- From July 19 to August 14, the Narrative played at Warped Tour 2011 on the Kevin Says Stage.
- The Narrative performed again on CMJ Music Marathon at Sullivan Hall on October 19, 2011.

== Critical reception ==
Evan C. Jones from Alternative Press wrote, "The Narrative is a bit lengthy (eight tracks are more than four minutes long), and the craftsmanship the trio took into creating the album is evident. Hopefully this will be the last time The Narrative will have to self-release their music; labels, take notice."

Tris McCall of the Newark Star-Ledger wrote, "The Narrative joins a wave of young, independent bands that recently have reaffirmed their commitment to the album concept, lavishing attention on sequencing, packaging, cover art, typesetting and, in some cases, old-fashioned storytelling..." and "The Narrative is the rare modern rock album that feels like a dialogue between equals – young songwriters struggling with romantic longing and interpersonal dissolution."

Sean Reid of Alter The Press! wrote, in a review of their self-titled album: "...with their self-titled full-length, its [sic] likely you could hear more from them, as its [sic] a record that is filled with depth, variation and there are moments where the band sound extraordinary [sic] good" and "With Straylight Run no more and Lydia soon to follow, I think fans will find an honest replacement in The Narrative, as this full-length is (at times) refreshing, captivating and filled with plenty of talent. 'The Narrative' covers a lot of ground and the trios [sic] hard work, creativeness and overall talent deserves all the credit it deserves [sic]."

In another article for Alter The Press!, Edward Strickson wrote, "When a record plays on personal weaknesses by playing dueling backing vocals like that it's hard not to sing its praises, but they are praises that are truly deserved, wielding might that lesser elements would have found it hard to conceive."

Glenn Gamboa wrote in Newsday, "The band's Warped Tour shows will likely be their final tour for the year, as they get ready to work on the follow-up to their gorgeous debut The Narrative from last year."

In another Newsday article, Gamboa wrote: "In the year since their CMJ debut, The Narrative has released its eponymous debut, gone on national tours and heard its music used on several MTV shows. And now, The Narrative is ready to play the festival again, hoping the indie-popsters will continue their momentum."

On March 14, 2014, the Narrative was featured in Newsday's "Notable bands from Long Island"

Becky Bain wrote in a "Popping Up" column on Idolator: "Their six-song album caught the attention of tons of music fans and MTV—so we can already imagine the good things to come when the band releases their debut 13-song LP this summer."

"Seanholio" wrote, in a review on the Cool Try site: "I will start this review out by saying that I usually wouldn't review a rarities/b sides album BUT The Narrative are a special case. What other band would take the time out of their busy schedule to video chat with not just 1 but over 40 of their fans who helped fund their tour. During this video chat Vocalist/Keys player Suzie Zeldin mentioned that whilst they are working hard on their follow up to their debut self titled album they didn't realize how this album is more than just a b sides album. It has some brand new songs, it has alternate versions and it has covers. It is safe to say that this is a decent and proper release for 2012. And when a band is as dedicated to their fans as their fans are to them I felt it only fair to promote them as much as I could."

Absolutepunk.net wrote, about the Unsigned Showcase: For our latest Unsigned Showcase, we are bringing you a stream of The Narrative's excellent EP, Just Say Yes, along with an exclusive new demo named "Fade." If you like Lydia, Death Cab for Cutie, or old Straylight Run, head to the band's AP.net profile to check out all the goodness.

They too wrote in the "AbsolutePunk.net Top 100": "The Narrative are the kind of raw, young talent that makes lesser bands envious. The charming duel vocals of Jesse Gabriel and Suzie Zeldin on Just Say Yes are some of the best you'll ever find on an introductory EP, and the music is alluring in its own right."

Another Absolutepunk.net article wrote: "The Narrative are easily one of the best unsigned bands out there and should find fans wherever they find listeners."

Review Rinse Repeat said, "The Narrative have undoubtedly grown as a band since releasing Just Say Yes. Their self-titled album is an incredibly strong debut, laced with an abundance of wonderful songs, and a few slight, forgivable, missteps. From here, the world is in The Narrative's palm, they can only go on to bigger and better things."

The Patriot-News, PENNLIVE wrote: "As heard on MTV's "Real World Brooklyn" and "Real World Cancun," The Narrative is known for its intoxicating vocals and diverse lyrical arrangements. This New York-based group is making its mark on the music industry with its story-telling theme."

On Flavorpill, Andrew Phillips wrote: "Sure, they sound like wayward members of the Ben Gibbard brigade, but NYC indie-poppers The Narrative add an inspired pair of female pipes to the jangly emoisms of Photo Album-era Death Cab for Cutie. While their homage is strikingly similar — enough so that some may consider them a carbon copy — The Narrative's embrace of the former Barsuk band is so well wrought that, at times, they really do rival the original. The band hits town tonight alongside dancey, guitar-driven acts MakeupBreakup and Robes"

Lushbeat wrote: "This young band knows how to structure not only a song, but an entire album, which is one of the most important aspects of the listening experience."

== Discography ==
- The Narrative – (2010)
- Golden Silence – (2016)

== See also ==
- List of songs recorded by the Narrative
