= Lucy Gray (album) =

Studio album by Envy On The Coast
- Released: (United States) August 7, 2007
- Recorded: Red Wire Audio, Brooklyn, NY
- Genres: Pop punk, post-hardcore, emo
- Length: 49:43
- Label: Photo Finish Records
- Producer: Bryan Russell

Envy On The Coast chronology
Envy on the Coast (EP) (2006)	Lucy Gray (2007)	Lowcountry (2010)

Lucy Gray is the debut full-length album from American post-hardcore band, Envy on the Coast. The album was released under Matt Galle's Photo Finish Records on August 7, 2007. The album's first single, "Sugar Skulls", is currently on the iTunes Music store. "Mirrors" has also been released as the second single. The album features guest vocals from members of As Tall As Lions and Circa Survive.

== Reception ==
Professional ratings
Review scores
Source	Rating
AbsolutePunk.net	76%
AllMusic	3/5 stars
Newsday	4/4 stars
Sputnikmusic	3/5
Ultimate Guitar	8.7/10

Critics were generally positive towards Lucy Gray. Ultimate Guitar claimed the album "rarely repeats itself and entertains with the vocalists varying skills and the poetic lyrics". The album was one of The High Court drummer Denny Carvell's top five favorite albums of 2007.

A common point was the group's differentiation from similar artists. Glenn Gamboa, in a four-star-out-of-four review for Newsday, celebrated the album for its combination of emo's aggressiveness and "stadium-ready choruses" with emotional depth and "clever little touches of masters twice their ages -- an elegant drum fill here, a piano twinkle there". Corey Apar felt that there was "more noticeable ambition [...] than most of their peers attempt on album number one", citing its rejection of "huge choruses and cheeky lyrics" in favor of theatrical touches such as the background choral on "(X) Amount of Truth" and mixtures of "dynamic vocals and dexterous guitars with subtly shifting rhythms" on certain tracks. Spin's Trevor Kelley argued that the heavy lyrical content prevented the album from being unmemorable emo material. On the other hand, Sputnikmusic staff writer Iluvatar viewed most of the album was too typical for its genre, where the only highlights were early on and it became lesser in quality and nuance as it progressed.

Another frequent praise was the musicianship. Kelley called Brian Byrne the best aspect of the LP, "whose space-metal riffs and effects-pedal bombast truly send these songs skyward". Iluvatar considered Ryan Hunter the group's most "effective" player, praising his "well-developed" timbre and proper sense of restraint. He also spotlighted the instrumental work, writing that there were "two guitarists playing off each other often, with the drums and bass serving as solid backbones with enough chances to contribute a nice fill", and positively compared the lead guitar lines to the works of Circa Survive. A criticism from Apar and Iluvatar was the album's length; Iluvatar felt the group "put 15 minutes too much in this nearly 50 minute disc", while Apar felt it should've been shorter to be more memorable and "streamline the band's musical vision", and have one less ballad.

== Track listing ==
1. "Sugar Skulls" – 3:11
2. "Artist and Repertoire" – 4:44
3. "The Gift of Paralysis" (feat. Anthony Green) – 4:38
4. "Tell Them That She's Not Scared" – 4:18
5. "(x) Amount of Truth" – 1:48
6. "Vultures" – 4:09
7. "Mirrors" – 3:28
8. "If God Smokes Cheap Cigars" – 4:42
9. "Starving Your Friends" – 4:35
10. "Lapse" – 5:40
11. "...Because All Suffering Is Sweet to Me..." (feat. Dan Nigro) – 3:58
12. "I'm Breathing...Are You Breathing Too?" (feat. Suzie Zeldin) – 4:32

== Charts ==
Chart (2007)	Peak position
US Heatseekers Albums (Billboard)	11
US Independent Albums (Billboard)	32
