= Bryan Russell =

American record producer (born 1981)

- Born: March 22, 1981 (age 45)
- Origin: Malvern, Pennsylvania, U.S.
- Genres: Alternative rock, Electronic Music, post-hardcore, experimental rock, progressive rock, hardcore punk, power pop, pop rock, classical
- Occupations: Producer, songwriter, musician, Audio engineer, Audio mixer,
- Years active: 2002–present
- Website: redwireaudio.com

Bryan Russell (born March 22, 1981) is an American record producer. His credits include artists such as Straylight Run, Envy on the Coast, the Academy Is, and Anterrabae, and has also worked on records with Coldplay, Dream Theater, Paul Simon, Blue Wolf and Steely Dan. Bryan started his career working on The Hit Factory after his graduation on Oberlin College from 2002 to 2005. In the same year, he started his studio Red Wire Audio.

He is currently living and working out of New York City and married to Suzie Zeldin, of the bands the Narrative and Twin Forks, on 27 April 2014.

== Albums produced by Bryan Russell ==
List of respective bands, albums and the role produced by Bryan Russell

Artist/Group	Album	Role
Coldplay	X&Y	Assistant
The Narrative	The Narrative; Just Say Yes; B-Sides and Seasides; Golden Silence	Produce / Engineer / Mix
NGHBRS	Twenty One Rooms	Produce / Engineer / Mix
Twin Forks	Twin Forks EP; Twin Forks (album)	Mix
Heavy English	21 Flights	Produce / Engineer
Avalon Landing	Reside	Produce / Engineer / Mix
Volbeat	Outlaw Gentlemen and Shady Ladies	Produce / Engineer / Mix
Destry	Waiting on an Island	Produce / Engineer / Mix
Tiny Victories	Those of US Still Alive EP	Engineer / Mix
Dream Theater	Official Bootleg: When Dream And Day Reunite	Mix
The Damned Things	Ironiclast	Engineer
Paul Simon	The Complete Album Collection; Surprise	Engineer
Straylight Run	Prepare to Be Wrong; About Time	Engineer; Producer, Engineer
The Academy Is...	Fast Times at Barrington High	Engineer
Anterrabae	And Our Heart Beat in Our Fingertips Without Reason	Mix
Dream Theater	Official Bootleg: When Dream And Day Reunite	Mix
Envy on the Coast	Lucy Gray; Envy on the Coast EP	Additional Personnel, Audio Engineer, Audio Production, Engineer, Glockenspiel, Keyboards, Mixing, Producer; Engineer, Keyboards, Mixing, Producer
