= EOTC =

EOTC can be an acronym for:

- The Ethiopian Orthodox Tewahedo Church
- The Eritrean Orthodox Tewahedo Church
- Envy on the Coast, a rock band from Long Island, New York, U.S.
