= Golden Silence =

Studio album by the Narrative
- Released: December 2, 2016
- Recorded: March 26, 2012 – April 2012 at: English Cathedral Barn (Hunter, New York); 2013–2014 at: Red Wire Audio (New York, NY)
- Genre: Indie rock; contemporary pop; synth-pop
- Length: 46:31
- Producer: Bryan Russell; The Narrative

The Narrative chronology
B-Sides and Seasides (2012)	Golden Silence (2016)

Singles from Golden Silence
- 1. "Chasing a Feeling" Released: June 3, 2014; 2. "Moving Out" Released: January 12, 2016; 3. "Toe the Line" Released: January 27, 2016

Golden Silence is the second full-length studio album by American indie pop band the Narrative, released on December 2, 2016. The album was produced by Bryan Russell and Justin Long at Red Wire Audio in New York. "Chasing a Feeling" was released as the album's lead single on June 3, 2014. The promotional single from the album, "Moving Out" was released on January 12, 2016, followed by "Toe the Line" released on January 27, 2016. On October 28, 2016, the band released the songs "California Sun", followed by "Oklahoma Air" on November 9 and "Reason to Leave" on November 21 promoting the album before its release.

== Background and recording ==
"It's going to be different from our previous stuff, we still embrace a lot of the things that people like about our music, but we experimented in a lot of places as well. Production-wise we are going in a bit of a different direction (...) For better or for worse, we’ve changed the way we see the process of writing and recording in general."

— Zeldin, on the Golden Silence.

On July 27, 2010, the Narrative released their self-titled studio album The Narrative. After its release, they went in national tour on to promote the album. In 2011 the band made its first performance at the festival Vans Warped Tour in July followed by another CMJ Music Marathon performance in the end of the year. Later in 2012, the Narrative stated to AbsolutePunk, that they had begun writing and working on their second studio album. Recording sessions began on March 26, 2012. The band chose to record the album in a different way of the previous, recorded entirely in a closed studio. They spent one month recording the most part of the instrumentals, vocals and sounds elements and producing it, at an English cathedral barn built in 1900, in Upstate New York, Hunter. The recordings in the barn were finished in April 2012, after that the duo went to the studio Red Wire Audio in Brooklyn to finish the album tracking. The album was produced by Bryan Russell, who has produced the previous albums released by the band, and Justin Long. The band also worked with the music producer and mixer, Richard Flack, who has previously produced records for Florence and the Machine and Robbie Williams. Without a drummer member, the duo was helped by their friend Jay Scalchunes and also by Ari Sadowitz, who recorded the bass. The Narrative had announced the album's release date to mid-2012, but the date was delayed, due its conclusion. On June 3, 2014, was announced through their official website, its first single from the album titled "Chasing a Feeling" released on June 3, 2014. While Zeldin went on tour with the Americana band Twin Forks, Gabriel started recording a solo album with Russell. The project was announced through the Narrative's Facebook account on February 15, 2014, and on October 12, Gabriel released the album Here, Sit, Stay through digital download.

The production of the album finished in April 2016, according to the website which stated that the album took longer to be finished due to the instrumentation recording of different instruments and more complex arrangements and the mixing of it in the UK with Richard Flack. The band also worked with Sam Moses for the album mastering in Nashville, TN. Also the band stated that the album was delayed due to the "budgetary constraints of the independent group leding to a slowing and eventual end of the project".

== Style and influences ==
To write and compose the musical style of the Golden Silence, the band took influences from folk artists such as Counting Crows, Arcade Fire, Bon Iver, Bruce Springsteen, Regina Spektor, Modest Mouse and Jimmy Eat World. They used of different instruments, such as Koto, orchestral arrangements, horns and bass clarinet, ambient elements, violoncello, ukuleles, autoharps and accordions as well the band explored the synthpop and the contemporary pop, using mixing synthesizers and electronic drums. "It's more explorative," Gabriel affirmed to NewsDay, "The release keep the same mix of female-male vocals", Zeldin added.

== Promotion and release ==
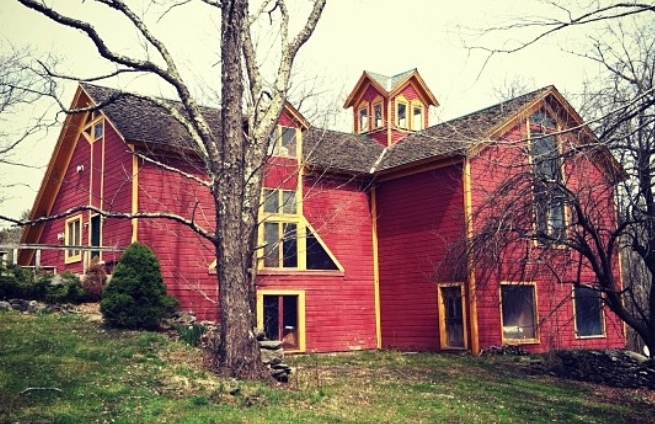
Converted barn used by The Narrative to record arrangements and vocals for "Chasing a Feeling".

After leaving the barn, the Narrative released a B-side compilation, titled B-Sides and Seasides on April 4, 2012, to fund the album production with donation packages sold through their official website. These donation packages included from digital downloads to Skype performances, exclusive items and private acoustic shows. Afterward, they published online a lyric video of the b-side track "Hallelujah" containing footages from the album recordings. The large promotion for the album came earlier when the band was featured in an interview on NewsDay on June 19, 2012, where they talked about the album production during its recording stages. On November 15, 2012, to December 9, 2012, the songs "Toe The Line" and "Moving Out" were revealed live on their small tour of the east coast on United States.

In the beginning of 2014, the band start to tease previews of the songs they recorded in the album's rehearsals at the barn, onto their Instagram account. The album's track listing was published by the band on a Facebook update on September, 26.

== Singles ==
On July 3, 2014, the Narrative released, to digital retailers, their lead single from the album, "Chasing a Feeling" premiered courtesy of American Songwriter. The music video for "Chasing a Feeling" was directed by the photographers Sean O'Kane with help of Hilary J. Corts, and shot on November 11, 2013, at Allentown, PA. It was premièred on July 28, 2014, on Idolator.

=== Promotional singles ===
"Moving Out" was released as a promotional single on January 12, 2016, through digital download. Different from the first single, "Moving Out" features the style of alternative rock and pop punk. The following promotional single "Toe the Line" was released on January 27, 2016. On October 28, 2016, the band released the song "California Sun" to announce the release date of the album. Still promoting the album release, the band premiered on November 9, 2016, the song "Oklahoma Air" along with the pre-order of the album on the iTunes Store. Its last single, before the album release, "Reason to Leave" was released November 21, 2016.

== Track listing ==
All tracks are written by Suzie Zeldin, Jesse Gabriel.

No.	Title	Length
1.	"Moving Out"	4:14
2.	"Chasing a Feeling"	4:32
3.	"Already Changed"	4:29
4.	"Toe the Line"	4:13
5.	"Oklahoma Air"	4:35
6.	"I Can Make a Mess"	5:40
7.	"California Sun"	5:07
8.	"Home"	4:12
9.	"Reason to Leave"	3:22
10.	"Suburbs"	6:07
Total length:		46:31

== Personnel ==
The Narrative

- Suzie Zeldin – vocals, piano, keyboards, songwriting, percussion
- Jesse Gabriel – vocals, guitar, banjo, koto, autoharp, songwriting, percussion

Additional musicians

- Alex Overington – instrumental arrangements
- Jay Scalchunes – drums, percussion
- Ari Sadowitz – bass
- Bryan Russell – accordion
- Dylan Ebrahimian – violin
- Jon Block – violin
- Phil Carter – viola
- Mohit Mansukani – cello
- David Harary – clarinet, bass clarinet
- Karri Diomede – flute
- Wes Maples – saxophone
- Jonathan D. Schneck – banjo

Production

- Bryan Russell – production, engineering
- Justin Long – engineering
- Sean Killary – engineering
- Richard Flack – mixing
- Jon Florencio – mixing
- Sam Moses – mastering
- Vicky Dinka – photography
