= B-Sides and Seasides =

Compilation album by the Narrative
- Released: April 4, 2012
- Recorded: 2012
- Genre: Indie pop, indie rock, rock
- Length: 42:20
- Label: The Record Collective
- Producer: Bryan Russell

The Narrative chronology
The Narrative (2010)	B-Sides and Seasides (2012)	Golden Silence (2016)

B-Sides and Seasides is a 2012 B-side compilation album by the American group the Narrative, released on April 4 and produced by Bryan Russell at Red Wire Audio.

== Background ==
In 2012 the Narrative started to record their second full-length album in New York and released the b-side compilation, with another donation packages sold through their official website, to fund the album production. The compilation include acoustics, alternate versions of the songs from The Narrative and Just Say Yes. It includes two new songs "Hallelujah" and "Make It Right" (from the touring EP Kickstarter and Nothing Without You) and covers of Radiohead's "Karma Police" and of Brand New's "Tautou", where the band has created an extended version for the song.

The cover picture was taken by Hilary J. Corts on 2011 in the city of Phoenix, Arizona.

== Track listing ==
No.	Title	Length
1.	"Hallelujah"	4:23
2.	"Make It Right"	3:48
3.	"Winter's Coming (Acoustic)"	5:07
4.	"Castling (Acoustic)"	4:06
5.	"Fade (Alternate Version)"	4:58
6.	"Silence & Sirens (Acoustic)"	3:47
7.	"You Will Be Mine (Acoustic)"	3:56
8.	"End All (2007 Demo)"	3:39
9.	"Tautou"	4:19
10.	"Karma Police"	4:17
Total length:		42:20

Professional ratings
Review scores
Source	Rating
Cooltry (Bro)	5/5

== Personnel ==
The Narrative

- Suzie Zeldin – vocals, keys
- Jesse Gabriel – vocals, guitar

Additional personnel

- Bryan Russell – producer
- Hilary J. Corts – album cover

== Critical response ==
"Seanholio" from Cooltry wrote: "I usually wouldn’t review a rarities/b sides album but The Narrative are a special case. What other band would take the time out of their busy schedule to video chat with not just 1 but over 40 of their fans who helped fund their tour. During this video chat Vocalist/Keys player Suzie Zeldin mentioned that whilst they are working hard on their follow up to their debut self titled album they didn’t realize how this album is more than just a b sides album. It has some brand new songs, it has alternate versions and it has covers. It is safe to say that this is a decent and proper release for 2012".

== Notes ==
ASIN B007RE9VKC
