= Chasing a Feeling =

Single by the Narrative

from the album Golden Silence
- Released: June 3, 2014 (digital download)
- Recorded: March 2012 – 2013 at Red Wire Audio, New York City, with Bryan Russell
- Length: 4:33
- Songwriters: Suzie Zeldin; Jesse Gabriel
- Producer: Bryan Russell

Music video
- "Chasing a Feeling" on YouTube

"Chasing a Feeling" is a song by the American indie pop band the Narrative. The song was write by Suzie Zeldin (keys/vocals) and Jesse Gabriel (guitars/vocals). Recorded in 2012 in New York City, the song is the first single released by the band and is the lead single of their second studio album (2014). The single was released on June 3, 2014, in digital download. The accompanying music video was filmed on November 11, 2013, and directed by Sean O'Kane.

== Background ==
"Chasing a Feeling"
A 17-second sample of "Chasing a Feeling", a song that lyrically, revolves around accepting that life keeps moving forward.

"Chasing a Feeling" was recorded in 2012 at a converted barn in Upstate New York and finished at Brooklyn, with the vocals, in the band's apartment and at Red Wire Audio with Bryan Russell. As the band said on a YouTube video, they recorded on the barn the instrumental part of the album for after this began the vocals recordings. The song is part of the upcoming album to be released in autumn 2014. "Chasing a Feeling" runs for a duration of four minutes and thirty three seconds. The song features new elements to the Narrative's music, synths and texture. The band discussed the concept of the song, premiered at American Songwriter website, saying "Chasing a Feeling’ is about accepting that life keeps moving forward, whether or not you’re ready for it. Being indecisive doesn’t stop everything around you from changing, and getting swept up in a really difficult moment in your life can feel endless but eventually it passes. It’s about time, how you spend it, and how it eventually brings you clarity and comfort" For the cover of "Chasing a Feeling" was used a Polaroid picture taken by Vicky Dinka at the tower of the fireplace and in the background the chandelier at the barn where the album, featuring the song, was recorded in 2012.

== Track listing ==
Digital download
No.	Title	Writer(s)	Producer(s)	Length
1.	"Chasing a Feeling"	Suzie Zeldin, Jesse Gabriel	Bryan Russell, Justin Long	4:33

== Music video ==
Gabriel, Zeldin and Victoria in the song's music video. In the scene Gabriel and Zeldin are shown as dolls being graced by Victoria.

The music video was filmed Allentown, PS in 12 hours shooting on November 11, 2013. The Narrative confirmed the music video on Facebook post, "We recorded a music video some months ago (...) and will be finishing that as well as the song associated with it very soon." It was directed and filmed by the photographer's Sean O'Kane, Terry O'Kane and Hilary J. Corts. The music video was premiered on July 28, 2014, on Idolator.

The concept was created around the idea of the song itself. As Jesse explained on interview, "The song itself is telling you that life just keeps moving whether or not you’re ready for it, but the video is almost making fun of what happens if you try and force something into being the thing you want it to be, when it’s really not that thing at all."

The video uses from bright colors, vintage elements and merges between scenes where Suzie Zeldin and Jesse Gabriel are dressed like dolls trying to escape from a blond girl (Zeldin's sister, Victoria Zeldin) who locked them at the closet in an hiding house in the forest. In the presence of this girl, they turn as dolls, when she leaves the room, they get back to 'real life' running between the rooms. The band appears also singing in normal dresses in a room with the ground covered with petals. The video closes with a shot of Zeldin and Gabriel running out from the house, when the girl appears they fall to the ground as dolls again, She pull their legs and drag them back for the house.

== Critical reception ==
Tori Mier from AlterThePress wrote: "Their work collection boasts songs that feel like an afternoon stroll on a gentle summer’s day, full of soft sounds that build to a release, as well as tracks like the recently-released “Chasing A Feeling,” that touch upon something murkier beneath the surface."

== Personnel ==
The Narrative

- Suzie Zeldin − vocals, keyboard
- Jesse Gabriel − vocals, guitar

Additional personnel

- Bryan Russell − producer, engineer
- Justin Long − co-producer, programming
- Jay Scalchunes − drums
- Ari Sadowitz − bass

Music video

- Sean O'Kane − director, cinematographer
- Terry O'Kane − cinematographer
- Hilary J. Corts − cinematographer

== Release history ==
=== Commercial ===
Country	Date	Format	Label
United States	June 3, 2014	Digital download	Self-released
