= Kickstarter EP =

EP by the Narrative
- Released: March 24, 2011
- Recorded: 2011
- Genre: Indie pop
- Length: 16:09
- Producer: Bryan Russell

The Narrative chronology
The Narrative (2010)	Kickstarter EP (2011)	B-Sides and Seasides (2012)

Kickstarter EP is a promotional EP by the American group the Narrative featured in Kickstarter project for the band in March–April Spring Tour 2011 with Eisley.

The band have posted on their Twitter account about the process of recording those songs for the EP and on March 24, 2011, they released the EP, name of the platform used for funding the Spring Tour with Eisley. The sale of the EP had a special package with 3/4 signed items for the band.

The band had set $5,000 for this project initially. The campaign was successfully funded with an amount of $8,500. This promotional EP was released with two new songs, "Hallelujah" and "Make It Right", recorded especially for the EP and featured in the digital release for the 2012 B-Sides and Seasides band EP, the cover of Radiohead, "Karma Police", and the demo version of "End All" of 2007.

== Track listing ==
No.	Title	Length
1.	"Hallelujah"	4:23
2.	"Make It Right"	3:48
3.	"End All (Demo 2007)"	3:40
4.	"Karma Police"	4:17
Total length:		16:09

== Personnel ==
The Narrative

- Suzie Zeldin – vocals, keys
- Jesse Gabriel – vocals, guitar

Additional personnel

- Bryan Russell – producer
- Joshua Krohn – album cover

== Critical response ==
The site Alter The Press! wrote a review for the EP "When a record plays on personal weaknesses by playing dueling backing vocals like that it’s hard not to sing its praises, but they are praises that are truly deserved, wielding might that lesser elements would have found it hard to conceive."
