= Nothing Without You (EP) =

EP by the Narrative
- Released: March 6, 2010
- Recorded: 2010
- Genre: Indie Pop, Rock
- Length: 11:56
- Producer: Byran Russell

The Narrative chronology
Just Say Yes (2008)	Nothing Without You (2010)	The Narrative (2010)

Professional ratings
Review scores
Source	Rating
Alter The Press!	4/5 stars

Nothing Without You was the name of a limited Tour EP performed by the American group the Narrative. The tours were between March 6 to 31, 2010.

The cover of their EP was designed by making use of a handmade art technique called woodcutting. It is available with three alternate covers and only 40 editions made available. It was played in the SXSW show from 16 to March 31, 2010.

It received mainly favorable reviews by Alter The Press, with 4/5 stars for the album and said, "Although the overall style sounds repetitive at times, it can't be argued that The Narrative have talent, both as songwriters and musicians as this record shows a band who truly care about their craft; each track is well-thought-out and has tweaked to near-perfection."

The band released the EP of the acoustic version of the song "Castling" from Just Say Yes, the new cover, recorded in 2009 with The Narrative sessions, from Brand New, Tautou, and the demo version of the song "Fade", which was released in 2010.

== Track listing ==
No.	Title	Length
1.	"Castling (acoustic)"	4:23
2.	"Tautou (Brand New cover)"	3:48
3.	"Fade (demo version)"	3:40
Total length:		11:56

== Personnel ==
The Narrative

- Suzie Zeldin – vocals, keys
- Jesse Gabriel – vocals, guitar

Additional personnel

- Bryan Russell – producer
