= Songs for Justice =

Compilation album by Various Artists
- Released: 7 May 2013
- Recorded: 2012–2013
- Genre: Indie pop, indie rock, rock

"Songs for Justice" is a charity compilation released by the non-profit company Rock For Justice, that fight against global poverty and social injustice, on 7 May 2013.

== Background ==
The album started to be recorded by the artists in March–April 2012 until the beginning of 2013. The compilation was released with partnering of Speak Up Productions. The projects that benefited from the proceeds were Invisible Children, Inc., the Give a Damn? and The Hunger Project.

== List of bands names ==
List of the bands included in the compilation

- Brooke Waggoner
- Cara Salimando
- Funeral Party
- Generationals
- Hotel of the Laughing Tree
- Jhameel
- Kindred Fall
- Les Sages
- Savior Adore
- The Dear Hunter
- The Narrative
- Tapioca And The Flea
- Young Statues
- William Beckett

== Track listing ==
1. "Here Comes the Night" - Generationals – 2:22
2. "Come Pick Me Up" - William Beckett, Cara Salimando – 5:05
3. "God Only Knows" - The Dear Hunter – 3:01
4. "Local Joke" - Savoir Adore – 3:04
5. "Ooh La La" - Funeral Party – 3:16
6. "Who Is It?" - Kindred Fall – 3:52
7. "Nowhere Man" - Tapioca & The Flea– 2:33
8. "My Girls" - Jhameel– 2:56
9. "The Love Cats" - Les Sages– 3:45
10. "Crazy Little Thing Called Love" - Hotel Of The Laughing Tree – 2:55
11. "Ashes & Fire" - Young Statues – 3:19
12. "Heart Of Gold" - The Narrative – 3:36
13. "Life On Mars?" - Brooke Waggoner – 3:25
