= Twin Forks (album) =

Studio album by Twin Forks
- Released: February 25, 2014
- Genre: Folk rock
- Length: 41:50
- Label: Dine Alone
- Producer: Ammar Malik; Robopop

Twin Forks chronology
Twin Forks E.P. (2013)	Twin Forks (2014)

Twin Forks is the eponymously titled debut studio album from Folk rock band Twin Forks. Produced by Ammar Malik and Robopop, the album was released on February 25, 2014, through Dine Alone Records.

== Release and promotion ==
On February 20, 2014, USA Today premiered the album and listeners were allowed to stream it in its entirety.

== Critical reception ==
Professional ratings
Aggregate scores
Source	Rating
Metacritic	71/100
Review scores
Source	Rating
AbsolutePunk	85%
AllMusic	2.5/5 stars
Alternative Press	4/5 stars
HM Magazine	5/5 stars
Rock Sound	8/10
This Is Fake DIY	3/5 stars

Twin Forks received generally positive reviews from music critics. At Metacritic, they assign a "weighted average" score to selected independent ratings and reviews, and based upon five reviews the album has a score of a 71 out of 100, which means the album received "Generally favorable" reviews. At Rock Sound, Andrew Kelham rated the album an eight-out-of-a-ten, stating that this "is an album of freedom and exploration, the sound of people taking risks for the sake of song." Craig Manning of AbsolutePunk rated the album an 85-percent, saying that this release "is comfortable and likable". At Alternative Press, Aubrey Welbers rated the album four stars out of five, writing that "Although the musical and lyrical content are more mature, what hasn't changed is the familiar empathetic thrill of Carabba's [sic] songwriting." Rob Houston of HM rated the album a perfect five stars, stating how "Twin Forks feels like a great getaway to classic folk and the Americana genre", and says it is "Carrabba through and through." At This Is Fake DIY, Tom Doyle rated the album three stars out of five, indicating how the album "might be cookie-cutter, but cookies are delicious." Timothy Monger of Allmusic rated the album two-and-a-half stars out of five, cautioning "too much of this album panders to worn-out themes and clichés."

== Track listing ==
Tracklist
No.	Title	Length
1.	"Can't Be Broken"	3:36
2.	"Cross My Mind"	3:34
3.	"Back to You"	2:50
4.	"Kiss Me Darling"	2:59
5.	"Scraping Up the Pieces"	2:48
6.	"Something We Just Know"	2:52
7.	"Danger"	3:40
8.	"Reasoned and Roughened"	4:15
9.	"Plans"	3:36
10.	"Done"	3:30
11.	"Come On"	4:03
12.	"Who's Looking Out"	4:07
Total length:		41:50

== Chart performance ==
Chart (2014)	Peak position
US Billboard 200	144
US Top Alternative Albums (Billboard)	25
US Heatseekers Albums (Billboard)	2
US Independent Albums (Billboard)	30
US Top Rock Albums (Billboard)	34
