= Keep a Breast Foundation =

Nonprofit organization in Carlsbad, United States

- Abbreviation: KAB
- Formation: 2000
- Founder: Shaney Jo Darden; Mona Mukherjea-Gehrig
- Founded at: Los Angeles, California, United States
- Type: Nonprofit
- Tax ID no.: 13-4286549
- Purpose: breast cancer prevention & education
- Headquarters: Yucca Valley, California, United States
- Website: keep-a-breast.org

The Keep a Breast Foundation (KAB) is a 501(c)(3) non-profit organization focused on breast cancer prevention, education, and early detection, based in Yucca Valley, California, United States.

== Founding ==
The organization was co-founded by Shaney Jo Darden and Mona Mukherjea-Gehrig in 2000.

Mukherjea-Gehrig relocated to California from Berlin, Germany, in 1994. Darden grew up in Southern California. In 1998, Darden and Mukherjea-Gehrig organized art and fashion events showcasing the work of friends, coworkers, and local kids from the action sports scene, expanding to include street artists, fine artists, and graphic designers. When a friend of Darden's was diagnosed with breast cancer in 2000, Darden and Mukherjea-Gehrig "decided to stick with Modart's model of bringing people together through progressive art."

In 2000, the founders developed a technique for creating breast casts that could be customized by artists. The first breast cast auction was in the same year. Some past breast cast exhibitions include: Tokyo LOVE show, Keep a Breast PDX, American Rag X LAB Art, Bare Minerals, Bordeaux Love, and Snow Show.

Keep a Breast Foundation officially received nonprofit status in 2005. In 2008, Darden quit her job to focus on the Keep a Breast Foundation full-time. Darden moved the foundation out of her home, and into an office in Carlsbad, California.

== Current educational programs ==
The Check Yourself program creates and distributes breast health education through printed materials, blogs, and the Check Yourself! App. Its primary focus is raising awareness regarding the importance of monthly breast self-examinations.

The Treasured Chest program supports women diagnosed with breast cancer or testing positive for the BRCA1 or BRCA2 gene with an opportunity to create their own breast cast. TCP kits have been sent out everywhere in the United States, with a large portion of them having gone out to women under the age of 40.

The Non-Toxic Revolution (NTR) program's mission is to inform, educate, and inspire young people to revolt against the dangers of toxic chemicals in their environment and food supply, especially those linked to the development of breast cancer.

== Prevention and education campaigns ==
=== I love boobies! ===
In 2008, KAB released their "I love boobies!" shame-free breast awareness message. This message was designed to take a positive approach to breast cancer dialogue. It particularly resonates with young people and encourages them to be open and active about breast cancer prevention.

"I love boobies!" is focused on sparking dialog among young people about breast cancer and breast health. Many different kinds of "I love boobies!" merchandise have been made to further this cause, and revenues from this merchandise fund KAB programs and campaigns, broaden its reach, and in the past, provide grant money supporting important studies.

==== School controversy ====
The "I love boobies!" bracelets were created by the Keep a Breast Foundation in 2004. The foundation sold one-inch wide silicone rubber bracelets emblazoned with the slogan "i ♥ boobies! (Keep a Breast)" to raise money and encourage conversations about breast cancer among young people. The foundation's marketing manager, Kimmy McAtee, described the slogan as "[speaking] to young people in their own voice about a subject that's very scary and taboo."

As the bracelets became a fashion craze among teenagers, many school districts began to ban the wearing of these bracelets as the slogan conflicted with school dress codes which prohibit the wearing of any item that includes sexually explicit language or pictures.

A dispute over the school bannings reached the U.S. Court of Appeals for the Third Circuit. A panel of three judges heard the case, which was then re-heard by all 14 judges en banc. The court ruled 9–5 that the school's ban on the bracelets violated the students' right to free speech because the bracelets were not plainly offensive or disruptive and were speech conducted to raise awareness of a social issue. The U.S. Supreme Court later declined to take up the case. In 2011, co-founder Shaney Jo Darden gave a TEDx talk regarding KAB and the "I love boobies!" bracelet controversy.

=== Current and past campaigns ===
The "DIY Action" campaign was created for people who wish to start their own fundraiser benefiting KAB. The organization provides educational materials and awareness merchandise, and the events range anywhere from skateboarding and music events, to cook-offs and birthday parties.

The "#checkyourselfie" campaign was created to share the message of breast self-checks with friends and followers via social media platforms. It is meant to encourage people to download the free KAB Check Yourself! app, which explains how to do a self-check and lets users set a monthly reminder for future checks.

"Fit 4 Prevention" is a national movement to raise awareness about breast cancer prevention through fitness and wellness. The goal of F4P is to inspire people to reduce their risk of cancer by adopting a healthier, more active lifestyle.

"Imagine If..." was a support program intended for young people to share their feelings concerning what the world would be like if there were no cancer. It was part of the Keep a Breast Traveling Education Booth and traveled on music tours, festivals, and events around the world. Participants wrote down their responses on a small whiteboard, took photos with their "Imagine If..." responses, and then shared the photos on the internet and social media.

The "This is My Story" campaign gave people a chance to share the impact breast cancer had on their lives through writing or video. Videos and written testimonies were shared on KAB's YouTube Channel, website, and social media platforms.

== Partnerships ==
KAB has partnered with Rastaclat, HUF, True&Co., Valiant Entertainment, and S.W. Basics, among others. Some of their partnerships are specifically intended for the month of October, which KAB refers to as Breast Cancer Prevention Month. Partnerships have included product collaborations, outreach, advertising, special events, and promotions.

On October 1, 2019, Thrive Causemetics donated their profits to Keep a Breast Foundation. Thrive Causemetics also committed to donating $5 for social media image reposts with the hashtag #thrivecausemetics for the rest of the month of October.

=== Warped Tour ===
In 2001, Keep a Breast Foundation went on Vans Warped Tour. KAB continued to participate through the last Vans Warped Tour in 2018. On the tour, KAB had a tent filled with educational materials and merchandise, as well as volunteers and employees to help educate and provide support for anyone interested. KAB participated in several collaborations featuring artists from the Warped Tour, including Check Yourself! Vol 1 and Music for Boobies.

== Global ==
The Keep a Breast Foundation has had affiliates in Japan, Canada, Europe, Mexico, and Chile. KAB Europe has a headquarters in Bordeaux, France, which was developed by the global CEO, Lorene Carpentier.
