= Peak Season =

- Genre: Reality; Docudrama
- Starring: see Starring
- Original language: English
- No. of seasons: 1
- No. of episodes: 10

Production
- Running time: 20–22 minutes

Original release
- Network: MTV (Canada)
- Release: October 19 – December 14, 2009

Peak Season is an MTV Canada reality television series set in Whistler, British Columbia. The premier was on October 19, 2009, and delivered the highest ratings for a series on MTV Canada. The show follows the lives of several young adult characters in the reality television style. The show concluded its first season December 14, 2009, aired on MTV Canada on Monday nights at 10 p.m. EST, and was followed by The After Show.

== Premise ==
The show follows the lives of young adults living in the Canadian ski resort of Whistler.

Name	Notes
Lauren Horton	"The party girl." Originally from Ajax, Ontario.
Stephanie Just	Aspiring professional snowboarder. "The snowboarder."
Matt James	Originally from Australia. Elle's boyfriend. "The violent drunk."
Elle Hetherington	Originally from Australia. Matt's girlfriend. "The good girl."
Ian Ross	"The bachelor." Originally from Steamworks, Ontario.
Dré Morel	Amanda's boyfriend. "The DJ." Originally from Whistler, BC.
Amanda Scheller	Dré's girlfriend. "The model." .
John Stebbing	The flirty and dirty snowboarder from Calgary, AB.
Jenelle Pritchard	Stephanie Just's roommate.
