= Twin Forks (EP) =

EP by Twin Forks
- Released: September 17, 2013
- Recorded: 2012
- Genre: Folk
- Length: 14:22
- Language: English
- Label: Dine Alone Records

Twin Forks chronology
Twin Forks (2013)	Twin Forks (2014)

Twin Forks is the first EP from American band Twin Forks, released on September 17, 2013, through Dine Alone Records. The EP received positive reviews "For better or worse, it’s evident that this is just the beginning for Twin Forks, but if this is what they’re producing straight out of the gate we can only imagine what’s to come. We want and need more. Like, now."

== Appearances in media ==
"Back To You" was featured in the pilot episode of the CW TV series "Reign".

== Track listing ==
No.	Title	Length
1.	"Back to You"	2:51
2.	"Something We Just Know"	2:52
3.	"Cross My Mind"	3:35
4.	"Can't Be Broken"	3:37
5.	"Scraping Up the Pieces"	2:49
Total length:		15:44

== Chart performance ==
Chart (2013)	Peak position
US Heatseekers Albums (Billboard)	7
US Independent Albums (Billboard)	46
