= Just Say Yes (EP) =

EP by the Narrative
- Released: August 30, 2008
- Recorded: 2007
- Genres: Indie pop; emo; alternative rock
- Length: 27:12
- Language: English
- Label: The Record Collective
- Producer: Bryan Russell

The Narrative chronology
Just Say Yes (2008)	The Narrative (2010)

Just Say Yes is the debut EP by the Narrative featuring six songs and produced by Bryan Russell. It was released independently on August 30, 2008.

== Background ==
[...] We didn't have any big ideas for our production and were really just excited about recording the songs we worked on. At that time we were both coming from a place heavily influenced by bands like Death Cab for Cutie and Jimmy Eat World.

— Gabriel, on the album.

The Narrative started the recordings of Just Say Yes on 2007 to 2008 after the band meeting through the Craiglist Ad, in the apartment of Suzie Zeldin. According with Jesse Gabriel, the band took influences of Death Cab for Cutie and Jimmy Eat World to compose the sound of the EP. The band was helped by Bryan Russell in the development of its sound and direction of recordings.

=== Promotion and release ===
Just Say Yes was released through the project The Record Collective on August 30, 2008. After its release, the EP was featured in the front page of Myspace and also on episodes of MTV's Reality TV Shows: Real World: Brooklyn and Real World: Cancun, Jersey Shore, TV Shows on MTV2, MTV's Canada Peak Season as well on VH-1, Nickelodeon's series Gigantic, TeenNick, National Geographic and Starz. They also received a very positive unsigned showcase on Absolutepunk.net, or Enemies Unsigned VIP Band and named in the AbsolutePunk Top 100.

== Critical reception ==
Professional ratings
Review scores
Source	Rating
AbsolutePunk	4/5 stars

The EP received positive reviews at AbsolutePunk.net "If you do not love Just Say Yes upon first listen, then odds are you will by your fifth (and onto your thirtieth) for certain, as dissecting these little pop gems is as fun as getting lost in their surface grandeur."

== Track listing ==
All tracks are written by Jesse Gabriel and Suzie Zeldin, some songs Bryan Russell helps.

No.	Title	Length
1.	"Castling"	4:19
2.	"The Moment That It Stops"	4:56
3.	"Eyes Closed"	4:30
4.	"Libra"	5:25
5.	"The Photographer's Daughter"	3:49
6.	"Waiting Room"	4:18
Total length:		27:12

== Personnel ==
The Narrative

- Suzie Zeldin – vocals, keys
- Jesse Gabriel – vocals, guitar

Technical and production

- Bryan Russell – producer at RedWire Audio
- Mike Kalajian – mastering
- Victoria Zeldin – backing Vocals
- Charles Seich – drums
- Brandon Strothman – bass
- Ted Feldman – cello

Visuals and imagery

- Laura Berger – designer
- Ian McAlister – art direction
- Danica Selvaggio – design concept

== Release history ==
Region	Date	Label	Format
South Korea	January 27, 2014	VIDA Records	Digital download
Worldwide	August 30, 2008	The Record Collective	CD, digital download
