= Twin Forks (band) =

American folk rock group

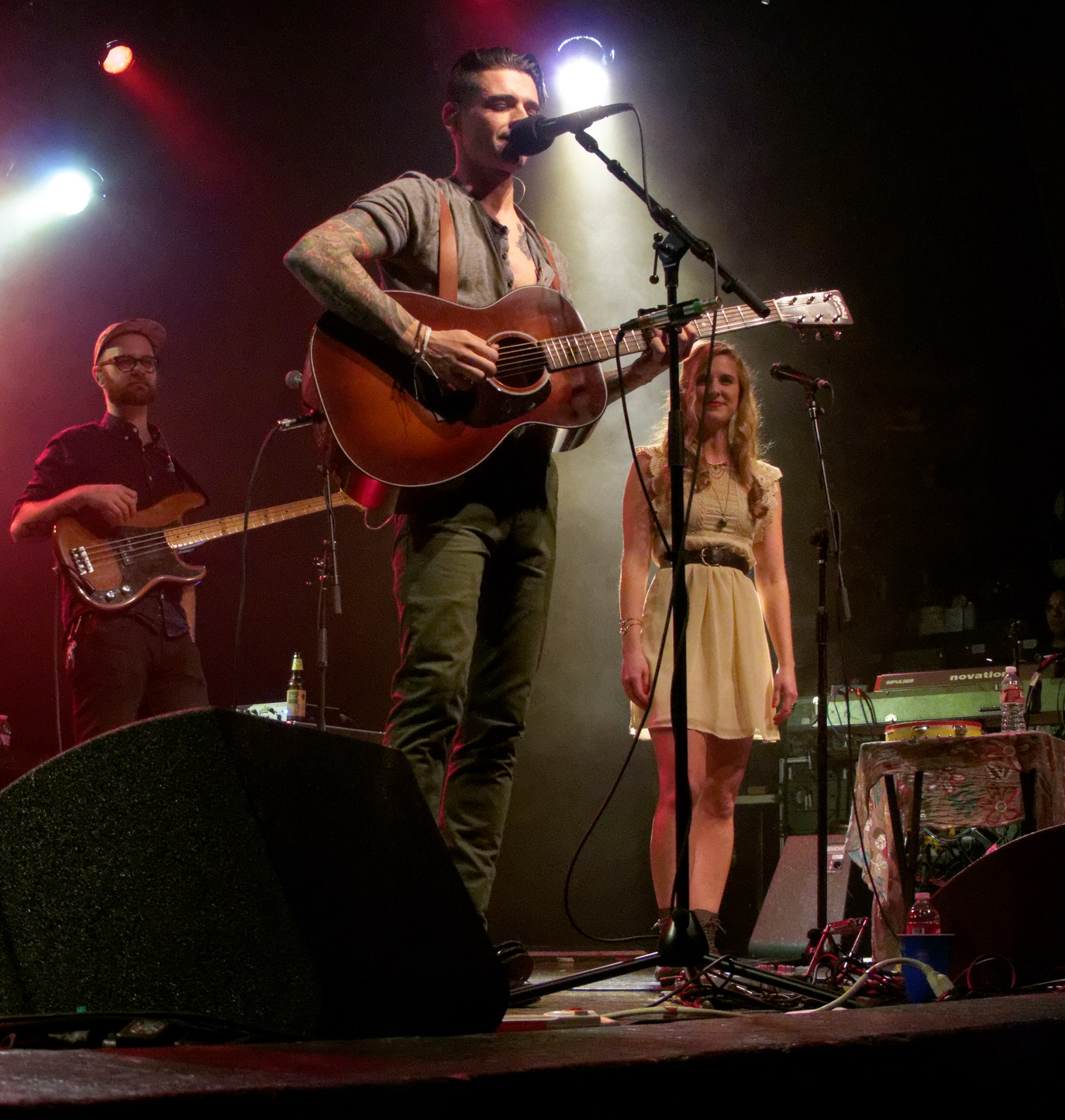
- Twin Forks performing in 2015

Background information
- Origin: Boca Raton, Florida, US
- Genres: Americana, folk rock
- Years active: 2011–present
- Label: Dine Alone
- Members: Chris Carrabba; Suzie Zeldin; Ben Homola; Jonathan Clark; Shawn Zorn; Dane Poppin; Sara Ellen; Kelsie Baronoski; Kimmy Baronoski

Twin Forks is an American Americana, folk rock band from Boca Raton, Florida, United States, started in 2011 by Chris Carrabba (Dashboard Confessional, Further Seems Forever). They are currently based out of Nashville. The band's current members are Chris Carrabba, Shawn Zorn, Dane Poppin, Kelsie Baron, and Sara Ellen. Twin Forks have released one EP, Twin Forks, and a full-length album, Twin Forks.

== History ==
=== Formation (2011–2012) ===
The band was formed in the wake of Chris Carrabba's desire to form a band based in classic folk, country and roots music.

Carrabba contacted Suzie Zeldin (the Narrative), Ben Homola (Bad Books) and Jonathan Clark to help in the production of his acoustic, solo album Covered in the Flood. Carrabba asked Zeldin to sing back-ups on his cover of "Long Monday", and Clark to help him record and produce it in his small studio. Carrabba and Homola had been talking about playing together for a while, so he invited the drummer to join the developing project. Twin Forks made their debut at the SXSW festival in March 2013. The band spent a year in a garage rehearsing to in order to develop the project and release a free EP.

Twin Forks was formed in the shadow of Dashboard Confessional's current touring hiatus, following an active period of over ten years. "I love Dashboard. I love Further. I love my bandmates in those bands, and I don't have any plans to not do those bands with those guys, but (Twin Forks) is where my heart is and where my creative reward is coming from right now," said Carrabba for an interview in Billboard regarding Dashboard and Further Seems Forever.

In mid-2013, Twin Forks released TOUR EP Vol. 1 as a free, four-song digital download EP. The band had previously offered this EP at their live shows since their debut.

Twin Forks evolved as a live band to include Sara Ellen on backing vocals, Kelsie Baron on mandolin and Shawn Zorn on drums. Kelsie Baron's sister Kimmy Baron performed with the band in 2014 but took time away to focus on her family.

=== Twin Forks EP (2013) ===
On September 17, 2013, Twin Forks released their first EP, Twin Forks on Dine Alone Records. It received positive reviews from Billboard and Alternative Press. The EP was premiered at Purevolume, streamed for free listening and a digital download of one song was distributed for free. Following the release of the EP, the band began a tour from September to the end of 2013. On January 1, 2014, Twin Forks announced plans to release their debut album.

The song "Back to You" from the self-titled EP was featured in the first episode of The CW series Reign.

=== Twin Forks (2014) ===
The band's self-titled debut album, Twin Forks was released on February 25, 2014, through Dine Alone Records. On February 20, USA Today premiered the album and listeners were allowed to stream it in its entirety.

== Style and influences ==
Twin Forks are most often described in the genres of country music-folk and Americana music, featuring combined male-female vocals. The band has cited their influences as old country artists, classic folk and roots music.

== Members ==
- Chris Carrabba – vocals and guitar
- Dane Poppin – bass
- Shawn Zorn – drums
- Kelsie Baron – vocals and mandolin
- Sara Ellen – vocals

== Discography ==
- Twin Forks EP (2013)
- Twin Forks LP (February 25, 2014)
