= Converted barn =

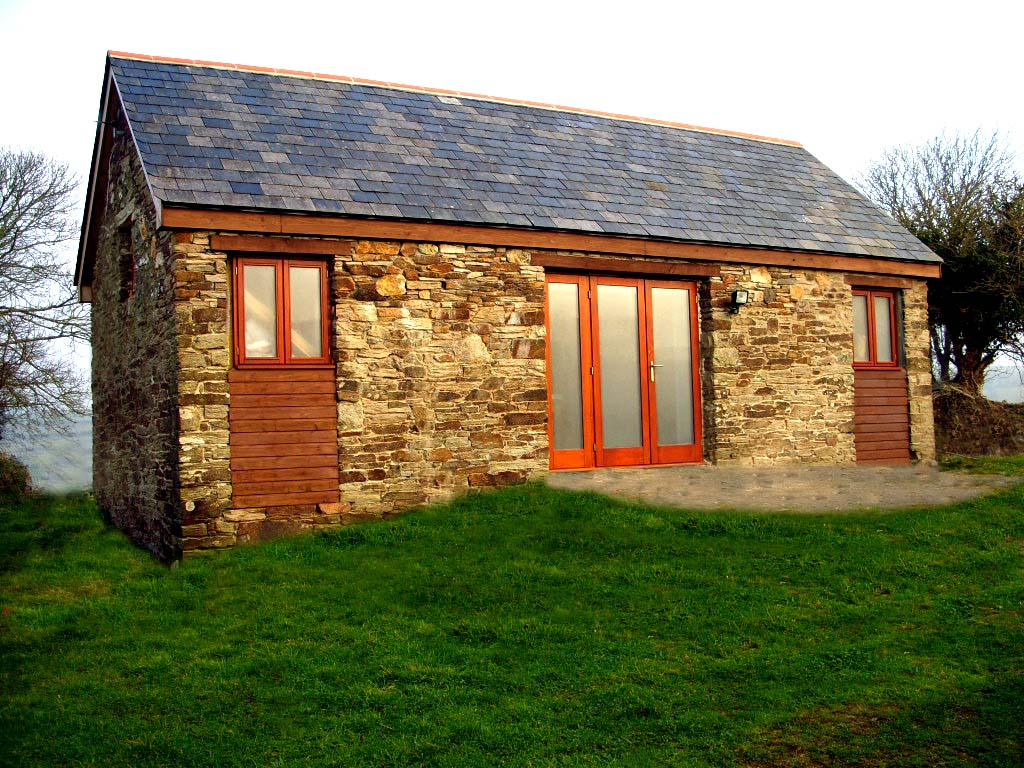
A converted barn

The conversion of barns involves the conversion of old farming barns to structures of commercial or residential use.

== Responsible residential conversion ==
According to the United States National Park Service, a medium-sized barn with sufficient extant windows where the internal volume can be near completely utilized can allow for a successful and historically responsible conversion of a barn.

== Criticism ==
While not a new phenomenon, barn conversion became quite popular in the waning years of the 20th century. Changing a barn over from its historic agricultural use to residential use generally requires significant changes in the integrity of the barn and if the structure is of historic value these alterations rarely preserve the historic character of the barn. As many older barn designs were relatively windowless one of the key additions in barn conversion for residential use is that of windows. For a barn to be comfortable as a home, walls often have to be insulated and refinished, and the interior volume of the space must be greatly reduced. Other residential details and fixtures are also added such as chimneys. The barn's site itself is often altered by the addition of close-in, driveway parking and residential landscaping. Some barn conversions go so far as to dismantle the entire original structure, discarding the exterior and simply reusing the internal structural supports on a new building.

== See also ==
- Barndominium
- Cottage
- Gîte
- Housebarn
- Renovation
