= The Narrative (album) =

Studio album by the Narrative
- Released: July 27, 2010
- Recorded: 2009 – 2010 at: Red Wire Audio; Dubway Studios
- Genre: Pop; Rock
- Length: 52:42
- Label: The Record Collective
- Producer: Bryan Russell; The Narrative

The Narrative chronology
Just Say Yes (2008)	The Narrative (2010)	Kickstarter EP (2011)

The Narrative is the debut studio album from the Narrative, released on July 27, 2010, through The Record Collective. The album was produced by Bryan Russell at RedWire Audio.

== Background ==
I think one of the nice things about how Suzie and I work when we write is that we just write what comes out. We're not looking to sound like anything or anyone else. We might say, "Hey, this part reminds me of this song. Maybe we can take it in that sort of a direction and it'd be cool," but we never start out trying to write a song like one that has already been written.

— Gabriel, on the album.

In 2008, The Narrative released their debut EP Just Say Yes. The EP received a successful promotion on MTV and MySpace.

Recordings of The Narrative began in 2009 while they performing at concerts and especially SXSW and CMJ showcases. The Narrative received a chance to feature the national campaign launched for Propellerhead called Record, used on its recordings. The album was produced by previous producer Bryan Russell. Originally, the album featured 15 songs, including "Magazines" and "Like a Prayer". "Magazines" was fused with "Starving for Attention", and "Like a Prayer" was never finished and recorded, being out of the track listing. The Narrative was officially released on July 27, 2010. After its release, the album was featured in the front page of Myspace U.S and PureVolume.com declaring them one of the "Top Unsigned Bands of 2010".

The album received reviews by Idolator, AbsolutePunk, Alter The Press, AltSounds who said, "Since the success of their 2008 EP, The Narrative have been touring the country and gaining a dedicated following. They began writing and recording their first full length in 2009 and are ready to impact today's music scene with a genuine record that strikes a balance between profound songwriting and catchy melodies" and a 3.5 stars review on Alternative Press.

The song "Fade" was featured later on the soundtrack of the Starz Media film The Chateau Meroux, released in 2012.

== Track listing ==
All tracks are written by Jesse Gabriel and Suzie Zeldin except where noted.

No.	Title	Writer(s)	Length
1.	"Fade"		3:31
2.	"Cherry Red"		4:11
3.	"Silence & Sirens"		4:24
4.	"Empty Space"	Zeldin; Gabriel; Bryan Russell	4:24
5.	"Winter's Coming"		5:00
6.	"You Will Be Mine"		4:11
7.	"Don't Want to Fall"		3:22
8.	"Trains"		3:28
9.	"Starving for Attention"		4:39
10.	"I've Been Thinking"		4:44
11.	"End All"		4:12
12.	"Hard to Keep Your Cool"		2:44
13.	"Turncoat"		4:20
Total length:			52:42

== Personnel ==
Adapted from album liner notes. The Narrative

- Suzie Zeldin – vocals, keys
- Jesse Gabriel – vocals, guitar

Additional musicians

- Charles Seich – drums, percussion, programing
- Ari Sadowitz – bass
- Will Noon – drum

Technical personnel

- Bryan Russell – producer (at RedWire Audio)
- Justin Long – assistant engineer
- Emily Lazar – mastering
- Joe LaPorta – mastering
- Bryan Laurenson – mixing on "Cherry Red"
- Jon Florencio – mixing on "Fade", "Empty Space" and "Winter's Coming"
- Mike Sapone – mixing on "Turncoat"
- Karen Preston – album art
- Kristina Casquarelli – layout

== Reception ==
=== Critical response ===
Professional ratings
Review scores
Source	Rating
Alternative Press	3.5/5 stars
AbsolutePunk	4.5/5 stars
Alter The Press!	4/5 stars
PropertyOfZack	5/5 stars

AbsolutePunk said, "If more records like The Narrative were written, I would most certainly have a different approach towards the genre. But I suppose the problem is that there aren't many bands as creative or talented as this one. The Narrative have without a doubt released the record of the year so far in this genre, and will surely be able to find fans wherever they find listeners."

Idolator said, "With the ability to switch between fun, happy-go-lucky tunes and soft, mournful melodies, this trio from New York is worth rocking out to. We have a feeling they could easily fit in with Pete Wentz's band of merry misfits on his Decaydance label, or score a sweet spot on an Alice In Wonderland-type soundtrack if given the chance."

Alternative Press wrote, "The Narrative is a bit lengthy (eight tracks are more than four minutes long), the craftsmanship the trio took into creating the album is evident. Hopefully this will be the last time the Narrative will have to self-release their music; labels, take notice."

Review Rinse Repeat wrote, "The Narrative have undoubtedly grown as a band since releasing Just Say Yes. Their self-titled album is an incredibly strong debut, laced with an abundance of wonderful songs, and a few slight, forgivable, missteps. From here, the world is in The Narrative's palm, they can only go on to bigger and better things."

Jesse Richmanc from PropertyOfZack wrote, "2010 has been a rough year for fans of melodic pop-rock with scene luminaries like Lydia, Mae and Copeland all taking their farewell bows. But sometimes a departure merely makes room for something new, exciting, potentially even better. New York trio The Narrative have rushed in to fill the void with their self-titled debut LP, a boldly confident album full of sparkling hooks and stunningly articulate emotional depth. With nary a dud track in the record's fifty engrossing minutes, co-founders/songwriters Jesse Gabriel and Suzie Zeldin have crafted one of the best albums of the year."

The American Creative wrote, "What a great release. A widely unknown band, with a beautifully written thirteen track disc, was given the chance to shine. It's hard to ever be compared to other female fronted bands like Paramore, States, and Versaemerge, but what separates The Narrative from those respected bands is their duo vocals, but the thing is... it works, and it works very well. Just a very well made disc, very catchy songs, and another one of those CDs that just goes well with a season."

Alter the Press wrote Long Island, New York trio the Narrative have been making subtle waves on several websites for the past few months and with their self-titled full-length, it's likely you could hear more from them, as it's a record that is filled with depth, variation and there are moments where the band sound extraordinary good.

== Release history ==
Region	Date	Label	Format
Worldwide	July 27, 2010	The Record Collective	Digital download
Worldwide	October 6, 2011	The Record Collective	Vinyl Limited Edition
