= Bleeders =

Bleeders may refer to:

- Bleeders (band), a hardcore band from New Zealand
  - The Bleeders (album), 2005
  - Bleeders (album), 2008
- Bleeders (film), a 1997 Canadian horror film
- "Bleeders", a song from The Wallflowers' 1996 album Bringing Down the Horse

== See also ==
- Bleeding (disambiguation)
