= Cute Without the 'E' (Cut from the Team) =

Single by Taking Back Sunday

from the album Tell All Your Friends
- Released: February 17, 2003
- Recorded: Big Blue Meenie, Jersey City
- Genre: Emo; post-hardcore
- Length: 3:31
- Label: Victory
- Songwriters: John Nolan; Adam Lazzara
- Producer: Sal Villanueva

Taking Back Sunday singles chronology
"Great Romances of the 20th Century" (2002)	"Cute Without the 'E' (Cut from the Team)" (2003)	"You're So Last Summer" (2003)

Music video
- "Cute Without the 'E' (Cut from the Team)" on YouTube

Audio sample
- file; help

"Cute Without the 'E' (Cut from the Team)" is a song by Taking Back Sunday. It is the third track on their debut album, Tell All Your Friends (2002). It was the first song released from the album, being posted online in February 2002. Though not originally intended to be a single, it was later issued to radio on February 17, 2003, as the album's second single. The video was directed by Christian Winters, who also directed the video for "Great Romances of the 20th Century" and "You're So Last Summer". Like the other songs on the album, it was written by vocalist Adam Lazzara and guitarist John Nolan. The song is regarded as a fan favorite.

== Background and composition ==
The origins of "Cute Without the 'E' (Cut from the Team)" trace back to a time the group visited frontman Adam Lazzara's father in North Carolina; the band had recently played a concert there. Although he was normally the band's drummer, Mark O'Connell was toying with an old classical guitar Lazzara had owned since childhood. He played a sequence of chords, which guitarist John Nolan heard and wanted to create a song with. It became the opening riff to "Cute Without the 'E' (Cut from the Team)". The track's name came from the band's friend Mike Duvan who commonly used the phrase "cut from the team". It opens with a four-chord guitar intro before shifting into single-note verses. Sonically, the band largely took influence from the Get Up Kids and the Promise Ring while creating the song.

The lyrics were written by Lazzara and Nolan. Like the other songs on the album, the pair would go to a diner near the apartment they shared to write lyrics, where they would trade notes taken from the rest of the band and compose a full song. The lyrics resulted from a relationship that Lazzara had recently left. He sarcastically refers to her as "princess" or "angel", bitterly complaining about what he saw as her being unfaithful to their relationship. Lazzara's ex-girlfriend was unaware he had written a song about her until after the track had already become popular in mid-2002. Nolan and Lazzara took rhythmic influence from rapper Jay-Z, specifically his then-latest album The Blueprint (2001), to help them fit as many lyrics in their verses as possible while remaining succinct. Genre-wise, the song has mainly been described as emo, but also as post-hardcore.

"Cute Without the 'E'" and the other songs on its parent album, Tell All Your Friends, were all recorded at Big Blue Meenie Recording Studio in Jersey City, New Jersey with producer Sal Villanueva. The sessions began in late December 2001, and concluded in early January 2002.

== Release ==
On February 21, 2002, "Cute Without the 'E' (Cut from the Team)" was posted online, alongside an announcement of the upcoming release of Tell All Your Friends. Originally, the song was not going to be released as a single; Nolan recalled that he did not believe anything they had created up to that point would be a viable single, and that his band even securing a recording contract "was about as far ahead as we could think in terms of what our band could do." Victory Records founder Tony Brummel had a different strategy to promote the album: Victory gave out 20,000 sampler albums at a cost of about $100,000; the operation targeted people in Chicago, New York City and Los Angeles. The main demographic consisted of those who were familiar with Victory or were general fans of emo music. Brummel considered this a better investment than attempting to gain radio airplay. Nevertheless, the song was eventually serviced to rock radio stations on February 17, 2003.

== Critical reception ==
"Cute Without the 'E' (Cut from the Team)" has been one of the most acclaimed songs in the band's discography, as well as emo music in general. Alternative Press' Jonathan Obenschain dubbed it the "quintessential track" of Tell All Your Friends, while Emma Garland at Vulture noted how the song was best representative of both the band's sonic and lyrical intentions, essentially serving as a "thesis statement" for the album. Billboard's Ilana Kaplan wrote that the song "basically helped popularize post-hardcore and emo to the public". Writing for IGN, Jesse Lord praised the band's execution on the song by harkening back to the roots of emo. At Rolling Stone, Gil Kaufman likened the vocal performances favorably to their peers in New Found Glory. Among fans, the song is regarded as a frequent favorite.

== Music video ==
A music video for "Cute Without the 'E' (Cut from the Team)" was published on Launch.com on December 10, 2002. The music video is based on the film Fight Club (1999), in turn based on the novel of the same name (1996) by Chuck Palahniuk. Originally, the concept of the video was a men-versus-women take on the film, with the two groups fighting in a basement, but Victory rejected the concept. Instead, Nolan plays as the unnamed narrator, while lead vocalist Lazzara plays the character's named alter ego, Tyler Durden. Scenes from the movie are re-enacted along with performance footage of the band cut in.

== Track listing ==
CD single
No.	Title	Length
1.	"Cute Without the 'E' (Cut from the Team)"	3:31

Bonus videos
No.	Title	Length
1.	"Cute Without the 'E' (Cut from the Team)" (Music video)
2.	"Cute Without the 'E' (Cut from the Team)" (Live video)

== Credits and personnel ==
Credits are adapted from the liner notes of Tell All Your Friends.

Taking Back Sunday
- Shaun Cooper – bass guitar
- Adam Lazzara – songwriter, co-lead vocals
- John Nolan – songwriter, co-lead vocals, lead guitar
- Mark O'Connell – drums, percussion
- Eddie Reyes – rhythm guitar
Additional personnel
- Sal Villanueva – producer, mixing
- Rumblefish – mixing
- Erin Farley – mixing engineer
- Tim Gilles – mastering engineer
- Arun Venkatesh – engineer

== Certifications ==
Certifications for "Cute Without the 'E' (Cut from the Team)"
Region	Certification	Certified units/sales
United Kingdom (BPI)	Silver	200,000^{‡}
^{‡} Sales+streaming figures based on certification alone.
