= Tell All Your Friends =

2002 studio album by Taking Back Sunday

Studio album by Taking Back Sunday
- Released: March 26, 2002
- Recorded: December 2001 – January 2002
- Studio: Big Blue Meenie (Jersey City)
- Genres: Emo; post-hardcore; pop-punk
- Length: 33:46
- Label: Victory
- Producer: Sal Villanueva

Taking Back Sunday chronology
Tell All Your Friends (2002)	Where You Want to Be (2004)

Singles from Tell All Your Friends
- 1. "Great Romances of the 20th Century" Released: March 12, 2002; 2. "Cute Without the 'E' (Cut from the Team)" Released: February 17, 2003; 3. "You're So Last Summer" Released: September 16, 2003

Tell All Your Friends is the debut studio album by American rock band Taking Back Sunday, released on March 26, 2002, through Victory Records. The album title comes from a line in the chorus of the album's second single "Cute Without the 'E' (Cut from the Team)".

Forming in 1999, the group underwent several lineup changes before settling on vocalist Adam Lazzara, guitarist and vocalist John Nolan, guitarist Eddie Reyes, bassist Shaun Cooper, and drummer Mark O'Connell. Taking Back Sunday released a five-song demo in early 2001, after which they toured the United States for most of the year. They rented a room in Lindenhurst, New York, where they wrote and demoed songs. In December 2001, the band signed with Victory Records; they began recording their debut album with producer Sal Villanueva at Big Blue Meenie Recording Studio in Jersey City, New Jersey.

"Great Romances of the 20th Century" was released as the lead single from Tell All Your Friends in March 2002. A few months later, Taking Back Sunday toured across the United States with Brand New and Rufio. At the end of the year, a Fight Club-inspired music video was released for "Cute Without the 'E' (Cut from the Team)", which was released as the album's second single in February 2003. The group spent the early part of 2003 touring with the Used and the Blood Brothers before headlining their own tour. After that, Nolan and Cooper left Taking Back Sunday and were replaced by Fred Mascherino and Matt Rubano. In September 2003, "You're So Last Summer" was released as the album's third single, and the band began co-headlining a tour with Saves the Day, which lasted until November 2003. By that point, a music video had been released for "You're So Last Summer".

Critics have given Tell All Your Friends mostly positive reviews, highlighting its mix of musical styles. It sold 2,000 copies in the first week after its release, charting at number 183 on the Billboard 200 chart. The album was certified gold by the Recording Industry Association of America (RIAA) in the US and had sold 790,000 copies as of 2009; in 2023, it was certified platinum. It is Victory Records' longest-running release on the Billboard Heatseekers Albums chart at 68 weeks, and on the Independent Albums chart at 78 weeks. In 2012, the band toured to celebrate the 10th anniversary of Tell All Your Friends, playing an acoustic set on the anniversary tour, which was later released in 2013 as the live album TAYF10 Acoustic. It has been included on lists of the best emo albums of all time by publications such as Alternative Press, NME, and Rolling Stone.

== Background ==
Guitarist Eddie Reyes became a staple of the New York hardcore scene, performing in various bands such as the Movielife. He contacted friends Antonio Longo and Steven DeJoseph; the former suggested adding his childhood friend, John Nolan, as a second guitarist. Bassist Jesse Lacey, who was childhood friends with Longo and Nolan, then joined, marking the formation of Taking Back Sunday in Amityville, New York, in November 1999. (Note: Nolan said the name was taken from the song "Taking Back Sunday" by the Waiting Process, with whom they were friends. Reyes expanded on this, saying that it related to how the band formed on a Sunday. Nolan mentioned that instead of telling this, Lazzara and Reyes would spread misinformation about the name being an obscure track by the Smiths, which bothered Nolan who was a fan of them.) After three-to-four months, Lacey left the band when Nolan reportedly romanced Lacey's girlfriend at a party, and later formed Brand New. Adam Lazzara saw Taking Back Sunday live and inquired if they needed a permanent bassist, and drove from his hometown of High Point, North Carolina to Long Island to practice with them. A month later, Reyes invited him to join them and move in with him. Mark O'Connell, who was friends with Reyes, was then asked to become their drummer.

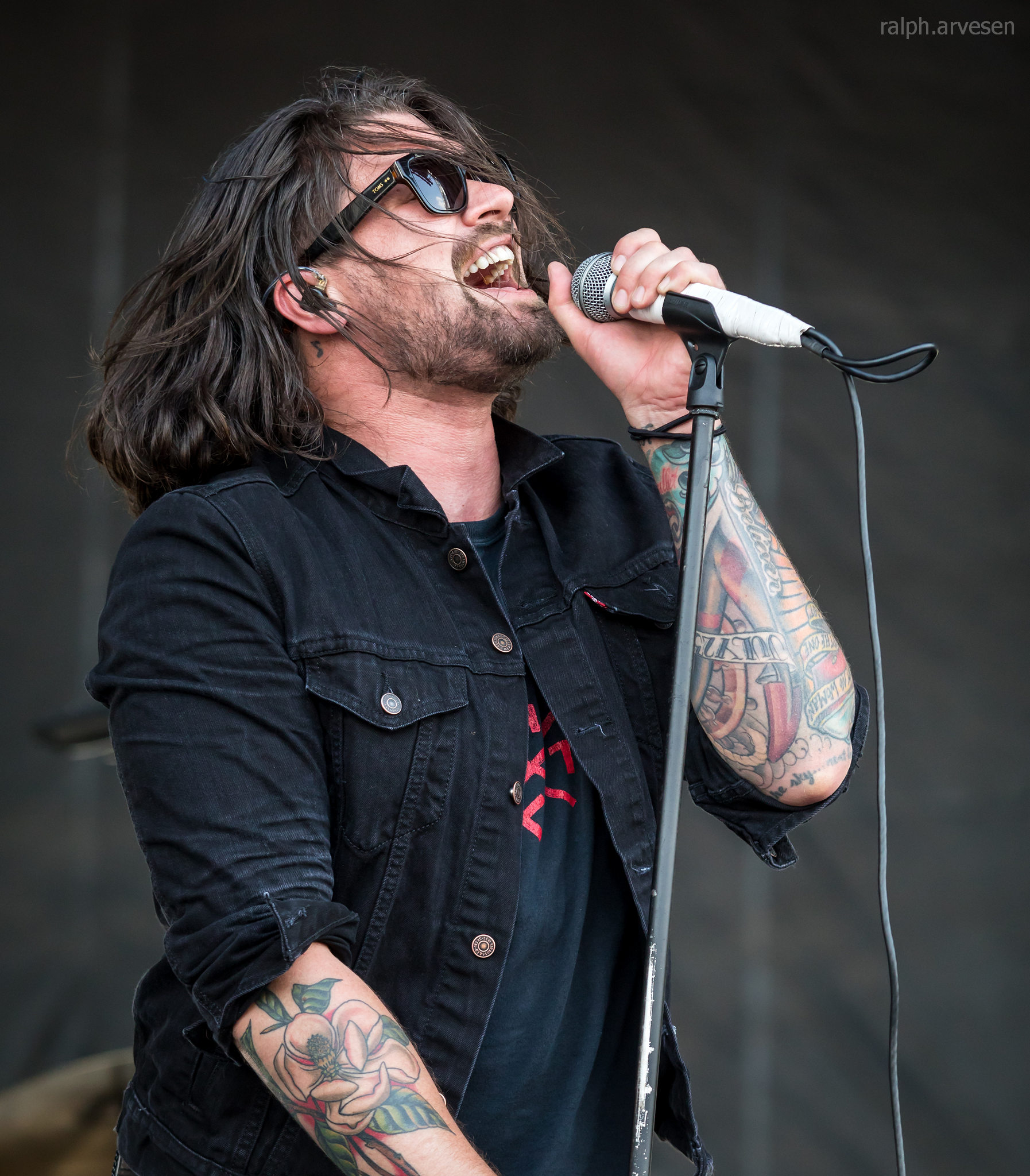
Adam Lazzara first joined Taking Back Sunday to play bass but eventually became their lead vocalist.

After recording their self-titled EP, Longo left the band; in December 2000, Lazzara switched from bass to lead vocals. O'Connell suggested recruiting bassist Shaun Cooper, who he knew from various acts throughout school, though the rest of the band needed convincing since they did not know him. In February 2001, the band recorded a five-song demo, appropriately titled Tell All Your Friends, copies of which were given to anyone associated with a record label. They embarked on their first tour with Northstar in July 2001. Taking Back Sunday then spent the rest of the year touring, during which they received offers from labels. Among these was one from Triple Crown Records, who were apprehensive as they had just signed Brand New. The band caught the attention of Victory Records; within two weeks of seeing them live, a contract was written up, and they signed to the label in December 2001.

== Production ==
Although other labels expressed interest in Taking Back Sunday, Victory Records encouraged them to make an album. Tell All Your Friends was recorded over a period of two weeks in December 2001 at Big Blue Meenie Recording Studio in Jersey City, New Jersey with producer Sal Villanueva. The band were not aware of him, but went with him at the insistence of Victory Records as he worked on Full Collapse (2001) by labelmates Thursday. Taking Back Sunday arrived without a drum set, presuming that the studio would have one. Engineer Tim Gilles said, "No major studio in America has their own [drum] set. You've gotta be fucking kidding me". The group spent each day driving from Long Island to Jersey City; as all of the members had day jobs, they had to request time off to record. Cooper collectively recorded his bass parts in four hours, spread over half a day. Villanueva would come up with ideas and suggest them to the band. Towards the end of tracking around Christmas, Lazzara became sick and lost his voice for two days. It resulted in the band having to miss one to two weeks of recording time. The sessions concluded in early January 2002, and ended up costing $10,000. Villanueva had contributed guitar work and co-mixed the recordings with Gilles (under the alias Rumblefish).

When the band heard the final mixes, they realized that the studio staff had altered the recordings, namely sounds had been manipulated and the guitar tones differed from how they were recorded. The piano intro to "The Blue Channel", which was initially slow, was sped up to match the tempo of the rest of the song, which was four times faster. Cooper said that the band was unhappy with these choices, and mentioned that the intro to "Great Romances of the 20th Century" was similarly altered from a piano to a synthesizer. The band wanted to make adjustments but were told they were over time and over budget for these changes to happen. They wanted to re-record "Your Own Disaster" from their demo, but were unable to due to time and money constraints. Instead, it was re-recorded for their second studio album, Where You Want to Be (2004). Engineering was handled by Gilles, Erin Farley, and Arun Venkatesh, with mastering by Gilles at Surgical Sound. Neil Rubenstein, who later became the group's tour manager, contributed vocals to "There's No 'I' in Team", "Timberwolves at New Jersey" and "Head Club". Nolan's sister, Michelle, sang on "Bike Scene" and "Ghost Man on Third", and Matt McDannell contributed vocals to "Head Club". Nolan suggested his sister as he was aware that she had "an amazing voice".

== Composition ==
=== Overview ===
[We] named it Tell All Your Friends, kind of in a half-joking manner, because we were very aware that any of our success was due to word of mouth and just people telling your friends.

— John Nolan in 2005 on the album's title

Tell All Your Friends's sound would later be described as emo, pop-punk and post-hardcore, drawing comparisons to Grade, Fugazi, the Movielife (specifically their 2000 album This Time Next Year), Weezer, and Thursday. A review from CMJ New Music Monthly noted that musically, the album sounded like "two guitars butt[ing] heads" to fuse "clean-channel pop melodies" with "chugging metal progressions". The vocals were reminiscent of Saves the Day, and the Canterbury Effect, often switching from singing to screaming. Around this time, emo bands the Get Up Kids and the Promise Ring influenced Taking Back Sunday. Lazzara and Nolan shared an apartment, often staying up talking until 5:00 am, and began showing each other compositions on which they were working. Rubenstein would often find them composing songs with acoustic guitars. (Note: Rubenstein, Lacey, Nolan and Lazzara were part of a songwriting collective known as the Long Island Band Pool. If a musician had a lyric they could not use, they suggested it to another member of the collective. Lazzara called it "a real communal thing happening at the time". Rubenstein contributed the lines "best bet worst ex" to "Bike Scene" and "Don't call my name out your window; I'm leaving" to "Head Club".)

Taking Back Sunday started jamming in a rehearsal room that Reyes had in Lindenhurst, New York, where they practiced and composed every night. The first song this lineup had written was "Great Romances of the 20th Century", which the members felt was better than anything they had done before, and that it sounded different from other Long Island acts, which were into pop and funk. The band frequently recorded demos; they wrote music together, while Lazzara and Nolan wrote the lyrics. One member would typically come up with a part, which the rest of the group would expand into a song. Nolan wrote a lot of material and had various ideas. He would cut parts and sections out of one song he had been working on and it would eventually end up in a Taking Back Sunday song. Many songs featuring Lazzara and Nolan use call-and-response vocals – something that Reyes' prior band Clockwise had done with their members Hanratty and George Fullan. When Reyes started Taking Back Sunday, he told Fullan that he wanted to include the dual vocals as it was something he really liked.

Personal experiences inspired Taking Back Sunday's lyrics. For Nolan, several instances filtered into his lyrics: the falling-out with Lacey, whom he had known all of his life, affected how Nolan felt and what he was trying to work through in his writings; the ending of a five-year long-term relationship since high school and the subsequent process of figuring who you are and what you want to be as a result; and coming to terms with his born again Christian upbringing and the realization that he did not believe in his life up to that point. Nolan and Lazzara had a concept where some of the lyrics could be read "like a play where one line is the boy and the next line is the girl ... Sometimes when you read the lyrics it's a little boring and it's more interesting this way". According to Nolan, about half of their song titles came from "sitting around late at night watching TV". The songs followed the structure of: quiet verse, loud bridge, big chorus, repeat, breakdown, chorus, ending. For almost every track, the breakdown consists of Lazzara and Nolan intertwining their vocal parts, crescendoing into screaming.

=== Tracks ===
"Cute Without the 'E' (Cut from the Team)"
According to Billboard, "Cute Without the 'E' (Cut from the Team)" helped bring post-hardcore and emo to a more public audience.

"You Know How I Do" is a mid-tempo track that opens with feedback, which shifts into Nolan's guitar part before the drums join in. A breakdown is heard later in the song, with bass accompaniment and contrasting vocal lines. "Bike Scene", another mid-tempo song, starts with palm-muted guitar parts. Nolan said its name was taken from American Thunder, which had an episode titled "Monterey Peninsula Bike Scene", while the lyrics were potentially inspired by him reading A Heartbreaking Work of Staggering Genius (2000) by Dave Eggers and Lazzara reading Fight Club (1996) by Chuck Palahniuk. The line "it's a campaign of distraction and revisionist history" is directly taken from Eggers' book, which was one of Nolan's favorite reads. Lazzara and O'Connell came up with the opening riff for "Cute Without the 'E' (Cut from the Team)" while at Lazzara's father's house in North Carolina. Nolan suggested it be expanded into a full song after it was brought into practice sessions. The lyrics resulted from a relationship that Lazzara had recently left; an underlying theme of betrayal is present. The track's name came from the band's friend Mike Duvan who said the phrase "cut from the team". It opens with a four-chord guitar intro before shifting into single-note verses.

The Nolan–Lacey romancing incident inspired Brand New to include "Seventy Times 7" on their debut album, Your Favorite Weapon (2001). Nolan wrote about the event from his point of view in Taking Back Sunday's "There's No 'I' in Team". The track also includes a reference to Brand New's "Mixtape". (Note: Lacey had become hostile towards Lazzara and Taking Back Sunday. This situation, according to Alternative Press, "spawned one of the most public intra-band rivalries in emo history". It has been suggested that Brand New's "Mixtape" and Taking Back Sunday's "Timberwolves at New Jersey" are, in-part, about the incident. The feud has been viewed as overblown: to begin with Nolan received a thank-you credit in the liner notes for Your Favorite Weapon, and the same for Lacey in the liner notes for Tell All Your Friends. Additionally, Lacey joined Taking Back Sunday onstage for a combined performance of "Seventy Times 7" and "There's No 'I' in Team" in 2002. Subsequent allusions to the feud include Brand New shirts that reference Lazzara's fondness of microphone swinging during shows, to which Taking Back Sunday retorted with shirts that double-downed on the swinging aspect. However, in 2015, Lazzara described Lacey as "a dick. He just sucks. He's not a good person.") "Great Romances of the 20th Century" includes an audio sample from the film Beautiful Girls (1996), and opens with an electronic string line. It shifts into mid-tempo, accompanied by flange-effected and distorted electric guitars backed by frantic drum and bass lines. The track was named after a show on the A&E network, while its lyrics discuss two lovers separating. "Ghost Man on Third" is an emo ballad that focuses on Lazzara's difficulty with mental health, specifically coping with depression at an early age. During the song's chorus, Lazzara said he does his "best Daryl Palumbo [of Glassjaw] impression" and electronic strings are heard.

"Timberwolves at New Jersey" talks about being a musician in the New Jersey emo/post-hardcore scene, while of some lyrics take digs at former band members. Kevin Craft of PopMatters interpreted it as someone trying to console their friend, who is inexperienced at romance: "The would-be suitor must improve the verses he’s using in his attempts at courtship if he wants to have any shot at impressing girls who favor 'literate boys'". The title for "You're So Last Summer" came from the time Lazzara and Nolan went to the movies with their friend Sarah. As the trio left the theater, someone said something and Sarah replied, "You're so last summer" – meaning late to the party. "The Blue Channel" was named after Channel 14, which consisted of TV program listings. The song opens with a piano intro; Lazzara said it and "Head Club" were songs the band used "to get enough songs to fill a record so we could go on tour". "Head Club" is about Nolan being exhausted with writing about Lacey after the romancing incident. The name of the bonus track, "The Ballad of Sal Villanueva", is a tribute to the album's producer Sal Villanueva. It was recorded after they had finished working on the album.

== Release ==
=== Initial promotion, and Nolan and Cooper's departures ===
On February 21, 2002, the release date for Tell All Your Friends was announced as March, and "Cute Without the 'E' (Cut from the Team)" was posted online. A music video for "Great Romances of the 20th Century" directed by Christian Winters, a friend of the band, was released on March 4. Winters made the video before the group signed with Victory Records; the record company enjoyed it. The song was distributed to radio stations on March 12, 2002; Tell All Your Friends was released on March 26, 2002. John Clark shot the cover art, which featured the number 152, alluding to a gas station Lazzara and his friends would stop at Exit 152 off Interstate 40 in Mebane, North Carolina. The back cover is a photograph of the exit sign. (Note: The album's liner notes give a shout-out to Northstar, claiming them to be the "greatest band ever". Lazzara and Nolan had introduced them as such during one live performance, and as a result, the quote was featured on the promotional sticker for Northstar's Is This Thing Loaded? (2002). The pair were unaware of this until it was released, but were enthusiastic about it.) The vinyl version included the bonus track "The Ballad of Sal Villanueva". To promote the album, Victory founder Tony Brummel targeted people who were familiar with the label and also emo fans. In Chicago, Illinois, New York City and Los Angeles, California, Victory gave out 20,000 sampler albums at a cost of about $100,000; Brummel considered this a better investment than attempting to gain radio airplay. RED Distribution, who handled distribution for Victory, was aware that the group did not have radio play and began posting about the album on emo websites. A Yahoo! Group with over 1,300 fans could download demos of "Bike Scene" and "Head Club", which was hoped would increase sales. (Note: A promotional sticker on the front cover of the album specifically compared it to the likes of Dashboard Confessional, Jimmy Eat World, and Thursday. Nolan thought it was a bad idea as it would be the first thing potential buyers saw: "Obviously I have no problem with any of those bands, but I just can't imagine being in any of them and seeing that—it just seems so cheesy.") TV commercials aired on the relatively new channels MTV2 and Fuse.

While in Los Angeles, Midtown frontman Gabe Saporta visited Jillian Newman. He had been sent a package of Victory Records' releases by a friend and was playing them in Newman's office. The only one that grabbed her attention was Tell All Your Friends; she asked what it was. She subsequently watched the band at the SXSW music conference; by June 2002, she started managing them. On December 10, 2002, a music video was released for "Cute Without the 'E' (Cut from the Team)" on Launch.com. The video, conceived and directed by Winters, was inspired by the 1999 film Fight Club (a favorite of Nolan and Lazzara). Lazzara's original idea for the video had men fighting women, which was rejected by Winters and Victory before Lazzara and Winters expanded it in the final version. The song was released to rock radio stations on February 17, 2003.

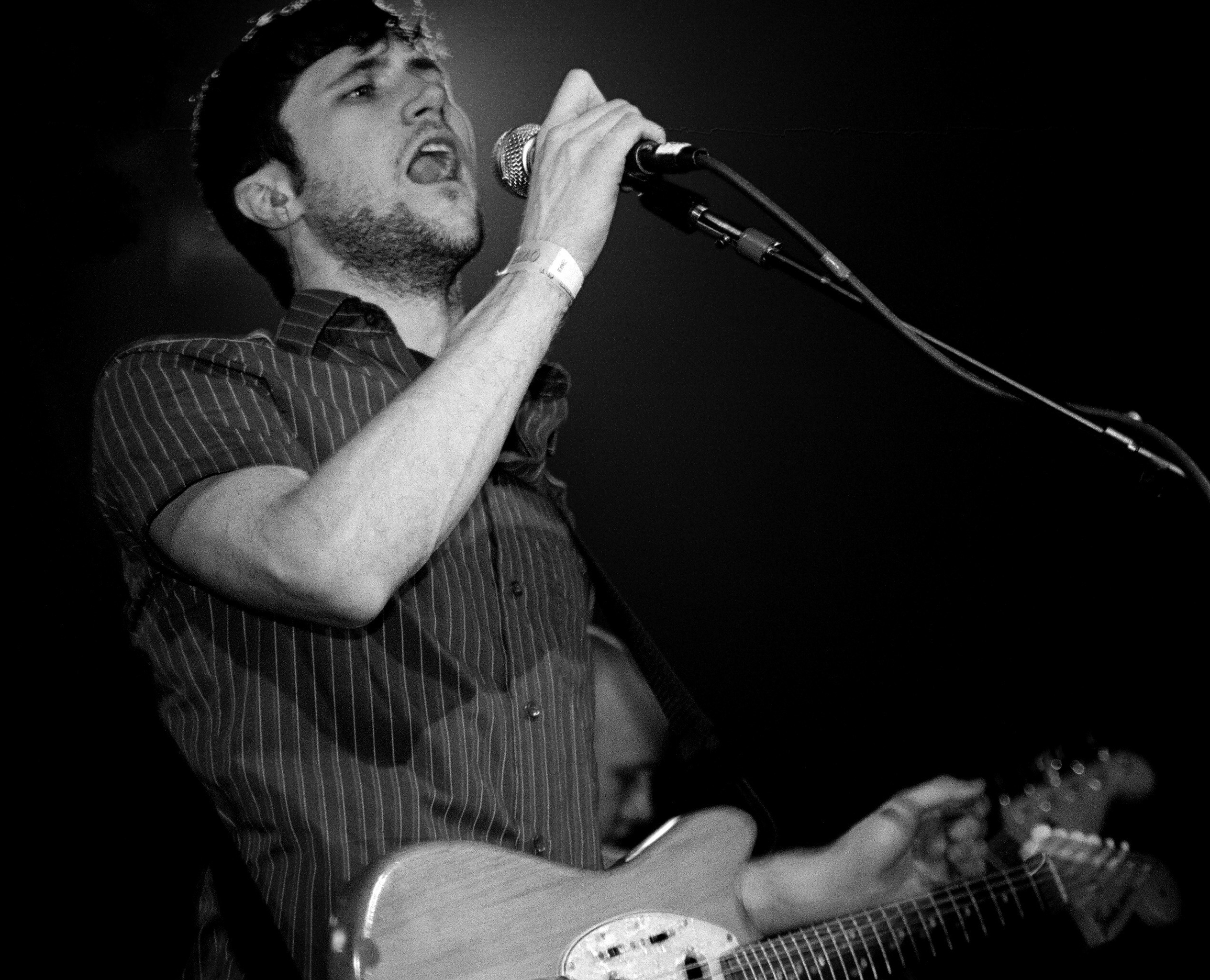
John Nolan (pictured) left the band in 2003 alongside bandmate Shaun Cooper; the two then formed Straylight Run.

Lazzara was suffering from a drinking problem around this time and cheated on Michelle Nolan, who he had been dating for a while. The rest of the band members had quit drinking by the end of 2002; Lazzara resented this. He was constantly in a bad mood and declined any help with his drinking. Cooper felt this drove a wedge between them. Lazzara kept regular contact with Michelle and told her he was going to change his ways. After playing Skate & Surf Festival in late April 2003, Lazzara apologized to Nolan later that evening. However, when Lazzara was unaware Nolan was on the tour bus, he claimed he had joked about the whole thing and did not take it seriously. The following day, Nolan told Cooper that he was leaving the band; Cooper had been mulling over the decision too, and decided he did not want to be in the band without Nolan. A day later, the pair told the rest of the band.

According to Lazzara, Nolan and Cooper were "having trouble because everything was happening so fast. Going from being home [...] to being gone all the time and having your whole life consumed and almost defined by the band that you’re in is a lot to handle". Though he initially cited exhaustion from touring, Nolan later revealed there was constant fighting within the group, with each member feeling they were not receiving enough credit for the group's success. In addition, he felt he and Lazzara had grown apart as friends. The band's scheduled appearance on Jimmy Kimmel Live! and a stint on Warped Tour were canceled. A week after the departures, a meeting was held while Nolan was moving from the place he shared with Lazzara. The band attempted to talk out their problems, but the meeting resulted in Nolan storming out. Nolan and Cooper formed Straylight Run with Michelle and Breaking Pangaea drummer Will Noon and subsequently ceased contact with all the members of Taking Back Sunday except O'Connell. (Note: The meeting served as the last time Nolan spoke to Lazzara in seven years. Nolan and Cooper later returned to Taking Back Sunday in March 2010.)

=== New lineup and later promotion ===
Taking Back Sunday underwent a short period where they were unsure what to do next, and even briefly considered breaking up. The band was due to tour the United Kingdom with Brand New in May and June 2003; however, all the shows were canceled because of rumors of the band breaking up. (Note: Brand New later toured the UK with Straylight Run supporting them in January 2004.) Taking Back Sunday issued a statement, explaining that: "There have been a series of personal events with members of the band [...] We need very much to take a step back at this time". Reyes moved in with his girlfriend and toyed with the idea of taking the band name and restarting with an all-new lineup. He kept calling Cooper, Nolan and O'Connell in an attempt to reconcile. Two months had passed before O'Connell contacted Lazzara and decided to continue the band. Reyes received a call out of the blue from Breaking Pangaea frontman Fred Mascherino, whom he had known for years. Mascherino subsequently auditioned for Nolan's place; on August 5, 2003, it was announced that Mascherino was a member of the band.

Bassist Matt Rubano, who grew up with O'Connell, then joined the group. O'Connell had asked Rubano to audition, but he was hesitant initially, since he was not a fan of emo music or aware of the band; however, he bought the album and learned Cooper's parts. On August 12, 2003, the band appeared on IMX. On September 16, 2003, "You're So Last Summer" was released as a radio single. In November 2003, a music video for the track was filmed at Fulton Park in New York City. The video, directed by Winters, debuted on MTV on November 24. In the video, the band performs while Public Enemy vocalist Flavor Flav (in full regalia) jumps around. According to Lazzara, the group was making fun of itself: "We had two guys leave our band and there were two main singers, so we were trying to think of a way to bring the new band members into the video, but not have Fred singing the old guy’s part. And the funniest way to do that was to use Flavor Flav." On December 3, 2003, the band appeared on IMX again.

== Touring ==
After receiving a $10,000 advance from Victory Records, Taking Back Sunday purchased a van and trailer for touring. In January 2002, the band toured with Rival Schools. For three weeks beginning in mid-March 2002, Taking Back Sunday participated in the Victory Records tour alongside Catch 22, Grade, Student Rick and Reach the Sky. In April and May 2002, the band started their first full tour of the United States supporting the Lawrence Arms. This trek also included appearances at the Skate & Surf and Purgatory festivals. During the first show of the tour, most of the crowd dispersed when the Lawrence Arms came on as Taking Back Sunday became the main draw. The band then toured that summer supporting Brand New, alongside Rufio. The tour had been in the works since the end of 2001; by that point, Nolan and Lacey had not spoken in around a year. Nolan viewed it as a sign that Lacey wanted to rebuild their friendship. After a week or two of the tour being underway, Taking Back Sunday joined Brand New onstage during their performances of "Seventy Times 7", and Lacey returned the favor for "There's No 'I' in Team".

In addition, shows were often sold out and being upgraded to bigger venues, which would sell out. When this occurred, the group was given extra money. Nolan said: "And it was the first time we actually came home and had money, like we made money from the tour." Until this point, the members would have gone back to work as soon as tours finished. Nolan said it was a "really big one for me [...] like, 'Wow, I'm not like just struggling to get by right now, we are actually kind of making a living doing this'". In September 2002, they toured with Midtown and Recover on The Best Revenge Tour. Four shows into the tour, Lazzara fell off the stage and gashed his face in two places and dislocated his hip. The incident forced the group to drop out of the tour. At the end of 2002, Taking Back Sunday toured with the Starting Line and Northstar. The band opened 2003 touring with the Used and the Blood Brothers, and headlined the Takeover Tour in March and April 2003, with main support from From Autumn to Ashes and Recover; Breaking Pangaea, Somehow Hollow, My Chemical Romance and Count the Stars appeared on select dates. Taking Back Sunday played on three 2003 Warped Tour shows, leading up to an appearance at Furnace Fest, which they headlined. On September 9, 2003, the band performed on Jimmy Kimmel Live. From September to November 2003, Taking Back Sunday co-headlined a tour with Saves the Day, supported by Moneen. On November 11, 2003, the band appeared on Last Call with Carson Daly.

== Critical reception ==
Original release
Review scores
Source	Rating
AllMusic	4/5 stars
Drowned in Sound	4.5/5 stars
IGN	7.9/10
Rolling Stone	3/5 stars

Tell All Your Friends was met with a mostly positive critical reception. Several reviewers took notice of how Taking Back Sunday executed the emo sound on Tell All Your Friends. AllMusic reviewer Kurt Morris said Taking Back Sunday's "ability ... to sound so blatantly" like the Movielife was "almost their undoing". He found them "a bit more rockin'" than the Movielife, having blended punk, hardcore, emo, and pop in a more successful fashion. Chart Attack reviewer Steve Servos praised the band's quiet-loud dynamic approach, and noted that Lazzara's ability to switch easily from singing to screaming despite his "somewhat raspy voice" set it apart as a release that would "rival any emo record to come out for some time". Rolling Stone's Gil Kaufman lauded how the album made the band sound unique among their emo peers, many times averting from "sad-sack emo pitfalls" into "pop-infused hardcore" and "enlightened, dramatic lyrics" describing "heartache that teeter[s] between despondency and dark vengeance". Peter White of Drowned in Sound enthusiastically noted that the album, which featured "nihilistic" pop songs that often employed "monster riffs" and screams similar to Obituary, would be a landmark of a new musical movement, with the potential to shift nu metal bands such as Limp Bizkit out of the mainstream in favor of emo. Kludge writer Ben Rayner applauded the band's overall execution of the "emo-punk blueprint", and noted that it would appeal to fans of Saves the Day and the Movielife.

Despite praise for Taking Back Sunday's musical approach on Tell All Your Friends, some reviewers gave the album criticism for being too similar to other emo recordings around the time of its release. While Morris was mostly pleased with the release, he criticized the originality of the album's material, and Servos noted a "cookie cutter" emo sound present. Stuart Green of Exclaim! wrote positively of the release, but that while the album was "a spirited and well-produced" work, it arrived at a time when the presence of the music scene it belonged to was growing so rapidly that the album failed to stand out. While BBC Music's Olli Siebelt echoed this concern, he also credited the band with making an effort to stand out by including influences from post-punk, nu metal and hardcore punk. According to Siebelt, Taking Back Sunday composed songs which were both "upbeat and emotionally aggressive". Siebelt compared the album to All and the Descendents, saying that it retained "enough of its own identity" to lift the band above its peers.

== Commercial performance ==
Before its release, Juarbe thought Tell All Your Friends was good but was unsure how it would do commercially. At the time, all of Victory's releases were gauged against Thursday, who had sold around 100,000 copies of their releases. Although it was reported that 15,000 copies had been shipped, only 2,000 copies were sold in the album's first week of release. At the time, this was the biggest opening week for a new artist on Victory. The album spent one week (at number 183) on the Billboard 200, and 68 weeks on the Heatseekers Albums chart, peaking at number nine. It spent 78 weeks on the Independent Albums chart, peaking at number eight, and peaked at number 23 on the Catalog Albums chart. It reached number 10 on the Independent Albums Year-end chart in 2003.

Despite little airplay, Tell All Your Friends had sold 110,000 copies by March 2003; near the end of the year, sales stood at 252,000. By April 2004 the album had sold nearly 400,000 copies, and by September 2005 it was certified gold by the RIAA. In June 2023, the album reached platinum status. By May 2009, the album had sold 790,000 copies in the US, eventually selling one million copies worldwide. Tell All Your Friends is Taking Back Sunday and Victory Records' bestselling release. It would also become Victory's longest-running record on the Billboard Heatseekers and Independent Albums charts. "Great Romances of the 20th Century" charted at number 33 on UK Rock & Metal Singles chart in 2011.

== Legacy ==
Retrospective reviews
Review scores
Source	Rating
AbsolutePunk	92%
Alternative Press	5/5 stars
Pitchfork	8.0/10
Sputnikmusic	5/5

=== Best-of lists, influence and retrospective reviews ===
Drowned in Sound included the album on their list of top albums of 2002. According to Alternative Press's Philip Obenschain, Tell All Your Friends "has remained one of the scene's most celebrated and influential releases". Despite its "not be[ing] their best sounding, most mature or highest in ambition ... it's Tell All Your Friends's intangible and emotionally charged energy, the uncertainty, the earnestness and the rough edges that make it so special". The album was included in Rock Sound's 101 Modern Classics list at number 13, and the magazine considered it "[t]he Hybrid Theory of emo". They later ranked it at number 35 on the list of best albums in their lifetime. Billboard said "Cute Without the 'E' (Cut from the Team)" "basically helped popularize post-hardcore and emo to the public". Austin Saalman of Under the Radar said the album was a "central influence" on the third wave of emo, "which soon unfolded and ultimately dominated '00s popular culture". Tell All Your Friends has been included on several best-of emo album lists by A.Side TV, Alternative Press, Houston Press, Junkee, NME, and Rolling Stone, as well as by journalists Leslie Simon and Trevor Kelley in their book Everybody Hurts: An Essential Guide to Emo Culture (2007). Similarly, "Cute Without the 'E' (Cut from the Team)" appeared on a best-of emo songs list by Vulture, while Loudwire included "There's No 'I' in 'Team" on their own list. Alternative Press included "You're So Last Summer" and "Cute Without the 'E' (Cut from the Team)" at numbers 81 and 5, respectively, on their list of the best 100 singles from the 2000s. Brandon McMaster of the Crimson Armada cited the album as an influence, while Derek Sanders, lead vocalist of Mayday Parade, has expressed admiration for it. CMJ New Music Monthly writer Andrew Bonazelli predicted that the record would be "a solid bet for the future of rock radio [...] Should pimp-metal eventually go the way of the grunge or glam-rock dodo, the masses' ears just might be taken back by Taking Back Sunday." (Note: Rather than glam rock, Bonazelli may actually be referring to glam metal, whose mainstream popularity was replaced by grunge. Nu metal, which had seen mainstream success through the 1990s, indeed began to fade by this time, and emo would become a mainstream fixture in music by the summer of 2002.)

Chris Collum wrote for AbsolutePunk that Tell All Your Friends "grabs the listener's attention from the start" and the album expressed "feelings that are completely genuine, not contrived, rehearsed or formulaic, without being over-the-top or sappy". Collum called Lazzara and Nolan's vocal delivery "rapid-fire" in a "back-and-forth way, as if they were carrying on a dialogue, [that] allows you to really attach to and get a sense of the raw emotion behind the songs". In a retrospective review for Alternative Press, Brendan Manley wrote that the album "is as close as it gets to a modern masterpiece, capturing not just a band at their apex, but an entire scene". According to Manley, Tell All Your Friends was "the crossover breaking point, finally bringing what had been percolating for years in East Coast VFW Halls to the attention of the masses". Channing Freeman of Sputnikmusic wrote that the album features "power chords and clean strums and palm muting and reverb". About whether this was negative, Freeman said, "With songs this good, it shouldn't be ... It's all here, solid and undeniably catchy." Jonathan Bradley wrote for Stylus that although the album "is notable not so much for being a blueprint as it is a playbook", it would "provide the perfect How-To guide for teenagers with guitars all over the United States and beyond".

=== Related releases, members' opinions and anniversary celebrations ===
A CD/DVD version of the album was released in November 2005. The CD included "The Ballad of Sal Villanueva" and an acoustic version of "Cute Without the 'E' (Cut from the Team)" as bonus tracks; live acoustic versions of "You Know How I Do" and "Cute Without the 'E' (Cut from the Team)", and an interview as enhanced content. The DVD featured the music videos to "Cute Without the 'E' (Cut from the Team)", "You're So Last Summer", "Great Romances of the 20th Century" and "Timberwolves at New Jersey". Four of the album's tracks were included as part of the Notes from the Past compilation in 2007. Tell All Your Friends was performed live in its entirety at Bamboozle 2011. In a 2011 interview with CMJ, Lazzara and Nolan chose the album's final track ("Head Club") as their least-favorite Taking Back Sunday song. In 2015, Lazzara said that he disliked his vocals on the album: "I was just yelling everything hoping it fit in there somehow, trying to paint with some strange color."

To celebrate Tell All Your Friends's 10th anniversary, the band toured the US in October and November 2012 with support from Bayside. In November, the album charted on the Billboard Vinyl Albums chart, peaking at number eight. In June 2013, the band released a live acoustic version of the album and a companion film, TAYF10 Acoustic. The recordings were made in Los Angeles and Chicago. In September, the band performed two electric versions of the album in New Jersey. TAYF10 Acoustic and TAYF10: Live from Starland Ballroom were released as a double-DVD set in December, and TAYF10 Acoustic was released on vinyl. In 2014, Cooper said that Warner Bros. wanted the group to re-record Tell All Your Friends during the Taking Back Sunday (2011) sessions; Cooper replied to them, "Are you nuts?" Throughout 2019, the band performed Tell All Your Friends in its entirety for their 20th anniversary world tour. To help promote the tour, a career-spanning compilation Twenty (2019) was released, which included "Cute Without the 'E' (Cut from the Team)", "You're So Last Summer" and "Timberwolves at New Jersey" from Tell All Your Friends. A remastered version of Tell All Your Friends was released on vinyl in 2019; a 20th anniversary edition was released on May 27, 2022.

== Track listing ==
All music written by Taking Back Sunday. All lyrics written by Adam Lazzara and John Nolan. All recordings produced by Sal Villanueva.

Tell All Your Friends standard edition track listing
No.	Title	Length
1.	"You Know How I Do"	3:21
2.	"Bike Scene"	3:35
3.	"Cute Without the 'E' (Cut from the Team)"	3:31
4.	"There's No 'I' in Team"	3:48
5.	"Great Romances of the 20th Century"	3:35
6.	"Ghost Man on Third"	3:59
7.	"Timberwolves at New Jersey"	3:23
8.	"The Blue Channel"	2:30
9.	"You're So Last Summer"	2:59
10.	"Head Club"	3:01

Victory Records vinyl-only bonus track
No.	Title	Length
11.	"The Ballad of Sal Villanueva"	3:52

Reissue CD bonus tracks
No.	Title	Length
11.	"The Ballad of Sal Villanueva"	3:52
12.	"Cute Without the 'E' (Cut from the Team)" (acoustic)	4:26
13.	"You Know How I Do" (live acoustic video) (enhanced material)
14.	"Cute Without the 'E' (Cut from the Team)" (live acoustic video) (enhanced material)
15.	"Exclusive interview with original members" (video) (enhanced material)

Reissue DVD
No.	Title	Length
1.	"Cute Without the 'E' (Cut from the Team)" (music video)	3:33
2.	"You're So Last Summer" (music video)	3:07
3.	"Great Romances of the 20th Century" (music video)	3:36
4.	"Timberwolves at New Jersey" (music video)	3:34

20th Anniversary Edition bonus tracks
No.	Title	Length
11.	"Great Romances of the 20th Century" (demo)	3:43
12.	"The Blue Channel" (demo)	2:43
13.	"Bike Scene" (demo)	3:43
14.	"Mutual Head Club" (demo)	3:24

== Personnel ==
Personnel per booklet and back cover.

=== Taking Back Sunday ===
- Shaun Cooper – bass guitar
- Adam Lazzara – lead vocals
- John Nolan – lead guitar, keyboard, vocals
- Mark O'Connell – drums, percussion
- Eddie Reyes – rhythm guitar

=== Additional musicians ===
- Neil Rubenstein – vocals (tracks 4, 7, and 10)
- Michelle Nolan – vocals (tracks 2 and 6)
- Matt McDannell – vocals (track 10)
- Sal Villaneuva – additional guitar

=== Production ===
- Sal Villanueva – producer, mixing
- Michele Logo – photography
- John Clark – front cover artwork
- Adam Lazzara – back tray photo
- Patrick Larson – layout
- Rumblefish – mixing
- Erin Farley – engineer
- Tim Gilles – engineer, mastering
- Arun Venkatesh – engineer

== Charts ==
=== Weekly charts ===
Chart performance for the original release of Tell All Your Friends
Chart (2002–04)	Peak position
US Billboard 200	183
US Top Catalog Albums (Billboard)	23
US Heatseekers Albums (Billboard)	9
US Independent Albums (Billboard)	8

Chart performance for the reissue of Tell All Your Friends
Chart (2012)	Peak position
US Vinyl Albums (Billboard)	8

=== Year-end charts ===
Year-end chart performance for Tell All Your Friends
Chart (2003)	Position
US Billboard Independent Albums Year-end	10

== Certifications ==
Certifications for Tell All Your Friends
Region	Certification	Certified units/sales
United States (RIAA)	Platinum	1,000,000

== Bibliography ==
=== Books ===
- Azerrad, Michael (1994). Come as You Are: The Story of Nirvana. New York City, New York: Doubleday. ISBN 0-385-47199-8.
- Greenwald, Andy (2003). Nothing Feels Good: Punk Rock, Teenagers, and Emo. New York City, New York: St. Martin's Griffin. ISBN 978-0-312-30863-6.
- Sharpe-Young, Garry (2005). New Wave of American Heavy Metal (1st ed.). New Plymouth, New Zealand: Zonda Books. ISBN 9780958268400.
- Simon, Leslie; Kelley, Trevor (2007). Everybody Hurts: An Essential Guide to Emo Culture. New York City, New York: HarperEntertainment. ISBN 978-0-06-119539-6.
- Simon, Leslie (2009). Wish You Were Here: An Essential Guide to Your Favorite Music Scenes―from Punk to Indie and Everything in Between. New York City, New York: Harper. ISBN 978-0-06-157371-2.

=== Magazines and AV media ===
- Bonazelli, Andrew (May 2002). "Reviews". CMJ New Music Monthly. No. 101. ISSN 1074-6978.
- CMJ (June 22, 2011). CMJ TV: Taking Back Sunday. Archived from the original on April 6, 2017 – via YouTube.
- Hart, Gerry (March 18, 2002). "Points of Impact". CMJ New Music Report. Vol. 70, no. 754. ISSN 0890-0795.
- Levine, Sharon (March 1, 2003). "Victory Uses Internet, Samples, Retail Marketing To Promote TBS". Billboard. Vol. 115, no. 9. ISSN 0006-2510.
- Maffei, Greg (February 14, 2003). "Going for Adds" (PDF). Radio & Records. ISSN 0277-4860.
- Manley, Brendan (July 2011). "Great Romances of the 21st Century: Roots, Rock, Ruin, Redemption". Alternative Press. No. 276. ISSN 1065-1667.
- Morris, Chris (December 27, 2003). "Breakthroughs And Swan Songs". Billboard. Vol. 115, no. 52. ISSN 0006-2510. Archived from the original on February 16, 2021.
- Napier, Patrick, ed. (April 2019). "The 250 Greatest Albums Of Our Lifetime". Rock Sound. No. 250. London. ISSN 1465-0185.
- Orshoski, Wes, ed. (November 22, 2003). "Addin' Da Flavor". Billboard. Vol. 115, no. 47. ISSN 0006-2510.
- Reesman, Bryan (April 3, 2004). "Victory Scores With Indie Grit". Billboard. Vol. 116, no. 14. ISSN 0006-2510.
- Reesman, Bryan (April 3, 2004). "Victory's Brummel Sets Long-Term Goals". Billboard. Vol. 116, no. 14. ISSN 0006-2510.
- Taking Back Sunday (2005). Exclusive Interview With Original Members (Enhanced CD). Victory Records. VR286-2.
- Taking Back Sunday (March 28, 2019). Taking Back Sunday on Tell All Your Friends (Album by Album Series). Archived from the original on December 12, 2021 – via YouTube.
- Wood, Mikael (May 16, 2009). "Sunday Styles". Billboard. Vol. 121, no. 19. ISSN 0006-2510.
