= Bleeding (disambiguation) =

Bleeding usually means the leakage or loss of blood from the body.

Bleeding, bleed, or bleeder may also refer to:

- Bleed (printing), intentionally printing across the expected trim line or edge of the sheet
- Bleed, or spill (audio), when audio from one source is picked up by a microphone intended for a different source
- Bleed, the presence of surface water on concrete
- Bleed air, compressed air taken from gas turbine compressor stages
- Bleeder, baseball term for a weakly hit ground ball that goes for a base hit
- Bleeder, a gender term for someone who menstruates
- Bleeder resistor, which passively discharges a capacitor when it is disconnected or equipment is powered off
- Bleeding (computer graphics), a computer graphics term for when a graphic object passes through another in an unwanted manner
- Bleeding (roads), a type of pavement distress common in asphalt roads
- Bleeding, or capillary action, the ability of a substance (such as blood, ink, or water) to flow in narrow spaces without the assistance of, and in opposition to external forces like gravity
- Bleeding, purging air from a radiator, brake line, hydraulic clutch system, fuel line, etc. See Brake bleeding.
- Bleeding, the migration by dissolution of a component of a composite, e.g., pigments bleed into some plasticizers
- Bleeding order, a relation between rules in linguistics
- Bloodletting, a practice once believed to cure diseases

== Arts, entertainment, and media ==
=== Film ===
- Bleeder (film), a 1999 Danish crime film
- Bleeders (film), a 1997 Canadian horror film
- The Bleeder (in the UK and Ireland), Chuck (film), a 2016 American film
- The Bleeding (film), a 2009 action-horror film

=== Music ===
- Bleed (band), an alternative metal band from Texas
- Bleeders (band), a New Zealand band

==== Albums ====
- Bleed (album), a 1999 album by Angel Dust
- Bleed, 2011 album by Catalepsy
- Bleeds (Roots Manuva album), a 2015 album by Roots Manuva
- Bleeds (Wednesday album), a 2025 album by Wednesday
- Bleeders (album), 2008
- Bleeder (album), 2015
- Bleeding (album), a 1996 album by Psychotic Waltz
- The Bleeding (album), a 1994 album by Cannibal Corpse

==== Songs ====
- "Bleed" (A Boogie wit da Hoodie song), 2020
- "Bleed" (Collective Soul song), 1995
- "Bleed" (Hot Chelle Rae song), 2010
- "Bleed" (Soulfly song), 1998
- "Bleed" (The Kid Laroi song), 2023
- "Bleed" (Malcolm Todd song), 2025
- "Bleed", song by The Amity Affliction from the album House of Cards
- "Bleed", song by Catatonia from the album The Sublime Magic of Catatonia
- "Bleed", song by Cold from the album 13 Ways to Bleed on Stage
- "Bleed", song by Deadmau5 from the album While (1<2)
- "Bleed", song by Edge of Sanity from the album Until Eternity Ends
- "Bleed", song by Meshuggah from the album obZen
- "Bleed", song by Puddle of Mudd from the album The Punisher: The Album
- "Bleed", song by Sentenced from the album Down
- "Bleed", song by Vixen from the album Tangerine
- "Bleeding" (song), a 2005 song by Lovex
- "Bleeding", song by The Prom Kings from their self-titled album
- "Bleeding", song by Varials from the album In Darkness
- "The Bleeding" (song), a 2007 song by Five Finger Death Punch

=== Other arts, entertainment, and media ===
- Bleed (video game), an action-oriented platform video game
- "Bleed", the emotional transfer between a player and their character during a role-playing game coined by Emily Care Boss

== See also ==
- Bloody (disambiguation)
