= Suit of Lights =

American indie rock band

- Origin: New Jersey, United States
- Genres: Rock, Indie rock, Alternative rock
- Years active: 2004– present
- Labels: Visiting Hours
- Members: Joe Darone; Arun Venkatesh; James Kluz
- Past members: Trevor Dunn; Steve Pedulla; James Egan; Dan McGowan; Chris Connors

Suit of Lights is a rock band. They have been described as an "indie rock manifestation" led by Joe Darone, whose noteworthy contributors include Trevor Dunn from Mr. Bungle, Steve Pedulla from Thursday, and Jamie Egan from Catch 22 and Streetlight Manifesto.

== Current contributing members ==
- Joe Darone (Vocals, bass, keyboards and programming)
- Arun Venkatesh (Lead and rhythm guitar, programming)
- James Kluz (Drums and percussion)

== Past contributing members ==
- Trevor Dunn (electric and upright bass)
- Steve Pedulla (lead guitar)
- James Egan (trumpet, trombone, saxophone and flute)
- Dan McGowan (guitar)
- Chris Connors (guitar)
- John Underwood (guitar)
- Evan Silverman (electric and upright bass)
- Billy Carrión Jr (bass)
- Roy Van Tassel (drums)
- Dino Covelli (keyboards)
- Scott Chasolen (piano, organ, rhodes, wurlitzer, clavinet and moog)

== Official discography ==
- "Waking Up is Good / Goodbye Silk City" (7”, 2004)
- Suit of Lights (CD, 2005)
- Bacteria (CD, 2009)
- Shine On Forever (CD, 2012)
- Break Open the Head (LP/CD, 2016)
- Hide and Seek (LP/CD, 2020)
- The Empty Vault (Digital Single, 2022)

== Compilation appearances ==
- Paste 14
- Loud Merch Volume One
- Magnet New Music Sampler Volume 37
- Wonkavision Everlasting Sampler Vol. 5
- Pop Culture Press CD No. 22
- Relix March 2013 CD Sampler
- Prog P45: See Emily Play
- Prog P112: A Gentleman's Excuse Me
