= Understanding in a Car Crash =

Single by Thursday

from the album Full Collapse
- Released: April 2001
- Recorded: 2000 at Big Blue Meenie in Jersey City, New Jersey; mastered at Surgical Sound
- Genre: Post-hardcore; emo
- Label: Victory
- Songwriters: Tom Keeley, Tim Payne, Steve Pedulla, Geoff Rickly, Tucker Rule
- Producer: Sal Villanueva

Thursday singles chronology
"Understanding in a Car Crash" (2001)	"Cross Out the Eyes" (2002)

"Understanding in a Car Crash" is a song by American post-hardcore band Thursday. It was the band's debut single and the lead single from their second album, Full Collapse, in late 2001. "Understanding" was chosen for release as a single and shot by Victory Records during the band's tour with Saves the Day without Thursday's consent. The music video gained rotation on MTV2 and MMUSA upon its release in early 2002. The simple presentation features concert footage of the song's performance with shots cascading on top of one another.

"Understanding" has remained perhaps the band's most well known song and a concert staple. It is usually performed together with "The Other Side of the Crash/Over and Out (Of Control)," a song from the 2006 album, A City by the Light Divided, that tells the other side of the same story.

== Music and lyrics ==
"Understanding in a Car Crash" has a reference to Neil Young's "The Needle and the Damage Done."

== Reception ==
Kurt Morris of AllMusic chose "Understanding in a Car Crash" an AllMusic Pick in his review for Full Collapse. He described the song as "a warm, daydream piece that might give listeners a feeling that they are listening to a more modern, upbeat version of The Cure." It was cited as a favorite among six other songs in a 2004 article by the Las Vegas Mercury entitled "Road scholar: Crash course - The Doom-and-Gloom Alternatives to The Beach Boys' 'Little Deuce Coupe'." In it, writer Newt Briggs explains, "Leave it to the emo kids to turn a split second of underwear-soiling terror into a moment for deep thought and introspection."

Variety ranked it as one of the best emo songs of all time in 2022.

== Personnel ==
Thursday

- Geoff Rickly – vocals
- Tom Keeley – lead guitar, vocals
- Steve Pedulla – rhythm guitar, vocals
- Tim Payne – bass guitar
- Tucker Rule – drums

Additional musicians and personnel

- Sal Villanueva – production
- Erin Farley – engineering, additional guitar
