= Permanent Revolution =

Permanent Revolution or similar may refer to:

- Permanent revolution, a term within Marxist theory, coined about 1850
- The Permanent Revolution, a 1930 book by Leon Trotsky
- Permanent Revolution (group), a Trotskyist group in the UK 2006–2013
- Permanent Revolution (album), a 2006 album by Catch 22
