= Folly (band) =

Hardcore band from Sussex, NJ

- Origin: Sussex, New Jersey
- Genres: Hardcore punk, metalcore, ska punk, melodic hardcore
- Years active: 1997–2008, 2011, 2022–present
- Labels: Triple Crown; New World; Bad Time
- Members: Arben Colaku - Bass; Geoff Towle - Guitar; Anthony Wille - Drums; Agim Colaku - Guitar; Jon Tummillo - Vocals
- Past members: Al Phillips “official” - Trumpet

Folly is from Sussex, New Jersey. Their music is a mix of hardcore, metal, punk and ska. The band's final lineup included Arben Colaku on bass, Geoff Towle on guitar, Anthony Wille on drums, Agim Colaku on guitar, and Jon Tummillo on vocals, and past members include Al Phillips on trumpet. They released two albums and two extended plays before disbanding.

== History ==
=== Early years ===
Folly was formed in around 1997 at High Point Regional High School. Agim Colaku and Geoff Towle were the only two original members who remained in the band throughout. Former members include Josh Witt (drums), Billy Pouch (bass), Kurt Rohel (drums), Larry Braun (vocals), Al Phillips (trumpet) and Tony Perdisatt (vocals).

Jon Tummillo became the vocalist in 1998, and Arben Colaku, Agim's brother, joined at bass a year later. Folly's first release was recorded at Nada Studio in Orange County, NY. The band played shows in the New Jersey and tri-state area, before meeting Jesse and Alex Burton, managers of small New Jersey indie label New World Records.

Before they recorded their first EP, "For My Friends" at the beginning of summer 2001, for New World Records, they embarked on a tour of the East Coast of the United States with Face First. After Anthony Wille joined as the band's drummer, they began to play outside of their regional area across the rest of the country. In early summer of 2002, Folly met producer Sal Villanueva of Big Blue Meenie, where they had been the year before to mix their EP, to record a further three-track demo, featuring backing vocals from members of Shai Hulud. After a further two tours, the band played a show at the Stevens Institute of Technology in Hoboken, New Jersey, with Converge, The Survivors, and A Life Once Lost, where they were approached by Fred Feldman, owner of Triple Crown Records.

=== Triple Crown Records ===
Their debut album Insanity Later was recorded in late 2003 at Big Blue Meenie, production by Sal Villanueva, and released on April 6, 2004. The album features guest vocals from Joey Southside of The Banner, Eric Gunderson of Killed By Memories, and Erin Farley, and includes a montage music video for the unreleased song "Broken", edited by Robbie Tassaro.

The band's second album, Resist Convenience, was released on March 10, 2006, again produced by Sal Villanueva at Big Blue Meenie. The album features guest vocals from Tyler Guida of My Bitter End, Logan Laflotte of Paulson, and Eric Gunderson.

Folly has since toured with bands including Senses Fail, Moneen, The Beautiful Mistake, Paulson, Anterrabae, The Banner, Underminded, Look What I Did, Drop Dead, Gorgeous, The Human Abstract, The Forecast, The Static Age, and played festivals including Hellfest in New Jersey in 2004 and Saints and sinners festival in New Jersey, 2006.

Their final release was a self-released seven-song digital EP entitled These are the Names of the Places We Broke Down, with the titles of the songs taken from towns the band had broken down while touring.

=== Break-up and later activity ===
Folly announced their split with a statement on their Myspace page. They played three farewell shows in April 2008, on April 11 at the Knights of Columbus in Wallingford, Connecticut, April 12 at the School Of Rock in South Hackensack, New Jersey, and April 13 at The Mainstage in Pompton Lakes.

Members of the band have gone on to play in a variety of other bands.

In April 2011, Folly performed a series of shows at small venues over the span of a few days around New Jersey.

2019 saw the 15-year anniversary of FOLLY’s debut album. The band celebrated this milestone with a vinyl re-issue of Insanity Later, adding re-imagined artwork and a new layout, put out by Triple Crown Records.

The band re-emerged once more in 2022 when RTF Records re-issued the band’s 2002 demo on a limited-run cassette tape in July.

On September 30, 2022, FOLLY debuted their first new recorded music in 14 years with “Walter White Whale” on Wavebreaker 3, a split 7-inch with the band The Best of The Worst on Bad Time Records. The band additionally announced an appearance at the 2022 edition of Gainesville's The Fest with some Northeast shows including at Amityville Music Hall in Amityville, NY, Crossroads in Garwood, NJ and the Space Ballroom in Hamden, CT with support coming from The Best of the Worst, Keep Flying, Kill Lincoln, Catbite, Mercy Union, BORE, Godseyes, The Upfux, Cutdown and Abraskadabra.

== Members ==
- Al Phillips "official" - trumpet
- Arben Colaku - bass
- Geoff Towle - guitar
- Anthony Wille - drums
- Agim Colaku - guitar
- Jon Tummillo - vocals

== Discography ==
- '98 Demo (1998)
- '99 Demo (1999)
- For My Friends EP (2001, New World Records)
- '02 Demo (2002)
- Insanity Later (2004, Triple Crown Records)
- Resist Convenience (2006, Triple Crown Records) (2024 re-issue, Bad Time Records)
- These Are The Names of Places We Broke Down In: EP (2008, Digital Self-Release)
- Wavebreaker 3- Split with The Best of the Worst EP (2022, Bad Time Records)
