= Visiting Hours =

Visiting Hours may refer to:

- Visiting Hours (film), a 1982 Canadian horror film starring Michael Ironside
- "Visiting Hours" (song), by Ed Sheeran, 2021
- "Visiting Hours" (Slow Horses), a 2022 television episode
- "Visiting Hours", a song by Cardiac Arrest (later Cardiacs) from The Obvious Identity, 1980
- "Visiting Hours", a song by Kero Kero Bonito from Time 'n' Place, 2018
- "Visiting Hours", an independent record label established by Joe Darone in 2005

== See also ==
- "Visiting Ours", an episode of the first season of Arrested Development
