= Big Blue Meenie Recording Studio =

Former production house in Jersey City

Coordinates: 40.755222°N 74.043517°W

Big Blue Meenie
- Company type: Production House
- Genre: Recording Studio
- Predecessor: Quantum Sound
- Founded: Hackensack, New Jersey (1991)
- Founder: Tom Aldi; Julie Gilles; Tim Gilles; Joe Mahoney
- Defunct: January 11th 2015
- Headquarters: Jersey City, New Jersey, U.S.
- Key people: Sal Villanueva, Producer; Kevin Neaton, Eng’g/Prod. Jeff Canas, Engineer; Matt Messenger, Engineer; Alex Eddings,
- Owner: Tim Gilles
- Number of employees: ~16
- Website: http://www.bigbluemeenie.com/

Big Blue Meenie was a production house in Jersey City, New Jersey.

== History ==
The facility is located on 512 Paterson Plank Road, near Washington Park, and was built in the late 19th century. Prior to 1981, it was used by a chandelier factory, until it stopped operation in the late 20th century.

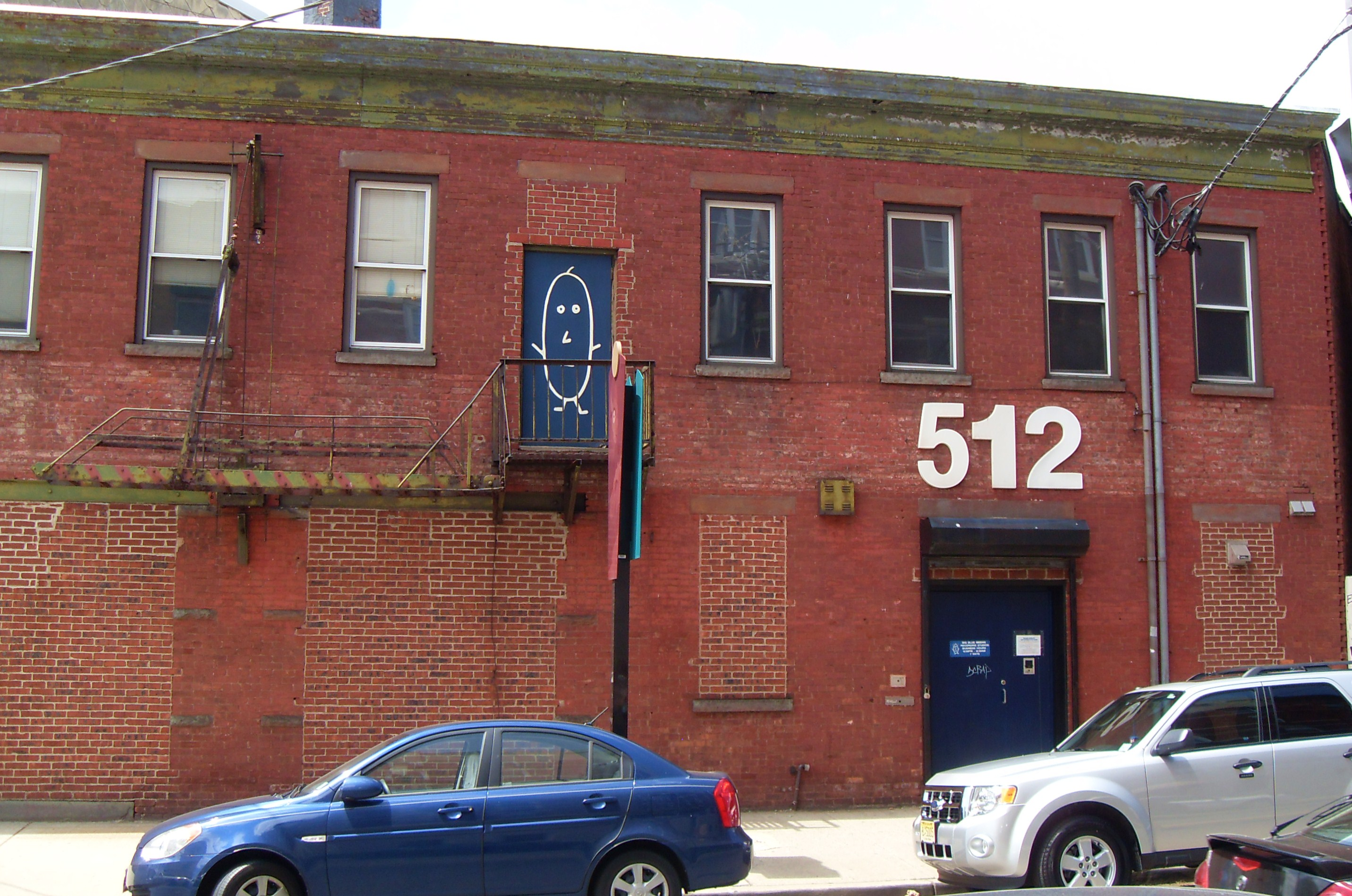
The front entrance to Big Blue Meenie.

=== Quantum Sound ===
In 1981 Reggie Lucas, the producer of Madonna's self-titled first album, purchased the building and opened a recording studio, Quantum Sound Studios. By 1986 it was reported to feature the first SSL mix room, a 48 input SSL 4000 console with Total Recall, in Northern New Jersey as well as an extensive collection of MIDI synthesizers and gear and a Synclavier digital audio system. Grammy Award-winning music studio engineer and producer Andy Wallace mixed tracks for Helmet and Rage Against the Machine, as well as many others at Quantum in the late 1980s and early 1990s. Other musicians and producers used Lucas' studio for hire approach for recording, like INXS and Queen Latifah. By 1994 Lucas left the studio, and although he had spent a lot of time and effort fitting the original factory with the control rooms and recording spaces, by the time it was purchased by its successor in 1998, the old Quantum studios were in a state of extreme dilapidation.

=== Big Blue Meenie ===
In 1991, Tim Gilles (nicknamed "Rumblefish") and his then wife, Julie, as well as Joe Mahoney and Tom Aldi started Big Blue Meenie Studios in the basement of his house, in Hackensack, New Jersey, primarily using an 8-track recorder. After several years of growing success and a positive reputation among musicians in the area, the group began closing down their original locations and made arrangements to buy the former Quantum Sound Studios in 1998; on February 2, 1999, the building was officially purchased. On June 18, 1999, the facility officially opened with the then first of its kind mixer, an Amek 9098i analog console built by console engineer Rupert Neve. The Amek at Big Blue Meenie is one of about twenty in the world. Under the producer Sal Villanueva and the rest of the engineers, several post-hardcore bands began their career recording at the studio; Thursday recorded their debut album Waiting in 1999, and Taking Back Sunday recorded Tell All Your Friends in 2001, which on its 2005 reissue featured a bonus song called "The Ballad of Sal Villanueva". Thursday has continually gone back to Villanueva, including his recording of the breakout album Full Collapse in 2001.

Throughout its existence, 24 Gold and 10 Platinum records have been mixed or recorded at the 512 Paterson Plank facility; and some of the Gold and Platinum records are displayed in the reception area upon entering the studio.

== Equipment and Features ==
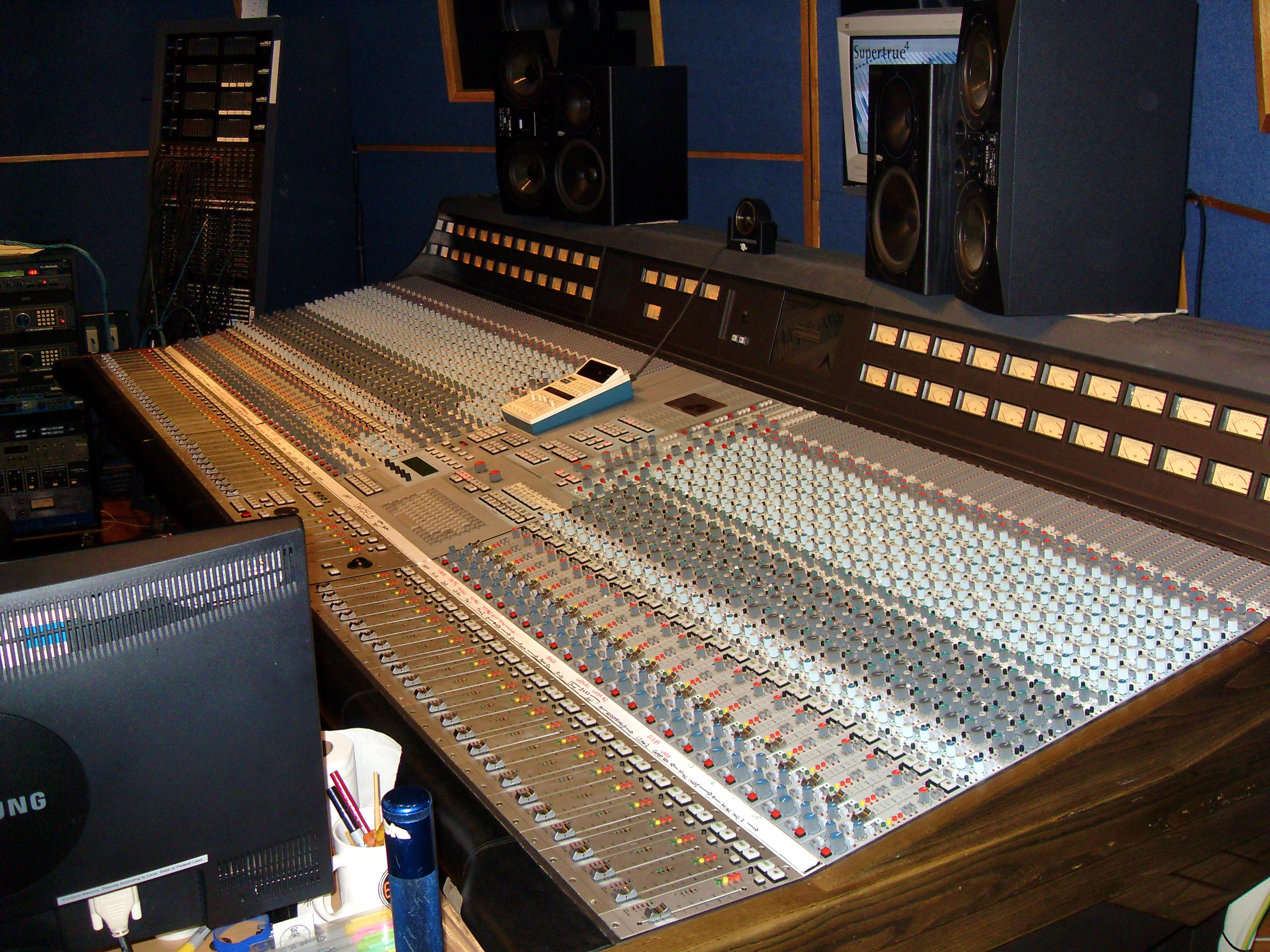
The Amek 9098i console in control room, Studio A.

The 2 floor building has a total area between 8,500-square-foot (790 m^{2}) and 9,000-square-foot (840 m^{2}) and has 3 main performing studios, named Studios A, B, C and a fourth room D, as well as "The Batcave", a mixing room solely for beat-making and editing. Overall, Big Blue Meenie contains 4 control rooms, 2 live performance spaces, and features 4 ISO rooms and 3 editing/support DAW suites. On the second floor, Big Blue Meenie had its own mastering outfit, named Surgical Sound, but the second floor is now used by studio D. The studio has used analog and two-inch tapes to record the initial take, and then upload them into a digital environment for further editing. In an interview regarding the reasoning behind this approach, Gilles stated:

We don't even mention the 'd' word around here. I have digital gear around here, but everything gets done on analog and 2-inch. We're old-school analog guys. And a huge amount of staying in the business is keeping the studio operational, and we suffer zero downtime.

He also states that he is most comfortable using the two-inch tape, as he is familiar with what this process does to the recordings. Processing the sound in this manner according to Gilles, gives the music the studio mixes and masters a unique thumbprint, and an authentic sound. But depending on the client request or specification, the team does use digital recordings, and are not limited to either process singularly. Big Blue Meenie has worked exclusively with Apple and uses their software Logic Pro for mixing after analog recording. Other high end equipment and devices used in the studio include an Amek Mozart RN, ADAM S3A monitors, Yamaha NSTO's, and SL1200 turntables, as well as an extensive mic locker with limited and vintage microphones, and "boutique" outboard equipment.

Since the facilities inception in the 1980s, all genres of music have been worked on; although under Quantum, more pop and R&B artists were mixed as opposed to many of the bands that record at Big Blue Meenie today, which are mainly more rock or metal oriented groups. With the equipment and editing software and hardware it has, the recording studio offers studio time for any genre of music, from Rock to Hip Hop and voiceovers. Over the years, the facility on Paterson Plank road has been renovated several times, and the business has grown from about $2000 of gear used by Gilles in his basement to record and mix his own band, to an estimated $2 million studio. It is considered one of the oldest and largest "Open for Hire" studios on the East Coast.

== Notable recordings ==
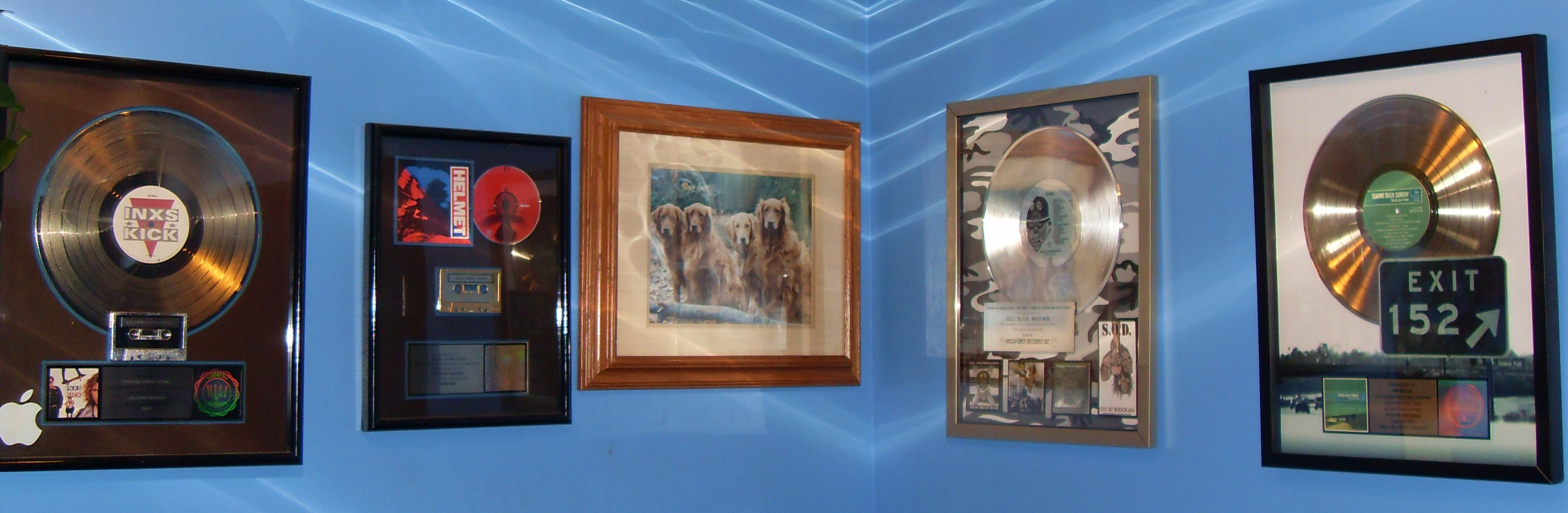
Records on display at reception desk (from left to right) INXS, Helmet, S.O.D., Taking Back Sunday

Artist	Album(s)	Personnel
Taking Back Sunday	Tell All Your Friends	Sal Villanueva
Thursday	Kill the House Lights War All the Time; Five Stories Falling; Full Collapse; Waiting	Sal Villanueva
Calico System	They Live	
Family Jewels	Chuck and Louise	
Catch 22	Washed Up and Through the Ringer	Tim Gilles
Agnostic Front	Riot, Riot, Upstart; Dead Yuppies	Tim Gilles; Tim Gilles, Erin Farley
S.O.D.	Bigger than the Devil Speak English or Die: Platinum Edition and 20th Anniversary Edition; Seasoning the Obese	Tim Gilles, Richard Wielgosz, Vincent Wojno Tim Gilles Tim Gilles
INXS	Kick	
Queen Latifah	Come Into My House	
Vision of Disorder	For the Bleeders	Tim Gilles
Breaking Pangaea	Phoenix	Tim Gilles; Erin Farley
Ripping Corpse	Dreaming with the Dead (Kraze/Maze, 1991)	Erik Rutan Shaune Kelly, Scott Ruth, Brandon Thomas, Dave Bizzigotti
James Patrick McGrath	Self-titled album (James Patrick McGrath Music)	Sal Villanueva, Tim Gilles, Tucker Rule
Savant	The Dawning (Black Pumpkin, 1997); Alone (OXSO Entertainment, 2002)	

=== Mixing/Editing ===
- Pet Shop Boys
- Jodeci
- Rage Against the Machine
- The Toadies
- Jeff Buckley
- Sepultura
- Ripping Corpse
- Mucky Pup

== Sources ==
- Dupler, Steven (October 18, 1986). "A Quantum Leap". Billboard magazine. 98 (42). Nielsen Business Media, Inc: 122. ISSN 0006-2510.
- Dupler, Steven (December 20, 1986). "Sound Investment". Billboard magazine. 98 (51). Nielsen Business Media, Inc: 80. ISSN 0006-2510.
- Hagstrom Map (2008). Hudson County New Jersey Street Map. Hagstrom Map Company, Inc. ISBN 978-0-88097-763-0.
- Sharpe-Young, Garry (2005). New Wave of American Heavy Metal. Zonda Books Limited. p. 376. ISBN 0-9582684-0-1.
- Verna, Paul (June 12, 1999). "Studio Monitor". Billboard magazine. 111 (24). Nielsen Business Media, Inc: 100. ISSN 0006-2510.
- Verna, Paul (September 25, 1999). "Big, Bad and Blue". Billboard magazine. 111 (39). Nielsen Business Media, Inc: 108. ISSN 0006-2510.
- Whaley, Julie (1988). Songwriter's market: where & how to market your songs. Writer's Digest Books. p. 512. ISBN 0-89879-333-5.
