= Waiting (Thursday album) =

Studio album by Thursday
- Released: November 8, 1999
- Recorded: Spring 1999
- Studio: Big Blue Meenie, Jersey City, New Jersey; Mother West Studios
- Genre: Post-hardcore; alternative rock; indie rock
- Length: 33:47
- Label: Eyeball
- Producer: Sal Villanueva

Thursday chronology
1999 Summer Tour EP (1999)	Waiting (1999)	Full Collapse (2001)

Waiting is the debut studio album by American rock band Thursday. The album was produced by Sal Villanueva and released on Eyeball Records in 1999. The photography throughout the album's artwork, with the exception of live shots, was done by Tom Keeley's uncle, Dennis Keeley.

This was the band's only album recorded with rhythm guitarist Bill Henderson, who would be replaced by Steve Pedulla in 2000.

== Background ==
With the exception of "Introduction" and "Where the Circle Ends", Waiting was recorded at the Big Blue Meenie studio in Jersey City, New Jersey in Spring 1999. Sal Villanueva acted as producer for the sessions. Jason Kantor engineered the recordings, while Tim Gilles mastered them at Surgical Sound. "Introduction" and "Where the Circle Ends" were recorded by Charles Newman at Mother West Studios. The two tracks were mastered by Alan Douches at West West Side Music. According to the liner notes, a few additional musicians contributed to the recordings, listed as follows: Frank (guitar), Britta (violin), Mike (guitar input) and Kelly (live violinist).

== Songs ==
The song "Porcelain" is a tribute and call to action regarding the death of a friend and gun control. Kevin, best friend to Geoff Rickly, had committed suicide soon after moving to San Francisco while suffering from schizophrenia. At the time of his suicide, there wasn't a toll-free suicide hotline available in San Francisco that Kevin was aware of and he was unable to seek counseling at the time of his death. The song "Ian Curtis" was named after the late lead singer of the UK group Joy Division. Another victim of suicide, Curtis hanged himself in his Macclesfield home in 1980. The song contains many Joy Division song references, most notably the lyric "Love has torn us apart", which they printed on shirts during the tour for the album.

The song "Dying in New Brunswick" was written by Geoff Rickly about his girlfriend who moved to New Brunswick and was raped while she was there. The lyrics are about how he hated the city for what happened and how he felt like he was dying whenever he was there.

== Release ==
In July 1999, while on tour, the group released 1999 Summer Tour EP, an EP that featured demos and unmastered songs that would feature on Waiting. Waiting was released through Eyeball Records in November 1999; drummer Tucker Rule said the band heard through mutual friends that Revelation Records wanted to sign them, but the label never approached them. The cover was taken by Dennis Keeley.

=== 2015 reissue ===
To commemorate the 15th anniversary of Thursday's debut album Waiting, Geoff Rickly's label Collect Records released a remastered version of the album on March 24, 2015. The updated version features updated artwork and was released in a package containing the album on CD and 180 gram 12" LP with a bonus 7" containing demos of "This Side of Brightness" and "Dying in New Brunswick," in addition to the track "Mass as Shadows," which previously appeared on Thursday's 1999 tour EP. To promote the reissue, Collect Records released a lyric video for the track "Where the Circle Ends".

== Critical reception ==
Professional ratings
Review scores
Source	Rating
AllMusic	3.5/5 stars
Pitchfork	6.5/10.0
Punknews.org	5/5 stars
Sputnikmusic	2.0/5

Waiting has received mixed reviews from music critics. Amongst the positive reviews was Tom Forget from AllMusic, who wrote that "[Thursday] hadn't quite mastered the blend at this point in their careers, but they did get off to a great start." Comparing that album the rest of the band's oeuvre, Ian Cohen at Pitchfork stated that "Waiting simply stands as Thursday’s most promising and earnest album."

Other writers have been more critical of the album. In a summary of the review for Sputnikmusic, 'DaveyBoy' claimed that "Songwriting & musical potential is evident, but this debut is brought down by raw production and a short running time that contains too much filler, repetition & padding out." In an initial review for Punk News, 'layawayplan' felt that "Some of the melodies seem ill-conceived, leaving me scratching my head, and a bit depressed. Lead singer Geoff doesn't seem to have fully developed the vocal talent he displays on Full Collapse. The amazing screamed backup vocals (the first thing about Thursday to catch my attention) are there, but again, aren't as good as they could be." However, in a review for the 2015 expanded edition from the same website, that album received a much warmer reception with writer 'RENALDO69' stating that "Waiting will always be the starting point for a movement and revolution in my life. It's quite a ride to take in the more vulnerable and exposed tracks in the expanded edition, and one heck of a nostalgic trip!"

== Track listing ==
1. "Porcelain" – 4:40
2. "This Side of Brightness" – 3:35
3. "Ian Curtis" – 3:47
4. "Introduction" – 1:58
5. "Streaks in the Sky" – 4:30
6. "In Transmission" – 3:41
7. "Dying in New Brunswick" – 4:06
8. "The Dotted Line" – 4:19
9. "Where the Circle Ends" – 3:11

2015 reissue 7" vinyl/CD bonus tracks

1. "This Side of Brightness" (demo) – 3:33
2. "Dying in New Brunswick" (demo) – 3:56
3. "Mass as Shadows" – 6:33

== Personnel ==
Personnel per booklet.

Thursday

- Tom Keeley – lead guitar
- Tucker Rule – drums
- Bill Henderson – rhythm guitar
- Geoff Rickly – vocals
- Tim Payne – bass

Additional musicians

- Frank – guitar
- Britta – violin
- Mike – guitar input
- Kelly – live violinist

Production

- Sal Villanueva – producer
- Jason Kantor – engineer
- Tim Gilles – mastering
- Charles Newman – recording (tracks 4 and 9)
- Alan Douches – mastering (tracks 4 and 9)
- Dennis Keeley – cover photo, non–live photos
- Keri Levin – live photos
- Laura Dapito – layout, design
- Vincent Li – layout, coordination
