= Five Stories Falling =

EP by Thursday
- Released: October 22, 2002
- Recorded: 2002
- Genre: Emo, post-hardcore
- Length: 23:46
- Label: Victory
- Producer: Sal Villanueva

Thursday chronology
Full Collapse (2001)	Five Stories Falling (2002)	War All the Time (2003)

Professional ratings
Review scores
Source	Rating
AllMusic	3/5 stars
Exclaim!	Unfavorable
IGN	9/10
Rolling Stone	2/5 stars

Five Stories Falling is a five-song EP released by Thursday in 2002. The first four tracks are live versions of songs from Full Collapse, recorded while the band performed on the Vans Warped Tour. The fifth track, a new song named "Jet Black New Year", quickly became popular amongst fans; the song featured Gerard Way of My Chemical Romance performing screamed background vocals. The EP also featured stories by each of the band members, including touring (and now permanent) keyboardist Andrew Everding.

On their UK Tour in 2006, when introducing the song "Jet Black New Year", lead singer Geoff Rickly publicly urged the crowd present not to purchase this E.P. but to download "Jet Black New Year" instead.

It reached #197 on the Billboard 200.

== Tracks ==
All lyrics are written by Geoff Rickly; all music is composed by Thursday.

No.	Title	Length
1.	"Autobiography of a Nation" (live)	4:25
2.	"Understanding in a Car Crash" (live)	5:26
3.	"Standing on the Edge of Summer" (live)	4:18
4.	"Paris in Flames" (live)	4:50
5.	"Jet Black New Year"	4:49

== Personnel ==
- Geoff Rickly - vocals
- Tucker Rule - drums, backing vocals
- Tom Keeley - lead guitar, backing vocals
- Tim Payne - bass, backing vocals
- Steve Pedulla - rhythm guitar, backing vocals
- Gerard Way - backing vocals on "Jet Black New Year"
- Sal Villanueva - production, engineering
- Rumblefish - mixing

== Charts ==
Chart performance for Five Stories Falling
Chart (2002)	Peak position
US Billboard 200	197
US Heatseekers Albums (Billboard)	6
US Independent Albums (Billboard)	10
