= As Sweet as Sin =

Studio album by Bleeders
- Released: 2006
- Recorded: 2005
- Genre: Hardcore punk, emo
- Length: 43:47
- Label: Elevenfiftyseven Records/Universal Music
- Producer: Sal Villanueva

Bleeders chronology
The Bleeders (2005)	As Sweet as Sin (2006)	Bleeders (2007)

As Sweet as Sin is the debut album by New Zealand band, the Bleeders released in 2006. It was recorded in 2005 in New Jersey. Upon release, the album debuted at number two on the Official New Zealand Music Chart and was eventually certified Gold.

The track "Wild at Heart" is featured in a scene in the New Zealand film, Sione's Wedding, but is not featured on the film's soundtrack.

== Track listing ==
1. "The Kill" – 3:25
2. "Secrets" – 3:57
3. "Holding On" – 2:55
4. "Out of Time" – 3:49
5. "Wild at Heart" – 2:55
6. "Nightmares" – 3:44
7. "Night Sky" – 3:50
8. "S.O.S." featuring Danny Diablo – 1:13
9. "Silhouettes" – 3:16
10. "It's Black II" – 2:17
11. "Bridges Burning" – 3:23
12. "Femme Fatale" featuring Roxy – 2:36
13. "Eating Up Your Mind" – 2:22
14. "A Bleeding Heart" – 3:53

== Personnel ==
- Angelo Munro – vocals
- Hadleigh Donald – guitars, backing vocals
- Ian King – guitars, backing vocals
- Gareth Stack – bass guitar, backing vocals
- Matt Clark – drums, vocals
- Danny Diablo – additional vocals on "S.O.S."

== Chart performance ==
=== Weekly charts ===
Chart (2006)	Peak position
New Zealand Albums (RMNZ)	2

== Certifications ==
Region	Certification	Certified units/sales
New Zealand (RMNZ)	Gold	5,000^{*}
^{*} Sales figures based on certification alone.
