= The Bleeders (album) =

2005 studio album by the Bleeders

Studio album by The Bleeders
- Released: 2005
- Recorded: 2003
- Genre: Hardcore punk
- Label: Casadeldisco Records

The Bleeders chronology
A Bleeding Heart (2003)	The Bleeders (2005)	As Sweet as Sin (2006)

The Bleeders was a self-titled re-release/repackaging of the Bleeders 2003 EP A Bleeding Heart, and the later double A-side single release of "All that Glitters"/"So Lonely" by New Zealand band the Bleeders, released in 2005. It was released almost exclusively in Australia where the other releases were not available.

== Track listing ==
1. "All That Glitters"
2. "So Lonely"
3. "Family"
4. "Cast in the Shadows"
5. "Sell Out"
6. "It's Black"
7. "Channelling"
8. "A Bleeding Heart"
