= Dinosaur Sounds =

Studio album by Catch 22
- Released: November 4, 2003
- Studio: Trax East, South River, NJ
- Genre: Third wave ska; alternative rock
- Length: 33:06
- Label: Victory
- Producer: Catch 22

Catch 22 chronology
Washed Up and Through the Ringer (2001)	Dinosaur Sounds (2003)	Live! (2004)

Catch 22 studio chronology
Alone in a Crowd (2000)	Dinosaur Sounds (2003)	Permanent Revolution (2006)

Professional ratings
Review scores
Source	Rating
AllMusic	3/5 stars

Dinosaur Sounds is the third album by American ska-punk band Catch 22, released on November 4, 2003, under Victory Records. This is the first Catch 22 album with Ryan Eldred on lead vocals.

== Release ==
Dinosaur Sounds was released in November 2003. In February 2004, the band toured across the US as part of the Ska Is Dead tour. In April and May 2004, the band went on a sequel tour, dubbed Ska Is Dead and You're Next Tour, with Big D and the Kids Table, Mustard Plug, and The Planet Smashers. In June and July, the band supported Reel Big Fish on their North American headlining tour. In August 2004, they went on a week-long tour with Punchline and Bayside. In October 2004, they supported Big D and the Kids Table on the US West Coast Ska Is Dead tour.

The album received mixed reviews, thanks in part to the band's recent loss of their main vocalist Jeff Davidson. Many critics also disliked the band's departure from their typical ska genre.

== Track listing ==
All tracks are written by Catch 22 unless otherwise noted.

No.	Title	Length
1.	"Rocky"	3:23
2.	"Beguile the Time"	2:47
3.	"Wine Stained Lips"	2:46
4.	"Motown Cinderella"	2:32
5.	"Chin Up"	3:20
6.	"Dreams of Venus"	3:07
7.	"Dripping Faucet"	3:11
8.	"Good Times" (Catch 22, Pat Kays, and Ian McKenzie)	3:06
9.	"Interlude"	0:41
10.	"So Cold"	2:57
11.	"Regression" (Catch 22, Pat Kays, and Ian McKenzie)	1:53
12.	"Chasing the Moon"	1:33
13.	"Lamont's Lament"	1:50
Total length:		33:06

- It is significant that the last five tracks are mislabeled when played on a computer: "Interlude" is labeled as "So Cold"; "Regression" as "Chasing the Moon"; "Chasing the Moon" as "Lamont's Lament"; "Lamont's Lament" as "Untitled Track". This is because "Interlude" was intentionally unlabeled on the jacket as a Hidden Track and incorrectly labelled during mastering.

== Personnel ==
- Pat Kays – bass guitar
- Ian McKenzie – trombone, vocals
- Ryan Eldred – saxophone, lead vocals
- Chris Greer – drum kit
- Kevin Gunther – trumpet, vocals
- Pat Calpin – guitar

=== Additional personnel ===
- Steve Evetts – producer, mixing
- Jesse Cannon – editing
- Erik Kvortek – assistant engineer
- Alan Douches – mastering
- Zak Kaplan – artwork, photography, construction
