= Alone in a Crowd (Catch 22 album) =

Studio album by Catch 22
- Released: October 10, 2000
- Recorded: June 2000
- Studio: Trax East (New Jersey), Trod Nossel Studios (Connecticut)
- Genre: Ska punk
- Length: 36:58
- Label: Victory
- Producer: Catch 22, Eric Rachel, James Egan

Catch 22 chronology
Washed Up! (1999)	Alone in a Crowd (2000)	Washed Up and Through the Ringer (2001)

Catch 22 studio chronology
Keasbey Nights (1998)	Alone in a Crowd (2000)	Dinosaur Sounds (2003)

Professional ratings
Review scores
Source	Rating
Allmusic	2.5/5 stars

Alone in a Crowd is the second album by Catch 22, and the first and only studio album featuring the band's second lineup (featuring Jeff Davidson as lead vocalist, replacing Tomas Kalnoky). It was recorded in June 2000, and released on October 10, 2000.

== Composition ==
The album features a song trilogy, "What Goes Around Comes Around," "Bloomfield Avenue," and "Neverending Story," which follows two young lovers who commit multiple acts of homicide on a cross-country spree before finally succumbing to their own personal demons. Themes on the album include a longing for childhood and home, and a general feeling of alienation from the rest of the world.

The end of the album features seven blank tracks, each 22 seconds long, followed by a bonus track that starts after 22 seconds of silence, bringing the album to a total of 22 tracks.

== Release ==
To promote the album, the band made a music video for "Point the Blame", the album's first single. However, due to financial problems, the video was never completed. The band closed the year touring the US with Reel Big Fish. In March 2001, the band toured across Canada with AFI. In May and June 2001, the band toured Europe as part of the Deconstruction Tour.

On January 30, 2016, Jeff Davidson joined the band to perform the album in full at Starland Ballroom in Sayreville, NJ. Davidson again joined the band on September 13, 2025, to perform the album in full celebrating its 25th anniversary at the Supernova International Ska Festival in Fort Monroe, Hampton, VA. Davidson once again performed the album in full on June 28, 2026, at Crafthouse Stage in Pittsburgh, PA.

== Track listing ==
All tracks are written by Jeff Davidson and Ryan Eldred unless otherwise noted.

No.	Title	Length
1.	"Intro"	0:18
2.	"Point the Blame"	2:17
3.	"Sounds Good But I Don't Know"	1:56
4.	"It Takes Some Time"	3:05
5.	"What Goes Around Comes Around"	2:39
6.	"Arm to Arm"	2:07
7.	"Guilty Pleasures"	2:22
8.	"Bloomfield Ave."	3:09
9.	"Hard to Impress" (Kevin Gunther)	2:05
10.	"San Francisco Payphone"	2:49
11.	"Wreck of the Sloop John B." (Traditional)	2:29
12.	"Neverending Story"	2:35
13.	"Thinking About Things"	1:58
14.	"Alone in a Crowd"	2:27
15.	"Blank Track"	0:55
16.	"Blank Track"	0:22
17.	"Blank Track"	0:22
18.	"Blank Track"	0:22
19.	"Blank Track"	0:22
20.	"Blank Track"	0:22
21.	"Blank Track"	0:22
22.	"Bonus Track"	1:32

- If you take the seconds of the CD length and subtract the minutes from it, the difference is 22, adding to the other, almost subliminal, 22s found throughout the album.

== Personnel ==
=== Catch 22 ===
- Jeff Davidson - lead vocals
- Pat Kays - bass guitar
- Ryan Eldred - saxophone, backing vocals
- Kevin Gunther - trumpet, backing vocals
- Mike Soprano - trombone, backing vocals
- Chris Greer - drum kit
- Pat Calpin - guitar

=== Additional personnel ===
- Jamey Jasta - vocals (track 9)
- Tony Brummel - gang vocals
- Kevin Gunther Sr. - guitar solo (track 11)
- Vinnie Nobile - additional trombone (tracks 3 - 5, 8)
- Sam "Samuri" Lee - violin (tracks 4 and 8)
- Vanessa Eldred - violin (tracks 4 and 8)
- Jenn Smull - cello (tracks 4 and 8)
- Jon Crane - double bass (tracks 4 and 8)
- "The 22 Will Drop You" crew - gang vocals
- Alan Douches - mastering
- Erin Farley - assistant engineer
- Patrick Larson - art direction, layout
- Jamie Egan - additional producer, arrangement (strings)
