= Sal Villanueva =

American record producer

Salvatore Villanueva
- Origin: New York
- Genres: Emo; post-hardcore; emo pop; pop-punk; alternative rock
- Occupations: Record producer, musician
- Instruments: Vocals; bass; guitar
- Member of: Joe Coffee
- Formerly of: Demonspeed; Murphy's Law

Salvatore Villanueva is an American record producer. Villaneuva's first entrance into the New York hardcore scene came when playing in bands including Demonspeed and Murphy's Law. He's currently the bassist for Joe Coffee, the band of Sheer Terror vocalist Paul Bearer.

Villanueva started producing during the boot camp recording sessions of the New York's Hardest compilation series done at the Big Blue Meenie Recording Studios. In the fall of 1999, Thursday's lead vocalist, Geoff Rickly, approached Villanueva to produce the band's Eyeball debut Waiting. Since then he has produced almost all of the band's recordings, including War All the Time for Island/Def Jam.

Following the success of Thursday's Full Collapse, Victory Records approached Villanueva to work with and develop Long Island emo band, Taking Back Sunday. The band's debut album, Tell All Your Friends, sold over 900,000 copies and became Victory's fastest and biggest selling record to date. Taking Back Sunday's Notes from the Past also contains a song called "The Ballad of Sal Villanueva".

== Discography ==
- 36 Crazyfists - Rest Inside the Flames, Roadrunner (Producer/Engineer)
- My American Heart - The Meaning in Makeup, Warcon (Producer/Engineer)
- Taking Back Sunday - Tell All Your Friends, Victory Records (Producer/Engineer)
- Thursday:

Kill the House Lights, Victory Records (Producer/Engineer)
War All the Time, Island/Def Jam (Producer/Engineer)
Five Stories Falling, Victory Records (Producer/Engineer)
Full Collapse, Victory Records (Producer/Engineer)
Waiting, Eyeball Records (Producer/Engineer)

- The Bleeders - As Sweet as Sin, Universal (Producer/Engineer)
- Elemno-P - Trouble in Paradise, Universal (Producer/Engineer)
- The Holiday Plan - The Holiday Plan, Universal/Island UK (Producer)
- Christiansen - Stylish Nihilists, Revelation Records (Producer/Engineer)
- Folly:

Resist Convenience, Triple Crown Records (Producer/Engineer)
Insanity Later, Triple Crown Records

- Skarhead - Kings at Crime, Victory Records (Producer/Engineer)
- Splitvalves - Movin' On, Resurrection A.D. (Producer)
- Maximum Penalty - Independent, IJT Records (Producer)
- Faction Zero - Liberation, IJT Records (Producer)
- Hades - Downside, Metal Blade
- Demonspeed:

Kill Kill Kill, Black Pumpkin
Swing is Hell, Black Pumpkin

- Murphy's Law - The Party’s Over, Artemis
- Ghost Orgy - Lullabies for Lunatics, Black Pumpkin
- Redline - Moments of Truth, GSR Music, Black Pumpkin Distribution
- Various Artists - New York’s Hardest, Black Pumpkin
- Driver Side Impact - The Very Air We Breathe, Victory Records
