= Full Collapse =

Studio album by Thursday
- Released: April 10, 2001
- Recorded: November 2000
- Studios: Big Blue Meenie, Jersey City, New Jersey
- Genres: Post-hardcore; emo
- Length: 42:26
- Label: Victory
- Producer: Sal Villanueva

Thursday chronology
Waiting (1999)	Full Collapse (2001)	Five Stories Falling (2002)

Singles from Full Collapse
- 1. "Understanding in a Car Crash" Released: April 2001; 2. "Cross Out the Eyes" Released: June 10, 2002

Full Collapse is the second studio album by American post-hardcore band Thursday. It was released on April 10, 2001, through Victory Records, to whom the band signed after leaving Eyeball Records. With the addition of guitarist Steve Pedulla, recording sessions for the album were held in November 2000 at Big Blue Meenie Recording Studios in Jersey City. Sal Villanueva, who served as the producer, the production team and members of different bands contributed additional instrumentation to the recordings. Full Collapse is considered a post-hardcore album.

Preceded by a two-month United States tour, the album's release was promoted with a short series of shows. The band toured the US in 2001, with BoySetsFire, Waterdown, Rival Schools, and Saves the Day. At the end of the year, the band released music videos for "Understanding in a Car Crash" and "Cross Out the Eyes". In early 2002, keyboardist Andrew Everding joined the band. They went on tour with the Movielife and Sparta and appeared on the Warped Tour soon afterwards. Around this time, the band made it known that they had several issues with Victory Records and its founder, Tony Brummel. Thursday has performed the album in its entirety on tours in 2011 and 2018.

Full Collapse peaked at number 178 on the US Billboard 200. It also appeared on two Billboard component charts: number ten on Heatseekers Albums, and number nine on the Independent Albums. The album received favorable reviews from music critics, many of whom praised the album's musicianship. It is referred to as a classic album within the emo and Screamo genres, and is praised as one of the best emo albums of all time, by publications such as Kerrang!, NME, and Rolling Stone. It also received a prestigious perfect five star rating from AllMusic. It has influenced bands such as As Cities Burn, My Chemical Romance, and Senses Fail.

== Background and production ==
Thursday released their debut album, Waiting, in November 1999 through Eyeball Records. With the band touring more often, all of the members dropped out of Rutgers University. As they lacked a permanent second guitarist, the band had multiple people filling in on guitar. Guitarist Steve Pedulla, whose brother was friends with members of Thursday, joined the band in 2000 after filling in for a show. Eyeball was aware that Thursday was outgrowing what support they could provide, and asked other labels to sign the band. Waiting received enough attention to be noticed by Victory Records, who flew out representatives to watch them play a show in their hometown. By the time the band signed with Victory, they were able to tour full-time. Drummer Tucker Rule said the reason they went with Victory was that the label had previously signed Earth Crisis and Refused. Bassist Tim Payne said Thursday was one of a few acts that strayed from the label's typical hardcore punk style.

After signing, they were told by their friends that they would find themselves in "a situation that we would regret". The members of Thursday were unsure what their friends were referring to – they assumed that the signing would work out fine. They wrote the new songs in a collaborative manner. In comparison, most of the songs on Waiting were written by a single person. The majority of the songs that ended up on Full Collapse were written in the basement of frontman Geoff Rickly's parents' house. They began recording the new album after a US tour. Sessions were held at Big Blue Meenie Recording Studios in Jersey City, New Jersey, with producer Sal Villanueva of metal band Demonspeed. The sessions in November 2000 lasted for 20 days. Tim Giles and Erin Farley acted as engineers, with assistance from Codie Brown. Giles mixed the recordings, before the album was mastered by Timo G. Less at Surgical Sound. The song "Hole in the World" was written as a part of jam session between guitarist Tom Keeley and the members of Circle Takes the Square.

== Music and lyrics ==
Full Collapse has been mainly described as a post-hardcore release, while also being labelled as post-punk, emo pop, hardcore punk, and punk rock. Throughout the album, Rickly's singing switches between crooning to screaming. Full Collapse lacks some of the typical traits of emo in favor of Johnny Marr-like picking in a minor key, against power chords. Members of other bands and members of the production team contributed various instrumentation to the tracks: Farley with additional guitar on "Understanding in a Car Crash"; Joe Darone of the Rosenbergs with additional vocals on "Autobiography of a Nation"; Tom Schlatter of the Assistant with additional vocals on "Autobiography of a Nation" and "Cross Out the Eyes"; Villanueva with additional guitar on "Autobiography of a Nation" and "Wind-Up"; Giles with strings and melotone on "Paris in Flames"; and Frank Giokas of Unsound with additional guitar on "Standing on the Edge of Summer".

The opening track, "A0001", sees Rickly pondering whether a robot is capable of dreaming, as guitar feedback gives way to two snare hits. He said people were "spending so much of our time in front of computers that it's feeling like we're becoming robots". "Understanding in a Car Crash" details the death by car crash of Rickly's girlfriend and best friend and his subsequent visit to the hospital. Rickly said the song was inspired by what they were listening to at the time, Joy Division, and put that "within the realm of hardcore". "Concealer" is a short up-tempo song that is followed by the Cure-esque "Autobiography of a Nation", which talks about genocide. "A Hole in the World" features a guitar riff in the vein of Jawbreaker and ends with a piano part. "Cross Out the Eyes" is the heaviest song on the album, featuring screaming from Schlatter. Rickly said he wrote it about wanting to "obliterat[e] the whole authorial me-me-me-this-is-about-me [stance]"; it was one of the first song he wrote on guitar.

"Paris in Flames" discusses transgender and LGBT activism, as well as mentioning prejudices that a gay friend of Rickly's had faced. "Standing on the Edge of Summer" talks about impending death and reuses a guitar effect heard in "Understanding in a Car Crash". "Wind-Up" begins with a slow verse section that gives way to a screaming chorus, complete with dueling vocals. "How Long Is the Night?" is about Rickly's partner in French class, who would lay on the train tracks behind their school, wishing that the a train would run them over. The album ends with "i1100", which consists of distorted sound effects.

== Release ==
=== Initial touring and promotion ===
Thursday announced Full Collapse on February 5, 2001, for release two months later. The band created hype for the album by touring the United States for two months with bands Midtown, Grey AM, and Every Time I Die. On March 19, 2001, "Cross Out the Eyes" was posted as a free download through Victory Records' website. Full Collapse was released on April 10, 2001 through Victory. The design of the physical was debated: the band hoped to create a booklet of artwork for Full Collapse but were discouraged by Victory founder Tony Brummel who insisted on a less expensive one-page insert without printed lyrics. A compromise was reached, which resulted in the final chosen packaging. The album's release was promoted with a series of shows with Midtown and River City High.

"Understanding in a Car Crash" was released as a single to college radio stations in April 2001. In June 2001, Thursday embarked on an East Coast US tour with Skycamefalling and Fairweather. In July, the band toured with BoySetsFire, Samiam, and the Movielife. Following this, they toured across the US with Waterdown and Drowningman until August. After three shows with Warped Tour, the band toured with Rival Schools. In October, the band toured the West Coast for a week with Murder City Devils and American Steel, before touring the East Coast with Piebald, the Lawrence Arms, and Recover in November. Thursday toured with Hey Mercedes and Saves the Day until the end of the year.

In December 2001, the music video for "Understanding in a Car Crash", which consists of live footage, began airing on MTVX, MTV2, and MuchMusic. Following this, a music video directed by Darren Doane for "Cross Out the Eyes" was released. Doane interpreted the song to be about rebirth and marriage; the video is centered around a guy, who is jobless, single, and offers nothing to society. He is taken by people and has his skin removed, indicating that he is a new person, and sold to a rich woman. As a result of this, he is given marriage status, making him a valuable member of society.

By January 2002, Thursday was gaining feature stories in publications such as Metal Edge and Metal Maniacs. The following month, keyboardist Andrew Everding joined the band. He had been relaxing at Rickly's apartment and was invited to a practice session with the band. The same month, the band toured across the United Kingdom with the Movielife. The music video for "Understanding in a Car Crash" was successful at MTV2, where it stayed in rotation for eight weeks. In March and April 2002, the band went on tour with Sparta. They were denied clearance at the Canada–US border, and as a result, had to cancel a show. Shortly afterwards, the band appeared at the Skate and Surf festival. They had planned to support Face to Face on their headlining US tour, but were replaced by the Movielife.

=== Issues with Victory and subsequent touring ===
In May 2002, as Thursday's signing to Island Def Jam had become imminent, the band released a statement through their website detailing their internal problems with Victory and reasons for leaving. The band said they had higher aspirations for the album art for Full Collapse, which were undone by Brummel's desire to keep costs down. During a visit to Victory's offices, they also discovered that for promotional purposes, the label made Thursday-branded whoopee cushions, which were intended to be distributed to fans at the Warped Tour. They were produced without Thursday's consent and so were discontinued. The band continually emphasized the need to communicate regarding art direction and promotion, but were allegedly ignored by Brummel and told that Victory was too big to run everything past its artists. Rickly recalled that upon signing, the label told them that they wanted Thursday to be their own pop iteration of Saves the Day.

In a meeting with Brummel, he claimed that Thursday was not living up to his expectations, with the band's statement explaining: "Instead of Tony's relationship with us being based on a love for music, it was based entirely on numbers." However, by late 2001, Brummel began showing more concern for the band and called more frequently regarding sales. They soon learned that Brummel planned to sell part of Victory to MCA and, as Thursday's contract only allowed them to leave Victory for a major label, began reciprocating new-found interest from prominent labels. By early 2002, the decision to join Island was made as MCA began promoting Full Collapse as their own, and Thursday found itself in a legal battle with the label. Rickly would later note: "When we parted ways with Victory, we got our asses kicked. [...] Victory's lawyers were so strong."

"Cross Out the Eyes" was released to modern rock radio stations on June 10, 2002. Between late June and mid-August, the band went on the 2002 Warped Tour. Following this, the band appeared at the Bizarre, Pukkelpop, Reading and Leeds Festivals. Though the band were not planning on doing another tour, they appeared at three shows on the Plea for Peace tour. Keeley said the band had heard about the tour from the previous year, and felt it was an appropriate way to end the touring cycle for Full Collapse. Live versions of "Understanding in a Car Crash", "Autobiography of a Nation", "Paris in Flames", and "Standing on the Edge of Summer" would appear on the band's second EP Five Stories Falling (2002). Thursday would later use Victory's lawyers to leave Island in 2007 and reunite with Brummel to work on the live/video album Kill the House Lights (2007). It chronicles the band's career with a documentary and concert footage emphasizing the Full Collapse era. It also features demos and alternate versions of songs from that album.

== Critical reception ==
Professional ratings
Review scores
Source	Rating
AbsolutePunk	95%
AllMusic	5/5 stars
Pitchfork	5.6/10
Punknews.org	4/5 stars
Rock Sound	3/5 stars
Rolling Stone	3/5 stars
Sputnikmusic	4/5
Stylus Magazine	4.5/10

Full Collapse was met with generally favourable reviews from music critics. Chris Collum of AbsolutePunk wrote that "Thursday are something special, something that is almost unique, and this album–of their five–does the best job of getting that across." He said that the album's "biggest draw musically" was the way it moves between the "harsh and abrasive to the ambient and soothing in a matter of mere seconds". Punknews.org founder Aubin Paul said the album "delivers on the promise" of their debut "and then some". He added that there was "some serious intensity here, great powerful riffs, and a singer who can actually sing, and scream." Sputnikmusic staff member DaveyBoy said that while it wasn't the "most immediate album of all time", listeners would be "rewarded as Thursday get the best out of themselves here and hardly put a foot wrong". He praised the musicianship as being "top notch throughout, while the vocals are pleasingly satisfactory".

Ox-Fanzine reviewer Joachim Hiller found that Thursday had "two faces, which on the one hand comes across as super pop, [and] on the other hand relies on the 'Dr. Jekyll & Mr. Hyde' principle when it comes to singing: sometimes gentle, sometimes screamy, then brutal". Stuart Green of Exclaim! wrote that the album "sounds sort of like a jam session showdown between Quicksand and Sense Field". He adds that the band "take us on a wild 14-track ride that starts with the careening "Understanding In a Car Crash" and doesn't stop until some 40 minutes later." The staff at Manila Standard said hardcore fanatics would be "dissatisfied with the mingling of genres but Thursday handles the juggling act well". Wondering Sound contributor Jonah Bayer said Rickly's "strikingly literary musings were packed with so much imagery and iconography that teens all over the country instantly latched onto these post-hardcore anthems".

Rolling Stone's Gavin Edwards found the band to be "peel[ing] the scab off endless varieties of pain" with their lyrics, tackling "heartbreak[, ...] watching a friend die[, ... and] even guilt over genocide". He noted that when the band's guitarwork becomes "slow and subdued, it's because the band is preparing to unleash a withering assault". AllMusic reviewer Kurt Morris wrote that while Thursday was "generating intelligent music", they do their "best to skirt the line of emo-pop without being unexciting or blasé". He said Rickly's vocals were "smooth yet not immature, strong while not being overbearing". Pitchfork contributor Eric Carr said that "after spending some quality time" with the album, he referred to it "as simply 'shit'. [...] Thursday does a few things right, but all in all, this could have been a much better album." Todd Burns of Stylus Magazine wrote that sections of tracks "exhibit obvious skill and technical proficiency, but are quickly ruined by Rickly's vocals or other elements that intrude on the small moments of interest". He says it was overall "a solid second effort for a band in this genre, but money would be best spent" on other albums.

== Commercial performance and legacy ==
Full Collapse reached number 178 on the US Billboard 200. It charted at number ten on the Billboard Heatseekers Albums chart and number nine on the Independent Albums chart. In the first week of release, Full Collapse sold 800 copies, from the 3,400 that were originally shipped to stores. As of October 2008, it sold 380,000 copies.

In February 2009, Thursday announced that they would perform Full Collapse in its entirety for a one-off show on the Taste of Chaos tour. However, on the day of the show, the band cancelled. They eventually performed the album in October 2009, while in the midst of promoting their fifth studio album, Common Existence. To celebrate the tenth anniversary of Full Collapse, Thursday performed the album in its entirety throughout a US tour in 2011. In 2018, the band performed a run of two-night shows where they played Full Collapse on the first night and their third studio album, War All the Time (2003), on the other, in entirety. In a 2010 interview, Rickly described the album's significance to both the band and its fans:

Full Collapse was a record that changed the course and shape of my life. We began touring for it in basements and VFW halls, [...] and ended up as a full-time touring band meeting hundreds of thousands of people with whom we formed deep and lasting connections. Time passes and we embrace new music and different goals but, ten years later, Full Collapse continues to move people and for that we are very grateful. This tour is a celebration of those times and the end of a chapter in the life of Thursday.

According to Drowned in Sound, Full Collapse was "instantly hailed [as] an emo classic" upon release. It has influenced acts such as As Cities Burn, My Chemical Romance, Senses Fail, and This Day Forward (specifically their 2003 release In Response). Rickly would describe Full Collapse as a "turning point record" and strongly favor it over most of the band's other work for both its passion and cohesive feel throughout. It has appeared on various best-of emo album lists, having been named in lists by Consequence of Sound, Drowned in Sound, Houston Press, Kerrang!, NME, and Rolling Stone, as well as by journalists Leslie Simon and Trevor Kelley in their book Everybody Hurts: An Essential Guide to Emo Culture (2007). Similarly, "Understanding in a Car Crash" appeared on a best-of emo songs lists by Stereogum and Vulture. Alternative Press ranked "Understanding in a Car Crash" at number 10 on their list of the best 100 singles from the 2000s. The track has been covered by Wolves at the Gate for their Back to School (2013) EP.

== Track listing ==
Track listing per booklet.

No.	Title	Length
1.	"A0001"	0:36
2.	"Understanding in a Car Crash"	4:24
3.	"Concealer"	2:19
4.	"Autobiography of a Nation"	3:55
5.	"A Hole in the World"	3:27
6.	"Cross Out the Eyes"	4:08
7.	"Paris in Flames"	4:33
8.	"I Am the Killer"	3:35
9.	"Standing on the Edge of Summer"	3:42
10.	"Wind-Up"	4:23
11.	"How Long Is the Night?"	5:45
12.	"i1100"	1:40
Total length:		42:30

== Personnel ==
Personnel per booklet.

Thursday

- Geoff Rickly – vocals
- Tom Keeley – lead guitar
- Steve Pedulla – rhythm guitar
- Tim Payne – bass
- Tucker Rule – drums

Additional musicians

- Erin Farley – additional guitar on "Understanding in a Car Crash"
- Tim Giles – strings and melotone on "Paris in Flames"
- Frank Giokas – additional guitar on "Standing on the Edge of Summer"
- Thomas Schlatter – additional vocals on "Autobiography of a Nation" and "Cross Out the Eyes"
- Sal Villanueva – additional guitar on "Autobiography of a Nation" and "Wind-Up"
- Joe Darone – additional vocals on "Autobiography of a Nation"

Production and design

- Sal Villanueva – producer
- Tim Giles – engineer, mixing
- Erin Farley – engineer
- Codie Brown – assistant engineer
- Timo G. Less – mastering
- Mike Chapman – cover photos
- Dennis Keeley – center photo
- Thursday – design, art direction
- Patrick Larson – design, art direction

== Charts ==
Chart performance for Full Collapse
Chart (2001)	Peak position
US Billboard 200	178
US Heatseekers Albums (Billboard)	10
US Independent Albums (Billboard)	9
