= A Bleeding Heart =

EP by Bleeders
- Released: 2003
- Recorded: June–July 2003
- Genre: Hardcore punk
- Label: Elevenfiftyseven Records
- Producer: Bleeders & Steve Roberts

Bleeders chronology
A Bleeding Heart (2003)	The Bleeders (2005)

A Bleeding Heart is an EP by New Zealand band the Bleeders, released in 2003 and recorded at York Street Studios in Parnell. The EP was repackaged and re-released in Australia in 2005 and renamed The Bleeders. It was put out as an introduction to the band in Australia and to coincide with their Australian shows at the time.

== Track listing ==
1. "Intro"
2. "Channeling"
3. "Sell Out"
4. "Cast in the Shadows"
5. "All That Glitters"
6. "It's Black"
7. "A Bleeding Heart"

== Personnel ==
- Angelo Munro – vocals
- Ian King – guitar/backing vocals
- Hadleigh Donald – guitar/backing vocals
- Gareth Stack – bass/backing vocals
- Matt Clark – drums/backing vocals
