= Washed Up! =

EP by Catch 22
- Released: 1999
- Recorded: 1999
- Studio: Rax Trax Studios
- Genre: Ska punk
- Length: 7:25
- Label: Victory
- Producer: Catch 22, Chris Bauer

Catch 22 chronology
Keasbey Nights (1998)	Washed Up! (1999)	Alone in a Crowd (2000)

Professional ratings
Review scores
Source	Rating
AllMusic	3/5 stars
RateYourMusic	3.12/5 stars
Sputnikmusic	3.5/5 stars

Washed Up! is an EP by American ska-punk band Catch 22 which was released in 1999 through Victory Records. It showcased the sound of Catch 22's second lineup after the departure of frontman Tomas Kalnoky and bassist Josh Ansley.

The last track, "The Death of My Blood Is Your Indulgence," is an ode to their label, Victory, for the label is mostly a hardcore label. The band announced a contest to decipher the lyrics of the song at one point. Three bonus tracks appear after track 4 on some copies.

The tracks of this album, including the bonus tracks, appear on Washed Up and Through the Ringer, Catch 22's compilation album released in 2001.

== Track listing ==
All tracks are written by Catch 22.

Washed Up! track listing
No.	Title	Writer(s)	Length
1.	"Leaving"	Pat Calpin (lyrics), Calpin/Kevin Gunther (music)	2:18
2.	"Hard to Impress"	Gunther (lyrics), Gunther/Calpin (music)	2:06
3.	"American Pie" (Chorus only.)	Don McLean	2:12
4.	"The Death of My Blood Is Your Indulgence"		0:49

All tracks are written by Tomas Kalnoky.

Bonus tracks
No.	Title	Length
5.	"Blowin' in the Wind / On & On & On"	3:47
6.	"Kristina She Don't Know I Exist"	3:03
7.	"9mm and a Three Piece Suit"	1:36

- The last three tracks appear only on certain copies of the album made after 1999.

== Personnel ==
=== Catch 22 ===
- Jeff Davidson – lead vocals
- Kevin Gunther – trumpet, backing vocals
- Ryan Eldred – saxophone, backing vocals
- James Egan – trombone
- Pat Calpin – electric guitar
- Pat "Mingus" Kays – bass guitar
- Chris Greer – drums

=== Additional personnel ===
- Chris Bauer – engineer, producer
- Sean Bonner – graphics
