= Insanity Later =

Studio album by Folly
- Released: April 6, 2004
- Label: Triple Crown Records

Folly chronology
02 Demo (2002)	Insanity Later (2004)	Resist Convenience (2006)

Professional ratings
Review scores
Source	Rating
Allmusic	3.5/5 stars

Insanity Later is the first full-length album from the band Folly, and was released on Triple Crown Records. The album included two songs from their 2002 demo: "Please Don't Shoot the Piano Player, He's Doing the Best He Can", and "The City Is Drowning". Guest vocals include Joey Southside of The Banner, Eric Gunderson of Killed by Memories, and Erin Farley. The title is a reference to the Seinfeld episode The Serenity Now. On the last track "The Weak and the Wounded" a snippet from the film Session 9 appears towards the end of the song, with the character of "Simon" from the film stating "I live in the weak and the wounded Doc..."

== Track listing ==
1. "The Morning Song"
2. "Please Don't Shoot the Piano Player, He's Doing the Best He Can"
3. "Repeat, I Repeat, Repeat"
4. "I've Been Running for Miles, Davis"
5. "Discussion Is for the Pigs"
6. "The Last Letter We Ever Wrote"
7. "Pterodactyls in America"
8. "Serenity Now!"
9. "Today Jeremy Challenges the World"
10. "The City Is Drowning"
11. "Sweet Water Death"
12. "The Weak and the Wounded"
