= Washed Up and Through the Ringer =

Washed Up and Through the Ringer!

Compilation album by Catch 22
- Released: November 20, 2001
- Recorded: 2000–2001
- Venues: St. Andrews Hall, Detroit (tracks 8–13)
- Studios: Big Blue Meenie Recording Studio, Jersey City, New Jersey (songs 1 & 2)
- Genre: Third wave ska
- Length: 48:15
- Label: Victory
- Producers: Tim Gilles, Jason Kanter, Coady Brown

Catch 22 chronology
Alone in a Crowd (2000)	Washed Up and Through the Ringer! (2001)	Dinosaur Sounds (2003)

Professional ratings
Review scores
Source	Rating
AllMusic	2.5/5 stars
Punknews.org	3.5/5 stars
Sputnikmusic	3.5/5 stars

Washed Up and Through the Ringer! is a 2001 album by ska punk band Catch 22. It represents a particularly complicated point in the band's history. Vocalist Jeff Davidson left the band in early 2001, leading the remaining band members to carry out a very public search for a replacement vocalist, going so far as to post an open call for would-be singers on the band's website. Washed Up and Through the Ringer serves as a sort of "history so far" for the band, presenting the 1999 Washed Up! EP in its entirety, three tracks that previously were only available with a limited edition release of Alone in a Crowd, two brand new tracks (one of which, "To Be Continued", was indeed continued as "Chin Up" on 2003's Dinosaur Sounds), and a handful of fan-recorded live tracks from 2000 featuring songs from Alone in a Crowd and Keasbey Nights. This was the band's last studio release for almost two years, during which time they decided to soldier on with no dedicated vocalist.

== Release ==
Washed Up and Through the Ringer! was released in November 2001. Fans enjoyed the band's Washed Up! EP for what it was, but were frustrated that it was a short record, so the band took its four tracks and compiled it with some live tracks and other rarities. The band also took the opportunity to record two new tracks (Straight Forward and To Be Continued) and put it on the album.

In January and February 2002, the band supported the Suicide Machines on their headlining US tour. Following this, the band joined the Victory Records Tour alongside labelmates Grade, Reach the Sky, and Student Rick, until March. In April, the band performed at Skate and Surf Fest. Between September and November, the band toured across the US with Mest and Home Grown.

== Track listing ==
All tracks are written by Catch 22 unless otherwise noted.

Washed Up and Through the Ringer track listing
No.	Title	Writer(s)	Length
1.	"Straight Forward"		2:03
2.	"To Be Continued"		1:17
3.	"Sincerely Yours"		1:08
4.	"One Love/People Get Ready"	Bob Marley	2:42
5.	"Leaving"	Calpin (lyrics), Calpin/Gunther (music)	2:15
6.	"Hard to Impress"	Gunther (lyrics), Gunther/Calpin (music)	2:05
7.	"American Pie"	Don McLean	2:12
8.	"What Goes Around Comes Around" (Live)		2:43
9.	"Hard to Impress" (Live)		3:02
10.	"It Takes Some Time" (Live)		3:55
11.	"Arm to Arm" (Live)		2:29
12.	"Thinking about Things" (Live)		2:00
13.	"American Pie" (Live)		3:34
14.	"No Love for the Roadie"		7:39
15.	"The Death of My Blood Is Your Indulgence"		0:49

Bonus tracks
No.	Title	Length
16.	"Blowin' in the Wind/On & On & On" (Tomas Kalnoky)	3:46
17.	"Kristina She Don't Know I Exist" (Tomas Kalnoky)	3:02
18.	"9mm and a Three Piece Suit" (Tomas Kalnoky)	1:35

== Personnel ==
- Ryan Eldred – saxophone, vocals
- Kevin Gunther – trumpet, vocals
- Jeff Davidson – vocals (tracks 3–18)
- Ian McKenzie – trombone
- James Egan – trombone (tracks 5, 6, 7, and 15)
- Pat Kays – bass guitar
- Chris Greer – drum kit
- Pat Calpin – guitar

=== Additional personnel ===
- Sean Bonner – photography, graphic design
- Coady Brown – recording engineer (tracks 1 and 2)
- Eric Rachel – recording engineer (tracks 3, 4, and 14)
- Jason Kanter – recording engineer (tracks 1 and 2)
- Tim Gilles – recording engineer (tracks 1 and 2)
