= Joe Darone =

American musician and visual artist

Joe Darone (born Joseph Edward McDonald on October 30, 1971), is an American musician and visual artist. He began his recording career at the age of 15 as drummer/art director for the New Jersey pop-punk band, The Fiendz. The Fiendz went on to release four full-length albums; We're the Fiendz, Wact, Dreams, and Cole (on their own Black Pumpkin Records imprint) before his departure in 1999. During this period, Darone also toured and recorded with ex-Misfits guitarist Bobby Steele in The Undead. As a graphic designer, Darone worked under the name Zeckle and has created album covers and logos for a wide range of artists including Madonna and Van Halen.

In 2000, Darone continued in his role as a drummer/art director with the New York power-pop band, The Rosenbergs. In 2001, the band signed with Discipline Global Mobile, founded by King Crimson guitarist Robert Fripp, and released the critically acclaimed Mission: You. That year the band played over 200 shows, touring with Echo & the Bunnymen, Tom Tom Club, and Modern English, in addition to their own Napster-sponsored dates, and also appeared as guests on The Howard Stern Show with Gene Simmons from Kiss. In 2002, Darone recorded the Rosenberg's follow-up, Department Store Girl, produced by Keith Cleversley, before departing. Rosenberg's songs from this era have been featured in Playboy: The Mansion video game, MTV's Undergrads, and the opening theme for the CBS sitcom Accidentally on Purpose.

In 2003, Darone began focusing on writing, and a new project called Suit of Lights emerged, featuring Darone as frontman, featuring playing by Steve Pedulla of Thursday and Jamie Egan from Catch 22 and Streetlight Manifesto. Suit of Lights' début was released in July 2005 on Visiting Hours Records.
