= Resist Convenience =

Studio album by Folly
- Released: February 21, 2006
- Genre: Hardcore, punk, ska
- Label: Triple Crown Records; Bad Time Records

Folly chronology
| Insanity Later (2004) | Resist Convenience (2006) |

Resist Convenience is the second full-length album from Folly. It was released on March 10, 2006, and follows on from their first release, Insanity Later. The songs "False Evidence Appearing Real" and "The Wake" have been featured on their MySpace page. The song "Broken" originally appeared on the band's 2002 Demo. Guest vocals include Logan Laflotte of Paulson. A re-issue of Resist Convenience was later released in 2024 by Bad Time Records.

== Track listing ==
1. "Brooks Wuz Here"
2. "Bonfire of the Manatees"
3. "False Evidence Appearing Real"
4. "Odds > Evens"
5. "The Wake"
6. "Human Bodies"
7. "We Still Believe..."
8. "Historian"
9. "Broken"
10. "Forfeit Sundials"
11. "All the King's Horses"
12. "Operation: Work; Lift-Face"

== Personnel ==
- Jon Tummillo - Vocals
- Geoff Towle - Guitar
- Agim Colaku - Guitar
- Arben Colaku - Bass
- Anthony Wille - Drums
