= Permanent Revolution (album) =

Studio album by Catch 22
- Released: June 27, 2006
- Recorded: January 2006
- Genres: Ska punk; third-wave ska; melodic hardcore; reggae rock
- Length: 33:40
- Label: Victory
- Producer: Catch 22

Catch 22 chronology
Live! (2004)	Permanent Revolution (2006)

Catch 22 studio chronology
Dinosaur Sounds (2003)	Permanent Revolution (2006)

Singles from Permanent Revolution
- 1. "Party Song" Released: 2006

Professional ratings
Review scores
Source	Rating
Allmusic	3.5/5 stars
Sputnik Music	3.5/5 stars
Punknews.org	3.5/5 stars
Absolute Punk	84%
Ultimate Guitar	(9.0/10)

Permanent Revolution is the fourth studio album by American ska band Catch 22, released on June 27, 2006 (July 18, 2006, in Canada), by Victory Records.

== Background ==
Permanent Revolution was recorded in January 2006.

== Composition ==
The album can be classified as a concept album, centered on the life of Leon Trotsky (1879–1940), with the title being named after Trotsky's theory of permanent revolution.

== Release ==
Catch 22 appeared at the Ska Weekend festival in April 2006; following this, they went on a US tour with Patent Pending. On April 25, 2006, Permanent Revolution was announced for release in two months' time. A music video was filmed for "Party Song (1917)" in New York City on June 10, 2006; that same day, "A Minor Point" was posted on the band's Myspace profile. Preceded by a promotional e-card and a stream of the whole album, Permanent Revolution was released on June 27, 2006, through Victory Records. A limited edition 7" vinyl of "Party Song (1917)" was released, available through pre-orders at Interpunk and FYE In July and August 2006, the band appeared on the Summer of Ska Tour in the US and Canada, alongside Voodoo Glow Skulls, Big D and the Kids Table, Suburban Legends, and Westbound Train. Following this, they supported Less Than Jake on their headlining US tour until October 2006. They closed out the year with five headlining East Coast shows, with support from Patent Pending, Bomb the Music Industry!, and Whole Wheat Bread. In May 2007, they appeared at The Bamboozle festival. At the end of the year, they went on tour with Patent Pending.

== Track listing ==
All tracks are written by Ryan Eldred and Ian McKenzie unless otherwise noted.

No.	Title	Writer(s)	Length
1.	"Prologue"		3:10
2.	"The Spark (1902)" (The beginning of Trotsky's political activism)		2:56
3.	"Party Song (1917)" (Communists win control of Russia)		2:44
4.	"The Decembrists' Song (1921)" (Remembering of The Decembrists' Revolt)		3:36
5.	"A Minor Point (1922)" (Soviet Union founded)		2:14
6.	"On the Black Sea (1924)" (Lenin's death)		3:39
7.	"Bad Party (1927)" (Trotsky expelled from party)	Pat Calpin, Ryan Eldred and Ian McKenzie	2:22
8.	"Alma Ata (1928)" (Stalin takes control)	Ryan Eldred/Pat Kays/Ian McKenzie	3:29
9.	"The Purge (1936)" (Stalin gains absolute power by killing any who oppose him)		2:37
10.	"Opportunity (1940)" (Trotsky is exiled from the Soviet Union, then assassinated by a Soviet agent.)		2:37
11.	"Epilogue"	Ryan Eldred/Pat Kays/Ian McKenzie	3:27

== Personnel ==
- Pat Kays – bass guitar, chimes, vocals
- Pat Calpin – guitar
- Ian McKenzie – trombone, vocals, keys, vibraphone
- Ryan Eldred – tenor saxophone, lead vocals, guitar
- Kevin Gunther – trumpet, vocals
- Chris Greer – percussion

=== Additional personnel ===
- Steve Evetts – chimes, producer, engineer, mixing
- Eric Rachel – engineer
- Alan Douches – mastering
- Zak Kaplan – artwork
