= Bleeders (album) =

Studio album by Bleeders
- Released: 2007
- Recorded: July – August 2007, York Street Studios, Auckland, New Zealand
- Genre: Punk rock, Hardcore punk
- Length: 36:40
- Label: Universal Music

Bleeders chronology
As Sweet as Sin (2006)	Bleeders (2007)

Bleeders is the second full-length studio album by New Zealand band, the Bleeders. Frontman Angelo Munro called the album "one of our proudest efforts to date".

== Track listing ==
1. "The Black Widow Creeps" – 3:39
2. "No Hope Left" – 3:56
3. "Stay Away" – 2:54
4. "Inside Your Head" – 2:43
5. "The Price We Pay" – 3:25
6. "She Screamed She Loved Me" – 3:39
7. "Tear It Down" – 2:41
8. "A Great Escape" – 3:05
9. "A Final Goodbye" – 3:07
10. "The Truth" – 3:55
11. "Snap Back to Reality" – 3:31

== Personnel ==
- Angelo Munro – vocals
- Hadleigh Donald – guitars, backing vocals
- Ian King – guitars, backing vocals
- Gareth Stack – bass, backing vocals
- George Kladis – drums
- Samsam – additional vocals on "A Great Escape"

== Chart performance ==
=== Weekly charts ===
Chart (2007)	Peak position
New Zealand Albums (RMNZ)	36
