= Bleeders (band) =

Hardcore band from New Zealand

- Origin: Waitākere, New Zealand
- Genres: Hardcore punk
- Years active: 2002 – 2009, 2019 – present
- Labels: ElevenfiftySeven Records Universal Music NZ
- Members: Angelo Munro; Gareth Stack; Ian King; Aaron Goddard; George Clark
- Past members: Hadleigh Donald

The Bleeders are a punk hardcore influenced group from West Auckland, New Zealand. The group formed in 2002 consisting of members Angelo Munro (vocals), Gareth Stack (Bass), Ian King (Guitar), Hadleigh Donald (Guitar), George Clark (Drums). In 2019, Aaron Goddard replaced Hadleigh Donald on guitar.

== Biography ==
2003 saw their debut release ‘'A Bleeding Heart E.P'’ released on independent label ElevenfiftySeven Records. Quickly Bleeders gained momentum with sold-out shows, strong sales, radio and music television support ultimately leading them to sign with Universal Music NZ.

In 2005, Bleeders flew to the US to record their debut full-length album with producer Sal Villanueva who has produced the likes of Thursday, Taking Back Sunday, and Skarhead. Villanueva worked with the band to create a more crossover sound that would help them reach a broader audience. Titled ‘'As Sweet as Sin'’, the album was released in New Zealand and Australia in 2006, and debuted at number 2 on the New Zealand top 40 charts and went on to reach "Gold" status in sales, as well as picking up the awards for "Best Rock Album" and "Breakthrough Artist" at the 2007 New Zealand music awards.

Bleeders spent the next few years touring in New Zealand and Australia, supported acts such as AFI, Avenged Sevenfold and Motorhead along with shows in the UK with the Misfits. In 2007, the band released the self-titled 2nd album, this time choosing to stay in New Zealand and record at the York Street studio with producer Clint Murphy.

In 2009, the band spent the year based in Toronto, Canada so they could concentrate on the North American market. During their time there they supported the likes of Alexisonfire and Cancer Bats. The band disbanded later that year.

Since their split in 2009, the band have reunited on a couple of occasions, once in 2012, again in 2016, both times to sold-out shows at Auckland's Kings Arms.

In 2019, the band reformed and released the comeback EP “Darkness Falls”. This marked the bands return to their roots teaming up with 1157 records once again. The new EP was released on 12 inch vinyl with the “B side” a remastered version of their debut “A Bleeding Heart E.P”. Throughout 2019 and 2020, Bleeders played a string of shows throughout New Zealand until the beginning of the COVID-19 pandemic.

=== Albums ===
Year	Title	Peak chart positions
Year	Title	NZ
2003	A Bleeding Heart	-
2006	As Sweet as Sin	2
2007	Bleeders	36
2019	Darkness Falls EP	-

=== Singles ===
Year	Single	Album	Chart position
2003	"A Bleeding Heart"	A Bleeding Heart	-
2004	"All That Glitters"	A Bleeding Heart	-
2004	"So Lonely"		25 (NZ)
2005	"Out of Time"	As Sweet as Sin	35 (NZ)
2006	"The Kill"	As Sweet as Sin	-
2006	"Nightmares"	As Sweet as Sin	10 (NZ)
2006	"Silhouettes"	As Sweet as Sin	-
2006	"Night Sky"	As Sweet as Sin	-
2007	"She Screamed She Loved Me"	Bleeders	12 (NZ)

=== Compilations ===
Year	Track	Disc	Compilation released by
2004	"Failed"	Pick of the Litter 2	Puppy*Killer*Records
