= Catch 22 (band) =

American ska punk band

- Origin: East Brunswick, New Jersey, U.S.
- Genres: Ska punk
- Years active: 1996–present
- Label: Victory
- Spinoffs: Streetlight Manifesto
- Members: Ryan Eldred; Pat Calpin; Kevin "K.G" Gunther; James Egan; Chris Greer; Mike Corvasce; Connor Egan
- Past members: Jason Scharenguivel; Todd Seaman; Josh Ansley; Tomas Kalnoky; Jeff Davidson; Ian McKenzie; Mike Soprano; Pat "Mingus" Kays; Dave Solomon
- Website: www.catch22official.com

Catch 22 is an American ska punk band from East Brunswick Township, New Jersey. The band was formed in 1996 by guitarist/vocalist/songwriter Tomas Kalnoky, who left the band in 1998 and later formed Streetlight Manifesto. Founding members remaining in the band are vocalist/saxophonist Ryan Eldred, trumpeter Kevin Gunther, and drummer Chris Greer.

== Biography ==
Catch 22 was fronted by guitarist/vocalist Tomas Kalnoky and drummer Chris Greer who recruited trumpeter Kevin Gunther, who was working in a local record store. Bassist Jason Scharenguivel, saxophonist Ryan Eldred, and trombonist Todd Seaman rounded out the original lineup. Greer, Kalnoky, and Scharenguivel were formerly in "Gimp" before Tomas fronted Catch 22.

The band released a self-produced demo tape, Rules of the Game, in 1997. All 2000 copies of the tape quickly sold out. The band mailed several copies to labels they were interested in working with including Gainesville, Florida's Toybox Records (who had previously released a 7" by Less Than Jake). Toybox was owned and operated by Sean Bonner, who had recently moved to Chicago, Illinois to work at Victory Records. Sean brought the tape to the Victory office and suggested the band be signed.

Scharenguivel and Seaman left the band and was replaced by Josh Ansley and Jamie Egan respectively. The band then signed to Victory Records and produced their first studio album, 1998's Keasbey Nights. Ansley left and was replaced by Pat Calpin. Kalnoky left the band shortly thereafter, deciding (due in part to parental pressure) to continue his education rather than tour. Catch 22 continued on with Pat Calpin moving to guitar, Pat Kays (nicknamed "Mingus") on bass, and Jeff Davidson on vocals. After recording the Washed Up! EP, Egan left the band to continue his teaching career and focus on family life. Alone in a Crowd followed in 2000 with Mike Soprano on trombone. After this release, the band began touring heavily on a national scale, appearing with Mustard Plug, Reel Big Fish, and other third-wave ska, hardcore, and punk acts. Davidson and Soprano left the band in 2001 to pursue other projects, and for a while the band actively courted new vocalists, even putting an advertisement on their website. The group also recruited Ian McKenzie, formerly of Long Island, New York ska band Edna's Goldfish on trombone/vocals.

On February 23, 2002, the band performed at Birch Hill Nightclub in Old Bridge, New Jersey with Gunther as the lead vocalist since Eldred was unavailable that night. Various members from Last Picked, a fellow ska band from Rahway, NJ, volunteered to fill in the horn section.

After a fruitless search, the band decided to continue on as it was, with Ryan Eldred and Kevin Gunther sharing vocal duties. Washed Up and Through the Ringer, an expansion of the Washed Up! EP, was released in 2001, featuring two new songs, three rarities from the Alone in a Crowd era, and a handful of live tracks recorded in October 2000 at Club Laga in Pittsburgh and Euclid Tavern in Ohio.

The band released its third full-length album, Dinosaur Sounds, in 2003, roughly the same time Streetlight Manifesto (a band founded by Tomas Kalnoky and featuring Josh Ansley, Jamie Egan, Jim Conti, and later Mike Soprano as well as former members of the NJ ska band One Cool Guy) released their debut album Everything Goes Numb. Both albums featured supposed veiled attacks on each other, suggesting to many fans that there was some sort of disagreement or heat between Catch 22 and Streetlight Manifesto. While there was a disagreement, the two parties have since reconciled their differences. Catch 22's Kevin Gunther has since been in charge of Streetlight Manifesto's tour booking for many years, and members of both bands have said in conversations with fans that there is no "beef" between the two.

In 2004, Catch 22 released Live, a combination CD and DVD recording of a show performed at The Downtown in Farmingdale, New York, earlier that year.

In 2006, they released their fourth studio album, Permanent Revolution, a concept album centering on the life of Russian Marxist revolutionary Leon Trotsky. Its title was coined after Trotsky's theory of permanent revolution.

In April 2009, the band embarked on a European tour, which included a performance at the Groezrock festival. They played a few Northeastern US shows in August 2009.

In July 2010, former vocalist Jeff Davidson returned as a guest performer to sing a few songs at one show, making it his first performance with the band since 2001. After a few East Coast shows, the band went on a European tour through to August 2010. Davidson joined the band again to perform Alone in a Crowd in full at Starland Ballroom in Sayreville, NJ on January 30, 2016.

In February 2012, Catch 22's official website showed that they would be making an appearance at Bamboozle 2012. After a hiatus, in February 2015, Catch 22 was listed as a performer for Amnesia Rockfest in Montebello, Quebec. Jamie Egan returned to Catch 22 in 2019, replacing Dave Solomon. Mike Corvasce also replaced Pat Kays.

In November 2022, the band played their 100th show as a band, as part of Skanksgiving at Starland Ballroom.

In October 2023, the band confirmed in a Facebook comment that they have been working on material, and would hopefully get something out by 2024. However, that year saw no new releases.

Near the end of April 2024, Jamie's son Connor started performing in the band as a touring member.

On October 5, 2024, Catch 22 played at the Monster Energy Stage at Furnace Fest in Birmingham, Alabama.

On February 21, 2025, it was announced the band will reunite with former lead vocalist Jeff Davidson once again for the 25th anniversary of their album Alone in a Crowd at the Supernova Ska Festival in Fort Monroe, Hampton, Virginia on September 12 to 14, 2025.

At Reggies Chicago, Chicago, IL, Catch 22 performed a new song titled "Lover's Scorn." The song was played acoustically by saxophonist Ryan Eldred a decade prior.

== Music ==
When Tomas Kalnoky was still the band's songwriter, the band had a traditional ska punk sound, and their album Keasbey Nights was one of the most recognized third wave ska albums of the time. During this time, Kalnoky was the band's primary vocalist, while Kevin Gunther provided most of the backing vocals. Keasbey Nights also featured many different instruments not found on later albums, played by Jamie Egan.

After Kalnoky, Egan and Ansley had departed, saxophonist Ryan Eldred became the band's primary songwriter, sharing lyric duties with new lead vocalist Jeff Davidson, and Eldred also became the band's third vocalist. The band's sound leaned more towards a punk rock sound, while still retaining the band's ska punk roots. The album Alone in a Crowd also relied heavily on backing vocals and threeway vocal harmonies provided by Jeff Davidson, Kevin Gunther and Ryan Eldred.

After the departure of Jeff Davidson, both Eldred and Gunther took over lead vocal duties. The older material was distributed evenly between the two, but Eldred was selected as main vocalist for the band's new songs. The album Dinosaur Sounds saw the band's sound depart even more from ska punk, towards alternative rock, which resulted in the alienation of some fans.

2006's Permanent Revolution saw the band return to its ska punk roots, while also borrowing influences from jazz, reggae and alternative rock. The album was also a concept album, one of the first in the ska punk scene.

== Members ==
=== Current ===
- Ryan Eldred – tenor saxophone, backing vocals (1996–present), lead vocals (2001–present)
- Kevin Gunther – trumpet, backing vocals, lead vocals (1996–present)
- Pat Calpin – guitar, backing vocals (1998–present), bass (1998)
- James Egan – trombone, backing vocals (1996–1999, 2019–present), flute (1998)
- Chris Greer – drums (1996–present)
- Mike Corvasce – bass (2019–present)
- Connor Egan – trombone (touring) (2024–present)

=== Former ===
- Jason "Jay" Scharenguivel – bass, backing vocals (1996–1997)
- Todd Seaman – trombone, backing vocals (1996-1997)
- Tomas Kalnoky – lead vocals, guitar (1996–1998)
- Jeff Davidson – lead vocals (1998–2001, 2010, 2016, 2025)
- Josh Ansley – bass, backing vocals (1997–1998)
- Mike Soprano – trombone, backing vocals (1999–2001)
- Ian McKenzie – trombone, backing vocals (2001–2014)
- Pat "Mingus" Kays – bass, backing vocals (1998–2019)
- Dave Solomon – trombone, backing vocals (2015–2019)

=== Line-ups ===
Period	Members	Releases
1996 - 1999	Tomas Kalnoky – guitar, lead vocals; Ryan Eldred – saxophone, vocals; Kevin Gunther – trumpet, vocals; Todd Seaman – trombone, vocals (1996 - 1997); James Egan – trombone, flute (joined 1997); Jason Scharenguivel – bass guitar (1996 - 1997); Joshua Ansley – bass guitar (1997-1998); Pat Calpin – bass guitar (joined 1998, 1998-1999); Chris Greer – drums	Rules of the Game Keasbey Nights
1999 - 2001	Jeff Davidson – lead vocals (1998 - 2001); Ryan Eldred – saxophone, vocals; Kevin Gunther – trumpet, vocals; James Egan – trombone (1999); Mike Soprano – trombone (1999 - 2000); Ian MacKenzie – trombone (joined 2000); Pat Calpin – guitar; Pat "Mingus" Kays – bass guitar (joined 1999); Chris Greer – drums	Washed Up! Alone in a Crowd Washed Up and Through the Ringer!
2001–present	Ryan Eldred – saxophone, lead and backing vocals; Kevin Gunther – trumpet, lead and backing vocals; Jeff Davidson – lead vocals (2010, 2016); Ian McKenzie – trombone (2001 - 2015); Dave Solomon – trombone (2015 - 2019); James Egan – trombone (2019–present); Connor Egan – trombone (2024–present); Pat Calpin – guitar; Pat "Mingus" Kays – bass guitar (1999 - 2019); Mike Corvasce – bass guitar (2019–present); Chris Greer – drums	Dinosaur Sounds Live Permanent Revolution

== Discography ==
=== Studio albums ===
- Rules of the Game (1996)
- Keasbey Nights (1998)
- Alone in a Crowd (2000)
- Dinosaur Sounds (2003)
- Permanent Revolution (2006)

=== Live records ===
- Live (2004)

=== EPs ===
- Washed Up! (1999)

=== Compilations ===
- Washed Up and Through the Ringer (2001)

=== Singles ===
- "Party Song" (2006)

=== Music videos ===
- "Keasbey Nights" (1998)
- "Point the Blame" (2000)
- "Hard to Impress" (2001)
- "Wine Stained Lips" (2003)
- "Party Song" (2006)
