= Wildlife (La Dispute album) =

Studio album by La Dispute
- Released: October 4, 2011
- Recorded: November 2010, April 2011
- Studios: Drasik Studios, Chicago; StadiumRed, New York
- Genres: Post-hardcore; progressive rock
- Length: 57:50
- Label: No Sleep
- Producer: La Dispute

La Dispute chronology
Never Come Undone (2011)	Wildlife (2011)	Rooms of the House (2014)

Singles from Wildlife
- 1. "Harder Harmonies" Released: August 23, 2011; 2. "The Most Beautiful Bitter Fruit" Released: September 9, 2011

Wildlife is the second studio album by American post-hardcore band La Dispute, released October 4, 2011, on independent label No Sleep Records. Recording sessions for the album took place primarily at StadiumRed in New York City in April 2011. The band members took control of all of the production duties alongside the album's recording engineers, Andrew Everding and Joseph Pedulla. Wildlife was their last release on No Sleep Records before forming their own record label, Better Living.

Noted by music writers for its varied elements, Wildlife incorporates musical components from La Dispute's previous releases, particularly Somewhere at the Bottom of the River Between Vega and Altair and Here, Hear III., and genres such as screamo, progressive rock and post-rock. The album features lyrical themes that – while making several references to the band's home town of Grand Rapids – focus on personal loss, anger, despair, and in the vision of the band, is a collection of unpublished "short stories" from a hypothetical author, complete with the author’s notes and sectioned thematically by the use of four monologues.

The album debuted at number 135 on the US Billboard 200 chart, selling 3,140 copies in its first week. It spent one week on the chart and charted only in the United States. Prior to its release, Wildlife was promoted with two singles, "Harder Harmonies" and "The Most Beautiful Bitter Fruit". The album was well received by critics, who mainly praised its conceptual lyrics and more melodic approach to the band's style.

== Writing and recording ==
The writing of the album did not start until a year after La Dispute's debut album, Somewhere at the Bottom of the River Between Vega and Altair, was released. Part of the reason for the delay was the band's continuous touring and promotion of the debut across the United States and Canada, with rare tour and festival appearances in Europe and Australia. When commenting on the delay between the band's album releases, singer Jordan Dreyer said he and the rest of the band members require "an absurdly long gestation period with these types of things and then we have to really sit down and be as meticulous as we all want to be". The band decided to use lyrical elements that they had intended to use in the first album but that were not included because they did not seem fully developed at the time. While writing Wildlife, the band had very specific goals; they projected the album to have 14 tracks and knew exactly what they wanted from each song.

La Dispute wrote and recorded Wildlife in pieces to accommodate their intense tour schedule. The album was recorded at two different studios with recording engineers Andrew Everding and Joe Pedulla. They started with the instrumentation of six tracks at Drasik Studios in Chicago; this recording process took place over two weeks. The songwriting featured on the album is distinct from La Dispute's previous releases. Dreyer wrote the stories or the concepts behind each song, and then the band adapted these stories into lyrics and created music to revolve around them. In an interview, Dreyer was asked how the songwriting differs; he said that the lyrics were written before the music was composed. He was quoted as saying: "This time around, we switched the process up entirely. Previous to Wildlife, we'd always start music first and add vocals later based on the way the song felt. This time around, because we had a more concrete concept going into it, and because we wanted to work even more as a single unit [...]" Dreyer and the rest of La Dispute had expressed interest in writing a conceptual record, but with ambiguity so it would not limit the listener's experience. "Oftentimes, I think records with a linear narrative narrow the ways in which a person can enjoy it, and not everyone wants to sit down and listen to something front to back." When they returned from their touring in Australia in February 2011 they "dropped off the face of the earth" for two months, during which their writing sessions lasted twelve to fourteen hours a day.

La Dispute recorded the remainder of the album in a month in StadiumRed in New York City in April 2011. Dreyer wanted to give the album the most organic feel possible by using no artificial reverb or studio techniques that would give the album a synthesized quality. Joe Pedulla stated that he wanted to give the album a more raw and authentic sound: "We were just trying to capture what it would be like for an audience member sitting and listening to a guitar in a room." He also credited Dreyer's vocal range: "Jordan Dreyer has this crazy dynamic range – a 20dB swing from how loud and quiet he gets. So there are some vocal parts with no resonance at all, where he's speaking/singing softly, the room is not echoing, and he sounds close and in-your-face. Then the dynamic swing happens, and we would see how big it can get." When recording vocals, Dreyer makes very long takes, trying to emulate the sound of his voice in live performances. The album's recording features what the band considers "auxiliary instrumentation", including trumpet and rhodes piano, and even improvised instruments that Sterenburg's brother created out of scrap metal.

== Title and packaging ==
The title Wildlife is not derived from lyrics from the album, but from themes that connect the songs. Dreyer regards wildlife as "an all-encompassing word to sum everything up", and he has said that "we all witness tragedy and change. It's the summation of our existence." On the inside of the album cover the words "To – for everything" are written as a dedication with a word being crossed out. It has been speculated by some that the word is the name 'Helen'. Drummer Brad Vander Lugt when asked about the dedication replied "That’s Jordan’s story to tell, and not mine. [...] It does have significance to a story he is telling. You will probably hear a little bit more about that in future work, Jordan has been known to continue stories or themes onto future albums."

== Composition ==
Edit Your Hometown
'Edit Your Hometown' tells a tale of struggle and fuses the introspectiveness of emo with hardcore punk dynamism.

King Park
The song 'King Park' is a seven-minute ballad and has been described as the centrepiece to the whole album. Highlights the band's use of singing-speaking vocal style and matured lyrics inspired by loss and despair on songs about gang violence to a backing of "delicate fingerpicked work and ripping chords" as described by Joshua Khan of Blare.

=== Music ===
The music on Wildlife, akin to the band's first album, incorporates elements of post-hardcore, screamo, progressive rock and post-rock, described as having "bluesy quirks and experimental touches" by Alex Reeves of The 1st Five. Compared with the first album, Wildlife has melodic tendencies and a more synchronized approach to musicianship and vocals, with fewer unusual time signatures and more emphasis on chord progressions. There is less hardcore punk-style screaming, but as in the band's earlier work, the vocal style alternates between singing and speaking. The song structures are often unconventional. Wildlife utilizes instrumental passages to complement the lyrics; Reeves described it by saying that "the music expertly builds tension, creating a sense of visceral emotion and releasing this tension in a well-timed burst".

=== Lyrics ===
The first one is kind of an examination of different people’s search for purpose and what other people apply to their lives to give it some sort of semblance for order. The second one is kind of similar, but [relating to] more drastic responses. It’s isolation, or immersion — far to the left, far to the right thing. The third one is the point in the record where the character gets himself some perspective on his own struggles by examining the struggles of others. The last one is kind of a summation of the two ongoing narratives throughout the record: one being the stories that are told, the other being those four monologues.

— Jordan Dreyer commenting on the record's monologues in an interview in 2011.

Dreyer had always stated that the band's second album would feature "a lot of storytelling", "a lot of groove", and "a more of an organic feel" than their debut album. When describing the sound of the album the band wrote that they believe it is "musically more heavy and more soft, more fast and more slow, more complicated and more straight-forward, and I know my band mates would agree, so there isn't really a thing this record sounds like, at least not that we can hear." With writer Vladimir Nabokov's works Pale Fire and Lolita being considered as the "biggest external influence" on Wildlife, the album features dark lyrical themes which focus on personal loss and the anger and despair felt from watching one's hometown decay.

In the vision of the band the album is a collection of unpublished "short stories" from a hypothetical author, complete with the author's notes, and sectioned thematically by the use of four monologues. The stories are told in parallel to the author's own ambiguous loss and struggle, and the lyrics are a combination of Dreyer's fictional stories and his interactions in life, including true stories from La Dispute's home town, Grand Rapids. The four monologues in question project the loss and the struggle of the artist with the introduction 'a Departure', and the three interludes, 'a Letter', 'a Poem' and 'a Broken Jar'. The first two monologues of Wildlife were used to "capture a general feeling". 'a Poem' and 'a Broken Jar' are noted for using spoken word and alternative folk-influenced melodies to spark melodramatic feelings.

'St. Paul Missionary Baptist Church Blues' focuses on the decaying value of a real life abandoned church in Grand Rapids and how that was a striking contrast to the popularity of other churches. 'Edit Your Hometown', has been described as "treading the boundary between melodrama and actual drama" by Ben Patashnik of 'Rock Sound'. 'The Most Beautiful Bitter Fruit' deals with the hypothetical author's sexuality, by exploring and questioning his inability to participate in casual sex.

'King Park', a seven-minute ballad, focuses on inner-city gang culture and follows the perspective of an individual who is engrossed by a drive-by shooting; and also follows how the drive by shooter, plagued by guilt, commits suicide. Dreyer described the true story behind the song: "A year or two ago, down the street from where Brad and I work, a kid was shot. It's an area that's been riddled with gang violence, which has been really sad to witness."

'Edward Benz, 27 Times' is the story of a father dealing with the pain of being brutally attacked by his schizophrenic son, while "I See Everything" describes parents losing their seven-year-old son to cancer.

== Release and promotion ==
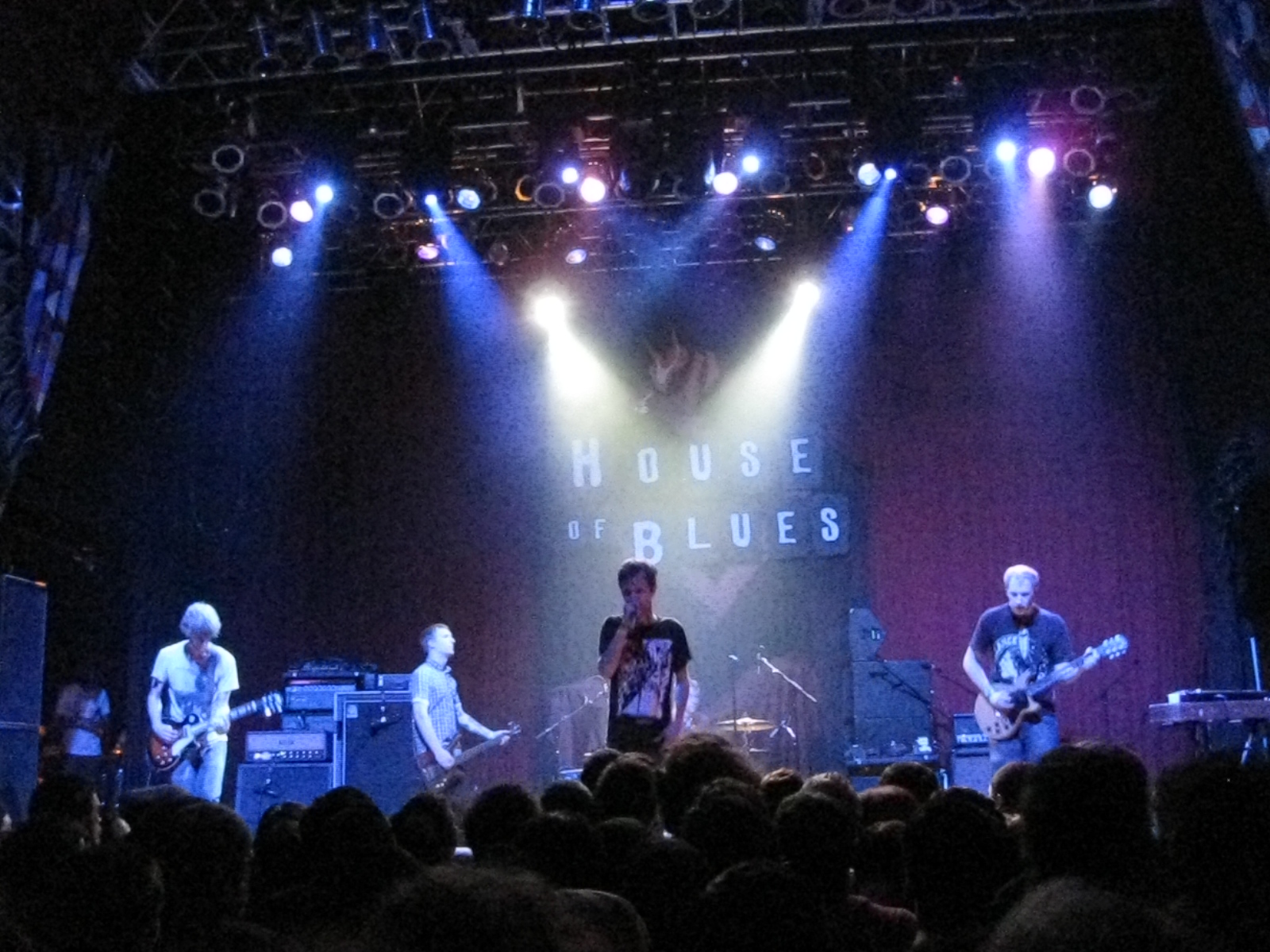
La Dispute performing in 2011. During the initial promotion of the album the band refrained from performing selected songs, such as "King Park", which they believed were too "emotionally draining" for live shows.

Throughout their European tour in August 2011, La Dispute performed a new song titled "Edit Your Hometown". Once the tour was finished, La Dispute wrote a blog post titled "Arrivals" that announced the track listing, the album art, and the first single, titled "Harder Harmonies." It became available to stream on August 23, 2011, in conjunction with the album's announcement. On September 9 the seventh track, "The Most Beautiful Bitter Fruit" was released online to stream. On September 23, La Dispute uploaded the entire album to stream on their official website and Facebook page. The album was released internationally on October 4, 2011. On October 26, 2011, Wildlife was released in Germany with German alternative magazine Visions. They promoted the initial release of the album by supporting Thrice's headline tour across the United States in October and November 2011.

For one day on December 25, 2011, La Dispute made all of their discography, including Wildlife, free to download with an opportunity to donate money to 826michigan, a Michigan-based, non-profit organization dedicated to supporting students ages 6 to 18 with creative writing and to helping teachers to inspire their students to write. Donations on that day totaled $1,600.

Throughout 2012 La Dispute went on a series of headline tours that acted as promotion for Wildlife, with tour legs in Europe, Australia and North America. La Dispute's European tour took place over January and early February with support from Former Thieves. Their Australian tour started four days after their European tour, and instead of having a permanent support band, they had a different lineup every night, composed of local bands. The North American leg of the tour started in late March, lasting into June and had support from Balance and Composure, Sainthood Reps, and All Get Out. At their shows in the United States in April, the band collaborated with 826michigan once again to release 150 limited-edition packets at their shows. These packets included their CD "Conversations", which annotates the lyrical themes in Wildlife in depth, along with rare photos, a poster, postcards and other items. In June 2012, the band made several festival appearances in Europe including Download Festival, Greenfield Festival, Hurricane Festival and Southside Festival, during a short European tour with Hot Water Music. La Dispute planned to do a third European tour with Title Fight and Make Do and Mend in September and October 2012.

As La Dispute have promoted their music on headline tours they have tried to play different songs and create a different experience for each live show. They have also used songs after a certain period of time: an example is 'King Park', which although was initially considered too emotionally draining for live performances, the band eventually started to play the song live. The band played 'St Paul Missionary Baptist Church Blues' from Wildlife at its first performance in September 2012.

== Reception ==
=== Critical reception ===
Professional ratings
Review scores
Source	Rating
AllMusic	5/5 stars
Alternative Press	4.5/5 stars
Rock Sound	9/10
Sputnikmusic	4/5 stars

The album received favorable reviews from critics. Alex Reeves of The 1st Five gave a positive review of Wildlife favoring its lyrical depth and intimacy, comparing the album's lyrics to "reading the tear-stained diary of a good friend". Chrysta Cherrie, writing for Allmusic, gave the album a perfect score of five stars and credited the album for its maturity and progression from the band from their debut, saying: "Wildlife is the best of both worlds, serving up the energy and power fans have come to expect from La Dispute, but showing a maturity beyond the band’s years." Joshua Khan on Blare Magazine gave the album a 4.5 out of 5 star rating, describing the album's four monologues as "tormented progressive rock outbursts" and describes the instrumentation as bringing character to the vocals and lyrics.

Daniel Roe, writing for Rockfreaks, acknowledged the album's large stylistic shift from "blistering hardcore punk inspired" musicianship towards simpler chord progressions. Channing Freeman of Sputnikmusic gave an appreciative review of the album while praising its lyrical improvements over the predecessor, describing the album overall as "a wake-up call for post-hardcore bands."

Negative opinions about the album stemmed from its lyrical content. Some critics have said that the serious nature of the lyrics are hard to digest. Others said Dreyer's lyrics and vocals still overshadow the instrumentation. Alex Andrews of Thrash Hits gave the album a four out of six rating, saying: "The flipside of Dreyer's imposing presence is that it can be all too easy to let the rest of the band fade into the background. It's a shame, because for the most part, there are some interesting things happening".

=== Commercial performance ===
La Dispute's record label No Sleep produced 5,000 copies for Wildlife's first pressing, adamant that they would all sell. In the United States the album debuted on the Billboard 200 at number 135, selling 3,140 copies of the album in the first week. Of those copies, 1,192 were 7" vinyl.

=== Accolades ===
In the year of Wildlife's release it featured in some end-of-year lists, including those by Rock Sound and Kill Your Stereo. Rock Sound placed the album at 19 out of their top 50, stating "some bands ask for you attention, on Wildlife La Dispute demand it." The album was also on Kill Your Stereo's "Staff International top 10" list, being placed at 7 out of 10.

== Track listing ==
All tracks are written by Jordan Dreyer, Brad Vander Lugt, Chad Sterenberg, Kevin Whittemore and Adam Vass.

No.	Title	Length
1.	"A Departure"	3:32
2.	"Harder Harmonies"	3:35
3.	"St. Paul Missionary Baptist Church Blues"	3:46
4.	"Edit Your Hometown"	2:55
5.	"A Letter"	3:49
6.	"Safer in the Forest/Love Song for Poor Michigan"	4:36
7.	"The Most Beautiful Bitter Fruit"	3:55
8.	"A Poem"	2:59
9.	"King Park"	6:54
10.	"Edward Benz, 27 Times"	5:45
11.	"I See Everything"	3:37
12.	"A Broken Jar"	2:19
13.	"All Our Bruised Bodies and the Whole Heart Shrinks"	5:04
14.	"You and I in Unison"	4:56
Total length:		57:50

Notes

- In the tracks "A Departure", "A Letter", "A Poem", and "A Broken Jar", the "A" in each is stylized as lowercase (e.g. "a Departure").
- The track "All Our Bruised Bodies and the Whole Heart Shrinks" is stylized as all lowercase.

== Personnel ==
La Dispute

- Jordan Dreyer – lead vocals, lyrics, percussion
- Chad Sterenburg – guitar, synthesizer, percussion, vocals, glockenspiel, trumpet
- Adam Vass – bass guitar, vocals, guitar, baritone guitar
- Kevin Whittemore – guitar
- Brad Vander Lugt – drums, percussion, keyboards, claps, bells, tambourine, shaker, triangle, chimes, guiro, box stomps, foot stomps, metal grate, chains, piano

Additional liner notes

- Adam Vass – album artwork and layout
- Andrew Everding, Joseph Pedulla, and La Dispute – production
- Joseph Pedulla and Andrew Everding – engineers
- Keith Parry – assistant engineer
- Joseph Pedulla – mix engineer
- Ricardo Gutierrez – mastering engineer

== Charts ==
Chart (2011)	Peak position
US Billboard 200	161
US Top Rock Albums (Billboard)	38
US Independent Albums (Billboard)	27
US Top Alternative Albums (Billboard)	25
US Heatseekers Albums (Billboard)	6
