= No One Was Driving the Car =

No One Was Driving The Car

Studio album by La Dispute
- Released: September 5, 2025
- Recorded: November–December 2024
- Genres: Post-hardcore; spoken word; emo
- Label: Epitaph Records
- Producer: La Dispute

La Dispute chronology
Here, Hear IV (2023)	No One Was Driving The Car (2025)

No One Was Driving The Car (stylized in all caps) is the fifth studio album by American post-hardcore band La Dispute. It was released on September 5, 2025, through Epitaph Records. It is the band's first studio album in six years, following Panorama (2019).

== Background and recording ==
On November 19, 2024, La Dispute frontman Jordan Dreyer announced via the band's Patreon that the band would soon begin recording their fifth studio album. He explained that this shift in focus had delayed the planned 10th-anniversary content for their 2014 album, Rooms of the House. Dreyer revealed that the new album would be titled No One Was Driving The Car. The title was inspired by a quote from a police officer regarding a fatal self-driving Tesla crash in Spring, Texas, in 2021. The phrase was reported in local news coverage of the incident. Dreyer noted that the phrase resonated with him, leading to a creative exploration of themes such as technology, systems of control, and personal responsibility.

The album was recorded from late November to mid-December 2024, with the band sharing daily photos of the recording process on their Patreon page. The album's concept delves into the complexities of existence, examining how individuals navigate chaos and seek meaning in their lives.

== Promotion and singles ==
On May 13, 2025, La Dispute announced their first new album in six years, No One Was Driving The Car, scheduled for release on September 5, 2025, via Epitaph Records. The announcement was accompanied by the release of the first act of the album, which includes the singles "I Shaved My Head," "Man with Hands and Ankles Bound," and "Autofiction Detail." A music video for "I Shaved My Head," directed by Steven Paseshnik, was also unveiled on the same day.

In the lead-up to the album's release, La Dispute has been sharing detailed explanations of each act of the album through their Patreon page. These posts provide insight into the thematic and conceptual elements of the album, offering fans a deeper understanding of its narrative structure and artistic direction.

Additionally, the band has announced an extensive tour in support of the album, beginning in Europe on July 10, 2025, and continuing into North America in September. The North American leg of the tour will commence on September 5, 2025, in Detroit, Michigan, and will include performances in cities such as Toronto, New York, Atlanta, and Nashville.

== Composition and themes ==
The album has been described by Dreyer as exploring human agency, control, and existential uncertainty. Central themes include technology and its influence on modern life, systems of societal and personal control, and the search for meaning in a chaotic world. Dreyer characterizes the record as reflecting the experience of navigating life while frequently feeling at the mercy of forces beyond one’s control, including chance, societal pressures, and broader systemic forces.

== Track listing ==
No.	Title	Length
1.	"I Shaved My Head"	3:28
2.	"Man With Hands and Ankles Bound"	3:18
3.	"Autofiction Detail"	4:52
4.	"Environmental Catastrophe Film"	8:41
5.	"Self-Portrait Backwards"	2:51
6.	"The Field"	3:59
7.	"Sibling Fistfight at Mom’s Fiftieth / The Un-Sound"	4:00
8.	"Landlord Calls the Sheriff In"	4:40
9.	"Steve"	4:01
10.	"Top-Sellers Banquet"	8:18
11.	"Saturation Diver"	3:37
12.	"I Dreamt of a Room With All My Friends I Could Not Get In"	4:14
13.	"No One Was Driving the Car"	3:19
14.	"End Times Sermon"	5:03
Total length:		1:04:21

== Personnel ==
La Dispute

- Jordan Dreyer – vocals
- Brad Vander Lugt – drums
- Chad Morgan-Sterenberg – guitar
- Corey Stroffolino – guitar
- Adam Vass – bass

Production

- Produced by La Dispute
- Engineered by Connor Massey
- Mixed by Scott Evans at Antisleep
- Mastered by Heba Kadry
- Album art by Adam Vass

== Charts ==
Chart performance for No One Was Driving the Car
Chart (2025)	Peak position
German Rock & Metal Albums (Offizielle Top 100)	13
US Top Current Album Sales (Billboard)	46
