= Ordinary Silence =

Studio album by Mixtapes
- Released: June 25, 2013
- Recorded: 2013
- Studio: Moonlight Studios
- Genre: Pop punk, indie rock
- Length: 36:41
- Label: No Sleep Records
- Producer: Eric Tuffendsam

Mixtapes chronology
Vision Quest (2012)	Ordinary Silence (2013)	Mixtapes/Jabber (split) (2015)

Professional ratings
Review scores
Source	Rating
punknews	4.5/5 stars

Ordinary Silence is an album by Ohio-based pop punk band Mixtapes.

== Background ==
The second full-length album released by Mixtapes, the album was released in just under a year after their debut full-length album Even on the Worst Nights. Originally intending to release an EP before the 2014 Warped Tour, the band found themselves with enough songs to make a full-length album.

== Track listing ==
No.	Title	Length
1.	"Bad Parts"	3:12
2.	"Ross (Dirty Water)"	2:41
3.	"Elevator Days"	2:52
4.	"C.C.S."	3:03
5.	"Like Glass"	2:24
6.	"gravel (interlude)"	0:47
7.	"Happy and Poor"	3:06
8.	"I Think I Broke it"	2:15
9.	"You Look Like Springtime"	3:38
10.	"Cheapness"	1:58
11.	"Everything's Eventual"	2:01
12.	"A List of Things I Can't Handle"	2:53
13.	"Swirling"	3:02
14.	"Be the Speak that You Change About"	2:49

== Personnel ==
- Ryan Rockwell – vocals, guitar, bass guitar
- Maura Weaver – vocals, guitar
- Boone Haley – drums
