= Vancouver (EP) =

2006 EP by La Dispute

EP by La Dispute
- Released: April 14, 2006
- Recorded: Dynamite Sound Project, Grand Rapids, Michigan
- Genre: Experimental rock, metalcore, post-hardcore, screamo
- Length: 30:20
- Label: Friction Records
- Producer: Peter Degraw, La Dispute

La Dispute chronology
Vancouver (2006)	Somewhere At The Bottom Of The River Between Vega And Altair (2008)

Vancouver is the debut EP by the band La Dispute, released April 14, 2006. This was the first release the band made under their new label Friction Records after signing with them in 2004.

Professional ratings
Review scores
Source	Rating
Under the gun review	8/10 stars

== Track listing ==
No.	Title	Length
1.	"Future Wars"	2:57
2.	"A Word of Welcome and Warning"	2:30
3.	"See You in Vancouver"	4:09
4.	"To Withstand the Force of Storms"	4:34
5.	"He Is Here, He Is Not Afraid"	4:50
6.	"The Surgeon and the Scientist"	4:27
7.	"Fairmount"	5:12
8.	"Untitled"	1:41
Total length:		30:20

== Personnel ==
Personnel per booklet.

La Dispute

- Jordan Dreyer – vocals, lyrics, production
- Brad Vander Lugt – drums, percussion, production
- Derek Sterenberg – guitars, production, composer
- Kevin Whittemore – guitars, production
- Adam Kool – bass, production, composer

Additional personnel

- Peter DeGraw – recording, production, mixing, sound engineer
- Kertis Lytle – artwork, design
