= Andrew Koji Shiraki =

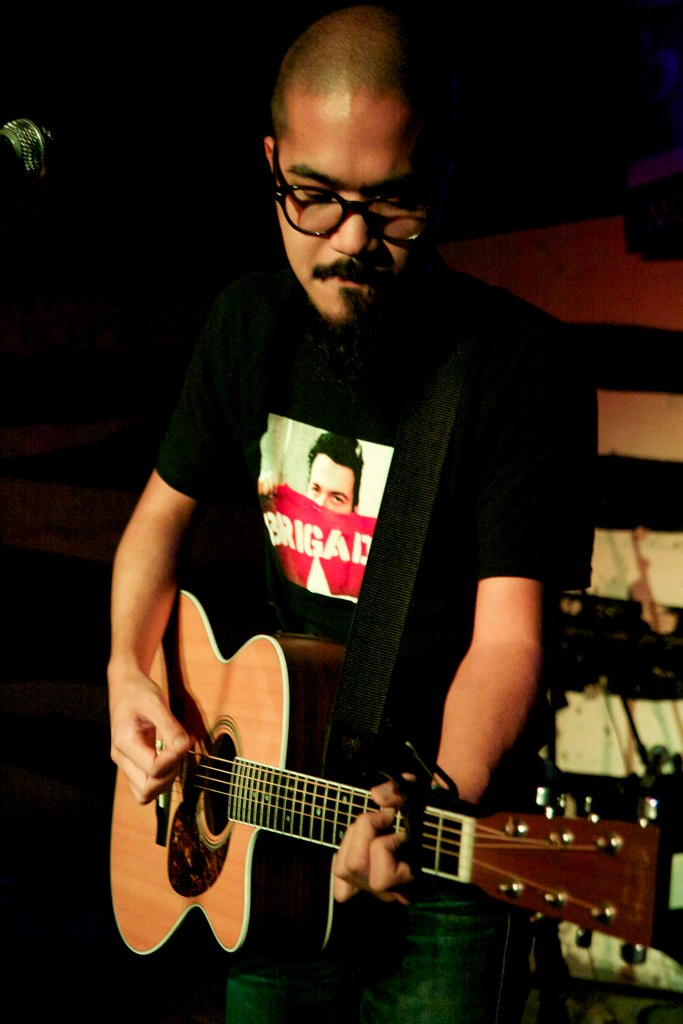
- Koji on tour with one-man band Into It. Over It. 2011.

Background information
- Also known as: Koji
- Born: February 12, 1987 (age 39); Harrisburg, Pennsylvania, United States
- Genres: Folk, pop punk, indie rock, hardcore punk
- Occupations: Singer, songwriter, designer, photographer, activist
- Labels: The Native Sound; Run For Cover Records; No Sleep

Andrew Koji Shiraki (born February 12, 1987, in Harrisburg, Pennsylvania, United States), also known by their stage name Koji, is an American songwriter and activist.

== Career ==
In August 2010, Shiraki signed with Run For Cover Records releasing a live EP titled, Spring Song Vol. 1 and their critically acclaimed full band EP, Some Small Way. In October 2010, Koji released their first of two split releases on No Sleep Records, IIOI/KOJI, and collaborated with La Dispute on Never Come Undone EP released on No Sleep Records. In 2011, Koji was named one of Alternative Press's "100 Bands do You Need to Know". Since 2010, Koji has toured and performed with a wide range of artists that have included Into It. Over It., La Dispute, Never Shout Never, Code Orange Kids and also played the entirety of Warped Tour 2012.

Koji was reported to have finished tracking their debut full-length with producer, Will Yip, at Studio 4 in Conshohocken, Pennsylvania. The album personnel included long time collaborator, Brad Vander Lugt of La Dispute, on drums, as well as Matt Warner of Balance and Composure and Ned Russin of Title Fight on bass.

On December 11, 2012, it was announced that Koji would be performing as part of the Acoustic Basement tour with Geoff Rickly of Thursday, Vinnie Caruana of I Am the Avalanche/The Movielife, A Loss For Words and Brian Marquis in February 2013.

On March 26, 2021, the compilation record Sunday, Someday will be released on Get Better Records, and it features Koji, Potty Mouth, Nervus, Solstice Rey, and Full on Mone't.

== Activism ==
Koji founded the organization COLORMAKE, as a collaborative effort between artists and activists from all over the country. In an effort to bring everyone together all artists, the organization began organizing music and gallery shows, skate and bike jams, workshops, festivals, political demonstrations and other events.

They have partnered with both creative and policy advocacy groups such as The Voice Project and RESOLVE on the issue of the LRA in Central Africa. Koji has also performed and spoken at universities in support of NPO's such as Falling Whistles.

== Discography ==
- "Autumn Dreaming" (December 21, 2024)
- Keeping Count 7" (February 9, 2016; The Native Sound)
- Fury EP (June 16, 2015; No Sleep)
- Matters EP (November 12, 2013; The Native Sound)
- Crooked in My Mind (April 30, 2013; Run For Cover)
- "Distance/Divide" 7" (February 2013; Run For Cover)
- Never Come Undone (Split 12" with La Dispute; May 3, 2011; No Sleep)
- IIOI/KOJI (Split 12" with Into It. Over It.; November 23, 2010; No Sleep)
- Some Small Way EP (November 9, 2010; Run For Cover)
- Spring Song Vol. 1 (September 28, 2010; Run For Cover)
