= Searching for a Pulse/The Worth of the World =

EP by Touché Amoré and La Dispute
- Released: July 27, 2010
- Genres: Post-hardcore; emo; screamo; melodic hardcore
- Label: No Sleep

Touché Amoré chronology
...To the Beat of a Dead Horse (2009)	Searching for a Pulse/The Worth of the World (2010)	Parting the Sea Between Brightness and Me (2011)

La Dispute chronology
Here, Hear III. (2009)	Searching for a Pulse/The Worth of the World (2010)	Never Come Undone (2011)

Professional ratings
Review scores
Source	Rating
Absolutepunk	86%
Rockfreks.net	(9/10)
Caught In the Crossfire	(Favourable)
Punknews.org	4.5/5 stars

Searching for a Pulse/The Worth of the World is a split EP between American post-hardcore bands Touché Amoré and La Dispute. It was released on July 27, 2010, through No Sleep Records. The EP was the first split release for both bands and consists of two original songs from each band, all four of them featuring both vocalists.

== Background ==
Jordan Dreyer, the lead vocalist of La Dispute when interviewed was asked the reasons behind why they recorded the extended play and he states it was because of the close relationship his band shares with Touché Amoré, saying: "Both our bands share similar ideologies and approaches to music, so it made sense to collaborate on something". Further commenting on how both he and Jeremy Bolm wanted the record to flow consistently between the music and lyrics: "so La Dispute tried to be aware of Touché’s strong points and tendencies musically throughout the writing process to give the record a pretty steady feel despite being from two different bands."

== Release and promotion ==
No Sleep Records initially announced its release in May 2010 and was being planned for July 27, 2010 in the United States. The release was distributed on 7" vinyl which came with free digital downloads of the songs. The first pressing of the release included three color variations: 500 Black/Gold Marble, 500 Black/Beige Marble and 1000 Black. 75 were produced exclusively for the 2010 Sound and Fury festival in Santa Barbara, California which included Touché Amoré on the line-up. The festival was cut short however because of riots that broke out. It was released in the United Kingdom on September 14, 2010, in which it sold out in seconds. British magazine journal Rock Sound began to stream the tracks off the EP to coincide with its release in the United Kingdom. Combining its three pressings, Including 48 copies made exclusively for Record Store Day 2012, 6,148 copies have been pressed since its release.

== Track listing ==
No.	Title	Length
1.	"I'll Get My Just Deserve" (Touché Amoré featuring Jordan Dreyer)	1:34
2.	"I'll Deserve Just That" (Touché Amoré featuring Jordan Dreyer)	1:44
3.	"How I Feel" (La Dispute featuring Jeremy Bolm)	2:04
4.	"Why It Scares Me" (La Dispute featuring Jeremy Bolm)	3:33
Total length:		8:55

== Personnel ==
Touché Amoré

- Jeremy Bolm – vocals
- Clayton Stevens – guitars
- Nick Steinhardt – guitars
- Tyler Kirby – bass guitar
- Elliot Babin – drums

La Dispute

- Jordan Dreyer – vocals, percussion
- Brad Vander Lugt – drums, keyboards, percussion
- Chad Sterenberg – guitars
- Kevin Whittemore – guitars
- Adam Vass – bass guitar, additional guitars
