= Never Come Undone =

EP by La Dispute and Koji
- Released: May 3, 2011
- Genre: Acoustic music, indie rock
- Length: 15:38
- Label: No Sleep Records

La Dispute chronology
Searching For A Pulse/The Worth Of The World (2010)	Never Come Undone (2011)	Wildlife (2011)

Koji chronology
IIOI/KOJI (2010)	Never Come Undone (2011)	Crooked in My Mind (2013)

Professional ratings
Review scores
Source	Rating
Alter The Press!	3.5/5 stars
Absolute Punk	(85%)
Rockfreaks	(7/10)

Never Come Undone is an EP by La Dispute and Koji, released on May 3, 2011, by No Sleep Records. This is the second split EP for both bands. The EP has one new song from each band, as well as a reimagining of "Last Blues for Bloody Knuckles" by La Dispute and a cover of Ted Leo and the Pharmacists's "Biomusicology" by Koji. The vinyl press was limited to 2,000 copies; 500 purple and black, 500 purple and 1,000 black.

== Track listing ==
No.	Title	Length
1.	"Sunday Morning, at a Funeral" (La Dispute)	2:48
2.	"Peacemaker" (Koji)	2:55
3.	"Last Blues" (La Dispute)	4:17
4.	"Biomusicology" (Koji)	5:38
Total length:		15:38

== Personnel ==
La Dispute

- Jordan Dreyer - lead vocals, lyrics
- Brad Vander Lugt - drums, keyboards, percussion
- Chad Sterenberg - guitar
- Kevin Whittemore - guitar
- Adam Vass - bass guitar, additional guitars

Koji

- Andrew Koji Shiraki - lead vocals, lyrics, guitar
