= Worst Party Ever =

American emo band

- Origin: Sarasota, Florida
- Genres: Midwest emo; emo pop
- Years active: 2014–present
- Label: No Sleep Records
- Members: Andrew "Andy" Schueneman; Kou Nakagawa; Taiyo Kinoshita; Taro Ohta-Weir
- Past members: Michael Galvano; Benjamin Durshimer; Kyle Meggison; Matthew Boerner

Worst Party Ever is an American emo band from Sarasota, Florida. It was formed in 2014 by Andrew "Andy" Schueneman and has gone through various lineups, with the current one as of 2026 being Schueneman (rhythm guitar, vocals), Kou Nakagawa (drums), Taiyo Kinoshita (lead guitar), and Taro Ohta-Weir (bass). In 2021, the band released their first-full length studio album, Dartland, after relocating to Seattle the year prior.

== History ==
Worst Party Ever was formed in 2014 by Andrew "Andy" Schueneman in Sarasota, Florida. The band has gone through various lineups since; in 2018, it was made up of Schueneman, Michael Galvano, Benjamin Durshimer, and Kyle Meggison. By that year, the band had become locally known in South Florida's regional scene. They had taken a year-long hiatus in 2017 and returned in July 2018 with the release of the album Japan, which consisted of acoustic demos of songs that they planned to have on their album Year of the Manatee. Japan contained themes of drug abuse, alcoholism, and self-worth. They had previously been recording the demos on iPhone or Yeti microphones and planned to phase out of acoustic works when they began working in a studio to record. In February 2020, the band released the EP here, online with No Sleep Records. Later that year, No Sleep Records began a beef on Twitter with label Triple Crown Records, claiming that Worst Party Ever's here, online was better than Dogleg's Melee. In response, Worst Party Ever covered Dogleg's song "Star 67". In response, Dogleg re-recorded Worst Party Ever's 2018 song "Ganon Main".

In 2020, the band relocated to Seattle. They released their first full-length album, Dartland, in December 2021, garnering a lukewarm review from Pitchfork. The album, recorded in the midst of the COVID-19 pandemic, contained lyrics about a man who likes spending a lot of time at home. In 2023, the band canceled the rest of the shows on their tour due to Schueneman's "toxic" and "manipulative" behavior towards his partner.

== Influences and artistry ==
Schueneman noted Joanna Newsom's vocal patterns to be influential to his style of writing; he also named The Microphones, Nana Grizol, and post-Adam Tigers Jaw as inspirations. The band has also been compared to Mom Jeans, Charmer, Title Fight, and A Great Big Pile of Leaves. On Worst Party Ever's 2021 album Dartland, Ian Cohen of Pitchfork likened the band to Joyce Manor with Rob Schnapf's production.

== Discography ==
=== Studio albums ===
Title	Details
Japan	Released: July 8, 2018; Label: Self-released; Formats: Digital download
Dartland	Released: December 17, 2021; Label: No Sleep Records; Formats: LP, CD, cassette, Digital download

=== Compilation albums ===
Title	Details
Anthology	Released: April 19, 2017; Label: Self-released; Formats: LP, Cassette, digital download

=== Extended plays ===
Title	Details
Cool Year	Released: December 17, 2018; Label: Self-released; Formats: Cassette, digital download
here, online	Released: February 14, 2020; Label: No Sleep Records; Formats: LP, CD, cassette, digital download

=== Singles ===
Title	Year	Album
"what about you?"	2020	here, online
"False Teeth"	2020	here, online
"Prism on a Window"	2021	Dartland
"Beautiful Out"	2021	Dartland
"All You Can Post Card"	2024	Non-album single
