= Castle Songs =

EP by Mixtapes
- Released: February 1, 2011
- Recorded: 2011
- Genre: Pop punk; indie rock; acoustic
- Length: 1:41
- Label: Death to False Hopes

Mixtapes chronology
Thought About Growing Up (2010)	Castle Songs (2011)	Hope Is for People (2011)

Professional ratings
Review scores
Source	Rating
Punknews.org	4.5/5 stars

Castle Songs is a short EP by Ohio-based pop punk band Mixtapes. It is their shortest release so far.

== Track listing ==
No.	Title	Length
1.	"Cause I'm A Genius"	0:32
2.	"Hey Baby"	1:09

== Personnel ==
- Ryan Rockwell – vocals, guitar
- Maura Weaver – vocals, guitar
- Michael Remley – bass
- Boone Haley – drums
