= Here, Hear. =

EP by La Dispute
- Released: May 15, 2008
- Recorded: 6th April 2008, Grand Rapids, Michigan, Modern Hardware Warehouse
- Length: 7:03
- Label: Forest Life Records
- Producer: La Dispute

La Dispute chronology
Untitled 7" (2008)	Here, Hear. (2008)	Here, Hear II. (2008)

Here, Hear. is an EP by La Dispute, released on May 15, 2008 through Forest Life Records. The extended play contains a series of spoken-word tracks that focus on combining pieces of pre-existing poetry and writings with a variety of instrumentation.

== Release ==
Released originally as a 7" Vinyl with 300 copies distributed in only one colour permuatation: white. It also accompanied the first 100 sales of the Untitled 7".

With the release of the third EP in the series on December 24, 2009, the first three volumes became available for download off Bandcamp; all proceeds will benefit well House Community Living of Grand Rapids, a non-profit outreach program in Grand Rapids that provides emergency shelter and permanent housing for homeless families. When the period of donation ended on January 17, 2010, La Dispute was able to raise $1715.44 for Well House. All subsequent donations went towards covering recording expenses of the band.

== Lyrical themes ==
Here, Hear. uses poetry and writings from various artists: "One" is based upon Tom Robbins' Still Life with Woodpecker. "Two" is lyrics from the poem "somewhere i have never traveled" by E. E. Cummings. "Three" is based upon Edgar Allan Poe's poem "Annabel Lee". While "Four" is based upon an Asian myth, and the lyrics are amalgamations of different versions on the story. This story is the ground work for the lyrical theme of their debut album Somewhere at the Bottom of the River Between Vega and Altair.

== Track listing ==
All tracks are written by La Dispute.

No.	Title	Length
1.	"One"	1:31
2.	"Two"	1:46
3.	"Three"	1:45
4.	"Four"	2:01
Total length:		7:03

== Personnel ==
- Professional ratings
  Review scores
  Source	Rating
  Absolute Punk	80%
  Jordan Dreyer - lead vocals
- Brad Vander Lugt - drums, keyboards, percussion
- Chad Sterenberg - guitar
- Kevin Whittemore - guitar
- Adam Vass - bass, additional guitars
