= La Dispute (band) =

American post-hardcore band

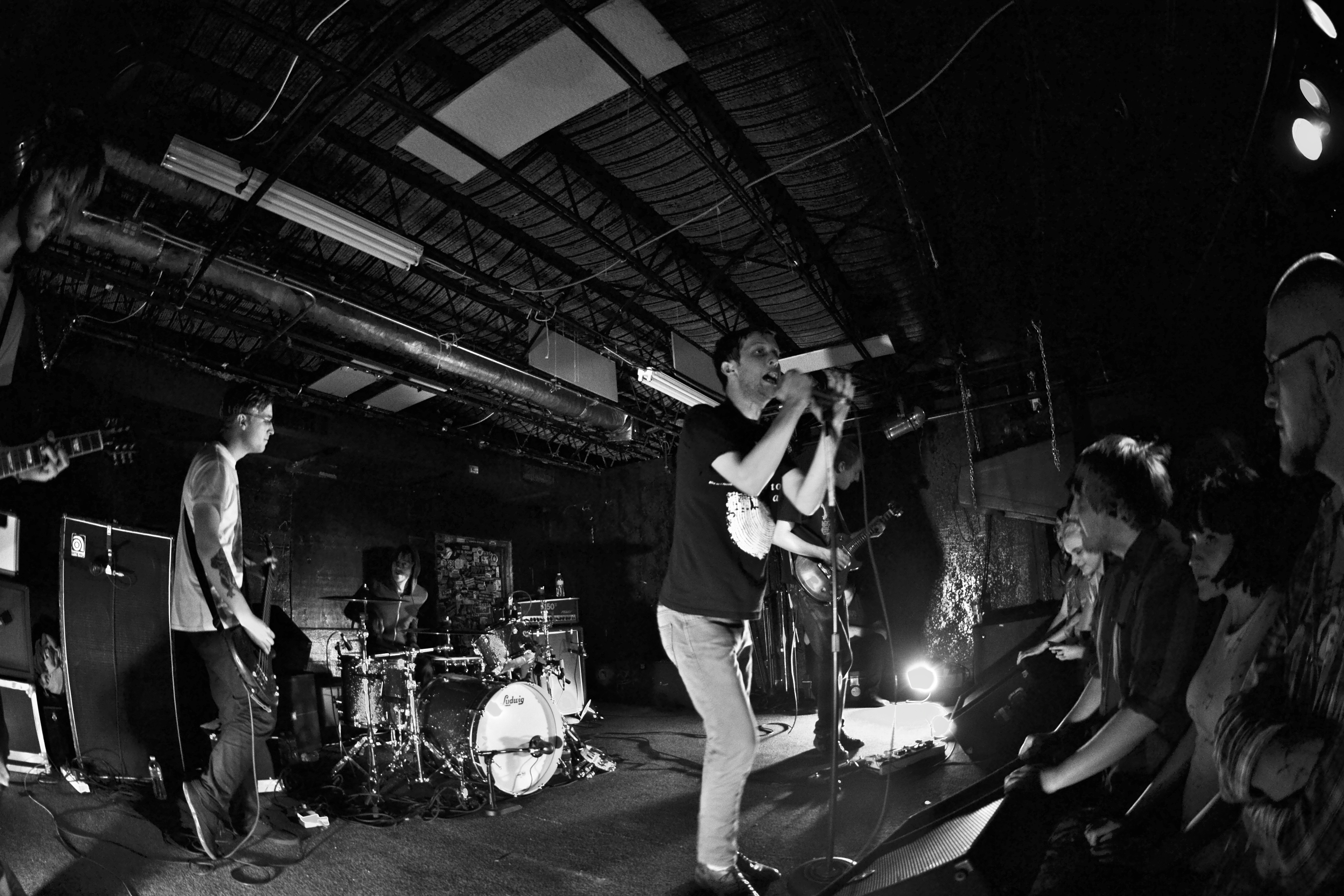
- La Dispute playing live in Iowa City, Iowa in 2012

Background information
- Origin: Grand Rapids, Michigan, U.S.
- Genres: Post-hardcore; progressive rock; screamo; spoken word
- Years active: 2004–present
- Labels: No Sleep; Forest Life; Friction; Better Living; Big Scary Monsters; Epitaph
- Members: Jordan Dreyer; Brad Vander Lugt; Chad Morgan-Sterenberg; Adam Vass; Corey Stroffolino
- Past members: Kevin Whittemore; Adam Kool; Derek Sterenberg
- Website: ladispute.org

La Dispute is an American post-hardcore band from Grand Rapids, Michigan, formed in 2004. The current lineup is vocalist Jordan Dreyer, drummer Brad Vander Lugt, guitarist Chad Morgan-Sterenberg, guitarist Corey Stroffolino, and bass guitarist Adam Vass.

The band released their debut EP, Vancouver, in 2006 on Friction Records and then temporarily signed to Forest Life Records where they released Here, Hear. and Untitled 7" in May 2008. Their debut album Somewhere at the Bottom of the River Between Vega and Altair was released in conjunction with Here, Hear II. on No Sleep Records in November 2008. Here, Hear III. (2009), The Worth of the World (2010) and Never Come Undone (2011) then followed before releasing their second studio album, Wildlife (2011). Their third studio album, Rooms of the House, was released on March 18, 2014. Panorama, their fourth studio album, was released on March 22, 2019, almost exactly five years later. Their fifth studio album, No One Was Driving the Car, was released on September 5, 2025.

== History ==
=== Formation, early years and Vancouver (2004–2007) ===
La Dispute was formed in Grand Rapids, Michigan in late 2004 by cousins Jordan Dreyer and Brad Vander Lugt, Kevin Whittemore, Derek Sterenberg and Adam Kool; Dreyer was never a singer and did not write any music prior to forming the band but was a writer, primarily writing poetry and short fiction. During this time the band mainly played house shows or at the Division Avenue Arts Collective (a volunteer-run DIY music venue, community center, and art gallery) in downtown Grand Rapids. Chad Sterenberg replaced his older brother Derek in 2006 the day after the release of their debut EP, Vancouver (released April 14, 2006), which was the only release the band produced while on the Friction Records roster. Indiana-based friend of the band Adam Vass later joined in 2007. It wasn't until the loss of Derek Sterenberg and Adam Kool that they took the project seriously.

=== Here, Hear. I, II & III and Somewhere at the Bottom of the River Between Vega and Altair (2008–2009) ===
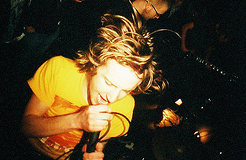
La Dispute's vocalist Dreyer performing live in January 2010.

La Dispute signed to Southern California-based record label No Sleep Records in early 2008. Jordan Dreyer describes this move to the label as sharing a similar perspective on music, stating: "The primary attraction with No Sleep for us was that it was obvious through talking to Chris [Hansen] that his intentions with the label were in line with ours as a band." To fill in the gap between their debut release Vancouver and their upcoming album the band released an exclusive vinyl record, Untitled 7", consisting of two tracks which were extra songs from the writing sessions of their debut album. Also in May, the EP Here, Hear. was released, which would soon follow sequels, with Dreyer stating: "Here Hear we did as a challenge to ourselves creatively as a way to expand our horizons and also broaden the context for anyone else who is interested in checking who we are as a band". On November 11, 2008, La Dispute released their debut album Somewhere at the Bottom of the River Between Vega and Altair through No Sleep Records. La Dispute recorded the album at StudiOtte in Grand Rapids with Joel and Troy Otte. The album's lyrical themes base around an Asian folk tale regarding the plight of a prince and a princess who are separated after marriage by a river they are not allowed to cross. The album doesn't use this concept strictly and uses it as more of a "jumping off point for similar struggles that people face." It was well received by critics, with positive reviews from AbsolutePunk, Alternative Press, Punknews.org, and Sputnikmusic. They played three release shows to support the album in their home state of Michigan: on November 8 at Skelletones, November 14 at the UAW Retirees Hall in Traverse City, and November 22 at the Howell Opera House in Howell. Their debut album was released simultaneously with the second extended play in their "Here, Hear experiment": Here, Hear II. The EP also accompanied the first 300 sales of the album.

On December 25, 2009, La Dispute Released Here, Hear III. The EP was self-released via digital download off their Bandcamp page. Released as well on Bandcamp were Hear, Hear., Hear, Hear II., Untitled 7" and a two track Christmas EP titled Winter Tour Holiday CD-R, which featured two Christmas songs: a cover of "'Twas The Night Before Christmas" and an original song, "First Snow in Silent Grand Rapids". Although they became free to download, it was possible to donate money; all donations went to benefit the Well House Community Living of Grand Rapids, a non-profit outreach program in Grand Rapids that provides emergency shelter and permanent housing for homeless families. The period of donation ended on January 17, 2010, and $1715 was raised for Well House. All subsequent donations after the period have gone towards covering recording expenses for the band.

=== The Worth of the World, Never Come Undone and Wildlife (2010–2012) ===
Throughout April and May 2010, La Dispute supported Alexisonfire across the United States alongside Trash Talk and Therefore I Am. La Dispute and Touché Amoré released a 7" extended play titled Searching for a Pulse/The Worth of the World on September 14, 2010, which was co written by all members of both bands and features vocal cross-overs from the vocalists. Progress on the recording of La Dispute's second studio album began as early as November 2010. The album was recorded in pieces to wrap around their intense tour schedule, starting with the recording of instrumentation for six tracks in Drasik Studios in Chicago. In April, they revealed that the album would be 14 tracks long, and revealed that they had been progressively modifying the music over the length of the tour. La Dispute accompanied Alexisonfire again on a Canadian leg of a tour in November and December 2010. On this tour, they played alongside Norma Jean and Four Year Strong.

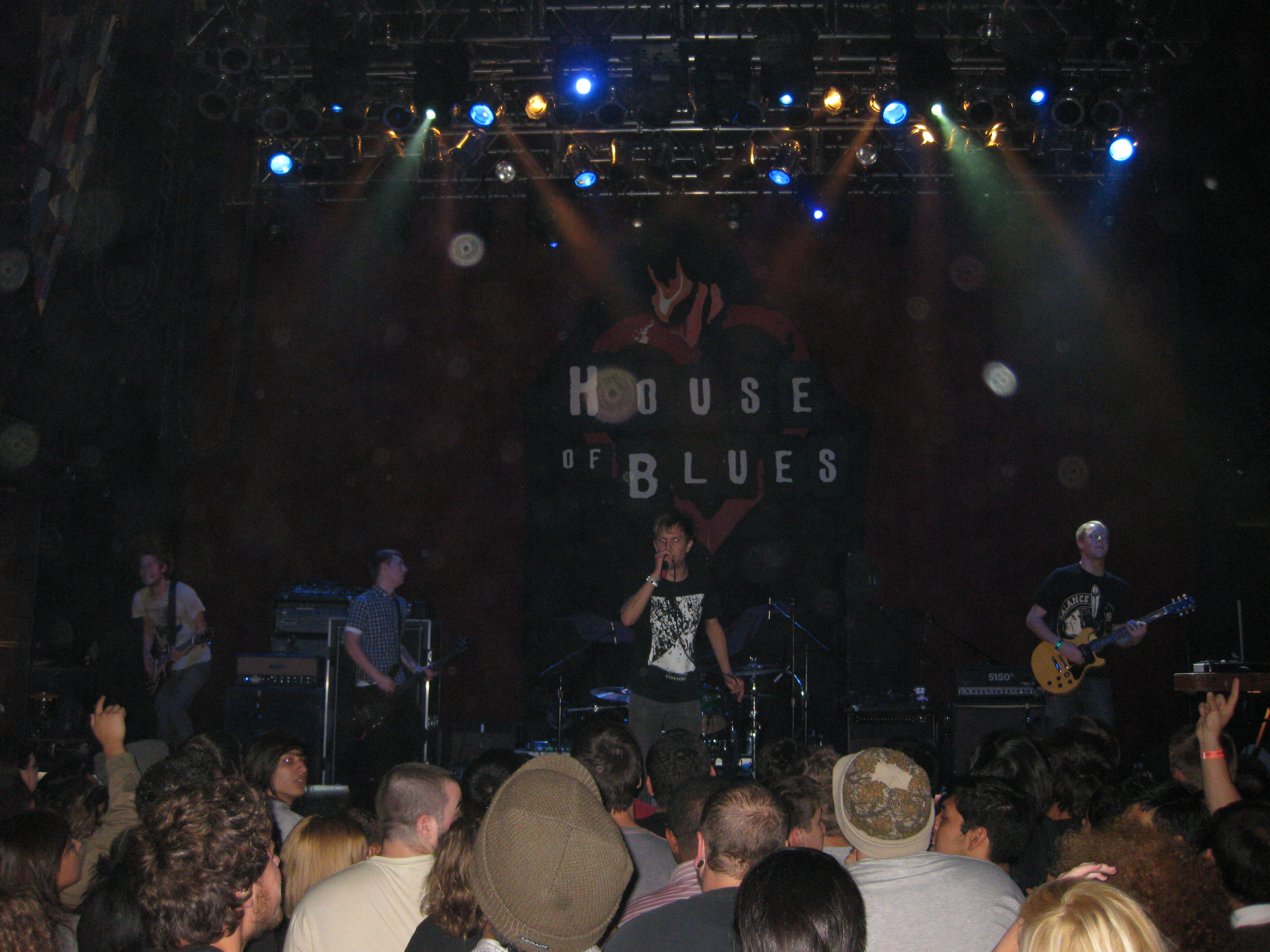
La Dispute in 2011; left to right: Sterenberg, Vass, Dreyer, and Whittemore

The band went into StadiumRed studio in New York City in March 2011 to record the remainder of the album. Andrew Everding, the keyboardist of Thursday and producer Joe Pedulla served as recording engineers at both studios. On May 3, 2011, La Dispute released a split EP with American acoustic singer-songwriter Andrew Koji Shiraki (Koji), titled Never Come Undone. The split featured La Dispute performing an acoustic rendition of "Last Blues For Bloody Knuckles," a song from their album, Somewhere at the Bottom of the river between Vega and Altair. Their second contribution was an original song titled "Sunday Morning, at a Funeral." On July 5, La Dispute started a Canadian tour with Make Do and Mend and No Sleep Records associates Balance and Composure. The focus of this tour was to promote the release of Never Come Undone.

La Dispute, Touché Amoré and Norwegian hardcore punk band Death Is Not Glamorous completed a European tour, which started July 27, 2011 and finished August 12, to coincide with both La Dispute's and Touché Amoré's appearances at Hevy Festival in the United Kingdom, Fluff Fest in Czech Republic and Ieperfest in Belgium in 2011. On August 23, La Dispute announced the title of their second album, and revealed the track listing and album art. The album, titled Wildlife, was released on October 4, 2011. Lyrically, Jordan Dreyer has described the album as being "... set-up as a collection of sort of stories/poems annotated by the author and split into thematic sections by four monologues." Vocalist Jordan Dreyer considers the album a lyrical experiment with elements they intended to use in the first album. The announcement of the new album was accompanied by a complete re-design of their website, themed around the album's "Wildlife" design. Two singles were released digitally prior to its release, "The Most Beautiful Bitter Fruit" and "Harder Harmonies". On September 30, La Dispute joined Thrice, Moving Mountains, and O'Brother on a tour around the United States, which finished November 11.

Throughout 2012, La Dispute embarked on a series of headlining tours, which acted as promotion for Wildlife, with tour legs in Europe, Australia and North America respectively. La Dispute's European tour took place in January and early February, with support from Former Thieves. Their Australian tour started four days after their European tour ended, and instead of having a permanent support band they had a different lineup every night that was composed of local bands. The North American leg of the tour started in late March and lasted until the beginning of May. This tour had support from Balance And Composure, Sainthood Reps, and All Get Out. They made several festival appearances in the summer of 2012 including Download Festival Greenfield Festival, Hurricane Festival and Southside Festival. After their Wildlife tour the band spent 2012 on a vacation of sorts. On April 13 and 14 respectively the band recorded two different live studio sessions, with Audiotree and Violitionist Sessions, making their last tour appearances in September and October on a European tour with Title Fight and Make Do And Mend.

=== Rooms of the House and departure from No Sleep Records (2013–2017) ===
In 2013, the band made their first tour appearance in supporting Hot Water Music across the United States in January and February. La Dispute's performance on the tour was met with positive reception, with comparison to the other bands on the lineup, they were considered "more on the hardcore side of the spectrum." Before the tour started on January 12, the band performed at The Crofoot to headline a two-stage show with bands Into it. Over it., Koji, The Swellers, Cheap Girls, Mixtapes, Pity Sex, Tiger! Tiger!, and Pentimento In June 2013 the band toured Australia for the fourth time being supported by Pianos Become the Teeth. The idea of Pianos Become the Teeth supporting La Dispute came about as the members of both bands are close friends and had wished to tour together, however their touring schedules have always clashed. On the band's website a countdown timer was added that hinted at a new album announcement on December 16, 2013. On December 16, along with a completely revamped website, La Dispute announced that their new album Rooms of the House will be released on March 18, 2014, and will be co-produced by Will Yip. They also announced that they left No Sleep Records and started their own label, Better Living. The album was released via Big Scary Monsters in the UK and Europe.

In April 2014, founding member and guitarist Kevin Whittemore departed from the band. He played his final show with the band on April 14, 2014, in Cleveland, Ohio.

Throughout 2014 the band played over 70 shows in 16 countries around the world. ROTH was noted in several end of year lists including: Paste's "50 Best Albums of 2014", Consequence of Sound's "Top 50 Songs of 2014" and Alternative Press' "10 Essential Albums of 2014". The band was also listed as one of Paste magazines "top 25 live acts".

In June 2016, the band toured around the United States and Canada with Thrice and Gates. Then, later that month Thrice announced a tour of the US and Canada with La Dispute and Nothing, Nowhere from September to October 2016.

When asked by Substream Magazine in 2016 whether their documentary "Tiny Dots" was the end of a chapter or novel, La Dispute responded, "We did record the album, the film is a celebration of that, but at the same time there is no obvious next step for the band. We don't know if this is the end of the novel, but we figure then that this documentary is a fitting way to close it."

Following the album’s 10th anniversary, a previously unreleased B-side, Elster Stares the Desert Down, was released on May 30, 2024.

=== Somewhere at the Bottom of the River re-issue and Panorama (2018–2021) ===
On August 7, 2018, the band announced they would be releasing a re-worked version of Somewhere at the Bottom of the River Between Vega and Altair for the album's 10th anniversary. The re-issue featured newly processed versions of the original guitar and bass recordings, as well as a new mix and master. Alongside this announcement, the band also released a new version of "The Castle Builders" taken from the album, and revealed they would be touring the United States with Circa Survive beginning in October 2018.

On September 17, it was announced that the band had signed to Epitaph Records for their fourth studio album, Panorama.

The first two songs from the album, Rose Quartz and Fulton Street I, premiered on December 4 via NPR's All Songs Considered and featured an animated music video by Sarah Schmidt.

On January 9, the 8th track "Footsteps at the Pond" was debuted with another animated music video by Daisy Fernandez.

Panorama was released on March 22, 2019. A remix album was released on December 25, 2019.

=== Post-pandemic, anniversary tours and No One Was Driving The Car (2021–present) ===
In June 2022, La Dispute announced a belated 10-year-anniversary tour for Wildlife. The North American leg took place in September and October 2022 and was joined by Sweet Pill and Pictoria Vark. The band confirmed via Twitter that they would take the tour to the UK, the EU and Australia "at some point in the near future", which ultimately came to fruition in 2023. In March 2024, the band announced five shows to celebrate the 10-year anniversary of Rooms of the House. The shows took place in London, Amsterdam, Berlin, Sydney and the band’s hometown of Grand Rapids, Michigan.

In June 2024, La Dispute revealed in an interview that their next album, No One Was Driving the Car, was set for release in 2025. The album was announced in May 2025, and was released on September 5, 2025, however the album was released in episodic singles in the months prior beginning May 2025, and finishing on September 5th.". Prior to the official announcement fans received a cryptic letter to fans pointing to a secret website containing an ARG with hidden easter eggs that were solved via fans on Discord. Later fans were given an early premiere of the music video for I SHAVED MY HEAD and the first chapter of a documentary covering the creation of NOWDTC.

== Characteristics ==
La Dispute's logo as of October 29, 2010

La Dispute are more than a band; they're veritable artists, concentrating deeply on every aspect of their songs. Musically, their fully developed, experimental melodic-hardcore compositions paint passionately lush soundscapes

— Alternative Press as one of "The 100 Bands You Need to Know" in their April 2010 issue

=== Logo and band name ===
The band has always used a band logo similar to what they do now. La Dispute started to use a redrawn, computer generated version of their logo as of October 2010. The band's name is from the Pierre de Marivaux work from 1744 of the same name. It was a play Dreyer watched while in high school and felt parallels between the work and the music he was writing at the time.

=== Musical style ===
Jordan Dreyer, the band's singer, has commented on the use of tags to describe the band's style, saying: "In general, I think boxing art into categories only serves as a way to exclude people from exploring different variations of the same thing. I think the only real definition between artists exists in their intentions for creating art ..." But despite this La Dispute is described as playing jazz, blues and spoken word influenced post-hardcore which incorporates elements which range through screamo, progressive rock, post-rock and hardcore punk. Well recognized elements of La Dispute's music are incorporating spoken word style passages into intense songs, the use of highly complex lyrics and Jordan Dreyer's versatile control of his voice; able to swap between singing and screaming to correspond and compliment to the emotion of the music and the lyrics. The band's instrumentation is seen as "near-shoegaze guitar drones that complemented the distorted bass" and this couples with their music being like "confessional diary entries; spoken and shouted-word lyrics accompanied by minor-chord harmonies".

The music on their first album Somewhere at the Bottom of the River Between Vega and Altair is seen as blending elements of punk, progressive rock, emo and metalcore.

The band's second album, Wildlife showed a lighter approach to music, compared to both their debut album and mini album, combining elements from both the split albums they wrote with Touché Amoré and Koji respectively. Wildlife was written differently in comparison to the band's previous work, as the lyrics and concept were written before the music. Wildlife's lyrics follow a loosely thematic collection of "short stories" examining the life struggles that shape and define us as individuals. The band drew inspiration from real issues and true stories that they themselves had confronted or heard of in their home town of Grand Rapids. A primary example of this is the track King Park which focuses on the story of an inner city drive-by shooting. The band was noted for combining the energetic dynamics of hardcore punk with the introspective elements of emo and focusing on simpler chord changes.

=== Influences ===
The band is said to be influenced by a broad range of music and as individuals they possess different influences. Post-hardcore bands like Thursday, Refused, At the Drive-In and Glassjaw are just some examples of commonalities amongst the band. Writing a tribute to mewithoutYou upon that band’s retirement, Dreyer wrote that La Dispute “might never have been a band without mewithoutYou” and that he especially was influenced by singer Aaron Weiss’ stage presence. Drummer Brad Vander Lugt has said that the band with each record takes influences from other artists and musicians who are "pushing the envelope and challenging themselves." Vander Lugt personally cites his influences from blues and jazz musicians. Dreyer has stated his lyrical influences are derived from fiction writers rather than from poetry, as he likes to approach writing through stories and different characters. Particularly citing Kurt Vonnegut, Vladimir Nabokov as literary influences, and cites books from Nabokov like Pale Fire and Lolita as some of his favorites. The band credits now defunct Michigan based rock bands Ivan and Coal Black Horse as having a significant influence on La Dispute. Jacob Fricke of The Badger Herald commented on how Black Flag's third album combination of spoken word on its A-side and their typical "hard-and-fast punk" on the B-side acted as an influence on La Dispute's style. Other influences they have cited include Hot Water Music, Modest Mouse, Joanna Newsom and the Mountain Goats.

La Dispute has been said to be a part of a self-proclaimed group of post-hardcore bands called "The New Wave of Post-hardcore", shortened to "the wave", with fellow post-hardcore artists Defeater, Make Do and Mend, Pianos Become the Teeth and Touché Amoré. The term "The Wave" was initially coined as an inside joke between the bands. However, Vander Lugt has commented on how the term has been interpreted with more serious attitude from people, saying: "people just ran with it and some kids took it really seriously, like we were trying to create some kind of collective, which it wasn't at all. But we are really good friends with all of those bands. They're like brothers to us and I think, in that way, it is a collective." A "self-defined movement" which The Guardian described in their article "The A-Z of pop in 2012" as having heavy lyrical emphasis and are reminiscent of the "90s emo scene." "The Wave" is believed to have a 'sphere of influence' that stretches beyond the initial artists and they believe other bands are included, including: All Teeth, Balance and Composure, Comadre, Former Thieves, Into It. Over It., Living With Lions, Seahaven, Tigers Jaw and Title Fight. La Dispute have been noted as being a part of a screamo revival in the 2010s. The immediate legacy of Wildlife has been noted as there has been a "huge influx" of 'melodic post hardcore' bands, particularly in the United States.

=== The Here, Hear "experiment" ===
La Dispute have an ongoing series of EPs called "Here, Hear" which they refer to as "the Here, Hear. experiment". The music on the EPs has been described as primarily spoken word and experimental. When asked about the series Jordan Dreyer said: "For as long as we make music we'll make Here, Hear stuff". The first two Here, Hear EPs both added instrumentation to pre-existing material from poets and novelists such as Tom Robbins' Still Life with Woodpecker, Edgar Allan Poe's poem Annabel Lee, and The Wind in the Willows by Kenneth Grahame. This work was written by different band members, excluding singer and lyricist Jordan Dreyer. The style of each song has been described as the band was writing whatever they felt the moment they heard the lyrics. However, for the third installment in the series the band took Jordan Dreyer's own poetry and added instrumentation which fit the stories. The first installment foreshadowed many of the themes found on their debut album, Somewhere at the Bottom of the River. The band stated that Here, Hear III. would reflect influences on the following album, Wildlife.

Here, Hear IV was initially put on hold by the band for them to concentrate on their third studio album Rooms of the House. Thirteen, the first single from the EP, was put out as a flexible 13-inch record in May 2016 to subscribers of La Dispute's monthly merchandise subscription series, and was later released onto streaming services in July 2016. The rest of the Here, Hear IV EP was released in March 2024.

== Charity ==
The band often works with charitable organizations internationally. This includes Wellhouse and 826 National in Michigan, Teenage Cancer Trust in the UK and Headspace in Australia. Every year on Christmas Day the band makes their entire catalog of music available for free and asks for donations to a charity of their choosing.

== Members ==
Current members

- Jordan Dreyer – lead vocals, auxiliary percussion (2004–present)
- Brad Vander Lugt – drums, backing vocals, percussion, keyboards, programming (2004–present)
- Chad Sterenberg – guitar, backing vocals, keyboards, programming, percussion, lap steel, mandolin, trumpet (2006–present)
- Adam Vass – bass, backing vocals, guitar (2007–present)
- Corey Stroffolino – guitar (2018–present; touring member 2014–2018)

Former members

- Derek Sterenberg – guitar, backing vocals (2004–2006)
- Adam Kool – bass (2004–2007)
- Kevin Whittemore – guitar, backing vocals (2004–2014)

Timeline

== Discography ==
Studio albums

Title	Album details	Peak chart positions	
Title	Album details	US	GER
Somewhere at the Bottom of the River Between Vega and Altair	Released: November 11, 2008; Label: No Sleep	—	—
Wildlife	Released: October 4, 2011; Label: No Sleep	161	—
Rooms of the House	Released: March 18, 2014; Label: Better Living/Staple Records/Big Scary Monsters	45	—
Panorama	Released: March 22, 2019; Label: Epitaph	— (Note: Panorama did not enter the Billboard 200, but did peak at number 5 on the US Independent Albums chart.)	76
No One Was Driving the Car	Released: September 5, 2025; Label: Epitaph	— (Note: No One Was Driving the Car did not enter the Billboard 200, but did peak at number 46 on the Top Current Album Sales chart.)	— (Note: No One Was Driving the Car did not enter the Offizielle Top 100, but did peak at number 13 on the German Rock & Metal Albums chart.)

Soundtracks

Title	Album details
Tiny Dots	Released: 2016; Label: Vagrant Records/Big Scary Monsters

Remix albums

Title	Album details
Panorama Remixed	Released: April 3, 2020; Label: Epitaph

EPs

- Vancouver (2006, Friction Records)
- Untitled 7" (2008, No Sleep)
- Here, Hear. (2008, Forest Life Records)
- Here, Hear II. (2008, No Sleep)
- Winter Tour Holiday CD-R (2008, self-released)
- Here, Hear III. (2009, No Sleep)
- Searching for a Pulse/The Worth of the World (split with Touché Amoré) (2010, No Sleep)
- Never Come Undone (split with Koji) (2011, No Sleep)
- Conversations (2012, self-released)
- Maida Vale Session 2011 (2014, self-released)
- Maida Vale Session 2014 (2014, self-released)
- Studio 4 Live Session (2021, Epitaph)
- La Dispute on Audiotree Live (2022, Audiotree)
- Here, Hear IV (2023, self-released)

Singles

- "Thirteen" (2016, Big Scary Monsters)
- "ROSE QUARTZ / FULTON STREET I" (2018, Epitaph Records)
- "Sixteen" (2024, self-released via Many Hats Distribution)
- "Elster Stares the Desert Down" (2024, self-released via Many Hats Distribution)

DVDs

- Tiny Dots (2015, Better Living/Big Scary Monsters)

Music videos

- "Such Small Hands" (2009)
- "For Mayor in Splitsville" (2014)
- "Woman (Reading)" (2014)
- "ROSE QUARTZ / FULTON STREET I" (2018)
- ""FOOTSTEPS AT THE POND"" (2019)
- "ANXIETY PANORAMA" (2019)
- "I Shaved My Head" (2025)
- "Environmental Catastrophe Film" (2025)
- "Sibling Fistfight at Mom's Fiftieth / The Un-sound" (2025)
- "Saturation Diver" (2025)

Compilation contributions

- "Polly" (Nirvana cover for Whatever Nevermind) (2015, Robotic Empire)
- "Strangelight" (Fugazi cover for Silence Is A Dangerous Sound) (2021, Ripcord Records)
