= Common Sage =

Emo band from New York

- From left: Julian Rosen, Phil DiMarco, Chris Johns

Background information
- Origin: Brooklyn, N.Y., United States
- Genre: Emo
- Years active: 2018–present
- Label: No Sleep Records
- Spinoff of: Davey Crockett
- Members: Julian Rosen; Bryan Louie; Christopher Todd; Steve Keely
- Website: commonsage.bandcamp.com

Common Sage is an American emo band based in Brooklyn, New York. Formed on Staten Island in 2018, the band has released two albums and one EP. Members currently include Julian Rosen on vocals and guitar, Bryan Louie on guitar, Steve Keely bass guitar, and Christopher Todd on drums.

== History ==
After the dissolution of his previous band, Davey Crockett, Julian Rosen recruited two friends of his, Phil DiMarco (formerly of Quantice Never Crashed) and Jenna Snyder, to help him develop and perform some unreleased songs. This reworked material was recorded for the band’s debut album, "Where are you? I’m in Klamath Falls, are you here?" released on cassette by Good Sadie Media in 2018. After this album's release, the trio toured heavily.

The band recorded several songs during 2019 and 2020, and featured these on an EP, Might as Well Eat the Chicken, We Won’t Be Here in the Morning, released by Acrobat Unstable in 2020. This was re-released on cassette by Friend Club Records in February of the following year. This EP showcased a more experimental sound than had been found on the band’s debut, and music videos were produced for three of the EP's songs.

In October 2020, Rosen, DiMarco, and new member Chris Johns traveled to Chicago to record their sophomore album with Neil Strauch, known for producing such bands as Joan of Arc and Slow Mass. This album, It Lives and It Breathes, will be released in September 2021 by No Sleep Records. Its lead single, Think About the Desert, premiered on BrooklynVegan on July 7, 2021, and was released as a 7” with the B-side Only Human on July 9, 2021.

== Discography ==
Date of Release	Title	Label
Albums
2018	"Where are you? I'm in Klamath Falls, are you here?"	Good Sadie Media
2021	It Lives and It Breathes	No Sleep Records
EPs
2020, 2021	Might as Well Eat the Chicken, We Won't Be Here Tomorrow	Acrobat Unstable, Friend Club Records
