= Howell Opera House =

- U.S. Historic district – Contributing property
- Michigan State Historic Site
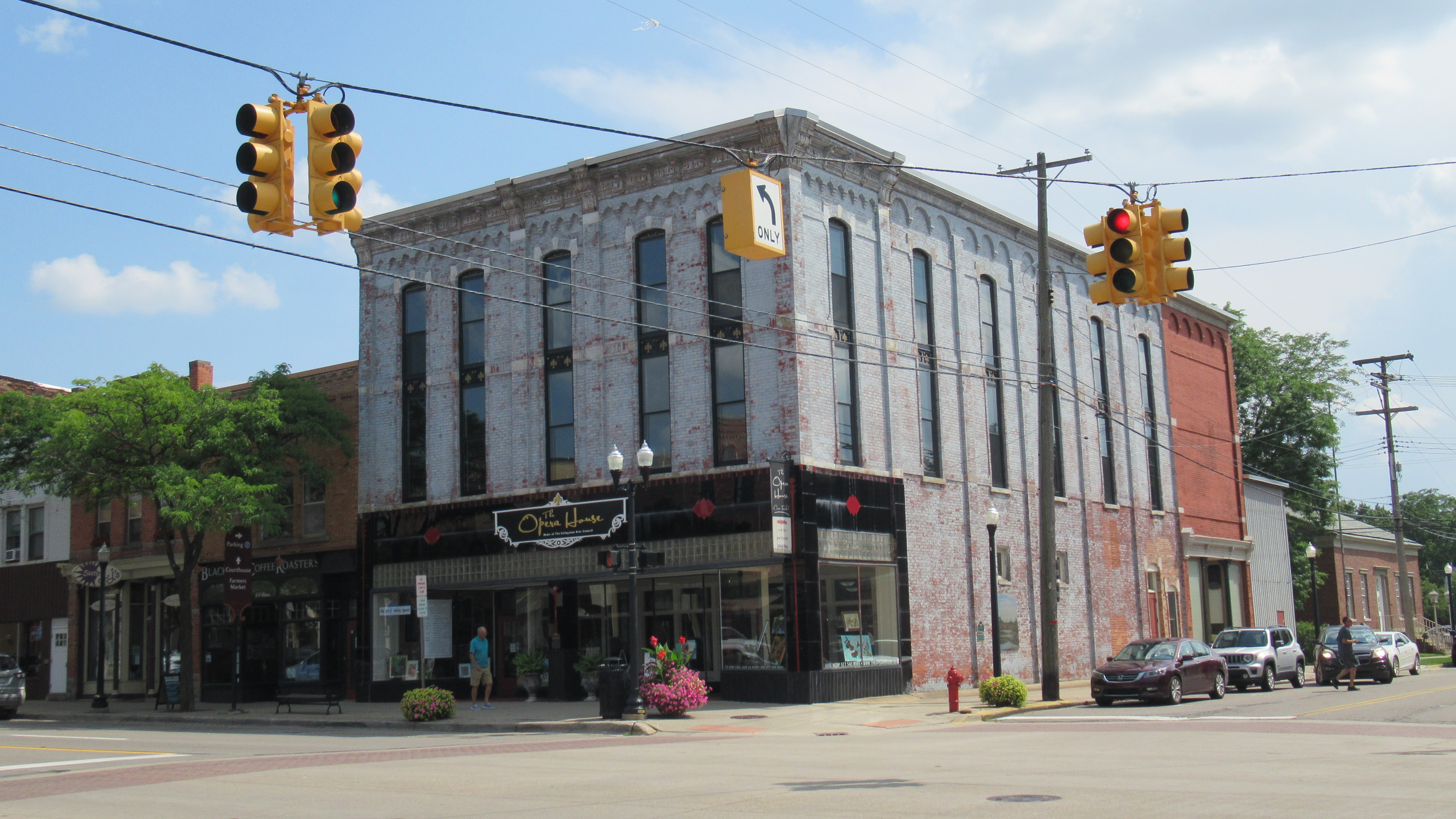
- Howell Opera House in July 2023
- Interactive map of Howell Opera House
- Location: 123 W. Grand River Avenue; Howell, Michigan
- Coordinates: 42°36′26″N 83°55′49″W
- Built: 1880
- Website: https://howelloperahouse.com/
- Part of: Howell Downtown Historic District (ID86003363)
- MSHS No.: P23969

Significant dates
- Designated CP: February 27, 1987
- Designated MSHS: February 11, 1972

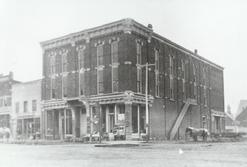
Howell Opera House in 1881

The Howell Opera House is a performance venue located in Howell, Michigan. The site is listed as historic by the Michigan State Historic Preservation Office. It is also listed on the National Historic Register as part of the Howell Downtown Historic District.

== History ==
The Howell Opera House, located at 123 W. Grand River Avenue in Howell, Michigan, is a three-story Victorian-style theater designed by Detroit architect Almon C. Varney. Construction began in 1880 by Hunter and Holmes Contractors, and the building opened to the public on December 30, 1881, at a cost of $10,000. The auditorium originally seated approximately 1,000 people.

In its early decades, the Opera House served as a cultural and civic hub for the community. In addition to performances, it hosted high school commencements, community gatherings, and in 1889 briefly housed the Livingston County Circuit Court. Ownership changed hands several times: the Stair Brothers (E.D. and Orin) assumed control in 1884, and Arthur Garland purchased the property in 1893, operating a tailoring business in part of the building while maintaining the theater.

In 1923, the fire marshal closed the second-floor auditorium, ending its function as a performance venue. For more than 70 years, the structure was primarily used as storage by a local hardware store.

== Renovation ==
The Howell Opera House is owned and operated by the Livingston Arts Council, a 501(c)(3) nonprofit organization. The council provides arts and cultural programming for the community, including concerts, exhibits, and special events, while also overseeing the building’s preservation.

Since acquiring the building, renovations and preservation work have taken place in phases:

2026 (planned) – Launch of a capital campaign with the goal of beginning major renovations of the second-floor theater. 2018 – Replacement of the roof and exterior improvements. 2013 – Installation of new windows on the south side of the building. 2007 – Renovation and reopening of the first floor for public and private events. 2001 – Initial stabilization and interior repairs. 2000 – Livingston Arts Council purchased the Opera House.

The upper auditorium and balcony, closed since 1923, remain unrestored but are open for tours and limited programming. The Livingston Arts Council continues to oversee preservation work and fundraising efforts to support the ongoing restoration of the Howell Opera House.
