= Companions (EP) =

EP by Mixtapes
- Released: November 1, 2011
- Recorded: 2011
- Genre: Pop-punk, indie rock
- Length: 10:00
- Label: Animal Style

Mixtapes chronology
Hope Is for People (2011)	Companions (2011)	How to Throw a Successful Party (2011)

Professional ratings
Review scores
Source	Rating
mindequalsblown.net	4/5 stars

Companions is an EP by Ohio-based pop-punk band Mixtapes. It was released on vinyl with Maps via Animal Style records as Maps & Companions. It features two new songs and two old songs from Maps, "And if We Both Fail?" and "OrangeYellow", as well as "Soups Whatever" from their 2010 release A Short Collection of Short Songs, were re-recorded into full-band tracks.

== Track listing ==
No.	Title	Length
1.	"And if We Both Fail?"	1:55
2.	"6 Quarters"	1:56
3.	"OrangeYellow"	1:57
4.	"Soups Whatever"	2:01
5.	"I Accept That"	2:11

== Personnel ==
- Ryan Rockwell – vocals, guitar, keyboard
- Maura Weaver – vocals, guitar
- Michael Remley – bass
- Boone Haley – drums
