= Somewhere in Trinsic =

Somewhere in Trinsic EP

EP by Mixtapes
- Released: May 8, 2012
- Recorded: 2012
- Genre: Pop punk, indie rock
- Length: 7:59
- Label: Animal Style

Mixtapes chronology
How to Throw a Successful Party (2011)	Somewhere in Trinsic EP (2012)	Even on the Worst Nights (2012)

Professional ratings
Review scores
Source	Rating
absolutepunk	4/5 stars
underthegunreview.net	4.5/5 stars

Somewhere in Trinsic is a 7-inch EP by Ohio-based pop punk band Mixtapes in 2012.

== Track listing ==
No.	Title	Length
1.	"Even on the Worst Nights"	2:56
2.	"All the Mistakes We Make (Are Gonna Lead to All the Important Things We're Gonna Do)"	2:41
3.	"P.E.T.S.O.U.N.D.S."	2:22

== Personnel ==
- Ryan Rockwell – vocals, guitar
- Maura Weaver – vocals, guitar
- Michael Remley – bass
- Boone Haley – drums
