= Even on the Worst Nights =

Studio album by Mixtapes
- Released: June 26, 2012
- Recorded: 2012
- Studio: Moonlight Studios
- Genre: Pop punk, indie rock
- Length: 38:49
- Label: No Sleep Records
- Producer: Eric Tuffendsam

Mixtapes chronology
Somewhere in Trinsic (2012)	Even on the Worst Nights (2012)	Vision Quest (Split) (2012)

Professional ratings
Review scores
Source	Rating
Punknews.org	4/5 stars

Even on the Worst Nights is an album by Ohio-based pop punk band Mixtapes.

== Background ==
As the debut full length album for the band, songs cover a range of familiar topics including love, loneliness, and appreciation for Superchunk.

== Track listing ==
No.	Title	Length
1.	"Seven Mile"	0:53
2.	"Something Better"	2:06
3.	"Hey Ma Pt. 2"	1:32
4.	"Even on the Worst Nights"	2:56
5.	"You Must Not Be From Around Here"	2:38
6.	"You & I"	0:56
7.	"I'm Wearing the Device (Bridge, Water)"	2:51
8.	"I'll Give You a Hint, Yes"	2:36
9.	"Russian House DJ"	2:23
10.	"Anyways"	3:19
11.	"Indian Summer"	2:58
12.	"One for the Ozarks"	1:59
13.	"Just When You Thought it Was Over"	2:51
14.	"Golden Sometimes"	2:20
15.	"Basement Manners"	2:26
16.	"Mt. Hope"	4:05

== Personnel ==
- Ryan Rockwell – vocals, guitar, keyboard
- Maura Weaver – vocals, guitar
- Michael Remley – bass
- Boone Haley – drums
