= Charmer (band) =

American emo band

- Origin: Marquette, Michigan
- Genres: Midwest emo; pop punk
- Years active: 2015–present
- Labels: No Sleep; Counter Intuitive
- Members: David Daignault; Nick Erickson; Neil Berg; Zack Alworden
- Website: charmermi.com

Charmer is an American emo band from Marquette, Michigan, formed in 2015.

== History ==
Their self-titled debut album was released in 2018. Their second album, Ivy, was released in 2020 on No Sleep Records. The band released a split EP in 2021 with Canadian emo band Gulfer. In May 2025, they released their third studio album, Downpour, via Counter Intuitive Records.

== Members ==
Current

- David Daignault – vocals, rhythm guitar
- Nick Erickson – drums
- Neil Berg – lead guitar
- Zack Alworden – bass

== Discography ==
=== Studio albums ===
- Charmer (2018)
- Ivy (2020)
- Downpour (2025)

=== EPs ===
- Whateverville (2016)
- Best Worst Birthday Ever (2017)
- Seney Stretch (2023)
