= Quantice Never Crashed =

Screamo band from New York

- Origin: Staten Island, N.Y., United States
- Genres: Screamo
- Years active: 2002–2006, 2007, 2013, 2019, 2020
- Label: The Death Scene
- Website: Quantice Never Crashed

Quantice Never Crashed was a screamo band from Staten Island, New York, that was most active in the mid-2000s. Founding members included Phil on bass, Vinny on guitar, Mikey on drums, Pat on guitar, and Philly on vocals. (Members were only credited by their first names on albums and promotional materials.) Phil DiMarco, the band's bassist, went on to play drums in emo band Common Sage.

== History ==
The band was founded in 2002 under the name Howard Finster, after the late American folk artist. The group self-released their demo in 2004, prior to changing their name to Quantice Never Crashed.

Their self-titled album was released on independent label The Death Scene on October 19, 2004, and the band toured extensively in its support. The album was positively reviewed in Maximumrocknroll, where it was characterized as "[m]etallic hardcore with lots [of] jerky time changes and riffage galore. They play the mix of metal and screamo off each other very well." The review on metal website Teeth of the Divine noted that "for a debut album, this borders on genre defining brilliance with room yet to improve and (literally) grow." The album was also reviewed in Punk Planet. One song from the album, "Lighthouses," was included on AMP Sampler volume 11 in 2004.

A series of lineup changes followed, and in 2006, singer Philly left and the band dissolved. They reunited for a one-off fundraiser show in 2007. In the following years, the band reunited intermittently, playing the Punk Island festival in 2013, and performing with hardcore group Soul Glo in 2020. They will reunite for upcoming Flames Fest 2024 on June 8th at Mother Pugs Saloon on Staten Island.
