= Maps (Mixtapes album) =

Studio album by Mixtapes
- Released: March 26, 2010; November 1, 2011 (Animal Style Records)
- Recorded: 2010
- Genre: Pop punk; indie rock; acoustic
- Length: 18:02
- Label: Death to False Hope Animal Style

Mixtapes chronology
Maps (2010)	Thought About Growing Up (2010)

Animal Style Records cover

Professional ratings
Review scores
Source	Rating
Punknews.org	4.5/5 stars
ultimate-guitar.com	4/5 stars

Maps is the debut release by Ohio- and Detroit-based pop punk band Mixtapes. The album was recorded over one weekend and released for free on Death to False Hope Records. It was later re-released in November 2011 on vinyl via Animal Style Records, featuring the 10 songs from Maps and a newly recorded EP titled Companions. The album was re-titled Maps & Companions.

== Track listing ==
No.	Title	Length
1.	"Sunrise"	1:00
2.	"Maps"	1:40
3.	"Cassettes (Nothing Can Kill the Grimace)"	2:14
4.	"And If We Both Fail?" (acoustic)	2:07
5.	"The Mixtapes Misplaced Missed Takes"	0:44
6.	"Road Apples"	1:38
7.	"Hope Springs Eternal"	2:08
8.	"OrangeYellow" (acoustic)	2:00
9.	"Moonglow"	1:11
10.	"Sunsets"	3:20

== Personnel ==
- Ryan Rockwell – vocals, guitar, keyboard, bass
- Maura Weaver – vocals, guitar

=== Other musicians ===
- Tim Rengers from Fireworks – drums
