= The Felix Culpa =

American band

the Felix Culpa
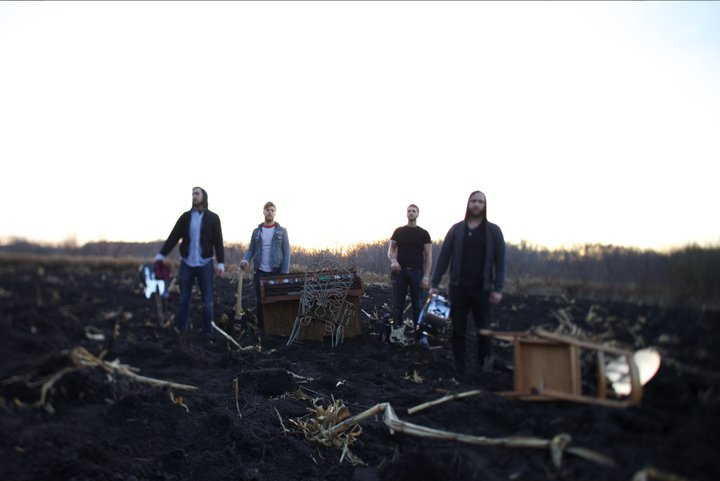
- Press Photo, November, 2010

Background information
- Origin: Beloit, Wisconsin and Rockford, Illinois, USA
- Genres: Indie rock Post-hardcore; Progressive rock Experimental rock
- Years active: 2003–2011, 2014-present
- Label: No Sleep Records
- Members: Marky Hladish; Joel Coan; Tristan Hammond; Dustin Currier
- Past members: Jacob Clark; Justin Uppenkamp; Timothy Wisniewski
- Website: theFelixCulpa.com

The Felix Culpa was a four-piece band from Rockford, Illinois on the Illinois/Wisconsin border. Best described as a Progressive Indie band with post-hardcore elements, they had released two full-length albums ("Commitment" and "Sever Your Roots"), an EP/DVD combo ("Thought Control"), a digital EP ("SoSo Remission") and were signed to No Sleep Records. The band has since broken up and they played their last show on December 9, 2011, though later staging a live reunion in 2014.

== History ==
=== Formation ===
The name "The Felix Culpa" loosely translates to "the fortunate fault", "the blessed fault", "the fortunate fall", or "the happy mistake", and it refers to Adam and Eve's fall through original sin; it was taken from John Milton's Paradise Lost.

The band originally started life in the spring of 1998 as "twostepsback", formed by Timothy Wisniewski, Mark Hladish, and Joel Coan as teens. They met at a series of youth groups in Walworth and Beloit, Wisconsin. Mark and Timothy were initially drawn to indie/punk music. After a short time playing together and exchanging ideas, the duo later met Joel Coan and formed a band, playing together for almost two years." Timothy was asked to leave the band due to irreconcilable differences. Through a series of line-up changes (including the mutual departure of second vocalist Jacob Clark and bassist Justin Uppenkamp), Mark and Joel eventually added Tristan Hammond as their bassist and backing vocalist in late 2003/early 2004; Tristan had, by this time, formed a friendship with both Mark and Joel due to their bands playing shows together.

=== Ancoro Imparo EP ===
Also called 'The Black EP', this was The Felix Culpa's first recorded release. Featuring 4 songs, the third track, "Numbers", would eventually see re-release on 'Commitment' with an updated recording and mix.

=== Commitment ===
The Felix Culpa's debut full-length release, Commitment (2004, Common Cloud Records), rapidly evolved them into a band with near-national distribution and attention from a rabid fan base.
Commitment's release show took place at Mad Planet (Milwaukee, WI) with Engine Down and These Arms Are Snakes, September 18, 2004.

"If there was some sort of midpoint between dreams and nightmares, this would be the soundtrack."

- PunkNews.org

=== Thoughtcontrol ===
For their second release, The Felix Culpa released THOUGHTCONTROL (2005, Common Cloud Records) - an EP/DVD combo that featured 4 new songs, a video for "A Murderer" (Commitment), a live set at the Knights of Columbus, Arlington Heights, IL, and roughly 2 hours of random tour footage.
The release show for THOUGHTCONTROL was held at the very same Knights of Columbus hall during the later half of 2005.

"The songs on THOUGHTCONTROL have a better sense of melody, dissonance and all-around importance than whatever you're currently listening to."

- Scott Hiesel, Alternative Press #210

=== SoSo Remission EP ===
After a long, quiet period, 2009 held the release of a digital EP called SoSo Remission. The release consisted of two re-worked songs and a previously unheard track and was offered up for free; the band also had a link to donate to their PayPal if you felt so inclined; it was comparable to the model that Radiohead used for the release of their 7th album, In Rainbows. SoSo Remission was intended to tide fans over until a new full-length could be finished.

"This is what indie rock loves. This is what indie rock wants."

- Stephen Carradini, Independent Clauses

=== Sever Your Roots (self-release) ===
On January 23, 2010, The Felix Culpa released their 2nd full-length album, Sever Your Roots, to a crowd of 800 people at the Metro in Chicago, IL. The album was completely self-funded and self-released; the CD was wrapped in packaging cut from a custom die and is now out of print.

The double LP on vinyl, which was released the same day, is available in two colours - clear and black - and is still in print.

Sever Your Roots is being re-released on No Sleep Records in early 2011, which includes a 2nd, bonus disc with 3 previously unreleased songs.

"Sever Your Roots has that "no one is making music like this anymore" impact.
...a bona fide post-hardcore epic... the album runs the gamut in terms of textures.
Above all, there's this overarching aura of importance emanating from just about all of it, commanding your attention and demanding that you take heed... (Sever Your Roots) is an example of near perfect execution."

- AbsolutePunk

== Press ==
The band has been featured in Alternative Press Magazine more than half a dozen times, making appearances in sections such as "100 Bands to Know," and "Top 10 Songs Over 10 Minutes Long." The publication gave Commitment a 4/5 rating and hailed it as a "Post-Hardcore masterpiece" and "one of 2004's most underrated full-lengths," as well as stating that the follow-up EP, Thought Control, had "a better sense of melody, dissonance and all-around importance than whatever you're currently listening to."

The biggest surge of attention from the press for The Felix Culpa has come with the release of 2010's Sever Your Roots, however. The album has been making its way into numerous end-of-year lists 1 2 3, as well as receiving critical praise from a plethora of music magazines and blogs.

== Discography ==
=== Albums ===
Year	Title	Label
2004	Commitment	Common Cloud Records
2010	Sever Your Roots	self-released

=== EPs ===
Year	Title	Label
2002	Ancoro Imparo	self-released
2005	Thought Control	Common Cloud Records
2009	SoSo Remission EP	digital-only

=== Tribute albums ===
Year	Title	Label
2011	Songs of Farewell and Departure: A Tribute To HUM	Pop Up Records

== Music videos ==
- "A Murderer" from Commitment
- "Our Holy Ghosts" from Sever Your Roots
