= Somewhere at the Bottom of the River Between Vega and Altair =

Studio album by La Dispute
- Released: November 11, 2008
- Studios: StudiOtte, Grand Rapids
- Genres: Post-hardcore, emo, screamo, spoken word
- Length: 51:38
- Label: No Sleep
- Producer: La Dispute

La Dispute chronology
Here, Hear II. (2008)	Somewhere at the Bottom of the River Between Vega and Altair (2008)	Here, Hear III. (2009)

Singles from Somewhere at the Bottom of the River Between Vega and Altair
- 1. "Said the King to the River" Released: October 10, 2008; 2. "New Storms for Older Lovers" Released: October 20, 2008; 3. "Such Small Hands" Released: July 5, 2009

Re-release album art

Somewhere at the Bottom of the River Between Vega and Altair is the debut studio album by American post-hardcore band La Dispute. Supported by three release shows, it was released on November 11, 2008, alongside Here, Hear II. through No Sleep Records on both CD and vinyl. The album's title is derived from a Chinese folktale, which the album's lyrics loosely follow. The album received positive reviews by notable critics, and it remains as a legacy in the post-hardcore scene.

== Recording ==
La Dispute had spent the year prior to the release of the album writing and recording. They recorded the album in Grand Rapids at StudiOtte with Joel and Troy Otte and had finished the recording by July 2008.

== Themes and styles ==
The album evades categorization, containing elements of post-hardcore, screamo, metalcore, post-rock, progressive rock and emo. The album's style is characterised by different features, including dub-influenced bass drums and versatile vocals from Jordan Dreyer, who changes frequently, ranging from shouted hardcore punk styled vocals and screams, to spoken word portions and intentional use of off-key singing. Lyrically, the album features many themes of emotional anguish and is considered ultra-emotional; its emotions range though pain, rage, and anger and deals with loss considerably. The album recounts the Chinese folk tale of The Cowherd and the Weaver Girl, a story of how a prince and a princess are separated after marriage by a river which they are not allowed to cross. Prior to the release of this album, the story was told on the fourth track from La Dispute's second EP, Here, Hear. However, when vocalist Jordan Dreyer has been asked in interviews about the lyrical concept of the album, he has stated that although it does contain thematic constants it does not actually tell a story and is more autobiographical and the folk tale was used as more of a "jumping-off point" for similar personal struggles. The real-life connotations of the record's lyrics are that of two divorces of people related to Dreyer.

The first song on the album, "Such Small Hands", is a spoken word track which builds "to seemingly uncontrollable levels". Drummer Brad Vander Lugt commented on its surprising popularity, saying: “We cannot figure it out! It’s just an intro to the record, I have no idea why people have clung to it so much... It’s funny, we don’t even count it as a song!” "Bury Your Flame" is seen as "a perfect fusion of blues, post-rock and hardcore".

== Release ==
"Said the King to the River" was posted on the band's Myspace on October 9, 2008. The album was made available for streaming in November 2008, and released a day later through No Sleep records, a record label to which La Dispute had only signed a few months prior. To promote the release of the album, the band played three release shows in their home state of Michigan: November 8 at Skelletones, November 14 at the UAW Retirees Hall in Traverse City, and November 22 at the Howell Opera House in Howell. They played a handful of Midwestern shows to close out 2008. They opened 2009 with a two-month US tour. In July 2009, they toured Australia with To the North as the main support act, while various local bands opened each date. In September and October 2009, the band supported Thursday on their headlining US tour. In December 2009 and January 2010, the band went on a US tour with Native. In April and May 2010, they supported Alexisonfire on their cross-country US tour, and then appeared at Bled Fest.

== Reception ==
Professional ratings
Review scores
Source	Rating
Absolute Punk	(91%)
Can You See the Sunset?	(favorable)
MusicEmissions	4/5 stars
Pruegrainaudio	(8.4/10)
Strangeglue	8/10 stars
Ultimate Guitar	(9.7/10)

The album is a popular release of No Sleep Records as it has received ten pressings on vinyl for a total of 8,280 copies. All eight pressings combined is a total of 6400 sales of the album on vinyl alone.

In 2012, British publication Rock Sound added La Dispute's debut album into their 101 Modern Classics, placed at number 53. They considered the album more of a classic than Korn's Follow The Leader and Rage Against the Machine's Battle of Los Angeles. Stating that "their debut album was an emotional trip through scratchy punk, dissonant hardcore and broken poetry; it's [sic] strength, though, lies in its uniqueness." "The Last Lost Continent" appeared on a best-of emo songs list by Vulture.

== 10th anniversary reissue ==
In August 2018, the band announced that they would be releasing an updated version of Somewhere at the Bottom of the River Between Vega and Altair, featuring re-amped versions of the original guitar and bass tracks (engineered by Rooms of the House co-producer Will Yip). It was mixed by Dave Schiffman and mastered by Emily Lazar. The reissued album was released on November 9, 2018. New album art — featuring the same neutral base color but replacing the boat with a smaller bird defaced by a red squiggle alongside the album title and band name in sans-serif typefaces, two small constellations and a smaller rowboat all on a muddied background — was created by artist Corey Purvis.

== Track listing ==
No.	Title	Length
1.	"Such Small Hands"	1:35
2.	"Said the King to the River"	4:01
3.	"New Storms for Older Lovers"	4:59
4.	"Damaged Goods"	2:55
5.	"Fall Down, Never Get Back Up Again"	2:45
6.	"Bury Your Flame"	4:35
7.	"Last Blues for Bloody Knuckles"	5:00
8.	"The Castle Builders"	2:46
9.	"Andria"	4:20
10.	"Then Again, Maybe You Were Right"	1:36
11.	"Sad Prayers for Guilty Bodies"	3:46
12.	"The Last Lost Continent"	12:02
13.	"Nobody, Not Even the Rain"	1:10
Total length:		51:38

== Personnel ==
La Dispute

- Jordan Dreyer – lead vocals, lyrics, percussion
- Brad Vander Lugt – drums, keyboards, percussion, backing vocals
- Chad Sterenberg – guitar, backing vocals
- Kevin Whittemore – guitar, backing vocals, lap steel guitar (track 9)
- Adam Vass – bass guitar, additional guitars, backing vocals

Additional personnel

- Adam Kool – additional composition (tracks 1, 2, 6, 13); additional guitar (tracks 1, 13)
- Kim Rosen – mastering
- Joel Otte – mixing, audio engineer
- Troy Otte – audio engineer, backing vocalist
- Nick Vander Lugt – backing vocalist
- Nick Satinover – artwork illustrator
