= Here, Hear II. =

EP by La Dispute
- Released: November 11, 2008
- Recorded: Caledonia, Michigan, August 24–28, 2008
- Genre: Spoken word, experimental
- Length: 10:26
- Label: No Sleep Records
- Producer: La Dispute

La Dispute chronology
Here, Hear. (2008)	Here, Hear II. (2008)	Somewhere at the Bottom of the River Between Vega and Altair (2008)

Professional ratings
Review scores
Source	Rating
Asice	3.5/5 stars

Here, Hear II. is a 7" EP by La Dispute and the second instalment in the Here, Hear series, it was released on November 11, 2008 along with their debut full length, Somewhere At the Bottom of the River Between Vega and Altair through No Sleep Records. The EP was limited to 300 copies, and in 3 different cover variations with 100 copies per cover variant. Like the first release in the series, the EP features spoken-word track reciting pre-existing literature written by other authors. Five consists of an amalgamation of three different poems by Charles Bukowski, Six has lyrics taken from The Myth of Sisyphus by Albert Camus, Seven features the first chapter from the children's novel The Wind in the Willows, and Eight has its lyrics taken from the afterword of the graphic novel series Midnight Nation by J. Michael Straczynski.

== Track listing ==
No.	Title	Length
1.	"Five"	2:38
2.	"Six"	2:18
3.	"Seven"	2:26
4.	"Eight"	3:04
Total length:		10:26

== Personnel ==
La Dispute

- Jordan Dreyer - lead vocals
- Brad Vander Lugt - drums, keyboards, percussion
- Chad Sterenberg - guitar
- Kevin Whittemore - guitar
- Adam Vass - bass, additional guitars
