= Mixtapes (band) =

American pop punk band

- Also known as: Mixtapes Ohio
- Origin: Cincinnati, Ohio
- Genres: Pop-punk, indie rock, skate punk
- Years active: 2009–2014, 2017
- Labels: Death to False Hope Records; Animal Style Records; No Sleep
- Past members: Ryan Rockwell; Maura Weaver; Boone Haley; Paul "Golden Boy" Kupper; Michael Remley
- Website: www.mixtapesohio.com

Mixtapes was an American pop-punk band from Cincinnati, Ohio, signed to No Sleep Records. The band formed in 2009, and released multiple studio albums before entering an indefinite hiatus in 2014. In 2019, Consequence ranked Mixtapes at number 89 on its list The 100 Best Pop Punk Bands.

== History ==
Mixtapes was formed in 2009, by friends Ryan Rockwell and Maura Weaver. Sharing lead vocals and guitar duties, the pair hired drummer Tim Rengers to record the band's debut album, Maps, which was released via Death to False Hope Records in March 2010. The following year, they re-released their first album as Maps & Companions on vinyl under Animal Style Records, which featured 5 new songs from a newly recorded EP titled Companions (EP). The band was quickly expanded with bass guitarist Michael Remley and permanent drummer Boone Haley.

In 2012, the band signed to No Sleep Records and released their second album, titled Even on the Worst Nights.

On January 6, 2013, Michael Remley announced he would play his last show on February 5, and was soon replaced by Paul Kupper. Later that same year in May, they embarked on a tour with Masked Intruder in support of the album, called the "Let's Talk Industry Tour". In the summer of 2013, Mixtapes played on the annual Warped Tour. The band released their third album in 2013, titled Ordinary Silence. After the release, they went on a fall tour with Real Friends, Forever Came Calling, and Pentimento.

In the spring of 2014, Mixtapes supported Bayside on their spring headlining tour. In the summer of 2014, the band once again partook in the Warped Tour. Mixtapes played their final two sets at The Fest 13 on Oct 31 and November 1, 2014, before going on hiatus. Drummer Haley went on to play in the hardcore band On Bodies.

The band performed a one-night-only reunion show on December 17, 2017, at Chain Reaction in Anaheim, California, for the ten-year anniversary party of Animal Style Records.

== Band members ==
=== Final lineup ===
- Ryan Rockwell – vocals, guitar (2009–2014, 2017)
- Maura Weaver – vocals, guitar (2009–2014, 2017)
- Boone Haley – drums (2010–2014, 2017)
- Paul "Golden Boy" Kupper – bass (2013–2014, 2017)

=== Former members ===
- Michael Remley – bass (2010–2013)

== Discography ==
Albums

- Maps (2010)
- Even on the Worst Nights (2012)
- Ordinary Silence (2013)

EPs

- Thought About Growing Up (2010)
- A Short Collection of Short Songs (2010)
- Castle Songs (2011)
- Hope Is for People (2011)
- Companions (2011)
- How to Throw a Successful Party (2011)
- Somewhere in Trinsic (2012)

Splits

- Mixtapes/Direct Hit! (2010)
- Vision Quest (Mixtapes/Broadway Calls, 2012)
- Mixtapes/Jabber (2015)

Compilation release

- These Are Us: Unreleased Songs, B Sides, Rarities, Covers, Splits, and Everything Else (2015)

Other songs

- 2010 – "Broken Hearted Christmas" on the compilation CD It's a Mess X-mas! (Messy Life Records)
- 2012 – "Right Where to Find Me" on the compilation CD The Thing That Ate Larry Livermore (Adeline Records)
- 2012 – "Coffee Party" on the compilation CD No Sleep Records Summer 2012 (No Sleep Records)
- 2015 – "A Million Bad Bands" on These Are Us compilation (Paper and Plastic)
- 2015 – "Grenadine" on These Are Us compilation (Paper and Plastic)
- 2015 – "Sleepless in St. Paul (Acoustic/Redux) (Rivethead Cover)" on These Are Us compilation (Paper and Plastic)
- 2015 – "My, You Look Ravishing Tonight! (Kleenex Girl Wonder Cover)" on These Are Us compilation (Paper and Plastic)
- 2015 – "Road Maps, Ice Caps, Death Traps" on These Are Us compilation (Paper and Plastic)

Music videos

- 2010 – "Sprinkles"
- 2010 – "Werewolf Shame (Direct Hit! Cover)"
- 2011 – "Hope is For People"
- 2012 – "I Accept That"
- 2012 – "Anyways"
- 2013 – "Bad Parts"
