= Hope Is for People =

Thought About Growing Up

EP by Mixtapes
- Released: May 3, 2011
- Recorded: 2011
- Genre: Pop-punk, indie rock
- Length: 9:11
- Label: Animal Style Records

Mixtapes chronology
Castle Songs (2011)	Thought About Growing Up (2011)	Companions (2011)

Professional ratings
Review scores
Source	Rating
Punknews.org	4/5 stars

Hope is for People is a 7-inch EP by Ohio-based pop-punk band Mixtapes. It is their second release on Animal Style Records.

== Track listing ==
No.	Title	Length
1.	"Taking a Year Off"	1:32
2.	"Hope Is for People"	2:56
3.	"You'd Better Bring More Dudes"	1:34
4.	"Where I Live"	1:46
5.	"The New Ride the Lightning"	1:23

== Personnel ==
- Ryan Rockwell – vocals, guitar
- Maura Weaver – vocals, guitar
- Michael Remley – bass
- Boone Haley – drums
