= Howell Downtown Historic District =

- U.S. National Register of Historic Places
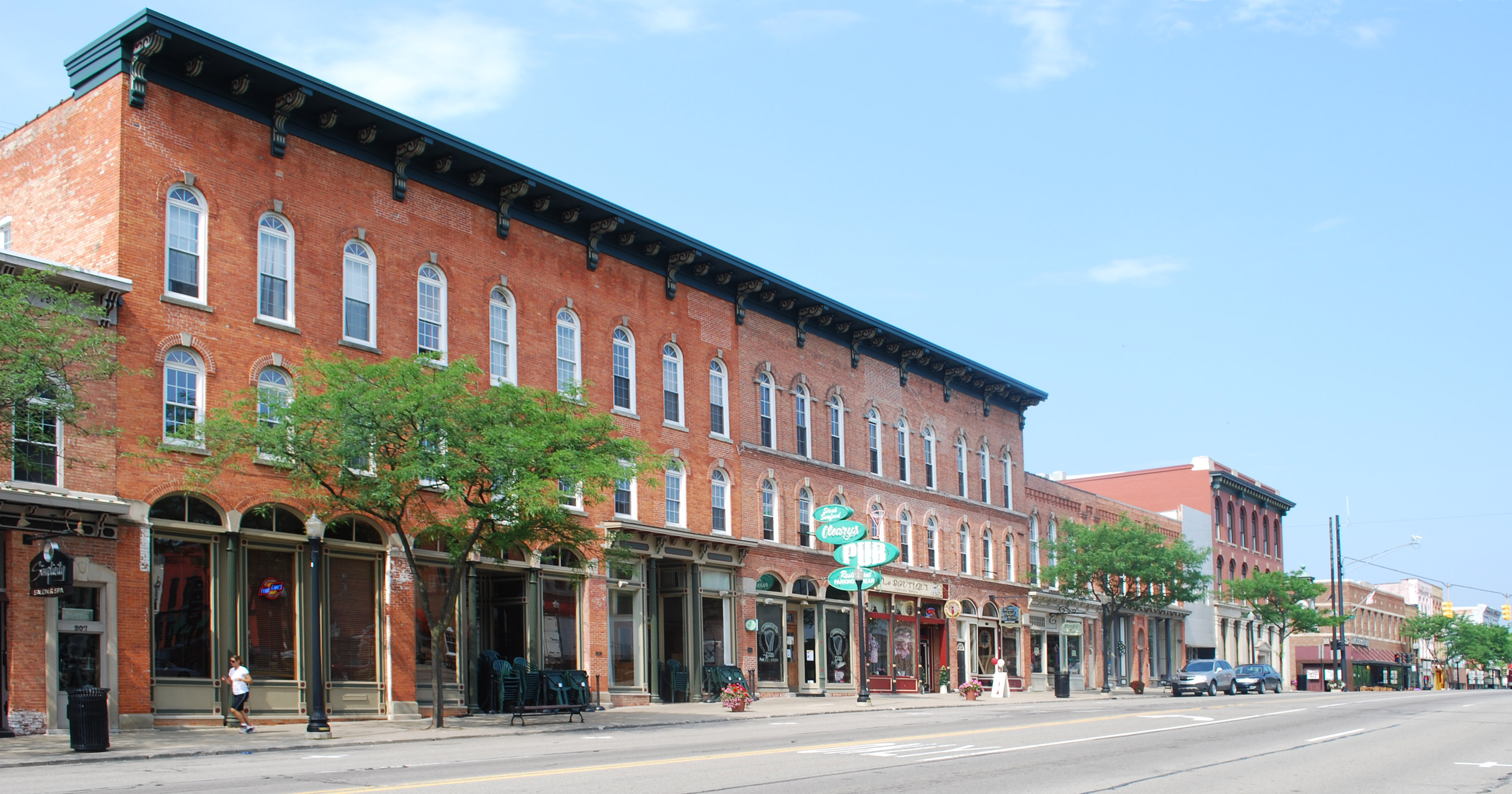
- Grand River at State, Looking west

- Location within Michigan Location within the United States
- Interactive map showing the location of Howell Downtown Historic District
- Location: Roughly bounded by Clinton, Barnard, Sibley, and Chestnut Sts., Howell, Michigan
- Area: 17 acres (6.9 ha)
- Architect: Almon Clother Varney, Sidney Badgley, et al.
- Architectural style: Mixed (more Than 2 Styles From Different Periods), Italianate
- NRHP reference No.: 86003363
- Added to NRHP: February 27, 1987

The Howell Downtown Historic District is a primarily commercial historic district located along five blocks of Grand River Avenue in the center of Howell, Michigan. It was listed on the National Register of Historic Places in 1987.

== History ==
Howell was first settled in 1833-34. The village was platted in 1835, and in 1836 became the county seat for Livingston County. The stretch along Grand River Avenue that is encompassed by this historic district has been the center of commercial activity since the 1830s. The buildings that are currently located in the district date from the 1870s. Disastrous fires in the district in 1887 and 1892 destroyed some of the earlier buildings, but replacement infill structures were quickly constructed.

== Description ==
The Howell Downtown Historic District is located in the central business district of the city, and incorporates parts of nine city blocks as well as the courthouse square. The district encompasses about fourteen acres, and includes sixty building, of which forty-six contribute to the historic significance of the district. These buildings date from 1865 to the mid-twentieth century, and include Italianate, Gothic Revival, High Victorian, Richardsonian Romanesque, Neoclassical, Tudor Revival, Colonial Revival, and Art Deco architectural styles. The area is primarily commercial buildings of one and two stories in height, but also includes landmark public buildings such as the Livingston County Courthouse (separately listed on the National Register of Historic Places), the Carnegie Library, and the First Presbyterian Church.

Significant buildings include:

- First Presbyterian Church (323 West Grand River Avenue): The First Presbyterian Church, located at the west end of the district, was designed by Sidney Badgley in 1915 in a modified English Gothic style. It is constructed of gray coursed ashlar, and has a large square crenelated tower with pinnacles and an arched belfrey. Windows contain Gothic tracery. A contemporary wing adjoins the church.
- Carnegie Library (314 West Grand River Avenue) The Carnegie Library is located across the street from the Presbyterian Church, and is located on a large lot in a park-like setting. It is a Neoclassical building, constructed in 1903-06 of local fieldstone and granite shaded gray, deep rose and white. A round cupola is atop the roof.
- McPherson Oil Company (223 West Grand River): The former McPherson Oil Company has a large exterior brick chimney and Tudor Revival elements.
- Opera House (123 West Grand River Avenue): The former Opera House is a three-story red brick building constructed in 1881 and designed by architect Almon C. Varney. The first floor contains storefronts, while the upper two floors contained a theater. In 1938, a shiny black carrara glass storefront was installed.
- McPherson Store (108-110 West Grand River): The former McPherson Store is a two-story High Victorian bichromatic brick building, decorated with distinctive polychrome tiles. It has a heavy cornice with small towers, and segmental arched, double sash windows with hood moldings containing a floral motif on the second floor. The building was constructed for blacksmith and merchant William P. McPherson, likely in the 1880s.
- Jewett Block (101 East Grand River): Now the First National Bank, the former Jewett Block is a three-story Italianate brick building with arched windows and a heavy bracketed cornice. It was built in 1872-73 for drygoods merchants Jewett, Goodnow and Kickey. The First State Savings Bank occupied part of the building beginning in 1919, and in 1946 it was purchased by the First National Bank.
- Livingston County Courthouse (200 East Grand River Avenue): The Livingston County Courthouse is a three-story Richardsonian Romanesque building, designed by architect Albert E. French in 1889. It is set back from the street on a parcel of land encompassing an entire block. It has a distinctive clock tower the can be seen from a great distance, seet atop a steeply pitched hip roof with gabled dormers.
- Howell Theater (313-319 East Grand River Avenue): The Howell Theater is a two-story yellow brick building constructed in 1912 as the Temple Theater. The Art Deco marquee and entrance was added later.

== Gallery ==
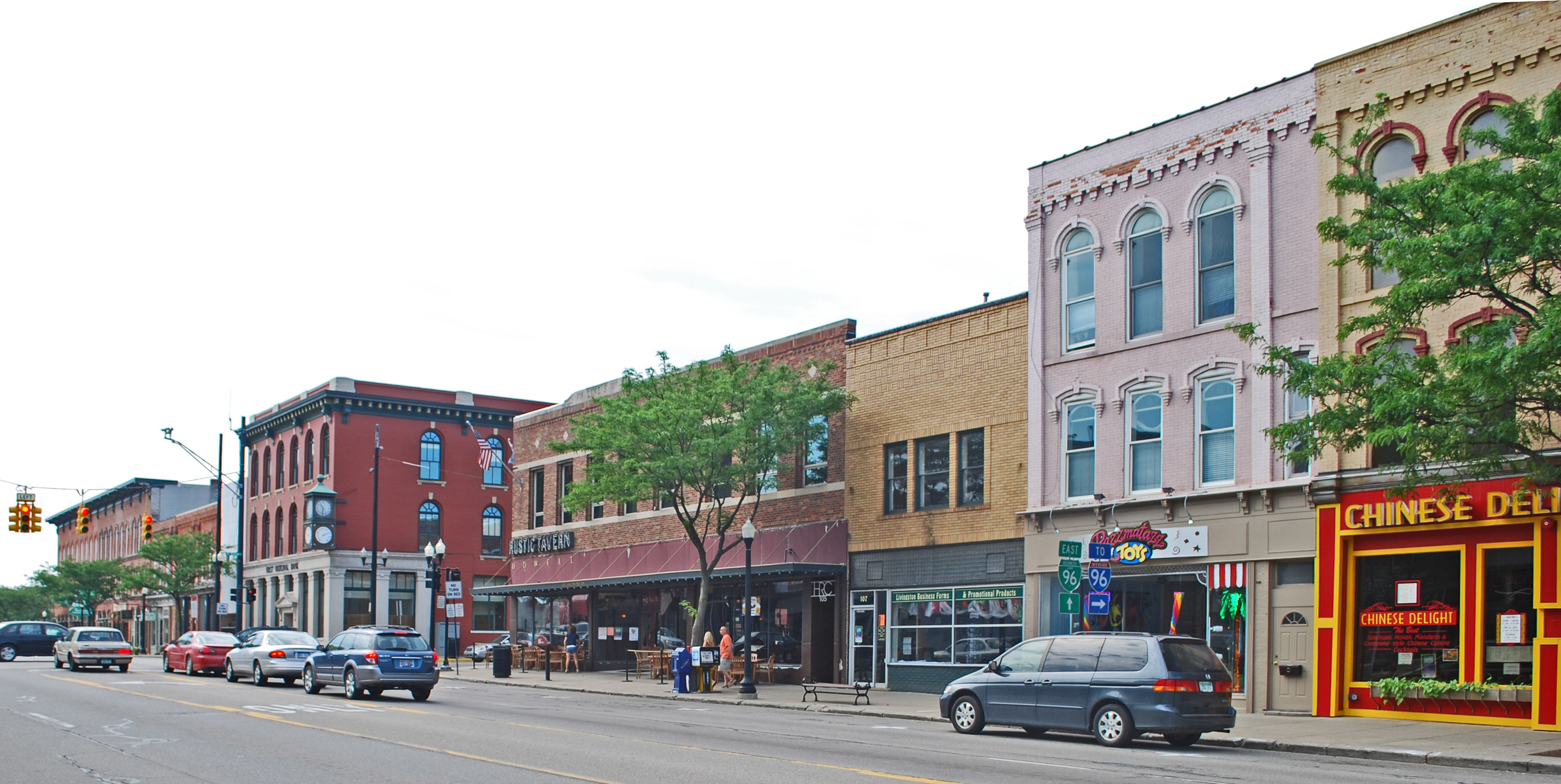
Grand River at Michigan, looking east

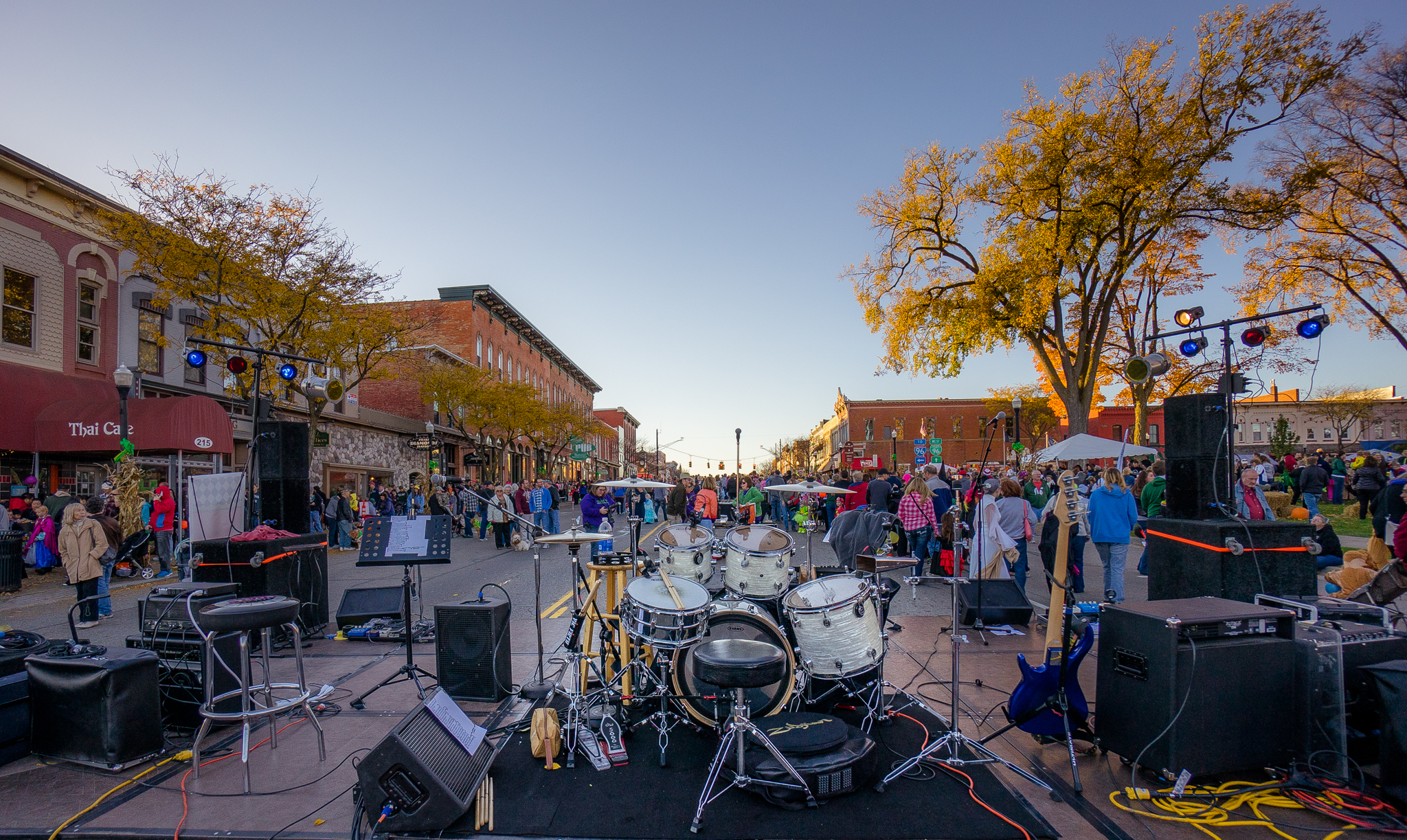
Street fair, looking west

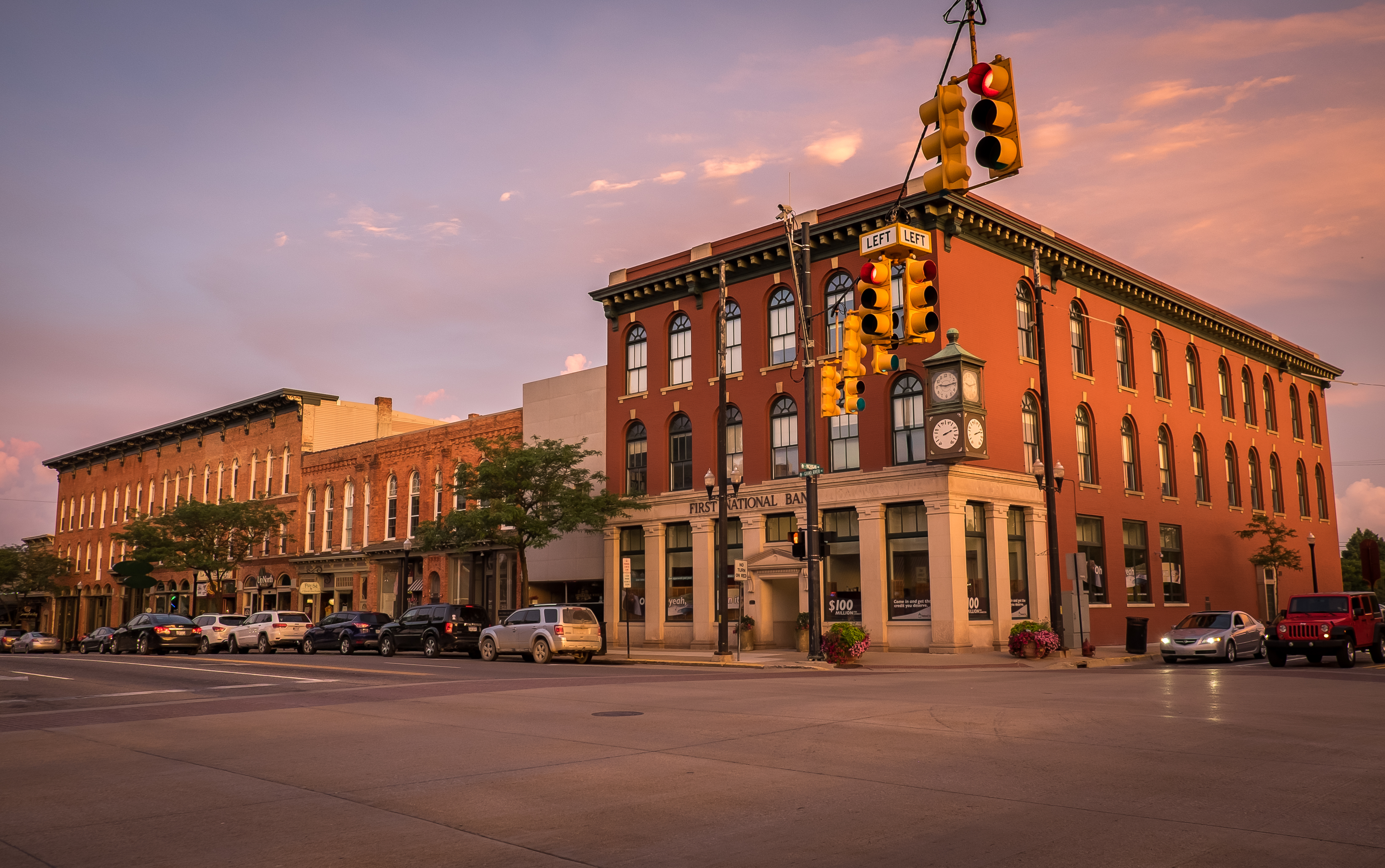
Grand River between Michigan and State, looking east

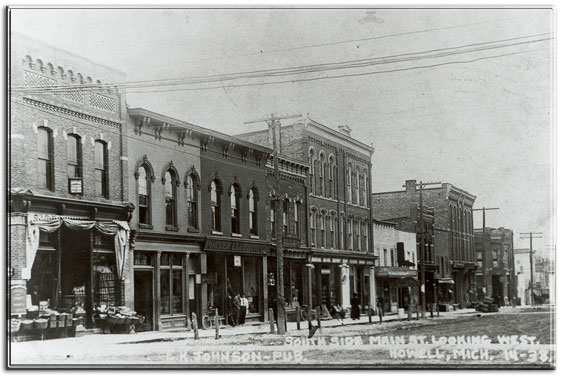
Downtown c. 1900

== See also ==
- National Register of Historic Places listings in Livingston County, Michigan
