= Panorama (La Dispute album) =

Studio album by La Dispute
- Released: March 22, 2019
- Studio: Studio 4 (Conshohocken)
- Genres: Emo; post-hardcore; spoken word
- Length: 41:53
- Label: Epitaph
- Producers: La Dispute; Will Yip

La Dispute chronology
Tiny Dots (2016)	Panorama (2019)	Here, Hear IV (2024)

Singles from Panorama
- 1. "Rose Quartz / Fulton Street I" Released: December 4, 2018; 2. "Footsteps at the Pond" Released: January 9, 2019

Panorama Remixed

Panorama is the fourth studio album released by the American post-hardcore band La Dispute. It was released on March 22, 2019, through Epitaph Records.

== History ==
The album was inspired by the drive that vocalist Jordan Dreyer and his partner would take from their home in the East Hills neighborhood of Grand Rapids, Michigan to Lowell, where the latter grew up.

== Critical reception ==
Professional ratings
Aggregate scores
Source	Rating
Metacritic	82/100
Review scores
Source	Rating
DIY	3/5 stars
Kerrang!	4/5 stars
Pitchfork	7.6/10
The Skinny	4/5 stars
Sputnikmusic	4.5/5 stars
Wall of Sound	5/5 stars

Panorama received universal acclaim from music critics. Wall of Sound gave the album a perfect score of 5/5 stating that "La Dispute have overcome their own shadow, creating an unflinching masterpiece, a new milestone in an uncompromising career of beauty and misery".

== Track listing ==
All lyrics are written by Jordan Dreyer; all music is composed by Dreyer, Chad Morgan-Sterenberg, Corey Stroffolino, Brad Vander Lugt, and Adam Vass.

Panorama track listing
No.	Title	Length
1.	"Rose Quartz"	1:05
2.	"Fulton Street I"	4:41
3.	"Fulton Street II"	4:59
4.	"Rhodonite and Grief"	3:37
5.	"Anxiety Panorama"	3:51
6.	"In Northern Michigan"	4:04
7.	"View from Our Bedroom Window"	4:05
8.	"Footsteps at the Pond"	3:23
9.	"There You Are (Hiding Place)"	4:53
10.	"You Ascendant"	7:15
Total length:		41:53

=== Note ===
- All track titles are stylized in all capital letters.

== Personnel ==
Credits adapted from the album's liner notes.

=== La Dispute ===
- Jordan Dreyer – vocals, production
- Chad Morgan-Sterenberg – guitars, trumpet, piano, effects, production
- Corey Stroffolino – guitar, production
- Adam Vass – bass guitar, production, art direction, layout
- Brad Vander Lugt – drums, percussion, synthesizers, keyboards, programming, production

=== Additional personnel ===
- Will Yip – production, engineering, mixing
- Vince Ratti – mixing
- Emily Lazar – mastering
- Chris Allgood – mastering assistance
- Victor Mosquera – album artwork
- Nick Steinhardt – "Panorama" font design

== Charts ==
Chart (2019)	Peak position
German Albums (Offizielle Top 100)	76
US Independent Albums (Billboard)	5
US Top Alternative Albums (Billboard)	10
US Indie Store Album Sales (Billboard)	23
US Vinyl Albums (Billboard)	5

== Panorama Remixed ==
On December 25, 2019, a remix album, featuring remixes by other artists, was released via BandCamp. All proceeds from the first day of downloads were donated to the Vera Institute of Justice. Panorama Remixed was released on other platforms on April 3, 2020.

=== Track listing ===
No.	Title	Length
1.	"Rose Quartz" (NNAMDÏ remix)	2:16
2.	"Fulton Street I" (Hether Fortune remix)	5:13
3.	"Fulton Street II" (Wreck and Reference remix)	4:49
4.	"Rhodonite and Grief" (Kitty remix)	2:59
5.	"Anxiety Panorama" (Cremation Lily remix)	2:48
6.	"In Northern Michigan" (David Allred remix)	4:06
7.	"View from Our Bedroom Window" (E.M. Hudson remix)	3:54
8.	"Footsteps at the Pond" (Zeal & Ardor remix)	4:28
9.	"There You Are (Hiding Place)" (Majetic remix)	4:22
10.	"You Ascendant" (Peter Broderick remix)	3:07
Total length:		38:02

Notes

- All track titles are stylized in all capital letters, except inside the parentheses where the remix producers are denoted.
