= Rooms of the House =

Studio album by La Dispute
- Released: March 18, 2014
- Recorded: At Studio 4 in Conshohocken, PA
- Genres: Post-hardcore, emo, indie rock, spoken word
- Length: 41:49
- Labels: Better Living; Staple
- Producers: Will Yip, La Dispute

La Dispute chronology
| Wildlife (2011) | Rooms of the House (2014) | Tiny Dots (2016) |

Singles from Rooms of the House
- 1. "Stay Happy There" Released: January 14, 2014; 2. "For Mayor in Splitsville" Released: February 13, 2014

Professional ratings
Aggregate scores
| Source | Rating |
|---|---|
| Metacritic | 88/100 |
Review scores
| Source | Rating |
| Alternative Press | 5/5 stars |
| DIY | 3/5 stars |
| Exclaim! | 9/10 |
| Kerrang! | 4/5 stars |
| The Line of Best Fit | 6.5/10 |
| The Music | 5/5 stars |
| NME | 8/10 |
| Paste | 8.5/10 |
| Sputnikmusic | 4.0/5 |
| Tom Hull | B+ |

Rooms of the House is the third studio album by American post-hardcore band La Dispute, released on March 18, 2014 through their own label Better Living.

== History ==
The album was written in a cabin in the Upper Peninsula of Michigan and recorded in Philadelphia, Pennsylvania, with producer Will Yip. The album was released with a 48-page companion book, Yesterday's Home, which was written about the process of making the album and includes all of the lyrics as well. Some of the proceeds from the record went to benefitting causes advancing and encouraging youth involvement in the arts and music, such as all-ages spaces, creative workshops, programming, and education. A tour was announced for Spring 2014 with Pianos Become the Teeth and Mansions. A national tour started on March 14, 2014 and ended on April 14, 2014 and an international tour started on April 27, 2014 and ended on May 22, 2014.

This release is the first without longtime supporters No Sleep Records, instead being released on their own label Better Living with help from Staple Records.

The album was included at number 42 on Rock Sound's "Top 50 Albums of the Year" list.

Following the album’s 10th anniversary, a previously unreleased B-side, Elster Stares the Desert Down, was released on May 30, 2024.

== Track listing ==
| No. | Title | Length |
|---|---|---|
| 1. | "Hudsonville, MI 1956" | 3:59 |
| 2. | "First Reactions After Falling Through the Ice" | 2:38 |
| 3. | "Woman (in mirror)" | 4:25 |
| 4. | "Scenes from Highways 1981-2009" | 3:50 |
| 5. | "For Mayor in Splitsville" | 3:35 |
| 6. | "35" | 4:34 |
| 7. | "Stay Happy There" | 3:27 |
| 8. | "The Child We Lost 1963" | 4:22 |
| 9. | "Woman (reading)" | 3:31 |
| 10. | "Extraordinary Dinner Party" | 3:19 |
| 11. | "Objects in Space" | 4:09 |
| Total length: | | 41:49 |

== Personnel ==
La Dispute

- Jordan Dreyer – lead vocals, lyrics, percussion
- Chad Sterenberg – guitar, synthesizer, percussion, backing vocals
- Adam Vass – bass guitar, additional guitars, artwork, layout, backing vocals
- Kevin Whittemore – guitar
- Brad Vander Lugt – drums, percussion, keyboards

Additional personnel

- Will Yip – engineer, mixing, producer
- Amanda Adams – photography
- La Dispute – producer
- Emily Lazar – mastering
- Rich Morales – mastering assistant
- Adam Vass – artwork and layout

== Charts ==
| Chart (2014) | Peak position |
|---|---|
| US Vinyl Albums (Billboard) | 3 |
| US Independent Albums (Billboard) | 8 |
| US Top Alternative Albums (Billboard) | 10 |
| US Top Rock Albums (Billboard) | 11 |
