= Thought About Growing Up =

EP by Mixtapes
- Released: June 1, 2010
- Recorded: 2010
- Genre: Pop punk, indie rock
- Length: 7:20
- Label: Death to False Hopes Records

Mixtapes chronology
Maps (2010)	Thought About Growing Up (2010)	A Short Collection of Short Songs (2010)

Professional ratings
Review scores
Source	Rating
Punknews.org	4/5 stars

Thought About Growing Up is an EP by Ohio-based pop punk band Mixtapes.

== Track listing ==
No.	Title	Length
1.	"Recently"	1:05
2.	"Morning Sex and AM Radio"	2:09
3.	"Pop Rocks n' Coke"	1:19
4.	"Sprinkles"	2:50

== Personnel ==
- Ryan Rockwell – vocals, guitar, keyboard
- Maura Weaver – vocals, guitar
- Michael Remley – bass
- Boone Haley – drums
