= Falling Whistles =

Non-profit organization based in California

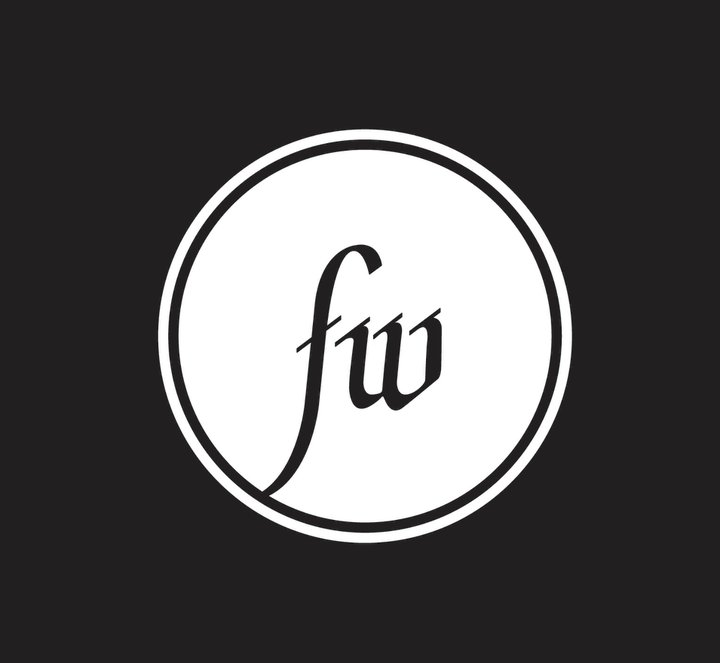
- Founded: 2008
- Founders: Sean Carasso; David E Lewis
- Tax ID no.: 26-3069105
- Location: Los Angeles, California Stockholm, Sweden
- Region served: Democratic Republic of the Congo
- Method: Awareness raising, aid.
- Website: www.fallingwhistles.com

Falling Whistles is non-profit organization campaigning for peace in the Democratic Republic of the Congo. The whistle is a symbol of protest and the organization asks individuals to be whistleblowers for peace. The organization invests the proceeds from the whistle sales in Congolese visionaries, and are building a global coalition for peace.

Falling Whistles sells whistles for $34 to $104 to raise money for education, advocacy, and the rehabilitation of war-affected people in Congo. The organization got its name from a journal written by its founder, sharing his experiences during a trip to eastern Congo in 2008. During that trip, Falling Whistles' founder met a group of five former child soldiers who told him that some children who were too young to carry weapons were sent into battle armed only with whistles. By wearing whistles, the campaign aims to use this weapon as a tool of protest and to raise awareness of the situation in Congo. As of September 2010, $500,000 has been raised.

Falling Whistles partners with Congolese leaders in North and South Kivu, providing them with financial, technical, and logistical support to help them rehabilitate war-affected people in Congo. In 2010, Falling Whistles opened an advocacy office in Washington, DC, and launched a network of community groups, called "Whistler Societies" that gather to learn about the crisis in DRC and take action toward solutions.

In April 2011, Falling Whistles launched a campaign for free and fair elections in Congo, and joined 8 other organizations in seeking the appointment of a U.S. Special Envoy for the Great Lakes Region.

In September 2010, Falling Whistles staff and volunteers started a tour of 30 cities, visiting universities and organisations including Google, MIT and Tufts University.
