= Here, Hear III. =

EP by La Dispute
- Released: December 25, 2009
- Recorded: Grand Rapids, Michigan
- Genre: Spoken word; experimental
- Length: 12:53
- Label: Self-released
- Producer: La Dispute

La Dispute chronology
Somewhere at the Bottom of the River Between Vega and Altair (2008)	Here, Hear III. (2009)	Searching for a Pulse/The Worth of the World (2010)

Professional ratings
Review scores
Source	Rating
sputnikmusic	4/5 stars

Here, Hear III. is an EP by La Dispute, self-released on December 25, 2009. Unlike the previous two EPs in the series, Here, Hear III. was recorded in Brad Vander Lugt's basement.

== Release ==
With the release of this extended play, the first two EPs in the Here, Hear. series, as well as Untitled 7" and a two-track Christmas EP, became available for download on La Dispute's Bandcamp site. All purchases made during the three-week period from December 25, 2009, to January 17, 2010, were donated to the Well House Community Living of Grand Rapids, a non-profit outreach program in Grand Rapids that provides emergency shelter and permanent housing for homeless families. When the period of donation ended, $1,715 had been raised for Well House. All subsequent purchases from Bandcamp go towards covering the recording expenses of the band.

== Track listing ==
No.	Title	Length
1.	"Nine"	2:40
2.	"Ten"	4:13
3.	"Eleven"	3:02
4.	"Twelve"	2:58
Total length:		12:53

== Personnel ==
- Jordan Dreyer - lead vocals, lyrics
- Brad Vander Lugt - drums, keyboards, percussion
- Chad Sterenberg - guitar
- Kevin Whittemore - guitar
- Adam Vass - bass, additional guitars
