= No Sleep Records =

American independent record label

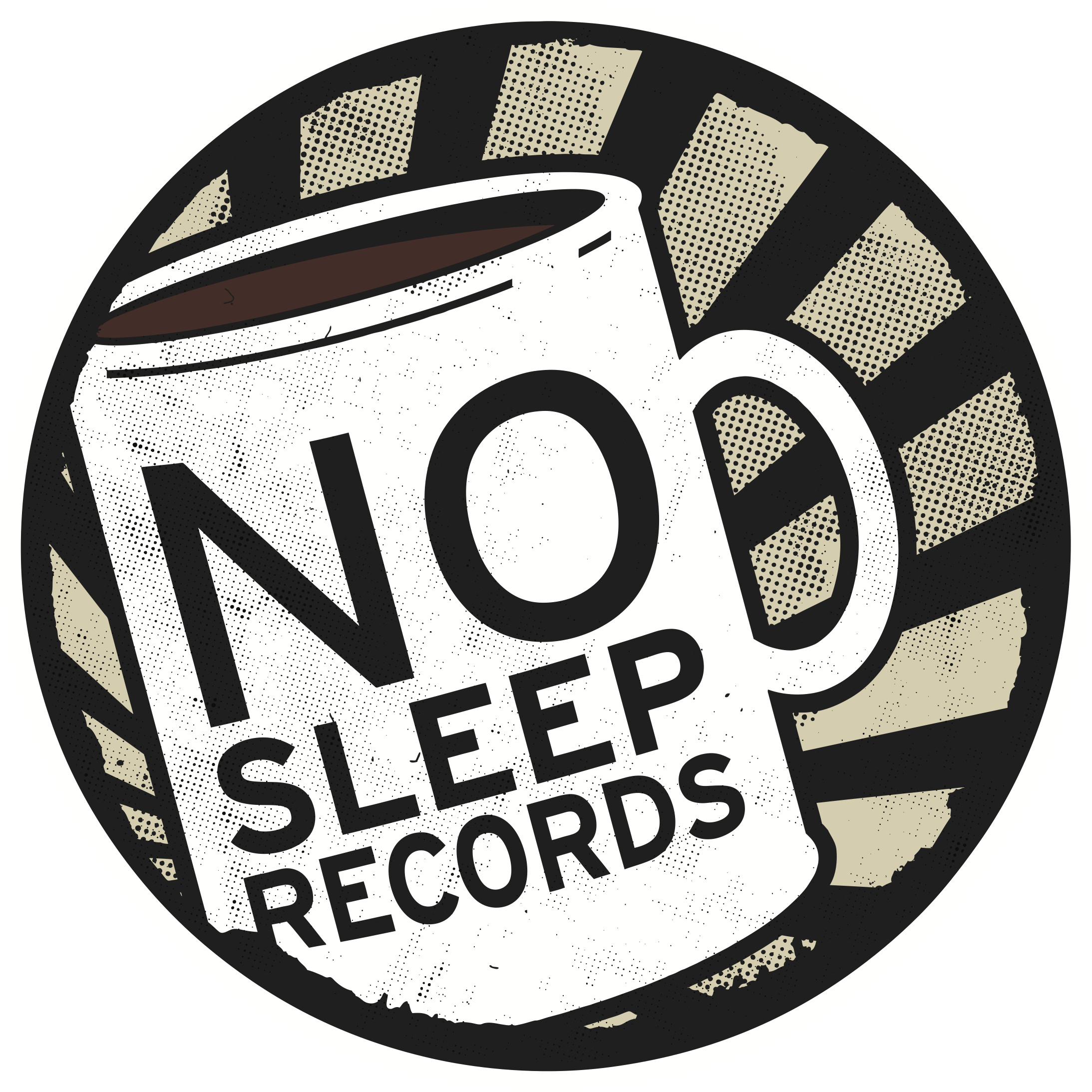
- Founded: 2006
- Founder: Chris Hansen
- Defunct: 2024
- Status: Inactive
- Distributor: Fontana Distribution
- Genre: Punk rock, hardcore punk, indie rock, emo
- Country of origin: United States
- Location: Huntington Beach, California

No Sleep Records was an American independent record label in Huntington Beach, California. They were founded by Chris Hansen in 2006 and have released records by artists including Balance and Composure, La Dispute, and The Wonder Years. They have released free sampler albums on the internet on a number of occasions and the label closely associates itself with vegan lifestyle and the revived interest in vinyl record sales. On June 25, 2024 it was announced that No Sleep Records would be shutting down.

== History ==
=== Early development (2006–2009) ===
Chris Hansen, the record label's founder, started at the bottom of the music industry in an attempt to build up experience and knowledge of owning a label. He started at Smartpunk and Fearless Records working in the mail room.

No Sleep properly released their first album when a friend of Hansen offered to release an already fully-funded and complete album on his newly-constructed label. The release was the Our American Cousin EP, which in Hansen's opinion was "a good 90s style indie/emo record". In the first two years since No Sleep's foundation, Hansen worked as an art director at Trustkill, however was laid-off and moved back to California and focused entirely on the label.

=== Expansion and growth (2010s) ===
The Wonder Years' second studio album The Upsides in 2010 acted as a significant release for the record label as the album appeared on the United States Billboard album chart. No Sleep set up their own distribution wing for the United Kingdom and European Union due to the significant success in 2010.

No Sleep Records won the 2011 Libby Award from Peta2 for being the "Most Animal Friendly Record Label" and so most No Sleep releases include a flyer on going vegan.

Across 2012, as a promotional tool, No Sleep started to offer free music to get the attention of people. Starting with the offer of a subscription package to the label, which included all their current vinyl releases, they started various initiatives like “Free Album Tuesday” for some of their lesser known artists. They also released a string of free sampler albums featuring tracks from their included artists. While some, in the early stages of its development were part of a collection of short sampler downloads called No Sleep Till Death. American online magazine Alter The Press exclusively announced one of these large releases. No Sleep's signed bands that were participating in Warped Tour 2012 were released on a Summer 2012 compilation album which included B-sides and rarities.

== Artists and releases ==
No Sleep aspires to sign bands who contribute to a very diverse roster and for all the artists to stand out from each other.

For the first pressing of an artist's debut album, No Sleep will typically put out 1,000–1,500 copies, either compact disc or vinyl. They also store a few hundred spare copies of some releases for selling in a few years when their value has increased. Vinyl has become a significant component to No Sleep's business model. Stemming from the fact that Hansen collects vinyl; most, if not all releases from No Sleep are offered in both disc and vinyl with die cut packaging, multiple color runs and etching. However, Hansen does describe it as a costly side to the label: "Vinyl is a niche thing, it's the cool thing to do, it's not a money making thing, you just do it because you love vinyl and you want it to strive and exist. No Sleep and all of our friends' labels are definitely mail order driven. That's how we sustain and keep going."

== Store ==
For Record Store Day 2012, No Sleep opened their flagship store out of their office in California which they open once a week. The store stocks works from other record labels like 6131, Animal Style, Topshelf, Run for Cover, Deathwish Inc., Bridge 9, Youth Conspiracy, and Paper + Plastick. The store also stocks, in Hansen's opinion, a lot of "key bands" from American hardcore punk and punk rock. Due to slow sales, the store has closed down.

== Artists ==
- '68 (now on Pure Noise Records)
- Adventures
- Balance and Composure (now on Memory Music)
- Best Ex
- Broadway Calls
- The Casket Lottery
- Common Sage
- La Dispute
- Drug Church (now on Pure Noise Records)
- Early Graves
- The Felix Culpa
- Funeral for a Friend
- Gatherers
- Harvey Danger
- Hot Mulligan (now on Wax Bodega)
- I Call Fives
- Into It. Over It.
- John-Allison Weiss
- Koji
- Mixtapes
- Major League
- Moose Blood
- Muskets
- Now, Now (now on LAB Records)
- No Trigger
- Rescuer
- Sainthood Reps
- Saturdays At Your Place (Now on Wax Bodega)
- Shai Hulud
- Somos
- State Faults
- Stay Inside
- The Swellers
- Touché Amoré (Now on Rise Records)
- The Wonder Years (Now on Hopeless Records, but No Sleep manages vinyl releases)
- Worst Party Ever
- WSTR (Now on Hopeless Records)
