= Thursday discography =

Discography of American rock band Thursday

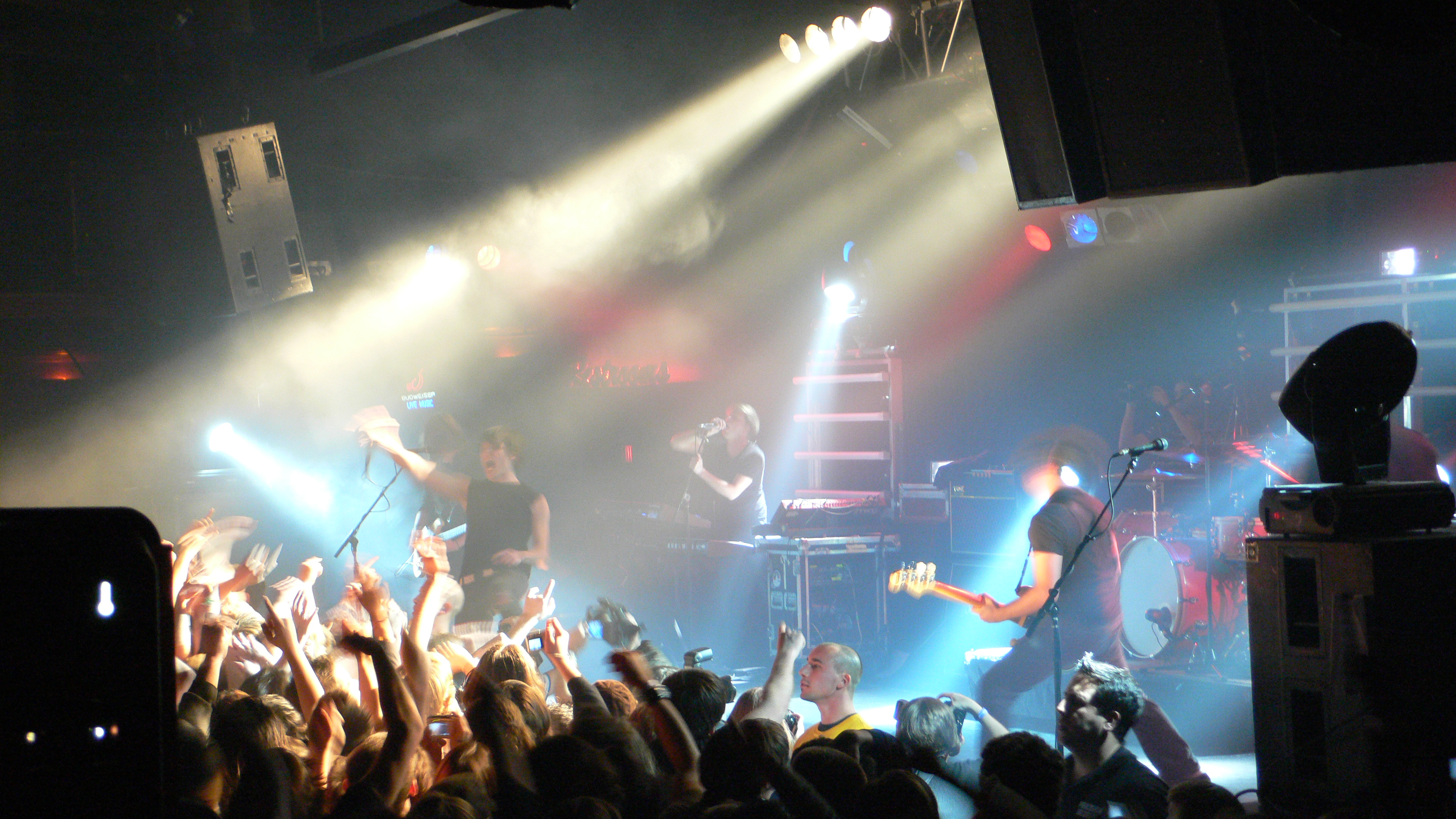
- Studio albums: 6
- Extended plays: 5
- Live albums: 4
- Compilation albums: 1
- Singles: 14
- Video albums: 1
- Music videos: 13

This article contains the complete discography of American rock band Thursday.

== Albums ==
=== Studio albums ===
List of studio albums, with selected chart positions
Title	Album details	Peak chart positions			
Title	Album details	US	AUS	CAN	UK
Waiting	Released: November 8, 1999; Label: Eyeball (EB015); Format: CD, DL, LP	—	—	—	—
Full Collapse	Released: April 10, 2001; Label: Victory (VR145); Format: CD, CS, DL, LP	178	—	—	—
War All the Time	Released: September 16, 2003; Label: Island (B0000293); Format: CD, CS, DL, LP	7	—	31	62
A City by the Light Divided	Released: May 2, 2006; Label: Island (B0006482); Format: CD, CS, DL, LP	20	63	27	112
Common Existence	Released: February 17, 2009; Label: Epitaph (87009); Format: CD, DL, LP	56	—	88	—
No Devolución	Released: April 12, 2011; Label: Epitaph (87121); Format: CD, DL, LP	63	—	—	—
"—" denotes a release that did not chart or were not released in that territory.

=== Compilation albums ===
List of compilation albums, with selected chart positions
Title	Album details	Peak chart positions
Title	Album details	US
Kill the House Lights	Released: October 30, 2007; Label: Victory (VR408); Format: CD+DVD-V, DL, LP	113

=== Live albums ===
List of live albums, with selected details
Title	Album details
Full Collapse (Live)	Released: April 22, 2022; Label: Velocity Records; Format: LP, digital; Recorded in December 2018
War All the Time (Live)	Released: June 30, 2022; Label: Velocity Records; Format: Digital, cassette; Recorded in December 2018

== Extended plays ==
List of extended plays, with selected chart positions
Title	EP details	Peak chart positions
Title	EP details	US
1999 Summer Tour EP	Released: July 1999; Label: Self-released; Format: CD	—
Split with Waterdown	Released: 2001; Format: CD	—
Five Stories Falling	Released: October 22, 2002; Label: Victory (VR189); Format: CD, DL, 12" vinyl	197
Live from the SoHo & Santa Monica Stores	Released: November 11, 2003; Label: Island; Format: DL, CD; Split with Thrice	—
Live in Detroit	Released: 2004; Label: Island (ISLR15999); Format: CD	—
Thursday / Envy	Released: November 4, 2008; Label: Temporary Residence (TRR146); Format: CD, CS, DL, 12" vinyl	—
Doves	Released: 2010; Format: 10" vinyl	—
Daytrotter Session	Released: 2011; Label: Daytrotter; Format: digital	—
"—" denotes a release that did not chart or were not released in that territory.

== Songs ==
=== Singles ===
Title	Year	Chart peak		Album
Title	Year	US Alt.	UK	Album
"Understanding in a Car Crash"	2001	—	—	Full Collapse
"Cross Out the Eyes"	2002	—	—	Full Collapse
"Standing on the Edge of Summer"	2002	—	—	Full Collapse
"For the Workforce, Drowning"	2003	—	83	War All the Time
"Signals Over the Air"	2003	30	62	War All the Time
"War All The Time"	2004	—	—	War All the Time
"Counting 5-4-3-2-1"	2006	—	—	A City by the Light Divided
"At This Velocity"	2006	—	—	A City by the Light Divided
"Resuscitation of a Dead Man"	2009	—	—	Common Existence
"Application For Release From The Dream"	2024	—	—	Non-album single
"White Bikes"	2024	—	—	Non-album single
"Taking Inventory of a Frozen Lake"	2025	—	—	Non-album single
"—" denotes a release that did not chart.

=== Other appearances ===
Title	Year	Album
"Ian Curtis"	2000	Status 12
"Mass as Shadows" (new mix)	2000	With Literacy and Justice for All...
"Porcelain"	2000	Fiddler Records Sampler
"This Side of Brightness"	2000	Summertime
"Autobiography of a Nation" (live)	2001	Plea for Peace: Take Action
"Cross Out the Eyes"	2001	Groupies Suck Volume 1
"Cross Out the Eyes"	2001	Summer Sampler 2001
"Paris in Flames"	2001	Psychosonic! Volume 25
"Understanding in a Car Crash"	2001	Cop Out
"Understanding in a Car Crash"	2001	Rock Sound Volume 55
"Understanding in a Car Crash"	2001	Metal Hammer May 2001
"Understanding in a Car Crash"	2001	Music with Attitude Volume 24
"Understanding in a Car Crash"	2001	CMJ New Music Monthly Volume 97
"Understanding in a Car Crash"	2001	Rock Sound Volume 39
"Understanding in a Car Crash"	2001	Rock Sound Volume 55
"Understanding in a Car Crash"	2001	Rock Selects
"Understanding in a Car Crash"	2001	United World of Metal Vol. 1
"Wind-Up	2001	Broken Lamps and Hardcore Memories
"Cross Out the Eyes"	2002	Rock 'n' Ride 2002
"Cross Out the Eyes"	2002	Punk Rawk Show: Taking Back the Airwaves
"Cross Out the Eyes"	2002	Vans Warped Tour 2002
"Cross Out the Eyes"	2002	Victory Video Collection 2002
"Standing on the Edge of Summer"	2002	Victory Records Spring Sampler 2002
"A Hole in the World" (acoustic)	2003	Punk Goes Acoustic
"Cross Out the Eyes"	2003	19 Tracks of Everything Louder Than Everything Else!
"Cross Out the Eyes"	2003	Modern Rock Radio July 2002
"Cross Out the Eyes"	2003	Victory Style 5
"Evacuate" (Negative Approach cover)	2003	Tomorrow Seems So Hopeless
"For the Worforce, Drowning"	2003	Split with Thrice
"For the Worforce, Drowning"	2003	Quintessenzen: UMIS On the Rocks
"For the Worforce, Drowning"	2003	Take Action! Vol. 3
"For the Worforce, Drowning"	2003	Volume Dealer
"Ný Batterí"	2003	Hard to Get Volume 1: An Island Rarities Compilation
"Paris in Flames"	2003	Punk Chunks 2
"Porcelain"	2003	Eyeball Records 2003
"Signals Over The Air"	2003	Big Day Out 04: 38 Explosive Crackers
"Signals Over The Air"	2003	Hitz Rock 2003 Volume 8
"Signals Over The Air"	2003	Hot Hits Music 138
"Signals Over The Air"	2003	Hot Video October 2003
"Signals Over The Air"	2003	Modern Rock Radio August 2003
"Signals Over The Air"	2003	Modern Rock Radio November 03
"Signals Over The Air"	2003	Radio Heavy Rock Presenta School of Rock
"Signals Over The Air"	2003	Rock Sound Volume 69
"Signals Over The Air"	2003	The Cornerstone Player 047
"Signals Over The Air"	2003	The Spirit of Radio: The Music Then and Now
"Signals Over The Air"	2003	U-Mode October 2003
"Signals Over The Air"	2003	Universal Music UK Q4 2003
"Understanding in a Car Crash"	2003	123 Punk Volume 2
"Understanding in a Car Crash"	2003	Cinema Board Buddy: Punk Rock Skate
"Understanding in a Car Crash"	2003	Cinema Beer Buddy
"Understanding in a Car Crash"	2003	Harder Core Than Thou
"Understanding in a Car Crash"	2003	Monthly Music Sampler March 2002
"Understanding in a Car Crash"	2003	Monitor This! Monitor That! April/May 2002
"Understanding in a Car Crash"	2003	MTV Road Rules
"War All The Time"	2003	Universal Music International Weekly Showreel
"For the Workforce, Drowning"	2004	Projekt Revolution Sampler
"Jet Black New Year (live)", "Mother Mary" (live Far cover)	2004	Hellfest Volume III
"Mass as Shadows"	2004	In Honor: A Compilation to Beat Cancer
"Signals Over The Air"	2004	Hidden Treasures
"Signals Over The Air"	2004	Homesick DVD Compilation Vol. 1
"Signals Over The Air"	2004	School of Rock
"Signals Over The Air"	2004	Universal Music Weekly Showreel 1/2004
"Signals Over The Air"	2004	Y100 Sonic Sessions Volume 8
"Steps Ascending"	2004	Welcome to the Desert
"Tomorrow I'll Be You"	2004	Vans Warped Tour 2004
"War All The Time"	2004	99X Upstart Bands Vol. 1
"War All The Time"	2004	Aerodome Rock Festival Sampler
"War All The Time"	2004	Modern Rock Radio February 04
"War All The Time"	2004	Monitor This!
"War All The Time"	2004	Rock Sound Volume 74
"War All The Time"	2004	Rock Sound Volume 87
"War All The Time"	2004	Untitled
"War All The Time"	2004	X-Rock #04
"Cross Out the Eyes"	2005	Punk Rock Hardcore Filmmaking
"Cross Out the Eyes"	2005	Assemblage v1.0
"Division St." (acoustic)	2005	Masters of Horror
"Ever Fallen in Love (With Someone You Shouldn't've)" (Buzzcocks cover)	2005	Tony Hawk's American Wasteland Soundtrack
"For the Workforce, Drowning"	2005	Zippo Hot Tour
"I Wanna Hear Another Fast Song"	2005	The Best of Taste of Chaos
"Porcelain"	2005	Eastpak's Pro Punkrocker 4
"Signals Over The Air"	2005	Punk Island
"Counting 5-4-3-2-1"	2006	A Taste of Chaos!
"Counting 5-4-3-2-1"	2006	Blacktop Guerillas
"Counting 5-4-3-2-1"	2006	Modern Rock Radio April 2006
"Counting 5-4-3-2-1"	2006	Music for the Fall
"Counting 5-4-3-2-1"	2006	Rockzone 17
"Counting 5-4-3-2-1"	2006	Sampler 7 2006
"Counting 5-4-3-2-1"	2006	U-Mode May 2006
"Counting 5-4-3-2-1"	2006	Universal Music Group Compilation
"Running from the Rain", "The Other Side of the Crash/Over and Out (of Control)"	2006	Unverhört
"War All The Time"	2006	As Chaos Falls
"At This Velocity"	2007	The Best of Taste of Chaos Two
"Even the Sand is Made of Seashells"	2007	Everything Will Be Much Better Once I Get These Clowns Out Of My Head
"Ladies and Gentlemen, My Brother the Failure"	2007	Winter Sampler
"Understanding in a Car Crash"	2007	Another Victory Publishing
"Understanding in a Car Crash"	2007	Under The Influence
"War All The Time"	2007	Earcrusher
"Cross Out the Eyes"	2008	2008 Music Sampler
"Dead Songs"	2008	Soundwave 2008
"Beyond the Visible Spectrum"	2009	Sound Check No. 119
"Circuits of Fever"	2009	2009 Epitaph Tour Sampler
"Friends in the Armed Forces"	2009	Vans Warped Tour 2009 Compilation
"Resuscitation of a Dead Man"	2009	Atticus IV
"Resuscitation of a Dead Man"	2009	Modern Rock Radio March 2009
"Resuscitation of a Dead Man"	2009	Vice Guide to Festivals
"Signals Over The Air"	2010	Midnight Diaries
"Magnets Caught in a Metal Heart"	2011	Epitaph Winter/Spring 2011 Sampler
"Magnets Caught in a Metal Heart"	2011	Alternative Press Mini Mag
"No Answers"	2011	100% Volume No. 147
"Past and Future Ruins"	2011	Split with Underoath
"Standing on the Edge of Summer"	2011	Another Victory
"Turnpike Divides"	2011	Summer/Fall 2011 Sampler
"Understanding in a Car Crash"	2011	Victory Records Sampler
"No Answers"	2012	Soundwave MMXII
"Rape Me" (Nirvana cover)	2014	In Utero, in Tribute, in Entirety
"Understanding in a Car Crash"	2016	Groezrock 25 Years
