= Live in Detroit =

Live in Detroit may refer to:

- Live in Detroit (The Doors album), 2000
- Live in Detroit (The Stooges album), 2004
- Live in Detroit – 1984, an album by Black 'n Blue, 2001
- Live in Detroit, MI, an album by King Crimson, 2001
- Live in Detroit, an album by Roscoe Mitchell, 1988
- Live in Detroit, an album by Thor, 1985
- Live in Detroit, an EP by Thursday, 2003
- Drowned World Tour 2001 (video), listed as Live in Detroit on some record charts, a video album by Madonna, 2001
