= Kill the House Lights =

2007 live album by Thursday

Compilation album / video by Thursday
- Released: October 30, 2007
- Recorded: 1997–2007
- Genre: Emo, screamo, post-hardcore, melodic hardcore
- Label: Victory
- Producer: Sal Villanueva

Thursday chronology
A City by the Light Divided (2006)	Kill the House Lights (2007)	Thursday / Envy (2008)

Professional ratings
Review scores
Source	Rating
AllMusic	(favorable)
Exclaim!	Unfavorable
Melodic	3.5/5 stars
Punknews.org	4.5/5 stars

Kill the House Lights is a compilation album by New Jersey rock group Thursday.

== Contents ==
The name of the record derives from a lyric from the song "M. Shepard" from the band's 2003 album War All the Time. The CD features five new songs, two live recordings, a couple of outtakes, and three demos. The DVD features interviews and a concert, which was filmed on December 27, 2006, at Starland Ballroom in Sayreville, New Jersey. They recorded their smaller show at Maxwell's in Hoboken, NJ the next day.

== Release ==
On June 29, 2007, it was announced that the band would be releasing an untitled retrospective album through Victory Records. On August 30, the album's title was revealed: Kill the House Lights, and would be released in October. On September 20, it was revealed that the retrospective would include a mixture of live and demo recordings, as well as new songs. In early October, the group announced they were filming a music video for "Ladies and Gentlemen: My Brother, the Failure" with director Travis Kopach in New York City. On October 16, "Ladies and Gentlemen: My Brother, the Failure" was made available for streaming through the group's Myspace profile. Two days later, the documentary had its debut screening at The Scandinavian House in New York City. Kill the House Lights was released on October 30 through Victory Records. It was promoted with a US tour with Circle Takes the Square and Portugal. The Man throughout the following month. The music video for "Ladies and Gentlemen: My Brother, the Failure" was posted online on November 14. In February and March 2008, the band toured Australia as part of the Soundwave festival, alongside two headlining shows with Envy on the Coast, The Receiving End of Sirens, Scary Kids Scaring Kids, and Saosin.

== Track listing ==
All music written by Thursday. All lyrics written by Geoff Rickly.

=== CD ===
1. "Ladies and Gentlemen: My Brother, the Failure" (with Tim Kasher) - 4:12
2. "Dead Songs" - 2:52
3. "Voices on a String" - 3:33
4. "Signals Over the Air" (live at Starland Ballroom) - 4:25
5. "How Long Is the Night?" (original intro) - 6:45
6. "A Sketch for Time's Arrow" - 1:39
7. "Panic on the Streets of Health Care City" - 3:15
8. "The Roar of Far Off Black Jets" - 1:59
9. "Paris in Flames" (demo) - 4:32
10. "Telegraph Avenue Kiss" (Rich Costey mix) - 3:42
11. "Wind Up" (demo) - 4:08
12. "Music from Kill the House Lights" (demo) - 1:16
- "A Sketch for Time's Arrow" is a demo of "Time's Arrow" from the subsequent album Common Existence
- "Panic on the Streets of Health Care City" is an alternate version of "The Other Side Of A Crash/Over And Out (Of Control)" from A City By The Light Divided
- "Music from Kill the House Lights" is a demo of "In Silence" from the split 12" with Japan's Envy.

Best Buy Bonus Tracks

13. "Cross Out the Eyes" (live at The Grove) - 4:22
14. "Steps Ascending" (live at The Grove) - 5:27
15. "How Long Is the Night?" (live at The Grove) - 7:24

Hot Topic Bonus Tracks

13. "Concealer" (demo) - 2:23
14. "Telegraph Avenue Kiss" (demo) - 3:46

=== DVD ===
Live Performance (at the Starland Ballroom)

1. "At This Velocity" - 2:50
2. "Otherside of the Crash/Over and Out (of Control)" - 4:39
3. "Paris in Flames" - 4:26
4. "Autobiography of a Nation" - 3:35
5. "Understanding in a Car Crash" - 4:12
6. "Signals Over the Air" - 4:19
7. "Sugar in the Sacrament" - 4:52
8. "Jet Black New Year" - 4:44
9. "Steps Ascending" - 4:19
10. "Division St." - 4:04

Full Length Movie: Kill the House Lights

1. Intro: Live from Starland Ballroom, Music: "Otherside of the Crash" (in reverse)
2. "At This Velocity" - Live at Starland Ballroom
3. "This Side of Brightness" audio clip of early demo
4. "The Other Side of the Crash" live at Starland Ballroom
5. "Mass As Shadows" early demo
6. "Streaks In the Sky" live in Geoff's basement
7. "Porcelain" live
8. "Paris In Flames" live at Starland Ballroom
9. "In Transmission" live
10. "Ian Curtis" live at the Melody Bar
11. "Autobiography of a Nation" live at Starland Ballroom
12. "Steps Ascending" live in Detroit
13. "Understanding In a Car Crash" clips from the original music video
14. "How Long is The Night" audio clip of original intro
15. "Understanding In A Car Crash" live at Starland Ballroom
16. "I Am The Killer" instrumental into live footage at Warped Tour
17. "How Long Is The Night" live at the Warsaw
18. "Cross Out The Eyes" instrumental mix
19. "Division Street" live in Detroit
20. "Roar of Far Off Black Jets" audio clip
21. "From "Marches And Maneuvers"
22. "For The Workforce, Drowning" music video clip
23. "Sugar In The Sacrament" live at Starland Ballroom
24. "Music From Kill The House Lights"
25. "Blinding Light" video clip from Taste of Chaos in Australia
26. "Skate And Surf video Short"
27. "I1100" instrumental mix
- The track listing above is of the music featured in documentary entitled "Kill the House Lights".

Bonus material

1. "I Am the Killer" (Live)
2. "Moe, Larry & Surly"
3. "Ballad of Andrew"
- The recording of "I Am the Killer" is not the recording featured in Kill the House Lights.
- "Ballad of Andrew" is video of Andrew before he joined as an official band member, working as the runner for War All the Time, doing tasks such as fixing the radiator in the producer's van.

== Personnel ==
- Geoff Rickly - vocals
- Tom Keeley - lead guitar, vocals
- Steve Pedulla - rhythm guitar, vocals
- Tim Payne - bass guitar
- Tucker Rule - drums
- Andrew Everding - keyboards, synthesizers, vocals

== Charts ==
Chart performance for Kill the House Lights
Chart (2007)	Peak position
UK Independent Albums (OCC)	22
UK Rock & Metal Albums (OCC)	30
US Billboard 200	113
US Independent Albums (Billboard)	10
