= Permanence (album) =

Studio album by No Devotion
- Released: 25 September 2015
- Recorded: 2014–2015
- Genres: New wave; post-punk; psychedelic pop; synth-pop; electronic rock
- Length: 47:32
- Label: Collect
- Producers: Dave Fridmann; Alex Newport

No Devotion chronology
Permanence (2015)	No Oblivion (2022)

Singles from Permanence
- 1. "Stay" Released: 1 July 2014; 2. "10,000 Summers" Released: 27 October 2014; 3. "Addition" Released: 6 July 2015; 4. "Permanent Sunlight" Released: 18 August 2015

Permanence is the debut studio album by the Welsh-American rock band No Devotion. It was released on 25 September 2015 through Collect Records. It was reissued on 6 June 2022 through Velocity Records after the collapse of Collect Records.

== Background ==
Following Lostprophets frontman Ian Watkins' incarceration for child sex offences, No Devotion was formed. Bassist Stuart Richardson explained that they were unsure "if we would ever make music again or if people would look us in the face. Everything felt like it was over". In April 2014, it was announced that then-former Thursday frontman Geoff Rickly would be working with No Devotion through his own label, Collect Records. Rickly regarded their new material as being influenced by Joy Division, New Order, and the Cure, although he did not discuss whether he was going to join the band.

A month later, the group confirmed they would be making music with Rickly on vocals; Rickly said the former Lostprophets members "needed a second chance". On 1 July, the band released their first single "Stay", with B-side "Eyeshadow". In late July, the band went on a short tour. On 27 October, "10,000 Summers" was released as a single with the B-sides "Only Thing" and the demo version of "10,000 Summers". In early January 2015, it was announced that drummer Luke Johnson had left the band, feeling that he would be unable to fulfill commitments. Matt Tong of Bloc Party filled in on drums to help the band finish recording their debut album. Also in January, the band supported Gerard Way on his tour of the UK. Richardson stated in 2019 that the album was written while Watkins' trial was ongoing.

== Production ==
When asked about what influences his song writing, Rickly replied with "Films [and] Novels. I think music is always aching for two things: narrative and visual pacing. The narrative is the job of a good singer or a truly visionary producer. The visual is often overlooked. That's why our album is so design heavy".

Permanence was mixed by Dave Fridmann and produced by Richardson and Alex Newport.

== Release ==
On 30 June 2015, Permanence was announced for release. On 6 July, "Addition" was released as a single. "Addition" was released to radio on 17 August. A day later, "Permanent Sunlight" was released as a single. Permanence was made available for streaming on 21 September. The album was released through Collect Records on 25 September. In October and November, the band went on a tour of Europe.

== Reception ==
Professional ratings
Aggregate scores
Source	Rating
Metacritic	79/100
Review scores
Source	Rating
AbsolutePunk	7.8/10
NME	3/5
Punknews.org	4/5 stars
Sputnikmusic	4.5/5
Team Rock	(favourable)

Permanence charted in the UK at number 120. "I Wanna Be Your God" was included on Alternative Press's list of "12 new songs you need to hear from September 2015".

Rock Sound reviewer Rob Sayce noted the album's fusion of "shimmering electronic textures with elements of post-punk, psychedelic pop and a hefty dose of gloom". Sayce wrote how Rickly managed to sow together the collection's "various threads with real passion and intensity". Sayce mentioned that those who grew up with The Cure's material "should feel right at home". The album was ranked at number 8 in Alternative Press's "10 Essential Records of 2015" list. Jason Pettigrew of Alternative Press wrote that the album "exceed[ed] fans' and detractors' preconceived notions with equal measures of heart-hitting pop and urbane rock cool". The album was included at number 12 on Rock Sound's top 50 releases of 2015 list. Permanence won Best Album at the 2016 Kerrang! Awards.

== Track listing ==
All songs written by No Devotion.

No.	Title	Length
1.	"Break"	4:17
2.	"Permanent Sunlight"	4:36
3.	"Eyeshadow"	3:50
4.	"Why Can't I Be with You"	4:00
5.	"I Wanna Be Your God"	3:58
6.	"Death Rattle"	2:52
7.	"10,000 Summers"	4:15
8.	"Night Drive"	6:03
9.	"Stay"	4:00
10.	"Addition"	3:36
11.	"Grand Central"	5:59
Total length:		47:26

== Personnel ==
No Devotion

- Geoff Rickly – lead vocals
- Jamie Oliver – vocals, piano, keyboards, synths
- Lee Gaze – lead guitar, backing vocals
- Mike Lewis – rhythm guitar, backing vocals
- Stuart Richardson – bass guitar, backing vocals
- Luke Johnson – drums, percussion (tracks 3, 5, 7–11)

Additional musicians

- Matt Tong – drums, percussion (tracks 1, 2, 4 and 6)

== Chart positions ==
Chart (2015)	Peak position
UK Albums (OCC)	120
UK Rock & Metal Albums (OCC)	10
