= No Devotion =

Welsh-American rock band

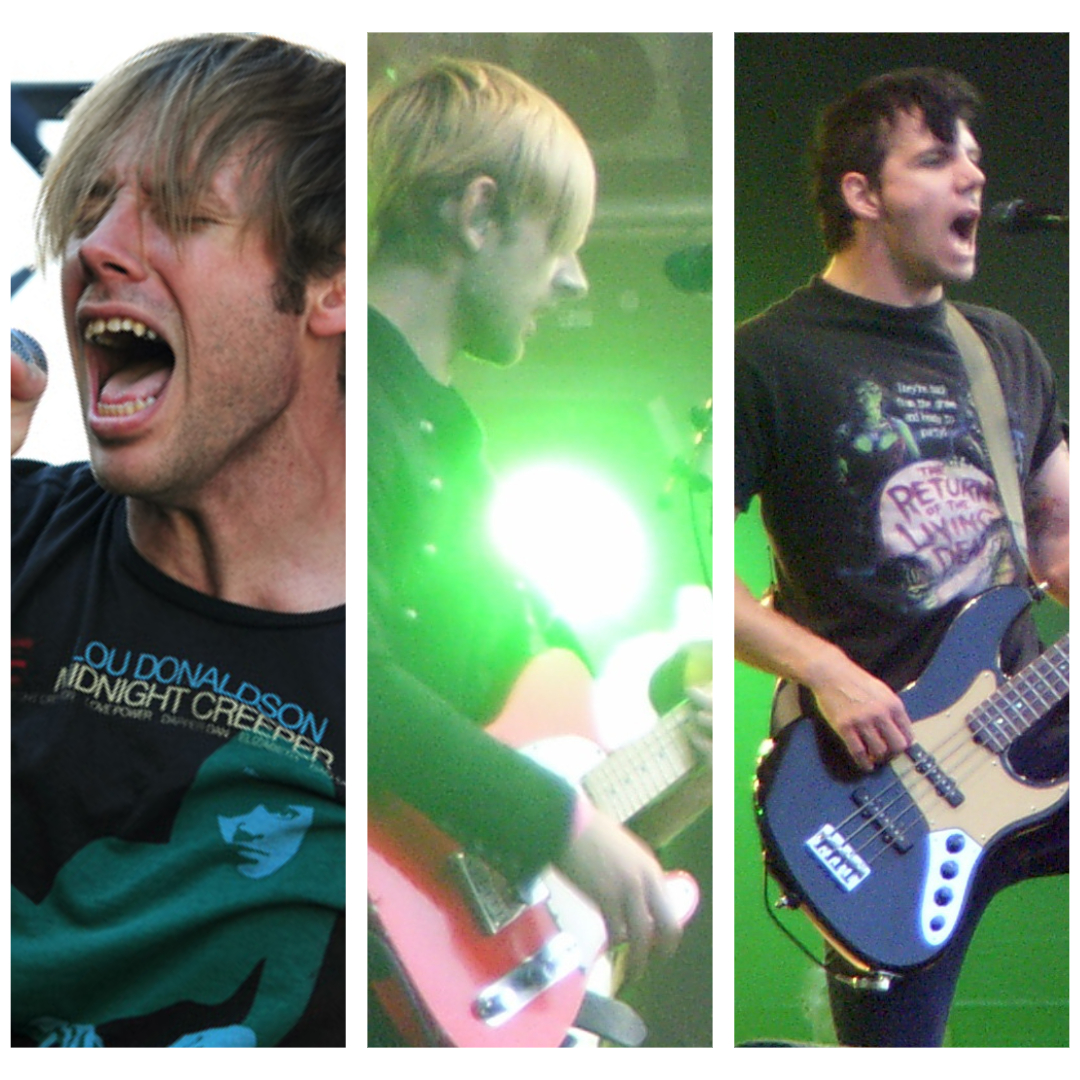
- Lineup of No Devotion since 2021. From left to right: Geoff Rickly, Lee Gaze, Stu Richardson

Background information
- Origin: Pontypridd, Wales; Cardiff, Wales
- Genres: Alternative rock; post-punk; electronic rock
- Years active: 2014–present
- Labels: Collect; Velocity; Equal Vision
- Spinoff of: Lostprophets; Thursday
- Members: Geoff Rickly; Lee Gaze; Stu Richardson
- Past members: Luke Johnson; Jamie Oliver; Mike Lewis
- Website: nodevotion.com

No Devotion are a Welsh-American alternative rock band formed in Pontypridd and Cardiff in 2014. It currently features American vocalist Geoff Rickly of the band Thursday, along with Stuart Richardson and Lee Gaze, former members of Lostprophets.

Formed in 2014 after Lostprophets' dissolution, the founding lineup featured all remaining members (Richardson, Gaze, Luke Johnson, Mike Lewis, Jamie Oliver) alongside Rickly. Drummer Luke Johnson left the band in 2015. Later that year, No Devotion released the debut album, Permanence, produced by Dave Fridmann. The band went inactive in 2016 after Rickly's label Collect Records folded because of investor Martin Shkreli's conviction. Rhythm guitarist Mike Lewis and keyboardist Jamie Oliver left the band during the hiatus. The band returned in 2022 with their second album No Oblivion.

== History ==
=== Formation and Johnson's departure (2014–2015) ===
Ian Watkins, singer of the Welsh group Lostprophets was arrested in Wales during December 2012 on multiple charges, including possession of indecent images of children being stored on his computer as well as the attempted rape of a one month old baby. Watkins ultimately pled guilty in November 2013 and was sentenced to 29 years imprisonment, and about this same time Lostprophets broke up.

According to bassist Stuart Richardson, the band launched themselves into new music as quickly as possible, to separate their legacies from Watkins. In April 2014, the former members of Lostprophets formed No Devotion. Then-former Thursday frontman Geoff Rickly confirmed in an interview on Radio Cardiff that he would be working with the remaining Lostprophets members on their new project through his own label, Collect Records. Rickly described their new music as being influenced by Joy Division, New Order, and The Cure, although he did not confirm if he was going to be joining the band.

On 1 May 2014, it was announced Rickly would officially join the new group as lead vocalist, with Rickly saying the former Lostprophets members "deserved a second chance". On 1 July, the band unveiled their debut single "Stay", along with another song titled "Eyeshadow", as well as details of a short four-date tour taking place in Cardiff, Manchester, London, and Glasgow. Ahead of the first performances, the band confirmed that they would not continue playing music from the Lostprophets discography. The band's first live performances received positive reviews from critics and fans.

On 18 August 2014, No Devotion announced that they would be opening for Neon Trees on their First Things First tour. However, the tour was abruptly cancelled as a result of a significant heart surgery for Neon Trees bassist Branden Campbell.

On 6 October 2014, on the BBC Radio 1 Rock Show, Daniel P. Carter premiered the band's second single, "10,000 Summers", along with the B-side "Only Thing". Johnson left the band later that month, feeling that he would be unable to fulfil commitments to the band. The decision was made in 2014 but was not made public until January 2015, with former Bloc Party drummer Matt Tong completing the recording of their first album, and Phil Jenkins of Kids in Glass Houses joining as a live member.

In January 2015, they embarked on their second UK tour, taking place in Bristol, Birmingham, Southampton, Reading, and London, supporting Gerard Way on three of the dates.

On 30 June, the band announced they would be releasing their debut album, titled Permanence, in September, and released two songs titled "Death Rattle" and "Addition".

=== Permanence (2015) ===
On 17 August 2015, their fourth single "Permanent Sunlight" was released. On 29 and 30 August, they played at the Reading and Leeds Festival as part of their tour with Seether and Baroness, which included the live debut of the aforementioned song. On 27 August, the band announced further dates in Germany, the UK and US. Whilst in Germany, Rickly was drugged and robbed with that night's show then cancelled.

On 21 September, they released their debut album, Permanence, on SoundCloud, four days before its official release. Four days later on September 25, Permanence received its official release to positive reviews. The album went on to win the 2016 Kerrang! Album of the Year award.

On 17 November 2015, they released a music video for their single "Permanent Sunlight".

Collect Records, which No Devotion was signed to, folded after it was revealed that since-convicted pharmaceutical executive Martin Shkreli was secretly a major investor behind the label. As a result, Permanence was removed from streaming services and the band's future remained uncertain.

=== Hiatus and No Oblivion (2016–present) ===
In August 2017, Rickly's former band Thursday reunited. Thursday broke up for the second time in March 2019. Thursday reunited again in 2020.

While No Devotion was still inactive, band members announced a second album to be released by the end of 2019. In June 2019, Gaze confirmed that Oliver left the band in 2017 and Lewis would not perform on the band's second album. Richardson revealed in December 2019 that No Devotion had around eight songs completed for their second album, but plans for the album's release were still not yet finalised.

Both No Devotion and Thursday signed with Velocity Records in February 2021. Gaze confirmed Lewis' departure from the band via Twitter by changing his biography to reflect being one-third of the band.

On 6 June 2022, Permanence was re-released on streaming sites under Velocity Records. On 12 July, "Starlings", the first single from their newly announced second album, No Oblivion, was released. On 16 August, the band's second single "Repeaters" was released. On 16 September, the album No Oblivion was released.

== Band members ==
Current members

- Geoff Rickly – lead vocals (2014–present)
- Lee Gaze – lead guitar, backing vocals (2014–present), rhythm guitar (2021–present)
- Stu Richardson – bass, backing vocals (2014–present), keyboards, programming (2017–present)

Former members

- Luke Johnson – drums, percussion (2014–2015)
- Jamie Oliver – keyboards, programming, vocals (2014–2017)
- Mike Lewis – rhythm guitar, backing vocals (2014–2021)

Touring members

- Philip Jenkins – drums, percussion (2015–2017)
- Andrew King – drums, percussion (2022–present)

Session musicians

- Matt Tong – drums, percussion (2014–2015)

Timeline

== Discography ==
No Devotion discography
- Studio albums: 2
- Singles: 6
- Music videos: 5

=== Studio albums ===
List of studio albums, with selected details
Title	Details
Permanence	Released: 25 September 2015; Label: Collect (CLTD-1014, CLTD 1014); Formats: CD, DL, LP
No Oblivion	Released: 16 September 2022; Label: Velocity, Equal Vision; Formats: CD, DL, LP

=== Singles ===
List of singles, showing year released and album name
Title	Year	Album
"Stay"	2014	Permanence
"10,000 Summers"	2014	Permanence
"Addition"	2015	Permanence
"Permanent Sunlight"	2015	Permanence
"Starlings"	2022	No Oblivion
"Repeaters"	2022	No Oblivion

=== Music videos ===
List of music videos
Title	Year	Director(s)	Ref.
"Eyeshadow"	2014	Liza de Guia	
"Permanent Sunlight"	2015	Liza de Guia and Geoff Rickly	
"Starlings"	2022	Unknown	
"Repeaters"	2022	Liza de Guia	
"No Oblivion"	2022	David Brodsky	

== Awards ==
=== Kerrang! awards ===
Year	Nominee / work	Award	Result
2016	Permanence	Best Album	Won
