= No Oblivion =

Studio album by No Devotion
- Released: 16 September 2022
- Genre: Alternative rock
- Length: 37:32
- Label: Velocity; Equal Vision
- Producer: Stu Richardson

No Devotion chronology
Permanence (2015)	No Oblivion (2022)

Singles from No Oblivion
- 1. "Starlings" Released: 12 July 2022; 2. "Repeaters" Released: 16 August 2022

Professional ratings
Review scores
Source	Rating
Kerrang!	3/5

No Oblivion is the second studio album by the Welsh-American rock band No Devotion. It was released on 16 September 2022 through Velocity Records. It is the first album from the band to not feature previous members Luke Johnson, Jamie Oliver and Mike Lewis, who all departed the band. It is also the first of the band's releases not to be released by Collect Records, which folded after the company severed ties with Martin Shkreli who was revealed to be a silent investor in the label.

== Track listing ==
All songs written by No Devotion.

No.	Title	Length
1.	"Starlings"	3:55
2.	"No Oblivion"	4:11
3.	"A Sky Deep and Clear"	4:48
4.	"Love Songs from Fascist Italy"	5:31
5.	"The End of Longing"	5:04
6.	"Endless Desire"	4:37
7.	"Repeaters"	4:59
8.	"In a Broken Land"	4:27
Total length:		37:32

== Personnel ==
No Devotion

- Geoff Rickly – lead vocals
- Lee Gaze – lead guitar, rhythm guitar, backing vocals
- Stuart Richardson – bass, piano, keyboards, synths

Additional personnel

- Andrew King – drums
- Dave Fridmann – mixing
