= Counting 5-4-3-2-1 =

Single by Thursday

from the album A City by the Light Divided
- Released: April 11, 2006
- Genre: Post-hardcore, post-punk revival
- Length: 3:07 (radio edit); 3:19
- Label: Island
- Songwriters: Geoff Rickly, Tom Keely, Steve Pedulla, Tim Payne, Andrew Everding, Tucker Rule
- Producer: Dave Fridmann

Thursday singles chronology
"Signals Over the Air" (2003)	"Counting 5-4-3-2-1" (2006)	"Resuscitation of a Dead Man" (2009)

"Counting 5-4-3-2-1" is a song by American post-hardcore band Thursday, the first single from their fourth album, A City by the Light Divided. "Counting 5-4-3-2-1" was released to radio on April 11, 2006.

The song was originally written during the Full Collapse-era, but was re-arranged in a new key and was deemed suitable to be recorded.

Keyboardist Andrew Everding commented on the song's meaning and corresponding music video: "[Counting 5-4-3-2-1] specifically comes from not being happy in the town that you grew up in and wanting to get out as quickly as possible. When we do videos, we send out a call and receive treatments and that one was one of the first ones that we got from Artificial Army. We were originally going to do two videos…a low-budget animated video and then we were going to do another video to connect it, but then we started seeing what the animation was about. We usually go back and forth with ideas. But for the most part, we trust the director. It was our first storyline video but there are some performance elements to it."

== Personnel ==
- Geoff Rickly - vocals
- Tom Keeley - lead guitar, vocals
- Steve Pedulla - rhythm guitar, vocals
- Tim Payne - bass guitar
- Tucker Rule - drums
- Andrew Everding - keyboards, synthesizers
