= No Devolución =

- The cover art for No Devolución is a paper art piece created by Mia Pearlman titled "Penumbra".

Studio album by Thursday
- Released: April 12, 2011
- Recorded: July 2010
- Studios: Tarbox Road, Stockton, New York
- Genres: Post-hardcore; post-rock
- Length: 53:09
- Label: Epitaph (87121)
- Producer: Dave Fridmann

Thursday chronology
Common Existence (2009)	No Devolución (2011)

Singles from No Devolución
- 1. "Past and Future Ruins" Released: February 21, 2011

No Devolución (Spanglish for No return, the correct Spanish phrase being Sin devolución) is the sixth studio album by the American rock band Thursday. The record was released through Epitaph Records on April 12, 2011, and it was Thursday's final album before their five-year breakup from 2011 to 2016 and their most recent album to date. The musical style on No Devolución is a departure from the more traditional post-hardcore sound on Thursday's earlier records, and instead explores darker and more atmospheric tones.

== Writing and recording ==
Thursday entered Tarbox Road Studios in Fredonia, New York with producer Dave Fridmann in July 2010. Fridmann had previously produced the band's previous two studio albums: 2006's A City by the Light Divided and 2009's Common Existence. In a press release for the album, vocalist Geoff Rickly commented, "We've worked with Dave Fridmann before, but this is definitely the most we've ever clicked with him." Fridmann was also inspired by the new direction Thursday was taking their music, and assisted the band in taking their music to new areas.

Thursday entered the studio without any demos and impulsively wrote No Devolución on the spot. Within a week the band had a full album written – a dramatically shorter time frame for Thursday as their previous albums had taken between six months and a year to compose. In an effort to "[keep] the songs fresher," recording was performed in several two-week periods with a month off in between sessions. The album's closing song "Stay True" was an improvised studio warm-up song based around a guitar part. Each day a new variation of the instrumental song was performed and recorded live, with some versions lasting up to 20 minutes. The nearly eight-minute track that appears on No Devolución was Thursday's favorite version of the song, and vocals were later recorded for it. Rickly also recorded some of his vocal parts in the forest that surrounds Tarbox Road Studios.

== Composition and lyrics ==
"There's a lot of breakup records out there that only address the end of relationships, and I think the theme of devotion doesn't get explored that often. If devotion is the theme, the new record is a prism that's being used to refract all of its different aspects."

— Geoff Rickly, New Jersey Herald

Unlike previous Thursday albums, Geoff Rickly did not compose any guitar parts for No Devolución. He wanted to let the members "who actually do the playing on the album [take] charge," and allow them to experiment with "new sounds and directions." According to Rickly, each song on the album explores its own musical direction and "vibe" resulting in a collection of sonically diverse songs. Influences such as My Bloody Valentine and Mogwai in particular came to the forefront on the album.

The music is also a departure from the sound found on Thursday's earlier albums. This idea is supported by the album title which translates from Spanish to "no returns."

Musically, the record has been described as being atmospheric, dark and moody. The vocal style has also evolved from previous Thursday albums. Rickly described his singing style as "desperate" and at the top of his range in the past, but for No Devolución he gives a more "sung delivery" that better paired with "beautiful passages."

While writing for No Devolución, Rickly's marriage was described as being "on the rocks," which had an effect on some of the lyrics. All of the songs center themselves around the concept and theme of devotion. The song "No Answers" analyzes the difficulties in maintaining a friendship with a former lover. According to Rickly, after being in a relationship with someone for an extended period of time, "there's more important levels to the relationship than simple romance." Another common lyrical theme on No Devolución is how religious symbols can inadvertently divide the masses, which is most exemplified on the song "A Gun in the First Act." The song "Stay True" was written about Touché Amoré—a group that Rickly knows through his vinyl-only label, Collect Records. He stated, "In thinking about what I wish for them, their band and all the mistakes I hope they don't make I recalled all the mistakes I had made."

Rickly noted that the end of "Turnpike Divides" has a similar lyrical structure to Shudder to Think's "X-French Tee Shirt." Rickly wanted to do a long, complex circular melody which Fridman noted was similar to what OK Go tried on another song.

Guitarist Tom Keeley has stated that "Past and Future Ruins", and particularly its chorus riff, were influenced by Silversun Pickups.

== Promotion and release ==
Image of the No Devolución limited edition packaging.

In early 2011, Thursday toured North America with Underoath. The tour marked the tenth anniversary for their second studio album Full Collapse, which was performed in its entirety on all dates in celebration. A 7" vinyl split single featuring Underoath's "Paper Lung" from their 2010 album Ø (Disambiguation) and Thursday's "Past and Future Ruins" from their No Devolución was released as a tour-exclusive item in limited quantities. Also during this tour, Thursday held a contest in which six winners were chosen per tour date to preview select songs from No Devolución.

On February 1, 2011, the song "Magnets Caught in a Metal Heart" was digitally previewed via online streaming with a video directed and produced by Davy and Kristin McGuire. Thursday intentionally selected this song to preview first because it was the most radically different song off of No Devolución when compared to their older material. Geoff Rickly described releasing a heavier song as "false advertising," and by releasing "Magnets Caught in a Metal Heart" the group would send the message to their fans: "You're not going to get the record you think you're going to get." The song "Past and Future Ruins" became available for online streaming on February 22, 2011, and "No Answers" became available the following month on March 22.

No Devolución was released on April 12, 2011, through Epitaph Records in CD, 2×LP and digital formats. There was also a limited edition CD version designed by paper craft artist Mia Pearlman, who also created the art that was used for the packaging of the standard releases. The limited edition features layers of solid bleached sulphate paper with a different laser cut design on each layer to where "light will shine through the CD hole." It was limited to 500 pieces and individually hand signed and numbered by Pearlman.

== Reception ==
Professional ratings
Aggregate scores
Source	Rating
Metacritic	88/100
Review scores
Source	Rating
AbsolutePunk	98%
AllMusic	4/5 stars
Alternative Press	4.5/5 stars
The A.V. Club	A−
Billboard	(favorable)
Punknews.org	4/5 stars
Revolver	4/5 stars
Rock Sound	8/10
Spin	8/10
Sputnikmusic	4.5/5 stars

No Devolución received universal critical acclaim. At Metacritic, which assigns a normalized rating out of 100 to reviews from mainstream critics, the album received an average score of 88, indicating "universal acclaim", based on 12 ratings.

Adam Thomas of Sputnikmusic declared that "by combining these previously worked on sounds in new ways Thursday have created an album that is not only new and unique, but also unmistakably their own." Jason Heller of The A.V. Club stated that "No Devolución isn’t a return to form for Thursday; it’s a searing, scarring reinvention."

The album was listed at No. 22 on Sputnikmusic's year-end Staff's Top 50 Albums of 2011.

== Track listing ==
All lyrics are written by Geoff Rickly; all music is composed by Andrew Everding, Tom Keeley, Tim Payne, Steve Pedulla and Tucker Rule.

No.	Title	Length
1.	"Fast to the End"	3:21
2.	"No Answers"	4:53
3.	"A Darker Forest"	3:40
4.	"Sparks Against the Sun"	4:47
5.	"Open Quotes"	2:55
6.	"Past and Future Ruins"	4:15
7.	"Magnets Caught in a Metal Heart"	3:42
8.	"Empty Glass"	4:59
9.	"A Gun in the First Act"	5:02
10.	"Millimeter"	2:48
11.	"Turnpike Divides"	4:54
12.	"Stay True"	7:53
Total length:		53:09

== Personnel ==
No Devolución album personnel adapted from CD liner notes.

Thursday

- Andrew Everding – keyboards
- Tom Keeley – lead guitar
- Tim Payne – bass guitar
- Steve Pedulla – rhythm guitar
- Geoff Rickly – vocals
- Tucker Rule – drums

Additional musicians

- Emily Ruth Everding – trumpet, flugelhorn on "A Gun in the First Act"

Production

- Greg Calbi – mixing
- Andrew Everding – assistant engineering
- Dave Fridmann – production, engineering, mixing

Artwork

- Mia Pearlman – artwork
- Nick Pritchard – design, layout

== Charts ==
Chart performance for No Devolución
Chart (2011)	Peak position
Australian Hitseekers Albums (ARIA)	14
UK Independent Albums (Official Charts)	50
UK Rock & Metal Albums (Official Charts)	36
US Billboard 200	63
US Independent Albums (Billboard)	11
US Top Alternative Albums (Billboard)	10
US Top Rock Albums (Billboard)	19
US Top Tastemaker Albums (Billboard)	6
