= The Blackout Pact =

American post-hardcore band

- Origin: Denver, Colorado
- Genres: Post-hardcore, punk, alternative rock
- Years active: 2003-2006, 2008-2016
- Labels: Eyeball
- Members: Mike Herrera; Cory Trendler; Joe Ramirez; Billy Joe Bailey; Wisam Alshaibi; Seth Piracci
- Past members: Justin Hackl; Ian Johnsen; Mike Delmonico; Nate Reisig

The Blackout Pact was a post-hardcore band from Denver, Colorado. They formed in the early summer of 2003. The band's style was influenced by Hot Water Music, Refused, and Jawbox.

== History ==
The group came together in Denver, but soon after moved to the New York/New Jersey area. In October 2004, Geoff Rickly, who met the group while in a hot dog restaurant in the West Village, signed The Blackout Pact to the indie label Astro Magnetics. Rickly also produced their first album Hello Sailor. They went on to tour with such bands as Fight Paris, Drowningman, The Lawrence Arms, The Fall of Troy, Folly, The Draft, Rise Against, The Number 12 Looks Like You, Yellowcard, Heavy Heavy Low Low, Silverstein, Mae and more. In 2005, they released a video to the song "We Drink So You Don't Have to."

In December 2008, as reported newly on their Myspace site, The Blackout Pact decided to come back from the hiatus and start recording again, with Eyeball Records. The band started recording in January 2009, and the releasing date is expected to be o spring of the same year. The new EP was called Wolves In The Lazarette.

Former frontman Mike Herrera played guitar and shared vocals in a project called Sleeper Horse, which completed a mid-west tour and opened for The Draft, Gaslight Anthem and others before disbanding in 2007. Herrera then shared vocals and played banjo, mandolin and harmonica in the folk/punk outfit Tin Horn Prayer, which released their second LP, Grapple The Rails, via Paper + Plastick in October 2012. Their first album, Get Busy Dying, was released in 2010 on Bermuda Mohawk Productions. Herrera also played guitar in the math rock group, The Lonesome Death of Jordy Verrill.

In 2013, a compilation called Bold Intentions - Demos & Rarities 2005-2009 + Wolves in the Lazarette E.P. was released through the band's Bandcamp page.

On October 6, 2015, Herrera died in his sleep at the age of 33, ending any future plans for The Blackout Pact to continue.

== Band members ==
- Mike Herrera - vocals (died in 2015)
- Cory Trendler - guitar/backing vocals
- Joe Ramirez - guitar
- Billy Joe Bailey - bass/backing vocals
- Wisam Alshaibi - drums
- Seth Piracci - spiritual advisor
- Ian Johnsen - guitar/vocals
- Mike Delmonico - guitar
- Justin Hackl - guitar/vocals
- Nate Reisig

== Discography ==
=== Albums ===
- Hello Sailor (2005, Astro Magnetics)

=== EPs ===
- Wolves in the Lazarette (2009, Eyeball)

=== Singles ===
- "We Drink So You Don't Have To"

=== Compilations ===
- Bold Intentions - Demos & Rarities 2005-2009 + Wolves in the Lazarette E.P. (2013)
