= Live in Nashville =

Live in Nashville may refer to:

- Live in Nashville (King Crimson album)
- Live in Nashville (Demon Hunter album)
- Live in Nashville, 2006 album by Solomon Burke
- Live in Nashville, 2011 video album by Chet Atkins, Jerry Reed and Suzy Bogguss
- Live in Nashville, video album by Waylon Jennings
- Live in Nashville, video album by Stella Parton
- Live in Nashville, video album by Anne McCue
- Live in Nashville, video album by Tammy Wynette
