= Signals Over the Air =

Single by Thursday

from the album War All the Time
- Released: August 12, 2003
- Genre: Post-hardcore; indie rock
- Length: 4:10
- Label: Island
- Songwriters: Tom Keeley, Tim Payne, Steve Pedulla, Geoff Rickly, Tucker Rule

Thursday singles chronology
"For the Workforce, Drowning" (2003)	"Signals Over the Air" (2003)	"Counting 5-4-3-2-1" (2006)

"Signals Over the Air" is a song by American rock band Thursday. It was released on August 12, 2003, as the second single from the band's third studio album War All the Time. It became the band's biggest hit in the United States, reaching No. 30 on the Billboard Alternative Songs chart, as well as in the United Kingdom, where it placed at No. 62 on the UK Singles Chart.

Vocalist Geoff Rickly says he wrote the song about "trying to find [his] own sexual identity" and being uncomfortable with masculinity, as well as the exploitation of sexuality by the media.

== Background ==
Rickly said that the "angles" in the song's guitars were indebted to the album Entertainment! by British band Gang of Four.

During an interview at 2004's Warped Tour, Rickly explained how he felt that the topic of sexuality was a taboo in punk rock and expressed a discomfort with masculinity, saying, "I've never really felt comfortable being a man. I’ve never felt any kind of affinity with male culture." He said that "Signals Over the Air" is "about a lot of gender-related things, but especially sort of trying to come to terms with sexuality as not being a terrible thing, and trying to find my own sexual identity..." He also said the song is "about trying to come to terms with sex not being something that sells beer. And something that’s natural and part of life."

In an interview with New Jersey–based rock publication The Aquarian, Rickly said about the song, "I think that love and sexuality should be together as something really sacred and special. Not how sexuality is just thrown out there as something really commercial and how it’s been made a commodity. Like having sex with someone without knowing who they are or what their life is like and who they have been with."

At a 2024 performance, Rickly dedicated the song to "the human rights of every single person, for reproductive healthcare and reproductive justice for every single person and for the right of every single person to identify with whatever sex, sexuality, gender you see fit."

== Release ==
"Signals Over the Air" was released to radio on August 12, 2003, as the lead radio single and second physical single. According to Rickly, "That was as easy choice for me as a first single. I really like the idea of a song about the exploitation of sexuality being on major media outlets like radio and television. It’s an exploration of how dark sexuality has been made by those forces. It may not be as interesting as 'This Is Radio Clash', but having radio and TV play something that deals with issues of because of radio and TV is something I’m really proud of."

== Chart performance ==
Chart (2003–2004)	Peak position
UK Singles (OCC)	62
US Alternative Airplay (Billboard)	30
