= War All the Time (Thursday album) =

Studio album by Thursday
- Released: September 16, 2003
- Recorded: January–May 2003
- Studio: Big Blue Meenie Recording, Jersey City, New Jersey; Longview Farm, North Brookfield, Massachusetts
- Genre: Post-hardcore; emo
- Length: 41:58
- Label: Island
- Producer: Sal Villanueva

Thursday chronology
Five Stories Falling (2002)	War All the Time (2003)	A City by the Light Divided (2006)

Singles from War All the Time
- 1. "For the Workforce, Drowning" Released: April 28, 2003; 2. "Signals Over the Air" Released: August 12, 2003

War All the Time is the third studio album by American rock band Thursday. Following the release of their second album Full Collapse (2001), the group had a series of negative experiences with their label Victory Records regarding promotion. While this was happening, the group was contacted by major labels, and in May 2002, signed to Island Records. The signing was made official later in the year when an exit agreement was made with Victory Records. In November, the group started writing new material. In January 2003, they began recording their next album with Sal Villanueva at Big Blue Meenie Recording Studios in Jersey City, New Jersey. Sessions lasted six months, aside from a break in April to play shows. In late April, "For the Workforce, Drowning" was released as a single, followed by "Signals Over the Air" in August.

War All the Time was released through Island Records on September 16. Selling 74,000 copies in the first week, the album charted at number seven on the Billboard 200. In addition, it charted within the top 75 in the UK. Following this, keyboardist Andrew Everding, who had performed on a few songs on the album, became a member of the group. The group then went on a short US tour, before embarking on a UK tour. Between October and December, the group went on another US tour, toured with Deftones, and filmed a video for "War All the Time". In early 2004, the group toured Japan, Australia and New Zealand, before supporting AFI in North America in February and March. In April, the band went on another tour and appeared on Warped Tour.

== Background ==
In 2001, Thursday signed to independent label Victory Records. After signing, the band received warnings from their friends that they would find themselves in "a situation that we would regret." The group was unsure what they meant, but thought things would turn out fine due to their contract with the label. They initially thought that part of the contract meant they could sign with a different label if they chose to. However, they realized the deal had in fact stated they could only leave Victory if it was to join a major label, which they thought was "a far-fetched idea to say the least." Later in the year, they released their second album Full Collapse through the label, eventually reaching number 178 on the Billboard 200. Before appearing on Warped Tour, the group visited Victory's offices and learned about Thursday-branded whoopee cushions that the label was planning to sell at the tour. Vocalist Geoff Rickly discussed this matter with Victory founder Tony Brummel, and according to the band, responded that Victory "was a big company and that they didn't have time to run everything by the band." The band were perplexed when the label suggested releasing singles and making music videos, as they felt hardcore bands did not need to do singles and believed they would not appear on radio.

On a number of occasions, the group attempted to have better communication with the label in regards to promotion. On one occasion, Brummel informed them they were not living up to his expectations. Sometime afterwards, the group was touring with Saves the Day. Around this time, Thursday had started writing material for their next album; guitarist Tom Keeley said they had two older songs that were almost close to completion before they had started promoting Full Collapse. Also during this period, Brummel became more positive in his interactions, frequently calling the band "just to say hello, or to ask how record sales at shows were going." The group was disappointed that his positivity "wasn't there from the beginning. ... Instead of Tony's relationship with us being based on a love for music, it was based entirely on numbers." While all the interactions with the label were occurring, the group was being contacted by major labels. The group, who "didn't understand [anything] about major labels", pondered about other independent labels they would join. However, due to their contract they wouldn't be allowed to move to another independent label. Throughout 2001, people from major label Island Records had been to the band's shows since they became a full-time touring act. Soon after, the label expressed interest in signing the band. In February 2002, keyboardist Andrew Everding joined the band.

In late May 2002, the group announced they had signed to Island Records, following a bidding war between other major labels. Victory tried to get the band to sign to a different major label in a deal that would have enabled Victory to serve as a sub-label for them. (Note: In April 2002, it was reported that MCA Records acquired a 25% stake in Victory Records. In October of the same year, it was announced that the deal had fallen apart when Thursday revealed they had signed to Island Records.) Up to this point, Full Collapse had sold 111,000 copies. On September 9, the group's signing to Island Records was made official following negotiations of an exit agreement with Victory Records. The agreement required parent company Island/Def Jam to buy out Victory's contract claim for the group's next two albums. Rickly said as a result of the deal, Victory Records received $1,200,000, which meant the band would be "[paying off] that bill for as long as we were on the new label." In addition, their next two albums were required to feature the Victory logo. With expectation building for their follow-up album, Rickly wanted their next album to be "really aggressive and progressive ... and have all these boundary pushing ideas". In September and October, the group went on the Plea for Peace Tour, and were planning to work on their next album following its conclusion. They said they had accumulated a lot of ideas but were unable to work on them due to touring. In mid-November, the group continued writing new material; over the course of the next two months, they wrote the majority of what would become the album. Up to now, the members had made notes on their laptops and made Pro Tools set-ups in the back of their touring buses to record ideas they had accumulated. While the band did have writer's block, they worked through it as they were short on time.

== Production ==
In January 2003, Kludge reported that Thursday were in the process of recording their next album, which was expected for release in summer or fall. Recording took place at Big Blue Meenie Recording Studios in Jersey City, New Jersey and lasted six months. Though they had thought about working with other producers, they decided to work with Full Collapse producer Sal Villanueva again. Joe Pedulla, Arun Venkatesh, Erin Farley and Villanueva engineered the sessions with assistance from Lee Zappas and Mike LaPierre. With Full Collapse, the band members' home lives felt separate from the recording, according to Rickly. However, for War All the Time, "Life resumed for each of us ... and all the stresses of life came in." He mentioned that some of the members got married, and family members had died. He added, "I feel like all the stress is reflected in the way the album sounds."

Rickly thought they were "doing things that were kind of excessive", mentioning that they recorded four different recordings of every track "just to see which one turned out the best." While this was occurring, the group was writing new material. Rickly said three of these new songs would not have been tracked had they not had the time, specifically mentioning "Division St." and "Signals Over the Air". Villanueva noticed the group getting burned out and took them to a farmhouse studio, which was Longview Farm Studios in North Brookfield, Massachusetts. Rickly said it was located in the "woods, basically it’s a log cabin with a fireplace, it’s just really beautiful." The studio had a grand piano on which the group fleshed out a piano part that Everding had previously written. Rickly said Everding repeatedly played the part and recorded it. The group took a break from recording to play a few shows in late April.

While working on lyrics for the final three songs, he was unable to write any words and became unhappy with the songs. He subsequently suffered from writer's block for a month. Rickly said that after recording was completed, the rest of the band wrote three more songs, which they "liked even better". The label gave the band money to record the new tracks; sessions continued into May 2003. The recordings were mixed by Rumblefish with assistance from Coady Brown, and then mastered by Bob Ludwig at Gateway Mastering in Portland Maine. Everding played keyboards on "Division St.", "Marches and Maneuvers", "Asleep in the Chapel", "This Song Brought to You by a Falling Bomb", "Steps Ascending", "M. Shepard" and "Tomorrow I'll Be You". Tim Gilles played keyboards on "Between Rupture and Rapture" and "Signals Over the Air". Gretta Cohn of Cursive and Jonah Matranga of Onelinedrawing appeared on "Steps Ascending", providing cello and vocals respectively. Arun Venkatesh performed programming on "M. Shepard". Keri Levens, Marc Meltser and Dave Ciancio provided vocals on "War All the Time".

== Composition ==
=== Overview ===
All of the music was written by Thursday except for "This Song Brought to You by a Falling Bomb", which was co-written between Everding and the band. All of the lyrics were written by Geoff Rickly. The material on Full Collapse was written over a two-year period, while for War All the Time, the tracks were done in two months. During this time period, they spent every day working on songs from 11AM to 8PM. Guitarist Steve Pedulla said they expanded further on ideas from Full Collapse, in addition to channelling the music they were listening to. He explained that what someone listens to can influence their playing, and despite the group listening to "a lot of mellower stuff", the music came out "a lot heavier". While on tour, they listened to Godspeed You! Black Emperor and Mogwai. Prior to the album, the group was asked if it would sound closer to "Jet Black New Year", a track Pedulla called "the heaviest song we wrote". Pedulla and Keeley initially denied it; the former stated that the song was a direction they "went for a little while, and we are going somewhere else now." Keeley added that it "definitely runs thematically" throughout War All the Time.

Speaking of the title, Rickly said: "I think a title like War All the Time for a record about love seems to demonstrate what our band is about — that balance between violence and grace." He added that he had been "afraid to talk about the idea of romantic love in songs because I feel like it's such a cliché". Rickly got the notion of tackling romance from writer Charles Bukowski, who wrote a poem where the album took its title from. He said it soon became a substantial part of his life, and he "felt like I was stifling myself by not writing about it." Discussing the lack of hooks on the album, Rickly said "When you write music, you hear what you've done, and you immediately find what you're missing with what you did." He added, "If this were a really hooky record, I'd say it weren't complex enough." Musically, the album's sound has been classified as post-hardcore, emo and scene music.

=== Songs ===
Rickly compared "For the Workforce, Drowning" to a "super heavy" Fugazi. "Division St." describes an evening in which Rickly visited a group of his friends. Upon learning they were using heavy drugs, he left and was mugged and stabbed in the leg. When he went to visit a girl he liked for help, he found out she was with someone else. He said the track was about how "it can sometimes seem like your whole world is coming apart and you find out that everything you thought you knew is not how you thought it was." The music for the song was influenced by Sigur Rós. When Rickly showed the song to the rest of the group, they were only partially interested in it. After they saw Sigur Rós at a concert, they "decided to bring in some of their noisy qualities into our music", according to Rickly. Rickly said "Signals Over the Air" comments on mass media's "exploitation of sexuality" and his own relationship with sexuality, which he has "always kind of had issues with" to the point "where it always seemed very predatory to me". "Marches and Maneuvers" talks about Rickly and his ex-girlfriend's opinions on abortion and children. He said it "addresses living together and having all those pressures, and then eventually blaming each other for things that happen". Discussing "This Song Brought to You by a Falling Bomb", Rickly said he had "this feeling of wanting to escape the outside world and escape the news." He added that, "On the news every day there would be all these things about the war going on and that terrified me ... It gave an impulse for me to want to block it out." It was intended to solely be an instrumental interlude; however, Rickly "kept hearing things", and asked Everding if it was alright to sing over it.

Referring to the title-track, Rickly said they had the phrase War All the Time as the album title first before it appeared in the song. He said that it wasn't the first title they had in mind, but soon realized that the song "really is the center of the record." Rickly said the song was about his upbringing in New Jersey. He added that it was "sort of like love all the time, and the price of trying to have love all the time." The song talks about three important occasions in Rickly's life, which he attempted to model it after Magnolia (1999). The first part details moving to a town where one of his friends' brothers fell off a cliffside, and some of his friends subsequently committed suicide. The second part discusses Rickly discovering music, and the third part talks about love and how that can affect a person's sense of self and confidence. The rhythm and melody of the song came out during a soundcheck. Keeley was playing a part repeatedly and drummer Tucker Rule joined playing a variety of beats. Pedulla then began playing along, playing what Rickly called "these beautiful, glistening guitar parts". Rickly said "M. Shepard" was "not directly" about Matthew Shepard, but also about his friend who was afraid to come out and "how complex sexuality is". "Tomorrow I'll Be You" was originally going to be the opening track as the group adored the song. However, they soon realized that it "didn't seem right to have this redeeming, beautiful" track began an album that had a "lot of ugliness and darkness in it." It initially started out as an ending to "Jet Black New Year", as it was a "redemption for that song in a lot of ways."

== Release ==
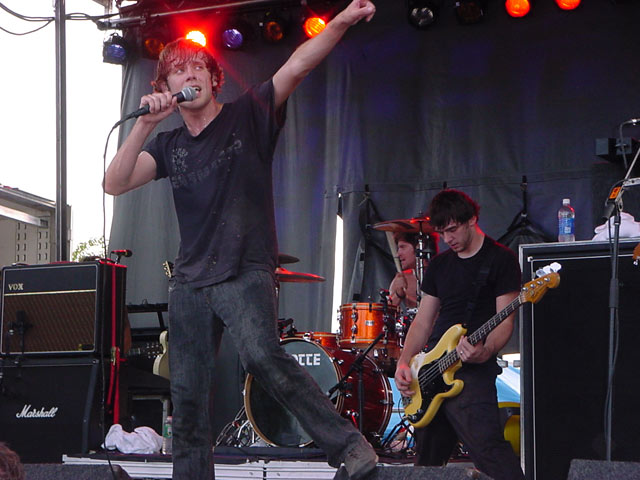
Vocalist Geoff Rickly, bassist Tim Payne and drummer Tucker Rule performing on Warped Tour, July 31, 2004

Keeley said that upon showing their label the album, he was unsure how they would react to it. He said that "for the most part it was a very positive" reaction. On March 25, 2003, War All the Time was announced for release in August. On April 28, "For the Workforce, Drowning" was released as a single; around this, the band performed at Skate and Surf Fest. In June and July, the group toured the US alongside Rival Schools, This Day Forward, Murder by Death and Every Time I Die. In addition, they performed at the Field Day and Hellfest festivals. "For the Workforce, Drowning" was released on a split 7-inch vinyl record with "Under a Killing Moon" by Thrice on July 1. Following this, the band took a two-week break, their first since November 2002, and then spent the next four weeks rehearsing. "Signals Over the Air" was released to radio on August 12. Having the song as a single, Rickly said he "like[d] the idea of a song about the exploitation of sexuality being on major media outlets like radio and television." The music video for the track, released on August 28, was directed by Joakim Åhlund. Initially announced for release on August 19, the album's release was delayed so that the group could record new material. War All the Time was eventually released on September 16 through Island Records. It was previously made available for streaming nine days prior to release. The UK version of the album was released through Mercury Records. The Japanese version included a cover of Sigur Rós' "Ný batterí" (2000) as a bonus track. Bassist Tim Payne said they were listening to that band's Ágætis byrjun (1999) album when he suggested Thursday should cover one of their songs.

Later in September, the group went on a brief tour of North America with Year of the Rabbit and Death by Stereo. In October, the group went on a UK tour with Coheed and Cambria and Further Seems Forever. In October and November, the group went on a tour of North America with Thrice and Coheed and Cambria. On October 31, the band performed on The Late Late Show. Following this, the group toured with Deftones until early December. On December 15, a music video was filmed for "War All the Time" in New Jersey with director Marc Klasfeld. Jon Wiederhorn of MTV said the video uses "war-coverage techniques to create an atmosphere of extreme urgency" and "infrared and green night-vision filters to imitate war footage". Some of the scenes in the video were styled after films by Godfrey Reggio: Koyaanisqatsi (1983), Powaqqatsi (1988), and Naqoyqatsi (2002). In January 2004, the group went on a tour of Japan, followed by appearances at Big Day Out in New Zealand and Australia. Following this, the group supported AFI on their North American tour in February and March, and played a handful of shows with the Bronx, Head Automatica, and Piebald. A tour with Poison the Well, Engine Down, and Spitalfield started in April, which lead into an appearance on the main stage at the Warped Tour. A music video was released for "For the Workforce, Drowning" on June 18, 2004, directed by Pedulla and filmed on the tour with Poison the Well. They supported the Cure on their US tour in July and August 2004, and appeared at Strhessfest.

== Reception ==
Professional ratings
Review scores
Source	Rating
AllMusic	4/5 stars
Blender	4/5 stars
Christgau's Consumer Guide	(dud)
Drowned in Sound	5/10
Entertainment Weekly	A−
IGN	6.8/10
Kludge	7/10
Q	3/5 stars
Rolling Stone	3/5 stars
Spin	A

=== Critical response ===
Critics gave the album a varied response. AllMusic reviewer Johnny Loftus wrote that the record "rocks on the dynamics between singing and screaming, between rage unleashed and thoughts cast inward." He also said that in spite of the album's "righteous gospel, startling dynamic shifts, and hurtling minor-chord choruses", it unavoidably starts to "resemble one long, 40-minute song." CMJ New Music Report's Amy Sciarretto compared the band to Bruce Springsteen in that they use "vivid detail and gruff emotion to paint pictures that aren't beautiful". She mentioned that the tracks were "more like emotional earthquakes than songs, making an album for today's youth looking to art for salvation and survival." Drowned in Sound writer James Parrish said the album, when compared to Full Collapse, "falls flat on its face through trying too hard." He added that the melodies were "haphazard and overtly awkward and the instrumentation, while competent and intricate, is nothing you couldn't hear" before on Full Collapse.

Contactmusic.com reviewer Mark Danson wrote "there's just nothing special here, either in the playing, writing or the production." He also said the group's "only saving grace" was "their vocalist 'sounds-a-bit-like-the-guy-from-The-Cure'." In a review for Entertainment Weekly, Greg Kot called the album "[s]ensitive as a teardrop, but hitting with the impact of a two-by-four across the jaw", adding that it gave "good elegy with its mix of emo-punk sincerity and metal-tinged-roar." Stuart Green of Exclaim! said the album "suffer[s] the same terminal fate" as the group's contemporaries – "one of tedious sameness ... [happy to] rehash the stuff they've done in the past." IGN's Jesse Lord said it was a "really good CD that verges on being great", however, "there are simply too many songs that sound alike." He noted that while the intros on the majority of the songs reveal "the diversity of the band", they then revert to "the screaming and the overdriven guitars." Ink19 reviewer Daniel L. Mitchell gave a very positive review of the album, praising the writing (especially "Division St.", "For The Workforce, Drowning" and "M. Shepard") and production on the record. Mitchell also appreciated "This Song Brought to You by a Falling Bomb", despite that in his opinion, it "should, in theory, suck". He concluded, "War All The Time is "emo" done correctly, and while others will try to copy it, they will undoubtedly fail."

Kludge magazine reflected positively on War All the Time, with reviewer Adam Newman stating "The CD is truly commanding as its abrupt and urgent conclusions are as nicely inserted as the dramatic ups and downs of the chorus." Newman chose "Division St." and "Signals Over the Air" as highlights from the album. Melodic writer Kaj Roth said the group lacked "the same heavyweight production" as contemporary act From Autumn to Ashes, and that the songs felt like "an enduro to get through". Punknews.org founder Aubin Paul wrote that a "leap in songwriting prowess is apparent" in a number of tracks where "things are more toned down, but the dynamic range is clearly larger." Music critic Robert Christgau gave the album a "dud". Music journalist Christian Hoard wrote that, in a review for Rolling Stone, the album "brims over with all the jagged guitars and bad thoughts a bunch of suburban New Jersey kids can muster." He also said that the group created an album that was "desperate and intense enough to resonate outside their corner of the underground." Spin's Andrew Beaujon said Rickly "sings like Ben Folds after a particularly messy breakup", and manages to fill the beginning "moment [of each song] with starved romanticism." Beaujon mentioned that the record's "artier tracks ... will probably enervate longtime fans who worry that major-label cash is clouding their heroes’ worldview."

=== Commercial performance and legacy ===
The album sold over 74,000 copies, giving the band their best sales week. It charted at number seven on the Billboard 200 in the process. In the UK, it charted at number 62. By April 2004, the album had sold 259,000 copies and 355,000 copies by mid-2006. As of April 2007, it had sold 364,000 copies. "Signals Over the Air" charted at number 30 on the Alternative Songs chart in the US, and at number 62 in the UK. Drowned in Sound included it on their top albums of 2003 list, while Exclaim! ranked it at number two on their Best Punk Album of the year list behind Scandinavian Leather by Turbonegro.

In a retrospective review for Sputnikmusic in 2008, staff member Davey Boy said it was "rather inconsistent, but gets by on its highlights and its ability to grow on the listener over time" and in "an attempt at crossover appeal, this release is only partially successful." In 2014, Rickly was asked to rank the band's albums and discuss his thoughts on them. He listed War All the Time at number four, saying that he hated the album upon release. He then added, "In retrospect I think that's a mistake. I think it’s a really cool record". They performed the album in its entirety in October 2009, while in the midst of promoting their fifth studio album, Common Existence. From April 2018 to December 2019, the group performed a run of two-night shows where they played Full Collapse on the first night, and War All the Time on the other, in their entirety.

== Track listing ==
All music written by Thursday except "This Song Brought to You by a Falling Bomb", which was written by Andrew Everding and Thursday. All lyrics written by Geoff Rickly.

1. "For the Workforce, Drowning" – 3:16
2. "Between Rupture and Rapture" – 3:03
3. "Division St." – 4:14
4. "Signals Over the Air" – 4:10
5. "Marches and Maneuvers" – 4:27
6. "Asleep in the Chapel" – 3:46
7. "This Song Brought to You by a Falling Bomb" – 2:16
8. "Steps Ascending" – 4:26
9. "War All the Time" – 4:33
10. "M. Shepard" – 3:36
11. "Tomorrow I'll Be You" – 4:07

Japanese bonus track

12. "Ný batterí" (Sigur Rós cover) – 6:34

== Personnel ==
Personnel per booklet.

Thursday

- Geoff Rickly – lead vocals
- Tucker Rule – drums, backing vocals
- Tom Keeley – lead guitar, backing vocals
- Tim Payne – bass, backing vocals
- Steve Pedulla – rhythm guitar, backing vocals

Additional musicians

- Andrew Everding – keyboards (tracks 3, 5–8, 10 and 11)
- Tim Giles – keyboards (tracks 2 and 4)
- Gretta Cohn – cello (track 8)
- Jonah Matranga – vocals (track 8)
- Keri Levens – vocals (track 9)
- Arun Venkatesh – programming (track 10)
- Marc Meltser – backing vocals (track 9)
- Dave Ciancio – backing vocals (track 9)

Production

- Sal Villanueva – producer, engineer
- Rumblefish – mixing
- Coady Brown – assistant
- Joe Pedulla – engineering
- Arun Venkatesh – engineering
- Erin Farley – engineering
- Lee Zappas – assistant
- Mike LaPierre – assistant
- Bob Ludwig – mastering
- Morning Breath Inc. – art direction, illustration, design
- Ken Schles – photography

== Charts ==
Chart performance for War All the Time
Chart (2003–2004)	Peak position
Australian Hitseekers Albums (ARIA)	11
Canadian Albums (Nielsen SoundScan)	31
Scottish Albums (Official Charts)	89
UK Albums (OCC)	62
UK Rock & Metal Albums (Official Charts)	7
US Billboard 200	7
