= Thursday / Envy =

EP (split) by Thursday & Envy
- Released: November 4, 2008
- Recorded: Spring 2008
- Genres: Post-hardcore, post-rock, screamo
- Length: 33:42
- Label: Temporary Residence
- Producer: Tim Giles

Thursday chronology
Kill the House Lights (2007)	Thursday / Envy (2008)	Common Existence (2009)

Envy chronology
Envy/Jesu (2008)	Thursday / Envy (2008)	Recitation (2010)

Professional ratings
Review scores
Source	Rating
Alt Press	4.5/5 stars
ChartAttack	4.5/5 stars
A Distorted Reality	4.5/5 stars
NME	(8/10)
Sputnikmusic	3.5/5 stars
Tiny Mix Tapes	3.5/5 stars

Thursday / Envy is a split EP by post-hardcore bands Thursday and Envy. It was released exclusively in a package containing the album on both 180 gram 12" vinyl and on CD — individual CDs or vinyl have not been made available. Three limited screen printed editions have been made available exclusively through web stores as of September 15, 2008. The album has since seen a limited release in cassette format, all 500 copies of which were sold exclusively through independent record label, Academy Fight Song's web store.

== Track listing ==
=== Side A: Thursday ===
All songs written by Thursday.

1. "As He Climbed the Dark Mountain" – 3:03
2. "In Silence" – 4:42
3. "An Absurd and Unrealistic Dream of Peace" – 4:13
4. "Appeared and Was Gone" (Remix of "In Silence" by Anthony Molina of Mercury Rev) – 5:59

=== Side B: Envy ===
All songs written by Envy, except for track 1 written by Shido from Metalpark and Envy.

1. "An Umbrella Fallen into Fiction" – 6:28
2. "Isolation of a Light Source" – 3:40
3. "Pure Birth and Loneliness" – 5:40

== Personnel ==
=== Thursday ===
- Geoff Rickly – vocals
- Tom Keeley – guitar, vocals
- Steve Pedulla – guitar, vocals
- Tim Payne – bass guitar
- Tucker Rule – drums
- Andrew Everding – keyboards, synthesizers, vocals
- Produced and mixed by Tim Giles
- Assisted mixing by Matt Messenger
- Recorded by Kevin Neaton
- Mastered by Alan Douches

=== Envy ===
- Tetsuya Fukagawa – vocals, sequencer
- Nobukata Kawai – guitar
- Masahiro Tobita – guitar
- Manabu Nakagawa – bass guitar
- Dairoku Seki – drums
- Recorded and mixed by Takashi "Patch" Kitaguchi
- Mastered by Tucky

=== Album personnel ===
- Vinyl mastered by Paul Gold
- Art direction, design, and layout by Jeremy deVine
- Illustrations by Dan Grzeca
