= Live in Detroit, MI =

Live album by King Crimson
- Released: October 2001
- Recorded: November 13, 1971
- Venue: Eastown Theatre, Detroit, Michigan, United States
- Genre: Progressive rock
- Label: Discipline Global Mobile
- Producer: David Singleton and Alex R. Mundy

King Crimson Collector's Club chronology
Live in Northampton, MA (2001)	Live in Detroit, MI (2001)	Live in Nashville, TN (2002)

Professional ratings
Review scores
Source	Rating
Allmusic	4/5 stars

Live in Detroit, MI is a live album (2-CD set) by the band King Crimson, released through the King Crimson Collector's Club in October 2001. The album was recorded in Detroit, Michigan at the Eastown Theatre on 13 November 1971 although the packaging erroneously gives the month as December. It also erroneously lists the second track on Disc 2 as "Mars" when it should be "The Devil's Triangle".

The album includes liner notes by the band's drummer, Ian Wallace.

== Track listing ==
=== Disc 1 ===
1. "Pictures of a City" (Fripp, Sinfield) – 9:02
2. "Formentera Lady" (Fripp, Sinfield) – 9:08
3. "Sailor's Tale" (Fripp) – 5:59
4. "Cirkus" (Fripp, Sinfield) – 9:14
5. "Ladies of the Road" (incomplete) (Fripp, Sinfield) – 7:54
6. "Groon" (incomplete) (Fripp) – 17:49

=== Disc 2 ===
1. "21st Century Schizoid Man" (Fripp, McDonald, Lake, Giles, Sinfield) – 13:21
2. "The Devil's Triangle" (Fripp, McDonald) – 13:22
3. "The Court of the Crimson King" (McDonald, Sinfield) – 3:31
4. "Lady of the Dancing Water" (incomplete) (Fripp, Sinfield) – 2:25

== Personnel ==
King Crimson

- Robert Fripp – electric guitar, Mellotron, Hohner Pianet
- Mel Collins – saxophone, flute, Mellotron
- Boz Burrell – bass guitar, lead vocals
- Ian Wallace – drums, percussion, backing vocals
- Peter Sinfield – live sound mixing, VCS3, stage lighting

Production personnel

- Alex R. Mundy – digital editing
- David Singleton – mastering
- Robert Ellis – photography
- Hugh O'Donnell – design

== Notes ==
The audience link after "Pictures of a City" has been repaired. A few obvious faults remain. The introduction to "Ladies of the Road" is missing, and there is a break in the middle of "Groon", where the original tapes were changed. "Lady Of The Dancing Water" remains an incomplete fragment.
