= Gatherers (band) =

American post-hardcore band

- Also known as: Gatherer (2011–2015)
- Origin: Bayonne, New Jersey, U.S.
- Genres: Post-hardcore; melodic hardcore; screamo (early)
- Years active: 2011–present
- Labels: Equal Vision; No Sleep
- Members: Adam Cichocki; Rich Weinberger; Anthony Gesa; Rob Talalai; Siddhu Anandalingam
- Past members: Matt Popowski; Zach Crockett; Austin Lipinski; Justin Cosentino; Randy LeBoeuf; Gianmarco Felix Guerra-Coletti; Christian Berrigan
- Website: gatherersband.com

Gatherers (formerly known as Gatherer) is an American post-hardcore band from Bayonne, New Jersey. Founded in 2011, Gatherers has released four full-length albums, one single, one EP, and one live release. In 2015, they signed to Equal Vision Records.

== History ==
The band formed in 2011 in Bayonne, New Jersey, because Austin Lipinski wished to play one show in a band before he joined the navy. The band's founding lineup was Lipinski on guitar, along with bassist Matt Popowski and drummer Adam Cichocki (formerly of Goodnight Bravado), vocalist Christian Berrigan (formerly of Misspent Youth) and guitarist Justin Cosentino (formerly of Number 23). They originally used the name Gatherer, which came from a discussion in their Whatsapp group chat, where Berrigan wrote a possible name but it autocorrected to "gatherer". Following their sole intended show, Lipinski decided not to join the navy, and the members began to focus on the band.

They self-released their debut EP entitled Postcards in March 2012, with a vinyl release coming soon after in June via Glass Nail Records, which consisted of four songs. Cosentino was briefly replaced by Randy LeBoeuf, who was then replaced by Gianmarco Felix Guerra-Coletti.

Due to the closure of Glass Nail Records, they self-released their first full-length album entitled Caught Between a Rock and a Sad Place in June 2013. Shortly after this release, Berrigan announced his departure from the band in a Facebook post.

Vocalist Rich Weinberger joined the band in 2014 to fill the gap left behind by Berrigan. In March 2015, they released a single entitled God Deluxe, which contained a song of the same name to build hype for their second full-length album, Quiet World, Shortly after the single's release, they changed their name to Gatherers. They released Quiet World in July of that same year. The band appeared on WSOU and described the writing process as visual and driven by the way things sound (e.g. digging in dirt). In support of the album, the band embarked on the Common Vision Tour with Every Time I Die and Gnarwolves. After these releases, guitarist Gianmarco Felix Guerra-Coletti left the band.

In June 2016, the band made an appearance on Audiotree Live, wherein the band played songs from their previously released material and one new song. This doubled as a live release, which was released digitally.

After the departure of guitarist Austin Lipinski, the band gained guitarists Anthony Gesa and Rob Talalai. In June 2018, they released their third full-length album entitled We Are Alive Beyond Repair and embarked on a summer USA tour with Bent Knee.

On April 16, 2019, Gatherers released a new single called "Sick, Sad Heart" in the build up to their first European tour.

Via Flood Magazine on April 30, 2020, the band released a new single entitled "Ad Nauseam, I Drown" from their forthcoming fourth LP. They also announced that they have changed record labels and are now on No Sleep Records.

On November 18, 2022 Gatherers released their fourth studio album: (mutilator.)

== Musical style ==
Gatherers's earliest music was screamo, in a manner remisicent to the bands involved in the wave. They cited Touché Amoré as an influence. Around 2015, the band underwent a sonic shift, playing what critics categorized as melodic hardcore and post-hardcore. During this time, their influences included Thursday, Glassjaw, Deftones, the Appleseed Cast, the Casket Lottery, Drive Like Jehu, Quicksand, At the Drive-In, Metz, Radiohead, Nine Inch Nails, Envy on the Coast and Interpol.

They have been cited as an influence by Casey.

== Band Members ==
Current members

Name	Instrument	Years
Rich Weinberger	lead vocals	2014–present
Anthony Gesa	guitar	2017–present
Rob Talalai	guitar	2017–present
Siddhu Anandalingam	bass	2020–present
Adam Cichocki	drums	2011–present

Past members

Name	Instrument	Years
Christian Berrigan	lead vocals	2011-2013
Austin Lipinski	guitar	2011-2016
Gianmarco Felix Guerra-Coletti	guitar	2012-2015
Justin Cosentino	guitar	2011-2012
Zach Crockett	bass	2019
Matt Popowski	bass	2011–2019

Live musicians

Name	Instrument	Years
Randy LeBoeuf	guitar	2012
Zach Hudson	guitar, vocals	2016

Timeline

== Discography ==
Studio albums

Year	Title	Label
2013	Caught Between a Rock and a Sad Place	Driftwood Records
2015	Quiet World	Equal Vision Records / Driftwood Records
2018	We Are Alive Beyond Repair	Equal Vision Records / Driftwood Records
2022	(mutilator.)	No Sleep Records

EPs and singles

Year	Title	Label
2012	Postcards	Glass Nail Records
2015	God Deluxe	Equal Vision Records
2020	Ad Nauseam, I Drown	No Sleep Records
2020	Massalette/Sick, Sad Heart	No Sleep Records

Live

Year	Title	Label
2016	Gatherers - Audiotree Live	Audiotree

Videos

Year	Song	Release
2012	"Wedding Bells"	Postcards
2015	"God Deluxe"	Quiet World
2015	"A Recluse (On 8mm Film)"	Quiet World
2015	"Ritual Flowers"	Quiet World
2018	"The Flooboards Are Breathing"	We Are Alive Beyond Repair
2018	"Infinity and Gloom"	We Are Alive Beyond Repair
