= Geoff Rickly =

American musician (born 1979)

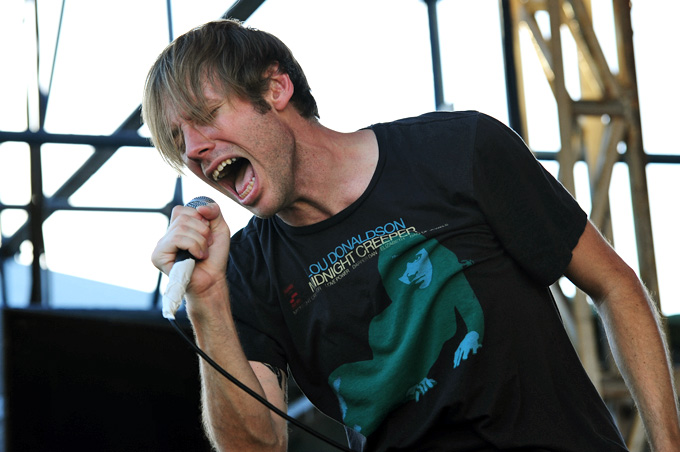
- Rickly performing with Thursday in March 2012

Background information
- Born: Geoffrey William Rickly; March 8, 1979 (age 47); Providence, Rhode Island, U.S.
- Origin: Dumont, New Jersey, U.S.
- Genres: Post-hardcore; post-punk; alternative rock; emo; indie rock; screamo; hardcore punk
- Occupations: Singer; songwriter; record producer
- Years active: 1998–present
- Member of: Ink & Dagger; Thursday; United Nations; Useless; Strangelight; No Devotion

Geoffrey William Rickly (born March 8, 1979) is an American musician, best known as the lead vocalist and songwriter of rock band Thursday. He is also a member of hardcore punk band United Nations and the alternative rock group No Devotion with former members of Lostprophets, and is the founder of the label Collect Records. In 2023, his debut novel, Someone Who Isn't Me, was published by Rose Books.

== Personal life ==
Rickly was born in Providence, Rhode Island and raised in Dumont, New Jersey, into a Catholic family, and attended Dumont High School, where he was a member of the band and played the tenor sax. He attended Rutgers University until 2000 before dropping out to pursue music. Rickly is a diagnosed epileptic, which has affected his ability to tour.

In early 2013, Rickly was mugged in New York City, where his cell phone, iPad, wallet, credit card, rent money, and medication were stolen. In 2015, Rickly was poisoned and robbed in Hamburg, Germany, while touring with No Devotion to play at the Reeperbahn Festival. Rickly was hospitalized, causing them to cancel their concert, but recovered for a scheduled show in Paris the following day.

In a 2017 interview with Spin, Rickly spoke of battling a heroin addiction that began shortly after Thursday's breakup in 2011. Following Thursday's reunion in 2016, Rickly was inspired to quit using the drug. In 2023, Rickly released his first novel, Someone Who Isn't Me, via Rose Books. The novel is an autofictional account of his struggles with heroin addiction and experimental psychedelic treatment with Ibogaine.

Rickly lives with his partner, Liza de Guia.

== Career ==
Rickly has contributed guest vocals to many songs, including My American Heart's "We Are the Fabrication", Murder by Death's "Killbot 2000", This Day Forward's "Sunfalls and Watershine", Circa Survive's "The Lottery", and My Chemical Romance's "This Is the Best Day Ever". He also occasionally performs solo, most recently opening for Anthony Green on his tour "This Tour Won't Save You" from July 23rd through to August 7th, 2026.

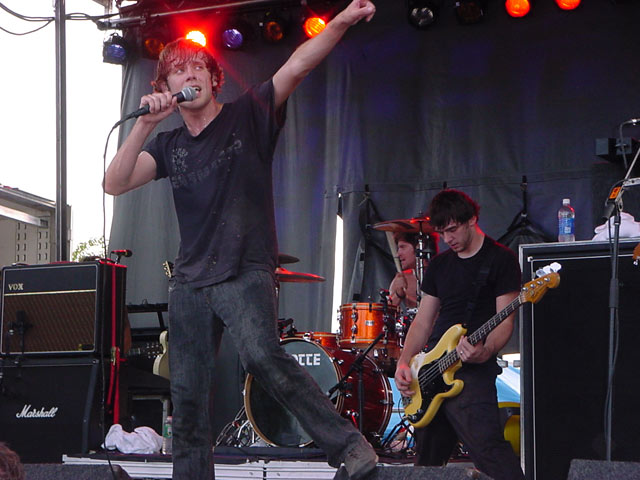
Rickly performing with Thursday in 2004

Lyrically, Rickly has been known to draw from a wide variety of influences, many of them being authors and poets. In a March 2009 interview, he cited the works of Denis Johnson, Martin Amis, Roberto Bolaño and David Foster Wallace as being among his influences for the lyrics of Thursday's Common Existence album, which was released in February 2009. A tattoo on his forearm reads "love is love", a lyric from the band Frail; Rickly adopted these lyrics into Thursday's "A Hole in the World". The band's song "Autobiography of a Nation" is clearly influenced by poet Michael Palmer's "Sun". Rickly has also written, recorded and played for United Nations, an experimental powerviolence collaboration.

In 2014, after Lostprophets disbanded following the conviction of frontman Ian Watkins for multiple sexual offences, the remaining members (Stuart Richardson, Lee Gaze, Luke Johnson, Mike Lewis and Jamie Oliver) formed a new band with Rickly, No Devotion. The band have released two albums, Permanence (2015) and No Oblivion (2022).

=== Collect Records ===
In 2009, Rickly formed Collect Records, a record label which in its early years only co-released various albums, including releases by Touché Amoré, United Nations and Midnight Masses, but in 2014, the label announced plans to be the primary label behind albums by Black Clouds, Vanishing Life, Sick Feeling and No Devotion.

==== Martin Shkreli controversy ====
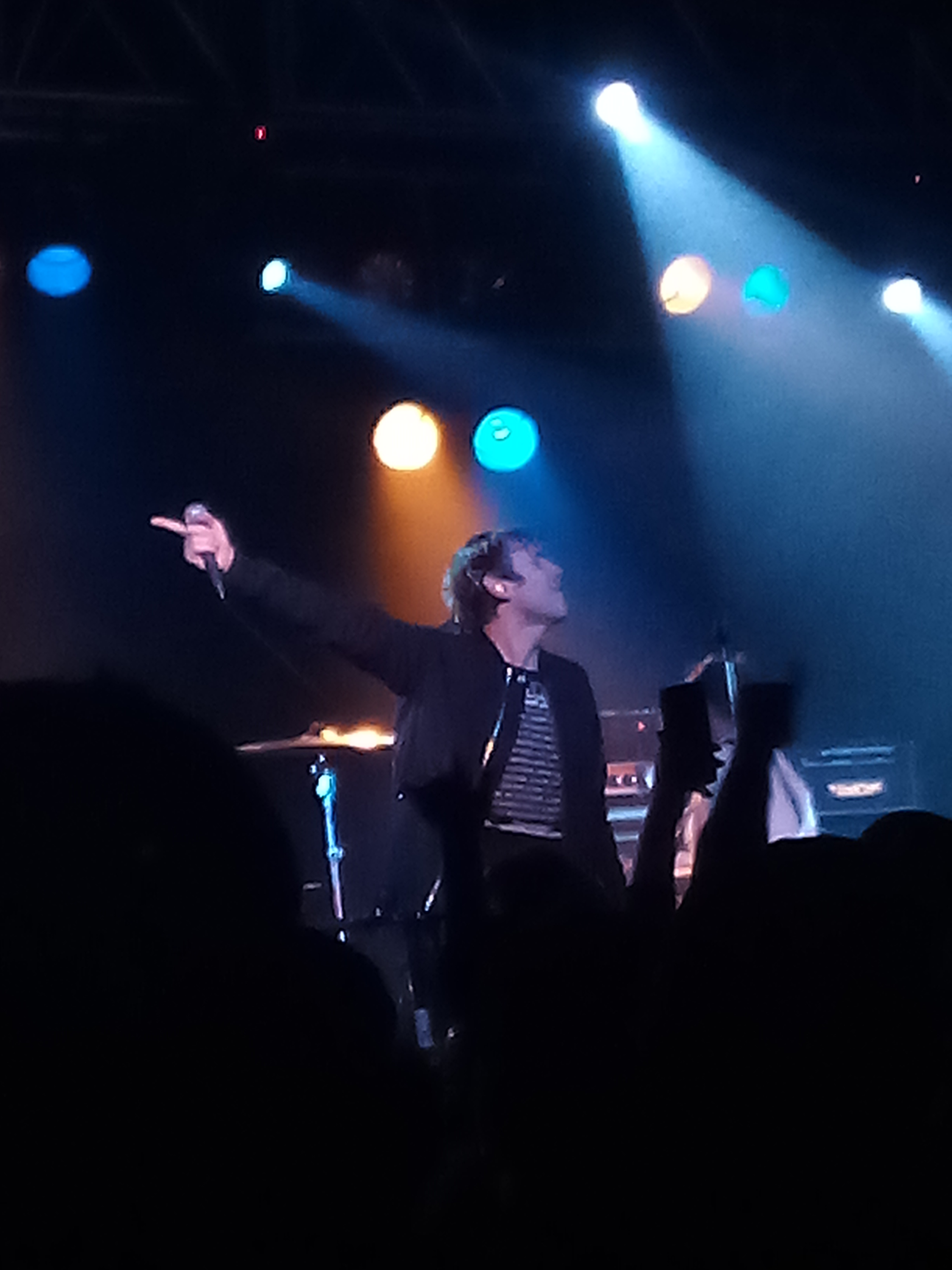
Rickly performing with Thursday in 2022

During the 2015 public scandal of hedge fund manager Martin Shkreli and his controversial monetary inflation of toxoplasmosis-related pharmaceuticals, it was revealed that Shkreli was a silent investor in Collect Records, while still allowing Rickly to retain creative control. Rickly and Shkreli met when the guitar that Rickly used to make Thursday's album Full Collapse was purchased by Shkreli for $10,000. Rickly said he was completely shocked by the scandal, stating: "I've seen the guy give away money to schools, charities, and frankly, our bands, who if anyone really knows the industry, is a hard sell. I am struggling to find how this is OK." Due to the controversy, Shkreli's relationship with Collect Records angered several artists signed to the label. One of the artists, Sick Feeling, said in a public statement: "One thing is clear; as long as he has a part in the label, we, Sick Feeling, cannot. Our experience with Geoff, Norm, and Shaun has been nothing but positive, however, we cannot continue to work with Collect as long as Martin Shkreli has any part in it." Dominic "Nicky" Palermo of Nothing, who had just recently signed a two-record deal with Collect Records, expressed interest in ending the contract and said: "I'm hoping that we can just get out of this with someone else and not have to go down whatever ugly road that could lead to." Within two days of the controversy, Rickly put out a press release stating that the label had severed its relationship with Shkreli. He stated that, now lacking Shkreli's significant financial contributions to Collect (estimated to be "somewhere around a million dollars"), he could not cover Collect Records' outstanding invoices with just the money he had in the bank, leaving its future uncertain.

== Discography ==
=== As band member ===
==== Thursday ====
- Waiting (1999, Eyeball)
- Full Collapse (2001, Victory)
- Five Stories Falling (2002, Victory)
- War All the Time (2003, Island)
- Live from the SoHo & Santa Monica Stores (2003, Island)
- Live in Detroit (2003, Island)
- A City by the Light Divided (2006, Island)
- Kill the House Lights (2007, Victory)
- Thursday / Envy (2008, Temporary Residence)
- Common Existence (2009, Epitaph)
- No Devolución (2011, Epitaph)

==== United Nations ====
- United Nations (2008, Eyeball)
- Never Mind the Bombings, Here's Your Six Figures (2010, Deathwish)
- The Next Four Years (2014, Temporary Residence)

==== Solo ====
- Mixtape 1 (2012, self-released)
- Darker Matter/// Mixtape 2 (2013, self-released)

==== Strangelight ====
- 9 Days (2013, Sacrament)

==== No Devotion ====
- Permanence (2015, Collect)
- No Oblivion (2022, Velocity)

=== As guest member ===
Year	Artist	Album	Song	Ref
2002	My Chemical Romance	I Brought You My Bullets, You Brought Me Your Love	"This Is the Best Day Ever"	
2002	This Day Forward	Kairos	"Sunfalls and Watershine"	
2003	Murder by Death	Who Will Survive, and What Will Be Left of Them?	"Killbot 2000"	
2003	Stretch Arm Strong	Engage		
2005	The Blackout Pact	Hello Sailor		
2005	My American Heart	The Meaning in Makeup	"We Are the Fabrication"	
2008	Players Club	"Coextinction"		
2009	Touché Amoré	...To the Beat of a Dead Horse	"History Reshits Itself"	
2012	Circa Survive	Violent Waves	"The Lottery"	
2013	Man Overboard	Heart Attack	"Open Season"	
2020	Cremation Lily	"Light Gathers in the Corners of the Room, Pt. II"	"More Songs About Drowning"	
2022	Vein.fm	This World Is Going to Ruin You	"Fear In Non Fiction"	
2022	Gatherers	"( mutilator. )"	"Gift Horse"	
2023	The HIRS Collective	"We're Still Here"	"So, Anyway"	
2023	triton.	"Sundown in Oaktown"	"alcatraz_"	
2023	Sharkswimmer	"Serenity"	"Demolition of a Childhood Home"	
2024	Common Sage	Nostos | Algos	"Edin"	
2025	A Lot Like Birds	"When In Love" ft. Geoff Rickly	"When in Love"	
2026	Pelican	Ascending - EP	"Cascading Crescent"	

=== As producer/engineer ===
Year	Artist	Album	Ref
2002	My Chemical Romance	Like Phantoms, Forever	
2002	My Chemical Romance	I Brought You My Bullets, You Brought Me Your Love	
2005	The Blackout Pact	Hello Sailor	
