= Common Existence =

Studio album by Thursday
- Released: February 17, 2009
- Recorded: August–November 2008
- Studio: Tarbox Road, Cassadaga, New York
- Genre: Post-hardcore
- Length: 44:51
- Label: Epitaph
- Producer: Dave Fridmann

Thursday chronology
| Thursday / Envy (2008) | Common Existence (2009) | No Devolución (2011) |

Common Existence is the fifth full-length album from American rock band Thursday.

== Recording ==
In March 2008, the band spent sometime recording at Big Blue Meenie Recording Studio in Jersey City, New Jersey. On August 13, 2008, the band announced that they had begun recording their next album with producer Dave Fridmann, who had previously produced A City by the Light Divided (2006). Recording took place at Fridmann's Tarbox Road Studios. The album was completed in November, with mixing being done that same month.

== Composition and lyrics ==
The album includes the track "As He Climbed The Dark Mountain," which previously appeared on the band's split EP with Japanese hardcore band Envy. The song "Last Call" originates from 2005 when five demos were leaked. While the first four were released on A City by the Light Divided, "Last Call" had not been released up until now. The band explores many subjects, including marriage (”Last Call”), fatherhood (”As He Climbed the Dark Mountain”), and physical abuse (”Time’s Arrow”). According to Rickly, "You Were the Cancer" initially dealt with "somebody in my life that I really wanted to get out of my life," before turning into a meditation on mortality.

In an interview, Rickly explained the album's title refers to humanity's shared experience, and that many of the songs were influenced by the words of his favorite poets and authors.

Almost every song on the record is connected to a different writer. The first song, "Resuscitation of a Dead Man" is influenced by Denis Johnson's Resuscitation of a Hanged Man. Another song is based on a book Martin Amis's Time's Arrow. The whole record also has a lot of themes from Roberto Bolano, a poet who wrote The Savage Detectives and a few other things. The song "Circuits of Fever" is very influenced by [writer] David Foster Wallace.

In successive interviews with Spin.com and Rock Sound, keyboard player Andrew Everding and vocalist Geoff Rickly explained the significance of "Friends in the Armed Forces":

"[The song] is about a personal experience that Geoff had with someone we know who's serving in the Iraq conflict. It can be forced down your throat to support someone who's fighting for a cause you don't believe in... We support you as people but we don't support your efforts." - Andrew Everding, Rock Sound interview

"I have a close friend in the service and several others that have finished their tours... The song was inspired by my conversations with them and by my conversations with their family members. It's about the shifting of perspective when it comes to wrong and right - ultimately, the song is a wish for peace and wellbeing for my friends." - Geoff Rickly, Spin.com interview

== Release ==
On September 30, 2008, it was announced that the band had signed to independent label Epitaph Records and that their next album would be released in the spring. Rickly said one of the group's biggest concerns is that they "find a situation where we could be free to just be Thursday. Epitaph have continually voiced their desire to help us become the band that we have always wanted to be." On November 18, they announced that their next album would be called Common Existence and that it would be released in early 2009. Following this, the band went on a tour of Canada with Rise Against. On December 9, "Resuscitation of a Dead Man" was post on the group's Myspace page. The following day, the album's track listing was posted online. On December 24, "Resuscitation of a Dead Man" was released as a single. On February 3, 2009, "Friends in the Armed Forces" was posted on the band's Myspace page. On February 10, "Resuscitation of a Dead Man" was released as a free download. On February 12, Common Existence was made available for streaming through the band's Myspace, before being released on February 17 through Epitaph Records.

On February 18, a music video was released for "Resuscitation of a Dead Man". The video features various pyrotechnics such as sparks falling around the band. Footage includes the band performing in a red room and urgent scenes of a man being rushed on a gurney. Later on, Thursday's amplifiers become engulfed in fire as well. In an interview on No. 1 Countdown, band members stated that all pyrotechnics were indeed real and frequently singed their hair. Between mid-February and early April 2009, the band headlined the Taste of Chaos tour, with support from Bring Me the Horizon, Four Year Strong, Pierce the Veil and Cancer Bats. During this trek, the band appeared on The Daily Habit, where they performed "Resuscitation of a Dead Man" and "Friends in the Armed Forces". Following this, the band toured Europe as part of the Give it a Name festival, and played a few standalone shows in Belgium, Italy and Switzerland. In August 2009, the band performed at Area 4 Festival in Germany, FM4 Frequency Festival in Austria and the Reading and Leeds Festivals in the UK. On September 15, 2009, a deluxe edition of Common Existence was released, with five bonus tracks, the music video for "Resuscitation of a Dead Man" and a digital booklet. Following this, they went on a cross-country US tour with support from the Fall of Troy, Young Widows, La Dispute, the Dear Hunter, Touché Amoré and Midnight Masses, until October 2009. During this trek, a music video was released for "Circuits of Fever". They then toured the UK with Rise Against and Poison the Well in November 2009, and went a US tour in December 2009 with the Dillinger Escape Plan and Fake Problems. They ended the year with a holiday show in New Jersey with Glassjaw, the Dillinger Escape Plan and United Nations.

== Reception ==
Professional ratings
Aggregate scores
| Source | Rating |
|---|---|
| Metacritic | 72/100 |
Review scores
| Source | Rating |
| AllMusic | 4/5 stars |
| Alternative Press | 4/5 stars |
| Drowned in Sound | 7/10 |
| Entertainment Weekly | B− |
| musicOMH | 3.5/5 stars |
| PopMatters | 6/10 stars |
| Rolling Stone | 2.5/5 stars |
| Slant | 3.5/5 stars |
| Spin | 7/10 |
| USA Today | 2.5/4 stars |

The album so far has a score of 72 out of 100 from Metacritic based on "generally favorable reviews". AbsolutePunk gave it an 88% and said, "Over the course of the last few years, Thursday has seemed to be the forgotten band, one we take for granted. But with Common Existence, Thursday will be knocking down doors throughout 2009." Punknews.org gave it a score of four stars out of five and said, "true return to indie-dom, Common Existence is a good fit for Epitaph. Both sides prove they still know what good post-hardcore music sounds like. [...] Common Existence washes the bad taste of Sage Francis and Escape the Fate right out. The record is somehow forward-thinking, further pushing the more atmospheric approach glimpsed at on the band's split with Envy last year, yet speckled with retro stylings of previous albums. Sputnikmusic also gave it four stars out of five and stated, "Just when Thursday seems to stir in unfamiliar, unwanted territory, they manage to find a way to make it happen." The A.V. Club gave it a B and said it was "the band’s densest, most accomplished album to date, with sonic layers and the complexity of a big-budget record, without the bloat." NME gave it a score of seven out of ten and called it "a worthy addition to Thursday’s canon."

Other reviews are average, mixed or negative: Blender gave it a score of three stars out of five and said it "amps up the band’s aggro guitars, cookie-monster yells and proggy ambition." Billboard gave it an average review and said it "melds the band's hardcore influences with shoegaze and atmospheric elements, with mixed results." The New York Times also gave it an average review and called it "the least pungent and immediate Thursday album since its debut. In places it sounds like an experiment, sometimes a successful one." Melodic.net gave it a score of one-and-a-half stars out of five and called it "one of the biggest letdowns".

== Track listing ==
All music by Thursday. All lyrics by Geoff Rickly.

1. "Resuscitation of a Dead Man" – 3:21
2. "Last Call" – 4:03
3. "As He Climbed the Dark Mountain" – 3:01
4. "Friends in the Armed Forces" – 4:10
5. "Beyond the Visible Spectrum" – 3:59
6. "Time's Arrow" – 4:13
7. "Unintended Long Term Effects" – 2:18
8. "Circuits of Fever" – 5:07
9. "Subway Funeral" – 4:18
10. "Love Has Led Us Astray" – 4:39
11. "You Were the Cancer" – 5:49

Digital deluxe edition bonus tracks

12. "Fake Nostalgia" – 3:22
13. "Common Existence" – 3:53
14. "The Worst Vow" – 3:14
15. "Circuits of Fever (Innerpartysystem remix)" – 4:12
16. "Love Has Led Us Astray (original demo)" – 3:00

== Personnel ==
Thursday

- Geoff Rickly – vocals
- Tom Keeley – lead guitar, vocals
- Steve Pedulla – rhythm guitar, vocals
- Tim Payne – bass guitar
- Tucker Rule – drums
- Andrew Everding – keyboards, synthesizers, vocals

Additional Musicians

- Tim McIlrath – guest vocals on "Resuscitation of a Dead Man"
- Walter Schreifels – guest vocals on "Friends in the Armed Forces"

Production

- Produced, recorded, and mixed by Dave Fridmann
- Engineered by Dave Fridmann, Andrew Everding, Joseph Pedulla and Karla Allen
- Mastered by Greg Calbi and Steve Fallone

Art

- Photography by Michael Brandt, Dennis Keeley and Mike Chapman
- Layout by Nick Pritchard

== Charts ==
Chart performance for Common Existence
| Chart (2009) | Peak position |
|---|---|
| Australian Hitseekers Albums (ARIA) | 4 |
| Canadian Albums (Nielsen SoundScan) | 88 |
| UK Rock & Metal Albums (OCC) | 17 |
| US Billboard 200 | 56 |
| US Independent Albums (Billboard) | 4 |
| US Top Alternative Albums (Billboard) | 14 |
| US Top Rock Albums (Billboard) | 19 |
| US Top Tastemaker Albums (Billboard) | 13 |
