= Thursday (band) =

American rock band

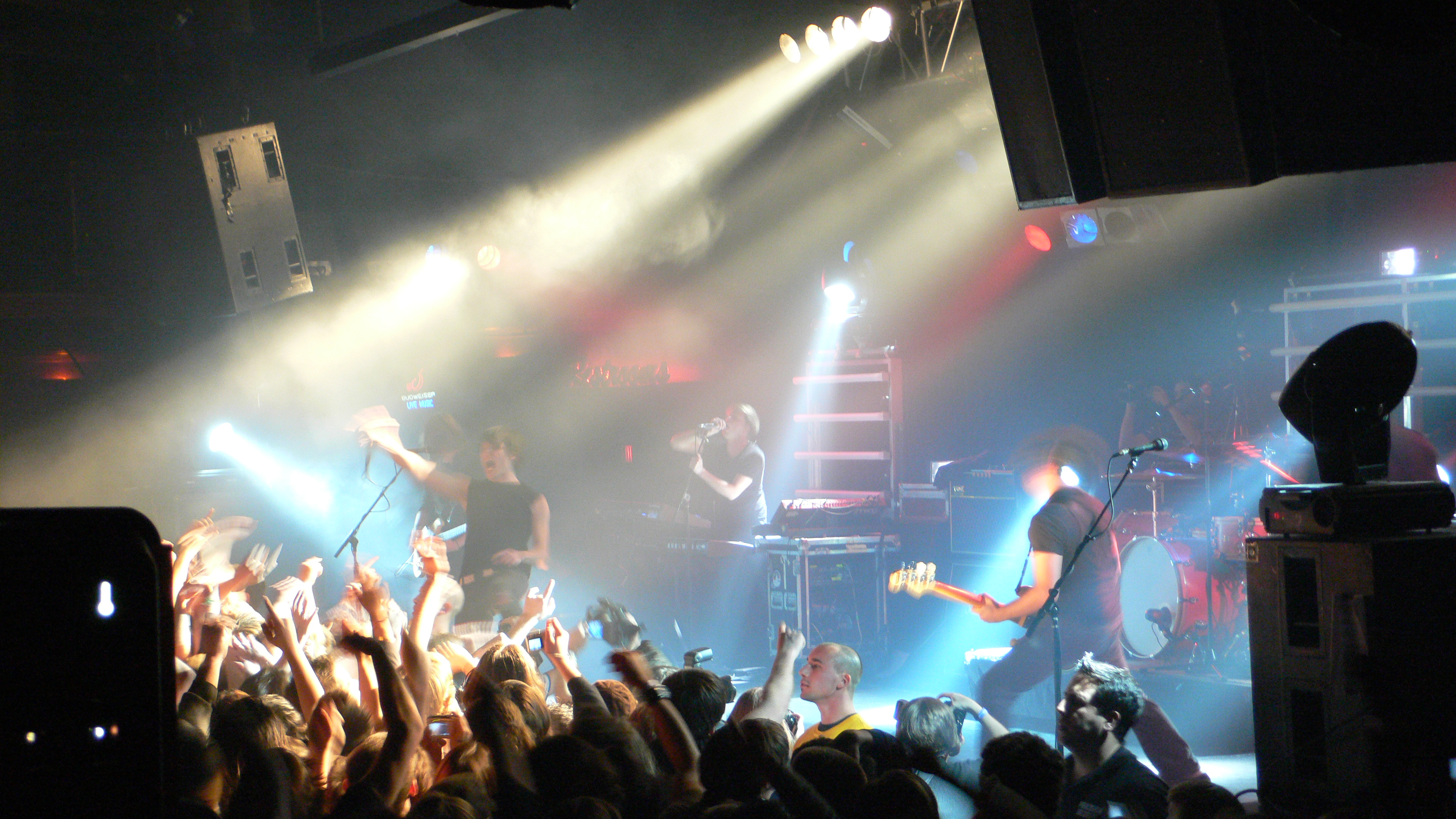
- Thursday performing in 2006. From left to right: Tom Keeley, Geoff Rickly, Andrew Everding, Tim Payne, Tucker Rule and Steve Pedulla.

Background information
- Origin: New Brunswick, New Jersey, U.S.
- Genres: Post-hardcore; emo; pop screamo; screamo
- Years active: 1998–2012; 2016–2019; 2020–present
- Labels: Eyeball; Victory; Island; Epitaph; Velocity
- Spinoffs: United Nations; No Devotion; L.S. Dunes
- Members: Tom Keeley; Tim Payne; Geoff Rickly; Tucker Rule; Steve Pedulla
- Past members: Bill Henderson; Andrew Everding
- Website: thursday.net

Thursday is an American rock band formed in New Brunswick, New Jersey, in 1998. The band consists of Geoff Rickly (lead vocals), Tom Keeley (lead guitar, backing vocals), Steve Pedulla (rhythm guitar, backing vocals), Tim Payne (bass), and Tucker Rule (drums).

The band's debut album Waiting (1999) featured original guitarist Bill Henderson, who left in 2000 and was replaced by Pedulla. Thursday gained popularity with their second album Full Collapse (2001), and the band's major-label debut War All the Time (2003) debuted at number 7 on the US Billboard 200. The band released A City by the Light Divided (2006), Common Existence (2009) and No Devolución (2011) before announcing an indefinite hiatus following Australian tour dates in 2012, which Rickly later confirmed was a full disbandment.

Thursday reunited in 2016, touring for the next few years and breaking up again in 2019. In 2020, Thursday announced another reunion at Chicago's Riot Fest in 2021. In 2024, the band released "Application for Release From the Dream", their first new song in 13 years.

The band is considered influential in the post-hardcore music scene in the 2000s, and is credited as one of the key bands to popularize the darker emo sound and screaming vocals which came to prominence at the time.

== History ==
=== Formation and Waiting (1998–2000) ===
Thursday was formed in 1998 by guitarist Tom Keeley and drummer Tucker Rule. Months later, Keeley met Geoff Rickly at an Ink & Dagger show and Rickly joined the band as lead singer. The group were soon joined by bassist Tim Payne and guitarist Bill Henderson and began playing basement shows in New Brunswick where they were students at Rutgers University and the surrounding New Jersey and New York areas, playing their first official show on December 31, 1998 in Rickly's basement alongside Midtown, Saves the Day and Poison the Well.

The band recorded demos to hand out at shows, and in the summer of 1999, teamed up with MP3.com for their first official release, the 1999 Summer Tour EP, which featured demos of songs that would soon be found on their debut album, Waiting. The album was released on November 8, 1999, on northern New Jersey–based Eyeball Records without any singles or support from television or radio.

=== Full Collapse (2001–2002) ===
In 2001, Thursday signed to independent label Victory Records. After signing, they were warned by their friends that they had "gotten ourselves into a situation that we would regret". The group was unsure what they meant, but thought things would turn out fine due to their contract with the label. They initially thought that part of the contract meant they could sign with a different label they wanted to. However, they realized the deal had stated they could only leave Victory if it was to join a major label, which they thought was "a far-fetched idea to say the least." Later in the year, they released their second album Full Collapse through the label, eventually reaching number 178 on the Billboard 200. Before appearing on Warped Tour, the group visited Victory's offices and learned about Thursday-branded whoopee cushions that the label was planning to sell at the tour. Vocalist Geoff Rickly discussed this matter with Victory founder Tony Brummel, and according to the band, responded that Victory "was a big company and that they didn't have time to run everything by the band."

On several occasions, the group attempted to have better communication with the label in regards to promotion. On one occasion, Brummel informed them they were not living up to his expectations. Sometime afterward, the group was touring with Saves the Day. Brummel became more positive in his interactions, frequently calling the band "just to say hello, or to ask how record sales at shows were going." The group were disappointed that his positivity "wasn't there from the beginning. ... Instead of Tony's relationship with us being based on a love for music, it was based entirely on numbers." The band's new-found popularity and disgust with the label led to internal problems, which almost led the band to disband. The situation caused the creation of the Five Stories Falling EP, a release the band used to fulfill contractual obligations with Victory Records. At live shows, the band routinely told fans not to purchase the EP, but instead to download "Jet Black New Year", the only new studio recording found on the EP, with the rest consisting of live performances of four Full Collapse songs. While all the interactions with the label were occurring, the group were being contacted by major labels. The group, who "didn't understand [anything] about major labels", pondered about other independent labels they would join. However, due to their contract they wouldn't be allowed to move to another independent label. Throughout 2001, people from major label Island Records had been to the band's shows since they became a full-time touring act. Soon after, the label expressed interest in signing the band.

=== War All the Time (2003–2005) ===
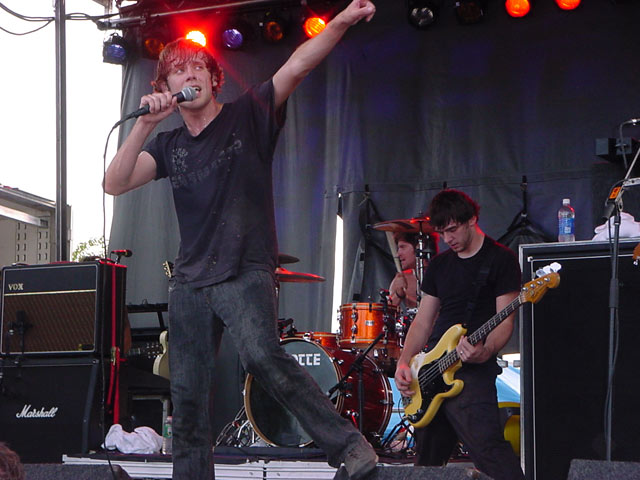
Thursday performing in 2004

In late May 2002, the group announced they had signed to Island Records, following a bidding war between other major labels. (Note: In April 2002, it was reported that MCA Records acquired a 25% stake in Victory Records. In October of the same year, it was announced that the deal had fallen apart when Thursday revealed they had signed to Island Records.) Up to this point, Full Collapse had sold 111,000 copies. On September 9, the group's signing to Island Records was made official following negotiations of an exit agreement with Victory Records. The agreement required parent company Island/Def Jam to buy out Victory's contract claim for the group's next two albums. Rickly said as a result of the deal, Victory Records received $1,200,000, which meant the band would be "[paying off] that bill for as long as we were on the new label." In addition, their next two albums were required to feature the Victory logo.

With expectation building for their follow-up album, Rickly wanted their next album to be "really aggressive and progressive ... and have all these boundary pushing ideas". In September and October, the group went on the Plea for Peace Tour, and were planning to work on their next album following its conclusion. They said they had accumulated a lot of ideas but were unable to work on them due to touring. In mid-November, the group began writing new material.

After an entire writing and recording process that took only six months, the band issued their third album and major label debut, War All the Time, on September 16, 2003, to critical acclaim and strong commercial performance. War All the Time was the first release to feature Andrew Everding on keyboards, though he would not become an official member of the band until December 2004, when he was officially welcomed into the band at a Christmas holiday show held at the Starland Ballroom in Sayreville, New Jersey. The album's title, coupled with it being released approximately two years after the terrorist attacks of September 11, 2001, led many critics to believe it was a political album; however, Rickly has denied this on many accounts, instead claiming that he is speaking about love being a war. The album spawned two singles: "Signals Over the Air" and "War All the Time", though the latter received considerably less attention due to MTV banning the video for controversial material involving a fake news feed that appeared to be real and teenagers being weapon targets.

Thursday toured extensively to support War All the Time, featuring dates with acts such as AFI, Thrice, and Coheed and Cambria. On these tours, Thursday performed many in-store acoustic sessions at various Tower Records stores and other record stores. The band also recorded a live acoustic session for Y100 Sonic Sessions, a radio program on the now defunct Philadelphia-based radio station, Y100. The live acoustic version of single "Signals Over the Air" was used on Y100 Sonic Sessions Volume 8. The band released two EPs: the first was Live from the SoHo & Santa Monica Stores Split EP and sold exclusively on iTunes, and the second was a promotion found in Revolver, called the Live in Detroit EP.

The band went on an indefinite hiatus in 2004, citing label pressure, extensive touring, and health problems as the reasons. However, Thursday returned for a charitable performance to save New York City's CBGB, on August 25, 2005, which was streamed live through the CBGB's website.

=== A City by the Light Divided and Envy split release (2006–2008) ===
In fall 2005, five Thursday demo songs were stolen from the iPod of the tour manager for My American Heart, a band Rickly had recently collaborated with for their song "We Are the Fabrication". The band issued a statement on their official website stating that they were disappointed the unfinished products leaked, but that they were glad that people take that much interest in their music. The band confirmed the title of one demo, "At This Velocity" and promised it would make their upcoming album. Three other songs ("The Other Side of the Crash/Over and Out (Of Control)", "Telegraph Avenue Kiss", and "Autumn Leaves Revisited") would also make the album, while the remaining demo would later become the song "Last Call" on their fifth studio album, Common Existence. Thursday had originally toyed with the idea of a double album to follow up War All the Time but the idea was scrapped, reporting on their website that they believed "not even The Beatles could properly fill two discs with enough worthy material".

Thursday released their fourth album and second major label release, A City by the Light Divided, on May 2, 2006, on Island Records in the US and Hassle Records in the United Kingdom. The album was produced by Dave Fridmann, becoming Thursday's first full-length album not produced by Sal Villanueva. The title was created by Geoff Rickly by combining two lines from the poem Sunstone by Octavio Paz. The album was available for preview on the band's MySpace page on April 18, 2006, two weeks before it was officially released. A City by the Light Divided was generally received well by critics, spawning two singles: "Counting 5-4-3-2-1" and "At This Velocity", though the latter received considerably less attention. The band left Island Records in early 2007. In the following months, numerous record labels, including Ferret Music, Atlantic Records, and Fueled by Ramen, expressed interest in signing Thursday.

At their 2007 New Year's Eve show at the Starland Ballroom, the band announced that they will be writing and recording new material in 2008. During a private show they performed on May 3, 2007, in New York City, long-time friend and artist manager, David "Rev" Ciancio proposed to his fiancée on stage. Thursday also held a performance on May 5 at The Bamboozle under the fake name Bearfort. Thursday cancelled all tour plans until their fall tour with Circle Takes the Square and Portugal. The Man in support of Kill the House Lights, a DVD/CD compilation album and live album. featuring demos, unreleased songs, footage of live performances, and a documentary about the band. The album was released on October 30, 2007, by their former label Victory Records.

Thursday announced on April 2, 2008, via a MySpace bulletin and their official website, a new split album with Japanese post-hardcore band Envy. The band debuted a song from the album live during their show in Poughkeepsie on April 24, 2008, and the album, Thursday / Envy, was released on Temporary Residence Limited on November 4, 2008.

=== Common Existence (2009–2010) ===
The band announced on September 30, 2008, that they had signed with Epitaph Records, regarding their new label the band stated: "It's a great feeling to have a label encourage you to be more socially conscious and politically active." Thursday released their fifth full-length album,Common Existence, on February 17, 2009, on Epitaph Records. In a March 2009 interview, Rickly explained the album's title refers to humanity's shared experience, and that many of the songs were influenced by the words of his favorite poets and authors: "Almost every song on the record is connected to a different writer. The first song, "Resuscitation of a Dead Man" is influenced by Denis Johnson's Resuscitation of a Hanged Man. Another song is based on a book [ Martin Amis'] Time's Arrow. The whole record also has a lot of themes from Roberto Bolano, a poet who wrote The Savage Detectives and a few other things. The song "Circuits of Fever" is very influenced by [writer] David Foster Wallace." Cormac McCarthy has also influenced Rickly.

Thursday headlined the 2009 Taste of Chaos Tour with support from Bring Me the Horizon, Four Year Strong, Pierce The Veil, Cancer Bats and a local act. The band was not well received on this tour, as the majority of the audience members showed up at tour dates mainly for opening act Bring Me the Horizon, with guitarist Tom Keeley approximating about 90% of the audience would leave before their set, and described the tour as an "awful experience." Rickly said the tour was "stupid" and found it difficult to share a stage with Bring Me the Horizon, who would call the crowd "faggots" during their sets.

=== No Devolución and disbandment (2011–2015) ===
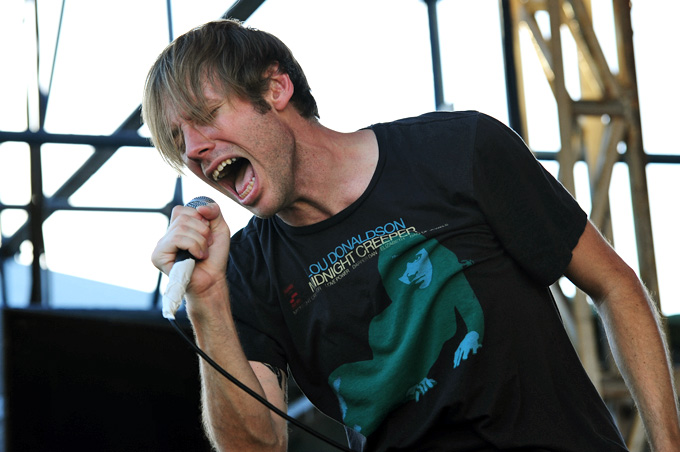
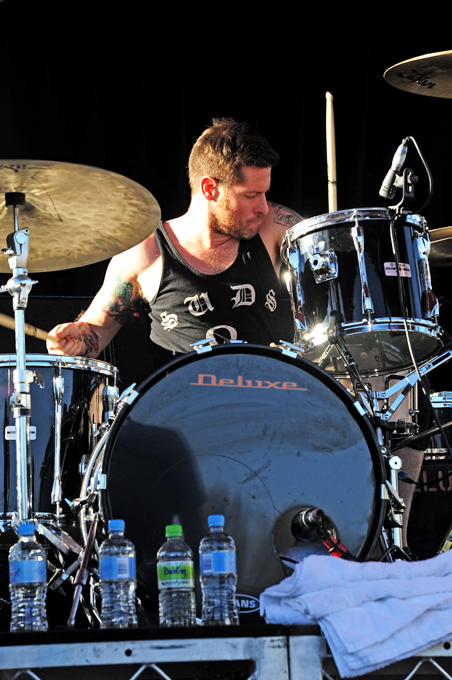
Rickly (top), Rule (bottom performing with Thursday at the 2012 Soundwave Festival, the band's last show before their initial disbandment.

Thursday began recording their next album in July 2010, at Tarbox Road Studios in Fredonia, New York with Dave Fridmann, who had also produced the group's two previous albums. Their sixth album and second release for Epitaph Records, No Devolución, was released on April 12, 2011. Vocalist Geoff Rickly commented on the style of the new album, stating, "In style, this record feels like a radical departure from our earlier records but in substance it feels like a return. The songs are more vulnerable than they've been in a long time. [...] It's very atmospheric and mood oriented so far." Rickly also stated that the primary lyrical theme is devotion. Thursday debuted "Turnpike Divides" at their annual holiday show on December 30, 2010, at the Starland Ballroom.

On November 22, 2011, Thursday posted a statement on their official website and their Twitter account reading "Thanks & Love", expressing their intention to stop producing music together. However, the statement about the status of band was ambiguous, not stating explicitly in the article whether they were breaking up or on an indefinite hiatus. The following is excerpted from the article:

Despite the fantastic year that the band has enjoyed, creatively, things haven't been as easy for us on a personal level. Without diving into detail, it's fair to say that this year has been an endless series of personal difficulties. We haven't had any falling out and are all still close. I'm sure that we will continue to create, in some capacity, together. We've talked about turning Thursday into something else: a non-profit, a band that only records sporadically, a collection of other projects… Underneath it all, the personal circumstances involved make it impossible to continue Thursday in the spirit that has made it special. So, we stop. For now, at least.

The band's final show took place on March 5, 2012, at the Soundwave festival in Perth, Australia.

In January 2013, Geoff Rickly stated during an interview that Thursday had in fact disbanded, and that the term "hiatus" was misleading as it had only been used in case the band did ever decided to play a show again. He did, however, indicate that there was a possibility for the band to play shows in the future, but no new material would ever be produced.

Since their disbandment, Rickly formed the band No Devotion in 2014 with former members of the band Lostprophets, and continued with his side-project United Nations. Tucker Rule became the touring drummer for the British boy band The Wanted, the pop-punk band Yellowcard and worked as a hired musician as well as studio drummer.

=== Reunion and second breakup (2016–2019) ===
In January 2016, former members of Thursday posted a picture of themselves hanging out to Rickly's Twitter account. This sparked rumors that the band would soon be reuniting, however Rickly quickly dispelled them by saying that their communication was minimal in the five years since disbanding and they were "just finally mending some fences and healing some old wounds." Thursday's former booking agent began encouraging them to reunite the band with the freedom to do whatever they wanted and without the pressure of having to write a new album.

Two months later, Thursday announced a reunion at Atlanta's Wrecking Ball festival in August 2016. Rickly said: "Five years ago, we found it necessary to end Thursday for reasons beyond our control. Earlier this year, we were able to reconcile all of our differences and spend time together. This is a vital component to what we loved about being in Thursday and we're happy to say that we'll be playing this show as the same line-up that began touring together on Full Collapse and jointly worked on every record since." Thursday had no intentions to reunite before this and only agreed to perform only two days before publicly announcing their reunion, making the decision because of the festival's strong lineup and the involvement of a charity.

In May, Thursday announced an appearance at both Chicago and Denver's Riot Fest dates in September. On June 15, Thursday announced a "homecoming" at Starland Ballroom on December 30. On January 31, 2017, Thursday announced a 24-date tour for March and April 2017, the band's first full tour since 2012. In June, Thursday headlined the Northside Festival in Brooklyn, New York.

The band announced in October 2018 that their reunion would end in 2019, stating, "When we stopped playing last time, it wasn't on the best of terms. This time, we get to put down touring on the very highest of notes: in each other's lives and able to pick up and play together behind closed doors whenever we want. If we are ever able to do Thursday again, it will be a new, separate chapter. Thank you all for your time, attention and friendship." The band's planned final show took place on March 17, 2019, at Saint Vitus in Brooklyn, New York.

However, Thursday did not play any international shows during this reunion, and due to mounting pressure from their international fanbase, the band announced in May 2019 a German show at Cologne's Family First Festival. "It seemed impossible that we would all be available at the same time to play shows again, especially in any sustained way. But when our old friends in boysetsfire asked us to play this festival with them, we saw that we had a rare opportunity to accomplish two things at once: visit a country that's always been kind to Thursday and play, once more, with a band that we've admired since before we were a band," the band said.

Further shows followed in Eindhoven, Netherlands, and two UK shows at London's Electric Ballroom, with Full Collapse played on the first night and War All the Time played on the second, which took place in December 2019. The band also opened for the reunited My Chemical Romance at Los Angeles' The Shrine on December 20.

=== Second return (2020–present) ===
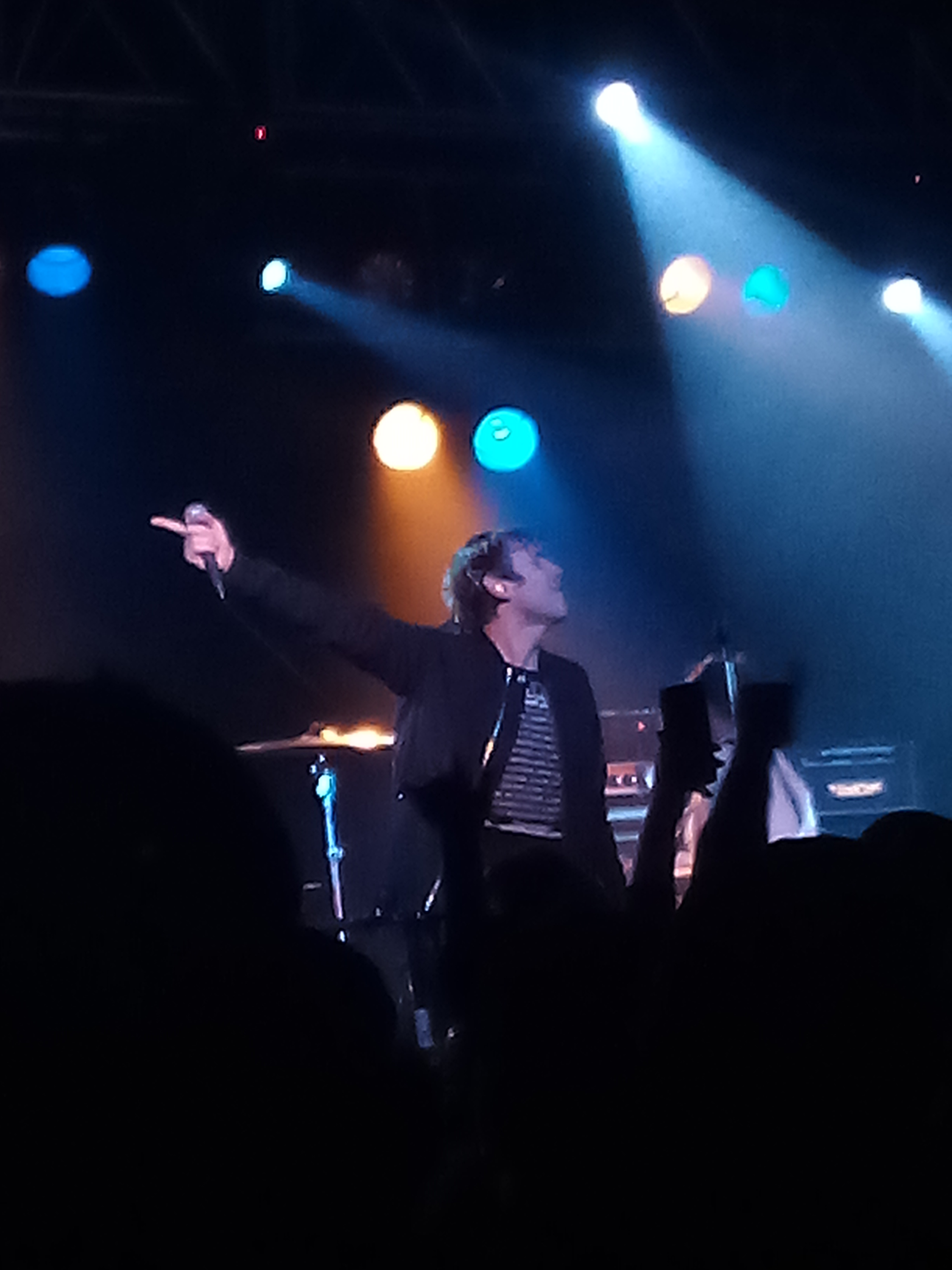
Geoff Rickly performing with Thursday in 2022

In June 2020, Thursday announced that their first show in nearly two years would take place at Riot Fest in September 2021. The band reunited without Everding, reverting to the Full Collapse and War All the Time-era line-up. Between August 2020 and April 2021, the band shared three virtual performances entitled Signals. The first performance (V1) featured guest guitarist Frank Iero, and largely consisted of stripped-back versions of the band's songs. The second (V2) was a commemorative holiday show, with guests including Iero, Jim Ward, Walter Schriefels and Bartees Strange. The third and final performance (V3) saw the band performing Full Collapse and No Devolución in their entirety.

In June 2021, the band shared a cover of Bruce Springsteen's "Dancing in the Dark" as part of an ongoing series of covers headed by the creative collective Two Minutes To Late Night. They also played a series of live shows that same month throughout the east coast and midwest of the US, with Taking Back Sunday and Piebald.

In October 2021, the band were featured in Dan Ozzi's book Sellout: The Major Label Feeding Frenzy That Swept Punk, Emo, And Hardcore 1994–2007. A chapter on War All the Time was included in the book, as well as a photo of the band performing live serving as the book's cover. In July 2022, the band headlined Philadelphia's This is Hardcore Fest, playing Full Collapse in its entirety. By this point, Thursday became a "core trio" of Rickly, Pedulla and Rule, with Norman Brannon (of Texas Is the Reason) replacing Keeley as touring guitarist and Stu Richardson (of Lostprophets and No Devotion) replacing Payne as touring bassist.

In September 2022, the band joined My Chemical Romance as a guest on their North American tour for seven shows. On their last night opening, Thursday performed "Jet Black New Year" with Gerard Way, who features on the original song. Rickly then performed "This Is the Best Day Ever" with My Chemical Romance, a song he featured on.

On April 12, 2024, the band released their first new song in 13 years, "Application for Release From the Dream". It was the band's first song with Brannon as guitarist, while Richardson produced and played keyboards. A second new song, "White Bikes", was released on December 6. It was recorded at the Hansa Studio in Berlin, featuring Richardson on bass and was written about the death of Rickly's friend. A third song, "Taking Inventory of a Frozen Lake", was released on January 1, 2025.

In February 2026, the band was announced as part of the lineup for the Louder Than Life music festival in Louisville, scheduled to take place in September.

In April 2026, the band began their "Full City Devolución" tour, featuring Chris Conley from Saves The Day. The band performed songs from the albums Full Collapse, A City by the Light Divided, and No Devolución, celebrating their respective 25, 20, and 15 year anniversaries. The tour concluded on April 30 in Boston.

== Logo ==
The Thursday dove logo

Thursday used a dove logo which is featured on much of the band's artwork and merchandise. The dove is believed to have been conceived by guitarist Tom Keeley on a tour bus sometime before Full Collapse was recorded. Lyrics from the song "Cross Out the Eyes" on the album reference a dove twice, but it is unknown if these lyrics were inspired by the dove art or vice versa. The logo debuted on the cover art for War All the Time in 2003, appearing on the artwork for all of Thursday's album and single artwork until 2011, where it was notably absent on the cover art for their sixth and final album No Devolución.

The band also used a second logo, a red bullseye with a small chevron below it. This logo first appeared on the cover art for A City by the Light Divided in 2006, and featured on merchandise related to the album. It can also be seen faded in the background of the cover for Kill the House Lights.

Additionally, Shepard Fairey (creator of Obey) created artwork for the band with a new dove logo, which has been used on other works by Fairey.

== Musical style and influences ==
Thursday's musical style has been described as post-hardcore, emo, and screamo. The band has rejected those labels in the past; guitarist Pedulla has stated that they have "always described ourselves as melodic hardcore."

Early on, Thursday was influenced by such bands as Boysetsfire, Ink & Dagger, the Smiths, the Cure, Joy Division, Fugazi, Drive Like Jehu, New Order, Quicksand, Saetia, You and I, Swing Kids, Unbroken, American Nightmare, the Pixies, Lungfish, Circus Lupus, Rites of Spring, and Embrace. In a 2014 interview with Vice Media, Rickly said that Thursday's sound was based upon how many local shows in the New Brunswick scene featured artists with sonically dissimilar sounds, particularly citing one featuring Rainer Maria and Converge. Over time, the band has absorbed elements of bands as varied as Sigur Rós, My Bloody Valentine, Mogwai, Godspeed You! Black Emperor, Sunny Day Real Estate, the Appleseed Cast, At the Drive-In, and Jawbox.

Thursday have been cited as an influence by My Chemical Romance, Senses Fail, Funeral for a Friend, Paramore, Escape the Fate, Dance Gavin Dance, Trivium, Rolo Tomassi, Deafheaven, Pianos Become the Teeth, Touché Amoré, La Dispute, Gatherers, Capsize, Wax Idols, Stay Inside, Vein.fm and Gel. In a 2025 interview, Anthony Green credited a conversation with Thursday drummer Tucker Rule as what inspired him to move to California and form Saosin.

== Band members ==
Current

- Geoff Rickly – lead vocals (1998–2012, 2016–2019, 2020–present)
- Tom Keeley – lead guitar, backing vocals (1998–2012, 2016–2019, 2020–present; not touring 2021–present)
- Tim Payne – bass (1998–2012, 2016–2019, 2020–present; not touring 2009–2011, 2017, 2022–present)
- Tucker Rule – drums (1998–2012, 2016–2019, 2020–present)
- Steve Pedulla – rhythm guitar, backing vocals (2000–2012, 2016–2019, 2020–present; not touring 2025)

Current touring musicians

- Stu Richardson – bass, keyboards, backing vocals (2017, 2022–present; substitute for Tim Payne)
- Norman Brannon – lead guitar (2021–present; substitute for Tom Keeley)

Former

- Bill Henderson – rhythm guitar (1998–2000)
- Andrew Everding – keyboards, synthesizer, backing vocals (2004–2011, 2016–2019; session/touring 2002–2004)

Former touring musicians

- Lukas Previn – bass (2009–2011; substitute for Tim Payne)
- Brooks Tipton – keyboards, synthesizer (2011–2012)
- Kerry McCoy – lead guitar (2025; substitute for Tom Keeley)
- Jeff Gensterblum – drums (2025; substitute for Tucker Rule)
- Wade MacNeil – lead guitar (2026; substitute for Tom Keeley), rhythm guitar (2025; substitute for Steve Pedulla)

== Discography ==
Studio albums

- Waiting (1999)
- Full Collapse (2001)
- War All the Time (2003)
- A City by the Light Divided (2006)
- Common Existence (2009)
- No Devolución (2011)
