= A City by the Light Divided =

Studio album by Thursday
- Released: May 2, 2006
- Recorded: October 2005 – February 2006
- Studios: Tarbox Road Studios, Cassadaga, New York
- Genre: Post-hardcore
- Length: 45:56
- Label: Island
- Producer: Dave Fridmann

Thursday chronology
War All the Time (2003)	A City by the Light Divided (2006)	Kill the House Lights (2007)

Singles from A City by the Light Divided
- 1. "Counting 5-4-3-2-1" Released: April 18, 2006

A City by the Light Divided is the fourth studio album by Thursday, released by Island Records on May 2, 2006.

== Background ==
Thursday's third album and first since major label debut War All the Time was released on September 15, 2003. Following its release, keyboardist Andrew Everding, who had performed on the album, became a full-time member of the band. The group subsequently embarked on an exhaustive touring schedule with performances in the UK, Japan, New Zealand and Australia. As a result of this touring, personal problems between members began to occur, but by July they were aiming to record in the next few months.

The band wanted the record to have "a very live sound," and selected producer Dave Fridmann because of his work with such bands as the Flaming Lips, Mercury Rev, and Mogwai. In September, early demos leaked, and later that month the group started pre-production, done with Tim Gilles. Recording took place at Tarbox Road Studios, in Cassadaga, New York. Amanda Tannen of Stellastarr and Mary Fridmann of Bass Piggy provided additional vocals on "We Will Overcome". In mid-February, recording was finished and the album was in the process of being mixed by Fridmann. Tom Coyne mastered the album at Sterling sound, in New York City.

The album's title was adapted from a line from an Octavio Paz poem. According to Rickley, the title speaks to how "each person contains the light and the dark, the good and the bad, and the way it's externalized in an urban metropolis."

== Release ==
On February 5, 2006, A City by the Light Divided was announced for release in May. In mid-February, the group were working on ideas for a music video for "Counting 5-4-3-2-1" with production companies Refused TV and Artificial Army. The song was made available for streaming on February 28. From mid March to the beginning of April, the band went on the first leg of the Shirts for a Cure tour, with support from Minus the Bear, The Number Twelve Looks Like You, and We're All Broken. On March 29, "At This Velocity" was made available for streaming via Alternative Press. For most of April, the band went on the 2006 edition of the Taste of Chaos tour. However, on April 13, Rickly became ill, resulting in the band dropping off the tour. On April 18, A City by the Light Divided was made available for streaming via the band's Myspace profile, and "Counting 5-4-3-2-1" was released to radio.

From late April to late May, the band went on the second leg of the Shirts for a Cure tour, with support from Minus the Bear, mewithoutYou and We're All Broken. A City by the Light Divided was released on May 2 through Island Records. The UK version of the album, which was released through Hassle Records, included the bonus track "Even the Sand Is Made of Seashells". In May and June, the group went on a UK tour. In the summer, the band went on the 2006 edition of Warped Tour. In October and November, the group went on the 2006 international edition of the Taste of Chaos tour, visiting New Zealand, Australia, and the UK. In between dates on this tour, the band went on a co-headlining tour with Rise Against. In January and February 2007, the band went on a tour of the U.S. with support from Fear Before the March of Flames, Murder by Death and Heavy Heavy Low Low.

== Reception ==
Professional ratings
Aggregate scores
Source	Rating
Metacritic	75/100
Review scores
Source	Rating
AllMusic	4/5 stars
Alternative Press	5/5 stars
The A.V. Club	B+
Entertainment Weekly	A−
NME	7/10
Now	3/5 stars
PopMatters	7/10 stars
Robert Christgau	C+
Rolling Stone	1.5/5 stars
Stylus Magazine	A−

=== Critical response ===
The album so far has a score of 75 out of 100 from Metacritic based on "generally favorable reviews". AbsolutePunk gave it a score of 90% and said that "just like the Buffalo Bills, it’s not about how you start the game, but about how strong you can comeback and finish, and A City By The Light Divided exemplifies this very well." Blender gave it a score of four stars out of five and called it "A widescreen goth-punk stunner." Billboard gave it a positive review and called it "A quality album." Some reviews are average or mixed: Uncut gave it three stars out of five and said, "A sprinkle of Flaming Lips fairy-dust may be just what the genre needs to slip its genre straitjacket." Melodic.net also gave it a score of three stars out of five and said it was "not a superb album but it's a helluva lot better than War All the Time."

=== Commercial performance ===
It reached #20 on the Billboard 200. A month after its release, the album had sold over 81,000 copies. By July, it had sold 90,000 copies. By April 2007, it had sold 132,000 copies.

== Track listing ==
All music by Thursday, all lyrics by Geoff Rickly.

No.	Title	Length
1.	"The Other Side of the Crash/Over and Out (Of Control)"	4:41
2.	"Counting 5-4-3-2-1"	3:19
3.	"Sugar in the Sacrament"	5:12
4.	"At This Velocity"	2:58
5.	"We Will Overcome"	3:39
6.	"Arc-Lamps, Signal Flares, a Shower of White (The Light)"	2:32
7.	"Running from the Rain"	4:00
8.	"Telegraph Avenue Kiss"	3:35
9.	"The Lovesong Writer"	5:18
10.	"Into the Blinding Light"	3:48
11.	"Autumn Leaves Revisited"	6:56
Total length:		45:56

Bonus tracks

Japanese, UK, iTunes bonus track
No.	Title	Length
12.	"Even the Sand Is Made of Seashells"	4:10

Japanese bonus track
No.	Title	Length
13.	"Running from the Rain" (Dave Fridmann remix)	4:05

== Personnel ==
Personnel per booklet.

Thursday

- Geoff Rickly – lead vocals
- Tom Keeley – lead guitar
- Steve Pedulla – rhythm guitar
- Tim Payne – bass guitar
- Tucker Rule – drums
- Andrew Everding – keyboards

Additional musicians

- Amanda Tannen – additional vocals on "We Will Overcome"
- Mary Fridmann – additional vocals on "We Will Overcome"

Production

- Dave Fridmann – producer, mixing, engineer
- Tom Coyne – mastering
- Tim Gilles – pre-production
- Melissa Cross – vocal coach
- Louis Marino – art direction, illustration, design
- Ken Schless – Photography

== Charts ==
Chart performance for A City by the Light Divided
Chart (2006)	Peak position
Australian Albums (ARIA)	63
Canadian Albums (Nielsen SoundScan)	27
UK Albums (OCC)	112
UK Independent Albums (Official Charts)	6
UK Rock & Metal Albums (Official Charts)	7
US Billboard 200	20
US Top Rock Albums (Billboard)	8
US Top Tastemaker Albums (Billboard)	6
