= Reality vs. the Optimist =

Studio album by Kiss Kiss
- Released: February 6, 2007
- Studio: The Clubhouse
- Genres: Indie rock; art rock; dark cabaret; emo; progressive rock
- Length: 32:22
- Label: Eyeball Records
- Producer: D. James Goodwin

Kiss Kiss chronology
Reality vs. the Optimist (2007)	The Meek Shall Inherit What's Left (2009)

Singles from Reality vs. the Optimist
- 1. "Machines" Released: 2007; 2. "Satellite" Released: 2007

Reality vs. The Optimist is the debut album by American indie rock band Kiss Kiss. It was released on February 6, 2007, on Eyeball Records.

The band commenced recording the album in 2006, with producer D. James Goodwin (Murder by Death, The Number Twelve Looks Like You). In December, the band released a teaser extended play, containing songs from the album, on their social networking sites. On December 26, following an unauthorized leak online, the entire album was made available via digital download.

They created a music video for the song "Machines". The band also recorded a live music video for the song "The Cats In Your House".

In 2013 the band launched a kickstarter campaign to finance the re-release of Reality vs. the Optimist on vinyl.

== Reception ==
Sputnikmusic states on "their explosive debut album, Reality vs. the Optimist, Kiss Kiss don’t just revive music, they build a cathedral to it out of a gypsy circus tent. In the space of twelve tracks, the caberet catches fire, the orchestra aches and Josh Benash’s voice breaks it's [sic] way through a truly groundbreaking masterpiece".

Other reviewers, like Andrew Parker state "this record gives the vibe of an ornate carnival where someone will die… of fun! (and of murder)."

== Track listing ==
No.	Title	Length
1.	"Janet"	4:15
2.	"Iris and Eye"	3:25
3.	"Sixth Sense"	2:45
4.	"A Conch to the Ear"	0:30
5.	"Machines"	2:35
6.	"Satellite"	3:36
7.	"Shits In Suits (Dress Up)"	2:16
8.	"The Friend Who Bends His Bolts At Fiends"	0:11
9.	"The Cats In Your House"	2:35
10.	"The Most Beautiful Birth Ever Endured"	0:27
11.	"Vagabond"	5:29
12.	"Stay the Day"	4:18
Total length:		32:22

== Credits ==
- Josh Benash (guitar, vocals, synthesizers)
- Jared Karns (drums)
- Gillian Rivers (violin)
- Pat Lamothe (bass)
