= Life in Death =

Studio album by The Oval Portrait
- Released: November 25, 2003
- Recorded: Stained Glass Studios, Paramus, NJ
- Genres: post-hardcore, post-punk, psychedelic rock, experimental metal
- Length: 37:30
- Label: Eyeball Records
- Producers: Jay Dezuzio, Alex Saavedra, Geoff Rickly

Life in Death is the only studio album released by The Oval Portrait through Eyeball Records on November 25, 2003. It was recorded at Stained Glass Studios in Paramus, New Jersey, by Jay Dezuzio and Alex Saavedra. The album was named in allusion to the original title of the Edgar Allan Poe story from which the band took their name. "Life in Death" features guest performances by Gerard Way of My Chemical Romance on the songs "Barnabus Collins Has More Skeletons in His Closet Than Vincent Price" and "From My Cold Dead Hands", as well as Murder by Death's Sarah Balliet and Vincent Edwards on cello and piano for the songs "From My Cold Dead Hands" and "Santa Sangre".

== Track listing ==
No.	Title	Length
1.	"Can't You Do Anything for Me?"	2:06
2.	"The Last Thing I Remember Was Dancing"	2:03
3.	"Leeching"	2:00
4.	"Misery of the Human Condition"	2:22
5.	"Barnabus Collins Has More Skeletons in His Closet Than Vincent Price"	4:16
6.	"What Happened to Phineas Gage?"	2:03
7.	"House of Mirrors"	1:45
8.	"Santa Sangre"	4:31
9.	"The Gray Man (For Albert)"	4:01
10.	"Ask Me How to Get Addicted"	2:35
11.	"The Life and Lies of An Icon"	2:55
12.	"If You Won't Burn With Me Then I'll Burn Alone"	3:15
13.	"From My Cold Dead Hands"	3:43
