= Mongrel (The Number Twelve Looks Like You album) =

Studio album by The Number Twelve Looks Like You
- Released: June 19, 2007
- Genre: Mathcore, post-hardcore, jazzcore
- Length: 37:28
- Label: Eyeball
- Producer: Casey Bates, The Number Twelve Looks Like You

The Number Twelve Looks Like You chronology
Nuclear. Sad. Nuclear. (2005)	Mongrel (2007)	Worse Than Alone (2009)

Professional ratings
Review scores
Source	Rating
AllMusic	link
AbsolutePunk	(78%) link
A.V. Club	(B+) link
SputnikMusic	link
PunkNews.org	link
Metal Injection	link

Mongrel is the third album by American mathcore band The Number Twelve Looks Like You. Recorded in Seattle over a four-month period, it is the follow-up to 2005's Nuclear. Sad. Nuclear.. In its opening week, it reached a peak position of 19 on the Top Heatseeker, and 34 on top Independent Albums Billboard Charts. On April 12, 2015 the album was re-released on limited edition, hand numbered cassettes.

== Sound and style ==
Singer Jesse Korman, describing the album, has stated:

"We don't want to sound like anybody else. We stepped it up to the point where we've killed everything we've ever done previously, while a lot of bands that started out heavier have seemed to be going more melodic and easier on crowds — at least that's the trend. It seems to be the path a lot of these heavy bands are going these days, and we didn't want our fans to be like, 'Oh no, it's all just going to be melodic.' We wanted to make sure we really kicked some ass [on Mongrel]. I don't know where we fit in, genre-wise, but this record's definitely something you've never heard before. On top of being incredibly heavy, there's stuff in there that's just the catchiest stuff I've heard in so long."

In a lead-up to the album's release a number of cryptic postings concerning the album were found on the internet by fans of the band. These included a video clip featuring a snippet of "Sleeping With The Fishes, See?" and three websites, displaying lyrics to "Grandfather" and "Sleeping With The Fishes, See?" as well as album artwork.

== Album name ==
According to Jesse Korman, in an interview with MTV, "the whole theme behind the album is mongrel...you can't really define what a 'mongrel' is — it's just a crazy mutt — and all of our songs are just all over the place. We wanted this album to be just complete chaos, with no direction at all." Korman further states that "While there's no thematic link between the Mongrel and the LP artwork...the cover features a humanoid creature that suffers from schizophrenia and [this creature] embodies the unruliness of the music."

== Track listing ==
All music by Alexis Pareja and Jon Karel. All lyrics by Justin Pedrick and Jesse Korman, except where noted.

No.	Title	Length
1.	"Imagine Nation Express"	4:16
2.	"El Piñata de la Muerte"	2:18
3.	"Jay Walking Backwards"	5:25
4.	"Grandfather"	4:39
5.	"Alright, I Admit It... It Was a Whore House"	3:35
6.	"Paper Weight Pigs" (additional lyrics by Matt "Donk" Isler)	2:55
7.	"Sleeping with the Fishes, See?"	3:40
8.	"Cradle in the Crater"	4:18
9.	"The Weekly Wars" (lyrics by Francis Corva)	4:01
10.	"The Try (Thank You)"	2:17

== Personnel ==
The Number Twelve Looks Like You

- Jesse Korman - vocals
- Justin Pedrick - vocals
- Alexis Pareja - guitars
- Jamie Mcilroy - guitars
- Chris Russell - bass guitar
- Jon Karel - drums, other percussion

Production

- Casey Bates - production
