= Worse Than Alone =

Worse than Alone

Studio album by The Number Twelve Looks Like You
- Released: March 10, 2009
- Recorded: 2008
- Studio: Backroom Studios in Rockaway, New Jersey
- Genre: Mathcore, avant-garde metal, post-hardcore, screamo
- Length: 46:08
- Label: Eyeball
- Producer: The Number Twelve Looks Like You

The Number Twelve Looks Like You chronology
Mongrel (2007)	Worse than Alone (2009)	Wild Gods (2019)

Professional ratings
Review scores
Source	Rating
Alternative Press	4/5 stars
Absolutepunk.net	(81/100)

Worse than Alone is the fourth studio album by The Number Twelve Looks Like You. It was released on March 10, 2009 through Eyeball Records. It was the final release by the band before their six-year break-up that started in January 2010.

On March 12, 2015 the album was re-released on limited edition, hand numbered cassettes.

== Track listing ==
No.	Title	Length
1.	"Glory Kingdom"	2:26
2.	"Given Life"	4:21
3.	"To Catch a Tiger..."	4:45
4.	"Marvin's Jungle"	3:20
5.	"The Garden's All Nighters"	5:23
6.	"...If They Holler, Don't Let Go"	5:50
7.	"Retort, Rebuild, Remind"	4:37
8.	"The League of Endangered Oddities"	4:51
9.	"Serpentine"	1:23
10.	"I'll Make My Own Hours"	9:12

== Personnel ==
The Number Twelve Looks Like You

- Jesse Korman – vocals
- Justin Pedrick – vocals
- Alexis Pareja – guitar
- Chris Russell – bass
- Jon Karel – drums

Production

- Produced by The Number Twelve Looks Like You
- Mixed by Steve Evetts
