= The Sun The Moon The Stars =

American stoner metal band

- Origin: Woodland Park, New Jersey, United States
- Genres: Stoner Metal, Doom Metal
- Years active: 2009–present
- Label: The Black Numbers
- Spinoff of: The Oval Portrait
- Members: Matthew Dwyer; Joseph Ott III; Edward Bersano; Keith Hasselbrink
- Website: Official Site

The Sun The Moon The Stars are a stoner metal band from Woodland Park, New Jersey.

== History ==
Prior to the band's formation, frontman Matthew Dwyer began writing and demoing material in hopes of finding other musicians to accompany him. Eventually, he joined forces with old friends Joseph Ott on guitar, and Those Mockingbirds frontman Adam Bird on drums. The trio arranged and fine-tuned Dwyer's original compositions to prepare for a studio recording.

On Halloween 2009, the band released their debut 4-song EP, We Are The Swine, independently through Bandcamp and limited edition CD. The release was produced by Jayson DeZuzio (Coheed and Cambria, Skylar Grey) and recorded at Treehouse studios in Jersey City, NJ.

After recruiting former The Banner drummer Ian Mullen and bassist Dave Joyce, The Sun The Moon The Stars entered Stained Glass studios to record their first true EP, Mind Reader, in the fall of 2010. Shortly after, former The Oval Portrait guitarist E. Van Vogel replaced Joyce as bassist. The record was mixed and mastered by DeZuzio in 2011. An early preview attracted the attention of the label The Black Numbers, and was released March 6, 2012 on vinyl and digital download. The band supported the record on select dates with Maylene and The Sons Of Disaster and Lionize, as well as joining Planes Mistaken For Stars for dates on their reunion tour.

On August 14, 2012, The Sun The Moon The Stars released their cover of Cream's "Sunshine Of Your Love", a b-side from the Mind Reader recording sessions, as a free download.

The band spent the next few months writing their first full-length record, The God, and eventually attracting the attention of former The Number Twelve Looks Like You frontman-turned-producer, Jesse Korman. In the fall, they recorded 12 songs at Backroom Studios with Korman producing and Kevin Antreassian (Dillinger Escape Plan, Trophy Scars) as engineer. Korman and Antreassian's company, JK Productions, uploaded the song "To Dethrone A God" to SoundCloud for streaming in April 2013. This became the only song released, as Van Vogel and Mullen parted ways to pursue non-musical careers and Dwyer went on hiatus to Ecuador until the winter.

In 2014 the band, now joined by former Arson drummer Keith Hasselbrink and former The Murder And The Harlot guitarist Edward Bersano, continued playing live while writing another new record.

== Musical style and influences ==
Many reviews categorize the band's sound as high-energy metal akin to the likes of Black Sabbath, Iron Maiden, Motörhead, stoner metal groups such as High on Fire, Melvins, early Soundgarden and various other metal-influenced styles. Dwyer's shrieking razor-like vocals have been compared to those of late AC/DC frontman Bon Scott, while Ott's crisp guitar-playing has been deemed reminiscent of Zakk Wylde and Slash.

Dwyer's lyrics address diverse topics such as astral gods, the cosmos, and mysticism. The band is praised for taking a unique lyrical approach instead of succumbing to modern metal's typical "cheesy 80's satanism" or frustratingly vague themes.

The Sun The Moon The Stars takes its name from the lyrics to the Black Sabbath song "N.I.B.".

== Band members ==
Current members

- Matthew Dwyer – vocals/guitar (2009–present)
- Joseph Ott III – guitar (2009–present)
- Ian Mullen – bass (2014–present), drums (2009–2013),
- Keith Hasselbrink – drums (2013–present)

Former members

- Adam Bird – drums (2009)
- Dave Joyce – bass (2010–2012)
- E. Van Vogel – bass (2012–2013)
- Edward Bersano – bass (2013–2014)

== Discography ==
=== EPs ===
- Mind Reader (2012)
- We Are The Swine (2009)

=== Singles ===
- "Sunshine Of Your Love" (digital download, 2012)
