= The Oval Portrait (band) =

American rock band

- Origin: Paterson, New Jersey, USA
- Genres: post-hardcore, post-punk, psychedelic rock, experimental metal
- Years active: 2000-2004
- Label: Eyeball
- Spinoffs: Mermaid in a Manhole, The Sun The Moon The Stars
- Past members: Vincent Ardizzone; Dave Leporini; E. Van Vogel; Matthew Dwyer; Mike Iuele
- Website: www.myspace.com/theovalportrait

The Oval Portrait was an American rock band from West Paterson, New Jersey active in the early-to-mid-2000s. Their name was taken from a short story by Edgar Allan Poe. They released the LP "Life in Death" on Eyeball Records in 2003. The band's musical style contained an eclectic mix of influences ranging from post-hardcore and post-punk to psychedelic rock and experimental metal. The lyrical imagery on many songs contained bleak, unsettling subject matter and numerous literary references. "Life In Death" featured guest performances by Gerard Way of My Chemical Romance on the songs "Barnabus Collins Has More Skeletons in His Closet Than Vincent Price" and "From My Cold Dead Hands", the latter also featuring Sarah Balliet of Murder by Death. The group disbanded in 2004 with several members going on to form Mermaid in a Manhole and The Sun The Moon The Stars.

== Discography ==
- 2003: Life in Death, Eyeball Records.
