= Red of Tooth and Claw =

Studio album by Murder by Death
- Released: March 4, 2008
- Genres: Indie rock, country rock, country gothic, folk, Americana
- Length: 37:21
- Label: Vagrant
- Producer: Trina Shoemaker

Murder by Death chronology
In Bocca al Lupo (2006)	Red of Tooth and Claw (2008)	Good Morning, Magpie (2010)

Red of Tooth and Claw is the fourth full-length album by the American five-piece indie rock band Murder by Death, their first for the Vagrant record label. The title comes from a reference in Lord Tennyson's poem In Memoriam A.H.H. It was recorded by the Grammy-winning producer Trina Shoemaker at Dark Horse Recording Studio in Tennessee, and was released on March 4, 2008.

Red of Tooth and Claw is, as the singer/guitarist Adam Turla put it, a "Homer's Odyssey of revenge, only without the honorable character at the center." It is a concept album, and a prequel to their second album, Who Will Survive, and What Will Be Left of Them?

== Track listing ==
No.	Title	Length
1.	"Comin' Home"	3:35
2.	"Ball & Chain"	3:02
3.	"Rumbrave"	3:06
4.	"Fuego!"	4:11
5.	"Theme (for Ennio Morricone)"	2:49
6.	"A Second Opinion"	3:19
7.	"Steal Away"	2:05
8.	"Ash"	3:32
9.	"The Black Spot"	3:21
10.	"'52 Ford"	2:25
11.	"Spring Break 1899"	5:56

== Reception ==
Professional ratings
Aggregate scores
Source	Rating
Metacritic	70/100
Review scores
Source	Rating
AbsolutePunk	89%
AllMusic	4/5 stars
Alternative Press	4/5 stars
The A.V. Club	C+
Filter	84%
Punknews.org	3/5 stars
Sputnikmusic	3/5 stars

Critics compared Turla's vocals to those of Johnny Cash, Nick Cave and Nick Drake.

Overall, critical reception has been positive. The album has a score of 70% on Metacritic, indicating generally favorable reviews. Alternative Press gave the album four stars, writing, "They've finally realized their full potential..." AllMusic described "...a taut, tense, elegant delivery..." and gave the album four stars as well, stating "the band's combination of a taut, tense, elegant delivery and poetic lyrics breathes life into each of Red of Tooth and Claw's songs."

In a mixed review, Spin felt it "...runs low on contemporary touchstones or appeal." The A.V. Club gave the album a C+, stating it "envisions turbulence, stages it professionally, and downplays Murder By Death's power to frighten listeners and conjure up dust storms." Sputnikmusic criticized the album for sounding too similar to the previous album. Paste wrote that "the album triumphs on the sheer energy of the band’s performances—every one of them swirling, unapologetic tours-de-force."

== Personnel ==
Band

- Adam Turla – lead vocals, guitars, keyboards
- Sarah Balliet – cello
- Dagan Thogerson – drums, percussion
- Matt Armstrong – bass

Additional musicians and production

- Vincent Edwards – keyboards (on "Ball and Chain")
- Andrew Mendelson – mastering
- Eric Radoux – trumpet
- Geoff Piller – sound engineer
- Mike Paragone – mixing
- Trina Shoemaker – production, sound engineer, mixing
- William Sender – mixing
