= United Nations (United Nations album) =

- Original controversial cover art, limited to 1,000 copies.

Studio album by United Nations
- Released: September 9, 2008
- Recorded: 2007–2008
- Studio: Big Blue Meenie (Jersey City)
- Genre: Hardcore punk; screamo; powerviolence
- Length: 38:22
- Label: Eyeball
- Producer: Tim Gilles

United Nations chronology
United Nations (2008)	Never Mind the Bombings, Here's Your Six Figures (2010)

Professional ratings
Review scores
Source	Rating
AbsolutePunk	82%
Metal.de	8/10
Ox-Fanzine	4.5/5 stars
Sputnikmusic	4.0/5
Wonka Vision	2/5 stars

United Nations is the debut studio album by American hardcore punk band United Nations, released on September 9, 2008, through Eyeball Records. The band features members from numerous prolific bands, such as Geoff Rickly of Thursday. Due to contractual obligations of other members, the official lineup of the band is not known.

== Release ==
The album cover was designed by Jimmy Cauty of the KLF. The album received a limited edition CD release that was only available through the Eyeball Records webstore. Only 1,000 copies were sold. The album was not released in stores because of copyright issues with the cover image, which is essentially the same image used for the Beatles' Abbey Road, but with the Beatles engulfed in flames. One retail store, Hot Topic destroyed about 7000 copies of the CDs because the store had ordered the album without knowing about the album's copyright violations; due to a no return policy, the store could not return them. Staff from the store sent pictures to the band of themselves destroying the CDs. The album was also released on vinyl, pressing was limited to 1,000 copies on red vinyl.

=== 2015 Reissue ===
In 2015, Temporary Residence Limited and Rickly's label Collect Records reissued the album on vinyl with updated packaging that parodied The Beatles' 1968 self-titled album. The reissue contained a sticker which read:

"Cease& Desist& Destroy& Reissue. The controversial debut album reissued with original banned artwork. Now expanded for maximum litigation. Includes infinite bonus track with high-quality download. Limited edition until we get sued. Again."

== Track listing ==
No.	Title	Length
1.	"The Spinning Heart of the YO-YO Lobby"	0:57
2.	"Resolution #9"	2:30
3.	"No Sympathy for a Sinking Ship"	2:06
4.	"The Shape of Punk that Never Came"	2:36
5.	"My Cold War"	1:49
6.	"Model UN"	1:08
7.	"Filmed in Front of a Live Studio Audience"	3:40
8.	"Revolutions in Graphic Design"	2:04
9.	"I Keep Living the Same Day"	1:00
10.	"Subliminal Testing"	2:14
11.	"Say Goodbye to General Figment of the USS Imagination"	5:10
12.	Untitled	13:00

Notes

- The song "Subliminal Testing" can be played backwards to reveal other lyrics that simply tell the listener to turn the song back around.
- The hidden track is 12:59 of silence, followed by the sound of a cash register.

== Personnel ==
United Nations
Due to contractual obligations the official lineup of the band is not known.

Additional musicians

- Billy Horn – tenor saxophone on track 11
- Geoff Rickly - vocals

Production

- Executive Producer Tim Gilles
- Mixed by Matt Messenger
- Mastered by Alan Douches at West West Side Music
- Tracked by Kevin Neaton
- Additional Tracking by Al Eddings and Matt Messenger
- Assisted by Juan Martinez, Giavonni Escamilla, and Matt Menafro

Artwork

- Artwork by Sons of Nero
- Design (on reissue) by Jeremy DeVine

== Charts ==
Chart	Peak position
US Independent Albums	44
US Heatseekers Albums	14
