= Like the Exorcist, but More Breakdancing =

Studio album by Murder by Death
- Released: June 25, 2002
- Studios: Acme Studio, Chicago, IL
- Genres: Emo; post-hardcore; post-rock; indie rock; indie folk; gothic country; alt-country
- Length: 43:29
- Label: Eyeball
- Producer: Tim Iseler

Murder by Death chronology
Little Joe Gould (2001)	Like the Exorcist, but More Breakdancing (2002)	Who Will Survive, and What Will Be Left of Them? (2003)

Professional ratings
Review scores
Source	Rating
Allmusic	2.5/5 stars
Sputnik Music	4.5/5 stars
Punknews.org	4/5 stars

Like the Exorcist, but More Breakdancing is the first full-length album by Indiana indie rock band Murder by Death. It was released in June 2002 by Eyeball Records.

== Track listing ==
No.	Title	Length
1.	"Those Who Stayed"	3:58
2.	"I'm Afraid of Who's Afraid of Virginia Wolfe"	3:43
3.	"A Caucus Race"	3:30
4.	"You Are the Last Dragon (You Possess the Power of the Glow)"	3:13
5.	"Joe Bou"	3:32
6.	"Flamenco's Fuckin' Easy"	4:12
7.	"Intergalactic Menopause"	4:50
8.	"Those Who Left"	8:25
9.	"Holy Lord, Shawshank Redemption Is Such a Good Movie"	6:14
10.	"Untitled" (hidden track)	1:52

== Personnel ==
Murder by Death

- Adam Turla – vocals, guitar, keyboards
- Matt Armstrong – bass
- Vincent Edwards – keyboards, samples
- Sarah Balliet – cello
- Alex Schrodt – drums, percussion
