= In Bocca al Lupo (album) =

Studio album by Murder by Death
- Released: May 23, 2006
- Genre: Indie rock • gothic country • alternative country • folk rock
- Length: 44:08
- Label: Tent Show Records
- Producer: J. Robbins, Murder by Death

Murder by Death chronology
Who Will Survive, and What Will Be Left of Them? (2003)	In Bocca al Lupo (2006)	Red of Tooth and Claw (2008)

Professional ratings
Review scores
Source	Rating
AllMusic	4/5 stars
PopMatters	7/10 stars

In Bocca al Lupo is the third full-length album release by indie rock band Murder by Death. It was released on Tent Show Records, on May 23, 2006. The title comes from the Italian phrase that literally translates to "into the mouth of the wolf" and is commonly used to say "Good luck". The album is a concept album, which essentially means the songs are all connected by themes, in this case, sin and punishment.

Guitarist and lead singer, Adam Turla, explains the meaning of the first five songs on the band's website much like he did for their previous album, Who Will Survive, and What Will Be Left of Them?. The following excerpt is taken from his introduction:

While the last record is one long story, the new record is 12 different stories, all about sin, redemption, and guilt. Think of them like short stories in one anthology, each about a different character who has either committed acts that have harmed other people or are part of a bigger story where something like that has happened. There were several books that were influential in writing this album. Some of them were Dante's Inferno, Herman Melville's Benito Cereno, and Edgar Allan Poe's Fall of the House of Usher. Basically all these stories had issues that seemed relevant to the record and helped the creation of these songs.

== Track listing ==
No.	Title	Length
1.	"Boy Decide"	3:19
2.	"One More Notch"	3:10
3.	"Dead Men and Sinners"	1:59
4.	"Brother"	3:52
5.	"Dynamite Mine"	3:23
6.	"The Organ Grinder"	2:44
7.	"Sometimes the Line Walks You"	2:53
8.	"Raw Deal"	4:04
9.	"The Big Sleep"	4:30
10.	"Shiola"	4:17
11.	"Steam Rising"	4:13
12.	"The Devil Drives"	5:44

== Personnel ==
Band

- Adam Turla – vocals, guitars, production, layout
- Matt Armstrong – bass, production, layout
- Sarah Balliet – cello, keyboards, production, layout
- Alex Schrodt – drums, percussion, production, layout

Guest musicians and production

- J. Robbins – backing vocals (tracks 5 and 9), sound engineer, production, mastering, mixing
- David A. Miller – tuba, trombone, (tracks 6 and 7), backing vocals (tracks 9 and 12)
- Ronald Rolling – trumpet (tracks 6, 7 and 9), backing vocals (tracks 9 and 12)
- Shundra S. Johnson – backing vocals (tracks 9 and 12)
- Marvin Parks – backing vocals (tracks 9 and 12)
- Janet Morgan – backing vocals (tracks 9 and 12)
- Alan Douches – mastering
- Mike Pappa – cover art
- Ben Bussell – artwork
- Inertia Unlimited – layout
