= Who Will Survive, and What Will Be Left of Them? =

Studio album by Murder by Death
- Released: October 14, 2003
- Genre: Indie rock • gothic country • alternative country • post-rock • chamber pop
- Length: 42:15
- Label: Eyeball Records

Murder by Death chronology
Like the Exorcist, but More Breakdancing (2002)	Who Will Survive, and What Will Be Left of Them? (2003)	In Bocca al Lupo (2006)

Professional ratings
Review scores
Source	Rating
AllMusic	2.5/5 stars
Punk News	4/5 stars
Sputnik Music	4.5/5 stars

Who Will Survive, and What Will Be Left of Them? is the second full-length release by indie rock band Murder by Death. It was released on Eyeball Records in 2003. Its title is a reference to the tagline of the 1974 film The Texas Chain Saw Massacre.

== Background ==
It is a concept album based around the Devil and a small Mexican border town against which he wages war.

On the band's , Adam Turla, the band's guitarist, lead singer, and principal lyricist explained the meanings of all the songs on the album. The following is his introduction to the explanations:

I guess the first thing I should say is that this album is not trying to be artsy, or profound or anything more than the story it is. It's meant to entertain, bring the feeling of sitting around telling ghost stories or something. Also, I'm a religious studies major, so I tied in a lot of weird religious stuff. This is just a story, there's no religious affiliation on our parts. So there's my disclaimer.

== Track listing ==
No.	Title	Length
1.	"The Devil in Mexico" (Featuring Gerard Way of My Chemical Romance)	5:22
2.	"Killbot 2000" (Featuring Geoff Rickly of Thursday)	3:43
3.	"Until Morale Improves, the Beatings Will Continue" (Featuring William Elliott Whitmore)	3:57
4.	"Three Men Hanging"	3:47
5.	"Intermission"	1:14
6.	"A Masters in Reverse Psychology"	3:13
7.	"The Desert is on Fire"	3:11
8.	"That Crown Don't Make You a Prince"	4:00
9.	"Pillars of Salt"	4:45
10.	"End of the Line"	9:03

== Credits ==
Band

- Matt Armstrong – bass
- Sarah Balliet – cello
- Vincent Edwards – keyboards, samples, design
- Alex Schrodt – drums, percussion
- Adam Turla – vocals, guitars

Additional personnel

- D. James Goodwin – recording engineer, mixing
- Chris Powers – additional engineer
- Sean Price – additional engineer
- Chris Gehringer – mastering
- Drew James – art, typography
- Gerard Way – vocals (track 1)
- Geoff Rickly – vocals (track 2)
- William Elliott Whitmore – vocals (track 3)
