= Nuclear. Sad. Nuclear. =

Studio album by The Number Twelve Looks Like You
- Released: June 7, 2005
- Recorded: The Clubhouse, New York, March 2005
- Genres: Mathcore, math rock
- Length: 38:47
- Label: Eyeball
- Producer: D. James Goodwin

The Number Twelve Looks Like You chronology
Put on Your Rosy Red Glasses (2003)	Nuclear. Sad. Nuclear. (2005)	Mongrel (2007)

Professional ratings
Review scores
Source	Rating
Allmusic	link
Lambgoat	link
Punknews.org	link

Nuclear. Sad. Nuclear. is the second studio album by American mathcore band the Number Twelve Looks Like You. It is their first album on Eyeball Records. The album was released on vinyl on October 23, 2007.

On May 12, 2015, the album was re-released on limited edition, hand numbered cassettes.

== Track listing ==
No.	Title	Length
1.	"The Devil's Dick Disaster"	3:22
2.	"Texas Dolly"	2:59
3.	"Clarissa Explains Cuntainment"	3:00
4.	"Track Four"	0:32
5.	"The Proud Parent's Convention Held in the ER"	2:34
6.	"An Aptly Fictional Description"	5:29
7.	"Like a Cat"	3:27
8.	"Remembrance Dialogue"	6:58
9.	"An Exercise in Self Portraiture: Go Shoot Yourself"	1:52
10.	"Operating on a Re-Run Episode"	2:51
11.	"Track Eleven"	0:35
12.	"Category"	5:08
