= The Meek Shall Inherit What's Left =

Studio album by Kiss Kiss
- Released: July 7, 2009
- Genre: Progressive rock
- Length: 45:00
- Label: Eyeball Records

Kiss Kiss chronology
Reality vs. the Optimist (2007)	The Meek Shall Inherit What's Left (2009)

Professional ratings
Review scores
Source	Rating
AbsolutePunk.net	(87%) link
Decoymusic	link
Sputnikmusic	link

The Meek Shall Inherit What's Left is the second album by Kiss Kiss, released on July 7, 2009, on Eyeball Records.

== Track listing ==
1. "The Best Mistake" (2:53)
2. "Plague #11" (2:24)
3. "Haunted By The Beauty Of An Imperfection" (0:35)
4. "All They Draw" (2:56)
5. "Innocent I (The Corruption Of Self Through The Introduction Of Naturally Existing Self Producing Chemicals)" (2:22)
6. "Innocent II (A Drop From The Ethereal; Swimming Towards The Crescent Moon)" (3:31)
7. "IIIIIIIIIIII" (2:22)
8. "Hate" (4:04)
9. "Through The Day" (2:58)
10. "If They Only Knew" (4:59)
11. "Virus" (15:56)
