= Kiss Kiss (band) =

US Indie rock band

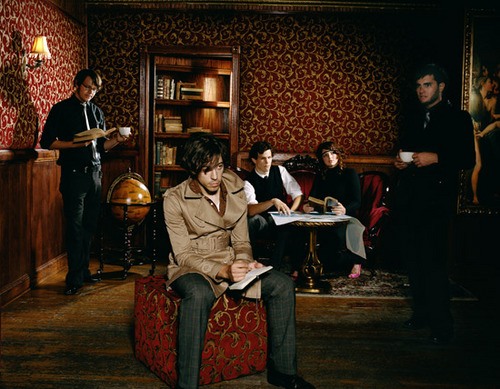

Background information
- Origin: Milton, New York, US
- Genres: Indie rock; art rock; dark cabaret; progressive rock; experimental rock
- Years active: 2003–2010
- Labels: Astro Magnetics, Eyeball
- Past members: Josh Benash; Jared Karns; Mike Abiuso; Rebecca Schlappich; James O'Keeffe; Sam Oatts; Bob Pycior; Evan Crow; James Wolff; Lacy Rostyak; Jonathan Jetter; Pat Lamothe; Patrick Southern

Kiss Kiss was an American indie rock band formed by Joshua Benash (guitar, synth, vocals) and Jared Karns (drums), with their first album released in February 2007. Although their music is primarily indie in style, it also includes an electric violin.

== History ==
The band first formed at the State University of New York at Purchase, where Joshua Benash and Jared Karns had previously played in other bands. The band took their name from a series of short stories by Roald Dahl.

Their debut full-length album, Reality vs. The Optimist, was released on February 6, 2007, under the New Jersey–based Eyeball Records. However, it had been recorded and prepared for release many months earlier, and several music tracks had leaked onto the Internet by November 2006. A "tour edition" of the CD, limited to 1,000 copies, was sold at shows between the November leak of the album and the February release date.

A blog post on the band's Myspace page, on August 7, 2008, stated that the band's second full-length album, The Meek Shall Inherit What's Left, was almost complete and expected to be released in early 2009. A special edition re-release of Reality vs. The Optimist was planned for late 2008, but information regarding its release has since been removed from the Eyeball Records website.

The album The Meek Shall Inherit What's Left was officially released on July 7, 2009.

On January 7, 2011, Josh Benash announced a side project called "Vuvuzela" with some of the members of Kiss Kiss.

=== Musical influences ===
Kiss Kiss has a range of various musical influences, which include: The Beach Boys, Erik Satie, Björk, Blonde Redhead, Godspeed You! Black Emperor, Igor Stravinsky, Mogwai, Neutral Milk Hotel, Tiny Tim, Tripping Daisy, The Kingston Trio, early Motown, The Olivia Tremor Control, Ramona Cordova, Hollywood Bukkake, Circulatory System, Radiohead, Mr. Bungle, Nirvana, Muse, Murder by Death, Cursive, The Turtles, Queen, and At the Drive-In.

=== Former members ===
- Josh Benash – guitar, vocals, synthesizer
- Mike Abiuso – guitar, synthesizer, vocals
- Jared Karns – drums
- Rebecca "Beckster" Schlappich – electric violin
- James O'Keeffe – bass
- Sam Oatts – bass
- Benjamin Jon- bass
- Bob Pycior – violin
- Evan Crow – guitar, synthesizer
- James Wolff – electric violin, guitar
- Lacy Rostyak – electric violin, vocals
- Jonathan Jetter – guitar
- Pat Lamothe – bass
- Patrick Southern – bass

== Discography ==
Date of Release	Title	Label
October 11, 2005	Kiss Kiss EP	Eyeball Records
February 6, 2007	Reality vs. the Optimist	Eyeball Records
July 7, 2009	The Meek Shall Inherit What's Left	Eyeball Records

=== Singles ===
Year	Title	Album
2007	"Machines"	Reality vs. the Optimist
2007	"Satellite"	Reality vs. the Optimist
2009	"All They Draw"	The Meek Shall Inherit What's Left
2009	"Innocent I"	The Meek Shall Inherit What's Left

=== Music videos ===
Year	Title	Album
2007	"Machines"	Reality vs. the Optimist
2007	"The Cats in Your House"	Reality vs. the Optimist
2009	"Innocent I"	The Meek Shall Inherit What's Left
2009	"Plague #11"	The Meek Shall Inherit What's Left
2010	"All They Draw"	The Meek Shall Inherit What's Left
