= Secret Lives of the Freemasons =

American post-hardcore band

Secret Lives! Of The Freemasons
- Origin: Asheville, North Carolina
- Genres: Post-hardcore
- Years active: 2003–2008
- Labels: Victory Records Eyeball Records, Astro Magnetics

Secret Lives! Of The Freemasons or alternatively "Secret Lives!" was a band from Asheville, North Carolina. They formed in Asheville in 2003 after the breakup of two other local bands, A Kiss Before Dying and Throwing Myself. In 2004 the group signed with Astro Magnetics (partly owned by Geoff Rickly of Thursday), who released their 2005 full-length; the group left the label in June 2007, and the next month signed with Victory Records. They have toured nationally with such groups as He Is Legend, Scary Kids Scaring Kids, The Sleeping and Envy On the Coast.

== Members ==
Current

- Cliff Brien Worsham - Lead vocals, keys (2003-2008)
- Jim Debardi - Guitar, keys, vocals (2003-2008)
- Tucker Ensley - Guitar (2003-2008)
- Josh Carden - Bass (2003-2008)
- Travis Moss - Drums (2003-2008)

Past

- Justin Elrod - Guitar, vocals (2003-2007)

== Discography ==
- The Cut And Thrust Of Clear Thinking (Divisional Media, EP, 2004)
- This Was Built To Make You Dance (Astro Magnetics, 2005)

   1. Dance!
   2. Make Like A Door And Shut Up
   3. It Only Took A Whisper
   4. A Song Of Hope
   5. Glazed Over Eyes Never Lie
   6. To The Barricades
   7. This Was Built To Make You Dance (The Dance Dance Revolution)
   8. If It Weren't For Pickpockets, I'd Have No Sexlife At All
   9. And Then A Hurricane
   10. I Fought The Broad (And The Broad Won)
   11. How To Beat A Dead Horse
   12. Less 'Tude, More Dude
   13. Sweet Bonus Mosh

- Weekend Warriors (Victory Records, February 19, 2008)

   1. Chug And Leave
   2. Mascara
   3. Dirty Laundry
   4. The New Whack
   5. Feels Like Home
   6. Why We Run
   7. Airplanes
   8. There's Wolves Out There
   9. Painting Monsters
   10. The Death Of...
   11. Xanax
   12. Life Begins At 40oz.

== Music videos ==
- It Only Took A Whisper
- Life Begins At 40 oz.
