= Good Morning, Magpie =

Studio album by Murder by Death
- Released: April 6, 2010
- Length: 37:24
- Label: Vagrant Records
- Producer: Jake Belser

Murder by Death chronology
Red of Tooth and Claw (2008)	Good Morning, Magpie (2010)	Bitter Drink, Bitter Moon (2012)

Professional ratings
Review scores
Source	Rating
AbsolutePunk.net	88% link
AllMusic	4/5 stars
Sputnikmusic	4/5

Good Morning, Magpie is an album by American indie rock band Murder By Death. It was released on April 6, 2010. It is their second release through Vagrant Records.

== Track listing ==
No.	Title	Length
1.	"Kentucky Bourbon"	0:34
2.	"As Long as There Is Whiskey in the World"	3:15
3.	"On the Dark Streets Below"	2:36
4.	"King of the Gutters, Prince of the Dogs"	4:43
5.	"Piece by Piece"	4:28
6.	"Good Morning, Magpie"	5:24
7.	"You Don't Miss Twice (When You're Shavin' With a Knife)"	2:36
8.	"Yes"	2:23
9.	"Foxglove"	3:06
10.	"White Noise"	4:53
11.	"The Day"	3:33
Total length:		37:24

== Personnel ==
- Adam Turla – lead vocals, guitars, keyboards
- Sarah Balliet – cello
- Dagan Thogerson – drums, percussion
- Matt Armstrong – bass
