= Field Songs (William Elliott Whitmore album) =

Studio album by William Elliott Whitmore
- Released: July 12, 2011
- Studios: Flat Black, Iowa
- Genres: Country; folk; Americana
- Length: 34:08
- Label: Anti

William Elliott Whitmore chronology
Animals in the Dark (2009)	Field Songs (2011)	Radium Death (2015)

Field Songs is the fifth studio album by American country singer William Elliott Whitmore. It was released on July 12, 2011, by Anti-.

== Critical reception ==
Professional ratings
Aggregate scores
Source	Rating
AnyDecentMusic?	7.5/10
Metacritic	83/100
Review scores
Source	Rating
AllMusic	4.5/5 stars
Alternative Press	4/5 stars
The A.V. Club	B
Blurt	6/10
Mojo	4/5 stars
Paste	7.9/10
Pitchfork	7.5/10
PopMatters	8/10

Field Songs was met with "universal acclaim" reviews from critics. At Metacritic, which assigns a weighted average rating out of 100 to reviews from mainstream publications, this release received an average score of 83 based on 11 reviews. Aggregate website AnyDecentMusic? gave the release a 7.5 out of 10 based on a critical consensus of 9 reviews.

In a review for AllMusic, critic reviewer Thom Jurek wrote: "By using numerous historical and societal references in these songs as signifiers, and small actions that resulted in large changes, Field Songs is 21st century folk music in the literal sense because it is linked to folk's tradition of social conscience across racial and class barriers>" At The A.V. Club, Jason Heller noted that Whitmore's voice is "an increasingly formidable piece of weaponry", going on to say "accompanied by the chirping of crickets or birds, each song reins in Whitmore's craggy, righteous howl, calming it with gentle strums and the weary plucking of acoustic guitar and banjo." Writing for Delusions of Adequacy, Jenn O'Donnell explained: "Field Songs is as simple and straightforward as a folk album could ever be. Simple banjo and guitar with the slightest amount of percussion, a voice, and something to say is all Whitmore needs to give his audience goose bumps or tears."

== Track listing ==
Field Songs track listing
No.	Title	Length
1.	"Bury Your Burdens in the Ground"	5:13
2.	"Field Song"	3:43
3.	"Don't Need It"	3:33
4.	"Everything Gets Gone"	4:15
5.	"Let's Don Something Impossible"	3:20
6.	"Get There from Here"	3:56
7.	"We'll Carry On"	4:03
8.	"Not Feeling Any Pain"	6:02

iTunes Deluxe edition
No.	Title	Length
9.	"From the Cellar Door to the Gallows"	3:12
10.	"Midnight"	3:24
11.	"Lift My Jug"	3:45
12.	"The Chariot"	3:28

== Charts ==
Chart performance for Field Songs
Chart (2011)	Peak position
US Americana/Folk Albums (Billboard)	24
US Heatseekers Albums (Billboard)	24
