= The Stiletto Formal =

Rock and roll band

- Origin: Phoenix, Arizona, United States
- Genres: Post-hardcore, progressive rock, experimental rock, sasscore
- Years active: 2004–2009
- Label: Eyeball Records
- Members: Kyle Howard; Paul Neely; Sunny Davis; Jimi Lamp; Pat McCarthy
- Website: http://www.myspace.com/thestilettoformal

The Stiletto Formal was a self-proclaimed "eccentric rock and roll" band from Phoenix, Arizona, and were one of the few rock bands featuring a cello and other exotic instruments and effects as an integral part of their sound. In addition to these qualities and unusual time signatures, Kyle Howard's falsetto provided distinction in their music. Their lyrics are often constructed into a short story format. They had gained a local fanbase in Arizona and were attracting national attention after playing nationwide tours and appearing on the Vans Warped Tour; however, band frontman Kyle Howard relocated to Los Angeles in 2009, and the group's Facebook and Myspace profiles have since been devoid of group activity.

In addition to their two released EPs, Masochism in the Place of Romance and This Is My Boomstick, the band has four unreleased songs: "The Everlasting Gaze," a cover of a song originally performed by The Smashing Pumpkins; two demos, "This Song Can't Be About Blowing Things Up Because Of Terrorism" and "Moonshine"; and a song titled "Botox in Bulk," which was never recorded.

Their debut album is titled ¡Fiesta Fiesta Fiesta Fiesta!, which is self-described as being "dark but still upbeat" with sound engineer Nigel Godrich (Radiohead) as sound engineer. It was released on October 21, 2008. They worked with producers Cory Spotts (Job For A Cowboy, Greeley Estates) and Darrell Thorp (Radiohead, Outkast, Beck) for the album, which was released on Eyeball Records.

== Final lineup ==
- Kyle Howard - Vocals, Percussion, Keyboard
- Paul Neely - Bass, Percussion, Keyboard
- Sunny Davis - Cello, Shaker
- Jimi Lamp - Guitar
- Pat McCarthy - Drums

== Former members ==
- Nole Kennedy - Drums
- Drew Domm - Drums
- Shelly Barnes - Keyboard, Vocals, Percussion
- Brady Leffler - Keyboard

== Discography ==
- Masochism in the Place of Romance EP (2005)
- This Is My Boomstick EP (2006)
- ¡Fiesta Fiesta Fiesta Fiesta! (October 21, 2008)
