= The Next Four Years =

Studio album by United Nations
- Released: July 15, 2014
- Genre: Screamo; post-hardcore
- Length: 29:42
- Label: Temporary Residence

United Nations chronology
Never Mind the Bombings, Here's Your Six Figures (2010)	The Next Four Years (2014)

The Next Four Years is the second studio album by the American rock band United Nations. The album was released on July 15, 2014, through Temporary Residence Limited. Prior to the release of The Next Four Years, United Nations released "Serious Business" and "Meanwhile on Main Street" for online streaming.

== Release formats ==
=== Box set ===
While the album was released in more traditional formats, The Next Four Years was meant to be experienced as a boxed set. The boxed-set version was limited to 1,000 copies that were hand-assembled by the members of United Nations, and features all 11 tracks found on other formats, but split between a cassette tape, a 10" vinyl record and two 7" vinyl records. The cover art of the boxed set features fake news articles and the cassette tape was wrapped in a copy of the actual cease-and-desist letter sent by the actual United Nations. As a boxed set, the series of different formats are meant be a concept album that illustrates and critiques the evolution of the band members themselves from an underground basement act to an experimental. United Nations vocalist Geoff Rickly explained: "This record is more developed and mature because we decided that the best form of critique isn't political or punk critique; it's critiquing ourselves. So the record is a lot more personal—a lists of all the ways we've failed all the things we once believed in, and accepting the status quo of how band things have gotten. It's sort of examining our own level of privilege. The box set is supposed to be a fake mythology of the band. The cassette is the first demo—the band at its most basic—then there's the two 7-inches, and the 10-inch is where we get into our pretentious phase of trying to sound like Godspeed [You! Black Emperor]."

=== CD, LP and digital ===
The CD, 12" vinyl LP and digital versions of The Next Four Years feature the same tracks as the boxed set and cover art inspired by Black Flag's 1983 compilation album, The First Four Years.

== Reception ==
Professional ratings
Aggregate scores
Source	Rating
Metacritic	73/100
Review scores
Source	Rating
Alternative Press	3.5/5 stars
Pitchfork	8.1/10.0

The Next Four Years received generally positive reviews from music critics. At Metacritic, which assigns a normalized rating out of 100 to reviews from music critics, the album received an average score of 73, which indicates "Generally favorable reviews," based on 5 reviews.

== Track listing ==
No.	Title	Length
1.	"Serious Business"	3:06
2.	"Meanwhile on Main Street"	3:00
3.	"Revolutions at Varying Speeds"	2:54
4.	"False Flags"	1:19
5.	"United Nations Find God"	1:33
6.	"Between Two Mirrors"	2:42
7.	"Fuck the Future"	0:59
8.	"Stole the Past"	1:50
9.	"United Nations Vs. United Nations"	2:22
10.	"F#A#$"	7:12
11.	"Music for Changing Parties"	2:45

=== Box set ===
==== 7" vinyl ====
1. "Serious Business" – 3:06
2. "Meanwhile on Main Street" – 3:00

==== 7" vinyl ====
1. "Revolutions at Varying Speeds" – 2:54
2. "False Flags" – 1:19
3. "United Nations Find God" – 1:33
4. "Between Two Mirrors" – 2:42

==== Cassette ====
1. "Fuck the Future" – 0:59
2. "Stole the Past" – 1:50
3. "United Nations Vs. United Nations" – 2:22

==== 10" vinyl ====
1. "F#A#$" – 7:12
2. "Music for Changing Parties" – 2:45

Notes

- Track duration on CD for Track 11 is 3:23.

== Personnel ==
United Nations

- David Haik
- Geoff Rickly
- Jonah Bayer
- Lukas Previn
- Zac Sewell
