= Pompeii (band) =

American indie rock band

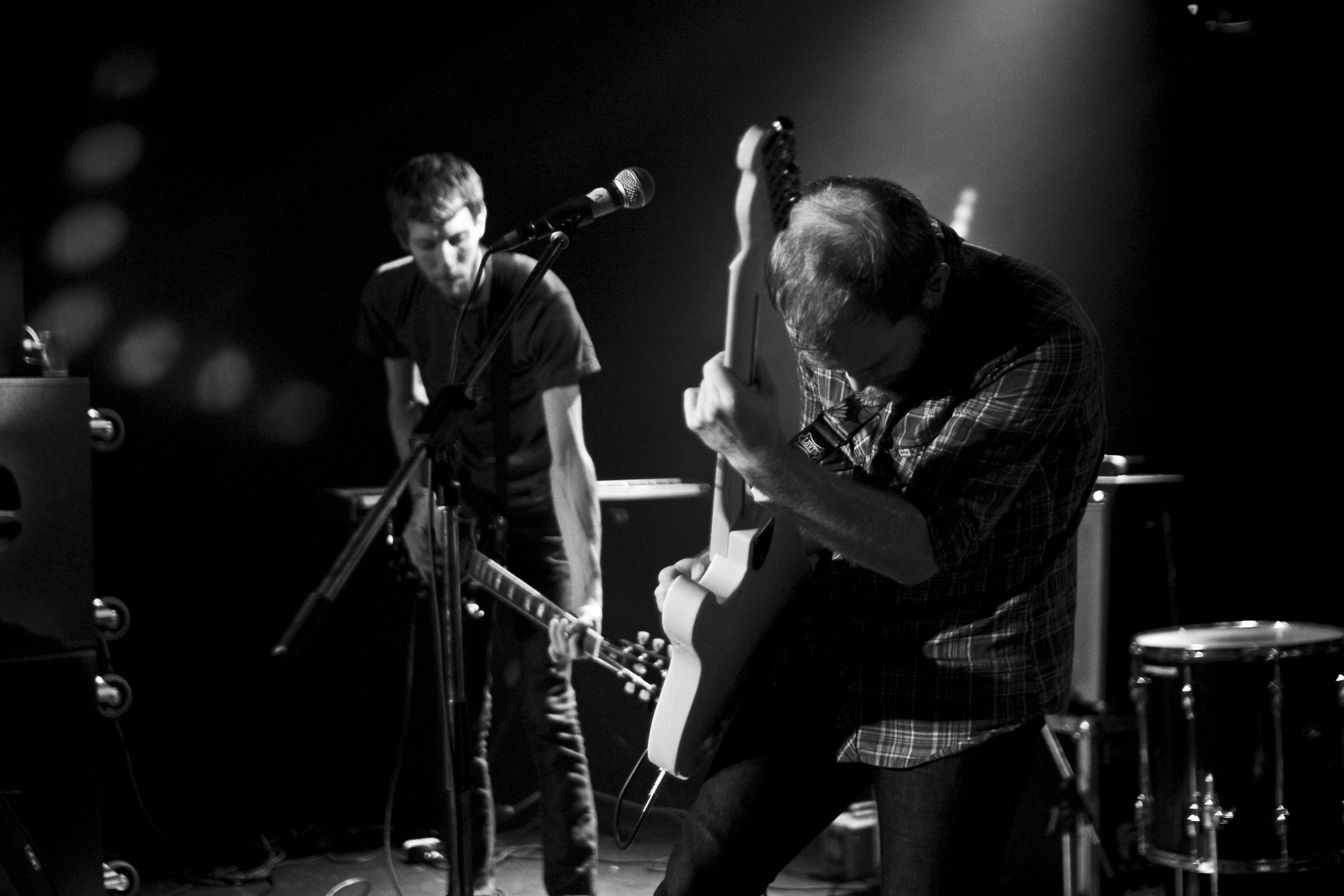
- Pompeii

Background information
- Origin: Austin, Texas, United States of America
- Genres: Indie rock, post-rock
- Years active: 2004–2016
- Labels: Eyeball Records (2005–2011); Red Eye Transit (2014-2016)
- Past members: Caitlin Bailey; Shane Stevens; Dean Stafford; Erik Johnson; Rob Davidson; Colin Butler

Pompeii was an American indie rock band active from 2004 to 2016 comprising Dean Stafford (vocals, guitar), Erik Johnson (guitar, keyboards), Colin Butler (bass), and Rob Davidson (drums). Formed in Austin, Texas in 2004, the band is best known for their melodic and ambient rock sound, which features the addition of classical strings. Pompeii's style is noted as having a saturated ambient, elegant sound. Pompeii have received international attention and critical acclaim from outlets such as The New York Times, The Guardian, The Chicago Tribune, American Songwriter, Stereogum, NPR, Apple, Under the Radar, and MTV, as well as their song "Where We're Going, We Don't Need Roads" being played during the ending scene of The Giant Mechanical Man.

== History ==
Dean Stafford and Rob Davidson grew up playing music together in Corpus Christi, Texas. In 2002, they moved to Austin, Texas to attend St. Edward's University where they formed Pompeii with bassist Shane Stevens, before adding cellist Caitlin Bailey. While looking for a keyboard player, the band met guitarist Erik Johnson, who came up with the name Pompeii. In 2007, Stevens left the band to focus on starting a family. After filling in on tour, bassist Colin Butler joined the band permanently in 2007.

Pompeii has toured extensively, alongside groups such as The Appleseed Cast, The Velvet Teen, Headlights, Caspian, Mates of State, This Will Destroy You, and Simian Ghost. The band has been compared to Death Cab For Cutie and Sigur Rós, more specifically the similarities between singer Dean Stafford’s vocals and Ben Gibbard’s.

=== Assembly ===
Pompeii released their debut album Assembly in 2006 to moderate success and critical acclaim. It was produced, recorded, and mixed by D. James Goodwin at The Clubhouse studio in Rhinebeck, New York. The first track "Ten Hundred Lights" was used in a Toyota commercial. NPR featured "Miracle Mile" as their "Song of the Day". The song was also used in the MTV reality television show Teen Mom. "Interlude (for Smith)" was featured in an episode of MTV's 16 and Pregnant as well as on MTV's Beavis and Butthead. The mellotron at the end of "Relative is Relative" is the same one used by David Bowie on the album Ziggy Stardust.

=== Nothing Happens for a Reason ===
The follow-up full-length Nothing Happens For A Reason was released on October 21, 2008. The album was produced, recorded and mixed by CJ Eiriksson at The Wire in Austin, Texas and Blue World Music in Dripping Springs, Texas. "Sit and Wait" was used in the "Switching Gears" episode of the reality television show Teen Mom. The song "Until You're Floating" was used in the episode "Curveball" of the show Teen Mom. "Where We're Going We Don't Need Roads" was used in an episode of Teen Mom called "Two Steps Forward" as well as in the movie The Giant Mechanical Man.

=== LOOM ===
The third album, LOOM, was released worldwide on October 14, 2014 via Red Eye Transit Records. The album was recorded and mixed by Erik Wofford at Cacophony Recorders in Austin, TX and mastered by Jeff Lipton at Peerless Mastering in Boston, MA. LOOM was produced by Erik Wofford and Pompeii. LOOM features guest appearances by both The Tosca String Quartet and Christopher King of This Will Destroy You. The music video for the single "Blueprint" was released on February 17, 2015, directed by Thor Brenne.

== Band members ==
- Dean Stafford – vocals, guitar (2004–2016)
- Erik Johnson – guitar, keyboard (2004–2016)
- Rob Davidson – drums (2004–2016)
- Colin Butler – bass (2007–2016)
- Caitlin Bailey – cello (2004–2009)
- Shane Stevens – bass (2004–2007)

== Discography ==
- Assembly (Eyeball Records, 2006)
- Nothing Happens for a Reason (Eyeball Records, 2008)
- LOOM (Red Eye Transit Records, 2014)

== Split ==
The band split in 2016 after releasing 3 albums over the span of 8 years, and being active for 12.

Dean Stafford is now a Seattle based indie dream pop artist with a solo project by the name of Early Internet.
