= Milemarker (band) =

American post-hardcore band

- Origin: Chapel Hill, North Carolina, U.S.
- Genre: Post-hardcore
- Years active: 1997–present
- Labels: Eyeball; Jade Tree; Paralogy, Stickfigure; Lovitt
- Members: Dave Laney; Ben Davis; Al Burian; Noah Leger; Monika Bukowska; Tim Remis; Greg Norman; John Bowman; Tony Lazzara
- Past members: Roby Newton; Sean Husick; Tim Herzog; Nandini Khaund; Patrick Zung; Joseph DeVeaugh-Geiss; Seth Freedman; Jeffery McGovern

Milemarker is an American post-hardcore group from North Carolina, United States.

Milemarker’s sound has ranged from experimental electronic to alternative rock. Formed in Chapel Hill, the band became a prominent part of the underground music scenes in both Chapel Hill and Chicago. They released albums including "Anaesthetic" in 2001 and "Ominosity" in 2005. The band took a hiatus between 2005 and 2008 but did not officially disband. They resumed with a European tour in 2008 and a US tour in 2017. Milemarker is also known for their wordplay and ironic lyrics that often address social issues. In addition, original members Al Burian and Dave Laney, along with Tim Remis, released an album under the side project Challenger in 2004.

== History ==
Milemarker originally formed in Chapel Hill, North Carolina. For a number of years they were part of the Chapel Hill and Chicago underground music scenes. The band became known for their eclectic stylings; their sound shifted from an experimental electronic format to heavier alternative rock in more recent years. Milemarker has also became known for their amateur pyrotechnics; their original drummer, Ben Davis, would set his cymbals ablaze, while frontman Al Burian would sometimes breathe fire.

In 2001 Milemarker released an album, Anaesthetic on the Jade Tree label. According to Dave Laney, the album deals with such themes as "gentrification, the atrocities of textile sweat shops, modern disconnection, terminal illness, and so on."

Milemarker released their album Ominosity in 2005, and embarked on a tour of the US in support. According to Burian, the band wanted to take their sound in a different direction, and Burian wanted to buck the "neo-new wave" tag that had been applied to the band. The end result was described by the The A.V. Club as "a more experimental strain of post-punk" compared to their previous releases.

From 2005 to 2008, although the band did not officially break up, circumstances prevented the band from further recording and touring. In 2008, the band played a show with the original line up of Al Burian, Dave Laney, and Ben Davis, and had a 12-date tour in Europe before playing at a musical festival in Lärz, Germany. They toured the US in 2017.

Milemarker often used word play and ironic lyrics in their songs. Examples include "Frigid Forms Sell You Warmth" ("there's a product line attached to every form of suicide") from 2000's Frigid Forms Sell; "A Quick Trip to the Clinic" ("died of pneumonia that I got on the walk to get my flu shot") from 2001's Anaesthetic; "From Russia With Love" ("everybody loves a good Red Scare") from 1999's Changing Caring Humans; and "Virtual Sex" ("it's not too personal to get personable with the personnel") from 2005's Ominosity. The title of the band's six-song EP Satanic Versus—including three tracks recorded by Steve Albini—is itself a play on Salman Rushdie's book "Satanic Verses". Milemarker also often employ a satirical or introspective slant toward social issues such as materialism ("Frigid Forms Sell You Warmth", "A Quick Trip to the Clinic", "Shrink To Fit"), technology ("Internet Relay Chat with the Central Intelligence Agency", "Server Error", "Ant Architect", "Virtual Sex"), and women's roles ("Food For Worms"), and have also referenced Orwellian ("New Lexicon") and apocalyptic ("Tundra", "Sun Out") themes.

Challenger, a more hard rock-oriented side project of Milemarker consisting of original members Al Burian and Dave Laney and newcomer Tim Remis, released their debut album Give People What They Want in Lethal Doses in 2004.

== Discography ==
=== Studio albums ===
- Non Plus Ultra (Paralogy, 1998)
- Future Isms (Stickfigure, 1998)
- Frigid Forms Sell (Jade Tree Records/Lovitt Records, 2000)
- Anaesthetic (Jade Tree Records, 2001)
- Satanic Versus (Jade Tree Records/Day After Records, 2002)
- Ominosity (Paralogy, 2005)
- Overseas (Lovitt Records, 2016)

=== Singles ===
- Receiver 7" (Clocked Out Records, 1998)
- Split 7" w/ The Blood Brothers (Boards Don't Hit Back Records, 1999)
- Sex Jams 7" (Bloodlink Records, 1999)
- Bomb Threat/From Russia With Love 7" (208 Records, 2000)
- Conditional Love 7" (Lovitt Records, 2015)

=== Other ===
- Changing Caring Humans (Stickfigure Records, 1999) - compilation
