= William Elliott Whitmore =

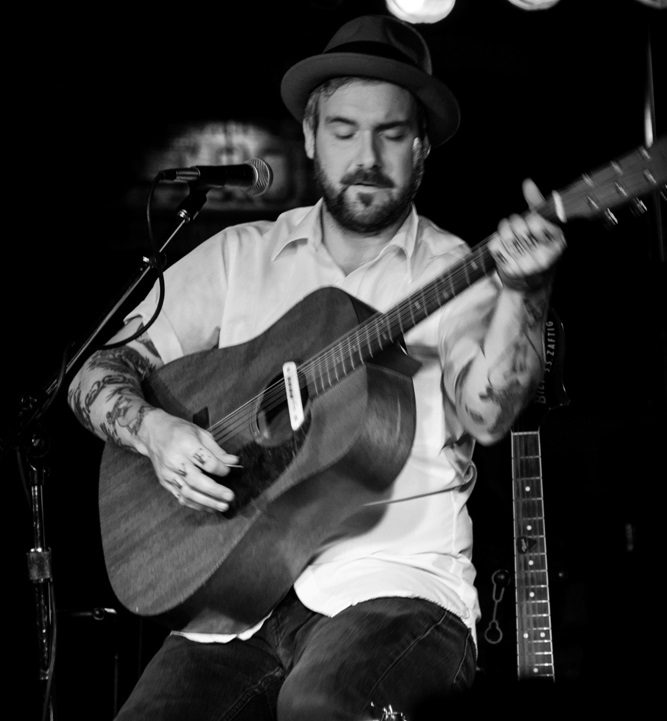
- Whitmore performing in 2015

Background information
- Also known as: W.E.W. Will Whitmore
- Born: William Elliott Whitmore; May 11, 1978 (age 48); Lee County, Iowa, U.S.
- Genres: Alternative country Blues; Folk music
- Occupation: Singer-songwriter
- Instruments: Vocals guitar banjo
- Years active: 1999–present
- Labels: Bloodshot Records; ANTI- Southern Records; Scenester Credentials
- Website: WilliamElliottWhitmore.com

William Elliott Whitmore (born May 11, 1978) is an American blues, country, folk singer and musician. He plays roots-folk music that is often inspired by his life on his family farm in the hills of southeastern Iowa.

== Early life and education ==
Whitmore grew up on a 160-acre horse farm in Lee County, Iowa, not far outside of Keokuk, Iowa. His parents, Elyse Whitmore (née Tweedy) and Harold Whitmore, were farmers, and the farm had been in his family since his third great-grandfather, who was an immigrant from Ireland. After his parents died, he converted the farm to row crops, which he leases to a neighboring farmer so he can be on the road to perform. He has an older brother and sister.

While he was growing up, the family was musical, with his dad playing the guitar, his mother playing the accordion and piano, and both his paternal and maternal grandfathers playing the banjo. Charley Pride and Willie Nelson were huge influences growing up. Whitmore sang from his earliest years, but when he was a teenager he began playing guitar, then eventually the banjo.

In addition to playing locally with a cousin, Whitmore, after a short stint in San Francisco, moved to Iowa City and got involved in the punk rock and the DIY scene, forming a band called Lost Cause.

In 1996, Whitmore graduated from Central Lee High School in Donnellson, Iowa.

== Career ==
When he was first starting out, Whitmore was a roadie for an Iowa City punk band called Ten Grand, but he eventually started performing as an opener for the band and toured extensively with Ten Grand. This led to him getting signed to the Chicago-based office of Southern Records. Whitmore said he turned to songwriting as a way to deal with the deaths of his parents, who died within a few years of each other, and the deaths of his grandparents.

Whitmore built a long-term relationship with Southern Records, releasing three records on the label. The three records on Southern, 2003's Hymns for the Hopeless, 2005's Ashes to Dust, and 2006's Song of the Blackbird, were a trilogy that were focused on death and his experience processing the deaths of those close to him. He recorded the records with Mike Lust at Phantom Manor in Chicago.

In 2009, Whitmore signed with mini-major ANTI-, where he released three records. The first record for ANTI-, 2009's Animals in the Dark, was a concept album. It reached Number 50 on the Billboard Heatseekers chart.

The song "Civilizations" off his 2015 record, Radium Death, is about how an oil pipeline running from South Dakota to Illinois was going to go through his grandmother's property on their farm.

In 2016, Whitmore worked with gold-selling recording artist Esmé Patterson, whom he had toured with in 2015, to create a record in which they each played a song written by the other on each side of a split 7" double-sided single, released by Bloodshot Records in November, 2016 and acquired by Rough Trade Records as a limited edition printing. Entitled Play Each Other's Songs, the A side features Whitmore covering Esmé Patterson's song "Elysium", and Patterson in turn covering Whitmore's "Not Feeling Any Pain" on the B side. The record garnered favorable reviews by critics and a video shot in downtown Los Angeles featuring Patterson dancing to her cover of Whitmore's song.

In April 2018, Whitmore signed with Bloodshot Records, with a new release expected in the fall of 2018.

The 2018 record is a covers record called Kilonova. Covers include songs by Bad Religion, Bill Withers, Captain Beefheart, Johnny Cash, The Magnetic Fields, and ZZ Top.

Whitmore has toured with Chris Cornell, City and Colour, Murder by Death, Clutch, Lucero, Converge, Red Sparowes, Modern Life is War, Frontier Ruckus, Frank Turner, Esmé Patterson and The Low Anthem.

His live act features Whitmore's distinctive deep baritone voice, and features Whitmore playing the banjo or guitar while singing, though on occasion he performs a cappella. He sometimes tours with a full band, but often plays roots-folk music as a solo act.

Two documentaries about Richard Proenneke, "From the Heartland to the Great Northwest" and "The Living Wilderness" are narrated by Whitmore. For years, William's grandmother, Edith Tweedy, was a pen pal of Richard's.

Whitmore has a long-term musical relationship with his cousin Luke Tweedy, head engineer and producer at Iowa City's Flat Black Studios.

=== Middle Western ===
In 2016, Whitmore and musician and producer David Zollo formed the folk band Middle Western. An upcoming record is planned. Other members of Middle Western include Stephen Howard (guitar, bass), Stevie Doyle (guitar, bass), and Brian Cooper (drums).

== Personal life ==
Whitmore is married and lives on the farm where he grew up. His daughter was born in March 2020.

Whitmore has stated that he is an atheist.

== Discography ==
=== Albums ===
- 1999: The Jarrett Mitchell Demo Album (self-released)
- 2001: Calendar Club of Danger and Fun (self-released)
- 2003: Hymns for the Hopeless (Southern Records)
- 2005: Ashes to Dust (Southern Records)
- 2006: Song of the Blackbird (Southern Records)
- 2009: Animals in the Dark (ANTI-)
- 2011: Field Songs (ANTI-)
- 2015: Radium Death (ANTI-)
- 2018: Kilonova (Bloodshot Records)
- 2020: I'm With You (Bloodshot Records)
- 2024: Silently, The Mind Breaks

Middle Western

- 2018: When Your Demons are Underground and You’ve Got to Dig Them Up (Long Play Records)

=== Singles/EPs ===
- 2004: The Day The End Finally Came........ 7" (Southern Records) – A: "The Day The End Finally Came / B1: "Does Me No Good," B2: "The Buzzard Won't Cry"
- 2005: Latitudes: WEW EP (Southern Records) – Latitudes session recordings series

=== Compilations ===
- 2013: Early Years (Long Play Records) – 3-LP set of re-recorded and re-mastered versions of Whitmore's first three albums

=== Collaborations ===
- 2002: After The Gold Rush (CCAC Wattis Institute) – music and book collaboration with artist Jeremy Deller
- 2004: Flaccid Trip / William E. Whitmore split (Scenester Credentials) – William Elliott Whitmore, "Somebody's Been Usin' That Thang" / FT (The Shadow Government), "Clique Track"
- 2006: Hallways of Always EP (Southern Records) – with Jenny Hoyston of Erase Errata
- 2010: Murder by Death & William Elliott Whitmore split (Tent Show Records) – Murder by Death, "One Man's Shame" / William Elliott Whitmore "Dynamite Mine"
- 2011: William Elliott Whitmore / P.O.S. with Big Cats 7" vinyl split (Init Records) – William Elliott Whitmore, "Country Blues" / POS with Big Cats "Crack A Window"
- 2015: No Eminent Domain 7" vinyl split (Long Play Records) – William Elliott Whitmore, "Civilizations" (Full Band Version)" / Hallways Of Always, "You Never Even Called Me by My Name"
- 2016: Play Each Other's Songs 7" split (Bloodshot Records) – William Elliott Whitmore, "Elysium" / Esmé Patterson, "Not Feeling Any Pain"

=== Contributions ===
- 2004: No Laws: Keep the Fuzz Off My Buzz 12" compilation (Modern Radio Records) – with Paradise Island, Let's Be Active, and FT (The Shadow Government); tracks: "I'm Building Me A Home" and "Farther Along"
- 2005: When the Cat Returns the Mice Are Fucked compilation (Southern Records) – Various artists; track: "Midnight"
- 2009: Hiram and Huddie – Vol. 1 & 2 (Hillgrass Bluebilly Records) – 2-CD tribute to Hank Williams and Lead Belly; tracks: "Mother Is Gone" and "The Gallis (Gallows) Pole"
- 2010: Red Dead Redemption video game soundtrack (Wax Poetics Records) – track: "Bury Me Not on the Lone Prairie"
- 2010: Germs of Perfection: A Tribute to Bad Religion (MySpace Records in conjunction with Spin Magazine) – track: "Don't Pray on Me"
- 2012: Iowa City Song Project (Maximum Ames Records) – track: "Run Johnny Run"
- 2014: While No One Was Looking: Toasting 20 Years of Bloodshot Records (Bloodshot Records) – track: “I Wish I Was the Moon” (Neko Case cover)
