= Bitter Drink, Bitter Moon =

Studio album by Murder by Death
- Released: September 25, 2012
- Genre: Americana; post-punk; alternative country; gothic country
- Length: 44:22
- Label: Bloodshot
- Producer: John Congleton, Murder by Death

Murder by Death chronology
Good Morning, Magpie (2010)	Bitter Drink, Bitter Moon (2012)	Big Dark Love (2015)

Professional ratings
Aggregate scores
Source	Rating
Metacritic	75%
Review scores
Source	Rating
The A.V. Club	B−
PopMatters	7/10 stars
Under The Gun Review	8/10

Bitter Drink, Bitter Moon is the sixth full-length album by indie rock band Murder by Death released on September 25, 2012.

== Track listing ==
No.	Title	Length
1.	"My Hill"	2:36
2.	"Lost River"	4:24
3.	"Straight at the Sun"	4:02
4.	"No Oath, No Spell"	3:30
5.	"I Came Around"	4:35
6.	"Hard World"	3:37
7.	"Ditch Lilly"	3:32
8.	"The Curse of Elkhart"	2:50
9.	"Ramblin’"	3:12
10.	"Queen Mab"	1:26
11.	"Go to the Light"	3:40
12.	"Oh to Be an Animal"	3:01
13.	"Ghost Fields"	4:01

== Personnel ==
Band

- Adam Turla – lead vocals, guitars, production, sound engineer, mixing
- Sarah Balliet – cello, production, sound engineer, mixing
- Dagan Thogerson – drums, percussion, production, sound engineer, mixing
- Matt Armstrong – bass, tape loops, production, sound engineer, mixing
- Scott Brackett – keyboards, accordion, cornet, theremin, mandolin, samples, backing vocals, production, sound engineer, mixing

Additional musicians and production

- Samantha Crain – vocals (tracks 2 and 6)
- Alan Douches – mastering
- Celeste Byers – artwork, design
- John Congleton – producer, sound engineer, mixing
- Juan Carrera – management
- Justin Bridgewater – booking
- Ross Morrison – booking
- Stephen Sessa – legal counsel
- Stuart Sikes – sound engineer
- Thor Harris – dulcimer
