= Ashes to Dust =

Studio album by William Elliott Whitmore
- Released: February 22, 2005
- Genre: Alternative country
- Label: Southern Records

William Elliott Whitmore chronology
| Hymns for the Hopeless (2003) | Ashes to Dust (2005) | Song of the Blackbird (2006) |

Professional ratings
Review scores
| Source | Rating |
|---|---|
| Allmusic | 4./5 stars |

Ashes to Dust is the second studio album by American musician/songwriter William Elliott Whitmore. It was released in 2005 on the Southern Records label.

== Track listing ==
All tracks by William Elliott Whitmore

1. "Midnight" – 3:34
2. "The Day the End Finally Came" – 4:18
3. "When Push Comes to Love" – 3:50
4. "Diggin' My Grave" – 4:06
5. "The Buzzards Won't Cry" – 2:22
6. "Sorest of Eyes" – 3:30
7. "Lift My Jug (Song for Hub Cale)" – 3:36
8. "Gravel Road" – 3:52
9. "Porchlight" – 5:47

== Personnel ==
- William Elliott Whitmore – vocals, guitar, banjo
- Zach Action – bass
- Jay Thomas Dandurand – drums

== See also ==
- 2005 in music
