= Sleep Station =

American indie rock band

- Origin: Bergen County, New Jersey, United States
- Genres: Indie rock, folk rock
- Years active: 2000–present
- Labels: Eyeball, Air & Sea Battle
- Members: David Debiak; Ryan Ball; Brad Paxton

Sleep Station is an American indie rock band on Eyeball Records from Bergen County, New Jersey, that revolves around frontman David Debiak. While some Sleep Station albums have been recorded with a full band (After the War, The Pride of Chester James), others have essentially been David Debiak solo albums (Von Cosel, The Blood of Our Our Fathers), featuring very little, if any, instrumentation other than David Debiak's own guitar playing. Sleep Station is known for its concept albums; to date, all Sleep Station releases have been concept albums, and have been called "rock operas" by some critics. David Debiak himself, however, has stated that he is not trying to tell a story in his songs, stating in a MySpace bulletin "Every record I have done as Sleep Station has been thematic in its nature, not trying to tell a story but just create a mood." Unconventional love affairs and war are common lyrical themes in Sleep Station's music.

== History ==
Sleep Station began in 2001, with David Debiak having the intention of producing a movie. Unable to obtain funds to do so, he opted to write a soundtrack to the nonexistent movie instead. The result was the concept album Anhedonia, released on Spot The Genius Productions in 2001, which chronicles the life, death and subsequent trip to hell, of a serial killer and rapist.

Following Anhedonia, Sleep Station signed to New Jersey–based Eyeball Records. In 2002, Sleep Station released its first album on Eyeball Records, Runaway Elba-1. The album tells the story of a cybernetics engineer who builds a female robot, Elba-1. Elba-1 and the engineer fall wildly in love, but must flee when the engineer's employers are determined to steal Elba-1.

The following year, Sleep Station released the Von Cosel EP as a free download on the band's website. Although previous Sleep Station albums had featured several David Debiak acoustic solo songs, Von Cosel was the first release to slightly abandon the "band" format. There were, however, substantial contributions by Brad Paxton (Guitar), and Ryan Ball (Guitar, Bass, Lap Steel, Drums, Piano, Organ, Recording, Mixing, and Mastering engineer).

For their next album, Hang in There Charlie, Sleep Station once again adopted a "band" format. Hang in There Charlie tells the story of two astronauts who arrive at a space station to discover it has been hugely neglected. When the astronauts protest, they are punished by NASA by being abandoned and left in the space station to die.

In 2004, Sleep Station released its arguably most successful album to date, After The War. Recorded using mostly instruments and equipment from the 1940s, After The War tells the story of a soldier fighting in World War II, while occasionally interspersing stories from other characters. The album features interludes of 1940s audio recordings of soldiers reciting poetry for their wives and girlfriends.

Following After the War, Sleep Station went on hiatus, with David Debiak starting a side project, New London Fire, with his brother Jason.

In 2008, Sleep Station returned from hiatus with the album The Pride of Chester James, an album about a fictional circus drifter who shows up in a small town.

Later in the year, Sleep Station released The Blood of Our Fathers as a free download on the Air and Sea Battle website, an album whose lyrics loosely revolve around two brothers fighting in an unnamed war.

== Discography ==
=== Albums ===
- Anhedonia (2000)
- Runaway Elba-1 (2002) (re-released in 2003)
- Hang in There Charlie (2003)
- After The War (2004)
- The Pride of Chester James (2008)
- The Blood of Our Fathers (2008)
- The Earth Is in Us (2024)

=== EPs ===
- Von Cosel (2003)
- Songs trom the Highway Volume 1 EP (2010)
- American Rust / Dream of Mary (2020)
- Leads Back Home (2020)

== Cinematography ==
- Sleep Station's song "Goodnight to the Moon" from the discography After the War has been used in SKINS (TV series), season 1, episode 7.
- Their song "Land and Come for Us" has been used in SKINS (TV series), season 2, episode 10
