= The Tiny =

Swedish band

The Tiny is a Swedish band consisting of pianist and vocalist Ellekari Larsson, cellist Leo Svensson, and double bassist Johan Berthling (sometimes replaced by Patric Thorman or Torbjörn Zetterberg in live shows). Larsson's DetErMine Records distributes the band's albums in Sweden, while they are signed to Eyeball Records in the United States. The Tiny's first album, Close Enough, was released in Spring 2004 in Sweden, and a year later in the United States. Their second album, Starring: Someone Like You, was released in March 2006.

The group's hauntingly minimalistic music demonstrates classical, gothic, and other influences. Larsson's characteristically childlike singing voice is frequently prone to melodic yowling and warbling, and has drawn comparisons to Björk, Kate Bush and Joanna Newsom. The band gained popularity in 2012 after their song "Closer" was featured in an episode of the podcast Welcome to Night Vale. In 2020, the band made a return with a new single, "Dog Eat Dog".

== Discography ==
- Close Enough (2004)
- Starring: Someone Like You (2006)
- "Gravity & Grace" (2009)
