= Big Dark Love =

Studio album by Murder By Death
- Released: February 3, 2015
- Genre: Country
- Length: 32:47
- Label: Bloodshot Records
- Producer: Big Dark Love & Kevin Ratterman

Murder By Death chronology
Bitter Drink, Bitter Moon (2012)	Big Dark Love (2015)

Big Dark Love is the seventh studio album by the American indie rock band Murder by Death. The album is a follow-up to their sixth studio album Bitter Drink, Bitter Moon, released in 2012. Produced by Kevin Ratterman under the label Bloodshot Records, the album was released on 3 February 2015.

== Critical reception ==
Professional ratings
Aggregate scores
Source	Rating
Metacritic	75%
Review scores
Source	Rating
Elmore	84/100
Exclaim!	9/10
Pitchfork Media	5.8/10

Writing for Exclaim!, Blake Morneau hailed the record as "a walloping triumph of great roots songwriting," further noting it has "big, dark secrets hidden away in its seams that call out for repeated listens until you can draw them into the light." Leah Dearborn of Elmore Magazine commented that the band "has been experimenting with their established sound, implementing a range of percussion, horn and even a touch of electronica" but that fans "can look forward to the same distinctive, mournful tones that Murder By Death has cultivated over the past 15 years."

== Track listing ==
No.	Title	Length
1.	"I Shot an Arrow"	3:59
2.	"Strange Eyes"	3:14
3.	"Big Dark Love"	4:11
4.	"Dream in Red"	2:33
5.	"Solitary One"	2:48
6.	"Send Me Home"	3:32
7.	"Last Thing"	2:55
8.	"Natural Pearl"	2:12
9.	"It Will Never Die"	3:33
10.	"Hunted"	3:49
