= Wild Gods =

Studio album by the Number Twelve Looks Like You
- Released: September 20, 2019
- Recorded: 2018–2019
- Genres: Mathcore, screamo, metalcore, progressive metal
- Length: 39:28
- Label: Overlord
- Producer: The Number Twelve Looks Like You

The Number Twelve Looks Like You chronology
Worse Than Alone (2009)	Wild Gods (2019)

Professional ratings
Review scores
Source	Rating
Exclaim!	8/10

Wild Gods is the fifth studio album by the Number Twelve Looks Like You and their first album in a decade due to their split from 2010 to 2016. It was released on September 20, 2019 through Overlord Music, with its first single "Ruin the Smile" released on July 16, 2019.

It is also the only album to feature DJ Scully on bass and Michael Kadnar on drums after they both stepped down from the band in 2024.

== Track listing ==
No.	Title	Length
1.	"Gallery of Thrills"	4:18
2.	"Last Laughter"	3:14
3.	"Ruin the Smile"	4:51
4.	"Ease My Siamese"	4:43
5.	"Sword Swallower"	1:27
6.	"Raised and Erased"	4:33
7.	"Tombo's Wound"	4:21
8.	"Of Fear"	5:29
9.	"Interspecies"	2:03
10.	"Rise Up Mountain"	4:29

== Personnel ==
The Number Twelve Looks Like You

- Jesse Korman – vocals
- Alexis Pareja – guitar
- DJ Scully – bass
- Michael Kadnar – drums

== Production ==
- Recorded By – Kevin Antreassian
- Producer [Vocals (Additional Producing)] – Jeremy Comitas
- Producer [Vocals] – Mikhail Marinas
- Photography By, Set Designer – Karen Jerzyk
