= E for Explosion =

American alternative rock and shoegaze band

- Origin: Guthrie, Kentucky, United States
- Genres: Shoegazing, Alternative rock
- Years active: 2005-2013, 2020–present
- Labels: Roamer Records, Eyeball Records
- Members: Jamison Covington; Dai Britain Covington
- Past members: Christian Hayden (2007-2009); Dave Charles (2008-2009; Josh Elmore (2007-2010); Travis Cutright (2009); Christopher Michael Sturm (2009)

E for Explosion is an American alternative rock/shoegazing band formed by former JamisonParker singer Jamison Covington after the group's breakup in 2005. The only two constant members of the band were Covington (vocals, guitar) and his wife, Dai Britain Covington (keyboards). After undergoing a hiatus in 2013, the band self-released two EPs in 2020. Beginning in 2012, Jamison took on the role of composer contributing instrumental and artist tracks to various television shows across networks such as MTV, E!, Bravo, VH1, CMT and more.

== History ==
=== Formation and debut release (2005–2008) ===
The band formed upon the breakup of JamisonParker and was originally called Dance With The Dead, this was strictly a solo project of Covington. Covington would later change the name of the project to "Covington," and release a number of demos under that moniker. He then recruited touring musicians and began playing under the name "E For Explosion", a name chosen because of Covington's admiration of science fiction writer Ray Bradbury. After the band released an EP, they were signed to Eyeball Records and released their debut album Reinventing the Heartbeat on May 20, 2008. The album was produced by Dave Trumfio.

=== Post-debut album and independent releases (2009–2013) ===
The group released a new demo titled "Blankets and Blonde Hair" on February 23, 2009. A second demo was released on March 9, 2009, titled "This is Goodbye." Both were removed from the group's Myspace player.

On September 29, 2009, Covington announced through Myspace that E For Explosion would be releasing a 5-song acoustic EP "soon", consisting of "all new unheard, unperformed and unreleased songs". The EP would be titled Why Do I Keep Hitting Myself With a Hammer? 'Cause It Feels So Good When I Stop... It was later announced that the EP would be released sometime in March 2010. The track listing included:

1. I'm Disappearing
2. This Is Me Being Honest
3. Yeah Yeah, So I Dreamt of You Again
4. Maybe
5. Sometimes Sleep Ain't Enough

Why Do I Keep Hitting Myself With a Hammer? 'Cause It Feels So Good When I Stop... was later abandoned by the band without explanation and all Myspace posts regarding it were removed. In spite of this, the EP was later released digitally on Amazon MP3 and iTunes in late 2011.

On December 2, 2009, the group released a Christmas song titled "A Long Lonely Christmas." Covington stated in a Myspace blog that the track "won't be on the upcoming EP", and that more info regarding the EP would be shared very soon. On February 16, 2010, the band posted another demo called "Cool Kids", noting it would be re-recorded for their next full-length album.

On October 29, 2010, it was announced via E for Explosion's MySpace page that a four-song EP entitled Hold Grudges Not Hands, recorded by Dave Trumfio, was scheduled to be released digitally on November 23, 2010. The EP included the following tracks:

1. Cool Kids
2. PS I'm Dead
3. Blankets and Blonde Hair
4. This is Goodbye

After some "technical difficulties", as announced via Covington's Twitter account, the EP was finally made available for purchase via iTunes on November 25, 2010. The band blogged on their Myspace announcing its release, as well as thanking the fans for being patient.

On July 5, 2011, E For Explosion released a new song titled "Answers" on their Myspace and Facebook pages. The song was a b-side taken from their upcoming EP, Love, which was released on August 2, 2011. According to E For Explosion's Facebook post, the EP was the first of three EPs, named respectively Love, Out, Loud, to be released by the end of the year.

E for Explosion later released a "re-envisioning" of several songs from their debut full-length album titled Echoes of Reinvention. The EP was released on February 14, 2012. Following this release, Covington pursued composition, performance, and production work for assorted TV networks, including E!, MTV, ABC Family, and VH1. Later, in October 2012, E For Explosion self-released their second album, The View from Cypress Lane.

The two final EPs in the Love, Out, Loud trilogy were released in 2013. E For Explosion then entered into a hiatus near the end of the year.

=== Hiatus and Covington's other projects (2013–2020) ===
Covington released his debut solo EP (using his own name), Serenading Ghosts Vol. 1 - Lost in October 2014. Volume 2, I Am A Black Cat, was announced in December 2014.

Following his departure from Finch, Randy Strohmeyer joined Covington to form a new project named Haunted Houses. The pair released their first single, "Looking Backwards," via their Bandcamp page on June 7, 2016. No additional updates regarding the project's status have been made.

=== Return (2020–present) ===
Covington resumed use of the E For Explosion moniker and self-released two EPs in 2020, including Remember Blue Skies and Sundowner. Covington also released two singles, "Who am I" and "mountain climber" that same year via Bandcamp.

As of July 2020, no additional updates have been made regarding E For Explosion's status.

On November 8, 2025, and following a special request, Covington announced that he would be accepting individual orders/requests for unique, personalized acoustic recordings of his previously released songs (from both the E for Explosion and JamisonParker monikers). The price per recording, with handwritten lyrics, will be US$100.

== Discography ==
=== Albums ===
- Reinventing the Heartbeat (Eyeball Records, May 20, 2008)
- The View from Cypress Lane (self-released, October 16, 2012)

=== EPs ===
- Paper Flowers (self-released, October 2007)
- Hold Grudges Not Hands (self-released, November 2010)
- Love (self-released August 2011, re-issued March 2013)
- Why Do I Keep Hitting Myself With a Hammer? 'Cause It Feels So Good When I Stop... (self-released, September 2011)
- Echoes of Reinvention (self-released, February 2012)
- Out (self-released, May 2013)
- Loud (self-released, 2013)
- Remember Blue Skies (self-released, March 2020)
- Sundowner (self-released, June 2020)

=== Singles ===
- "I Explode" (2008)
- "Deaf, Blind And True" (2011)
- "Answers" (2011)
- "Who am I" (2020)
- "mountain climber" (2020)
