= United Nations (band) =

Hardcore punk supergroup

- Origin: New York City
- Genres: Hardcore punk; post-hardcore; grindcore; screamo
- Years active: 2005–present
- Labels: Eyeball; Deathwish; Temporary Residence
- Website: unitedfuckingnations.com

United Nations is a hardcore punk supergroup whose roots go back to at least 2005. Due to the nature of the band, it is unclear who exactly is a member of United Nations at any given time. Early promotional images of the band depicted four people wearing Ronald Reagan masks, and all original contributors were contractually obligated to remain anonymous. The only member not under contract at the time was Geoff Rickly of the band Thursday.

== History ==
=== Formation and early recording sessions (2005–2008) ===
Note: (Note: Rickly has revealed that in the early days of the band, they had "a deliberate disinformation campaign" where they gave different and contradictory information in interviews. This means a lot of early information of the band may be unreliable.)

The idea of the side project can be traced back to the early 2000s, but it was not until 2008 that United Nations took shape. Geoff Rickly has said the band started over tequila with Daryl Palumbo. At the start of the band, all members except for Rickly were under contracts with other record labels and were not legally permitted to work in projects released by another, making it difficult for the official lineup of the band to be well known. However some members from the band's original line-up have been revealed through interviews and social media posts, such as Daryl Palumbo, Jonah Bayer and Lukas Previn. Since Rickly was the only member whose primary band was not under contract, his name is the only one that could legally appear in press materials. Press photos of the band released in 2008 depict four people wearing Ronald Reagan masks.

In 2008, the band claimed to have recorded enough material for two studio albums, two extended plays that would be released at some point. The band was uncertain if these would be the only releases by the band, or if the band will regroup to record more songs.

=== Debut album and EP (2008–2010) ===
United Nations released their self-titled debut on September 9, 2008, through Eyeball Records. The band was ready to release the album with essentially the same photo cover for the iconic cover of The Beatles' Abbey Road, with the exception of The Beatles engulfed in flames and walking to the left rather than the right. When stores began refusing to sell the album, pressing was halted with 1,000 albums already made. These were sold exclusively through the Eyeball Records webstore, and it was later released with a different cover. The album received minor success and while it didn't chart on the Billboard 200, it did chart at number 44 on the Billboard Independent Albums and number 14 on the Billboard Top Heatseekers.

Poster for United Nations' first show. Darkest Hour was added after poster was made.

The band did not tour in support of the album, however they did play a handful of shows spread out over 2009 ending in 2010. United Nations played their first show on January 20, 2009, the day of Barack Obama's presidential inauguration. They played alongside Anti-Flag, Darkest Hour, Ruiner, and The A.K.A.s in Washington DC. The band's second show was on April 17, 2009, at the Groezrock festival in Belgium. The band's third show was on May 23, 2009. Other known tour dates include December 30, 2009, January 15, 2010 and February 12, 2010.

On June 23, 2010, United Nations released, Never Mind the Bombings, Here's Your Six Figures, The four-song EP was released on June 23, 2010, through Deathwish Inc on 7" vinyl and as a digital download. The EP was expected to face similar copyright issues to the band's debut due to the title and cover being a parody of the Sex Pistols' album Never Mind the Bollocks, Here's the Sex Pistols.

=== The Next Four Years (2013–2015) ===
Nearly four years after their first show, United Nations performed live on January 18, 2013, in Saint Vitus Bar in Brooklyn, NY with Primitive Weapons, Descender and Black Clouds. In October and November 2013, United Nations toured the eastern US with Pianos Become the Teeth and Circle Takes the Square. The lineup for this tour featured Rickly, Bayer, Previn, and David Haik and Zac Sewell both of Pianos Become the Teeth.

United Nations released their second studio album, The Next Four Years, on July 14, 2014, through Temporary Residence Limited. The release of the album was preceded by a stream of "Serious Business". Following the release, the band toured the US in August 2014. Before United Nations's Brooklyn set in August 2014, Bayer's sister and Saturday Night Live cast member Vanessa Bayer came on stage and roasted the band.

=== "Stairway to Mar-a-Lago" (2017) ===
United Nations self-released the single "Stairway to Mar-a-Lago" on January 20, 2017, through Bandcamp on a name-your-price basis, to coincide with (and protest) the inauguration of US President Donald Trump. The proceeds went to Planned Parenthood and ACLU. The single notably features a new anonymous vocalist. (Note: Many internet publicists have rumored that former and founding member Daryl Palumbo could be the new vocalist.)

== Influences and genre ==
United Nations have been described as hardcore punk, post-hardcore, grindcore and experimental hardcore. The band has stated to have influences from genres such as mid-1990s screamo, hardcore, powerviolence, and post-hardcore and bands such as Refused, Nation of Ulysses, Orchid, Majority Rule, Fugazi, Reversal of Man and bands signed to Gravity Records and Ebullition Records. United Nations pays tribute to the bands from which they take their influence in their albums. On their self-titled debut album, the song titled "The Shape of Punk that Never Came" pays tribute to Refused's album The Shape of Punk to Come – most notably in the lyric "Dennis, are you listening? Is there something that I'm missing?" which is directed toward Dennis Lyxzén, the lead singer of Refused.

United Nations was inspired by bands that "raised questions about political corruption, social inequity, personal responsibility and artistic freedom" in opposition to bands that are more concerned with pop culture. Geoff Rickly commented on his vision for the band:

To me, it was like, maybe speaking sincerely about things isn't enough to make people pay attention. Maybe you have to make fun of people — and be a mirror — to show them how stupid they look, to get their attention. That's the idea. Punk is just way too safe these days, so we're hoping by making some audacious claims and doing some strange things and breaking a few laws, we can get people to think at least. It's the idea that you need to embrace the absurdity or it will fucking kill you. The world doesn't make sense, and trying to make sense of it is a fool's errand.

— Geoff Rickly,

== "Disinformation campaign" ==
Rickly has said “...in the beginning we had a deliberate disinformation campaign. I mean we tried to give different and contradictory information in almost every interview we did".

=== List of false information ===
- Rickly has said the band planned to release a Kidz Bop style album, titled United Nations Plays Pretty for a Bunch of Fucking Babies. The album's title was a parody of Nation of Ulysses' album Plays Pretty for Baby. In a 2014 interview Rickly confirmed this as fake. It is unclear if other announced albums such as The Dark Side of the UN are also fake.
- The band has claimed comedian Kristen Schaal wrote lyrics for the band. In a 2014 interview Rickly said “I had people asking what Kristen Schaal was like, and stuff like that. In the end seeing what kinds of things people believed so easily got kind of frustrating and sad.”

== Controversies ==
=== Debut cover art ===
Before its release, stores refused to sell the band's debut self-titled album because of trademark issues with the album cover, which is the photo of The Beatles used for the cover of their album Abbey Road with airbrushed "flames" on the band members. As a result, only 1,000 copies were made with the controversial cover, and later copies were made with an alternative cover. The one thousand original copies were sold exclusively through the band and Eyeball Records.

=== Band name ===
The international organization, United Nations, after which the band is named, discovered that a musical group had formed under the name of United Nations, and ordered Facebook to remove their official page. After deleting their page, Facebook informed the band about the removal and also stated, "The use of the name 'United Nations' by the Band and the use of its Logo which resembles the UN emblem has not been authorized and violates international and United States laws..." The band's record label comically responded to the situation stating, "The United Nations, an international organization of some kind, has been taking issue with the band that shares its name. Who had the name first remains open to debate, but the problem exists nonetheless." Their label also hinted at the possibility of no longer being able to release their debut album. In December 2008, a little over a month after the band's Facebook was deleted, their MySpace page was also deleted.

== Members ==
Due to the nature of the band, it is unclear who exactly is a member of United Nations at any given time. Early promotional images of the band depicted four people wearing Ronald Reagan masks, and all contributors were contractually obligated to remain anonymous. The only member not under contract was Geoff Rickly of the band Thursday, for press and media purposes. However, Jonah Bayer and Lukas Previn later became publicly announced members of United Nations as well. Many sources claim that Daryl Palumbo, Ben Koller, Alex Saavedra and also members of various bands signed to Eyeball Records contributed to United Nations. The cease-and-desist letter sent to the band and Eyeball Records, by the actual United Nations, to Facebook to remove the band's profile listed approximately 30 people who the government entity suspected as being band members at the time.

In a 2013 interview with Rickly, he elaborated on the revolving line-up of United Nations, stating: "The reason that we've been able to kind of get away with playing when we want to is because we change members and because we've never copyrighted any of the songs to any member. So, it's really hard to say who made what and who was just playing [in United Nations] for a little while. That's something that has protected us — the anonymity of the band, the changing nature of the band — it's like, 'Well i was only in it for a little while, and then it was these guys, and then it was these guys, and then it was these guys...'" In the same interview, managing editor of Alternative Press Scott Heisel asked Rickly if, because he is the only well-known member of United Nations, he was afraid of taking the full blame for any of the band's controversial or potentially illegal activity. He responded: "I don't feel like many bands take chances anymore. There's a lot of talk about being punk and revolutionary and this and that, but it's also awfully safe — punk seems awfully safe to me now, so I like the idea of doing something that's actually dangerous."

=== List of members and verifiable contributions ===
Name	Years active	Contributions in studio	Contributions live	Notes
Geoff Rickly	2005–present	Provided vocals on United Nations; Provided vocals on Never Mind the Bombings, Here's Your Six Figures; Provided vocals on The Next Four Years	Provided vocals for all shows	Founding member of the band
Daryl Palumbo	2005–2008	Performed on United Nations		Founding member of the band
Jonah Bayer	2005–present	Performed on United Nations; Performed on Never Mind the Bombings, Here's Your Six Figures; Performed on The Next Four Years	Provided lead guitar on: January 20, 2009; May 23, 2009; January 15, 2010; February 12, 2010; The Next Four Years tours (2014–2015)	Founding member of the band
Lukas Previn	2005–present	Performed on The Next Four Years	Provided bass on: May 23, 2009; Provided guitar on: December 30, 2009; January 15, 2010; February 12, 2010; The Next Four Years tours (2014–2015)	Founding member of the band; Toured and recorded with the band before 2010
Ben Koller	?–2010	Provided drums on United Nations; Provided drums on Never Mind the Bombings, Here's Your Six Figures	Provided drums on: May 23, 2009; December 30, 2009; January 15, 2010; February 12, 2010	
Ryan Bland	2009–2010		Provided harsh vocals on: January 20, 2009; May 23, 2009; January 15, 2010	
Jim Carroll	2010		Provided bass on: January 15, 2010; February 12, 2010	
Zac Sewell	2013–present	Performed on The Next Four Years	Performed a few shows with the band starting in 2013; The Next Four Years tours (2014–2015)	
David Haik	2013–present	Performed on The Next Four Years	Provided drums on: a few shows with the band starting in 2013; The Next Four Years tours (2014–2015)	

== Discography ==
=== Studio albums ===
List of studio albums, with selected chart positions
Title	Album details	Peak chart positions	
Title	Album details	US	US Indie
United Nations	Released: September 9, 2008; Label: Eyeball; Formats: CD, LP	— (Note: United Nations did not enter the Billboard 200 Albums Chart, but peaked at number 14 on the Billboard Heatseeker Albums Chart.)	44
The Next Four Years	Released: July 15, 2014; Label: Temporary Residence; Formats: CD, LP, Boxset	—	—

=== EPs ===
List of extended plays
Title	EP details
Never Mind the Bombings, Here's Your Six Figures	Released: June 23, 2010; Label: Deathwish; Formats: 7-inch
Illegal UN	Released: 2013; Label: Self-released; Formats: Cassette

=== Singles ===
- "Stairway to Mar-a-Lago" (2017, Temporary Residence)
