= Put on Your Rosy Red Glasses =

2003 studio album by the Number Twelve Looks Like You

Studio album by The Number Twelve Looks Like You
- Released: March 7, 2003
- Genres: Mathcore, grindcore, metalcore
- Length: 35:04
- Label: Brutal
- Producer: Kurt Ballou

The Number Twelve Looks Like You chronology
Put on Your Rosy Red Glasses (2003)	Nuclear. Sad. Nuclear. (2005)

Professional ratings
Review scores
Source	Rating
AbsolutePunk.net	95% link
Allmusic	link
emotionalpunk	link
PunkNews.org	link

Put on Your Rosy Red Glasses is the debut studio album by American mathcore group the Number Twelve Looks Like You. It has been reissued twice since its original release by Brutal Records, and once by Silent Pendulum Records as a 20th anniversary celebration. It has been regarded as the band’s heaviest release.

On June 12, 2015 the album was re-released on limited edition, hand numbered cassettes.

== Writing concept ==
The lyrics of Put on Your Rosy Red Glasses are almost completely written in-perspective of well-known convicted murderer Albert Fish, although songs such as "If These Bullets Could Talk" and "Empty Calm" have no connection to the story of Fish.

The track "Document: Grace Budd" is a spoken excerpt of a letter written by Fish, detailing his murder of Grace Budd in 1934.

== Other information ==
The track "Civeta Dei" translates in English to "City of God".

The music on this release is much heavier than the band's later releases. The vocals on this album were done by using the fry scream technique among both Korman and Pedrick. There were neither edits nor enhancements on either of their voices.

Following the end of the final track "Civeta Dei", the album ends with 12 minutes of silence broken up into four hidden tracks that spell out the word "Die", with a small composition at the very end.

== Track listing ==
All of the songs written and produced by The Number Twelve Looks Like You.

No.	Title	Length
1.	"Don't Get Blood on My Prada Shoes"	1:36
2.	"Jesus and Tori"	3:18
3.	"Document: Grace Budd"	0:59
4.	"Blue Dress"	2:28
5.	"If These Bullets Could Talk"	4:05
6.	"Bambi the Hooker and a Case of Beer"	0:54
7.	"Empty Calm"	2:46
8.	"Civeta Dei" (includes hidden tracks (Note: "Civeta Dei" ends at 6:08, followed by 12 minutes of silence which is split into four hidden tracks that spell out the word "Die", with a small composition at the very end.))	18:56

== Personnel ==
The Number Twelve Looks Like You

- Jesse Korman - vocals
- Justin Pedrick - vocals
- Alexis Pareja - guitar
- Jamie Mcilroy - guitar
- Michael Smagula - bass guitar
- Christopher Conger - drums

Production and design

- Kurt Ballou - engineering, mastering, mixing, production
- The Number Twelve Looks Like You - production
