= Never Mind the Bombings, Here's Your Six Figures =

EP by United Nations
- Released: June 23, 2010
- Recorded: 2008
- Genre: Screamo
- Length: 11:39
- Label: Deathwish (DWI80)

United Nations chronology
United Nations (2008)	Never Mind the Bombings, Here's Your Six Figures (2010)	The Next Four Years (2014)

Professional ratings
Review scores
Source	Rating
Alternative Press	3.5/5 stars
Hearwax	(7.8/10)
Punknews.org	4/5 stars
Sputnikmusic	(4/5)

Never Mind the Bombings, Here's Your Six Figures is the second release from American screamo band United Nations. The four-song EP was released on June 23, 2010, through Deathwish Inc. on both 7" vinyl and digital download versions. The song "Pity Animal" was previously released in April 2010 on MMX, a free downloadable Deathwish sampler album.

Prior to the release of United Nations' self-titled debut album in 2008, Never Mind the Bombings, Here's Your Six Figures was announced to be the group's second album and follow up to United Nations. The EP was expected to face copyright issues for sharing a similar name and cover art to Sex Pistols' 1977 studio album Never Mind the Bollocks, Here's the Sex Pistols. The artwork for the EP was created by the Australian artist Ben Frost, and designed by Converge vocalist Jacob Bannon.

== Track listing ==
1. "Pity Animal" – 3:33
2. "O You Bright & Risen Angels" – 2:17
3. "Communication Letdown" – 2:18
4. "Never Mind the Bombings, Here's Your Six Figures" – 3:31

== Personnel ==
Continuing with United Nations' ambiguity of contributors, the liner notes for Never Mind the Bombings, Here's Your Six Figures provide neither writing nor production credits.
