= The Number Twelve Looks Like You =

American mathcore band

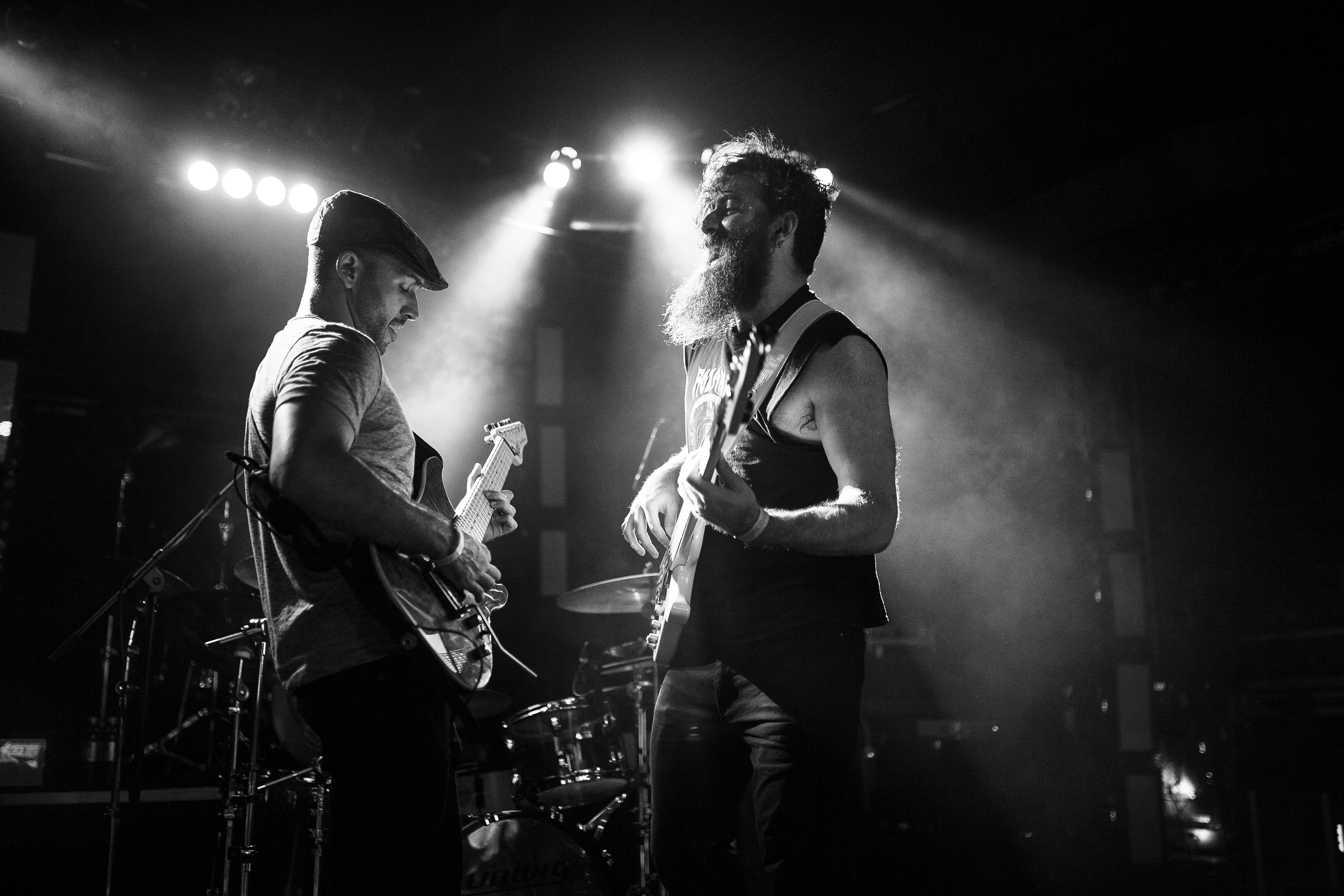
- The Number Twelve performing in Germany on a 2017 tour in support of the Dillinger Escape Plan

Background information
- Origin: Bergen County, New Jersey, U.S.
- Genres: Mathcore; metalcore; emo; screamo; post-hardcore
- Years active: 2001–2010, 2016–present
- Labels: ECA, Eyeball, Equal Vision
- Members: Jesse Korman; Alexis Pareja; Cody McCorry; Michael DeMarco
- Past members: Chris Russell; Jon Karel; Christopher Conger; Mike Smagula; Jamie McIlroy; Justin Pedrick; DJ Scully; Michael Kadnar

The Number Twelve Looks Like You is an American mathcore band formed in Bergen County, New Jersey in 2001. The band went on a six-year hiatus in 2010. In May 2016, they performed a secret show and then announced their reunion.

== History ==
=== Formation and Brutal Records years (2001–2004) ===
In early 2001, Jesse Korman, Chree Conger and Justin Pedrick met through mutual acquaintances and recruited Jamie McIlroy and Alexis Pareja which formed the bass-free outfit And Ever. The band was reportedly formed by "accident" where Pedrick was originally the only vocalist and Korman played drums. Korman then apparently realized he was a "terrible drummer", and as a result, took up being a second vocalist for the band wherein Conger then played drums in his place. After releasing a five-song demo and playing a handful of songs together, the band's style began to change slightly. They then soon changed their name to The Number Twelve Looks Like You, a name taken from the Twilight Zone episode "Number 12 Looks Just Like You".

In early 2003, with newly added bassist Mike Smagula, the band was heard at a live show by an A&R representative from Brutal Records, who was impressed, and informed the heads of the record label about the band. After hearing all the songs the band had currently recorded, the label signed the band in March and commissioned them to record two new songs, which along with the songs they had already recorded, were soon released on the band's first full-length album, Put On Your Rosy Red Glasses

=== Eyeball Records: An Inch of Gold for an Inch of Time and Nuclear. Sad. Nuclear. (2004–2006) ===
After extensive touring in promotion of Put On Your Rosy Red Glasses, the band began to catch the attention of Eyeball Records, and eventually they were signed in October 2004. Soon thereafter the band returned to the studio and began work on recording their first release for Eyeball, An Inch Of Gold For An Inch Of Time. The EP, released on January 25, 2005, featured a cover of The Knack's hit, "My Sharona", two new songs, and a re-recording of "Don't Get Blood On My Prada Shoes" and "Jesus And Tori", from their first full-length.

After a short promotional tour for An Inch of Gold for an Inch of Time, the band returned to the studio in March, and with producer D. James Goodwin, recorded their follow-up full length Nuclear. Sad. Nuclear.. Finished in seven days and later released on June 7, the album contained, amongst 10 new tracks, re-recordings of two tracks featured on An Inch Of Gold For An Inch Of Time, "Like A Cat" and "Clarissa Explains Cuntainment".

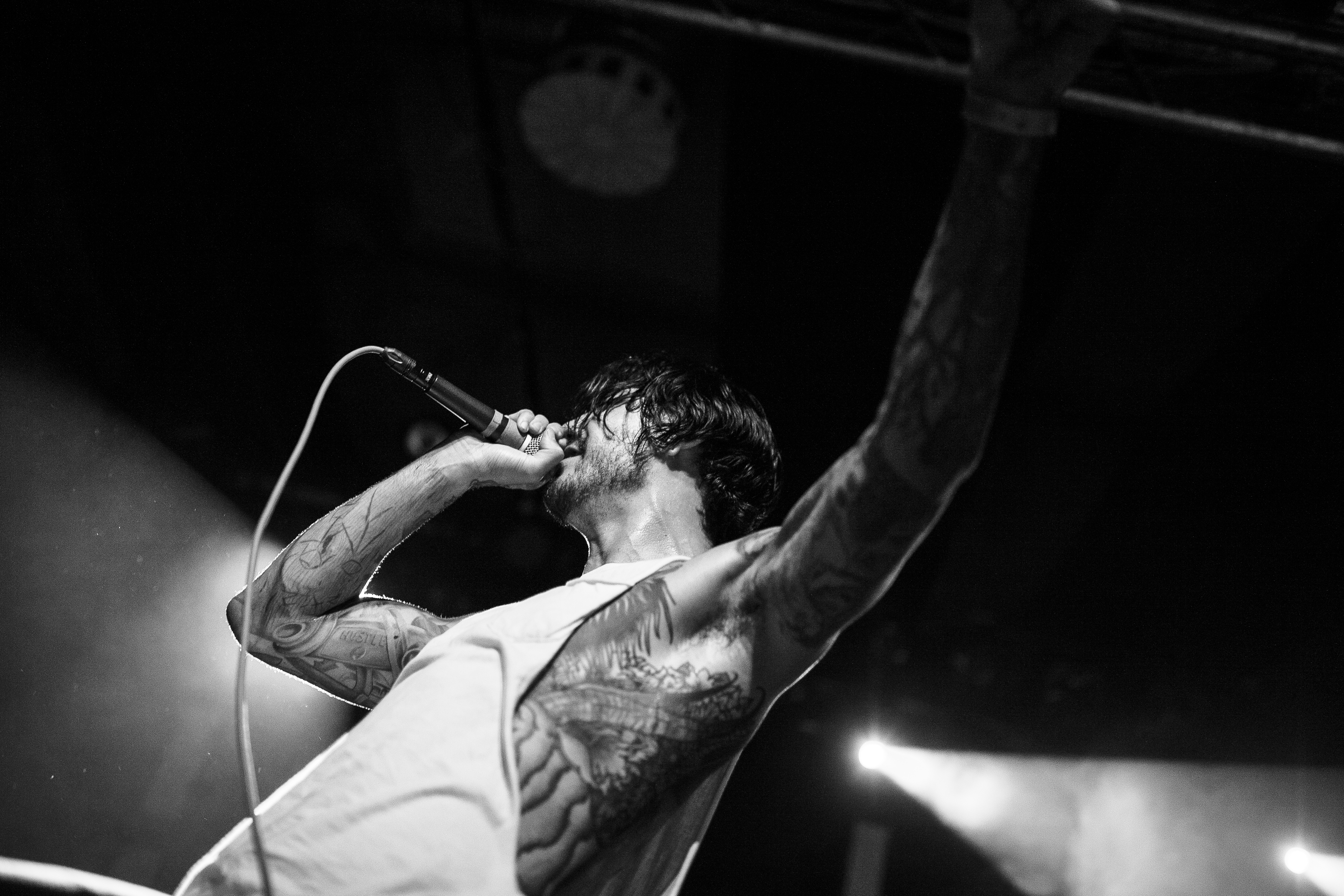

=== Mongrel, Worse Than Alone and break-up (2007–2010) ===
On June 19, 2007, the band released another full-length album, Mongrel, which featured all new material. The album peaked at No. 19 Billboard Heatseekers and No. 34 on the Top Independent Albums chart. Mongrel spawned only one single which was Grandfather. In 2008, the band released two CDs. One was a live CD/DVD entitled, Here at the End of All Things and the second release was a limited edition "alien green" 7" titled, The Remixes.

The Number Twelve Looks Like You released their follow-up to Mongrel, entitled Worse Than Alone, on March 10, 2009. Worse Than Alone leaked in its entirety to various Internet websites and communities on March 6, 2009. Worse Than Alone also reached the Billboard Heatseekers charts, peaking at No. 47.

During the band's tour with Protest the Hero, Misery Signals and Scale the Summit, the band announced that Justin Pedrick had left the band. On a blog on the band's MySpace page, they talked about Pedrick's departure from the band.

"We’ve seen a number of posts and comments wondering about Justin, and we are sad to announce that Justin is no longer with the band. It is unfortunate that he will not be part of what’s to come. The No. 12 has always maintained a positive outlook, one that feeds off the support of our fans. We will continue playing and writing music for the wonderful fan base we have".

In early 2010, the band confirmed rumors that they had broken up. The reason the band split was due to internal issues with each member. The group played their final show on January 29, 2010.

The band claimed, on their Twitter page, that if they reached 10,000 followers they "...will play a show or two", they had also asked fans on their Facebook page the question "so what cities love the 12 the most?" along with a rumour stating that they were expected to reform on December 12, 2012 (12/12/12) to coincide with their band name.

On August 2, 2013, The Number Twelve Looks Like You released the first episode of their upcoming video series, called 24/7.12, onto YouTube. In the first episode of the video series, the band spoke of their formation.

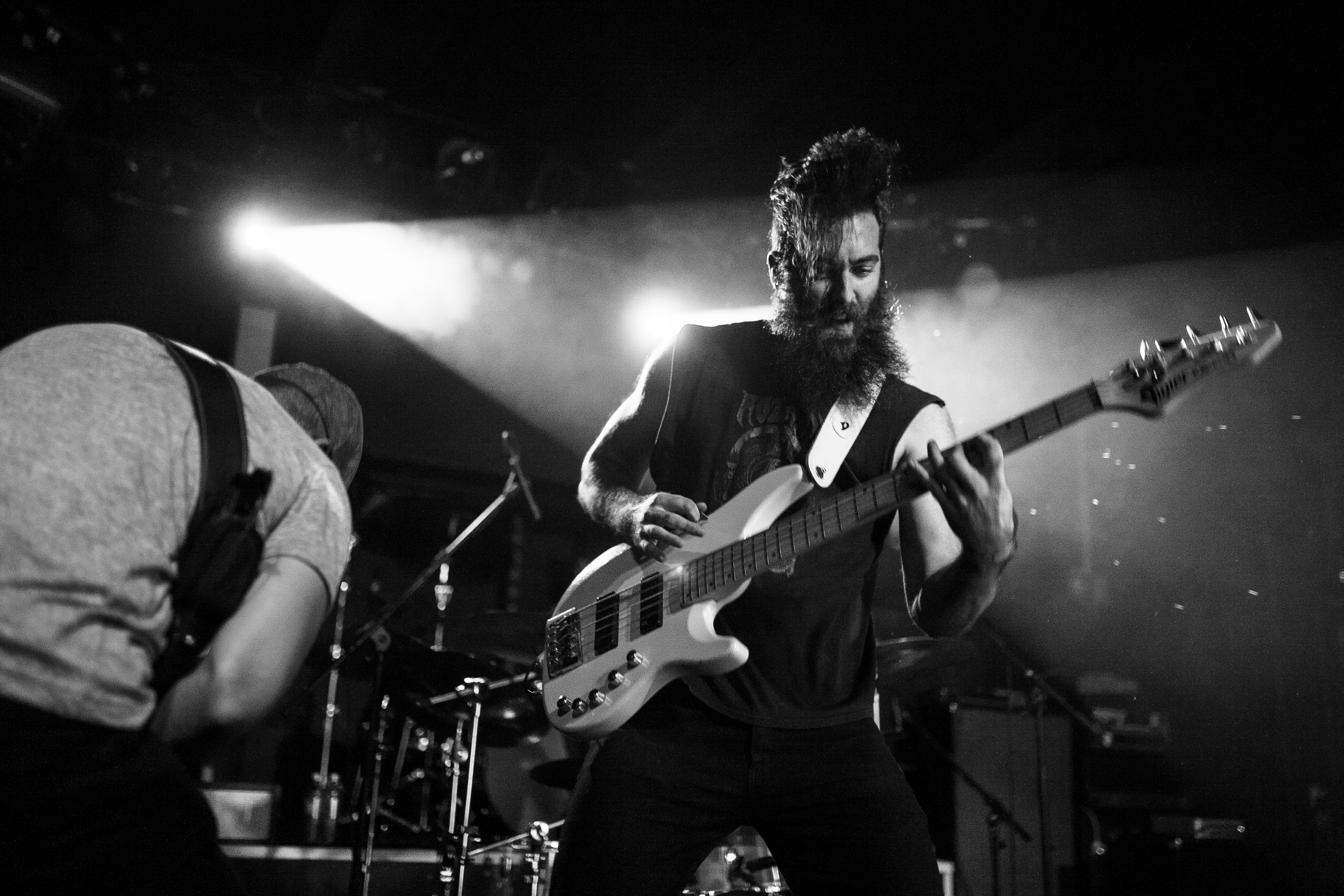

=== Reunion and Wild Gods (2016–present) ===
On May 18, 2016, the band posted an image on their Facebook account which appeared to be a gig flyer, displaying an updated band logo, a short set list of songs from their back-catalogue, and further text on the side stating the date May 19, 2016, and the location of Kingston, New York. Fans raised speculation that this would be a secret show where the band would announce their return.

As speculated, on May 19, 2016, the band played their first show together since January 2010, and frontman Jesse Korman confirmed the following day that the band were back with "News to follow. Maybe." The line-up at the band's return show saw both Korman and guitarist Alexis Pareja performing, completed by Michael Kadnar on drums and DJ Scully on bass.

The band supported The Dillinger Escape Plan on their Limerent Death tour in 2016. Following extensive touring by the band, they announced in fall 2017 an anniversary tour celebrating the 12-year anniversary of Nuclear. Sad. Nuclear.

In February 2019, the band confirmed that they had finished recording their fifth record and first album in a decade. The album, titled Wild Gods, was released on September 20, 2019.

In May 2024, the band embarked on their first tour in five years along with past tour mates The Fall of Troy & Heavy Heavy Low Low. On May 12th, they posted a story on instagram revealing the current lineup of the band which now includes bassist Cody McCorry and drummer Michael DeMarco. On August 16, 2024, it was announced through the band's Instagram that they had signed to Equal Vision Records. It was also announced that a new song, "Eyes on the Fireworks", will be released on August 22. It will be their first new song in 5 years, and first song overall with their new members.

May 2025 a new single was released, "Indeciso". This is in anticipation to their upcoming album, timing unknown.

== Musical style and influences ==
The Number Twelve Looks Like You's music has been described as mathcore, post-hardcore, screamo, emo, and metalcore. AllMusic describes them as a "particularly dark and dystopian form of screamo" that incorporates elements of "Japanese-style noise rock à la the Boredoms and the show-offy tempo, time signature, and dynamic shifts of Frank Zappa." The band tried to expand their sound with every album and Pareja attributes that as a crucial factor in their reunion. Regarding their eclectic style, he said:

We try to throw in stuff from every genre out there and not lock ourselves inside of anything. It’s easy to limit yourself by doing the same old scales and old types of riffs and ideas; you’ve got to break out of that shell. [...] I'm always trying to push the limit, think outside the box and ask myself what I can do that other people aren’t already doing.

— Alexis Pareja, 2007

Founding member Alexis Pareja, a classically trained guitarist, has cited jazz fusion players John McLaughlin and Robert Fripp as some of his primary inspirations. Jesse Korman was trained by vocal coach Melissa Cross and credits screamo bands such as Love Lost But Not Forgotten, pop singer Michael Jackson, death metal bands, and System of a Down as shaping his style. For his part, former co-vocalist Justin Pedrick stated that Tom Waits "musically changed [his] life." In addition to rock music, the band has been deeply influenced by jazz, citing artists such as Mark Guiliana, Tigran Hamasyan, Miles Davis, Avishai Cohen and John Coltrane. The band consider their five biggest musical influences to be Mahavishnu Orchestra, Gorguts, Thee Silver Mt. Zion Memorial Orchestra, Pantera, and This Day Forward.

== Members ==
Current members

- Jesse "Jase" Korman – lead vocals (2001–2010, 2016–present), drums, percussion (2001)
- Alexis Pareja – guitar, keyboards, programming, lap steel, mandolin, strings, auxliary percussion, backing vocals (2001–2010, 2016–present)
- Cody McCorry – bass guitar (2024–present)
- Michael DeMarco – drums, percussion (2024–present)

Former members

- Christopher "Chree" Conger — drums, percussion (2001–2006), guitar (2001)
- Jamie McIlroy — guitar (2001–2008)
- Justin Pedrick — lead vocals (2001–2009)
- Mike "Smoogs" Smagula — bass guitar (2002–2006)
- Jon Karel — drums, percussion (2006–2010), lead vocals (2009–2010)
- Chris Russell — bass guitar (2006–2010)
- DJ Scully – bass guitar, backing vocals (2016–2024)
- Michael Kadnar – drums (2016–2024)

Timeline

== Discography ==
Studio albums

- Put on Your Rosy Red Glasses (2003)
- Nuclear. Sad. Nuclear. (2005)
- Mongrel (2007)
- Worse Than Alone (2009)
- Wild Gods (2019)
- Howls from the Holographic Heart (2026)

EPs

- An Inch of Gold for an Inch of Time (2005)
- The Number Twelve Looks Like You (2007; limited Hot Topic exclusive)
- The Remixes (2008; limited Hot Topic exclusive)

Live albums

- Here at the End of All Things (2008)

== Videography ==
Year	Title	Director
2006	"Like a Cat"	Darren Doane
2007	"Grandfather"	Ron Winter
2019	"Ruin the Smile"	Jesse Korman
2019	"Raised and Erased"	Karen Jerzyk
2024	"Eyes on the Fireworks"	Jeremy Comitas
