= Tent Show Records =

- Parent company: East West Records
- Genre: Indie rock Alternative rock
- Country of origin: United States
- Official website: www.tentshowrecords.com

Tent Show Records is Murder by Death's record label in the EastWest family of labels.

== See also ==
- List of record labels
