= Murder by Death (band) =

American indie rock band

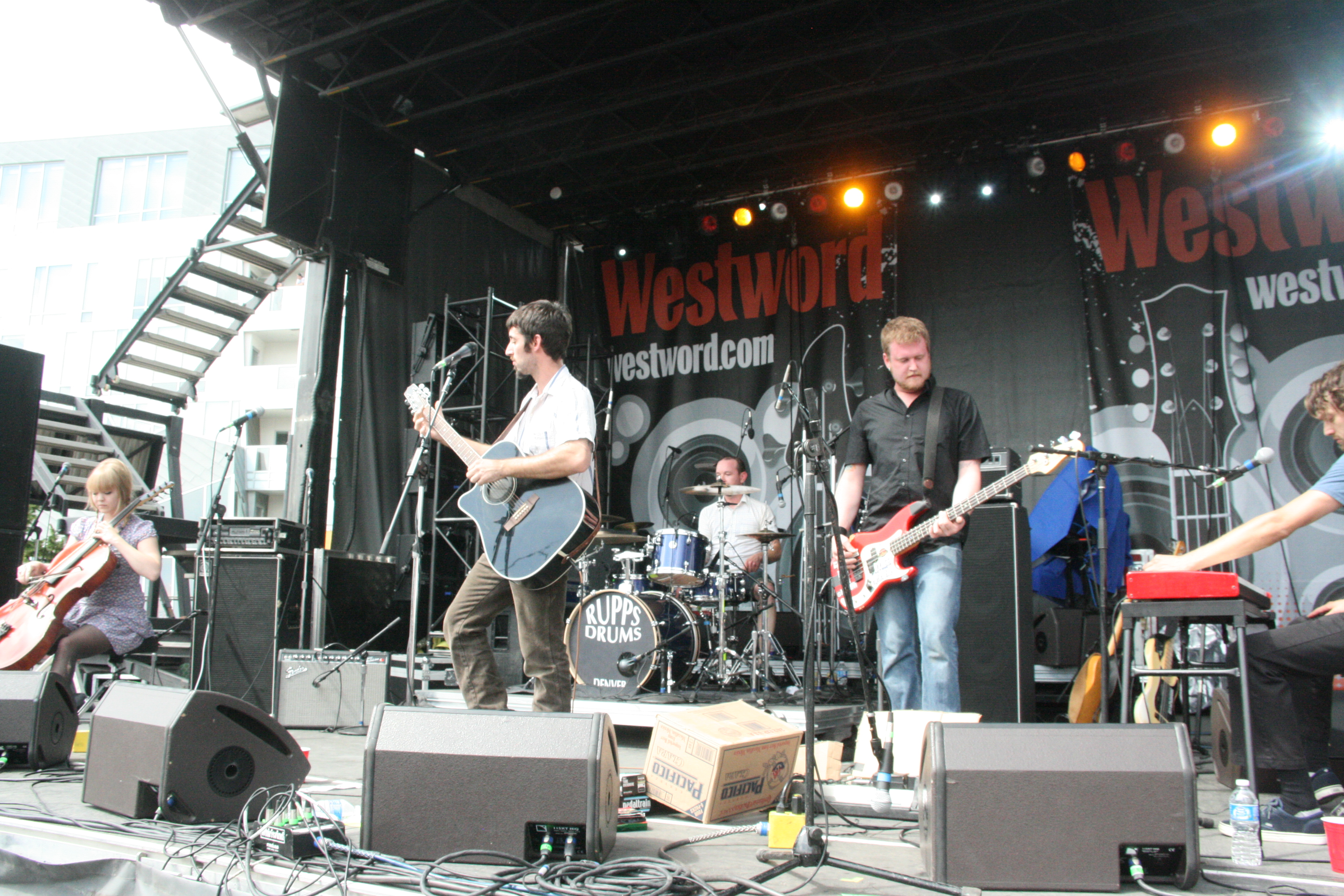
- Murder By Death live in June 2011

Background information
- Also known as: Little Joe Gould (2000–2002)
- Origin: Bloomington, Indiana, United States
- Genres: Indie rock; indie folk; gothic country; alternative country; post-rock; emo (early)
- Years active: 2000–2025
- Labels: Bloodshot, Vagrant, Tent Show, Eyeball, TEAM AV
- Members: Adam Turla; Sarah Balliet; Dagan Thogerson; David Fountain; Tyler Morse; Emma Tiemann
- Past members: Alex Schrodt; Vincent Edwards; Scott Brackett; Matt Armstrong

Murder by Death is an American six-piece indie rock band from Bloomington, Indiana. Their name is derived from the 1976 Robert Moore film of the same name.

Murder by Death released its first studio album (Like the Exorcist, but More Breakdancing) in 2002, and has since released eight more studio albums. The band's final lineup consisted of two founding members, Adam Turla and Sarah Balliet. Balliet played cello for the band, an instrument that has been present consistently throughout the band's evolution. Murder by Death's 2012 album Bitter Drink, Bitter Moon reached #76 on the Billboard 200, making it the band's most successful release.

== History ==
=== Early years (2000–2002) ===
Murder by Death was formed in 2000 in Bloomington, Indiana, by guitarist Adam Turla, cellist Sarah Balliet, percussionist Alexander Schrodt, keyboardist Vincent Edwards, and bassist Matt Armstrong. One of the group's first shows was at the Channing-Murray Foundation's cafe The Red Herring in Urbana, Illinois, with former American Football drummer Steve Lamos' solo project DMS. After the show, the head of the TEAM AV record label with which Lamos was working offered to help Turla and his bandmates secure additional shows. Around the same time the band met Thursday vocalist, Geoff Rickly, when the two bands played on the same bill at a gig in their hometown of Bloomington. Rickly introduced the band, known at the time as Little Joe Gould, to his friend Alex Saavedra (owner of Eyeball Records), who also took an interest in the band.

In 2001 the band self-released the eponymous Little Joe Gould EP and early the next year contributed the song "I'm Afraid of Who's Afraid of Virginia Woolf" to the TEAM AV compilation Foreign Nationals. A short time later the group changed their name to Murder By Death, which they felt better represented their sound.

=== First works (2002–2006) ===
While still performing under the name Little Joe Gould, the band headed out on an 11-date tour stretching from California to Louisiana with the Chicago-based band Volta Do Mar. On this tour the band honed the songs for their debut album, which was recorded in several Chicago studios with Tim Iseler, then a guitarist with the TEAM AV-affiliated band Re:Rec. Both the tour and the recording engineer were arranged by the TEAM AV label, and the resulting Like The Exorcist, But More Breakdancing was released on Eyeball in August 2002. The band extensively toured behind the album with bands such as Cursive, Interpol, and The American Analog Set. In July 2003 the band released a split album with Volta Do Mar entitled Konrad Friedrich Wilhelm Zimmer in honor of the grandfather of the TEAM AV label owner who appears on the cover. Along with the song "Canyon Inn, Room 16" from the Little Joe Gould EP, Murder By Death also contributed "Knife Goes In, Guts Come Out" and the instrumental track "We Watch a Lot of Movies" alongside an alternative version of "A Masters in Reverse Psychology". Konrad Friedrich Wilhelm Zimmer was recorded with producer D. James Goodwin during sessions that would ultimately bear the release of Who Will Survive, and What Will Be Left of Them? in October. In December the band released a tribute 7" single for friend and musician Matt Davis of the band Ten Grand who had died earlier that year, before continuing to tour nationwide with Lucero, The Weakerthans, William Elliott Whitmore, and Rasputina.

"Those Who Left", from Like The Exorcist..., is an eight-minute instrumental, often played live in total darkness. This song is often paired with "Those Who Stayed", a shorter instrumental from the same album. This pairing, played during encores, is seen on setlists as "The Two Evils" or "Medley of Evil".

My Chemical Romance frontman Gerard Way provides guest vocals on Who Will Survive... track "The Devil in Mexico". Thursday frontman Geoff Rickly provides guest vocals on the Who Will Survive... track "Killbot 2000". William Elliott Whitmore provides guest vocals on the Who Will Survive... track "Until Morale Improves, The Beatings Will Continue." According to the band's website, he sang to them through a telephone while he was on the side of the road in Texas.

=== In Bocca Al Lupo (2006–2008) ===
Pianist Vincent Edwards left the band in 2004 in order to return to academia. Cellist Sarah Balliet added keyboard duties to her cello playing. More touring was followed by a stint back at school, during which time the band wrote their third album, In Bocca Al Lupo, which was released in May 2006 on their own label Tent Show Records, an imprint of East West Records. Vocalist/guitarist Adam Turla described the records's inspiration as coming from "a basic idea—sin, in the Dante/Divine Comedy sense—and doing 12 songs that were very unique and about different people." The title is an Italian good luck wish, literally translating as "in the mouth of the wolf" and therefore a likely nod to the language and subject matter of Dante's epic poem, which Turla was reading during the writing of the album. The record also resembles the 1976 murder mystery from which the band takes its name - a pastiche of bad deeds and of good intentions, heroism and forgiveness. Like its predecessor, In Bocca Al Lupo is a concept album, which also builds on the band's previous experimentation with unusual musical styles to include waltzes, jigs and gospel music. The songs are presented in the same Spaghetti Western theme as previous works, but Turla's vocals are sung in a new baritone range, which has been likened by many to that of Johnny Cash. The album was well received and touring continued through the summer of 2006, including headlining shows supported by Langhorne Slim.

=== Red of Tooth and Claw (2008–2010) ===
Red of Tooth and Claw, Murder By Death's fourth album, and first with Vagrant Records, was released in March 2008. Produced by Trina Shoemaker Recorded at Dark Horse Recording Studio and Mixed at East Iris Studios in Nashville, Tennessee, the record features former keyboardist Vincent Edwards on the song "Ball & Chain" and is also the first album to feature new drummer Dagan Thogerson, who replaced founding member Alex Schrodt. It continues with the band's trademark themes: "lust, betrayal, and classical archetypes of good and evil." In Turla's words, the record is an "Homer's Odyssey of revenge, only without the honorable character at the center." The vocals are again sung in the same low, baritone range as In Bocca Al Lupo causing a few critics to speculate that Red of Tooth and Claw breaks less new ground than previous efforts, although in general the album has been well received. As described by allmusic.com the album "carries over some of the Old West outlaw feel of its predecessor, but it's more aggressive and freewheeling here. [...] [The album] isn't a departure for Murder By Death, but their ability to keep their sound fresh and vibrant speaks well of their musical abilities." To celebrate the album's release, Murder By Death played two shows on the same night in their hometown of Bloomington.

The song "Comin' Home" from Red of Tooth and Claw was featured in a trailer for Quentin Tarantino's award-winning film Inglourious Basterds. It was also used in an episode of Sons of Anarchy.

=== Good Morning, Magpie (2010–2012) ===
On January 19, 2010, Murder by Death announced the pending release of their fifth full-length album, Good Morning, Magpie, on April 6 of the same year. Many of its songs were written by vocalist/guitarist Adam Turla during a two-week solo camping trip in the Great Smoky Mountains. Although it is not built around a unifying concept, like several of the band's previous albums, Good Morning, Magpie continues to draw on folklore for inspiration. The title track, as explained by Turla in an interview, is a nod to the superstition that the magpie "has a bit of the devil in him -- and if you don't greet the devil before he sees you he can steal a part of your soul."

After having been a touring member in the fall of 2010, multi-instrumentalist Scott Brackett (of Okkervil River fame) joined as a permanent member in May 2011.

=== Bitter Drink, Bitter Moon (2012) ===
On July 2, 2012, the band announced that their sixth album, Bitter Drink, Bitter Moon, would be released on September 25, 2012, on new label Bloodshot Records. The first single from the album, titled "I Came Around", was released on July 10. On July 11, they released a one-month project for $100,000 on Kickstarter. In total, it raised $187,048, making it the third highest music project on Kickstarter as of August 2012. The Canadian dates on the BDBM tour featured support from post-punk revival group Big John Bates.

The song "Go to the Light" from Bitter Drink, Bitter Moon was originally written for the video game Red Dead Redemption 2 after a member of the band's publicist team notified them that its developer Rockstar Games had reached out to them and other various artists seeking original music for the project. After requesting some changes to the song as-submitted and receiving a new version from the band, Rockstar declined to use the song. The same year, Bungie expressed interest in using "Go to the Light" in its marketing campaign for the Destiny 2 expansion Forsaken, however the band no longer had the original master tracks for the song and needed to re-record it. Bungie requested changes to the song to fit the required trailer format, and after another recording, it was featured in the E3 Story Reveal Trailer for Destiny 2: Forsaken on June 11, 2018. As a result, the song has been recorded by the band four different times.

=== Big Dark Love (2015) ===
On February 3, 2015, the band released their seventh album, Big Dark Love, on Bloodshot Records. A pre-sale of the album through Kickstarter raised $278,486.

=== The Other Shore (2018) ===
On June 1, 2018, the band announced that their eighth album, The Other Shore, would be released on August 24, 2018, on Bloodshot Records. The first single from the album, titled "True Dark", was released on June 26. A Kickstarter for the album raised $327,407.

=== Spell/Bound (2022) ===
On April 29, 2022, the band announced that their ninth studio album, Spell/Bound, would be released on July 29, 2022. The first single from the album, titled "Never Be", was released on May 13. A second single, titled "Everything Must Rest", was released on June 15. A presale of the album through Kickstarter raised $440,439, making it the 7th highest funded Kickstarter project in the music category at the time, surpassing The Other Shore at 11th.

=== Egg & Dart (2025) ===
On March 21, 2025, the band announced that their tenth and potentially final studio album, Egg & Dart will release on June 13, 2025. A presale for the album through Kickstarter was fully funded within 24 hours. The campaign raised $751,818 by the end, surpassing all of the band's previous projects and becoming the third highest-grossing music related Kickstarter at the time. Two singles were released in advance of the album. The first, titled "Wandering", was released on April 10, 2025. The second, titled "Lose You", was released on May 13, 2025.

== Musical style and influences ==
Murder by Death plays a range of music including instrumentals, rock, and alt-country. The band uses cello (with an electric cello for live shows) to create a gothic sound with occasional Western references. Some of their joint influences include the Cure, Iron Maiden, and Prince.

The band arranges themes such as whiskey and the Devil into concept albums. For example, the band's second album, Who Will Survive, and What Will Be Left of Them?, describes a story in which the Devil wages war against a small village in Mexico.

== Members ==
Current

- Adam Turla – lead vocals, guitar, keyboards (2000–present)
- Sarah Balliet – cello, keyboards (2000–present)
- Dagan Thogerson – drums, percussion (2007–present)
- David Fountain – piano, percussion, mandolin, banjo, lap steel, trumpet, accordion, backing vocals (2013–present)
- Tyler Morse – bass, backing vocals (2016–present)
- Emma Tiemann – violin (2020–present)

Former

- Vincent Edwards – keyboards, samples (2000–2004, 2008, 2014)
- Alex Schrodt – drums, percussion (2000–2007)
- Scott Brackett – keyboards, accordion, cornet, theremin, mandolin, backing vocals (2011–2013)
- Matt Armstrong – bass (2000–2016)

== Discography ==
Studio albums

Release date	Title	Billboard 200 peak
2002	Like The Exorcist, But More Breakdancing	-
2003	Who Will Survive, and What Will Be Left of Them?	-
2006	In Bocca al Lupo	-
2008	Red of Tooth and Claw	-
2010	Good Morning, Magpie	No. 200
2012	Bitter Drink, Bitter Moon	No. 76
2015	Big Dark Love	No. 130
2018	The Other Shore	No. 170
2020	Lonesome Holiday	-
2022	Spell/Bound	-
2023	As We Wish	-
2025	Egg & Dart	-

Live albums

Release date	Title	Notes
2025	Live... And Underground	Recorded live at the caverns at Pelham

EPs

Release date	Title	Notes
2000	Little Joe Gould	As Little Joe Gould
2003	Konrad Friedrich Wilhelm Zimmer	Split album with Volta Do Mar
2003	Tribute for Matt Davis	
2008	Fuego!	
2009	Finch Instrumental Soundtrack	

Singles

Release date	Title	Notes
2006	Boy Decide	b-sides: Boy Decide (Alternate), One More Notch (acoustic)
2007	Brother	b-sides: Moon is Up, Brother (Live), Don't Cry (Guns N' Roses cover, on 7")
2007	Sometimes the Line Walks You	b-sides: Dynamite Mine (Demo), Bang Bang (Sonny Bono cover), American Carny Theme
2022	How Long is the Night?	self released non-album single
