= Eyeball Records =

American independent record label

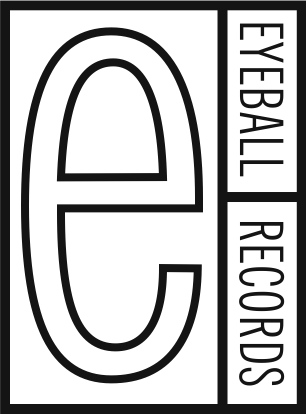
- Founded: 1995
- Founder: Alex Saavedra, Vincent Li
- Genre: Alternative rock, hardcore punk, metalcore
- Country of origin: U.S.
- Official website: www.eyeballrecords.org

Eyeball Records is an independent record label originally established in NYC out of Apartment 4C on 14th St at Avenue A by Alex Saavedra and Vincent Li. The label later moved to Kearny, New Jersey. Eyeball has released albums by artists such as Thursday, My Chemical Romance, and Murder by Death, focusing on indie, alternative rock and punk rock.

In 2020, the label began releasing exclusive cassette with new developing artists. It is currently co-owned by Zac Nadile and Alex Saavedra.

== Artists ==
- 3l3d3p
- 8485
- The Actual
- An Albatross
- Baumer
- BBY Goyard
- The Blackout Pact
- Blackwinterwells
- Bring Me the Horizon
- The Bronze Episode
- Carpetgarden
- E for Explosion
- The Feverfew
- Food Stamps
- The Forecast
- gothboiclique
- Horse Head
- iwrestledabearonce
- Jacobi Witchita
- Jettie
- The Killing Tree
- Karate High School
- Kiss Kiss
- Lit
- Man Without Wax
- Mermaid in a Manhole
- Metroid
- N8NOFACE
- New Atlantic
- New London Fire
- Pompeii
- The Number Twelve Looks Like You
- Rozz Dyliams
- Red City Radio
- Tiger Lou
- Search/Rescue
- Sleep Station
- The Stiletto Formal
- Slug Christ
- Trippjones
- United Nations
- Wolftron
- Downlow
- Thursday
- My Epiphany
- Breakdown
- The Casualties
- L.E.S. Stitches
- Del Cielo
- The Anthem Sound
- Ariel Kill Him
- Gameface
- The Gaslight Anthem
- H_{2}O
- The Kill Van Kull
- Midtown
- Milemarker
- Murder By Death
- The Oval Portrait
- Signal to Noise
- Spit for Athena
- Pencey Prep
- My Chemical Romance
- Humble Beginnings
- Interference
- The Tiny
- The Velocet
- WiFiGawd and Lil Xelly
- Yvncc
- Voice in the Wire
- Going Home
- Zolof the Rock & Roll Destroyer

== Astro Magnetics ==
Astro Magnetics is an imprint label of Eyeball Records and is owned by Marc Debiak, Alex Saavedra and Thursday's Geoff Rickly. Bands include:

- The Blackout Pact
- Baumer
- The Bronze Episode
- Jettie
- Kiss Kiss
- The Lovekill
- Metroid
- The Valley Arena
- Secret Lives of the Freemasons (until June 2007)

== Compilations/demos ==
=== Now That's What I Call Eyeball ===
Track	Title	Time
1	"Different" - New London Fire	04:24
2	"We Don't Bleed" - New London Fire	03:35
3	"Food Chain" - Milemarker	04:59
4	"Pornographic Architecture" - Milemarker	03:45
5	"The Proud Parent's Convention Held in the ER" - The Number Twelve Looks Like You	02:37
6	"Like A Cat" - The Number Twelve Looks Like You	03:31
7	"Final Battle" - My Epiphany	03:43
8	"Body Talk" - My Epiphany	03:50
9	"Argh... I'm a Pirate" - Zolof the Rock & Roll Destroyer	01:53
10	"This Was All a Bad Idea" - Zolof the Rock & Roll Destroyer	02:42

Now That's What I Call Eyeball is occasionally included as a bonus sampler in some re-releases of My Chemical Romance's first studio album, I Brought You My Bullets, You Brought Me Your Love.

=== Reverse Psychology ===
Track	Title
1	"Wire and Stone" - New Atlantic
2	"Machines" - Kiss Kiss
3	"Like A Cat" - The Number Twelve Looks Like You
4	"We Don't Bleed" - New London Fire
5	"Float" - Sean Walsh
6	"Numbers" - Pompeii
7	"The Weather Machine" - Signal To Noise
8	"Dirty Frames" - The Tiny
9	"Chinatown" - The Velocet
10	"Act 7, Scene 8" - Going Home
11	"Home(Again)" - The Feverfew

== See also ==
- List of record labels
