= Lostprophets discography =

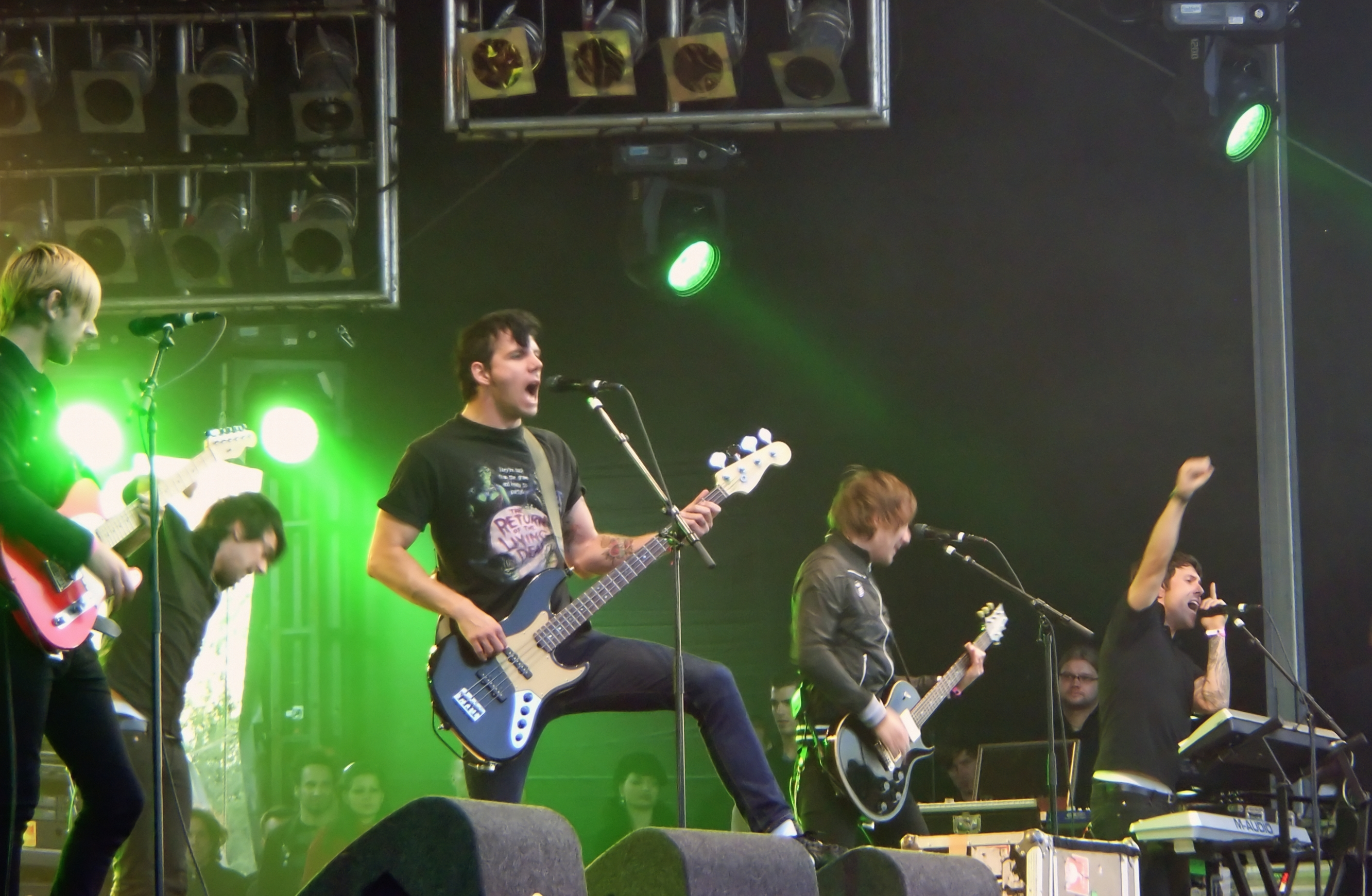
- Lostprophets performing at the Pinkpop Festival in 2007
- Studio albums: 5
- Extended plays: 3
- Singles: 17
- Music videos: 17

The discography of Lostprophets, a Welsh alternative rock band formed in Pontypridd in 1997 and active until 2013, contains five studio albums, three EPs, and seventeen singles.

The band's debut album, The Fake Sound of Progress, was released through Visible Noise in the United Kingdom in October 2000 and was certified gold. The album produced two singles: "Shinobi vs. Dragon Ninja", which was successful in the US, peaking at number thirty-three on the Alternative Songs chart, and the title track "The Fake Sound of Progress".

The lead single from their second album, Start Something, was "Burn Burn" in November 2003, and was originally scheduled to be closely followed by the release of the album. The album was released in the UK in February 2004 and peaked at number four in the UK Albums Chart. The album has sold more than 2.5 million copies worldwide. The second track from Start Something, "Last Train Home", reached number one on the Alternative Songs chart in the US, and peaked at number eight in the UK, making it the band's first UK top-ten single. Other released singles include; "Wake Up (Make a Move)", "Last Summer" and "Goodbye Tonight". In 2004, the album was certified platinum by the British Phonographic Industry in the UK and gold by the RIAA in the US.

The band's third album, Liberation Transmission was released in the UK in June 2006 and put the band at the top of the UK Albums Chart for the first time; it was later certified silver in the UK. Singles from the album were "Rooftops (A Liberation Broadcast)", which peaked at number eight, "A Town Called Hypocrisy", "Can't Catch Tomorrow (Good Shoes Won't Save You This Time)" and "4:AM Forever".

The band's fourth studio album The Betrayed was delayed many times. The title and several tracks were revealed in 5 August issue of Kerrang! magazine, and the album was released on 18 January 2010.

The band's fifth and final studio album Weapons was released on 30 March 2012.

In December 2012, lead singer Ian Watkins was charged with multiple sexual offences against minors, infants and animals. Lostprophets cancelled all tour dates and disbanded in October 2013, before the end of Watkins' trial. Watkins pleaded guilty to several charges. In December 2013, he was sentenced to 29 years of imprisonment plus six years of extended supervision on licence. In June 2014, the remaining members joined American singer Geoff Rickly (then-formerly of Thursday) to form a new band, No Devotion.

== Studio albums ==
Title	Album details	Peak chart positions											Certifications
Title	Album details	UK	AUS	AUT	BEL	FRA	GER	IRL	NLD	NZL	SWI	US	Certifications
The Fake Sound of Progress	Released: 13 October 2000; Label: Visible Noise (#85955); Formats: CD, LP	44	—	—	—	—	—	—	—	—	—	186	BPI: Platinum
Start Something	Released: 2 February 2004; Label: Visible Noise (#86554); Formats: CD, digital download	4	66	60	—	69	51	61	—	14	—	33	BPI: Platinum; RIAA: Gold
Liberation Transmission	Released: 26 June 2006; Label: Visible Noise (#96531); Formats: CD, digital download	1	62	44	74	94	31	30	87	14	34	33	BPI: Platinum
The Betrayed	Released: 13 January 2010; Label: Visible Noise (#7610052); Formats: CD, digital download	3	49	—	—	—	90	42	—	—	—	—	BPI: Gold
Weapons	Released: 30 March 2012; Label: Epic (#88691965682); Formats: CD, LP, digital download	9	55	74	—	—	86	52	—	—	—	145	

== EPs ==
Title	EP details
Here Comes the Party	Released: 1997; Label: Self-released
Para Todas las Putas Celosas	Released: 1998; Label: Self-released
The Fake Sound of Progress	Released: 1999; Label: Self-released

== Singles ==
Title	Year	Peak chart positions										Certification	Album
Title	Year	UK	AUS	GER	IRL	JPN	NZ	SCO	US	US Alt.	US Main.	Certification	Album
"Shinobi vs. Dragon Ninja"	2001	41	—	—	—	—	—	—	—	33	—		The Fake Sound of Progress
"The Fake Sound of Progress"	2002	21	—	—	—	—	—	—	—	—	—		The Fake Sound of Progress
"Burn Burn"	2003	17	48	81	—	—	—	—	—	—	—		Start Something
"Last Train Home"	2004	8	68	48	—	—	—	—	75	1	10		Start Something
"Wake Up (Make a Move)"	2004	18	—	—	—	—	—	—	—	9	16		Start Something
"Last Summer"	2004	13	—	—	—	—	—	—	—	—	—		Start Something
"Goodbye Tonight"	2004	42	—	—	—	—	—	—	—	—	—		Start Something
"I Don't Know" (radio airplay)	2004	—	—	—	—	—	—	—	—	11	24		Start Something
"Rooftops (A Liberation Broadcast)"	2006	8	—	—	36	—	25	—	—	15	22	BPI: Silver	Liberation Transmission
"A Town Called Hypocrisy"	2006	23	—	—	—	—	—	—	—	—	—		Liberation Transmission
"The New Transmission" (radio airplay)	2006	—	—	—	—	—	—	—	—	—	—		Liberation Transmission
"Can't Catch Tomorrow"	2006	35	—	—	—	—	—	—	—	—	—		Liberation Transmission
"4:AM Forever"	2007	34	—	—	—	—	—	—	—	—	—		Liberation Transmission
"It's Not the End of the World, But I Can See It from Here"	2009	16	—	—	—	—	—	17	—	—	—		The Betrayed
"Where We Belong"	2010	32	—	—	—	21	—	28	—	—	—		The Betrayed
"For He's a Jolly Good Felon"	2010	99	—	—	—	—	—	—	—	—	—		The Betrayed
"Bring 'Em Down"	2012	160	—	—	—	—	—	—	—	—	39		Weapons
"We Bring an Arsenal"	2012	—	—	—	—	—	—	—	—	—	—		Weapons
"—" denotes releases that did not chart or was not released.

== Music videos ==
Year	Song	Director(s)
2001	"Shinobi vs. Dragon Ninja" (version 1)	Mike Piscitelli
2001	"Shinobi vs. Dragon Ninja" (version 2)	Mike Piscitelli
2002	"The Fake Sound of Progress"	Mike Piscitelli
2004	"Burn Burn"	Patrick Kiely
2004	"Last Train Home"	Brian Weber
2004	"Wake Up (Make a Move)"	Steven Murashige
2004	"Last Summer"	The Malloys
2005	"Goodbye Tonight"	Steven Oritt
2006	"Rooftops"	Ryan Smith
2006	"A Town Called Hypocrisy"	Ryan Smith
2006	"Can't Catch Tomorrow"	Ryan Smith
2007	"4:AM Forever"	Ryan Smith
2009	"It's Not the End of the World, But I Can See It from Here"	David Allen
2009	"Where We Belong"	
2010	"For He's a Jolly Good Felon"	Starring Alan Ford
2012	"Bring 'Em Down"	JJ Moffat
2012	"We Bring an Arsenal"	
2012	"Jesus Walks"	JJ Moffat

== Other appearances ==
Year	Song	Album	Notes
2001	"Athousandapologies"	Electric Ballroom Presents: Full Tilt, Vol. 3	Original mix
2002	"Shinobi vs. Dragon Ninja"	MTV Handpicked	Various artists
2002	"Five Is A Four Letter Word"	Hardplace: 11 Hardcore Rock Tracks	Various artists
2003	"The Fake Sound of Progress"	Q: The Album	Various artists
2004	"Burn Burn"	Big Day Out 2004 soundtrack	Various artists
2004	"Lucky You"	Spider-Man 2 soundtrack	Recorded for the Spider-Man 2 soundtrack
2007	"Going Underground"	Punk the Clock Volume 3	Cover of The Jam song
2007	"Davidian"	Higher Voltage!: Another Brief History of Rock	Cover of Machine Head song, released June 2007
2009	"Boys Don't Cry"	Pictures of You	Recorded for an album of The Cure covers given away free with NME
2010	"Empire State of Mind"	BBC Live	Recorded with LMFAO
2012	"We Bring an Arsenal"	Epic Stadium Anthems	Various artists
2012	"Earthquake"	BBC Live Lounge	Recorded with Labrinth
