= Goodbye Tonight =

- CD1 single

Single by Lostprophets

from the album Start Something
- Released: 22 November 2004
- Recorded: 2003
- Genre: Alternative rock; pop-punk; emo
- Length: 3:54
- Label: Columbia; Visible Noise
- Songwriters: Mike Chiplin; Lee Gaze; Mike Lewis; Jamie Oliver; Stu Richardson; Ian Watkins
- Producer: Eric Valentine

Lostprophets singles chronology
"I Don't Know" (2004)	"Goodbye Tonight" (2004)	"Rooftops" (2006)

"Goodbye Tonight" is the fifth single from Start Something (2004), the second studio album by the Welsh rock band Lostprophets. It was fairly unsuccessful in comparison to the other singles such as "Burn Burn" and "Last Train Home". The music video for "Goodbye Tonight" stars, along with the band, Mikey Way (from My Chemical Romance) and Adam Lazzara (from Taking Back Sunday), respectively.

== Track listing ==
CD1
No.	Title	Length
1.	"Goodbye Tonight"	3:55
2.	"Burn X2" (No Truth remix – Robot Jox)	3:04

CD2
No.	Title	Length
1.	"Goodbye Tonight"	3:55
2.	"LTH" (Xanex Broken Heart mix)	4:04
3.	"Wake Up and Move" (Nebuchednezzar mix)	3:51

Vinyl
No.	Title	Length
1.	"Goodbye Tonight"	3:55

(The B-side of the vinyl release was an etched design rather than containing music).

== Personnel ==
- Ian Watkins – lead vocals
- Lee Gaze – lead guitar
- Mike Lewis – rhythm guitar
- Stu Richardson – bass guitar
- Jamie Oliver – synth, turntables, samples, vocals
- Mike Chiplin – drums, percussion

== Chart positions ==
Year	Chart	Peak
2004	UK Singles Chart	42
