= Last Summer (song) =

Single by Lostprophets

from the album Start Something
- Released: 23 August 2004
- Recorded: 2003
- Studio: Bigfoot Studios (Los Angeles)
- Genre: Alternative rock
- Length: 4:07
- Label: Columbia; Visible Noise
- Songwriters: Mike Chiplin; Lee Gaze; Mike Lewis; Jamie Oliver; Stu Richardson; Ian Watkins
- Producer: Eric Valentine

Lostprophets singles chronology
"Wake Up (Make a Move)" (2004)	"Last Summer" (2004)	"I Don't Know" (2004)

"Last Summer" is the fourth single from Start Something (2004), the second studio album by the Welsh rock band Lostprophets. The previous singles, "Burn Burn", "Last Train Home" and "Wake Up (Make a Move)" had all been highly successful on both sides of the Atlantic so this single was under similar pressure; it reached number 13 in the UK singles chart. The song describes the band members enjoying past memories of visiting towns in South Wales such as the seaside town of Porthcawl.

The song's B-side, "Sweet Dreams My L.A. Ex", is a cover version of a song by the English pop star, and former member of S Club 7, Rachel Stevens.

== Music video ==
The music video, directed by The Malloys, shows lead singer Ian Watkins driving around Venice, California on the last day of the summer school term. He is driving a car with the plate number 2BAI222. The same plate number is featured in episode one of NUMB3RS and episode one in the second season of The O.C.. As Watkins reaches his destination, the beach, he then goes back to the beginning and drives past the school again but in a different decade — the '70s, '80s, and the present. Around the 3:12 mark, lead singer Daryl Palumbo and bassist Jarvis Morgan Holden of Glassjaw and Head Automatica, respectively (Palumbo was a member of both bands), can be seen walking in front of the school. Also at the 2:04 mark, the metal band Steel Panther (then-known as Metal Skool) are seen in front of the school.

== Track listing ==
CD1
No.	Title	Length
1.	"Last Summer" (radio edit)	3:59
2.	"Sweet Dreams My L.A. Ex" (Rachel Stevens cover)	3:36

CD2
No.	Title	Length
1.	"Last Summer" (radio edit)	3:59
2.	"Reptilia" (The Strokes cover)	3:34
3.	"In the Air Tonight" (Phil Collins cover)	5:23

EP version
No.	Title	Length
1.	"Last Summer" (radio edit)	3:59
2.	"Boys Don't Cry" (The Cure cover)	2:37
3.	"Reptilia" (The Strokes cover)	3:34
4.	"Sweet Dreams My LA Ex" (Rachel Stevens cover)	3:36
5.	"In the Air Tonight" (Phil Collins cover)	5:23

Vinyl
No.	Title	Length
1.	"Last Summer" (radio edit)	3:59
2.	"Boys Don't Cry" (The Cure cover)	2:37

== Personnel ==
- Ian Watkins – lead vocals
- Lee Gaze – lead guitar
- Mike Lewis – rhythm guitar
- Stu Richardson – bass guitar
- Jamie Oliver – synth, turntables, samples, vocals
- Mike Chiplin – drums, percussion

== Chart positions ==
Year	Chart	Peak
2004	UK Singles Chart	13
2004	UK Rock & Metal (OCC)	1
