= A Town Called Hypocrisy =

Single by Lostprophets

from the album Liberation Transmission
- Released: 11 September 2006
- Recorded: 2006
- Studio: The Sound Factory, Hollywood, California and Plantation Mixing and Recording, Maui, Hawaii, US
- Genre: Alternative rock; pop-punk
- Length: 3:39
- Label: Columbia; Visible Noise
- Songwriters: Lee Gaze; Mike Lewis; Jamie Oliver; Stu Richardson; Ian Watkins
- Producer: Bob Rock

Lostprophets singles chronology
"Rooftops" (2006)	"A Town Called Hypocrisy" (2006)	"The New Transmission" (2006)

"A Town Called Hypocrisy" is the second single taken from Liberation Transmission, the third studio album by the Welsh rock band Lostprophets.

The single was released on 11 September 2006 in the United Kingdom. It peaked at No. 23 in the UK Singles Chart making it the band's seventh UK top 40 single. It spent only two weeks in the top 40.

== Music video ==
The music video was made available on Kerrang! TV from their website on 11 August 2006. It depicts frontman Ian Watkins as a children's television presenter on a fictional television show called Town Time and is arguably a response to the accusations of the band's metrosexuality. The video also shows the juxtaposition of attitudes in the band between when they appear during transmission and when they are shown behind the scenes of Town Time. During transmission, it shows the other band members — bar Watkins — dressed as the following (mainly paying homage to the Village People): a toy soldier, a bumbling policeman, a doctor, a builder and a construction worker.

The video, although seemingly based around the things infant children watch (therefore making it seem quite innocent) is filled with sexual references, for example at the beginning when we see Tender Tim (Watkins) and Mayor Mary ending the 5000th episode of Town Time. Tim replies to Mary's question, "What have we learnt today, Tim?" and Tim replies: "We've learnt about sharing, saying 'please' and oral [he pauses here, before Mary nudges him] hygiene". The video also depicts heavy drinking and scantily clad women performing "kinky", yet childlike, activities on the men in the group behind the scenes.

In several frames of the video, it also paid homage to 'Silhouette Blends', the series of spelling clips by The Electric Company. It is the first video by the band not to feature skaters.

The video has since been considered to have aged poorly by many following Watkins' 2012 arrest and subsequent conviction on child sex offences that led to Lostprophets' breakup, as well as his reputation as a disgraced paedophile since then.

== Reception ==
Writing for Drowned in Sound, Ben Yates praised the song, calling it a "catchy piece of slick radio-pop" while criticising what he perceived as excessive post-production, which "strips [the song] of any real passion or energy".

== Track listing ==
CD1
No.	Title	Length
1.	"A Town Called Hypocrisy"	3:42
2.	"Love" (demo)	3:11

CD2
No.	Title	Length
1.	"A Town Called Hypocrisy"	3:42
2.	"Distances" (demo)	3:57
3.	"What You Do" (demo)	3:24

Vinyl
No.	Title	Length
1.	"A Town Called Hypocrisy"	3:42
2.	"Still Falling" (demo)	4:26

== Personnel ==
Musicians

- Ian Watkins – lead vocals
- Jamie Oliver – piano; keyboard; samples; vocals
- Lee Gaze – lead guitar
- Mike Lewis – rhythm guitar
- Stu Richardson – bass guitar
- Josh Freese – drums; percussion (recording)
- Ilan Rubin – drums; percussion (music video)

== Release history ==
Country	Date
United Kingdom	11 September 2006
United States	11 September 2006

== Chart positions ==
Year	Chart	Peak
2006	UK Singles Chart	23
2006	UK Rock & Metal (OCC)	2
2006	European Hot 100 Singles	71
