= Wake Up (Make a Move) =

Single by Lostprophets

from the album Start Something
- Released: 3 May 2004 (United Kingdom)
- Recorded: 2003
- Studio: Bigfoot Studios (Los Angeles)
- Genre: Nu metal
- Length: 3:57 (album version); 3:31 (radio edit)
- Label: Columbia; Visible Noise
- Composer: Lostprophets
- Lyricist: Ian Watkins
- Producer: Eric Valentine

Lostprophets singles chronology
"Last Train Home" (2003)	"Wake Up (Make a Move)" (2004)	"Last Summer" (2004)

"Wake Up (Make a Move)" is the third single from Start Something, the second studio album by the Welsh rock band Lostprophets. "Wake Up (Make a Move)" was released to radio on 1 June 2004. This single was under much debate up to its release; both Lostprophets and their management wanted the dark, brooding "Make a Move" as a single, whereas the label wanted the poppier, catchier "I Don't Know". The band and their management walked away victorious and the song was released as a single with the modified title "Wake Up (Make a Move)". However, "I Don't Know" was later released for radio airplay in the US and made it to number 11 on Billboard's Alternative Songs chart.

A music video was produced for the song and saw moderate MTV airplay upon release.

== Track listing ==
CD1
No.	Title	Length
1.	"Wake Up (Make a Move)" (radio edit) (compressed)	3:34
2.	"Wake Up (Make a Move)" (Chicago Q101 performance)	4:18

CD2
No.	Title	Length
1.	"Wake Up (Make a Move)" (radio edit) (uncompressed)	3:32
2.	"Holding On" (demo)	4:35

Vinyl
No.	Title	Length
1.	"Wake Up (Make a Move)" (radio edit)	3:34
2.	"Start Something" (BBC Radio 1 session)	4:05

== Personnel ==
- Ian Watkins – lead vocals
- Lee Gaze – lead guitar
- Mike Lewis – rhythm guitar
- Stu Richardson – bass guitar
- Jamie Oliver – synth, turntables, samples, vocals
- Mike Chiplin – drums, percussion

== Charts ==
Chart (2004)	Peak position
UK Singles (OCC)	18
UK Indie (OCC)	1
UK Rock & Metal (OCC)	2
US Alternative Airplay (Billboard)	9
US Mainstream Rock (Billboard)	16
