= Rooftops (A Liberation Broadcast) =

Single by Lostprophets

from the album Liberation Transmission
- Released: 16 May 2006
- Recorded: 2006
- Studio: Plantation Mixing and Recording, Maui
- Genre: Alternative rock; emo
- Length: 4:11
- Label: Columbia; Visible Noise
- Songwriters: Lee Gaze; Mike Lewis; Jamie Oliver; Stu Richardson; Ian Watkins
- Producers: Bob Rock; Joel Kaufmann

Lostprophets singles chronology
| "Goodbye Tonight" (2004) | "Rooftops (A Liberation Broadcast)" (2006) | "A Town Called Hypocrisy" (2006) |

Music video
- "Rooftops (A Liberation Broadcast)" on YouTube

"Rooftops (A Liberation Broadcast)" is a power ballad by the Welsh rock band Lostprophets. It was released as the lead single to the band's third studio album Liberation Transmission, first to American radio on 16 May 2006 and then as a physical single on 19 June 2006, preceding the album's release by a week.

The song debuted at No. 8 on the UK singles chart, tying "Last Train Home" for the band's highest-peaking song. It was nominated for the Kerrang! Award for Best Single. In the United States, it peaked at No. 15 on the Alternative Airplay chart.

== Background ==
The first live performance of the single in the UK was in the Muni Arts Centre in Pontypridd on 24 April 2006 prior to it receiving radio play. The B-sides found on the single came from the same sessions – all of which were new tracks.

== Music video ==
The music video for the song was filmed on location in Los Angeles, California and was directed by Ryan Smith. It shows the band performing on what appears to be a helicopter pad at the top of a tall building (possibly a hospital or a news station). At the beginning, the individual band members are shown while a flag showing the band's logo flutters behind them. As the band begins, three teenagers are shown: a girl sitting at dinner with her parents, who suddenly start arguing, a boy sitting in the back seat of a car as his father shouts at him while driving and another boy working in a restaurant kitchen as his boss starts berating at him. When the band reaches the "scream your heart out" refrain near the end of the song, the teenagers start to scream suddenly: the girl shatters every wine glass on the table as her mother covers her ears, the boy in the kitchen blows plates off the shelf in front of him, and the boy in the car shatters the car's windows. Another group of teenagers are then shown on the helicopter pad, in front of the same flag the band members were in front of at the beginning of the video, during the final chorus. The band then finishes the song, and the video fades out.

== Track listing ==
CD1
| No. | Title | Length |
|---|---|---|
| 1. | "Rooftops (A Liberation Broadcast)" | 4:13 |
| 2. | "Ordinary Life" (demo) | 3:24 |

CD2
| No. | Title | Length |
|---|---|---|
| 1. | "Rooftops (A Liberation Broadcast)" | 4:13 |
| 2. | "Dead to Me" (demo) | 3:25 |
| 3. | "No Way Out" (demo) | 3:52 |

Vinyl
| No. | Title | Length |
|---|---|---|
| 1. | "Rooftops (A Liberation Broadcast)" | 4:13 |

(The B side of the vinyl release was an etched design rather than containing music)

Digital download
| No. | Title | Length |
|---|---|---|
| 1. | "Rooftops" (demo) | 4:08 |

== Personnel ==
- Ian Watkins – lead vocals
- Lee Gaze – lead guitar
- Mike Lewis – rhythm guitar
- Stu Richardson – bass guitar
- Jamie Oliver – piano, keyboard, samples, vocals
- Josh Freese – drums, percussion (recording)
- Ilan Rubin – drums, percussion (music video)

== Charts ==
| Chart (2006) | Peak position |
|---|---|
| Ireland (IRMA) | 36 |
| New Zealand (Recorded Music NZ) | 25 |
| UK Singles (Official Charts) | 8 |
| UK Indie (Official Charts) | 1 |
| UK Rock & Metal (OCC) | 2 |
| US Bubbling Under Hot 100 (Billboard) | 14 |
| US Pop 100 (Billboard) | 94 |
| US Alternative Airplay (Billboard) | 15 |
| US Mainstream Rock (Billboard) | 22 |

== Certifications ==
| Region | Certification | Certified units/sales |
|---|---|---|
| United Kingdom (BPI) | Silver | 200,000^{‡} |
^{‡} Sales+streaming figures based on certification alone.

== Release history ==
Release dates and formats for "Rooftops (A Liberation Broadcast)"
| Region | Date | Format | Label(s) | Ref. |
|---|---|---|---|---|
| United States | 28 August 2006 | Mainstream airplay | Columbia | |

== Other media ==
- The song was included as a playable track in the video games Guitar Hero World Tour and Lego Rock Band.
- WWE used the song as the background track for a promotional video highlighting the career of Jeff Hardy. However, on the WWE Network, the song has been replaced due to the sexual offences of Ian Watkins.
