= Public Disturbance =

Public Disturbance may mean:

- Civil disorder, a broad term used for various forms of unrest
- Public Disturbance (band), a hardcore punk band from South Wales, formed in 1995
