= Last Train Home (Lostprophets song) =

Single by Lostprophets

from the album Start Something
- Released: 27 December 2003
- Recorded: 2003
- Studio: Barefoot Studios (Los Angeles)
- Genre: Nu metal; alternative metal; post-grunge; hard rock; emo
- Length: 4:35 (album version); 4:04 (radio edit)
- Label: Columbia; Visible Noise
- Songwriters: Mike Chiplin; Lee Gaze; Mike Lewis; Jamie Oliver; Stu Richardson; Ian Watkins
- Producer: Eric Valentine

Lostprophets singles chronology
| "Burn Burn" (2003) | "Last Train Home" (2003) | "Wake Up (Make a Move)" (2004) |

Music video
- "Last Train Home" on YouTube

"Last Train Home" is a song by the Welsh rock band Lostprophets, released in December 2003 as the second single from their second album Start Something. The song was the band's highest charting single in the UK up to that point, later tied with "Rooftops (A Liberation Broadcast)" off of their follow-up. It quickly became their most successful single in the United States, reaching No. 75 on the Billboard Hot 100 and number one on Billboard's Alternative Songs chart. "Last Train Home" was released to radio on 27 December 2003.

== Release and reception ==
"Last Train Home" was released on 27 December 2003 and quickly became the most successful single from Start Something, propelling it to becoming the band's biggest hit. The song peaked at number one on the Billboard Alternative Songs chart and number ten on the Billboard Mainstream Rock Tracks chart in the spring of 2004. "Last Train Home" is the second Lostprophets single to ever chart in the U.S., the first one being "Shinobi vs. Dragon Ninja". The song won the Kerrang! Award for Best Single.

The song had managed to beat fellow UK rock band The Darkness' hit single "I Believe in a Thing Called Love" (released in September 2003), charting twelve spots higher on Billboard's Mainstream Rock charts upon release in December 2003, becoming the highest charting single in the United States from any UK artist in 2003.

The song gained much popularity in the United States through radio airplay and the music video saw regular rotation on MTV. The song would later be ranked number 10 on Billboard's year-end rock charts in the United States.

Johnny Loftus of AllMusic said, "'Last Train Home' was an absolute masterpiece of a single mixing board surgery, flawlessly, brazenly binding the properties of three of California's most marketable acts into one monster of an alternative rock anthem, sung by a bunch of immaculately T-shirted dudes from Pontypridd. Beginning with an instrumental run through its unstoppable chorus, the song drifted into faraway echoes of piano as vocalist Ian Watkins emoted vaguely meaningful lyrics like 'Love was once apart / But now it's disappeared'".

Kirk Miller of Rolling Stone said "Last Train Home" is "one of the catchiest hard-rock songs to hit the radio in the past three years. Singer Ian Watkins has Mike Patton's croon/scream down cold, and his group deftly applies FNM's anything-goes approach: equal parts thrash riffs, symphonic keyboards and moody jazz intervals".

"Last Train Home" was also the song that introduced Geoff Rickly to Lostprophets. Rickly would go on to form No Devotion with the other members after Watkins was convicted of sex offences in 2013.

== In other media ==
The song appears in the soundtrack for the video game NFL Street, released in January 2004.

== Music video ==
The music video was directed by Brian Scott Weber and was shot in various Downtown Los Angeles locations in November 2003. In addition to receiving frequent radio airplay in the United States, the video would see frequent rotation on MTV from 2003 to 2005. The band are seen performing on a truck bed, surrounded by multiple fans. The shots of the band are intercut with footage of several fans skateboarding and driving around the city in a Chevrolet Impala. Ian Watkins wears a Pittsburgh Strikers (an amateur football club in Western Pennsylvania) T-shirt during the video.

== Track listing ==
CD1
| No. | Title | Length |
|---|---|---|
| 1. | "Last Train Home" (radio edit) | 4:04 |
| 2. | "Cry Me a River" (BBC Radio One session) (Justin Timberlake cover) | 5:00 |

CD2
| No. | Title | Length |
|---|---|---|
| 1. | "Last Train Home" (radio edit) | 4:04 |
| 2. | "Last Train Home" (demo) | 4:40 |
| 3. | "The Politics of Emotion" (demo) | 3:22 |

EP version
| No. | Title | Length |
|---|---|---|
| 1. | "Last Train Home" (radio edit) | 4:04 |
| 2. | "The Politics of Emotion" (demo) | 3:22 |
| 3. | "Cry Me a River" (BBC Radio One session) (Justin Timberlake cover) | 5:00 |
| 4. | "Shinobi vs. Dragon Ninja" (acoustic) | 3:04 |
| 5. | "Last Train Home" (demo) | 4:10 |

Vinyl
| No. | Title | Length |
|---|---|---|
| 1. | "Last Train Home" (radio edit) | 4:04 |
| 2. | "Shinobi vs. Dragon Ninja" (acoustic) | 3:04 |

== Personnel ==
- Ian Watkins – lead vocals
- Lee Gaze – lead guitar
- Mike Lewis – rhythm guitar
- Stu Richardson – bass guitar
- Mike Chiplin – drums, percussion
- Jamie Oliver – synth, turntables, samples, vocals
- Benji Madden – writer, additional group vocals
- Billy Martin – additional group vocals

== Charts ==
| Chart (2003–2004) | Peak position |
|---|---|
| Australia (ARIA) | 68 |
| Canada Rock Top 30 (Radio & Records) | 14 |
| Germany (GfK) | 48 |
| UK Singles (Official Charts) | 8 |
| UK Airplay (Music Week) | 42 |
| UK Indie (Official Charts) | 1 |
| UK Rock & Metal (OCC) | 2 |
| US Billboard Hot 100 | 75 |
| US Alternative Airplay (Billboard) | 1 |
| US Mainstream Rock (Billboard) | 10 |

== Certifications ==
| Region | Certification | Certified units/sales |
|---|---|---|
| United Kingdom (BPI) | Silver | 200,000^{‡} |
^{‡} Sales+streaming figures based on certification alone.
