= Burn Burn (song) =

Single by Lostprophets

from the album Start Something
- Released: 3 November 2003
- Recorded: 2003
- Studio: Bigfoot Studios (Los Angeles)
- Genre: Nu metal
- Length: 3:36 (album version); 3:26 (radio edit)
- Label: Columbia; Visible Noise
- Songwriters: Mike Chiplin; Lee Gaze; Mike Lewis; Jamie Oliver; Stu Richardson; Ian Watkins
- Producer: Eric Valentine

Lostprophets singles chronology
"The Fake Sound of Progress" (2002)	"Burn Burn" (2003)	"Last Train Home" (2003)

"Burn Burn" is the first single from Start Something (2004), the second studio album from the Welsh rock band Lostprophets. The music video for the single was filmed in The Roundhouse, Camden, London.

== Release and reception ==
"Burn Burn" was released in the winter of 2003 and became one of the most successful songs from Start Something in Europe and Australia. "Burn Burn" charted at 81 on the German Single Chart and on 48 on the Australian Singles Chart. "Burn Burn" is the band's only single to chart in Germany.

Dan Martin of NME described the song as "It's still metal, but wonder at how the single 'Burn Burn' gleams more with the spirit of glam than downtuned riff rock". Kirk Miller of Rolling Stone said "Standouts such as 'Last Train Home' and 'Burn Burn' hint at something awesome. In the meantime, it's a kick-ass tribute".

== In other media ==
The song was featured in the soundtrack of the 2003 Football simulation video game FIFA Football 2004.

"Burn Burn" was also planned to be featured in the soundtrack of the 2015 motorsport racing simulator video game Project CARS, but was shortly removed due to the discovery of the sexual offences committed by Ian Watkins.

== Track listing ==
CD1
No.	Title	Length
1.	"Burn Burn" (radio edit)	3:26
2.	"Our Broken Hearts" (Scene from Top Gun 2)	3:19
3.	"Like a Fire" (demo)	4:03

Enhanced materials
No.	Title	Length
1.	"Burn Burn" (music video)	3:21
2.	"Burn Burn" (lyrics content)	3:26
3.	"Photo Gallery" (slideshow)

CD2
No.	Title	Length
1.	"Burn Burn" (radio edit)	3:26
2.	"Lucky You"	4:34
3.	"Push Out the Jive, Bring in the Love" (demo)	3:26

Vinyl
No.	Title	Length
1.	"Burn Burn" (radio edit)	3:26
2.	"Our Broken Hearts" (demo)	3:19

== Personnel ==
- Ian Watkins – lead vocals
- Lee Gaze – lead guitar
- Mike Lewis – rhythm guitar
- Stu Richardson – bass guitar
- Mike Chiplin – drums, percussion
- Jamie Oliver – synth, turntables, samples, vocals

== Chart positions ==
Chart (2003)	Peak position
Australian Singles Chart	48
German Singles Chart	81
UK Singles Chart	17
UK Indie (OCC)	1
UK Rock & Metal (OCC)	1
