= Liberation Transmission =

Studio album by Lostprophets
- Released: 26 June 2006
- Recorded: 2005–2006
- Studios: The Sound Factory, Hollywood, California and Plantation Mixing and Recording, Maui, Hawaii, US
- Genres: Alternative rock; pop-punk; emo; post-hardcore; emo pop
- Length: 48:51
- Labels: Visible Noise; Columbia
- Producer: Bob Rock

Lostprophets chronology
Start Something (2004)	Liberation Transmission (2006)	The Betrayed (2010)

Singles from Liberation Transmission
- 1. "Rooftops (A Liberation Broadcast)" Released: 16 May 2006; 2. "A Town Called Hypocrisy" Released: 11 September 2006; 3. "The New Transmission" Released: 3 October 2006 (radio airplay); 4. "Can't Catch Tomorrow (Good Shoes Won't Save You This Time)" Released: 27 November 2006; 5. "4:AM Forever" Released: 23 April 2007

Liberation Transmission is the third studio album by the Welsh rock band Lostprophets, released on 26 June 2006 by Visible Noise.

== Recording ==
This is the first Lostprophets album recorded without original drummer Mike Chiplin. Josh Freese drummed at the request of Bob Rock, but the band's first choice was Travis Barker. Ilan Rubin also played drums for the songs "Everybody's Screaming!!!" and "For All These Times Son, for All These Times".

== Release ==
"Rooftops (A Liberation Broadcast)" was released to American radio on 16 May 2006. On 13 June, "For All These Times Son, For All These Times" was made available for streaming via the band's Myspace profile. On 25 June, the album was made available for streaming via Alternative Press, and was a day later through Columbia. From late August to mid October, the band went on a headlining tour of the US with support from Kill Hannah, the Rasmus and Eighteen Visions. "The New Transmission" was released to American radio on 3 October. Following this, they went on another US tour later in October and running into November. The band was supported by Take the Crown and the Transit War. In November and December, the band went on a brief UK tour with support from This Is Hell.

Despite the success of "Rooftops" as a single in America, the album failed to match sales of its predecessor, and has not received any certification by the RIAA as of 2023.

== Critical reception ==
Professional ratings
Aggregate scores
Source	Rating
Metacritic	73/100
Review scores
Source	Rating
AllMusic	link
Drowned in Sound	(7/10)
Entertainment Weekly	B−
IGN	5.6/10
Kerrang!	5/5 stars
Melodic	3/5 stars
NME	(8/10)
Rock Sound	4/5 stars
Rocklouder	link
Sputnikmusic	link

Initial critical response to Liberation Transmission was positive. At Metacritic the album received an average score of 73, based on 7 reviews. There were many positive reviews. NME said "Lostprophets are big and brash and brilliant. And this is rock'n'roll radio." Drowned in Sound said "While Liberation Transmission may be a lyrical vacuum, it is also a musical masterclass in how to create 12 tracks of killer with almost no filler." One of the mixed reviews was Entertainment Weekly who gave it a B− and said, "Around the world, 15-year-olds will fall for this band. Then they will turn 16 and move on", while Observer Music Monthly followed saying "Lyrically absurd, musically turbo-fueled."

It became the first and only Lostprophets album to enter the UK Albums Chart at number one (2 July for 1 week). The album peaked at No. 33 on the Billboard 200 album chart with 27,000 copies sold. By August 2006, the album had sold over 75,000 copies in the US. The album has gone Platinum in the UK and was the 94th best selling album of 2006, with sales over 210,000 units.

== References to other songs ==
"Everybody's Screaming!" has the outro, "It's not over, not over, not over, not over yet", a reference to the song, "Not Over Yet" by dance act Grace. According to Ian Watkins at local music show The Full Ponty, this song was written about how the bandmates hated their jobs. They went going out dancing at a club in Pontypridd after a bad week at work, and "Not Over Yet" was a song that they'd dance to every week.

== Track listing ==
All tracks are written by Lostprophets.

No.	Title	Length
1.	"Everyday Combat" (featuring Sean Smith of the Blackout)	5:11
2.	"A Town Called Hypocrisy"	3:40
3.	"The New Transmission"	3:33
4.	"Rooftops (A Liberation Broadcast)"	4:11
5.	"Can't Stop, Gotta Date with Hate"	3:42
6.	"Can't Catch Tomorrow (Good Shoes Won't Save You This Time)"	3:36
7.	"Everybody's Screaming!!!"	3:52
8.	"Broken Hearts, Torn Up Letters and the Story of a Lonely Girl"	4:04
9.	"4:AM Forever"	4:27
10.	"For All These Times Son, For All These Times"	3:54
11.	"Heaven for the Weather, Hell for the Company"	4:13
12.	"Always All Ways (Apologies, Glances and Messed Up Chances)"	4:25
Total length:		48:51

Japanese limited edition bonus DVD
No.	Title	Length
1.	"Rooftops (A Liberation Broadcast)" (music video)	4:07
2.	"Last Train Home" (music video)	4:12

== Release history ==
Country	Date
South Korea	26 June 2006
United Kingdom	26 June 2006
Canada	27 June 2006
United States	27 June 2006

== Charts ==
Chart (2006)	Peak position
Australian Albums Chart	62
Austrian Albums Charts	44
Belgian Albums Chart (Flanders)	74
Canadian Albums (Billboard)	69
Dutch Albums Charts	87
European Top 100 Albums	13
French Albums Charts	94
German Albums Chart	31
Irish Albums Chart	30
Japanese Albums Chart	11
New Zealand RIANZ Album Charts	14
Swiss Albums Top 100	34
UK Albums Chart	1
UK Independent Albums (Official Charts)	1
UK Rock & Metal Albums (Official Charts)	1
US Top Rock Albums	9
US Billboard 200	33
US Billboard Comprehensive Albums	33

== Certifications ==
Region	Certification	Certified units/sales
United Kingdom (BPI)	Platinum	300,000^{^}
^{*} Sales figures based on certification alone.

== Personnel ==
Credits are adapted from the Liberation Transmission liner notes.

Lostprophets

- Ian Watkins – lead vocals
- Lee Gaze – lead guitar
- Mike Lewis – rhythm guitar
- Stu Richardson – bass guitar
- Jamie Oliver – piano; keyboards; samples; vocals

Additional musicians

- Josh Freese – drums; percussion (tracks: 1–6, 8, 9, 11, 12)
- Ilan Rubin – drums; percussion (tracks: 7, 10)
- Sean Smith (credited as Sean Blackout) – additional vocals on "Everyday Combat"

Production

- Bob Rock – producer; engineer
- Eric Helmkamp – engineer
- Randy Staub – mixer
- Zach Blackstone – assistant engineer
- George Marino – mastering engineer
