= The Fake Sound of Progress =

Studio album by Lostprophets
- Released: 13 October 2000
- Recorded: 2000
- Studio: DEP International Studios
- Genres: Post-hardcore; nu metal
- Length: 52:17 (original version); 49:48 (remastered version)
- Labels: Visible Noise (original version); Columbia (remastered version)
- Producer: Dan Sprigg

Lostprophets chronology
The Fake Sound of Progress (EP) (1999)	The Fake Sound of Progress (2000)	Start Something (2004)

Singles from The Fake Sound of Progress
- 1. "Shinobi vs. Dragon Ninja" Released: 26 November 2001; 2. "The Fake Sound of Progress" Released: 11 March 2002

The Fake Sound of Progress (stylized as thefakesoundofprogress) is the debut studio album by the Welsh rock band Lostprophets, originally released on 13 October 2000 through Visible Noise. The album would be released in 2001 by Columbia Records and was met with stronger sales numbers around the world. This is the only album to feature DJ Stepzak although he was only in the original version, and the first album to have Jamie Oliver although he was only in the remastered version.

The album peaked at number 186 on the Billboard 200, selling over 120,000 copies in the United States alone, and reached high positions on charts worldwide. Two singles were released from the album: "Shinobi vs. Dragon Ninja" and its title track; these singles helped Lostprophets reach mainstream popularity. In 2010, the album was certified platinum by the BPI in the United Kingdom.

== Recording ==
The band began work on the album in 2000, after finding a suitable bass player. Much of the album started as quickly-recorded demos from The Fake Sound of Progress EP. The song "MOAC Supreme" became "A Thousand Apologies", and "Directions" was released as the B-side for the single "Shinobi vs. Dragon Ninja". The album was recorded in one week for around £4000, and while originally intended as another demo, went on to be released on Visible Noise Records in late 2000. Because of the album's shortened recording process, the band were unhappy with the end result. The title of their second studio album Start Something refers to this, as they felt it better reflected their music abilities.

When the band signed to Columbia Records in 2001, it was partly re-recorded and remixed by Michael Barbiero, and re-released that same year. The title track of the album, in addition to being partially re-recorded, was also sped up significantly.

== Release ==
The album didn't initially receive much attention, but entered the Billboard 200 chart following the release of the first single from the album, "Shinobi vs. Dragon Ninja". On Friday 1 March 2002 the album was certified Silver by the British Phonographic Industry (BPI) and on Friday 26 April 2002 the album was certified Gold by the British Phonographic Industry. According to Rolling Stone the album has sold more than 120 thousand copies in the United States and 250 thousand copies in the United Kingdom.

At the end of April 2002, The Fake Sound of Progress peaked at 186 on the Billboard 200, 13 on the Top Heatseekers, 9 on the Top Heatseekers West North Central and 8 on the Top Heatseekers Mountain chart in the United States. The album first charted on the UK Albums Chart at 116 in 2001, in 2002 it peaked at its peak position 44 and after the release of Start Something in 2004 the album re-charted and peaked at 166. Two singles were released from the album; "Shinobi vs. Dragon Ninja" which peaked at 33 on the Hot Modern Rock Tracks chart, and "The Fake Sound of Progress", which peaked at 21 on the UK Singles chart without charting abroad.

== Reception ==
Professional ratings
Review scores
Source	Rating
AllMusic	2/5 stars
Drowned in Sound	10/10
Panorama	4/6 stars

When released, the album was met with mixed reviews by music critics, comparing it to American bands such as Faith No More, Incubus, Korn, Linkin Park, and Limp Bizkit. Scene Point Blank wrote that on the album, the band "combined the versatility of Faith No More and the radio-appeal of Incubus with the charm of their countrymen Duran Duran." Allmusic reviewer Brian O'Neil gave the album two out of five stars and said that "the only redeeming quality is the great production by Michael Barbiero, that allows all instruments to be heard perfectly in all their ennui-inducing glory, proving that no matter how much you polish up a turd, it's still a turd." O'Neil also noted similarities between vocalist Ian Watkins and Faith No More's Mike Patton, commenting that "whether it [is] sweet melodic intervention, the pseudo-rapping, or maniacal screaming, the entire Faith No More repertoire seems to be unleashed in The Fake Sound of Progress." Ben Rayner from Drowned in Sound gave the album 10 out of 10 stars and quoted "in the world of Lost Prophets it's very easy to find something different with every listen with their non-chaotic but well textured tunes." NME reviewer John Mulvey called the album "weirdly impressive", while no stars were given the album got a positive review.

== Tour ==
After the release of the album, Lostprophets went on a tour in Europe and America. Before the release of "Shinobi vs. Dragon Ninja", the band went on a brief tour with the fellow British rock band Muse. They toured Austria and Germany together from 21–27 October 2001. The band would also tour for the NME Carling Awards Tour which featured dates in the London Astoria among others. They also took part in the successful Nu-Titans tour with Defenestration and other famous British metal bands. The band subsequently toured on the Irish leg of Ozzfest. They had also played at the Glastonbury and the Reading and Leeds Festivals. In 2002, the band headlined the Deconstruction Tour in Finsbury Park, London on 3 June; supporting acts were Mighty Mighty Bosstones, The Mad Caddies among other well-known artists. In October, Lostprophets returned to the UK for a tour visiting big cities such as Glasgow, Manchester and London.

== Track listing ==
All lyrics written by Ian Watkins, all music composed by Lostprophets.

Original version
No.	Title	Length
1.	"Obscure Intro"	0:25
2.	"Shinobi vs. Dragon Ninja"	2:47
3.	"The Fake Sound of Progress"	6:19
4.	"Interlude"	0:48
5.	"Five Is a Four Letter Word"	4:26
6.	"...And She Told Me to Leave"	5:06
7.	"Interlude"	1:00
8.	"Kobrakai"	5:34
9.	"The Handsome Life of Swing"	2:41
10.	"Interlude"	1:13
11.	"A Thousand Apologies"	4:05
12.	"Still Laughing"	4:13
13.	"Interlude"	1:35
14.	"For Sure"	4:20
15.	"Awkward"	4:25
16.	"Ode to Summer"	3:20
Total length:		52:17

Remastered version
No.	Title	Length
1.	"Shinobi vs. Dragon Ninja"	2:47
2.	"The Fake Sound of Progress"	5:32
3.	"Five Is a Four Letter Word"	4:24
4.	"...And She Told Me to Leave"	5:55
5.	"Kobrakai"	5:33
6.	"The Handsome Life of Swing"	3:49
7.	"A Thousand Apologies"	4:06
8.	"Still Laughing"	5:43
9.	"For Sure"	4:20
10.	"Awkward"	4:24
11.	"Ode to Summer"	3:15
Total length:		49:48

Japanese bonus tracks
No.	Title	Length
12.	"The Lesson Pt. 1"	3:12
13.	"Directions"	4:55
Total length:		55:15

== Personnel ==
=== 2000 original ===
Lostprophets

- Ian Watkins – vocals, art direction
- Lee Gaze – lead guitar
- Mike Lewis – rhythm guitar
- Stu Richardson – bass guitar
- DJ Stepzak – synth, turntables, samples
- Mike Chiplin – drums, percussion

Production

- Dan Sprigg – production, mixing
- Guy Davie – mastered, mixing
- Neil Harding – mastered, mixing
- Jamie Travers – recording, additional production
- Julie Weir – Visible Noise A&R

=== 2001 remaster ===
Lostprophets

- Ian Watkins – vocals, art direction
- Lee Gaze – lead guitar
- Mike Lewis – rhythm guitar
- Stuart Richardson – bass guitar
- Jamie Oliver – synth, turntables, samples
- Mike Chiplin – drums, percussion

Production

- Dan Sprigg – production, mixing, recording
- Vlado Meller – mastered
- Michael Barbiero – additional production, additional mixing
- Julie Weir – Visible Noise A&R
- Gerard Babitts – Columbia A&R

== Chart positions ==
=== Albums ===
Year	Chart	Position
2001	US Top Heatseekers (West North Central)	8
2001	US Top Heatseekers (Mountain)	9
2001	US Top Heatseekers	13
2001	US Billboard 200	186
2001	UK Album Charts	44
2002	UK Album Charts	116
2004	UK Album Charts	166

=== Singles ===
Year	Name	Chart	Peak
2001	"Shinobi vs. Dragon Ninja"	Modern Rock Tracks	33
2001	"Shinobi vs. Dragon Ninja"	UK Singles Chart	41
2001	"Shinobi vs. Dragon Ninja"	UK Singles Chart	161
2002	"The Fake Sound of Progress"	UK Singles Chart	21

== Certifications ==
Region	Certification	Certified units/sales
United Kingdom (BPI)	Gold	100,000^{^}
^{^} Shipments figures based on certification alone.

== Release history ==
Year	Region	Date	Format	Label	Catalogue #	Notes
2000	United Kingdom	13 October	CD	Visible Noise	TORMENT5CD	Promo copies list track 1 as "Intro" and list the tracks in the wrong order.
2001	United Kingdom	8 October	CD	Visible Noise	TORMENT10CD	Re-release; available in two colours. Standard clear jewel case cover and limited edition blue jewel case cover.
2001	North America	4 December	CD	Columbia	CK 85955	Re-release
2001	Japan	19 December	CD	Epic	EICP-30	Re-release version, features the two bonus tracks.
2003	United Kingdom	23 February	12" vinyl	Visible Noise	TORMENT10LP	Track listing features shorter titles.
