= Defenestration (band) =

UK nu metal band

- Origin: Kettering, Northamptonshire, United Kingdom
- Genre: Nu metal
- Years active: 1999–2004, 2024–present
- Members: Gen Tasker; Jamie Thompson; Rob Reeves; Scott Warner; Kieran Brain
- Past members: Stuart Bruce; Stacey Maher; Ben Gordelier

Defenestration are a UK nu metal band, based in Northamptonshire. The band were originally active between 1999 - 2004 and reunited in 2024.

== Career ==
In their short career Defenestration played over 300 shows across the UK and Europe, gigging & touring with the likes of Raging Speedhorn, Will Haven, Lostprophets, Napalm Death, Earthtone9, Stampin' Ground, Biffy Clyro, The Wildhearts, Alkaline Trio, Mendeed, Gutworm, Queenadreena, Zodiac Mindwarp and the Love Reaction, Skindred, Orange Goblin, Atomic Bitchwax, Spunge, Therapy? and Megadeth. Career highlights included the band's shows at the 2001 Reading and Leeds Festivals as well as opening the Wembley Arena leg of the 2001 'Tattoo The Planet Tour' whose line-up also boasted such acts as Cradle of Filth, Biohazard and Slayer.

Throughout 2001 the band's debut album 'One Inch God' received much attention and praise in the British music media with reviews and features appearing in magazines such as Kerrang!, Metal Hammer, Rock Sound, NME, Revolver and Q. As a result, the band were nominated in the 'Best New Band In Britain' category at the 2001 Kerrang! Awards, narrowly losing out to Lostprophets. The band received regular radio airtime, being played on XFM, Total Rock Radio, the Mary Anne Hobbs' BBC Radio 1 Rock Show and the John Peel show. Live sessions were recorded for BBC Radio 1 and London-based Total Rock Radio.

Defenestration received music TV coverage with their Stitch and Away or Dead music videos being rotated on MTV2 and Kerrang! TV. They were also the subject of an MTV2 Riot documentary that followed the band as they embarked on a short tour of schools and universities – the first Metal band to do so.

2002 saw the release of a split e.p with fellow Kettering sludge band Scurge, as well as a UK headline tour and support shows with Will Haven.

The band's second album, Ray Zero, was released on October 13, 2003 and supported by a UK tour, as well as dates in Malta, with Maltese metal band Slit.

Defenestration released their final recording 'For Us It Ends When We Drown', a 6 track 'mini-album' in 2004, before disbanding.

In the following years, Gen Tasker formed punk band Thracia with Liam Durrant of UKHC band Freebase. Jamie Thompson went on to join Raging Speedhorn and has played in various other bands including Scurge, Death of Us and Creation Myths. Robert Reeves went on to form Gunning For Goliath with Scott Warner, before releasing acoustic music and poetry as a solo artist. Following Gunning For Goliath, Scott Warner played in Lux with Stephen Rees from The Junket and ex-Defen drummer Ben Gordelier. He has played Bass in atmospheric Alt-Rock band Veins with Stephen Rees and former ACODA drummer Dan Appleyard since 2016. Kieran Brain joined Raging Speedhorn frontman Frank Reagan in forming Motorcity Daredevils but left after a couple of years to pursue his love of funk drumming.

In early 2024 it was announced that the band would reunite for their first live performance in 20 years. The gig, supporting Raging Speedhorn, was to raise money for record producer Russ Russell who was unable to work due to illness. The band, who originally pre-dated social media, created Instagram and Facebook accounts to promote the gig and document the band's history. The band organised their own benefit gig for Russ Russell at The Black Prince, Northampton on the 17th August 2024, their first headline show since 2004. This was followed by two further shows with Raging Speedhorn in November 2024 and shows in 2025 with Kill II This and Kid Bookie.

== Current Lineup ==
- Gen Tasker (vocals)
- Jamie Thompson (guitar)
- Robert Reeves (guitar)
- Scott Warner (bass)
- Kieran Brain (drums)

=== Former members ===
Former members include:

- Stuart Bruce (drums 1999–2000) who went on to front indie band Sympathy State.
- Stacey Maher AKA Stacey Chaos (drums 2000–2002) drummed for the punk rock band Black Skull Squadron.
- Ben Gordelier (drums 2002) who has since drummed for the Mercury Prize nominated Maps and is now in lux with Scott Warner as well as indie band The Moons with Paul Weller keyboard player Andy Crofts.

== Releases ==
The band's first two albums were released on Dreamcatcher Records (Spitfire Records in the US) Their split EP was released on Snapper Music and their final release, the mini album For Us It Ends When We Drown was released on Rising Records.

- One Inch God (2001)
- Year Of The Slug split EP with Scurge (2002)
- Ray Zero (2003)
- For Us it Ends When We Drown (2004)

One Inch God and Ray Zero were re-released across digital platforms in June 2020 via Secret Records Limited

== See also ==
- Defenestration
