= Start Something =

2004 studio album by Lostprophets

Studio album by Lostprophets
- Released: 2 February 2004
- Studios: Bigfoot Studios (Los Angeles); Bay 7 Studios (Calabasas)
- Genres: Nu metal; emo
- Length: 56:48 (United Kingdom); 52:43 (United States); 65:01 (Japan)
- Labels: Visible Noise; Columbia
- Producer: Eric Valentine

Lostprophets chronology
| The Fake Sound of Progress (2000) | Start Something (2004) | Liberation Transmission (2006) |

Singles from Start Something
- 1. "Burn Burn" Released: 3 November 2003; 2. "Last Train Home" Released: 27 December 2003; 3. "Wake Up (Make a Move)" Released: 3 May 2004; 4. "Last Summer" Released: 23 August 2004; 5. "I Don't Know" Released: 26 October 2004 (radio airplay); 6. "Goodbye Tonight" Released: 22 November 2004

Start Something is the second studio album by the Welsh rock band Lostprophets, released on 2 February 2004 through Visible Noise in the United Kingdom and South Korea. The album was released internationally on 5 February 2004 through Columbia. The band began work on the album in 2003 after touring for support of their previous album, The Fake Sound of Progress. This is the second and last album featuring the original drummer Mike Chiplin.

Start Something was both a critical and commercial success, quickly becoming the band's most successful album. It peaked at number 33 on the Billboard 200 in the United States, and was eventually certified Gold by the RIAA. Six singles were released from the album: "Burn Burn", "Last Train Home", "Wake Up (Make a Move)", "Last Summer", "Goodbye Tonight" and the radio single "I Don't Know". These singles helped Lostprophets reach mainstream popularity. The album would go on to be certified platinum by the BPI in the United Kingdom, and gold in the United States by the RIAA.

== Composition ==
The album was produced by Eric Valentine, who had also produced albums from Queens of the Stone Age and Good Charlotte. The band claimed they had settled on the title to introduce their abilities on a more grand musical level as compared to their actual debut The Fake Sound of Progress, as they considered it to be more of a reworked demo. According to lead singer Ian Watkins, the title was also influenced by several friends of the band they had claimed would "love to do this and that, but never had the drive to do it".

Prior to the beginning of the recording process, the band had befriended Hoobastank as the two bands shared a recording space in Calabasas, California. Watkins and Jamie Oliver recorded their guest appearance for the Hoobastank song "Out of Control" off of their 2003 album The Reason.

The band cancelled their scheduled performance at the 2003 Reading and Leeds Festival to continue work on the album. Watkins claimed the band sought to finish recording, claiming "We want to make the best record possible and did not want to rush anything, unfortunately these shows are at the final stages of making the record and we felt it was more important." The Scottish rock band Biffy Clyro replaced Lostprophets at the festival.

Billy Martin and Benji Madden of Good Charlotte record additional vocals on "Last Train Home".

The track listing varies depending on region, the track "We Are Godzilla, You Are Japan" was omitted from the North American version of the album, though versions with the track have the final two tracks "Sway" and "Outro" consolidated into one track.

The band included two additional tracks for the album's Japanese version; "Lucky You" and "Like a Fire". Despite not appearing as a track on any of the singles or on any version outside of the Japanese and original Australian release; "Lucky You" was submitted by the band for its inclusion in the Spider-Man 2 soundtrack, released on 30 June 2004 alongside the film. Original pressings of the Australian release had also included "Lucky You" as the penultimate track, but it was later removed in 2005. Other recording outtakes such as "The Politics of Emotion", "Holding On", "Our Broken Hearts", and "Push Out the Jive, Bring in the Love" were scrapped from the final track listing, though they appear on several singles.

=== Artwork ===
The album cover (designed by Watkins and Oliver) features a new gothic style logo with German blackletter typeface, replacing the old logo used for The Fake Sound of Progress. It would in itself be replaced for the band's next album, but featured on several of the band's singles taken from this album. Sometimes the lyrics "but even through your doubts, we will still be here", taken from "We Still Kill The Old Way", are written below the logo. The figure at the front of the artwork wears blue jeans, a black hoodie and a baseball cap and was jokingly thought to resemble Justin Timberlake in several humorous interviews with the band. However, the person actually depicted in the photograph was Watkins, as was later clarified by bassist Stuart Richardson in 2005.

At the time, Oliver was also an acclaimed artist with his work being displayed in several exhibitions depicting Rhondda life. There are slight variations with the cover in different territories with some editions showing the shadow of the figure with wings - either angels wings or more likely bird wings. This is best depicted in an official promotional wallpaper the band released for fans. The picture was shot on the 1st Street Bridge in Boyle Heights, directly east of Los Angeles, where the album was recorded and mixed. Watkins claimed he regarded artwork as "just as important as the music". During a January 2010 interview, Watkins further reflected back on Lostprophets' prior artwork claiming "I remember doing the Start Something record and compiling the inlay which is a collage of two years of our lives. It was so much fun. I'd sit there for hours looking at the booklet and all the little pictures. I did that to all the albums I bought."

=== Promotion ===
Songs from the new album were first performed live on 17 August 2003 at Newport, the first gig of three alongside a Birmingham date and a Manchester date, in preparation for the Reading and Leeds festival at the end of August. For these gigs, "We Still Kill the Old Way" became the regular opener, whilst sets closed with "Burn Burn", with tracks from their previous album interspersed in between. Kerrang noted in a live review from Manchester that "We Still Kill the Old Way" and "To Hell We Ride" were "well received" but that "the surfeit of new material leads to a comparatively muted response". At the end of July though it was announced that the band had cancelled their appearance at Reading and Leeds, whilst still promising to play the three warm-up shows, citing that they wanted the recording of Start Something to take precedence. Ian Watkins later announced "Unfortunately these shows are at the final stages of making the record and we felt it was more important not to short change anyone." The band did however support Linkin Park at Wembley Arena in London on 22 November 2003 performing eight songs, including five from the upcoming album. Despite the recording process, the band performed a total of four dates in 2003.

The song "To Hell We Ride" made an appearance in the video game Need for Speed: Underground, released in November 2003, as a bonus feature of the game, users could unlock a custom 1999 Nissan Skyline GT-R given a custom livery with the band's logo and artwork from the upcoming album as an easter egg.

== Commercial performance ==
=== Europe ===
The album was well received in the UK, being certified Silver and later Gold by the BPI on 20 February 2004, it would go on to be certified Platinum in the UK on 14 January 2005. The album debuted on the UK Albums Chart at #4 in 2004, in 2005 it reached its peak position #93 and after the release of Liberation Transmission in 2006 the album re-charted and peaked at #133. The album was also well received in Germany, entering the German album charts at #51. The album's lead single "Burn Burn" became the band's first charting song in Germany, peaking at #81. "Last Train Home" had proved to become a more successful single as it peaked #48. The album also managed to chart in Finland, Austria, Ireland, France, and the mainland Eurochart upon release; the latter peaking at #15.

=== North America ===
Upon release, the album was poorly received in Canada, only peaking at number 87 on the Canadian Albums Chart and yielding no charting singles aside from "Last Train Home", which peaked at #14 on the Canada Rock Top 30 chart on Radio & Records. Despite this; the album was positively received in the United States, being compared to American acts such as Linkin Park, Limp Bizkit, and Incubus. The album's first single, "Burn Burn", had initially failed to chart in the United States; but the album's second single "Last Train Home" quickly became a hit; prompting the album to sell 117,000 copies in its first week in America. "Last Train Home" had grown substantial attention in America in December 2003 through radio airplay regular MTV rotation. The single quickly became the band's highest-charting single in America, prompting the band members to appear as guests on Total Request Live on 13 March 2004. The single had also managed to beat fellow UK rock band The Darkness' hit single "I Believe in a Thing Called Love" (released in September 2003), charting twelve spots higher on Billboard's Mainstream Rock charts upon release in December 2003. The song became the highest-charting single of any UK rock act in the United States in 2003. In mid-February 2004, Start Something peaked at #33 on the Billboard 200 becoming the band's highest charting album in the United States to date. The album also reached #121 on the Billboard's Year-End Chart in the United States in December 2004. To date, it is the band's only release certified by the RIAA. On 3 June 2004, the album was certified Gold by the RIAA in the United States. Despite the strong response to the album's second single; "Wake Up (Make a Move)" was not as well received, though it also charted in America at #16, "I Don't Know", was also released as a radio-only single on 26 October 2004, it ultimately peaked at #11 on the Hot Modern Rock Tracks chart and #24 on the Hot Mainstream Rock Tracks chart.

=== Australia/New Zealand ===
Despite entering the New Zealand album charts at #14, Start Something did not yield any charting singles in the country. Australia had a similarly mixed reception for the album's release as only "Burn Burn" and "Last Train Home" charted as singles respectively. Regardless; Burn Burn had managed to become a minor hit in Australia, peaking at #48 in December 2003.

==== Streaming ====
In May 2012 the album had still garnered 10.8 million plays by 640,000 listeners on Last.FM. As of May 2023, the album is still the band's most popular record following their breakup in 2013. Spotify reported that "Start Something" still receives over 60,000 monthly plays from users in the UK.

Despite Watkins' conviction in 2012; the album remains purchasable internationally on Apple Music. Spotify also has the album available for play only for users in the United Kingdom and Japan. Much of the band's Visible Noise catalogue was not renewed for licensing to be streamed in markets such as North America, Australia, or South Korea after 2012.

== Critical reception ==
Professional ratings
Aggregate scores
| Source | Rating |
|---|---|
| Metacritic | 70/100 |
Review scores
| Source | Rating |
| AllMusic | 2/5 stars |
| Drowned in Sound | 8/10 |
| entertainment.ie | 4/5 stars |
| Entertainment Weekly | B |
| IGN | 7.1/10 |
| Kerrang! | 5/5 stars |
| Melodic | 4.5/5 stars |
| NME | 8/10 |
| Rolling Stone | 3/5 stars |
| Sputnikmusic | 3.5/5 |

The album received mostly positive reviews from music critics. At Metacritic, which assigns a normalized rating out of 100 to reviews from mainstream critics, the album has received an average score of 70, based on 13 reviews.

Johnny Loftus from AllMusic gave the album a negative review, claiming that they had too big of a resemblance to American bands such as Faith No More, Incubus and Hoobastank; Loftus gave the album 2 out of 5 stars. He noted a more melodic singing style on the album when compared to The Fake Sound of Progress, commenting that "the Mike Patton scream Prophets vocalist Ian Watkins perfected on 2001's Fake Sound of Progress has — like it did for Brandon Boyd and Doug Robb — mellowed into a blandly earnest yawp capable of keeping things thick enough for the dudes but still rife with those heartfelt intakes of breath that the ladies love." In his July 2004 review, Jason MacNeil of PopMatters also considered the album to be derivative of American bands, labelling the track "I Don't Know" as "Incubus-by-numbers", adding that on the title track "Faith No More is also brought back from the dead as the piano tinkling surpasses the guitars."

Rolling Stone reviewer Kirk Miller was more positive to the album and called it a "kick-ass tribute" because of its resemblance to Faith No More, and gave the album 3 out of 5 stars. Justin Kownacki from Splendid said "this is one of those finely-polished discs that should have no trouble finding a huge audience" and was more over positive to the album.

Drowned in Sound reviewer Gen Williams said "It's a really really really really really REALLY great pop-metal explosion." and continued to say "Burn Burn" boasted "the catchiest hook this side of Linkin Park" and that the alleged Adamski rip-off was justified because of the song's quality, and giving the album 8 out of 10 stars.

Q called it "Unashamedly Epic." NME said "This is something genuinely fresh... here friends, is the real sound of progress (reference to the band's previous effort, The Fake Sound of Progress)" and Observer Music Monthly credited Start Something on being "A hybrid of big rock choruses, powerful rhythms and a neat pop edge to their rock artillery." Entertainment Weekly gave the album a B and said that Lostprophets "mostly live up to that high standard by juxtaposing gnarly metal riffs with quirky electronic interludes. Only the occasional lapse into Linkin Park-style self-indulgence drags them down."

It was ranked seventh in Kerrang! magazine's Albums of the Year 2004 list. In a readers poll titled Top 100 British Rock Albums the album was ranked eighteenth, and was the third highest of the 2000s, however the poll was taken in February 2005 whilst the album was still fresh in the mind for many.

In 2005, Start Something was ranked number 364 in Rock Hard magazine's book The 500 Greatest Rock & Metal Albums of All Time. Rock Sound magazine ranked the album eighth on their Critics' Poll 2004, the highest placing for a British band.

== Tour ==
To promote the album, the band toured North America, Europe, Asia and Oceania. Four months before the release of Start Something the band embarked on a tour in support. The tour began in the United Kingdom. The band also announced dates, opening for Linkin Park on their UK arena tour for select dates in October 2003. The band also announced performances at the NME Award show at the London Astoria and later announced further UK dates in Glasgow, Newcastle and Manchester among others. The concert in the London Astoria ended up being sold out.

The band took part in the second European leg of Metallica's Madly in Anger with the World Tour alongside Slipknot and Godsmack. Lostprophets were billed as the opening act for European dates stretching from 26 May, to 4 July 2004. Though their own touring commitments forced them to drop from the tour with Metallica prior to the second North American leg in August as they were also obligated to perform in the United States later that month.

The North American leg of the tour began on 19 March 2004, lasting until 18 December. Lostprophets would also take part of MTV's Campus Invasion Tour, in support for headliners Hoobastank, beginning at the University of Tennessee at Chattanooga in Chattanooga, Tennessee. In May 2004 the band performed in Vancouver, British Columbia, Canada for a one night show. The band announced further dates in New Zealand and Australia as a part of the Big Day Out festival, and dates in Asia were later announced, marking the band's first performance in Japan. The band returned to the UK in November 2004 as their own headliners, and capped off their tour with 10 additional American dates, ultimately ending the tour in Cleveland, Ohio on 18 December 2004.

Prior to 2013, Start Something was still the band's most popular album with just over 35% of songs coming from that album across all their performances from 2004 to 2012. During the band's 2012 tour in support of their album Weapons, the band announced a homecoming show at Cardiff's Motorpoint Arena where the album was played in its entirety. Stuart Richardson said "We wrote the record in Caerphilly. Start Something is when we kind of came into our own as a band, and Cardiff is where we came into our own as people". The performance sold out with a crowd of 10,000 people.

=== Tour dates ===
| Date | City | Country | Venue |
'03-'04 Meteora World Tour (UK Leg In Support of Linkin Park)
| 10 October 2003 | Birmingham | United Kingdom | Birmingham Arena |
| 28 October 2003 | Glasgow | United Kingdom | The Garage |
| 29 October 2003 | Birmingham | United Kingdom | O2 Academy Birmingham |
| 20 November 2003 | Glasgow | United Kingdom | SECC Centre |
| 21 November 2003 | Manchester | United Kingdom | Manchester Arena |
| 22 November 2003 | London | United Kingdom | OVO Wembley Arena |
| 24 November 2003 | Birmingham | United Kingdom | O2 Academy Birmingham |
| 25 November 2003 | Cardiff | United Kingdom | Cardiff International Arena |

| Date | City | Country | Venue |
Start Something World Tour (Leg I)
| 16 January 2004 | Auckland | New Zealand | Big Day Out '04 |
| 18 January 2004 | Gold Coast, Queensland | Australia | Big Day Out '04 |
| 23 January 2004 | Gold Coast, Queensland | Australia | Big Day Out '04 |
| 26 January 2004 | Melbourne | Australia | Big Day Out '04 |
| 30 January 2004 | Adelaide | Australia | Big Day Out '04 |
| 3 February 2004 | New York City | United States | Irving Plaza |
| 7 February 2004 | Glasgow | United Kingdom | Queen Margaret Union |
| 8 February 2004 | Newcastle upon Tyne | United Kingdom | Newcastle University |
| 9 February 2004 | London | United Kingdom | Astoria |
| 10 February 2004 | Glasgow | United Kingdom | Queen Margaret Union |
| 11 February 2004 | Norwich | United Kingdom | University of East Anglia |
| 12 February 2004 | Birmingham | United Kingdom | Carling Academy |
| 13 February 2004 | Portsmouth | United Kingdom | Pyramids Centre |
| 15 February 2004 | Leeds | United Kingdom | Leeds Metropolitan University |
| 16 February 2004 | Manchester | United Kingdom | University of Manchester |
| 17 February 2004 | Nottingham | United Kingdom | Rock City |
| 19 February 2004 | Liverpool | United Kingdom | O2 Arena Liverpool |
| 20 February 2004 | Cardiff | United Kingdom | Great Hall Cardiff |
| 22 February 2004 | Brixton | United Kingdom | Brixton Academy |
| 8 March 2004 | Amsterdam | The Netherlands | The Max, Melkweg |

| Date | City | Country | Venue |
MTV Campus Invasion Tour
| 19 March 2004 | Chattanooga, Tennessee | United States | University of Tennessee at Chattanooga |
| 26 March 2004 | Ashland, Ohio | United States | Ashland University |
| 29 March 2004 | Alfred, New York | United States | Alfred University |
| 31 March 2004 | Blacksburg, Virginia | United States | Virginia Tech |
| 2 April 2004 | Jackson, Mississippi | United States | University of Mississippi |
| 6 April 2004 | Miami, Florida | United States | Florida International University |
| 7 April 2004 | Orlando, Florida | United States | University of Central Florida |
| 8 April 2004 | Fort Myers, Florida | United States | Florida Gulf Coast University |
| 15 April 2004 | San Angelo, Texas | United States | Angelo State University |
| 22 April 2004 | DeKalb, Illinois | United States | Northern University |
| 23 April 2004 | Buffalo, New York | United States | University at Buffalo |
| 24 April 2004 | Norfolk, Virginia | United States | Old Dominion University |

| Date | City | Country | Venue |
Madly in Anger with the World Tour (European supporting act for Metallica)
| 26 May 2004 | Copenhagen | Denmark | Parken Stadium |
| 28 May 2004 | Helsinki | Finland | Helsinki Olympic Stadium |
| 30 May 2004 | Gothenburg | Sweden | Ullevi |
| 31 May 2004 | Chorzów | Poland | Silesian Stadium |
| 2 June 2004 | Glasgow | Scotland | Glasgow Green |
| 4 June 2004 | Nürburg | Germany | Rock Am Ring |
| 6 June 2004 | Castle Donington | England | Donington Park |
| 8 June 2004 | Ludwigshafen | Germany | Südweststadion |
| 10 June 2004 | Gelsenkirchen | Germany | Arena AufSchalke |
| 11 June 2004 | Vienna | Austria | Flugfeld Civitas Nova |
| 13 June 2004 | Munich | Germany | Olympiastadion |
| 15 June 2004 | Belgrade | Serbia and Montenegro | Partizan Stadium |
| 16 June 2004 | Bremen | Germany | Weser-Stadion |
| 18 June 2004 | Zürich | Switzerland | Letzigrund |
| 19 June 2004 | Zaragoza | Spain | La Romareda |
| 21 June 2004 | Amsterdam | Netherlands | Amsterdam Arena |
| 23 June 2004 | Paris | France | Parc des Princes |
| 25 June 2004 | Dublin | Ireland | RDS Arena |
| 29 June 2004 | Padua | Italy | Stadio Euganeo |
| 1 July 2004 | Prague | Czech Republic | T-Mobile Park Kolbenova |
| 2 July 2004 | Werchter | Belgium | Rock Werchter |

| Date | City | Country | Venue |
Start Something World Tour (Leg II)
| 15 July 2004 | Washington D.C. | United States | 9:30 Club |
| 16 July 2004 | Philadelphia, Pennsylvania | United States | Trocadero Theatre |
| 17 July 2004 | Charlotte, North Carolina | United States | Tremont Music Hall |
| 21 July 2004 | Orlando, Florida | United States | Hard Rock Live Orlando |
| 25 July 2004 | Cleveland, Ohio | United States | The Odeon |
| 27 July 2004 | Pittsburgh, Pennsylvania | United States | Rock Club |
| 28 July 2004 | Pontiac, Michigan | United States | Clutch Cargo's |
| 31 July 2004 | Minneapolis, Minnesota | United States | The Quest Club |
| 3 August 2004 | St. Louis, Missouri | United States | Mississippi Nights |
| 8 August 2004 | Tokyo | Japan | Summer Sonic 2004 |
| 13 August 2004 | Boston, Massachusetts | United States | The Axis |
| 14 August 2004 | Sayreville, New Jersey | United States | Starland Ballroom |
| 27 August 2004 | Wetherby | United Kingdom | Reading Festival 2004 |
| 29 August 2004 | Leeds | United Kingdom | Leeds Festival |
| 19 September 2004 | Birmingham | United Kingdom | BBC Radio 1 Big Weekend |
| 22 September 2004 | Grand Prairie, Texas | United States | Texas Trust CU Theatre at Grand Prairie |
| 24 September 2004 | Denver, Colorado | United States | The Filmore |
| 25 September 2004 | Salt Lake City, Utah | United States | X96 Big Ass Show |
| 26 September 2004 | Las Vegas, Nevada | United States | House of Blues Las Vegas at Mandalay Bay |
| 28 September 2004 | Anaheim, California | United States | City National Grove of Anaheim |
| 2 October 2004 | Tucson, Arizona | United States | Tucson Electric Park |
| 3 October 2004 | Los Angeles, California | United States | The Wiltern |
| 4 October 2004 | Davis, California | United States | Freeborn Hall, UC Davis |
| 5 October 2004 | San Francisco, California | United States | The Warfield Theatre |
| 9 October 2004 | Portland, Oregon | United States | Roseland Theater |
| 13 October 2004 | Kansas City, Missouri | United States | Uptown Theater |
| 14 October 2004 | Minneapolis, Minnesota | United States | Quest Club |
| 15 October 2004 | Milwaukee, Wisconsin | United States | The Eagles Club |
| 16 October 2004 | Chicago, Illinois | United States | Congress Theater |
| 19 October 2004 | Toronto | Canada | Kool Haus |
| 21 October 2004 | Detroit, Michigan | United States | The Fillmore Detroit |
| 22 October 2004 | Cleveland, Ohio | United States | Agora Ballroom |
| 23 October 2004 | Belle Vernon, Pennsylvania | United States | Ice Garden Arena |
| 24 October 2004 | Philadelphia, Pennsylvania | United States | Franklin Music Hall |
| 26 October 2004 | New York City | United States | Roseland Ballroom |
| 27 October 2004 | Boston, Massachusetts | United States | Avalon |
| 1 November 2004 | Nashville, Tennessee | United States | Rockettown |
| 13 November 2004 | Glasgow | United Kingdom | SECC Glasgow Hall 4 |
| 14 November 2004 | Newcastle upon Tyne | United Kingdom | Northumbria University |
| 20 November 2004 | Manchester | United Kingdom | O2 Apollo Manchester |
| 21 November 2004 | Cardiff | United Kingdom | Cardiff International Arena |
| 23 November 2004 | Leeds | United Kingdom | The Reflectory |
| 24 November 2004 | Wolverhampton | United Kingdom | Civic Arena |
| 28 November 2004 | Belfast | United Kingdom | Ulster Hall |
| 30 November 2004 | Bridgeport, Connecticut | United States | MJ Nesheiwat Convention Center |
| 4 December 2004 | West Palm Beach, Florida | United States | Buzz Bake Sale 04 |
| 5 December 2004 | Clearwater, Florida | United States | Coachman Park |
| 7 December 2004 | Lake Buena Vista, Florida | United States | House of Blues Buena Vista |
| 8 December 2004 | Pensacola, Florida | United States | Pensacola Bay Center |
| 9 December 2004 | New Orleans, Louisiana | United States | House of Blues New Orleans |
| 12 December 2004 | Dallas, Texas | United States | 2513 Deep Ellum |
| 16 December 2004 | St. Louis, Missouri | United States | The Pageant |
| 17 December 2004 | Cincinnati, Ohio | United States | Bogart's |
| 18 December 2004 | Cleveland, Ohio | United States | House of Blues Cleveland |

== Legacy ==
In June 2012 the album was entered into Rock Sound magazine's Hall of Fame with features on how the band look back on the album and how it has influenced others. Rock Sound said that the album made the band into "one of our greatest rock commodities" and called it a "defining record for the UK rock scene as a whole". Lee Gaze stated "Start Something is the greatest hits of what Lostprophets do". Aled Phillips of Kids in Glass Houses said "it was a turning point for a lot of bands" but also that "everyone's jeans got tighter and started wearing Nike Dunks - it was a cultural shift. With them it was never just about the music, everybody got swept up in the whole aesthetic as well". Five British rock records - All Our Kings Are Dead, We Are the Dynamite, World Record, Free and Hold Me Down - were all cited as being heavily influenced by Start Something.

BBC Wales called the album a "modern rock classic" in retrospect and BBC Music called it a "UK rock classic". Whilst WalesOnline noted how the album had been "a galvanising force in the Welsh rock scene". The BBC also produced a radio programme with Bethan Elfyn that aired on BBC Radio 1 in May 2010, which featured the Stereophonics, Manic Street Preachers, Funeral for a Friend and The Blackout amongst others, and titled it "Start Something: The Story of South Wales Rock" in honour of the album. The album was included in Rock Sound's 101 Modern Classics list at number 14.

As of 2008, the album had sold 2.5 million copies worldwide; according to the British Broadcasting Corporation (BBC).

=== Awards ===
Kerrang! Awards

| Year | Nominee / work | Award | Result |
|---|---|---|---|
| 2004 | Start Something | Best Album | Nominated |
| 2004 | Last Train Home | Best Single | Won |

Metal Hammer Awards

| Year | Nominee / work | Award | Result |
|---|---|---|---|
| 2004 | Lostprophets for Start Something tour | Best Live Act | Nominated |

=== Accolades ===
| Publication | Accolade | Recording | Year | Rank |
|---|---|---|---|---|
| Kerrang! | Albums of the Year | - | 2004 | 7th |
| Kerrang! | 666 Songs You Must Own | Burn Burn & Last Train Home | 2005 | * |
| Kerrang! | The Rock 100 | Last Train Home | 2012 | * |
| Kerrang! | The 50 Best Albums of the 21st Century | - | 2009 | 19th |
| Rock Sound | Critic' Poll | - | 2004 | 8th |
| Metal Hammer | Albums of 2004 | - | 2004 | 10th |
| Q | Recordings of the Year | - | 2004 | 32nd |
| Q | Readers Best Tracks of the Year | Last Summer | 2004 | 82nd |
| Q | Ultimate Music Collection | Burn Burn | 2005 | * |
| Classic Rock | End of Year Best Albums | - | 2004 | 13th |
| Rock Sound | Hall of Fame Records | - | 2012 | * |

(*) designates unordered lists.

== Track listing ==
All lyrics written by Ian Watkins, all music composed by Lostprophets.

International edition
| No. | Title | Length |
|---|---|---|
| 1. | "We Still Kill the Old Way" | 4:21 |
| 2. | "To Hell We Ride" | 3:40 |
| 3. | "Last Train Home" | 4:35 |
| 4. | "Make a Move" | 3:56 |
| 5. | "Burn Burn" | 3:36 |
| 6. | "I Don't Know" | 3:57 |
| 7. | "Hello Again" | 4:57 |
| 8. | "Goodbye Tonight" | 3:54 |
| 9. | "Start Something" | 3:26 |
| 10. | "A Million Miles" | 4:24 |
| 11. | "Last Summer" | 4:07 |
| 12. | "We Are Godzilla, You Are Japan" | 4:05 |
| 13. | "Sway...." | 10:32 |
| Total length: | | 56:48 |

Japanese edition bonus tracks
| No. | Title | Length |
|---|---|---|
| 14. | "Lucky You" | 4:33 |
| 15. | "Like a Fire" | 4:02 |
| Total length: | | 65:01 |

Japanese limited edition bonus DVD
| No. | Title | Length |
|---|---|---|
| 1. | "Burn Burn" (music video) | 3:31 |
| 2. | "Shinobi vs. Dragon Ninja" (music video) | 3:01 |
| Total length: | | 6:32 |

US edition
| No. | Title | Length |
|---|---|---|
| 1. | "We Still Kill the Old Way" | 4:21 |
| 2. | "To Hell We Ride" | 3:40 |
| 3. | "Last Train Home" | 4:35 |
| 4. | "Wake Up (Make a Move)" | 3:56 |
| 5. | "Burn, Burn" | 3:36 |
| 6. | "I Don't Know" | 3:57 |
| 7. | "Hello Again" | 4:57 |
| 8. | "Goodbye Tonight" | 3:54 |
| 9. | "Start Something" | 3:26 |
| 10. | "A Million Miles" | 4:24 |
| 11. | "Last Summer" | 4:07 |
| 12. | "Sway" | 4:25 |
| 13. | "Outro" | 6:06 |
| Total length: | | 52:43 |

== Personnel ==
Credits for Start Something adapted from liner notes.

Lostprophets

- Ian Watkins – lead vocals, art direction
- Lee Gaze – lead guitar
- Mike Lewis – rhythm guitar
- Stu Richardson – bass guitar
- Jamie Oliver – vocals, synth, turntables, samples, illustration
- Mike Chiplin – drums, percussion

Additional musicians

- David Campbell – string arrangement
- Billy Martin – backing vocals
- Benji Madden – backing vocals
- Brett Allen Rentals – additional guitars

Production

- Eric Valentine – production, engineered, mixing
- Kevin Augunas – engineered, backing vocals
- Joe Barresi – additional engineered
- Trevor Whatever – studio manager
- Steve Turzo – studio assistant, backing vocals
- Jeff Turzo – sequence
- DMT rentals – additional digital recording
- Brian Gardner – mastered
- Q Prime Inc. – management
- Doug Mark – legal
- Mike Dewdney – booking
- Julie Weir – Visible Noise A&R
- Greg Boggs – Columbia A&R
- Gerard Babitts – Columbia A&R
- Martin Greene Ravden – business management
- Mark "Flood" Ellis – business management
- Bumstead – business management
- McCready – business management
- McCarthy – business management
- Dan Mandell – art direction
- Chapman Baehler – photography
- Lawrence Watson – photography

== Charts ==
| Chart | Position |
|---|---|
| Australian Albums Chart | 66 |
| Austrian Albums Charts | 60 |
| Canadian Albums (Billboard) | 87 |
| European Top 100 Albums | 15 |
| Finnish Albums Chart | 46 |
| French Albums Charts | 69 |
| German Albums Chart | 51 |
| Irish Album Charts | 61 |
| Japanese Albums Chart | 34 |
| New Zealand Album Charts | 14 |
| UK Album Charts | 4 |
| US Billboard 200 | 33 |
| US Billboard Comprehensive Albums | 33 |

== Certifications ==
| Region | Certification | Certified units/sales |
|---|---|---|
| United Kingdom (BPI) | Platinum | 300,000^{^} |
| United States (RIAA) | Gold | 500,000^{^} |
^{^} Shipments figures based on certification alone.
