= Lostprophets =

Welsh rock band (1997–2013)

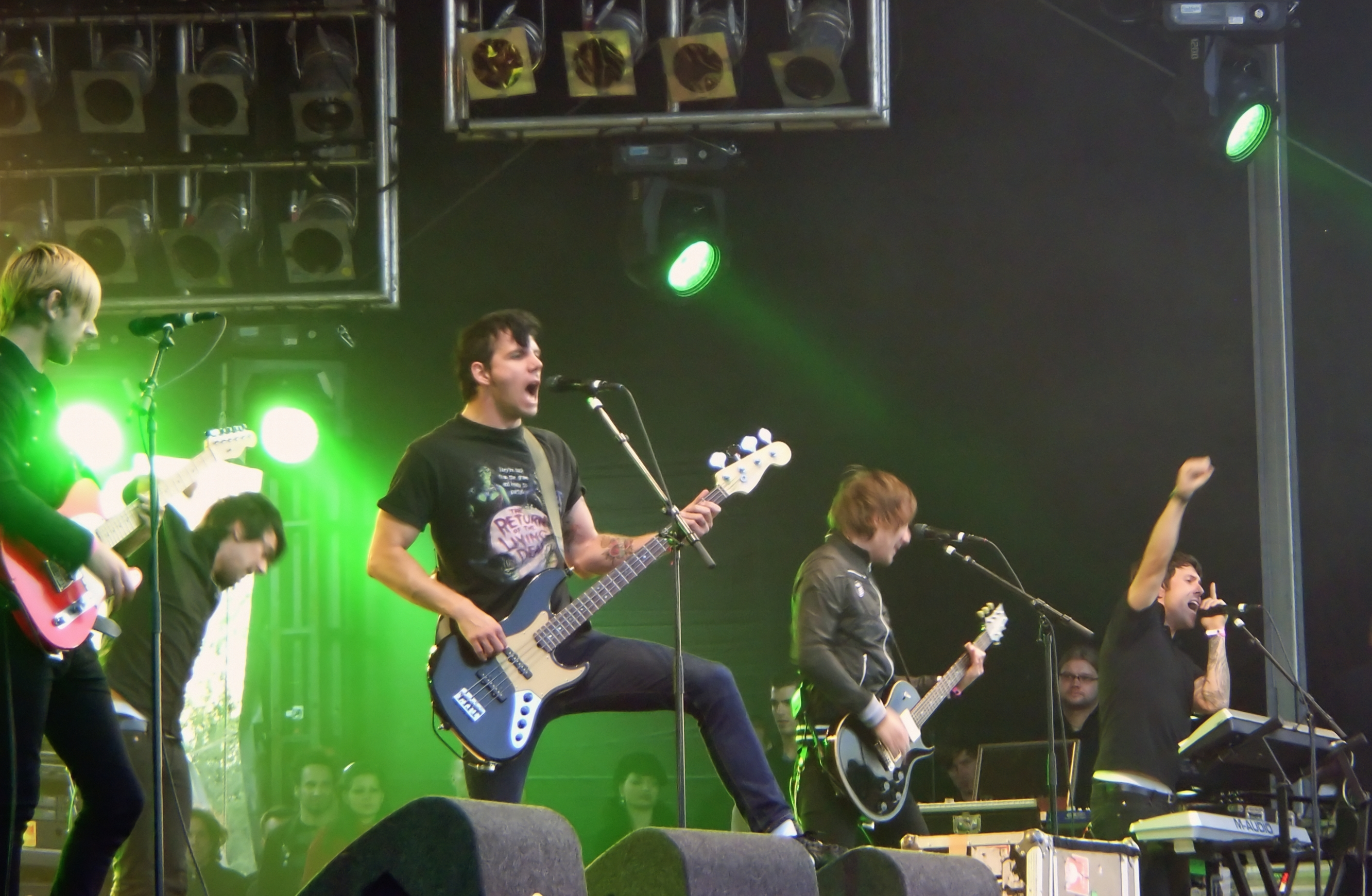
- Lostprophets performing in 2007

Background information
- Also known as: Lozt Prophetz (1997–1999)
- Origin: Pontypridd, Wales
- Genres: Alternative rock; post-hardcore; emo; nu metal
- Years active: 1997–2013
- Labels: Epic; Fearless; Sony; Columbia; Visible Noise
- Spinoffs: No Devotion
- Spinoff of: Aftermath; Public Disturbance; Fleshbind
- Past members: Ian Watkins; Lee Gaze; Mike Chiplin; Mike Lewis; Stu Richardson; DJ Stepzak; Jamie Oliver; Ilan Rubin; Luke Johnson
- Website: Official website (Archived - 21 October 2012)

Lostprophets were a Welsh rock band from Pontypridd, formed in 1997 by singer Ian Watkins and guitarist Lee Gaze. The group was founded after their former band Fleshbind broke up. They later recruited Mike Chiplin on drums, Mike Lewis as rhythm guitarist, Stu Richardson on bass guitar and Jamie Oliver on turntables and keyboards. Chiplin left the band in 2005, and was replaced by Ilan Rubin between 2006 and 2009, and Luke Johnson thereafter.

Lostprophets released five studio albums: The Fake Sound of Progress (2000), Start Something (2004), Liberation Transmission (2006), The Betrayed (2010), and Weapons (2012). They sold between 3.5 million - 4 million albums worldwide, achieving two top-ten singles on the UK singles chart ("Last Train Home" and "Rooftops"), a No. 1 single on both the UK Indie Singles and US Alternative Songs charts ("Last Train Home"), and several Kerrang! Awards and nominations.

In December 2012, Watkins was charged with multiple child sexual offences. Lostprophets cancelled all tour dates and disbanded in October 2013, before the end of Watkins' trial. Watkins pleaded guilty to several charges in November 2013, and was sentenced in December to 29 years of imprisonment plus six years of extended supervision on licence. In June 2014, the remaining members joined American singer Geoff Rickly (then-formerly of Thursday) to form a new band, No Devotion. Watkins was killed in prison in October 2025.

== History ==
=== Early years (1997–2000) ===
Lostprophets was formed by Ian Watkins and Lee Gaze in 1997 in Pontypridd, Wales, after their previous band Fleshbind disbanded. They could not find a singer, so Watkins decided he would switch from drums to be the frontman and they recruited Mike Chiplin on drums. Mike Lewis joined a few months later as bassist. Both Lewis and Watkins were also in the metalcore band Public Disturbance, until 1998 and 2000 respectively.

Lostprophets started out as part of the fledgling South Wales scene—playing gigs at venues across Wales including T.J.'s in Newport. From there, they went on to tour the UK circuit. The band recorded three demos during this time: Here comes the Party, Para Todas las Putas Celosas, which translates from Spanish as "For all the jealous whores", and The Fake Sound of Progress. These were produced by Stuart Richardson, who joined the band as bassist for the latter recording. Mike Lewis at this point switched to rhythm guitar. The Fake Sound of Progress also included the addition of DJ Stepzak, who would remain with the band for around a year.

The band caught the attention of the two music publishers Kerrang! and Metal Hammer magazines, receiving glancing reviews from both. In 1999, they signed in with Independent label Visible Noise.

=== The Fake Sound of Progress (2000–2002) ===
The band's debut album The Fake Sound of Progress was released through Visible Noise in November. Recorded in less than two weeks for £4,000 the record drew on a wide range of influences. It would be re-released the following year through Columbia Records. Shortly after the completion of the album, DJ Stepzak decided he would not commit to the band and was replaced with musician Jamie Oliver, who was originally the band's photographer, but was told by the band's management that someone who was not part of the band or crew members could not join them on tour, so Oliver bought a set of turntables and quickly became the band's DJ.

The band worked with producer Michael Barbiero to remaster the album in preparation for its release to American markets, and this new remastered version of the album was released in late 2001.

During this period, Lostprophets built up a strong live following with support slots to popular acts such as Pitchshifter, Linkin Park and Deftones, as well as several headlining stints of their own. They also took part in the successful Nu-Titans tour with Defenestration among other new UK metal acts of the time. Co-headlining the 2002 Deconstruction Tour in London, supporting acts included Mighty Mighty Bosstones and the Mad Caddies. Lostprophets featured on a bill consisting of more traditionally punk oriented acts. This provoked hostility from certain members of the audience, who were upset at Lostprophets inclusion on such a bill. The band subsequently toured with Ozzfest, played at Glastonbury and the Reading and Leeds Festival. They also appeared on a number of TV shows, including Top of the Pops, CD:UK and Never Mind the Buzzcocks. They also performed as part of the 2002 NME Carling Awards tour.

The Fake Sound of Progress has achieved Platinum status in the UK.

=== Start Something (2003–2004) ===
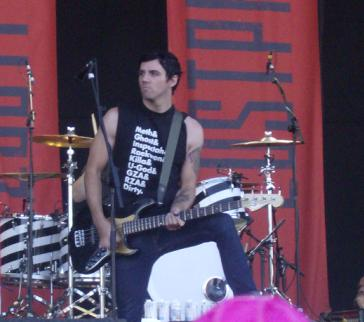
Stu Richardson performing with Lostprophets at Leeds Festival 2007

After the extensive touring cycle for The Fake Sound of Progress finally ended, the band took a brief break before beginning the process of writing new material for Start Something at Frontline Studios in Caerphilly, Wales. They then entered Los Angeles's Barefoot Studio for a recording process that lasted from March until September 2003, with producer Eric Valentine. Valentine had previously produced albums for Queens of the Stone Age and Good Charlotte.

The first single released from the album was the song "Burn Burn", the music video for which began receiving heavy rotation on satellite and cable channels like MTV2, Kerrang! TV and Scuzz in the UK. The song attracted some criticism, however, as the opening bore a striking resemblance to "Mother Mary", a song from the band Far's Water and Solutions album. The band themselves even conceded in interviews that the singing pattern bore an undeniable similarity to the Adamski song "Killer".

"Burn Burn" was released on 3 November 2003, and was originally scheduled to be closely followed by the release of the album. The release of the album was delayed several times and a headlining tour of the UK, was also postponed during this time. The band rescheduled the cancelled UK shows, with the exception of their scheduled appearance at the Reading and Leeds Festivals, stating in magazine interviews that honouring those commitments would have meant leaving the recording studio while the album was only half completed.

The album's second single "Last Train Home" was released on 27 December 2003, and quickly became a smash hit worldwide. The single became the band's second single to chart in the United States, beating out other UK rock band The Darkness' single "I Believe in a Thing Called Love" (released in November 2003), charting twelve spots higher on Billboard's Mainstream Rock charts upon release in December 2003. "Last Train Home" became the highest-charting single in the United States from any UK artist released in 2003. The song further gained much popularity in the United States through radio airplay and the music video saw regular rotation on MTV, generating much anticipation for the album in America.

The album was released in the UK on 2 February 2004, and was commercially successful, achieving number four in the UK Albums Chart and selling over 415,000 copies. The album has sold over 687,000 copies in the US alone according to Nielsen Soundscan although in a 2012 interview with Gigwise Lee Gaze stated it had sold 890,000 copies in the US. Worldwide the album has sold 2.5 million copies according to BBC Wales. The critical response from mainstream magazines was mostly positive, though the response from rock publications such as Kerrang!, Metal Hammer and Rock Sound was sometimes tepid. To promote the album, they toured North America, Europe and as part of the Big Day Out festival in Australia and New Zealand. The tour for this record culminated on 21 November 2004, at a sold-out show in Cardiff International Arena.

=== Liberation Transmission (2005–2007) ===
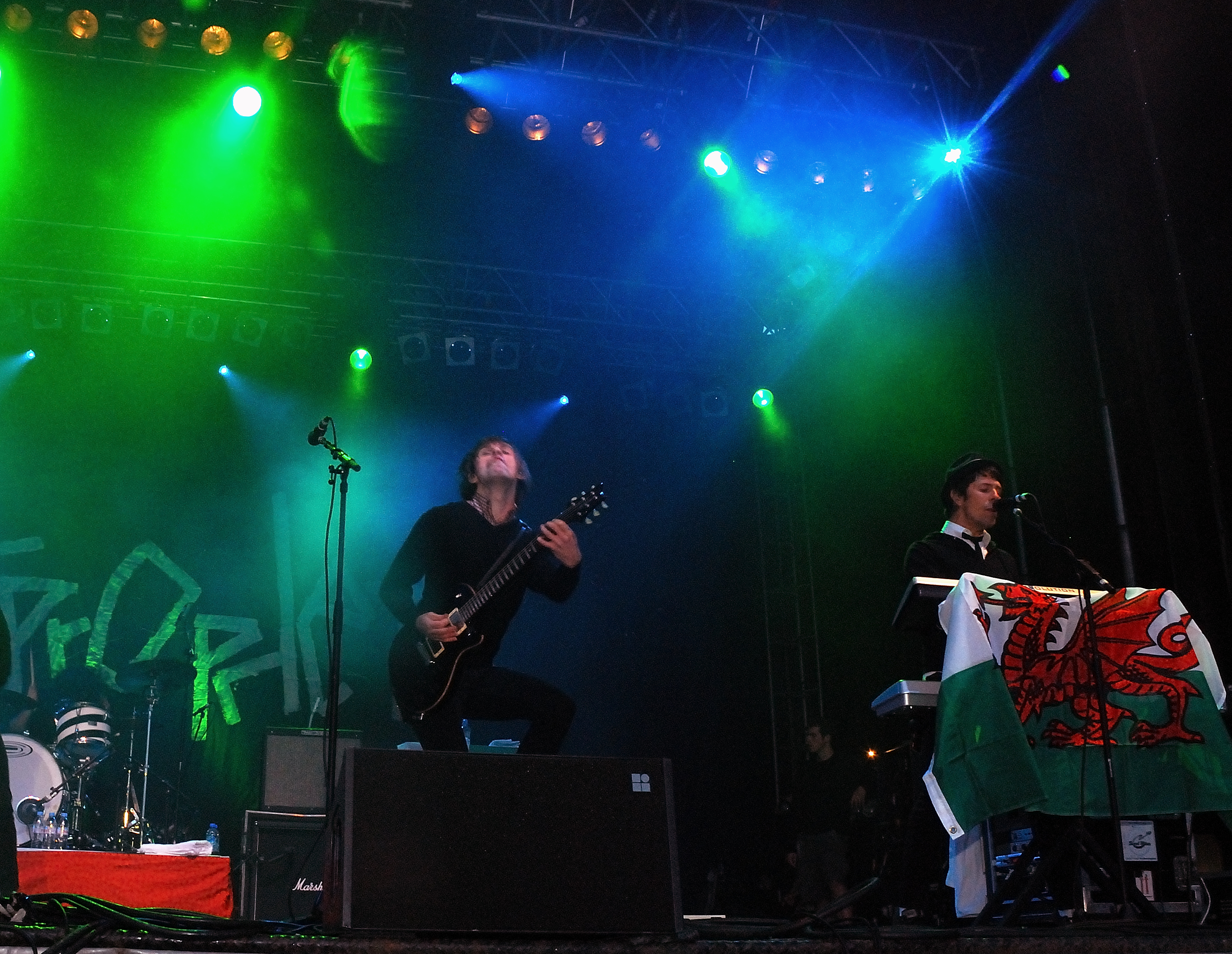
Mike Lewis (left) and Jamie Oliver performing with the band in 2007

On 19 June 2005, founding member Mike Chiplin left the group to pursue other musical opportunities. Since then, he joined another band called The Unsung, and played with Accident Music until their split in 2011, which also featured Chris Morgan of Midasuno and former Funeral for a Friend guitarist Darran Smith. He has also opened up his own practice-studio for young people to start bands.

The remaining members began working on material for the next album. Due to the lengthy gap between The Fake Sound of Progress and Start Something, and the backlash that grew against the band because of it, the remaining band members stated in various interviews that they wanted to release their third album in early 2006. As with Start Something, the band wrote and recorded demo tracks for the album (with Ian Watkins playing the drums) in a UK recording studio before completing the album in America. Liberation Transmission was recorded in Hawaii, and saw the band work with Bob Rock. Drummer Josh Freese (of the Vandals and A Perfect Circle) recorded ten out of the twelve drum tracks for this album (Ilan Rubin recorded "Everybody's Screaming!!!" and "For All These Times Son, for All These Times").

The band returned to their roots, playing a series of small venues across South Wales. They also headlined Give It a Name, a two-day event with My Chemical Romance. These shows featured the first live appearance of then-17-year-old Ilan Rubin on drums and the live premiere of songs "Rooftops (A Liberation Broadcast)", "A Town Called Hypocrisy" and "The New Transmission". The album itself was released on 26 June 2006 (27 June in the US), and became the first Lostprophets album to reach number one on the UK Albums Chart.

Lostprophets began a full-fledged UK tour on 3 July 2006. As with their warm-up gigs prior to the album's release, the band selected South Wales-based support bands for this tour. The band followed this with another UK tour in November, and then followed their UK dates with a European tour in France, Germany, and several other countries. The main support for this was the Blackout. They returned to the UK for an Arena tour in April 2007, from 18 April to 22nd. The scheduled venues were: Glasgow (SECC); Manchester (MEN Arena); Birmingham (NIA) & London (Wembley Arena). Lostprophets also played at the Full Ponty festival in Wales on 26 May 2007. The support acts included Paramore and the Blackout. The album has sold over 625,000 copies worldwide.

=== The Betrayed (2007–2010) ===
Writing and recording the band's fourth studio album began in early 2007. Originally the band stated that they wanted the album released in 2007; however, due to both touring and being unhappy with the results of their work in the studio, the band did not keep to their original release plan. Despite recording an entire album's worth of material with producer John Feldmann, this work was shelved in favour of material they later recorded and produced themselves, with recording sessions for what would later be known as The Betrayed beginning in November 2008.

Throughout the earlier part of 2008, the band performed several dates, including Download Festival which they headlined on the Sunday night, V Festival and Rock am Ring and Rock im Park, as well as a small number of performances around the UK. They also headlined the NME/Radio 1 tent at 2009's Reading and Leeds Festival.

The band claimed that The Betrayed is "by far the finest, darkest and most real album" of their career. Originally, Ian Watkins stated he wanted the new album to be "nastier" and "darker" than previous efforts, with more energy and vibe than before. In a blog post, guitarist Mike Lewis suggested that Ilan Rubin (who subsequently left the band to join Nine Inch Nails) was very much a large part of the writing/recording process. Following Rubin's departure, Luke Johnson of Beat Union was officially announced as the band's new drummer in August 2009. During this time, Kerrang! published a "world exclusive" article on Lostprophets, revealing the album's title, and its release date of January 2010. In a later interview with Kerrang in early 2009, Watkins stated that the record was "the most honest album" the band has ever done, and that overall the record was "a lot grittier and sleazier", while also stating that did not mean "it won't be catchy", but that it would not be done "in such a twee way". When speaking about what the record would sound like, Jamie Oliver stated that he felt it had "the bite that Start Something had, with the song-ability of Liberation Transmission but personality of The Fake Sound of Progress".

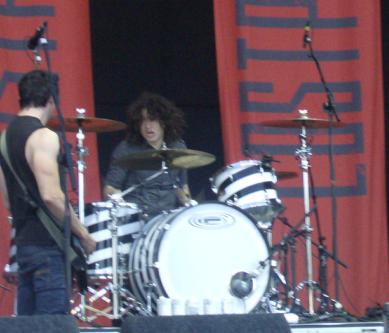
Ilan Rubin performing with Lostprophets at the Leeds Festival 2007. Rubin left the group in early 2009.

The band commenced their UK tour with support from Kids in Glass Houses, Hexes, We are the Ocean, and Sharks, in February 2010. The Doncaster date to the UK tour was cancelled and refunded, but no reason was given for the cancellation. The Port Talbot date of the tour was postponed and moved to a different venue due to a fire at the Afan Lido leisure centre. The show took place on 1 May at the Cardiff International Arena. Lostprophets confirmed that they would tour Australia. The tour took place on 27 March 2010 at The Roundhouse, NSW, Sydney. The band also played at the 2010 Reading and Leeds Festival.

Stu Richardson later reflected that "towards the end of 2009–2011 we realised Ian had a depressingly sad drug addiction. It just snuck up on us".

=== Weapons (2011–2012) ===
In early 2011, the band rented a house in Norfolk that served as their studio while composing a demo and pre-producing for a new album. The band were also to be featured on British rapper/producer Labrinth's album in late 2011.

In August 2011, the band went on a short UK tour, with dates in Cardiff, Bournemouth, Oxford and Norwich, as well as the two V Festival dates, and an additional appearance at the Sziget Festival in Budapest, Hungary. During this short tour, the band debuted live a new song from the upcoming album, tentatively titled "Bring 'Em Down".

The band's fifth studio album, Weapons, was released through Epic Records on 30 March 2012, leaving their long-time record label Visible Noise. Supported by a subsequent tour in the UK, Weapons was produced by Ken Andrews at NRG Recording Studios in Hollywood, California. The band released a teaser track in anticipation of their new album entitled "Better Off Dead" in January 2012, though it was confirmed the song is not an official single.

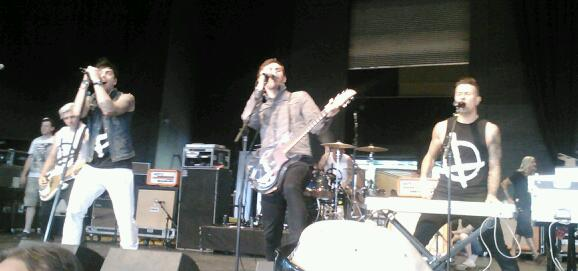
Lostprophets performing in July 2012

On 9 April, Lostprophets announced that they had signed to Fearless Records and would release Weapons in the United States on 19 June 2012. Lostprophets played in the Cardiff Motorpoint Arena on 28 April to promote their new album Weapons, and played their second studio album Start Something in its entirety. This show turned out to be a complete disaster for the band; Stu Richardson later explained that Watkins "didn't move for the whole set" and that he "sung the wrong words".

Lostprophets played select shows in Vans Warped Tour 2012, playing from 12 July through 5 August. Watkins relapsed into drug use during this tour and missed a show, leading to the band having to perform a set with Jamie Oliver on lead vocals. Watkins's temporary absence from the tour led to Stu Richardson having a violent altercation with him.

The band toured the UK extensively again in November 2012 to coincide with a headline performance at the Vans Warped Tour 2012 UK. They performed what would eventually become their final show at the Newport Centre, Newport, Wales on 14 November 2012.

=== Watkins' arrest and breakup (2012–2013) ===
On 19 December 2012, Watkins was charged with thirteen sexual offences against children, including the attempted rape of a one-year-old female toddler. Watkins originally denied the charges. The other band members posted a message on their website stating that they were "learning about the details of the investigation along with you" and concluding: "It is a difficult time for us and our families, and we want to thank our fans for their support as we seek answers." They subsequently cancelled all tour dates.

On 1 October 2013, Lostprophets announced that they were disbanding "after nearly a year of coming to terms with our heartache". The post was signed by all members of the band except Watkins. On 30 November, the members released a lengthy statement in response to Watkins pleading guilty to attempted rape and sexual assault of a child under 13, stating that they were "heartbroken, angry, and disgusted". They stated that they had been unaware of his crimes, and that though working with him had become "a constant, miserable challenge", they had "never imagined him capable of behaviour of the type he has now admitted". They urged any other victims to contact the authorities. On 18 December 2013, Watkins was sentenced to 29 years in prison, plus six years on extended licence, with a possibility of parole after serving two-thirds of his sentence.

On 25 April 2014, it was confirmed by the Thursday frontman Geoff Rickly that he would be working with the remaining band-members on their new project, from a record label perspective through his own label, Collect Records, as a producer and also joining them as a vocalist. Rickly said the material was influenced by Joy Division, New Order and the Cure. The new band was named No Devotion and they released their first two singles, "Stay" and "Eyeshadow", on 1 July 2014. On 11 October 2025, Watkins was killed in prison.

== Musical style and lyrical themes ==
Lostprophets have been categorised as nu metal, alternative rock, hard rock, alternative metal, post-hardcore, emo, pop-punk, rap rock, post-grunge, and pop metal. Their music is termed an aggressive style of rock, blending strong driving guitars, groove and bounce, and pop elements and accessibility.

The punk side to the band's music has been noted, again specifically of the pop variety. The influence of heavy metal on their music is also noted, although this varies from song to song. Their music has been praised as powerful, combining softer melodies with an aggressive edge, with screamed vocals and catchy riffs, while some have also stated it has a derivative, formulaic or forgettable nature.

Watkins's lyrics range from sombre to aggressive, and have been described as often conveying a feeling of disillusionment with topics such as relationships or social groups, albeit frequently delivered in a rousing manner even when this is the case. Critics have compared his singing style to Faith No More vocalist Mike Patton, with Watkins citing this band as his biggest influence in 2004. He said, "it's not a conscious thing. But the notes I choose to sing, and the melodies (we write) come from them because I spent so much time listening growing up." Lostprophets also garnered many other comparisons with more contemporary American bands of the early 2000s. Regarding the perception of them as an American-influenced band, Watkins commented in 2004 "we don't care if you think we're from Guam. Just as long as you listen."

They cited influences including Faith No More, Refused, Anthrax, The Police, The Prodigy, Dog Eat Dog, Vision of Disorder, Earth Crisis, Shelter, Jimmy Eat World, Hot Water Music, Deftones, Japandroids, LCD Soundsystem, Young Guns, Cerebral Ballzy, Kids in Glass Houses, Trash Talk, Polar Bear Club, Metallica, the Cure, Duran Duran and Depeche Mode.

== Band members ==
- Ian Watkins – lead vocals (1997–2012; died 2025); keyboards, turntables (1997–1999)
- Lee Gaze – lead guitar, backing vocals (1997–2013); rhythm guitar (1997–1998)
- Mike Lewis – rhythm guitar, backing vocals (1998–2013); bass (1997–1998)
- Mike Chiplin – drums, percussion (1997–2005)
- Stu Richardson – bass, backing vocals (1998–2013)
- DJ Stepzak – synthesizer, turntables, samples (1999–2000)
- Jamie Oliver – vocals, keyboards, synthesizer, piano, turntables, samples (2000–2013)
- Ilan Rubin – drums, percussion (2006–2009)
- Luke Johnson – drums, percussion (2009–2013)

Timeline

== Discography ==
- The Fake Sound of Progress (2000)
- Start Something (2004)
- Liberation Transmission (2006)
- The Betrayed (2010)
- Weapons (2012)

== Awards ==
Lostprophets had the most success at the Kerrang! Awards and Pop Factory Awards, winning six awards at both. Kerrang! Awards include: Best British Newcomer (2001), Best Single (2004) for the song "Last Train Home", Best Album (2006) for the album Liberation Transmission, Best British Band (2006 and 2007) and The Classic Songwriter Award (2010). Pop Factory Awards include: Best Live Act (2001 and 2006), Best Welsh Act (2004, 2005 and 2006) and Best Album (2006) for the album Liberation Transmission. They also won one award at the NME Awards for Best Metal Act (2002). Lostprophets were also nominated for seven other Kerrang! Awards.

=== Kerrang! awards ===
| Year | Nominee / work | Award | Result |
|---|---|---|---|
| 2001 | Lostprophets | Best British Newcomer | Won |
| 2004 | "Last Train Home" | Best Single | Won |
| 2004 | Start Something | Best Album | Nominated |
| 2004 | Lostprophets | Best British Band | Nominated |
| 2006 | Liberation Transmission | Best Album | Won |
| 2006 | Lostprophets | Best British Band | Won |
| 2006 | "Rooftops (A Liberation Broadcast)" | Best Videoclip | Nominated |
| 2007 | Lostprophets | Best British Band | Won |
| 2008 | Lostprophets | Best British Band | Nominated |
| 2010 | Lostprophets | Best British Band | Nominated |
| 2010 | It's Not the End of the World, But I Can See It from Here | Best Video | Nominated |
| 2010 | Lostprophets | The Classic Songwriter Award | Won |
| 2012 | Lostprophets | Best British Band | Nominated |

=== NME Awards ===
| Year | Nominee / work | Award | Result |
|---|---|---|---|
| 2002 | Lostprophets | Best Metal Act | Won |

=== Pop-Factory-Awards ===
| Year | Nominee / work | Award | Result |
|---|---|---|---|
| 2002 | Lostprophets | Best Live Act | Won |
| 2004 | Lostprophets | Best Welsh Act | Won |
| 2005 | Lostprophets | Best Welsh Act | Won |
| 2006 | Lostprophets | Best Welsh Act | Won |
| 2006 | Lostprophets | Best Live Act | Won |
| 2006 | Liberation Transmission | Best Album | Won |

== See also ==
- Blood on the Dance Floor
