= Lee Gaze =

Welsh guitarist (born 1975)

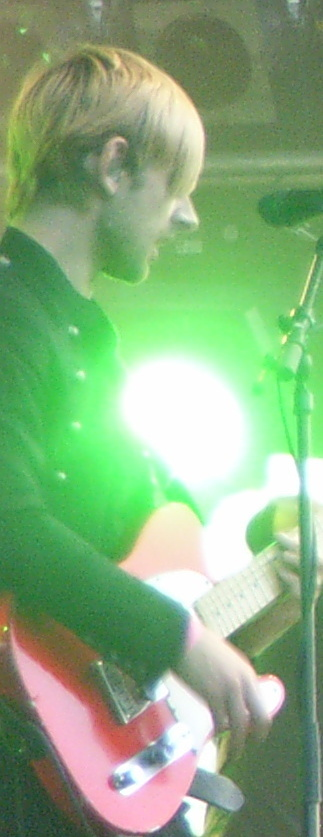
- Gaze performing with Lostprophets at Pinkpop 2007

Background information
- Born: Lee James Gaze; 21 May 1975 (age 51)
- Origin: Pontypridd, Wales
- Genres: Alternative rock; alternative metal
- Occupation: Guitarist
- Instrument: Guitar
- Years active: 1991–present
- Member of: No Devotion
- Formerly of: Aftermath; Fleshbind; Lostprophets

Lee James Gaze (born 21 May 1975) is a Welsh guitarist. He founded the alternative rock band Lostprophets with Ian Watkins in 1997, the two having previously been in a band called Fleshbind together. Lostprophets released five studio albums, four of which made the top 10 of the UK Albums Chart, including Liberation Transmission which went to number 1 in 2006. After Watkins was sentenced to 29 years' imprisonment in 2013 for multiple sexual offences, Gaze and the other Lostprophets members formed No Devotion with Thursday's Geoff Rickly.

== Early life ==
Gaze was born in Pontypridd and grew up on a council estate in the Pontypridd village Rhydyfelin. He did not do well at school as he was more interested in playing thrash metal: as he told Kerrang! in 2006, "Before I discovered music, I was a total delinquent, and then Iron Maiden changed my life. I had just been listening to pop before that. A friend of mine got hold of a tape and played to me and we got obsessed." He was also a huge fan of Megadeth, Metallica and Slayer.

== Career ==
In 1991, Gaze, Ian Watkins and Mike Lewis formed their first band called Aftermath. They recorded one demo and performed live a couple of times. In 1995, Gaze and Watkins formed Fleshbind, and recorded a demo named "Discontent". The band recorded two more demos and saw some success in their three-year career, including playing a show supporting Welsh band Feeder at the London Astoria.

Tired with the lack of direction, Gaze and Watkins disbanded Fleshbind and formed Lostprophets alongside Mike Chiplin on drums, later recruiting Mike Lewis, Stu Richardson and Jamie Oliver. Gaze was the lead guitarist and one of the band's key songwriters. Lostprophets disbanded in October 2013 after Watkins was arrested and later imprisoned for multiple sexual offences. The remaining members later formed a new band, No Devotion, with Geoff Rickly as lead singer. The band have released two albums, Permanence (2015) and No Oblivion (2022).

After Watkins was murdered in prison in October 2025, Gaze was the first ex-Lostprophets member to make any kind of public statement, thanking a fan on Twitter for their "kind words" after the fan had replied to an earlier thread.

Gaze revealed on his Twitter account that he has been currently working on a new project which is a follow up to the 2004 Lostprophets album Start Something with former bassist Stu Richardson and a new lead vocalist for recording for a potential 2026 release date.

== Personal life ==
In 2004, Gaze began dating London-based Malaysian former singer Syirin Said, who was a member of now-defunct Malaysian girl group M'Steen. They married in 2008. The couple have two sons. Gaze is straight edge and abstains from alcohol, smoking and recreational drugs.

== Discography ==
=== Studio albums ===
With Lostprophets

- The Fake Sound of Progress (2000)
- Start Something (2004)
- Liberation Transmission (2006)
- The Betrayed (2010)
- Weapons (2012)

With No Devotion

- Permanence (2015)
- No Oblivion (2022)
