= Mike Lewis (musician) =

Welsh guitarist (born 1977)

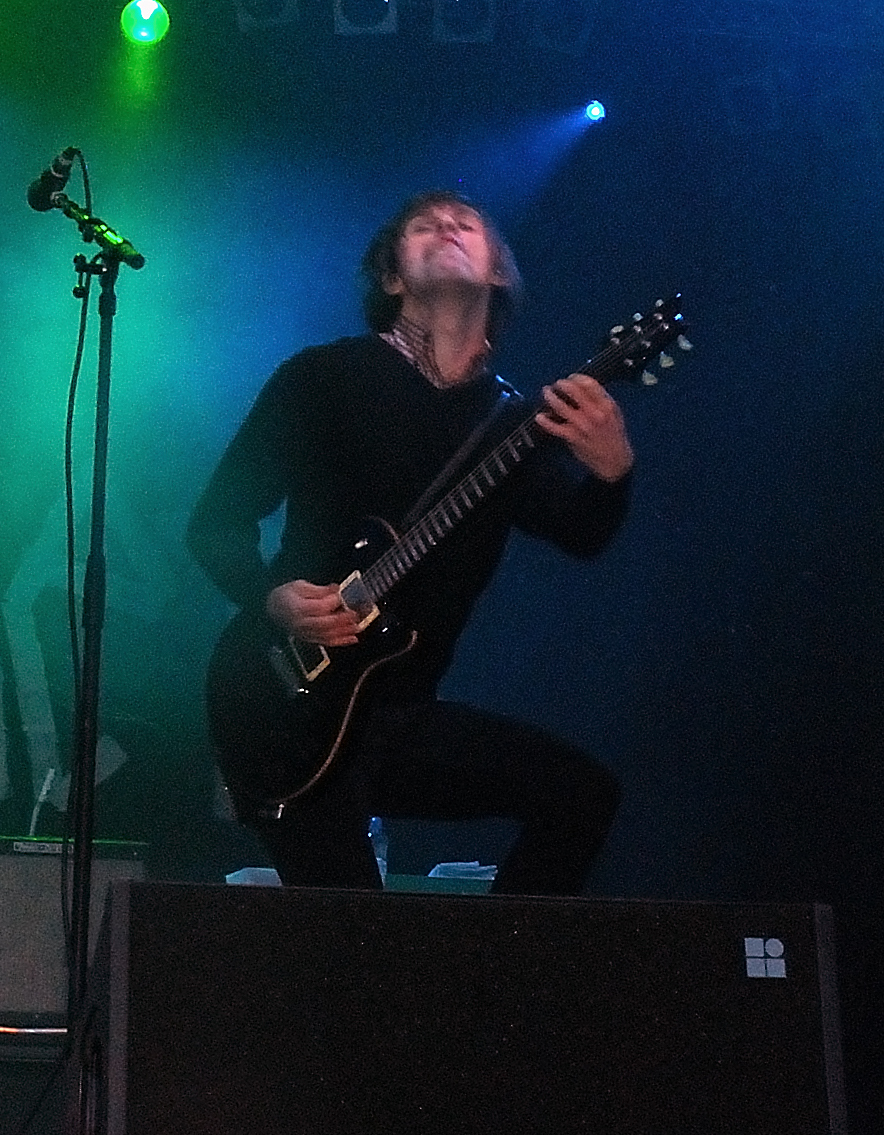
- Lewis performing with Lostprophets in 2007

Background information
- Born: Michael Richard Lewis; 17 August 1977 (age 49)
- Origin: Pontypridd, Wales
- Genres: Alternative rock
- Occupation: Musician
- Instruments: Guitar; bass (early)
- Years active: 1991–present
- Formerly of: Aftermath; Public Disturbance; Lostprophets; No Devotion
- Website: Mike Lewis on X

Michael Richard Lewis (born 17 August 1977) is a Welsh musician. He is best known as the former rhythm guitarist for the alternative rock band Lostprophets.

== Career ==
Before Lostprophets formed, Lewis was in a band in 1991 with Ian Watkins and Lee Gaze called Aftermath, a thrash metal band that played in a shed in Watkins' garden. Aftermath never recorded any material, but the band did play a few live performances at its two year lifespan. Shortly after Lewis and Watkins dissolved Aftermath, Lewis later joined a band called Public Disturbance. He was initially the original bassist for Lostprophets, but soon became the rhythm guitarist, with Stuart Richardson replacing him on the bass guitar. After the split of Lostprophets in 2013, Lewis became the manager to a few smaller bands.

On 1 May 2014, it was announced that the former members of Lostprophets (including Lewis) have formed a new band and are writing new music. On 1 July 2014, the new band No Devotion released their first single, "Stay" and have since released their debut album, Permanence.

Lee Gaze confirmed that keyboardist Jamie Oliver had departed from the band while also stating that Lewis had not left the band, but he had not worked with the other band members on the following album No Oblivion.

== Personal life ==
In September 2006, Lewis married his girlfriend, Amber (née Payne). They have a daughter, Gwyneth, and now reside in Malibu, a few streets away from ex-bandmates Jamie Oliver and Stuart Richardson. Amber runs Shoppe Amber Interiors. They separated in March 2023.

Lewis has stated on his Facebook page he is vegan. He follows the straight edge lifestyle.

== Equipment ==
- Guitars:
  - Dan Armstrong plexiglass
  - PRS Black Singlecut
  - PRS White Singlecut
  - PRS Black Custom 24
  - Fender Telecaster Deluxe 73
  - Gibson Les Paul Standard Black
  - Gibson SG Standard Black
  - Rickenbacker 330 Jetglow Black
- Amplification:
  - Fender Hotrod Deville 2×12 (semi distortion & clean)
  - Blackstar Artisan 30 Combo (semi distortion & clean)
  - Orange Thunderverb 200W Head (Main distortion)
  - Orange 4×12 Cabinet
- Effects:
  - Line 6 Delay Modeler DL4
  - Line 6 Modulation Modeler MM4
  - Boss Phaser
  - Electro Harmonix Holier Grail
  - Rocktron Hush Noise Gate
  - visual noise chorus
  - blackstar HT-Dual
  - Sennheiser Wireless System
  - Korg Rack Tuner
  - Furman Power Conditioner

== Discography ==
Public Disturbance

- 4-Way Tie Up (1997)
- UKHC Compilation (1997)
- Victim of Circumstance (1998)
- Possessed to Hate (1999)
- Ushering in a New Age of Quarrel – a UKHC Tribute to the Cro-Mags (1999)

Lostprophets

Studio albums

- The Fake Sound of Progress (2000)
- Start Something (2004)
- Liberation Transmission (2006)
- The Betrayed (2010)
- Weapons (2012)

No Devotion

- Permanence (2015)
