= Richard J Oliver =

Welsh artist, fitness instructor and former musician (born 1975)

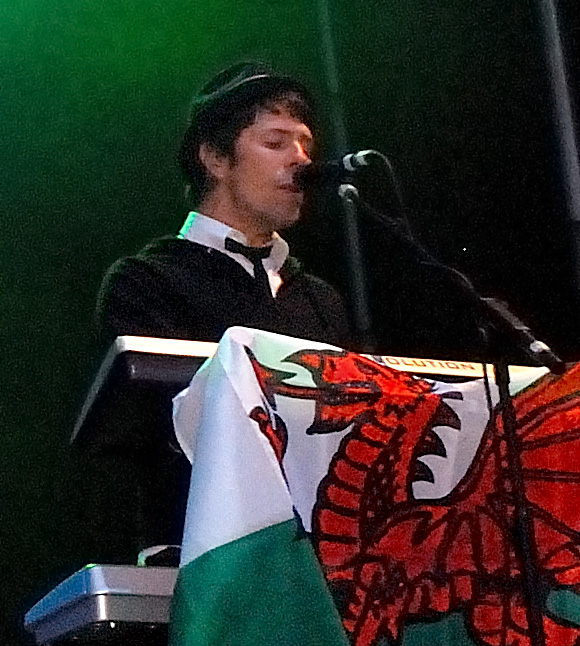
- Oliver performing with Lostprophets in 2007
- Born: Richard James Oliver; 16 July 1975 (age 51); Pontypridd, Wales
- Other name: Jamie Oliver
- Occupations: Musician; artist; painter; fitness instructor
- Years active: 2000–present
- Spouse: Michelle Oliver
- Musical career
- Genres: Alternative rock; nu metal; post-hardcore; emo; alternative metal
- Instruments: Vocals; keyboards; turntables; sampler; bass guitar
- Labels: Epic; Fearless; Sony; Columbia; Visible Noise
- Formerly of: Lostprophets; No Devotion

Richard James Oliver (born 16 July 1975), formerly known professionally by the nickname Jamie Oliver, is a Welsh former musician. He is best known as the longtime keyboardist, turntablist and supporting vocalist for Lostprophets. He was also a founding member of No Devotion. He quit the music industry in 2017 in order to focus on his art and fitness career.

== Early life ==
Oliver and the band remotely knew each other, as they were part of the same music scene. Oliver used to play bass guitar in small local bands in his late teens, and was offered a position as the lead vocalist in Ian Watkins and Lee Gaze's first band, Fleshbind. He declined the offer as he had to go to university.

Before joining the band, he was a painter. "I grew up in the valleys painting the villages, painting the people, painting the mountains," Oliver told Wales Online in April 2012. "That was all I knew, just the colours of the valleys. Having travelled round the world and living somewhere else now, those colours are unique to Wales," he added.

== Career ==
=== Music career ===
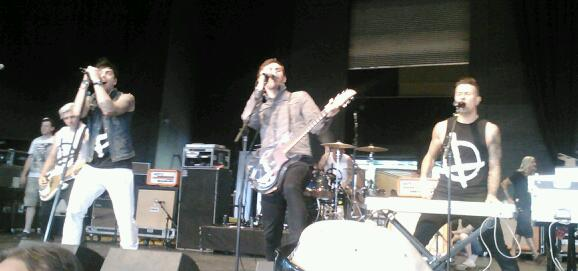
Oliver (right) with Lostprophets in July 2012

Lostprophets stated that Oliver was only added to the band so he could go on tour with them as a photographer, for they were impressed by his work. The band asked their management if they could bring Oliver on tour with them in 2000. They were told they could not afford to take someone who was not part of the band or their crew with them, so Oliver bought a set of turntables and quickly learnt what he needed to play. It is unclear how this occurrence coincides with ex-turntablist DJ Stepzak's departure from the band. As the band themselves worked on the remastered The Fake Sound of Progress, it can be assumed that the notably larger changes in the turntable and sample parts (recorded by Stepzak) compared to the other instruments is due to Oliver's influence on the record. In December 2012, after lead singer Ian Watkins was arrested and charged with multiple sexual offences involving children, Lostprophets disbanded.

Oliver was also the keyboard and synthesiser player and founding member of the Welsh/American alternative rock band No Devotion, whose debut album was released in September 2015 and won the Kerrang! Award for Best Album. He departed the band in 2017 to focus on his art career.

=== Subsequent work ===
Oliver is also an artist and had made quite a successful career before joining Lostprophets. Some of his works have been known to sell for up to £5,000 each. He studied fine art at the University of the West of England, Bristol. As an adolescent he used to take photos of small-town life in his Welsh village of Cilfynydd, in the community of Pontypridd, and painted them back on canvas. Then, as a student, he took interest in adapting the Tales of Mabinogion, traditional Welsh tales, into modern scenes. Oliver has worked with Ian Watkins on all of Lostprophets' artwork since 2003, possibly before, and he drew the pictures found in the booklet of the album Start Something (also used on covers for the "Burn Burn" single) personally. In 2012, Oliver was shortlisted for the Welsh Artist of the Year Award. Oliver's first showing in America opened in Los Angeles at the Known Gallery, in January 2013, displaying most of his newer works. Oliver also collaborated with the association skate4cancer, painting the piece "Dream, Love, Cure" and selling prints for the charity.

After Lostprophets disbanded, Oliver took up walking up mountains to improve his mental and physical health. Since October 2017 he has started working with fitness coaching and eventual training at 24 Hour Fitness, and he became a BodyPump and GX24 instructor.

== Personal life ==
Oliver resides in Los Angeles with his wife, Michelle.

== Discography ==
Lostprophets

- The Fake Sound of Progress (2001, remaster)
- Start Something (2004)
- Liberation Transmission (2006)
- The Betrayed (2010)
- Weapons (2012)

No Devotion

- Permanence (2015)
