= Ian Watkins =

Welsh musician and child sex offender (1977–2025)

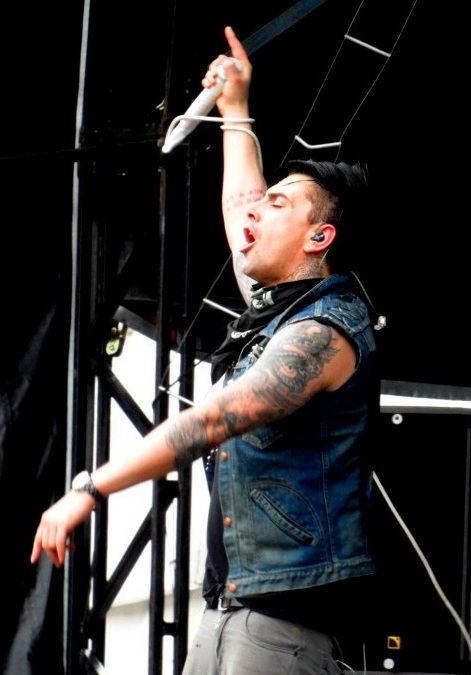
- Watkins performing with Lostprophets in 2010
- Born: Ian David Karslake Watkins; 30 July 1977; Merthyr Tydfil, Mid Glamorgan, Wales
- Died: 11 October 2025 (aged 48); HM Prison Wakefield, West Yorkshire, England
- Cause of death: Stab wound to the neck
- Status: Deceased
- Convictions: Attempted rape and sexual assault of a child under 13; Sexual assault involving children (3 counts); Taking, making, or possessing indecent images of children (6 counts); Possessing an extreme pornographic image involving a sex act on an animal; Possession of mobile phone in prison
- Penalty: 29 years and 10 months imprisonment, plus 6 years on extended licence

Details
- Victims: 2 confirmed, more suspected
- Date apprehended: 17 December 2012
- Musical career
- Genres: Alternative rock; hard rock; nu metal; hardcore punk; rap metal (early)
- Instruments: Vocals; drums
- Years active: 1991–2012
- Formerly of: Aftermath; Fleshbind; Public Disturbance; Lostprophets

Ian David Karslake Watkins (30 July 1977 – 11 October 2025) was a Welsh singer, songwriter, and convicted child sex offender. He was the lead singer, lyricist and frontman of the rock band Lostprophets from 1997 to 2012. Watkins founded Lostprophets with Lee Gaze in 1997, having previously been in a band called Fleshbind with him. Lostprophets released five studio albums, four of which made the top 10 of the UK Albums Chart, including Liberation Transmission which went to number 1 in 2006.

Watkins was sentenced to 29 years' imprisonment in 2013 for multiple sexual offences. He pleaded guilty to sexual assault of children, including those as young as infants, and the possession of child and animal sexual abuse material. His bandmates disbanded Lostprophets shortly before his trial. He was sentenced to a further ten months' imprisonment following the discovery of a mobile phone in his cell.

Watkins died after his throat was slashed while imprisoned at HM Prison Wakefield on 11 October 2025. Four prisoners were charged with his death, two for murder and two for conspiracy.

== Early life ==
Ian David Karslake Watkins was born on 30 July 1977 in Merthyr Tydfil, Mid Glamorgan, Wales. His father died when he was five and his mother remarried a church minister three years later. He later moved to Pontypridd, where he attended Hawthorn High School. Future Lostprophets bandmate Mike Lewis was in his school year. He gained a first class degree in graphic design from the University of Wales, Newport. Watkins grew up listening to mostly American rock and metal music, and in 2004 mentioned the band Faith No More as his biggest influence. Watkins was an atheist.

== Career ==
As teenagers, Lewis, Gaze and Watkins' mutual enjoyment of rock and metal music strengthened their friendship. In 1991, they formed Aftermath, a thrash metal band that played in a shed in Watkins' garden. Having abandoned Aftermath, which made two live appearances in its lifespan of two years, Watkins and Lee Gaze formed a new band, Fleshbind, based on their American hardcore punk influences, for whom Watkins played drums. The band played several shows, including one supporting Feeder in London, but disbanded after its singer left. After Watkins' request to move to vocals in Fleshbind was denied, he and Gaze left and formed "Lozt Prophetz" as a more "back to basics" band.

Watkins was concurrently the drummer for a beatdown hardcore band called Public Disturbance from 1995, which also featured Lewis. Lozt Prophetz made their live debut in May 1997 alongside Public Disturbance, with Watkins as the lead vocalist. In 1998, Public Disturbance released their debut album Victim of Circumstance on Days of Fury Records, which features drumming by Watkins. Later that year, he left Public Disturbance to concentrate on the newly named Lostprophets.

In a 2002 interview, following the release of Lostprophets' debut album The Fake Sound of Progress, Watkins cited the band's concert at the Cardiff Coal Exchange in December 2001 as a crucial moment in their timeline, stating: "It was incredible. Everybody who's been around on the scene knows who we are and it was nice to have that kind of recognition."

In 2003, Watkins was featured on the Hoobastank song "Out of Control" along with Richard James Oliver, who was by then a member of Lostprophets.

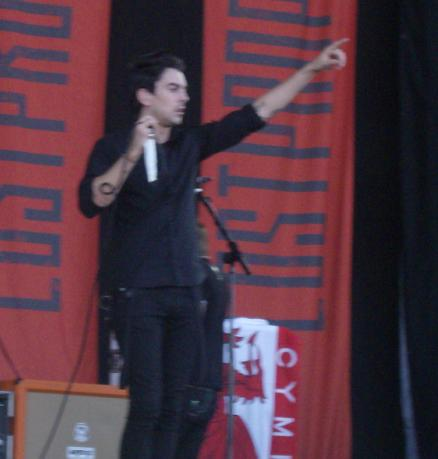
Watkins performing with Lostprophets at Leeds Festival in 2007

In 2006, speaking at the Welsh Pop Factory awards ceremony in Cardiff following Lostprophets winning three awards, including "Best Welsh Band", Watkins stated that "to win best band in the best country in the world is wicked".

On New Year's Eve 2008, Watkins took part in a concert for Kidney Wales Foundation and stated that his reasons for being involved were as a result of his mother needing a kidney transplant: "Having that direct experience is why I wanted to get more involved with Kidney Wales and organise a fundraising concert on New Year's Eve."

Watkins was also featured on the Blackout's song "It's High Tide Baby!" from their debut studio album We Are the Dynamite (2007), and accompanied them on tour.

Lostprophets released five studio albums: The Fake Sound of Progress (2000), Start Something (2004), Liberation Transmission (2006), The Betrayed (2010), and Weapons (2012). They toured extensively in Europe and the United States, playing shows such as the Reading and Leeds Festivals in 2007.

As time went on, Watkins distanced himself from the other band members, spending much of his time at his residence in Wales during their off-time, while the rest of his bandmates resided in Los Angeles. Tension grew between him and the others, escalating into an altercation with bassist Stuart Richardson after Watkins failed to report for a show.

On 1 October 2013, shortly before Watkins' trial, Lostprophets announced that they were disbanding "after nearly a year of coming to terms with our heartache". The post was signed by all members of the band except Watkins.

== Sexual offences and other criminal activity ==
Watkins' abuse of and misconduct with children was reported as early as 2008 to South Wales Police, though the authorities failed to act upon the leads. This included both sexual abuse of children and giving children drugs, including cocaine. Watkins' former bandmates said they were unaware of this conduct, as his drug use had strained his relationship with them. Watkins had requested a private dressing room where much of his abuse allegedly occurred. Watkins had also minimised contact with most of his bandmates.

Joanne Mjadzelics, an ex-girlfriend of Watkins, recalled that he possessed graphic images involving minors and drug paraphernalia as early as 2010. Appalled by the content, Mjadzelics made multiple complaints to South Wales Police, though little action was taken at the time. She was one of six people who had spoken to the police regarding Watkins' conduct from 2008 to 2011. In 2010, an Australian woman accused Watkins of assaulting her child, though the allegations were not investigated any further by authorities. During the recording of the band's fourth studio album, The Betrayed, in 2009, Mjadzelics was made aware by Watkins that he was abusing a two-year-old child in California whilst the band was recording in Los Angeles. Mjadzelics contacted the child's parents, who had also reported him to Welsh authorities (child sex offences committed by British nationals are crimes of extraterritorial jurisdiction in England and Wales), though again, no further action was taken to investigate the matter.

=== Arrest and conviction ===
Watkins was first apprehended in June 2012 in connection with various drug charges, and he was granted bail shortly afterwards. Watkins had already attracted attention from Welsh law enforcement after several friends reported that he was regularly smuggling cocaine and methamphetamine from Los Angeles. He was arrested again on 4 November for drug possession and a separate allegation that he possessed an obscene image of a child. He pleaded not guilty to the charges of possessing explicit material shortly after being granted bail yet again. Watkins performed his final show with Lostprophets on 14 November 2012 in Newport, Wales. He was arrested for a third time on 17 December 2012 on another drug possession charge. South Wales Police immediately conducted a search of his home and computer in connection to their prior investigation. During the search, officers discovered numerous indecent images of children stored on his computer.

On 19 December 2012, Watkins was charged at Cardiff magistrates court with conspiracy to engage in sexual activity with a one-year-old girl and possession and/or distribution of indecent images of children and "extreme animal pornography". He was remanded in custody, as were two women who stood co-accused. Watkins' barrister said Watkins would deny the accusations. On 31 December, he appeared at Cardiff Crown Court via video link from HM Prison Parc in Bridgend, and was remanded in custody until 11 March 2013. The case was adjourned until May, with the trial date set for 15 July. At a hearing on 3 June, he denied all charges via a video link.

On 6 June 2013, it was announced that the trial would start on 25 November and was expected to last a month. A previous application for the court venue to be moved outside Wales was denied. On 26 November, Watkins pleaded guilty to attempted rape and sexual assault of a child under 13, but not guilty to rape. This was accepted by the prosecution. He further pleaded guilty to three counts of sexual assault involving children; six counts of taking, making, or possessing indecent images of children; and one count of possessing an extreme pornographic image involving a sex act on an animal. His victims included a baby boy, and he sent a text message to the mother of one victim that said, "If you belong to me, so does your baby." The South Wales Police investigation into Watkins, codenamed "Operation Globe", required the co-operation of GCHQ to decrypt a hidden drive on his laptop, which was found to contain video evidence of his abuses. Investigators later bypassed the encrypted password to Watkins' laptop, noting that it read "I FUK KIDZ". On 27 November, the day after his guilty plea had been accepted by the prosecution, Watkins referred to his sex offences as "mega lolz" in a recorded phone call to a female fan made from HM Prison Parc.

A sentencing hearing was held at Cardiff on 18 December 2013. In mitigation, Watkins' barrister, Sally O'Neill QC, said that Watkins had no recollection of the attempted rape, but had "belatedly realised the gravity of what happened" after having developed an "obsession" with videoing himself having sex. Justice John Royce sentenced Watkins to 29 years in prison, with eligibility to apply for parole in 2031 after serving two-thirds of his prison term, followed by six years of supervised release. His two co-defendants, the mothers of his victims, received sentences of 14 and 17 years' imprisonment. The judge said the case "plunged into new depths of depravity", stating that Watkins had a "corrupting influence" and had shown a "complete lack of remorse".

A senior investigating officer on the case described Watkins as a "committed, organised paedophile" and "potentially the most dangerous sex offender" he had ever seen. Suzanne Thomas, of the Crown Prosecution Service, said: "He is a highly dangerous and manipulative individual who preyed on his victims in a calculated manner." Watkins' parents told the Daily Mail in 2013 of their horror at their son's "heinous crimes". In July 2014 Watkins' appeal to reduce the length of his jail term was rejected. Appeal judges said his offences were "of such shocking depravity that they demanded a lengthy prison sentence".

=== Police failings ===
An Independent Police Complaints Commission (IPCC) investigation report published in 2016 said that three detectives from the South Wales force should face disciplinary action after they failed to act on earlier allegations of abuse by Watkins from 2008 onward. A further IPCC report, published in August 2017, found that police had failed a number of times from 2008 to 2012 to act on reports of Watkins' behaviour, quoting a detective who said that taking action against Watkins would draw "huge publicity" and that due to his fame Watkins had "a number of fans and ex-girlfriends making allegations that when investigated are false". The report concluded:

The consequence of the force's failings was arguably that a predatory paedophile offended over an extended period of time. The evidence obtained in this investigation suggests that South Wales Police were faced with a litany of reports about his behaviour, yet in some instances did not carry out even rudimentary investigation, made errors and omissions and missed opportunities to bring him to justice earlier than he ultimately was.

South Wales Police Assistant Chief Constable Jeremy Vaughan said his force "entirely accepts and regrets" the findings.

== Imprisonment ==
Watkins was transferred from HM Prison Parc, where he had been incarcerated while on remand, to HM Prison Wakefield to begin serving his sentence. To be closer to his mother after she had a kidney transplant, he was transferred to HM Prison Long Lartin on 25 January 2014. On 9 October 2017, Watkins was accused of grooming by a two-year-old girl's mother from prison through a series of letters. In response to the report, a spokesman for the NSPCC said: "This is an absolute shambles. We're sickened. It's utterly bewildering that he could carry on grooming. It shows contempt for children he abused, and raises serious questions about supervision." By March 2018, Watkins was back at HM Prison Wakefield.

=== Possession of mobile phone ===
In March 2018, Watkins was found with a mobile phone. He was accused of using it to contact a girlfriend. Watkins denied this, asserting it belonged to two inmates who forced him to hide it for them. He refused to give names, citing fear of violent retaliation. A charger for the phone was also found in his cell. Watkins said he still received fan mail from Lostprophets fans and that the men wanted him to help them take advantage of the women writing in as a "revenue stream". After a five-day trial at Leeds Crown Court in August 2019, he was convicted and sentenced to a further ten months in prison.

=== Hostage incident and stabbing ===
On the morning of 5 August 2023, Watkins was taken hostage by three inmates at HM Prison Wakefield and stabbed. He was freed by prison officers six hours later. His injuries were not life-threatening. Watkins later stated in a letter sent to a fan from prison that he had bleeds on his brain and permanent spinal nerve damage after the attack.

== Death ==
On the morning of 11 October 2025, Watkins, aged 48, died after being stabbed in the head and neck at HM Prison Wakefield. He was pronounced dead at the scene after the incident was reported by prison staff. West Yorkshire Police charged Rashid "Rico" Gedel, 25, and Samuel Dodsworth, 43, with murder. Dodsworth is serving a 24-year prison term for abduction and rape and Gedel a life sentence with a minimum term of 27 years for the murder of a man mistaken for a drug debtor. Two other men, aged 23 and 39, were arrested for conspiracy to murder. A September 2025 report had found that violence in the prison had "increased markedly". A former prison governor, Ian Acheson, said that Watkins was "a high profile and notorious offender whose risk from others was well known".

The trial began on 5 May 2026. The jury was discharged for legal reasons on 22 May, with a retrial provisionally set for February 2027.

== Discography ==
Public Disturbance

- Victim of Circumstance (1998)
- Possessed to Hate (1999)

Lostprophets

- The Fake Sound of Progress (2000)
- Start Something (2004)
- Liberation Transmission (2006)
- The Betrayed (2010)
- Weapons (2012)

=== Featured performances ===
- "Secret" by Amazing Device
- "Out of Control" by Hoobastank
- "War" by Goldfinger
- "Getting Better" by Utah Saints

== See also ==
- Dahvie Vanity
