= Stu Richardson =

Welsh bassist (born 1973)

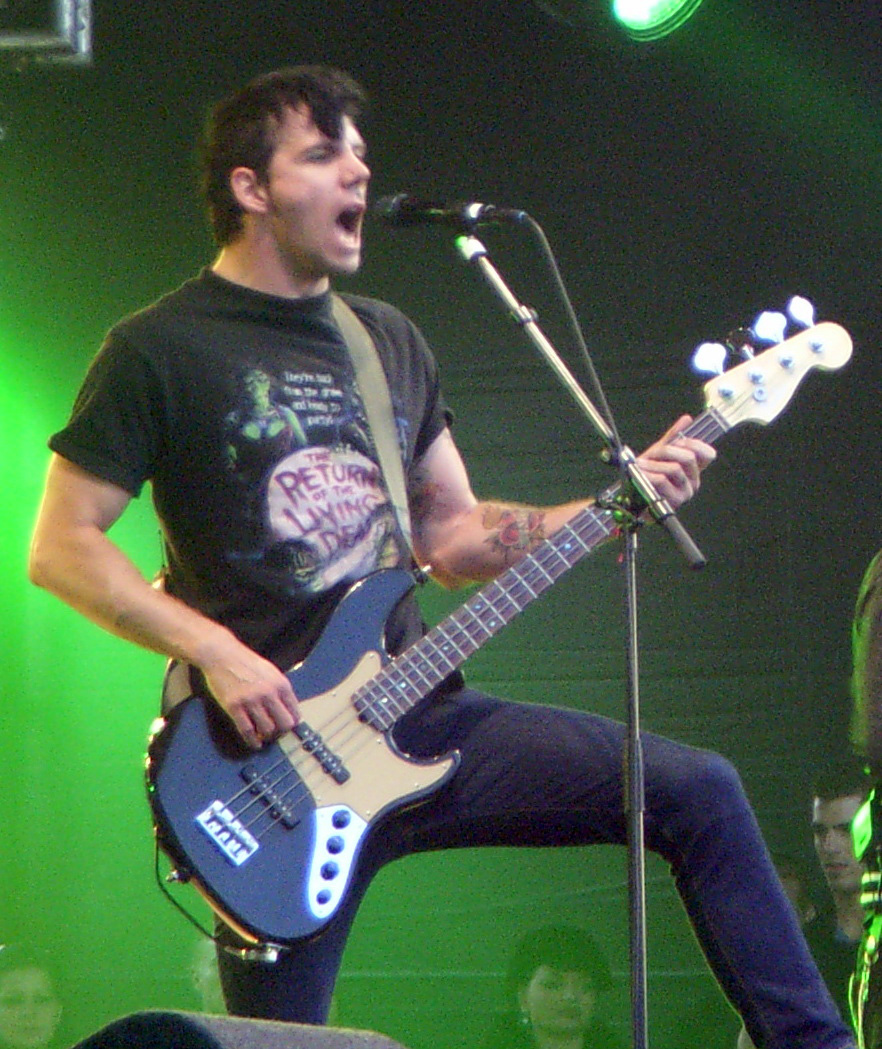
- Richardson performing with Lostprophets at Pinkpop 2007

Background information
- Born: 15 August 1973 (age 53)
- Origin: Tonypandy, Wales
- Genre: Alternative rock
- Occupations: Bassist; producer; songwriter
- Instruments: Bass guitar
- Years active: 1990s–present
- Member of: No Devotion
- Formerly of: Lostprophets
- Website: www.sturichardson.com

Stuart Richardson (born 15 August 1973) is a Welsh bassist. He currently plays for the alternative rock band No Devotion and was previously a member of Lostprophets. He is also the touring bassist for US rock band Thursday.

== Early life and influences ==
Richardson is an only child. His mother worked in a butcher's shop, bar and doctor's office, and his dad was a miner. Richardson has said that one of his earliest musical obsessions was David Bowie. He was inspired to learn to play bass by Steve Harris of Iron Maiden.

== Career ==
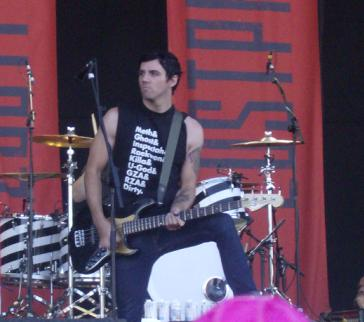
Richardson performing with Lostprophets at Leeds Festival 2007

Richardson's career in the music industry started off in the mid-1990s, working as a producer in his local area in Wales. By the late 1990s he was working as an engineer at Front Line Studios in Caerphilly, which is where he first met the other members of Lostprophets. He replaced Mike Lewis as bassist in Lostprophets after Mike switched to rhythm guitar, joining them in 1998 just before they recorded their third demo. He had worked with the band previously, having produced their first two demos. Lostprophets were signed to Columbia Records and Visible Noise in 2000 and released five studio albums.

In October 2013, ten months after lead singer Ian Watkins was arrested and charged with multiple sexual offences, Richardson and the remaining members of the band announced that they could "no longer make or perform music as Lostprophets". "Not only did [Watkins] take 15 years' [work] away from me, but he took away my future as well," Richardson told The Daily Telegraph. "Because even though the band was starting to decline, we could have gone away for a couple of years and then come back with the hope that people might give a shit. So we thought about calling it a day for a bit and then returning and going on the road and playing all our greatest hits until we were dead. That was the retirement plan, but that's all gone now."

Six months after the announcement, they formed a new band, No Devotion, with Thursday's Geoff Rickly as their new lead singer. The band have released two albums, Permanence (2015) and No Oblivion (2022).

During an appearance on the Sappenin' Podcast with Sean Smith in December 2019, Richardson revealed the reason why they formed a new band. "We didn't catch our breath after the whole thing went down with [Watkins]. So I was like, well 'fuck if that's gonna be the thing that's on my fucking gravestone.' Like 'Oh, that guy was in that band with that fucking prick.' It's like, fuck that. I'm gonna do my own band immediately." During the same interview, Richardson revealed that he had engaged in a violent altercation with Watkins in 2012, as the latter's drug use put much strain on his relationship with the remaining band members prior to his conviction.

Richardson has been the touring bassist of American rock band Thursday since 2017. He also played bass and produced the band's singles from 2024 ("Application For Release From The Dream", "White Bikes" and "Taking Inventory Of A Frozen Lake"). These singles were the first new songs released by Thursday in 13 years.

== Personal life ==
Richardson is the co-owner of Rocky Water Studios, a studio based in the Eau Gallie Arts District of Melbourne Beach, Florida.

Richardson resides in Los Angeles, California, with his wife Marissa and their two daughters. He is currently endorsed by Orange Amplifiers.

== Discography ==
=== With No Devotion ===
- Permanence (2015)
- No Oblivion (2022)

=== With Lostprophets ===
- The Fake Sound of Progress (EP) (1999)
- The Fake Sound of Progress (2000)
- Start Something (2004)
- Liberation Transmission (2006)
- The Betrayed (2010)
- Weapons (2012)

=== With Thursday ===
- Application For Release From The Dream (Single) (2024)
- White Bikes (Single) (2024)
- Taking Inventory Of A Frozen Lake (Single) (2025)

=== Other (selected) ===
- Funeral for a Friend – Memory & Humanity (Backing vocals) (2008)
- Attack! Attack! – Attack! Attack! (Producer, Engineer, Mixing) (2008)
- Suburban Myth – Sick Feeling (Mixing) (2015)
- Bars and Melody – Generation Z (Producer, Mixing, Composer) (2017)
- Cyclone Static – From Scratch (Mixing, Mastering) (2019)
