= Upper Edmonton =

Coordinates: 51.614°N 0.063°W

Upper Edmonton: The Angel
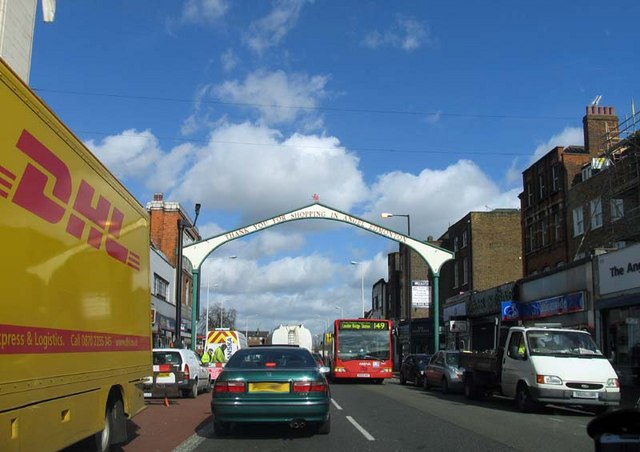

- Location within Greater London
- Population: 17,374 (2011 Census. Ward)
- London borough: Enfield
- Ceremonial county: Greater London
- Region: London
- Country: England
- Sovereign state: United Kingdom
- Post town: London
- Postcode district: N18
- Dialling code: 020
- Police: Metropolitan
- Fire: London
- Ambulance: London
- UK Parliament: Edmonton and Winchmore Hill
- London Assembly: Enfield and Haringey

Upper Edmonton is the southern part of Edmonton, North London within the London Borough of Enfield. The main shopping area of Upper Edmonton on Fore Street is often referred to as "The Angel" by locals in reference to the former Angel public house that was demolished in 1968 to make improvements to the North Circular Road. The area borders Lower Edmonton to the north and Tottenham to the south, and is the location of North Middlesex University Hospital.

Increased levels of immigration in recent years has led to the area becoming ethnically and culturally diverse, with local businesses and places of worship reflecting the area's diversity. Upper Edmonton is the location of the Meridian Water regeneration programme on a 210-acre site adjacent to the North Circular Road and Lea Valley, containing the Ravenside Retail Park and the Drumsheds music venue and night club.

The area is served by Silver Street and Meridian Water railway stations, with Angel Road having closed in 2019. Edmonton Green and White Hart Lane stations are to the north and south of the area respectively.

== Deprivation score ==
Analysis carried out by the Local Government Association indicates that, within Enfield, Upper Edmonton has been calculated to be the 2nd most deprived of the 21 wards in the Borough. In addition, the same analysis estimates that it is within the 10% most deprived wards in both London and England.

== Low Income households ==
Upper Edmonton had the 3rd lowest average (median) household income of the 21 wards in Enfield as estimated by CACI in 2018. Average household income in the ward is below the median level for the borough as a whole. The proportion of households with an income of less than £15,000 was put at 24.2% compared to a Borough average of 16.7%. This was the 3rd highest proportion of the 21 wards.

== Benefit Claimants ==
At November 2017 the number of people claiming the main working-age DWP benefits was 1,935 – 15.2% of the estimated working age population. This is higher than the Enfield Borough average of 12.8%

== Crime ==
According to data from the Metropolitan Police Service, the crime rate for May 2024 to May 2025 is 208 crimes per 1000 population, with the most common offenses being related to theft, handling stolen goods, burglary, criminal damage, drugs and robbery. Upper Edmonton has a crime rate 87% higher than the overall crime rate for the Borough of Enfield (111 crimes per 1000 population for the same time period).

== Recent trends ==
In recent years, the area has undergone a huge structural transformation, of which some work is still undergoing, as part of the government's aim to provide the community with a wider range of shops and public facilities. It is the site of regeneration project, Meridian Water.

As in many other parts of the city, a major concern is the level of violent crime, which has steadily increased over the past few years. The effort from local role models to work with government to provide education for local youths is one of the most concentrated methods of trying to overcome this problem.

== Politics ==
Upper Edmonton is part of the Edmonton and Winchmore Hill constituency for elections to the House of Commons of the United Kingdom.

Upper Edmonton is part of the Upper Edmonton ward for elections to Enfield London Borough Council.
