= Edmonton, London =

Town and District of London, England

Edmonton
- All Saints' Church, the parish church of Edmonton, dating back to the 12th century

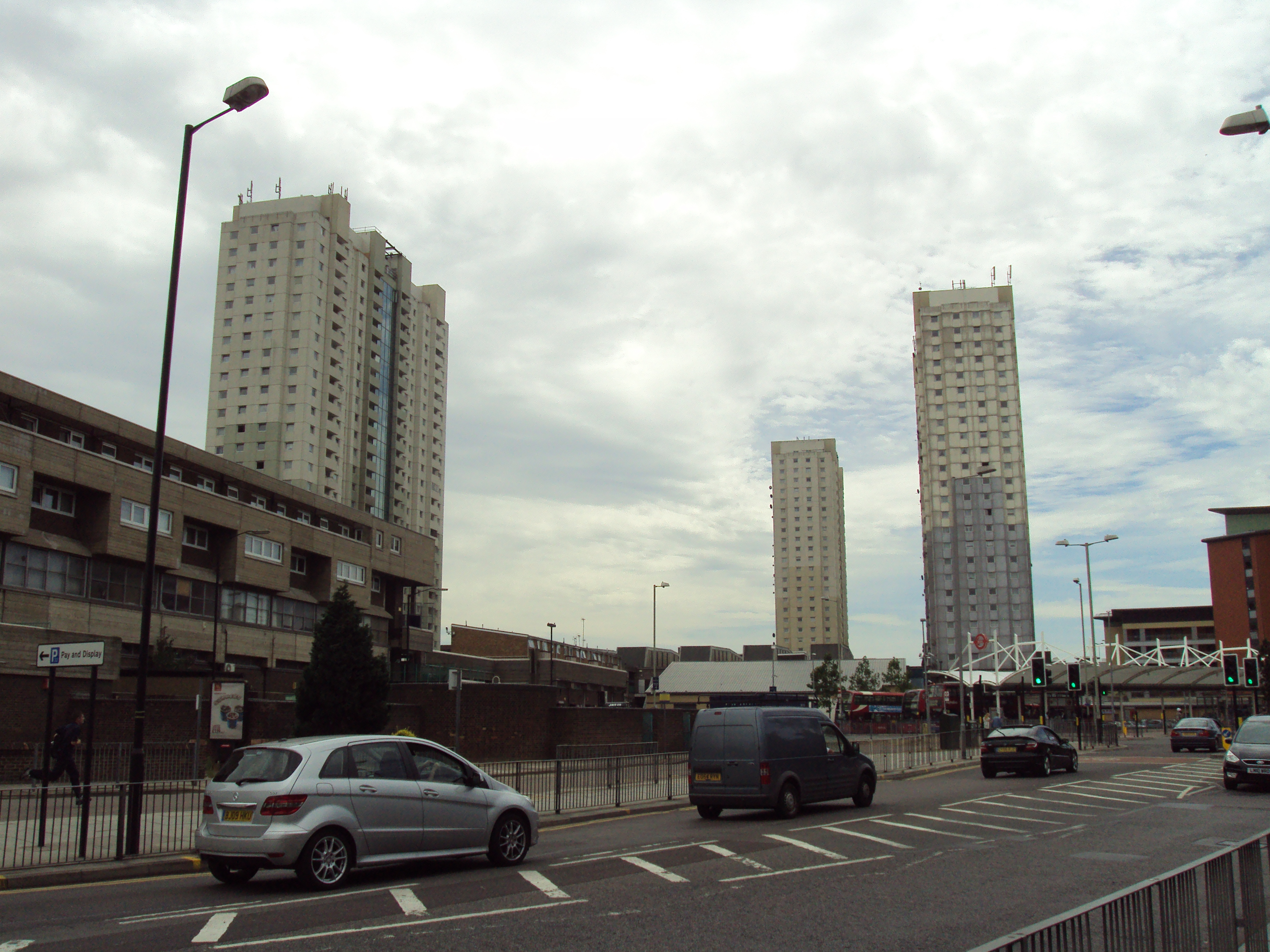
- Tower blocks at Lower Edmonton

- Location within Greater London
- Population: 80,546 (2011 Census)
- OS grid reference: TQ335925
- London borough: Enfield
- Ceremonial county: Greater London
- Region: London
- Country: England
- Sovereign state: United Kingdom
- Post town: LONDON
- Postcode district: N9, N18
- Dialling code: 020
- Police: Metropolitan
- Fire: London
- Ambulance: London
- UK Parliament: Edmonton and Winchmore Hill
- London Assembly: Enfield and Haringey

Edmonton (/ɛdməntən/) is a town in north London, England within the London Borough of Enfield, a local government district of Greater London. The northern part of the town is known as Lower Edmonton or Edmonton Green, and the southern part as Upper Edmonton or The Angel. Situated 8.4 miles (13.5 km) north-northeast of Charing Cross, it borders Enfield to the north, Chingford to the east, and Tottenham to the south, with Palmers Green and Winchmore Hill to the west. The population of Edmonton was 82,472 as of 2011.

The town forms part of the ceremonial county of Greater London and until 1965 was in the ancient county of Middlesex. Historically a parish in the Edmonton Hundred of Middlesex, Edmonton became an urban district in 1894, and a municipal borough in 1937. Local government took place at the now-demolished Edmonton Town Hall in Fore Street between 1855 and 1965. In 1965, following reform of local government in London, the municipal borough and former parish of Edmonton was abolished, merging with that of Enfield and Southgate to form the new local government district of Enfield, a borough of Greater London.

Once a rural village, the opening of the railway and tramway in the 19th century, especially the opening of the high-level station at Lower Edmonton, caused the area to expand rapidly, forming part of the metropolitan and urban area of London, similar to much of the county of Middlesex. The late 19th century saw the establishment of industry on former marshland and movement of a working-class population to the area, encouraging much of this development. By the 1930s, the area had become a popular north London shopping destination, and in the 1960s and 1970s, the area underwent major redevelopment, with the construction of the Edmonton Green indoor market and shopping centre, as well as mass construction of council housing, including tower blocks. In recent years, as a result of increased levels of immigration, the town has been transformed from a predominantly white area into one of the most ethnically diverse areas in England, with the majority of the population now belonging to an ethnic minority background, as first recorded in the 2011 census.

In 1795, Fort Edmonton in Canada was named after the town in Middlesex. The fort evolved into the city of Edmonton, the capital city of Alberta, Canada.

== Geography and location ==
Edmonton is 8.4 miles (13.5 km) north-northeast of Charing Cross and stretches from just south of the North Circular Road, where it borders Tottenham, to its boundary with Ponders End to the north. Bush Hill Park, Winchmore Hill and Palmers Green adjoin the western boundary along the Great Cambridge Road, while the River Lee Diversion forms Edmonton's eastern boundary with Chingford. The northern part of Edmonton, known as Lower Edmonton, corresponds to the N9 postcode area. Upper Edmonton, the southern part of the town, corresponds to the N18 postcode area. Edmonton lies about 52 feet (16 m) above sea level. The largest public parks are Pymmes Park and Jubilee Park.

== History ==
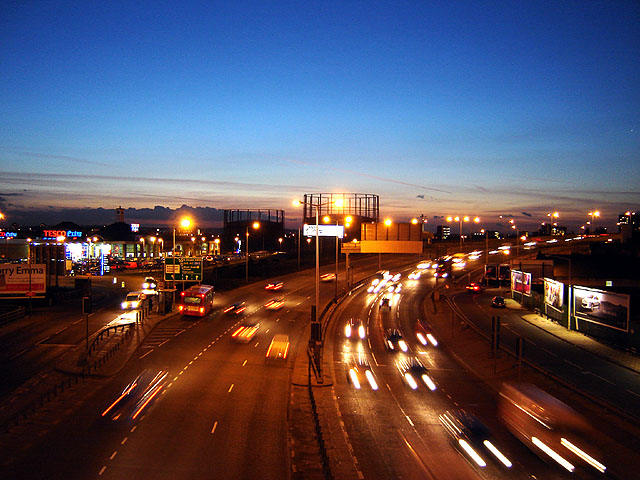
Angel Road, Edmonton, at dusk. Edmonton gasworks on horizon. (February 2006)

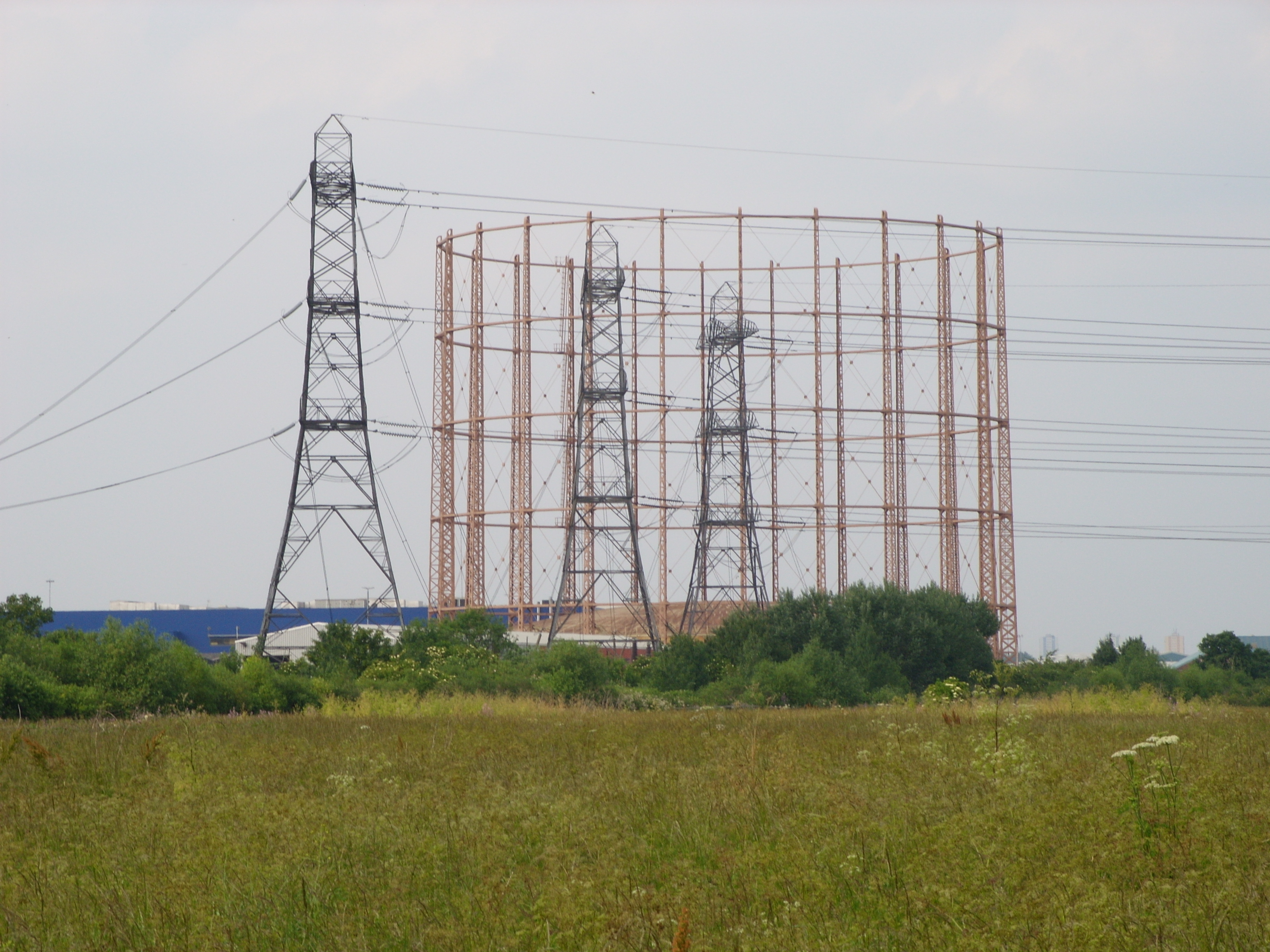
Edmonton gasworks seen from Tottenham Marshes

The main Roman road, Ermine Street, passed through what is today Edmonton. It ran from London to Lincoln and on to York. Edmonton appears in the Domesday Book of 1086, where it is recorded as Adelmetone—'a farmstead or estate of a man called Ēadhelm', from an Old English personal name and tūn.

Edmonton Hundred was a division of the historic county of Middlesex from Saxon times, an area of some 31,000 acres (130 km^{2}) stretching up the west bank of the Lea from Tottenham to the county boundary south of Waltham Cross, and west into what is now Hertfordshire as far as South Mimms. Local government in the modern sense began in 1837 with the Edmonton Union, set up under the Poor Law Amendment Act 1834. This body also covered a wide district of 47,102 acres (190.62 km^{2}), including the modern boroughs of Haringey and Enfield, plus Cheshunt, Waltham Abbey and Waltham Cross. The town hall was built in 1884 and extended in 1903. The crenelated perpendicular Edmonton Town Hall was built in 1884 to the designs of George Eedes Eachus. The building was enlarged in 1902–3 by W. Gilbee Scott, who added public swimming baths. The baths were replaced by the Edmonton Green Swimming Pool in 1970 and the town hall was demolished in 1989.

The population of this area grew rapidly, reaching 445,875 by 1911 and would today be about 615,000. As the population mushroomed, smaller areas within Middlesex were used for local government, with a local board being formed for the 3,894 acres (15.76 km^{2}) parish of Edmonton in 1850, which eventually achieved the status of municipal borough as the Municipal Borough of Edmonton in 1937. At the 1961 census the borough had a population of 91,956. This was absorbed into the London Borough of Enfield in 1965, and the former town hall and civic buildings were controversially demolished by Enfield Council in 1989.

Pymmes Park with its historic walled garden is Upper Edmonton's park. Pymmes Park originated as a private estate. In the late 16th century it was owned by the powerful Cecil family. In 1589 Robert Cecil, later 1st Earl of Salisbury, spent his honeymoon at Pymmes. Cecil was a protege of Francis Walsingham, Elizabeth I's chief spymaster and he succeeded him as Secretary of State in 1590. The estate was eventually acquired by Edmonton Council and opened as a public park in 1906. Pymmes House was destroyed by fire during the Second World War and the remains were demolished.

In the 17th century the then rural Edmonton had a reputation for supernatural activities. In approximately 1600, a play entitled The Merry Devil of Edmonton was performed in London about a wizard who lived there. In 1621 the villagers accused an old woman, Elizabeth Sawyer, of witchcraft and she was subsequently executed at Tyburn; her story was told in a pamphlet by Henry Goodcole, and in a 1621 play entitled The Witch of Edmonton.

The historic All Saints' Church is in Church Street as is Lamb's Cottage, which was home to writers Charles Lamb and Mary Lamb.

John Keats, the poet, was apprenticed to surgeon Dr. Hammond in Church Street between 1810 and 1816. The house was demolished in 1931 to be replaced by Keats Parade. An extant shop carries a blue plaque in commemoration.

Edmonton was the home town of Sir James Winter Lake, director of the Hudson's Bay Company. The company's trading outpost named after Edmonton is now the capital of the Canadian province of Alberta.

=== The Diverting History of John Gilpin ===
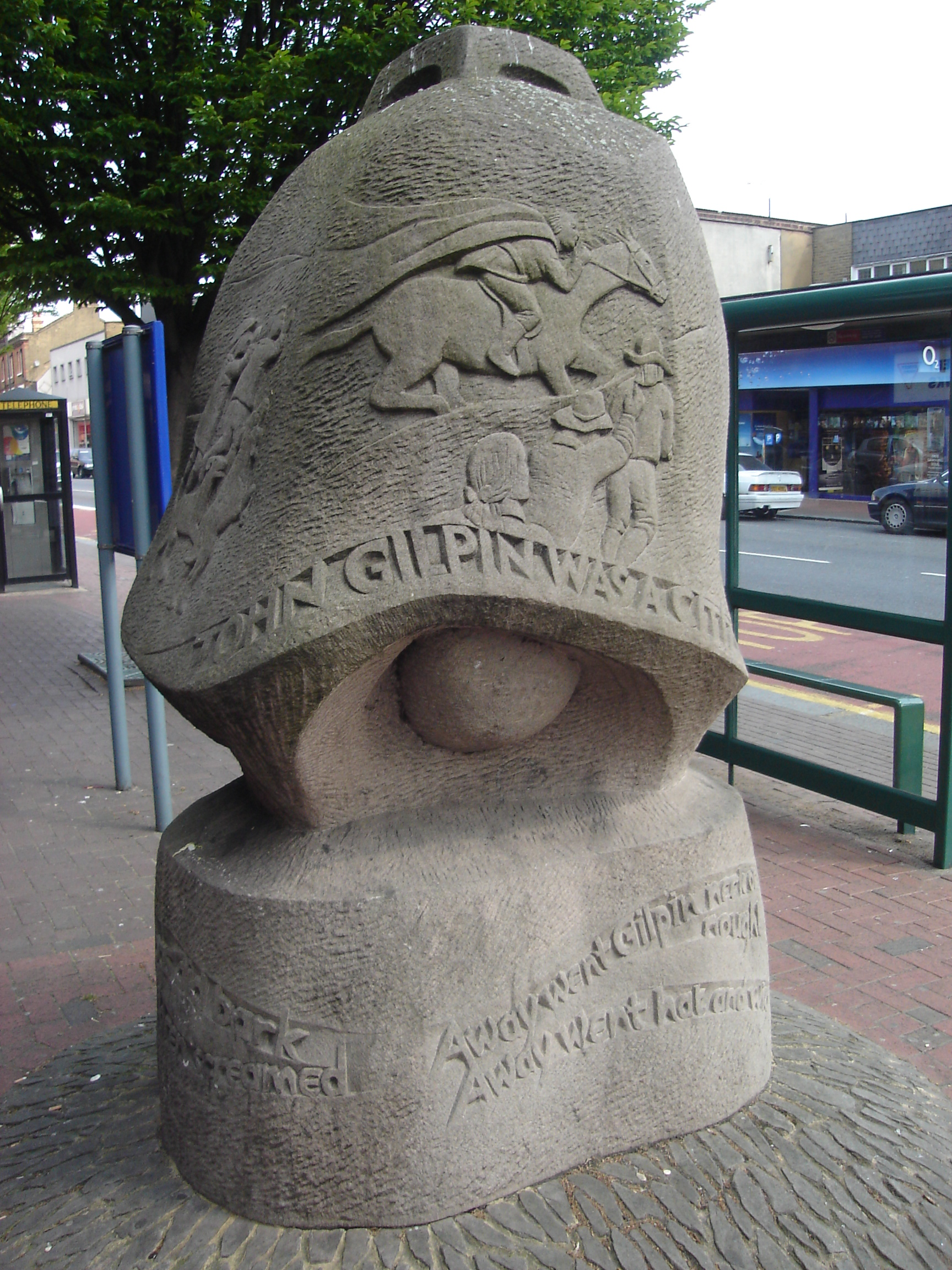
The statue of Gilpin's Bell at Fore Street

In his 1782 poem, The Diverting History of John Gilpin, William Cowper relates the comic tale of John Gilpin a linen draper of Cheapside London, who was probably based on a Mr Beyer, a linen draper of the Cheapside corner of Paternoster Row.

Gilpin's spouse decides she and her husband should spend their twentieth wedding anniversary at The Bell Inn, Fore Street, Edmonton. The journey is beset with misfortune from start to finish. Gilpin loses control of his horse which carries him on to the town of Ware ten miles (16 km) distant. On the return journey, Gilpin is still unable to handle his steed, as he once again he fails to stop at The Bell. The horse gallops back to Cheapside much to the dismay of his concerned spouse.

Gilpin is remembered in Edmonton by the statue at Fore Street, the ex-Wetherspoons outlet the Gilpin's Bell public house opposite the site of the original inn and the 1950s council housing Gilpin House in Upper Fore Street.

=== Industry ===
Edmonton was home to many industries which included manufacturing of gas appliances, electrical components and furniture. Most of this was lost in the latter part of the twentieth century. Household names that produced goods here included MK electric, Ever Ready batteries, British Oxygen, Glover and Main gas appliances.

Eley Industrial Estate was named after Eley Brothers the firearms cartridge manufacturer. Its shot tower was a distinctive landmark on the skyline until being demolished the late twentieth century. Due to its close proximity to the River Lee Navigation, timber was transported by barge from the London Docks and stored in riverside wharves. As a result, many furniture makers including Nathans, Beautility and Homeworthy established factories. Today, Parker-Knoll products are manufactured at the former B&I Nathan factory on the Eley Industrial Estate. As of 2013, the area is dominated by the 100 metre Edmonton Incinerator chimney which was built in 1971. Other major employers include Coca-Cola.

=== Railway and transport ===
The railway arrived in 1840 with the opening of the first section of the Lea Valley Line from Stratford to Broxbourne. A station was provided in Water Lane (Angel Road). As the station was badly sited and the trains were slow and expensive, few people used the railway in the early days, preferring the horse buses. In 1845 there were buses every 15 minutes along Fore Street, travelling alternately to Bishopsgate and Holborn.

The single-track line from a junction just north of Angel Road to Enfield Town opened on 1 March 1849, with an intermediate single-platform station at Lower Edmonton, on the edge of the village green. The service was infrequent and often required a change of train at the junction. This, coupled with the train taking the long way round through Stratford to get to the terminus at Bishopsgate, meant that the railway offered little competition to the existing horse coaches and buses.

Edmonton's population grew with the opening of the high level railway at Edmonton Green station in 1872. The traffic produced by the railway, and by a tramway opened by the North London Tramways Company in 1881, brought a working class population to Lower Edmonton and encouraged housing development and the development of Edmonton Green's outdoor market. This had always been the major centre for the village, but by the early 20th century its character had changed to a busy, raucous Cockney centre, alive with costermongers barrows and food stalls, the venue for travelling circuses and fairs. On several occasions the local council tried unsuccessfully to close down the market.

The direct line from London to Enfield Town was opened in four stages, from Bethnal Green to Stoke Newington on 27 May 1872; from Stoke Newington through to Lower Edmonton High Level on 22 July 1872, with stations in Edmonton at Silver Street and a new High Level station at Lower Edmonton, which was renamed Edmonton Green in 1992; the short section from Lower Edmonton High Level to Edmonton Junction (where the new line met the original Eastern Counties Railway route from Angel Road to Enfield Town via Lower Edmonton Low Level) on 1 August 1872; and the suburban platforms on the west side of Liverpool Street station on 2 February 1874.

The stations were well sited and offered exceptionally cheap workmen's fares of just 2d on trains arriving at Liverpool Street prior to 07:00, 3d on those arriving between 07:00 and 07:30, and half-price returns on those arriving between 07:30 and 08:00. A horse tramway along Fore Street opened in 1881. The tramway was re-constructed and electrified during 1905, lasting until 1938 when trolley buses took over.

=== Contemporary Edmonton ===
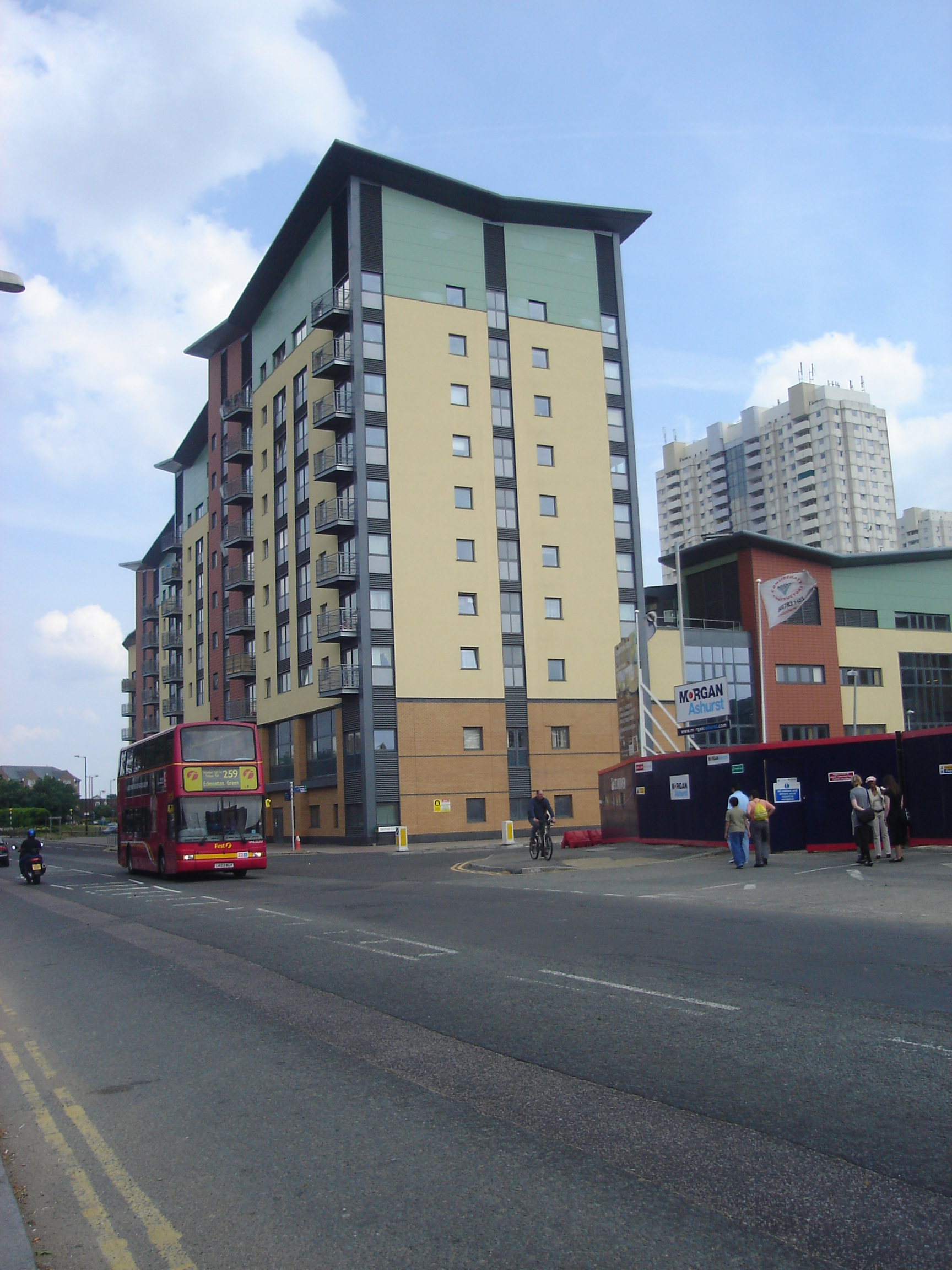
New housing and leisure centre (completed 2007)

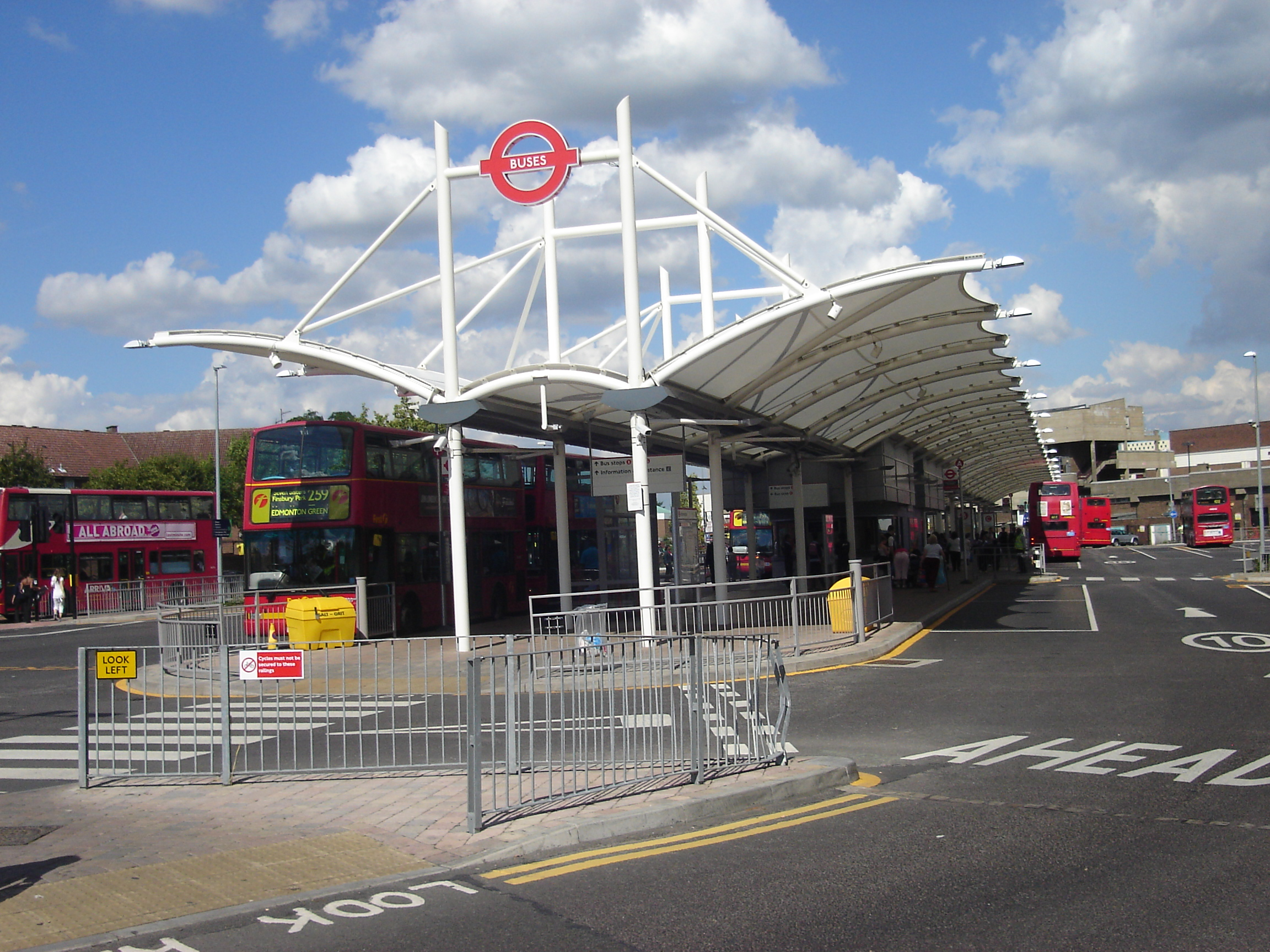
Edmonton Green bus station (completed 2007)

By the 1930s, the area had become a major shopping destination drawing visitors from a wide catchment area. The early post war years saw much of the area in a run-down state. There was also an acute housing shortage. Comprehensive redevelopment of the area was agreed in 1960, to a plan by Frederick Gibberd & Partners for a radically transformed urban centre with a pedestrian shopping area, car parking for 3000, 750 flats including three 25-storey tower blocks (Grampian House, Mendip House and Pennine House) and new civic and amenity buildings to replace the old town hall and baths. When Edmonton was incorporated within the new London Borough of Enfield in 1965, plans for the civic buildings were abandoned. Only the leisure centre (demolished 2007, set in a car park) was completed. Building began on the redevelopment in 1965 and completed in 1974.

In the early 21st century, Edmonton changed from a predominantly white area into one of the most ethnically diverse areas in England as a result of increased immigration. At the 2001 census, 66.1% of the population of the Edmonton constituency was white, whereas at the 2011 census, between 36 and 38 per cent of the town's three electoral wards was white.

On 10 February 2005, retailer IKEA opened its Tottenham store on Meridian Way, Edmonton.

The Edmonton Green area was redeveloped by St. Modwen Properties in a £100 million project which included new housing, a bus station, a Travelodge hotel and refurbishment of the shopping centre. St. Modwen had bought the property from the London Borough of Enfield in 1999. Phase 1 was completed in 2007 and includes a primary health care centre, 176 affordable residential units, bus station, hotel, leisure centre, new retail outlets and the refurbishment of the existing multi-storey car park. Demolition of the 1970s leisure centre enabled construction to commence of a new Asda supermarket which opened in November 2008.

The then Mayor of London, Boris Johnson, visited Edmonton in November 2008 to release his Time For Action plan. He claimed his proposals would help stop young people becoming repeat offenders.

Edmonton has had some of the highest levels of unemployment in Britain, with the recession of the late 2000s pushing unemployment to nearly 14% by 2009.

On 18 June 2011 over 400 people marched through Edmonton to make a stand against gun and knife crime.

As part of the 2012 Summer Olympics preparations, the Olympic torch relay passed through Edmonton on 25 July 2012 at Fore Street en route to Haringey.

Up to 5,000 new homes and 3,000 new jobs will be created by the £1.5 billion Meridian Water redevelopment on former industrial land by 2026.

== Demography ==
=== 2001 Census ===
The Edmonton constituency had a population of 96,493 in the 2001 census.

The white groups made up 66.1% of the population and thirteen other ethnic groups the remainder.

=== 2011 census ===
- Edmonton Green ward: 38% White British/Other White, 30% Black British/African/Caribbean.
- Upper Edmonton ward: 41% White British/Other White, 35% Black British/African/Caribbean.
- Lower Edmonton ward: 38% White British/Other White, 28% Black British/African/Caribbean.

The most spoken foreign language in all three wards is Turkish.

The median house price as of 2014 in the Edmonton Green ward was £210,000. This is the 15th lowest out of the 628 wards of Greater London.

== Sites or buildings of historic interest ==
All Saints' Church

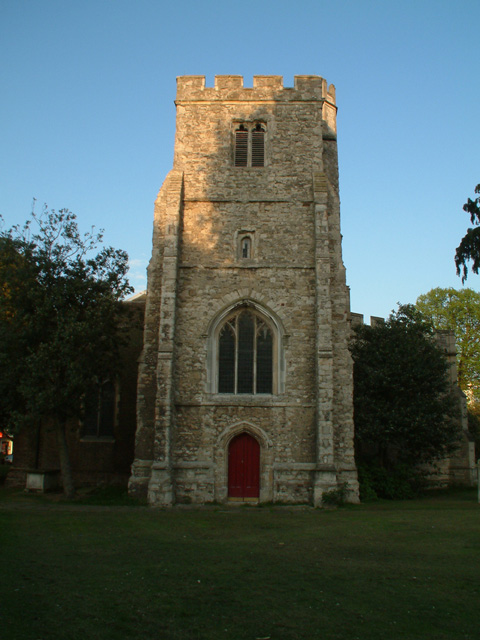

The mostly 15th-century church is located in Church Street. It is the oldest building in Edmonton.

=== Angel Place ===
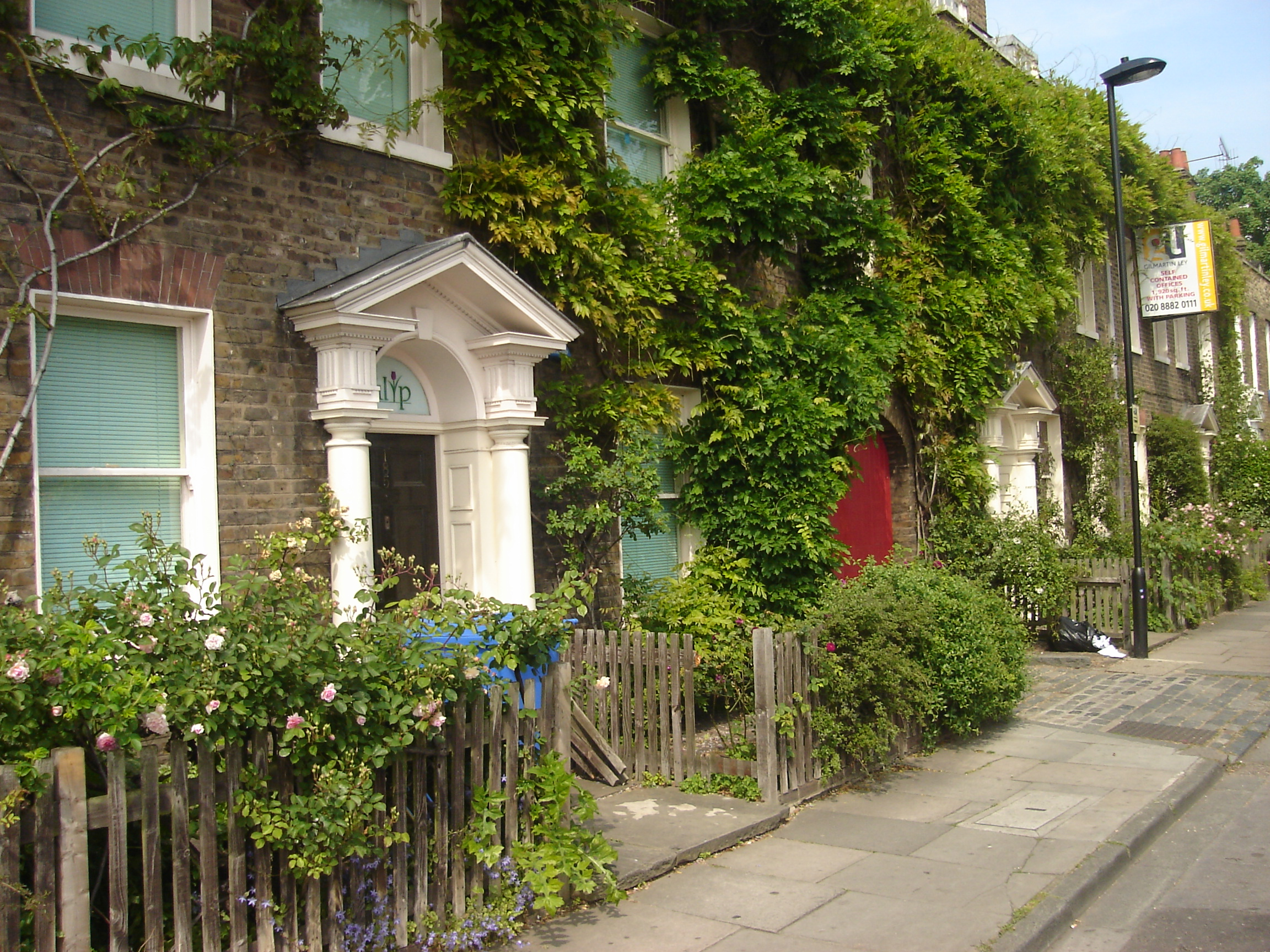

A circa 1730 terrace of linked Grade II* Listed Buildings which were altered in the middle of the 19th century. 185, 187 and 189 were extensively restored in the 1980s to include the formation of an arch at 187 Angel Place with prize-winning gardens behind. Set back from Fore Street, the A1010 road, and standing close to the junction with the A406 road, the buildings were adjacent to The Angel public house demolished to widen the North Circular Road.

=== Charles Lamb Institute ===
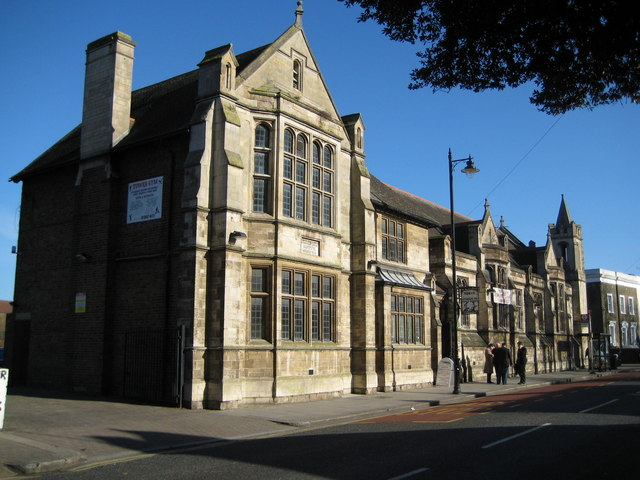

The Grade II listed building is located in Church Street. Designed by J. S. Alder and opened in 1908. The building today is used as a church.

=== Edmonton Central Library ===
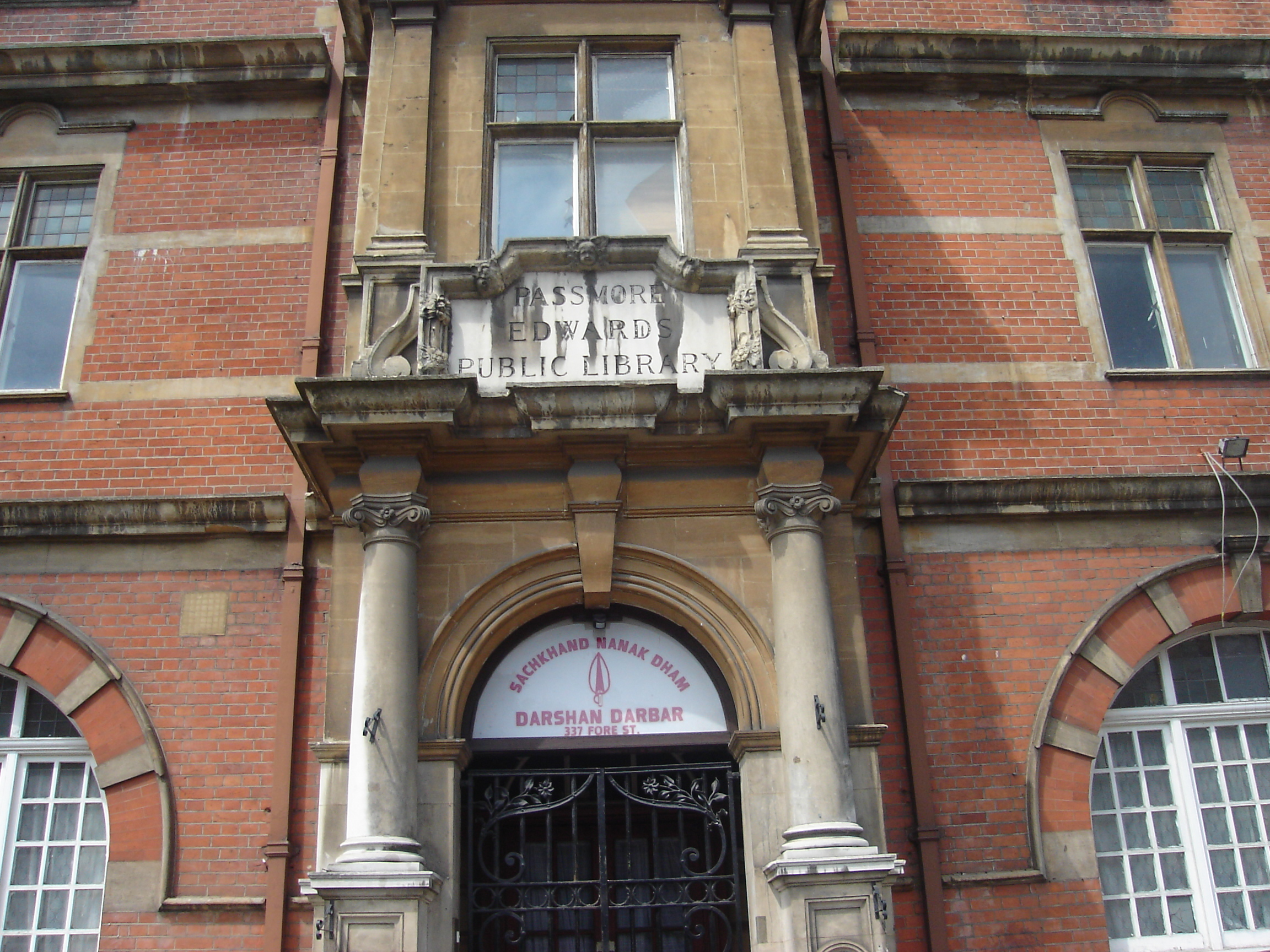

The former public library (closed 1991) opened in 1897 at Fore Street. Designed by Maurice Bingham Adams with bequests provided by the John Passmore Edwards foundation. Today the Grade II listed building is used as a religious and community centre. (Inside the library by the main entrance were two portrait plaques of Charles Lamb and John Keats by George Frampton, 1908. The plaques can be viewed at (Community House, 313 Fore Street, Edmonton).

=== Edmonton Federation Cemetery ===
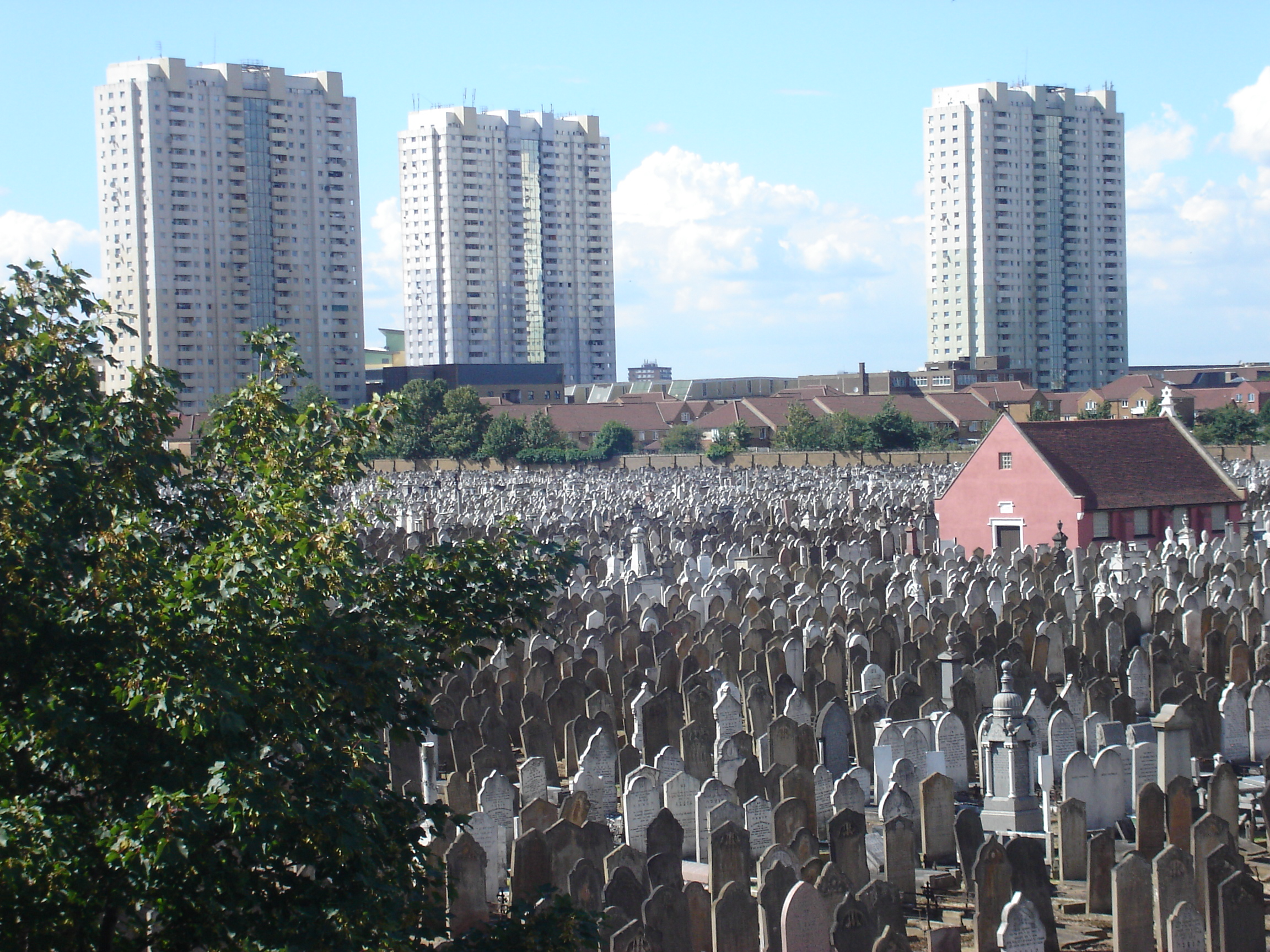

The roughly triangular shaped Jewish cemetery was founded in 1889 with land given by Samuel Montagu. The walled cemetery is bordered by Salmons Brook which forms part of the Pymmes Brook Trail and a footpath which follows the course of the disused Lower Edmonton low level railway. Rabbi Eliezer Gordon is buried here. The cemetery contains the war graves of 7 Commonwealth service personnel of the First World War and 23 of the Second World War. The entrance is in Montagu Road B137 road. The site also incorporates the Western Synagogue Cemetery founded in 1884 (containing 3 Commonwealth service war graves of World War II) and adjoins the Tottenham Park Cemetery.

=== Edmonton Girls' Charity School ===
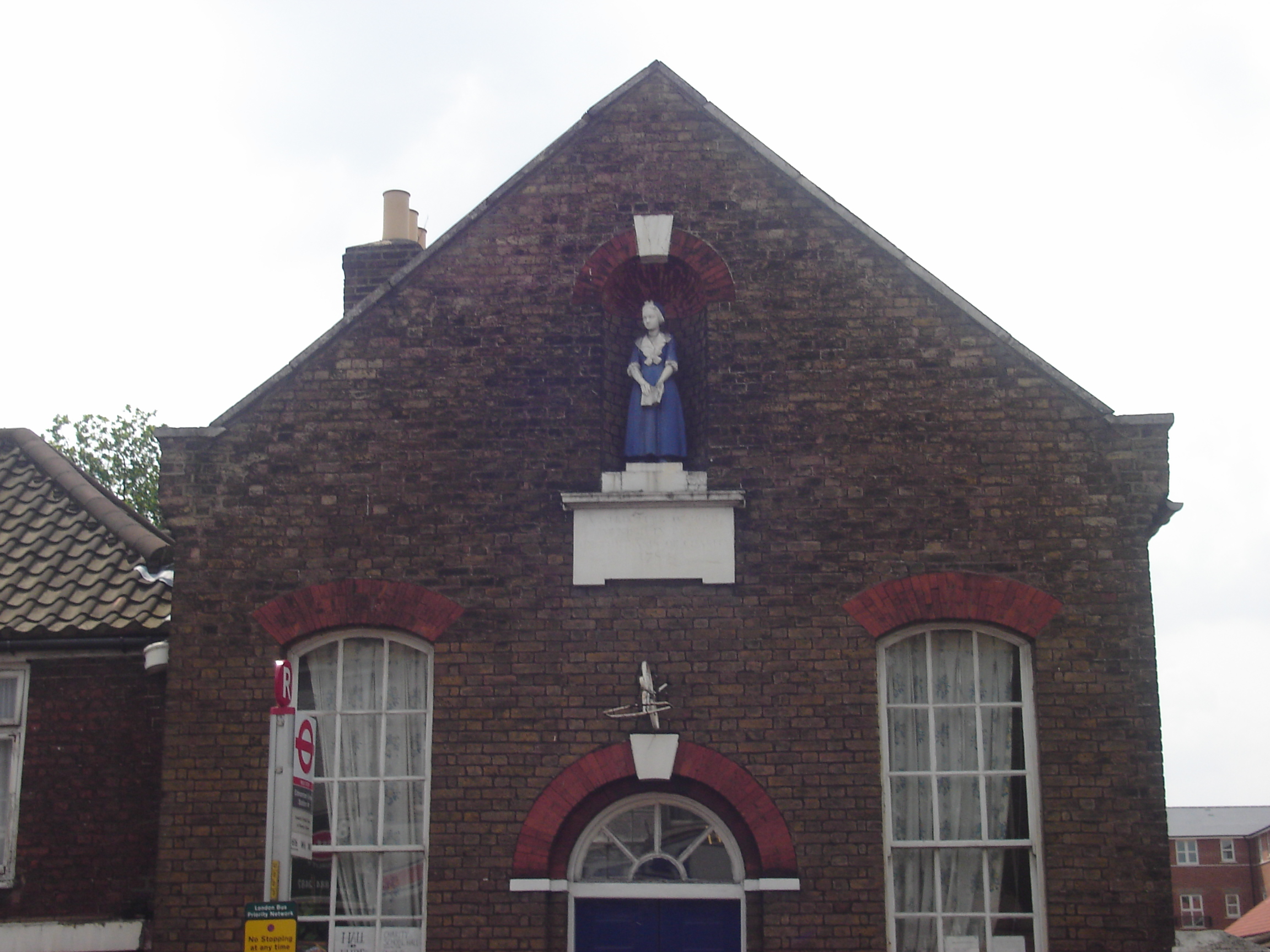

The simple yellow brick structure with red brick dressings is located on the south side of Church Street. Initially the school, founded in 1784, had been on a different site. However, the benefactor, Obadiah Legrew, grew tired of the children close to his home. He had the original school demolished, drew £170 from the trust, and purchased another plot of land. In 1793 the new school was built afresh, away from his delicate ears. Pupils aged between 7 and 14 were clothed and educated, although the main purpose was to fit them for domestic service. The facade carries a figure of a charity girl and the words A structure of Hope founded in Faith on the basis of Charity. The school closed in 1904.

=== Lamb's Cottage ===
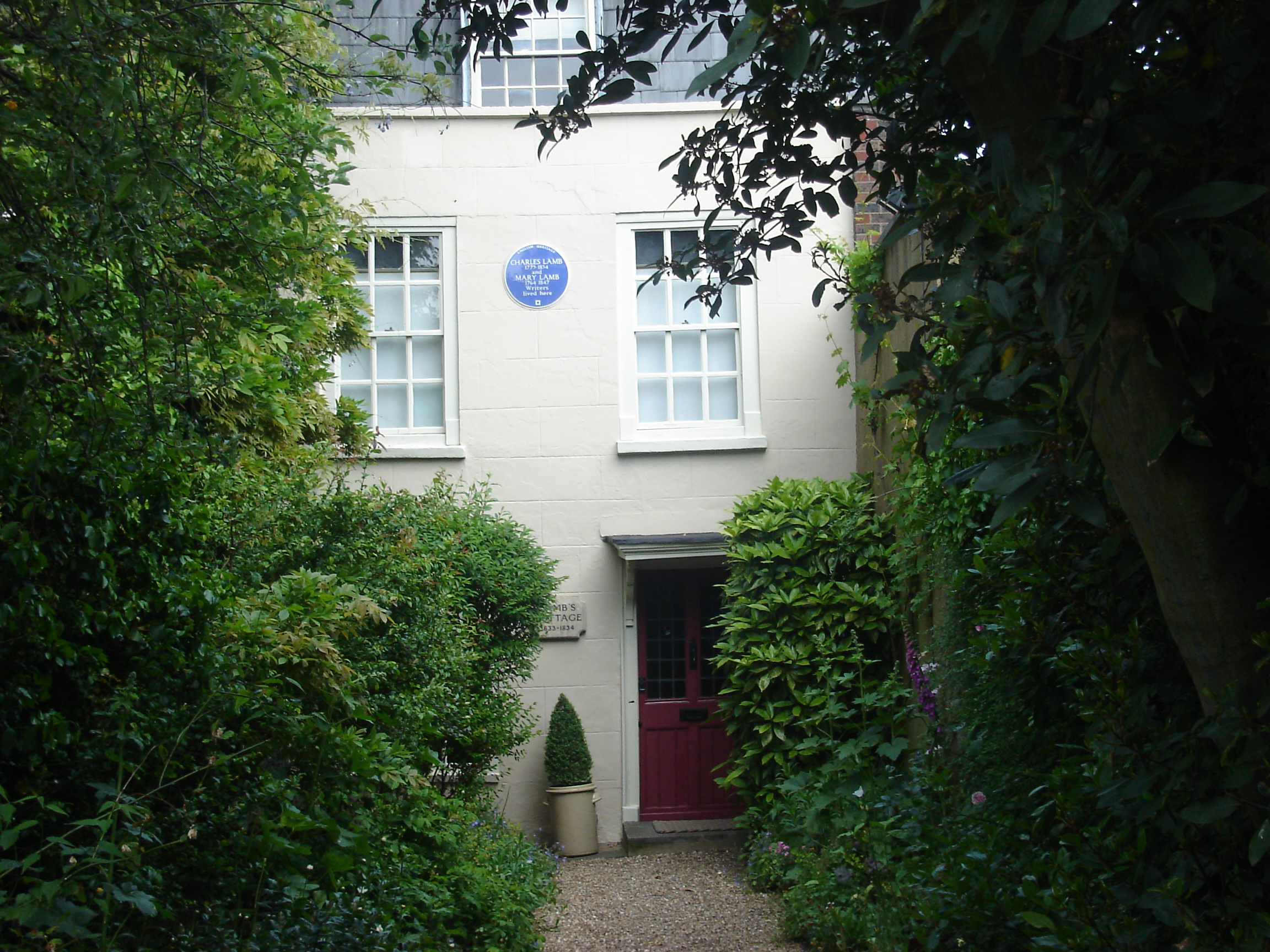

Formerly known as Bay Cottage. The cottage is believed to have been built in the 1680s and is located in the Church Street conservation area. Writers Charles and Mary Lamb occupied the house from 1833 to 1834, when Charles Lamb died there. The cottage was sold to its new owners in June 2008.

=== Millfield House ===
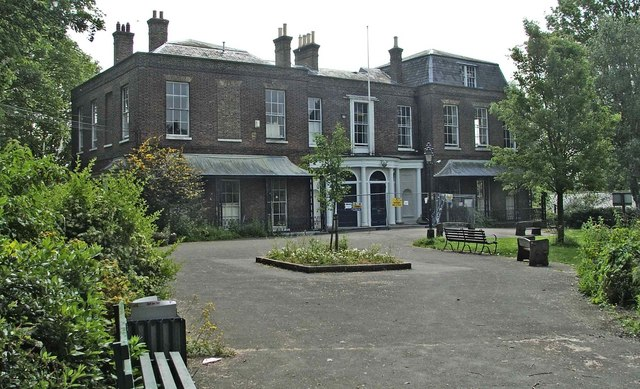

Millfield House is late-18th-century house used as a workhouse school, hospital and a refugee centre before closing in 1971. The house re-opened as an arts centre in 1979 in a complex which encompasses the Millfield Theatre, Millfield Arts Centre and the former Weir Hall Library (closed 2008).

=== North Middlesex Hospital ===
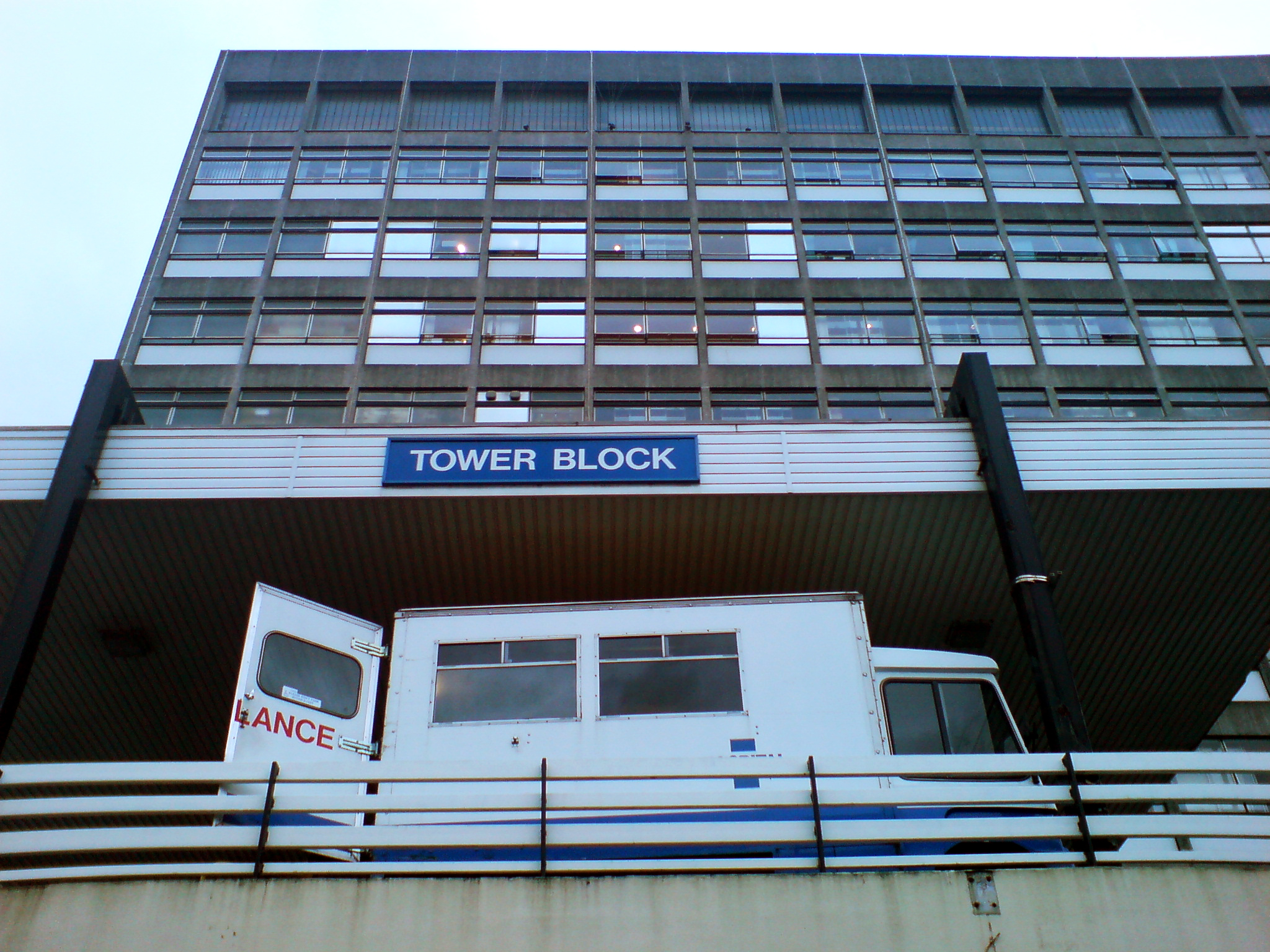

North Middlesex Hospital is located in Sterling Way, Upper Edmonton. Built in 1842 by the Edmonton Board of Guardians as the Edmonton Union Workhouse. A separate infirmary block was opened in 1910. Much of the building was taken over for use as a military hospital in 1915, during the First World War, was returned to civilian use in 1920 and renamed the North Middlesex Hospital.

=== Salisbury House ===
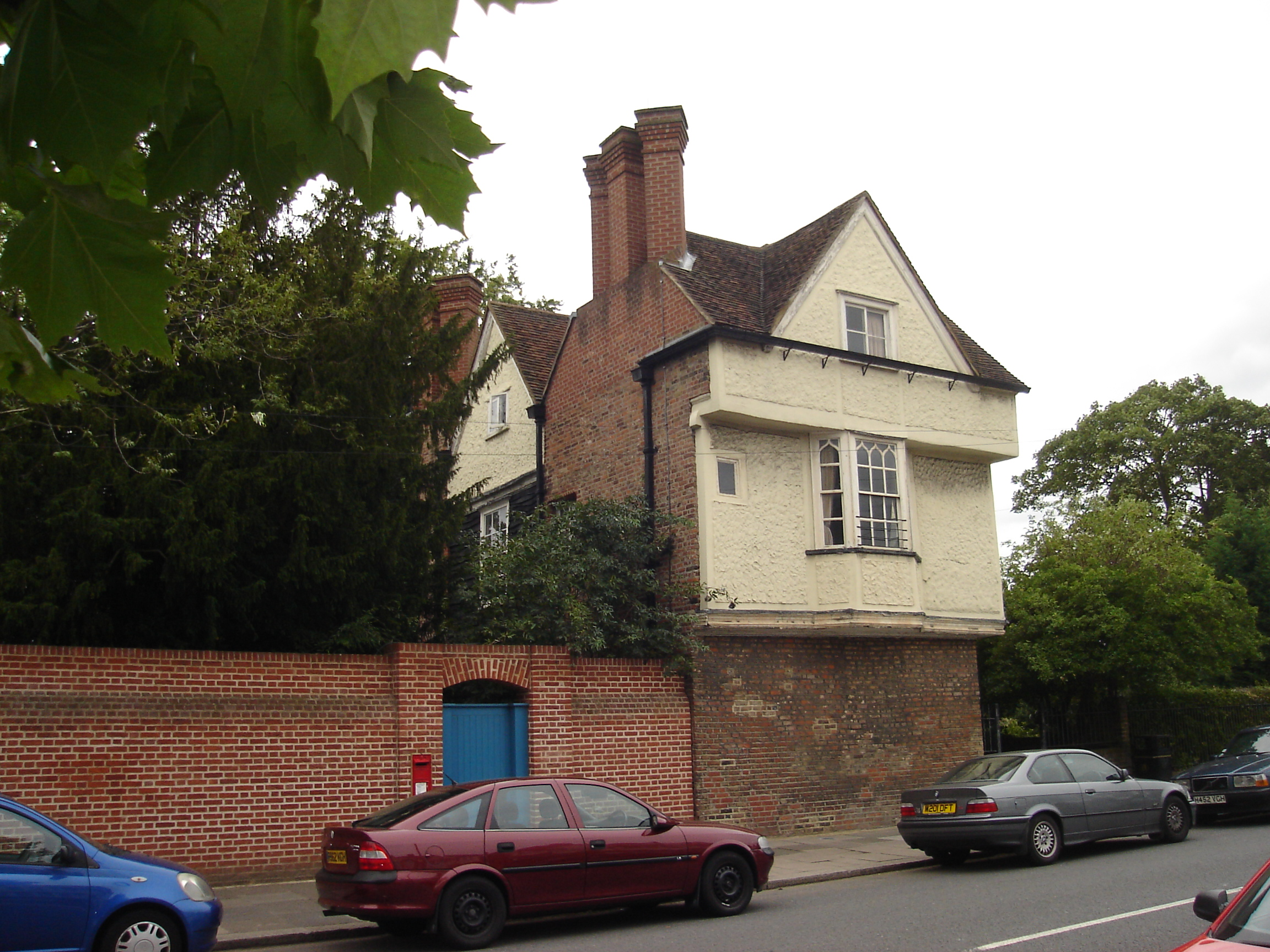

Salisbury House in Bury Street West, Lower Edmonton dates from the late 16th/early 17th century, and is the oldest building in Edmonton apart from All Saints' Church. The house was a private residence and then a school before it was bought by Edmonton council in 1936. The building was established as an arts centre in 1957 (the first to be provided by a local authority in London). In 1992 it underwent a major restoration. The house is Grade II listed along with some of the surrounding walls.

=== The Crescent ===
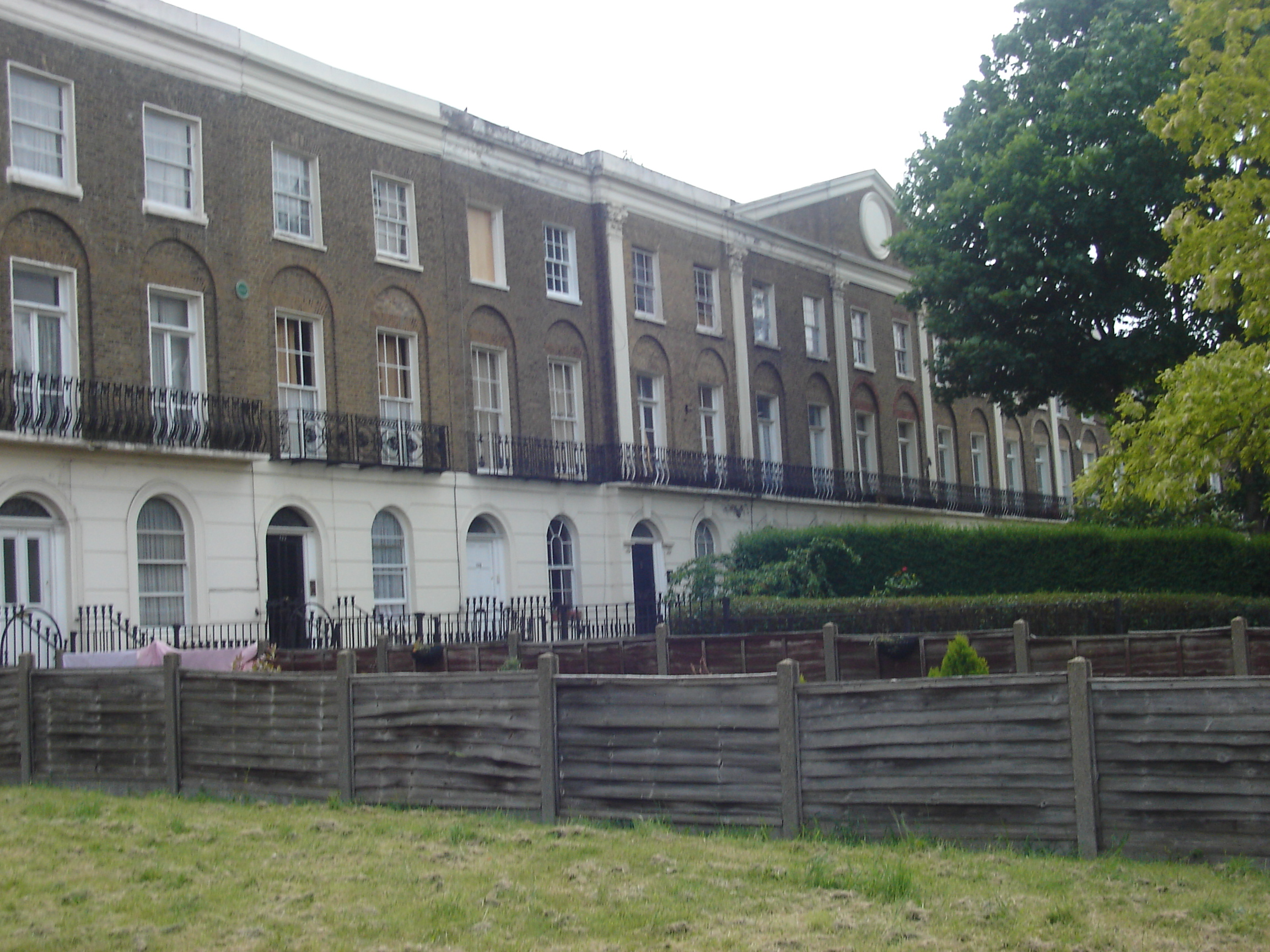

A terrace of twenty-five Georgian houses in the Hertford Road, built between 1826 and 1851 by a London solicitor. By the late 19th century the properties in the Crescent had been largely split into flats.

== Infrastructure ==
- Deephams Sewage Treatment Works is near Picketts Lock
- Edmonton Incinerator the largest incinerator in the UK
- William Girling Reservoir is one of the reservoirs in the Lee Valley Reservoir Chain

== Places of worship ==
- All Saints' Church. A mainly 15th-century church located in Church Street.
- Edmonton Baptist Church. Located close to Edmonton Green, a short walk from Edmonton railway station. Built in 1976.
- Edmonton Methodist Church. Located at 300 Fore Street, on the corner of Brettenham Road. There has been a Methodist church in Edmonton since the 19th century. The main part of the current building was erected in 1927.
- Edmonton Salvation Army. Located on Fore Street and was opened in 1889. It was rebuilt in 1993 after part of the original building fell into disrepair.
- Edmonton Temple - Jesus Mission to Nations Ministries, Located in Grove Street.
- Mevlana Rumi Mosque. Located in Fore Street and opened in 2008 by the followers of Fethullah Gulen.
- St Aldhelm's Church is located in Silver Street Upper Edmonton. Built in 1903 and designed by William Douglas Caroe.
- St Alphege's Church. Was erected in 1958 and designed by Sir Edward Maufe. The church can be found at the junction of the Hertford Road and Galliard Road.
- St Edmund's RC Church. Built between 1905 and 1907. The church is on the junction of the Hertford Road and Croyland Road. The School is on the junction of Hertford Road and Bounces Road, facing each other across Hertford Road.
- St. Mary with St. John's Church. Located on Dyson's Road, close to the North Circular Road (A406), the church was built in 1906 together with a church hall and vicarage.
- Saint Demetrios Greek Orthodox Church. Located on the junction of Town Road and Logan Road. Greek Orthodox since 1977, formerly the Anglican Church of St. Martin. The Church was built in 1909 and consecrated in 1911.
- Silver Street Community Church. Located in Statham Grove, N18. Started in 2015 in partnership with Enfield Evangelical Free Church

== Shopping ==
The main retail centre of Edmonton is the Edmonton Green Shopping Centre which has a market, and the other retail centre is at the "Angel" Edmonton which is a high street containing a wide range of retail outlets.

== Politics ==
The Member of Parliament for Edmonton and Winchmore Hill is Kate Osamor, Labour Co-op who was elected to the Edmonton constituency at the 2015 general election.

== Leisure and recreation ==
- Edmonton Cricket Club was founded in 1872 and is in Church Street. The ground is also home to the Norsemen Football club.
- Edmonton Leisure Centre at Edmonton Green opened in August 2007. Facilities include a swimming pool and sports hall.
- Lee Valley Leisure Complex at Picketts Lock is part of the Lee Valley Park.
- Pymmes Brook Trail crosses Edmonton to join the Lea Valley Walk at Pickett's Lock on the River Lee Navigation.
- Angling is allowed upstream and downstream of Picketts Lock. Information from the River Lea Anglers Club.
- The River Lee Navigation's towpath forms part of National Cycle Route 1 and the Lea Valley Walk.

=== Parks, gardens and open spaces ===
- Bury Lodge Gardens. The gardens are in Bury Street West. Built on land belonging to Bury Lodge house (demolished 1935) and the nearby Salisbury House. The ornamental garden includes brick pillared pergolas, rose gardens and a pond. Other facilities are a playing field. The southern boundary of the park is bordered by Salmons Brook.
- Church Street Recreation Ground. The recreation ground is close to the A10 in Lower Edmonton. The grounds facilities include playing fields and children's play area. The site is the home to London's only complete Second World War Civil Defence Centre.
- Craig Park TQ3448092570. The park is in Upper Edmonton and lies close to Angel Road A406. Facilities include sports pitches, children's play area and hard court.
- Jubilee Park. Covering 37 acres (150,000 m^{2}) of land previously used for brick-making. The park opened on 24 June 1939 to commemorate King George V Silver Jubilee in 1935. Facilities include the Henry Barrass Stadium, formal gardens, pitch and putt, sports pitches, tennis courts and wildlife area.
- Montagu Road Recreation Ground TQ3511193199 on Montagu Road B137. Facilities include playing fields, children's play area and hard courts.
- Plevna Road Open Space. Open space close to Edmonton Green.
- Pymmes Park. This historic park is located in Upper Edmonton and borders the North Circular Road.
- Tatem Park and Hollywood Gardens. The park and the gardens opened in 1938 and were built on a former gravel pit which belonged to the Tatem sisters, who donated the site to Edmonton Borough Council in the 1930s for use as a public park. The gardens are named after Alderman Hollywood, former mayor of Edmonton. The ornamental gardens occupy a triangle between two main roads A10 and the A111. In 1983 a nature area was created with the accent on wildlife conservation.

== Theatre and the arts ==
Edmonton is the home of the Millfield Arts Centre and Face Front Inclusive Theatre Company.

== Popular culture ==
- In an episode of the BBC comedy Some Mothers Do 'Ave 'Em, Frank Spencer (played by Michael Crawford) roller skates down the now-demolished bridge at Edmonton Green, and in the same episode he skates at the indoor rink at the now-demolished Picketts Lock Centre.
- The Empire Music Hall was the venue for Marie Lloyd's last stage performance in 1922. She was taken ill on stage and died several days later.
- Side two of A Step Further by Savoy Brown was recorded live at the Cook's Ferry Inn on 12 May 1969 in Edmonton.
- The video for the Lostprophets song "Shinobi vs. Dragon Ninja" was filmed in a car park at Edmonton Green.
- Local musical duo Chas & Dave recorded a song titled "Edmonton Green" lamenting the changes that have occurred there.
- In the BBC and later ITV situation comedy Birds of a Feather. Pauline Quirke's character Sharon Theodopolopodous and her husband Chris originally lived in a council flat in Edmonton.
- In Harold Pinter's The Birthday Party, there is a reference to Stanley having played a “world-class” concert in Lower Edmonton.

== Watercourses ==
- River Lee Diversion
- River Lee Navigation
- Pymmes Brook
- Salmons Brook
- The Overflow Channel TQ3622492939 flows along the western perimeter of the William Girling reservoir to merge with the River Lee diversion, close to the Lea Valley Viaduct.
- Saddlers Mill Stream 51.622°N 0.0485°W culverted throughout much of its course and flowing mostly underground. The stream was diverted in the early 21st century to alleviate flooding close to where it merges with Salmons Brook at Montagu Road.

== Nearest places ==
- Tottenham to the south
- Palmers Green to the west
- Chingford to the east
- Ponders End to the north
- Winchmore Hill to the west

== Railway stations ==
- Edmonton Green railway station
- Silver Street railway station
- Meridian Water railway station
