= Lower Edmonton (low level) railway station =

Former railway station in England

Lower Edmonton Low Level
- Interactive map of Lower Edmonton Low Level

General information
- Location: Edmonton
- Local authority: Enfield
- Grid reference: TQ 3435 9365
- Number of platforms: 2

Railway companies
- Original company: Eastern Counties Railway
- Pre-grouping: Great Eastern Railway
- Post-grouping: London and North Eastern Railway

Key dates
- 1 March 1849: Opened as Edmonton
- 22 July 1872: Renamed Edmonton Low Level
- 1 July 1883: Renamed Lower Edmonton Low Level
- 11 September 1939: Closed

Other information
- Coordinates: 51.6252°N 0.0604°W

Lower Edmonton (low level) railway station was a station in Edmonton, London opened in 1849 by the Eastern Counties Railway as part of the original Enfield Town branch line. Originally named Edmonton it was renamed as Lower Edmonton low level to distinguish it from neighbouring Lower Edmonton high level. It closed to passengers in 1939 although the line on which it stood lasted until 1964.

== History ==
=== Eastern Counties Railway (1849-1862) ===
Enfield had been missed by the Northern and Eastern Railway line which had opened between Stratford and Broxbourne on 15 September 1840 and had to make do with Ponders End station some 2 miles (3.2 km) away. Local pressure led to the deposit of a bill before Parliament in 1844 which failed. Two years later the Enfield and Edmonton Railway Act 1846 (9 & 10 Vict. c. ccclvii) was passed with arrangements for the Eastern Counties Railway to take over management of the project. (Note: The Northern and Eastern had at this time been leased to the ECR.)

Work on the 3 miles 7 chains (5.0 km) single line branch commenced in 1848 under the direction of contractor Thomas Earle. The Enfield Town branch line branched off the Eastern Counties Railway (ECR) line at the former Angel Road railway station, which was called Edmonton at that time. After the branch opened on 1 March 1849 the original Edmonton station was renamed Water Lane and the new intermediate station on the branch was named Edmonton. The ECR at that point ran between London Shoreditch (Bishopsgate) and Bishops Stortford although plans were afoot to extend northwards to Cambridge.

By the 1860s the railways in East Anglia were in financial trouble, and most were leased to the Eastern Counties Railway. Although they wished to amalgamate formally, they could not obtain government agreement for this until 1862, when the Great Eastern Railway (GER) was formed by amalgamation.

=== Great Eastern Railway (1862-1922) ===
The branch continued operation although dissatisfaction grew with the roundabout route the branch line service took to get into London. As a result, a more direct route was opened in stages between Hackney Downs being finally connected to the Enfield Town branch on 1 August 1872. The line between the new junction and Enfield Town was also doubled providing a double-tracked route to Liverpool Street. This offered a quicker journey time into London Liverpool Street and this effectively became the Enfield Town branch.

The original route thence declined in importance from this date and it was at this time the station was renamed Lower Edmonton (Low Level). By law the GER was required to run a number of cheap workmen's trains to the city and these generally operated between Liverpool Street and Lower Edmonton (Low Level) via Stratford or Clapton.

Despite having a limited train service an additional platform was built south of the existing platform so that the level crossing at the south end of the original platform could remain open. In 1900 a goods yard was built between the Low and High Level stations accessible from the Lower Edmonton (Low Level) line and these six sidings were also used to stable empty coaching stock trains. A small signal box was located near the level crossing that separated the two platforms.

In 1908 there were five trains each way between Liverpool Street and the station.

During the First World War the station was used by ambulance trains to unload wounded soldiers for onward transport to Edmonton Military Hospital (now North Middlesex Hospital. At this time the Lea Valley was the centre of the munitions industry and the government called on the GER to restore passenger services to the Southbury Loop. The service started operating to the original stations on 1 March 1915 and to Carterhatch Lane Halt on 4 July 1916. but once the war finished demand again fell off and services were withdrawn on 1 July 1919. Most of the services terminated at the northerly platform and passengers changed to Liverpool Street trains at the high-level station.

By 1919 employment patterns were changing with the growth of industry in the Lea Valley and usage of the trains declined.

The GER became part of the London & North Eastern Railway at the 1923 grouping.

=== London and North Eastern Railway (1923-1947) ===
The route through the station was used by goods trains serving Enfield Town and the goods yards on the Southbury Loop. The number of workmen's trains declined and by 1931 the last morning service had been withdrawn. The evening service lasted until 8 September 1939 when it too was discontinued (no doubt as a wartime economy measure).

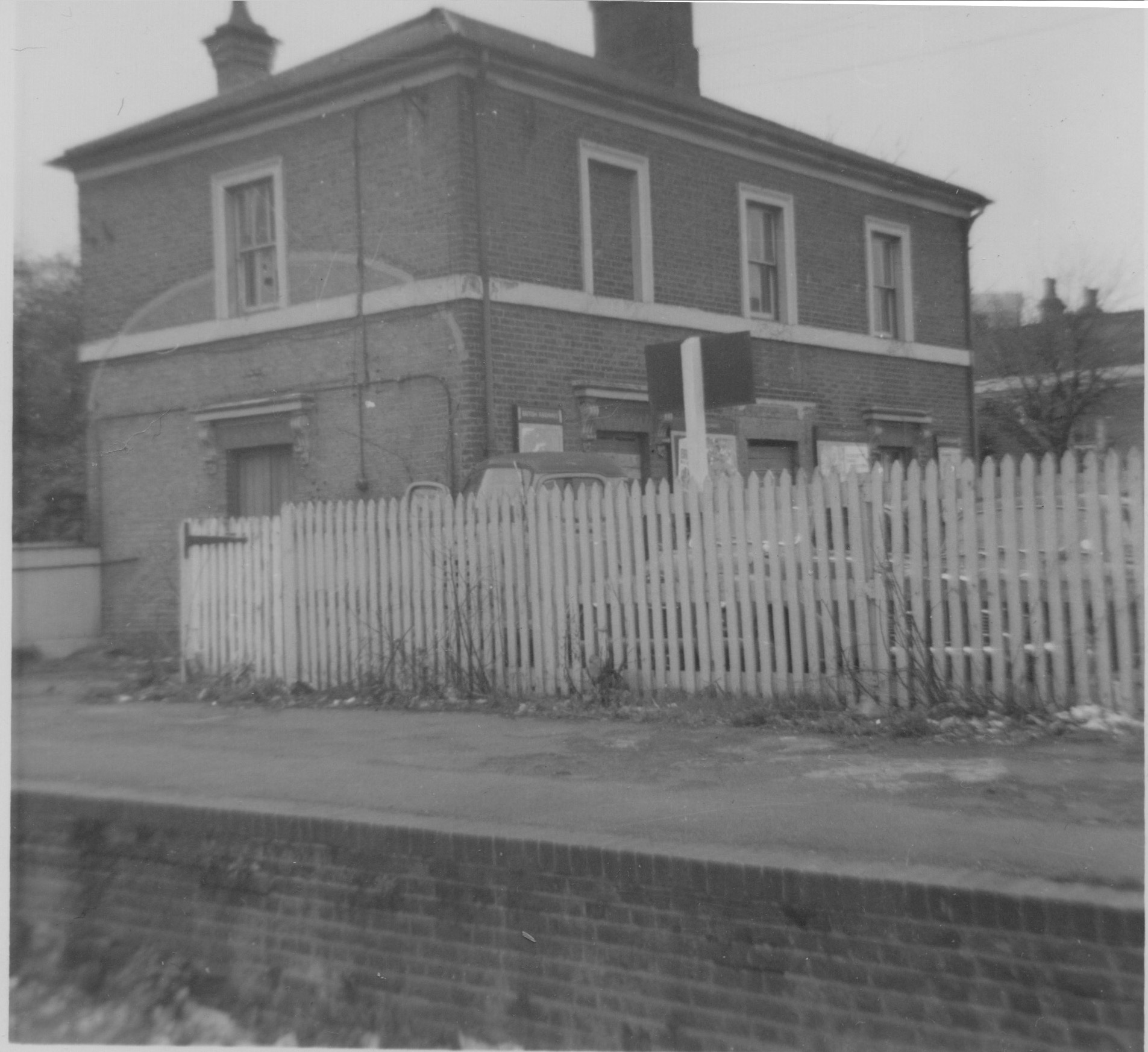
Edmonton Low Level station building, England, circa 1966

=== British Railways (1948-1964) ===
Britain's railways were nationalised on 1 January 1948 with the Enfield Town branch becoming part of British Railways Eastern Region.

During 1959 Lower Edmonton (low level) railway station was temporarily re-opened and the line used for services which had been diverted due to electrification works on the West Anglia Main Line.

The line was finally closed in 1964. Since closure, the spur it once stood on has also been closed and built on and Edmonton Green Shopping Centre now sits on the former site of the platforms.

The high-level station still stands, today known as Edmonton Green.

== Former Services ==
Preceding station	Disused railways	Following station
Angel Road	Eastern Counties Railway; Southbury Loop	Southbury
Angel Road	Eastern Counties Railway; Enfield Town branch	Enfield Town
