= Building BloQs =

Hackerspace in London, England

Coordinates: 51.6083°N 0.0396°W

- Formation: 2012
- Location: London, UK
- Founders: Al Parra, Arnaud Nichols, Avninder Nanray, Julien Thomasset
- Website: Homepage

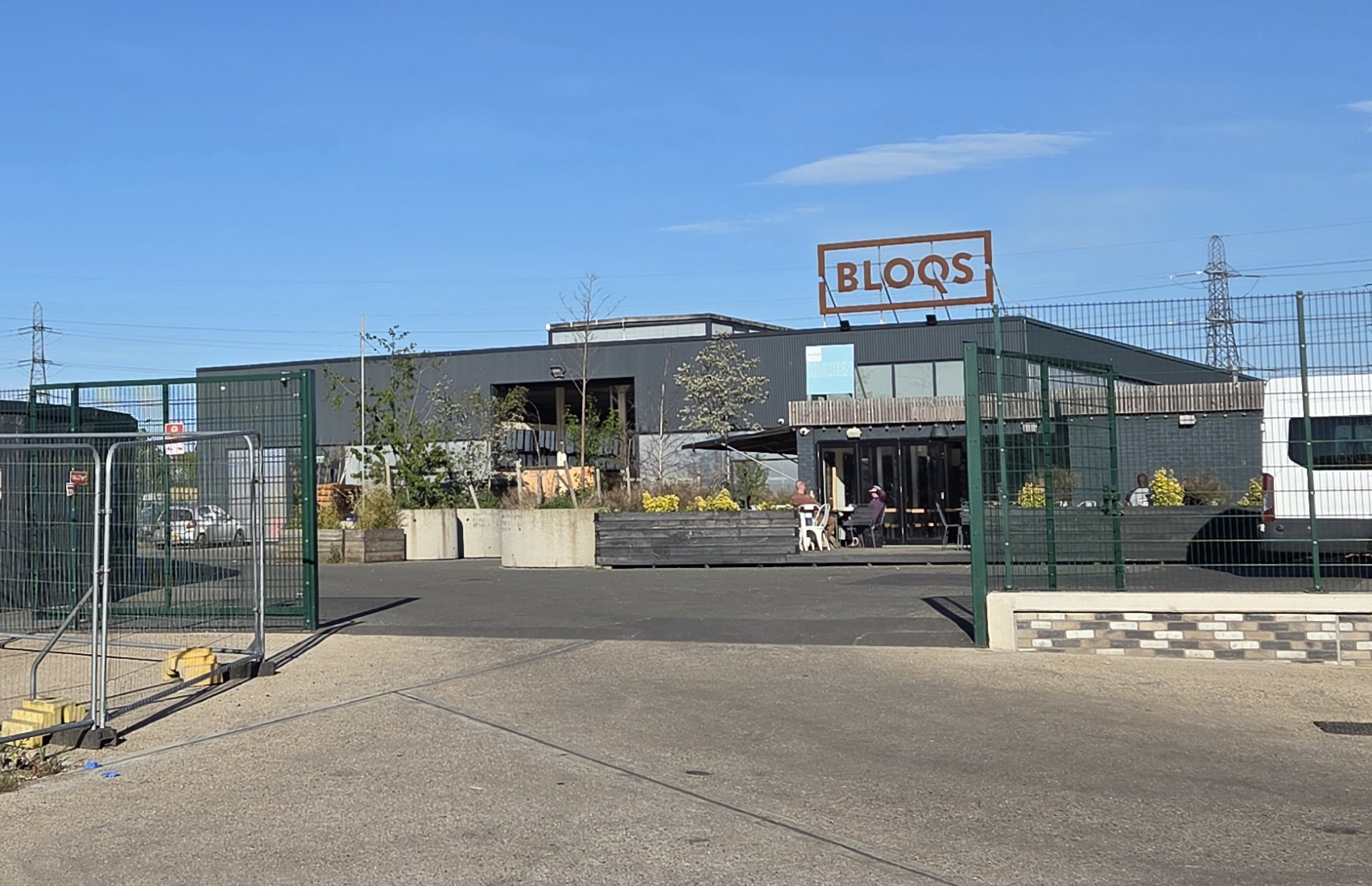
The BLOQS workshop

Building BloQs is an open workshop in Enfield, London. A social enterprise, their emphasis is on creating and maintaining space and resources for people to make a living off their craft. The model is in response to rising rental prices and gentrification in London. In 2017, it had 300 professional members, a 10,000 square foot space, and was called a "proof of concept" for a new 55,000 square foot space. That new space will be part of a 200-acre, £6B urban development project called Meridian Water. The £2.7m project will make Building BloQs the biggest Open Workshop in Europe.

As of September 2017, BloQs maintained studios and tools for Metal and Woodworking, cnc milling, laser cutting, and Textiles. Their space also includes an Artist studio and a cafe, and is mostly flexible space.
