= Northumberland Park railway station (London) =

National Rail station in London, England

Northumberland Park
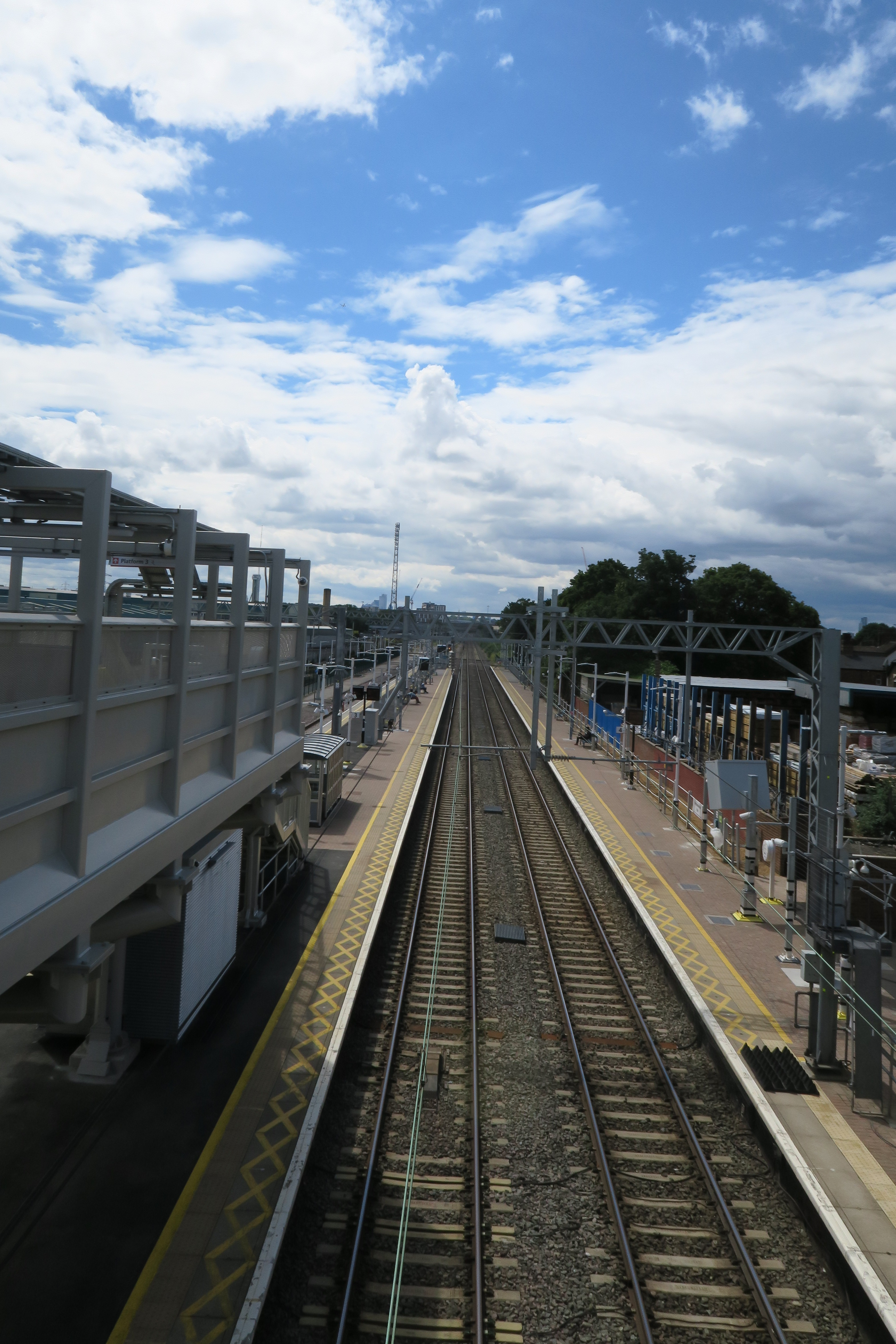
- Northumberland Park in June 2019, looking south
- Interactive map of Northumberland Park

General information
- Location: Northumberland Park
- Local authority: London Borough of Haringey
- Managed by: Greater Anglia
- Station code: NUM
- DfT category: E
- Number of platforms: 3
- Accessible: Yes
- Fare zone: 3

National Rail annual entry and exit
- 2020–21: ▼0.223 million
- 2021–22: ▲0.595 million
- 2022–23: ▲0.787 million
- 2023–24: ▲0.944 million
- 2024–25: ▲1.052 million

Key dates
- 1 April 1842: Opened as Marsh Lane
- 1 June 1852: Renamed Park
- 1 July 1923: Renamed Northumberland Park

Other information
- External links: Departures; Facilities
- Coordinates: 51.6017°N 0.0541°W

Northumberland Park railway station is on the Lea Valley line that forms part of the West Anglia Main Line, serving the ward of Northumberland Park in Tottenham, north London. It is 6 miles 73 chains (11.1 km) down the line from London Liverpool Street and is situated between Tottenham Hale and Meridian Water. Its three-letter station code is NUM and it is in London fare zone 3. It is one of the stations that can be used to access Tottenham Hotspur Stadium.

The station and all trains serving it are operated by Greater Anglia. The station was upgraded in 2017 to add an extra track and a new island platform. It had one of north London's few level crossings to its immediate north, but this was removed in the rebuilding of the station as a result of the STAR (Stratford to Angel Road) project. Northumberland Park Depot for the London Underground's Victoria line is sited adjacent to the station and it is close to Tottenham Hotspur Football Club.

== History ==
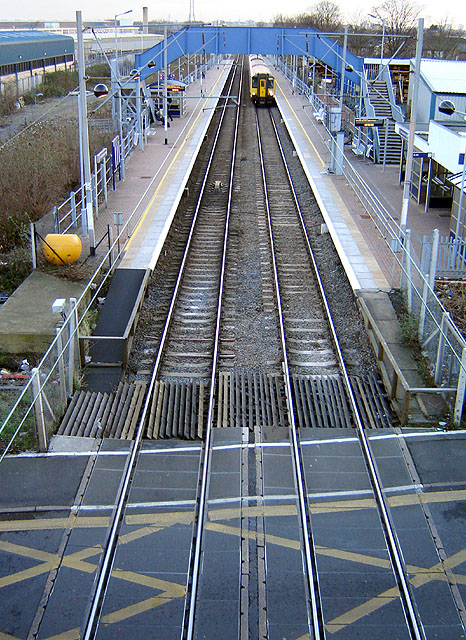
Northumberland Park railway station in February 2006. The station had only two platforms and a level crossing still existed.

Northumberland Park was opened on 1 April 1842 as a Halt on the Northern and Eastern Railway. The station was originally named Marsh Lane after the country lane to Tottenham Marshes on which it is situated.

The Northern and Eastern Railway was leased by the Eastern Counties Railway in 1844 who took over operation of the line. The line was initially laid to a gauge of 5 ft (1,524 mm) but already this had been identified as non-standard and between 5 September and 7 October 1844 the whole network was re-laid to 4 ft 8 1/2 in (1,435 mm) standard gauge.

On 1 June 1852 the station was renamed Park station.

The Eastern Counties Railway was taken over by the Great Eastern Railway in 1862.

In 1882 the line through the station became part of a major rail freight artery with the opening of the Great Northern and Great Eastern Joint Railway. This provided a link for the Great Eastern Railway from the coal fields in the north to London. This led to a second pair of running lines known as the Slow Lines (the ones that exist today - 2013 - are the old Fast Lines) being added in 1913.

In 1919 as well as the two sets of main lines there were some private sidings serving local industries including Tottenham Gas works. Adjacent to the station was a marshalling yard for goods traffic. The yard was under the control of the station master and had three reception sidings and fourteen sorting sidings. Its purpose was the servicing of the various lineside industries on the southern part of the Lea Valley Lines as well as goods depots on the Enfield Town branch line and Chingford branch line. Additionally it used to handle the perishable goods traffic as the policy was to keep this apart from more general traffic.

In 1923 operation passed to the London and North Eastern Railway and the station was renamed to its current title, Northumberland Park on 1 July 1923, this is also the name of the surrounding district, in Tottenham, north London.

On 7 January 1931 there was an accident at Northumberland Park when a coal train hit a shunting locomotive which was then propelled into a brake van of another freight train. This resulted in the brake van catching fire and the train guard was burnt to death.

The signal box (built 1914) was located near the level crossing and was raised up on stilts.

In 1940 during World War II an unexploded anti-aircraft shell fell on the adjacent marshalling yard.

Following nationalisation in 1948 the station became part of the Eastern Region of British Railways.

Around 1961 the marshalling yard was closed and the site used for the Northumberland Park Depot of London Underground's Victoria line. This is the only above ground location where Victoria line stock can be seen and the depot is joined to the main Victoria line at a junction north of Seven Sisters tube station.

The Lea Valley line between Copper Mill Junction and Cheshunt was electrified at 25 kV in 1969. The station was also rebuilt at this time with the work being completed in 1970. Before completion of electrification in 1969, passenger services between Cheshunt and London Liverpool Street through Northumberland Park were normally operated by Class 125 diesel multiple units which had been purpose-built for the line in 1958.

When British Rail sectorisation was introduced in the 1980s, the station was served by Network SouthEast until the privatisation of British Rail.

The signal box (by this date only controlling the level crossing gates) was closed.

== Recent history ==
Following privatisation in 1994 management of the station was initially allocated to a business unit which succeeded the old British Rail structure before being taken over by West Anglia Great Northern (WAGN) in January 1997. Initially owned by Prism Rail, National Express took over operation in July 2000. In 1994 responsibility for the operational infrastructure passed to Railtrack.

In August 2002 signalling control was transferred to the Liverpool Street Integrated Electronic Control Centre (IECC).

The WAGN franchise was replaced in 2003 by the 'One' franchise although this was later renamed National Express East Anglia.

The following year following financial difficulties Railtrack was superseded by Network Rail.

In February 2012 operation of the station changed once again with Abellio Greater Anglia taking over the Greater Anglia franchise.

In March 2017, following consultation with local authorities and the public, the ticket office at Northumberland Park was permanently closed. The station is now unstaffed with assistance reached via station help points. The New Northumberland Park station will also be constructed without a ticket office.

=== Proposals and upgrade ===
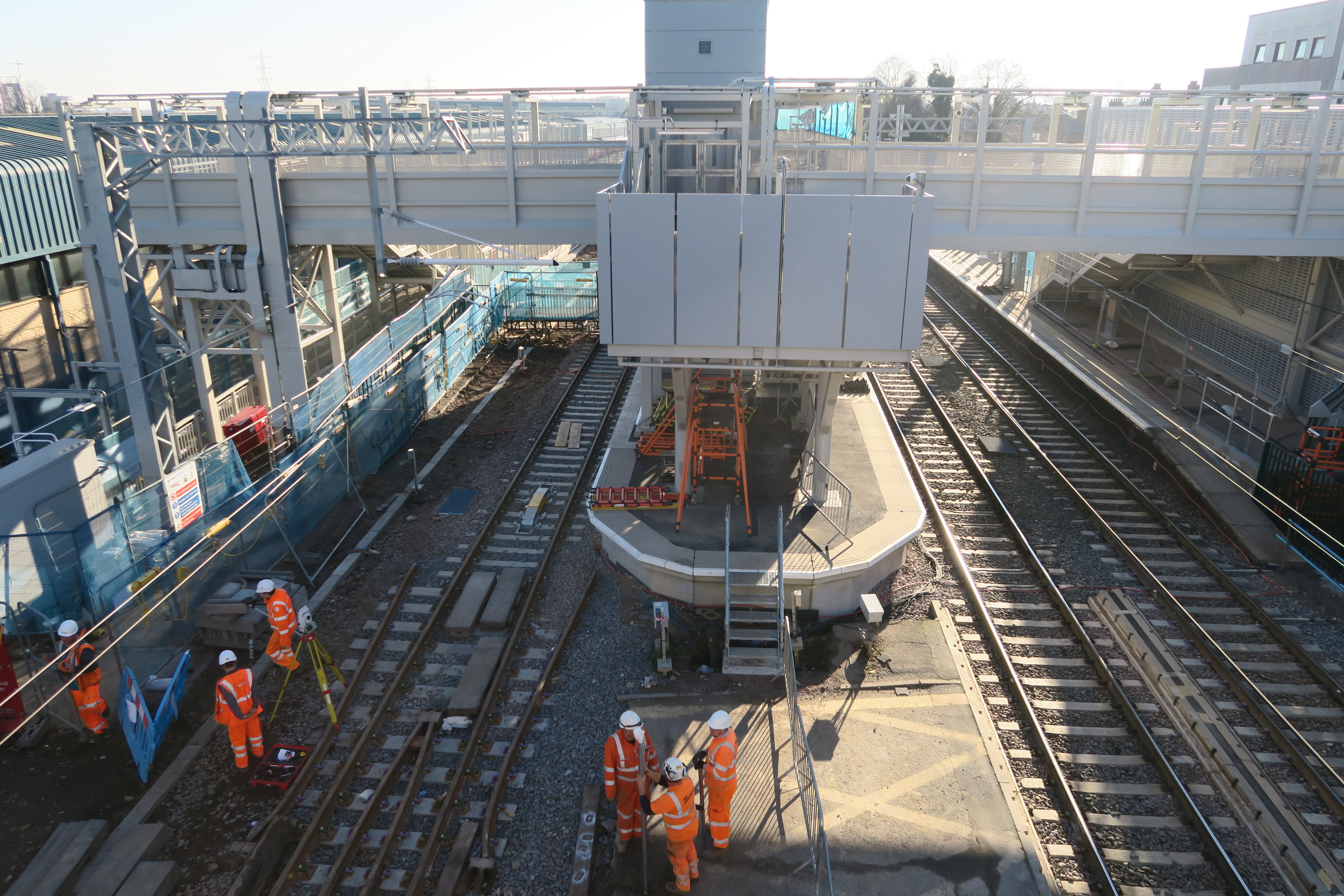
An island platform and a footbridge were constructed and a third track added at Northumberland Park railway station in February 2019. The level crossing was removed.

In 2007 Haringey Council supported proposals for platforms for the Victoria line to be built at Northumberland Park. These would be to the east of the main line platforms between the main line and the Northumberland Park Depot. This was supported by the former mayor of London, Ken Livingstone. It is claimed that this would aid regeneration of the area, and that better transport links would have to be part of plans to increase capacity at White Hart Lane.

In February 2013, the Crossrail task force of business group London First, chaired by former secretary of state for transport Andrew Adonis, published its recommendations on Crossrail 2, favouring a route almost identical to the regional option proposed by TfL in 2011. The report was endorsed by Network Rail. If this happens it is likely that few if any main line trains will continue to call at Northumberland Park.

This proposal will see four tracks restored through Northumberland Park to Tottenham Hale and direct links via central London to the south west suburbs.

In 2017, as part of a £170 million Lee Valley Rail Programme to build a 5.5 km new track between Stratford and a new Meridian Water railway station, the construction of a new island platform with lifts and a new footbridge at Northumberland Park started. The new platform accommodates the new third track allowing an additional two trains per hour to be operated. The level crossing for cars was closed and removed. The work was completed in 2019.

== Connections ==
London Buses routes serve the station.

== Services ==
All services at Northumberland Park are operated by Greater Anglia. The typical off-peak service in trains per hour (tph) is:

- 3 tph to Stratford
- 1 tph to Bishop's Stortford
- 2 tph to Meridian Water

During the peak hours, the hourly services to Bishops Stortford run to Hertford East instead.

On Sundays, the hourly services between Stratford and Bishops Stortford do not run.

When there are events at the nearby Tottenham Hotspur Stadium, some Greater Anglia services to Cambridge, Hertford East (and sometimes Stansted Airport) make additional stops at this station.

Preceding station	National Rail	Following station
Tottenham Hale	Greater Anglia Lea Valley Lines	Meridian Water or Enfield Lock
	Disused railways	
Tottenham Hale	Greater Anglia Lea Valley Lines	Angel Road
