= Edmonton and Winchmore Hill =

UK Parliament constituency (since 2024)

- Borough constituency for the House of Commons
- Interactive map of boundaries from 2024
- Boundary of Edmonton and Winchmore Hill in Greater London
- County: Greater London
- Electorate: 75,204 (March 2020)

Current constituency
- Created: 2024
- Member of Parliament: Kate Osamor (Labour Co-op)
- Seats: One
- Created from: Edmonton & Enfield Southgate

Edmonton and Winchmore Hill is a constituency of the House of Commons in the UK Parliament. Created by the 2023 review of Westminster constituencies, it was first contested at the 2024 general election. It is represented by Kate Osamor of the Labour Party, who had been MP for the predecessor seat of Edmonton since 2015.

== Constituency profile ==
The Edmonton and Winchmore Hill constituency is located in the Borough of Enfield in the north of London. It is named after the town of Edmonton and the suburban neighbourhood of Winchmore Hill. Like much of outer London, the area grew rapidly in the late 19th century with the arrival of rail transport. Edmonton is generally urban in character with mostly terraced housing and high levels of deprivation; most of the town falls within the top 10% most-deprived areas in England. The suburban areas in the west of the constituency around Winchmore Hill are affluent with mostly detached or semi-detached properties. House prices are above national averages but below London averages.

In general, residents of Edmonton and Winchmore Hill have low levels of education and are less likely to work in professional occupations compared to the rest of the country. Household incomes are lower than the London average. The constituency is ethnically diverse; White people made up 46% of the population at the 2021 census with 25% being of White British background. Black people were 23% and Asians were 12%. The Borough of Enfield has the highest proportion of Turkish and Albanian speakers in the country. At the local council, Edmonton is represented by Labour Party and Green Party councillors whilst the Winchmore Hill area mostly elected Conservatives. An estimated 55% of voters in the constituency supported remaining in the European Union in the 2016 referendum, higher than the nationwide figure but lower than London as a whole.

== Boundaries ==
The constituency is composed of the following wards of the London Borough of Enfield:

- Bush Hill Park, Edmonton Green, Grange Park, Haselbury, Highfield, Jubilee, Lower Edmonton, Upper Edmonton, and Winchmore Hill.

It comprises the following areas:

- The majority of the abolished constituency of Edmonton, comprising the Borough of Enfield areas of Bush Hill Park, Edmonton and Haselbury.
- The Borough of Enfield areas of Grange Park, Highfield and Winchmore Hill from the abolished Enfield Southgate constituency.

== Elections ==
=== Elections in the 2020s ===
General election 2024: Edmonton and Winchmore Hill
Party	Candidate	Votes	%	±%
Labour Co-op	Kate Osamor	20,520	50.0	−8.2
Conservative	Zoe Huggins	7,888	19.2	−11.9
Green	Luke Balnave	3,681	9.0	+6.9
Reform	Neville Watson	3,501	8.5	+6.7
Liberal Democrats	Tim Martin	2,721	6.6	−0.1
Independent	Khalid Sadur	1,700	4.1	N/A
Workers Party	Denise Headley	668	1.6	N/A
CPA	Yemi Awolola	366	0.9	N/A
Majority		12,632	30.8	+3.7
Turnout		41,045	54.2	–10.0
Registered electors		75,792		
Labour win (new seat)				

=== Elections in the 2010s ===
2019 notional result
Party	Vote	%
Labour	28,075	58.2
Conservative	15,008	31.1
Liberal Democrats	3,249	6.7
Green	994	2.1
Brexit Party	846	1.8
Others	75	0.2
Turnout	48,247	64.2
Electorate	75,204	
