= The Fake Sound of Progress (song) =

2002 single by Lostprophets

Single by Lostprophets

from the album The Fake Sound of Progress
- Released: 11 March 2002
- Recorded: 2000
- Studio: DEP International Studios
- Genre: Nu metal
- Length: 5:32
- Label: Visible Noise
- Songwriters: Mike Chiplin; Lee Gaze; Mike Lewis; Jamie Oliver; Stu Richardson; Ian Watkins

Lostprophets singles chronology
"Shinobi vs. Dragon Ninja" (2001)	"The Fake Sound of Progress" (2002)	"Burn Burn" (2003)

"The Fake Sound of Progress" is the second single from Welsh rock band Lostprophets' debut studio album The Fake Sound of Progress (2000).

== Music video ==
The music video was filmed in Las Vegas, Nevada. The video opens with the band being brought in to play a private concert after the persistence of their manager until the camera pans around the restaurant, showing each of the band members in disgust with the people in their audience. As the song progresses, Watkins ignores the tables in front of the stage and he opens the front doors, allowing a large number of their fans to rush into the restaurant.

== Track listing ==
CD1
No.	Title	Length
1.	"The Fake Sound of Progress" (radio edit)	4:21
2.	"Happy New Year, Have a Good 1985" (demo)	3:17
3.	"A View to a Kill" (Duran Duran cover)	3:42

CD2
No.	Title	Length
1.	"The Fake Sound of Progress" (radio edit)	4:21
2.	"Shoulder to the Wheel" (Saves the Day cover)	3:22
3.	"Need You Tonight" (INXS cover)	3:46

Promo CD
No.	Title	Length
1.	"The Fake Sound of Progress" (Machine remix – radio edit 1)	4:21
2.	"The Fake Sound of Progress" (Machine remix – radio edit 2)	4:00

Vinyl
No.	Title	Length
1.	"The Fake Sound of Progress" (radio edit)	4:21
2.	"Happy New Year, Have a Good 1985" (demo)	3:17

== Personnel ==
- Ian Watkins – lead vocals
- Lee Gaze – lead guitar
- Mike Lewis – rhythm guitar
- Stu Richardson – bass guitar
- Mike Chiplin – drums, percussion
- Jamie Oliver – synth, turntables, samples, screamed vocals

== Chart positions ==
Year	Chart	Peak
2002	UK Singles Chart	21
2002	UK Indie (OCC)	2
2002	UK Rock & Metal (OCC)	3
