= Shinobi vs. Dragon Ninja =

Single by Lostprophets

from the album The Fake Sound of Progress
- Released: 26 November 2001
- Recorded: 2000
- Studio: DEP International Studios
- Genre: Nu metal
- Length: 2:47
- Label: Visible Noise; Columbia
- Songwriters: Mike Chiplin; Lee Gaze; Mike Lewis; Jamie Oliver; Stu Richardson; Ian Watkins
- Producer: Dan Sprigg

Lostprophets singles chronology
"Shinobi vs. Dragon Ninja" (2001)	"The Fake Sound of Progress" (2002)

"Shinobi vs. Dragon Ninja" is a song by the Welsh rock band Lostprophets. The song was released in 2001 as the lead single from the band's debut studio album, The Fake Sound of Progress. It was the only charting single on the Billboard charts from the album, and was still on the band's tour setlist until they broke up in 2013.

== Writing and production ==
The band wrote the song in under an hour. According to frontman Ian Watkins, it is a song about nostalgia for when the band were growing up together in their home town of Pontypridd, South Wales, and was originally inspired by the Shinobi arcade game they used to play at the Park View Café in Pontypridd. The song's name is derived from the video games Shinobi and Bad Dudes vs. DragonNinja.

== Release and reception ==
"Shinobi vs. Dragon Ninja" was released in the summer of 2001 and became the most successful song from The Fake Sound of Progress on the American rock charts. It appeared on Billboard magazine's Modern Rock Tracks chart at 33. In the United Kingdom the single peaked at 41 on the UK Singles Chart in 2001 and stayed on the charts for two weeks. After the release of the follow-up single "The Fake Sound of Progress" in 2002 "Shinobi vs. Dragon Ninja" re-charted and peaked at 161.

== Music video ==
The video for this single is one of few Lostprophets videos actually filmed in the UK. It features the band performing to a crowd of people on the roof of a disused multi-storey car park in Edmonton, North London. The video received significant airplay on MTV2. The music video was directed by Mike Piscitelli, who would direct the music video for "The Fake Sound of Progress", the follow-up single to "Shinobi vs. Dragon Ninja". The shooting for the music video started on 5 October on a Friday at an undisclosed location. Any fan that wanted to participate in the music video could simply email their name, age, gender and contact number to the band. Once the email was received, the band chose who they wanted to include in the music video. An alternate version of the music video exists in a completely different setting, showing the band performing live. This version was also shot in black and white.

== Track listing ==
CD1
No.	Title	Length
1.	"Shinobi vs. Dragon Ninja"	2:47
2.	"Directions"	4:59
3.	"The Lesson Part 1"	3:12

CD2
No.	Title	Length
1.	"Shinobi vs. Dragon Ninja"	2:47
2.	"Still Laughing" (live)	4:19
3.	"Miles Away from Nowhere"	4:33

Vinyl
No.	Title	Length
1.	"Shinobi vs. Dragon Ninja"	2:47
2.	"Miles Away from Nowhere"	4:33

== Personnel ==
- Ian Watkins – lead vocals
- Lee Gaze – lead guitar
- Mike Lewis – rhythm guitar
- Stu Richardson – bass guitar
- Mike Chiplin – drums, percussion
- Jamie Oliver – synth, turntables, samples

== Chart positions ==
Year	Chart	Position
2001	US Alternative Airplay (Billboard)	33
2001	UK Singles Chart	41
2001	UK Indie (OCC)	5
2001	UK Rock & Metal (OCC)	1
2002	UK Singles Chart	161
