= Ponders End railway station =

National Rail station in London, England

Ponders End
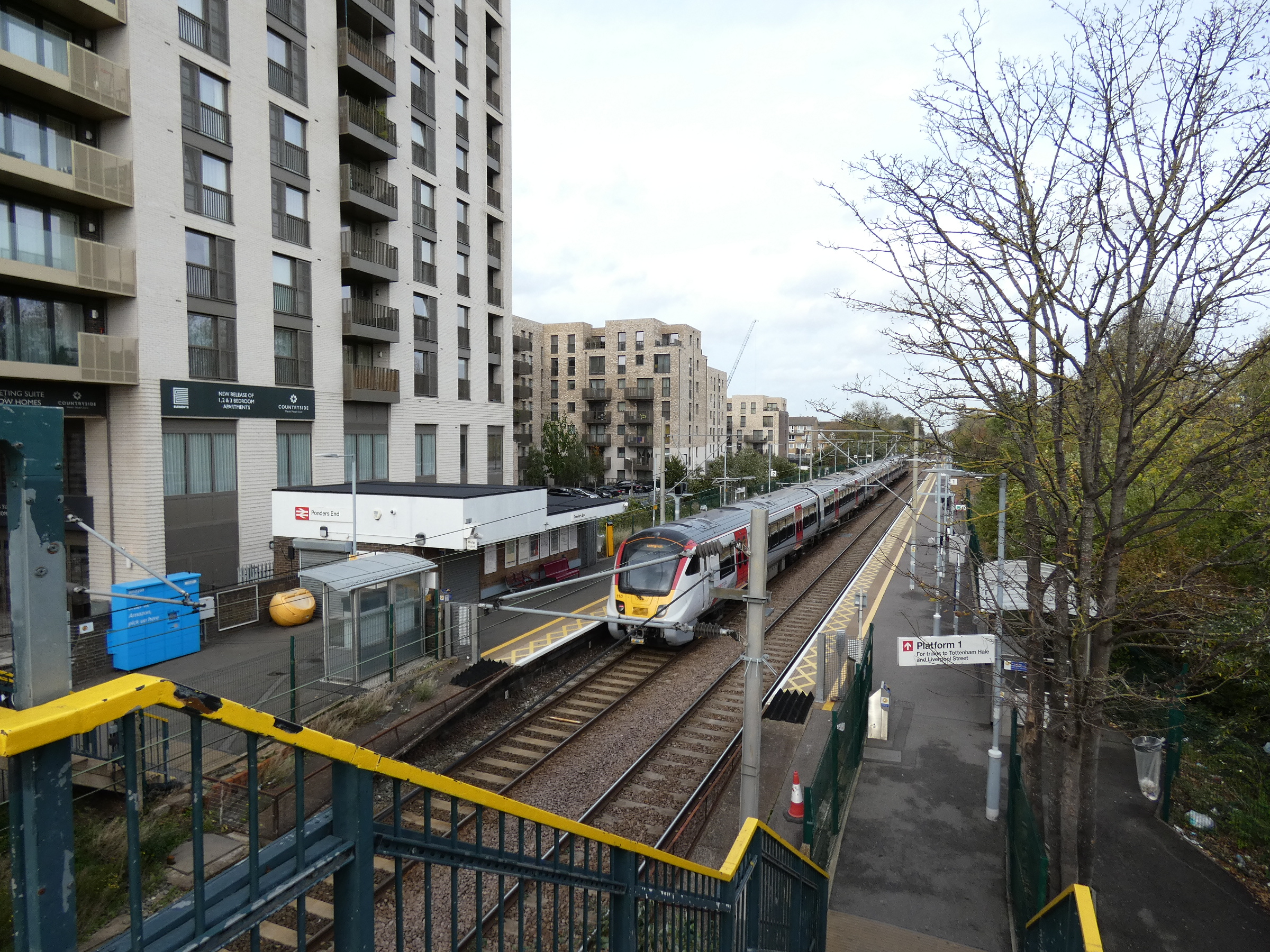
- Ponders End Station in November 2022
- Interactive map of Ponders End

General information
- Location: Ponders End
- Local authority: London Borough of Enfield
- Managed by: Greater Anglia
- Station code: PON
- DfT category: C2
- Number of platforms: 2
- Accessible: Yes
- Fare zone: 5

National Rail annual entry and exit
- 2020–21: ▼0.299 million
- 2021–22: ▲0.561 million
- 2022–23: ▲0.699 million
- 2023–24: ▲0.787 million
- 2024–25: ▲0.884 million

Key dates
- 15 September 1840: Opened

Other information
- External links: Departures; Facilities
- Coordinates: 51.6421°N 0.03518°W

Ponders End railway station is on the West Anglia Main Line, serving the district of Ponders End in the London Borough of Enfield, north London. It is 9 miles 71 chains (15.9 km) down the line from London Liverpool Street and is located between Meridian Water and Brimsdown. Its three-letter station code is PON and it is in London fare zone 5.

The station and all trains serving it are operated by Greater Anglia.

It is near to Lee Valley Leisure Complex.

== History ==
The railway line from Stratford to Broxbourne, and Ponders End station, was opened by the Northern and Eastern Railway on 15 September 1840.

The lines through Ponders End were electrified on 5 May 1969. Prior to the completion of electrification in 1969, passenger services between Cheshunt and London Liverpool Street through Ponders End station were normally operated by Class 125 diesel multiple units (which had been purpose-built for the line in 1958).

== Services ==
All services at Ponders End are operated by Greater Anglia using Class 720 EMUs.

The typical off-peak service is two trains per hour in each direction between Hertford East and London Liverpool Street via Tottenham Hale.

There is one train per weekday to Ely and Stratford respectively, in the early morning peaks.

On Sundays, southbound services at the station run to and from Stratford instead of London Liverpool Street.

Despite being one stop up the line from Meridian Water, there is no direct connection between the two stations, except one service per day.

Preceding station	National Rail	Following station
Tottenham Hale	Greater Anglia Lea Valley Lines	Brimsdown
	Disused railways	
Angel Road	Greater Anglia Lea Valley Lines	Brimsdown

== Connections ==
London Buses route 191, 313 and 491 serve the station.

== Future ==
The station is in the plan for Crossrail 2 Broxbourne branch, but this is very unlikely to happen soon, but may happen in the distant future.
