= Meridian Water =

Long-term regeneration development in North London

Coordinates: 51.6104°N 0.0514°W

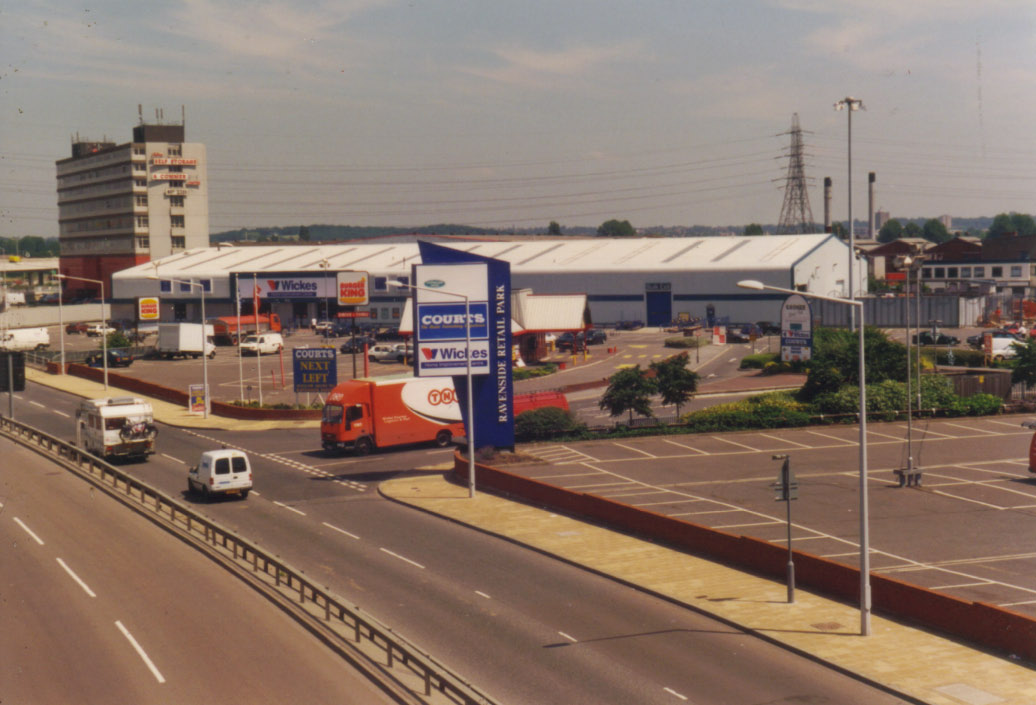
Ravenside Retail Park in 1998

Meridian Water is a £6 billion, 20-year regeneration programme in Upper Edmonton, in the south-east of the London Borough of Enfield, North London. Led by the council, the project will build 10,000 homes next to the Lee Valley Regional Park.

The development has its own railway station which opened in June 2019, replacing Angel Road, connecting to Stratford and London Liverpool Street to the south, and Stansted and Cambridge to the north.

== Current site ==
The 210-acre (85 ha) site is located in the south of the London Borough of Enfield between Edmonton, Tottenham and Walthamstow. It is currently home to the Ravenside Retail park, and a number of large blue warehouse structures, formerly owned by British Oxygen Company, or BOC Group, for the manufacture of liquified gas storage vessels. These buildings are currently being used for storage, industrial and distribution purposes.

The council has acquired 87 acres (35 ha) of land at Meridian Water since April 2014. It currently owns 64% of all developable land within the red line boundary of the site and has to date committed £157 million to land acquisition.

== Current development ==
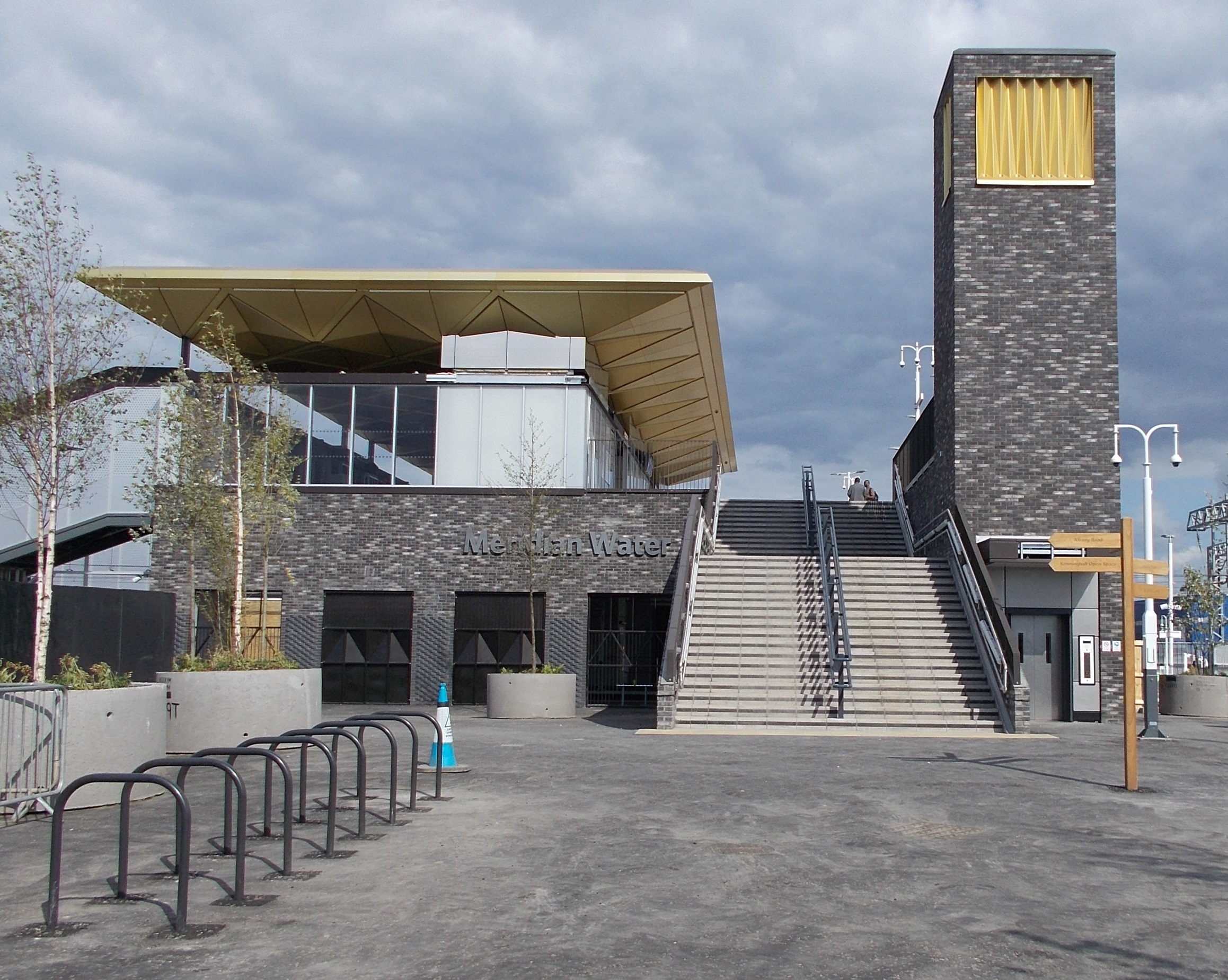
Meridian Water railway station

The first phase of development called "Meridian One" will create the first 725 homes and retail space built at Willoughby Lane, near the new Meridian Water station, which opened in June 2019. This station is estimated to serve up to four million passengers each year at its peak.

A development agreement is in place for the second phase called "Meridian Two" at Leeside Road, which will create 250 affordable homes. The developer intends these homes for 'makers and creators' that will use new workspace on the lower floors. The developer also says that this phase will create a new employment hub with 3,000 square metres (32,000 sq ft) of commercial space at a 2–3-acre (0.8–1.2 ha) site along the North Circular.
