= Meridian Water railway station =

Railway station in the London Borough of Enfield

Meridian Water
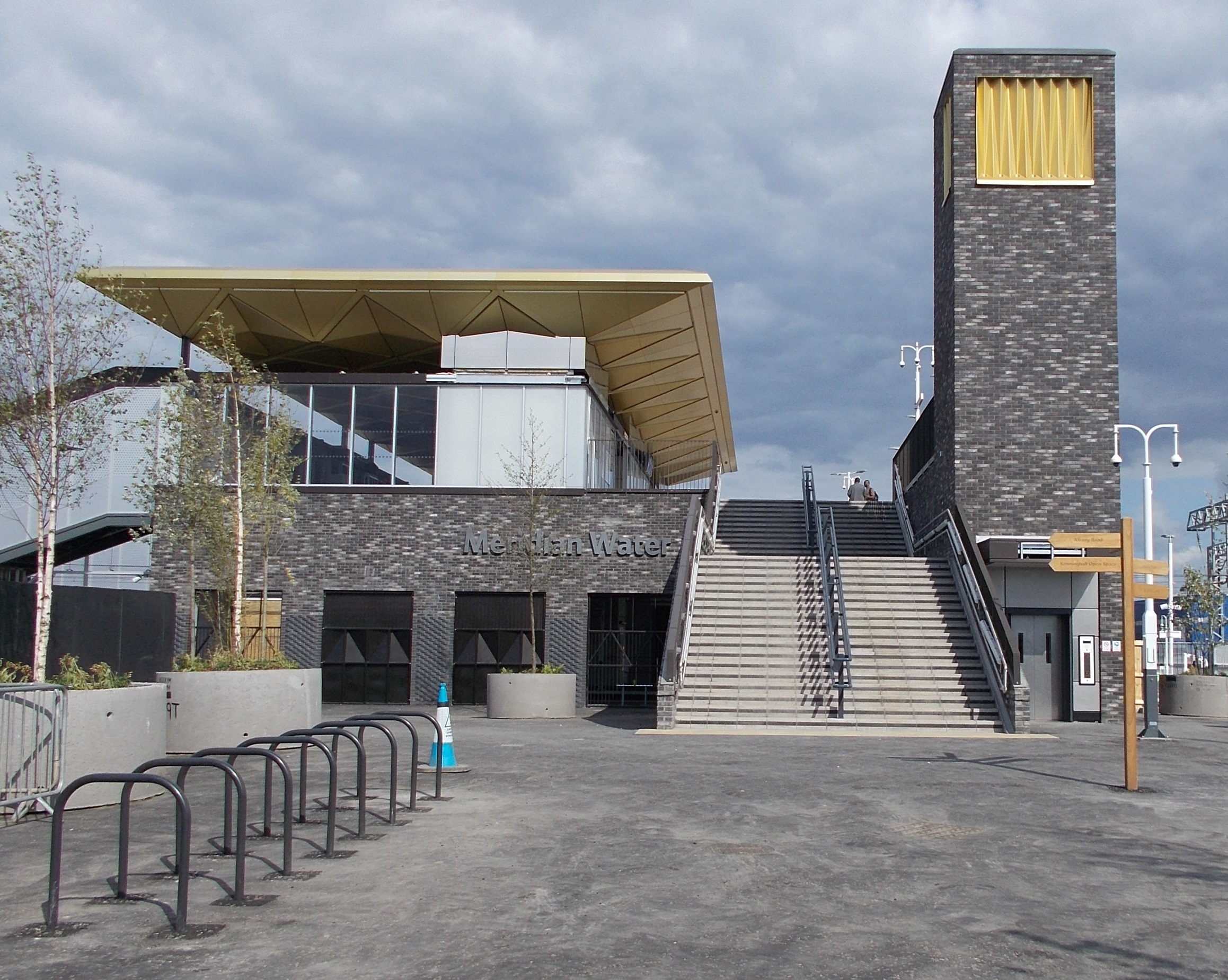
- Interactive map of Meridian Water

General information
- Location: Meridian Water
- Local authority: London Borough of Enfield
- Managed by: Greater Anglia
- Station code: MRW
- Number of platforms: 3
- Fare zone: 4

National Rail annual entry and exit
- 2020–21: ▼79,682
- 2021–22: ▲0.233 million
- 2022–23: ▼0.213 million
- 2023–24: ▲0.472 million
- 2024–25: ▲0.494 million

Key dates
- 3 June 2019: Opened

Other information
- External links: Departures; Facilities
- Coordinates: 51.6100°N 0.0501°W

Meridian Water railway station is on the Lea Valley Lines in Edmonton in the London Borough of Enfield, north London. It opened on 3 June 2019. The station is approximately 580 metres (630 yd) south of the closed Angel Road railway station, which Meridian Water has replaced.

== Layout ==

The new station has three platforms but passive provision for four has been made; the built platforms are numbered 2–4. Platform 1 remains unbuilt with no track laid, but space has been allowed for when required in the future. It is expected 4 million people will use the station annually. There are steps and lifts giving access to Meridian Way immediately to the east; there is also access to the west, which is to be the location of new housing in the Meridian Water development.

In August 2019, it was announced that funding had been approved for construction of a fourth platform and a new section of track between Tottenham Hale and Meridian Water to enable up to 8 trains per hour to serve the station at peak times.

== Services ==
All services at Meridian Water are operated by Greater Anglia using Class 720 EMUs.

The typical off-peak service is two trains per hour to and from Stratford, which start and terminate at Meridian Water. Additional services, including trains to and from Hertford East and Bishop's Stortford call at the station during the peak hours.

Despite being one stop down the line from Ponders End there is no direct connection between the two stations, except one service per day. Outside of peak times, northbound passengers must change at Tottenham Hale.

Preceding station	National Rail	Following station
Northumberland Park	Greater Anglia Lea Valley Lines	Terminus

== Connections ==
London Buses routes 192 and 341 directly serve the station. Routes 34, 444 and SL1 run along the North Circular Road, approximately 500 yards from the station.
