= Angel Road railway station =

Former National Rail station in London, England

Angel Road
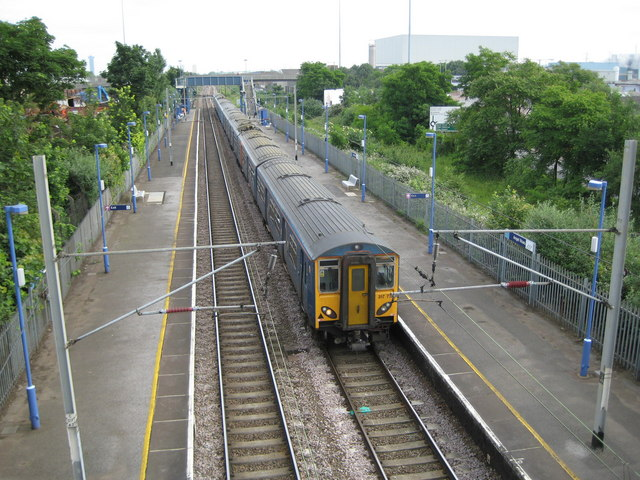
- A class 317 Stansted Express train in the station

General information
- Location: Edmonton, Enfield, London
- Coordinates: 51.6118°N 0.0495°W
- Platforms: 2

History
- Original company: Northern and Eastern Railway
- Pre-grouping: Great Eastern Railway
- Post-grouping: London and North Eastern Railway

Key dates
- 15 September 1840: Opened as Edmonton
- 1 March 1849: Renamed Water Lane
- 1 January 1864: Renamed Angel Road
- 31 May 2019: Closed
- Replaced by: Meridian Water

Passengers
- National Rail annual entry and exit
- 2015–16: ▼27,754
- 2016–17: ▲33,544
- 2017–18: ▼32,938
- 2018–19: ▲35,570
- 2019–20: ▼5,882
Location

Angel Road was a railway station in Edmonton in the London Borough of Enfield, north London, on the Lea Valley line that forms part of the West Anglia Main Line, 7 miles 57 chains (12.4 km) down the line from London Liverpool Street. It was between Northumberland Park and Ponders End in London fare zone 4 and had the three-letter station code AGR. It is located beneath the A406 flyover of Meridian Way, and was accessed via a footpath from Conduit Lane, on an adjacent flyover to the north. The station's immediate surroundings include non-manufacturing industrial businesses and a former gas works.

In 2016–17 it was the least-used station in London, with an estimated 33,500 passenger entries/exits. Angel Road closed permanently to the general public on 31 May 2019 and was replaced by Meridian Water station, which opened on 3 June 2019 and is located 630 yards (580 m) south of Angel Road.

== History ==
The station was opened on 15 September 1840 by the Northern and Eastern Railway as "Edmonton", although it was situated 0.75 miles (1.2 km) from Edmonton village.

The Northern and Eastern Railway was leased by the Eastern Counties Railway in 1844, which took over operation of the line. The line was initially laid to a gauge of 5 ft (1,524 mm) but that had already been identified as non-standard, and between 5 September and 7 October 1844 the whole network was re-laid to 4 ft 8 1/2 in (1,435 mm) standard gauge.

The Eastern Counties Railway renamed the station "Water Lane" on 1 March 1849, after it became a junction, following the opening of a branch to Lower Edmonton to the north-west. The station was taken over by the Great Eastern Railway in 1862 and renamed "Angel Road" on 1 January 1864. It had a small goods yard to the west and the Tottenham gas works was located to the south.

Following the grouping of 1923, Angel Road became part of the London and North Eastern Railway. Regular passenger services ceased on the Lower Edmonton line in 1939, although it was still used as a diversionary route.

With nationalisation in 1948 the station came under the control of the Eastern Region of British Railways. Freight services ceased in 1964 on the Lower Edmonton line and that route was lifted the following year.

The Lea Valley line between Copper Mill Junction and Cheshunt was electrified at 25 kV AC in 1969. Prior to the completion of electrification, passenger services between Cheshunt and London through Angel Road were normally operated by Class 125 diesel multiple units, which had been purpose-built for the line in 1958.

When sectorisation was introduced in 1986, the station was served by Network SouthEast until the privatisation of British Rail in 1994. With privatisation, management of the state-owned track and signals passed to Railtrack, which was succeeded by Network Rail in 2004.

In August 2002, signalling control of the relevant section of track was transferred to the Liverpool Street Integrated Electronic Control Centre (IECC).

== Management companies ==
Following privatisation in 1994, management of the station was allocated to a business unit before being taken over by West Anglia Great Northern (WAGN) in January 1997, at the time owned by Prism Rail. National Express acquired the franchise holder in July 2000. The WAGN franchise was replaced in 2003 by the One franchise, later renamed National Express East Anglia. In February 2012, operation of the station changed once again with Abellio Greater Anglia taking over the franchise.

== Closure ==
The London Borough of Enfield announced in January 2014 that a new station, named "Meridian Water", and some 600 metres (660 yd) to the south, would be constructed as an integral part of the proposed Meridian Water development. The new station is required to cope with the expected increase in passengers associated with the project.

A public consultation was held, in which 78% of consultants opined that the footbridge should be moved to Pilning railway station to replace one removed in 2016.

The new station was expected to open in May 2019. In August 2018, the Department for Transport began a consultation on the proposal to close Angel Road. On 24 January 2019, the DfT announced that Angel Road would officially close on 19 May, with Meridian Water opening on the same day. The closure of the station was ratified by the Office of Rail and Road on 11 April, although the closure date was subsequently rescheduled for 31 May.

== Bibliography ==
- Butt, R. V. J. (October 1995). The Directory of Railway Stations: details every public and private passenger station, halt, platform and stopping place, past and present (1st ed.). Sparkford: Patrick Stephens Ltd. ISBN 978-1-85260-508-7. OCLC 60251199. OL 11956311M.
- Jowett, Alan (2000). Jowett's Nationalised Railway Atlas (1st ed.). Penryn, Cornwall: Atlantic Transport Publishers. ISBN 978-0-906899-99-1. OCLC 228266687.

Preceding station	Historical railways	Following station
Northumberland Park	Greater Anglia; West Anglia Main Line	Ponders End
Northumberland Park	Great Eastern Railway; Lea Valley Lines	Lower Edmonton (Low Level); Line and station closed
