= Edmonton Green Shopping Centre =

Shopping centre in north London, England

Edmonton Green

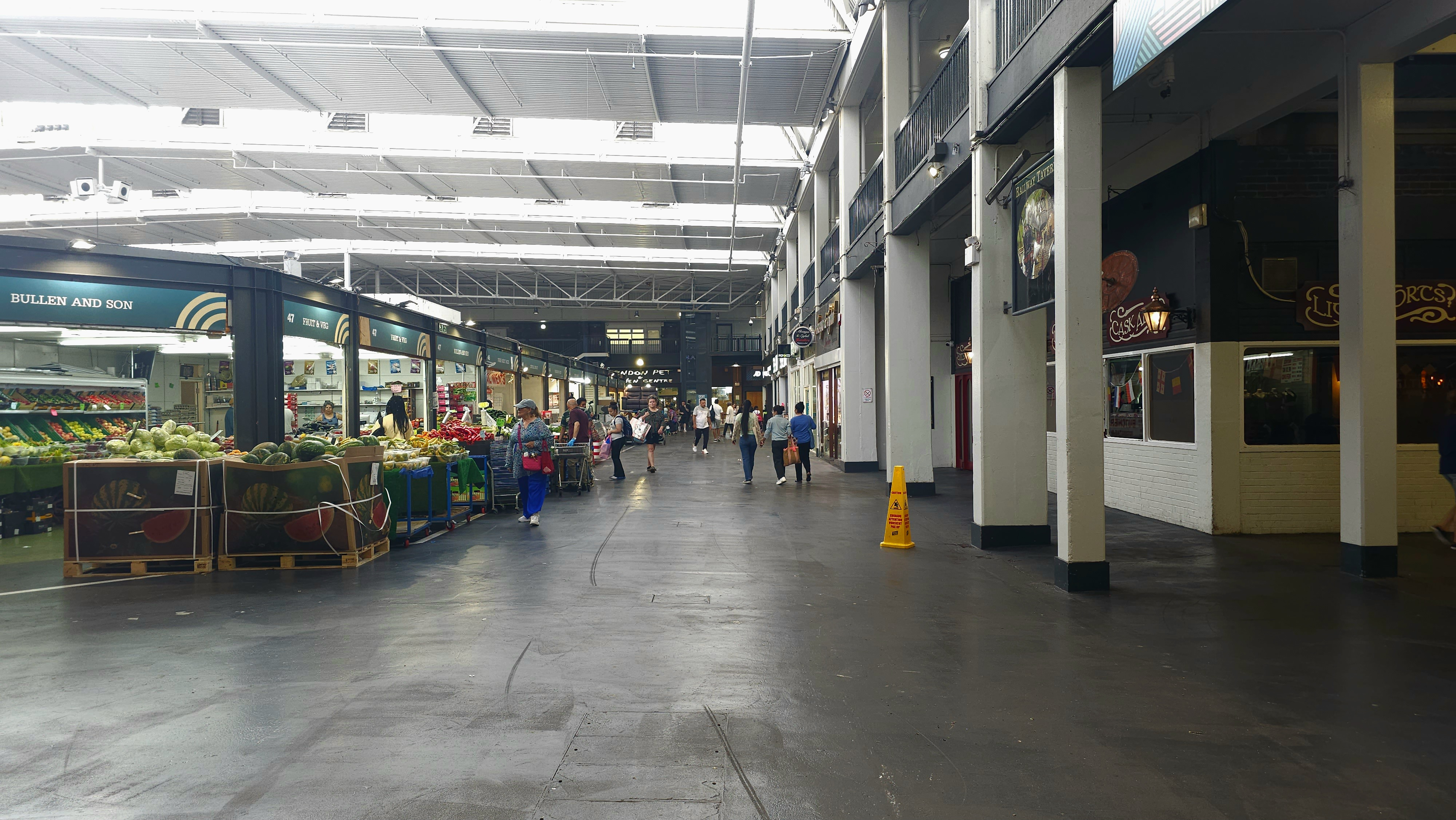
- Edmonton Green Market Square
- Location: Edmonton, London, England
- Coordinates: 51.6247°N 0.0574°W
- Opened: 1967
- Owner: Crosstree
- Num. of stores: 100+
- Floor area: 450,000 sq ft (42,000 m^{2})
- Floors: 3
- Parking: 1000 spaces
- Website: www.edmontongreencentre.co.uk

Edmonton Green shopping centre is a large shopping centre in Edmonton, north London, which also encompasses a market. It is located close to Edmonton Green railway station and a large bus station, on The Broadway. The centre was first opened in 1967.

== History and structure ==
The airy South Mall leading north is sheltered by a translucent roof and lined with a mix of shops. Leading off is the library and offices on three floors which was converted from a former departmental store. In the library, memorial boards to local people, from the old Town Hall can be viewed. The Market Square is a covered area (originally open to the elements) lit by clerestory windows. The market stalls today are permanent fixtures. The big, bustling no-frills market is popular with shoppers with a good range of goods, particularly – greengrocery.

The North Mall is treated differently, in the harder spirit of the late 1960s: a concrete coffered roof alternates with open light-wells, and ends in an open square, with two levels of shops and two stories of flats above; brutalistic, dark brick and shuttered concrete. The backdrop rising from the deck above North Mall is composed of huge slabs of system-built flats which the borough built so keenly at the time.

It was redeveloped in 2008 with a new large ASDA supermarket, which replaced the previous leisure centre that was situated there.

In 2018, Crosstree Real Estate purchased the centre for £72 million.

== Stores ==
As of 2018, Edmonton Green Shopping Centre has over 100 stores, including Sports Direct, Deichmann and Matalan.
