= Upper Edmonton (ward) =

Electoral ward in London, England

- Electoral ward for the Enfield London Borough Council
- Borough: Enfield
- County: Greater London
- Population: 16,724 (2021)
- Major settlements: Upper Edmonton
- Area: 2.299 km²

Current electoral ward
- Created: 2002
- Councillors: 3

Upper Edmonton is an electoral ward in the London Borough of Enfield. The ward was first used in the 2002 elections and elects three councillors to Enfield London Borough Council.

== Geography ==
The ward is named after the suburb of Upper Edmonton.

== Councillors ==
Election	Councillors		
2022	Thomas Fawns (Labour)	Margaret Greer (Labour)	Doris Jiagge (Labour)

== Elections ==
=== 2026 ===
Upper Edmonton (3)
Party	Candidate	Votes	%	±%
Liberal Democrats	Özge Bilecen			
Green	Natasha Brown			
Liberal Democrats	Duygu Cakiroglu			
Reform	Bambo Efstathiou			
Labour	Margaret Greer			
Reform	Stephen Howell			
Reform	John Jackson			
Enfield Community Independents	Meryem Kuscu			
Labour	Tim Leaver			
Labour	Chris McCoy			
Liberal Democrats	Halime Oruc			
Enfield Community Independents	Toby Osmond			
Green	Sophie Peterken			
Conservative	Lindsay Rawlings			
Enfield Community Independents	Khalid Sadur			
Conservative	Andrena Smith			
Conservative	Glynis Vince			
Independent	Sabriye Warsame			
Turnout				

=== 2022 ===
Upper Edmonton (3)
Party	Candidate	Votes	%	±%
Labour	Margaret Greer	2,024	74.2	
Labour	Thomas Fawns	2,011	73.7	
Labour	Doris Jiagge	1,956	71.7	
Conservative	Daniel Pearce	512	18.8	
Conservative	Rachel Shawcross	435	15.9	
Conservative	Hifjur Rahman	431	15.8	
Green	David Flint	292	10.7	
Liberal Democrats	Tudorel Caracuda	202	7.4	
Liberal Democrats	Insaf El-Jaafari	160	5.9	
Liberal Democrats	Sahar Saami	160	5.9	
Turnout			30.6	
Labour hold		Swing		
Labour hold		Swing		
Labour hold		Swing		
