= The Betrayed Tour =

2010 concert tour by Lostprophets

- Tour by Lostprophets
- Location: Europe; Australasia
- Associated album: The Betrayed
- Start date: 18 January 2010
- End date: 29 August 2010
- Legs: 3
- No. of shows: 58; 51 in Europe (2 cancelled); 4 in Asia; 3 in Australia

Lostprophets concert chronology
- Liberation Transmission Tour (2006–2008); The Betrayed Tour (2010)

The Betrayed Tour was a concert tour by alternative rock band Lostprophets, taking place in 2010, in support of their fourth studio album The Betrayed.

The tour began on 18 January 2010, with three special dates in London, Cardiff and Birmingham, as well as a festival appearance at the Outside-In Festival in Newcastle upon Tyne. The official UK tour began on 4 February 2010 and lasted until 28 February 2010, with support act Kids in Glass Houses on all dates, with a changing slot support from Hexes (4–13 February), We Are the Ocean (14–15 February) and Sharks (17 February – 1 March). The Port Talbot 1 March 2010 date was cancelled due to a fire in Afan Lido which caused damage to the venue. The date was rescheduled to 1 May 2010, at the Cardiff International Arena in Cardiff, Wales, with the same support acts.

The band then headlined a short tour of Australia and Japan, with The Blackout supporting on all dates. The Blackout also supported the band on their second European leg which took the bands to such countries as the Netherlands, Germany, Belgium, France and more, with some additional UK & Irish dates, and two Russian dates supported by Those Days. The end of the tour saw the band performing at the Reading and Leeds Festivals, with some additional UK & Scottish dates, with supporting acts Attack! Attack! and Young Guns.

No US dates were played during the tour in support of the album, as the album wasn't even released in the US.

== Set list ==
United Kingdom
- "If It Wasn't for Hate, We'd Be Dead by Now"
- "It's Not the End of the World, But I Can See It from Here"
- "Burn Burn"
- "To Hell We Ride"
- "Darkest Blue"
- "A Better Nothing" / "Dstryr/Dstryr" (Varied between shows)
- "A Thousand Apologies" (Not played on every date)
- "Omen" (The Prodigy cover)
- "Start Something" / "Next Stop, Atro City" (Varied between shows)
- "Can't Catch Tomorrow (Good Shoes Won't Save You This Time)"
- "Last Summer"
- "For He's a Jolly Good Felon"
- "A Town Called Hypocrisy"
- "Last Train Home"
- "Where We Belong"
- "Rooftops (A Liberation Broadcast)"
- "We Are Godzilla, You Are Japan" (Not played on every date)
- "Shinobi vs. Dragon Ninja"

Encore

- "The Light That Burns Twice as Bright..."
Oceania / Asia
- "If It Wasn't for Hate, We'd Be Dead by Now"
- "It's Not the End of the World, But I Can See It from Here"
- "Burn Burn"
- "Darkest Blue" / "A Better Nothing" (Varied between shows)
- "Start Something" / "Omen" (The Prodigy cover) / "Dstyr/Dstyr" (Varied between shows)
- "Can't Catch Tomorrow (Good Shoes Won't Save You This Time)"
- "Last Summer"
- "For He's a Jolly Good Felon"
- "A Town Called Hypocrisy"
- "Last Train Home"
- "Where We Belong"
- "Rooftops (A Liberation Broadcast)"
- "Everyday Combat"

Encore

- "Shinobi vs. Dragon Ninja"
Europe
- "If It Wasn't for Hate, We'd Be Dead by Now"
- "It's Not the End of the World, But I Can See It from Here"
- "Burn Burn"
- "Omen" (The Prodigy cover) / "To Hell We Ride" (Varied between shows)
- "Start Something"
- "Darkest Blue" / "Goodbye Tonight" (Varied between shows)
- "Last Summer"
- "Can't Catch Tomorrow (Good Shoes Won't Save You This Time)"
- "For He's a Jolly Good Felon"
- "Wake Up (Make a Move)" (Not played on every date)
- "A Town Called Hypocrisy"
- "Last Train Home"
- "Where We Belong"
- "Rooftops (A Liberation Broadcast)"
- "Everyday Combat"
- "We Are Godzilla, You Are Japan" (Not played on every date)

Encore

- "Shinobi vs. Dragon Ninja"
- "The Light That Burns Twice as Bright..."

== Tour dates ==
Date	City	Country	Venue
Europe, Leg #1
18 January 2010	London	England	Relentless Garage
30 January 2010	Newcastle upon Tyne	England	Outside-In Festival
4 February 2010	Leicester	England	De Montfort Hall
6 February 2010	Kingston upon Hull	England	Hull City Hall
7 February 2010	Nottingham	England	Rock City
9 February 2010	Margate	England	Margate Winter Gardens
10 February 2010	Portsmouth	England	Portsmouth Guildhall
11 February 2010	London	England	O_{2} Academy Brixton
~~13 February 2010~~	~~Doncaster~~	~~England~~	~~Doncaster Dome~~
13 February 2010	Preston	England	53 Degrees
14 February 2010	Leeds	England	O_{2} Academy Leeds
15 February 2010	Cambridge	England	Cambridge Corn Exchange
17 February 2010	Birmingham	England	O_{2} Academy Birmingham
18 February 2010	Glasgow	Scotland	O_{2} Academy Glasgow
19 February 2010	Edinburgh	Scotland	Edinburgh Corn Exchange
21 February 2010	Yeovil	England	Westlands
22 February 2010	Norwich	England	Norwich U.E.A.
23 February 2010	Newcastle upon Tyne	England	O_{2} Academy Newcastle
25 February 2010	Manchester	England	Manchester Apollo
26 February 2010	Southampton	England	Southampton Guildhall
28 February 2010	Bristol	England	O_{2} Academy Bristol
~~1 March 2010~~	~~Port Talbot~~	~~Wales~~	~~Afan Lido~~
Oceania
27 March 2010	Sydney	Australia	University of NSW Roundhouse
28 March 2010	Melbourne	Australia	Billboard The Venue
30 March 2010	Brisbane	Australia	Tivoli Theatre
Asia
2 April 2010	Nagoya	Japan	PunkSpring Festival
3 April 2010	Osaka	Japan	PunkSpring Festival
4 April 2010	Tokyo	Japan	PunkSpring Festival
6 April 2010	Osaka	Japan	Akasaka BLITZ
Europe, Leg #2
12 April 2010	Antwerp	Belgium	Muziekcentrum TRIX
13 April 2010	Tilburg	Netherlands	013
14 April 2010	Wiesbaden	Germany	Schlachthof
16 April 2010	Amsterdam	Netherlands	Melkweg
18 April 2010	Berlin	Germany	Columbiahalle
19 April 2010	Hamburg	Germany	Markthalle
21 April 2010	Cologne	Germany	Live Music Hall
22 April 2010	Munich	Germany	Theaterfabrik
23 April 2010	Milan	Italy	Magazzini Generali
25 April 2010	Zürich	Switzerland	Alte Börse
26 April 2010	Paris	France	Bataclan
28 April 2010	Bournemouth	England	O_{2} Academy Bournemouth
30 April 2010	Folkestone	England	Leas Cliff Hall
1 May 2010	Cardiff	Wales	Cardiff International Arena
2 May 2010	London	England	The Roundhouse
18 May 2010	Dublin	Ireland	The Academy
19 May 2010	Belfast	Northern Ireland	Mandela Hall
21 May 2010	Wolverhampton	England	Wolverhampton Civic Hall
22 May 2010	Bangor	Wales	Radio 1's Big Weekend
24 May 2010	Moscow	Russia	Gorbushka
25 May 2010	Saint Petersburg	Russia	GlavClub
5 June 2010	Cardiff	Wales	Millennium Stadium
Europe, Leg #3
30 July 2010	Gräfenhainichen	Germany	Jump Community Party
23 August 2010	Glasgow	Scotland	O_{2} ABC Glasgow
24 August 2010	Glasgow	Scotland	O_{2} ABC Glasgow
25 August 2010	London	England	O_{2} Shepherd's Bush Empire
27 August 2010	Reading	England	Reading Festival
28 August 2010	Belfast	Northern Ireland	Belsonic
29 August 2010	Leeds	England	Leeds Festival

== Support acts ==
- Attack! Attack! (21 May 2010; 24–25 August 2010)
- Foxy Shazam (25 August 2010)
- Hexes (4–13 February, 1 May 2010)
- Jody Has A Hitlist (18–19 May 2010)
- Kids in Glass Houses (4–28 February, 1 May 2010)
- Sharks (17–28 February, 1 May 2010)
- Stornoway (2 May 2010)
- The Blackout (27–30 March, 6–30 April, 2 May 2010)

- The Dead Formats (21 May 2010)
- The Maple Room (12 April 2010)
- Those Days (24–25 May 2010)
- Tonight Alive (27–30 March 2010)
- We Are Scientists (2 May 2010)
- We Are the Ocean (14–15 February 2010)
- Young Guns (23 August 2010)

== Personnel ==
- Ian Watkins – lead vocals
- Lee Gaze – lead guitar, backing vocals
- Mike Lewis – rhythm guitar, backing vocals
- Stuart Richardson – bass, backing vocals
- Jamie Oliver – synth, turntables, samples, vocals
- Luke Johnson – drums, backing vocals
