= Weapons (album) =

Studio album by Lostprophets
- Released: 30 March 2012
- Recorded: May–November 2011; NRG Recording Studios, Hollywood
- Genre: Alternative rock
- Length: 51:07
- Labels: Epic; Fearless
- Producers: Ken Andrews (List of additional production)

Lostprophets chronology
The Betrayed (2010)	Weapons (2012)

Singles from Weapons
- 1. "Bring 'Em Down" Released: 6 February 2012; 2. "We Bring an Arsenal" Released: 4 June 2012; 3. "Jesus Walks" Released: 10 September 2012 (cancelled)

Weapons is the fifth and final studio album by the Welsh rock band Lostprophets. It was released through Epic Records on 30 March 2012.

It was the band's lone record to feature drummer Luke Johnson, though former drummer Ilan Rubin appears on the hidden title track and on archival material included on the album's "deluxe edition". Weapons was also the last album to be released by the band before lead vocalist Ian Watkins was convicted and imprisoned for numerous child sex offences, which led to their disbandment in 2013.

Like the earlier Liberation Transmission (2006), the album's artwork features a passage on Latin on the front cover, which reads deus velox nex (God is swift death).

== Writing and recording history ==
The band started writing new material after finishing The Betrayed Tour. The album was produced by Ken Andrews at Hollywood. Several songs were debuted before it official release date. "Bring Em' Down" was played live in the warm up shows for the 2011 V Festival, and was aired as the first single from Weapons on Zane Lowe's Hottest Record on 6 February 2012. "We Bring an Arsenal" made its debut on 25 February 2012. The song "Better Off Dead" received its first radio play by BBC Radio 1's Zane Lowe as his "Hottest Record in the World". As of 6 January 2012 it was made available for download from the band's official website.

== Release and promotion ==
This was Lostprophets' only studio release through Epic (UK) and Fearless (US) after leaving their long-time served record label, Visible Noise. Lostprophets also announced an extensive tour of the UK and Ireland, consisting of 14 shows which commenced on the 15 April 2012 in Dublin and finished on the 4 May 2012 in London. It was released in the UK on 2 April 2012 and it was released in the US on 19 June 2012. Because the fourth studio album The Betrayed was not released in North America, it's the band's fourth released album in some regions. The "deluxe edition" of the albums contains three "Garage sessions" tracks, recorded in 2007 as demos for the ultimately-abandoned album sessions with John Feldmann prior to The Betrayed, with the track "Weapon" from the same sessions included as a hidden track on all versions of the album. Further more bonus tracks are found on the Japanese "deluxe edition". The US "deluxe edition" is different from the UK edition. Lostprophets headlined the Warped Tour UK in November 2012.

=== Singles ===
The first single, "Bring 'Em Down", was released on 23 March 2012. "We Bring an Arsenal" was the second single, released on 4 June 2012. "Jesus Walks" was planned for release on 10 September 2012; but it never eventuated, although a music video was released for the song. Watkins and lead guitarist Lee Gaze shot a further music video in December 2012, while the rest of the band were in the USA, though this was never released due to Watkins' arrest later in the month. The music video shoot was the last time Gaze and Watkins met.

== Reception ==
Professional ratings
Aggregate scores
Source	Rating
Metacritic	56/100
Review scores
Source	Rating
AllMusic	3.5/5 stars
Alternative Press	3/5 stars
BBC Music	favourable
DIY	5/10
The Guardian	4/5 stars
Kerrang!	4/5 stars
MusicOMH	3.5/5 stars
NME	5/10
Q	2/5 stars
Rock Sound	8/10
Sputnikmusic	3.5/5 stars
Uncut	5/10

As of May 2012, the album held a normalised score of 56 out of 100 on Metacritic, indicating "mixed or average reviews", making it the lowest rated album released by the band to date. As a result, critics generally viewed the album as a decline in the band's career.

AllMusic stated that the fifth studio album strikes a nice balance between the metallic fury and desperation of their debut, The Fake Sound of Progress, and the slicker, more commercial sound of The Betrayed. It also has been compared with "chrome-drunk" classic of The Godfathers, with electro-metal of Muse, enthusiasm with Green Day.

Alternative Press states "With the exception of the cheesy posturing of 'We Bring An Arsenal' and the flat strains of 'Somedays,' every track has something going for it, even if it's only an occasional riff or lyrical hook....For now, this stands as another good if inessential addition to their catalog — a phrase that, for better or worse, applies to the majority of their output."

BBC Music and The Guardian similarly reviewed the album positively, with the same "us-against-the-world" feeling of the band's second studio album, Start Something.

== Track listing ==
All lyrics are written by Ian Watkins; all music is composed by Lostprophets

Original CD
No.	Title	Length
1.	"Bring 'Em Down"	4:09
2.	"We Bring an Arsenal"	3:26
3.	"Another Shot"	4:08
4.	"Jesus Walks"	4:35
5.	"A Song for Where I'm From"	3:52
6.	"A Little Reminder That I'll Never Forget"	4:16
7.	"Better Off Dead"	3:37
8.	"Heart on Loan"	4:08
9.	"Somedays"	3:42
10.	"Can't Get Enough" (includes hidden track, "Weapon") (5:00 on deluxe edition and US edition, without hidden track)	15:14
Total length:		51:07

Deluxe edition bonus tracks
No.	Title	Length
11.	"The Dead" (Garage sessions)	3:34
12.	"Save Yourself" (Garage sessions)	3:59
13.	"If You Don't Stand for Something, You'll Fall for Anything" (Garage sessions)	4:39
14.	"Another Shot" (Demo)	2:59
15.	"Bring 'Em Down" (Russell Block Party remix) (includes hidden track, "Weapon") (3:43 on Japanese deluxe edition, without hidden track)	10:15
Total length:		66:18

Japanese deluxe edition bonus tracks
No.	Title	Length
16.	"Young Pretenders"	3:25
17.	"Undefeated" (includes hidden track, "Weapon")	10:15
Total length:		73:26

Japanese deluxe edition bonus DVD
No.	Title	Length
1.	"4:AM Forever" (music video)	4:20
2.	"For He's a Jolly Good Felon" (music video) (edit)	3:16
3.	"For He's a Jolly Good Felon" (music video) (full-length version)	7:49
Total length:		15:25

US bonus track
No.	Title	Length
11.	"Weapon" (although "Weapon" is available on all editions as a hidden track, on the US edition it is featured as a separate, non-hidden track.)	2:47
Total length:		43:39

US deluxe edition bonus tracks
No.	Title	Length
12.	"If You Don't Stand for Something, You'll Fall for Anything" (Garage sessions)	4:39
13.	"Undefeated"	4:55
14.	"Young Pretenders"	3:25
15.	"Bring 'Em Down" (acoustic version)	3:12
16.	"We Bring an Arsenal" (acoustic version)	3:32
Total length:		62:02

== Personnel ==
Credits for Weapons adapted from liner notes.

Lostprophets

- Ian Watkins – lead vocals, art direction
- Lee Gaze – lead guitar
- Mike Lewis – rhythm guitar
- Stu Richardson – bass guitar, co-production, additional engineered
- Jamie Oliver – piano, keyboards, samples, vocals
- Luke Johnson – drums, percussion

Additional musicians

- Ilan Rubin – drums, percussion (Garage session tracks and "Weapon")

Production

- Ken Andrews – production, engineered, mixing, additional guitar, synth, backing vocals
- Justin Hopfer – co-production, additional engineered
- Romesh Dodabgoda – co-production, additional engineered
- Sean Curiel – assistant engineered
- Marco Ruiz – assistant engineered
- Rouble Kapoor – assistant engineered
- Liam Ross – assistant engineered
- Tom Manning – assistant engineered
- Brendan Davies – assistant engineered
- Aaron Rubin – A&R, production, mixing (tracks: 11–15 and "Weapon")
- Tom Baker – mastered
- Russell Lissack – production (track: 15)
- James Ellis – production (track: 15)
- Dick Beetham – mastered (tracks 11–17 and "Weapon")
- Dan Mandell – art direction
- Andrew Whitton – photography

== Charts ==
Chart (2012)	Peak position
Australian Albums (ARIA)	55
Austrian Albums (Ö3 Austria)	76
German Albums (Offizielle Top 100)	86
Irish Albums (IRMA)	52
Japanese Albums (Oricon)	22
Scottish Albums (Official Charts)	8
UK Albums (Official Charts)	9
UK Album Downloads (Official Charts)	10
UK Rock & Metal Albums (Official Charts)	1
US Billboard 200	145

== Release history ==
Release history and formats for Weapons
Region	Date	Label	Format
Europe	30 March 2012	Sony	CD; digital download
Australia	6 April 2012	Sony	CD; digital download
Japan	11 April 2012	Sony	CD; digital download
United Kingdom	2 April 2012	Epic	CD; digital download; LP
United States	19 June 2012	Fearless	CD; digital download; LP
