= Bionic (King Adora song) =

- CD 2 artwork

Single by King Adora

from the album Vibrate You
- B-side: "Don't Trust The Ones You Love", "Freak"
- Released: 14 May 2001
- Recorded: Sawmills Studios
- Genre: Punk rock, hard rock, glam rock
- Length: 2:13
- Label: Superior Quality Recordings
- Songwriter(s): Matt Browne, Martyn Nelson
- Producer(s): John Cornfield

King Adora singles chronology
"Suffocate" (2001)	"Bionic" (2001)	"Born To Lose/Kamikaze" (2003)

"Bionic" is the fifth single by British glam rock band King Adora. Originally released as a part of a double a-side in 2000, the re-recorded single was released on 14 May 2001 on Superior Quality Recordings and reached number 30 on the UK Singles Chart, becoming the band's second and final Top 40 single. The song would be included on the band's debut album Vibrate You and was frequently played at their live shows.

== Background ==
=== Recording and re-release ===
"Bionic" was one of the first songs written by King Adora and appeared on their debut single release, "Bionic/The Law". The band were unhappy with the original version of the song, saying "no disrespect to the first producer (Chris Sheldon), we just felt it needed a little bit more balls behind it really and we tried to deliver it a bit better and make it a better record, it was always one of our favourite songs". As drummer Dan Dabrowski stated, the decision to re-release the song was made because "a lot more people deserve to hear it. I mean, we only released it as a first single". The re-recorded version of the song was produced and mixed by John Cornfield at Sawmills Studios in Cornwall.

== B-sides ==
The single was accompanied by two b-sides, "Don't Trust The Ones You Love" and "Freak". Both songs were recorded at DEP International Studios in Birmingham and were produced by the band and Dan Sprigg, with engineering from Jamie Travers. Both songs were played live during 2001 and at the band's 2010 reunion gigs.

== Video ==
The "Bionic" release was accompanied by King Adora's fourth music video, directed by Ben Hume-Paton. The video features the band (all wearing bionic implants) performing the song in a disused factory setting.

== Reception ==
NME gave the song a poor review, saying "this particular incarnation of 'heavy indie' for people who would never admit to listening to Rawk! could have been recorded at any time in the last twelve years, encased as it is in that peculiarly timeless and sterile MTV sheen".

== Track listing ==
=== CD 1 ===
1. "Bionic"
2. "Don't Trust The Ones You Love"
3. "Bionic" (Absolute Zero remix)

=== Enhanced CD 2 ===
1. "Suffocate"
2. "Freak"
3. "Bionic" (video)

=== 7" ===
1. "Bionic"
2. "Don't Trust The Ones You Love"

== Personnel ==
- Matt Browne – vocals, rhythm guitar
- Martyn Nelson – lead guitar
- Robbie Grimmit – bass
- Dan Dabrowski – drums

== Production ==
- Bionic – Produced and mixed by John Cornfield, engineered by Mark Thomas
- Don't Trust The Ones You Love, Freak – Produced by King Adora and Dan Sprigg, engineered by Jamie Travers
