= Bring 'Em Down =

Single by Lostprophets

from the album Weapons
- Released: 6 February 2012
- Recorded: 2011
- Studio: NRG, Hollywood
- Genre: Alternative metal; electronic rock
- Length: 4:09 (album version); 3:30 (radio edit)
- Label: Epic
- Songwriters: Lee Gaze; Mike Lewis; Jamie Oliver; Stu Richardson; Ian Watkins
- Producer: Ken Andrews

Lostprophets singles chronology
"For He's a Jolly Good Felon" (2010)	"Bring 'Em Down" (2012)	"We Bring an Arsenal" (2012)

"Bring 'Em Down" is the first single from Weapons, the fifth studio album by the Welsh rock band Lostprophets released on 23 March 2012. It was first played live on 11 August 2011 at O2 Academy Oxford, England. It made its first radio airplay on 6 February 2012. The song impacted US radio on 5 June 2012. It was the final Lostprophets song to chart in America, peaking at number 39 on the Mainstream Rock Charts.

== Music video ==
The video for "Bring 'Em Down" was released on 9 March 2012. The behind the scenes footage was released on 23 March.

The video features Ian Watkins in what is believed to be a hostage situation. The people who have him hostage brutally beat him down continually. As this is happening, the rest of the band members are on a search for rescue of Watkins. They also secretly send off a smokebomb-like device. Reaching Watkins eventually, they take on revenge, as the smokebomb goes off. The video ends with the band victorious and successfully rescuing him. This is the first Lostprophets video not to feature them performing.

== Track listing ==
All lyrics are written by Ian Watkins; all music is composed by Lostprophets.

Digital Download Single
No.	Title	Length
1.	"Bring 'Em Down" (album version)	4:09
2.	"Better Off Dead"	3:37

== Chart positions ==
Chart	Peak
UK Singles Chart	160
UK Rock & Metal (OCC)	5
US Billboard Hot Mainstream Rock Tracks	39

== Personnel ==
Lostprophets

- Ian Watkins – lead vocals
- Jamie Oliver – piano, synth, keyboard, samples, vocals
- Lee Gaze – lead guitar
- Mike Lewis – rhythm guitar
- Stu Richardson – bass guitar
- Luke Johnson – drums, percussion

== In popular culture ==
Along with "We Bring an Arsenal", the song was featured on the soundtrack of Forza Horizon.
