= It's Not the End of the World, But I Can See It from Here =

Single by Lostprophets

from the album The Betrayed
- Released: 19 August 2009
- Recorded: November 2008
- Studio: Sunset Sound, Los Angeles
- Genre: Alternative metal
- Length: 4:09; 3:47 (radio edit)
- Label: Visible Noise (UK); Sony UK (US)
- Songwriter: Ilan Rubin
- Producer: Stu Richardson

Lostprophets singles chronology
"4:AM Forever" (2007)	"It's Not the End of the World, But I Can See It from Here" (2009)	"Where We Belong" (2010)

"It's Not the End of the World, But I Can See It from Here" is the twelfth single by the Welsh rock band Lostprophets, and the first from their fourth studio album The Betrayed (2010). It was sent to radio on 19 August 2009 in the UK and released as a physical single on 12 October, the first time they had released anything since April 2007. The release also features the song "AC Ricochet". Drummer Ilan Rubin wrote the song when he was 16, though there were changes and a middle 8 written with the band.

== Reception ==
Professional ratings
Review scores
Source	Rating
BBC Music	4/5 stars
Click Music	3.5/5 stars
Rock Louder	5/5 stars

BBC Music made comparisons with the music of My Chemical Romance and stated that the song consisted of "double-speed punk backbeat, the apocalyptic end-of-all-things lyrics, the massive terrace chant chorus, the strange effect on the vocals and the general air of churning turmoil". It was also described as being dramatic and raised expectations for the corresponding album. In a separate review BBC Wales Music said "it stands up with the likes of "Burn Burn" as one of their more abrasive hit singles".

Click Music called the single "typical Lostprophets – big riffs and an even bigger chorus" and praised the guitar motifs, but mentioned that it lacked "lyrical credibility".

Rock Louder was very favourable stating that it was a "Godzilla-sized" track that is "one of the catchiest songs to be released this year".

Q magazine described it as "an end-of-days anthem tailor-made for the closing credits of Roland Emmerich's next apocalyptic blockbuster".

It was included in Kerrang!'s Playlist for the week starting 30 September 2009 who described it as a "stadium-sized singalong".

Rock Sound magazine described the song as a "typical Prophets anthemic sing-alongs that'll please the aficionados". Whilst in the Rock Sound Readers Poll 2009 it reached number five in the Best Single category.

However, not all reviews were positive. Gigwise thought the song was "one of the weaker tracks on the album" and noted that "despite two guitarists duelling each other admirably never truly feels as big as it should be".

== Radio ==
The first airing of the single was on Zane Lowe's BBC Radio 1 show on 19 August 2009, and on the same day was announced as Zane Lowe's Hottest Record of the day, with the DJ saying "very few of the UK hard rockers have the catalogue of hits and here's another" and also calling it a "stomper". It was then given a place on the A List playlist on BBC Radio 1, as well as being extensively played on Kerrang Radio and Total Rock Radio. Ian Watkins was on BBC Radio 1's Review Show with Nihal on 29 September 2009 to promote the single.

== Live performances ==
The song was debuted at Download Festival in June 2008. In addition to featuring in every show of The Betrayed Tour, nearly always being the second track in the setlist, the track was played when the band headlined the NME/Radio 1 Stage at Leeds Festival in 2010, appearing fifth in the setlist along with Radio 1's Big Weekend of the same year in Bangor, North Wales, where it was played as part of an eight track setlist when the band appeared on the Main Stage.

== Music video ==
A shot of Ian Watkins (right) and Lee Gaze (left) with the rest of the band (background) in a city car park.

In the video the band is playing in a car park in a metropolis. Gradually all of the surrounding buildings crumble and the fragments float into the sky, eventually blocking out the sun. This is the first video to feature Luke Johnson on drums. Speaking behind the scenes of their next video "Where We Belong", Ian Watkins said that the video for the song had been directed by one of the band's closest friends, David Allen. Some scenes from the "Where We Belong" video were also filmed on the same day.

The video was posted to YouTube by Visible Noise on 18 September 2009. It has since been viewed nearly two million times making it one of the band's most popular videos.

It was nominated at the Kerrang! Awards 2010 for Best Video, but lost out to Biffy Clyro's "The Captain". The video also ranked number 20 on Kerrang! TV's Rock 100 list for 2010.

== Personnel ==
- Ian Watkins – lead vocals
- Lee Gaze – lead guitar
- Mike Lewis – rhythm guitar
- Stu Richardson – bass guitar
- Jamie Oliver – piano, synth, keyboard, samples, vocals
- Ilan Rubin – drums, percussion (recording)
- Luke Johnson – drums, percussion (music video)

== Chart positions ==
Chart	Position
UK Singles Chart	16
UK Rock Chart	1
UK Indie Chart	2
