= Farse (band) =

English rock band

- Origin: Birmingham, England
- Genre: Ska-punk
- Years active: 1996–2004; 2009
- Labels: Sucka Punch; Moon Ska Europe
- Past members: Ollie Patrick; Chris Badham; Ade Preston; Dan O'Connell; Tomas Whitehouse; Dean Ashton; Adam Price; Tom Rose

Farse were an English five-piece ska-punk band from Birmingham.

== History ==
They attended St. Thomas Aquinas school in Birmingham, where the band formed in 1996 as a four-piece, with the lineup of Ollie Patrick (vocals/guitar), Chris Badham (bass), Dan O'Connell (drums) and Tom Rose (guitar). After releasing a string of demos and a few line up changes (Tom Whithouse joining on second Guitar, leaving Ollie as Vocalist and Ade Preston replacing Tom Rose in the same year), they released their debut album, Means to an End, (recorded at Rich Bitch studios, Selly Oak, Birmingham) on 8 October 2001. The record created a buzz throughout the underground punk and ska scene in the UK and attracted the attention of the Moon Ska Europe label.

In late 2002 Farse entered UB40's DEP International Studios to record their second album, Boxing Clever. Following the album's release the band's popularity grew, with the video for the song Hopscotch receiving heavy rotation on the now-defunct digital music channel P-Rock. The band then embarked on several headlining tours throughout the UK before unexpectedly announcing their split in early 2004. Their full final tour was with Phinius Gage at the end of 2003.

During their career they performed with similar acts such as King Prawn, Voodoo Glow Skulls, Mad Caddies, Bowling For Soup, Reel Big Fish and Capdown.

The final performance was held on Thursday 18 March 2004 at the Carling Academy 2 in Birmingham. The show involved former band members joining the line up to play old material. The set finished with the song "Youth on Paper", a song said to have been previously unheard at live shows.

Bassist Chris Badham now tours with The Mad Caddies. Preston was also the bassist of Beat Union formerly known as Shortcut to Newark, and has more recently joined The King Blues replacing Fruitbag as guitarist.

Farse played two reunion gigs, one at Subside Bar in Birmingham on Monday, 4 May 2009, and one at O2 Academy 2 Birmingham on Saturday, 9 May 2009. Farse also performed at the Slam Dunk Festival in Leeds on Sunday, 24 May 2009.

=== Reformation ===
On Friday 30 October 2009, Farse played their 'finale' gig at O2 Academy Birmingham. During this set, frontman Patrick proclaimed that it was not to be their last ever show, in fact, that the group were reforming, writing some new material and getting back out on the road. "Why give up doing something that you enjoy and love so much?"

== Band members ==
- Ollie Patrick – vocals, guitar (1996–2004, 2009)
- Chris Badham – bass (1996–2004, 2009) (Mad Caddies)
- Dan O'Connell – drums (1996 –1998, 1999–2004, 2009)
- Ade Preston – guitar (1998–2004, 2009) (Beat Union, The High Society, The King Blues)
- Tomas Whitehouse – guitar (1998–2004)

Past members and fill-ins

- Adam Price – drums (1998–1999)
- Dean Ashton – guitar (2009) (Shooter McGavin, Shortcut to Newark, Beat Union, The King Blues)
- Tom Rose – guitar (1996–1998)

== Discography ==
=== Studio albums ===
- Means to an End – 2001 (Sucka Punch)
- Boxing Clever – 2003 (Moon Ska Europe)

=== Music videos ===
- "Cigarette Through Polystyrene" (2003)
- "Hopskotch" (2003)
