= Born to Lose/Kamikaze =

"Born To Lose/Kamikaze"

Single by King Adora
- Released: 19 May 2003
- Genre: Punk rock, hard rock, glam rock
- Label: MH Records
- Songwriters: Matt Browne, Martyn Nelson
- Producer: Paul Talbot

King Adora singles chronology
"Bionic" (2001)	"Born To Lose/Kamikaze" (2003)	"Drag/9" Of Pure Malice" (2003)

"Born To Lose/Kamikaze" is the sixth single by British glam rock band King Adora. A double a-side, the single was released on 19 May 2003 on MH Records and reached number 68 on the UK Singles Chart. Singer Matt Browne revealed the band were "shocked" at the chart placing, which was achieved without promotion or press support. Both songs would be re-recorded for the band's 2004 second album, Who Do You Love?

== Background ==
=== Writing and recording ===
Born To Lose (originally titled Bulimic) was among the first batch of songs King Adora wrote for their second album in the autumn of 2001. The song was recorded as part of a 17-track demo for record label Superior Quality Recordings and was also recorded for a BBC Radio 1 live session at Maida Vale Studios towards the end of the year. Despite the band intentionally "stripping back" their sound on their new material after the "futuristic, electro-elements" included on Vibrate You, Born To Lose utilised a mellotron, which would be used as part of a backing track for the live and recorded versions of the song. Kamikaze was debuted on the band's November 2002 UK tour. Both songs were produced by Paul Talbot and engineered by Gareth Williams. The band later claimed that they "weren't exactly happy" with the mixes and subsequently both songs were re-recorded for their second album, Who Do You Love?, released in March 2004.

=== Themes ===
Born To Lose originally had its title changed from Bulimic because the song "isn't just based around bulimia, it has other themes of addiction and themes from the perspective of women", with Matt Browne also commenting that he "didn't want Bulimic to be thought of as Big Isn't Beautiful mark two". The song was also inspired by Sylvia Plath's The Bell Jar.

== Track listing ==
=== CD ===
1. "Born To Lose"
2. "Kamikaze"

== Personnel ==
- Matt Browne – vocals, rhythm guitar
- Martyn Nelson – lead guitar
- Robbie Grimmit – bass
- Dan Dabrowski – drums

== Production ==
Produced by Paul Talbot, engineered by Gareth Williams
