= Lowlives =

British-American grunge band

- Origin: Los Angeles, United States
- Genres: Grunge
- Years active: 2016–present
- Label: Spinefarm
- Spinoff of: The Defiled
- Members: Lee Downer; Luke Johnson; Jaxon Moore; Steve Lucarelli

Lowlives (stylised in all caps) are a British-American grunge group formed in Los Angeles in 2016 by British musicians Lee Downer and Luke Johnson and LA natives Jaxon Moore and Steve Lucarelli.

== History ==
Lee Downer relocated to Los Angeles after the break-up of his former band The Defiled, with whom he played under the pseudonym "Stitch D". After spending some time as a session musician, he met up with former Beat Union, Lostprophets and No Devotion drummer Luke Johnson, and after exchanging some demos, they decided to form a band together. Initially adopting the stage name "Lee Villain", he later recruited guitarist Jaxon Moore and former Ataris bassist Steve Lucarelli to complete the lineup, playing their first show in 2017, with their first single "Burn Forever" releasing that same year.

In 2018, the band independently released their first EP, Burn Forever, to critical acclaim. This was followed by a first festival appearance at the Reading and Leeds Festivals that summer. A number of standalone singles followed over the next few years before they signed to Spinefarm Records to release their new album in 2024.

Their first album, Freaking Out, was released 31 May 2024. A deluxe edition featuring 6 new tracks was subsequently released on 27 June 2025, supported by a UK tour in support of The Dangerous Summer.

== Members ==
- Lee Downer - guitars, vocals
- Luke Johnson - drums
- Jaxon Moore - guitars
- Steve Lucarelli - bass

== Discography ==
Extended Plays

- Burn Forever (2018)

Studio albums

- Freaking Out (2024)

Singles

- "Burn Forever" (2017)
- "Hey You" (2020)
- "Bones" (2020)
- "Gravity" (2020)
- "I Don't Like You" (2021)
- "Misery" (2022)
- "Freaking Out" (2023)
- "Liar" (2023)
- "Loser" (2024)
- "You Don't Care" (2024)
- "Only Happy When It Rains" (2026)
