= We Bring an Arsenal =

Single by Lostprophets

from the album Weapons
- Released: 4 June 2012
- Recorded: 2011
- Studio: NRG, Hollywood
- Length: 3:26 (album version)
- Label: Epic
- Songwriters: Lee Gaze; Mike Lewis; Jamie Oliver; Stu Richardson; Ian Watkins
- Producer: Ken Andrews

Lostprophets singles chronology
| "Bring 'Em Down" (2012) | "We Bring an Arsenal" (2012) | "Jesus Walks" (2012) |

"We Bring an Arsenal" is the second single from Weapons, the fifth studio album by the Welsh rock band Lostprophets, released 4 June 2012.

== Background and composition ==
The band wrote "We Bring an Arsenal" a few years before the release. Guitarist Mike Lewis said the following to Purple Revolver on 8 May 2012.

"'We Bring An Arsenal' is about us as a band, our gang mentality. We've always had that, even before we formed Lostprophets. When we were just mates growing up, we had that us vs. them, underdog mentality. That song is about that – whatever you throw at us we'll come back with more".

== Music video ==
The video for "We Bring an Arsenal" was released on 21 May 2012. The video features the band leading a group of what looks like a riot through a city, just like guitarist Mike Lewis has described, "us vs. them, underdog mentality". The band members are singing along to the song, while leading through. It is the first to feature skaters since "Rooftops", in 2006. Just like the previous video, "Bring 'Em Down", it does not show the band performing in the video. The video was shot on 3 May 2012, in London. Lostprophets also offered fans to be in the video.

== Legacy ==
Along with "Bring 'Em Down", the song was featured on the soundtrack of Forza Horizon.

== Chart positions ==
| Chart | Peak |
|---|---|
| UK Rock & Metal (OCC) | 9 |

== Personnel ==
- Ian Watkins – lead vocals
- Lee Gaze – lead guitar
- Mike Lewis – rhythm guitar
- Stu Richardson – bass guitar
- Jamie Oliver – piano, keyboard, samples, vocals
- Luke Johnson – drums, percussion
