= Daggers (The Defiled album) =

Studio album by The Defiled
- Released: 2 August 2013
- Recorded: Summer 2012, Florida
- Genre: Industrial metal, metalcore, groove metal, alternative metal
- Length: 44:43
- Label: Nuclear Blast
- Producer: Jason Suecof

The Defiled chronology
Grave Times Live (2013)	Daggers (2013)

Singles from Daggers
- 1. "Sleeper" Released: 17 March 2013; 2. "Unspoken" Released: 4 June 2013

Professional ratings
Review scores
Source	Rating
Big Cheese	8/10
Metal Blast	4/5 stars
Revolver	3/5 stars
Thrash Hits	5/6 stars

Daggers is the second and final studio album by British industrial metal band The Defiled, released in Europe on 2 August 2013, in the UK on 5 August, and in the US on 6 August. The album is their first to be released on Nuclear Blast, and first fan-funded album, funded through summer 2012 on PledgeMusic, as well as the debut of drummer Needles. The album was recorded throughout summer 2012 with producer Jason Suecof in Florida. The first single, "Sleeper", was released by the band on 17 March 2013. The second single, "Unspoken", was released along with a music video on 4 June, which was directed by Robin Fuller who also directed the video for the band's first ever single, 'The Resurrectionists'.

== Track listing ==
No.	Title	Length
1.	"Sleeper"	4:00
2.	"Unspoken"	4:05
3.	"Saints And Sinners"	3:49
4.	"As I Drown"	4:41
5.	"Porcelain"	3:23
6.	"New Approach"	3:09
7.	"Fragments of Hope"	4:30
8.	"The Infected"	4:01
9.	"The Mourning After"	4:14
10.	"Five Minutes"	4:38
11.	"No Place Like Home"	4:13

Digipak Bonus Tracks
No.	Title	Length
12.	"I Destroy What Destroys Me"	4:15
13.	"Self Under Siege"	3:25

iTunes Bonus Tracks
No.	Title	Length
12.	"As I Drown" (Live)	4:45
13.	"I Destroy What Destroys Me"	4:15
14.	"Self Under Siege"	3:25

== Personnel ==
The Defiled

- Stitch D – vocals, guitars
- The A.v.D – programming, synthesizer, keyboards, backing vocals
- Aaron Curse – guitar
- Vincent Hyde – bass guitar
- Needles – drums

Production

- Jason Suecof – production, mixing
- Eyal Levi - mixing, editing
- Scott Chalmers - artwork, photography
- Adam Da Rat - additional vocals on Infected
- Terry Bezer - additional vocals on Infected
