= Deluka =

English rock band

- Origin: Birmingham, England and Brooklyn, New York City
- Genres: Indie rock, new wave, electropop
- Years active: 2004–present
- Label: Vel Records
- Members: Ellie Innocenti; Kris Kovacs; Stevie J. Palmer; Robbie G.
- Website: deluka.com

Deluka are an English new wave band. Originally formed in Birmingham in 2004, the band moved to Brooklyn, New York, upon being signed by a US label.

The band consists of vocalist and guitarist Ellie Innocenti, programmer, producer and guitarist Kris Kovacs, bassist Robbie G, and drummer Stevie J. Palmer. Their first full-length album, Broken Sleeping Patterns, was released in 2008, which contained the song "Sleep Is Impossible" that featured in the 2008 video game Grand Theft Auto IV.

Their second full-length album, You Are the Night was released in 2010 on Vel Records. The song "Cascade" appears in the game The Sims 3 expansion pack High-End Loft Stuff. Additionally, their song "Black Magic" appeared in the 2014 video game NBA Live 15.

Deluka released three songs to their fans for free via sites such as Spinner which had been recorded in San Francisco by Gorillaz and Kasabian producer Dan the Automator.

== Band members ==
Kris Kovacs is the guitarist, songwriter, remixer and producer for Deluka. He is Deluka's co-songwriter with the bands frontwoman Ellie Innocenti and has produced and co-produced Deluka's albums and numerous remixes. Kris was born in Solihull, West Midlands and grew up in Kings Heath district of Birmingham. Kovacs studied art and graphic design and taught himself music production. Kris currently plays sunburst Fender Telecaster Deluxe which he has played in all of Deluka live shows from 2011 to 2012. Previously for live Kovacs would use a sunburst Fender Jaguar. Kovacs uses many guitar pedals to achieve his sound both on stage and in the studio, such as a Pro Co RAT, DigiTech Whammy, Electro Harmonix Mirco POG, Electro Harmonix Memory Toy, Electro Harmonix Microsynth and E-Bow. Mainly using multiple delay pedals to change the depth of his guitar sound, his pedal board consists of at least six different delay pedals.

In Deluka's "Cascade" video Kovacs is seen using a Fender Hotrod Deville, and Olympic White Fender Jaguar. In the video for Deluka's OMFG his using a sunburst Fender Jaguar whilst jumping on a motel bed. Kris also works as a remixer, and his credits include remixes for "Tik Tok" (Kesha), "Death by Diamonds and Pearls" (Band of Skulls) and "I Wanna Go" (Britney Spears).

== Career ==
2013–present:
"Home", the first single from the band's EP BONDS [released 23 June 2014] premiered 18 February 2014 on Noisey – Music by Vice. The band performed the song on VH1's Big Morning Buzz on 21 May 2014.

== Discography ==
=== Studio albums ===
Year	Album details
2008	Broken Sleeping Patterns: Released: 9 April 2008; Formats: CD, Digital Download
2010	You Are the Night: Released: 25 October 2010; Label: Vel Records; Formats: CD, Digital Download, Vinyl

=== Extended plays ===
Title	EP details
Deluka	Released: 29 June 2009
BONDS	Released: 23 June 2014

=== Singles ===
Year	Single	Peak positions		Album
Year	Single	UK	FR	Album
2014	"Home"		76	
