= The Betrayed (Lostprophets album) =

Studio album by Lostprophets
- Released: 13 January 2010
- Recorded: November 2008–May 2009 at Sunset Sound, Kingsize Soundlabs, The Cockpit and Stu Richardson's home, Los Angeles
- Genres: Alternative rock; alternative metal; hard rock
- Length: 47:01
- Labels: Visible Noise; Sony; Megaforce
- Producers: Stu Richardson; Justin Hopfer

Lostprophets chronology
Liberation Transmission (2006)	The Betrayed (2010)	Weapons (2012)

Singles from The Betrayed
- 1. "It's Not the End of the World, But I Can See It from Here" Released: 19 August 2009; 2. "Where We Belong" Released: 4 January 2010; 3. "For He's a Jolly Good Felon" Released: 11 April 2010

Japanese special edition

The Betrayed is the fourth studio album by the Welsh rock band Lostprophets, released through Visible Noise and Sony Music on 13 January 2010. Although the band initially wished to record a quick follow-up to 2006's Liberation Transmission, problems with labels and producers led to numerous delays. Consequently, tracks from the album were performed live as early as 2007, but recording was not completed until July 2009, following an entire album's worth of material being scrapped by the band.

The singles include: "It's Not the End of the World, But I Can See It from Here", "Where We Belong" and "For He's a Jolly Good Felon". "A Better Nothing" was set to be the fourth single, but it was cancelled. Although drummer Ilan Rubin left the band before the album's release, his drum tracks were still kept on the finalized product.

== Writing and recording ==
Having started writing new tracks between tour dates in 2006 and 2007, Lostprophets debuted several new songs live in 2007, including "Next Stop Atro City", "The Dead", "Weapon" and "For He's a Jolly Good Felon". The band recorded demo tracks in then-drummer Ilan Rubin's garage in San Diego, and album sessions with producer John Feldmann in Foxy Studios, Bel Air in July. A demo of "Weapon" was played on BBC Radio 1's Rock Show in August 2007, and subsequently revealed by the band to have been rejected from the album. However, a different version of this track was later released as a hidden track on the band's fifth and final studio album, Weapons. In January 2008, Kerrang! magazine revealed six new song titles, including one ("Save Yourself"), which later appeared as a bonus track on Weapons, and four ("Credible vs Incredible", "The Mourning Reign", "What Seems to Be the Problem Officer?" and "She's with the Banned") that have not been mentioned since.

Although the band had recorded a full album's worth of material in LA, reportedly spending around $500,000, they felt that the resultant recordings were too "slick and shiny", featuring layers of Pro Tools and even trumpets. Dissatisfied with this, the recordings were scrapped and the band approached Bob Rock (producer of Liberation Transmission) to produce the album in March 2008. However, Rock's hectic and unpredictable schedule, coupled with his scepticism that the songs were good enough to work on full-time, meant that they were not able to record with him until April or June 2009. The band also left their US record label, Columbia, also unconvinced of the quality of the new material, around this time, with Sony Music Entertainment taking over their actions in the American market. Faced with such adversity, Lostprophets decided to take control of the record back, with bassist Stu Richardson (who had produced the band's demo EPs in the late 90s and the self-titled debut album for Attack! Attack! earlier in 2008) leading the production alongside Justin Hopfer for the album. They continued writing in 2008, debuting eventual first single "It's Not the End of the World, But I Can See It from Here" (a title that had been mentioned since August 2007, having been one of the first songs written for the new album in 2006) and "Streets of Nowhere" live, as well as a new version of "Next Stop Atro City".

In November 2008, Lostprophets finally began the sessions for what would become The Betrayed. Following pre-production in Alabama the band moved on to Sunset Sound, Kingsize Soundlabs and Richardson's home, all in Los Angeles. The band enjoyed the freedom self-production gave them, feeling that the album is "totally representative" of them rather than being "diluted with someone else's vision". Rubin left in late 2008, with former Beat Union drummer Luke Johnson joining Lostprophets around June 2009, and filming the videos for the album's first two singles. The album recordings were announced to be completed via a MySpace blog on 31 March 2009, with interludes recorded around May. In August 2009, "If It Wasn't for Hate We'd Be Dead by Now" followed by "Dstryr/Dstryr" and "Where We Belong" were played live for the first time.

=== Child sex abuse incident ===
On an undisclosed date in 2009, Joanne Mjadzelics, the then-girlfriend of Watkins, discovered he had committed sexual abuse against a two-year-old child as the band were continuing to record The Betrayed. Mjadzelics contacted the child's parents, who had reported him to Welsh authorities (child sex offences committed by British nationals are crimes of extraterritorial jurisdiction in England and Wales), though subsequent action was not taken to investigate the incident.

== Release history ==
Due to the issues the band faced whilst making the album, its release was delayed many times. Initially the band wished for a quick-follow up to Liberation Transmission, hoping to release the album before the end of 2007. The band soon revised this timeframe, hoping to release a single in Autumn 2007 and the album as soon as possible afterwards. Before the Feldmann sessions were scrapped, the release was set for mid-2008. With the second attempt at recording underway in late 2008, the band planned to release a single in April and the album in June 2009. In May 2009 a YouTube blog reported the release to be August or September of that year.

Stu Richardson announced via Twitter that the album was totally finished on 26 July 2009. The website for the magazine Rock Sound subsequently revealed that the album had been delayed once more to early 2010, and that the first single is "It's Not the End of the World, But I Can See It from Here", due for release in October 2009. The title and several tracks were revealed in the 5 August issue of Kerrang! magazine. "It's Not the End of the World" was played for the first time on Zane Lowe's BBC Radio 1 show on 19 August, where the release date was mentioned on 12 October. This was later confirmed on the band's website. On 7 October 2009, an email from the band's mailing list stated the album is to be released on 18 January 2010, and on 9 November XFM and BBC Radio 1 confirmed the second single as "Where We Belong", to be released a fortnight prior to the album. The third single from the album was "For He's a Jolly Good Felon", which was released on 12 April 2010.

== Reception ==
Professional ratings
Aggregate scores
Source	Rating
Metacritic	67/100
Review scores
Source	Rating
AllMusic	4/5 stars
BBC	favourable
Drowned in Sound	8/10
Kerrang!	3/5 stars
NME	7/10
Q	4/5 stars
Rock Sound	8/10
Sputnikmusic	4.0/5
The Sun	4/5 stars
The Times	3/5 stars

The album received generally positive reviews from music critics. At Metacritic, which assigns a normalised rating out of 100 to reviews from mainstream critics, the album received an average score of 67, based on 10 reviews, which indicates "generally favorable reviews".

== Influences and themes ==
Since the album was first talked about in November 2006, Lostprophets have stated numerous times that the album would be "darker", "more apocalyptic", "grittier" and lyrically less optimistic and more cynical than their previous efforts. In August 2009, Stuart Richardson stated that this thematic change had been nurtured by the subsequent difficulties with "behind the scenes bullshit". Both Richardson and fellow band members Jamie Oliver and Mike Lewis stated that the new album would draw upon elements from across the band's three previous albums. Oliver considers the lyrical content of the album the main source of the "dark element", with vocalist and lyricist Ian Watkins having previously called the lyrics "nasty" and "horrible", displaying a "more honest" representation of his own character. Despite this, the album has still been described as "poppy" and "catchy", with the "massive hooks" the band are known for remaining. Like The Fake Sound of Progress and Start Something before it, The Betrayed features interludes between tracks. Several of the new songs performed live incorporated group singalong elements, with the audience encouraged to join in at live shows. "For He's a Jolly Good Felon" and "Streets of Nowhere" are "Motown-y, mod type songs", a style the band previously explored in "Can't Catch Tomorrow (Good Shoes Won't Save You This Time)". Inspiration for the new record has also been drawn from Faith No More and Refused, bands that inspired Lostprophets in the early days of their career. Similar to previous Lostprophets albums, the closing track uses instrumentation "a little different" to the band's usual style.

== Track listing ==
All lyrics written by Ian Watkins. All music composed by Lostprophets, except "It's Not the End of the World...", written by Lostprophets and Ilan Rubin, "Sunshine", written by Lostprophets and Aled Phillips.

International edition
No.	Title	Length
1.	"If It Wasn't for Hate, We'd Be Dead by Now"	2:18
2.	"Dstryr/Dstryr"	4:28
3.	"It's Not the End of the World, But I Can See It from Here"	4:19
4.	"Where We Belong"	4:37
5.	"Next Stop, Atro City"	3:02
6.	"For He's a Jolly Good Felon"	4:41
7.	"A Better Nothing"	4:46
8.	"Streets of Nowhere"	3:26
9.	"Dirty Little Heart"	5:42
10.	"Darkest Blue"	3:50
11.	"The Light That Shines Twice as Bright..."	5:52
Total length:		47:01

Japanese edition
No.	Title	Length
1.	"If It Wasn't for Hate, We'd Be Dead by Now"	2:19
2.	"Dstryr/Dstryr"	4:29
3.	"It's Not the End of the World, But I Can See It from Here"	4:20
4.	"Where We Belong"	4:37
5.	"Next Stop, Atro City"	3:02
6.	"For He's a Jolly Good Felon"	4:43
7.	"AC Ricochet" (bonus track)	3:55
8.	"A Better Nothing"	4:45
9.	"Streets of Nowhere"	3:26
10.	"Dirty Little Heart"	5:44
11.	"Sunshine" (bonus track)	4:34
12.	"Darkest Blue"	3:51
13.	"The Light That Shines Twice as Bright..." (includes a hidden track tentatively titled "The Storm Is Coming...")	19:53
Total length:		69:32

Japanese special edition bonus DVD
No.	Title	Length
1.	"It's Not the End of the World, But I Can See It from Here" (music video)
2.	"Where We Belong" (music video)
3.	"Can't Catch Tomorrow (Good Shoes Won't Save You This Time)" (music video)
4.	"We Still Kill the Old Way" (live from Summer Sonic 08)
5.	"A Town Called Hypocrisy" (live from Summer Sonic 08)
6.	"Everyday Combat" (live from Summer Sonic 08)
7.	"Last Train Home" (live from Summer Sonic 08)
8.	"Shinobi vs. Dragon Ninja" (live from Summer Sonic 08)
9.	"Burn Burn" (live from Summer Sonic 08)

== Personnel ==
Credits for The Betrayed adapted from liner notes.

Lostprophets

- Ian Watkins – lead vocals, artwork, layout
- Lee Gaze – lead guitar
- Mike Lewis – rhythm guitar
- Stu Richardson – bass guitar, production, recording, mixing
- Jamie Oliver – piano, keyboard, samples, vocals

Additional musicians

- Aled Phillips – additional writing on "Sunshine"
- Ilan Rubin – drums, percussion; additional writing on "It's Not the End of the World..."

Production

- Fred Archambault – additional engineering
- Justin Hopfer – production, recording, mixing
- Stephen Marcussen – mastering

== Charts ==
=== Weekly charts ===
Chart performance for The Betrayed
Chart (2010)	Peak position
Australian Albums (ARIA)	49
German Albums (Offizielle Top 100)	90
Greek Albums (IFPI)	18
Japanese Albums (Oricon)	18
Scottish Albums (Official Charts)	5
UK Albums (Official Charts)	3
UK Album Downloads (Official Charts)	2
UK Independent Albums (Official Charts)	1

=== Year-end charts ===
Chart (2010)	Position
UK Albums (OCC)	151

== Certifications ==
Region	Certification	Certified units/sales
United Kingdom (BPI)	Gold	100,000^{^}
^{^} Shipments figures based on certification alone.
