= Where We Belong (song) =

Single by Lostprophets

from the album The Betrayed
- Released: 4 January 2010
- Recorded: December 2008
- Studio: Sunset Sound, Los Angeles
- Length: 4:37; 3:53 (video edit); 3:37 (radio edit)
- Label: Visible Noise (UK); Sony UK (US)
- Songwriters: Lee Gaze; Mike Lewis; Jamie Oliver; Stu Richardson; Ian Watkins plus unknown writer
- Producer: Stuart Richardson

Lostprophets singles chronology
"It's Not the End of the World" (2009)	"Where We Belong" (2010)	"For He's a Jolly Good Felon" (2010)

"Where We Belong" is the second single from the album The Betrayed, the fourth studio album by the Welsh rock band Lostprophets. It was released on 4 January 2010. Vocalist Ian Watkins commented to Kerrang!: "Where We Belong might sound really happy and catchy, but if you really listen to the lyrics I could be saying that we belong in hell". The single reached No. 32 on the Official UK top 40 on 10 January 2010. The track was described by the band as their "love letter to being home", having written the song after returning to their native Wales after recording in Los Angeles.

== Track listing ==
All tracks are written by Lostprophets.

CD single
No.	Title	Length
1.	"Where We Belong" (radio edit)	3:42
2.	"Sunshine"	4:40

iTunes UK single
No.	Title	Length
1.	"Where We Belong" (radio edit)	3:42
2.	"Sunshine"	4:40
3.	"Where We Belong" (album version)	4:37

Etched 7" (limited to 1000 copies)
No.	Title	Length
1.	"Where We Belong" (radio edit)	3:42

== Music video ==
The video consists of various clips of the band performing, at the Newport Centre August 2009, and backstage, similar to the "Goodbye Tonight" video. It was the second Lostprophets video to feature drummer Luke Johnson.

== Reception ==
"Where We Belong" was described as "the most pop orientated song they have ever recorded" by Gigwise.com writer David Renshaw, who predicted that it "could well be a massive hit for the band". It was named "Single of the Week" by FemaleFirst, who described it as an "epic new single". Chris Maguire of Altsounds predicted that the song would become "one that is going to be a sing-along" at the band's gigs. The song was described as "typically workmanlike" by Clash magazine.

== Personnel ==
- Ian Watkins – lead vocals
- Lee Gaze – lead guitar
- Mike Lewis – rhythm guitar
- Stu Richardson – bass guitar
- Jamie Oliver – piano, keyboard, samples, vocals
- Ilan Rubin – drums, percussion (recording)
- Luke Johnson – drums, percussion (music video)

== Chart performance ==
On 10 January 2010, "Where We Belong" first entered the UK Singles Chart at No. 32. That week, "Where We Belong" also peaked at No. 3 on the UK Indie Chart and No. 1 on the UK Rock Chart.

== Charts ==
Chart (2010)	Peak position
UK Indie (Official Charts)	3
UK Rock & Metal (Official Charts)	1
UK Singles (Official Charts)	32

== Notes ==
- Lostprophets news
- "Where We Belong" music video on YouTube
