= P-Rock =

UK-based music TV channel

Ownership
- Owner: Moon Ska Europe (November 2002 to May 2003); Video Interactive Television (June 2003)

History
- Launched: 2002/11/28

P-Rock TV was a UK-based music channel which played mostly music videos in the Punk and Ska genres. It also featured underground rap and hardcore artists. It was first set up in November 2002 by two South London-based businessmen on a marketing budget of £2,500, with no previous TV experience. The channel continued into 2003 when it was cancelled.

== Audience ==
The channel provided an alternative to the other rock-orientated music video channels around at the time. P-Rock played videos almost constantly, in contrast to channels such as MTV2 which often features interview segments in the form of talk shows and other such programming. Also, P-Rock provided an alternative to the other channels of similar nature, in the manner of the type of music that was played. The channel played lesser-known underground bands, as well as more popular acts. Also, there was much more focus on contemporary and classic punk rock than the metal and rock that Kerrang! featured heavily in its programming.

=== Playlist ===
The channel's popularity relied partially upon the inclusion of popular artists among its track list. However, the playlist also featured a number of bands that rarely, if ever, had any time devoted to them on other channels, such as Farse. It mainly played US bands, but also included some UK bands, particularly more underground acts. Over the Christmas 2002 period, the channel notably played videos by Rancid, Lars Frederiksen and the Bastards, The Distillers, The Vandals, The Offspring, Tsunami Bomb, Jimmy Eat World and Reel Big Fish, as well as a number of artists on Drive Thru Records such as Allister and Homegrown. They later extended to underground rap-rock bands such as Cypress Hill and N.E.R.D. The channel also branched out and introduced less well known bands such as Good Riddance, Bouncing Souls, No Use for a Name and King Prawn.

=== Programming ===
The channel managed a near non-stop stream of viewer-selected videos filled on the schedule, while there were features such as the Top 10 at weekends, or late at night. The channel also allowed itself to show some of the less savoury music videos at night that were banned from daytime showing, such as the gory video to the Misfits song "Scream".

=== Complaints ===
Technical problems were rife during the channel's run, some of which being satellite failure and glitches in the videos.

=== Cancellation ===
P-Rock's co-founder and financial backer Mark Shipman, has stated that lack of commitment by advertisers led to the decision to close the channel down, when in fact the channel was cartelled by both Viacom and E-map who, at the time, were the owners of all the other music channels on the Sky platform. Although it was receiving over 600,000 viewers a week around the time of closure, the reluctance of advertisers to risk losing spots on the other music channels meant p-rock.tv without adverts was no longer financially secure.

After its original cancellation, the channel resumed playing in May 2003 for a brief while but was later cancelled a second time. Before its final cancellation, the channel was put on a permanent technical failure notice, before being closed down for the final time.
