= Who Do You Love? (album) =

Studio album by King Adora
- Released: 29 March 2004
- Recorded: 2003 at Hijack Studios (Redditch, England)
- Genres: Punk rock, hard rock, glam rock
- Length: 36:49
- Label: Discovery Recordings
- Producers: King Adora, Nigel Clark

King Adora chronology
Vibrate You (2001)	Who Do You Love? (2004)

Singles from Who Do You Love?
- 1. "Drag/9" Of Pure Malice" Released: 25 November 2003

Who Do You Love? is the second studio album by King Adora. It was released on 29 March 2004 and failed to chart. The album proved to be the band's final release before their breakup in September 2005.

== Background ==
=== Writing and recording ===
King Adora began writing their second album while still touring their debut album in 2001. A 17-track demo of new material was recorded in October 2001 at the request of their record label, Superior Quality Recordings. In October, singer Matt Browne commented that "the new album is a progression from the last one. The tunes are there and it rocks a lot harder. It's kind of the album we would have done first, but we don't mind that it's the second one". The band played new songs Tokyo Honey, Born To Lose, Asleep, The Chase, Love So Volatile and Come live on the final gigs of the Vibrate You tour, which wrapped in December 2001. In a statement later that month, the band revealed they were recording a new single (rumoured to be Tokyo Honey) and would be embarking on a tour in February 2002. The tour failed to materialise, but the band announced in mid-March that they would soon begin recording the album. No updates were provided about the sessions, but a further new song, Death By Rock 'N' Roll, was debuted at a gig in Horsham in June. Despite being dropped by Superior Quality Recordings in mid-2002, the band embarked on a UK tour in November, premiering new songs Kamikaze and Maniac Love. More new songs were premiered on a UK tour to promote the Born To Lose/Kamikaze single in May 2003, including Drag, Depression, Boy For Rent and 9" Of Pure Malice.

The band recorded the album Hijack Studios in Redditch with Dodgy singer Nigel Clark throughout 2003. In addition to the material played at their live shows, brand new songs Sweet Abandon and Fear And Loathing were recorded during the sessions. Born To Lose and Kamikaze were re-recorded for the album because the band "weren't exactly happy" with the original single versions. Mellotron made its first appearance on a King Adora album, played by Mark Wallace. Sasha Vallely provided vocals for Love So Volatile, while guitarist Martyn Nelson played piano on Sweet Abandon. Following the completion of the album, the band put the record out to the highest bidder and subsequently signed a deal with Discovery Recordings for its release.

=== Musical style and influences ===
The band's style on the album is rooted in their traditional glam rock, punk rock and hard rock sound. Matt Browne stated that Drag was a "kind of a modern day version of what The Kinks did with Lola" and had "a very glammy, T. Rex-style element to it". Browne described 9" Of Pure Malice as "upbeat rock". The singer also stated that the band had intentionally "stripped back" their sound and that the album was "not just where we were with Vibrate You, but where we are now".

=== Title and themes ===
The album title Who Do You Love? is taken from the lyrics of the opening track, Drag. Themes present on the album include sex, drugs, rock 'n' roll, depression and bulimia. Born To Lose had its title changed from Bulimia because Browne felt the song "was about more than just bulimia, but all types of self control, self obsession and addiction. It also gathered inspiration from Plath's The Bell Jar and that continual female struggle in patriarchal hell".

== Legacy ==
The band look back on the album with mixed opinions. Bassist Robbie Grimmit was positive, saying "the end quality wasn't as good as it could have been, but I think the songs are certainly there". Martyn Nelson felt the album was depressing, while Matt Browne believed that there were some good songs, but said the album "is not recorded well, is not thought out well and sounds like a band that are on their way down". BBC radio DJ Steve Lamacq commented that the sound of Who Do You Love? was not far away from The Darkness, a glam rock band who were successful in 2003 and 2004.

== Track listing ==
All tracks are written by Matt Browne & Martyn Nelson.

No.	Title	Length
1.	"Drag"	3:09
2.	"9" Of Pure Malice"	2:18
3.	"Born To Lose"	2:58
4.	"Kamikaze"	2:56
5.	"Depression"	3:25
6.	"Sweet Abandon"	3:11
7.	"Boy For Rent"	2:28
8.	"Maniac Love"	2:41
9.	"Come"	1:56
10.	"Death By Rock 'N' Roll"	2:20
11.	"Fear And Loathing"	3:07
12.	"Love So Volatile"	3:20
13.	"Asleep"	3:06

== Personnel ==
- Matt Browne – vocals, guitar
- Martyn Nelson – guitar, piano
- Robbie Grimmit – bass
- Dan Dabrowski – drums
- Sasha Vallely – vocals on Love So Volatile
- Mark Wallace – mellotron on Born To Lose, Sweet Abandon & Fear And Loathing.

== Production ==
- Produced and mixed by King Adora and Nigel Clark

== Singles ==
- 2003: Drag/9" Of Pure Malice (25 November 2003)

== Tour ==
Despite playing the bulk of the material from Who Do You Love? live throughout 2001, 2002 and 2003, King Adora's tour to support the album did not begin in earnest until November 2003, when they embarked on a UK tour to support the Drag single. Setlists in the early part of the tour were divided between new songs from Who Do You Love? and the singles released from Vibrate You. Sweet Abandon was debuted at a pre-release gig for the album in London on 23 March 2004 and would be played at most dates through to the end of the tour. The album was supported with a month-long UK tour in April and May 2004. Love So Volatile returned to the setlist in April 2004, having not been played live since December 2001. The band played the only mainland European gig of their career in July, appearing alongside Kaiser Chiefs, Mystery Juice and Goldblade at the Fender Fest in Moscow, Russia. New songs Revenge (later recorded and released by The High Society), Backstage and a cover of Nancy Sinatra's These Boots Are Made For Walkin' were added to the set towards the end of the year.

Date	City	Country	Venue
13 November 2003	Lincoln	United Kingdom	University
18 November 2003	Bristol	United Kingdom	Fleece & Firkin
19 November 2003	Birmingham	United Kingdom	Academy 2
20 November 2003	Cardiff	United Kingdom	Barfly
21 November 2003	Leeds	United Kingdom	Cockpit
22 November 2003	London	United Kingdom	Islington Academy 2
24 November 2003	Manchester	United Kingdom	Roadhouse
25 November 2003	Glasgow	United Kingdom	King Tut's Wah Wah Hut
26 November 2003	Newcastle upon Tyne	United Kingdom	University
28 November 2003	York	United Kingdom	Fibbers
29 November 2003	Northampton	United Kingdom	Soundhaus
23 March 2004	London	United Kingdom	Infinity Club
2 April 2004	Newbury	United Kingdom	Corn Exchange
21 April 2004	Norwich	United Kingdom	Arts Centre
22 April 2004	Stoke-on-Trent	United Kingdom	Sugarmill
23 April 2004	High Wycombe	United Kingdom	White Horse
24 April 2004	Winchester	United Kingdom	Railway Inn
25 April 2004	Leicester	United Kingdom	Charlotte
26 April 2004	Oxford	United Kingdom	Zodiac
28 April 2004	Doncaster	United Kingdom	Leopard
29 April 2004	Northampton	United Kingdom	Soundhaus
30 April 2004	York	United Kingdom	Fibbers
1 May 2004	Sunderland	United Kingdom	Bar 36
3 May 2004	Edinburgh	United Kingdom	Venue
4 May 2004	Aberdeen	United Kingdom	Lemon Tree
5 May 2004	Glasgow	United Kingdom	King Tut's Wah Wah Hut
7 May 2004	Newcastle upon Tyne	United Kingdom	Northumbria University
10 May 2004	Liverpool	United Kingdom	Academy 2
11 May 2004	Cardiff	United Kingdom	Barfly
12 May 2004	Exeter	United Kingdom	Cavern
13 May 2004	Bristol	United Kingdom	Fleece & Firkin
15 May 2004	Coventry	United Kingdom	Jailhouse
19 May 2004	Nottingham	United Kingdom	Rock City Basement
20 May 2004	London	United Kingdom	Underworld
21 May 2004	Birmingham	United Kingdom	Academy 2
11 June 2004	Cambridge	United Kingdom	Robinson College
31 July 2004	Moscow	Russia	Bolotnaya Square^{[1]}
19 October 2004	Birmingham	United Kingdom	Academy 2
19 December 2004	Birmingham	United Kingdom	Academy 2
20 December 2004	London	United Kingdom	Underworld

- 1 Fender Fest.
