= 1888 (EP) =

EP by The Defiled
- Released: 26 October 2009
- Genre: Metalcore, groove metal, industrial metal, thrash metal
- Length: 24:10
- Label: IATDE

The Defiled chronology
1888 (2009)	Grave Times (2011)

1888 is the debut EP by English metal band The Defiled. It was released on 26 October 2009 through the IATDE Records. The band's first music video for the song "The Resurrectionists" was released a couple of months after the EP was released. This same song was re-recorded for their debut album, Grave Times, which was released on 14 February 2011. The band toured with the Jägermeister Stage and headlined this stage during the 2009 Sonisphere Festival.

== Critical reception ==
Professional ratings
Review scores
Source	Rating
Kerrang!	(4/5)

"The Defiled's meld of industrial, Marilyn Manson-esque swagger with a more serrated hardcore edge has seen them become lauded as one of the UK's most aggressively vital new live bands," according to Kerrang!'s October 2009 review. "Dealing exclusively in a vicious-chorus/big-verse songwriting format, the short running time is more blast than whimper... What you discover is a band with more witty lyrical nous and thematic depth than their energetic stage presence would suggest," wrote reviewer Sam Law, giving it 4 K's out of 5.

== Track listing ==
No.	Title	Length
1.	"The Resurrectionists"	4:56
2.	"The End of Innocence"	4:33
3.	"1888"	4:33
4.	"Permanent Reminder"	4:16
5.	"Red Tape"	5:44
Total length:		24.10
