= Drag/9" of Pure Malice =

"Drag/9" Of Pure Malice"

Single by King Adora

from the album Who Do You Love?
- B-side: "Love's Like Suicide"
- Released: 24 November 2003
- Recorded: Hijack Studios (Redditch, England)
- Genre: Punk rock, hard rock, glam rock
- Label: Discovery Recordings
- Songwriter(s): Matt Browne, Martyn Nelson
- Producer(s): King Adora, Nigel Clark

King Adora singles chronology
"Born To Lose/Kamikaze" (2003)	"Drag/9" Of Pure Malice" (2003)

"Drag/9" Of Pure Malice" is the seventh single by British glam rock band King Adora. A double A-side, the single was released on 24 November 2003 on Discovery Recordings and reached number 85 on the UK Singles Chart. The single was the only to be taken from the band's second album Who Do You Love?, released in March 2004.

== Background ==
=== Writing and recording ===
"Drag" and "9" Of Pure Malice" were debuted on King Adora's May 2003 UK tour supporting the "Born To Lose/Kamikaze" single. The single was originally slated for a July 2003 release, which was later pushed back until November after the band signed to Discovery Recordings. While writing their second album between 2001 and 2003, the band intentionally "stripped back" the sound of their new material, with singer Matt Browne commenting "we wanted (Drag) to sound like that and we wanted something musically that would fit the song’s lyrics. It has a very glammy, T. Rex-style element to it". Browne also stated that Drag was always intended to be the lead single for Who Do You Love?, saying "we felt that it was an exciting enough comeback single to do". Both songs were recorded with Nigel Clark at Hijack Studios in Redditch during 2003.

=== Themes ===
Browne revealed that "Drag is kind of a modern day version of what The Kinks did with Lola, that whole one person by day, another by night (thing) has always fascinated me. I just developed it into a disturbing love story and a celebration of glamour". The band also said Drag "is a celebration of both dressing up and overcoming bigotry about gender blurring". Bassist Robbie Grimmit joked that 9" Of Pure Malice "reminds me somewhat of myself. I assume that's where Maxi got the lyrics from!".

== B-side ==
The single was released with one B-side, "Love's Like Suicide". The song was co-produced by the band and Dan Huffman at Bridge Studios in the West Midlands and was never performed live.

== Reaction ==
R*E*P*E*A*T fanzine commented that "Drag" incorporated "neo-T. Rex-isms" and "9" Of Pure Malice" is "just over two minutes of glorious, raucous sleaze". LeftLion called "9" Of Pure Malice" a "gutsy adrenaline-fuelled classic".

== Track listing ==
=== CD ===
1. "Drag"
2. "9" Of Pure Malice"
3. "Love's Like Suicide"

=== 7" ===
1. "Drag"
2. "9" Of Pure Malice"

== Personnel ==
- Matt Browne – vocals, rhythm guitar
- Martyn Nelson – lead guitar
- Robbie Grimmit – bass
- Dan Dabrowski – drums

== Production ==
- Drag, 9" Of Pure Malice – Produced and mixed by King Adora and Nigel Clark
- Love's Like Suicide – Produced and mixed by King Adora and Dan Huffman
