= Vibrate You =

Studio album by King Adora
- Released: 21 May 2001
- Recorded: November – December 2000 at Sawmills Studios (Golant, Cornwall)
- Genres: Punk rock, hard rock, glam rock
- Length: 36:26
- Label: Superior Quality Recordings
- Producer: John Cornfield

King Adora chronology
Vibrate You (2001)	Who Do You Love? (2004)

Singles from Vibrate You
- 1. "Big Isn't Beautiful" Released: 31 July 2000; 2. "Smoulder" Released: 23 October 2000; 3. "Suffocate" Released: 19 February 2001; 4. "Bionic" Released: 14 May 2001

Vibrate You is the debut studio album by King Adora. It was released on 21 May 2001 on Superior Quality Recordings and reached number 30 on the UK Albums Chart. Produced by John Cornfield at Sawmills Studios in Cornwall, the album received mixed reviews from critics.

== Background ==
=== Writing and recording ===
Writing for the album began when Matt Browne and Martyn Nelson formed King Adora in Birmingham, England in 1998. The first song the pair wrote was Friday Night Explodes, which explored their experiences of working all week and getting "trashed" every Friday night. After signing to Superior Quality Recordings in 2000, the band released the Bionic/The Law, Big Isn't Beautiful and Smoulder singles, playing the singles and other newly written songs at their live shows. An attempt at recording the album was halted at the request of Superior Quality Recordings due to the band's drunkenness, resulting in the decision to send the band to the secluded Sawmills Studios in Cornwall in late 2000. John Cornfield was chosen to produce and mix the record. The surroundings at Sawmills proved to be a welcome change of pace for the band, finding inspiration from images on the walls of the studio's previous clients (The Stone Roses, Muse, The Verve) and putting on a Christmas party, which was featured in Melody Maker.

According to Browne, the album took "six or seven weeks" to record. The band arrived at the studio with the majority of the songs already written and arranged. Ten songs recorded in the sessions are present on the album, with previous singles Bionic, The Law and Big Isn't Beautiful (originally recorded and produced by Chris Sheldon) being re-recorded, to add "a little bit more balls". Smoulder was unchanged from its single version, which had been produced and mixed by John Cornfield. Cornfield recalled that the band were "pretty good at getting themselves vibed up, into it and going for it" and that he tried to push them into more of an "angry rock" direction, away from their glam roots. An "Elvis impression" was included on We Are Heroes, allegedly without the band knowing. The Mevo Gissey Choir was used on Music Takes You, with the band stating "we were going to get a big gospel choir in and try some other things, but we said we wanted something really powerful and deep". Bassist Robbie Grimmit commented that the song was "our rock epic". Future single Suffocate was written during the sessions and dealt with the death of Browne's girlfriend. Dabrowski revealed the band "tried" to record cover versions at the sessions. Two previously released b-sides were included on an enhanced version of the album as bonus tracks. The enhanced version also included an EPK (featuring home video footage) and music videos for Big Isn't Beautiful, Smoulder, Suffocate and Bionic. The album was mastered by Kevin Metcalfe at The Soundmasters, London.

=== Musical style and influences ===
The band's style on the album is rooted in glam rock, punk rock and hard rock. The band members credited Pavement, Sonic Youth, Pixies as the bands that made them want to be musicians, also stating "we had a fascination with the New York scene in the 70s going all the way up to the grunge scene". The band pointed out that their sound was a combination of their four personalities, saying "when we used to rehearse, it was whatever comes naturally on stage, just do it. If we ever wrote a song that was three and a half minutes, we'd rehearse it twice and think 'this is so boring and long'. So we'd get rid of choruses and just make it more immediate". The music press noted elements of Guns N' Roses, Mötley Crüe, Alice Cooper, T-Rex, David Bowie, Blondie and early Manic Street Preachers in the band's music. The band also added "futuristic electro-elements" to their sound. Drum machines were present on the album, featuring on Aftertime, The Law, We Are Heroes, Music Takes You and Suffocate. Synthesisers featured on Friday Night Explodes and We Are Heroes, while a police siren sample was utilised on The Law.

=== Title and themes ===
The album title Vibrate You is taken from the lyrics of the opening track, Smoulder. Themes present on the album include sex, drugs, rock 'n' roll, relationships, self-obsession, sleaze and anorexia. Browne stated that Big Isn't Beautiful "was from the point of view from an anorexic male. It's quite honest, but because it's controversial, people get a bit angry about it". The band described Friday Night Explodes as being "a speed and alcohol fuelled celebration of excess, placing drugs on their rightful pedestal. A sort of pre-band autobiography". Bionic, Aftertime, We Are Heroes and Music Takes You celebrated the bond between the band members and their fans. Many of the songs dealt with various forms of sex, including The Law ("sex with a policewoman"), Supermuffdiver (oral sex) and Asthmatic (auto-erotic asphyxiation). Whether is "anti-machismo", "anti-lad culture" and "about feeling comfortable in expressing yourself". Smoulder and Suffocate explored relationships filled with despair, fear and desire.

== Reception ==
Professional ratings
Review scores
Source	Rating
AllMusic	2.5/5 stars
Drowned in Sound	4/10 stars
The Guardian	2/5 stars
NME	6/10 stars

The album received mixed reviews, the Southern Reporter commenting "how can you quibble at a band who expend more energy in 40 minutes than Pink Floyd did in a career? What's more it's not wasted effort". The NME's review was mixed, Steven Wells stating that "to send King Adora over the top with a record like this would be tantamount to murder". Drowned In Sound were less positive, rating the album 4/10. AllMusic gave the album 2.5/5, saying the band were "in danger of riding off into the sunset as the neo-glam indie equivalent of the Rutles". The Guardian were negative, stating "the Adora (who named themselves after a vibrator) are too tentative to carry off either the look or the sound".

== Legacy ==
Matt Browne would look back on the album with disdain in the years following its release, saying "I probably would have used different recording techniques, possibly included a couple of different songs, some songs I didn’t feel were that strong and the artwork I absolutely loathed". He also went on to say that "songs like Whether and Aftertime could have been brought out better. They’re both good songs, but I feel they could have been made a lot heavier. I don’t feel (John Cornfield) who produced it really got to grips with those songs".

== Track listing ==
All tracks are written by Matt Browne & Martyn Nelson.

No.	Title	Length
1.	"Smoulder"	2:07
2.	"Bionic"	2:13
3.	"Big Isn't Beautiful"	2:42
4.	"Friday Night Explodes"	2:40
5.	"Aftertime"	2:38
6.	"The Law"	1:47
7.	"Whether"	3:05
8.	"We Are Heroes"	3:31
9.	"Supermuffdiver"	2:00
10.	"Asthmatic"	1:58
11.	"Music Takes You"	4:55
12.	"Suffocate"	2:33

Enhanced CD bonus tracks

No.	Title	Length
13.	"Scream And Shout"	1:51
14.	"Aceface"	2:26

== Personnel ==
- Matt Browne – vocals, guitar
- Martyn Nelson – guitar, backing vocals
- Robbie Grimmit – bass
- Dan Dabrowski – drums
- Mevo Gissey Choir – vocals on Music Takes You

== Production ==
- Tracks 1, 2, 3, 4, 5, 6, 7, 8, 9, 10, 11, 12 – Produced and mixed by John Cornfield
- Track 13 – Produced by King Adora, engineered by John Rivers and Mark Thomas
- Track 14 – Produced by King Adora and Dan Sprigg, mixed by Dan Sprigg and Jamie Travers, engineered by Mark Thomas

== Singles ==
- 2000: Big Isn't Beautiful (31 July 2000)
- 2000: Smoulder (23 October 2000)
- 2001: Suffocate (19 February 2001)
- 2001: Bionic (14 May 2001)

== Tour ==
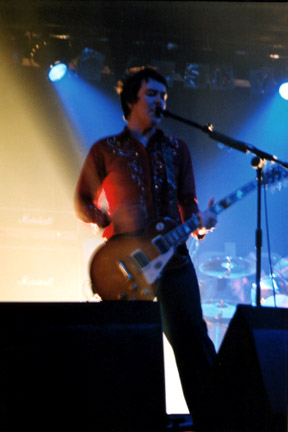
Martyn Nelson performing at the Electric Ballroom in London on 13 December 2001.

King Adora began their tour supporting Vibrate You in late January 2001 and wrapped up in mid-December. The biggest headlining show of the tour came on 19 May, when demand forced the band's London gig to be moved from the Mean Fiddler to the Astoria. Setlists for the tour consisted of material from Vibrate You, with b-sides also receiving airplay, including Scream And Shout, Don't Trust The Ones You Love, Freak, Aceface and White Noise Babies. Music Takes You was the only song from the album not played on the tour. New songs were premiered later in the tour (including Born To Lose, Love So Volatile, Asleep and Come) and would see release on the band's second album Who Do You Love? in 2004. Other new songs played on the tour, but never officially released, included The Chase and Tokyo Honey.

Date	City	Country	Venue
United Kingdom Leg #1
27 January 2001	Glasgow	United Kingdom	King Tut's Wah Wah Hut
28 January 2001	Aberdeen	United Kingdom	Glow 303
29 January 2001	Edinburgh	United Kingdom	Venue
30 January 2001	Manchester	United Kingdom	Roadhouse
NME Brat Awards
1 February 2001	London	United Kingdom	Astoria
United Kingdom Leg #2
2 February 2001	Liverpool	United Kingdom	Lomax
3 February 2001	Sheffield	United Kingdom	Leadmill
4 February 2001	Hull	United Kingdom	Adelphi
6 February 2001	Stoke-on-Trent	United Kingdom	Sugarmill
7 February 2001	Northampton	United Kingdom	Roadmender
8 February 2001	Leicester	United Kingdom	Charlotte
10 February 2001	Exeter	United Kingdom	Cavern
11 February 2001	Portsmouth	United Kingdom	Wedgewood Rooms
12 February 2001	Norwich	United Kingdom	Arts Centre
13 February 2001	Birmingham	United Kingdom	Academy 2
15 February 2001	London	United Kingdom	Dingwalls
16 February 2001	Coventry	United Kingdom	Colosseum
17 February 2001	Leeds	United Kingdom	Rocket
12 March 2001	London	United Kingdom	Sound Republic
8 April 2001	York	United Kingdom	Fibbers
11 April 2001	Bedford	United Kingdom	Esquires
12 April 2001	London	United Kingdom	Garage
23 April 2001	Birmingham	United Kingdom	Jug Of Ale
25 April 2001	Norwich	United Kingdom	Arts Centre
26 April 2001	Oxford	United Kingdom	Zodiac
27 April 2001	Sheffield	United Kingdom	Leadmill
28 April 2001	Liverpool	United Kingdom	Stanley Theatre
30 April 2001	Newcastle	United Kingdom	University
1 May 2001	Edinburgh	United Kingdom	Venue
2 May 2001	Glasgow	United Kingdom	King Tut's Wah Wah Hut
3 May 2001	Dundee	United Kingdom	On East Air
5 May 2001	Aberdeen	United Kingdom	Glow 303
6 May 2001	Manchester	United Kingdom	Hop & Grape
7 May 2001	Leeds	United Kingdom	Cockpit
11 May 2001	Brighton	United Kingdom	Concorde 2
12 May 2001	Colchester	United Kingdom	Arts Centre
13 May 2001	Cardiff	United Kingdom	Clwb Ifor Bach
15 May 2001	Exeter	United Kingdom	Cavern
16 May 2001	Portsmouth	United Kingdom	Wedgewood Rooms
17 May 2001	Leicester	United Kingdom	Charlotte
19 May 2001	London	United Kingdom	Astoria^{[1]}
20 May 2001	York	United Kingdom	Fibbers^{[2]}
1 June 2001	London	United Kingdom	Scala
Supporting Queens Of The Stone Age
5 June 2001	Norwich	United Kingdom	University of East Anglia
6 June 2001	Folkestone	United Kingdom	Leas Cliff Hall
7 June 2001	Newport	United Kingdom	Newport Centre
10 June 2001	Birmingham	United Kingdom	Academy
11 June 2001	Portsmouth	United Kingdom	Guildhall
12 June 2001	Manchester	United Kingdom	Academy
13 June 2001	London	United Kingdom	Brixton Academy
United Kingdom Leg #3
3 July 2001	Bristol	United Kingdom	Fleece & Firkin
7 July 2001	Balado	United Kingdom	Balado Park^{[3]}
10 August 2001	Edinburgh	United Kingdom	Princes Street Gardens^{[4]}
14 August 2001	Northampton	United Kingdom	Roadmender
Asia
18 August 2001	Chiba City	Japan	Chiba Marine Stadium^{[5]}
19 August 2001	Osaka	Japan	Maishima Sports Island^{[5]}
21 August 2001	Tokyo	Japan	Liquid Rooms
United Kingdom Leg #4
24 August 2001	Reading	United Kingdom	Little John's Farm^{[6]}
25 August 2001	Leeds	United Kingdom	Bramham Park^{[7]}
26 August 2001	Glasgow	United Kingdom	Glasgow Green^{[8]}
31 October 2001	Birmingham	United Kingdom	Sanctuary^{[9]}
22 November 2001	Peterborough	United Kingdom	Metropolis Lounge
7 December 2001	London	United Kingdom	Rex
12 December 2001	Birmingham	United Kingdom	Academy 2
13 December 2001	London	United Kingdom	Electric Ballroom
14 December 2001	Manchester	United Kingdom	Hop & Grape
15 December 2001	Glasgow	United Kingdom	King Tut's Wah Wah Hut

- 1 Venue upgraded from Mean Fiddler.
- 2 Rescheduled from 8 May 2001.
- 3 T In The Park.
- 4 Edinburgh Festival Fringe.
- 5 Summer Sonic Festival.
- 6 Reading Festival.
- 7 Leeds Festival.
- 8 Gig On The Green.
- 9 BBC Radio 1 One Live in Birmingham.
