= Smoulder (song) =

Single by King Adora

from the album Vibrate You
- B-side: "Massive Ego", "Loved"
- Released: 23 October 2000
- Recorded: Sawmills Studios
- Genre: Punk rock, hard rock, glam rock
- Length: 2:07
- Label: Superior Quality Recordings
- Songwriters: Matt Browne, Martyn Nelson
- Producer: John Cornfield

King Adora singles chronology
"Big Isn't Beautiful" (2000)	"Smoulder" (2000)	"Suffocate" (2001)

"Smoulder" is the third single by British glam rock band King Adora. The single was released on 23 October 2000 on Superior Quality Recordings and reached number 62 on the UK Singles Chart. The song would later be included as the opening track on the band's 2001 debut album, Vibrate You.

== Background ==
=== Writing and recording ===
Smoulder appeared in King Adora's live sets during 2000 and would go on to be played at every show for the rest of their career. The song was recorded at Sawmills Studios in Cornwall and produced and mixed by John Cornfield.

=== Themes ===
The band stated that Smoulder is "about never being able to have what you want. About hiding from yourself. About hiding your despair in sleaze and pointless sex". Matt Browne commented that the song is "about two people who are perfectly matched, emotionally, sexually, spiritually connecting, that perfect thing. But at the same time the more intense the passion, the more intense the paranoia and the destructive side. It's a negative form of love, but it started out trying to put it on a pedestal. You can't escape the destruction that it causes". The song is also based on Browne's personal experiences, saying "there's no point falling for someone unless it's passionately, no matter how fleeting. How many times has it happened? Maybe twenty".

== B-sides ==
Two b-sides were released on the single, Massive Ego and Loved. Both songs were recorded at Woodbine Street Recording Studios in Royal Leamington Spa. John Rivers engineered and co-produced the recordings with the band. Neither song was performed live.

== Video ==
The Smoulder release was accompanied by King Adora's second music video. The video features the band playing the song in a cramped cardboard box, which had been dropped from the sky onto a pavement. Towards the end of the song, the box is picked up by removals men and placed into a stack of boxes in the back of a truck, from which it falls.

== Reaction ==
Melody Maker described the track as "a Supergrass-meet-the-Pixies affair with, crucially, the Daleks on backing vocals and thus the most deranged and brilliantly libidinous pop fancy since Gay Dad's good song".

== Track listing ==
=== CD ===
1. "Smoulder"
2. "Massive Ego"
3. "Loved"

=== 7" ===
1. "Smoulder"
2. "Massive Ego"

== Personnel ==
- Matt Browne – vocals, rhythm guitar
- Martyn Nelson – lead guitar
- Robbie Grimmit – bass
- Dan Dabrowski – drums

== Production ==
- Smoulder – Produced and mixed by John Cornfield
- Massive Ego, Loved – Produced by King Adora and John Rivers, engineered by John Rivers
