= Grave Times =

2011 album by the Defiled

Studio album by The Defiled
- Released: 14 February 2011
- Recorded: 2010
- Studio: Avdis Studios
- Genre: Metalcore, groove metal, industrial metal, thrash metal
- Length: 51:33
- Producer: The Defiled

The Defiled chronology
1888 (2009)	Grave Times (2011)	Daggers (2013)

Singles from Grave Times
- 1. "Call to Arms" Released: 22 January 2011; 2. "Black Death" Released: 18 December 2012 Music video: 17 October 2011; 3. "Blood Sells" Released: 18 December 2012 Music video: 30 November 2012

Grave Times is the debut album by English metal band The Defiled. It was released on 14 February 2011 through Raise the Game and with Metal Hammer magazine as a free cover mount disc along with the January issue. So far music videos have been released for 3 tracks: Call To Arms, Black Death and Blood Sells. Black Death and Blood Sells were both released as singles with remixes and alternative versions on 18 December 2012. It is also JC Brutal's last release with the band, and Vincent Hyde's first.

== Track List ==
All lyrics are written by The A.v.D and Stitch D; all music is composed by The Defiled.

No.	Title	Length
1.	"In the Land of Fools"	7:08
2.	"Call to Arms"	5:22
3.	"Blood Sells"	3:54
4.	"Black Death"	4:40
5.	"The Resurrectionists"	4:50
6.	"Metropolis"	5:05
7.	"Locked in Freedom"	4:48
8.	"The Ill Disposed"	3:41
9.	"In Your Name"	5:21
10.	"Final Sleep"	6:41
Total length:		51:33

1888 (Reworks EP) (bonus Disc)
No.	Title	Length
1.	"The Resurrectionists (No Morals ReWork)"	4:41
2.	"The End of Innocence (The A.v.D. Chop-Shop ReWork)"	2:50
3.	"1888 (Low Morals ReWork)"	2:56
4.	"Permanent Reminder (Immoral Brakes Mix)"	5:03
5.	"Red Tape (Demoralized ReWork)"	5:12
Total length:		20:43

== Personnel ==
The Defiled

- Stitch D - vocals, guitar
- The AvD - programming, synthesizer, keyboards, backing vocals
- Aaron Curse - guitar
- Vincent Hyde - bass guitar
- JC Brutal - drums

Production

- Dan Weller - mixing
