= Friday Night Explodes =

EP by King Adora
- Released: 3 August 2001
- Recorded: Sawmills Studios, Cornwall
- Genre: Punk rock, hard rock, glam rock
- Label: Superior Quality Recordings
- Producer: John Cornfield

"Friday Night Explodes" is an EP by British glam rock band King Adora, released on 3 August 2001 on Superior Quality Recordings. It was the final release from the band's debut album Vibrate You.

== Background ==
=== Writing and recording ===
"Friday Night Explodes" was the first song written by Matt Browne and Martyn Nelson when the pair formed King Adora in 1998. The song was inspired by the pair's experiences of working all week and getting drunk at Snobs nightclub in Birmingham every Friday night. The song was recorded in late 2000 at Sawmills Studios in Cornwall during the sessions for King Adora's debut album Vibrate You and was produced and mixed by John Cornfield.

=== Themes ===
The band described Friday Night Explodes as "a speed and alcohol fuelled celebration of excess, placing drugs on their rightful pedestal. About sleazy club culture. About addiction. A sort of pre-band autobiography".

== Other songs ==
"Friday Night Explodes" is backed by off-album tracks "White Noise Babies", "Saffron" and a remix. "White Noise Babies" appeared in the band's live sets during August 2001.

== Release ==
On 3 June 2001, King Adora's PR company Hall Or Nothing announced that the band would release a new single in July 2001. A week later, the release date was confirmed as 16 July. The track list for the single was released on 11 July. The single release was cancelled shortly afterwards, as the band "relinquished the chance of a third Top 40 hit to give "Friday Night Explodes" and its b-sides away to rock fans as a download on the net. They want to be heard and think the vibrant UK scene deserves attention". Along with the free downloads, an Enhanced CD version of the EP was made with a limited run of 2000 copies.

== Video ==
The release was accompanied by a music video, directed by Dan Crouch.

== Track listing ==
=== Enhanced CD ===
1. "Friday Night Explodes"
2. "White Noise Babies"
3. "Friday Night Explodes" (Six Million Dollar mix)
4. "Saffron"
5. "Friday Night Explodes" (video)

== Personnel ==
- Matt Browne – vocals, rhythm guitar
- Martyn Nelson – lead guitar
- Robbie Grimmit – bass
- Dan Dabrowski – drums

== Production ==
- "Friday Night Explodes" – Produced and mixed by John Cornfield
- Mark Thomas – engineer
