= 4:AM Forever =

Single by Lostprophets

from the album Liberation Transmission
- Released: 23 April 2007
- Length: 4:27
- Label: Columbia; Visible Noise
- Songwriters: Lee Gaze; Mike Lewis; Jamie Oliver; Stu Richardson; Ian Watkins
- Producer: Bob Rock

Lostprophets singles chronology
"Can't Catch Tomorrow" (2006)	"4:AM Forever" (2007)	"It's Not the End of the World" (2009)

"4:AM Forever" is a song by the Welsh rock band Lostprophets, released on 23 April 2007 as the fourth and final single from their third studio album Liberation Transmission (2006).

== Track listing ==
CD1
No.	Title	Length
1.	"4:AM Forever"	4:30
2.	"Every Song"	4:12

Vinyl 1
No.	Title	Length
1.	"4:AM Forever"	4:30
2.	"Never Know" ("Heaven for the Weather, Hell for the Company" demo)	5:10

Vinyl 2
No.	Title	Length
1.	"4:AM Forever"	4:30

(The B-side of this edition was an etched design rather than containing music).

Digital download
No.	Title	Length
1.	"4:AM Forever" (radio edit)	4:17
2.	"Every Song"	4:12
3.	"Never Know" (demo)	5:10
4.	"Going Underground" (The Jam cover)	3:21

Unlike previous Lostprophets singles, there were two 7" vinyl releases and only one CD for this single. Additionally, a special download release of the single was available from 4:00 am on 28 April 2007, including a cover of "Going Underground" by The Jam. This release was limited to 1500 copies. An alternate version of the cover of "Going Underground" can also be heard on the compilation Punk the Clock, Vol. 3. Also, exclusive live versions of "4:AM Forever" were made available for download along with "Every Song" and "Never Know" on 16 April 2007.

In an interview on Popworld, Ian Watkins stated that the song was called "4:AM Forever" because 4:AM is the hour in the night that most people die, known as "the witching hour".

== Music video ==
The video features the band members playing inside an old house, except for frontman Ian Watkins, who is sitting in the rain outside on the front porch.

== Personnel ==
- Ian Watkins – lead vocals
- Lee Gaze – lead guitar
- Mike Lewis – rhythm guitar
- Stu Richardson – bass guitar
- Jamie Oliver – piano, keyboard, samples, vocals
- Josh Freese – drums, percussion (recording)
- Ilan Rubin – drums, percussion (music video)

== Chart positions ==
Chart (2007)	Peak position
UK Singles Chart	34
UK Rock & Metal (OCC)	1
European Hot 100	96
