= Big Isn't Beautiful =

2000 single by King Adora

Single by King Adora

from the album Vibrate You
- B-side: "Scream And Shout"; "Comfortable"
- Released: 31 July 2000
- Genre: Punk rock; hard rock; glam rock
- Length: 2:41
- Label: Superior Quality Recordings
- Songwriter(s): Matt Browne; Martyn Nelson
- Producer(s): Chris Sheldon

King Adora singles chronology
"Bionic/The Law" (2000)	"Big Isn't Beautiful" (2000)	"Smoulder" (2000)

"Big Isn't Beautiful" is the second single by British glam rock band King Adora, released on 31 July 2000 by Superior Quality Recordings and reaching number 94 on the UK Singles Chart. It courted some controversy for its portrayal of anorexia nervosa and was remade for the band's 2001 debut album, Vibrate You.

== Writing and recording ==
Big Isn't Beautiful was recorded at Great Linford Manor in Great Linford, Buckinghamshire in the first half of 2000 and was produced and mixed by Chris Sheldon. The song featured the first use of piano by King Adora and also included drum machine samples, which were credited on the single's sleeve to "Roland".

== Themes ==
Big Isn't Beautiful is written from the point of view of an anorexic male, the band stating it was about "self-obsession and self-loathing at its most destructive". Singer Matt Browne responded to criticism: "Just because you’re not singing about something safe, people say, ‘you can’t do that’. People just misunderstood the perspective I was writing from. The title supposed to be tongue in cheek. It's just a song." He went on to say Big Isn't Beautiful "just deals with that obsessive compulsive sort of personality, it's not meant to be offensive in the slightest, it's very heartfelt and sincere as far as I'm concerned and I'm very very proud of what I wrote".

== B-sides ==
Two b-sides were released on the single, Scream And Shout and Comfortable. Both songs were recorded at Woodbine Street Recording Studios in Royal Leamington Spa and produced by the band. John Rivers engineered the recordings. Scream And Shout was regularly played at the band's live shows and was included as a bonus track on the Enhanced CD version of the band's debut album, Vibrate You.

== Video ==
The Big Isn't Beautiful release was accompanied by King Adora's first music video, directed by Moritz. Part of the video was shot in the window of a branch of Ann Summers, across Tottenham Court Road from the Astoria in London, the venue at which the band would perform the biggest headlining gig of their career in 2001.

== Reception ==
The NME gave the song a mixed review, saying "after a couple of minutes of these standard-issue, pirouetting grunge chords, Browne's self-dramatising vocals, only the most soft-hearted wouldn't feel the urge to shove a pork pie in his mouth". The Tip Sheet named it their record of the week, commenting "we're not sure how offensive it is, but it's certainly more interesting than average and anyway, we can't really bring ourselves to worry about it because we like the tune so much". Melody Maker were positive ("a-Pop-lectic fuzz-fest, a delicious velvet-wrapped parcel of punkish ambiguity") but elected to give the single only 2/5.

Professional ratings
Review scores
Source	Rating
Melody Maker	2/5 stars

== Track listing ==
=== CD ===
1. "Big Isn't Beautiful"
2. "Scream And Shout"
3. "Comfortable"

=== 7" ===
1. "Big Isn't Beautiful"
2. "Scream And Shout"

== Personnel ==
- Matt Browne – vocals, rhythm guitar
- Martyn Nelson – lead guitar
- Robbie Grimmit – bass
- Dan Dabrowski – drums

== Production ==
- Big Isn't Beautiful – Produced and mixed by Chris Sheldon
- Scream And Shout, Comfortable – Produced by King Adora, engineered by John Rivers
