= The Defiled =

British metal band (2005–2016)

- Origin: London, England
- Genres: Metalcore, industrial metal, groove metal
- Years active: 2005–2016
- Labels: Nuclear Blast, Raise the Game, In at the Deep End
- Spinoffs: Lowlives, Red Method
- Past members: Lee Downer aka Stitch D The AvD; Vincent Hyde; Needles; Drex Exel; J.C Brutal; Aaron Curse; J.J. Gun (Tour Member)
- Website: thedefiled.net

The Defiled were a four-piece British band from London mixing groove-laden hardcore/metal with electronic music influences. They have been described by Kerrang! magazine as "The saviours of UK Metal" and championed by Metal Hammer as one of the leaders in a new wave of British metal along with bands such as While She Sleeps, Bury Tomorrow and Devil Sold His Soul. The band have built a fanbase following support slots with bands such as Murderdolls, Static-X, Godsmack, Deathstars and Motionless in White as well as playing Bloodstock, Download and Sonisphere festivals.

== History ==
=== Early years, 1888 and Grave Times (2005–2011) ===
The band formed in 2005, and quickly embarked a number of tours early in their careers including their second, entitled "The Black Death Tour" climaxing in a sold out London show at the Underworld. These gigs have earned the band a reputation for their energetic and chaotic live shows.

With a series of sought-after demos trading between fans, the band released their first EP (1888) in 2009, and released their full album Grave Times for free, in the January issue of Metal Hammer. The Deluxe edition of the album (including a bonus disc), which had more preorders than both Rob Zombie and Foo Fighters and included the 1888 ReWorks EP and 2 music videos, was released on 14 February 2011. The Defiled headlined the Jägermeister stage at Sonisphere in July 2011 and opened the main stage at Bloodstock Open Air in August of the same year. They were nominated for the Best New British Band award in the Metal Hammer 2011 Golden Gods awards.

=== Line-up changes, Nuclear Blast, Daggers and break-up (2012–2016) ===
In 2012 The Defiled opened for the Jägermeister Music tour 2012 at the Brixton Academy, supporting Black Spiders, Therapy? and Skindred, and performed at South By South West in a Metal Hammer Showcase, as well as play on the Third Stage at Download Festival 2012. 7 March 2012 saw the official welcome of Paul 'Needles' White, the band's 12th drummer, to the band replacing J.C. In June 2012 they won Best New Band at the Metal Hammer Golden Gods awards. The band opened up a PledgeMusic campaign to aid the funding of their second album, recorded in Florida with producer Jason Suecof. The campaign reached its target with over a week to go. To accompany the album, The Defiled also released a live album of Grave Times performed in full. The Defiled supported DragonForce along with Alestorm on the UK and Irish leg of their European Tour in Autumn 2012. In November 2012 they were announced for the 2013 Jägermeister UK Music Tour, supporting Gojira and Ghost. From February to March 2013, they supported Bury Tomorrow on their first European headline tour. On 12 March 2013 Daniel P. Carter premiered a new song, "Sleeper", on BBC Radio One. On 15 March they announced that they had signed to Nuclear Blast to release their second album, Daggers. In May 2013 The Defiled set about some special intimate UK shows in the south but then later expanded the dates doing a full UK tour including a slot at Crooked Ways Festival. On 21 June, on the eve of their first ever US tour with Davey Suicide and The Bunny The Bear (which included a performance on the St Petersburg leg of the Vans Warped Tour), they released their Grave Times Live album to those who had pledged towards the funding of Daggers.

In September 2013, The Defiled toured alongside Glamour of the Kill as the support to Motionless in White on their Infamous UK Tour 2013.

In February 2014, the band embarked on a UK tour with support from Butcher Babies and The Killing Lights.

In July 2014, Aaron Curse left the band. A tribute in the music video for Infected was made to him, in which he was officially "killed off".

In September 2014, the four-piece travelled to Greenland to film a live set on an iceberg, playing a 30-minute set which included songs from their latest album 'daggers'. In doing this, they became the first band ever to play on a free-floating iceberg.

In November 2014, The Defiled toured with Special Guests Avatar as the headliner for the UK leg and as support during the European legs.

They went on a European Tour in May 2016 with In This Moment and also their own headline tour called "Running in Cirles", they also had an EP/Album planned for 2016.

Their influences, as cited by Stitch D in an interview with EverythingRock, include: Nine Inch Nails, Slayer, Nirvana, Ministry, Machine Head and Freddy Krueger.

On 18 March 2016 the band announced that they split up via their Facebook page:

"It is with heavy, blackened hearts, that we inform you that the time has come to lay The Defiled to rest. There is no drama or fallouts, but we have been forced to face the reality that the love of what we do is not enough to keep our black ship sailing; the continuation of The Defiled has become logistically (financially) untenable. Thank you – you, our fans, have given us a life experience that we could have never dreamed of. From a grotty flat in north London, you have enabled us to reach places we'd previously only read or heard about, allowed us to grace stages all over the world, cheered for us at some of the worlds [sic] most prestigious festivals and granted us the opportunity to perform alongside some of our heroes. And we are in the Guinness Book Of World Records – WTF??!! Seeing you singing our words back to us, hearing your stories on how our music has affected you, watching you lose your shit to the heavy bits and seeing the spontaneous outpouring of love when some of you linked arms and made a "circle of love" at our last London show has moved us in ways that are impossible to articulate, but just know; we love you for it. This means we are forced to cancel our scheduled shows with In This Moment in May as well as the headline shows planned. We hate to let you down a second time in just a few months, but unfortunately this is unavoidable. We know this is not good enough, and all of us deserve a proper send off for The Defiled. We are currently working out how to record some final songs for you, and if we can do a farewell tour before our Final Sleep. Until then... The Defiled 1888 – 2016"

Stitch D now lives in America and fronts the band Lowlives under the stage name Lee Villain. Alex Avdis now plays in Red Method along with members of Gibraltarian group Meta-Stasis.

== Band members ==
Last known line-up

- Stitch D – lead vocals, guitar (2005–2016)
- The AvD – programming, synthesizer, keyboards, backing vocals (2005–2016), drums (2005–2008)
- Vincent Hyde – bass (2010–2016)
- Paul "Needles" White – drums (2012–2016)

Former members

- Aaron Curse – guitar (2005–2014)
- Drex Exel – bass (2005–2010)
- J.C – drums, percussion (2008–2012)

== Discography ==
Studio albums

- Grave Times (2011)
- Daggers (2013)

Extended plays

- 1888 (2009)

Live albums

- Grave Times Live (2013)

Other appearances

- Various artists – Kerrang! Presents: Metallica – The Black Album: Covered (track: "The Unforgiven") (2012)
- Various artists – Kerrang! does Green Day's American Idiot (track: "Wake Me Up When September Ends") (2014)
- Various artists – Worship and Tributes (track: "It Never Ends" by Bring Me the Horizon) (2015) "Another Life" (Motionless In White) (2019,Album: Disguise)

Music videos

- The Resurrectionists (2010)
- Call to Arms (2011)
- Black Death (2011)
- Blood Sells (2012)
- Unspoken (2013)
- As I Drown (2013)
- No Place Like Home (2014)
- Infected (2014)
- Five Minutes (2014)
