= For He's a Jolly Good Felon =

Single by Lostprophets

from the album The Betrayed
- Released: 11 April 2010
- Recorded: January 2009
- Studio: Sunset Sound, Los Angeles
- Genre: Alternative rock; pop-punk; reggae punk
- Length: 4:43 (album version); 3:11 (radio edit); 5:33 (ReFix version)
- Label: Visible Noise (UK); Sony UK (US)
- Songwriters: Lee Gaze; Mike Lewis; Jamie Oliver; Stu Richardson; Ian Watkins
- Producer: Stuart Richardson

Lostprophets singles chronology
"Where We Belong" (2010)	"For He's a Jolly Good Felon" (2010)	"Bring 'Em Down" (2012)

"For He's a Jolly Good Felon" is the third single from the album The Betrayed, the fourth studio album by the Welsh rock band Lostprophets. According to the band's mailing list, the single was set to be released on 11 April 2010. The single's formats included 7" vinyl (released on 12 April), a digital download, an iTunes single (including a live version of "Dirty Little Heart"), and a remix version by L'Amour La Morgue (Ian Watkins' side project). The cover for the single was posted to Dragonninja.com on 1 March 2010.

Ian Watkins admitted that the song, the music video and most of The Betrayed album were based on their upbringing. He told The Sun: "The song is about us growing up on council estates in Wales. The lyrics are about that way of life, I am not condoning it. We were good boys, it was just that our environment exposed us to anti-social behaviour. In this new album I have been very honest lyrically without a filter or producer. I have already covered areas like the conditioning of society and my anger towards it, so I suppose I just didn't want to repeat myself".

== Track listing ==
All tracks are written by Lostprophets.

iTunes UK single
No.	Title	Length
1.	"For He's a Jolly Good Felon" (radio edit)	3:11
2.	"Dirty Little Heart" (acoustic live at Union Chapel)	4:04

L'Amour la Morgue Rinse and ReFix edition
No.	Title	Length
1.	"For He's a Jolly Good Felon" (L'Amour la Morgue Rinse and ReFix edition)	5:33

Standard digital download single
No.	Title	Length
1.	"For He's a Jolly Good Felon" (radio edit)	3:11

7" vinyl (limited to 1000 copies)
No.	Title	Length
1.	"For He's a Jolly Good Felon" (radio edit)	3:11

== Music video ==
The music video was released on 12 March 2010 to YouTube by Visible Noise and follows the storyline of the song. Just like the previous video, "Where We Belong", it is filmed in greyscale.

Lostprophets also released a video showing the making of 'For He's a Jolly Good Felon'. This was available on YouTube on 24 March 2010. The band have also released a full-length cinematic version of the original music video. This included dialogue of the video and was released on 6 April. The video was shot in Moss Side, Manchester. It also featured Alan Ford, known as the character Brick Top from the film Snatch.

== Personnel ==
- Ian Watkins – lead vocals
- Lee Gaze – lead guitar
- Mike Lewis – rhythm guitar
- Stu Richardson – bass guitar
- Jamie Oliver – piano, synth, keyboard, samples, vocals
- Ilan Rubin – drums, percussion (recording)
- Luke Johnson – drums, percussion (music video)

== Chart performance ==
"For He's A Jolly Good Felon" debuted on the UK Rock Chart on 4 April 2010, at number 19. then on 11 April 2010, the single climbed 10 places to number nine. On 18 April 2010, the single climbed a further 5 places to number four. The single also entered the UK Indie Chart at number 30. During the next week it climbed 21 places, charting at number nine on the same chart. The single however performed poorly in the UK Singles Chart entering at number 99 – one of the bands' lowest-charting singles to date. This was in spite of a campaign by the band to get the single to number one. The low entry could be because no physical single was released, and the planned vinyl release never happened due to production problems.

Chart (2009)	Peak position
UK Indie (OCC)	9
UK Rock & Metal (OCC)	4
UK Singles (OCC)	99
