= Bionic/The Law =

2000 single by King Adora

Single by King Adora
- Released: 8 May 2000
- Genre: Punk rock, hard rock, glam rock
- Label: Superior Quality Recordings
- Songwriters: Matt Browne, Martyn Nelson
- Producer: Chris Sheldon

King Adora singles chronology
"Bionic/The Law" (2000)	"Big Isn't Beautiful" (2000)

"Bionic/The Law" is the debut single by British glam rock band King Adora. The double a-side single was given a limited release on 8 May 2000 on Superior Quality Recordings and reached number 128 on the UK Singles Chart. Both songs would be re-recorded for the band's 2001 debut album, Vibrate You.

== Background ==
=== Writing and recording ===
Both songs were recorded at Great Linford Manor in Great Linford, Buckinghamshire in early 2000 and were produced and mixed by Chris Sheldon. The Law included drum machine samples, which were credited on the single's sleeve to "Roland".

=== Themes ===
The band explained that Bionic is "about the passionate and cathartic relationship between the band and our audience. The intense connection live. Where everything that hurts and pains everyday doesn't matter any more. Escaping!". The Law is "a tale of seduction and corruption. About getting your leg over with a copper and being caught with your pants down".

== Reception ==
Melody Maker were overwhelmingly positive, giving the single 4.5/5 and commenting "totally unstoppable and deliriously frenzied".

Professional ratings
Review scores
Source	Rating
Melody Maker	4.5/5 stars

== Track listing ==
=== CD ===
1. "Bionic"
2. "The Law"

=== 7" ===
1. "Bionic"
2. "The Law"

== Personnel ==
- Matt Browne – vocals, rhythm guitar
- Martyn Nelson – lead guitar
- Robbie Grimmit – bass
- Dan Dabrowski – drums

== Production ==
- Produced and mixed by Chris Sheldon
