= King Adora =

English glam rock band

- King Adora performing in 2001

Background information
- Origin: Birmingham, England
- Genre: Glam rock
- Years active: 1998–2005, 2010, 2023
- Labels: Caroline, Superior Quality Recordings, MH Records, Discovery Recordings
- Members: Matt Browne; Martyn Nelson; Robert Grimmitt; Dan Dabrowski
- Website: Official website

King Adora was a rock group formed in Birmingham, England in 1998. The band released debut album Vibrate You in May 2001 (charting at No. 30 on the UK Albums Chart) and follow-up Who Do You Love? in March 2004. The band was notable for their short, riotous live shows. Lack of label support and changing tastes in the UK guitar music scene led King Adora to split in 2005. In 2010, the band reformed to play shows in Birmingham and London, but have been inactive since.

== History ==
=== Formation and early singles (1998–2000) ===
In 1998, Matt Browne and Martyn Nelson formed King Adora in Birmingham, England, after leaving their respective bands the Blaggards and the Joylanders. Both bands regularly played at the Flapper & Firkin in the city centre and the Jug Of Ale in Moseley was another popular hotspot. The first song the pair wrote was "Friday Night Explodes", which explored their experiences of working all week and getting drunk at Snobs nightclub in the city every Friday night. They later added Walsall-based bassist Robert Grimmit, who was the only person to attend the bass auditions. While out celebrating Grimmit's arrival, the band completed the lineup by adding drummer Dan Dabrowski, who cancelled plans to move to Nottingham in order to join. King Adora's name was reputedly taken from an oversized adult toy the band had seen in a sex shop. Drawing strong glam influences from the likes of Guns N' Roses, Mötley Crüe, Alice Cooper, T-Rex, David Bowie and Blondie, King Adora drew comparisons to Suede, Pixies and early Manic Street Preachers. The band stressed that their colourful, glam image was not the be all and end all, saying "you can't just have an image, you've got to have good songs as well, look at bands like Rachel Stamp, who are all image and don't have any songs".

The band met manager Mark Chester (who thought King Adora "were like The Clash, they were the perfect band") and gave him a three-track demo, which he circulated amongst A&R representatives. After signing a six-album deal with Superior Quality Recordings (a subsidiary of Mercury Records), the band released the singles "Bionic/The Law" (charting at no. 99), "Big Isn't Beautiful" (no. 81, released with their first music video) and "Smoulder" (no. 62) throughout 2000. BBC Radio 1 DJ Steve Lamacq was an early supporter, who broadcast several of the band's gigs on his Lamacq Live show and invited the band to record live sessions at Maida Vale Studios in 2000 and 2001. After playing London gigs supporting label mates The Bluetones, King Adora broke onto the festival circuit, appearing at T in the Park and Reading and Leeds Festivals in the summer of 2000 and joining My Vitriol to support Mansun on a UK tour in October and November. The band quickly became known for their short, explosive live shows, to the point of receiving complaints after a headlining gig in Portsmouth lasted for 19 minutes and later joking that they would have to "give it all up" if they ever played for 25 minutes. The band's growing fanbase crossed over with those of other "eyeliner-friendly" bands Manic Street Preachers, Rachel Stamp, Placebo and Mansun. King Adora were heavily publicised by Kerrang! and Melody Maker magazines, though they lost support from the latter publication when it was merged with NME (who took a lukewarm view of the band) in late 2000.

=== Vibrate You (2001) ===
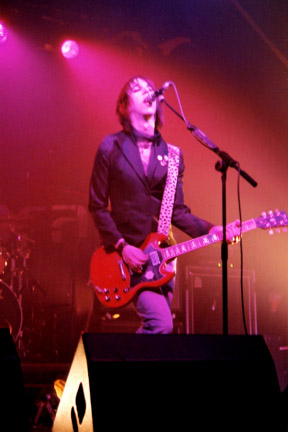
Matt Browne performing at the Electric Ballroom in London on 13 December 2001.

After a failed recording session due to alcohol abuse, King Adora were sent to record their debut album at Sawmills Studios in Cornwall with producer John Cornfield in late 2000, away from record company interference. Pictures of the studio's previous clients (Muse, The Stone Roses, The Verve) on the studio walls provided inspiration during the sessions. The band staged a Christmas party, which was featured in one of the final issues of Melody Maker. King Adora began 2001 with a UK tour in January and February, with support from Easyworld and Mo-Ho-Bish-O-Pi. The tour also included an appearance at the NME Brat Awards, supporting Mansun. The tour culminated with the release of the "Suffocate" single on 19 February, which reached number 39 on the UK Singles Chart. Another UK tour followed in April and May, with the re-released Bionic single being released mid-tour and peaking at number 30. The placing rankled with Browne, as it prevented a chance of performing on Top of the Pops, though the single was the highest-placed of the band's career. The tour also included King Adora's biggest ever headlining show, when the 19 May London date was moved from the Mean Fiddler to the Astoria, due to demand for tickets.

King Adora's debut album Vibrate You was released on 21 May 2001 and charted at number 30 on the UK Albums Chart. Looking back on the album in 2004, Browne said he "would have used different recording techniques, possibly included a couple of different songs and the artwork I absolutely loathed". On 31 May, King Adora were confirmed as support for Queens of the Stone Age on their UK tour in June. In July, the band announced they were to give away their first EP, Friday Night Explodes, for free via their official website on 3 August. King Adora played their first shows in Japan in mid-August (an experience Browne referred to as "like something out of Blade Runner"), appearing at Summer Sonic Festival and headlining a show at Liquid Rooms in Tokyo, before returning to the UK to play Reading and Leeds Festivals. In mid-October, the band finished recording a 17-track demo of new songs for Superior Quality Recordings in preparation for their second album, though they later admitted they had had little time to prepare the material. On 31 October, King Adora headlined a Lamacq Live gig for BBC Radio 1 at the Sanctuary in Birmingham, in place of Weezer and debuted new songs "Tokyo Honey", "Born to Lose", "The Chase" and "Love So Volatile". A short UK tour took place in December (featuring support from Kinesis, Kid Galahad and the Candys) with the band debuting more new songs, including Asleep and Come. Rumours circulated amongst the fanbase that King Adora had been dropped by Superior Quality Recordings, but after the tour, the band issued a statement that the rumour was false and that they would be touring to support a new single in February 2002.

=== Record label struggles (2002–2003) ===
King Adora continued writing their second album in early 2002, though the proposed single release and tour planned for February failed to happen. The band reported on 11 March that they would begin recording their second album within the next couple of weeks. It was reported in late March that a new single would be released the following month, but the release and tour failed to materialise. The band played their first gig of the year on 11 April at the Jug Of Ale in Birmingham, with new Mercury Records joint-managing director Steve Lillywhite in attendance. Lillywhite spoke to the band after the gig and concluded that the new material wasn't what the label was looking for, though the news went unreported. Further dates followed, supporting Shed Seven at Horsham Park on 14 June (debuting new song "Death by Rock 'n' Roll") and headlining Lancaster University on 25 June. It was confirmed publicly in June that King Adora had been dropped by Superior Quality Recordings and that Hall Or Nothing would no longer handle their PR. The band later expressed their relief about finally being dropped after a long period in limbo, but they felt they had been branded with a "damaged goods" tag, which kept interest from new labels low. Browne commented the following year that "new people wanted to come in and sign their own bands, as it doesn't look good if bands on the roster are doing well without them having signed them. They dropped us and everybody else". Tour manager George DeRosa later commented that the sales for a band of King Adora's size were good, but it was during a transitional period for the British music industry.

After working on further demos for their second album and leaking them on their official website, King Adora toured the UK in October and November 2002, debuting new songs "Kamikaze" and "Maniac Love". Despite low attendances at some gigs, Browne commented that "we'd been away for a year with no singles and no press so you've got to expect a degree of that any way. There could have been four people there!". Drowned in Sound announced in November that King Adora had signed to Mushroom Records, but the report was quickly discounted as being false. In March 2003, the band signed a two-single deal with MH Records and released their first new material in over eighteen months with the limited edition double A-side single "Born to Lose/Kamikaze", which charted at number 68. They also embarked on a UK tour in May, debuting new songs "Drag", "Depression", "Boy for Rent" and "9" of Pure Malice". "Born to Lose" was later included on the Love Music Hate Racism compilation album Fear of a Black Kennet, released on 8 December through R*E*P*E*A*T Records.

=== Who Do You Love? and breakup (2003–2005) ===
King Adora recorded their second album throughout 2003 at Hijack Studios in Redditch with Dodgy singer Nigel Clark. The band set a tentative release date for the album of late October 2003, to be preceded by single releases in June and August, but all the dates were later pushed back. Despite the record label problems, Grimmit said "the album we're going to release eventually is much better than what we would have done if things hadn't have happened". Putting the album out to the highest bidder, the band signed a contract with Discovery Recordings and cancelled their deal with MH Records. The first official single from the album, "Drag/9" of Pure Malice", was finally released on 24 November 2003, reaching 85 in the charts. The single was backed by an 11-date UK tour, featuring support from The Glitterati and corporation:blend. Browne stated during the tour that "we're just more resilient than we thought we were and we've come back out and this tour especially has been really really good".

King Adora's second album, Who Do You Love?, was released on 24 March 2004 and failed to chart. Despite the shift in the British guitar scene to nu metal and post-punk revival since the release of Vibrate You in 2001, Browne stated that the band could have released their second album "two years ago in the middle of the whole Strokes thing, it would have been a tough time up against 300 American bands, but that's died down slightly. It's a much better time now". Browne described the album as being "not just where we were with Vibrate You, but where we are now. It's basically a natural progression". Looking back years later, Nelson branded the album "depressing", while Grimmit said "the end quality wasn't as good as it could have been, but I think the songs are certainly there". The band undertook a month-long UK tour in May 2004, played one-off dates in July (including their first and only mainland Europe gig, in Russia) and rounded out the year with a pair of gigs in December, where they debuted new songs "Revenge" and "Backstage". A further new song, "Diamond in the Rough", was debuted live at Junktion 7 in Nottingham on 22 January 2005. King Adora's final live performance took place at Birmingham Academy on 29 May 2005 (on a multi-band bill featuring New Model Army, Eighties Matchbox B-Line Disaster, Turbonegro and Future Ex-Wife) and new song "Can't Stay Away" was debuted. Rumours spread of a third album, a live DVD release (a Birmingham Academy 2 performance from 2004 had been filmed professionally) and the band discussed changing their name and reforming. The rumours were put to rest when King Adora announced their breakup in September 2005. Nelson revealed "when we split up, everyone had had enough of each other. We were at our wits' end".

=== Post-breakup (2005–present) ===
After the band's demise, Dabrowski was "sad", "gutted" and didn't play drums "for quite a long time after". He went on to become the technical manager at Birmingham Academy and then a sound engineer for touring bands. Grimmit joined Birmingham band Deluka and later moved to New York. Browne and Nelson went on to form a new group in early 2006, initially known as Bombshell ACs and later as The High Society. The group briefly toured in October 2007 and its only release was a self-titled EP, released in 2009 on iTunes, with a limited pressing of 100 copies sold at live shows. The EP contained reworked King Adora songs "Revenge" and "Can't Stay Away". The band ceased activities in early 2010 and Browne moved to Galway, Ireland in 2011 to run the Rowdy club night with his brother. Nelson resurfaced in 2014, reinventing himself as a swing guitarist to play with Lola Lamour And Her Blue Light Boys.

In January 2010, King Adora announced that they were to reform for performances at the Hare & Hounds in Birmingham and the Garage in London in April 2010. In the same month, filmmaker Ben Lewis began production of an official King Adora documentary. Lewis had known Martyn Nelson from their time at Dartmouth High School and had followed the band when they first toured Scotland, where Lewis was living at the time. Browne commented that the band had been asked "about ten times" previously to reform, but in 2010, the time finally felt right. In advance of the reunion gigs, the band took fan requests for the setlists on their Myspace page and consequently the band's performances were the longest of their career, totalling 19 songs, including Vibrate You in its entirety and a number of Vibrate You-era b-sides. Talk of a permanent reformation was quashed by Browne. In October 2012, Dabrowski posted previously unreleased studio recordings of "Tokyo Honey" and a cover version of Nancy Sinatra's "These Boots Are Made for Walkin'" on SoundCloud. The documentary film (titled Who Do You Love? – The King Adora Story) finally saw release on 27 October 2012 and contained interviews with all four band members, manager Mark Chester, tour manager George DeRosa, Steve Lamacq and John Cornfield. The film also opened the Worcestershire Film Festival on 2 October 2012.

On 21 January 2023, King Adora reformed to play a benefit gig at the Castle and Falcon in Balsall Heath, Birmingham. Due to the unavailability of Grimmitt and Dabrowski, they were depped by former High Society members Ade Preston and Ash Sheehan respectively.

== Band members ==
- Matt Browne – lead vocals, rhythm guitar
- Martyn Nelson – lead guitar, backing vocals
- Robert Grimmit – bass
- Dan Dabrowski – drums

== Discography ==
=== Studio albums ===
- 2001: Vibrate You (21 May 2001) – UK No. 30
- 2004: Who Do You Love? (29 March 2004) – Did not chart

=== EPs ===
- 2001: Friday Night Explodes (20 August 2001)

=== Singles ===
Year	Title	Chart Positions	Album	Ref
Year	Title	UK	Album	Ref
2000	"Bionic" / "The Law"	99	Vibrate You	
2000	"Big Isn't Beautiful"	81	Vibrate You	
2000	"Smoulder"	62	Vibrate You	
2001	"Suffocate"	39	Vibrate You	
2001	"Bionic"	30	Vibrate You	
2003	"Born to Lose" / "Kamikaze"	68	Who Do You Love?	
2003	"Drag" / "9" of Pure Malice"	85	Who Do You Love?	

=== Videos ===
Year	Video	Director	Link
2000	"Big Isn't Beautiful"	Moritz	YouTube
2000	"Smoulder"	Dan Crouch	Vimeo
2001	"Suffocate"	Dan Crouch	Vimeo
2001	"Bionic"	Ben Hume-Paton	YouTube
2001	"Friday Night Explodes"	Dan Crouch	Vimeo
