= Beat Union =

English pop-punk band (2003–2009)

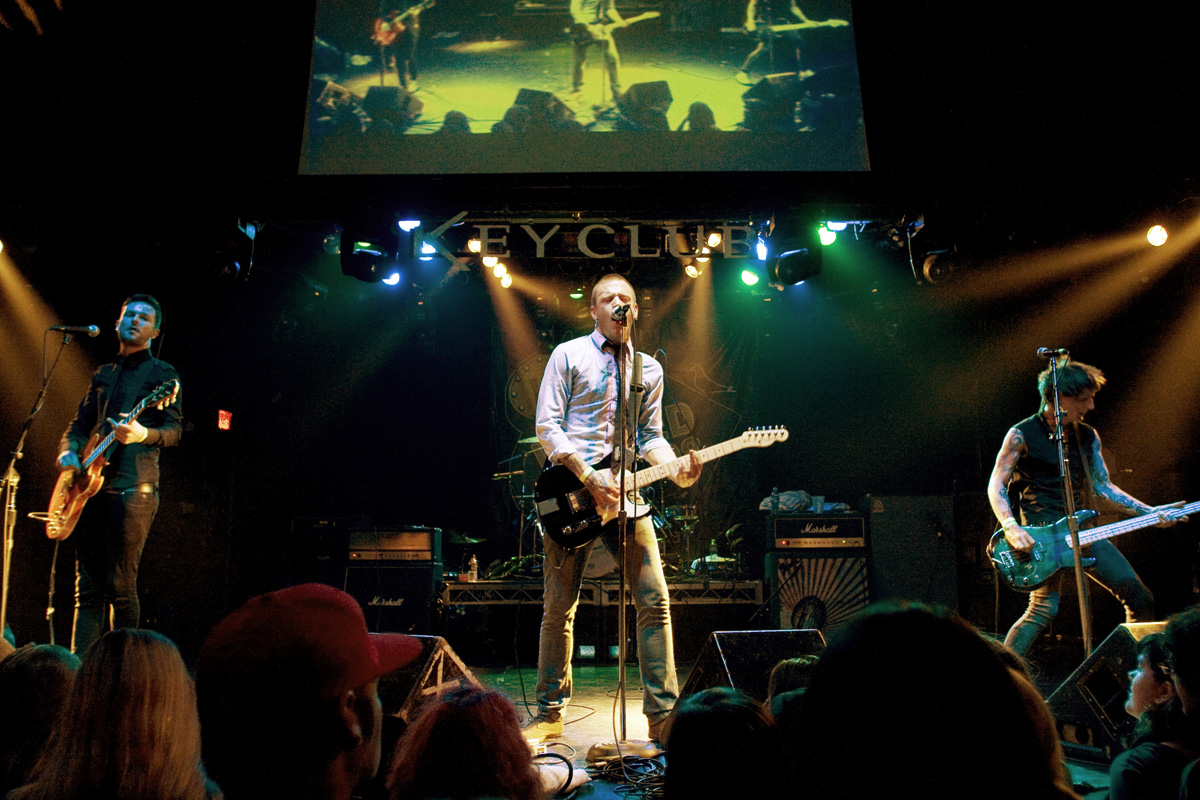
- Beat Union performing in 2008

Background information
- Also known as: Shortcut to Newark
- Origin: Birmingham, Bromsgrove and Redditch, United Kingdom
- Genres: Pop punk
- Years active: 2003–2009
- Labels: Haddock Recordings; Science
- Past members: Dave Warsop; Dean Ashton; Ade Preston; Luke Johnson; Mark Andrews
- Website: Official site

Beat Union was a pop-punk band from Birmingham, Bromsgrove and Redditch, United Kingdom. They were formerly known as Shortcut to Newark. The group has garnered comparisons to Elvis Costello and The Jam, as well as pop punk groups like Green Day.

In 2006 the band toured the UK with Bedouin Soundclash and Zox.

Their lone album, Disconnected, was released on Science Records in April 2008. It was produced with the help of John Feldmann, producer and frontman of Goldfinger. Rolling Stone named their song "She Is the Gun" Song of the Day on 17 July 2008. The song also received rotation on BBC Radio 1, where it rose to #5 on the station's airplay charts.

After releasing the album, the group toured with Goldfinger and then played the 2008 Warped Tour in the U.S. A U.S. fall tour has been announced with Flogging Molly, followed by UK dates with Less Than Jake.

Beat Union split up in January 2009.

In August 2009, Luke Johnson was officially announced as Lostprophets new drummer, as a permanent member providing "it all works out".

Johnson is now the drummer for rock band Lowlives after previously playing with No Devotion.

Warsop now fronts the bands Sharp/Shock and NOT. He previously played in Suedehead who played at Coachella Festival and toured with Social Distortion. He also records and produces bands out of Strong Studios in SOCAL.

Preston went on to reform Farse. He also played in The King Blues, Mad Caddies and King Adora.

Ashton played in Farse with Preston. He joined The King Blues and recorded 3 albums with them and then spent 5 years playing bass with NWOBHM band Diamond Head.

== Lineup ==
- Dave Warsop – Lead Vocals, Guitar (Shooter McGavin/Shortcut To Newark/Suedehead/Sharp Shock)
- Luke Johnson (aka Jocko Johnson) – Drums (Shooter McGavin/Shortcut To Newark/Amen/Lostprophets)
- Dean Ashton – Guitar, Backup Vocals (Shooter McGavin/Shortcut To Newark/Farse/The King Blues/Diamond Head)
- Ade Preston – Bass, Backup Vocals (Farse/The High Society/The King Blues)

== Discography ==
As Shooter McGavin

- "Saving The Day" 7-inch – Boss Tuneage (2001)
- "Split with Dugong" 7-inch – Rock 'Em Dead Records (2001)

As Shortcut to Newark

- "Heads in Hands Heads in Half" 7-inch EP – Boss Tuneage (2003)
- Gearing Up for Getting Down CD – (Suckapunch Records (2006)

As Beat Union

- "She Is The Gun" 7-inch/CD – Haddock Recordings (2007)
- Disconnected CD – Science Records (2008)
