= Can't Catch Tomorrow (Good Shoes Won't Save You This Time) =

Single by Lostprophets

from the album Liberation Transmission
- Released: 27 November 2006 (United Kingdom)
- Recorded: 2006
- Genre: Alternative rock; emo
- Length: 3:36
- Label: Columbia; Visible Noise
- Songwriters: Lee Gaze; Mike Lewis; Jamie Oliver; Stu Richardson; Ian Watkins
- Producer: Bob Rock

Lostprophets singles chronology
"The New Transmission" (2006)	"Can't Catch Tomorrow (Good Shoes Won't Save You This Time)" (2006)	"4:AM Forever" (2007)

"Can't Catch Tomorrow (Good Shoes Won't Save You This Time)" is the third single from the album Liberation Transmission (2006), the third studio album by the Welsh rock band Lostprophets. It entered the UK singles chart at 35, the lowest position yet for a single from Liberation Transmission.

The band worked with Ryan Smith on the music video for this song. The video was filmed in Los Angeles and is inspired by the British drama film Quadrophenia (1979).

The shoes on the cover art are derived from a competition where fans were asked to take Polaroid instant photos of their shoes. The winning submissions made the cover.

== Track listing ==
CD1
No.	Title	Length
1.	"Can't Catch Tomorrow (Good Shoes Won't Save You This Time)"	3:36
2.	"Fight" ("Everybody's Screaming!!!" demo)	4:02

CD2
No.	Title	Length
1.	"Can't Catch Tomorrow (Good Shoes Won't Save You This Time)"	3:36
2.	"Can't Catch Tomorrow" (live from Cardiff)	3:40
3.	"Wait" (Always All Ways (Apologies, Glances and Messed Up Chances)" demo)	3:53

EP version
No.	Title	Length
1.	"Can't Catch Tomorrow" (radio edit)	3:06
2.	"Love" (demo)	3:11
3.	"Distances" (demo)	3:57
4.	"What You Do" (demo)	3:24
5.	"Still Falling" (demo)	4:26

Vinyl
No.	Title	Length
1.	"Can't Catch Tomorrow (Good Shoes Won't Save You This Time)"	3:36
2.	"Can't Catch Tomorrow" (acoustic)	4:06

== Personnel ==
- Ian Watkins – lead vocals
- Lee Gaze – lead guitar
- Mike Lewis – rhythm guitar
- Stu Richardson – bass guitar
- Jamie Oliver – piano, keyboard, samples, vocals
- Josh Freese – drums, percussion (recording)
- Ilan Rubin – drums, percussion (music video)

== Chart positions ==
Chart (2006)	Peak position
UK Singles Chart	35
