= Luke Johnson (drummer) =

British drummer (born 1981)

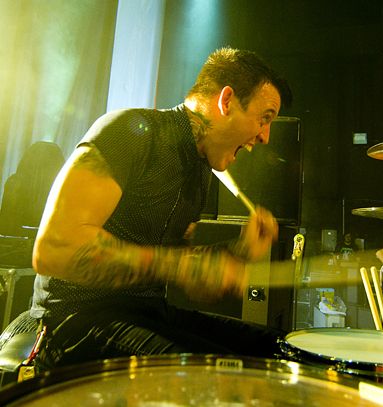
- Johnson performing in 2009

Background information
- Born: Luke Anthony Johnson; 11 March 1981 (age 45); Redditch, Worcestershire, England
- Genres: Alternative rock; hard rock; post-hardcore; emo
- Occupation: Musician
- Instrument: Drums
- Years active: 1990s–present
- Member of: Lowlives
- Formerly of: Amen; Beat Union; Lostprophets; No Devotion
- Website: Luke Johnson on Twitter

Luke Anthony Johnson (born 11 March 1981) is an English rock drummer.

Johnson began his music career in the late 1990s drumming for a spree of small local West Midlands punk and metal bands. In early 2003, he was approached by California punk band Amen to join the ranks. After his departure in 2005, Johnson formed Beat Union as drummer and songwriter with Dave Warsop, Dean Ashton and Mark Andrews. He joined the Welsh alternative rock band Lostprophets in 2009 until their disbanding in 2013. Johnson has also been involved in other musical projects, including working alongside Producer John Feldmann (Good Charlotte, The Used, Kelly Clarkson) and has performed session work for a variety of bands, including The Wonder Stuff and Foxy Shazam. In 2016, Johnson started the band Lowlives along with Lee Downer (the former frontman of the Defiled). Lowlives released their first EP, Burn Forever, in 2018 and their first full-length album, Freaking Out, in 2024.

== Biography ==
=== Early life ===
Johnson was exposed to music at the very early age of 2. Beginning with his father, Les Johnson, who was a Birmingham promoter for such bands as New Order, Killing Joke and New Model Army. At the age of 5, Johnson started to join his father on tour with the band he managed, the Wonder Stuff. Johnson was then given his first pair of drumsticks by Martin Gilks and would often even get to soundcheck the drums. "All my life I've been around music. I'd go to shows and soundcheck the drums for the Wonder Stuff and get to play kits on these big stages during soundcheck and hearing the sound of a drumkit through a PA I thought, 'Man I really want to do this!'", says Johnson.

=== Beat Union ===
Beat Union was a pop-punk band from Birmingham, Bromsgrove and Redditch. They were formerly known as Shortcut to Newark. The group has garnered comparisons to Elvis Costello and the Jam, as well as pop punk groups like Green Day. In 2006 the band toured the UK with Bedouin Soundclash and Zox. Their debut full-length album, Disconnected, was released on Science Records in April 2008. It was produced with the help of John Feldmann, producer and frontman of Goldfinger. Rolling Stone named their song "She Is the Gun" Song of the Day on 17 July 2008. The song also received rotation on BBC Radio 1, where it rose to No. 5 on the station's airplay charts. After releasing the album, the group toured with Goldfinger and then played the 2008 Warped Tour in the US A US fall tour was announced with Flogging Molly, followed by UK dates with Less Than Jake.

=== Lostprophets (2009–2013) ===
Following the departure of American drummer Ilan Rubin from Lostprophets, Johnson was officially announced as the band's new drummer in August 2009, after they had completed the recording of their fourth studio album The Betrayed. The album was released in January 2010, and Johnson toured with them in support of the album, commencing in February 2010 with their UK tour in which they were supported by Kids in Glass Houses, Hexes, We Are the Ocean and Sharks. Johnson would go on to play on the band's fifth and final album, Weapons, which was released in 2012. The band split in October 2013 after vocalist Ian Watkins was imprisoned after multiple child sex offences.

=== No Devotion (2014–2015) ===
Johnson wrote music for various artists while also working on his own solo EP. He was also the drummer and founding member of the rock band formed by former Lostprophets members, No Devotion.

He left No Devotion in late 2014, feeling he was unable to meet the commitments the band required, although it was not announced by the band until January 2015, as the other members hoped he would change his mind. He was replaced by former Kids in Glass Houses drummer Phillip Jenkins as their touring drummer.

=== Solo career (2015) ===
In April 2015, Johnson released three singles on the music streaming service SoundCloud, titled 'Say Something', 'The Beat of my Heart', and 'Ignorance'.

=== Lowlives (2016–present) ===
Luke started the band Lowlives in 2016 along with Lee Downer (formerly known as Stitch D of the Defiled), their first show was supporting Moose Blood in Los Angeles in October 2017. Lowlives released their first EP Burn Forever in August 2018 they also supported the Used in the same month in England.

Lowlives released their first full-length album, Freaking Out, on 31 May 2024.
