= The King Blues discography =

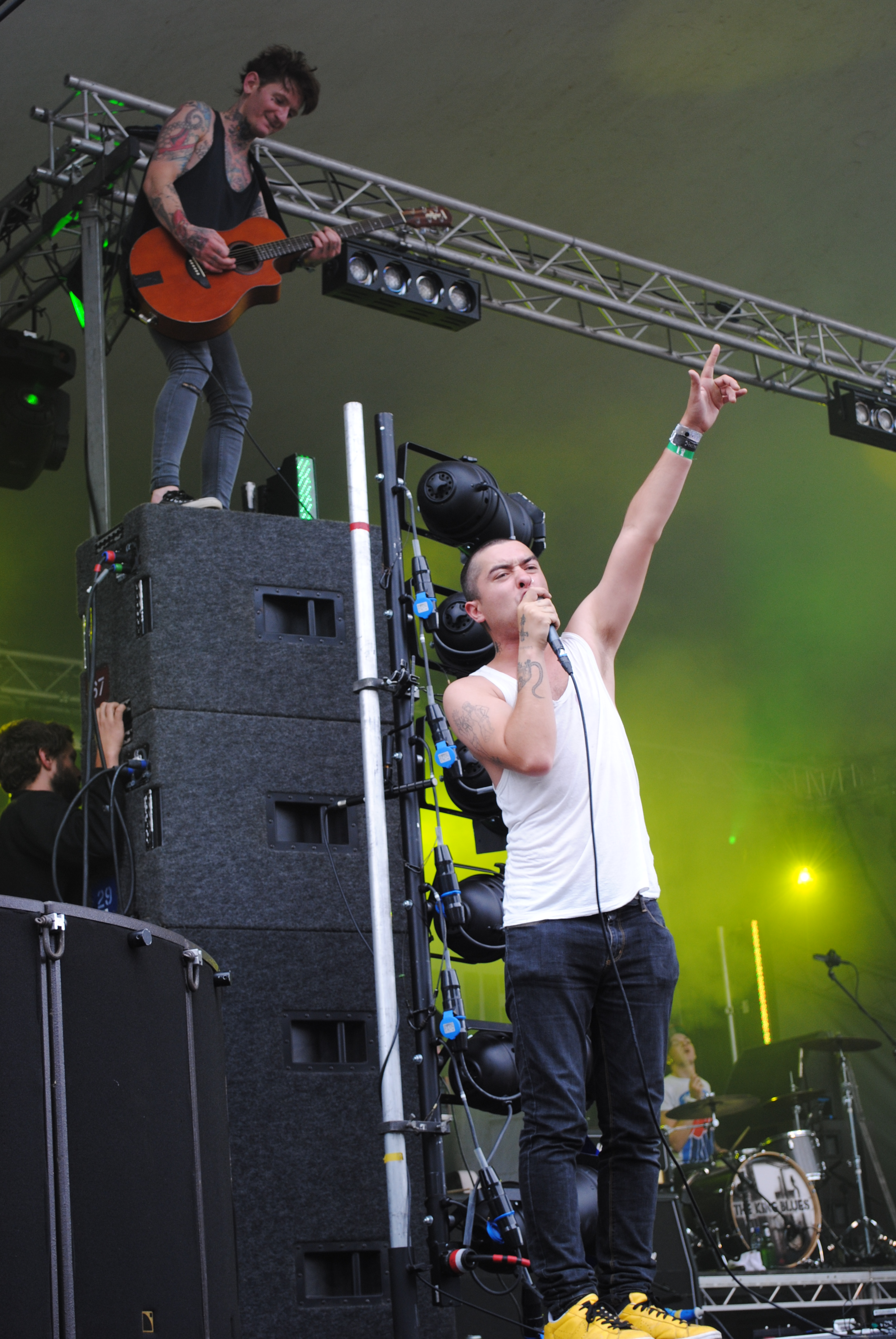
- King Blues at Kendal Calling 2010
- Studio albums: 6
- Extended plays: 5
- Singles: 9
- Music videos: 8

This is the discography of the British punk rock band The King Blues.

== Studio albums ==
Year	Album	Peak chart positions
Year	Album	UK
2006	Under the Fog: Released: June, 2006; Label: Household Name Records; Producer: Peter Miles	-
2008	Under the Fog (re-release): Released: 18 February 2008; Label: Field Records; Producer: Peter Miles	-
2008	Save the World. Get the Girl: Released: 20 October 2008; Label: Field Records; Producer: Peter Miles, Clive Langer	113
2011	Punk & Poetry: Released: 17 April 2011; Label: Transmission Recordings; Producer: Peter Miles	31
2012	Long Live the Struggle: Released: 2 July 2012; Label: Transmission Recordings; Producer: Jon Feldmann	43
2017	The Gospel Truth: Released: 14 April 2017; Label: Cooking Vinyl	47
2019	38 Minutes: Released: 1 July 2019; Label: Meatball Records	-
2026	A Monkey Could Do that: Releases: 24 July 2026; Label: Meatball Records/23rd Precinct Music masters	-

== Singles ==
Year	Single	Peak chart positions	Album
Year	Single	UK	Album
2006	"Mr. Music Man"	–	Under the Fog
2007	"Come Fi Di Youth"	–	Under the Fog
2008	"Mr. Music Man" (re-issue)	–	Under the Fog
2008	"Let's Hang the Landlord"	–	Save the World. Get the Girl
2008	"My Boulder"	156	Save the World. Get the Girl
2009	"Save the World, Get the Girl"	68	Save the World. Get the Girl
2009	"I Got Love"	96	Save the World. Get the Girl
2010	"Headbutt"	72	Punk & Poetry
2010	"Holiday"	–	–
2011	"Set the World on Fire"	–	Punk & Poetry
2011	"I Want You"	-	Punk & Poetry
2011	"The Future's Not What It Used to Be"	-	Punk & Poetry
2011	"Does Anybody Care About Us?"	-	Punk & Poetry
2012	"Modern Life Has Let Me Down"	-	Long Live the Struggle
2012	"Keep the Faith"	-	Long Live the Struggle
2017	"Heart of a Lion"	-	The Gospel Truth
2017	"The Bullingdon Boys"	-	The Gospel Truth
2017	"Nike Town"	-	The Gospel Truth
2017	"Tory is a Four Letter Word"	-	-
2023	"What if Punk Never Happened, Pt. II"	-	-
2024	"Tory is A 4 Letter Word Pt II"	-	-
2026	"Now is the Time of Monsters"	-	A Monkey Could Do That
2026	"The Stupidest Animal in the Zoo"	-	A Monkey Could Do That
2026	"We'd Turn It into a Bomb"	-	A Monkey Could Do That
2026	"Ten Gallon Alan"	-	A Monkey Could Do That
"—" denotes a release that did not chart or has not been released

== Extended plays ==
Date	EP	Format	Label	Producer	Comments
May 2006	All Fall Down EP				
May 2007	Taking Over	CD			
September 2008	The Engine Room Acoustic Session	CD			
December 2008	My Boulder EP	Download			
December 2009	I Got Love EP	Download			
February 2016	Off with Their Heads				

== Music videos ==
Year	Title	Director	Video
2006	"Mr. Music Man"	Adam Powell	https://www.youtube.com/watch?v=2OSlU8lYwH0
2008	"Let's Hang the Landlord"	Adam Powell	https://www.youtube.com/watch?v=2OSlU8lYwH0
2008	"My Boulder"	Adam Powell	
2009	"Save the World, Get the Girl"		https://www.youtube.com/watch?v=rs8ZSlJO34Q
2009	"I Got Love"	Adam Powell	https://www.youtube.com/watch?v=fYOEGymrYCk
2010	"Headbutt"	Adam Powell	https://www.youtube.com/watch?v=n3kuhqcx_Ho
2010	"Holiday"	Adam Powell	https://www.youtube.com/watch?v=xUD_ONEyyjM
2011	"Set the World on Fire"		https://www.youtube.com/watch?v=dLnKKkglQr0
