= Howards Alias =

Punk band

- Origin: Southampton, Hampshire, UK
- Genres: Rock; progressive rock; punk rock
- Years active: 1999–2005, 2006–2008
- Labels: Good Clean Fun Records; Household Name Records
- Members: Matthew Reynolds; Nicholas Horne; David Ransom; Robert King; Matthew Roberts
- Past members: Christopher Murphy; Rob Griffin; Stevie McCusker; Jevon Snell; Jon Warren; Lloyd Williams; Peter Miles
- Website: official Myspace

Howards Alias were a band in the turn-of-the-millennium UK underground punk scene. They formed in 1999 in Southampton, England, and blended an eclectic mix of rock, progressive, punk and ska influences into their own musical output. They permanently disbanded in April 2008.

The band released four full-length albums. The first – The Chameleon Script – was released by Good Clean Fun Records in 2002, with the second and third albums being released on the Household Name Records label in 2004 and 2005, respectively. In 2008, the band self-released their final album, [ep.i.phan.ic], before splitting up. During their career, Howards Alias also released a split EP with the Californian band Desa, and contributed to several international punk compilation CDs.

== History ==
=== Original run (1999–2005) ===
Howards Alias began at the end of 1999, writing songs mostly in the ska-punk vein. Matthew Reynolds had a dream in which he decided that there should be a name for not only the band, but also the band's sound – this was "Howard". Using the logic that music should not be confined to one genre, he decided that "Howard" should have many aliases. Even by the time that The Chameleon Script was released in 2002, it became apparent that the band's sound was somewhat more mature and defined than the usual third wave sound that had been overdone in previous years. The album was critically acclaimed; even by notorious UK rock weekly Kerrang!, who awarded it four "K"s out of five.

The band continued to tour hard with bands such as Lightyear, Captain Everything!, No Comply, Sonic Boom Six, Desa and Rx Bandits (who are generally acknowledged as a major influence in later Howards Alias work).

In early 2004, the band wrote three new songs for inclusion on a split EP with Desa. The EP showed a change of direction from The Chameleon Script, with the band dropping a lot of the predominant ska influences. This showed a transition that the band cemented with the release of The Answer Is Never later in the same year. The album was hailed by critics as "a masterpiece" and "one of the best British rock records ever made", with EuroPunk.net firmly stating "If you claim to love music, you owe it to yourself to own this record, simply as that". Longtime drummer Jevon Snell left the band in early 2005 (soon to join another Southampton-based band: Chin Music), and was replaced by Jon Warren of Workin Lunch. The band went into the studio with this new line-up to record the follow-up to The Answer Is Never. The result was Beat Heart, Beat, which was released in the July 2005.

Less of a drastic step and more of a natural progression from the previous album, the critical reception of the album was mostly positive. The inclusion of a keyboard (played by the multi-talented Nicholas Horne) was particularly praised for adding a new depth to the Howards Alias sound. Some older fans, however, were alienated by the step even further away from the original ska-punk roots of the band.

=== First breakup (2005–2007) ===
With extensive touring taking its toll on inter-band friendships, bassist Stevie and drummer Jon both left the band after a tour to support the release of Beat Heart, Beat. Guitarist and vocalist Matthew Reynolds left a message on the band's website and MySpace informing fans that the band would split up after a final tour. Peter Miles – producer of The Answer Is Never and Beat Heart, Beat – was recruited to play bass, and friend Lloyd Williams took drum duties.

Matthew Reynolds spoke in an interview with PunkNews.co.uk, regarding the reasons behind the split:

I think, like; circumstance, basically. We haven't had an interview yet asking us that so it's kind of a bit weird. I think basically we've been touring for a long time and have played a lot of shows. I don't want to sound like I'm whining, 'cos it's nothing like that. We've always been a bit unlucky as far as money is concerned. We're not the best people in the world at handling money. Also, there's not a lot of money to be earned playing to little crowds across the country all the time. We don't have a lot of money and that kind of put pressure on the band, I think, and the tour in July lasted about thirty-something days. It was kind of like we were in a time bomb waiting to happen. It kind of built until the point where we felt we weren't getting on because of the circumstances we were in. No-one was happy, none of us had any stability in life. We'd tour, and that's really fun; but then we'd go home. Not so much me and Nick, but Jon and Steve really felt that they didn't really have any stability at home. Neither of them had a place to live, so they were sleeping on mates' floors and things like that. They couldn't afford to buy food a lot of the time. After a while it kind of got to them both. It got to me as well – I'm not trying to, like, pass the buck, if that's what it sounds like. It was all of us equally, it was kind of like... building up. We decided at the end of the tour we'd take some time off and we got together a month or so later and talked about it. We then decided it would be the best thing for all of us just to call it a day really.

Howards Alias split up in October 2005, with a final hometown show at The Nexus club in Southampton, UK.

==== Thinkpol ====
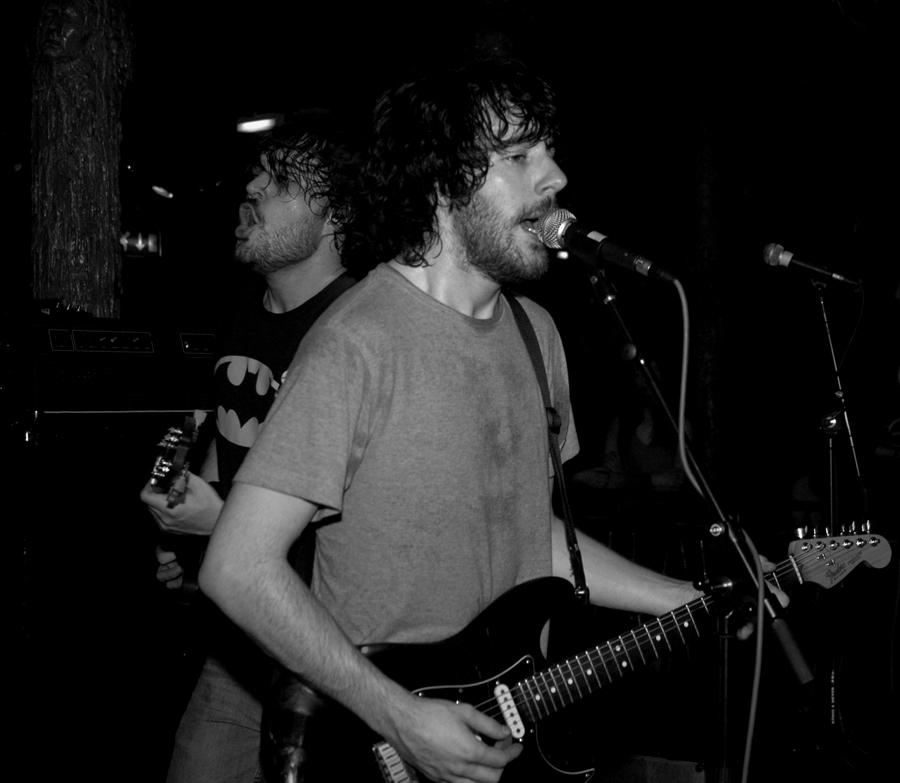
Matthew Reynolds with brother Andrew Reynolds performing in Thinkpol, Manchester Satan's Hollow, 16 March 2006

In January 2006, Matthew Reynolds revealed plans of a new musical outlet – Thinkpol. Named after the Thought police of George Orwell's novel Nineteen Eighty-Four, the band had a more straightforward and accessible rock sound than Howards Alias. The band originally consisted of Matthew Reynolds, brother Andrew Reynolds, Peter Miles and Robert King. Peter Miles left the band and was replaced by Nicholas Horne, fresh from his short stint playing bass guitar in NoComply.

Thinkpol released two demo CDs with three songs on each, although many more were written for inclusion on their planned debut album. Howards Alias had said that they were working on the unrecorded Thinkpol song "Cough It Up" for their fourth album [ep.i.phan.ic] but it never materialised.

=== Reformation (2006–2008) ===
On 25 September 2006, the following message appeared on Thinkpol's Myspace:

Hello good people of the world.

Thinkpol are no longer a band.

This was followed by news of a December tour and fourth album to follow in 2007. This incarnation of the band included Matthew Roberts (formerly of NoComply) on saxophone and Rob King (formerly of Thinkpol) on drums.

In the summer of 2007, Howards Alias made three new songs available for streaming on their MySpace over a period of three weeks. The first, entitled "Wot 'Ave You", appeared on 29 June 2007, with the remaining two tracks—"Swansong" and "Spilt Milk"—appearing on the next two consecutive Fridays (6 and 13 July respectively).

Howards Alias later confirmed via Myspace blog that they would soon be recording their fourth album, tentatively titled [ep.i.phan.ic]. Songs mentioned for inclusion on the album were "What A View" (a re-titling of "Wot 'Ave You"), "Swansong", "Spilt Milk", "Big Brains", "Long Haul", "Saw Sense", "Taking Off", "We Are The Sun", "Rooftops", "Not The Same", and "Cough It Up" (an unrecorded Thinkpol-era song). The band played three dates at the end of October to precede the recording of the album, in Derby, Southampton and Folkestone.

In a December blog, [ep.i.phan.ic] was announced as being "ready to buy in March 2008".

=== Second breakup (2008–present) ===
On 15 April 2008, Reynolds announced that Howards Alias were to permanently disband. This was the first official announcement from Howards Alias in 2008, although Reynolds had been promoting his solo album, The Wreck of the Hesperus, throughout February.

Drummer Robert King had left the band in January to continue his career and, following the initial shock, the band had decided to try to recruit a new drummer. In March, however, Matthew Roberts went on tour playing saxophone for Foals and subsequently started tour managing other bands; feeling that he could no longer commit the time to Howards Alias, he also left the band. With almost half of the core members of the band gone, Matthew Reynolds, Nicholas Horne, and David Ransom agreed that it would be "a next-to-impossible task to replace them".

Although disbanding, Howards Alias confirmed their intention to release [ep.i.phan.ic] in a limited run for any fans who expressed an interest in pre-ordering a copy via their Myspace. A total of one thousand copies were pressed.

==== Skylar ====
Skylar is the reggae/traditional ska side project of four members of the underground UK band Howards Alias. Their original drummer, Jon Warren, was also formerly a member of Howards Alias. The band was formed in March 2004 as an outlet for "Matt to use material he was writing that wasn't suitable for the other band he plays in". To this end, all Skylar songs and lyrics are written by Matthew Reynolds.

The band have released an eponymous debut album, recorded in only eleven hours by Peter Miles. It was self-released in a plastic sleeve with a basic photocopied cover, available from Howards Alias gigs and Skylar's official website, before being remixed and re-released with new cover art and an additional two songs by Do The Dog Music in April 2006.

On 4 December 2006, Skylar supported the seminal modern reggae outfit Easy Star All-Stars at The Brook in Southampton, UK. Skylar have also been making progress on their second album.

==== Drawings ====
Drawings is an indie/alternative/post-punk outfit, including two former members of Howards Alias (Matthew Reynolds and David Ransom), with the additional appointment of Aaron Graham on the drum set. Drawings became active in late 2008, playing shows in and around the Southampton area. The band also spent time in Ashburton, Devon, demoing songs with good friend producer/engineer Peter Miles at Holne Bridge studios, for potential inclusion on future Drawings releases.

Since the band's inception in 2008, the trio have released several singles via the group's Myspace page for streaming, prior to being available for free download. 2008 resulted in the songs "Sick to My Heart" and "Friends", while the band released both "Sore Thumb" and "Wallpaper" in 2009.

15 August 2009 saw the band release their debut EP, The Seven Deadly Sins, and play their first headlining show in support of the release at Hamptons in the trio's headquarters of Southampton. The EP was recorded and produced by the band themselves; however, it was mixed and mastered by Peter Miles.

The Seven Deadly Sins's release was described as a "concept" recording with each track named after one of the seven deadly sins, (sloth, gluttony, wrath, greed, lust, envy and pride), as Matthew Reynolds believed that he could write a song about each of the seven deadly sins in the context of his life and his view on the good and bad elements of each alleged sin.

== Members ==
- Matthew Reynolds – guitar, vocals
- Nick Horne – trombone, keyboard, trumpet and backing vocals
- Matthew Roberts – tenor saxophone and backing vocals
- Robert King – drums
- David 'Ranny' Ransom – bass

== Former members ==
- Christopher Murphy (1999–2002) – bass guitar
- Rob Griffin (1999–2003) – trumpet
- Jevon Snell (2001–2005) – drums
- Stevie McCusker (2002–2005) – bass
- Jon Warren (2005) – drums
- Lloyd Williams (2005) – drums
- Peter Miles (2005, 2006–2007) – bass, backing vocals
- Peter Liddle (2007) – bass guitar

== Discography ==
=== Albums ===
- The Chameleon Script (Good Clean Fun Records, 2002)
- The Answer Is Never (Household Name Records, 2004)
- Beat Heart, Beat (Household Name Records, 2005)
- [ep.i.phan.ic] (self-released, 2008)

=== EPs ===
- Howards Alias (self-released, 2000)
- Howards Alias vs. Identity#1 (with Identity No. 1) (self-released, 2001)
- The Split E.P. (with Desa) (Good Clean Fun Records, 2004)
- Howards Alias (Demo) (self-released, 2007)
