= What If Punk Never Happened =

2008 single by The King Blues

Song by The King Blues

from the album Save the World. Get the Girl
- Language: English
- Recorded: 2008
- Genre: Spoken word, art punk
- Length: 6:40
- Label: Field, Island
- Songwriter(s): Jonny "Itch" Fox, Peter Miles
- Producer(s): Peter Miles, Clive Langer

"What If Punk Never Happened" is a song recorded by English punk rock band The King Blues, and is the eleventh and final track on their second studio album Save the World. Get the Girl. It is a 6-minute and 40-second spoken word song which tells a story of what a town would be like had they never discovered punk.

The track was co-written by producer Peter Miles who recorded the backing track after Itch emailed him an mp3 of the rough draft of the original poem and Itch's final vocal was laid down a few weeks later during the final mixing sessions of the album.

Despite its length and its lyrics which contain several expletives, the track has been played on BBC Radio 1 by Rob da Bank, Mike Davies, and as part of the "Versus" section of Zane Lowe's show.

"What If Punk Never Happened" has been remixed by Dan Le Sac vs Scroobius Pip. The King Blues have also made the original a cappella available for free download to enable anyone to remix it.

== Bands mentioned in the song ==
There are many bands name-dropped in the song. In order, these are:

- The Beatles,
- Nirvana,
- Green Day,
- Sex Pistols,
- Sham 69,
- 4 Skins,
- The Ramones,
- The Buzzcocks,
- Crass,
- The Vandals,
- Dead Kennedys,
- Rancid,
- Sick of it All,
- Madball,
- GG Allin,
- Refused,
- Poison Idea,
- Minor Threat,
- Against Me!,
- Operation Ivy,
- Blitz (band),
- The Clash,
- Disorder,
- Propagandhi,
- The Exploited,
- and NOFX.
