= Deconstruction Tour =

Music festival

Deconstruction Tour was a one-day punk music and skate festival that was staged in various countries across Europe. It first took place in 1999 and occurred annually until 2006. The tour was arranged by Destiny Tourbooking. In general, the tour offered the opening slot of each day to a local, often unsigned band, with the following acts increasing in notability throughout the lineup. The festival also included displays by BMX riders and skaters.

Aside from the first year, 2006 was possibly the least successful for the tour, due to problems with booking bands and the limited number of dates that were booked. The tour has not gone ahead since 2006.

== Previous lineups ==
=== 1999 ===
- NOFX
- Lagwagon
- Beatsteaks
- H_{2}O
- 59 Times The Pain
- Dogpiss

=== 2000 ===
- NOFX
- Good Riddance
- Mighty Mighty Bosstones (not all dates)
- Snapcase
- Terrorgruppe
- Guttermouth
- Mad Caddies
- Less Than Jake (Some dates)
- Snuff (Some dates)

=== 2001 ===
- Pennywise
- Sick of it All
- Avail
- Boysetsfire
- Snuff
- Catch 22
- Bouncing Souls
- Beatsteaks
- Lagwagon
- Capdown
- SR-71

=== 2002 ===
- Lagwagon
- Mighty Mighty Bosstones
- Lostprophets
- Mad Caddies
- H_{2}O
- All
- The Movielife
- Midtown
- Randy
- The Turbo A.C.'s
- Flogging Molly
- Fletcher

=== 2003 ===
- NOFX
- Boysetsfire
- Bouncing Souls
- Thrice
- T.S.O.L.
- Terrorgruppe
- Real McKenzies
- Fabulous Disaster
- Strung Out
- Flogging Molly
- Donots

=== 2004 ===
- Pennywise
- Lagwagon
- Anti-Flag
- Beatsteaks
- The Slackers
- Strike Anywhere
- Pulley
- MxPx
- Yellowcard
- 1208
- The Movement

=== 2005 ===
- Mad Caddies
- Boysetsfire
- Strike Anywhere
- Only Crime
- Strung Out (started on 5 May)
- From Autumn to Ashes (until 8 May)
- Smoke or Fire (until 8 May)
- Capdown (until 7 May)

Select dates:

- Lagwagon (first two dates only)
- Tribute to Nothing (London)
- Captain Everything! (London)
- NoComply (Manchester)
- Uncommonmenfrommars (French dates only)
- Banda Bassotti (Trier, Winterthur and Sesto San Giovanni dates only)
- Streetlight Manifesto (Trier)
- Mad Sin (Winterthur)
- Burning Heads (Grenade)

=== 2006 ===
- Pennywise
- Boysetsfire
- Thursday (Cancelled due to "family reasons" before playing)
- Bouncing Souls
- Mad Sin
- Alec Empire

== Future ==
There was no tour in 2007, and although the organisers hoped to bring it back for 2008, it appears that there will be no further Deconstruction Tours.
