= Punk & Poetry =

Studio album by The King Blues
- Released: 17 April 2011
- Recorded: November 2010, Devon, Great Britain
- Genre: Ska punk; alternative rock; electronic; punk rock
- Length: 30:06
- Label: Transmission Recordings
- Producer: Peter Miles

The King Blues chronology
| Save the World. Get the Girl (2008) | Punk & Poetry (2011) | Long Live The Struggle (2012) |

Singles from Punk & Poetry
- 1. "Headbutt" Released: 16 May 2010; 2. "Set the World on Fire" Released: 10 April 2011; 3. "I Want You"; 4. "The Future's Not What It Used to Be"; 5. "Does Anybody Care About Us?"

Punk & Poetry is the third album by The King Blues. It was released on 17 April 2011 on digital download, and on CD the following day. The track listing for the album was released on 5 March 2011 on their website, and featured the previously released "Headbutt" single, which reached number 72 upon release in May 2010. "We Are Fucking Angry" was made available as a free to download on 27 January 2011. Their second single off the album, "Set the World on Fire" got its first play on Mike Davies Radio 1 punk show on 8 February 2011, and was announced that it would be released on 10 April 2011. Itch announced on both Facebook and Twitter that 'I Want You' would be released as the third single.

Punk & Poetry entered the UK Albums Chart at number 31.

== Album themes ==
In a podcast with Kerrang!, Jamie Jazz & Jonny 'Itch' Fox go through the album track by track, explaining what each song is about. Itch explains that the opening track "Last of the Dreamers" is "a call out for all the people unspoken for". The next song, "We Are Fucking Angry" which is the lead single from the album (which has become a popular anarchist slogan), Itch tells that the song was written after seeing the student protests, which was made to "blare out of our sound system", and they wanted "a full on, in your face, punchy kind of punk rock track".

The third song off the album, "Set the World on Fire", Itch says the song is "not accepting that the convenience of modern life is necessarily a good thing, or honest way to live, but questioning it, and questioning how we've got to a point where in some places in the world, they're making these things for us, and here we just use them and spending them freely". Jamie Jazz adds "Musically, when we first wrote it, it was an out and out hardcore track, it was nice to get it into the studio and take that rawness and break it down a little bit, pull it apart and put it back together, and I think it's a much better song now". "Dancehall", according to Itch is "about living your life as a celebration really". "The Future's Not What It Used to Be" is about how the generation now are told they can't enjoy life as much as previous generations, and have been put in an unfair scenario because of a previous generations mistakes. Itch explains that "it's about hoping that kids can hear it and realise that although it seems doom & gloom, the answers lie with them and the power lies with kids, the power to change their lives and transform their lives, be whoever they want to be is down to them at the end of the day".

The next song, "I Want You" was made because "we wanted to write a buzzcock, fun, 70s pop punk song, and that's what we did", according to Jamie.

== Track listing ==
| No. | Title | Writer(s) | Length |
|---|---|---|---|
| 1. | "Last of the Dreamers" | Jonny 'Itch' Fox | 0:58 |
| 2. | "We Are Fucking Angry" | Jonny 'Itch' Fox / Peter Miles | 3:04 |
| 3. | "Set the World on Fire" | Jonny 'Itch' Fox | 2:54 |
| 4. | "Dancehall" | Jonny 'Itch' Fox | 0:51 |
| 5. | "The Future's Not What It Used to Be" | Jonny 'Itch' Fox | 3:56 |
| 6. | "I Want You" | Jonny 'Itch' Fox | 2:23 |
| 7. | "5 Bottles of Shampoo" | Jonny 'Itch' Fox | 2:01 |
| 8. | "Sex Education" | Jonny 'Itch' Fox | 2:39 |
| 9. | "Shooting Fascists" | Jonny 'Itch' Fox | 0:47 |
| 10. | "Headbutt" | Jonny 'Itch' Fox / Peter Miles | 3:19 |
| 11. | "Does Anybody Care About Us?" | Jonny 'Itch' Fox | 3:35 |
| 12. | "Everything Happens for a Reason" | Jonny 'Itch' Fox | 3:50 |
| Total length: | | | 30:07 |

HMV Exclusive Download Content TRANSCD006
| No. | Title | Length |
|---|---|---|
| 13. | "5 Bottles of Shampoo" (Live 2011) | 3:24 |
| 14. | "Headbutt" (Live 2011) | 3:23 |
| 15. | "Set the World on Fire" (Live 2011) | 2:50 |
| 16. | "Shooting Fascists" (Live 2011) | 1:20 |
| 17. | "The Future's Not What It Used to Be" (Live 2011) | 4:06 |
| 18. | "Headbutt" (Music Video) | 3:28 |
| 19. | "iPhone Wallpapers" (3 different versions) |

iTunes
| No. | Title | Length |
|---|---|---|
| 13. | "Set the World on Fire" (Music Video) | 2:51 |

Note: All songs written by Jonny 'Itch' Fox, except "We Are Fucking Angry" which was written by Jonny 'Itch' Fox and Peter Miles.

=== Editions ===
- A Standard CD
- A HMV Exclusive Special Edition. This featured a music-pin code that allowed the purchaser the option to downloaded additional live versions, wallpapers and a video of the track "Headbutt".
- iTunes LP

== Personnel ==
- Jonny 'Itch' Fox – Lead vocals, ukulele
- Jamie Jazz – Guitar, backing vocals
- Peter Miles – Programming, bass, guitar, percussion, synths
- Dean Ashton – Bass, backing vocals, keyboards, guitar
- Luke Leighfield – Piano, Hammond
- Jack Usher – Drums, percussion, backing vocals
- Kat Marsh – Backing vocals, bass
- Josh Waters Rudge – Guitar
- Marcia Richards – Flute, Hammond, keyboards, piano
- George Lindsay – Drums
- Josie Dobson – Piano
- Alex White – Piano
- Will Harvey – Violin
- Charlie Rusbridger – Cello
- The King Blues Choir – Gang vocals

== Chart performance ==
| Chart (2011) | Peak position | Certification | Sales |
|---|---|---|---|
| UK Albums Chart | 31 | | |

== Charting singles ==
| Year | Single | Chart | Position |
|---|---|---|---|
| 2010 | "Headbutt" | UK Singles Chart | 72 |
| 2011 | "Set the World on Fire" | UK Singles Chart | |
