= Anti-life =

"Antilife" means antagonistic or antithetical to normal human values, as with:

- Dehumanization
- Misanthropy
- Nuclear weapons
- Sexual repression

Anti-life may also refer to:

== Fiction ==
- The Anti-Life Equation, in Jack Kirby's Fourth World comics
- The Anti-Life, a character in "The Alternative Factor", an episode of Star Trek
- Anti-life, a stone in the 2003 fantasy novel Death Masks
- Anti-Life, alternate title for the 2020 science-fiction film Breach

== Music ==
- "The Anti-Life", a song by Howards Alias from their album The Chameleon Script
- "The Anti-Life", a song by Skylar from their album Skylar
- Disiplin Anti-Life, a CD published by Moonfog Productions

== Politics ==
- As a pejorative term:
  - Favoring the abortion-rights movement or the availability of contraception
  - Favoring antinatalism
  - Favoring capital punishment

== See also ==
- Mirror life
