= Lightyear (band) =

British ska punk band

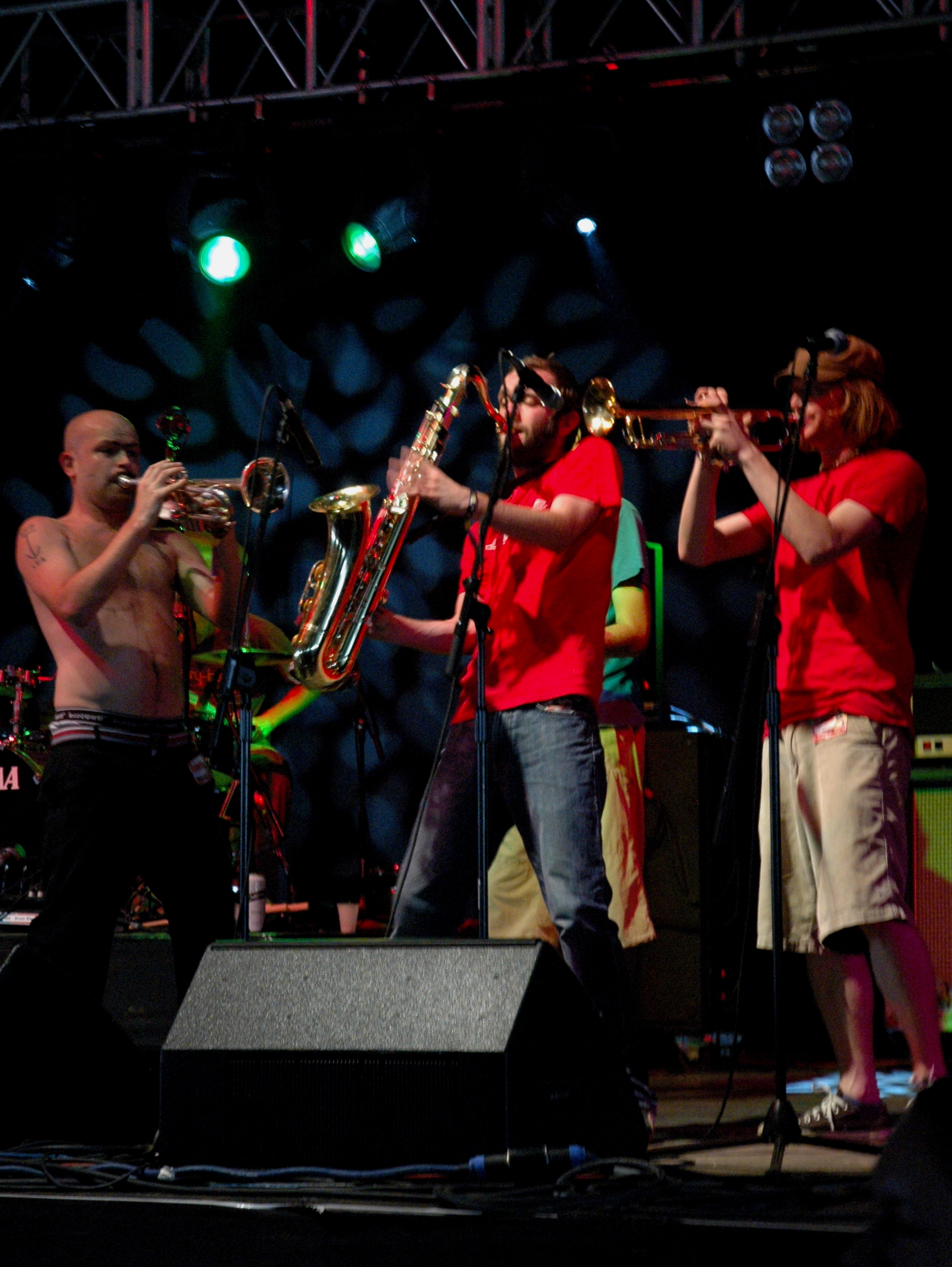
- Lightyear performing at the Leeds Festival, Bramham Park in 2006 The band members from L–R: Neil Draycott, Ben Ashton and Mark Wood

Background information
- Origin: Derby, Derbyshire, England
- Genre: Ska punk
- Years active: 1997–2003, 2006, 2007, 2012, 2015, 2017–present
- Label: Household Name
- Members: Chas Palmer-Williams; Neil Draycott; Neil 'Nelb' Cowie; Mark Wood; Ben Ashton; Jim Harrison; Lee Robotham; Kraig Winterbottom; Richard Barling

Lightyear is a seven-piece British ska punk band formed in Derby, England, in 1997. They were part of a UK music scene that mixed ska punk with other genres including funk, indie-rock and hip-hop. The band signed to Household Name Records in 2001, and released two full-length albums before splitting in 2003. Since 2006 the band have had a number of reunions.

== Biography ==
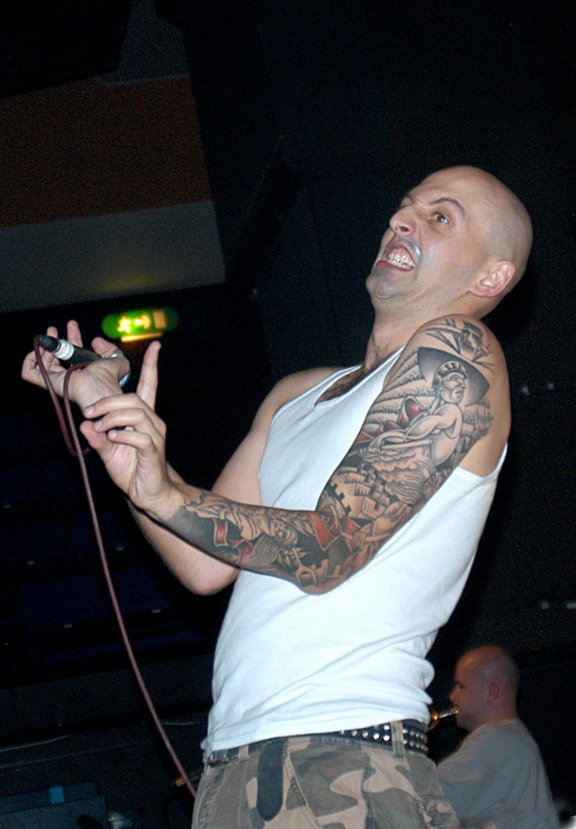
Vocalist Chas Palmer-Williams, Derby Assembly Rooms, 26 September 2003

The band formed in 1997, with their first gig in their hometown of Derby in 1998. Lightyear released their debut album Call of the Weasel Clan in October 2001. In 2002 they appeared at the Carling Weekend Festivals with Sick of It All and Alkaline Trio. The band are known for their feel good vibes and exuberant mosh-pits.

Lightyear began work on their second album Chris Gentlemens Hairdresser and Railway Bookshop in April 2003 with producer Dave Chang, having already decided to split up after recording the album and touring twice more; once in support of the album, followed by a farewell tour. The album was released in July 2003, accompanied by a tour with Captain Everything! and Jerry-built. They played what was supposed to be their last show on 26 September 2003 at the Assembly Rooms in Derby, supported by Evil Macaroni, Captain Everything! and Adequate Seven.

=== Post split ===
On 9 May 2006, DJ Mike Davies announced on the Radio 1 Lock Up Show that Lightyear would be reforming for a fortnight long tour around the UK, finishing in Derby. Originally dubbed the "Twelve Days of Chaos" tour, it was renamed the "Lightyear ...Would Like to Apologise in Advance" tour, as more promoters took interest. Davies invite them to play a set on his Radio 1 Lock Up stage at the Carling Weekend Festivals at Reading and Leeds. The band split up on stage for the second time on 26 August 2006 at the Carling Weekend Festival at Bramham Park, Leeds. Shortly afterwards, Lightyear performed a final 'friends & family only' gig at The Victoria Inn, Derby. Subsequent one-off shows took place in Derby at the Assembly Rooms (November 2007) and The Venue (October 2009).

In March 2012, it was announced across social networking sites that Lightyear were going to reform for a six-show mini-tour, sponsored by Big Cheese magazine. In the same year Banquet Records reissued both albums on vinyl.

They returned again 2015 to play several shows, including the Slam Dunk Festival in Leeds.

In May 2017, Lightyear an announced on Facebook that they would be reforming. The band stated that this time it's a 'proper reunion' not just for a one-off tour and there will be new material. They toured in October and started a crowdfunding campaign to make a documentary about the band and the UK scene it is part of.

== Touring ==
The band have been on tour with Capdown, Mad Caddies, Goldfinger, Slow Gherkin, 311, Mustard Plug, Big D and the Kids Table, Save Ferris, Nerf Herder, The Peacocks, Link 80 and Suicide Machines. They also played at 'Holidays in the Sun' for two years running (alongside The Business, The Exploited and more).

== Influence ==
Drowned in Sound listed them as one of the important bands that made up the UK underground's ska punk scene. The publication noted that Chris Gentlemens Hairdresser and Railway Book Shop transcended the scene to appeal to a wider audience.

== Members ==
- Ben Ashton – tenor saxophone, baritone saxophone, additional vocals
- Richard 'Bars' Barling – bass and backing vocals
- Neil 'Nelb' Cowie – guitar, additional vocals
- Neil Draycott – acoustic guitar, trumpet and vocals (also a member of Cotton Weary)
- Jim Harrison – drums
- Chas Palmer-Williams – vocals (also a member of Cotton Weary)
- Kraig Winterbottom – trumpet, additional vocals
- Mark Wood – trumpet, additional vocals

=== Guest musicians ===
- Dan Sanfey – vocals (member of Five Knuckle)
- Kassim Basma – vocals (member of Adequate Seven)
- Tom Pinder – trombone (member of Adequate Seven)
- Joey Malibu & Coke – scratching
- Lewis Froy – vocals – (member of Captain Everything!)
- Jon Whitehouse – vocals (member of Captain Everything!)

== Discography ==
As well as two albums Lightyear also released a split EP with friends Evil Macaroni, a 'demo', and contributed to several international punk compilation CDs.

=== Albums ===
- Call of the Weasel Clan (Household Name Records, 2001) (vinyl re-release Banquet Records, 2012)
- Chris Gentlemens Hairdresser and Railway Book Shop (Household Name Records, 2003) (vinyl re-release Banquet Records, 2012)

=== EPs ===
- Lightyear Vs. Evil Macaroni (Positive Outlook, 2000)
- Lightyear & Slow Gherkin (Pookout Records, 2026)

=== Singles ===
- "Just Another Demonstration" (self-released, 2000)

=== Music videos ===
- "A Pack of Dogs" (2001)

== Other projects ==
Draycott and Palmer-Williams played together in another band called Cotton Weary. In 2009, Palmer-Williams started a solo folk punk project under his own name, releasing an EP (We Showed Them, Didn't We) in 2010 and a full-length album (American Smile, British Teeth) in 2015.
