= Beat Heart, Beat =

Studio album by Howards Alias
- Released: 4 July 2005
- Recorded: 2005
- Genre: Rock
- Length: 55:48
- Label: Household Name Records HAUS075
- Producer: Peter Miles

Howards Alias chronology
The Answer Is Never (2004)	Beat Heart, Beat (2005)	(ep.i.phan.ic) (2008)

Professional ratings
Review scores
Source	Rating
State of Emergency	5/5

Beat Heart, Beat is the third full-length album recorded by the Southampton-based Ska punk band Howards Alias.

The album was released by Household Name Records on 4 July 2005 on compact disc. Less of an extreme leap and more of a natural progression from their previous album The Answer Is Never, the album saw the addition of a keyboard (played by the multi-talented Nicholas Horne) and the arrival of new drummer Jon Warren; formerly of Workin Lunch.

Household Name Records' press release stated that Beat Heart, Beat:

features the bands strongest set of songs to date. With shimmering production, the band moves from crashing emotional rock, through upbeat post-hardcore, to atmospheric melodic riffing with introspective, intelligent lyrics. Following on a mere 10 months [it was actually 13 months] after the brilliantly received "The Answer Is Never" with comparisons to Biffy Clyro, The Mars Volta, and RX Bandits, Howards Alias' new album looks set to cement their reputation as ones to watch break out in the new exciting UK underground scene.

A song titled Note to Self was listed as track 9 on an early list, but was cut from the album as the band felt that it disrupted the flow. The song was later released as a download-only single by Household Name Records as the band's 'swansong' release (prior to their 2006 reformation).

== Track listing ==
1. "Wrong Note"
2. "Rabbit in Headlights"
3. "Exit on Left"
4. "Difflam"
5. "The Explanation"
6. "Maggie and Me Pt 1 (The Glance)"
7. "Esprit D'escalier"
8. "The Drive"
9. "Maggie and Me Pt 2 (The Fall)"
10. "Blessing or Curse?"
11. "... if it wasn't screwed on"
12. "Time for Bed"
13. "Sleeper, Sleeper"
