= NoComply =

English punk rock band

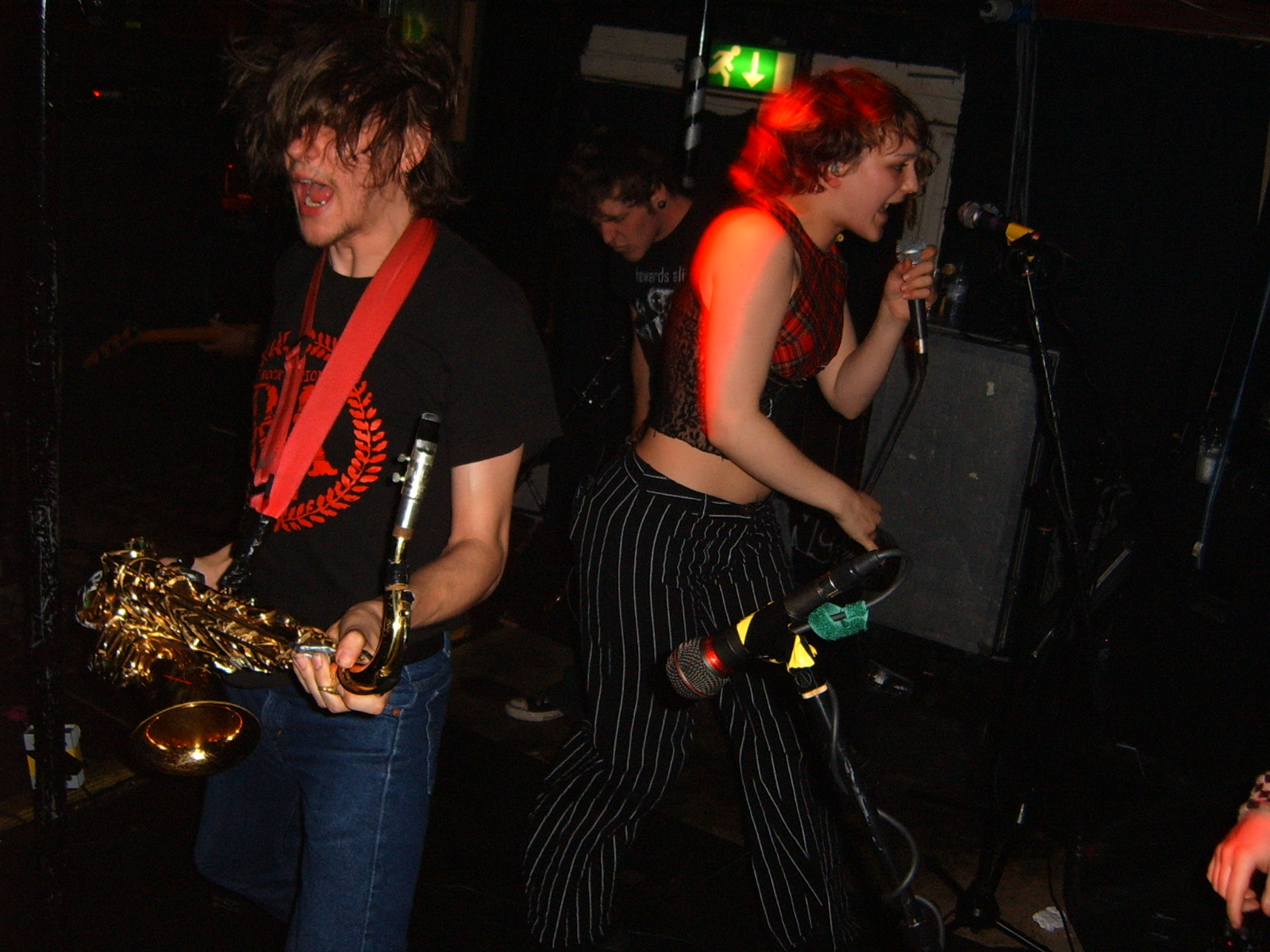
- Matt and Kelly of NoComply

Background information
- Origin: Plymouth, UK
- Genre: Punk rock
- Years active: 1998–2006, 2026-present
- Label: Deck Cheese
- Members: Kelly Kemp; Jon Dailey; Nick Wallace; Si Marsh; Oz Holden; Matt Roberts

NoComply are a metal-influenced punk rock sextet hailing from Plymouth, Devon in the south of England, initially active between 1998 and 2006 and reuniting in 2026. They were one of several UK bands mixing ska punk with other genres in the early 2000s.

== History ==
NoComply formed in the autumn of 1998. The founder members were Kelly (vocals), Jon (guitars), and Nick (bass). The final line up was completed by Si (drums), Oz (trombone), and Matt (saxophone). They took their name from the skateboarding trick known as "no comply". Early incarnations of the band were driven by covering the likes of Pennywise and AFI in Jon's bed, all learnt from the internet. In these early years the band produced three demos Never Unknown, Bring It On, and Should Have Guessed. The band honed their sound as they introduced a brass section into the proceedings and in 2001 recorded their demo Misuse of Control. The band's evolution took them into the altogether harder territory of ska-core pioneered by underground legends like CapDown and Link 80.

The band went straight out on the road with Asian Man Records' MU330 on a mammoth UK tour. It wasn't long after that the band came to the attention of the Big Cheese Magazine offshoot Deck Cheese Records & they joined to their roster in the summer of 2002.

NoComply headed into the studio in August 2002 to record three new tracks for their debut EP on Deck Cheese. Two of the tracks from the aforementioned Misuse of Control were added to finish the EP that is Your Life (Is Your Direction). This EP was released in September 2002, the new recordings heavier and more powerful than ever before.

NoComply supported the likes of RX Bandits, Capdown, Lightyear and even pop punk band Good Charlotte. In the summer of 2003 NoComply made their first trip over to mainland Europe with Honest Don's nerd core boys Nerf Herder. Upon their return NoComply were invited to the BBC's Maida Vale studio to do a session for Radio 1's The Lock Up show. In November 2003 the video for Your Life (Is Your Direction) debuted at number 2 in the Scuzz TV chart, only being pipped at the top slot by Funeral for a Friend.

NoComply recorded their full-length debut album for Deck Cheese records entitled With Windmills Turning Wrong Directions at No Recording Studios with John Hannon (Five Knuckle, Adequate 7) at the production helm during February and March 2004. Released shortly after, Punktastic said the record showed musical progression, noting the band successfully combined heavy and ska sounds.

The band opened the UK leg of the 2004 Deconstruction festival and also headlined the second stage at the Hell's Angels Bulldog Bash. NoComply also found themselves appearing at the Leeds leg of the 2004 Carling Weekend festival. Further UK touring was followed by a tour of mainland Europe. 2005 saw the band appear at the Radio One Lock Up Stage of both legs of the Carling Weekend followed shortly by two support dates with Alkaline Trio and Me First and the Gimme Gimmes in Germany.

On 23 January 2006, the band announced their intention to split up.

On 2 September 2026, the band announced their reunion to take place at the 2027 edition of Manchester Punk Festival, in addition to releasing a previously unreleased EP.

== Discography ==
Year	Title	Label	Type
2001	Misuse of Control	Self-released	Demo
2002	Your Life (Is Your Direction)	Deck Cheese	EP
2004	With Windmills Turning Wrong Directions	Deck Cheese	Album
2005	Unleash the Fury	Deck Cheese	DVD
2005	The Price of You	Deck Cheese	Single

== See also ==
- Antimaniax
