= Pound for the Sound =

Studio album by Capdown
- Released: 10 September 2001
- Recorded: June–July 2001
- Studio: Philia Studios, Henley-on-Thames
- Genre: Ska-core
- Length: 39:24
- Label: Household Name
- Producer: Dave Chang

Capdown chronology
| Civil Disobedients (2000) | Pound for the Sound (2001) | Wind Up Toys (2007) |

Professional ratings
Review scores
| Source | Rating |
|---|---|
| Kerrang! | 4/5 stars |
| Punknews.org | 3.5/5 stars |
| Punktastic | 4.5/5 stars |

Pound for the Sound is the second full-length studio album by UK ska punk band Capdown, released on 10 September 2001 by the London-based indie label Household Name Records. It is the follow-up to the previous year's Civil Disobedients. The songs are a mix of hardcore and the ska-core sound. The lyrics in the album show a positive attitude towards life and lyrical themes include overcoming tough situations and racism (the song "Judgement Days"). "Dub #2" is the only instrumental. The album peaked at #43 on the UK Independent Albums Chart. Pound for the Sound received critical acclaim from publications such as Kerrang! who described it as "damn near perfect" and awarded it 4 K's out of 5.

== Track listing ==
All music by Capdown. All lyrics by Jake Sims-Fielding.

Pound for the Sound
| No. | Title | Length |
|---|---|---|
| 1. | "Faith No More" | 3:31 |
| 2. | "What Doesn't Kill You" | 3:03 |
| 3. | "Strength In Numbers" | 3:34 |
| 4. | "Judgement Days" | 3:11 |
| 5. | "An A-Political Stand Of Reasons" | 4:14 |
| 6. | "Time To Get Out" | 3:29 |
| 7. | "Pound For The Sound" | 3:32 |
| 8. | "Dub #2" | 2:50 |
| 9. | "Progression vs Punk Rock" | 4:32 |
| 10. | "Dealer Fever" | 3:46 |
| 11. | "6-8-1" | 3:42 |
| Total length: | | 39:24 |

== Personnel ==
Credits adapted from liner notes.

Capdown

- Jake Sims-Fielding – vocals, saxophone
- Keith Minter – guitar, backing vocals
- Robin "Boob" Goold – bass guitar
- Tim Macdonald – drums

Production

- Dave Chang – recording and mixing
- Martin Barbour – additional mixing

Artwork

- Adamski

== Release history ==
| Country | Date | Label | Format | Catalogue number |
|---|---|---|---|---|
| United Kingdom | 10 September 2001 | Household Name Records | CD | HAUS043 |
| United Kingdom | 2002 | Rugger Bugger Discs | Vinyl | SEEP035LP |
