= The Take (Welsh band) =

Welsh punk rock band

- Also known as: Fishtake (1996–2002)
- Origin: Cardiff, Wales
- Genres: Emo; post-hardcore; melodic hardcore
- Years active: 1996–2007; 2010
- Labels: Household Name, Bombed Out
- Past members: Jim Williams; Paul Copner; Pete Leakey; Richard Crayford; Charles Curran; Will Rees; Nathan Phillips

The Take were a Welsh punk rock band from Cardiff, Wales. Formed in 1996 under the name Fishtake, the band helped to establish the south Wales hardcore scene. They released two studio albums, two extended plays and one demo.

== History ==
The band was formed in Cardiff, Wales in 1996 as Fishtake by Jim Williams (drums), Paul Copner (guitar) and Richard Crayford (bass). They began by covering Nirvana songs in a warehouse on Barry Island. Charles Curran joined on bass when Crayford left in 1998. Alongside No Fit State, Public Disturbance and No Choice, the band quickly became a part of an emerging wave of south Wales bands taking influence from United States hardcore.

In 1999, they released the demo Ensure This is Your Medicine. Will Rees, formerly of Four Letter Word, soon joined as drummer, solidifying the lineup with Williams on guitar and vocals, Copner on guitar, Curran on bass, and Rees on drums. In November 2000, they recorded an extended play, Private Foul And Surface Water, which was self-released through The 23:59 Label. To support the release, the band undertook a tour of the UK with Cardiff band Douglas in spring 2001. Copner was unable to join this tour, so his role was temporarily filled with Pete Leakey from Brecon-based punk band No Comply

In August 2001, they recorded their debut full length album Propeller at Prism Studio, Stoke-on-Trent with Shaun Lowe. Copner left the band shortly after and Leakey officially joined as guitarist. Around this time, they changed their name to The Take. Curran gave the recording to Katherine "Kafren" Vik of Household Name Records, who signed the band and soon organised for them to open for the Dillinger Four in London. The album was released on 4 November 2002. They released the Gene Pool + 2 EP that same year. To support the album, they toured with The Lawrence Arms and Belvedere.

On the 15th January 2003, The Take recorded a live session for BBC Radio 1’s "Bethan and Huw Show", at Monnow Valley Studio in Monmouth, Wales. Will Rees left the band in 2003 and was replaced by Nathan Phillips, formerly of the band Douglas. At the end of 2004, they entered Prism Studio with Shaun Lowe. Two of the songs recorded during this session, were included on their 2005 split EP with band Night and the City of Broken Promises, released by Détournement Records. The remaining tracks were released as the album Dolomite in 2006. The album was released on CD by Leeds based label Bombed Out Records and on vinyl by Détournement Records/Art For Blind, followed by a tour with Yorkshire band Calcutecs. On 4 October 2006, The Take recorded a second live session for BBC Radio 1's Bethan and Huw Show, at Stir Studio in Cardiff.

The band played their final show on 6 April 2007 at Clwb Ifor Bach, Cardiff. In July 2010, they reformed for a two performances, commemorating John Sicolo, owner of the venue TJ's, alongside a reformed Douglas.

== Musical style ==
Critics have categorised their music as post-hardcore, emo, melodic hardcore and gruff punk. They merged elements of hardcore punk and indie rock. Their music was melodic and dissonant, including complex instrumentals and elements of progressive and pop music.

They cited influences including Jawbox, Samiam, Jawbreaker, Shootin' Goon, Public Disturbance and Douglas.

== Members ==
- Jim Williams – guitar, vocals (1999–2007, 2010), drums (1996–1999)
- Paul Copner – guitar (1996–2002)
- Pete Leakey - guitar (2002-2007, 2010)
- Richard Crayford – bass (1996–1998)
- Charles Curran – bass (1998–2007, 2010)
- Will Rees – drums (1999–2003)
- Nathan Phillips – drums (2003–2007, 2010)

== Discography ==
Studio albums

- Propeller (2002)
- Dolomite (2006)

EPs

- Gene Pool + 2 (2001)
- Night & The City / The Take (2005, split EP with Night and the City of Broken Promises)

Demos

- Ensure This is Your Medicine (1999)
