= The Answer Is Never =

The Answer is Never

Studio album by Howards Alias
- Released: 7 June 2004
- Recorded: 2004
- Genre: Rock
- Length: 61:24
- Label: Household Name Records HAUS070
- Producer: Peter Miles

Howards Alias chronology
The Chameleon Script (2002)	The Answer is Never (2004)	Beat Heart, Beat (2005)

Professional ratings
Review scores
Source	Rating
Indigo Flow	4/5 stars

The Answer is Never is the second full-length album recorded by the band Howards Alias.

The album was released by Household Name Records on 7 June 2004 on compact disc. A huge leap in terms of quality of both songwriting and production in comparison to debut The Chameleon Script, this was the sound of a much more mature and less ska punk-influenced Howards Alias.

As the band had become a quartet by this point, it was up to the multi-talented Nicholas Horne to play both trumpet and trombone during the recording process. This added a subtle irony to the fact that the album was touted as being 'closer to the live sound of Howards Alias', as did the inclusion of a string instrument section on certain songs.

Clocking in at just over an hour in length, The Answer is Never is commonly regarded as Howards Alias' best altogether album.

The album artwork was provided by UK comic book artist, Chronic Fatigue.

== Track listing ==
1. "Chasing Amy"
2. "The Weekend Trip"
3. "Anthem for Doomed Youth"
4. "Blossom"
5. "W.O.R.L.D."
6. "Underground"
7. "Love Loss Learn"
8. "40 Winks"
9. "Elizabeth's Song"
10. "June 3"
11. "The Grandeur Challenge"
12. "Song for a Friend"
13. "Advent for the Zealous"
14. "The Drop"
15. "The Awakening"
16. "The End"
