= Headbutt (disambiguation) =

A headbutt is a targeted strike with the head, usually to another person's head.

Headbutt may also refer to:

- Headbutt (sculpture), by French artist Adel Abdessemed, at the Centre Pompidou in Paris, France
- "Headbutt" (song), by The King Blues (2010)

== See also ==
- "Headbutts", a song by John Otway and Wild Willy Barrett
