= Sam Kendal =

Sam Kendal may refer to:

- Sam Kendal, drummer on Left for Dead (EP)
- Sam Kendal, character in Last Resort (U.S. TV series)

== See also ==
- Samuel Kendall, Republican politician
