= Duck and cover (disambiguation) =

Duck and cover is a safety drill taught during the Cold War.

Duck and cover may also refer to:

== Film and television ==
- Duck and Cover (film), a 1952 American educational film
- "Duck and Cover" (Catscratch), a 2007 television episode
- "Duck and Cover" (The West Wing), a 2006 television episode
- "Duck and Cover" (The Wire), a 2003 television episode

== Music ==
- Duck and Cover (German band), a 1980s avant-rock band
- Duck and Cover (album), a 1998 album by Mad Caddies
- Duck and Cover (compilation), a 1990 album of cover songs by punk bands
- "Duck and Cover", a 2005 song by Glen Phillips from Winter Pays for Summer
- "Duck and Cover", a 2006 song by the King Blues from Under the Fog
