= Under the Fog =

Under The Fog

Studio album by The King Blues
- Released: June 2006; 2007; 18 February 2008
- Recorded: 2006, 2008
- Genre: Folk punk; Ska Punk
- Length: 36:17 (2006); 36:08 (2007); 38:29 (2008)
- Label: Household Name Records, Field Records, Tartan Records
- Producer: Peter Miles

The King Blues chronology
Under The Fog (2006)	Save the World. Get the Girl (2008)

Professional ratings
Review scores
Source	Rating
AllMusic	3.5/5 stars

Under The Fog is the debut album by The King Blues, originally released by Household Name Records in 2006 and later re-released on Field Records, a subsidiary of Island Records in 2008. The album spawned two singles, "Mr. Music Man" and "Come Fi Di Youth".

In 2007, 1000 limited edition 180gms hand pressed vinyl albums were released via Household Name Records/Tartan Rex. These included the bonus track "If Genghis Khan Then Why Can't I"

The 2008 re-release contained many new edits of the original tracks. The Track "Under The Fog" was renamed "We Ain't Never Done" and "Taking Over" and "The Sound of Revolt" swapped places on the track listings.

The album was originally recorded in their living room in the space of four days during June 2006. It contains a hidden track, a cover of My Boy Lollipop, made famous by the Jamaican artist Millie Small in 1964.

== Track listings ==
=== 2006 Household Name Records release ===
No.	Title	Writer(s)	Length
1.	"Intro"	The King Blues	2:41
2.	"Blood on My Hands"	Jonny 'Itch' Fox & Charlie Wilson	2:11
3.	"Under The Fog"	Jonny 'Itch' Fox & Jamie Jazz	1:49
4.	"Mr. Music Man"	Jonny 'Itch' Fox	2:10
5.	"Come Fi Di Youth" (Music by Chris Goodman)	Jonny 'Itch' Fox	4:45
6.	"Taking Over"	Jonny 'Itch' Fox	3:46
7.	"If I Had A Coin..."	Jonny 'Itch' Fox	2:55
8.	"Chimp in a 3 Piece Suit"	Jonny 'Itch' Fox & Charlie Wilson	2:20
9.	"Duck And Cover"	Jonny 'Itch' Fox	1:18
10.	"The Sound Of Revolt"	Jonny 'Itch' Fox	2:46
11.	"Getting Out Of Here" (Song ends at 4:22)	Jonny 'Itch' Fox	9:42
12.	"Lollipop" (Hidden Song, begins at 7:20 on track 11)	Millie Smalls	2:22
Total length:			36:17

=== 2007 Household Name Records/Tartan Rex Limited Edition Vinyl release ===
Side A
No.	Title	Writer(s)	Length
1.	"Intro"	The King Blues	2:41
2.	"Blood on My Hands"	Jonny 'Itch' Fox & Charlie Wilson	2:11
3.	"Under The Fog"	Jonny 'Itch' Fox & Jamie Jazz	1:49
4.	"Mr. Music Man"	Jonny 'Itch' Fox	2:10
5.	"Come Fi Di Youth" (Music by Chris Goodman)	Jonny 'Itch' Fox	4:45
6.	"Taking Over"	Jonny 'Itch' Fox	3:46
7.	"If I Had A Coin..."	Jonny 'Itch' Fox	2:55

Side B
No.	Title	Writer(s)	Length
8.	"Chimp in a 3 Piece Suit"	Jonny 'Itch' Fox & Charlie Wilson	2:20
9.	"Duck And Cover"	Jonny 'Itch' Fox	1:18
10.	"The Sound Of Revolt"	Jonny 'Itch' Fox	2:46
11.	"Getting Out Of Here"	Jonny 'Itch' Fox	4:22
12.	"If Genghis Khan Then Why Can't I"	[Not listed]	2:43
13.	"Lollipop" (Track not listed on artwork)	Millie Smalls	2:22
Total length:			36:08

=== 2008 Field Records re-release ===
No.	Title	Writer(s)	Length
1.	"Intro"	The King Blues	2:42
2.	"Blood on My Hands"	Jonny 'Itch' Fox & Charlie Wilson	3:19
3.	"We Ain't Never Done"	Jonny 'Itch' Fox & Jamie Jazz	3:39
4.	"Mr. Music Man"	Jonny 'Itch' Fox	2:30
5.	"Come Fi Di Youth" (Music by Chris Goodman)	Jonny 'Itch' Fox	4:32
6.	"The Sound Of Revolt"	Jonny 'Itch' Fox	2:46
7.	"If I Had A Coin..."	Jonny 'Itch' Fox	2:56
8.	"Chimp in a 3 Piece Suit"	Jonny 'Itch' Fox & Charlie Wilson	2:20
9.	"Duck And Cover"	Jonny 'Itch' Fox	1:18
10.	"Taking Over"	Jonny 'Itch' Fox	2:42
11.	"Getting Out Of Here" (Song ends at 4:22)	Jonny 'Itch' Fox	9:50
12.	"My Boy Lollipop" (Hidden Cover Song by Millie Smalls, begins at 7:20 on track 11)	Morris Levy & Johnny Roberts	2:22
Total length:			38:29
