= Slow Gherkin =

American ska punk band

- Slow Gherkin in 2004

Background information
- Origin: Santa Cruz, California, United States
- Genres: Third Wave Ska; Ska punk Alternative rock
- Years active: 1993–2002; 2016-present
- Label: Asian Man Records
- Members: A.J. Marquez; Zach "ZK" Kent; Phil Boutelle; James Rickman; Brigham Housman; Josh "Monty" Montgomery "Polka" Peter Cowan; Rob Pratt; Matt Porter; Zack "Ollie" Olsen; Achilles Poloynis; Ross Peard; Brendan Thompson
- Website: http://www.slowgherkin.com

Slow Gherkin is an American ska punk band from Santa Cruz, California, United States.

== History ==
=== Formation and initial run ===
Slow Gherkin was formed in 1993 by teenagers AJ Marquez, Zack "ZK" Kent, Phil Boutelle, and James Rickman.

They released their first album, Double Happiness, which was distributed by Asian Man Records, in 1996.

They released their second album, Shed Some Skin, in 1998.

In 2002, the band released Run Screaming, their final album. and played their last show that same year.

=== Reunion shows and UK tour ===
Slow Gherkin reunited to play a concert at Santa Cruz's Rio Theater on June 18, 2011. This was followed by a second reunion show in New York City in 2014. and in 2016, the band reunited again to play at the Asian Man Records 20 year anniversary show and released two new singles on "Lives".

In 2018, the band played a few shows in California as well..

On August 29, 2025 the band reunited once again playing a show in their hometown of Santa Cruz. The following month in September 2025, the band played the Supernova Ska Festival in Hampton, VA.

In November 2025 it was announced that Slow Gherkin will travel to the United Kingdom to play Manchester Punk Festival in April 2026, followed by a five-date UK tour with Lightyear to support the "Lightyear & Slow Gherkin" 4-track split CD.

== Discography ==
- Death of a Salesman (1994) (7" vinyl)
- Double Happiness (1997) (CD and 12" vinyl)
- Shed Some Skin (1998) (CD and 12" vinyl)
- Another in Your Life (1998) (7" vinyl)
- Invisible Tank Slow Gherkin/Jeffries Fan Club split (1998) (CD)
- Slow Gherkin/RX Bandits split (1999) (CD)
- Roman Holiday (2000) (CD)
- Run Screaming (2002) (CD)
- Hatchet Job Slow Gherkin/Caezer Soze split (2004) (CD)
- Death of a Ska Band: Rarities 1994–2002 (2011) (CD)
- Lightyear & Slow Gherkin (2026) (CD, Digital)

== Current/other projects ==
In 2007, Rickman started The Stitch Up, with MU330 front man Dan Potthast. He plays the bass and adds backup vocals.

Matt Porter and A.J. Marquez are currently in a group The Huxtables. A.J. Marquez, Matt Porter, Phil Boutelle all play in Dan P and the Bricks as well.

Zack Olsen is a drummer, drum technician and educator based out of Santa Cruz. Olsen plays drums in several bands with genres spanning from jazz, rock, funk and reggae based in the Santa Cruz area. As a technician, he is the head drum technician of Kuumbwa Jazz Center in Santa Cruz as well as the annual Monterey Jazz Festival in Monterey, California, working with numerous musicians every year. As an educator, he runs a studio in Soquel offering private lessons as well as teaching in education programs around the Santa Cruz Area.
