= Headbutt (song) =

Single by The King Blues

from the album Punk and Poetry
- Released: 16 May 2010
- Genre: Punk rock, Alternative rock
- Length: 3:22 (album version)
- Label: Transmission Recordings
- Songwriter(s): Jonny 'Itch' Fox, Peter Miles, Michael 'Fruitbag' Payne

The King Blues singles chronology
"I Got Love" (2009)	"Headbutt" (2010)	"Holiday" (2010)

"Headbutt" is the first single from The King Blues' third album Punk and Poetry. It was released on iTunes on 16 May 2010. The band appeared in Kerrang! magazine shortly before its release to promote the single. The single is the first since founding member of the band 'Fruitbag' left and the first released on new label Transmission Recordings. Already the song has become a hit with fans due to the band playing it live frequently during their tour during March, April and May 2010. It reached #72 in the Official UK top 100 singles chart, #1 in the Independent Singles Breaker Chart, and #6 on the Independent Singles Chart.

== Track listing ==
CD/iTunes download
No.	Title	Writer(s)	Length
1.	"Headbutt" (album version)	Jonny 'Itch' Fox	3:22
2.	"Sore Throat"	Fox	2:57
3.	"Headbutt" (RUX remix)	Fox	4:09
4.	"Headbutt" (Dr.Meaker remix)	Fox	5:37

== Credits and personnel ==
- Writer – Jonny 'Itch' Fox, Peter Miles, Michael 'Fruitbag' Payne
- Mixer – Steve Fitzmaurice
