= Civil Disobedients =

Studio album by Capdown
- Released: 22 May 2000
- Recorded: February–March 2000
- Studio: The Lodge Studios, Northampton
- Length: 45:49
- Label: Household Name
- Producer: Jeroen Melchers

Capdown chronology
Civil Disobedients (2000)	Pound for the Sound (2001)

Professional ratings
Review scores
Source	Rating
Punktastic	4/5 stars
Soundscape	8/10

Civil Disobedients is the debut album by UK ska-core band Capdown, released on 22 May 2000, through Household Name Records.

It was included in NME magazine's Top 100 Greatest Albums of the Decade list.

== Track listing ==
Civil Disobedients
No.	Title	Length
1.	"Unite To Progress"	2:06
2.	"Kained But Able"	4:00
3.	"Ska Wars"	4:11
4.	"Jnr NBC"	2:26
5.	"Dub No. 1" (featuring The Dutch Master)	3:38
6.	"Positivity"	3:30
7.	"Cousin Cleotis"	3:27
8.	"The Neverlution"	4:05
9.	"Civil Disobedients"	5:20
10.	"Headstrong"	5:06
11.	"Deal Real"	2:53
12.	"Bitches And Nike Shoes"	5:08
Total length:		45:49

== Personnel ==
Credits adapted from liner notes.

- Jake Sims-Fielding – vocals, saxophone
- Keith Minter – guitar, vocals
- Kus (a.k.a. Cousin Cleotis) – keyboards
- Robin "Boob" Goold – bass guitar
- Tim Macdonald – drums

== Release history ==
Country	Date	Label	Format	Catalogue number
United Kingdom	22 May 2000	Household Name Records	CD	HAUS032
United Kingdom	2000	Peter Bower Records	Vinyl	PBR 006
