= Wind Up Toys (album) =

Studio album by Capdown
- Released: 5 February 2007
- Studios: Kore Studios, London; West Street Studios, Buckingham
- Length: 39:11
- Label: Fierce Panda
- Producer: Larry Hibbitt

Capdown chronology
Pound for the Sound (2001)	Wind Up Toys (2007)	Live EP (2007)

Professional ratings
Review scores
Source	Rating
AllMusic	3/5 stars
Kerrang!	4/5 stars
TheMusicZine	4.5/5 stars
NME	4/10
Punktastic	4/5 stars
Rocklouder	4/5 stars
Ox-Fanzine	4/10

Wind Up Toys is the third and final studio album from UK punk band Capdown released on 5 February 2007. It is also the first and only Capdown album to be released on the Fierce Panda Records label. Anyone who pre-ordered the album from Banquet Records in Kingston, UK would get signed copies of the album as well as a free three live track EP, consisting of "Keeping Up Appearances", "Surviving The Death Of A Genre" and "No Matter What".

== Track listing ==
All songs written by Goold, Macdonald, Minter, Sims-Fielding.

Wind Up Toys
No.	Title	Length
1.	"Truly Dead"	2:39
2.	"Blood, Sweat & Fears"	3:06
3.	"Wind Up Toys"	4:04
4.	"Terms And Conditions Apply"	3:35
5.	"Surviving The Death Of A Genre"	3:57
6.	"No Matter What"	4:21
7.	"Thrash Tuesday"	1:15
8.	"Generation Next"	2:50
9.	"Keeping Up Appearances"	3:18
10.	"Strictly Business"	2:22
11.	"Community Service"	3:09
12.	"Home Is Where The Start Is"	4:35
Total length:		39:11

Released on 25 April 2007 by Imperial Records as part of the album package in Japan.

Live Rehearsal EP (Japan exclusive)
No.	Title	Length
13.	"Keeping Up Appearances" (demo)	3:22
14.	"Wind Up Toys" (demo)	3:34
15.	"(Segue)"	1:26
16.	"Surviving The Death Of A Genre" (demo)	3:30

== Personnel ==
Credits adapted from liner notes.

Capdown

- Andrew Hunt – keyboards
- Jacob Sims-Fielding – vocals, saxophone
- Keith Minter – guitars, backing vocals
- Robin B. Goold – bass guitar
- Tim Macdonald – drums

Production

- Larry Hibbitt – production, mixing and engineering
- George Apsion – assistance
- Tarik Zaid Al-Naswari – assistance
- Charlie Dorman – additional mix assistance
