= Save the World. Get the Girl =

Save the World · Get the Girl

Studio album by The King Blues
- Released: 20 October 2008
- Recorded: 2008
- Genre: Punk rock; indie rock; folk punk
- Length: 45:44
- Label: Field Recordings, Island Records
- Producer: Peter Miles, Clive Langer

The King Blues chronology
Under the Fog (2006)	Save the World · Get the Girl (2008)	Punk and Poetry (2011)

Save the World · Get the Girl is the second album by The King Blues. It was released on 20 October 2008. The title is taken from the Clash song "Red Angel Dragnet" from their album Combat Rock.

Four singles were released from the album: "My Boulder", "Let's Hang the Landlord", "Save the World · Get the Girl", and "I Got Love". "I Got Love" reached #96 in the UK Singles Chart.

The album has been received very well by fans and critics. The band hoped to make the top 75 on the albums chart starting 27 October; however, the album did not do so, peaking at #113.

== Track listing ==
No.	Title	Writer(s)	Length
1.	"My Boulder"	Jonny "Itch" Fox	3:22
2.	"I Got Love"	Jonny "Itch" Fox	3:11
3.	"The Schemers, the Scroungers & the Rats"	Jonny "Itch" Fox	3:40
4.	"Underneath This Lamppost Light"	Jonny "Itch" Fox	4:54
5.	"Save the World, Get the Girl"	Jonny "Itch" Fox, Jamie Jazz	3:06
6.	"For You My Darling"	Jonny "Itch" Fox	5:11
7.	"The Streets Are Ours"	Jonny "Itch" Fox, Jamie Jazz, Allan Gunby, Jim Parmley & Fruitbag	3:35
8.	"Let's Hang the Landlord"	Jonny "Itch" Fox	5:13
9.	"Out of Luck""	Jonny "Itch" Fox	3:20
10.	"Hold on Tight"	Jonny "Itch" Fox	3:38
11.	"What If Punk Never Happened"	Jonny "Itch" Fox & Peter Miles	6:40
Total length:			45:44

== Personnel ==
- Jonny "Itch" Fox – Lead Vocals, Ukulele
- Jamie Jazz – Guitar, Baritone Ukulele
- Mike 'Fruitbag' Payne – Piano, Guitar, Hammond, Organ, Electric Sitar, Harmonica, Percussion
- Allen Gunby – Drums
- Jonny Rich – Bass
- Jim Parmley – Conga, Timbale
- Peter Miles – Tambourine, Bass, Banjo, Piano, Percussion, Harmonium, Guitar
- Louie Vause – Accordion
- Denmark Street Punk Rock Choir – Group Vocals
- London Folk Punk Mob – Group Vocals
- Homestead Choir – Group Vocals
- Kat Marsh – Vocals
- Peter Young – Drums
- Jim Parmley – Percussion
- Attila the Stockbroker – Fiddle
- All songs written and performed by The King Blues.
- Produced, recorded and mixed by Peter Miles.
- Track 2, 3, 6, 7 and 8 produced by Clive Langer
- 'Underneath This Lamppost Light' produced and mixed by Andreas S. Jensen
