= Adequate Seven =

Welsh band

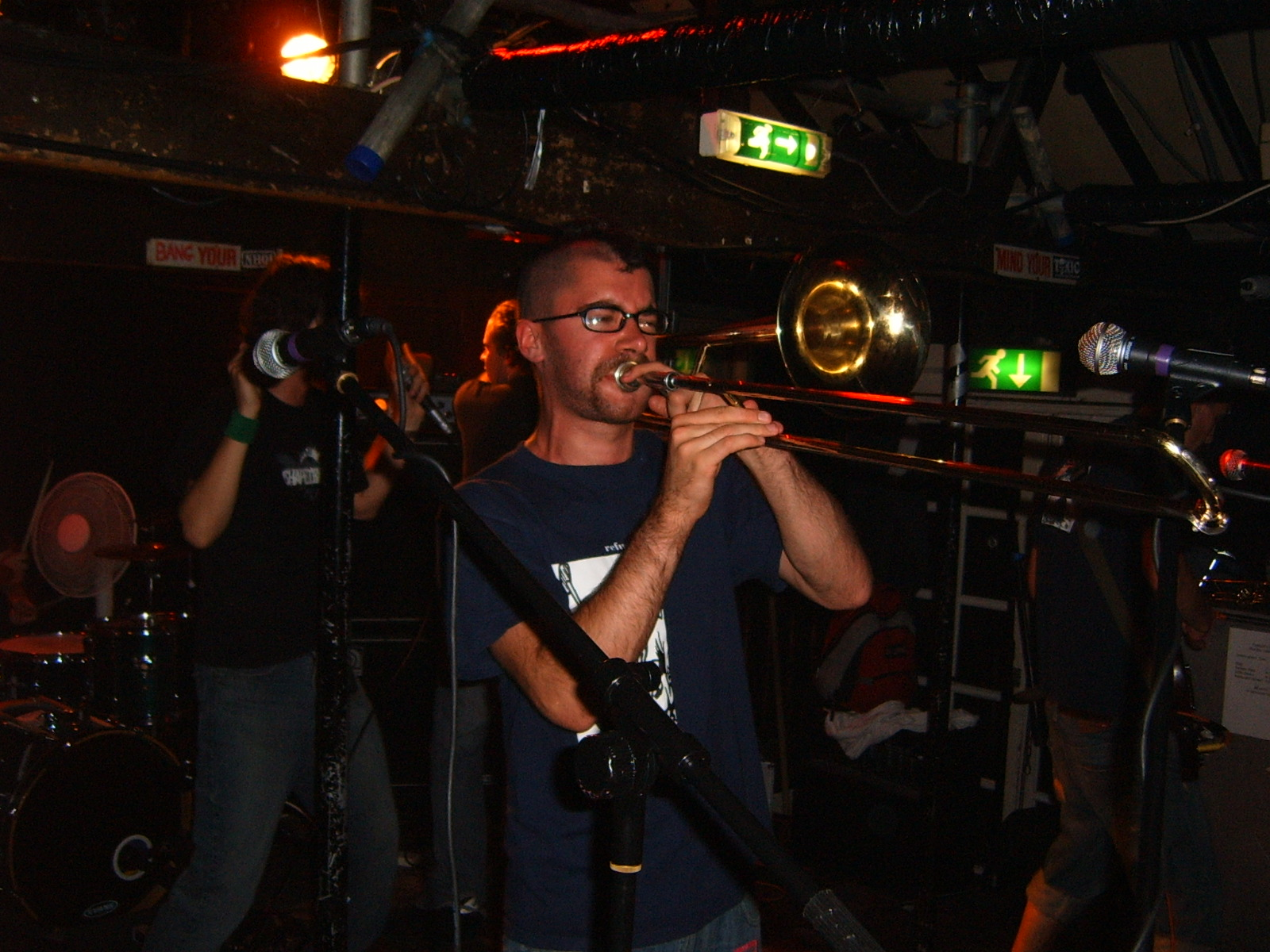
- Tom Pinder of Adequate Seven

Background information
- Origin: Cardiff, Wales
- Genres: Jazz rock, rapcore
- Years active: 2000–2006
- Labels: Breaking World Records, Household Name Records
- Past members: Jamie Searle; Pete Barnes; Kazz Basma; Gavin Fitzjohn; Tom Pinder; WD Davies; Ben Reynolds; Jonny Prosser; Matt Price

Adequate Seven were a Welsh band who blended music styles such as hip hop, hardcore, punk, and funk. They formed in 2000 and split in December 2006.

== History ==
Adequate Seven formed in November 2000 and played their first gig only four weeks later. The band drew upon a diverse selection of influences in creating their sound. In February 2001 the band released the Adequate Seven EP, a 5-track EP on their own label Breaking World Records.

The band was brought to the attention of London-based label Household Name Records who featured one of the band's tracks on their 2002 label sampler. The label the released Adequate Seven's debut full-length Songs of Innocence and of Experience in March 2003 to critical acclaim.

Adequate Seven embarked on several tours, across the UK as well as mainland Europe, with bands such as Hundred Reasons, Capdown, The Suicide Machines and Fishbone as well as opening up for the likes of Cypress Hill and The Slackers.

In the middle of 2004, Matt (Squeak) Price and Jonny Prosser left the band to pursue other musical directions. Gavin Fitzjohn and WD Davies were recruited by the band as replacements.

=== Move to Audio Rehab ===
Adequate Seven left Household Name Records early in 2005, instead choosing to release their debut single "Splitting Up" on Audio Rehab - a predominantly drum & bass label. According to vocalist Jamie Searle, the move was "totally friendly. We still get on with [Household Name], we're totally supportive of what they do, they still support our band and what we do."

Trombonist Tom Pinder added: "...we felt with this next album that it was time to take some big risks for the sake for the band's continuing progress, and perhaps even for its survival. We were recording an album in late last year that we had decided to release through Household Name, but we knew exactly what would happen if we released the record with them. We'd have sold a few thousand copies over the next couple of years and we'd be able to keep touring the same circuit and perhaps break into Europe a bit more but we'd still not really have an income from the band or any real prospect of one, and therefore because of various pressures on some of us individually we'd be struggling to continue to commit ourselves fully to the band. We decided that we needed a label that could get us out there and pay for us to spend the time and money necessary to make good records. Whilst Household Name is an excellent independent label, they don't work on a scale that could accommodate those extra things."

Searle was also sure to make the point that Adequate Seven would not suffer artistically from their move to the new label: "...we're not about to start working with machines any time soon. We're doing exactly what we did before, which was get into the practice room, write some tunes, have a bit of a dance."

The band released the "Splitting Up" single on 12 inch vinyl and CD in August 2005. The track caused interest on BBC Radio 1's evening shows, including being crowned Zane Lowe's "Hottest Record in the World".

=== Here on Earth ===
On 12 June 2006, prior to the release of their second album, Adequate Seven released the double A-side single "Head Up High" / "Gotta Stay Focused" on their own label Breaking World Records. The album, Here on Earth, was released on 19 June 2006. Adequate Seven also played Compass Point Festival in Cardiff and appeared on the BBC Radio 1 Lock Up stage at the 2006 Reading Festival (Carling Weekend).

=== Split ===
After rumours began circulating on the Internet about the band splitting up, Adequate Seven posted a statement confirming the rumours:

"After nearly six years, and nearly 600 gigs, we've come to the decision that it's the right time to call it a day."

The band released a final single, a free download of Set Your Sights and went on one final tour. The band recorded their final London gig, at the Underworld venue, which was released as a live album on Gravity DIP Records. It was entitled "Last Night in London" in December 2006.

Adequate Seven played their final farewell gig on 10 December 2006 to a sold-out crowd at Cardiff Student's Union. Boom in the Diamond Industry, Captain Everything, Shootin' Goon, Get Cape Wear Cape Fly and Capdown all supported. Original members Jonny Prosser and Matt Price performed with the band during their set.

=== Post disbanding ===
Many members of the band have gone on to have further success in the music industry after the demise of Adequate Seven. Gavin Fitzjohn joined Get Cape. Wear Cape. Fly in early 2007 and toured and recorded with the band for 18 months before leaving to join Paolo Nutini’s band, with whom he still plays. Tom Pinder has also played with Get Cape Wear Cape Fly since early 2008, and also plays alongside Fitzjohn with Paolo Nutini's band, including numerous TV appearances.

Will Davies has had success with the Cardiff-based rock quartet Attack! Attack! who are touring the UK and Europe extensively to support the release of their first album. The band are also featured on the latest addition of Activisions Guitar Hero 5 as well as having had their single "You and Me" included in an episode of Beverly Hills 90210.

Fitzjohn, Pinder and Davies also play in the ska band Capital City Ska alongside Adequate Seven's former manager Matt Redd, which has also occasionally featured Pete Barnes on guitar.

Fitzjohn also plays with The Barry Horns and has played horns for Super Furry Animals, Manic Street Preachers and Imelda May. He been a touring member of the Stereophonics since 2018, and appears on various recordings. He also appeared in the 2018 Ghost album Prequelle.

Jamie Searle played with London-based hardcore band March of the Raptors with members of Fireapple Red from 2010 - 2013.

== Legacy ==
By the time Adequate Seven split up in 2006, they had played nearly 600 gigs all over Europe and had recorded 6 BBC sessions, 2 albums and an EP. The band left a unique musical legacy which has continued to influence bands around the world. Drowned in Sound featured Adequate Seven in an article about UK bands that were pushing the boundaries of punk rock in the 2000s. In 2009, Here On Earth was named by Music News as one of ten albums that define the 21st Century. Songs Of Innocence And Experience was featured in a greatest unheard albums list in the NME in February 2012.

== Discography ==
=== Albums/EPs/DVDs ===
Year	Title	Format	Label	Notes
2001	Adequate 7 EP	EP	Breaking World Records	Recorded with original bassist Jonny Prosser and original trumpet player Matt Price (the artist formerly known as Squeak)
2003	Songs of Innocence and of Experience	Album	Household Name Records	Recorded with original bassist Jonny Prosser and original trumpet player Matt Price. Price also played keyboards on the album.
2006	Here on Earth	Album	Breaking World Records	
2006	Last Night in London (live album)	Album	Gravity DIP Records	
Cancelled	split with Sonic Boom Six	DVD	Punkervision	Planned but cancelled when the band split.

=== Singles ===
Year	Title	Label
2005	"Splitting Up"	Audio Rehab Records
2006	"Gotta Stay Focused/Head Up High"	Breaking World Records
2006	"Set Your Sights"	
