= Antimaniax =

Austrian skacore band

Antimaniax is a four-piece skacore band from Austria, known for its lyrically anti-authoritarian stance. The band was formed in 1998.

== History ==
Though they released a demo recording, We're Tryin'... in 2000, their first official release came in the form of a mini album, As Long As People Think on Household Name Records in 2002. That year they performed over 100 shows including three tours throughout the UK and a tour of Eastern Europe.

In 2003 they released a second mini album - I'm Without Sleep... In This Desert of Concrete - on Household Name Records, supporting that release by touring Europe. They also conducted a 5 week tour with US ska-core band Leftöver Crack that year.

The band also support animal rights campaigns and in 2004 donated "I can smell freedom" to a benefit CD for the Southern Animal Rights Coalition, "Until Every Cage Is Empty". On their debut album, the song "Chili Con Tofu", a vegan food recipe, questions the ideology that animals feel people don't think, which will continue so long as people think that animals are incapable of suffering. Kelly Kemp from No Comply said she had been influenced by the band whose members are nearly all vegan, and chose to change her diet after talking to them.

The record label Household Name lists the band as having lasted until 2005. In early 2006 they announced that Dani, their bassist, had left the band and that they are currently seeking a new bassist. This has halted production of their forthcoming album.

== Past members ==
- Georg, vocals
- Thom, guitar/vocals
- Candee, drums
- Daniel - bass guitar
- Chris - bass guitar

== Discography ==
- We're Tryin'... (self-released, 2000)
- As Long As People Think (Household Name Records, 2002)
- I'm Without Sleep... In This Desert of Concrete (Household Name Records, 2004)

== Other releases ==
- "War Story" cover on a Choking Victim tribute album.

== See also ==
- Household Name Records
