= The King Blues =

British punk rock band

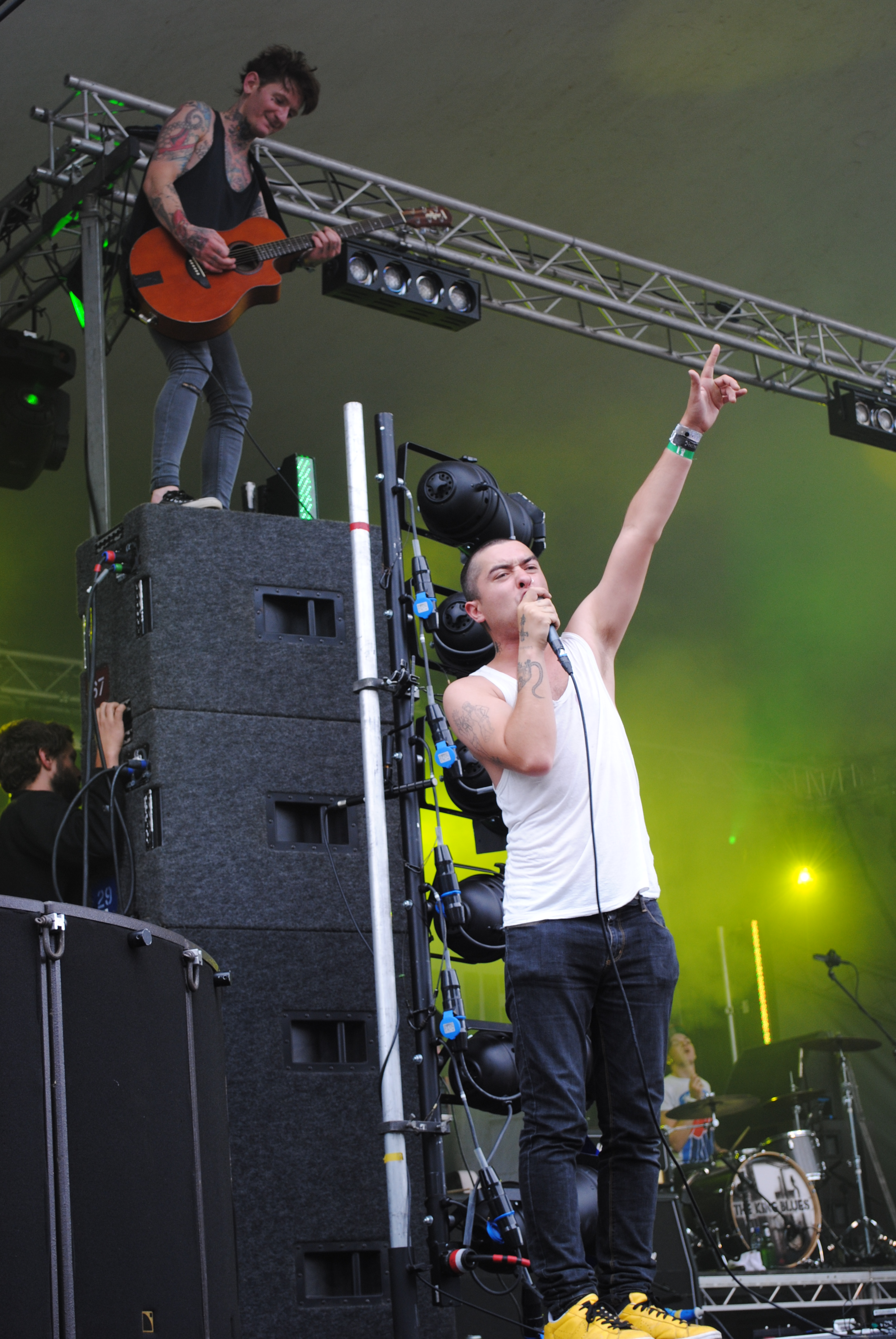
- King Blues at Kendal Calling 2010

Background information
- Origin: London, England
- Genres: Folk punk; punk rock; ska punk
- Years active: 2004–2012; 2015–present
- Labels: currently: Meatball / Speech Development (formerly: Transmission Recordings, Island, Field Recordings, Household Name)
- Members: Jonny "Itch" Fox; Andrew Mckenzie; Marianne Canning; Tom Loffman; Angus Mcburger
- Past members: Jamie Jazz; Peter Jolliffe Thomas; Louis Bennett; Jack Usher; Dean Ashton; Kat Marsh; Josie Dobson; Robin Guy; Chris Goodman; George Lindsay; Perkie; Ade Preston; Charlie Wilson; Jim Parmley; Johnny Rich; Al Gunby

The King Blues are a British punk rock band from London credited for fusing punk and hip hop together with influences from ska and spoken word. Tariq Ali described the band's sounds as "rough, radical music that should unsettle the rulers of this country. A new generation of musicians are challenging war-monger politicians and their courtiers". Influences include Public Enemy, The Clash and The Specials. Lead singer Jonny "Itch" Fox describes the band's sound as 'rebel street music.'

== History ==
The King Blues began as a solo project of Jonny "Itch" Fox on vocals and ukulele, the first The King Blues EP All Fall Down was recorded solo by itch who also played the music on it. The band later expanded to include two acoustic guitarists and a bassist, before again expanding to include two full-time percussion members. Their sound was initially described as "soulful ska with raw folk and a punk rock attitude". or "conscious rude boy ska"

In 2004, they self-released a demo EP titled All Fall Down featuring five tracks. The cover and CD body art was a stencil of a fuse bomb and the band's logo; each one was hand sprayed by itch.

On 25 November 2015 The King Blues announced they had reformed on their official Facebook page, with the words "Guess who's back and pissed off again".

=== Under the Fog (2006–07) ===
In June 2006 their debut album, Under the Fog, was released on Household Name Records, and coincided with increased gigging. Recorded in the band's flat in Hackney in 5 days, the record became an underground phenomenon. In November of the same year, "Mr Music Man" was released as a CD single, also on Household Name. The single was enhanced with a video chronicling the band's attempt to play more gigs in a 24-hour period than Status Quo's record-breaking four gigs in one day. The King Blues managed seven. Their single "Mr Music Man" was voted Best Punk Song of 2006 by BBC Radio 1.

A 12-inch vinyl version of Under The Fog was released on Tartan Records Tartanrex in 2007. Limited to 1000 copies with the added bonus track of "If Genghis Khan, then Why Can't I", the record was pressed on durable 180g vinyl and hand-printed.

In 2007, the band was signed to Field Recordings, a label co-owned by Rollo Armstrong and backed by Island Records. Under the Fog was partly re-recorded and re-issued in March 2008, and was preceded by two singles, "Come Fi Di Youth" and a new version of "Mr. Music Man".

In 2007, Jonny "Itch" Fox provided additional vocals for Faithless on their album To All New Arrivals and And Now We're Even's first single "Youmii, Hawaii".

==== Taking Over (2007) ====
In 2007, the band released an EP which featured four tracks including an updated version of Taking Over from their first album Under The Fog.

=== Save the World, Get the Girl (2008) ===
In May 2008, the band released a single from their forthcoming second album called "Let's Hang the Landlord" to those signed up to their email list. The lyric is autobiographical, detailing Itch's life as a homeless teenage punk. The track was also released on a split 7-inch single, alongside "Mayday", the debut UK single by Flobots.

Save the World. Get the Girl was released on 20 October 2008 in the UK. The album was produced by Peter Miles, who produced Under the Fog, and Clive Langer (producer of Elvis Costello, Madness, Dexy's Midnight Runners, Morrissey). The album received positive reviews.

"My Boulder" was released as a single on 13 October 2008 in the UK. Zane Lowe played this track several times on BBC Radio 1 and recommended it on air to Noel Gallagher. "My Boulder" includes an excerpt from a reading of the poem The Pied Piper of Hamelin by Robert Browning. Other tracks from the album, including What If Punk Never Happened, received airplay on Radio 1, from Rob da Bank, Mike Davies, and Zane Lowe, and on the Xfm punk show (X Punk) hosted by Pete Donaldson and Phil Clifton. The band have also received considerable airplay in Australia courtesy of Triple R's punk program Bullying the Jukebox.

"I Got Love" was released on 4 May 2009 as the final single from the album; its first air-time was on BBC Radio 1. The band also performed a cover of Dizzee Rascal's "Bonkers" on Radio 1's Live Lounge in June 2009.

The band used their poster budget to hire an empty billboard in the middle of London's financial district and spray painted an open letter to the then Prime Minister Gordon Brown

=== Post Save the World, Get the Girl / new line-up (2009–10) ===
Over late 2009 and early 2010, The King Blues continued to tour their second album, adding songs such as "Headbutt", "Sore Throat" and "Five Bottles of Shampoo" to their setlist.

In mid 2010, The King Blues were dropped from Field Recordings. This coincided with the departure of band members Fruitbag, and session players Johnny Rich, Al Gunby and Jim Parmley. A controversial message explaining the departures was posted on the Punktastic forum by Fruitbag with a reply written by itch. However, the band quickly found a new record label, Transmission Recordings, and new members. Only a few weeks later, the new King Blues line-up went on tour supporting Enter Shikari.

On 23 March, Zane Lowe aired "Headbutt" as his "hottest record in the world" on his Radio 1 show, and Itch stated on the show that the band had completely finished recording five or six new songs. On their UK tour it was announced that "Headbutt" would be released on 16 May 2010 and that Rou Reynolds of Enter Shikari had remixed the track for free download.

The King Blues departed on their "London Brawling tour" (10 April until 5 May) along with four different support bands: Mouthwash (all gigs), Moral Dilemma, The Meow Meows and Dirty Revolution. Most nights of the tour the band invited a speaker on stage, including Sophie Lancaster's mother speaking for the S.O.P.H.I.E. foundation. (The King Blues had S.O.P.H.I.E. bands available on this tour.) The band also played gigs for Love Music Hate Racism. On 8 August 2010 they played at the Hevy Music Festival near Folkestone. During this time, the band showcased songs planned for the forthcoming album Punk & Poetry. However, much of this material, such as "Kissing Frogs" and "We Will Never Grow Old" was shelved due to the band finding inspiration from the UK's anti-cuts protests and riots, and the Arab Spring, which led to them writing new material such as "I Want You", "We Are Fucking Angry" and "Set The World On Fire".

On 29 August, The King Blues released their single "Holiday" along with "I Got Hate" and an acoustic version of the previous single "Headbutt" as B-sides. On the same day, the King Blues played the main stage at Reading Festival.

The King Blues took their "Lil Bast*rd" soundsystem to one of Tony Blair's speeches and drowned out the sound in the building.

=== Punk and Poetry (2011) ===
On 21 January 2011, The King Blues posted a 40-second preview of a song, "We Are Fucking Angry". It received radio play on Mike Davies' Radio 1 Punk Show and a few days later the band posted a free download link to the song on the internet.

Set The World On Fire debuted on Mike Davies' Punk Show on 7 February, receiving more plays on the same show and Zane Lowe's show over the next few weeks. On 26 February, the official music video for the song was posted online. It was released on 10 April on digital download with a Dr Meaker remix version of the song as the b-side. On 1 March, Itch co-hosted Mike Davies' Radio 1 Punk Show, previewing songs "The Future's Not What It Used to Be" and "Five Bottles of Shampoo". On 5 March, the track listing for Punk and Poetry was announced, and the album was released on 18 April to further positive reviews. It reached the Top 40 of the UK Album Chart, just missing the Top 30.

On 12 February 2012, the fourth single from the current album, Does Anybody Care About Us? was released as a digital download, backed with a live recording of Five Bottles of Shampoo.

=== Long Live the Struggle (2012) ===
At the 2011 Leeds Festival, The King Blues announced the commencement of work on the follow-up album to Punk & Poetry, and debuted the song "Power to the People", which was also played on their subsequent debut European tour. At The Roundhouse in November 2011 they debuted another song, "Modern Life Has Let Me Down".

The band recorded Long Live The Struggle in LA with producer John Feldman after he flew to UK to watch the band perform and fell in love with their uniquely British style and lyrics.

The song "Can't Bring Me Down" features Jason Butler of Letlive.

On 6 March 2012, Itch again co-hosted Mike Davies' Radio 1 Punk Show, previewing the song "Tear Us Apart".

=== Off with Their Heads (2016) ===
On 27 February 2016 The King Blues released their comeback record Off with Their Heads on their own Meatball Records with the physical released on Speech Development Records. The title track video, directed by Scroobius Pip, received over a quarter of a million views on the first day. The artwork by Oh Bones depicts a severed head of state in the hands of singer Itch. Facebook banned the video from being advertised and Apple banned the release from iTunes for the first week of sales.

=== The Gospel Truth (2017) ===
On 11 April 2017, The King Blues released their fifth studio album The Gospel Truth on Cooking Vinyl Records. Their first album since 2012, it attained a number 1 spot on the cassette chart, a top 20 placing on the vinyl chart and a top 40 placing on the overall chart.

=== "Tory Is a 4 Letter Word" (2017) ===
A single, "Tory Is a 4 Letter Word", was released as a download on Cooking Vinyl Records around the time of the UK general election.

=== "38 Minutes" (2019) ===
A soundtrack by The King Blues to a punk puppet opera written by Jonny Itch Fox. It is based on the false alarm that went out in Hawaii in 2018, informing residents there was an imminent missile and took 38 minutes before they were told it was a false alarm. The musical theatre production has one date in Camden, London and sold out months in advance. The album entered the UK Top 40. It is the first album put out on Jonny Itch Fox's "Meatball Records"

=== A Monkey Could Do That (2026) ===
On 24 July 2026 The King Blues released their eighth studio album A Monkey Could Do That on Meatball Records/23rd Precinct Music Masters. The album had a unique build up to release whereby rather than singles there were multiple EPs released, each containing four songs off of the album; "You'll Never Make A Monkey Out Of Me", "1000 Monkeys, 1000 Typewriters", "Ape Shall Never Kill Ape", "Well I'll Be A Monkey's Uncle", and "I Guess You Finally Made A Monkey Out Of Me". To add to this, The King Blues released music videos for each track off of the respective EP, with lead singer Itch also releasing acoustic versions of each song on his Instagram.

== Politics ==
The King Blues have "a commitment to politics and resistance". Itch has written for Last Hours magazine which generally focuses on resistance politics and protest. Several songs on Under the Fog are overtly political, including "Chimp in a 3 Piece Suit" and "Duck and Cover". The band's website states that Save the World, Get the Girl features "a much more personalized take on social ills" than Under the Fog. Nonetheless, overtly political lyrics did feature in two live favourites that appeared on the album. The title track includes the lyric "Going to war to prevent war was the most stupid thing I ever heard", while The Streets Are Ours includes references to Indymedia and Tiananmen Square. "Smash EDO Dub", the B side to the re-release of "Mr. Music Man", features an interview with a campaigner from the Smash EDO movement. The links on The King Blues' official website are almost exclusively political. On his Formspring profile, Itch states that he is probably an anarchist.

Promoting their latest single in February 2012, Itch made the following statement: "There's no fucking future for anyone but the privileged any more, education needs to be for everyone, we need jobs, houses, and all they want us to do is pay our taxes, shut the fuck up and gratefully eat X-Factor. It makes me sick to my gut. Banker bonuses and politicians claiming thousands for their fucking duck ponds while they sweep the homeless off the streets and hose down where they're sleeping, taking away benefits while two and a half million people are unemployed, leaving empty houses to rot and trying to outlaw squatting during a homeless crisis. There's a battle going on and we're part of it whether we like it or not. Cameron says, 'in this together', easy to say if you're sitting on £30,000,000! He has no idea what life is like for the people he condemns, for the people he makes it most difficult for. He's a fucking scumbag and I've had enough of it, I know I ain't the only one either. I look around and I see resistance on every level. Call us what you like, striking workers, protesting students, rioting kids, the 99%, we are who we are, a product of a broken Britain being torn apart and yes, we are fucking angry – is anybody gonna fight back?"

On their 2016 tour, the band had a food drive at each show collecting tinned food for local soup kitchens.

== Breakup and reformations ==
On 3 April 2012, Itch announced officially the break-up of the band. He released this official statement:

It is with great sadness and very heavy hearts that we must inform you, that as of today The King Blues are no more. We are all immensely proud of our body of work. We will be releasing the last The King Blues album entitled 'Long Live The Struggle' as the final chapter. The album will be released in early July 2012. We simply feel we have taken things as far as they can go and it would be unfair on you if we were to go through the motions like so many other artists do. We all believe strongly in what The King Blues stands for.

The break-up followed allegations of manipulation and dishonesty by Itch towards the other members of the band.

Jonny "Itch" Fox confirmed that he was starting a solo project and would release music under the name "Itch". His first EP, "Manifesto Pt. 1: How to Fucking Rule at Life" was released online on 26 November 2012. He followed up with a mixtape produced by Dan The Automator and featuring Kid Koala titled "Dan The Automator presents iTCH- The First Course" which was recorded at Dan's studio in San Francisco

Itch's album The Deep End was produced by John Feldmann and released on Red Bull Records. It included guest appearances from Taking Back Sunday, Matisyahu, Less Than Jake and Rancid. Lead single "Another Man" reached platinum sales in Australia and stayed in the top 40 for 5 months.

Jamie Jazz started a project with guitarist Paul Mullen (Yourcodenameis:milo, The Automatic), Bleach Blood. Bleach Blood signed with The King Blues previous record label Transmission Recordings and released their first record, a 4-track EP The Young Heartbreaker's Club in 2012 and a full-length album entitled All The Sides of a Circle in 2013 before breaking up.

On 6 May 2014, Itch, Jamie Jazz and Fruitbag briefly reunited for a three-song one-off encore after Itch's set at the 100 Club in London.

On 25 November 2015, The King Blues announced their return with a post on their Facebook page linking to a news article from Kerrang! with the accompanying message of "Guess who's back and pissed off again". On 12 February 2016, they released the EP Off With Their Heads along with a music video.

The King Blues were support for Enter Shikari on their February 2016 Mindsweep Tour which culminated at a sold-out show in London's Alexandra Palace.

The King Blues have toured in support of The Gospel Truth. Their reformation tours have been sold out and included doing "food drives" for local homeless charities Itch has given little press interviews

In 2019, The King Blues released "38 Minutes" – a punk rock puppet opera written by Jonny Itch Fox. It is to be performed in a Camden venue in August 2019, it sold out months in advance. The musical theatre piece is based on a false alarm that went out in Hawaii in 2018 informing residents of an imminent missile. It took 38 minutes for a second alert stating it was a false alarm to go out. The soundtrack is the first release of Jonny Itch Fox's Meatball Records. The soundtrack entered the UK top 40.

== Band members ==
- Jonny "Itch" Fox – vocals, ukulele
- Tom Loffman – guitar
- Angus Mcburger - bass
- Andy Mckenzie – drums
- Marianne Canning- violin

=== Former members ===
- Jack Emmings
- Mike Moore
- Peter Jolliffe Thomas
- Jamie Jazz – guitar, vocals
- Fruitbag – guitar, vocals, keyboards
- Jack Usher – drums, percussion, backing vocals
- Kat Marsh – bass, backing vocals
- Josie Dobson – keyboards, vocals
- Ade Preston – guitar, backing Vocals
- Louis Bennett - Frontman, vocals

=== Session members ===
- Johnny Rich – bass
- Al Gunby – drums
- Jim Parmley – percussion
- Chris Goodman – bass
- George Lindsay – drums
- Perkie – keyboards, vocals
- Charlie Wilson – guitar

== Discography ==
=== Albums ===
Year	Album	Label
2006	Under the Fog	Household Name Records
2008	Under the Fog (Reissue)	Field Recordings/Island
2008	Save the World. Get the Girl	Field Recordings/Island
2010	Punk & Poetry	Transmission Recordings
2012	Long Live the Struggle	Transmission Recordings
2016	Off With Their Heads	Speech Development
2017	The Gospel Truth	Cooking Vinyl
2019	38 Minutes	Meatball Records
2026	A Monkey Could Do That	Meatball Records/23rd Precinct Music Masters
