= Skylar (album) =

Single album by Skylar
- Released: April 2006
- Recorded: September 2004
- Genre: Reggae, Ska
- Length: 43:56
- Label: Do The Dog Music dogcd23
- Producer: Peter Miles

Skylar is the debut full-length album recorded by the band Skylar.

The album was released by Do The Dog Music in April 2006, but was first made available both directly from the band members whilst on their 2005 summer tour in Howards Alias and online via their website.

The release featured two additional acoustic tracks and new cover art courtesy of threedesign of Cambridge.

== Track listing ==
1. "Eyes Don't Lie"
2. "Howards Alias"
3. "Don't Tread So Fast"
4. "These Lights"
5. "No Regrets"
6. "All You Say"
7. "The Anti-Life"
8. "True Sounds"
9. "Wings"
10. "Put Down, Shut Up"
11. "Hey Dave!" (Acoustic track included on Do The Dog 2006 release)
12. "Goodbye Richmond Close" (Acoustic track included on Do The Dog 2006 release)
