= Transmission Recordings =

- Parent company: Transmission Recordings
- Founded: 1993 and re-launched 2010
- Status: Active
- Genre: Various
- Country of origin: UK
- Official website: Official website

Transmission Recordings is a British independent record label owned and operated by the Notting Hill Music Group plc. The company was founded in 1993 by the Notting Hill Music Group plc.

== History ==
Transmission Recordings is a London-based independent record label founded in 1993, and re-launched as the audio division of The Notting Hill Music Group plc, in October 2009.

Music Week published an in depth insight into how the company has developed and evolved over the years to become "one of the UK's best-loved global independent music fortresses" whilst over coming "the so-called collapse of the music industry".

Transmission's roster includes over a dozen artists covering indie, pop and dance genres. Its stated aims to build a diverse catalogue of master rights across all musical genres for multi-territory release.

== Artists ==
Transmission has signed and released records by Natives, The Adventures of Stevie V, Lost Witness, Ayah Marar, The King Blues, Sam Gray, Bleach Blood, Casino, Fugative, Ruby Goe, Kid Massive, Bodyrox, Duke, Antoine Becks, Kids in Glass Houses, Octaynium and Meital Dohan.
