= The Chameleon Script =

Studio album by Howards Alias
- Released: 28 October 2002
- Recorded: 2002
- Genre: Third-Wave Ska
- Length: 37:02
- Label: Good Clean Fun Records GCF004

Howards Alias chronology
Howards Alias (Unreleased) (2001)	The Chameleon Script (2002)	The Answer Is Never (2004)

Professional ratings
Review scores
Source	Rating
Punknews.co.uk	4/5 link

The Chameleon Script is the first officially released full-length album recorded by the band Howards Alias.

The album was released by Good Clean Fun Records on 28 October 2002 on compact disc. It was hailed as an instant classic in the rising UK ska-core scene, and received critical acclaim even from the UK's famous mainstream rock weekly, Kerrang!.

The album had predominant ska brass lines and guitar upstrokes, features that Howards Alias moved away from on later releases as their sound evolved.

== Track listing ==
1. "Rob Wants You Dead"
2. "The Temptress Tales"
3. "Exile"
4. "Head Up"
5. "The Anti-Life"
6. "One Wish"
7. "Last Lung"
8. "You"
9. "Doreen"
10. "Abrade"
11. "One to One"
