= Household Name Records =

British record label

Household Name Records is a DIY punk rock record label, based in London, UK founded in 1996. It has been home to notable artists including Capdown, Howards Alias, Lightyear, and Adequate Seven.

== Biography ==
Household Name Records was started in 1996 by David "Lil" Giles and Katherine "Kafren" Vik to promote unknown UK bands. Encouraged after successfully releasing their first compilation the team planned several more releases. To begin with the label focused on hardcore punk.

In May 2000, the label released Capdown's debut album Civil Disobedients. The album featured hardcore, but also mixed in ska and dub. According to Drowned in sound the album kick-started an underground punk scene. The album went on to be listed at 76 in the NME's top one hundred list for the decade.

The success of Capdown allowed the record label to diversify its roster with more experimental punk bands. In turn the label had a great impact on the UK punk scene.

== Household Name Records artists ==
=== Current roster ===
- Billy No Mates
- Dissociates
- Chief
- The Cut Ups
- Great Cynics

=== Previous bands ===
- The 241ers
- Adequate Seven
- Antimaniax
- The Arteries
- Assert
- Belvedere
- Big D and the Kids Table
- Bombshell Rocks
- Brain Failure
- Breed 77
- Bullets To Broadway
- Canvas
- Capdown
- Captain Everything!
- Da Skywalkers
- Dead Inside
- Enemy Alliance
- Ensign
- Fig.4.0
- The Filaments
- Five Knuckle
- The Foamers
- Former Cell Mates
- Griswalds
- The Hard-Ons
- Hard Skin
- HHH
- Hostage Life
- Howards Alias
- Imbalance
- Indecision
- John Holmes
- Kafka
- Kenisia
- The Kenmores
- The King Blues
- Knuckledust
- Leftöver Crack
- Lightyear
- Lockdown
- Loophole
- Medulla Nocte
- Milloy
- Not Waving But Drowning
- One Fine Day
- The Peacocks
- The Planet Smashers
- Red Lights Flash
- Satanic Surfers
- Scraper
- Silencer 7
- Snap Her
- Special Move
- Spectreman
- Suicide Bid
- Taint
- The Take
- Thinktank
- This is a Standoff
- Two Cow Garage
- Vic Ruggiero
- Withdrawn
- Yeast
- Ye Wiles
- You Me and the Atom Bomb
- Zatopeks
