= Shootin' Goon =

Welsh ska punk band

- Shootin Goon in 2004 at the Bristol Croft

Background information
- Origin: Wales
- Genre: Ska punk
- Labels: Good Clean Fun Records; Moon Ska Europe

Shootin' Goon were a Welsh ska punk outfit of the late 1990s and early 2000s who were signed to the label Moon Ska Europe and later Good Clean Fun Records.

Shootin' Goon released their debut album Splottside Rocksteady in 2000, with the title inspired by the Splott area of the band's hometown of Cardiff. The band later signed to lead singer Matt's own record label Good Clean Fun Records, and released the Left for Dead EP in 2003. The EP was reviewed by skateboarder Bam Margera for rock magazine Kerrang!, in which he declared "I thought I was at the fucking circus!" prompting the band to sell T-shirts with the quote printed on them.

The band broke up in 2004 following a self-organised tour. Following the band's demise Matt became manager of fellow Cardiff band Adequate Seven. The band reformed for a one-off show in support of Adequate Seven on their last gig in Cardiff on 10 December 2006.

== Lineup ==
Original lineup (1998):

- St. John of Caerphilly – vocals (left just weeks after the completion of Splottside Rocksteady in 1999 and in 2000 the vocals were re-recorded by new singer James)
- Paul Hewett – guitar
- Jimi Hewett – bass
- James 'Ferret' Watkins – trumpet
- Dan – saxophone
- Dan Jones – trombone
- Tom Harle – trombone
- Sam Kendall – drums

Later band members: Some members were needed only once

- Dan S (a.k.a. Yeti from the north) – Sax (joined in 1999?, left a few years later)
- James Alexander – vocals (joined early 2000)
- Matt "Cheap" Redd – vocals (joined 2002, previously of The Cheapskates)
- Tom Harle – trombone (joined 1999, also appears on The Cheapskates EP and Adequate Seven's Here on Earth)
- Tom Pinder – trombone (joined 2001, also played trombone for Adequate Seven)
- Nick Briggs (a.k.a. The Greek) – sax
- Matt Price – trumpet (joined late 2000, also original member of Adequate Seven)

== Discography ==
- Splottside Rocksteady (2000)
- Big Up Clash (split with Lubby Nugget) (2001)
- Left for Dead (2003)
