= Captain Everything! =

British punk band

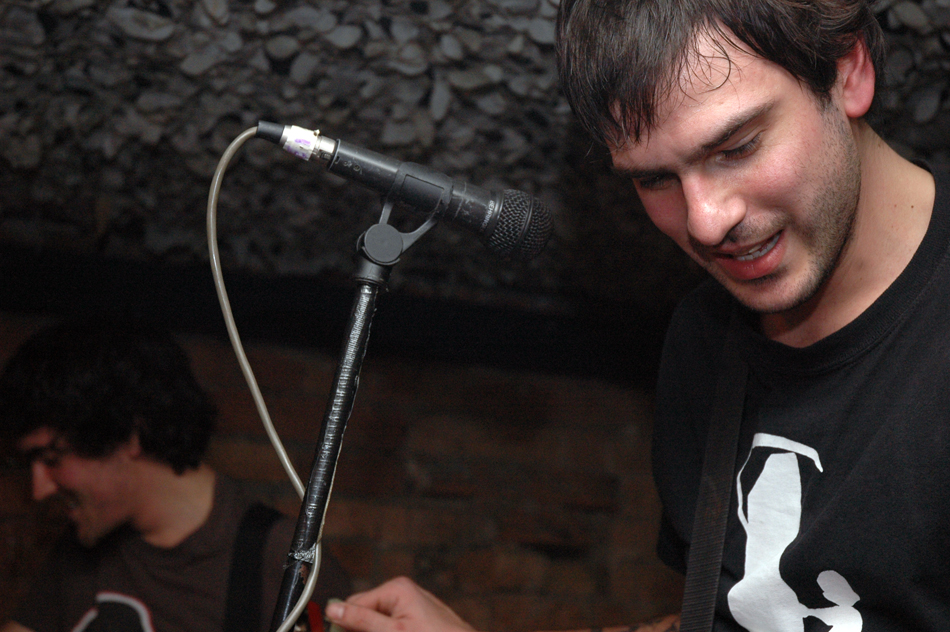
- Captain Everything! at The Victoria Inn, Derby, 2/2/2006.

Background information
- Origin: Watford, England
- Genre: Punk Skate punk
- Years active: 1998–2007 2010-2011
- Label: Household Name Records
- Past members: Jon Whitehouse; Lewis Froy; Blake Davies; Richard Phoenix

Captain Everything! were a British punk band from Watford, England. Formed in 1998, the band play high tempo pop-punk, which was branded "Bubblegum Thrash". Renowned for their heavy touring schedule, they have played all over the UK and Europe, touring with bands such as The Vandals, Capdown, and Nerf Herder. They were part of the roster of London punk label Household Name Records.

== History ==
They met at Parmiter's School and formed in 1998.

Household Name records signed the band in 2002 and re-issued the album Learning to Play With....

Their extensive touring of the UK included playing the Lockup Stage at Reading Festival. They have also toured in Russia, Canada and Japan.

In 2006, the band had two releases and toured in support of the Canadian punk rock band Propagandhi.

== Other projects ==
Lewis Froy is the lead vocalist and guitarist of The Social Club, who released a trilogy of EPs — For Drinking (2011), For Dancing (2012), and For Conversation (2013) — on Alcopop! Records, before releasing their debut album Normal (2025) via The LP Café and Bonfire Club Records. Blake Davies, Captain Everything!'s second drummer, played on their first two EP releases.

Richard Phoenix became the drummer of The Steal until they split up in 2009. He is an established artist "integrating painting, writing, music and facilitation," and has been working in London since 2015.

== Band members ==
- Jon Whitehouse - bass guitar/vocals (1998-2011)
- Lewis Froy - guitar/vocals (1998-2011)
- Blake Davies - drums (2005–2007)
- Richard Phoenix - drums (1998–2005, 2010–2011)

== Discography ==
=== Albums/DVDs ===
Year	Album	Label
1998	Music by Idiots	Hectic Records
2000	Learning to Play With...	Hectic Records
2001	Make the Love Connection (split with Route 215)	20 Deck Recordings
2002	Learning to Play With... (re-issue)	Household Name Records
2003	It's Not Rocket Science	Household Name Records
2004	Live at the Camden Underworld DVD (split with Belvedere and Divit)	Punkervision
2006	Buena Vista Bingo Club	Household Name Records

=== Singles ===
Year	Album	Label
2006	"Bomb Song"	Household Name Records

=== Music videos ===
- Bomb Song (2006)
