= Capdown =

English punk rock band

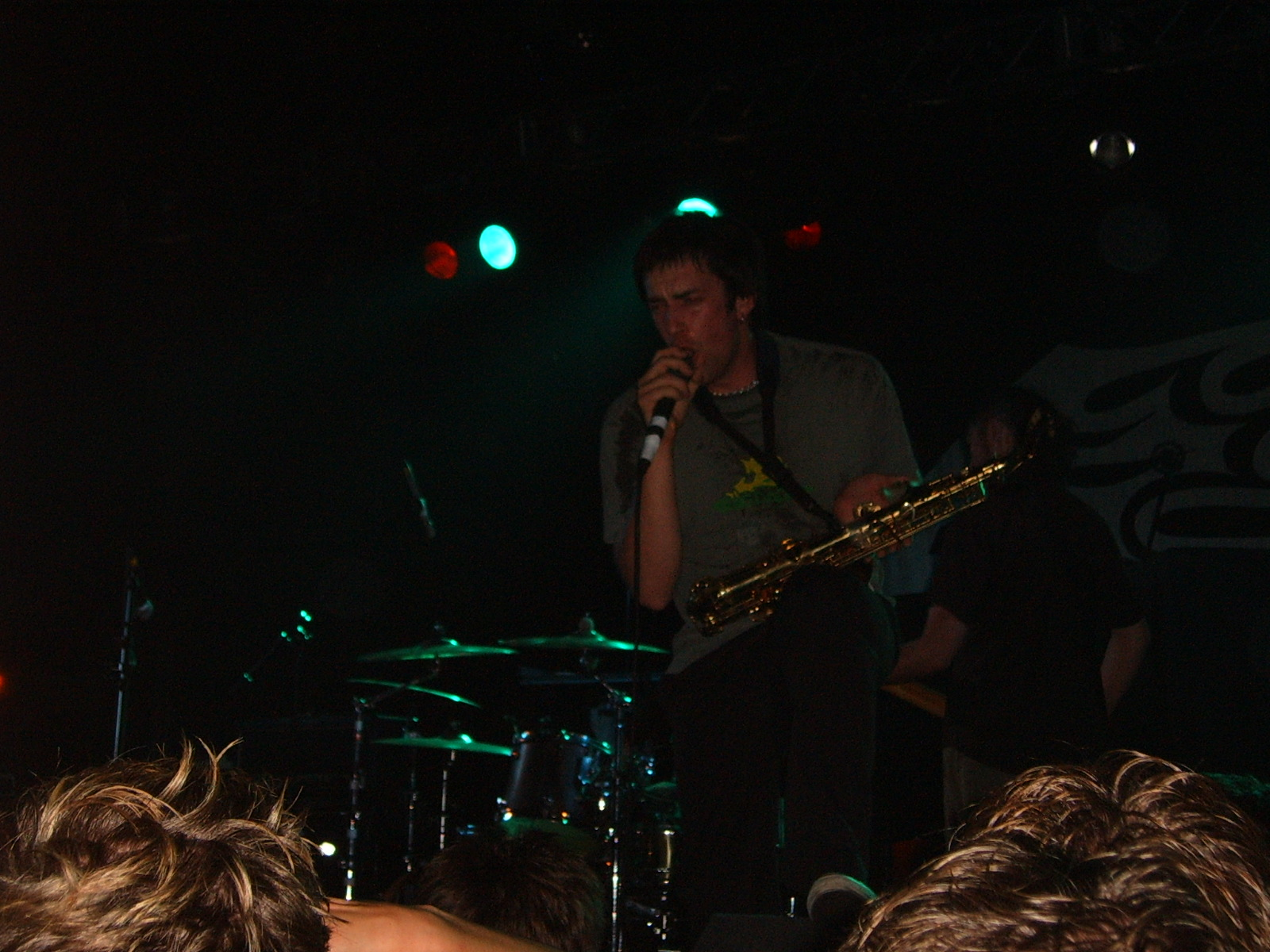
- Capdown performing at the University of East Anglia in 2005, with Jake Sims-Fielding in the foreground

Background information
- Also known as: Soap (1997–1999)
- Origin: Milton Keynes, England
- Genres: Ska punk, hardcore punk
- Years active: 1997–2007; 2008; 2010–2021
- Labels: Household Name; Gravity DIP; Fierce Panda
- Past members: Jake Sims-Fielding; Robin "Boob" Goold; Keith Minter; Tim Macdonald; Andrew "Eddie" Hunt
- Website: capdown.net

Capdown (Note: Also initially spelled as CapDown, such as in the liner notes for Civil Disobedients) were an English punk rock band from Milton Keynes. Originally known as Soap, their songs have political themes as alluded to by their name, which is a portmanteau of Capitalist Downfall. Mixing ska, punk, hardcore, dub, drum and bass, and reggae, Capdown built a reputation around their independent releases and numerous tours.

== Career ==
The band members had been playing together since the age of 14. The band, originally known as Soap, had sent the demo of the Time For Change EP to the indie Household Name Records in 1998 and had played a gig with Link 80 at the record company's request, which led to them being signed onto the label. The EP was released in 1999 under the new name of the band, Capdown (short for Capitalist Downfall).

In May 2000, Household Name Records released Capdown's debut album Civil Disobedients. The album featured hardcore, but also mixed in ska and dub. According to Drowned in Sound the album kick started an underground punk scene. The album went on to be listed at 76 in the NME's top one hundred list for the decade. In the same year Capdown played nearly 250 gigs.

In early 2001, Capdown toured with a number of established American bands, including Less Than Jake and played the Deconstruction touring festival with Pennywise and Lagwagon.

In September 2001, Capdown released their second album, Pound for the Sound, receiving positive reviews from Kerrang!. The following year saw tours with Bad Religion and Hundred Reasons. Capdown was featured in the 2002 BBC documentary Brassic Beats about the British ska punk scene.

In 2003 the band signed to Fierce Panda Records, releasing two EPs: Act Your Rage and New Revolutionaries. The former reached the 80th spot on the UK Singles Chart on 10 May 2003. As of November 2004, Civil Disobedients and Pound for the Sound have sold more than 30 thousand copies together. The band received critical acclaim for their live performances. In 2006, Capdown played at the first Slam Dunk Festival.

The final line-up consisted of Jake Sims-Fielding (vocals and saxophone), Robin "Boob" Goold (bass guitar), Keith Minter (guitar and vocals), Tim Macdonald (drums) and a new addition, Andrew "Eddie" Hunt (keyboards/samples).

They released their final album on 5 February 2007, entitled Wind Up Toys on Fierce Panda Records.

The band split up after their final UK tour, which was due to be 9 November 2007, in their home town of Milton Keynes. However their 'final show' took place on 7 June 2008, at the Pitz club in Milton Keynes, following a 'warm up' at the Peel in Kingston upon Thames on 5 June 2008.

It was announced in 2010 that Capdown were to reform exclusively for the Slam Dunk Festival, held in London and Leeds on 29 and 30 May that year. However, the band also played at the Rebellion Festival in Blackpool on 6 August 2011. In addition, they appeared at the Hevy Music Festival in Kent, between 5 and 8 August 2011 and at the Reading and Leeds Festival on 27–28 August 2011. In December 2014 the band played together with Me First and the Gimme Gimmes and The Skints on the Jägermeister Music Tour.

In May 2012, 2014, 2016, 2018, and September 2021, the band played at the Slam Dunk Festival in Leeds and Hatfield, United Kingdom.

== Other projects ==
Following the original demise of Capdown, both Goold and Macdonald worked on a new band, The Maccalites, alongside Simon Wells from Snuff/Southport. Goold, Minter and Macdonald are also members of rock band This Contrast Kills.

Since 2012 Robin Goold and Tim Macdonald have been working on The GetGone with Ben Hyman, David Lloyd (1000 Hz) and Rob Blay. The band have released the 5 track Stories and Ruses EP in 2013, and their debut album One Thousand Ways To Live in April 2016. Both recorded and produced by Capdown's Keith Minter.

As of 2013 Tim Macdonald has been playing drums in the UK Hardcore band Menshevik along with Steve Pitcher of Vanilla Pod, Dan Hawcroft previously of Whizzwood and Robert Dempsey of Mustard City Rockers.

== Discography ==
=== Albums ===
Year	Album title	Label
2000	Civil Disobedients	Household Name
2001	Pound for the Sound	Household Name
2007	Wind Up Toys	Fierce Panda

=== Singles ===
Year	Title	Label
2003	Act Your Rage	Fierce Panda
2003	New Revolutionaries	Gravity DIP
2006	Keeping Up Appearances	Fierce Panda
2007	Surviving the Death of a Genre	Fierce Panda
2007	No Matter What	Fierce Panda

=== Music videos ===
- Act Your Rage (2003)
- New Revolutionaries (2003)

=== Other releases ===
Year	Title	Label	Notes
1999	Time for Change EP	Household Name	
2000	Split EP	Household Name	Split with Link 80
2001	Christmas Fisting EP	Household Name	Split with Hard Skin and Southport
2003	Live in Brighton	Punker Bunker	Live DVD; split with Rude Bones
2005	Live in M.K.	Gravity DIP	Live album
2007	Live EP	Fierce Panda	Live EP; included with some editions of Wind Up Toys and subsequently given away as a free download

== Critical reception ==
In June 2021, Louder included the band in a 'best of' list, saying "Capdown kick-started something of a movement here in the UK ...", and that if things had gone differently it could have been massive.
