= Mike Davies (broadcaster) =

British DJ (born 1978)

Mike Davies (born August 8, 1978) is an American firefighter and former disc jockey on BBC Radio 1 in the United Kingdom.

== Early life ==
Davies was born in Culver City, California on August 8, 1978, to British parents, where he lived until he left high school, aged 19. As a boy he spent a lot of time in the UK, to which he attributed his love for music.

In 1998, aged 19 years old, he moved to Santa Barbara, California where he studied graphic design. His love for music turned into a passion, and he decided to give up art school and pursue a career in radio. In 2001 he moved to London where he began working as a runner at Radio 1, later working with Steve Lamacq and The Evening Session at The Deconstruction Tour, where he was invited to a more permanent role.

== Career ==
In January 2002, Radio 1 gave Mike a slot on the station to build his own show from scratch: and with it he created the highly successful programme The Lock Up. This show aired originally on Wednesday mornings, as a successor to Andy Kershaw's show. He quickly achieved a big following- with celebrity fans including Rancid, Less Than Jake and Bad Religion. In July 2004, he was given the chance to come out of the darkness of Wednesday mornings and host the "Lock Up" on Tuesday nights. At the same time he took over Radio 1's Rock Show from Mary Anne Hobbs.

He continued to host both these shows until September 2006, when he announced his intention to move back to Los Angeles. This meant the end of both The Lock Up and his stint as the Rock Show host- to be succeeded by former A bassist Daniel P. Carter.

On his return to the United States, Davies joined the Hawthorne Police Department as a police officer, later becoming a paramedic and member of the departments SWAT team. Through his medical training, he gained an interest in Fire and emergency medical response and retrained to become a fire fighter.

He later hosted Radio 1's Punk Show, Wednesday nights in the UK which was broadcast on Sirius in America. He organizes the line-up for the Lock-Up stage at the Reading and Leeds Festivals.

In June 2014, it was announced that due to BBC budget cuts, Davies would no longer present a show on BBC Radio 1 starting September 1, 2014. As a result of the reshuffle Daniel P. Carter's Rock Show was extended an extra hour and move to the primetime slot following the Official Chart Show, of 7pm till 10pm.

== See also ==
- BBC Radio 1
- Daniel P. Carter
