= Jonny "Itch" Fox =

English rapper

Itch
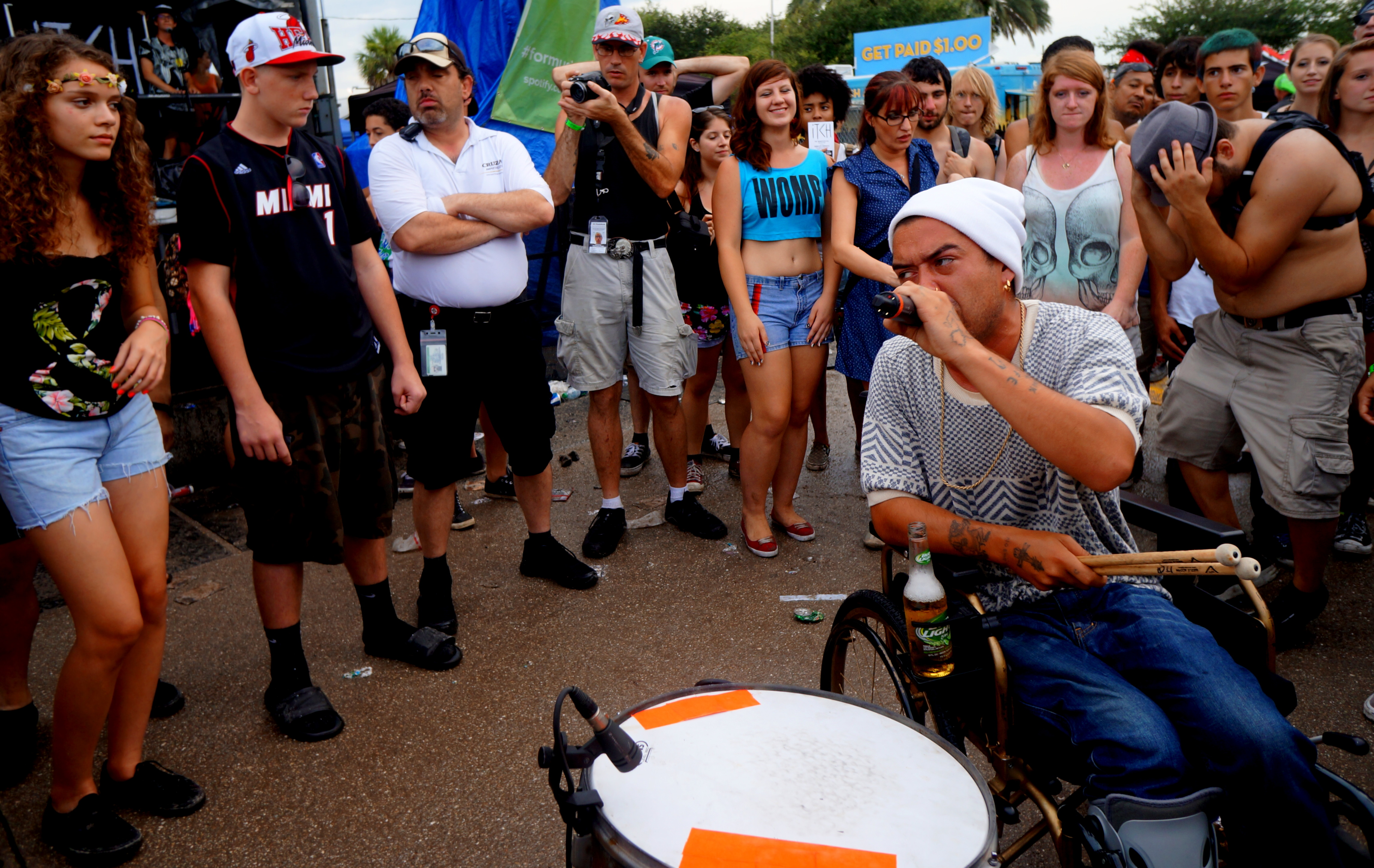
- Itch at Vans Warped Tour 2013

Background information
- Born: South London, England
- Occupation: Rapper
- Instruments: Vocals, ukulele
- Years active: 2004–12; 2015–present: with the band The King Blues; 2012–15: solo singer-songwriter
- Label: Red Bull Records
- Website: itchsmixes.com

Jonathan Fox, better known simply by his stage name Itch, is an English rapper. Fox is the lead vocalist of The King Blues, previously performing briefly as a solo musician during the band's absence.

== Early life ==
Jonathan Fox was born and grew up in South London, England. His mother is from Malaysia. At the age of 13, he was homeless and sold copies of The Big Issue to make some money.

== Music career ==
=== 2004–12: The King Blues ===
In 2004, Fox released a solo EP under the name The King Blues. However, he began recording with a number of different musicians before settling on a permanent lineup. They initially played in squats around London.

In 2010, Fox collaborated with UK band Faithless on their song "Crazy Bal'heads" for their album The Dance.

In April 2012, the band announced that they would split, with their final album, Long Live the Struggle, to be released months later in July 2012.

=== 2012–2015: Solo career ===
Soon after The King Blues' breakup, Itch flew to Los Angeles to begin working on solo material with collaborator John Feldmann of Goldfinger. His first solo full-length, The Deep End, released in March 2014 by Red Bull Records, featured guest appearances by Adam Lazzara of Taking Back Sunday, Matisyahu, and Patrick Stump of Fall Out Boy. He began touring extensively, including performances at the Reading and Leeds Festivals and UK dates with Scroobius Pip. Itch fractured his heel during a show at London's Jazz Café in June 2013, and subsequently spent the rest of the summer on Vans Warped Tour in a wheelchair. Itch also played a number of dates on The Kevin Says Tour for Warped Tour UK. Itch, Fruitbag and Jamie Jazz all reunited in May 2014 for a three-song one-off encore after Itch's set at the 100 Club in London. Itch had massive success in Australia where his single "Another Man" was certified double platinum and remained in the top 50 for 14 weeks.

=== 2015–present: Reunion of The King Blues ===
On 25 November 2015, The King Blues announced their return, as well as announcing tour dates for Enter Shikari, for whom they would appear as special guests on their Mindsweep Tour the following year.

In 2016, the band released "Off with Their Heads" on rapper Scroobius Pip's Speech Development record label.

In 2017, the band signed to Cooking Vinyl Records and released their fifth full-length album The Gospel Truth.

Itch wrote a poem called "Manchester" after the Manchester bombings which was used by ITN News in their report.

Itch released his first book 101 Haikus which was crowd-funded and reached its goal within hours of being announced. The book went on to become an Amazon Best Seller.

In 2019, Itch wrote "38 Minutes" a musical based on a false alert in Hawaii. The live show was sold out months in advance and the soundtrack made the UK iTunes Top 40.

Itch also released his second book "Tall Stories", a collection of fictional short stories.

== Controversy ==
In June 2016, during their performance at the Glastonwick festival (where The King Blues were also playing), The Tuts referred to sexual assault and domestic violence allegations published in a blog by a former romantic partner of Itch. Immediately after the festival they uploaded a now-deleted video to their YouTube channel, along with the full text of their speech.

Following the statement from The Tuts, Itch released his own statement on The King Blues Facebook page in 2017 addressing some of the allegations, calling it an "organised smear campaign" and denying the accusations made against him. In the statement he refers to being "hit", "scratched", and "bitten" by one of the women who made the allegations during their relationship.

He addressed the allegations again in an interview, where he speaks about his experience with one of the accusers in detail, and spoke out about false accusations and their impact on victims of domestic violence

Following a legal hearing in May 2019 it was publicly announced that Itch was pursuing legal action to sue the band and his former partner over the allegations as defamation and harassment. The defendants launched a fundraiser for legal fees under the banner Solidarity Not Silence. On 3 August 2021, it was confirmed that the libel case had been settled out of court on mutually acceptable terms without any admissions of liability. Default judgement was awarded towards Itch for one of the defamation cases he had initiated and was published on BAILII, citing that the defendant failed to respond to his claim.

== Discography ==
=== Extended plays ===
- Manifesto Part 1: How to Fucking Rule at Life (2012)
- Manifesto Part 2: We’re All in the Gutter (2013)

=== Studio albums ===
Title	Details	Peak chart positions									Certifications (sales threshold)
Title	Details	AUS	AUT	CAN	DEN	GER	IRE	NL	NZ	US	Certifications (sales threshold)
The Deep End	Released: 28 March 2014; Label: Red Bull; Formats: CD, Digital download	12	—	—	—	—	—	—	—	—	

=== Singles ===
Year	Single	Peak positions		Album
Year	Single	UK	AUS	Album
2013	"Best Shot"	—	—	
2014	"Another Man" (featuring Megan Joy)	—	12	
