= List of Michigan State Historic Sites in Livingston County =

Location of Livingston County in Michigan

The following is a list of Michigan State Historic Sites in Livingston County, Michigan. Sites marked with a dagger (†) are also listed on the National Register of Historic Places in Livingston County, Michigan.

== Current listings ==
Name	Image	Location	City	Listing date
Ann Arbor Railroad†		126 Wetmore Street	Howell	December 11, 1970
Appleton House		325 East Grand River Avenue	Brighton	February 11, 1972
Bingham House† / Kinsley S. Bingham Informational Designation		13270 Silver Lake Road	Green Oak Township	June 28, 1973
Brighton District No. 8 School		11455 Buno Road	Brighton	April 10, 1986
Brighton Town Hall		202 W Main Street	Brighton	April 29, 1982
Brighton Village Cemetery		West St. Paul Street at West Street, east side of the mill pond	Brighton	January 20, 2000
First Congregational Church of Tyrone		9141 Hartland Road	Fenton	October 20, 1994
First Presbyterian Church		20175 Williamsville Road	Gregory	2004
Fowlerville School (demolished)		216 North Collins Street	Fowlerville	June 15, 1984
George W. Lee House		404 South Walnut Street	Howell	2006
Hartland Burying Grounds		Henry Road at Hartland Road	Hartland	2006
Hartland Music Hall		3619 Avon Street, SE corner of George Street	Hartland	January 18, 1980
Florence B. Deering Museum (Hartland Town Hall)		3503 Avon Street	Hartland	August 15, 1975
Frank J. Hecox House†		3720 Grand River	Howell	April 22, 1993
Howell Carnegie Library		314 Grand River	Howell	March 6, 1997
Howell School District No. 5 Schoolhouse (demolished)		4790 Grand River	Howell	November 1, 1988
Livermore Cemetery		15598 M-36, North side of M-36, NE of intersection with Livermore Road, 2 miles E of Gregory	Gregory vicinity	January 17, 1986
James J. Livermore House		15210 Livermore Road, between M-36 and Doyle Road	Pinckney vicinity	June 15, 1979
Livingston County Courthouse†		Grand River Avenue	Howell	April 4, 1975
Livingston County Press Commemorative Designation		323 East Grand River Avenue	Howell	August 31, 1993
George Louk Farm†		1885 Tooley Road	Howell Township	June 15, 1995
William McPherson Sr. House		419 North Michigan Avenue	Howell	April 24, 1981
Alonzo W. Olds House†		10084 Rushton Road, SW corner of 10 Mile Road	South Lyon vicinity	May 18, 1971
Howell Opera House		123 West Grand River	Howell	February 11, 1972
Plainfield Methodist Protestant Church		17845 M-36 between Bradley and Dutton Roads	Unadilla	July 18, 1996
Saint Augustine Church and Cemetery†		6841 Faussett Road	Howell	June 15, 1995
St. John the Baptist Catholic Church		1991 Hacker Road, SW corner of M-59	Oceola Township	May 17, 1978
Saint Paul's Church		200 West St. Paul Street	Brighton	April 29, 1982
St. Patrick Church / St. Patrick Calvary Cemetery		711 Rickett Road	Brighton	2013
Saint Stephen's Church		10585 Hamburg Road	Hamburg	February 27, 1970}
Spanish–American War Regiments Informational Site		Entrance to Island Lake State Park, 2.5 miles east of Brighton, Grand River Avenue	Brighton vicinity	January 19, 1957
Tyrone Township Hall		10408 Center Road	Fenton	August 3, 1979
Tom Walker's Grist Mill		8507 Parshallville Road, junction of Cullen Road	Parshallville	April 5, 1974
August Westphal Farmstead†		6430 Brighton Road	Brighton vicinity	March 16, 1981
Governor Edwin B. Winans / Hamburg Informational Designation		10964 Hamburg Rd	Whitmore Lake	July 17, 1986

== See also ==
- National Register of Historic Places listings in Livingston County, Michigan

== Sources ==
- Historic Sites Online – Livingston County. Michigan State Housing Developmental Authority. Accessed March 30, 2011.
