= National Register of Historic Places listings in Livingston County, Michigan =

The following is a list of Registered Historic Places in Livingston County, Michigan.
This National Park Service list is complete through NPS recent listings posted September 26, 2025.

	Name on the Register	Image	Date listed	Location	City or town	Description
1	Ann Arbor Railway Station	Ann Arbor Railway Station	May 6, 1971 (#71000405)	126 Wetmore Street; 42°36′34″N 83°55′46″W	Howell	
2	Bingham House	Bingham House	October 18, 1972 (#72000635)	13270 Silver Lake Road; 42°29′51″N 83°41′01″W	Brighton	
3	Jacob Fishbeck Farmstead	Jacob Fishbeck Farmstead	April 2, 2003 (#03000178)	5151 Crooked Lake Road; 42°33′28″N 83°51′03″W	Genoa Township	
4	John H. and Martha Durfee Galloway House	John H. and Martha Durfee Galloway House	November 15, 2006 (#06001030)	216 Higgins Street; 42°36′33″N 83°55′35″W	Howell	
5	Frank J. Hecox House	Frank J. Hecox House	July 22, 1994 (#94000745)	3720 West Grand River Avenue, Howell Township; 42°37′43″N 83°59′14″W	Howell	
6	Howell Downtown Historic District	Howell Downtown Historic District	February 27, 1987 (#86003363)	Roughly bounded by Clinton, Barnard, Sibley, and Chestnut Streets; 42°36′27″N 83°55′49″W	Howell	
7	Livingston County Courthouse	Livingston County Courthouse	August 13, 1976 (#76001031)	Grand River Avenue; 42°36′26″N 83°55′41″W	Howell	
8	George Louk Farm	George Louk Farm	June 15, 1995 (#95000285)	1885 Tooley Road, Howell Township; 42°37′40″N 83°58′34″W	Howell	
9	Alonzo W. Olds House	Alonzo W. Olds House	May 5, 1972 (#72000636)	10084 Rushton Road; 42°27′28″N 83°41′49″W	Rushton	
10	St. Augustine Catholic Church and Cemetery	St. Augustine Catholic Church and Cemetery	July 25, 1996 (#96000802)	6481 Faussett Road, Deerfield Township; 42°42′21″N 83°49′20″W	Hartland	
11	William K. and Nellie (Harper) Sexton House	William K. and Nellie (Harper) Sexton House	September 30, 2013 (#13000797)	205 Mason Road (Marion Township); 42°36′00″N 83°56′08″W	Howell vicinity	
12	Timothy and Lucretia Jones Warner Homestead	Timothy and Lucretia Jones Warner Homestead	September 8, 2011 (#11000635)	4001 Pleasant Valley Road (Brighton Township); 42°32′45″N 83°42′51″W	Brighton vicinity	
13	Western House	Western House	April 17, 1986 (#86000806)	500 West Main Street; 42°31′46″N 83°47′08″W	Brighton	
14	August Westphal Farmstead	August Westphal Farmstead	September 12, 1985 (#85002151)	6430 Brighton Road; 42°31′39″N 83°49′27″W	Brighton	

== See also ==
- List of Michigan State Historic Sites in Livingston County, Michigan
- List of National Historic Landmarks in Michigan
- National Register of Historic Places listings in Michigan
- Listings in neighboring counties: Genesee, Ingham, Jackson, Oakland, Shiawassee, Washtenaw
