= William K. and Nellie (Harper) Sexton House =

Historic house in Michigan, United States

- U.S. National Register of Historic Places
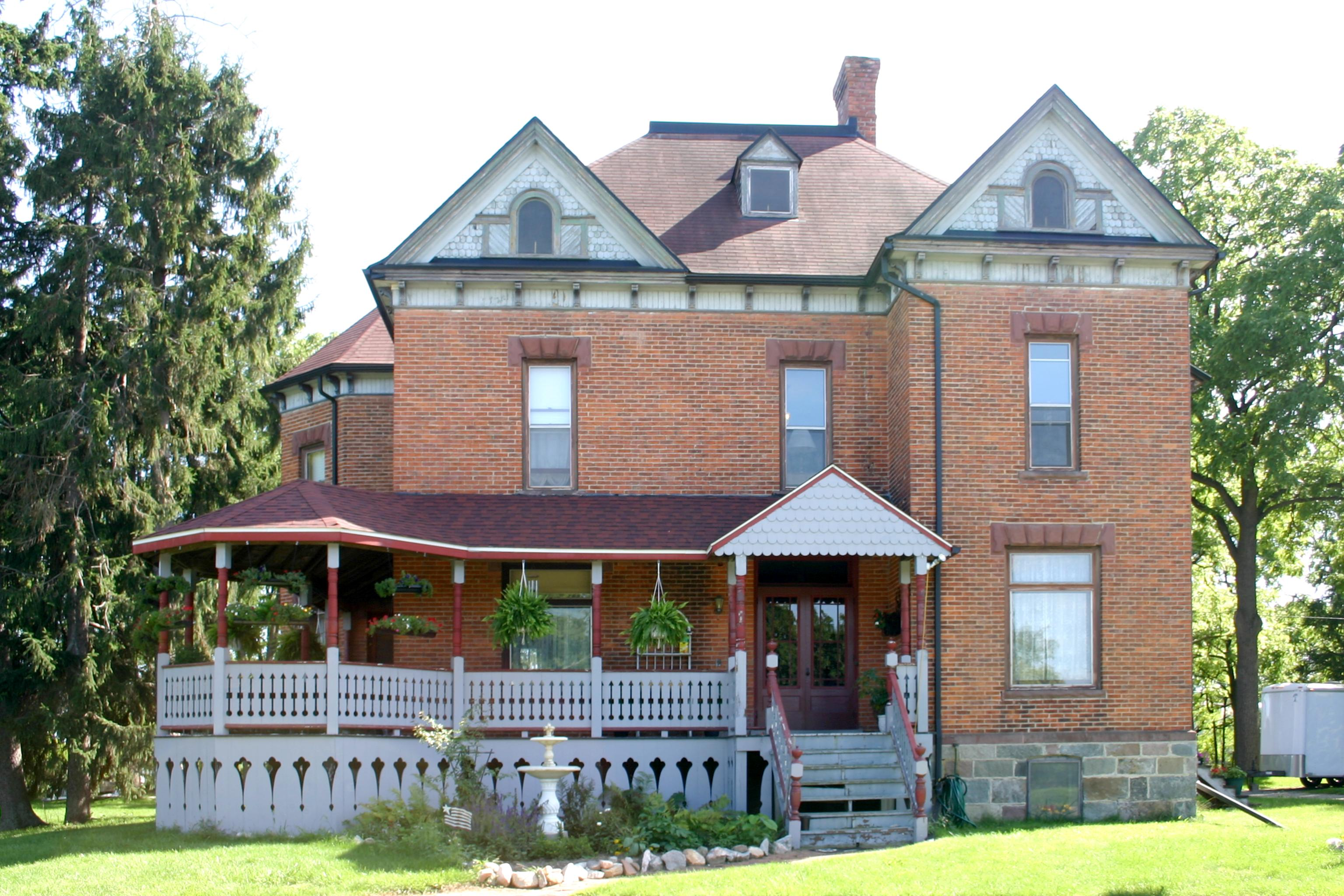

- Location within Michigan Location within the United States
- Interactive map
- Location: 205 Mason Road; Marion Township, Michigan
- Coordinates: 42°36′00″N 83°56′08″W
- Built: 1896
- Architectural style: Queen Anne
- Demolished: December 2025
- NRHP reference No.: 13000797
- Added to NRHP: September 30, 2013

The William K. and Nellie (Harper) Sexton House was a private residence located at 205 Mason Road in Marion Township, Michigan. The house was listed on the National Register of Historic Places in 2013. It was demolished in late December 2025.

== History ==
William Kendrick Sexton was born in 1835 in Sherburne, New York. His father moved to Michigan in 1837. Sexton was educated in Michigan, then attended the Commercial College in Chicago in 1858 and went to work for the Cairo and Fulton Railroad Company. He returned home to Michigan in 1860 to marry Cynthia L. Adams of Utica, Michigan, then purchased 240 acres of his father's land and began farming. His farm was prosperous, and he quickly became an important local businessman by the 1870s. In the 1880s he began breeding cattle, being one of the first in the United States to breed Holsteins. His cattle began breaking records for milk production.

In 1894, Cynthia died. In 1895, Sexton began construction on this house to serve as his home and as place to entertain cattle buyers close to the city of Howell. The house was completed in 1896, and Sexton remarried, this time to Nellie Harper. He lived in this house until his death in 1917. His wife Nellie Sexton continued to live in the house afterward, until her own death in 1958.

The house caught fire and was badly damaged in November 2024, and the house was demolished in December 2025.

== Description ==
The William K. Sexton House is a two-story Queen Anne-style structure faced in red-orange brick. It has an asymmetrical plan and an irregular roofline. It sits on a high ashlar foundation topped with a stone water table. The building has a hip roof with flat deck and lower, pedimented cross gables whose ends are decorated with wooden fishscale shingles. A wooden, bracketed cornice supports the eaves. The front has a wide shed-roof porch, which wraps around to access a side entrance. The porch has a front gable decorated with fishscale shingles above the front steps. Smaller porches are on other elevations.

On the interior, an entry foyer opens to a staircase; an office, parlor, dining room, and kitchen are also located on the first floor. The second floor contains an L-shaped hallway and four bedrooms, a bathroom, and a maid's quarters. The house contains original oak, walnut, and maple trim, as well as elaborate spindlework in the stairway balustrade. There are two fireplaces on the ground floor with wooden mantles and glazed tile surrounds.

== See also ==
- National Register of Historic Places listings in Livingston County, Michigan
