= Livingston County, Michigan =

County in Michigan, United States

- County
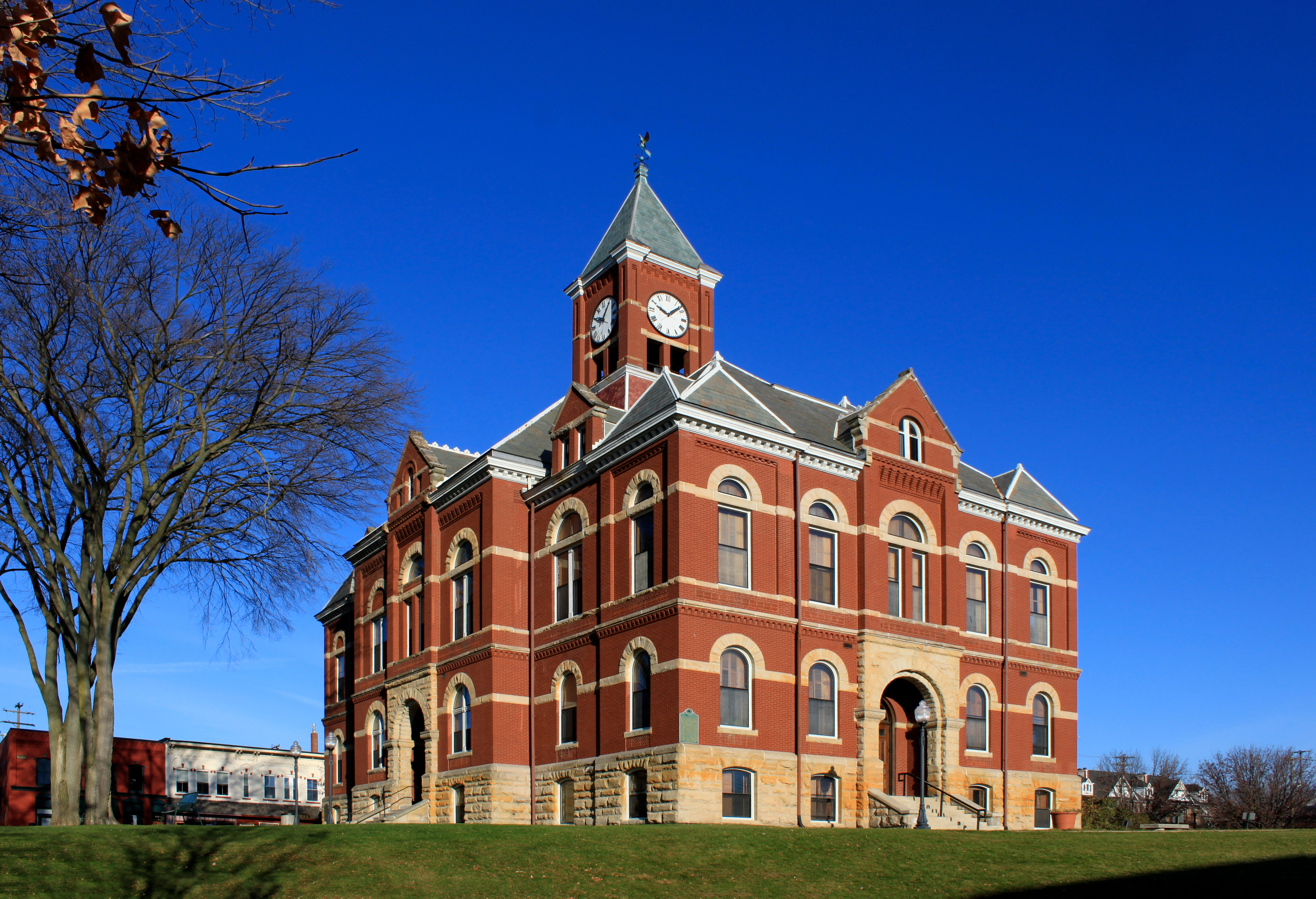
- Livingston County Courthouse in Howell

- Location within the U.S. state of Michigan
- Coordinates: 42°36′N 83°55′W
- Country: United States
- State: Michigan
- Authorized: 1833
- Organized: 1836
- Named for: Edward Livingston
- Seat: Howell
- Largest city: Howell

Area
  - Total: 585 sq mi (1,520 km^{2})
  - Land: 565 sq mi (1,460 km^{2})
  - Water: 20 sq mi (52 km^{2}) 3.4%

Population (2020)
  - Total: 193,866
  - Estimate (2025): 197,315 ▲
  - Density: 343/sq mi (132/km^{2})
- Time zone: UTC−5 (Eastern)
  - Summer (DST): UTC−4 (EDT)
- Congressional district: 7th
- Website: milivcounty.gov

Livingston County (/lɪvɪŋstən/ LIV-ing-stən) is a county in the U.S. state of Michigan. As of the 2020 census, its population was 193,866. It is part of the Detroit-Warren-Dearborn, MI Metropolitan Statistical Area. The county seat and most populous city is Howell. The county was platted in 1833, but for three years remained assigned to Shiawassee and Washtenaw counties for revenue, taxation, and judicial matters. It was formally organized in 1836. As one of Michigan's "Cabinet counties", a group of ten counties whose names honor members of President Andrew Jackson's cabinet, it is named after former U.S. Secretary of State Edward Livingston. Livingston County's location in Southeast Michigan offers residents relatively convenient access to the metropolitan centers of Detroit, Lansing, Ann Arbor, and Flint. Livingston County residents regularly commute to those centers, using the three major expressways that pass through the county: I-96, US 23, and M-59. Though largely composed of bedroom communities, the county is experiencing and maintaining significant growth in both the service and industrial economic sectors. Major employers include Tribar, PepsiCo, Citizens Insurance, and ThaiSummit. The Brighton Recreation Area is in the county.

== Geography ==
According to the U.S. Census Bureau, the county has an area of 585 square miles (1,520 km^{2}), of which 565 square miles (1,460 km^{2}) is land and 20 square miles (52 km^{2}) (3.4%) is water.

=== Adjacent counties ===
- Shiawassee County – northwest
- Genesee County – northeast
- Oakland County – east
- Washtenaw County – south
- Jackson County – southwest
- Ingham County – west

== Demographics ==
Historical population
Census	Pop.	Note	%±
1840	7,430		—
1850	13,485		81.5%
1860	16,851		25.0%
1870	19,336		14.7%
1880	22,251		15.1%
1890	20,858		−6.3%
1900	19,664		−5.7%
1910	17,736		−9.8%
1920	17,522		−1.2%
1930	19,274		10.0%
1940	20,863		8.2%
1950	26,725		28.1%
1960	38,233		43.1%
1970	58,967		54.2%
1980	100,289		70.1%
1990	115,645		15.3%
2000	156,951		35.7%
2010	180,967		15.3%
2020	193,866		7.1%
2025 (est.)	197,315	▲	1.8%
US Decennial Census; 1790–1960 1900–1990; 1990–2000 2010–2019

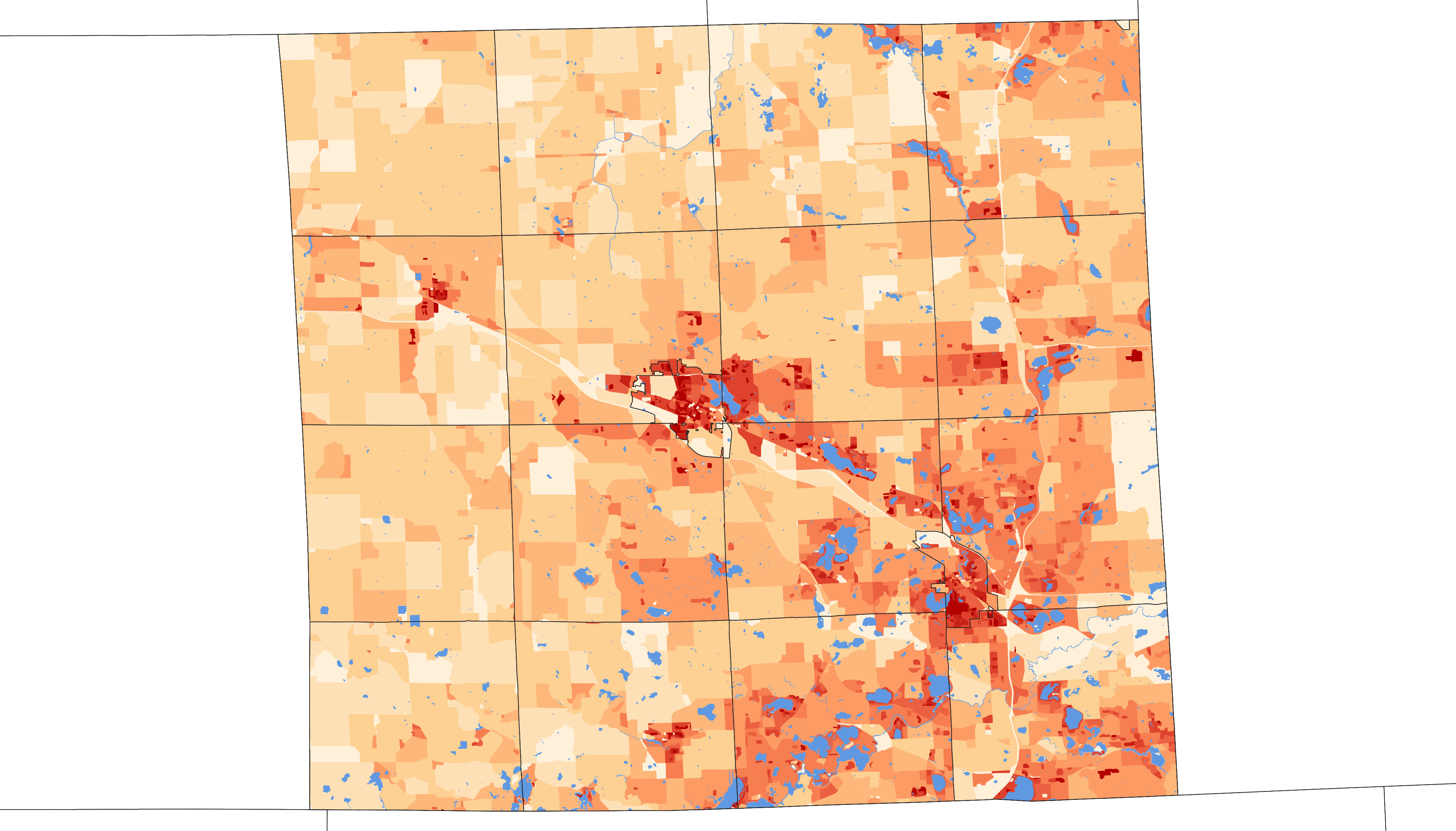
2020 population density of Livingston County MI by census block

=== Racial and ethnic composition ===
Livingston County, Michigan – Racial and ethnic composition Note: the US Census treats Hispanic/Latino as an ethnic category. This table excludes Latinos from the racial categories and assigns them to a separate category. Hispanics/Latinos may be of any race.
Race / Ethnicity (NH = Non-Hispanic)	Pop 1980	Pop 1990	Pop 2000	Pop 2010	Pop 2020	% 1980	% 1990	% 2000	% 2010	% 2020
White alone (NH)	98,212	112,827	151,170	172,513	176,756	97.93%	97.56%	96.32%	95.33%	91.17%
Black or African American alone (NH)	476	668	716	776	1,117	0.47%	0.58%	0.46%	0.43%	0.58%
Native American or Alaska Native alone (NH)	411	674	639	648	512	0.41%	0.58%	0.41%	0.36%	0.26%
Asian alone (NH)	271	476	896	1,412	1,626	0.27%	0.41%	0.57%	0.78%	0.84%
Native Hawaiian or Pacific Islander alone (NH)	x	x	40	73	113	x	x	0.03%	0.04%	0.06%
Other race alone (NH)	138	26	89	107	567	0.14%	0.02%	0.06%	0.06%	0.29%
Mixed race or Multiracial (NH)	x	x	1,448	1,978	7,672	x	x	0.92%	1.09%	3.96%
Hispanic or Latino (any race)	781	974	1,953	3,460	5,503	0.78%	0.84%	1.24%	1.91%	2.84%
Total	100,289	115,645	156,951	180,967	193,866	100.00%	100.00%	100.00%	100.00%	100.00%

=== 2020 census ===
As of the 2020 census, the county had a population of 193,866. The median age was 43.4 years, 21.4% of residents were under the age of 18, and 18.1% of residents were 65 years of age or older. For every 100 females there were 101.1 males, and for every 100 females age 18 and over there were 99.7 males age 18 and over.

The racial makeup of the county was 92.0% White, 0.6% Black or African American, 0.3% American Indian and Alaska Native, 0.9% Asian, 0.1% Native Hawaiian and Pacific Islander, 0.7% from some other race, and 5.4% from two or more races. Hispanic or Latino residents of any race comprised 2.8% of the population.

60.5% of residents lived in urban areas, while 39.5% lived in rural areas.

There were 74,264 households in the county, of which 29.8% had children under the age of 18 living in them. Of all households, 60.1% were married-couple households, 14.9% were households with a male householder and no spouse or partner present, and 18.8% were households with a female householder and no spouse or partner present. About 21.7% of all households were made up of individuals and 10.0% had someone living alone who was 65 years of age or older.

There were 78,441 housing units, of which 5.3% were vacant. Among occupied housing units, 85.9% were owner-occupied and 14.1% were renter-occupied. The homeowner vacancy rate was 0.8% and the rental vacancy rate was 5.8%.

=== 2010 census ===
As of the 2010 census, the county had 180,967 people, 55,384 households, and 43,531 families. The population density was 320 inhabitants per square mile (120/km^{2}). There were 58,919 housing units at an average density of 104 per square mile (40/km^{2}).

96.7% of the population were White, 0.8% Asian, 0.4% Black or African American, 0.4% Native American, 0.4% of some other race and 1.3% of two or more races. 1.9% were Hispanic or Latino (of any race). 20.8% were of German, 11.2% Irish, 10.6% English, 10.6% Polish, 6.5% American, 5.2% Italian and 5.1% French, French Canadian or Cajun ancestry. 95.9% spoke only English at home, while 1.7% spoke Spanish.

There were 55,384 households, of which 39.80% had children under the age of 18 living with them, 68.50% were married couples living together, 6.80% had a female householder with no husband present, and 21.40% were non-families. 17.10% of all households were made up of individuals, and 5.40% had someone living alone who was 65 years of age or older. The average household size was 2.80 and the average family size was 3.18.

In the county, 28.80% of the population was under the age of 18, 6.60% was from age 18 to 24, 31.70% was from age 25 to 44, 24.60% was from age 45 to 64, and 8.30% was 65 years or older. The median age was 36 years. For every 100 females, there were 102.10 males. For every 100 females age 18 and over, there were 99.70 males.

With a median household income of $67,400 (2008 estimate - $72,700) and a median family income of $75,284, Livingston County is the 88th highest-income county in the United States and has the second-highest median income in Michigan (after Oakland) in 2010. Males had a median income of $54,358 versus $32,073 for females. The county's per capita income was $28,069. About 2.40% of families and 3.40% of the population were below the poverty line, including 3.60% of those under age 18 and 4.50% of those age 65 or over.

A majority of the county's population resided in the southeastern communities of Brighton Township, Genoa Township, Hamburg Township, Green Oak Township, the Village of Pinckney, Putnam Township and the city of Brighton.

=== 2000 census ===
The US Census Bureau in 2000 identified Brighton, Howell, and the nearby city of South Lyon to be a contiguously urbanized area, one of the newest such areas in the United States.

== Media ==
There are two local newspapers, the Livingston County Daily Press & Argus, owned by Gannett Company, and The Community Journal, an independently owned weekly.

The Daily Press & Argus, which publishes daily except Saturday, launched in 2000 through the combination of two weekly newspapers, The Livingston County Press and The Brighton Argus, which served the communities for many decades.

The Community Journal launched in 2010. It publishes on Tuesdays, covering Pinckney, Fowlerville, and the Howell areas.The Journal is published along with the Fowlerville News and Views.

A weekly all-local paper, The Livingston Community News, launched in 2003 with offices in downtown Brighton and closed in 2009 when The Ann Arbor News, its parent company, ceased publication.

Other media in the county include WHMI-FM, a Classic Hits radio station that has local news on the hour, and LivingstonTalk.com, a web-based product launched in 2009.

The Marketeer is a free monthly magazine mailed to more than 42,000 Livingston County residents. Its content is primarily advertising from local businesses plus articles and information about people and community events. The Marketeer has been published since 1974.

== Politics ==
Livingston County falls entirely within Michigan's 7th Congressional district and is represented by Republican Tom Barrett.

Livingston County has reliably supported the Republican Party since its founding. Since 1884, Republican presidential nominees have carried the county in 30 of 36 elections, and all but one since 1936 (losing only in 1964).

United States presidential election results for Livingston County, Michigan
Year	Republican		Democratic		Third party(ies)	
Year	No.	%	No.	%	No.	%
1884	2,597	44.72%	2,938	50.59%	272	4.68%
1888	2,706	44.99%	2,842	47.25%	467	7.76%
1892	2,447	43.76%	2,385	42.65%	760	13.59%
1896	2,893	47.69%	2,994	49.36%	179	2.95%
1900	2,860	49.70%	2,727	47.38%	168	2.92%
1904	3,288	60.32%	1,988	36.47%	175	3.21%
1908	2,740	50.82%	2,418	44.84%	234	4.34%
1912	1,408	28.49%	1,960	39.66%	1,574	31.85%
1916	2,460	50.88%	2,297	47.51%	78	1.61%
1920	4,639	64.10%	2,437	33.67%	161	2.22%
1924	4,886	67.37%	2,037	28.09%	329	4.54%
1928	5,642	72.88%	2,075	26.81%	24	0.31%
1932	4,534	48.46%	4,684	50.06%	139	1.49%
1936	5,117	53.51%	4,117	43.05%	329	3.44%
1940	7,068	68.25%	3,254	31.42%	34	0.33%
1944	7,417	71.38%	2,910	28.01%	64	0.62%
1948	7,368	70.99%	2,813	27.10%	198	1.91%
1952	9,790	75.57%	3,086	23.82%	79	0.61%
1956	10,315	72.62%	3,845	27.07%	45	0.32%
1960	10,340	64.68%	5,608	35.08%	39	0.24%
1964	6,723	40.89%	9,698	58.99%	20	0.12%
1968	10,034	51.01%	7,052	35.85%	2,584	13.14%
1972	16,856	66.85%	7,634	30.28%	725	2.88%
1976	19,437	59.83%	12,415	38.22%	634	1.95%
1980	25,012	60.17%	12,626	30.37%	3,932	9.46%
1984	31,846	74.39%	10,720	25.04%	246	0.57%
1988	31,331	68.79%	13,749	30.19%	466	1.02%
1992	27,539	44.61%	17,851	28.92%	16,345	26.48%
1996	30,598	50.79%	22,517	37.38%	7,127	11.83%
2000	44,637	59.14%	28,780	38.13%	2,058	2.73%
2004	58,860	62.79%	33,991	36.26%	891	0.95%
2008	55,592	55.64%	42,349	42.39%	1,965	1.97%
2012	60,083	60.91%	37,216	37.73%	1,341	1.36%
2016	65,680	61.68%	34,384	32.29%	6,425	6.03%
2020	76,982	60.52%	48,220	37.91%	1,995	1.57%
2024	81,217	61.32%	49,503	37.38%	1,728	1.30%

United States Senate election results for Livingston County, Michigan1
Year	Republican		Democratic		Third party(ies)	
Year	No.	%	No.	%	No.	%
2024	78,193	59.57%	50,533	38.50%	2,526	1.92%

Michigan Gubernatorial election results for Livingston County
Year	Republican		Democratic		Third party(ies)	
Year	No.	%	No.	%	No.	%
2022	60,494	55.58%	46,524	42.75%	1,821	1.67%

=== County government ===
The county government operates the jail, maintains rural roads, operates the major local courts, records deeds, mortgages, and vital records, administers public health regulations, and participates with the state in the provision of social services. The county board of commissioners controls the budget and has limited authority to make laws or ordinances. In Michigan, most local government functions—police and fire, building and zoning, tax assessment, street maintenance, etc.—are the responsibility of individual cities and townships.

=== Elected officials ===
- Prosecuting Attorney: David Reader
- Sheriff: Michael Murphy
- County Clerk: Elizabeth Hundley
- County Treasurer: Jennifer Nash
- Register of Deeds: Brandon Denby
- Drain Commissioner: Brian Jonckheere

(information as of May 2019)

== Transportation ==
=== Major highways ===
- I-96 – runs ESE and SE through central part of county, passing Fowlerville, Howell, Brighton.
- BL I-96 – business loop through central Howell, parallel to and on the north side of I96. 7.6 miles (12.2 km) long.
- US 23 – runs north–south through eastern part of county, passing Hartland, Brighton, Whitmore Lake.
- M-36 - runs east and southeast through lower part of county, passing Pinckney and Hamburg, to intersection with US23 north of Whitmore Lake.
- M-59 – runs west from east county line to intersection with I96, 3.4 miles (5.5 km) WNW of Howell.
- M-106 – enters west line of county near SW corner. Runs east and NE to intersection with M36, 3 miles (4.8 km) inside county border.
- D-19 – runs south from Pinckney 2.3 miles (3.7 km) to intersection with N. Territorial Road.

== Communities ==
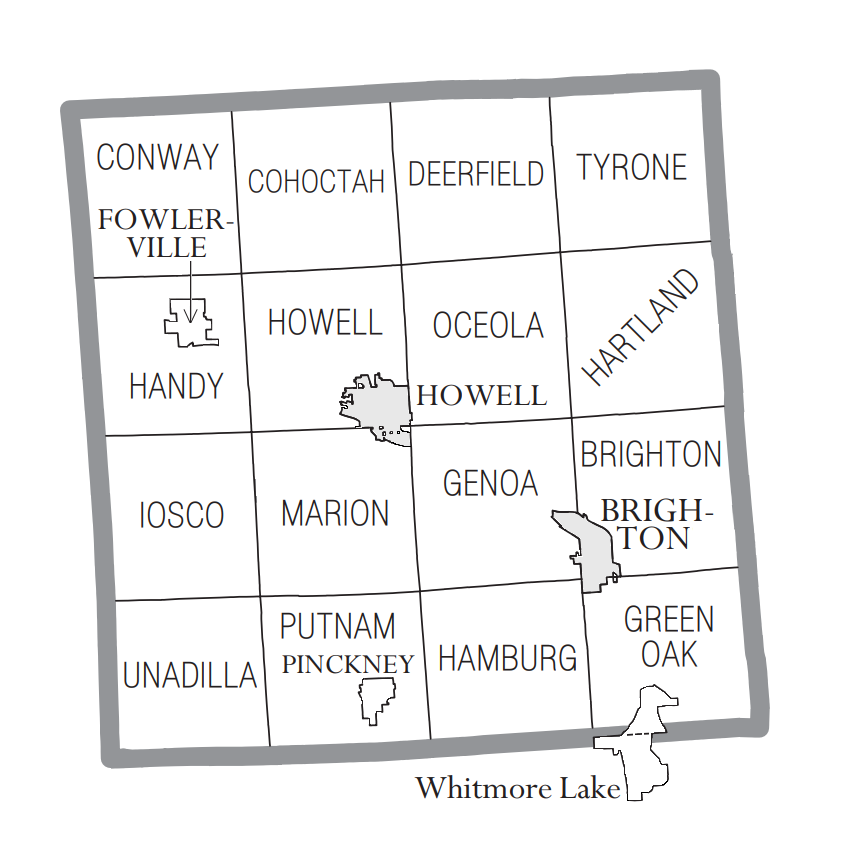
U.S. Census data map showing local municipal boundaries within Livingston County, as well as the Whitmore Lake CDP. Shaded areas represent incorporated cities.

=== Cities ===
- Brighton
- Fenton (partial)
- Howell (county seat)

=== Villages ===
- Fowlerville
- Pinckney

=== Charter townships ===
- Brighton Charter Township
- Genoa Charter Township
- Green Oak Charter Township

=== Civil townships ===
- Cohoctah Township
- Conway Township
- Deerfield Township
- Hamburg Township
- Handy Township
- Hartland Township
- Howell Township
- Iosco Township
- Marion Township
- Oceola Township
- Putnam Township
- Tyrone Township
- Unadilla Township

=== Census-designated places ===
- Hartland
- Whitmore Lake (partial)

=== Other unincorporated communities ===
- Anderson
- Bullis Crossing
- Chalkerville
- Chilson
- Cohoctah
- Cohoctah Center
- Deer Creek
- Deerfield Center
- Fleming
- Green Oak
- Gregory
- Hallers Corners
- Hamburg
- Hell
- Island Lake
- Kaiserville
- Kensington (former)
- Lakeland
- Nicholson (partial)
- Oak Grove
- Parkers Corners
- Parshallville
- Plainfield
- Pettysville
- Rushton
- Tyrone Center
- Unadilla
- Williamsville

== Education ==
School districts include:

- Brighton Area Schools
- Byron Area Schools
- Dexter Community School District
- Fenton Area Public Schools
- Fowlerville Community Schools
- Hartland Consolidated Schools
- Howell Public Schools
- Huron Valley Schools
- Linden Community Schools
- Morrice Area Schools
- Pinckney Community Schools
- South Lyon Community Schools
- Stockbridge Community Schools
- Webberville Community Schools
- Whitmore Lake Public Schools

== See also ==
- List of Michigan State Historic Sites in Livingston County
- National Register of Historic Places listings in Livingston County, Michigan
