= Alonzo W. Olds House =

- U.S. National Register of Historic Places
- Michigan State Historic Site
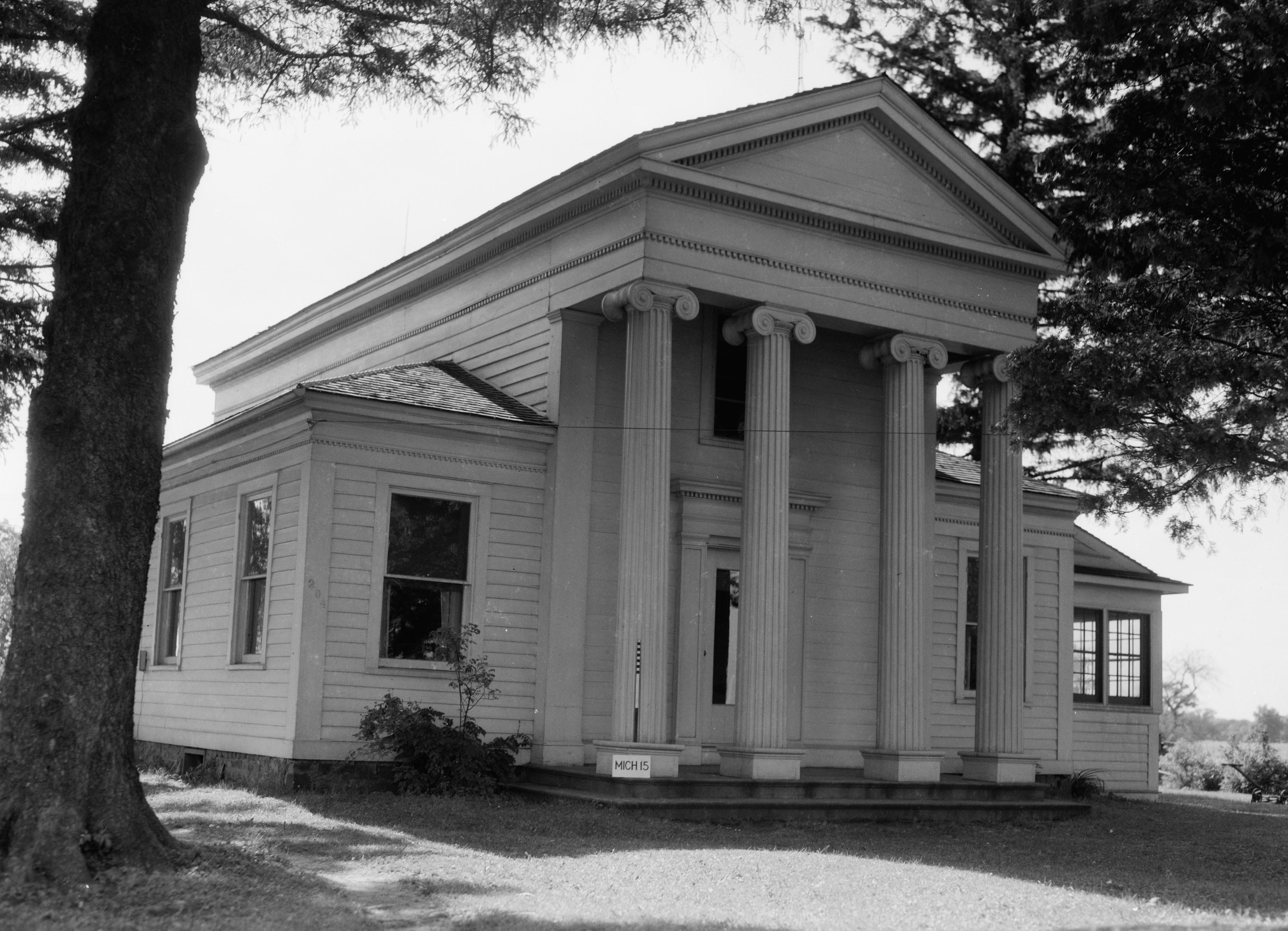
- Interactive map
- Location: 10084 Rushton Rd., Rushton, Michigan
- Coordinates: 42°27′28″N 83°41′49″W
- Area: less than one acre
- Built: 1848
- Architectural style: Greek Revival
- NRHP reference No.: 72000636
- Added to NRHP: May 5, 1972

The Alonzo W. Olds House, also known as the Albert Read House, is a single family home located at 10084 Rushton Road in Rushton, Michigan. It was listed on the National Register of Historic Places in 1972.

== History ==
Alonzo W. Olds emigrated from New York state to Michigan in 1833, where he purchased 40 acres of farmland. In 1835, he purchased an additional 80 acres, including the site of this house. He built this Greek Revival home in 1848-49. Olds raised sheep on the property, and constructed a sawmill; by 1850, he owned 440 acres. In 1851, Olds sold his farmstead to Warren Clark, and moved on to build up another extensive farmstead nearby. Clark farmed the land until 1863, when he sold it to William Read.

William Read died in 1888, passing the house and farm on to his wife Mary. When she died in 1900, their son Albert purchased the farm. He farmed the land until his death, when it was passed on to his son, Albert Jr. He farmed the land until his death in 1975, after which his wife Harriet lived in the house. In the early 1980s, much of the farmland was used to develop the Centennial Farms Adult Community. Harriet Read continued to live in the house until her own death in 1992.

== Description ==
The Alonzo W. Olds House is a handsome, classical Greek Revival house, formally composed with a narrow two-story central section fronted with a tetra-style Ionic portico, and symmetric one-story wings with hipped roofs to each side. It is a frame house, with flush siding under the portico and clapboard covering the rest of the building. The portico is supported with fluted columns, and the main cornice and the cornice over the entrance have a dentil course; the architrave of the portico and the wings have similar dentilation. The corner boards on the wings are wide to match the portico.

The wings were once topped with symmetrical parapets, but these were removed in the early 1920s. The original wood shingles on the roof were replaced with asphalt roofing after a fire on the roof in 1939 or 1940. A kitchen and family room wing has been added to the rear of the house, as well as a garage.

== See also ==
- National Register of Historic Places listings in Livingston County, Michigan
