= John H. and Martha Durfee Galloway House =

- U.S. National Register of Historic Places
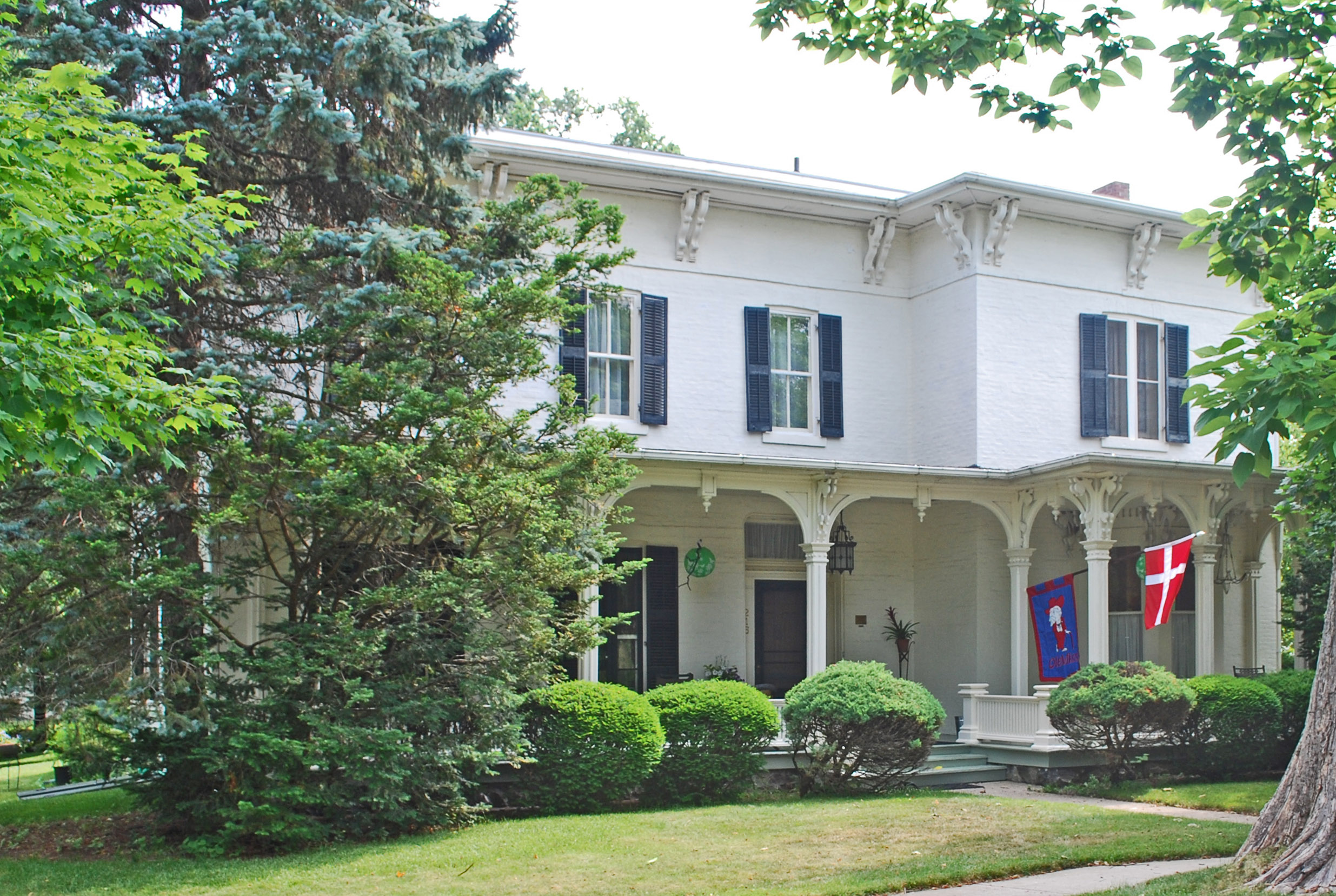
- Interactive map
- Location: 216 Higgins St., Howell, Michigan
- Coordinates: 42°36′33″N 83°55′35″W
- Area: less than one acre
- Architectural style: Italianate
- NRHP reference No.: 06001030
- Added to NRHP: November 15, 2006

The John H. and Martha Durfee Galloway House is a single-family home located at 216 Higgins Street in Howell, Michigan. It was listed on the National Register of Historic Places in 2006.

== History ==
John H. Galloway was born in Gorham, New York in 1817. He arrived in Howell in 1844 with his wife Delia Ann Brown Galloway and their two-year-old son Frederick. There, Galloway and his brother-in-law, Nathan Hickey, established the first foundry in the area, manufacturing stoves and agricultural implements. Delia Galloway died in 1845, and in 1848 John married Martha Durfee; the couple later had two sons, James and Elias. The couple built this house, likely in the early 1850s.

In about 1854 Galloway sold his interest in the foundry. He continued in business, buying part-ownership in another foundry. He served as a county supervisor in 1858-60, served one term in the Michigan Senate in 1861, and served as Howell village assessor from 1863 to 1865. He was also president of the village in 1879. John and Martha lived in their house until Martha's death in 1889 and John's in 1892. As John's sons Frederick and James had predeceased him, the estate was divided among Elias Galloway and Frederick's sons Frederick R. and James R. Galloway. Elias Galloway took up residence in his parents’ house, but much of his time elsewhere. He died in 1918, and his widow Elizabeth McMichael Galloway lived in the house until her death in 1936.

With Elizabeth's death, the house went to James R. Galloway (his brother Frederick R. died unmarried in 1915). James sold the house in 1937 to Dr. and Mrs. Duncan C. Stephens in 1937. In 1946, the house was sold to Herbie and Doris Sneed, who immediately sold it to Herbert and Alice Schott. The Schotts sold it to John and Alice Stritzinger in 1977; they lived in the house at least until 2006.

== Description ==
The Galloway House is an asymmetrical two-story Italianate brick structure with a low hip roof having widely overhanging eaves supported by paired brackets. A single-story wing projects from the rear. A full-width, flat-roofed porch runs across the front elevation, sheltering an entry flanked with pilasters, with a transom above. The house has one-over-one and two-over-two windows with low segmental-arch heads, along with a large bay window.

== See also ==
- National Register of Historic Places listings in Livingston County, Michigan
