= Timothy and Lucretia Jones Warner Homestead =

Archaeological site in Michigan, United States

- U.S. National Register of Historic Places
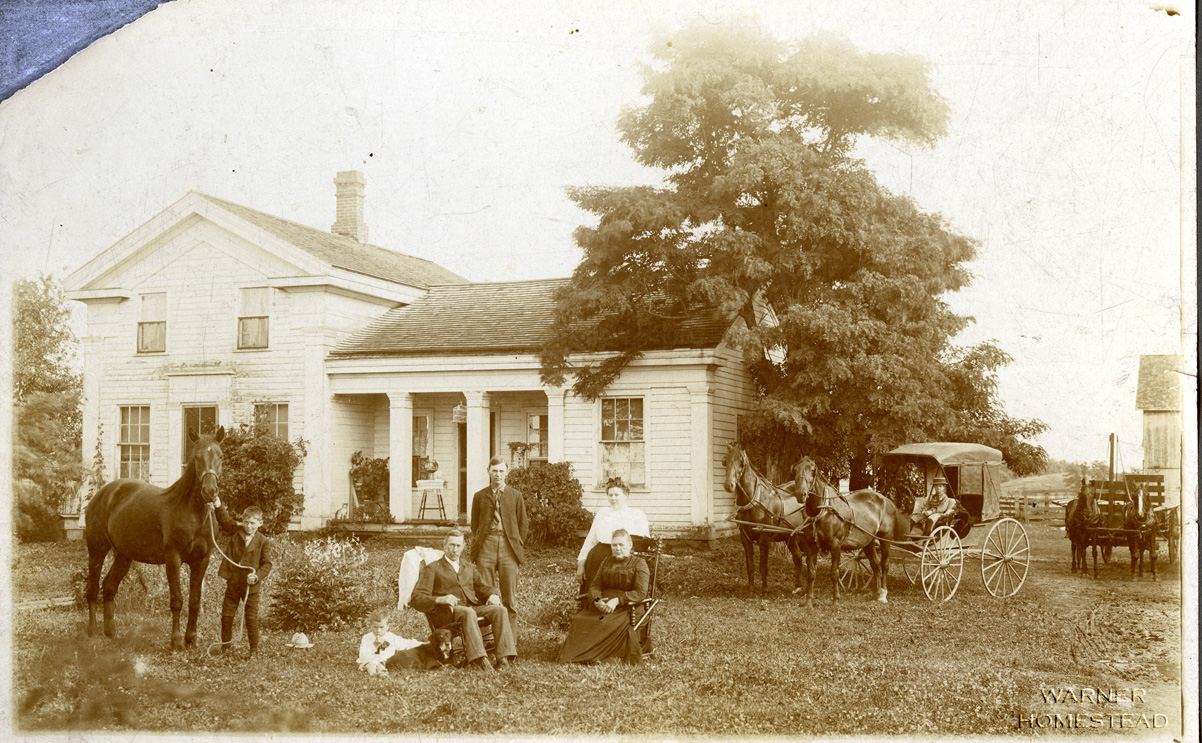
- Interactive map
- Location: 4001 Pleasant Valley Rd., Brighton, Michigan
- Coordinates: 42°32′45″N 83°42′51″W
- Area: 2 acres (0.81 ha)
- Built: 1841
- Architectural style: Greek Revival
- NRHP reference No.: 11000635
- Added to NRHP: September 8, 2011

The Timothy and Lucretia Jones Warner Homestead is a farmstead and archaeological site (the Warner Site, designated 20LV334) located at 4001 Pleasant Valley Road near Brighton, Michigan.

== History ==
Timothy Warner was born in 1819 in Livonia, New York, and came with his parents to Brighton Township from in 1837 as a pioneer. However, the Panic of 1837 made it difficult profitably purchase farmland, and Warner began by farming land on shares. However, in 1841, he purchased 80 acres of land at this site. Although it had been owned by a number of speculators previously, the land was undeveloped at the time. He constructed a log cabin and several barns. In 1846, Timothy married Lucretia Jones of South Lyon and started a family. In 1855, the couple built the Greek Revival home that is still located on the farmstead. The Warner farm was successful, and by 1859 the Warners owned 240 acres, and later owned nearly 600 acres.

In 1900, Timothy's son George inherited the farm, and in 1920 George's son Herbert purchased it. Herbert added more structures to the farmstead, including a new barn and well house. The farm continued to run self-sufficiently until 1962, when Herbert decided to retire. In 1980, Herbert's son Leroy inherited the homestead and the surrounding 18 acres, with other portions of the original claim being subdivided. All of the older outbuildings were removed in 2002. Substantial restoration work on the house began in 2015.

== Description ==
Although at one time a number of structures were located on the Warner Homestead, the only remaining original structure is the 1855 farmhouse. The house is a Greek Revival Upright and Wing structure, consisting of a two-story gable front upright along with a single story lateral wing on a foundation of mortared fieldstone. An architrave and frieze topped with cornice runs around all sides. The house is clad with lapped siding terminating in cornerboards. The main door is located in the center of the gable-front section, and is flanked with piers and topped with an entablature. A recessed porch runs across the front of the wing, between the upright section and a projecting room at the opposite end. A second recessed porch is located in the rear.

The relocated Hicks schoolhouse also stands on the property. It is an 1849 schoolhouse which originally was located at the corner of M-36 and Farley Road near Pinckney, Michigan. It is a wood-framed Greek Revival one-room schoolhouse. The school served students in its original location until 1972, and was moved to the current location in 2016.

== Archaeology ==
The Warner Homestead has been designated an archaeological site, known as the Warner Site or 20LV334. Archaeological digs began on the site in 2007. Subsequent excavation uncovered 21 documented archaeological features, and the recovery of thousands of artifacts. These are primarily privies and trash pits with late nineteenth and early twentieth century household artifacts.

== See also ==
- National Register of Historic Places listings in Livingston County, Michigan
