= Western House (Brighton, Michigan) =

- U.S. National Register of Historic Places
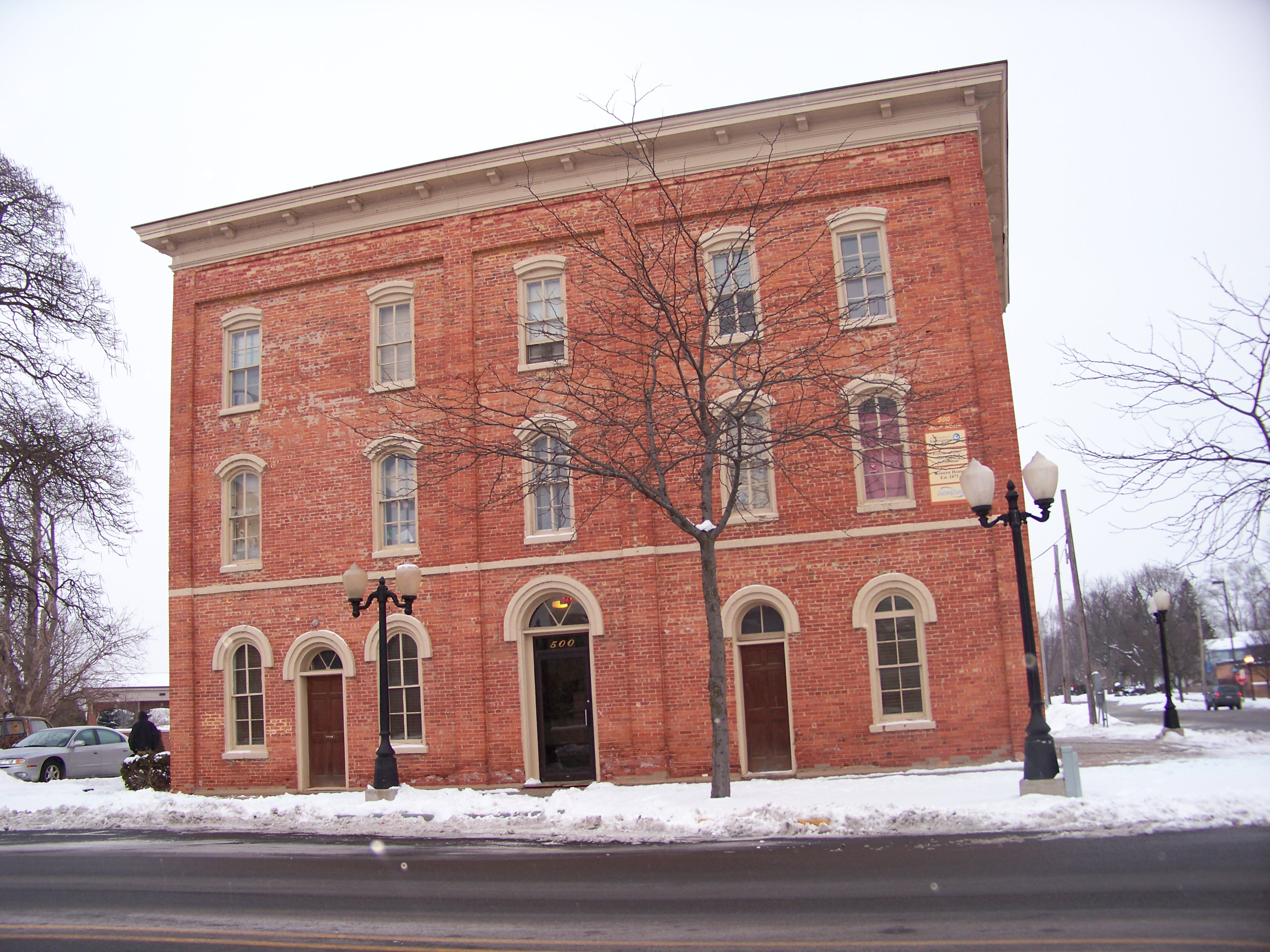
- Interactive map
- Location: 500 W. Main St., Brighton, Michigan
- Coordinates: 42°31′46″N 83°47′08″W
- Area: less than one acre
- Built: 1873
- Architectural style: Italianate
- NRHP reference No.: 86000806
- Added to NRHP: April 17, 1986

The Western House, also known as the Brighton Hotel, is a former hotel and boarding house at 500 West Main Street in Brighton, Michigan. It was listed on the National Register of Historic Places in 1986. The building now houses the Brewery Becker.

== History ==
Brighton was first settled in 1832, and became an established stagecoach stop and market center for southeastern Livingston County. In 1871, the Detroit, Lansing and Northern Railroad constructed a line through Brighton, which brought an economic boom to the city. To take advantage of the transient population brought by the railroad, Asa Rounsifer constructed the building in 1873 as a hotel near the depot. Rounsifer was a Dutch immigrant and local farmer. Possibly due to the Panic of 1873, the Rounsifer family suffered financial setbacks and in 1874 sold the hotel to Johannah and A.W. Smith, who renamed it the Western House and added a livery stable to the property. A few years later the hotel was purchased by Joseph B. Skilbeck, an English boot and shoe manufacturer.

The hotel was later purchased by Sarah and LeRoy King and was a financial success as a hotel, restaurant, and social center for parties, until Brighton decided to go dry in 1908. The Western House remained in business as a boarding house with an occasional restaurant, although the halting of rail passenger service in 1948 reduced its customer base. In later years it was a bar and rooming house. In 1985, the building was rehabilitated to provide office space on the ground level and rooms for rent on the upper floors. In 2011, plans began to refurbish the building into a microbrewery. The Brewery Becker opened in 2014.

== Description ==
The Western House is a three-story roughly cubical Italianate brick structure standing on a corner lot. It has a high degree of architectural integrity for a building from this time period, maintaining a simple cornice, and the original arrangement of doors and windows in the main facades. Pilasters run up the corners and frame the central bay of the five-bay wide front facade, and a belt course separates the first and second floors. The windows are symmetrically placed, with fully arched windows on the first floor, segmentally arched windows on the second floor, and rectangular windows on the third. The doors have fanlights above.

== See also ==
- National Register of Historic Places listings in Livingston County, Michigan
