= St. Augustine Catholic Church and Cemetery (Hartland, Michigan) =

Historic church in Michigan, United States

- U.S. National Register of Historic Places
- U.S. Historic district
- Michigan State Historic Site
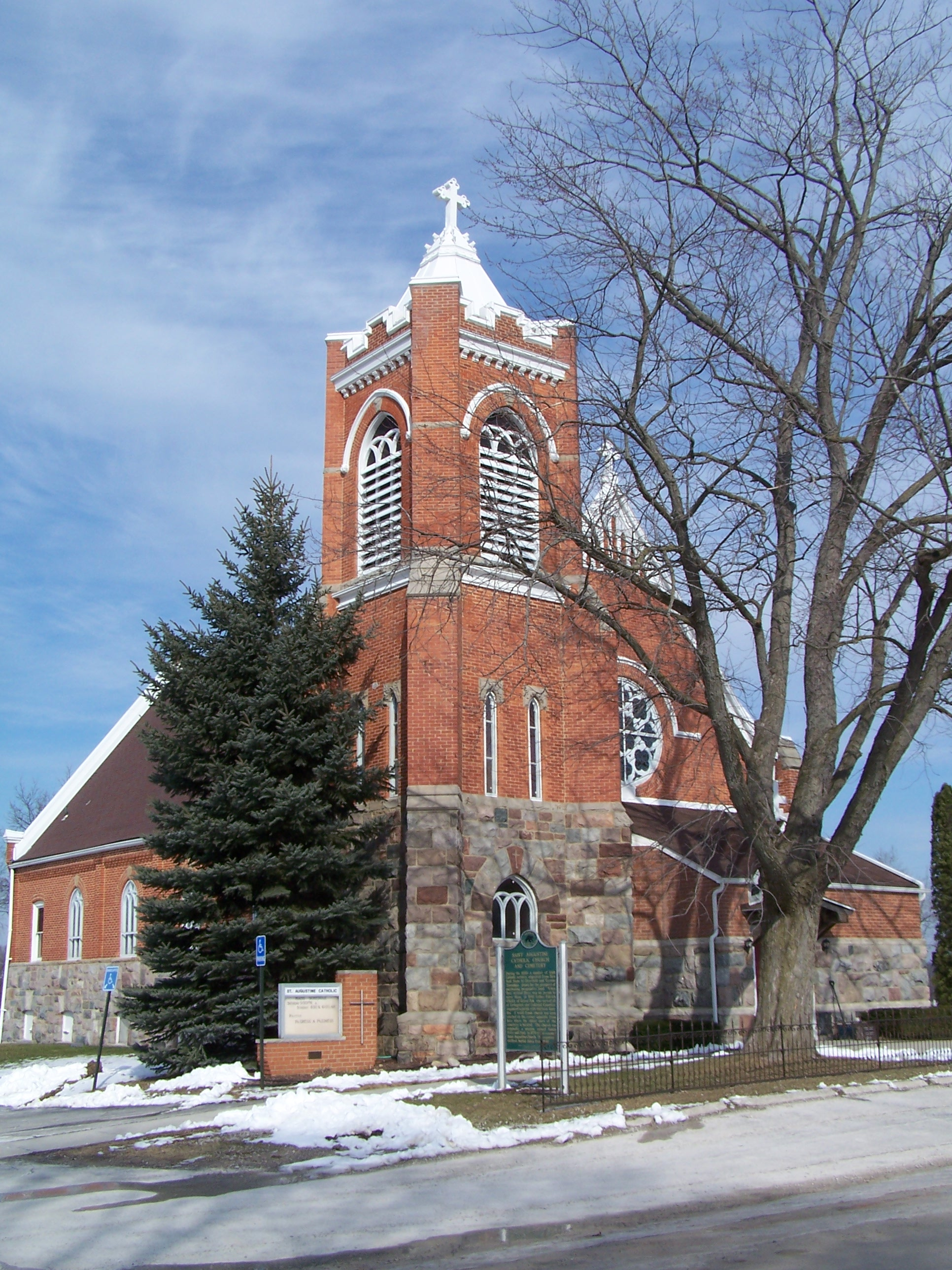

- Location within Michigan Location within the United States
- Interactive map
- Location: 6481 Faussett Rd; Howell, Michigan, Michigan 48855
- Coordinates: 42°42′21″N 83°49′20″W
- Area: 5 acres (2.0 ha)
- Built: 1843
- Architect: Harry J. Rill
- Architectural style: Gothic style
- NRHP reference No.: 96000802
- Added to NRHP: July 25, 1996

St. Augustine Catholic Church and Cemetery is a historic site in Hartland, Michigan. It is associated with Fr. Patrick O’Kelly, a missionary priest who was active in Southeastern Michigan. The church was built in 1843 and added to the National Register in 1996.

== History ==
The first settlers in this part of Livingston County arrived in the early 1830s. Many of these early settlers were Catholic, and in 1843 the Rev. Patrick O'Kelly established the Saints Peter and Paul parish, which is now St. Augustine Church. Kelly was born near Kilkenny, Ireland in 1802 and came to America in 1821. He came to Detroit in 1829 and served various parishes around the diocese before being appointed as pastor of Oakland and Livingston counties in 1843 and founding St. Augustine.

In 1843, Kelly purchased two acres near this site for a church and cemetery. A frame church was constructed in 1846. In 1857, the parish purchased two acres of adjacent land and built a rectory. About 1870 the church changed its name to the current St. Augustine. In the early 1890s, Father George J. Maurer oversaw the construction of the present church, which was completed in 1895. He hired architect Harry J. Rill of Detroit to design the building. After completion of the new church, the old frame structure was demolished. In 2018, the church congregation celebrated its 175th anniversary, and is still using the 1895 building.

== Description ==
The Saint Augustine Church is a rectangular red brick Gothic Revival building on a high foundation of random ashlar, which extends to the base of the windows. Window sills and caps, keystones, and beltcourses are made of yellow Berea sandstone. There is a square tower at one corner of the front facade; the ashlar extends further up this tower. The opposite corner of the facade contains a slightly projecting end bay with a side-facing gable at the top, creating some visual balance to the tower. It has a high gable roof with a large round window in the facade gable, below a pointed-arch tracery pattern at the top of the gable. The side walls have four pointed-arch windows on either side, separated by piers. Cornices, Gothic "tracery" treatment in the front gable, and hood moldings are made of galvanized iron.

A vestibule containing the entry, added in 1963, projects from beneath the round window. Inside, the vestibule area contains staircases leading to the basement, and access to the original front entrance, through which a small lobby opens into the nave. A small passage leads to the tower, which contains stair up to the choir level. The nave is rectangular in form, except for a shallow, space in the center of the far end which contains the main altar. To either side of this space are square rooms containing the sacristies.

Around the church are two plots of land containing cemeteries. A smaller plot, where the original frame church was constructed, contains the "old" cemetery> A larger plot, near the present church, contains the "new" cemetery, with graves dating from the 1910s.

== See also ==
- National Register of Historic Places listings in Livingston County, Michigan
