= Jacob Fishbeck Farmstead =

- U.S. National Register of Historic Places
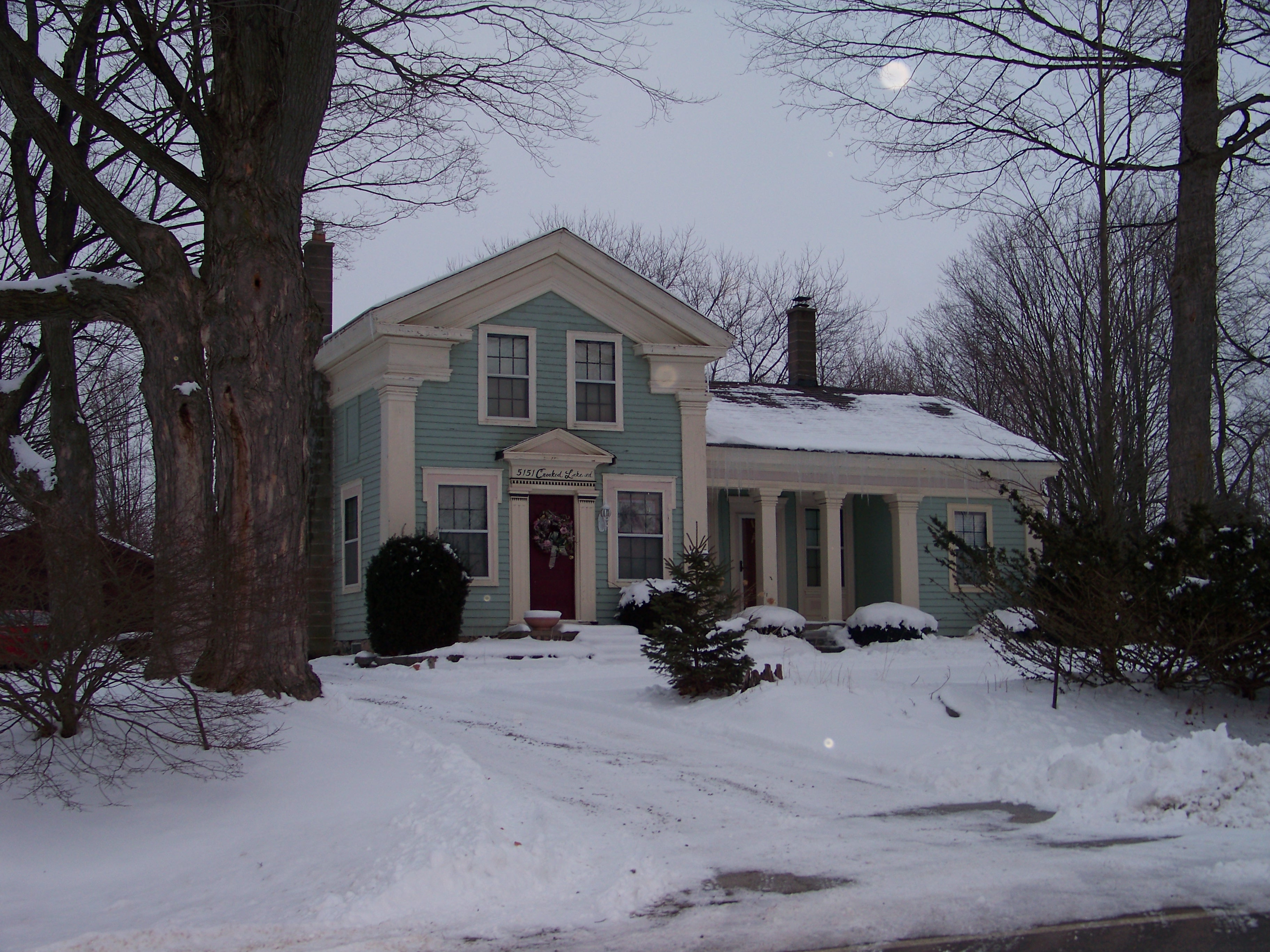
- Interactive map
- Location: 5151 Crooked Lake Rd., Genoa Township, Michigan
- Coordinates: 42°33′28″N 83°51′03″W
- Area: 5 acres (2.0 ha)
- Built: 1853
- Built by: David B. Pierce
- Architectural style: Greek Revival
- NRHP reference No.: 03000178
- Added to NRHP: April 2, 2003

The Jacob Fishbeck Farmstead is a farm located at 5151 Crooked Lake Road in Genoa Township, Michigan. It was listed on the National Register of Historic Places in 2003.

== History ==
In 1836, Jacob Fishbeck Sr. moved from St. Lawrence County, New York to Michigan, following his son Freeman, who had moved the previous year. They were soon joined by the remainder of Jacob Sr.'s children: Jacob Jr., Nicholas, Philip, Levi, and Elsey, and Isabella. The family constructed a house on this property and began farming; however, Jacob Sr. died in 1839, leaving the farm to his son Jacob Jr. The younger Jacob Fishbeck and his wife Aeroea continued to farm the land, eventually having three children. Aeroea Fishbeck died in the early 1850s, and in 1853 Jacob Fishbeck married Sarah A. Rodgers; the couple eventually had two children in addition to Jacob's three. Also in 1853, Jacob constructed the current house on the property. Although the builder of the house is not certain, it was likely constructed by family friend and local carpenter David Pierce.

Jacob Fishbeck Jr. farmed the property until 1868 when he sold it to William R. Geer. In 1870 it was sold again to Peter T. Gill, who lived on the property until 1883, when he sold the farm to John Milet and his sons John Milet Jr. and Thomas Milet. In 1887 John Milet Jr. bought out his father and brother. John Milet Jr. married Catherine Stafford, and the couple eventually had five children: Mary E., John H., Frank, Anna, and Walter. John Milet Jr. died in 1912, after which his estate was divided among his wife and children, all of whom were living at home at the time. His eldest son John H. Milet assumed operation of the farm along with his mother, and continued operating it through her death in 1942 and his in 1958. After this Anna ran the farm until her death in 1975, after which three of her nieces inherited the property. They subdivided the property, but left the farmstead intact. The farmstead was sold to first to Eugene Montague, and then in 1995 to Alan and Amelia Gliese.

== Description ==
The Jacob Fishbeck farmstead complex includes an 1853 farmhouse, a small barn, privy, garage, and chicken coop. The house is a Greek Revival example of the Upright and Wing house, consisting of a 1-1/2 story upright with a one-story side wing and a rear addition. The house is clad with weatherboard, and sits on a stone foundation. It has a wide roof cornice and several porches, including a porch fronting the wing which is supported by square Tuscan columns. The windows in the house are double hung, predominately six-over-six units. The main door is located at the center of the upright, and has an elaborate surround with pilasters to the side and a pediment above. A second door in the wing section provides access through the porch, and two more doors are located on the sides.

The barn is a small gambrel roof structure, likely constructed about 1885. A shed roof addition runs along one side. The foundation is a mixture of stone and concrete, and the barn is clad with a variety of materials, including board and batten siding and flush vertical boarding. The remaining structures, including the privy, garage and chicken coop, are located in a cluster; these buildings likely date from the early 20th century. The privy is a small rectilinear building with a shed roof clad with clapboard siding with a hinged door. The garage is a rectilinear structure with a gable roof and a shed roof addition. The chicken coop is a simple shed roof structure with two doors and a row of windows.

== See also ==
- National Register of Historic Places listings in Livingston County, Michigan
