= Frank J. Hecox House =

- U.S. National Register of Historic Places
- Michigan State Historic Site
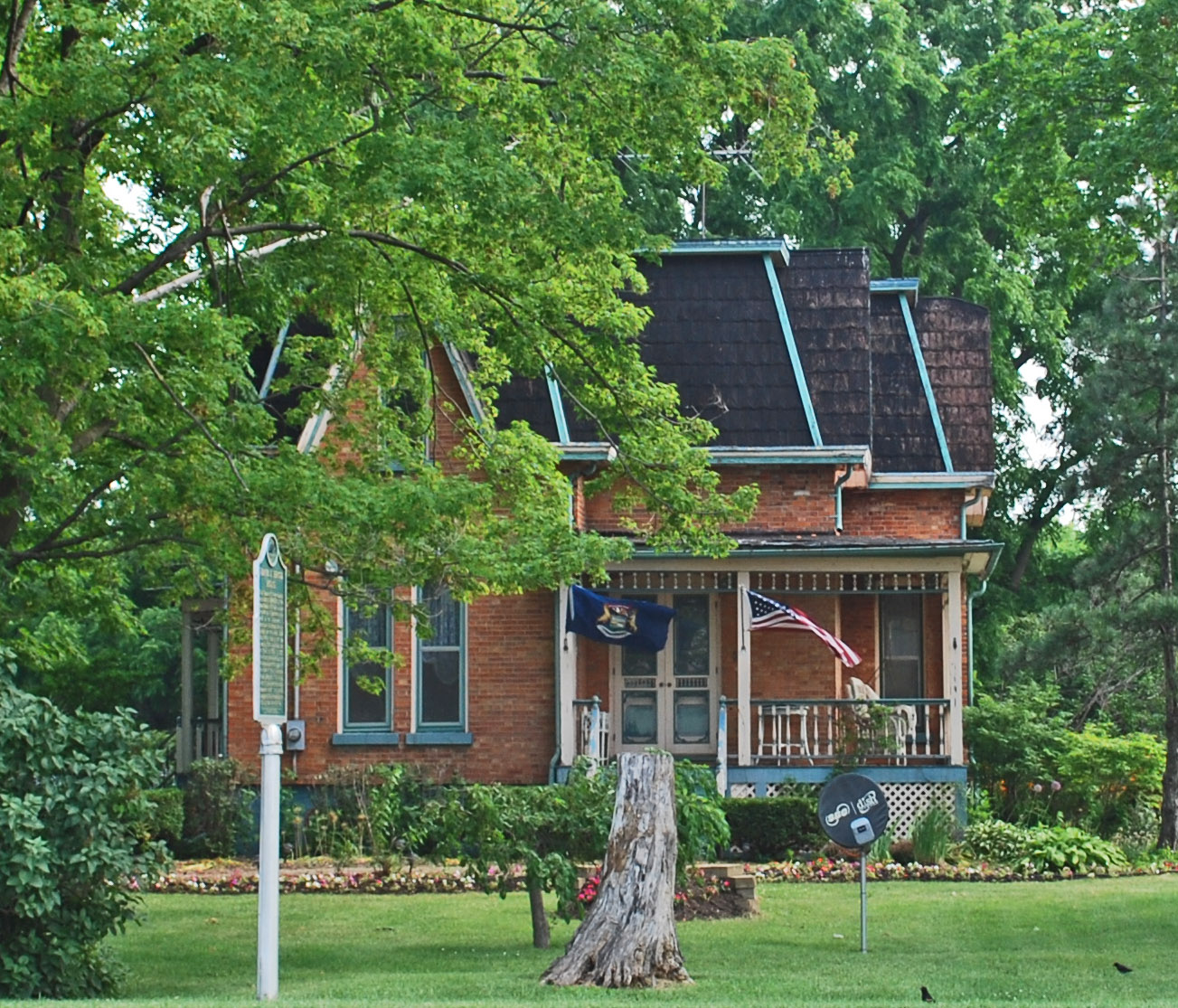
- Interactive map
- Location: 3720 W. Grand River, Howell, Michigan
- Coordinates: 42°37′43″N 83°59′14″W
- Area: 1 acre (0.40 ha)
- Built: 1887
- Architectural style: Second Empire
- NRHP reference No.: 94000745
- Added to NRHP: July 22, 1994

The Frank J. Hecox House, also known as the House of the Seven Gables, is a single-family home located at 3720 West Grand River Avenue near Howell, Michigan. It was listed on the National Register of Historic Places in 1994. It is a rare example of Second Empire architecture in the region.

== History ==
Very little is known of Frank J. Hecox and his wife Ada save that they were farmers. In 1886, the couple bought the 76-acre farm that this house is located on. It is likely that the farm at the time had a house located at the site of the present house. In 1887, Hecox constructed this new house. It is also unknown how long the Hecoxes live on the farm, although it is likely they remained until the latter part of the 1890s. Certainly by 1900 the farm was being rented, and in 1907 Ada Hecox, then living in San Jose, California, sold the farm. The farm remained a rental property until 1922, when it was purchased by Fred A. and Cora A. Smith. Fred and Cora Smith died in the 1950s, and the farm was passed to their family, eventually being sold in the early 1970s.

The house was once again turned into a rental property, and was used by the Camelot Exploration Company, an oil company, as offices. In 1982 it was purchased and restored by a private owner.

== Description ==
The Frank J. Hecox House is a two-story brick Second Empire house on a raised basement. It has a metal-clad mansard roof with seven gables, one in the front and three on each side. The front elevation has paired arched Italianate windows below the steeply pitched gable. The double-door entry is sheltered by a wooden porch. Another porch is on the side. Windows are one-over-one double sash units with Italianate segmental arch tops and simple surrounds. An enclosed porch addition is at the rear.

On the interior, the first floor contains a front entrance hall, parlor, a large reception room, two bedrooms, a dining room, and the original kitchen with built-in cupboards. A cast iron corner fireplace is located in the parlor. A large open front stair and smaller enclosed rear stair lead to the upper floor. The upper floor contains two rear bedrooms, two front bedrooms, and a bath. A full brick basement is partitioned into several rooms.

== See also ==
- National Register of Historic Places listings in Livingston County, Michigan
