= Bingham House =

- U.S. National Register of Historic Places
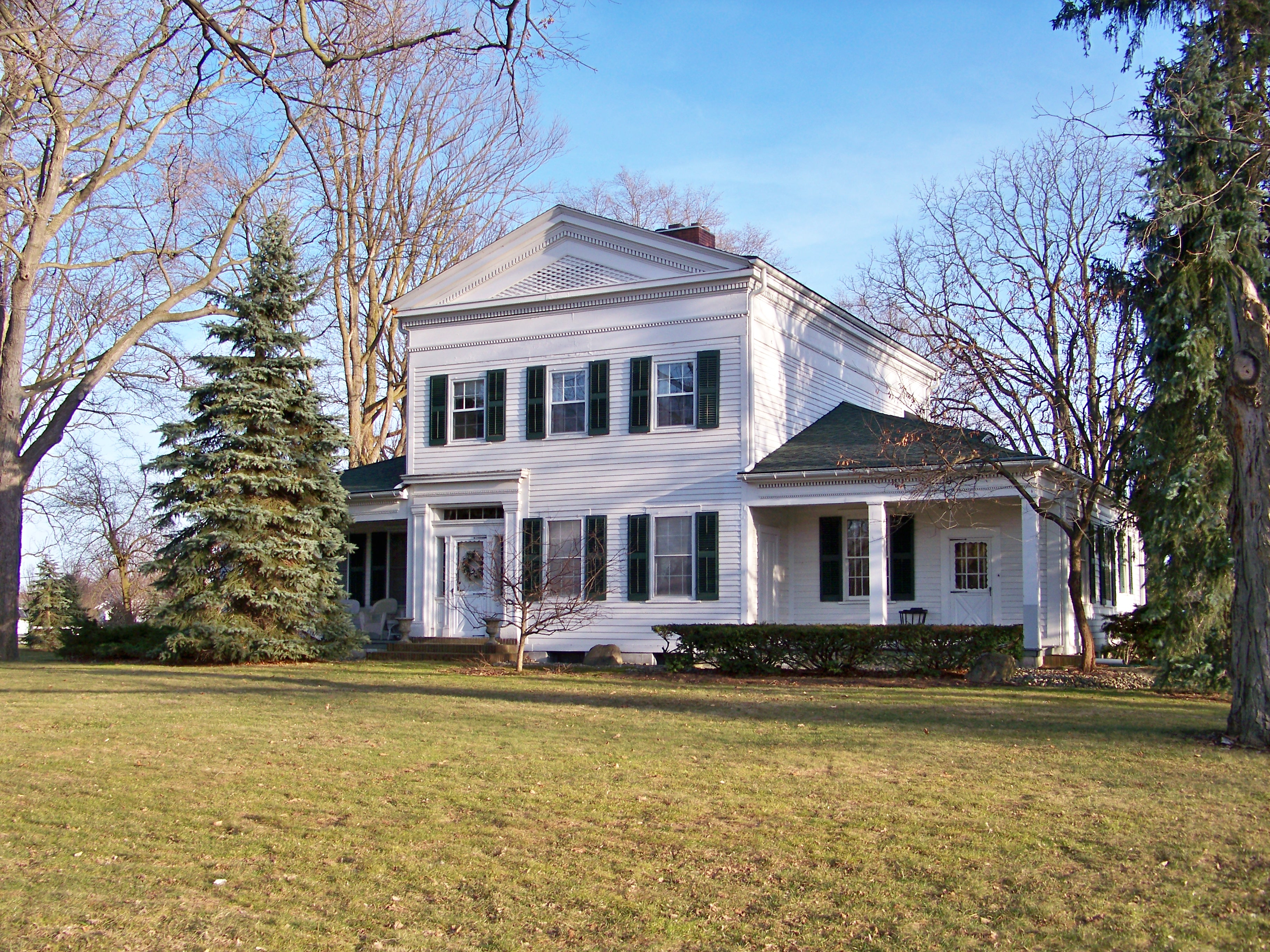
- Interactive map
- Location: 13270 Silver Lake Rd., Brighton, Michigan
- Coordinates: 42°29′50″N 83°41′01″W
- Area: Less than one acre
- Built: 1841
- Architectural style: Greek Revival
- NRHP reference No.: 72000635
- Added to NRHP: October 18, 1972

The Bingham House is a single-family home located at 13270 Silver Lake Road in Brighton, Michigan. It was listed on the National Register of Historic Places in 1972.

== History ==
Kinsley S. Bingham was born in Onondaga County, New York, in 1808. In his younger years, he studied law, but practiced farming. In 1833, he married and moved to Michigan, moving into a double log cabin with his wife's brother. Unfortunately, Bingham's wife died giving birth to a son, and the boy was sent back to New York to be raised by his grandparents. Bingham began a political career in Michigan, serving as postmaster, justice of the peace, captain of militia, and, in 1836, as the county's first probate judge. In 1837 he was elected to the Michigan State House of Representatives, eventually becoming Speaker. In 1839, he married his first wife's sister. As his new family grew, Bingham made plans to move out of the old double log cabin. He had this frame house constructed in 1841, and the family likely moved in the following year.

In 1847, Bingham was elected to the United States Congress, and in 1854 was nominated by the nascent Republican Party as their first Michigan gubernatorial candidate. He served two terms as governor, then in 1859 was elected to the United States Senate. He died in 1861 at home, and was buried behind the house near his wife. The graves were moved to a public cemetery later.

== Description ==
The Bingham House is one of the oldest and finest Greek Revival buildings in Michigan. It is a two-story timber frame structure, with a rectangular central section flanked by single story side wings in a modified "basilica" style. The house has a lattice work tympanum, a massive entablature over the doorway, and dentilated cornices. The windows are six over six units, and the entrance is flanked by sidelights and topped with a transom. The house was later modified with a portico located at the rear, and the porches of the wings were screened in.

== See also ==
- National Register of Historic Places listings in Livingston County, Michigan
