= August Westphal Farmstead =

- U.S. National Register of Historic Places
- Michigan State Historic Site
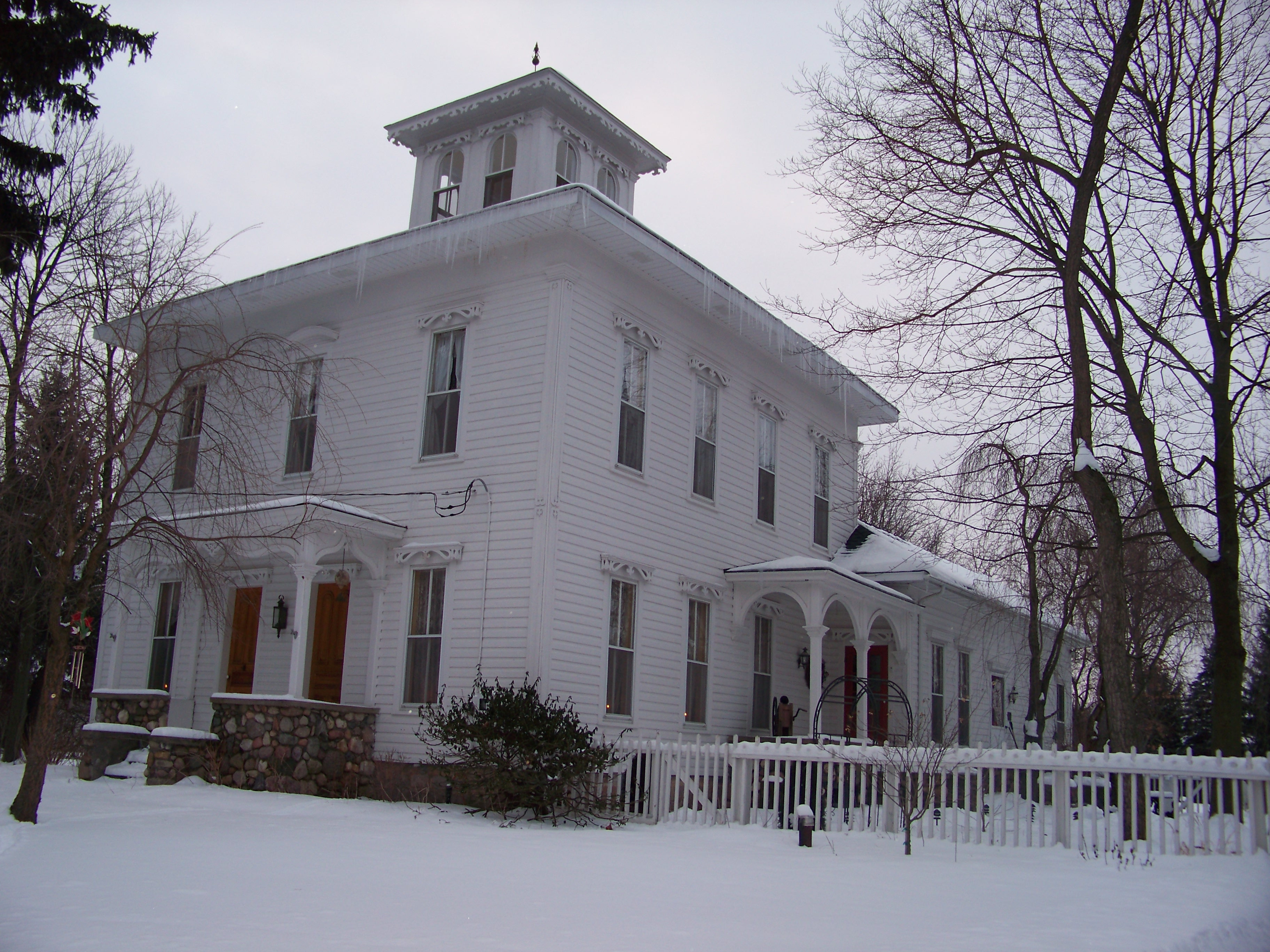

- Location within Michigan Location within the United States
- Interactive map
- Location: 6430 Brighton Rd., Brighton, Michigan
- Coordinates: 42°31′39″N 83°49′27″W
- Area: 4.2 acres (1.7 ha)
- Built: 1868
- Built by: Christopher Blackburn
- Architectural style: Italianate
- NRHP reference No.: 85002151
- Added to NRHP: September 12, 1985

The August Westphal Farmstead is a group of farm buildings located at 6430 Brighton Road near Brighton, Michigan. It was listed on the National Register of Historic Places in 1985.

== History ==
August Westphal was born in 1833 in Germany, and arrived in this area with his parents in 1844. In 1853 he purchased the first 80 acres of this farmstead, and in 1855 he married Friederike Wilhelmine Christiane Grundmann. The couple eventually had nine children. They originally lived in a small frame house located northwest of the present farmhouse. In 1868 they built a large barn on the farm, and in 1875 constructed the Italianate farmhouse. The farm prospered, and Westphal eventually owned 205 acres.

In 1916, the Westphals retired and moved to another house, selling the farm to Conrad Seim, another German immigrant. The Seim family farmed the property until 1967, when the land was sold to a developer. The farmhouse and surrounding buildings remain on a four-acre parcel.

== Description ==
The August Westphal Farmstead contains a large farmhouse, two barns, a corn crib and wagon shed, chicken coop, smokehouse, privy, and water-shed, all located in a cluster. The farmhouse is a two-story vernacular Italianate structure with two single-story additions. The house sits on a fieldstone foundation, and is sided with clapboard. The front entrance is through a porch, and includes the unusual arrangement of two separate, arched doors, side by side, with one opening into the parlor and one into the living room. The house is topped with a belvedere. Sawn-wood ornamentation decorates the porches, belvedere, bay window, and the window hoods.

The interior of the house is unusually ornate for a farmhouse, and includes plaster cornices and ceiling medallions, as well as false fireplaces in the living room and dining room with decorative wooden mantels.

== See also ==
- National Register of Historic Places listings in Livingston County, Michigan
