= George Louk Farm =

- U.S. National Register of Historic Places
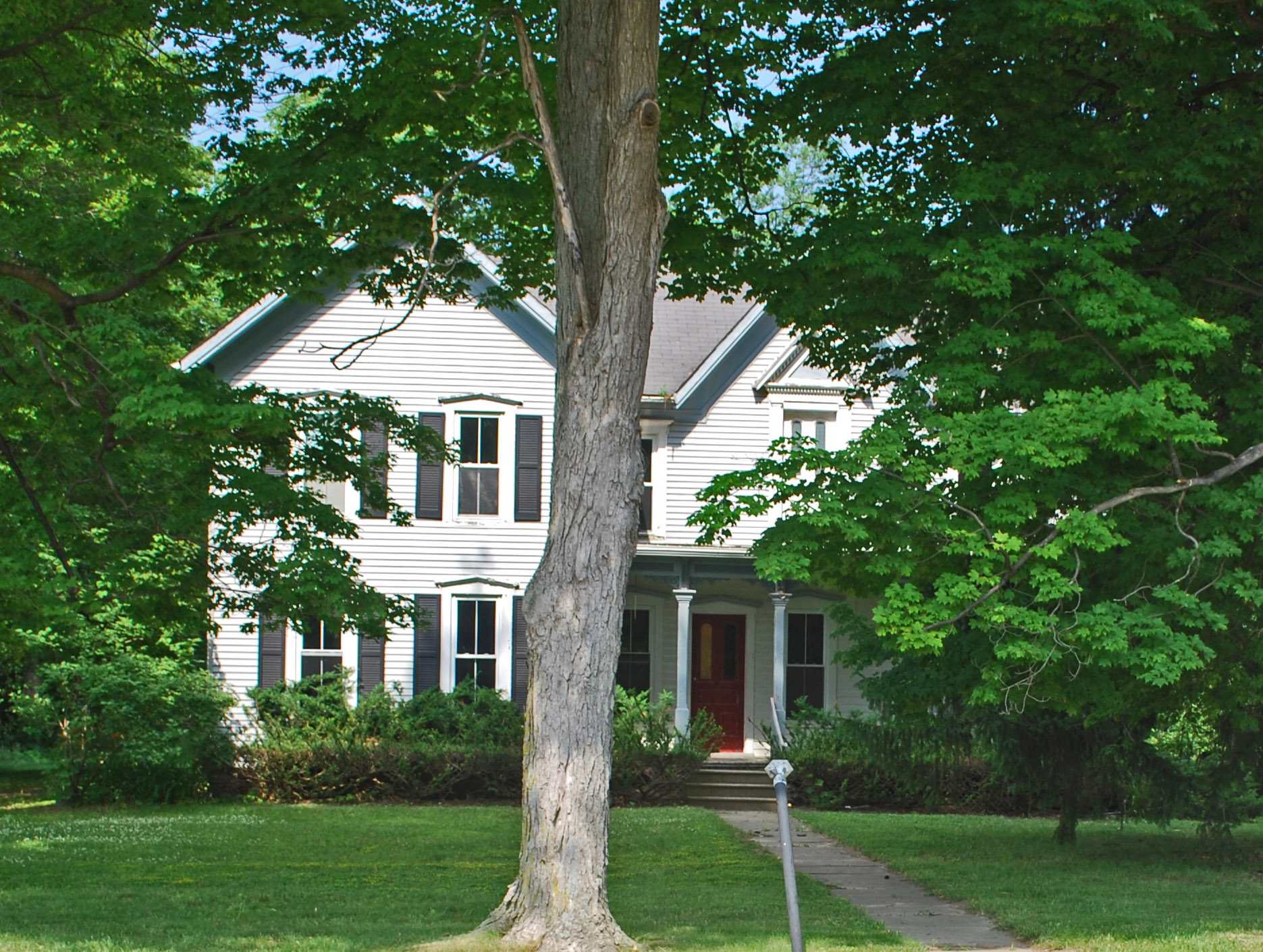

- Location within Michigan Location within the United States
- Interactive map
- Location: 1885 Tooley Rd., Howell, Michigan
- Coordinates: 42°36′35″N 83°55′58″W
- Area: 25 acres (10 ha)
- Built: c. 1873
- Architectural style: Italianate, Board and Batten Outbuilding
- NRHP reference No.: 95000285
- Added to NRHP: June 15, 1995

The George Louk Farm is a rural farmstead located at 1885 Tooley Road near Howell, Michigan. It was listed on the National Register of Historic Places in 1995.

== History ==
George Louk was born in Dansville, New York in 1825. In 1847, he purchased 40 acres at this site and settled in to begin farming. In the 1850s, he traveled to California as part of the California Gold Rush; while there, he purchased an additional 40 acres across the road from his Michigan farmstead. He returned to Michigan some time before 1858; in that year he purchased an additional 80 acres, and married Cornelia Lake, the daughter of a Howell-area brick merchant. At some point around this time, Louk constructed a log house near where the present farmhouse stands. The Louks constructed a large barn on the property at some point before 1873. The corncrib and granary on the farm likely date from the same period. In 1878, the constructed the present farmhouse. In 1900, the Louks sold 100 acres to Spencer and Mary E. Tooley, and moved into the city of Howell. George Louk died in 1903, and his wife in 1916.

Spencer and Mary Tooley farmed the property after their purchase from the Louks, but Mary Tooley died of tuberculosis in 1902. Spencer continued to live on the property until his death in 1925, after which the farm passed to his three children: Olive (a daughter with Spencer's first wife Maggie), Fanny, and Jay (both children of Spencer and Mary). Jay and Olive continued to farm the property, with Jay being locally prominent for his breeding of Holstein Friesian cattle. Olive died in 1953, and Jay remained farming the land until 1960, when he sold it to Edward and Judy Hubbel. Jay Tooley died in 1970. The Hubbels continued to own the farm at least through the 1990s.

== Description ==
The Louk Farm currently encompassed 25 acres, county, is a 25-acre section of a once larger farm. The property includes an 1878 Italianate farmhouse, a barn, corncrib and granary that predating the house, and a small c. 1925 building that originally housed an electricity source for the farm. The buildings front onto a quiet rural road, with large trees lining the lane.

The farmhouse is a two-story clapboard Italianate Upright and Wing structure with a cross gabled roof and a fieldstone basement. A kitchen wing is at the rear. The front facade has two windows on each story in the upright section. A recessed wing is fronted by a porch, which shelters a paneled door flanked by sidelights. A single gable on the roof is above a second-story door, also flanked by sidelights, which opens on the roof of the porch. Windows and doors are topped with triangular pediments.

The two-story horse barn is sided with board and batten. and topped with a low gable roof with wide eaves. The barn sits on a fieldstone foundation. A nearby combination corncrib and granary is of similar construction. A small clapboarded windowless building with shed roof that once held electric machinery is located near the house.

== See also ==
- National Register of Historic Places listings in Livingston County, Michigan
