= Howell station (Ann Arbor Railway) =

- Ann Arbor Railway Station
- U.S. National Register of Historic Places
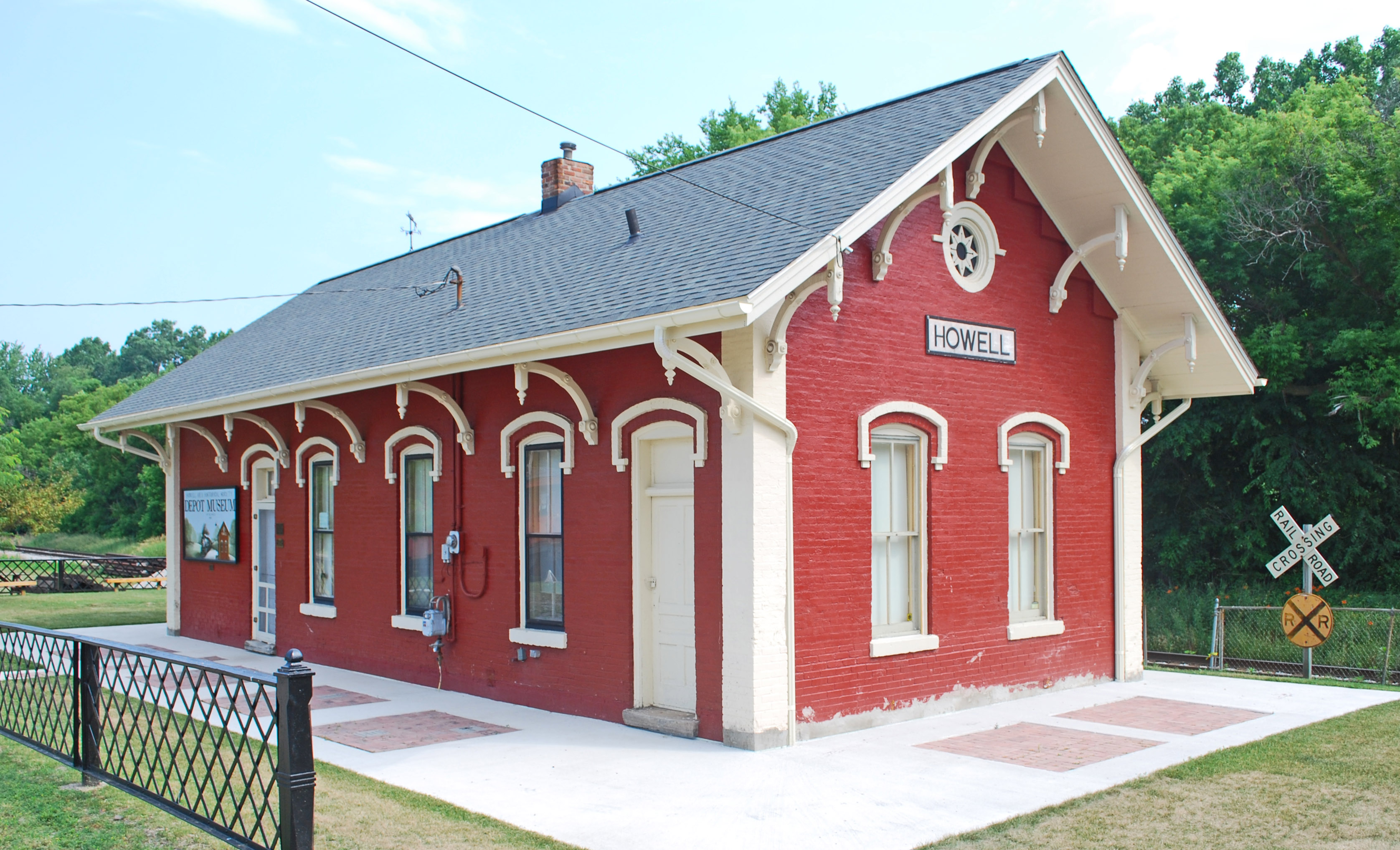
- Interactive map
- Location: 128 Wetmore St., Howell, Michigan
- Coordinates: 42°36′34″N 83°55′46″W
- Area: less than one acre
- Built: 1886
- NRHP reference No.: 71000405
- Added to NRHP: May 6, 1971

The Ann Arbor Railway Howell Depot is a railroad depot located at 128 Wetmore Street in Howell, Michigan. It was listed on the National Register of Historic Places in 1971. The depot is currently used as the Howell Depot Museum. It is located on the Ann Arbor Railroad main line.

== History ==
In the early 1880s, Howell was served by one railroad, the Detroit, Lansing and Northern Railroad. In 1885, promoters for a new proposed line, the Toledo, Ann Arbor and North Michigan Railway, raised money to include Howell on the railroad's route, arguing that having two lines serving the town would reduce prices through competition. This depot was constructed in the fall of 1886 to serve the railroad, and the line was completed a short time later. In 1895, the railway was renamed the Ann Arbor Railroad. The depot was used for passenger service until 1951, when service ceased. The railway continued to use the depot as office space. In 1970, the Howell Area Historical Society purchased the depot and opened it as a museum.

== Description ==
The Ann Arbor Railway Station is a rectangular brick side-gable building measuring 50 feet by 22 feet. It has a bay window located on the track side, with the remaining windows being two over two sliding sash units with arched hoods. The interior has tree room with eighteen foot ceilings. Wainscoting in the rooms is approximately four feet high; and the floor boards are two feet wide.

== Gallery ==
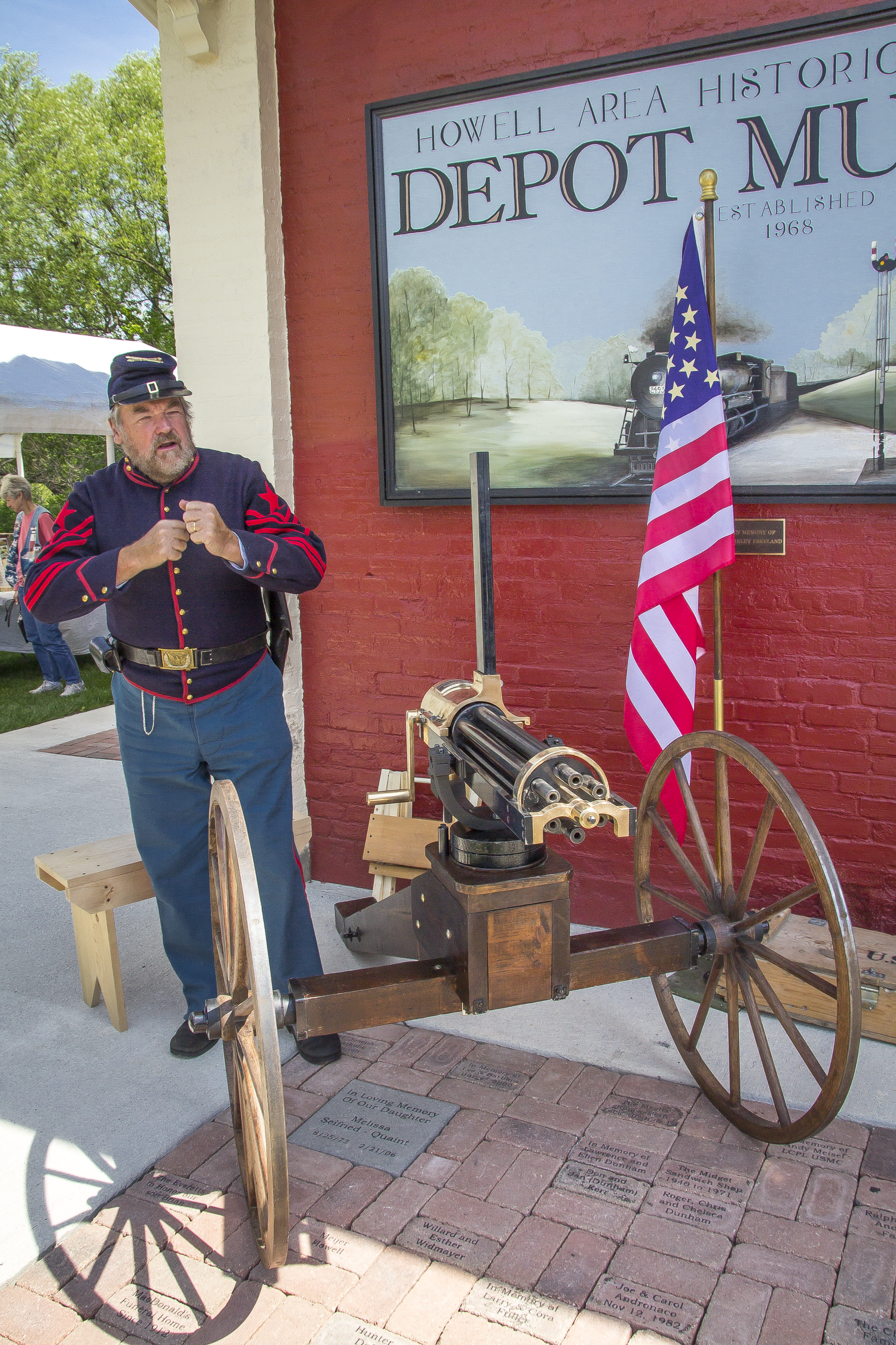

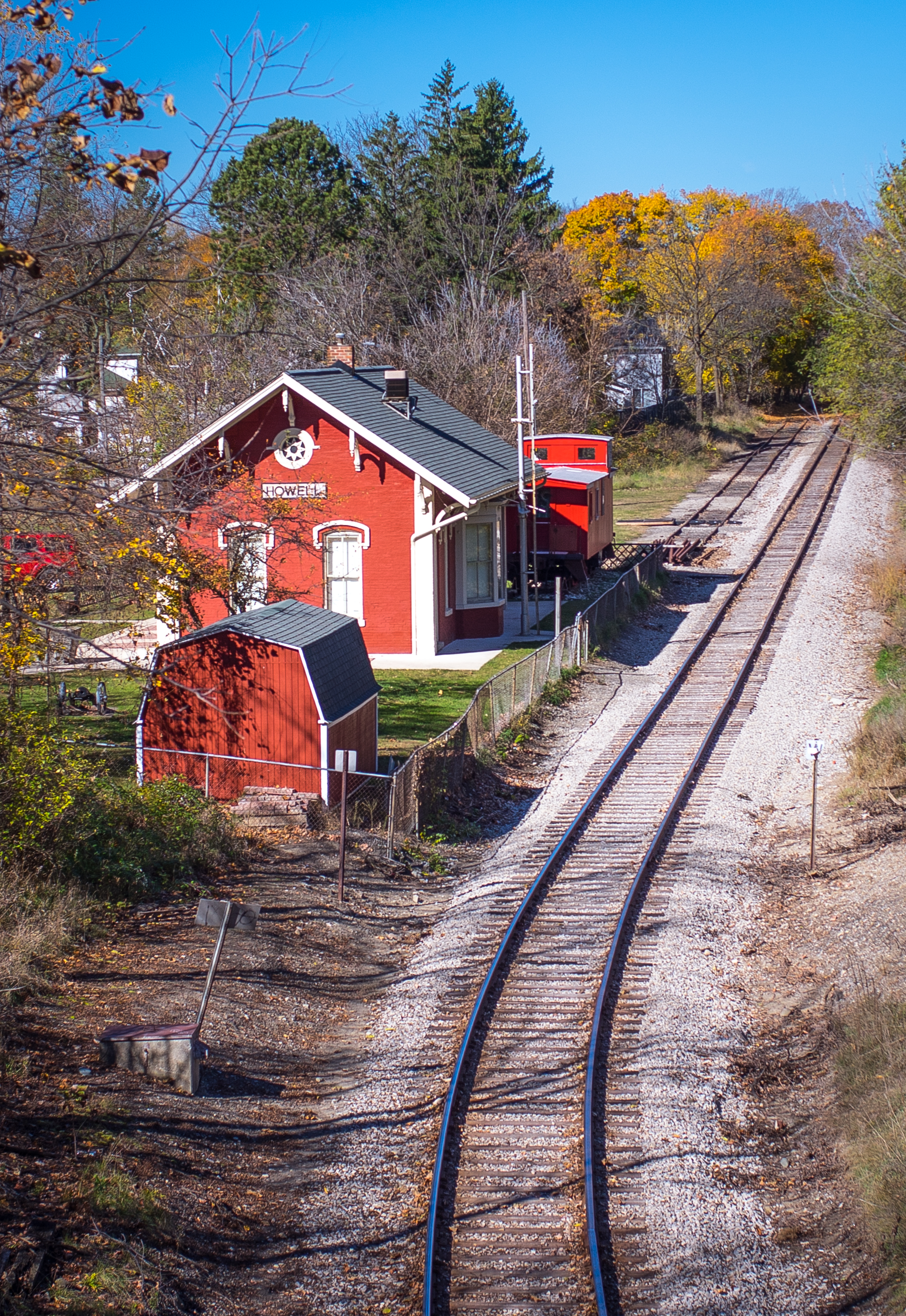

== See also ==
- National Register of Historic Places listings in Livingston County, Michigan
