= Livingston County Courthouse (Michigan) =

- U.S. National Register of Historic Places
- Michigan State Historic Site
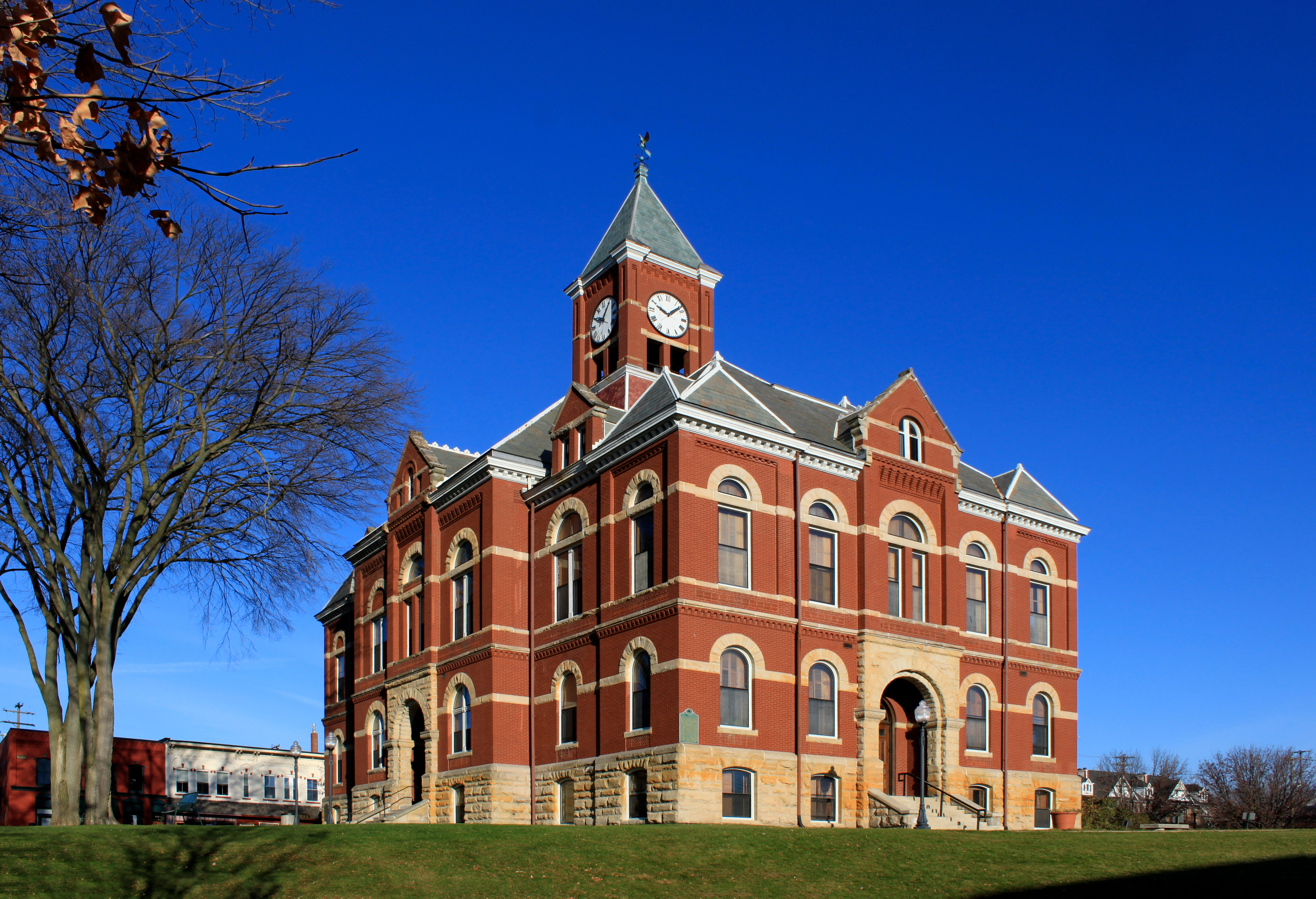

- Location within Michigan Location within the United States
- Interactive map showing the location of Livingston County Courthouse
- Location: 200 E. Grand River Ave., Howell, Michigan
- Coordinates: 42°36′26″N 83°55′41″W
- Area: 1.4 acres (0.57 ha)
- Built: 1889
- Architect: Albert E. French
- NRHP reference No.: 76001031
- Added to NRHP: August 13, 1976

The Livingston County Courthouse is a government building located at 200 East Grand River Avenue in Howell, Michigan. It was listed on the National Register of Historic Places in 1976.

== History ==
The first European settlers in what is now Livingston County, Michigan arrived in the 1820s. However, the population grew rapidly, and in 1833 Livingston County was created, and its government was organized in 1836. The two-year-old village of Howell was chosen as the county seat, due to its central location. However, many county residents protested the designation, and the county had to rent rooms to use as offices. It was not until 1847 that the first county courthouse was constructed. This building served until 1874, when it was replaced.

By the early 1880s county officials realized that the new 1874 courthouse was too small for the county's needs. The county rented office space from nearby businesses, and prisoners were housed at the county jail in neighboring Shiawassee County. The county Board of Commissioners formed a building committee, which recommended a new facility, and voters approved the proposal in 1889. The county hired Detroit architect Albert E. French to design a new courthouse; construction started in 1889 and was completed in 1890. In the early 1970s, the county considered replacing the courthouse, but renovated it instead.

== Description ==
The Livingston County Courthouse is a two-and-one-half story brick structure with a half-basement of rough-cut limestone ashlar. The building is relatively symmetrical, spanning five bays on the east and west facades and seven bays at the north and south. The three center bays on the north and south project slightly. A limestone ashlar belt course demarcates the first and second floors; limestone is also used for the entryway arches, lintels, and window hoods. The building is topped with a multi-gabled hip roof and a central clock tower.

The interior contains oak and maple woodwork, which is of particularly fine quality in the circuit courtroom, which contains the original judge's desk, carved railing, spectator seats, and wainscoting, as well as bookcases and a carved oak wall clock. Many interior entryways are richly carved with floral decorations and gargoyles. Walls in many of the public areas are decorated with unusual floral adamants.

== See also ==
- National Register of Historic Places listings in Livingston County, Michigan
