= Marion Township, Livingston County, Michigan =

Marion Township, Michigan
- Civil township
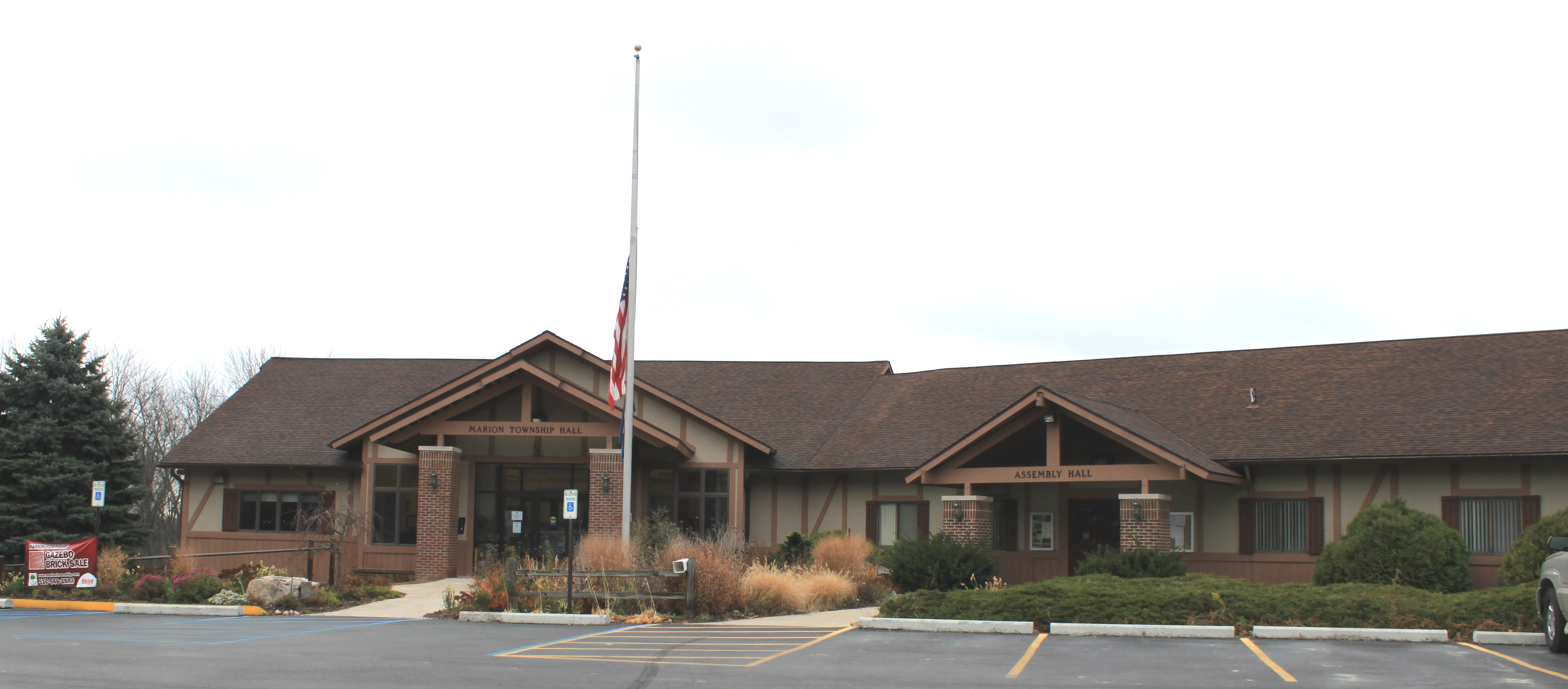
- Marion Township Hall on Coon Lake Road

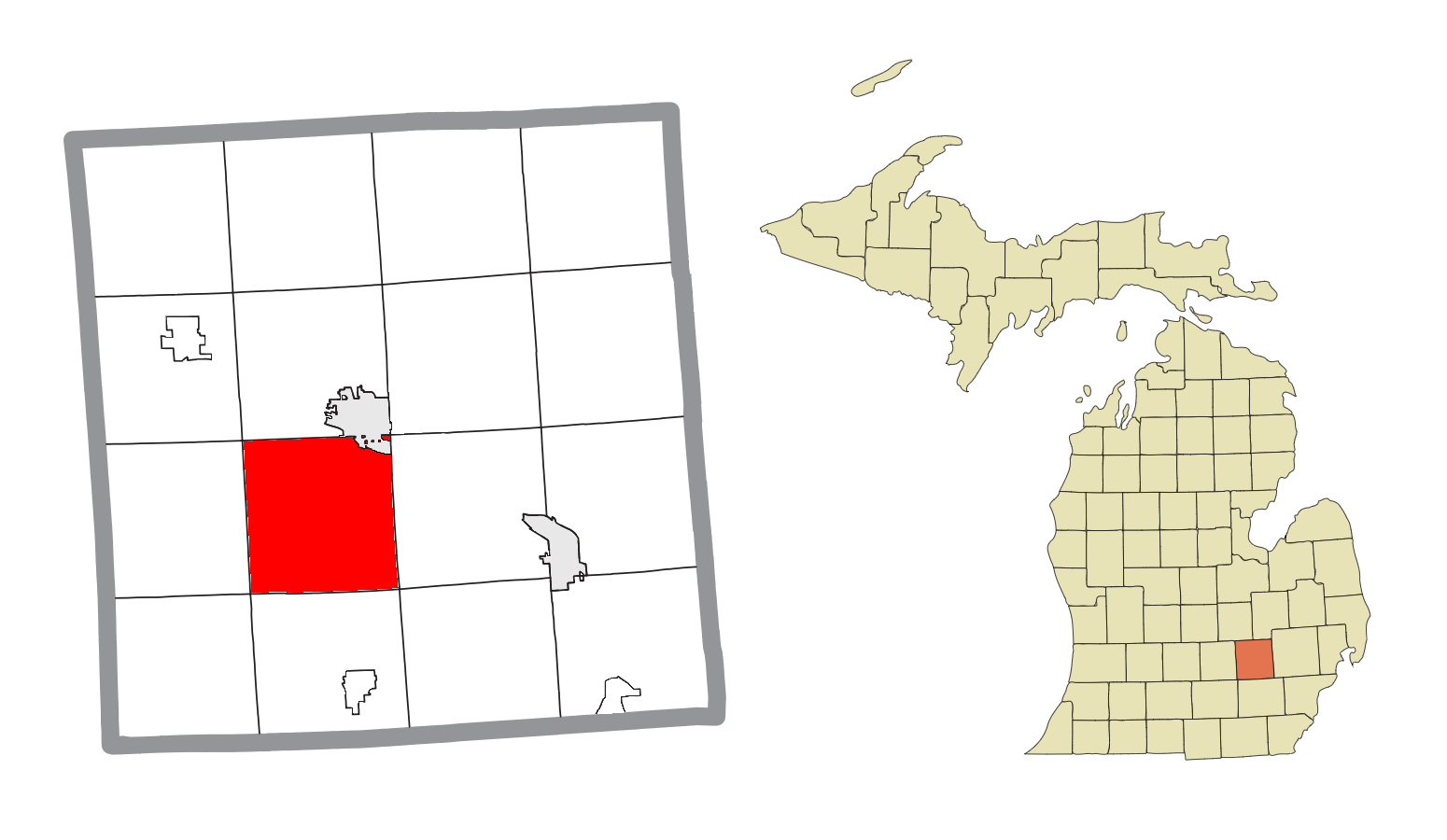
- Location within Livingston County

- Location in Michigan Location in the United States
- Coordinates: 42°33′51″N 83°57′57″W
- Country: United States
- State: Michigan
- County: Livingston

Government
  - Supervisor: Bill Fenton
  - Clerk: Tammy Beal

Area
  - Total: 35.8 sq mi (92.8 km^{2})
  - Land: 34.9 sq mi (90.4 km^{2})
  - Water: 0.93 sq mi (2.4 km^{2})
- Elevation: 925 ft (282 m)

Population (2020)
  - Total: 11,245
  - Density: 322/sq mi (124/km^{2})
- Time zone: UTC-5 (Eastern (EST))
  - Summer (DST): UTC-4 (EDT)
- ZIP code(s): 48843 (Howell); 48836 (Fowlerville)
- Area code: 517
- FIPS code: 26-51640
- GNIS feature ID: 1626689
- Website: www.mariontownship.com

Marion Township is a civil township of Livingston County in the U.S. state of Michigan. The population was 11,245 at the 2020 census, up from 9,996 at the 2010 census.

== Communities ==
- East Marion was the name of a post office here from 1849 until 1856.

== Geography ==
The township is in central Livingston County and is bordered to the northeast by the city of Howell, the county seat. Interstate 96 runs along the northeast edge of the township, with access from Exit 137 (Pinckney Road). I-96 leads southeast 54 miles (87 km) to Detroit and northwest 36 miles (58 km) to Lansing.

According to the United States Census Bureau, Marion Township has a total area of 35.8 square miles (92.8 km^{2}), of which 34.9 square miles (90.4 km^{2}) are land and 0.93 square miles (2.4 km^{2}), or 2.61%, are water. The township is part of the watersheds of three different Great Lakes: the eastern side of the township is within the watershed of the South Branch of the Shiawassee River, leading north towards Saginaw Bay on Lake Huron; the western side contains the headwaters of the Red Cedar River, flowing north and west to the Grand River and eventually Lake Michigan; and the southern part of the township is part of the Huron River watershed, leading southeast to Lake Erie.

== Demographics ==
As of the census of 2000, there were 6,757 people, 2,271 households, and 1,925 families residing in the township. The population density was 190.0 inhabitants per square mile (73.4/km^{2}). There were 2,388 housing units at an average density of 67.1 per square mile (25.9/km^{2}). The racial makeup of the township was 97.78% White, 0.03% African American, 0.41% Native American, 0.27% Asian, 0.01% Pacific Islander, 0.12% from other races, and 1.38% from two or more races. Hispanic or Latino of any race were 1.04% of the population.

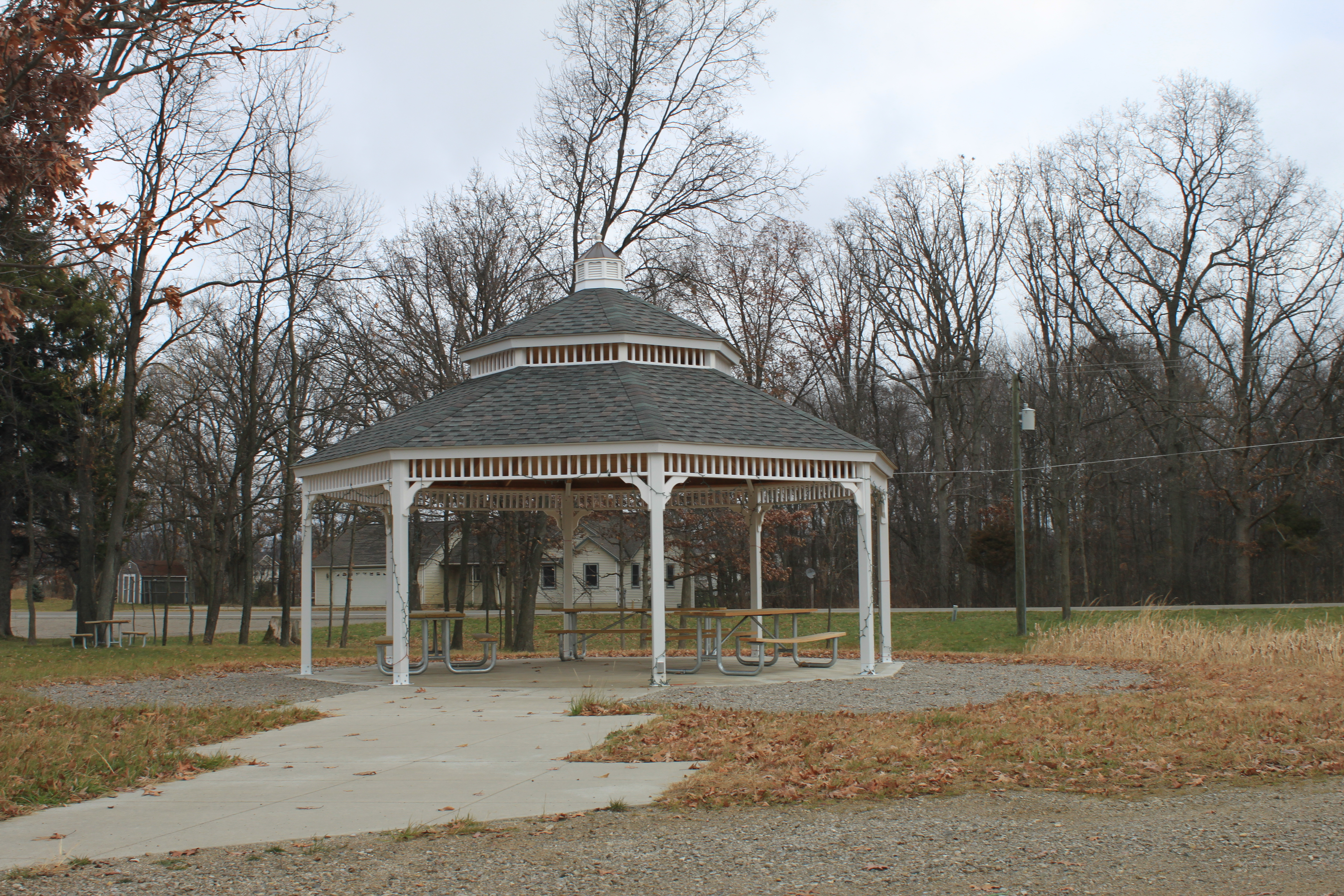
Township Park #2 Gazebo, Coon Lake Rd.

There were 2,271 households, out of which 42.2% had children under the age of 18 living with them, 76.7% were married couples living together, 5.3% had a female householder with no husband present, and 15.2% were non-families. 11.8% of all households were made up of individuals, and 3.7% had someone living alone who was 65 years of age or older. The average household size was 2.97 and the average family size was 3.22.

In the township the population was spread out, with 29.3% under the age of 18, 5.5% from 18 to 24, 31.6% from 25 to 44, 25.8% from 45 to 64, and 7.8% who were 65 years of age or older. The median age was 37 years. For every 100 females, there were 102.1 males. For every 100 females age 18 and over, there were 102.1 males.

The median income for a household in the township was $72,378, and the median income for a family was $76,112. Males had a median income of $57,228 versus $33,101 for females. The per capita income for the township was $26,862. About 1.0% of families and 2.0% of the population were below the poverty line, including 1.9% of those under age 18 and none of those age 65 or over.
