= Green Oak Township, Michigan =

- Charter township
- Green Oak Charter Township
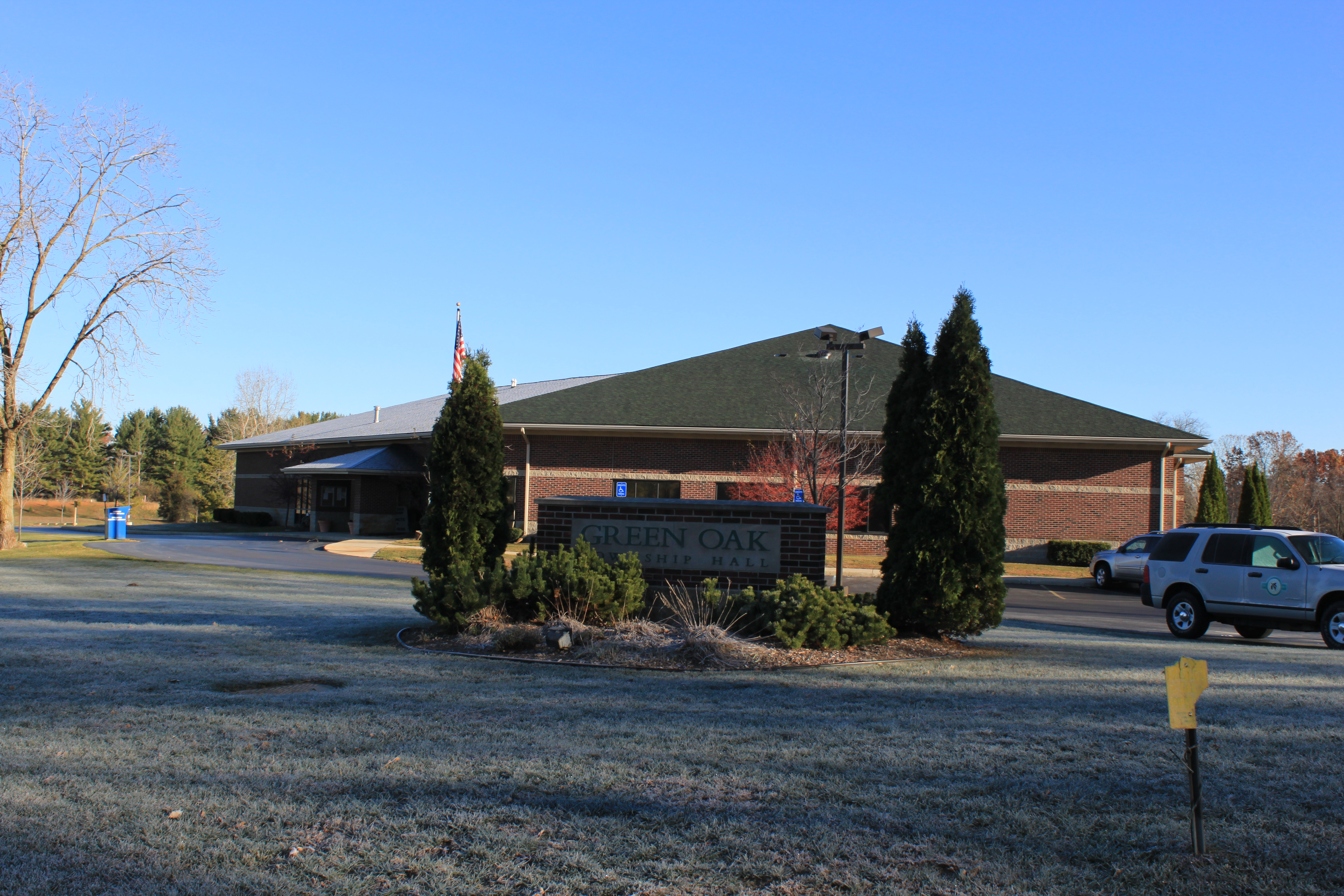
- Green Oak Township Hall on Silver Lake Road

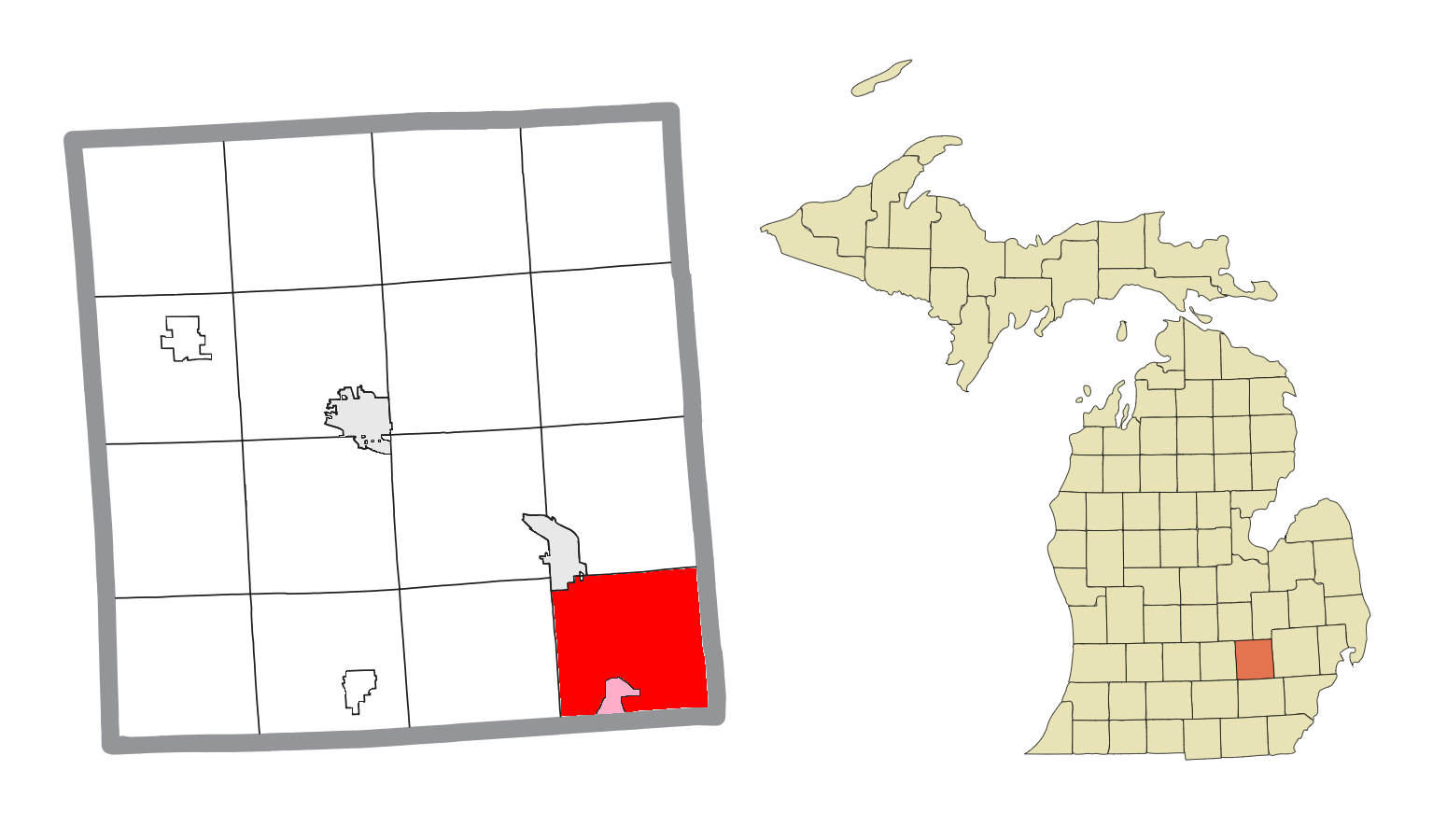
- Location within Livingston County (red) and an administered portion of the Whitmore Lake community (pink)

- Location within the state of Michigan
- Coordinates: 42°28′43″N 83°43′38″W
- Country: United States
- State: Michigan
- County: Livingston

Government
  - Supervisor: Mark St. Charles
  - Clerk: Michael Sedlak

Area
  - Charter township: 36.8 sq mi (95.2 km^{2})
  - Land: 34.7 sq mi (89.9 km^{2})
  - Water: 2.0 sq mi (5.2 km^{2})
- Elevation: 890 ft (270 m)

Population (2020)
  - Charter township: 19,539
  - Density: 563/sq mi (217.3/km^{2})
  - Metro: 4,296,250 (Metro Detroit)
- Time zone: UTC-5 (Eastern (EST))
  - Summer (DST): UTC-4 (EDT)
- FIPS code: 26-35060
- GNIS feature ID: 1626400
- Website: www.greenoaktwp.com

Green Oak Charter Township is a charter township of Livingston County in the U.S. state of Michigan. As of the 2020 census, the township population was 19,539. In September 2005, the township board voted to incorporate as a charter township, becoming the second charter township in Livingston County.

== Communities ==
The township has several unincorporated communities within its boundaries.

- Green Oak is on east side of the township on Silver Lake Road and the CSX rail tracks (42°29′33″N 83°41′53″W).
- Island Lake is located on the south side of the lake of the same name at the railroad.
- Rushton is an unincorporated community on Rushton Road at Nichwagh Lake between 10 Mile and 9 Mile roads.(42°27′07″N 83°41′46″W).
- Whitmore Lake is also a Census-designated place.

== Geography ==
According to the United States Census Bureau, the township has a total area of 36.7 square miles (95 km^{2}), of which 34.7 square miles (90 km^{2}) is land and 2.0 square miles (5.2 km^{2}) (5.50%) is water.

== Demographics ==
As of the census of 2000, there were 15,618 people, 5,438 households, and 4,312 families residing in the township. The population density was 449.7 inhabitants per square mile (173.6/km^{2}). There were 5,772 housing units at an average density of 166.2 per square mile (64.2/km^{2}). The racial makeup of the township was 96.92% White, 0.58% African American, 0.47% Native American, 0.49% Asian, 0.01% Pacific Islander, 0.20% from other races, and 1.32% from two or more races. Hispanic or Latino of any race were 1.28% of the population.

There were 5,438 households, out of which 38.9% had children under the age of 18 living with them, 70.6% were married couples living together, 5.3% had a female householder with no husband present, and 20.7% were non-families. 16.5% of all households were made up of individuals, and 5.1% had someone living alone who was 65 years of age or older. The average household size was 2.79 and the average family size was 3.15.

In the township, 29.2% of the population was under the age of 18, 6.6% from 18 to 24, 30.8% from 25 to 44, 24.5% from 45 to 64, and 8.8% who were 65 years of age or older. The median age was 37 years. For every 100 females, there were 107.9 males. For every 100 females age 18 and over, there were 103.1 males.

The median income for a household in the township was $75,173, and the median income for a family was $83,550. Males had a median income of $61,131 versus $39,270 for females. The per capita income for the township was $29,923. About 2.0% of families and 2.6% of the population were below the poverty line, including 2.2% of those under age 18 and 4.5% of those age 65 or over.

== Development ==
In 2004, Costco and Kohl's built stores off the Lee Road exit of U.S. Highway 23 in the northwest part of the township, just southeast of Brighton. In September 2006, a new shopping center, Green Oak Village Place, opened on the east side of US 23 at exit 58. With the mall opening, the exit at US 23 had to be reconfigured. Three roundabouts were added at the exit to maintain traffic flow, forming a hybrid dumbbell interchange with a double roundabout on one side of the highway.
