= Hartland, Michigan =

- Census-designated place (CDP) & unincorporated community
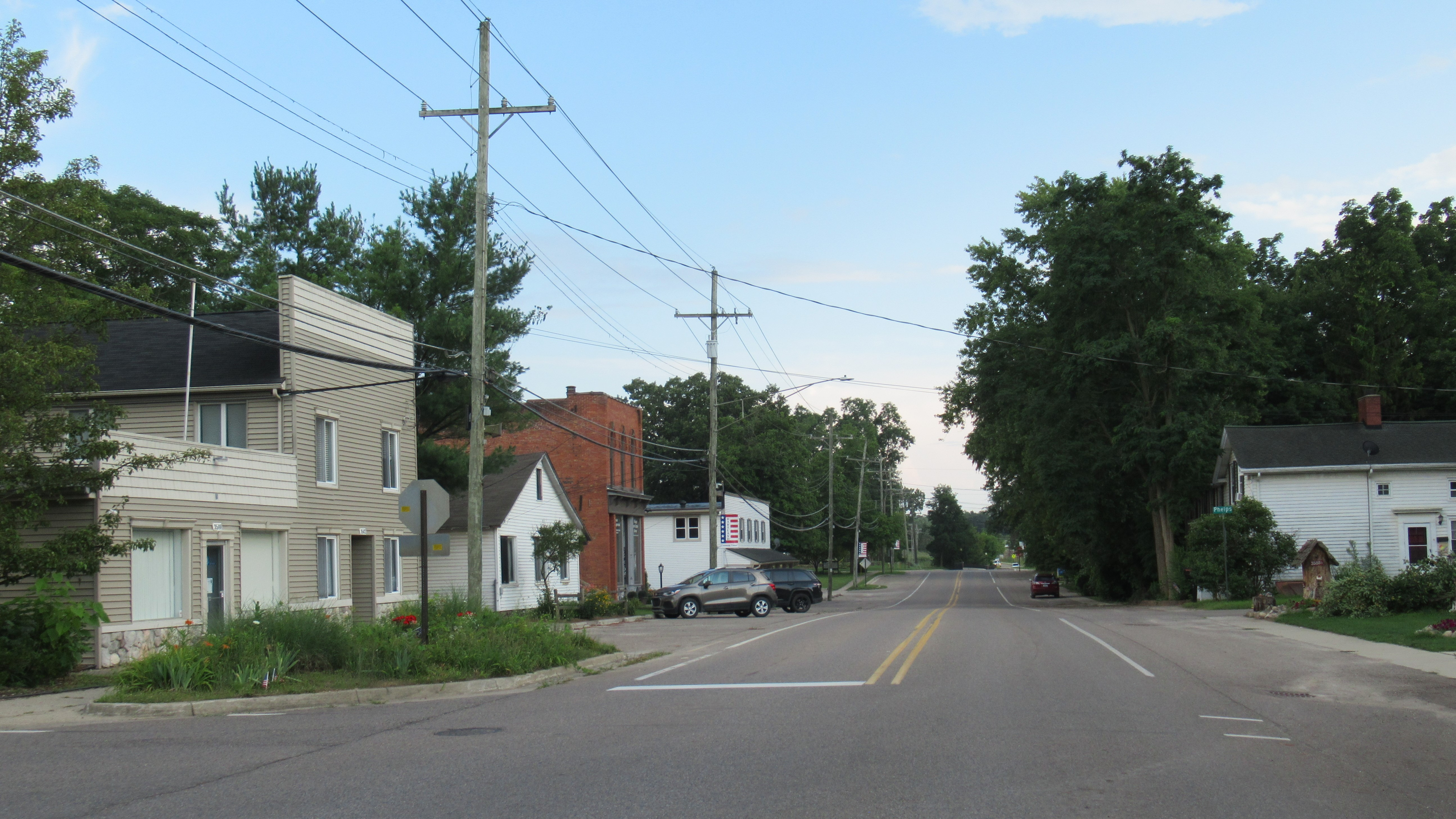
- Looking south along Hartland Road

- Location within Michigan Location within the United States
- Coordinates: 42°39′24″N 83°45′15″W
- Country: United States
- State: Michigan
- County: Livingston
- Township: Hartland

Area
  - Total: 2.29 sq mi (5.92 km^{2})
  - Land: 2.28 sq mi (5.91 km^{2})
  - Water: 0 sq mi (0.00 km^{2})
- Elevation: 949 ft (289 m)

Population (2020)
  - Total: 777
  - Density: 340.4/sq mi (131.43/km^{2})
- Time zone: UTC-5 (Eastern (EST))
  - Summer (DST): UTC-4 (EDT)
- ZIP Code: 48353
- Area code: 810
- FIPS code: 26-37020
- GNIS feature ID: 2804670

Hartland is a census-designated place (CDP) comprising the main community in Hartland Township, in Livingston County, Michigan, United States. As of the 2020 census, Hartland had a population of 777. US Highway 23 forms the western edge of the community; the highway leads north 27 miles (43 km) to Flint and south the same distance to Ann Arbor.

Hartland was first listed as a CDP prior to the 2020 census.

== Demographics ==
Historical population
Census	Pop.	Note	%±
2020	777		—
U.S. Decennial Census
