= South Ore Creek =

- Aerial view of South Ore Creek in Brighton

Location
- Country: United States
- State: Michigan
- County: Livingston

Physical characteristics
- Source: Maxfield Lake
  - location: Hartland Township
- Mouth: Huron River at Ore Lake
  - location: Hamburg Township
  - coordinates: 42°29′08″N 83°47′51″W
- Length: 18 mi (29 km)
- Basin size: 34 square miles (88 km^{2})

Basin features
- Cities: Brighton

South Ore Creek is a tributary of the Huron River in Livingston County, Michigan. Originating from Maxfield Lake in southern Hartland Township, it flows through the city of Brighton and several reservoirs before draining into the Huron at Ore Lake. Fish such as smallmouth bass and largemouth bass are present in the creek, although much of the river's wildlife consists of heat-tolerant fish due to high summer water temperatures. Algal blooms and elevated phosphorus levels after storms occasionally pose a risk to water quality in the creek, alongside high amounts of impervious surfaces across the watershed.

Traditionally inhabited by the Ojibwe and Potawatomi peoples, Euro-American settlers colonized the area during 1830s, naming it and nearby North Ore Creek for iron deposits which impart a red hue on the water. Forests in the area were cleared for timber, while open areas converted to agriculture. Much of the drainage basin now consists of suburban residential areas, with smaller amounts of agricultural areas and natural areas. Only a small portion of the watershed is within protected areas, such as Brighton State Recreation Area.

== Course ==
South Ore Creek is a tributary of the Huron River in Livingston County, Michigan. Originating from Maxfield Lake in southern Hartland Township, it flows southwest to Woodland Lake before turning south and running through the city of Brighton. The creek is impounded into the Brighton Mill Pond and Brighton Lake reservoirs, but continues south through Brighton State Recreation Area. It drains into Ore Lake in Hamburg Township, which is also fed by the smaller Dibrova Creek. The lake is directly connected to the Huron River, which continues through Southeast Michigan, emptying into Lake Erie south of the city of Flat Rock.

== Hydrology ==
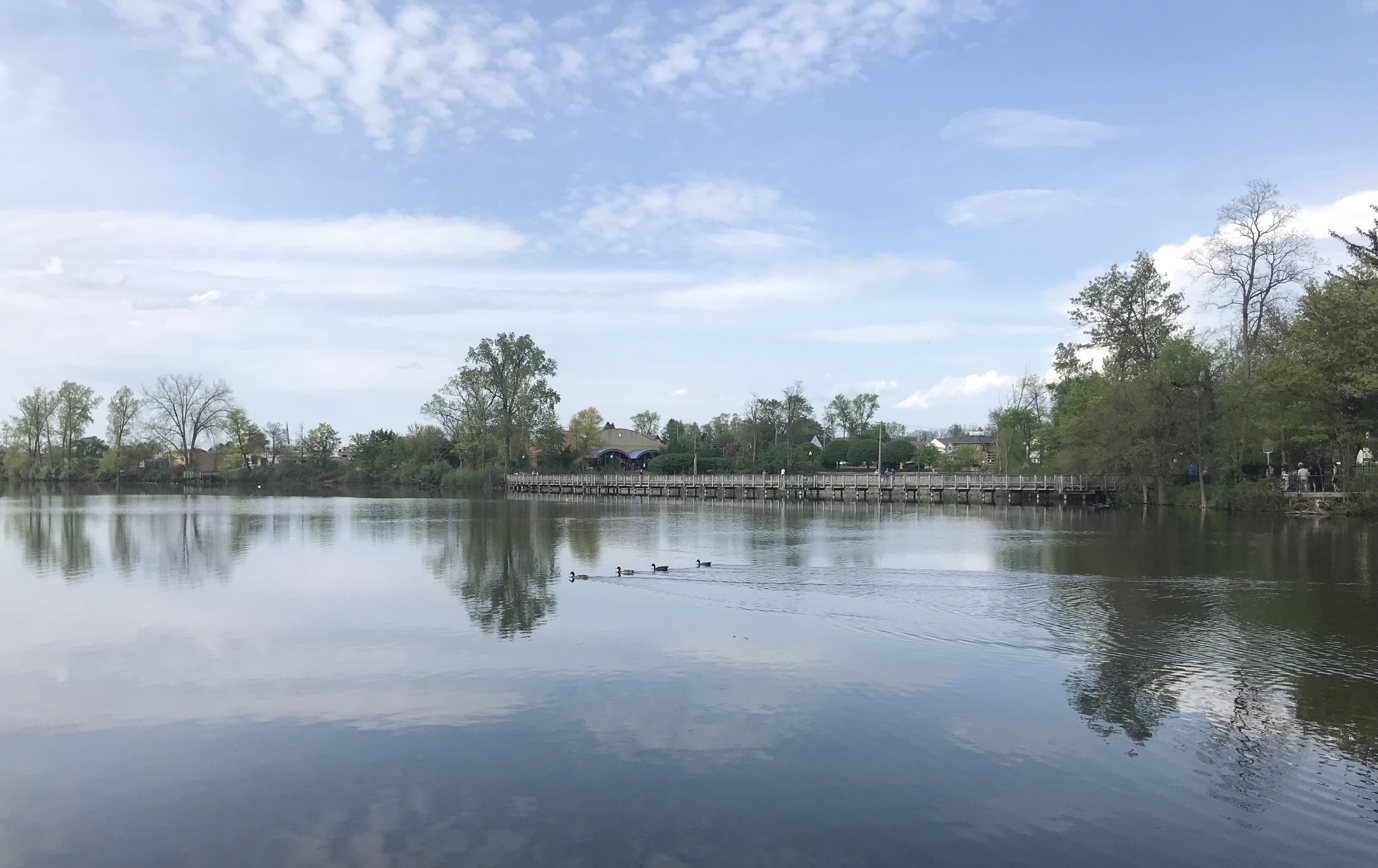
Brighton Mill Pond, an impoundment of South Ore Creek, in Brighton

The South Ore Creek drainage basin covers 34 square miles (88 km^{2}) of eastern Livingston County, including portions of five townships (Hartland, Oceola, Genoa, Brighton, and Hamburg) and all of the city of Brighton. The main stem runs for about 18 miles (29 km), descending 108 feet (33 m) in elevation over its course. A total of 36 miles (58 km) of stream channel is found in the watershed, between the main stem and all of its tributaries.

The creek receives its streamflow from groundwater and surface runoff. Its flashiness (the rate stream flow rises and falls during storms) is much lower than other similar streams in Michigan, indicating more naturalistic hydrological conditions. The upper reaches of the creek have silty substrate without pools or riffles, while the lower portions are a mix of sand, gravel, and rubble with occasional riffles. Stream bends, pools, riffles, and undercut riverbanks present in portions of the lower course allow for a variety of habitats for aquatic life.

Three dams block the main stem creek, with a fourth impounding Long Lake on an upper tributary. The Brighton Mill Pond, created by Brighton Mill Dam, contributes to higher water temperatures and algal blooms. In July and August, portions of the creek can exceed water temperatures of 80 °F (27 °C), higher than the other Huron River tributaries.

About 15% of the South Ore Creek watershed is covered by impervious surfaces such as pavement, causing significant harm to fish and insect communities in the creek. About 8% of the watershed is used for agriculture, while 47% is occupied by residential and urban areas. Only 22% of the watershed is occupied by natural areas such as forests and wetlands, while only 7% of the watershed is within protected areas. Most agriculture in the watershed consists of small farms in the northern portions, while commercial and residential uses predominate in the south. The areas directly bordering the stream include natural areas such as wetlands and forests, residential zones, fields, and impervious surfaces. Almost all remaining natural areas adjacent to the stream are under private ownership and are threatened by the prospect of increased low-density development.

Storms sometimes bring high phosphorus levels in the creek, likely due to residential runoff. The prevalence of the fecal E. coli bacteria may reach unsafe levels in 48 hours following storms, although as of 2012, no specific measurements of E. coli in the South Ore Creek are available. Total suspended solids (a measure of the creek's turbidity and erosion) in South Ore Creek are very low, while its conductivity (an indicator of dissolved solids) can reach slightly elevated levels on occasion.

== Biology ==
Both smallmouth bass and largemouth bass are present in South Ore Creek. Many areas of the creek are inhabited by fish tolerant of warm water, such as bluegill, channel catfish, green sunfish, and creek chub, alongside various species of smaller fishes such as shiners and darters.

The portion of the creek immediately downstream of the Brighton Lake dam has a poor insect community; surveys beginning in the late 1990s showed an absence of pollution-sensitive insects such as stoneflies, although conditions improve further downriver towards Ore Lake.

== Human history ==
Prior to Euro-American colonization, the South Ore Creek watershed was inhabited by the Ojibwe (or Chippewa) and Potawatomi peoples. White settlement of the region began in the early 1830s, and a village initially known as Ore Creek emerged around gristmills and sawmills constructed around the creek. This village was incorporated as Brighton in 1867. Both South Ore Creek and nearby North Ore Creek (a tributary of the Shiawassee River) were named after iron deposits present in their basins, which could sometimes give the water a reddish color. South Ore Creek was initially named simply as Ore Creek until it was renamed to distinguish it from North Ore Creek.

Settlers cleared forested regions of the watershed for timber production, while open plains were converted for agriculture. The Brighton Mill Pond dam was built in 1878, while the Woodland Lake and Brighton Lake dams were built in 1928 and 1929 respectively. Agriculture declined in the region by the early 21st century, giving way to growing suburban areas.
