= Brighton Airport =

Airport in Michigan, United States

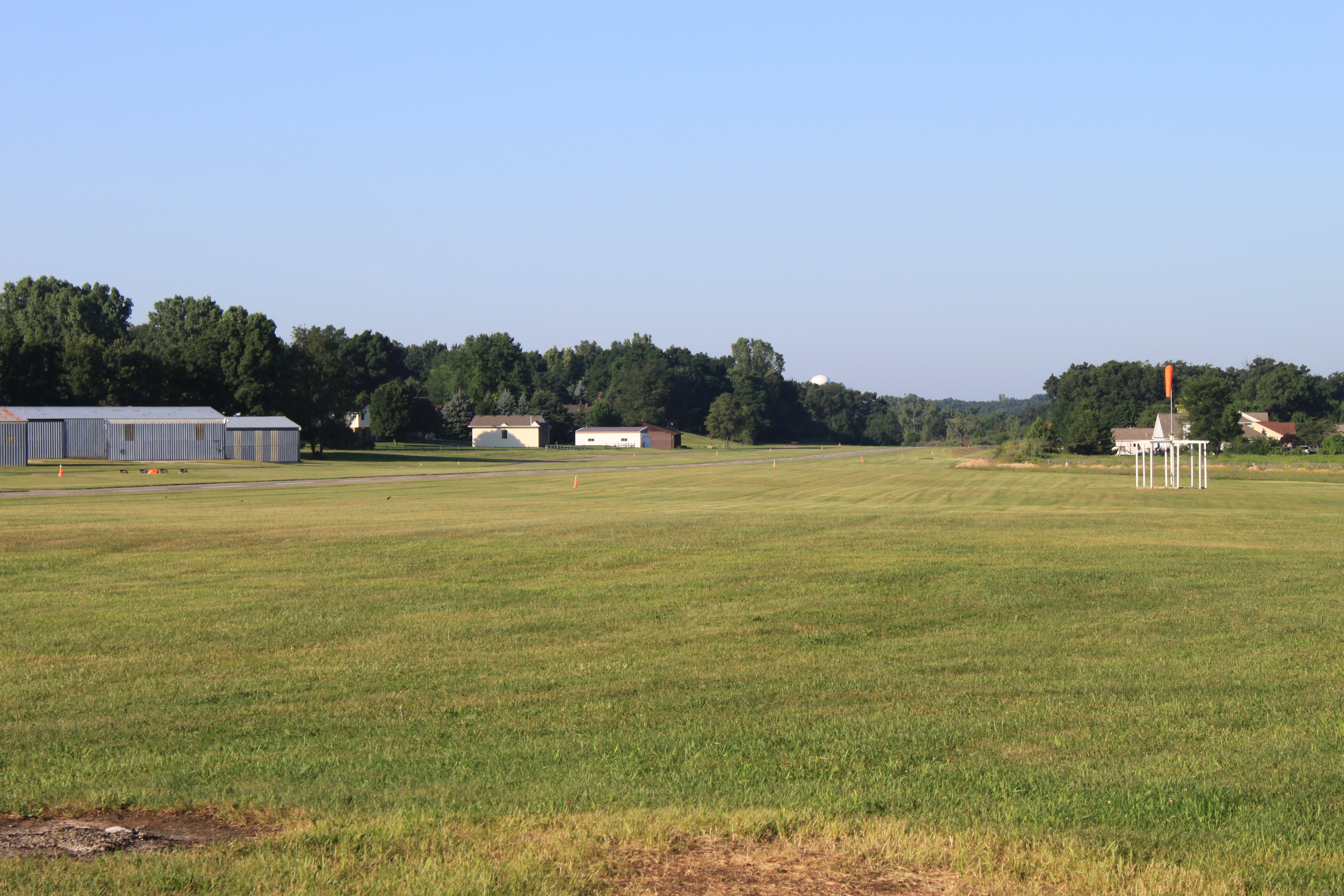
- Airport runway area
- IATA: none; ICAO: none; FAA LID: 45G

Summary
- Airport type: Public
- Owner/Operator: Brighton Airport Association
- Serves: Brighton, Michigan
- Elevation AMSL: 973 ft (297 m)
- Coordinates: 42°34′11″N 083°46′43″W
- Website: BrightonAirport.org
- Interactive map of Brighton Airport

Runways
Direction	Length		Surface
Direction	ft	m	Surface
4/22	3,104	946	Asphalt

Statistics (2019)
- Aircraft operations: 17,600
- Based aircraft: 91
- Source: Federal Aviation Administration

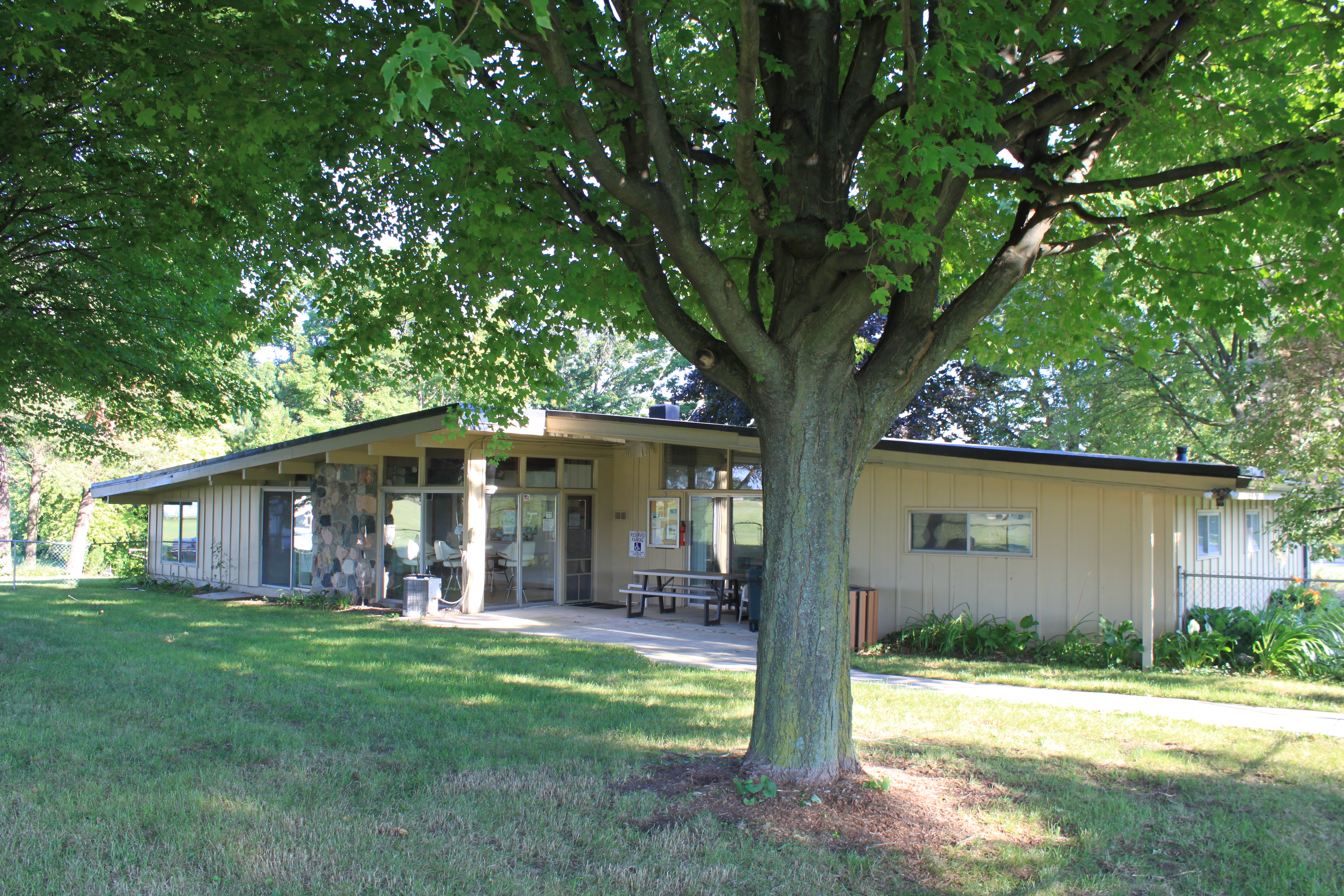
Airport office

Brighton Airport (FAA LID: 45G) is a public use airport located three nautical miles (6 km) north of the central business district of Brighton, in Livingston County, Michigan, United States.

== History ==
The airport opened in July 1947 and is used primarily for privately owned light recreational aircraft; however, it is open to the public. It was built by Lloyd Bert Beurmann. Lloyd was an engineer for General Motors but had a love for flying. The airport is now owned by the Brighton Airport Association, a not-for-profit organization, and it is managed by William Bertrand.

Brighton Airport is home to two major aircraft restoration projects, one of which is a B-25 restoration project run by the Warbirds of Glory Museum.

== Facilities and aircraft ==
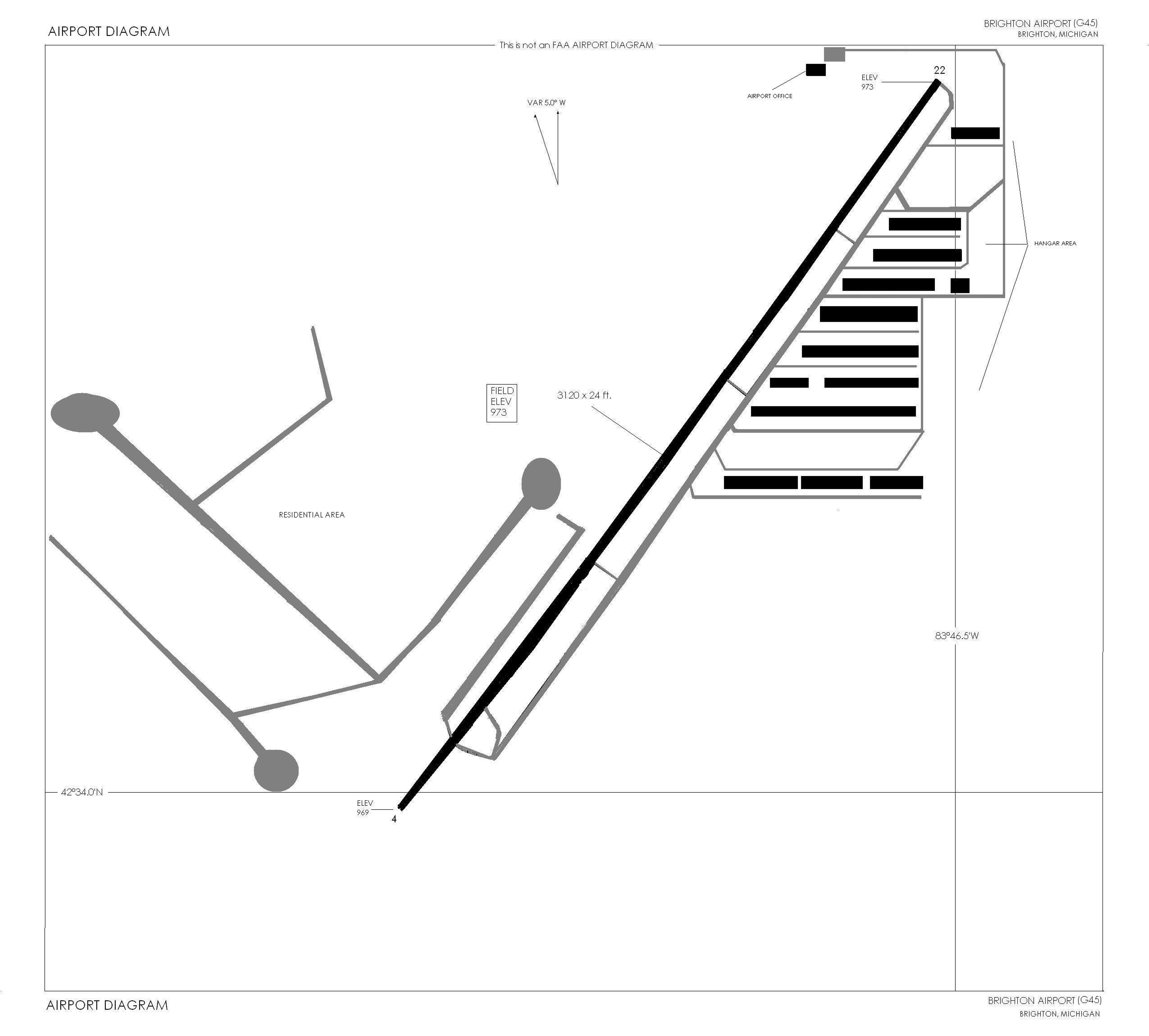
Airport diagram (click for enlarged view)

Brighton Airport covers an area of 47 acres (19 ha) at an elevation of 973 feet (297 m) above mean sea level. It has one runway designated 4/22 with an asphalt surface measuring 3,105 by 24 feet (946 x 7 m).

For the 12-month period ending December 31, 2019, the airport had 17,600 general aviation aircraft operations, an average of 48 per day. At that time there were 91 aircraft based at this airport: 98% single-engine, 1% multi-engine and 1% ultralight.

== Accidents and incidents ==
- On July 29, 2003, an Aeronca 11 Chief sustained substantial damage when it exited runway 22 at Brighton Airport. The aircraft was on its fourth landing attempt in the traffic pattern. The aircraft bounced and the power was reduced to idle after the first landing. The airplane was in a 3-point attitude and rolling on the runway when it began to turn to the right. The controls were overcorrected to the left and then again to the right, and the plane continued off the runway to the right. It was found that directional control was not possible because the rudder control assembly was separated during the landing.
- On August 9, 2009, a Beech A36TC Bonanza impacted terrain approximately 400 feet short of threshold for runway 22 at the Brighton Airport. The pilot reported, "I got too slow on approach and fell into a slower wind pocket which [decreased] my lift." The pilot attempted to add engine power, but the airplane impacted terrain. The pilot and passenger were not injured. The probable cause of the accident was found to be the pilot's failure to maintain airspeed and compensate for wind conditions during final approach.
- On September 1, 2012, an Aeronca 7AC sustained substantial damage when it impacted terrain following a loss of control during initial takeoff climb from the Brighton Airport. Witnesses observed a normal engine run-up prior to takeoff, and a normal takeoff from runway 22. Shortly after takeoff, the engine did not sound like it was developing full power and the airplane was struggling to climb. Subsequently, witnesses observed the airplane make a 180-degree turn and then descend toward the terrain in a nose down attitude. The probable cause as found to be the pilot's failure to maintain airspeed following a partial loss of engine power for reasons that could not be determined during postaccident examination, which resulted in an aerodynamic stall and loss of airplane control.

== See also ==
- List of airports in Michigan
