= Hartland Township, Michigan =

- Civil township
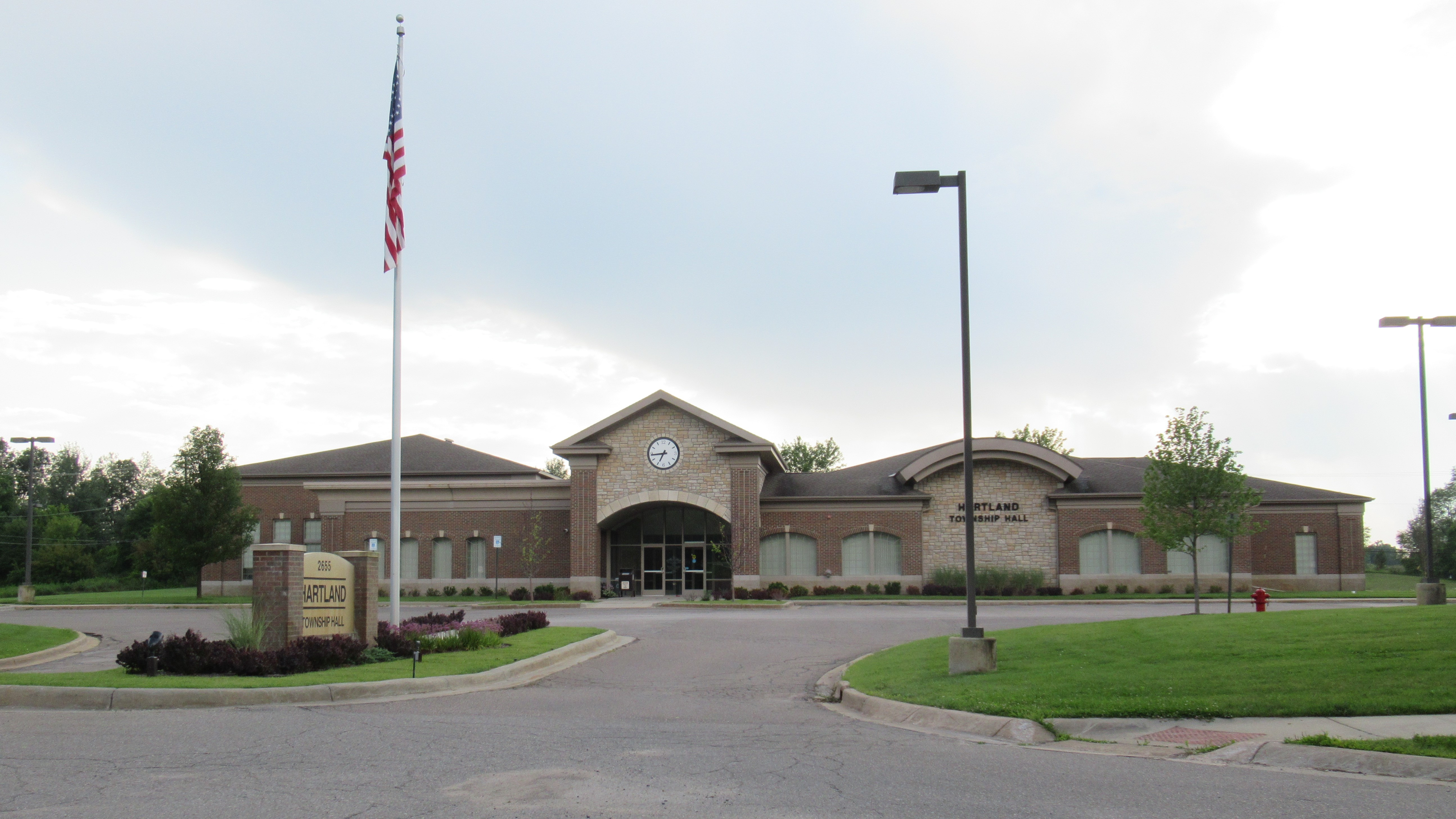
- Hartland Township Hall

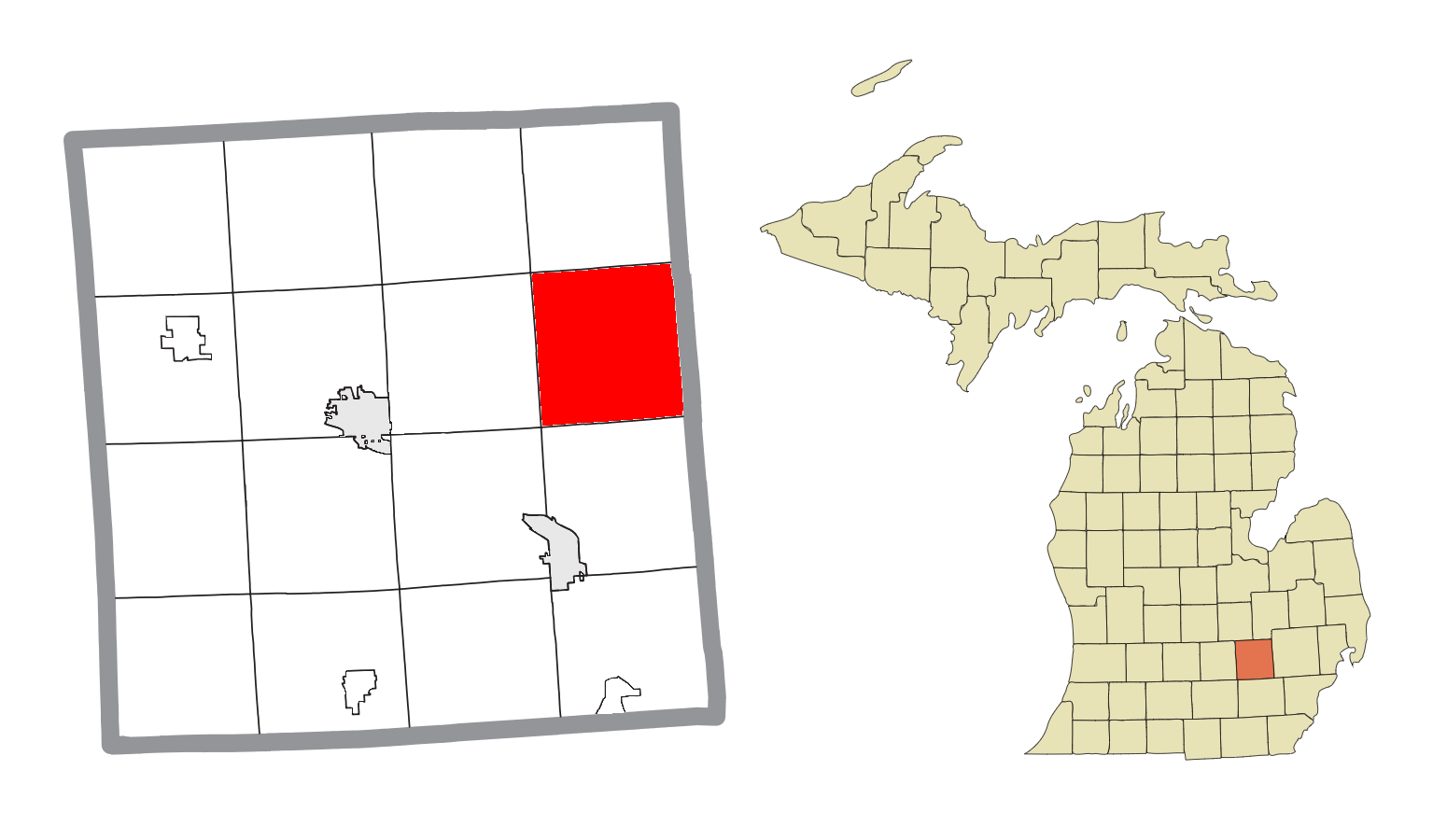
- Location within Livingston County

- Location in Michigan Location in the United States
- Coordinates: 42°38′21″N 83°44′10″W
- Country: United States
- State: Michigan
- County: Livingston
- Established: 1836

Government
  - Supervisor: William Fountain
  - Clerk: Larry Ciofu

Area
  - Total: 37.3 sq mi (96.6 km^{2})
  - Land: 35.9 sq mi (92.9 km^{2})
  - Water: 1.4 sq mi (3.7 km^{2})
- Elevation: 958 ft (292 m)

Population (2020)
  - Total: 15,256
  - Density: 425/sq mi (164/km^{2})
- Time zone: UTC-5 (Eastern (EST))
  - Summer (DST): UTC-4 (EDT)
- ZIP code(s): 48114 (Brighton); 48353 (Hartland); 48380 (Milford); 48430 (Fenton); 48442 (Holly); 48843, 48855 (Howell)
- Area codes: 248, 517, and 810
- FIPS code: 26-37040
- GNIS feature ID: 1626446
- Website: www.hartlandtwp.com

Hartland Township is a civil township of Livingston County in the U.S. state of Michigan. The population was 15,256 at the 2020 census, up from 14,663 at the 2010 census.

== Communities ==
- Hallers Corners is an unincorporated community at the border with Tyrone Township at Denton Hill and Holtforth roads (42°41′41″N 83°42′13″W).
- Hartland is an unincorporated community and census-designated place situated near the center of the township, just north of the junction of U.S. 23 and M-59.
- Parshallville is an unincorporated community partially located in the northwest corner of the township.

== Geography ==
Hartland Township is in eastern Livingston County and is bordered to the east by Oakland County. U.S. Route 23 crosses the township as a four-lane freeway, with access from Exit 67 (Highway M-59) and Exit 70 (Clyde Road). US 23 leads north 28 miles (45 km) to Flint and south the same distance to Ann Arbor. M-59 crosses the township south of Hartland village, leading east 24 miles (39 km) to Pontiac and west 10 miles (16 km) to Howell, the Livingston county seat.

According to the United States Census Bureau, the township has a total area of 37.3 square miles (96.6 km^{2}), of which 35.9 square miles (92.9 km^{2}) are land and 1.4 square miles (3.7 km^{2}), or 3.86%, are water. The northern half of the township drains via North Ore Creek to the Shiawassee River, which leads to Saginaw Bay, while the south half drains via South Ore Creek to the Huron River, which leads to Lake Erie.

== Demographics ==
As of the census of 2000, there were 10,996 people, 3,696 households, and 3,108 families residing in the township. The population density was 302.5 inhabitants per square mile (116.8/km^{2}). There were 3,908 housing units at an average density of 107.5 per square mile (41.5/km^{2}). The racial makeup of the township was 97.94% White, 0.27% African American, 0.30% Native American, 0.37% Asian, 0.25% from other races, and 0.86% from two or more races. Hispanic or Latino of any race were 1.11% of the population.

There were 3,696 households, out of which 44.3% had children under the age of 18 living with them, 75.1% were married couples living together, 6.2% had a female householder with no husband present, and 15.9% were non-families. 12.4% of all households were made up of individuals, and 3.0% had someone living alone who was 65 years of age or older. The average household size was 2.96 and the average family size was 3.24.

In the township the population was spread out, with 30.4% under the age of 18, 6.1% from 18 to 24, 31.3% from 25 to 44, 25.0% from 45 to 64, and 7.3% who were 65 years of age or older. The median age was 36 years. For every 100 females, there were 99.4 males. For every 100 females age 18 and over, there were 98.2 males.

The median income for a household in the township was $75,908, and the median income for a family was $79,524. Males had a median income of $60,797 versus $36,662 for females. The per capita income for the township was $28,971. About 1.2% of families and 1.7% of the population were below the poverty line, including 1.9% of those under age 18 and 5.7% of those age 65 or over.

== Government ==
The township is within the following electoral districts:

- State House District 47
- State Senate District 22
- US Congressional District 8
- County Commission districts 3 and 4

The township is within the following governmental service districts:

- Cromaine District Library
- Hartland Consolidated School District
