= Brighton Area Schools =

School district in Michigan

Address
- 125 South Church St. Brighton, Livingston, Michigan, 48116; United States

District information
- Type: Public
- Grades: Pre-kindergarten through 12
- Superintendent: Dr. Matthew S. Outlaw
- Schools: 7
- Budget: $142,619,000 (2022-2023 expeditures)
- NCES District ID: 2606870

Students and staff
- Students: 5,796 (2024-25)
- Teachers: 318.02 FTE (2024-25)
- Staff: 656.89 FTE (2024-25)
- Student–teacher ratio: 18.23 (2024-25)

Other information
- Website: www.brightonk12.com

The Brighton Area School District is a public school district in the metropolitan Detroit area. It serves the city of Brighton, townships of Brighton, Genoa, Green Oak, and Hamburg in Livingston County, Michigan. It also includes a portion of the Whitmore Lake census-designated place.

== History ==
The Brighton Education and Community Center building, at 125 S. Church Street, was the district's high school prior to 1966. It was later used as the first Scranton Middle School, until a newer facility was built. As of 2025 it is The Bridge alternative high school, the Tot Spot, and an administrative building.

A new Brighton High School opened in fall 1966. By 1970, the community was debating replacing the high school due to growing enrollment. Instead, the high school capacity was increased from 800 to 1,900 with the construction of additions in 1974. The architect was Daverman Associates.

Lindbom Elementary School was closed in 2010 due to new budget cuts and was demolished in 2023.

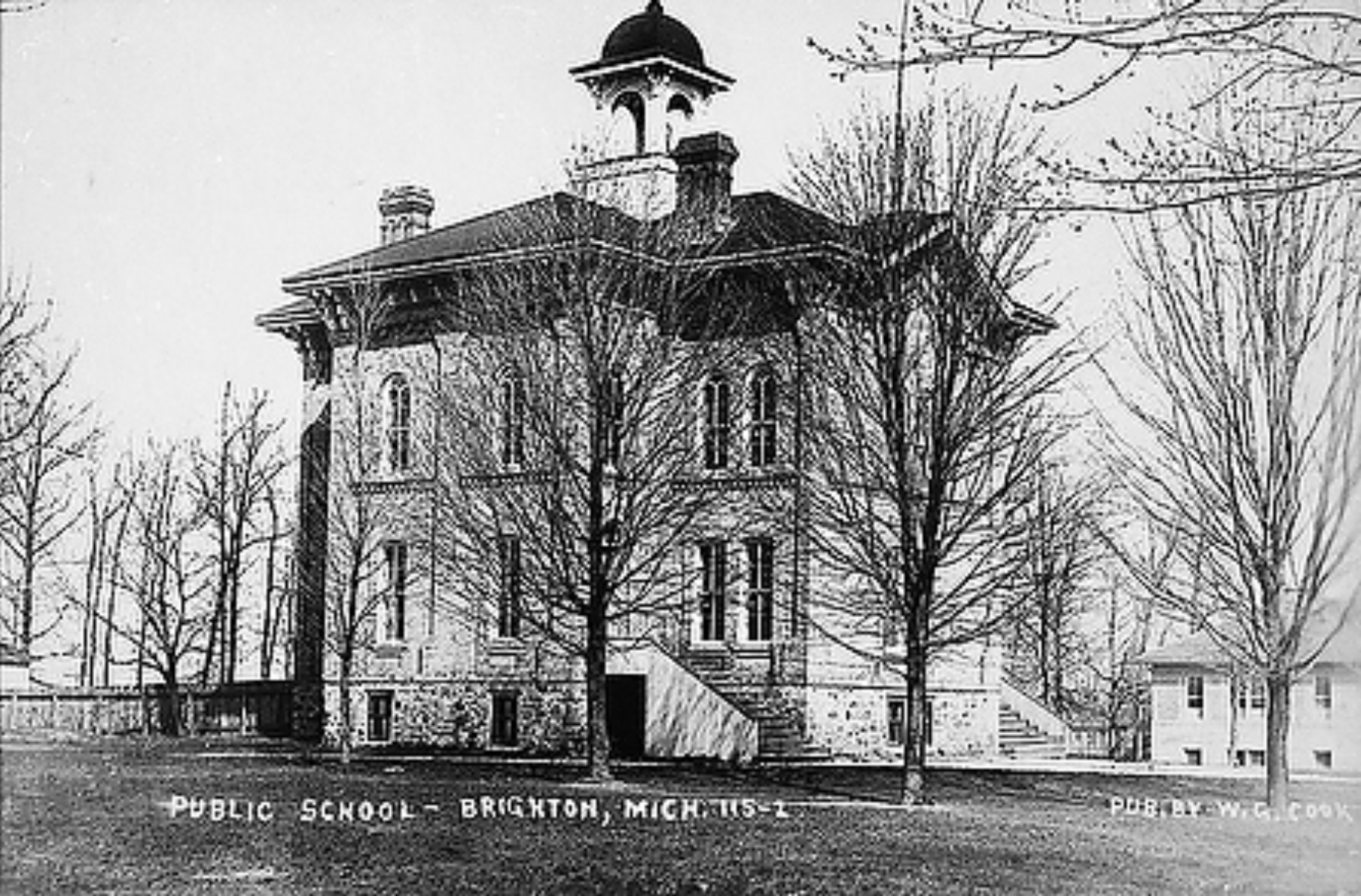
"Union high School" First school in Brighton in 1928, built in 1868.

== Schools ==
Schools in Brighton Area School District
School	Address	Notes
High School
Brighton High School	7878 Brighton Rd., Brighton	Grades 9-12
The Bridge	125 S. Church St., Brighton	Alternative high school, grades 9-12. Housed in former Scranton Middle School.
Intermediate/Middle Schools
Maltby Intermediate School	4740 Bauer Rd., Brighton	Grades 5 and 6
Scranton Middle School	8415 Maltby Rd., Brighton	Grades 7 and 8
Elementary Schools
Hawkins Elementary School	8900 Lee Rd., Brighton	Grades K-4
Hilton Road Elementary School	9600 Hilton Rd., Brighton	Grades K-4
Hornung Elementary School	4680 Bauer Rd., Brighton	Grades K-4
Spencer Road Elementary School	10639 Spencer Rd., Brighton	Grades K-4
Tot Spot	125 S. Church St., Brighton	Early childhood education

== Sports ==
Known as the Brighton Bulldogs, Brighton teams play in the Kensington Lakes Conference.
