= Frank A Buckless =

American business educator

- Born: April 9, 1958 (age 68); Providence, Rhode Island, U.S.
- Title: Stephen P. Zelnak Dean Poole College of Management
- Awards: "Outstanding Auditing Dissertation" awarded by the American Accounting Association in 1990

Academic background
- Education: Michigan State University
- Thesis: Modeling External Auditors' Evaluations of Audit Risk and the Effect of the Task Environment on Consensus. (1989)
- Doctoral advisor: D. Dewey Ward

Academic work
- Discipline: Business education
- Sub-discipline: Accounting, Auditing
- Institutions: North Carolina State University, Arthur Andersen,
- Notable works: Auditing Cases: An Interactive Learning Approach, Comprehensive Assurance and Systems Tool: An Integrated Auditing and AIS Simulation

Frank A Buckless (born April 9, 1958) is an American business educator, textbook editor and author, as well as consultant who is known for his expertise in auditing. Buckless is the Stephen P. Zelnak Dean of the Poole College of Management at North Carolina State University.

== Background ==
Buckless was born on April 9, 1958, in Providence, Rhode Island, to Mary and Gerald Buckless. Buckless' father started his career as an accountant as did his maternal grandfather. Buckless grew up in a large family with five sisters and two brothers. Five of his siblings are also educators.

== Education and early career ==
Buckless attended Brighton High School in Brighton, Michigan, where he graduated in 1977.

In 1981, Buckless graduated with a Bachelor of Arts in Accounting from the Michigan State University (MSU) Eli Broad College of Business. Buckless was an intern at Deloitte, Haskins & Sells in 1980 where he gained an appreciation of auditing. In that same time frame, Buckless was a teaching assistant for the MSU Introductory accounting course. While at MSU, Buckless also served as the President of the Beta Alpha Psi international honor organization. Buckless was also a member of the Varsity Wrestling Team.

Following graduation, Buckless went to work for Arthur Andersen & Co. in Atlanta, Georgia where he began to specialize in auditing processes.

Buckless remained at Arthur Andersen & Co. until 1981 when he returned to MSU to complete a PhD in Accounting. His love of teaching accounting practices continued as a graduate assistant and teaching assistant during his graduate studies. Buckless completed his PhD in 1989 and published his thesis entitled "Modeling External Auditors' Evaluations of Audit Risk and the Effect of the Task Environment on Consensus". This thesis was recognized as the "Outstanding Auditing Dissertation" which is awarded by the American Accounting Association - Auditing Section in 1990.

== North Carolina State University ==
In 1989, Buckless moved to Raleigh, North Carolina to take an Assistant Professor position at North Carolina State University. His promotion to Associate Professor occurred in 1995. Buckless' position was endowed in 2000 where he was named the "KPMG Professor of Accounting and Department Head".

Screen shot of auditing training environment in Second Life

Buckless oversaw the $500,000 donation by to Ernst & Young the Accounting Department was the largest ever for a project implementing the Second Life virtual platform into the curriculum in 2009. This funding was utilized by Buckless along with Mr. Scott Showalter and Dr. Kathy Krawczyk to create a virtual warehouse for their students to audit. The data collected from this study showed that students improved "inventory observation knowledge, interviewing, audit documentation, critical thinking, and group work skills". This project follows incorporation of cost and financial accounting activities in virtual environments.

Buckless performs many duties for the university and is a face for Management faculty at NCSU. Though he was not on the search committee, Buckless was interviewed over concerns in finding a new Dean for the NCSU College of Management in 2004. In 2010, Buckless was part of the search committee for a new university provost. He has served on over 20 different committees while at NC State.

The American Accounting Association appointed Buckless as the president of the Accounting Programs Leadership Group for 2014-2015.

== Consulting ==
Buckless provides consulting services for many activities including litigation, fraud, and valuations. He has consulted for many companies as well as the United States Department of Justice and North Carolina Department of Justice. He provides training for KPMG auditors and is faculty for the Auditor Educator Bootcamp hosted by the American Accounting Association.

== Honors and awards ==
Buckless earned the "Outstanding Auditing Dissertation" awarded by the American Accounting Association in 1990.

The College of Management Board of Governors Award for Excellence in Teaching was given to Buckless in 1998.

In 2016, Buckless, along with Poole faculty members Kathy Krawczyk and Scott Showalter, received the Innovation in Accounting Education Award from the American Accounting Association.

== Publications ==
Buckless has served as a case editor for the Journal of Accounting Education, an associate editor for Issues in Accounting Education, and on the editorial boards for several journals throughout his career. In addition to his leadership work with the journal, Buckless has also served and an ad hoc reviewer for several journals and meeting proceedings.

The Auditing and Assurance Services, 14th Edition textbook edited by Arens, Elder and Beasley acknowledges Buckless as a reviewer.

=== Books ===
Buckless is an editor for several textbooks used in higher education and industry. Many of these have multiple editions.

- Bartley, J. W.; B. C. Branson; F. A. Buckless (1998). Controllers Guide to External Reporting Standards. Denton, TX. Professional Development Institute.
- Buckless, F. A.; M. S. Beasley; S. M. Glover; D. F. Prawitt (2000). Teaching Notes and Solutions Manual to Auditing Cases. Upper Saddle River, NJ. Prentice Hall.
- Buckless, F. A.; M. S. Beasley; S. M. Glover; D. F. Prawitt (2000). Auditing Cases. Upper Saddle River, NJ. Prentice Hall.
- Beasley, M. S.; F. A. Buckless. (2002). MoviesDoorToDoor.com: How Accounting Helped Make the Difference. Upper Saddle River, NJ. Prentice Hall.
- Buckless, F. A.; L. R. Ingraham & J. G. Jenkins (2004). Comprehensive Assurance and Systems Tool: An Integrated Auditing and AIS Simulation – Manual Accounting Information System Module. Upper Saddle River, NJ. Prentice Hall.
- Buckless, F. A.; L. R. Ingraham & J. G. Jenkins (2004). Comprehensive Assurance and Systems Tool: An Integrated Auditing and AIS Simulation – Computerized Information System Module. Upper Saddle River, NJ. Prentice Hall.
- Buckless, F. A.; L. R. Ingraham & J. G. Jenkins (2004). Comprehensive Assurance and Systems Tool: An Integrated Auditing and AIS Simulation – Assurance Module. Upper Saddle River, NJ. Prentice Hall.
- Buckless, F. A.; L. R. Ingraham & J. G. Jenkins (2004). Comprehensive Assurance and Systems Tool: An Integrated Auditing and AIS Simulation – Instructor Solution Manual. Upper Saddle River, NJ. Prentice Hall.
- Beasley, M. S.; F. A. Buckless; S. M. Glover; D. F. Prawitt (2015). Auditing Cases: An Interactive Learning Approach, 6th Edition. Upper Saddle River, NJ. Pearson.
- Beasley, M. S.; F. A. Buckless; S. M. Glover; D. F. Prawitt (2015). Auditing Cases: Instructor Resource Manual, 6th Edition. Upper Saddle River, NJ (PDF). Pearson. Archived from the original (PDF) on 2016-10-10.
- Beasley, M. S.; F. A. Buckless; S. M. Glover; D. F. Prawitt (2019). Auditing Cases: An Interactive Learning Approach, 7th Edition. Upper Saddle River, NJ. Pearson.

The Auditing cases book compiled by the Technical Working Group on Education in Fraud and Forensic Accounting is a suggested reading for forensic accounting.
