= Mattress World of Michigan =

Retail chain

- Type: Private
- Founded: 1996
- Headquarters: Genoa Charter Township, Michigan
- Number of locations: 0
- Area served: Michigan & Indiana
- Products: Mattress
- Number of employees: 100
- Parent: Art Van
- Website: mattressworldmichigan.com

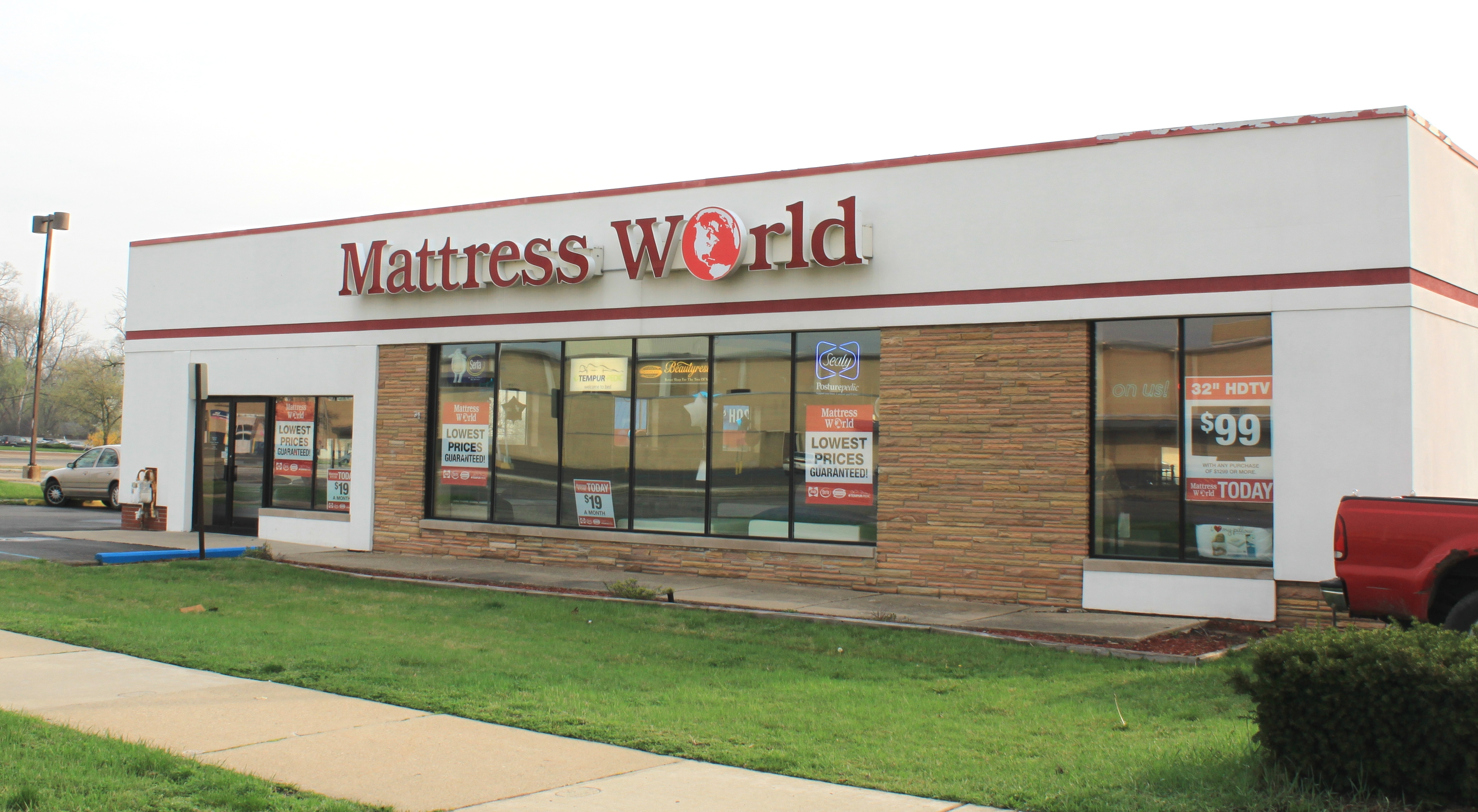
Mattress World store, Livonia, Michigan

Mattress World, Inc. or Mattress World of Michigan was a mattress retail chain in Michigan and Indiana in the Midwestern United States. Its headquarters were in Genoa Township, Michigan. Stores were usually freestanding and located in bedroom communities instead of big box store corridors.

== History ==
Founded in 1996, its first store opened in Howell, Michigan in 1998.

In 2002, Mattress World had three stores in Michigan. Mattress World was, according to a Furniture Today article, the apparent high bidder for six Mattress Discounters stores in Metro Detroit; Mattress Discounters was exiting the Michigan market. By 2009, the company had 22 locations.

In 2011, the chain had 28 stores, with 21 in Michigan and 7 in Indianapolis. One of its Michigan stores was located in Ann Arbor. At the time, it had 100 employees.

== Acquisition ==
In May 2009, it acquired seven Mattress Gallery stores in Indianapolis; the Mattress Gallery stores, previously owned by the Indianapolis-based Today's Bedroom One, had closed in April 2009. The stores reopened as Mattress World locations in June 2009.

In May 2011, Mattress World of Michigan was acquired by Art Van which said it would keep the Mattress World name and the employees. Art Van stated that it may re-brand some stores as Art Van PureSleep. The acquisition of Mattress World gave Art Van its first stores outside of Michigan. The price of the acquisition was not disclosed. Art Van assigned Armando Murillo, previously the employee who established Pure Sleep operations outside of Michigan, as the vice president operating Mattress World.

In 2013, the Mattress World went bankrupt, with the majority re-opened as Art Van PureSleep stores.
