= Brighton Recreation Area =

Protected recreation area in Michigan, United States

Brighton State Recreation Area
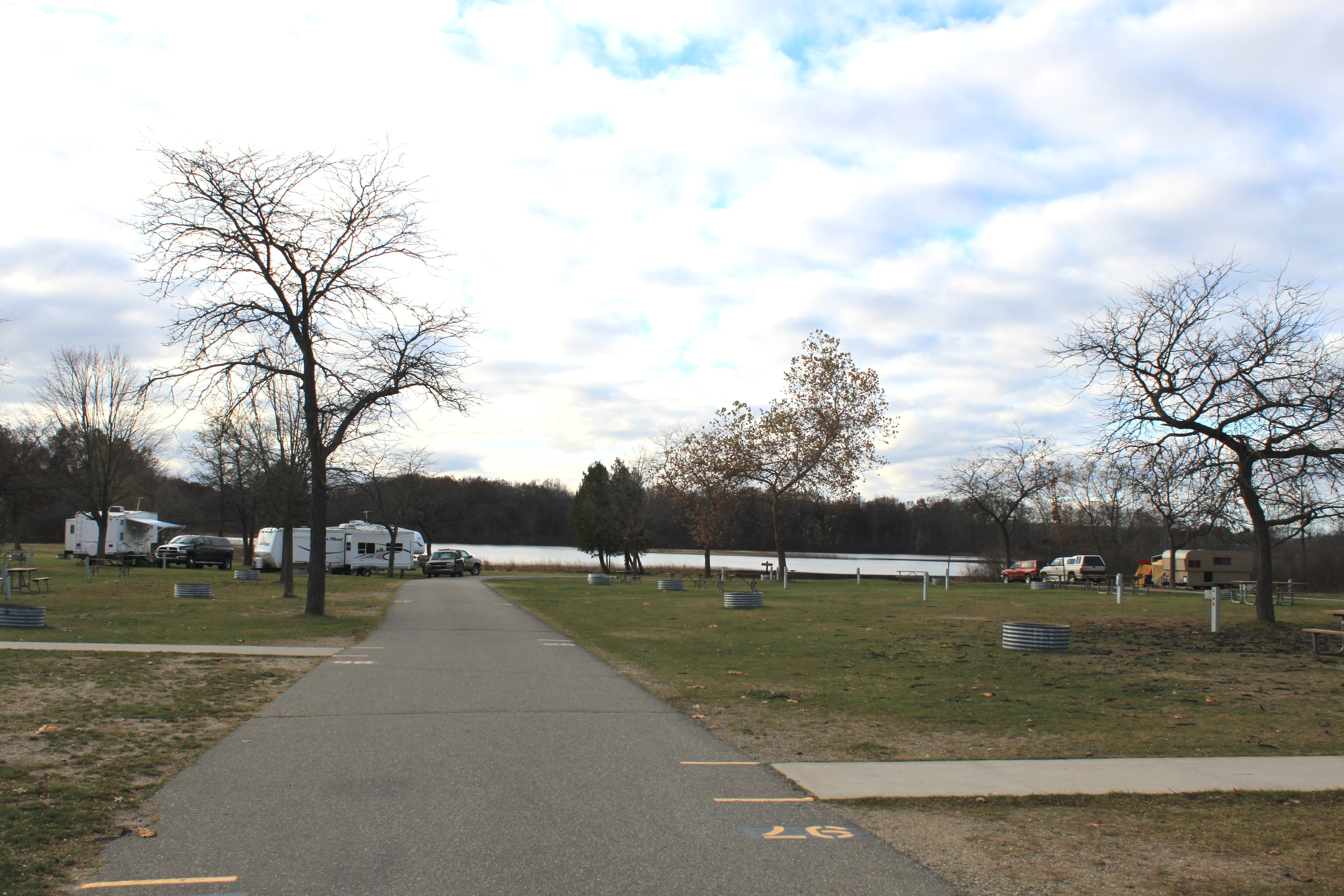
- Bishop Lake Campground

- Location within Michigan Location within the United States
- Location: Hamburg Township, Livingston County, Michigan, USA
- Nearest city: Brighton, Michigan
- Coordinates: 42°30′39″N 83°50′42″W
- Area: 4,947 acres (8 sq mi; 2,002 ha)
- Governing body: Michigan Department of Natural Resources
- Website: Official website

Brighton State Recreation Area is an 4,947-acre (20.02 km^{2}) recreation area, located near Mount Brighton ski area in Livingston County, Michigan. It has 39 miles of trails for mountain biking, hiking, skiing and horse riding. There are 3 campgrounds providing over 200 campsites. It is also close to many other state parks, such as Pinckney State Recreation Area.
