= Tim Alberta =

American journalist & writer (born 1986)

- Born: January 26, 1986 (age 40)
- Education: Michigan State University
- Occupations: Journalist; author
- Children: 3
- Writing career
- Subject: American politics

Tim Alberta (born January 26, 1986) is an American journalist and author. He has written articles for The Hotline, the Wall Street Journal, National Journal, National Review, Politico, and The Atlantic.

== Early life and education ==
Tim Alberta was born to parents Richard and Donna Alberta. With his family, he moved when he was five years old from New York state to Brighton, Michigan, where his father had been named as pastor of Cornerstone Evangelical Presbyterian Church. Alberta graduated from Brighton High School in 2004 and from Michigan State University in 2008 with a degree in journalism and political science.

== Career ==
After college, Alberta interned for the Wall Street Journal; by 2017, he was an established journalist in Washington. He worked for National Review before joining Politico and later The Atlantic.

In 2019, Alberta published his first book, American Carnage: On the Front Lines of the Republican Civil War and the Rise of President Trump. Shortly afterward, his father died, and upon returning to Michigan to attend the funeral, he was reprimanded by several members of his father's church who objected to his coverage of Trump; one congregant said Alberta was "part of an evil plot [...] out to undermine God's ordained leader of the United States". Disturbed by this experience, Alberta began studying the relationship between American Evangelical Christianity and the radical right, which became the subject of his next book, The Kingdom, the Power, and the Glory: American Evangelicals in an Age of Extremism, published in 2023.

In 2023, Alberta profiled then-CNN chief executive officer Chris Licht and his rocky tenure as CEO. Alberta's reporting eventually led to Licht's firing five days later.

== Personal life ==
As of 2024, Alberta lives in Michigan. He and his wife have three children.

== Bibliography ==
External videos
- Presentation by Alberta on American Carnage, July 18, 2019, C-SPAN
- Washington Journal interview with Alberta on American Carnage, July 21, 2019, C-SPAN
- After Words interview with Alberta on The Kingdom, the Power, and the Glory, December 15, 2023, C-SPAN

- American Carnage: On the Front Lines of the Republican Civil War and the Rise of President Trump. HarperCollins. 2019. ISBN 9780062896360.
- The Kingdom, the Power, and the Glory: American Evangelicals in an Age of Extremism. HarperCollins. 2023. ISBN 9780063226906.
