= Brighton High School (Brighton, Michigan) =

American secondary education institution

Coordinates: 42.5261°N 83.7946°W

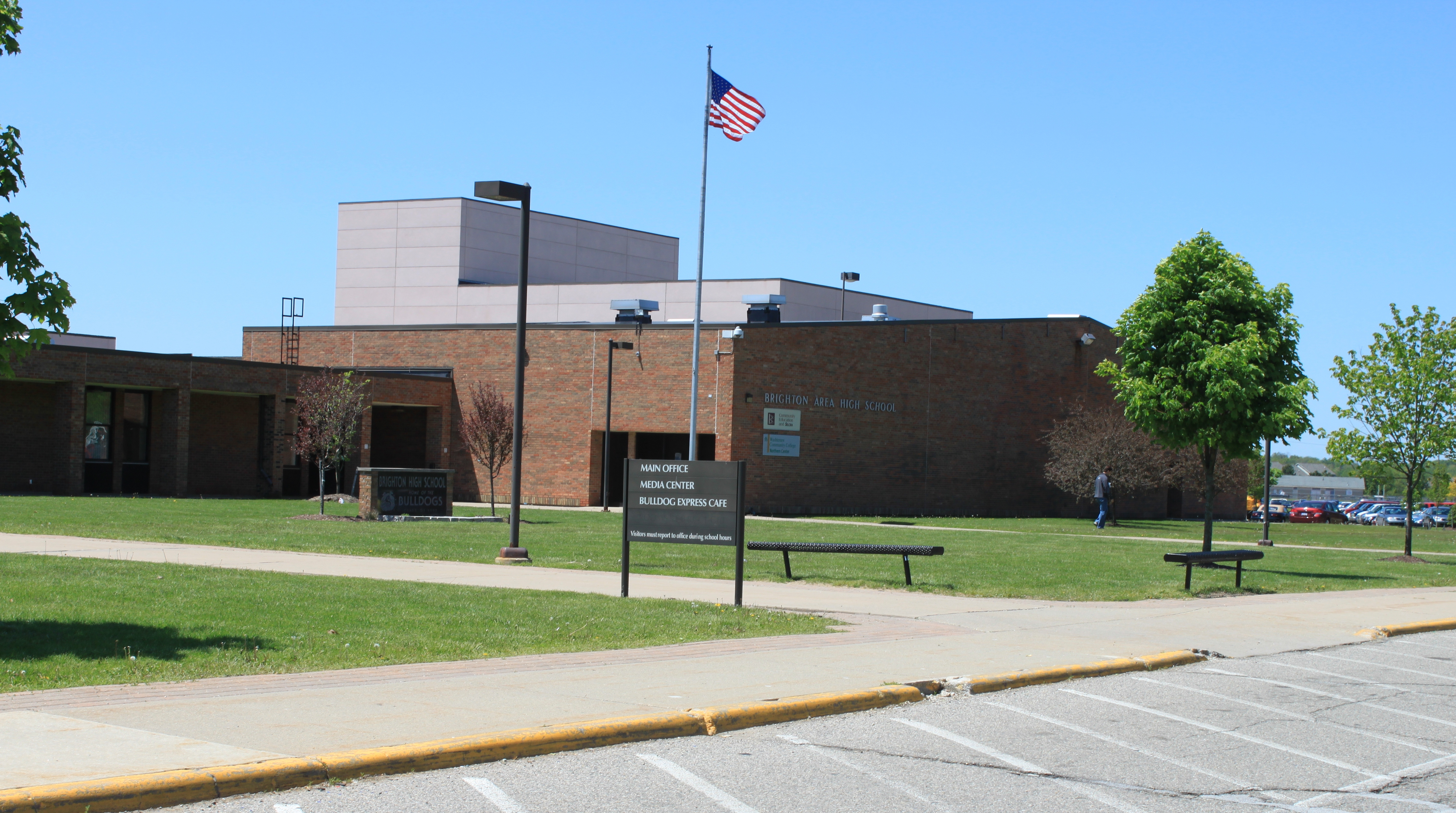
- 7878 Brighton Road; Brighton, MI 48116

Information
- Type: Public high school
- School district: Brighton Area Schools
- Superintendent: Matt Outlaw
- Principal: Matt Evans
- Teaching staff: 102.90 (on an FTE basis)
- Grades: 9-12
- Enrollment: 1,901 (2023-2024)
- Student to teacher ratio: 18.47
- Colors: Orange; Black
- Athletics: MHSAA Class A
- Athletics conference: Kensington Lakes Activities Association
- Team name: Bulldogs
- Yearbook: Brightonian
- Website: www.brightonk12.com/schools/bhs

Student assessments
- 2021–22 school year Change vs. prior year

M-STEP 11th grade proficiency rates (Science / Social Studies)
- Advanced %: 25.3 / 19.9
- Proficient %: 27.8 / 30.2
- PR. Proficient %: 16.1 / 37.9
- Not Proficient %: 30.7 / 12.0

Average test scores
- SAT Total: 1086.6 (▲ +4.6)

Brighton High School is a public secondary school located in Brighton, Michigan. BHS is part of the Brighton Area School system.

The school gained national attention after being recognized by ESPN as a leader in Special Olympics in 2018.

== Academics ==
Brighton High School is ranked as the 1,309th best high school in America per U.S. News. The site also credits BHS as being the 38th best high school in Michigan and the 15th best in the Detroit Metro Area. As of 2024, 56% of students participated in Advanced Placement courses and 42% of students passed at least one AP exam. According to state testing, 57% of students are proficient in math, 53% are proficient in sciences, and 75% are proficient in reading. The graduation rate is 98%.

== Nutrition ==
Students at BHS have the option to be served breakfast and lunch. There is also a "snack bar" with snacks such as popcorn and ice cream. The school's cafeteria is set up into different restaurants, including Chopstix, which serves stir fry, La Pizzeria, which serves pizza, and 7th street deli, which serves wraps and submarine sandwiches. The eating quarters was renovated during the 2024-2025 school year.

== Athletics ==
Brighton High School is a member of the Michigan High School Athletic Association (MHSAA). Brighton has been part of the West Division of the Kensington Lakes Activities Association since 2008, when the Kensington Valley Conference merged with the Western Lakes Activities Association. The Brighton varsity football team became the first Livingston County team ever to advance to the state finals in the 2019 season. In 2023, the boys soccer team reached the state finals. In 2025, the boys basketball team won their first district championship since 2008.

=== Rugby ===
Brighton's most recent rugby state championship was during the 2016 season when they took home the Michigan Youth Rugby Association (MYRA) Division II State Championship. As of 2017, there are 26 teams in the MYRA. Brighton won MYRA Division I State Championships in 2002 and 2006, and also won the MYRA Division II Championship in 2008.

== Notable alumni ==
- Drew Henson, former NFL player (Dallas Cowboys, Minnesota Vikings, Detroit Lions) and MLB player (New York Yankees)
- Tim Alberta, staff writer for The Atlantic magazine, former Chief Political Correspondent for POLITICO, and former reporter for National Review, National Journal and The Wall Street Journal
- Frank A Buckless, Stephen P. Zelnak Jr. Dean at North Carolina State University’s Poole College of Management
- Charlie Sharp, soccer player
