= Decision Pending =

Sculpture

Coordinates: 42.52966°N 83.7825°W

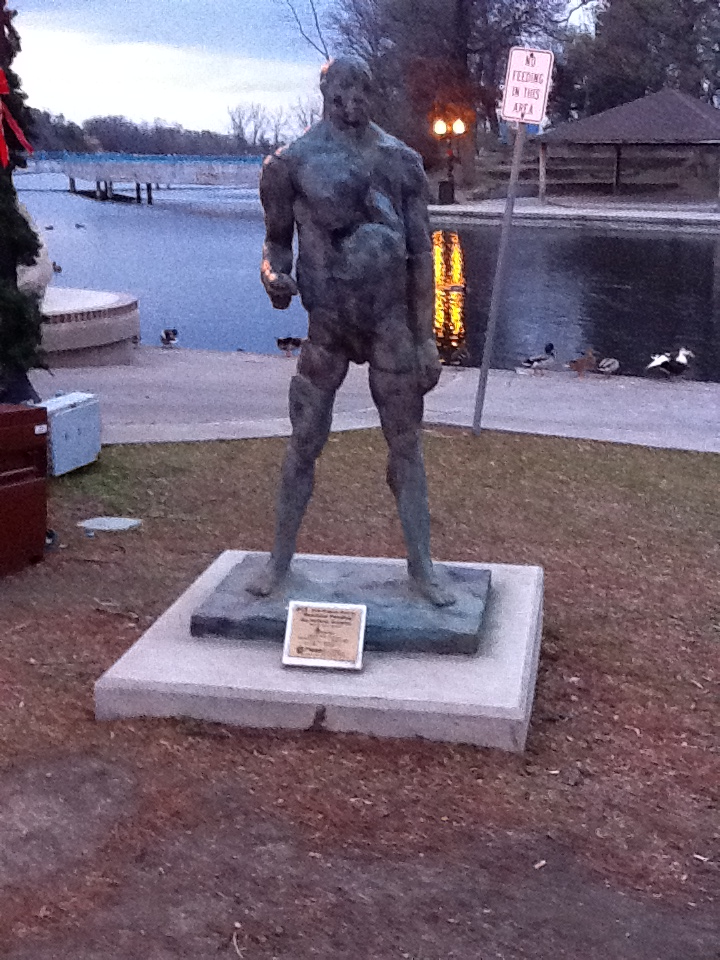
Decision Pending

Decision Pending is a bronze sculpture located in the city of Brighton, Michigan. The statue is located near the Brighton Mill Pond Park on the North side of Main Street; it stands at five feet tall and is 20 inches wide. The statue is a dis-proportioned naked man standing upright. The statue was created by artist Jay Holland and was donated to the city by a citizen’s group as part of the 2006 Brighton Biennial, a project designed to fill the downtown area with pieces of outdoor art. Due to its controversial subject matter and its proximity to the Brighton World War 2 memorial the sculpture has been the topic of much public debate and has been the topic of many articles in the Livingston County Daily Press & Argus.

== Public reception ==
=== Controversy ===
The public reception to Decision Pending has been mixed. Since its purchase in 2006 the statue has seen petitions to have it removed as well as counter-petitions to keep it in its current location. The statue has been the source of much controversy in Brighton. The statue is a point of controversy because many residents feel that its subject matter is not appropriate for public viewing and that its proximity to the Brighton World War II memorial is disrespectful. The Brighton city council has discussed relocating the statue on several occasions. As of today the statue is still standing in its original position.

=== Tradition ===
The statue's presence and the controversy surrounding it have prompted the development of many local traditions and customs. It is common for local groups and individuals in Brighton to dress or decorate the statue during holidays, festivals or sporting events. The statue's appearance has earned it several nicknames including "the elephant man" and "ugly naked guy" or simply "U.N.G." which has become a part of the Brighton area lexicon. The nickname "Ugly Naked Guy" was originally coined by Buddy Moorehouse, writer and founder of the Community Journal, a local paper.

=== Vandalism ===
The statue has long been a target of vandalism, it has been written on, dented, and was once knocked off its pedestal. As a result, the statue now sits on a stronger stand.
