= Brighton, Michigan =

Brighton
- City
- City of Brighton
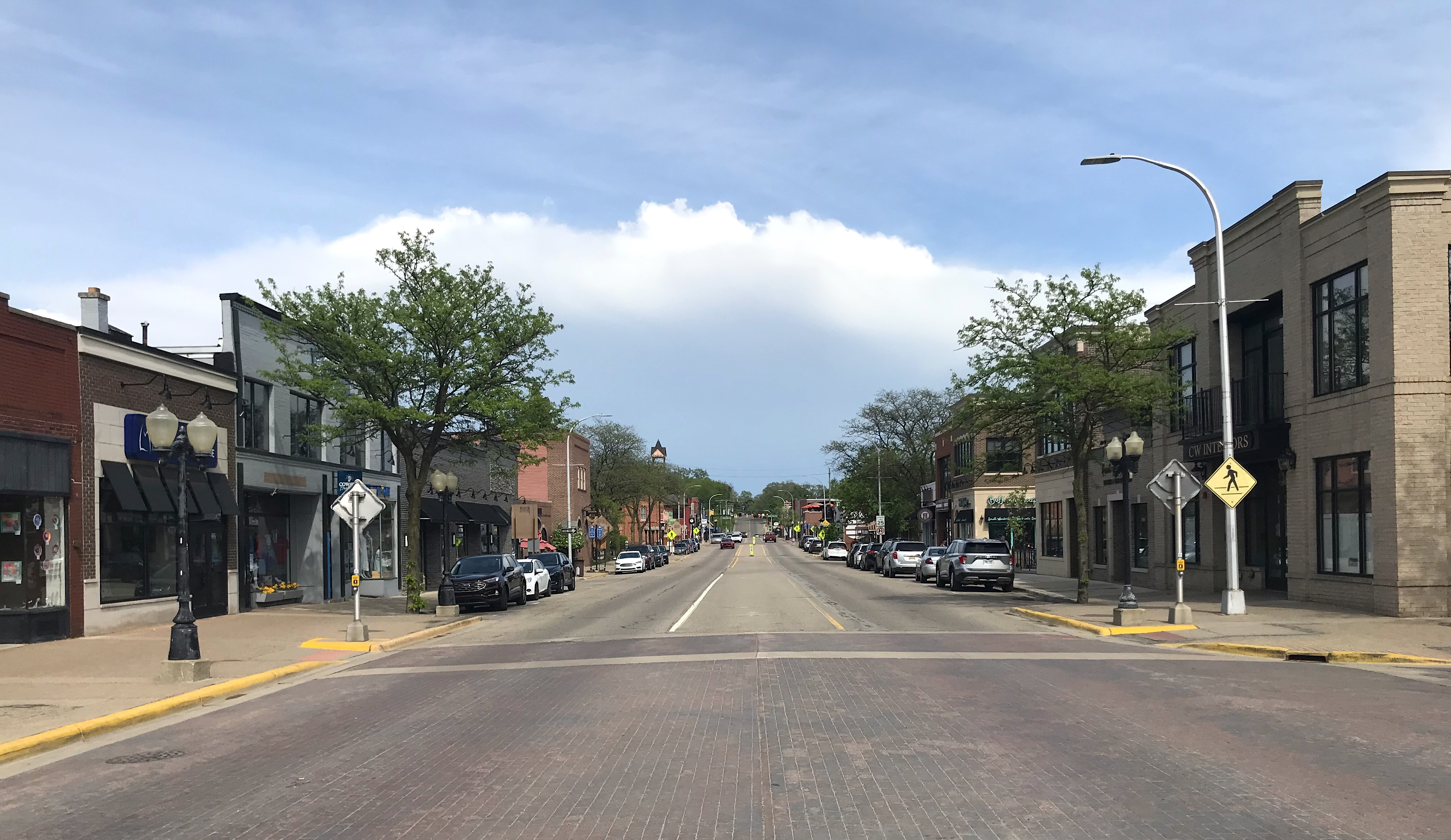
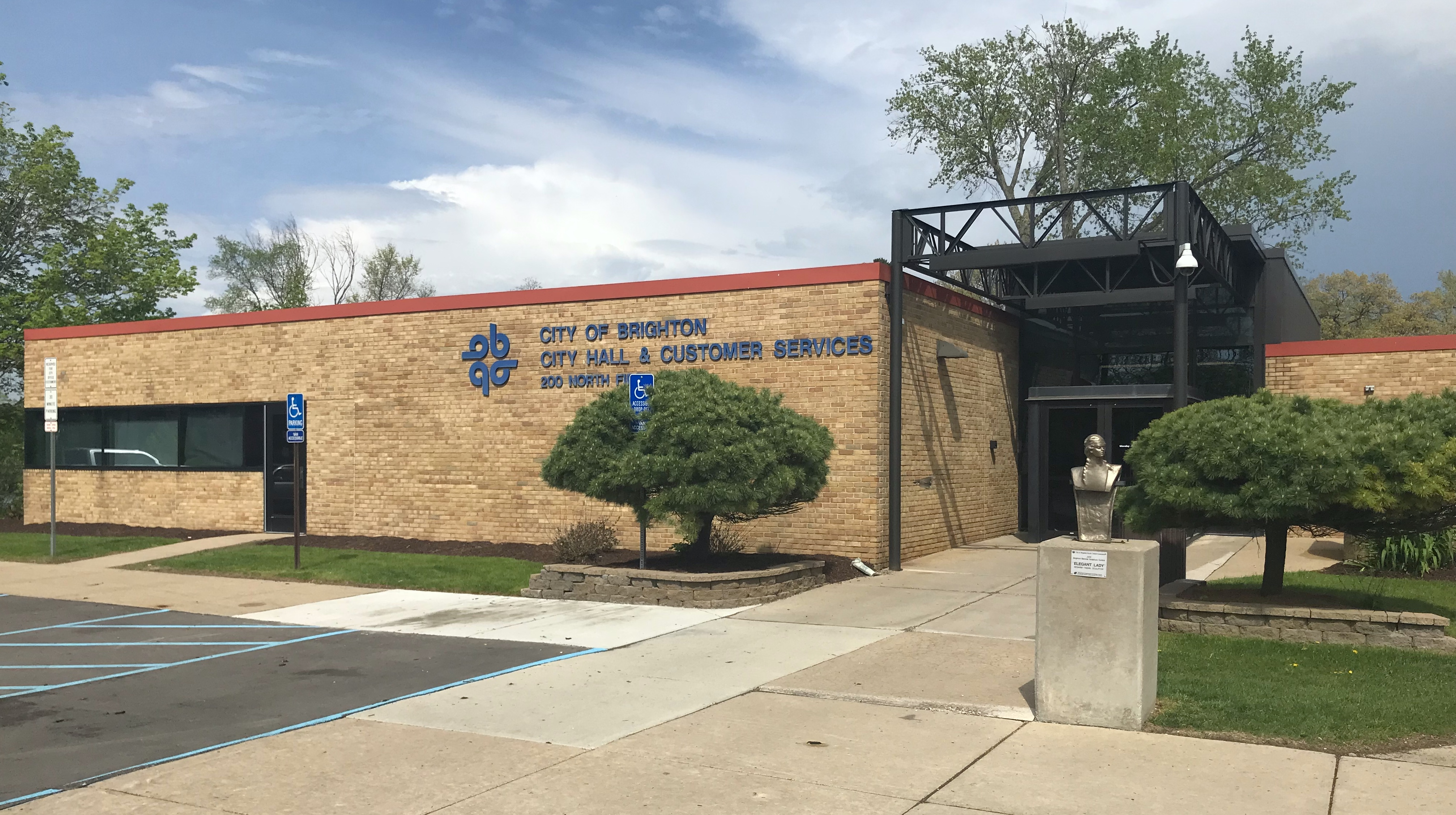
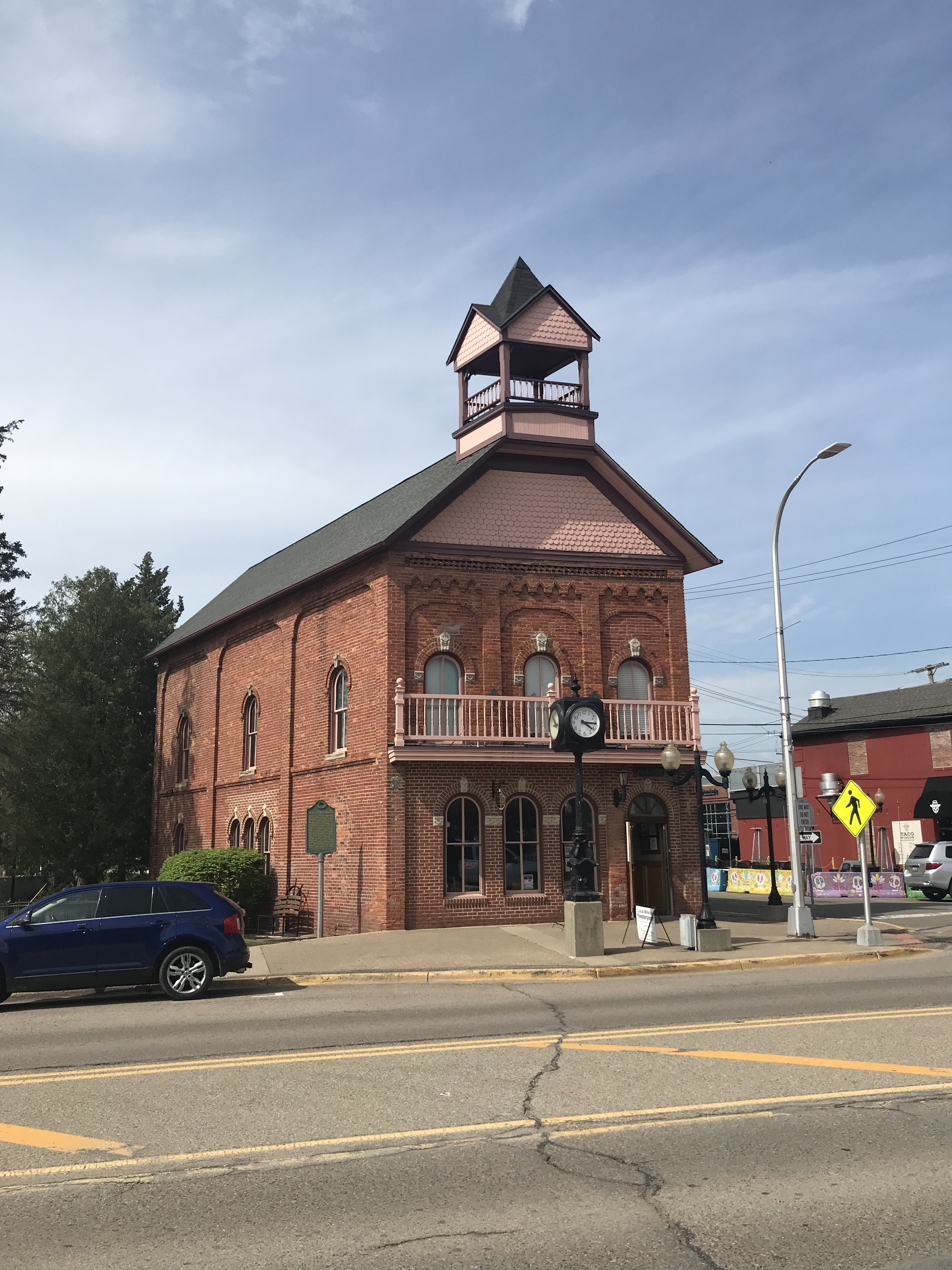
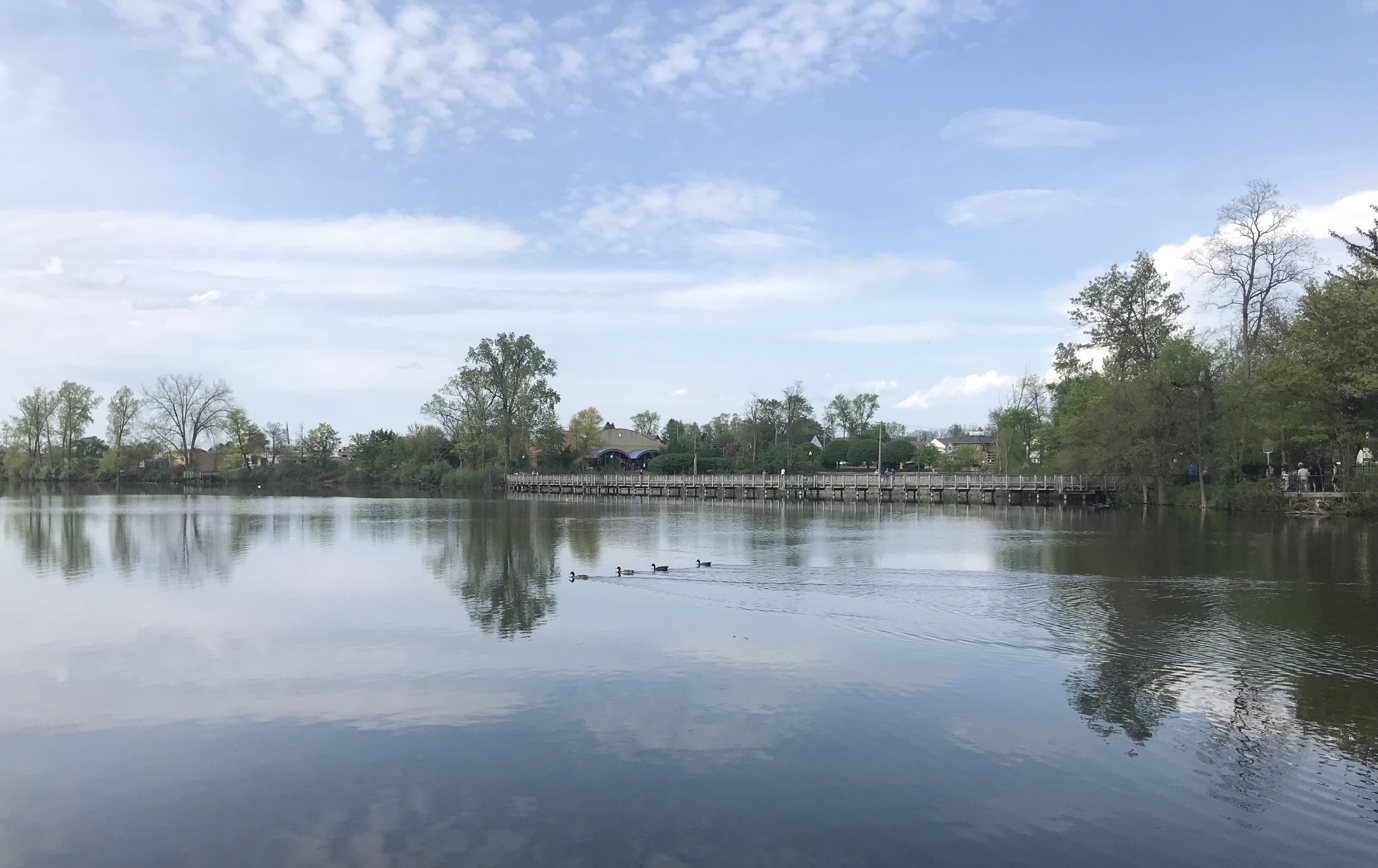
- Left to right, from top: Downtown Brighton, Brighton City Hall, Old Town Hall, and South Ore Creek

- Flag Logo
- Motto: "Where quality is a way of life"
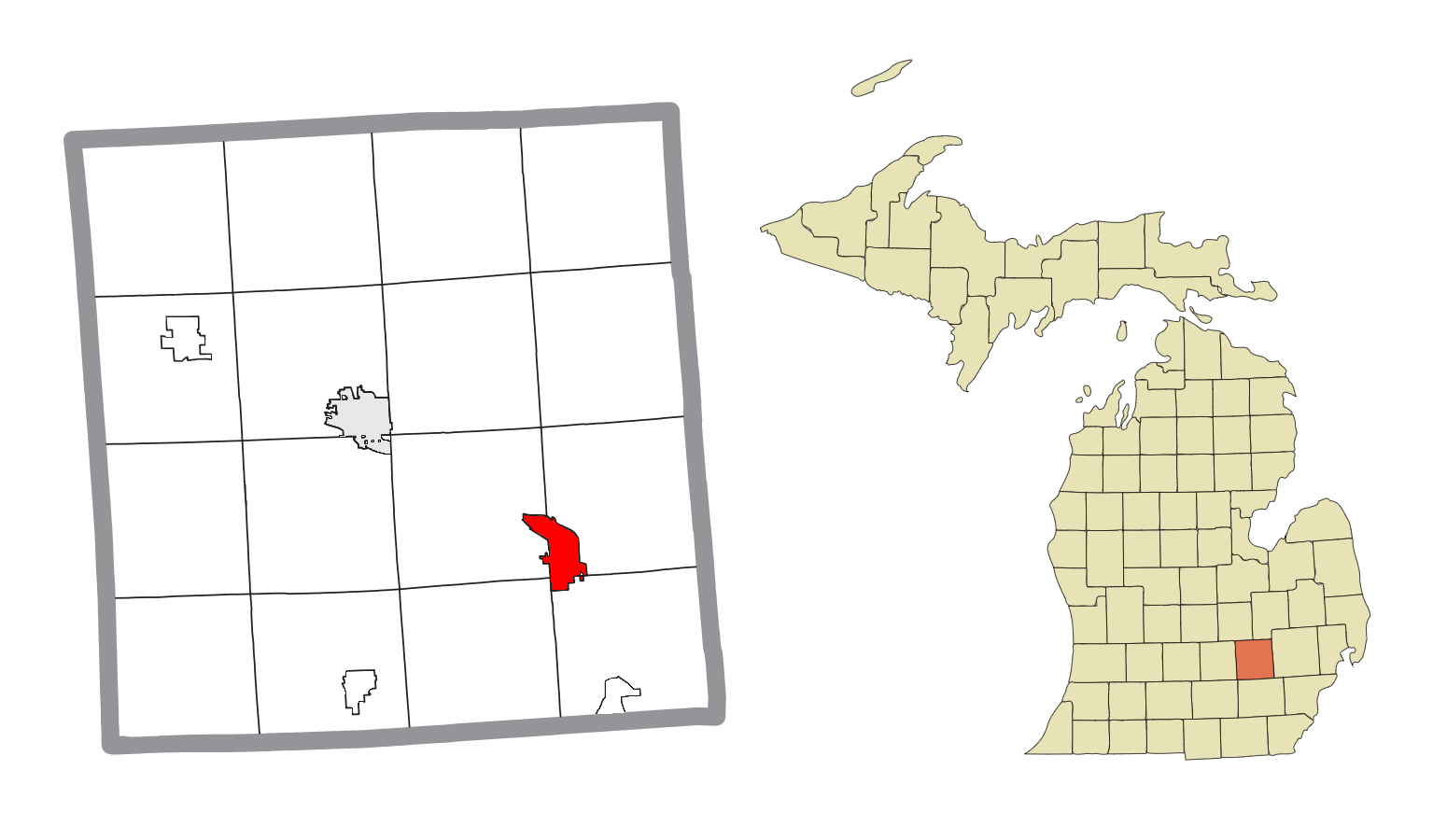
- Location within Livingston County

- Location in Michigan Location in the United States
- Coordinates: 42°31′36″N 83°47′02″W
- Country: United States
- State: Michigan
- County: Livingston
- Settled: 1832
- Incorporated: 1867 (village); 1928 (city)

Government
  - Type: Council–manager
  - Mayor: Kristoffer Tobbe (I)
  - Mayor pro-tem: James Bohn
  - Manager: Gretchen Gomolka
  - Clerk: Tara Brown

Area
  - Total: 3.69 sq mi (9.56 km^{2})
  - Land: 3.51 sq mi (9.10 km^{2})
  - Water: 0.18 sq mi (0.46 km^{2})
- Elevation: 925 ft (282 m)

Population (2020)
  - Total: 7,446
  - Density: 2,118.8/sq mi (818.06/km^{2})
- Time zone: UTC-5 (Eastern (EST))
  - Summer (DST): UTC-4 (EDT)
- ZIP code(s): 48114, 48116
- Area codes: 248 and 810
- FIPS code: 26-10620
- GNIS feature ID: 0621987
- Website: www.brightoncitymi.gov

Brighton is a city in Livingston County in the U.S. state of Michigan. As of the 2020 census, its population was 7,446. Brighton forms part of the South Lyon-Howell-Brighton Urban Area. It is one of two incorporated cities in Livingston County and incorporates land that was part of Brighton, Green Oak, and Genoa townships.

== History ==
Brighton was established in 1832. It was incorporated as a village in 1867 and as a city in 1928.

== Geography ==
=== Topography ===
According to the United States Census Bureau, the city has an area of 3.69 square miles (9.56 km^{2}), of which 3.56 square miles (9.22 km^{2}) is land and 0.13 square miles (0.34 km^{2}) is water.

=== Transportation ===
Major Thoroughfares

- I-96
- US 23
- Grand River Avenue

==== Rail ====
- CSXT

=== Climate ===
Brighton exhibits what is known as a continental climate biome. Within the heart of the Great Lakes region, Brighton weather ranges from warm summers with occasional thunderstorms to cold, dry winters with moderate to heavy snowfall.

Climate data for Brighton, Michigan
Month	Jan	Feb	Mar	Apr	May	Jun	Jul	Aug	Sep	Oct	Nov	Dec	Year
Record high °F (°C)	66 (19)	67 (19)	79 (26)	86 (30)	92 (33)	101 (38)	100 (38)	98 (37)	96 (36)	88 (31)	78 (26)	64 (18)	101 (38)
Mean daily maximum °F (°C)	30 (−1)	33 (1)	43 (6)	56 (13)	68 (20)	77 (25)	82 (28)	79 (26)	72 (22)	59 (15)	46 (8)	34 (1)	57 (14)
Mean daily minimum °F (°C)	14 (−10)	16 (−9)	24 (−4)	35 (2)	47 (8)	56 (13)	60 (16)	59 (15)	51 (11)	40 (4)	31 (−1)	20 (−7)	38 (3)
Record low °F (°C)	−23 (−31)	−16 (−27)	−9 (−23)	11 (−12)	24 (−4)	33 (1)	41 (5)	38 (3)	26 (−3)	16 (−9)	−1 (−18)	−18 (−28)	−23 (−31)
Average precipitation inches (mm)	1.52 (39)	1.55 (39)	2.13 (54)	2.78 (71)	2.83 (72)	3.12 (79)	2.52 (64)	3.07 (78)	3.00 (76)	2.10 (53)	2.47 (63)	2.19 (56)	29.28 (744)
Source: WeatherChannel

== Demographics ==
Historical population
Census	Pop.	Note	%±
1860	252		—
1870	454		80.2%
1880	803		76.9%
1890	741		−7.7%
1900	781		5.4%
1910	767		−1.8%
1920	800		4.3%
1930	1,287		60.9%
1940	1,353		5.1%
1950	1,861		37.5%
1960	2,282		22.6%
1970	2,457		7.7%
1980	4,268		73.7%
1990	5,686		33.2%
2000	6,701		17.9%
2010	7,444		11.1%
2020	7,446		0.0%
U.S. Decennial Census

The city's median household income in 2009 was $47,668, and the median family income was $77,105. Males had a median income of $48,554 versus $30,877 for females. The city's per capita income was $29,781. Brighton's surrounding townships and communities, such as Brighton and Genoa Township, have median household incomes in excess of $90,000, making it one of the more prosperous places in Michigan. About 3.0% of families and 5.1% of the population were below the poverty line, including 5.9% of those under age 18 and 5.2% of those age 65 or over in the 2000 census.

=== 2020 census ===
As of the 2020 census, Brighton had a population of 7,446. The median age was 47.6 years. 16.0% of residents were under the age of 18 and 26.8% of residents were 65 years of age or older. For every 100 females there were 87.8 males, and for every 100 females age 18 and over there were 85.6 males age 18 and over.

100.0% of Brighton residents lived in urban areas.

There were 3,743 households in Brighton, of which 19.6% had children under age 18 living in them. Of all households, 38.3% were married-couple households, 20.5% were households with a male householder and no spouse or partner present, and 34.5% were households with a female householder and no spouse or partner present. About 42.1% of all households were made up of individuals and 21.9% had someone living alone who 65 or older.

There were 4,001 housing units, of which 6.4% were vacant. The homeowner vacancy rate was 1.0% and the rental vacancy rate was 6.5%.

Racial composition as of the 2020 census
Race	Number	Percent
White	6,871	92.3%
Black or African American	46	0.6%
American Indian and Alaska Native	19	0.3%
Asian	91	1.2%
Native Hawaiian and Other Pacific Islander	12	0.2%
Some other race	59	0.8%
Two or more races	348	4.7%
Hispanic or Latino (of any race)	228	3.1%

=== 2010 census ===
At the 2010 census the city had 7,444 people, 3,603 households, and 1,811 families. The population density was 2,091.0 inhabitants per square mile (807.3/km^{2}). There were 3,905 housing units at an average density of 1,096.9 per square mile (423.5/km^{2}). The city's racial makeup was 96.0% White, 0.7% African American, 0.4% Native American, 1.1% Asian, 0.6% from other races, and 1.2% from two or more races. Hispanic or Latino of any race were 2.3%.

There were 3,603 households, of which 22.3% had children under the age of 18 living with them, 38.2% were married couples living together, 8.9% had a female householder with no husband present, 3.1% had a male householder with no wife present, and 49.7% were non-families. 42.7% of households were one person and 19.8% were one person aged 65 or older. The average household size was 2.02 and the average family size was 2.81.

The median age was 43.4 years. 19% of the city's population was under age 18; 7.1% was between age 18 and 24; 26% was from age 25 to 44; 26.1% was from 45 to 64, and 21.7% were age 65 or older. The city's gender makeup was 46.2% male and 53.8% female.

=== 2000 census ===
At the 2000 census the city had 6,701 people, 3,103 households, and 1,746 families. The population density was 1,857.0 inhabitants per square mile (717.0/km^{2}). There were 3,241 housing units at an average density of 898.2 per square mile (346.8/km^{2}). The city's racial makeup was 99.76% White, 0.034% African American, 0.042% Native American, 0.21% Asian, 0.39% from other races, and 0.0093% from two or more races. Hispanic or Latino of any race were 1.48%.

There were 3,103 households, of which 25.7% had children under the age of 18 living with them, 44.3% were married couples living together, 9.1% had a female householder with no husband present, and 43.7% were non-families. 37.8% of households were one person and 15.5% were one person aged 65 or older. The average household size was 2.15 and the average family size was 2.87.

21.7% of the city's population was under age 18, 8.5% was from age 18 to 24, 31.9% was from age 25 to 44, 21.4% was from age 45 to 64, and 16.6% was age 65 or older. The median age was 37 years. For every 100 females, there were 87.6 males. For every 100 females age 18 and over, there were 81.8 males.

== Government ==
The city of Brighton's wastewater treatment plant facility is in Hamburg Township and services the city of Brighton and parts of Genoa, Brighton, and Hamburg townships. The city's two water plants also serve the city and parts of Genoa, Brighton, and Hamburg townships.

Fire service for the city is provided through a separate governmental entity called the Brighton Area Fire Authority, which also serves the Townships of Brighton and Genoa.

Library services for the city are provided through a separate governmental entity called the Brighton District Library, which also serves the townships of Brighton, Genoa, and Green Oak.

Recreation services for the city are provided through a separate governmental entity called the Southeastern Livingston County Recreation Authority, which also serves the townships of Brighton, Genoa, and Green Oak, as well as the Brighton Area Schools.

== Business district ==
Though small, Brighton has many local businesses. Its major business districts are downtown and on either side of town. Brighton has two major shopping malls: Brighton Mall on the north side of town off of I-96 Exit 145 is a former enclosed mall that was rebuilt in 1996 as a power center, and Green Oak Village Place is a lifestyle center complex on the east side of town.

Several initiatives to revitalize downtown, such as streetscape improvements and displayed art, have been well received. A bronze nude, Decision Pending, purchased as part of the 2006 Brighton Biennial, generated some controversy and an unsuccessful campaign to relocate it.

== Notable people ==
- Tim Alberta, journalist and author
- Aaron Dilloway, experimental musician and owner of Hanson Records
- Harold Falls (1909–2006), ophthalmologic geneticist, died in Brighton
- Drew Henson, quarterback for the Houston Texans, Dallas Cowboys, Minnesota Vikings, and Detroit Lions; attended Brighton High School
- Jonathon Merrill, defenseman for NHL's Minnesota Wild; was raised in Brighton
- Kyle Schultz, founder of MLW Wiffleball
- Mickey Stanley, center fielder for the Detroit Tigers; World Series champion (1968); lives in Brighton
- Morgan Trent, cornerback for the Cincinnati Bengals, Indianapolis Colts, Jacksonville Jaguars, and Washington Redskins; lived in Brighton

== Gallery ==
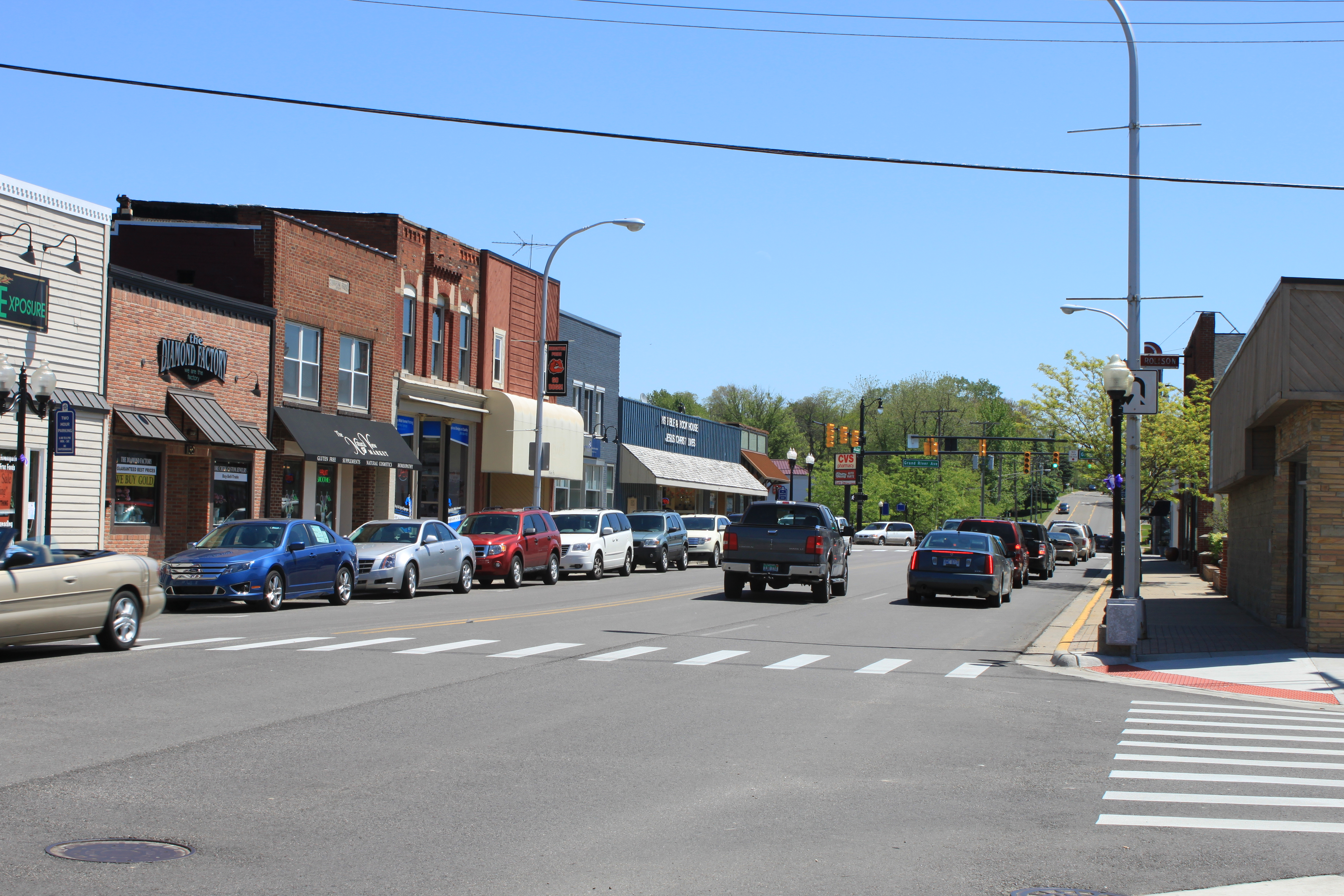
Downtown Brighton, Main St.

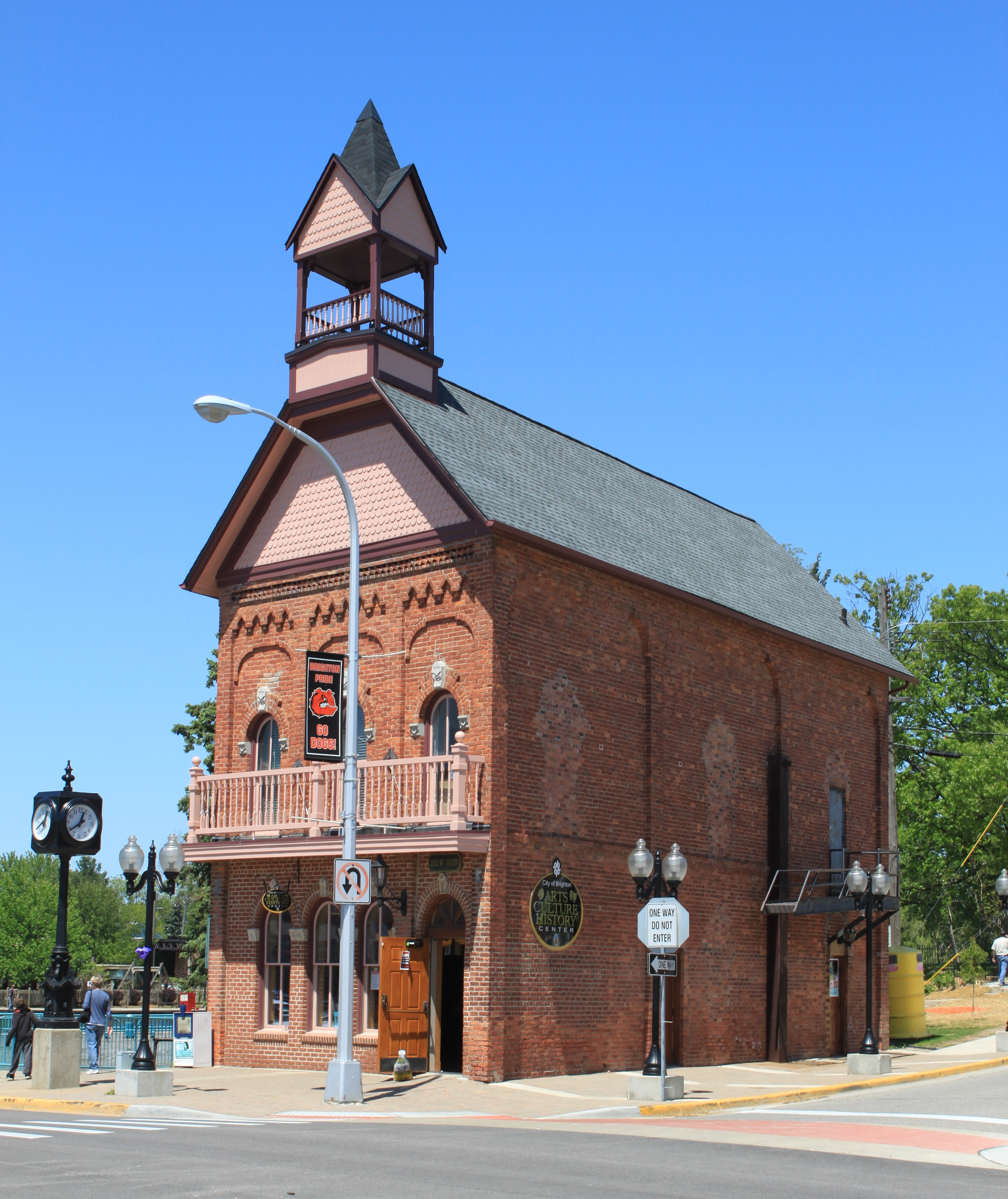
Old Town Hall

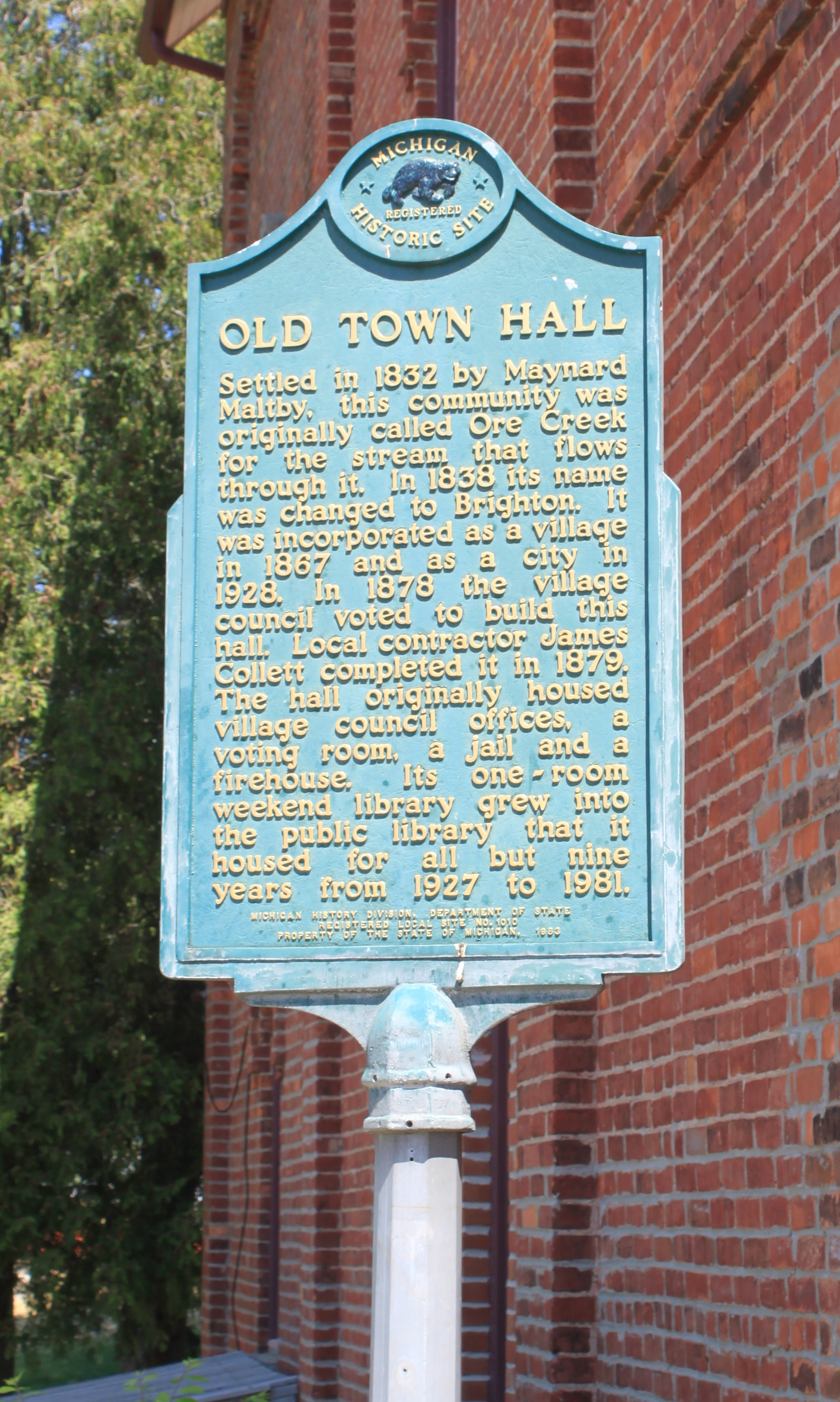
Old Town Hall historical marker

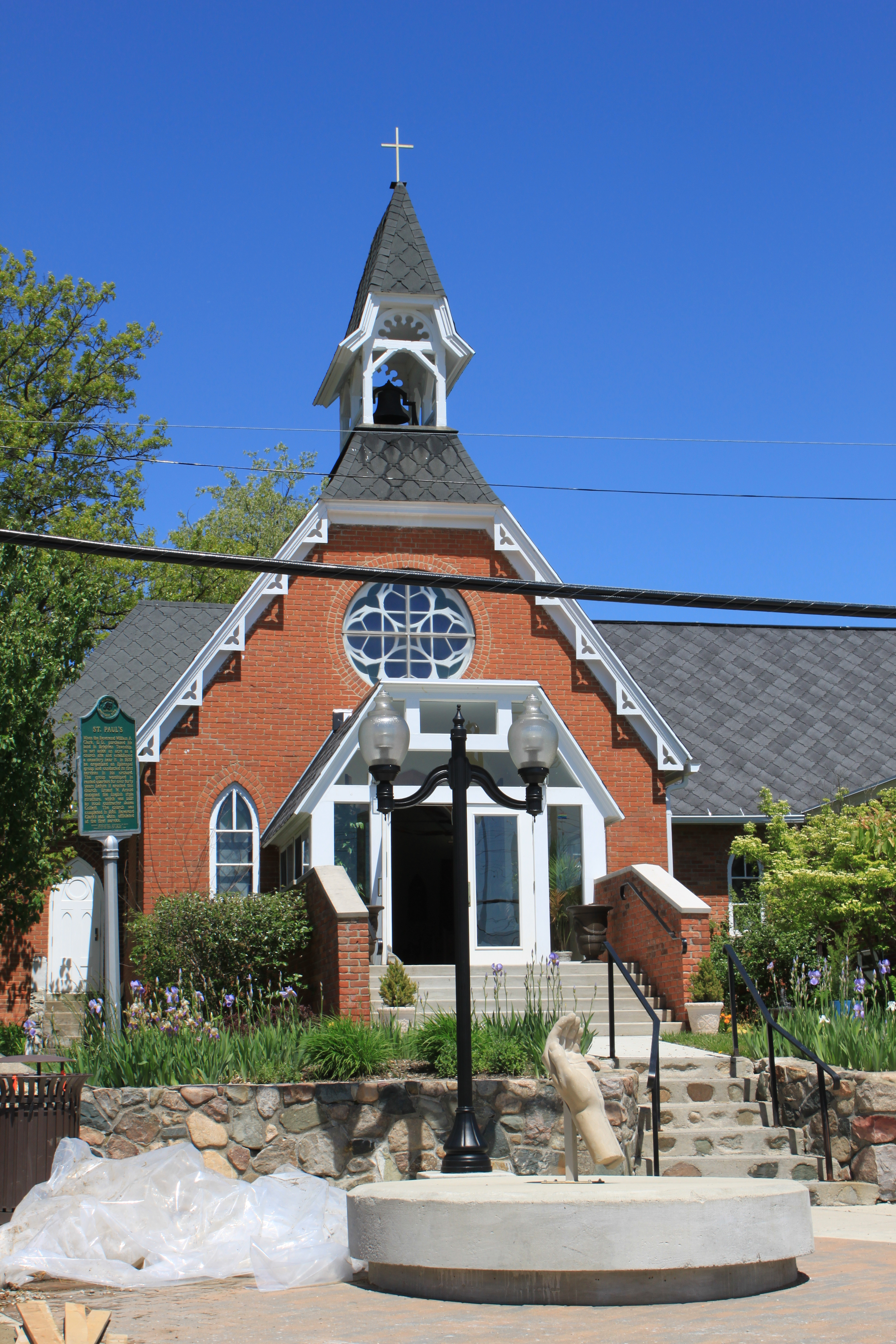
St. Paul's Episcopal Church

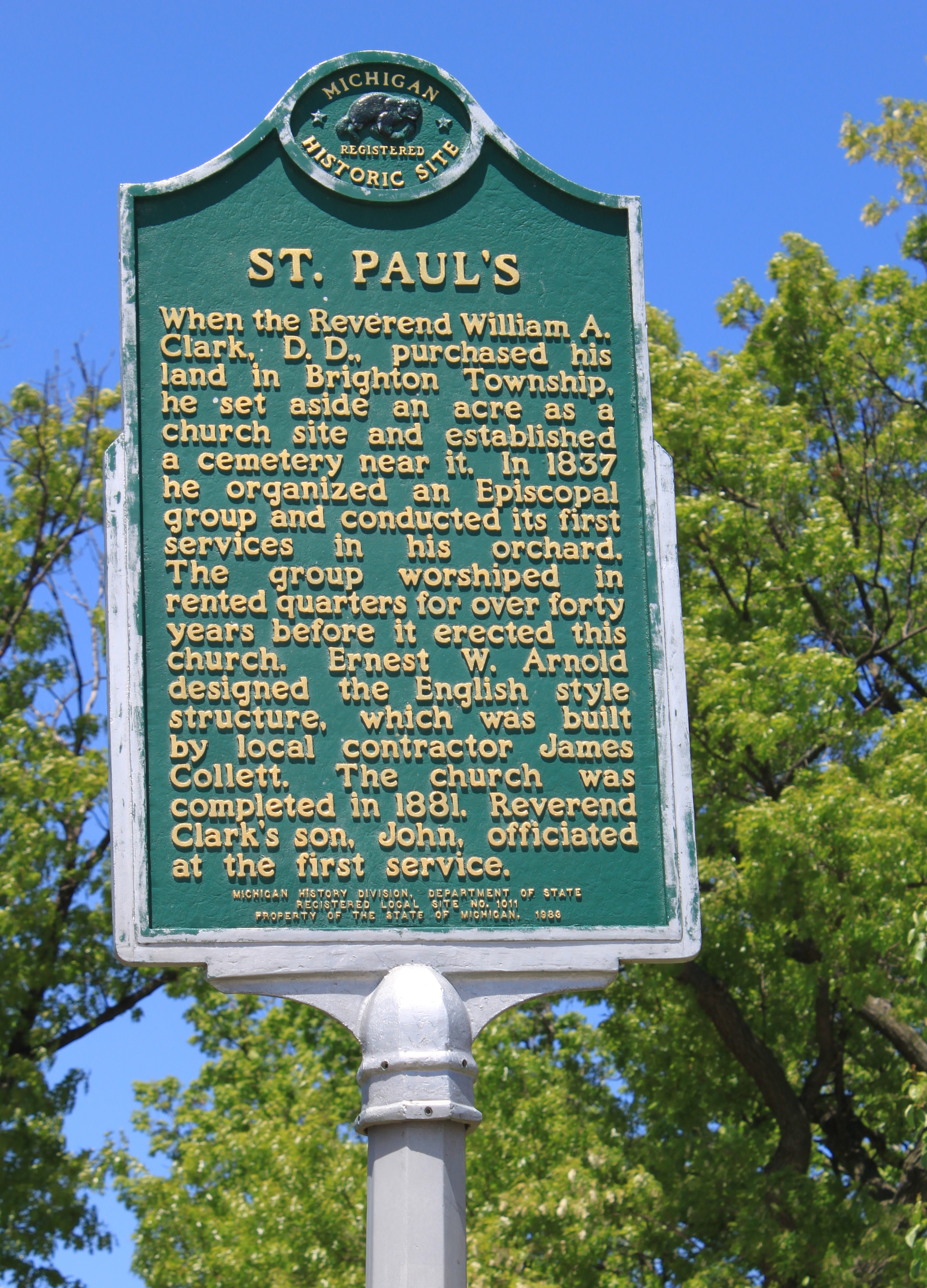
St. Paul's Episcopal Church historical marker

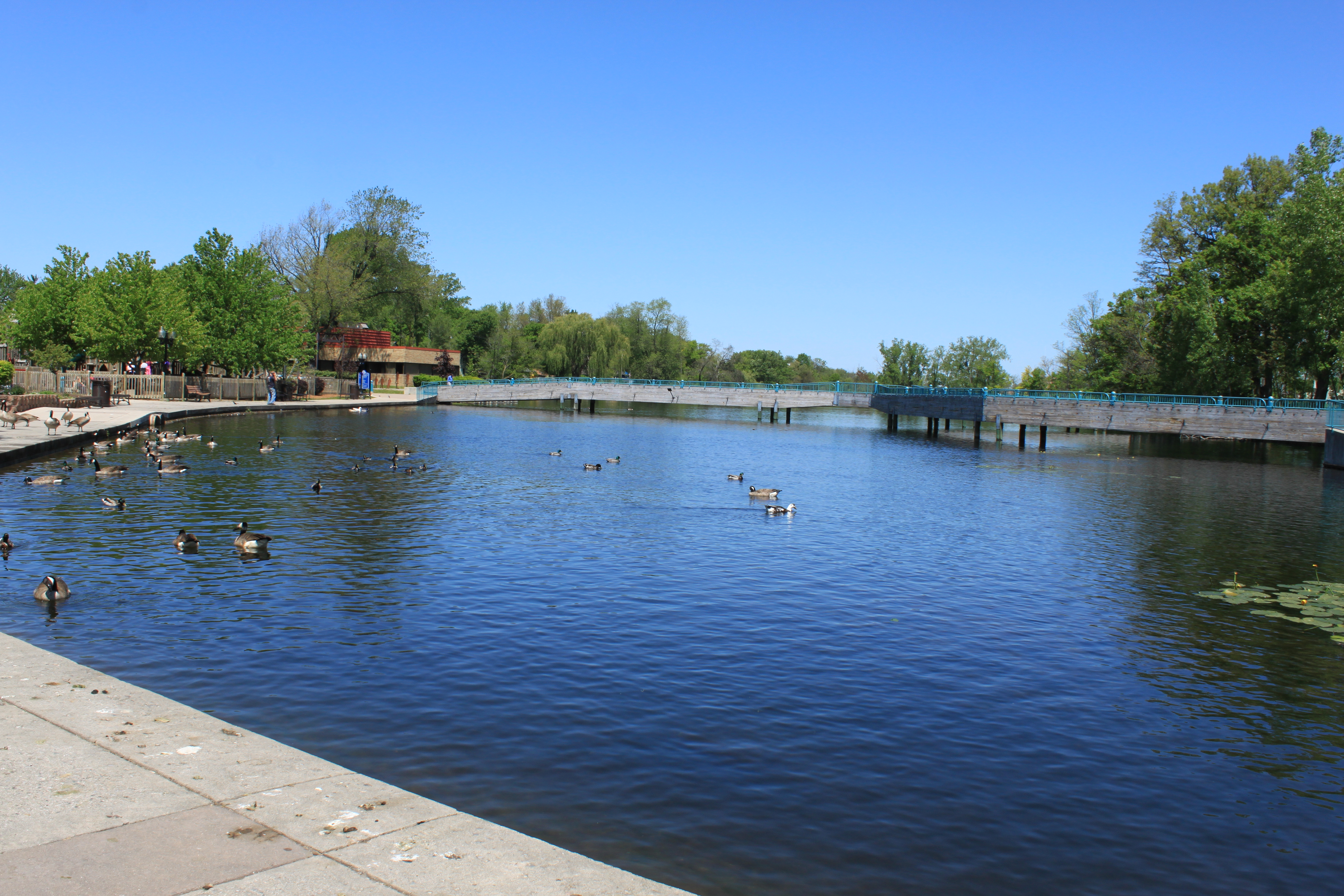
The millpond with the "Tridge" in view.

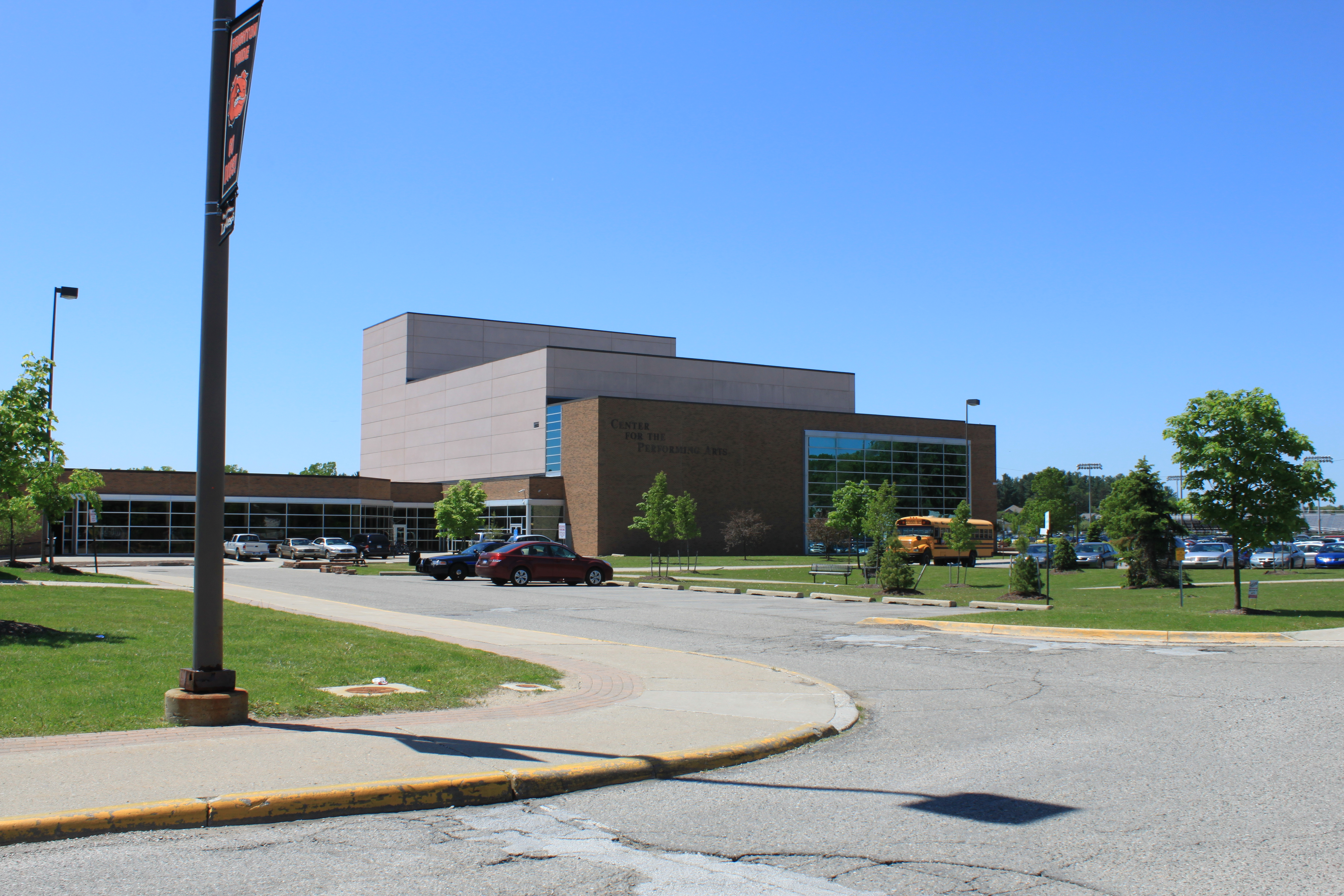
Brighton High School's Auditorium and Cafeteria

== Education ==
Brighton Area Schools has two middle schools—Scranton and Maltby—a high school, and four elementary schools. There are about 500 people per graduating class. There is one private high school, Livingston Christian High School. There are four private elementary and middle schools: St. Patrick Catholic School, Cornerstone Church and School, Holy Spirit Academy, and Shepherd of the Lakes Lutheran School. There are two charter Schools, Charyl Stockwell Academy Middle School and Charyl Stockwell Preparatory Academy High School (the elementary school is in nearby Hartland, Michigan).

== In popular culture ==
The analog horror series The Walten Files takes place in the Town of Brighton, in which the fictional restaurant called Bon's Burgers, alongside the also fictional Saint Juana Forest and K-9 Storage Facility, are located.
