= Bill Huffman =

American politician (1924–2019)

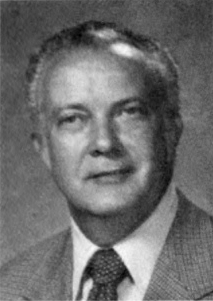

Member of the Michigan Senate from the 16th district
- In office 1975–1982
- Preceded by: Donald E. Bishop
- Succeeded by: Dana F. Wilson

Member of the Michigan House of Representatives
- In office 1963–1974
- Preceded by: John C. Hitchcock
- Succeeded by: Monte Geralds
- Constituency: Oakland County 6th district (1963–1964); 66th district (1965–1974)

Mayor of Madison Heights
- In office 1961–1963
- Preceded by: Theodore Krenn
- Succeeded by: Herbert A. Smith

Personal details
- Born: December 27, 1924 Estelle, Georgia, U.S.
- Died: July 10, 2019 (aged 94) Madison Heights, Michigan, United States
- Party: Democratic
- Children: four
- Education: Asbury College (attended); Lawrence Institute (attended)
- Occupation: salesman

William S. Huffman (December 27, 1924 – July 10, 2019) was an American politician from the state of Michigan. Huffman served as mayor of Madison Heights, Michigan from 1961 to 1963. He then served in the Michigan House of Representatives, where he represented Oakland County's 6th district from 1963 to 1964, and then the 66th state House district from 1965 to 1974. He then served in the Michigan Senate, where he represented the 16th district from 1975 until his resignation in 1982.
