= Tom Jankiewicz =

American screenwriter

Thomas Anthony Jankiewicz (September 8, 1963 – January 23, 2013) was an American screenwriter. He was best known for writing the 1997 film Grosse Pointe Blank, starring John Cusack, Minnie Driver, Alan Arkin, and Dan Aykroyd, which tells the story of an assassin who returns to his hometown for his 10-year high school reunion.

== Biography ==
=== Early life ===
Jankiewicz's mother, Marilyn, was a nurse, while his father, Anthony, was an engineer with Chrysler. He was born in Detroit, Michigan and lived in Sterling Heights, Michigan, with his parents and four siblings. One of his brothers was Pat Jankiewicz. Tom graduated from Bishop Foley Catholic High School in Madison Heights, Michigan, in 1981. He then moved to Southern California after high school when his father took a new job with General Dynamics in Pomona, California. Tom Jankiewicz also worked as an advertising copywriter.

=== Grosse Pointe Blank ===
Jankiewicz wrote the initial script for Grosse Pointe Blank in 1991 after receiving an invitation to his 10th high school reunion. He picked the film's title, "Grosse Pointe Blank", while substitute teaching for an English class at Upland High School by writing the title on the classroom's whiteboard to see how it would look on a movie theater. Jankiewicz decided to use Grosse Pointe, an upscale Michigan suburb, rather than his working-class hometown of Sterling Heights due to the contrast between the two towns.

Jankiewicz simultaneously worked as a substitute teacher and a cashier at a Big Lots (located at the corner Foothill and Mountain streets in Upland, California) before his script was picked up for production.

Jankiewicz based many of the characters in Grosse Pointe Blank on real life friends from Michigan and his high school. For example, Jeremy Piven's character, Paul Spericki, was originally named after Jankiewicz's best friend during high school, though the name was changed during filming. Joan Cusack's character, Marcella, was named for Jankiewicz's manager at Big Lots. An erroneous urban legend emerged under the premise that the film's script was based on an actual high school student from Jankiewicz's past who became a professional hit man, which was untrue.

Jankiewicz shared the co-writing credits of Grosse Pointe Blank with John Cusack, Steve Pink, and D.V. DeVincentis. In 1997 interview, Cusack stated that he would have liked to film on-location in Jankiewicz's home state of Michigan, but they couldn't move production there due to budgetary constraints. Therefore, Grosse Pointe Blank was primarily shot in Monrovia, California, which substituted for Michigan in the film.

=== Other projects ===
After the success of Grosse Pointe Blank, Jankiewicz spent the next fifteen years writing newspaper articles and working as an advertising copywriter. He worked as a "script doctor," editing and improving screenplays written by other screenwriters.

In September 2000, Jankiewicz scored his biggest sale with the spec script, "Kung Fu Theater," to Mandalay Pictures. The potential film, which Jankiewicz pitched as a combination of Enter the Dragon and Pleasantville, follows the story of a "slacker" who becomes trapped in a kung fu movie from the 1970s. The comedy was picked up by DreamWorks, with Marlon Wayans and Jamie Foxx attached to star at one point, but remained in development

Jankiewicz was finishing a novel at the time of his death. He was also near the completion of a new film script based on the 1961 Goldsboro B-52 crash.

=== Death ===
On January 23, 2013, Jankiewicz attended a screening of Grosse Pointe Blank held at his brothers' alma mater, California State University, San Bernardino (CSUSB) at the invitation of Professor James C. Kaufman. Kaufman called him that morning to invite him to attend the class that evening. The screening was attended by approximately seventy-five students of Kaufman's "Psychology and the Movies." Jankiewicz collapsed during a question-and-answer session held after the film. He was rushed to Community Hospital of San Bernardino, where he was pronounced dead at 10:51 p.m. at the age of 49. He was a resident of Upland, California.
