= Grosse Pointe Blank =

- Theatrical release poster
- Directed by: George Armitage
- Screenplay by: Tom Jankiewicz; D. V. DeVincentis; Steve Pink; John Cusack
- Story by: Tom Jankiewicz
- Produced by: Susan Arnold; Donna Arkoff Roth; Roger Birnbaum
- Starring: John Cusack; Minnie Driver; Alan Arkin; Dan Aykroyd
- Cinematography: Jamie Anderson
- Edited by: Brian Berdan
- Music by: Joe Strummer
- Production companies: Hollywood Pictures; Caravan Pictures; Roger Birnbaum Productions; Roth-Arnold Productions; New Crime Productions
- Distributed by: Buena Vista Pictures
- Release date: April 11, 1997
- Running time: 107 minutes
- Country: United States
- Language: English
- Budget: $15 million
- Box office: $31 million

Grosse Pointe Blank is a 1997 American black comedy romantic crime film directed by George Armitage and written by Tom Jankiewicz, D. V. DeVincentis, Steve Pink, and John Cusack. Based on a story written by Jankiewicz, it follows a professional assassin who leaves Los Angeles to attend a high school reunion in his hometown of Grosse Pointe, Michigan, where he reconnects with the girlfriend he abandoned on prom night. The film stars Cusack, Minnie Driver, and Dan Aykroyd.

The score was composed by Joe Strummer, formerly of the Clash, and the soundtrack features punk rock, ska, and new wave songs by artists including The Clash, the Specials, and Echo & the Bunnymen. The soundtrack album peaked at number 31 on the Billboard 200 and later prompted a second volume. Grosse Pointe Blank was released by Buena Vista Pictures on April 11, 1997. The film itself received positive reviews from critics and grossed $31 million on a $15 million budget.

== Plot ==
Martin Blank, a professional assassin based in Los Angeles, is preparing for a job when his assistant Marcella informs him that he has received an invitation to his ten-year high school reunion. Fellow assassin Grocer approaches Martin about joining his up-and-coming assassin's union, which Martin refuses as he prefers to work alone. On a job in Miami, Martin's attempt to stage his target's cause of death as natural causes goes wrong, and he is forced to shoot the target. His client demands that he make amends by killing a federal whistleblower in Detroit, close to his hometown of Grosse Pointe, where the reunion is taking place.

Martin discovers that his childhood home in Grosse Pointe has been replaced by a convenience store and that his widowed and estranged mother Mary, to whom he had been anonymously sending money, is living in a nursing home and has dementia. He reconnects with his childhood friend, Paul Spericki, and high school sweetheart, Debi Newberry, a local radio disc jockey whom he had abandoned on prom night to enlist in the army.

Martin is stalked by fellow hitman Felix LaPoubelle, who attempts to kill him by blowing up the convenience store. He is also followed by two NSA agents, Lardner and McCullers, who were tipped off to his contract by Grocer. Martin remains distracted by his desire to reconcile with Debi and procrastinates in opening the dossier on his target. Grocer tracks down Martin and tells him that Felix was hired by a wealthy dog owner whose prized retriever was killed on one of Martin's previous assignments. Martin replies that he knows Grocer made the agents follow him and again refuses to join the union.

Debi is conflicted about her feelings for Martin, but he persuades her to attend the reunion with him. There, the two rekindle their relationship and plan to leave together, but Martin is attacked by Felix and kills him; Debi stumbles upon the scene and flees the reunion in horror. She later confronts Martin in his hotel room, where he explains that psychological testing by the army indicated a "moral flexibility" in him that prompted the CIA to recruit him as an assassin, after which he decided to become a freelance hitman. He assures Debi that he accepts only contracts on corrupt individuals, but his efforts to justify his work disgust her and she rejects his attempts at reconciliation.

Martin retires from contract killing, provides Marcella with a large severance package, fires his therapist and finally opens the dossier detailing the contract that brought him to Grosse Pointe; he discovers the target is Debi's father Bart, who is scheduled to testify against Martin's client. Grocer decides to kill Bart himself to impress Martin's client and eliminate Martin as a competitor. Martin abandons the contract and saves Bart, taking him home; Grocer, his cohorts and the NSA agents descend upon the house. During the siege, Martin tells Debi that he left her on prom night to protect her from his homicidal urges, but that he has fallen in love with her again and developed a different outlook on life. He kills Grocer's henchmen before he and Grocer both kill the NSA agents. Martin admits he is out of ammunition, and Grocer offers to sell him a gun in an attempt to lure him into the open. Martin grabs the television set and slams it over Grocer’s head, killing him.

Tired and injured, Martin proposes marriage to Debi, who is too stunned by the killing spree to respond, though Bart gives him his blessing. Martin and Debi later leave Grosse Pointe together, with Debi confessing on her pre-recorded final radio show that she has decided to give love another chance.

== Cast ==
- John Cusack as Martin Q. Blank
- Minnie Driver as Debi Newberry
- Alan Arkin as Dr. Oatman
- Dan Aykroyd as Grocer
- Joan Cusack as Marcella
- Jeremy Piven as Paul Spericki
- Hank Azaria as Lardner
- Barbara Harris as Mary Blank
- Mitchell Ryan as Bart Newberry
- K. Todd Freeman as McCullers
- Michael Cudlitz as Bob Destepello

In addition, Benny Urquidez portrays Basque assassin Felix, while Cusack siblings Ann and Bill have brief appearances as Amy and a waiter, respectively.

== Production ==
The final draft of Grosse Pointe Blank was written by Tom Jankiewicz, Steve Pink, D. V. DeVincentis and John Cusack. Jankiewicz wrote the initial script in 1991 after receiving an invitation to his 10-year high school reunion. He picked the title while substitute teaching for an English class at Upland High School, writing the title on the classroom's whiteboard to see how it would look on a cinema marquee. He decided to set the film in Grosse Pointe, Michigan, rather than his working-class hometown of Sterling Heights, Michigan, due to the contrast between the two towns. He also factored in the wordplay of "point-blank range".

Jankiewicz simultaneously worked as a substitute teacher and a cashier at a Big Lots in Upland, California, to make ends meet before his script was picked up for production. Raised in Sterling Heights, he based several of the film's characters on his real friends from Bishop Foley Catholic High School in Madison Heights, Michigan. For example, Paul Spericki was originally named after his best friend during high school, although the name was changed during filming. An urban legend sprouted from the movie, that the film's script was based on a true story about a student who became a professional hitman. Marcella was named for Jankiewicz's manager at Big Lots.

Director George Armitage later said that he "did as much as anyone did in terms of writing" the film but did not seek credit. He added, "The script, when I met with John [Cusack] and the writers, was 132 pages. I said, 'Look, I'm not doing anything over 100 pages.' They said, 'Okay.' [...] They did a rewrite, and it came back 150 pages. So I said, 'Okay, you guys are fired.' I spent most of preproduction rewriting the screenplay, getting it down to 102 pages. Then we would improvise, and I noticed that some of the stuff I'd cut out was in the improvs—they were bringing back stuff that I'd cut out—but we had a good time with it."

The majority of the film was shot in Monrovia, California. Only the aerial footage of Lakeshore Road was actually shot in Grosse Pointe. The city did not allow the filmmakers to use any shots of Grosse Pointe South High School for the movie due to the presence of alcohol in the reunion scenes. In a 1997 interview, Cusack said he would have liked to film on location in Grosse Pointe, but they were unable to move production to Michigan due to budget constraints. The scene where Martin is attacked by Felix while exploring the halls of his old high school was filmed at Reseda High School.

Armitage later recalled, "With Grosse Pointe Blank I shot three movies simultaneously. We shot the script as written, we shot a mildly understated version, and we shot a completely over-the-top version, which usually was what was used. We cast that movie—and I've cast most movies—by having the actors come in and read, then throwing the script out and saying, 'Okay, let's improvise.' That's what I was comfortable with. I say to the actors, 'You are creating the character. This is written, these are the parameters, this is the outline. Now you take this, make it your own, and bring me, bring me, bring me.' [...] I'm very fond of Grosse Pointe Blank because of that; the insanity of it was trying to keep things working with three different registers to choose from."

Armitage said of the ending, "I'm usually rather rough on studio heads in terms of creative help, but after seeing the audience so angry at Alec Baldwin dying in Miami Blues, I decided that on Grosse Pointe Blank, this time, dealing with another psychopath, another sociopath, John's character—I just wanted him to survive, and we shot so many different endings. They were so generous at Disney, we had Michael Ovitz and Joe Roth running the place, they were really great with us. We shot two or three different endings, the two of them getting together, talking about things, and everything didn't work. And Joe Roth said at one of the screenings, 'When the father says 'you've got my blessing' in the bathtub at the end, after the shoot-out, just cut to the two of them leaving.' I thought, 'Let's give it a shot.' And it worked beautifully."

== Reception ==
=== Box office ===
The film opened at number four with an estimated $6.9 million and went on to gross $28.1 million domestically ($31.1 million worldwide) against a production budget reported at $15 million. In the United States, it was released the same month as Romy and Michele's High School Reunion, another 1980s-themed high school reunion film that Disney was involved with.

=== Critical response ===
Grosse Pointe Blank received positive reviews from critics. Review aggregation website Rotten Tomatoes gave the film a rating of 82%, based on 73 reviews. The website's critical consensus reads: "A high-concept high school reunion movie with an adroitly cast John Cusack and armed with a script of incisive wit." Metacritic gave the film a score of 76 out of 100, based on reviews from 27 critics, indicating "generally favorable" reviews. Audiences polled by CinemaScore gave the film an average grade of "B" on an A+ to F scale.

Peter Travers of Rolling Stone magazine wrote a positive review. Travers praised the writing as "smart, not smartass", praised director George Armitage for smashing action scenes that reveal character, praised Aykroyd and the talented cast in smaller supporting roles, and ultimately said the film "flies on Cusack’s seductive malevolence," and called him a marvel. Roger Ebert gave the film 2.5 stars out of 4. He praised the chemistry between the lead actors and enjoyed the dialogue, but considered it a "near-miss", wishing for a wittier, more articulate ending rather than an action sequence.

In 2026 The Guardian rated it as Cusack's third best film behind Being John Malkovich.

== Soundtrack ==
Grosse Pointe Blank

Soundtrack album by various artists
- Released: March 13, 1997 (Volume 1); October 7, 1997 (Volume 2)
- Genres: Rock, new wave, punk rock, post-punk, ska
- Length: 46:13 (Volume 1); 50:18 (Volume 2)
- Label: PolyGram

Professional ratings
Review scores
Source	Rating
Allmusic	Vol. 1 Vol. 2

The score for Grosse Pointe Blank was composed by Joe Strummer, formerly of the Clash, and the soundtrack includes two songs by the Clash: "Rudie Can't Fail" and their cover version of Willi Williams' "Armagideon Time".

In addition to the Clash, the tracks featured in the film are largely a mix of popular and alternative 1980s punk rock, ska, and new wave from such bands as Violent Femmes, Echo & the Bunnymen, the Specials, the Jam, Siouxsie and the Banshees, and A-ha. While most songs played throughout the film (especially at the reunion) had been recorded by the time of Martin Blank's high school graduation in 1986, several songs were recorded later. Joe Strummer's scoring captured music released before Martin's graduation as well as newer songs that were thematically in line with the '80s music, but which were released in time for the 10-year reunion in 1996. The post-graduation/pre-reunion songs include:

- The Guns N' Roses version of Paul McCartney's "Live and Let Die", heard in the scene where Martin first visits the Ultimart, was released in 1991.
- Los Fabulosos Cadillacs' "Matador", heard during the dance scene at the reunion, was released in 1993.
- The Specials' version of "Pressure Drop", played by Debi at the radio station during her "'80s weekend", was released in 1996.
- Eels' "Your Lucky Day in Hell", heard when Martin and Debi visit the Hippo Club for drinks, was also released in 1996.

The soundtrack album reached number 31 on the Billboard 200 chart, prompting the release of a second volume of songs from the film.

=== Grosse Pointe Blank – Music from the Film ===
1. "Blister in the Sun" - Violent Femmes (2:08)
2. "Rudie Can't Fail" - The Clash (3:31)
3. "Mirror in the Bathroom" - English Beat (3:09)
4. "Under Pressure" - David Bowie and Queen (4:03)
5. "I Can See Clearly Now" - Johnny Nash (2:46)
6. "Live and Let Die" - Guns N' Roses (3:02)
7. "We Care a Lot" - Faith No More (4:03)
8. "Pressure Drop" - The Specials (4:18)
9. "Absolute Beginners" - The Jam (2:50)
10. "Armagideon Time" - The Clash (3:53)
11. "Matador" - Los Fabulosos Cadillacs (4:34)
12. "Let My Love Open the Door (E. Cola Mix)" - Pete Townshend (4:58)
13. "Blister 2000" - Violent Femmes (2:58)
- This version of "Blister in the Sun" is a new recording that mirrors the original 1983 arrangement. It does not appear in the film.
- "Blister 2000" is a newly recorded, drastically rearranged version of "Blister in the Sun", which also does not appear in the film.

=== Grosse Pointe Blank – More Music from the Film ===
1. "A Message to You, Rudy" - The Specials (2:53)
2. "Cities in Dust" - Siouxsie and the Banshees (3:49)
3. "The Killing Moon" - Echo & the Bunnymen (5:44)
4. "Monkey Gone to Heaven" - Pixies (2:56)
5. "Lorca's Novena" - The Pogues (4:35)
6. "Go!" - Tones on Tail (2:32)
7. "Let It Whip" - Dazz Band (4:24)
8. "The Dominatrix Sleeps Tonight" - Dominatrix (3:40)
9. "War Cry" - Joe Strummer (5:58)
10. "White Lines (Don't Don't Do It)" - Melle Mel (7:24)
11. "Take On Me" - A-ha (3:46)
12. "You're Wondering Now" - The Specials (2:37)
- "Go!" is the short version, originally issued as the B-side of "Lions".
- "Let It Whip" is the LP version from Keep It Live.

=== Soundtrack omissions ===
Many songs from the film do not appear on the soundtracks.

Songs that appear in the film (in order of film appearance):

1. "Blister in the Sun" (LP Version) - Violent Femmes
2. Johannes Brahms' "Fugue in A-Minor" - Jacques van Oortmerseen
3. "Live and Let Die" (Muzak Version) - Adam Fields
4. "Ace of Spades" - Motörhead
5. "In Between Days" - The Cure
6. "Your Lucky Day in Hell" - Eels
7. "Sharks Can't Sleep" - Tracy Bonham
8. "Little Luxuries" - The Burros
9. "Big Boss Man" - Jimmy Reed
10. "Detroit City" - Bobby Bare
11. "Walk Like an Egyptian" - The Bangles
12. "99 Luftballons" - Nena
13. "Doors of Your Heart" - The English Beat

Songs in the trailer but not in the film:

1. "I Got You Babe" - UB40 and Chrissie Hynde
2. "Friend or Foe" - Adam Ant
3. "Modern Love" - David Bowie

== Home media ==
The film was released on VHS and DVD in 1998 in the United States, the United Kingdom, France, Australia and New Zealand.

== Unofficial sequel ==
According to Joan Cusack, the 2008 film War, Inc. is an informal sequel. Both films are similar in style and theme, and both star John as an assassin and his sister Joan as his assistant, with Dan Aykroyd in a supporting role.
