= Senator Farr =

Senator Farr may refer to:

- Asahel Farr (1820–1887), Wisconsin State Senate
- Fred Farr (1910–1997), California State Senate
- George A. Farr (1842–1914), Michigan State Senate
