= Michigan's 66th House of Representatives district =

American legislative district

Michigan's 66th State House of Representatives district
Representative
Josh Schriver; R–Oxford
- Demographics: 88.4% White; 1.5% Black; 4.5% Hispanic; 1.7% Asian; 0.1% Native American; 0.3% Other; 3.5% Multiracial
- Population (2024): 94,371

Michigan's 66th House of Representatives district (also referred to as Michigan's 66th House district) is a legislative district within the Michigan House of Representatives located in parts of Macomb and Oakland counties. The district was created in 1965, when the Michigan House of Representatives district naming scheme changed from a county-based system to a numerical one.

== List of representatives ==
Representative	Party	Dates	Residence	Notes
Bill Huffman	Democratic	1965–1974	Madison Heights	
Monte Geralds	Democratic	1975–1978	Madison Heights	Expelled from seat due to embezzlement.
Gary Vanek	Democratic	1978–1982	Royal Oak	
Wilfred D. Webb	Democratic	1983–1984	Hazel Park	
Gregory G. Gruse	Republican	1985–1986	Madison Heights	
Wilfred D. Webb	Democratic	1987–1992	Hazel Park	
Susan Grimes Munsell	Republican	1993–1996	Howell	
Judith L. Scranton	Republican	1997–2002	Brighton	
Christopher Ward	Republican	2003–2008	Brighton	
Bill Rogers	Republican	2009–2012	Brighton	
Aric Nesbitt	Republican	2013–2016	Lawton	
Beth Griffin	Republican	2017–2022	Mattawan	
Josh Schriver	Republican	2023–present	Oxford	

== Recent elections ==
=== 2020s ===
2026 Michigan House of Representatives election
Party	Candidate	Votes	%
Republican	Josh Schriver (incumbent)	32,010	62.89
Democratic	Ned Zimmer	18,886	37.11
Total votes		50,896	100
Republican hold			

2024 Michigan House of Representatives election
Party	Candidate	Votes	%
Republican	Josh Schriver	39,990	68.0
Democratic	Shawn Almeranti-Crosby	18,781	32.0
Total votes		58,771	100
Republican hold			

2022 Michigan House of Representatives election
Party	Candidate	Votes	%
Republican	Josh Schriver	30,841	64.6
Democratic	Emily Busch	16,865	35.4
Total votes		47,706	100
Republican hold			

2020 Michigan House of Representatives election
Party	Candidate	Votes	%
Republican	Beth Griffin	28,270	59.3
Democratic	Abigail Wheeler	19,403	40.7
Total votes		47,673	100
Republican hold			

2018 Michigan House of Representatives election
Party	Candidate	Votes	%
Republican	Beth Griffin	20,577	56.8
Democratic	Dan Seibert	15,637	43.2
Total votes		36,214	100
Republican hold			

2016 Michigan House of Representatives election
Party	Candidate	Votes	%
Republican	Beth Griffin	22,024	54.3
Democratic	Annie Brown	18,568	45.7
Total votes		40,592	100
Republican hold			

2014 Michigan House of Representatives election
Party	Candidate	Votes	%
Republican	Aric Nesbitt	15,753	57.5
Democratic	Annie Brown	11,646	42.5
Total votes		27,399	100
Republican hold			

2012 Michigan House of Representatives election
Party	Candidate	Votes	%
Republican	Aric Nesbitt	22,997	58.6
Democratic	Richard Rajkovich	16,276	41.4
Total votes		39,273	100
Republican hold			

2010 Michigan House of Representatives election
Party	Candidate	Votes	%
Republican	Bill Rogers	26,990	73.9
Democratic	James Delcamp	9,512	26.1
Total votes		36,502	100
Republican hold			

2008 Michigan House of Representatives election
Party	Candidate	Votes	%
Republican	Bill Rogers	32,128	60.3
Democratic	Donna Anderson	19,145	35.9
Libertarian	Todd Richardson	2,020	3.8
Total votes		53,293	100
Republican hold			

== Historical district boundaries ==
Map	Description	Apportionment Plan	Notes
	Oakland County (part): Clawson; Hazel Park (part); Madison Heights; Troy (part)	1964 Apportionment Plan	
	Oakland County (part): Madison Heights; Royal Oak (part)	1972 Apportionment Plan	
	Oakland County (part): Hazel Park; Madison Heights; Troy (part)	1982 Apportionment Plan	
	Livingston County (part): Brighton; Brighton Township; Genoa Township; Green Oak Township; Hamburg Township; Hartland Township; Howell; Marion Township (part); Oceola Township	1992 Apportionment Plan	
	Livingston County (part): Brighton; Brighton Township; Genoa Township; Green Oak Township; Marion Township (part); Oceola Township; Oakland County (part): Milford Township	2001 Apportionment Plan	
	Kalamazoo County (part): Alamo Township; Cooper Township; Parchment; Van Buren County	2011 Apportionment Plan	
