= Senator Huffman (disambiguation) =

James W. Huffman (1894–1980) was a U.S. Senator from Ohio from 1945 until 1946. Senator Huffman may also refer to:

- Bill Huffman (1924–2019), Michigan State Senate
- Charles Solomon Huffman (1865–1960), Kansas State Senate
- Joan Huffman (born 1956), Texas State Senate
- Matt Huffman (born 1960), Ohio State Senate
- Steve Huffman (Ohio politician) (born 1964), Ohio State Senate
