= Mark Campbell (tight end) =

American football player (born 1976)

No. 83, 84, 80
- Position: Tight end

Personal information
- Born: December 6, 1976 (age 49); Clawson, Michigan, U.S.
- Listed height: 6 ft 6 in (1.98 m)
- Listed weight: 260 lb (118 kg)

Career information
- High school: Bishop Foley Catholic (Madison Heights, Michigan)
- College: Michigan (1994–1998)
- NFL draft: 1999: undrafted

Career history
- Cleveland Browns (1999–2002); Buffalo Bills (2003–2005); New Orleans Saints (2006–2008)

Awards and highlights
- National champion (1997)

Career NFL statistics
- Receptions: 146
- Receiving yards: 1,356
- Receiving touchdowns: 12
- Stats at Pro Football Reference

Mark Joseph Campbell (December 6, 1975) is an American former professional football player who was a tight end for 10 seasons in the National Football League (NFL) with the Cleveland Browns from 1999 to 2002, the Buffalo Bills from 2003 to 2005, and the New Orleans Saints from 2006 to 2008. He played college football for the Michigan Wolverines from 1995 to 1998.

== Early life ==
Campbell was born in Clawson, Michigan, in 1975. He is the youngest of 5 children of John and Elizabeth Campbell. His siblings are John (brother), Kevin (brother), Diann (sister), and Doug (brother). He grew up in Clawson and attended Bishop Foley Catholic High School in Madison Heights, Michigan. He was an All-State selection as a High School Senior in football, basketball, and baseball. Additionally, Campbell was 1 of 2 Tight Ends (Future Hall of Fame member Tony Gonzalez as the other) to be selected as a Football Parade All-American. He accepted a football scholarship to attend the University of Michigan. In later years, Campbell was selected in the Catholic League Hall of Fame.

== University of Michigan ==
Campbell enrolled at the University of Michigan in 1994 with Gary Moeller as head coach. He played college football on head coach Lloyd Carr's Michigan Wolverines football teams from 1995 to 1998. Campbell began his collegiate career playing multiple offensive positions but primarily as a tight end. He started his first game as a fullback in 1995 and started 5 games as the second tight end in 1996. In 1997, he started one game each at fullback and tight end. Campbell separated himself from competitors with his blocking efficiency. He was rated as the #2 ranked blocking tight end in all of college football by USA Today. Campbell started and caught the first pass of the Rose Bowl leading the charge to victory. He was 1 of 32 players on the team to eventually play in the National Football League. Campbell was a key member and team leader of the 1997 National Championship team. As a senior in 1998, he started 7 games at tight end or as the second tight end on the field. In four years at Michigan, Campbell caught 32 passes for 357 yards and one touchdown. Again, he played a key member in team leadership and was presented as the Bob Ufer award winner as voted on by his teammates. This award signifies his appreciation by his peers as a low profile but essential part of the team's success.

== Professional football ==
Campbell was undrafted in the 1999 NFL draft. He signed as a free agent with the Cleveland Browns and played for them from 1999 to 2002 under Executive Vice President/Director of Football Operations Dwight Clark and head coach Chris Palmer. Ray Perkins served as his tight ends coach. Campbell missed most of the 2001 season with a broken leg suffered in the last week of training camp and placed on Injured Reserve. He was extremely motivated to keep improving so he took his recovery time to lift weights, train, and build his physique while gaining twenty pounds of muscle while keeping his playing weight the same. In 2002, Campbell came back ready to play and was named the opening day starter at tight end. The Browns released the previous starter and former first round pick, Rickey Dudley, to make room for Campbell. He had a solid season and was awarded the Ed Block Courage Award Winner. He appeared in 46 games for the Browns, 30 as the team's starting tight end, and caught 46 passes for 390 yards and four touchdowns. Additionally, he was named on the team's leadership council selected by head coach Butch Davis.

In February 2003, the Browns traded Campbell to the Buffalo Bills in exchange for a conditional pick in the 2004 NFL draft. The conditional pick, based on Campbell's play in 2003, eventually was determined a fourth round selection. After playing well both as a blocker and receiver in the first eight games of the 2003 Buffalo Bills season, Campbell was signed to a multi-year contract extension by General Manager Tom Donahoe and head coach Gregg Williams. In 2004, under new head coach, Mike Mularkey, Campbell was elected on the team's leadership council. Also, he was the only tight end in Buffalo Bills team history to score three touchdowns in a single game. He is tied for the most receiving touchdowns in a single game for all receivers with three. Both records he still holds today. He suffered a season ending knee ACL injury in 2004 in the ninth game of the year. He was on pace to break personal records for receptions and touchdowns before the injury. Additionally, he was nominated as the NFL Players Association representative as voted on by his teammates. An honor that Campbell held for six of his ten years in the NFL. In 2005, he returned from injury to start the first game of the season. He played another solid season in Buffalo highlighted with his second career Ed Block Courage Award. He is the only player to win the Ed Block Courage Award twice in a career. Campbell was with the Bills from 2003 to 2005. He appeared in 42 games for the Bills, 33 as a starting tight end, and caught 70 passes for 681 yards and six touchdowns.

Campbell concluded his NFL career playing for the New Orleans Saints from 2006 to 2008. He appeared in 23 games, 14 as a starter at tight end, for the Saints and caught 30 passes for 285 yards and two touchdowns. In 2006, he was awarded as the tight end on the All-Joe Team by USA Today. This team is composed of low profile players that quietly excel. It is voted on by all of the general managers of NFL teams. In 2007, Campbell injured his back in the last pre-season game versus the Kansas City Chiefs. He was placed on Injured Reserve for the entire season. In 2008, Campbell returned to the field and filled a variety of offensive roles. He retired after suffering a knee injury late in the 2008 season, and having undergone ten surgeries in 10 years to repair a variety of football injuries. He turned down an offer to play for the 2009 Saints team that won Super Bowl XLIV. He was considered an extra quarterback on the field due to his preparation and football IQ. Campbell was offered multiple NFL and Division I coaching positions but ultimately, he wanted to move back to Michigan to raise his young family rather than potentially move around the country to coach.

In ten NFL seasons, Campbell appeared in 111 games, 77 as a starter, and caught 146 yards for 1,356 yards. Sports Illustrated in 2010 called him "one of those blue collar guys who carves out a solid career in the NFL ... without ever receiving much in the way of accolades or time in the spotlight. He could make his teams look great without the average fan knowing it. Campbell is one of the leadership guys you want in your locker room or on your side when things weren't going well. He'll help guide the ship out of it."

== Later life ==
After retiring from football, Campbell accepted a job in healthcare and as a broadcaster covering games for the Big Ten Network. He founded a medical company, Medkinect, in 2010. He also invested in a high complexity toxicology laboratory. He is a board member of the ChadTough Foundation, meant to inspire and fund research to discover effective treatments for pediatric brain cancer, with an emphasis on Diffuse Intrinsic Pontine Glioma (DIPG).
