= Gary Vanek =

American politician

Member of the Michigan House of Representatives from the 66th district
- In office July 12, 1978 – 1982
- Preceded by: Monte Geralds
- Succeeded by: Wilfred D. Webb

Personal details
- Born: August 12, 1940
- Died: September 5, 2017 (aged 77)
- Party: Democratic
- Education: Central Michigan University; Eastern Michigan University

Gary M. Vanek (August 12, 1940 – September 5, 2017) was a Michigan politician.

== Early life ==
Vanek was born on August 12, 1940.

== Education ==
Vanek graduated from Central Michigan University and Eastern Michigan University.

== Career ==
Vanek served on the Michigan Liquor Control Commission. On July 11, 1978, Vanek was elected to the Michigan House of Representatives where he represented the 66th district from July 12, 1978 to 1982.

== Death ==
Vanek died on September 5, 2017.
