= George W. Kuhn Retention and Treatment Basin =

Stormwater management facility in Michigan, USA

Coordinates: 42.5077°N 83.1118°W

The George W. Kuhn Retention and Treatment Basin is a stormwater management facility in Oakland County, Michigan. During heavy rains, it sanitizes and stores the combined sewer flow from 14 cities in southeast Oakland County. The disinfected mixture of rainwater and sewage can then flow to the Detroit Wastewater Treatment Plant or Lake St. Clair.

== History ==
In 1958, the Associated Press reported that, according to the state Health Department, in southeast Oakland County, "black septic sewage boils up out of the catch basin and manhole openings after a heavy rain, threatening disease outbreaks." The state health commissioner said that year that he was concerned about the health consequences of basement flooding, and that "lack of adequate facilities for sewage treatment results in frequent, almost daily, discharges of untreated sewage into the Red Run and then into the Clinton River... The situation is intolerable."

The initial phase of the project, the Twelve Towns Drain, was planned in the 1950s and constructed in 1962 and 1963. A groundbreaking ceremony for the $40 million project ($430 million in 2025 dollars) took place at the corner of Twelve Mile Road and Stephenson Highway on March 3, 1962.

In the 1970s and 1990s, storage capacity of the system was increased. But during the heaviest rain events, the system was inadequate at preventing raw sewage outflows to the Red Run. In 1994 and 1995, beaches on Lake St. Clair were closed due to bacteria. Facing $1 billion in potential pollution fines, Oakland County planned the $144 million ($268.8 in 2025 dollars) Kuhn Basin project, to be paid for by the fourteen communities served by the Twelve Towns Drain.

In October 2001, construction on the Kuhn Basin began. It was named after former Oakland County Drain Commissioner George W. Kuhn. The project was completed in 2005.

== Red Oaks County Park ==
After its original construction, discussion arose about how to use the narrow strip of county-owned land over the basin, which is over a mile long between John R Road and Dequindre Road. In 1974, Michigan Department of Natural Resources recommended the site be a local park.

The county hired architecture firm Bills/Childs Associates of Pontiac to design a 9-hole golf course for the site. A pedestrian path that crosses the site (which connects Hiller Elementary to a neighborhood to the south) would use a bridge so as not to disrupt play. Construction workers had to contend with overhead power lines, a trash incinerator nearby, and concrete and scrap metal that had been used as fill to cover the basin. 250,000 cubic yards of soil were trucked in to smooth and shape the course, and 500 trees were planted. The course opened around 1979. In 1987, a water park was added to the site. The 2001 reconstruction temporarily closed the golf course.

== Purpose and function ==
Control room

Tanks holding bleach and associated pumps are used to sanitize effluent

A row of mechanical screens rake out trash from the effluent upstream of the retention basin

The purpose of the facility is to eliminate basement and street flooding in Oakland County while eliminating raw sewage outflows to the Clinton River and downstream to Lake St. Clair.

Many communities in southeast Oakland County were developed with combined sewers that mix rainwater and sewage. During dry weather, wastewater flows through tunnels to the Detroit Wastewater Treatment Plant. During heavy rain events, wastewater flows over a weir in the wastewater tunnel and is diverted to the retention and treatment basin. First, machines screen out debris and bleach is added to disinfect the flow. It is then sent to an underground tank that can hold 150 million gallons of the combined sewage and rainwater.

The basin is emptied with pumps and the flow is sent to the Detroit Wastewater Treatment Plant. However, when wastewater exceeds the basin's capacity, the disinfected wastewater is released into the Red Run Drain, a tributary of the Clinton River, at the Oakland-Macomb County border.

== Catastrophic rainfall events ==
The basin is infrequently overwhelmed by catastrophic rainfall events. For example, during the flood of August 2014, 2 billion gallons of wastewater flowed through the system into the Red Run and caused $3-5 million in damage to the Kuhn Basin infrastructure. During that storm, in Royal Oak alone, about forty percent of homes were damaged by basement flooding. Oakland County Drain Commissioner Jim Nash stated that even during that storm, all discharges to the Red Run are disinfected and meet the standards of their permit.

== Controversy ==
Officials with Macomb County, downstream of the Kuhn Basin, have complained about the outflow, stating that regulations for treated sewage are not stringent enough. In 2025, Macomb County Public Works Commissioner Candice Miller complained when a heavy rainfall event led to 1.2 million gallons of "untreated or partially treated sewage" flowing into the Red Run. Debris, including toilet wipes and tampons, was found at the outflow. The problem was traced to the nearby Dequindre Interceptor sewer, which, under certain weather conditions, could discharge untreated sewage into the same outflow area as the Kuhn basin. Adjustments were subsequently made to the sewer's control structures to help prevent these discharges. The Michigan Department of Environment, Great Lakes, and Energy has announced "escalated enforcement action" against Oakland County.

== List of Communities served ==
- Berkley
- Beverly Hills
- Birmingham
- Clawson
- Ferndale
- Hazel Park
- Huntington Woods
- Madison Heights
- Oak Park
- Pleasant Ridge
- Royal Oak
- Royal Oak Township
- Southfield
- Troy
