= Michigan's 26th Senate district =

American legislative district

Michigan's 26th State Senate district
Senator
Kevin Daley; R–Lum
- Demographics: 87.6% White; 3.2% Black; 4.6% Hispanic; 0.3% Asian; 0.2% Native American; 0.2% Other; 3.9% Multiracial
- Population (2024): 259,993

Michigan's 26th Senate district is one of 38 districts in the Michigan Senate. The 26th district was created by the 1850 Michigan Constitution, as the 1835 constitution only permitted a maximum of eight senate districts. It has been represented by Republican Kevin Daley since 2023, succeeding fellow Republican Aric Nesbitt.

== Geography ==
District 26 encompasses parts of Genesee, Lapeer, Saginaw, and Tuscola counties.

=== 2011 Apportionment Plan ===
District 26, as dictated by the 2011 Apportionment Plan, stretched along the Lake Michigan coast in Allegan and Van Buren Counties and parts of Kent County. Communities within the district included Kentwood, South Haven, Hartford, Paw Paw, Allegan, Otsego, Plainwell, Wayland, Antwerp Township, Gaines Township, and southern Holland.

The district was located largely within Michigan's 6th congressional district, also extending into the 2nd and 3rd districts. It overlapped with the 66th, 72nd, and 80th districts of the Michigan House of Representatives.

== List of senators ==
Senator	Party	Dates	Residence	Notes
Amos Gould	Democratic	1853–1854	Owosso	
Charles P. Bush	Democratic	1855–1856	Lansing	
Omar D. Conger	Republican	1857–1860	Port Huron	
Ezra Hazen	Republican	1861–1862	Dryden	
John Merritt Lamb Sr.	Republican	1863–1864	Memphis	
William R. Nims	Republican	1865–1866	Lexington	
David Jerome	Republican	1867–1868	Saginaw	
Alfred B. Wood	Republican	1869–1872	East Saginaw	
Ralph Ely	Republican	1873–1874	Alma	
Isaac A. Fancher	Republican	1875–1876	Mount Pleasant	
Charles D. Nelson	Republican	1877–1878	Muskegon	
George A. Farr	Republican	1879–1882	Grand Haven	
Shubael F. White	Republican	1883–1884	Ludington	
Edward E. Edwards	Republican	1885–1886	Fremont	
Andrew Harshaw	Democratic	1887–1890	Alpena	Elected on a fusion ticket in 1886, backed by both the Democrats and the Greenback Party.
Charles A. Fridlender	Democratic	1891–1892	Oscoda	
Enoch T. Mugford	Democratic	1893–1894	Hart	
A. Oren Wheeler	Republican	1895–1896	Manistee	
James K. Flood	Republican	1897–1900	Hart	
Augustine W. Farr	Republican	1901–1906	Onekama	
Earl Fairbanks	Republican	1907–1910	Luther	
Charles E. Cartier	Republican	1911–1912	Ludington	
Samuel Odell	Republican	1913–1916	Shelby	
Charles W. Tufts	Republican	1917–1922	Ludington	
Orville E. Atwood	Republican	1923–1926	Newaygo	
Thomas Read	Republican	1927–1928	Shelby	
Orville E. Atwood	Republican	1929–1930	Newaygo	
Frank A. Smith	Republican	1931–1932	Luther	
George Cutler	Democratic	1933–1934	Luther	
Don VanderWerp	Republican	1935–1956	Fremont	
Lloyd A. Stephens	Republican	1957–1964	Scottville	
John T. Bowman	Democratic	1965–1974	Roseville	
Joseph M. Snyder	Democratic	1975–1978	St. Clair Shores	
Gilbert DiNello	Democratic	1979–1992	East Detroit	
Gilbert DiNello	Republican	1992–1994	East Detroit	
Mike Rogers	Republican	1995–2000	Howell	Resigned after elected to the U.S. House of Representatives.
Valde Garcia	Republican	2001–2002	St. Johns	
Deborah Cherry	Democratic	2003–2010	Burton	
Tonya Schuitmaker	Republican	2011–2018	Lawton	
Aric Nesbitt	Republican	2019–2022	Lawton	
Kevin Daley	Republican	2023–present	Lum	

== Recent election results ==
=== 2020s ===
2026 Michigan Senate election
Primary election
Party	Candidate	Votes	%
General election
Republican	Matthew Bierlein	74,620	60.62
Democratic	Brendan J. Johnson	48,478	39.38
Total votes		123,098	100
Republican hold			

2022 Michigan Senate election, District 26
Primary election
Party	Candidate	Votes	%
Republican	Kevin Daley (incumbent)	27,630	75.9
Republican	Sherry J. Marden	8,796	24.1
Total votes		36,426	100
General election
Republican	Kevin Daley (incumbent)	74,158	62.5
Democratic	Charles Stadler	44,599	37.5
Total votes		118,757	100
Republican hold			

=== 2018 ===
2018 Michigan Senate election, District 26
Primary election
Party	Candidate	Votes	%
Republican	Aric Nesbitt	16,529	51.1
Republican	Robert Genetski	9,377	29.0
Republican	Don Wickstra	6,443	19.9
Total votes		32,349	100
General election
Republican	Aric Nesbitt	61,509	56.7
Democratic	Garnet Lewis	43,495	40.1
Libertarian	Erwin Haas	2,375	2.2
Green	Robert Alway	1,153	1.1
Total votes		108,532	100
Republican hold			

=== 2014 ===
2014 Michigan Senate election, District 26
Party	Candidate	Votes	%
Republican	Tonya Schuitmaker (incumbent)	47,244	61.4
Democratic	Jim Walters	26,782	34.8
Libertarian	William Wenzel	2,944	3.8
Total votes		76,970	100
Republican hold			

=== Federal and statewide results ===
Year	Office	Results
2020	President	Trump 55.0 – 43.1%
2018	Senate	James 54.8 – 42.9%
2018	Governor	Schuette 52.5 – 44.2%
2016	President	Trump 55.3 – 38.6%
2014	Senate	Land 52.8 – 42.3%
2014	Governor	Snyder 62.2 – 35.2%
2012	President	Romney 54.8 – 44.1%
2012	Senate	Hoekstra 50.4 – 46.3%

== Historical district boundaries ==
Map	Description	Apportionment Plan	Notes
	Macomb County (part); Chesterfield Township; East Detroit; Fraser; Harrison Township; Lake Township; New Baltimore; Roseville; St. Clair Shores; St. Clair County (part); Casco Township; Ira Township; New Baltimore	1964 Apportionment Plan	
	Macomb County (part); Center Line; East Detroit; St. Clair Shores; Warren (part); Wayne County (part); Grosse Pointe Woods (part)	1972 Apportionment Plan	
	Macomb County (part); Clinton Township; East Detroit; Harrison Township; Lake Township; Mount Clemens; St. Clair Shores	1982 Apportionment Plan	
	Clinton County; Livingston County; Shiawassee County	1992 Apportionment Plan	
	Genesee County (part); Atlas Township; Burton; Clio; Davison; Davison Township; Forest Township; Grand Blanc; Grand Blanc Township; Mount Morris; Mount Morris Township; Richfield Township; Thetford Township; Vienna Township; Oakland County (part); Brandon Township; Groveland Township; Springfield Township; Waterford Township	2001 Apportionment Plan	
	Allegan County; Kent County (part); Gaines Township; Kentwood; Van Buren County	2011 Apportionment Plan	
