= Pat Jankiewicz =

American author, journalist, media historian, and actor

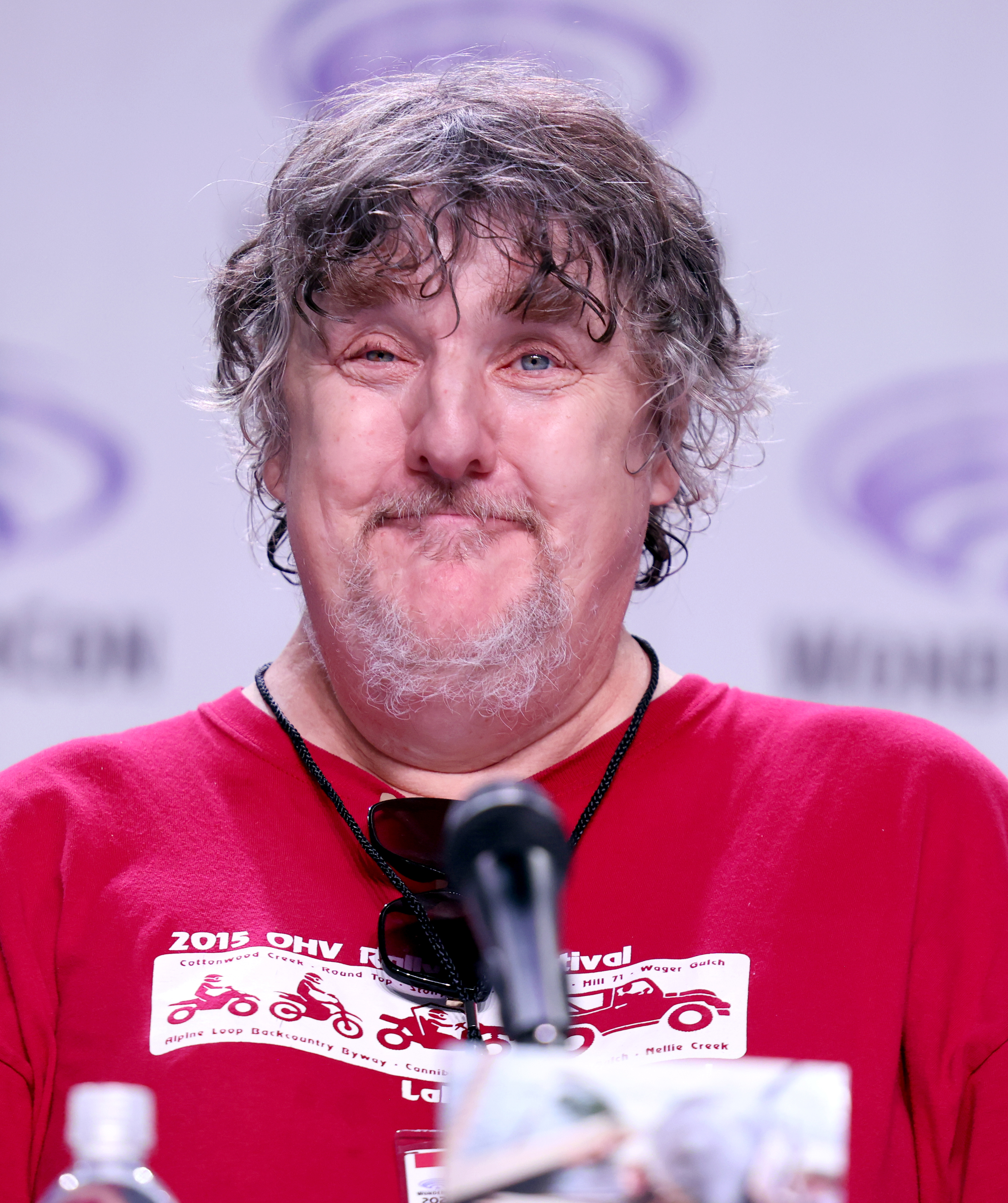
- Jankiewicz in 2026
- Occupations: Author; journalist; media historian; actor
- Family: Tom Jankiewicz (brother)

Patrick Jankiewicz, known more often as Pat Jankiewicz, is an American author, journalist, and media historian specializing in companion books for genre media, and an actor. He has been a long‑time contributor to magazines such as Fangoria, Starlog and Film Review; and he has played many acting roles in television and film, centered on creature work.

== Personal life ==
Jankiewicz was raised in Michigan. He has lived in Southern California, and honed his writing skills while working in public relations and copywriting. He is the younger brother of Grosse Pointe Blank screenwriter Tom Jankiewicz, and actor Donald R. Jankiewicz.

== Writing ==
Jankiewicz began writing for genre magazines in the late 1980s, including articles, interviews and features for Fangoria, Starlog and Film Review, as well as working for years with the SyFy Channel. This background informed his research. He contributed Star Trek profiles to Starlog in the early 1990s alongside writers such as Lee Goldberg and Craig Chrissinger.

In 2014 his Fangoria article "Killer Thriller", revisiting John Landis's Michael Jackson's Thriller music video, appeared on the ballot for the twelfth Rondo Hatton Classic Horror Awards.

=== Just When You Thought It Was Safe: A Jaws Companion ===
In 2010, Jankiewicz's first major work, the book Just When You Thought It Was Safe: A Jaws Companion (BearManor Media, 2010), examines the production of Steven Spielberg's Jaws and its sequels. Reviewer Robert Gold praised the book's extensive interviews.

=== You Wouldn't Like Me When I'm Angry: A Hulk Companion ===
His 2012 book You Wouldn't Like Me When I'm Angry: A Hulk Companion is a detailed guide to the 1978–82 television series The Incredible Hulk. The book surveys each episode and provides behind‑the‑scenes information about the production.

=== Buck Rogers in the 25th Century: A TV Companion ===
Buck Rogers in the 25th Century: A TV Companion in 2015 covers the TV series Buck Rogers in the 25th Century. In his review for Bookpleasures, media historian Dr. Wesley Britton wrote that the book offers the "first in‑depth exploration of Buck Rogers" and described Jankiewicz as a "media historian". The volume includes new interviews and an episode guide.

=== The Greatest American Hero Companion ===
Jankiewicz later wrote The Greatest American Hero Companion in 2021, a reference guide to the 1981–83 superhero comedy series The Greatest American Hero. Articles about the series have quoted his research; for example, a pop‑culture retrospective noted that Jankiewicz explained how the show was pitched as "The Rockford Files with a superhero". He also recorded audio commentaries for several episodes of the series, and in 2023 contributed commentary tracks for the Kino Lorber Blu‑ray release of Buck Rogers in the 25th Century, where he was credited as a film/TV historian and author of the companion book.

== Acting ==
In addition to his writing, Jankiewicz has appeared in small roles in films and television. He had bit parts in feature films including Beethoven's 2nd (1993), Fight Club (1999), K-PAX (2001) and The Rundown (2003), and he played various creatures in independent horror films, including The Prey: Legend of Karnoctus He has numerous uncredited appearances in episodes of many genre shows and Star Trek: Voyager as a Hanonian citizen and Klingon mourner, and he has lent his voice and likeness to several low‑budget productions.
