= Senator Fancher =

Senator Fancher may refer to:

- Albert T. Fancher (1859–1930), New York State Senate
- Isaac A. Fancher (1833–1934), Michigan State Senate
