= Wilfred D. Webb =

American educator and politician

Member of the Michigan House of Representatives from the 66th district
- In office January 1, 1987 – December 31, 1992
- Preceded by: Gregory Gruse
- Succeeded by: Susan Grimes Munsell
- In office June 1982 – December 31, 1984
- Preceded by: Gary Vanek
- Succeeded by: Gregory Gruse

Personal details
- Born: Wilfred Dwight Webb; March 23, 1921 Rathbone, Michigan
- Died: July 2, 2016 (aged 95) Hazel Park, Michigan
- Party: Democratic
- Spouse: Virginia
- Education: Wayne State University (M.A., Ed.D.); Alma College (B.A.)

Wilfred Dwight Webb (March 23, 1921 – July 2, 2016) was an educator and a Democratic politician from Michigan who served in the state's House of Representatives representing part of Oakland County.

Webb was hired as a teacher in the Hazel Park schools in 1941, ultimately becoming superintendent at age 36. Upon his retirement from the district, he worked as a K-12 education consultant with the Michigan Senate. He also was president of the Michigan Association of School Administrators, and was a member of several other organizations including Phi Delta Kappa. Webb was named to the Michigan Education Hall of Fame in 1985.

He was elected to the House in a special election in June 1982 and was re-elected for a full term that November. His one-term absence from the House was a result of the 1984 election in which Ronald Reagan won the state by 19 points. Webb was originally projected to win by just over 200 votes, but it was soon discovered that one precinct in Madison Heights had been counted twice. When the error was corrected, Webb lost to then-Wayne State University College Republicans chairman Gregory Gruse. The two faced each other again in 1986, and Webb won. While in the Legislature, Webb sponsored legislation to outlaw elder abuse. He declined to seek re-election in 1992.
