= Charles D. Nelson =

American politician (1824–1895)

Member of the Michigan Senate from the 26th district
- In office 1876–1878
- Preceded by: Isaac A. Fancher
- Succeeded by: George A. Farr

Member of the Michigan Senate from the 29th district
- In office 1874–1876
- Preceded by: Henry S. Clubb
- Succeeded by: Columbus V. Tyler

Personal details
- Born: May 12, 1824 Newbury, Vermont, U.S.
- Died: September 7, 1895 (aged 71) Muskegon, Michigan, U.S.
- Resting place: Mountain Home Cemetery; Kalamazoo, Michigan, U.S.
- Party: Republican
- Spouse: Caroline Wason (m. 1848; died 1884)
- Children: 3
- Occupation: Politician; bookkeeper; businessman

Charles D. Nelson (May 12, 1824 – September 7, 1895) was an American politician from Michigan. He served in the Michigan Senate.

== Early life ==
Charles D. Nelson was born on May 12, 1824, in Newbury, Vermont, to Rachel (née Gates) and Stephen P. Nelson. He attended common schools. At the age of 16, he took a course at the Newbury seminary. He then graduated from a commercial college in Boston in 1842.

== Career ==
Nelson worked as a bookkeeper at a commercial house in Boston. In 1844, he bought an interest in Richard Munn & Company, a granite business in Quincy. In 1854, he sold his interest. He then served as agent and foreman for the West District Granite Company over the next two years. In February 1857, he came to Muskegon, Michigan, as an agent for Marsh & Foss, Chicago lumberman. He took charge of the firm's mill near Lee's ferry dock in Muskegon. He worked for them for 11 years. He then purchased an interest from Phillips & Browne of Chicago in the Port Sherman mill at the mouth of Muskegon Lake. The firm then became Browne, Nelson & Company. The property also included 75,000,000 feet of standing pine on the Muskegon River. The firm continue for seven years and he sold his interest to R. A. Loveland in 1874. In 1876, he supervised the rebuilding of the mill. He was a member of the firm George D. Herrick & Company, dealers of musical merchandise of Grand Rapids.

Nelson was a Republican. In 1859, he was elected register of deeds for Muskegon County and served in that role for two years. He was supervisor of the village of Muskegon from 1862 to 1867. He served as alderman from 1878 to 1882. He was elected treasurer of Muskegon and served one year. In 1874, Nelson was elected to represent 29th district of the Michigan Senate. He was elected to represent the 26th district of the senate in 1876 and served as president pro tempore. He was chairman of the committee on penal institutions. During his tenure, they oversaw the investigation of the conditions of affairs at the state's prison in Jackson. It ultimately led to the dismissal of the warden and the committee recommending a more humane system for prisoners in a bill introduced by Nelson. The bill became law. He was a member of the board of education and served as its president. He resigned the role and moved to Kalamazoo.

== Personal life ==
Nelson married Caroline "Carrie" Wason, daughter of Thomas Wason, on May 20, 1848. They had three children, Herbert, Jennie, and Harley W. His wife died in 1884. The family moved to Kalamazoo. Following his wife's death, the family moved back to Muskegon.

In later life, Nelson lived at the home of Francis Gerrish in Muskegon. He died at their house on September 7, 1895. He was buried at Mountain Home Cemetery in Kalamazoo.

== Legacy ==
The Nelson School Building was named after him. He dedicated a Nelson piano to the building.
