= Josh Schriver =

American politician (born 1992)

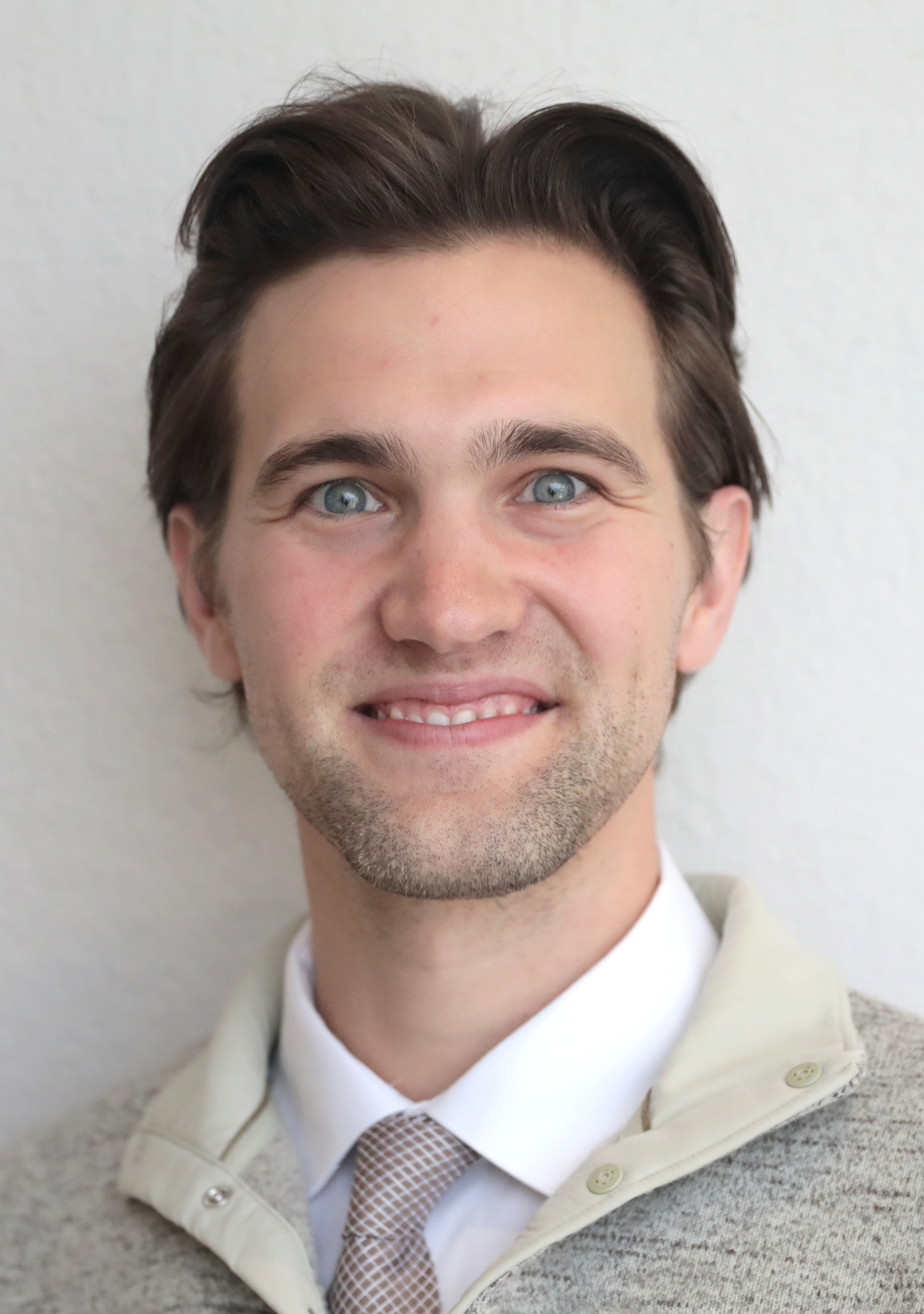
- Schriver in 2022

Member of the Michigan House of Representatives from the 66th district
- Incumbent
- Assumed office January 1, 2023
- Preceded by: Beth Griffin (redistricting)

Personal details
- Born: March 14, 1992 (age 34)
- Party: Republican
- Education: Michigan State University (BA)

Joshua Schriver (born March 14, 1992) is an American politician serving as a member of the Michigan House of Representatives since 2023, representing the 66th district. He is a member of the Republican Party.

During his tenure in the Michigan legislature, he has called for a ban on hormonal birth control, pornography, same-sex marriage and gender-affirming care for adults, as well as promoted the Great Replacement conspiracy theory.

== Early life and education ==
Schriver born on March 14, 1992, and was raised in Warren, Michigan, and graduated from De La Salle Collegiate High School. He holds a bachelor's degree in arts and humanities from Michigan State University (MSU), from which he graduated in 2016. He has a master's degree in psychology from online school Capella University. The 2023–24 Michigan Manual states that he is an autism clinician and a board-certified behavior analyst. His behavior analyst license from the Michigan Department of Licensing and Regulatory Affairs expired in November 2023.

== Early career ==
According to his legislative campaign website, Schriver was a poll worker and precinct delegate in 2018 and a field organizer for Donald Trump's 2020 presidential campaign.

In 2020, when Schriver lived in South Lyon, Michigan, he unsuccessfully ran for a seat on the Oakland County Board of Commissioners. He received 30% in the Republican primary election, losing to incumbent Phil Weipert.

== Political career ==
He subsequently moved to Oxford, Michigan, where he was elected to the Michigan House of Representatives from the 66th district in the 2022 election. The seat was open because the incumbent representative, Republican John Reilly, was term-limited. In the five-candidate Republican primary, Schriver won with 38% of the vote, and won the November 2022 general election by a broad margin, defeating Democratic nominee Emily Busch. In the August 2024 Republican primary, Schriver was challenged by former Royal Oak councilman Randy LeVasseur. Schriver won renomination with about 66% of the vote, and went on to be reelected November 2024 general election. Schriver's exurban district is a Republican safe seat. It covers portions of Oakland and Macomb counties, specifically Brandon, Oxford, Addison, and Oakland townships in northern Oakland County, and Bruce and Washington townships in Macomb County. He was president of his neighborhood's homeowners association.

Although once obscure, Schriver rose to prominence among the far-right soon after joining the state House. In speeches, interviews and podcast appearances, and social media posts, he espoused Christian nationalist views. In a December 2023 talk radio interview on WCHY-FM, he said, "At the end of the day, it's God who appoints our elective officials. Honestly, I work for God and not for man. And so I answer to one person, and that's Jesus Christ." In an appearance on Jack Posobiec's podcast, he said that "No one is ever going to run to the right of me" and said he was called to his legislative seat by God.

In 2023, when the state House voted 105–4 to recognize Juneteenth as a state holiday, Schriver was one of the four members to vote no (joining fellow Republicans Steve Carra, Neil Friske, and Matthew Maddock). He also voted against a bill to ban child marriage along with Carra, Friske, Maddock, and Angela Rigas. Later that year, when the House passed a package of sex abuse bills in the wake of the Larry Nassar and Robert Anderson scandals on a 105–4 vote, Schriver was again one of the four no votes, alongside Carra, Friske, and Maddock.

In 2023, after the Michigan participants in the 2020 Trump fake electors plot were charged with forgery, Schriver lauded the defendants as "America's patriots" and called state Attorney General Dana Nessel a "thug."

In January 2024, in a conversation about transgender healthcare with several Republican legislators, Schriver asked, "If we are going to stop this for anyone under 18, why not apply it for anyone over 18? It's harmful across the board and that's something we need to take into consideration in terms of the endgame." Two other Republican officials, Michigan State Rep. Brad Paquette and Ohio State Rep. Gary Click, expressed agreement.

In February 2024, Schriver called for a birth control ban, saying, "If doctors are sworn to do no harm, then lawmakers should look into banning hormonal birth control." His proposal was criticized by advocates for reproductive rights.

In February 2024, Schriver retweeted a post by Posobiec promoting the white nationalist Great Replacement conspiracy theory. Several Democratic lawmakers condemned Schriver's post, including Michigan House Speaker Joe Tate who described it as "blatantly racist" and "deeply and personally" offensive. Michigan House Minority Leader Matt Hall did not respond to requests for comment. A few days after the post, Tate removed Schriver from his committee assignments and removed his office staff.

In December 2024, Schriver posted a tweet calling for same-sex marriage to be banned, writing, "Make gay marriage illegal again. This is not remotely controversial, nor extreme." In February 2025, Schriver introduced a resolution, co-sponsored by six other Republicans, calling for the Supreme Court to overturn Obergefell v. Hodges; the resolution did not advance in the chamber.

In March 2025, Schriver announced plans to introduce legislation banning internet pornography for all state residents regardless of age. Schriver has stated that he believes pornography "harms all who come into contact with it" and has publicly compared its use to that of heroin. In September 2025, he introduced the Anticorruption of Public Morals Act, would proposed banning pornography, VPN services, and depictions of transgender people online.

In October 2025, Schriver's personal information was reportedly found in a data breach from defunct porn and hookup site Fling.com. Schriver has denied the claims.

== See also ==
- Official website at the Michigan House of Representatives
- Page at Michigan House Republicans
