= Aric Nesbitt =

American politician (born 1980)

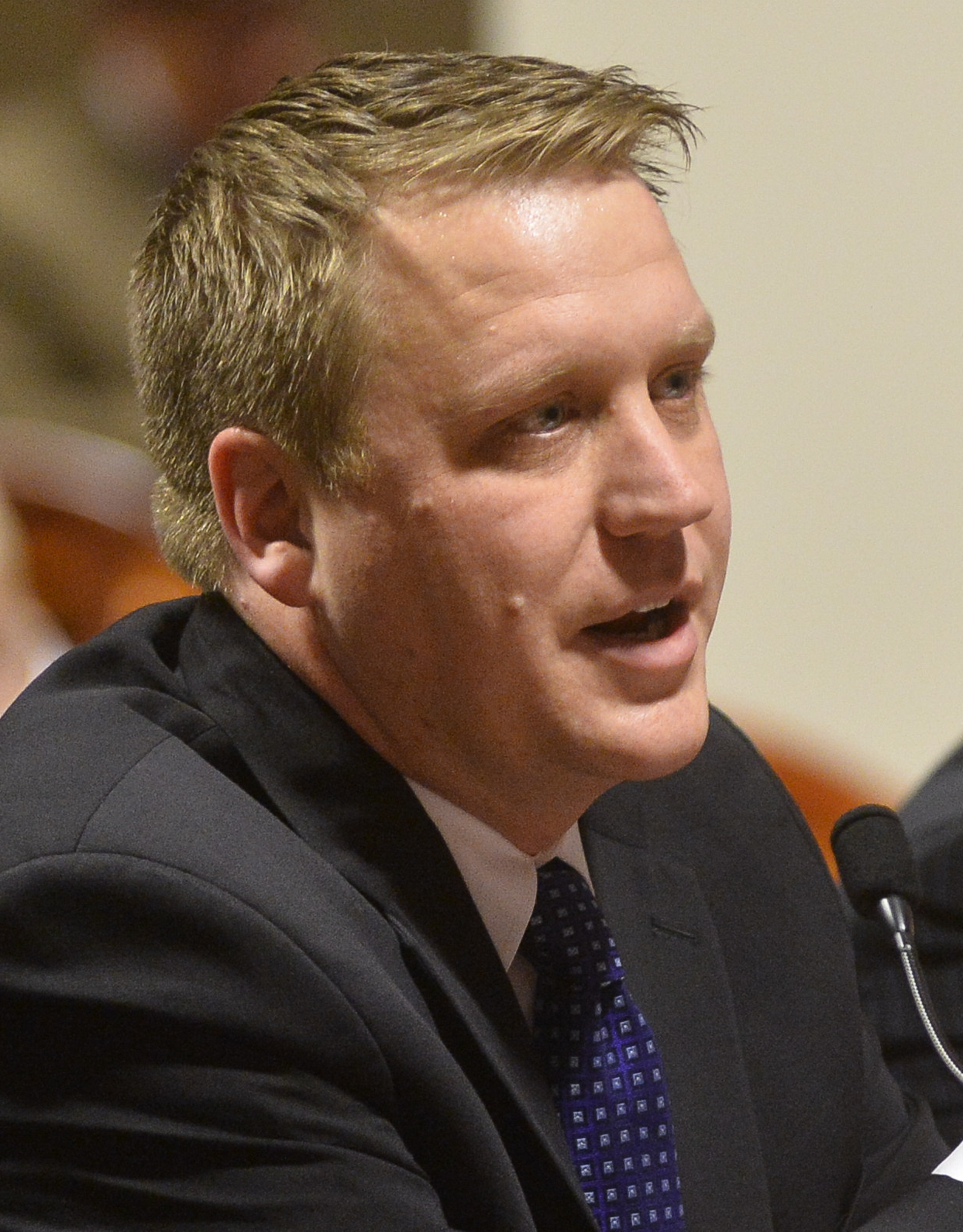

Minority Leader of the Michigan Senate
- Incumbent
- Assumed office January 11, 2023
- Preceded by: Jim Ananich

President pro tempore of the Michigan Senate
- In office January 9, 2019 – January 1, 2023
- Preceded by: Tonya Schuitmaker
- Succeeded by: Jeremy Moss

Member of the Michigan Senate
- Incumbent
- Assumed office January 1, 2019
- Preceded by: Tonya Schuitmaker
- Constituency: 26th district (2019–2022); 20th district (2023–present)

Member of the Michigan House of Representatives
- In office January 1, 2011 – January 1, 2017
- Preceded by: Tonya Schuitmaker
- Succeeded by: Beth Griffin
- Constituency: 80th district (2011–2013); 66th district (2013–2017)

Personal details
- Born: January 25, 1980 (age 46) Kalamazoo, Michigan, U.S.
- Party: Republican
- Spouse: Trisha Nesbitt
- Education: Kalamazoo Valley Community College (attended); Hillsdale College (BA); Norwegian School of Economics (MBA)

Aric Nesbitt (born January 25, 1980) is an American politician who has been a member of the Michigan Senate since 2019. A Republican, he has served as the minority leader of the Michigan Senate since 2023 and previously served as president pro tempore. He previously was a member of the Michigan House of Representatives and served as the Michigan Lottery Commissioner from 2017 to 2018.

== Early life and education ==
Nesbitt graduated from Lawton High School in 1998. During his senior year of high school he was dual enrolled at Kalamazoo Valley Community College. He earned a B.A. in economics from Hillsdale College in December 2001 and later earned his master's degree in international business from the Norwegian School of Economics.

== Personal life ==
He lives south of Lawton, Michigan, with his wife, Trisha, and their three children.

== Electoral history ==
Michigan's 20th Senate District General Election, Nov. 2022
Party	Candidate	Votes	%	±%
Republican	Aric Nesbitt	69,316	61%	+4
Democratic	Kim Jorgensen Gane	44,403	39%	−1

Michigan's 20th Senate District Republican Primary Election, August 2022
Party	Candidate	Votes	%	±%
Republican	Aric Nesbitt	24,691	67%	
Republican	Austin Kreutz	7,853	21%	
Republican	Kaleb M. Hudson	4,172	11%	

Michigan's 26th Senate District General Election, Nov. 2018
Party	Candidate	Votes	%	±%
Republican	Aric Nesbitt	61,509	57%	
Democratic	Garnet Lewis	43,495	40%	
Libertarian	Erwin Haas	2,375	2%	
Green	Robert M. Alway	1,153	1%	

Michigan's 26th Senate District Republican Primary Election, August 2018
Party	Candidate	Votes	%	±%
Republican	Aric Nesbitt	16,529	52%	
Republican	Bob Genetski	9,377	28%	
Republican	Don Wickstra	6,443	20%	

Michigan's 66th District General Election, Nov. 2014
Party	Candidate	Votes	%	±%
Republican	Aric Nesbitt	15,753	58%	
Democratic	Annie Brown	11.646	42%	

Michigan's 66th District General Election, Nov. 2012
Party	Candidate	Votes	%	±%
Republican	Aric Nesbitt	22,990	59%	
Democratic	Richard Rackovich	16,277	41%	

Michigan's 80th District General Election, Nov. 2010
Party	Candidate	Votes	%	±%
Republican	Aric Nesbitt	15,492	62%	
Democratic	Tom Erdmann	7,859	32%	
Libertarian	Bill Bradley	722	3%	
No Party Affiliation	Cheryl Evick	778	3%	

Michigan's 80th District Primary Election, Aug. 2010
Party	Candidate	Votes	%	±%
Republican	Aric Nesbitt	5,458	50%	
Republican	Shelly Hartmann	1,818	17%	
Republican	Frank Thompson	1,697	16%	
Republican	Robert Linderman	801	8%	
Republican	Douglas J. Harrington	769	7%	
Republican	William Queen	204	2%	

Michigan House of Representatives
Preceded by Tonya Schuitmaker	Member of the Michigan House of Representatives from the 80th district 2011–2013	Succeeded by Robert Genetski
Preceded by Bill Rogers	Member of the Michigan House of Representatives from the 66th district 2013–2017	Succeeded by Beth Griffin
Michigan Senate
Preceded by Tonya Schuitmaker	Member of the Michigan Senate from the 26th district 2019–2023	Succeeded by Kevin Daley
Preceded by Sean McCann	Member of the Michigan Senate from the 20th district 2023–present	Incumbent
Preceded by Tonya Schuitmaker	President pro tempore of the Michigan Senate; 2019–2023	Succeeded by Jeremy Moss
Preceded by Jim Ananich	Minority Leader of the Michigan Senate; 2023–present	Incumbent
