= Shubael F. White =

American politician and judge (1841–1914)

Member of the Michigan Senate from the 26th district
- In office 1883–1884
- Preceded by: George A. Farr
- Succeeded by: Edward E. Edwards

Personal details
- Born: January 17, 1841 Marshall, Michigan, U.S.
- Died: October 3, 1914 (aged 73) Duluth, Minnesota, U.S.
- Resting place: Forest Hill Cemetery
- Spouse: Hattie Rogers (m. 1868)
- Children: 2
- Education: University of Olivet; University of Michigan; Albany Law School
- Occupation: Politician; judge; lawyer

Shubael F. White (January 17, 1841 – October 3, 1914) was an American politician and judge from Michigan. He served as Michigan circuit court judge from 1873 to 1874. He later served in the Michigan Senate from 1882 to 1883.

== Early life ==
Shubael F. White was born on January 17, 1841, in Marshall, Michigan. He attended the University of Olivet for two years. He taught while attending college. He later graduated from the literary department at the University of Michigan in 1864.

In 1861, White tried to enlist in the Union Army, but was rejected. After college in 1864, he enlisted as a private in the 28th Michigan Infantry Regiment. He served for two years in the war and was discharged as captain of company A of the regiment. Following the war, he was in charge of North Carolina during reconstruction and served as provost marshal of the District of North Carolina. He mustered out in August 1866. Following his service, he graduated from Albany Law School in 1867 and was admitted to practice law in the same year.

== Career ==
Following graduation from law school, White moved to Ludington, Michigan. He opened a law office on Main Street in Ludington. In 1868, he was elected as prosecuting attorney and served in the role from 1869 to 1870. He was associated with Dr. Ewell from 1871 to 1873. He worked as a judge for the 19th circuit in Ludington from April 1873 to his resignation in March 1874. He was then associated with Judge Haight from 1874 to 1879. In 1879, he became a senior member of the law firm White & McMahon with partner James B. McMahon. He practiced law with McMahon until 1883.

White represented in the Michigan Senate from 1882 to 1883.

White moved to Duluth, Minnesota. In 1893, he started the firm White & McKeon with Thomas J. McKeon in Duluth. He practiced law there and then became a judge. He was commander of Hayes' post and adjutant of the Gorman post.

== Personal life ==
White married Hattie Rogers on May 16, 1868. He had two daughters, Effie and Anna.

White died on October 3, 1914, at his home on Faribault Street in Hunter's Park in Duluth. He was buried in Forest Hill Cemetery.
