= Beth Griffin =

American politician (born 1967)

Member of the Michigan House of Representatives from the 66th district
- In office January 1, 2017 – January 1, 2023
- Preceded by: Aric Nesbitt
- Succeeded by: Josh Schriver

Van Buren County Commissioner
- In office 2013–2016

Personal details
- Born: June 14, 1967 (age 59) Fort Dodge, Iowa, US
- Party: Republican
- Children: 2
- Education: Indiana-Purdue University at Fort Wayne (BA); Old Dominion University (M.S.Ed.)

Beth Griffin (born June 14, 1967) is an American politician from Michigan. She is a former Republican member of Michigan House of Representatives.

== Education ==
In 1991, Griffin earned a Bachelor of Arts degree in psychology from Indiana-Purdue University at Fort Wayne. In 1996, Griffin earned a MSEd degree in Secondary Education English from Old Dominion University in Norfolk, Virginia.

== Career ==
In 1999, Griffin became a teacher at Parchment Middle School until 2005. In addition to teaching English, Griffin also taught Special Education to elementary students. As a business person, Griffin is the owner of Premco Finance. In 2010, Griffin became a guest teacher at Mattawan Consolidated Schools.

In 2010, Griffin became the founder and chair person of Mattawan Area Pantry, a nonprofit organization that serves Mattawan School District in Michigan.

In 2012, Griffin became the Vice President of Van Buren County Women's Republican Party.

In 2013, Griffin served as a Commissioner of Van Buren County for two terms until 2016. During Griffin's second term, she was also a Vice Chair person of the Board of Commissioners.

On November 8, 2016, Griffin won the election and became a Republican member of Michigan House of Representatives for District 66. Griffin defeated Democrat Annie Brown with 54.26% of the votes. On November 6, 2018, as an incumbent, Griffin won the election and continued serving District 66. Griffin defeated Dan Seibert with 56.82% of the votes. The 66th House District includes Van Buren County, city of Parchment, Cooper Township, and Alamo Township in Kalamazoo County, Michigan.

== Awards ==
- 2019 Legislator of the Year. Presented by Michigan Manufacturers Association (September 10, 2019).

== Personal life ==
She has two children. Griffin and her family live in Mattawan, Michigan. For several years, Griffin served as chapter president of ACT for America, which has been designated as an anti-Muslim "hate group" by the Southern Poverty Law Center.

== See also ==
- 2016 Michigan House of Representatives election
- 2018 Michigan House of Representatives election
