= Tonya Schuitmaker =

American politician (born 1968)

President pro tempore of the Michigan Senate
- In office January 12, 2011 – January 9, 2019
- Preceded by: Randy Richardville
- Succeeded by: Aric Nesbitt

Member of the Michigan Senate from the 26th district
- In office January 1, 2011 – January 1, 2019
- Preceded by: Tom George
- Succeeded by: Aric Nesbitt

Member of the Michigan House of Representatives from the 80th district 20th district (2011–2014)
- In office January 1, 2005 – January 1, 2011
- Preceded by: Mary Ann Middaugh
- Succeeded by: Aric Nesbitt

Personal details
- Born: March 10, 1968 (age 58)
- Party: Republican
- Spouse: Steve Mucci
- Education: Michigan State University (BA, JD)

Tonya Schuitmaker (born March 10, 1968) is an American politician. She is a member of the Republican party who represented the 26th district of the Michigan Senate from 2011 to 2018. She was the President Pro Tempore of the Senate for the duration of her term in office.

Prior to her election to the Senate, she served three terms in the Michigan State House of Representatives. She was elected to the Michigan House of Representatives in November 2004, 2006, and 2008. In that time she represented Michigan's 80th House District, which included Van Buren County, the city of Otsego, and the townships of Otsego and Watson in Allegan County.

She was a candidate for Attorney General of Michigan in the 2018 election.

== Education ==
Schuitmaker graduated in 1986 from Mattawan High School. She earned a B.A. in business from Michigan State University in 1990 and a J.D. from the Detroit College of Law in 1993.

== Professional career ==
Schuitmaker was a partner in her family's law firm of Schuitmaker, Cooper and Schuitmaker. At her family's firm, Schuitmaker focused on estate, family, business and governmental law. She is licensed to practice law in Michigan, Florida, and Illinois. Prior to her election to the Michigan House of Representatives, Schuitmaker unsuccessfully ran for an open Van Buren County Circuit Judge seat in 1996.

== Community involvement ==
Schuitmaker has served on the State of Michigan Board of Medicine, the Van Buren Community Mental Health Board, and the Intercare Community Health Network. She is also a member of the Van Buren County Community Corrections Advisory Board. Schuitmaker is involved with the Paw Paw Rotary, the Paw Paw Optimist Club, Daughters of the American Revolution, and the Farm Bureau. She has also served as president of the Van Buren County Republican Women and as Vice-Chair for Van Buren County Republicans. Schuitmaker was named a 2014 Aspen Institute Rodel Fellow.

== Personal life ==
Schuitmaker, her husband Steve, and their two children, Jordan and Savina, live in Lawton, Michigan.

== See also ==
- 2008 Michigan House of Representatives election

Michigan House of Representatives
Preceded by Mary Ann Middaugh	Member of the Michigan House of Representatives from the 80th district 2005–2011	Succeeded by Aric Nesbitt
Michigan Senate
Preceded by Tom George	Member of the Michigan Senate from the 20th district 2011–2015	Succeeded by Margaret O'Brien
Preceded by David B. Robertson	Member of the Michigan Senate from the 26th district 2015–2019	Succeeded by Aric Nesbitt
Preceded by Randy Richardville	President pro tempore of the Michigan Senate; 2011–2019	Succeeded by Aric Nesbitt
