= George A. Farr =

American politician (1842–1914)

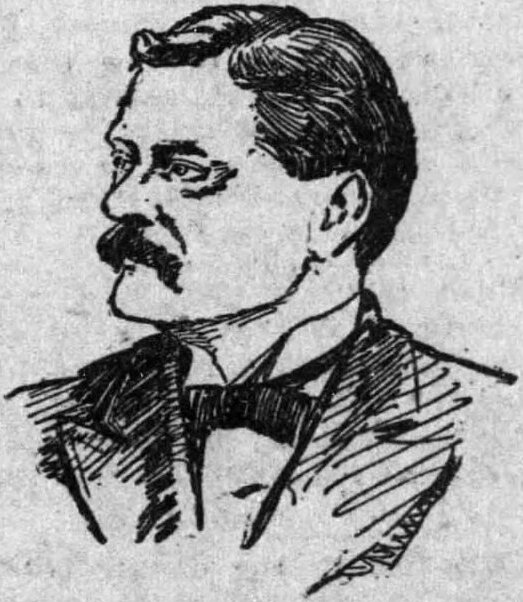
- Sketch of Farr in a 1901 newspaper

Member of the Michigan Senate from the 26th district
- In office 1879–1882
- Preceded by: Charles D. Nelson
- Succeeded by: Shubael F. White

Personal details
- Born: July 27, 1842 Tonawanda, New York, U.S.
- Died: August 4, 1914 (aged 72) Grand Haven, Michigan, U.S.
- Resting place: Lake Forest Cemetery
- Party: Republican
- Spouse: Susie C. Slayton (m. 1879)
- Children: 7
- Education: Michigan Agricultural College
- Occupation: Politician; educator

George A. Farr (July 27, 1842 – August 4, 1914) was an American politician from Michigan. He served in the Michigan Senate.

== Early life and education ==
George A. Farr was born on July 27, 1842, in Tonawanda, New York. At the age of 12, he came to Michigan to live between Adrian and Toledo. He lived on the farm there for three more years.

Farr enlisted in company K of the 1st Michigan Infantry Regiment for three months. He was present at the First Battle of Bull Run. He was discharged and re-enlisted and served as a sergeant of 4th U.S. Artillery, Battery M. He then attended Michigan Agricultural College. He taught intermittently and completed a law course and graduated in 1870.

== Career ==
Following graduation, Farr lived in Coopersville. He then moved to Grand Haven. By 1876, he had his own law practice in Grand Haven.

Farr was a Republican. He served in the Michigan Senate from 1879 to 1882. He was appointed by Governor John T. Rich to replace Charles Hackley as the regent of the University of Michigan on January 11, 1896. He worked as collector of customs for the port of Grand Haven from 1897 to 1906. He also served as city attorney, member of the board of education, and district trustee of the Northern Michigan Insane Asylum. He was vice president of the Grand Haven State Bank.

== Personal life ==
Farr married Susie C. Slayton of Stowe, Vermont, in 1879. They had one son and six daughters, George A. Jr., Mrs. Dan F. Zimmerman, Mrs. H. B. Cornell, Mrs. Leroy W. Ranney, Leslie, Carrie, and Sue.

Farr died on August 4, 1914, at his home on Howard Street in Grand Haven. He was buried in Lake Forest Cemetery.
