= Isaac A. Fancher =

American politician (1833–1934)

Member of the Michigan Senate from the 26th district
- In office 1875–1876
- Preceded by: Ralph Ely
- Succeeded by: Charles D. Nelson

Member of the Michigan House of Representatives from the Midland, Isabella, and Clare counties district
- In office 1873–1874
- In office 1868–1868

Personal details
- Born: Isaac Alger Fancher; September 30, 1833 Florida, Montgomery County, New York, U.S.
- Died: March 19, 1934 (aged 100) Mount Pleasant, Michigan, U.S.
- Party: Republican
- Spouse(s): Althea May Preston (m. 1860; died 1900) Mattie Dodds (m. 1902)
- Children: 4
- Occupation: Politician; lawyer; businessman

Isaac Alger Fancher (September 30, 1833 – March 19, 1934) was an American politician and lawyer from Michigan. He was one of the original settlers of Mount Pleasant, Michigan, and served as its mayor for one term. He served twice in the Michigan House of Representatives and once in the Michigan Senate.

== Early life ==
Isaac Alger Fancher was born on September 30, 1833, in Florida, Montgomery County, New York, to Eunice (née Alger) and Jacob Schuyler Fancher. At the age of four, his father died. He attended school in the summer and worked on the farm from the ages of 11 to 15. He attended school in Duanesburg for one year and then continued working on the farm. At the age of 19, he attended Princetown Academy for three terms and then attended Amsterdam Academy for nine months. In September 1856, he left for Kilbourn City, Wisconsin. He taught school during the winter months in Delton, Wisconsin. In the spring of 1857, he returned to New York for a short time before moving near Rochester, Minnesota, and buying 80 acres (32 ha) of land. He then sold that land and went to Iowa to purchase land for a friend and then returned to Delton. In the fall of 1859, he studied law under Jonathan Bowman at his office in Newport for about 14 months. He then attended Albany Law School in Albany, New York, for about six months. He was admitted to the bar in Albany and later in Baraboo, Wisconsin.

== Career ==
In 1862, Fancher started practicing law in Kilbourn City. In 1862, he led a party to Oregon, but they instead navigated to Humboldt Range of Nevada on a silver mining expedition. He settled with the party near Minersville for a time. He continued on as a mule driver to the west coast and San Francisco. He got ill with Panama fever in California and stayed on the west coast for a few months. In January 1863, he arrived in New York City and remained with his mother in Schenectady County for about seven months.

In the spring of 1863, Fancher set up a business in Kilbourn City. He moved and arrived in Mount Pleasant, Michigan, on July 4, 1863. He was admitted to the bar in Michigan in January 1864. He studied civil engineering. He became deputy register of deeds and deputy state swamp road commissioner. From 1865 to 1867, he surveyed hundreds of miles or roads in Isabella and Gratiot counties. He helped choose the site for the Central State Teachers' College and was one of its founders. He also helped establish the government's Indian school. He also helped organize the founding of churches and railroads in the area. He raised US$15,000 to construct the Coleman branch of the Pere Marquette Railway, called then the Saginaw & Mount Pleasant Railroad. He served as vice president and director of the railroad board before its transfer to the Flint & Pere Marquette Company. He helped raised US$400,000 to construct the Lansing, St. Johns, Mackinaw Railroad, but was unsuccessful because the bonds were held unconstitutional by the supreme court. He helped organize a road from Owosso, Ithaca, Alma and Mount Pleasant. The road fell through when Michigan Central Railroad Company backed out, but later the Ann Arbor Railroad Company added stock to allow the railroad to be built. In 1865, he brought a mill site. He sold it to Hapner Brothers and later bought the grist mill from them. He bought a steam lumber mill built by Owen & Clinton. He sold the lumber mill to A. B. Upton. At one point, he owned 169 lots in Mount Pleasant.

Fancher was a Republican. In 1868, he was elected to the Michigan House of Representatives, representing Midland, Isabella, and Clare counties. After securing the passage of his bills, he left his seat and came home. This seat was contested by a Mr. Newman of Alpena due to reported irregularities in voting. In 1870, he was census commissioner for Isabella and Clare counties. He was elected again to the Michigan House in 1873. He then helped pass a bill on taxing railroads. He was elected to the Michigan Senate in 1875, serving one term. He helped pass a resolution to credit Isabella County with US$10,000 from the Michigan auditor general. He served as mayor of Mount Pleasant for one term. He was postmaster and city attorney of Mount Pleasant and prosecuting attorney of Isabella County for six years. He also served as county engineer and was a member of the city school board. From 1878 to 1880, he was a member of the state central committee. He was chairman of the county Republican committee for 15 years.

In 1875, Fancher and Peter F. Dodds started the law firm Dodds and Fancher. Later, Dodds's brother Peter Dodds joined the firm. Fancher withdrew from the firm in 1882. He was admitted to practice law in the U.S. courts in Detroit and Grand Rapids. He practiced in Detroit for two years starting in 1882. He participated in the case of the Auditor General v. Sarah Williams, which was decided in the Michigan supreme court in 1892. T. F. Shepherd and Fancher defended Sarah Williams and the court determined that she was not subject to taxation. He also won the Hursh case, which was about a portion of the property of Central State Teachers' College. He then returned to Mount Pleasant and continued practicing law. In 1885, he built a two-story business block and it was later destroyed by fire.

In May 1892, Fancher was one of 16 that met to form a company to establish a normal school called Central Normal in Mount Pleasant. He was on the board of control of the state school in Coldwater. Following hearing loss, he gave up practicing law at the age of 85. He wrote a book about the history of Isabella County.

== Personal life ==
At the age of 21, Fancher became a member of the Odd Fellows. In 1858, he joined the Masons. In 1913, he became a life member of the Masons. Fancher married Althea May Preston, daughter of Mary (née Fisk) and William Preston and of Java, New York, on June 6, 1860. They had a son and two daughters, Preston Schuyler, Blanche M., and Bessie Rhea. His wife died in 1900. He married Mattie (née Pettit) Dodds on July 3, 1902. They had a son, Isaac Alger.

Fancher died on March 19, 1934, at his home in Mount Pleasant.

== Legacy ==
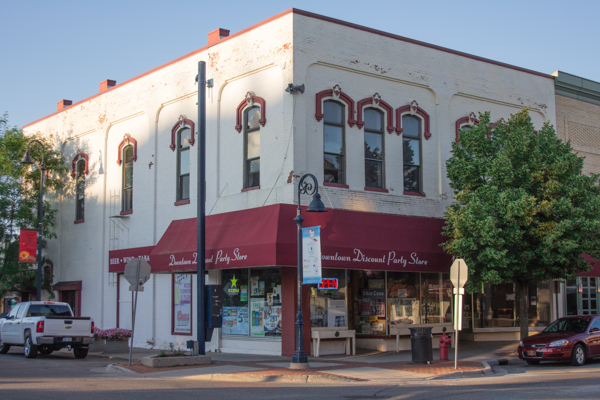
Isaac Fancher Building in Mount Pleasant

Fancher Avenue, a residential district in Mount Pleasant was named after him. In 1877, he built Fancher Block, a business block that was named after him. A grade school in Mount Pleasant was named after him. On September 30, 1933, Central State Teachers College designated the day in honor of Fancher and his 100th birthday.
