= Estelle, Georgia =

Unincorporated community in Georgia, U.S.

Coordinates: 34°44′49″N 85°20′28″W

Estelle is an unincorporated community in Walker County, in the U.S. state of Georgia.

== History ==
A post office called Estelle was established in 1883, and remained in operation until it was discontinued in 1905. The community took its name from the Estelle Mining Company.
