= August 2014 United States floods =

Severe weather event in August 2014

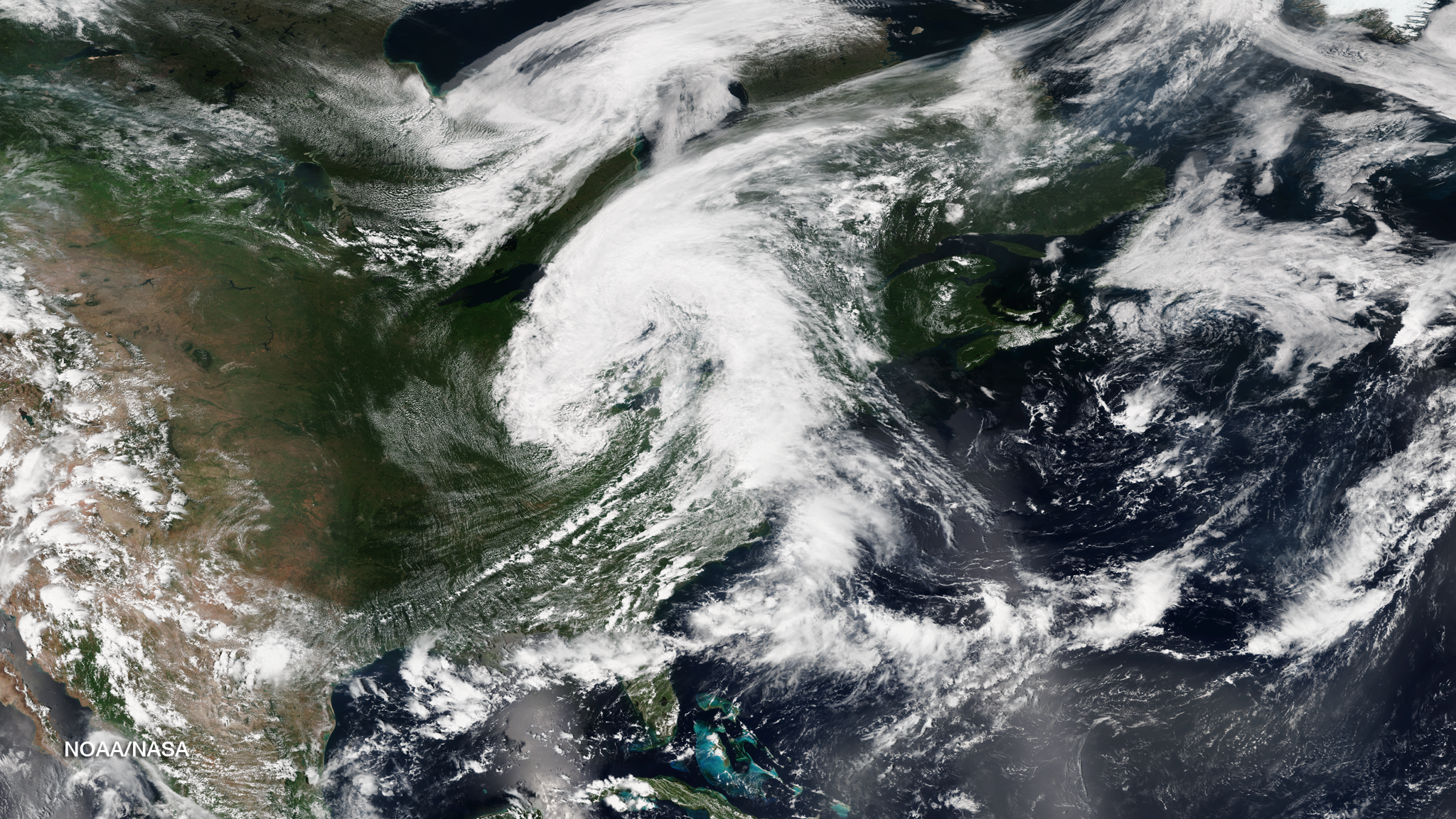
- The system responsible for the New York floods
- Cause: Heavy rains

Meteorological history
- Duration: August 11–13, 2014

Flood
- Max. rainfall: 13.57 in (345 mm) Islip, New York

Overall effects
- Fatalities: 3
- Injuries: 1
- Damage: $1.837 billion
- Areas affected: Mid-Atlantic

In a three-day period on August 11–13, 2014, flooding occurred across Michigan, New York, particularly Long Island, and portions of Maryland. Numerous water rescues and evacuations occurred across expressways and residential areas, and caused three fatalities and one injury. Additionally, several rainfall records were broken across the three primarily affected states, and a flash flood emergency was issued for portions of the Washington–Baltimore combined statistical area. The event was regarded as the largest natural disaster in 2014 in the United States by the American Red Cross and the Federal Emergency Management Agency.

== Meteorological synopsis ==
A slow-moving low-pressure area moved across the eastern United States, bringing flooding to southeastern Michigan which caused two deaths. The upper-level trough then pulled moisture plume from the Atlantic Ocean. The trough, combined with the moisture plume, then stalled over northern portions of the Mid-Atlantic, bringing high rainfall rates.

== Impact and aftermath ==
=== Michigan ===
Daily rainfall records were broken in Detroit, Flint, and Saginaw, with Detroit recording its second-heaviest rainfall event when 4.57 in (116 mm) of rain fell at Detroit Metropolitan Airport on August 11. Portions of Interstate 696 and Interstate 75 were closed as vehicles were submerged in floodwaters. In suburban portions of Detroit, peak rainfall amounts of 6.25 inches (159 mm) were recorded. The American Automobile Association received over 700 calls for assistance in 12 hours, and heavy rainfall caused river levels to rise. At Baker College near Allen Park, floods stranded 60 students and forced a portion of Interstate 94 to close. Detroit Zoo closed as a result of flood damage there. There were 32,000 power outages during the flood event, and flood damage totaled $1.8 billion. In excess of 100,000 homes were damaged across Macomb, Oakland, and Wayne counties as a result of the flooding. Floodwaters across southeastern portions of the state were combined with nearly 10 billion gallons of sewer overflow. The flooding in Michigan was described as a "1-in-500 year event", and also regarded as the largest United States natural disaster in 2014 by the American Red Cross and the Federal Emergency Management Agency. A Grosse Pointe local called Brian Benz saved an elderly man on I-696 and Van Dyke by driving 2 hours through the flood with his son.

On September 25, 2014, United States President Barack Obama approved a disaster declaration requested by Michigan governor Rick Snyder that was requested over a week prior. On May 13, 2016, nearly two years after the floods, multiple lawsuits, including a class action lawsuit, were filed against the cities of Clawson and Royal Oak for poor handling of the impacts of the severe weather event. Additionally, low-income tenants did not receive aid from the Federal Emergency Management Agency, which resulted in the tenants dealing with toxic mold in their flood-damaged homes in 2016.

=== New York ===
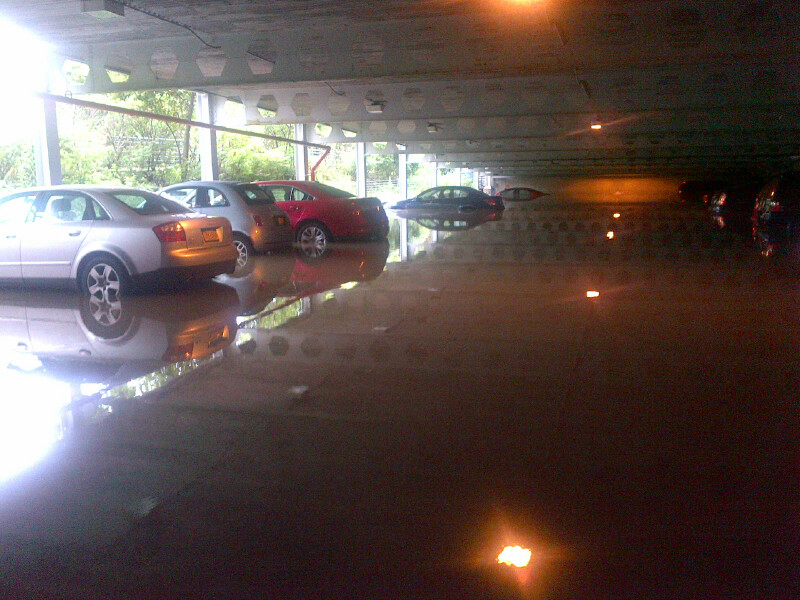
Flooding at a parking garage at Ronkonkoma station

On the Southern State Parkway, 47 vehicles were inundated by floodwaters, trapping 52 people. The Long Island Rail Road experienced significant delays. Flights were delayed at Macarthur Airport. In Islip, 13.57 in (345 mm) of rain fell in a 24-hour period, setting a new 24-hour rainfall record for New York and breaking the previous record set during Hurricane Irene. At Macarthur Airport, 5.37 in (136 mm) of rain fell in just one hour. Portions of Interstate 495, New York State Route 27, New York State Route 135, the Southern State Parkway, and County Route 83 closed. Numerous state parks, including Bethpage State Park, Brentwood State Park, Hither Hills State Park and Belmont State Park closed due to flooding. A baseball game at Yankee Stadium between the New York Yankees and Baltimore Orioles was postponed. One fatality and one injury occurred after a weather-related crash on Interstate 495. A state of emergency was declared for Suffolk County, and for the town of Brookhaven, and Islip mayor Thomas Croci signed a state of emergency declaration. Flood damage in the state totaled $35.2 million.

=== Elsewhere ===
In Maryland, flash flood emergencies were issued in the Washington–Baltimore combined statistical area, with the Baltimore Harbor Tunnel and parts of the Baltimore Beltway closed due to flooding. Portions of Interstate 295 closed between the Baltimore Beltway and Westport. Baltimore/Washington International Airport received 6.3 in (160 mm) of rain, which, in the Baltimore metropolitan area, was the second-wettest day on record.

In Millville, New Jersey, basements were flooded and some collapsed. Near Branford, Connecticut, vehicles were submerged by floodwaters on Interstate 95. Significant flooding also occurred in Portland, Maine, where 6.44 in (164 mm) of rain fell, becoming the wettest day in the city not related to a tropical cyclone.
