= Bishop Foley Catholic High School =

Location
- 32000 Campbell Road; Madison Heights, Michigan 48071; United States; 42°31′42″N 83°7′29″W

Information
- Type: Private school
- Religious affiliation: Roman Catholic
- Established: 1965
- Authority: Roman Catholic Archdiocese of Detroit
- Principal: Dr. Cormac Lynn
- Teaching staff: 23.9 (on an FTE basis)
- Grades: 9–12
- Enrollment: 312 (2019-20)
- Student to teacher ratio: 13.1
- Campus size: 20.54 acres
- Colors: Black, white and gold
- Athletics conference: Catholic High School League
- Nickname: Ventures
- Accreditation: Cognia
- Tuition: $13,950 (2026-2027)

Bishop Foley Catholic High School is a Catholic high school affiliated with the Roman Catholic Archdiocese of Detroit. Founded in 1965, it is named after the first American Bishop of Detroit, John Samuel Foley. It is located in Madison Heights, Michigan.

== Description ==
Bishop Foley Catholic High School has an enrollment of approximately 300 students as of the 2021–2022 school year. It is governed by an advisory elected Board of Education, but the final power rests with the President, who has always been the pastor of one of the school's two founding parishes: (the now defunct) St. Dennis Church in Royal Oak, or Guardian Angels Church in Clawson. Bishop Foley is accredited by Cognia.

== History ==
Bishop Foley Catholic High School opened in 1965 and was founded by Guardian Angels Church in Clawson and St. Dennis Church in Royal Oak. The first class graduated in 1969. The school was initially separated by gender; the effects of this policy can still be seen in the building as all men's restrooms are all on the north side and all women's bathrooms are on the south side.

For several years, the Detroit Mechanix of the American Ultimate Disc League played their home games at Bishop Foley.

== Demographics ==
The demographic breakdown of the 312 students enrolled for 2019-20 was:

- Native American/Alaskan - 0.3&
- Asian - 3.8%
- Black - 2.6%
- Hispanic - 3.8%
- White - 84.4%
- Native Hawaiian/Pacific islanders - 0.6%
- Multiracial - 4.5%

== Athletics ==
The Bishop Foley Ventures compete in the Catholic High School League. School colors are black, white and gold. The following Michigan High School Athletic Association (MHSAA) sanctioned sports are offered:

- Baseball (boys)
  - State champion - 2011, 2012, 2013, 2017
- Basketball (boys and girls)
- Bowling (boys and girls)
- Competitive cheerleading (girls)
  - State champion - 1996
- Cross country (boys and girls)
- Football (boys)
- Golf (boys and girls)
- Ice hockey (boys)
- LaCrosse (boys)
- Skiing (boys)
- Soccer (boys and girls)
  - Girls state champion - 1988, 1990, 1993, 1994, 1995, 1997, 1998, 1999, 2001, 2002, 2003, 2011
  - Boys state champion - 1988, 1997
- Softball (girls)
- Swim and dive (boys and girls)
- Tennis (girls)
- Track and field (boys and girls)
- Volleyball (girls)
- Wrestling (boys)

== Notable alumni and former students ==
- Porcelain Black - singer (attended, did not graduate)
- Mark Campbell, National Football League (NFL) tight end
- Sean Collins, professional hockey player (attended, did not graduate)
- Scott Hanson, television anchor and NFL reporter
- Doug Hutchison, American actor (attended, did not graduate)
- Tom Jankiewicz, screenwriter
- John Keating, Fox Sports Detroit sportscaster
- Michealene Risley, author
