= Monte Geralds =

American politician

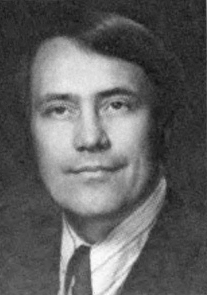
Monte Geralds c. 1977

Monte Robert Geralds (September 10, 1934 – April 23, 2014) was an American politician and lawyer.

Born in Huntington, West Virginia, Geralds settled in Pleasant Ridge, Michigan and received his law degree from Wayne State University. He moved to Madison Heights, Michigan with his wife Barbara, and practiced law. Geralds served on the Madison Heights City Council and was mayor.

Geralds was then elected to the Michigan House of Representatives as a Democrat. He was expelled from that body, after being convicted, in 1978 for having embezzled $24,000 from a client in his law practice.
