= Madison Heights, Michigan =

- City
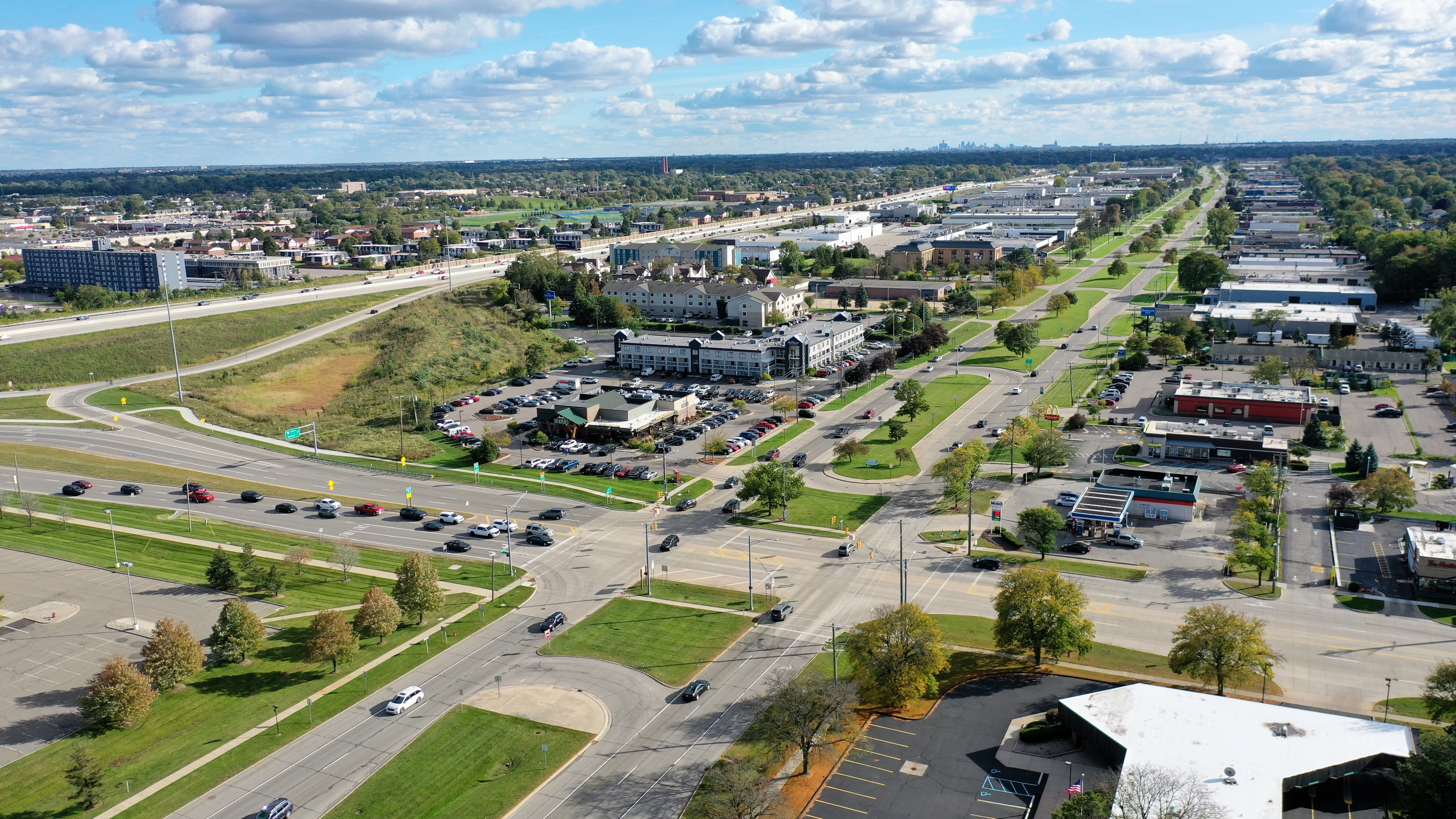
- Aerial view of Madison Heights

- Flag Seal

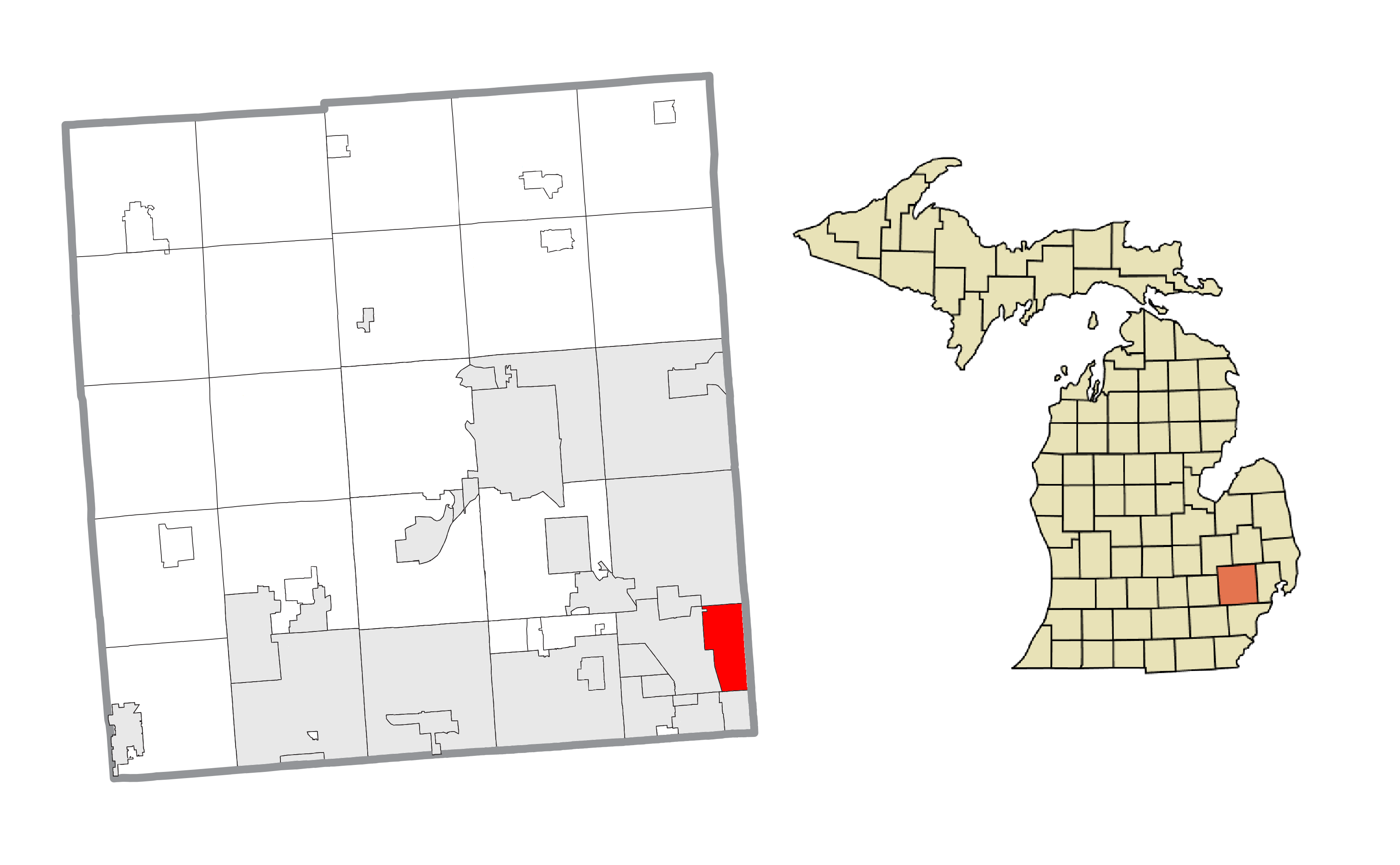
- Location within Oakland County

- Location within the state of Michigan
- Coordinates: 42°29′09″N 83°06′19″W
- Country: United States
- State: Michigan
- County: Oakland
- Incorporated: 1955

Government
  - Mayor: Corey K. Haines
  - City Manager: Melissa R. Marsh
  - Clerk: Mary Daley
  - Treasurer: Linda Kunath

Area
  - City: 7.08 sq mi (18.35 km^{2})
  - Land: 7.08 sq mi (18.35 km^{2})
  - Water: 0 sq mi (0.00 km^{2})
- Elevation: 633 ft (193 m)

Population (2020)
  - City: 28,468
  - Density: 4,017.5/sq mi (1,551.15/km^{2})
  - Metro: 4,296,250 (Metro Detroit)
- Time zone: UTC-5 (EST)
  - Summer (DST): UTC-4 (EDT)
- ZIP code(s): 48071
- Area codes: 248 and 947
- FIPS code: 26-50560
- GNIS feature ID: 0631311
- Website: Official website

Madison Heights is a city in Oakland County in the U.S. state of Michigan. An inner-ring suburb of Detroit, Madison Heights is located roughly 12 miles (19.3 km) north of downtown Detroit. As of the 2020 census, the city had a population of 28,468.

== History ==
Originally part of Royal Oak Township, Madison Heights incorporated as a city by popular vote on January 17, 1955, and chartered on December 6 of that same year, becoming the tenth city government in southern Oakland County. At that time, the 7.2 square miles (18.6 km^{2}) city was one of the largest suburban communities in the Metro Detroit area. The first city hall was at 26305 John R Road, the former township offices. On April 5, 1963, a new municipal building was dedicated which is on the present location at 300 West Thirteen Mile Road. The city lies in the Interstate 696 (I-696) and I-75 corridor

== Geography ==
According to the United States Census Bureau, the city has a total area of 7.09 square miles (18.36 km^{2}), all land.

Although 91% of the buildings in Madison Heights are single-family homes or condominiums (approximately 9,800 residential property owners), 60% of the tax base is fueled by light industrial or commercial property. The city has 15 voting precincts, totaling more than 21,000 registered voters.

Madison Heights shares borders with Troy to the north, Royal Oak to the west, Hazel Park to the south, and Warren to the east. The eastern border of Madison Heights (Dequindre Road) is also the border between Oakland and Macomb counties.

There are more than 112 miles (180 km) of road within Madison Heights, of which the city maintains 105 miles (169 km), 95 miles (153 km) for snow removal, sweeping, and patching. Interstate 75 passes north to south on the west side of the city, and Interstate 696 is the major feature of its southern border. The junction of these two highways is shared with Royal Oak and Hazel Park on the southwest corner of Madison Heights.

== Demographics ==
Historical population
Census	Pop.	Note	%±
1960	33,343		—
1970	38,599		15.8%
1980	35,375		−8.4%
1990	31,296		−11.5%
2000	31,101		−0.6%
2010	29,694		−4.5%
2020	28,468		−4.1%
2025 (est.)	28,295		−0.6%
U.S. Decennial Census

=== 2020 census ===
As of the 2020 census, Madison Heights had a population of 28,468 and a population density of 4,017.5/sq mi.

The median age was 38.6 years. 16.5% of residents were under the age of 18 and 16.6% were 65 years of age or older. For every 100 females there were 99.6 males, and for every 100 females age 18 and over there were 98.4 males age 18 and over.

100.0% of residents lived in urban areas, while 0.0% lived in rural areas.

There were 13,300 households, of which 20.0% had children under the age of 18 living in them. Of all households, 33.0% were married-couple households, 26.6% were households with a male householder and no spouse or partner present, and 31.5% were households with a female householder and no spouse or partner present. About 38.8% of all households were made up of individuals and 13.0% had someone living alone who was 65 years of age or older.

There were 13,993 housing units, of which 5.0% were vacant. The homeowner vacancy rate was 1.0% and the rental vacancy rate was 6.7%.

Racial composition as of the 2020 census
Race	Number	Percent
White	21,938	77.1%
Black or African American	2,227	7.8%
American Indian and Alaska Native	84	0.3%
Asian	2,003	7.0%
Native Hawaiian and Other Pacific Islander	1	0.0%
Some other race	380	1.3%
Two or more races	1,835	6.4%
Hispanic or Latino (of any race)	1,032	3.6%

=== American Community Survey ===
According to the U.S. Census Bureau's QuickFacts, 14.7% of households spoke a language other than English at home. People under 65 years of age with a disability accounted for 11.1% of the population, 11.7% of residents lived below the federal poverty line, and 11.9% of households lacked a broadband internet subscription.

=== 2010 census ===
As of the census of 2010, there were 29,694 people, 12,712 households, and 7,543 families residing in the city. The population density was 4,188.2 inhabitants per square mile (1,617.1/km^{2}). There were 13,685 housing units at an average density of 1,930.2 per square mile (745.3/km^{2}). The racial makeup of the city was 83.9% White, 6.4% African American, 0.5% Native American, 5.8% Asian, 0.1% Pacific Islander, 0.7% from other races, and 2.7% from two or more races. Hispanic or Latino residents of any race were 2.5% of the population.

There were 12,712 households, of which 27.5% had children under the age of 18 living with them, 41.0% were married couples living together, 12.9% had a female householder with no husband present, 5.4% had a male householder with no wife present, and 40.7% were non-families. 34.1% of all households were made up of individuals, and 11.8% had someone living alone who was 65 years of age or older. The average household size was 2.32 and the average family size was 3.02.

The median age in the city was 38.3 years. 20.4% of residents were under the age of 18; 8.7% were between the ages of 18 and 24; 30.4% were from 25 to 44; 26.6% were from 45 to 64; and 13.9% were 65 years of age or older. The gender makeup of the city was 49.1% male and 50.9% female.

=== 2000 census ===
As of the 2000 United States census, there were 31,101 people, 13,299 households, and 8,005 families residing in the city. The population density was 4,341.3 inhabitants per square mile (1,676.2/km^{2}). There were 13,623 housing units at an average density of 1,901.6 per square mile (734.2/km^{2}). The city's racial makeup was 89.60% White, 1.82% African American, 0.44% Native American, 4.97% Asian, 0.03% Pacific Islander, 0.46% from other races, and 2.68% from two or more races. Hispanic or Latino residents of any race were 1.61% of the population.

There were 13,299 households, of which 26.9% had children under the age of 18 living with them, 45.2% were married couples living together, 10.5% had a female householder with no husband present, and 39.8% were non-families. 33.8% of all households were made up of individuals, and 12.3% had someone living alone who was 65 years of age or older. The average household size was 2.33 and the average family size was 3.02.

In the city, 22.1% of the population was under the age of 18, 8.1% was from 18 to 24, 35.4% from 25 to 44, 20.2% from 45 to 64, and 14.2% was 65 years of age or older. The median age was 36 years. For every 100 females, there were 95.8 males. For every 100 females age 18 and over, there were 92.9 males.

The city's median household income was $42,326, and the median family income was $51,364. Males had a median income of $41,478 versus $29,345 for females. The city's per capita income was $21,429. About 7.0% of families and 8.9% of the population were below the poverty line, including 10.8% of those under age 18 and 13.0% of those age 65 or over.

=== Asian community ===
Saigon Market in Madison Heights during Vietnamese New Year (Tết)

In 2008, 1.9% of the Madison Heights population were of Vietnamese descent. This concentration of ethnic Vietnamese is higher compared to those of other area municipalities. 168 Asian Mart, a 38,000-square-foot (3,500 m^{2}) supermarket, is the largest Asian supermarket in southeast Michigan, and one of the largest in the state. Nicole Rupersburg of Metro D Media reported that a few Vietnamese businesses were started in the area, and then snowballed into having a high concentration of businesses for ethnic Vietnamese and other East and Southeast Asian ethnic groups. The Chinese Cultural Center is in Madison Heights.

== Economy ==
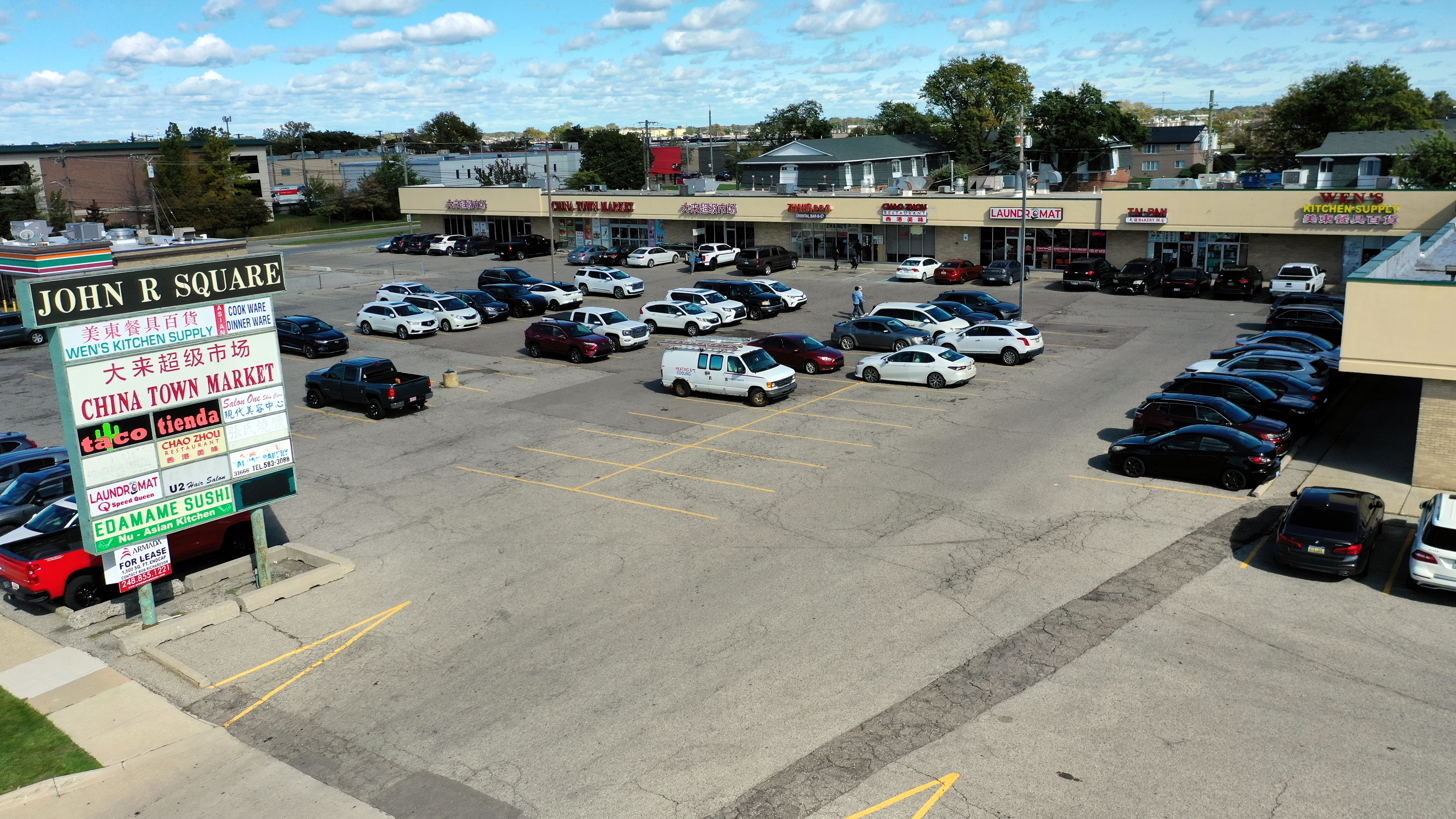
John R Square strip mall

Madison Heights is part of Oakland County's Automation Alley. There are more than 1,300 commercial and industrial businesses and services within the city's 7.2 square miles (18.6 km^{2}), and the city has a majority of small businesses, as well as more than 100 major companies within its borders.

The city has 23 shopping centers, 11 hotels, more than 860,000 square feet (80,000 m^{2}) of office space, and seven industrial parks that include 10,000,000 square feet (900,000 m^{2}).

== Government ==
Residents in Madison Heights elected Corey K. Haines on Nov. 4, 2025.

The previous mayor of Madison Heights is Roslyn Grafstein, who was appointed as Mayor in August 2020 to fill a vacant seat.

=== Federal, state, and county legislators ===
United States House of Representatives
District	Representative	Party	Since
11th	Haley Stevens	Democratic	2023 (Note: Stevens has represented the 11th district since 2019, but the district has only included Madison Heights since 2023.)

Michigan Senate
District	Senator	Party	Since
3rd	Stephanie Chang	Democratic	2023

Michigan House of Representatives
District	Representative	Party	Since
8th	Mike McFall	Democratic	2023
57th	Thomas Kuhn	Republican	2023

Oakland County Board of Commissioners
District	Commissioner	Party	Since
3	Ann Erickson Gault	Democratic	2023

== Education ==
Madison District Public Schools (to the south) and Lamphere Public Schools (to the north) have public schools serving Madison Heights, with much of the municipality divided among the two districts. Small portions are in the Royal Oak City School District.

Four Corners Montessori Academy is a public charter school.

Bishop Foley Catholic High School is a private school. It is affiliated with the Roman Catholic Archdiocese of Detroit.

Madison Heights Public Library serves residents with the mission to provide access to information which meets the educational, cultural, and recreational needs of the community. The library was established as a Home Rule City Library.

== Infrastructure ==
=== Public safety ===
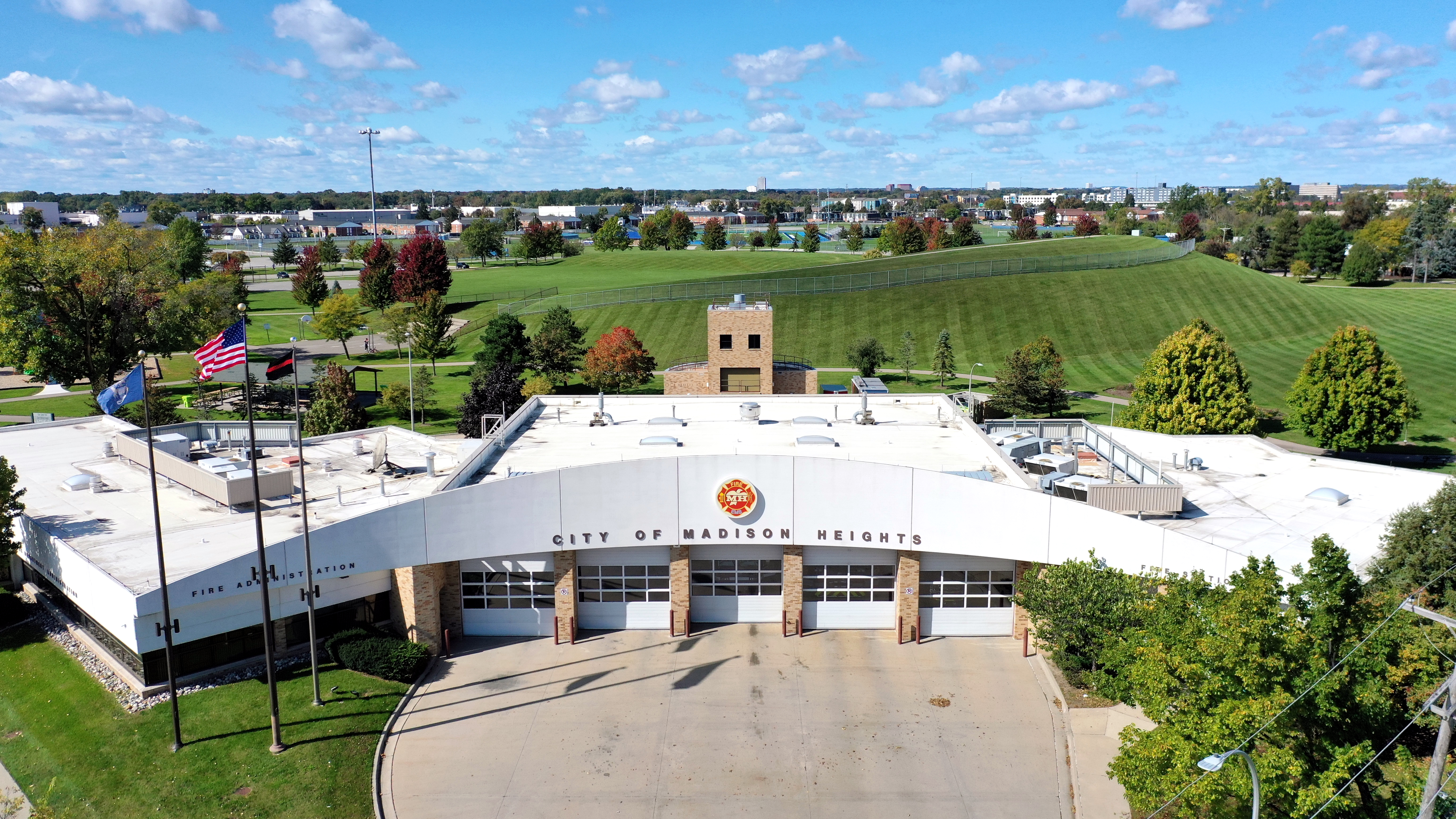
Madison Heights Fire Department Station 1 (headquarters)

The Madison Heights Police Department has 44 sworn officers. The Madison Heights Fire Department provides fire prevention and EMS services, employing 25 firefighters in two stations.

The city is the site of the George W. Kuhn Retention and Treatment Basin, a stormwater management facility serving southeast Oakland County.

== Notable people ==
- Terrence Berg, federal judge
- Monte Geralds, Michigan legislator
- George Steele, wrestler
- Robert Wyland, muralist
