= Howell Public Schools =

School district in Michigan, United States

Address
- 411 N. Highlander Way Howell, Livingston, Michigan, 48843; United States

District information
- Grades: PreK–12
- Superintendent: Erin J. MacGregor, Ed.D.
- Budget: $103,133,000 2022-2023 expenditures
- NCES District ID: 2618720

Students and staff
- Enrollment: 7,045 (2024-2025)
- Teachers: 397.92 FTE (2024-2025)
- Staff: 765.12 FTE (2024-2025)
- Student–teacher ratio: 17.7 (2024-2025)

Other information
- Website: www.howellschools.com

Howell Public Schools is a school district in Livingston County, Michigan. It serves the city of Howell and parts of the following townships: Cohoctah, Deerfield, Genoa, Handy, Howell, Iosco, Marion, Oceola, and Putnam.

== History ==
Michigan Avenue Middle School, built in 1921, was located at 325 S Michigan Ave (where the post office is currently). It was once known as Howell Public School and included the high school. It was demolished in 1983.

The Freshman Campus was built as Howell High School in 1965. Michigan Avenue Middle School moved into the building, at 1400 West Grand River Avenue, when the present Howell High School was built, renaming it McPherson Middle School.

The present Howell High School opened in September 1981. McPherson Middle School became the Freshman Campus with the opening of its replacement, Three Fires Middle School (now Three Fires Elementary) in 2002.

Parker Middle School had been planned as a high school, and when it opened in 2007, it housed Howell High School while that building underwent renovations. After the 2007-2008 school year, other than housing some classes for Lansing Community College in one section, it was vacant due to lack of funds. In fall 2008, the movie High School with Adrien Brody used it as a filming location. In fall 2011, Three Fires Middle School moved into the Parker building, and it was renamed Parker Middle School. At that time, Latson Road Elementary closed and moved to Three Fires Middle School, becoming Three Fires Elementary.

== Schools ==
Schools in Howell Public Schools District
School	Address	Notes
Challenger Elementary	1066 W. Grand River Ave, Howell	Grades K–5
Hutchings Elementary	3503 Bigelow Rd, Howell	Grades K-5
Northwest Elementary	1233 Bower St, Howell	Grades K-5
Southwest Elementary	915 Gay Rd, Howell	Grades K-5
Three Fires Elementary	4125 Crooked Lake Rd, Howell	Grades K-5. Built 2002.
Voyager Elementary	1450 Byron Rd, Howell	Grades K-5
Highlander Way Middle School	511 Highlander Way, Howell	Grades 6–8
Parker Middle School	400 Wright Rd, Howell	Grades 6-8. Built 2007.
Howell High Freshman Campus	1400 W. Grand River Ave, Howell	Houses 9th grade students. Built 1965.
Howell High School	1200 W. Grand River Ave, Howell	Grades 10-12. Built 1981.
Little Highlander's Learning Center	861 E. Sibley St, Howell	Formerly Southwest Elementary. Shares a building with Innovation Academy.
Innovation Academy	861 E. Sibley St, Howell	Alternative high school, grades 9-12
John W Academy of Learning	861 E. Sibley St, Howell	Alternative highschool, grade 12
