= Fowlerville Community Schools =

School district in Michigan

Address
- 7677 W. Sharpe Rd. Suite A Fowlerville, Livingston, Michigan, 48836; United States

District information
- Grades: Pre-Kindergarten-12
- Superintendent: Matt Stuard
- Schools: 5
- Budget: $45,418,000 2022-2023 expenditures
- NCES District ID: 2614730

Students and staff
- Students: 2,410 (2024-2025)
- Teachers: 156.01 (on an FTE basis) (2024-2025)
- Staff: 343.72 FTE (2024-2025)
- Student–teacher ratio: 15.45 (2024-2025)

Other information
- Website: www.fowlervilleschools.org

Fowlerville Community Schools is a public school district in Livingston County, Michigan. It serves Fowlerville and parts of the townships of Cohoctah, Conway, Handy, Howell, Iosco, and Unadilla. It also serves parts of Locke Township and White Oak Township in Ingham County and parts of Antrim Township in Shiawassee County.

All schools in the district share a campus on the east side of North Grand Street just north of the village of Fowlerville.

== History ==
The first schools within the present district's boundaries were started in 1837. According to the district's history as written in the 1976 Fowlerville High School Yearbook, "A log cabin with a plank floor and a large stone fireplace was typical of the early breed. Seats were made of split logs on legs, and the desks were simply wooden planks fastened to the walls."

By 1879, there were 725 schoolchildren in Handy Township, including Fowlerville, and seven frame one-room schoolhouses, with the eighth school in the village being two stories. A high school that went to only grade ten was established in 1883. A dedicated high school was built in 1891, and by 1893 it went to grade twelve. Students from primary school districts in outlying townships could attend the high school for tuition, and typically commuted on horseback.

The two-story village elementary, which had been built in 1871, burned in a suspicious fire in 1921. Lansing architect and Fowlerville alumnus Warren S. Holmes designed its replacement, which opened in 1923, to hold all grades.

Two more elementary schools were built prior to the district's consolidation with the outlying rural school districts in April of 1953. In 1956, a new high school was built on the current school campus and the 1923 building became a middle school.

In fall 1982, John S. Munn Middle School and Fowlerville High School were dedicated. Munn Middle School was converted from the former high school.

Natalie Kreeger Elementary opened in fall 1992.

In fall 1999, the former Fowlerville Junior High School opened. It was designed by TMP Architecture to be eventually converted to the high school. This occurred around 2006, with extensive additions and renovations, including an 800-seat auditorium. The 1982 high school became a junior high.

As part of a construction bond issue passed in 2021, H.T. Smith Elementary was replaced with Fowlerville Elementary, which opened in January 2025. The former H.T. Smith Elementary was converted to Little Glad Early Childhood Center, which had formerly occupied the Munn Middle School building. The former Munn Middle School will be demolished.

== Schools ==
Schools in Fowlerville Community Schools District
School	Address	Notes
Fowlerville High School	700 N. Grand Ave., Fowlerville	Grades 9-12. Built 1999, high school additions built 2006-2007.
Fowlerville Junior High School	7677 Sharpe Rd., Fowlerville	Grades 6-8. Built 1982.
Fowlerville Elementary	420 N. Hibbard St., Fowlerville	Grades K-2. Opened 2025.
Natalie Kreeger Elementary	430 N. Hibbard, Fowlerville	Grades 3-5. Built 1992.
Little Glad Early Childhood Center	450 N. Hibbard St, Fowlerville	Preschool and child care
Fowlerville Online Learning Academy	700 N. Grand Ave. Room E-113, Fowlerville	Online education program
