= Michigan Challenge Balloonfest =

- Genre: Hot air balloon festival
- Frequency: Annually, last weekend of June
- Location: Howell, Michigan
- Coordinates: 42°36′35″N 83°55′58″W
- Country: United States
- Years active: 40–41
- Inaugurated: 1985
- Website: www.michiganchallenge.com

The Michigan Challenge Balloonfest is an annual hot air balloon festival established in 1985 and held in Howell, Michigan during the last weekend of June. The event draws crowds from all over Michigan and its surrounding states, with attendance often topping 100,000 over the three-day weekend. The festival is hosted by the Howell Area Chamber of Commerce, takes place at Howell High School, and is run by head of the Howell Area Chamber of Commerce, Janelle Best, as well as balloonmeister and competition director, Phil Clinger.

The 36th annual Michigan Challenge Balloonfest was postponed in 2020 due to the COVID-19 pandemic, and instead took place in 2021.

== Annual attractions ==
The festival starts each year on Friday afternoon with the opening of the carnival. Being right on Grand River, the lights make a spectacle for anyone driving through the downtown area every night. Friday night also features a fireworks display, as of the 2009 festival, sponsored by MediLodge of Howell. The Arts Festival held next to the Howell High School main campus goes on for the entire weekend and attracts vendors selling anything from crafts to hand-painted artwork. Saturday morning the day starts early with the balloon fly-in. In downtown Howell, the St. Joseph Mercy Hospital kids day, held on the lawn of the historical Howell Courthouse, features demonstrations such as karate and dancing. The balloon night glow, has been one of the favorite events of the festival since its introduction to the weekend in 1993, and is held late on Saturday night each year. After the evening launch, the pilots all come back to the launch field and re-inflate their balloons, then led by a countdown, they all light their burners together, and the crowd is treated to all the balloons glowing together on the field.

== Annual launches ==
There are several mass balloon launches scheduled each year. Each flight is weather dependent on many factors, such as rain and wind. On Friday night, the balloons all launch from the Howell High School Freshman Campus main launch field. On both Saturday and Sunday morning, pilots will partake in multiple competitions, most of the time involving flying into the main field and attempting to drop a marker (bean bag with a ripstop nylon tail) onto one or multiple large targets that have been placed where pilots would normally take off from, as well as other locations around the city. Saturday evening holds another mass launch, followed by the famous Balloon Glow, where 20-25 pilots return to the launchfield to light up their balloons in the evening's darkness to the delight of the crowd. Sunday evening holds a farewell mass launch to close the event.

== Sponsors ==
To date, the event is sponsored by Advanced Disposal, Citizens Insurance, and Howell Public Schools. MediLodge of Howell annually sponsors the fireworks display, while PepsiCo is the major beverage sponsor of the event, and Suburban Propane is the official propane sponsor. Past title sponsors have included PNC Bank, Father & Son Construction, and Cleary University.
