= Fowlerville, Michigan =

- Village
- Village of Fowlerville
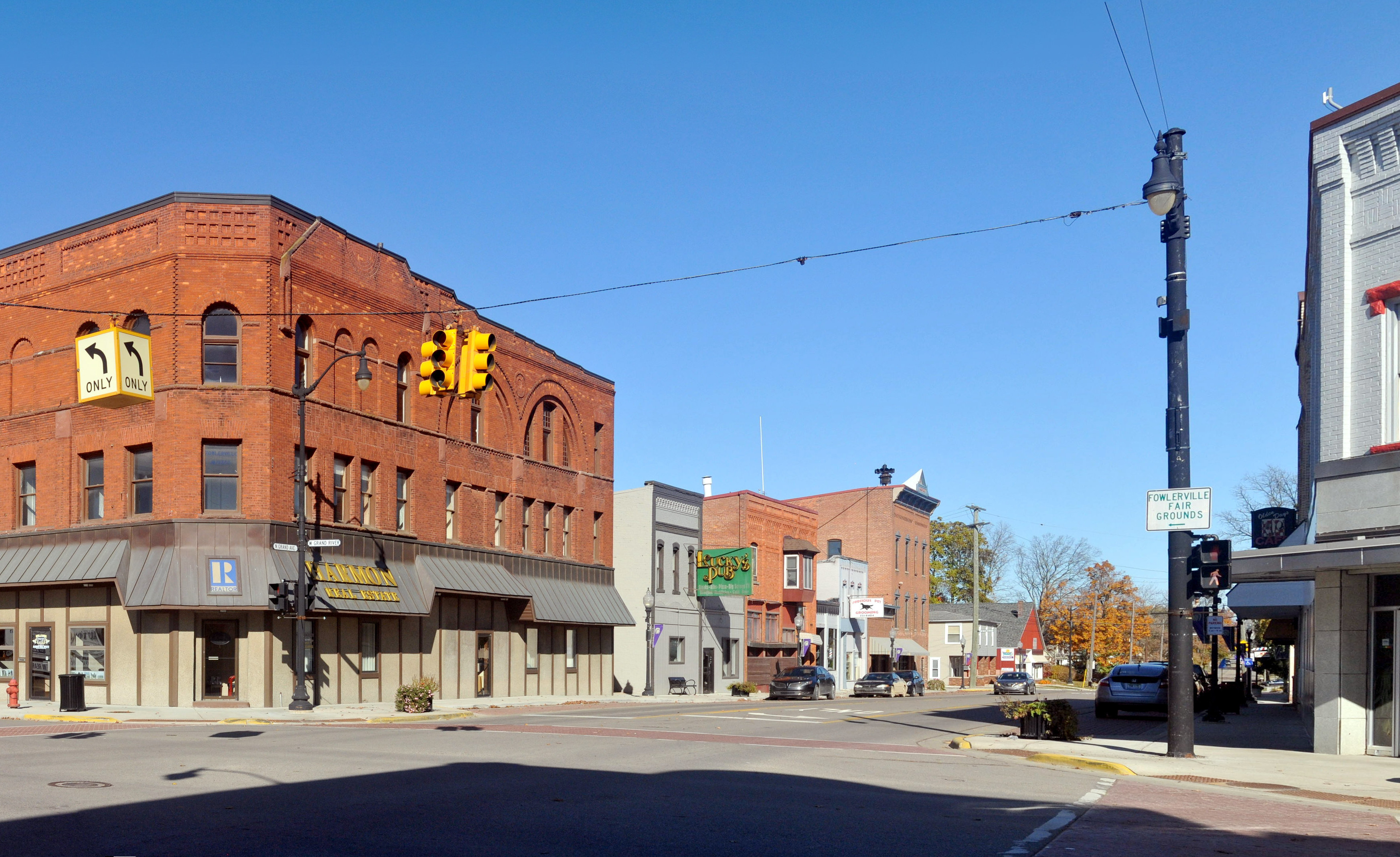
- Downtown Fowlerville along Grand Avenue

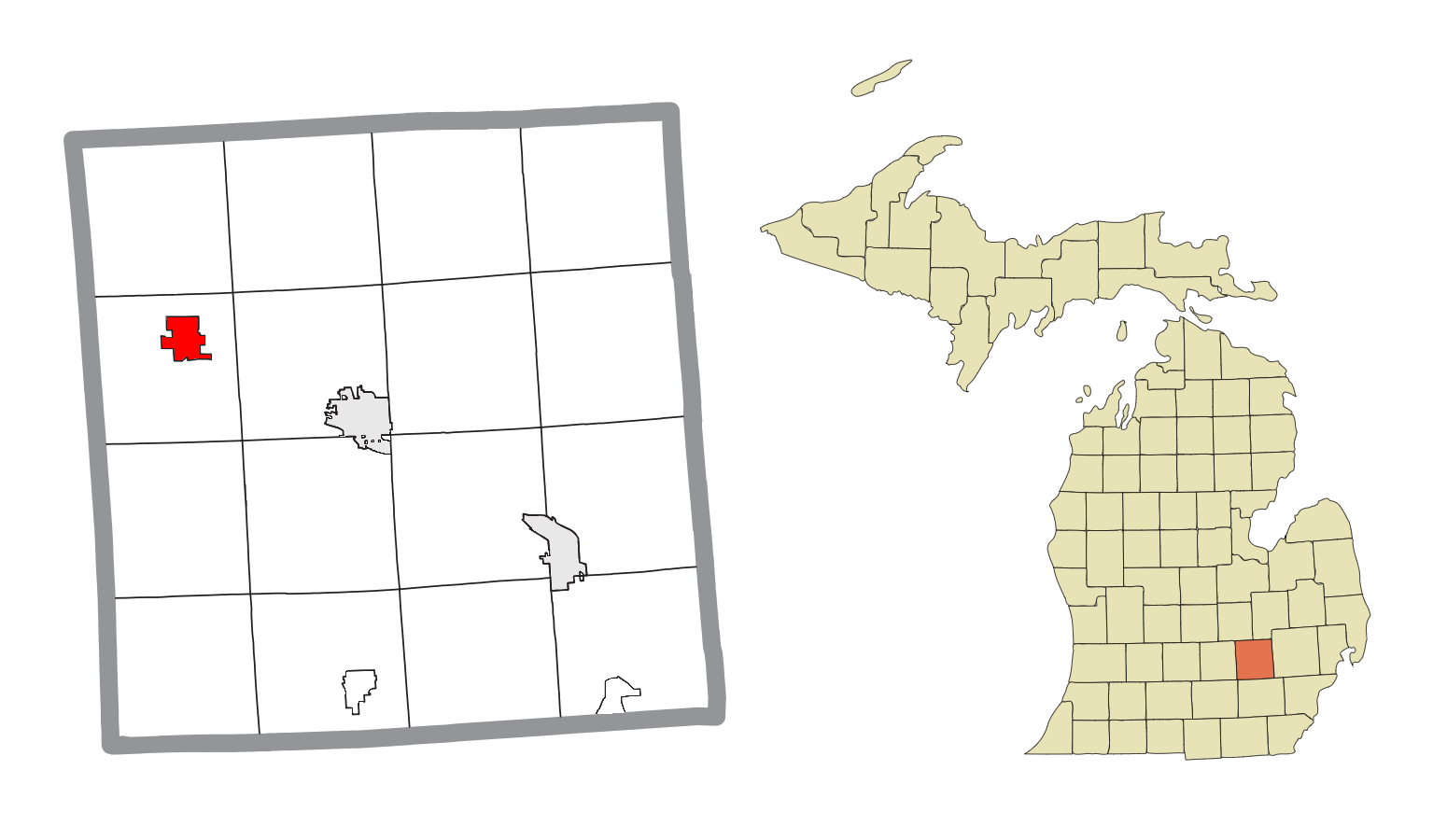
- Location within Livingston County

- Location within the state of Michigan
- Coordinates: 42°39′38″N 84°04′23″W
- Country: United States
- State: Michigan
- County: Livingston
- Township: Handy
- Settled: 1836
- Platted: 1849
- Incorporated: 1871

Government
  - Type: Village council
  - Manager: Kathryn Rajala-Gutzki
  - Clerk: Kathryn Rajala-Gutzki
  - Treasurer: Michelle Lamb

Area
  - Village: 2.35 sq mi (6.08 km^{2})
  - Land: 2.31 sq mi (5.98 km^{2})
  - Water: 0.035 sq mi (0.09 km^{2})
- Elevation: 902 ft (275 m)

Population (2020)
  - Village: 2,951
  - Density: 1,277.3/sq mi (493.16/km^{2})
  - Metro: 4,296,250 (Metro Detroit)
- Time zone: UTC-5 (Eastern (EST))
  - Summer (DST): UTC-4 (EDT)
- ZIP code(s): 48836
- Area code: 517
- FIPS code: 26-30060
- GNIS feature ID: 0626363
- Website: www.fowlerville.org

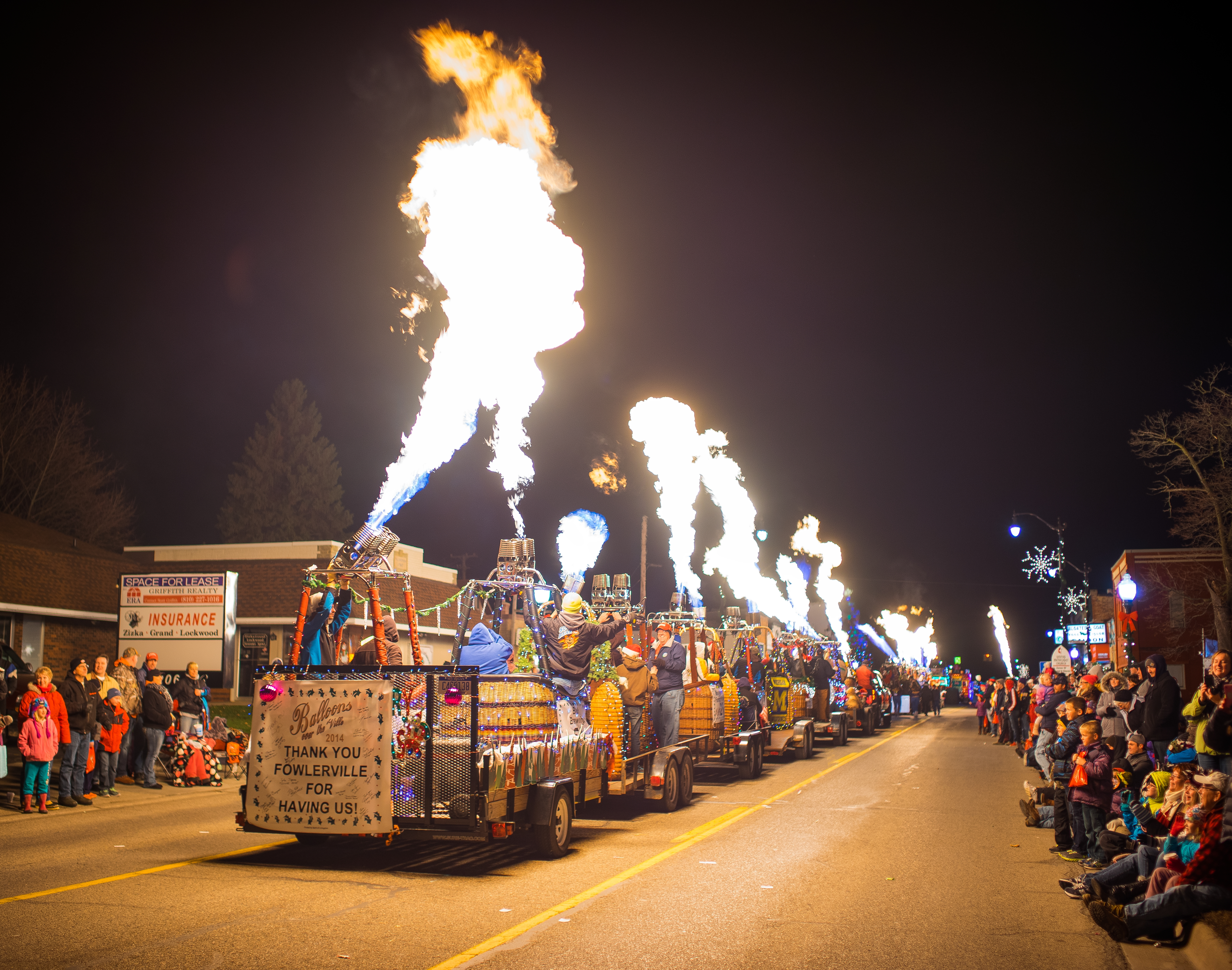
Fire Train

Fowlerville is a village in Livingston County in the U.S. state of Michigan. It is located in the northeast portion of Handy Township. The population was 2,951 at the time of the 2020 census.

== History ==
The first permanent settler was Ralph Fowler in 1836, who also instructed Amos Adams to plat the village in 1849. A post office named "Cedar" was established in 1838, but was renamed "Fowlerville" in 1853, after the village's plat name. The village incorporated in 1871. In 1909, a tornado swept through the town and hit St. Agnes Catholic Church.

The village is the site of the Livingston County Fair Grounds, where various large events are held annually. There are also annual festivities in the town during the year celebrating different national holiday such as Christmas, Fourth of July, and Memorial Day.

The Fowlerville Chronicles, self-published in 2010 by Marion Cornett, follows the history of Fowlerville from the arrival of Ralph Fowler in 1836 through 2010. There are nearly 600 pictures, maps, aerials, and sketches. A copy of the book can be found on The Fowlerville Observer, a website dedicated to reporting the history of the village as well as modern-day events. Another feature on the website are "squint shots", in which a picture is shown each day of something in and/or around the village of Fowlerville.

On November 9, 2024 Nazis demonstrated in downtown Fowlerville.

== Geography ==
According to the United States Census Bureau, the village has a total area of 2.38 square miles (6.16 km^{2}), of which 2.34 square miles (6.06 km^{2}) is land and 0.04 square miles (0.10 km^{2}) is water.

== Demographics ==
Historical population
Census	Pop.	Note	%±
1880	1,051		—
1900	946		—
1910	905		−4.3%
1920	1,057		16.8%
1930	1,141		7.9%
1940	1,118		−2.0%
1950	1,466		31.1%
1960	1,674		14.2%
1970	1,978		18.2%
1980	2,289		15.7%
1990	2,648		15.7%
2000	2,972		12.2%
2010	2,886		−2.9%
2020	2,951		2.3%
U.S. Decennial Census

=== 2020 census ===
As of the 2020 census, Fowlerville had a population of 2,951. The median age was 36.9 years. 23.8% of residents were under the age of 18 and 15.9% of residents were 65 years of age or older. For every 100 females there were 93.4 males, and for every 100 females age 18 and over there were 92.3 males age 18 and over.

0.0% of residents lived in urban areas, while 100.0% lived in rural areas.

There were 1,262 households in Fowlerville, of which 31.1% had children under the age of 18 living in them. Of all households, 37.0% were married-couple households, 21.1% were households with a male householder and no spouse or partner present, and 30.6% were households with a female householder and no spouse or partner present. About 32.1% of all households were made up of individuals and 14.6% had someone living alone who was 65 years of age or older.

There were 1,334 housing units, of which 5.4% were vacant. The homeowner vacancy rate was 1.2% and the rental vacancy rate was 5.2%.

Racial composition as of the 2020 census
Race	Number	Percent
White	2,655	90.0%
Black or African American	9	0.3%
American Indian and Alaska Native	24	0.8%
Asian	11	0.4%
Native Hawaiian and Other Pacific Islander	3	0.1%
Some other race	39	1.3%
Two or more races	210	7.1%
Hispanic or Latino (of any race)	128	4.3%

=== 2010 census ===
As of the census of 2010, there were 2,886 people, 1,198 households, and 744 families residing in the village. The population density was 1,233.3 inhabitants per square mile (476.2/km^{2}). There were 1,313 housing units at an average density of 561.1 per square mile (216.6/km^{2}). The racial makeup of the village was 96.8% White, 0.2% African American, 0.6% Native American, 0.3% Asian, 0.4% from other races, and 1.7% from two or more races. Hispanic or Latino of any race were 2.3% of the population.

There were 1,198 households, of which 36.5% had children under the age of 18 living with them, 39.1% were married couples living together, 16.9% had a female householder with no husband present, 6.1% had a male householder with no wife present, and 37.9% were non-families. 31.1% of all households were made up of individuals, and 12.2% had someone living alone who was 65 years of age or older. The average household size was 2.40 and the average family size was 2.97.

The median age in the village was 35.2 years. 26.9% of residents were under the age of 18; 8.8% were between the ages of 18 and 24; 26.9% were from 25 to 44; 24% were from 45 to 64; and 13.4% were 65 years of age or older. The gender makeup of the village was 48.2% male and 51.8% female.

=== 2000 census ===
As of the census of 2000, there were 2,972 people, 1,156 households, and 754 families residing in the village. The population density was 1,285.2 inhabitants per square mile (496.2/km^{2}). There were 1,211 housing units at an average density of 523.7 per square mile (202.2/km^{2}). The racial makeup of the village was 96.30% White, 0.17% African American, 1.35% Native American, 0.30% Asian, 0.03% Pacific Islander, 0.37% from other races, and 1.48% from two or more races. Hispanic or Latino of any race were 1.68% of the population.

There were 1,156 households, out of which 36.2% had children under the age of 18 living with them, 44.4% were married couples living together, 15.6% had a female householder with no husband present, and 34.7% were non-families. 28.3% of all households were made up of individuals, and 12.9% had someone living alone who was 65 years of age or older. The average household size was 2.56 and the average family size was 3.14.

In the village, the population was spread out, with 29.7% under the age of 18, 9.4% from 18 to 24, 31.9% from 25 to 44, 16.5% from 45 to 64, and 12.6% who were 65 years of age or older. The median age was 32 years. For every 100 females, there were 91.4 males. For every 100 females age 18 and over, there were 88.3 males.

The median income for a household in the village was $41,628, and the median income for a family was $44,459. Males had a median income of $40,625 versus $27,406 for females. The per capita income for the village was $18,074. About 6.0% of families and 9.0% of the population were below the poverty line, including 9.9% of those under age 18 and 10.6% of those age 65 or over.

== Education ==
Fowlerville Community Schools serve Fowlerville. The mascot for Fowlerville Schools is the Gladiator, with the school colors being Gold and Purple. The school system is composed of four schools. There are two elementary schools: H.T. Smith Elementary, serving grades K-2, and Natalie Kreeger Elementary, serving grades 3–5. Fowlerville Junior High School serves grades 6–8, and Fowlerville High School serves grades 9–12. There are roughly 180–230 students in a graduating class.

== Notable people ==
- Charlie Gehringer (1903–1993), was a baseball Hall of fame player, coach, general manager, and team vice president, most for his time with Detroit Tigers.
- George Noory (born 1950), is a radio talk show host for Coast to Coast AM
- Rashontae Wawrzyniak, Miss Michigan USA 2015

== Gallery ==
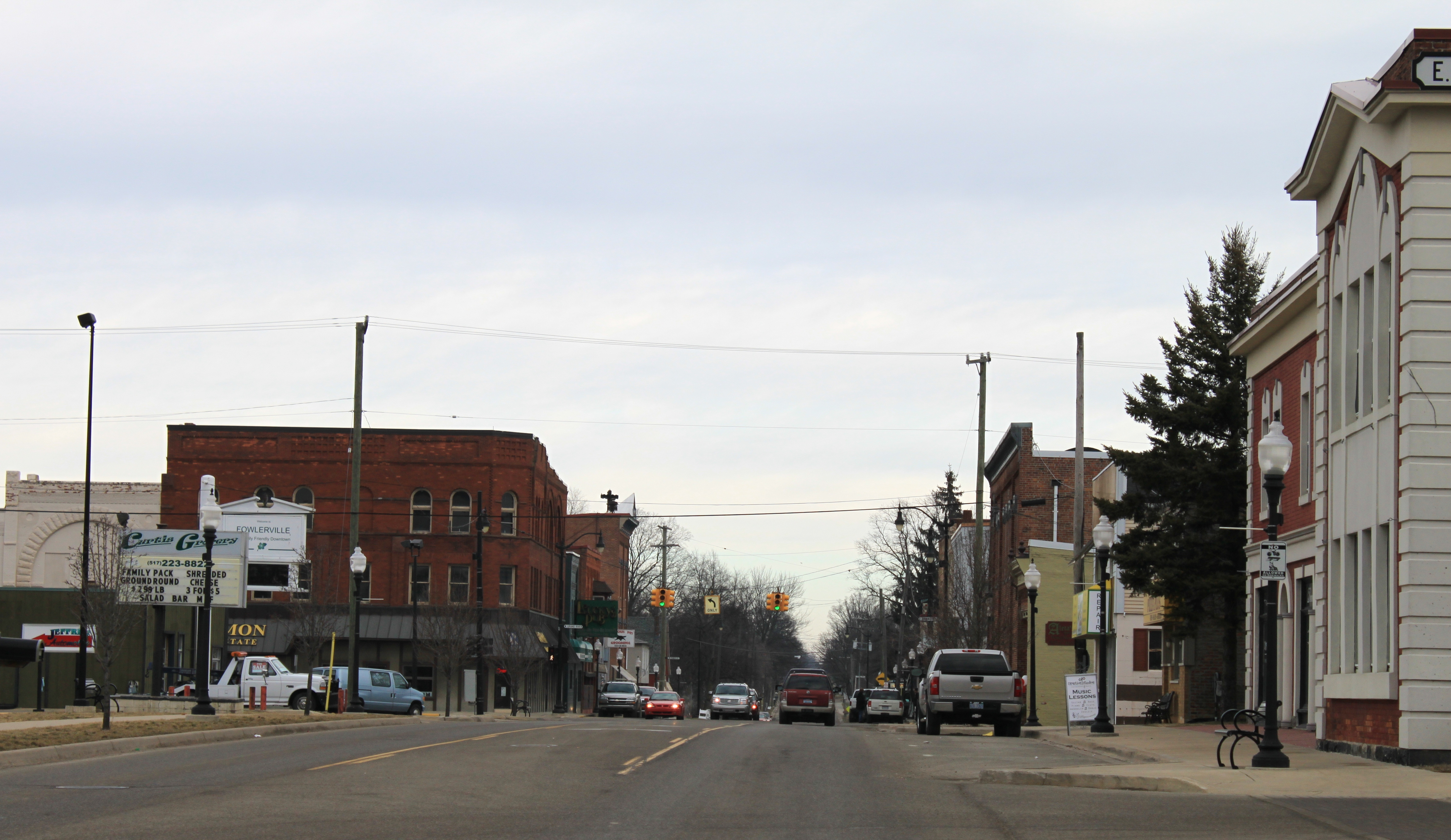
Downtown Fowlerville, Grand Avenue

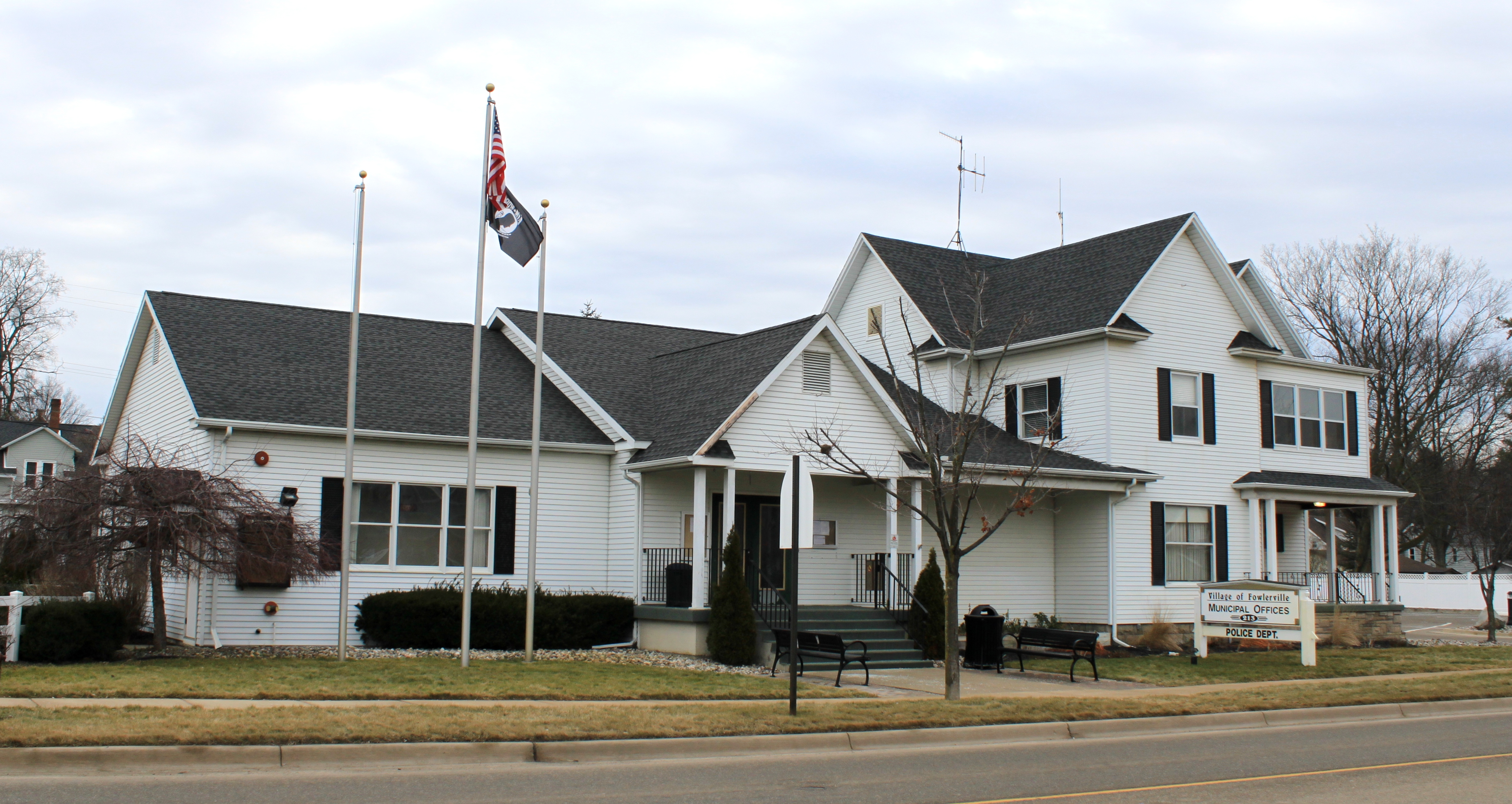
Fowlerville Municipal Offices

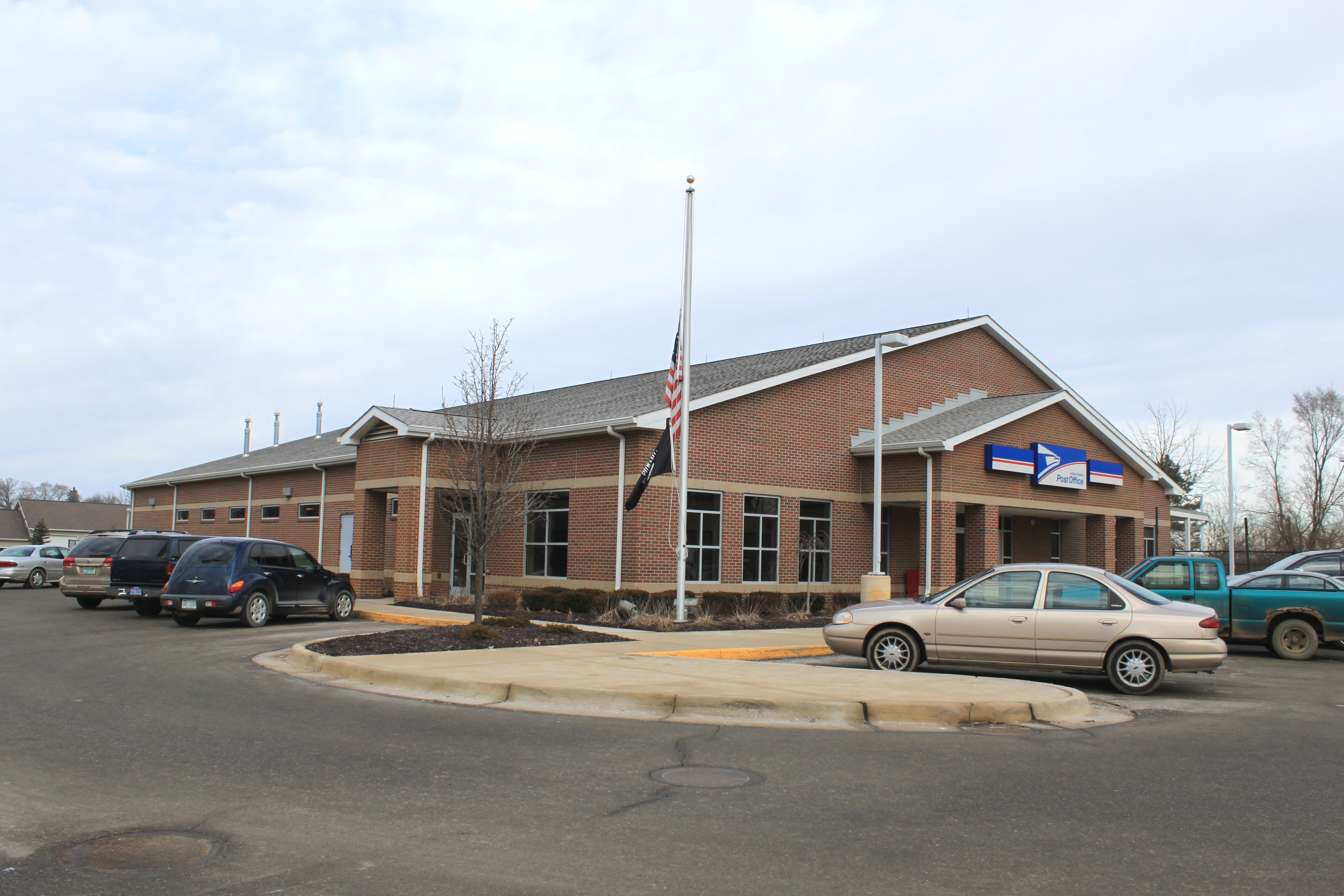
US Post Office

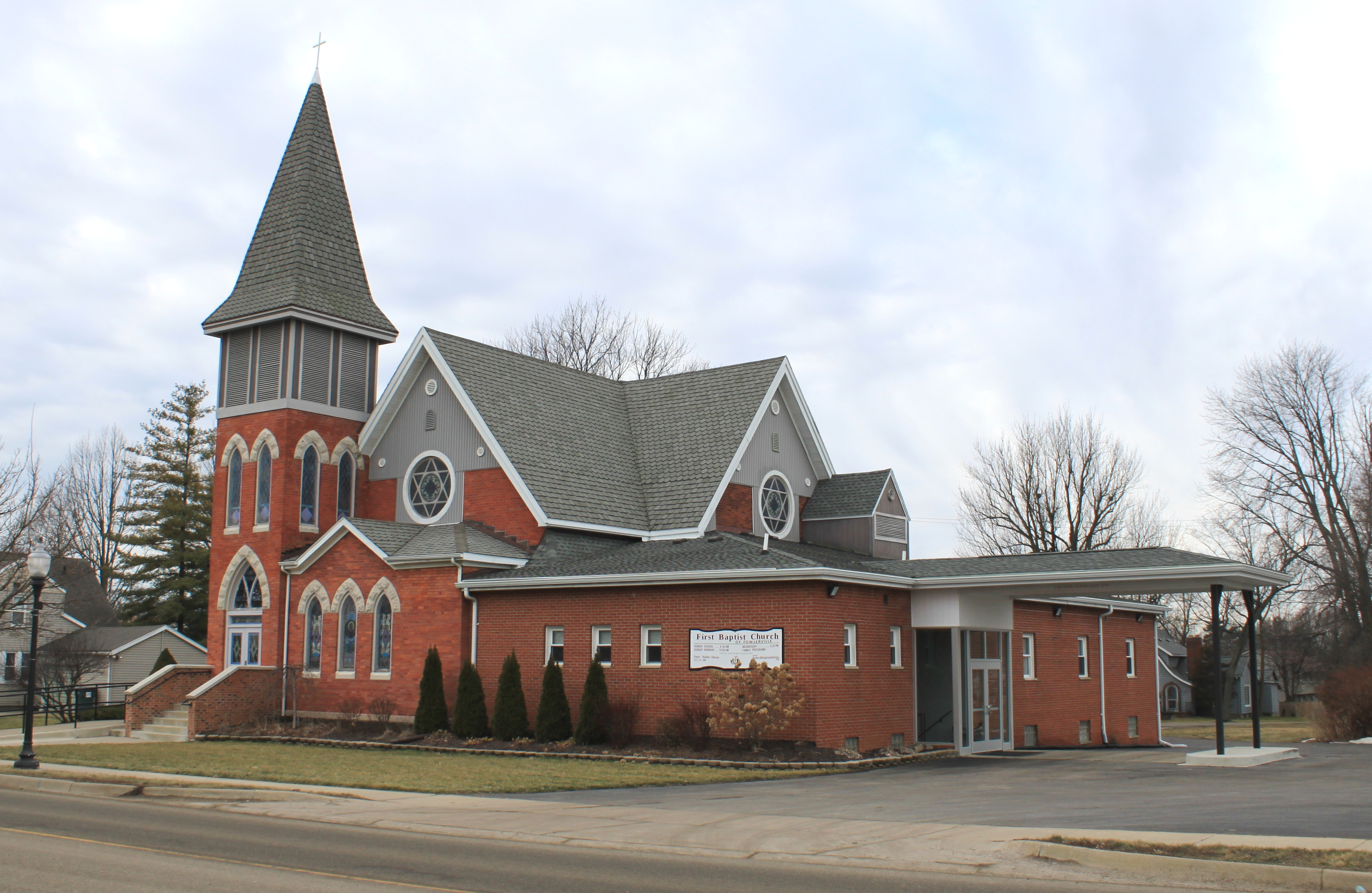
First Baptist Church of Fowlerville

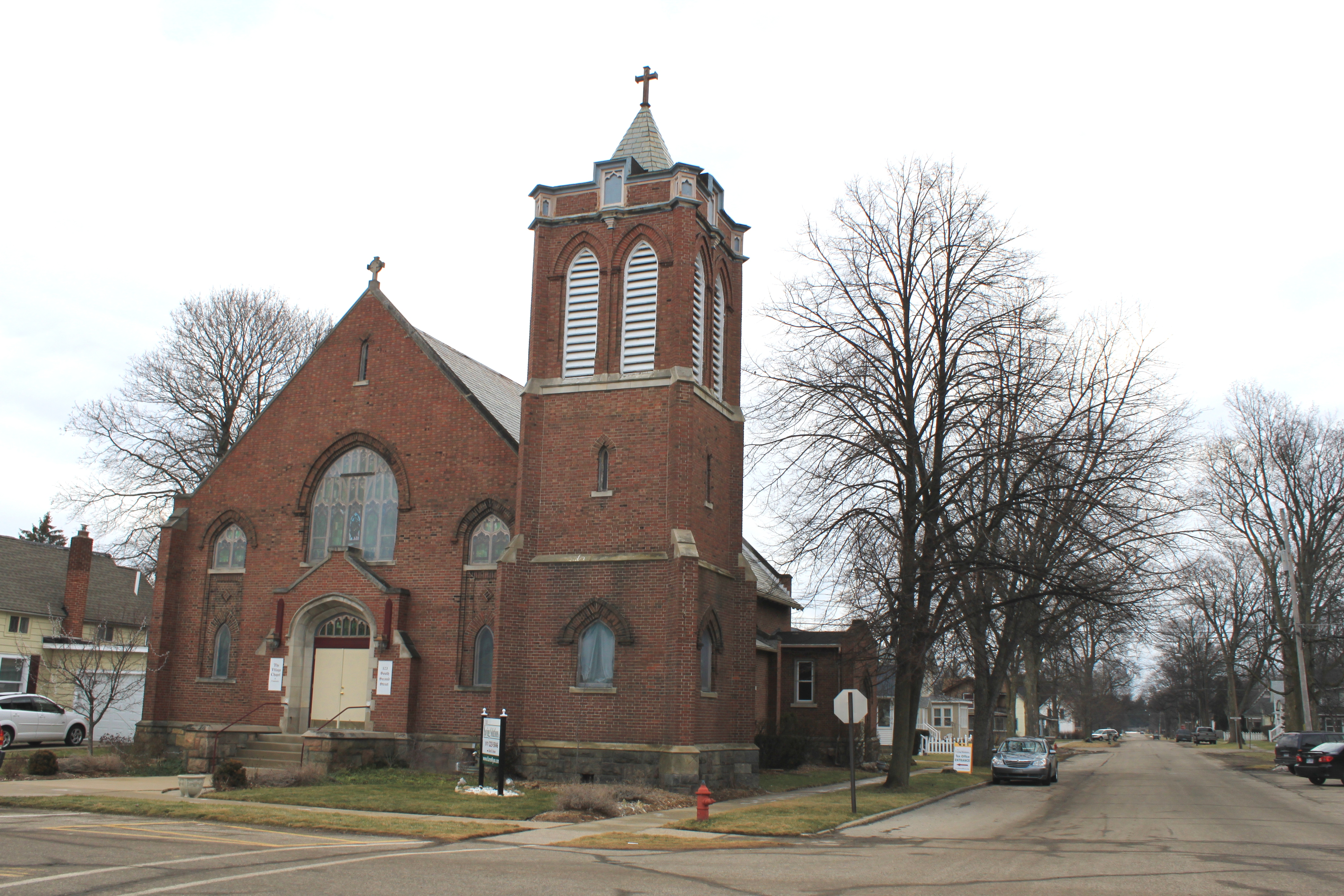
The Village Chapel

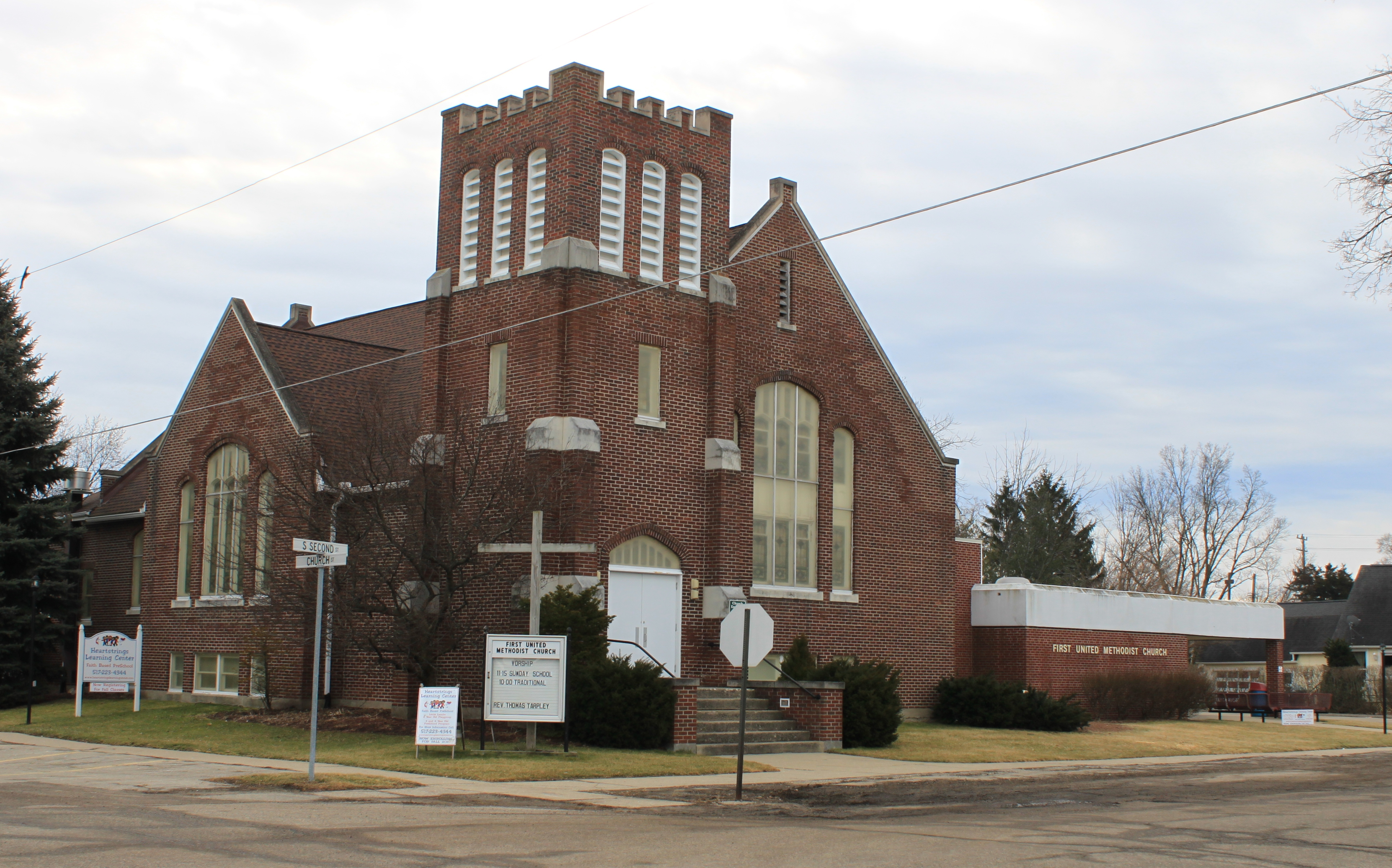
First United Methodist Church

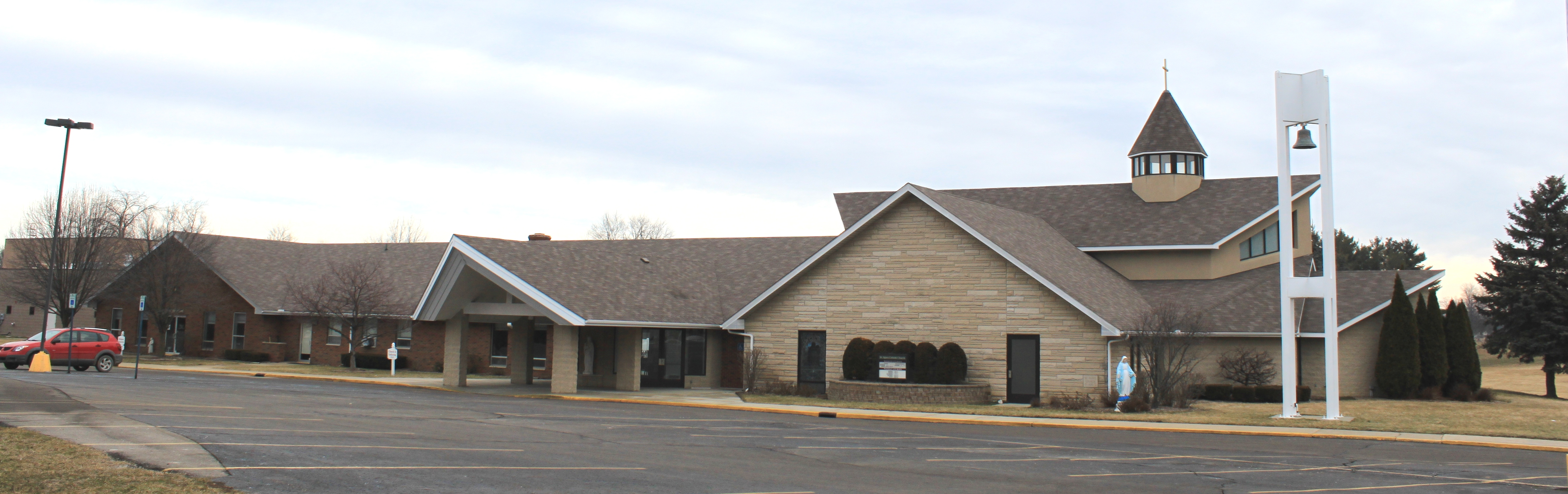
St. Agnes Catholic Church

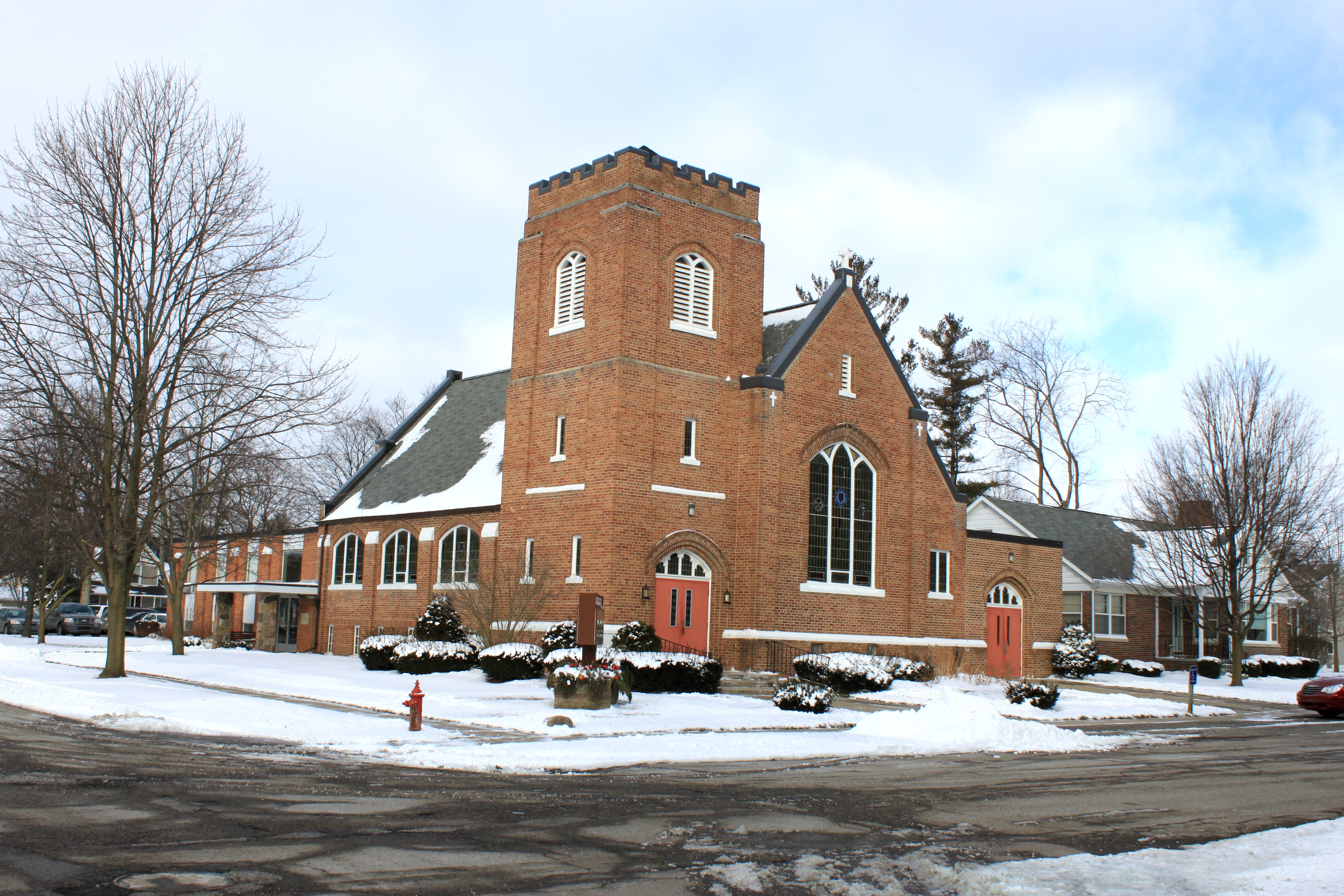
St. John's Lutheran Church
