= Yuki Nomura =

Japanese baseball player (born 2000)

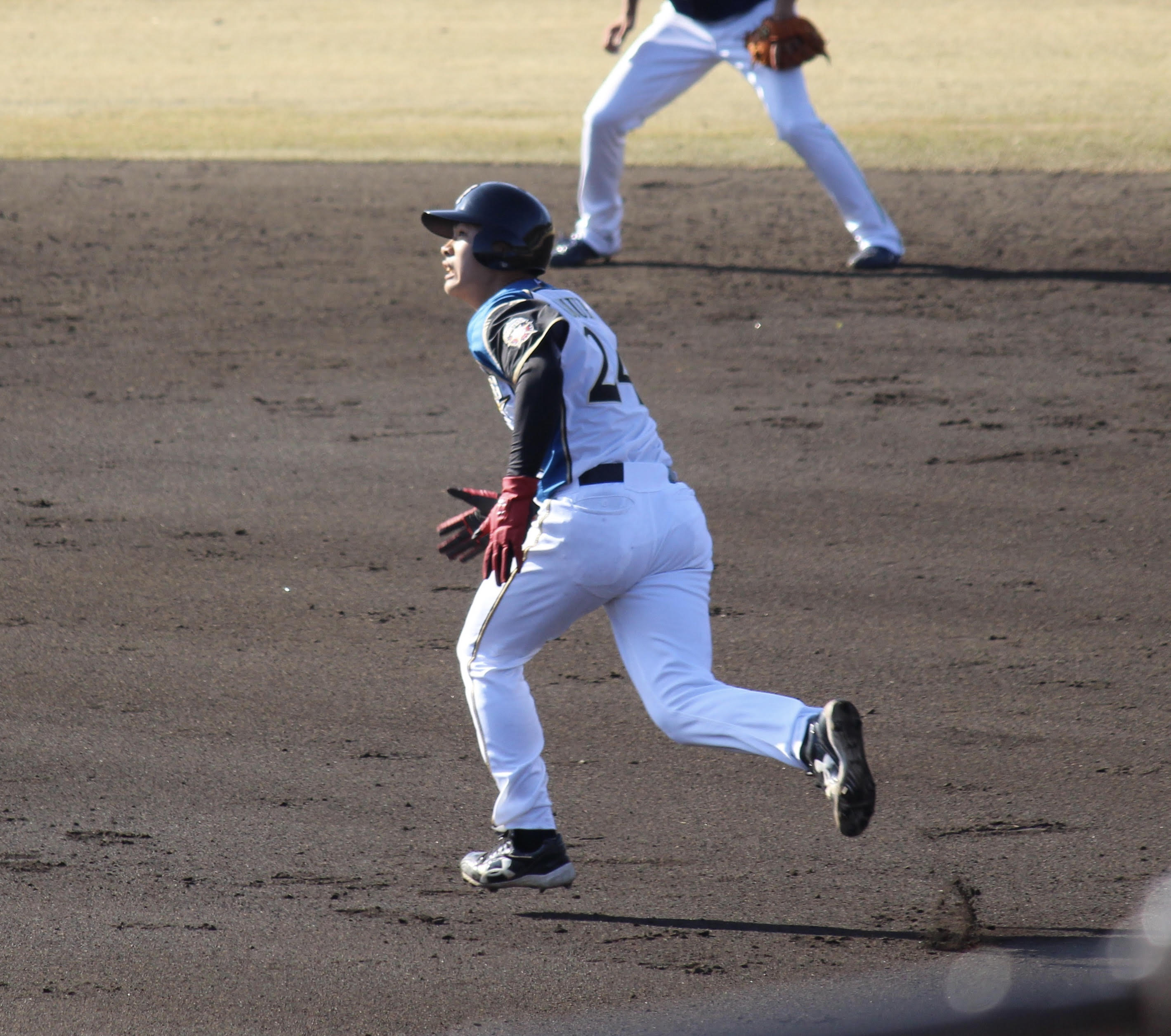

Hokkaido Nippon Ham Fighters – No. 5
- Infielder
- Born: June 26, 2000 (age 25); Howell, Michigan
- Bats: Right Throws: Right

NPB debut
- June 19, 2020, for the Hokkaido Nippon-Ham Fighters

Career statistics (through 2023 season)
- Batting average: .260
- Hits: 315
- Home runs: 29
- Runs batted in: 134
- Stolen bases: 7
- Stats at Baseball Reference

Teams
- Hokkaido Nippon-Ham Fighters (2019–present)

Career highlights and awards
- 1× NPB All-Star (2022)

Yuki "James" Nomura (野村 佑希, Nomura Yuki; born June 26, 2000) is a professional Japanese baseball player. He plays infielder for the Hokkaido Nippon-Ham Fighters.
