= Howell, Michigan =

- City
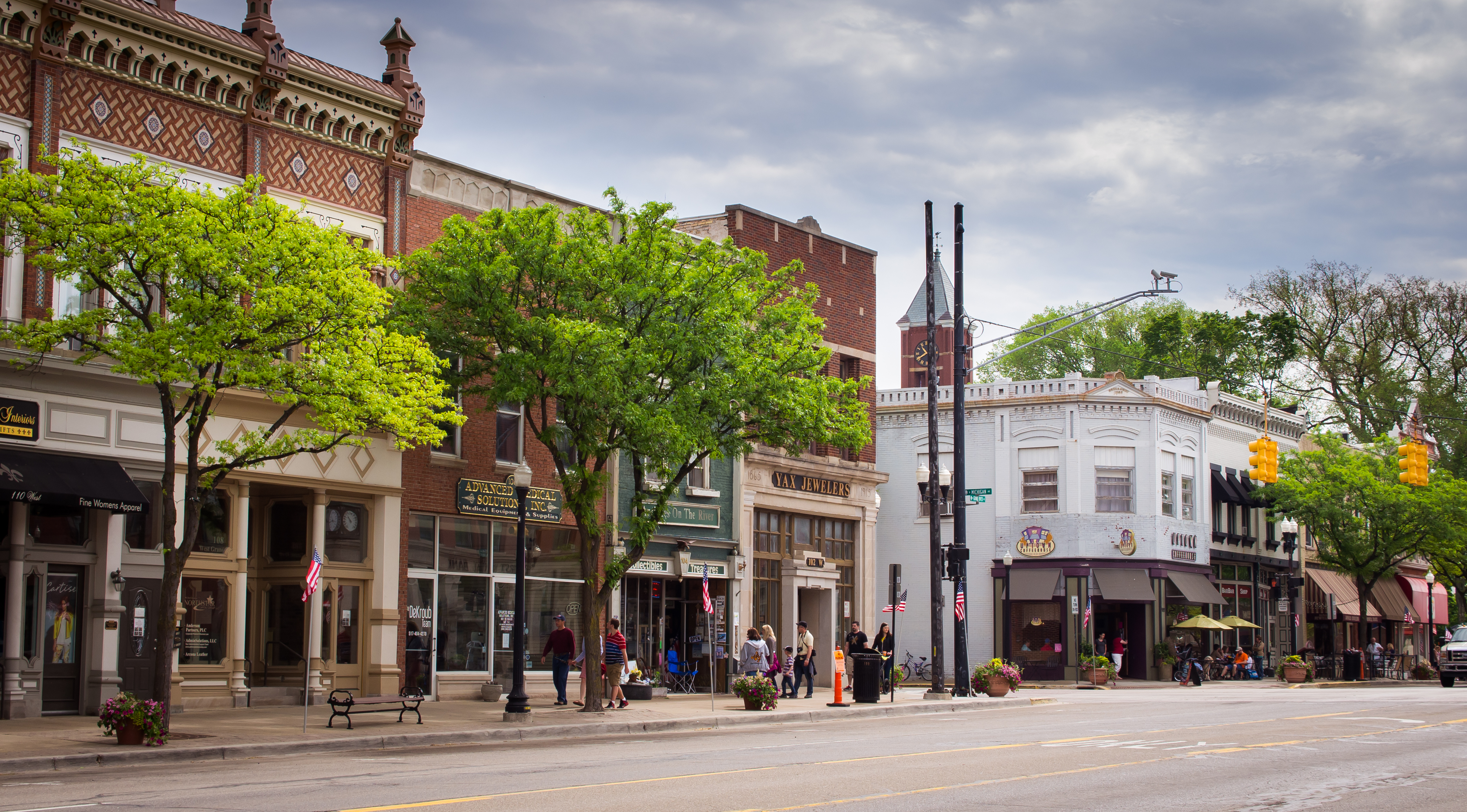
- Facing east along Grand River Avenue (BL I-96)

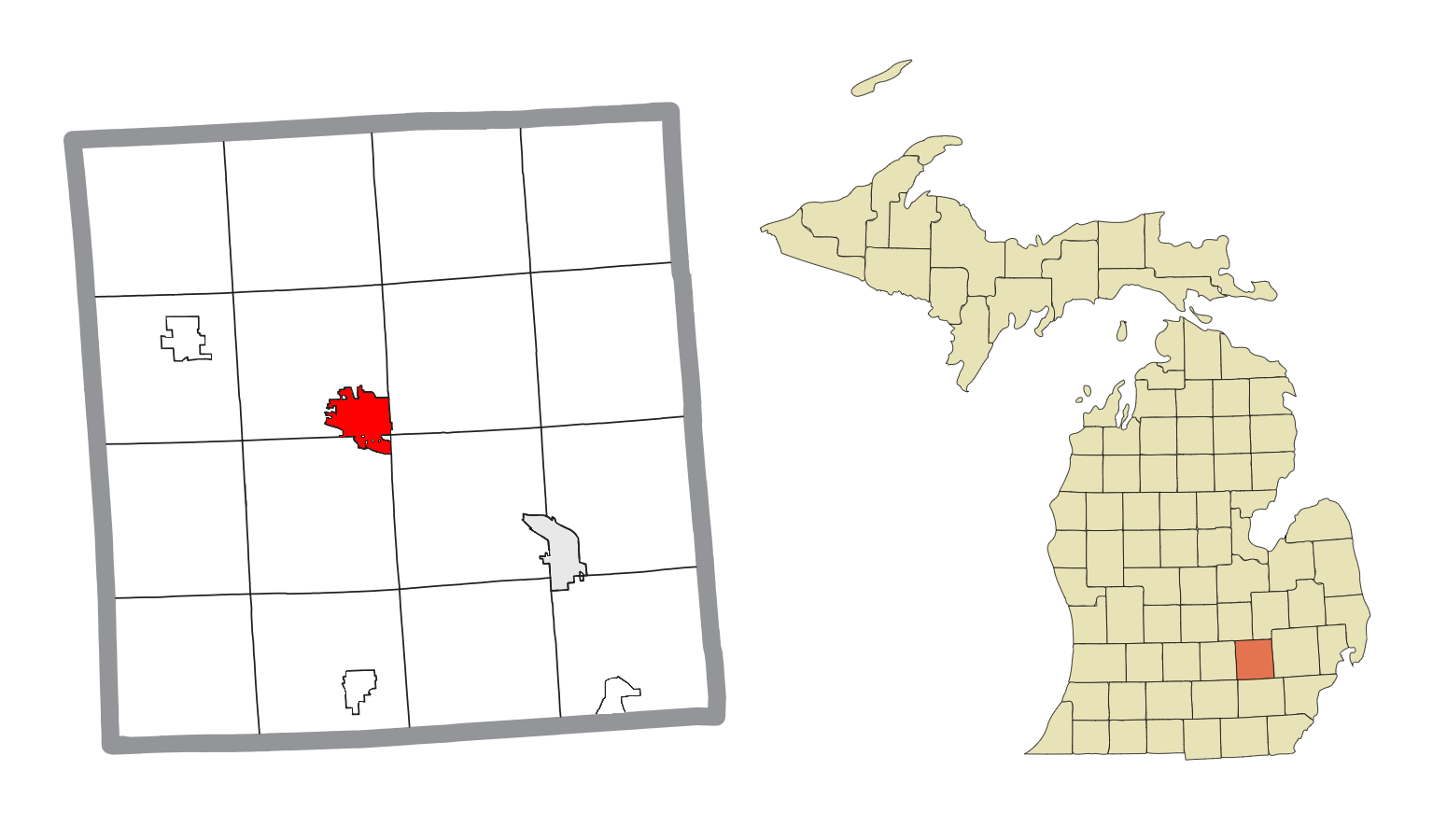
- Location within Livingston County

- Location within the state of Michigan
- Coordinates: 42°36′35″N 83°55′58″W
- Country: United States
- State: Michigan
- County: Livingston
- Platted: 1835
- Incorporated: 1863

Area
  - City: 5.20 sq mi (13.46 km^{2})
  - Land: 4.99 sq mi (12.93 km^{2})
  - Water: 0.20 sq mi (0.53 km^{2})
- Elevation: 935 ft (285 m)

Population (2020)
  - City: 10,068
  - Density: 2,017/sq mi (778.8/km^{2})
  - Metro: 4,296,250 (Metro Detroit)
- Time zone: UTC-5 (Eastern (EST))
  - Summer (DST): UTC-4 (EDT)
- ZIP Codes: 48843, 48844
- Area code: 517
- FIPS code: 26-39540
- GNIS feature ID: 0628717
- Website: www.cityofhowell.org

Howell is the largest city in and the county seat of Livingston County, Michigan, United States. The population was 10,068 at the 2020 census. The city is mostly surrounded by Howell Township, but the two are administered autonomously. Howell is part of the South Lyon–Howell–Brighton urban area, which is an extension of the larger Detroit–Warren–Dearborn (Metro Detroit) metropolitan statistical area. As of 2022, the largest industries were manufacturing, health care & social assistance, and accommodation & food services.

== History ==
The City of Howell is the county seat of Livingston County. On March 24, 1836, the legislature passed an act organizing Livingston County. Howell was slated to become the county seat, but the newly established Brighton nearby claimed the seat for the next 12 years.

=== 19th century ===
January 1836 saw the establishment of the first post office in Howell. Flavius J. B. Crane was postmaster, and the post office was in the Eagle Tavern. In March of this same year, there was a mail route started in the village of Kensington that went through Howell until ending in Grand Rapids. The pioneer manufacturing enterprise of Howell was a sawmill built in 1836, soon followed by a blacksmith shop.

The town was originally called Livingston Center, formed as a village by an act of the legislature on March 14, 1863, consisting of sections 35 and 36, and the south half of sections 25 and 26 of Howell Township.

Before and during the Civil War, the city of Howell was a stop on the Underground Railroad. Most notably, the Historic Howell Opera House, located downtown, served as a station on the Underground Railroad. The opera house provided refuge to freedom seekers fleeing slavery in the South, offering them temporary shelter and assistance on their journey to Canada.

Among the slaves fleeing persecution was Abraham Losford, the first Black resident of Howell. Losford fled north from Kentucky with nothing but his clippers, where he had been enslaved and served as a plantation barber. Local residents helped Losford establish a barber shop in downtown Howell, which remained open until his death. Abraham Losford died in 1897 and is buried in Lakeview Cemetery in Howell. His obituary states that quote, "His presence, as well as his open, manly character, was a living reminder of the sin of slavery. Many winters will come and go before the name of 'Old Uncle Abe' is forgotten in the community."

By the 1890s, there were a number of prominent Black families living in Howell, including Losford, his son Ben Losford, the Childers, Charles Straws, Dave Anderson, manager of the Howell City semi-pro baseball team, and George Jewett.

Jewett was a renaissance man and all-American athlete. Born in 1870 in Ann Arbor, Jewett was valedictorian of his 1889 graduating class, captain of his debate, football and baseball teams, and at one time was the fastest sprinter in the Midwest, and was fluent in German, Italian, and French. Jewett played football for the University of Michigan and Northwestern University, being the first person of color to play in the Big Ten Conference. Jewett practiced medicine in Chicago briefly before returning to Michigan and settling near Howell, where he became the Howell High School football coach, the first black coach of a Michigan high school.

Howell's profound friendliness to Black families attracted more to settle in Howell during the late 19th century. Among other notable black residents was Lulu Childers, whose family were also freed slaves from Kentucky. Lulu and her sister, Nancy, were Howell High School valedictorians (1890 and 1893, respectively).

=== 20th century ===
The Howell Home Rule City Charter was adopted in 1955.

With its rural and suburban lifestyle, but proximity to I-96 and the Detroit Metroplex, Howell of the 20th century became home to numerous corporate leaders in manufacturing, financial services, transportation and distribution. The largest employers include Thai Summit America Corp, Citizens Insurance, Livingston Educational Service Agency, St. Joseph Mercy Hospital, Howell Public Schools, Livingston County, Pepsi Bottling Group and Norvares US.

The 1920s saw a national revival of the Ku Klux Klan following the release of the 1915 film The Birth of a Nation. This "second wave" of the Klan expanded its targets to include not only African Americans but also Catholics, Jews, and immigrants.

As a result of Howell's reputation as a destination for former slaves, and for its thriving African American business community, the city was targeted by hate groups, especially the Klan.

It increased across Michigan, Metro Detroit and Livingston County during the American civil rights era. Since the 1970s, the Howell area has had a reputation for being associated with the Klan. White supremacist leader and Michigan Grand Dragon (1971–1979) Robert E. Miles held gatherings on his farm 12 miles north of the city in Cohoctah Township. Miles died in 1992, but the gatherings, including the burning of crosses, continued.

The Livingston Diversity Council, founded in response to a 1988 cross burning on the lawn of a Black family, has been promoting diversity and inclusion in the county. While they are numerous in Metro Detroit, as of 2011, Howell was not listed as an active home to any hate group by the Southern Poverty Law Center.

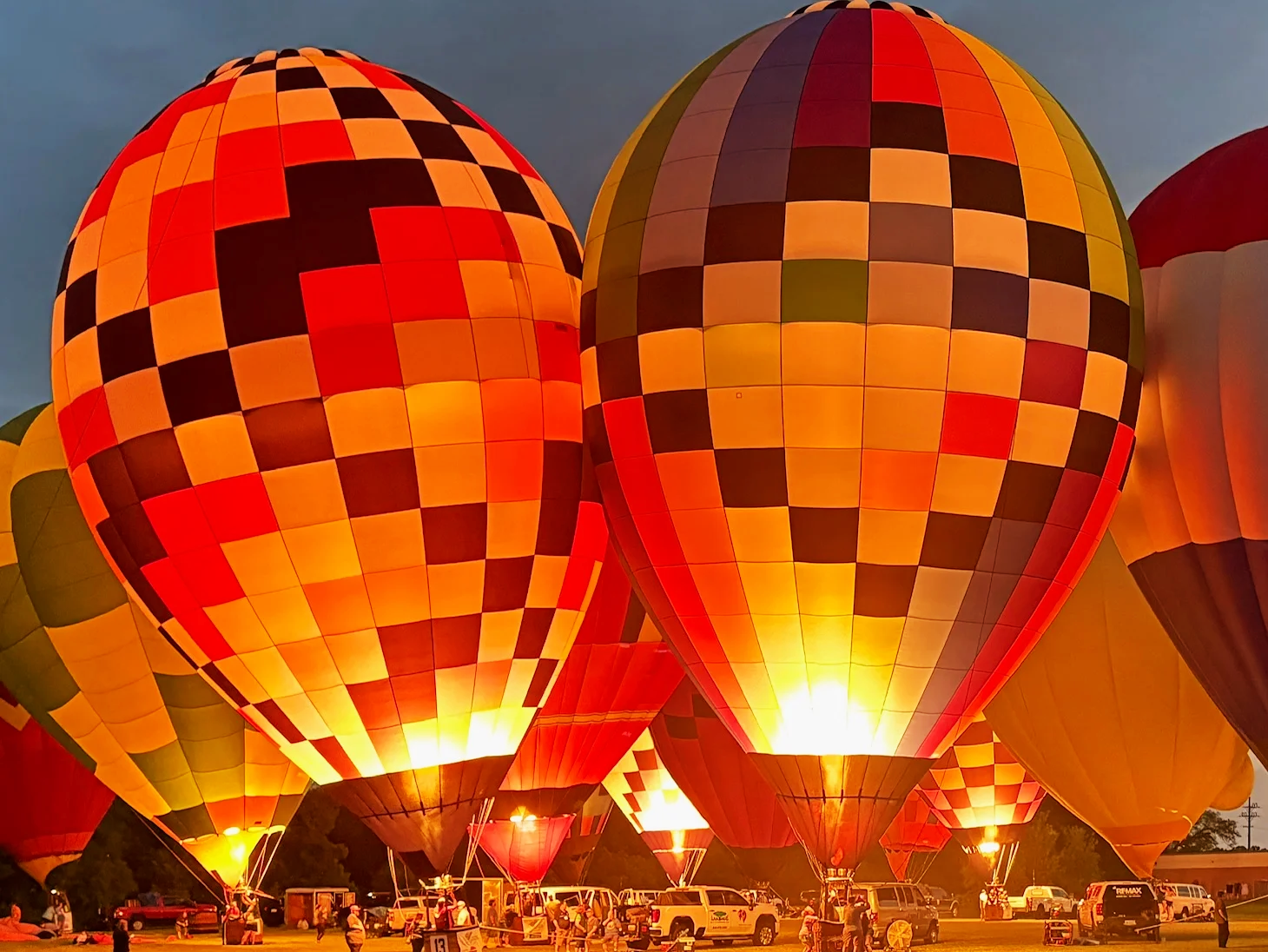
Michigan Challenge Balloonfest - Balloon Glow 2025

Initiated in 1985, Michigan Challenge Balloonfest began as a state championship in hot air ballooning and quickly became a major annual draw for the city and Livingston County. In 1993, Balloonfest introduced the Balloon Glow, which immediately became a fan favorite. On the Friday evening of Balloonfest, hundreds of hot air balloons are unloaded in the field behind Howell High School. The balloons are inflated and the fiery blasts provide a delightful glow at dusk.

On October 22, 1994, less than a dozen Ku Klux Klansmen from outside Howell held a rally on the steps of the historic Livingston County Courthouse. According to a reporter for the Livingston Post, the town may have been chosen because of its reputation for intolerance. Ben Bohnsack, the pastor of the First United Methodist Church in nearby Brighton, Michigan, at the time, described the approaching rally as an "assault on the values" of the community. On the day of the rally, the courthouse was put under the protection of 174 police officers from every law enforcement agency in the county. An 8-foot-tall chain-link fence was erected around the courthouse, with two additional sections raised on Grand River Avenue to contain protesters and observers. The fence was dismantled after the rally, and on the following day, citizens assembled with brooms, mops, and buckets for a symbolic cleansing of the courthouse steps.

=== 21st century ===
Fueled by a distinct community identity and a downtown with numerous, preserved historic buildings, surrounding neighborhoods, and walkable streets create an easily identifiable sense of place, the city of Howell population grew more than 9%, from 9,232 to 10,068 between 2000 and 2020.

Among the city's leading and most notable events include the Michigan Challenge Balloonfest and the Howell Melon Festival, best known as "MelonFest."

Halloween in Howell, continued to be a major celebration, with annual downtown events every October, such as the "Legend of Sleepy Howell" and "Witches Night," both of which draw tens of thousands into the city every year.

A major development in the local education scene, the new Howell High School at the Parker Campus, opened in 2007. It featured modern facilities, including the first school in the country to operate an automated student store, called the "Kilt Shack" and a cybercafe, aimed at upgrading local education.

Activities associated with the Ku Klux Klan persisted into the 2000s, with events such as a public auction of Klan items scheduled for Martin Luther King Jr.'s birthday in January 2005, the 2010 suspension of a teacher who removed students for wearing a Confederate flag and making anti-gay slurs, and students' racist tweets toward a racially mixed team in 2014.

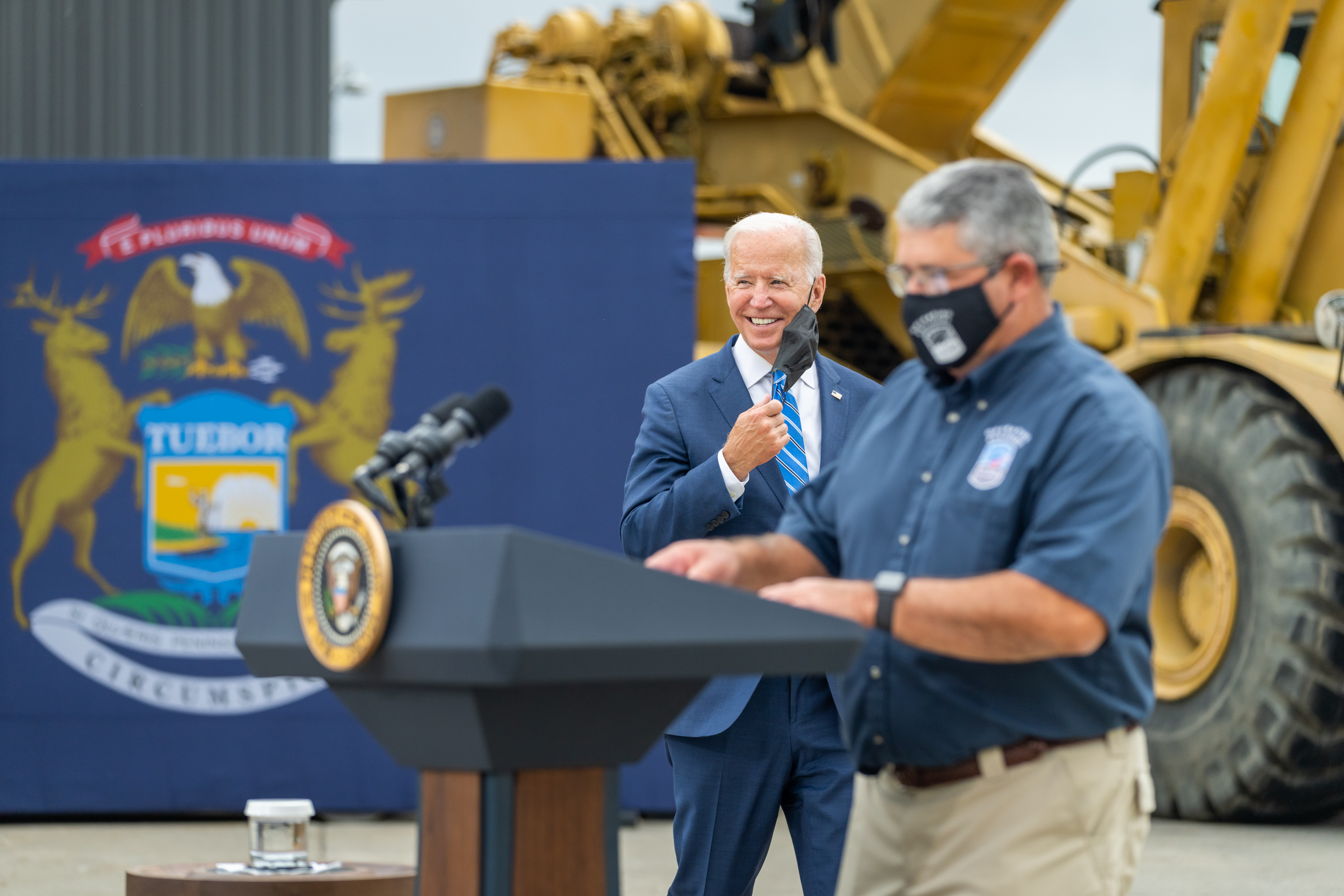
President Joe Biden delivers remarks on his Build Back Better agenda, Tuesday, October 5, 2021, at the Operating Engineers Training Facility in Howell, Michigan.

On October 5, 2021, President Joe Biden visited Howell for a speech to build support for his Build Back Better Plan.

On July 21, 2024, about a dozen masked white supremacists from outside of the city marched through downtown Howell, chanting "Heil Hitler" and carrying signs with messages such as "White Lives Matter" and "End the War on White Children." They began their demonstration on the lawn of the Livingston County courthouse, where, in 1994, members of the community symbolically scrubbed the steps following a Klan rally.

On July 28, 2024, one week after the white supremacist march, at an anti-white supremacist counterprotest in downtown Howell, residents cleansed the sidewalk to symbolically wash away the racism.

On August 20, 2024, presidential candidate, Donald Trump, visited Howell for a law-and-order themed campaign speech at the Livingston County Sheriff's Office. On July 14, 2025, hundreds of Howell residents congregated in front of the city hall on Grand River Ave. in participation in the No Kings protests. On October 18, 2025, over 2,200 protestors participated at the same location for the second round of "No kings day."

On January 26, 2026, the Howell City Council appointed Kristi Troy as its city manager, the first woman to hold the role in its history.

== Geography ==
According to the United States Census Bureau, the city has an area of 4.95 square miles (12.82 km^{2}), of which 4.75 square miles (12.30 km^{2}) is land and 0.20 square miles (0.52 km^{2}) is water.

=== Climate ===
This climatic region is typified by large seasonal temperature differences, with warm to hot (and often humid) summers and cold (sometimes severely cold) winters. According to the Köppen Climate Classification system, Howell has a humid continental climate, abbreviated "Dfb" on climate maps.

=== Major highways ===
- I-96
- BL I-96
- M-59
- M-155 (unsigned)
- D-19

== Demographics ==
Historical population
| Census | Pop. | Note | %± |
|---|---|---|---|
| 1850 | 473 | | — |
| 1860 | 754 | | 59.4% |
| 1880 | 2,071 | | — |
| 1890 | 2,387 | | 15.3% |
| 1900 | 2,518 | | 5.5% |
| 1910 | 2,338 | | −7.1% |
| 1920 | 2,951 | | 26.2% |
| 1930 | 3,615 | | 22.5% |
| 1940 | 3,748 | | 3.7% |
| 1950 | 4,353 | | 16.1% |
| 1960 | 4,861 | | 11.7% |
| 1970 | 5,224 | | 7.5% |
| 1980 | 6,976 | | 33.5% |
| 1990 | 8,184 | | 17.3% |
| 2000 | 9,232 | | 12.8% |
| 2010 | 9,489 | | 2.8% |
| 2020 | 10,068 | | 6.1% |
U.S. Decennial Census

=== 2020 census ===
As of the 2020 census, Howell had a population of 10,068. The median age was 38.1 years. 18.9% of residents were under the age of 18 and 17.2% of residents were 65 years of age or older. For every 100 females there were 97.1 males, and for every 100 females age 18 and over there were 92.9 males age 18 and over.

100.0% of residents lived in urban areas, while 0.0% lived in rural areas.

There were 4,481 households in Howell, of which 24.9% had children under the age of 18 living in them. Of all households, 34.5% were married-couple households, 21.7% were households with a male householder and no spouse or partner present, and 33.4% were households with a female householder and no spouse or partner present. About 37.8% of all households were made up of individuals and 14.7% had someone living alone who was 65 years of age or older.

There were 4,760 housing units, of which 5.9% were vacant. The homeowner vacancy rate was 1.6% and the rental vacancy rate was 5.4%.

Racial composition as of the 2020 census
| Race | Number | Percentage |
|---|---|---|
| White | 9,000 | 89.4% |
| Black or African American | 121 | 1.2% |
| American Indian and Alaska Native | 41 | 0.4% |
| Asian | 115 | 1.1% |
| Native Hawaiian and Other Pacific Islander | 45 | 0.4% |
| Some other race | 150 | 1.5% |
| Two or more races | 596 | 5.9% |
| Hispanic or Latino (of any race) | 445 | 4.4% |

=== 2010 census ===
As of the census of 2010, the city had 9,489 people, 4,028 households, and 2,237 families. The population density was 1,997.7 inhabitants per square mile (771.3/km^{2}). There were 4,551 housing units at an average density of 958.1 per square mile (369.9/km^{2}). The city's racial makeup was 94.8% White, 0.4% African American, 0.7% Native American, 1.1% Asian, 0.3% Pacific Islander, 1.3% from other races, and 1.3% from two or more races. Hispanic or Latino people of any race were 3.5% of the population.

There were 4,028 households, of which 30.4% had children under the age of 18 living with them, 36.8% were married couples living together, 13.6% had a female householder with no husband present, 5.1% had a male householder with no wife present, and 44.5% were non-families. 36.6% of all households were made up of individuals, and 12% had someone living alone who was 65 years of age or older. The average household size was 2.25 and the average family size was 2.97.

The median age in the city was 35.2 years. 23.2% of the city's population was under age 18; 10.1% was between the age 18 and 24; 29.8% was from age 25 to 44; 23.6% was from age 45 to 64; and 13.5% was age 65 or older. The city's gender makeup was 48.2% male and 51.8% female.

=== 2000 census ===
As of the census of 2000, the city had 9,232 people, 3,857 households, and 2,247 families. The population density was 2,245.8 inhabitants per square mile (867.1/km^{2}). The city's racial makeup was 96.0% White, 0.3% African American, 0.6% Native American, 1.2% Asian, 0.2% Pacific Islander, 7.2% from other races, and 7.9% from two or more races. Hispanic or Latino people of any race were 2.2% of the population.

The city's median household income was $43,958 and the median family income was $57,149. Males had a median income of $44,980 versus $27,956 for females. The city's per capita income was $22,254. About 4.6% of families and 6.6% of the population were below the poverty line, including 7.2% of those under the age of 18 and 7.9% of those 65 and older.

=== 2022 estimates ===
As of 2022, 87% of Howell's population were white, 1.7% African American, 0.7% Native American, 0.6% Asian, 1.6% from other races, and 2.3% from two or more races. Hispanic or Latino people of any race were 3.8% of the population.

== Economy ==
As of 2022, the economy of Howell, MI employed 5410 people. The largest industries were manufacturing (969 people), health care & social assistance (786 people), and accommodation & food services (726 people); the highest paying industries were transportation & warehousing ($240,235), information ($100,398), and transportation & warehousing, & utilities ($79,417).

== Government ==
Since 2025, Nikolas Hertrich has been Mayor.

== Education ==
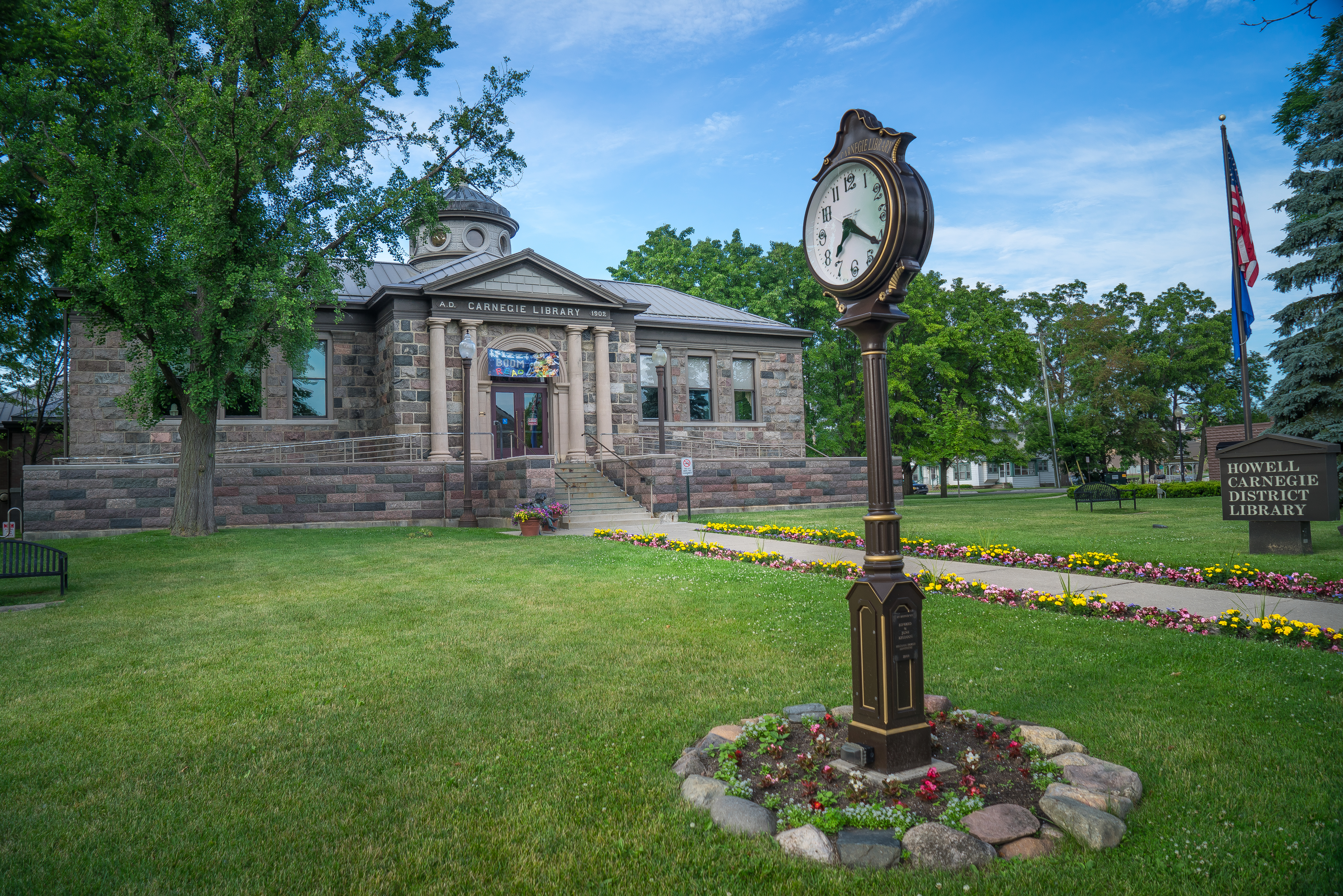
Carnegie District Library

Higher education institutions

- Cleary University (Cougars)
- Lansing Community College

High schools

- Howell High School (grades 10-12) (Highlanders)
- Howell High School Freshman Campus (grade 9) (Highlanders)
- Kensington Woods High School (Bears)

Middle schools

- Highlander Way Middle School (Hawks)
- Parker Middle School (Patriots)

Elementary schools

- Challenger Elementary School (champions)
- Hutchings Elementary School (Huskies)
- Northwest Elementary School (Eagles)
- Southeast Elementary School (Super Stars) (closed 2017)
- Southwest Elementary School (Coyotes)
- St. Joseph Catholic Elementary School
- Three Fires Elementary School (Timberwolves)
- Voyager Elementary School (Vikings)

Other schools

- Innovation Academy (Ravens)

Libraries

- The Carnegie District Library

== Notable people ==
- Heywood Banks, musician, poet, comedian, cult icon, and multilingual Toast chef/connoisseur
- Bones, rapper and singer
- Donald Burgett, World War II veteran and author
- Timothy Busfield, actor and director
- Melissa Gilbert, actress and author
- T.J. Hensick, former hockey player who last played in the ECHL
- Andy Hilbert, hockey player who last played for Minnesota Wild
- William Mather Lewis, president of George Washington University, mayor of Lake Forest, Illinois
- Yuki Nomura, baseball player for the Hokkaido Nippon-Ham Fighters
- Mike Rogers, United States Congressman
- Mark Schauer, former United States Congressman and Michigan gubernatorial candidate in 2014
- Bert Tooley, shortstop for the Brooklyn Dodgers, 1911–1912
- Steve Lombardi, former WWE professional wrestler
