= Howell High School (Howell, Michigan) =

Location
- 1200 West Grand River Avenue; Howell, Michigan 48843; United States; 42°36′53″N 83°57′05″W

Information
- Type: Public high school
- School district: Howell Public School District
- Superintendent: Erin J. MacGregor
- Principal: Jason Schrock
- Teaching staff: 92.83 (on an FTE basis)
- Grades: 9-12
- Enrollment: 1,964 (2024-2025)
- Student to teacher ratio: 21.16
- Campus type: Suburb
- Colors: Highlander Green; Highlander Gold
- Athletics: MHSAA Class A
- Athletics conference: Kensington Lakes Activities Association
- Nickname: Highlanders
- Rivals: Brighton High School Hartland High School
- Newspaper: The Main Four
- Yearbook: The Torch
- Website: howellhighschool.ss12.sharpschool.com

Howell High School (HHS) is a public high school in Howell, Michigan, United States. In the 2023-2024 school year, the school served 1,919 students grades 9-12 for the Howell Public School District.

== Building ==
Howell High School was designed by Richard Prince and Associates. The building cost $23 million ($84 million in 2025 dollars) and was dedicated on January 17, 1982.

== Academics ==
According to the 2024 U.S. News & World Report assessment, 17% of students passed at least one AP exam. The graduation rate is 90%.

AP Classes offered at HHS include: AP Calculus AB, AP Calculus BC, AP Statistics, AP Computer Science, AP Computer Science Principles, AP Art and Design, AP English Language and Composition, AP English Literature, AP Environmental Science, AP Biology, AP Chemistry, AP Physics 1, AP Physics C: Mechanics, AP United States History, AP Economics, AP Psychology, AP Comparative Government, AP Spanish Language and Culture, and AP United States Government.

== Athletics ==
Howell High School's Highlanders compete in the Kensington Lakes Activity Association. School colors are green and Vegas gold. The following Michigan High School Athletic Association (MHSAA) sanctioned sports are offered:

- Baseball (boys)
- Basketball (girls and boys)
- Bowling (girls and boys)
- Competitive cheerleading (girls)
- Cross country (girls and boys)
  - Boys state champion - 1959, 1960
- Football (boys)
- Golf (girls and boys)
- Gymnastics (girls)
- Ice hockey (boys)
- Lacrosse (girls and boys)
- Pompon (girls)
- Skiing (girls and boys)
- Soccer (girls and boys)
- Softball (girls)
- Swim and dive (girls and boys)
- Tennis (girls and boys)
- Track and field (girls and boys)
- Volleyball (girls)
- Wrestling (girls and boys)

George Jewett, the first African American football player at the University of Michigan, and the first African American to play in the Big Ten Conference, was Howell High School's first football coach, and the first African American coach of a Michigan High School. Under Jewett's leadership, the Howell Highlanders football team went undefeated during the 1896 season.

== Notable alumni ==
- Mark Schauer - United States House of Representatives, Michigan's 7th congressional district 2009-2011, Democratic candidate in 2014 gubernatorial election.
- Elmo Kennedy O'Connor - rapper
- Mike Rogers - former Republican US Representative for Michigan's 8th congressional district 2001-2015
- Shirley Weis - Mayo Clinic Chief Administrative Officer 2007-2013
