= Handy Township, Michigan =

- Civil township
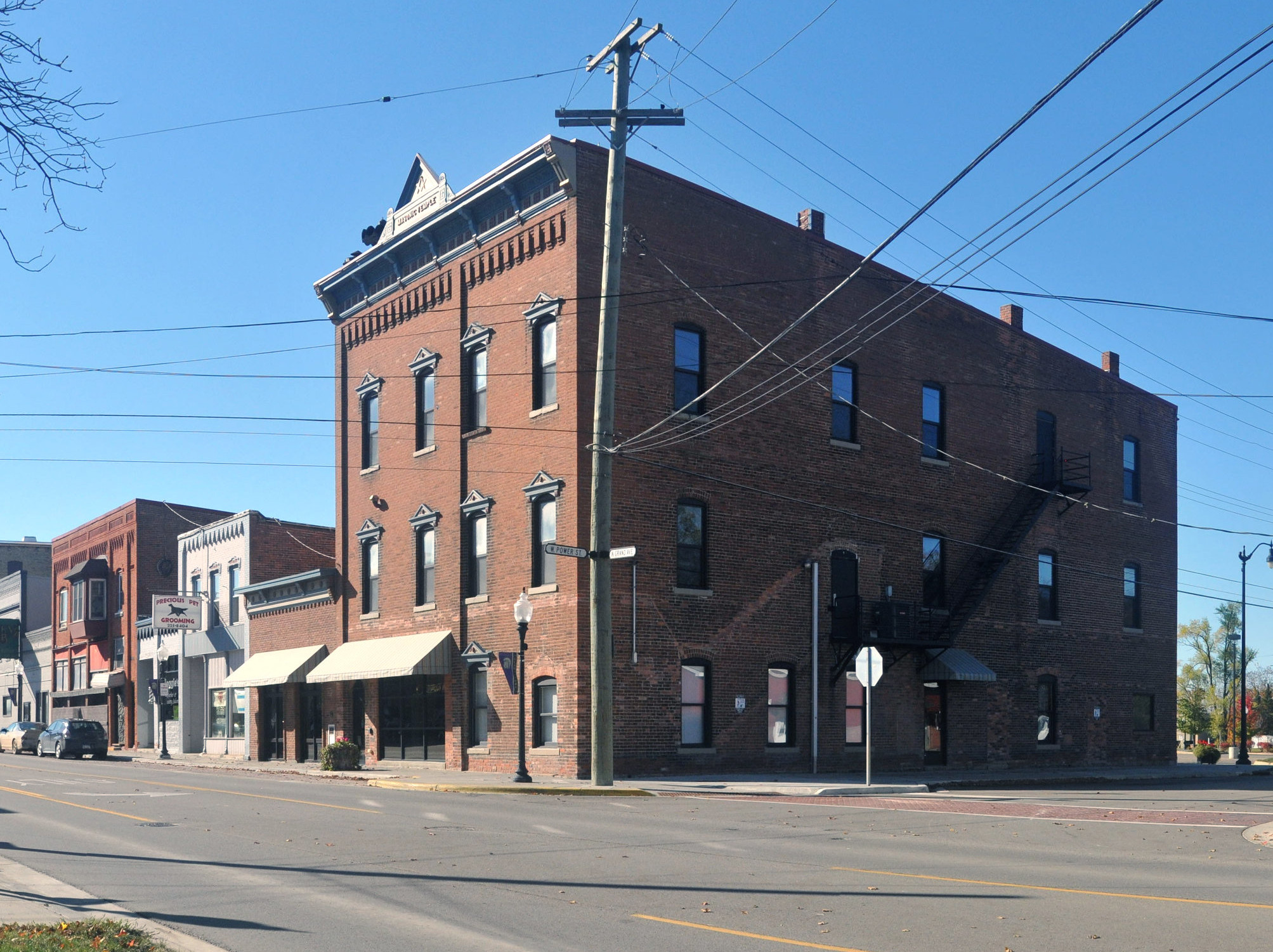
- Handy Township Hall in Fowlerville

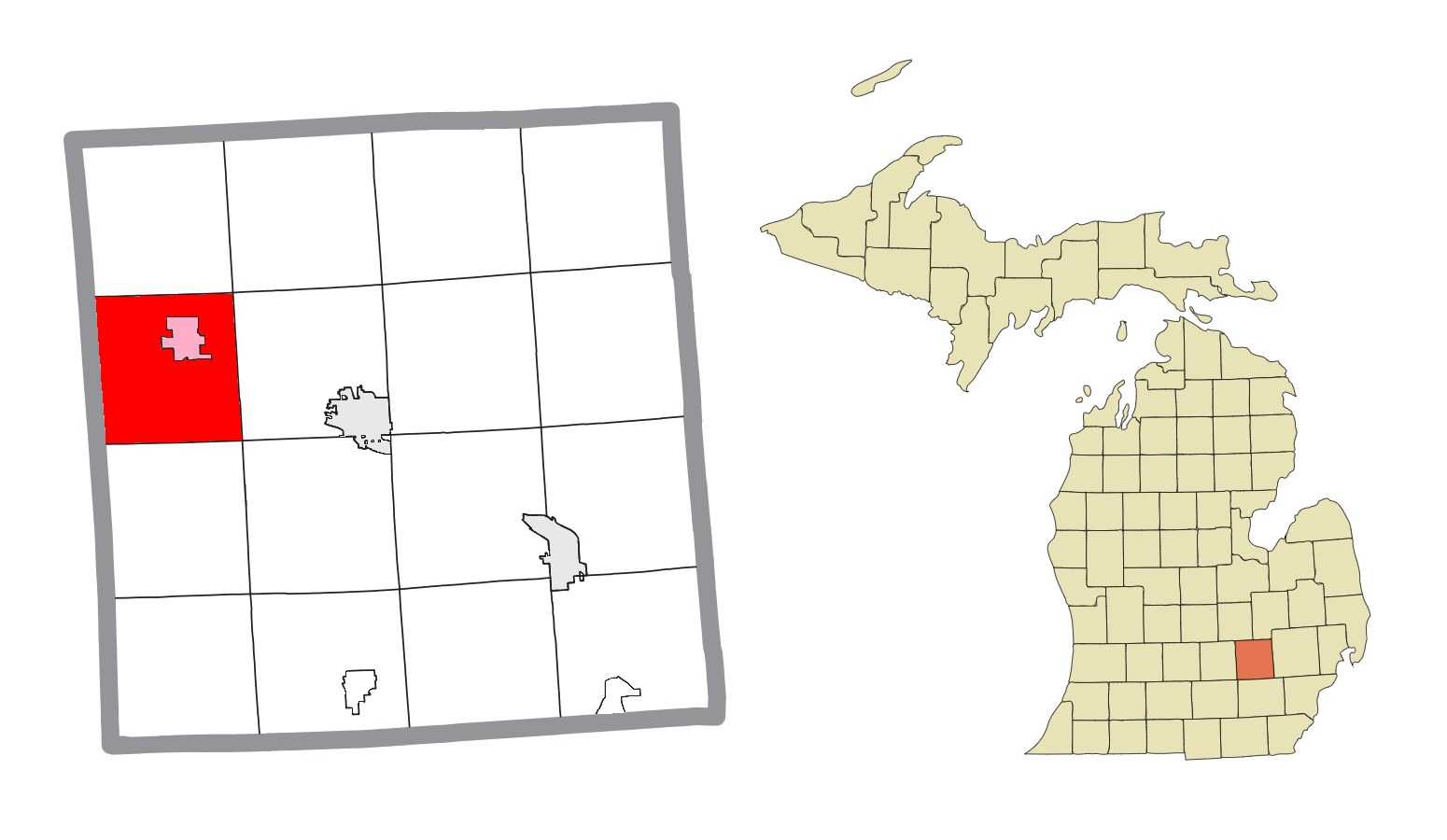
- Location within Livingston County (red) and the administered village of Fowlerville (pink)

- Location in Michigan Location in the United States
- Coordinates: 42°39′06″N 84°05′17″W
- Country: United States
- State: Michigan
- County: Livingston
- Organized: 1838

Government
  - Supervisor: Ed Alverson
  - Clerk: Laura Eisele

Area
  - Total: 34.51 sq mi (89.37 km^{2})
  - Land: 34.34 sq mi (88.95 km^{2})
  - Water: 0.16 sq mi (0.42 km^{2})
- Elevation: 906 ft (276 m)

Population (2020)
  - Total: 8,602
  - Density: 250.5/sq mi (96.71/km^{2})
- Time zone: UTC-5 (Eastern (EST))
  - Summer (DST): UTC-4 (EDT)
- ZIP code(s): 48836 (Fowlerville); 48892 (Webberville)
- Area code: 517
- FIPS code: 26-36340
- GNIS feature ID: 1626430
- Website: www.handytownship.org

Handy Township is a civil township of Livingston County in the U.S. state of Michigan. The population was 8,602 at the time of the 2020 census, up from 8,006 at the 2000 census. The village of Fowlerville is located within the township.

== Geography ==
Handy Township is on the west side of Livingston County and is bordered to the west by Ingham County. Interstate 96 passes through the township, with access from Exit 129 (Grand Avenue), serving Fowlerville. I-96 leads west 28 miles (45 km) to Lansing and southeast 62 miles (100 km) to Detroit.

According to the United States Census Bureau, the township has a total area of 34.5 square miles (89.4 km^{2}), of which 34.3 square miles (88.9 km^{2}) are land and 0.2 square miles (0.4 km^{2}), or 0.48%, are water. The township is drained by the Red Cedar River and its tributaries, part of the Grand River watershed leading to Lake Michigan.

== Demographics ==
As of the census of 2000, there were 7,004 people, 2,504 households, and 1,837 families residing in the township. The population density was 203.0 inhabitants per square mile (78.4/km^{2}). There were 2,594 housing units at an average density of 75.2 per square mile (29.0/km^{2}). The racial makeup of the township was 97.04% White, 0.19% African American, 0.97% Native American, 0.34% Asian, 0.01% Pacific Islander, 0.26% from other races, and 1.19% from two or more races. Hispanic or Latino of any race were 1.07% of the population.

There were 2,504 households, out of which 40.6% had children under the age of 18 living with them, 56.5% were married couples living together, 11.8% had a female householder with no husband present, and 26.6% were non-families. 21.0% of all households were made up of individuals, and 8.4% had someone living alone who was 65 years of age or older. The average household size was 2.78 and the average family size was 3.22.

In the township the population was spread out, with 30.9% under the age of 18, 7.3% from 18 to 24, 33.0% from 25 to 44, 18.9% from 45 to 64, and 9.9% who were 65 years of age or older. The median age was 33 years. For every 100 females, there were 97.5 males. For every 100 females age 18 and over, there were 94.1 males.

The median income for a household in the township was $49,447, and the median income for a family was $55,386. Males had a median income of $44,700 versus $29,696 for females. The per capita income for the township was $20,159. About 4.0% of families and 6.2% of the population were below the poverty line, including 6.1% of those under age 18 and 8.4% of those age 65 or over.

== Notable people ==
- Cindy Denby, member of the Michigan House of Representatives
- Charlie Gehringer, baseball player and official
